= Ryan Eversley =

American race car driver

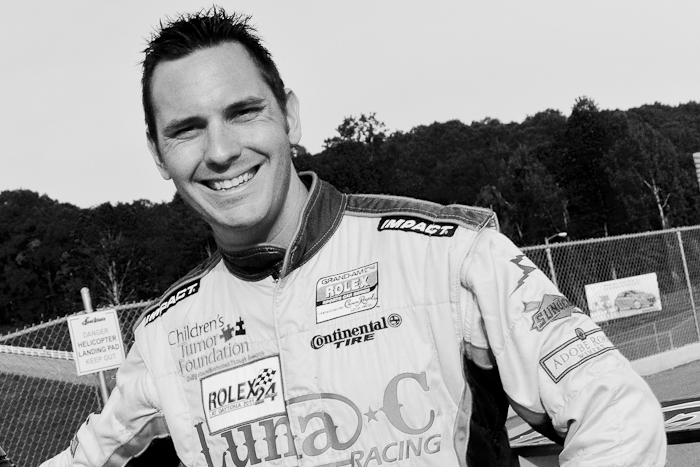
- Eversley in 2011
- Nationality: (United States) American
- Born: Ryan A. Eversley; December 22, 1983 (age 42) Lithonia, Georgia, U.S.

Michelin Pilot Challenge career
- Debut season: 2019
- Current team: L.A. Honda World Racing
- Categorisation: FIA Gold
- Car number: 37

NASCAR Cup Series career
- 1 race run over 1 year
- 2021 position: 41st
- Best finish: 41st (2021)
- First race: 2021 Jockey Made in America 250 (Road America)
Wins	Top tens	Poles
0	0	0

NASCAR O'Reilly Auto Parts Series career
- 2021 position: 112th
- Best finish: 112th (2021)

Pirelli World Challenge career
- Debut season: 2010
- Current team: Gradient Racing Acura
- Car number: 5
- Best finish: 1st in 2018

Previous series
- 2019 2014–2016 2010 2007–2013 2004, 2010: Stadium Super Trucks; IMSA SportsCar Championship; SCCA Pro Racing World Challenge; Rolex Sports Car Series; American Le Mans Series

Championship titles
- 2018: Pirelli World Challenge TCR
- Statistics up to date as of December 25, 2021.

Ryan A. Eversley (born December 22, 1983) is an American professional auto racing driver. He currently races the No. 7 Audi RS 3 LMS for Precision Racing L.A. in the IMSA Michelin Pilot Challenge series as well as serving as Head of Driver and Racing Business Development for them and their sister team L.A. Honda World Racing. He is affectionately referred to as "The People's Champ," due to his fan interactions. From 2015 to 2023, Eversley was a Honda factory driver who primarily raced in sports car racing championships such as the Michelin Pilot Challenge and Pirelli World Challenge. He won the 2018 Pirelli World Challenge TCR championship.

== Early career ==
Though his parents could not fund his racing career, they were supportive and helped Eversley to find opportunities. He left public school and pursued his high school degree in a homeschooling program so he could pursue a driving career.

Eversley got a job from Mike Johnson in 2001 with the Archangel Racing Team as a mechanic, allowing him to leave his full-time job at the local mill. He vowed that his entrance into motor sports would allow him to never need to return to the mill.

"I was one of the first guys in the shop every day and I was the one they had to tell to go home because I was so excited to be working on prototypes at sixteen and seventeen years old," Eversley stated in an interview on the Marshall Pruett Podcast in 2016. His first race as a mechanic was with the Archangel team the Rolex 24 Hours of Daytona in 2001.

Using the money he made working, Eversley went to the Panoz Racing Schools at Road Atlanta and raced go-karts whenever possible to gain experience. A driver himself, Mike Johnson was able to help Eversley get seat time and eventually a ride in the Continental Tire Series.

=== First race ===
Eversley's first race took place in Sonoma in the Spring of 2003 in a Star Mazda. In his own words: “I rented a ride from a kid I met on Auto Racing AOL chatroom. This kid, Chris Nelson, him and his dad Bob Nelson help me out”. The Nelsons had the car, but didn't have enough money to race it. Eversley continues: “They said come to Sonoma. As long as you don’t crash you’re fine. It was kind of nerve wracking, because I don’t have two pennies to rub together… We go. I finish dead last, I sucked and I was so happy.”

== Racing career ==
=== 2003 ===
Debuted in ST I class. He finished sixteenth in only one race at Virginia International Raceway.

=== 2004 ===
In 2004, James Cook offered Eversley a ride in three IMSA races if he would build the car for him. Eversley accepted and created a team with Crew Chief Jason Duncan. They built the B2K/40 Lola with a Millington turbo engine and raced it at Mid-Ohio, Lime Rock and Road Atlanta in the LMP2 class. Though the class was small, the car finished second in each race.

Finished fifth in lone ST race at Homestead-Miami Speedway.

=== 2006 ===
Did not score any points after driving in four races.

=== 2007 ===
Finished 83rd in GS points. ... Three races, best finish fifteenth at Daytona International Speedway.

=== 2008 ===
Finished 26th in GS points. ... Seven races, best finish ninth at New Jersey Motorsports Park.

=== 2009 ===
Eversley competed in the 24 Hours of Daytona in the GT class for Stevenson Motorsports. The team finished 22nd overall and thirteenth in class.

=== 2010 ===
Eversley competed in the SCCA Pro Racing World Challenge race at the Mid-Ohio Sports Car Course and won both rounds of the TC class in his series debut. He made another Rolex Sports Car Series start in 2010 for Matt Connolly Motorsports at Barber Motorsports Park. The team failed to finish the race. He also drove in the American Le Mans Series' Petit Le Mans for Magnus Racing in the GTC class and finished third in class. Finished 84th in GS points. Four races, best finish tenth at Virginia International Raceway. Eversley drives in the Continental Tire Sports Car Challenge for Compass360 Racing in the ST class. He captured a class victory in the race at Virginia International Raceway. He also competed in the 2011 24 Hours of Daytona for The Racer's Group in the Children's Tumor Foundation charity Porsche. The team finished twentieth overall and eighth in class.

=== 2015 ===
2015 was his first year competing full-time in the Pirelli World Challenge series in the GT class. In the first Pirelli World Challenge race of 2015, the Nissan Grand Prix of Texas at the Circuit of the Americas in Austin, TX, Eversley, in the No. 43 RealTime/Acura Motorsports/HPD Acura TLX-GT, rocketed up to finish fifth after starting 25th on the day. Eversley was awarded the Optima Batteries Best Start Award for gaining eight positions, and the VP Racing Fuels Hard Charger Award for gaining twenty positions in the race.

Driving an Acura TLX for RealTime Racing, Eversley recorded a win at St. Petersburg, ultimately finishing sixth in the GT standings.

=== 2016 ===
Eversley returned to World Challenge racing with RealTime in 2016, again driving the TLX. He recorded back-to-back wins at Road America, finishing sixth in the GT standings for the second year in a row with four podiums.

=== 2017 ===
RealTime Racing returned to the World Challenge in 2017 with a new program in the Acura NSX GT3. They scored one podium with a second place finish at Utah, but Eversley reported in the Mario Andretti episode of his Dinner With Racers podcast that the team was struggling with downforce in their first year in development with the new car.

=== 2018 ===
In December 2017, Eversley announced that he would be joining Honda of America Racing Team (HART) in 2018 to drive an Acura NSX GT3 with co-driver Chad Gilsinger in Tequila Patron North American Endurance Cup races.

In the inaugural season of the Pirelli World Challenge TCR class, Eversley won five races to clinch the championship.

=== 2019 ===
A few weeks prior to the opening weekend of the Blancpain GT Series of America, Eversley announced his commitment to the Gradient Racing team, running an Acura NSX GT3 Evo. Eversley continued his IMSA career with co-driver Chad Gilsinger in HART's Honda Civic Type R TCR under the Michelin Pilot Challenge.

In July, Eversley made his Stadium Super Trucks debut at Honda Indy Toronto, driving the No. 43 Continental Tire truck. The following month, he competed in the series' second Mid-Ohio Sports Car Course weekend. In the Friday round, he was involved in a wreck with Jeff Hoffman on the first lap that sent his truck into a flip before landing on its wheels; although he finished fourth, he was promoted to third when Cole Potts received a one-position penalty for cutting the course.

=== 2020 ===
Eversley joined the LA Honda World team in the Michelin Pilot Challenge for 2020.

=== 2021 ===
In January 2021, Atlanta Speedwerks announced that Eversley would co-drive the No. 94 Honda Civic TCR with Greg Strelzoff. Eversley and Strelzoff were joined by ATL Speedworks owner Todd Lamb at Daytona and opened the season with a second-place finish. Strelzoff would be replaced by Scott Smithson for Mid-Ohio and the pair would finish third. Lamb would return to join Eversley for the four-hour race at Watkins Glen and the pair would win as the team took the championship points lead. A second-place finish with Smithson as part of an Atlanta Speedworks 1-2 finish in the Sahlen's 120 at the Glen a week later was taken away after the car was moved to the back of the field for not meeting minimum weight. Smithson would remain with him for three more races. Eversley's team would skip the race at VIR, but he would join the sister Atlanta Speedwerks No. 84 Honda entry with Brian Henderson. In the season finale at Road Atlanta, Eversley returned to the No. 94 Honda and would be joined by Tyler Stone and the team scored another second-place finish.

In June, Eversley announced he would make his NASCAR Cup Series debut at Road America in the No. 53 for Rick Ware Racing. After the second-place finish in the Michelin Pilot Challenge race at Watkins Glen, Eversley flew to Road America in time to practice and qualify. He would start 31st, but a rear gear issue ended his day after just 27 laps and he finished 39th.

In August, Eversley would attempt his second NASCAR race, this time with JD Motorsports in the NASCAR Xfinity Series at the Indianapolis road course. He would be one of eight drivers to fail to qualify for the race.

=== 2022 ===
In February 2022, it was announced that Eversley would be co-driving with Aidan Read in the No. 51 Nurtec ODT Acura NSX GT3 Evo for Rick Ware Racing for the IMSA WeatherTech Sprint Cup Championship. The team was set to finish in fourth-place on debut at Long Beach until they were pushed into a tire barrier by a prototype. The team would score their only podium finish of the season at Canadian Tire Motorsports Park. Eversley and Read finished eighth in the Sprint Cup Championship. Rick Ware Racing would move the program to the LMP2 class for 2023 and Eversley would not return.

Eversley also competed in a part-time schedule in the IMSA Michelin Pilot Challenge, returning to L.A. Honda World Racing after a year away, driving the No. 73 Honda Civic Type R TCR. He teamed up with Mike LaMarra for the races at Daytona, Sebring, and Watkins Glen, and was joined by Mat Pombo at the season finale at Road Atlanta. Pombo would win the pole at Road Atlanta and they were in contention for the win late in the race before finishing fourth. Eversley also joined HART's No. 89 Honda Civic Type R TCR driving lineup at Road America.

=== 2023 ===
In December 2022, L.A. Honda World Racing announced that Eversley would drive the No. 37 Honda Civic Type R TCR with Mat Pombo and that they would be the first team to take delivery of the new Honda Civic FL5 Type Rs. Pombo would win the team four straight pole positions to open the season at Daytona, Sebring, Laguna Seca, and Watkins Glen, giving him five straight poles dating back to the 2022 season finale. The team would score their first podium of the season with a third-place finish at Laguna Seca. They would score their second podium at Lime Rock after dominating the race on pace from the pole, but the car struggled with tire degradation over the full run and would fall behind two Hyundais to finish third. After Lime Rock, the team made the decision to shuffle the driver lineups to "switch up the mojo" after some struggles and Eversley would once again pair with LaMarra who had been driving the sister No. 73 Honda beginning at Road America. Eversley and LaMarra would finish the season with a third-place podium finish at Road Atlanta with Eversley finishing 12th in the TCR driver's championship.

=== 2024 ===
In January 2024, it was announced that Eversley had joined Precision Racing L.A. to serve as Head of Driver and Racing Business Development for them and their sister team L.A. Honda World Racing. He will also race the full Pirelli GT4 America Series for Precision Racing L.A. in a Toyota GT4 Supra. He would share the car with a rotating cast of drivers, scoring a podium at Circuit of the Americas with Mike La Marra as well as a win and a podium in the season finale doubleheader at Indianapolis with Terry Borcheller.

=== 2025 ===
At the end of December 2024, Precision Racing LA announced that Eversley would join IMSA Diverse Driver Scholarship winner Celso Neto in the No. 7 Audi TCR in the IMSA Michelin Pilot Challenge. The pair opened the season with a podium finish at Daytona and added another at Canadian Tire Motorsports Park.

== Children's Tumor Foundation charity work ==
After driving the Children's Tumor Foundation (CTF) charity car in the 2011 24 Hours of Daytona, Eversley has been committed to raising money and awareness to battle neurofibromatosis, a condition that causes tumors to form in the brain, spinal cord, and nerves. Over the last few years Eversley has raised tens of thousands of dollars for CTF, largely through an annual event called the Cupid's Undie Run, which he and other team members run in their underwear every February.

== Dinner with Racers podcast ==
Eversley co-hosts the racing podcast Dinner with Racers with former sports car PR person Sean Heckman. They begrudgingly travel across the United States to interview hesitant racing drivers, team owners, engineers and general motorsports personalities over meals. The show has had more than one season and some guests from various motorsports series, mostly focused on American racing series like NASCAR, IndyCar and the WeatherTech SportsCar Championship.

== Personal life ==
Eversley is the son of veteran sports car racing mechanic John Eversley. He currently resides in Atlanta, Georgia.

== Motorsports career results ==
(key)

=== Pirelli World Challenge results ===
Year	Team	Make	Engine	Class	1	2	3	4	5	6	7	8	9	10	11	12	13	14	15	16	17	18	19	20	Rank	Points
2010		Mazda	RX-8	TC	STP1	STP2	LBH	MOS1	MOS2	WAT	TOR	MOH1; 1	MOH2; 1	VIR1	VIR2	MIL									15th	249
2014	C360R	Subaru	Impreza WRX STI	GTS	STP	LBH	BAR1; 12	BAR2; 8	DET1	DET2	ELK1	ELK2	TOR1	TOR2	MOH1	MOH2	SON1	SON2	MIL1	MIL1					28th	122
2015	RealTime Racing	Acura	TLX-GT	GT	COA1; 34	COA2; 5	STP1; **1**	STP2; 7	LBH; 6	BAR1; 14	BAR2; 12	MOS1; 15	MOS2; 10	DET; 9	ELK1; 9	ELK2; 10	ELK3; 23	MOH1; 11	MOH2; 12	MIL1; 11	MIL2; 9	SON1; 10	SON2; 17	LAG; 10	6th	1198
2016	RealTime Racing	Acura	TLX-GT	GT	COA1; 10	COA2; 12	STP1; 10	STP2; 6	LBH; 7	BAR1; 20	BAR2; 12	MOS1; 3	MOS2; 18	LRP1; 6	LRP2; 4	ELK1; 1	ELK2; **1**	MOH1; 5	MOH2; 2	UTA1; 4	UTA2; 17	SON1; 10	SON2; 12	LAG; 10	6th	1365
2017	RealTime Racing	Acura	NSX GT3	GT	STP1; DNF	STP2; 8	LBH; 11	VIR1; 19	VIR2; 11	MOS1; 11	LRP1; 5	LRP2; 5	ELK1; 10	ELK2; 8	MOH1; 10	MOH2; 8	UTA1; 5	UTA2; 2	COA1; 9	COA2; 9	COA3; 6	SON1; DNF	SON2; DNF		8th	206
2018	RealTime Racing	Honda	Civic Type R TCR (FK8)	TCR	STP1; NH	STP2; NH	COA1; 3	COA2; 3	LBH; NH	VIR1; 1	VIR2; 2	MOS1; NH	MOS2; NH	LRP1; 1	LRP2; 4	ELK1; NH	ELK2; NH	POR1; 3	POR2; 1	UTA1; 3	UTA2; 3	WGI1; 1	WGI2; 1		**1st**	**276**

=== Pirelli GT4 America Championship ===
Year	Team	Car	Class	1	2	3	4	5	6	7	8	9	10	11	12	13	14	Rank	Points
2021	ST Racing	BMW M4 GT4	Pro-Am	SON1; 13	SON2; 13	COA1; 17	COA2; 6	VIR1	VIR2	ELK1	ELK2	WGL1	WGL2	SEB1	SEB2	IMS1	IMS2	20th	8
2024	Precision Racing LA	Toyota GR Supra GT4 Evo	Pro-Am	SON1; 10	SON2; 6	SEB1	SEB2	COA; 3	VIR1; 12	VIR2; 6	ELK1; 10	ELK2; 11	BAR1	BAR1	IMS1; 1	IMS2; 3		11th	85
2026	Precision Racing LA	Toyota GR Supra GT4 Evo	Pro-Am	SON1; 5	SON2; 5	COA; 6	SEB1; 10	SEB2; 6	ATL1; 14	ATL2; 5	ELK1	ELK2	BAR1	BAR2	IMS1	IMS2		9th*	51*

* Season is still in progress.

=== Michelin Pilot Challenge results ===
Year	Team	Car	Class	1	2	3	4	5	6	7	8	9	10	11	12	Rank	Points
2008	Motorsport Technology Group	Porsche 997	GS	DAY	LRP	MOS	MOH	WAT	BAR	IA	CTR	NJ	MIL	VIR		26th	111
2009	Kinetic Motorsports	BMW M3	GS	DAY	MIA	NJ; 16	LAG	LRP; 13	WAT	MOH; 11	BAR	CTR	MIL	VIR; 10		44th	33
2010	Compass360 Racing	Honda Civic Si	ST	DAY; 5	MIA; 30	BAR; 3	VIR; 1	LRP; 3	WAT; 2	MOH; 3	NJ; 4	CTR	MIL; 4			4th	239
2010	BGB Motorsports	Porsche Carrera	GS	DAY	MIA	BAR	VIR	LRP	WAT	MOH	NJ	CTR	MIL; 16			80th	15
2011	Compass360 Racing	Honda Civic Si	ST	DAY; 11	MIA; 5	BAR; 22	VIR; 1	LRP; 3	WAT; 5	ELK; 16	LAG; 6	NJ; 9	MOH; 10			2nd	229
2012	Compass360 Racing	Honda Civic Si	ST	DAY; 12	BAR; 7	MIA; 5	NJ; 30	MOH; 7	ELK; 6	WAT; 29	IMS; 29	LAG; 4	LRP; 18			11th	164
2013	Compass360 Racing	Honda Civic Si	ST	DAY; 3	COA; 6	BAR; 13	ATL; 11	MOH; 3	WAT; 2	IMS; 19	ELK; 16	KAN; 3	LAG; 9	LRP		2nd	259
2014	Compass360 Racing	Honda Civic Si	ST	DAY; DNF	SEB; 17	LAG; 7	LRP; 2	KAN; 4	WAT; 1	MOS; 4	IMS; 21	ELK; 19	VIR	COA; 1	ATL; 1	9th	234
2016	HART	Honda Civic Si	ST	DAY	SEB	LAG	WAT; 21	MOS; 3	LRP; 26	ELK; 2	VIR; 1	COA	ATL			20th	139
2019	HART	Honda Civic Type R TCR	TCR	DAY; 11	SEB; 3	MOH; 6	WGL; 12	MOS; 13	LIM; 5	ELK; 13	VIR	LGA; 7	ATL; 7			20th	204
2020	LA Honda World Racing	Honda Civic Type R TCR	TCR	DAY; 12	SEB1; 12	ELK; 10	VIR; 12	ATL1; 4	MOH1; 2	MOH2; 7	ATL2; 5	LGA; 4	SEB2; 5			13th	242
2021	Atlanta Speedwerks	Honda Civic Type R TCR	TCR	DAY; 2	SEB; 7	MOH; 3	WGL1; 1	WGL2; 15	LIM; 8	ELK; 9	LGA; 9	VIR; 7	ATL; 2			4th	2600
2022	LA Honda World Racing	Honda Civic Type R TCR	TCR	DAY; 11	SEB	LGA	MOH; 6	WGL; 13	MOS	LIM			ATL; 4			16th	1120
2022	HART	Honda Civic Type R TCR	TCR								ELK; 10	VIR				16th	1120
2023	LA Honda World Racing	Honda Civic Type R TCR	TCR	DAY; 9	SEB; 11	LGA; 3	WGL; 12	MOS; 10	LIM; 3	ELK; 5	VIR; 12	IMS	ATL; 3			12th	2170
2025	Precision Racing LA	Audi RS 3 LMS TCR	TCR	DAY; 3	SEB; 8	LGA; 8	MOH; 10	WGL; 7	MOS; 3	ELK; 7	VIR; 5	IMS; 2	ATL; 10			4th	2550

=== Grand-Am Rolex Sports Car Series ===
Rolex Sports Car Series
Year	Track	No.	Car	Team	Class	Start	Finish	Status
2007	Daytona	87	Porsche GT3	Farnbacher Loles Racing	GT	12	19	Running
2007	Lime Rock	24	BMW M3	Matt Connolly Motorsports	GT	3	4	Running
2009	Daytona	97	Chevrolet Corvette	Stevenson Motorsports	GT	22	12	Running
2010	Birmingham	19	Chevrolet Corvette	Matt Connolly Motorsports	GT	12	15	DNF
2011	Daytona	4	Porsche GT3	TRG	GT	6	8	Running
2011	Watkins Glen	67	Porsche GT3	TRG	GT	16	16	Running
2011	Laguna Seca	67	Porsche GT3	TRG	GT	16	11	Running
2012	Daytona	4	Porsche GT3	Magnus Racing	GT	17	36	Running
2012	Watkins Glen	67	Porsche GT3	Horton Autosport	GT	10	10	Running
2013	Daytona	38	Porsche Cayman	BGB Motorsports	GX	2	3	Running

=== American Le Mans Series ===
American Le Mans Series
Year	Track	No.	Car	Team	Class	Start	Finish	Status
2004	Mid-Ohio	13	Lola B2K/40	Marshall Cooke Racing	LMP2	4	2	Running
2004	Lime Rock	13	Lola B2K/40	Marshall Cooke Racing	LMP2	2	2	Running
2004	Road Atlanta	13	Lola B2K/40	Marshall Cooke Racing	LMP2	3	2	Running
2010	Road Atlanta	19	Porsche 911 GT3	Magnus Racing	GTC	3	3	Running

=== Complete WeatherTech SportsCar Championship results ===
(key) (Races in bold indicate pole position; results in italics indicate fastest lap)

Year	Team	Class	Make	Engine	1	2	3	4	5	6	7	8	9	10	11	12	Pos.	Points
2014	Bar1 Motorsports	PC	Oreca FLM09	Chevrolet LS3 6.2 L V8.	DAY	SEB	LGA; 10	KAN	WGL	IMS	ELK	VIR	COA				36th	27
2014	Starworks Motorsport	PC	Oreca FLM09	Chevrolet LS3 6.2 L V8.										PET; 5			36th	27
2016	Bar1 Motorsports	PC	Oreca FLM09	Chevrolet LS3 6.2 L V8	DAY; 5	SEB	LBH	LGA	DET	WGL	MOS	LIM	ELK	COA	PET		31st	1
2018	HART	GTD	Acura NSX GT3	Acura 3.5 L Turbo V6	DAY; 16	SEB; 15	MOH	BEL	WGL; 15	MOS	LIM	ELK	VIR	LGA	ATL		41st	47
2022	RWR Eurasia Motorsport	GTD	Acura NSX GT3 Evo22	Acura 3.5 L Turbo V6	DAY	SEB	LBH; 8	LGA; 8	MOH; 10	DET; 9	WGL	MOS; 3	LIM; 9	ELK; 9	VIR; 9	PET	15th	1427

=== Stadium Super Trucks ===
(key) (Bold – Pole position. Italics – Fastest qualifier. * – Most laps led.)

Stadium Super Trucks results
Year	1	2	3	4	5	6	7	8	9	10	11	12	13	14	15	16	17	18	19	SSTC	Pts	Ref
2019	COA	COA	TEX	TEX	LBH	LBH	TOR; 9	**TOR**; 8	MOH	MOH	MOH; 3	MOH; 6	ROA	ROA	ROA	POR	POR	SRF	SRF	11th	61	

=== NASCAR ===
(key) (Bold – Pole position awarded by qualifying time. Italics – Pole position earned by points standings or practice time. * – Most laps led.)

==== Cup Series ====
NASCAR Cup Series results
Year	Team	No.	Make	1	2	3	4	5	6	7	8	9	10	11	12	13	14	15	16	17	18	19	20	21	22	23	24	25	26	27	28	29	30	31	32	33	34	35	36	NCSC	Pts	Ref
2021	Rick Ware Racing	53	Ford	DAY	DAY	HOM	LVS	PHO	ATL	BRI	MAR	RCH	TAL	KAN	DAR	DOV	COA	CLT	SON	NSH	POC	POC	ROA; 39	ATL	NHA	GLN	IND	MCH	DAY	DAR	RCH	BRI	LVS	TAL	CLT	TEX	KAN	MAR	PHO	41st	1	

==== Xfinity Series ====
NASCAR Xfinity Series results
Year	Team	No.	Make	1	2	3	4	5	6	7	8	9	10	11	12	13	14	15	16	17	18	19	20	21	22	23	24	25	26	27	28	29	30	31	32	33	NXSC	Pts	Ref
2021	JD Motorsports	6	Chevy	DAY	DAY	HOM	LVS	PHO	ATL	MAR	TAL	DAR	DOV	COA	CLT	MOH	TEX	NSH	POC	ROA	ATL	NHA	GLN	IND; DNQ	MCH	DAY	DAR	RCH	BRI	LVS	TAL	CLT	TEX	KAN	MAR	PHO	112th	-	

^{*} Season still in progress
^{1} Ineligible for series points
