= Tom Long (racing driver) =

American sports racing driver

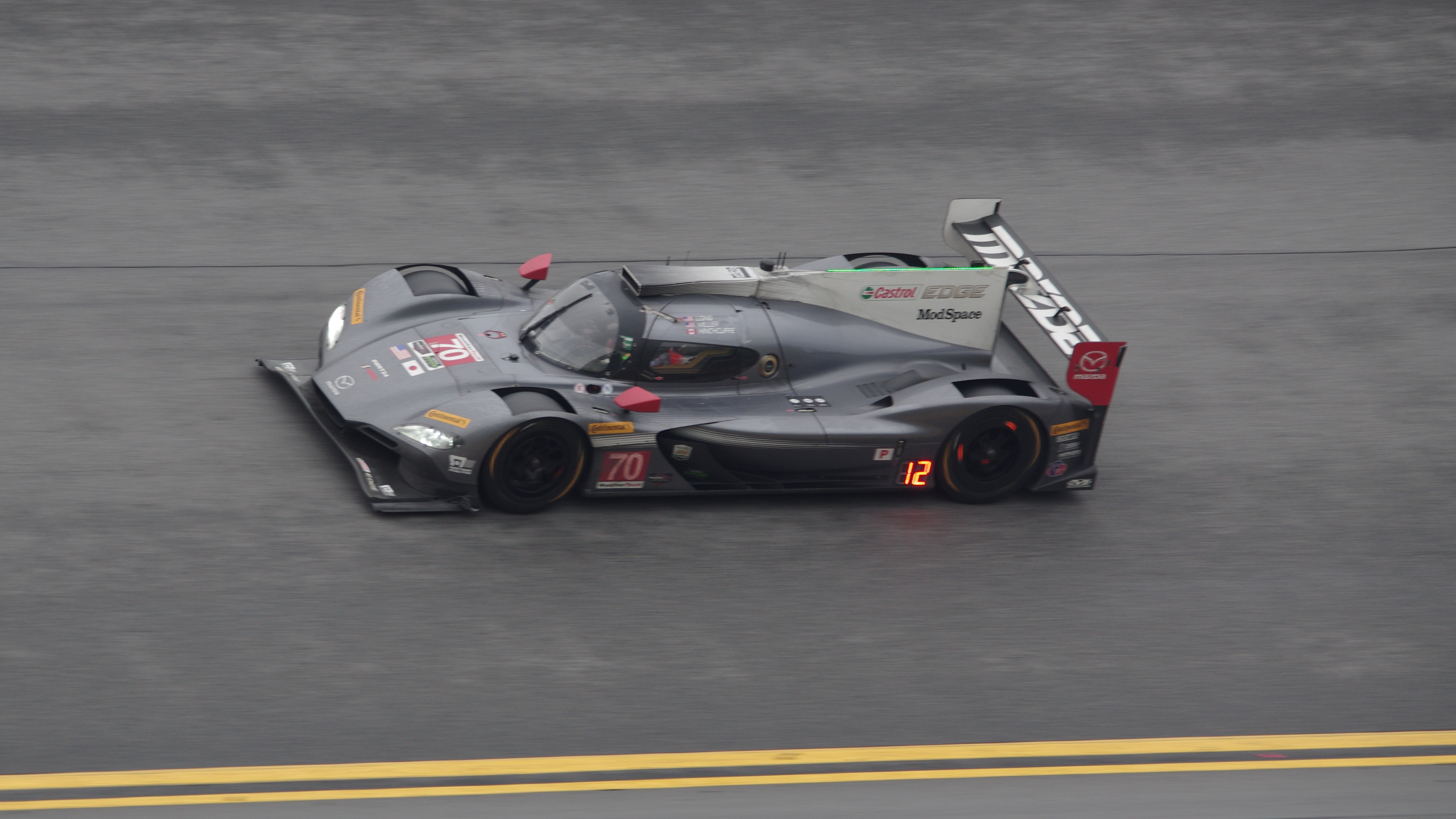
- Long racing for Mazda in 2017
- Nationality: (United States) American
- Born: March 1, 1982 (age 44) Poughkeepsie, New York, U.S.
- Categorisation: FIA Gold (until 2022); FIA Silver (2023–)

Tom Long (born March 1, 1982, in Poughkeepsie, New York) is an American racing driver.

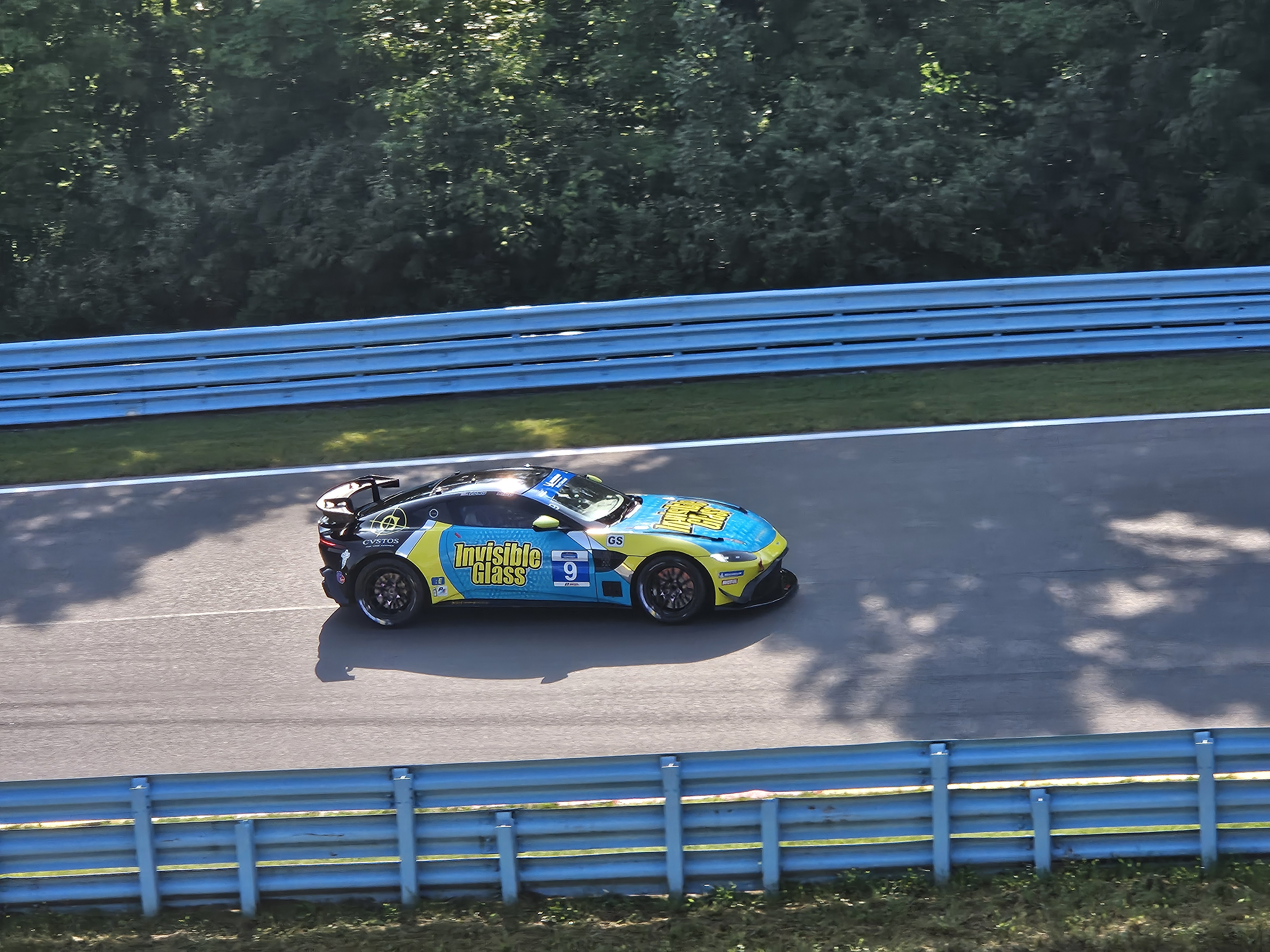
Long racing in the Michelin Pilot Challenge in 2024.

== Racing record ==
=== Career summary ===
Season	Series	Team	Races	Wins	Podiums	Points	Position
2007	Grand-Am Koni Challenge - ST	i-Moto	1	0	0	21	84th
2007	Grand-Am Koni Challenge - GS	Automatic Racing	1	0	0	237	7th
2008	Grand-Am Koni Challenge - ST	Freedom Autosport	8	0	2	122	7th
2008	Grand-Am Koni Challenge - GS	Kinetic Motorsports	2	0	0	35	57th
2008	Rolex Sports Car Series - GT	Automatic Racing	1	0	0	22	72nd
2008	Rolex Sports Car Series - GT	Matt Connolly Motorsports	2	0	0	22	72nd
2009	KONI Sports Car Challenge - ST	Freedom Autosport	11	1	4	191	11th
2009	KONI Sports Car Challenge - GS		1	0	0	26	62nd
2009	Rolex Sports Car Series - GT	Stevenson Motorsports	1	0	0	19	74th
2010	Continental Tire Sports Car Challenge - ST	Freedom Autosport	7	2	3	161	12th
2010	Rolex Sports Car Series - GT	SpeedSource Newman Wachs Racing	1	0	0	26	48th
2011	Continental Tire Sports Car Challenge - ST	Freedom Autosport	9	1	3	190	7th
2011	Rolex Sports Car Series - GT	Dempsey Racing	3	0	1	65	27th
2012	Continental Tire Sports Car Challenge - ST	Freedom Autosport	10	1	1	226	**2nd**
2012	Rolex Sports Car Series - GT	Dempsey Racing	7	0	0	113	27th
2013	Continental Tire Sports Car Challenge - ST	Freedom Autosport	11	1	3	189	9th
2013	Rolex Sports Car Series - GX	Mazdaspeed/Speedsource	12	4	9	380	**3rd**
2013	Pirelli World Challenge - GTS	Taggart Autosport	2	0	0	107	38th
2014	United SportsCar Championship - Prototype	SpeedSource	10	0	0	138	18th
2014	Continental Tire Sports Car Challenge - ST	Freedom Autosport	4	1	1	46	54th
2015	United SportsCar Championship - Prototype	SpeedSource	10	0	0	241	7th
2015	Continental Tire Sports Car Challenge - ST	Freedom Autosport	3	0	1	60	36th
2015	Maserati Trofeo		1	0	0	2	23rd
2016	IMSA SportsCar Championship - Prototype	Mazda Motorsports	10	0	0	258	6th
2017	IMSA SportsCar Championship - Prototype	Mazda Motorsports	7	0	1	168	11th
2017	Continental Tire Sports Car Challenge - ST	Freedom Autosport	3	0	1	73	24th
2018	Continental Tire SportsCar Challenge - TC	Compass Racing	10	4	8	318	**1st**
2019	Michelin Pilot Challenge - GS	Automatic Racing	3	0	0	36	50th
2020	Michelin Pilot Challenge - GS	Automatic Racing AMR	1	0	0	18	59th
2021	Michelin Pilot Challenge - GS	Forbush Performance	1	0	0	230	48th
2022	Michelin Pilot Challenge - GS	TGR Forbush Performance	5	0	0	570	42nd
2022	IMSA SportsCar Championship - GTD Pro	WTR - Racers Edge Motorsports	1	0	0	252	33rd
2023	Michelin Pilot Challenge - GS	Automatic Racing	1	0	0	260	43rd
2024	Michelin Pilot Challenge - GS	Automatic Racing AMR	2	0	0	210	55th
2026	IMSA VP Racing SportsCar Challenge - LMP3	Forbush Performance	1	0	0	240	28th

=== WeatherTech SportsCar Championship results ===
(key)(Races in bold indicate pole position. Races in italics indicate fastest race lap in class. Results are overall/class)

Year	Team	Class	Make	Engine	1	2	3	4	5	6	7	8	9	10	11	Rank	Points
2014	SpeedSource	P	Mazda Prototype	Mazda 2.2 L SKYACTIV-D (SH-VPTS) I4 Turbo (diesel)	DAY; 14	SEB; 11	LBH; 11	LGA; 7	DET; 9	WGL; 13	MOS; 10	IMS; 10	ELK; DNS	COA; 10	PET; 8	18th	138
2015	SpeedSource	P	Mazda Prototype	Mazda 2.2 L SKYACTIV-D (SH-VPTS) I4 Turbo (diesel)	DAY; 11	SIR; 11	LBH; 7	LGA; 9	DET; 7	WGL; 5	MSP; 7	ELK; 7	COA; 9	PET; 6		7th	241
2016	Mazda Motorsports	P	Mazda Prototype	Mazda MZ-2.0T 2.0 L I4 Turbo	DAY; 13	SIR; 8	LBH; 4	LAG; 8	DET; 4	WAT; 5	MSP; 5	ELK; 8	COA; 4	PET; 6		6th	258
2017	Mazda Motorsports	P	Mazda RT24-P	Mazda MZ-2.0T 2.0 L Turbo I4	DAY; 12	SEB; 8	LBH; 6	COA; 8	DET; 3	WGL; 9	MOS; 5	ELK	LGA	PET		11th	168
2022	WTR - Racers Edge Motorsports	GTD Pro	Acura NSX GT3 Evo22	Acura 3.5 L Turbo V6	DAY	SEB; 8	LBH	LGA	WGL	MOS	LIM	ELK	VIR	PET		33rd	252
