= 2011 Continental Tire Sports Car Challenge =

Grand touring and touring car race series

Seasons
- ← 2010 2012 →

The 2011 Continental Tire Sports Car Challenge was the eleventh running of the Grand-Am Cup Series, the a grand touring and touring car racing series run by the Grand American Road Racing Association. It began on January 27 and ran ten rounds.

== Schedule ==
Rnd	Event	Circuit	Date
1	Grand-Am 200	Daytona International Speedway	January 27–28
2	Kia 200	Homestead-Miami Speedway	March 4–5
3	Barber 200	Barber Motorsports Park	April 7–9
4	Bosch Engineering 200 at VIR	Virginia International Raceway	May 13–14
5	Memorial Day Classic	Lime Rock Park	May 27–28
6	Continental Tire 150	Watkins Glen International	June 2–3
7	Road America 200	Road America	June 23–24
8	Continental Tire Sports Car Festival	Mazda Raceway Laguna Seca	July 8–9
9	B+ Foundation Heroes 200	New Jersey Motorsports Park	July 22–23
10	EMCO Gears Classic	Mid-Ohio Sports Car Course	September 16–17

== Calendar and results ==
Rnd	Circuit	Class	Pole position	Fastest lap	Winner
1	Daytona	GS	No. 13 Rum Bum Racing	No. 13 Rum Bum Racing	No. 13 Rum Bum Racingr
1	Daytona	GS	(United States) Nick Longhi (United States) Matt Plumb	(United States) Nick Longhi (United States) Matt Plumb	(United States) Nick Longhi (United States) Matt Plumb
1	Daytona	ST	No. 171 APR Motorsport	No. 09 Trade Manage Racing	No. 171 APR Motorsport
1	Daytona	ST	(United States) Ian Baas (United States) Ryan Ellis	(United States) Steven Goldman (United States) Sam Schultz	(United States) Ian Baas (United States) Ryan Ellis
2	Homestead	GS	No. 13 Rum Bum Racing	No. 96 Turner Motorsport	No. 96 Turner Motorsport
2	Homestead	GS	(United States) Nick Longhi (United States) Matt Plumb	(United States) Bill Auberlen (Canada) Paul Dalla Lana	(United States) Bill Auberlen (Canada) Paul Dalla Lana
2	Homestead	ST	No. 98 89 Racing Team	No. 181 APR Motorsport	No. 171 APR Motorsport
2	Homestead	ST	(Canada) Daniel Blanchette (Canada) Jocelyn Hebert	(United States) Chris Gleason, Jr. (United States) Kevin Gleason	(United States) Ian Baas (United States) Ryan Ellis
3	Barber	GS	No. 15 Multimatic Motorsports	No. 61 Roush Performance	No. 15 Multimatic Motorsports
3	Barber	GS	(United States) Joe Foster (Canada) Scott Maxwell	(United States) Billy Johnson (United States) Jack Roush, Jr.	(United States) Joe Foster (Canada) Scott Maxwell
3	Barber	ST	No. 31 i-MOTO	No. 198 RSR Motorsports	No. 10 Kinetic Motorsports
3	Barber	ST	(United States) Mark Pombo (United States) Mathew Pombo	(United States) Sarah Cattaneo (United States) Owen Trinkler	(United States) Michael Galati (Sweden) Niclas Jönsson
4	VIR	GS	No. 45 Fall-Line Motorsports	No. 96 Turner Motorsport	No. 61 Roush Performance
4	VIR	GS	(United States) Al Carter (United States) Hugh Plumb	(United States) Bill Auberlen (Canada) Paul Dalla Lana	(United States) Billy Johnson (United States) Jack Roush, Jr.
4	VIR	ST	No. 73 DeMan Motorsport	No. 196 RSR Motorsports	No. 75 Compass360 Racing
4	VIR	ST	(United States) Rick DeMan (United States) David Murry	(United States) Ron Farmer (United States) Jason Hart	(United States) Ryan Eversley (Canada) Karl Thomson
5	Lime Rock	GS	No. 15 Multimatic Motorsports	No. 35 Subaru Road Racing Team	No. 13 Rum Bum Racing
5	Lime Rock	GS	(United States) Joe Foster (Canada) Scott Maxwell	(United States) John Heinricy (United States) Bret Spaude	(United States) Nick Longhi (United States) Matt Plumb
5	Lime Rock	ST	No. 25 Freedom Autosport	No. 10 Kinetic Motorsports	No. 25 Freedom Autosport
5	Lime Rock	ST	(United States) Tom Long (United States) Derek Whitis	(United States) Michael Galati (Sweden) Niclas Jönsson	(United States) Tom Long (United States) Derek Whitis
6	Watkins Glen	GS	No. 15 Multimatic Motorsports	No. 61 Roush Performance	No. 61 Roush Performance
6	Watkins Glen	GS	(United States) Joe Foster (Canada) Scott Maxwell	(United States) Billy Johnson (United States) Jack Roush, Jr.	(United States) Billy Johnson (United States) Jack Roush, Jr.
6	Watkins Glen	ST	No. 181 APR Motorsport	No. 30 i-MOTO	No. 181 APR Motorsport
6	Watkins Glen	ST	(United States) Chris Gleason, Jr. (United States) Kevin Gleason	(United States) Glenn Bocchino (United States) Chip Herr	(United States) Chris Gleason, Jr. (United States) Kevin Gleason
7	Road America	GS	No. 13 Rum Bum Racing	No. 9 Stevenson Motorsports	No. 9 Stevenson Motorsports
7	Road America	GS	(United States) Nick Longhi (United States) Matt Plumb	(United States) Matt Bell (United States) John Edwards	(United States) Matt Bell (United States) John Edwards
7	Road America	ST	No. 18 Insight Racing	No. 18 Insight Racing	No. 10 Kinetic Motorsports
7	Road America	ST	(United States) Tyler McQuarrie (France) Nico Rondet	(United States) Tyler McQuarrie (France) Nico Rondet	(United States) Michael Galati (Sweden) Niclas Jönsson
8	Laguna Seca	GS	No. 9 Stevenson Motorsports	No. 9 Stevenson Motorsports	No. 9 Stevenson Motorsports
8	Laguna Seca	GS	(United States) Matt Bell (United States) John Edwards	(United States) Matt Bell (United States) John Edwards	(United States) Matt Bell (United States) John Edwards
8	Laguna Seca	ST	No. 25 Freedom Autosport	No. 25 Freedom Autosport	No. 26 Freedom Autosport
8	Laguna Seca	ST	(United States) Tom Long (United States) Derek Whitis	(United States) Tom Long (United States) Derek Whitis	(United States) Andrew Carbonell (United States) Rhett O'Doski
9	New Jersey	GS	No. 68 Capaldi Racing	No. 13 Rum Bum Racing	No. 61 Roush Performance
9	New Jersey	GS	(United States) Tony Buffomante (United States) Kyle Gimple	(United States) Nick Longhi (United States) Matt Plumb	(United States) Billy Johnson (United States) Jack Roush, Jr.
9	New Jersey	ST	No. 27 Freedom Autosport	No. 198 RSR Motorsports	No. 198 RSR Motorsports
9	New Jersey	ST	(United States) Eric Foss (United States) Brad Rampelberg	(United States) Sarah Cattaneo (United States) Owen Trinkler	(United States) Sarah Cattaneo (United States) Owen Trinkler
10	Mid-Ohio	GS	No. 37 JBS Motorsports	No. 46 Fall-Line Motorsports	No. 13 Rum Bum Racing
10	Mid-Ohio	GS	(United States) James Gue (United States) Bret Seafuse	(United States) Mark Boden (United States) Terry Borcheller	(United States) Nick Longhi (United States) Matt Plumb
10	Mid-Ohio	ST	No. 198 RSR Motorsports	No. 195 RSR Motorsports	No. 31 i-MOTO
10	Mid-Ohio	ST	(United States) Sarah Cattaneo (United States) Owen Trinkler	(United States) Chris Puskar (United States) Dicky Riegel	(United States) Mark Pombo (United States) Mathew Pombo
