= 2010 Continental Tire Sports Car Challenge =

Motor racing competition

Seasons
- ← 2009 2011 →

The 2010 Continental Tire Sports Car Challenge was the tenth running of the Grand-Am Cup series and the first season under Continental Tire sponsorship. It began on January 29 at Daytona International Speedway and ended on September 12 at Miller Motorsports Park.

Despite winning only one race all season, top ten finishes in each of the ten races enabled Charles Espenlaub and Charles Putman of Fall-Line Motorsports to win the Grand Sport class title. Espenlaub and Putman finished six points clear of double race-winners Michael Marsal and Joey Hand of Turner Motorsport, and eight clear of another pair of double race-winners, Roush Performance's Jack Roush Jr. and Billy Johnson. Rum Bum Racing's Matt Plumb won the most races, taking three victories – one victory with Gian Bacardi and two with Nick Longhi – but finished 80 points behind Espenlaub and Putman. Single race victories were taken by Rehagen Racing's Dean Martin and Bob Michaelian at Barber Motorsports Park, as well as The Racer's Group's Steve Bertheau and Spencer Pumpelly at Mid-Ohio.

The Street Tuner class was just as hotly contested as the Grand Sport class, and after ten races, the top two teams – Lawson Aschenbach and David Thilenius of Compass360 Racing, and Bill Heumann and Seth Thomas of BimmerWorld/GearWrench – finished tied on 274 points. Both teams took two victories and two second places, but the third place for Aschenbach and Thilenius at the final race of the season at Miller Motorsports Park allowed them to clinch the championship. Freedom Autosport pair Tom Long and Derek Whitis, and RSR Motorsports duo Randy Smalley and Owen Trinkler also took two victories over the season, with single victories claimed by APR Motorsport's Ian Baas and Aaron Povoledo, as well as the team-mates of Aschenbach and Thilenius, Ryan Eversley and Zach Lutz.

Debuting in 2010 was a new Mustang for Multimatic Motorsports painted to look like the Trans Am Series Boss 302s of Parnelli Jones and George Follmer. Also debuting was a new Sunoco sponsored Camaro resembling the original Penske Camaros of Trans-Am.

== Schedule ==
The schedule was announced on October 15, 2009. Nine of the ten rounds supported the 2010 Rolex Sports Car Series, with a stand-alone round at Circuit Trois-Rivières.

Rnd	Circuit	Date
1	Daytona International Speedway	January 29
2	Homestead-Miami Speedway	March 6–7
3	Barber Motorsports Park	April 9–10
4	Virginia International Raceway	April 24–25
5	Lime Rock Park	May 28–29
6	Watkins Glen International	June 5–6
7	Mid-Ohio Sports Car Course	June 19–20
8	New Jersey Motorsports Park	July 17–18
9	Circuit Trois-Rivières	August 13
10	Miller Motorsports Park	September 11–12

== Calendar ==
Rnd	Circuit	Pole position	Fastest lap	Winner
1	Daytona International Speedway	#46 Fall-Line Motorsports	#19 Rum Bum Racing	#19 Rum Bum Racing
1	Daytona International Speedway	(United States) Mark Boden (United States) Andy Pilgrim	(United States) Gian Bacardi (United States) Matt Plumb	(United States) Gian Bacardi (United States) Matt Plumb
1	Daytona International Speedway	#25 Freedom Autosport	#197 RSR Motorsports	#74 Compass360 Racing
1	Daytona International Speedway	(United States) Tom Long (United States) Derek Whitis	(United States) Sarah Cattaneo (United States) V. J. Mirzayan	(United States) Lawson Aschenbach (United States) David Thilenius
2	Homestead-Miami Speedway	#61 Roush Performance	#15 Multimatic Motorsports	#61 Roush Performance
2	Homestead-Miami Speedway	(United States) Billy Johnson (United States) Jack Roush Jr.	(United States) Joe Foster (Canada) Scott Maxwell	(United States) Billy Johnson (United States) Jack Roush Jr.
2	Homestead-Miami Speedway	#197 RSR Motorsports	#81 BimmerWorld/GearWrench	#25 Freedom Autosport
2	Homestead-Miami Speedway	(United States) Sarah Cattaneo (United States) V. J. Mirzayan	(United States) Bill Heumann (United States) Seth Thomas	(United States) Tom Long (United States) Derek Whitis
3	Barber Motorsports Park	#15 Multimatic Motorsports	#16 Multimatic Motorsports	#52 Rehagen Racing
3	Barber Motorsports Park	(United States) Joe Foster (Canada) Scott Maxwell	(United States) Gunnar Jeannette (United States) Frankie Montecalvo	(United States) Dean Martin (United States) Bob Michaelian
3	Barber Motorsports Park	#80 BimmerWorld/GearWrench	#198 RSR Motorsports	#25 Freedom Autosport
3	Barber Motorsports Park	(United States) David White (United States) James Clay	(United Kingdom) Craig Conway (United States) B. J. Zacharias	(United States) Tom Long (United States) Derek Whitis
4	Virginia International Raceway	#61 Roush Performance	#13 Rum Bum Racing	#97 Turner Motorsport
4	Virginia International Raceway	(United States) Billy Johnson (United States) Jack Roush Jr.	(United States) Matt Plumb (United States) Gian Bacardi	(United States) Joey Hand (United States) Michael Marsal
4	Virginia International Raceway	#196 RSR Motorsports	#74 Compass360 Racing	#75 Compass360 Racing
4	Virginia International Raceway	(United States) B. J. Zacharias (United States) Owen Trinkler	(United States) Lawson Aschenbach (United States) David Thilenius	(United States) Ryan Eversley (United States) Zach Lutz
5	Lime Rock Park	#61 Roush Performance	#96 Turner Motorsport	#97 Turner Motorsport
5	Lime Rock Park	(United States) Billy Johnson (United States) Jack Roush Jr.	(United States) Bill Auberlen (United States) Paul Dalla Lana	(United States) Joey Hand (United States) Michael Marsal
5	Lime Rock Park	#95 Turner Motorsport	#98 89 Racing Team	#81 BimmerWorld/GearWrench
5	Lime Rock Park	(United States) Don Salama (United States) Will Turner	(Canada) Cyril Hamelin (Canada) Jocelyn Hebert	(United States) Bill Heumann (United States) Seth Thomas
6	Watkins Glen International	#46 Fall-Line Motorsports	#41 The Racer's Group	#48 Fall-Line Motorsports
6	Watkins Glen International	(United States) Mark Boden (United States) Bryan Sellers	(United States) Steve Bertheau (United States) Spencer Pumpelly	(United States) Charles Espenlaub (United States) Charles Putman
6	Watkins Glen International	#03 Team MER	#21 GS Motorsports	#74 Compass360 Racing
6	Watkins Glen International	(United States) Justin Piscitell (United States) Jason Saini	(Canada) Andrew Danyliw (Canada) Jamie Holtom	(United States) Lawson Aschenbach (United States) David Thilenius
7	Mid-Ohio Sports Car Course	#6 Stevenson Motorsports	#07 Euro Motorworks Racing	#41 The Racer's Group
7	Mid-Ohio Sports Car Course	(United States) Matt Bell (United States) Jeff Bucknum	(United States) Terry Heath (United States) Bryan Sellers	(United States) Steve Bertheau (United States) Spencer Pumpelly
7	Mid-Ohio Sports Car Course	#80 BimmerWorld/GearWrench	#75 Compass360 Racing	#81 BimmerWorld/GearWrench
7	Mid-Ohio Sports Car Course	(United States) David White (United States) James Clay	(United States) Ryan Eversley (United States) Zach Lutz	(United States) Bill Heumann (United States) Seth Thomas
8	New Jersey Motorsports Park	#61 Roush Performance	#97 Turner Motorsport	#61 Roush Performance
8	New Jersey Motorsports Park	(United States) Billy Johnson (United States) Jack Roush Jr.	(United States) Joey Hand (United States) Michael Marsal	(United States) Billy Johnson (United States) Jack Roush Jr.
8	New Jersey Motorsports Park	#18 RRT Racing	#64 Next Generation Motorsports	#198 RSR Motorsports
8	New Jersey Motorsports Park	(United States) Paul Gerrard (Denmark) Martin Jensen	(United States) Shawn Dewey (United States) Ted Giovanis	(United States) Randy Smalley (United States) Owen Trinkler
9	Circuit Trois-Rivières	#15 Multimatic Motorsports	#13 Rum Bum Racing	#13 Rum Bum Racing
9	Circuit Trois-Rivières	(United States) Joe Foster (Canada) Scott Maxwell	(United States) Matt Plumb (United States) Nick Longhi	(United States) Matt Plumb (United States) Nick Longhi
9	Circuit Trois-Rivières	#98 89 Racing Team	#198 RSR Motorsports	#198 RSR Motorsports
9	Circuit Trois-Rivières	(Canada) Cyril Hamelin (Canada) Jocelyn Hebert	(United States) Randy Smalley (United States) Owen Trinkler	(United States) Randy Smalley (United States) Owen Trinkler
10	Miller Motorsports Park	#6 Stevenson Motorsports	#46 Fall-Line Motorsports	#13 Rum Bum Racing
10	Miller Motorsports Park	(United States) Matt Bell (United States) Jeff Bucknum	(United States) Mark Boden (United States) Bryan Sellers	(United States) Matt Plumb (United States) Nick Longhi
10	Miller Motorsports Park	#91 APR Motorsport	#91 APR Motorsport	#91 APR Motorsport
10	Miller Motorsports Park	(United States) Ian Baas (Canada) Aaron Povoledo	(United States) Ian Baas (Canada) Aaron Povoledo	(United States) Ian Baas (Canada) Aaron Povoledo
