= 2008 KONI Challenge Series =

Motor racing competition

Seasons
- ← 2007 2009 →

The 2008 KONI Challenge Series was the eighth season of the KONI Sports Car Challenge, and the second under the sponsorship of KONI. It began on January 24 at Daytona International Speedway and ended on October 5 at Virginia International Raceway.

== Calendar ==
Round	Circuit	Location	Date
1	(United States) Daytona International Speedway	Daytona Beach, Florida	January 24–25
2	(United States) Lime Rock Park *	Lakeville, Connecticut	May 23–26
3	(Canada) Mosport	Bowmanville, Ontario	June 14–15
4	(United States) Mid-Ohio Sports Car Course #	Lexington, Ohio	June 20–22
5	(United States) Watkins Glen International	Watkins Glen, New York	July 4–5
6	(United States) Barber Motorsports Park +	Birmingham, Alabama	July 18–19
7	(United States) Iowa Speedway	Newton, Iowa	August 9–10
8	(Canada) Circuit Trois-Rivières *	Trois-Rivières, Quebec	August 15–17
9	(United States) New Jersey Motorsports Park	Millville, New Jersey	August 29–31
10	(United States) Miller Motorsports Park	Tooele, Utah	September 19–21
11	(United States) Virginia International Raceway *	Alton, Virginia	October 4–5

* Split classes
# ST class only
+ GS class only

== Race results ==
Rnd	Circuit	GS Winning Team	ST Winning Team
Rnd	Circuit	GS Winning Drivers	ST Winning Drivers
1	Daytona	(United States) #83 BGB Motorsports	(United States) #31 i-MOTO Racing
1	Daytona	(United States) Craig Stanton (United States) Tim Traver	(United States) Glenn Bocchino (Canada) Nick Wittmer
2	Lime Rock	(United States) #09 Automatic Racing	(Canada) #01 Georgian Bay Motorsports
2	Lime Rock	(United States) Jeff Segal (United States) Jep Thornton	(United States) Eric Curran (Canada) Jamie Holtom
3	Mosport	(United States) #55 Hyper Sport	(Canada) #01 Georgian Bay Motorsports
3	Mosport	(United States) Joe Foster (Canada) Scott Maxwell	(United States) Eric Curran (Canada) Jamie Holtom
4	Mid-Ohio	did not participate	(United States) #111 ICY/Phoenix Racing
4	Mid-Ohio	did not participate	(United States) Chuck Hemmingson (United States) Kristian Skavnes
5	Watkins Glen	(United States) #83 BGB Motorsports	(Canada) #74 Compass360 Racing
5	Watkins Glen	(United States) David Murry (United States) Tim Traver	(United States) Adam Burrows (United States) Trevor Hopwood
6	Barber	(United States) #55 Hyper Sport	did not participate
6	Barber	(United States) Joe Foster (Canada) Scott Maxwell	did not participate
7	Iowa	(United States) #41 TRG	(Canada) #01 Georgian Bay Motorsports
7	Iowa	(United States) Andy Lally (United States) Scott Schroeder	(United States) Lawson Aschenbach (Canada) Jamie Holtom
8	Trois-Rivières	(United States) #79 Kinetic Motorsports	(Canada) #76 Compass360 Racing
8	Trois-Rivières	(Canada) Marc-Antoine Camirand (United States) Andy Lally	(United States) Adam Burrows (United States) Trevor Hopwood
9	New Jersey	(United States) #83 BGB Motorsports	(United States) #29 Bill Fenton Motorsports
9	New Jersey	(United States) Jon Miller (United States) Craig Stanton	(United States) Bob Beede (United States) Bill Fenton (United States) Matt Plumb
10	Miller	(United States) #96 Turner Motorsport	(Canada) #01 Georgian Bay Motorsports
10	Miller	(United States) Matthew Alhadeff (United States) Bill Auberlen	(United States) Eric Curran (Canada) Jamie Holtom
11	Virginia	(United States) #60 Rehagen Racing	(Canada) #110 Georgian Bay Motorsports
11	Virginia	(United States) Mike Canney (United States) Hugh Plumb (United States) Matt Plumb	(United States) Lawson Aschenbach (United States) Ken Dobson (Canada) Jamie Holtom
