= 2014 Petit Le Mans =

Sportscar endurance race in Georgia, US

The Track map of Road Atlanta

The 17th Annual Petit Le Mans presented by Mazda was the 2014 edition of the Petit Le Mans automotive endurance race, held on October 3, 2014, at the Road Atlanta circuit in Braselton, Georgia, United States. This marked the first Petit Le Mans run under the newly merged Tudor United Sportscar Championship. As part of the new series, Daytona Prototype endurance-style cars were eligible to participate for the first time.

The race was won by Wayne Taylor Racing in 10 hours (400 laps). A record number of 13 cautions was set for the event.

== Background ==
=== Preview ===
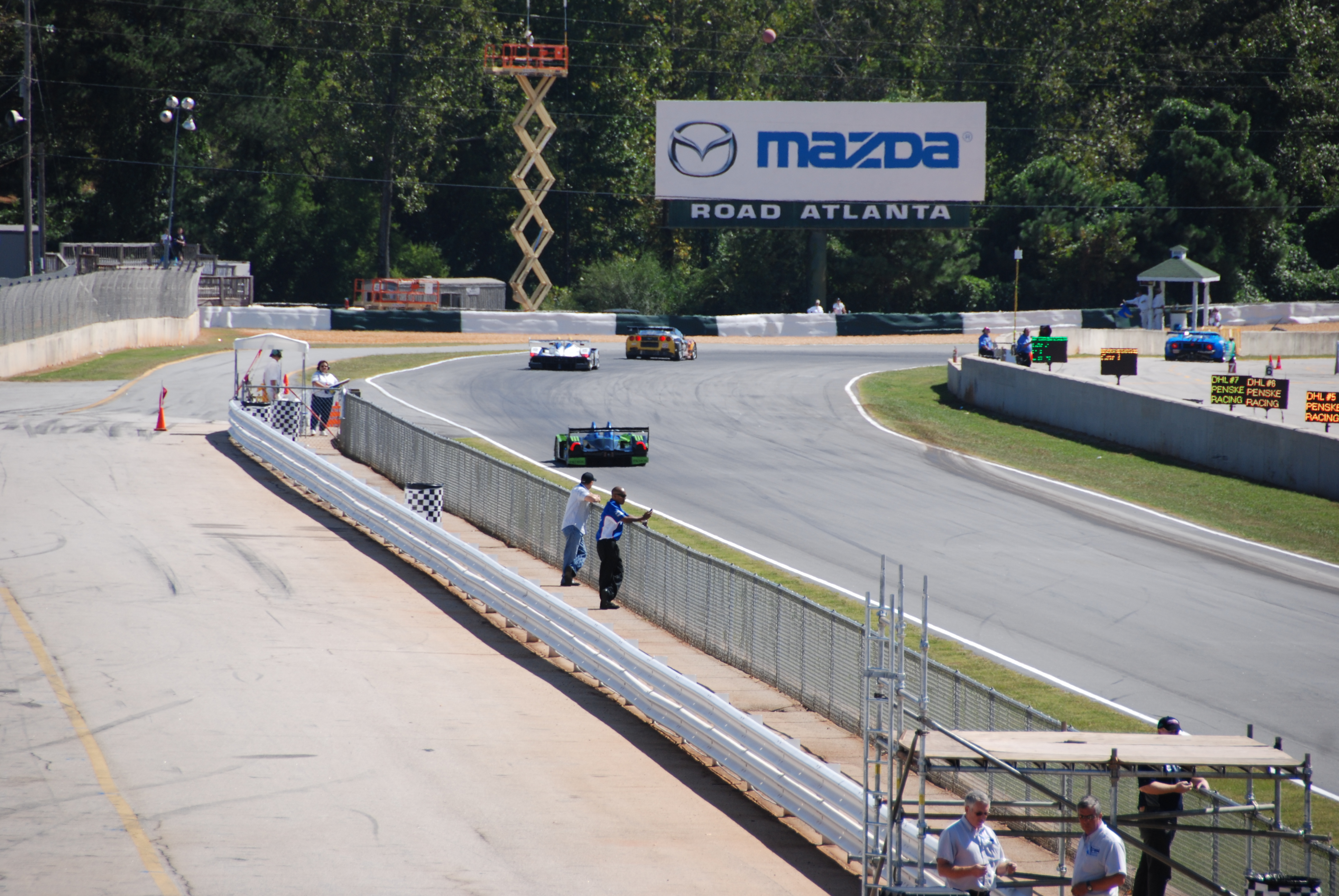
Road Atlanta, where the race was held.

International Motor Sports Association (IMSA) president Scott Atherton confirmed that the race was part of the 2014 United SportsCar Championship schedule in September 2013. It was the first year that the race was part of the series calendar, and the seventeenth annual running of the race. The race was the last of 2014's thirteen scheduled IMSA automobile endurance races, and the last of four North American Endurance Cup (NAEC) events. It was held at the 12-turn, 2.540-mile (4.088 km) Road Atlanta in Braselton, Georgia on October 3, 2014.

== Qualifying ==
=== Qualifying results ===
Pole positions in each class are indicated in bold and with ‡.

| Pos. | Class | No. | Entry | Driver | Time | Gap | Grid |
|---|---|---|---|---|---|---|---|
| 1 | **P** | **5** | **(United States) Action Express Racing** | **(Brazil) Christian Fittipaldi** | **1:14.508** | — | 1‡ |
| 2 | P | 10 | (United States) Wayne Taylor Racing | (United States) Ricky Taylor | 1:14.797 | +0.289 | 2 |
| 3 | P | 90 | (United States) Spirit of Daytona Racing | (United Kingdom) Richard Westbrook | 1:14.920 | +0.412 | 3 |
| 4 | P | 01 | (United States) Chip Ganassi Racing with Felix Sabates | (United States) Scott Pruett | 1:15.224 | +0.716 | 4 |
| 5 | P | 0 | (United States) DeltaWing Racing Cars | (United Kingdom) Katherine Legge | 1:15.317 | +0.809 | 5 |
| 6 | P | 60 | (United States) Michael Shank Racing with Curb/Agajanian | (Brazil) Oswaldo Negri | 1:15.346 | +0.838 | 6 |
| 7 | P | 31 | (United States) Marsh Racing | (United States) Eric Curran | 1:16.052 | +1.544 | 7 |
| 8 | **PC** | **08** | **(United States) RSR Racing** | **(United Kingdom) Jack Hawksworth** | **1:16.210** | **+1.702** | 8‡ |
| 9 | PC | 09 | (United States) RSR Racing | (Brazil) Bruno Junqueira | 1:16.471 | +1.963 | 9 |
| 10 | PC | 25 | (United States) 8Star Motorsports | (United Kingdom) Tom Kimber-Smith | 1:16.599 | +2.091 | 10 |
| 11 | PC | 54 | (United States) CORE Autosport | (United States) Colin Braun | 1:16.612 | +2.104 | 11 |
| 12 | PC | 52 | (United States) PR1/Mathiasen Motorsports | (United States) Gunnar Jeannette | 1:16.848 | +2.340 | 12 |
| 13 | PC | 87 | (United States) BAR1 Motorsports | (United Kingdom) Martin Plowman | 1:17.082 | +2.574 | 13 |
| 14 | PC | 85 | (United States) JDC-Miller MotorSports | (South Africa) Stephen Simpson | 1:17.203 | +2.695 | 14 |
| 15 | PC | 88 | (United States) BAR1 Motorsports | (United Kingdom) Johnny Mowlem | 1:17.367 | +2.859 | 15 |
| 16 | PC | 38 | (United States) Performance Tech Motorsports | (Canada) David Ostella | 1:17.533 | +3.025 | 16 |
| 17 | **GTLM** | **911** | **(United States) Porsche North America** | **(United Kingdom) Nick Tandy** | **1:18.350** | **+3.842** | 17‡ |
| 18 | PC | 7 | (United States) Starworks Motorsport | (United States) Ryan Eversley | 1:18.412 | +3.904 | 18 |
| 19 | GTLM | 62 | (United States) Risi Competizione | (Italy) Giancarlo Fisichella | 1:18.687 | +4.179 | 19 |
| 20 | GTLM | 17 | (United States) Team Falken Tire | (United States) Bryan Sellers | 1:18.707 | +4.199 | 20 |
| 21 | GTLM | 93 | (United States) SRT Motorsports | (United States) Jonathan Bomarito | 1:18.804 | +4.296 | 21 |
| 22 | GTLM | 912 | (United States) Porsche North America | (Denmark) Michael Christensen | 1:18.848 | +4.340 | 22 |
| 23 | GTLM | 3 | (United States) Corvette Racing | (Spain) Antonio García | 1:18.979 | +4.471 | 23 |
| 24 | P | 70 | (United States) Speedsource | (United States) Tom Long | 1:19.074 | +4.566 | 24 |
| 25 | GTLM | 56 | (United States) BMW Team RLL | (Germany) Dirk Müller | 1:19.143 | +4.635 | 25 |
| 26 | GTLM | 91 | (United States) SRT Motorsports | (Belgium) Marc Goossens | 1:19.146 | +4.638 | 26 |
| 27 | GTLM | 4 | (United States) Porsche North America | (United States) Tommy Milner | 1:19.256 | +4.748 | 27 |
| 28 | GTLM | 57 | (United States) Krohn Racing | (Italy) Andrea Bertolini | 1:19.621 | +5.113 | 28 |
| 29 | GTLM | 55 | (United States) BMW Team RLL | (United States) Bill Auberlen | 1:20.467 | +5.959 | 29 |
| 30 | PC | 8 | (United States) Starworks Motorsport | (Netherlands) Renger van der Zande | 1:20.665 | +6.157 | 30 |
| 31 | **GTD** | **007** | **(United States) TRG-AMR** | **(Australia) James Davison** | **1:22.254** | **+7.746** | 31‡ |
| 32 | GTD | 58 | (United States) Snow Racing | (Belgium) Jan Heylen | 1:22.395 | +7.887 | 32 |
| 33 | GTD | 73 | (United States) Park Place Motorsports | (France) Kévin Estre | 1:22.471 | +7.963 | 33 |
| 34 | GTD | 33 | (United States) Riley Motorsports | (Netherlands) Jeroen Bleekemolen | 1:22.579 | +8.071 | 34 |
| 35 | GTD | 94 | (United States) Turner Motorsport | (United States) Dane Cameron | 1:22.682 | +8.174 | 35 |
| 36 | GTD | 23 | (United States) Team Seattle/Alex Job Racing | (Germany) Mario Farnbacher | 1:22.776 | +8.268 | 36 |
| 37 | GTD | 27 | (United States) Dempsey Racing | (United States) Andrew Davis | 1:23.121 | +8.613 | 37 |
| 38 | GTD | 22 | (United States) Alex Job Racing | (United States) Leh Keen | 1:23.237 | +8.729 | 38 |
| 39 | GTD | 44 | (United States) Magnus Racing | (United States) Andy Lally | 1:23.251 | +8.743 | 30 |
| 40 | GTD | 49 | (Italy) Spirit of Race | (Italy) Marco Cioci | 1:23.339 | +8.831 | 40 |
| 41 | GTD | 81 | (United States) GB Autosport | (Republic of Ireland) Damien Faulkner | 1:23.409 | +8.901 | 41 |
| 42 | GTD | 555 | (Canada) AIM Autosport | (United States) Townsend Bell | 1:23.588 | +9.080 | 42 |
| 43 | GTD | 48 | (United States) Paul Miller Racing | (United Kingdom) Matthew Bell | 1:23.592 | +9.084 | 43 |
| 44 | GTD | 45 | (United States) Flying Lizard Motorsports | (United States) Spencer Pumpelly | 1:23.595 | +9.087 | 44 |
| 45 | GTD | 63 | (United States) Scuderia Corsa | (Italy) Alessandro Balzan | 1:23.685 | +9.177 | 45 |
| 46 | GTD | 51 | (Italy) Spirit of Race | (Italy) Michele Rugolo | 1:23.700 | +9.192 | 46 |
| 47 | GTD | 19 | (Belgium) Mühlner Motorsports America | (United States) Mark Kvamme | 1:25.135 | +10.627 | 47 |
| 48 | GTD | 35 | (United States) Flying Lizard Motorsports | (United States) Seth Neiman | 1:26.910 | +12.402 | 48 |
| 49 | P | 07 | (United States) Speedsource | (United States) Tristan Nunez | 4:25.488^{1} | +3:11.080 | 49 |
| 50 | P | 9 | (United States) Action Express Racing | (United States) Brian Frisselle | 4:51.014^{2} | +3:36.506 | 50 |
| 51 | P | 42 | (France) OAK Racing | (United Kingdom) Alex Brundle | No time^{3} | — | 51 |
| 52 | GTD | 18 | (Belgium) Mühlner Motorsports America | None | No Time Established | | 52 |
| 53 | GTD | 30 | (United States) NGT Motorsport | None | No Time Established | | 53 |
| 54 | GTD | 71 | (United States) Park Place Motorsports | None | No Time Established | | 54 |
Sources:

- ^{1} The No. 42 OAK Racing entry had its two fastest laps deleted as penalty for causing a red flag during its qualifying session.
- ^{2} The No. 9 Action Express Racing entry had its two fastest laps deleted as penalty for causing a red flag during its qualifying session.
- ^{3} The No. 07 Speedsource entry had its two fastest laps deleted as penalty for causing a red flag during its qualifying session.

== Race ==
=== Race result ===
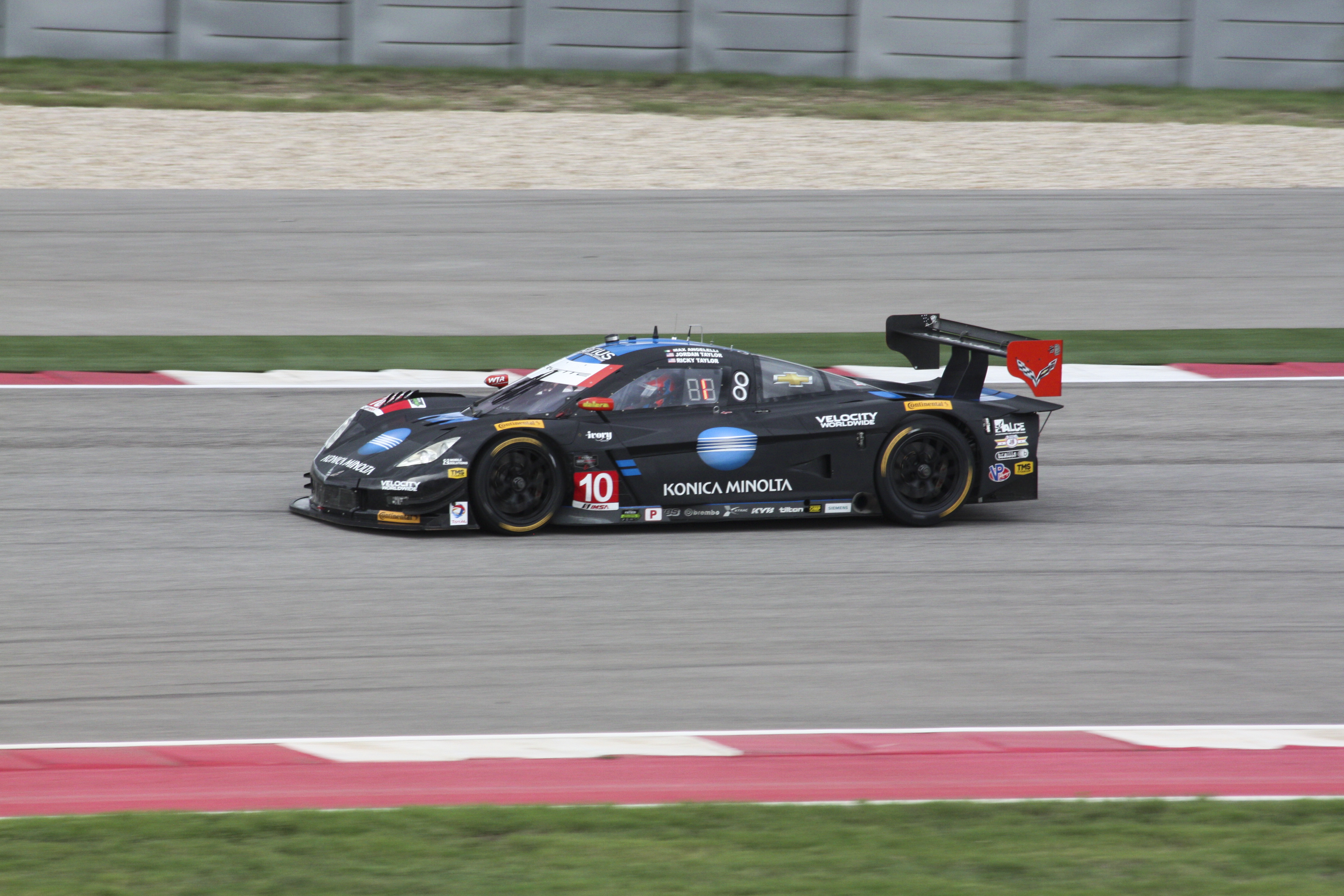
The No. 10 Wayne Taylor Racing car was the overall winner of the race.

Class winners in bold.

Final race classification
| Pos | Class | PIC | No. | Team | Drivers | Chassis | Tire | Laps |
| Pos | Class | PIC | No. | Team | Drivers | Engine | Tire | Laps |
|---|---|---|---|---|---|---|---|---|
| 1 | **P** | **1** | **10** | **(United States) Wayne Taylor Racing** | **(United States) Ricky Taylor (United States) Jordan Taylor (Italy) Max Angelelli** | **Dallara Corvette DP** | C | **400** |
| 1 | **P** | **1** | **10** | **(United States) Wayne Taylor Racing** | **(United States) Ricky Taylor (United States) Jordan Taylor (Italy) Max Angelelli** | **Chevrolet LS9 5.5 L V8** | C | **400** |
| 2 | P | 2 | 5 | (United States) Action Express Racing | (Portugal) João Barbosa (Brazil) Christian Fittipaldi (France) Sébastien Bourdais | Coyote Corvette DP | C | 400 |
| 2 | P | 2 | 5 | (United States) Action Express Racing | (Portugal) João Barbosa (Brazil) Christian Fittipaldi (France) Sébastien Bourdais | Chevrolet LS9 5.5 L V8 | C | 400 |
| 3 | P | 3 | 31 | (United States) Chip Ganassi Racing with Felix Sabates | (United States) Scott Pruett (Mexico) Memo Rojas (New Zealand) Scott Dixon | Riley MkXXVI | C | 399 |
| 3 | P | 3 | 31 | (United States) Chip Ganassi Racing with Felix Sabates | (United States) Scott Pruett (Mexico) Memo Rojas (New Zealand) Scott Dixon | Ford EcoBoost 3.5 L Turbo V6 | C | 399 |
| 4 | P | 4 | 0 | (United States) DeltaWing Racing Cars | (United Kingdom) Andy Meyrick (United Kingdom) Katherine Legge (Colombia) Gabby Chaves | DeltaWing DWC13 | C | 395 |
| 4 | P | 4 | 0 | (United States) DeltaWing Racing Cars | (United Kingdom) Andy Meyrick (United Kingdom) Katherine Legge (Colombia) Gabby Chaves | Élan 1.9 L Turbo I4 | C | 395 |
| 5 | **PC** | **1** | **8** | **(United States) Starworks Motorsport** | **(Netherlands) Renger van der Zande (Germany) Mirco Schultis (Venezuela) Alex Popow** | **Oreca FLM09** | C | **395** |
| 5 | **PC** | **1** | **8** | **(United States) Starworks Motorsport** | **(Netherlands) Renger van der Zande (Germany) Mirco Schultis (Venezuela) Alex Popow** | **Chevrolet 6.2 L V8** | C | **395** |
| 6 | PC | 2 | 54 | (United States) CORE Autosport | (United States) Jon Bennett (United States) Colin Braun (United States) James Gue | Oreca FLM09 | C | 395 |
| 6 | PC | 2 | 54 | (United States) CORE Autosport | (United States) Jon Bennett (United States) Colin Braun (United States) James Gue | Chevrolet 6.2 L V8 | C | 395 |
| 7 | PC | 3 | 52 | (United States) PR1/Mathiasen Motorsports | (United States) Gunnar Jeannette (United States) Frankie Montecalvo | Oreca FLM09 | C | 395 |
| 7 | PC | 3 | 52 | (United States) PR1/Mathiasen Motorsports | (United States) Gunnar Jeannette (United States) Frankie Montecalvo | Chevrolet 6.2 L V8 | C | 395 |
| 8 | PC | 4 | 08 | (United States) RSR Racing | (United Kingdom) Jack Hawksworth (Canada) Chris Cumming (United States) Rusty Mitchell | Oreca FLM09 | C | 394 |
| 8 | PC | 4 | 08 | (United States) RSR Racing | (United Kingdom) Jack Hawksworth (Canada) Chris Cumming (United States) Rusty Mitchell | Chevrolet 6.2 L V8 | C | 394 |
| 9 | **GTLM** | **1** | **17** | **(United States) Team Falken Tire** | **(United States) Bryan Sellers (Germany) Wolf Henzler (Germany) Marco Holzer** | **Porsche 911 RSR** | F | **391** |
| 9 | **GTLM** | **1** | **17** | **(United States) Team Falken Tire** | **(United States) Bryan Sellers (Germany) Wolf Henzler (Germany) Marco Holzer** | **Porsche 4.0 L Flat-6** | F | **391** |
| 10 | GTLM | 2 | 912 | (United States) Porsche North America | (United States) Patrick Long (Denmark) Michael Christensen (New Zealand) Earl Bamber | Porsche 911 RSR | M | 391 |
| 10 | GTLM | 2 | 912 | (United States) Porsche North America | (United States) Patrick Long (Denmark) Michael Christensen (New Zealand) Earl Bamber | Porsche 4.0 L Flat-6 | M | 391 |
| 11 | GTLM | 3 | 91 | (United States) SRT Motorsports | (Canada) Kuno Wittmer (Belgium) Marc Goossens (United States) Ryan Hunter-Reay | SRT Viper GTS-R | M | 391 |
| 11 | GTLM | 3 | 91 | (United States) SRT Motorsports | (Canada) Kuno Wittmer (Belgium) Marc Goossens (United States) Ryan Hunter-Reay | SRT 8.0 L V10 | M | 391 |
| 12 | GTLM | 4 | 4 | (United States) Corvette Racing | (United States) Tommy Milner (United Kingdom) Oliver Gavin (Australia) Ryan Briscoe | Chevrolet Corvette C7.R | M | 391 |
| 12 | GTLM | 4 | 4 | (United States) Corvette Racing | (United States) Tommy Milner (United Kingdom) Oliver Gavin (Australia) Ryan Briscoe | Chevrolet LT5.5 5.5 L V8 | M | 391 |
| 13 | GTLM | 5 | 911 | (United States) Porsche North America | (United Kingdom) Nick Tandy (Germany) Jörg Bergmeister (France) Patrick Pilet | Porsche 911 RSR | M | 390 |
| 13 | GTLM | 5 | 911 | (United States) Porsche North America | (United Kingdom) Nick Tandy (Germany) Jörg Bergmeister (France) Patrick Pilet | Porsche 4.0 L Flat-6 | M | 390 |
| 14 | GTLM | 6 | 93 | (United States) SRT Motorsports | (United States) Jonathan Bomarito (Germany) Dominik Farnbacher (United Kingdom) Rob Bell | SRT Viper GTS-R | M | 389 |
| 14 | GTLM | 6 | 93 | (United States) SRT Motorsports | (United States) Jonathan Bomarito (Germany) Dominik Farnbacher (United Kingdom) Rob Bell | SRT 8.0 L V10 | M | 389 |
| 15 | P | 5 | 31 | (United States) Marsh Racing | (United States) Eric Curran (United States) Boris Said (Italy) Max Papis | Coyote Corvette DP | C | 388 |
| 15 | P | 5 | 31 | (United States) Marsh Racing | (United States) Eric Curran (United States) Boris Said (Italy) Max Papis | Chevrolet LS9 5.5 L V8 | C | 388 |
| 16 | GTLM | 7 | 56 | (United States) BMW Team RLL | (United States) John Edwards (Germany) Dirk Müller (Germany) Dirk Werner | BMW Z4 GTE | M | 388 |
| 16 | GTLM | 7 | 56 | (United States) BMW Team RLL | (United States) John Edwards (Germany) Dirk Müller (Germany) Dirk Werner | BMW 4.4 L V8 | M | 388 |
| 17 | GTLM | 8 | 3 | (United States) Corvette Racing | (Denmark) Jan Magnussen (Spain) Antonio García (Australia) Ryan Briscoe | Chevrolet Corvette C7.R | M | 388 |
| 17 | GTLM | 8 | 3 | (United States) Corvette Racing | (Denmark) Jan Magnussen (Spain) Antonio García (Australia) Ryan Briscoe | Chevrolet LT5.5 5.5 L V8 | M | 388 |
| 18 | PC | 5 | 7 | (United States) Starworks Motorsport | (Mexico) Martin Fuentes (Australia) John Martin (United States) Adam Merzon | Oreca FLM09 | C | 385 |
| 18 | PC | 5 | 7 | (United States) Starworks Motorsport | (Mexico) Martin Fuentes (Australia) John Martin (United States) Adam Merzon | Chevrolet 6.2 L V8 | C | 385 |
| 19 | PC | 6 | 85 | (United States) JDC-Miller MotorSports | (United States) Chris Miller (South Africa) Stephen Simpson (Canada) Mikhail Goikhberg | Oreca FLM09 | C | 384 |
| 19 | PC | 6 | 85 | (United States) JDC-Miller MotorSports | (United States) Chris Miller (South Africa) Stephen Simpson (Canada) Mikhail Goikhberg | Chevrolet 6.2 L V8 | C | 384 |
| 20 | PC | 7 | 25 | (United States) 8Star Motorsports | (United States) Sean Rayhall (United Kingdom) Tom Kimber-Smith (United States) Eric Lux | Oreca FLM09 | C | 383 |
| 20 | PC | 7 | 25 | (United States) 8Star Motorsports | (United States) Sean Rayhall (United Kingdom) Tom Kimber-Smith (United States) Eric Lux | Chevrolet 6.2 L V8 | C | 383 |
| 21 | GTLM | 9 | 57 | (United States) Krohn Racing | (United States) Tracy Krohn (Sweden) Niclas Jönsson (Italy) Andrea Bertolini | Ferrari 458 Italia GT2 | M | 383 |
| 21 | GTLM | 9 | 57 | (United States) Krohn Racing | (United States) Tracy Krohn (Sweden) Niclas Jönsson (Italy) Andrea Bertolini | Ferrari 4.5 L V8 | M | 383 |
| 22 | P | 6 | 60 | (United States) Michael Shank Racing with Curb/Agajanian | (United States) John Pew (Brazil) Oswaldo Negri Jr. | Riley MkXXVI | C | 383 |
| 22 | P | 6 | 60 | (United States) Michael Shank Racing with Curb/Agajanian | (United States) John Pew (Brazil) Oswaldo Negri Jr. | Ford EcoBoost 3.5 L Turbo V6 | C | 383 |
| 23 | P | 7 | 90 | (United States) Spirit of Daytona Racing | (Canada) Michael Valiante (United Kingdom) Richard Westbrook (Germany) Mike Rockenfeller | Coyote Corvette DP | C | 381 |
| 23 | P | 7 | 90 | (United States) Spirit of Daytona Racing | (Canada) Michael Valiante (United Kingdom) Richard Westbrook (Germany) Mike Rockenfeller | Chevrolet LS9 5.5 L V8 | C | 381 |
| 24 | **GTD** | **1** | **48** | **(United States) Paul Miller Racing** | **(United States) Bryce Miller (United Kingdom) Matthew Bell (Germany) Christopher Haase** | **Audi R8 LMS** | C | **376** |
| 24 | **GTD** | **1** | **48** | **(United States) Paul Miller Racing** | **(United States) Bryce Miller (United Kingdom) Matthew Bell (Germany) Christopher Haase** | **Audi 5.2 L V10** | C | **376** |
| 25 | GTD | 2 | 58 | (United States) Snow Racing | (Belgium) Jan Heylen (United States) Madison Snow (United States) Patrick Dempsey | Porsche 911 GT America | C | 376 |
| 25 | GTD | 2 | 58 | (United States) Snow Racing | (Belgium) Jan Heylen (United States) Madison Snow (United States) Patrick Dempsey | Porsche 4.0 L Flat-6 | C | 376 |
| 26 | GTD | 3 | 44 | (United States) Magnus Racing | (United States) Andy Lally (United States) John Potter (Germany) Marco Seefried | Porsche 911 GT America | C | 376 |
| 26 | GTD | 3 | 44 | (United States) Magnus Racing | (United States) Andy Lally (United States) John Potter (Germany) Marco Seefried | Porsche 4.0 L Flat-6 | C | 376 |
| 27 | GTD | 4 | 94 | (United States) Turner Motorsport | (United States) Dane Cameron (Finland) Markus Palttala (Denmark) Christoffer Nygaard | BMW Z4 GT3 | C | 376 |
| 27 | GTD | 4 | 94 | (United States) Turner Motorsport | (United States) Dane Cameron (Finland) Markus Palttala (Denmark) Christoffer Nygaard | BMW 4.4 L V8 | C | 376 |
| 28 | GTD | 5 | 23 | (United States) Team Seattle/Alex Job Racing | (United States) Ian James (Germany) Mario Farnbacher (Spain) Alex Riberas | Porsche 911 GT America | C | 375 |
| 28 | GTD | 5 | 23 | (United States) Team Seattle/Alex Job Racing | (United States) Ian James (Germany) Mario Farnbacher (Spain) Alex Riberas | Porsche 4.0 L Flat-6 | C | 375 |
| 29 | GTD | 6 | 51 | (Italy) Spirit of Race | (Thailand) Pasin Lathouras (Republic of Ireland) Matt Griffin (Italy) Michele Rugolo | Ferrari 458 Italia GT3 | C | 375 |
| 29 | GTD | 6 | 51 | (Italy) Spirit of Race | (Thailand) Pasin Lathouras (Republic of Ireland) Matt Griffin (Italy) Michele Rugolo | Ferrari 4.5 L V8 | C | 375 |
| 30 | PC | 8 | 87 | (United States) BAR1 Motorsports | (United Kingdom) Martin Plowman (United States) Marc Drumwright (United States) Tomy Drissi | Oreca FLM09 | C | 375 |
| 30 | PC | 8 | 87 | (United States) BAR1 Motorsports | (United Kingdom) Martin Plowman (United States) Marc Drumwright (United States) Tomy Drissi | Chevrolet 6.2 L V8 | C | 375 |
| 31 | GTD | 7 | 555 | (Canada) AIM Autosport | (United States) Bill Sweedler (United States) Townsend Bell (United States) Conrad Grunewald | Ferrari 458 Italia GT3 | C | 375 |
| 31 | GTD | 7 | 555 | (Canada) AIM Autosport | (United States) Bill Sweedler (United States) Townsend Bell (United States) Conrad Grunewald | Ferrari 4.5 L V8 | C | 375 |
| 32 | GTD | 8 | 22 | (United States) Alex Job Racing | (United States) Cooper MacNeil (United States) Leh Keen (United States) Craig Stanton | Porsche 911 GT America | C | 375 |
| 32 | GTD | 8 | 22 | (United States) Alex Job Racing | (United States) Cooper MacNeil (United States) Leh Keen (United States) Craig Stanton | Porsche 4.0 L Flat-6 | C | 375 |
| 33 | GTD | 9 | 63 | (United States) Scuderia Corsa | (United States) Jeff Westphal (Italy) Alessandro Balzan (United States) Brandon Davis | Ferrari 458 Italia GT3 | C | 373 |
| 33 | GTD | 9 | 63 | (United States) Scuderia Corsa | (United States) Jeff Westphal (Italy) Alessandro Balzan (United States) Brandon Davis | Ferrari 4.5 L V8 | C | 373 |
| 34 | GTD | 10 | 007 | (United States) TRG-AMR | (Australia) James Davison (Denmark) Christina Nielsen (United States) David Block | Aston Martin V12 Vantage GT3 | C | 373 |
| 34 | GTD | 10 | 007 | (United States) TRG-AMR | (Australia) James Davison (Denmark) Christina Nielsen (United States) David Block | Aston Martin 6.0 L V12 | C | 373 |
| 35 | GTD | 11 | 81 | (United States) GB Autosport | (United Kingdom) Ben Barker (Republic of Ireland) Damien Faulkner (Austria) Philipp Eng | Porsche 911 GT America | C | 367 |
| 35 | GTD | 11 | 81 | (United States) GB Autosport | (United Kingdom) Ben Barker (Republic of Ireland) Damien Faulkner (Austria) Philipp Eng | Porsche 4.0 L Flat-6 | C | 367 |
| 36 | GTD | 12 | 35 | (United States) Flying Lizard Motorsports | (United States) Seth Neiman (South Africa) Dion von Moltke (United Kingdom) Alessandro Latif | Audi R8 LMS | C | 366 |
| 36 | GTD | 12 | 35 | (United States) Flying Lizard Motorsports | (United States) Seth Neiman (South Africa) Dion von Moltke (United Kingdom) Alessandro Latif | Audi 5.2 L V10 | C | 366 |
| 37 | GTD | 13 | 71 | (United States) Park Place Motorsports | (France) Kévin Estre (United States) Patrick Lindsey (Austria) Norbert Siedler | Porsche 911 GT America | C | 346 |
| 37 | GTD | 13 | 71 | (United States) Park Place Motorsports | (France) Kévin Estre (United States) Patrick Lindsey (Austria) Norbert Siedler | Porsche 4.0 L Flat-6 | C | 346 |
| 38 DNF | PC | 9 | 09 | (United States) RSR Racing | (United States) Duncan Ende (Brazil) Bruno Junqueira (Denmark) David Heinemeier Hansson | Oreca FLM09 | C | 283 |
| 38 DNF | PC | 9 | 09 | (United States) RSR Racing | (United States) Duncan Ende (Brazil) Bruno Junqueira (Denmark) David Heinemeier Hansson | Chevrolet 6.2 L V8 | C | 283 |
| 39 | GTD | 14 | 45 | (United States) Flying Lizard Motorsports | (Venezuela) Nelson Canache Jr. (United States) Spencer Pumpelly (United States) Andrew Palmer | Audi R8 LMS | C | 266 |
| 39 | GTD | 14 | 45 | (United States) Flying Lizard Motorsports | (Venezuela) Nelson Canache Jr. (United States) Spencer Pumpelly (United States) Andrew Palmer | Audi 5.2 L V10 | C | 266 |
| 40 DNF | P | 8 | 70 | (United States) SpeedSource | (Canada) Sylvain Tremblay (United States) Tom Long (United Kingdom) Ben Devlin | Mazda Prototype | C | 255 |
| 40 DNF | P | 8 | 70 | (United States) SpeedSource | (Canada) Sylvain Tremblay (United States) Tom Long (United Kingdom) Ben Devlin | Mazda Skyactiv-D 2.2 L Turbo I4 (Diesel) | C | 255 |
| 41 | GTD | 15 | 19 | (United States) Mühlner Motorsports America | (United States) Mark Kvamme (United Kingdom) Daniel Lloyd (United States) Larry Pegram | Porsche 911 GT America | C | 255 |
| 41 | GTD | 15 | 19 | (United States) Mühlner Motorsports America | (United States) Mark Kvamme (United Kingdom) Daniel Lloyd (United States) Larry Pegram | Porsche 4.0 L Flat-6 | C | 255 |
| 42 DNF | P | 9 | 42 | (France) OAK Racing | (Colombia) Gustavo Yacamán (United Kingdom) Alex Brundle (China) Ho-Pin Tung | Ligier JS P2 | C | 187 |
| 42 DNF | P | 9 | 42 | (France) OAK Racing | (Colombia) Gustavo Yacamán (United Kingdom) Alex Brundle (China) Ho-Pin Tung | Honda HR28TT 2.8 L Turbo V6 | C | 187 |
| 43 DNF | GTD | 16 | 49 | (Italy) Spirit of Race | (Italy) Piergiuseppe Perazzini (Italy) Marco Cioci (United States) Eddie Cheever III | Ferrari 458 Italia GT3 | C | 181 |
| 43 DNF | GTD | 16 | 49 | (Italy) Spirit of Race | (Italy) Piergiuseppe Perazzini (Italy) Marco Cioci (United States) Eddie Cheever III | Ferrari 4.5 L V8 | C | 181 |
| 44 DNF | PC | 10 | 38 | (United States) Performance Tech Motorsports | (Canada) David Ostella (United States) James French (United States) Jerome Mee | Oreca FLM09 | C | 171 |
| 44 DNF | PC | 10 | 38 | (United States) Performance Tech Motorsports | (Canada) David Ostella (United States) James French (United States) Jerome Mee | Chevrolet 6.2 L V8 | C | 171 |
| 45 DNF | GTD | 17 | 33 | (United States) Riley Motorsports | (Netherlands) Jeroen Bleekemolen (Netherlands) Sebastiaan Bleekemolen (United States) Ben Keating | SRT Viper GT3-R | C | 166 |
| 45 DNF | GTD | 17 | 33 | (United States) Riley Motorsports | (Netherlands) Jeroen Bleekemolen (Netherlands) Sebastiaan Bleekemolen (United States) Ben Keating | SRT 8.0 L V10 | C | 166 |
| 46 DNF | P | 10 | 9 | (United States) Action Express Racing | (United States) Brian Frisselle (United States) Burt Frisselle (United States) Jon Fogarty | Coyote Corvette DP | C | 134 |
| 46 DNF | P | 10 | 9 | (United States) Action Express Racing | (United States) Brian Frisselle (United States) Burt Frisselle (United States) Jon Fogarty | Chevrolet LS9 5.5 L V8 | C | 134 |
| 47 DNF | PC | 11 | 88 | (United States) BAR1 Motorsports | (United States) Tom Papadopoulos (United Kingdom) Johnny Mowlem (United States) David Cheng | Oreca FLM09 | C | 108 |
| 47 DNF | PC | 11 | 88 | (United States) BAR1 Motorsports | (United States) Tom Papadopoulos (United Kingdom) Johnny Mowlem (United States) David Cheng | Chevrolet 6.2 L V8 | C | 108 |
| 48 DNF | GTLM | 10 | 55 | (United States) BMW Team RLL | (United States) Bill Auberlen (United States) Joey Hand (United Kingdom) Andy Priaulx | BMW Z4 GTE | M | 99 |
| 48 DNF | GTLM | 10 | 55 | (United States) BMW Team RLL | (United States) Bill Auberlen (United States) Joey Hand (United Kingdom) Andy Priaulx | BMW 4.4 L V8 | M | 99 |
| 49 DNF | GTD | 18 | 27 | (United States) Dempsey Racing | (United States) Patrick Dempsey (United States) Joe Foster (United States) Andrew Davis | Porsche 911 GT America | C | 99 |
| 49 DNF | GTD | 18 | 27 | (United States) Dempsey Racing | (United States) Patrick Dempsey (United States) Joe Foster (United States) Andrew Davis | Porsche 4.0 L Flat-6 | C | 99 |
| 50 DNF | GTLM | 11 | 62 | (United States) Risi Competizione | (Italy) Giancarlo Fisichella (Germany) Pierre Kaffer (Monaco) Olivier Beretta | Ferrari 458 Italia GT2 | M | 95 |
| 50 DNF | GTLM | 11 | 62 | (United States) Risi Competizione | (Italy) Giancarlo Fisichella (Germany) Pierre Kaffer (Monaco) Olivier Beretta | Ferrari 4.5 L V8 | M | 95 |
| 51 DNF | P | 11 | 07 | (United States) SpeedSource | (United States) Tristan Nunez (United States) Joel Miller (France) Tristan Vautier | Mazda Prototype | C | 47 |
| 51 DNF | P | 11 | 07 | (United States) SpeedSource | (United States) Tristan Nunez (United States) Joel Miller (France) Tristan Vautier | Mazda Skyactiv-D 2.2 L Turbo I4 (Diesel) | C | 47 |

Tyre manufacturers
Key
| Symbol | Tyre manufacturer |
|---|---|
| **C** | Continental |
| **M** | Michelin |
| **F** | Falken Tire |

=== Race Statistics ===
United SportsCar Championship
| Previous race: Lone Star Le Mans | 2014 season | Next race: None |
