= 2017 Advance Auto Parts Sportscar Showdown =

Fourth round of the 2017 IMSA SportsCar Championship season

Map of the Circuit of the Americas - Grand Prix Circuit

The 2017 Advance Auto Parts Sportscar Showdown was a sports car race sanctioned by the International Motor Sports Association (IMSA). The race was held at Circuit of the Americas in Austin, Texas on May 6, 2017. The race was the fourth round of the 2017 IMSA SportsCar Championship.

== Background ==
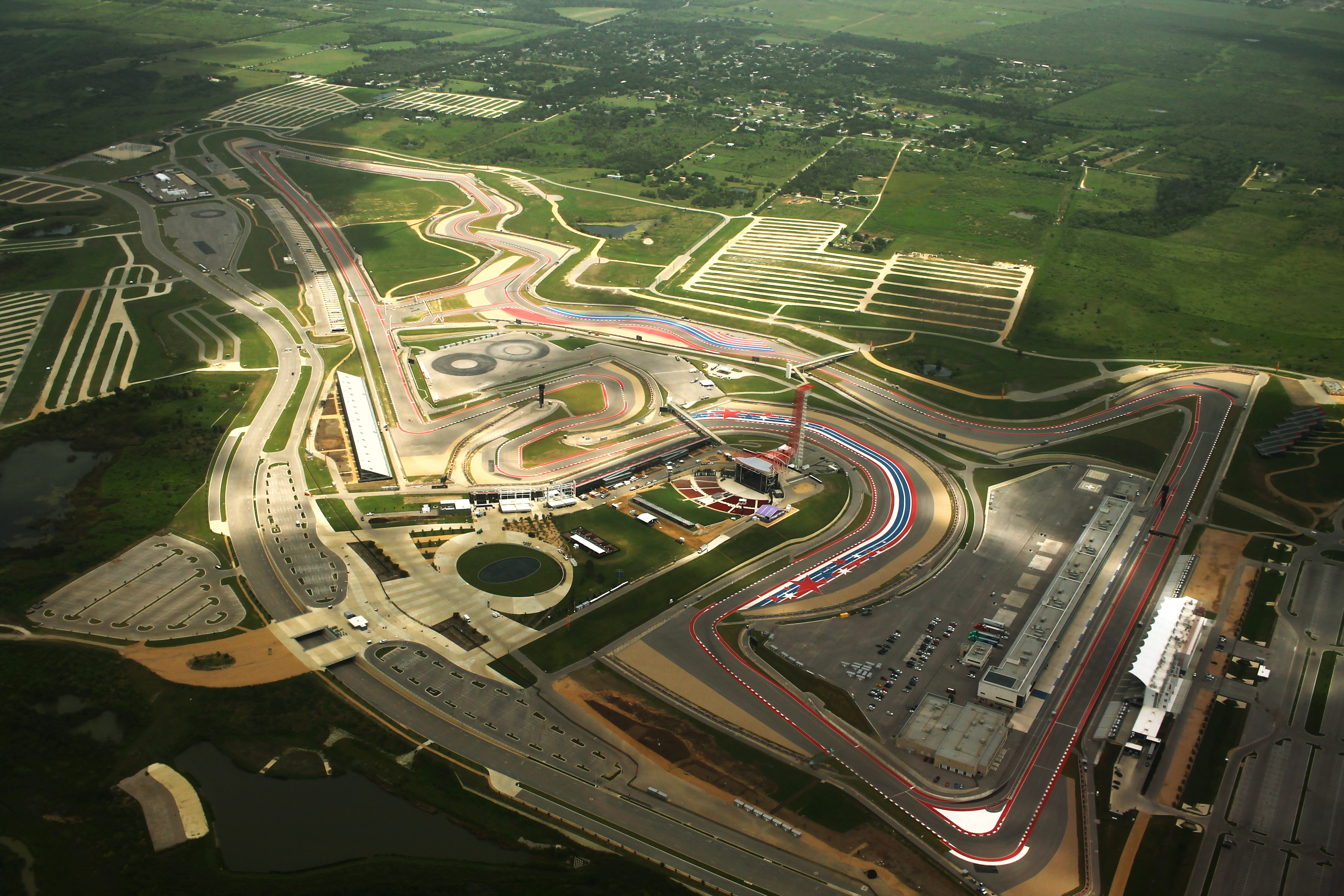
Circuit of the Americas (pictured in 2015), where the race was held.

IMSA's president Scott Atherton confirmed the Advance Auto Parts Sportscar Showdown was part of the series' schedule for the 2017 IMSA SportsCar Championship at Road America's victory lane in August 2016. It was the fourth consecutive year the event was held as part of the WeatherTech SportsCar Championship. The 2017 Advance Auto Parts Sportscar Showdown was the fourth of twelve scheduled sports car races of 2017 by IMSA, and was the second round not held on the held as part of the North American Endurance Cup. The race was held at the twenty-turn 3.426 mi (5.514 km) Circuit of the Americas in Austin, Texas on May 6, 2017. Unlike in previous years where the race was run alongside the FIA World Endurance Championship event as a double-header, the 2017 edition was a standalone event.

After the BUBBA Burger Sports Car Grand Prix four weeks earlier, Jordan Taylor and Ricky Taylor led the Prototype Drivers' Championship with 105 points, ahead of João Barbosa and Christian Fittipaldi with 89 points, and Misha Goikhberg and Stephen Simpson with 82 points. With 72 points, the PC Drivers' Championship was led by James French, Patricio O'Ward, and Kyle Masson with a twelve-point advantage over Sean Rayhall. Joey Hand and Dirk Müller led the GTLM Drivers' Championship with 91 points, ahead of Antonio García and Jan Magnussen with 89 points. In GTD, the Drivers' Championship was led by Ben Keating and Jeroen Bleekemolen with 98 points, ahead of Alessandro Balzan and Christina Nielsen with 77 points. Cadillac, Ford, and Mercedes-AMG were leading their respective Manufacturers' Championships, while Wayne Taylor Racing, Performance Tech Motorsports, Ford Chip Ganassi Racing, and Riley Motorsports Team AMG each led their own Teams' Championships.

== Entries ==
A total of 39 cars took part in the event split across 4 classes. 10 cars were entered in P, 3 in PC, 9 in GTLM, and 16 in GTD. In P, Marco Bonanomi replaced Tom Kimber-Smith in the PR1/Mathiasen Motorsports entry while José Gutiérrez returned after missing the previous race at Long Beach. In PC, Starworks Motorsport skipped the event. Nicholas Boulle joined Stefan Wilson in the #26 BAR1 Motorsports entry. In GTLM, Wolf Henzler replaced Kévin Estre in the #912 Porsche GT Team, due to a clash with the FIA World Endurance Championship round at Circuit de Spa-Francorchamps. In GTD, Lone Star Racing made their first appearance of the season. Parker Chase and Harry Gottsacker replaced Wolf Henzler and Jan Heylen in the #991 TRG entry. Kenny Habul returned to the #75 SunEnergy1 Racing entry. Mathieu Jaminet subbed for Michael Christensen in the #28 Alegra Motorsports due to a clash with the FIA World Endurance Championship round at Circuit de Spa-Francorchamps.

== Practice ==
There were three practice sessions preceding the start of the race on Saturday, two on Thursday and one on Friday. The first two one-hour sessions were on Thursday morning and afternoon. The third on Friday morning lasted an hour.

=== Practice 1 ===
The first practice session took place at 9:45 am CT on Thursday and ended with Ricky Taylor topping the charts for Wayne Taylor Racing, with a lap time of 1:57.116. The PC class was topped by the #38 Performance Tech Motorsports Oreca FLM09 of Patricio O'Ward with a time of 2:00.522. Dirk Müller was fastest in GTLM and Tristan Vautier set the fastest time GTD.

Pos.	Class	No.	Team	Driver	Time	Gap
1	P	10	Wayne Taylor Racing	Ricky Taylor	1:57.116	_
2	P	5	Mustang Sampling Racing	João Barbosa	1:57.193	+0.077
3	P	2	Tequila Patrón ESM	Ryan Dalziel	1:57.300	+0.184

=== Practice 2 ===
The second practice session took place at 2:55 pm CT on Thursday and ended with Jordan Taylor topping the charts for Wayne Taylor Racing, with a lap time of 1:56.595. James French set the fastest time in PC. The GTLM class was topped by the #25 BMW Team RLL BMW M6 GTLM of Alexander Sims with a time of 2:03.703. John Edwards was second in the sister #24 car and Laurens Vanthoor rounded out the top 3. Tristan Vautier was fastest in GTD.

Pos.	Class	No.	Team	Driver	Time	Gap
1	P	10	Wayne Taylor Racing	Jordan Taylor	1:56.595	_
2	P	5	Mustang Sampling Racing	Christian Fittipaldi	1:57.722	+1.127
3	P	85	JDC-Miller MotorSports	Stephen Simpson	1:57.978	+1.383

=== Practice 3 ===
The third and final practice session took place at 8:55 am CT on Friday and ended with Dane Cameron topping the charts for Whelen Engineering Racing, with a lap time of 1:56.117. Patricio O'Ward set the fastest time PC by 3.382 seconds ahead of Don Yount in the #20 BAR1 Motorsports entry. The GTLM class was topped by the #62 Risi Competizione Ferrari 488 GTE of Giancarlo Fisichella with a time of 2:02.915. Mathieu Jaminet was fastest in GTD.

Pos.	Class	No.	Team	Driver	Time	Gap
1	P	31	Whelen Engineering Racing	Dane Cameron	1:56.117	_
2	P	5	Mustang Sampling Racing	João Barbosa	1:56.332	+0.215
3	P	85	JDC-Miller MotorSports	Stephen Simpson	1:56.393	+0.276

== Qualifying ==
In Friday afternoon's 90-minute four-group qualifying, each category had separate 15-minute sessions. Regulations stipulated that teams nominate one qualifying driver, with the fastest laps determining each class' starting order. IMSA arranged the grid to put Prototypes ahead of the PC, GTLM and GTD cars.

Qualifying was broken into four sessions. The first was for cars in GTD class. Mathieu Jaminet qualified on pole for the class driving the #28 Alegra Motorsports, besting Jack Hawksworth in the #15 3GT Racing entry.

The second session of qualifying was for cars in the GTLM class. John Edwards qualified on pole driving the #24 BMW Team RLL entry, beating Giancarlo Fisichella in the #62 Risi Competizione entry by less than one tenth of a second.

The third session of qualifying was for cars in the PC class. James French set the fastest time driving the #38 Performance Tech Motorsports entry.

The final session of qualifying was for the P class. Ricky Taylor qualified on pole by nearly 1.6 seconds clear of Johannes van Overbeek.

=== Qualifying results ===
Pole positions in each class are indicated in bold and by ‡.

Pos.	Class	No.	Team	Driver	Time	Gap	Grid
1	**P**	**10**	**(United States) Wayne Taylor Racing**	**(United States) Ricky Taylor**	**1:54.809**	**_**	1‡
2	P	22	(United States) Tequila Patrón ESM	(United States) Johannes van Overbeek	1:56.401	+1.592	2
3	P	31	(United States) Whelen Engineering Racing	(United States) Eric Curran	1:56.429	+1.620	3
4	P	5	(United States) Mustang Sampling Racing	(Brazil) Christian Fittipaldi	1:56.655	+1.846	4
5	P	52	(United States) PR1/Mathiasen Motorsports	(Mexico) José Gutiérrez	1:56.884	+2.075	5
6	P	2	(United States) Tequila Patrón ESM	(United States) Scott Sharp	1:56.988	+2.179	6
7	P	55	(Japan) Mazda Motorsports	(United States) Jonathan Bomarito	1:57.199	+2.390	7
8	P	90	(United States) VisitFlorida Racing	(Belgium) Marc Goossens	1:57.460	+2.651	8
9	P	85	(United States) JDC-Miller MotorSports	(Canada) Mikhail Goikhberg	1:57.726	+2.917	9
10	P	70	(Japan) Mazda Motorsports	(United States) Tom Long	1:57.929	+3.120	10
11	**PC**	**38**	**(United States) Performance Tech Motorsports**	**(United States) James French**	**2:00.066**	**+5.257**	11‡
12	**GTLM**	**24**	**(United States) BMW Team RLL**	**(United States) John Edwards**	**2:02.833**	**+8.024**	14‡
13	GTLM	62	(United States) Risi Competizione	(Italy) Giancarlo Fisichella	2:02.865	+8.056	15
14	GTLM	25	(United States) BMW Team RLL	(United Kingdom) Alexander Sims	2:02.990	+8.181	16
15	GTLM	67	(United States) Ford Chip Ganassi Racing	(Australia) Ryan Briscoe	2:03.014	+8.205	17
16	GTLM	66	(United States) Ford Chip Ganassi Racing	(Germany) Dirk Müller	2:03.023	+8.214	18
17	PC	26	(United States) BAR1 Motorsports	(United Kingdom) Stefan Wilson	2:03.026	+8.217	12
18	GTLM	3	(United States) Corvette Racing	(Denmark) Jan Magnussen	2:03.030	+8.221	19
19	GTLM	911	(United States) Porsche GT Team	(France) Patrick Pilet	2:03.085	+8.276	20
20	GTLM	4	(United States) Corvette Racing	(United States) Tommy Milner	2:03.594	+8.785	21
21	GTLM	912	(United States) Porsche GT Team	(Germany) Wolf Henzler	2:03.759	+8.950	22
22	PC	20	(United States) BAR1 Motorsports	(United States) Don Yount	2:04.264	+9.455	13
23	**GTD**	**28**	**(United States) Alegra Motorsports**	**(France) Mathieu Jaminet**	**2:06.264**	**+11.722**	23‡
24	GTD	15	(United States) 3GT Racing	(United Kingdom) Jack Hawksworth	2:06.623	+11.814	39^{1}
25	GTD	48	(United States) Paul Miller Racing	(United States) Madison Snow	2:07.724	+12.915	24
26	GTD	16	(United States) Change Racing	(United States) Corey Lewis	2:07.757	+12.948	25
27	GTD	73	(United States) Park Place Motorsports	(United States) Patrick Lindsey	2:07.778	+12.969	26
28	GTD	57	(United States) Stevenson Motorsports	(United States) Andrew Davis	2:07.882	+13.073	27
29	GTD	14	(United States) 3GT Racing	(United States) Scott Pruett	2:07.959	+13.150	28
30	GTD	33	(United States) Riley Motorsports – Team AMG	(United States) Ben Keating	2:08.033	+13.224	29
31	GTD	93	(United States) Michael Shank Racing with Curb-Agajanian	(United Kingdom) Katherine Legge	2:08.089	+13.280	30
32	GTD	63	(United States) Scuderia Corsa	(Denmark) Christina Nielsen	2:08.210	+13.280	31
33	GTD	75	(Australia) SunEnergy1 Racing	(Australia) Kenny Habul	2:08.515	+13.706	32
34	GTD	50	(United States) Riley Motorsports – WeatherTech Racing	(United States) Cooper MacNeil	2:08.697	+13.888	33
35	GTD	86	(United States) Michael Shank Racing with Curb-Agajanian	(Brazil) Oswaldo Negri Jr.	2:08.761	+13.952	34
36	GTD	96	(United States) Turner Motorsport	(United States) Bret Curtis	2:09.039	+14.230	35
37	GTD	991	(United States) TRG	(United States) Parker Chase	2:09.295	+14.486	36
38	GTD	80	(United States) Lone Star Racing	(United States) Dan Knox	2:09.500	+14.691	38^{2}
39	GTD	54	(United States) CORE Autosport	(United States) Jon Bennett	2:10.221	+15.412	37
Sources:

- ^{1} The No. 15 3GT Racing entry was moved to the back of the GTD after failing post qualifying technical inspection.
- ^{2} The No. 80 Lone Star Racing entry was moved to the back of the GTD as per Article 43.6 of the Sporting regulations (Change of starting tires).

== Race ==
=== Post-race ===
With a total of 141 points, Jordan Taylor and Ricky Taylor's victory allowed them to increase their advantage over Fittipaldi and Barbosa in the Prototype Drivers' Championship to 22 points. In PC, Yount and Rice advanced from fourth to second. With 124 points, García and Magnussen's victory allowed them to take the lead of the GTLM Drivers' Championship. With a total of 133 points, Bleekemolen and Keating's victory allowed them to increase their advantage over Balzan and Nielsen to 24 points. Cadillac and Mercedes-AMG continued to top their respective Manufacturers' Championships while Chevrolet took the lead of the GTLM Manufactures' Championship. Wayne Taylor Racing, Performance Tech Motorsports, and Riley Motorsports kept their respective advantages in their respective of Teams' Championships while Corvette Racing took the lead of the GTLM Teams' Championship with eight races left in the season.

=== Results ===
Class winners are denoted in bold and ‡.

Final race classification
Pos	Class	No.	Team	Drivers	Chassis	Tire	Laps	Time/Retired
Pos	Class	No.	Team	Drivers	Engine	Tire	Laps	Time/Retired
1	**P**	**10**	**(United States) Wayne Taylor Racing**	**(United States) Ricky Taylor (United States) Jordan Taylor**	**Cadillac DPi-V.R**	C	**73**	**2:41:14.508‡**
1	**P**	**10**	**(United States) Wayne Taylor Racing**	**(United States) Ricky Taylor (United States) Jordan Taylor**	**Cadillac 6.2 L V8**	C	**73**	**2:41:14.508‡**
2	P	31	(United States) Whelen Engineering Racing	(United States) Dane Cameron (United States) Eric Curran	Cadillac DPi-V.R	C	73	+18.555
2	P	31	(United States) Whelen Engineering Racing	(United States) Dane Cameron (United States) Eric Curran	Cadillac 6.2 L V8	C	73	+18.555
3	P	5	(United States) Mustang Sampling Racing	(Portugal) João Barbosa (Brazil) Christian Fittipaldi	Cadillac DPi-V.R	C	73	+19.818
3	P	5	(United States) Mustang Sampling Racing	(Portugal) João Barbosa (Brazil) Christian Fittipaldi	Cadillac 6.2 L V8	C	73	+19.818
4	P	85	(United States) JDC-Miller MotorSports	(Canada) Mikhail Goikhberg (South Africa) Stephen Simpson	Oreca 07	C	73	+27.239
4	P	85	(United States) JDC-Miller MotorSports	(Canada) Mikhail Goikhberg (South Africa) Stephen Simpson	Gibson GK428 4.2 L V8	C	73	+27.239
5	P	22	(United States) Tequila Patrón ESM	(United States) Johannes van Overbeek (United States) Ed Brown	Nissan Onroak DPi	C	72	+1 lap
5	P	22	(United States) Tequila Patrón ESM	(United States) Johannes van Overbeek (United States) Ed Brown	Nissan VR38DETT 3.8 L Turbo V6	C	72	+1 lap
6	**PC**	**38**	**(United States) Performance Tech Motorsports**	**(United States) James French** **(Mexico) Patricio O'Ward**	**Oreca FLM09**	C	**72**	**+1 lap**‡
6	**PC**	**38**	**(United States) Performance Tech Motorsports**	**(United States) James French** **(Mexico) Patricio O'Ward**	**Chevrolet 6.2 L V8**	C	**72**	**+1 lap**‡
7	**GTLM**	**3**	**(United States) Corvette Racing**	**(Denmark) Jan Magnussen (Spain) Antonio García**	**Chevrolet Corvette C7.R**	M	**71**	**+2 Laps‡**
7	**GTLM**	**3**	**(United States) Corvette Racing**	**(Denmark) Jan Magnussen (Spain) Antonio García**	**Chevrolet LT5.5 5.5 L V8**	M	**71**	**+2 Laps‡**
8	GTLM	25	(United States) BMW Team RLL	(United States) Bill Auberlen (United Kingdom) Alexander Sims	BMW M6 GTLM	M	71	+2 Laps
8	GTLM	25	(United States) BMW Team RLL	(United States) Bill Auberlen (United Kingdom) Alexander Sims	BMW 4.4 L Turbo V8	M	71	+2 Laps
9	PC	26	(United States) BAR1 Motorsports	(United Kingdom) Stefan Wilson (United States) Nicholas Boulle	Oreca FLM09	C	71	+2 Laps
9	PC	26	(United States) BAR1 Motorsports	(United Kingdom) Stefan Wilson (United States) Nicholas Boulle	Chevrolet 6.2 L V8	C	71	+2 Laps
10	GTLM	24	(United States) BMW Team RLL	(United States) John Edwards (Germany) Martin Tomczyk	BMW M6 GTLM	M	71	+2 Laps
10	GTLM	24	(United States) BMW Team RLL	(United States) John Edwards (Germany) Martin Tomczyk	BMW 4.4 L Turbo V8	M	71	+2 Laps
11	GTLM	911	(United States) Porsche GT Team	(France) Patrick Pilet (Germany) Dirk Werner	Porsche 911 RSR	M	71	+2 Laps
11	GTLM	911	(United States) Porsche GT Team	(France) Patrick Pilet (Germany) Dirk Werner	Porsche 4.0 L Flat-6	M	71	+2 Laps
12	GTLM	66	(United States) Ford Chip Ganassi Racing	(Germany) Dirk Müller (United States) Joey Hand	Ford GT	M	70	+3 Laps
12	GTLM	66	(United States) Ford Chip Ganassi Racing	(Germany) Dirk Müller (United States) Joey Hand	Ford EcoBoost 3.5 L Twin-turbo V6	M	70	+3 Laps
13	**GTD**	**33**	**(United States) Riley Motorsports – Team AMG**	**(Netherlands) Jeroen Bleekemolen (United States) Ben Keating**	**Mercedes-AMG GT3**	C	**69**	**+4 Laps**‡
13	**GTD**	**33**	**(United States) Riley Motorsports – Team AMG**	**(Netherlands) Jeroen Bleekemolen (United States) Ben Keating**	**Mercedes AMG M159 6.2 L V8**	C	**69**	**+4 Laps**‡
14	GTD	63	(United States) Scuderia Corsa	(Denmark) Christina Nielsen (Italy) Alessandro Balzan	Ferrari 488 GT3	C	69	+4 Laps
14	GTD	63	(United States) Scuderia Corsa	(Denmark) Christina Nielsen (Italy) Alessandro Balzan	Ferrari F154CB 3.9 L Turbo V8	C	69	+4 Laps
15	GTD	75	(United States) SunEnergy1 Racing	(France) Tristan Vautier (Australia) Kenny Habul	Mercedes-AMG GT3	C	69	+4 Laps
15	GTD	75	(United States) SunEnergy1 Racing	(France) Tristan Vautier (Australia) Kenny Habul	Mercedes AMG M159 6.2 L V8	C	69	+4 Laps
16	GTD	48	(United States) Paul Miller Racing	(United States) Bryan Sellers (United States) Madison Snow	Lamborghini Huracán GT3	C	69	+4 Laps
16	GTD	48	(United States) Paul Miller Racing	(United States) Bryan Sellers (United States) Madison Snow	Lamborghini 5.2 L V10	C	69	+4 Laps
17	GTD	96	(United States) Turner Motorsport	(Germany) Jens Klingmann (United States) Bret Curtis	BMW M6 GT3	C	69	+4 Laps
17	GTD	96	(United States) Turner Motorsport	(Germany) Jens Klingmann (United States) Bret Curtis	BMW 4.4L Turbo V8	C	69	+4 Laps
18	GTD	50	(United States) Riley Motorsports – WeatherTech Racing	(United States) Cooper MacNeil (United States) Gunnar Jeannette	Mercedes-AMG GT3	C	69	+4 Laps
18	GTD	50	(United States) Riley Motorsports – WeatherTech Racing	(United States) Cooper MacNeil (United States) Gunnar Jeannette	Mercedes AMG M159 6.2 L V8	C	69	+4 Laps
19	GTD	28	(United States) Alegra Motorsports	(France) Mathieu Jaminet (Canada) Daniel Morad	Porsche 911 GT3 R	C	69	+4 Laps
19	GTD	28	(United States) Alegra Motorsports	(France) Mathieu Jaminet (Canada) Daniel Morad	Porsche 4.0 L Flat-6	C	69	+4 Laps
20	GTD	73	(United States) Park Place Motorsports	(Germany) Jörg Bergmeister (United States) Patrick Lindsey	Porsche 911 GT3 R	C	69	+4 Laps
20	GTD	73	(United States) Park Place Motorsports	(Germany) Jörg Bergmeister (United States) Patrick Lindsey	Porsche 4.0 L Flat-6	C	69	+4 Laps
21	GTD	14	(United States) 3GT Racing	(United States) Scott Pruett (United States) Sage Karam	Lexus RC F GT3	C	69	+4 Laps
21	GTD	14	(United States) 3GT Racing	(United States) Scott Pruett (United States) Sage Karam	Lexus 5.0L V8	C	69	+4 Laps
22	GTD	57	(United States) Stevenson Motorsports	(United States) Andrew Davis (United States) Lawson Aschenbach	Audi R8 LMS	C	69	+4 Laps
22	GTD	57	(United States) Stevenson Motorsports	(United States) Andrew Davis (United States) Lawson Aschenbach	Audi 5.2L V10	C	69	+4 Laps
23	GTD	86	(United States) Michael Shank Racing with Curb Agajanian	(United States) Jeff Segal (Brazil) Oswaldo Negri Jr.	Acura NSX GT3	C	69	+4 Laps
23	GTD	86	(United States) Michael Shank Racing with Curb Agajanian	(United States) Jeff Segal (Brazil) Oswaldo Negri Jr.	Acura 3.5 L Turbo V6	C	69	+4 Laps
24	GTD	80	(United States) Lone Star Racing	(United States) Dan Knox (United States) Mike Skeen	Mercedes-AMG GT3	C	69	+4 Laps
24	GTD	80	(United States) Lone Star Racing	(United States) Dan Knox (United States) Mike Skeen	Mercedes-AMG M159 6.2 L V8	C	69	+4 Laps
25	GTD	15	(United States) 3GT Racing	(United States) Robert Alon (United Kingdom) Jack Hawksworth	Lexus RC F GT3	C	69	+4 Laps
25	GTD	15	(United States) 3GT Racing	(United States) Robert Alon (United Kingdom) Jack Hawksworth	Lexus 5.0L V8	C	69	+4 Laps
26	GTD	54	(United States) CORE Autosport	(United States) Jon Bennett (United States) Colin Braun	Porsche 911 GT3 R	C	69	+4 Laps
26	GTD	54	(United States) CORE Autosport	(United States) Jon Bennett (United States) Colin Braun	Porsche 4.0 L Flat-6	C	69	+4 Laps
27	GTD	93	(United States) Michael Shank Racing with Curb Agajanian	(United States) Andy Lally (United Kingdom) Katherine Legge	Acura NSX GT3	C	69	+4 Laps
27	GTD	93	(United States) Michael Shank Racing with Curb Agajanian	(United States) Andy Lally (United Kingdom) Katherine Legge	Acura 3.5 L Turbo V6	C	69	+4 Laps
28	P	2	(United States) Tequila Patrón ESM	(United States) Scott Sharp (United Kingdom) Ryan Dalziel	Nissan Onroak DPi	C	68	Fire
28	P	2	(United States) Tequila Patrón ESM	(United States) Scott Sharp (United Kingdom) Ryan Dalziel	Nissan VR38DETT 3.8 L Turbo V6	C	68	Fire
29	GTD	991	(United States) TRG	(United States) Parker Chase (United States) Harry Gottsacker	Porsche 911 GT3 R	C	68	+5 Laps
29	GTD	991	(United States) TRG	(United States) Parker Chase (United States) Harry Gottsacker	Porsche 4.0 L Flat-6	C	68	+5 Laps
30 DNF	P	90	(United States) VisitFlorida Racing	(Belgium) Marc Goossens (Netherlands) Renger van der Zande	Riley Mk. 30	C	63	Power steering
30 DNF	P	90	(United States) VisitFlorida Racing	(Belgium) Marc Goossens (Netherlands) Renger van der Zande	Gibson GK428 4.2 L V8	C	63	Power steering
31	GTLM	67	(United States) Ford Chip Ganassi Racing	(Australia) Ryan Briscoe (United Kingdom) Richard Westbrook	Ford GT	M	63	+10 Laps
31	GTLM	67	(United States) Ford Chip Ganassi Racing	(Australia) Ryan Briscoe (United Kingdom) Richard Westbrook	Ford EcoBoost 3.5 L Twin-turbo V6	M	63	+10 Laps
32 DNF	PC	20	(United States) BAR1 Motorsports	(United States) Don Yount (United States) Buddy Rice	Oreca FLM09	C	52	Mechanical
32 DNF	PC	20	(United States) BAR1 Motorsports	(United States) Don Yount (United States) Buddy Rice	Chevrolet 6.2 L V8	C	52	Mechanical
33	P	70	(Japan) Mazda Motorsports	(United States) Tom Long (United States) Joel Miller	Mazda RT24-P	C	52	+21 Laps
33	P	70	(Japan) Mazda Motorsports	(United States) Tom Long (United States) Joel Miller	Mazda MZ-2.0T 2.0 L Turbo I4	C	52	+21 Laps
34	P	52	(United States) PR1/Mathiasen Motorsports	(Mexico) José Gutiérrez (Italy) Marco Bonanomi	Ligier JS P217	C	43	+30 Laps
34	P	52	(United States) PR1/Mathiasen Motorsports	(Mexico) José Gutiérrez (Italy) Marco Bonanomi	Gibson GK428 4.2 L V8	C	43	+30 Laps
35	GTLM	4	(United States) Corvette Racing	(United Kingdom) Oliver Gavin (United States) Tommy Milner	Chevrolet Corvette C7.R	M	41	+32 Laps
35	GTLM	4	(United States) Corvette Racing	(United Kingdom) Oliver Gavin (United States) Tommy Milner	Chevrolet LT5.5 5.5 L V8	M	41	+32 Laps
36 DNF	P	55	(Japan) Mazda Motorsports	(United States) Tristan Nunez (United States) Jonathan Bomarito	Mazda RT24-P	C	27	Electrical
36 DNF	P	55	(Japan) Mazda Motorsports	(United States) Tristan Nunez (United States) Jonathan Bomarito	Mazda MZ-2.0T 2.0 L Turbo I4	C	27	Electrical
37 DNF	GTD	16	(United States) Change Racing	(United States) Corey Lewis (Netherlands) Jeroen Mul	Lamborghini Huracán GT3	C	22	Driveshaft
37 DNF	GTD	16	(United States) Change Racing	(United States) Corey Lewis (Netherlands) Jeroen Mul	Lamborghini 5.2 L V10	C	22	Driveshaft
38 DNF	GTLM	912	(United States) Porsche GT Team	(Germany) Wolf Henzler (Belgium) Laurens Vanthoor	Porsche 911 RSR	M	10	Crash damage
38 DNF	GTLM	912	(United States) Porsche GT Team	(Germany) Wolf Henzler (Belgium) Laurens Vanthoor	Porsche 4.0 L Flat-6	M	10	Crash damage
39 DNF	GTLM	62	(United States) Risi Competizione	(Finland) Toni Vilander (Italy) Giancarlo Fisichella	Ferrari 488 GTE	M	1	Crash
39 DNF	GTLM	62	(United States) Risi Competizione	(Finland) Toni Vilander (Italy) Giancarlo Fisichella	Ferrari F154CB 3.9 L Turbo V8	M	1	Crash

Tyre manufacturers
Key
Symbol	Tyre manufacturer
**C**	Continental
**M**	Michelin

== Standings after the race ==
Prototype Drivers' Championship standings
Pos.	+/–	Driver	Points
1		(United States) Jordan Taylor (United States) Ricky Taylor	141
2		(Portugal) João Barbosa (Brazil) Christian Fittipaldi	119
3	2	(United States) Dane Cameron (United States) Eric Curran	111
4	1	(Canada) Misha Goikhberg (South Africa) Stephen Simpson	110
5	1	(United Kingdom) Ryan Dalziel (United States) Scott Sharp	106

PC Drivers' Championship standings
Pos.	+/–	Driver	Points
1		(United States) James French (Mexico) Patricio O'Ward	108
2	2	(United States) Don Yount (United States) Buddy Rice	88
3	2	(United States) Kyle Masson	72
4	1	(United States) Nicholas Boulle	68
5	3	(United States) Sean Rayhall	60

GTLM Drivers' Championship standings
Pos.	+/–	Driver	Points
1	1	(Spain) Antonio García (Denmark) Jan Magnussen	124
2	1	(United States) Joey Hand (Germany) Dirk Müller	118
3	1	(France) Patrick Pilet (Germany) Dirk Werner	110
4	4	(United States) Bill Auberlen (United Kingdom) Alexander Sims	108
5	2	(Australia) Ryan Briscoe (United Kingdom) Richard Westbrook	107

GTD Drivers' Championship standings
Pos.	+/–	Driver	Points
1		(Netherlands) Jeroen Bleekemolen (United States) Ben Keating	133
2		(Italy) Alessandro Balzan (Denmark) Christina Nielsen	109
3		(Canada) Daniel Morad	100
4	4	(United States) Bryan Sellers (United States) Madison Snow	93
5		(United States) Lawson Aschenbach (United States) Andrew Davis	91

- Note: Only the top five positions are included for all sets of standings.

Prototype Teams' Championship standings
Pos.	+/–	Team	Points
1		(United States) #10 Wayne Taylor Racing	141
2		(United States) #5 Mustang Sampling Racing	119
3	2	(United States) #31 Whelen Engineering Racing	111
4	1	(United States) #85 JDC-Miller MotorSports	110
5	1	(United States) #2 Tequila Patrón ESM	106

PC Teams' Championship standings
Pos.	+/–	Team	Points
1		(United States) #38 Performance Tech Motorsports	108
2		(United States) #26 BAR1 Motorsports	93
3	1	(United States) #20 BAR1 Motorsports	88
4	1	(United States) #8 Starworks Motorsport	58
5		(United States) #88 Starworks Motorsport	28

GTLM Teams' Championship standings
Pos.	+/–	Team	Points
1	1	(United States) #3 Corvette Racing	124
2	1	(United States) #66 Ford Chip Ganassi Racing	118
3	1	(United States) #911 Porsche GT Team	110
4	4	(United States) #25 BMW Team RLL	108
5	2	(United States) #67 Ford Chip Ganassi Racing	107

GTD Teams' Championship standings
Pos.	+/–	Team	Points
1		(United States) #33 Riley Motorsports Team AMG	133
2		(United States) #63 Scuderia Corsa	109
3		(United States) #28 Alegra Motorsports	100
4	2	(United States) #48 Paul Miller Racing	93
5	1	(United States) #57 Stevenson Motorsports	91

- Note: Only the top five positions are included for all sets of standings.

Prototype Manufacturers' Championship standings
Pos.	+/–	Manufacturer	Points
1		(United States) Cadillac	140
2		(Japan) Nissan	126
3		(Japan) Mazda	122

GTLM Manufacturers' Championship standings
Pos.	+/–	Manufacturer	Points
1	1	(United States) Chevrolet	133
2	1	(United States) Ford	127
3		(Germany) Porsche	118
4	1	(Germany) BMW	114
5	1	(Italy) Ferrari	112

GTD Manufacturers' Championship standing
Pos.	+/–	Manufacturer	Points
1		(Germany) Mercedes-AMG	135
2	1	(Italy) Ferrari	118
3	1	(Germany) Porsche	117
4		(Germany) Audi	109
5	1	(Italy) Lamborghini	109

- Note: Only the top five positions are included for all sets of standings.

IMSA SportsCar Championship
Previous race: BUBBA Grand Prix of Long Beach	2017 season	Next race: Chevrolet Sports Car Classic
