= 2009 KONI Sports Car Challenge =

Motor racing competition

Seasons
- ← 2008 2010 →

The 2009 KONI Sports Car Challenge was the ninth running of the Grand American Road Racing Association's support series. It began on January 22 and ran for ten rounds.

== Schedule ==
- Daytona International Speedway
- Homestead Miami Speedway
- New Jersey Motorsports Park
- Mazda Raceway Laguna Seca
- Lime Rock Park*
- Watkins Glen International
- Mid-Ohio Sports Car Course
- Barber Motorsports Park
- Circuit de Trois-Rivieres
- Miller Motorsports Park
- Virginia International Raceway

*Split classes

== See also ==
- 2009 Continental Tire Sports Car Challenge season
