= Michelin Pilot Challenge =

Car racing competition held in Canada and the USA

- Category: Grand touring Touring car
- Country: United States; Canada
- Inaugural season: 1997
- Drivers' champion: GS: (United States) Vincent Barletta; GS: (United States) Robby Foley; TCR: (United States) Harry Gottsacker; TCR: (Canada) Robert Wickens
- Makes' champion: GS: (Germany) Mercedes-AMG; TCR: (South Korea) Hyundai
- Teams' champion: GS: (United States) #96 Turner Motorsport; TCR: (United States) #33 Bryan Herta Autosport with Curb-Agajanian
- Official website: michelinpilotchallenge.imsa.com

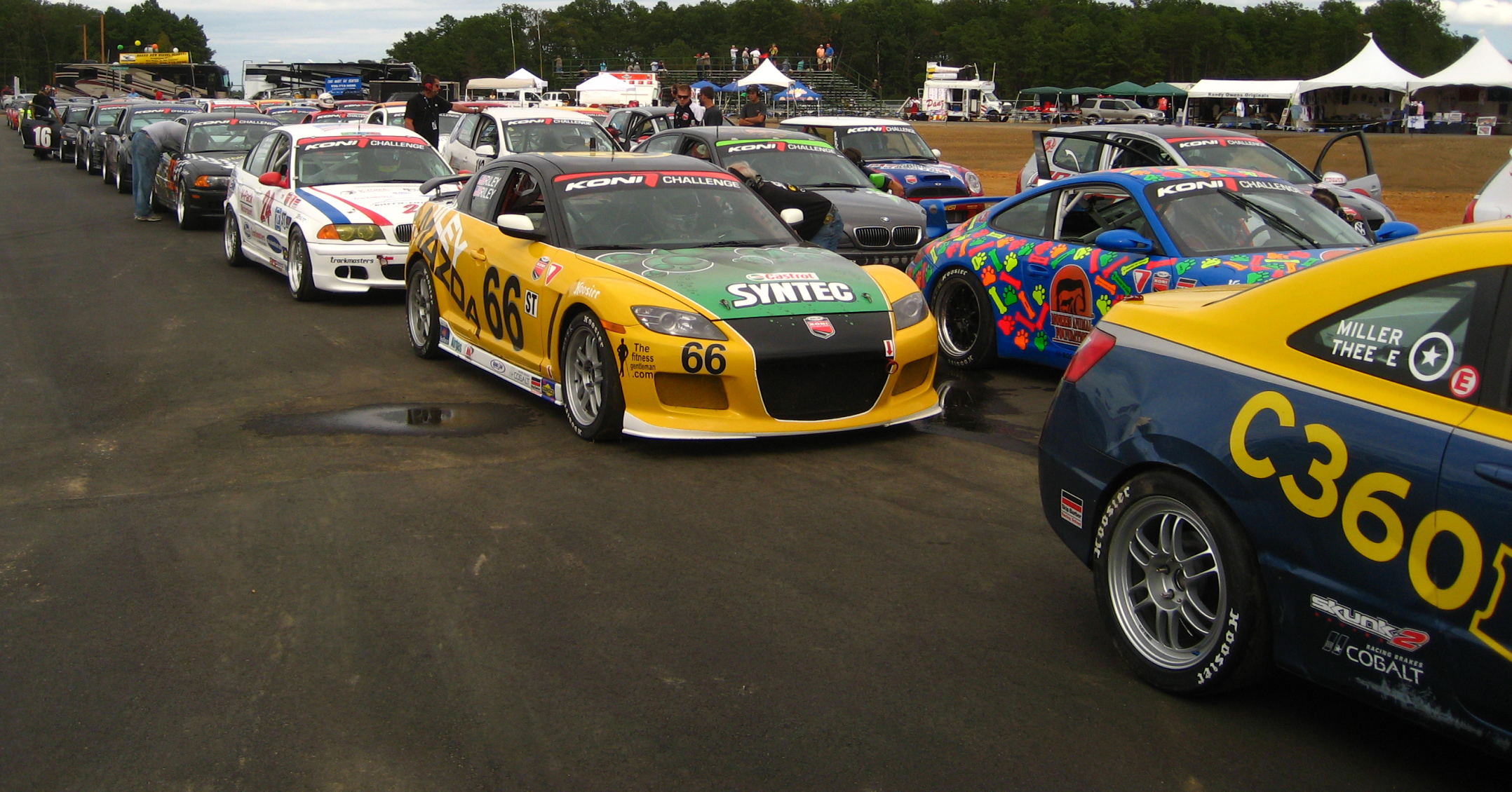
Competitors in the KONI Challenge on a pre-grid at New Jersey Motorsports Park in 2008

The Michelin Pilot Challenge is a grand touring and touring car racing series run by the International Motor Sports Association. Originating from the Canadian Motorola Cup, the series was taken over by Grand-Am in 2001 to become the Grand-Am Cup following the demise of rival IMSA's Firehawk series of similar rules in the US. KONI became series sponsor for the start of the 2007 season when the series became known as the KONI Challenge Series, before renaming once more prior to the start of the 2009 season as the KONI Sports Car Challenge. The series name was once again changed for the 2010 season to Continental Tire Sports Car Challenge. In 2019, the series rebranded again after Michelin was selected to become the new official tire supplier of the series and thus simplified their branding name by removing Sports Car term.

The Continental Challenge was the support series for Grand-Am's premier offering, the Rolex Sports Car Series. In 2014, the series became the support series for the United SportsCar Championship (now known as the IMSA SportsCar Championship) upon the merger of the Rolex Series and the American Le Mans Series.

== Races ==
In traditional sports car racing format, the races are often run with both Grand Sport (GT4) and TCR classes on track simultaneously, which is known as a "combined" race. Occasionally the races will be run in "split classes", with separate races for both classes. This is especially common for shorter venues such as Lime Rock Park. Currently the races are 2 hours in length with a required driver change.

== Telecasts ==
- Until 2013, broadcasts were to Fox Sports 1, formerly Speed Channel. All telecasts are uploaded to the series website after their initial airing.
- From 2019 season, NBC Sports telecast Delayed-Race and IMSA TV has telecast live via Peacock.
- In some countries, NASCAR Holdings (which owns IMSA) feature the Michelin Pilot Challenge is included in NASCAR's media rights deals in Mexico and Brazil that includes NASCAR's three national series, IMSA's two major series, and American Flat Track, all of which have broadcasts produced by NASCAR.
- IMSA TV, which is controlled by NASCAR Productions, has international rights in selected countries.

== Vehicles ==
The series uses two classes in each race. Originally, these were:

- The Grand Sport (GS) class features large-displacement 6-cylinder, 8-cylinder, 10-cylinder or 12-cylinder sports cars as well as small displacement 4-cylinder forced induction sports cars.
- The Street Tuner (ST) class is for smaller 4-cylinder, 5-cylinder or 6-cylinder sedans, hatchbacks, coupes or convertibles.

From 2017, IMSA allowed cars built by "mainstream automotive manufacturers" to SRO GT4 regulations to compete, with a complete phase out of the original Grand-Am GS class the next year. Also in 2018, IMSA introduced TCR Touring Cars as a third class, with the intention of it replacing the Street Tuners as the second class, which happened the following year.

The original format was reminiscent of the original Trans-Am Series, combining conventional sports cars and touring cars, though the Trans-Am Series usually had a single driver per car, unlike the Continental Challenge, which has two drivers per car. Some vehicles in the Continental Challenge have actually been wrapped to resemble the original Trans Am cars, such as the Boss 302 Mustangs of George Follmer and Parnelli Jones or the original Sunoco Camaro. As the Pilot Challenge consists of longer races (2-4 hours), the cars are also eligible for the United States Auto Club's Pirelli World Challenge GT4 or TCR classes, which are one-hour races.

== Champions ==
Season	GS Champion	Car	ST / TCR Champion	Car
2004	(United States) Craig Stanton (United States) Terry Borcheller	Cadillac CTS-V	(United States) David Haskell (Canada) Sylvain Tremblay	Mazda RX-8
2005	(Canada) David Empringham (Canada) Scott Maxwell	Ford Mustang	(United States) David Haskell (Canada) Sylvain Tremblay	Mazda RX-8 (2)
2006	(Sweden) Anders Hainer (United States) Boris Said	BMW M3	(United States) Don Salama (United States) Will Turner	BMW 330i
2007	(United States) Jeff Segal (United States) Jep Thornton	BMW M3 (2)	(United States) Trevor Hopwood (United States) Adam Burrows	BMW 330i (2)
2008	(United States) Joe Foster (Canada) Scott Maxwell	Ford Mustang (2)	(Canada) Jamie Holtom	Chevrolet Cobalt SS
2009	(Canada) Kenny Wilden	Ford Mustang (3)	(United States) Chris Miller	Honda Civic Si
2010	(United States) Charles Espenlaub (United States) Charlie Putman	BMW M3 (3)	(United States) David Thilenius (Note: The Bimmerworld 328i of Bill Heumann and Seth Thomas and the Compass360 Civic of Thilenius and Aschenbach finished the 2010 season tied in ST points. As both teams had the same number of wins and second-place finishes, Thilenius and Aschenbach won the title by virtue of having more third-place finishes.) (United States) Lawson Aschenbach	Honda Civic Si (2)
2011	(Canada) Paul Dalla Lana	BMW M3 (4)	(Sweden) Niclas Jönsson	Kia Forte Koup
2012	(Canada) John Farano (Note: Matt Plumb was victorious in the final race and was the presumed champion, but upon official review he was determined to have been illegally entered in multiple cars, and thus received no points, handing the championship to Farano and Empringham.) (Canada) David Empringham	Porsche 997	(Brazil) Pierre Kleinubing (Canada) Jason Clunie	Mazdaspeed3 (3)
2013	(United States) Nick Longhi (United States) Matt Plumb	Porsche 997 (2)	(United States) Terry Borcheller (United States) Mike LaMarra	BMW 128i (3)
2014	(United States) Trent Hindman	BMW M3 Coupe (5)	(United States) Eric Foss	BMW 328i (4); Porsche Cayman
2015	(United States) Andrew Davis (United Kingdom) Robin Liddell	Chevrolet Camaro	(United Kingdom) Stevan McAleer (United States) Chad McCumbee	Mazda MX-5 (4)
2016	(United States) Billy Johnson (Canada) Scott Maxwell	Ford Mustang GT350R-C (4)	(United States) Nick Galante (United States) Spencer Pumpelly	Porsche Cayman (2)
2017	(United States) Dillon Machavern (United States) Dylan Murcott	Porsche Cayman GT4 Clubsport MR (3)	(United States) Eric Foss	Porsche Cayman (3)
2018	(United States) Hugh Plumb (United States) Owen Trinkler	Mercedes-AMG GT4	(United States) ST: Devin Jones (Canada) ST: Nick Galante (United States) TCR: Britt Casey Jr. (United States) TCR: Tom Long	ST: BMW 328i (5); TCR: Audi RS 3 LMS
2019	(United States) Tyler McQuarrie (United States) Jeff Westphal	Audi R8 LMS GT4	(United States) Michael Lewis (Canada) Mark Wilkins	Hyundai Veloster N TCR
2020	(Canada) Kyle Marcelli (United States) Nate Stacy	Aston Martin Vantage AMR GT4	(Colombia) Gabby Chaves (United States) Ryan Norman	Hyundai Veloster N TCR (2)
2021	(Belgium) Jan Heylen	Porsche 718 Cayman GT4 Clubsport (4)	(United States) Michael Lewis (United States) Taylor Hagler	Hyundai Veloster N TCR (3)
2022	(United States) Alan Brynjolfsson (United States) Trent Hindman	Aston Martin Vantage AMR GT4 (2)	(United States) Taylor Hagler (2) (United States) Michael Lewis (2)	Hyundai Elantra N TCR (4)
2023	(United States) Vincent Barletta (United States) Robby Foley	BMW M4 GT4 Gen II (6)	(United States) Harry Gottsacker (Canada) Robert Wickens	Hyundai Elantra N TCR (5)
2024	(United States) Matt Plumb	Aston Martin Vantage AMR GT4 (3)	(United States) Chris Miller (South Africa) Mikey Taylor	Audi RS 3 LMS TCR (2)
2025	(Belgium) Jan Heylen (United States) Luca Mars	Porsche 718 Cayman GT4 Clubsport (5)	(United States) Harry Gottsacker	Hyundai Elantra N TCR (6)
