= 2009 Continental Tire Sports Car Challenge season =

Motorsport racing season

The 2009 Continental Tire Sports Car Challenge season was the ninth running of the Grand Am Cup Series. It began on January 22 and ran for ten rounds.

== Schedule ==
- Daytona International Speedway
- Homestead Miami Speedway
- New Jersey Motorsports Park
- Mazda Raceway Laguna Seca
- Lime Rock Park- split classes
- Watkins Glen International- long course
- Mid-Ohio Sports Car Course- split classes
- Barber Motorsports Park
- Circuit de Trois-Rivieres
- Miller Motorsports Park
- Virginia International Raceway
