= 2012 Continental Tire Sports Car Challenge =

Motor racing competition

Seasons
- ← 2011 2013 →

The 2012 Continental Tire Sports Car Challenge was the twelfth season of the Grand American Road Racing Association's support series. It began on January 26–27 at Daytona International Speedway. The entire season of the CTSCC was tape-delayed on Speed, but shown live in its entirety on speed2.com.

== Schedule ==
The first nine rounds were announced on November 9, 2011. The tenth was announced on November 14, 2011. All rounds were run to a 2-hour, 30 minute duration.

Rnd	Date	Event Name	Circuit	GS Winning Car	ST Winning Car
Rnd	Date	Event Name	Circuit	GS Winning Drivers	ST Winning Drivers
1	January 26–27	BMW Performance 200 at Daytona	Daytona International Speedway	Ford Mustang Boss 302R	Mazdaspeed3
1	January 26–27	BMW Performance 200 at Daytona	Daytona International Speedway	(United States) Billy Johnson (United States) Jack Roush, Jr.	(Brazil) Pierre Kleinubing (Canada) Jason Clunie
2	March 31	Barber 200	Barber Motorsports Park	Porsche 911 Carrera S	BMW 328i
2	March 31	Barber 200	Barber Motorsports Park	(United States) Nick Longhi (United States) Matt Plumb	(United States) David Levine (United States) Gregory Liefooghe
3	April 28	Kia 200	Homestead-Miami Speedway	Porsche 911 Carrera S	BMW 128i
3	April 28	Kia 200	Homestead-Miami Speedway	(United States) Nick Longhi (United States) Matt Plumb	(Denmark) Martin Jensen (United States) Ryan Ellis
4	May 12	B+ Heroes 200	New Jersey Motorsports Park	Subaru WRX-STI	Honda Civic Si
4	May 12	B+ Heroes 200	New Jersey Motorsports Park	(United States) Andrew Aquilante (United States) Bret Spaude	(United States) Corey Fergus (United States) Owen Trinkler
5	June 9	EMCO Gears Classic	Mid-Ohio Sports Car Course	Ford Mustang Boss 302R	Honda Civic Si
5	June 9	EMCO Gears Classic	Mid-Ohio Sports Car Course	(United States) Billy Johnson (United States) Jack Roush, Jr.	(United States) Chad Gilsinger (Canada) Michael Valiante
6	June 22	Road America	Road America	Porsche 911 Carrera S	Volkswagen Golf GTI
6	June 22	Road America	Road America	(United States) Nick Longhi (United States) Matt Plumb	(United States) Aleks Altberg (United States) David Cheng
7	June 30	Continental Tire 150	Watkins Glen International	Porsche 911 Carrera S	Honda Civic Si
7	June 30	Continental Tire 150	Watkins Glen International	(United States) Nick Longhi (United States) Matt Plumb	(United States) John Schmitt (Canada) Michael Valiante
8	July 27	Brickyard Sports Car Challenge	Indianapolis Motor Speedway	Chevrolet Camaro	BMW 328i
8	July 27	Brickyard Sports Car Challenge	Indianapolis Motor Speedway	(United States) Lawson Aschenbach (United States) Eric Curran	(United States) Daniel Rogers (United States) Seth Thomas
9	September 8	Continental Tire Sports Car Festival	Mazda Raceway Laguna Seca	Chevrolet Camaro	Mazda MX-5
9	September 8	Continental Tire Sports Car Festival	Mazda Raceway Laguna Seca	(United States) John Edwards (United States) Matt Bell	(United States) Derek Whitis (United States) Tom Long
10	September 29	Lime Rock Park	Lime Rock Park (Note: Separate races for GS and ST will be run at Lime Rock.)	Porsche 911 Carrera S	Mazdaspeed3
10	September 29	Lime Rock Park	Lime Rock Park	(United States) Nick Longhi (United States) Matt Plumb	(Brazil) Pierre Kleinubing (Canada) Jason Clunie

== Team news ==
- On October 15, 2011, team owner C. J. Wilson said that he would miss the season due to its interference with the 2012 Major League Baseball season.
- After successfully testing a Roush Performance mustang during the 2011 season, Shelby Blackstock announced on October 20 that he and Jade Buford would be competing in the 2012 season.
- It was announced on October 27, 2011, that BGB Motorsports would be fielding two Porsche 997's, having previously fielded Porsche Caymans. The last time BGB ran the 911 chassis was in 2010, having also won 3 races with the car during the 2008 season. This also marks the retirement of the Cayman from the series.
- It was announced on November 3, 2011, that driver Mark Hillstead had died on August 29 of a heart attack.
- It was announced on November 3, 2011, that driver Aaron Steele would compete in the race at Daytona International Speedway.
- It was announced on November 3, 2011, that Al Carter and Hugh Plumb would return to the B+ Foundation and Fall Line Motorsports. They have entered BMW M3s.
- It was announced on December 1, 2011 that Ryan Ellis and Tyler McQuarrie would return to the series full-time in 2012 campaigning a BMW 128i in the Street Tuner division.

== Event notes ==
- During the round at Indianapolis, a motorhome caught fire. At least half of the vehicle was destroyed. The flames became so intense that the smoke forced a full course caution.
