= Compass Racing =

Sports car team

Compass Racing, formerly known as Compass360 Racing is a professional sports car team that competes in IMSA's Continental Tire Sports Car Challenge and SCCA's Pirelli World Challenge.

== Racing history ==
Compass Racing (formerly Compass360 Racing) won the Continental Tire SportsCar Challenge teams and drivers championships in 2009 and 2010, as well as contributing to manufacturer championships for Acura and Honda in 2006, 2007, 2009, and 2010. The team also won the Canadian Touring Car Championship in 2010. This was followed by championships in the touring car division of the Pirelli World Challenge in 2011, 2013, and 2014.
