= 2020 GT World Challenge America =

Motor racing competition

The 2020 GT World Challenge America powered by AWS was the 14th season of the United States Auto Club's GT World Challenge America, the third season under ownership of the SRO Motorsports Group and the first season without Blancpain sponsorship. The season began on 7 March in Austin and ended on 4 October at Indianapolis.

== Calendar ==
At the annual press conference during the 2019 24 Hours of Spa on 26 July, the Stéphane Ratel Organisation announced the first draft of the 2020 calendar with Las Vegas being dropped from the schedule in favor of Indianapolis. Austin was removed from the provisional calendar on 25 October, before it would return on 8 November after extensive discussions with team owners and stakeholders. The round at Indianapolis became a non-points paying event.

Calendar changes due to COVID-19 pandemic

The round at Canadian Tire Motorsport Park was cancelled. The round at Virginia was moved from 6–7 June to 11–12 July. The round at Indianapolis is back to being a points paying event to replace the cancelled rounds at CTMP with the first three hours of the Indianapolis 8 Hour Intercontinental GT race counting towards the championship.

Round	Circuit	Date
1	(United States) Circuit of the Americas, Elroy, Texas	7–8 March
2	(United States) Virginia International Raceway, Alton, Virginia	11–12 July
3	(United States) Sonoma Raceway, Sonoma, California	8–9 August
4	(United States) Road America, Elkhart Lake, Wisconsin	29–30 August
5	(United States) Circuit of the Americas, Elroy, Texas	19–20 September
6	(United States) Indianapolis Motor Speedway, Indianapolis, Indiana	4 October
Cancelled due to the 2019-20 coronavirus pandemic
Circuit		Original Date
(Canada) Canadian Tire Motorsport Park, Bowmanville, Ontario		16–17 May

Combined races with GT Sports Club America due to drop in expected entries amid COVID-19 pandemic
Also part of the Intercontinental GT Challenge

== Entry list ==
The Pro Cup class was eliminated from the series for this season.

Team	Car	No.	Drivers	Class	Rounds
(Italy) (United States) / Squadra Corse (Note: Car No. 1 entered as Squadra Corse at Round 1 and as TR3 Racing from Round 2 on. Cars No. 24 and 31 entered as TR3 Racing.); (Italy) (United States) / TR3 Racing	Ferrari 488 GT3	1	(Mexico) Martin Fuentes	PA	1–2, 4–6
(Italy) (United States) / Squadra Corse; (Italy) (United States) / TR3 Racing	Ferrari 488 GT3	1	(Brazil) Rodrigo Baptista	PA	1–2, 4–5
(Italy) (United States) / Squadra Corse; (Italy) (United States) / TR3 Racing	Ferrari 488 GT3	1	(Italy) Alessandro Balzan	PA	6
(Italy) (United States) / Squadra Corse; (Italy) (United States) / TR3 Racing	Ferrari 488 GT3	1	(United States) Mark Issa	PA	6
(Italy) (United States) / Squadra Corse; (Italy) (United States) / TR3 Racing	Ferrari 488 GT3	24	(United States) Ziad Ghandour	PA	1, 3
(Italy) (United States) / Squadra Corse; (Italy) (United States) / TR3 Racing	Ferrari 488 GT3	24	(Italy) Matteo Cressoni	PA	1
(Italy) (United States) / Squadra Corse; (Italy) (United States) / TR3 Racing	Ferrari 488 GT3	24	(United States) Jeff Segal	PA	3
(Italy) (United States) / Squadra Corse; (Italy) (United States) / TR3 Racing	Ferrari 488 GT3	31	(United States) John Megrue	Am	2
(Italy) (United States) / Squadra Corse; (Italy) (United States) / TR3 Racing	Ferrari 488 GT3	31	(United States) Bill Sweedler	Am	2
(United States) DXDT Racing	Mercedes-AMG GT3 Evo	04	(United States) Colin Braun	PA	All
(United States) DXDT Racing	Mercedes-AMG GT3 Evo	04	(United States) George Kurtz	PA	All
(United States) DXDT Racing	Mercedes-AMG GT3 Evo	04	(United States) Ben Keating	PA	6
(United States) DXDT Racing	Mercedes-AMG GT3 Evo	63	(United States) David Askew	PA	All
(United States) DXDT Racing	Mercedes-AMG GT3 Evo	63	(United Kingdom) Ryan Dalziel	PA	All
(United States) DXDT Racing	Mercedes-AMG GT3 Evo	63	(United States) Richard Heistand	PA	6
(United States) Vital Speed	Ferrari 488 GT3	6	(United States) Rich Baek	Am	1
(United States) Vital Speed	Ferrari 488 GT3	6	(United States) Mark Issa	Am	1
(United States) Vital Speed	Ferrari 488 GT3	6	(Australia) Ryan Briscoe	PA	6
(United States) Vital Speed	Ferrari 488 GT3	6	(United States) Trevor Baek	PA	6
(United States) Vital Speed	Ferrari 488 GT3	6	(United States) Jeff Westphal	PA	6
(United States) Vital Speed	Ferrari 488 GT3	7	(United States) Trevor Baek	PA	1
(United States) Vital Speed	Ferrari 488 GT3	7	(United States) Jeff Westphal	PA	1
(United States) K-PAX Racing	Bentley Continental GT3	8	(United States) Patrick Byrne	PA	1
(United States) K-PAX Racing	Bentley Continental GT3	8	(United States) Guy Cosmo	PA	1
(United States) GMG Racing	Porsche 911 GT3 R	14	(Netherlands) Jeroen Bleekemolen	PA	1, 3
(United States) GMG Racing	Porsche 911 GT3 R	14	(United States) James Sofronas	PA	1, 3
(United States) Wright Motorsports	Porsche 911 GT3 R	20	(United States) Fred Poordad	Am	1–4
(United States) Wright Motorsports	Porsche 911 GT3 R	20	(United States) Max Root	Am	1–4
(United States) Wright Motorsports	Porsche 911 GT3 R	20	(United States) Fred Poordad	PA	5–6
(United States) Wright Motorsports	Porsche 911 GT3 R	20	(Belgium) Jan Heylen	PA	5–6
(United States) Wright Motorsports	Porsche 911 GT3 R	20	(United States) Max Root	PA	6
(United States) Winward Racing	Mercedes-AMG GT3	33	(United States) Russell Ward	PA	1–3
(United States) Winward Racing	Mercedes-AMG GT3	33	(United States) Bryce Ward	PA	1
(United States) Winward Racing	Mercedes-AMG GT3	33	(United States) Kris Wilson	PA	2–3
(United States) Winward Racing	Mercedes-AMG GT3	33	(United States) Russell Ward	S	4–5
(United States) Winward Racing	Mercedes-AMG GT3	33	(Netherlands) Indy Dontje	S	4
(United States) Winward Racing	Mercedes-AMG GT3	33	(United States) Alec Udell	S	5
(United States) Park Place Motorsports	Porsche 911 GT3 R	73	(United States) David Ducote	Am	1
(United States) Park Place Motorsports	Porsche 911 GT3 R	73	(United States) Alan Metni	Am	1
(United States) Racers Edge Motorsports	Acura NSX GT3	80	(Canada) Kyle Marcelli	PA	1–2, 5
(United States) Racers Edge Motorsports	Acura NSX GT3	80	(Canada) Martin Barkey	PA	1–2
(United States) Racers Edge Motorsports	Acura NSX GT3	80	(United States) Ziad Ghandour	PA	5
(United States) Racers Edge Motorsports	Acura NSX GT3	93	(United States) Shelby Blackstock	S	All
(United States) Racers Edge Motorsports	Acura NSX GT3	93	(United States) Trent Hindman	S	All
(United States) Racers Edge Motorsports	Acura NSX GT3	93	(United States) Robert Megennis	S	6
(United States) Stephen Cameron Racing	BMW M6 GT3	87	(United States) Greg Liefooghe	PA	1
(United States) Stephen Cameron Racing	BMW M6 GT3	87	(United States) Henry Schmitt	PA	1

Icon	Class
S	Silver Cup
PA	Pro-Am Cup
Am	Am Cup

== Race results ==
Bold indicates overall winner.

Round		Circuit	Pole position	Silver Winners	Pro-Am Winners	Am Winners
1	R1	(United States) Austin	(United States) No. 14 GMG Racing	**(United States) No. 93 Racers Edge Motorsports**	(United States) No. 14 GMG Racing	(United States) No. 20 Wright Motorsports
1	R1	(United States) Austin	(Netherlands) Jeroen Bleekemolen (United States) James Sofronas	**(United States) Shelby Blackstock** **(United States) Trent Hindman**	(Netherlands) Jeroen Bleekemolen (United States) James Sofronas	(United States) Fred Poordad (United States) Max Root
1	R2	(United States) Austin	(United States) No. 93 Racers Edge Motorsports	**(United States) No. 93 Racers Edge Motorsports**	(Italy) No. 1 Squadra Corse	(United States) No. 20 Wright Motorsports
1	R2	(United States) Austin	(United States) Shelby Blackstock (United States) Trent Hindman	**(United States) Shelby Blackstock** **(United States) Trent Hindman**	(Brazil) Rodrigo Baptista (Mexico) Martin Fuentes	(United States) Fred Poordad (United States) Max Root
2	R1	(United States) Virginia	(United States) No. 93 Racers Edge Motorsports	(United States) No. 93 Racers Edge Motorsports	**(United States) No. 80 Racers Edge Motorsports**	(United States) No. 31 TR3 Racing
2	R1	(United States) Virginia	(United States) Shelby Blackstock (United States) Trent Hindman	(United States) Shelby Blackstock (United States) Trent Hindman	**(Canada) Martin Barkey** **(Canada) Kyle Marcelli**	(United States) John Megrue (United States) Bill Sweedler
2	R2	(United States) Virginia	(United States) No. 93 Racers Edge Motorsports	(United States) No. 93 Racers Edge Motorsports	**(United States) No. 04 DXDT Racing**	(United States) No. 31 TR3 Racing
2	R2	(United States) Virginia	(United States) Shelby Blackstock (United States) Trent Hindman	(United States) Shelby Blackstock (United States) Trent Hindman	**(United States) Colin Braun** **(United States) George Kurtz**	(United States) John Megrue (United States) Bill Sweedler
3	R1	(United States) Sonoma	(United States) No. 93 Racers Edge Motorsports	(United States) No. 93 Racers Edge Motorsports	**(Italy) No. 1 Squadra Corse**	(United States) No. 20 Wright Motorsports
3	R1	(United States) Sonoma	(United States) Shelby Blackstock (United States) Trent Hindman	(United States) Shelby Blackstock (United States) Trent Hindman	**(Brazil) Rodrigo Baptista** **(Mexico) Martin Fuentes**	(United States) Fred Poordad (United States) Max Root
3	R2	(United States) Sonoma	(United States) No. 93 Racers Edge Motorsports	**(United States) No. 93 Racers Edge Motorsports**	(United States) No. 14 GMG Racing	(United States) No. 20 Wright Motorsports
3	R2	(United States) Sonoma	(United States) Shelby Blackstock (United States) Trent Hindman	**(United States) Shelby Blackstock** **(United States) Trent Hindman**	(Netherlands) Jeroen Bleekemolen (United States) James Sofronas	(United States) Fred Poordad (United States) Max Root
4	R1	(United States) Road America	(United States) No. 33 Winward Racing	**(United States) No. 93 Racers Edge Motorsports**	(Italy) No. 1 Squadra Corse	(United States) No. 20 Wright Motorsports
4	R1	(United States) Road America	(Netherlands) Indy Dontje (United States) Russell Ward	**(United States) Shelby Blackstock** **(United States) Trent Hindman**	(Brazil) Rodrigo Baptista (Mexico) Martin Fuentes	(United States) Fred Poordad (United States) Max Root
4	R2	(United States) Road America	(United States) No. 63 DXDT Racing	**(United States) No. 93 Racers Edge Motorsports**	(United States) No. 04 DXDT Racing	(United States) No. 20 Wright Motorsports
4	R2	(United States) Road America	(United States) David Askew (United Kingdom) Ryan Dalziel	**(United States) Shelby Blackstock** **(United States) Trent Hindman**	(United States) Colin Braun (United States) George Kurtz	(United States) Fred Poordad (United States) Max Root
5	R1	(United States) Austin	(Italy) No. 1 Squadra Corse	(United States) No. 93 Racers Edge Motorsports	**(Italy) No. 1 Squadra Corse**	No Entries
5	R1	(United States) Austin	(Brazil) Rodrigo Baptista (Mexico) Martin Fuentes	(United States) Shelby Blackstock (United States) Trent Hindman	**(Brazil) Rodrigo Baptista** **(Mexico) Martin Fuentes**	No Entries
5	R2	(United States) Austin	(Italy) No. 1 Squadra Corse	(United States) No. 93 Racers Edge Motorsports	**(Italy) No. 1 Squadra Corse**	No Entries
5	R2	(United States) Austin	(Brazil) Rodrigo Baptista (Mexico) Martin Fuentes	(United States) Shelby Blackstock (United States) Trent Hindman	**(Brazil) Rodrigo Baptista** **(Mexico) Martin Fuentes**	No Entries
6		(United States) Indianapolis	(Germany) No. 34 Walkenhorst Motorsport	(United States) No. 93 Racers Edge Motorsports	**(United States) No. 04 DXDT Racing**	No Entries
6		(United States) Indianapolis	(Netherlands) Nicky Catsburg (Brazil) Augusto Farfus (United States) Connor De Phillippi	(United States) Shelby Blackstock (United States) Trent Hindman (United States) Robert Megennis	**(United States) Colin Braun** **(United States) Ben Keating** **(United States) George Kurtz**	No Entries

== Points system ==
Scoring system

Championship points are awarded for the first ten positions in each race. Entries are required to complete 75% of the winning car's race distance in order to be classified and earn points. Individual drivers are required to participate for a minimum of 40 minutes in order to earn championship points in any race.

Standard Points

Position	1st	2nd	3rd	4th	5th	6th	7th	8th	9th	10th
Points	25	18	15	12	10	8	6	4	2	1

Indianapolis Points

Position	1st	2nd	3rd	4th	5th	6th	7th	8th	9th	10th
Points	50	36	30	24	20	16	12	8	4	2

== Drivers' championship ==
Pos.	Driver	Team	AUS1 (United States)		VIR (United States)		SON (United States)		ELK (United States)		AUS2 (United States)		IND (United States)	Points
Pos.	Driver	Team	RD1	RD2	RD1	RD2	RD1	RD2	RD1	RD2	RD1	RD2	RDU	Points
Silver class
1	(United States) Shelby Blackstock (United States) Trent Hindman	(United States) Racers Edge Motorsports	**1**	**1**	**2**	**7**	**5**	**1**	1	**1**	**2**	**2**	**3**	300
2	(United States) Russell Ward	(United States) Winward Racing							**2**	2	3	4		72
3	(Netherlands) Indy Dontje	(United States) Winward Racing							**2**	2				36
4	(United States) Alec Udell	(United States) Winward Racing									3	4		36
Pro-Am class
1	(Mexico) Martin Fuentes	(Italy) Squadra Corse	4	2	3	3	1	6	**4**	5	**1**	**1**	2	234
2	(United States) Colin Braun (United States) George Kurtz	(United States) DXDT Racing	3	3	5	**1**	3	**4**	6	3	WD	WD	1	199
3	(Brazil) Rodrigo Baptista	(Italy) Squadra Corse	4	2	3	3	1	6	**4**	5	**1**	**1**		198
4	(United States) David Askew (United Kingdom) Ryan Dalziel	(United States) DXDT Racing	14	5	4	6	4	5	5	**4**	5	5	Ret	134
5	(Canada) Kyle Marcelli	(United States) Racers Edge Motorsports	5	6	1	2					6	6		89
6	(United States) Ziad Ghandour	(United States) TR3 Racing	6	**4**			6	7						73
6	(United States) Ziad Ghandour	(United States) Racers Edge Motorsports									6	6		73
7	(Canada) Martin Barkey	(United States) Racers Edge Motorsports	5	6	1	2								65
8	(Netherlands) Jeroen Bleekemolen (United States) James Sofronas	(United States) GMG Racing	**2**	9			**DSQ**	3						58
9	(United States) Fred Poordad (Belgium) Jan Heylen	(United States) Wright Motorsports									4	3	**NC**	36
10	(United States) Russell Ward	(United States) Winward Racing	9	DNS	**7**	4	WD	WD						28
11	(Italy) Matteo Cressoni	(United States) TR3 Racing	6	**4**										25
12	(United States) Kris Wilson	(United States) Winward Racing			**7**	4	WD	WD						22
13	(United States) Jeff Segal	(United States) TR3 Racing					6	7						22
14	(United States) Trevor Baek (United States) Jeff Westphal	(United States) Vital Speed	8	10										14
15	(United States) Patrick Byrne (United States) Guy Cosmo	(United States) K-PAX Racing	10	11	WD	WD								8
16	(United States) Bryce Ward	(United States) Winward Racing	9	DNS										6
17	(United States) Greg Liefooghe (United States) Henry Schmitt	(United States) Stephen Cameron Racing	11	Ret										2
Drivers ineligible to score points
	(Italy) Alessandro Balzan	(Italy) Squadra Corse											2	–
Am class
1	(United States) Fred Poordad (United States) Max Root	(United States) Wright Motorsports	7	7	**8**	**8**	**2**	**2**	**3**	**6**				186
2	(United States) John Megrue (United States) Bill Sweedler	(United States) TR3 Racing			6	5								50
3	(United States) David Ducote (United States) Alan Metni	(United States) Park Place Motorsports	**12**	**8**										36
4	(United States) Rich Baek (United States) Mark Issa	(United States) Vital Speed	13	Ret										15
Pos.	Driver	Team	AUS1 (United States)		VIR (United States)		SON (United States)		ELK (United States)		AUS2 (United States)		IND (United States)	Points

Key
Colour	Result
Gold	Race winner
Silver	2nd place
Bronze	3rd place
Green	Points finish
Blue	Non-points finish
Blue	Non-classified finish (NC)
Purple	Did not finish (Ret)
Black	Disqualified (DSQ)
Black	Excluded (EX)
White	Did not start (DNS)
White	Race cancelled (C)
White	Withdrew (WD)
Blank	Did not participate

**Bold** – Pole
Italics – Fastest Lap

== Teams' championship ==
Pos.	Team	Manufacturer	AUS1 (United States)		VIR (United States)		SON (United States)		ELK (United States)		AUS2 (United States)		IND (United States)	Points
Pos.	Team	Manufacturer	RD1	RD2	RD1	RD2	RD1	RD2	RD1	RD2	RD1	RD2	RDU	Points
Silver class
1	(United States) Racers Edge Motorsports	Acura	1	1	2	7	5	1	1	1	2	2	3	300
2	(United States) Winward Racing	Mercedes-AMG							2	2	3	4		72
Pro-Am class
1	(Italy) Squadra Corse	Ferrari	4	2	3	3	1	6	4	5	1	1	2	239
2	(United States) DXDT Racing	Mercedes-AMG	3	3	4	1	3	4	5	3	5	5	1	235
3	(United States) Racers Edge Motorsports	Acura	5	6	1	2					6	6		91
4	(United States) GMG Racing	Porsche	2	9			DSQ	3						60
5	(United States) TR3 Racing	Ferrari	6	4			6	7						52
6	(United States) Wright Motorsports	Porsche									4	3	NC	36
7	(United States) Winward Racing	Mercedes-AMG	9	DNS	7	4	WD	WD						30
8	(United States) Vital Speed	Ferrari	8	10										16
9	(United States) K-PAX Racing	Bentley	10	11	WD	WD								10
10	(United States) Stephen Cameron Racing	BMW	11	Ret										2
Am class
1	(United States) Wright Motorsports	Porsche	7	7	8	8	2	2	3	6				186
2	(United States) TR3 Racing	Ferrari			6	5								50
3	(United States) Park Place Motorsports	Porsche	12	8										36
4	(United States) Vital Speed	Ferrari	13	Ret										15
Pos.	Team	Manufacturer	AUS1 (United States)		VIR (United States)		SON (United States)		ELK (United States)		AUS2 (United States)		IND (United States)	Points

== Manufacturers' championship ==
Pos.	Manufacturer	AUS1 (United States)		VIR (United States)		SON (United States)		ELK (United States)		AUS2 (United States)		IND (United States)	Points
Pos.	Manufacturer	RD1	RD2	RD1	RD2	RD1	RD2	RD1	RD2	RD1	RD2	RDU	Points
1	(Japan) Acura	1	1	1	2	4	1	1	1	2	2	3	246
2	(Italy) Ferrari	4	2	2	3	1	4	4	3	1	1	2	213
3	(Germany) Mercedes-AMG	3	3	3	1	3	3	2	2	3	4	1	213
4	(Germany) Porsche	2	4	4	4	2	2	3	4	4	3		144
5	(Italy) Lamborghini												0
Pos.	Manufacturer	AUS1 (United States)		VIR (United States)		SON (United States)		ELK (United States)		AUS2 (United States)		IND (United States)	Points

== See also ==
- 2020 GT World Challenge Europe
- 2020 GT World Challenge Europe Endurance Cup
- 2020 GT World Challenge Asia
- 2020 GT World Challenge Europe Sprint Cup
