= 2018 SprintX GT Championship Series =

Motor racing competition

The 2018 SprintX GT Championship Series is the final season of the SprintX GT Championship Series. Michael Cooper and Jordan Taylor are the defending champions in the highest class, the Pro class in GT. It is the second season sanctioned by the United States Auto Club. The season began on 23 March at Circuit of the Americas and will end on 12 August at Utah Motorsports Campus. GTS cars are separated from GT and GT Cup, as the GT4-based category has its own races this season.

== Calendar ==
On 17 November 2017, WC Vision announced the 2018 calendar. All rounds are headliner events held in the United States. Circuit of the Americas was the season opener instead of Virginia. Mosport was dropped from the schedule in favor of Portland.

Round	Event	Circuit	Date
1	Grand Prix of Texas	Circuit of the Americas, Elroy, Texas	23–25 March
2	Grand Prix of Virginia presented by Audi Sport	Virginia International Raceway, Alton, Virginia	27–29 April
3	Grand Prix of Lime Rock powered by M	Lime Rock Park, Lakeville, Connecticut	25–26, 28 May
4	58th Rose Cup Races	Portland International Raceway, Portland, Oregon	13–15 July
5	Grand Prix of Utah	Utah Motorsports Campus, Tooele, Utah	10–12 August

== Entry list ==
=== GT/GT Cup ===
Icon	Class
PP	Pro-Pro
PA	Pro-Am
Am	Am
Cup	GT Cup

Team	Car	No.	Drivers	Class	Rounds
(Italy) Squadra Corse Garage Italia	Ferrari 488 GT3	07	(United States) Caesar Bacarella	Am	All
(Italy) Squadra Corse Garage Italia	Ferrari 488 GT3	07	(Mexico) Martin Fuentes	Am	All
(United States) CRP Racing	Mercedes-AMG GT3	2	(Canada) Daniel Morad	PP	1–4
(United States) CRP Racing	Mercedes-AMG GT3	2	(Germany) Fabian Schiller	PP	1–2
(United States) CRP Racing	Mercedes-AMG GT3	2	(Italy) Raffaele Marciello	PP	3
(United States) CRP Racing	Mercedes-AMG GT3	2	(United States) Matthew Brabham	PP	4–5
(United States) CRP Racing	Mercedes-AMG GT3	2	(United States) Michael Cooper	PP	5
(United States) K-PAX Racing	Bentley Continental GT3	3	(Brazil) Rodrigo Baptista	PP	All
(United States) K-PAX Racing	Bentley Continental GT3	3	(Belgium) Maxime Soulet	PP	All
(United States) K-PAX Racing	Bentley Continental GT3	9	(Portugal) Álvaro Parente	PP	All
(United States) K-PAX Racing	Bentley Continental GT3	9	(Spain) Andy Soucek	PP	All
(United States) Precision Driving	Ferrari 458 Challenge Evo	11	(Serbia) Marko Radisic	Cup	1–2
(United States) Precision Driving	Ferrari 458 Challenge Evo	11	(United States) David Roberts	Cup	1–2
(United States) TruSpeed AutoSport	Audi R8 LMS	19	(United States) Parker Chase	PA	All
(United States) TruSpeed AutoSport	Audi R8 LMS	19	(United Kingdom) Ryan Dalziel	PA	All
(United States) TruSpeed AutoSport	Audi R8 LMS	71	(United States) Dore Chaponick Jr.	PA	2
(United States) TruSpeed AutoSport	Audi R8 LMS	71	(United States) Brett Sandberg	PA	2
(United States) Alegra Motorsports	Porsche 911 GT3 R	24	(Denmark) Michael Christensen	PP	All
(United States) Alegra Motorsports	Porsche 911 GT3 R	24	(United States) Spencer Pumpelly	PP	All
(United States) Callaway Competition USA	Corvette C7 GT3-R	26	(United States) Eric Curran	PP	1
(United States) Callaway Competition USA	Corvette C7 GT3-R	26	(Germany) Daniel Keilwitz	PP	1
(United States) Dream Racing Motorsport	Lamborghini Huracán LP 620-2 Super Trofeo	27	(United States) Ryan Hardwick	Cup	1–4
(United States) Dream Racing Motorsport	Lamborghini Huracán LP 620-2 Super Trofeo	27	(Italy) Davide Amaduzzi	Cup	1
(United States) Dream Racing Motorsport	Lamborghini Huracán GT3	55	(Italy) Alessandro Bressan	PA	All
(United States) Dream Racing Motorsport	Lamborghini Huracán GT3	55	(Japan) Yuki Harata	PA	All
(United States) TR3 Racing	Ferrari 488 GT3	31	(Canada) Wei Lu	PA	All
(United States) TR3 Racing	Ferrari 488 GT3	31	(United States) Jeff Segal	PA	All
(United States) GMG Racing	Porsche 911 GT3 R	41	(United States) Alec Udell	PP	1–2
(United States) GMG Racing	Porsche 911 GT3 R	41	(France) Mathieu Jaminet	PP	1
(United States) GMG Racing	Porsche 911 GT3 R	41	(United States) Corey Lewis	PP	2
(United States) DXDT Racing	Lamborghini Huracán GT3	45	(United States) Lawrence DeGeorge	Am	1
(United States) DXDT Racing	Lamborghini Huracán GT3	45	(United States) Lawrence DeGeorge	PA	2
(United States) DXDT Racing	Lamborghini Huracán GT3	45	(Monaco) Cédric Sbirrazzuoli	PA	2
(United States) DXDT Racing	Mercedes-AMG GT3	63	(United States) David Askew	Am	1–2, 4–5
(United States) Precision Performance Motorsports	Lamborghini Huracán GT3	47	(United States) Patrick Byrne	PA	4
(United States) Precision Performance Motorsports	Lamborghini Huracán GT3	47	(United States) Guy Cosmo	PA	4
(United States) Black Swan Racing	Porsche 911 GT3 R	54	(Monaco) Jeroen Bleekemolen	PA	1–4
(United States) Black Swan Racing	Porsche 911 GT3 R	54	(United States) Tim Pappas	PA	1–4
(United States) Topp Racing	Porsche 911 GT3 Cup	56	(United States) David Baker	Cup	1
(Canada) R. Ferri Motorsport	Ferrari 488 GT3	61	(Spain) Miguel Molina	PP	All
(Canada) R. Ferri Motorsport	Ferrari 488 GT3	61	(Finland) Toni Vilander	PP	All
(United States) P1 Motorsports	Lamborghini Huracán LP 620-2 Super Trofeo	71	(Colombia) JC Perez	Cup	1
(United States) Lone Star Racing	Mercedes-AMG GT3	80	(United States) Scott Heckert	PP	1–3, 5
(United States) Lone Star Racing	Mercedes-AMG GT3	80	(United States) Mike Skeen	PP	1–3, 5
(United States) Risi Competizione	Ferrari 488 GT3	82	(United States) Anthony Lazzaro	PA	5
(United States) Risi Competizione	Ferrari 488 GT3	82	(United States) Pierre Mulacek	PA	5
(United States) Vital Speed Motorsport	Ferrari 488 GT3	87	(United States) Rich Baek	Am	4
(United States) Vital Speed Motorsport	Ferrari 488 GT3	87	(United States) Trevor Baek	Am	4
(Canada) Pfaff Motorsports	Porsche 911 GT3 R	96	(Canada) Scott Hargrove	PP	All
(Canada) Pfaff Motorsports	Porsche 911 GT3 R	96	(Germany) Wolf Henzler	PP	All
(United States) Turner Motorsport	BMW M6 GT3	97	(Japan) Takuya Shirasaka	Am	5
(United States) Turner Motorsport	BMW M6 GT3	97	(Japan) Naoto Takeda	Am	5
(United States) AM Motorsports	Porsche 911 GT3 Cup	99	(United States) Alan Metni	Cup	1

=== GTS ===
Team	Car	No.	Drivers	Class	Rounds
(United States) GMG Racing	Audi R8 LMS GT4	04	(United States) Colin Braun	Pro-Am	All
(United States) GMG Racing	Audi R8 LMS GT4	04	(United States) George Kurtz	Pro-Am	All
(United States) GMG Racing	Audi R8 LMS GT4	2	(United States) Jason Bell	Am	3–5
(United States) GMG Racing	McLaren 570S GT4	8	(United States) Andy Lee	Pro-Am	1–2
(United States) GMG Racing	McLaren 570S GT4	8	(United States) Elias Sabo	Pro-Am	1–2
(United States) GMG Racing	Audi R8 LMS GT4	8	(United States) Andy Lee	Pro-Am	5
(United States) GMG Racing	Audi R8 LMS GT4	8	(United States) Elias Sabo	Pro-Am	5
(United States) GMG Racing	Audi R8 LMS GT4	14	(United States) James Sofronas	Pro-Am	All
(United States) GMG Racing	Audi R8 LMS GT4	14	(United States) Alex Welch	Pro-Am	All
(United States) Rearden Racing	Audi R8 LMS GT4	06	(United States) Vesko Kozarov	Am	1
(United States) Rearden Racing	Audi R8 LMS GT4	06	(United States) Ace Robey	Am	1
(United States) Rearden Racing	Audi R8 LMS GT4	19	(United States) Jeff Burton	Am	All
(United States) Rearden Racing	Porsche Cayman GT4 Clubsport MR	70	(United States) Edward Nakato	Am	4
(United States) Rearden Racing	Porsche Cayman GT4 Clubsport MR	70	(United States) Scott Peterson	Am	4
(United States) Blackdog Racing	Chevrolet Camaro GT4.R	1	(United States) Lawson Aschenbach	Pro-Am	All
(United States) Blackdog Racing	Chevrolet Camaro GT4.R	1	(United States) Andy Pilgrim	Pro-Am	All
(United States) Blackdog Racing	Chevrolet Camaro GT4.R	11	(United States) Michael Cooper	Pro-Am	All
(United States) Blackdog Racing	Chevrolet Camaro GT4.R	11	(United States) Tony Gaples	Pro-Am	All
(United States) M1 GT Racing	Audi R8 LMS GT4	2	(United States) Jason Bell	Am	1–2
(United States) Epic Motorsports	BMW M4 GT4	3	(United States) Randy Mueller	Am	All
(United States) Epic Motorsports	BMW M4 GT4	3	(United States) Michael Camus	Am	1–4
(United States) Epic Motorsports	BMW M4 GT4	3	(United States) William Vanjonack	Am	5
(United States) PF Racing	Ford Mustang GT4	10	(United States) Vinnie Allegretta	Pro-Am	All
(United States) PF Racing	Ford Mustang GT4	10	(United States) JR Pesek	Pro-Am	All
(United States) PF Racing	Ford Mustang GT4	40	(United States) James Pesek	Pro-Am	All
(United States) PF Racing	Ford Mustang GT4	40	(United States) Shelby Blackstock	Pro-Am	1–4
(United States) PF Racing	Ford Mustang GT4	40	(United States) Patrick Gallagher	Pro-Am	5
(United States) PF Racing	Ford Mustang GT4	55	(United States) Jade Buford	Pro-Am	All
(United States) PF Racing	Ford Mustang GT4	55	(Canada) Scott Maxwell	Pro-Am	1–2, 4–5
(United States) PF Racing	Ford Mustang GT4	55	(United States) Patrick Gallagher	Pro-Am	3
(United States) Ian Lacy Racing	Ginetta G55 GT4	12	(United States) Drew Staveley	Am	All
(United States) Ian Lacy Racing	Ginetta G55 GT4	24	(United States) Frank Gannett	Am	All
(United States) Ian Lacy Racing	Ginetta G55 GT4	43	(United States) Steve Burns	Am	1–2, 4–5
(Canada) Pfaff Motorsports	Porsche Cayman GT4 Clubsport MR	13	(Canada) Orey Fidani	Pro-Am	All
(Canada) Pfaff Motorsports	Porsche Cayman GT4 Clubsport MR	13	(Canada) Kyle Marcelli	Pro-Am	All
(United States) Classic BMW	BMW M4 GT4	17	(United Kingdom) Stevan McAleer	Pro-Am	All
(United States) Classic BMW	BMW M4 GT4	17	(United States) Justin Raphael	Pro-Am	All
(United States) Classic BMW	BMW M4 GT4	27	(United States) Jason Hart	Pro-Am	1–2
(United States) Classic BMW	BMW M4 GT4	27	(United States) Mike Vess	Pro-Am	1–2
(United States) Classic BMW	BMW M4 GT4	92	(United States) Toby Grahovec	Am	All
(United States) Classic BMW	BMW M4 GT4	92	(United States) Chris Ohmacht	Am	All
(United States) Classic BMW	BMW M4 GT4	113	(United States) Daren Jorgenson	Am	4–5
(United States) Classic BMW	BMW M4 GT4	113	(United States) Brett Strom	Am	4–5
(United States) Motorsport USA	Maserati GranTurismo MC GT4	18	(United States) Mike McAleenan	Am	4
(United States) Motorsport USA	Maserati GranTurismo MC GT4	18	(United States) Cavan O'Keefe	Am	4
(Belgium) Mühlner Motorsports America	Porsche Cayman GT4 Clubsport MR	21	(Germany) Moritz Kranz	Pro-Am	2, 4
(Belgium) Mühlner Motorsports America	Porsche Cayman GT4 Clubsport MR	21	(Switzerland) Gabriele Piana	Pro-Am	2, 4
(Belgium) Mühlner Motorsports America	Porsche Cayman GT4 Clubsport MR	21	(Germany) Moritz Kranz	Am	3
(Belgium) Mühlner Motorsports America	Porsche Cayman GT4 Clubsport MR	21	(Dominican Republic) Efrin Castro	Am	3
(Belgium) Mühlner Motorsports America	Porsche Cayman GT4 Clubsport MR	24	(Puerto Rico) Keith Jensen	Am	4
(United States) Precision Driving	BMW M4 GT4	22	(Serbia) Marko Radisic	Am	1–2
(United States) Precision Driving	BMW M4 GT4	22	(United States) David Roberts	Am	1–2
(United States) / Case-it Racing by Flying Lizard (Note: Car No. 23 entered as Case-it Racing by Flying Lizard and car No. 45 entered as Flying Lizard Motorsports.); (United States) / Flying Lizard Motorsports	Audi R8 LMS GT4	23	(United States) Ryan Eversley	Pro-Am	All
(United States) / Case-it Racing by Flying Lizard; (United States) / Flying Lizard Motorsports	Audi R8 LMS GT4	23	(United States) Adam Merzon	Pro-Am	All
(United States) / Case-it Racing by Flying Lizard; (United States) / Flying Lizard Motorsports	Audi R8 LMS GT4	45	(United States) Mike Hedlund	Am	1–4
(United States) / Case-it Racing by Flying Lizard; (United States) / Flying Lizard Motorsports	Audi R8 LMS GT4	45	(United States) Michael Dinan	Pro-Am	5
(United States) / Case-it Racing by Flying Lizard; (United States) / Flying Lizard Motorsports	Audi R8 LMS GT4	45	(United States) Robby Foley	Pro-Am	5
(United States) NOLAsport	Porsche Cayman GT4 Clubsport MR	32	(Puerto Rico) Keith Jensen	Am	2–3
(United States) NOLAsport	Porsche Cayman GT4 Clubsport MR	47	(United States) Jason Hart	Pro-Am	3
(United States) NOLAsport	Porsche Cayman GT4 Clubsport MR	47	(United States) Matt Travis	Pro-Am	3
(United States) Winward Racing	Mercedes-AMG GT4	33	(United States) Bryce Ward	Pro-Am	3
(United States) Winward Racing	Mercedes-AMG GT4	33	(United States) Russell Ward	Pro-Am	3
(United States) Murillo Racing	Mercedes-AMG GT4	34	(United States) Matt Fassnacht	Pro-Am	All
(United States) Murillo Racing	Mercedes-AMG GT4	34	(United States) Christian Szymczak	Pro-Am	All
(Canada) ST Racing	BMW M4 GT4	36	(United States) Aurora Straus	Am	All
(Canada) ST Racing	BMW M4 GT4	36	(United States) Al Carter	Am	1
(Canada) ST Racing	BMW M4 GT4	36	(United States) Jon Miller	Am	2–5
(Canada) ST Racing	BMW M4 GT4	38	(Canada) Samantha Tan	Pro-Am	All
(Canada) ST Racing	BMW M4 GT4	38	(Canada) Nick Wittmer	Pro-Am	All
(United States) Team Panoz Racing	Panoz Avezzano GT4	50	(United States) Ian James	Pro-Am	All
(United States) Team Panoz Racing	Panoz Avezzano GT4	50	(United States) Matt Keegan	Pro-Am	All
(United States) Team Panoz Racing	Panoz Avezzano GT4	51	(United States) Preston Calvert	Am	All
(United States) KohR Motorsports	Ford Mustang GT4	52	(United States) Dean Martin	Pro-Am	1
(United States) KohR Motorsports	Ford Mustang GT4	52	(United States) Nate Stacy	Pro-Am	1
(United States) Racers Edge Motorsports	SIN R1 GT4	54	(Canada) Mark Pavan	Am	All
(United States) Racers Edge Motorsports	SIN R1 GT4	69	(United States) Harry Gottsacker	Pro-Am	All
(United States) KPR	McLaren 570S GT4	62	(United States) Mark Klenin	Pro-Am	1, 4–5
(United States) KPR	McLaren 570S GT4	62	(Canada) Max Riddle	Pro-Am	1
(United States) KPR	McLaren 570S GT4	62	(United States) Mark Klenin	Am	2
(United States) KPR	McLaren 570S GT4	62	(United States) Kris Wilson	Am	2
(United States) KPR	Audi R8 LMS GT4	62	(United States) Mark Klenin	Pro-Am	3
(United States) KPR	Audi R8 LMS GT4	62	(Canada) Max Riddle	Pro-Am	3
(United States) TRG	Porsche Cayman GT4 Clubsport MR	66	(United States) Derek DeBoer	Am	1–2, 4
(United States) TRG	Porsche Cayman GT4 Clubsport MR	66	(United States) Sean Gibbons	Am	1–2, 4
(United States) MarcoPolo Motorsports	KTM X-Bow GT4	71	(United States) Nicolai Elghanayan	Am	1, 3–5
(United States) Robinson Racing	Chevrolet Camaro GT4.R	72	(United States) Canaan O'Connell	Pro-Am	5
(United States) Robinson Racing	Chevrolet Camaro GT4.R	72	(United States) Johnny O'Connell	Pro-Am	5
(United States) Robinson Racing	Mercedes-AMG GT4	74	(United States) Shane Lewis	Pro-Am	1–3
(United States) Robinson Racing	Mercedes-AMG GT4	74	(United States) Gar Robinson	Pro-Am	1–3
(United States) Robinson Racing	Chevrolet Camaro GT4.R	74	(United States) Shane Lewis	Pro-Am	4–5
(United States) Robinson Racing	Chevrolet Camaro GT4.R	74	(United States) Gar Robinson	Pro-Am	4–5
(United States) Volt Racing	Ford Mustang GT4	77	(United States) Alan Brynjolfsson	Pro-Am	2
(United States) Volt Racing	Ford Mustang GT4	77	(United States) Trent Hindman	Pro-Am	2
(Canada) Compass Racing	McLaren 570S GT4	78	(United States) Paul Holton	Pro-Am	All
(Canada) Compass Racing	McLaren 570S GT4	78	(United States) Ray Mason	Pro-Am	1–3
(Canada) Compass Racing	McLaren 570S GT4	78	(United States) Al Carter	Pro-Am	4
(Canada) Compass Racing	McLaren 570S GT4	78	(United States) Andrew Novich	Pro-Am	5
(United States) Stephen Cameron Racing	BMW M4 GT4	88	(United States) Greg Liefooghe	Am	1–2, 4–5
(United States) Stephen Cameron Racing	BMW M4 GT4	88	(United States) Henry Schmitt	Am	1–2, 4–5
(United States) JCR Motorsports	Maserati GranTurismo MC GT4	89	(Canada) Fred Roberts	Am	2
(United States) JCR Motorsports	Maserati GranTurismo MC GT4	99	(United States) Jeff Courtney	Am	1–2
(United States) RHC Lawrence-Strom	BMW M4 GT4	113	(United States) Daren Jorgensen	Pro-Am	1
(United States) RHC Lawrence-Strom	BMW M4 GT4	113	(United States) Cameron Lawrence	Pro-Am	1

== Race results ==
Round		Circuit	GT Pro-Pro Winners	GT Pro-Am Winners	GT Am Winners	GT Cup Winners	GTS Pro-Am Winners	GTS Am Winners
1	R1	Austin	(Canada) No. 61 R. Ferri Motorsport	(United States) No. 55 Dream Racing Motorsport	(Italy) No. 07 Squadra Corse Garage Italia	(United States) No. 71 P1 Motorsports	(United States) No. 55 PF Racing	(United States) No. 12 Ian Lacy Racing
1	R1	Austin	(Spain) Miguel Molina (Finland) Toni Vilander	(Italy) Alessandro Bressan (Japan) Yuki Harata	(United States) Caesar Bacarella (Mexico) Martín Fuentes	(Colombia) JC Perez	(United States) Jade Buford (Canada) Scott Maxwell	(United States) Drew Staveley
1	R2	Austin	(Canada) No. 61 R. Ferri Motorsport	(United States) No. 31 TR3 Racing	(Italy) No. 07 Squadra Corse Garage Italia	(United States) No. 71 P1 Motorsports	(United States) No. 14 GMG Racing	(Canada) No. 36 ST Racing
1	R2	Austin	(Spain) Miguel Molina (Finland) Toni Vilander	(Canada) Wei Lu (United States) Jeff Segal	(United States) Caesar Bacarella (Mexico) Martín Fuentes	(Colombia) JC Perez	(United States) James Sofronas (United States) Alex Welch	(United States) Al Carter (United States) Aurora Straus
2	R1	Virginia	(United States) No. 3 K-PAX Racing	(United States) No. 19 TruSpeed AutoSport	(Italy) No. 07 Squadra Corse Garage Italia	(United States) No. 27 Dream Racing Motorsport	(United States) No. 77 Volt Racing	(United States) No. 92 Classic BMW
2	R1	Virginia	(Brazil) Rodrigo Baptista (Belgium) Maxime Soulet	(United States) Parker Chase (United States) Ryan Dalziel	(United States) Caesar Bacarella (Mexico) Martín Fuentes	(United States) Ryan Hardwick	(United States) Alan Brynjolfsson (United States) Trent Hindman	(United States) Toby Grahovec (United States) Chris Ohmacht
2	R2	Virginia	(United States) No. 80 Lone Star Racing	(United States) No. 55 Dream Racing Motorsport	(Italy) No. 07 Squadra Corse Garage Italia	(United States) No. 27 Dream Racing Motorsport	(United States) No. 14 GMG Racing	(Canada) No. 36 ST Racing
2	R2	Virginia	(United States) Scott Heckert (United States) Mike Skeen	(Italy) Alessandro Bressan (Japan) Yuki Harata	(United States) Caesar Bacarella (Mexico) Martín Fuentes	(United States) Ryan Hardwick	(United States) James Sofronas (United States) Alex Welch	(United States) Jon Miller (United States) Aurora Straus
3	R1	Lime Rock	(United States) No. 24 Alegra Motorsports	(United States) No. 19 TruSpeed AutoSport	(Italy) No. 07 Squadra Corse Garage Italia	(United States) No. 27 Dream Racing Motorsport	(United States) No. 55 PF Racing	(United States) No. 71 MarcoPolo Motorsports
3	R1	Lime Rock	(Denmark) Michael Christensen (United States) Spencer Pumpelly	(United States) Parker Chase (United States) Ryan Dalziel	(United States) Caesar Bacarella (Mexico) Martín Fuentes	(United States) Ryan Hardwick	(United States) Jade Buford (United States) Patrick Gallagher	(United States) Nicolai Elghanayan
3	R2	Lime Rock	(Canada) No. 61 R. Ferri Motorsport	(United States) No. 19 TruSpeed AutoSport	(Italy) No. 07 Squadra Corse Garage Italia	(United States) No. 27 Dream Racing Motorsport	(United States) No. 50 Team Panoz Racing	(United States) No. 12 Ian Lacy Racing
3	R2	Lime Rock	(Spain) Miguel Molina (Finland) Toni Vilander	(United States) Parker Chase (United States) Ryan Dalziel	(United States) Caesar Bacarella (Mexico) Martín Fuentes	(United States) Ryan Hardwick	(United States) Ian James (United States) Matt Keegan	(United States) Drew Staveley
4	R1	Portland	(Canada) No. 61 R. Ferri Motorsport	(United States) No. 19 TruSpeed AutoSport	(Italy) No. 07 Squadra Corse Garage Italia	(United States) No. 27 Dream Racing Motorsport	(United States) No. 50 Team Panoz Racing	(United States) No. 3 Epic Motorsports
4	R1	Portland	(Spain) Miguel Molina (Finland) Toni Vilander	(United States) Parker Chase (United States) Ryan Dalziel	(United States) Caesar Bacarella (Mexico) Martín Fuentes	(United States) Ryan Hardwick	(United States) Ian James (United States) Matt Keegan	(United States) James Clay (United States) Randy Mueller
4	R2	Portland	(United States) No. 3 K-PAX Racing	(United States) No. 19 TruSpeed AutoSport	(Italy) No. 07 Squadra Corse Garage Italia	(United States) No. 27 Dream Racing Motorsport	(United States) No. 69 Racers Edge Motorsports	(United States) No. 51 Team Panoz Racing
4	R2	Portland	(Brazil) Rodrigo Baptista (Belgium) Maxime Soulet	(United States) Parker Chase (United States) Ryan Dalziel	(United States) Caesar Bacarella (Mexico) Martín Fuentes	(United States) Ryan Hardwick	(United States) Harry Gottsacker	(United States) Preston Calvert
5	R1	Utah	(Canada) No. 61 R. Ferri Motorsport	(United States) No. 31 TR3 Racing	(United States) No. 63 DXDT Racing	No entries	(United States) No. 50 Team Panoz Racing	(United States) No. 51 Team Panoz Racing
5	R1	Utah	(Spain) Miguel Molina (Finland) Toni Vilander	(Canada) Wei Lu (United States) Jeff Segal	(United States) David Askew	No entries	(United States) Ian James (United States) Matt Keegan	(United States) Preston Calvert
5	R2	Utah	(Canada) No. 61 R. Ferri Motorsport	(United States) No. 31 TR3 Racing	(Italy) No. 07 Squadra Corse Garage Italia	No entries	(United States) No. 69 Racers Edge Motorsports	(United States) No. 92 Classic BMW
5	R2	Utah	(Spain) Miguel Molina (Finland) Toni Vilander	(Canada) Wei Lu (United States) Jeff Segal	(United States) Caesar Bacarella (Mexico) Martín Fuentes	No entries	(United States) Harry Gottsacker	(United States) Toby Grahovec (United States) Chris Ohmacht

== Championship standings ==
=== Drivers' championships ===
Championship points were awarded for the first twenty positions in each race. The overall pole-sitter also received one point. Entries were required to complete 50% of the winning car's race distance in order to be classified and earn points.

Position	**1st**	**2nd**	**3rd**	**4th**	**5th**	**6th**	**7th**	**8th**	**9th**	**10th**	**11th**	**12th**	**13th**	**14th**	**15th**	**16th**	**17th**	**18th**	**19th**	**20th**	**Pole**
Points	25	23	21	19	17	15	14	13	12	11	10	9	8	7	6	5	4	3	2	1	1

==== GT/GT Cup Overall ====
Key
Colour	Result
Gold	Race winner
Silver	2nd place
Bronze	3rd place
Green	Points finish
Blue	Non-points finish
Blue	Non-classified finish (NC)
Purple	Did not finish (Ret)
Black	Disqualified (DSQ)
Black	Excluded (EX)
White	Did not start (DNS)
White	Race cancelled (C)
White	Withdrew (WD)
Blank	Did not participate

Bold – Pole position
Italics – Fastest Lap

Pos.	Driver	Team	AUS		VIR		LIM		POR		UTA		Points
GT
1	(Spain) Miguel Molina (Finland) Toni Vilander	(Canada) R. Ferri Motorsport	1	1	2	8	2	1	1	**7**	1	1	224
2	(Denmark) Michael Christensen (United States) Spencer Pumpelly	(United States) Alegra Motorsports	7	8	5	3	1	3	**2**	4	2	3	198
3	(Canada) Scott Hargrove (Germany) Wolf Henzler	(Canada) Pfaff Motorsports	4	3	3	2	3	4	6	3	4	13	187
4	(Brazil) Rodrigo Baptista (Belgium) Maxime Soulet	(United States) K-PAX Racing	5	6	1	**5**	9	5	13	2	7	4	170
5	(United States) Parker Chase (United States) Ryan Dalziel	(United States) TruSpeed AutoSport	13	9	6	10	5	7	3	1	6	7	152
6	(United States) Scott Heckert (United States) Mike Skeen	(United States) Lone Star Racing	**3**	2	14	1	**9**	6			3	2	150
7	(Canada) Wei Lu (United States) Jeff Segal	(United States) TR3 Racing	11	**4**	10	9	7	8	4	5	5	6	148
8	(Canada) Daniel Morad	(United States) CRP Racing	2	5	**8**	4	6	**13**	7	12			121
9	(Italy) Alessandro Bressan (Japan) Yuki Harata	(United States) Dream Racing Motorsport	8	11	7	7	11	10	5	11	8	Ret	112
10	(United States) Caesar Bacarella (Mexico) Martin Fuentes	(Italy) Squadra Corse Garage Italia	10	13	11	12	12	11	8	6	10	9	108
11	(Portugal) Álvaro Parente (Spain) Andy Soucek	(United States) K-PAX Racing	6	7	Ret	DNS	4	2	Ret	DNS	**NC**	**5**	90
12	(United States) David Askew	(United States) DXDT Racing	12	14	15	14			11	8	9	12	74
13	(Germany) Fabian Schiller	(United States) CRP Racing	2	5	**8**	4							73
14	(Monaco) Jeroen Bleekemolen (United States) Tim Pappas	(United States) Black Swan Racing	9	12	9	11	10	9					66
15	(United States) Alec Udell	(United States) GMG Racing	Ret	10	4	6							45
16	(Australia) Matthew Brabham	(United States) CRP Racing							7	12	Ret	8	36
17	(United States) Corey Lewis	(United States) GMG Racing			4	6							34
18	(Italy) Raffaele Marciello	(United States) CRP Racing					6	**13**					25
19	(United States) Guy Cosmo (United States) Patrick Byrne	(United States) PPM							9	10			23
20	(United States) Trevor Baek (United States) Rich Baek	(United States) Vital Speed Motorsports							10	9			23
21	(Japan) Takuya Shirasaka (Japan) Naoto Takeda	(United States) Turner Motorsport									11	10	21
22	(United States) Pierre Mulacek (United States) Anthony Lazzaro	(United States) Risi Competizione									12	11	19
23	(United States) Lawrence DeGeorge	(United States) DXDT Racing	WD	WD	12	16							15
24	(Monaco) Cédric Sbirrazzuoli	(United States) DXDT Racing			12	16							15
25	(United States) Michael Cooper	(United States) CRP Racing									Ret	8	13
26	(France) Mathieu Jaminet	(United States) GMG Racing	Ret	10									11
27	(United States) Dore Chaponick Jr. (United States) Brett Sandberg	(United States) TruSpeed AutoSport			Ret	13							8
28	(United States) Eric Curran (Germany) Daniel Keilwitz	(United States) Callaway Competition USA	DNS	19									6
GT Cup
1	(United States) Ryan Hardwick	(United States) Dream Racing Motorsport	15	18	**13**	**15**	**13**	**12**	**12**	**13**			198
2	(Colombia) JC Perez	(United States) P1 Motorsports	14	15									50
3	(United States) Alan Metni	(United States) AM Motorsports	**17**	16									43
4	(United States) David Baker	(United States) Topp Racing	16	**17**									43
5	(Italy) Davide Amaduzzi	(United States) Dream Racing Motorsport	15	18									42
	(Serbia) Marko Radisic (United States) David Roberts	(United States) Precision Driving	WD	WD	WD	WD							
Pos.	Driver	Team	AUS		VIR		LIM		POR		UTA		Points

==== GT Pro-Am ====
Pos.	Driver	Team	AUS		VIR		LIM		POR		UTA		Points
1	(United States) Parker Chase (United States) Ryan Dalziel	(United States) TruSpeed AutoSport	13	9	**6**	10	**5**	7	**3**	1	6	**7**	234
2	(Canada) Wei Lu (United States) Jeff Segal	(United States) TR3 Racing	**11**	**4**	10	**9**	7	8	4	**5**	**5**	6	230
3	(Italy) Alessandro Bressan (Japan) Yuki Harata	(United States) Dream Racing Motorsport	8	11	7	7	11	10	5	11	8	Ret	193
4	(Monaco) Jeroen Bleekemolen (United States) Tim Pappas	(United States) Black Swan Racing	9	12	9	11	10	**9**					124
5	(United States) Guy Cosmo (United States) Patrick Byrne	(United States) PPM							9	10			40
6	(United States) Pierre Mulacek (United States) Anthony Lazzaro	(United States) Risi Competizione									12	11	40
7	(United States) Lawrence DeGeorge (Monaco) Cédric Sbirrazzuoli	(United States) DXDT Racing			12	16							32
8	(United States) Dore Chaponick Jr. (United States) Brett Sandberg	(United States) TruSpeed AutoSport			Ret	13							17
Pos.	Driver	Team	AUS		VIR		LIM		POR		UTA		Points

==== GT Am ====
Pos.	Driver	Team	AUS		VIR		LIM	POR	UTA	Points
1	(United States) Caesar Bacarella (Mexico) Martin Fuentes	(Italy) Squadra Corse Garage Italia	10	**13**	**11**	**12**				100
2	(United States) David Askew	(United States) DXDT Racing	**12**	14	15	14				92
	(United States) Lawrence DeGeorge	(United States) DXDT Racing	WD	WD						
Pos.	Driver	Team	AUS		VIR		LIM	POR	UTA	Points

==== GTS Overall ====
Pos.	Driver	Team	AUS		VIR		LIM		POR	UTA	Points
1	(United States) James Sofronas (United States) Alex Welch	(United States) GMG Racing	4	1	2	**1**					93
2	(United States) Jade Buford (Canada) Scott Maxwell	(United States) PF Racing	1	8	6	11					63
3	(United States) Lawson Aschenbach (United States) Andy Pilgrim	(United States) Blackdog Racing	7	33	3	3					56
4	(United States) Alan Brynjolfsson (United States) Trent Hindman	(United States) Volt Racing			1	2					48
5	(United States) Michael Cooper (United States) Tony Gaples	(United States) Blackdog Racing	3	18	15	5					47
6	(United States) Aurora Straus	(Canada) ST Racing	11	6	13	8					46
7	(Canada) Samantha Tan (Canada) Nick Wittmer	(Canada) ST Racing	6	**3**	17	17					45
8	(United States) Harry Gottsacker	(United States) Racers Edge Motorsports	**2**	4	Ret	30					43
9	(United States) Colin Braun (United States) George Kurtz	(United States) GMG Racing	10	20	10	4					42
10	(United States) Drew Staveley	(United States) Ian Lacy Racing	5	7	16	33					36
11	(United States) Toby Grahovec (United States) Chris Ohmacht	(United States) Classic BMW	15	24	4	13					33
12	(United States) Greg Liefooghe (United States) Henry Schmitt	(United States) Stephen Cameron Racing	12	Ret	7	12					32
13	(United States) Mike Hedlund	(United States) Flying Lizard Motorsports	Ret	10	12	10					31
14	(United Kingdom) Stevan McAleer (United States) Justin Raphael	(United States) Classic BMW	24	2	20	15					30
15	(United States) Shane Lewis (United States) Gar Robinson	(United States) Robinson Racing	19	9	**9**	18					30
16	(United States) Paul Holton (United States) Ray Mason	(Canada) Compass Racing	13	5	Ret	DNS					25
17	(United States) Al Carter	(Canada) ST Racing	11	6							25
18	(Canada) Orey Fidani (Canada) Kyle Marcelli	(Canada) Pfaff Motorsports	18	31	14	6					25
19	(United States) Ian James (United States) Matt Keegan	(United States) Team Panoz Racing	Ret	35	5	14					24
20	(United States) Jon Miller	(Canada) ST Racing			13	8					21
21	(United States) Matt Fassnacht (United States) Christian Szymczak	(United States) Murillo Racing	33	14	19	9		DNS			21
22	(United States) Daren Jorgensen (United States) Cameron Lawrence	(United States) RHC Lawrence-Strom	14	12							16
23	(United States) Michael Camus (United States) Randy Mueller	(United States) Epic Motorsports	Ret	32	8	19					15
24	(United States) Jeff Courtney	(United States) JCR Motorsports	WD	WD	11	16					15
25	(Germany) Moritz Kranz (Switzerland) Gabriele Piana	(United States) Mühlner Motorsports America			36	7					14
26	(United States) Dean Martin (United States) Nate Stacy	(United States) KohR Motorsports	9	19							14
27	(United States) Ryan Eversley (United States) Adam Merzon	(United States) Case-it Racing by Flying Lizard	17	11	22	22					14
28	(United States) Jason Hart (United States) Mike Vess	(United States) Classic BMW	8	30	25	24					13
29	(United States) Shelby Blackstock (United States) James Pesek	(United States) PF Racing	16	17	23	29					9
30	(United States) Andy Lee (United States) Elias Sabo	(United States) GMG Racing	Ret	13	33	31					8
31	(United States) Derek DeBoer (United States) Sean Gibbons	(United States) TRG	23	15	28	Ret					6
32	(Serbia) Marko Radisic (United States) David Roberts	(United States) Precision Driving	31	16	29	32					5
33	(United States) Preston Calvert	(United States) Team Panoz Racing	20	25	18	DSQ					4
34	(United States) Mark Klenin	(United States) KPR	21	23	21	20					1
35	(United States) Kris Wilson	(United States) KPR			21	20					1
36	(Canada) Max Riddle	(United States) KPR	21	23							0
37	(United States) Vinnie Allegretta (United States) JR Pesek	(United States) PF Racing	25	21	27	27	WD	WD			0
38	(United States) Jeff Burton	(United States) Rearden Racing	30	28	26	21					0
39	(United States) Jason Bell	(United States) M1 GT Racing	22	27	35	23					0
40	(United States) Nicolai Elghanayan	(United States) MarcoPolo Motorsports	28	22							0
41	(Canada) Fred Roberts	(United States) JCR Motorsports			24	DNS					0
42	(Canada) Mark Pavan	(United States) Racers Edge Motorsports	29	34	30	25					0
43	(United States) Vesko Kozarov (United States) Ace Robey	(United States) Rearden Racing	26	26							0
44	(Puerto Rico) Keith Jensen	(United States) NOLAsport			34	26					0
45	(United States) Frank Gannett	(United States) Ian Lacy Racing	27	Ret	32	28					0
46	(United States) Steve Burns	(United States) Ian Lacy Racing	32	29	31	DNS					0
Pos.	Driver	Team	AUS		VIR		LIM		POR	UTA	Points

==== GTS Am ====
Pos.	Driver	Team	AUS		VIR		LIM	POR	UTA	Points
1	(United States) Aurora Straus	(Canada) ST Racing	11	6	13	8				88
2	(United States) Toby Grahovec (United States) Chris Ohmacht	(United States) Classic BMW	15	24	**4**	13				77
3	(United States) Drew Staveley	(United States) Ian Lacy Racing	5	7	16	33				69
4	(United States) Greg Liefooghe (United States) Henry Schmitt	(United States) Stephen Cameron Racing	12	**Ret**	7	**12**				65
5	(United States) Mike Hedlund	(United States) Flying Lizard Motorsports	Ret	10	12	10				61
6	(United States) Al Carter	(Canada) ST Racing	11	6						48
7	(United States) Michael Camus (United States) Randy Mueller	(United States) Epic Motorsports	Ret	32	8	19				44
8	(United States) Preston Calvert	(United States) Team Panoz Racing	20	25	18	DSQ				43
9	(United States) Derek DeBoer (United States) Sean Gibbons	(United States) TRG	23	15	28	Ret				42
10	(United States) Jeff Burton	(United States) Rearden Racing	30	28	26	21				42
11	(Serbia) Marko Radisic (United States) David Roberts	(United States) Precision Driving	31	16	29	32				41
12	(United States) Jason Bell	(United States) M1 GT Racing	22	27	35	23				41
13	(United States) Jon Miller	(Canada) ST Racing			13	8				40
14	(United States) Jeff Courtney	(United States) JCR Motorsports	WD	WD	11	16				36
15	(Canada) Mark Pavan	(United States) Racers Edge Motorsports	29	34	30	25				35
16	(United States) Nicolai Elghanayan	(United States) MarcoPolo Motorsports	28	22						26
17	(United States) Mark Klenin (United States) Kris Wilson	(United States) KPR			21	20				26
18	(United States) Frank Gannett	(United States) Ian Lacy Racing	27	Ret	32	28				26
19	(United States) Vesko Kozarov (United States) Ace Robey	(United States) Rearden Racing	**26**	26						25
20	(United States) Steve Burns	(United States) Ian Lacy Racing	32	29	31	DNS				22
21	(Puerto Rico) Keith Jensen	(United States) NOLAsport			34	26				14
22	(Canada) Fred Roberts	(United States) JCR Motorsports			24	DNS				11
Pos.	Driver	Team	AUS		VIR		LIM	POR	UTA	Points
