= 2019 Blancpain GT World Challenge America =

Motor racing competition

The 2019 Blancpain GT World Challenge America was the 30th season of the United States Auto Club's Blancpain GT World Challenge America. It was the first under Blancpain sponsorship, taking over from the longtime Pirelli sponsorship, as part of the standardisation of names of Stéphane Ratel Organisation-run GT3 sprint racing series globally, following the series' acquisition by the SRO Motorsports Group. It was also the last under Blancpain sponsorship, after they and the SRO concluded their partnership at the end of 2019. The season began on 2 March in Austin and ended on 20 October at Las Vegas.

== Calendar ==
At the annual press conference during the 2018 24 Hours of Spa on 27 July, the Stéphane Ratel Organisation announced the first draft of the 2019 calendar. The date for the season opening weekend in Austin was confirmed on 15 August. The Grand Finale at Las Vegas was announced on 26 July.

Race format

In previous years under the Pirelli World Challenge name, a race weekend consisted of one Qualifying session, one race on Saturday (in some cases on Friday) - of which the fastest laps set up the grid for the second race - and one race on Sunday. On 7 December 2018, changes to the format of race weekends were announced. In 2019 a race weekend consisted of two races scoring equal points and featuring separate Qualifying sessions for each race. In addition to a revised schedule as the Sprint-format was dropped and the SprintX-format - 90-minute races with two drivers per car and mandatory Pit stops with driver changes - remained, the FIA international points system was adopted.

Round	Circuit	Date
1	(United States) Circuit of the Americas, Elroy, Texas	2–3 March
2	(United States) Virginia International Raceway, Alton, Virginia	27–28 April
3	(Canada) Canadian Tire Motorsport Park, Bowmanville, Ontario	18–19 May
4	(United States) Sonoma Raceway, Sonoma, California	8–9 June
5	(United States) Watkins Glen International, Watkins Glen, New York	31 August–1 September
6	(United States) Road America, Elkhart Lake, Wisconsin	21–22 September
7	(United States) Las Vegas Motor Speedway, Las Vegas, Nevada	19–20 October

== Entry list ==
Team	Car	No.	Drivers	Class	Rounds
(United States) K-PAX Racing	Bentley Continental GT3	3	(Brazil) Rodrigo Baptista	P	All
(United States) K-PAX Racing	Bentley Continental GT3	3	(Belgium) Maxime Soulet	P	All
(United States) K-PAX Racing	Bentley Continental GT3	9	(Portugal) Álvaro Parente	P	All
(United States) K-PAX Racing	Bentley Continental GT3	9	(Spain) Andy Soucek	P	All
(United States) DXDT Racing	Mercedes-AMG GT3	04	(United States) Colin Braun	PA	All
(United States) DXDT Racing	Mercedes-AMG GT3	04	(United States) George Kurtz	PA	All
(United States) DXDT Racing	Mercedes-AMG GT3	63	(United States) David Askew	PA	1–6
(United States) DXDT Racing	Mercedes-AMG GT3	63	(United Kingdom) Ryan Dalziel	PA	1–3, 5–6
(United States) DXDT Racing	Mercedes-AMG GT3	63	(United States) Mike Skeen	PA	4
(United States) Gradient Racing	Acura NSX GT3	5	(United Kingdom) Till Bechtolsheimer	PA	All
(United States) Gradient Racing	Acura NSX GT3	5	(United States) Ryan Eversley	PA	1–2
(United States) Gradient Racing	Acura NSX GT3	5	(Australia) Marc Miller	PA	3–5, 7
(United States) Gradient Racing	Acura NSX GT3	5	(United States) Trent Hindman	PA	6
(United States) US RaceTronics	Mercedes-AMG GT3	6	(United States) Steven Aghakhani	PA	1
(United States) US RaceTronics	Mercedes-AMG GT3	6	(United States) Richard Antinucci	PA	1
(United States) / Squadra Corse (Note: Car No. 7 entered as Squadra Corse and car No. 31 entered as TR3 Racing.); (United States) / TR3 Racing	Ferrari 488 GT3	7	(Mexico) Martin Fuentes	Am	1–2, 4–5
(United States) / Squadra Corse; (United States) / TR3 Racing	Ferrari 488 GT3	7	(United States) Caesar Bacarella	Am	1–2, 4
(United States) / Squadra Corse; (United States) / TR3 Racing	Ferrari 488 GT3	7	(United States) Mark Issa	Am	5
(United States) / Squadra Corse; (United States) / TR3 Racing	Ferrari 488 GT3	7	(Mexico) Martin Fuentes	PA	6–7
(United States) / Squadra Corse; (United States) / TR3 Racing	Ferrari 488 GT3	7	(United States) Mark Issa	PA	6
(United States) / Squadra Corse; (United States) / TR3 Racing	Ferrari 488 GT3	7	(Netherlands) Renger van der Zande	PA	7
(United States) / Squadra Corse; (United States) / TR3 Racing	Ferrari 488 GT3	31	(Canada) Wei Lu	PA	1
(United States) / Squadra Corse; (United States) / TR3 Racing	Ferrari 488 GT3	31	(United States) Jeff Segal	PA	1
(United States) / Squadra Corse; (United States) / TR3 Racing	Ferrari 488 GT3	31	(United States) Patrick Byrne	PA	4
(United States) / Squadra Corse; (United States) / TR3 Racing	Ferrari 488 GT3	31	(United States) Guy Cosmo	PA	4
(United States) Vital Speed Motorsports	Ferrari 488 GT3	8	(Netherlands) Rich Baek	Am	1
(United States) Vital Speed Motorsports	Ferrari 488 GT3	8	(Netherlands) Trevor Baek	Am	1
(United States) GMG Racing	Porsche 911 GT3 R (2019)	14	(United States) Brent Holden	Am	1
(United States) GMG Racing	Porsche 911 GT3 R (2019)	14	(United States) James Sofronas	Am	1
(United States) GMG Racing	Porsche 911 GT3 R (2019)	14	(United States) James Sofronas	PA	4
(United States) GMG Racing	Porsche 911 GT3 R (2019)	14	(Germany) Dirk Werner	PA	4
(United States) One11 Competition	Ferrari 488 GT3	19	(United States) Brian Kaminskey	Am	1–2
(United States) One11 Competition	Ferrari 488 GT3	19	(United States) Chris Cagnazzi	Am	1–2
(United States) One11 Competition	Ferrari 488 GT3	19	(United States) Chris Cagnazzi	PA	4
(United States) One11 Competition	Ferrari 488 GT3	19	(United States) Andy Lally	PA	4
(United States) One11 Competition	Ferrari 488 GT3	19	(Brazil) Sergio Jimenez	Am	5
(United States) One11 Competition	Ferrari 488 GT3	19	(United States) Anthony Lazzaro	Am	5
(United States) One11 Competition	Ferrari 488 GT3	99	(United States) Alfred Caiola	PA	1–2, 4
(United States) One11 Competition	Ferrari 488 GT3	99	(United States) Matt Plumb	PA	1–2, 4
(United States) Alegra Motorsports	Porsche 911 GT3 R (2019)	22	(Canada) Daniel Morad	P	1–6
(United States) Alegra Motorsports	Porsche 911 GT3 R (2019)	22	(United States) Michael de Quesada	P	1–4
(United States) Alegra Motorsports	Porsche 911 GT3 R (2019)	22	(United States) Billy Johnson	P	5–6
(United States) Alegra Motorsports	Porsche 911 GT3 R (2019)	24	(Germany) Wolf Henzler	P	1–6
(United States) Alegra Motorsports	Porsche 911 GT3 R (2019)	24	(Germany) Marco Holzer	P	1–6
(United States) K2R Motorsports	Porsche 911 GT3 R (2019)	38	(United States) Alex Barron	PA	1–2, 4–7
(United States) K2R Motorsports	Porsche 911 GT3 R (2019)	38	(United States) Kevan Millstein	PA	1–2, 4–7
(United States) RealTime Racing	Acura NSX GT3	43	(United States) Bret Curtis (Note: Bret Curtis was ruled out of the second race at Mosport due to back pain. He was replaced by Trent Hindman, which promoted the entry to the Pro class.)	PA	2–3
(United States) RealTime Racing	Acura NSX GT3	43	(United States) Dane Cameron	PA	2–3
(United States) RealTime Racing	Acura NSX GT3	43	(United States) Dane Cameron	P	3
(United States) RealTime Racing	Acura NSX GT3	43	(United States) Trent Hindman	P	3
(United States) RealTime Racing	Acura NSX GT3	43	(United States) Dane Cameron	PA	4–7
(United States) RealTime Racing	Acura NSX GT3	43	(United States) Mike Hedlund	PA	4–7
(United States) Wright Motorsports	Porsche 911 GT3 R (2019)	58	(Canada) Scott Hargrove	P	All
(United States) Wright Motorsports	Porsche 911 GT3 R (2019)	58	(United States) Patrick Long	P	All
(United States) Wright Motorsports	Porsche 911 GT3 R (2019)	91	(United States) Anthony Imperato	PA	All
(United States) Wright Motorsports	Porsche 911 GT3 R (2019)	91	(Norway) Dennis Olsen	PA	1, 3, 5
(United States) Wright Motorsports	Porsche 911 GT3 R (2019)	91	(Australia) Matt Campbell	PA	2, 4, 6–7
(Canada) R. Ferri Motorsport	Ferrari 488 GT3	61	(Finland) Toni Vilander	P	All
(Canada) R. Ferri Motorsport	Ferrari 488 GT3	61	(Spain) Miguel Molina	P	1–4, 7
(Canada) R. Ferri Motorsport	Ferrari 488 GT3	61	(Brazil) Daniel Serra	P	5–6
(United States) Scuderia Corsa	Ferrari 488 GT3	64	(Italy) Alessandro Balzan	PA	7
(United States) Scuderia Corsa	Ferrari 488 GT3	64	(United States) Bret Curtis	PA	7
(United States) P1 Motorsports	Mercedes-AMG GT3	71	(Germany) Maximilian Buhk	PA	1
(United States) P1 Motorsports	Mercedes-AMG GT3	71	(Colombia) JC Perez	PA	1
(United States) Racers Edge Motorsports	Acura NSX GT3	80	(Canada) Martin Barkey	PA	All
(United States) Racers Edge Motorsports	Acura NSX GT3	80	(Canada) Kyle Marcelli	PA	All
(United States) Risi Competizione	Ferrari 488 GT3	82	(United States) Anthony Lazzaro	Am	1
(United States) Risi Competizione	Ferrari 488 GT3	82	(United States) Pierre Mulacek	Am	1
(United States) Stephen Cameron Racing	BMW M6 GT3	87	(United States) Greg Liefooghe	PA	1–2, 4–6
(United States) Stephen Cameron Racing	BMW M6 GT3	87	(United States) Henry Schmitt	PA	1–2, 4–6
(United States) Turner Motorsport	BMW M6 GT3	96	(Japan) Takuya Shirasaka	Am	3, 5–7
(United States) Turner Motorsport	BMW M6 GT3	96	(Japan) Naoto Takeda	Am	3, 5–7
(United States) Autometrics Motorsports	Porsche 911 GT3 R (2017)	991	(United States) Alan Metni	Am	1
(United States) Autometrics Motorsports	Porsche 911 GT3 R (2017)	991	(United States) Joe Toussaint	Am	1

Icon	Class
P	Pro Cup
PA	Pro-Am Cup
Am	Am Cup

== Race results ==
Bold indicates overall winner.

Round		Circuit	Pole position	Pro Winners	Pro-Am Winners	Am Winners
1	R1	(United States) Austin	(United States) No. 9 K-PAX Racing	**(United States) No. 3 K-PAX Racing**	(United States) No. 31 TR3 Racing	(United States) No. 7 Squadra Corse
1	R1	(United States) Austin	(Portugal) Álvaro Parente (Spain) Andy Soucek	**(Brazil) Rodrigo Baptista** **(Belgium) Maxime Soulet**	(Canada) Wei Lu (United States) Jeff Segal	(United States) Caesar Bacarella (Mexico) Martin Fuentes
1	R2	(United States) Austin	(United States) No. 80 Racers Edge Motorsports	**(Canada) No. 61 R. Ferri Motorsport**	(United States) No. 80 Racers Edge Motorsports	(United States) No. 7 Squadra Corse
1	R2	(United States) Austin	(Canada) Martin Barkey (Canada) Kyle Marcelli	**(Spain) Miguel Molina** **(Finland) Toni Vilander**	(Canada) Martin Barkey (Canada) Kyle Marcelli	(United States) Caesar Bacarella (Mexico) Martin Fuentes
2	R1	(United States) Virginia	(United States) No. 9 K-PAX Racing	**(United States) No. 9 K-PAX Racing**	(United States) No. 80 Racers Edge Motorsports	(United States) No. 7 Squadra Corse
2	R1	(United States) Virginia	(Portugal) Álvaro Parente (Spain) Andy Soucek	**(Portugal) Álvaro Parente** **(Spain) Andy Soucek**	(Canada) Martin Barkey (Canada) Kyle Marcelli	(United States) Caesar Bacarella (Mexico) Martin Fuentes
2	R2	(United States) Virginia	(United States) No. 9 K-PAX Racing	**(United States) No. 3 K-PAX Racing**	(United States) No. 43 RealTime Racing	(United States) No. 7 Squadra Corse
2	R2	(United States) Virginia	(Portugal) Álvaro Parente (Spain) Andy Soucek	**(Brazil) Rodrigo Baptista** **(Belgium) Maxime Soulet**	(United States) Dane Cameron (United States) Bret Curtis	(United States) Caesar Bacarella (Mexico) Martin Fuentes
3	R1	(Canada) Mosport	(United States) No. 58 Wright Motorsports	**(Canada) No. 61 R. Ferri Motorsport**	(United States) No. 5 Gradient Racing	No finishers
3	R1	(Canada) Mosport	(Canada) Scott Hargrove (United States) Patrick Long	**(Spain) Miguel Molina** **(Finland) Toni Vilander**	(United Kingdom) Till Bechtolsheimer (United States) Marc Miller	No finishers
3	R2	(Canada) Mosport	(United States) No. 9 K-PAX Racing	**(United States) No. 9 K-PAX Racing**	(United States) No. 80 Racers Edge Motorsports	(United States) No. 96 Turner Motorsport
3	R2	(Canada) Mosport	(Portugal) Álvaro Parente (Spain) Andy Soucek	**(Portugal) Álvaro Parente** **(Spain) Andy Soucek**	(Canada) Martin Barkey (Canada) Kyle Marcelli	(Japan) Takuya Shirasaka (Japan) Naoto Takeda
4	R1	(United States) Sonoma	(Canada) No. 61 R. Ferri Motorsport	**(Canada) No. 61 R. Ferri Motorsport**	(United States) No. 43 RealTime Racing	(United States) No. 7 Squadra Corse
4	R1	(United States) Sonoma	(Spain) Miguel Molina (Finland) Toni Vilander	**(Spain) Miguel Molina** **(Finland) Toni Vilander**	(United States) Dane Cameron (United States) Mike Hedlund	(United States) Caesar Bacarella (Mexico) Martin Fuentes
4	R2	(United States) Sonoma	(United States) No. 91 Wright Motorsports	**(United States) No. 58 Wright Motorsports**	(United States) No. 14 GMG Racing	(United States) No. 7 Squadra Corse
4	R2	(United States) Sonoma	(Australia) Matt Campbell (United States) Anthony Imperato	**(Canada) Scott Hargrove** **(United States) Patrick Long**	(United States) James Sofronas (Germany) Dirk Werner	(United States) Caesar Bacarella (Mexico) Martin Fuentes
5	R1	(United States) Watkins Glen	(United States) No. 9 K-PAX Racing	**(Canada) No. 61 R. Ferri Motorsport**	(United States) No. 43 RealTime Racing	(United States) No. 7 Squadra Corse
5	R1	(United States) Watkins Glen	(Portugal) Álvaro Parente (Spain) Andy Soucek	**(Brazil) Daniel Serra** **(Finland) Toni Vilander**	(United States) Dane Cameron (United States) Mike Hedlund	(Mexico) Martin Fuentes (United States) Mark Issa
5	R2	(United States) Watkins Glen	(Canada) No. 61 R. Ferri Motorsport	**(Canada) No. 61 R. Ferri Motorsport**	(United States) No. 43 RealTime Racing	(United States) No. 7 Squadra Corse
5	R2	(United States) Watkins Glen	(Brazil) Daniel Serra (Finland) Toni Vilander	**(Brazil) Daniel Serra** **(Finland) Toni Vilander**	(United States) Dane Cameron (United States) Mike Hedlund	(Mexico) Martin Fuentes (United States) Mark Issa
6	R1	(United States) Road America	(Canada) No. 61 R. Ferri Motorsport	**(Canada) No. 61 R. Ferri Motorsport**	(United States) No. 43 RealTime Racing	(United States) No. 96 Turner Motorsport
6	R1	(United States) Road America	(Brazil) Daniel Serra (Finland) Toni Vilander	**(Brazil) Daniel Serra** **(Finland) Toni Vilander**	(United States) Dane Cameron (United States) Mike Hedlund	(Japan) Takuya Shirasaka (Japan) Naoto Takeda
6	R2	(United States) Road America	(United States) No. 80 Racers Edge Motorsports	(Canada) No. 61 R. Ferri Motorsport	**(United States) No. 43 RealTime Racing**	(United States) No. 96 Turner Motorsport
6	R2	(United States) Road America	(Canada) Martin Barkey (Canada) Kyle Marcelli	(Brazil) Daniel Serra (Finland) Toni Vilander	**(United States) Dane Cameron** **(United States) Mike Hedlund**	(Japan) Takuya Shirasaka (Japan) Naoto Takeda
7	R1	(United States) Las Vegas	(United States) No. 9 K-PAX Racing	**(United States) No. 9 K-PAX Racing**	(United States) No. 43 RealTime Racing	(United States) No. 96 Turner Motorsport
7	R1	(United States) Las Vegas	(Portugal) Álvaro Parente (Spain) Andy Soucek	**(Portugal) Álvaro Parente** **(Spain) Andy Soucek**	(United States) Dane Cameron (United States) Mike Hedlund	(Japan) Takuya Shirasaka (Japan) Naoto Takeda
7	R2	(United States) Las Vegas	(United States) No. 9 K-PAX Racing	**(United States) No. 9 K-PAX Racing**	(United States) No. 7 Squadra Corse	(United States) No. 96 Turner Motorsport
7	R2	(United States) Las Vegas	(Portugal) Álvaro Parente (Spain) Andy Soucek	**(Portugal) Álvaro Parente** **(Spain) Andy Soucek**	(Mexico) Martin Fuentes (Netherlands) Renger van der Zande	(Japan) Takuya Shirasaka (Japan) Naoto Takeda

== Championship standings ==
Scoring system

Championship points were awarded for the first ten positions in each race. Entries were required to complete 75% of the winning car's race distance in order to be classified and earn points. Individual drivers were required to participate for a minimum of 40 minutes in order to earn championship points in any race.

Position	**1st**	**2nd**	**3rd**	**4th**	**5th**	**6th**	**7th**	**8th**	**9th**	**10th**
Points	25	18	15	12	10	8	6	4	2	1

=== Drivers' championships ===
==== Overall ====
Pos.	Driver	Team	AUS (United States)		VIR (United States)		MOS (Canada)		SON (United States)		WGL (United States)		ELK (United States)		LVS (United States)		Points
Pos.	Driver	Team	RD1	RD2	RD1	RD2	RD1	RD2	RD1	RD2	RD1	RD2	RD1	RD2	RD1	RD2	Points
1	(Finland) Toni Vilander	(Canada) R. Ferri Motorsport	4	1	3	5	1	2	**1**	2	1	**1**	**1**	2	2	3	274
2	(Portugal) Álvaro Parente (Spain) Andy Soucek	(United States) K-PAX Racing	**2**	2	**1**	**Ret**	2	**1**	3	3	**2**	2	9	3	**1**	**1**	237
3	(Brazil) Rodrigo Baptista (Belgium) Maxime Soulet	(United States) K-PAX Racing	1	4	Ret	1	3	3	2	11	3	3	5	4	3	2	195
4	(Spain) Miguel Molina	(Canada) R. Ferri Motorsport	4	1	3	5	1	2	**1**	2					2	3	181
5	(Canada) Scott Hargrove (United States) Patrick Long	(United States) Wright Motorsports	3	3	13	2	**6**	4	6	1	4	4	3	5	5	Ret	160
6	(United States) Dane Cameron	(United States) RealTime Racing			7	6	11	5	5	7	6	5	2	1	4	5	123
7	(United States) Mike Hedlund	(United States) RealTime Racing							5	7	6	5	2	1	4	5	99
8	(Brazil) Daniel Serra	(Canada) R. Ferri Motorsport									1	**1**	**1**	2			93
9	(Germany) Wolf Henzler (Germany) Marco Holzer	(United States) Alegra Motorsports	Ret	DNS	2	3	5	6	4	4	5	10	WD	WD			86
10	(Canada) Martin Barkey (Canada) Kyle Marcelli	(United States) Racers Edge Motorsports	7	**6**	4	12	8	8	Ret	9	8	7	6	**6**	10	7	69
11	(United States) Anthony Imperato	(United States) Wright Motorsports	6	8	Ret	8	12	10	7	**8**	7	8	4	7	7	6	69
12	(Canada) Daniel Morad	(United States) Alegra Motorsports	17	5	11	4	4	7	9	5	9	6	WD	WD			62
13	(United States) Michael de Quesada	(United States) Alegra Motorsports	17	5	11	4	4	7	9	5							52
14	(United Kingdom) Till Bechtolsheimer	(United States) Gradient Racing	9	7	5	9	7	12	10	10	15	9	8	8	6	8	50
15	(Australia) Matt Campbell	(United States) Wright Motorsports			Ret	8			7	**8**			4	7	7	6	46
16	(Mexico) Martin Fuentes	(United States) Squadra Corse	11	10	8	11			13	17	10	13	11	10	8	4	23
17	(Norway) Dennis Olsen	(United States) Wright Motorsports	6	8			12	10			7	8					23
18	(United States) Colin Braun (United States) George Kurtz	(United States) DXDT Racing	15	9	9	7	9	11	11	12	13	11	7	9	9	10	23
19	(United States) Marc Miller	(United States) Gradient Racing					7	12	10	10	15	9			6	8	22
20	(United States) Ryan Eversley	(United States) Gradient Racing	9	7	5	9											20
21	(United States) Trent Hindman	(United States) RealTime Racing						5									18
21	(United States) Trent Hindman	(United States) Gradient Racing											8	8			18
22	(United States) Bret Curtis	(United States) RealTime Racing			7	6	11	WD									16
22	(United States) Bret Curtis	(United States) Scuderia Corsa													11	9	16
23	(United States) James Sofronas	(United States) GMG Racing	18	15					8	6							12
23	(Germany) Dirk Werner	(United States) GMG Racing							8	6							12
24	(United States) David Askew	(United States) DXDT Racing	Ret	DNS	6	16	10	9	Ret	16	14	12	12	12			11
24	(United Kingdom) Ryan Dalziel	(United States) DXDT Racing	Ret	DNS	6	16	10	9			14	12	12	12			11
25	(Canada) Wei Lu (United States) Jeff Segal	(United States) TR3 Racing	5	19													10
26	(United States) Billy Johnson	(United States) Alegra Motorsports									9	6	WD	WD			10
27	(United States) Caesar Bacarella	(United States) Squadra Corse	11	10	8	11			13	17							5
28	(Germany) Maximilian Buhk (Colombia) JC Perez	(United States) P1 Motorsports	8	12													4
29	(United States) Mark Issa	(United States) Squadra Corse									10	13	11	10			2
29	(United States) Alfred Caiola (United States) Matt Plumb	(United States) One11 Competition	13	14	10	10			15	13							2
30	(United States) Steven Aghakhani (United States) Richard Antinucci	(United States) US RaceTronics	10	11													1
30	(United States) Greg Liefooghe (United States) Henry Schmitt	(United States) Stephen Cameron Racing	12	20	Ret	13			14	15	16	14	10	Ret			1
	(Japan) Takuya Shirasaka (Japan) Naoto Takeda	(United States) Turner Motorsport					Ret	13			11	16	13	11	12	11	0
	(United States) Chris Cagnazzi	(United States) One11 Competition	16	Ret	12	15			12	Ret	12	15					0
	(United States) Anthony Lazzaro	(United States) Risi Competizione	14	17													0
	(United States) Anthony Lazzaro	(United States) One11 Competition									12	15					0
	(United States) Brian Kaminskey	(United States) One11 Competition	16	Ret	12	15											0
	(United States) Andy Lally	(United States) One11 Competition							12	Ret							0
	(United States) Alex Barron (United States) Kevan Millstein	(United States) K2R Motorsports	20	18	Ret	14			Ret	14	WD	WD	14	DNS	13	Ret	0
	(United States) Alan Metni (United States) Joe Toussaint	(United States) Autometrics Motorsports	21	13													0
	(United States) Pierre Mulacek	(United States) Risi Competizione	14	17													0
	(United States) Brent Holden	(United States) GMG Racing	18	15													0
	(United States) Rich Baek (United States) Trevor Baek	(United States) Vital Speed Motorsports	19	16													0
	(United States) Mike Skeen	(United States) DXDT Racing							Ret	16							0
	(United States) Patrick Byrne (United States) Guy Cosmo	(United States) TR3 Racing							Ret	Ret							
Guest drivers ineligible to score points
	(Netherlands) Renger van der Zande	(United States) Squadra Corse													8	4	
	(Italy) Alessandro Balzan	(United States) Scuderia Corsa													11	9	
Pos.	Driver	Team	AUS (United States)		VIR (United States)		MOS (Canada)		SON (United States)		WGL (United States)		ELK (United States)		LVS (United States)		Points

Key
Colour	Result
Gold	Race winner
Silver	2nd place
Bronze	3rd place
Green	Points finish
Blue	Non-points finish
Blue	Non-classified finish (NC)
Purple	Did not finish (Ret)
Black	Disqualified (DSQ)
Black	Excluded (EX)
White	Did not start (DNS)
White	Race cancelled (C)
White	Withdrew (WD)
Blank	Did not participate

**Bold** – Pole
Italics – Fastest Lap

==== Pro-Am Cup ====
Pos.	Driver	Team	AUS (United States)		VIR (United States)		MOS (Canada)		SON (United States)		WGL (United States)		ELK (United States)		LVS (United States)		Points
Pos.	Driver	Team	RD1	RD2	RD1	RD2	RD1	RD2	RD1	RD2	RD1	RD2	RD1	RD2	RD1	RD2	Points
1	(Canada) Martin Barkey (Canada) Kyle Marcelli	(United States) Racers Edge Motorsports	7	**6**	4	12	8	8	Ret	9	8	7	6	**6**	10	7	214
2	(United States) Anthony Imperato	(United States) Wright Motorsports	6	8	**Ret**	8	**12**	**10**	7	**8**	**7**	8	4	7	7	6	200
3	(United States) Mike Hedlund	(United States) RealTime Racing							**5**	7	6	5	**2**	1	4	**5**	186
4	(United Kingdom) Till Bechtolsheimer	(United States) Gradient Racing	9	7	5	9	7	12	10	10	15	9	8	8	**6**	8	185
5	(United States) Colin Braun (United States) George Kurtz	(United States) DXDT Racing	15	9	9	7	9	11	11	12	13	11	7	9	9	10	147
6	(United States) David Askew	(United States) DXDT Racing	Ret	DNS	6	16	10	9	Ret	16	14	**12**	12	12			76
7	(United States) Bret Curtis	(United States) RealTime Racing			7	**6**	11	WD									61
7	(United States) Bret Curtis	(United States) Scuderia Corsa													11	9	61
8	(United States) Greg Liefooghe (United States) Henry Schmitt	(United States) Stephen Cameron Racing	12	20	Ret	13			14	15	16	14	10	Ret			41
9	(United States) James Sofronas (Germany) Dirk Werner	(United States) GMG Racing							8	6							40
10	(United States) Alfred Caiola (United States) Matt Plumb	(United States) One11 Competition	13	14	10	10			15	13							38
11	(Canada) Wei Lu (United States) Jeff Segal	(United States) TR3 Racing	5	19													27
12	(Germany) Maximilian Buhk (Colombia) JC Perez	(United States) P1 Motorsports	**8**	12													20
13	(United States) Alex Barron (United States) Kevan Millstein	(United States) K2R Motorsports	20	18	Ret	14			Ret	14	WD	WD	14	DNS	13	Ret	19
14	(United States) Steven Aghakhani (United States) Richard Antinucci	(United States) US RaceTronics	10	11													18
15	(United States) Mark Issa	(United States) Squadra Corse											11	10			14
16	(United States) Chris Cagnazzi (United States) Andy Lally	(United States) One11 Competition							12	Ret							6
	(United States) Patrick Byrne (United States) Guy Cosmo	(United States) TR3 Racing							Ret	Ret							
Drivers ineligible to score Pro-Am class points due to being a solo Pro class driver
	(United States) Dane Cameron	(United States) RealTime Racing			7	**6**	11	WD	**5**	7	6	5	**2**	1	4	**5**	
	(United States) Marc Miller	(United States) Gradient Racing					7	12	10	10	15	9			**6**	8	
	(Mexico) Martin Fuentes	(United States) Squadra Corse											11	10	8	4	
	(Australia) Matt Campbell	(United States) Wright Motorsports			**Ret**	8			7	**8**			4	7	7	6	
	(Norway) Dennis Olsen	(United States) Wright Motorsports	6	8			**12**	**10**			**7**	8					
	(United States) Ryan Eversley	(United States) Gradient Racing	9	7	5	9											
	(United Kingdom) Ryan Dalziel	(United States) DXDT Racing	Ret	DNS	6	16	10	9			14	**12**	12	12			
	(United States) Trent Hindman	(United States) Gradient Racing											8	8			
	(United States) Mike Skeen	(United States) DXDT Racing							Ret	16							
Guest drivers ineligible to score points
	(Netherlands) Renger van der Zande	(United States) Squadra Corse													8	4	
	(Italy) Alessandro Balzan	(United States) Scuderia Corsa													11	9	
Pos.	Driver	Team	AUS (United States)		VIR (United States)		MOS (Canada)		SON (United States)		WGL (United States)		ELK (United States)		LVS (United States)		Points

==== Am Cup ====
Pos.	Driver	Team	AUS (United States)		VIR (United States)		MOS (Canada)		SON (United States)		WGL (United States)		ELK (United States)		LVS (United States)		Points
Pos.	Driver	Team	RD1	RD2	RD1	RD2	RD1	RD2	RD1	RD2	RD1	RD2	RD1	RD2	RD1	RD2	Points
1	(Mexico) Martin Fuentes	(United States) Squadra Corse	11	**10**	**8**	**11**			**13**	**17**	10	13					200
2	(Japan) Takuya Shirasaka (Japan) Naoto Takeda	(United States) Turner Motorsport					**Ret**	**13**			11	**16**	**13**	**11**	**12**	**11**	158
3	(United States) Caesar Bacarella	(United States) Squadra Corse	11	**10**	**8**	**11**			**13**	**17**							150
4	(United States) Chris Cagnazzi	(United States) One11 Competition	16	Ret	12	15					**12**	15					84
5	(United States) Anthony Lazzaro	(United States) Risi Competizione	14	17													61
5	(United States) Anthony Lazzaro	(United States) One11 Competition									**12**	15					61
6	(United States) Brian Kaminskey	(United States) One11 Competition	16	Ret	12	15											51
7	(United States) Mark Issa	(United States) Squadra Corse									10	13					50
8	(United States) Pierre Mulacek	(United States) Risi Competizione	14	17													28
9	(United States) Brent Holden (United States) James Sofronas	(United States) GMG Racing	18	15													27
10	(United States) Alan Metni (United States) Joe Toussaint	(United States) Autometrics Motorsports	**21**	13													26
11	(United States) Rich Baek (United States) Trevor Baek	(United States) Vital Speed Motorsports	19	16													22
Pos.	Driver	Team	AUS (United States)		VIR (United States)		MOS (Canada)		SON (United States)		WGL (United States)		ELK (United States)		LVS (United States)		Points

=== Teams' championships ===
==== Overall ====
Pos.	Team	Manufacturer	AUS (United States)		VIR (United States)		MOS (Canada)		SON (United States)		WGL (United States)		ELK (United States)		LVS (United States)		Points
Pos.	Team	Manufacturer	RD1	RD2	RD1	RD2	RD1	RD2	RD1	RD2	RD1	RD2	RD1	RD2	RD1	RD2	Points
1	(United States) K-PAX Racing	Bentley	**1**	2	**1**	**1**	2	**1**	2	3	**2**	2	5	3	**1**	**1**	282
2	(Canada) R. Ferri Motorsport	Ferrari	4	1	3	5	1	2	**1**	2	1	**1**	**1**	2	2	3	282
3	(United States) Wright Motorsports	Porsche	3	3	13	2	**6**	4	6	**1**	4	4	3	5	5	6	193
4	(United States) RealTime Racing	Acura			7	6	11	5	5	7	6	5	2	1	4	5	144
5	(United States) Alegra Motorsports	Porsche	17	5	2	3	4	6	4	4	5	6	WD	WD			119
6	(United States) Racers Edge Motorsports	Acura	7	**6**	4	12	8	8	Ret	9	8	7	6	**6**	10	7	103
7	(United States) Gradient Racing	Acura	9	7	5	9	7	12	10	10	15	9	8	8	6	8	90
8	(United States) DXDT Racing	Mercedes-AMG	15	9	6	7	9	9	11	12	13	11	7	9	9	10	69
9	(United States) Squadra Corse	Ferrari	11	10	8	11			13	17	10	13	11	10	8	4	50
10	(United States) GMG Racing	Porsche	18	15					8	6							18
11	(United States) Turner Motorsport	BMW					Ret	13			11	16	13	11	12	11	13
12	(United States) TR3 Racing	Ferrari	5	19					Ret	Ret							12
13	(United States) One11 Competition	Ferrari	13	14	10	10			12	13	12	15					11
14	(United States) P1 Motorsports	Mercedes-AMG	8	12													9
15	(United States) US RaceTronics	Mercedes-AMG	10	11													6
16	(United States) Stephen Cameron Racing	BMW	12	20	Ret	13			14	15	16	14	10	Ret			6
17	(United States) K2R Motorsports	Porsche	20	18	Ret	14			Ret	14	WD	WD	14	DNS	13	Ret	1
	(United States) Autometrics Motorsports	Porsche	21	13													0
	(United States) Risi Competizione	Ferrari	14	17													0
	(United States) Vital Speed Motorsports	Ferrari	19	16													0
Guest teams ineligible to score points
	(United States) Scuderia Corsa	Ferrari													11	9	
Pos.	Team	Manufacturer	AUS (United States)		VIR (United States)		MOS (Canada)		SON (United States)		WGL (United States)		ELK (United States)		LVS (United States)		Points

==== Pro-Am Cup ====
Pos.	Team	Manufacturer	AUS (United States)		VIR (United States)		MOS (Canada)		SON (United States)		WGL (United States)		ELK (United States)		LVS (United States)		Points
Pos.	Team	Manufacturer	RD1	RD2	RD1	RD2	RD1	RD2	RD1	RD2	RD1	RD2	RD1	RD2	RD1	RD2	Points
1	(United States) RealTime Racing	Acura			7	**6**	11	WD	**5**	7	6	5	**2**	1	4	**5**	235
2	(United States) Racers Edge Motorsports	Acura	7	**6**	4	12	8	8	Ret	9	8	7	6	**6**	10	7	214
3	(United States) Wright Motorsports	Porsche	6	8	**Ret**	8	**12**	**10**	7	**8**	**7**	8	4	7	7	6	202
4	(United States) Gradient Racing	Acura	9	7	5	9	7	12	10	10	15	9	8	8	**6**	8	189
5	(United States) DXDT Racing	Mercedes-AMG	15	9	6	7	9	9	11	12	13	**11**	7	9	9	10	160
6	(United States) Squadra Corse	Ferrari											11	10	8	4	51
7	(United States) Stephen Cameron Racing	BMW	12	20	Ret	13			14	15	16	14	10	Ret			45
8	(United States) One11 Competition	Ferrari	13	14	10	10			12	13							44
9	(United States) GMG Racing	Porsche							8	6							40
10	(United States) TR3 Racing	Ferrari	5	19					Ret	Ret							27
11	(United States) K2R Motorsports	Porsche	20	18	Ret	14			Ret	14	WD	WD	14	DNS	13	Ret	23
12	(United States) P1 Motorsports	Mercedes-AMG	**8**	12													20
13	(United States) US RaceTronics	Mercedes-AMG	10	11													18
Guest teams ineligible to score Pro-Am class points
	(United States) Scuderia Corsa	Ferrari													11	9	
Pos.	Team	Manufacturer	AUS (United States)		VIR (United States)		MOS (Canada)		SON (United States)		WGL (United States)		ELK (United States)		LVS (United States)		Points

==== Am Cup ====
Pos.	Team	Manufacturer	AUS (United States)		VIR (United States)		MOS (Canada)		SON (United States)		WGL (United States)		ELK (United States)		LVS (United States)		Points
Pos.	Team	Manufacturer	RD1	RD2	RD1	RD2	RD1	RD2	RD1	RD2	RD1	RD2	RD1	RD2	RD1	RD2	Points
1	(United States) Squadra Corse	Ferrari	11	**10**	**8**	**11**			**13**	**17**	10	13					200
2	(United States) Turner Motorsport	BMW					**Ret**	**13**			11	**16**	**13**	**11**	**12**	**11**	158
3	(United States) One11 Competition	Ferrari	16	Ret	12	15					**12**	15					84
4	(United States) Risi Competizione	Ferrari	14	17													28
5	(United States) GMG Racing	Porsche	18	15													27
6	(United States) Autometrics Motorsports	Porsche	**21**	13													26
7	(United States) Vital Speed Motorsports	Ferrari	19	16													22
Pos.	Team	Manufacturer	AUS (United States)		VIR (United States)		MOS (Canada)		SON (United States)		WGL (United States)		ELK (United States)		LVS (United States)		Points

== See also ==
- 2019 Blancpain GT Series
- 2019 Blancpain GT Series Endurance Cup
- 2019 Blancpain GT World Challenge Asia
- 2019 Blancpain GT World Challenge Europe
