= 2020 GT Sports Club America =

The 2020 GT Sports Club America was the inaugural and only season of the SRO Motorsports Group's GT Sports Club America, an auto racing series for grand tourer cars. GT Sports Club America was a championship for Bronze, Titanium and Iron drivers only. The Titanium categorisation is within the Bronze category, for drivers between the age of 50 and 59. The Iron categorisation is within the Bronze category, for drivers over the age of 60. The races are contested with GT2-spec and GT3-spec cars. The season began on 11 July at Virginia and ended on 3 October at Indianapolis.

== Calendar ==
At the annual press conference during the 2019 24 Hours of Spa on 26 July, the Stéphane Ratel Organisation announced the 2020 calendar.

Calendar changes due to COVID-19 pandemic

The season opening round at Virginia was moved from 6–7 June to 11–12 July.

Round	Circuit	Date
1	(United States) Virginia International Raceway, Alton, Virginia	11–12 July
2	(United States) Sonoma Raceway, Sonoma, California	8–9 August
3	(United States) Road America, Elkhart Lake, Wisconsin	29–30 August
4	(United States) Circuit of the Americas, Elroy, Texas	19–20 September
5	(United States) Indianapolis Motor Speedway, Indianapolis, Indiana	2–3 October

Combined races with GT World Challenge America due to drop in expected entries amid COVID-19 pandemic

== Entry list ==
Team	Car	No.	Drivers	Class	Rounds
(United States) GMG Racing	Porsche 911 GT2 RS Clubsport	2	(United States) Jason Bell		All
(United States) GMG Racing	Porsche 911 GT2 RS Clubsport	32	(United States) Kyle Washington	Ti	2, 4–5
(United States) GMG Racing	Porsche 911 GT2 RS Clubsport	57	(United States) Stu Frederick	Iron	All
(United States) GMG Racing	Audi R8 LMS Ultra	14	(United States) James Sofronas	Ti	1, 4–5
(United States) Daskalos Motorsports	Audi R8 LMS Ultra	27	(United States) Jason Daskalos		2, 4–5
(United States) Daskalos Motorsports	Audi R8 LMS Ultra	41	(United States) Walt Sipp		5
(United States) TR3 Racing	Ferrari 488 GT3	31	(United States) Mark Issa		3–5
(United States) TR3 Racing	Ferrari 488 GT3	32	(United States) Brian Pinkstaff	Iron	2
(United States) ATech Design	Porsche 911 GT2 RS Clubsport	54	(United States) Karl Leinsing	Ti	1, 4–5
(United States) ATech Design	Porsche 911 GT2 RS Clubsport	55	(United States) Geoff May	Iron	2
(United States) 311RS Motorsport	Porsche 911 GT2 RS Clubsport	311	(United States) Ryan Gates		All
(United States) 311RS Motorsport	Porsche 911 GT2 RS Clubsport	312	(United States) Hunter Dunham		3
(United States) Altus Motorsports	Ferrari 488 GT3	500	(Canada) Trevor Daley	Iron	1, 3–5
Team Germany - TSE Racing	Mercedes-AMG GT3	999	(Germany) Stefan Dolipski	Ti	4–5

Icon	Class
Ti	Titanium Cup
Iron	Iron Cup

== Race results ==
Round		Circuit	Pole position	Overall winner	Titanium Winner	Iron Winner
1	R1	(United States) Virginia	(United States) No. 311 311RS Motorsport	(United States) No. 311 311RS Motorsport	(United States) No. 54 ATech Design	No Finishers
1	R1	(United States) Virginia	(United States) Ryan Gates	(United States) Ryan Gates	(United States) Karl Leinsing	No Finishers
1	R2	(United States) Virginia	(United States) No. 311 311RS Motorsport	(United States) No. 311 311RS Motorsport	(United States) No. 54 ATech Design	(United States) No. 57 GMG Racing
1	R2	(United States) Virginia	(United States) Ryan Gates	(United States) Ryan Gates	(United States) Karl Leinsing	(United States) Stu Frederick
2	R1	(United States) Sonoma	(United States) No. 27 Daskalos Motorsport	(United States) No. 27 Daskalos Motorsport	(United States) No. 32 GMG Racing	(United States) No. 57 GMG Racing
2	R1	(United States) Sonoma	(United States) Jason Daskalos	(United States) Jason Daskalos	(United States) Kyle Washington	(United States) Stu Frederick
2	R2	(United States) Sonoma	(United States) No. 27 Daskalos Motorsport	(United States) No. 27 Daskalos Motorsport	(United States) No. 32 GMG Racing	(United States) No. 57 GMG Racing
2	R2	(United States) Sonoma	(United States) Jason Daskalos	(United States) Jason Daskalos	(United States) Kyle Washington	(United States) Stu Frederick
3	R1	(United States) Road America	(United States) No. 31 TR3 Racing	(United States) No. 311 311RS Motorsport	No Entries	(United States) No. 57 GMG Racing
3	R1	(United States) Road America	(United States) Mark Issa	(United States) Ryan Gates	No Entries	(United States) Stu Frederick
3	R2	(United States) Road America	(United States) No. 31 TR3 Racing	(United States) No. 31 TR3 Racing	No Entries	(United States) No. 57 GMG Racing
3	R2	(United States) Road America	(United States) Mark Issa	(United States) Mark Issa	No Entries	(United States) Stu Frederick
4	R1	(United States) Austin	(United States) No. 14 GMG Racing	(United States) No. 27 Daskalos Motorsports	(United States) No. 14 GMG Racing	(United States) No. 99 Altus Motorsports
4	R1	(United States) Austin	(United States) James Sofronas	(United States) Jason Daskalos	(United States) James Sofronas	(Canada) Trevor Daley
4	R2	(United States) Austin	(United States) No. 27 Daskalos Motorsports	(United States) No. 31 TR3 Racing	(United States) No. 14 GMG Racing	(United States) No. 99 Altus Motorsports
4	R2	(United States) Austin	(United States) Jason Daskalos	(United States) Mark Issa	(United States) James Sofronas	(Canada) Trevor Daley
4	R1	(United States) Indianapolis	(United States) No. 311 311RS Motorsport	(United States) No. 311 311RS Motorsport	(Germany) No. 11 Team Germany - TSE Racing	(United States) No. 57 GMG Racing
4	R1	(United States) Indianapolis	(United States) Ryan Gates	(United States) Ryan Gates	(Germany) Stefan Dolipski	(United States) Stu Frederick
4	R2	(United States) Indianapolis	(United States) No. 32 GMG Racing	(United States) No. 14 GMG Racing	(Germany) No. 11 Team Germany - TSE Racing	(United States) No. 57 GMG Racing
4	R2	(United States) Indianapolis	(United States) No. 2 Jason Bell	(United States) James Sofronas	(Germany) Stefan Dolipski	(United States) Stu Frederick

== Championship standings ==
Scoring system

Championship points are awarded for the first ten positions in each race. Entries are required to complete 75% of the winning car's race distance in order to be classified and earn points.

Position	**1st**	**2nd**	**3rd**	**4th**	**5th**	**6th**	**7th**	**8th**	**9th**	**10th**
Points	25	18	15	12	10	8	6	4	2	1

=== Drivers' championships ===
==== Overall ====
Pos.	Driver	Team	VIR (United States)		SON (United States)		ELK (United States)		AUS (United States)		IND (United States)		Points
Pos.	Driver	Team	RD1	RD2	RD1	RD2	RD1	RD2	RD1	RD2	RD1	RD2	Points
1	(United States) Ryan Gates	(United States) 311RS Motorsport	**1**	**1**	2	2	1	2	4	3	1	**3**	196
3	(United States) Jason Bell	(United States) GMG Racing	2	2	3	3	3	4	8	4	**3**	2	142
3	(United States) Jason Daskalos	(United States) Daskalos Motorsport			**1**	**1**			1	**2**	Ret	4	105
4	(United States) Stu Frederick	(United States) GMG Racing	Ret	3	4	4	4	3	5	Ret	2	5	104
5	(United States) Mark Issa	(United States) TR3 Racing					**2**	**1**	Ret	1	4	Ret	80
6	(United States) James Sofronas	(United States) GMG Racing	Ret	DNS					**2**	5	8	1	57
7	(United States) Karl Leinsing	(United States) ATech Design	3	4					7	8	6	8	49
8	(United States) Kyle Washington	(United States) GMG Racing			5	5			9	10	10	7	30
9	(Canada) Trevor Daley	(United States) Altus Motorsports	DNS	DNS			Ret	Ret	3	9	5	9	29
10	(Germany) Stefan Dolipski	Team Germany - TSE Racing							6	7	7	6	28
11	(United States) Walt Sipp	(United States) Daskalos Motorsport									9	Ret	2
12	(United States) Brian Pinkstaff	(United States) TR3 Racing			Ret	Wth							0
13	(United States) Geoff May	(United States) ATech Design			DNQ	INF							0
14	(United States) Hunter Dunham	(United States) 311RS Motorsport					DSQ	DSQ					0
Pos.	Driver	Team	VIR (United States)		SON (United States)		ELK (United States)		AUS (United States)		IND (United States)		Points

Key
Colour	Result
Gold	Race winner
Silver	2nd place
Bronze	3rd place
Green	Points finish
Blue	Non-points finish
Blue	Non-classified finish (NC)
Purple	Did not finish (Ret)
Black	Disqualified (DSQ)
Black	Excluded (EX)
White	Did not start (DNS)
White	Race cancelled (C)
White	Withdrew (WD)
Blank	Did not participate

**Bold** – Pole
Italics – Fastest Lap

==== Titanium Cup ====
Pos.	Driver	Team	VIR (United States)		SON (United States)		ELK (United States)		AUS (United States)		IND (United States)		Points
Pos.	Driver	Team	RD1	RD2	RD1	RD2	RD1	RD2	RD1	RD2	RD1	RD2	Points
1	(United States) Kyle Washington	(United States) GMG Racing			**5**	**5**			9	10	10	**7**	119
2	(Germany) Stefan Dolipski	Team Germany - TSE Racing							**6**	**7**	7	6	100
3	(United States) Walt Sipp	(United States) Daskalos Motorsport									**9**	Ret	18
4	(United States) Hunter Dunham	(United States) 311RS Motorsport					**DSQ**	**DSQ**					0
Pos.	Driver	Team	VIR (United States)		SON (United States)		ELK (United States)		AUS (United States)		IND (United States)		Points

==== Iron Cup ====
Pos.	Driver	Team	VIR (United States)		SON (United States)		ELK (United States)		AUS (United States)		IND (United States)		Points
Pos.	Driver	Team	RD1	RD2	RD1	RD2	RD1	RD2	RD1	RD2	RD1	RD2	Points
1	(United States) Stu Frederick	(United States) GMG Racing	**Ret**	**3**	**4**	**4**	**4**	**3**	5	**Ret**	**2**	**5**	193
2	(Canada) Trevor Daley	(United States) Altus Motorsports	DNS	DNS			Ret	Ret	**3**	9	5	9	86
3	(United States) Brian Pinkstaff	(United States) TR3 Racing			Ret	Wth							0
4	(United States) Geoff May	(United States) ATech Design			DNQ	INF							0
Pos.	Driver	Team	VIR (United States)		SON (United States)		ELK (United States)		AUS (United States)		IND (United States)		Points

== See also ==
- 2020 GT World Challenge America
- 2020 GT World Challenge Europe Sprint Cup
