= Moline Swedish Lutheran Cemetery =

Cemetery in Travis County, Texas, US

Coordinates: 30.11895°N 97.63427°W

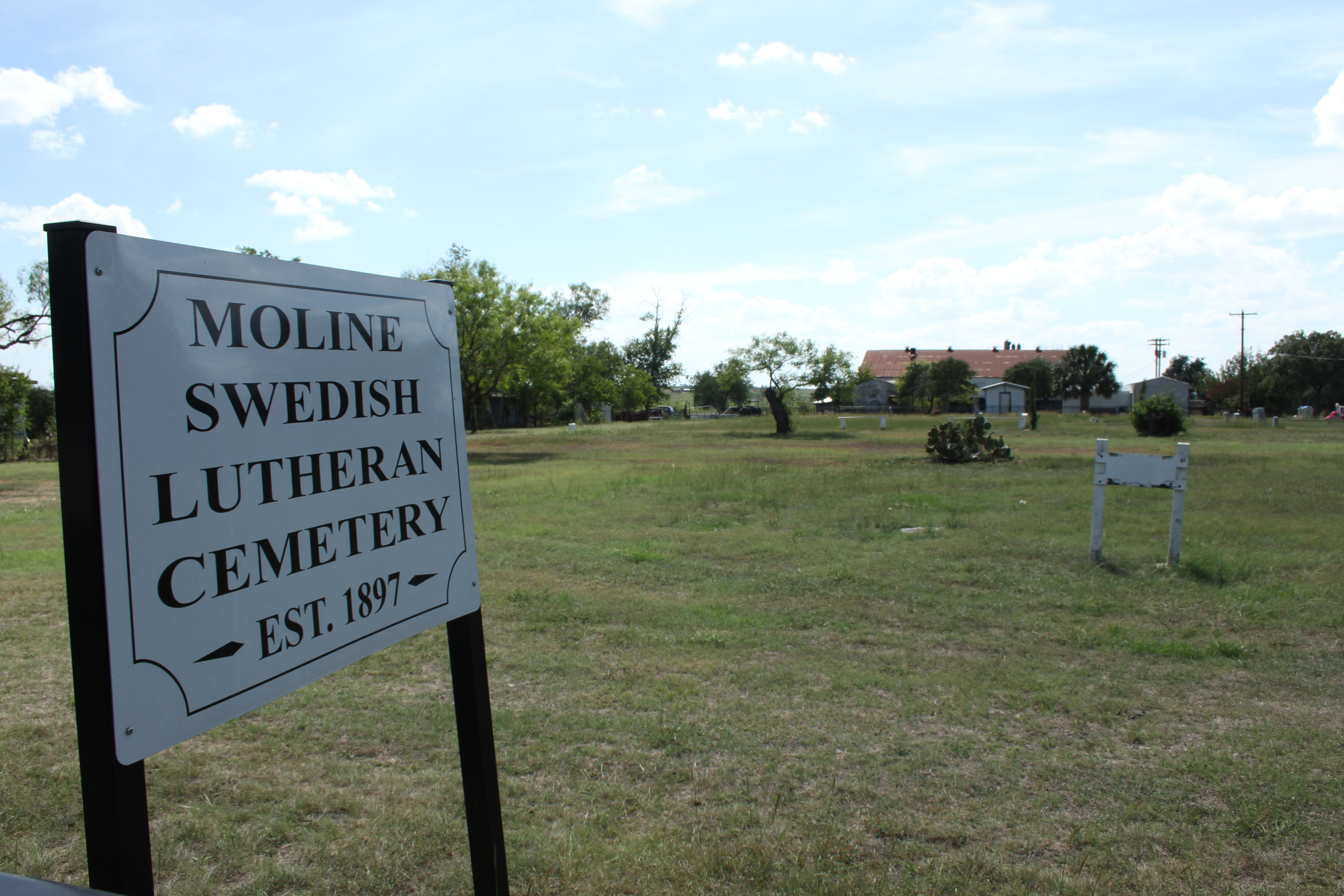
- The Moline Swedish Lutheran Cemetery established in 1897 in Elroy, Texas.
- Interactive map of Moline Swedish Lutheran Cemetery

Details
- Established: 1897
- Location: Elroy, Texas

The Moline Swedish Lutheran Cemetery was established in Elroy, Texas in 1897. It was originally an annex to the Gethsemane Lutheran Church of Austin, Texas. The Swedish population began to move away from the area in the 1930s, and by the 1950s, the congregation was too small to sustain the church. The church was dismantled after closing in 1955. The remaining congregation became the charter members of the Prince of Peace Lutheran Church in Austin, Texas and many of its members became stewards of the site.

== Swedish settlement in Elroy, Texas ==
The Swedish migration to central Texas was largely fueled by the work of Swante Magnus Swenson who came to America in 1836. Swenson eventually settled in Austin, Texas and established numerous successful business endeavors with his uncle Swante Palm. After establishing the SMS Ranches, Swenson became one of the largest landowners in Texas and was encouraged by Samuel Houston to recruit more Swedish immigrants to come work the land holdings. Swenson traveled by ship back and forth to Sweden 16 times beginning in 1848, recruiting his countrymen to come and join his agricultural efforts in the central Texas region. In Elroy, Texas, roughly 70 families of Swedish immigrants established schools, farms, cemeteries, and three churches including the Moline Swedish Lutheran Church (1897), the Swedish Evangelical Free Church (1901), and the Swedish Baptist Church (1903). This "Swedish Pipeline," which primarily ran from Småland to Galveston, slowed greatly by 1910 but the Swedish influence on the region is still visible today.

== Parsonage ==
In 1908, the women of the Moline Swedish Lutheran Church organized and raised funds to buy the lot next to the church and built a parsonage for the pastor and his family. The parsonage also served as a venue for weddings and community gatherings. This building is still standing near the cemetery.

== Friends of Moline Lutheran Cemetery ==
The Friends of Moline Lutheran Cemetery (FMLC) is a nonprofit organization which formed in 2012 to revitalize and maintain the cemetery. This organization works to protect the unique history contained within the Moline Swedish Lutheran Cemetery and raise funds to ensure its enduring accessibility to the public. A grant from the Swedish Council of America has helped fund the FMLC's goal to build a kiosk and information board to help visitors understand the history and geography of the cemetery. Other contributors to the restoration of this cemetery include the Burdine Johnson Foundation, the Gesthemane Lutheran Church and Prince of Peace Lutheran Church of Austin, the University of Texas at Austin School of Information, the Barbro Osher Pro Suecia Foundation, and the Swedish Women's Education Association.

== Adjoining cemetery ==
In 2013, the FMCL discovered an overgrown addition to the Moline Swedish Lutheran Cemetery which had been neglected since the 1960s. This Adjoining Cemetery contains the mostly unmarked resting places of domestic, farm, and cotton gin workers. The damaged, concrete graves were barely visible over the brush and vegetation, and the metal markers and wooden crosses were completely obscured. Research by the FMLC helped identify one name among the markers. Cruz Reynero was born in Mexico in 1914. He and five of his siblings came to Elroy to work at the Swedish Farmers' Cotton Gin. Reynero died at age 19 and was buried in the Adjoining Cemetery, his grave marked with a large, wooden cross. The cross was eventually lost to overgrowth during the cemetery's abandonment, but uncovered and restored by the FMLC in 2013. Another identifiable grave in the Adjoining Cemetery is the granite obelisk raised in memory of Alfonso Torres (1890-1911). Mariano and Delphina Torres, the parents of Alfonzo, came to the United States in 1875 and raised ten children. Alfonso and his siblings all died before age 25 with the exception of Rosendo Torres (1885-1964) who lived to be 79. The obelisk marking Alfonso's grave was broken into three pieces during the cemetery's abandonment and restored by the FMLC in 2013.
