= Elroy, Texas =

Elroy
- Unincorporated community
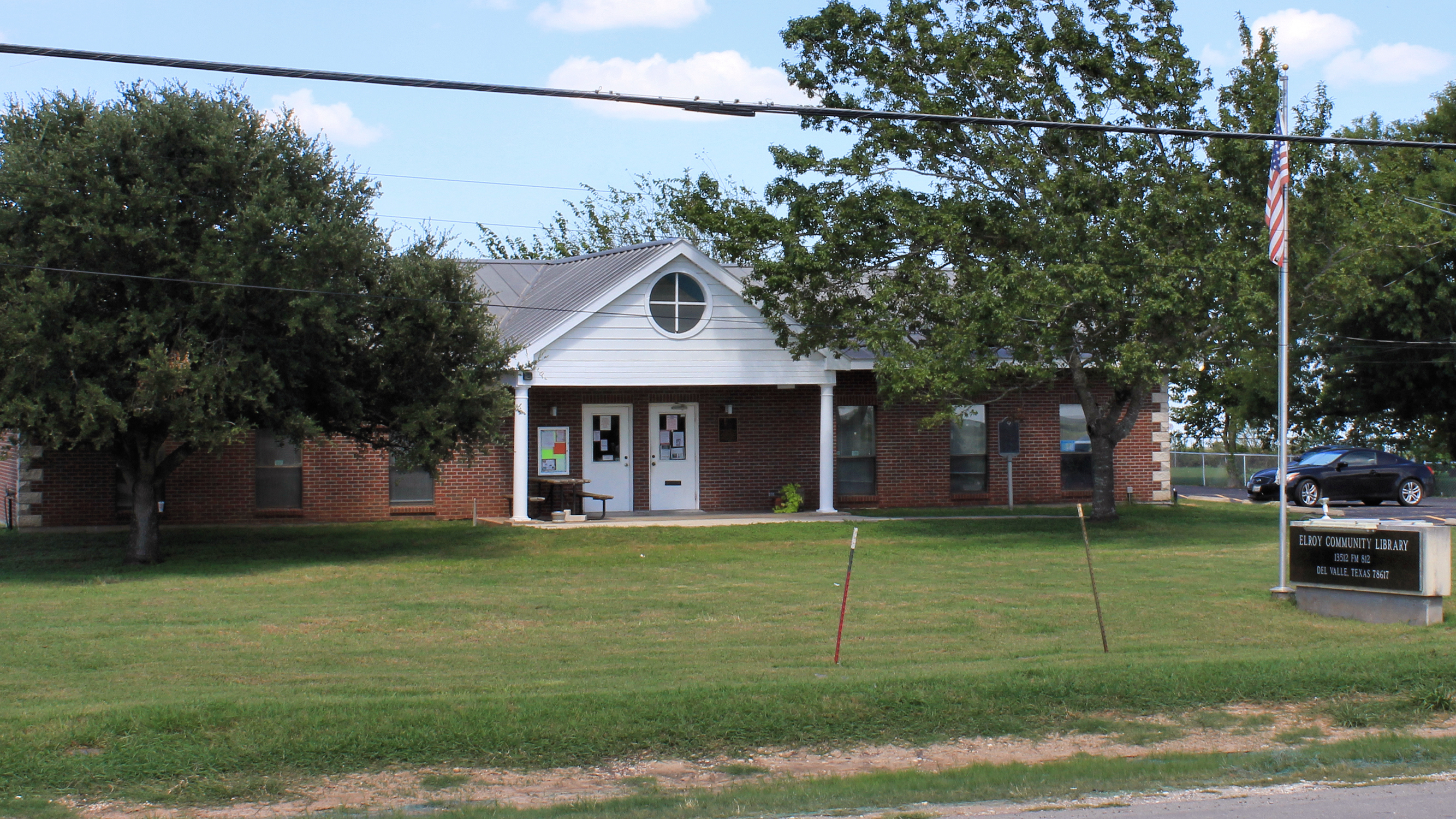
- Elroy Community Library

- Location within the state of Texas Elroy (the United States)
- Coordinates: 30°07′15″N 97°38′07″W
- Country: United States
- State: Texas
- County: Travis
- Time zone: UTC−6 (Central (CST))
  - Summer (DST): UTC−5 (CDT)

Elroy is a small unincorporated community in Travis County, Texas, United States. According to the Handbook of Texas, the community had a population of 125 in 2000. It is located within the Greater Austin metropolitan area.

== History ==
General Antonio López de Santa Anna gave the land of modern-day Elroy to a loyal officer, who swapped it for a horse and saddle to return to Mexico. The Elroy community, also known as Driskill, Dutch Waterhole, or Hume, was established in 1892 and was named by a local store owner after his son, Leroy. A post office opened in Elroy in 1899 with George L. Hume as postmaster. This post office was discontinued in 1902 and mail was sent to Del Valle. The population of Elroy grew from 25 in 1933 to 125 in 1947. Its population was still reported as 125 for the 2000 Decennial Census.

The Moline Swedish Lutheran Cemetery was established in Elroy, Texas in 1897. There are other sites of Swedish-Texan heritage in the area.

In November 1960, a Nike missile site was commissioned east of Elroy (designated military site BG-40). The mission of the site was to protect nearby Bergstrom Air Force Base from Russian bombers. The site was decommissioned in June 1966 and is now privately owned.

As of 2012, Elroy serves as the principal site of a state-of-the-art FIA specification Circuit of the Americas motorsport facility that currently hosts the World Endurance Championship, MotoGP, and the Formula 1 United States Grand Prix.

The Circuit of the Americas also hosted several events, such as the 2015 Lamborghini Super Trofeo, 2018 Pirelli World Challenge, 2018 Trans-Am Series, 2018 SprintX GT Championship Series, 2019 Blancpain GT World Challenge America, 2019 TC America Series, 2019 Trans-Am Series, 2019 GT4 America Series, 2020 GT World Challenge America, 2020 GT4 America Series, 2020 TC America Series, 2020 GT Sports Club America, 2021 GT World Challenge America, 2021 GT America Series, 2021 GT4 America Series, 2021 TC America Series, and the 2015 Motorcycle Grand Prix of the Americas.

The fourth season of Food Paradise was filmed at Wild Bubba's Wild Game Grill in Elroy in 2012. The restaurant closed in 2020 due to the COVID-19 pandemic in Texas and did not reopen.

== Geography ==
Elroy is located 12 miles (19 km) southeast of Austin in southeastern Travis County. The main highway through Elroy is Farm to Market Road 812. Elroy is in the Texas Blackland Prairies ecoregion. The rich soil made the area a historical farming and ranching area, but the land is currently subject to urban sprawl from Austin. Maha Creek runs through Elroy and periodically causes localized flash flooding during heavy storms.

== Education ==
In 1907, Elroy had a two-teacher school for 107 white students and a one-teacher school for 61 black students. Elroy schools were later consolidated in 1961 with the Colorado district, which the next year became the Del Valle Independent School District.

Elroy is served by the Del Valle Independent School District. Popham Elementary School, Del Valle Middle School, and Del Valle High School serve students.

The East Travis Gateway Library District operates the Elroy Library.
