= K-Pax Racing =

(United States) K-PAX Racing
- Founded: 2007
- Founder(s): Jim Haughey
- Base: Sonoma, California
- Current series: GT World Challenge America; GT World Challenge Europe Endurance Cup; Intercontinental GT Challenge
- Former series: US Touring Car Championship
- Current drivers: (Italy) Andrea Caldarelli (South Africa) Jordan Pepper (Italy) Michele Beretta (Canada) Misha Goikhberg (Italy) Giacomo Altoè (Italy) Marco Mapelli
- Teams' Championships: Pirelli World Challenge GT Class; 2016 Pirelli World Challenge GT Class; 2018 Blancpain GT World Challenge America GT 2019
- Drivers' Championships: Pirelli World Challenge GT Class: 2007: Randy Pobst; 2008: Randy Pobst; 2010: Randy Pobst; 2016: Álvaro Parente; US Touring Car Championship: 2012: Robert Thorne
- Website: http://www.kpaxracing.com/

K-PAX Racing is an automobile racing team in the SCCA's Pirelli World Challenge racing series. Founded in 2006, team owner Jim Haughey partnered with Bob Raub, bringing a team of Porsche 911 GT3s to the track. However, from 2009 to 2013, it has campaigned Volvo S60s with great success (K-PAX Racing has also used Volvo C30s in the Touring Car division). For 2014, K-PAX Racing switched to McLaren MP4-12C GT3 race cars and continued its relationship with the manufacturer the following three seasons by updating to the McLaren 650S GT3 model. Since joining the Pirelli World Challenge in 2007, K-PAX Racing has celebrated four driver championships and has solidified the team as a perennial championship contender.

== K-PAX Racing origin ==
K-PAX Racing was founded in 2006 by Haughey, who formerly owned Scandia Auto Service in Sunnyvale, Calif. The team was based out of Denver, Colo. before relocating to Sonoma, Calif. in 2014. The K-PAX name was influenced by the series of books written by Gene Brewer.

== History ==
In 2007, drivers Randy Pobst and Michael Galati raced for K-PAX during its inaugural season, driving Porsche 911 GT3s in the GT class. Taking the World Challenge Series by storm, Pobst won the Drivers' Championship in 2007 and 2008. In 2008, he and Galati took K-PAX Racing to a Manufacturers' Championship for Porsche. In two seasons, they captured six wins, six poles, 26 top-five finishes and 31 top-10s.

K-PAX switched to new turbocharged Volvo S60 T5 AWD race cars in 2009 for both of its drivers. Driven by Pobst and 2005 Series Champion Andy Pilgrim, K-PAX Racing became one of the preeminent teams of the World Challenge Series. Pobst took the championship crown again in the 2010 season.

Meanwhile, K-PAX Racing introduced the smaller Volvo C30 T5 into the World Championship's Touring Car class in 2011. With a $2 million investment, 3R Racing built the Volvo C30s, which were driven by Aaron Povoledo and Robb Holland, who drove the cars to second- and third-place finishes in the 2011 season. During 2011, Povoledo set a record of six pole positions while winning four races and together he and Holland racked up five wins and eight podium finishes.

In 2012, the K-PAX Racing team returned in both the World Challenge and U.S. Touring Car Championship with newcomer Robert Thorne. Thorne, then 19 years old, competed without a teammate in the Touring Car class. In his first time out, Thorne won the 2012 USTCC series title with three pole positions, one win and six podium finishes. Thorne also competed in one World Challenge Series race at Sonoma Raceway, where he took the checkered flag.

At the same time, veteran Alex Figge joined Pobst in the GT Class, with the drivers taking fifth and third, respectively, in the 2012 Pirelli World Challenge series. The followed up in 2013 with Pobst taking fourth in the drivers' standings and Figge taking fifth.

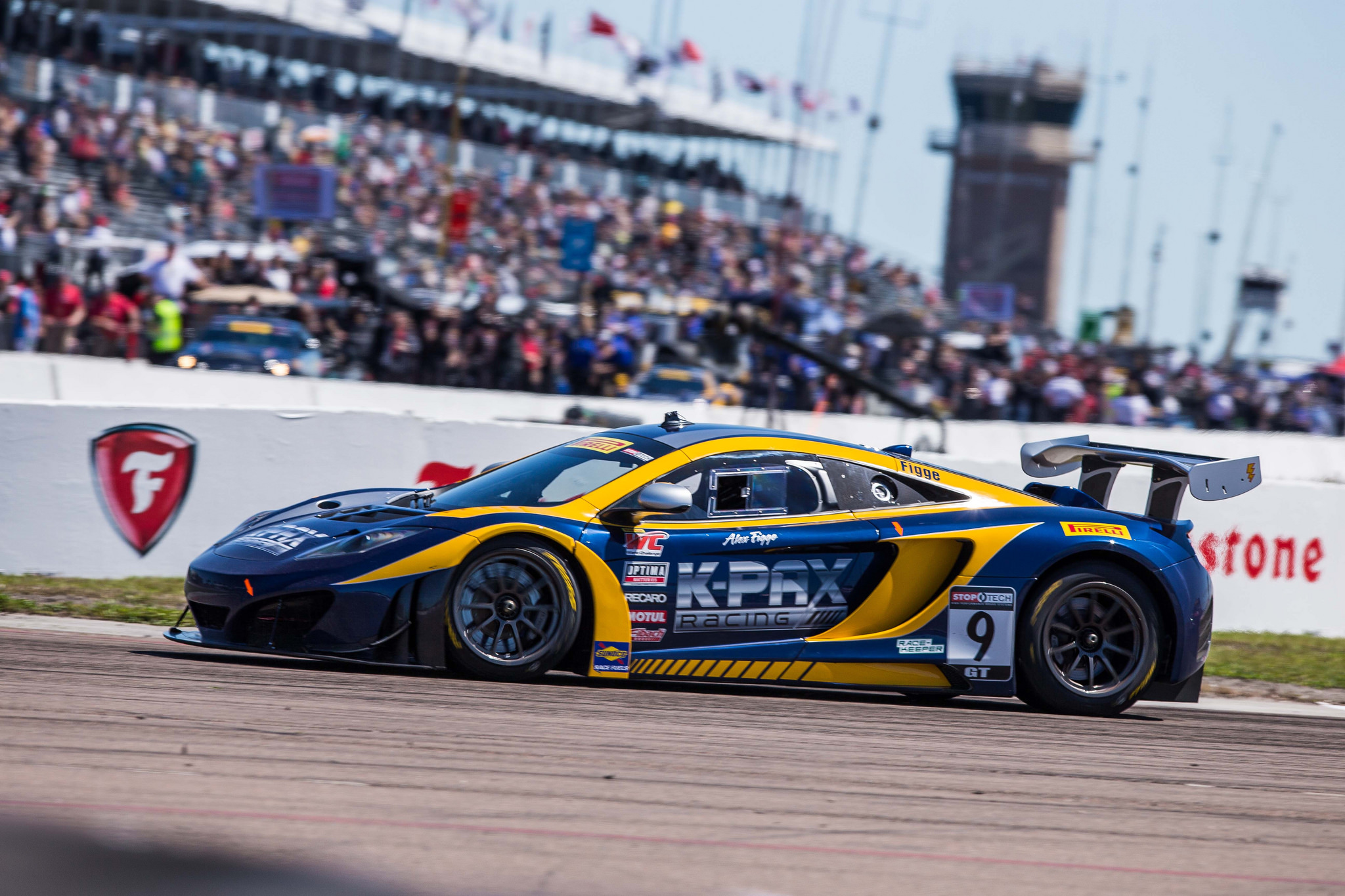
Alex Figge driving the McLaren 12C during the 2014 Pirelli World Challenge season.

In late 2013, K-PAX Racing started a new relationship with British automaker McLaren. During the 2014 season K-PAX Racing competed with two McLaren 12C GT3 cars driven by professional drivers Thorne and Figge. Thorne managed two podiums during the course of the season, securing a win during the very last race of the season at Miller Motorsports Park in Utah.

For the 2015 season, K-PAX began a partnership with Flying Lizard Motorsports. The team continued its relationship with McLaren GT by competing with two McLaren 650S GT3s. Figge was replaced by McLaren GT factory driver Kevin Estre. Estre would take four wins at Austin, Barber, Detroit, and Sonoma, finishing fifth in points. He would later be picked up by Porsche as a factory driver.

For 2016, Estre and Thorne were replaced by McLaren factory driver Álvaro Parente, as well as young drivers Austin Cindric and Colin Thompson. Parente would take six wins and K-PAX's first championship since 2010. Cindric would take three podiums while Thompson struggled to adjust to the McLaren. To complete the season, K-Pax embarked on its first ever endurance event.

For 2017, Cindric transitioned to the NASCAR Camping World Truck Series, and Thompson was released. Replacing Cindric and Thompson was professional driver Bryan Sellers and gentleman driver Mike Hedlund. In addition, K-PAX announced its participation in the Sprint-X championship, with McLaren factory drivers Ben Barnicoat partnering with Parente and veteran Jonny Kane teaming with Sellers in the Pro-Pro category. Hedlund would be teamed with inaugural SprintX champion Michael Lewis in the Pro-Am category. Through the first half of the season, the team fielded three cars before downsizing to its two GT cars. Collectively the team won four races in 2017, finishing runner-up in the Sprint GT Championship.

== K-PAX Performance Cars ==
In late 2010, Haughey partnered with entrepreneur Peter J Nielsen to establish K-PAX Performance Cars. The main objective was to share the knowledge learnt on track by applying it to special edition vehicles and performance parts for Volvo's. K-PAX Performance Cars was officially launched in 2011 with the introduction of a limited run of 25 C30 GT models that were available through select Volvo retailers in North America. Since then the company has produced the special edition S60 GT5, S60 GT6 and V60 GT6. The company continued to grow with over 30 retailers at the end of 2014 before being acquired in January 2017 by Elevate Cars (formerly EVOLVE) of Duarte, Calif.

== Results ==
=== Endurance Races ===
Year	Event	Entrant	No	Drivers	Car	Class	Laps	Pos.	Class Pos.
2017	California 8 Hours	K-PAX Racing	9	(Portugal) Álvaro Parente (United States) Bryan Sellers (United Kingdom) Ben Barnicoat	McLaren 650S GT3	GT3	314	5th	3rd
2016	Sepang 12 Hours	(United States) K-Pax Racing	9	(Portugal) Álvaro Parente (France) Côme Ledogar (New Zealand) Shane van Gisbergen	McLaren 650S GT3	GT3	290	10th	10th
