= Jeff Segal =

American racing driver (born 1985)

Jeffrey Segal
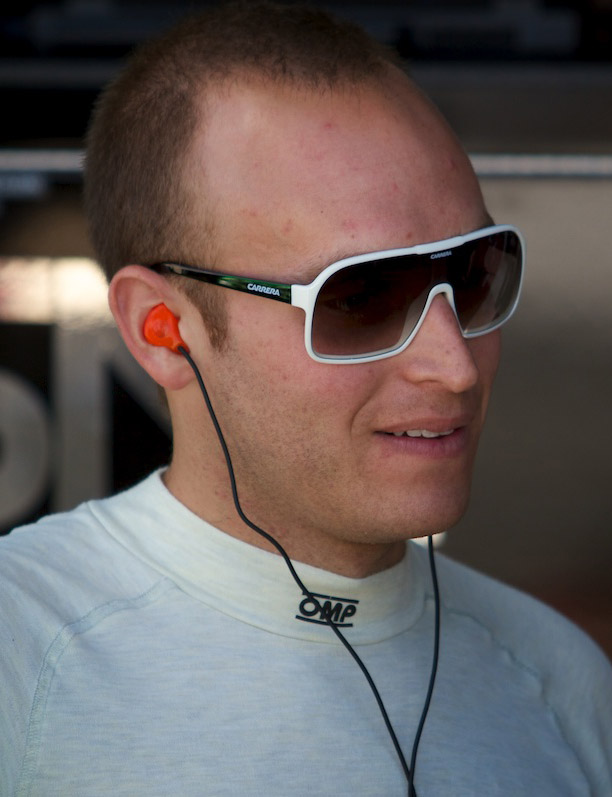
- Segal in March 2012
- Nationality: (United States) American
- Born: Jeffrey Randall Segal; April 27, 1985 (age 41) Philadelphia, Pennsylvania, U.S.
- Categorisation: FIA Silver (until 2016); FIA Gold (2017–)
- Former teams: Level 5 Motorsports, AIM Autosport; SpeedSource, Scuderia Corsa; Michael Shank Racing; AIM Vasser Sullivan, TR3 Racing

Previous series
- WeatherTech SportsCar Championship; American Le Mans Series; Rolex Sports Car Series; Continental Tire Sports Car Challenge; Ferrari Challenge North America

Championship titles
- 2012 2010 2007: Rolex Sports Car Series; Rolex Sports Car Series; Continental Tire SportsCar Challenge

Jeffrey Randall Segal (born April 27, 1985) is an American racing driver. He is a two-time Rolex Sports Car Series GT class champion, a winner of the 2014 24 Hours of Daytona in GT Daytona, and won the GTE Am class at the 2016 24 Hours of Le Mans.

== Early life ==
Jeffrey Randall Segal was born in Philadelphia, Pennsylvania, on April 27, 1985. He attended the University of Miami, where he graduated with a degree in business administration, specializing in entrepreneurship.

== Career ==
=== Ferrari Challenge ===
Segal became the youngest race winner in Ferrari Challenge history at the age of 17. He competed in multiple events prior to becoming a driver coach for a number of teams.

=== Rolex Sports Car Series ===
In 2003, Segal made his series debut, finishing third in the GT class at Virginia International Raceway driving a Ferrari of Washington Ferrari 360 GT.

After making select starts from 2004–07, Segal stepped up to full-time competition in 2008, claiming the GT class pole and win in the Sahlen's Six Hours of The Glen in a SpeedSource Mazda RX-8. He scored seven top-ten finishes that year.

The 2009 season saw continued success, with wins at Watkins Glen and Miller Motorsports Park and one additional podium finish.

In 2010, Segal won the GT Championship with two wins and ten consecutive top-four finishes, as well as a pole position at the Rolex 24 at Daytona. He shared the title with co-driver Emil Assentato in the No. 69 AIM Autosport Mazda RX-8. Segal finished fifth in the GT points standings in 2011, scoring eleven top-ten finishes in the SpeedSource Mazda.

Segal earned his second GT Championship in three years, teaming again with Assentato for three class wins in AIM Autosport's Ferrari 458 Italia Grand Am for the 2012 title. He finished sixth in the GT standings in 2013, which included a class victory at Indianapolis.

=== Continental Tire SportsCar Challenge ===
Segal joined Automatic Racing for two GS races in 2005, prior to an eighth-place finish in the GS points the following year, with three podiums in nine races and a best finish of second.

In 2007, Segal won the CTSC championship with Jep Thorton in an Automatic Racing BMW, becoming the then-youngest series champion at the age of 22, with four podiums and nine top-tens.

The following year, Segal earned his first career victory at Lime Rock Park, having recorded seven top-tens in nine starts.

=== United SportsCar Championship ===
Segal won the 2014 24 Hours of Daytona in the No. 555 Level 5 Motorsports Ferrari 458 Italia GT3 with co-drivers Scott Tucker, Townsend Bell, Bill Sweedler and Alessandro Pier Guidi, despite the car having initially been handed a penalty for late-race avoidable contact. IMSA reversed the call more than four hours after the race, declaring the No. 555 car the winners in GTD.

In 2016, Segal won the 12 Hours of Sebring in GT Daytona with Scuderia Corsa, having qualified the Ferrari 488 GT3 on class pole. That June, he won the GTE Am class at the 2016 24 Hours of Le Mans, sharing the Scuderia Corsa Ferrari 458 Italia with Townsend Bell and Bill Sweedler in the team's second Le Mans appearance.

Segal would switch to Michael Shank Racing in 2017, where he drove an Acura NSX GT3. He has since made starts with AIM Vasser Sullivan, finishing second in GTD at the 2019 24 Hours of Daytona, and with TR3 Racing in 2022.

=== Driver coaching ===
Alongside his racing career, Segal has worked as a driver coach, including with drivers in Ferrari Challenge and SRO SprintX competition. In 2015, he opened GPX Lab, a Miami-based driver development facility built around racing simulators. He later developed GPX Stream, an in car streaming system for remotely watching and coaching from the passenger's seat view.

== Personal life ==
Segal is fluent in French and proficient in Spanish and enjoys biking and shifterkart racing in his free time.

== 24 Hours of Le Mans results ==
Year	Team	Co-Drivers	Car	Class	Laps	Pos.	Class Pos.
2015	(United States) Scuderia Corsa	(United States) Townsend Bell (United States) Bill Sweedler	Ferrari 458 Italia GT2	GTE; Am	330	24th	3rd
2016	(United States) Scuderia Corsa	(United States) Townsend Bell (United States) Bill Sweedler	Ferrari 458 Italia GT2	GTE; Am	331	26th	1st
2018	(United Kingdom) JMW Motorsport	(United Kingdom) Liam Griffin (United States) Cooper MacNeil	Ferrari 488 GTE	GTE; Am	332	30th	5th
2019	(United Kingdom) JMW Motorsport	(Brazil) Rodrigo Baptista (Canada) Wei Lu	Ferrari 488 GTE	GTE; Am	334	32nd	2nd
2020	(United States) WeatherTech Racing	(United States) Cooper MacNeil (Finland) Toni Vilander	Ferrari 488 GTE Evo	GTE; Pro	185	DNF	DNF
2023	(Germany) Walkenhorst Motorsport	(Indonesia) Andrew Haryanto (United States) Chandler Hull	Ferrari 488 GTE Evo	GTE; Am	307	36th	8th

== Complete WeatherTech SportsCar Championship results ==
(key) (Races in bold indicate pole position; results in italics indicate fastest lap)

Year	Team	Class	Make	Engine	1	2	3	4	5	6	7	8	9	10	11	12	Pos.	Points
2014	Level 5 Motorsports	GTD	Ferrari 458 Italia GT3	Ferrari 4.5L V8	DAY; 1												51st	37
2014	AIM Autosport	GTD	Ferrari 458 Italia GT3	Ferrari 4.5L V8		SEB; 2	LGA	BEL	WGL	MOS	IMS	ELK	VIR	AUS	ATL		51st	37
2015	Scuderia Corsa	GTD	Ferrari 458 Italia GT3	Ferrari 4.5L V8	DAY; 6	SEB	LGA	BEL	WGL	LIM	ELK	VIR	AUS	PET; 4			26th	55
2016	Scuderia Corsa	GTD	Ferrari 488 GT3	Ferrari F154CB 3.9 L Turbo V8	DAY; 6	**SEB**; **1**	LGA	BEL	WGL; 1	MOS	LIM	ELK	VIR	AUS	PET; 2		16th	96
2017	Michael Shank Racing w/ Curb Agajanian	GTD	Acura NSX GT3	Acura 3.5 L Turbo V6	DAY; 5	SEB; 8	LBH; 10	AUS; 11	DET; 5	WGL; 16	MOS; 10	LIM; 9	ELK; 14	VIR; 14	LGA; 10	PET; 12	13th	248
2018	Scuderia Corsa	GTD	Ferrari 488 GT3	Ferrari F154CB 3.9 Turbo V8	DAY; 10	SEB	MOH	BEL; 5	WGL; 7	MOS; 8	LIM	ELK	VIR	LGA	PET		23rd	94
2019	AIM Vasser Sullivan	GTD	Lexus RC F GT3	Lexus 5.0 L V8	DAY; 2	SEB	MOH	BEL	WGL	MOS	LIM	ELK	VIR	LGA	ATL		45th	32
2022	TR3 Racing	GTD	Lamborghini Huracán GT3 Evo	Lamborghini 5.2 L V10	DAY; 11	SEB	LBH	LGA	MDO	DET	WGL	MOS	LIM	ELK	VIR	PET	60th	218
