= TR3 Racing =

Auto racing team

- Founded: 2015
- Founder(s): Arthur Romanelli; Oliver Romanelli; Gregory Romanelli
- Base: Davie, Florida
- Current series: Lamborghini Super Trofeo North America
- Former series: IMSA SportsCar Championship; GT World Challenge America; Pirelli World Challenge
- Current drivers: (United States) Elias De La Torre IV (New Zealand) Will Bamber (United States) Conrad Geis (United States) Jason Hart (Canada) Dean Neuls (Canada) Sam Shi (United States) Matteo Siderman (United States) Michael Johnson

TR3 Racing is an American sports car racing team that currently competes in Lamborghini Super Trofeo North America and GT World Challenge America, fielding a Mercedes-AMG GT3 Evo. The Team was founded in 2015 by the Romanelli Brothers.

== History ==
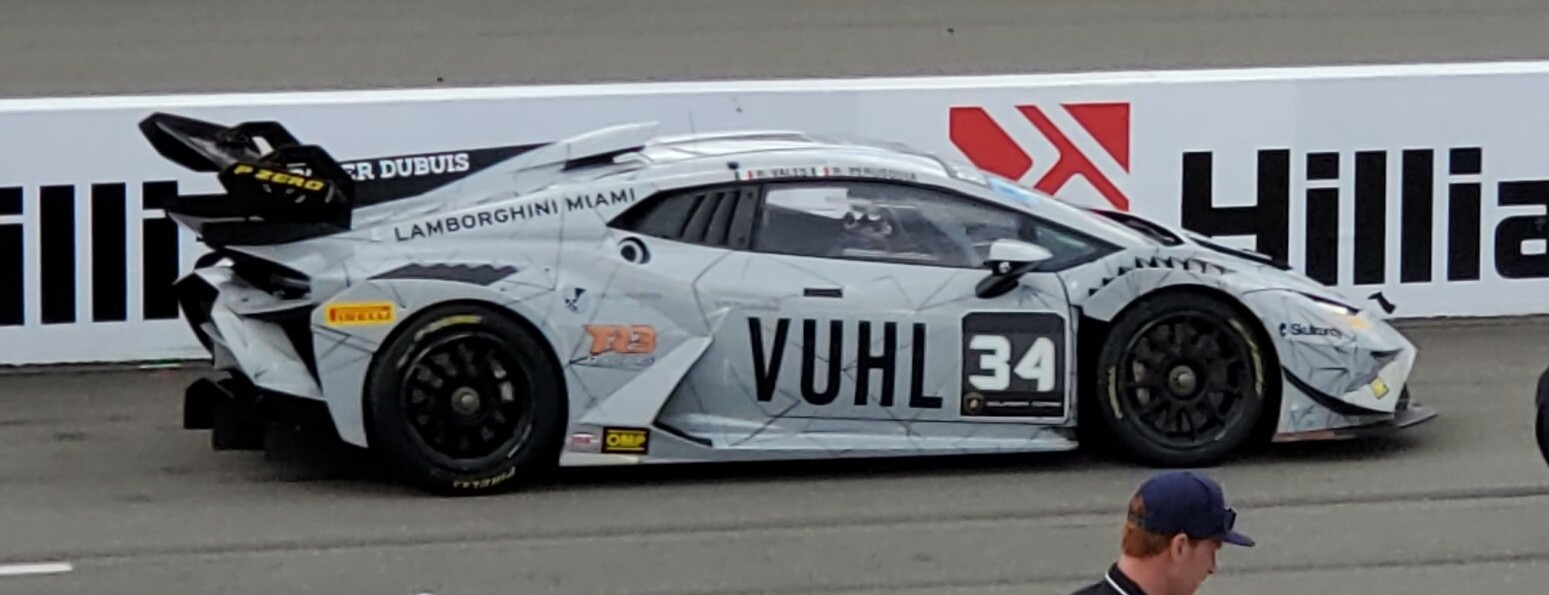
Lamborghini Huracán Super Trofeo of Rodrigo Vales and Rogelio Perusquia at Watkins Glen in 2022.

TR3 Racing was founded in 2015 as the motorsports arm of TR3 Performance, an aftermarket tuning operation based out of South Florida.

The team began in the Ferrari Challenge North America Series and has since competed across multiple American Series.

=== GT World Challenge America ===
In 2017, the team began competing in the Pirelli World Challenge, fielding a Ferrari 488 GT3 for Daniel Mancinelli. Entering the Pro class, Mancinelli was paired with co-drivers Andrea Montermini and Niccolò Schirò for the SprintX events. Claiming three victories and five overall podiums, Mancinelli finished fourth in the overall GT-class championship. TR3 returned in 2018, alternating their Sprint and SprintX lineups. Wei Lu and Jeff Segal piloted the team's Ferrari in the longer SprintX events, while Mancinelli continued in his solo-driver duties for the other half of the season. However, Mancinelli would miss the opening round at St. Petersburg, as the team withdrew citing unfavorable BoP. TR3 had entered the updated 2018 model, which received a 20 kilogram weight increase over the 2017 edition of the 488 GT3. Although team principal Gregory Romanelli threatened to pull the entry from additional events later in the year, both TR3 cars completed the entire 2018 season in their respective championships. Mancinelli's one win, at Long Beach, and four podiums were the team's only podium finishes of the season. TR3 also began collaborating with Squadra Corse Garage Italia, as the latter's driver lineup of Caesar Bacarella and Martin Fuentes claimed the GTA class championship in both Sprint and SprintX competition.

For 2019, the team continued their partnership with Squadra Corse Garage Italia, fielding a pair of entries in the rebranded GT World Challenge America. The TR3-branded entry secured one class victory in the four races it entered, taking the Pro-Am Cup victory in the first race at Circuit of the Americas. The Squadra Corse-branded entry, piloted by Martin Fuentes, claimed the Am-class title.

In 2023, the team shifted to competing with Mercedes-AMG machinery in the series. The program's early stages were primarily led by Mercedes-affiliated driver Daniel Morad, who competed alongside gentleman driver Ziad Ghandour. As the team was switching from the mid-engine Lamborghini Huracán GT3 to the front-engine Mercedes-AMG GT3, Morad described preparations for the opening weekend at Sonoma as a "crash course" for the operation, with few similarities to draw between the two cars.

=== IMSA SportsCar Championship ===
For the 2022 24 Hours of Daytona, TR3 fielded Lamborghini's sole GTD Pro-class entry, receiving full factory support from the Italian marque. The #63 entry was piloted by Mirko Bortolotti, Andrea Caldarelli, Marco Mapelli, and Rolf Ineichen. The entry would take pole through a class victory in the 100-minute qualifying race, but would retire from the 24-hour event and finish 12th in GTD Pro. The team would return to the GTD Pro class for the 2022 12 Hours of Sebring, finishing second in class.

=== Lamborghini Super Trofeo North America ===
In TR3 Racing's most recent campaign, the team earned the 2025 Pro AM Championship win in the Lamborghini Super Trofeo North America Series with Drivers of the No.67 Conrad Geis and Jason Hart. The team also accomplished the Overall Vice Championship World Title and North America Title with Drivers Elias De La Torre IV and Will Bamber in the No.29.

The 2024 Lamborghini Super Trofeo North America season marked another competitive year for TR3 Racing, culminating in their championship win in the Pro class. The season consisted of six rounds, beginning on March 13 at Sebring International Raceway and concluding on November 15 with the World Final at Circuito de Jerez - Ángel Nieto.

Throughout the season, TR3 Racing demonstrated strong performance, with Ernie Francis Jr. and Giano Taurino securing multiple wins at Sebring, Watkins Glen, and Circuit of the Americas, ultimately leading them to the Pro class championship.
