= 2018 F4 Chinese Championship =

Motor racing competition

The 2018 F4 Chinese Championship (Shell Cup FIA F4 Chinese Championship) was the fourth season of the F4 Chinese Championship. It began on 13 May at the Ningbo International Circuit and finished on 14 October at the same place after seven triple header rounds, all of them co-hosted with the China Formula Grand Prix championship.

== Teams and drivers ==
Team	Drivers	Rounds
(Hong Kong) BlackArts Racing Team	(Singapore) Daim Hishammudin	1−5, 7
(Hong Kong) BlackArts Racing Team	(Macau) Charles Leong	6
(Hong Kong) BlackArts Racing Team	(China) Stephen Hong	6
(Hong Kong) BlackArts Racing Team	(United Kingdom) Daniel Wells	6
(Hong Kong) BlackArts Racing Team	(China) Daniel Cao	1−2
(Hong Kong) BlackArts Racing Team	(South Korea) Minjae Kang	5
(Hong Kong) BlackArts Racing Team	(Chinese Taipei) Oscar Lee	3
(Hong Kong) BAR Motorsports	(Chinese Taipei) Oscar Lee	2
(China) FFA Racing	(China) Zheng Wancheng	All
(China) FFA Racing	(Canada) Maxx Ebenal	7
(China) FFA Racing	(China) Xi Xiuping	1−2
(China) FFA Racing	(China) Long Lingyun	5
(China) FFA Racing	(France) Jean-Karl Vernay	6
(China) FFA Racing	(China) Huang Jianchen	7
(China) FFA Racing	(China) Jing Zefeng	3
(China) Freely Racing Team	(China) George Chen	1−5, 7
(China) Freely Racing Team	(China) He Xixi	5
(China) Freely Racing Team	(Italy) Federico Malvestiti	5
(China) Freely Racing Team	(Belgium) Frédéric Vervisch	6
(China) Freely Racing Team	(China) Dai Linghao	1−4, 7
(China) Freely Racing Team	(United Kingdom) Gordon Shedden	6
(China) Hi-Tiger	(China) Shang Zongyi	All
(China) Hi-Tiger	(China) Tai Yi	All
(China) Hi-Tiger	(China) Gu Xiaogang	4−5
(China) Henmax Motorsport	(China) Han Yingfu	1−4, 7
(China) Karging League	(China) Luo Yufeng	All
(China) Karging League	(China) Eric Sun	1−3
(China) Karging League	(China) Han Songting	6
(Republic of Ireland) Pinnacle Motorsport	(Republic of Ireland) Jordan Dempsey	2−7
(China) Pute Racing	(China) Feng Diyang	2
(China) Smart Life Racing Team	(China) He Zijian	All
(China) Smart Life Racing Team	(China) Lü Yiyu	1, 3−4, 6−7
(China) Smart Life Racing Team	(China) Lü Jingxi	2, 5
(China) Start Sports Racing	(China) Su Yanming	1−2
(China) Start Sports Racing	(China) Lin Lifeng	1

== Race calendar and results ==
All rounds will be held in China.

Round		Circuit	Date	Pole position	Fastest lap	Winning driver	Winning team	Supporting
1	R1	Ningbo International Circuit, Ningbo	12 May	(China) Daniel Cao	(China) Daniel Cao	(China) Daniel Cao	(Hong Kong) BlackArts Racing Team	China Formula Grand Prix
1	R2	Ningbo International Circuit, Ningbo	13 May		(China) Daniel Cao	(China) Daniel Cao	(Hong Kong) BlackArts Racing Team	China Formula Grand Prix
1	R3	Ningbo International Circuit, Ningbo	13 May		(China) Daniel Cao	(China) Daniel Cao	(Hong Kong) BlackArts Racing Team	China Formula Grand Prix
2	R1	Zhuhai International Circuit, Zhuhai	2 June	(Singapore) Daim Hishammudin	(Singapore) Daim Hishammudin	(Singapore) Daim Hishammudin	(Hong Kong) BlackArts Racing Team	China Formula Grand Prix
2	R2	Zhuhai International Circuit, Zhuhai	3 June		(Singapore) Daim Hishammudin	(Singapore) Daim Hishammudin	(Hong Kong) BlackArts Racing Team	China Formula Grand Prix
2	R3	Zhuhai International Circuit, Zhuhai	3 June		(Republic of Ireland) Jordan Dempsey	(Singapore) Daim Hishammudin	(Hong Kong) BlackArts Racing Team	China Formula Grand Prix
3	R1	Chengdu Goldenport Circuit, Chengdu	21 July	(Singapore) Daim Hishammudin	(Republic of Ireland) Jordan Dempsey	(Republic of Ireland) Jordan Dempsey	(Republic of Ireland) Pinnacle Motorsport	China Formula Grand Prix
3	R2	Chengdu Goldenport Circuit, Chengdu	22 July		(Republic of Ireland) Jordan Dempsey	(Republic of Ireland) Jordan Dempsey	(Republic of Ireland) Pinnacle Motorsport	China Formula Grand Prix
3	R3	Chengdu Goldenport Circuit, Chengdu	22 July		(Republic of Ireland) Jordan Dempsey	(Republic of Ireland) Jordan Dempsey	(Republic of Ireland) Pinnacle Motorsport	China Formula Grand Prix
4	R1	Ningbo International Circuit, Ningbo	1 September	(Republic of Ireland) Jordan Dempsey	(Republic of Ireland) Jordan Dempsey	(Republic of Ireland) Jordan Dempsey	(Republic of Ireland) Pinnacle Motorsport	Audi R8 LMS Cup; 2018 F3 Asian Championship; China Formula Grand Prix; TCR China Touring Car Championship
4	R2	Ningbo International Circuit, Ningbo	2 September		(Republic of Ireland) Jordan Dempsey	(Republic of Ireland) Jordan Dempsey	(Republic of Ireland) Pinnacle Motorsport	Audi R8 LMS Cup; 2018 F3 Asian Championship; China Formula Grand Prix; TCR China Touring Car Championship
4	R3	Ningbo International Circuit, Ningbo	2 September		(Republic of Ireland) Jordan Dempsey	(China) Shang Zongyi	(China) Hi-Tiger	Audi R8 LMS Cup; 2018 F3 Asian Championship; China Formula Grand Prix; TCR China Touring Car Championship
5	R1	Shanghai International Circuit, Shanghai	22 September	(Republic of Ireland) Jordan Dempsey	(Republic of Ireland) Jordan Dempsey	(Republic of Ireland) Jordan Dempsey	(Republic of Ireland) Pinnacle Motorsport	Blancpain GT Series Asia; 2018 F3 Asian Championship; China Formula Grand Prix
5	R2	Shanghai International Circuit, Shanghai	23 September		(China) Luo Yufeng	(Republic of Ireland) Jordan Dempsey	(Republic of Ireland) Pinnacle Motorsport	Blancpain GT Series Asia; 2018 F3 Asian Championship; China Formula Grand Prix
5	R3	Shanghai International Circuit, Shanghai	23 September		(China) He Zijian	(China) He Zijian	(China) Smart Life Racing	Blancpain GT Series Asia; 2018 F3 Asian Championship; China Formula Grand Prix
6	R1	Wuhan Street Circuit, Wuhan	4 October	(China) Zheng Wancheng	(Republic of Ireland) Jordan Dempsey	(Macau) Charles Leong	(Hong Kong) BlackArts Racing Team	2018 World Touring Car Cup; China Formula Grand Prix
6	R2	Wuhan Street Circuit, Wuhan	4 October		(Republic of Ireland) Jordan Dempsey	(Macau) Charles Leong	(Hong Kong) BlackArts Racing Team	2018 World Touring Car Cup; China Formula Grand Prix
6	R3	Wuhan Street Circuit, Wuhan	5 October		(Republic of Ireland) Jordan Dempsey	(China) Shang Zongyi	(China) Hi-Tiger	2018 World Touring Car Cup; China Formula Grand Prix
7	R1	Ningbo International Circuit, Ningbo	13 October	(Republic of Ireland) Jordan Dempsey	(Republic of Ireland) Jordan Dempsey	(Republic of Ireland) Jordan Dempsey	(Republic of Ireland) Pinnacle Motorsport	Blancpain GT Series Asia; 2018 F3 Asian Championship; China Formula Grand Prix
7	R2	Ningbo International Circuit, Ningbo	14 October		(Republic of Ireland) Jordan Dempsey	(Canada) Maxx Ebenal	(China) FFA Racing	Blancpain GT Series Asia; 2018 F3 Asian Championship; China Formula Grand Prix
7	R3	Ningbo International Circuit, Ningbo	14 October		(Republic of Ireland) Jordan Dempsey	(Singapore) Daim Hishammudin	(Hong Kong) BlackArts Racing Team	Blancpain GT Series Asia; 2018 F3 Asian Championship; China Formula Grand Prix

== Championship standings ==
Points were awarded as follows:

Position	**1st**	**2nd**	**3rd**	**4th**	**5th**	**6th**	**7th**	**8th**	**9th**	**10th**
Points	25	18	15	12	10	8	6	4	2	1

=== Drivers' Championship ===
Pos	Driver	NIC1			ZIC			CGC			NIC2			SIC			WUH			NIC3			Pts
1	(Republic of Ireland) Jordan Dempsey				Ret	2	2	1	1	1	**1**	1	2	**1**	1	Ret	Ret	4	2	**1**	2	3	320
2	(China) Luo Yufeng	3	2	3	3	Ret	9	6	4	2	2	3	4	2	2	DSQ	2	3	3	6	6	4	270
3	(Singapore) Daim Hishammudin	2	3	5	**1**	1	1	**2**	2	Ret	3	2	5	8	12	Ret				3	3	1	256
4	(China) Shang Zongyi	4	5	6	5	3	3	5	3	5	6	8	1	5	3	3	Ret	8	1	7	5	7	237
5	(China) Zheng Wancheng	6	8	2	7	6	8	3	5	3	4	4	3	3	4	2	**Ret**	6	6	4	4	2	236
6	(China) He Zijian	5	4	7	4	Ret	7	4	6	Ret	5	5	7	7	8	1	4	7	Ret	5	7	6	176
7	(China) Daniel Cao	**1**	1	1	2	9	5																105
8	(China) Tai Yi	Ret	7	8	8	Ret	12	10	Ret	6	7	7	8	9	6	10	5	Ret	7	Ret	8	Ret	74
9	(United Kingdom) Daniel Wells																3	2	5				55
10	(Canada) Maxx Ebenal																			2	1	5	53
11	(China) George Chen	10	9	9	10	5	11	Ret	10	9	9	6	6	10	9	4				DSQ	DNS	Ret	52
12	(Taiwan) Oscar Lee				6	4	6	8	7	4													50
13	(South Korea) Minjae Kang													4	5	5							32
14	(China) Eric Sun	11	11	12	9	8	4	7	9	7													32
15	(China) Lü Yiyu	14	14	15				11	11	Ret	11	11	Ret				7	9	9	8	10	Ret	27
16	(China) Xi Xiuping	7	6	10	11	7	10																22
17	(China) Han Songting																8	10	10				16
18	(China) Su Yanming	9	10	4	12	DSQ	13																15
19	(China) Long Lingyun													11	7	6							14
20	(China) Jing Zefeng							9	8	8													10
21	(China) Gu Xiaogang										8	9	9	Ret	11	9							10
22	(Italy) Federico Malvestiti													6	Ret	DNS							8
23	(China) Huang Jianchen																			10	9	8	7
24	(China) He Xixi													12	Ret	7							6
25	(China) Lü Jingxi				Ret	10	16							13	10	8							6
26	(China) Han Yingfu	12	15	14	15	12	17	12	Ret	10	12	12	11							9	11	9	5
27	(China) Lin Lifeng	8	12	11																			4
28	(China) Dai Linghao	13	13	13	14	Ret	15	Ret	Ret	DNS	10	10	10							Ret	Ret	Ret	3
29	(China) Feng Diyang				13	11	14																0
30	(France) Jean-Karl Vernay																Ret	Ret	DNS				0
	(China) Stephen Hong																WD	WD	WD				0
Guest drivers ineligible for championship points
	(Macau) Charles Leong																1	1	4				0
	(Belgium) Frédéric Vervisch																6	5	8				0
	(United Kingdom) Gordon Shedden																Ret	Ret	DNS				0
Pos	Driver	NIC1			ZIC			CGC			NIC2			SIC			WUH			NIC3			Pts

Colour	Result
Gold	Winner
Silver	Second place
Bronze	Third place
Green	Points classification
Blue	Non-points classification
Blue	Non-classified finish (NC)
Purple	Retired, not classified (Ret)
Red	Did not qualify (DNQ)
Red	Did not pre-qualify (DNPQ)
Black	Disqualified (DSQ)
White	Did not start (DNS)
White	Withdrew (WD)
White	Race cancelled (C)
Blank	Did not practice (DNP)
Blank	Did not arrive (DNA)
Blank	Excluded (EX)

**Bold** – Pole
Italics – Fastest Lap

=== Teams' Cup ===
Pos	Team	Points
1	(Hong Kong) BlackArts Racing Team	478
2	(China) FFA Racing	335
3	(Republic of Ireland) Pinnacle Motorsport	320
4	(China) Karging League	318
5	(China) Hi-Tiger	311
6	(China) Smart Life Racing Team	209
7	(China) Freely Racing Team	61
8	(Hong Kong) BAR Motorsports	28
9	(China) Start Sports Racing	27
10	(China) Henmax Motorsport	5
11	(China) Pute Racing	0
