= Pinnacle Motorsport (Filipino auto racing team) =

Irish-Filipino auto Racing Team

(Philippines) (Republic of Ireland) Pinnacle Motorsport
- Founded: 2016
- Base: Manila, Philippines (HQ); Sepang International Circuit, Malaysia; Zhuhai International Circuit, China (operations)
- Team principal(s): John O'Hara
- Current series: Formula 4 UAE Championship; F4 Spanish Championship
- Former series: Formula Masters China; F4 Chinese Championship; Asian Le Mans Series; Formula Regional Asian Championship
- Current drivers: F4 UAE Championship (United Kingdom) Rowan Campbell-Pilling (China) Sun Anzhe (Japan) Ryusho Nakazato; Vladimir Verkholantsev (United States) Kaylee Countryman
- Drivers' Championships: Formula Masters China: 2017: Taylor Cockerton; China Formula 4 Championship: 2018: Jordan Dempsey
- Website: https://www.pinnaclemotorsport.net/

Pinnacle Motorsport (formerly PRT Racing) is an Irish licensed, Philippines based motor racing team founded in 2016 by Irish former racers John O'Hara and Gary Thompson. Both have experience at Formula 3 level, the former a race winner in the Asian Formula Three series, and had tested for the A1 Team Ireland, the latter featuring in the Japanese F3 and 2013 F3 European series. While the team began using the PRT Racing name in the 2016 Formula Masters China series and 2016-17 Asian Le Mans Series sprint and endurance LMP3 events, they adopted the Pinnacle Motorsport name from the 2017 season onward. Further involvement in open wheel racing came in China F4 and F3 Asian series. However, both prior to their official formation and throughout their continued operations, Pinnacle have partnered with KCMG to operate many of their motorsport programs across Asia including the Blancpain GT Series Asia GT3Am, Audi R8 LMS Cup, FRD LMP3 Series, Asian Le Mans Series, Asian Formula Renault Series, and the aforementioned Formula Masters China series. A similar partnership also existed in F3 Asia with B-Max Racing.

== History ==
=== Formula Masters China ===
For the inaugural season using their own name, the team ran as Cebu Pacific Air by PRT, with three cars initially announced for the first round of the 2016 season driven by Kim Jeong-tae, Nick Rowe and "Jeffrey" Ye Junhui. They would take all 3 victories at the opening round at Shanghai, as well as further podium appearances at Zuhai, Buriram and Sepang. Rowe would only partake in the opening round due to illness and scheduling conflicts, being partially replaced by Thomas Swift, and Ye would leave after the two Chinese rounds, leaving Kim Jeong Tae as the team's only full time driver. He would achieve three more podiums at the final round at Penbay, ending the season 4th in the drivers championship and 2nd in the team's championship, before tragically losing his life in road accident in South Korea.

The 2017 season would see the rebrand to Pinnacle Motorsport, retaining the Cebu Pacific Air sponsorship, and again beginning the season with three cars piloted by Taylor Cockerton, Antolin Gonzales, and Ben Grimes. Cockerton started the season strongly at the first Sepang round with a win and two podiums, and was a consistent podium finisher throughout the second Sepang and both Zuhai rounds, whereas Grimes and Gonzales were often point scorers, the former also grabbing a double podium at Zhuhai. Gonzales would not return for the second Zhuhai round, and a three car entry was restored for the Shanghai finale with the addition of "Billy" Zheng Jiannian. Here, Cockerton clinched the driver's title, winning three out of the four races that weekend as well as four fastest laps and two poles, to overturn his closest rival Daniel Lu by a margin of three points.

=== Asian Le Mans ===
PRT Racing entered into both the 2016 Asian Le Mans Sprint Cup, and the 2016-17 Endurance Series, with team owner Ate de Jong and Ginetta factory driver Charlie Robertson driving the #67 Ginetta in the LMP3 category. In the three rounds and six races held at Sepang in the Sprint Cup, the team achieved a win and two other podiums, finishing 2nd in the LMP3 standings. The same car and driver lineup was retained for the Endurance Series, with the addition of Martin Rump for the first two rounds. The team would not have much success, with a retirement at Zuhai, points finishes at Fuji and Buriram, before another retirement in the final round at Sepang ended their campaign.

=== China Formula 4 Championship ===
Having contested the first round of the 2018 US F4 Championship with two retirements and a DNS, Jordan Dempsey made the switch to China F4 with Pinnacle Motorsport. Despite another retirement in Race 1, he achieved two second place finishes at Zuhai, before going on a run of seven wins in nine races at Chengdu, Ningbo and Shanghai. Points and a podium at Wuhan, before another win and two podiums at the final round back at Ningbo sealed the driver's title by 50 points even after missing the first round.

=== F3 Asian Championship ===
Following the replacement of the Formula Masters China series with the F3 Asian Championship, Pinnacle were one of several teams to sign up for the inaugural season in 2018. The team announced Daniel Cao for the first round at Sepang, as well as collaborating with B-Max Racing to provide a car for "Dragon". This collaboration would continue at Shanghai and again at the final round returning to Sepang, where he was joined by Tairoku Yamaguchi, as well as Liam Lawson driving the Pinnacle team branded car. Lawson would take the final round’s three wins, and the team would finish 5th in the standings.

In 2019, F3 Asia ran two championships, the winter series and the main championship in the summer. Pinnacle’s line up for the former was David Schumacher, Amaury Cordeel and Akash Nandy. Schumacher and Cordeel would leave after the second round, being replaced by Victor Martins and Christian Lundgaard. Season highlights included a Schumacher podium at Buriram, and two podiums for guest driver Martins at Sepang ending up 3rd in the team standings. The relationship with B-Max and "Dragon" continued, alongside Tairoku Yamaguchi, as well as Motoyoshi Yoshida and Miki Koyama.

The summer series line-up consisted of the team’s Chinese F4 champion Jordan Dempsey and Tommy Smith, with Ayrton Simmons replacing Dempsey for round 2 and driving alongside him in round 4. Highlights for Dempsey would be two podiums at Suzuka and Shanghai to finish 7th in the standings, along with the points finishes of Simmons and Smith to help the team to 4th in the teams’ championship.

With F3 Asia fully committing to a winter series format for 2019-20, the team contested the season with 2019 Summer series runner up Jack Doohan and Pietro Fittipaldi as full time drivers. Sebastián Fernández would appear in the third car at both UAE rounds, and Dominic Ang entered for the fourth round at Sepang. Doohan would pick up a win at Sepang and Dubai, as well as all three wins at the second visit to Sepang, ultimately finishing as championship runner up. Fernandez also had success in his brief time with the team, taking two podiums in Dubai and a race win in Abu Dhabi, Fittipaldi was a consistent point scorer, clinching 5th, and Ang retired and failed to start in his entered races. For the 2021 season, all rounds were held in the UAE because of travel restrictions put in place due to the COVID-19 pandemic. The lineup for the condensed season would be rookies Pierre-Louis Chovet, Alexandre Bardinon and Matthias Lüthen, and returning to the championship to join Pinnacle would be Alessio Deledda. Chovet would be the surprise package of the series, picking up 6 wins and finishing 2nd in the standings. Deledda would record two points finishes, both at Dubai, whereas Bardinon and Lüthen did not score.

=== F4 Spanish Championship ===
For the 2021 season, Pinnacle announced they were joining the F4 Spanish Championship grid with Alex Dunne. Together, they achieved a pole and podium in their opening weekend at Spa, though prior to round 4 Dunne announced he had parted ways with both Pinnacle and KCMG due to circumstances beyond his control.

== Current series results ==
=== Formula Regional Middle East Championship ===
Year	Car	Drivers	Races	Wins	Poles	F.Laps	Podiums	Points	D.C.	T.C.
2023	Tatuus F3 T-318	(Spain) Pepe Martí	12	2	0	0	2	79	7th	4th
2023	Tatuus F3 T-318	(Mexico) Rafael Villagómez	12	0	0	0	1	44	13th	4th
2023	Tatuus F3 T-318	(Thailand) Tasanapol Inthraphuvasak	14	0	0	0	1	19	19th	4th
2023	Tatuus F3 T-318	(Netherlands) Niels Koolen	15	0	0	0	0	0	31st	4th
2023	Tatuus F3 T-318	(Japan) Ayato Iwasaki	3	0	0	0	0	0	37th	4th
2024	Tatuus F3 T-318	(Spain) Mari Boya	15	0	0	2	3	112	5th	4th
2024	Tatuus F3 T-318	(Kazakhstan) Alexander Abkhazava	15	0	0	0	0	20	15th	4th
2024	Tatuus F3 T-318	(Italy) Giovanni Maschio	15	0	0	0	0	2	21st	4th
2024	Tatuus F3 T-318	(United Kingdom) Finley Green	11	0	0	0	0	0	34th	4th
2025	Tatuus F3 T-318	(Mexico) Ernesto Rivera	15	0	0	0	1	101	9th	6th
2025	Tatuus F3 T-318	(Mexico) Jesse Carrasquedo Jr.	9	0	0	0	1	41	15th	6th
2025	Tatuus F3 T-318	(Japan) Hiyu Yamakoshi	9	0	0	0	0	29	16th	6th
2025	Tatuus F3 T-318	(Italy) Giovanni Maschio	6	0	0	0	0	1	23rd	6th
2025	Tatuus F3 T-318	(China) Yuanpu Cui	6	0	0	0	0	0	28th	6th
2025	Tatuus F3 T-318	(United Kingdom) Finley Green	15	0	0	0	0	0	33rd	6th
2026	Tatuus T-326	(United Arab Emirates) August Raber	12	0	0	0	0	0	36th	6th
2026	Tatuus T-326	(United States) Alex Powell	12	0	1	1	3	76	4th	6th

=== Formula Trophy UAE ===
Year	Car	Drivers	Races	Wins	Poles	F.Laps	Podiums	Points	D.C.
2024	Tatuus F4-T421	(Sweden) Gustav Jonsson	7	1	0	0	3	66	4th
2024	Tatuus F4-T421	(Italy) Davide Larini	3	0	0	0	0	10	15th
2024	Tatuus F4-T421	(China) Wang Yuzhe	7	0	0	0	0	0	22nd
2025	Tatuus F4-T421	(Italy) Niccolò Maccagnani	7	0	0	0	2	78	2nd
2025	Tatuus F4-T421	(South Africa) Jorden Moodley	7	0	0	0	0	0	34th
2025	Tatuus F4-T421	(Malaysia) Putera Hani Imran	7	0	0	0	0	0	25th
2025	Tatuus F4-T421	(United States) Kaylee Countryman	4	0	0	0	0	0	29th

=== Formula 4 UAE Championship / F4 Middle East Championship / UAE4 Series ===
Year	Car	Drivers	Races	Wins	Poles	F.Laps	Podiums	Points	D.C.	T.C.
2022	Tatuus F4-T421	(Netherlands) Robert de Haan	12	0	0	0	0	0	30th	12th
2022	Tatuus F4-T421	(Belgium) Jules Castro	8	0	0	0	0	0	33rd	12th
2022	Tatuus F4-T421	(Belgium) Jef Machiels	12	0	0	0	0	0	39th	12th
2023	Tatuus F4-T421	(Italy) Brando Badoer	9	0	0	1	1	69	6th	6th
2023	Tatuus F4-T421	(Philippines) Hiyu Yamakoshi	6	0	0	0	0	8	22nd	6th
2023	Tatuus F4-T421	(Australia) Jack Beeton	15	0	0	0	0	6	23rd	6th
2023	Tatuus F4-T421	(United Kingdom) Kai Daryanani	15	0	0	0	0	0	36th	6th
2024	Tatuus F4-T421	(United Kingdom) Kai Daryanani	15	0	0	0	0	2	25th	10th
2024	Tatuus F4-T421	(Japan) Hiyu Yamakoshi	3	0	0	0	0	0	32nd	10th
2024	Tatuus F4-T421	(China) Yuhao Fu	15	0	0	0	0	0	37th	10th
2025	Tatuus F4-T421	(South Korea) Kyuho Lee	6	0	0	0	0	4	20th	8th
2025	Tatuus F4-T421	(Japan) Yuta Suzuki†	12	0	0	0	0	2	22nd	8th
2025	Tatuus F4-T421	(Kyrgyzstan) Georgy Zhuravskiy	3	0	0	0	0	0	28th	8th
2025	Tatuus F4-T421	(China) Wang Yuzhe	15	0	0	0	0	0	29th	8th
2026	Tatuus F4-T421	(United Kingdom) Rowan Campbell-Pilling	12	0	0	0	1	24	13th	9th
2026	Tatuus F4-T421	Vladimir Verkholantsev	9	0	0	0	0	0	29th	9th
2026	Tatuus F4-T421	(Japan) Ryusho Nakazato	12	0	0	0	0	0	36th	9th
2026	Tatuus F4-T421	(China) Sun Anzhe	6	0	0	0	0	0	42nd	9th
2026	Tatuus F4-T421	(United States) Kaylee Countryman	9	0	0	0	0	0	45th	9th

† Suzuki drove for Akcel GP / PHM Racing from round 3 onwards.

=== Formula 4 South East Asia Championship ===
Year	Car	Drivers	Races	Wins	Poles	F.Laps	Podiums	Points	D.C.	T.C.
2023	Tatuus F4-T421	(India) Kai Daryanani	6	0	0	0	1	36	10th	7th
2023	Tatuus F4-T421	(Hong Kong) Liu Kaishun	6	0	0	0	0	20	17th	7th
2023	Tatuus F4-T421	(China) Yuhao Fu	6	0	0	0	0	10	23rd	7th
2023	Tatuus F4-T421	(Japan) "Dragon"	3	0	0	0	0	2	27th	10th (Note: Entered as B-Max Racing Team)
2025	Tatuus F4-T421	(Italy) Niccolò Maccagnani	6	3	3	3	6	158	4th	3rd
2025	Tatuus F4-T421	(Singapore) Kareen Kaur	3	0	0	0	0	7	16th	3rd

== Former series results ==
=== Formula Masters China ===
Year	Car	Drivers	Races	Wins	Poles	F.Laps	Podiums	Points	D.C.	T.C.
2016	Tatuus FA010	(South Korea) Kim Jeong Tae	18	1	1	1	8	134	4th	2nd
2016	Tatuus FA010	(Australia) Nick Rowe	3	2	2	1	2	38	9th	2nd
2016	Tatuus FA010	(China) 'Jeffrey' Ye Junhui	6	0	0	0	1	34	10th	2nd
2016	Tatuus FA010	(Hong Kong) Thomas Swift	9	0	0	0	0	8	11th	2nd
2017	Tatuus FA010	(New Zealand) Taylor Cockerton	18	5	4	5	13	221	1st	2nd
2017	Tatuus FA010	(Philippines) Ben Grimes	18	0	0	0	2	75	8th	2nd
2017	Tatuus FA010	(Spain) Antolín González	11	0	0	0	0	27	11th	2nd
2017	Tatuus FA010	(China) 'Billy' Zheng Jiannian	4	0	0	0	0	6	14th	2nd

=== Asian Le Mans ===
==== Sprint Cup ====
Year	Entrant	No.	Class	Car	Drivers	SEP1		SEP2		SEP3		Points	Team Pos.
2016	(Philippines) PRT Racing	67	LMP3	Ginetta-Juno P3-15	(Netherlands) Ate de Jong (United Kingdom) Charlie Robertson	3	4	3	1	4	Ret	86	2nd

==== Endurance Series ====
Year	Entrant	No.	Class	Car	Drivers	ZHU	FUJ	CHA	SEP	Points	Team Pos.
2016–17	(Philippines) PRT Racing	67	LMP3	Ginetta-Juno P3-15	(Netherlands) Ate de Jong (United Kingdom) Charlie Robertson (Estonia) Martin Rump (1-2)	Ret	5	4	Ret	22	8

=== F4 Chinese Championship ===
Year	Car	Drivers	Races	Wins	Poles	F.Laps	Podiums	Points	D.C.	T.C.
2018	Mygale M14-F4	(Republic of Ireland) Jordan Dempsey	18	8	3	14	14	320	1st	2nd

=== F3 Asian Winter Series ===
Year	Car	Drivers	Races	Wins	Poles	F.Laps	Podiums	Points	D.C.	T.C.
2019	Tatuus F3 T-318	(Malaysia) Akash Nandy	9	0	0	0	0	62	7th	3rd
2019	Tatuus F3 T-318	(Germany) David Schumacher	6	0	0	0	1	43	8th	3rd
2019	Tatuus F3 T-318	(Belgium) Amaury Cordeel	6	0	0	0	0	22	10th	3rd
2019	Tatuus F3 T-318	(France) Victor Martins	3	0	0	0	2	0	NC†	3rd
2019	Tatuus F3 T-318	(Denmark) Christian Lundgaard	3	0	0	0	0	0	NC†	3rd

^{†} As Martins and Lundgaard were guest drivers, they were ineligible for points.

=== F3 Asian Championship/Formula Regional Asian Championship ===
Year	Car	Drivers	Races	Wins	Poles	F.Laps	Podiums	Points	D.C.	T.C.
2018	Tatuus F3 T-318	(New Zealand) Liam Lawson	3	3	2	3	3	75	8th	5th
2018	Tatuus F3 T-318	(China) Daniel Cao	3	0	0	0	0	7	19th	5th
2019	Tatuus F3 T-318	(Republic of Ireland) Jordan Dempsey	12	0	0	0	2	83	7th	4th
2019	Tatuus F3 T-318	(United Kingdom) Ayrton Simmons	6	0	0	0	0	40	10th	4th
2019	Tatuus F3 T-318	(Australia) Tommy Smith	15	0	0	0	0	11	18th	4th
2019-20	Tatuus F3 T-318	(Australia) Jack Doohan	15	5	4	5	10	229	2nd	2nd
2019-20	Tatuus F3 T-318	(Brazil) Pietro Fittipaldi	15	0	0	0	1	119	5th	2nd
2019-20	Tatuus F3 T-318	(Spain) Sebastián Fernández	6	1	1	1	2	96	8th	2nd
2019-20	Tatuus F3 T-318	(Malaysia) Dominic Ang	1	0	0	0	0	0	NC	2nd
2021	Tatuus F3 T-318	(France) Pierre-Louis Chovet	15	6	2	3	7	241	2nd	4th
2021	Tatuus F3 T-318	(Italy) Alessio Deledda	15	0	0	0	0	9	15th	4th
2021	Tatuus F3 T-318	(France) Alexandre Bardinon	15	0	0	0	0	0	20th	4th
2021	Tatuus F3 T-318	(Germany) Matthias Lüthen	9	0	0	0	0	0	26th	4th
2022	Tatuus F3 T-318	(Spain) Pepe Martí	15	0	0	2	5	158	2nd	3rd
2022	Tatuus F3 T-318	(Netherlands) Dilano van 't Hoff	12	0	1	0	1	51	13th	3rd
2022	Tatuus F3 T-318	(Philippines) Ayato Iwasaki	15	0	0	0	0	0	27th	3rd
2022	Tatuus F3 T-318	(Turkey) Salih Yoluç	15	0	0	0	0	0	36th	3rd

=== F4 Spanish Championship ===
Year	Car	Drivers	Races	Wins	Poles	F.Laps	Podiums	Points	D.C.	T.C.
2021	Tatuus F4-T014	(Republic of Ireland) Alex Dunne	9	0	1	0	1	30	17th	8th
2022	Tatuus F4-T421	(Mexico) Ricardo Escotto	17	0	0	0	0	4	22nd	9th
2022	Tatuus F4-T421	(India) Anshul Gandhi	12	0	0	0	0	0	28th	9th
2022	Tatuus F4-T421	(Brazil) Nelson Neto	3	0	0	0	0	0	33rd	9th
2022	Tatuus F4-T421	(Australia) Gianmarco Pradel	3	0	0	0	0	0	NC	9th
2022	Tatuus F4-T421	(Argentina) Francisco Soldavini	3	0	0	0	0	0	NC	9th

== Timeline ==
Current series
UAE4 Series	2022–present
Formula Regional Middle East Trophy	2023–present
Formula 4 South East Asia Championship	2023, 2025–present
Formula Trophy UAE	2024–present
Former series
Formula Masters China	2016–2017
Asian Le Mans Series	2016–2017
F4 Chinese Championship	2018
Formula Regional Asian Championship	2018–2022
F4 Spanish Championship	2021–2022
