= Luo Yufeng (racing driver) =

Chinese racing driver

Yufeng Luo
- Nationality: (China) Chinese (United States) American
- Born: 24 June 1998 (age 28) Beijing, China

China Formula 4 Championship career
- Debut season: 2018
- Current team: Champ Motorsport
- Categorisation: FIA Silver
- Car number: 88
- Starts: 21
- Wins: 1
- Podiums: 11
- Poles: 1
- Fastest laps: 1
- Best finish: 2nd in 2018

Previous series
- 2017 2016 2015-16 2015: Pirelli World Challenge; Lamborghini Super Trofeo; U.S. F2000 National Championship; Formula Continental Championship

Championship titles
- 2015: Formula Continental Championship

Luo Yufeng (born June 24, 1998 in Beijing, China) is a Chinese-American former racing driver. He is the 2015 Formula Continental champion and 2018 F4 Chinese Championship vice-champion.

== Career ==
In his debut season, 2014, Luo raced in the Formula Continental and Pacific F2000 series. In the SCCA Majors Tour Western Conference Luo won at Tulsa Raceway Park. The Chinese driver, competing in a Van Diemen DP08, finished third in the series standings. Luo joined the Pacific F2000 series at Buttonwillow Raceway Park and Portland International Raceway finishing all races on the podium. He qualified for the SCCA National Championship Runoffs in the Formula Continental class. Racing with David Freitas Racing, Luo finished the race in fifth place.

For 2015, Luo stepped up to the U.S. F2000 National Championship with Pabst Racing Services. His season started in February with the 2015 U.S. F2000 Winterfest at NOLA Motorsports Park. At the Winterfest, the driver scored two top ten finishes. During the regular season, Luo was a consistent finisher with only one retirement. Luo's best results were three fifth places at St. Petersburg, Indianapolis and Lucas Oil Raceway. The driver finished seventh in the series championship standings, the fourth best rookie. In the SCCA Formula Continental class, Luo entered in four races, winning them all. He therefore qualified for the SCCA National Championship Runoffs. At the Runoffs, Luo lead every practice, qualified on pole, and lead every lap of the race to become the youngest ever Formula Continental champion.

For 2016, Luo remained at Pabst Racing Services in the U.S. F2000 National Championship. The driver scored his best results in the opening weekend at St. Petersburg scoring a second place and a win making him the first Chinese driver to win in the Road to Indy ladder series. Luo again finished seventh in the series standings. He made a one-off appearance in the Lamborghini Super Trofeo series at Virginia International Raceway winning the Pro-Am Category.

Luo competed in five rounds of the Pirelli World Challenge with Bentley Absolute Racing in 2017. His best result came at Canadian Tire Motorsport Park where he placed third.

== Racing record ==
=== Career summary ===
Season	Series	Team	Races	Wins	Poles	F/Laps	Podiums	Points	Position
2015	U.S. F2000 National Championship	Pabst Racing	16	0	0	0	0	193	7th
2015	U.S. F2000 Winterfest	Pabst Racing Services	3	0	0	0	0	32	17th
2016	U.S. F2000 National Championship	Pabst Racing Services	16	1	0	1	2	212	7th
2016	Lamborghini Super Trofeo North America - Pro-Am	US RaceTronics	2	1	0	0	1	15	16th
2017	Pirelli World Challenge - GT	Absolute Racing	8	0	0	0	0	45	43rd
2018	F4 Chinese Championship	Karging League	21	0	0	1	12	270	**2nd**

=== SCCA National Championship Runoffs ===
Year	Track	Car	Engine	Class	Finish	Start	Status
2014	Laguna Seca	Van Diemen DP08	Mazda MZR	Formula Continental	5	6	Running
2015	Daytona	Van Diemen DP08	Mazda MZR	Formula Continental	1	1	Running

=== American Open-Wheel racing results ===
(key) (Races in bold indicate pole position, races in italics indicate fastest race lap)

==== USF2000 National Championship results ====
Year	Entrant	1	2	3	4	5	6	7	8	9	10	11	12	13	14	15	16	Pos	Points
2015	Pabst Racing	STP; 5	STP; 14	NOL; 15	NOL; 9	BAR; 8	BAR; 6	IMS; 17	IMS; 5	LOR; 5	TOR; 12	TOR; 7	MOH; 6	MOH; 8	MOH; 12	LAG; 8	LAG; 9	7th	193
2016	Pabst Racing	STP; 2	STP; 1	BAR; 14	BAR; 11	IMS; 5	IMS; 6	LOR; 5	ROA; 24	ROA; 9	TOR; 6	TOR; 7	MOH; 18	MOH; 17	MOH; 9	LAG; 6	LAG; 7	7th	212

=== F4 Chinese Championship results ===
Year	Entrant	1	2	3	4	5	6	7	8	9	10	11	12	13	14	15	16	17	18	19	20	21	Pos	Points
2018	Champ Motorsport	NIC; 3	NIC; 2	NIC; 3	ZIC; 3	ZIC; Ret	ZIC; 9	CGC; 6	CGC; 4	CGC; 2	NIC; 2	NIC; 3	NIC; 4	SIC; 2	SIC; 2	SIC; DSQ	WUH; 1	WUH; 2	WUH; 3	NIC; 6	NIC; 6	NIC; 4	2nd	270
