= 2018 F3 Asian Championship =

Motor racing competition

The 2018 F3 Asian Championship was a multi-event, Formula 3 open-wheel single seater motor racing championship held across Asia. The championship features a mix of professional and amateur drivers, competing in Formula 3 cars that conform to the FIA Formula 3 regulations for the championship. This is the inaugural season of the championship.

The season commenced on 14 July at Sepang International Circuit and concluded on 25 November at the same venue, after fifteen races to be held at five meetings.

== Teams and drivers ==
Team	No.	Drivers	Status	Rounds
(United States) Chase Owen Racing	00	(United Kingdom) Chase Owen (Note: Owen is an American driver who raced under a British racing license.)		1
(United States) Chase Owen Racing	5	(China) James Yu		1
(Japan) Super License	2	(Japan) Takashi Hata	M	All
(Japan) Super License	7	(Japan) Tomoki Takahashi		All
(China) Zen-Motorsport	3	(China) Yin Hai Tao	M	All
(China) Zen-Motorsport	5	(China) James Yu		2–3, 5
(China) Zen-Motorsport	5	(China) Kang Ling		4
(China) Zen-Motorsport	10	(China) Zheng Jianian		1
(Hong Kong) BlackArts Racing Team	4	(Hong Kong) Louis Prette (Note: Prette is a Monégasque-Italian driver who raced under a Hong Kong racing license.)		All
(Hong Kong) BlackArts Racing Team	9	(Hong Kong) Thomas Lüdi	M	3, 5
(Hong Kong) BlackArts Racing Team	32	(Indonesia) Presley Martono		1
(Hong Kong) BlackArts Racing Team	95	(Czech Republic) Tom Beckhäuser		5
(China) Emc2 Racing	6	(China) Ryan Liu	M	2–4
(Austria) SVC Asia	8	(Kenya) Jeremy Wahome		1, 3–5
(Republic of Ireland) Pinnacle Motorsport	10	(New Zealand) Liam Lawson		5
(Republic of Ireland) Pinnacle Motorsport	55	(China) Daniel Cao		1
(United Kingdom) Dragon HitechGP	11	(Macau) Hon Chio Leong		All
(United Kingdom) Dragon HitechGP	27	(United Kingdom) Raoul Hyman (Note: Hyman is a South African driver who raced under a British license.)		All
(United Kingdom) Dragon HitechGP	34	(United Kingdom) Jake Hughes		1, 3–4
(United Kingdom) Dragon HitechGP	34	(United Kingdom) Ben Hingeley		2
(United Kingdom) Dragon HitechGP	34	(United Kingdom) Harrison Scott		5
(China) Absolute Racing	16	(France) Yifei Ye (Note: Ye is a Chinese driver who raced under a French racing license.)		5
(China) Absolute Racing	29	(Malaysia) Akash Nandy		All
(China) Absolute Racing	80	(United States) Jaden Conwright		All
(Japan) B-Max Racing Team	28	(Japan) Tairoku Yamaguchi	M	5
(Japan) B-Max Racing Team	30	(Japan) Ryuji Kumita	M	1, 3, 5
(India) MSport Asia	33	(India) Akash Gowda		All

Icon	Status
M	Master

== Race calendar ==
The calendar was announced on 26 January 2018.

Round		Circuit	Date	Pole position	Fastest lap	Winning driver	Winning team	Supporting
1	R1	(Malaysia) Sepang International Circuit	14 July	(United Kingdom) Jake Hughes	(United Kingdom) Jake Hughes	(United Kingdom) Jake Hughes	(United Kingdom) Dragon HitechGP	Malaysia Championship Series; Formula 4 South East Asia Championship
1	R2	(Malaysia) Sepang International Circuit	14 July		(United Kingdom) Jake Hughes	(United Kingdom) Jake Hughes	(United Kingdom) Dragon HitechGP	Malaysia Championship Series; Formula 4 South East Asia Championship
1	R3	(Malaysia) Sepang International Circuit	15 July	(United Kingdom) Jake Hughes	(Japan) Tomoki Takahashi	(United Kingdom) Jake Hughes	(United Kingdom) Dragon HitechGP	Malaysia Championship Series; Formula 4 South East Asia Championship
2	R1	(China) Ningbo International Circuit	1 September	(United States) Jaden Conwright	(United States) Jaden Conwright	(United Kingdom) Ben Hingeley	(United Kingdom) Dragon HitechGP	Audi R8 LMS Cup; China Formula 4 Championship; China Formula Grand Prix; TCR China Touring Car Championship
2	R2	(China) Ningbo International Circuit	1 September		(United Kingdom) Raoul Hyman	(United Kingdom) Raoul Hyman	(United Kingdom) Dragon HitechGP	Audi R8 LMS Cup; China Formula 4 Championship; China Formula Grand Prix; TCR China Touring Car Championship
2	R3	(China) Ningbo International Circuit	2 September	(United States) Jaden Conwright	(United Kingdom) Raoul Hyman	(United States) Jaden Conwright	(China) Absolute Racing	Audi R8 LMS Cup; China Formula 4 Championship; China Formula Grand Prix; TCR China Touring Car Championship
3	R1	(China) Shanghai International Circuit	22 September	(United Kingdom) Jake Hughes	(United Kingdom) Jake Hughes	(United Kingdom) Jake Hughes	(United Kingdom) Dragon HitechGP	Blancpain GT Series Asia; China Formula 4 Championship; China Formula Grand Prix
3	R2	(China) Shanghai International Circuit	23 September		(United Kingdom) Jake Hughes	(United Kingdom) Jake Hughes	(United Kingdom) Dragon HitechGP	Blancpain GT Series Asia; China Formula 4 Championship; China Formula Grand Prix
3	R3	(China) Shanghai International Circuit	23 September	(United Kingdom) Jake Hughes	(United Kingdom) Jake Hughes	(United Kingdom) Jake Hughes	(United Kingdom) Dragon HitechGP	Blancpain GT Series Asia; China Formula 4 Championship; China Formula Grand Prix
4	R1	(China) Ningbo International Circuit	13 October	(United Kingdom) Jake Hughes	(United Kingdom) Jake Hughes	(United Kingdom) Jake Hughes	(United Kingdom) Dragon HitechGP	Blancpain GT Series Asia; China Formula 4 Championship; China Formula Grand Prix
4	R2	(China) Ningbo International Circuit	14 October		(United Kingdom) Jake Hughes	(United Kingdom) Jake Hughes	(United Kingdom) Dragon HitechGP	Blancpain GT Series Asia; China Formula 4 Championship; China Formula Grand Prix
4	R3	(China) Ningbo International Circuit	14 October	(United Kingdom) Jake Hughes	(United Kingdom) Jake Hughes	(United Kingdom) Jake Hughes	(United Kingdom) Dragon HitechGP	Blancpain GT Series Asia; China Formula 4 Championship; China Formula Grand Prix
5	R1	(Malaysia) Sepang International Circuit	23 November	(New Zealand) Liam Lawson	(New Zealand) Liam Lawson	(New Zealand) Liam Lawson	(Republic of Ireland) Pinnacle Motorsport	Sepang 1000 km Audi R8 LMS Cup; Formula 4 South East Asia Championship
5	R2	(Malaysia) Sepang International Circuit	24 November		(New Zealand) Liam Lawson	(New Zealand) Liam Lawson	(Republic of Ireland) Pinnacle Motorsport	Sepang 1000 km Audi R8 LMS Cup; Formula 4 South East Asia Championship
5	R3	(Malaysia) Sepang International Circuit	25 November	(New Zealand) Liam Lawson	(New Zealand) Liam Lawson	(New Zealand) Liam Lawson	(Republic of Ireland) Pinnacle Motorsport	Sepang 1000 km Audi R8 LMS Cup; Formula 4 South East Asia Championship

== Championship standings ==
=== Scoring system ===
Points are awarded to the top ten drivers.

Position	**1st**	**2nd**	**3rd**	**4th**	**5th**	**6th**	**7th**	**8th**	**9th**	**10th**
Points	25	18	15	12	10	8	6	4	2	1

=== Drivers' Championship ===
Pos	Driver	SEP1 (Malaysia)			NIS1 (China)			SIC (China)			NIS2 (China)			SEP2 (Malaysia)			Pts
Pos	Driver	R1	R2	R3	R1	R2	R3	R1	R2	R3	R1	R2	R3	R1	R2	R3	Pts
1	(United Kingdom) Raoul Hyman	3	2	3	5	1	3	2	8	2	2	2	2	5	3	5	227
2	(United Kingdom) Jake Hughes	**1**	1	**1**				**1**	1	**1**	**1**	1	**1**				225
3	(United States) Jaden Conwright	4	4	15	**2**	2	**1**	6	5	3	6	4	4	6	14	3	173
4	(Macau) Hon Chio Leong	2	3	12	6	5	6	4	3	4	3	3	3	13	15†	9	145
5	(Japan) Tomoki Takahashi	6	NC	4	3	Ret	5	3	2	6	5	5	12	2	Ret	2	142
6	(Malaysia) Akash Nandy	16†	5	2	4	3	4	7	4	7	4	6	6	9	8	Ret	125
7	(China) James Yu	13	12	5	7	4	7	5	6	Ret				4	4	6	84
8	(New Zealand) Liam Lawson													**1**	1	**1**	75
9	(Hong Kong) Louis Prette	7	9	7	12	7	8	Ret	7	5	Ret	8	5	11	5	7	70
10	(United Kingdom) Ben Hingeley				1	Ret	2										43
11	(France) Yifei Ye													3	2	8	37
12	(Kenya) Jeremy Wahome	8	6	9				8	Ret	11	7	10	10	8	9	Ret	32
13	(India) Akash Gowda	11	11	11	8	6	9	DNS	11	8	Ret	11	9	10	7	10	28
14	(United Kingdom) Harrison Scott													7	6	4	26
15	(United Kingdom) Chase Owen	5	7	6													24
16	(China) Yin Hai Tao	14	14	16	9	9	10	10	10	Ret	9	9	8	12	Ret	11	15
17	(China) Ryan Liu				10	8	11	9	9	10	8	12	11				14
18	(China) Kang Ling										10†	7	7				12
19	(China) Daniel Cao	9	8	10													7
20	(Indonesia) Presley Martono	10	10	8													6
21	(Japan) Takashi Hata	12	13	13	11	Ret	12	Ret	12	9	Ret	Ret	DNS	16	13	13	2
22	(Czech Republic) Tom Beckhäuser													15	10	14	1
23	(Japan) "Dragon"	15	16	Ret				11	13	12				17	Ret	15	0
24	(Japan) Tairoku Yamaguchi													14	11	12	0
25	(Hong Kong) Thomas Lüdi							12	14	13				18	12	Ret	0
26	(China) Zheng Jianian	Ret	15	14													0
Pos	Driver	R1	R2	R3	R1	R2	R3	R1	R2	R3	R1	R2	R3	R1	R2	R3	Pts
Pos	Driver	SEP1 (Malaysia)			NIS1 (China)			SIC (China)			NIS2 (China)			SEP2 (Malaysia)			Pts

Colour	Result
Gold	Winner
Silver	Second place
Bronze	Third place
Green	Points classification
Blue	Non-points classification
Blue	Non-classified finish (NC)
Purple	Retired, not classified (Ret)
Red	Did not qualify (DNQ)
Red	Did not pre-qualify (DNPQ)
Black	Disqualified (DSQ)
White	Did not start (DNS)
White	Withdrew (WD)
White	Race cancelled (C)
Blank	Did not practice (DNP)
Blank	Did not arrive (DNA)
Blank	Excluded (EX)

**Bold** – Pole
Italics – Fastest Lap

Notes:

- † — Drivers did not finish the race, but were classified as they completed over 75% of the race distance.

=== Masters Cup ===
Pos	Driver	SEP1 (Malaysia)			NIS1 (China)			SIC (China)			NIS2 (China)			SEP2 (Malaysia)			Pts
Pos	Driver	R1	R2	R3	R1	R2	R3	R1	R2	R3	R1	R2	R3	R1	R2	R3	Pts
1	(China) Yin Hai Tao	14	14	16	9	9	10	10	10	Ret	9	9	8	12	Ret	11	276
2	(Japan) Takashi Hata	12	13	13	11	Ret	12	Ret	12	9	Ret	Ret	DNS	16	13	13	193
3	(China) Ryan Liu				10	8	11	9	9	10	8	12	11				192
4	(Japan) "Dragon"	15	16	Ret				11	13	12				17	Ret	15	96
5	(Hong Kong) Thomas Lüdi							12	14	13				18	12	Ret	62
6	(Japan) Tairoku Yamaguchi													14	11	12	61
Pos	Driver	R1	R2	R3	R1	R2	R3	R1	R2	R3	R1	R2	R3	R1	R2	R3	Pts
Pos	Driver	SEP1 (Malaysia)			NIS1 (China)			SIC (China)			NIS2 (China)			SEP2 (Malaysia)			Pts

=== Teams' championship ===
Pos.	Team	Points
1	(United Kingdom) Dragon HitechGP	545
2	(China) Absolute Racing	333
3	(Japan) Super License	144
4	(China) Zen-Motorsport	101
5	(Republic of Ireland) Pinnacle Motorsport	82
6	(Hong Kong) BlackArts Racing Team	77
7	(United States) Chase Owen Racing	34
8	(Austria) SVC Asia	32
9	(India) MSport Asia	28
10	(China) Emc2 Racing	14
11	(Japan) B-Max Racing Team	0
