= 2017 Pirelli World Challenge =

The 2017 Pirelli World Challenge was the 28th running of the Pirelli World Challenge. Álvaro Parente was the defending champion in the highest class, the GT class. It was the first season sanctioned by the United States Auto Club, after being under Sports Car Club of America sanctioning for the previous 27 seasons.

== Schedule ==
The calendar was revealed on 13 October 2016. The season comprised eleven rounds, with several rounds in support of the IndyCar Series. All tracks from the previous season returned on the schedule except for Barber Motorsports Park, which was replaced by Virginia International Raceway.

Round	Date	Event	Circuit	Location	Classes	Supporting
1	March 9–12	Grand Prix of St. Petersburg presented by Case-it	Streets of St. Petersburg	St. Petersburg, Florida	GT/GTA/GT Cup (x2); GTS/GTSA (x2)	IndyCar Series
2	April 7–9	Grand Prix of Long Beach presented by Optima Batteries	Streets of Long Beach	Long Beach, California	GT/GTA	IndyCar Series; WeatherTech SportsCar Championship
3	April 28–30	Nissan Grand Prix of VIR	Virginia International Raceway	Alton, Virginia	SprintX (x2); GTS/GTSA (x2); TC/TCA/TCB (x2)	Headline
4	May 19–21	Pirelli World Challenge at CTMP	Canadian Tire Motorsport Park	Bowmanville, Ontario	SprintX (Note: Race 2 cancelled due to a heavy rain shower. The race was replaced by a third race at Circuit of the Americas.); GTS/GTSA (x2); TC/TCA/TCB (x2)	Co-Headliner with Can-Am 200
5	May 26–27	Grand Prix of Lime Rock Park	Lime Rock Park	Lakeville, Connecticut	SprintX (x2); GTS/GTSA (x2); TC (x2); TCA/TCB (x2)	Headline
6	June 23–25	Grand Prix of Road America presented by VP Racing Fuels	Road America	Elkhart Lake, Wisconsin	GT/GTA/GT Cup (x2); GTS/GTSA/TC (Note: The TC class joined the GTS(A) classes, but were not able to score championship points.) (x2)	IndyCar Series
7	July 28–30	Grand Prix of Mid-Ohio presented by Honda Racing	Mid-Ohio Sports Car Course	Lexington, Ohio	GT/GTA/GT Cup (x2); GTS/GTSA (x2)	IndyCar Series
8	August 11–13	Grand Prix of Utah presented by Security National Mortgage	Utah Motorsports Campus	Tooele, Utah	SprintX (x2); GTS/GTSA (x2); TC/TCA/TCB (x2)	Headline
9	September 1–3	Grand Prix of Texas	Circuit of the Americas	Austin, Texas	SprintX (x3); GTS/GTSA (x2); TC/TCA/TCB (x2)	Headline
10	September 15–17	Grand Prix of Sonoma	Sonoma Raceway	Sonoma, California	GT/GTA/GT Cup (x2); GTS/GTSA (x2)	IndyCar Series
11	October 13–15	Grand Prix of Monterey	Mazda Raceway Laguna Seca	Monterey, California	TC (x2); TCA/TCB (x2)	Intercontinental GT Challenge

== Entry list ==
=== GT/GTA/GT Cup ===
Team	Car	No.	Drivers	Rounds
(United States) TRG	Aston Martin V12 Vantage GT3	007	(Australia) J. D. Davison	1
(Mexico) De La Torre Racing	Aston Martin V12 Vantage GT3	04	(Mexico) Jorge De La Torre	1–2, 6–7
(Canada) R. Ferri Motorsport	Ferrari 458 Italia GT3	013	(Canada) Marc Muzzo	6
(Canada) R. Ferri Motorsport	Ferrari 488 GT3	61	(Spain) Alex Riberas	1–2
(Canada) R. Ferri Motorsport	Ferrari 488 GT3	61	(Canada) Kyle Marcelli	7
(United States) CRP Racing	Mercedes-AMG GT3	2	(United Kingdom) Ryan Dalziel	All
(United States) Cadillac Racing	Cadillac ATS-V.R	3	(United States) Johnny O'Connell	All
(United States) Cadillac Racing	Cadillac ATS-V.R	8	(United States) Michael Cooper	All
(United States) Magnus Racing	Audi R8 LMS	4	(Germany) Pierre Kaffer	1–2, 6, 10
(United States) Magnus Racing	Audi R8 LMS	4	(United States) Spencer Pumpelly	7
(United States) Magnus Racing	Audi R8 LMS	44	(United States) John Potter	All
(United States) K-PAX Racing	McLaren 650S GT3	6	(United States) Bryan Sellers	All
(United States) K-PAX Racing	McLaren 650S GT3	9	(Portugal) Álvaro Parente	All
(United States) K-PAX Racing	McLaren 650S GT3	98	(United States) Mike Hedlund	1–2, 6
(United States) Precision Driving	Ferrari 458 Challenge Evo	11	(Serbia) Marko Radisic	1, 6–7
(United States) GMG Racing	Porsche 911 GT3 R	14	(United States) James Sofronas	All
(United States) GMG Racing	Porsche 911 GT3 R	17	(United States) Alec Udell	1
(United States) GMG Racing	Porsche 911 GT3 R	17	(United States) Alec Udell	2, 6–7, 10
(United States) Wright Motorsports	Porsche 911 GT3 R	16	(United States) Michael Schein	All
(United States) Wright Motorsports	Porsche 911 GT3 R	58	(United States) Patrick Long	All
(United States) DIME Racing	Lamborghini Huracán LP 620-2 Super Trofeo	25	(United States) Ricco Shlaimoun	6
(United States) DIME Racing	Lamborghini Huracán GT3	111	(United States) Jonathan Summerton	2
(United States) Dream Racing Motorsport	Lamborghini Huracán LP 620-2 Super Trofeo	55	(Japan) Yuki Harata	6–7, 10
(United States) TR3 Racing	Ferrari 488 GT3	31	(Italy) Daniel Mancinelli	All
(United States) RealTime Racing	Acura NSX GT3	43	(United States) Ryan Eversley	All
(United States) RealTime Racing	Acura NSX GT3	93	(Netherlands) Peter Kox	All
(United States) Black Swan Racing	Mercedes-AMG GT3	54	(United States) Tim Pappas	All
(United States) Champ1	Mercedes-AMG GT3	69	(Argentina) Pablo Pérez Companc	1–2, 7, 10
(United States) Calvert Dynamics	Porsche 911 GT3 Cup	77	(United States) Preston Calvert	1
(United States) Calvert Dynamics	Porsche 911 GT3 R	77	(United States) Preston Calvert	6–7, 10
(Hong Kong) Absolute Racing	Bentley Continental GT3	78	(China) Luo Yufeng	1–2
(Hong Kong) Absolute Racing	Bentley Continental GT3	88	(Hong Kong) Adderly Fong	1–2, 6
(United States) McCann Racing	Audi R8 LMS	82	(United States) Michael McCann	6–7
(United States) MCC Motorsports	Mercedes-AMG GT3	92	(Brazil) Alexandre Negrão	6
(United States) GAINSCO/Bob Stallings Racing	Porsche 911 GT3 R	99	(United States) Jon Fogarty	All
(United States) TKO Motorsports	Porsche 911 GT3 R	101	(United States) Memo Gidley	10

Colour	Class
	GT
	GTA
	GT Cup

=== GTS/GTSA ===
Team	Car	No.	Drivers	Rounds
(United States) / TRG-AMR (Note: Cars No. 007 and 09 entered as TRG-AMR and car No. 03 entered as TRG.); (United States) / TRG	Aston Martin Vantage GT4	007	(United States) Derek DeBoer	10
(United States) / TRG-AMR; (United States) / TRG	Porsche Cayman GT4 Clubsport MR	03	(United States) Craig Lyons	4
(United States) / TRG-AMR; (United States) / TRG	Aston Martin Vantage GT4	09	(United States) Jason Alexandridis	8
(United States) VOLT Racing	McLaren 570S GT4	02	(United States) Alan Brynjolfsson	4–5
(United States) VOLT Racing	Ford Mustang GT4 (Note: The Ford Mustang GT4 was listed as 'Ford Mustang' until the car was formally homolgated on July 31.)	077	(United States) Chris Hall	5
(United States) GMG Racing	McLaren 570S GT4	04	(United States) George Kurtz	All
(United States) GMG Racing	Porsche Cayman GT4 Clubsport MR	7	(United States) Carter Yeung	8–10
(United States) GMG Racing	Porsche Cayman GT4 Clubsport MR	64	(United States) Brett Meredith	9 (Note: Brett Meredith and Jon Miller entered in the same car at Round 9. Meredith participated in Race 1, while Miller participated in Race 2.)
(United States) GMG Racing	Porsche Cayman GT4 Clubsport MR	64	(United States) Jon Miller	9
(United States) Case-it Racing	Porsche Cayman GT4 Clubsport MR	017	(United States) Adam Merzon	1, 3–9
(United States) Case-it Racing	Porsche Cayman GT4 Clubsport MR	018	(Canada) Cameron Cassels	1, 3–6
(United States) Stephen Cameron Racing	Aston Martin Vantage GT4	019	(United States) Ari Balogh	3
(United States) Stephen Cameron Racing	BMW M3 E92	019	(United States) Ari Balogh	4–5
(United States) Racers Edge Motorsports	SIN R1 GT4	2	(United States) Jason Bell	1, 3–9
(United States) Racers Edge Motorsports	SIN R1 GT4	45	(United States) Jade Buford	1, 4
(United States) Racers Edge Motorsports	SIN R1 GT4	45	(United States) Chris Beaufait	3, 6, 8
(United States) Racers Edge Motorsports	SIN R1 GT4	45	(United States) Bob Michaelian	7, 9–10
(United States) Flying Lizard Motorsports	Porsche Cayman GT4 Clubsport MR	3	(Brazil) Rodrigo Baptista	All
(United States) Flying Lizard Motorsports	Porsche Cayman GT4 Clubsport MR	14	(United States) Nate Stacy	All
(Canada) Mantella Autosport	KTM X-Bow GT4	8	(Canada) Anthony Mantella	1, 3–5
(Canada) Mantella Autosport	KTM X-Bow GT4	80	(Canada) Martin Barkey	1
(Canada) Mantella Autosport	KTM X-Bow GT4	80	(Canada) Martin Barkey	3–10
(United States) KRÜGSPEED	Porsche Cayman GT4 Clubsport MR	7	(United States) Cameron Maugeri	1
(United States) ANSA Motorsports	KTM X-Bow GT4	9	(United States) Bill Ziegler	1, 4–7, 9
(United States) ANSA Motorsports	KTM X-Bow GT4	13	(United States) Frankie Montecalvo	1
(United States) ANSA Motorsports	KTM X-Bow GT4	13	(France) Nico Jamin	3
(United States) ANSA Motorsports	KTM X-Bow GT4	13	(United States) Austin Versteeg	6
(United States) ANSA Motorsports	KTM X-Bow GT4	25	(United States) Ricco Shlaimoun	3
(United States) ANSA Motorsports	KTM X-Bow GT4	25	(Canada) Roman De Angelis	4
(United States) ANSA Motorsports	KTM X-Bow GT4	25	(United States) Dakota Dickerson	9
(United States) Blackdog Speed Shop	Chevrolet Camaro GT4.R	10	(United States) Lawson Aschenbach	All
(United States) Blackdog Speed Shop	Chevrolet Camaro GT4.R	11	(United States) Tony Gaples	All
(United States) Ian Lacy Racing	Ginetta G55 GT4	12	(United States) Drew Staveley	6
(United States) Ian Lacy Racing	Ginetta G55 GT4	12	(United States) Drew Staveley	8–10
(United States) Ian Lacy Racing	Ginetta G55 GT4	24	(United States) Frank Gannett	6, 8–10
(United States) / Performance Motorsports Group (Note: Car No. 19 entered as Performance Motorsports Group at Rounds 1, 9 and 10, but as PMG Autosport at Rounds 6 and 7. Car No. 69 entered as Performance Motorsports Group.); (United States) / PMG Autosport	Ginetta G55 GT4	19	(United States) Parker Chase	1, 6–7, 9–10
(United States) / Performance Motorsports Group; (United States) / PMG Autosport	Ginetta G55 GT4	69	(United States) Harry Gottsacker	1
(United States) / Performance Motorsports Group; (United States) / PMG Autosport	Ginetta G55 GT4	69	(United States) Harry Gottsacker	6–7, 9
(United States) CRP Racing	Porsche Cayman GTS	22	(United States) Cody Ellsworth	9
(United States) CRP Racing	Porsche Cayman GT4 Clubsport MR	22	(United Kingdom) Alex Lloyd	10
(United States) Phoenix Performance	Ford Mustang Boss 302R	32	(United States) Andrew Aquilante	1
(United States) PF Racing	Ford Mustang GT4	40	(United States) Ernie Francis Jr.	4, 6–7 (Note: Ernie Francis Jr. and James Pesek entered in the same car at Rounds 6 and 7. Francis Jr. participated in Race 2 of both weekends, while Pesek participated in Race 1 of both weekends.)
(United States) PF Racing	Ford Mustang GT4	40	(United States) James Pesek	6–7
(United States) SDR Motorsports	Lotus Evora GT4	46	(United States) Scott Dollahite	9
(United States) NOLAsport	Porsche Cayman GT4 Clubsport MR	47	(United States) Keith Jensen	6, 8–9
(United States) Team Panoz Racing	Panoz Avezzano GT	50	(United Kingdom) Ian James	All
(United States) KPR	McLaren 570S GT4	62	(United States) Mark Klenin	All
(United States) JCR Motorsports	Maserati GranTurismo MC GT4	89	(Canada) Fred Roberts	4, 6–7
(United States) JCR Motorsports	Maserati GranTurismo MC GT4	99	(United States) Jeff Courtney	3–4, 6–9

Colour	Class
	GTS
	GTSA

=== TC/TCA/TCB ===
Team	Car	No.	Drivers	Rounds
(United States) BERG Racing	Audi RS 3 LMS	007	(United States) John Allen	3–5
(United States) BERG Racing	Audi RS 3 LMS	009	(United States) JT Coupal	All
(United States) BERG Racing	Mazda MX-5	5	(United States) John Weisberg	3–5, 9, 11
(United States) Drengler Racing	Honda Fit	01	(United States) Jasper Drengler	All
(United States) Believeland Motorsport	Mazda 2	02	(United States) Ted Sahley	3–5, 9
(United States) Max Fedler Racing	BMW M235iR	05	(United States) Max Fedler	8 *
(United States) Rearden Racing	BMW M235iR	06	(United States) Jeff Kearl	8
(United States) Rearden Racing	BMW M235iR	017	(United States) Greg Warnock	8
(United States) Rearden Racing	BMW M235iR	065	(United States) Daren Jorgensen	8–9, 11
(United States) Rearden Racing	BMW M235iR	13	(United States) Andrew McCubbins	8
(United States) Copeland Motorsports	Mazda MX-5 Cup	07	(United States) Dean Copeland	3–5
(United States) Copeland Motorsports	Mazda MX-5 Cup	97	(United States) Brian Henderson	3, 5
(United States) Black Armor Helmets	Mazda 2	08	(United States) Stephanie Andersen	11
(United States) Black Armor Helmets	Mazda 2	55	(United States) James Wilson	11
(United States) S.A.C. Racing	Mazda MX-5	080	(United States) Richard Astacio	5
(United States) S.A.C. Racing	Mazda MX-5	68	(United States) Daniel Williams	8
(United States) S.A.C. Racing	Audi RS 3 LMS	69	(United States) Anthony Geraci	All
(United States) S.A.C. Racing	Mazda MX-5 Cup	70	(United States) Elivan Goulart	All
(United States) S.A.C. Racing	Mazda MX-5	73	(United States) Daniel Moen	All
(United States) S.A.C. Racing	Mazda MX-5	74	(United States) Matt Fassnacht	3–5, 8–9
(United States) S.A.C. Racing	Mazda MX-5 Cup	74	(United States) Matt Fassnacht	11
(United States) Classic BMW	BMW M235iR	1	(United States) Toby Grahovec	All *
(United States) Classic BMW	BMW M235iR	2	(United States) Gino Carini	3, 9
(United States) Classic BMW	BMW M235iR	2	(Canada) Jayson Clunie	5, 8, 11
(United States) Classic BMW	BMW M235iR	26	(Canada) Jayson Clunie	*
(United States) Classic BMW	BMW M235iR	26	(United States) Matt Travis	9
(United States) Classic BMW	BMW M235iR	26	(Brazil) Pierre Kleinubing	11
(United States) Classic BMW	BMW M235iR	27	(United States) Gino Carini	*
(United States) Classic BMW	BMW M235iR	29	(United States) Justin Raphael	3–5, 8
(United States) Classic BMW	BMW M235iR	92	(United States) Chris Ohmacht	All
(Germany) KRÜGSPEED	Lotus Exige	4	(United States) Dennis Hanratty Jr.	3–5
(Germany) KRÜGSPEED	Lotus Exige	70	(United States) Elivan Goulart	5
(Germany) KRÜGSPEED	Lotus Exige	72	(United States) Cameron Maugeri	3–4
(United States) Jake Pipal Racing	Mini Cooper	6	(United States) Jake Pipal	3
(United States) Jake Pipal Racing	Honda Fit	6	(United States) Jake Pipal	4–5, 8–9, 11
(United States) Shea Racing	Honda Accord V6 Coupe	7	(United States) Jason Fichter	3
(United States) Shea Racing	Honda Civic Si	65	(United States) Sarah Montgomery	3–4
(United States) Shea Racing	Honda Accord V6 Coupe	67	(United States) Shea Holbrook	3–5
(United States) Shea Racing	Honda Civic Si (2017)	67	(United States) Shea Holbrook	8–9, 11
(United States) Shea Racing	Honda Civic Si	94	(United States) Tom O'Gorman	3–5
(United States) Shea Racing	Honda Civic Si (2017)	94	(United States) Tom O'Gorman	8–9, 11
(United States) Stephen Cameron Racing	BMW M235iR	8	(United States) Rodrigo Sales	All
(United States) Stephen Cameron Racing	BMW M235iR	19	(United States) Ari Balogh	All
(United States) Stephen Cameron Racing	BMW M235iR	20	(United States) Greg Liefooghe	All
(United States) Stephen Cameron Racing	BMW M235iR	87	(United States) Henry Schmitt	All
(United States) Muellerized	Lotus Exige (2016)	9	(United States) Nicolai Elghanayan	11
(United States) RacerInk Motorsports	Porsche Cayman	11	(United States) Cody Ellsworth	3–5
(United States) RacerInk Motorsports	Porsche Cayman	111	(United States) Cody Ellsworth	*
(United States) Winding Road Team TFB	BMW M235iR	12	(United States) Mason Filippi	All
(United States) Winding Road Team TFB	BMW M235iR	81	(United States) Jacob Ruud	5, 8–9
(United States) Winding Road Team TFB	Mazda MX-5 Cup	89	(United States) Jeff Sexton	3–4, 8–9, 11
(United States) Hale Motorsports	Mazda 2	16	(Canada) Damon Surzyshyn	11
(United States) Hale Motorsports	Mazda MX-5	17	(United States) Randy Hale	3, 5, 9, 11
(United States) Zorro Racing	Nissan 370Z	16	(United States) Derek Kulach	9
(United States) ZIMA Motorsports	BMW M235iR	18	(Serbia) Stefan Sajic	3–5, 8–9 *
(United States) ZIMA Motorsports	BMW M235iR	36	(India) Chetan Puranik	3–4, 8–9
(United States) ZIMA Motorsports	BMW M235iR	36	(United States) Randy Pobst	5
(United States) ZIMA Motorsports	BMW M235iR	36	(Serbia) Marko Radisic	*
(United States) Tech Sport Racing	Mazda MX-5	21	(United States) Michael Johnson	3
(United States) Tech Sport Racing	Mazda MX-5	21	(United States) Steve Streimer	5
(United States) Tech Sport Racing	Scion FR-S	22	(United States) Kevin Anderson	3–5, 11
(United States) Tech Sport Racing	Scion FR-S	22	(United States) Breton Williams	8
(United States) Tech Sport Racing	Scion FR-S	22	(United States) Daniel Williams	9
(United States) Tech Sport Racing	Mazda MX-5	23	(United States) Eric Powell	3–5
(United States) Tech Sport Racing	Scion FR-S	23	(United States) Eric Powell	8–9, 11
(United States) Tech Sport Racing	Chevrolet Sonic	24	(United States) Canaan O'Connell	All
(United States) Tech Sport Racing	Chevrolet Sonic	25	(Canada) P. J. Groenke	All
(United States) AutoTechnic Racing	BMW M235iR	28	(United States) Robert Nimkoff	3–5, 8–9
(United States) AutoTechnic Racing	BMW M235iR	28	(United States) Johan Schwartz	11
(United States) AutoTechnic Racing	BMW M235iR	82	(United States) Scott Thomas	11
(United States) Indian Summer Racing	Mini Cooper	30	(United States) Travis Washay	3–5
(United States) Indian Summer Racing	Audi RS 3 LMS	30	(United States) Travis Washay	8–9, 11
(United States) Indian Summer Racing	Mini Cooper	77	(United States) Taylor Handwerk	3–5
(United States) Murillo Racing	Mazda MX-5 Cup	33	(United States) Kenny Murillo	8–9, 11
(United States) Brass Monkey Racing	Nissan 370Z	34	(United States) Tony Rivera	All
(United States) ISellMiataParts	Mazda 2	37	(United States) Blake Thompson	3–5, 9
(Canada) ST Racing	BMW M235iR	38	(Canada) Samantha Tan	All *
(Canada) ST Racing	BMW M235iR	91	(Canada) Nick Wittmer	All *
(United States) Parallax Racing	Honda Accord V6 Coupe	40	(United States) Steve Kohli	3
(United States) Ian Lacy Racing	Ford Mustang	43	(United States) Steve Burns	8
(United States) Rains Racing	Honda Accord V6 Coupe	44	(United States) Andrew Rains	3
(Canada) Lapse Motorsport	Honda Civic Si	50	(Canada) Éric Laporte	4–5
(United States) PWR	Honda Civic Si	51	(United States) Paul Whiting	3, 5
(Puerto Rico) Glory Racing	Honda Civic Si	52	(Puerto Rico) Glory Fernandez (Note: Glory Fernandez and Paul Whiting entered in the same car at Round 8. Fernandez participated in Race 2, while Whiting participated in Race 1.)	3, 8
(Puerto Rico) Glory Racing	Honda Civic Si	52	(United States) Paul Whiting	8
(United States) NOLAsport	Mazda MX-5 Cup	53	(United States) Keith Jensen	9
(United States) Hooverspeed	Mazda MX-5	54	(United States) Mark Drennan	11
(Canada) M&S Racing	Honda Civic Si	66	(Canada) Gary Kwok	4
(Canada) C360R	Audi RS 3 LMS	71	(United States) Paul Holton	All
(United States) GenRacer	Hyundai Genesis Coupe	75	(United States) Nick Barbato	*
(United States) GenRacer	Hyundai Genesis Coupe	75	(United States) Dan Honovich	9
(United States) GenRacer	Hyundai Genesis Coupe	78	(United States) Jeff Ricca	3–5, 9 *
(United States) Patterson Racing	Mazda MX-5	79	(United States) Spencer Patterson	3–4
(United States) Rooster Hall Racing	BMW M235iR	80	(United States) Anthony Magagnoli	All
(United States) DG-Spec Racing	Toyota TMG 86 Cup Car	86	(United States) Craig Stanton	8
(United States) DSPORT Magazine	Mazda MX-5 Cup	88	(United States) Cameron Parsons	11
(United States) Team HMA	Honda Accord V6 Coupe	93	(United States) Joshua Foran	3, 5, 9, 11
(United States) Turner Motorsport	BMW M235iR	95	(United States) Will Turner	5
(United States) Turner Motorsport	BMW M235iR	96	(United States) Dane Cameron	5
(Canada) Honda Ste-Rose Racing	Honda Accord V6 Coupe	99	(Canada) Karl Wittmer	All
(United States) Rossini Racing Products	Mazda MX-5	155	(United States) Jason Connole	3

Colour	Class
	TC
	TCA
	TCB

Notes

- – Drivers with an asterisk in the "Rounds" column took part in the non-championship round at Road America.

== Race results ==
Round		Circuit	GT Winning Car	GTA Winning Car	GT Cup Winning Car	GTS Winning Car	GTSA Winning Car	TC Winning Car	TCA Winning Car	TCB Winning Car
Round		Circuit	GT Winning Driver	GTA Winning Driver	GT Cup Winning Driver	GTS Winning Driver	GTSA Winning Driver	TC Winning Driver	TCA Winning Driver	TCB Winning Driver
1	R1	St. Petersburg	#9 McLaren 650S GT3	#17 Porsche 911 GT3 R	#77 Porsche 911 GT3 Cup	#32 Ford Mustang Boss 302R	#80 KTM X-Bow GT4	Did not participate		
1	R1	St. Petersburg	(Portugal) Álvaro Parente	(United States) Alec Udell	(United States) Preston Calvert	(United States) Andrew Aquilante	(Canada) Martin Barkey	Did not participate		
1	R2	St. Petersburg	#58 Porsche 911 GT3 R	#17 Porsche 911 GT3 R	#77 Porsche 911 GT3 Cup	#32 Ford Mustang Boss 302R	#69 Ginetta G55 GT4	Did not participate		
1	R2	St. Petersburg	(United States) Patrick Long	(United States) Alec Udell	(United States) Preston Calvert	(United States) Andrew Aquilante	(United States) Harry Gottsacker	Did not participate		
2		Long Beach	#9 McLaren 650S GT3	#14 Porsche 911 GT3 R	Did not participate					
2		Long Beach	(Portugal) Alvaro Parente	(United States) James Sofronas	Did not participate					
3	R1	Virginia	Did not participate			#13 KTM X-Bow GT4	#019 Aston Martin Vantage GT4	#71 Audi RS 3 LMS	#74 Mazda MX-5	#24 Chevrolet Sonic
3	R1	Virginia	Did not participate			(France) Nico Jamin	(United States) Ari Balogh	(United States) Paul Holton	(United States) Matt Fassnacht	(United States) Canaan O'Connell
3	R2	Virginia	Did not participate			#13 KTM X-Bow GT4	#2 SIN R1 GT4	#20 BMW M235iR	#74 Mazda MX-5	#30 Mini Cooper
3	R2	Virginia	Did not participate			(France) Nico Jamin	(United States) Jason Bell	(United States) Greg Liefooghe	(United States) Matt Fassnacht	(United States) Travis Washay
4	R1	Mosport	Did not participate			#45 SIN R1 GT4	#019 BMW M3 E92	#71 Audi RS 3 LMS	#07 Mazda MX-5 Cup	#6 Honda Fit
4	R1	Mosport	Did not participate			(United States) Jade Buford	(United States) Ari Balogh	(United States) Paul Holton	(United States) Dean Copeland	(United States) Jake Pipal
4	R2	Mosport	Did not participate			#45 SIN R1 GT4	#04 McLaren 570S GT4	#12 BMW M235iR	#94 Honda Civic Si	#6 Honda Fit
4	R2	Mosport	Did not participate			(United States) Jade Buford	(United States) George Kurtz	(United States) Mason Filippi	(United States) Tom O'Gorman	(United States) Jake Pipal
5	R1	Lime Rock	Did not participate			#3 Porsche Cayman; GT4 Clubsport MR	#62 McLaren 570S GT4	#70 Lotus Exige	#70 Mazda MX-5 Cup	#24 Chevrolet Sonic
5	R1	Lime Rock	Did not participate			(Brazil) Rodrigo Baptista	(United States) Mark Klenin	(United States) Elivan Goulart	(United States) Elivan Goulart	(United States) Canaan O'Connell
5	R2	Lime Rock	Did not participate			#3 Porsche Cayman; GT4 Clubsport MR	#077 Ford Mustang	#96 BMW M235iR	#70 Mazda MX-5 Cup	#24 Chevrolet Sonic
5	R2	Lime Rock	Did not participate			(Brazil) Rodrigo Baptista	(United States) Chris Hall	(United States) Dane Cameron	(United States) Elivan Goulart	(United States) Canaan O'Connell
6	R1	Road America	#88 Bentley Continental GT3	#14 Porsche 911 GT3 R	#55 Lamborghini Huracán; LP 620-2 Super Trofeo	#50 Panoz Avezzano GT	#04 McLaren 570S GT4	#111 Porsche Cayman	Did not participate	
6	R1	Road America	(Hong Kong) Adderly Fong	(United States) James Sofronas	(Japan) Yuki Harata	(United Kingdom) Ian James	(United States) George Kurtz	(United States) Cody Ellsworth	Did not participate	
6	R2	Road America	#58 Porsche 911 GT3 R	#14 Porsche 911 GT3 R	#11 Ferrari 458 Challenge Evo	#50 Panoz Avezzano GT	#04 McLaren 570S GT4	#91 BMW M235iR	Did not participate	
6	R2	Road America	(United States) Patrick Long	(United States) James Sofronas	(Serbia) Marko Radisic	(United Kingdom) Ian James	(United States) George Kurtz	(Canada) Nick Wittmer	Did not participate	
7	R1	Mid-Ohio	#9 McLaren 650S GT3	#14 Porsche 911 GT3 R	#55 Lamborghini Huracán; LP 620-2 Super Trofeo	#10 Chevrolet Camaro GT4.R	#04 McLaren 570S GT4	Did not participate		
7	R1	Mid-Ohio	(Portugal) Álvaro Parente	(United States) James Sofronas	(Japan) Yuki Harata	(United States) Lawson Aschenbach	(United States) George Kurtz	Did not participate		
7	R2	Mid-Ohio	#9 McLaren 650S GT3	#14 Porsche 911 GT3 R	#55 Lamborghini Huracán; LP 620-2 Super Trofeo	#50 Panoz Avezzano GT	#04 McLaren 570S GT4	Did not participate		
7	R2	Mid-Ohio	(Portugal) Álvaro Parente	(United States) James Sofronas	(Japan) Yuki Harata	(United Kingdom) Ian James	(United States) George Kurtz	Did not participate		
8	R1	Utah	Did not participate			#3 Porsche Cayman; GT4 Clubsport MR	#04 McLaren 570S GT4	#20 BMW M235iR	#67 Honda Civic Si (2017)	#25 Chevrolet Sonic
8	R1	Utah	Did not participate			(Brazil) Rodrigo Baptista	(United States) George Kurtz	(United States) Greg Liefooghe	(United States) Shea Holbrook	(Canada) P. J. Groenke
8	R2	Utah	Did not participate			#50 Panoz Avezzano GT	#04 McLaren 570S GT4	#20 BMW M235iR	#23 Scion FR-S	#24 Chevrolet Sonic
8	R2	Utah	Did not participate			(United Kingdom) Ian James	(United States) George Kurtz	(United States) Greg Liefooghe	(United States) Eric Powell	(United States) Canaan O'Connell
9	R1	Austin	Did not participate			#50 Panoz Avezzano GT	#04 McLaren 570S GT4	#20 BMW M235iR	#33 Mazda MX-5 Cup	#24 Chevrolet Sonic
9	R1	Austin	Did not participate			(United Kingdom) Ian James	(United States) George Kurtz	(United States) Greg Liefooghe	(United States) Kenny Murillo	(United States) Canaan O'Connell
9	R2	Austin	Did not participate			#3 Porsche Cayman; GT4 Clubsport MR	#04 McLaren 570S GT4	#91 BMW M235iR	#33 Mazda MX-5 Cup	#6 Honda Fit
9	R2	Austin	Did not participate			(Brazil) Rodrigo Baptista	(United States) George Kurtz	(Canada) Nick Wittmer	(United States) Kenny Murillo	(United States) Jake Pipal
10	R1	Sonoma	#8 Cadillac ATS-V.R	#16 Porsche 911 GT3 R	#55 Lamborghini Huracán; LP 620-2 Super Trofeo	#50 Panoz Avezzano GT	#007 Aston Martin Vantage GT4	Did not participate		
10	R1	Sonoma	(United States) Michael Cooper	(United States) Michael Schein	(Japan) Yuki Harata	(United Kingdom) Ian James	(United States) Derek DeBoer	Did not participate		
10	R2	Sonoma	#8 Cadillac ATS-V.R	#14 Porsche 911 GT3 R	No finishers	#10 Chevrolet Camaro GT4.R	#11 Chevrolet Camaro GT4.R	Did not participate		
10	R2	Sonoma	(United States) Michael Cooper	(United States) James Sofronas	No finishers	(United States) Lawson Aschenbach	(United States) Tony Gaples	Did not participate		
11	R1	Laguna Seca	Did not participate					#71 Audi RS 3 LMS	#23 Scion FR-S	#25 Chevrolet Sonic
11	R1	Laguna Seca	Did not participate					(United States) Paul Holton	(United States) Eric Powell	(Canada) P. J. Groenke
11	R2	Laguna Seca	Did not participate					#71 Audi RS 3 LMS	#23 Scion FR-S	#25 Chevrolet Sonic
11	R2	Laguna Seca	Did not participate					(United States) Paul Holton	(United States) Eric Powell	(Canada) P. J. Groenke

== Championship standings ==
=== Drivers' championships ===
Championship points were awarded for the first twenty positions in each race. The pole-sitter also received one point with the exception of the GTA and GTSA classes. Entries were required to complete 50% of the winning car's race distance in order to be classified and earn points.

Position	**1st**	**2nd**	**3rd**	**4th**	**5th**	**6th**	**7th**	**8th**	**9th**	**10th**	**11th**	**12th**	**13th**	**14th**	**15th**	**16th**	**17th**	**18th**	**19th**	**20th**	**Pole**
Points	25	23	21	19	17	15	14	13	12	11	10	9	8	7	6	5	4	3	2	1	1

==== GT ====
Pos.	Driver	Team	STP		LBH	VIR		MOS	LIM		ELK		MOH		UTA		AUS			SON		Overall	Sprint
1	(United States) Patrick Long	(United States) Wright Motorsports	3	1	2	6	30	**2**	**1**	**Ret**	2	1	5	2	3	6	1	8	2	3	**2**	365	202
2	(United States) Michael Cooper	(United States) Cadillac Racing	7	5	14	4	3	1	4	2	3	5	2	7	8	3	4	6	Ret	1	1	338	163
3	(Portugal) Álvaro Parente	(United States) K-PAX Racing	1	4	**1**	29	2	30	3	3	6	6	**1**	**1**	6	4	21	4	4	2	Ret	315	175
4	(Italy) Daniel Mancinelli	(United States) TR3 Racing	**14**	10	4	1	4	13	25	10	4	4	9	5	2	**1**	2	1	Ret	**5**	15	291	129
5	(United Kingdom) Ryan Dalziel	(United States) CRP Racing	16	7	6	5	1	6	6	9	Ret	9	7	9	9	8	3	5	1	6	5	276	104
6	(United States) Johnny O'Connell	(United States) Cadillac Racing	4	2	20	7	13	3	26	7	8	3	3	11	4	5	5	**2**	7	17	8	275	126
7	(United States) Bryan Sellers	(United States) K-PAX Racing	5	9	3	18	12	7	8	8	9	10	4	10	10	7	8	12	5	15	4	244	128
8	(United States) Ryan Eversley	(United States) RealTime Racing	22	8	11	19	11	11	5	5	10	8	10	8	5	2	9	9	6	Ret	Ret	206	71
9	(Netherlands) Peter Kox	(United States) RealTime Racing	8	Ret	13	Ret	14	9	7	6	5	Ret	18	6	**1**	11	Ret	7	8	9	7	193	82
10	(United States) Jordan Taylor	(United States) Cadillac Racing				4	3	1	4	2					8	3	4	6	Ret			175	–
11	(Germany) Pierre Kaffer	(United States) Magnus Racing	19	15	8	28	5	5			11	11			Ret	9	6	10	3	4	3	174	81
12	(United States) James Sofronas	(United States) GMG Racing	13	14	10	10	15	8	12	19	13	12	13	12	12	12	10	11	**10**	10	10	174	82
13	(Canada) Daniel Morad	(United States) CRP Racing				5	1	6	6	9					9	8	3	5	1			172	–
14	(Hong Kong) Adderly Fong	(Hong Kong) Absolute Racing	11	Ret	WD	11	8	4	9	4	**1**	**2**			7	27	7	15	Ret			167	60
15	(United States) Alec Udell	(United States) GMG Racing	9	6	7						7	7	8	3						Ret	9	153	115
15	(United States) Alec Udell	(United States) Calvert Dynamics				14	Ret	18	17	20					15	16	16	Ret	14			153	115
16	(United States) Spencer Pumpelly	(United States) Magnus Racing				28	5	5	2	1			12	20	Ret	9	6	10	3			151	10
17	(United States) Ricky Taylor	(United States) Cadillac Racing				7	13	3	26	7					4	5	5	**2**	7			149	–
18	(United States) Michael Schein	(United States) Wright Motorsports	12	11	15	3	16	10	10	11	DNS	Ret	14	13	11	17	14	29	12	8	Ret	141	53
19	(United Kingdom) Ben Barnicoat	(United States) K-PAX Racing				29	2	30	3	3					6	4	21	4	4			140	–
20	(Germany) Jörg Bergmeister	(United States) Wright Motorsports				6	30	**2**							3	6	1	8	2			136	–
21	(United States) Tom Dyer	(United States) RealTime Racing				19	11	11	5	5					5	2	9	9	6			135	–
22	(United States) Jon Fogarty	(United States) GAINSCO/Bob Stallings Racing	10	Ret	9						12	Ret	11	15	19	10		3	9	7	6	123	77
23	(Italy) Niccolò Schirò	(United States) TR3 Racing						13	25	10					2	**1**	2	1	Ret			118	–
24	(Canada) Mark Wilkins	(United States) RealTime Racing				Ret	14	9	7	6					**1**	11	Ret	7	8			111	–
25	(United States) Tim Pappas	(United States) Black Swan Racing	17	17	21	22	**10**	20	13	13	16	14	15	17	16	14	**11**	13	11	DSQ	12	110	39
26	(Monaco) Vincent Abril	(Hong Kong) Absolute Racing				11	8	4	9	4					7	27	7	15	Ret			107	–
27	(United States) John Potter	(United States) Magnus Racing	18	18	16	31	25	16	15	14	14	13	16	16	13	15	13	Ret	13	12	14	100	52
28	(Belgium) Jan Heylen	(United States) Wright Motorsports				3	16	10	10	11					11	17	14	29	12			90	–
29	(Spain) Alex Riberas	(Canada) R. Ferri Motorsport	6	**3**	5	9	6	DNS														81	54
30	(United States) Michael Lewis	(United States) K-PAX Racing				16	18	17	28	18					10	7	8	12	5			79	–
31	(Netherlands) Jeroen Bleekemolen	(United States) Black Swan Racing				22	**10**	20	13	13					16	14	**11**	13	11			71	–
32	(Canada) Kyle Marcelli	(Canada) R. Ferri Motorsport				9	6	DNS					6	4								61	34
33	(United States) Preston Calvert	(United States) Calvert Dynamics				14	Ret	18	17	20	17	18	19	22	15	16	16	Ret	14	14	Ret	54	16
34	(United Kingdom) Jonny Kane	(United States) K-PAX Racing				18	12	7	8	8												52	–
35	(United States) Andrew Davis	(United States) McCann Racing				**2**	7															51	–
35	(United States) Andrew Davis	(United States) Magnus Racing							15	14												51	–
36	(France) Mathieu Jaminet	(United States) GMG Racing													12	12	10	11	**10**			51	–
37	(Venezuela) Henrique Cisneros	(United States) MOMO/NGT Motorsports				15	17	15	16	15					18	18	15	16	15			50	–
38	(United States) Mike Skeen	(United States) McCann Racing				**2**	7											14	17			49	–
39	(United States) Dane Cameron	(United States) Magnus Racing							2	1												48	–
40	(United States) Frankie Montecalvo (Mexico) Ricardo Sánchez	(Canada) Always Evolving/AIM Autosport				Ret	20	14	11	12					21	13	12	17	DNS			48	–
42	(Germany) Wolf Henzler	(United States) GAINSCO/Bob Stallings Racing													19	10		3	9			46	–
43	(China) Luo Yufeng	(Hong Kong) Absolute Racing	23	16	17	8	19	12	14	16												45	9
44	(Italy) Andrea Montermini	(United States) TR3 Racing				1	4															44	–
45	(Australia) J. D. Davison	(United States) TRG	2	21																		44	24
45	(Australia) J. D. Davison	(United States) DIME Racing				13	9															44	24
46	(Argentina) Pablo Pérez Companc	(United States) Champ1	Ret	13	18								22	14						11	11	38	38
47	(Germany) Marco Seefried	(United States) Magnus Racing				31	25	16							13	15	13	Ret	13			35	–
48	(Belgium) Laurens Vanthoor	(United States) GMG Racing				10	15	8														30	–
49	(United States) Mike Hedlund	(United States) K-PAX Racing	15	12	22	16	18	17	28	18	WD	WD										30	15
50	(United States) Jonathan Summerton	(United States) DIME Racing			12	13	9															29	9
51	(Germany) Marc Lieb	(United States) Wright Motorsports							**1**	**Ret**												27	–
52	(United States) Tyler McQuarrie	(United States) MOMO/NGT Motorsports				15	17	15	16	15												27	–
53	(Switzerland) Alexandre Imperatori	(Hong Kong) Absolute Racing				8	19	12														24	–
54	(United States) Michael McCann	(United States) McCann Racing									18	17	21	19				14	17			21	10
55	(United States) Drew Regitz (United States) Kris Wilson	(United States) TRG-AMR				12	21	23	18	17												19	–
55	(United States) Drew Regitz (United States) Kris Wilson	(Canada) R. Ferri Motorsport													20	19						19	–
57	(Mexico) Jorge De La Torre	(Mexico) De La Torre Racing	20	19	19						20	19	17	18				23	23			19	15
58	(United States) Peter Ludwig	(United States) MOMO/NGT Motorsports															15	16	15			17	–
59	(United States) Memo Gidley	(United States) TKO Motorsports																		13	13	16	16
60	(Brazil) Alexandre Negrão	(United States) MCC Motorsports				17	31	WD			15	15										16	12
61	(Macau) André Couto	(Hong Kong) Absolute Racing							14	16												12	–
62	(New Zealand) Matthew Halliday	(United States) GMG Racing							12	19												11	–
63	(Canada) James Dayson	(United States) M1GT Racing				27	24	21	WD	WD					23	21	17	20	18			11	–
64	(Canada) Marc Muzzo	(Canada) R. Ferri Motorsport						19			19	16										9	7
65	(South Korea) Andrew Kim (United Kingdom) Will Stevens	(Hong Kong) Absolute Racing													14	31						7	–
67	(United States) Jason Bell	(United States) M1GT Racing													23	21		20	18			7	–
68	(United States) Walt Bowlin (United Kingdom) Lars Viljoen	(United States) M1GT Racing																26	16			6	–
70	(United States) Jonathon Ziegelman	(United States) MOMO/NGT Motorsports													18	18						6	–
71	(Canada) David Ostella	(United States) M1GT Racing						21	WD	WD							17					4	–
72	(United States) David Askew (Canada) Aaron Povoledo	(United States) DXDT Racing													17	28						4	–
74	(Brazil) Alexandre Negrão Sr.	(United States) MCC Motorsports				17	31	WD														4	–
75	(Philippines) Ate de Jong	(Mexico) De La Torre Racing																23	23			4	–
76	(United States) Terry Borcheller	(Canada) R. Ferri Motorsport						19														2	–
77	(United States) Larry Pegram	(United States) M1GT Racing				27	24															0	–
78	(Mexico) Martín Fuentes (Sweden) Stefan Johansson	(United States) Scuderia Corsa				30	27	WD														0	–
Pos.	Driver	Team	STP		LBH	VIR		MOS	LIM		ELK		MOH		UTA		AUS			SON		Overall	Sprint

Key
Colour	Result
Gold	Race winner
Silver	2nd place
Bronze	3rd place
Green	Points finish
Blue	Non-points finish
Blue	Non-classified finish (NC)
Purple	Did not finish (Ret)
Black	Disqualified (DSQ)
Black	Excluded (EX)
White	Did not start (DNS)
White	Race cancelled (C)
White	Withdrew (WD)
Blank	Did not participate

SprintX races

**Bold** – Pole position
Italics – Fastest Lap

==== GTA ====
Pos.	Driver	Team	STP		LBH	ELK		MOH		SON		Points
1	(United States) James Sofronas	(United States) GMG Racing	13	14	**10**	**13**	**12**	13	12	10	10	211
2	(United States) John Potter	(United States) Magnus Racing	18	18	16	14	13	16	16	12	14	171
3	(United States) Tim Pappas	(United States) Black Swan Racing	17	17	21	16	14	15	17	DSQ	12	146
4	(United States) Michael Schein	(United States) Wright Motorsports	12	11	15	DNS	Ret	**14**	**13**	**8**	**Ret**	140
5	(Argentina) Pablo Pérez Companc	(United States) Champ1	Ret	13	18			22	14	11	11	114
6	(Mexico) Jorge De La Torre	(Mexico) De La Torre Racing	20	19	19	20	19	17	18			101
7	(United States) Preston Calvert	(United States) Calvert Dynamics				17	18	19	22	14	Ret	79
8	(United States) Michael McCann	(United States) McCann Racing				18	17	21	19			62
9	(United States) Mike Hedlund	(United States) K-PAX Racing	15	12	22	WD	WD					53
10	(United States) Alec Udell	(United States) GMG Racing	**9**	**6**								50
11	(China) Luo Yufeng	(Hong Kong) Absolute Racing	22	16	17							47
12	(Canada) Marc Muzzo	(Canada) R. Ferri Motorsport				19	16					34
Pos.	Driver	Team	STP		LBH	ELK		MOH		SON		Points

==== GT Cup ====
Pos.	Driver	Team	STP		ELK		MOH		SON		Points
1	(Japan) Yuki Harata	(United States) Dream Racing Motorsport			**21**	**21**	**20**	**21**	**16**	**DNS**	129
2	(United States) Preston Calvert	(United States) Calvert Dynamics	21	**20**							51
3	(Serbia) Marko Radisic	(United States) Precision Driving	**Ret**	DNS	Ret	20	Ret	23			49
	(United States) Ricco Shlaimoun	(United States) DIME Racing			WD	WD					0
Pos.	Driver	Team	STP		ELK		MOH		SON		Points

==== GTS ====
Pos.	Driver	Team	STP		VIR		MOS		LIM		ELK		MOH		UTA		AUS		SON		Points
1	(United States) Lawson Aschenbach	(United States) Blackdog Speed Shop	**2**	2	3	3	3	2	5	2	2	2	1	**2**	9	5	5	9	6	1	366
2	(United Kingdom) Ian James	(United States) Team Panoz Racing	Ret	Ret	6	4	21	4	2	15	**1**	1	2	1	3	1	**1**	Ret	**1**	**2**	303
3	(Canada) Martin Barkey	(Canada) Mantella Autosport	5	11	4	5	**5**	8	**7**	**5**	10	8	7	7	4	11	8	6	2	13	268
4	(Brazil) Rodrigo Baptista	(United States) Flying Lizard Motorsports	4	6	5	Ret	20	6	1	1	5	29	DSQ	16	**1**	14	3	1	5	3	257
5	(United States) Nate Stacy	(United States) Flying Lizard Motorsports	6	9	10	Ret	9	7	3	4	13	4	6	8	7	3	9	8	7	4	252
6	(United States) George Kurtz	(United States) GMG Racing	12	8	DNS	Ret	8	9	9	9	7	3	4	9	6	4	10	10	14	9	212
7	(United States) Jeff Courtney	(United States) JCR Motorsports			**2**	2	6	5			3	30	14	6	2	**12**	6	3			191
8	(United States) Tony Gaples	(United States) Blackdog Speed Shop	7	7	DNS	12	10	10	12	8	11	13	13	10	11	Ret	11	14	11	6	170
9	(United States) Mark Klenin	(United States) KPR	11	Ret	9	10	19	18	4	7	9	6	15	13	10	13	14	13	10	10	168
10	(United States) Parker Chase	(United States) Performance Motorsports Group	17	3													2	2	3	8	148
10	(United States) Parker Chase	(United States) PMG Autosport									31	12	5	5							148
11	(United States) Harry Gottsacker	(United States) Performance Motorsports Group	18	5							6	7	**3**	3			4	**5**			129
12	(United States) Drew Staveley	(United States) Ian Lacy Racing									8	11			5	2	7	4	8	5	126
13	(United States) Adam Merzon	(United States) Case-it Racing	13	12	11	13	14	16	14	13	14	16	11	14	12	7	15	18			123
14	(United States) Jason Bell	(United States) Racers Edge Motorsports	8	15	12	6	18	13	11	Ret	29	15	8	12	16	Ret	Ret	19			101
15	(Canada) Anthony Mantella	(Canada) Mantella Autosport	10	Ret	8	11	4	3	10	6											100
16	(United States) Jade Buford	(United States) Racers Edge Motorsports	3	DNS			1	**1**													72
17	(Canada) Cameron Cassels	(United States) Case-it Racing	16	10	Ret	7	12	17	13	11	18	Ret									64
18	(United States) Bill Ziegler	(United States) ANSA Motorsports	15	13			15	14	Ret	12	30	17	12	15			16	Ret			61
19	(United States) Ernie Francis Jr.	(United States) PF Racing					2	Ret				5		4							59
20	(United States) Frank Gannett	(United States) Ian Lacy Racing									16	28			8	6	13	15	Ret	14	56
21	(United States) Carter Yeung	(United States) GMG Racing													13	9	12	12	13	12	55
22	(United States) Andrew Aquilante	(United States) Phoenix Performance	1	**1**																	51
23	(France) Nico Jamin	(United States) ANSA Motorsports			1	**1**															51
24	(United States) Chris Beaufait	(United States) Racers Edge Motorsports			13	8					15	18			14	8					50
25	(United States) Ari Balogh	(United States) Stephen Cameron Racing			7	Ret	7	11	DNS	14											45
26	(United States) Bob Michaelian	(United States) Racers Edge Motorsports											9	11			20	11	12	Ret	42
27	(United States) Alan Brynjolfsson	(United States) VOLT Racing					11	DNS	6	10											36
28	(United States) Keith Jensen	(United States) NOLAsport									Ret	10			15	10	19	16			35
29	(United States) Chris Hall	(United States) VOLT Racing							8	3											34
30	(United States) Derek DeBoer	(United States) TRG-AMR																	4	7	33
31	(Canada) Fred Roberts	(United States) JCR Motorsports					13	12			12	14	Ret	DNS							33
32	(United States) Austin Versteeg	(United States) ANSA Motorsports									4	**9**									32
33	(United States) Frankie Montecalvo	(United States) ANSA Motorsports	9	4																	31
34	(United Kingdom) Alex Lloyd	(United States) CRP Racing																	9	11	22
35	(United States) Ricco Shlaimoun	(United States) ANSA Motorsports			14	9															19
36	(United States) James Pesek	(United States) PF Racing									17		10								15
37	(United States) Scott Dollahite	(United States) SDR Motorsports															DSQ	7			14
38	(United States) Cameron Maugeri	(United States) KRÜGSPEED	14	14																	14
39	(United States) Craig Lyons	(United States) TRG					17	15													10
40	(Canada) Roman De Angelis	(United States) ANSA Motorsports					16	DNS													5
41	(United States) Dakota Dickerson	(United States) ANSA Motorsports															17	Ret			4
42	(United States) Cody Ellsworth	(United States) CRP Racing															Ret	17			4
43	(United States) Jason Alexandridis	(United States) TRG-AMR													17	DNS					4
44	(United States) Brett Meredith	(United States) GMG Racing															18				3
45	(United States) Jon Miller	(United States) GMG Racing																Ret			0
TC class entered drivers at the non-championship round at Road America
	(Canada) Nick Wittmer	(Canada) ST Racing									20	19									
	(United States) Cody Ellsworth	(United States) RacerInk Motorsports									**19**	Ret									
	(Serbia) Stefan Sajic	(United States) ZIMA Motorsports									22	20									
	(United States) Toby Grahovec	(United States) Classic BMW									21	24									
	(United States) Nick Barbato	(United States) GenRacer									27	**21**									
	(United States) Jeff Ricca	(United States) GenRacer									Ret	22									
	(Canada) Jayson Clunie	(United States) Classic BMW									23	26									
	(Serbia) Marko Radisic	(United States) ZIMA Motorsports									26	23									
	(United States) Max Fedler	(United States) Max Fedler Racing									24	25									
	(Canada) Samantha Tan	(Canada) ST Racing									25	Ret									
	(United States) Gino Carini	(United States) Classic BMW									28	27									
Pos.	Driver	Team	STP		VIR		MOS		LIM		ELK		MOH		UTA		AUS		SON		Points

==== GTSA ====
Pos.	Driver	Team	STP		VIR		MOS		LIM		ELK		MOH		UTA		AUS		SON		Points
1	(United States) George Kurtz	(United States) GMG Racing	12	8	DNS	Ret	8	9	9	9	7	**3**	4	9	6	4	10	10	4	9	360
2	(United States) Tony Gaples	(United States) Blackdog Speed Shop	7	7	DNS	12	**10**	10	12	8	11	13	13	10	11	Ret	11	14	11	6	319
3	(United States) Mark Klenin	(United States) KPR	11	Ret	9	10	19	18	**4**	**7**	9	6	15	13	10	13	14	13	10	10	314
4	(United States) Adam Merzon	(United States) Case-it Racing	13	12	11	13	14	16	14	13	14	16	11	14	12	7	15	18			243
5	(United States) Jason Bell	(United States) Racers Edge Motorsports	8	**15**	**12**	**6**	18	13	11	Ret	29	15	8	**12**	16	Ret	Ret	19			210
6	(United States) Bill Ziegler	(United States) ANSA Motorsports	15	13			15	14	Ret	12	30	17	12	15			16	Ret			133
7	(Canada) Cameron Cassels	(United States) Case-it Racing	16	10	Ret	7	12	17	13	11	18	Ret									123
8	(United States) Frank Gannett	(United States) Ian Lacy Racing									16	28			8	6	13	15	Ret	14	118
9	(United States) Carter Yeung	(United States) GMG Racing													13	9	12	12	13	12	108
10	(United States) Chris Beaufait	(United States) Racers Edge Motorsports			13	8					15	18			14	8					96
11	(United States) Bob Michaelian	(United States) Racers Edge Motorsports											9	11			20	11	12	Ret	94
12	(United States) Ari Balogh	(United States) Stephen Cameron Racing			7	Ret	7	11	DNS	14											83
13	(United States) Keith Jensen	(United States) NOLAsport									Ret	10			**15**	**10**	19	16			74
14	(Canada) Fred Roberts	(United States) JCR Motorsports					13	12			**12**	14	**Ret**	DNS							66
15	(United States) Alan Brynjolfsson	(United States) VOLT Racing					11	DNS	6	10											59
16	(United States) Derek DeBoer	(United States) TRG-AMR																	**4**	**7**	48
17	(United States) Chris Hall	(United States) VOLT Racing							8	3											46
18	(Canada) Martin Barkey	(Canada) Mantella Autosport	**5**	11																	42
19	(United States) Drew Staveley	(United States) Ian Lacy Racing									8	11									42
20	(United States) Harry Gottsacker	(United States) Performance Motorsports Group	18	5																	36
21	(United States) Ricco Shlaimoun	(United States) ANSA Motorsports			14	9															34
22	(United States) James Pesek	(United States) PF Racing									17		10								31
23	(United States) Cameron Maugeri	(United States) KRÜGSPEED	14	14																	27
24	(United States) Craig Lyons	(United States) TRG					17	15													25
25	(United States) Dakota Dickerson	(United States) ANSA Motorsports															**17**	**Ret**			13
26	(United States) Cody Ellsworth	(United States) CRP Racing															Ret	17			13
27	(Canada) Roman De Angelis	(United States) ANSA Motorsports					16	**DNS**													12
28	(United States) Brett Meredith	(United States) GMG Racing															18				12
29	(United States) Jason Alexandridis	(United States) TRG-AMR													17	DNS					11
30	(United States) Jon Miller	(United States) GMG Racing																Ret			0
Pos.	Driver	Team	STP		VIR		MOS		LIM		ELK		MOH		UTA		AUS		SON		Points

==== TC/TCA/TCB ====
Pos.	Driver	Team	VIR		MOS		LIM		UTA		AUS		LAG		Points
TC
1	(United States) Paul Holton	(Canada) C360R	1	2	**1**	**8**	**2**	**2**	**10**	**11**	10	8	**1**	**1**	235
2	(United States) Greg Liefooghe	(United States) Stephen Cameron Racing	**2**	1	9	7	Ret	18	1	1	**1**	13	2	2	208
3	(Canada) Nick Wittmer	(Canada) ST Racing	3	46	2	6	8	4	9	2	2	**1**	DSQ	6	190
4	(United States) Toby Grahovec	(United States) Classic BMW	17	15	5	10	4	8	2	3	4	2	5	5	190
5	(United States) Mason Filippi	(United States) Winding Road Team TFB	16	14	13	1	5	6	8	5	6	5	6	4	173
6	(United States) Anthony Magagnoli	(United States) Rooster Hall Racing	12	12	6	5	9	5	3	6	3	37	Ret	7	150
7	(United States) Tony Rivera	(United States) Brass Monkey Racing	22	48	11	3	7	9	6	Ret	7	7	4	8	132
8	(United States) JT Coupal	(United States) BERG Racing	8	10	10	2	12	7	Ret	13	13	10	8	11	131
9	(United States) Ari Balogh	(United States) Stephen Cameron Racing	6	7	8	15	19	23	11	4	Ret	9	7	9	118
10	(United States) Anthony Geraci	(United States) S.A.C. Racing	4	**4**	7	11	13	15	37	15	19	38	19	12	96
11	(Canada) Karl Wittmer	(Canada) Honda Ste-Rose Racing	7	17	3	18	27	14	7	7	23	40	21	Ret	80
12	(Serbia) Stefan Sajic	(United States) ZIMA Motorsports	10	5	21	Ret	Ret	27	12	16	9	4			73
13	(United States) John Weisberg	(United States) BERG Racing	Ret	Ret	19	4	6	10			11	29	12	15	72
14	(United States) Rodrigo Sales	(United States) Stephen Cameron Racing	5	9	Ret	14	20	24	Ret	DNS	12	36	11	16	62
15	(United States) Cody Ellsworth	(United States) RacerInk Motorsports	44	3	4	38	28	3							61
16	(United States) Robert Nimkoff	(United States) AutoTechnic Racing	9	6	15	19	11	21	Ret	35	Ret	12			57
17	(United States) Jacob Ruud	(United States) Winding Road Team TFB					26	20	4	17	8	6			52
18	(United States) Chris Ohmacht	(United States) Classic BMW	15	11	22	24	Ret	Ret	15	20	16	11	14	17	50
19	(United States) Justin Raphael	(United States) Classic BMW	13	42	12	13	18	17	17	10					48
20	(United States) Henry Schmitt	(United States) Stephen Cameron Racing	14	13	14	20	21	30	Ret	DNS	15	15	13	19	48
21	(United States) Dane Cameron	(United States) Turner Motorsport					3	1							46
22	(Brazil) Pierre Kleinubing	(United States) Classic BMW											3	3	42
23	(United States) Matt Travis	(United States) Classic BMW									5	3			38
24	(Canada) Jayson Clunie	(United States) Classic BMW					23	26	5	21			9	18	32
25	(United States) Travis Washay	(United States) Indian Summer Racing							13	Ret	39	17	10	14	30
26	(United States) Cameron Maugeri	(United States) KRÜGSPEED	11	8	16	DNS									28
27	(United States) Elivan Goulart	(United States) KRÜGSPEED					1	Ret							25
28	(United States) Jeff Ricca	(United States) GenRacer	DNS	Ret	17	9	14	19			37	Ret			25
29	(Canada) Samantha Tan	(Canada) ST Racing	21	21	23	23	25	28	23	Ret	14	14	15	20	23
30	(United States) Dennis Hanratty Jr.	(United States) KRÜGSPEED	19	20	18	21	17	12							22
31	(United States) Randy Pobst	(United States) ZIMA Motorsports					10	11							21
32	(United States) Steve Burns	(United States) Ian Lacy Racing							14	8					20
33	(United States) Shea Holbrook	(United States) Shea Racing	20	16	20	29	16	16							17
34	(United States) Daren Jorgensen	(United States) Rearden Racing							20	12	22	23	16	Ret	16
35	(United States) Jeff Kearl	(United States) Rearden Racing							18	9					15
36	(United States) Johan Schwartz	(United States) AutoTechnic Racing											17	10	15
37	(United States) Will Turner	(United States) Turner Motorsport					15	13							14
38	(United States) Max Fedler	(United States) Max Fedler Racing							16	14					12
39	(United States) Nicolai Elghanayan	(United States) Muellerized											Ret	13	8
40	(United States) Dan Honovich	(United States) GenRacer									18	16			8
41	(United States) Randy Hale	(United States) Hale Motorsports	18	50			24	22			17	Ret	DNS	DNS	7
42	(United States) Joshua Foran	(United States) Team HMA	Ret	18			22	25			38	DNS	20	22	4
43	(United States) Derek Kulach	(United States) Zorro Racing									20	18			4
44	(United States) Gino Carini	(United States) Classic BMW	23	19							21	19			4
45	(United States) Scott Thomas	(United States) AutoTechnic Racing											18	21	3
46	(United States) Andrew McCubbins	(United States) Rearden Racing							22	18					3
47	(United States) Greg Warnock	(United States) Rearden Racing							21	19					2
48	(India) Chetan Puranik	(United States) ZIMA Motorsports	Ret	47	40	26			19	Ret	Ret	Ret			2
49	(United States) John Allen	(United States) BERG Racing	Ret	49	39	Ret	DNS	29							0
50	(United States) Andrew Rains	(United States) Rains Racing	Ret	33											0
51	(United States) Steve Kohli	(United States) Parallax Racing	Ret	45											0
52	(United States) Mark Drennan	(United States) Hooverspeed											DSQ	Ret	0
53	(United States) Jason Fichter	(United States) Shea Racing	Ret	DNS											0
TCA
1	(United States) Matt Fassnacht	(United States) S.A.C. Racing	**24**	**22**	26	17	5	2	28	23	25	30	5	4	245
2	(United States) Elivan Goulart	(United States) S.A.C. Racing	25	25	25	16	**1**	**1**	25	Ret	26	28	7	6	226
3	(United States) Tom O'Gorman	(United States) Shea Racing	32	32	27	**12**	10	3	29	24	28	24	3	2	215
4	(United States) Eric Powell	(United States) Tech Sport Racing	26	26	29	27	2	4	DNS	DSQ	**Ret**	**39**	**1**	**DSQ**	150
5	(United States) Daniel Moen	(United States) S.A.C. Racing	34	36	31	30	8	8	32	29	30	27	9	8	147
6	(United States) Kenny Murillo	(United States) Murillo Racing							27	**22**	24	20	2	1	143
7	(United States) Jeff Sexton	(United States) Winding Road Team TFB	45	30	WD	WD			Ret	26	27	21	4	3	118
8	(United States) Dean Copeland	(United States) Copeland Motorsports	42	23	**24**	25	3	5							112
9	(United States) Shea Holbrook	(United States) Shea Racing							**24**	34	29	25	6	5	102
10	(United States) Brian Henderson	(United States) Copeland Motorsports	29	24			4	6							70
11	(United States) Daniel Williams	(United States) S.A.C. Racing							31	27					49
11	(United States) Daniel Williams	(United States) Tech Sport Racing									Ret	22			49
12	(United States) Paul Whiting	(United States) PWR	31	27			6	Ret							43
12	(United States) Paul Whiting	(Puerto Rico) Glory Racing							Ret						43
13	(United States) Craig Stanton	(United States) DG-Spec Racing							26	25					40
14	(Canada) Éric Laporte	(Canada) Lapse Motorsport			30	28	Ret	19							38
15	(United States) Kevin Anderson	(United States) Tech Sport Racing	35	35	Ret	DNS	11	10					Ret	DNS	38
16	(Canada) Gary Kwok	(Canada) M&S Racing			28	22									36
17	(United States) Spencer Patterson	(United States) Patterson Racing	27	28	WD	WD									33
18	(United States) Sarah Montgomery	(United States) Shea Racing	28	31	WD	WD									28
19	(United States) Richard Astacio	(United States) S.A.C. Racing					7	7							28
20	(United States) Breton Williams	(United States) Tech Sport Racing							30	28					28
21	(United States) Cameron Parsons	(United States) DSPORT Magazine											8	7	27
22	(United States) Steve Streimer	(United States) Tech Sport Racing					9	9							24
23	(United States) Michael Johnson	(United States) Tech Sport Racing	30	51											20
24	(Puerto Rico) Glory Fernandez	(Puerto Rico) Glory Racing	33	34						DNS					20
25	(United States) Keith Jensen	(United States) NOLAsport									Ret	26			15
26	(United States) Jason Connole	(United States) Rossini Racing Products	Ret	29											13
TCB
1	(Canada) P. J. Groenke	(United States) Tech Sport Racing	37	41	33	33	14	12	33	**31**	32	**35**	10	9	268
2	(United States) Jake Pipal	(United States) Jake Pipal Racing	**38**	38	32	**31**	13	14	36	33	34	31	11	10	266
3	(United States) Canaan O'Connell	(United States) Tech Sport Racing	36	**39**	**DSQ**	32	**12**	**11**	**34**	30	**31**	34	**12**	15	253
4	(United States) Jasper Drengler	(United States) Drengler Racing	41	43	38	36	17	17	35	32	35	33	14	11	206
5	(United States) Ted Sahley	(United States) Believeland Motorsport	43	44	37	37	18	16			33	41			122
6	(United States) Travis Washay	(United States) Indian Summer Racing	40	37	34	34	15	15							118
7	(United States) Taylor Handwerk	(United States) Indian Summer Racing	39	40	35	35	16	13							112
8	(United States) Blake Thompson	(United States) ISellMiataParts	WD	WD	36	Ret	19	18			36	32			81
9	(Canada) Damon Surzyshyn	(United States) Hale Motorsports											13	13	36
10	(United States) James Wilson	(United States) Black Armor Helmets											15	12	34
11	(United States) Stephanie Andersen	(United States) Black Armor Helmets											16	14	29
Pos.	Driver	Team	VIR		MOS		LIM		UTA		AUS		LAG		Points

=== Manufacturers' championships ===
Only those manufacturers who are SCCA Pro Racing corporate members were eligible to receive points toward the Manufacturers' championship. Points were awarded based on finishing positions as shown in the chart below. Only the highest finishing car of each eligible manufacturer earned points for its finishing position.

Position	**1st**	**2nd**	**3rd**	**4th**	**5th**	**6th**	**7th**	**8th**	**9th**	**Pole**
Points	10	8	7	6	5	4	3	2	1	1

==== GT ====
Pos.	Manufacturer	Car	STP		LBH	VIR		MOS	LIM		ELK		MOH		UTA		AUS			SON		Points
1	(Germany) Porsche	911 GT3 R	3	1	2	3	15	**2**	**1**	**11**	2	1	5	2	3	6	1	3	**2**	3	**2**	137
2	(United States) Cadillac	ATS-V.R	4	2	14	4	3	1	4	2	3	3	2	7	4	3	4	**2**	7	1	1	127
3	(United Kingdom) McLaren	650S GT3	1	4	**1**	16	2	7	3	3	6	6	**1**	**1**	6	4	8	4	4	2	4	120
4	(Italy) Ferrari	458 Italia GT3; 488 GT3	**6**	**3**	4	1	4	13	16	10	4	4	6	4	2	**1**	2	1	15	**5**	15	100
5	(Germany) Mercedes-Benz	AMG GT3	16	7	6	5	**1**	6	6	9	15	9	7	9	9	8	**3**	5	1	6	5	72
6	(Germany) Audi	R8 LMS; R8 LMS ultra	18	15	8	**2**	5	5	2	1	11	11	12	16	13	9	6	10	3	4	3	64
7	(Japan) Acura	NSX GT3	8	8	11	19	11	9	5	5	5	8	10	6	**1**	2	9	7	6	9	7	57
8	(United Kingdom) Bentley	Continental GT3	11	16	17	8	8	4	9	4	**1**	**2**			7	27	7	15	Ret			43
9	(Japan) Nissan	GT-R Nismo GT3				Ret	20	14	11	12					21	13	12	17	DNS			0
Manufacturers ineligible to score GT class points
	(United Kingdom) Aston Martin	V12 Vantage GT3	2	19	19	12	21	23	18	17	20	19	17	18				23	23			
	(Italy) Lamborghini	Huracán GT3			12	13	9															
Pos.	Manufacturer	Car	STP		LBH	VIR		MOS	LIM		ELK		MOH		UTA		AUS			SON		Points

==== GTS ====
Pos.	Manufacturer	Car	STP		VIR		MOS		LIM		ELK		MOH		UTA		AUS		SON		Points
1	(United States) Chevrolet	Camaro GT4.R	**2**	2	3	3	3	2	5	2	2	2	1	**2**	9	5	5	9	6	1	120
2	(United States) Panoz	Avezzano GT	Ret	Ret	6	4	21	4	2	15	**1**	1	2	1	3	1	**1**	Ret	**1**	**2**	111
3	(Germany) Porsche	Cayman GT4 Clubsport MR; Cayman GTS	4	6	5	7	9	6	1	1	5	4	6	8	**1**	3	3	1	5	3	107
4	(United Kingdom) Ginetta	G55 GT4	17	3							6	7	**3**	3	5	2	2	**2**	3	5	71
5	(United States) Ford	Mustang Boss 302R; Mustang GT4	1	**1**			2	Ret	8	3	17	5	10	4							49
Manufacturers ineligible to score GTS class points
	(Austria) KTM	X-Bow GT4	5	4	1	**1**	**4**	3	**7**	**5**	4	**9**	7	7	4	11	8	6	2	13	
	(Bulgaria) SIN	R1 GT4	3	15	12	6	1	**1**	11	Ret	15	8	8	11	14	8	20	11	12	Ret	
	(Italy) Maserati	GranTurismo MC GT4			**2**	2	6	5			3	14	14	6	2	**12**	6	3			
	(United Kingdom) McLaren	570S GT4	11	8	9	10	8	9	4	7	7	3	4	9	6	4	10	10	10	9	
	(United Kingdom) Aston Martin	Vantage GT4			7	Ret									17	DNS			4	7	
	(Germany) BMW	M3 E92					7	11	DNS	14											
	(United Kingdom) Lotus	Evora GT4															DSQ	7			
Pos.	Manufacturer	Car	STP		VIR		MOS		LIM		ELK		MOH		UTA		AUS		SON		Points

==== TC/TCA ====
Pos.	Manufacturer	Car	VIR		MOS		LIM		UTA		AUS		LAG		Points
TC
1	(Germany) BMW	M235iR	**2**	1	2	1	3	1	1	1	**1**	**1**	2	2	112
2	(Germany) Audi	RS 3 LMS	1	**2**	**1**	**2**	**2**	**2**	**10**	**11**	10	8	**1**	**1**	83
3	(Japan) Nissan	370Z	22	48	11	3	7	9	6	Ret	7	7	4	8	29
4	(Japan) Honda	Accord V6 Coupe	7	16	3	18	16	14	7	7	23	40	20	22	16
5	(Japan) Mazda	MX-5	18	50	19	4	6	10			11	29	12	15	10
Manufacturers ineligible to score TC class points
	(United Kingdom) Lotus	Exige; Exige (2016)	11	8	16	21	1	12					Ret	13	
	(Germany) Porsche	Cayman	44	3	4	38	28	3							
	(United States) Ford	Mustang							14	8					
	(South Korea) Hyundai	Genesis Coupe	DNS	Ret	17	9	14	19			18	16			
TCA
1	(Japan) Mazda	MX-5; MX-5 Cup	**24**	**22**	**24**	16	**1**	**1**	25	**22**	24	20	2	1	120
2	(Japan) Honda	Civic Si; Civic Si (2017)	28	27	27	**12**	6	3	**24**	24	28	24	3	2	66
Manufacturers ineligible to score TCA class points
	(United States) Scion	FR-S	35	35	Ret	DNS	11	10	30	28	**Ret**	**22**	**1**	**DSQ**	
	(Japan) Toyota	TMG 86 Cup Car							26	25					
Pos.	Manufacturer	Car	VIR		MOS		LIM		UTA		AUS		LAG		Points
