= Panoz Avezzano =

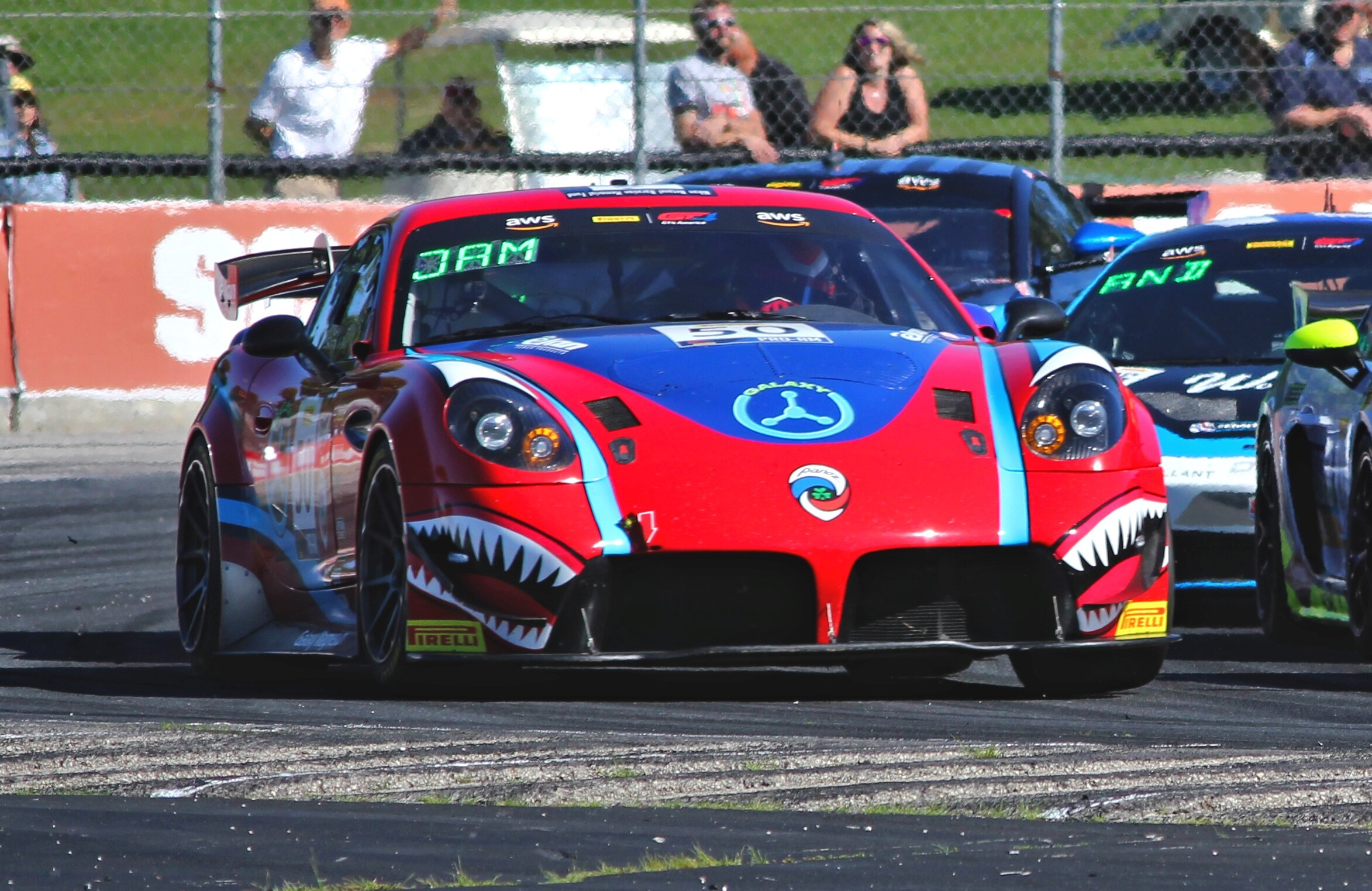
- Panoz Avezzano racecar on track at Road America

Overview
- Manufacturer: Panoz, LLC
- Production: 2017–present
- Assembly: Hoschton, Georgia, United States

Body and chassis
- Class: Grand tourer (S)
- Body style: 2-door coupé
- Layout: FR layout

Powertrain
- Engine: 6.2 L Panoz, LLC NA V8; 6.2 L Panoz, LLC supercharged V8
- Transmission: 6-speed manual

Dimensions
- Wheelbase: 106 in (2,700 mm)
- Length: 181.1 in (4,600 mm)
- Width: 79.3 in (2,010 mm)
- Height: 52.1 in (1,320 mm)
- Curb weight: 3,197 lb (1,450 kg)

Chronology
- Predecessor: Panoz Esperante

The Panoz Avezzano is an American front-engine, rear-drive, V8-powered sports car manufactured in Georgia by Panoz, LLC. Intended for sale both as a road car and as a homologated racing vehicle, the racing-configured Avezzano GT4 was first entered in competition in 2017 in the Pirelli World Challenge, while the street version of the automobile was first offered for sale during the summer of 2017.

== History ==
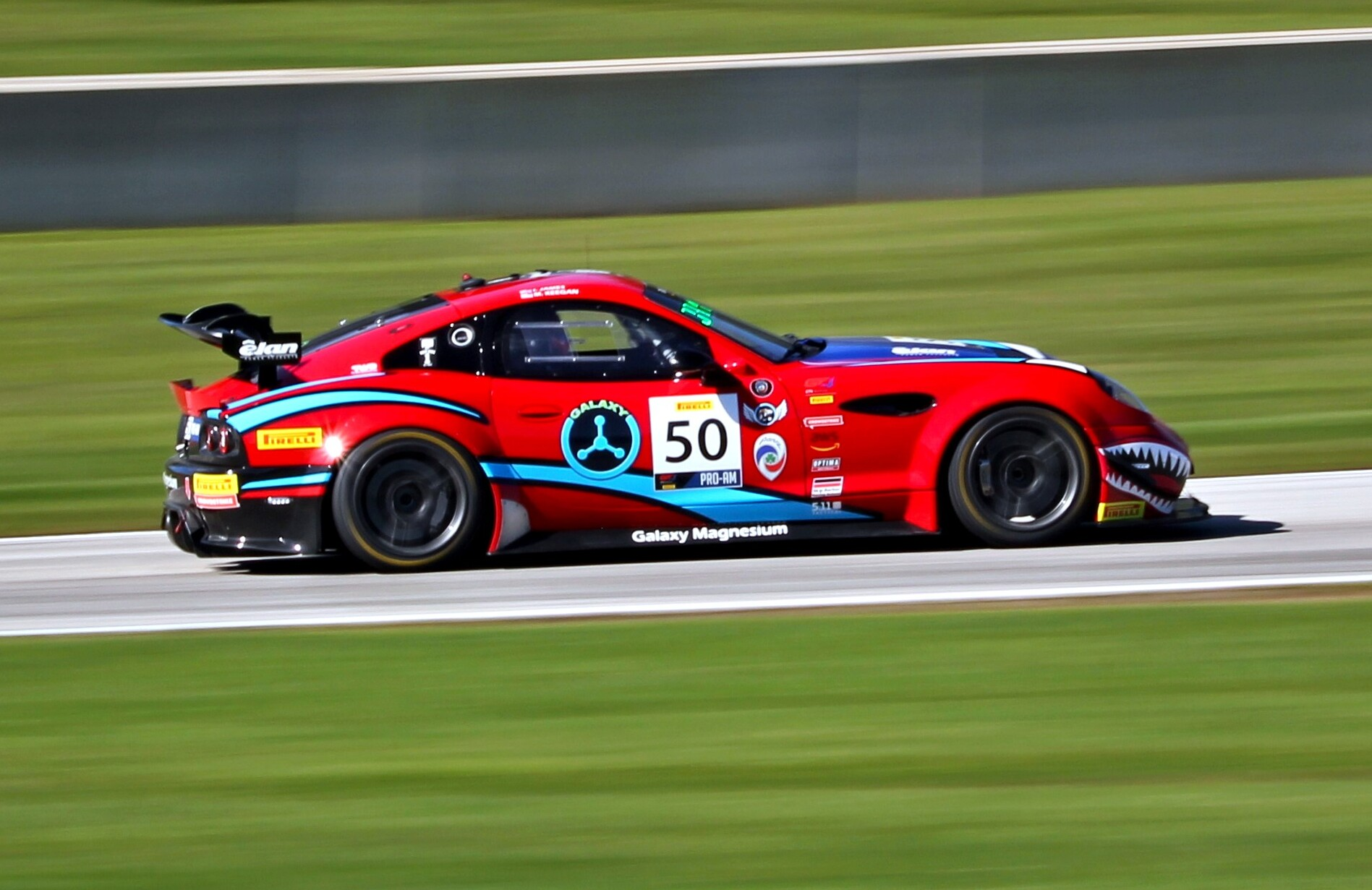
Panoz Avezzano racecar on track at Road America

The Panoz Avezzano is named after the city of Avezzano in Italy, which was destroyed by an earthquake in 1915, the destruction spurring the emigration of Don Panoz's grandfather to America. Developed from the preceding Panoz Esperante, the Avezzano was unveiled at the 2016 Petit Le Mans, and appeared at the first annual Atlanta Concours d'Elegance. Using largely aluminium construction, the Avezzano is configured with a front-engine, rear-wheel-drive layout, with a Chevrolet V8 engine providing power through a manual transmission.

The Avezzano's GT4 racing version was the first model of the car to be introduced, being used by Team Panoz Racing in the Pirelli World Challenge for the 2017 racing season. Ian James scored the first victory for the Avezzano in the World Challenge at Road America in June; James accumulated a total of six wins in the Avezzano over the course of the season, and the team shifted from the GTS class to GT4 for 2018 following homologation as a production vehicle.

The street version of the Avezzano entered production in early 2017, with sales beginning in the summer of that year.
