= China Formula Grand Prix =

Single-Seater Racing Championship

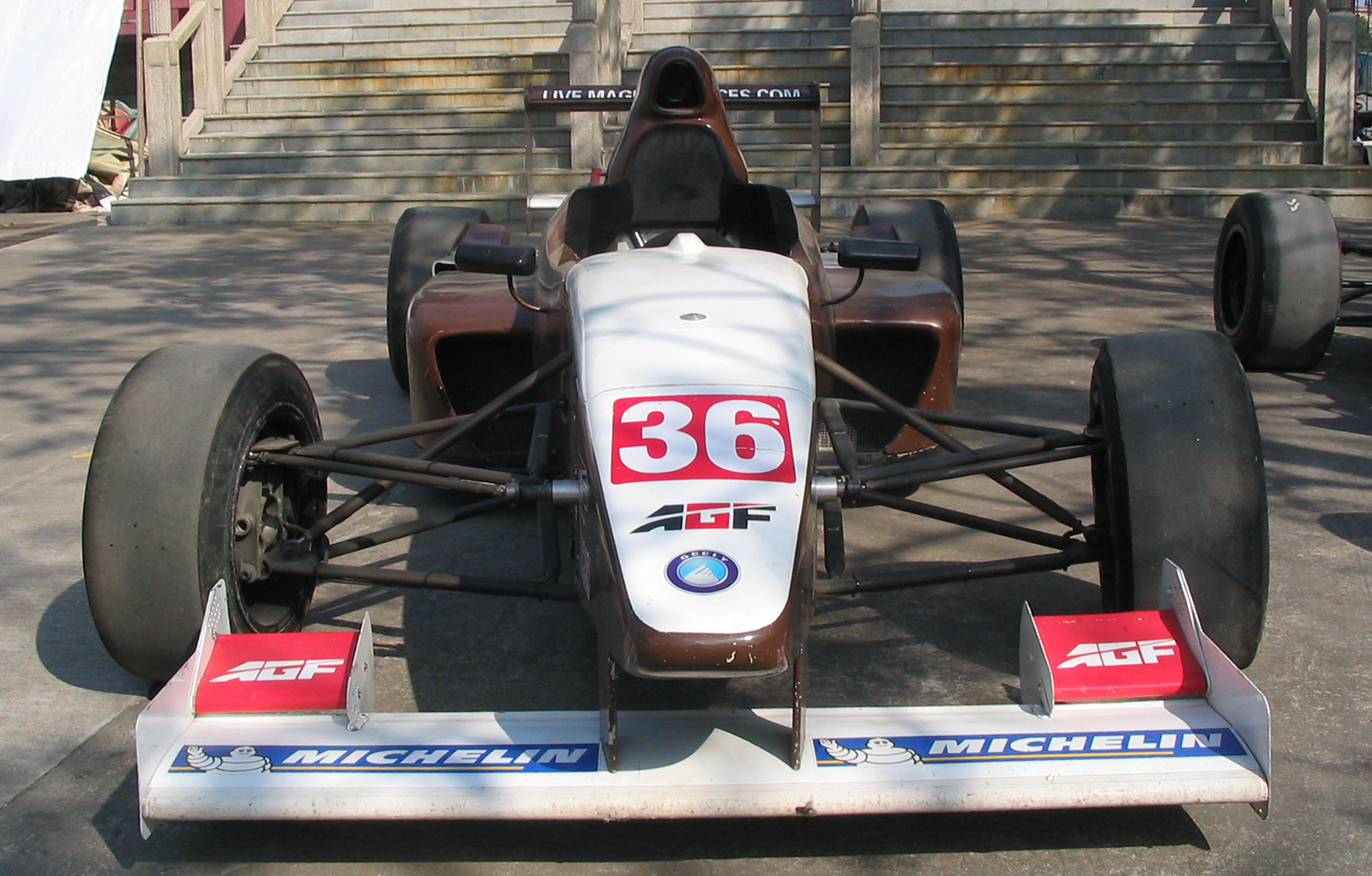
Formula Geely

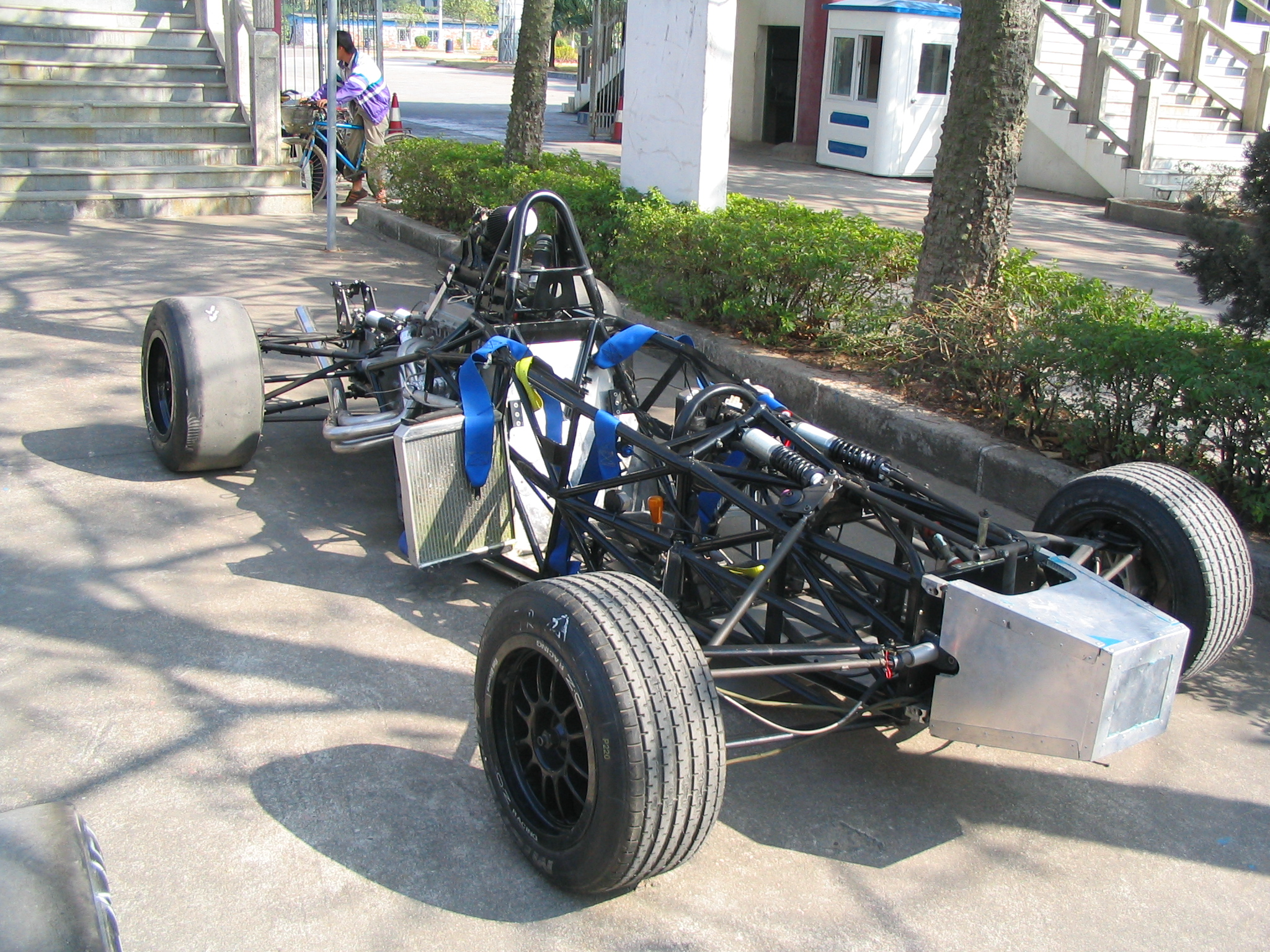
Formula Geely chassis

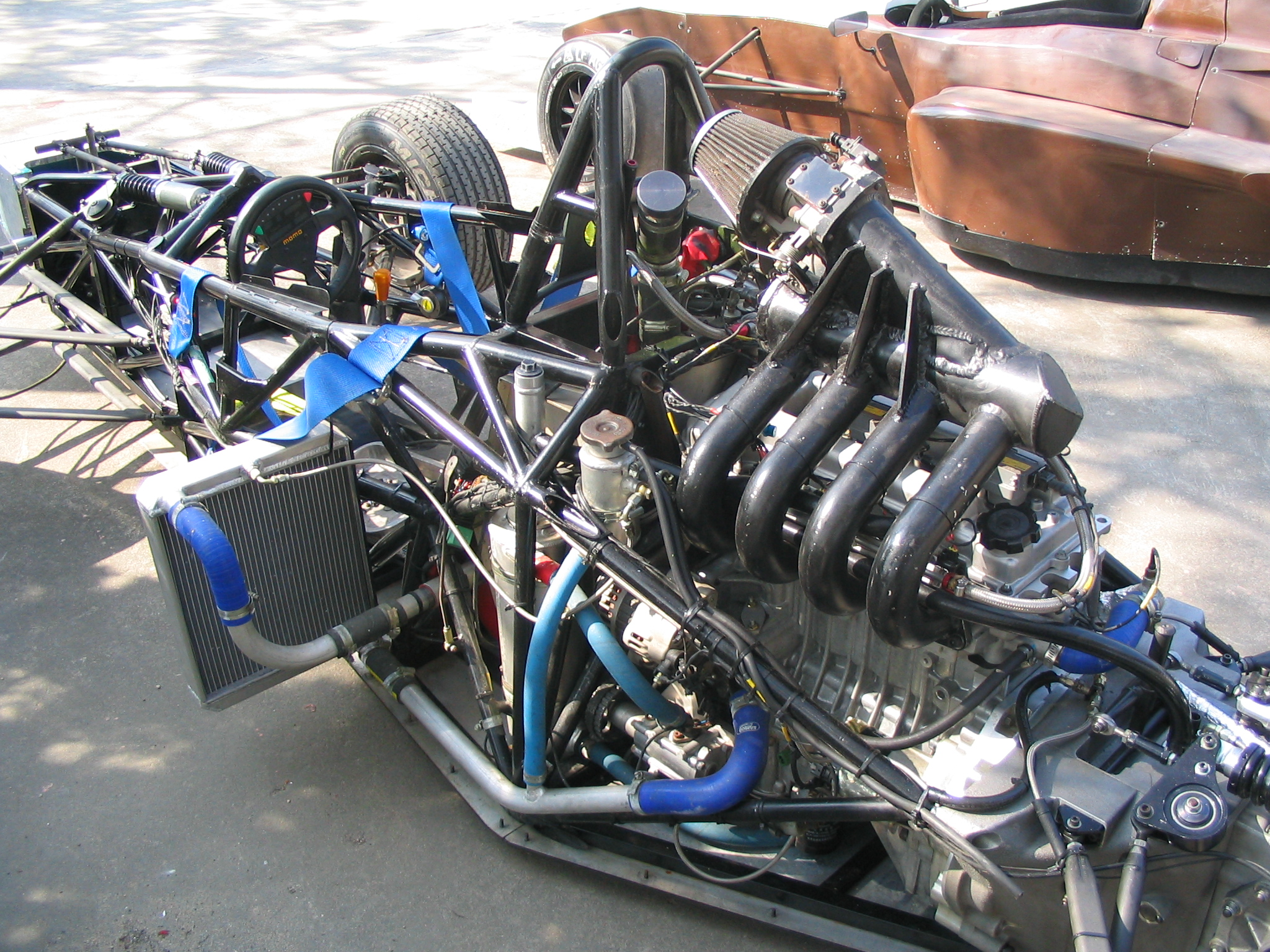
Formula Geely engine

China Formula Grand Prix (CFGP) (Chinese: 中国方程式大奖赛), formerly known as Asian Geely Formula International Open Competition, is an open wheel formula racing class in China.

The car, co-designed by Geely, China's biggest private-owned vehicle producer and racing cars production company Van Diemen, marks the first time that a Chinese domestic car producer is involved in the racing car design.

CFGP uses a 1.8-litre 4G18 engine; the car weighs 490 kg and has a maximum speed of 240 km/h. The engine can produce 140 bhp at 6,300 rpm and 172 N/m of torque at 4,100 rpm. After an adjustment to the ECU, the engine can rev up to 8,500 rpm producing 200 bhp.

== Promotion ==
In 2008, reports of the AGF Sepang race appeared on Reuters's huge electronic TV screen at Times Square in New York City.

== 2011 season calendar ==
1. 11–12 June Chengdu International Circuit, Chengdu
2. 13-14 Aug Ordos International Circuit, Ordos
3. 15-16 Oct Goldenport Park Circuit, Beijing
4. 19-20 Nov Guangdong International Circuit, Zhaoqing

== 2012 season calendar ==
Official Testing 1–2 May Guangdong International Circuit, Zhaoqing

1. 19–20 May Guangdong International Circuit, Zhaoqing
2. 28–29 July Ordos International Circuit, Ordos
3. 18-19 Aug Goldenport Park Circuit, Beijing
4. 17-18 Nov Chengdu International Circuit, Chengdu
