= Chengdu Goldenport Circuit =

Motorsport race track in China

- Full Circuit (2007–2019)
- Location: Chengdu, People's Republic of China
- Coordinates: 30°35′5″N 104°6′57″E
- Opened: 14 September 2007; 18 years ago
- Closed: August 2019; 7 years ago
- Major events: F4 China (2016–2018); CFGP (2011–2018); Clio Cup China (2009, 2013–2015); CTCC (2010–2013); CSBK (2010); A1 Grand Prix (2008); Porsche Carrera Cup Asia (2007); Formula Renault AsiaCup (2007, 2009–2010); ATCS (2007); Formula V6 Asia (2007); Formula BMW Asia (2007)

Full Circuit (2007–2019)
- Length: 3.367 km (2.092 mi)
- Turns: 13
- Race lap record: 1:15.212 ( (Netherlands) Robert Doornbos, A1GP Powered by Ferrari car, 2008, A1GP)

Chengdu Goldenport Circuit (simplified Chinese: 成都国际赛车场; traditional Chinese: 成都國際賽車場) also known as Chengdu International Circuit in English, was a permanent circuit in Shi Sheng Road, Jin Jiang, 610023 Chengdu, People's Republic of China.

It held a round of Asian Touring Car Series (ATCS), Formula V6 Asia in 2007 and 2008.

On August 26 2008, the circuit was confirmed to be hosting a round of the 2008-09 A1 Grand Prix season. It was the fourth different circuit in China to have hosted an A1 Grand Prix race. The track hosted the second round of the Grand Prix season on 9 November 2008, the Sprint race was won by Adam Carroll of Team Ireland and the Feature race was won by Filipe Albuquerque of Team Portugal. The fastest lap at the circuit was set by Robert Doornbos of Team The Netherlands, who managed a lap of 1:15.212.

In August 2019, the venue was announced to be demolished. According to renowned F1 journalist Joe Saward, plans are for a redevelopment of the circuit to be FIA Grade 1 in order to start work towards a second Formula One race in China.

== The circuit ==
The circuit was 3.367 km (2.092 mi) long. A1 Grand Prix's track commentator Bruce Jones compared the bumpy circuit to Spain's Circuito Permanente del Jarama and Portugal's Autódromo do Estoril. He suggested the main straight is longer than the one at Circuit Park Zandvoort, before plunging under a bridge. Another A1GP track commentator John Watson believed that the bumps are the consequence of the track's location in an earthquake zone.

A1 Team Australia's driver John Martin said driving on the track was like "old Mario Kart on Nintendo" because the bumps on the circuit made his car jump. There were puddles on the circuit which never dried up during the weekend and they caused spins. He also said that the surface is not ideal because the water was rising to the surface, as the track was built on part of a swamp.

== Lap records ==
The fastest official race lap records at the Chengdu Goldenport Circuit are listed as:

Category	Time	Driver	Vehicle	Event
Full Circuit (2007–2019): 3.367 km (2.092 mi)
A1GP	1:15.212	Robert Doornbos	A1GP Powered by Ferrari car	2008 Chengdu A1GP round
Formula Renault 3.5	1:25.544	James Winslow	Tatuus FRV6	2007 Chengdu Formula V6 Asia round
Formula 4	1:30.358	Bruno Carneiro	Mygale M14-F4	2016 Chengdu F4 China round
Formula BMW	1:30.688	Kyle Mitchell	Mygale FB02	2007 Chengdu Formula BMW Asia round
Porsche Carrera Cup	1:38.729	Christian Jones	Porsche 911 (997 I) GT3 Cup	2007 Chengdu Porsche Carrera Cup Asia round
Super 2000	1:39.011	Fariqe Hairuman	BMW 320i	2007 Chengdu ATCS round
