= 2018 Pirelli World Challenge =

Motor racing competition

The 2018 Pirelli World Challenge is the 29th season of the Pirelli World Challenge. Patrick Long was the defending champion in the highest class, the GT class. It is the second season sanctioned by the United States Auto Club. The season began on 9 March in St. Petersburg and ended on 2 September at Watkins Glen. It is the first season of the new TCR class, while the TCB class has been removed from the series.

On 25 May 2018, the series announced it had been acquired by the SRO Motorsports Group.

Pirelli was not only a title sponsor it was also the tire supplier for The 2018 Pirelli World Challenge Championship.

== Calendar ==
On 17 November 2017, WC Vision announced the 2018 calendar. Circuit of the Americas will be the SprintX season opener instead of Virginia. Mid-Ohio and Sonoma were dropped from the schedule in favor of Portland and Watkins Glen. Laguna Seca, which played host for the Touring Car classes season finale weekend in 2017, will not return to the series.

Round	Event	Circuit	Date	Classes	Supporting
1	Grand Prix of St. Petersburg	(United States) Streets of St. Petersburg, St. Petersburg, Florida	9–11 March	GT/GTA/GT Cup (x2); GTS/GTSA (x2)	IndyCar Series
2	Grand Prix of Texas	(United States) Circuit of the Americas, Elroy, Texas	23–25 March	SprintX GT (x2); SprintX GTS (x2); TCR/TCA (x2); TC (x2)	Headliner
3	Grand Prix of Long Beach	(United States) Streets of Long Beach, Long Beach, California	13–15 April	GT/GTA/GT4/GT4A (Note: GTS(A) cars were added on an invitational basis for Long Beach. The class was named GT4(A) for this round. Drivers competing in GT4(A) were ineligible to score points.)	IndyCar Series; WeatherTech SportsCar Championship
4	Grand Prix of Virginia presented by Audi Sport	(United States) Virginia International Raceway, Alton, Virginia	27–29 April	SprintX GT (x2); SprintX GTS (x2); TCR/TCA (x2); TC (x2)	Headliner
5	Victoria Day Speedfest at Canadian Tire Motorsport Park	(Canada) Canadian Tire Motorsport Park, Bowmanville, Ontario	18–20 May	GT/GTA/GT Cup (x2); GTS/GTSA (x2)	Co-Headliner with NASCAR Pinty's Series
6	Grand Prix of Lime Rock powered by M	(United States) Lime Rock Park, Lakeville, Connecticut	25–26, 28 May	SprintX GT (x2); SprintX GTS (x2); TCR/TCA (x2); TC (x2)	Headliner
7	Grand Prix of Road America	(United States) Road America, Elkhart Lake, Wisconsin	22–24 June	GT/GTA/GT Cup/GTS/GTSA (x2)	IndyCar Series
8	58th Rose Cup Races	(United States) Portland International Raceway, Portland, Oregon	13–15 July	SprintX GT (x2); SprintX GTS (x2); TCR/TCA (x2); TC (x2)	Headliner
9	Grand Prix of Utah	(United States) Utah Motorsports Campus, Tooele, Utah	10–12 August	SprintX GT (x2); SprintX GTS (x2); TCR/TCA (x2); TC (x2)	Headliner
10	Grand Prix of Watkins Glen	(United States) Watkins Glen International, Watkins Glen, New York	31 August–2 September	GT/GTA/GT Cup (x2); GTS/GTSA (x2); TCR/TCA (x2); TC (x2)	Headliner

== Entry list ==
=== GT/GTA/GT Cup ===
Team	Car	No.	Drivers	Rounds
(United States) TRG	Aston Martin V12 Vantage GT3	00	(United States) Spencer Pumpelly	1
(Italy) Squadra Corse Garage Italia	Ferrari 488 GT3	07	(Mexico) Martin Fuentes	All
(United States) CRP Racing	Mercedes-AMG GT3	2	(Canada) Daniel Morad	1, 3, 5, 7
(United States) CRP Racing	Mercedes-AMG GT3	2	(United States) Michael Cooper	10
(United States) K-PAX Racing	Bentley Continental GT3	3	(Brazil) Rodrigo Baptista	All
(United States) K-PAX Racing	Bentley Continental GT3	9	(Portugal) Álvaro Parente	All
(United States) Black Swan Racing	Porsche 911 GT3 R	12	(Australia) David Calvert-Jones	3
(United States) Black Swan Racing	Porsche 911 GT3 R	54	(United States) Tim Pappas	3
(United States) TruSpeed AutoSport	Audi R8 LMS	19	(United States) Parker Chase	1, 3, 5, 7
(United States) TruSpeed AutoSport	Audi R8 LMS	71	(United States) Rocky Moran Jr.	3
(United States) Nissan Motorsports North America	Nissan GT-R Nismo GT3 (2018)	22	(United States) Bryan Heikotter	3
(United States) Nissan Motorsports North America	Nissan GT-R Nismo GT3 (2018)	75	(United States) Steve Doherty	3
(United States) Alegra Motorsports	Porsche 911 GT3 R	24	(Denmark) Michael Christensen	All
(United States) Callaway Competition USA	Corvette C7 GT3-R	26	(Germany) Daniel Keilwitz	1-2
(United States) Dream Racing Motorsport	Lamborghini Huracán LP 620-2 Super Trofeo	27	(United States) Ryan Hardwick	7
(United States) Dream Racing Motorsport	Lamborghini Huracán GT3	55	(Japan) Yuki Harata	1, 3, 5, 7
(United States) TR3 Racing	Ferrari 488 GT3	31	(Italy) Daniel Mancinelli	All
(United States) GMG Racing	Porsche 911 GT3 R	41	(United States) Alec Udell	3
(United States) DXDT Racing	Lamborghini Huracán GT3	45	(United States) Lawrence DeGeorge	7
(United States) DXDT Racing	Mercedes-AMG GT3	63	(United States) David Askew	7, 10
(United States) Flying Lizard Motorsports	Porsche 911 GT3 R	46	(United States) Andy Wilzoch	7
(Canada) R. Ferri Motorsport	Ferrari 488 GT3	61	(Finland) Toni Vilander	All
(United States) Always Evolving Motorsport	Nissan GT-R Nismo GT3 (2018)	73	(United Kingdom) Craig Dolby	3
(United States) Always Evolving Motorsport	Nissan GT-R Nismo GT3 (2018)	75	(United Kingdom) Martin Plowman	3
(United States) Wright Motorsports	Porsche 911 GT3 R	91	(United States) Anthony Imperato	7, 10
(United States) RealTime Racing/HART Racing	Acura NSX GT3	93	(Germany) Mario Farnbacher	10
(Canada) Pfaff Motorsports	Porsche 911 GT3 R	96	(Canada) Scott Hargrove	All

Colour	Class
	GT
	GTA
	GT Cup

=== GTS/GTSA ===
Team	Car	No.	Drivers	Rounds
(United States) GMG Racing	Audi R8 LMS GT4	04	(United States) George Kurtz	All *
(United States) GMG Racing	Audi R8 LMS GT4	2	(United States) Jason Bell	7, 10
(United States) GMG Racing	Audi R8 LMS GT4	14	(United States) James Sofronas	All
(United States) Blackdog Racing	Chevrolet Camaro GT4.R	1	(United States) Lawson Aschenbach	All
(United States) Blackdog Racing	Chevrolet Camaro GT4.R	11	(United States) Tony Gaples	All
(United States) M1 GT Racing	Audi R8 LMS GT4	2	(United States) Jason Bell	1, 5
(United States) Black Swan Racing	Porsche Cayman GT4 Clubsport MR	7	(United States) Jeff Ward	*
(United States) PF Racing	Ford Mustang GT4	10	(United States) Vinnie Allegretta	1, 5, 7
(United States) PF Racing	Ford Mustang GT4	10	(United States) Patrick Gallagher	10
(United States) PF Racing	Ford Mustang GT4	40	(United States) James Pesek	All
(United States) PF Racing	Ford Mustang GT4	55	(United States) Jade Buford	All
(United States) Ian Lacy Racing	Ginetta G55 GT4	12	(United States) Drew Staveley	All
(United States) Ian Lacy Racing	Ginetta G55 GT4	24	(United States) Frank Gannett	All
(United States) Ian Lacy Racing	Ginetta G55 GT4	43	(United States) Steve Burns	1, 7
(Canada) Pfaff Motorsports	Porsche Cayman GT4 Clubsport MR	13	(Canada) Orey Fidani	All
(United States) Classic BMW	BMW M4 GT4	17	(United States) Justin Raphael	1
(United States) Classic BMW	BMW M4 GT4	26	(United States) Toby Grahovec	1
(United States) Classic BMW	BMW M4 GT4	92	(United States) Chris Ohmacht	1
(Belgium) Mühlner Motorsports America	Porsche Cayman GT4 Clubsport MR	21	(Switzerland) Gabriele Piana	1
(United States) Precision Driving	BMW M4 GT4	22	(Serbia) Marko Radisic	1, 7
(United States) / Case-it Racing by Flying Lizard (Note: Car No. 23 entered as Case-it Racing by Flying Lizard and car No. 45 entered as Flying Lizard Motorsports.); (United States) / Flying Lizard Motorsports	Audi R8 LMS GT4	23	(United States) Adam Merzon	All
(United States) / Case-it Racing by Flying Lizard; (United States) / Flying Lizard Motorsports	Audi R8 LMS GT4	45	(United States) Mike Hedlund	All
(United States) Racers Edge Motorsports	SIN R1 GT4	45	(United States) Bob Michaelian	*
(United States) Racers Edge Motorsports	SIN R1 GT4	54	(Canada) Mark Pavan	5
(United States) Racers Edge Motorsports	SIN R1 GT4	69	(United States) Harry Gottsacker	All *
(United States) Team Panoz Racing	Panoz Avezzano GT4	50	(United States) Ian James	All
(United States) Team Panoz Racing	Panoz Avezzano GT4	51	(United States) Preston Calvert	All
(United States) KohR Motorsports	Ford Mustang GT4	52	(United States) Nate Stacy	1
(United States) KPR	McLaren 570S GT4	62	(United States) Mark Klenin	All
(United States) TRG	Porsche Cayman GT4 Clubsport MR	66	(United States) Spencer Pumpelly	*
(United States) MarcoPolo Motorsports	KTM X-Bow GT4	71	(United States) Nicolai Elghanayan	7, 10
(United States) Robinson Racing	Mercedes-AMG GT4	72	(United States) Shane Lewis	1, 5
(United States) Robinson Racing	Chevrolet Camaro GT4.R	72	(United States) Shane Lewis	7, 10
(United States) Robinson Racing	Mercedes-AMG GT4	74	(United States) Gar Robinson	1, 5
(United States) Robinson Racing	Chevrolet Camaro GT4.R	74	(United States) Gar Robinson	7, 10
(United States) Volt Racing	Ford Mustang GT4	77	(United States) Alan Brynjolfsson	7
(Canada) Compass Racing	McLaren 570S GT4	78	(United States) Paul Holton	*
(United States) BimmerWorld	BMW M4 GT4	83	(United States) James Clay	7
(United States) Competition Motorsports	Porsche Cayman GT4 Clubsport MR	83	(United States) Mike Sullivan	*
(United States) Stephen Cameron Racing	BMW M4 GT4	88	(United States) Henry Schmitt	10
(United States) JCR Motorsports	Maserati GranTurismo MC GT4	89	(Canada) Fred Roberts	1, 5, 7
(United States) JCR Motorsports	Maserati GranTurismo MC GT4	99	(United States) Jeff Courtney	All
(Canada) Policaro Motorsport / SportsCarBoutique	Porsche Cayman GT4 Clubsport MR	138	(Canada) Andrew Danyliw	5

Colour	Class
	GTS
	GTSA

Notes

- – Drivers with an asterisk in the "Rounds" column took part in the non-championship round at Long Beach.

=== TCR/TCA ===
Team	Car	No.	Drivers	Rounds
(United States) Ives Motorsports	Mazda Global MX-5 Cup	07	(United States) Jose DaSilva	2, 6, 10
(Canada) The Racing Company	Audi RS 3 LMS	2	(Canada) Jérimy Daniel	2, 4, 6, 10
(United States) Copeland Motorsports	Mazda Global MX-5 Cup	4	(Puerto Rico) Bryan Ortiz	2, 4
(United States) Copeland Motorsports	Volkswagen Golf GTI TCR	18	(United States) Jarett Andretti	2, 4, 8–10
(United States) Copeland Motorsports	Volkswagen Golf GTI TCR	18	(Puerto Rico) Bryan Ortiz	6
(United States) M1 GT Racing	Audi RS 3 LMS	8	(Canada) David Ostella	6
(United States) Ian Lacy Racing	Mazda Global MX-5 Cup	10	(United States) Jenny Gannett	All
(United States) TFB	Volkswagen Golf GTI TCR	12	(United States) Mason Filippi	2, 4, 6, 8
(United States) / Atlanta Motorsports Group/Mauro Motorsports (Note: Car No. 13 entered as Atlanta Motorsports Group/Mauro Motorsports and car No. 54 entered as Jason Hoover Motorsports.); (United States) / Jason Hoover Motorsports	Mazda Global MX-5 Cup	13	(United States) John Mauro	2
(United States) / Atlanta Motorsports Group/Mauro Motorsports; (United States) / Jason Hoover Motorsports	Mazda Global MX-5 Cup	54	(United States) Austin Allison	2
(United States) TechSport Racing	Subaru BRZ tS	22	(United States) Breton Williams	All
(United States) TechSport Racing	Subaru BRZ tS	25	(Canada) P. J. Groenke	All
(United States) TechSport Racing	Subaru BRZ tS	79	(United States) Spencer Patterson	All
(United States) TechSport Racing	Subaru BRZ tS	89	(United States) Jeff Sexton	All
(United States) TechSport Racing	Subaru BRZ tS	95	(United States) Eric Powell	All
(United States) Murillo Racing	Mazda Global MX-5 Cup	24	(United States) Kenny Murillo	2, 4, 6
(United States) Murillo Racing	Mazda Global MX-5 Cup	55	(Russia) Moisey Uretsky	All
(United States) Murillo Racing	Audi RS 3 LMS	74	(United States) Matt Fassnacht	2, 4, 6, 8–9
(United States) Indian Summer Racing	Volkswagen Golf GTI	30	(United States) Travis Washay	2, 4, 6, 10
(United States) TWOth Autosport	Audi RS 3 LMS	37	(United States) Eddie Killeen	10
(United States) / RealTime Racing (Note: Cars No. 43 and 44 entered as RealTime Racing and car No. 94 entered as TOMO Racing.); (United States) / TOMO Racing	Honda Civic Type R TCR (FK8)	43	(United States) Ryan Eversley	All
(United States) / RealTime Racing; (United States) / TOMO Racing	Honda Civic Type R TCR (FK8)	44	(United States) Nick Esayian	2
(United States) / RealTime Racing; (United States) / TOMO Racing	Honda Civic Type R TCR (FK8)	44	(United States) Adam Merzon	4, 6
(United States) / RealTime Racing; (United States) / TOMO Racing	Honda Civic Type R TCR (FK8)	44	(United States) Michael Cooper	8
(United States) / RealTime Racing; (United States) / TOMO Racing	Honda Civic Type R TCR (FK8)	44	(United States) Mason Filippi	9–10
(United States) / RealTime Racing; (United States) / TOMO Racing	Honda Civic Si	94	(United States) Tom O'Gorman	All
(Canada) Team Octane	Mini Cooper JCW	45	(Canada) Nelson Chan	4, 10
(Canada) Team Octane	Mini Cooper JCW	46	(Canada) Michel Sallenbach	4
(Canada) Team Octane	Mini Cooper JCW	46	(Canada) Alain Lauziere	10
(United States) Jim Gorman Motorsports	Honda Civic Si	67	(United States) Skip Woody	4
(United States) / Heinlein Racing Development (Note: Cars No. 69 and 73 entered as Heinlein Racing Development and cars No. 71 and 72 entered as FCP Euro by HRD.); (United States) / FCP Euro by HRD	Audi RS 3 LMS	69	(United States) Anthony Geraci	All
(United States) / Heinlein Racing Development; (United States) / FCP Euro by HRD	Volkswagen Golf GTI TCR	71	(United States) Michael Hurczyn	All
(United States) / Heinlein Racing Development; (United States) / FCP Euro by HRD	Volkswagen Golf GTI TCR	72	(United States) Nate Vincent	All
(United States) / Heinlein Racing Development; (United States) / FCP Euro by HRD	Volkswagen Golf GTI TCR	73	(United States) Dwight Merriman	All
(United States) Alfatcr.USA	Alfa Romeo Giulietta TCR	70	(Denmark) Martin Jensen	2, 4
(Canada) Compass Racing	Audi RS 3 LMS	77	(United States) JT Coupal	All
(United States) Bryan Herta Autosport with Curb-Agajanian	Hyundai i30 N TCR	98	(United States) Michael Lewis	All
(United States) Bryan Herta Autosport with Curb-Agajanian	Hyundai i30 N TCR	99	(Canada) Mark Wilkins	All

Colour	Class
	TCR
	TCA

=== TC ===
Team	Car	No.	Drivers	Rounds
(United States) AutoTechnic Racing	BMW M235iR	02	(United States) Mark Brummond	2, 4, 10
(United States) AutoTechnic Racing	BMW M235iR	02	(United States) Anthony Serra	6
(United States) AutoTechnic Racing	BMW M235iR	20	(United States) Robert Nimkoff	2, 4, 6, 9–10
(United States) AutoTechnic Racing	BMW M235iR	21	(United States) John Allen	10
(United States) DRS	BMW M235iR	06	(United States) Bruce Wexler	10
(United States) DRS	BMW M235iR	09	(United States) Greg Nitzkowski	8–10
(United States) Rearden Racing	Nissan 370Z	3	(United States) Vesko Kozarov	All
(United States) Rearden Racing	Nissan 370Z	33	(United States) Paul Terry	All
(United States) Matt Young Motorsports	BMW M235iR	5	(United States) Max Fedler	2
(United States) Stephen Cameron Racing	BMW M235iR	19	(United States) Sean Quinlan	2, 4, 8–9
(United States) Stephen Cameron Racing	BMW M235iR	87	(United States) Henry Schmitt	2, 4, 8–10
(United States) TechSport Racing	Nissan 370Z	23	(United States) Steve Streimer	All
(United States) Classic BMW	BMW M235iR	26	(United States) Matt Travis	All
(United States) Classic BMW	BMW M235iR	27	(Canada) Jayson Clunie	All
(United States) Classic BMW	BMW M235iR	28	(United States) CJ Lett	4
(United States) Classic BMW	BMW M235iR	66	(United States) Daren Jorgensen	9
(United States) Classic BMW	BMW M235iR	91	(Canada) Karl Wittmer	All
(United States) RTF Racing	Honda Accord V6 Coupe	31	(United States) Jack Baruth	10
(United States) KRÜGSPEED	Lotus Exige	40	(United States) Dennis Hanratty Jr.	10
(United States) BERG	Mazda MX-5	50	(United States) Dinah Weisberg	10
(United States) BERG	Mazda MX-5	51	(United States) John Weisberg	6, 10
(United States) Steve Bottom Racing	Nissan 370Z	58	(United States) Steve Bottom	4, 6
(United States) RHC Lawrence-Strom	BMW M235iR	66	(United States) Daren Jorgensen	2
(United States) GenRacer	Hyundai Genesis Coupe	75	(United States) Jason Stanley	4, 10
(United States) GenRacer	Hyundai Genesis Coupe	78	(United States) Jeff Ricca	2, 4, 6, 10
(United States) Rooster Hall Racing	BMW M235iR	80	(United States) Johan Schwartz	All
(United States) Rooster Hall Racing	BMW M235iR	82	(United States) Richard Zulman	9
(United States) Winding Road Team TFB	BMW M235iR	81	(United States) Jacob Ruud	2, 6, 8
(United States) MarcoPolo Motorsports	Lotus Exige	92	(United States) Nicolai Elghanayan	6
(United States) Team HMA	Honda Civic Type R (FK8)	93	(United States) Joshua Foran	2, 4, 6, 10
(United States) Brass Monkey Racing	Nissan 370Z	97	(United States) Tony Rivera	2, 4

== Race results ==
Round		Circuit	GT Winners	GTA Winners	GT Cup Winners	GTS Winners	GTSA Winners	TCR Winners	TC Winners	TCA Winners
1	R1	(United States) St. Petersburg	(Canada) No. 96 Pfaff Motorsports	(Italy) No. 07 Squadra Corse; Garage Italia	No entries	(United States) No. 1 Blackdog Racing	(United States) No. 12 Ian Lacy Racing	did not participate		
1	R1	(United States) St. Petersburg	(Canada) Scott Hargrove	(Mexico) Martin Fuentes	No entries	(United States) Lawson Aschenbach	(United States) Drew Staveley	did not participate		
1	R2	(United States) St. Petersburg	(Canada) No. 96 Pfaff Motorsports	(Italy) No. 07 Squadra Corse; Garage Italia	No entries	(United States) No. 1 Blackdog Racing	(United States) No. 12 Ian Lacy Racing	did not participate		
1	R2	(United States) St. Petersburg	(Canada) Scott Hargrove	(Mexico) Martin Fuentes	No entries	(United States) Lawson Aschenbach	(United States) Drew Staveley	did not participate		
2	R1	(United States) Austin	did not participate					(United States) No. 98 Bryan Herta Autosport with Curb-Agajanian	(United States) No. 3 Rearden Racing	(United States) No. 95 TechSport Racing
2	R1	(United States) Austin	did not participate					(United States) Michael Lewis	(United States) Vesko Kozarov	(United States) Eric Powell
2	R2	(United States) Austin	did not participate					(United States) No. 99 Bryan Herta Autosport with Curb-Agajanian	(United States) No. 3 Rearden Racing	(United States) No. 94 TOMO Racing
2	R2	(United States) Austin	did not participate					(Canada) Mark Wilkins	(United States) Vesko Kozarov	(United States) Tom O'Gorman
3		(United States) Long Beach	(United States) No. 31 TR3 Racing	(United States) No. 55 Dream; Racing Motorsport	did not participate	(Canada) No. 78 Compass Racing	(United States) No. 45 Racers Edge Motorsports	did not participate		
3		(United States) Long Beach	(Italy) Daniel Mancinelli	(Japan) Yuki Harata	did not participate	(United States) Paul Holton	(United States) Bob Michaelian	did not participate		
4	R1	(United States) Virginia	did not participate					(United States) No. 43 RealTime Racing	(United States) No. 80 Rooster Hall Racing	(United States) No. 94 TOMO Racing
4	R1	(United States) Virginia	did not participate					(United States) Ryan Eversley	(United States) Johan Schwartz	(United States) Tom O'Gorman
4	R2	(United States) Virginia	did not participate					(United States) No. 99 Bryan Herta Autosport with Curb-Agajanian	(United States) No. 23 TechSport Racing	(United States) No. 95 TechSport Racing
4	R2	(United States) Virginia	did not participate					(Canada) Mark Wilkins	(United States) Steve Streimer	(United States) Eric Powell
5	R1	(Canada) Mosport	(United States) No. 2 CRP Racing	(United States) No. 19 TruSpeed Autosport	No entries	(United States) No. 1 Blackdog Racing	(United States) No. 62 KPR	did not participate		
5	R1	(Canada) Mosport	(Canada) Daniel Morad	(United States) Parker Chase	No entries	(United States) Lawson Aschenbach	(United States) Mark Klenin	did not participate		
5	R2	(Canada) Mosport	(United States) No. 9 K-PAX Racing	(Italy) No. 07 Squadra Corse; Garage Italia	No entries	(United States) No. 1 Blackdog Racing	(United States) No. 12 Ian Lacy Racing	did not participate		
5	R2	(Canada) Mosport	(Portugal) Álvaro Parente	(Mexico) Martin Fuentes	No entries	(United States) Lawson Aschenbach	(United States) Drew Staveley	did not participate		
6	R1	(United States) Lime Rock	did not participate					(United States) No. 43 RealTime Racing	(United States) No. 91 Classic BMW	(United States) No. 95 TechSport Racing
6	R1	(United States) Lime Rock	did not participate					(United States) Ryan Eversley	(Canada) Karl Wittmer	(United States) Eric Powell
6	R2	(United States) Lime Rock	did not participate					(United States) No. 98 Bryan Herta Autosport with Curb-Agajanian	(United States) No. 80 Rooster Hall Racing	(United States) No. 94 TOMO Racing
6	R2	(United States) Lime Rock	did not participate					(United States) Michael Lewis	(United States) Johan Schwartz	(United States) Tom O'Gorman
7	R1	(United States) Road America	(United States) No. 9 K-PAX Racing	(Italy) No. 07 Squadra Corse; Garage Italia	(United States) No. 27 Dream; Racing Motorsport	(United States) No. 50 Team Panoz Racing	(United States) No. 62 KPR	did not participate		
7	R1	(United States) Road America	(Portugal) Álvaro Parente	(Mexico) Martin Fuentes	(United States) Ryan Hardwick	(United States) Ian James	(United States) Mark Klenin	did not participate		
7	R2	(United States) Road America	(United States) No. 24 Alegra Motorsports	(United States) No. 19 TruSpeed AutoSport	(United States) No. 27 Dream; Racing Motorsport	(United States) No. 50 Team Panoz Racing	(United States) No. 99 JCR Motorsports	did not participate		
7	R2	(United States) Road America	(Denmark) Michael Christensen	(United States) Parker Chase	(United States) Ryan Hardwick	(United States) Ian James	(United States) Jeff Courtney	did not participate		
8	R1	(United States) Portland	did not participate					(United States) No. 99 Bryan Herta Autosport with Curb-Agajanian	(United States) No. 3 Rearden Racing	(United States) No. 89 TechSport Racing
8	R1	(United States) Portland	did not participate					(Canada) Mark Wilkins	(United States) Vesko Kozarov	(United States) Jeff Sexton
8	R2	(United States) Portland	did not participate					(United States) No. 43 RealTime Racing	(United States) No. 3 Rearden Racing	(United States) No. 89 TechSport Racing
8	R2	(United States) Portland	did not participate					(United States) Ryan Eversley	(United States) Vesko Kozarov	(United States) Jeff Sexton
9	R1	(United States) Utah	did not participate					(United States) No. 98 Bryan Herta Autosport with Curb-Agajanian	(United States) No. 3 Rearden Racing	(United States) No. 94 TOMO Racing
9	R1	(United States) Utah	did not participate					(United States) Michael Lewis	(United States) Vesko Kozarov	(United States) Tom O'Gorman
9	R2	(United States) Utah	did not participate					(United States) No. 98 Bryan Herta Autosport with Curb-Agajanian	(United States) No. 3 Rearden Racing	(United States) No. 94 TOMO Racing
9	R2	(United States) Utah	did not participate					(United States) Michael Lewis	(United States) Vesko Kozarov	(United States) Tom O'Gorman
10	R1	(United States) Watkins Glen	(United States) No. 3 K-PAX Racing	(United States) No. 91 Wright Motorsports	No entries	(United States) No. 55 PF Racing	(United States) No. 99 JCR Motorsports	(United States) No. 43 RealTime Racing	(United States) No. 91 Classic BMW	(United States) No. 94 TOMO Racing
10	R1	(United States) Watkins Glen	(Brazil) Rodrigo Baptista	(United States) Anthony Imperato	No entries	(United States) Jade Buford	(United States) Jeff Courtney	(United States) Ryan Eversley	(Canada) Karl Wittmer	(United States) Tom O'Gorman
10	R2	(United States) Watkins Glen	(United States) No. 3 K-PAX Racing	(United States) No. 91 Wright Motorsports	No entries	(United States) No. 50 Team Panoz Racing	(United States) No. 45 Flying Lizard Motorsports	(United States) No. 43 RealTime Racing	(United States) No. 80 Rooster Hall Racing	(United States) No. 30 Indian Summer Racing
10	R2	(United States) Watkins Glen	(Brazil) Rodrigo Baptista	(United States) Anthony Imperato	No entries	(United States) Ian James	(United States) Mike Hedlund	(United States) Ryan Eversley	(United States) Johan Schwartz	(United States) Travis Washay

== Championship standings ==
=== Drivers' championships ===
Championship points were awarded for the first twenty positions in each race. The pole-sitter also received one point with the exception of the GTA and GTSA classes. Entries were required to complete 50% of the winning car's race distance in order to be classified and earn points.

Position	**1st**	**2nd**	**3rd**	**4th**	**5th**	**6th**	**7th**	**8th**	**9th**	**10th**	**11th**	**12th**	**13th**	**14th**	**15th**	**16th**	**17th**	**18th**	**19th**	**20th**	**Pole**
Points	25	23	21	19	17	15	14	13	12	11	10	9	8	7	6	5	4	3	2	1	1

==== GT ====
Pos.	Driver	Team	STP		AUS		LBH	VIR		MOS		LIM		ELK		POR		UTA		WGL		Overall	Sprint
Pos.	Driver	Team	RD1	RD2	RD1	RD2	RDU	RD1	RD2	RD1	RD2	RD1	RD2	RD1	RD2	RD1	RD2	RD1	RD2	RD1	RD2	Overall	Sprint
1	(Finland) Toni Vilander	(Canada) R. Ferri Motorsport	**2**	11	1	1	**2**	2	8	5	3	2	1	2	5	1	**7**	1	1	4	4	398	174
2	(Canada) Scott Hargrove	(Canada) Pfaff Motorsports	1	**1**	4	3	4	3	2	4	6	3	4	3	4	3	6	4	13	6	2	369	182
3	(Denmark) Michael Christensen	(United States) Alegra Motorsports	5	4	7	8	11	5	3	2	4	1	3	5	1	**2**	4	2	3	3	6	364	166
4	(Brazil) Rodrigo Baptista	(United States) K-PAX Racing	7	6	5	6	10	1	**5**	10	2	8	5	7	6	12	2	7	4	**1**	**1**	325	155
5	(Portugal) Álvaro Parente	(United States) K-PAX Racing	Ret	8	6	7	3	Ret	DNS	6	**1**	4	2	1	**2**	Ret	DNS	**Ret**	**6**	10	3	246	156
6	(Canada) Daniel Morad	(United States) CRP Racing	3	3	2	5	20	**8**	4	**1**	5	6	**12**	6	12	7	12					237	116
7	(United States) Parker Chase	(United States) TruSpeed AutoSport	Ret	7	13	9	7	6	10	7	9	5	7	9	7	3	1	6	7			232	80
8	(Spain) Miguel Molina	(Canada) R. Ferri Motorsport			1	1		2	8			2	1			1	**7**	1	1			224	–
9	(United States) Spencer Pumpelly	(United States) TRG	Ret	10			16^{1}															209	11
9	(United States) Spencer Pumpelly	(United States) Alegra Motorsports			7	8		5	3			1	3			**2**	4	2	3			209	11
10	(Mexico) Martin Fuentes	(Italy) Squadra Corse Garage Italia	6	5	10	13	6	11	12	8	8	12	11	8	8	8	6	10	9			207	99
11	(Japan) Yuki Harata	(United States) Dream Racing Motorsport	8	9	8	11	5	7	7	9	10	11	10	11	9	5	11	8	Ret			199	87
12	(Germany) Wolf Henzler	(Canada) Pfaff Motorsports			4	3		3	2			6	3			3	6	4	13			187	–
13	(Belgium) Maxime Soulet	(United States) K-PAX Racing			5	6		1	**5**			8	5			12	2	7	4			170	–
14	(United Kingdom) Ryan Dalziel	(United States) TruSpeed AutoSport			13	9		6	10			5	7			3	1	6	7			152	–
15	(United States) Scott Heckert (United States) Mike Skeen	(United States) Lone Star Racing			**3**	2		13	1			**9**	6					3	2			150	–
16	(Canada) Wei Lu (United States) Jeff Segal	(United States) TR3 Racing			11	**4**		10	9			7	8			4	5	5	6			148	–
17	(Italy) Daniel Mancinelli	(United States) TR3 Racing	WD	WD			1			3	7			**4**	3					2	Ret	124	124
18	(United States) David Askew	(United States) DXDT Racing			12	14		14	14					12	10	11	8	9	12	9	7	113	46
19	(Italy) Alessandro Bressan	(United States) Dream Racing Motorsport			8	11		7	7			11	10			5	11	8	Ret			112	–
20	(United States) Caesar Bacarella	(Italy) Squadra Corse Garage Italia			10	13		11	12			12	11			8	6	10	9			108	–
21	(Spain) Andy Soucek	(United States) K-PAX Racing			6	7		Ret	DNS			4	2			Ret	DNS	**Ret**	**6**			90	–
22	(United States) Tim Pappas	(United States) Black Swan Racing			9	12	9	9	11			10	9									78	12
23	(Germany) Fabian Schiller	(United States) CRP Racing			2	5		**8**	4													73	–
24	(Netherlands) Jeroen Bleekemolen	(United States) Black Swan Racing			9	12		9	11			10	9									66	–
25	(United States) Alec Udell	(United States) GMG Racing			Ret	10	13	4	6													53	8
26	(Germany) Daniel Keilwitz	(United States) Callaway Competition USA	4	2	DNS	19																48	42
27	(United States) Anthony Imperato	(United States) Wright Motorsports												10	Ret					7	5	42	42
28	(United States) Matthew Brabham	(United States) CRP Racing														7	12	Ret	8			36	-
29	(United States) Corey Lewis	(United States) GMG Racing						4	6													34	–
30	(United States) Michael Cooper	(United States) CRP Racing																Ret	8	5	Ret	30	17
31	(Germany) Mario Farnbacher	(United States) HART																		8	8	26	26
32	(Italy) Raffaele Marciello	(United States) CRP Racing										6	**12**									25	-
33	(United States) Guy Cosmo (United States) Patrick Byrne	(United States) Precision Performance Motorsports														9	10					23	–
34	(United States) Rich Baek (United States) Trevor Baek	(United States) Vital Speed Motorsports														10	9					23	–
35	(Japan) Naoto Takeda (Japan) Takuya Shirasaka	(United States) Turner Motorsport																11	10			21	–
36	(United States) Pierre Mulacek (United States) Anthony Lazzaro	(United States) Risi Competizione																12	11			19	–
37	(United States) Andy Wilzoch	(United States) Flying Lizard Motorsports												13	11							18	18
38	(United States) Lawrence DeGeorge	(United States) DXDT Racing			WD	WD		12	16													15	–
39	(Monaco) Cédric Sbirrazzuoli	(United States) DXDT Racing						12	16													15	–
40	(Australia) David Calvert-Jones	(United States) Black Swan Racing					8															13	13
41	(France) Mathieu Jaminet	(United States) GMG Racing			Ret	10																11	–
42	(United States) Rocky Moran Jr.	(United States) TruSpeed AutoSport					12															9	9
43	(United States) Dore Chaponick Jr. (United States) Brett Sandberg	(United States) TruSpeed AutoSport						Ret	13													8	–
44	(United States) Eric Curran	(United States) Callaway Competition USA			DNS	19																6	–
GT4 class entered drivers at the non-championship round at Long Beach
	(United States) Paul Holton	(Canada) Compass Racing					**14**																
	(United States) Harry Gottsacker	(United States) Racers Edge Motorsports					15																
GT4A class entered drivers at the non-championship round at Long Beach
	(United States) Bob Michaelian	(United States) Racers Edge Motorsports					**17**																
	(United States) Jeff Ward	(United States) Black Swan Racing					18																
	(United States) George Kurtz	(United States) GMG Racing					19																
	(United States) Mike Sullivan	(United States) Competition Motorsports					Ret																
Pos.	Driver	Team	STP		AUS		LBH	VIR		MOS		LIM		ELK		POR		UTA		WGL		Overall	Sprint

Key
Colour	Result
Gold	Race winner
Silver	2nd place
Bronze	3rd place
Green	Points finish
Blue	Non-points finish
Blue	Non-classified finish (NC)
Purple	Did not finish (Ret)
Black	Disqualified (DSQ)
Black	Excluded (EX)
White	Did not start (DNS)
White	Race cancelled (C)
White	Withdrew (WD)
Blank	Did not participate

SprintX races

**Bold** – Pole position
Italics – Fastest Lap

Notes

- ^{1} – Ineligible to score points

==== GTA ====
Pos.	Driver	Team	STP		LBH	MOS		ELK		WGL		Points
Pos.	Driver	Team	RD1	RD2	RDU	RD1	RD2	RD1	RD2	RD1	RD2	Points
1	(Mexico) Martin Fuentes	(Italy) Squadra Corse Garage Italia	6	**5**	6	8	**8**					121
2	(Japan) Yuki Harata	(United States) Dream Racing Motorsport	8	9	**5**	9	10					111
3	(United States) Parker Chase	(United States) TruSpeed AutoSport	**Ret**	7	7	**7**	9					92
4	(Australia) David Calvert-Jones	(United States) Black Swan Racing			8							19
5	(United States) Tim Pappas	(United States) Black Swan Racing			9							17
Pos.	Driver	Team	STP		LBH	MOS		ELK		WGL		Points

==== GTS ====
Pos.	Driver	Team	STP		AUS		VIR		MOS		LIM		ELK		POR		UTA		WGL		Overall	Sprint
Pos.	Driver	Team	RD1	RD2	RD1	RD2	RD1	RD2	RD1	RD2	RD1	RD2	RD1	RD2	RD1	RD2	RD1	RD2	RD1	RD2	Overall	Sprint
1	(United States) James Sofronas	(United States) GMG Racing	5	3	4	1	2	**1**	4	4											169	76
2	(United States) Lawson Aschenbach	(United States) Blackdog Racing	1	**1**	7	33	3	3	1	**1**											158	102
3	(United States) Jade Buford	(United States) PF Racing	Ret	5	1	8	6	11	2	3											124	61
4	(United States) Shane Lewis	(United States) Robinson Racing	6	10	19	9	**9**	18	3	5											94	64
5	(United States) Alex Welch	(United States) GMG Racing			4	1	2	**1**													93	–
6	(United States) Harry Gottsacker	(United States) Racers Edge Motorsports	17	6	**2**	4	Ret	30	9	6											89	47
7	(United States) Drew Staveley	(United States) Ian Lacy Racing	3	8	5	7	16	33	16	7											89	53
8	(United States) Tony Gaples	(United States) Blackdog Racing	11	11	3	18	15	5	10	11											88	41
9	(United States) Gar Robinson	(United States) Robinson Racing	18	13	19	9	**9**	18	6	2											79	39
10	(United States) Mike Hedlund	(United States) Flying Lizard Motorsports	8	12	Ret	10	12	10	11	13											71	40
11	(Canada) Scott Maxwell	(United States) PF Racing			1	8	6	11													63	–
12	(Switzerland) Gabriele Piana	(Belgium) Mühlner Motorsports America	**2**	2			36	7													61	47
13	(United States) Ian James	(United States) Team Panoz Racing	25	4	Ret	35	5	14	**5**	EX											61	37
14	(United States) Andy Pilgrim	(United States) Blackdog Racing			7	33	3	3													56	–
15	(United States) Toby Grahovec	(United States) Classic BMW	12	9	15	24	4	13													54	21
16	(United States) Jeff Courtney	(United States) JCR Motorsports	10	16	WD	WD	11	16	12	8											53	38
17	(United States) George Kurtz	(United States) GMG Racing	24	Ret	10	20	10	4	20	12											52	10
18	(United States) Alan Brynjolfsson (United States) Trent Hindman	(United States) Volt Racing					1	2													48	–
20	(Canada) Orey Fidani	(Canada) Pfaff Motorsports	15	15	18	31	14	6	14	17											48	23
21	(United States) Michael Cooper	(United States) Blackdog Racing			3	18	15	5													47	–
22	(United States) Aurora Straus	(Canada) ST Racing			11	6	13	8													46	–
23	(Canada) Samantha Tan (Canada) Nick Wittmer	(Canada) ST Racing			6	**3**	17	17													45	–
25	(United States) Colin Braun	(United States) GMG Racing			10	20	10	4													42	–
26	(United States) Nate Stacy	(United States) KohR Motorsports	9	7	9	19															40	26
27	(United States) Justin Raphael	(United States) Classic BMW	14	19	24	2	20	15													39	9
28	(United States) Chris Ohmacht	(United States) Classic BMW	21	20	15	24	4	13													34	1
29	(United States) Preston Calvert	(United States) Team Panoz Racing	13	18	20	25	18	DSQ	13	10											34	30
30	(United States) Greg Liefooghe (United States) Henry Schmitt	(United States) Stephen Cameron Racing			12	Ret	7	12													32	–
32	(United Kingdom) Stevan McAleer	(United States) Classic BMW			24	2	20	15													30	–
33	(United States) Jason Bell	(United States) M1 GT Racing	4	14	22	27	35	23	23	21											26	26
34	(United States) Paul Holton (United States) Ray Mason	(Canada) Compass Racing			13	5	Ret	DNS													25	–
36	(United States) Al Carter	(Canada) ST Racing			11	6															25	–
37	(Canada) Kyle Marcelli	(Canada) Pfaff Motorsports			18	31	14	6													25	–
38	(Canada) Fred Roberts	(United States) JCR Motorsports	DNS	21			24	DNS	8	9											25	25
39	(United States) Matt Keegan	(United States) Team Panoz Racing			Ret	35	5	14													24	–
40	(United States) Vinnie Allegretta	(United States) PF Racing	7	24	25	21	27	27	17	15											24	24
41	(United States) Jon Miller	(Canada) ST Racing					13	8													21	–
42	(United States) Matt Fassnacht (United States) Christian Szymczak	(United States) Murillo Racing			33	14	19	9													21	–
44	(United States) Adam Merzon	(United States) Case-it Racing by Flying Lizard	19	23	17	11	22	22	19	20											19	5
45	(United States) Mark Klenin	(United States) KPR	20	26	21	23	21	20	7	22											16	15
46	(United States) Daren Jorgensen (United States) Cameron Lawrence	(United States) RHC Lawrence-Strom			14	12															16	–
48	(United States) James Pesek	(United States) PF Racing	23	17	16	17	23	29	22	18											16	7
49	(United States) Michael Camus (United States) Randy Mueller	(United States) Epic Motorsports			Ret	32	8	19													15	–
51	(Germany) Moritz Kranz	(United States) Mühlner Motorsports America					36	7													14	–
52	(United States) Dean Martin	(United States) KohR Motorsports			9	19															14	–
53	(United States) Ryan Eversley	(United States) Case-it Racing by Flying Lizard			17	11	22	22													14	–
54	(United States) Jason Hart (United States) Mike Vess	(United States) Classic BMW			8	30	25	24													13	–
56	(Canada) Mark Pavan	(United States) Racers Edge Motorsports			29	34	30	25	15	14											13	13
57	(Serbia) Marko Radisic	(United States) Precision Driving	16	Ret	31	16	29	32													10	5
58	(United States) Shelby Blackstock	(United States) PF Racing			16	17	23	29													9	–
59	(United States) Andy Lee (United States) Elias Sabo	(United States) GMG Racing			Ret	13	33	31													8	–
61	(Canada) Andrew Danyliw	(Canada) Policaro Motorsport / SportsCarBoutique							18	16											8	8
62	(United States) Derek DeBoer (United States) Sean Gibbons	(United States) TRG			23	15	28	Ret													6	–
64	(United States) David Roberts	(United States) Precision Driving			31	16	29	32													5	–
65	(United States) Frank Gannett	(United States) Ian Lacy Racing	Ret	22	27	Ret	32	28	21	19											2	2
66	(United States) Kris Wilson	(United States) KPR					21	20													1	–
67	(Canada) Max Riddle	(United States) KPR			21	23															0	–
68	(United States) JR Pesek	(United States) PF Racing			25	21	27	27													0	–
69	(United States) Jeff Burton	(United States) Rearden Racing			30	28	26	21													0	–
70	(United States) Steve Burns	(United States) Ian Lacy Racing	22	25	32	29	31	DNS													0	0
71	(United States) Nicolai Elghanayan	(United States) MarcoPolo Motorsports			28	22															0	–
72	(United States) Vesko Kozarov (United States) Ace Robey	(United States) Rearden Racing			26	26															0	–
74	(Puerto Rico) Keith Jensen	(United States) NOLAsport					34	26													0	–
Pos.	Driver	Team	STP		AUS		VIR		MOS		LIM		ELK		POR		UTA		WGL		Overall	Sprint

==== GTSA ====
Pos.	Driver	Team	STP		MOS		ELK		WGL		Points
Pos.	Driver	Team	RD1	RD2	RD1	RD2	RD1	RD2	RD1	RD2	Points
1	(United States) Drew Staveley	(United States) Ian Lacy Racing	3	**8**	16	7					87
2	(United States) Tony Gaples	(United States) Blackdog Racing	11	11	10	11					76
3	(United States) Jeff Courtney	(United States) JCR Motorsports	10	16	12	8					73
4	(United States) Mike Hedlund	(United States) Flying Lizard Motorsports	8	12	**11**	13					73
5	(United States) Preston Calvert	(United States) Team Panoz Racing	13	18	13	10					60
6	(Canada) Fred Roberts	(United States) JCR Motorsports	DNS	21	8	**9**					53
7	(United States) Jason Bell	(United States) M1 GT Racing	4	14	23	21					53
8	(Canada) Orey Fidani	(Canada) Pfaff Motorsports	15	15	14	17					52
9	(United States) Mark Klenin	(United States) KPR	20	26	7	22					45
10	(United States) Toby Grahovec	(United States) Classic BMW	12	9							38
11	(United States) James Pesek	(United States) PF Racing	23	17	22	18					36
12	(United States) Adam Merzon	(United States) Case-it Racing by Flying Lizard	19	23	19	20					35
13	(United States) George Kurtz	(United States) GMG Racing	24	Ret	20	12					29
14	(Canada) Mark Pavan	(United States) Racers Edge Motorsports			15	14					26
15	(United States) Frank Gannett	(United States) Ian Lacy Racing	Ret	22	21	19					25
16	(United States) Justin Raphael	(United States) Classic BMW	14	19							24
17	(Canada) Andrew Danyliw	(Canada) Policaro Motorsport / SportsCarBoutique			18	16					23
18	(United States) Chris Ohmacht	(United States) Classic BMW	21	20							18
19	(United States) Steve Burns	(United States) Ian Lacy Racing	22	25							13
20	(Serbia) Marko Radisic	(United States) Precision Driving	16	Ret							11
Pos.	Driver	Team	STP		MOS		ELK		WGL		Points

==== TCR/TCA ====
Pos.	Driver	Team	AUS		VIR		LIM		POR		UTA		WGL		Points
Pos.	Driver	Team	RD1	RD2	RD1	RD2	RD1	RD2	RD1	RD2	RD1	RD2	RD1	RD2	Points
TCR
1	(United States) Ryan Eversley	(United States) RealTime Racing	3	3	**1**	2									91
2	(Canada) Mark Wilkins	(United States) Bryan Herta Autosport with Curb-Agajanian	**2**	**1**	24	1									83
3	(United States) Michael Lewis	(United States) Bryan Herta Autosport with Curb-Agajanian	1	2	2	**Ret**									72
4	(Canada) Jérimy Daniel	(Canada) The Racing Company	7	6	3	3									71
5	(United States) Anthony Geraci	(United States) Heinlein Racing Development	5	4	5	5									70
6	(United States) JT Coupal	(Canada) Compass Racing	13	9	6	4									54
7	(United States) Mason Filippi	(United States) TFB	9	7	4	26									53
8	(United States) Nate Vincent	(United States) FCP Euro by HRD	8	5	8	12									52
9	(Denmark) Martin Jensen	(United States) Alfatcr.USA	4	Ret	7	6									48
10	(United States) Dwight Merriman	(United States) Heinlein Racing Development	11	10	10	10									43
11	(United States) Michael Hurczyn	(United States) FCP Euro by HRD	6	8	Ret	7									42
12	(United States) Matt Fassnacht	(United States) Murillo Racing	10	Ret	9	8									36
13	(United States) Jarett Andretti	(United States) Copeland Motorsports	Ret	23	11	9			Ret	7	6	7	Ret	8	106
14	(United States) Nick Esayian	(United States) RealTime Racing	12	11											19
15	(United States) Adam Merzon	(United States) RealTime Racing			12	11									19
TCA
1	(United States) Eric Powell	(United States) TechSport Racing	14	**13**	14	13									97
2	(United States) Tom O'Gorman	(United States) TOMO Racing	15	12	**13**	15									95
3	(Puerto Rico) Bryan Ortiz	(United States) Copeland Motorsports	**17**	18	15	16									74
4	(United States) Spencer Patterson	(United States) TechSport Racing	19	17	16	17									66
5	(Canada) P. J. Groenke	(United States) TechSport Racing	16	14	20	27									62
6	(United States) Kenny Murillo	(United States) Murillo Racing	18	15	25	**18**		DNS							61
7	(United States) Travis Washay	(United States) Indian Summer Racing	25	Ret	17	14									49
8	(Russia) Moisey Uretsky	(United States) Murillo Racing	24	21	21	20									46
9	(United States) Breton Williams	(United States) TechSport Racing	20	Ret	23	23									34
10	(United States) Jeff Sexton	(United States) TechSport Racing	27	16	Ret	24									33
11	(Canada) Michel Sallenbach	(Canada) Team Octane			18	19									29
12	(Canada) Nelson Chan	(Canada) Team Octane			19	21									26
13	(United States) John Mauro	(United States) Atlanta Motorsports Group/Mauro Motorsports	21	19											26
14	(United States) Austin Allison	(United States) Jason Hoover Motorsports	23	20											23
15	(United States) Jose DaSilva	(United States) Ives Motorsports	22	22											22
16	(United States) Skip Woody	(United States) Jim Gorman Motorsports			22	22									22
17	(United States) Jenny Gannett	(United States) Ian Lacy Racing	26	Ret	Ret	25									16
Pos.	Driver	Team	AUS		VIR		LIM		POR		UTA		WGL		Points

==== TC ====
Pos.	Driver	Team	AUS		VIR		LIM		POR		UTA		WGL		Points
Pos.	Driver	Team	RD1	RD2	RD1	RD2	RD1	RD2	RD1	RD2	RD1	RD2	RD1	RD2	Points
1	(United States) Vesko Kozarov	(United States) Rearden Racing	**1**	**1**	4	5									88
2	(Canada) Karl Wittmer	(United States) Classic BMW	3	5	3	3									80
3	(United States) Steve Streimer	(United States) TechSport Racing	7	8	2	1									75
4	(United States) Johan Schwartz	(United States) Rooster Hall Racing	4	3	**1**	14									73
5	(United States) Matt Travis	(United States) Classic BMW	6	4	5	4									70
6	(United States) Jeff Ricca	(United States) GenRacer	9	7	9	2									61
7	(United States) Robert Nimkoff	(United States) AutoTechnic Racing	8	6	6	6									58
8	(United States) Sean Quinlan	(United States) Stephen Cameron Racing	12	10	13	7									42
9	(United States) Tony Rivera	(United States) Brass Monkey Racing	5	2	WD	WD									40
10	(United States) Henry Schmitt	(United States) Stephen Cameron Racing	15	13	8	9									39
11	(United States) Mark Brummond	(United States) AutoTechnic Racing	17	11	12	**10**									35
12	(United States) Joshua Foran	(United States) Team HMA	14	15	10	13	WD	WD							32
13	(United States) Paul Terry	(United States) Rearden Racing	2	Ret	14	DNS									30
14	(United States) Jason Stanley	(United States) GenRacer			7	8									30
15	(Canada) Jayson Clunie	(United States) Classic BMW	10	9	WD	WD									23
16	(United States) CJ Lett	(United States) Classic BMW			11	11									20
17	(United States) Max Fedler	(United States) Matt Young Motorsports	13	12											17
18	(United States) Daren Jorgensen	(United States) RHC Lawrence-Strom	16	14											12
19	(United States) Jacob Ruud	(United States) Winding Road Team TFB	11	Ret											10
20	(United States) Steve Bottom	(United States) Steve Bottom Racing			DNS	12		DNS							9
Pos.	Driver	Team	AUS		VIR		LIM		POR		UTA		WGL		Points

=== Manufacturers' championships ===
Only those manufacturers who are SCCA Pro Racing corporate members were eligible to receive points toward the Manufacturers' championship. Points were awarded based on finishing positions as shown in the chart below. Only the highest finishing car of each eligible manufacturer earned points for its finishing position.

Position	**1st**	**2nd**	**3rd**	**4th**	**5th**	**6th**	**7th**	**8th**	**9th**	**Pole**
Points	10	8	7	6	5	4	3	2	1	1

==== GT ====
Pos.	Manufacturer	Car	STP		AUS		LBH	VIR		MOS		LIM		ELK		POR		UTA		WGL		Points
Pos.	Manufacturer	Car	RD1	RD2	RD1	RD2	RDU	RD1	RD2	RD1	RD2	RD1	RD2	RD1	RD2	RD1	RD2	RD1	RD2	RD1	RD2	Points
1	(Italy) Ferrari	488 GT3	**2**	5	1	**1**	**1**	2	8	3	3											70
2	(Germany) Porsche	911 GT3 R	1	**1**	4	3	4	3	2	2	4											69
3	(Germany) Mercedes-AMG	GT3	3	3	**2**	2	20	**8**	1	**1**	5											60
4	(United Kingdom) Bentley	Continental GT3	7	6	5	6	3	1	**5**	6	**1**											54
5	(Italy) Lamborghini	Huracán GT3	8	9	8	11	5	7	7	9	10											17
6	(Germany) Audi	R8 LMS	Ret	7	13	9	7	6	10	7	9											15
7	(United States) Chevrolet	Corvette C7 GT3-R	4	2	DNS	19																14
Manufacturers ineligible to score GT class points
	(United Kingdom) Aston Martin	V12 Vantage GT3	Ret	10																		
Pos.	Manufacturer	Car	STP		AUS		LBH	VIR		MOS		LIM		ELK		POR		UTA		WGL		Points

==== GTS ====
Pos.	Manufacturer	Car	STP		AUS		VIR		MOS		LIM		ELK		POR		UTA		WGL		Points
Pos.	Manufacturer	Car	RD1	RD2	RD1	RD2	RD1	RD2	RD1	RD2	RD1	RD2	RD1	RD2	RD1	RD2	RD1	RD2	RD1	RD2	Points
1	(United States) Chevrolet	Camaro GT4.R	1	**1**	3	18	3	3	1	**1**											63
2	(Germany) Audi	R8 LMS GT4	4	3	4	1	2	**1**	4	4											60
3	(United States) Ford	Mustang GT4	7	5	1	8	1	2	2	3											53
4	(Germany) Mercedes-AMG	GT4	6	10	19	9	**9**	9	3	2											23
5	(Germany) BMW	M4 GT4	12	9	6	**2**	4	8													22
6	(Germany) Porsche	Cayman GT4 Clubsport MR	**2**	2	18	15	14	6	14	16											21
7	(United Kingdom) Ginetta	G55 GT4	3	8	5	7	16	28	16	7											20
8	(United States) Panoz	Avezzano GT4	13	4	20	25	5	14	**5**	10											17
Manufacturers ineligible to score GTS class points
	(Bulgaria) SIN	R1 GT4	17	16	**2**	4	30	25	9	6											
	(United Kingdom) McLaren	570S GT4	20	26	13	5	21	20	7	22											
	(Italy) Maserati	GranTurismo MC GT4	10	16	WD	WD	11	16	8	8											
	(Austria) KTM	X-Bow GT4			28	22															
Pos.	Manufacturer	Car	STP		AUS		VIR		MOS		LIM		ELK		POR		UTA		WGL		Points

==== TCR/TCA ====
Pos.	Manufacturer	Car	AUS		VIR		LIM		POR		UTA		WGL		Points
Pos.	Manufacturer	Car	RD1	RD2	RD1	RD2	RD1	RD2	RD1	RD2	RD1	RD2	RD1	RD2	Points
TCR
1	(South Korea) Hyundai	i30 N TCR	**1**	**1**	2	**1**									41
2	(Japan) Honda	Civic Type R TCR (FK8)	3	3	**1**	2									33
3	(Germany) Audi	RS 3 LMS	5	4	3	3									25
4	(Germany) Volkswagen	Golf GTI TCR	6	5	4	7									18
Manufacturers ineligible to score TCR class points
	(Italy) Alfa Romeo	Giulietta TCR	4	Ret	7	6									
TCA
1	(Japan) Honda	Civic Si	15	12	**13**	15									36
2	(Japan) Mazda	Global MX-5 Cup	**17**	15	15	**16**									27
Manufacturers ineligible to score TCA class points
	(Japan) Subaru	BRZ tS	14	**13**	14	13									
	(Germany) Volkswagen	Golf GTI	25	Ret	17	14									
	(United Kingdom) Mini	Cooper JCW			18	19									
Pos.	Manufacturer	Car	AUS		VIR		LIM		POR		UTA		WGL		Points

==== TC ====
Pos.	Manufacturer	Car	AUS		VIR		LIM		POR		UTA		WGL		Points
Pos.	Manufacturer	Car	RD1	RD2	RD1	RD2	RD1	RD2	RD1	RD2	RD1	RD2	RD1	RD2	Points
1	(Japan) Nissan	370Z	**1**	**1**	2	1									40
2	(Germany) BMW	M235iR	3	3	**1**	**2**									33
Manufacturers ineligible to score TC class points
	(South Korea) Hyundai	Genesis Coupe	9	7	7	2									
	(Japan) Honda	Civic Type R (FK8)	14	15	10	13									
Pos.	Manufacturer	Car	AUS		VIR		LIM		POR		UTA		WGL		Points
