= 2018 Continental Tire SportsCar Challenge =

Motor racing competition

The 2018 Continental Tire SportsCar Championship is the nineteenth season of the Continental Tire SportsCar Challenge and the fifth season organized by the International Motor Sports Association (IMSA).

== Classes ==
The class structure adds the TCR category alongside the GS and ST cars. Eligible manufacturers include Alfa Romeo, Audi, Ford, Honda, Hyundai, Kia, SEAT, Subaru, and Volkswagen. Also, the GS category will only allow cars homologated to Group GT4 regulations.

- Grand Sport (GS)
- Touring Car (TCR)
- Street Tuner (ST)

== Schedule ==
The schedule remains unchanged, aside from the Circuit of the Americas being switched for Mid-Ohio Sports Car Course. Additionally, Watkins Glen International becomes a four-hour endurance race along with races at Daytona International Speedway and Laguna Seca. All other races are approximately two hours in length.

Rnd	Race	Circuit	Location	Date	Duration
1	BMW Endurance Challenge at Daytona	Daytona International Speedway	Daytona Beach, Florida	January 26	4 Hours
2	Alan Jay Automotive Network 120	Sebring International Raceway	Sebring, Florida	March 16	2 Hours
3	Mid-Ohio 120	Mid-Ohio Sports Car Course	Lexington, Ohio	May 5	2 Hours
4	Continental 240 at The Glen	Watkins Glen International	Watkins Glen, New York	June 30	4 Hours
5	Canadian Tire Motorsport Park 120	Canadian Tire Motorsport Park	Bowmanville, Ontario	July 7	2 Hours
6	Lime Rock Park 120	Lime Rock Park	Lakeville, Connecticut	July 21	2 Hours
7	Road America 120	Road America	Elkhart Lake, Wisconsin	August 4	2 Hours
8	Biscuitville Grand Prix	Virginia International Raceway	Alton, Virginia	August 18	2 Hours
9	WeatherTech Raceway Laguna Seca 120	WeatherTech Raceway Laguna Seca	Monterey, California	September 8	2 Hours
10	Fox Factory 120	Road Atlanta	Braselton, Georgia	October 12	2 Hours
NC	Michelin Encore ^{1}	Sebring International Raceway	Sebring, Florida	November 9	4 Hours

^{1} Grand Sport and TCR will participate in this race with the WeatherTech Championship's GT Daytona class and LMP3 cars in IMSA Prototype Challenge as one single four-hour race. This race will preview the 2019 IMSA rules package and new tyre supplier Michelin.

== Entry list ==
=== Grand Sport ===
Team	Car	No.	Drivers	Rounds
(United States) Automatic Racing	Aston Martin V8 Vantage GT4	09	(United States) Ramin Abdolvahabi	1–2
(United States) Automatic Racing	Aston Martin V8 Vantage GT4	09	(United States) Rob Ecklin Jr.	1, 3–4, 7, 9
(United States) Automatic Racing	Aston Martin V8 Vantage GT4	09	(United States) Brandon Kidd	1, 3–4, 9
(United States) Automatic Racing	Aston Martin V8 Vantage GT4	09	(United States) Conor Flynn	2
(United States) Automatic Racing	Aston Martin V8 Vantage GT4	09	(United States) Peter Ludwig	7
(United States) Automatic Racing	Aston Martin V8 Vantage GT4	9	(United States) Ramin Abdolvahabi	4
(United States) Automatic Racing	Aston Martin V8 Vantage GT4	9	(United States) Nick Longhi	4
(United States) Automatic Racing	Aston Martin V8 Vantage GT4	9	(United States) Aurora Straus	4
(United States) Automatic Racing	Aston Martin V8 Vantage GT4	9	(United States) Craig Lyons	7
(United States) Automatic Racing	Aston Martin V8 Vantage GT4	9	(United States) Kris Wilson	7
(United States) Automatic Racing	Aston Martin V8 Vantage GT4	99	(United States) Al Carter	1–4
(United States) Automatic Racing	Aston Martin V8 Vantage GT4	99	(United States) Steven Phillips	1–3
(United States) Automatic Racing	Aston Martin V8 Vantage GT4	99	(United States) Aurora Straus	1
(United States) Automatic Racing	Aston Martin V8 Vantage GT4	99	(United States) Eric Lux	4
(United States) Automatic Racing	Aston Martin V8 Vantage GT4	99	(United States) Rob Ecklin, Jr.	6
(United States) Automatic Racing	Aston Martin V8 Vantage GT4	99	(United States) Kris Wilson	6, 9–10
(United States) Automatic Racing	Aston Martin V8 Vantage GT4	99	(United States) Ramin Abdolvahabi	7
(United States) Automatic Racing	Aston Martin V8 Vantage GT4	99	(United States) John Allen	7
(United States) Automatic Racing	Aston Martin V8 Vantage GT4	99	(United States) Gary Ferrera	9–10
(Germany) Winward Racing/HTP Motorsport	Mercedes-AMG GT4	3	(United States) Craig Lyons	1–2
(Germany) Winward Racing/HTP Motorsport	Mercedes-AMG GT4	3	(United States) Kris Wilson	1–2
(Germany) Winward Racing/HTP Motorsport	Mercedes-AMG GT4	33	(Republic of Ireland) Damien Faulkner	1–7, 9–10
(Germany) Winward Racing/HTP Motorsport	Mercedes-AMG GT4	33	(United States) Russell Ward	1–7, 9–10
(Germany) Winward Racing/HTP Motorsport	Mercedes-AMG GT4	57	(United States) Bryce Ward	1–4, 6–7, 9–10
(Germany) Winward Racing/HTP Motorsport	Mercedes-AMG GT4	57	(Netherlands) Indy Dontje	1–4, 6, 10
(Germany) Winward Racing/HTP Motorsport	Mercedes-AMG GT4	57	(Germany) Christian Hohenadel	7, 9
(United States) Team TGM	Mercedes-AMG GT4	4	(United States) Guy Cosmo	All
(United States) Team TGM	Mercedes-AMG GT4	4	(United States) Ted Giovanis	All
(United States) Team TGM	Mercedes-AMG GT4	4	(United States) Owen Trinkler	1
(United States) Team TGM	Mercedes-AMG GT4	46	(United States) Hugh Plumb	All
(United States) Team TGM	Mercedes-AMG GT4	46	(United States) Owen Trinkler	All
(United States) Bodymotion Racing	Porsche Cayman GT4 Clubsport MR	5	(United Kingdom) Stevan McAleer	1–6
(United States) Bodymotion Racing	Porsche Cayman GT4 Clubsport MR	5	(United States) Joe Robillard	1–6
(Canada) Shining Star Motorsport by Atlantic Racing Team	Mercedes-AMG GT4	6	(Canada) Phil Holtrust	5
(Canada) Shining Star Motorsport by Atlantic Racing Team	Mercedes-AMG GT4	6	(Canada) Danny Kok	5
(United States) VOLT Racing	Ford Mustang GT4	7	(United States) Alan Brynjolfsson	All
(United States) VOLT Racing	Ford Mustang GT4	7	(United States) Trent Hindman	All
(Canada) Multimatic Motorsports	Ford Mustang GT4	8	(United States) Patrick Gallagher	All
(Canada) Multimatic Motorsports	Ford Mustang GT4	8	(United States) Chad McCumbee	All
(Canada) Multimatic Motorsports	Ford Mustang GT4	15	(Canada) Scott Maxwell	1–9
(Canada) Multimatic Motorsports	Ford Mustang GT4	15	(United States) Cole Custer	1, 10
(Canada) Multimatic Motorsports	Ford Mustang GT4	15	(United States) Ty Majeski	1, 4, 7–10
(Canada) Multimatic Motorsports	Ford Mustang GT4	15	(United States) Chase Briscoe	2–3, 5–6
(Canada) Multimatic Motorsports	Ford Mustang GT4	22	(United States) Chase Briscoe	1, 10
(Canada) Multimatic Motorsports	Ford Mustang GT4	22	(United States) Austin Cindric	1, 10
(United States) / GMG Racing (Note: Car No. 13 and 14 entered as GMG Racing and car No. 50 entered as Audi Sport Team USA / GMG Racing.); (United States) / Audi Sport Team USA / GMG Racing	Audi R8 LMS GT4	13	(United States) Daren Jorgensen	1
(United States) / GMG Racing; (United States) / Audi Sport Team USA / GMG Racing	Audi R8 LMS GT4	13	(United Kingdom) Rick Parfitt Jr.	1
(United States) / GMG Racing; (United States) / Audi Sport Team USA / GMG Racing	Audi R8 LMS GT4	13	(United States) Cameron Lawrence	1
(United States) / GMG Racing; (United States) / Audi Sport Team USA / GMG Racing	Audi R8 LMS GT4	14	(United States) Andrew Davis	1
(United States) / GMG Racing; (United States) / Audi Sport Team USA / GMG Racing	Audi R8 LMS GT4	14	(United States) George Kurtz	1
(United States) / GMG Racing; (United States) / Audi Sport Team USA / GMG Racing	Audi R8 LMS GT4	14	(United States) James Sofronas	1
(United States) / GMG Racing; (United States) / Audi Sport Team USA / GMG Racing	Audi R8 LMS GT4	50	(United States) Ashley Freiberg	1
(United States) / GMG Racing; (United States) / Audi Sport Team USA / GMG Racing	Audi R8 LMS GT4	50	(Poland) Gosia Rdest	1
(United States) RS1	Porsche Cayman GT4 Clubsport MR	18	(Canada) Daniel Morad	1
(United States) RS1	Porsche Cayman GT4 Clubsport MR	18	(United States) Spencer Pumpelly	1
(United States) RS1	Porsche Cayman GT4 Clubsport MR	18	(Belgium) Jan Heylen	9
(United States) RS1	Porsche Cayman GT4 Clubsport MR	18	(United States) Cavan O'Keefe	9
(United States) RS1	Porsche Cayman GT4 Clubsport MR	18	(United States) Jason Hart	10
(United States) RS1	Porsche Cayman GT4 Clubsport MR	18	(United States) Curt Swearingin	10
(United States) RS1	Porsche Cayman GT4 Clubsport MR	28	(United States) Dillon Machavern	All
(United States) RS1	Porsche Cayman GT4 Clubsport MR	28	(United States) Spencer Pumpelly	All
(United States) Stephen Cameron Racing	Mercedes-AMG GT4 2 BMW M4 GT4 8	19	(United States) Ari Balogh	All
(United States) Stephen Cameron Racing	Mercedes-AMG GT4 2 BMW M4 GT4 8	19	(United States) Greg Liefooghe	All
(United States) Stephen Cameron Racing	BMW M4 GT4	88	(United States) Henry Schmitt	7–9
(United States) Stephen Cameron Racing	BMW M4 GT4	88	(United States) Chris Miller	7
(United States) Stephen Cameron Racing	BMW M4 GT4	88	(United States) Ari Balogh	8–9
(United States) Classic BMW	BMW M4 GT4	26	(United States) Toby Grahovec	2–5, 8
(United States) Classic BMW	BMW M4 GT4	26	(Canada) Jayson Clunie	2, 5, 8
(United States) Classic BMW	BMW M4 GT4	26	(United States) Ray Mason	3
(United States) Classic BMW	BMW M4 GT4	26	(United States) Matt Travis	4
(United States) Classic BMW	BMW M4 GT4	26	(United States) Jason Hart	4
(United States) Classic BMW	BMW M4 GT4	72	(United States) Jason Hart	1–2, 8
(United States) Classic BMW	BMW M4 GT4	72	(United States) Mike Vess	1–2, 8
(United States) Classic BMW	BMW M4 GT4	72	(United States) Toby Grahovec	1
(United States) BGB Motorsports	Porsche Cayman GT4 Clubsport MR	38	(United States) James Cox	1–4, 7, 10
(United States) BGB Motorsports	Porsche Cayman GT4 Clubsport MR	38	(United States) Dylan Murry	1–4, 7, 10
(United States) BGB Motorsports	Porsche Cayman GT4 Clubsport MR	38	(United States) David Murry	1
(United States) Carbahn Motorsports	Audi R8 LMS GT4	39	(United States) Jeff Westphal	All
(United States) Carbahn Motorsports	Audi R8 LMS GT4	39	(United States) Tyler McQuarrie	1–2, 4–10
(United States) Carbahn Motorsports	Audi R8 LMS GT4	39	(United States) Mark Siegal	3
(United States) PF Racing	Ford Mustang GT4	40	(United States) Jade Buford	10
(United States) PF Racing	Ford Mustang GT4	40	(United States) James Pesek	10
(United States) Murillo Racing	Mercedes-AMG GT4	56	(United States) Eric Foss	All
(United States) Murillo Racing	Mercedes-AMG GT4	56	(United States) Jeff Mosing	All
(United States) Murillo Racing	Mercedes-AMG GT4	65	(United States) Tim Probert	2–10
(United States) Murillo Racing	Mercedes-AMG GT4	65	(United States) Brent Mosing	2–3, 7–10
(United States) Murillo Racing	Mercedes-AMG GT4	65	(United States) Justin Piscitell	4–6
(United States) KohR Motorsports	Ford Mustang GT4	59	(United States) Joey Atterbury	1–3, 6–10
(United States) KohR Motorsports	Ford Mustang GT4	59	(United States) Jack Roush Jr.	1–4, 6–10
(United States) KohR Motorsports	Ford Mustang GT4	59	(United States) Jade Buford	1
(United States) KohR Motorsports	Ford Mustang GT4	59	(United States) Andy Lally	4
(United States) KohR Motorsports	Ford Mustang GT4	60	(Canada) Kyle Marcelli	All
(United States) KohR Motorsports	Ford Mustang GT4	60	(United States) Nate Stacy	All
(United States) DXDT Racing	Mercedes-AMG GT4	63	(United States) David Askew	1
(United States) DXDT Racing	Mercedes-AMG GT4	63	(United States) Aaron Povoledo	1
(Canada) Motorsport in Action	McLaren 570S GT4	69	(United States) Corey Fergus	1–5, 7–10
(Canada) Motorsport in Action	McLaren 570S GT4	69	(Canada) Jesse Lazare	1–5, 7–10
(United States) Rebel Rock Racing	Chevrolet Camaro GT4.R	71	(United States) Andrew Davis	8–10
(United States) Rebel Rock Racing	Chevrolet Camaro GT4.R	71	(United Kingdom) Robin Liddell	8–10
(Canada) Compass Racing	McLaren 570S GT4	76	(United States) Matt Plumb	All
(Canada) Compass Racing	McLaren 570S GT4	76	(United States) Paul Holton	1–8, 10
(Canada) Compass Racing	McLaren 570S GT4	76	(United States) Nico Rondet	9
(Canada) Andrew Wojteczko Autosport	Ford Mustang GT4	80	(Canada) Martin Barkey	All
(Canada) Andrew Wojteczko Autosport	Ford Mustang GT4	80	(United States) Brett Sandberg	All
(United States) BimmerWorld Racing	BMW M4 GT4	82	(United States) James Clay	All
(United States) BimmerWorld Racing	BMW M4 GT4	82	(United States) Tyler Cooke	All
(United States) Quest Racing	Mercedes-AMG GT4	92	(United States) Mark Ramsey	All
(United States) Quest Racing	Mercedes-AMG GT4	92	(France) Alexandre Prémat	1–8
(United States) Quest Racing	Mercedes-AMG GT4	92	(United States) Roger Eagleton	9–10

=== Touring Car ===
Team	Car	No.	Drivers	Rounds
(United States) eEuroparts.com Racing	Audi RS 3 LMS TCR	10	(United States) Lee Carpentier	All
(United States) eEuroparts.com Racing	Audi RS 3 LMS TCR	10	(Cayman Islands) Kieron O'Rourke	All
(United States) eEuroparts.com Racing	Audi RS 3 LMS TCR	12	(United States) Kenton Koch	4, 6–10
(United States) eEuroparts.com Racing	Audi RS 3 LMS TCR	12	(United States) Tom O'Gorman	4, 6–10
(United States) RS Werkes Racing	Audi RS 3 LMS TCR	11	(United States) Don Istook	1–4, 6, 8
(United States) RS Werkes Racing	Audi RS 3 LMS TCR	11	(United States) JT Coupal	1
(United States) RS Werkes Racing	Audi RS 3 LMS TCR	11	(United States) Ethan Low	2
(United States) RS Werkes Racing	Audi RS 3 LMS TCR	11	(South Africa) Mikey Taylor	3–4, 6, 8, 10
(United States) RS Werkes Racing	Audi RS 3 LMS TCR	11	(United States) Tyler Stone	10
(United States) Rumcastle, LLC	Volkswagen Golf GTI TCR	31	(United States) Luke Rumburg	1–4, 6, 8, 10
(United States) Rumcastle, LLC	Volkswagen Golf GTI TCR	31	(United States) Tanner Rumburg	1–4, 6, 8, 10
(United States) Rumcastle, LLC	Volkswagen Golf GTI TCR	31	(United States) Jon Miller	1
(United States) Rumcastle, LLC	Volkswagen Golf GTI TCR	31	(Puerto Rico) Bryan Ortiz	4
(United States) Rumcastle, LLC	Volkswagen Golf GTI TCR	32	(United States) Rob Ferriol	8
(United States) Rumcastle, LLC	Volkswagen Golf GTI TCR	32	(United States) DJ Fitzpatrick	8
(United States) Rumcastle, LLC	Volkswagen Golf GTI TCR	32	(United States) Mark Brummond	10
(United States) Rumcastle, LLC	Volkswagen Golf GTI TCR	32	(United States) Pat Wilmot	10
(United States) Murillo Racing	Audi RS 3 LMS TCR	53	(United States) Matthew Fassnacht	1
(United States) Murillo Racing	Audi RS 3 LMS TCR	53	(United States) Justin Pisctell	1
(United States) JDC-Miller MotorSports	Audi RS 3 LMS TCR	54	(United States) Michael Johnson	3–10
(United States) JDC-Miller MotorSports	Audi RS 3 LMS TCR	54	(South Africa) Stephen Simpson	3–10
(United States) Roadshagger Racing	Audi RS 3 LMS TCR	61	(United States) Gavin Ernstone	6, 9
(United States) Roadshagger Racing	Audi RS 3 LMS TCR	61	(United States) Jonathan Morley	6, 9
(United States) Strom Motorsports	Audi RS 3 LMS TCR	67	(United States) David Depillo	6
(United States) Strom Motorsports	Audi RS 3 LMS TCR	67	(United States) Brett Strom	6
(Canada) Compass Racing	Audi RS 3 LMS TCR	74	(United States) Rodrigo Sales	All
(Canada) Compass Racing	Audi RS 3 LMS TCR	74	(Canada) Kuno Wittmer	All
(Canada) Compass Racing	Audi RS 3 LMS TCR	75	(Argentina) Roy Block	All
(Canada) Compass Racing	Audi RS 3 LMS TCR	75	(Brazil) Pierre Kleinubing	All
(Canada) Compass Racing	Audi RS 3 LMS TCR	77	(United States) Britt Casey Jr.	All
(Canada) Compass Racing	Audi RS 3 LMS TCR	77	(United States) Tom Long	All

=== Street Tuner ===
Team	Car	No.	Drivers	Rounds
(United States) Bodymotion Racing	Porsche Cayman	21	(United States) Max Faulkner	All
(United States) Bodymotion Racing	Porsche Cayman	21	(United States) Jason Rabe	All
(United Kingdom) MINI JCW Team	Mini JCW	37	(United States) Derek Jones	All
(United Kingdom) MINI JCW Team	Mini JCW	37	(United States) Nate Norenberg	All
(United Kingdom) MINI JCW Team	Mini JCW	52	(United States) Mark Pombo	All
(United Kingdom) MINI JCW Team	Mini JCW	52	(United States) Jared Salinsky	1–2
(United Kingdom) MINI JCW Team	Mini JCW	52	(United States) Tyler Stone	1
(United Kingdom) MINI JCW Team	Mini JCW	52	(United States) Colin Mullan	3–9
(United Kingdom) MINI JCW Team	Mini JCW	52	(United States) Luis Perocarpi	10
(United Kingdom) MINI JCW Team	Mini JCW	73	(United States) Mike LaMarra	All
(United Kingdom) MINI JCW Team	Mini JCW	73	(United States) Mat Pombo	All
(United States) Murillo Racing	Porsche Cayman	55	(United States) Brent Mosing	1
(United States) Murillo Racing	Porsche Cayman	55	(United States) Justin Piscitell	1
(United States) Murillo Racing	Porsche Cayman	55	(United States) Tim Probert	1
(United States) Riley Racing	Mazda MX-5	66	(United States) AJ Riley	4, 6
(United States) Riley Racing	Mazda MX-5	66	(United States) Jameson Riley	4, 6
(United States) BimmerWorld Racing	BMW 328i (F30)	81	(Canada) Nick Galante	All
(United States) BimmerWorld Racing	BMW 328i (F30)	81	(United States) Devin Jones	All

== Race results ==
Bold indicates overall winner.

Rnd	Circuit	GS Winning Car	TCR Winning Car	ST Winning Team
Rnd	Circuit	GS Winning Drivers	TCR Winning Drivers	ST Winning Drivers
1	Daytona	**(United States) No. 28 RS1**	(Canada) No. 77 Compass Racing	(United States) No. 81 BimmerWorld Racing
1	Daytona	**(United States) Dillon Machavern** **(United States) Spencer Pumpelly**	(United States) Britt Casey Jr. (United States) Tom Long	(Canada) Nick Galante (United States) Devin Jones
2	Sebring	**(United States) No. 60 KohR Motorsports**	(Canada) No. 74 Compass Racing	(United Kingdom) No. 52 MINI JCW Team
2	Sebring	**(Canada) Kyle Marcelli** **(United States) Nate Stacy**	(United States) Rodrigo Sales (Canada) Kuno Wittmer	(United States) Mark Pombo (United States) Jared Salinsky
3	Mid-Ohio	**(United States) No. 60 KohR Motorsports**	(Canada) No. 74 Compass Racing	(United Kingdom) No. 73 MINI JCW Team
3	Mid-Ohio	**(Canada) Kyle Marcelli** **(United States) Nate Stacy**	(United States) Rodrigo Sales (Canada) Kuno Wittmer	(United States) Mike LaMarra (United States) Mat Pombo
4	Watkins Glen	**(Canada) No. 8 Multimatic Motorsports**	(Canada) No. 77 Compass Racing	(United Kingdom) No. 52 MINI JCW Team
4	Watkins Glen	**(United States) Patrick Gallagher** **(United States) Chad McCumbee**	(United States) Britt Casey Jr. (United States) Tom Long	(United States) Colin Mullan (United States) Mark Pombo
5	Mosport	**(United States) No. 60 KohR Motorsports**	(Canada) No. 77 Compass Racing	(United States) No. 81 BimmerWorld Racing
5	Mosport	**(Canada) Kyle Marcelli** **(United States) Nate Stacy**	(United States) Britt Casey Jr. (United States) Tom Long	(Canada) Nick Galante (United States) Devin Jones
6	Lime Rock	**(United States) No. 46 Team TGM**	(United States) No. 54 JDC-Miller MotorSports	(United Kingdom) No. 73 Mini JCW Team
6	Lime Rock	**(United States) Hugh Plumb** **(United States) Owen Trinkler**	(United States) Michael Johnson (South Africa) Stephen Simpson	(United States) Mike LaMarra (United States) Mat Pombo
7	Road America	**(United States) No. 7 VOLT Racing**	(Canada) No. 74 Compass Racing	(United States) No. 81 BimmerWorld Racing
7	Road America	**(United States) Alan Brynjolfsson** **(United States) Trent Hindman**	(United States) Rodrigo Sales (Canada) Kuno Wittmer	(Canada) Nick Galante (United States) Devin Jones
8	Virginia	**(United States) No. 46 Team TGM**	(United States) No. 12 eEuroparts.com Racing	(United Kingdom) No. 52 MINI JCW Team
8	Virginia	**(United States) Hugh Plumb** **(United States) Owen Trinkler**	(United States) Kenton Koch (United States) Tom O'Gorman	(United States) Colin Mullan (United States) Mark Pombo
9	Laguna Seca	**(United States) No. 46 Team TGM**	(Canada) No. 77 Compass Racing	(United States) No. 81 BimmerWorld Racing
9	Laguna Seca	**(United States) Hugh Plumb** **(United States) Owen Trinkler**	(United States) Britt Casey Jr. (United States) Tom Long	(Canada) Nick Galante (United States) Devin Jones
10	Road Atlanta	**(United States) No. 82 BimmerWorld Racing**	(United States) No. 12 eEuroparts.com Racing	(United Kingdom) No. 73 MINI JCW Team
10	Road Atlanta	**(United States) James Clay** **(United States) Tyler Cooke**	(United States) Kenton Koch (United States) Tom O'Gorman	(United States) Mike LaMarra (United States) Mat Pombo

== Team's Championship Standings ==
=== GS Team's Championship (top 10) ===
Pos.	Team	Car	DAY	SEB	MOH	WGL	MOS	LIM	ELK	VIR	LGA	ATL	Total
1	#46 Team TGM	Mercedes-AMG GT4	6	8	4	5	7	1	3	1	1	11	281
2	#60 KohR Motorsports	Ford Mustang GT4	23	1	1	3	1	9	13	5	10	5	256
3	#82 BimmerWorld Racing	BMW M4 GT4	2	11	3	2	8	7	9	17	11	1	252
4	#28 RS1	Porsche Cayman GT4 Clubsport MR	1	3	6	7	17	3	2	18	7	8	250
5	#39 Carbahn Motorsports	Audi R8 LMS GT4	22	5	12	4	6	18	4	12	3	4	225
6	#8 Multimatic Motorsports	Ford Mustang GT4	27	19	2	1	5	15	7	4	9	10	220
7	#56 Murillo Racing	Mercedes-AMG GT4	7	22	9	8	10	5	8	7	5	23	206
8	#7 VOLT Racing	Ford Mustang GT4	8	25	17	13	4	14	1	8	4	24	200
9	#80 Andrew Wojteczko Autosport	Ford Mustang GT4	10	14	10	15	2	13	6	14	15	15	199
10	#19 Stephen Cameron Racing	Mercedes-AMG GT4	14	4									199
10	#19 Stephen Cameron Racing	BMW M4 GT4			8	6	9	19	10	20	16	6	199
