= The Truth About Cars =

Automotive Blog

- Website type: Automotive
- Owner: VerticalScope
- Website: www.thetruthaboutcars.com
- Commercial: Yes
- Registration: Optional
- Launched: November 14, 2001; 24 years ago
- Current status: Online

The Truth About Cars (TTAC) is a blog covering automobiles, automotive products and the auto industry, begun in 2002 featuring a mix of automotive reviews, editorials and news. It was home to the annual Ten Worst Automobiles awards, which are nominated and selected by the readers. It also featured multiple series predicting the demise of US automakers, namely GM and Ford "Death Watch" and Chrysler "Suicide Watch" series.

== History ==
Founded by Robert Farago in 2002, The Truth About Cars publicised itself as an independent voice in the automotive media, at a time when many outlets were coming under fire for their close ties with advertisers, particularly auto manufacturers. TTAC adopted an adversarial tone, particularly with regard to the Big Three domestic auto makers. This was exacerbated by Farago's "GM Death Watch" series, which correctly predicted the bankruptcy of General Motors over a 200+ part series. In 2012, TTAC revived the "Death Watch" series, when contributing author Mark Stevenson correctly predicted the demise of Suzuki's North American auto sales arm.

TTAC's review comparing the grille of the Subaru B9 Tribeca to a vagina caused BMW to officially stop providing review cars.

After being acquired by VerticalScope, a Canadian online media firm, Farago departed, and Ed Niedermeyer became Editor-In-Chief in 2010.

A 2013 article titled "Small SUV Crashopalooza: Detroit Loses, Dykes Win" resulted in a falling-out among senior contributors and eventually changes in the managing staff.

In 2013, Jack Baruth posted an article announcing that Bertel Schmitt had left the blog and that he (Baruth) and Derek Kreindler would be taking over. Baruth promised a "reboot" with previously banned commenters being welcomed back.

After Kreindler left the blog in April 2015, the Editor In Chief role was transitioned to a team at AutoGuide while Mark Stevenson became the Managing Editor. Stevenson remained the Managing Editor until that role was taken over by Tim Healey in August 2017. Jack Baruth left the blog in 2018.

== Recognition ==
Forbes magazine listed TTAC as a "Best of the Web" automotive blog as far back as 2005. PC Magazine listed TTAC as one of its "100 Favorite Blogs" in 2007. Time magazine called TTAC one of the 25 "Best Blogs of 2011".
