= 2016 Audi Sport TT Cup =

The 2016 Audi Sport TT Cup was the second season of the Audi Sport TT Cup. It began on 7 May at Hockenheim and finished on 16 October at Hockenheim after seven double-header meetings, all of which are support events for the Deutsche Tourenwagen Masters and 24 Hours Nürburgring.

== Entry list ==
On 7 March 2016, 14 out of 20 drivers were announced.

No.	Drivers	Rounds
2	(Germany) Kevin Strohschänk	1–5
3	(Poland) Gosia Rdest	All
4	(Finland) Joonas Lappalainen	All
5	(Denmark) Nicklas Nielsen	All
6	(Bulgaria) Pavel Lefterov	1–5
7	(Germany) Christoph Hofbauer	1–2, 5–7
11	(Austria) Max Hofer	All
12	(Sweden) Simon Larsson	All
14	(United Kingdom) Josh Caygill	All
23	(United Kingdom) Philip Ellis	All
27	(Germany) Dennis Marschall	All
31	(South Africa) Sheldon van der Linde	All
33	(Finland) Emil Lindholm	All
42	(Denmark) Patrick Egsgaard	All
76	(United States) Paul Holton	1–5, 7
91	(Switzerland) Yves Meyer	All
Guest drivers
93	(Germany) Michael Waldherr	7
94	(Kuwait) Zaid Ashkanani	3
94	(Kuwait) Drew Ridge	7
95	(Lebanon) Edy Saaiby	3
95	(Netherlands) Bernhard van Oranje	4
95	(New Zealand) Simon Evans	5
95	(Netherlands) Milan Dontje	6–7
96	(Norway) Andreas Mikkelsen	1
96	(Germany) Miriam Höller	2
96	(Germany) Michael Henke	3
96	(France) Adrien Théaux	4
96	(Germany) Benedikt Mayr	5
96	(United Kingdom) Chaz Davies	6
96	(Germany) Jimi Blue Ochsenknecht	7
97	(United States) Scott Speed	1
97	(Germany) Heinz Müller	2
97	(Spain) Marcos Martínez	3
97	(Italy) Peter Fill	4
97	(Germany) Tayfun Baydar	5
97	(Spain) Xavi Forés	6
97	(United Kingdom) Timothy Burton	7
98	(France) Mathieu Sentis	1
98	(United Kingdom) Richard Meaden	2
98	(Norway) Atle Gulbrandsen	3
98	(Belgium) Xavier Daffe	4
98	(Finland) Robert Koistinen	5
98	(Germany) Jörg Petersen	6
98	(Denmark) Flemming Haslund	7
99	(Czech Republic) Jakub Rejlek	1
99	(Germany) Sönke Brederlow	2
99	(Brazil) Lucas di Grassi	3
99	(Netherlands) Allard Kalff	4
99	(Hungary) Gábor Telek	6
99	(South Africa) Jesse Adams	7

== Race calendar and results ==
Round		Circuit	Date	Pole position	Fastest lap	Winning driver
1	R1	(Germany) Hockenheimring, Baden-Württemberg	7 May	(Germany) Dennis Marschall	(South Africa) Sheldon van der Linde	(South Africa) Sheldon van der Linde
1	R2	(Germany) Hockenheimring, Baden-Württemberg	8 May	(Germany) Dennis Marschall	(South Africa) Sheldon van der Linde	(South Africa) Sheldon van der Linde
2	R1	(Germany) Nürburgring, Rhineland-Palatinate (Grand Prix Circuit)	27 May	(Germany) Dennis Marschall	(Germany) Dennis Marschall	(Germany) Dennis Marschall
2	R2	(Germany) Nürburgring, Rhineland-Palatinate (Grand Prix Circuit)	28 May	(South Africa) Sheldon van der Linde	(Germany) Dennis Marschall	(South Africa) Sheldon van der Linde
3	R1	(Germany) Norisring, Nuremberg	25 June	(Germany) Dennis Marschall	(Germany) Dennis Marschall (Note: Actual fastest lap achieved by guest driver Lucas di Grassi.)	(Germany) Dennis Marschall
3	R2	(Germany) Norisring, Nuremberg	26 June	(Germany) Dennis Marschall	(United States) Paul Holton	(Finland) Joonas Lappalainen (Note: Actual victory achieved by guest driver Lucas di Grassi.)
4	R1	(Netherlands) Circuit Park Zandvoort, North Holland	16 July	(Denmark) Nicklas Nielsen	(Germany) Dennis Marschall	(Denmark) Nicklas Nielsen
4	R2	(Netherlands) Circuit Park Zandvoort, North Holland	17 July	(South Africa) Sheldon van der Linde	(South Africa) Sheldon van der Linde	(South Africa) Sheldon van der Linde
5	R1	(Germany) Nürburgring, Rhineland-Palatinate	10 September	(South Africa) Sheldon van der Linde	(Finland) Joonas Lappalainen	(Finland) Joonas Lappalainen
5	R2	(Germany) Nürburgring, Rhineland-Palatinate	11 September	(South Africa) Sheldon van der Linde	(Finland) Joonas Lappalainen	(Finland) Joonas Lappalainen
6	R1	(Hungary) Hungaroring, Mogyoród	24 September	(Germany) Dennis Marschall	(Germany) Dennis Marschall	(Germany) Dennis Marschall
6	R2	(Hungary) Hungaroring, Mogyoród	25 September	(Germany) Dennis Marschall	(Germany) Dennis Marschall	(Germany) Dennis Marschall
7	R1	(Germany) Hockenheimring, Baden-Württemberg	15 October	(Finland) Joonas Lappalainen	(South Africa) Sheldon van der Linde	(Finland) Joonas Lappalainen
7	R2	(Germany) Hockenheimring, Baden-Württemberg	16 October	(Germany) Dennis Marschall	(Denmark) Nicklas Nielsen	(Germany) Dennis Marschall

== Championship standings ==
Scoring system

Points were awarded to the top eighteen classified finishers as follows:

Position	**1st**	**2nd**	**3rd**	**4th**	**5th**	**6th**	**7th**	**8th**	**9th**	**10th**	**11th**	**12th**	**13th**	**14th**	**15th**	**16th**	**17th**	**18th**
Points	25	21	18	16	14	13	12	11	10	9	8	7	6	5	4	3	2	1

=== Drivers' championship ===
Pos.	Driver	HOC (Germany)		NÜR (Germany)		NOR (Germany)		ZAN (Netherlands)		NÜR (Germany)		HUN (Hungary)		HOC (Germany)		Points
1	(Finland) Joonas Lappalainen	3	4	2	3	3	2	5	5	1	1	2	2	**1**	3	282
2	(Germany) Dennis Marschall	**2**	**5**	**1**	2	**1**	**4**	3	4	5	13	**1**	**1**	5	**1**	269
3	(Denmark) Nicklas Nielsen	10	2	6	4	8	6	**1**	2	6	2	3	7	2	2	238
4	(South Africa) Sheldon van der Linde	1	1	7	**1**	4	Ret	2	**1**	**8**	**Ret**	4	3	3	4	231
5	(Finland) Emil Lindholm	12	7	4	5	5	3	6	7	2	Ret	Ret	5	4	7	177
6	(United Kingdom) Philip Ellis	14	9	5	6	6	8	4	6	4	3	5	4	19	Ret	170
7	(Austria) Max Hofer	8	8	19	7	9	10	7	3	Ret	4	6	8	7	6	156
8	(Poland) Gosia Rdest	6	10	8	12	Ret	5	8	9	3	5	8	12	9	10	149
9	(Germany) Christoph Hofbauer	6	3	3	8					6	Ret	7	6	6	9	125
10	(United Kingdom) Josh Caygill	5	6	9	9	Ret	11	12	10	15	7	9	9	18	Ret	117
11	(Denmark) Patrick Egsgaard	Ret	13	15	10	Ret	9	9	8	11	10	Ret	11	10	11	100
12	(Sweden) Simon Larsson	15	15	12	11	12	14	Ret	12	12	9	12	14	11	Ret	96
13	(Switzerland) Yves Meyer	Ret	18	14	13	11	DNS	Ret	DNS	10	6	11	16	12	13	81
14	(United States) Paul Holton	11	12	10	18	Ret	7	10	16	Ret	Ret			Ret	8	70
15	(Germany) Kevin Strohschänk	16	20	18	Ret	13	13	15	15	13	11					58
16	(Bulgaria) Pavel Lefterov	Ret	16	11	14	Ret	16	11	13	Ret	DNS					39
Guest drivers ineligible for championship points
	(Brazil) Lucas di Grassi					2	1									0
	(United States) Scott Speed	7	11													0
	(Kuwait) Zaid Ashkanani					7	12									0
	(New Zealand) Simon Evans									7	8					0
	(Norway) Andreas Mikkelsen	9	17													0
	(Netherlands) Milan Dontje											10	10	8	5	0
	(Spain) Marcos Martínez					10	Ret									0
	(Finland) Robert Koistinen									14	12					0
	(Germany) Michael Waldherr													14	12	0
	(Netherlands) Allard Kalff							13	11							0
	(France) Mathieu Sentis	13	14													0
	(Hungary) Gábor Telek											14	13			0
	(Spain) Xavi Forés											13	15			0
	(South Africa) Jesse Adams													13	15	0
	(United Kingdom) Richard Meaden			13	17											0
	(Netherlands) Bernhard van Oranje							14	14							0
	(Lebanon) Edy Saaiby					14	15									0
	(Australia) Drew Ridge													15	14	0
	(Germany) Tayfun Baydar									Ret	14					0
	(Germany) Jörg Petersen											15	17			0
	(Germany) Sönke Brederlow			17	15											0
	(Germany) Heinz Müller			16	16											0
	(Denmark) Flemming Haslund													16	17	0
	(United Kingdom) Timothy Burton													17	16	0
	(France) Adrien Théaux							16	19							0
	(Germany) Benedikt Mayr									16	Ret					0
	(Italy) Peter Fill							17	18							0
	(Germany) Michael Henke					DNS	17									0
	(Belgium) Xavier Daffe							Ret	17							0
	(Czech Republic) Jakub Rejlek	Ret	19													0
	(Germany) Miriam Höller			20	DNS											0
	(United Kingdom) Chaz Davies											Ret	Ret			0
	(Norway) Atle Gulbrandsen					Ret	DNS									0
	(Germany) Jimi Blue Ochsenknecht													DNQ	DNQ	0
Pos.	Driver	HOC (Germany)		NÜR (Germany)		NOR (Germany)		ZAN (Netherlands)		NÜR (Germany)		HUN (Hungary)		HOC (Germany)		Points

Colour	Result
Gold	Winner
Silver	Second place
Bronze	Third place
Green	Points classification
Blue	Non-points classification
Blue	Non-classified finish (NC)
Purple	Retired, not classified (Ret)
Red	Did not qualify (DNQ)
Red	Did not pre-qualify (DNPQ)
Black	Disqualified (DSQ)
White	Did not start (DNS)
White	Withdrew (WD)
White	Race cancelled (C)
Blank	Did not practice (DNP)
Blank	Did not arrive (DNA)
Blank	Excluded (EX)

**Bold** – Pole
Italics – Fastest Lap
