= Tom O'Gorman =

American racing driver (born 1991)

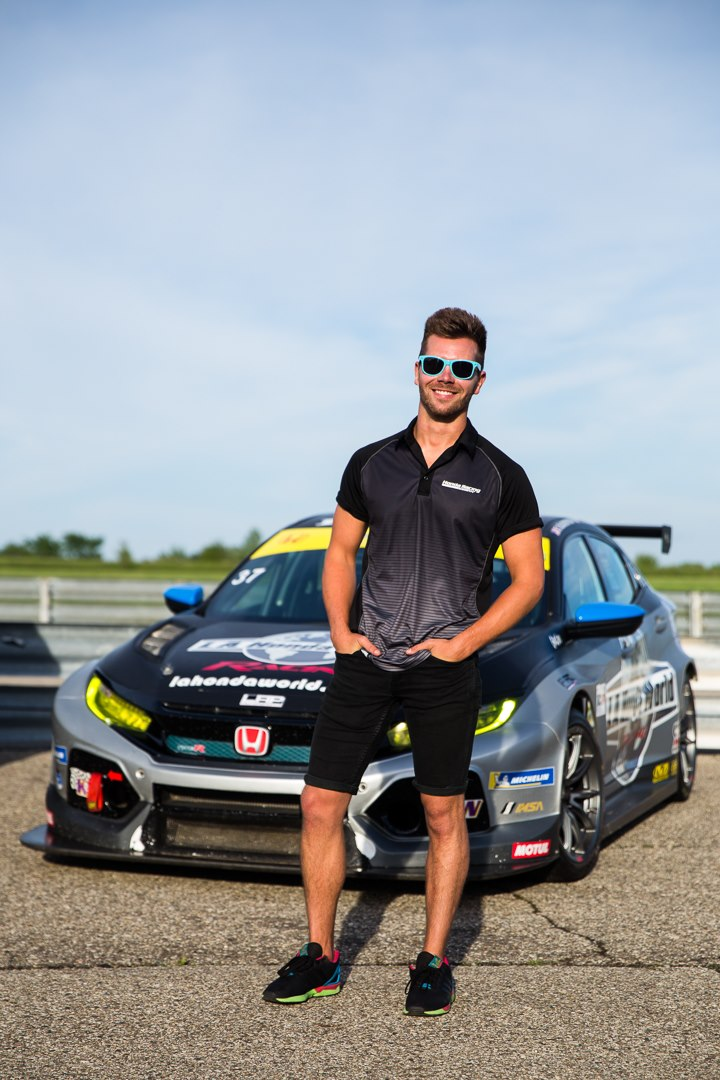
- Born: October 22, 1991 (age 35) Cincinnati, Ohio, United States

IMSA Michelin Pilot Challenge career
- Debut season: 2018
- Current team: Rockwell Autosport Development; TOMO Racing
- Car number: 15; 94
- Former teams: HPD/Honda Racing; LA Honda World; ASM; Shea Racing
- Starts: 148
- Wins: 42
- Podiums: 41
- Poles: 36
- Fastest laps: 36

Championship titles
- 2012 2013 2014 2016 2017 2018 2019 2021 2022 2023: SCCA ProSolo National STS; SCCA ProSolo National S4; SCCA Solo Nationals F Prepared; ARRC - ITC; Pirelli World Challenge TCB; ARRC - ECR; SCCA Solo Nationals F Prepared; SCCA Solo Nationals BSP; Pirelli World Challenge TCA; SCCA Solo Nationals F Prepared; SCCA Solo Nationals SS; Gridlife Touring Cup Champion; Champ Car Endurance Series
- Statistics up to date as of 3 February 2024.

Tom O'Gorman (born October 22, 1991) is an American racing driver from Cincinnati, Ohio, USA.

O'Gorman has competed in many series of motorsport with success, including, SCCA Solo Autocross, SCCA ProSolo, SCCA Time Trials, UMI's King of the Mountain, One Lap of America, WRL, 25 Hours of Thunderhill, ChampCar Endurance Series, Pirelli World Challenge, Gridlife Touring Cup, and Michelin Pilot Challenge.

== Career ==
=== Early career ===
O'Gorman's interest in motorsport began at a very young age. He played many racing games as a kid, such as Gran Turismo, Live for Speed, and TOCA Race Driver.

=== SCCA ===
O'Gorman started competing at local Cincinnati region SCCA autocross events as a teenager in 2007.

O'Gorman's first SCCA Solo National Tour event was in 2008 in Peru, IN, where he placed first in Street Touring S2 in a 1990 Mazda Miata

O'Gorman's first SCCA Solo Nationals event was in 2009 at Lincoln Air Park, which was the first year that event was held at that location.

In 2012. O'Gorman won his first SCCA ProSolo National in a 1988 Honda CRX Si.

In 2013, O'Gorman won his first SCCA Solo Nationals in a 1972 Porsche 914/6, and was also awarded the Driver of the Year Award. In that same year, he also won the SCCA Triad Award, for accomplishing three feats in a single class: win two regular season achievements and a National Championship, all in the same class.

Since then, O'Gorman has gone on to win five Solo Nationals Championships and two ProSolo National Championships total.

=== Pirelli World Challenge ===
O'Gorman started racing his own car in 2015, a Honda Fit, made possible by a crowd fund from the people who knew him.

O'Gorman teamed up with Black Armor Helmets for 2016, and ended up winning the TCB Championship with that Honda Fit.

In 2017, O'Gorman was a part of Shea Racing, and moved up to TCA, in a 2017 Honda Civic Si. He finished third in the championship that year.

In 2018, determined to win, O'Gorman took his Honda Civic Si to first in the TCA Drivers' Championship and a second place in the TCA Team Championship for TOMO Racing.

=== IMSA Continental Tire Challenge & Michelin Pilot Challenge ===
O'Gorman was joined by Kenton Koch in the 2018 Continental Tire SportsCar Challenge, behind the wheel of an Audi RS 3 LMS TCR. After making their debut mid-season at Watkins Glen, the duo claimed race victories at Virginia and Road Atlanta before season's end.

In 2019, O'Gorman joined the LA Honda World Racing team, co-driving their Honda Civic Type R TCR along with Shelby Blackstock. They saw success, with two wins, one at Daytona, and one at Sebring, and two more podiums that year. Unfortunately a few mechanical issues hurt their season points that year.

O'Gorman was able to get back into the IMSA Michelin Pilot Challenge through Rockwell Autosport Development (RAD) in 2023 at Daytona, unfortunately the car was involved in an incident before he was able to drive the car. That was the only IMSA event he participated in that year.

Rockwell Autosport Development once again invited O'Gorman to drive the car at Daytona in 2024. This time it ended much better, the team and O'Gorman finished fourth in the TCR class.

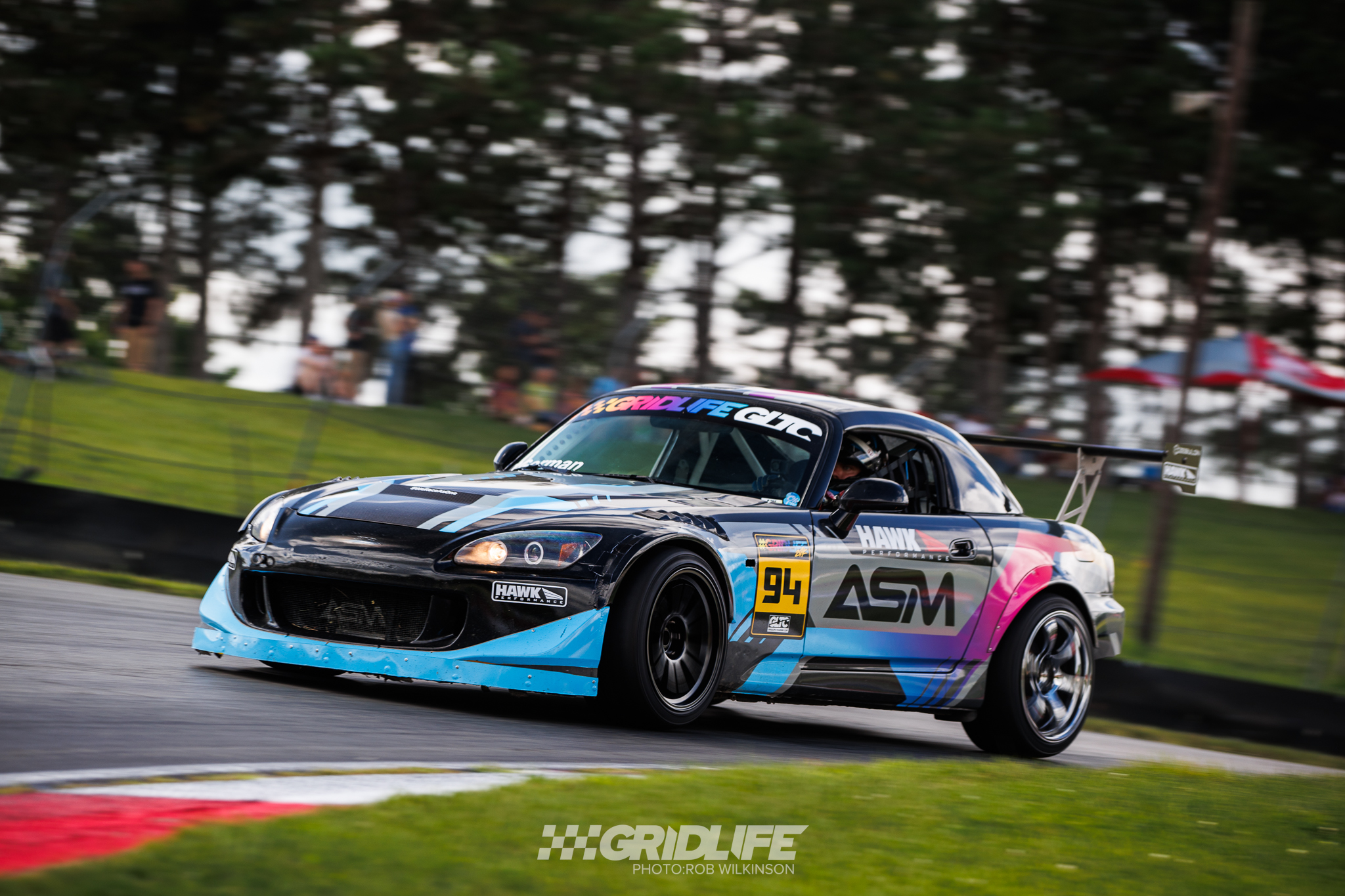
Tom O'Gorman in his #94 ASM Honda S2000 GLTC racecar at Mid-Ohio

=== Gridlife Touring Cup (GLTC) ===
O'Gorman began racing in Gridlife Touring Cup in 2020, with a car he bought, a yellow Honda S2000.

O'Gorman teamed up with ASM (Andy Smedegard Motorsports) for the 2021, 2022, and 2023 seasons. He won the GLTC Championship in 2022, one of the most difficult championships to win in grassroots racing.

In 2023, O'Gorman only did four races, after deciding to take a step back and focus on driver coaching and team support.

== Personal life ==
Early in his life, O'Gorman attended Ohio State University for one year, before deciding to focus on his racing career.

== Racing Record ==
=== Career Highlights Summary ===
2008

- 2008 - SCCA Solo National Tour (Peru, IN) - Street Touring S2 - 1st Place - 1990 Mazda Miata

2009

- 2009 - SCCA Solo Nationals - E Stock - 6th Place - 1993 Toyota MR2

2010

- 2010 - SCCA Solo Nationals - STS - 5th Place - 1990 Mazda Miata

2011

- 2011 - SCCA Solo Nationals - STS - 9th Place - 1988 Honda CRX Si

2012

- 2012 - SCCA Solo Nationals - STS - 3rd Place - 1988 Honda CRX Si
- 2012 - SCCA ProSolo National - STS Champion - 1988 Honda CRX Si

2013

- 2013 - SCCA Solo Nationals - F Prepared Champion - 1972 Porsche 914/6
- 2013 - SCCA ProSolo National - Stock/Street Index 4 (S4) Champion - 1999 Chevy Corvette

2014

- 2014 - American Road Race of Champions - ITC Champion - 1991 Honda Civic

2015

- 2015 - SCCA Wilmington 2 ProSolo - E Street Prepared Class Winner - 2010 Ford Shelby GT

2016

- 2016 - Pirelli World Challenge TCB Champion - Honda Fit
- 2016 - American Road Race of Champions - ECR Champion - STL 1995 Honda Civic
- 2016 - SCCA Solo Nationals - F Prepared Champion - 1972 Porsche 914/6
- 2016 - NASA 25 Hrs of Thunderhill - E1 Class - 12th Place - #93 Honda Racing/HPD 2017 Civic Si

2017

- 2017 - American Road Race of Champions - ECR - ITX 1995 Acura Integra
- 2017 - SCCA Solo Nationals - B Street Prepared Champion - 2002 Honda S2000
- 2017 - NASA 25 Hrs of Thunderhill - E0 Class - 8th Place - #18 Honda Racing/Team Honda Research West Civic Type R

2018

- 2018 - Pirelli World Challenge TCA Champion - 2017 Honda Civic Si
- 2018 - American Road Race of Champions - ECR - STU 2017 Honda Civic Si
- 2018 - SCCA Time Trials Nationals - Tuner 4 Class Winner - 2017 Honda Civic Si
- 2018 - NASA 25 Hrs of Thunderhill - E0 Class - 4th Place - #17 Honda Racing/Team Honda Research West Civic Type R

2019

- 2019 - SCCA Time Trials Nationals - Tuner 1 Class Winner - 2016 Chevy Camaro SS
- 2019 - SCCA Solo Nationals - F Prepared Champion - 2004 Honda S2000
- 2019 - NASA 25 Hrs of Thunderhill - E0 Class - 3rd Place - #18 Honda Racing/Team Honda Research West Civic Type R

2020

- 2020 - SCCA Great Lakes ProSolo (Peru, IN) - Street 5 Class Winner - 2019 Honda Civic Si

2021

- 2021 - One Lap of America Overall & Class Winner - 2019 Chevy Corvette ZR1
- 2021 - SCCA Time Trials Nationals - Sport 6 Class Winner - 2016 Scion FRS
- 2021 - SCCA Solo Nationals - Super Street Champion - 2020 Acura NSX
- 2021 - UMI's King of the Mountain - Super Late Model Class Winner - 2020 Acura NSX

2022

- 2022 - One Lap of America Overall & Class Winner - 2019 Chevy Corvette ZR1
- 2022 - SCCA Time Trials Nationals - Unlimited 1 Class Winner & Fastest Overall Lap - 2019 Chevy Corvette ZR1
- 2022 - Gridlife Touring Cup (GLTC) Champion - Honda S2000

2023

- 2023 - One Lap of America Overall & Class Winner - 2019 Porsche 911 GT3
- 2023 - Champ Car Endurance Series National Championship 14 Hrs of Road Atlanta - 1st Overall - #1 Rockwell Autosport Development 1999 Porsche Boxster (#12)
- 2023 - Champ Car Endurance Series 24 Hrs of VIR - 1st Overall - #1 Rockwell Autosport Development 1999 Porsche Boxster
- 2023 - NASA 25 Hrs of Thunderhill - E0 Class - 1st Place in Class & 3rd Overall - #25 Honda Racing/Team Honda Research West Civic Type R

2024

- 2024 - WRL Barber - GP2 Class Race 1 & 2 Winner - #715 Rockwell Autosport Development 1999 Porsche Boxster
- 2024 - One Lap of America 3rd Overall & 2nd in Class - 2019 Porsche 911 GT3
- 2024 - Champ Car Endurance Series Watkins Glen 7 Hrs - 1st in Class & 3rd Overall - #10 Rockwell Autosport Development 1999 Porsche Boxster
- 2024 - Champ Car Endurance Series 24 Hrs of VIR - 1st Overall - #12 Rockwell Autosport Development 1999 Porsche Boxster

Season	Series	Team	Races	Wins	Poles	F/Laps	Podiums	Points	Position
2015	Pirelli World Challenge - TCB	TOMO Racing	6	0	0	0	2	479	15th
2016	Pirelli World Challenge - TCB	Black Armor Helmets	10	4	2	2	6	1188	**1st**
2017	Pirelli World Challenge - TCA	Shea Racing	12	1	1	2	4	215	**3rd**
2018	Pirelli World Challenge - TCA	TOMO Racing	12	5	3	4	5	258	**1st**
2018	Continental Tire SportsCar Challenge - TCR	eEuroparts.com Racing	6	2	5	2	2	186	6th
2019	Michelin Pilot Challenge - TCR	LA Honda World Racing	10	2	1	1	2	265	4th
2020	Gridlife Touring Cup	Independent	20	0	0	0	1	137	14th
2021	Gridlife Touring Cup	ASM	27	7	4	7	9	444	4th
2022	Gridlife Touring Cup	ASM	40	20	19	16	10	125	**1st**
2023	Gridlife Touring Cup	ASM	4	1	1	2	0	13	31st
2023	Michelin Pilot Challenge - TCR	Rockwell Autosport Development	1	0	0	0	0	180	35th
2024	Michelin Pilot Challenge - TCR	Rockwell Autosport Development	3	0	0	0	0	650	22nd

^{*} Season still in progress.

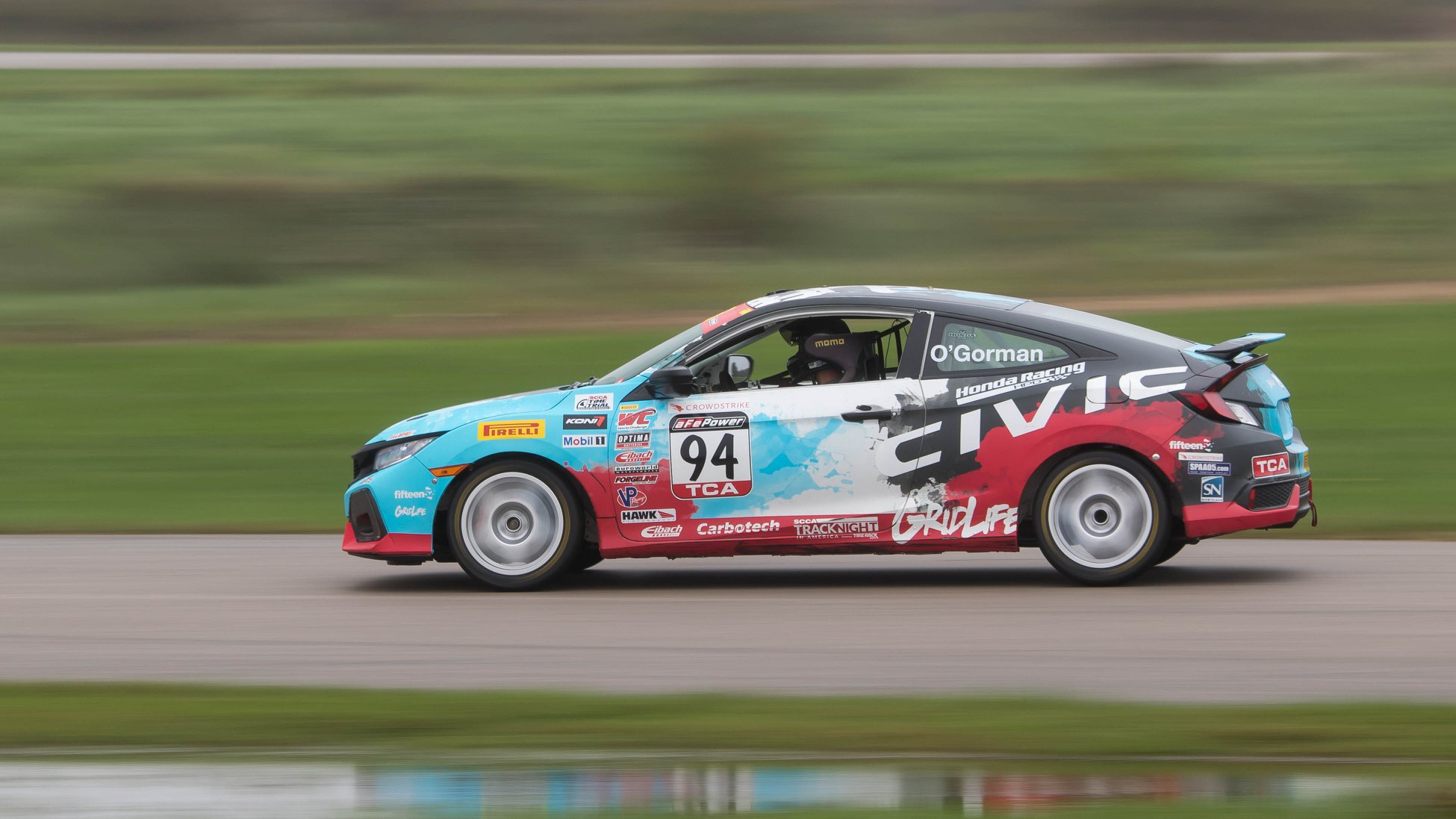
Tom O'Gorman in his #94 Honda Civic Si TCA racecar

=== Complete Pirelli World Challenge Championship Results ===
(key) (Races in Bold indicate pole position)(Italics indicate Fastest Lap)

Year	Team	Class	Car	1	2	3	4	5	6	7	8	9	10	11	12	13	14	15	16	17	18	Rank	Points
2015	TOMO Racing	TCB	Honda Fit										MOH 12	MOH 4	MOH 12				LAG 3	LAG 5	LAG 2	15th	479
2016	Black Armor Helmets	TCB	Honda Fit	AUS 2	AUS 2	MOS 2	MOS 2			**ELK** **1**	ELK 1	**UTA** **1**	UTA 1	LAG 2	LAG 2							1st	1188
2017	Shea Racing	TCA	Honda Civic Si	VIR 9	VIR 11	MOS 4	**MOS** **1**	LIM 10	LIM 3	UTA 6	UTA 3	AUS 5	AUS 4	LAG 3	LAG 2							3rd	215
2018	TOMO Racing	TCA	Honda Civic Si	AUS 2	AUS 1	**VIR** **1**	VIR 3	LIM 2	LIM 1	POR 2	POR 3	UTA 1	**UTA** **1**	**WGL** **NC**	WGL 4							1st	258

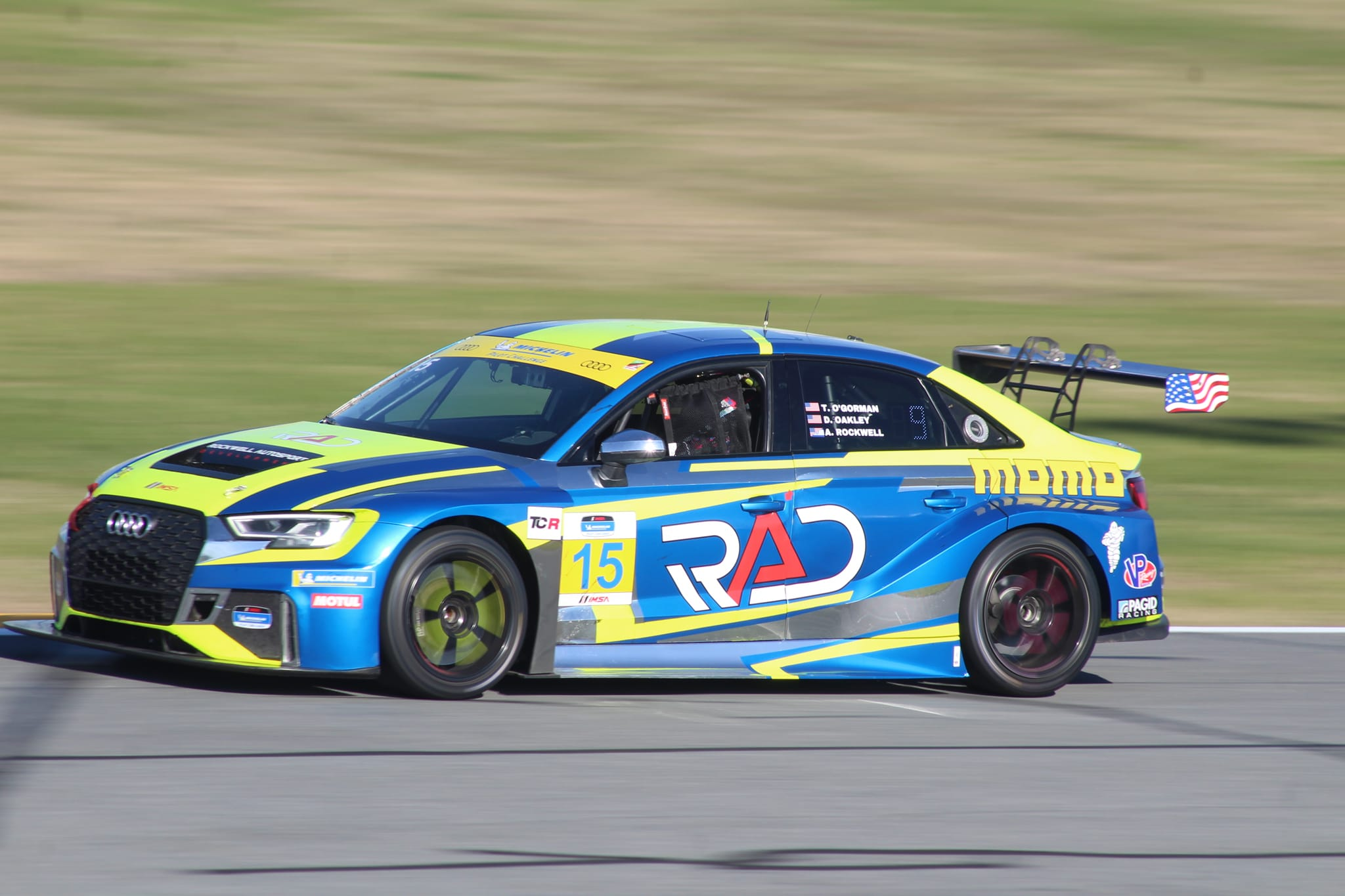
The #15 RAD Audi RS3 TCR at Daytona

Complete IMSA Continental Tire SportsCar Challenge & Michelin Pilot Challenge Championship Results

Year	Team	Class	Car	1	2	3	4	5	6	7	8	9	10	Rank	Points
2018	eEuroparts.com ROWE Racing	TCR	Audi RS 3 LMS TCR				WGL 4		**LIM** **2**	**ELK** **5**	**VIR** **1**	**LGA** **3**	**ATL** **1**	6th	186
2019	LA Honda World Racing	TCR	Honda Civic Type R TCR (FK8)	DAY 1	SEB 1	MOH 5	WGL 5	MOS 14	LIM 12	**ELK** **2**	VIR 6	LGA 3	ATL 11	4th	265
2023	Rockwell Autosport Development	TCR	Audi RS 3 LMS TCR	DAY 13										35th	180
2024	Rockwell Autosport Development	TCR	Audi RS 3 LMS TCR	DAY 4			MOH 13							15th*	460*

^{*} Season still in progress.

Sporting positions
Preceded by Johan Schwartz	Pirelli World Challenge TCB; Champion; 2016	Succeeded by P. J. Groenke
Preceded by Matt Fassnacht	Pirelli World Challenge TCA; Champion; 2018	Succeeded by Tyler Maxson
Preceded by Jeremy Swenson	Gridlife Touring Cup; Champion; 2022	Succeeded by Jeremy Swenson
