= Jack Baruth =

American bicycle motocross rider

- Born: November 7, 1971 (age 55) Brooklyn, NY, U.S.

Pirelli World Challenge career
- Debut season: 2018
- Current team: RTF Racing
- Car number: 31
- Best finish: 30th in 2018

Previous series
- 2009: KONI Challenge

Awards
- 2018: Best Start, Hard Charger

Jack Baruth (born November 8, 1971) is an automotive journalist and race car driver. He is a former professional BMX racer, cycling instructor, and cycling journalist, perhaps best known for writing the "One Racer's Perspective" and "BMX Basics" columns for the National Bicycle League, for his regular (and sometimes controversial) contributions to The Truth About Cars and for maintaining the now defunct BMX Basics website under his pen name Jim Boswell. As of 2013, Jack Baruth is now a contributor to Road and Track magazine. On July 12, 2013, he became the temporary editor-in-chief of The Truth About Cars.

As a car racer, he races in the Pirelli World Challenge, NASA, KONI Challenge, and Skip Barber Mazdaspeed Series.

Jack Baruth has been parodied on the satirical websites Autoblopnik and Sniff Petrol.

== Pirelli World Challenge ==
In the first Pirelli World Challenge start of 2018, The GP of Watkins Glen at Watkins Glen International, Jack Baruth, in the No. 31 RTF Racing Honda Accord Coupe, rocketed up to finish 14th after starting 20th on the day. Baruth was awarded the Optima Batteries Best Start Award for gaining four positions, and the VP Racing Fuels Hard Charger Award for gaining six positions in the race.

== Motorsports Career Results ==
(key)

=== Pirelli World Challenge results ===
Year	Team	Make	Engine	Class	1	2	3	4	5	6	7	8	9	10	11	12	13	14	15	16	17	18	19	20	Rank	Points
2018	RTF Racing	Honda	Accord Coupe	TC	STP1	STP2	COA1	COA2	LBH	VIR1	VIR2	MOS1	MOS2	LRP1	LRP2	ELK1	ELK2	POR1	POR2	UTA1	UTA2	WGI1; 14	WGI2		30th*	7*
