= Paul Holton =

American racing driver (born 1993)

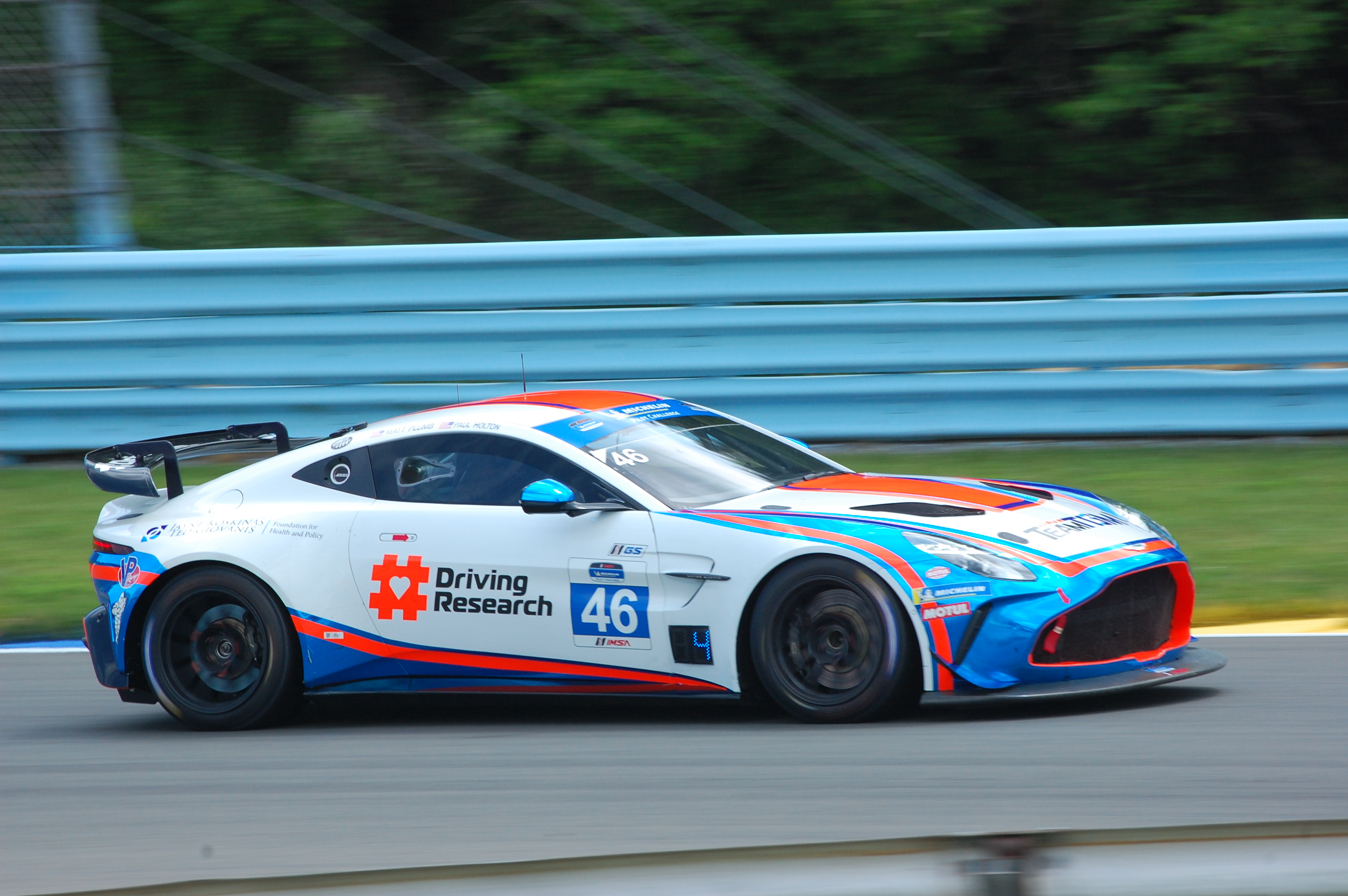
- Holton in 2025
- Nationality: (United States) American
- Born: October 11, 1993 (age 33) Tallahassee, Florida, U.S.
- Categorisation: FIA Silver (until 2020, 2027–); FIA Gold (2021–2026)

Championship titles
- 2017: Pirelli World Challenge – TC

Paul Holton (born 11 October 1993) is an American racing driver who last competed in the GS class of the Michelin Pilot Challenge for Team TGM. He was a McLaren factory driver from 2018 to 2022.

== Career ==
Holton made his car racing debut in 2014, racing in the TCB class of the Pirelli World Challenge for Shea Racing. Driving a Honda Fit in his first season in the series, Holton scored a lone win at Road America en route to a fourth-place points finish. Switching to Audi A3-fielding Compass360 Racing for 2015 to compete in the Continental Tire Sports Car Challenge, Holton scored a lone win at Road Atlanta as he ended the year 14th in the ST standings. During 2015, Holton also raced for the same team on a part-time basis in Pirelli World Challenge's TCA and GTS classes, in which he scored wins at Mosport and Laguna Seca in the former class.

Remaining with C360R to step up to the GS class for 2016, Holton scored a best result of second at Daytona and a pair of third-place finishes to end the year fourth in points driving a Ford Shelby GT350R-C. During 2016, Holton also raced all but one round of the Audi Sport TT Cup, scoring a best result of seventh at the Norisring. In 2017, Holton continued with C360R for a dual campaign in the GS class of the Continental Tire SportsCar Challenge and the TC class of the Pirelli World Challenge. Driving a McLaren 570 GT4 in the former, Holton scored a lone win at Circuit of the Americas and a podium at Watkins Glen to end the season fifth in points. Racing a Audi RS 3 LMS in the latter, Holton kicked off the season with wins at VIR and Mosport, before winning both races at Laguna Seca to clinch the TC title.

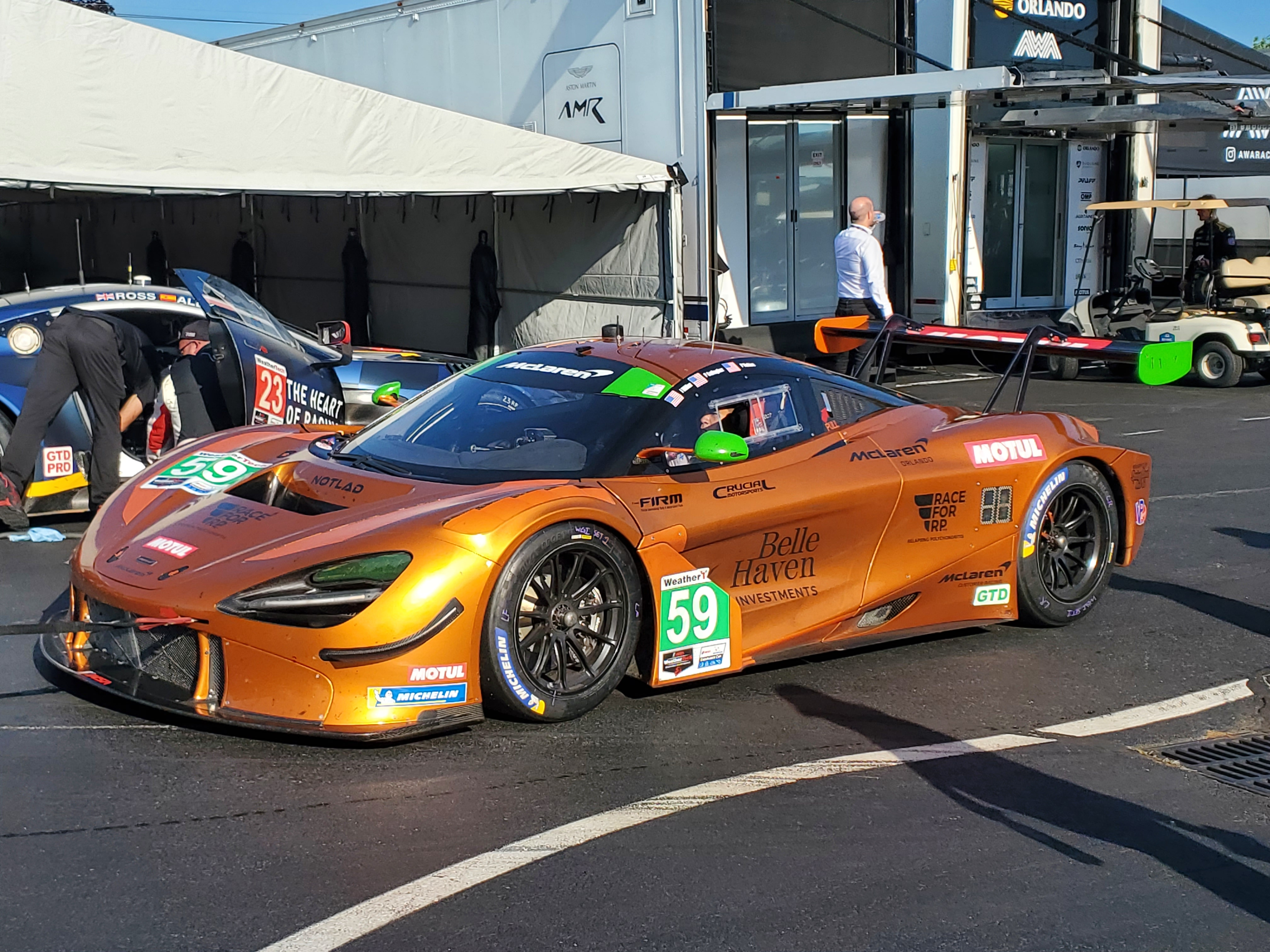
Holton's Crucial Motorsports McLaren at Watkins Glen in 2022.

Joining the McLaren factory roster for 2018, Holton remained with Compass Racing for a dual campaign in the GS class of the Continental Tire SportsCar Challenge and the GTS Pro-Am class of the SprintX GT Championship Series. Between the two campaigns, Holton found more success in the former, scoring a best result of second at Road Atlanta to end the year fifth in the GS standings. During 2018, Holton raced at the non-championship Long Beach of the Pirelli World Challenge, scoring a GTS class win. Continuing with Compass Racing for another season in the Michelin Pilot Challenge, Holton scored a lone win at Daytona and a podium at Road America to take 15th in the GS standings. During 2019, Holton also raced in the Sprint rounds of the IMSA SportsCar Championship in GTD for the same team. Another campaign in the Sprint rounds of the IMSA SportsCar Championship then ensued in 2020, before making one-off appearances in TCR South America and the Indianapolis 8 Hours in 2021 for KMW Motorsports and Crucial Motorsports, the latter of which he worked as team manager. In 2022, Holton continued with Crucial Motorsports to race in select rounds of the IMSA SportsCar Championship in GTD.

After a year as Crucial Motorsports' partnerships director, Holton joined Aston Martin-fielding Team TGM to race in the 2024 Michelin Pilot Challenge from Sebring onwards. In the nine races he contested, Holton scored a lone win at Watkins Glen and three other podiums en route to a third-place points finish in the GS points. Continuing with Team TGM for 2025, Holton scored a best result of fifth at Watkins Glen to end the season eighth in points. The following year, Holton remained with Team TGM, as they switched to a Ford Mustang, to remain in the Michelin Pilot Challenge, as well as joining Forte Racing to compete in McLaren Trophy America alongside Kaia Teo. With TGM, Holton got a best result of second at both Road America and Road Atlanta to take 23rd in the GS standings, whereas in the latter, he took a lone Pro win at Sonoma and five other podiums to take fourth in points.

== Racing record ==
=== Racing career summary ===
Season	Series	Team	Races	Wins	Poles	F/Laps	Podiums	Points	Position
2014	Pirelli World Challenge – TCB	Shea Racing	14	1	0	1	2	1053	4th
2014	Continental Tire Sports Car Challenge – ST	Rebel Rock Racing	1	0	0	0	0	11	74th
2015	Continental Tire Sports Car Challenge – ST	Compass360 Racing	10	1	0	0	1	174	14th
2015	Pirelli World Challenge – TCA	Compass360 Racing	7	2	1	3	3	834	7th
2015	Pirelli World Challenge – GTS	Compass360 Racing	3	0	0	0	0	107	28th
2016	Continental Tire SportsCar Challenge – GS	C360R	10	0	0	1	3	247	4th
2016	Audi Sport TT Cup	N/A	12	0	0	0	0	70	14th
2017	Continental Tire SportsCar Challenge – GS	C360R	10	1	4	2	3	239	5th
2017	Pirelli World Challenge – TC	C360R	12	4	8	7	7	235	**1st**
2017	SCCA National Runoffs – Mazda Miata		1	0	0	0	0	—N/a	11th
2018	Continental Tire SportsCar Challenge – GS	Compass Racing	9	0	3	2	1	239	5th
2018	SprintX GT Championship Series – GTS Pro-Am	Compass Racing	9	0	0	0	0	39	27th
2019	Michelin Pilot Challenge – GS	Compass Racing	8	1	0	0	2	154	15th
2019	IMSA SportsCar Championship – GTD	Compass Racing	7	0	0	0	0	122	17th
2020	IMSA SportsCar Championship – GTD	Compass Racing	7	0	2	0	0	125	20th
2021	TCR South America Touring Car Championship	KMW Motorsports with PropCar	2	0	0	0	1	34	230th
2021	Indianapolis 8 Hours – GT3 Pro	Crucial Motorsports	1	0	0	0	0	—N/a	DNF
2022	IMSA SportsCar Championship – GTD	Crucial Motorsports	3	0	0	0	0	524	40th
2024	Michelin Pilot Challenge – GS	Team TGM	9	1	1	0	4	2470	**3rd**
2025	Michelin Pilot Challenge – GS	Team TGM	10	0	1	0	0	2130	8th
2026	Michelin Pilot Challenge – GS	Team TGM	10	0	0	0	2	1390	23rd
2026	McLaren Trophy America – Pro	Forte Racing	9	1	2	0	6	67	4th

^{†} As Holton was a guest driver, he was ineligible to score points.

=== Complete Michelin Pilot Challenge results ===
(key) (Races in bold indicate pole position) (Races in italics indicate fastest lap)

Year	Entrant	Class	Make	1	2	3	4	5	6	7	8	9	10	11	12	Rank	Points
2014	Rebel Rock Racing	Street Tuner	Porsche Cayman	DAY	SEB	LGA	LIM	KAN	WGL	MOS	IMS	ELK; 20	VIR	COA	ATL	74th	11
2015	Compass360 Racing	Street Tuner	Honda Civic Si	DAY; 7												14th	174
2015	Compass360 Racing	Street Tuner	Audi S3		SEB; 29	LGA; 15	WGL; 16	MOS; 17	LIM; 17	ELK; 14	VIR; 13	COA; 13	ATL; 1			14th	174
2016	C360R	Grand Sport	Ford Shelby GT350R-C	DAY; 2	SEB; 4	LGA; 6	WGL; 6	MOS; 3	LIM; 7	ELK; 8†	VIR; 6	COA; 3	ATL; 4			4th	274
2017	C360R	Grand Sport	McLaren 570S GT4	DAY; 16	SEB; 5	**COA**; 1	**WGL**; 3	MOS; 4	LIM; 6	**ELK**; 13	VIR; 8	LGA; 14	**ATL**; 13			5th	239
2018	Compass Racing	Grand Sport	McLaren 570S GT4	DAY; 14	SEB; 7	MOH; 23	WGL; 18	MOS; 11	LIM; 4	**ELK**; 18	**VIR**; 4	LGA	**ATL**; 2			5th	225
2019	Compass Racing	Grand Sport	McLaren 570S GT4	DAY; 1	SEB; 23	MOH; 22	WGL; 17	MOS	LIM	ELK; 2	VIR; 9	LGA; 22	ATL; 6			15th	154
2024	Team TGM	Grand Sport	Aston Martin Vantage AMR GT4 Evo	DAY	SEB; 4	LGA; 6	MOH; 2	WGL; 1	MOS; 3	ELK; 11	VIR; 14	IMS; 4	**ATL**; 2			3rd	2470
2025	Team TGM	Grand Sport	Aston Martin Vantage AMR GT4 Evo	DAY; 23	**SEB**; 6	LGA; 8	MOH; 11	WGL; 5	MOS; 10	ELK; 8	VIR; 6	IMS; 11	ATL; 9			8th	2130
2026	Team TGM	Grand Sport	Ford Mustang GT4 (2024)	DAY; 12	SEB; 20	LGA; 29	MOH; 29	WGL; 25	MOS; 5	ELK; 2	VIR; 23	IMS; 30	ATL; 2			23rd	1390

=== Complete WeatherTech SportsCar Championship results ===
(key) (Races in bold indicate pole position; results in italics indicate fastest lap)

Year	Team	Class	Make	Engine	1	2	3	4	5	6	7	8	9	10	11	12	Pos.	Points
2019	Compass Racing	GTD	McLaren 720S GT3	McLaren M840T 4.0L Turbo V8	DAY	SEB	MOH; 13	DET; 8	WGL	MOS; 10	LIM; 10	ELK; 12	VIR; 9	LGA; 10	PET		17th	122
2020	Compass Racing	GTD	McLaren 720S GT3	McLaren M840T 4.0L Turbo V8	DAY	**DAY**; 11	SEB; 6	ELK; 9	**VIR**; 11	ATL	MOH; 8	CLT; 9	PET	LGA; 13	SEB		20th	125
2022	Crucial Motorsports	GTD	McLaren 720S GT3	McLaren M840T 4.0L Turbo V8	DAY; 19	SEB; 14	LBH; 13	LGA	MOH	DET	WGL; 15	MOS	LIM	ELK	VIR	PET	40th	524
