= BimmerWorld Racing =

Car racing team in Virginia, United States

(United States) BimmerWorld Racing
- Founded: 1997
- Founder(s): James Clay
- Base: Pulaski County, Virginia, USA
- Current series: GT4 America Series
- Former series: Blancpain GT World Challenge America; ChampCar Endurance Series; Michelin Pilot Challenge; Pikes Peak International Hill Climb; SCCA World Challenge; VLN
- Current drivers: (United States) James Clay (United States) Tyler McQuarrie (United States) Michael Petramalo (United States) James Walker Jr.
- Website: www.bimmerworldracing.com

BimmerWorld Racing is a sports car racing team and supplier of racing, performance, and replacement parts based in Pulaski, Virginia, USA. The company focuses on the BMW brand of automobiles with a strong emphasis on road racing. The team first began racing professionally in the sprint-format SCCA World Challenge series before switching to the endurance-based IMSA/Grand-Am Sports Car Challenge. The team has also diversified into other forms of motorsport including NASA, BMW CCA Club Racing, SCCA, SpecE30, The One Lap of America, Pikes Peak International Hill Climb, ChampCar, VLN, and PowerWheels Attack. The team and parts company is independently owned by founder James Clay.

As a BMW specialist the team's race cars consist of BMW automobiles. Some of the cars the team has used over the years include: E36 325i/328i, E36 M3, E46 325i, E46 330i, E46 M3, E90 325i/328i, E92 335i, E92 M3, F30 328i, F22 M235i Racing, and F82 M4 GT4. The team won the 2018 Street Tuner Drivers Championship with Devin Jones and Nick Galante driving a F30 328i. In 2019 the team runs two pro-racing efforts: a pair of M4 GT4 cars for the IMSA Michelin Pilot Challenge and two M240i Racing models in the Blancpain World Challenge Touring Car series. Drivers are James Clay, Devin Jones, Cameron Evans, Chandler Hull, Aurora Straus, Kaz Grala, Seth Thomas, and Ari Balogh. The cars are sponsored by Optima Batteries, Veristor, CoPart, Red Line Oil, Eibach Springs, Performance Friction Brakes, MagnaFlow Exhaust, and BMW of North America. The team also runs the livery of The Race to End Alzheimer's, a charity raising money and awareness for Alzheimer's disease. In addition to their pro racing efforts, the team builds BMWs race cars for customers on a regular basis.
