= Aurora Straus =

American professional racecar driver

Aurora Straus is a 27-year-old professional racecar driver in the US, a consultant, and a folk musician. She currently competes in the IMSA Continental Tire Sportscar Challenge, and previously raced in the Battery Tender Mazda MX-5 Cup. She lives in Cold Spring, NY, and (Feb 2019) attended Harvard University for her undergraduate degree. She, when 19 years of age, was the only professional teenage female sportscar racer in North America. She now works as a consultant in the New York City area.

== Personal life ==
Straus is the daughter of Molly McCoy and Ari Straus, the chief executive officer of the Monticello Motor Club. She graduated from Hackley School's Class of 2017 and then attended Harvard (Class of 2022) as a double major in English literature and mechanical engineering. Straus took a gap year to work at ZappRx, a digital health company that focuses on management of specialty medications. She was a National Merit Finalist, representing less than 1% of high school seniors in the United States. Straus is also an avid musician that plays frequently in local venues in Cold Spring and Tarrytown, NY. She sang at a Holiday Charity Music Fest in December 2015 that benefited Hope's Door, a safe haven for domestic abuse survivors in Pleasantville, NY.

== Racing career ==
As a 13-year-old with no prior karting experience, Straus got behind the wheel of a Mazda Miata under the tutelage of Stevan McAleer, the 2015 Continental Tire Sportscar Challenge Champion. She raced in several Intercontinental Trophy Cup and Skip Barber Cup races before spending two seasons in semi-professional racing in the Battery Tender Mazda MX-5 Cup. After the 2015 and 2016 seasons, she made her Continental Tire Sportscar Challenge debut at Watkins Glen in July 2016, during which she piloted her Cayman from 24th to 9th place before handing her car over to her codriver, Justin Piscitell. For the 2017 season, she raced in the Continental Tire Sportscar Challenge full-time on the Rennsport-One Team with co-driver Connor Bloum.

== Media ==
Straus was featured in the Mazda commercial "The Driver in All of Us," shown in theaters across the US. At 14 years old, Gearhead Girls covered Aurora as part of their focus on female talent. She was invited to the Inaugural Mazda Global Invitational as one of ten competitors from the US.
