= Scuderia Corsa =

Racing team

(United States) Scuderia Corsa
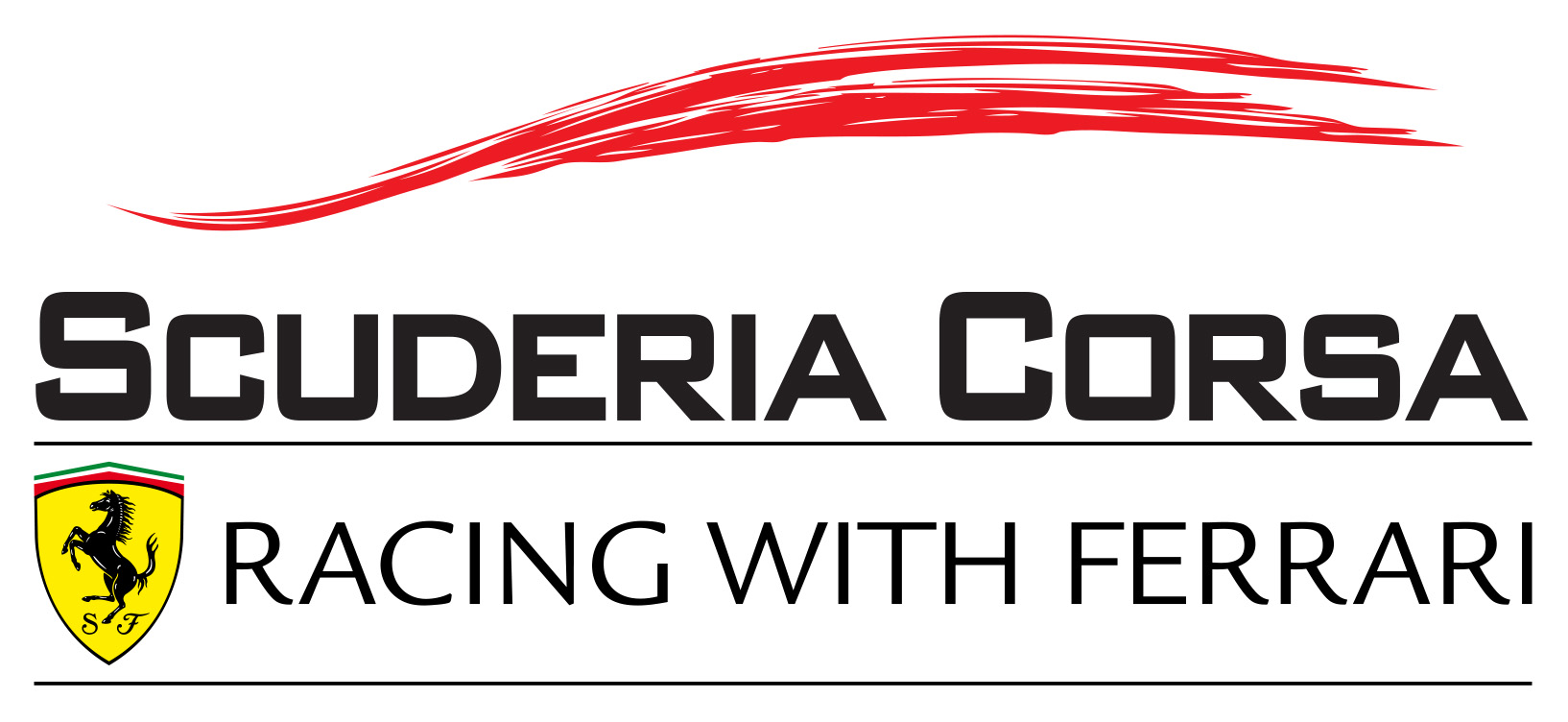
- Founded: 2012
- Nation: United States of America
- Founder(s): Giacomo Mattioli, Art Zafiropoulo
- Base: 7925 W Arby Ave Ste 100, Las Vegas, Nevada 89113
- Team principal(s): Roberto Amorosi
- Current series: Ferrari Challenge North America
- Former series: IndyCar Series; IMSA SportsCar Championship; Pirelli World Challenge; Grand-Am; Rolex Sports Car Series
- Teams' Championships: Rolex Sports Car Series: 2013; IMSA SportsCar Championship: 2015, 2016, 2017; Pirelli World Challenge: 2016
- Drivers' Championships: Rolex Sports Car Series: 2013; IMSA SportsCar Championship: 2015, 2016, 2017; Michelin Endurance Cup: 2016; Pirelli World Challenge: 2016; Ferrari Challenge North America Coppa Shell: 2014, 2017; Ferrari Challenge North America Trofeo Pirelli: 2011, 2021, 2022, 2023; Ferrari Challenge North America Coppa Ladies: 2022
- Website: www.scuderiacorsa.com

Scuderia Corsa is an American automotive racing team based in Las Vegas competing in the IMSA SportsCar Championship, Pirelli World Challenge and Ferrari Challenge in North America.

Founded in 2012 by Giacomo Mattioli and Art Zafiropoulo, the team has the main purpose of supporting the racing needs of Ferrari clients, starting from customizable track-day events to the Ferrari Challenge Series to the GT endurance racing such as the 24 Hours of Le Mans. Scuderia Corsa is the racing arm of Mattioli Automotive Group, inclusive of Ferrari Beverly Hills and Ferrari Westlake. In 2022 Giacomo Mattioli acquired Art Zafiropoulo shares becoming the sole owner of the racing team.

== History ==
=== IMSA Championship ===
In 2012, Scuderia Corsa started competing at the Grand-Am Rolex Sports Car Series at Mazda Raceway Laguna Seca in the No. 63 Ferrari 458 Italia securing pole position in its very first appearance with Alessandro Balzan. The second and final race of the season for Scuderia Corsa in 2012 was at Lime Rock Park with Alessandro Balzan and Johannes van Overbeek helping Ferrari win the GT manufacturer title.

In 2013, Scuderia Corsa campaigned the No. 63 Ferrari 458 Italia GT for the entire season in the GT Class, with starting drivers line-up consisting of Alessandro Balzan and Jeff Westphal. Scuderia Corsa won the GT Team and Driver Championship and helped Ferrari earn the manufacturer championship for the second year in a row at Lime Rock; a race that ended with a double podium (P2 and P3) for the No. 63 and No. 64. That season, Scuderia Corsa earned 6 podiums and one win, at Kansas Speedway.

In 2014, Scuderia Corsa continued to run the No. 63 Ferrari 458 Italia in the GT-Daytona class clinching wins at the Brickyard Grand Prix and the Detroit Grand Prix and securing three podiums, achieving a top-ten finish in the GT-Daytona standings.

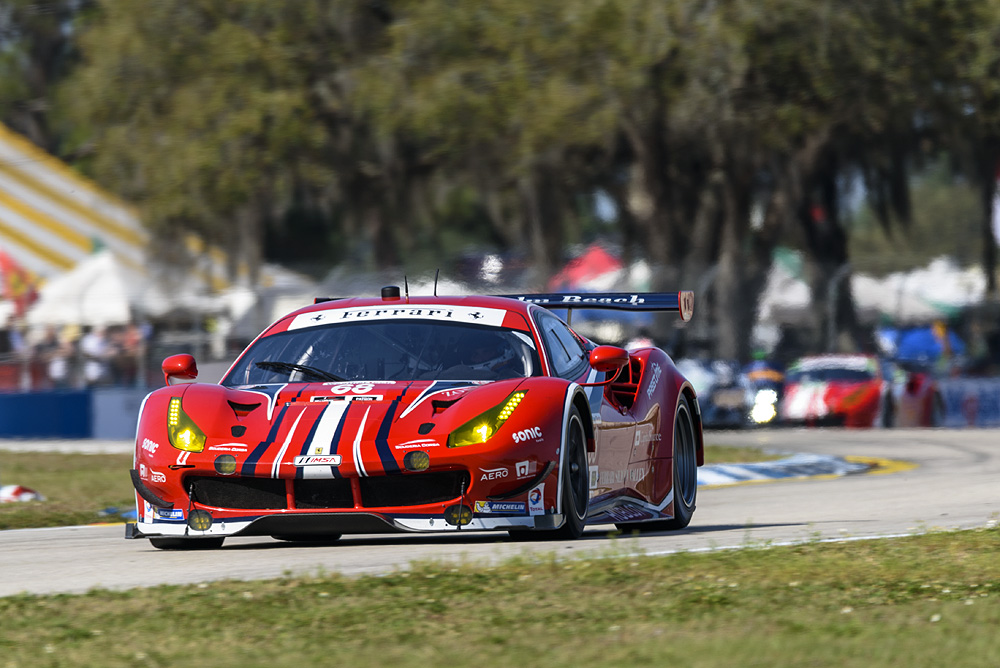
Scuderia Corsa no. 68 Ferrari 488 GTE at the 12 Hours of Sebring in 2016

In 2015, Scuderia Corsa won its second IMSA Championship in the GT-Daytona class with drivers Townsend Bell and Bill Sweedler, also securing the Manufacturer Championship and North American Endurance Cup Manufacturers Championship. Scuderia Corsa also won at Virginia International Raceway.

In 2016, Scuderia Corsa won its third IMSA Championship title in four years with the No. 63 Ferrari 488 GT3, achieving Team and Drivers Championship Titles and the North American Endurance Cup Drivers Title in the GT-Daytona class. The team raced to victory at the 12 Hours of Sebring and 6 Hours of Watkins Glen with drivers Christina Nielsen, Alessandro Balzan and Jeff Segal.

In 2016, Scuderia Corsa also raced the No. 68 in the North American Endurance Cup in the GT-Le Mans class with drivers Alessandro Pier Guidi and Daniel Serra, achieving pole and second place at Laguna Seca and a top-ten finish in the standings.

In 2017, Scuderia Corsa won its fourth championship in five years with the WeatherTech Sports Card Team, winning the Drivers, and Manufacturers Championship. They were also the very first team to win a full-season sports-car championship title in North America with a female driver.

To celebrate this achievement LEGO has created a set part of the "Speed Champion" line. This set itself was launched in 2018 at Sebring International Raceway, in combination with Scuderia Corsa who also had a 1:8 scale 488 build alongside it to show off.

=== 24 Hours of Le Mans ===
In 2015, Scuderia Corsa debuted in the 24 Hours of Le Mans entering the No. 62 Ferrari in the GTE-Am class with drivers Townsend Bell, Bill Sweedler and Jeff Segal, who finished in third place.

In 2016, Scuderia Corsa re-entered the No. 62 Ferrari at the 24 Hours of Le Mans driven again by the all-American lineup of Townsend Bell, Bill Sweedler and Jeff Segal, which won the GTE-Am class in their second time entry at Le Mans.

In 2017, Scuderia Corsa re-entered again the No. 62 Ferrari at the 24 Hours of Le Mans driven again by the all-American lineup of Townsend Bell, Bill Sweedler and the addition of Cooper MacNeil. The team also entered a second entry driven by Alessandro Balzan, Christina Nielsen and Bret Curtis.

=== Pirelli World Challenge ===
Scuderia Corsa made its debut in the Pirelli World Challenge for the 2015 season with driver Martin Fuentes in the No. 07 Hublot Ferrari 458 Italia, Duncan Ende in the No. 64 and Mike Hedlund in the No. 65. The team scored one win and 4 podiums during the season.

In 2016, Scuderia Corsa fielded the No. 07 with driver Martin Fuentes and won the Championship in the GT-A Class. With the team's ninth consecutive win during the season, Scuderia Corsa and Fuentes set a new Pirelli World Challenge record for victories in a season across all of the non-spec classes. The team scored 9 wins and 7 additional podiums during the entire season, and also earned the Special GT Crew Award of the Year, a special recognition voted by all teams in the paddock.

=== Ferrari Challenge ===
Scuderia Corsa placed 3rd in the Ferrari Challenge North America for the 2010 season.

In 2011, the team achieved 1st and 2nd place in the Ferrari Challenge North America Championship with the Ferrari Challenge F430.

In 2014, Scuderia Corsa won the Ferrari Challenge North America Championship with the Ferrari 458 Challenge Evo in the Coppa Shell class. The team also placed 3rd at the Ferrari World Finals, with a total of 10 victories and 22 podiums throughout the season.

In 2016 Scuderia Corsa scored 13 podiums in the North America Championship including 2nd in the Championships in North America and 2nd in the World Finals.

In 2017, Scuderia Corsa ran the largest Ferrari Challenge team in the world with 15 drivers. They won the North America Coppa Shell Championship.

Scuderia Corsa also initiated the Drivers Development Program, which provides a complete solution for drivers to looking to get on the racetrack for the first time. This program prepares early-stage drivers for participation in the Ferrari Challenge Esperienza Program, providing drivers with valuable track time and feedback from the team's engineering team and driver coaches.

In 2023, Scuderia Corsa won for the 3rd time in a row, the Ferrari Challenge Trofeo Pirelli division with Matt Kurzejewski in his second year with the team.

As of the 2026 season, Scuderia Corsa — the racing arm of Ferrari Beverly Hills — still competes in the Ferrari Challenge North America series, a single-make racing championship for Ferrari cars organized by Ferrari North America and sanctioned by IMSA. The team supports client drivers competing in the series.

=== Indycar ===
In 2018, Scuderia Corsa entered the Indianapolis 500 for the first time with veteran Indycar driver Oriol Servia in a Honda-powered effort fielded in conjunction with Rahal Letterman Lanigan Racing.

== Racing Record ==
Ferrari Challenge North America

Year	Class	Car	Driver	Rank
2021	Trofeo Pirelli North America	Ferrari 488 Challenge Evo	Cooper MacNeil	1st
2022	Trofeo Pirelli North America	Ferrari 488 Challenge Evo	Jeremy Clarke	1st
2022	Coppa Shell-Am North America	Ferrari 488 Challenge Evo	Lisa Clark	2nd
2022	Coppa Ladies	Ferrari 488 Challenge Evo	Lisa Clark	1st
2023	Trofeo Pirelli North America	Ferrari 488 Challenge Evo	Matt Kurzejewski	1st

=== IMSA SportsCar Championship series results ===
Year	Team	No	Class	Make	Engine	1	2	3	4	5	6	7	8	9	10	11	12	Rank	Points
2015	Scuderia Corsa	63	GTD	Ferrari 458 Italia	Ferrari	DAY; 6	SEB; 3	LBH	LS; 4	DET; 9	S6H; 4	MSP	CON; 9	ELK; 4	VIR; 1	AUS; 6	PET; 4	1st	279
2016	Scuderia Corsa	63	GTD	Ferrari 488 GT3	Ferrari	DAY; 6	SEB; 1	LBH	LS; 2	DET; 3	S6H; 1	MSP; 4	CON; 11	ELK; 3	VIR; 7	AUS; 3	PET; 2	1st	332
2016	Scuderia Corsa	68	GTLM	Ferrari 488 GTE	Ferrari	DAY; 4	SEB; 7	LBH; 6	LS; 2	DET	S6H; 5	MSP	CON	ELK	VIR	AUS	PET; 8	10th	164
2017	Scuderia Corsa	63	GTD	Ferrari 488 GT3	Ferrari	DAY; 16	SIR; 2	LBH; 2	AUS; 3	DET; 3	S6H; 2	MSP; 3	CON; 6	ELK; 5	VIR; 4	LS; 1	PET; 9	1st	340

=== 24 Hours of Le Mans results ===
Year	Entrant	No	Car	Drivers	Class	Laps	Pos.	Class Pos.
2015	(United States) Scuderia Corsa	62	Ferrari 458 Italia GT2	(United States) Townsend Bell (United States) Jeff Segal (United States) Bill Sweedler	GTE Am	330	24th	3rd
2016	(United States) Scuderia Corsa	62	Ferrari 458 Italia GT2	(United States) Townsend Bell (United States) Jeff Segal (United States) Bill Sweedler	GTE Am	331	26th	1st
2017	(United States) Scuderia Corsa	62	Ferrari 488 GTE	(United States) Townsend Bell (United States) Cooper MacNeil (United States) Bill Sweedler	GTE Am	331	29th	3rd
2017	(United States) Scuderia Corsa	65	Ferrari 488 GTE	(Italy) Alessandro Balzan (United States) Bret Curtis (Denmark) Christina Nielsen	GTE Am	314	44th	14th
2019	(United States) WeatherTech Racing	62	Ferrari 488 GTE	(United States) Cooper MacNeil (United Kingdom) Robert Smith (Finland) Toni Vilander	GTE Am	333	33rd	3rd
2020	(United States) WeatherTech Racing	63	Ferrari 488 GTE	(United States) Cooper MacNeil (United States) Jeff Segal (Finland) Toni Vilander	GTE Pro	185	DNF	DNF

=== IndyCar Series ===
(key)

Year	Chassis	Engine	Drivers	No.	1	2	3	4	5	6	7	8	9	10	11	12	13	14	15	16	17	Pos.	Pts.
Scuderia Corsa with Rahal Letterman Lanigan Racing
2018					STP	PHX	LBH	ALA	IMS	INDY	DET	DET	TEX	ROA	IOW	TOR	MDO	POC	GAT	POR	SNM		
2018	Dallara DW12	Honda HI18TT V6t	(Spain) Oriol Servià	64						17												35th	27
Ed Carpenter Racing with Scuderia Corsa
2019					STP	COA	ALA	LBH	IMS	INDY	DET	DET	TEX	ROA	TOR	IOW	MDO	POC	GAT	POR	LAG		
2019	Dallara DW12	Honda HI19TT V6t	(United Arab Emirates) Ed Jones	20	21	14	19	16	6		20	14		22	12		13			14	23	20th	217
2019	Dallara DW12	Honda HI19TT V6t	(United Arab Emirates) Ed Jones	63						17												20th	217
