= Christina Nielsen =

Danish racing driver

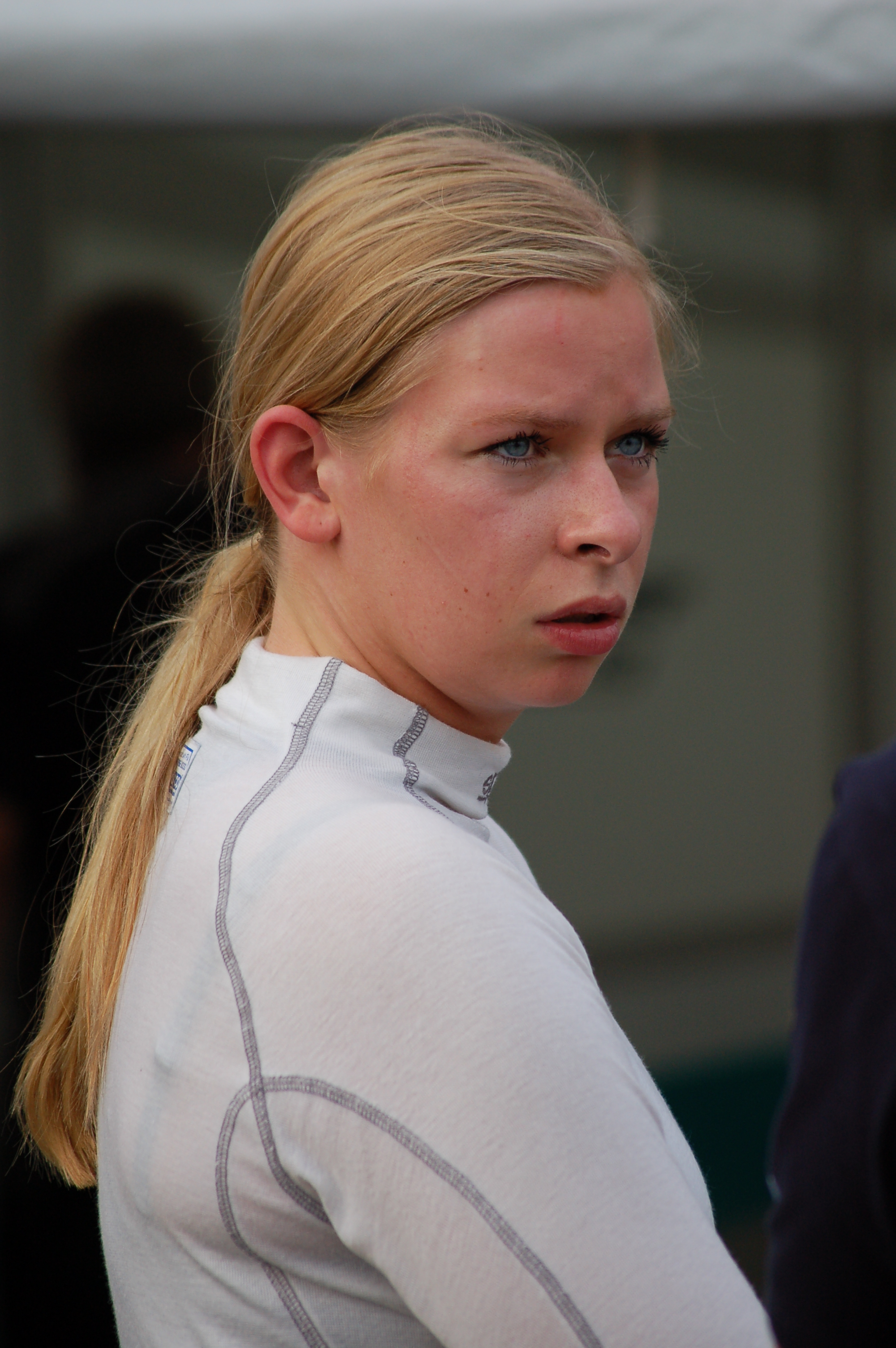
- Nielsen in 2012
- Nationality: (Denmark) Danish
- Born: 10 January 1992 (age 34) Hørsholm, Denmark
- Relatives: Lars-Erik Nielsen (father)

WeatherTech SportsCar Championship career
- Debut season: 2014
- Current team: Team Hardpoint EBM
- Categorisation: FIA Silver (until 2021); FIA Bronze (2022–)
- Car number: 88
- Former teams: Scuderia Corsa TRG-AMR North America; NGT Motorsport; Wright Motorsport, Grasser Racing Team
- Starts: 58
- Championships: 2 (2016, 2017)
- Wins: 4
- Poles: 3
- Best finish: 1st in 2016, 2017

Previous series
- 2015 2014 2012-2014 2013 2012 2010-2011 2010 2007-2009: Pirelli World Challenge; Porsche GT3 Cup Challenge USA; Porsche GT3 Cup Middle East; ADAC GT Masters; Porsche Carrera Cup Germany; ADAC Formel Masters; Formula Ford Denmark; Karting

Championship titles
- 2016-2017: WeatherTech SportsCar Championship GTD

Christina Nielsen (born 10 January 1992) is a Danish racing driver who is the first female driver to win a WeatherTech SportsCar Championship series title. She is the daughter of racing driver Lars-Erik Nielsen, who raced in the 24 Hours of Le Mans in the 2000s.

== Racing career ==
=== Karting ===
Nielsen started her karting career in 2007. After karting for a couple of years, she switched to formula racing in 2010.

=== Formel Ford Denmark & ADAC Formel Masters ===
After karting from 2007 to 2009, Nielsen made her formula racing debut in 2010 in the Danish Formula Ford Championship. She finished the season in ninth position.

After doing two one-off appearances in the ADAC Formel Masters in 2010, Nielsen went on to do a full season in 2011.

=== GT Racing ===
For 2012, Nielsen switched to the Porsche Carrera Cup Germany running in the B-class. She ended the season fifth in class.

In 2013, Nielsen switched to the ADAC GT Masters. For 2014, Nielsen raced in the United SportsCar Championship for NGT Motorsport.

In 2015, Nielsen ran the entire IMSA SportsCar Championship in a GTD Aston Martin Vantage V12 under the TRG-AMR banner, partnering with Kuno Wittmer and James Davison. She claimed four second-place finishes and a third, finishing runner-up two points behind Townsend Bell and Bill Sweedler.

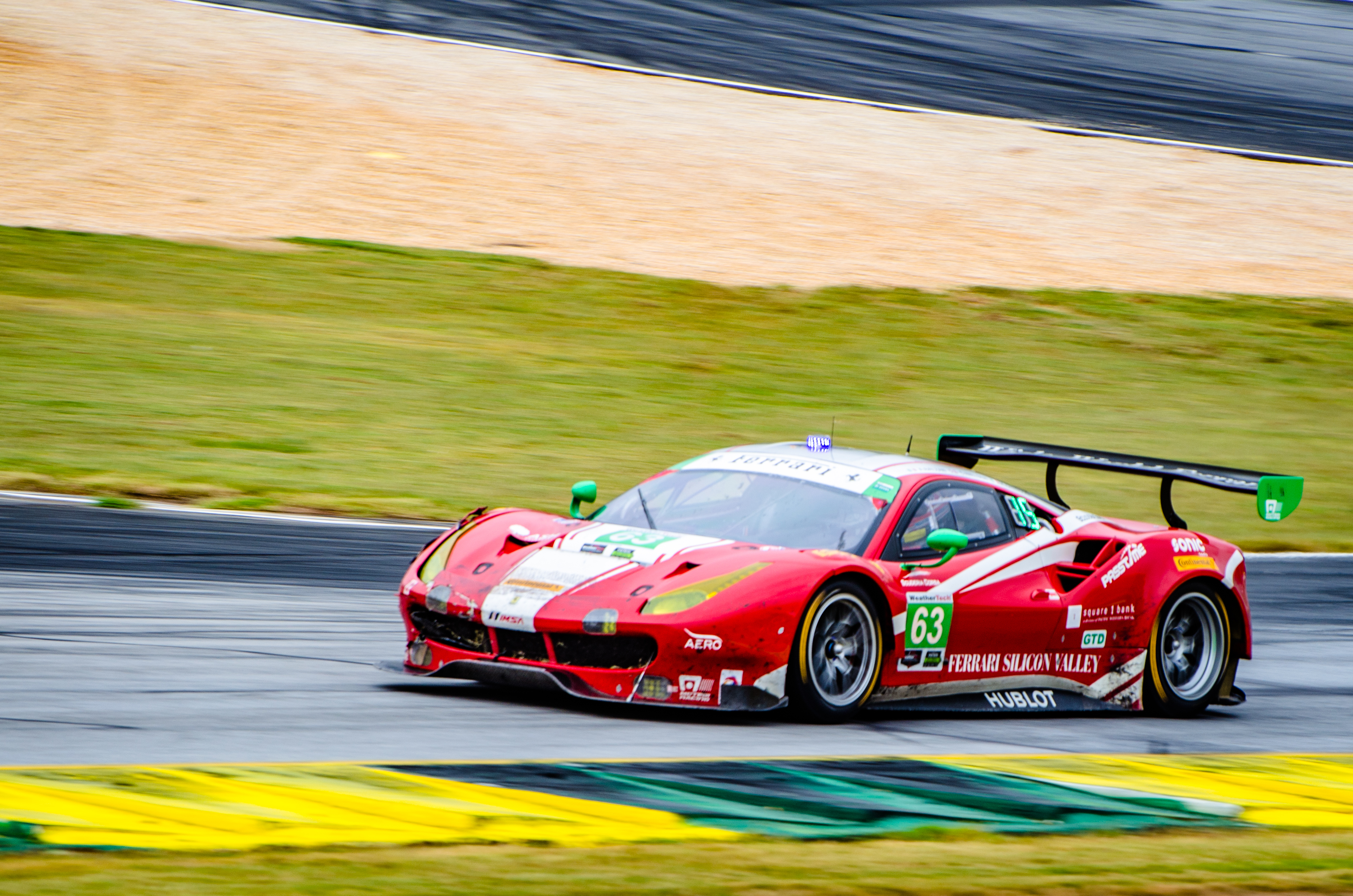
The 488 GT3 that Nielsen drove at the 2017 Petit Le Mans.

Nielsen continued in the IMSA SportsCar Championship in 2016, joining Scuderia Corsa to drive alongside Alessandro Balzan in a GTD-class Ferrari. She won the 12 Hours of Sebring with Jeff Segal as third driver. With another win at 6 Hours of Watkins Glen and four additional podiums throughout the season, Nielsen and Balzan won the 2016 IMSA SportsCar series Championship, with a 299-point total for the year, and thus Nielsen became the first woman to win a major full-season professional sports car championship in North America.

== Racing record ==
=== IMSA WeatherTech SportsCar Championship series results ===
Year	Team	Class	Make	Engine	1	2	3	4	5	6	7	8	9	10	11	12	Rank	Points	Ref
2014	NGT Motorsport	GTD	Porsche 911 GT America	Porsche 4.0 L Flat-6	DAY; 9	SEB; 22	LGA	DET	WGL; 6	MOS	IMS	ELK	VIR	COA			34th	73	
2014	TRG-AMR North America	GTD	Aston Martin Vantage GT3	Aston Martin 6.0 L V12											**PET**; 10		34th	73	
2015	TRG-AMR North America	GTD	Aston Martin Vantage GT3	Aston Martin 6.0 L V12	DAY; 13	SEB; 2	LGA; 5	BEL; 2	WGL; 10	LIM; 3	ELK; 2	VIR; 2	AUS; 8	PET; 9			2nd	279	
2016	Scuderia Corsa	GTD	Ferrari 488 GT3	Ferrari F154CB 3.9 L Turbo V8	DAY; 6	SEB; 1	LGA; 2	BEL; 3	WGL; 1	MOS; 4	LIM; 11	ELK; 3	VIR; 7	AUS; 3	PET; 2		1st	332	
2017	Scuderia Corsa	GTD	Ferrari 488 GT3	Ferrari F154CB 3.9 L Turbo V8	DAY; 16	SEB; 2	LBH; 3	AUS; 2	DET; 2	WGL; 2	MOS; 3	LIM; 6	ELK; 5	VIR; 12	LGA; 1	PET; 9	1st	340	
2018	Wright Motorsports	GTD	Porsche 911 GT3 R	Porsche 4.0 L Flat-6	DAY; 19	SEB; 6	MOH; 7	BEL; 11	WGL; 9	MOS; 9	**LIM**; 8	**ELK**; 1	VIR; 2	LGA; 11	PET; 4		7th	263	
2019	Heinricher Racing with Meyer Shank Racing	GTD	Acura NSX GT3	Acura 3.5 L Turbo V6	DAY; 12	SEB; 8	MDO; 10	DET; 9	WGL; 4	MOS	LIM; 12	ELK	VIR	LGA; 6	PET; 7		14th	159	
2020	GEAR Racing powered by GRT Grasser	GTD	Lamborghini Huracán GT3 Evo	Lamborghini 5.2 L V10	DAY; 16	DAY	SEB	ELK	VIR	ATL	MDO	CLT	PET	LGA	SEB		57th	15	
2021	Team Hardpoint EBM	GTD	Porsche 911 GT3 R	Porsche 4.0 L Flat-6	DAY; 10	SEB; 5	MDO	DET	WGL	WGL	LIM	ELK	LGA	LBH	VIR	PET	40th	508	

=== 24 Hours of Le Mans results ===
Year	Team	Co-Drivers	Car	Class	Laps	Pos.	Class Pos.
2016	(Denmark) Formula Racing	(Denmark) Johnny Laursen (Denmark) Mikkel Mac	Ferrari 458 Italia GTC	GTE; Am	319	35th	6th
2017	(United States) Scuderia Corsa	(Italy) Alessandro Balzan (United States) Bret Curtis	Ferrari 488 GTE	GTE; Am	314	44th	14th
2018	(Italy) Ebimotors	(Italy) Fabio Babini (France) Erik Maris	Porsche 911 RSR	GTE; Am	332	31st	6th

=== Complete 24 Hours of Nürburgring results ===
Year	Team	Co-Drivers	Car	Class	Laps	Ovr. Pos.	Class Pos.
2021	(Germany) WS Racing	(United Kingdom) Pippa Mann (France) Célia Martin (Germany) Carrie Schreiner	Audi R8 LMS GT4 Evo	SP8	52	45th	**1st**

=== Complete FIA World Endurance Championship results ===
(key) (Races in bold indicate pole position) (Races in italics indicate fastest lap)

Year	Entrant	Class	Car	Engine	1	2	3	4	5	6	Rank	Points
2022	Iron Dames	LMGTE Am	Ferrari 488 GTE Evo	Ferrari F154CB 3.9 L Turbo V8	SEB	SPA; 10	LMS	MNZ	FUJ	BHR	27th	1

Sporting positions
Preceded by Townsend Bell; Bill Sweedler	WeatherTech SportsCar Championship; GTD Champion; 2016-2017; With: Alessandro Balzan	Succeeded by Bryan Sellers; Madison Snow
Preceded by Cameron Lawrence; Al Carter	North American Endurance Cup; GTD Champion; 2016; With: Alessandro Balzan	Succeeded by Jeroen Bleekemolen; Ben Keating; Mario Farnbacher
