= 2017 IMSA SportsCar Championship =

47th season of the racing series organized by IMSA

The 2017 IMSA SportsCar Championship (known for sponsorship reasons as the 2017 IMSA WeatherTech SportsCar Championship) was the 47th season of the International Motor Sports Association (IMSA) GT Championship that traces its lineage to the 1971 IMSA GT Championship. It was the fourth season of the United SportsCar Championship and second under the name as the IMSA SportsCar Championship. It began on 28 January with the 24 Hours of Daytona, and ended on 7 October with the Petit Le Mans.

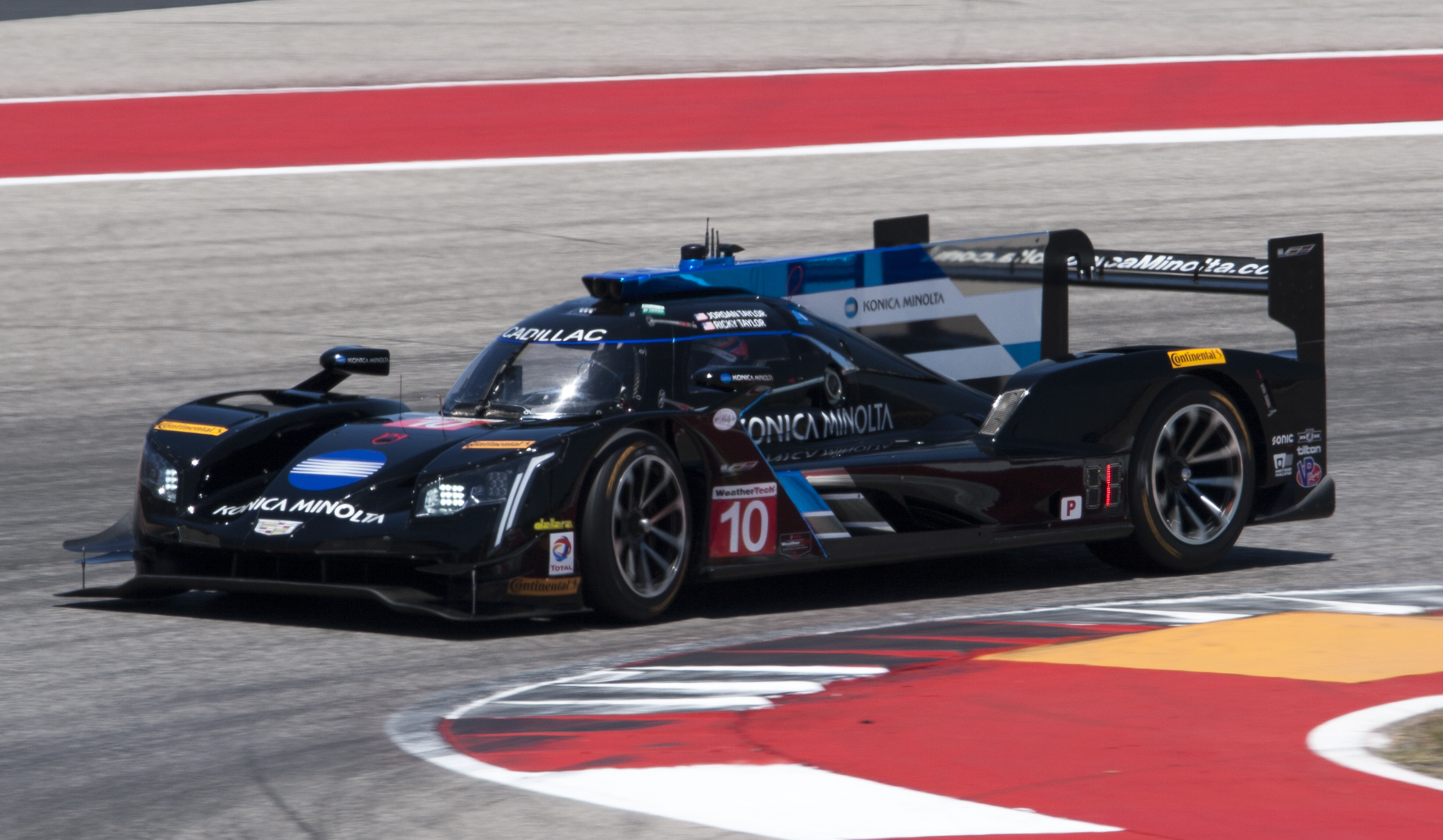
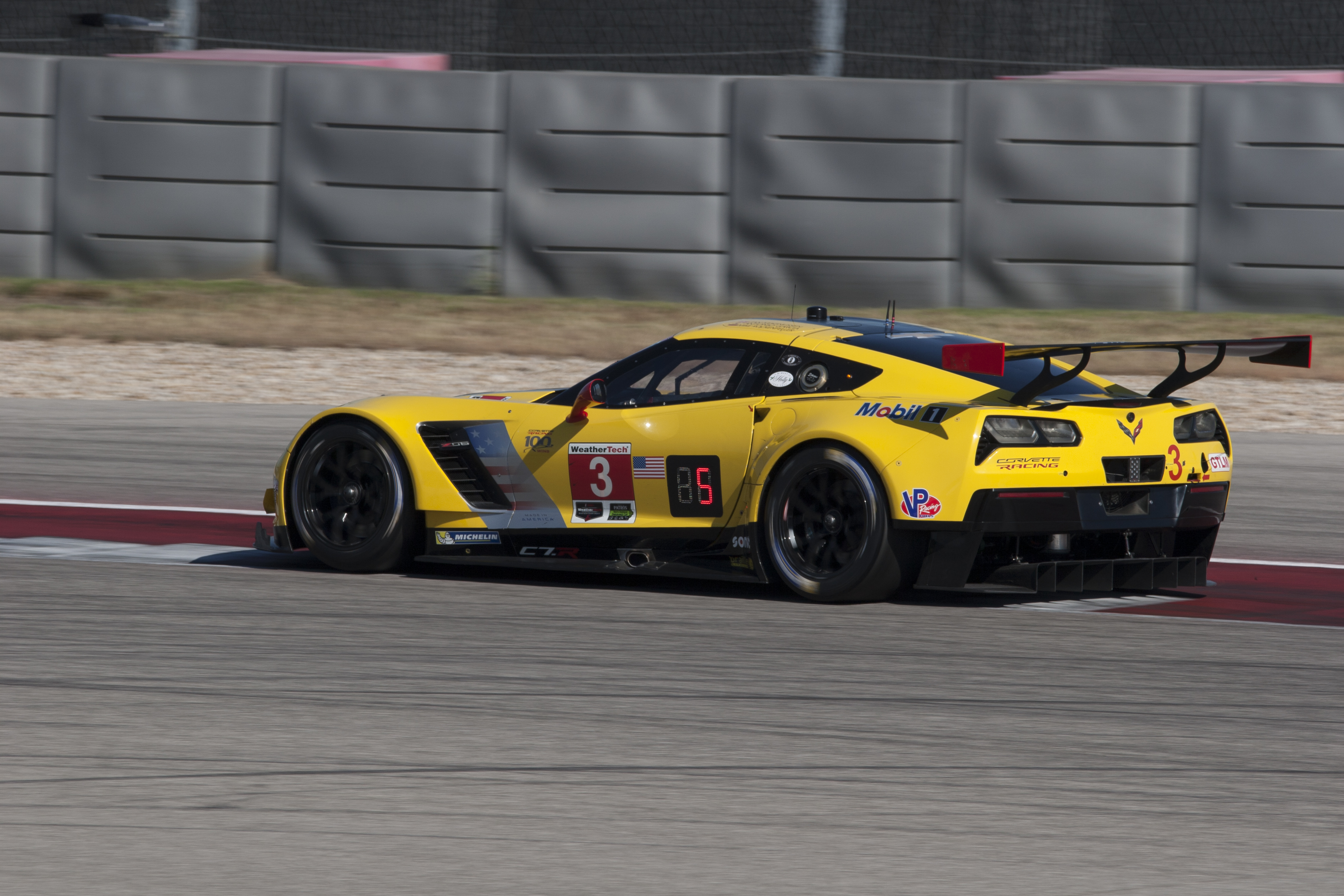
The No. 10 Wayne Taylor Racing car won the Prototype Teams' Championship, with Cadillac winning the Prototype Manufacturers' Championship. The No. 3 Corvette Racing won the GT Le Mans Teams' Championship, with Chevrolet winning the GT Le Mans Manufacturers' Championship.

== Classes ==
The class structure remained largely unchanged from 2016, with the major change coming in Daytona Prototype international (DPi) which replaced Daytona Prototype (DP) machinery.

- Prototype (P) (DPi and LMP2)
- Prototype Challenge (PC)
- GT Le Mans (GTLM)
- GT Daytona (GTD)

== Schedule ==
=== Race schedule ===
The 2017 schedule was released on 5 August 2016 and featured twelve rounds.

Race is part of the Patron North American Endurance Cup

Rnd.	Race	Length	Classes	Circuit	Location	Date
1	Rolex 24 at Daytona	24 hours	All	Daytona International Speedway	Daytona Beach, Florida	January 28–29
2	Mobil 1 Twelve Hours of Sebring	12 hours	All	Sebring International Raceway	Sebring, Florida	March 18
3	BUBBA Burger Sports Car Grand Prix at Long Beach	1 hour 40 minutes	P, GTLM, GTD	Long Beach Street Circuit	Long Beach, California	April 8
4	Advance Auto Parts Sportscar Showdown	2 hours 40 minutes	All	Circuit of the Americas	Austin, Texas	May 6
5	Chevrolet Sports Car Classic	1 hour 40 minutes	P, PC, GTD	The Raceway on Belle Isle	Detroit, Michigan	June 3
6	Sahlen's Six Hours of The Glen	6 hours	All	Watkins Glen International	Watkins Glen, New York	July 2
7	Mobil 1 SportsCar Grand Prix	2 hours 40 minutes	All	Canadian Tire Motorsport Park	Bowmanville, Ontario	July 9
8	Northeast Grand Prix	2 hours 40 minutes	GTLM, GTD	Lime Rock Park	Lakeville, Connecticut	July 22
9	Continental Tire Road Race Showcase	2 hours 40 minutes	All	Road America	Elkhart Lake, Wisconsin	August 6
10	Michelin GT Challenge at VIR	2 hours 40 minutes	GTLM, GTD	Virginia International Raceway	Alton, Virginia	August 27
11	America's Tire 250	2 hours 40 minutes	P, GTLM, GTD	Mazda Raceway Laguna Seca	Monterey, California	September 24
12	Motul Petit Le Mans	10 hours	All	Road Atlanta	Braselton, Georgia	October 7

=== Calendar changes ===
- The dates of the Laguna Seca and Circuit of the Americas rounds were exchanged.
- PC was removed from the lineup at the Long Beach, Lime Rock and Laguna Seca rounds in what was intended to be the final season for the class.
- GTD was added to the lineup at Long Beach.

=== Television Coverage ===
The first 3 hours of the 24 Hours of Daytona and Long Beach were broadcast on Fox. The other rounds were all broadcast on Fox Sports 1, Fox Sports 2, and Fox Sports GO.

== Entries ==
=== Prototype ===
The Prototype class is made up of LMP2 cars both in LMP2 trim, with the ACO specification Gibson V8 engine, and in Daytona Prototype international (DPi) trim, where manufacturers are allowed to alter certain body panels designed to reflect the automaker's design language, and run their own engines. Mazda (Riley Technologies), Cadillac (Dallara), and Nissan (Onroak Automotive) run chassis from the respective constructors featuring manufacturer-specific bodywork.

Team	Chassis	Engine	No.	Drivers	Rounds
(United States) Tequila Patrón ESM	Nissan Onroak DPi	Nissan VR38DETT 3.8 L Turbo V6	2	(United Kingdom) Ryan Dalziel	All
(United States) Tequila Patrón ESM	Nissan Onroak DPi	Nissan VR38DETT 3.8 L Turbo V6	2	(United States) Scott Sharp	All
(United States) Tequila Patrón ESM	Nissan Onroak DPi	Nissan VR38DETT 3.8 L Turbo V6	2	(Brazil) Pipo Derani	1–2, 6
(United States) Tequila Patrón ESM	Nissan Onroak DPi	Nissan VR38DETT 3.8 L Turbo V6	2	(New Zealand) Brendon Hartley	1, 12
(United States) Tequila Patrón ESM	Nissan Onroak DPi	Nissan VR38DETT 3.8 L Turbo V6	22	(United States) Johannes van Overbeek	All
(United States) Tequila Patrón ESM	Nissan Onroak DPi	Nissan VR38DETT 3.8 L Turbo V6	22	(United States) Ed Brown	1–5
(United States) Tequila Patrón ESM	Nissan Onroak DPi	Nissan VR38DETT 3.8 L Turbo V6	22	(Brazil) Bruno Senna	1–2, 6, 12
(United States) Tequila Patrón ESM	Nissan Onroak DPi	Nissan VR38DETT 3.8 L Turbo V6	22	(New Zealand) Brendon Hartley	1–2
(United States) Tequila Patrón ESM	Nissan Onroak DPi	Nissan VR38DETT 3.8 L Turbo V6	22	(Brazil) Pipo Derani	7, 9, 11–12
(United States) / Mustang Sampling Racing (Note: Car No. 5 entered as Mustang Sampling Racing and car No. 31 entered as Whelen Engineering Racing.); (United States) / Whelen Engineering Racing	Cadillac DPi-V.R	Cadillac LT4 6.2 L V8	5	(Portugal) João Barbosa	All
(United States) / Mustang Sampling Racing; (United States) / Whelen Engineering Racing	Cadillac DPi-V.R	Cadillac LT4 6.2 L V8	5	(Brazil) Christian Fittipaldi	All
(United States) / Mustang Sampling Racing; (United States) / Whelen Engineering Racing	Cadillac DPi-V.R	Cadillac LT4 6.2 L V8	5	(Portugal) Filipe Albuquerque	1–2, 6, 12
(United States) / Mustang Sampling Racing; (United States) / Whelen Engineering Racing	Cadillac DPi-V.R	Cadillac LT4 6.2 L V8	31	(United States) Dane Cameron	All
(United States) / Mustang Sampling Racing; (United States) / Whelen Engineering Racing	Cadillac DPi-V.R	Cadillac LT4 6.2 L V8	31	(United States) Eric Curran	All
(United States) / Mustang Sampling Racing; (United States) / Whelen Engineering Racing	Cadillac DPi-V.R	Cadillac LT4 6.2 L V8	31	(United Kingdom) Mike Conway	1–2, 12
(United States) / Mustang Sampling Racing; (United States) / Whelen Engineering Racing	Cadillac DPi-V.R	Cadillac LT4 6.2 L V8	31	(United Kingdom) Seb Morris	1
(United States) / Mustang Sampling Racing; (United States) / Whelen Engineering Racing	Cadillac DPi-V.R	Cadillac LT4 6.2 L V8	31	(Portugal) Filipe Albuquerque	6
(United States) Team Penske	Oreca 07	Gibson GK428 4.2 L V8	6	(Brazil) Hélio Castroneves	12
(United States) Team Penske	Oreca 07	Gibson GK428 4.2 L V8	6	(Colombia) Juan Pablo Montoya	12
(United States) Team Penske	Oreca 07	Gibson GK428 4.2 L V8	6	(France) Simon Pagenaud	12
(United States) Wayne Taylor Racing	Cadillac DPi-V.R	Cadillac LT4 6.2 L V8	10	(United States) Jordan Taylor	All
(United States) Wayne Taylor Racing	Cadillac DPi-V.R	Cadillac LT4 6.2 L V8	10	(United States) Ricky Taylor	All
(United States) Wayne Taylor Racing	Cadillac DPi-V.R	Cadillac LT4 6.2 L V8	10	(Italy) Max Angelelli	1
(United States) Wayne Taylor Racing	Cadillac DPi-V.R	Cadillac LT4 6.2 L V8	10	(United States) Jeff Gordon	1
(United States) Wayne Taylor Racing	Cadillac DPi-V.R	Cadillac LT4 6.2 L V8	10	(United Kingdom) Alex Lynn	2
(United States) Wayne Taylor Racing	Cadillac DPi-V.R	Cadillac LT4 6.2 L V8	10	(United States) Ryan Hunter-Reay	12
(Switzerland) Rebellion Racing	Oreca 07	Gibson GK428 4.2 L V8	13	(Germany) Nick Heidfeld	1–2, 12
(Switzerland) Rebellion Racing	Oreca 07	Gibson GK428 4.2 L V8	13	(Switzerland) Sébastien Buemi	1–2
(Switzerland) Rebellion Racing	Oreca 07	Gibson GK428 4.2 L V8	13	(Switzerland) Neel Jani	1–2
(Switzerland) Rebellion Racing	Oreca 07	Gibson GK428 4.2 L V8	13	(France) Stéphane Sarrazin	1
(Switzerland) Rebellion Racing	Oreca 07	Gibson GK428 4.2 L V8	13	(Switzerland) Mathias Beche	12
(Switzerland) Rebellion Racing	Oreca 07	Gibson GK428 4.2 L V8	13	(United States) Gustavo Menezes	12
(United States) PR1/Mathiasen Motorsports	Ligier JS P217	Gibson GK428 4.2 L V8	52	(United Kingdom) Tom Kimber-Smith	1–3
(United States) PR1/Mathiasen Motorsports	Ligier JS P217	Gibson GK428 4.2 L V8	52	(Mexico) José Gutiérrez	1–2, 4, 6, 9, 11–12
(United States) PR1/Mathiasen Motorsports	Ligier JS P217	Gibson GK428 4.2 L V8	52	(United States) Mike Guasch	1–2
(United States) PR1/Mathiasen Motorsports	Ligier JS P217	Gibson GK428 4.2 L V8	52	(United States) R. C. Enerson	1
(United States) PR1/Mathiasen Motorsports	Ligier JS P217	Gibson GK428 4.2 L V8	52	(United States) Will Owen	3
(United States) PR1/Mathiasen Motorsports	Ligier JS P217	Gibson GK428 4.2 L V8	52	(Italy) Marco Bonanomi	4
(United States) PR1/Mathiasen Motorsports	Ligier JS P217	Gibson GK428 4.2 L V8	52	(United States) Kenton Koch	5
(United States) PR1/Mathiasen Motorsports	Ligier JS P217	Gibson GK428 4.2 L V8	52	(United Kingdom) Ryan Lewis	5
(United States) PR1/Mathiasen Motorsports	Ligier JS P217	Gibson GK428 4.2 L V8	52	(France) Olivier Pla	6, 9, 11–12
(United States) PR1/Mathiasen Motorsports	Ligier JS P217	Gibson GK428 4.2 L V8	52	(United States) Nicholas Boulle	7
(United States) PR1/Mathiasen Motorsports	Ligier JS P217	Gibson GK428 4.2 L V8	52	(Canada) David Ostella	7
(United States) PR1/Mathiasen Motorsports	Ligier JS P217	Gibson GK428 4.2 L V8	52	(France) Julien Canal	12
(Japan) Mazda Motorsports	Mazda RT24-P	Mazda MZ-2.0T 2.0 L Turbo I4	55	(United States) Jonathan Bomarito	1–7
(Japan) Mazda Motorsports	Mazda RT24-P	Mazda MZ-2.0T 2.0 L Turbo I4	55	(United States) Tristan Nunez	1–7
(Japan) Mazda Motorsports	Mazda RT24-P	Mazda MZ-2.0T 2.0 L Turbo I4	55	(United States) Spencer Pigot	1–2, 6
(Japan) Mazda Motorsports	Mazda RT24-P	Mazda MZ-2.0T 2.0 L Turbo I4	70	(United States) Tom Long	1–7
(Japan) Mazda Motorsports	Mazda RT24-P	Mazda MZ-2.0T 2.0 L Turbo I4	70	(United States) Joel Miller	1–7
(Japan) Mazda Motorsports	Mazda RT24-P	Mazda MZ-2.0T 2.0 L Turbo I4	70	(Canada) James Hinchcliffe	1
(Japan) Mazda Motorsports	Mazda RT24-P	Mazda MZ-2.0T 2.0 L Turbo I4	70	(United Kingdom) Marino Franchitti	2, 6
(United States) DragonSpeed	Oreca 07	Gibson GK428 4.2 L V8	81	(France) Loïc Duval	1
(United States) DragonSpeed	Oreca 07	Gibson GK428 4.2 L V8	81	(United Kingdom) Ben Hanley	1
(United States) DragonSpeed	Oreca 07	Gibson GK428 4.2 L V8	81	(Sweden) Henrik Hedman	1
(United States) DragonSpeed	Oreca 07	Gibson GK428 4.2 L V8	81	(France) Nicolas Lapierre	1
(United States) JDC-Miller MotorSports	Oreca 07	Gibson GK428 4.2 L V8	85	(Canada) Mikhail Goikhberg	All
(United States) JDC-Miller MotorSports	Oreca 07	Gibson GK428 4.2 L V8	85	(South Africa) Stephen Simpson	All
(United States) JDC-Miller MotorSports	Oreca 07	Gibson GK428 4.2 L V8	85	(United States) Chris Miller	1–2, 6, 12
(United States) JDC-Miller MotorSports	Oreca 07	Gibson GK428 4.2 L V8	85	(Switzerland) Mathias Beche	1
(United States) VisitFlorida Racing	Riley Mk. 30 1–7; Ligier JS P2179–12	Gibson GK428 4.2 L V8	90	(Belgium) Marc Goossens	1–2, 4–12
(United States) VisitFlorida Racing	Riley Mk. 30 1–7; Ligier JS P2179–12	Gibson GK428 4.2 L V8	90	(Netherlands) Renger van der Zande	1–2, 4–12
(United States) VisitFlorida Racing	Riley Mk. 30 1–7; Ligier JS P2179–12	Gibson GK428 4.2 L V8	90	(Germany) René Rast	1–2
(United States) VisitFlorida Racing	Riley Mk. 30 1–7; Ligier JS P2179–12	Gibson GK428 4.2 L V8	90	(United States) Jonathan Bomarito	12

=== Prototype Challenge ===
All entries use an Oreca FLM09 chassis powered by a LS3 6.2 L V8 engine.

Team	No.	Drivers	Rounds
(United States) Starworks Motorsport	8	(Canada) Chris Cumming	1
(United States) Starworks Motorsport	8	(United States) John Falb	1
(United States) Starworks Motorsport	8	(United States) Ben Keating	1
(United States) Starworks Motorsport	8	(Canada) Remo Ruscitti	1
(United States) Starworks Motorsport	8	(Canada) Robert Wickens	1
(United States) Starworks Motorsport	8	(Canada) Garett Grist	2
(United States) Starworks Motorsport	8	(United States) Max Hanratty	2
(United States) Starworks Motorsport	8	(United States) Sean Rayhall	2
(United States) Starworks Motorsport	88	(United States) Conor Daly	1
(United States) Starworks Motorsport	88	(Canada) James Dayson	1
(United States) Starworks Motorsport	88	(United States) Scott Mayer	1
(United States) Starworks Motorsport	88	(Venezuela) Alex Popow	1
(United States) Starworks Motorsport	88	(United States) Sean Rayhall	1
(United States) BAR1 Motorsports	20	(United States) Don Yount	All
(United States) BAR1 Motorsports	20	(United States) Buddy Rice	1–2, 4, 6, 9, 12
(United States) BAR1 Motorsports	20	(United States) Mark Kvamme	1–2
(United States) BAR1 Motorsports	20	(United States) Chapman Ducote	1
(United States) BAR1 Motorsports	20	(Colombia) Gustavo Yacamán	1
(United States) BAR1 Motorsports	20	(Canada) Daniel Burkett	2, 6, 12
(United States) BAR1 Motorsports	20	(United Kingdom) Ryan Lewis	5, 7
(United States) BAR1 Motorsports	26	(United States) David Cheng	1
(United States) BAR1 Motorsports	26	(United States) Trent Hindman	1
(United States) BAR1 Motorsports	26	(United States) Adam Merzon	1
(United States) BAR1 Motorsports	26	(United Kingdom) Johnny Mowlem	1
(United States) BAR1 Motorsports	26	(United States) Tom Papadopoulos	1
(United States) BAR1 Motorsports	26	(Colombia) Gustavo Yacamán	2, 6, 9
(United States) BAR1 Motorsports	26	(United States) Marc Drumwright	2
(United States) BAR1 Motorsports	26	(United States) Chapman Ducote	2
(United States) BAR1 Motorsports	26	(United States) Colin Thompson	2
(United States) BAR1 Motorsports	26	(United States) Nicholas Boulle	4
(United States) BAR1 Motorsports	26	(United Kingdom) Stefan Wilson	4
(United States) BAR1 Motorsports	26	(United States) Tomy Drissi	5, 12
(United States) BAR1 Motorsports	26	(Brazil) Bruno Junqueira	5
(United States) BAR1 Motorsports	26	(United States) Brian Alder	6
(United States) BAR1 Motorsports	26	(United States) Derek Jones	6
(United States) BAR1 Motorsports	26	(Canada) Garett Grist	7, 12
(United States) BAR1 Motorsports	26	(Canada) James Vance	7
(United States) BAR1 Motorsports	26	(United States) Mark Kvamme	9
(United States) BAR1 Motorsports	26	(United States) John Falb	12
(United States) Performance Tech Motorsports	38	(United States) James French	All
(United States) Performance Tech Motorsports	38	(Mexico) Patricio O'Ward	All
(United States) Performance Tech Motorsports	38	(United States) Kyle Masson	1–2, 6, 12
(United States) Performance Tech Motorsports	38	(United States) Nicholas Boulle	1

=== GT Le Mans ===
Team	Chassis	Engine	No.	Drivers	Rounds
(United States) Corvette Racing	Chevrolet Corvette C7.R	Chevrolet LT5.5R 5.5 L V8	3	(Spain) Antonio García	All
(United States) Corvette Racing	Chevrolet Corvette C7.R	Chevrolet LT5.5R 5.5 L V8	3	(Denmark) Jan Magnussen	All
(United States) Corvette Racing	Chevrolet Corvette C7.R	Chevrolet LT5.5R 5.5 L V8	3	(Germany) Mike Rockenfeller	1–2, 12
(United States) Corvette Racing	Chevrolet Corvette C7.R	Chevrolet LT5.5R 5.5 L V8	4	(United Kingdom) Oliver Gavin	All
(United States) Corvette Racing	Chevrolet Corvette C7.R	Chevrolet LT5.5R 5.5 L V8	4	(United States) Tommy Milner	All
(United States) Corvette Racing	Chevrolet Corvette C7.R	Chevrolet LT5.5R 5.5 L V8	4	(Switzerland) Marcel Fässler	1–2, 12
(United States) BMW Team RLL	BMW M6 GTLM	BMW S63 4.4 L Turbo V8	19	(United States) Bill Auberlen	1
(United States) BMW Team RLL	BMW M6 GTLM	BMW S63 4.4 L Turbo V8	19	(Brazil) Augusto Farfus	1
(United States) BMW Team RLL	BMW M6 GTLM	BMW S63 4.4 L Turbo V8	19	(United Kingdom) Alexander Sims	1
(United States) BMW Team RLL	BMW M6 GTLM	BMW S63 4.4 L Turbo V8	19	(Canada) Bruno Spengler	1
(United States) BMW Team RLL	BMW M6 GTLM	BMW S63 4.4 L Turbo V8	24	(United States) John Edwards	All
(United States) BMW Team RLL	BMW M6 GTLM	BMW S63 4.4 L Turbo V8	24	(Germany) Martin Tomczyk	All
(United States) BMW Team RLL	BMW M6 GTLM	BMW S63 4.4 L Turbo V8	24	(Netherlands) Nick Catsburg	1–2, 12
(United States) BMW Team RLL	BMW M6 GTLM	BMW S63 4.4 L Turbo V8	24	(Canada) Kuno Wittmer	1
(United States) BMW Team RLL	BMW M6 GTLM	BMW S63 4.4 L Turbo V8	25	(United States) Bill Auberlen	2–4, 6–12
(United States) BMW Team RLL	BMW M6 GTLM	BMW S63 4.4 L Turbo V8	25	(United Kingdom) Alexander Sims	2–4, 6–12
(United States) BMW Team RLL	BMW M6 GTLM	BMW S63 4.4 L Turbo V8	25	(Canada) Kuno Wittmer	2, 12
(United States) Risi Competizione	Ferrari 488 GTE	Ferrari F154CB 4.0 L Turbo V8	62	(Italy) Giancarlo Fisichella	1–4, 10–12
(United States) Risi Competizione	Ferrari 488 GTE	Ferrari F154CB 4.0 L Turbo V8	62	(Finland) Toni Vilander	1–4, 10–12
(United States) Risi Competizione	Ferrari 488 GTE	Ferrari F154CB 4.0 L Turbo V8	62	(United Kingdom) James Calado	1–2
(United States) Risi Competizione	Ferrari 488 GTE	Ferrari F154CB 4.0 L Turbo V8	62	(Italy) Alessandro Pier Guidi	12
(United States) (United Kingdom) / Ford Chip Ganassi Racing (Note: Cars No. 66 and 67 entered as Ford Chip Ganassi Racing and cars No. 68 and 69 entered as Ford Chip Ganassi Team UK.); (United States) (United Kingdom) / Ford Chip Ganassi Team UK	Ford GT	Ford EcoBoost D35 3.5 L Turbo V6	66	(United States) Joey Hand	All
(United States) (United Kingdom) / Ford Chip Ganassi Racing; (United States) (United Kingdom) / Ford Chip Ganassi Team UK	Ford GT	Ford EcoBoost D35 3.5 L Turbo V6	66	(Germany) Dirk Müller	All
(United States) (United Kingdom) / Ford Chip Ganassi Racing; (United States) (United Kingdom) / Ford Chip Ganassi Team UK	Ford GT	Ford EcoBoost D35 3.5 L Turbo V6	66	(France) Sébastien Bourdais	1–2, 12
(United States) (United Kingdom) / Ford Chip Ganassi Racing; (United States) (United Kingdom) / Ford Chip Ganassi Team UK	Ford GT	Ford EcoBoost D35 3.5 L Turbo V6	67	(Australia) Ryan Briscoe	All
(United States) (United Kingdom) / Ford Chip Ganassi Racing; (United States) (United Kingdom) / Ford Chip Ganassi Team UK	Ford GT	Ford EcoBoost D35 3.5 L Turbo V6	67	(United Kingdom) Richard Westbrook	All
(United States) (United Kingdom) / Ford Chip Ganassi Racing; (United States) (United Kingdom) / Ford Chip Ganassi Team UK	Ford GT	Ford EcoBoost D35 3.5 L Turbo V6	67	(New Zealand) Scott Dixon	1–2, 12
(United States) (United Kingdom) / Ford Chip Ganassi Racing; (United States) (United Kingdom) / Ford Chip Ganassi Team UK	Ford GT	Ford EcoBoost D35 3.5 L Turbo V6	68	(United States) Billy Johnson	1–2
(United States) (United Kingdom) / Ford Chip Ganassi Racing; (United States) (United Kingdom) / Ford Chip Ganassi Team UK	Ford GT	Ford EcoBoost D35 3.5 L Turbo V6	68	(Germany) Stefan Mücke	1–2
(United States) (United Kingdom) / Ford Chip Ganassi Racing; (United States) (United Kingdom) / Ford Chip Ganassi Team UK	Ford GT	Ford EcoBoost D35 3.5 L Turbo V6	68	(France) Olivier Pla	1–2
(United States) (United Kingdom) / Ford Chip Ganassi Racing; (United States) (United Kingdom) / Ford Chip Ganassi Team UK	Ford GT	Ford EcoBoost D35 3.5 L Turbo V6	69	(Brazil) Tony Kanaan	1
(United States) (United Kingdom) / Ford Chip Ganassi Racing; (United States) (United Kingdom) / Ford Chip Ganassi Team UK	Ford GT	Ford EcoBoost D35 3.5 L Turbo V6	69	(United Kingdom) Andy Priaulx	1
(United States) (United Kingdom) / Ford Chip Ganassi Racing; (United States) (United Kingdom) / Ford Chip Ganassi Team UK	Ford GT	Ford EcoBoost D35 3.5 L Turbo V6	69	(United Kingdom) Harry Tincknell	1
(United States) Porsche GT Team	Porsche 911 RSR	Porsche M97/80 4.0 L Flat-6	911	(France) Patrick Pilet	All
(United States) Porsche GT Team	Porsche 911 RSR	Porsche M97/80 4.0 L Flat-6	911	(Germany) Dirk Werner	All
(United States) Porsche GT Team	Porsche 911 RSR	Porsche M97/80 4.0 L Flat-6	911	(France) Frédéric Makowiecki	1–2
(United States) Porsche GT Team	Porsche 911 RSR	Porsche M97/80 4.0 L Flat-6	911	(United Kingdom) Nick Tandy	12
(United States) Porsche GT Team	Porsche 911 RSR	Porsche M97/80 4.0 L Flat-6	912	(Belgium) Laurens Vanthoor	All
(United States) Porsche GT Team	Porsche 911 RSR	Porsche M97/80 4.0 L Flat-6	912	(France) Kévin Estre	1–3
(United States) Porsche GT Team	Porsche 911 RSR	Porsche M97/80 4.0 L Flat-6	912	(Austria) Richard Lietz	1–2
(United States) Porsche GT Team	Porsche 911 RSR	Porsche M97/80 4.0 L Flat-6	912	(Germany) Wolf Henzler	4
(United States) Porsche GT Team	Porsche 911 RSR	Porsche M97/80 4.0 L Flat-6	912	(Italy) Gianmaria Bruni	6–12
(United States) Porsche GT Team	Porsche 911 RSR	Porsche M97/80 4.0 L Flat-6	912	(New Zealand) Earl Bamber	12

=== GT Daytona ===
Team	Chassis	Engine	No.	Drivers	Rounds
(Austria) GRT Grasser Racing Team	Lamborghini Huracán GT3	Lamborghini DFJ 5.2 L V10	11	(Italy) Mirko Bortolotti	1–2
(Austria) GRT Grasser Racing Team	Lamborghini Huracán GT3	Lamborghini DFJ 5.2 L V10	11	(Germany) Christian Engelhart	1–2
(Austria) GRT Grasser Racing Team	Lamborghini Huracán GT3	Lamborghini DFJ 5.2 L V10	11	(Switzerland) Rolf Ineichen	1–2
(Austria) GRT Grasser Racing Team	Lamborghini Huracán GT3	Lamborghini DFJ 5.2 L V10	11	(Argentina) Ezequiel Pérez Companc	1
(Austria) GRT Grasser Racing Team	Lamborghini Huracán GT3	Lamborghini DFJ 5.2 L V10	11	(United States) Richard Antinucci	2
(Austria) GRT Grasser Racing Team	Lamborghini Huracán GT3	Lamborghini DFJ 5.2 L V10	61	(Italy) Michele Beretta	1
(Austria) GRT Grasser Racing Team	Lamborghini Huracán GT3	Lamborghini DFJ 5.2 L V10	61	(Germany) Christian Engelhart	1
(Austria) GRT Grasser Racing Team	Lamborghini Huracán GT3	Lamborghini DFJ 5.2 L V10	61	(Switzerland) Rolf Ineichen	1
(Austria) GRT Grasser Racing Team	Lamborghini Huracán GT3	Lamborghini DFJ 5.2 L V10	61	(Italy) Roberto Pampanini	1
(Austria) GRT Grasser Racing Team	Lamborghini Huracán GT3	Lamborghini DFJ 5.2 L V10	61	(Serbia) Miloš Pavlović	1
(United States) 3GT Racing	Lexus RC F GT3	Lexus 2UR-GSE 5.4 L V8	14	(United States) Sage Karam	All
(United States) 3GT Racing	Lexus RC F GT3	Lexus 2UR-GSE 5.4 L V8	14	(United States) Scott Pruett	1–8
(United States) 3GT Racing	Lexus RC F GT3	Lexus 2UR-GSE 5.4 L V8	14	(United Kingdom) Ian James	1–2, 12
(United States) 3GT Racing	Lexus RC F GT3	Lexus 2UR-GSE 5.4 L V8	14	(United States) Gustavo Menezes	1
(United States) 3GT Racing	Lexus RC F GT3	Lexus 2UR-GSE 5.4 L V8	14	(United States) Austin Cindric	6
(United States) 3GT Racing	Lexus RC F GT3	Lexus 2UR-GSE 5.4 L V8	14	(United States) Robert Alon	9–12
(United States) 3GT Racing	Lexus RC F GT3	Lexus 2UR-GSE 5.4 L V8	15	(United Kingdom) Jack Hawksworth	All
(United States) 3GT Racing	Lexus RC F GT3	Lexus 2UR-GSE 5.4 L V8	15	(United States) Robert Alon	1–8
(United States) 3GT Racing	Lexus RC F GT3	Lexus 2UR-GSE 5.4 L V8	15	(United States) Austin Cindric	1–2, 6, 12
(United States) 3GT Racing	Lexus RC F GT3	Lexus 2UR-GSE 5.4 L V8	15	(Germany) Dominik Farnbacher	1
(United States) 3GT Racing	Lexus RC F GT3	Lexus 2UR-GSE 5.4 L V8	15	(United States) Scott Pruett	9–12
(United States) Change Racing	Lamborghini Huracán GT3	Lamborghini DFJ 5.2 L V10	16	(United States) Corey Lewis	All
(United States) Change Racing	Lamborghini Huracán GT3	Lamborghini DFJ 5.2 L V10	16	(Netherlands) Jeroen Mul	All
(United States) Change Racing	Lamborghini Huracán GT3	Lamborghini DFJ 5.2 L V10	16	(United States) Brett Sandberg	1–2, 6, 12
(United States) Change Racing	Lamborghini Huracán GT3	Lamborghini DFJ 5.2 L V10	16	(United States) Kaz Grala	1
(Canada) DAC Motorsports	Lamborghini Huracán GT3	Lamborghini DFJ 5.2 L V10	18	(Canada) Emmanuel Anassis	1–2
(Canada) DAC Motorsports	Lamborghini Huracán GT3	Lamborghini DFJ 5.2 L V10	18	(United States) Brandon Gdovic	1–2
(Canada) DAC Motorsports	Lamborghini Huracán GT3	Lamborghini DFJ 5.2 L V10	18	(United States) Anthony Massari	1–2
(Canada) DAC Motorsports	Lamborghini Huracán GT3	Lamborghini DFJ 5.2 L V10	18	(Canada) Zachary Claman DeMelo	1
(Austria) Konrad Motorsport	Lamborghini Huracán GT3	Lamborghini DFJ 5.2 L V10	21	(Germany) Marc Basseng	1
(Austria) Konrad Motorsport	Lamborghini Huracán GT3	Lamborghini DFJ 5.2 L V10	21	(Austria) Franz Konrad	1
(Austria) Konrad Motorsport	Lamborghini Huracán GT3	Lamborghini DFJ 5.2 L V10	21	(Italy) Marco Mapelli	1
(Austria) Konrad Motorsport	Lamborghini Huracán GT3	Lamborghini DFJ 5.2 L V10	21	(Germany) Luca Stolz	1
(Austria) Konrad Motorsport	Lamborghini Huracán GT3	Lamborghini DFJ 5.2 L V10	21	(United States) Lance Willsey	1
(United States) Alex Job Racing	Audi R8 LMS	Audi DAR 5.2 L V10	23	(United States) Townsend Bell	1–2, 6, 8, 12
(United States) Alex Job Racing	Audi R8 LMS	Audi DAR 5.2 L V10	23	(United States) Bill Sweedler	1–2, 6, 8, 12
(United States) Alex Job Racing	Audi R8 LMS	Audi DAR 5.2 L V10	23	(United States) Frankie Montecalvo	1–2, 6, 12
(United States) Alex Job Racing	Audi R8 LMS	Audi DAR 5.2 L V10	23	(Germany) Pierre Kaffer	1
(United States) Dream Racing Motorsport	Lamborghini Huracán GT3	Lamborghini DFJ 5.2 L V10	27	(Italy) Paolo Ruberti	1–2, 6
(United States) Dream Racing Motorsport	Lamborghini Huracán GT3	Lamborghini DFJ 5.2 L V10	27	(Monaco) Cédric Sbirrazzuoli	1–2, 6
(United States) Dream Racing Motorsport	Lamborghini Huracán GT3	Lamborghini DFJ 5.2 L V10	27	(United States) Lawrence DeGeorge	1–2
(United States) Dream Racing Motorsport	Lamborghini Huracán GT3	Lamborghini DFJ 5.2 L V10	27	(Italy) Raffaele Giammaria	1
(United States) Dream Racing Motorsport	Lamborghini Huracán GT3	Lamborghini DFJ 5.2 L V10	27	(Italy) Luca Persiani	1
(United States) Alegra Motorsports	Porsche 911 GT3 R	Porsche 4.0 L Flat-6	28	(Canada) Daniel Morad	All
(United States) Alegra Motorsports	Porsche 911 GT3 R	Porsche 4.0 L Flat-6	28	(Denmark) Michael Christensen	1–3, 6, 12
(United States) Alegra Motorsports	Porsche 911 GT3 R	Porsche 4.0 L Flat-6	28	(United States) Michael de Quesada	1–2, 6–7, 9, 12
(United States) Alegra Motorsports	Porsche 911 GT3 R	Porsche 4.0 L Flat-6	28	(United States) Carlos de Quesada	1
(United States) Alegra Motorsports	Porsche 911 GT3 R	Porsche 4.0 L Flat-6	28	(Canada) Jesse Lazare	1
(United States) Alegra Motorsports	Porsche 911 GT3 R	Porsche 4.0 L Flat-6	28	(United States) Spencer Pumpelly	2
(United States) Alegra Motorsports	Porsche 911 GT3 R	Porsche 4.0 L Flat-6	28	(France) Mathieu Jaminet	4–5
(United States) Alegra Motorsports	Porsche 911 GT3 R	Porsche 4.0 L Flat-6	28	(United States) Patrick Long	8, 10–11
(Germany) Montaplast by Land-Motorsport	Audi R8 LMS	Audi DAR 5.2 L V10	29	(United States) Connor De Phillippi	1–2, 12
(Germany) Montaplast by Land-Motorsport	Audi R8 LMS	Audi DAR 5.2 L V10	29	(Germany) Christopher Mies	1–2, 12
(Germany) Montaplast by Land-Motorsport	Audi R8 LMS	Audi DAR 5.2 L V10	29	(France) Jules Gounon	1–2
(Germany) Montaplast by Land-Motorsport	Audi R8 LMS	Audi DAR 5.2 L V10	29	(Switzerland) Jeffrey Schmidt	1
(Germany) Montaplast by Land-Motorsport	Audi R8 LMS	Audi DAR 5.2 L V10	29	(South Africa) Sheldon van der Linde	12
(United States) / Riley Motorsports - Team AMG (Note: Car No. 33 entered as Riley Motorsports - Team AMG and car No. 50 entered as Riley Motorsports - WeatherTech Racing.); (United States) / Riley Motorsports - WeatherTech Racing	Mercedes-AMG GT3	Mercedes-AMG M159 6.2 L V8	33	(Netherlands) Jeroen Bleekemolen	All
(United States) / Riley Motorsports - Team AMG; (United States) / Riley Motorsports - WeatherTech Racing	Mercedes-AMG GT3	Mercedes-AMG M159 6.2 L V8	33	(United States) Ben Keating	1–9, 11–12
(United States) / Riley Motorsports - Team AMG; (United States) / Riley Motorsports - WeatherTech Racing	Mercedes-AMG GT3	Mercedes-AMG M159 6.2 L V8	33	(Germany) Mario Farnbacher	1–2, 6, 12
(United States) / Riley Motorsports - Team AMG; (United States) / Riley Motorsports - WeatherTech Racing	Mercedes-AMG GT3	Mercedes-AMG M159 6.2 L V8	33	(United Kingdom) Adam Christodoulou	1
(United States) / Riley Motorsports - Team AMG; (United States) / Riley Motorsports - WeatherTech Racing	Mercedes-AMG GT3	Mercedes-AMG M159 6.2 L V8	33	(United States) Trent Hindman	10
(United States) / Riley Motorsports - Team AMG; (United States) / Riley Motorsports - WeatherTech Racing	Mercedes-AMG GT3	Mercedes-AMG M159 6.2 L V8	50	(United States) Gunnar Jeannette	1–8
(United States) / Riley Motorsports - Team AMG; (United States) / Riley Motorsports - WeatherTech Racing	Mercedes-AMG GT3	Mercedes-AMG M159 6.2 L V8	50	(United States) Cooper MacNeil	1–8
(United States) / Riley Motorsports - Team AMG; (United States) / Riley Motorsports - WeatherTech Racing	Mercedes-AMG GT3	Mercedes-AMG M159 6.2 L V8	50	(New Zealand) Shane van Gisbergen	1–2, 6
(United States) / Riley Motorsports - Team AMG; (United States) / Riley Motorsports - WeatherTech Racing	Mercedes-AMG GT3	Mercedes-AMG M159 6.2 L V8	50	(Germany) Thomas Jäger	1
(United States) / Riley Motorsports - Team AMG; (United States) / Riley Motorsports - WeatherTech Racing	Porsche 911 GT3 R	Porsche 4.0 L Flat-6	50	(United States) Gunnar Jeannette	9–12
(United States) / Riley Motorsports - Team AMG; (United States) / Riley Motorsports - WeatherTech Racing	Porsche 911 GT3 R	Porsche 4.0 L Flat-6	50	(United States) Cooper MacNeil	9–12
(United States) / Riley Motorsports - Team AMG; (United States) / Riley Motorsports - WeatherTech Racing	Porsche 911 GT3 R	Porsche 4.0 L Flat-6	50	(United States) Patrick Long	12
(Italy) EBIMOTORS	Lamborghini Huracán GT3	Lamborghini DFJ 5.2 L V10	46	(Italy) Fabio Babini	1–2
(Italy) EBIMOTORS	Lamborghini Huracán GT3	Lamborghini DFJ 5.2 L V10	46	(Italy) Emanuele Busnelli	1–2
(Italy) EBIMOTORS	Lamborghini Huracán GT3	Lamborghini DFJ 5.2 L V10	46	(France) Emmanuel Collard	1–2
(Italy) EBIMOTORS	Lamborghini Huracán GT3	Lamborghini DFJ 5.2 L V10	46	(France) François Perrodo	1
(Italy) EBIMOTORS	Lamborghini Huracán GT3	Lamborghini DFJ 5.2 L V10	46	(Italy) Michele Beretta	2
(United States) Paul Miller Racing	Lamborghini Huracán GT3	Lamborghini DFJ 5.2 L V10	48	(United States) Bryan Sellers	All
(United States) Paul Miller Racing	Lamborghini Huracán GT3	Lamborghini DFJ 5.2 L V10	48	(United States) Madison Snow	All
(United States) Paul Miller Racing	Lamborghini Huracán GT3	Lamborghini DFJ 5.2 L V10	48	(South Africa) Dion von Moltke	1–2
(United States) Paul Miller Racing	Lamborghini Huracán GT3	Lamborghini DFJ 5.2 L V10	48	(Italy) Andrea Caldarelli	1
(United States) Paul Miller Racing	Lamborghini Huracán GT3	Lamborghini DFJ 5.2 L V10	48	(United States) Bryce Miller	1
(United States) Paul Miller Racing	Lamborghini Huracán GT3	Lamborghini DFJ 5.2 L V10	48	(United States) Trent Hindman	12
(Switzerland) Spirit of Race	Ferrari 488 GT3	Ferrari F154CB 3.9 L Turbo V8	51	(United States) Peter Mann	1
(Switzerland) Spirit of Race	Ferrari 488 GT3	Ferrari F154CB 3.9 L Turbo V8	51	(Italy) Rino Mastronardi	1
(Switzerland) Spirit of Race	Ferrari 488 GT3	Ferrari F154CB 3.9 L Turbo V8	51	(Italy) Maurizio Mediani	1
(Switzerland) Spirit of Race	Ferrari 488 GT3	Ferrari F154CB 3.9 L Turbo V8	51	(Italy) Alessandro Pier Guidi	1
(Switzerland) Spirit of Race	Ferrari 488 GT3	Ferrari F154CB 3.9 L Turbo V8	51	(Italy) Davide Rigon	1
(United States) CORE Autosport	Porsche 911 GT3 R	Porsche 4.0 L Flat-6	54	(United States) Jon Bennett	All
(United States) CORE Autosport	Porsche 911 GT3 R	Porsche 4.0 L Flat-6	54	(United States) Colin Braun	All
(United States) CORE Autosport	Porsche 911 GT3 R	Porsche 4.0 L Flat-6	54	(Sweden) Niclas Jönsson	1–2, 6, 12
(United States) CORE Autosport	Porsche 911 GT3 R	Porsche 4.0 L Flat-6	54	(United States) Patrick Long	1
(United States) Stevenson Motorsports	Audi R8 LMS	Audi DAR 5.2 L V10	57	(United States) Lawson Aschenbach	All
(United States) Stevenson Motorsports	Audi R8 LMS	Audi DAR 5.2 L V10	57	(United States) Andrew Davis	All
(United States) Stevenson Motorsports	Audi R8 LMS	Audi DAR 5.2 L V10	57	(United States) Matt Bell	1–2, 12
(United States) Stevenson Motorsports	Audi R8 LMS	Audi DAR 5.2 L V10	57	(United Kingdom) Robin Liddell	1
(Germany) Manthey Racing	Porsche 911 GT3 R	Porsche 4.0 L Flat-6	59	(Italy) Matteo Cairoli	1
(Germany) Manthey Racing	Porsche 911 GT3 R	Porsche 4.0 L Flat-6	59	(Germany) Sven Müller	1
(Germany) Manthey Racing	Porsche 911 GT3 R	Porsche 4.0 L Flat-6	59	(Austria) Harald Proczyk	1
(Germany) Manthey Racing	Porsche 911 GT3 R	Porsche 4.0 L Flat-6	59	(Germany) Reinhold Renger	1
(Germany) Manthey Racing	Porsche 911 GT3 R	Porsche 4.0 L Flat-6	59	(Switzerland) Steve Smith	1
(United States) Scuderia Corsa	Ferrari 488 GT3	Ferrari F154CB 3.9 L Turbo V8	63	(Italy) Alessandro Balzan	All
(United States) Scuderia Corsa	Ferrari 488 GT3	Ferrari F154CB 3.9 L Turbo V8	63	(Denmark) Christina Nielsen	All
(United States) Scuderia Corsa	Ferrari 488 GT3	Ferrari F154CB 3.9 L Turbo V8	63	(Italy) Matteo Cressoni	1–2, 6, 12
(United States) Scuderia Corsa	Ferrari 488 GT3	Ferrari F154CB 3.9 L Turbo V8	63	(United Kingdom) Sam Bird	1
(United States) Park Place Motorsports	Porsche 911 GT3 R	Porsche 4.0 L Flat-6	73	(United States) Patrick Lindsey	All
(United States) Park Place Motorsports	Porsche 911 GT3 R	Porsche 4.0 L Flat-6	73	(Germany) Jörg Bergmeister	1–5, 7–12
(United States) Park Place Motorsports	Porsche 911 GT3 R	Porsche 4.0 L Flat-6	73	(United States) Matt McMurry	1–2, 6, 12
(United States) Park Place Motorsports	Porsche 911 GT3 R	Porsche 4.0 L Flat-6	73	(Austria) Norbert Siedler	1
(United States) Park Place Motorsports	Porsche 911 GT3 R	Porsche 4.0 L Flat-6	73	(Belgium) Jan Heylen	2
(Australia) SunEnergy1 Racing	Mercedes-AMG GT3	Mercedes-AMG M159 6.2 L V8	75	(France) Tristan Vautier	All
(Australia) SunEnergy1 Racing	Mercedes-AMG GT3	Mercedes-AMG M159 6.2 L V8	75	(United States) Boris Said	1–3, 6
(Australia) SunEnergy1 Racing	Mercedes-AMG GT3	Mercedes-AMG M159 6.2 L V8	75	(Australia) Kenny Habul	1–2, 4–7, 9–12
(Australia) SunEnergy1 Racing	Mercedes-AMG GT3	Mercedes-AMG M159 6.2 L V8	75	(Germany) Maro Engel	1
(Australia) SunEnergy1 Racing	Mercedes-AMG GT3	Mercedes-AMG M159 6.2 L V8	75	(Australia) Paul Morris	1
(Australia) SunEnergy1 Racing	Mercedes-AMG GT3	Mercedes-AMG M159 6.2 L V8	75	(South Africa) Dion von Moltke	8, 12
(United States) Lone Star Racing	Mercedes-AMG GT3	Mercedes-AMG M159 6.2 L V8	80	(United States) Dan Knox	4, 9–11
(United States) Lone Star Racing	Mercedes-AMG GT3	Mercedes-AMG M159 6.2 L V8	80	(United States) Mike Skeen	4, 9–11
(United States) Michael Shank Racing with Curb-Agajanian	Acura NSX GT3	Acura JNC1 3.5 L Turbo V6	86	(Brazil) Oswaldo Negri Jr.	All
(United States) Michael Shank Racing with Curb-Agajanian	Acura NSX GT3	Acura JNC1 3.5 L Turbo V6	86	(United States) Jeff Segal	All
(United States) Michael Shank Racing with Curb-Agajanian	Acura NSX GT3	Acura JNC1 3.5 L Turbo V6	86	(United States) Tom Dyer	1–2, 12
(United States) Michael Shank Racing with Curb-Agajanian	Acura NSX GT3	Acura JNC1 3.5 L Turbo V6	86	(United States) Ryan Hunter-Reay	1
(United States) Michael Shank Racing with Curb-Agajanian	Acura NSX GT3	Acura JNC1 3.5 L Turbo V6	93	(United States) Andy Lally	All
(United States) Michael Shank Racing with Curb-Agajanian	Acura NSX GT3	Acura JNC1 3.5 L Turbo V6	93	(United Kingdom) Katherine Legge	All
(United States) Michael Shank Racing with Curb-Agajanian	Acura NSX GT3	Acura JNC1 3.5 L Turbo V6	93	(Canada) Mark Wilkins	1–2, 12
(United States) Michael Shank Racing with Curb-Agajanian	Acura NSX GT3	Acura JNC1 3.5 L Turbo V6	93	(United States) Graham Rahal	1
(United States) Turner Motorsport	BMW M6 GT3	BMW S63 4.4 L Turbo V8	96	(Germany) Jens Klingmann	All
(United States) Turner Motorsport	BMW M6 GT3	BMW S63 4.4 L Turbo V8	96	(United States) Justin Marks	1–2, 6, 12
(United States) Turner Motorsport	BMW M6 GT3	BMW S63 4.4 L Turbo V8	96	(Finland) Jesse Krohn	1–2, 8–12
(United States) Turner Motorsport	BMW M6 GT3	BMW S63 4.4 L Turbo V8	96	(Belgium) Maxime Martin	1
(United States) Turner Motorsport	BMW M6 GT3	BMW S63 4.4 L Turbo V8	96	(United States) Bret Curtis	3–5, 7
(United Kingdom) Aston Martin Racing	Aston Martin V12 Vantage GT3	Aston Martin AM11 6.0 L V12	98	(Canada) Paul Dalla Lana	1
(United Kingdom) Aston Martin Racing	Aston Martin V12 Vantage GT3	Aston Martin AM11 6.0 L V12	98	(Portugal) Pedro Lamy	1
(United Kingdom) Aston Martin Racing	Aston Martin V12 Vantage GT3	Aston Martin AM11 6.0 L V12	98	(Austria) Mathias Lauda	1
(United Kingdom) Aston Martin Racing	Aston Martin V12 Vantage GT3	Aston Martin AM11 6.0 L V12	98	(Denmark) Marco Sørensen	1
(United States) TRG	Aston Martin V12 Vantage GT3	Aston Martin AM11 6.0 L V12	007	(United States) Brandon Davis	8
(United States) TRG	Aston Martin V12 Vantage GT3	Aston Martin AM11 6.0 L V12	007	(Australia) James Davison	8
(United States) TRG	Porsche 911 GT3 R	Porsche 4.0 L Flat-6	991	(Germany) Wolf Henzler	1, 3
(United States) TRG	Porsche 911 GT3 R	Porsche 4.0 L Flat-6	991	(Belgium) Jan Heylen	1, 3
(United States) TRG	Porsche 911 GT3 R	Porsche 4.0 L Flat-6	991	(Mexico) Santiago Creel	1
(United States) TRG	Porsche 911 GT3 R	Porsche 4.0 L Flat-6	991	(United States) Mike Hedlund	1
(United States) TRG	Porsche 911 GT3 R	Porsche 4.0 L Flat-6	991	(United States) Tim Pappas	1
(United States) TRG	Porsche 911 GT3 R	Porsche 4.0 L Flat-6	991	(United States) Parker Chase	4
(United States) TRG	Porsche 911 GT3 R	Porsche 4.0 L Flat-6	991	(United States) Harry Gottsacker	4

== Race results ==
Bold indicates overall winner.

Rnd	Circuit	Prototype Winning Team	PC Winning Team	GTLM Winning Team	GTD Winning Team	Report
Rnd	Circuit	Prototype Winning Drivers	PC Winning Drivers	GTLM Winning Drivers	GTD Winning Drivers	Report
1	Daytona	**(United States) No. 10 Wayne Taylor Racing**	(United States) No. 38 Performance Tech Motorsports	(United States) No. 66 Ford Chip Ganassi Racing	(United States) No. 28 Alegra Motorsports	Report
1	Daytona	**(Italy) Max Angelelli** **(United States) Jeff Gordon** **(United States) Jordan Taylor** **(United States) Ricky Taylor**	(United States) Nicholas Boulle (United States) James French (United States) Kyle Masson (Mexico) Patricio O'Ward	(France) Sébastien Bourdais (United States) Joey Hand (Germany) Dirk Müller	(Denmark) Michael Christensen (Canada) Jesse Lazare (Canada) Daniel Morad (United States) Carlos de Quesada (United States) Michael de Quesada	Report
2	Sebring	**(United States) No. 10 Wayne Taylor Racing**	(United States) No. 38 Performance Tech Motorsports	(United States) No. 3 Corvette Racing	(United States) No. 33 Riley Motorsports - Team AMG	Report
2	Sebring	**(United Kingdom) Alex Lynn** **(United States) Jordan Taylor** **(United States) Ricky Taylor**	(United States) James French (United States) Kyle Masson (Mexico) Patricio O'Ward	(Spain) Antonio García (Denmark) Jan Magnussen (Germany) Mike Rockenfeller	(Netherlands) Jeroen Bleekemolen (Germany) Mario Farnbacher (United States) Ben Keating	Report
3	Long Beach	**(United States) No. 10 Wayne Taylor Racing**	did not participate	(United States) No. 4 Corvette Racing	(United States) No. 50 Riley Motorsports - WeatherTech Racing	Report
3	Long Beach	**(United States) Jordan Taylor** **(United States) Ricky Taylor**	did not participate	(United Kingdom) Oliver Gavin (United States) Tommy Milner	(United States) Gunnar Jeannette (United States) Cooper MacNeil	Report
4	Austin	**(United States) No. 10 Wayne Taylor Racing**	(United States) No. 38 Performance Tech Motorsports	(United States) No. 3 Corvette Racing	(United States) No. 33 Riley Motorsports - Team AMG	Report
4	Austin	**(United States) Jordan Taylor** **(United States) Ricky Taylor**	(United States) James French (Mexico) Patricio O'Ward	(Spain) Antonio García (Denmark) Jan Magnussen	(Netherlands) Jeroen Bleekemolen (United States) Ben Keating	Report
5	Belle Isle	**(United States) No. 10 Wayne Taylor Racing**	(United States) No. 38 Performance Tech Motorsports	did not participate	(United States) No. 93 Michael Shank Racing	Report
5	Belle Isle	**(United States) Jordan Taylor** **(United States) Ricky Taylor**	(United States) James French (Mexico) Patricio O'Ward	did not participate	(United States) Andy Lally (United Kingdom) Katherine Legge	Report
6	Watkins Glen	**(United States) No. 5 Mustang Sampling Racing**	(United States) No. 38 Performance Tech Motorsports	(United States) No. 25 BMW Team RLL	(United States) No. 93 Michael Shank Racing	Report
6	Watkins Glen	**(Portugal) Filipe Albuquerque** **(Portugal) João Barbosa** **(Brazil) Christian Fittipaldi**	(United States) James French (United States) Kyle Masson (Mexico) Patricio O'Ward	(United States) Bill Auberlen (United Kingdom) Alexander Sims	(United States) Andy Lally (United Kingdom) Katherine Legge	Report
7	Mosport	**(United States) No. 31 Whelen Engineering Racing**	(United States) No. 38 Performance Tech Motorsports	(United States) No. 25 BMW Team RLL	(United States) No. 57 Stevenson Motorsports	Report
7	Mosport	**(United States) Eric Curran** **(United States) Dane Cameron**	(United States) James French (Mexico) Patricio O'Ward	(United States) Bill Auberlen (United Kingdom) Alexander Sims	(United States) Lawson Aschenbach (United States) Andrew Davis	Report
8	Lime Rock	did not participate	did not participate	**(United States) No. 911 Porsche GT Team**	(United States) No. 73 Park Place Motorsports	Report
8	Lime Rock	did not participate	did not participate	**(France) Patrick Pilet** **(Germany) Dirk Werner**	(Germany) Jörg Bergmeister (United States) Patrick Lindsey	Report
9	Road America	**(United States) No. 22 Tequila Patrón ESM**	(United States) No. 38 Performance Tech Motorsports	(United States) No. 66 Ford Chip Ganassi Racing	(United States) No. 96 Turner Motorsport	Report
9	Road America	**(Brazil) Pipo Derani** **(United States) Johannes van Overbeek**	(United States) James French (Mexico) Patricio O'Ward	(United States) Joey Hand (Germany) Dirk Müller	(Germany) Jens Klingmann (Finland) Jesse Krohn	Report
10	Virginia	did not participate	did not participate	**(United States) No. 3 Corvette Racing**	(United States) No. 16 Change Racing	Report
10	Virginia	did not participate	did not participate	**(Spain) Antonio García** **(Denmark) Jan Magnussen**	(United States) Corey Lewis (Netherlands) Jeroen Mul	Report
11	Laguna Seca	**(United States) No. 90 VisitFlorida Racing**	did not participate	(United States) No. 24 BMW Team RLL	(United States) No. 63 Scuderia Corsa	Report
11	Laguna Seca	**(Belgium) Marc Goossens** **(Netherlands) Renger van der Zande**	did not participate	(United States) John Edwards (Germany) Martin Tomczyk	(Italy) Alessandro Balzan (Denmark) Christina Nielsen	Report
12	Road Atlanta	**(United States) No. 2 Tequila Patrón ESM**	(United States) No. 26 BAR1 Motorsports	(United States) No. 25 BMW Team RLL	(Germany) No. 29 Montaplast by Land-Motorsport	Report
12	Road Atlanta	**(United Kingdom) Ryan Dalziel** **(New Zealand) Brendon Hartley** **(United States) Scott Sharp**	(United States) Tomy Drissi (United States) John Falb (Canada) Garett Grist	(United States) Bill Auberlen (Canada) Kuno Wittmer (United Kingdom) Alexander Sims	(United States) Connor De Phillippi (South Africa) Sheldon van der Linde (Germany) Christopher Mies	Report

== Championship standings ==
=== Points systems ===
Championship points are awarded in each class at the finish of each event. Points are awarded based on finishing positions as shown in the chart below.

Position	1	2	3	4	5	6	7	8	9	10	11	12	13	14	15	16	17	18	19	20	21	22	23	24	25	26	27	28	29	30	FL
Race	35	32	30	28	26	25	24	23	22	21	20	19	18	17	16	15	14	13	12	11	10	9	8	7	6	5	4	3	2	1	1

Drivers points

Points are awarded in each class at the finish of each event. The point for the fastest lap is only awarded in the drivers' championship.

Team points

Team points are calculated in exactly the same way as driver points, using the point distribution chart. Each car entered is considered its own "team" regardless if it is a single entry or part of a two-car team.

Manufacturer points

There are also a number of manufacturer championships which utilize the same season-long point distribution chart. The manufacturer championships recognized by IMSA are as follows:

Prototype (P): Engine Manufacturer
GT Le Mans (GTLM): Car Manufacturer
GT Daytona (GTD): Car Manufacturer

Each manufacturer receives finishing points for its highest finishing car in each class. The positions of subsequent finishing cars from the same manufacturer are not taken into consideration, and all other manufacturers move up in the order.

Example: Manufacturer A finishes 1st and 2nd at an event, and Manufacturer B finishes 3rd. Manufacturer A receives 35 first-place points while Manufacturer B would earn 32 second-place points.

North American Endurance Cup

The points system for the North American Endurance Cup is different from the normal points system. Points are awarded on a 5-4-3-2 basis for drivers, teams and manufacturers. The first finishing position at each interval earns five points, four points for second position, three points for third, with two points awarded for fourth and each subsequent finishing position.

Position	1	2	3	Other Classified
Race	5	4	3	2

At Daytona (24 hour race), points are awarded at six hours, 12 hours, 18 hours and at the finish. At the Sebring (12 hour race), points are awarded at four hours, eight hours and at the finish. At Watkins Glen (6 hour race), points are awarded at three hours and at the finish. At Road Atlanta (10 hour race), points are awarded at four hours, eight hours and at the finish.

Like the season-long team championship, North American Endurance Cup team points are awarded for each car and drivers get points in any car that they drive, in which they are entered for points. The manufacturer points go to the highest placed car from that manufacturer (the others from that manufacturer not being counted), just like the season-long manufacturer championship.

For example: in any particular segment manufacturer A finishes 1st and 2nd and manufacturer B finishes 3rd. Manufacturer A only receives first-place points for that segment. Manufacturer B receives the second-place points.

=== Drivers' championships ===
Race is part of the North American Endurance Cup

==== Prototype ====
Pos.	Driver	**DAY**	**SEB**	LBH	AUS	BEL	**WGL**	MOS	ELK	LGA	**ATL**	Points	NAEC
1	(United States) Jordan Taylor	1	1	1	1	1	6	7	2	3	9	310	42
1	(United States) Ricky Taylor	1	1	**1**	**1**	1	6	**7**	**2**	**3**	9	310	42
2	(United States) Dane Cameron	6	3	8	2	2	10^{1}	1	4	2	2	291	29
2	(United States) Eric Curran	6	3	8	2	2	10^{1}	1	4	2	2	291	29
3	(Portugal) João Barbosa	**2**	2	7	3	4	1	6	6	5	5	284	46
3	(Brazil) Christian Fittipaldi	2	2	7	3	**4**	1	6	6	5	5	284	46
4	(Canada) Mikhail Goikhberg	5	4	4	4	6	2	2	8	4	6	277	28
4	(South Africa) Stephen Simpson	5	4	4	4	6	2	2	8	4	6	277	28
5	(United Kingdom) Ryan Dalziel	4	11	2	6	8	7	3	3	6	1	273	30
5	(United States) Scott Sharp	4	11	2	6	8	7	3	3	6	1	273	30
6	(United States) Johannes van Overbeek	7	10	9	5	7	8	9	1	8	4	249	31
7	(Belgium) Marc Goossens	3	6	WD	7	9	5	10	5	1	7	233	29
7	(Netherlands) Renger van der Zande	3	6	WD	7	9	5	10	5	1	7	233	29
8	(United States) Jonathan Bomarito	11	5	3	10	5	3	4			7	205	27
9	(Brazil) Pipo Derani	4	11				**7**	9	1	8	4	181	28
10	(United States) Tristan Nunez	11	5	3	10	5	3	4				181	20
11	(United States) Tom Long	12	8	6	8	3	9	5				168	18
11	(United States) Joel Miller	12	8	6	8	3	9	5				168	18
12	(Mexico) José Gutiérrez	9	7		9		4		7	7	10	167	20
13	(Portugal) Filipe Albuquerque	2	2				1				5	126	46
14	(United States) Ed Brown	7	10	9	5	7						117	14
15	(United States) Chris Miller	5	4				2				6	111	28
16	(France) Olivier Pla						4		7	7	10	99	10
17	(Brazil) Bruno Senna	7	10				8				4	97	31
18	(United Kingdom) Mike Conway	6	3								2	88	25
19	(New Zealand) Brendon Hartley	7	10								1	80	26
20	(United States) Spencer Pigot	11	5				3					76	20
21	(United Kingdom) Tom Kimber-Smith	9	7	5								72	14
22	(Germany) Nick Heidfeld	8	9								8	68	20
23	(Germany) René Rast	3	6									55	18
24	(Switzerland) Mathias Beche	5									8	49	14
25	(United States) Mike Guasch	9	7									46	14
26	(Switzerland) Sébastien Buemi	8	9									45	14
26	(Switzerland) Neel Jani	8	**9**									45	14
27	(United Kingdom) Marino Franchitti		8				9					45	10
28	(Italy) Max Angelelli	1										35	18
28	(United States) Jeff Gordon	1										35	18
29	(United Kingdom) Alex Lynn		1									35	14
30	(Brazil) Hélio Castroneves										**3**	30	9
30	(Colombia) Juan Pablo Montoya										3	30	9
30	(France) Simon Pagenaud										3	30	9
31	(United States) Will Owen			5								26	–
32	(United Kingdom) Seb Morris	6										25	10
33	(France) Stéphane Sarrazin	8										23	8
34	(United States) Nicholas Boulle							8				23	–
34	(Canada) David Ostella							8				23	–
35	(United States) Gustavo Menezes										8	23	6
36	(United States) R. C. Enerson	9										22	8
37	(Italy) Marco Bonanomi				9							22	–
38	(United States) Ryan Hunter-Reay										9	24	6
39	(France) Loïc Duval	10										21	8
39	(United Kingdom) Ben Hanley	10										21	8
39	(Sweden) Henrik Hedman	10										21	8
39	(France) Nicolas Lapierre	10										21	8
40	(United States) Kenton Koch					10						21	–
40	(United Kingdom) Ryan Lewis					10						21	–
41	(France) Julien Canal										10	21	6
42	(Canada) James Hinchcliffe	12										19	8

Colour	Result
Gold	Winner
Silver	Second place
Bronze	Third place
Green	Points classification
Blue	Non-points classification
Blue	Non-classified finish (NC)
Purple	Retired, not classified (Ret)
Red	Did not qualify (DNQ)
Red	Did not pre-qualify (DNPQ)
Black	Disqualified (DSQ)
White	Did not start (DNS)
White	Withdrew (WD)
White	Race cancelled (C)
Blank	Did not practice (DNP)
Blank	Did not arrive (DNA)
Blank	Excluded (EX)

**Bold** - Pole position
Italics - Fastest lap

Notes

- ^{1} – Relegated to last in class for violation of minimum drive time requirements.

==== Prototype Challenge ====
Pos.	Driver	**DAY**	**SEB**	AUS	BEL	**WGL**	MOS	ELK	**ATL**	Points	NAEC
1	(United States) James French	**1**	1	**1**	**1**	**1**	**1**	**1**	**3**	283	56
1	(Mexico) Patricio O'Ward	1	1	1	1	1	1	1	3	283	56
2	(United States) Don Yount	3	4	3	3	2	2	3	2	244	40
3	(United States) Buddy Rice	3	4	3		2		3	2	182	40
4	(United States) Kyle Masson	1	1			1			3	139	56
5	(Colombia) Gustavo Yacamán	3	**3**			3		2		121	29
6	(Canada) Garett Grist		2				3		1	97	25
7	(Canada) Daniel Burkett		4			2			2	92	26
8	(United States) Mark Kvamme	3	4					2		90	20
9	(United States) Nicholas Boulle	1		2						68	20
10	(United States) Tomy Drissi				2				1	67	13
11	(United Kingdom) Ryan Lewis				3		2			62	–
12	(United States) John Falb	5							1	61	21
13	(United States) Sean Rayhall	4	2							60	20
14	(United States) Chapman Ducote	3	3							59	23
15	(United States) David Cheng	2								32	14
15	(United States) Trent Hindman	2								32	14
15	(United States) Adam Merzon	2								32	14
15	(United Kingdom) Johnny Mowlem	2								32	14
15	(United States) Tom Papadopoulos	2								32	14
16	(United States) Max Hanratty		2							32	12
17	(United Kingdom) Stefan Wilson			2						32	–
18	(Brazil) Bruno Junqueira				2					32	–
19	(United States) Derek Jones					3				30	6
19	(United States) Brian Adler					3				30	6
20	(Canada) James Vance						3			30	–
21	(United States) Marc Drumwright		3							29	9
21	(United States) Colin Thompson		3							29	9
22	(United States) Conor Daly	4								28	8
22	(Canada) James Dayson	4								28	8
22	(United States) Scott Mayer	4								28	8
22	(Venezuela) Alex Popow	4								28	8
23	(Canada) Chris Cumming	5								26	8
23	(United States) Ben Keating	5								26	8
23	(Canada) Remo Ruscitti	5								26	8
23	(Canada) Robert Wickens	5								26	8

==== GT Le Mans ====
Pos.	Driver	**DAY**	**SEB**	LBH	AUS	**WGL**	MOS	LIM	ELK	VIR	LGA	**ATL**	Points	NAEC
1	(Spain) Antonio García	4	1	5	1	3	4	4	4	1	4	2	334	32
1	(Denmark) Jan Magnussen	4	1	**5**	1	3	4	4	4	1	4	2	334	32
2	(United States) Bill Auberlen	8	6	4	2	1	1	6	6	4	8	1	317	37
2	(United Kingdom) Alexander Sims	8	6	4	2	1	1	6	6	4	8	1	317	37
3	(United States) Joey Hand	**1**	2	8	5	**4**	5	7	1	**5**	6	7	306	39
3	(Germany) Dirk Müller	1	2	8	5	4	5	7	**1**	5	6	7	306	39
4	(Australia) Ryan Briscoe	10	**4**	2	6	2	3	5	3	2	5	8	306	30
4	(United Kingdom) Richard Westbrook	10	4	2	6	2	3	5	3	2	5	8	306	30
5	(France) Patrick Pilet	2	7	6	4	7	7	1	8	8	3	6	295	40
5	(Germany) Dirk Werner	2	7	6	4	7	**7**	1	8	8	3	6	295	40
6	(Belgium) Laurens Vanthoor	6	8	3	8	6	6	2	2	7	7	5	287	30
7	(United States) John Edwards	11	9	7	**3**	8	2	3	7	9	1	9	284	24
7	(Germany) Martin Tomczyk	11	9	7	3	8	2	3	7	9	1	9	284	24
8	(United Kingdom) Oliver Gavin	9	10	1	7	5	8	8	5	6	9	4	276	27
8	(United States) Tommy Milner	9	10	1	7	5	8	8	5	6	9	4	276	27
9	(Italy) Giancarlo Fisichella	3	3	9	9					3	2	3	199	23
9	(Finland) Toni Vilander	3	3	9	9					3	**2**	**3**	199	23
10	(Italy) Gianmaria Bruni					6	6	**2**	2	7	7	5	186	13
11	(Germany) Mike Rockenfeller	4	1									2	95	27
12	(France) Sébastien Bourdais	1	2									7	91	35
13	(Canada) Kuno Wittmer	11	6									1	80	27
14	(France) Kévin Estre	6	8	3									78	17
15	(New Zealand) Scott Dixon	10	4									8	73	24
16	(Switzerland) Marcel Fässler	9	10									4	71	20
17	(Netherlands) Nick Catsburg	11	9									9	64	20
18	(United Kingdom) James Calado	3	3										60	16
19	(France) Frédéric Makowiecki	2	7										57	27
20	(United States) Billy Johnson	7	5										50	16
20	(Germany) Stefan Mücke	7	5										50	16
20	(France) Olivier Pla	7	5										50	16
21	(Austria) Richard Lietz	6	8										48	17
22	(Italy) Alessandro Pier Guidi											3	31	7
23	(Brazil) Tony Kanaan	5											26	8
23	(United Kingdom) Andy Priaulx	5											26	8
23	(United Kingdom) Harry Tincknell	5											26	8
24	(New Zealand) Earl Bamber											5	26	9
25	(United Kingdom) Nick Tandy											6	25	8
26	(Brazil) Augusto Farfus	8											23	9
26	(Canada) Bruno Spengler	8											23	9
27	(Germany) Wolf Henzler				8								23	–

==== GT Daytona ====
Pos.	Driver	**DAY**	**SEB**	LBH	AUS	BEL	**WGL**	MOS	LIM	ELK	VIR	LGA	**ATL**	Points	NAEC
1	(Italy) Alessandro Balzan	16	2	3	2	2	2	3	6	5	4	1	9	340	36
1	(Denmark) Christina Nielsen	16	2	3	2	2	2	3	6	5	4	1	9	340	36
2	(Netherlands) Jeroen Bleekemolen	3	1	2	1	14	10	7	15	4	3	8	4	320	39
3	(United States) Patrick Lindsey	24	6	4	8	9	8	9	1	2	10	3	3	298	26
4	(Germany) Jens Klingmann	8	20	9	5	4	3	4	14	1	2	5	15	294	28
5	(United States) Ben Keating	3	1	2	1	14	10	7	15	4		8	4	290	39
6	(United States) Andy Lally	11	14	7	15	1	**1**	2	5	15	15	2	14	286	32
6	(United Kingdom) Katherine Legge	11	14	7	15	1	1	2	5	15	15	2	14	286	32
7	(United States) Lawson Aschenbach	4	7	13	10	**13**	9	1	4	3	12	11	13	283	25
7	(United States) Andrew Davis	4	7	13	10	13	9	1	4	3	12	11	13	283	25
8	(Canada) Daniel Morad	1	10	12	7	10	7	15	3	11	9	16	2	281	29
9	(United States) Bryan Sellers	7	5	**16**	4	3	12	8	2	6	5	7	7	281	24
9	(United States) Madison Snow	7	5	16	4	3	12	8	**2**	6	5	**7**	7	281	24
10	(Germany) Jörg Bergmeister	24	6	4	8	9		9	1	2	10	3	3	275	22
11	(United States) Gunnar Jeannette	21	21	1	6	12	4	11	10	9	6	6	17	254	28
11	(United States) Cooper MacNeil	21	21	1	6	12	4	11	10	9	6	6	17	254	28
12	(United States) Robert Alon	14	13	11	13	7	5	12	7	8	7	14	10	252	24
13	(Brazil) Oswaldo Negri Jr.	5	8	10	11	5	16	10	9	14	14	10	12	248	33
13	(United States) Jeff Segal	5	8	10	11	5	16	10	9	14	14	10	12	248	33
14	(United Kingdom) Jack Hawksworth	14	13	11	13	7	5	12	7	10	13	13	8	248	24
15	(United States) Sage Karam	27	18	6	9	6	6	**5**	12	8	7	14	10	244	24
16	(United States) Scott Pruett	27	18	6	9	6	6	5	12	10	13	13	8	240	24
17	(United States) Corey Lewis	25	11	8	17	11	17	6	11	13	1	9	11	237	24
17	(Netherlands) Jeroen Mul	25	11	8	17	11	17	6	11	**13**	**1**	9	11	237	24
18	(United States) Jon Bennett	22	16	14	14	8	13	14	17	7	8	4	5	231	24
18	(United States) Colin Braun	22	16	14	14	8	13	14	17	7	8	4	5	231	24
19	(France) Tristan Vautier	18	**3**	15	3	15	15	13	16	12	16	12	16	224	25
20	(Australia) Kenny Habul	18	3		3	15	15	13		12	16	12	16	192	25
21	(Finland) Jesse Krohn	8	20						14	1	2	5	15	160	22
22	(United States) Michael de Quesada	1	10				7	15		11			2	148	29
23	(Denmark) Michael Christensen	1	10	12			7						2	131	29
24	(Germany) Mario Farnbacher	3	1				10						4	115	39
25	(United States) Townsend Bell	6	15				14		8				6	106	25
25	(United States) Bill Sweedler	6	15				14		8				6	106	25
26	(United States) Bret Curtis			9	5	4		4						104	–
27	(Italy) Matteo Cressoni	16	2				2						**9**	101	36
28	(Germany) Christopher Mies	2	4										1	96	30
28	(United States) Connor De Phillippi	2	4										1	96	30
29	(United States) Patrick Long	22							3		9	16	17	90	14
30	(United States) Matt McMurry	24	6				8						3	85	26
31	(United States) Austin Cindric	14	13				6						8	85	24
32	(United States) Frankie Montecalvo	6	15				14						6	83	25
33	(United States) Justin Marks	8	20				3						15	80	28
34	(South Africa) Dion von Moltke	7	5						16				16	80	20
35	(United States) Boris Said	18	3	15			15							76	19
36	(Belgium) Jan Heylen	10	6	5										72	14
37	(United States) Matt Bell	4	7										13	70	21
38	(United States) Tom Dyer	5	8										12	68	26
39	(Sweden) Niclas Jönsson	22	16				13						5	68	24
40	(France) Jules Gounon	2	4											60	19
41	(United States) Brett Sandberg	25	11				17						11	60	24
42	(United States) Dan Knox				12					DNS	11	15		55	–
42	(United States) Mike Skeen				12					DNS	11	15		55	–
43	(United States) Trent Hindman										3		7	54	6
44	(Canada) Mark Wilkins	11	14										14	54	25
45	(New Zealand) Shane van Gisbergen	21	21				4							48	22
46	(Germany) Wolf Henzler	10		5										47	8
47	(France) Mathieu Jaminet				**7**	10								47	–
48	(Italy) Paolo Ruberti	19	19				11							44	18
48	(Monaco) Cédric Sbirrazzuoli	19	19				11							44	18
49	(Italy) Fabio Babini	9	12											41	14
49	(Italy) Emanuele Busnelli	9	12											41	14
49	(France) Emmanuel Collard	9	12											41	14
50	(Italy) Mirko Bortolotti	15	9											38	14
50	(Germany) Christian Engelhart	15	9											38	14
50	(Switzerland) Rolf Ineichen	15	9											38	14
51	(United Kingdom) Ian James	27	18										10	38	20
52	(South Africa) Sheldon van der Linde												1	36	11
53	(Canada) Jesse Lazare	1												35	11
53	(United States) Carlos de Quesada	1												35	11
54	(Italy) Michele Beretta	17	12											33	14
55	(Switzerland) Jeffrey Schmidt	2												32	12
56	(Canada) Emmanuel Anassis	13	17											32	14
56	(United States) Brandon Gdovic	13	17											32	14
56	(United States) Anthony Massari	13	17											32	14
57	(United Kingdom) Adam Christodoulou	3												30	10
58	(United Kingdom) Robin Liddell	4												28	9
59	(United States) Ryan Hunter-Reay	5												26	14
60	(Germany) Pierre Kaffer	6												25	9
61	(Italy) Andrea Caldarelli	7												24	8
61	(United States) Bryce Miller	7												24	8
62	(Italy) Luca Persiani	19	19											24	14
63	(Belgium) Maxime Martin	8												23	8
64	(France) François Perrodo	9												22	8
65	(United States) Richard Antinucci		9											22	6
66	(Mexico) Santiago Creel	10												21	8
66	(United States) Mike Hedlund	10												21	8
66	(United States) Tim Pappas	10												21	8
67	(United States) Spencer Pumpelly		10											21	6
68	(United States) Graham Rahal	11												20	10
69	(Canada) Paul Dalla Lana	12												19	8
69	(Portugal) Pedro Lamy	12												19	8
69	(Austria) Mathias Lauda	12												19	8
69	(Denmark) Marco Sørensen	12												19	8
70	(Canada) Zachary Claman DeMelo	13												18	8
71	(Australia) James Davison								13					18	–
71	(United States) Brandon Davis								13					18	–
72	(Germany) Dominik Farnbacher	14												17	8
73	(Argentina) Ezequiel Pérez Companc	15												16	8
74	(United Kingdom) Sam Bird	16												15	10
75	(United States) Parker Chase				16									15	–
75	(United States) Harry Gottsacker				16									15	–
76	(Italy) Roberto Pampanini	17												14	8
76	(Serbia) Miloš Pavlović	17												14	8
77	(Germany) Maro Engel	18												13	8
77	(Australia) Paul Morris	18												13	8
78	(United States) Lawrence DeGeorge	19												12	8
78	(Italy) Raffaele Giammaria	19												12	8
79	(Germany) Marc Basseng	20												11	8
79	(Austria) Franz Konrad	20												11	8
79	(Italy) Marco Mapelli	20												11	8
79	(Germany) Luca Stolz	20												11	8
79	(United States) Lance Willsey	20												11	8
80	(Germany) Thomas Jäger	21												10	11
81	(United States) Peter Mann	23												9	8
81	(Italy) Rino Mastronardi	23												9	8
81	(Italy) Maurizio Mediani	23												9	8
81	(Italy) Alessandro Pier Guidi	**23**												9	8
81	(Italy) Davide Rigon	23												9	8
82	(Austria) Norbert Siedler	24												7	8
83	(United States) Kaz Grala	25												6	8
84	(Italy) Matteo Cairoli	26												5	8
84	(Germany) Sven Müller	26												5	8
84	(Austria) Harald Proczyk	26												5	8
84	(Germany) Reinhold Renger	26												5	8
84	(Switzerland) Steve Smith	26												5	8
85	(United States) Gustavo Menezes	27												4	8

=== Teams' championships ===
==== Prototype ====
Pos.	Team	**DAY**	**SEB**	LBH	AUS	BEL	**WGL**	MOS	ELK	LGA	**ATL**	Points	NAEC
1	No. 10 Wayne Taylor Racing	1	1	**1**	**1**	1	6	**7**	**2**	**3**	9	310	**42**
2	No. 31 Action Express Racing	6	3	8	2	2	10	1	4	2	2	291	29
3	No. 5 Action Express Racing	**2**	2	7	3	**4**	1	6	6	5	5	284	**47**
4	No. 85 JDC-Miller MotorSports	5	4	4	4	6	2	2	8	4	6	277	28
5	No. 2 Tequila Patrón ESM	4	11	2	6	8	**7**	3	3	6	1	273	30
6	No. 22 Tequila Patrón ESM	7	10	9	5	7	8	9	1	8	4	249	**33**
7	No. 52 PR1/Mathiasen Motorsports	9	7	5	9	10	4	8	7	7	10	237	24
8	No. 90 VisitFlorida Racing	3	6	WD	7	9	5	10	5	1	7	233	29
9	No. 55 Mazda Motorsports	11	5	3	10	5	3	4				181	20
10	No. 70 Mazda Motorsports	12	8	6	8	3	9	5				168	18
11	No. 13 Rebellion Racing	8	**9**								8	68	18
12	No. 6 Team Penske										**3**	30	–
13	No. 81 DragonSpeed	10										21	8

==== Prototype Challenge ====
Pos.	Team	**DAY**	**SEB**	AUS	BEL	**WGL**	MOS	ELK	**ATL**	Points	NAEC
1	No. 38 Performance Tech Motorsports	**1**	1	**1**	**1**	**1**	**1**	**1**	**3**	283	**56**
2	No. 26 BAR1 Motorsports	2	**3**	2	2	3	3	2	1	252	**42**
3	No. 20 BAR1 Motorsports	3	4	3	3	2	2	3	2	244	**40**
4	No. 8 Starworks Motorsport	5	2							58	20
5	No. 88 Starworks Motorsport	4								28	8

==== GT Le Mans ====
Pos.	Team	**DAY**	**SEB**	LBH	AUS	**WGL**	MOS	LIM	ELK	VIR	LGA	**ATL**	Points	NAEC
1	No. 3 Corvette Racing	4	1	**5**	1	3	4	4	4	1	4	2	334	32
2	No. 25 BMW Team RLL	8	6	4	2	1	1	6	6	4	8	1	317	**37**
3	No. 66 Ford Chip Ganassi Racing	**1**	2	8	5	**4**	5	7	**1**	**5**	6	7	306	**39**
4	No. 67 Ford Chip Ganassi Racing	10	**4**	2	6	2	3	5	3	2	5	8	306	30
5	No. 911 Porsche GT Team	2	7	6	4	7	**7**	1	8	8	3	6	295	**40**
6	No. 912 Porsche GT Team	6	8	3	8	6	6	**2**	2	7	7	5	287	30
7	No. 24 BMW Team RLL	11	9	7	**3**	8	2	3	7	9	1	9	284	24
8	No. 4 Corvette Racing	9	10	1	7	5	8	8	5	6	9	4	276	28
9	No. 62 Risi Competizione	3	3	9	9					3	**2**	**3**	199	16
10	No. 68 Ford Chip Ganassi Team UK	7	5										50	16
11	No. 69 Ford Chip Ganassi Team UK	5											26	8

==== GT Daytona ====
Pos.	Team	**DAY**	**SEB**	LBH	AUS	BEL	**WGL**	MOS	LIM	ELK	VIR	LGA	**ATL**	Points	NAEC
1	No. 63 Scuderia Corsa	16	2	3	2	2	2	3	6	5	4	1	**9**	340	**36**
2	No. 33 Riley Motorsports Team AMG	3	1	2	1	14	10	7	15	4	3	8	4	320	**40**
3	No. 73 Park Place Motorsports	24	6	4	8	9	8	9	1	2	10	3	3	298	28
4	No. 96 Turner Motorsport	8	20	9	5	4	3	4	14	1	2	5	15	294	28
5	No. 93 Meyer Shank Racing with Curb-Agajanian	11	14	7	15	1	**1**	2	5	15	15	2	14	286	32
6	No. 57 Stevenson Motorsports	4	7	13	10	**13**	9	1	4	3	12	11	13	283	25
7	No. 28 Alegra Motorsports	1	10	12	**7**	10	7	15	3	11	9	16	2	281	31
8	No. 48 Paul Miller Racing	7	5	**16**	4	3	12	8	**2**	6	5	**7**	7	281	24
9	No. 50 Riley Motorsports WeatherTech Racing	21	21	1	6	12	4	11	10	9	6	6	17	254	28
10	No. 86 Meyer Shank Racing with Curb-Agajanian	5	8	10	11	5	16	10	9	14	14	10	12	248	**33**
11	No. 15 3GT Racing	14	13	11	13	7	5	12	7	10	13	13	8	248	24
12	No. 14 3GT Racing	27	18	6	9	6	6	**5**	12	8	7	14	10	244	24
13	No. 16 Change Racing	25	11	8	17	11	17	6	11	**13**	**1**	9	11	237	24
14	No. 54 Porsche Motorsport	22	16	14	14	8	13	14	17	7	8	4	5	231	24
15	No. 75 SunEnergy1 Racing	18	**3**	15	3	15	15	13	16	12	16	12	16	224	25
16	No. 23 Alex Job Racing	6	15				14		8				6	106	25
17	No. 29 Montaplast by Land-Motorsport	2	4										1	96	19
18	No. 991 TRG-AMR	10		5	16									62	8
19	No. 80 Lone Star Racing				12					DNS	11	15		55	–
20	No. 27 Dream Racing Motorsport	19	19				11							44	18
21	No. 46 EBIMOTORS	9	12											41	14
22	No. 11 GRT Grasser Racing Team	15	9											38	14
23	No. 18 DAC Motorsports	13	17											32	14
24	No. 98 Aston Martin Racing	12												19	8
25	No. 007 TRG-AMR								13					18	–
26	No. 61 GRT Grasser Racing Team	17												14	8
27	No. 21 Konrad Motorsport	20												11	8
28	No. 51 Spirit of Race	**23**												9	8
29	No. 59 Manthey Racing	26												5	8

=== Manufacturers' championships ===
==== Prototype ====
Pos.	Manufacturer	**DAY**	**SEB**	LBH	AUS	BEL	**WGL**	MOS	ELK	LGA	**ATL**	Points	NAEC
1	Cadillac	**1**	1	**1**	**1**	**1**	1	**1**	**2**	**2**	2	344	56
2	Nissan	4	10	2	6	7	**7**	3	1	6	1	320	49
3	Mazda	11	5	3	8	3	3	4				216	30
Manufacturers ineligible for championship points
	Gibson	3	**4**	4	4	6	2	2	5	1	**3**		

==== GT Le Mans ====
Pos.	Manufacturer	**DAY**	**SEB**	LBH	AUS	**WGL**	MOS	LIM	ELK	VIR	LGA	**ATL**	Points	NAEC
1	Chevrolet	4	1	**1**	1	3	4	4	4	1	4	2	348	37
2	BMW	8	6	4	**2**	1	1	2	6	4	1	1	342	37
3	Ford	**1**	**2**	2	5	**2**	3	5	**1**	**2**	5	7	338	45
4	Porsche	2	7	3	4	6	**6**	**1**	2	7	3	5	325	44
5	Ferrari	3	3	9	9					3	**2**	**3**	204	19

==== GT Daytona ====
Pos.	Manufacturer	**DAY**	**SEB**	LBH	AUS	BEL	**WGL**	MOS	LIM	ELK	VIR	LGA	**ATL**	Points	NAEC
1	Ferrari	**16**	2	3	2	2	2	3	6	5	4	1	**9**	352	36
2	Mercedes-AMG	3	**1**	1	1	12	4	7	10	4	3	8	4	348	44
3	Porsche	1	6	4	**7**	8	7	9	1	2	6	3	2	345	30
4	Acura	5	8	7	11	1	**1**	2	5	14	14	2	12	334	39
5	Audi	2	4	13	10	**13**	9	1	4	3	12	11	1	334	38
6	Lamborghini	7	5	**8**	4	3	11	6	**2**	**6**	**1**	**7**	7	333	25
7	BMW	8	20	9	5	4	3	4	14	1	2	5	15	326	28
8	Lexus	14	13	6	9	6	5	**5**	7	8	7	13	8	301	24
9	Aston Martin	12							13					47	8
