= 2017 Michelin GT Challenge at VIR =

Sports car race

Track map of VIR

The 2017 Michelin GT Challenge at VIR was a sports car race sanctioned by the International Motor Sports Association (IMSA). The Race was held at Virginia International Raceway in Alton, Virginia on August 27, 2017. The race was the tenth round of the 2017 IMSA SportsCar Championship.

== Background ==
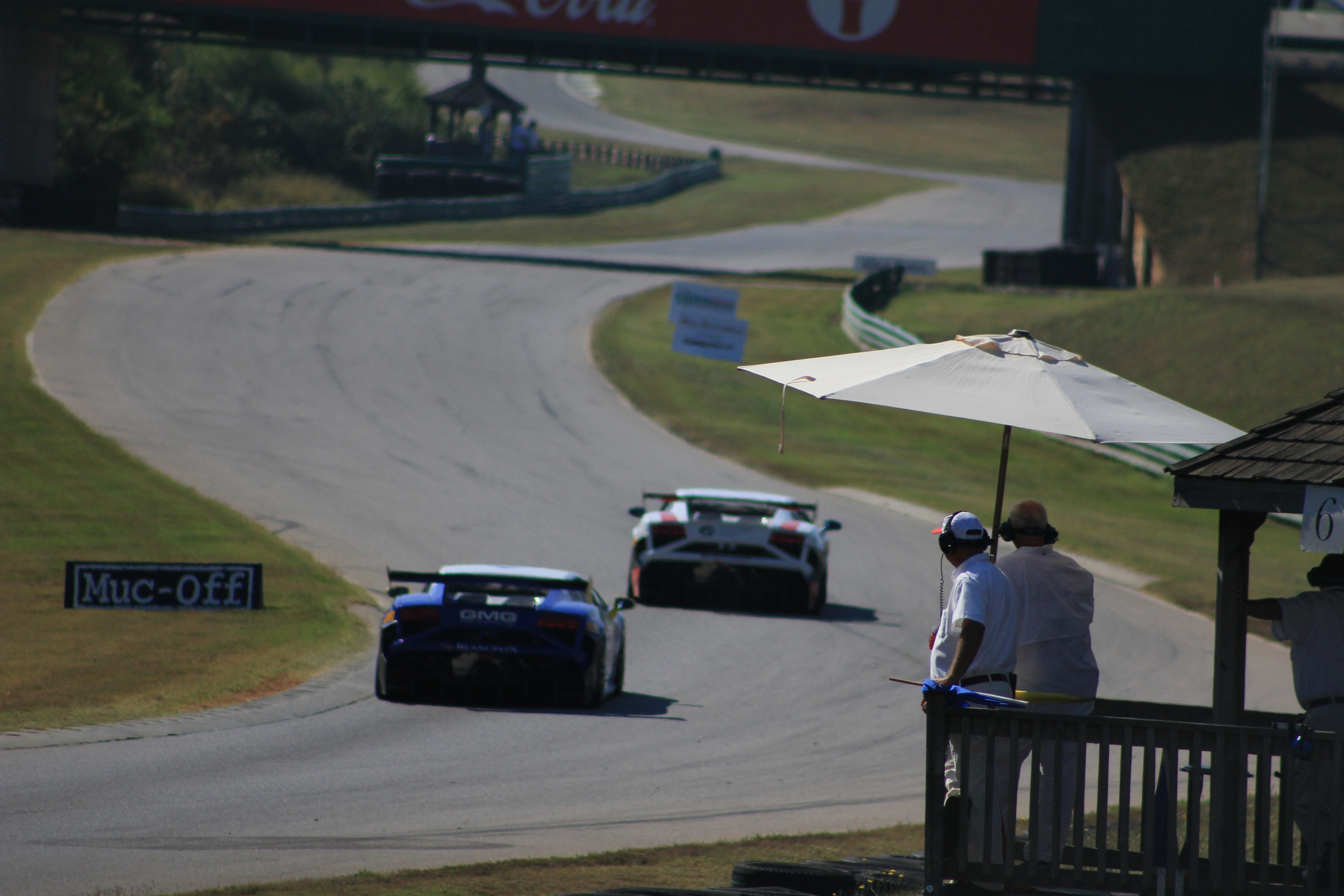
Virginia International Raceway, where the race was held.

IMSA's president Scott Atherton confirmed the Michelin GT Challenge at VIR was part of the series' schedule for the 2017 IMSA SportsCar Championship at Road America's victory lane in August 2016. It was the fourth consecutive year the event was held as part of the WeatherTech SportsCar Championship. The 2017 Michelin GT Challenge at VIR was the tenth of twelve scheduled sports car races of 2017 by IMSA, and was the seventh round not held on the held as part of the North American Endurance Cup. The race was held at the ten-turn 3.270 mi (5.263 km) Virginia International Raceway in Alton, Virginia on August 27, 2017. Much like in previous years, the event was a GT only round, in which the GTLM and GTD classes were scheduled to compete. After the Continental Tire Road Race Showcase three weeks earlier, Antonio García and Jan Magnussen led the GTLM Drivers' Championship with 239 points, ahead of Bill Auberlen and Alexander Sims with 231 points, and Joey Hand and Dirk Müller with 230 points. In GTD, the Drivers' Championship was led by Alessandro Balzan and Christina Nielsen with 254 points, ahead of Ben Keating and Jeroen Bleekemolen with 239 points. Ford and Ferrari were leading their respective Manufacturers' Championships, while Corvette Racing and Scuderia Corsa each led their own Teams' Championships.

On August 16, 2017, IMSA released the latest technical bulletin outlining Balance of performance for the event. In GTLM, the Chevrolet Corvette C7.R received a 0.5 mm larger air restrictor and an increased fuel restrictor. The BMW M6 GTLM and Ford GT received reductions in fuel capacity. In GTD, the Acura NSX GT3 received a fuel capacity reduction of 3 liters and a decreased fuel restrictor. The Audi R8 LMS received a smaller fuel restrictor while the Ferrari 488 GT3 received an increase in fuel restriction.

=== Entries ===
A total of 25 cars took part in the event split across two classes. 9 cars were in GTLM, and 16 in GTD. In GTLM, Risi Competizione returned after missing the previous four rounds. In GTD, Trent Hindman subbed for Ben Keating the #33 Riley Motorsports - Team AMG entry due to Hurricane Harvey making landfall affecting Ben's car delaerships. Lone Star Racing made their first appearance since the Circuit of the Americas round. Patrick Long returned to the Alegra Motorsports entry.

== Practice ==
There were three practice sessions preceding the start of the race on Sunday, two on Friday and one on Saturday. The first two one-hour sessions were on Friday morning and afternoon. The third on Saturday morning lasted an hour.

=== Practice 1 ===
The first practice session took place at 11:45 am ET on Friday and ended with Tommy Milner topping the charts for Corvette Racing, with a lap time of 1:42.341. Jeroen Mul set the fastest time in GTD.

Pos.	Class	No.	Team	Driver	Time	Gap
1	GTLM	4	Corvette Racing	Tommy Milner	1:42.341	_
2	GTLM	67	Ford Chip Ganassi Racing	Richard Westbrook	1:42.444	+0.103
3	GTLM	62	Risi Competizione	Giancarlo Fisichella	1:42.516	+0.175

=== Practice 2 ===
The second practice session took place at 4:10 pm ET on Friday and ended with Antonio García topping the charts for Corvette Racing, with a lap time of 1:41.323. The GTD class was topped by the #16 Change Racing Lamborghini Huracán GT3 of Jeroen Mul with a time of 1:43.830. Andy Lally was second in the #93 Michael Shank Racing with Curb-Agajanian entry and Andrew Davis rounded out the top 3.

Pos.	Class	No.	Team	Driver	Time	Gap
1	GTLM	3	Corvette Racing	Antonio García	1:41.323	_
2	GTLM	24	BMW Team RLL	John Edwards	1:41.405	+0.082
3	GTLM	66	Ford Chip Ganassi Racing	Dirk Müller	1:41.667	+0.344

=== Practice 3 ===
The third and final practice session took place at 8:45 am ET on Saturday and ended with Toni Vilander topping the charts for Risi Competizione, with a lap time of 1:40.855. The GTD class was topped by the #16 Change Racing Lamborghini Huracán GT3 of Jeroen Mul with a time of 1:43.223.

Pos.	Class	No.	Team	Driver	Time	Gap
1	GTLM	62	Risi Competizione	Toni Vilander	1:40.855	_
2	GTLM	66	Ford Chip Ganassi Racing	Dirk Müller	1:41.029	+0.174
3	GTLM	24	BMW Team RLL	John Edwards	1:41.054	+0.199

== Qualifying ==
Saturday afternoon's 40-minute two-group qualifying, each category had separate 15-minute sessions. Regulations stipulated that teams nominate one qualifying driver, with the fastest laps determining each class' starting order. IMSA then arranged the grid to put GTLMs ahead of GTD cars.

Qualifying was broken into two sessions. The first was for cars in GTD class. Jeroen Mul qualified on pole for the class driving the #16 car for Change Racing, besting Jesse Krohn in the Turner Motorsport entry.

The final session of qualifying was for the GTLM class. Joey Hand qualified on pole driving the #66 car for Ford Chip Ganassi Racing, beating Alexander Sims in the #25 BMW Team RLL entry by over two tenths of a second.

=== Qualifying results ===
Pole positions in each class are indicated in bold and by ‡.

Pos.	Class	No.	Team	Driver	Time	Gap	Grid
1	**GTLM**	**66**	**(United States) Ford Chip Ganassi Racing**	**(United States) Joey Hand**	**1:40.211**	**_**	1‡
2	GTLM	25	(United States) BMW Team RLL	(United Kingdom) Alexander Sims	1:40.415	+0.204	2
3	GTLM	24	(United States) BMW Team RLL	(United States) John Edwards	1:40.441	+0.230	3
4	GTLM	62	(United States) Risi Competizione	(Italy) Giancarlo Fisichella	1:40.606	+0.395	4
5	GTLM	4	(United States) Corvette Racing	(United States) Tommy Milner	1:40.758	+0.547	5
6	GTLM	3	(United States) Corvette Racing	(Denmark) Jan Magnussen	1:40.802	+0.591	6
7	GTLM	67	(United States) Ford Chip Ganassi Racing	(United Kingdom) Richard Westbrook	1:40.841	+0.630	7
8	GTLM	912	(United States) Porsche GT Team	(Belgium) Laurens Vanthoor	1:41.339	+1.128	8
9	GTLM	911	(United States) Porsche GT Team	(Germany) Dirk Werner	1:41.991	+1.780	9
10	**GTD**	**16**	**(United States) Change Racing**	**(Netherlands) Jeroen Mul**	**1:43.391**	**+3.180**	10‡
11	GTD	96	(United States) Turner Motorsport	(Finland) Jesse Krohn	1:43.621	+3.410	9
12	GTD	57	(United States) Stevenson Motorsports	(United States) Andrew Davis	1:43.770	+3.559	13
13	GTD	33	(United States) Riley Motorsports - Team AMG	(Netherlands) Jeroen Bleekemolen	1:43.826	+3.615	14
14	GTD	15	(United States) 3GT Racing	(United Kingdom) Jack Hawksworth	1:43.845	+3.634	15
15	GTD	14	(United States) 3GT Racing	(United States) Sage Karam	1:44.105	+3.894	15
16	GTD	48	(United States) Paul Miller Racing	(United States) Madison Snow	1:44.131	+3.920	16
17	GTD	28	(United States) Alegra Motorsports	(Canada) Daniel Morad	1:44.146	+3.935	17
18	GTD	93	(United States) Michael Shank Racing with Curb-Agajanian	(United Kingdom) Katherine Legge	1:44.441	+4.230	18
19	GTD	63	(United States) Scuderia Corsa	(Denmark) Christina Nielsen	1:44.573	+4.362	10
20	GTD	73	(United States) Park Place Motorsports	(United States) Patrick Lindsey	1:44.697	+4.486	19
21	GTD	86	(United States) Michael Shank Racing with Curb-Agajanian	(Brazil) Oswaldo Negri Jr.	1:45.080	+4.869	20
22	GTD	50	(United States) Riley Motorsports - WeatherTech Racing	(United States) Cooper MacNeil	1:45.530	+5.319	21
23	GTD	75	(United States) SunEnergy1 Racing	(Australia) Kenny Habul	1:46.011	+5.800	24^{1}
24	GTD	54	(United States) CORE Autosport	(United States) Jon Bennett	1:46.106	+5.895	23
25	GTD	80	(United States) Lone Star Racing	(United States) Dan Knox	1:46.768	+6.557	25^{2}
Sources:

- ^{1} The No. 75 SunEnergy1 Racing entry was moved to the back of the GTD field as per Article 43.6 of the Sporting regulations (Change of starting tires).
- ^{2} The No. 80 Lone Star Racing entry was moved to the back of the GTD field as per Article 43.6 of the Sporting regulations (Change of starting tires).

== Race ==
=== Post-race ===
The result kept García and Ricky Taylor atop the GTLM Drivers' Championship with 274 points, 16 points ahead of fourth-place finishers Auberlen and Sims. The result kept Balzan and Nielsen atop the GTD Drivers' Championship while Klingmann advanced from fifth to third. Chevrolet and Mercedes-AMG took the lead their respective Manufacturers' Championships while Corvette Racing, and Scuderia Corsa kept their respective advantages in the Teams' Championships with two rounds left in the season.

=== Results ===
Class winners are denoted in bold and ‡.

Final race classification
Pos	Class	No.	Team	Drivers	Chassis	Tire	Laps	Time/Retired
Pos	Class	No.	Team	Drivers	Engine	Tire	Laps	Time/Retired
1	**GTLM**	**3**	**(United States) Corvette Racing**	**(Denmark) Jan Magnussen (Spain) Antonio García**	**Chevrolet Corvette C7.R**	MI	**93**	**2:41.17.089‡**
1	**GTLM**	**3**	**(United States) Corvette Racing**	**(Denmark) Jan Magnussen (Spain) Antonio García**	**Chevrolet LT5.5 5.5 L V8**	MI	**93**	**2:41.17.089‡**
2	GTLM	67	(United States) Ford Chip Ganassi Racing	(Australia) Ryan Briscoe (United Kingdom) Richard Westbrook	Ford GT	MI	93	+12.031
2	GTLM	67	(United States) Ford Chip Ganassi Racing	(Australia) Ryan Briscoe (United Kingdom) Richard Westbrook	Ford EcoBoost 3.5 L Twin-turbo V6	MI	93	+12.031
3	GTLM	62	(United States) Risi Competizione	(Finland) Toni Vilander (Italy) Giancarlo Fisichella	Ferrari 488 GTE	MI	93	+12.649
3	GTLM	62	(United States) Risi Competizione	(Finland) Toni Vilander (Italy) Giancarlo Fisichella	Ferrari F154CB 3.9 L Turbo V8	MI	93	+12.649
4	GTLM	25	(United States) BMW Team RLL	(United States) Bill Auberlen (United Kingdom) Alexander Sims	BMW M6 GTLM	MI	93	+28.026
4	GTLM	25	(United States) BMW Team RLL	(United States) Bill Auberlen (United Kingdom) Alexander Sims	BMW 4.4 L Turbo V8	MI	93	+28.026
5	GTLM	66	(United States) Ford Chip Ganassi Racing	(Germany) Dirk Müller (United States) Joey Hand	Ford GT	MI	93	+1:08.064
5	GTLM	66	(United States) Ford Chip Ganassi Racing	(Germany) Dirk Müller (United States) Joey Hand	Ford EcoBoost 3.5 L Twin-turbo V6	MI	93	+1:08.064
6	GTLM	4	(United States) Corvette Racing	(United Kingdom) Oliver Gavin (United States) Tommy Milner	Chevrolet Corvette C7.R	MI	93	+1:39.084
6	GTLM	4	(United States) Corvette Racing	(United Kingdom) Oliver Gavin (United States) Tommy Milner	Chevrolet LT5.5 5.5 L V8	MI	93	+1:39.084
7	GTLM	912	(United States) Porsche GT Team	(Italy) Gianmaria Bruni (Belgium) Laurens Vanthoor	Porsche 911 RSR	MI	92	+1 lap
7	GTLM	912	(United States) Porsche GT Team	(Italy) Gianmaria Bruni (Belgium) Laurens Vanthoor	Porsche 4.0 L Flat-6	MI	92	+1 lap
8	GTLM	911	(United States) Porsche GT Team	(France) Patrick Pilet (Germany) Dirk Werner	Porsche 911 RSR	MI	92	+1 lap
8	GTLM	911	(United States) Porsche GT Team	(France) Patrick Pilet (Germany) Dirk Werner	Porsche 4.0 L Flat-6	MI	92	+1 lap
9	**GTD**	**16**	**(United States) Change Racing**	**(United States) Corey Lewis (Netherlands) Jeroen Mul**	**Lamborghini Huracán GT3**	C	**91**	**+2 Laps‡**
9	**GTD**	**16**	**(United States) Change Racing**	**(United States) Corey Lewis (Netherlands) Jeroen Mul**	**Lamborghini 5.2 L V10**	C	**91**	**+2 Laps‡**
10	GTD	96	(United States) Turner Motorsport	(Germany) Jens Klingmann (Finland) Jesse Krohn	BMW M6 GT3	C	91	+2 Laps
10	GTD	96	(United States) Turner Motorsport	(Germany) Jens Klingmann (Finland) Jesse Krohn	BMW 4.4L Turbo V8	C	91	+2 Laps
11	GTD	33	(United States) Riley Motorsports – Team AMG	(Netherlands) Jeroen Bleekemolen (United States) Trent Hindman	Mercedes-AMG GT3	C	90	+3 Laps
11	GTD	33	(United States) Riley Motorsports – Team AMG	(Netherlands) Jeroen Bleekemolen (United States) Trent Hindman	Mercedes AMG M159 6.2 L V8	C	90	+3 Laps
12	GTD	63	(United States) Scuderia Corsa	(Denmark) Christina Nielsen (Italy) Alessandro Balzan	Ferrari 488 GT3	C	90	+3 Laps
12	GTD	63	(United States) Scuderia Corsa	(Denmark) Christina Nielsen (Italy) Alessandro Balzan	Ferrari F154CB 3.9 L Turbo V8	C	90	+3 Laps
13	GTD	48	(United States) Paul Miller Racing	(United States) Bryan Sellers (United States) Madison Snow	Lamborghini Huracán GT3	C	90	+3 Laps
13	GTD	48	(United States) Paul Miller Racing	(United States) Bryan Sellers (United States) Madison Snow	Lamborghini 5.2 L V10	C	90	+3 Laps
14	GTD	50	(United States) Riley Motorsports – WeatherTech Racing	(United States) Cooper MacNeil (United States) Gunnar Jeannette	Porsche 911 GT3 R	C	89	+4 Laps
14	GTD	50	(United States) Riley Motorsports – WeatherTech Racing	(United States) Cooper MacNeil (United States) Gunnar Jeannette	Porsche 4.0 L Flat-6	C	89	+4 Laps
15	GTD	14	(United States) 3GT Racing	(United States) Robert Alon (United States) Sage Karam	Lexus RC F GT3	C	89	+2 Laps
15	GTD	14	(United States) 3GT Racing	(United States) Robert Alon (United States) Sage Karam	Lexus 5.0L V8	C	89	+2 Laps
16	GTD	54	(United States) CORE Autosport	(United States) Jon Bennett (United States) Colin Braun	Porsche 911 GT3 R	C	89	+4 Laps
16	GTD	54	(United States) CORE Autosport	(United States) Jon Bennett (United States) Colin Braun	Porsche 4.0 L Flat-6	C	89	+4 Laps
17	GTD	28	(United States) Alegra Motorsports	(United States) Patrick Long (Canada) Daniel Morad	Porsche 911 GT3 R	C	89	+4 Laps
17	GTD	28	(United States) Alegra Motorsports	(United States) Patrick Long (Canada) Daniel Morad	Porsche 4.0 L Flat-6	C	89	+4 Laps
18	GTD	73	(United States) Park Place Motorsports	(Germany) Jörg Bergmeister (United States) Patrick Lindsey	Porsche 911 GT3 R	C	88	+5 Laps
18	GTD	73	(United States) Park Place Motorsports	(Germany) Jörg Bergmeister (United States) Patrick Lindsey	Porsche 4.0 L Flat-6	C	88	+5 Laps
19	GTD	80	(United States) Lone Star Racing	(United States) Dan Knox (United States) Mike Skeen	Mercedes-AMG GT3	C	87	+6 Laps
19	GTD	80	(United States) Lone Star Racing	(United States) Dan Knox (United States) Mike Skeen	Mercedes AMG M159 6.2 L V8	C	87	+6 Laps
20	GTD	57	(United States) Stevenson Motorsports	(United States) Andrew Davis (United States) Lawson Aschenbach	Audi R8 LMS	C	86	+7 Laps
20	GTD	57	(United States) Stevenson Motorsports	(United States) Andrew Davis (United States) Lawson Aschenbach	Audi 5.2L V10	C	86	+7 Laps
21 DNF	GTLM	24	(United States) BMW Team RLL	(United States) John Edwards (Germany) Martin Tomczyk	BMW M6 GTLM	MI	72	Steering
21 DNF	GTLM	24	(United States) BMW Team RLL	(United States) John Edwards (Germany) Martin Tomczyk	BMW 4.4 L Turbo V8	MI	72	Steering
22 DNF	GTD	15	(United States) 3GT Racing	(United States) Scott Pruett (United Kingdom) Jack Hawksworth	Lexus RC F GT3	C	71	Crash Damage
22 DNF	GTD	15	(United States) 3GT Racing	(United States) Scott Pruett (United Kingdom) Jack Hawksworth	Lexus 5.0L V8	C	71	Crash Damage
23 DNF	GTD	86	(United States) Michael Shank Racing with Curb Agajanian	(United States) Jeff Segal (Brazil) Oswaldo Negri Jr.	Acura NSX GT3	C	26	Crash Damage
23 DNF	GTD	86	(United States) Michael Shank Racing with Curb Agajanian	(United States) Jeff Segal (Brazil) Oswaldo Negri Jr.	Acura 3.5 L Turbo V6	C	26	Crash Damage
24 DNF	GTD	93	(United States) Michael Shank Racing with Curb Agajanian	(United States) Andy Lally (United Kingdom) Katherine Legge	Acura NSX GT3	C	22	Crash Damage
24 DNF	GTD	93	(United States) Michael Shank Racing with Curb Agajanian	(United States) Andy Lally (United Kingdom) Katherine Legge	Acura 3.5 L Turbo V6	C	22	Crash Damage
25 DNF	GTD	75	(United States) SunEnergy1 Racing	(France) Tristan Vautier (Australia) Kenny Habul	Mercedes-AMG GT3	C	6	Power Steering
25 DNF	GTD	75	(United States) SunEnergy1 Racing	(France) Tristan Vautier (Australia) Kenny Habul	Mercedes AMG M159 6.2 L V8	C	6	Power Steering

Tyre manufacturers
Key
Symbol	Tyre manufacturer
**C**	Continental
**MI**	Michelin

== Standings after the race ==
Prototype Drivers' Championship standings
Pos.	+/–	Driver	Points
1		(United States) Jordan Taylor (United States) Ricky Taylor	258
2		(Portugal) João Barbosa (Brazil) Christian Fittipaldi	232
3		(United States) Dane Cameron (United States) Eric Curran	227
4		(Canada) Misha Goikhberg (South Africa) Stephen Simpson	224
5		(United Kingdom) Ryan Dalziel (United States) Scott Sharp	213

PC Drivers' Championship standings
Pos.	+/–	Driver	Points
1		(United States) James French (Mexico) Patricio O'Ward	252
2		(United States) Don Yount	212
3		(United States) Buddy Rice	150
4		(Colombia) Gustavo Yacamán	121
5		(United States) Kyle Masson	108

GTLM Drivers' Championship standings
Pos.	+/–	Driver	Points
1		(Spain) Antonio García (Denmark) Jan Magnussen	274
2	1	(United States) Bill Auberlen (United Kingdom) Alexander Sims	258
3	1	(United States) Joey Hand (Germany) Dirk Müller	257
4		(Australia) Ryan Briscoe (United Kingdom) Richard Westbrook	257
5		(France) Patrick Pilet (Germany) Dirk Werner	240

GTD Drivers' Championship standings
Pos.	+/–	Driver	Points
1		(Italy) Alessandro Balzan (Denmark) Christina Nielsen	282
2		(Netherlands) Jeroen Bleekemolen	269
3	2	(Germany) Jens Klingmann	252
4	1	(United States) Lawson Aschenbach (United States) Andrew Davis	245
5	3	(United States) Ben Keating	239

- Note: Only the top five positions are included for all sets of standings.

Prototype Teams' Championship standings
Pos.	+/–	Team	Points
1		(United States) #10 Wayne Taylor Racing	258
2		(United States) #5 Mustang Sampling Racing	232
3		(United States) #31 Whelen Engineering Racing	227
4		(United States) #85 JDC-Miller MotorSports	224
5		(United States) #2 Tequila Patrón ESM	213

PC Teams' Championship standings
Pos.	+/–	Team	Points
1		(United States) #38 Performance Tech Motorsports	252
2		(United States) #26 BAR1 Motorsports	217
3		(United States) #20 BAR1 Motorsports	212
4		(United States) #8 Starworks Motorsport	58
5		(United States) #88 Starworks Motorsport	28

GTLM Teams' Championship standings
Pos.	+/–	Team	Points
1		(United States) #3 Corvette Racing	274
2	1	(United States) #25 BMW Team RLL	258
3	1	(United States) #66 Ford Chip Ganassi Racing	257
4		(United States) #67 Ford Chip Ganassi Racing	257
5		(United States) #911 Porsche GT Team	240

GTD Teams' Championship standings
Pos.	+/–	Team	Points
1		(United States) #63 Scuderia Corsa	282
2		(United States) #33 Riley Motorsports Team AMG	269
3	2	(United States) #96 Turner Motorsport	252
4	1	(United States) #57 Stevenson Motorsports	245
5	1	(United States) #73 Park Place Motorsports	238

- Note: Only the top five positions are included for all sets of standings.

Prototype Manufacturers' Championship standings
Pos.	+/–	Manufacturer	Points
1		(United States) Cadillac	277
2		(Japan) Nissan	253
3		(Japan) Mazda	216

GTLM Manufacturers' Championship standings
Pos.	+/–	Manufacturer	Points
1	1	(United States) Chevrolet	288
2	1	(United States) Ford	286
3		(Germany) BMW	272
4		(Germany) Porsche	267
5		(Italy) Ferrari	142

GTD Manufacturers' Championship standings
Pos.	+/–	Manufacturer	Points
1	1	(Germany) Mercedes-AMG	293
2	1	(Italy) Ferrari	292
3		(Germany) Porsche	283
4	2	(Italy) Lamborghini	279
5	1	(Japan) Acura	278

- Note: Only the top five positions are included for all sets of standings.

IMSA SportsCar Championship
Previous race: Continental Tire Road Race Showcase	2017 season	Next race: Monterey Grand Prix
