= 2013 Grand-Am of The Americas =

Track map of Circuit of the Americas

The 2013 Grand-Am of The Americas presented by Gainsco and Total was held on March 2, 2013, as the second race of 2013 Rolex Sports Car Series season, and the first Grand-Am race at the Circuit of the Americas.

== Entry list ==
Entry List
No.	Team	Car	Driver 1	Driver 2	Driver 3
DP
01	Chip Ganassi Racing with Felix Sabates	Riley-BMW	(United States) Scott Pruett	(Mexico) Memo Rojas	
2	Starworks Motorsport	Riley-Ford	(United Kingdom) Ryan Dalziel	(Venezuela) Alex Popow	
3	8Star Motorsports	Corvette DP	(Venezuela) Enzo Potolicchio	(France) Stéphane Sarrazin	
5	Action Express Racing	Corvette DP	(Brazil) Christian Fittipaldi	(United States) Brian Frisselle	
6	Michael Shank Racing	Riley-Ford	(Colombia) Gustavo Yacamán	(Brazil) Antônio Pizzonia	
8	Starworks Motorsport	Riley-Ford	(United States) Scott Mayer	(New Zealand) Brendon Hartley	
9	Action Express Racing	Corvette DP	(Portugal) João Barbosa	(United States) Burt Frisselle	
10	Wayne Taylor Racing	Corvette DP	(Italy) Max Angelelli	(United States) Jordan Taylor	
27	BTE Sport	Riley-Ford	(Canada) Emmanuel Anassis	(United States) Anthony Massari	
42	Team Sahlen	Riley-BMW	(United States) Dane Cameron	(United States) Wayne Nonnamaker	
43	Team Sahlen	Riley-BMW	(United States) Joe Nonnamaker	(United States) Will Nonnamaker	(United States) Joe Sahlen
60	Michael Shank Racing	Riley-Ford	(Brazil) Oswaldo Negri Jr.	(United States) John Pew	
76	Krohn Racing	Lola-Ford	(Sweden) Nic Jönsson	(United States) Tracy Krohn	
77	Doran Racing	Dallara-Ford	(United States) Jon Bennett	(United States) Colin Braun	
90	Spirit of Daytona Racing	Corvette DP	(United States) Ricky Taylor	(United Kingdom) Richard Westbrook	
99	GAINSCO/Bob Stallings Racing	Corvette DP	(United States) Jon Fogarty	(United States) Alex Gurney	
GT
03	Extreme Speed Motorsports	Ferrari 458 Italia Grand-Am	(United States) Mike Hedlund	(United States) Johannes van Overbeek	
18	Mühlner Motorsports America	Porsche 911 GT3 Cup	(South Africa) Dion von Moltke	(Canada) Kyle Marcelli	
19	Mühlner Motorsports America	Porsche 911 GT3 Cup	(Chile) Eduardo Costabal	(Chile) Eliseo Salazar	
31	Marsh Racing	Chevrolet Corvette	(United States) Eric Curran	(United States) Boris Said	
44	Magnus Racing	Porsche 911 GT3 Cup	(United States) John Potter	(United States) Andy Lally	
52	APR Motorsport LTD.UK	Audi R8 Grand-Am	(United States) Ian Baas	(United States) Matt Bell	
57	Stevenson Motorsports	Chevrolet Camaro GT.R	(United States) John Edwards	(Scotland) Robin Liddell	
59	Brumos Racing	Porsche 911 GT3 Cup	(United States) Andrew Davis	(United States) Leh Keen	
61	R.Ferri/AIM Motorsport Racing with Ferrari	Ferrari 458 Italia Grand-Am	(Italy) Max Papis	(United States) Jeff Segal	
63	Scuderia Corsa Michelotto	Ferrari 458 Italia Grand-Am	(Italy) Alessandro Balzan	(Italy) Alessandro Pier Guidi	
69	AIM Autosport Team FXDD with Ferrari	Ferrari 458 Italia Grand-Am	(United States) Emil Assentato	(United States) Anthony Lazzaro	
71	Park Place Motorsports	Porsche 911 GT3 Cup	(United States) Chuck Cole	(United States) Jason Hart	(United States) John McCutchen
72	Park Place Motorsports	Porsche 911 GT3 Cup	(United States) Mike Vess	(United States) Mike Skeen	
73	Park Place Motorsports	Porsche 911 GT3 Cup	(United States) Patrick Lindsey	(United States) Patrick Long	
93	Turner Motorsports	BMW M3	(United States) Michael Marsal	(United States) Gunter Schaldach	
94	Turner Motorsports	BMW M3	(United States) Bill Auberlen	(Canada) Paul Dalla Lana	
GX
00	Visit Florida Racing/Speedsource	Mazda6 GX	(United States) Joel Miller	(United States) Tristan Nunez	
38	BGB Motorsports	Porsche Cayman GX.R	(United States) Jeff Mosing	(United States) Jim Norman	(United States) Spencer Pumpelly
70	Mazdaspeed/Speedsource	Mazda6 GX	(United States) Tom Long	(Canada) Sylvain Tremblay	

== Qualifying ==
=== Qualifying Results ===
Pole positions in each class are denoted in bold.

Pos	Class	No.	Team	Car	Qualifying	Grid
1	**DP**	**99**	**GAINSCO/Bob Stallings Racing**	**Corvette DP**	**2:00.179**	**1**
2	DP	10	Wayne Taylor Racing	Corvette DP	2:00.239	2
3	DP	01	Chip Ganassi Racing with Felix Sabates	Riley / BMW	2:00.289	3
4	DP	9	Action Express Racing	Corvette DP	2:01.127	4
5	DP	90	Spirit of Daytona Racing	Corvette DP	2:01.436	5
6	DP	6	Michael Shank Racing	Riley / Ford	2:01.624	6
7	DP	2	Starworks Motorsport	Riley / Ford	2:01.737	4
8	DP	5	Action Express Racing	Corvette DP	2:02.300	8
9	DP	3	8 Star Motorsports	Corvette DP	2:02.522	9
10	DP	42	Team Sahlen	Riley / BMW	2:03.229	10
11	DP	60	Michael Shank Racing	Riley / Ford	2:03.339	11
12	DP	76	Krohn Racing	Lola-Ford	2:03.943	12
13	DP	77	Doran Racing	Dallara / Ford	2:05.673	13
14	DP	27	BTE Sport	Riley / Ford	2:07.227	14
15	**GT**	**63**	**Scuderia Corsa Michelotto**	**Ferrari 458 Italia Grand-Am**	**2:08.846**	**15**
16	GT	61	R. Ferri/AIM Motorsport Racing with Ferrari	Ferrari 458 Italia Grand-Am	2:09.205	16
17	GT	59	Brumos Racing	Porsche 911 GT3 Cup	2:10.173	17
18	GT	57	Stevenson Motorsports	Chevrolet Camaro GT.R	2:10.615	18
19	GT	31	Marsh Racing	Chevrolet Corvette	2:10.856	19
20	GT	73	Park Place Motorsports	Porsche 911 GT3 Cup	2:10.958	20
21	GT	52	APR Motorsport LTD.UK	Audi R8 Grand-Am	2:11.035	21
22	GT	44	Magnus Racing	Porsche 911 GT3 Cup	2:11.517	22
23	DP	43	Team Sahlen	Riley / BMW	2:11.682	23
24	GT	03	Extreme Speed Motorsports	Ferrari 458 Italia Grand-Am	2:11.820	24
25	GT	93	Turner Motorsport	BMW M3	2:12.084	25
26	GT	94	Turner Motorsport	BMW M3	2:12.486	26
27	GT	18	Mühlner Motorsports America	Porsche 911 GT3 Cup	2:12.601	27
28	GT	19	Mühlner Motorsports America	Porsche 911 GT3 Cup	2:18.746	28
29	GT	71	Park Place Motorsports	Porsche 911 GT3 Cup	2:18.958	29
30	**GX**	**38**	**BGB Motorsports**	**Porsche Cayman GX.R**	**2:21.682**	**30**
31	GX	00	Visit Florida Racing/Speedsource	Mazda6 GX	2:22.117	31
32	GT	72	Park Place Motorsports	Porsche 911 GT3 Cup	2:23.140	32
33	DP	8	Starworks Motorsport	Riley / Ford	No time	33
34	GT	69	AIM Autosport Team FXDD with Ferrari	Ferrari 458 Italia Grand-Am	No time	34
35	GX	70	Mazdaspeed/Speedsource	Mazda6 GX	No time	35

== Race ==
=== Race results ===
Winners in each class are denoted in bold.

Pos.	Class	No.	Team	Drivers	Chassis	Laps
Pos.	Class	No.	Team	Drivers	Engine	Laps
1	**DP**	**99**	**(United States) GAINSCO/Bob Stallings Racing**	**(United States) Jon Fogarty** **(United States) Alex Gurney**	**Corvette DP (Riley XXVI)**	**71**
1	**DP**	**99**	**(United States) GAINSCO/Bob Stallings Racing**	**(United States) Jon Fogarty** **(United States) Alex Gurney**	**Chevrolet 5.0L V8**	**71**
2	DP	2	(United States) Starworks Motorsport	(Scotland) Ryan Dalziel (Venezuela) Alex Popow	Riley Mk. XXVI	71
2	DP	2	(United States) Starworks Motorsport	(Scotland) Ryan Dalziel (Venezuela) Alex Popow	Ford 5.0L V8	71
3	DP	01	(United States) Chip Ganassi Racing with Felix Sabates	(United States) Scott Pruett (Mexico) Memo Rojas	Riley Mk. XXVI	71
3	DP	01	(United States) Chip Ganassi Racing with Felix Sabates	(United States) Scott Pruett (Mexico) Memo Rojas	BMW 5.0L V8	71
4	DP	3	(United States) 8 Star Motorsports	(Venezuela) Enzo Potolicchio (France) Stéphane Sarrazin	Corvette DP (Coyote)	71
4	DP	3	(United States) 8 Star Motorsports	(Venezuela) Enzo Potolicchio (France) Stéphane Sarrazin	Chevrolet 5.0L V8	71
5	DP	5	(United States) Action Express Racing	(Brazil) Christian Fittipaldi (United States) Brian Frisselle	Corvette DP (Coyote)	71
5	DP	5	(United States) Action Express Racing	(Brazil) Christian Fittipaldi (United States) Brian Frisselle	Chevrolet 5.0L V8	71
6	DP	76	(United States) Krohn Racing	(Sweden) Nic Jönsson (United States) Tracy Krohn	Proto-Auto Lola B08/70	71
6	DP	76	(United States) Krohn Racing	(Sweden) Nic Jönsson (United States) Tracy Krohn	Ford 5.0L V8	71
7	DP	6	(United States) Michael Shank Racing	(Brazil) Antonio Pizzonia (Colombia) Gustavo Yacamán	Riley Mk. XXVI	71
7	DP	6	(United States) Michael Shank Racing	(Brazil) Antonio Pizzonia (Colombia) Gustavo Yacamán	Ford 5.0L V8	71
8	DP	42	(United States) Team Sahlen	(United States) Dane Cameron (United States) Wayne Nonnamaker	Riley Mk. XXVI	71
8	DP	42	(United States) Team Sahlen	(United States) Dane Cameron (United States) Wayne Nonnamaker	BMW 5.0L V8	71
9	DP	77	(United States) Doran Racing	(United States) Jon Bennett (United States) Colin Braun	Dallara (Riley Mk. XXVI)	71
9	DP	77	(United States) Doran Racing	(United States) Jon Bennett (United States) Colin Braun	Ford 5.0L V8	71
10	DP	10	(United States) Wayne Taylor Racing	(Italy) Max Angelelli (United States) Jordan Taylor	Corvette DP (Dallara)	71
10	DP	10	(United States) Wayne Taylor Racing	(Italy) Max Angelelli (United States) Jordan Taylor	Chevrolet 5.0L V8	71
11	DP	90	(United States) Spirit of Daytona Racing	(United States) Ricky Taylor (United Kingdom) Richard Westbrook	Corvette DP (Coyote)	70
11	DP	90	(United States) Spirit of Daytona Racing	(United States) Ricky Taylor (United Kingdom) Richard Westbrook	Chevrolet 5.0L V8	70
12	DP	27	(United States) BTE Sport	(Canada) Emmanuel Anassis (United States) Anthony Massari	Riley Mk. XX	70
12	DP	27	(United States) BTE Sport	(Canada) Emmanuel Anassis (United States) Anthony Massari	Ford 5.0L V8	70
13	**GT**	**94**	**(United States) Turner Motorsport**	**(United States) Bill Auberlen** **(Canada) Paul Dalla Lana**	**BMW M3**	**67**
13	**GT**	**94**	**(United States) Turner Motorsport**	**(United States) Bill Auberlen** **(Canada) Paul Dalla Lana**	**BMW 5.0L V8**	**67**
14	GT	44	(United States) Magnus Racing	(United States) Andy Lally (United States) John Potter	Porsche 911 GT3 Cup	67
14	GT	44	(United States) Magnus Racing	(United States) Andy Lally (United States) John Potter	Porsche 4.0L F6	67
15	GT	59	(United States) Brumos Racing	(United States) Andrew Davis (United States) Leh Keen	Porsche 911 GT3 Cup	67
15	GT	59	(United States) Brumos Racing	(United States) Andrew Davis (United States) Leh Keen	Porsche 4.0L F6	67
16	GT	73	(United States) Park Place Motorsports	(United States) Patrick Lindsey (United States) Patrick Long	Porsche 911 GT3 Cup	67
16	GT	73	(United States) Park Place Motorsports	(United States) Patrick Lindsey (United States) Patrick Long	Porsche 4.0L F6	67
17	GT	69	(United States) AIM Autosport Team FXDD with Ferrari	(United States) Emil Assentato (United States) Anthony Lazzaro	Ferrari 458 Italia Grand-Am	67
17	GT	69	(United States) AIM Autosport Team FXDD with Ferrari	(United States) Emil Assentato (United States) Anthony Lazzaro	Ferrari 4.5L V8	67
18	GT	72	(United States) Park Place Motorsports	(United States) Mike Skeen (United States) Mike Vess	Porsche 911 GT3 Cup	67
18	GT	72	(United States) Park Place Motorsports	(United States) Mike Skeen (United States) Mike Vess	Porsche 4.0L F6	67
19	GT	03	(United States) Extreme Speed Motorsports	(United States) Mike Hedlund (United States) Johannes van Overbeek	Ferrari 458 Italia Grand-Am	67
19	GT	03	(United States) Extreme Speed Motorsports	(United States) Mike Hedlund (United States) Johannes van Overbeek	Ferrari 4.5L V8	67
20	GT	93	(United States) Turner Motorsport	(United States) Michael Marsal (Canada) Gunter Schaldach	BMW M3	67
20	GT	93	(United States) Turner Motorsport	(United States) Michael Marsal (Canada) Gunter Schaldach	BMW 5.0L V8	67
21	GT	18	(Belgium) Mühlner Motorsports America	(South Africa) Dion von Moltke (Canada) Kyle Marcelli	Porsche 911 GT3 Cup	67
21	GT	18	(Belgium) Mühlner Motorsports America	(South Africa) Dion von Moltke (Canada) Kyle Marcelli	Porsche 4.0L F6	67
22	GT	61	(United States) R. Ferri/AIM Motorsport Racing with Ferrari	(Italy) Max Papis (United States) Jeff Segal	Ferrari 458 Italia Grand-Am	67
22	GT	61	(United States) R. Ferri/AIM Motorsport Racing with Ferrari	(Italy) Max Papis (United States) Jeff Segal	Ferrari 4.5L V8	67
23	GT	63	(United States) Scuderia Corsa Michelotto	(Italy) Alessandro Balzan (Italy) Alessandro Pier Guidi	Ferrari 458 Italia Grand-Am	67
23	GT	63	(United States) Scuderia Corsa Michelotto	(Italy) Alessandro Balzan (Italy) Alessandro Pier Guidi	Ferrari 4.5L V8	67
24	GT	71	(United States) Park Place Motorsports	(United States) Chuck Cole (United States) Jason Hart (United States) John McCutchen	Porsche 911 GT3 Cup	66
24	GT	71	(United States) Park Place Motorsports	(United States) Chuck Cole (United States) Jason Hart (United States) John McCutchen	Porsche 4.0L F6	66
25	GT	31	(United States) Marsh Racing	(United States) Eric Curran (United States) Boris Said	Chevrolet Corvette	65
25	GT	31	(United States) Marsh Racing	(United States) Eric Curran (United States) Boris Said	Chevrolet 6.2L V8	65
26	GT	19	(Belgium) Mühlner Motorsports America	(Chile) Eduardo Costabal (Chile) Eliseo Salazar	Porsche 911 GT3 Cup	65
26	GT	19	(Belgium) Mühlner Motorsports America	(Chile) Eduardo Costabal (Chile) Eliseo Salazar	Porsche 4.0L F6	65
27 DNF	DP	8	(United States) Starworks Motorsport	(New Zealand) Brendon Hartley (United States) Scott Mayer	Riley Mk. XXVI	63
27 DNF	DP	8	(United States) Starworks Motorsport	(New Zealand) Brendon Hartley (United States) Scott Mayer	Ford 5.0L V8	63
28	GT	57	(United States) Stevenson Motorsports	(United States) John Edwards (Scotland) Robin Liddell (United States) Lawson Aschenbach	Chevrolet Camaro GT.R	63
28	GT	57	(United States) Stevenson Motorsports	(United States) John Edwards (Scotland) Robin Liddell (United States) Lawson Aschenbach	Chevrolet 6.2L V8	63
29	DP	9	(United States) Action Express Racing	(Portugal) João Barbosa (United States) Burt Frisselle	Corvette DP (Coyote)	62
29	DP	9	(United States) Action Express Racing	(Portugal) João Barbosa (United States) Burt Frisselle	Chevrolet 5.0L V8	62
30	**GX**	**38**	**(United States) BGB Motorsports**	**(United States) Jeff Mosing** **(United States) Jim Norman** **(United States) Spencer Pumpelly**	**Porsche Cayman GX.R**	**62**
30	**GX**	**38**	**(United States) BGB Motorsports**	**(United States) Jeff Mosing** **(United States) Jim Norman** **(United States) Spencer Pumpelly**	**Porsche 3.8L F6**	**62**
31 DNF	GT	52	(United Kingdom) APR Motorsport LTD. UK	(United States) Ian Baas (United States) Matt Bell	Audi R8	60
31 DNF	GT	52	(United Kingdom) APR Motorsport LTD. UK	(United States) Ian Baas (United States) Matt Bell	Audi 5.2L V10	60
32	GX	70	(United States) Mazdaspeed/Speedsource	(United States) Tom Long (Canada) Sylvain Tremblay	Mazda6 GX	58
32	GX	70	(United States) Mazdaspeed/Speedsource	(United States) Tom Long (Canada) Sylvain Tremblay	Mazda 2.2L I4 Diesel	58
33	DP	43	(United States) Team Sahlen	(United States) Joe Nonnamaker (United States) Will Nonnamaker (United States) Joe Sahlen	Riley Mk. XXVI	52
33	DP	43	(United States) Team Sahlen	(United States) Joe Nonnamaker (United States) Will Nonnamaker (United States) Joe Sahlen	BMW 5.0L V8	52
34 DNF	DP	60	(United States) Michael Shank Racing	(Brazil) Oswaldo Negri Jr. (United States) John Pew	Riley Mk. XXVI	49
34 DNF	DP	60	(United States) Michael Shank Racing	(Brazil) Oswaldo Negri Jr. (United States) John Pew	Ford 5.0L V8	49
35 DNF	GX	00	(United States) Visit Florida Racing/Speedsource	(United States) Joel Miller (United States) Tristan Nunez	Mazda6 GX	39
35 DNF	GX	00	(United States) Visit Florida Racing/Speedsource	(United States) Joel Miller (United States) Tristan Nunez	Mazda 2.2L I4 Diesel	39

Preceded by 2013 24 Hours of Daytona	Rolex Sports Car Series; 2013	Succeeded by 2013 Porsche 250
