= 2013 Porsche 250 =

Track map of Barber Motorsports Park

The 2013 Porsche 250 was the third race of 2013 Rolex Sports Car Series season. It took place at Barber Motorsports Park on April 6, 2013.

== Entry list ==
Entry List
No.	Team	Car	Driver 1	Driver 2
DP
01	Chip Ganassi Racing with Felix Sabates	Riley-BMW	(United States) Scott Pruett	(Mexico) Memo Rojas
2	Starworks Motorsport	Riley-Ford	(United Kingdom) Ryan Dalziel	(Venezuela) Alex Popow
3	8Star Motorsports	Corvette DP	(Venezuela) Enzo Potolicchio	(France) Stéphane Sarrazin
5	Action Express Racing	Corvette DP	(Brazil) Christian Fittipaldi	(United States) Brian Frisselle
6	Michael Shank Racing	Riley-Ford	(Colombia) Gustavo Yacamán	(Brazil) Antônio Pizzonia
8	Starworks Motorsport	Riley-Ford	(United States) Scott Mayer	(New Zealand) Brendon Hartley
9	Action Express Racing	Corvette DP	(Portugal) João Barbosa	(United States) Burt Frisselle
10	Wayne Taylor Racing	Corvette DP	(Italy) Max Angelelli	(United States) Jordan Taylor
42	Team Sahlen	Riley-BMW	(United States) Dane Cameron	(United States) Wayne Nonnamaker
43	Team Sahlen	Riley-BMW	(United States) Joe Nonnamaker	(United States) Will Nonnamaker
60	Michael Shank Racing	Riley-Ford	(Brazil) Oswaldo Negri Jr.	(United States) John Pew
90	Spirit of Daytona Racing	Corvette DP	(United States) Ricky Taylor	(United Kingdom) Richard Westbrook
99	GAINSCO/Bob Stallings Racing	Corvette DP	(United States) Jon Fogarty	(United States) Alex Gurney
GT
18	Mühlner Motorsports America	Porsche 911 GT3 Cup	(South Africa) Dion von Moltke	(Chile) Eduardo Costabal
31	Marsh Racing	Chevrolet Corvette	(United States) Eric Curran	(United States) Boris Said
44	Magnus Racing	Porsche 911 GT3 Cup	(United States) John Potter	(United States) Andy Lally
57	Stevenson Motorsports	Chevrolet Camaro GT.R	(United States) John Edwards	(Scotland) Robin Liddell
59	Brumos Racing	Porsche 911 GT3 Cup	(United States) Andrew Davis	(United States) Leh Keen
61	R.Ferri/AIM Motorsport Racing with Ferrari	Ferrari 458 Italia Grand-Am	(Italy) Max Papis	(United States) Jeff Segal
63	Scuderia Corsa Michelotto	Ferrari 458 Italia Grand-Am	(Italy) Alessandro Balzan	(United States) Jeff Westphal
69	AIM Autosport Team FXDD with Ferrari	Ferrari 458 Italia Grand-Am	(United States) Emil Assentato	(United States) Anthony Lazzaro
72	Park Place Motorsports	Porsche 911 GT3 Cup	(United States) Mike Vess	(United States) Mike Skeen
73	Park Place Motorsports	Porsche 911 GT3 Cup	(United States) Patrick Lindsey	(United States) Patrick Long
93	Turner Motorsports	BMW M3	(United States) Michael Marsal	(United States) Gunter Schaldach
94	Turner Motorsports	BMW M3	(United States) Bill Auberlen	(Canada) Paul Dalla Lana
GX
00	Visit Florida Racing/Speedsource	Mazda6 GX	(United States) Joel Miller	(United States) Tristan Nunez
38	BGB Motorsports	Porsche Cayman GX.R	(United States) Jim Norman	(United States) Spencer Pumpelly
70	Mazdaspeed/Speedsource	Mazda6 GX	(United States) Tom Long	(Canada) Sylvain Tremblay

== Qualifying ==
=== Qualifying Results ===
Pole positions in each class are denoted in bold.

Pos	Class	No.	Team	Car	Qualifying	Grid
1	**DP**	**99**	**GAINSCO/Bob Stallings Racing**	**Corvette DP**	**1:18.949**	**1**
2	DP	90	Spirit of Daytona Racing	Corvette DP	1:19.141	2
3	DP	10	Wayne Taylor Racing	Corvette DP	1:19.195	3
4	DP	01	Chip Ganassi Racing with Felix Sabates	Riley / BMW	1:19.656	4
5	DP	9	Action Express Racing	Corvette DP	1:19.858	5
6	DP	6	Michael Shank Racing	Riley / Ford	1:20.105	6
7	DP	5	Action Express Racing	Corvette DP	1:20.147	7
8	DP	2	Starworks Motorsport	Riley / Ford	1:20.344	8
9	DP	3	8 Star Motorsports	Corvette DP	1:20.933	9
10	DP	42	Team Sahlen	Riley / BMW	1:21.081	10
11	DP	43	Team Sahlen	Riley / BMW	1:25.424	11
12	**GT**	**57**	**Stevenson Motorsports**	**Chevrolet Camaro GT.R**	**1:26.610**	**12**
13	GT	31	Marsh Racing	Chevrolet Corvette	1:26.677	13
14	GT	73	Park Place Motorsports	Porsche 911 GT3 Cup	1:27.568	14
15	GT	63	Scuderia Corsa Michelotto	Ferrari 458 Italia Grand-Am	1:28.037	15
16	GT	94	Turner Motorsport	BMW M3	1:28.182	16
17	GT	44	Magnus Racing	Porsche 911 GT3 Cup	1:28.337	17
18	GT	61	R. Ferri/AIM Motorsport Racing with Ferrari	Ferrari 458 Italia Grand-Am	1:28.589	18
19	GT	69	AIM Autosport Team FXDD with Ferrari	Ferrari 458 Italia Grand-Am	1:28.601	19
20	GT	93	Turner Motorsport	BMW M3	1:29.203	20
21	GT	18	Mühlner Motorsports America	Porsche 911 GT3 Cup	1:31.425	21
22	**GX**	**70**	**Mazdaspeed/Speedsource**	**Mazda6 GX**	**1:32.036**	**22**
23	GX	00	Visit Florida Racing/Speedsource	Mazda6 GX	1:32.912	23
24	GX	38	BGB Motorsports	Porsche Cayman GX.R	1:36.411	24
25	GT	72	Park Place Motorsports	Porsche 911 GT3 Cup	1:37.054	25
26	GT	59	Brumos Racing	Porsche 911 GT3 Cup	No time	26
27	DP	8	Starworks Motorsport	Riley / Ford	No time	27
28	DP	60	Michael Shank Racing	Riley / Ford	No time	28

== Race ==
=== Race results ===
Winners in each class are denoted in bold.

Pos.	Class	No.	Team	Drivers	Chassis	Laps
Pos.	Class	No.	Team	Drivers	Engine	Laps
1	**DP**	**10**	**(United States) Wayne Taylor Racing**	**(Italy) Max Angelelli** **(United States) Jordan Taylor**	**Corvette DP (Dallara)**	**84**
1	**DP**	**10**	**(United States) Wayne Taylor Racing**	**(Italy) Max Angelelli** **(United States) Jordan Taylor**	**Chevrolet 5.0L V8**	**84**
2	DP	99	(United States) GAINSCO/Bob Stallings Racing	(United States) Jon Fogarty (United States) Alex Gurney	Corvette DP (Riley XXVI)	84
2	DP	99	(United States) GAINSCO/Bob Stallings Racing	(United States) Jon Fogarty (United States) Alex Gurney	Chevrolet 5.0L V8	84
3	DP	90	(United States) Spirit of Daytona Racing	(United States) Ricky Taylor (United Kingdom) Richard Westbrook	Corvette DP (Coyote)	84
3	DP	90	(United States) Spirit of Daytona Racing	(United States) Ricky Taylor (United Kingdom) Richard Westbrook	Chevrolet 5.0L V8	84
4	DP	01	(United States) Chip Ganassi Racing with Felix Sabates	(United States) Scott Pruett (Mexico) Memo Rojas	Riley Mk. XXVI	84
4	DP	01	(United States) Chip Ganassi Racing with Felix Sabates	(United States) Scott Pruett (Mexico) Memo Rojas	BMW 5.0L V8	84
5	DP	6	(United States) Michael Shank Racing	(Brazil) Antonio Pizzonia (Colombia) Gustavo Yacamán	Riley Mk. XXVI	84
5	DP	6	(United States) Michael Shank Racing	(Brazil) Antonio Pizzonia (Colombia) Gustavo Yacamán	Ford 5.0L V8	84
6	DP	2	(United States) Starworks Motorsport	(Scotland) Ryan Dalziel (Venezuela) Alex Popow	Riley Mk. XXVI	84
6	DP	2	(United States) Starworks Motorsport	(Scotland) Ryan Dalziel (Venezuela) Alex Popow	Ford 5.0L V8	84
7	DP	42	(United States) Team Sahlen	(United States) Dane Cameron (United States) Wayne Nonnamaker	Riley Mk. XXVI	84
7	DP	42	(United States) Team Sahlen	(United States) Dane Cameron (United States) Wayne Nonnamaker	BMW 5.0L V8	84
8	DP	60	(United States) Michael Shank Racing	(Brazil) Oswaldo Negri Jr. (United States) John Pew	Riley Mk. XXVI	84
8	DP	60	(United States) Michael Shank Racing	(Brazil) Oswaldo Negri Jr. (United States) John Pew	Ford 5.0L V8	84
9	DP	9	(United States) Action Express Racing	(Portugal) João Barbosa (United States) Burt Frisselle	Corvette DP (Coyote)	84
9	DP	9	(United States) Action Express Racing	(Portugal) João Barbosa (United States) Burt Frisselle	Chevrolet 5.0L V8	84
10	DP	3	(United States) 8 Star Motorsports	(Venezuela) Enzo Potolicchio (France) Stéphane Sarrazin	Corvette DP (Coyote)	84
10	DP	3	(United States) 8 Star Motorsports	(Venezuela) Enzo Potolicchio (France) Stéphane Sarrazin	Chevrolet 5.0L V8	84
11	DP	5	(United States) Action Express Racing	(Brazil) Christian Fittipaldi (United States) Brian Frisselle	Corvette DP (Coyote)	84
11	DP	5	(United States) Action Express Racing	(Brazil) Christian Fittipaldi (United States) Brian Frisselle	Chevrolet 5.0L V8	84
12	DP	8	(United States) Starworks Motorsport	(New Zealand) Brendon Hartley (United States) Scott Mayer	Riley Mk. XXVI	82
12	DP	8	(United States) Starworks Motorsport	(New Zealand) Brendon Hartley (United States) Scott Mayer	Ford 5.0L V8	82
13	DP	43	(United States) Team Sahlen	(United States) Joe Nonnamaker (United States) Will Nonnamaker	Riley Mk. XXVI	79
13	DP	43	(United States) Team Sahlen	(United States) Joe Nonnamaker (United States) Will Nonnamaker	BMW 5.0L V8	79
14	**GT**	**57**	**(United States) Stevenson Motorsports**	**(United States) John Edwards** **(Scotland) Robin Liddell**	**Chevrolet Camaro GT.R**	**78**
14	**GT**	**57**	**(United States) Stevenson Motorsports**	**(United States) John Edwards** **(Scotland) Robin Liddell**	**Chevrolet 6.2L V8**	**78**
15	GT	63	(United States) Scuderia Corsa Michelotto	(Italy) Alessandro Balzan (United States) Jeff Westphal	Ferrari 458 Italia Grand-Am	78
15	GT	63	(United States) Scuderia Corsa Michelotto	(Italy) Alessandro Balzan (United States) Jeff Westphal	Ferrari 4.5L V8	78
16	GT	31	(United States) Marsh Racing	(United States) Eric Curran (United States) Boris Said	Chevrolet Corvette	78
16	GT	31	(United States) Marsh Racing	(United States) Eric Curran (United States) Boris Said	Chevrolet 6.2L V8	78
17	GT	61	(United States) R. Ferri/AIM Motorsport Racing with Ferrari	(Italy) Max Papis (United States) Jeff Segal	Ferrari 458 Italia Grand-Am	78
17	GT	61	(United States) R. Ferri/AIM Motorsport Racing with Ferrari	(Italy) Max Papis (United States) Jeff Segal	Ferrari 4.5L V8	78
18	GT	94	(United States) Turner Motorsport	(United States) Bill Auberlen (Canada) Paul Dalla Lana	BMW M3	78
18	GT	94	(United States) Turner Motorsport	(United States) Bill Auberlen (Canada) Paul Dalla Lana	BMW 5.0L V8	78
19	GT	44	(United States) Magnus Racing	(United States) Andy Lally (United States) John Potter	Porsche 911 GT3 Cup	78
19	GT	44	(United States) Magnus Racing	(United States) Andy Lally (United States) John Potter	Porsche 4.0L F6	78
20	GT	18	(Belgium) Mühlner Motorsports America	(South Africa) Dion von Moltke (Canada) Kyle Marcelli	Porsche 911 GT3 Cup	77
20	GT	18	(Belgium) Mühlner Motorsports America	(South Africa) Dion von Moltke (Canada) Kyle Marcelli	Porsche 4.0L F6	77
21	GT	73	(United States) Park Place Motorsports	(United States) Patrick Lindsey (United States) Patrick Long	Porsche 911 GT3 Cup	77
21	GT	73	(United States) Park Place Motorsports	(United States) Patrick Lindsey (United States) Patrick Long	Porsche 4.0L F6	77
22	GT	69	(United States) AIM Autosport Team FXDD with Ferrari	(United States) Emil Assentato (United States) Anthony Lazzaro	Ferrari 458 Italia Grand-Am	77
22	GT	69	(United States) AIM Autosport Team FXDD with Ferrari	(United States) Emil Assentato (United States) Anthony Lazzaro	Ferrari 4.5L V8	77
23	GT	59	(United States) Brumos Racing	(United States) Andrew Davis (United States) Leh Keen	Porsche 911 GT3 Cup	77
23	GT	59	(United States) Brumos Racing	(United States) Andrew Davis (United States) Leh Keen	Porsche 4.0L F6	77
24	GT	72	(United States) Park Place Motorsports	(United States) Mike Skeen (United States) Mike Vess	Porsche 911 GT3 Cup	76
24	GT	72	(United States) Park Place Motorsports	(United States) Mike Skeen (United States) Mike Vess	Porsche 4.0L F6	76
25	**GX**	**38**	**(United States) BGB Motorsports**	**(United States) Jim Norman** **(United States) Spencer Pumpelly**	**Porsche Cayman GX.R**	**74**
25	**GX**	**38**	**(United States) BGB Motorsports**	**(United States) Jim Norman** **(United States) Spencer Pumpelly**	**Porsche 3.8L F6**	**74**
26	GX	00	(United States) Visit Florida Racing/Speedsource	(United States) Joel Miller (United States) Tristan Nunez	Mazda6 GX	71
26	GX	00	(United States) Visit Florida Racing/Speedsource	(United States) Joel Miller (United States) Tristan Nunez	Mazda 2.2L I4 Diesel	71
27 DNF	GX	70	(United States) Mazdaspeed/Speedsource	(United States) Tom Long (Canada) Sylvain Tremblay	Mazda6 GX	51
27 DNF	GX	70	(United States) Mazdaspeed/Speedsource	(United States) Tom Long (Canada) Sylvain Tremblay	Mazda 2.2L I4 Diesel	51
28 DNF	GT	93	(United States) Turner Motorsport	(United States) Michael Marsal (Canada) Gunter Schaldach	BMW M3	9
28 DNF	GT	93	(United States) Turner Motorsport	(United States) Michael Marsal (Canada) Gunter Schaldach	BMW 5.0L V8	9

Preceded by 2013 Grand-Am of The Americas	Rolex Sports Car Series; 2013	Succeeded by 2013 Visual Studio Ultimate Grand Prix of Atlanta
