= 2013 Visual Studio Ultimate Grand Prix of Atlanta =

Track map of Road Atlanta

The 2013 Visual Studio Ultimate Grand Prix of Atlanta was the fourth race of 2013 Rolex Sports Car Series season. It took place at Road Atlanta on April 20, 2013.

== Entry list ==
Entry List
No.	Team	Car	Driver 1	Driver 2
DP
01	Chip Ganassi Racing with Felix Sabates	Riley-BMW	(United States) Scott Pruett	(Mexico) Memo Rojas
2	Starworks Motorsport	Riley-Ford	(United Kingdom) Ryan Dalziel	(Venezuela) Alex Popow
3	8Star Motorsports	Corvette DP	(Venezuela) Enzo Potolicchio	(France) Stéphane Sarrazin
5	Action Express Racing	Corvette DP	(Brazil) Christian Fittipaldi	(Portugal) João Barbosa
6	Michael Shank Racing	Riley-Ford	(Colombia) Gustavo Yacamán	(Brazil) Antônio Pizzonia
8	Starworks Motorsport	Riley-Ford	(United States) Scott Mayer	(New Zealand) Brendon Hartley
9	Action Express Racing	Corvette DP	(United States) Brian Frisselle	(United States) Burt Frisselle
10	Wayne Taylor Racing	Corvette DP	(Italy) Max Angelelli	(United States) Jordan Taylor
42	Team Sahlen	Riley-BMW	(United States) Dane Cameron	(United States) Wayne Nonnamaker
43	Team Sahlen	Riley-BMW	(United States) Joe Nonnamaker	(United States) Will Nonnamaker
60	Michael Shank Racing	Riley-Ford	(Canada) Michael Valiante	(United States) John Pew
90	Spirit of Daytona Racing	Corvette DP	(United States) Ricky Taylor	(United Kingdom) Richard Westbrook
99	GAINSCO/Bob Stallings Racing	Corvette DP	(United States) Jon Fogarty	(United States) Alex Gurney
GT
18	Mühlner Motorsports America	Porsche 911 GT3 Cup	(United States) Josh Hurley	(Canada) Aaron Povoledo
31	Marsh Racing	Chevrolet Corvette	(United States) Eric Curran	(United States) Boris Said
44	Magnus Racing	Porsche 911 GT3 Cup	(United States) John Potter	(United States) Andy Lally
57	Stevenson Motorsports	Chevrolet Camaro GT.R	(United States) John Edwards	(Scotland) Robin Liddell
59	Brumos Racing	Porsche 911 GT3 Cup	(United States) Andrew Davis	(United States) Leh Keen
61	R.Ferri/AIM Motorsport Racing with Ferrari	Ferrari 458 Italia Grand-Am	(Italy) Max Papis	(United States) Jeff Segal
63	Scuderia Corsa Michelotto	Ferrari 458 Italia Grand-Am	(Italy) Alessandro Balzan	(United States) Jeff Westphal
69	AIM Autosport Team FXDD with Ferrari	Ferrari 458 Italia Grand-Am	(United States) Emil Assentato	(United States) Anthony Lazzaro
71	Park Place Motorsports	Porsche 911 GT3 Cup	(United States) Jason Hart	(United States) John McCutchen
73	Park Place Motorsports	Porsche 911 GT3 Cup	(United States) Patrick Lindsey	(United States) Patrick Long
93	Turner Motorsports	BMW M3	(United States) Michael Marsal	(United States) Gunter Schaldach
94	Turner Motorsports	BMW M3	(Canada) Paul Dalla Lana	(United States) Billy Johnson
GX
00	Visit Florida Racing/Speedsource	Mazda6 GX	(United States) Joel Miller	(United States) Andrew Carbonell
38	BGB Motorsports	Porsche Cayman GX.R	(United States) Jim Norman	(United States) David Donahue
70	Mazdaspeed/Speedsource	Mazda6 GX	(United States) Tom Long	(Canada) Sylvain Tremblay

== Qualifying ==
=== Qualifying Results ===
Pole positions in each class are denoted in bold.

Pos	Class	No.	Team	Car	Qualifying	Grid
1	**DP**	**01**	**Chip Ganassi Racing with Felix Sabates**	**Riley / BMW**	**1:17.170**	**1**
2	DP	42	Team Sahlen	Riley / BMW	1:17.292	2
3	DP	5	Action Express Racing	Corvette DP	1:17.300	3
4	DP	2	Starworks Motorsport	Riley / Ford	1:17.484	4
5	DP	99	GAINSCO/Bob Stallings Racing	Corvette DP	1:17.515	5
6	DP	10	Wayne Taylor Racing	Corvette DP	1:17.527	6
7	DP	90	Spirit of Daytona Racing	Corvette DP	1:17.591	7
8	DP	60	Michael Shank Racing	Riley / Ford	1:17.659	8
9	DP	6	Michael Shank Racing	Riley / Ford	1:17.694	9
10	DP	8	Starworks Motorsport	Riley / Ford	1:17.697	10
11	DP	3	8 Star Motorsports	Corvette DP	1:17.889	11
12	DP	9	Action Express Racing	Corvette DP	1:18.312	12
13	DP	43	Team Sahlen	Riley / BMW	1:22.619	13
14	**GT**	**59**	**Brumos Racing**	**Porsche 911 GT3 Cup**	**1:23.642**	**14**
15	GT	44	Magnus Racing	Porsche 911 GT3 Cup	1:23.727	15
16	GT	73	Park Place Motorsports	Porsche 911 GT3 Cup	1:23.733	16
17	GT	94	Turner Motorsport	BMW M3	1:23.796	17
18	GT	69	AIM Autosport Team FXDD with Ferrari	Ferrari 458 Italia Grand-Am	1:24.149	18
19	GT	61	R. Ferri/AIM Motorsport Racing with Ferrari	Ferrari 458 Italia Grand-Am	1:24.198	19
20	GT	31	Marsh Racing	Chevrolet Corvette	1:24.234	20
21	GT	57	Stevenson Motorsports	Chevrolet Camaro GT.R	1:24.389	21
22	GT	63	Scuderia Corsa Michelotto	Ferrari 458 Italia Grand-Am	1:24.404	22
23	GT	93	Turner Motorsport	BMW M3	1:25.009	23
24	GT	71	Park Place Motorsports	Porsche 911 GT3 Cup	1:25.818	24
25	GT	18	Mühlner Motorsports America	Porsche 911 GT3 Cup	1:27.105	25
26	**GX**	**70**	**Mazdaspeed/Speedsource**	**Mazda6 GX**	**1:29.928**	**26**
27	GX	38	BGB Motorsports	Porsche Cayman GX.R	1:31.268	27
28	GX	00	Visit Florida Racing/Speedsource	Mazda6 GX	No time	28

== Race ==
=== Race results ===
Winners in each class are denoted in bold.

Pos.	Class	No.	Team	Drivers	Chassis	Laps
Pos.	Class	No.	Team	Drivers	Engine	Laps
1	**DP**	**01**	**(United States) Chip Ganassi Racing with Felix Sabates**	**(United States) Scott Pruett** **(Mexico) Memo Rojas**	**Riley Mk. XXVI**	**120**
1	**DP**	**01**	**(United States) Chip Ganassi Racing with Felix Sabates**	**(United States) Scott Pruett** **(Mexico) Memo Rojas**	**BMW 5.0L V8**	**120**
2	DP	2	(United States) Starworks Motorsport	(Scotland) Ryan Dalziel (Venezuela) Alex Popow	Riley Mk. XXVI	120
2	DP	2	(United States) Starworks Motorsport	(Scotland) Ryan Dalziel (Venezuela) Alex Popow	Ford 5.0L V8	120
3	DP	99	(United States) GAINSCO/Bob Stallings Racing	(United States) Jon Fogarty (United States) Alex Gurney	Corvette DP (Riley XXVI)	120
3	DP	99	(United States) GAINSCO/Bob Stallings Racing	(United States) Jon Fogarty (United States) Alex Gurney	Chevrolet 5.0L V8	120
4	DP	6	(United States) Michael Shank Racing	(Brazil) Antonio Pizzonia (Colombia) Gustavo Yacamán	Riley Mk. XXVI	120
4	DP	6	(United States) Michael Shank Racing	(Brazil) Antonio Pizzonia (Colombia) Gustavo Yacamán	Ford 5.0L V8	120
5	DP	90	(United States) Spirit of Daytona Racing	(United States) Ricky Taylor (United Kingdom) Richard Westbrook	Corvette DP (Coyote)	120
5	DP	90	(United States) Spirit of Daytona Racing	(United States) Ricky Taylor (United Kingdom) Richard Westbrook	Chevrolet 5.0L V8	120
6	DP	10	(United States) Wayne Taylor Racing	(Italy) Max Angelelli (United States) Jordan Taylor	Corvette DP (Dallara)	120
6	DP	10	(United States) Wayne Taylor Racing	(Italy) Max Angelelli (United States) Jordan Taylor	Chevrolet 5.0L V8	120
7	DP	60	(United States) Michael Shank Racing	(Canada) Michael Valiante (United States) John Pew	Riley Mk. XXVI	120
7	DP	60	(United States) Michael Shank Racing	(Canada) Michael Valiante (United States) John Pew	Ford 5.0L V8	120
8	DP	9	(United States) Action Express Racing	(United States) Brian Frisselle (United States) Burt Frisselle	Corvette DP (Coyote)	120
8	DP	9	(United States) Action Express Racing	(United States) Brian Frisselle (United States) Burt Frisselle	Chevrolet 5.0L V8	120
9	DP	3	(United States) 8 Star Motorsports	(Venezuela) Enzo Potolicchio (France) Stéphane Sarrazin	Corvette DP (Coyote)	119
9	DP	3	(United States) 8 Star Motorsports	(Venezuela) Enzo Potolicchio (France) Stéphane Sarrazin	Chevrolet 5.0L V8	119
10	DP	8	(United States) Starworks Motorsport	(New Zealand) Brendon Hartley (United States) Scott Mayer	Riley Mk. XXVI	119
10	DP	8	(United States) Starworks Motorsport	(New Zealand) Brendon Hartley (United States) Scott Mayer	Ford 5.0L V8	119
11	DP	43	(United States) Team Sahlen	(United States) Joe Nonnamaker (United States) Will Nonnamaker	Riley Mk. XXVI	114
11	DP	43	(United States) Team Sahlen	(United States) Joe Nonnamaker (United States) Will Nonnamaker	BMW 5.0L V8	114
12	**GT**	**57**	**(United States) Stevenson Motorsports**	**(United States) John Edwards** **(Scotland) Robin Liddell**	**Chevrolet Camaro GT.R**	**112**
12	**GT**	**57**	**(United States) Stevenson Motorsports**	**(United States) John Edwards** **(Scotland) Robin Liddell**	**Chevrolet 6.2L V8**	**112**
13	GT	73	(United States) Park Place Motorsports	(United States) Patrick Lindsey (United States) Patrick Long	Porsche 911 GT3 Cup	112
13	GT	73	(United States) Park Place Motorsports	(United States) Patrick Lindsey (United States) Patrick Long	Porsche 4.0L F6	112
14	GT	63	(United States) Scuderia Corsa Michelotto	(Italy) Alessandro Balzan (United States) Jeff Westphal	Ferrari 458 Italia Grand-Am	112
14	GT	63	(United States) Scuderia Corsa Michelotto	(Italy) Alessandro Balzan (United States) Jeff Westphal	Ferrari 4.5L V8	112
15	GT	59	(United States) Brumos Racing	(United States) Andrew Davis (United States) Leh Keen	Porsche 911 GT3 Cup	112
15	GT	59	(United States) Brumos Racing	(United States) Andrew Davis (United States) Leh Keen	Porsche 4.0L F6	112
16	GT	44	(United States) Magnus Racing	(United States) Andy Lally (United States) John Potter	Porsche 911 GT3 Cup	112
16	GT	44	(United States) Magnus Racing	(United States) Andy Lally (United States) John Potter	Porsche 4.0L F6	112
17	GT	61	(United States) R. Ferri/AIM Motorsport Racing with Ferrari	(Italy) Max Papis (United States) Jeff Segal	Ferrari 458 Italia Grand-Am	112
17	GT	61	(United States) R. Ferri/AIM Motorsport Racing with Ferrari	(Italy) Max Papis (United States) Jeff Segal	Ferrari 4.5L V8	112
18	GT	94	(United States) Turner Motorsport	(United States) Billy Johnson (Canada) Paul Dalla Lana	BMW M3	111
18	GT	94	(United States) Turner Motorsport	(United States) Billy Johnson (Canada) Paul Dalla Lana	BMW 5.0L V8	111
19	GT	69	(United States) AIM Autosport Team FXDD with Ferrari	(United States) Emil Assentato (United States) Anthony Lazzaro	Ferrari 458 Italia Grand-Am	110
19	GT	69	(United States) AIM Autosport Team FXDD with Ferrari	(United States) Emil Assentato (United States) Anthony Lazzaro	Ferrari 4.5L V8	110
20	GT	18	(Belgium) Mühlner Motorsports America	(United States) Josh Hurley (Canada) Aaron Povoledo	Porsche 911 GT3 Cup	109
20	GT	18	(Belgium) Mühlner Motorsports America	(United States) Josh Hurley (Canada) Aaron Povoledo	Porsche 4.0L F6	109
21	GT	71	(United States) Park Place Motorsports	(United States) Jason Hart (United States) John McCutchen	Porsche 911 GT3 Cup	108
21	GT	71	(United States) Park Place Motorsports	(United States) Jason Hart (United States) John McCutchen	Porsche 4.0L F6	108
22	**GX**	**00**	**(United States) Visit Florida Racing/Speedsource**	**(United States) Joel Miller** **(United States) Andrew Carbonell**	**Mazda6 GX**	**103**
22	**GX**	**00**	**(United States) Visit Florida Racing/Speedsource**	**(United States) Joel Miller** **(United States) Andrew Carbonell**	**Mazda 2.2L I4 Diesel**	**103**
23	GX	38	(United States) BGB Motorsports	(United States) Jim Norman (United States) David Donahue	Porsche Cayman GX.R	103
23	GX	38	(United States) BGB Motorsports	(United States) Jim Norman (United States) David Donahue	Porsche 3.8L F6	103
24	DP	5	(United States) Action Express Racing	(Brazil) Christian Fittipaldi (Portugal) João Barbosa	Corvette DP (Coyote)	100
24	DP	5	(United States) Action Express Racing	(Brazil) Christian Fittipaldi (Portugal) João Barbosa	Chevrolet 5.0L V8	100
25	GX	70	(United States) Mazdaspeed/Speedsource	(United States) Tom Long (Canada) Sylvain Tremblay	Mazda6 GX	99
25	GX	70	(United States) Mazdaspeed/Speedsource	(United States) Tom Long (Canada) Sylvain Tremblay	Mazda 2.2L I4 Diesel	99
26 DNF	DP	42	(United States) Team Sahlen	(United States) Dane Cameron (United States) Wayne Nonnamaker	Riley Mk. XXVI	64
26 DNF	DP	42	(United States) Team Sahlen	(United States) Dane Cameron (United States) Wayne Nonnamaker	BMW 5.0L V8	64
27 DNF	GT	31	(United States) Marsh Racing	(United States) Eric Curran (United States) Boris Said	Chevrolet Corvette	18
27 DNF	GT	31	(United States) Marsh Racing	(United States) Eric Curran (United States) Boris Said	Chevrolet 6.2L V8	18
28 DNF	GT	93	(United States) Turner Motorsport	(United States) Michael Marsal (Canada) Gunter Schaldach	BMW M3	13
28 DNF	GT	93	(United States) Turner Motorsport	(United States) Michael Marsal (Canada) Gunter Schaldach	BMW 5.0L V8	13

Preceded by 2013 Porsche 250	Rolex Sports Car Series; 2013	Succeeded by 2013 Chevrolet Grand-Am 200
