= 2009 24 Hours of Daytona =

| Previous: 2008 | Next: 2010 |
Index: Races | Winners

Track map of Daytona International Speedway

The 2009 Rolex 24 at Daytona Presented by Crown Royal Cask No. 16 was the first round of the 2009 Rolex Sports Car Series season. It took place at Daytona International Speedway between January 24–25, 2009. David Donohue won the race 40 years after his father won by holding off a furious charge from NASCAR driver Juan Pablo Montoya in the closest finish in race history by 0.167 seconds after overtaking Montoya in the final hour, beating the previous record of 30.879 seconds from 2000. It was Brumos Racing's first Rolex Sports Car Series win since 2003 and prevented Chip Ganassi Racing from securing a fourth successive 24 Hours of Daytona victory.

== Race results ==
Class winners in bold.

| Pos | Class | No | Team | Drivers | Chassis | Laps |
| Pos | Class | No | Team | Drivers | Engine | Laps |
|---|---|---|---|---|---|---|
| 1 | **DP** | **58** | **(United States) Brumos Racing** | **(United States) Darren Law (United States) David Donohue (United States) Buddy Rice (Spain) Antonio García** | **Riley Mk. XI** | **735** |
| 1 | **DP** | **58** | **(United States) Brumos Racing** | **(United States) Darren Law (United States) David Donohue (United States) Buddy Rice (Spain) Antonio García** | Porsche 3.99L Flat-6 | **735** |
| 2 | DP | 01 | (United States) Chip Ganassi Racing with Felix Sabates | (United States) Scott Pruett (Mexico) Memo Rojas (Colombia) Juan Pablo Montoya | Riley Mk. XX | 735 |
| 2 | DP | 01 | (United States) Chip Ganassi Racing with Felix Sabates | (United States) Scott Pruett (Mexico) Memo Rojas (Colombia) Juan Pablo Montoya | Lexus 5.0L V8 | 735 |
| 3 | DP | 59 | (United States) Brumos Racing | (United States) J. C. France (Portugal) João Barbosa (United States) Terry Borcheller (United States) Hurley Haywood | Riley Mk. XI | 735 |
| 3 | DP | 59 | (United States) Brumos Racing | (United States) J. C. France (Portugal) João Barbosa (United States) Terry Borcheller (United States) Hurley Haywood | Porsche 3.99L Flat-6 | 735 |
| 4 | DP | 10 | (United States) SunTrust Racing | (South Africa) Wayne Taylor (Italy) Max Angelelli (United States) Brian Frisselle (Portugal) Pedro Lamy | Dallara DP01 | 735 |
| 4 | DP | 10 | (United States) SunTrust Racing | (South Africa) Wayne Taylor (Italy) Max Angelelli (United States) Brian Frisselle (Portugal) Pedro Lamy | Ford 5.0L V8 | 735 |
| 5 | DP | 02 | (United States) Chip Ganassi Racing with Felix Sabates | (New Zealand) Scott Dixon (United Kingdom) Dario Franchitti (United Kingdom) Alex Lloyd | Riley Mk. XI | 731 |
| 5 | DP | 02 | (United States) Chip Ganassi Racing with Felix Sabates | (New Zealand) Scott Dixon (United Kingdom) Dario Franchitti (United Kingdom) Alex Lloyd | Lexus 5.0L V8 | 731 |
| 6 | DP | 16 | (United States) Penske Racing | (France) Romain Dumas (Germany) Timo Bernhard (Australia) Ryan Briscoe | Riley Mk. XX | 717 |
| 6 | DP | 16 | (United States) Penske Racing | (France) Romain Dumas (Germany) Timo Bernhard (Australia) Ryan Briscoe | Porsche 3.99L Flat-6 | 717 |
| 7 | DP | 99 | (United States) GAINSCO/Bob Stallings Racing | (United States) Jon Fogarty (United States) Alex Gurney (United States) Jimmy Vasser (United States) Jimmie Johnson | Riley Mk. XX | 714 |
| 7 | DP | 99 | (United States) GAINSCO/Bob Stallings Racing | (United States) Jon Fogarty (United States) Alex Gurney (United States) Jimmy Vasser (United States) Jimmie Johnson | Pontiac 5.0L V8 | 714 |
| 8 | DP | 2 | (United States) Childress-Howard Motorsports | (United Kingdom) Andy Wallace (United States) Rob Finlay (United States) Danica Patrick (United States) Casey Mears | Crawford DP08 | 702 |
| 8 | DP | 2 | (United States) Childress-Howard Motorsports | (United Kingdom) Andy Wallace (United States) Rob Finlay (United States) Danica Patrick (United States) Casey Mears | Pontiac 5.0L V8 | 702 |
| 9 | **GT** | **67** | **(United States) The Racer's Group** | **(United States) Justin Marks (United States) Andy Lally (United States) R. J. Valentine (Germany) Jörg Bergmeister (United States) Patrick Long** | **Porsche 997 GT3 Cup** | **695** |
| 9 | **GT** | **67** | **(United States) The Racer's Group** | **(United States) Justin Marks (United States) Andy Lally (United States) R. J. Valentine (Germany) Jörg Bergmeister (United States) Patrick Long** | Porsche 3.6L Flat-6 | **695** |
| 10 | GT | 66 | (United States) The Racer's Group | (United States) Ted Ballou (United States) Spencer Pumpelly (United States) Tim George Jr. (France) Emmanuel Collard (Austria) Richard Lietz | Porsche 997 GT3 Cup | 694 |
| 10 | GT | 66 | (United States) The Racer's Group | (United States) Ted Ballou (United States) Spencer Pumpelly (United States) Tim George Jr. (France) Emmanuel Collard (Austria) Richard Lietz | Porsche 3.6L Flat-6 | 694 |
| 11 | GT | 33 | (United States) Wright Motorsports | (United States) Phillip Martien (United States) B. J. Zacharias (Germany) Sascha Maassen (France) Patrick Pilet | Porsche 997 GT3 Cup | 691 |
| 11 | GT | 33 | (United States) Wright Motorsports | (United States) Phillip Martien (United States) B. J. Zacharias (Germany) Sascha Maassen (France) Patrick Pilet | Porsche 3.6L Flat-6 | 691 |
| 12 | GT | 07 | (United States) Banner Racing | (United States) Paul Edwards (United States) Kelly Collins (Denmark) Jan Magnussen | Pontiac GXP.R | 689 |
| 12 | GT | 07 | (United States) Banner Racing | (United States) Paul Edwards (United States) Kelly Collins (Denmark) Jan Magnussen | Pontiac 6.0L V8 | 689 |
| 13 | GT | 86 | (United States) Farnbacher Loles Racing | (Germany) Dominik Farnbacher (United States) Eric Lux (Hong Kong) Matthew Marsh (United States) Kevin Roush | Porsche 997 GT3 Cup | 688 |
| 13 | GT | 86 | (United States) Farnbacher Loles Racing | (Germany) Dominik Farnbacher (United States) Eric Lux (Hong Kong) Matthew Marsh (United States) Kevin Roush | Porsche 3.6L Flat-6 | 688 |
| 14 | GT | 57 | (United States) Stevenson Motorsports | (United Kingdom) Robin Liddell (United States) Andrew Davis (United States) Jeff Bucknum | Pontiac GXP.R | 684 |
| 14 | GT | 57 | (United States) Stevenson Motorsports | (United Kingdom) Robin Liddell (United States) Andrew Davis (United States) Jeff Bucknum | Pontiac 6.0L V8 | 684 |
| 15 | GT | 88 | (United States) Farnbacher Loles Racing | (United States) Steve Johnson (Canada) Dave Lacey (United Kingdom) Robert Nearn (United Kingdom) Richard Westbrook (United States) James Sofronas | Porsche 997 GT3 Cup | 680 |
| 15 | GT | 88 | (United States) Farnbacher Loles Racing | (United States) Steve Johnson (Canada) Dave Lacey (United Kingdom) Robert Nearn (United Kingdom) Richard Westbrook (United States) James Sofronas | Porsche 3.6L Flat-6 | 680 |
| 16 | GT | 87 | (United States) Farnbacher Loles Racing | (United States) Leh Keen (Germany) Dirk Werner (Germany) Wolf Henzler (United Kingdom) Richard Westbrook | Porsche 997 GT3 Cup | 676 |
| 16 | GT | 87 | (United States) Farnbacher Loles Racing | (United States) Leh Keen (Germany) Dirk Werner (Germany) Wolf Henzler (United Kingdom) Richard Westbrook | Porsche 3.6L Flat-6 | 676 |
| 17 | GT | 69 | (United States) SpeedSource | (United States) Emil Assentato (United States) Jeff Segal (United States) Nick Longhi (United States) Matt Plumb | Mazda RX-8 GT | 675 |
| 17 | GT | 69 | (United States) SpeedSource | (United States) Emil Assentato (United States) Jeff Segal (United States) Nick Longhi (United States) Matt Plumb | Mazda 2.0L 3-Rotor | 675 |
| 18 | GT | 26 | (United States) Gotham Competition | (United States) Jerome Jacalone (United States) Joe Jacalone (United States) Randy Pobst (United States) Gerardo Bonilla (United States) Shane Lewis | Porsche 997 GT3 Cup | 675 |
| 18 | GT | 26 | (United States) Gotham Competition | (United States) Jerome Jacalone (United States) Joe Jacalone (United States) Randy Pobst (United States) Gerardo Bonilla (United States) Shane Lewis | Porsche 3.6L Flat-6 | 675 |
| 19 | DP | 55 | (United States) Level 5 Motorsports | (United States) Scott Tucker (United States) Ed Zabinski (France) Christophe Bouchut (Brazil) Raphael Matos | Riley Mk. XX | 665 |
| 19 | DP | 55 | (United States) Level 5 Motorsports | (United States) Scott Tucker (United States) Ed Zabinski (France) Christophe Bouchut (Brazil) Raphael Matos | BMW 5.0L V8 | 665 |
| 20 DNF | DP | 13 | (United States) Beyer Racing | (United States) Ricky Taylor (United States) Jared Beyer (Mexico) David Martínez (United States) Jordan Taylor | Riley Mk. XI | 662 |
| 20 DNF | DP | 13 | (United States) Beyer Racing | (United States) Ricky Taylor (United States) Jared Beyer (Mexico) David Martínez (United States) Jordan Taylor | Pontiac 5.0L V8 | 662 |
| 21 | GT | 32 | (United States) PR1 Motorsports | (Canada) Mike Forest (United States) Thomas Merrill (United States) Al Salvo (United States) Jeff Westphal | Pontiac GXP.R | 656 |
| 21 | GT | 32 | (United States) PR1 Motorsports | (Canada) Mike Forest (United States) Thomas Merrill (United States) Al Salvo (United States) Jeff Westphal | Pontiac 6.0L V8 | 656 |
| 22 | GT | 97 | (United States) Stevenson Motorsports | (United States) James Gue (United States) Tom Long (United States) Ryan Eversley (United States) Galen Bieker | Chevrolet Corvette C6 | 650 |
| 22 | GT | 97 | (United States) Stevenson Motorsports | (United States) James Gue (United States) Tom Long (United States) Ryan Eversley (United States) Galen Bieker | Chevrolet 5.7L V8 | 650 |
| 23 | DP | 09 | (United States) Spirit of Daytona Racing | (United States) Guy Cosmo (United States) Scott Russell (United States) Jason Pridmore (United States) Jeff Ward | Coyote CC/08 | 649 |
| 23 | DP | 09 | (United States) Spirit of Daytona Racing | (United States) Guy Cosmo (United States) Scott Russell (United States) Jason Pridmore (United States) Jeff Ward | Porsche 5.0L V8 | 649 |
| 24 | GT | 30 | (United States) Racer's Edge Motorsports | (South Africa) Dion von Moltke (United States) Bryan Sellers (United States) Doug Peterson (United States) Dane Cameron | Mazda RX-8 GT | 647 |
| 24 | GT | 30 | (United States) Racer's Edge Motorsports | (South Africa) Dion von Moltke (United States) Bryan Sellers (United States) Doug Peterson (United States) Dane Cameron | Mazda 2.0L 3-Rotor | 647 |
| 25 | GT | 68 | (United States) The Racer's Group | (Mexico) José Gutiérrez (United States) Chris Pallis (United States) Steve Miller (United States) Scott Schroeder (United States) Duncan Ende | Porsche 997 GT3 Cup | 625 |
| 25 | GT | 68 | (United States) The Racer's Group | (Mexico) José Gutiérrez (United States) Chris Pallis (United States) Steve Miller (United States) Scott Schroeder (United States) Duncan Ende | Porsche 3.6L Flat-6 | 625 |
| 26 | GT | 89 | (United States) Farnbacher Loles Racing | (Italy) Gabrio Rosa (Germany) Pierre Kaffer (Italy) Giacomo Petrobelli (Denmark) Allan Simonsen (Italy) Giorgio Rosa | Porsche 997 GT3 Cup | 622 |
| 26 | GT | 89 | (United States) Farnbacher Loles Racing | (Italy) Gabrio Rosa (Germany) Pierre Kaffer (Italy) Giacomo Petrobelli (Denmark) Allan Simonsen (Italy) Giorgio Rosa | Porsche 3.6L Flat-6 | 622 |
| 27 | GT | 85 | (United States) Farnbacher Loles Racing | (United States) Michael Gomez (United States) Daniel Graff (Germany) Wolf Henzler (United States) Ron Jarab Jr. (Dominican Republic) Richard Campollo | Porsche 997 GT3 Cup | 604 |
| 27 | GT | 85 | (United States) Farnbacher Loles Racing | (United States) Michael Gomez (United States) Daniel Graff (Germany) Wolf Henzler (United States) Ron Jarab Jr. (Dominican Republic) Richard Campollo | Porsche 3.6L Flat-6 | 604 |
| 28 | GT | 70 | (United States) SpeedSource | (United States) David Haskell (Canada) Sylvain Tremblay (United States) Nick Ham (United States) Jonathan Bomarito | Mazda RX-8 GT | 591 |
| 28 | GT | 70 | (United States) SpeedSource | (United States) David Haskell (Canada) Sylvain Tremblay (United States) Nick Ham (United States) Jonathan Bomarito | Mazda 2.0L 3-Rotor | 591 |
| 29 | GT | 63 | (United States) The Racer's Group | (United States) David Quinlan (United States) Bruce Ledoux (United States) Dan Watkins (United States) Steve Zadig (United States) Kurt Kossmann | Porsche 997 GT3 Cup | 572 |
| 29 | GT | 63 | (United States) The Racer's Group | (United States) David Quinlan (United States) Bruce Ledoux (United States) Dan Watkins (United States) Steve Zadig (United States) Kurt Kossmann | Porsche 3.6L Flat-6 | 572 |
| 30 | GT | 44 | (United States) Bullet Racing | (Canada) Ross Bentley (Canada) Keith Carter (United States) Daniel Herrington (Canada) Glenn Nixon | Porsche 997 GT3 Cup | 519 |
| 30 | GT | 44 | (United States) Bullet Racing | (Canada) Ross Bentley (Canada) Keith Carter (United States) Daniel Herrington (Canada) Glenn Nixon | Porsche 3.6L Flat-6 | 519 |
| 31 DNF | DP | 77 | (United States) Doran Racing | (United States) Memo Gidley (United States) Brad Jaeger (Italy) Fabrizio Gollin (Italy) Matteo Bobbi | Dallara DP01 | 504 |
| 31 DNF | DP | 77 | (United States) Doran Racing | (United States) Memo Gidley (United States) Brad Jaeger (Italy) Fabrizio Gollin (Italy) Matteo Bobbi | Ford 5.0L V8 | 504 |
| 32 DNF | GT | 35 | (United States) Orbit Racing | (United States) Lawson Aschenbach (Costa Rica) Emilio Valverde (United States) Lance Willsey (United States) Omar Rodriguez (Puerto Rico) Hiram Cruz | Porsche 997 GT3 Cup | 454 |
| 32 DNF | GT | 35 | (United States) Orbit Racing | (United States) Lawson Aschenbach (Costa Rica) Emilio Valverde (United States) Lance Willsey (United States) Omar Rodriguez (Puerto Rico) Hiram Cruz | Porsche 3.6L Flat-6 | 454 |
| 33 DNF | GT | 65 | (United States) Riegel/Stanton/The Racer's Group | (United States) Craig Stanton (United States) John Potter (United States) Bryce Miller (Germany) Marco Holzer | Porsche 997 GT3 Cup | 379 |
| 33 DNF | GT | 65 | (United States) Riegel/Stanton/The Racer's Group | (United States) Craig Stanton (United States) John Potter (United States) Bryce Miller (Germany) Marco Holzer | Porsche 3.6L Flat-6 | 379 |
| 34 DNF | DP | 75 | (United States) Krohn Racing | (United States) Tracy Krohn (Belgium) Eric van de Poele (United Kingdom) Oliver Gavin | Proto-Auto Lola B08/70 | 374 |
| 34 DNF | DP | 75 | (United States) Krohn Racing | (United States) Tracy Krohn (Belgium) Eric van de Poele (United Kingdom) Oliver Gavin | Pontiac 5.0L V8 | 374 |
| 35 DNF | GT | 40 | (United States) Dempsey Racing | (United States) Joe Foster (United States) Patrick Dempsey (United States) Charles Espenlaub (United States) Tim Lewis Jr. (United States) Jep Thornton | Mazda RX-8 GT | 343 |
| 35 DNF | GT | 40 | (United States) Dempsey Racing | (United States) Joe Foster (United States) Patrick Dempsey (United States) Charles Espenlaub (United States) Tim Lewis Jr. (United States) Jep Thornton | Mazda 2.0L 3-Rotor | 343 |
| 36 DNF | GT | 56 | (Italy) Mastercar-Coast 2 Costa Racing | (Italy) Luca Drudi (Portugal) César Campaniço (Italy) Max Papis (United States) Nathan Swartzbaugh | Ferrari F430 Challenge | 324 |
| 36 DNF | GT | 56 | (Italy) Mastercar-Coast 2 Costa Racing | (Italy) Luca Drudi (Portugal) César Campaniço (Italy) Max Papis (United States) Nathan Swartzbaugh | Ferrari 4.3L V8 | 324 |
| 37 DNF | GT | 21 | (United States) Battery Tender/MCM Racing | (United States) Jason Daskalos (Mexico) Pepe Montaño (Italy) Diego Alessi (United States) Jason Vinkemulder | Pontiac GTO.R | 321 |
| 37 DNF | GT | 21 | (United States) Battery Tender/MCM Racing | (United States) Jason Daskalos (Mexico) Pepe Montaño (Italy) Diego Alessi (United States) Jason Vinkemulder | Pontiac 6.0L V8 | 321 |
| 38 DNF | DP | 61 | (United States) AIM Autosport | (United States) Burt Frisselle (Canada) Mark Wilkins (Canada) John Farano (United States) Alex Figge | Riley Mk. XX | 301 |
| 38 DNF | DP | 61 | (United States) AIM Autosport | (United States) Burt Frisselle (Canada) Mark Wilkins (Canada) John Farano (United States) Alex Figge | Ford 5.0L V8 | 301 |
| 39 DNF | DP | 22 | (United States) Alegra Motorsports | (United States) Carlos de Quesada (United Kingdom) Ryan Dalziel (Czech Republic) Tomáš Enge (United States) Chapman Ducote | Riley Mk. XI | 292 |
| 39 DNF | DP | 22 | (United States) Alegra Motorsports | (United States) Carlos de Quesada (United Kingdom) Ryan Dalziel (Czech Republic) Tomáš Enge (United States) Chapman Ducote | BMW 5.0L V8 | 292 |
| 40 DNF | GT | 52 | (Italy) Mastercar-Coast 2 Costa Racing | (Italy) Joe Castellano (United States) Constantino Bertuzzi (Italy) Luca Pirri Ardizzone (San Marino) Christian Montanari (United States) Cort Wagner | Ferrari F430 Challenge | 292 |
| 40 DNF | GT | 52 | (Italy) Mastercar-Coast 2 Costa Racing | (Italy) Joe Castellano (United States) Constantino Bertuzzi (Italy) Luca Pirri Ardizzone (San Marino) Christian Montanari (United States) Cort Wagner | Ferrari 4.3L V8 | 292 |
| 41 DNF | DP | 60 | (United States) Michael Shank Racing | (United States) Mark Patterson (Brazil) Oswaldo Negri Jr. (United States) Ryan Hunter-Reay (United States) Colin Braun | Riley Mk. XX | 262 |
| 41 DNF | DP | 60 | (United States) Michael Shank Racing | (United States) Mark Patterson (Brazil) Oswaldo Negri Jr. (United States) Ryan Hunter-Reay (United States) Colin Braun | Ford 5.0L V8 | 262 |
| 42 DNF | GT | 14 | (United States) Autometric Motorsports | (Argentina) Claudio Burtin (United States) Jack Baldwin (United States) Mac McGehee (United States) Cory Friedman (Austria) Martin Ragginger | Porsche 997 GT3 Cup | 259 |
| 42 DNF | GT | 14 | (United States) Autometric Motorsports | (Argentina) Claudio Burtin (United States) Jack Baldwin (United States) Mac McGehee (United States) Cory Friedman (Austria) Martin Ragginger | Porsche 3.6L Flat-6 | 259 |
| 43 DNF | GT | 31 | (United States) Battery Tender/MCM Racing | (United States) Jim Michaelian (United States) Bob Michaelian (United States) Romeo Kapudija (United States) John McMullen Jr. (United States) John Lewis | Porsche 997 GT3 Cup | 245 |
| 43 DNF | GT | 31 | (United States) Battery Tender/MCM Racing | (United States) Jim Michaelian (United States) Bob Michaelian (United States) Romeo Kapudija (United States) John McMullen Jr. (United States) John Lewis | Porsche 3.6L Flat-6 | 245 |
| 44 DNF | DP | 45 | (United States) Orbit Racing | (United Kingdom) Darren Manning (United States) Bill Lester (United States) Leo Hindery (United States) Kyle Petty | Riley Mk. XI | 216 |
| 44 DNF | DP | 45 | (United States) Orbit Racing | (United Kingdom) Darren Manning (United States) Bill Lester (United States) Leo Hindery (United States) Kyle Petty | BMW 5.0L V8 | 216 |
| 45 DNF | GT | 64 | (United States) JLowe Racing | (United States) Jim Lowe (United States) Jim Pace (United States) Johannes van Overbeek (United Kingdom) Tim Sugden | Porsche 997 GT3 Cup | 201 |
| 45 DNF | GT | 64 | (United States) JLowe Racing | (United States) Jim Lowe (United States) Jim Pace (United States) Johannes van Overbeek (United Kingdom) Tim Sugden | Porsche 3.6L Flat-6 | 201 |
| 46 DNF | DP | 76 | (United States) Krohn Racing | (Sweden) Niclas Jönsson (Brazil) Ricardo Zonta (United Kingdom) Darren Turner | Proto-Auto Lola B08/70 | 159 |
| 46 DNF | DP | 76 | (United States) Krohn Racing | (Sweden) Niclas Jönsson (Brazil) Ricardo Zonta (United Kingdom) Darren Turner | Pontiac 5.0L V8 | 159 |
| 47 DNF | DP | 6 | (United States) Michael Shank Racing | (Canada) Michael Valiante (United Kingdom) Ian James (United States) A. J. Allmendinger (United States) John Pew | Riley Mk. XX | 153 |
| 47 DNF | DP | 6 | (United States) Michael Shank Racing | (Canada) Michael Valiante (United Kingdom) Ian James (United States) A. J. Allmendinger (United States) John Pew | Ford 5.0L V8 | 153 |
| 48 DNF | GT | 15 | (United States) Blackforest Motorsports | (United States) Boris Said (Australia) Owen Kelly (Australia) Paul Morris (United States) Tom Nastasi | Ford Mustang FR500 | 52 |
| 48 DNF | GT | 15 | (United States) Blackforest Motorsports | (United States) Boris Said (Australia) Owen Kelly (Australia) Paul Morris (United States) Tom Nastasi | Ford 5.0L V8 | 52 |
| 49 DNF | GT | 42 | (United States) Team Sahlen | (United States) Wayne Nonnamaker (United States) Joe Nonnamaker (United States) Will Nonnamaker (United States) Joe Sahlen | Chevrolet Corvette C6 | 24 |
| 49 DNF | GT | 42 | (United States) Team Sahlen | (United States) Wayne Nonnamaker (United States) Joe Nonnamaker (United States) Will Nonnamaker (United States) Joe Sahlen | Chevrolet 5.7L V8 | 24 |
| DNS | GT | 34 | (United States) Orbit Racing | (United States) Lawson Aschenbach (United States) Hiram Cruz (United States) Omar Rodriguez (Costa Rica) Emilio Valverde (United States) Lance Willsey | Porsche 997 GT3 Cup | - |
| DNS | GT | 34 | (United States) Orbit Racing | (United States) Lawson Aschenbach (United States) Hiram Cruz (United States) Omar Rodriguez (Costa Rica) Emilio Valverde (United States) Lance Willsey | Porsche 3.6L Flat-6 | - |
| DNS | GT | 43 | (United States) Team Sahlen | (United States) Wayne Nonnamaker (United States) Joe Nonnamaker (United States) Will Nonnamaker (United States) Joe Sahlen | Chevrolet Corvette C6 | - |
| DNS | GT | 43 | (United States) Team Sahlen | (United States) Wayne Nonnamaker (United States) Joe Nonnamaker (United States) Will Nonnamaker (United States) Joe Sahlen | Chevrolet 5.7L V8 | - |
| DNS | DP | 7 | (United States) Penske Racing | (Germany) Timo Bernhard (Australia) Ryan Briscoe | Riley Mk. XX | - |
| DNS | DP | 7 | (United States) Penske Racing | (Germany) Timo Bernhard (Australia) Ryan Briscoe | Porsche 3.99L Flat-6 | - |

Rolex Sports Car Series
| Previous race: None | 2009 season | Next race: Bosch Engineering 250 at VIR |
