= 2014 Tequila Patrón Sports Car Showcase =

Third round of the 2014 United SportsCar Championship season

Long Beach Street Circuit

The 2014 Tequila Patrón Sports Car Showcase at Long Beach was a sports car race held on the Long Beach Street Circuit in California, United States, on 11–12 April 2014 as part of the Long Beach Grand Prix event weekend. The race was the third round of the inaugural Tudor United SportsCar Championship season and held exclusively for the Prototype and GT Le Mans categories, the first such event in the history of the series to not feature all four classes. Scott Pruett and Memo Rojas followed their 2014 12 Hours of Sebring victory with a win at Long Beach, and giving Chip Ganassi Racing their second victory in the history of the sports car event. Wayne Taylor Racing and Action Express Racing's Chevrolet Corvette DPs completed the race podium. Jan Magnussen and Antonio García earned Corvette Racing their first GTLM category win of the season, as well as the first win for the Chevrolet Corvette C7.R.

== Background ==
=== Preview ===
International Motor Sports Association (IMSA) president Scott Atherton confirmed that the race was part of the 2014 United SportsCar Championship schedule in September 2013. It was the first year that the race was part of the series calendar, and the ninth annual running of the race, counting the period between 2006 and 2013 when it was a round of the Rolex Sports Car Series and the American Le Mans Series respectively. The race was the third of 2014's thirteen scheduled IMSA automobile endurance races, the shortest of the season in terms of distance, and it was the first round not held as part of the North American Endurance Cup. The race was held at the eleven-turn 1.968 mi (3.167 km) Long Beach street circuit in Long Beach, California on April 12, 2014.

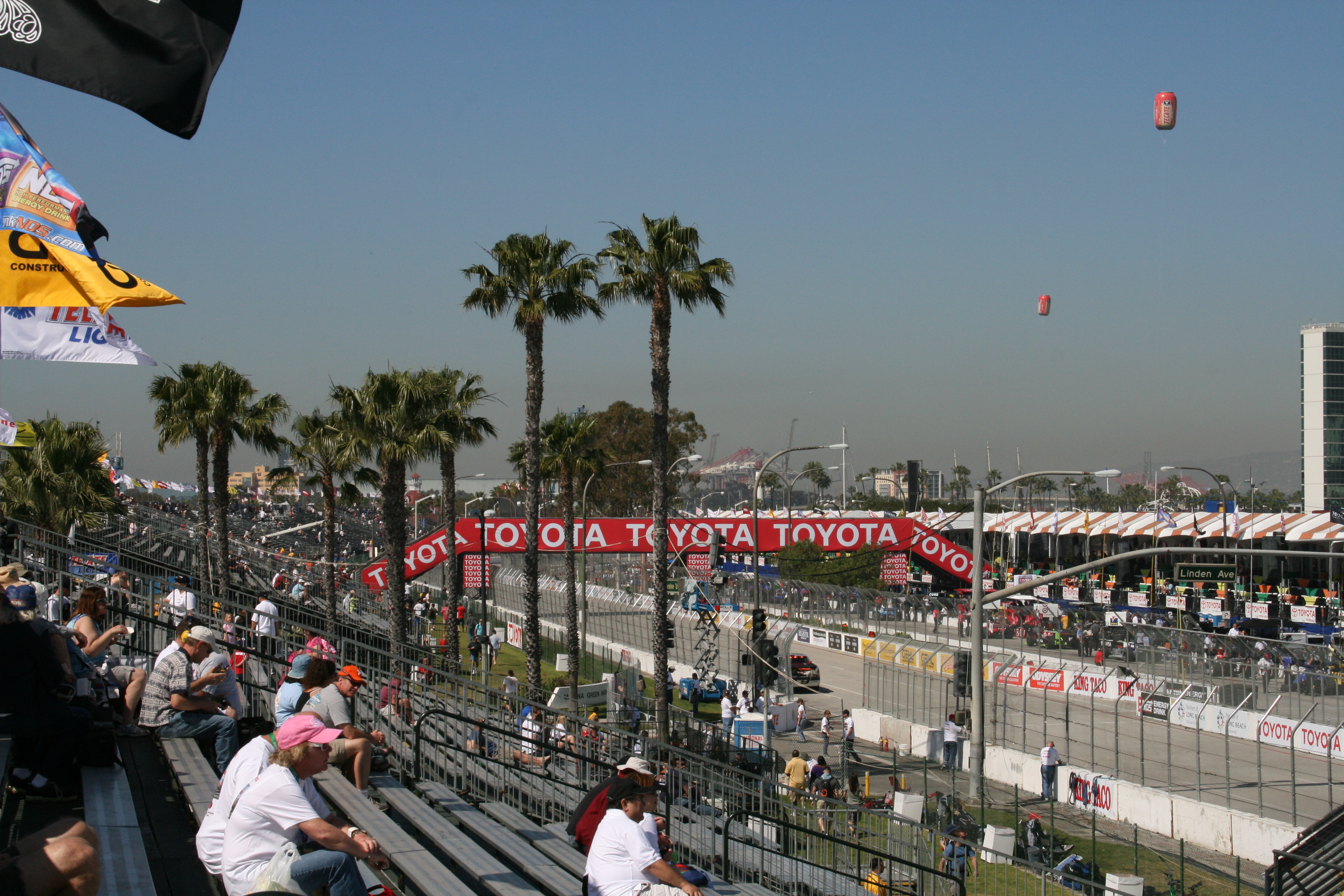
The Long Beach Street Circuit (pictured in 2009), where the race was held.

=== Entry list ===
A total of 21 cars took part in the event split across 2 classes. In P, Chip Ganassi Racing with Felix Sabates and Action Express Racing scaled down to one car. Starworks Motorsport, Fifty Plus Racing, and DeltaWing Racing Cars skipped the event. Muscle Milk Pickett Racing missed the event in order to focus on testing its Oreca 03 before the team closed. In GTLM, Krohn Racing were absent. Dane Cameron replaced Matteo Malucelli who got suspended for dangerous driving at Sebring, in the Risi Competizione entry.

== Practice ==
There were two practice sessions preceding the start of the race on Saturday, one on Friday morning and one on Friday afternoon. The first session lasted two hours on Friday morning while the second session on Friday afternoon lasted 30 minutes.

=== Practice 1 ===
The first practice session at 7:40 am PT on Friday and ended with Scott Pruett topping the charts for Chip Ganassi Racing with Felix Sabates, with a lap time of 1:16.441.

Pos.	Class	No.	Team	Driver	Time	Gap
1	P	01	Chip Ganassi Racing with Felix Sabates	Scott Pruett	1:16.441	_
2	P	60	Michael Shank Racing with Curb/Agajanian	Oswaldo Negri	1:16.681	+0.240
3	P	5	Action Express Racing	João Barbosa	1:16.688	+0.247

=== Final Practice ===
The second and final practice session took place at 5:05 pm PT on Friday and ended with Christian Fittipaldi topping the charts for Action Express Racing, with a lap time of 1:16.081.

Pos.	Class	No.	Team	Driver	Time	Gap
1	P	5	Action Express Racing	Christian Fittipaldi	1:16.081	_
2	P	01	Chip Ganassi Racing with Felix Sabates	Scott Pruett	1:16.135	+0.054
3	P	10	Wayne Taylor Racing	Jordan Taylor	1:16.475	+0.394

== Qualifying ==
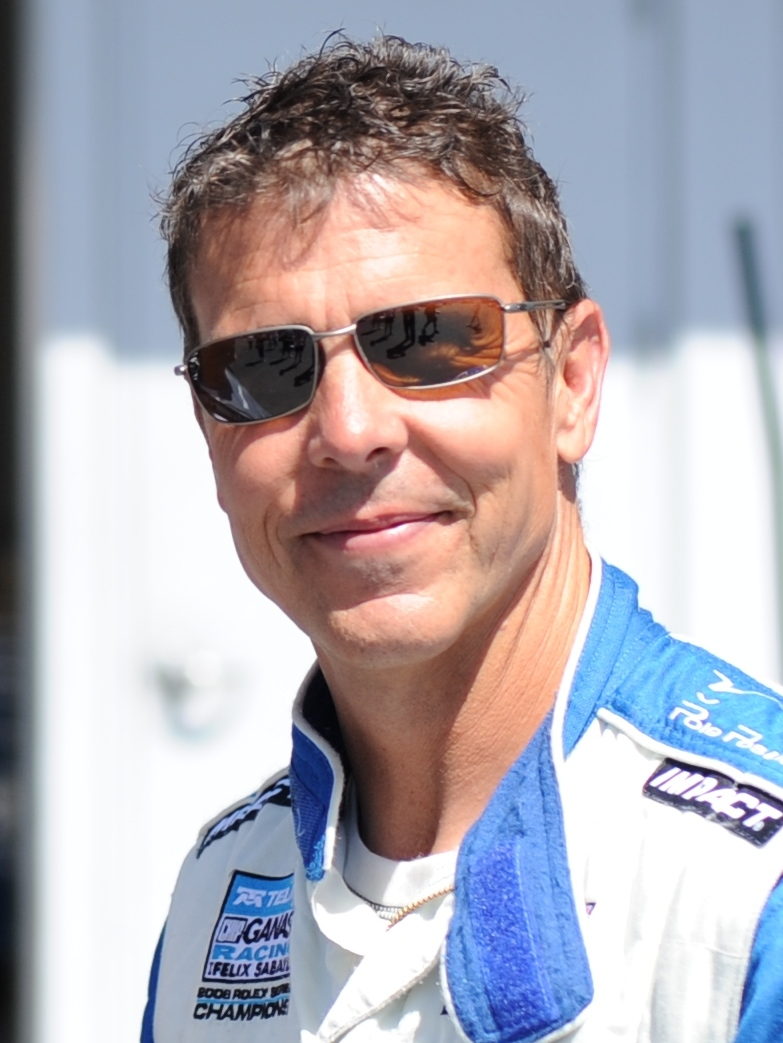
Scott Pruett (pictured in 2009) took the overall pole position for Chip Ganassi Racing with Felix Sabates.

Pruett in the No. 01 CGR Riley DP took his first pole position of the season with a lap of 1 minute, 15.325 seconds. He was joined on the grid's front row by Negri whose best lap in the No. 60 MSR car was 0.041 seconds slower. Christian Fittipaldi qualified the No. 5 AER Corvette DP in third. Olivier Pla's No. 42 OAK Racing Morgan was the highest placed of all the LMP2 entrants in fourth position. The No. 10 Corvette DP of Ricky Taylor started from fifth place.

In GTLM, Magnussen took his pole position of the season with a lap of 1 minute and 17.939 seconds. He was joined by Bill Auberlen's No. 55 BMW Z4 on the grid's front row with his best lap being 0.152 seconds slower, and Dirk Müller drove the No. 56 BMW to third place. Milner qualified the No. 4 Corvette in fourth position. The two Porsches were fifth and sixth (the No. 911 car driven by Tandy in front of the No. 912 vehicle of Christensen).

=== Qualifying results ===
Pole positions in each class are indicated in bold and by ‡.

Pos.	Class	No.	Team	Driver	Time	Gap	Grid
1	**P**	**01**	**(United States) Chip Ganassi Racing with Felix Sabates**	**(United States) Scott Pruett**	**1:15.325**	**_**	1‡
2	P	60	(United States) Michael Shank Racing with Curb/Agajanian	(Brazil) Oswaldo Negri Jr.	1:15.366	+0.041	2
3	P	5	(United States) Action Express Racing	(Brazil) Christian Fittipaldi	1:15.571	+0.246	3
4	P	42	(France) OAK Racing	(France) Olivier Pla	1:15.668	+0.343	4
5	P	10	(United States) Wayne Taylor Racing	(United States) Ricky Taylor	1:15.743	+0.418	5
6	P	90	(United States) Spirit of Daytona Racing	(Canada) Michael Valiante	1:15.952	+0.627	6
7	P	2	(United States) Extreme Speed Motorsports	(United States) Johannes van Overbeek	1:17.129	+1.804	7
8	P	1	(United States) Extreme Speed Motorsports	(United Kingdom) Ryan Dalziel	1:17.833	+2.508	8
9	**GTLM**	**3**	**(United States) Corvette Racing**	**(Denmark) Jan Magnussen**	**1:17.939**	**+2.614**	9‡
10	GTLM	55	(United States) BMW Team RLL	(United States) Bill Auberlen	1:18.091	+2.766	10
11	GTLM	56	(United States) BMW Team RLL	(Germany) Dirk Müller	1:18.246	+2.921	11
12	GTLM	4	(United States) Corvette Racing	(United States) Tommy Milner	1:18.489	+3.164	12
13	P	31	(United States) Marsh Racing	(United States) Boris Said	1:18.549	+3.224	16
14	GTLM	911	(United States) Porsche North America	(United Kingdom) Nick Tandy	1:18.574	+3.249	17
15	GTLM	912	(United States) Porsche North America	(Denmark) Michael Christensen	1:18.675	+3.350	13
16	GTLM	62	(United States) Risi Competizione	(Italy) Giancarlo Fisichella	1:19.037	+3.712	14
17	GTLM	91	(United States) SRT Motorsports	(Germany) Dominik Farnbacher	1:19.223	+3.898	15
18	GTLM	17	(United States) Team Falken Tire	(United States) Bryan Sellers	1:19.270	+3.945	18
19	GTLM	93	(United States) SRT Motorsports	(United States) Jonathan Bomarito	1:19.980	+4.655	19
20	P	07	(United States) Speedsource	(United States) Tristan Nunez	1:25.331	+10.006	20
21	P	70	(United States) Speedsource	None	No Time Established		21

== Race ==
=== Race result ===
Class winners are indicated with bold.

Final race classification
Pos	Class	No.	Team	Drivers	Chassis	Tire	Laps	Time/Retired
Pos	Class	No.	Team	Drivers	Engine	Tire	Laps	Time/Retired
1	P	01	(United States) Chip Ganassi Racing with Felix Sabates	(United States) Scott Pruett (Mexico) Memo Rojas	Riley MkXXVI	C	77	1:40:46.184‡
1	P	01	(United States) Chip Ganassi Racing with Felix Sabates	(United States) Scott Pruett (Mexico) Memo Rojas	Ford EcoBoost 3.5 L Turbo V6	C	77	1:40:46.184‡
2	P	10	(United States) Wayne Taylor Racing	(United States) Ricky Taylor (United States) Jordan Taylor	Chevrolet Corvette DP	C	77	+0.759
2	P	10	(United States) Wayne Taylor Racing	(United States) Ricky Taylor (United States) Jordan Taylor	Chevrolet LS9 5.5 L V8	C	77	+0.759
3	P	5	(United States) Action Express Racing	(Portugal) João Barbosa (Brazil) Christian Fittipaldi	Chevrolet Corvette DP	C	77	+4.251
3	P	5	(United States) Action Express Racing	(Portugal) João Barbosa (Brazil) Christian Fittipaldi	Chevrolet LS9 5.5 L V8	C	77	+4.251
4	P	42	(France) OAK Racing	(France) Olivier Pla (Colombia) Gustavo Yacamán	Morgan LMP2	C	77	+29.247
4	P	42	(France) OAK Racing	(France) Olivier Pla (Colombia) Gustavo Yacamán	Nissan VK45DE 4.5 L V8	C	77	+29.247
5	P	90	(United States) Spirit of Daytona Racing	(Canada) Michael Valiante (United Kingdom) Richard Westbrook	Chevrolet Corvette DP	C	77	+1:19.445
5	P	90	(United States) Spirit of Daytona Racing	(Canada) Michael Valiante (United Kingdom) Richard Westbrook	Chevrolet LS9 5.5 L V8	C	77	+1:19.445
6 DNF	P	1	(United States) Extreme Speed Motorsports	(United States) Scott Sharp (United Kingdom) Ryan Dalziel	HPD ARX-03b	C	76	Did Not Finish
6 DNF	P	1	(United States) Extreme Speed Motorsports	(United States) Scott Sharp (United Kingdom) Ryan Dalziel	Honda HR28TT 2.8 L Turbo V6	C	76	Did Not Finish
7	P	2	(United States) Extreme Speed Motorsports	(United States) Ed Brown (United States) Johannes van Overbeek	HPD ARX-03b	C	76	+1 lap
7	P	2	(United States) Extreme Speed Motorsports	(United States) Ed Brown (United States) Johannes van Overbeek	Honda HR28TT 2.8 L Turbo V6	C	76	+1 lap
8	GTLM	3	(United States) Corvette Racing	(Denmark) Jan Magnussen (Spain) Antonio García	Chevrolet Corvette C7.R	MI	75	+2 Laps‡
8	GTLM	3	(United States) Corvette Racing	(Denmark) Jan Magnussen (Spain) Antonio García	Chevrolet LT5.5 5.5 L V8	MI	75	+2 Laps‡
9	GTLM	56	(United States) BMW Team RLL	(United States) John Edwards (Germany) Dirk Müller	BMW Z4 GTE	MI	75	+2 Laps
9	GTLM	56	(United States) BMW Team RLL	(United States) John Edwards (Germany) Dirk Müller	BMW 4.4 L V8	MI	75	+2 Laps
10	GTLM	4	(United States) Corvette Racing	(United States) Tommy Milner (United Kingdom) Oliver Gavin	Chevrolet Corvette C7.R	MI	75	+2 Laps
10	GTLM	4	(United States) Corvette Racing	(United States) Tommy Milner (United Kingdom) Oliver Gavin	Chevrolet LT5.5 5.5 L V8	MI	75	+2 Laps
11	GTLM	911	(United States) Porsche North America	(United Kingdom) Nick Tandy (Austria) Richard Lietz	Porsche 911 RSR	MI	75	+2 Laps
11	GTLM	911	(United States) Porsche North America	(United Kingdom) Nick Tandy (Austria) Richard Lietz	Porsche 4.0 L Flat-6	MI	75	+2 Laps
12	GTLM	912	(United States) Porsche North America	(United States) Patrick Long (Denmark) Michael Christensen	Porsche 911 RSR	MI	75	+2 Laps
12	GTLM	912	(United States) Porsche North America	(United States) Patrick Long (Denmark) Michael Christensen	Porsche 4.0 L Flat-6	MI	75	+2 Laps
13	GTLM	55	(United States) BMW Team RLL	(United States) Bill Auberlen (United Kingdom) Andy Priaulx	BMW Z4 GTE	MI	75	+2 Laps
13	GTLM	55	(United States) BMW Team RLL	(United States) Bill Auberlen (United Kingdom) Andy Priaulx	BMW 4.4 L V8	MI	75	+2 Laps
14	GTLM	91	(United States) SRT Motorsports	(Germany) Dominik Farnbacher (Belgium) Marc Goossens (United States) Jonathan Bomarito	SRT Viper GTS-R	MI	75	+2 Laps
14	GTLM	91	(United States) SRT Motorsports	(Germany) Dominik Farnbacher (Belgium) Marc Goossens (United States) Jonathan Bomarito	SRT 8.0 L V10	MI	75	+2 Laps
15	GTLM	17	(United States) Team Falken Tire	(United States) Bryan Sellers (Germany) Wolf Henzler	Porsche 911 RSR	FAL	74	+3 Laps
15	GTLM	17	(United States) Team Falken Tire	(United States) Bryan Sellers (Germany) Wolf Henzler	Porsche 4.0 L Flat-6	FAL	74	+3 Laps
16	GTLM	62	(United States) Risi Competizione	(Italy) Giancarlo Fisichella (United States) Dane Cameron	Ferrari 458 Italia GT2	MI	73	+4 Laps
16	GTLM	62	(United States) Risi Competizione	(Italy) Giancarlo Fisichella (United States) Dane Cameron	Ferrari 4.5 L V8	MI	73	+4 Laps
17	P	07	(United States) Speedsource	(United States) Tristan Nunez (United States) Joel Miller	Mazda Prototype	C	71	+6 Laps
17	P	07	(United States) Speedsource	(United States) Tristan Nunez (United States) Joel Miller	Mazda Skyactiv-D 2.2 L Turbo I4 (Diesel)	C	71	+6 Laps
18 DNF	GTLM	93	(United States) SRT Motorsports	(United States) Jonathan Bomarito (Canada) Kuno Wittmer (Belgium) Marc Goossens	SRT Viper GTS-R	MI	56	Did Not Finish
18 DNF	GTLM	93	(United States) SRT Motorsports	(United States) Jonathan Bomarito (Canada) Kuno Wittmer (Belgium) Marc Goossens	SRT 8.0 L V10	MI	56	Did Not Finish
19 DNF	P	60	(United States) Michael Shank Racing with Curb/Agajanian	(United States) John Pew (Brazil) Oswaldo Negri	Riley MkXXVI	C	39	Did Not Finish
19 DNF	P	60	(United States) Michael Shank Racing with Curb/Agajanian	(United States) John Pew (Brazil) Oswaldo Negri	Ford EcoBoost 3.5 L Turbo V6	C	39	Did Not Finish
20 DNF	P	31	(United States) Marsh Racing	(United States) Eric Curran (United States) Boris Said	Chevrolet Corvette DP	C	22	Did Not Finish
20 DNF	P	31	(United States) Marsh Racing	(United States) Eric Curran (United States) Boris Said	Chevrolet LS9 5.5 L V8	C	22	Did Not Finish
21 DNF	P	70	(United States) Speedsource	(Canada) Sylvain Tremblay (United States) Tom Long	Mazda Prototype	C	3	Did Not Finish
21 DNF	P	70	(United States) Speedsource	(Canada) Sylvain Tremblay (United States) Tom Long	Mazda Skyactiv-D 2.2 L Turbo I4 (Diesel)	C	3	Did Not Finish

Tyre manufacturers
Key
Symbol	Tyre manufacturer
C	Continental
MI	Michelin
FAL	Falken Tire

United SportsCar Championship
Previous race: 12 Hours of Sebring	2014 season	Next race: Monterey Grand Prix
