= Corvette Daytona Prototype =

Prototype racing car

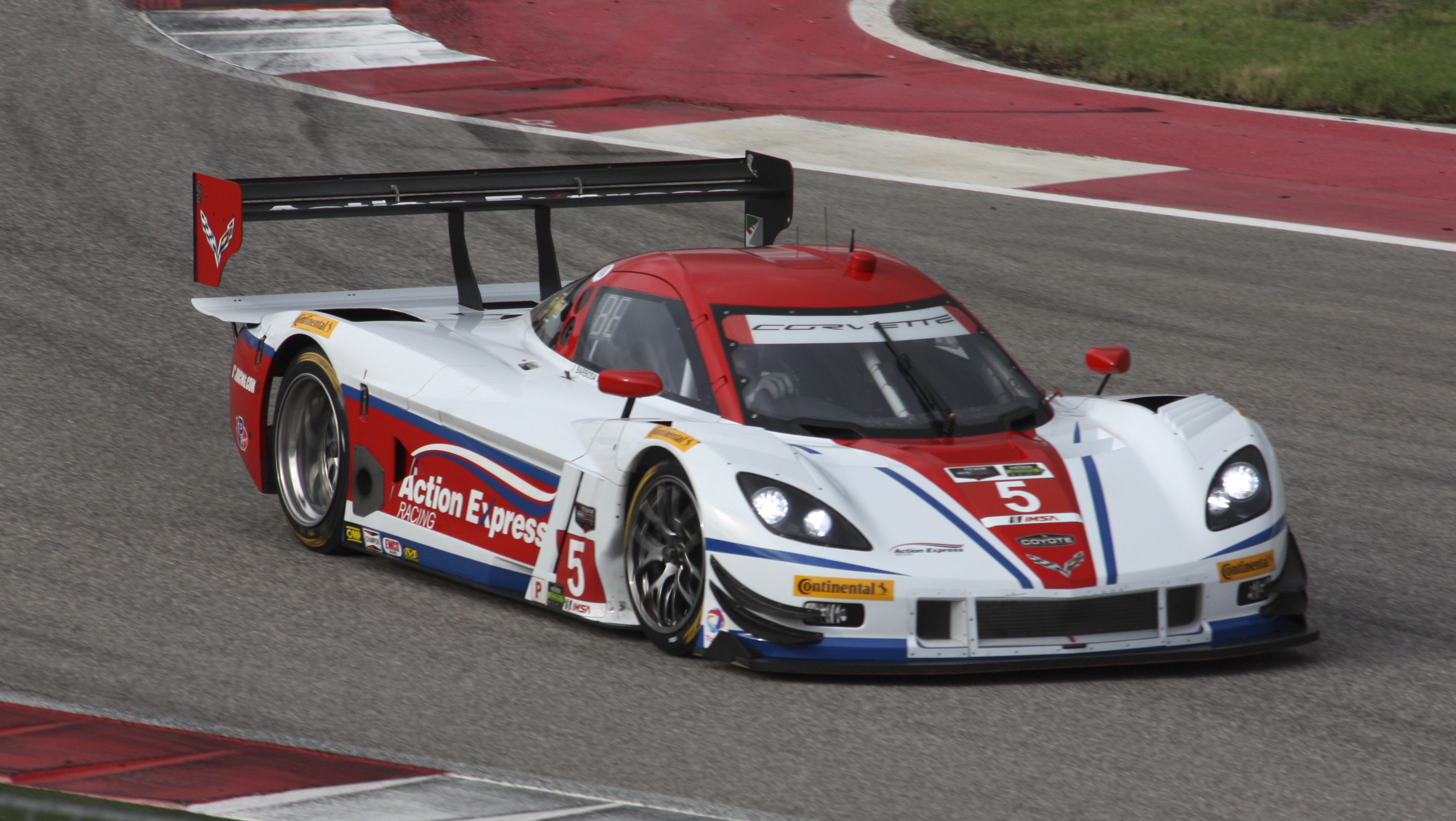
- The No. 5 Corvette Daytona Prototype of Action Express Racing competing at the 2014 Lone Star Le Mans.
- Category: Daytona Prototype DP
- Constructor: Coyote, Dallara, Riley Technologies
- Predecessor: Chevrolet Corvette GTP
- Successor: Cadillac DPi-V.R

Technical specifications
- Chassis: Dallara, Coyote or Riley built steel tube frame
- Suspension (front): Double wishbone, push-rod actuated coil springs over dampers
- Suspension (rear): Double wishbone, push-rod actuated coil springs over dampers
- Axle track: (Front) 65.25 in (1,657.3 mm) (Rear) 64.75 in (1,644.6 mm)
- Engine: ECR Engines designed, developed, and produced Chevrolet LS9 based 5.5 litre V8 naturally aspirated, mid-engined, longitudinally mounted
- Transmission: EMCO or Xtrac 5 (2012-2013) or 6 (2014 on) sequential manual (2012-2014) sequential semi-automatic (2015 onwards)
- Fuel: Sunoco (2012-2013), VP Racing Fuels (2014-2016)

Competition history
- Notable entrants: Spirit of Daytona Racing; GAINSCO/Bob Stallings Racing; Action Express Racing; Wayne Taylor Racing
- Debut: 2012 Rolex 24 at Daytona
- First win: 2012 Porsche 250
- Last win: 2016 Lone Star Le Mans
- Last event: 2016 Petit Le Mans
Races	Wins	Poles	F/Laps
45	30	25	19
- Constructors' Championships: 4
- Drivers' Championships: 3

The Corvette Daytona Prototype is a prototype racing car that began competing in the Rolex series in North America in 2012. It marked Chevrolet's return to Daytona racing as a full constructor, not just as an engine manufacturer. Previously, General Motors had competed in Rolex Sports Car Series under the Pontiac brand as well, but shelved that program when they discontinued the Pontiac brand for the 2010 season.

The car raced in Grand-Am competition from 2012 through 2013 as a Daytona Prototype and then continued in the P class in the IMSA Tudor SportsCar Championship Series, now called the WeatherTech SportsCar Championship.

With the change to IMSA racing, the car was updated to compete against ex-ALMS P2 cars. These included carbon brakes, carbon clutch, large rear diffuser (not part of Grand-Am rules), dual element rear wing, and other aerodynamic upgrades. For 2015, an aesthetic upgrade included a C7 style grille, headlights, and taillights.

The 5.5 L port injected LS based GM small-block engine was built by ECR Engines and features individual throttle bodies and a dry sump oil system.

== Results summary ==
=== Complete IMSA SportsCar Championship results ===
(key) Races in bold indicates pole position. Races in italics indicates fastest lap. (key) Races in bold indicates pole position. Races in italics indicates fastest lap.

Year	Entrant	Class	Drivers	No.	Rds.	Rounds											Pts.	Pos.
Year	Entrant	Class	Drivers	No.	Rds.	1	2	3	4	5	6	7	8	9	10	11	Pts.	Pos.
2014	(United States) Action Express Racing	P	(Portugal) João Barbosa (Brazil) Christian Fittipaldi (France) Sébastien Bourdais (United States) Burt Frisselle	5	All; All; 1-2, 11; 6	DAY; 1	SEB; 3	LBH; 3	LGA; 4	DET; 6	WGL; 3	MOS; 4	IMS; 1	ELK; 1	COA; 3	PET; 2	349	1st
2014	(United States) Action Express Racing	P	(United States) Brian Frisselle (United States) Burt Frisselle (France) Fabien Giroix (Australia) John Martin (United States) Jon Fogarty	9	1-2, 6, 11; 1-2, 6, 11; 1; 1; 2, 6, 11	DAY; 3	SEB; 8	LBH	LGA	DET	WGL; 4	MOS	IMS	ELK	COA	PET; 10	106	13th
2014	(United States) Wayne Taylor Racing	P	(United States) Jordan Taylor (United States) Ricky Taylor (Italy) Max Angelelli (South Africa) Wayne Taylor	10	All; All; 1-2, 6, 11; 1	DAY; 2	SEB; 7	LBH; 2	LGA; 2	DET; 1	WGL; 5	MOS; 3	IMS; 4	ELK; 10	COA; 7	PET; 1	330	2nd
2014	(United States) Marsh Racing	P	(United States) Eric Curran (United States) Boris Said (Italy) Max Papis (United Kingdom) Bradley Smith (United States) Guy Cosmo (United States) Burt Frisselle	31	All; 1-7, 10-11; 1, 11; 2, 6; 8-9	DAY; 10	SEB; 12	LBH; 10	LGA; 6	DET; 10	WGL; 6	MSP; DNS	IMS; 11	ELK; 5	COA; 8	PET; 5	237	9th
2014	(United States) Spirit of Daytona Racing	P	(Canada) Michael Valiante (United Kingdom) Richard Westbrook (Germany) Mike Rockenfeller	90	All; All; 1-2, 11	DAY; 4	SEB; 10	LBH; 5	LGA; 5	**DET**; 2	WGL; 1	MOS; 2	IMS; 3	ELK; 4	COA; 6	PET; 7	318	3rd
2014	(United States) GAINSCO/Bob Stallings Racing	P	(United States) Jon Fogarty (United States) Memo Gidley (United States) Alex Gurney (United States) Darren Law	99	1; 1; 1; 1	**DAY**; **18**	SEB	LBH	LGA	DET	WGL	MOS	IMS	ELK	COA	PET; 10	14	18th
2015	(United States) Action Express Racing	P	(Portugal) João Barbosa (Brazil) Christian Fittipaldi (France) Sébastien Bourdais (Italy) Max Papis	5	All; All; 1-2, 10; 6	DAY; 2	SEB; 1	LBH; 5	LGA; 4	BEL; 3	WGL; 3	MOS; 5	ELK; 2	COA; 6	PET; 1		309	1st
2015	(United States) Action Express Racing	P	(United States) Dane Cameron (United States) Eric Curran (Italy) Max Papis (United Kingdom) Phil Keen	31	All; All; 1-2, 6, 10; 1	DAY; 4	SEB; 5	LBH; 4	LGA; 5	DET; 1	WGL; 4	MOS; 2	ELK; 1	COA; 5	PET; 3		304	3rd
2015	(United States) Wayne Taylor Racing	P	(United States) Jordan Taylor (United States) Ricky Taylor (Italy) Max Angelelli	10	All; All; 1-2, 6, 10	DAY; 16	SEB; 2	LBH; 1	**LGA**; 2	DET; 6	WGL; 6	MOS; 1	ELK; 8	COA; 2	PET; 4		292	5th
2015	(United States) VisitFlorida.com Racing	P	(Canada) Michael Valiante (United Kingdom) Richard Westbrook (Germany) Mike Rockenfeller (United States) Guy Cosmo	90	All; All; 1-2, 10; 1	DAY; 3	SEB; 3	LBH; 3	LGA; 1	DET; 5	WGL; 1	MOS; 4	ELK; 5	COA; 3	**PET**; 5		306	2nd
2016	(United States) Action Express Racing	P	(Portugal) João Barbosa (Brazil) Christian Fittipaldi (Portugal) Filipe Albuquerque (United States) Scott Pruett	5	All; All; 1-2, 6, 10; 1-2	DAY; 4	SEB; 3	**LBH**; **2**	LGA; 7	**DET**; **2**	WGL; 1	MOS; 2	ELK; 2	COA; 3	PET; 5		311	2nd
2016	(United States) Action Express Racing	P	(United States) Dane Cameron (United States) Eric Curran (France) Simon Pagenaud (United Kingdom) Jonathan Adam (United States) Scott Pruett (Portugal) Filipe Albuquerque	31	All; All; 1, 10; 1; 2; 6	DAY; 6	SEB; 2	LBH; 3	LGA; 3	DET; 6	WGL; 2	MOS; 1	ELK; 1	COA; 2	PET; 4		314	1st
2016	(United States) Wayne Taylor Racing	P	(United States) Jordan Taylor (United States) Ricky Taylor (Italy) Max Angelelli (Brazil) Rubens Barrichello	10	All; All; 1-2, 6, 10; 1-2	DAY; 2	SEB; 12	LBH; 1	LGA; 6	DET; 1	WGL; 4	MOS; 3	ELK; 3	COA; 1	PET; 3		309	3rd
2016	(United States) VisitFlorida Racing	P	(Belgium) Marc Goossens (United States) Ryan Hunter-Reay (United Kingdom) Ryan Dalziel	90	All; 1-3, 10; 1-2, 4-10	DAY; 3	SEB; 5	LBH; 6	LGA; 2	BET; 7	WGL; 6	MOS; 4	ELK; 6	COA; 7	PET; 7		273	5th

== See also ==
- Chevrolet Corvette GTP
- Cadillac DPi-V.R
- Daytona Prototype
