= Felix Sabates =

Cuban-born entrepreneur and philanthropist living in the United States (born 1945)

Félix Sabates Jr.
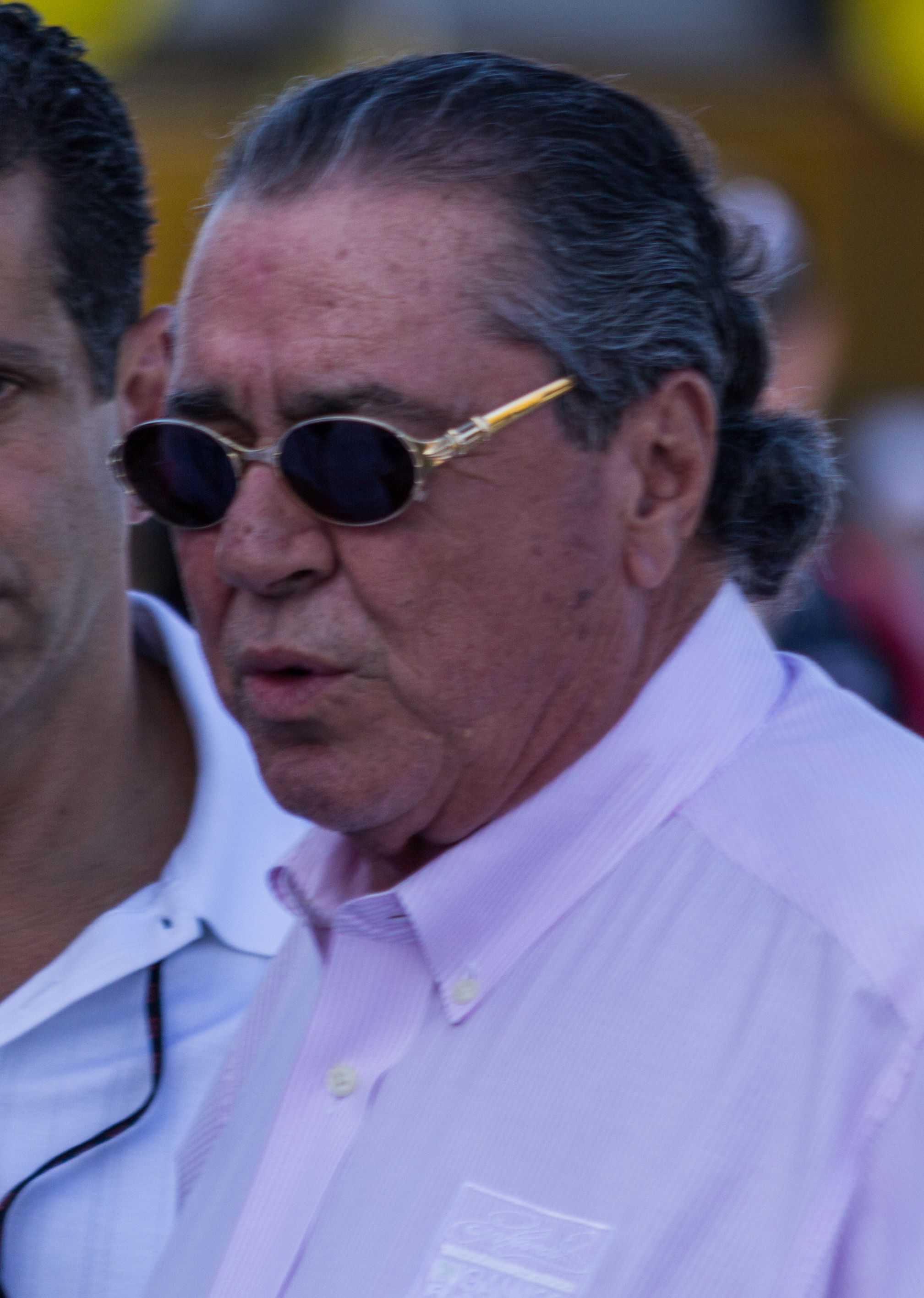
- Sabates at the 2013 Coke Zero 400
- Born: Feliciano Sergio Sabates Jr. September 9, 1945 (age 81); Camagüey, Cuba
- Occupations: Team owner, Chip Ganassi Racing with Felix Sabates

Feliciano Sergio "Félix" Sabates Jr. (born September 9, 1945) is a Cuban-born former entrepreneur, and philanthropist living in the United States of America.

He is a partner in Chip Ganassi Racing teams, which formerly fielded teams in the NASCAR Cup Series (as Chip Ganassi Racing with Felix Sabates), as well as fielding the IMSA WeatherTech SportsCar Championship, World Endurance Championship and IndyCar Series teams. Sabates previously owned SABCO Racing until the end of the 2000 season when Chip Ganassi and Sabates became partners.

== Early life ==
Felix Sabates was born in Camagüey, Cuba. Sabates is the oldest of seven children—three boys (Feliciano "Felix" Jr., Jose, Arturo "Art") and four girls (Silvia, Yoyi, Manty, Rosita)—of Dr. Feliciano Sabates and Maria Tavio. Sabates' grandfather grew sugar until a fire destroyed the business in the 1930s. Sabates' family then founded a jewelry store in 1936. The family would later found several successful business many of which bore the family name. Sabates attended military school as a teenager, first in Havana, and later in Camagüey. According to Sabates, he was a bunkmate with one of the sons of Fidel Castro.

Following the Cuban Revolution, the newly established communist government headed by Fidel Castro proceeded to nationalize many businesses and strip citizens of individual wealth; this included the assets of Sabates' family. After joining anti-Castro forces, in June 1960, at the age of 15, Felix was put on a flight to Miami by his parents. He was the first member of the family to enter the United States of America. Five of his six brothers and sisters would later arrive in the U.S. under Operation Peter Pan, sent to Albuquerque, New Mexico and placed in foster care. Sabates' mother and youngest brother Art fled in 1963, while his father arrived in 1966 after being restricted by the Castro administration.

Sabates initially settled in Boston, Massachusetts with his aunt and uncle, before moving to Columbia, Missouri. In between, Sabates lived in motels and worked several odd jobs, including washing pots and pans at a hospital. Eventually, the family would reconvene in Lexington, North Carolina (where his mother originally settled), in a resettlement site for Cuban refugees established by an American-based Catholic charity.

In Lexington, Sabates began working 12-hour shifts in a furniture factory. One year later in 1964, after an encounter with the Ku Klux Klan, his family moved to Charlotte, North Carolina, and he began working at National Car Rental as a parking lot attendant, and washing cars at the Charlotte Airport. Later, Sabates began working at the City Chevrolet car dealership in Downtown Charlotte (later purchased by fellow NASCAR owner Rick Hendrick), offering to work for free on the condition that if he outsells the other salesman within a month, that he would be compensated and offered a permanent sales position. Sabates was successful with record car sales. When a local newspaper article had recounted this story about the top salesman, it caught the eye of a local businessman who proceeded to offer him a different sales position with potential growth as a manufacturer's representative.

== Business success ==
In 1969 at the age of 25, Sabates accepted a position as a salesman for Top Sales Company, Inc. (TSC) which distributed retail products. Sabates would purchase the company in 1974. Early products distributed by TSC included Atari game consoles and Teddy Ruxpin teddy bears. At its peak, TSC became the largest, most successful manufacturer's representative company in the United States with over $12 billion in sales. In 2000, Sabates sold TSC to his employees at what was considered a well below market rate to "reward the people that helped him build the business."

In 1988, Sabates purchased a Hatteras Yacht dealership in Stuart, Fla. and within two years Sabates had turned it into the largest Hatteras dealership in the world. Sabates, along with his partner John Dane, followed that up with the purchase of superyacht builder Trinity Yachts in 2000. He also owns IYC, one of the largest yacht management, charter, brokerage and new construction yachts companies in the world, with offices in Monaco, the Bahamas, Saint Martin and the U.S. He is also the president and CEO of FSS Holdings, Inc., a North Carolina-based holding company with holdings in several U.S. and international companies.

Sabates owns and operates a Mercedes Benz dealership that is a four-time recipient of the Best Award given to only the top 10 percent of dealers nationwide. He also operates the largest volume Infiniti dealership in North Carolina as well as Hyundai, Ford, Lincoln Mazda, Sprinter and Smart Car auto dealerships. A Sabates owned Bentley dealership closed in 2015.

== Other ventures ==
=== Auto racing ===
In 1987, Sabates became a NASCAR team owner with the purchase of a Hendrick Motorsports research and development team from Charlotte businessman Rick Hendrick, who also owns Chevrolet dealerships. The team would be known as SABCO Racing. Sabates' first driver in 1989 was a third-generation racer Kyle Petty (Sabates was a huge fan of his father, Richard Petty). In 1992, Sabates' team branched out into the Busch Series Following the death of Alan Kulwicki, Sabates gained the assets of his racing team, and later sold it to Geoff Bodine which became Goeff Bodine racing. Petty found his groove in the Winston Cup circuit, finishing in the top-five in the final point standings for the season. The team fielded both cars in the Winston Cup circuit the following year and Petty again finished top-five in total points.

SABCO Racing changed to Team SABCO at the beginning of the 1996 season. Sabates expanded his operation to two teams. Drivers for SABCO included Sterling Marlin, Bobby Hillin Jr., Tommy Kendall, Kenny Irwin Jr., Kenny Wallace, Bobby Hamilton, Robby Gordon, Greg Sacks, Wally Dallenbach Jr., Joe Nemechek, Jeff Green, and Ted Musgrave.

In 2001 Sabates partnered with Chip Ganassi to become Chip Ganassi Racing with Felix Sabates. Ganassi would purchase an 80 percent stake in the team, with Sabates retaining the remaining 20 percent. Later on, he became responsible for hiring the first Latino driver in NASCAR's Sprint Cup Series in 2006, former Indy 500 champion Juan Pablo Montoya. Prior to the 2009 NASCAR Sprint Cup season, due to financial woes, the team merged with Dale Earnhardt, Inc. to form Earnhardt Ganassi Racing. The team would revert to the Ganassi Racing name in 2014.

As of 2021, the team's drivers include Kurt Busch in the No. 1 car and Ross Chastain in the No. 42. In his nearly 30 seasons in the NASCAR Sprint Cup Series, Sabates' teams have 17 wins, 131 top-five and 354 top-10 finishes as well as 40 poles in nearly 1800 starts. His team made the Chase for the Monster Energy NASCAR Cup Series four times (2009, 2015 and 2016 (2)), finished in the top five in points in three different seasons and won the 2010 Daytona 500 and Brickyard 400. In addition, Sabates and Ganassi also fielded a Daytona Prototype in the Grand-Am Rolex Sports Car Series for 13 years, where the team won an unprecedented six Rolex 24 At Daytonas and seven championships. Their No. 01 team is the winningest team in series history with 40 victories. Past drivers include Luis Diaz, Stefan Johansson and Cort Wagner. In 2016 the sports car team began racing the new Ford GT in both IMSA and in the World Endurance Championship and would ultimately go on to win the 24 Hours of Le Mans that year – exactly 50 years after Ford beat Ferrari for the first time in 1966.

=== Charlotte sports ===
In 1988, Sabates became one of the founding owners of the original Charlotte Hornets basketball team. Sabates played an intricate part negotiating with the NBA to grant franchise rights to Charlotte. Sabates sold his interests in 1991. After starting the first professional indoor soccer league in the 1980s, he was one of the first investors in the World Football League. Also in the 1990s, he established The Charlotte Professional Sports Team, Inc, along with Hornets executive Carl Scheer, and his NASCAR driver, Kyle Petty, and his father Richard Petty. The company returned professional hockey to Charlotte for the first time since 1977, when the ECHL placed the Charlotte Checkers expansion franchise in Charlotte for 1993. In 1996, the Checkers won the Jack Riley Cup championship after competing in the ECHL for just three years. Soon after, the team was sold at a then-record price for a minor-league professional franchise, to Tim Braswell, who sold the team in 2000 to George Shinn and Ray Woolridge, the Hornets owners. Sabates and Carl Scheer would buy back the team in 2002. In November 2005, the Checkers hit an all-time attendance record of 10,894.

Sabates is also the only person that had ownership in the Hornets in the 1980s/1990s to now also have an ownership stake with Michael Jordan in the Charlotte Hornets franchise in the 2010s.

In July 2016, the NBA announced that it was removing the 2017 All-Star game from Charlotte due to North Carolina's controversial Public Facilities Privacy & Security Act, also known as House Bill 2 or HB2. The Charlotte Observer obtained a letter from Sabates blaming Charlotte's City Council for losing the game, which was projected to have a $100 million impact on the state. His letter reportedly stated:

"Our Mayor opened a can of worms, who knows why? Our city council is the one to blame for our losing the NBA All Star game, none of this would have happened if not for a very few minorities forcing our supposed city leaders into creating a problem that never really existed. There will always be another election, they better pray a very few can get them re-elected. What is wrong with a person using a bathroom provided for the sex the [sic] were born with, if you want to change your gender so be it, we are a free county, but don't force 8 years old children to be exposed to having to share bathroom facilities with people that don't share the organs they were Bourne [sic] with, this is plain wrong, this could cause irreparable damages to children [sic] that don't understand why they have to see what God did not mean for them to witness, we have some very confused business as well as political humans that frankly have made this a political issue rather then [sic] moral issues, SHAME ON THEM."

== Civic leader ==
In addition to his successes in sports, Sabates also focuses much attention on civic activities. Sabates has served on the board of directors for Carolinas Health Care Systems for the past 27 years. He also serves on the board of directors for the University of North Carolina at Charlotte, the Applica Corporation, Simpson Products, the Charlotte Chamber of Commerce and he also was the co-chair of a North Carolina Institute of Medicine Task Force on Latino Health. Additionally Sabates was appointed to two terms on the North Carolina Banking Commission. In fact, he has been appointed to commissions by three different North Carolina governors, Jim Martin (R), Mike Easley (D) and most recently by Governor Pat McCrory (R) to vice chairman of the Oversight committee of the Airport Authority of North Carolina which oversees the Charlotte airport, the sixth busiest in the world.

== Philanthropist ==
Sabates is also well known for his many philanthropic contributions and has received several honors and awards for his work. Belmont Abbey College in North Carolina has named its dining hall after him, Elon College and UNC Charlotte bestowed upon him Honorary Doctorate degrees, and he received a "Special Blessing" in writing from Pope John Paul II. Sabates became a member of the philanthropic Dream Makers Society of the Boys and Girls Club of Broward County, Florida, in recognition of his 12-year commitment to and support of special fund raising events. In his honor, the Felix Sabates Athletic Center was dedicated in Fort Lauderdale, Florida, in November 2000. The facility is the largest Boys and Girls Club in the state. He is also a large contributor to the North Carolina Health Care System Foundation, the Allegro Foundation to benefit children with special needs, as well as the Levine Children's Hospital that bears a special plaque in his honor is in the main lobby.

== Political affiliation ==
Sabates is a member of the Republican Party. He supports local Republicans, and has supported most Republican presidential nominees since the 1970s. Sabates was also appointed by Governor Jim Martin as a commissioner of the North Carolina State Banking Commission. Sabates did not support Republican candidate Donald Trump's campaigns for president in 2016 and 2020.

== Personal life ==
Sabates has three children and six grandchildren. His daughter Mimi is married to former NHRA driver Doug Herbert.

On August 2, 2014, Sabates' 18-year-old grandson Feliciano "Chany Boy" Sabates IV was fatally shot at a party in Palm Beach Gardens, Florida.

== See also ==
- Chip Ganassi Racing
- Scott Dixon
