= Sahlen's =

American meat packing company

Sahlen Packing Company Inc.
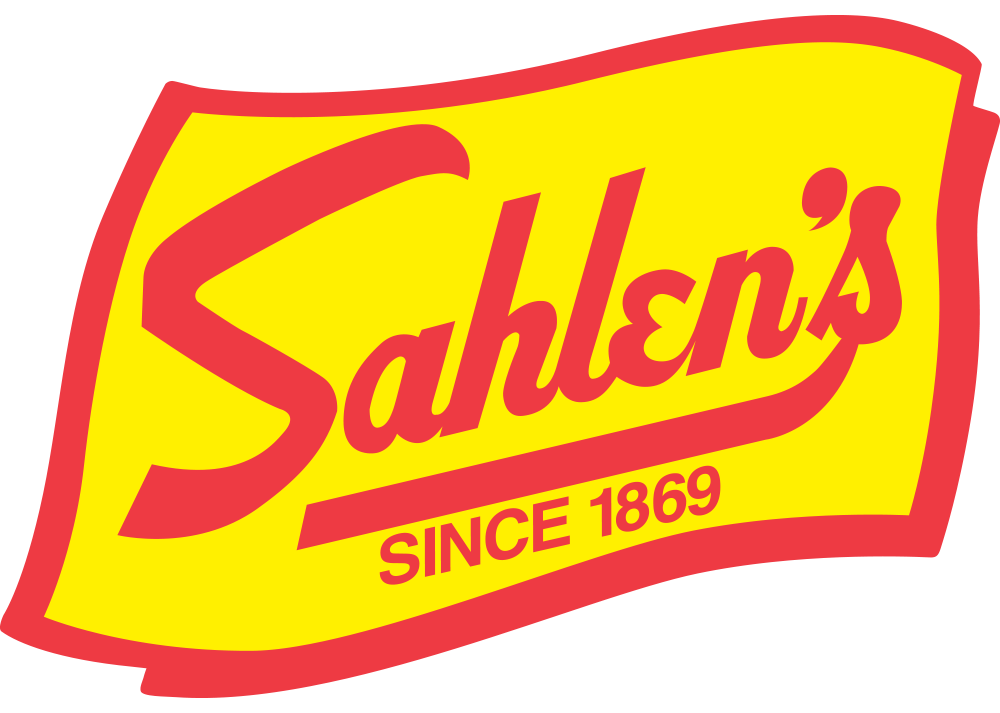
- Type: Private
- Industry: Food Packing
- Founded: 1869
- Founder: Joseph Sahlen
- Headquarters: Buffalo, New York, United States
- Products: Hot Dogs, Ham, Turkey, Sausage, Chicken Breast, Hot Ham and other deli items.
- Owner: Joe Sahlen
- Number of employees: 80-100
- Website: sahlen.com

Sahlen Packing Company Inc. or Sahlen's (/ˌseɪlɪnz/ SAY-linz), is an American meat packing company headquartered in Buffalo, New York. The company was founded by Joseph Sahlen in 1869. Sahlen's specializes in smokehouse deli meats (ham, turkey, chicken, hot ham) as well as hot dogs and sausages. Sahlen's products can be found in over 30 states across the US.

== Sporting facilities ==
On October 9, 2018, Sahlen's bought the naming rights to Sahlen Field, a baseball park located in downtown Buffalo, New York, which hosts the Buffalo Bisons minor league baseball team.

On February 10, 2011, Sahlen's bought the five-year naming rights to Sahlen's Stadium a soccer-specific stadium in Rochester, New York. In October 2015, the stadium operators announced that they would not exercise the option to continue the existing naming agreement with Sahlen's, but would instead seek a new agreement. In the interim, the stadium reverted to being known as Rochester Rhinos Stadium.

Sahlen's also owns Sahlen's Sports Park, a 180,000-square-foot multi-sport public indoor facility with three open fields, one boarded field, a fitness center and cafe located in Elma, New York.
