= Leh Keen =

American racing driver

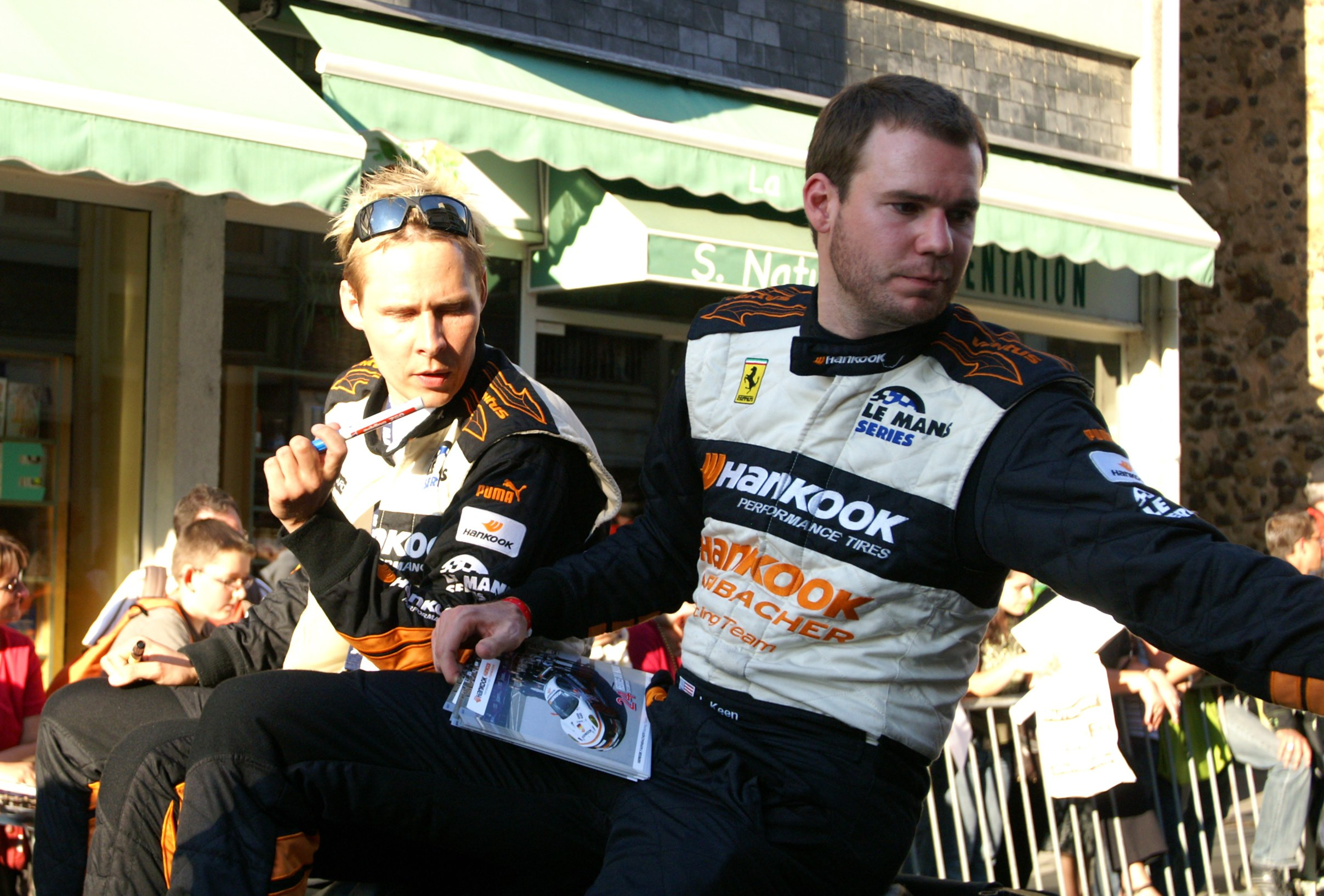
- Allan Simonsen and Leh Keen
- Nationality: (United States) American
- Born: July 22, 1983 (age 43) Dublin, Georgia, United States

United SportsCar Championship career
- Debut season: 2004
- Current team: Alex Job Racing, WeatherTech
- Categorisation: FIA Gold
- Car number: 22
- Former teams: Dempsey Racing, Brumos Racing, Synergy Racing, Farnbacher-Loles, Shoes for Crews
- Starts: 144
- Wins: 14
- Podiums: 44
- Poles: 10
- Fastest laps: 6

Championship titles
- 2009 Rolex Sports Car Series Championship Class: GT teammate: Dirk Werner; 2012 American Le Mans Series Championship Class: GTC teammate: Cooper MacNeil

Lehman McGrath Keen III (born July 22, 1983) is an American racecar driver born in Dublin, Georgia, who competes in the United SportsCar Championship. He most recently drove the No. 22 Alex Job Racing WeatherTech Porsche 911 GT America in the United SportsCar Championship GTD class with co-driver Cooper MacNeil.

== 2004 ==
Keen moved into the Rolex Sports Car Series in 2004. He captured two podiums in the three races that he entered with the Autometrics Motorsports Super Grand Sport SGS class Porsche. His best finishes of the season were third-place finishes at Virginia International Raceway and Barber Motorsports Park.

== 2005 ==
Keen ran the entire Rolex Sports Car Series schedule in 2005 and scored his first professional win at the Six Hours of Watkins Glen at Watkins Glen International Raceway. He drove for Autometrics once again in 2005. He started the season with a sixth-place finish at the Rolex 24 at Daytona and ended the year in fifth place in Rolex Sports Car Series points along with co-driver Cory Friedman. His Autometrics Motorsports team finished third for the season in team points. He had one win at the Six Hours of Watkins Glen and 11 top-ten finishes. Keen also raced in the GT2 class of the American Le Mans Series, driving the No. 79 J3 Porsche GT3 RSR in the Petit Le Mans at Road Atlanta, where he finished sixth.

== 2006 ==
Keen drove the Shoes for Crews No. 80 Porsche 997 GT3 Cup car with David Murry for series defending champion Synergy Racing for the 2006 season. He had a podium finish in Autodromo Hermanos Rodriguez Mexico City and another at Infineon Raceway. Overall, he finished sixth in Rolex GT points for the seasons. His best finish of the season was second at Mexico City.

== 2007 ==
Keen began a three-year stint driving the #85 Porsche GT3 GT3 with Farnbacher-Loles, sponsored by Shoes for Crews and Recaro. During the 2007 Rolex 24 hours at Daytona, Keen was one of four drivers to drive the number 85 car. The car led the GT class for the first 22.5 hours - however, they failed to finish the race due to engine failure. At the second race of the year in Mexico City, Keen finished second with co-driver Dominik Farnbacher. An injury at Mid Ohio Sportscar Course cut his season short but he returned for the final race of the season at Salt Lake City. There, he won the pole and finished with a second place podium. He finished 24th in Rolex GT points on 2007. Keen also competed in time attack racing when he piloted GSC's Unlimited Class Mitsubishi Lancer Evolution and Modified class Toyota Supra in the Redline Time Attack Series. He also drove in the Car & Driver One Lap of America competition, driving GSC's Modified Class Toyota Supra.

== 2008 ==
Keen continued his stint with Farnbacher-Loles in the Grand-Am Rolex Series where he finished ninth in GT points, with one win (in the rain) at the Mid-Ohio Sports Car Course. He had five top five finishes and one pole.

== 2009 ==
Keen captured three pole positions and four wins on his way to his first Grand American Rolex GT Championship. His co-driver Dirk Werner and he clinched the championship with 359 points each. They both finished the season with seven podiums (one wins, one second and two third). He won a season high four races: New Jersey, Mid Ohio, Daytona & Watkins Glen - including three in succession. Keen also scored three poles.

== 2010 ==
Keen got a full-time drive with #41 Mazda RX-8 for Dempsey Racing in the Rolex Sports Car Series and took the team's Mazda to their first and only win ever with co-driver James Gue at Watkins Glen International Raceway. He also drove a Porsche for Alex Job Racing at the 12 Hours of Sebring in the American LeMans Series. At Sebring, he scored a pole, the ten fastest race laps and a victory. Keen also raced in Europe for Farnbacher Racing in a Ferrari 430. He scored a class win and second overall at the 24 Hours of Nurburgring in Germany and a second place overall in the GT PRO class at the 24 Hours of LeMans in France.

== 2011 ==
Keen changed teams again in the Grand American Rolex GT Series but this time he was driving the famous #59 Porsche 911 GT3 for Brumos Racing from Jacksonville, Florida with co-driver Andrew Davis. The pairing took their first win together at the 2011 Six Hours of Watkins Glen and scored their second win of the season at Laguna Seca Raceway in California. Keen, Davis and Brumos Racing went on to win the 2011 Grand Am Rolex GT Championship for 2011. The championship came in the first year of Brumos' return to its historic GT roots. Keen also drove in the American LeMans Series where his teammate was Bill Sweedler. Keen and teammate Sweedler ran a flawless race during the inaugural Baltimore Grand Prix and maintained a second-place position throughout the race. The drivers and team scored multiple podiums for the Alex Job Race team including a second place finish at the final race of the season - Petit LeMans. The 2011 Rolex Series GT champion with Andrew Davis for Brumos Racing was Keen's second championship in three years. Keen also drove for Farnbacher Racing in Europe at the 24 Hours of LeMans in France.

== 2012 ==
For 2012, Keen returned with Brumos Racing with co-driver Andrew Davis in the team's famous No. 59 Porsche 911 GT3 in the Rolex GT Sports Car Series. Keen was also signed by Alex Job Racing with a full ride with teammate Cooper MacNeil in the WeatherTech Porsche in the American LeMans Series. During the 12 Hours of Sebring, Keen and his teammates led a strong battle throughout the race. He encountered minor hiccups and climbed one spot to a second-place finish. At Long Beach, California, Keen had a consistent podium battle - Lost the lead halfway through on pit stop and never regained the top position. Keen won pole at Lime Rock Park and Co-driver Cooper MacNeil started the Porsche and kept the team in the top three before handing the car to Leh who, despite several on-track run ins, brings the car home in first place. Leh qualified car in third at Canadian Tire Motorsport Park. Cooper MacNeil starts the car and has an excellent run, handing the car over to Keen in the GTC lead. Keen dices with the #66 Porsche and the No. 11 Porsche before finishing second. Keen and Cooper struggle with brake issues early at Mid-Ohio Sports Car Course and finish a respectable fourth. Cooper started car in second at Baltimore and hands off to Keen still running second. Keen led briefly, but finished second. Cooper and Keen ran in top three for duration of Virginia International Raceway (VIR) race, leading multiple times. Keen took the lead on final lap when #11 JDX car must pit for fuel. The win sealed GTC driver championship for Cooper and team championship for Alex Job Racing with one race remaining in the season. Keen's third championship in four years. In the Rolex Sports Car Series, Keen and Andrew finished eighth in GT points with four third-place finishes, including podiums at the Rolex 24 At Daytona and Indianapolis Motor Speedway.

== 2016 ==
After the Canadian Tire Motorsports Park round of the 2016 IMSA WeatherTech Series schedule, Leh was released by Alex Job Racing, and replaced with Porsche Junior driver Sven Mueller. Team owner Alex Job cited off track circumstances as the reason for Keen's departure. At the time of dismissal, Keen sat eighth in driver standings, tied with co-driver Cooper MacNeil.

== Indoor speed world record ==
In February 2021, Keen broke the Guinness World Records for the fastest speed achieved by a vehicle indoors by hitting 102.65mph/165.20kmh inside the New Orleans Convention Center in Louisiana, USA in a Porsche Taycan Turbo S. The record was last set in February 2013 by Mikko Hirvonen driving a Crosskart Speed Car XTRM inside the Helsinki Expo Centre in Helsinki, Finland by hitting 86.99mph/140kmh. Keen's record was broken in July 2023 by then-McLaren Formula E driver Jake Hughes driving a modified version of the Formula E Gen 3 electric formula race car called the GENBETA, hitting 135.9mph/218.71kmh inside the ExCeL Centre in London, England.

== Racing record ==
Year	Races	Wins	Podiums	Pole position	American Le Mans Series points	Rolex Sports Car Series points	United SportsCar Championship points
2014	3	0	1	0	0	0	295
2013	16	1	5	1	10	277	0
2012	21	2	10	2	141	329	0
2011	18	2	6	2	79	319	0
2010	18	3	7	1	30	311	0
2009	12	4	7	3	0	359	0
2008	13	1	2	1	0	274	0
2007	8	0	2	0	0	0	0
2006	13	0	2	0	0	363	0
2005	15	1	1	0	0	333	0
2004	3	0	2	0	0	0	0

=== 24 Hours of Le Mans results ===
Year	Team	Co-Drivers	Car	Class	Laps	Pos.	Class Pos.
2010	(Germany) Hankook Team Farnbacher	(Germany) Dominik Farnbacher (Denmark) Allan Simonsen	Ferrari F430 GTC	GT2	336	12th	2nd
2011	(Germany) Hankook Team Farnbacher	(Germany) Dominik Farnbacher (Denmark) Allan Simonsen	Ferrari 458 Italia GT2	GTE; Pro	137	DNF	DNF
2016	(Germany) Proton Competition	(United States) Marc Miller	Porsche 911 RSR	GTE; Am	50	DNF	DNF
