= Spirit of Daytona Racing =

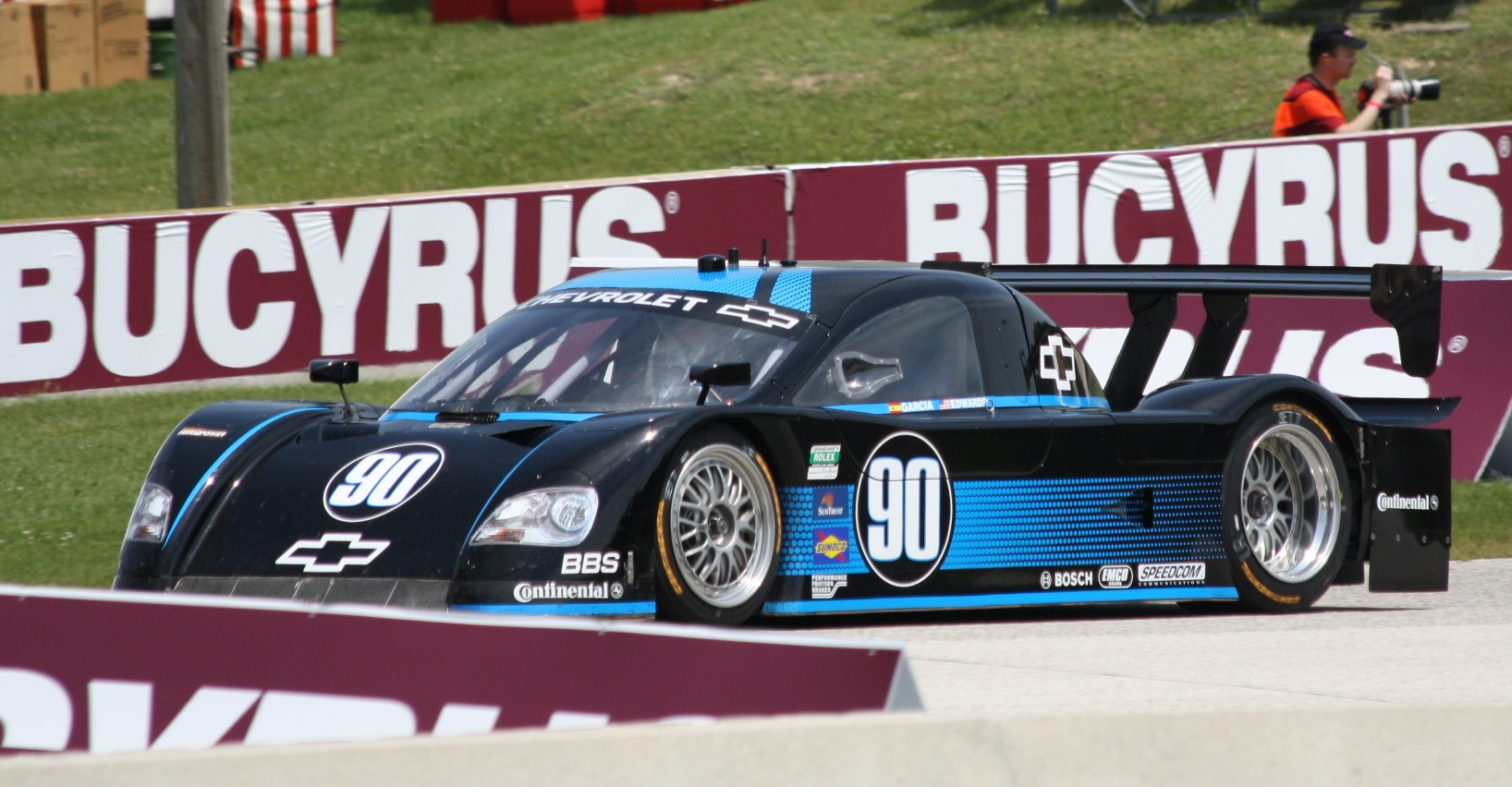
2011 Rolex Sports Car Series Daytona Prototype

Spirit of Daytona Racing (known as Visit Florida Racing from 2015 to 2018) was an auto racing team that competed last in the IMSA WeatherTech SportsCar Championship Prototype Class with the No. 90 Cadillac DPi-V.R, driven by Tristan Vautier, Matt McMurry and Eddie Cheever III.

== History ==
Spirit of Daytona was founded in 1987 by owner Troy Flis. The team is based in Daytona Beach, Florida where they have an 8,000-square-foot (740 m^{2}) shop. The team originally started racing in the number 16 Crown Royal Cask Volkswagen. The team has competed in every season of the Rolex Sports Car Series since the series was created in early 2000. The team won 16 Grand Am series races. They have also won a pair of Grand Am Series Team Championships in 2000 and 2001. They won a Grand Am Drivers Championship in 2001. They also won their class in the 2002 24 Hours of Daytona. The team's two main drivers are 2004 Indianapolis 500 winner Buddy Rice, and Antonio García, who was part of the Brumos Porsche team that won the 2009 24 Hours of Daytona. Spirit of Daytona finished 8th in the 2010 Rolex Sports Car Series points. In 2010 they had nine top-tens, and four top-five finishes.

Antonio García and Richard Westbrook joined the Spirit of Daytona team during the 2012 Rolex Sports Car Series season. The team won overall at the 2012 Barber Motorsports Park race in a Corvette Daytona Prototype. The team also won at Mid-Ohio with drivers Westbrook and Michael Valiante. Afterward, Garcia would leave to join the Corvette factory team, his replacement being Jordan Taylor, son of Rolex 24 Hours at Daytona winner Wayne Taylor. Although Taylor and Westbrook would not win, during Grand-Am's final year, the duo had a best finish of third and finished 97% of the laps.

In 2014, Grand-Am merged with the American Le Mans Series to form the Tudor United SportsCar Championship. Taylor left to join his father's team, being replaced by Michael Valiante. The duo combined for three podiums as well as their sole victory at the 6 Hours of the Glen en route to third in the championship. The following year saw the team take its second consecutive 6 Hours at the Glen victory along with the win at Laguna Seca, and a runner-up at the Rolex 24. Despite Valiante and Westbrook finishing second in points, both drivers were released in favor of Marc Goossens and Scotsman Ryan Dalziel. Of note, Goossens raced with 2012 IndyCar Series champion Ryan Hunter-Reay at Long Beach due to Dalziel driving for Tequila Patrón ESM in the FIA World Endurance Championship. Against the dominant Action Express and Wayne Taylor Racing entries, VFR saw the podium twice, at Daytona and Laguna Seca, and Goossens finished 5th in the final standing.

For 2018, the team renewed its partnership with General Motors and Cadillac by becoming the third IMSA team to race the Cadillac DPi-V.R in the Prototype category after Wayne Taylor Racing and Action Express Racing. Van der Zande departed SDR to replace Ricky Taylor in the No. 10. SDR hired former IndyCar Series driver Tristan Vautier and European Le Mans Series and North American Endurance Championship driver Matt McMurry for their first full-time seasons in Prototype and Eddie Cheever III for the Rolex 24 at Daytona and 12 Hours of Sebring races. The team struggled in the first half of the season. The No. 90 failed to finish the Rolex 24 due to an engine misfire. At Sebring, Vautier qualified on pole but in hour 11 of the race, he crashed into the Turn 17 barriers on his first lap after climbing back into the car, damaging the tub beyond repair and forcing the team to miss the following two rounds at Long Beach and Mid-Ohio. The team returned for Round 5 at the Detroit Grand Prix but again retired, this time due to a gearbox failure. Misfortune continued at the Sahlen's Six Hours of the Glen, where Vautier spun after making contact with another prototype on the first lap. The car was hit by a third prototype, forcing the car into a closed pit lane for repairs, and resulting in a time penalty. The team managed to reach the checkered flag for the first time all season, finishing 11th. A lack of funding began to impact the team, preventing it from competing at the Canadian Tire Motorsport Park and at Road America. The team planned to return at or before the season finale, Road Atlanta's Petit Le Mans but did not.

In late 2019 rumors speculated that the team now back under its original name would purchase a Mazda RT24-P from the factory Mazda team but nothing came from the speculations.

The Team now builds cars for the Mazda Global MX 5 Cup.

== WeatherTech SportsCar Championship wins ==
#	Season	Date	Classes	Track / Race	No.	Winning drivers	Chassis	Engine
1	2014	June 29	Prototype	Watkins Glen	90	(Canada) Michael Valiante / (United Kingdom) Richard Westbrook	Coyote Corvette DP	Chevrolet 5.5L V8
2	2015	May 3	Prototype	Laguna Seca	90	(Canada) Michael Valiante / (United Kingdom) Richard Westbrook	Coyote Corvette DP	Chevrolet 5.5L V8
3	2015	June 28	Prototype	Watkins Glen	90	(Canada) Michael Valiante / (United Kingdom) Richard Westbrook	Coyote Corvette DP	Chevrolet 5.5L V8
4	2017	September 24	Prototype	Laguna Seca	90	(Belgium) Marc Goossens / (Netherlands) Renger van der Zande	Ligier JS P217	Gibson GK428 4.2 L V8
