= 2013 SFP Grand Prix =

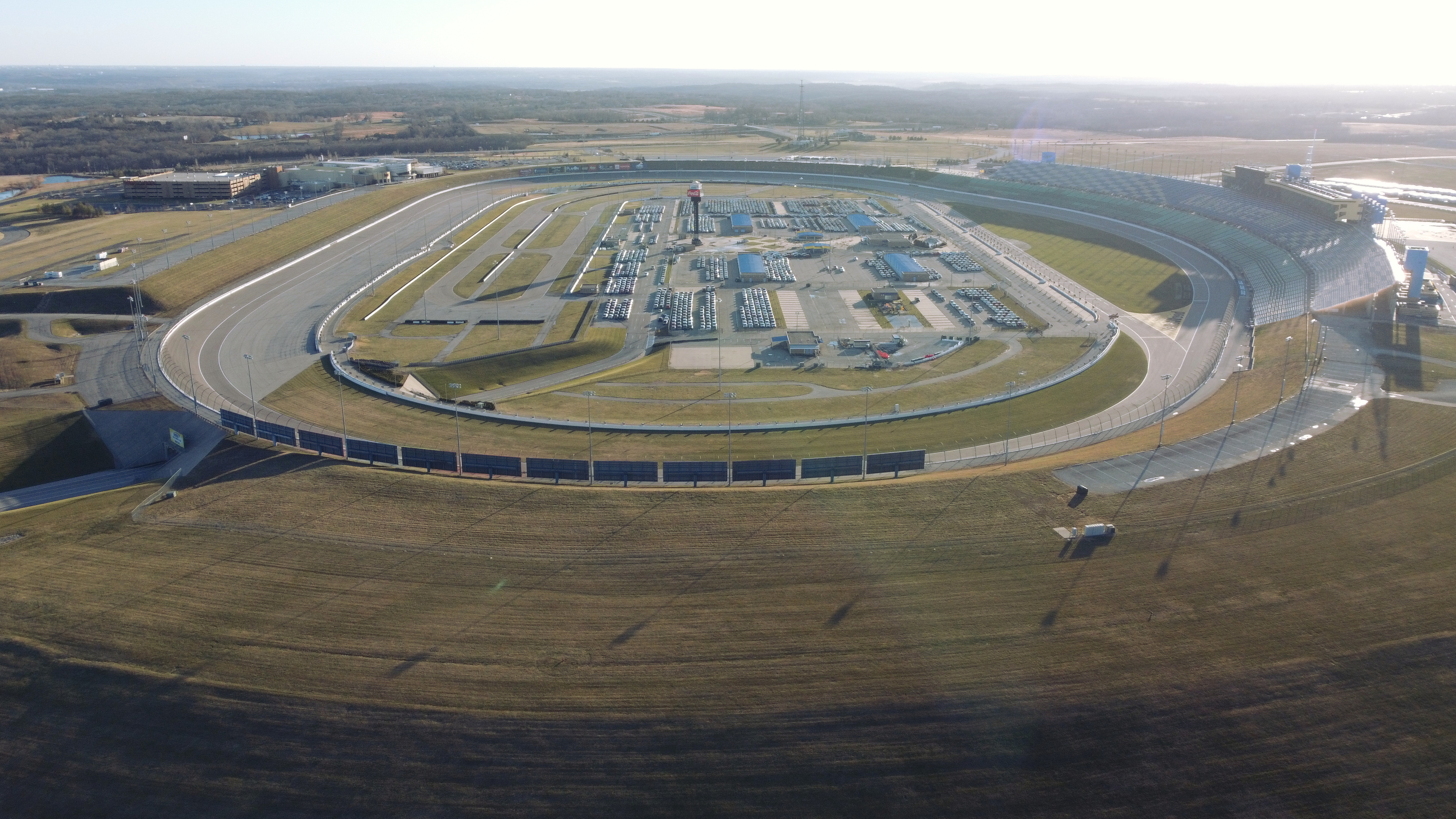
Kansas Speedway seen from above

The 2013 SFP Grand Prix was the tenth race of 2013 Rolex Sports Car Series season. It took place at Kansas Speedway on August 17, 2013.

== Entry list ==
Entry List
No.	Team	Car	Driver 1	Driver 2	Driver 3
DP
01	Chip Ganassi Racing with Felix Sabates	Riley-BMW	(United States) Scott Pruett	(Mexico) Memo Rojas	
2	Starworks Motorsport	Riley-BMW	(United Kingdom) Ryan Dalziel	(Venezuela) Alex Popow	
3	8Star Motorsports	Corvette DP	(Venezuela) Enzo Potolicchio	(Canada) Michael Valiante	(France) Stéphane Sarrazin
4	8Star Motorsports	Corvette DP	(Venezuela) Emilio DiGuida	(France) Sébastien Bourdais	
5	Action Express Racing	Corvette DP	(Brazil) Christian Fittipaldi	(Portugal) João Barbosa	
6	Michael Shank Racing	Riley-Ford	(Colombia) Gustavo Yacamán	(United Kingdom) Justin Wilson	
8	Starworks Motorsport	Riley-BMW	(United States) Scott Mayer	(New Zealand) Brendon Hartley	
9	Action Express Racing	Corvette DP	(United States) Brian Frisselle	(United States) Burt Frisselle	
10	Wayne Taylor Racing	Corvette DP	(Italy) Max Angelelli	(United States) Jordan Taylor	
42	Team Sahlen	Riley-BMW	(United States) Dane Cameron	(United States) Wayne Nonnamaker	
43	Team Sahlen	Riley-BMW	(United States) Joe Nonnamaker	(United States) Will Nonnamaker	
60	Michael Shank Racing	Riley-Ford	(Brazil) Oswaldo Negri Jr.	(United States) John Pew	
90	Spirit of Daytona Racing	Corvette DP	(United States) Ricky Taylor	(United Kingdom) Richard Westbrook	
99	GAINSCO/Bob Stallings Racing	Corvette DP	(United States) Jon Fogarty	(United States) Alex Gurney	
GT
31	Marsh Racing	Chevrolet Corvette	(United States) Eric Curran	(United States) Boris Said	
44	Magnus Racing	Porsche 911 GT3 Cup	(United States) John Potter	(United States) Andy Lally	
46	Fall-Line Motorsports	Audi R8 Grand-Am	(United States) Mark Boden	(United States) Bryan Sellers	
57	Stevenson Motorsports	Chevrolet Camaro GT.R	(United States) John Edwards	(Scotland) Robin Liddell	
61	R.Ferri/AIM Motorsport Racing with Ferrari	Ferrari 458 Italia Grand-Am	(Canada) Alex Tagliani	(United States) Jeff Segal	
63	Scuderia Corsa	Ferrari 458 Italia Grand-Am	(Italy) Alessandro Balzan	(United States) Leh Keen	
69	AIM Autosport Team FXDD with Ferrari	Ferrari 458 Italia Grand-Am	(United States) Emil Assentato	(United States) Anthony Lazzaro	
73	Park Place Motorsports	Porsche 911 GT3 Cup	(United States) Patrick Lindsey	(United States) Patrick Long	
93	Turner Motorsports	BMW M3	(United States) Michael Marsal	(United States) Billy Johnson	
94	Turner Motorsports	BMW M3	(Canada) Paul Dalla Lana	(United States) Bill Auberlen	
GX
00	Visit Florida Racing/Speedsource	Mazda6 GX	(United States) Joel Miller	(United States) Tristan Nunez	
38	BGB Motorsports	Porsche Cayman GX.R	(United States) Jim Norman	(United States) Spencer Pumpelly	
70	Mazdaspeed/Speedsource	Mazda6 GX	(United States) Tom Long	(Canada) Sylvain Tremblay	

== Qualifying ==
=== Qualifying Results ===
Pole positions in each class are denoted in bold.

Pos	Class	No.	Team	Car	Qualifying	Grid
1	**DP**	**01**	**Chip Ganassi Racing with Felix Sabates**	**Riley / BMW**	**1:09.883**	**1**
2	DP	6	Michael Shank Racing	Riley / Ford	1:09.950	2
3	DP	5	Action Express Racing	Corvette DP	1:10.055	3
4	DP	9	Action Express Racing	Corvette DP	1:10.081	4
5	DP	10	Wayne Taylor Racing	Corvette DP	1:10.184	5
6	DP	90	Spirit of Daytona Racing	Corvette DP	1:10.461	6
7	DP	99	GAINSCO/Bob Stallings Racing	Corvette DP	1:10.481	7
8	DP	2	Starworks Motorsport	Riley / Ford	1:10.511	8
9	DP	42	Team Sahlen	Riley / BMW	1:10.957	9
10	DP	60	Michael Shank Racing	Riley / Ford	1:11.308	10
11	DP	3	8 Star Motorsports	Corvette DP	1:11.323	11
12	DP	4	8 Star Motorsports	Corvette DP	1:12.653	12
13	DP	8	Starworks Motorsport	Riley / BMW	1:12.939	13
14	DP	43	Team Sahlen	Riley / BMW	1:14.221	14
15	**GT**	**61**	**R. Ferri/AIM Motorsport Racing with Ferrari**	**Ferrari 458 Italia Grand-Am**	**1:14.956**	**15**
16	GT	63	Scuderia Corsa	Ferrari 458 Italia Grand-Am	1:15.216	16
17	GT	69	AIM Autosport Team FXDD with Ferrari	Ferrari 458 Italia Grand-Am	1:15.498	17
18	GT	57	Stevenson Motorsports	Chevrolet Camaro GT.R	1:15.528	18
19	GT	73	Park Place Motorsports	Porsche 911 GT3 Cup	1:15.776	19
20	GT	31	Marsh Racing	Chevrolet Corvette	1:15.982	20
21	GT	94	Turner Motorsport	BMW M3	1:16.118	21
22	GT	44	Magnus Racing	Porsche 911 GT3 Cup	1:16.498	22
23	GT	93	Turner Motorsport	BMW M3	1:16.636	23
24	GT	46	Fall-Line Motorsports	Audi R8 Grand-Am	1:18.549	24
25	**GX**	**70**	**Mazdaspeed/Speedsource**	**Mazda6 GX**	**1:21.338**	**25**
26	GX	00	Visit Florida Racing/Speedsource	Mazda6 GX	1:22.034	26
27	GX	38	BGB Motorsports	Porsche Cayman GX.R	No time	27

== Race ==
=== Race results ===
Winners in each class are denoted in bold.

Pos.	Class	No.	Team	Drivers	Chassis	Laps
Pos.	Class	No.	Team	Drivers	Engine	Laps
1	**DP**	**10**	**(United States) Wayne Taylor Racing**	**(Italy) Max Angelelli** **(United States) Jordan Taylor**	**Corvette DP (Dallara)**	**123**
1	**DP**	**10**	**(United States) Wayne Taylor Racing**	**(Italy) Max Angelelli** **(United States) Jordan Taylor**	**Chevrolet 5.0L V8**	**123**
2	DP	01	(United States) Chip Ganassi Racing with Felix Sabates	(United States) Scott Pruett (Mexico) Memo Rojas	Riley Mk. XXVI	123
2	DP	01	(United States) Chip Ganassi Racing with Felix Sabates	(United States) Scott Pruett (Mexico) Memo Rojas	BMW 5.0L V8	123
3	DP	60	(United States) Michael Shank Racing	(Brazil) Oswaldo Negri Jr. (United States) John Pew	Riley Mk. XXVI	123
3	DP	60	(United States) Michael Shank Racing	(Brazil) Oswaldo Negri Jr. (United States) John Pew	Ford 5.0L V8	123
4	DP	5	(United States) Action Express Racing	(Brazil) Christian Fittipaldi (Portugal) João Barbosa	Corvette DP (Coyote)	123
4	DP	5	(United States) Action Express Racing	(Brazil) Christian Fittipaldi (Portugal) João Barbosa	Chevrolet 5.0L V8	123
5	DP	9	(United States) Action Express Racing	(United States) Brian Frisselle (United States) Burt Frisselle	Corvette DP (Coyote)	123
5	DP	9	(United States) Action Express Racing	(United States) Brian Frisselle (United States) Burt Frisselle	Chevrolet 5.0L V8	123
6	DP	8	(United States) Starworks Motorsport	(New Zealand) Brendon Hartley (United States) Scott Mayer	Riley Mk. XXVI	123
6	DP	8	(United States) Starworks Motorsport	(New Zealand) Brendon Hartley (United States) Scott Mayer	Ford 5.0L V8	123
7	DP	42	(United States) Team Sahlen	(United States) Dane Cameron (United States) Wayne Nonnamaker	Riley Mk. XXVI	123
7	DP	42	(United States) Team Sahlen	(United States) Dane Cameron (United States) Wayne Nonnamaker	BMW 5.0L V8	123
8	DP	99	(United States) GAINSCO/Bob Stallings Racing	(United States) Jon Fogarty (United States) Alex Gurney	Corvette DP (Riley XXVI)	122
8	DP	99	(United States) GAINSCO/Bob Stallings Racing	(United States) Jon Fogarty (United States) Alex Gurney	Chevrolet 5.0L V8	122
9	DP	3	(United States) 8 Star Motorsports	(Venezuela) Enzo Potolicchio (Canada) Michael Valiante (France) Stéphane Sarrazin	Corvette DP (Coyote)	122
9	DP	3	(United States) 8 Star Motorsports	(Venezuela) Enzo Potolicchio (Canada) Michael Valiante (France) Stéphane Sarrazin	Chevrolet 5.0L V8	122
10	DP	43	(United States) Team Sahlen	(United States) Joe Nonnamaker (United States) Will Nonnamaker	Riley Mk. XXVI	121
10	DP	43	(United States) Team Sahlen	(United States) Joe Nonnamaker (United States) Will Nonnamaker	BMW 5.0L V8	121
11	**GT**	**63**	**(United States) Scuderia Corsa**	**(Italy) Alessandro Balzan** **(United States) Leh Keen**	**Ferrari 458 Italia Grand-Am**	**118**
11	**GT**	**63**	**(United States) Scuderia Corsa**	**(Italy) Alessandro Balzan** **(United States) Leh Keen**	**Ferrari 4.5L V8**	**118**
12	GT	73	(United States) Park Place Motorsports	(United States) Patrick Lindsey (United States) Patrick Long	Porsche 911 GT3 Cup	117
12	GT	73	(United States) Park Place Motorsports	(United States) Patrick Lindsey (United States) Patrick Long	Porsche 4.0L F6	117
13	GT	69	(United States) AIM Autosport Team FXDD with Ferrari	(United States) Emil Assentato (United States) Anthony Lazzaro	Ferrari 458 Italia Grand-Am	117
13	GT	69	(United States) AIM Autosport Team FXDD with Ferrari	(United States) Emil Assentato (United States) Anthony Lazzaro	Ferrari 4.5L V8	117
14	GT	57	(United States) Stevenson Motorsports	(United States) John Edwards (Scotland) Robin Liddell	Chevrolet Camaro GT.R	117
14	GT	57	(United States) Stevenson Motorsports	(United States) John Edwards (Scotland) Robin Liddell	Chevrolet 6.2L V8	117
15	GT	46	(United States) Fall-Line Motorsports	(United States) Mark Boden (United States) Bryan Sellers	Audi R8 Grand-Am	117
15	GT	46	(United States) Fall-Line Motorsports	(United States) Mark Boden (United States) Bryan Sellers	Audi 5.2L V10	117
16	GT	61	(United States) R. Ferri/AIM Motorsport Racing with Ferrari	(Canada) Alex Tagliani (United States) Jeff Segal	Ferrari 458 Italia Grand-Am	116
16	GT	61	(United States) R. Ferri/AIM Motorsport Racing with Ferrari	(Canada) Alex Tagliani (United States) Jeff Segal	Ferrari 4.5L V8	116
17	GT	94	(United States) Turner Motorsport	(Canada) Paul Dalla Lana (United States) Bill Auberlen	BMW M3	115
17	GT	94	(United States) Turner Motorsport	(Canada) Paul Dalla Lana (United States) Bill Auberlen	BMW 5.0L V8	115
18	GT	44	(United States) Magnus Racing	(United States) Andy Lally (United States) John Potter	Porsche 911 GT3 Cup	112
18	GT	44	(United States) Magnus Racing	(United States) Andy Lally (United States) John Potter	Porsche 4.0L F6	112
19	GT	93	(United States) Turner Motorsport	(United States) Billy Johnson (United States) Michael Marsal	BMW M3	111
19	GT	93	(United States) Turner Motorsport	(United States) Billy Johnson (United States) Michael Marsal	BMW 5.0L V8	111
20	**GX**	**00**	**(United States) Visit Florida Racing/Speedsource**	**(United States) Joel Miller** **(United States) Tristan Nunez**	**Mazda6 GX**	**109**
20	**GX**	**00**	**(United States) Visit Florida Racing/Speedsource**	**(United States) Joel Miller** **(United States) Tristan Nunez**	**Mazda 2.2L I4 Diesel**	**109**
21	GX	38	(United States) BGB Motorsports	(United States) Jim Norman (United States) Spencer Pumpelly	Porsche Cayman GX.R	103
21	GX	38	(United States) BGB Motorsports	(United States) Jim Norman (United States) Spencer Pumpelly	Porsche 3.8L F6	103
22	DP	2	(United States) Starworks Motorsport	(Scotland) Ryan Dalziel (Venezuela) Alex Popow	Riley Mk. XXVI	102
22	DP	2	(United States) Starworks Motorsport	(Scotland) Ryan Dalziel (Venezuela) Alex Popow	BMW 5.0L V8	102
23	DP	90	(United States) Spirit of Daytona Racing	(United States) Ricky Taylor (United Kingdom) Richard Westbrook	Corvette DP (Coyote)	100
23	DP	90	(United States) Spirit of Daytona Racing	(United States) Ricky Taylor (United Kingdom) Richard Westbrook	Chevrolet 5.0L V8	100
24 DNF	DP	4	(United States) 8 Star Motorsports	(France) Sébastien Bourdais (Venezuela) Emilio DiGuida	Corvette DP (Coyote)	92
24 DNF	DP	4	(United States) 8 Star Motorsports	(France) Sébastien Bourdais (Venezuela) Emilio DiGuida	Chevrolet 5.0L V8	92
25 DNF	DP	6	(United States) Michael Shank Racing	(United Kingdom) Justin Wilson (Colombia) Gustavo Yacamán	Riley Mk. XXVI	91
25 DNF	DP	6	(United States) Michael Shank Racing	(United Kingdom) Justin Wilson (Colombia) Gustavo Yacamán	Ford 5.0L V8	91
26 DNF	GX	70	(United States) Mazdaspeed/Speedsource	(United States) Tom Long (Canada) Sylvain Tremblay	Mazda6 GX	45
26 DNF	GX	70	(United States) Mazdaspeed/Speedsource	(United States) Tom Long (Canada) Sylvain Tremblay	Mazda 2.2L I4 Diesel	45
27 DNF	GT	31	(United States) Marsh Racing	(United States) Eric Curran (United States) Boris Said	Chevrolet Corvette	24
27 DNF	GT	31	(United States) Marsh Racing	(United States) Eric Curran (United States) Boris Said	Chevrolet 6.2L V8	24

Preceded by 2013 VisitFlorida.com Sports Car 250	Rolex Sports Car Series; 2013	Succeeded by 2013 Continental Tire Sports Car Festival
