= 2013 VisitFlorida.com Sports Car 250 =

Track map of Road America

The 2013 VisitFlorida.com Sports Car 250 was the ninth race of 2013 Rolex Sports Car Series season. It took place at Road America on August 10, 2013.

== Entry list ==
Entry List
No.	Team	Car	Driver 1	Driver 2	Driver 3
DP
01	Chip Ganassi Racing with Felix Sabates	Riley-BMW	(United States) Scott Pruett	(Mexico) Memo Rojas	
2	Starworks Motorsport	Riley-BMW	(United Kingdom) Ryan Dalziel	(Venezuela) Alex Popow	
3	8Star Motorsports	Corvette DP	(Venezuela) Enzo Potolicchio	(Canada) Michael Valiante	(France) Stéphane Sarrazin
4	8Star Motorsports	Corvette DP	(Venezuela) Emilio DiGuida	(France) Sébastien Bourdais	
5	Action Express Racing	Corvette DP	(Brazil) Christian Fittipaldi	(Portugal) João Barbosa	
6	Michael Shank Racing	Riley-Ford	(Colombia) Gustavo Yacamán	(United Kingdom) Justin Wilson	
8	Starworks Motorsport	Riley-BMW	(United States) Scott Mayer	(New Zealand) Brendon Hartley	(Germany) Pierre Kaffer
9	Action Express Racing	Corvette DP	(United States) Brian Frisselle	(United States) Burt Frisselle	
10	Wayne Taylor Racing	Corvette DP	(Italy) Max Angelelli	(United States) Jordan Taylor	
42	Team Sahlen	Riley-BMW	(United States) Dane Cameron	(United States) Wayne Nonnamaker	
43	Team Sahlen	Riley-BMW	(United States) Joe Nonnamaker	(United States) Will Nonnamaker	
60	Michael Shank Racing	Riley-Ford	(Brazil) Oswaldo Negri Jr.	(United States) John Pew	
90	Spirit of Daytona Racing	Corvette DP	(United States) Ricky Taylor	(United Kingdom) Richard Westbrook	
99	GAINSCO/Bob Stallings Racing	Corvette DP	(United States) Jon Fogarty	(United States) Alex Gurney	
GT
18	Mühlner Motorsports America	Porsche 911 GT3 Cup	(Germany) Tim Bergmeister	(Netherlands) Jeroen Bleekemolen	
19	Mühlner Motorsports America	Porsche 911 GT3 Cup	(United States) Bob Doyle	(United States) Grant Maiman	
31	Marsh Racing	Chevrolet Corvette	(United States) Eric Curran	(United States) Boris Said	
44	Magnus Racing	Porsche 911 GT3 Cup	(United States) John Potter	(United States) Andy Lally	
46	Fall-Line Motorsports	Audi R8 Grand-Am	(United States) Charles Espenlaub	(United States) Charles Putnam	
57	Stevenson Motorsports	Chevrolet Camaro GT.R	(United States) John Edwards	(Scotland) Robin Liddell	
61	R.Ferri/AIM Motorsport Racing with Ferrari	Ferrari 458 Italia Grand-Am	(Italy) Max Papis	(United States) Jeff Segal	
63	Scuderia Corsa	Ferrari 458 Italia Grand-Am	(Italy) Alessandro Balzan	(United States) Leh Keen	
64	Scuderia Corsa	Ferrari 458 Italia Grand-Am	(United States) Christopher Ruud	(United States) Craig Stanton	
69	AIM Autosport Team FXDD with Ferrari	Ferrari 458 Italia Grand-Am	(United States) Emil Assentato	(United States) Anthony Lazzaro	
73	Park Place Motorsports	Porsche 911 GT3 Cup	(United States) Patrick Lindsey	(United States) Patrick Long	
93	Turner Motorsports	BMW M3	(United States) Michael Marsal	(Belgium) Maxime Martin	
94	Turner Motorsports	BMW M3	(Canada) Paul Dalla Lana	(United States) Bill Auberlen	(United States) Billy Johnson
GX
00	Visit Florida Racing/Speedsource	Mazda6 GX	(United States) Joel Miller	(United States) Tristan Nunez	
38	BGB Motorsports	Porsche Cayman GX.R	(United States) Jim Norman	(United States) Spencer Pumpelly	
70	Mazdaspeed/Speedsource	Mazda6 GX	(United States) Tom Long	(Canada) Sylvain Tremblay	

== Qualifying ==
=== Qualifying Results ===
Pole positions in each class are denoted in bold.

Pos	Class	No.	Team	Car	Qualifying	Grid
1	**DP**	**42**	**Team Sahlen**	**Riley / BMW**	**2.00.028**	**1**
2	DP	10	Wayne Taylor Racing	Corvette DP	2.00.575	2
3	DP	01	Chip Ganassi Racing with Felix Sabates	Riley / BMW	2.00.710	3
4	DP	4	8 Star Motorsports	Corvette DP	2.00.914	14
5	DP	5	Action Express Racing	Corvette DP	2.01.096	4
6	DP	99	GAINSCO/Bob Stallings Racing	Corvette DP	2.01.245	5
7	DP	2	Starworks Motorsport	Riley / Ford	2.01.293	6
8	DP	6	Michael Shank Racing	Riley / Ford	2.01.658	7
9	DP	90	Spirit of Daytona Racing	Corvette DP	2.01.671	8
10	DP	9	Action Express Racing	Corvette DP	2.01.934	9
11	DP	3	8 Star Motorsports	Corvette DP	2.03.208	10
12	DP	60	Michael Shank Racing	Riley / Ford	2.03.262	11
13	DP	8	Starworks Motorsport	Riley / BMW	2.07.973	12
14	**GT**	**63**	**Scuderia Corsa**	**Ferrari 458 Italia Grand-Am**	**2.11.183**	**15**
15	GT	94	Turner Motorsport	BMW M3	2.11.234	16
16	GT	73	Park Place Motorsports	Porsche 911 GT3 Cup	2.11.415	17
17	GT	57	Stevenson Motorsports	Chevrolet Camaro GT.R	2.12.535	26
18	GT	44	Magnus Racing	Porsche 911 GT3 Cup	2.12.541	18
19	GT	61	R. Ferri/AIM Motorsport Racing with Ferrari	Ferrari 458 Italia Grand-Am	2.12.647	19
20	GT	18	Mühlner Motorsports America	Porsche 911 GT3 Cup	2.12.735	20
21	DP	43	Team Sahlen	Riley / BMW	2.12.999	13
22	GT	93	Turner Motorsport	BMW M3	2.13.506	21
23	GT	69	AIM Autosport Team FXDD with Ferrari	Ferrari 458 Italia Grand-Am	2.13.630	22
24	**GX**	**70**	**Mazdaspeed/Speedsource**	**Mazda6 GX**	**2.19.310**	**28**
25	GX	00	Visit Florida Racing/Speedsource	Mazda6 GX	2:26.117	29
26	GX	38	BGB Motorsports	Porsche Cayman GX.R	2:31.662	30
27	GT	31	Marsh Racing	Chevrolet Corvette	No time	23
28	GT	19	Mühlner Motorsports America	Porsche 911 GT3 Cup	No time	27
29	GT	46	Fall-Line Motorsports	Audi R8 Grand-Am	No time	24
30	GT	64	Scuderia Corsa	Ferrari 458 Italia Grand-Am	No time	25

== Race ==
=== Race results ===
Winners in each class are denoted in bold.

Pos.	Class	No.	Team	Drivers	Chassis	Laps
Pos.	Class	No.	Team	Drivers	Engine	Laps
1	**DP**	**8**	**(United States) Starworks Motorsport**	**(New Zealand) Brendon Hartley** **(United States) Scott Mayer** **(Germany) Pierre Kaffer**	**Riley Mk. XXVI**	**70**
1	**DP**	**8**	**(United States) Starworks Motorsport**	**(New Zealand) Brendon Hartley** **(United States) Scott Mayer** **(Germany) Pierre Kaffer**	**Ford 5.0L V8**	**70**
2	DP	5	(United States) Action Express Racing	(Brazil) Christian Fittipaldi (Portugal) João Barbosa	Corvette DP (Coyote)	70
2	DP	5	(United States) Action Express Racing	(Brazil) Christian Fittipaldi (Portugal) João Barbosa	Chevrolet 5.0L V8	70
3	DP	9	(United States) Action Express Racing	(United States) Brian Frisselle (United States) Burt Frisselle	Corvette DP (Coyote)	70
3	DP	9	(United States) Action Express Racing	(United States) Brian Frisselle (United States) Burt Frisselle	Chevrolet 5.0L V8	70
4	DP	01	(United States) Chip Ganassi Racing with Felix Sabates	(United States) Scott Pruett (Mexico) Memo Rojas	Riley Mk. XXVI	70
4	DP	01	(United States) Chip Ganassi Racing with Felix Sabates	(United States) Scott Pruett (Mexico) Memo Rojas	BMW 5.0L V8	70
5	DP	60	(United States) Michael Shank Racing	(Brazil) Oswaldo Negri Jr. (United States) John Pew	Riley Mk. XXVI	70
5	DP	60	(United States) Michael Shank Racing	(Brazil) Oswaldo Negri Jr. (United States) John Pew	Ford 5.0L V8	70
6	DP	6	(United States) Michael Shank Racing	(United Kingdom) Justin Wilson (Colombia) Gustavo Yacamán	Riley Mk. XXVI	70
6	DP	6	(United States) Michael Shank Racing	(United Kingdom) Justin Wilson (Colombia) Gustavo Yacamán	Ford 5.0L V8	70
7	DP	10	(United States) Wayne Taylor Racing	(Italy) Max Angelelli (United States) Jordan Taylor	Corvette DP (Dallara)	70
7	DP	10	(United States) Wayne Taylor Racing	(Italy) Max Angelelli (United States) Jordan Taylor	Chevrolet 5.0L V8	70
8	DP	99	(United States) GAINSCO/Bob Stallings Racing	(United States) Jon Fogarty (United States) Alex Gurney	Corvette DP (Riley XXVI)	70
8	DP	99	(United States) GAINSCO/Bob Stallings Racing	(United States) Jon Fogarty (United States) Alex Gurney	Chevrolet 5.0L V8	70
9	DP	4	(United States) 8 Star Motorsports	(France) Sébastien Bourdais (Venezuela) Emilio DiGuida	Corvette DP (Coyote)	70
9	DP	4	(United States) 8 Star Motorsports	(France) Sébastien Bourdais (Venezuela) Emilio DiGuida	Chevrolet 5.0L V8	70
10	**GT**	**94**	**(United States) Turner Motorsport**	**(Canada) Paul Dalla Lana** **(United States) Bill Auberlen** **(United States) Billy Johnson**	**BMW M3**	**68**
10	**GT**	**94**	**(United States) Turner Motorsport**	**(Canada) Paul Dalla Lana** **(United States) Bill Auberlen** **(United States) Billy Johnson**	**BMW 5.0L V8**	**68**
11	GT	73	(United States) Park Place Motorsports	(United States) Patrick Lindsey (United States) Patrick Long	Porsche 911 GT3 Cup	68
11	GT	73	(United States) Park Place Motorsports	(United States) Patrick Lindsey (United States) Patrick Long	Porsche 4.0L F6	68
12	GT	93	(United States) Turner Motorsport	(Belgium) Maxime Martin (United States) Michael Marsal	BMW M3	68
12	GT	93	(United States) Turner Motorsport	(Belgium) Maxime Martin (United States) Michael Marsal	BMW 5.0L V8	68
13	GT	61	(United States) R. Ferri/AIM Motorsport Racing with Ferrari	(Canada) Kenny Wilden (United States) Jeff Segal	Ferrari 458 Italia Grand-Am	68
13	GT	61	(United States) R. Ferri/AIM Motorsport Racing with Ferrari	(Canada) Kenny Wilden (United States) Jeff Segal	Ferrari 4.5L V8	68
14	GT	44	(United States) Magnus Racing	(United States) Andy Lally (United States) John Potter	Porsche 911 GT3 Cup	68
14	GT	44	(United States) Magnus Racing	(United States) Andy Lally (United States) John Potter	Porsche 4.0L F6	68
15	GT	63	(United States) Scuderia Corsa	(Italy) Alessandro Balzan (United States) Leh Keen	Ferrari 458 Italia Grand-Am	68
15	GT	63	(United States) Scuderia Corsa	(Italy) Alessandro Balzan (United States) Leh Keen	Ferrari 4.5L V8	68
16	GT	69	(United States) AIM Autosport Team FXDD with Ferrari	(United States) Emil Assentato (United States) Anthony Lazzaro	Ferrari 458 Italia Grand-Am	68
16	GT	69	(United States) AIM Autosport Team FXDD with Ferrari	(United States) Emil Assentato (United States) Anthony Lazzaro	Ferrari 4.5L V8	68
17	GT	57	(United States) Stevenson Motorsports	(United States) John Edwards (Scotland) Robin Liddell	Chevrolet Camaro GT.R	67
17	GT	57	(United States) Stevenson Motorsports	(United States) John Edwards (Scotland) Robin Liddell	Chevrolet 6.2L V8	67
18	**GX**	**00**	**(United States) Visit Florida Racing/Speedsource**	**(United States) Joel Miller** **(United States) Tristan Nunez**	**Mazda6 GX**	**63**
18	**GX**	**00**	**(United States) Visit Florida Racing/Speedsource**	**(United States) Joel Miller** **(United States) Tristan Nunez**	**Mazda 2.2L I4 Diesel**	**63**
19	GX	38	(United States) BGB Motorsports	(United States) Jim Norman (United States) Spencer Pumpelly	Porsche Cayman GX.R	63
19	GX	38	(United States) BGB Motorsports	(United States) Jim Norman (United States) Spencer Pumpelly	Porsche 3.8L F6	63
20	GT	18	(Belgium) Mühlner Motorsports America	(Germany) Tim Bergmeister (Netherlands) Jeroen Bleekemolen	Porsche 911 GT3 Cup	63
20	GT	18	(Belgium) Mühlner Motorsports America	(Germany) Tim Bergmeister (Netherlands) Jeroen Bleekemolen	Porsche 4.0L F6	63
21 DNF	GX	70	(United States) Mazdaspeed/Speedsource	(United States) Tom Long (Canada) Sylvain Tremblay	Mazda6 GX	55
21 DNF	GX	70	(United States) Mazdaspeed/Speedsource	(United States) Tom Long (Canada) Sylvain Tremblay	Mazda 2.2L I4 Diesel	55
22 DNF	DP	42	(United States) Team Sahlen	(United States) Dane Cameron (United States) Wayne Nonnamaker	Riley Mk. XXVI	54
22 DNF	DP	42	(United States) Team Sahlen	(United States) Dane Cameron (United States) Wayne Nonnamaker	BMW 5.0L V8	54
23 DNF	DP	43	(United States) Team Sahlen	(United States) Joe Nonnamaker (United States) Will Nonnamaker	Riley Mk. XXVI	54
23 DNF	DP	43	(United States) Team Sahlen	(United States) Joe Nonnamaker (United States) Will Nonnamaker	BMW 5.0L V8	54
24 DNF	DP	3	(United States) 8 Star Motorsports	(Venezuela) Enzo Potolicchio (Canada) Michael Valiante (France) Stéphane Sarrazin	Corvette DP (Coyote)	53
24 DNF	DP	3	(United States) 8 Star Motorsports	(Venezuela) Enzo Potolicchio (Canada) Michael Valiante (France) Stéphane Sarrazin	Chevrolet 5.0L V8	53
25	GT	19	(Belgium) Mühlner Motorsports America	(United States) Bob Doyle (United States) Grant Maiman	Porsche 911 GT3 Cup	50
25	GT	19	(Belgium) Mühlner Motorsports America	(United States) Bob Doyle (United States) Grant Maiman	Porsche 4.0L F6	50
26	GT	64	(United States) Scuderia Corsa	(United States) Christopher Ruud (United States) Craig Stanton	Ferrari 458 Italia Grand-Am	49
26	GT	64	(United States) Scuderia Corsa	(United States) Christopher Ruud (United States) Craig Stanton	Ferrari 4.5L V8	49
27	DP	90	(United States) Spirit of Daytona Racing	(United States) Ricky Taylor (United Kingdom) Richard Westbrook	Corvette DP (Coyote)	47
27	DP	90	(United States) Spirit of Daytona Racing	(United States) Ricky Taylor (United Kingdom) Richard Westbrook	Chevrolet 5.0L V8	47
28 DNF	DP	2	(United States) Starworks Motorsport	(Scotland) Ryan Dalziel (Venezuela) Alex Popow	Riley Mk. XXVI	38
28 DNF	DP	2	(United States) Starworks Motorsport	(Scotland) Ryan Dalziel (Venezuela) Alex Popow	BMW 5.0L V8	38
29 DNF	GT	31	(United States) Marsh Racing	(United States) Eric Curran (United States) Boris Said	Chevrolet Corvette	21
29 DNF	GT	31	(United States) Marsh Racing	(United States) Eric Curran (United States) Boris Said	Chevrolet 6.2L V8	21
30 DNS	GT	46	(United States) Fall-Line Motorsports	(United States) Charles Putnam (United States) Charles Espenlaub	Audi R8 Grand-Am	0
30 DNS	GT	46	(United States) Fall-Line Motorsports	(United States) Charles Putnam (United States) Charles Espenlaub	Audi 5.2L V10	0

Preceded by 2013 Brickyard Grand Prix	Rolex Sports Car Series; 2013	Succeeded by 2013 SFP Grand Prix
