= Brendon Hartley =

New Zealand racing driver (born 1989)

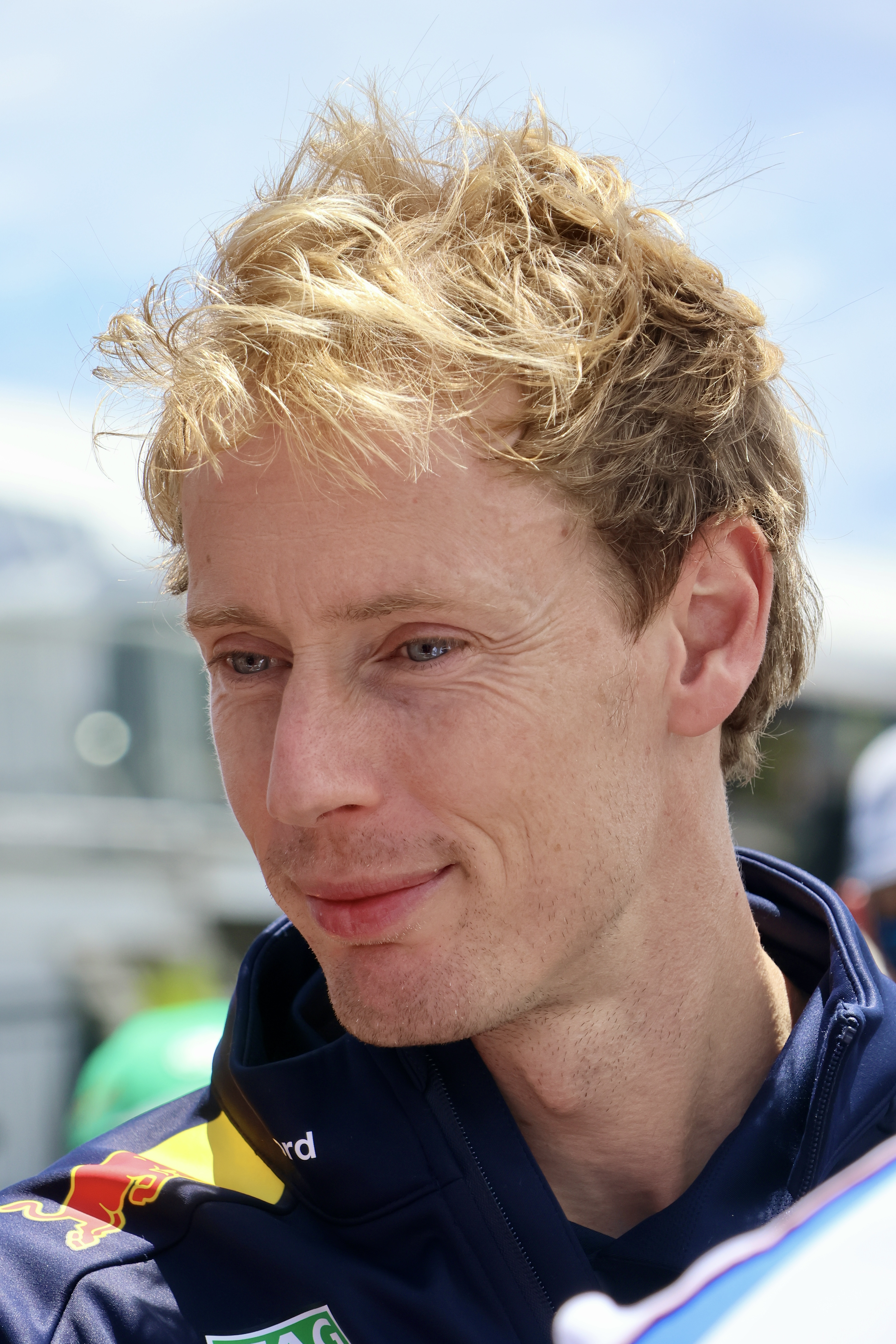
- Hartley at the 2025 Adelaide Grand Final
- Born: Brendon Morris Hartley; 10 November 1989 (age 37); Palmerston North, Manawatū-Whanganui, New Zealand
- Spouse: Sarah Wilson (m. 2018)

FIA World Endurance Championship career
- Debut season: 2012
- Current team: Toyota Gazoo Racing
- Categorisation: FIA Platinum
- Car number: 8
- Former teams: Murphy, Porsche, SMP
- Starts: 90
- Championships: 5 (2015, 2017, 2022, 2023, 2026)
- Wins: 26
- Podiums: 56
- Poles: 17
- Fastest laps: 8
- Best finish: 1st in 2015, 2017 (LMP1), 2022, 2023, 2026 (LMH)

Formula One World Championship career
- Nationality: (New Zealand) New Zealander
- Active years: 2017–2018
- Team: Toro Rosso
- Car number: 28 (Note: Hartley selected the number 28 as his personal driver number, per FIA regulations; at the 2017 United States Grand Prix, he competed using the standard reserve number 39 for Toro Rosso.)
- Entries: 25
- Championships: 0
- Wins: 0
- Podiums: 0
- Career points: 4
- Pole positions: 0
- Fastest laps: 0
- First entry: 2017 United States Grand Prix
- Last entry: 2018 Abu Dhabi Grand Prix

24 Hours of Le Mans career
- Years: 2012–2017, 2020–2024
- Teams: Murphy, Porsche, Toyota
- Best finish: 1st (2017, 2020, 2022)
- Class wins: 3 (2017, 2020, 2022)

Previous series
- 2009–2011; 2008–2009; 2008; 2007; 2006–2007; 2006; 2005–2006; 2003–04; 2002–03: Formula Renault 3.5; F3 Euro Series; British F3; Formula Renault 2.0 Italia; Eurocup Formula Renault 2.0; Formula Renault 2.0 NEC; Toyota Racing Series; Formula Ford NZ; Formula First NZ

Championship titles
- 2007: Eurocup Formula Renault 2.0

Brendon Morris Hartley (born 10 November 1989) is a New Zealand racing driver, who competes in the FIA World Endurance Championship for Toyota. Hartley competed in Formula One from 2017 to 2018. In endurance racing, Hartley has won a joint-record five FIA World Endurance Championship titles—tied with Sébastien Buemi—and is a three-time winner of the 24 Hours of Le Mans.

Hartley won the 2015 FIA World Endurance Championship, alongside his teammates Mark Webber and Timo Bernhard, and also went on to win the 2017 FIA World Endurance Championship alongside Bernhard and Earl Bamber. He won the 2017 24 Hours of Le Mans with Bamber and Bernhard, the 2020 24 Hours of Le Mans with Sébastien Buemi and Kazuki Nakajima, and the 2022 24 Hours of Le Mans with Buemi and Ryō Hirakawa.

Hartley formerly competed in Formula One for Scuderia Toro Rosso, making his debut at the 2017 United States Grand Prix.

== Early career ==
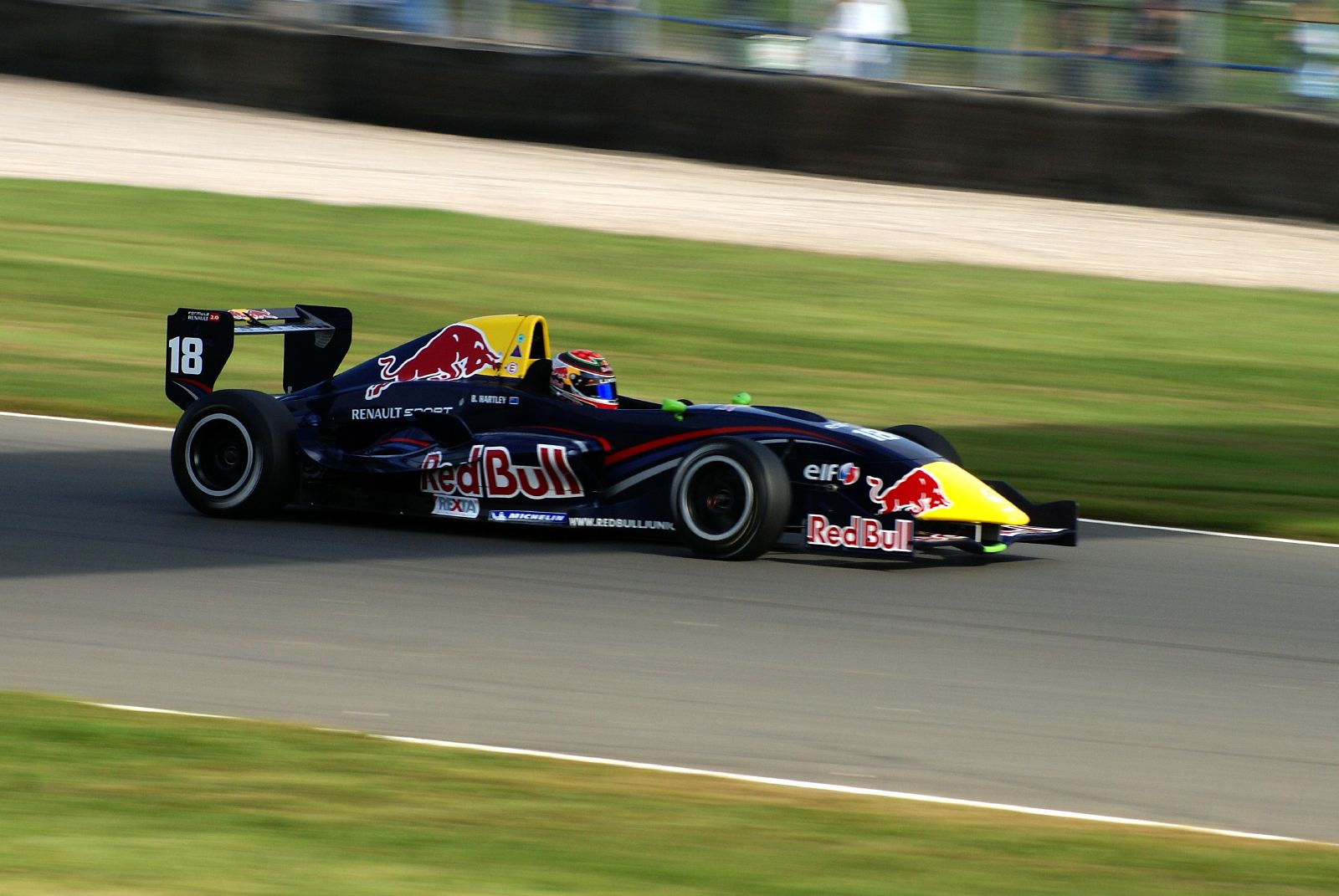
Hartley won the Eurocup Formula Renault 2.0 championship in 2007.

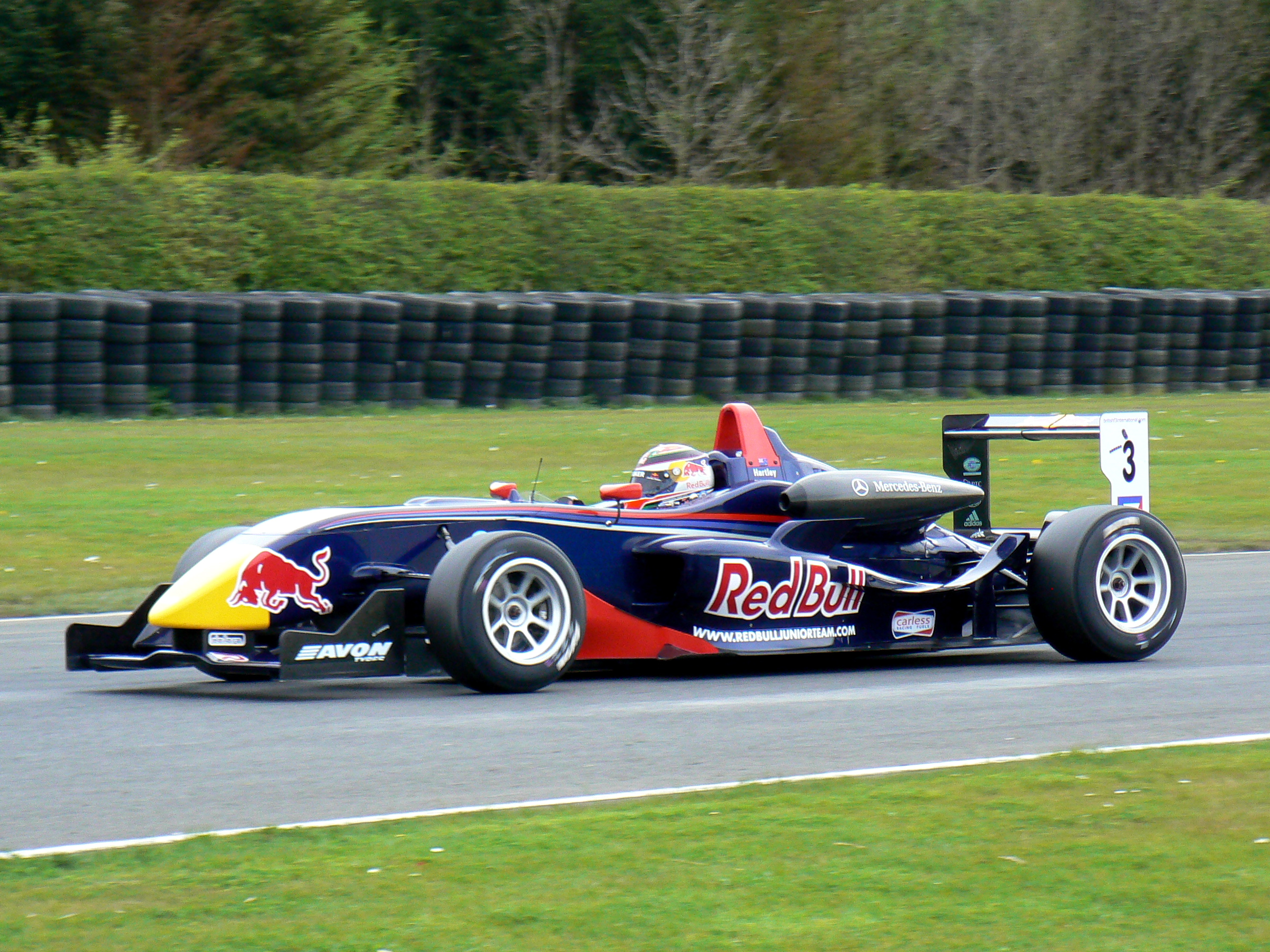
Hartley driving for Carlin Motorsport at the Croft round of the 2008 British Formula 3 season

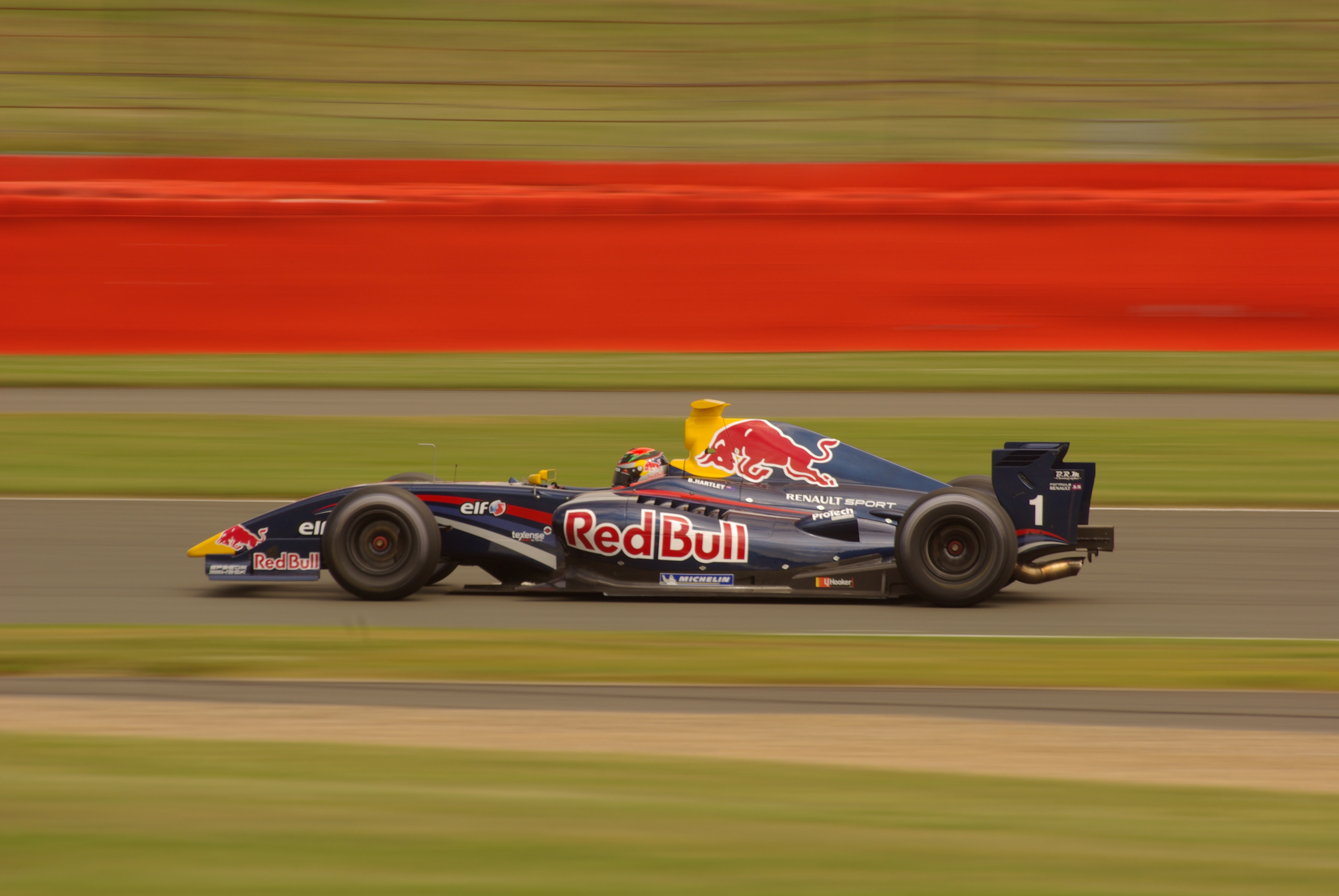
Hartley driving for Tech 1 Racing at the Silverstone round of the 2009 Formula Renault 3.5 Series

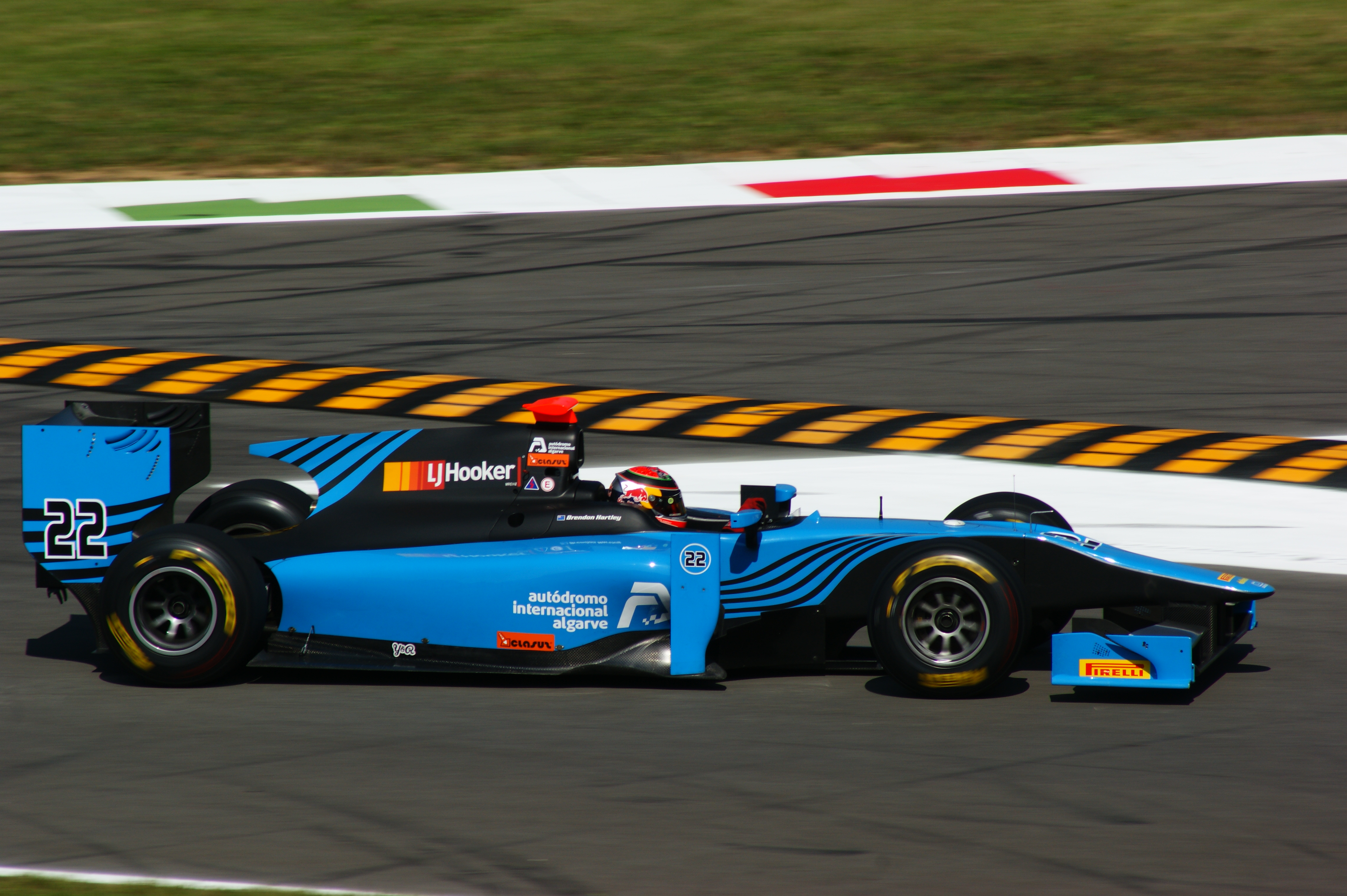
Hartley driving for Ocean Racing Technology at the Monza round of the 2011 GP2 Series

Brendon Morris Hartley was born on 10 November 1989 in Palmerston North in a family well integrated within motorsport. His father, Brian, had raced in many forms of motorsport, including Formula Atlantic. At the age of six, Hartley began his motor racing career in kart racing, following in his brother Nelson's footsteps. Six years later, he competed in his first full-scale race championship, competing in the Formula First category. Hartley finished the season in seventh. In 2003, he won that year's New Zealand Formula Ford Festival, which resulted in him getting a drive for the following year's Formula Ford championship. In a car his brother had used the previous year, he started four races and won two of them.

After a season in Formula Toyota New Zealand, Hartley moved to Europe, competing in the Eurocup Formula Renault 2.0 and Formula Renault 2.0 Northern European Cup (NEC). He finished 14th and tenth in the Drivers' Championship in the Eurocup and North European Cup respectively, taking a podium position at Anderstorp in the latter. In his second year in Formula Renault, he stayed in the Eurocup, but moved from the NEC to the Italian championship. He took three wins in the Eurocup and three podiums in the Italian championship, and took the championship title in the Eurocup.

In 2007, Hartley also made his Formula Three debut in the Masters of Formula 3 at Zolder event, finishing fourth. This resulted in a test with A1 Team New Zealand and the role of the rookie driver for the series. In 2008, he competed in the British Formula 3 Championship for Carlin Motorsport, winning five times, and eventually finished the championship in third. He also competed in eight races in the Formula Three Euroseries for Carlin and RC Motorsport, and achieved two finishes in the points, although he was ineligible for points. In non-championship races, Hartley finished fifth at the Masters of Formula 3, and third at the Macau Grand Prix. After crashing in the qualification race, he started 20th on the grid and recorded the fastest race lap.

Hartley stayed with Carlin for the full F3 Euroseries in 2009, finishing eleventh despite missing two rounds due to Formula Renault 3.5 Series commitments. In that series, Hartley competed for the defending champion Tech 1 Racing team, and ended fifteenth in the championship.

Hartley was signed at Tech 1 for a full season of Formula Renault 3.5 in 2010, where he was partnered by Australian and fellow Red Bull Junior driver, Daniel Ricciardo. During the series' summer break it was announced that Hartley had been dropped from the Red Bull Junior Team. His seat was taken by British Formula 3 championship leader Jean-Éric Vergne.

Despite the loss of his Red Bull backing, Hartley made his GP2 Series début at Monza in September, replacing Vladimir Arabadzhiev at the Coloni team. He scored a point in the season finale at Yas Marina to place 27th in the championship.

For 2011, Hartley returned to Formula Renault 3.5, driving alongside Jan Charouz for the Gravity–Charouz Racing team. With three podiums, Hartley placed seventh in the championship. He also returned to GP2 for the eighth round of the series at Spa-Francorchamps, replacing Kevin Mirocha and driving alongside Johnny Cecotto Jr. in the Ocean Racing Technology team, for whom he had tested before the start of the season. He finished in fifth place in his first race with the team.

Hartley began the 2012 season without a drive, but returned to Ocean for the second round of the championship in Bahrain in place of Jon Lancaster. After the two rounds in Bahrain, he was in turn replaced by Víctor Guerin. He finished 25th in the championship.

== First sportscar racing stint (2012–2017) ==
=== Beginnings in LMP2 ===
With no suitable single-seater drives available, Hartley joined the Murphy Prototypes sportscar team, which was competing in the LMP2 class in the European Le Mans Series. Following the cancellation of the second round of the ELMS championship (which would have been Hartley's début event) and the series' future in doubt, Murphy was one of several ELMS teams invited to compete as a guest entry in the 6 Hours of Spa-Francorchamps, a round of the FIA World Endurance Championship. Driving the team's Oreca 03-Nissan, Hartley finished third in the LMP2 class with teammates Warren Hughes and Jody Firth. The trio teamed up again for the 24 Hours of Le Mans, but retired from the race.

Hartley remained with Murphy for the 2013 ELMS season, whilst also signing on for a campaign at Starworks Motorsport in the US-based Rolex Sports Car Series. Hartley achieved pole position for the 3 Hours of Hungaroring. Though his teammate Jonathan Hirschi fell back during the race's opening half, Hartley made up almost two laps in drying conditions to finish second. Hartley and Hirschi then won the season finale at Le Castellet; Hartley ended up fifth in the standings. He also scored a victory in the RSCS, winning at Road America alongside Scott Mayer. It could have been two victories, had Hartley not collided with a GT car while leading at Austin.

=== Porsche success ===
Ahead of the 2014 season, Porsche announced Hartley as a factory driver, a duty he would fulfill by driving a Porsche 919 Hybrid in the WEC. His first season with the team proved to be challenging, as the No. 20 Porsche crew finished ninth in the standings with three podiums, while the sister car finished third. In 2015, Hartley's fortunes improved: he and teammates Mark Webber and Timo Bernhard finished third at Spa (despite Hartley receiving a penalty) and second at the 24 Hours of Le Mans. They then won the next four races in succession, starting with the 6 Hours of Nürburgring. Issues for the sister car of Romain Dumas allowed Hartley and co. to win at Austin, before team orders were used to give the championship-contending crew the win at Fuji. With a win in Shanghai, Hartley and his teammates earned Porsche the manufacturers' title. Despite suffering technical problems at the season-ending 6 Hours of Bahrain, the crew finished fifth and clinched the drivers' title.

Hartley, Bernhard, and Webber returned to defend their title in 2016. Having initially lead the opening race at Silverstone, Hartley collided with the GT car of Michael Wainwright and retired. He led at Spa during the opening hour, before multiple punctures forced the car out of contention. More issues followed at Le Mans, where water pump and engine heating issues caused Hartley and his teammates to lose two and a half hours in the night. The title-winning crew returned to form at the Nürburgring; in spite of a slow puncture, strong pace from Hartley during his second stint as well as a collision penalty for the sister car earned Hartley and his teammates the victory. In Mexico, the crew overcame changing weather conditions and a penalty for crossing the white line on pit exit to claim their second win of the season. At the next round in Austin, Hartley cut a 40-second deficit to the leading No. 7 Audi down to five seconds after sunset, before a clean run to the flag allowed the reigning champions to win again. After finishing third in Fuji, Hartley led the crew to victory at Shanghai, thereby helping clinch the manufacturers' title for Porsche. With a third place at Bahrain, Hartley and his teammates ended up fourth in the drivers' standings. At year's end, Hartley was named second in a list of the ten best sports car racing drivers of 2016 by online magazine Sportscar365.

Following Webber's retirement from professional competition, Hartley entered the 2017 season alongside Bernhard and countryman Earl Bamber. Despite running the Le Mans downforce kit at the first round at Silverstone, Hartley led until the final stint, when he was relegated to second by a fresh-tyred Sébastien Buemi. Hartley and his teammates then took third at Spa, him having suffered car damage in a collision with the LMP2 car of Romain Dumas. At Le Mans, Hartley's No. 2 crew experienced a tumultuous race: having lost 18 laps in the garage due to a failed front-axle hybrid harvesting motor, the team looked to be out of contention for the victory. Following failures for the other LMP1 entries however, including a late retirement for the sister car, Hartley and his teammates were able to pass the lower-class traffic to win Le Mans overall. More success followed at the Nürburgring, where Hartley passed José María López to take the lead during the second hour; the No. 2 went on to win and extend its championship lead to 30 points. A strong opening stint from Hartley earned the No. 2 victory in Mexico, meanwhile team orders were used to gift the No. 2 crew the win at Austin. Though Hartley and Bamber got pole at Fuji, the No. 2 finished fourth in the race behind the sister car, with Toyota having had the edge over Porsche across the weekend. By finishing second in Shanghai, Hartley, Bamber, and Bernhard clinched the drivers' and manufacturers' titles with a round to spare. They capped off Porsche's LMP1 tenure with another second place at Bahrain. Having won Le Mans, the world drivers' championship, and triumphed at the IMSA season-ending Petit Le Mans event, Sportscar365 named Hartley its driver of the year.

=== WeatherTech SportsCar Championship ===
Hartley kept his ties with the American racing scene driving again for Starworks Motorsport in the 2014 and 2015 Daytona 24 Hours. In the 2016 Daytona 24 Hour, he drove with Ford Chip Ganassi Racing. This tie saw him invited to drive for Chip Ganassi's IndyCar team in 2018, but he had to decline due to securing a drive in Formula One with Toro Rosso.

== Formula One ==
=== Red Bull Racing (2008–2010) ===
In February 2008, aged eighteen, Hartley got his first taste of Formula One. He was invited to perform a show run for Red Bull Racing in Riyadh. From here he performed the initial three-day shake-down test for Scuderia Toro Rosso's 2008 spec car, the STR3. In November 2008, it was announced he would be providing cover for Mark Webber, who had broken his leg in a cycling accident, by performing testing duties alongside permanent test driver Sébastien Buemi for Red Bull in the 2008 RB4 F1 car.

For the 2009 season, Hartley was appointed as official reserve driver for both the Red Bull Racing and Scuderia Toro Rosso teams. However, unable to get his mandatory superlicence approved until April 2009, he was replaced in this role by retired F1 driver David Coulthard for the first races in Melbourne and Sepang. Hartley made his debut as reserve and test driver at the Spanish Grand Prix on 8 May. He was the first New Zealander to achieve F1 driver status since Mike Thackwell in 1984. He was replaced in the role by fellow Red Bull Junior driver Jaime Alguersuari for the second half of the season. However, Hartley did not return to the reserve driver role with Red Bull and Toro Rosso following Alguersuari's promotion to a race seat, preferring to focus on his F3 and Renault World Series. Coulthard again took over the role.

For the 2010 season, Hartley was again appointed official reserve driver for both Red Bull Racing and Scuderia Toro Rosso. He shared the reserve driver duties with his Formula Renault 3.5 teammate, Australian Daniel Ricciardo. The two drivers shared the duties on a race-by-race basis until round six of the championship. Following this race, Hartley's support from Red Bull was dropped, based on the fact he had not won a race in his season and a half in the championship.

On 13 September 2012, Hartley participated in the young driver test at Magny-Cours. He drove 87 laps for Mercedes on the final day, setting the third quickest time behind Jules Bianchi (Ferrari) and Rodolfo González (Force India).

=== Mercedes (2012–2013) ===
Hartley said that the simulator development work and the test drive with Mercedes would give him a new opportunity to get back into Formula One.

=== Toro Rosso (2017–2018) ===
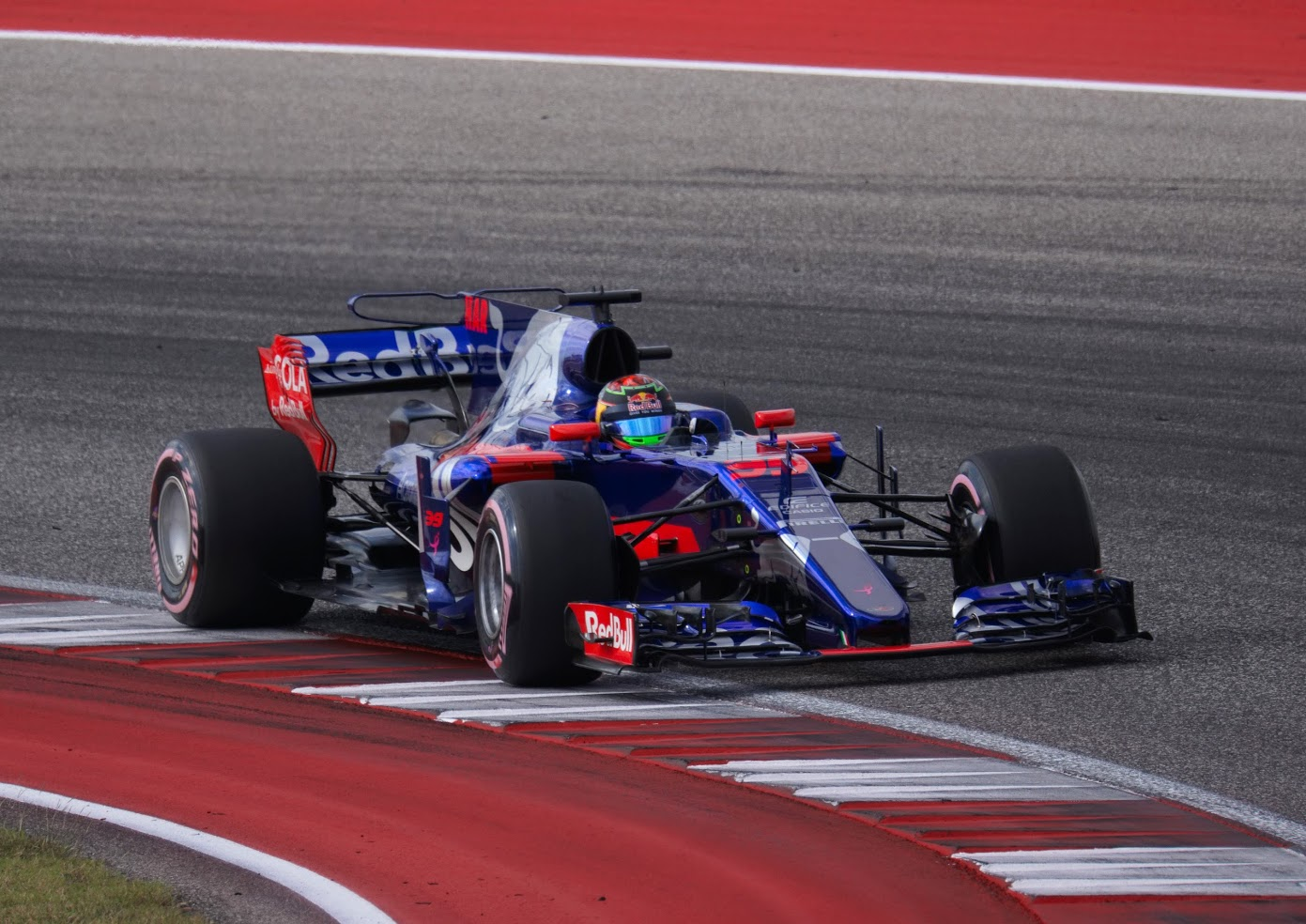
Hartley on his debut at the 2017 United States Grand Prix for Scuderia Toro Rosso

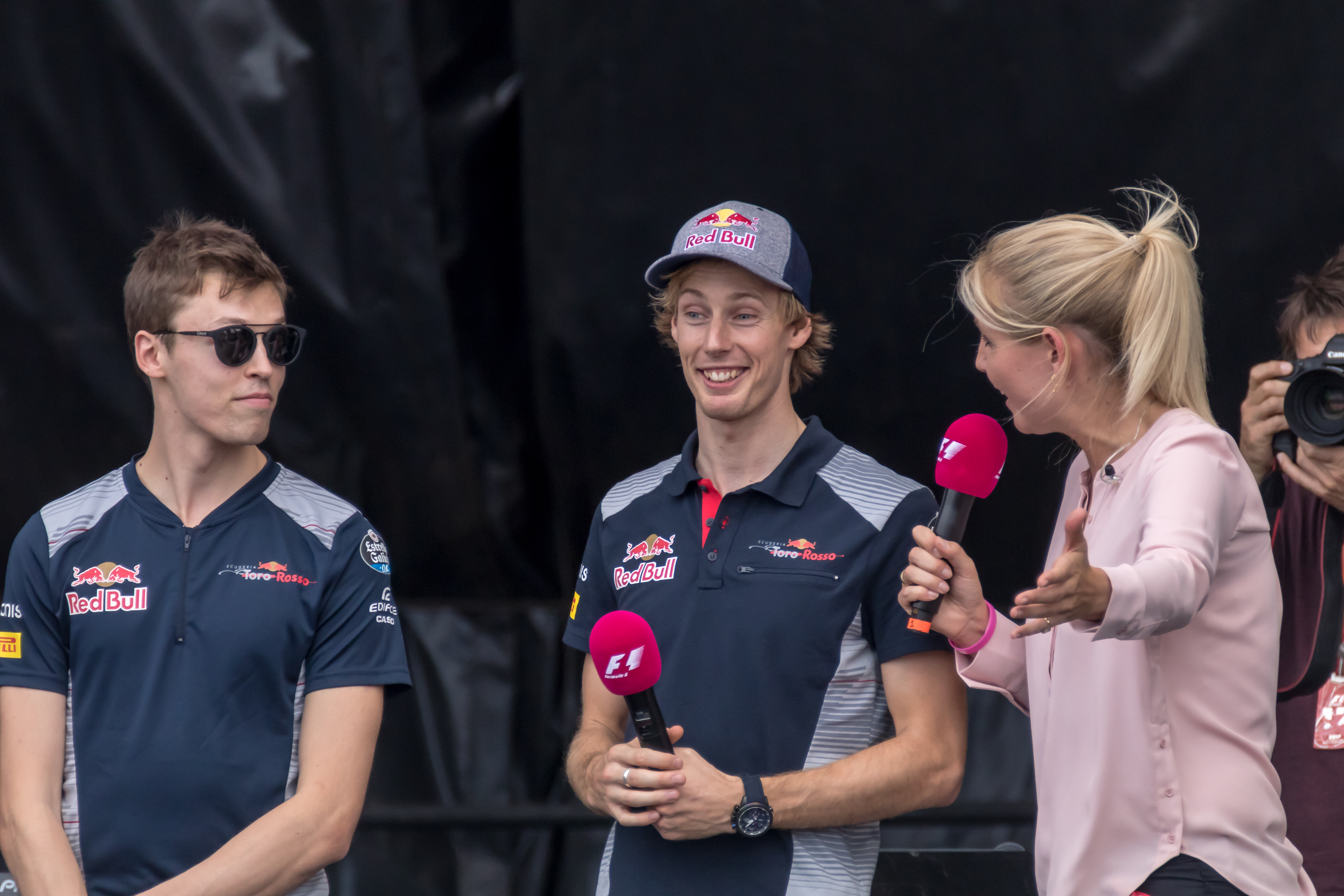
Hartley (center) at the 2017 United States Grand Prix

Hartley made his Formula One debut for Toro Rosso at the 2017 United States Grand Prix, replacing Pierre Gasly, who was absent to take part in the final round of the Super Formula Championship; he raced with the number 39. He qualified in 17th position after being eliminated during Qualifying 1, but started from 19th position due to engine penalties. He finished the race in 13th position, one lap down on race winner Lewis Hamilton. It was confirmed on 26 October that Hartley would remain a Toro Rosso driver for the remainder of the season, replacing Daniil Kvyat, and he chose 28 (the same number previously used by Will Stevens in 2015) as his permanent race number.

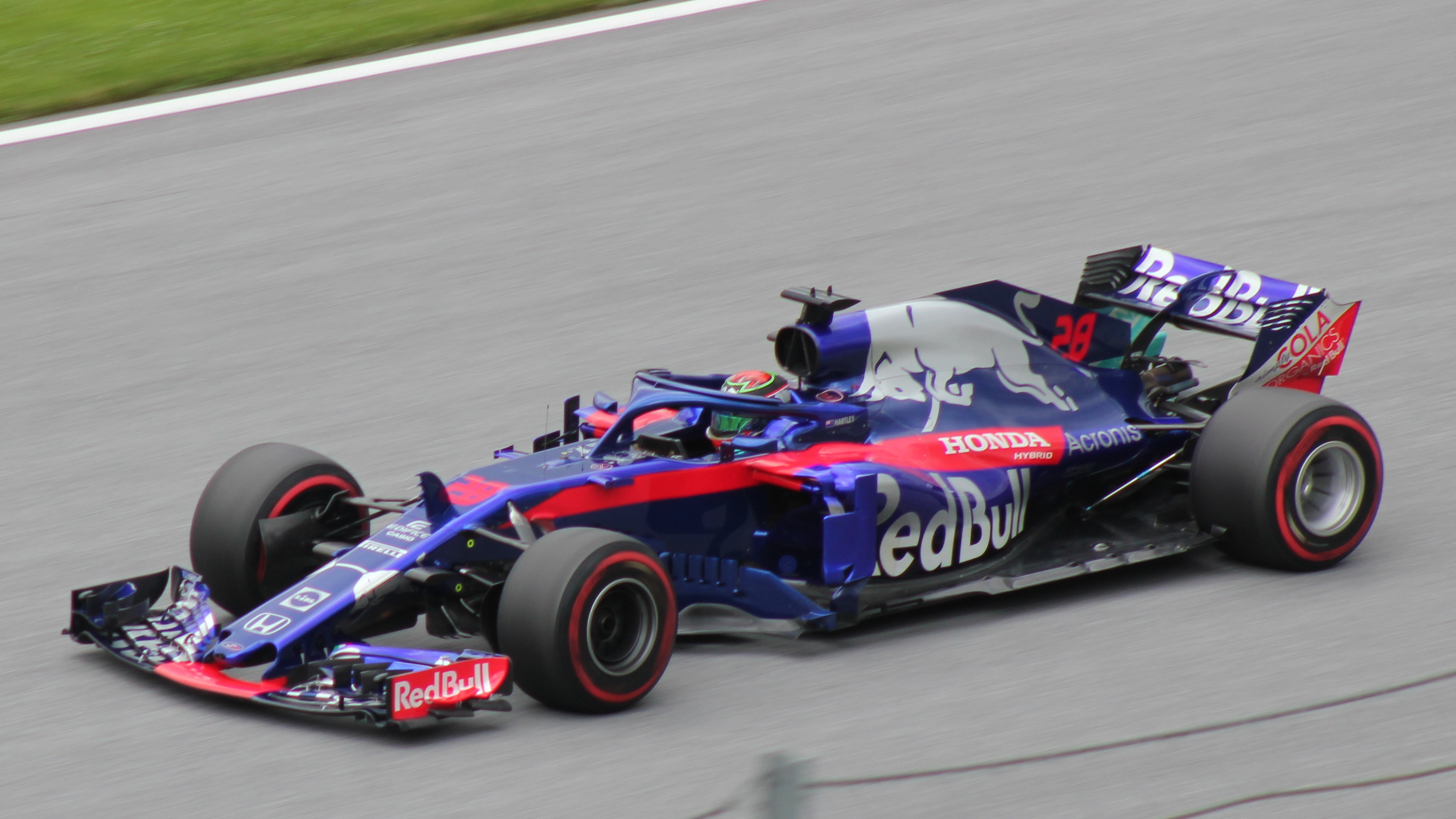
Hartley at the 2018 Austrian Grand Prix

On 16 November 2017, Hartley was confirmed by Toro Rosso as a full-time driver alongside Pierre Gasly for the 2018 season. Hartley scored points at the Azerbaijan Grand Prix with tenth, German Grand Prix with tenth again and the United States Grand Prix with his highest finish in ninth. He finished the season in 19th place, four places and 25 points behind his teammate, albeit with two more non-finishes.

On 26 November 2018, it was confirmed that Hartley would not continue with Toro Rosso for 2019. He was replaced by Thai driver Alexander Albon.

=== Ferrari (2019) ===
On 4 February 2019, Scuderia Ferrari announced that Hartley would be one of their development drivers for the 2019 season, alongside former Manor and Sauber and current Formula E driver Pascal Wehrlein.

== Formula E ==
Following his exit from Formula One, Hartley reunited with Porsche for testing ahead of the manufacturer's debut in the Formula E championship. In August 2019, it was announced he would make his debut in the 2019–20 season with GEOX Dragon Racing, partnering Nico Müller.

Hartley left the Dragon Racing team with immediate effect in July 2020, having scored a lone top-ten finish at Diriyah.

== Return to sportscars (2019–present) ==
=== Comeback (2019) ===
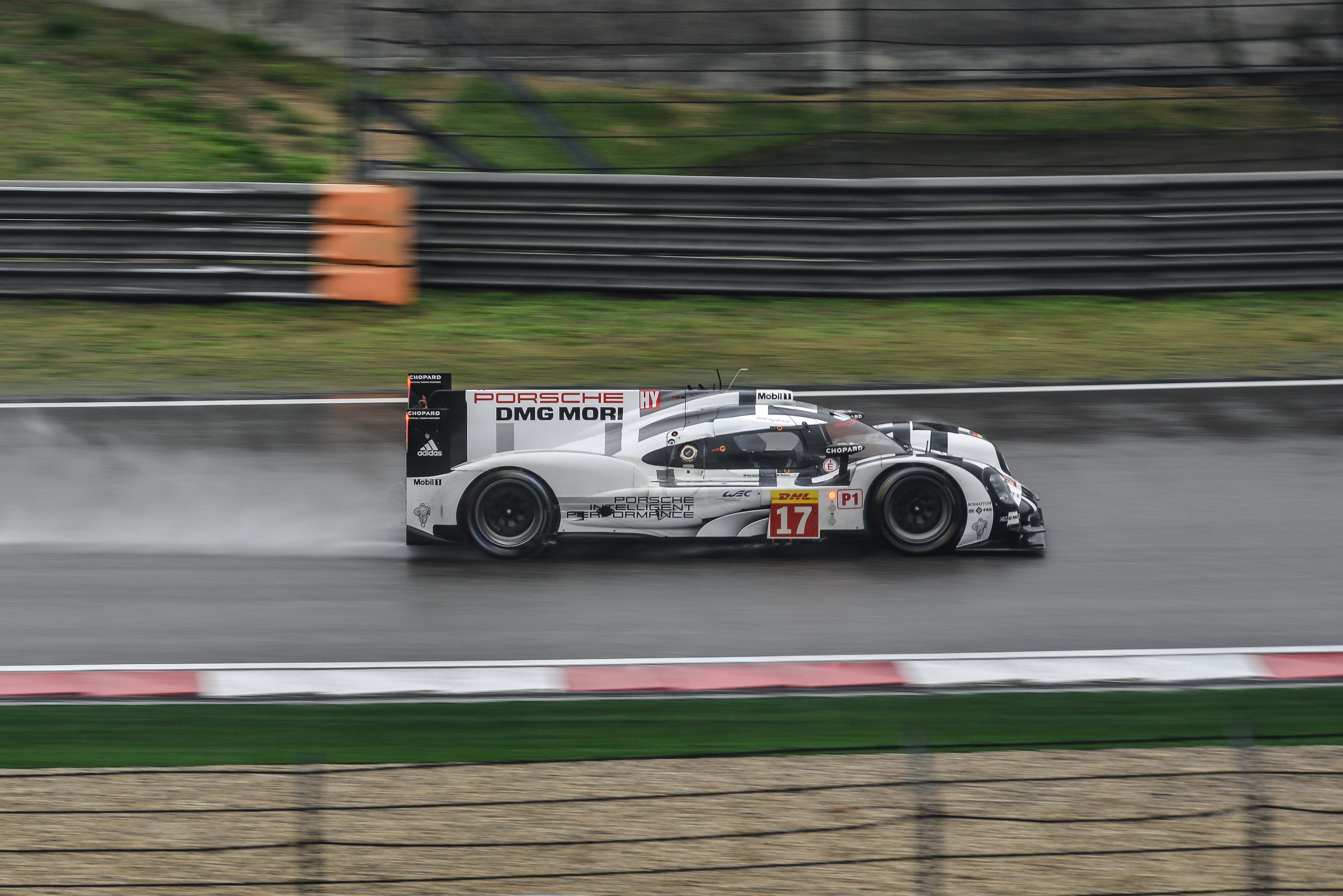
The No. 17 Porsche 919 Hybrid of Timo Bernhard, Brendon Hartley and Mark Webber won four races and the 2015 World Endurance Drivers' Championship.

After one year in Formula One, Hartley returned to the FIA World Endurance Championship at the start of 2019, racing for SMP Racing at the 1000 Miles of Sebring. Having experienced an early tyre failure, Hartley and his teammates recovered to finish third. He also raced for Action Express Racing the day after at the 12 Hours of Sebring, finishing third in a race which included him doing a quadruple stint; Hartley described himself as feeling "completely drained" following the weekend. In May, it was announced that Hartley would join Toyota for the 2019–20 FIA WEC season, replacing two-time Formula One world champion Fernando Alonso. He also stepped away from his roles at Porsche at the end of 2019.

=== Toyota dominance (2019–2023) ===
Going into 2019–20, Hartley partnered Sébastien Buemi and Kazuki Nakajima in Toyota's No. 8. The campaign began with Hartley and his teammates finishing second at Silverstone, having had to let through the faster Kamui Kobayashi in the sister Toyota during the third hour. Hartley and Nakajima secured pole position at round 2 in Fuji, before dominating the race en route to victory. They then finished second at Shanghai, losing out to a dominant Rebellion Racing car. After losing time in a lap 1 accident at Bahrain, the No. 8 crew took home another runner-up finish. Another second place followed at Austin, with the No. 8 benefiting from a success ballast handed to the sister entry. Despite running first early on at Spa, a recurring systems failure dropped Hartley back to second. At the 2020 24 Hours of Le Mans, the No. 8 experienced good fortune: the No. 7 dropped out of contention with a build quality problem concerning the exhaust manifold, allowing Hartley and his teammates to win unchallenged. Though this result brought them to the championship lead, the subsequent success ballast allowed the No. 7 to dominantly win at Bahrain, thus claiming the championship title.

Heading into the 2021 season, Hartley remained with Toyota, now driving the Toyota GR010 Hybrid as part of the new Hypercar class. Hartley and his teammates won the first race of the Hypercar era, the 6 Hours of Spa-Francorchamps. They won again at Portimão, despite Hartley being passed twice by the sister car of Mike Conway. The No. 8 suffered a setback at Monza, where recurring fuel pressure issues demoted them to fourth, 43 laps behind the sister car. At Le Mans, a lap 1 collision caused by the No. 708 Glickenhaus dropped the No. 8 crew back; further issues during the night resulted in a runner-up finish. Hartley qualified on pole for the first of the season-ending Bahrain races. A series of position swaps with the sister car during the race was followed by two slower pit stops for the No. 8 team, causing them to finish second. Hartley and his teammates won the final race at Bahrain, though a runner-up finish for the No. 7 earned them another world championship title.

Hartley took his third Le Mans victory in 2022

In 2022, Hartley and Buemi were joined by Ryo Hirakawa, as the experienced Nakajima retired from active competition. A badly-timed red flag (caused by a crash for the No. 7) caused Hartley and co. to drop back at Sebring; they finished second behind the Alpine entry in the weather-shortened race. Misfortune continued at Spa, where a hybrid failure caused the No. 8 to retire early on. The 24 Hours of Le Mans became a turning point for the crew that season, as Hartley took pole position before driving home to victory, his first Le Mans win for Toyota. In Monza, the No. 8 crew profited from a collision and subsequent penalty for the No. 7, which allowed them to inherit second place. The No. 8 then took an early lead at Fuji; after Hartley drove out a 30-second gap to López in the sister car, his crew were able to claim victory. Hartley qualified on pole for the final race at Bahrain. He, Buemi, and Hirakawa clinched the title by finishing second, as Hartley ceded the lead to Conway during the middle portion of the race.

Hartley and his teammates returned to the No. 8 in 2023. Following a second place at Sebring, a sensor issue for the sister car allowed the No. 8 to win at Portimão. Hartley also got pole for the latter event. At Spa, the No. 8 had to start from the rear of the field after Hartley crashed in qualifying; they recovered to second by the flag. In a highly competitive 24 Hours of Le Mans, the No. 8 lost out on victory to the No. 51 Ferrari, though another second-placed finish extended their championship lead. An incident-filled race followed at Monza, where Hartley charged to fourth late on (including a pass on Antonio Giovinazzi around the outside of Curva Grande), though an energy overuse penalty demoted the No. 8 to sixth. Despite being caught by the Porsche of André Lotterer towards the end of the race at Fuji, Hartley finished second and maintained the championship lead. He qualified on pole for the season finale at Bahrain. The team dominated on their way to victory, which earned them the drivers' championship.

=== Declining results (2024–2025) ===
At the first round of the 2024 season, held in Qatar, Hartley spun in qualifying, forcing the No. 8 to start from 17th. The team mounted a recovery drive to finish fifth. Hartley had two off-track excursions at Imola and was passed late on by Antonio Fuoco, resulting in another fifth-placed finish. After finishing sixth in Spa, Hartley and his teammates placed fifth at Le Mans — Hartley being eliminated from win contention late on after being hit by Alessandro Pier Guidi.

Hartley took fifth during the 2024 24 Hours of Le Mans

Success returned to the No. 8 crew at São Paulo, as a dominant display and issues for the sister car earned them their first victory of the year. A heavy penalty Buemi received for causing a collision resulted in a finish outside of the points at Austin, while an anonymous race resulted in tenth place at Fuji. Though the No. 8 was by now out of the fight for the drivers' title, Toyota remained in contention for the manufacturers' crown, battling Porsche and Ferrari. Hartley earned Toyota another point by qualifying on pole at Bahrain; in a dramatic race, a charging final stint from Buemi allowed the No. 8 to win the race, thus clinching the manufacturers' championship in favour of Toyota.

The 2025 campaign proved to be Toyota's least successful in the Hypercar era (as of 2026). The No. 8 crew finished seventh in the drivers' standings, having scored a lone second place at Bahrain, a race won by the No. 7.

=== 2026 ===
At the 2026 season opener in Imola, Hartley and his teammates used strategy to their advantage to unexpectedly beat Ferrari at their home track, giving Toyota its 50th WEC victory in its 100th start.

== Personal life ==
Hartley lives in Monaco. He is married to Sarah Wilson; the couple got engaged in July 2016 and married in January 2018. Prior to this they had been together for about twelve years. Hartley does mountain biking and road cycling in his free time and can play the guitar.

== Racing record ==
=== Karting career summary ===
Season	Series	Position
1998	CIK Trophy of New Zealand Challenge Cup - Cadet	**1st**
2005	Hawkes Bay 38th Blossom Sprint Meeting - Junior Yamaha GP	4th

=== Circuit racing career summary ===
Season	Series	Team	Races	Wins	Poles	F/Laps	Podiums	Points	Position
2002–03	Formula First New Zealand		6	0	?	?	0	335	8th
2003–04	Formula Ford New Zealand		18	6	6	3	9	239	**2nd**
2005	Toyota Racing Series	GVI	15	3	1	2	7	807	**3rd**
2005–06	Toyota Racing Series	Victory Motorsport	12	1	0	0	8	711	8th
2006	Formula Renault 2.0 NEC	Motorsport Arena	14	0	0	1	1	151	10th
2006	Eurocup Formula Renault 2.0	Motorsport Arena	14	0	0	0	0	21	13th
2006–07	Toyota Racing Series	Mark Petch Motorsport	1	0	0	0	0	0	NC
2007	Eurocup Formula Renault 2.0	Epsilon Red Bull Team	14	4	6	4	8	134	**1st**
2007	Formula Renault 2.0 Italia	Epsilon Red Bull Team	14	1	1	5	5	236	**3rd**
2007	Masters of Formula 3	ASL Mücke Motorsport	1	0	0	0	0	N/A	4th
2007	Macau Grand Prix	Carlin Motorsport	1	0	0	0	0	N/A	12th
2008	British Formula 3 Championship	Carlin Motorsport	22	5	5	4	11	208	**3rd**
2008	Formula 3 Euro Series	Carlin Motorsport	6	0	0	0	0	0	NC^{†}
2008	Formula 3 Euro Series	RC Motorsport	2	0	0	0	0	0	NC^{†}
2008	Masters of Formula 3	Carlin Motorsport	1	0	0	0	0	N/A	5th
2008	Macau Grand Prix	Carlin Motorsport	1	0	0	1	1	N/A	**3rd**
2008	Formula One	Scuderia Toro Rosso	Test driver						
2009	Formula 3 Euro Series	Carlin Motorsport	16	1	0	0	1	15	11th
2009	Macau Grand Prix	Carlin Motorsport	1	0	0	0	0	N/A	NC
2009	Formula Renault 3.5 Series	Tech 1 Racing	13	0	1	3	1	26	15th
2009	Formula One	Scuderia Toro Rosso	Test/Reserve driver						
2009	Formula One	Red Bull Racing	Test/Reserve driver						
2010	Formula Renault 3.5 Series	Tech 1 Racing	11	0	0	2	1	50	10th
2010	Formula Renault 3.5 Series	P1 Motorsport	2	0	0	0	0	50	10th
2010	GP2 Series	Scuderia Coloni	4	0	0	0	0	1	27th
2010	Formula One	Scuderia Toro Rosso	Test/Reserve driver						
2010	Formula One	Red Bull Racing	Test/Reserve driver						
2011	Formula Renault 3.5 Series	Gravity-Charouz Racing	16	0	0	2	3	95	7th
2011	GP2 Series	Ocean Racing Technology	4	0	0	0	0	4	19th
2012	GP2 Series	Ocean Racing Technology	4	0	0	0	0	1	25th
2012	European Le Mans Series - LMP2	Murphy Prototypes	2	0	0	1	1	15	10th
2012	24 Hours of Le Mans - LMP2	Murphy Prototypes	1	0	0	0	0	N/A	DNF
2012	Formula One	Mercedes AMG Petronas F1 Team	Test driver						
2013	Rolex Sports Car Series - DP	Starworks Motorsport	11	1	1	2	2	252	12th
2013	European Le Mans Series - LMP2	Murphy Prototypes	5	1	1	4	2	64	5th
2013	24 Hours of Le Mans - LMP2	Murphy Prototypes	1	0	0	0	0	N/A	6th
2013	Formula One	Mercedes AMG Petronas F1 Team	Test driver						
2014	FIA World Endurance Championship - LMP1	Porsche Team	8	0	1	0	3	64.5	9th
2014	24 Hours of Le Mans - LMP1	Porsche Team	1	0	0	0	0	N/A	NC
2014	United SportsCar Championship - Prototype	Starworks Motorsport	1	0	0	0	0	15	55th
2015	FIA World Endurance Championship - LMP1	Porsche Team	8	4	5	2	6	166	**1st**
2015	24 Hours of Le Mans - LMP1	Porsche Team	1	0	0	0	0	N/A	**2nd**
2015	United SportsCar Championship - Prototype	Starworks Motorsport	1	0	0	0	0	23	30th
2016	FIA World Endurance Championship - LMP1	Porsche Team	9	4	2	3	6	134.5	4th
2016	24 Hours of Le Mans - LMP1	Porsche Team	1	0	0	0	0	N/A	5th
2016	IMSA SportsCar Championship - Prototype	Ford Chip Ganassi Racing	1	0	0	0	0	27	27th
2017	FIA World Endurance Championship - LMP1	Porsche LMP Team	9	4	2	2	8	208	**1st**
2017	24 Hours of Le Mans - LMP1	Porsche LMP Team	1	1	0	0	1	N/A	**1st**
2017	IMSA SportsCar Championship - Prototype	Tequila Patrón ESM	3	1	0	0	1	80	19th
2017	Formula One	Scuderia Toro Rosso	4	0	0	0	0	0	23rd
2017	24H Series - A6	Herberth Motorsport	1	1	0	0	1	0	NC^{†}
2018	Formula One	Red Bull Toro Rosso Honda	21	0	0	0	0	4	19th
2018–19	FIA World Endurance Championship - LMP1	SMP Racing	1	0	0	0	1	19	18th
2019	IMSA SportsCar Championship - DPi	Mustang Sampling Racing	1	0	0	0	1	30	28th
2019	24 Hours of Le Mans - LMP1	Toyota Gazoo Racing	Reserve driver						
2019–20	FIA World Endurance Championship - LMP1	Toyota Gazoo Racing	8	2	1	0	8	202	**2nd**
2019–20	Formula E	GEOX Dragon	5	0	0	0	0	2	23rd
2020	24 Hours of Le Mans - LMP1	Toyota Gazoo Racing	1	1	0	0	1	N/A	**1st**
2021	FIA World Endurance Championship - Hypercar	Toyota Gazoo Racing	6	3	1	1	5	168	**2nd**
2021	24 Hours of Le Mans - Hypercar	Toyota Gazoo Racing	1	0	0	1	1	N/A	**2nd**
2022	FIA World Endurance Championship - Hypercar	Toyota Gazoo Racing	6	2	2	0	5	149	**1st**
2022	24 Hours of Le Mans - Hypercar	Toyota Gazoo Racing	1	1	1	0	1	N/A	**1st**
2022	IMSA SportsCar Championship - DPi	WTR - Konica Minolta Acura	1	0	0	0	0	280	22nd
2023	FIA World Endurance Championship - Hypercar	Toyota Gazoo Racing	7	2	2	0	6	172	**1st**
2023	24 Hours of Le Mans - Hypercar	Toyota Gazoo Racing	1	0	0	0	1	N/A	**2nd**
2023	IMSA SportsCar Championship - GTP	Wayne Taylor Racing with Andretti Autosport	1	0	0	0	1	350	19th
2024	FIA World Endurance Championship - Hypercar	Toyota Gazoo Racing	8	2	1	0	2	109	4th
2024	IMSA SportsCar Championship - GTP	Wayne Taylor Racing with Andretti	3	0	0	0	0	771	21st
2025	FIA World Endurance Championship - Hypercar	Toyota Gazoo Racing	8	0	0	0	1	66	7th
2025	IMSA SportsCar Championship – GTP	Cadillac Wayne Taylor Racing	2	0	0	0	0	508	30th
2026	FIA World Endurance Championship - Hypercar	Toyota Racing	8	3	0	0	4	115	**1st**

^{†} Hartley was ineligible to score points.

=== Complete New Zealand Grand Prix results ===
Year	Team	Car	Qualifying	Main race
2004	(New Zealand) Brendon Hartley	Van Diemen Stealth - Ford	7th	Ret
2006	(New Zealand) Victory Motorsport	Tatuus TT104ZZ - Toyota	?	**3rd**

=== Complete Formula Renault 2.0 NEC results ===
(key) (Races in bold indicate pole position) (Races in italics indicate fastest lap)

Year	Entrant	1	2	3	4	5	6	7	8	9	10	11	12	13	14	15	16	DC	Points
2006	Motorsport Arena	OSC; 1; 12	OSC; 2 Ret	SPA; 1; 5	SPA; 2 Ret	NÜR; 1; 4	NÜR; 2; 4	ZAN; 1; 10	ZAN; 2 Ret	OSC; 1; 4	OSC; 2; 6	ASS; 1	ASS; 2	AND; 1; 6	AND; 2; 3	SAL; 1 Ret	SAL; 2; 7	10th	151

=== Complete Eurocup Formula Renault 2.0 results ===
(key) (Races in bold indicate pole position) (Races in italics indicate fastest lap)

Year	Entrant	1	2	3	4	5	6	7	8	9	10	11	12	13	14	DC	Points
2006	Motorsport Arena	ZOL; 1; 19	ZOL; 2 Ret	IST; 1; 6	IST; 2; 28	MIS; 1; 29	MIS; 2; 5	NÜR; 1; 7	NÜR; 2; 6	DON; 1 Ret	DON; 2; 12	LMS; 1; 12	LMS; 2 Ret	CAT; 1 Ret	CAT; 2; 17	14th	21
2007	Epsilon RedBull	**ZOL**; **1**; 1	ZOL; 2; 1	NÜR; 1 Ret	NÜR; 2; 8	HUN; 1; 1	HUN; 2; 5	DON; 1; 2	DON; 2; 1	**MAG**; **1** Ret	MAG; 2; 3	EST; 1; 3	EST; 2; 3	**CAT**; **1**; 4	CAT; 2; 5	1st	134

=== Complete Formula Renault 2.0 Italia results ===
(key) (Races in bold indicate pole position) (Races in italics indicate fastest lap)

Year	Entrant	1	2	3	4	5	6	7	8	9	10	11	12	13	14	DC	Points
2007	Epsilon Red Bull Team	VLL1; 1; 4	VLL1; 2; 3	VLL2; 1; 2	VLL2; 2 Ret	SPA; 1; 2	SPA; 2; 28	VAL; 1; 9	VAL; 2; 9	MIS; 1; 30	MIS; 2; 8	MUG; 1 Ret	MUG; 2; 2	MNZ; 1; 4	MNZ; 2; 1	3rd	236

=== Complete Macau Grand Prix results ===
Year	Team	Car	Qualifying	Quali Race	Main race
2007	(United Kingdom) Carlin Motorsport	Dallara F305-Mercedes	20th	12th	12th
2008	(United Kingdom) Carlin Motorsport	Dallara F308-Mercedes	11th	NC	**3rd**
2009	(United Kingdom) Carlin Motorsport	Dallara F308-Volkswagen	12th	24th	Ret

=== Complete British Formula Three Championship results ===
(key) (Races in bold indicate pole position) (Races in italics indicate fastest lap)

Year	Entrant	Chassis	Engine	1	2	3	4	5	6	7	8	9	10	11	12	13	14	15	16	17	18	19	20	21	22	DC	Points
2008	Carlin Motorsport	Dallara F308	Mercedes	OUL; 1 Ret	OUL; 2; 4	CRO; 1 Ret	**CRO**; **2**; 1	MOZ; 1; 2	MOZ; 2 Ret	ROC; 1; 10	ROC; 2; 8	SNE; 1; 3	**SNE**; **2** Ret	THR; 1; 1	**THR**; **2**; 1	BRH; 1; 8	BRH; 2 Ret	SPA; 1; 2	SPA; 2; 1	SIL; 1; 2	**SIL**; **2**; 9	**BUC**; **1**; 1	BUC; 2; 3	DON; 1; 2	DON; 2 Ret	3rd	208

=== Complete Formula 3 Euro Series results ===
(key) (Races in bold indicate pole position) (Races in italics indicate fastest lap)

Year	Entrant	Chassis	Engine	1	2	3	4	5	6	7	8	9	10	11	12	13	14	15	16	17	18	19	20	DC	Points
2008	R.C. Motorsport powered by Volkswagen	Dallara F308/077	Volkswagen	HOC; 1	HOC; 2	MUG; 1	MUG; 2	PAU; 1	PAU; 2	NOR; 1	NOR; 2	ZAN; 1	ZAN; 2	NÜR; 1 Ret	NÜR; 2; 14	BRH; 1	BRH; 2							NC^{†}	0^{†}
2008	Carlin Motorsport	Dallara F308/055	Mercedes															CAT; 1; 14	CAT; 2; 6	BUG; 1; 8	BUG; 2; 22	HOC; 1 Ret	HOC; 2; 14	NC^{†}	0^{†}
2009	Carlin Motorsport	Dallara F308/074	Volkswagen	HOC; 1; 19	HOC; 2 Ret	LAU; 1; 4	LAU; 2; 4	NOR; 1 Ret	NOR; 2; 11	ZAN; 1; 10	ZAN; 2; 8	OSC; 1; 21	OSC; 2; 21	NÜR; 1; 22	NÜR; 2; 17	BRH; 1; 8	BRH; 2; 1	CAT; 1	CAT; 2	DIJ; 1 Ret	DIJ; 2; 11	HOC; 1	HOC; 2	11th	15

^{†} As Hartley was a guest driver, he was ineligible to score championship points.

=== Complete Formula Renault 3.5 Series results ===
(key) (Races in bold indicate pole position) (Races in italics indicate fastest lap)

Year	Team	1	2	3	4	5	6	7	8	9	10	11	12	13	14	15	16	17	Pos	Points
2009	Tech 1 Racing	CAT; 1; 12	CAT; 2; 9	SPA; 1; 11	SPA; 2; 10	MON; 1; 17	HUN; 1; 17	HUN; 2; 12	SIL; 1; 5	SIL; 2; 13	BUG; 1	BUG; 2	ALG; 1	ALG; 2	NÜR; 1; 13	**NÜR**; **2**; 2	ARA; 1; 15	ARA; 2; 16	15th	26
2010	Tech 1 Racing	ALC; 1; 6	ALC; 2; 6	SPA; 1 Ret	SPA; 2; 6	MON; 1; 4	BRN; 1; 2	BRN; 2; 6	MAG; 1 Ret	MAG; 2 Ret	HUN; 1; 4	HUN; 2; 9	HOC; 1	HOC; 2					10th	50
2010	P1 Motorsport														SIL; 1 Ret	SIL; 2; 15	CAT; 1	CAT; 2	10th	50
2011	Gravity–Charouz Racing	ALC; 1; 21	ALC; 2 Ret	SPA; 1; 4	SPA; 2; 8	MNZ; 1; 5	MNZ; 2 Ret	MON; 1; 3	NÜR; 1; 15	NÜR; 2; 7	HUN; 1; 8	HUN; 2; 5	SIL; 1; 21	SIL; 2; 7	LEC; 1; 3	LEC; 2; 20	CAT; 1 DNS	CAT; 2; 3	7th	95

=== Complete GP2 Series results ===
(key) (Races in bold indicate pole position) (Races in italics indicate fastest lap)

Year	Entrant	1	2	3	4	5	6	7	8	9	10	11	12	13	14	15	16	17	18	19	20	21	22	23	24	DC	Points
2010	Scuderia Coloni	CAT; FEA	CAT; SPR	MON; FEA	MON; SPR	IST; FEA	IST; SPR	VAL; FEA	VAL; SPR	SIL; FEA	SIL; SPR	HOC; FEA	HOC; SPR	HUN; FEA	HUN; SPR	SPA; FEA	SPA; SPR	MNZ; FEA; Ret	MNZ; SPR; Ret	YMC; FEA; 9	YMC; SPR; 6					27th	1
2011	Ocean Racing Technology	IST; FEA	IST; SPR	CAT; FEA	CAT; SPR	MON; FEA	MON; SPR	VAL; FEA	VAL; SPR	SIL; FEA	SIL; SPR	NÜR; FEA	NÜR; SPR	HUN; FEA	HUN; SPR	SPA; FEA; 5	SPA; SPR; 9	MNZ; FEA; 22	MNZ; SPR; 20							19th	4
2012	Ocean Racing Technology	SEP; FEA	SEP; SPR	BHR1; FEA; 10	BHR1; SPR; Ret	BHR2; FEA; 13	BHR2; SPR; 16	CAT; FEA	CAT; SPR	MON; FEA	MON; SPR	VAL; FEA	VAL; SPR	SIL; FEA	SIL; SPR	HOC; FEA	HOC; SPR	HUN; FEA	HUN; SPR	SPA; FEA	SPA; SPR	MNZ; FEA	MNZ; SPR	MRN; FEA	MRN; SPR	25th	1

=== Complete Formula One results ===
(key) (Races in bold indicate pole position; races in italics indicates fastest lap)

Year	Entrant	Chassis	Engine	1	2	3	4	5	6	7	8	9	10	11	12	13	14	15	16	17	18	19	20	21	WDC	Points
2017	Scuderia Toro Rosso	Toro Rosso STR12	Toro Rosso 1.6 V6 t	AUS	CHN	BHR	RUS	ESP	MON	CAN	AZE	AUT	GBR	HUN	BEL	ITA	SIN	MAL	JPN	USA; 13	MEX; Ret	BRA; Ret	ABU; 15		23rd	0
2018	Red Bull Toro Rosso Honda	Toro Rosso STR13	Honda RA618H 1.6 V6 t	AUS; 15	BHR; 17	CHN; 20^{†}	AZE; 10	ESP; 12	MON; 19^{†}	CAN; Ret	FRA; 14	AUT; Ret	GBR; Ret	GER; 10	HUN; 11	BEL; 14	ITA; Ret	SIN; 17	RUS; Ret	JPN; 13	USA; 9	MEX; 14	BRA; 11	ABU; 12	19th	4

^{†} Did not finish, but was classified as he had completed more than 90% of the race distance.

=== Complete Formula E results ===
(key) (Races in bold indicate pole position; races in italics indicate fastest lap)

Year	Team	Chassis	Powertrain	1	2	3	4	5	6	7	8	9	10	11	Pos	Points
2019–20	GEOX Dragon	Spark SRT05e	Penske EV-4	DIR; 19	DIR; 9	SCL; Ret	MEX; 12	MRK; 19	BER	BER	BER	BER	BER	BER	23rd	2

=== Sportscars results ===
==== Complete 24 Hours of Le Mans results ====
Year	Team	Co-Drivers	Car	Class	Laps	Pos.	Class Pos.
2012	(Republic of Ireland) Murphy Prototypes	(United Kingdom) Jody Firth (United Kingdom) Warren Hughes	Oreca 03-Nissan	LMP2	196	DNF	DNF
2013	(Republic of Ireland) Murphy Prototypes	(India) Karun Chandhok (United States) Mark Patterson	Oreca 03-Nissan	LMP2	319	12th	6th
2014	(Germany) Porsche Team	(Germany) Timo Bernhard (Australia) Mark Webber	Porsche 919 Hybrid	LMP1-H	346	NC	NC
2015	(Germany) Porsche Team	(Germany) Timo Bernhard (Australia) Mark Webber	Porsche 919 Hybrid	LMP1	394	**2nd**	**2nd**
2016	(Germany) Porsche Team	(Germany) Timo Bernhard (Australia) Mark Webber	Porsche 919 Hybrid	LMP1	346	13th	5th
2017	(Germany) Porsche Team	(Germany) Timo Bernhard (New Zealand) Earl Bamber	Porsche 919 Hybrid	LMP1	367	**1st**	**1st**
2020	(Japan) Toyota Gazoo Racing	(Switzerland) Sébastien Buemi (Japan) Kazuki Nakajima	Toyota TS050 Hybrid	LMP1	387	**1st**	**1st**
2021	(Japan) Toyota Gazoo Racing	(Switzerland) Sébastien Buemi (Japan) Kazuki Nakajima	Toyota GR010 Hybrid	Hypercar	369	**2nd**	**2nd**
2022	(Japan) Toyota Gazoo Racing	(Switzerland) Sébastien Buemi (Japan) Ryō Hirakawa	Toyota GR010 Hybrid	Hypercar	380	**1st**	**1st**
2023	(Japan) Toyota Gazoo Racing	(Switzerland) Sébastien Buemi (Japan) Ryō Hirakawa	Toyota GR010 Hybrid	Hypercar	342	**2nd**	**2nd**
2024	(Japan) Toyota Gazoo Racing	(Switzerland) Sébastien Buemi (Japan) Ryō Hirakawa	Toyota GR010 Hybrid	Hypercar	311	5th	5th
2025	(Japan) Toyota Gazoo Racing	(Switzerland) Sébastien Buemi (Japan) Ryō Hirakawa	Toyota GR010 Hybrid	Hypercar	380	15th	15th
2026	(Japan) Toyota Racing	(Switzerland) Sébastien Buemi (Japan) Ryō Hirakawa	Toyota TR010 Hybrid	Hypercar	381	**3rd**	**3rd**

==== Complete European Le Mans Series results ====
(key) (Races in bold indicate pole position) (Races in italics indicate fastest lap)

Year	Team	Class	Car	Engine	1	2	3	4	5	Rank	Points
2012	Murphy Prototypes	LMP2	MG-Oreca 03	Judd-BMW HK 3.6L V8	LEC	DON; 3	PET; Ret			10th	15
2013	Murphy Prototypes	LMP2	Oreca 03	Nissan VK45DE 4.5 L V8	SIL; 7	IMO; 6	RBR; 7	**HUN**; 2	LEC; 1	5th	64

==== Complete FIA World Endurance Championship results ====
Year	Entrant	Class	Chassis	Engine	1	2	3	4	5	6	7	8	9	Rank	Points
2012	Murphy Prototypes	LMP2	Oreca 03	Nissan VK45DE 4.5 L V8	SEB	SPA; 3	LMS; Ret	SIL; 9	SAO	BHR	FUJ	SHA		NC^{†}	0
2013	Murphy Prototypes	LMP2	Oreca 03	Nissan VK45DE 4.5 L V8	SIL	SPA	LMS; 7	SÃO	CTA	FUJ	SHA	BHR		NC^{†}	0
2014	Porsche Team	LMP1	Porsche 919 Hybrid	Porsche 2.0 L Turbo V4 (Hybrid)	SIL; 3	SPA; 12	LMS; NC	COA; 5	FUJ; 3	SHA; 6	BHR; 3	**SÃO**; Ret		9th	64.5
2015	Porsche Team	LMP1	Porsche 919 Hybrid	Porsche 9R9 2.0 L Turbo V4 (Hybrid)	**SIL**; Ret	**SPA**; 3	LMS; 2	NÜR; 1	COA; 1	**FUJ**; 1	**SHA**; 1	**BHR**; 5		1st	166
2016	Porsche Team	LMP1	Porsche 919 Hybrid	Porsche 9R9 2.0 L Turbo V4 (Hybrid)	SIL; Ret	**SPA**; 26	LMS; 10	NÜR; 1	MEX; 1	COA; 1	FUJ; 3	**SHA**; 1	BHR; 3	4th	134.5
2017	Porsche LMP Team	LMP1	Porsche 919 Hybrid	Porsche 9R9 2.0 L Turbo V4 (Hybrid)	SIL; 2	SPA; 3	LMS; 1	NÜR; 1	**MEX**; 1	COA; 1	**FUJ**; 4	SHA; 2	BHR; 2	1st	208
2018–19	SMP Racing	LMP1	BR Engineering BR1	AER P60B 2.4 L Turbo V6	SPA	LMS	SIL	FUJ	SHA	SEB; 3	SPA	LMS		18th	19
2019–20	Toyota Gazoo Racing	LMP1	Toyota TS050 Hybrid	Toyota H8909 2.4 L Turbo V6 (Hybrid)	SIL; 2	**FUJ**; 1	SHA; 2	BHR; 2	COA; 2	SPA; 2	LMS; 1	BHR; 2		2nd	202
2021	Toyota Gazoo Racing	Hypercar	Toyota GR010 Hybrid	Toyota H8909 3.5 L Turbo V6 (Hybrid)	SPA; 1	ALG; 1	MNZ; 4	LMS; 2	**BHR**; 2	BHR; 1				2nd	168
2022	Toyota Gazoo Racing	Hypercar	Toyota GR010 Hybrid	Toyota H8909 3.5 L Turbo V6 (Hybrid)	SEB; 2	SPA; Ret	**LMS**; 1	MNZ; 2	FUJ; 1	**BHR**; 2				1st	149
2023	Toyota Gazoo Racing	Hypercar	Toyota GR010 Hybrid	Toyota H8909 3.5 L Turbo V6 (Hybrid)	SEB; 2	**ALG**; 1	SPA; 2	LMS; 2	MNZ; 6	FUJ; 2	**BHR**; 1			1st	172
2024	Toyota Gazoo Racing	Hypercar	Toyota GR010 Hybrid	Toyota H8909 3.5 L Turbo V6 (Hybrid)	QAT; 8	IMO; 5	SPA; 6	LMS; 5	SÃO; 1	COA; 15	FUJ; 10	**BHR**; 1		4th	109
2025	Toyota Gazoo Racing	Hypercar	Toyota GR010 Hybrid	Toyota H8909 3.5 L Turbo V6 (Hybrid)	QAT; 5	IMO; 5	SPA; 4	LMS; 14	SÃO; 15	COA; 9	FUJ; 16	BHR; 2		7th	66
2026	Toyota Racing	Hypercar	Toyota TR010 Hybrid	Toyota H8909 3.5 L Turbo V6 (Hybrid)	IMO; 1	SPA; 10	LMS; 3	SÃO; 17	COA; 6	FUJ; 1	CAT; 1	MNZ; 10		1st	115

^{†} As Hartley was a guest driver, he was ineligible to score points.

==== Rolex Sports Car Series results ====
(key) (Races in bold indicate pole position, races in italics indicate fastest lap. Results are overall/class)

Year	Entrant	Class	Chassis	Engine	1	2	3	4	5	6	7	8	9	10	11	12	Pos	Points
2013	Starworks Motorsport	DP	Riley Mk XXVI DP	Dinan (BMW) 5.0 L V8	DAY; 14	TXS; 13	**BAR**; 12	ATL; 10	DET; 8	MOH; 10	WGL; 3	IMS; 4	ELK; 1	KAN; 6	LGA; 16	LRP	12th	252

==== IMSA SportsCar Championship ====
Year	Entrant	No	Class	Chassis	Engine	1	2	3	4	5	6	7	8	9	10	11	Rank	Points
2014	Starworks Motorsport	78	P	Riley Mk XXVI DP	Dinan (BMW) 5.0 L V8	DAY; 17	SEB	LBH	LGA	BEL	WGL	MOS	IMS	ELK	COA	PET	55th	15
2015	Starworks Motorsport	7	P	Riley Mk XXVI DP	Dinan (BMW) 5.0 L V8	DAY; 9	SEB; WD^{1}	LBH	LGA	BEL	WGL	MOS	ELK	COA	PET		30th	23
2016	Ford Chip Ganassi Racing	01	P	Ford EcoBoost Riley DP	Ford EcoBoost 3.5 L V6 Turbo	DAY; 5	SEB	LBH	LGA	BEL	WGL	MOS	ELK	COA	PET		27th	27
2017	Tequila Patrón ESM	2 / 22	P	Nissan Onroak DPi	Nissan VR38DETT 3.8 L Turbo V6	DAY; 7	SEB; 10	LBH	COA	BEL	WGL	MOS	ELK	LGA	PET; 1		19th	80
2019	Mustang Sampling Racing	5	DPi	Cadillac DPi-V.R	Cadillac LT4 5.5 L V8	DAY	SEB; 3	LBH	MOH	DET	WGL	MOS	ELK	LGA	PET		28th	30
2022	WTR - Konica Minolta Acura	10	DPi	Acura ARX-05	Acura AR35TT 3.5 L Turbo V6	DAY	SEB	LBH	LGA	MOH	DET	WGL	MOS	ELK	PET; 6		22nd	280
2023	Wayne Taylor Racing with Andretti Autosport	10	GTP	Acura ARX-06	Acura AR24e 2.4 L Turbo V6	DAY; 2	SEB	LBH	LGA	WGL	MOS	ELK	IMS	PET			19th	350
2024	Wayne Taylor Racing with Andretti	10	GTP	Acura ARX-06	Acura AR24e 2.4 L Turbo V6	DAY; 9	SEB; 5	LBH	LGA	DET	WGL	ELK	IMS	PET; 9			21st	771
2025	Cadillac Wayne Taylor Racing	10 / 40	GTP	Cadillac V-Series.R	Cadillac LMC55R 5.5 L V8	DAY; 5	SEB; 11	LBH	LGA	DET	WGL	ELK	IMS	PET			30th	508

^{1} The No. 7 of Starworks Motorsport withdrew from the 12 Hours of Sebring before Practice.

== Notes ==
Sporting positions
Preceded by Filipe Albuquerque	Eurocup Formula Renault 2.0; Champion; 2007	Succeeded by Valtteri Bottas
Preceded by Sébastien Buemi; Anthony Davidson	World Endurance Drivers' Champion; 2015; With: Timo Bernhard & Mark Webber	Succeeded by Romain Dumas; Neel Jani; Marc Lieb
Preceded by Romain Dumas; Neel Jani; Marc Lieb	Winner of the 24 Hours of Le Mans; 2017; With: Earl Bamber & Timo Bernhard	Succeeded by Sébastien Buemi; Kazuki Nakajima; Fernando Alonso
Preceded by Romain Dumas; Neel Jani; Marc Lieb	World Endurance Drivers' Champion; 2017; With: Earl Bamber & Timo Bernhard	Succeeded by Sébastien Buemi; Kazuki Nakajima; Fernando Alonso
Preceded by Sébastien Buemi; Kazuki Nakajima; Fernando Alonso	Winner of the 24 Hours of Le Mans; 2020; With: Sébastien Buemi & Kazuki Nakajima	Succeeded by Mike Conway; Kamui Kobayashi; José María López
Preceded by Mike Conway; Kamui Kobayashi; José María López	Winner of the 24 Hours of Le Mans; 2022; With: Sébastien Buemi & Ryo Hirakawa	Succeeded by James Calado; Antonio Giovinazzi; Alessandro Pier Guidi
Preceded by Mike Conway; Kamui Kobayashi; José María López	World Endurance Drivers' Champion; 2022–2023; With: Sébastien Buemi & Ryo Hirakawa	Succeeded by Kévin Estre; André Lotterer; Laurens Vanthoor
Preceded by James Calado; Antonio Giovinazzi; Alessandro Pier Guidi	World Endurance Drivers Champion; 2026; With: Sébastien Buemi & Ryo Hirakawa	Succeeded by Incumbent
