= Kansas Speedway =

Motorsport track in the United States

- Tri-oval (2001–present)
- Location: 400 Speedway Boulevard, Kansas City, Kansas, United States, 66111
- Coordinates: 39°6′56.84″N 94°49′51.82″W
- Capacity: 48,000
- Owner: NASCAR (2019–present); International Speedway Corporation (2001–2018)
- Operator: NASCAR (2019–present); International Speedway Corporation (2001–2018)
- Broke ground: 25 May 1999; 27 years ago
- Opened: 2 June 2001; 25 years ago
- Construction cost: US$287 million
- Major events: Current: NASCAR Cup Series; Hollywood Casino 400 (2001–present); AdventHealth 400 (2011–present); NASCAR O'Reilly Auto Parts Series; Kansas Lottery 300 (2001–present); NASCAR Truck Series; Heart of Health Care 200 (2001–present); Kubota Tractor 200 (2020, 2022–2024, 2027); Former: IMSA Sportscar Championship; Grand Prix of Kansas (2013–2014); IndyCar Series; RoadRunner Turbo Indy 300 (2001–2010)
- Website: kansasspeedway.com

Tri-oval (2001–present)
- Surface: Asphalt
- Length: 1.500 mi (2.414 km)
- Turns: 4
- Banking: Turns: 17-20° Frontstretch: 10° Backstretch: 5°
- Race lap record: 0:24.8742 ( (South Africa) Tomas Scheckter, Dallara IR-00, 2002, IndyCar)

Road course (2012–present)
- Surface: Asphalt
- Length: 2.370 mi (3.814 km)
- Turns: 9
- Race lap record: 1:09.745 ( (United States) Scott Pruett, Riley Mk XXVI, 2013, DP)

Kansas Speedway (formerly known as Kansas International Speedway in initial planning and construction stages) is a 1.500 mi (2.414 km) tri-oval intermediate speedway in Kansas City, Kansas, United States. The track, since its inaugural season of racing in 2001, has hosted a variety of racing series, including NASCAR, IndyCar, and the IMSA SportsCar Championship. The track has a 48,000-seat capacity as of 2019. Within oval exists an infield road course that is used with the oval to make a "roval". The Speedway is adjacent to the Hollywood Casino, which opened in 2012 and is a joint venture by Penn Entertainment and the track. The venue is currently owned by NASCAR and is led by track president Patrick Warren.

As part of the construction boom of oval tracks in the 1990s, the International Speedway Corporation (ISC) sought to build a track in the Midwest. In 1997, ISC announced plans to build a track in the Kansas City metropolitan area, eventually building it in Wyandotte County, Kansas. Although the track was scheduled to open in 2000, the track faced multiple lawsuits by homeowners who lived in the area, pushing its construction back by months and delaying its opening to 2001. Since 2001, the track has remained in some form within the NASCAR calendar.

== Description ==
=== Configurations ===
The speedway in its current form is measured at 1.500 mi (2.414 km), with the track having a progressive banking system in the turns. Subsequently, the track has 17 degrees of banking at the track's bottom lane, and 20 degrees of banking at the track's top lane in the turns. The frontstretch has 10 degrees of banking, and the backstretch has 5 degrees of banking. Different measurements of length have been used; IndyCar has utilized a length of 1.520 mi (2.446 km) for its races.

Within the track's infield, there is an infield road course that is connected to the main oval track to create a "roval". During the track's construction in 2000, then-track president Grant Lynch stated that initial plans for the track included an infield road course. The road course was constructed in 2012 as part of renovations made to the track. The road course is 2.370 mi (3.814 km) long, with the infield portion of the course having six turns.

=== Amenities ===
The track is served by numerous major roads. The track is next to an intersection of the concurrent Interstate 70, U.S. Route 24, and U.S. Route 40, and Interstate 435. At the time of the track's construction, the complex covered 1,250 acres, had a capacity of around 75,000, and had 65 rows of grandstand seating. As of 2019, the track has a current capacity of 48,000, down from its previous 64,000 according to annual reports from ISC. At its peak, the track had a capacity of 82,000, which occurred in the mid-2000s.

==== Hollywood Casino at Kansas Speedway ====
The Hollywood Casino at Kansas Speedway was approved in 2009 after an initial failed attempt by the track and the Cordish Companies the previous year. The casino is a joint venture by the track and Penn Entertainment, who bought out Cordish. The casino overlooks the track's second turn, features a 268,000 square foot complex, and is themed after the Hollywood area in Los Angeles, California. The casino opened in February 2012.

== Track history ==
=== Initial bids, planning ===
As part of the oval track construction boom in the 1990s, in December 1996, the International Speedway Corporation (ISC) announced preliminary plans to find a location to build a $100 million, 120,000-seat capacity track. An official for ISC, John Story, mentioned that the Kansas City metropolitan area was a suitable area that the company was looking at. In addition, the project was supported by the Kansas City Area Development Council. An initial bid by the city of Gardner, Kansas, was made in February 1997; however, the plan met local opposition and the city eventually backtracked after city officials witnessed the 1997 Daytona 500, realizing that building it in Gardner would be too close to already existing residential development along with heavy traffic congestion. By April, ISC narrowed down their selected sites to 16, which included plots in Platte County, Missouri and Wyandotte County, Kansas.

The next month, ISC was considering using a plot of land near Interstate 29 near the Kansas City International Airport. By July, ISC announced that the Kansas City area was their "No. 1" choice to build the track, asking the area to pay for the track. Three locations were then narrowed down: one in Missouri with the previously mentioned land near Interstate 29, and two locations in Kansas; one plot near Interstate 70 and Interstate 435, and one plot near 110th Street and Parallel Parkway. Officials from both Kansas and Missouri both went to ISC's headquarters to try and convince ISC to build the track in their respective areas, with the project drawing relatively positive public support. By mid-August, Wyandotte County officials entered negotiations with ISC, with local county agencies giving "heavy support" for the project. At the end of negotiations in October, the plot of land near I-70 and I-435 was chosen, with initial plans stating to sit 75,000 with room to expand to 150,000. The track's budget stated amounted to almost $200 million. The track's construction was scheduled to start in the spring of 1998 and was scheduled to be finished sometime in 2000.

Guarantee of a NASCAR Winston Cup race weekend was not given, with the NASCAR Winston Cup Series schedule experiencing growth in the 1990s; a "radical plan" was predicted to be needed in order to get a Winston Cup race weekend. When final negotiations were completed, the project cost later increased to over $252 million, with ISC being offered a tax break until 2027 barring a change in Kansas law; a proposed bill planned to extend the abatement period from 20 years to 30. The tax breaks sparked debates in the Kansas legislature over the length of tax breaks. After passing through both the Kansas House of Representatives and the Kansas Senate, the tax breaks were signed by Bill Graves, the Governor of Kansas.

==== Lawsuits, delays ====
With the purchase of the land from ISC, 146 homeowners along with some property managers were affected by the purchase. As a result, the Unified Government of Wyandotte County and Kansas City made incentive offers to get homeowners to move out of the area. In April, a lawsuit was filed by 11 homeowners to stop ISC and Unified from buying any property, stating that the defendants did not have a final plan to start buying property. By July, the government was considering using the power of eminent domain, with local Kansas law declaring that condemnation could be used if the area is within a "major tourism district". On July 10, the Kansas Supreme Court unanimously decided with ISC and Unified, basing their opinion with the Fifth Amendment in their ruling. Residents then decided to appeal to the Supreme Court of the United States on July 20.

Nine days later, another lawsuit was filed by 13 property owners over insufficient relocation and moving packages. As a result of the lawsuit, the purchase of $95 million of revenue bonds was delayed until the lawsuit was resolved, leading to a potential delay in opening. In response, ISC and Unified made efforts to buy up property for a combined total of around $13 million, with the issue considered settled. However, in September, Donna L. Laughery, a property owner, filed another lawsuit on the basis that she wanted to "learn terms of all contract agreements with property owners" according to her lawyer, accusing the defendants of incentive payments being made out in a discriminatory manner. Attorney Nick Tomasic sought to get the Kansas Supreme Court to directly hear the case to prevent any further delays; however, this was declined by the Kansas Supreme Court. By mid-October, although most residents were expected to move out by the end of the month and ISC was expected to own most of the property needed, the actual construction was still uncertain. A summary judgement was later granted at the end of October, and in November, the case was dismissed. In January 1999, $95.6 million worth of bonds were sold, officially resuming the project. However, an opening date for the track was not stated by Lesa France Kennedy, the executive vice president of ISC.

=== Construction ===
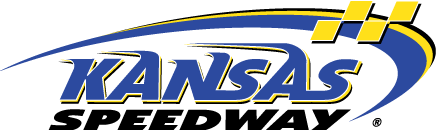
The old Kansas Speedway logo, used from the track's opening until 2024.

Although construction had started several months earlier in September, the project was delayed to the point where chances of an opening date in 2000 were "very small" according to ISC's Grant Lynch. In addition, in sentiments shared by Las Vegas Motor Speedway's Jeff Motley and Texas Motor Speedway's Eddie Gossage, the probability of getting a NASCAR Winston Cup Series race weekend for Kansas International Speedway became increasingly smaller with new dates given out in 1997 and 1998. However, by the end of February, NASCAR's Mike Helton indicated hopes of hosting a race at Kansas; a month later, NASCAR president Bill France Jr. "virtually guaranteed" a race weekend, planning for a race weekend in 2001. Two months later, the Indy Racing League (IRL) announced future races at the track for 2001. By July, although the project experienced further delays due to weather, the track started to sell tickets, with demand being so high that the project's leaders were considering to expand their initial capacity and amount of suites. Within the next two months, the track considered adding Automobile Racing Club of America (ARCA) races and selling naming rights in wake of Charlotte Motor Speedway doing the same earlier in the year. Officials later stated hope of opening the track for private testing in the fall of 2000.

Despite the delays, construction was viewed with "high hopes" by ISC, with the final budget for the track being touted as $287 million in November 1999. In May, officials stated hopes of an official date for its NASCAR Winston Cup Series race weekend within the month; this was later confirmed on May 8, when both IRL and NASCAR's race weekend dates were revealed, with the race weekends being held on July 8 and September 29–30, respectively; the next month, the track considered getting a third race weekend for 2001. Later companion races were announced for IRL were announced on August 1 and September 29, respectively. In September, the track starting paving. Two months later, the track's opening date was moved back to June 2, 2001, with a new race weekend for ARCA and the NASCAR Winston West Series being announced. By February 2001, a new $236.6 million retail outlet development was announced to be built upon 250 acres of land surrounding the track, with an opening date slated for 2002. In April, the first testing runs were made by ARCA driver Ryan Newman.

Aside from the initial criticism and lawsuits from some local residents, the project was met with optimism throughout construction. According to The Kansas City Star, a firm associated with the track predicted a "one-time" event's revenue to rake in $12.8 million in tax revenue, with $6.1 million in the years following after. In a groundbreaking celebration on May 25, 1999, the track received positive reviews from drivers Bobby Labonte, Rusty Wallace, and Ken Schrader. In March 2000, when local Kansas lawmakers visited the track, the track drew praise from state senators Nancey Harrington and Ben Vidricksen. By August 2000, 80% of tickets were sold for its NASCAR Winston Cup Series race. In October, the track was projected by the local city sports council to generate $2.28 billion to the local economy by 2003.

=== Early years ===
The track opened to the public as scheduled on June 2, 2001, with ARCA driver Jason Jarrett winning the first race at the track. The first ever NASCAR Truck Series and Indy Racing League doubleheader followed a month later, with Ricky Hendrick and Eddie Cheever winning their respective races. In September, the track was able to hold its first Winston Cup Series race, with Jeff Gordon winning the inaugural event. The next year, Lynch stepped down from his position, giving control of the track to vice president Jeff Boerger. The track later expanded to include over 80,000 grandstand seats in November. Two years later, the track expanded to 83,000 seats; although 150,000 seats were expected, an uncertain economy led to the track's leaders taking a conservative approach on expansion.

=== Hollywood Casino's beginnings ===
==== Battle for state-owned casino bid ====
Starting in 2004, proposals by the Kickapoo tribe and the Sac and Fox Nation to build a state-regulated casino at a budget of $210 million west of the track were made to the Kansas Legislature. The proposal to allow state-run casinos faced heavy opposition from several businessmen and lobbying groups, stating that the casino's revenue under the bill was too low along with chances of potential government corruption. By March 2005, Doug Mays, speaker of the Kansas House of Representatives, declared that the tribes' compact was killed in the current session unless they allowed the state to inspect slot machines.

Within the next two years, four more proposals were made. In 2007, another proposal was made in a joint venture by the track and the Cordish Corporation to compete with five other proposals that planned to build near the area, including competition from Las Vegas Sands and Pinnacle Entertainment. With this, the Unified Government opted to hear all proposals by the end of the year, with all proposals having varying budgets. The track later stated that their 500-room hotel and casino would cost around $600 million. In October, a seventh proposal was added, along with the track proposal stating that no eminent domain land would be used. By December, the government heard three proposals. The project later received criticism from government watchdog group Americans For Prosperity-Kansas for being too related and being funded by revenue bonds or prior tax financing; something the group argued was illegal under Kansas law. By March 2008, the group filed a lawsuit in the Kansas Supreme Court against the state-owned Kansas Lottery claiming that the project would "create an illegal tax"; however, the law itself was viewed itself as "extremely murky" by Kansas City Star writer Rick Alm on whether the law's wording was retroactive. The next month, Las Vegas Sands opted to submit their proposal despite Kansas Lottery refusing to hear it.

In May, Kansas Lottery approved five proposals in Wyandotte County. On June 27, the Kansas Supreme Court ruled that state-owned casinos were constitutional, resuming the bid for a casino near the track. Two months later, Lesa France Kennedy endorsed the track's bid, adding the promise of a second NASCAR Cup Series race weekend if the Kansas government chose the track's proposal. The next month, the track promised the addition of an infield road course if they were selected. Three days before the decision, Pinnacle withdrew their proposal as part of consequences of Unified Government officials appearing in a promotional video along with stagnation in the United States' economy. On September 19, Kansas Lottery gave the track and the Cordish Corporation their approval to build a $705 million casino branded under the Hard Rock Hotel and Casino name.

==== Casino delays ====
The first phase of opening was slated for a June 2009 date; however, this was later slated to sometime later in the year. In addition, the Cordish Corporation threatened to end their partnership due to a local Kansas City proposed law banning indoor smoking, but they later backtracked the threat; the city later gave exemptions to the casino for smoking. However, in December, as part of consequences due to the Great Recession, the partnership backed out, with the partnership hoping to reapply in the near future when the economy rose. In January, the partnership announced plans to resubmit their proposal by April 1. On March 31, the decision was confirmed, with the partnership now having to go against two other proposals: one from Penn Entertainment and one from Golden Heartland. By May, the Kansas Speedway partnership and Penn Entertainment's proposals managed to advance further into the planning stages. Due to the Great Recession and its effects, both proposals, which initially had budgets of over $600 million, were cut to around $350 million for both proposals.

In September, the two proposals essentially merged into one when Penn Entertainment bought out the Cordish Corporation. As a result of the buyout, the Hard Rock branding was scrapped in favor of a Hollywood-themed casino, with an approval decision for the new $521 million proposal to come in December. Despite being the only proposal left, the Kansas Lottery stated that they would not become a "rubber stamp" for the proposal despite renewed promises of a second NASCAR Cup Series race weekend. On December 1, the Kansas Lottery approved the proposal without the hotel at a budget of $386 million, with a planned opening date in early 2012. The project was given the final go-ahead in February 2010, when the Kansas Racing and Gaming Commission signed off licensing background checks.

==== Construction of Hollywood Casino, schedule changes ====
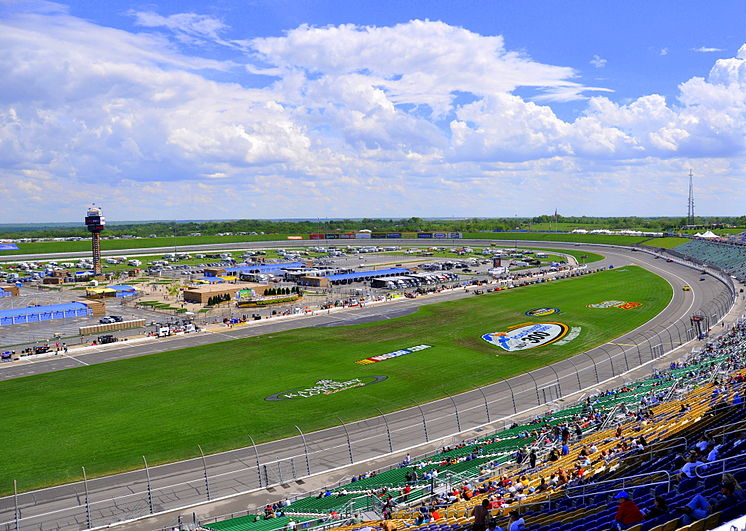
Kansas Speedway, pictured in 2010.

Boreger stepped down from track leadership to run Kansas Entertainment and the casino, promoting the track's vice president of marketing and sales, Patrick Warren, to run the track in March 2010. Warren announced a desire to rebound from effects from the Great Recession. On April 28, the final casino plan was announced, calling for around 2,300 slot machines, around 1,050 employees, and a 300-room hotel expansion on a 268,000 square foot plot of land. Groundbreaking on the Hollywood Casino commenced on April 30, 2010. As a result of France Kennedy's promise of a second Cup Series race weekend if the casino was built, the future of the IndyCar Series at the track was left uncertain due to scheduling conflicts. In July, ISC petitioned for the track to get a second Cup Series race weekend, and by August 7, the Kansas City Star reported that the track would get a second race weekend. On August 10, NASCAR officially confirmed the second NASCAR race weekend, along with the track announcing the addition of lights for night racing. The next month, IndyCar announced their departure from the track. The casino's topping out ceremony was performed on March 23, 2011, with the casino opening to the public on February 3, 2012.

=== Renovations, capacity decline ===
On July 8, 2011, the track announced renovations to the track, including a repaving and reconfiguration of the oval track, and the addition of a new infield road course. Among said changes to the track were an increase of variable banking from 15 degrees to 20 degrees. The track has seen a capacity decline in recent years; according to ISC archive records, the track decreased from a capacity of 64,000 seats to 48,000 in 2019.

== Events ==
=== Racing events ===
==== NASCAR ====
The track hosts two annual NASCAR weekends, highlighted with NASCAR Cup Series races with the spring AdventHealth 400 and the fall Hollywood Casino 400. It also hosts the NASCAR O'Reilly Auto Parts Series' Kansas Lottery 300 and the NASCAR Truck Series' Heart of America 200 as support events for the Cup Series races.

==== Open-wheel racing ====
On May 28, 1999, the Indy Racing League announced races for the 2001 IRL season, with the race being held in July. In 2007, the race was moved to late April from its usual American Independence Day weekend. The track's annual IndyCar race ran annually until 2010, with IndyCar deciding not to renew in 2011 due to schedule conflicts with NASCAR and a second NASCAR race weekend date at the track.

==== Sports car racing ====
In 2012, the Rolex Sports Car Series announced that they would run a Grand Prix event at the newly-constructed road course at the track. The race was first run on August 17, 2013, and was run for a second time in June 2014.

=== Other events ===
The track is one of the Richard Petty Driving Experience's tracks that the general public can drive racecars on; an official announcement was made in 2000. Since 2016, the track has been the host of the American Royal World Series of BBQ competition.

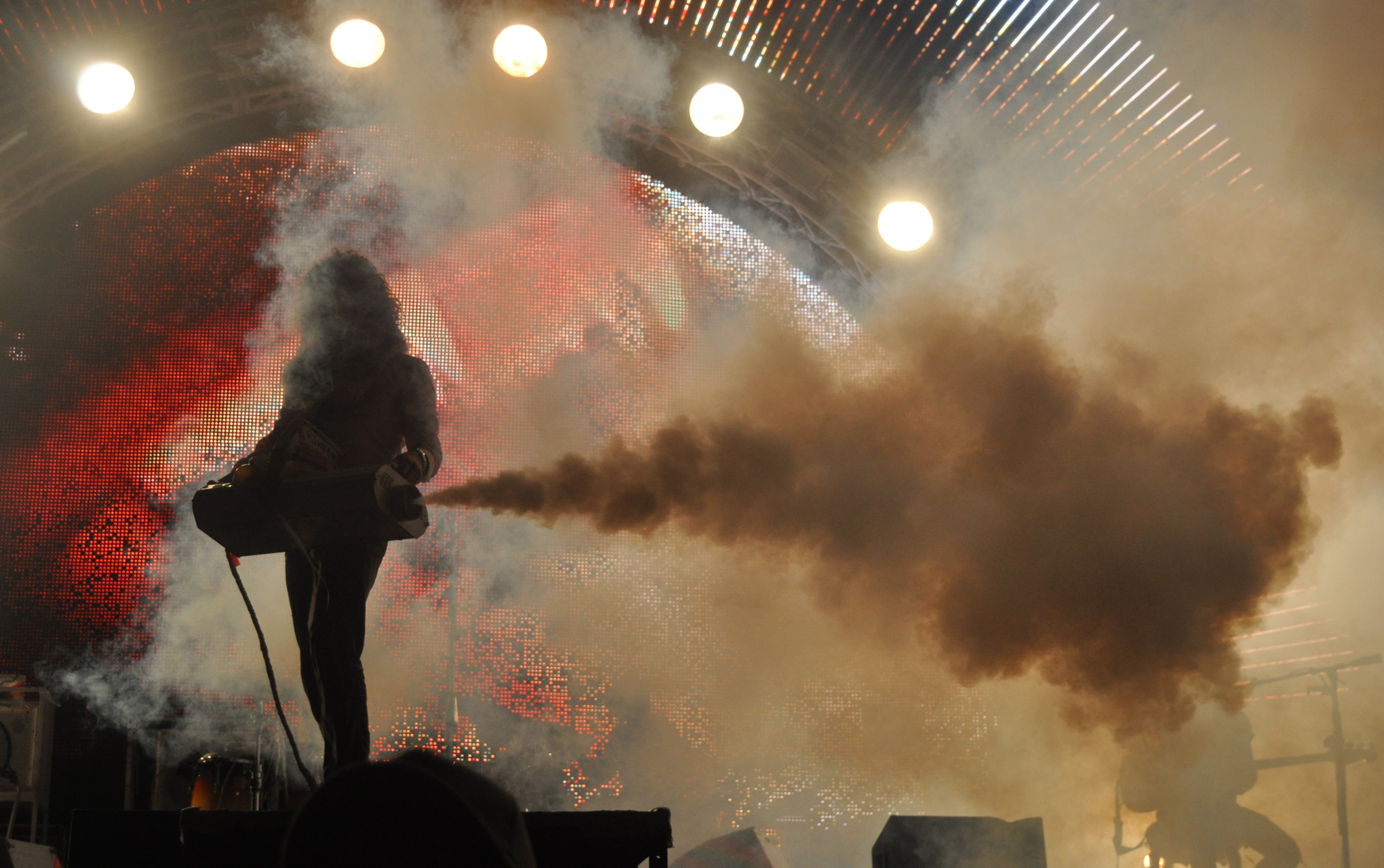
The Flaming Lips performing at the Kanrocksas Music Festival in 2011.

In 2011, the track held the Kanrocksas Music Festival, a rock music festival. The event was first announced on April 26, 2011, and was held in August; the inaugural festival featured acts such as Eminem, The Flaming Lips, Kid Cudi, Primus, and others. In 2013, the event was scheduled to be held in June; however, the event was cancelled in May after a lack of tickets were sold.

== Lap records ==
As of April 2026, the fastest official race lap records at Kansas Speedway are listed as:

Category	Time	Driver	Vehicle	Event
Tri-Oval (2001–present): 1.500 mi (2.414 km)
IndyCar	0:24.8742	Tomas Scheckter	Dallara IR-00	2002 Ameristar Casino Indy 200
NASCAR Cup	0:28.857	Kyle Larson	Chevrolet SS	2015 SpongeBob SquarePants 400
Indy Lights	0:29.1639	Al Unser	Dallara IPS	2004 Aventis Racing for Kids 100
NASCAR Truck	0:30.518	Stewart Friesen	Chevrolet Silverado	2018 37 Kind Days 250
NASCAR Xfinity	0:30.796	Tyler Reddick	Chevrolet Camaro ZL1	2019 Kansas Lottery 300
ARCA Menards	0:30.925	Jack Wood	Chevrolet SS	2026 Tide 150
Road Course (2012–present): 2.370 mi (3.814 km)
Daytona Prototype	1:09.745	Scott Pruett	Riley MkXXVI	2013 SFP Grand Prix
LMPC	1:11.360	Alex Tagliani	Oreca FLM09	2014 Kansas Grand Prix
Grand-Am GT	1:15.013	Jeff Segal	Ferrari 458 Italia Grand-Am	2013 SFP Grand Prix
IMSA Prototype Challenge	1:15.708	Misha Goikhberg	Élan DP02	2014 Kansas IMSA Prototype Lites round
Grand-Am GX	1:21.565	Tom Long	Mazda6 GX	2013 SFP Grand Prix
