= 8 Star Motorsports =

(United States) 8 Star Motorsports
- Founded: November 2012
- Team principal(s): Enzo Potolicchio
- Current series: Cooper Tires Prototype Lites (2013 - present)
- Former series: Indy Lights (2015); United SportsCar Championship (2014); American Le Mans Series (2013)
- Noted drivers: (United States) Dalton Sargeant (2014) (United States) Lamont Harris (2014) (Canada) Remo Rusciti (2014) (United States) Daniel Conway (2014) (United States) Eric Lux (2014) (Mexico) Luis Diaz (2014) (Venezuela) Enzo Potolicchio (2013-2014) (United Kingdom) Robert Huff (2014) (United Kingdom) Tom Kimber-Smith (2014) (United States) Michael Marsal (2014) (United States) Sean Rayhall (2013-2015) (Brazil) Oswaldo Negri (2013) (Venezuela) Christian Potolicchio (2013-2014) (Venezuela) Gianncarlo Potolicchio (2013) (Venezuela) Gustavo Torres (2013)

8 Star Motorsports LLC is a sports car racing team founded by racing driver Enzo Potolicchio in 2012. The team currently races in the United SportsCar Championship PC class and the Cooper Tires Prototype Lites L1.

== History ==
=== 2013 ===
After a business and racing career in Venezuela Enzo Potolicchio emigrated to the US in 2011. He founded 8 Star Motorsports in November 2012. 8 Star Motorsports raced full-time in the 2013 IMSA Prototype Lites season. The team fielded several Venezuelan drivers. Seventeen-year-old Christian Potolicchio scored the best results. The son of the team principal scored one podium finish and ended sixth in the final standings. The team made their debut in the PC class of the American Le Mans Series at the 2013 Petit Le Mans. Sean Rayhall and Oswaldo Negri finished the Oreca FLM09 second in class.

The team also raced in the LMGTE Am class of the 2013 FIA World Endurance Championship. Team principal Enzo Potolicchio and Rui Aguas raced all rounds of the championship supported by various drivers. The Ferrari 458 Italia won its class at the 2013 6 Hours of Spa-Francorchamps and 2013 6 Hours of Shanghai. At the 2013 24 Hours of Le Mans the team finished second in class. The team led several laps and finished tenth.

=== 2014 ===
For 2014 the team joined the newly formed United SportsCar Championship in the PC class. Sean Rayhall, graduating from the IMSA Lites, joined the team full-time. The team fielded two cars at the 2014 24 Hours of Daytona. The car driven by Enzo Potolicchio, Tom Kimber-Smith and Michael Marsal finished tenth overall, second in class.

Rayhall and Luis Diaz scored the team's first win in United SportsCar Championship at Virginia International Raceway and repeated one race later at Circuit of The Americas. 8Star finished 2nd in the PC Teams Championship.

=== 2015 ===
For 2015 8 Star Motorsports joined the Indy Lights ranks. Scott Hargrove joined the team during pre-season testing and in the first two rounds during the Grand Prix of St. Petersburg. The Canadian scored a fourth and a sixth place in both races. Sean Rayhall took over the racing seat from Hargrove. Rayhall raced a partial season. The American won two races, at the Grand Prix of Indianapolis and Mid-Ohio. At the end of the season 8 Star Motorsports sold all its Indy Lights assets to Team Pelfrey.

In the IMSA Lites championship 8 Start Motorsports solely competed at Sebring International Raceway. Christian Potolocchio retired both races.

== Motorsports results ==
=== 24 Hours of Le Mans results ===
Year	Entrant	No	Car	Drivers	Class	Laps	Pos.	Class Pos.
2013	(United States) 8 Star Motorsports	81	Ferrari 458 Italia GT2	(Portugal) Rui Águas (Australia) Jason Bright (Venezuela) Enzo Potolicchio	LMGTE Am	294	37th	10th
2014	(United States) 8 Star Motorsports	90	Ferrari 458 Italia GT2	(United States) Frankie Montecalvo (Italy) Gianluca Roda (Italy) Paolo Ruberti	LMGTE Am	330	23rd	4th

=== Complete Indy Lights results ===
Year	Chassis	Engine	Drivers	1	2	3	4	5	6	7	8	9	10	11	12	13	14	15	16	Points		Position	
2015				STP	STP	LBH	ALA	ALA	IMS	IMS	INDY	TOR	TOR	MIL	IOW	MOH	MOH	LAG	LAG	D.C.	T.C.	D.C.	T.C.
2015	Dallara IL-15	Mazda AER	(Canada) Scott Hargrove (R)	4	6															34	176	14th	5th
2015	Dallara IL-15	Mazda AER	(United States) Sean Rayhall (R)				12	6	2	1*	6					5	1	4	2	188	176	12th	5th
