= 2013 Brickyard Grand Prix =

Track map of Indianapolis Motor Speedway Road Course

The 2013 Brickyard Grand Prix was the eighth race of 2013 Rolex Sports Car Series season. It took place at Indianapolis Motor Speedway on July 26, 2013.

== Entry list ==
Entry List
No.	Team	Car	Driver 1	Driver 2	Driver 3
DP
01	Chip Ganassi Racing with Felix Sabates	Riley-BMW	(United States) Scott Pruett	(Mexico) Memo Rojas	
02	Chip Ganassi Racing with Felix Sabates	Riley-BMW	(United States) Joey Hand	(Brazil) Tony Kanaan	
2	Starworks Motorsport	Riley-BMW	(United Kingdom) Ryan Dalziel	(Venezuela) Alex Popow	
3	8Star Motorsports	Corvette DP	(Venezuela) Enzo Potolicchio	(Canada) Michael Valiante	(France) Stéphane Sarrazin
4	8Star Motorsports	Corvette DP	(Venezuela) Emilio DiGuida	(France) Sébastien Bourdais	
5	Action Express Racing	Corvette DP	(Brazil) Christian Fittipaldi	(Portugal) João Barbosa	
6	Michael Shank Racing	Riley-Ford	(Colombia) Gustavo Yacamán	(United States) A.J. Allmendinger	
8	Starworks Motorsport	Riley-BMW	(United States) Scott Mayer	(New Zealand) Brendon Hartley	(Germany) Pierre Kaffer
9	Action Express Racing	Corvette DP	(United States) Brian Frisselle	(United States) Burt Frisselle	
10	Wayne Taylor Racing	Corvette DP	(Italy) Max Angelelli	(United States) Jordan Taylor	
42	Team Sahlen	Riley-BMW	(United States) Dane Cameron	(United States) Wayne Nonnamaker	
43	Team Sahlen	Riley-BMW	(United States) Joe Nonnamaker	(United States) Will Nonnamaker	
60	Michael Shank Racing	Riley-Ford	(Brazil) Oswaldo Negri Jr.	(United States) John Pew	
77	Doran Racing	Dallara-Ford	(Brazil) Rubens Barrichello	(United States) Doug Peterson	
90	Spirit of Daytona Racing	Corvette DP	(United States) Ricky Taylor	(United Kingdom) Richard Westbrook	
99	GAINSCO/Bob Stallings Racing	Corvette DP	(United States) Jon Fogarty	(United States) Alex Gurney	
GT
18	Mühlner Motorsports America	Porsche 911 GT3 Cup	(Chile) Eduardo Costabal	(Chile) Eliseo Salazar	(Republic of Ireland) Damien Faulkner
24	Audi Sport Customer Racing	Audi R8 Grand-Am	(Portugal) Filipe Albuquerque	(Italy) Edoardo Mortara	
31	Marsh Racing	Chevrolet Corvette	(United States) Eric Curran	(United States) Boris Said	
44	Magnus Racing	Porsche 911 GT3 Cup	(United States) John Potter	(United States) Andy Lally	
46	Fall-Line Motorsports	Audi R8 Grand-Am	(United States) Al Carter	(United States) Charles Espenlaub	(United States) Brett Sandburg
56	AF - Waltrip	Ferrari 458 Italia Grand-Am	(Portugal) Rui Águas	(United States) Robert Kauffman	
57	Stevenson Motorsports	Chevrolet Camaro GT.R	(United States) John Edwards	(Scotland) Robin Liddell	
61	R.Ferri/AIM Motorsport Racing with Ferrari	Ferrari 458 Italia Grand-Am	(Italy) Max Papis	(United States) Jeff Segal	
62	Snow Racing/Wright Motorsports	Porsche 911 GT3 Cup	(United States) Andrew Davis	(United States) Madison Snow	
63	Scuderia Corsa	Ferrari 458 Italia Grand-Am	(Italy) Alessandro Balzan	(United States) Leh Keen	
64	Scuderia Corsa	Ferrari 458 Italia Grand-Am/Crawford	(United States) Rod Randall	(Canada) Kenny Wilden	
69	AIM Autosport Team FXDD with Ferrari	Ferrari 458 Italia Grand-Am	(United States) Emil Assentato	(United States) Anthony Lazzaro	
71	Park Place Motorsports	Porsche 911 GT3 Cup	(United States) Jason Hart	(United States) John McCutchen	
73	Park Place Motorsports	Porsche 911 GT3 Cup	(United States) Patrick Lindsey	(United States) Patrick Long	
93	Turner Motorsports	BMW M3	(United States) Milton Grant	(United States) Carey Grant	(United States) Kevin Grant
94	Turner Motorsports	BMW M3	(Canada) Paul Dalla Lana	(United States) Bill Auberlen	(United States) Billy Johnson
GX
00	Visit Florida Racing/Speedsource	Mazda6 GX	(United States) Joel Miller	(United States) Tristan Nunez	
38	BGB Motorsports	Porsche Cayman GX.R	(United States) Jim Norman	(United States) Spencer Pumpelly	
70	Mazdaspeed/Speedsource	Mazda6 GX	(United States) Tom Long	(Canada) Sylvain Tremblay	

== Qualifying ==
=== Qualifying Results ===
Pole positions in each class are denoted in bold.

Pos	Class	No.	Team	Car	Qualifying	Grid
1	**DP**	**10**	**Wayne Taylor Racing**	**Corvette DP**	**1:22.251**	**1**
2	DP	01	Chip Ganassi Racing with Felix Sabates	Riley / BMW	1:22.375	2
3	DP	6	Michael Shank Racing	Riley / Ford	1:22.455	3
4	DP	5	Action Express Racing	Corvette DP	1:22.544	4
5	DP	3	8 Star Motorsports	Corvette DP	1:22.553	16
6	DP	77	Doran Racing	Dallara / Ford	1:22.572	5
7	DP	99	GAINSCO/Bob Stallings Racing	Corvette DP	1:22.674	6
8	DP	8	Starworks Motorsport	Riley / BMW	1:22.712	7
9	DP	90	Spirit of Daytona Racing	Corvette DP	1:22.831	8
10	DP	02	Chip Ganassi Racing with Felix Sabates	Riley / BMW	1:22.881	9
11	DP	9	Action Express Racing	Corvette DP	1:23.250	10
12	DP	2	Starworks Motorsport	Riley / Ford	1:23.406	11
13	DP	42	Team Sahlen	Riley / BMW	1:23.771	12
14	DP	43	Team Sahlen	Riley / BMW	1:27.841	13
15	**GT**	**31**	**Marsh Racing**	**Chevrolet Corvette**	**1:28.374**	**17**
16	DP	4	8 Star Motorsports	Corvette DP	1:28.485	14
17	GT	57	Stevenson Motorsports	Chevrolet Camaro GT.R	1:28.917	18
18	GT	24	Audi Sport Customer Racing	Audi R8 Grand-Am	1:28.929	19
19	GT	73	Park Place Motorsports	Porsche 911 GT3 Cup	1:29.067	20
20	GT	63	Scuderia Corsa	Ferrari 458 Italia Grand-Am	1:29.157	21
21	GT	62	Snow Racing/Wright Motorsports	Porsche 911 GT3 Cup	1:29.823	22
22	GT	71	Park Place Motorsports	Porsche 911 GT3 Cup	1:29.834	23
23	GT	61	R. Ferri/AIM Motorsport Racing with Ferrari	Ferrari 458 Italia Grand-Am	1:29.933	24
24	GT	46	Fall-Line Motorsports	Audi R8 Grand-Am	1:30.422	25
25	GT	69	AIM Autosport Team FXDD with Ferrari	Ferrari 458 Italia Grand-Am	1:30.436	26
26	GT	94	Turner Motorsport	BMW M3	1:31.323	27
27	GT	44	Magnus Racing	Porsche 911 GT3 Cup	1:31.642	28
28	GT	18	Mühlner Motorsports America	Porsche 911 GT3 Cup	1:32.452	29
29	GT	56	AF - Waltrip	Ferrari 458 Italia Grand-Am	1:32.585	30
30	**GX**	**70**	**Mazdaspeed/Speedsource**	**Mazda6 GX**	**1:33.156**	**31**
31	GT	64	Scuderia Corsa	Ferrari 458 Italia Grand-Am/Crawford	1:34.859	32
32	GX	00	Visit Florida Racing/Speedsource	Mazda6 GX	1:35.184	33
33	GT	93	Turner Motorsport	BMW M3	1:36.561	34
34	GX	38	BGB Motorsports	Porsche Cayman GX.R	1:37.738	35
35	DP	60	Michael Shank Racing	Riley / Ford	No time	15

== Race ==
=== Race results ===
Winners in each class are denoted in bold.

Pos.	Class	No.	Team	Drivers	Chassis	Laps
Pos.	Class	No.	Team	Drivers	Engine	Laps
1	**DP**	**2**	**(United States) Starworks Motorsport**	**(Scotland) Ryan Dalziel** **(Venezuela) Alex Popow**	**Riley Mk. XXVI**	**107**
1	**DP**	**2**	**(United States) Starworks Motorsport**	**(Scotland) Ryan Dalziel** **(Venezuela) Alex Popow**	**BMW 5.0L V8**	**107**
2	DP	01	(United States) Chip Ganassi Racing with Felix Sabates	(United States) Scott Pruett (Mexico) Memo Rojas	Riley Mk. XXVI	107
2	DP	01	(United States) Chip Ganassi Racing with Felix Sabates	(United States) Scott Pruett (Mexico) Memo Rojas	BMW 5.0L V8	107
3	DP	99	(United States) GAINSCO/Bob Stallings Racing	(United States) Jon Fogarty (United States) Alex Gurney	Corvette DP (Riley XXVI)	107
3	DP	99	(United States) GAINSCO/Bob Stallings Racing	(United States) Jon Fogarty (United States) Alex Gurney	Chevrolet 5.0L V8	107
4	DP	8	(United States) Starworks Motorsport	(New Zealand) Brendon Hartley (United States) Scott Mayer (Germany) Pierre Kaffer	Riley Mk. XXVI	107
4	DP	8	(United States) Starworks Motorsport	(New Zealand) Brendon Hartley (United States) Scott Mayer (Germany) Pierre Kaffer	Ford 5.0L V8	107
5	DP	77	(United States) Doran Racing	(Brazil) Rubens Barrichello (United States) Doug Peterson	Dallara (Riley Mk. XXVI)	107
5	DP	77	(United States) Doran Racing	(Brazil) Rubens Barrichello (United States) Doug Peterson	Ford 5.0L V8	107
6	DP	90	(United States) Spirit of Daytona Racing	(United States) Ricky Taylor (United Kingdom) Richard Westbrook	Corvette DP (Coyote)	107
6	DP	90	(United States) Spirit of Daytona Racing	(United States) Ricky Taylor (United Kingdom) Richard Westbrook	Chevrolet 5.0L V8	107
7	DP	60	(United States) Michael Shank Racing	(Brazil) Oswaldo Negri Jr. (United States) John Pew	Riley Mk. XXVI	107
7	DP	60	(United States) Michael Shank Racing	(Brazil) Oswaldo Negri Jr. (United States) John Pew	Ford 5.0L V8	107
8	DP	3	(United States) 8 Star Motorsports	(Venezuela) Enzo Potolicchio (Canada) Michael Valiante (France) Stéphane Sarrazin	Corvette DP (Coyote)	107
8	DP	3	(United States) 8 Star Motorsports	(Venezuela) Enzo Potolicchio (Canada) Michael Valiante (France) Stéphane Sarrazin	Chevrolet 5.0L V8	107
9	DP	02	(United States) Chip Ganassi Racing with Felix Sabates	(United States) Joey Hand (Brazil) Tony Kanaan	Riley Mk. XXVI	106
9	DP	02	(United States) Chip Ganassi Racing with Felix Sabates	(United States) Joey Hand (Brazil) Tony Kanaan	BMW 5.0L V8	106
10	DP	6	(United States) Michael Shank Racing	(United States) A.J. Allmendinger (Colombia) Gustavo Yacamán	Riley Mk. XXVI	106
10	DP	6	(United States) Michael Shank Racing	(United States) A.J. Allmendinger (Colombia) Gustavo Yacamán	Ford 5.0L V8	106
11	DP	4	(United States) 8 Star Motorsports	(France) Sébastien Bourdais (Venezuela) Emilio DiGuida	Corvette DP (Coyote)	106
11	DP	4	(United States) 8 Star Motorsports	(France) Sébastien Bourdais (Venezuela) Emilio DiGuida	Chevrolet 5.0L V8	106
12	DP	42	(United States) Team Sahlen	(United States) Dane Cameron (United States) Wayne Nonnamaker	Riley Mk. XXVI	106
12	DP	42	(United States) Team Sahlen	(United States) Dane Cameron (United States) Wayne Nonnamaker	BMW 5.0L V8	106
13	DP	43	(United States) Team Sahlen	(United States) Joe Nonnamaker (United States) Will Nonnamaker	Riley Mk. XXVI	103
13	DP	43	(United States) Team Sahlen	(United States) Joe Nonnamaker (United States) Will Nonnamaker	BMW 5.0L V8	103
14	**GT**	**61**	**(United States) R. Ferri/AIM Motorsport Racing with Ferrari**	**(Italy) Max Papis** **(United States) Jeff Segal**	**Ferrari 458 Italia Grand-Am**	**103**
14	**GT**	**61**	**(United States) R. Ferri/AIM Motorsport Racing with Ferrari**	**(Italy) Max Papis** **(United States) Jeff Segal**	**Ferrari 4.5L V8**	**103**
15	GT	57	(United States) Stevenson Motorsports	(United States) John Edwards (Scotland) Robin Liddell	Chevrolet Camaro GT.R	103
15	GT	57	(United States) Stevenson Motorsports	(United States) John Edwards (Scotland) Robin Liddell	Chevrolet 6.2L V8	103
16	GT	44	(United States) Magnus Racing	(United States) Andy Lally (United States) John Potter	Porsche 911 GT3 Cup	103
16	GT	44	(United States) Magnus Racing	(United States) Andy Lally (United States) John Potter	Porsche 4.0L F6	103
17	GT	69	(United States) AIM Autosport Team FXDD with Ferrari	(United States) Emil Assentato (United States) Anthony Lazzaro	Ferrari 458 Italia Grand-Am	103
17	GT	69	(United States) AIM Autosport Team FXDD with Ferrari	(United States) Emil Assentato (United States) Anthony Lazzaro	Ferrari 4.5L V8	103
18	GT	63	(United States) Scuderia Corsa	(Italy) Alessandro Balzan (United States) Leh Keen	Ferrari 458 Italia Grand-Am	103
18	GT	63	(United States) Scuderia Corsa	(Italy) Alessandro Balzan (United States) Leh Keen	Ferrari 4.5L V8	103
19	GT	64	(United States) Scuderia Corsa	(United States) Rod Randall (Canada) Kenny Wilden	Ferrari 458 Italia Grand-Am/Crawford	103
19	GT	64	(United States) Scuderia Corsa	(United States) Rod Randall (Canada) Kenny Wilden	Ferrari 4.5L V8	103
20	GT	62	(United States) Snow Racing/Wright Motorsports	(United States) Andrew Davis (United States) Madison Snow	Porsche 911 GT3 Cup	102
20	GT	62	(United States) Snow Racing/Wright Motorsports	(United States) Andrew Davis (United States) Madison Snow	Porsche 4.0L F6	102
21	GT	31	(United States) Marsh Racing	(United States) Eric Curran (United States) Boris Said	Chevrolet Corvette	102
21	GT	31	(United States) Marsh Racing	(United States) Eric Curran (United States) Boris Said	Chevrolet 6.2L V8	102
22	GT	46	(United States) Fall-Line Motorsports	(United States) Al Carter (United States) Charles Espenlaub (United States) Brett Sandburg	Audi R8 Grand-Am	102
22	GT	46	(United States) Fall-Line Motorsports	(United States) Al Carter (United States) Charles Espenlaub (United States) Brett Sandburg	Audi 5.2L V10	102
23	GT	71	(United States) Park Place Motorsports	(United States) Jason Hart (United States) John McCutchen	Porsche 911 GT3 Cup	101
23	GT	71	(United States) Park Place Motorsports	(United States) Jason Hart (United States) John McCutchen	Porsche 4.0L F6	101
24	DP	5	(United States) Action Express Racing	(Brazil) Christian Fittipaldi (Portugal) João Barbosa	Corvette DP (Coyote)	101
24	DP	5	(United States) Action Express Racing	(Brazil) Christian Fittipaldi (Portugal) João Barbosa	Chevrolet 5.0L V8	101
25 DNF	DP	10	(United States) Wayne Taylor Racing	(Italy) Max Angelelli (United States) Jordan Taylor	Corvette DP (Dallara)	97
25 DNF	DP	10	(United States) Wayne Taylor Racing	(Italy) Max Angelelli (United States) Jordan Taylor	Chevrolet 5.0L V8	97
26	**GX**	**70**	**(United States) Mazdaspeed/Speedsource**	**(United States) Tom Long** **(Canada) Sylvain Tremblay**	**Mazda6 GX**	**96**
26	**GX**	**70**	**(United States) Mazdaspeed/Speedsource**	**(United States) Tom Long** **(Canada) Sylvain Tremblay**	**Mazda 2.2L I4 Diesel**	**96**
27 DNF	GT	73	(United States) Park Place Motorsports	(United States) Patrick Lindsey (United States) Patrick Long	Porsche 911 GT3 Cup	95
27 DNF	GT	73	(United States) Park Place Motorsports	(United States) Patrick Lindsey (United States) Patrick Long	Porsche 4.0L F6	95
28	GX	38	(United States) BGB Motorsports	(United States) Jim Norman (United States) Spencer Pumpelly	Porsche Cayman GX.R	92
28	GX	38	(United States) BGB Motorsports	(United States) Jim Norman (United States) Spencer Pumpelly	Porsche 3.8L F6	92
29	GX	00	(United States) Visit Florida Racing/Speedsource	(United States) Joel Miller (United States) Tristan Nunez	Mazda6 GX	92
29	GX	00	(United States) Visit Florida Racing/Speedsource	(United States) Joel Miller (United States) Tristan Nunez	Mazda 2.2L I4 Diesel	92
30 DNF	DP	9	(United States) Action Express Racing	(United States) Brian Frisselle (United States) Burt Frisselle	Corvette DP (Coyote)	81
30 DNF	DP	9	(United States) Action Express Racing	(United States) Brian Frisselle (United States) Burt Frisselle	Chevrolet 5.0L V8	81
31	GT	94	(United States) Turner Motorsport	(Canada) Paul Dalla Lana (United States) Bill Auberlen (United States) Billy Johnson	BMW M3	75
31	GT	94	(United States) Turner Motorsport	(Canada) Paul Dalla Lana (United States) Bill Auberlen (United States) Billy Johnson	BMW 5.0L V8	75
32 DNF	GT	93	(United States) Turner Motorsport	(United States) Milton Grant (United States) Carey Grant (United States) Kevin Grant	BMW M3	64
32 DNF	GT	93	(United States) Turner Motorsport	(United States) Milton Grant (United States) Carey Grant (United States) Kevin Grant	BMW 5.0L V8	64
33 DNF	GT	24	(United States) Audi Sport Customer Racing	(Portugal) Filipe Albuquerque (Italy) Edoardo Mortara	Audi R8 Grand-Am	40
33 DNF	GT	24	(United States) Audi Sport Customer Racing	(Portugal) Filipe Albuquerque (Italy) Edoardo Mortara	Audi 5.2L V10	40
34 DNF	GT	18	(Belgium) Mühlner Motorsports America	(Chile) Eduardo Costabal (Chile) Eliseo Salazar (Republic of Ireland) Damien Faulkner	Porsche 911 GT3 Cup	23
34 DNF	GT	18	(Belgium) Mühlner Motorsports America	(Chile) Eduardo Costabal (Chile) Eliseo Salazar (Republic of Ireland) Damien Faulkner	Porsche 4.0L F6	23
35 DNF	GT	56	(United States) AF - Waltrip	(Portugal) Rui Águas (United States) Robert Kauffman	Ferrari 458 Italia Grand-Am	21
35 DNF	GT	56	(United States) AF - Waltrip	(Portugal) Rui Águas (United States) Robert Kauffman	Ferrari 4.5L V8	21

Preceded by 2013 6 Hours of The Glen	Rolex Sports Car Series; 2013	Succeeded by 2013 VisitFlorida.com Sports Car 250
