= 2013 Chevrolet Grand-Am 200 =

Track map of The Raceway on Belle Isle

The 2013 Chevrolet Grand-Am 200 was the fifth race of 2013 Rolex Sports Car Series season. It took place at The Raceway on Belle Isle on June 1, 2013.

== Entry list ==
Entry List
No.	Team	Car	Driver 1	Driver 2	Driver 3
DP
01	Chip Ganassi Racing with Felix Sabates	Riley-BMW	(United States) Scott Pruett	(Mexico) Memo Rojas	
2	Starworks Motorsport	Riley-Ford	(United Kingdom) Ryan Dalziel	(Venezuela) Alex Popow	
3	8Star Motorsports	Corvette DP	(Venezuela) Enzo Potolicchio	(France) Stéphane Sarrazin	(Portugal) Pedro Lamy
5	Action Express Racing	Corvette DP	(Brazil) Christian Fittipaldi	(Portugal) João Barbosa	
6	Michael Shank Racing	Riley-Ford	(Colombia) Gustavo Yacamán	(Brazil) Antônio Pizzonia	
8	Starworks Motorsport	Riley-Ford	(United States) Scott Mayer	(New Zealand) Brendon Hartley	
9	Action Express Racing	Corvette DP	(United States) Brian Frisselle	(United States) Burt Frisselle	
10	Wayne Taylor Racing	Corvette DP	(Italy) Max Angelelli	(United States) Jordan Taylor	
42	Team Sahlen	Riley-BMW	(United States) Dane Cameron	(United States) Wayne Nonnamaker	
43	Team Sahlen	Riley-BMW	(United States) Joe Nonnamaker	(United States) Will Nonnamaker	(United States) Wayne Nonnamaker
60	Michael Shank Racing	Riley-Ford	(Canada) Michael Valiante	(United States) John Pew	
90	Spirit of Daytona Racing	Corvette DP	(United States) Ricky Taylor	(United Kingdom) Richard Westbrook	
99	GAINSCO/Bob Stallings Racing	Corvette DP	(United States) Jon Fogarty	(United States) Alex Gurney	
GT
18	Mühlner Motorsports America	Porsche 911 GT3 Cup	(United States) Tomy Drissi	(South Africa) Dion von Moltke	
31	Marsh Racing	Chevrolet Corvette	(United States) Eric Curran	(United States) Boris Said	
44	Magnus Racing	Porsche 911 GT3 Cup	(United States) John Potter	(United States) Andy Lally	
57	Stevenson Motorsports	Chevrolet Camaro GT.R	(United States) John Edwards	(Scotland) Robin Liddell	
61	R.Ferri/AIM Motorsport Racing with Ferrari	Ferrari 458 Italia Grand-Am	(Italy) Max Papis	(United States) Jeff Segal	
63	Scuderia Corsa Michelotto	Ferrari 458 Italia Grand-Am	(Italy) Alessandro Balzan	(United States) Jeff Westphal	
69	AIM Autosport Team FXDD with Ferrari	Ferrari 458 Italia Grand-Am	(United States) Emil Assentato	(United States) Anthony Lazzaro	
73	Park Place Motorsports	Porsche 911 GT3 Cup	(United States) Patrick Lindsey	(United States) Patrick Long	
93	Turner Motorsports	BMW M3	(United States) Michael Marsal	(Canada) Gunter Schaldach	(United States) Billy Johnson
94	Turner Motorsports	BMW M3	(Canada) Paul Dalla Lana	(United States) Bill Auberlen	(United States) Billy Johnson
GX
00	Visit Florida Racing/Speedsource	Mazda6 GX	(United States) Joel Miller	(United States) Tristan Nunez	
38	BGB Motorsports	Porsche Cayman GX.R	(United States) Jim Norman	(United States) Spencer Pumpelly	
70	Mazdaspeed/Speedsource	Mazda6 GX	(United States) Tom Long	(Canada) Sylvain Tremblay	

== Qualifying ==
=== Qualifying Results ===
Pole positions in each class are denoted in bold.

Pos	Class	No.	Team	Car	Qualifying	Grid
1	**DP**	**10**	**Wayne Taylor Racing**	**Corvette DP**	**1:27.675**	**1**
2	DP	99	GAINSCO/Bob Stallings Racing	Corvette DP	1:27.802	2
3	DP	2	Starworks Motorsport	Riley / Ford	1:27.817	3
4	DP	3	8 Star Motorsports	Corvette DP	1:27.862	4
5	DP	90	Spirit of Daytona Racing	Corvette DP	1:27.953	5
6	DP	5	Action Express Racing	Corvette DP	1:27.954	6
7	DP	01	Chip Ganassi Racing with Felix Sabates	Riley / BMW	1:28.460	7
8	DP	6	Michael Shank Racing	Riley / Ford	1:28.572	8
9	DP	9	Action Express Racing	Corvette DP	1:28.580	9
10	DP	60	Michael Shank Racing	Riley / Ford	1:28.774	10
11	DP	42	Team Sahlen	Riley / BMW	1:29.576	11
12	DP	43	Team Sahlen	Riley / BMW	1:33.492	12
13	**GT**	**61**	**R. Ferri/AIM Motorsport Racing with Ferrari**	**Ferrari 458 Italia Grand-Am**	**1:35.171**	**14**
14	DP	8	Starworks Motorsport	Riley / Ford	1:35.552	13
15	GT	31	Marsh Racing	Chevrolet Corvette	1:35.583	15
16	GT	63	Scuderia Corsa Michelotto	Ferrari 458 Italia Grand-Am	1:35.611	16
17	GT	69	AIM Autosport Team FXDD with Ferrari	Ferrari 458 Italia Grand-Am	1:35.868	17
18	GT	57	Stevenson Motorsports	Chevrolet Camaro GT.R	1:36.119	18
19	GT	44	Magnus Racing	Porsche 911 GT3 Cup	1:36.913	19
20	GT	73	Park Place Motorsports	Porsche 911 GT3 Cup	1:37.032	20
21	GT	93	Turner Motorsport	BMW M3	1:38.102	21
22	GT	18	Mühlner Motorsports America	Porsche 911 GT3 Cup	1:38.141	22
23	**GX**	**70**	**Mazdaspeed/Speedsource**	**Mazda6 GX**	**1:41.638**	**23**
24	GX	38	BGB Motorsports	Porsche Cayman GX.R	1:43.161	24
25	GX	00	Visit Florida Racing/Speedsource	Mazda6 GX	1:43.302	25
26	GT	94	Turner Motorsport	BMW M3	No time	26

== Race ==
=== Race results ===
Winners in each class are denoted in bold.

Pos.	Class	No.	Team	Drivers	Chassis	Laps
Pos.	Class	No.	Team	Drivers	Engine	Laps
1	**DP**	**10**	**(United States) Wayne Taylor Racing**	**(Italy) Max Angelelli** **(United States) Jordan Taylor**	**Corvette DP (Dallara)**	**61**
1	**DP**	**10**	**(United States) Wayne Taylor Racing**	**(Italy) Max Angelelli** **(United States) Jordan Taylor**	**Chevrolet 5.0L V8**	**61**
2	DP	5	(United States) Action Express Racing	(Brazil) Christian Fittipaldi (Portugal) João Barbosa	Corvette DP (Coyote)	61
2	DP	5	(United States) Action Express Racing	(Brazil) Christian Fittipaldi (Portugal) João Barbosa	Chevrolet 5.0L V8	61
3	DP	2	(United States) Starworks Motorsport	(Scotland) Ryan Dalziel (Venezuela) Alex Popow	Riley Mk. XXVI	61
3	DP	2	(United States) Starworks Motorsport	(Scotland) Ryan Dalziel (Venezuela) Alex Popow	Ford 5.0L V8	61
4	DP	42	(United States) Team Sahlen	(United States) Dane Cameron (United States) Wayne Nonnamaker	Riley Mk. XXVI	61
4	DP	42	(United States) Team Sahlen	(United States) Dane Cameron (United States) Wayne Nonnamaker	BMW 5.0L V8	61
5	DP	90	(United States) Spirit of Daytona Racing	(United States) Ricky Taylor (United Kingdom) Richard Westbrook	Corvette DP (Coyote)	61
5	DP	90	(United States) Spirit of Daytona Racing	(United States) Ricky Taylor (United Kingdom) Richard Westbrook	Chevrolet 5.0L V8	61
6	DP	99	(United States) GAINSCO/Bob Stallings Racing	(United States) Jon Fogarty (United States) Alex Gurney	Corvette DP (Riley XXVI)	61
6	DP	99	(United States) GAINSCO/Bob Stallings Racing	(United States) Jon Fogarty (United States) Alex Gurney	Chevrolet 5.0L V8	61
7	DP	6	(United States) Michael Shank Racing	(Brazil) Antonio Pizzonia (Colombia) Gustavo Yacamán	Riley Mk. XXVI	61
7	DP	6	(United States) Michael Shank Racing	(Brazil) Antonio Pizzonia (Colombia) Gustavo Yacamán	Ford 5.0L V8	61
8	DP	8	(United States) Starworks Motorsport	(New Zealand) Brendon Hartley (United States) Scott Mayer	Riley Mk. XXVI	60
8	DP	8	(United States) Starworks Motorsport	(New Zealand) Brendon Hartley (United States) Scott Mayer	Ford 5.0L V8	60
9	DP	43	(United States) Team Sahlen	(United States) Joe Nonnamaker (United States) Will Nonnamaker (United States) Wayne Nonnamaker	Riley Mk. XXVI	60
9	DP	43	(United States) Team Sahlen	(United States) Joe Nonnamaker (United States) Will Nonnamaker (United States) Wayne Nonnamaker	BMW 5.0L V8	60
10	**GT**	**57**	**(United States) Stevenson Motorsports**	**(United States) John Edwards** **(Scotland) Robin Liddell**	**Chevrolet Camaro GT.R**	**60**
10	**GT**	**57**	**(United States) Stevenson Motorsports**	**(United States) John Edwards** **(Scotland) Robin Liddell**	**Chevrolet 6.2L V8**	**60**
11	GT	63	(United States) Scuderia Corsa Michelotto	(Italy) Alessandro Balzan (United States) Jeff Westphal	Ferrari 458 Italia Grand-Am	60
11	GT	63	(United States) Scuderia Corsa Michelotto	(Italy) Alessandro Balzan (United States) Jeff Westphal	Ferrari 4.5L V8	60
12	GT	61	(United States) R. Ferri/AIM Motorsport Racing with Ferrari	(Italy) Max Papis (United States) Jeff Segal	Ferrari 458 Italia Grand-Am	60
12	GT	61	(United States) R. Ferri/AIM Motorsport Racing with Ferrari	(Italy) Max Papis (United States) Jeff Segal	Ferrari 4.5L V8	60
13	GT	44	(United States) Magnus Racing	(United States) Andy Lally (United States) John Potter	Porsche 911 GT3 Cup	60
13	GT	44	(United States) Magnus Racing	(United States) Andy Lally (United States) John Potter	Porsche 4.0L F6	60
14	GT	31	(United States) Marsh Racing	(United States) Eric Curran (United States) Boris Said	Chevrolet Corvette	60
14	GT	31	(United States) Marsh Racing	(United States) Eric Curran (United States) Boris Said	Chevrolet 6.2L V8	60
15	GT	73	(United States) Park Place Motorsports	(United States) Patrick Lindsey (United States) Patrick Long	Porsche 911 GT3 Cup	60
15	GT	73	(United States) Park Place Motorsports	(United States) Patrick Lindsey (United States) Patrick Long	Porsche 4.0L F6	60
16	GT	69	(United States) AIM Autosport Team FXDD with Ferrari	(United States) Emil Assentato (United States) Anthony Lazzaro	Ferrari 458 Italia Grand-Am	60
16	GT	69	(United States) AIM Autosport Team FXDD with Ferrari	(United States) Emil Assentato (United States) Anthony Lazzaro	Ferrari 4.5L V8	60
17	GT	93	(United States) Turner Motorsport	(United States) Michael Marsal (Canada) Gunter Schaldach (United States) Billy Johnson	BMW M3	59
17	GT	93	(United States) Turner Motorsport	(United States) Michael Marsal (Canada) Gunter Schaldach (United States) Billy Johnson	BMW 5.0L V8	59
18	GT	18	(Belgium) Mühlner Motorsports America	(United States) Tomy Drissi (South Africa) Dion von Moltke	Porsche 911 GT3 Cup	58
18	GT	18	(Belgium) Mühlner Motorsports America	(United States) Tomy Drissi (South Africa) Dion von Moltke	Porsche 4.0L F6	58
19	**GX**	**00**	**(United States) Visit Florida Racing/Speedsource**	**(United States) Joel Miller** **(United States) Tristan Nunez**	**Mazda6 GX**	**57**
19	**GX**	**00**	**(United States) Visit Florida Racing/Speedsource**	**(United States) Joel Miller** **(United States) Tristan Nunez**	**Mazda 2.2L I4 Diesel**	**57**
20	GX	38	(United States) BGB Motorsports	(United States) Jim Norman (United States) Spencer Pumpelly	Porsche Cayman GX.R	56
20	GX	38	(United States) BGB Motorsports	(United States) Jim Norman (United States) Spencer Pumpelly	Porsche 3.8L F6	56
21 DNF	GX	70	(United States) Mazdaspeed/Speedsource	(United States) Tom Long (Canada) Sylvain Tremblay	Mazda6 GX	47
21 DNF	GX	70	(United States) Mazdaspeed/Speedsource	(United States) Tom Long (Canada) Sylvain Tremblay	Mazda 2.2L I4 Diesel	47
22 DNF	DP	3	(United States) 8 Star Motorsports	(Venezuela) Enzo Potolicchio (France) Stéphane Sarrazin (Portugal) Pedro Lamy	Corvette DP (Coyote)	46
22 DNF	DP	3	(United States) 8 Star Motorsports	(Venezuela) Enzo Potolicchio (France) Stéphane Sarrazin (Portugal) Pedro Lamy	Chevrolet 5.0L V8	46
23	DP	9	(United States) Action Express Racing	(United States) Brian Frisselle (United States) Burt Frisselle	Corvette DP (Coyote)	43
23	DP	9	(United States) Action Express Racing	(United States) Brian Frisselle (United States) Burt Frisselle	Chevrolet 5.0L V8	43
24 DNF	GT	94	(United States) Turner Motorsport	(United States) Billy Johnson (Canada) Paul Dalla Lana (United States) Bill Auberlen	BMW M3	32
24 DNF	GT	94	(United States) Turner Motorsport	(United States) Billy Johnson (Canada) Paul Dalla Lana (United States) Bill Auberlen	BMW 5.0L V8	32
25 DNF	DP	01	(United States) Chip Ganassi Racing with Felix Sabates	(United States) Scott Pruett (Mexico) Memo Rojas	Riley Mk. XXVI	0
25 DNF	DP	01	(United States) Chip Ganassi Racing with Felix Sabates	(United States) Scott Pruett (Mexico) Memo Rojas	BMW 5.0L V8	0
26 DNF	DP	60	(United States) Michael Shank Racing	(Canada) Michael Valiante (United States) John Pew	Riley Mk. XXVI	0
26 DNF	DP	60	(United States) Michael Shank Racing	(Canada) Michael Valiante (United States) John Pew	Ford 5.0L V8	0

Preceded by 2013 Visual Studio Ultimate Grand Prix of Atlanta	Rolex Sports Car Series; 2013	Succeeded by 2013 Diamond Cellar Classic
