= 2013 6 Hours of The Glen =

Track map of Watkins Glen International

The 2013 Sahlen's Six Hours of the Glen was the seventh race of 2013 Rolex Sports Car Series season. It took place at Watkins Glen International on June 30, 2013.

== Entry list ==
Entry List
| No. | Team | Car | Driver 1 | Driver 2 | Driver 3 | Driver 4 |
DP
| 01 | Chip Ganassi Racing with Felix Sabates | Riley-BMW | (United States) Scott Pruett | (Mexico) Memo Rojas | | |
| 2 | Starworks Motorsport | Riley-Ford | (United Kingdom) Ryan Dalziel | (Venezuela) Alex Popow | (France) Sébastien Bourdais | |
| 3 | 8Star Motorsports | Corvette DP | (Venezuela) Enzo Potolicchio | (Canada) Michael Valiante | (France) Stéphane Sarrazin | |
| 4 | 8Star Motorsports | Corvette DP | (Mexico) Luis Diaz | (Venezuela) Emilio DiGuida | (France) Stéphane Sarrazin | |
| 5 | Action Express Racing | Corvette DP | (Brazil) Christian Fittipaldi | (Portugal) João Barbosa | | |
| 6 | Michael Shank Racing | Riley-Ford | (Colombia) Gustavo Yacamán | (United Kingdom) Justin Wilson | | |
| 8 | Starworks Motorsport | Riley-Ford | (United States) Scott Mayer | (New Zealand) Brendon Hartley | (Germany) Pierre Kaffer | |
| 9 | Action Express Racing | Corvette DP | (United States) Brian Frisselle | (United States) Burt Frisselle | | |
| 10 | Wayne Taylor Racing | Corvette DP | (Italy) Max Angelelli | (United States) Jordan Taylor | | |
| 42 | Team Sahlen | Riley-BMW | (United States) Dane Cameron | (United States) Wayne Nonnamaker | (Canada) Mark Wilkins | |
| 43 | Team Sahlen | Riley-BMW | (United States) Joe Nonnamaker | (United States) Will Nonnamaker | (United States) Joe Sahlen | (Canada) Mark Wilkins |
| 60 | Michael Shank Racing | Riley-Ford | (Brazil) Oswaldo Negri Jr. | (United States) John Pew | | |
| 90 | Spirit of Daytona Racing | Corvette DP | (United States) Ricky Taylor | (United Kingdom) Richard Westbrook | (Spain) Antonio García | |
| 99 | GAINSCO/Bob Stallings Racing | Corvette DP | (United States) Jon Fogarty | (United States) Alex Gurney | | |
GT
| 03 | Extreme Speed Motorsports | Ferrari 458 Italia Grand-Am | (United States) Mike Hedlund | (United States) Johannes van Overbeek | (United States) Guy Cosmo | |
| 18 | Mühlner Motorsports America | Porsche 911 GT3 Cup | (Chile) Eduardo Costabal | (Chile) Eliseo Salazar | | |
| 24 | Audi Sport Customer Racing | Audi R8 Grand-Am | (Portugal) Filipe Albuquerque | (Italy) Edoardo Mortara | (South Africa) Dion von Moltke | |
| 31 | Marsh Racing | Chevrolet Corvette | (United States) Eric Curran | (United States) Boris Said | | |
| 44 | Magnus Racing | Porsche 911 GT3 Cup | (United States) John Potter | (United States) Andy Lally | (Austria) Richard Lietz | |
| 46 | Fall-Line Motorsports | Audi R8 Grand-Am | (United States) Al Carter | (United States) Charles Espenlaub | (United States) Charles Putman | |
| 56 | AF - Waltrip | Ferrari 458 Italia Grand-Am | (Portugal) Rui Águas | (United States) Robert Kauffman | | |
| 57 | Stevenson Motorsports | Chevrolet Camaro GT.R | (United States) John Edwards | (Scotland) Robin Liddell | | |
| 61 | R.Ferri/AIM Motorsport Racing with Ferrari | Ferrari 458 Italia Grand-Am | (Italy) Max Papis | (United States) Jeff Segal | (Finland) Toni Vilander | |
| 62 | Snow Racing/Wright Motorsports | Porsche 911 GT3 Cup | (United States) Andrew Davis | (United States) Madison Snow | (Belgium) Jan Heylen | |
| 63 | Scuderia Corsa Michelotto | Ferrari 458 Italia Grand-Am | (Italy) Alessandro Balzan | (United States) Jeff Westphal | (United States) Craig Stanton | |
| 69 | AIM Autosport Team FXDD with Ferrari | Ferrari 458 Italia Grand-Am | (United States) Emil Assentato | (United States) Anthony Lazzaro | (United States) Leh Keen | |
| 73 | Park Place Motorsports | Porsche 911 GT3 Cup | (United States) Patrick Lindsey | (United States) Patrick Long | (United States) Bryan Sellers | |
| 80 | TruSpeed Motorsports | Porsche 911 GT3 Cup | (United States) Kelly Collins | (United States) Tom Haacker | (United States) Bryce Miller | |
| 93 | Turner Motorsports | BMW M3 | (United States) Michael Marsal | (United States) Bill Auberlen | (Canada) Gunter Schaldach | (Portugal) Pedro Lamy |
| 94 | Turner Motorsports | BMW M3 | (Canada) Paul Dalla Lana | (United States) Bill Auberlen | (United States) Billy Johnson | |
GX
| 00 | Visit Florida Racing/Speedsource | Mazda6 GX | (United States) Joel Miller | (United States) Tristan Nunez | (Japan) Yojiro Terada | |
| 38 | BGB Motorsports | Porsche Cayman GX.R | (United States) Jim Norman | (United States) Spencer Pumpelly | | |
| 70 | Mazdaspeed/Speedsource | Mazda6 GX | (United States) Tom Long | (Canada) Sylvain Tremblay | (United States) Andrew Carbonell | |

== Qualifying ==
Qualifying for the DP class was canceled due to weather. The grid was set using championship points with Max Angelelli and Jordan Taylor taking pole position.

=== Qualifying Results ===
Pole positions in each class are denoted in bold.

| Pos | Class | No. | Team | Car | Qualifying | Grid |
|---|---|---|---|---|---|---|
| 1 | **GT** | **57** | **Stevenson Motorsports** | **Chevrolet Camaro GT.R** | **1:52.583** | **15** |
| 2 | GT | 31 | Marsh Racing | Chevrolet Corvette | 1:52.751 | 16 |
| 3 | GT | 61 | R. Ferri/AIM Motorsport Racing with Ferrari | Ferrari 458 Italia Grand-Am | 1:52.800 | 17 |
| 4 | GT | 24 | Audi Sport Customer Racing | Audi R8 Grand-Am | 1:53.235 | 18 |
| 5 | GT | 94 | Turner Motorsport | BMW M3 | 1:53.242 | 30 |
| 6 | GT | 63 | Scuderia Corsa Michelotto | Ferrari 458 Italia Grand-Am | 1:53.533 | 19 |
| 7 | GT | 62 | Snow Racing/Wright Motorsports | Porsche 911 GT3 Cup | 1:53.579 | 20 |
| 8 | GT | 73 | Park Place Motorsports | Porsche 911 GT3 Cup | 1:53.875 | 21 |
| 9 | GT | 69 | AIM Autosport Team FXDD with Ferrari | Ferrari 458 Italia Grand-Am | 1:54.060 | 22 |
| 10 | GT | 93 | Turner Motorsport | BMW M3 | 1:54.209 | 23 |
| 11 | GT | 44 | Magnus Racing | Porsche 911 GT3 Cup | 1:55.182 | 24 |
| 12 | GT | 46 | Fall-Line Motorsports | Audi R8 Grand-Am | 1:56.121 | 25 |
| 13 | GT | 03 | Extreme Speed Motorsports | Ferrari 458 Italia Grand-Am | 1:57.879 | 26 |
| 14 | GT | 18 | Mühlner Motorsports America | Porsche 911 GT3 Cup | 1:58.252 | 27 |
| 15 | **GX** | **70** | **Mazdaspeed/Speedsource** | **Mazda6 GX** | **1:58.478** | **31** |
| 16 | GT | 56 | AF - Waltrip | Ferrari 458 Italia Grand-Am | 1:58.716 | 28 |
| 17 | GX | 38 | BGB Motorsports | Porsche Cayman GX.R | 1:59.637 | 32 |
| 18 | GT | 80 | TruSpeed Motorsports | Porsche 911 GT3 Cup | 2:03.962 | 29 |
| 19 | GX | 00 | Visit Florida Racing/Speedsource | Mazda6 GX | 2:18.326 | 33 |
| 20 | DP | 01 | Chip Ganassi Racing with Felix Sabates | Riley / BMW | No time | 6 |
| 21 | **DP** | **10** | **Wayne Taylor Racing** | **Corvette DP** | **No time** | **1** |
| 22 | DP | 2 | Starworks Motorsport | Riley / Ford | No time | 3 |
| 23 | DP | 3 | 8 Star Motorsports | Corvette DP | No time | 11 |
| 24 | DP | 4 | 8 Star Motorsports | Corvette DP | No time | 14 |
| 25 | DP | 42 | Team Sahlen | Riley / BMW | No time | 7 |
| 26 | DP | 43 | Team Sahlen | Riley / BMW | No time | 12 |
| 27 | DP | 5 | Action Express Racing | Corvette DP | No time | 4 |
| 28 | DP | 6 | Michael Shank Racing | Riley / Ford | No time | 9 |
| 29 | DP | 60 | Michael Shank Racing | Riley / Ford | No time | 13 |
| 30 | DP | 9 | Action Express Racing | Corvette DP | No time | 8 |
| 31 | DP | 90 | Spirit of Daytona Racing | Corvette DP | No time | 5 |
| 32 | DP | 8 | Starworks Motorsport | Riley / Ford | No time | 10 |
| 33 | DP | 99 | GAINSCO/Bob Stallings Racing | Corvette DP | No time | 2 |

== Race ==
=== Race results ===
Winners in each class are denoted in bold.

| Pos. | Class | No. | Team | Drivers | Chassis | Laps |
| Pos. | Class | No. | Team | Drivers | Engine | Laps |
|---|---|---|---|---|---|---|
| 1 | **DP** | **5** | **(United States) Action Express Racing** | **(Brazil) Christian Fittipaldi** **(Portugal) João Barbosa** | **Corvette DP (Coyote)** | **171** |
| 1 | **DP** | **5** | **(United States) Action Express Racing** | **(Brazil) Christian Fittipaldi** **(Portugal) João Barbosa** | **Chevrolet 5.0L V8** | **171** |
| 2 | DP | 3 | (United States) 8 Star Motorsports | (Venezuela) Enzo Potolicchio (Canada) Michael Valiante (France) Stéphane Sarrazin | Corvette DP (Coyote) | 171 |
| 2 | DP | 3 | (United States) 8 Star Motorsports | (Venezuela) Enzo Potolicchio (Canada) Michael Valiante (France) Stéphane Sarrazin | Chevrolet 5.0L V8 | 171 |
| 3 | DP | 8 | (United States) Starworks Motorsport | (New Zealand) Brendon Hartley (United States) Scott Mayer (Germany) Pierre Kaffer | Riley Mk. XXVI | 171 |
| 3 | DP | 8 | (United States) Starworks Motorsport | (New Zealand) Brendon Hartley (United States) Scott Mayer (Germany) Pierre Kaffer | Ford 5.0L V8 | 171 |
| 4 | DP | 60 | (United States) Michael Shank Racing | (Brazil) Oswaldo Negri Jr. (United States) John Pew | Riley Mk. XXVI | 171 |
| 4 | DP | 60 | (United States) Michael Shank Racing | (Brazil) Oswaldo Negri Jr. (United States) John Pew | Ford 5.0L V8 | 171 |
| 5 | DP | 9 | (United States) Action Express Racing | (United States) Brian Frisselle (United States) Burt Frisselle | Corvette DP (Coyote) | 171 |
| 5 | DP | 9 | (United States) Action Express Racing | (United States) Brian Frisselle (United States) Burt Frisselle | Chevrolet 5.0L V8 | 171 |
| 6 | DP | 6 | (United States) Michael Shank Racing | (United Kingdom) Justin Wilson (Colombia) Gustavo Yacamán | Riley Mk. XXVI | 171 |
| 6 | DP | 6 | (United States) Michael Shank Racing | (United Kingdom) Justin Wilson (Colombia) Gustavo Yacamán | Ford 5.0L V8 | 171 |
| 7 | DP | 01 | (United States) Chip Ganassi Racing with Felix Sabates | (United States) Scott Pruett (Mexico) Memo Rojas | Riley Mk. XXVI | 171 |
| 7 | DP | 01 | (United States) Chip Ganassi Racing with Felix Sabates | (United States) Scott Pruett (Mexico) Memo Rojas | BMW 5.0L V8 | 171 |
| 8 | DP | 2 | (United States) Starworks Motorsport | (Scotland) Ryan Dalziel (Venezuela) Alex Popow (France) Sébastien Bourdais | Riley Mk. XXVI | 171 |
| 8 | DP | 2 | (United States) Starworks Motorsport | (Scotland) Ryan Dalziel (Venezuela) Alex Popow (France) Sébastien Bourdais | Ford 5.0L V8 | 171 |
| 9 | DP | 90 | (United States) Spirit of Daytona Racing | (United States) Ricky Taylor (United Kingdom) Richard Westbrook (Spain) Antonio García | Corvette DP (Coyote) | 171 |
| 9 | DP | 90 | (United States) Spirit of Daytona Racing | (United States) Ricky Taylor (United Kingdom) Richard Westbrook (Spain) Antonio García | Chevrolet 5.0L V8 | 171 |
| 10 | DP | 10 | (United States) Wayne Taylor Racing | (Italy) Max Angelelli (United States) Jordan Taylor | Corvette DP (Dallara) | 170 |
| 10 | DP | 10 | (United States) Wayne Taylor Racing | (Italy) Max Angelelli (United States) Jordan Taylor | Chevrolet 5.0L V8 | 170 |
| 11 | DP | 4 | (United States) 8 Star Motorsports | (Mexico) Luis Diaz (Venezuela) Emilio DiGuida (France) Stéphane Sarrazin | Corvette DP (Coyote) | 169 |
| 11 | DP | 4 | (United States) 8 Star Motorsports | (Mexico) Luis Diaz (Venezuela) Emilio DiGuida (France) Stéphane Sarrazin | Chevrolet 5.0L V8 | 169 |
| 12 | DP | 42 | (United States) Team Sahlen | (United States) Dane Cameron (United States) Wayne Nonnamaker (Canada) Mark Wilkins | Riley Mk. XXVI | 168 |
| 12 | DP | 42 | (United States) Team Sahlen | (United States) Dane Cameron (United States) Wayne Nonnamaker (Canada) Mark Wilkins | BMW 5.0L V8 | 168 |
| 13 | **GT** | **57** | **(United States) Stevenson Motorsports** | **(United States) John Edwards** **(Scotland) Robin Liddell** | **Chevrolet Camaro GT.R** | **164** |
| 13 | **GT** | **57** | **(United States) Stevenson Motorsports** | **(United States) John Edwards** **(Scotland) Robin Liddell** | **Chevrolet 6.2L V8** | **164** |
| 14 | GT | 69 | (United States) AIM Autosport Team FXDD with Ferrari | (United States) Emil Assentato (United States) Anthony Lazzaro (United States) Leh Keen | Ferrari 458 Italia Grand-Am | 164 |
| 14 | GT | 69 | (United States) AIM Autosport Team FXDD with Ferrari | (United States) Emil Assentato (United States) Anthony Lazzaro (United States) Leh Keen | Ferrari 4.5L V8 | 164 |
| 15 | DP | 43 | (United States) Team Sahlen | (United States) Joe Nonnamaker (United States) Will Nonnamaker (United States) Joe Sahlen (Canada) Mark Wilkins | Riley Mk. XXVI | 164 |
| 15 | DP | 43 | (United States) Team Sahlen | (United States) Joe Nonnamaker (United States) Will Nonnamaker (United States) Joe Sahlen (Canada) Mark Wilkins | BMW 5.0L V8 | 164 |
| 16 | GT | 44 | (United States) Magnus Racing | (United States) Andy Lally (United States) John Potter (Austria) Richard Lietz | Porsche 911 GT3 Cup | 164 |
| 16 | GT | 44 | (United States) Magnus Racing | (United States) Andy Lally (United States) John Potter (Austria) Richard Lietz | Porsche 4.0L F6 | 164 |
| 17 | GT | 94 | (United States) Turner Motorsport | (Canada) Paul Dalla Lana (United States) Bill Auberlen (United States) Billy Johnson | BMW M3 | 164 |
| 17 | GT | 94 | (United States) Turner Motorsport | (Canada) Paul Dalla Lana (United States) Bill Auberlen (United States) Billy Johnson | BMW 5.0L V8 | 164 |
| 18 | GT | 63 | (United States) Scuderia Corsa Michelotto | (Italy) Alessandro Balzan (United States) Jeff Westphal (United States) Craig Stanton | Ferrari 458 Italia Grand-Am | 164 |
| 18 | GT | 63 | (United States) Scuderia Corsa Michelotto | (Italy) Alessandro Balzan (United States) Jeff Westphal (United States) Craig Stanton | Ferrari 4.5L V8 | 164 |
| 19 | GT | 03 | (United States) Extreme Speed Motorsports | (United States) Mike Hedlund (United States) Johannes van Overbeek (United States) Guy Cosmo | Ferrari 458 Italia Grand-Am | 163 |
| 19 | GT | 03 | (United States) Extreme Speed Motorsports | (United States) Mike Hedlund (United States) Johannes van Overbeek (United States) Guy Cosmo | Ferrari 4.5L V8 | 163 |
| 20 | GT | 31 | (United States) Marsh Racing | (United States) Eric Curran (United States) Boris Said | Chevrolet Corvette | 163 |
| 20 | GT | 31 | (United States) Marsh Racing | (United States) Eric Curran (United States) Boris Said | Chevrolet 6.2L V8 | 163 |
| 21 | GT | 73 | (United States) Park Place Motorsports | (United States) Patrick Lindsey (United States) Patrick Long (United States) Bryan Sellers | Porsche 911 GT3 Cup | 163 |
| 21 | GT | 73 | (United States) Park Place Motorsports | (United States) Patrick Lindsey (United States) Patrick Long (United States) Bryan Sellers | Porsche 4.0L F6 | 163 |
| 22 | GT | 24 | (United States) Audi Sport Customer Racing | (Portugal) Filipe Albuquerque (Italy) Edoardo Mortara (South Africa) Dion von Moltke | Audi R8 Grand-Am | 162 |
| 22 | GT | 24 | (United States) Audi Sport Customer Racing | (Portugal) Filipe Albuquerque (Italy) Edoardo Mortara (South Africa) Dion von Moltke | Audi 5.2L V10 | 162 |
| 23 | GT | 56 | (United States) AF - Waltrip | (Portugal) Rui Águas (United States) Robert Kauffman | Ferrari 458 Italia Grand-Am | 162 |
| 23 | GT | 56 | (United States) AF - Waltrip | (Portugal) Rui Águas (United States) Robert Kauffman | Ferrari 4.5L V8 | 162 |
| 24 | GT | 61 | (United States) R. Ferri/AIM Motorsport Racing with Ferrari | (Italy) Max Papis (United States) Jeff Segal (Finland) Toni Vilander | Ferrari 458 Italia Grand-Am | 162 |
| 24 | GT | 61 | (United States) R. Ferri/AIM Motorsport Racing with Ferrari | (Italy) Max Papis (United States) Jeff Segal (Finland) Toni Vilander | Ferrari 4.5L V8 | 162 |
| 25 | GT | 80 | (United States) TruSpeed Motorsports | (United States) Kelly Collins (United States) Tom Haacker (United States) Bryce Miller | Porsche 911 GT3 Cup | 161 |
| 25 | GT | 80 | (United States) TruSpeed Motorsports | (United States) Kelly Collins (United States) Tom Haacker (United States) Bryce Miller | Porsche 4.0L F6 | 161 |
| 26 | GT | 93 | (United States) Turner Motorsport | (United States) Michael Marsal (United States) Bill Auberlen (Canada) Gunter Schaldach (Portugal) Pedro Lamy | BMW M3 | 161 |
| 26 | GT | 93 | (United States) Turner Motorsport | (United States) Michael Marsal (United States) Bill Auberlen (Canada) Gunter Schaldach (Portugal) Pedro Lamy | BMW 5.0L V8 | 161 |
| 27 | GT | 46 | (United States) Fall-Line Motorsports | (United States) Al Carter (United States) Charles Espenlaub (United States) Charles Putman | Audi R8 Grand-Am | 160 |
| 27 | GT | 46 | (United States) Fall-Line Motorsports | (United States) Al Carter (United States) Charles Espenlaub (United States) Charles Putman | Audi 5.2L V10 | 160 |
| 28 | DP | 99 | (United States) GAINSCO/Bob Stallings Racing | (United States) Jon Fogarty (United States) Alex Gurney | Corvette DP (Riley XXVI) | 159 |
| 28 | DP | 99 | (United States) GAINSCO/Bob Stallings Racing | (United States) Jon Fogarty (United States) Alex Gurney | Chevrolet 5.0L V8 | 159 |
| 29 | **GX** | **00** | **(United States) Visit Florida Racing/Speedsource** | **(United States) Joel Miller** **(United States) Tristan Nunez** **(Japan) Yojiro Terada** | **Mazda6 GX** | **149** |
| 29 | **GX** | **00** | **(United States) Visit Florida Racing/Speedsource** | **(United States) Joel Miller** **(United States) Tristan Nunez** **(Japan) Yojiro Terada** | **Mazda 2.2L I4 Diesel** | **149** |
| 30 | GT | 18 | (Belgium) Mühlner Motorsports America | (Chile) Eduardo Costabal (Chile) Eliseo Salazar | Porsche 911 GT3 Cup | 145 |
| 30 | GT | 18 | (Belgium) Mühlner Motorsports America | (Chile) Eduardo Costabal (Chile) Eliseo Salazar | Porsche 4.0L F6 | 145 |
| 31 DNF | GX | 38 | (United States) BGB Motorsports | (United States) Jim Norman (United States) Spencer Pumpelly | Porsche Cayman GX.R | 87 |
| 31 DNF | GX | 38 | (United States) BGB Motorsports | (United States) Jim Norman (United States) Spencer Pumpelly | Porsche 3.8L F6 | 87 |
| 32 DNF | GX | 70 | (United States) Mazdaspeed/Speedsource | (United States) Tom Long (Canada) Sylvain Tremblay (United States) Andrew Carbonell | Mazda6 GX | 58 |
| 32 DNF | GX | 70 | (United States) Mazdaspeed/Speedsource | (United States) Tom Long (Canada) Sylvain Tremblay (United States) Andrew Carbonell | Mazda 2.2L I4 Diesel | 58 |
| 33 DNF | GT | 62 | (United States) Snow Racing/Wright Motorsports | (United States) Andrew Davis (United States) Madison Snow (Belgium) Jan Heylen | Porsche 911 GT3 Cup | 3 |
| 33 DNF | GT | 62 | (United States) Snow Racing/Wright Motorsports | (United States) Andrew Davis (United States) Madison Snow (Belgium) Jan Heylen | Porsche 4.0L F6 | 3 |

| Preceded by 2013 Diamond Cellar Classic | Rolex Sports Car Series; 2013 | Succeeded by 2013 Brickyard Grand Prix |
