= 2013 Diamond Cellar Classic =

Track map of Mid-Ohio Sports Car Course

The 2013 Diamond Cellar Classic was the sixth race of 2013 Rolex Sports Car Series season. It took place at Mid-Ohio Sports Car Course on June 15, 2013.

== Entry list ==
Entry List
| No. | Team | Car | Driver 1 | Driver 2 | Driver 3 |
DP
| 01 | Chip Ganassi Racing with Felix Sabates | Riley-BMW | (United States) Scott Pruett | (Mexico) Memo Rojas | |
| 2 | Starworks Motorsport | Riley-Ford | (United Kingdom) Ryan Dalziel | (Venezuela) Alex Popow | |
| 3 | 8Star Motorsports | Corvette DP | (Venezuela) Enzo Potolicchio | (Canada) Michael Valiante | |
| 5 | Action Express Racing | Corvette DP | (Brazil) Christian Fittipaldi | (Portugal) João Barbosa | |
| 6 | Michael Shank Racing | Riley-Ford | (Colombia) Gustavo Yacamán | (Brazil) Antônio Pizzonia | |
| 8 | Starworks Motorsport | Riley-Ford | (United States) Scott Mayer | (New Zealand) Brendon Hartley | |
| 9 | Action Express Racing | Corvette DP | (United States) Brian Frisselle | (United States) Burt Frisselle | |
| 10 | Wayne Taylor Racing | Corvette DP | (Italy) Max Angelelli | (United States) Jordan Taylor | |
| 42 | Team Sahlen | Riley-BMW | (United States) Dane Cameron | (United States) Wayne Nonnamaker | |
| 43 | Team Sahlen | Riley-BMW | (United States) Joe Nonnamaker | (United States) Will Nonnamaker | (United States) Joe Sahlen |
| 60 | Michael Shank Racing | Riley-Ford | (Brazil) Oswaldo Negri Jr. | (United States) John Pew | |
| 90 | Spirit of Daytona Racing | Corvette DP | (United States) Ricky Taylor | (United Kingdom) Richard Westbrook | |
| 99 | GAINSCO/Bob Stallings Racing | Corvette DP | (United States) Jon Fogarty | (United States) Alex Gurney | |
GT
| 18 | Mühlner Motorsports America | Porsche 911 GT3 Cup | (United States) Leh Keen | (South Africa) Dion von Moltke | |
| 31 | Marsh Racing | Chevrolet Corvette | (United States) Eric Curran | (United States) Boris Said | |
| 44 | Magnus Racing | Porsche 911 GT3 Cup | (United States) John Potter | (United States) Andy Lally | |
| 57 | Stevenson Motorsports | Chevrolet Camaro GT.R | (United States) John Edwards | (Scotland) Robin Liddell | |
| 61 | R.Ferri/AIM Motorsport Racing with Ferrari | Ferrari 458 Italia Grand-Am | (Italy) Max Papis | (United States) Jeff Segal | |
| 62 | Snow Racing/Wright Motorsports | Porsche 911 GT3 Cup | (United States) Andrew Davis | (United States) Madison Snow | |
| 63 | Scuderia Corsa Michelotto | Ferrari 458 Italia Grand-Am | (Italy) Alessandro Balzan | (United States) Jeff Westphal | |
| 69 | AIM Autosport Team FXDD with Ferrari | Ferrari 458 Italia Grand-Am | (United States) Emil Assentato | (United States) Anthony Lazzaro | |
| 73 | Park Place Motorsports | Porsche 911 GT3 Cup | (United States) Patrick Lindsey | (United States) Patrick Long | |
| 93 | Turner Motorsports | BMW M3 | (United States) Michael Marsal | (United States) Billy Johnson | |
| 94 | Turner Motorsports | BMW M3 | (Canada) Paul Dalla Lana | (United States) Bill Auberlen | |
GX
| 00 | Visit Florida Racing/Speedsource | Mazda6 GX | (United States) Joel Miller | (United States) Tristan Nunez | |
| 38 | BGB Motorsports | Porsche Cayman GX.R | (United States) Jim Norman | (United States) Spencer Pumpelly | |
| 70 | Mazdaspeed/Speedsource | Mazda6 GX | (United States) Tom Long | (Canada) Sylvain Tremblay | |

== Qualifying ==
=== Qualifying Results ===
Pole positions in each class are denoted in bold.

| Pos | Class | No. | Team | Car | Qualifying | Grid |
|---|---|---|---|---|---|---|
| 1 | DP | 10 | Wayne Taylor Racing | Corvette DP | 1:16.947 | 1 |
| 2 | DP | 90 | Spirit of Daytona Racing | Corvette DP | 1:17.001 | 2 |
| 3 | DP | 5 | Action Express Racing | Corvette DP | 1:17.200 | 3 |
| 4 | DP | 99 | GAINSCO/Bob Stallings Racing | Corvette DP | 1:17.248 | 4 |
| 5 | DP | 9 | Action Express Racing | Corvette DP | 1:17.381 | 5 |
| 6 | DP | 2 | Starworks Motorsport | Riley / Ford | 1:17.415 | 6 |
| 7 | DP | 01 | Chip Ganassi Racing with Felix Sabates | Riley / BMW | 1:17.755 | 7 |
| 8 | DP | 6 | Michael Shank Racing | Riley / Ford | 1:17.822 | 8 |
| 9 | DP | 60 | Michael Shank Racing | Riley / Ford | 1:17.839 | 9 |
| 10 | DP | 42 | Team Sahlen | Riley / BMW | 1:18.890 | 10 |
| 11 | DP | 3 | 8 Star Motorsports | Corvette DP | 1:19.746 | 11 |
| 12 | DP | 43 | Team Sahlen | Riley / BMW | 1:21.839 | 12 |
| 13 | GT | 57 | Stevenson Motorsports | Chevrolet Camaro GT.R | 1:22.957 | 14 |
| 14 | GT | 31 | Marsh Racing | Chevrolet Corvette | 1:23.245 | 15 |
| 15 | GT | 69 | AIM Autosport Team FXDD with Ferrari | Ferrari 458 Italia Grand-Am | 1:23.509 | 16 |
| 16 | GT | 61 | R. Ferri/AIM Motorsport Racing with Ferrari | Ferrari 458 Italia Grand-Am | 1:23.723 | 17 |
| 17 | GT | 63 | Scuderia Corsa Michelotto | Ferrari 458 Italia Grand-Am | 1:23.802 | 18 |
| 18 | GT | 94 | Turner Motorsport | BMW M3 | 1:24.314 | 19 |
| 19 | GT | 73 | Park Place Motorsports | Porsche 911 GT3 Cup | 1:24.356 | 20 |
| 20 | GT | 93 | Turner Motorsport | BMW M3 | 1:24.409 | 21 |
| 21 | GT | 18 | Mühlner Motorsports America | Porsche 911 GT3 Cup | 1:24.652 | 22 |
| 22 | GT | 62 | Snow Racing/Wright Motorsports | Porsche 911 GT3 Cup | 1:24.933 | 23 |
| 23 | GT | 44 | Magnus Racing | Porsche 911 GT3 Cup | 1:24.987 | 24 |
| 24 | GX | 70 | Mazdaspeed/Speedsource | Mazda6 GX | 1:27.790 | 25 |
| 25 | GX | 00 | Visit Florida Racing/Speedsource | Mazda6 GX | 1:28.444 | 26 |
| 26 | GX | 38 | BGB Motorsports | Porsche Cayman GX.R | 1:30.927 | 27 |
| 27 | DP | 8 | Starworks Motorsport | Riley / Ford | No time | 13 |

== Race ==
=== Race results ===
Winners in each class are denoted in bold.

| Pos. | Class | No. | Team | Drivers | Chassis | Laps |
| Pos. | Class | No. | Team | Drivers | Engine | Laps |
|---|---|---|---|---|---|---|
| 1 | **DP** | **5** | **(United States) Action Express Racing** | **(Brazil) Christian Fittipaldi** **(Portugal) João Barbosa** | **Corvette DP (Coyote)** | **110** |
| 1 | **DP** | **5** | **(United States) Action Express Racing** | **(Brazil) Christian Fittipaldi** **(Portugal) João Barbosa** | **Chevrolet 5.0L V8** | **110** |
| 2 | DP | 3 | (United States) 8 Star Motorsports | (Venezuela) Enzo Potolicchio (Canada) Michael Valiante | Corvette DP (Coyote) | 110 |
| 2 | DP | 3 | (United States) 8 Star Motorsports | (Venezuela) Enzo Potolicchio (Canada) Michael Valiante | Chevrolet 5.0L V8 | 110 |
| 3 | DP | 2 | (United States) Starworks Motorsport | (Scotland) Ryan Dalziel (Venezuela) Alex Popow | Riley Mk. XXVI | 110 |
| 3 | DP | 2 | (United States) Starworks Motorsport | (Scotland) Ryan Dalziel (Venezuela) Alex Popow | Ford 5.0L V8 | 110 |
| 4 | DP | 60 | (United States) Michael Shank Racing | (Brazil) Oswaldo Negri Jr. (United States) John Pew | Riley Mk. XXVI | 110 |
| 4 | DP | 60 | (United States) Michael Shank Racing | (Brazil) Oswaldo Negri Jr. (United States) John Pew | Ford 5.0L V8 | 110 |
| 5 | DP | 99 | (United States) GAINSCO/Bob Stallings Racing | (United States) Jon Fogarty (United States) Alex Gurney | Corvette DP (Riley XXVI) | 110 |
| 5 | DP | 99 | (United States) GAINSCO/Bob Stallings Racing | (United States) Jon Fogarty (United States) Alex Gurney | Chevrolet 5.0L V8 | 110 |
| 6 | DP | 10 | (United States) Wayne Taylor Racing | (Italy) Max Angelelli (United States) Jordan Taylor | Corvette DP (Dallara) | 110 |
| 6 | DP | 10 | (United States) Wayne Taylor Racing | (Italy) Max Angelelli (United States) Jordan Taylor | Chevrolet 5.0L V8 | 110 |
| 7 | DP | 9 | (United States) Action Express Racing | (United States) Brian Frisselle (United States) Burt Frisselle | Corvette DP (Coyote) | 110 |
| 7 | DP | 9 | (United States) Action Express Racing | (United States) Brian Frisselle (United States) Burt Frisselle | Chevrolet 5.0L V8 | 110 |
| 8 | DP | 42 | (United States) Team Sahlen | (United States) Dane Cameron (United States) Wayne Nonnamaker | Riley Mk. XXVI | 109 |
| 8 | DP | 42 | (United States) Team Sahlen | (United States) Dane Cameron (United States) Wayne Nonnamaker | BMW 5.0L V8 | 109 |
| 9 | DP | 90 | (United States) Spirit of Daytona Racing | (United States) Ricky Taylor (United Kingdom) Richard Westbrook | Corvette DP (Coyote) | 109 |
| 9 | DP | 90 | (United States) Spirit of Daytona Racing | (United States) Ricky Taylor (United Kingdom) Richard Westbrook | Chevrolet 5.0L V8 | 109 |
| 10 | DP | 8 | (United States) Starworks Motorsport | (New Zealand) Brendon Hartley (United States) Scott Mayer | Riley Mk. XXVI | 109 |
| 10 | DP | 8 | (United States) Starworks Motorsport | (New Zealand) Brendon Hartley (United States) Scott Mayer | Ford 5.0L V8 | 109 |
| 11 | **GT** | **94** | **(United States) Turner Motorsport** | **(Canada) Paul Dalla Lana** **(United States) Bill Auberlen** | **BMW M3** | **105** |
| 11 | **GT** | **94** | **(United States) Turner Motorsport** | **(Canada) Paul Dalla Lana** **(United States) Bill Auberlen** | **BMW 5.0L V8** | **105** |
| 12 | GT | 44 | (United States) Magnus Racing | (United States) Andy Lally (United States) John Potter | Porsche 911 GT3 Cup | 105 |
| 12 | GT | 44 | (United States) Magnus Racing | (United States) Andy Lally (United States) John Potter | Porsche 4.0L F6 | 105 |
| 13 | GT | 69 | (United States) AIM Autosport Team FXDD with Ferrari | (United States) Emil Assentato (United States) Anthony Lazzaro | Ferrari 458 Italia Grand-Am | 105 |
| 13 | GT | 69 | (United States) AIM Autosport Team FXDD with Ferrari | (United States) Emil Assentato (United States) Anthony Lazzaro | Ferrari 4.5L V8 | 105 |
| 14 | GT | 31 | (United States) Marsh Racing | (United States) Eric Curran (United States) Boris Said | Chevrolet Corvette | 105 |
| 14 | GT | 31 | (United States) Marsh Racing | (United States) Eric Curran (United States) Boris Said | Chevrolet 6.2L V8 | 105 |
| 15 | GT | 73 | (United States) Park Place Motorsports | (United States) Patrick Lindsey (United States) Patrick Long | Porsche 911 GT3 Cup | 104 |
| 15 | GT | 73 | (United States) Park Place Motorsports | (United States) Patrick Lindsey (United States) Patrick Long | Porsche 4.0L F6 | 104 |
| 16 | GT | 93 | (United States) Turner Motorsport | (United States) Michael Marsal (United States) Billy Johnson | BMW M3 | 104 |
| 16 | GT | 93 | (United States) Turner Motorsport | (United States) Michael Marsal (United States) Billy Johnson | BMW 5.0L V8 | 104 |
| 17 | GT | 63 | (United States) Scuderia Corsa Michelotto | (Italy) Alessandro Balzan (United States) Jeff Westphal | Ferrari 458 Italia Grand-Am | 104 |
| 17 | GT | 63 | (United States) Scuderia Corsa Michelotto | (Italy) Alessandro Balzan (United States) Jeff Westphal | Ferrari 4.5L V8 | 104 |
| 18 | GT | 61 | (United States) R. Ferri/AIM Motorsport Racing with Ferrari | (Italy) Max Papis (United States) Jeff Segal | Ferrari 458 Italia Grand-Am | 104 |
| 18 | GT | 61 | (United States) R. Ferri/AIM Motorsport Racing with Ferrari | (Italy) Max Papis (United States) Jeff Segal | Ferrari 4.5L V8 | 104 |
| 19 | GT | 62 | (United States) Snow Racing/Wright Motorsports | (United States) Andrew Davis (United States) Madison Snow | Porsche 911 GT3 Cup | 104 |
| 19 | GT | 62 | (United States) Snow Racing/Wright Motorsports | (United States) Andrew Davis (United States) Madison Snow | Porsche 4.0L F6 | 104 |
| 20 | GT | 57 | (United States) Stevenson Motorsports | (United States) John Edwards (Scotland) Robin Liddell | Chevrolet Camaro GT.R | 103 |
| 20 | GT | 57 | (United States) Stevenson Motorsports | (United States) John Edwards (Scotland) Robin Liddell | Chevrolet 6.2L V8 | 103 |
| 21 | DP | 01 | (United States) Chip Ganassi Racing with Felix Sabates | (United States) Scott Pruett (Mexico) Memo Rojas | Riley Mk. XXVI | 103 |
| 21 | DP | 01 | (United States) Chip Ganassi Racing with Felix Sabates | (United States) Scott Pruett (Mexico) Memo Rojas | BMW 5.0L V8 | 103 |
| 22 | DP | 43 | (United States) Team Sahlen | (United States) Joe Nonnamaker (United States) Will Nonnamaker (United States) Joe Sahlen | Riley Mk. XXVI | 101 |
| 22 | DP | 43 | (United States) Team Sahlen | (United States) Joe Nonnamaker (United States) Will Nonnamaker (United States) Joe Sahlen | BMW 5.0L V8 | 101 |
| 23 | **GX** | **70** | **(United States) Mazdaspeed/Speedsource** | **(United States) Tom Long** **(Canada) Sylvain Tremblay** | **Mazda6 GX** | **100** |
| 23 | **GX** | **70** | **(United States) Mazdaspeed/Speedsource** | **(United States) Tom Long** **(Canada) Sylvain Tremblay** | **Mazda 2.2L I4 Diesel** | **100** |
| 24 | GX | 38 | (United States) BGB Motorsports | (United States) Jim Norman (United States) Spencer Pumpelly | Porsche Cayman GX.R | 100 |
| 24 | GX | 38 | (United States) BGB Motorsports | (United States) Jim Norman (United States) Spencer Pumpelly | Porsche 3.8L F6 | 100 |
| 25 DNF | GX | 00 | (United States) Visit Florida Racing/Speedsource | (United States) Joel Miller (United States) Tristan Nunez | Mazda6 GX | 66 |
| 25 DNF | GX | 00 | (United States) Visit Florida Racing/Speedsource | (United States) Joel Miller (United States) Tristan Nunez | Mazda 2.2L I4 Diesel | 66 |
| 26 DNF | GT | 18 | (Belgium) Mühlner Motorsports America | (United States) Leh Keen (South Africa) Dion von Moltke | Porsche 911 GT3 Cup | 31 |
| 26 DNF | GT | 18 | (Belgium) Mühlner Motorsports America | (United States) Leh Keen (South Africa) Dion von Moltke | Porsche 4.0L F6 | 31 |
| 27 DNF | DP | 6 | (United States) Michael Shank Racing | (Brazil) Antonio Pizzonia (Colombia) Gustavo Yacamán | Riley Mk. XXVI | 6 |
| 27 DNF | DP | 6 | (United States) Michael Shank Racing | (Brazil) Antonio Pizzonia (Colombia) Gustavo Yacamán | Ford 5.0L V8 | 6 |

| Preceded by 2013 Chevrolet Grand-Am 200 | Rolex Sports Car Series; 2013 | Succeeded by 2013 6 Hours of The Glen |
