= Brian Frisselle =

American racing driver

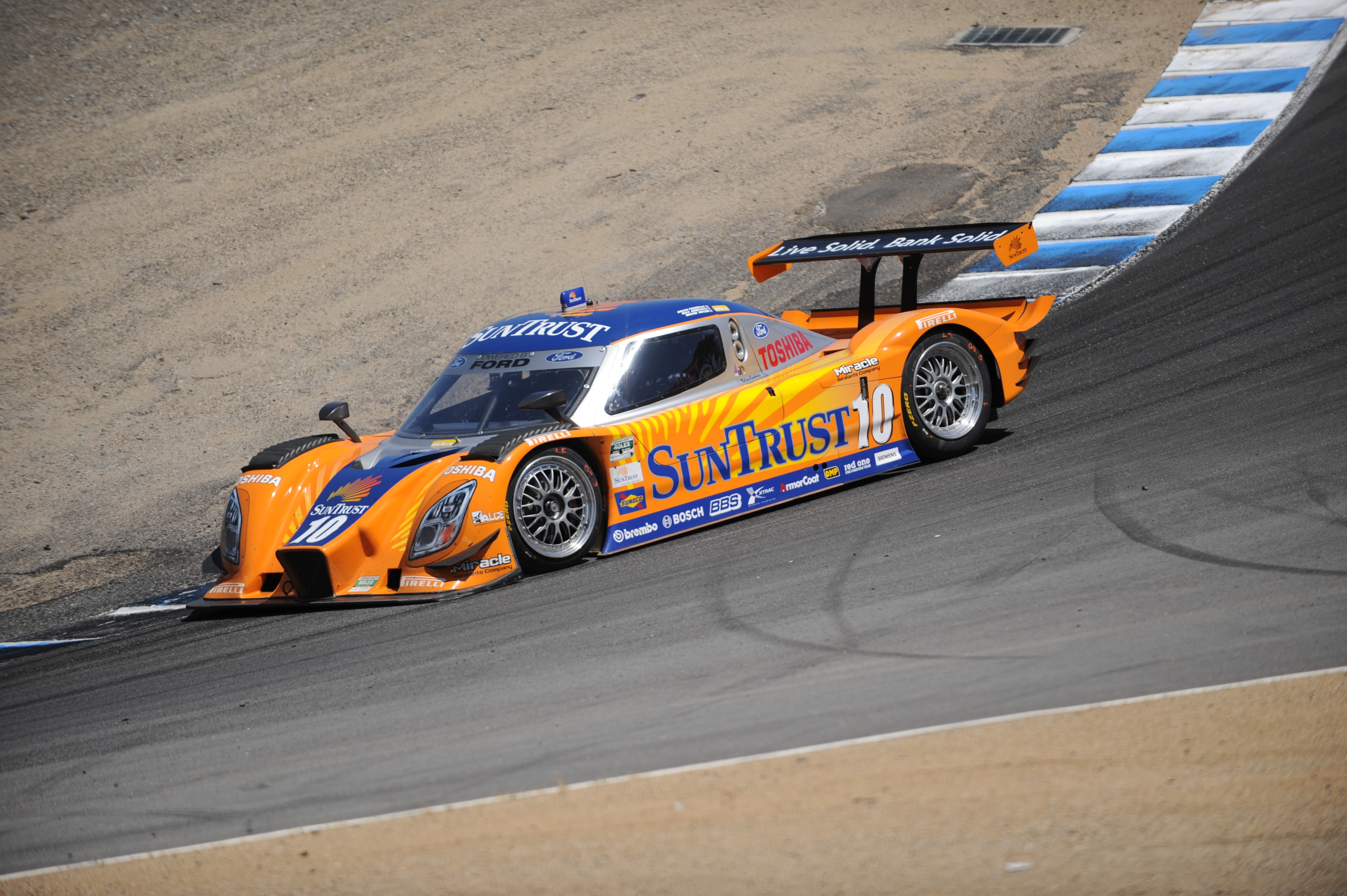
- Frisselle in 2009
- Nationality: (United States) American
- Born: December 28, 1983 (age 42) Los Angeles, California, U.S.
- Relatives: Burt Frisselle (brother)

WeatherTech SportsCar Championship career
- Debut season: 2014
- Categorisation: FIA Gold
- Former teams: Action Express Racing
- Wins: 0
- Podiums: 1
- Poles: 0

Previous series
- 2005–2013: Rolex Sports Car Series

Brian Parker Frisselle (born December 28, 1983) is an American former racing driver who primarily competed in the Rolex Sports Car Series.

Frisselle is a four-time Daytona Prototype race-winner, and finished third overall at the 2014 24 Hours of Daytona.

== Career ==
=== Early career ===
Frisselle was born into a racing family, spearheaded by his grandfather and father Brad; an IMSA GT Championship GTU class champion and an overall winner at the 1977 12 Hours of Sebring. As such, Brian began competing in karts at a young age, kicking off his racing career at the Jim Hall Kart Racing School in Ventura County, California at the age of ten. Following a family move to New Hampshire, Brian and brother Burt began competing in snowmobile racing, an activity befitting their new place of residence.

In 2002, however, Prisselle returned to the track, taking part in the Formula Dodge National Championship for a pair of races. With an initial career goal of competing in the IndyCar Series, he climbed the American open-wheel racing ladder, competing in the Formula Dodge National Championship in 2003. 2004 saw Frisselle compete full-time in the new Formula BMW USA championship, alongside the Star Mazda Championship. In the former, he scored two podium finishes, including a season-high second at Road America, en route to a sixth-place championship finish. Frisselle was also forced to miss the second race at Circuit Gilles Villeneuve after suffering a neck sprain in a crash.

=== Rolex Sports Car Series ===
In 2005, Frisselle shifted gears from open-wheel competition and began his career in sports car racing, taking on a drive in the Rolex Sports Car Series with Daytona Prototype team Synergy Racing. Frisselle's co-driver for his maiden year of endurance racing was his brother, Burt. Brian would endure a quiet season in the fiercely-competitive class, claiming a best overall finish of ninth at Mont-Tremblant and Watkins Glen. Tallying 227 championship points, the brothers concluded the season 17th in the DP-class championship. Brian and Burt returned to the team for 2006, enduring another quiet campaign with finishes in and around the top ten. Following the round at Mid-Ohio, the brothers departed the team, finishing the season with a pair of drives for fellow DP team Michael Shank Racing with a GT-class start for Tyler Tadevic sandwiched in-between. Their fifth-place finish at Barber Motorsports Park would prove to be their joint-best of the 2006 season.

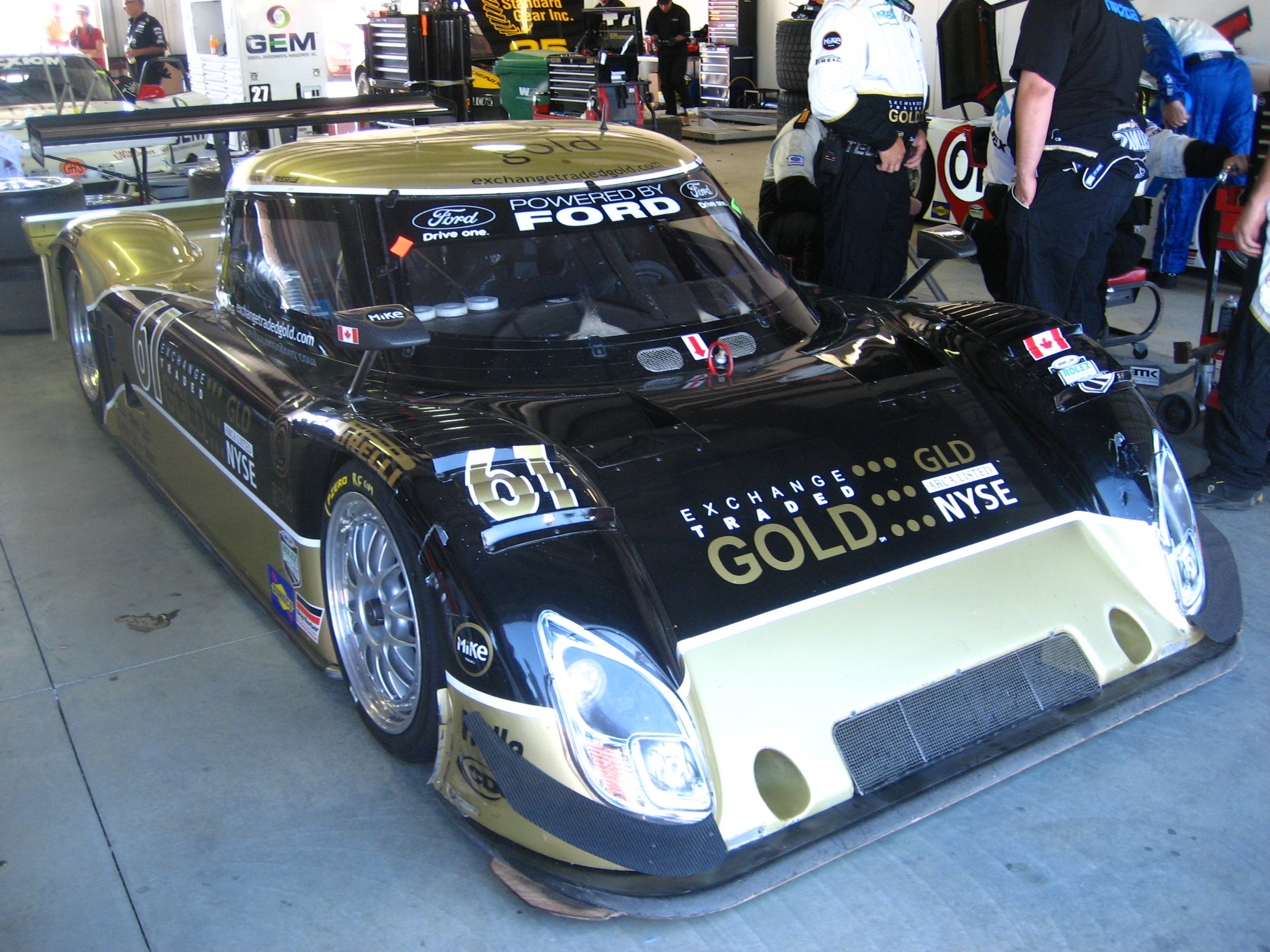
Frisselle's AIM Autosport Daytona Prototype, pictured in 2008.

In 2007, the brothers were initially set to part ways for the first time in Brian's sports car career, with Brian moving to Canadian team AIM Autosport. However, they would be reunited as the season continued, once again tallying a best finish of fifth in the season-opening 24 Hours of Daytona. Later in the season, prior to the round at VIR, the brothers took part in late model competition at Motor Mile Speedway. The two officially split in 2008, with Brian pairing full-time with Mark Wilkins to continue with AIM Autosport.

The season started off slowly for the pairing, retiring at the Rolex 24 and tallying just one top-ten finish in the first three races. However, a streak of four consecutive top-ten finishes followed, culminating with a pole position for Wilkins at Daytona in July. However, finishes of 18th and 15th would follow, ahead of the team's first victory of the season (and the first of Frisselle's Rolex Sports Car Series career) in Montreal. Erstwhile leader Darren Law ran out of fuel on the way to the line, and Wilkins won a drag race between himself and the #16 entry to score the closest win in series history at 0.064 seconds. The following race at Watkins Glen saw Frisselle claim his first individual pole position in the series. Leading off from pole, Frisselle and Wilkins led 79 of 82 race laps, claiming the entry's second consecutive race victory and the second of Frisselle's career. Another podium finish would follow in the next round at Sonoma, and the entry would claim their third pole of the season during the penultimate round of the season at New Jersey Motorsports Park. At the conclusion of the season, Wilkins and Frisselle found themselves fifth in the championship.

==== Departure from AIM Autosport (2009–2013) ====
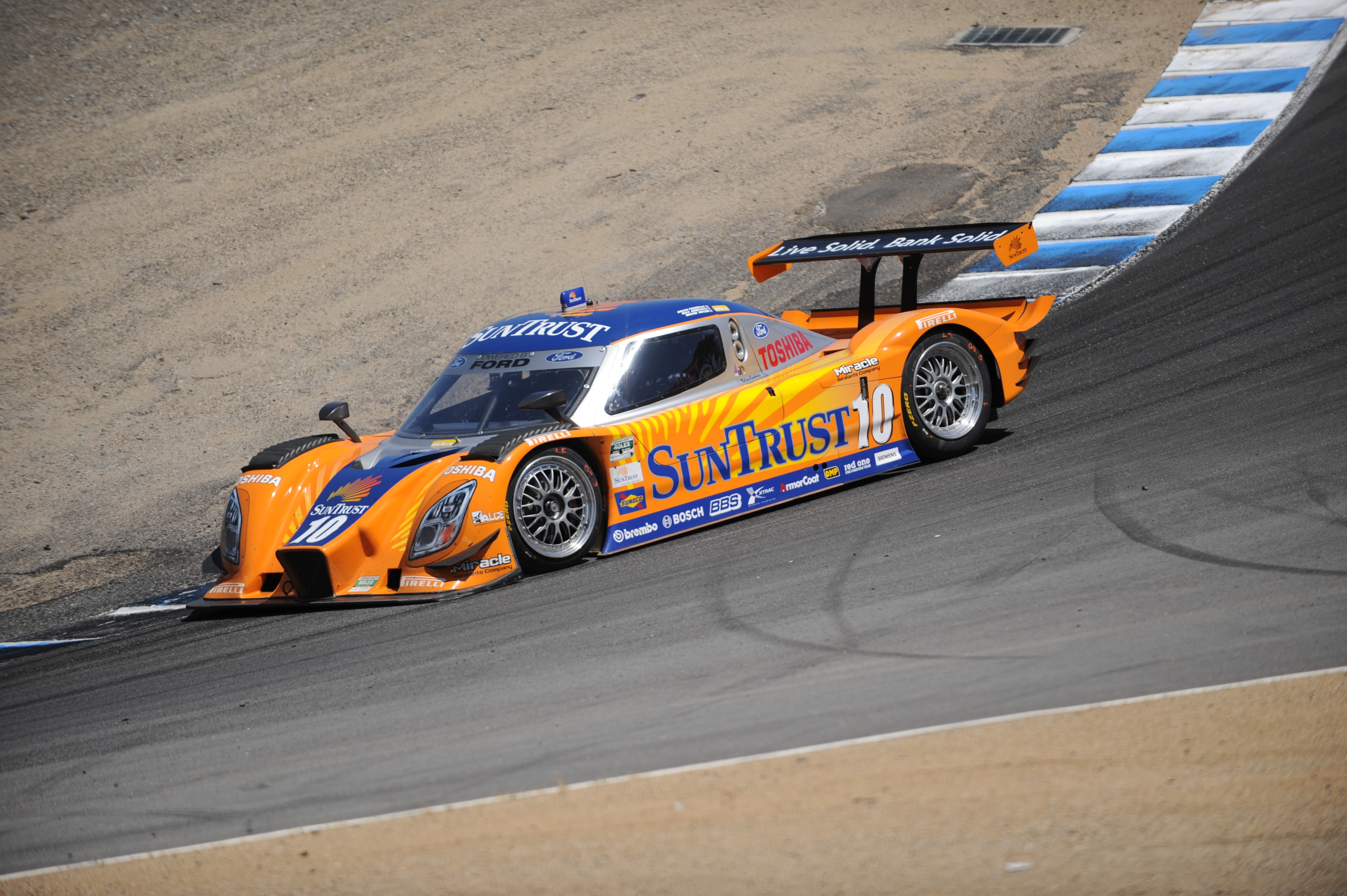
Frisselle's Daytona Prototype at WeatherTech Raceway Laguna Seca in 2009.

Following his breakout 2008 season, Frisselle signed with SunTrust Racing, replacing Michael Valiante as Max Angelelli's co-driver for 2009. Frisselle kicked off the season with a career-best fourth-place finish at the Rolex 24, before taking the team's first podium of the season two rounds later in New Jersey. Following consecutive podiums at Laguna Seca and Watkins Glen, Angelelli and Frisselle broke through for their first victory of the season at Daytona in July. The victory was the third of Frisselle's career, and the first for SunTrust Racing in almost a year. The entry finished outside the top ten in the next two race events, before returning to the top step of the podium at Circuit Gilles Villeneuve. The duo would conclude the season with another podium at Miller Motorsports Park, registering a total of six podiums and two race victories over the course of the season. Frisselle finished the season just 12 points shy of champions Jon Fogarty and Alex Gurney, tallying a third-place points finish.

For 2010, Frisselle departed SunTrust Racing, pivoting to fellow DP-class contenders Michael Shank Racing. He paired for the full season with Valiante, whom he had replaced just the previous season in the SunTrust entry. Valiante and Frisselle would claim a single podium finish over the course of the season, taking third overall at Lime Rock Park. Ultimately, the duo would claim a ninth-place points finish. Following a serious fire suffered during the 6 Hours of Watkins Glen, the team was forced to switch from a Riley chassis to Dallara from the Mid-Ohio round onwards.

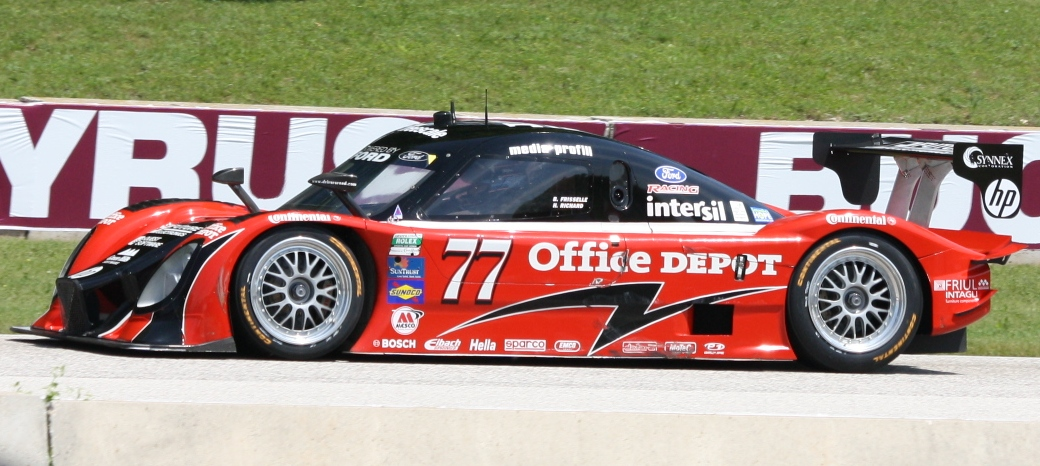
Frisselle at Road America in 2011

The 2011 season saw Frisselle join his third team in as many seasons, joining the No. 77 entry fielded by Doran Racing. Frisselle formed a Pro-Am combination, driving for the full season alongside Frenchman Henri Richard. Frisselle began the season with a 7th-place qualifying result at the Rolex 24. The pairing endured a difficult start to the season, retiring in the first two races of the season. During the fourth round of the season at VIR, Frisselle and Richard claimed their best finish of the season, registering a fifth-place result. Later that season at New Jersey Motorsports Park, the duo were on pace for a strong finish before cooling issues relegated them to a ninth-place finish. Richard vacated his seat for the final round after locking up the Rookie of the Year award before the final round at Mid-Ohio, paving the way for Frisselle and brother Burt to reunite for the first time since 2006. Frisselle returned to Doran Racing for a part-time schedule in 2012, taking part in the Rolex 24, 6 Hours of Watkins Glen, and the season finale at Lime Rock.

For the final season of the Rolex Sports Car Series, Frisselle joined Action Express Racing for a full-season campaign. The season saw Frisselle claim a single podium finish at Road America, paired with his brother. During the final race of the season, and the last in series history, Frisselle made his 100th career start.

=== Later career ===
The new-for-2014 Tudor United SportsCar Championship introduced upgraded Daytona Prototype entries, and Frisselle continued with Action Express for the Tequila Patrón North American Endurance Cup in an entry fielded in partnership with Delta-ADR. At the 2014 24 Hours of Daytona, Frisselle claimed his first podium finish at the event, despite battling a throttle problem for most of the race. The #9 entry entered the 2014 running of Petit Le Mans in contention for the Endurance Cup title, but a 10th-place finish saw them fall short.

In December 2014, Frisselle won the 25 Hours of Thunderhill alongside co-drivers Randy Pobst, Alex Lloyd, and Kyle Marcelli.

== Personal life ==
Born in California, Frisselle has lived in New Hampshire, Colorado, and Hawaii throughout his life. Frisselle graduated from Seabury Hall in Makawao, Hawaii.

Frisselle and brother Burt hosted a Denver Broncos podcast in Aspen, Colorado during their residence there. Frisselle's mother is from Colorado, and he considers himself a Broncos fan.

Following his racing career, Frisselle took up a position at the family business, Fahrenheit Body Spas.

== Racing record ==
=== Career summary ===
Season	Series	Team	Races	Wins	Poles	F/Laps	Podiums	Points	Position
2002	Formula Dodge National Championship		2	0	0	0	0	3	35th
2002-03	Formula Dodge Western Race Series		14	7	?	?	?	221	**2nd**
2003	Formula Dodge National Championship		13	3	0	1	4	138	4th
2003	Formula TR Pro Series FR 1600		?	0	?	?	1	?	5th
2004	Formula BMW USA	Atlantic Racing Team; PoleVision Racing	13	0	0	0	2	68	6th
2004	Star Mazda Championship		7	0	0	?	1	148	22nd
2005	Rolex Sports Car Series – DP	Synergy Racing	14	0	0	0	0	227	17th
2006	Rolex Sports Car Series – DP	Synergy Racing; Michael Shank Racing	11	0	0	0	0	176	34th
2006	Rolex Sports Car Series – GT	Tyler Tadevic	1	0	0	0	0	26	71st
2007	Rolex Sports Car Series – DP	AIM Autosport	14	0	0	0	0	183	33rd
2008	Rolex Sports Car Series – DP	AIM Autosport	14	2	1	0	3	332	5th
2009	Rolex Sports Car Series – DP	SunTrust Racing	12	2	0	1	6	325	**3rd**
2010	Rolex Sports Car Series – DP	Michael Shank Racing	12	0	0	0	1	287	14th
2011	Rolex Sports Car Series – DP	Doran Racing	12	0	0	0	0	263	8th
2012	Rolex Sports Car Series – DP	Doran Racing; Action Express Racing	3	0	0	0	0	73	20th
2013	Rolex Sports Car Series – DP	Action Express Racing	12	0	0	0	1	276	8th
2014	United SportsCar Championship – Prototype	Action Express Racing	4	0	0	0	1	106	22nd

=== Complete Grand-Am Rolex Sports Car Series results ===
(key) (Races in bold indicate pole position)

Year	Team	Class	Chassis	Engine	1	2	3	4	5	6	7	8	9	10	11	12	13	14	Rank	Points	Ref
2005	Synergy Racing	DP	Doran DP	Ford	DAY; 17	MIA; 15	CAL; 18	LGA; 23	MON; 9	WGL; 9	DAY; 19	BAR; 16	WGL; 11	MOH; 11	PHO; 17	WGL; 14	VIR; 19	MEX; 13	17th	227	
2006	Synergy Racing	DP	Doran DP	Porsche	DAY; 25	MEX; 10	MIA; 27	LBH; 26	VIR; 25	LGA; 17	PHO; 22	WGL; 9	MOH; 22	DAY		WGL			34th	176	
2006	Tyler Tadevic	GT	Pontiac GTO.R	Pontiac											BAR; 5				34th	176	
2006	Michael Shank Racing	DP	Riley DP	Lexus													SON; 11	MIL; 5	34th	176	
2007	AIM Autosport	DP	Riley DP	Lexus	DAY; 5	MEX; 7	MIA; 10	VIR; 14	LGA; 9	WGL; 14	MOH; 14	DAY; 12	IOW; 15	BAR; 12	MON; 7	WGL; 14	SON; 9	MIL; 11	33rd	183	
2008	AIM Autosport	DP	Riley DP	Ford	DAY; 19	MIA; 8	MEX; 15	VIR; 6	LGA; 6	WGL; 7	MOH; 4	**DAY**; 18	BAR; 15	MON; 1	**WGL**; 1	SON; 3	**JER**; 6	MIL; 6	5th	332	
2009	SunTrust Racing	DP	Dallara DP08	Ford 5.0L V8	DAY; 4	VIR; 13	JER; 2	LGA; 3	WGL; 2	MOH; 8	DAY; 1	BAR; 14	WGL; 12	MON; 1	MIL; 2	MIA; 7			3rd	325	
2010	Michael Shank Racing	DP	Riley Mk. XX	Ford 5.0L V8	DAY; 7	MIA; 10	BAR; 7	VIR; 7	LIM; 3	WGL; 13									9th	287	
2010	Michael Shank Racing	DP	Dallara DP08	Ford 5.0L V8							MOH; 4	DAY; 12	JER; 7	WGL; 6	MON; 6	MIL; 6			9th	287	
2011	Doran Racing	DP	Dallara DP	Ford	DAY; 17	MIA; 13	BAR; 10	VIR; 5	LIM; 8	WGL; 6	ELK; 9	LGA; 9	JER; 9	WGL; 8	MON; 8	MOH; 9			8th	263	
2012	Doran Racing	DP	Dallara DP	Ford	DAY; 7	BAR	MIA	JER	DET	MOH	ELK	WGL; 10	IMS	WGL	MON	LGA			20th	73	
2012	Action Express Racing	DP	Corvette DP	Chevrolet													LIM; 4		20th	73	
2013	Action Express Racing	DP	Corvette DP	Chevrolet	DAY; 8	COT; 5	BAR; 11	ATL; 8	DET; 11	MOH; 7	WGL; 5	IMS; 16	ELK; 3	KAN; 5	LGA; 11	LIM; 8			8th	276	

=== Complete WeatherTech SportsCar Championship results ===
(key) (Races in bold indicate pole position)

Year	Team	Class	Chassis	Engine	1	2	3	4	5	6	7	8	9	10	11	Rank	Points	Ref
2014	Action Express Racing	P	Coyote Corvette DP	Chevrolet 5.5L V8	DAY; 3	SEB; 8	LBH	LGA	DET	WGL; 4	MOS	IMS	ELK	COT	PET; 10	22nd	106	
