= John Pew =

American racing driver (born 1956)

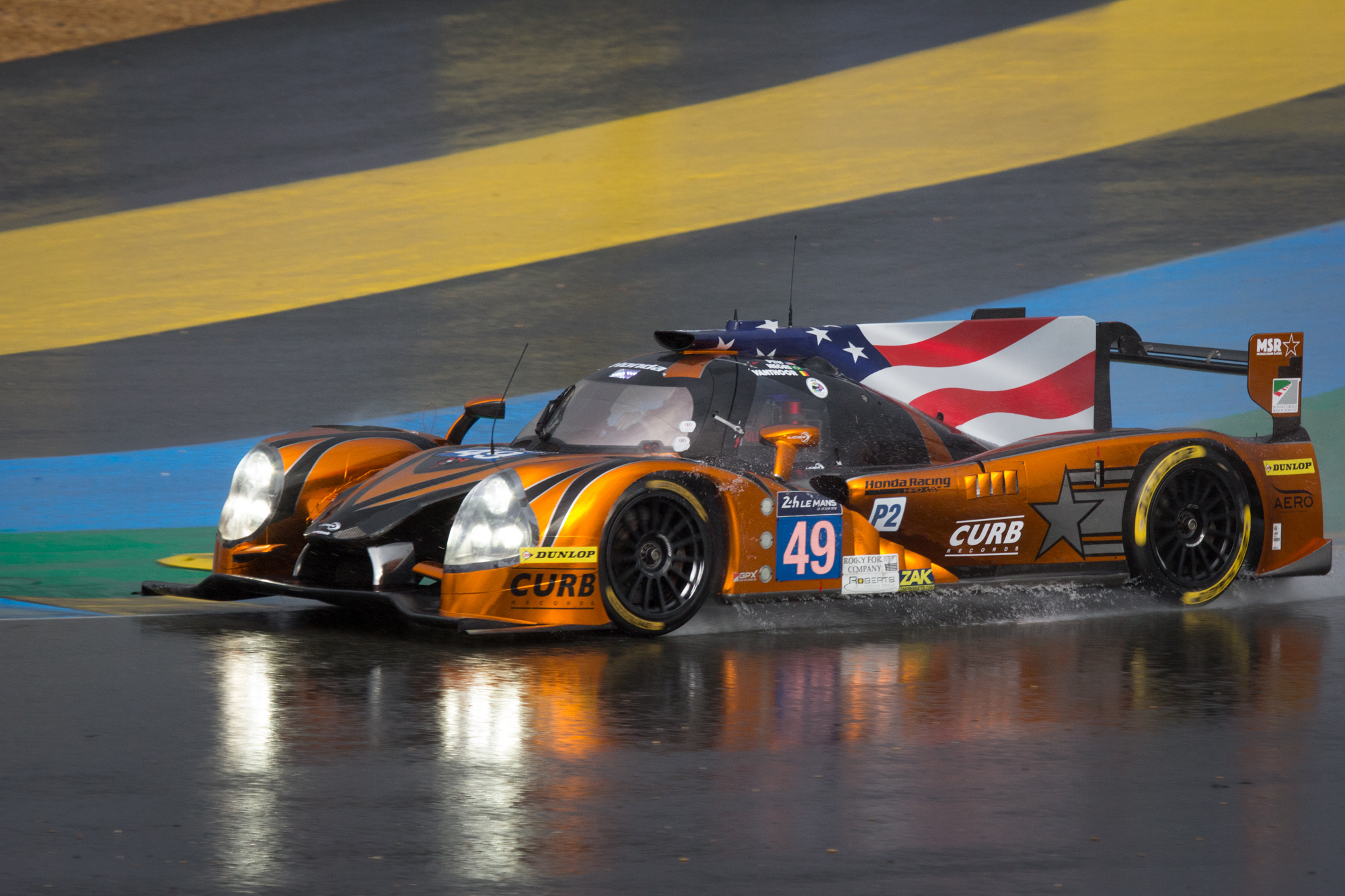
- A Ligier JS P2-Honda driven by Pew alongside Laurens Vanthoor and Oswaldo Negri Jr. at the 2016 24 Hours of Le Mans
- Nationality: (United States) American
- Born: April 1, 1956 (age 70) Grand Rapids, Michigan, United States

Grand-Am Rolex Sports Car Series career
- Current team: Michael Shank Racing
- Categorisation: FIA Silver (until 2015); FIA Bronze (2016–)
- Former teams: Synergy Racing; Michael Baughman Racing

Championship titles
- 2005: Star Mazda Masters Championship

Awards
- 2010-2011: GRAND-AM Trueman Award

John Pew (born April 1, 1956 in Grand Rapids, Michigan) is an American racing driver, who competes in the Grand-Am Rolex Sports Car Series for Michael Shank Racing. He won the 2012 24 Hours of Daytona overall in the No. 60 Michael Shank Racing Ford-Riley Daytona Prototype.

== Early racing career ==
Pew began racing in 2000 in the Skip Barber Racing School. After making his sports car racing debut (see below), he moved to the Star Mazda Masters Championship, winning the title in 2005 for drivers over 45 years old. He returned to the Star Mazda Masters Championship in 2006 but only managed sixth in points, but was the highest-finishing Masters driver in two races.

== Grand-Am ==
Pew made his Rolex Sports Car Series debut in 2004 when he competed in 24 Hours of Daytona in a Baughman Racing Chevrolet Corvette. In 2006, he also competed in the 24 Hours of Daytona with co-drivers Hal Prewitt, Steve Marshall, Danny Marshall, and Ben McCrackin in a Synergy Racing Porsche 911, finishing 17th.

In 2007, Pew moved full-time to sports car racing in Grand-Am's Rolex Sports Car Series Daytona Prototype class with Michael Shank Racing co-driving their car with Ian James. Pew finished 25th in drivers points in the DP class.

In 2008, Pew, James, and Raphael Matos captured his first win at Miller Motorsports Park, and Pew improved to ninth in DP class points. In 2009, he returned to Michael Shank Racing, this time teaming with Michael Valiante and finished 12th in DP driver points.

For 2010, his Michael Shank Racing teammate was Oswaldo Negri and Pew improved to seventh in points. Pew also won the Jim Trueman award for the top Pro-Am racer in the Grand-Am series. The team of Pew and Negri returned to Shank in 2011 and Pew improved to sixth in DP points, again winning the Jim Trueman award. Pew and Negri returned to Michael Shank Racing in 2012. The team of Pew and Negri along with one-off co-drivers A. J. Allmendinger and Justin Wilson won the 2012 24 Hours of Daytona.

== Personal life ==
Pew is married, to Stephanie. He is an avid recreational sailor who has sailed over 100,000 miles across the world's oceans and currently resides in North Palm Beach, Florida.

== Racing record ==
=== IMSA WeatherTech SportsCar Championship series results ===
Year	Team	Class	Make	Engine	1	2	3	4	5	6	7	8	9	10	11	Rank	Points
2014	Michael Shank Racing	P	Ford EcoBoost Riley DP	Ford Ecoboost 3.5 L V6 Turbo	DAY; 12	SIR; 9	LBH; 9	LGA; 10	DET; 4	WGL; 7	MSP; 5	IND; 6	ELK; 2	COA; 5	PET; 6	7th	281
2015	Michael Shank Racing w/ Curb Agajanian	P	Ligier JS P2	Honda HR28TT 2.8 L V6 Turbo	DAY; 5	SIR; 13	LBH; 6	LGA; 3	DET; 2	WGL; 7	MSP; 3	ELK; 4	COA; 4	PET; 9		6th	273
2016	Michael Shank Racing w/ Curb Agajanian	P	Ligier JS P2	Honda HR28TT 2.8 L V6 Turbo	DAY; 11	SIR; 7	LBH; 7	LGA; 1	DET	WAT; 3	MSP; 6	ELK; 4	COA; 6	PET; 1		8th	255

* Season still in progress

=== 24 Hours of Le Mans results ===
Year	Team	Co-Drivers	Car	Class	Laps	Pos.	Class Pos.
2016	(United States) Michael Shank Racing	(Brazil) Oswaldo Negri (Belgium) Laurens Vanthoor	Ligier JS P2-Honda	LMP2	345	14th	9th
