= Marsh Racing =

American professional stock car racing team

- Owner(s): Ted Marsh; Linda Marsh
- Series: K&N Pro Series East
- Race drivers: 31.

Marsh Racing is an American professional stock car racing team that last competed in the NASCAR K&N Pro Series East. The team is owned by Ted Marsh, a longtime Chevrolet team sporting the No. 31 with backing from Whelen Engineering. His current Rolex Series drivers include Boris Said and Eric Curran; his former NASCAR drivers included veterans Steve Park and Richard Childress Racing development driver Peyton Sellers.

== Busch Series ==
Marsh Racing began competing in the Busch Series in 1998 with Ted Christopher competing in three races for the team. Driving the No. 13 Whelen Engineering Chevrolet, Christopher posted a best finish of 10th at Nazareth. In 1999, the team attempted 12 races, again with Ted Christopher driving the car. The team would make five races and post a best finish of 8th at Nazareth.

For the 2000 season, Marsh Racing selected Steve Park as the team's driver and Whelen Engineering returned as the sponsor for a limited schedule with the newly renumbered No. 31 car. Park put the car in the field nine of the fourteen events the team attempted and gave the team a new top finish when he placed 6th at Richmond. He also gave the team three top ten starts and a best start of second at Richmond.

Park returned to the team in 2001 and made all seven on the team's attempts. He posted five top ten finishes including a fourth at Bristol. The team almost managed two top ten starts with a third place start at New Hampshire. In September 2001, while Steve Park was driving the car he suffered a moderate concussion and was unable to race. Andy Santerre took over the car for the final three races of the limited schedule for the season, however mechanical failures plagued each race.

For the 2002 season David Green, Tim Fedewa, and Dave Blaney drove the car at different points throughout the season. The team posted a best finish of 14th at Bristol with Fedewa driving. The team suffered through four mechanical failures and three crashes throughout the season. Blaney returned to the car for the 2003 season after working with the team late in the 2002 season.

The team also switched to Ford from Chevrolet partway the 2003 season, with Blaney bringing support from Jasper Motorsports, the team he was driving for in Winston Cup at the time. Competing in ten events he managed six top 15 finishes with a best finish of 9th at Richmond. His best start during the season was a 4th at Chicagoland.

In 2004, the team again started the year with Dave Blaney driving the No. 31 Whelen Engineering Ford; however, after three races he was replaced with Todd Bodine. Bodine would give the car its best finish of the season when he finished 5th at Homestead–Miami, however the team only managed three top 20 finishes out of the eight races Marsh Racing competed in.

Dave Blaney returned the No. 31 team in 2005 and brought support from Richard Childress Racing as they switched back to Chevrolet. The team's best finish of the season came at Dover when Blaney finished 12th and the best start of the season came at Richmond where the team started 7th.

For the 2006 season it was announced that Steve Park would return to Marsh Racing and drive the car in ten races. Peyton Sellers made his Busch Series debut at New Hampshire with the No. 31 team and made another start at Memphis Motorsports Park.

=== Car No. 31 results ===
Year	Driver	No.	Make	1	2	3	4	5	6	7	8	9	10	11	12	13	14	15	16	17	18	19	20	21	22	23	24	25	26	27	28	29	30	31	32	33	34	35	Owners	Pts
1998	Ted Christopher	13	Chevy	DAY	CAR	LVS	NSV	DAR	BRI	TEX	HCY	TAL	NHA; 43	NZH; 10	CLT	DOV	RCH; DNQ	PPR	GLN; 13	MLW	MYB	CAL	SBO	IRP	MCH	BRI	DAR	RCH; DNQ	DOV	CLT	GTY	CAR; DNQ	ATL	HOM; DNQ					80th	98
1999	Ted Christopher	13	Chevy	DAY	CAR	LVS	ATL	DAR	TEX	NSV	BRI; DNQ	TAL	CAL	NHA; 12	RCH; DNQ	NZH; 8	CLT	DOV; 30	SBO	GLN; DNQ	MLW; 40	MYB	PPR	GTY; 29	IRP	MCH; DNQ	BRI	DAR	RCH; DNQ	DOV; DNQ	CLT	CAR	MEM	PHO	HOM				56th	563
2000	Steve Park	31	Chevy	DAY	CAR	LVS; DNQ	ATL	DAR; 17	BRI	TEX; 13	NSV	TAL	CAL	RCH; 6	NHA; 10	CLT	DOV	SBO	MYB	GLN	MLW	NZH	PPR	GTY; 25	IRP	MCH	BRI	DAR; DNQ	RCH; DNQ	DOV; 9	CLT; DNQ	CAR; 12	MEM	PHO; 41	HOM; 29				50th	1093
2001	Steve Park	31	Chevy	DAY	CAR	LVS	ATL	DAR; 7	BRI	TEX	NSH	TAL	CAL	RCH; 9	NHA; 6	NZH	CLT	DOV; 5	KEN	MLW	GLN	CHI; 42	GTY	PPR	IRP	MCH	BRI; 4	DAR; 38	RCH	DOV									43rd	993
2001	Andy Santerre	31	Chevy																												KAN; 32	CLT	MEM	PHO; 42	CAR	HOM; 38			43rd	993
2002	Johnny Benson Jr.	31	Chevy	DAY	CAR	LVS	DAR	BRI	TEX	NSH	TAL	CAL	RCH; 43																										50th	493
2002	David Green	31	Chevy											NHA; 33	NZH	CLT	DOV; 38	NSH	KEN; 42	MLW	DAY	CHI	GTY	PPR	IRP	MCH													50th	493
2002	Tim Fedewa	31	Chevy																								BRI; 14	DAR	RCH; 31	DOV; 36	KAN	CLT	MEM	ATL	CAR	PHO			50th	493
2002	Dave Blaney	31	Chevy																																		HOM; 35		50th	493
2003	Dave Blaney	31	Chevy	DAY	CAR	LVS	DAR	BRI	TEX	TAL	NSH	CAL	RCH; 31	GTY	NZH																								44th	1133
2003	Dave Blaney	31	Ford													CLT; 11	DOV; 30	NSH	KEN	MLW	DAY	CHI; 13	NHA; 13	PPR	IRP	MCH; 10	BRI	DAR	RCH; 9	DOV	KAN	CLT; 18	MEM	ATL; 10	PHO	CAR	HOM; 16		44th	1133
2004	Dave Blaney	31	Ford	DAY	CAR	LVS; 33	DAR	BRI	TEX; 22	NSH	TAL	CAL	GTY	RCH; 21	NZH	CLT																							49th	963
2004	Todd Bodine	31	Ford														DOV; 20	NSH	KEN	MLW	DAY	CHI; 24	NHA; 14	PPR	IRP	MCH	BRI	CAL	RCH; DNQ	DOV	KAN			ATL; DNQ	PHO	DAR; 32	HOM; 5		49th	963
2004	Randy LaJoie	31	Ford																													CLT; 17	MEM						49th	963
2005	Dave Blaney	31	Chevy	DAY	CAL	MXC	LVS; 19	ATL	NSH	BRI	TEX	PHO	TAL	DAR	RCH; 42	CLT; 24	DOV; 12	NSH	KEN	MLW	DAY	CHI; 25	NHA; 35	PPR	GTY	IRP	GLN	MCH	BRI	CAL	RCH; 21	DOV	KAN; 20	CLT	MEM	TEX; 31	PHO	HOM; DNQ	49th	805
2006	Steve Park	31	Chevy	DAY	CAL	MXC	LVS; 30	ATL	BRI	TEX	NSH	PHO	TAL	RCH; 41	DAR; 39	CLT	DOV; 37	NSH	KEN	MLW	DAY	CHI			GTY; 30	IRP; 32	GLN	MCH	BRI	CAL	RCH	DOV	KAN	CLT					53rd	467
2006	Peyton Sellers	31	Chevy																				NHA; 37	MAR											MEM; 33	TEX	PHO	HOM	53rd	467

== K&N Pro Series East ==
In early 2008, Turner Motorsports Development driver James Buescher was driving at select races. James qualified 18th, and finished 20th at the US Cellular 200 in Newton, Iowa. Then came the Camping World East Series 125 At The Glen at Watkins Glen. They qualified 20th, but due to engine trouble, had to withdraw from the event.

== SCCA World Challenge ==
Next came a new driver for the #31 team, Eric Curran.

Curran has a long history of racing all types of vehicles, but more recently he has been driving Speed Touring and Speed World Challenge GT cars. In 2007, he finished 5th in Speed Touring points, and won four races in the #30 Speed World Challenge GT Corvette (built and maintained by Marsh Racing). In 2008, Curran finished 18th in Speed Touring (only racing 3 races), while finishing in the top 10 in points in the #30 World GT car (a full 10 race schedule).

Curran's Camping World East Series debut was a success with the Marsh Racing Team. He competed at the Mohegan Sun NASCAR Camping World Series 200 at Limerock Park in Lakeville, CT. Due qualifying being rained out, Curran had to start 26th based on team points. He fought his way up through the field to eventually lead by lap 21. After 82 laps, Curran finished in 6th place, a positive performance considering it was his first time in this type of car.

Ted Christopher got a chance to hop back in the car for the team's final race of the season at the Carquest Fall Final at Stafford Motor Speedway in Stafford Springs, CT.

The Marsh team ran the 2009 season in World Challenge GT, and also looking for a full-time sponsor for the NASCAR Camping World Series East car.

== Rolex Sports Car Series ==
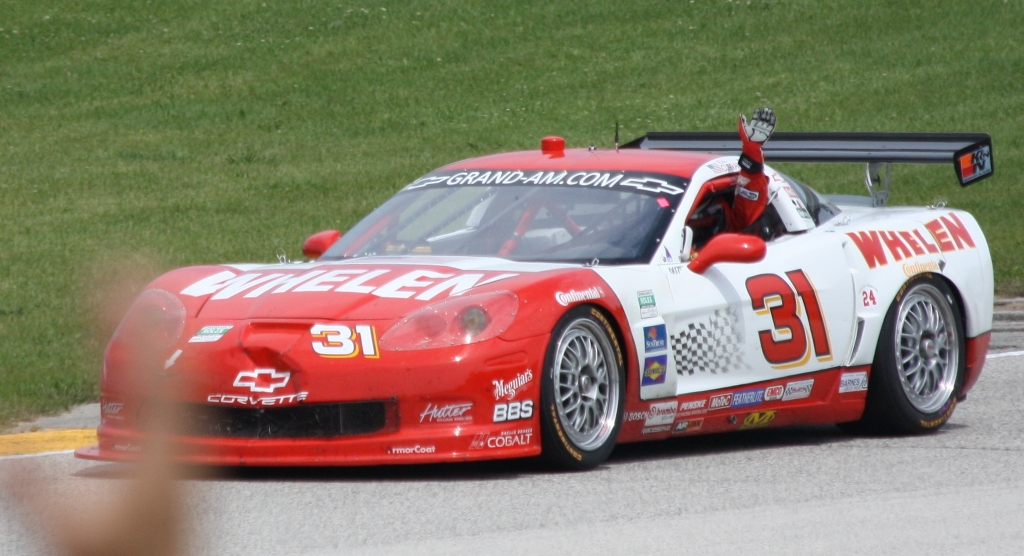
#31 Corvette, celebrating winning at Road America in 2011

Marsh Racing debuted in the Rolex Series GT class in 2010 at Barber Motorsports Park, with Said and Curran in the No. 31 Corvette. The pair finished 16th in their initial outing. After several months of development, Said earned the pole position at Circuit Gilles Villeneuve, and he and Curran finished ninth. Curran won the pole for the next race, the season finale at Miller Motorsports Park, but mechanical problems forced a 17th-place result. The team finished 15th in points.

== United SportsCar Championship ==
Marsh Racing stepped up to the Prototype class for the 2014 season, fielding a Corvette DP for Eric Curran and Boris Said. They finished 41st overall in the 2014 24 Hours of Daytona.
