= Scott Mayer (racing driver) =

American racing driver (born 1964)

- Nationality: (United States) American
- Born: August 31, 1964 (age 62) Franklin, Wisconsin, United States
- Relatives: Sam Mayer, Sarah Mayer
- Categorisation: FIA Bronze
- Years active: 2003-2018

IndyCar Series career
- 3 races run over 1 year
- Best finish: 31st (2003)
- First race: 2003 Grand Prix of Miami (Miami)
- Last race: 2003 Indy Japan 300 (Twin Ring Motegi)
Wins	Podiums	Poles
0	0	0

Scott Mayer (born August 31, 1964) is a businessman and former driver in the Indy Racing League IndyCar Series.

In 1985, Mayer founded QPS Employment Group, a staffing firm in the greater Milwaukee area. As of 2023, the company has 57 branches across eight states and employs thousands of associate employees, one of the largest employment firms in the Midwest. Mayer currently serves as the Chairman of QPS Employment Group. Mayer is also a past President of the Wisconsin Association of Staffing Services and is a Board Member of the Wisconsin Lutheran College, the Metropolitan Milwaukee Association of Commerce, and Wisconsin Manufacturers & Commerce.

Mayer began his career as a racecar driver competing in the first three races of the 2003 IndyCar Series season for PDM Racing and crashed in all three races. He ultimately failed to complete rookie orientation for the Indy 500 that season. He entered the 2005 Indianapolis 500 with A. J. Foyt Enterprises but again failed to complete rookie orientation. He also made four starts in the Indy Pro Series in 2004 and 2005. In 2010, he tested with Doran Racing at Putnam Park in Indiana. In 2011, he raced in the 24 Hours of Daytona for Starworks Motorsport. The team finished 44th. In 2012, he competed part-time in the Rolex Sports Car Series and finished 24th in Daytona Prototype points with a best finish of fifth at Road America. In August 2013, he won the Daytona Prototype class at Road America. He returned to the series in 2013 before retiring in 2018.

== Personal life ==
Mayer is married to Susanne Mayer and has two children, Sarah and Sam. Mayer’s daughter, Sarah Mayer, works in the film industry and has contributed to a variety of independent film projects in both production and on-screen roles.

Mayer's son, Sam Mayer, followed in his father’s footsteps, signing with JR Motorsports for the 2018 season at just 15 years old. He won US Legend Car Winter Heat Championship, the Summer Shootout and US Legend Car Asphalt Nationals in 2017 before going on to win back-to-back championships in the NASCAR K&N Pro Series East (2019) and ARCA Menards Series East (2020).

In 2023, Mayer explored a campaign for United States Senate, seeking the Republican nomination to challenge Tammy Baldwin in the 2024 United States Senate election in Wisconsin. In March 2024, Mayer decided against running for the GOP nomination.

Mayer has been involved in philanthropic efforts supporting charitable organizations, educational programs, workforce-development initiatives, and community causes throughout the United States.

== Career results ==
=== Complete American open–wheel racing results ===
(key) (Races in bold indicate pole position)

==== IRL IndyCar Series ====
Year	Team	No.	Chassis	Engine	1	2	3	4	5	6	7	8	9	10	11	12	13	14	15	16	17	Rank	Points	Ref
2002	PDM Racing	18	Dallara	Chevrolet	HOM	PHX	CAL	NAZ	INDY	TEX	PIK	RIR	KAN	NSH	MIS	KTY	GAT	CHI; DNQ	TEX			-	0	
2003	PDM Racing	18	Dallara	Chevrolet	HMS; 21	PHX; 19	MOT; 24	INDY; DNQ	TEX	PIK	RIR	KAN	NSH	MIS	GAT	KTY	NAZ	CHI	FON	TEX		31st	26	
2005	A. J. Foyt Enterprises	41	Panoz	Toyota	HMS	PHX	STP	MOT	INDY; DNQ	TXS	RIR	KAN	NSH	MIL	MIS	KTY	PPIR	SNM	CHI	WGL	FON	-	0	

==== Indy Pro Series ====
Year	Team	1	2	3	4	5	6	7	8	9	10	11	12	13	14	15	16	Rank	Points	Ref
2004	Sam Schmidt Motorsports	HMS	PHX	INDY	KAN	NSH	MIL	MIS	KTY	PPIR	CHI; 12	FON	TXS; 10					**22nd**	**32**	
2005	Michael Crawford Motorsports	HMS	PHX; 7	STP	INDY	TXS	IMS	NSH	MIL; 11	KTY	PPIR	SNM; 13	CHI; 12	WGL	FON			**15th**	**80**	
2007	Mile High Motorsports	HMS	STP1	STP2	INDY	MIL	IMS1	IMS2	IOW	WGL1; Wth	WGL2; Wth	NSH	MOH	KTY	SNM1	SNM2	CHI	**NR**	**0**	

=== WeatherTech SportsCar Championship ===
Year	Entrant	Class	Chassis	Engine	1	2	3	4	5	6	7	8	9	10	11	Rank	Points	Ref
2014	Starworks Motorsport	P	Riley Mk XXVI DP	Dinan (BMW) 5.0 L V8	DAY; 17											57th	3	
2014	Starworks Motorsport	P	Riley Mk XXVI DP	Honda HR35TT 3.5 L V6 Turbo		SEB; 17	LBH	LGA	DET	WGL	MOS	IMS	ELK; 12	COA	PET	57th	3	
2015	Starworks Motorsport	P	Riley Mk XXVI DP	Dinan (BMW) 5.0 L V8	DAY; 9	SEB; WD^{1}	LBH	LGA	BEL	WGL	MOS	ELK	COA	ATL		30th	23	
2017	Starworks Motorsport	PC	Oreca FLM09	Chevrolet LS3 6.2 L V8	DAY; 4	SEB	COA	DET	WGL	MOS	ELK	PET				22nd	28	

^{1} The No. 7 of Starworks Motorsport withdrew from the 12 Hours of Sebring before Practice.
