= Enzo Potolicchio =

Venezuelan racing driver and businessman (born 1968)

- Potolicchio in 2012
- Nationality: (Venezuela) Venezuelan
- Born: 7 August 1968 (age 58) Caracas, Venezuela

FIA World Endurance Championship Rolex Sports Car Series career
- Current team: 8 Star Motorsports
- Categorisation: FIA Silver (until 2013); FIA Bronze (2014–)
- Car number: 22,41,81
- Former teams: HP-Tech Motorsport// Starworks MotorSports // AF Corsa

Previous series
- Ferrari Challenge, Formula Ford, Porsche Super Cup

Championship titles
- 1998, 2001, 2010, 2011,2012: Venezuelan Formula Ford 1600, 2000, Porsche SúperCup, Ferrari Challenge 2010/11

Awards
- 1998: Venezuelan Automobile Driver of the Year/ WEC Rockie of the year 2012. WEC LMP2 Champion 2012

Vicente "Enzo" Potolicchio (born 7 August 1968 in Caracas) is a Venezuelan racing driver and businessman, who competes in the FIA World Endurance Championship and Rolex Sports Car Series for Starworks Motorsport. He won the 2012 24 Hours of Le Mans and 2012 12 Hours of Sebring, both in the LMP2 class.

== Early racing career ==
Potolicchio spent his early career racing Formula Ford, both at home in Venezuela where he was champion in 2005, and in the American F2000 Championship Series. He also took part in Venezuelan Porsche Super Cup in 1998, which saw him earn 11 victories and the country's Automobile Driver of the Year award.

== Ferrari Challenge ==
Potolicchio participated in two Ferrari Challenge North America races in 2009, earning a victory and a third-place finish. In 2010 and 2011, he won back-to-back Ferrari Challenge titles.

== Rolex Sports Car Series ==
Potolicchio made his Grand-Am debut in 2011, racing in the Rolex Sports Car Series for Starworks Motorsport. He earned his first career victory at Mid-Ohio, teamed with Ryan Dalziel, finishing 13th in the end-of-season Daytona Prototype points standings.

In 2012, Potolicchio finished second overall in the 2012 24 Hours of Daytona, teamed with Ryan Dalziel, Alex Popow, Lucas Luhr and Allan McNish. He has collected four podium finishes in eight races to date.

Leading up to the second race at Watkins Glen, Potolicchio announced he was leaving the Rolex Series, but would continue to support the No. 8 Starworks car in the title challenge.

== FIA World Endurance Championship ==
Together with Starworks, Potolicchio made his FIA World Endurance Championship debut at the 2012 12 Hours of Sebring, where he, Ryan Dalziel and Stéphane Sarrazin finished third overall and first in LMP2. The trio finished 14th in class at the Six Hours of Spa-Francorchamps, punctuated by a mechanical issue.

Potolicchio and teammates Ryan Dalziel and Tom Kimber-Smith won the Le Mans in the LMP2 class. Starworks also won the FIA LMP2 Trophy in the 2012 FIA World Endurance Championship season.

In 2013, Potolicchio announced that he would enter the 2013 FIA WEC season with his newly created team, 8Star Motorsports, competing with one Ferrari 458 Italia GT2.

== Complete motorsports results ==
=== American Open-Wheel racing results ===
(key) (Races in bold indicate pole position, races in italics indicate fastest race lap)

==== USF2000 National Championship results ====
Year	Entrant	1	2	3	4	5	6	7	8	9	10	11	12	13	14	15	16	Pos	Points
2001	Amores Motorsports	HMS1; 25	HMS2; 13	HMS3; 14	WGI1; 12	WGI2; 24	IRP	MOH1	MOH2	ROA1	ROA2	MOH3	SEB1	SEB2				**20th**	**26**
2004	Aiken Racing	SEB1	SEB2	ATL1	ATL2	LS1	LS2	MOS1	MOS2	MOH1; 7	MOH2; 9	SON1	SON2	MOH3	MOH4	ROA1	ROA2	**N.C.**	**N.C.**
2005	Cape Motorsports	ATL1; 3	ATL2; 7	MOH1; 6	MOH2; 4	CLE1	CLE2	ROA1	ROA2	MOH3	MOH4	VIR1	VIR2					**12th**	**72**

=== Complete IMSA SportsCar Championship results ===
(key) (Races in bold indicate pole position) (Races in italics indicate fastest lap)

Year	Entrant	Class	Make	Engine	1	2	3	4	5	6	7	8	9	10	Pos.	Points
2014	8Star Motorsports	PC	Oreca FLM09	Chevrolet LS3 6.2 L V8	DAY; 2	SEB	LGA	KAN	WGL	IMS	ELK	VIR	COA	PET	28th	33
2015	AF Corse	GTD	Ferrari 458 Italia GT3	Ferrari 4.5L V8	DAY	SEB; 10	LGA	BEL	WGL	LIM	ELK	VIR	AUS	ATL	62nd	1

=== Complete FIA World Endurance Championship results ===
Year	Entrant	Class	Car	Engine	1	2	3	4	5	6	7	8	Rank	Points
2012	Starworks Motorsport	LMP2	HPD ARX-03b	Honda HR28TT 2.8 L Turbo V6	SEB; 3	SPA; 29	LMS; 7	SIL; 9	SÃO; 7	BHR; 8	FUJ; 9	SHA; 8	9th	53.5
2013	8 Star Motorsports	LMGTE Am	Ferrari 458 Italia GT2	Ferrari 4.5 L V8	SIL; 3	SPA; 1	LMS; 8	SÃO; 2	**COA**; 4	FUJ; 4	SHA; 1	BHR; 2	2nd	128
2014	8 Star Motorsports	LMGTE Am	Ferrari 458 Italia GT2	Ferrari 4.5 L V8	SIL; Ret	SPA; 9	LMS	COA	FUJ	SHA	BHR	SÃO	25th	4

=== 24 Hours of Le Mans results ===
Year	Team	Co-Drivers	Car	Class	Laps	Pos.	Class Pos.
2012	(United States) Starworks Motorsport	(United Kingdom) Ryan Dalziel (United Kingdom) Tom Kimber-Smith	HPD ARX-03b	LMP2	354	7th	**1st**
2013	(United States) 8 Star Motorsports	(Portugal) Rui Águas (Australia) Jason Bright	Ferrari 458 Italia GTC	GTE; Am	294	37th	10th
