= Coyote (chassis) =

Brand of racing chassis

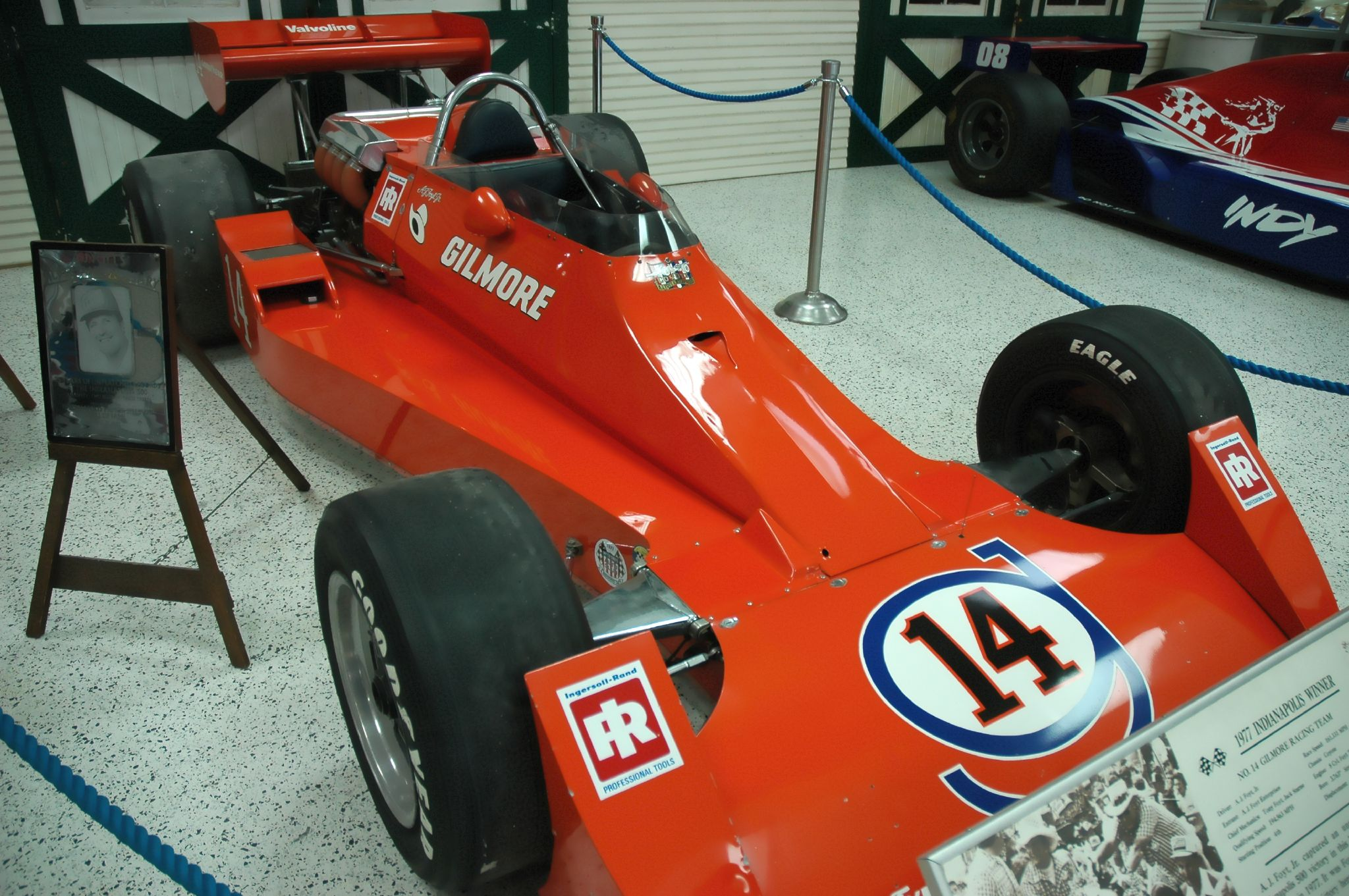
The Coyote-Foyt chassis that A. J. Foyt drove to victory at Indy in 1977

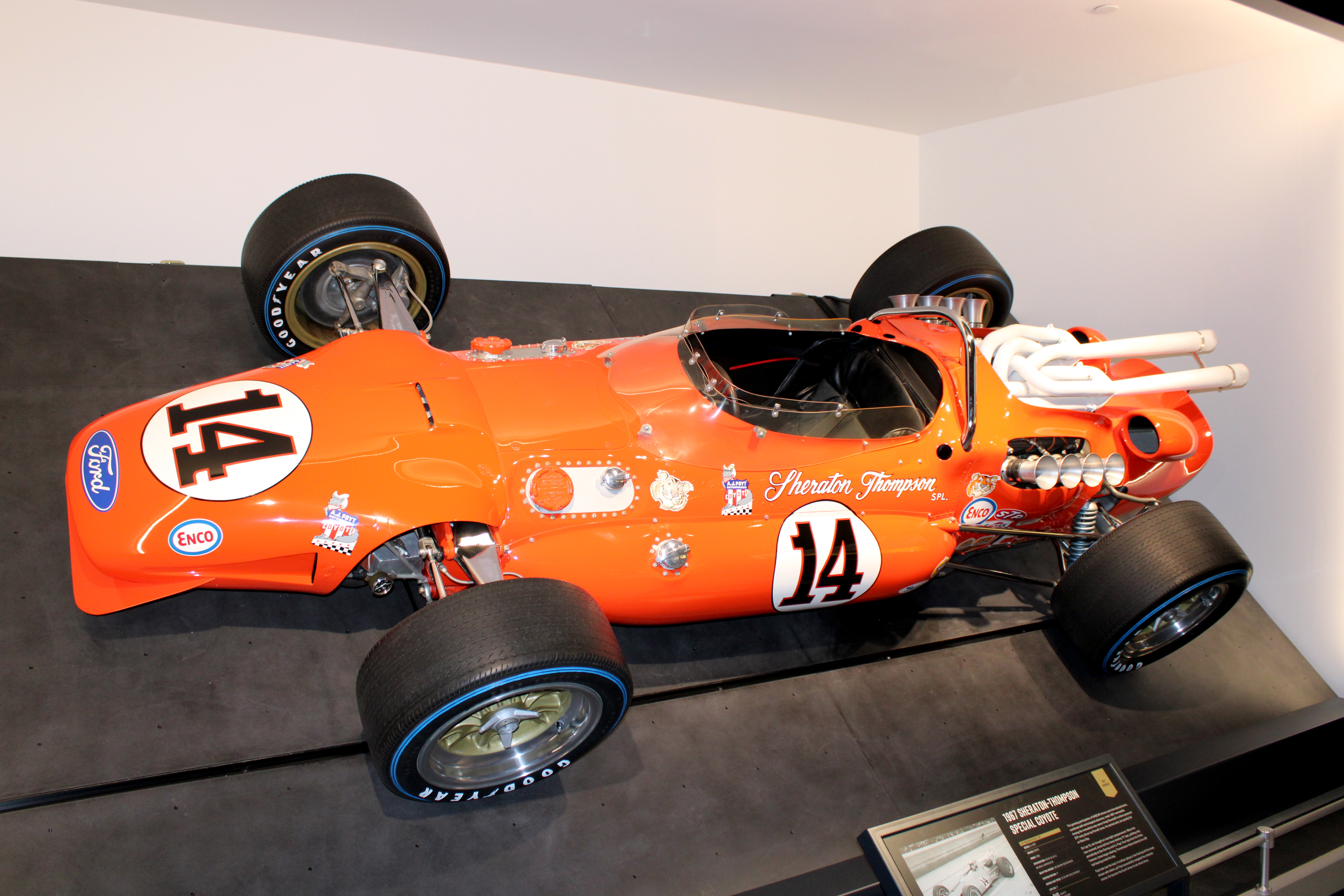
The Coyote-Foyt chassis that A. J. Foyt drove to victory at Indy in 1967

Coyote was a brand of racing chassis designed and built for the use of A. J. Foyt's race team in USAC Championship car racing including the Indianapolis 500. It was used from 1966 to 1983 with Foyt himself making 141 starts in the car, winning 25 times. George Snider had the second most starts with 24. Jim McElreath has the only other win with a Coyote chassis.

Foyt drove a Coyote to victory in the Indy 500 in 1967 and 1977.

With Foyt's permission, fellow Indy 500 champion Eddie Cheever's Cheever Racing began using the Coyote name for his new Daytona Prototype chassis, derived from the Fabcar chassis design that he had purchased the rights to in 2007.

Today, Foyt runs his team using the old Coyote logo on his race cars.
