= Michael Shank =

American auto racing driver

Michael Shank (born September 22, 1966) is an American race car team owner and former race car driver born in Columbus, Ohio. Before leaving driving to concentrate on car ownership, he ran one race in the 1996–97 Indy Racing League season, the 1997 Las Vegas 500K at Las Vegas Motor Speedway. He started racing in 1989, winning SCCA Ohio Valley Region's Novice Driver of the Year. Shank also won the 1996 Player's/Toyota Atlantic C2 championship.

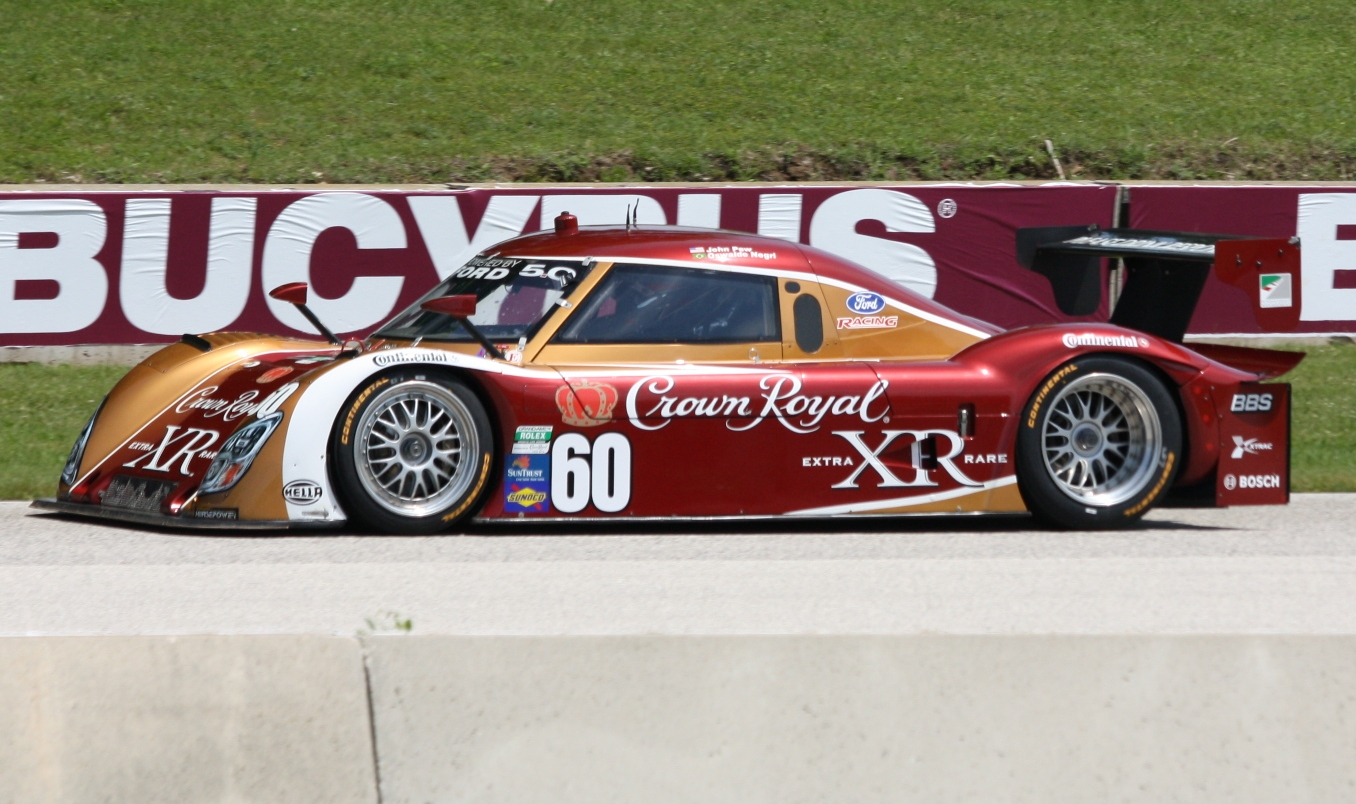
Michael Shank Racing 2011 Rolex Sports Car

As an owner of Meyer Shank Racing, he was car owner for Sam Hornish Jr. when he won the 1999 Formula Atlantic series Rookie of the Year title. In 2006, his car, driven by Justin Wilson, A. J. Allmendinger, Oswaldo Negri and Mark Patterson, finished in second position overall and in the Daytona Prototype class in the Rolex 24 Hours of Daytona. Shank has been twice named Formula Atlantic Team Owner of the Year.

Hélio Castroneves won the 2021 Indy 500 while racing for the team. It was Castroneves' career record-tying fourth Indy 500 victory, and the team's first-ever victory in the IndyCar Series.

== American open-wheel racing results ==
(key) (Races in bold indicate pole position)

=== SCCA National Championship Runoffs ===
Year	Track	Car	Class	Finish	Start	Status
1988	Road Atlanta	Swift DB2	S2000	23	3	Running
1994	Mid Ohio	Ralt RT5	Formula Atlantic	9	3	Running

=== IndyCar ===
Year	Team	Chassis	Engine	1	2	3	4	5	6	7	8	9	10	Rank	Points	Ref
1996–97	Nienhouse Motorsports	Riley & Scott Mk V	Oldsmobile	NWH	LSV	WDW	PHX	INDY	TXS	PPIR	CLT	NH2	LV2; 16	46th	19	
