= Mario Farnbacher =

German racing driver (born 1992)

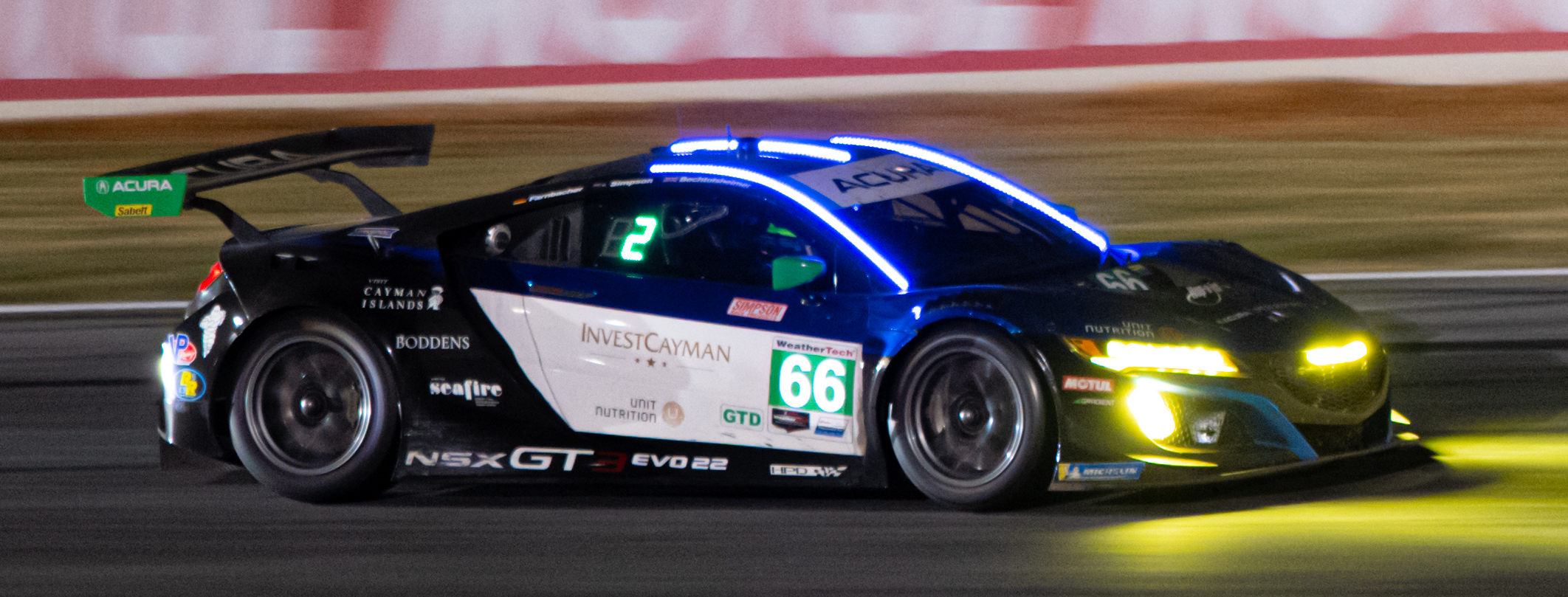
- Nationality: German
- Born: 14 May 1992 (age 34) Ansbach, Germany
- Relatives: Dominik Farnbacher (brother)

IMSA SportsCar Championship career
- Debut season: 2014
- Current team: Forte Racing
- Categorisation: FIA Silver (until 2018); FIA Gold (2019–)
- Car number: 78
- Former teams: NGT Motorsport; Burtin Racing / Goldcrest Motorsports; Alex Job Racing; Riley Motorsports; 3GT Racing; Meyer Shank Racing w/ Curb-Agajanian; Magnus Racing with Archangel Motorsports; Compass Racing; Gradient Racing; Heart of Racing Team

Previous series
- American Le Mans Series; Rolex Sports Car Series

Championship titles
- 2019, 2020 2022: IMSA SportsCar Championship – GTD class GT World Challenge America – Pro-Am

Mario Farnbacher (born 14 May 1992) is a German racecar driver. He won the IMSA SportsCar Championship in the GTD class in 2019 and 2020, and also won the GT World Challenge America Pro-Am title in 2022. He has class victories at the Petit Le Mans, 12 Hours of Sebring, and 24 Hours of Nürburgring endurance races.

== Career ==
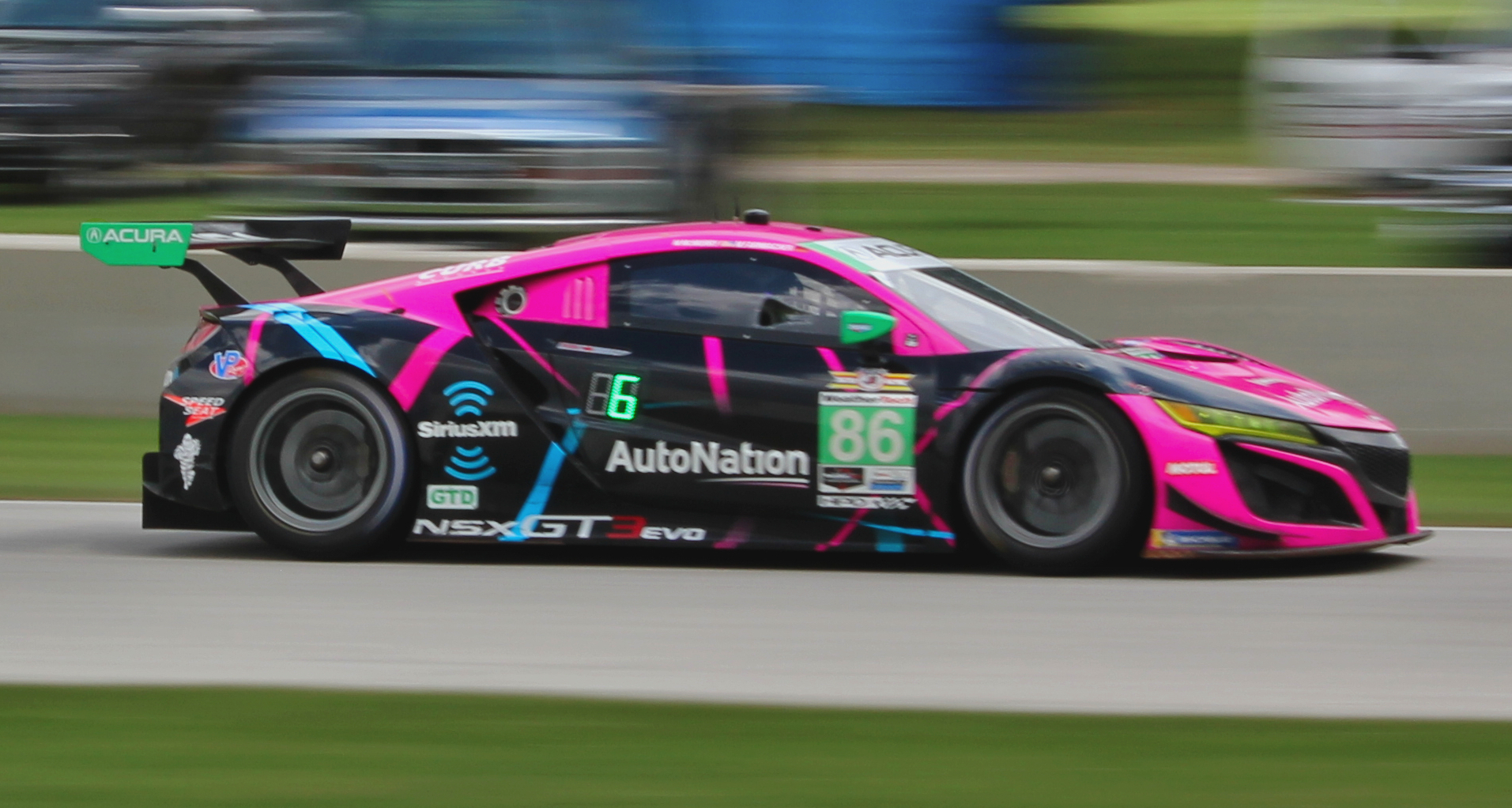
The Acura NSX GT3 Evo in which Farnbacher won his second IMSA title in 2020

Farnbacher began competing in the IMSA SportsCar Championship in 2014 with Team Seattle, driving a Porsche 911 GT America. He scored his first class victory the following season, winning the GTD class at the 2015 12 Hours of Sebring.

In 2019, Farnbacher won the IMSA SportsCar Championship GTD class championship with co-driver Trent Hindman. The duo claimed one race win during the season, taking class victory at the 6 Hours of Watkins Glen. The following season, Farnbacher scored his second consecutive GTD class championship, this time with co-driver Matt McMurry.

With MSR's move to the DPi class for 2021, Farnbacher found himself initially without a ride. In January, however, it was announced that he would compete with Magnus Racing in their new Acura NSX GT3 at the 24 Hours of Daytona. For most of the WeatherTech Sprint Cup races, beginning at Mid-Ohio, he joined Compass Racing, driving alongside Jeff Kingsley. Farnbacher also competed with Gradient Racing at the VIR round as a substitute for injured Marc Miller.

For the 2022 IMSA SportsCar Championship season, Farnbacher embarked upon a Michelin Endurance Cup-only campaign with Gradient Racing, alongside a full-season effort in the GT World Challenge America with HPD Academy graduate Ashton Harrison. Driving alongside Kyffin Simpson and Till Bechtolsheimer, he led Gradient Racing to victory in the 25th running of the Petit Le Mans endurance race, where the team were the overall winner among all the GT entries. In GTWC America, Farnbacher and Harrison took four class wins and three further podiums to enter the final race 15 points behind the leaders. Following a second-place finish at the Indianapolis 8 Hour, the duo claimed the Pro-Am class title by five points.

Farnbacher began 2023 by taking part in the Michelin Pilot Challenge event at Daytona, driving for HART. It was his first time piloting a TCR touring car. The remainder of Farnbacher's season involved a second season in the GT World Challenge America alongside Harrison, this time in the Pro class. The pair were involved in the title fight all season long, claiming a class victory early in the season at Sonoma before adding an overall victory at COTA. Ultimately, they would settle for second in the championship, 44 points behind champions Eric Filgueiras and Stevan McAleer.

For 2024, Farnbacher left his role as a factory driver for Honda Performance Development to join Aston Martin team The Heart of Racing for the IMSA Endurance Cup rounds.

== Racing record ==
=== Career summary ===
Season	Series	Team	Races	Wins	Poles	F/Laps	Podiums	Points	Position
2010	ADAC Formel Masters	ma-con Motorsport	21	3	1	2	12	231	**3rd**
2011	ADAC Formel Masters	ma-con Motorsport	3	0	0	1	0	173	6th
2011	ADAC Formel Masters	Motopark Academy	20	1	0	2	4	173	6th
2011	Toyota Racing Series	ETEC Motorsport	12	0	0	0	1	397	12th
2011	ADAC GT Masters	Farnbacher ESET Racing	2	0	0	0	1	26	26th
2012	ADAC GT Masters	Farnbacher ESET Racing	14	1	1	0	2	54	14th
2012	American Le Mans Series - GTC	NGT Motorsport	1	1	0	0	1	24	18th
2013	ADAC GT Masters	Farnbacher Racing	16	0	1	0	3	84	12th
2013	Rolex Sports Car Series - GT	Burtin Racing / Goldcrest Motorsports	1	0	0	0	0	21	57th
2013	American Le Mans Series - GTC	NGT Motorsport	1	0	0	0	0	0	NC
2013	Nürburgring Endurance Series - SP9	Haribo Racing Team	1	0	?	?	0	?	?
2013	24 Hours of Nürburgring - SP7	Haribo Racing Team	1	0	0	0	0	N/A	?
2013	Porsche Carrera Cup Asia	Team BetterLife	1	0	?	?	0	?	?
2014	United SportsCar Championship - GTD	Team Seattle / Alex Job Racing	11	0	0	0	2	259	10th
2014	ADAC GT Masters	Farnbacher Racing	10	0	0	0	0	3	40th
2015	United SportsCar Championship - GTD	Team Seattle / Alex Job Racing	10	2	0	1	4	267	4th
2016	IMSA SportsCar Championship - GTD	Team Seattle / Alex Job Racing	10	1	5	2	2	285	5th
2016	24 Hours of Nürburgring - SP7	Black Falcon Team TMD Friction	1	1	0	0	1	N/A	**1st**
2017	International GT Open - GT3 Pro	Farnbacher Racing	11	2	?	?	5	69	8th
2017	IMSA SportsCar Championship - GTD	Riley Motorsports	4	1	0	0	2	115	24th
2017	Nürburgring Endurance Series - SP9	Haribo Racing Team	1	0	1	?	1	?	?
2018	IMSA SportsCar Championship - GTD	Michael Shank Racing with Curb-Agajanian	5	1	0	0	2	182	13th
2018	IMSA SportsCar Championship - GTD	3GT Racing	2	0	1	0	0	182	13th
2018	Pirelli World Challenge - GT	HART	2	0	0	0	0	26	14th
2018	24 Hours of Nürburgring - SP8	Ring Racing with Novel	1	0	0	0	1	N/A	**2nd**
2019	IMSA SportsCar Championship - GTD	Meyer Shank Racing with Curb-Agajanian	10	1	2	2	5	283	**1st**
2019	Intercontinental GT Challenge	Honda Team Motul	2	0	1	0	0	10	25th
2019	Blancpain GT Series Endurance Cup	Honda Team Motul	1	0	0	0	0	11	20th
2019	24 Hours of Nürburgring - SP6	SetupWizzard Racing	1	0	1	1	1	N/A	**2nd**
2020	IMSA SportsCar Championship - GTD	Meyer Shank Racing with Curb-Agajanian	10	2	2	1	6	286	**1st**
2020	Intercontinental GT Challenge	Team Honda Racing	4	0	1	0	1	31	5th
2020	GT World Challenge Europe Endurance Cup	Team Honda Racing	1	0	0	0	0	5	26th
2021	IMSA SportsCar Championship - GTD	Compass Racing	7	0	0	1	0	1575	15th
2021	IMSA SportsCar Championship - GTD	Magnus Racing with Archangel Motorsports	1	0	0	0	0	1575	15th
2021	IMSA SportsCar Championship - GTD	Gradient Racing	1	0	0	0	0	1575	15th
2021	24 Hours of Nürburgring - SP7	Krohn Racing	1	0	0	0	0	N/A	Ret
2022	GT World Challenge America - Pro-Am	Racers Edge Motorsports	13	4	4	2	8	212	**1st**
2022	IMSA SportsCar Championship - GTD	Gradient Racing	5	1	0	0	2	1003	26th
2022	24 Hours of Nürburgring - Cup2	Krohn Racing	1	0	0	0	0	N/A	Ret
2023	GT World Challenge America - Pro	Racers Edge Motorsports	13	2	3	2	6	192	**2nd**
2023	Michelin Pilot Challenge - TCR	HART	1	0	0	0	0	190	33rd
2023	IMSA SportsCar Championship - GTD	Gradient Racing	1	0	0	0	0	579	40th
2023	IMSA SportsCar Championship - GTD	Racers Edge Motorsports with WTR Andretti	1	0	0	0	0	579	40th
2024	IMSA SportsCar Championship - GTD Pro	Heart of Racing Team	2	0	0	0	0	592*	6th*
2025	IMSA SportsCar Championship - GTD	Forte Racing	10	0	0	0	1	2266	13th
2025	Nürburgring Langstrecken-Serie - SP7	RPM Racing	1	1	?	?	1	0	NC†
2026	Michelin Pilot Challenge - TCR	Pegram Racing	2	0	0	0	0	360	30th
2026	IMSA SportsCar Championship - GTD	Magnus Racing	2	0	0	0	0	393	55th

=== Complete American Le Mans Series results ===
(key) (Races in bold indicate pole position)

Year	Team	Class	Make	Engine	1	2	3	4	5	6	7	8	9	10	Rank	Points	Ref
2012	NGT Motorsport	GTC	Porsche 997 GT3 Cup	Porsche 4.0 L Flat-6	SEB	LBH	LGA	LIM	MOS	MOH	ELK	BAL	VIR	PET; 1	18th	24	
2013	NGT Motorsport	GTC	Porsche 997 GT3 Cup	Porsche 4.0 L Flat-6	SEB; 10	LBH	LGA	LIM	MOS	ELK	BAL	COT	VIR	PET	NC	0	

=== Complete Grand-Am Rolex Sports Car Series results ===
(key) (Races in bold indicate pole position)

Year	Team	Class	Make	Engine	1	2	3	4	5	6	7	8	9	10	11	12	Rank	Points	Ref
2013	Burtin Racing / Goldcrest Motorsports	GT	Porsche 911 GT3	Porsche 4.0 L Flat-6	DAY; 10	COT	BAR	ATL	DET	MOH	WGL	IMS	ELK	KAN	LGA	LIM	92nd		

=== Complete IMSA SportsCar Championship results ===
(key) (Races in bold indicate pole position)

Year	Team	Class	Make	Engine	1	2	3	4	5	6	7	8	9	10	11	12	Rank	Points	Ref
2014	Team Seattle	GTD	Porsche 911 GT America	Porsche 4.0 L Flat-6	DAY; 15	SEB; 3	LGA; 8	DET; 2	WGL; 16	MOS; 6	IMS; 6	ELK; 6	VIR; 15	COA; 18	PET; 5		10th	291	
2015	Team Seattle	GTD	Porsche 911 GT America	Porsche 4.0 L Flat-6	DAY; 18	SEB; 1	LGA; 3	DET; 1	WGL; 7	LIM; 4	ELK; 8	VIR; 3	COA; 4	PET; 7			4th	267	
2016	Team Seattle	GTD	Porsche 911 GT3 R	Porsche 4.0 L Flat-6	DAY; 8	SEB; 4	**LGA**; 1	BEL; 4	**WGL**; 3	MOS; 12	LIM; 14	**ELK**; 12	VIR; 4	**AUS**; 7	PET; 8		5th	285	
2017	Riley Motorsports - Team AMG	GTD	Mercedes-AMG GT3	Mercedes-AMG 6.2 L V8	DAY; 3	SEB; 1	LBH	AUS	DET	WGL; 10	MOS	LIM	ELK	VIR	LGA	PET; 4	24th	115	
2018	Michael Shank Racing w/ Curb-Agajanian	GTD	Acura NSX GT3	Acura 3.5 L Turbo V6	DAY; 11	SEB; 7	MOH	BEL; 1					VIR; 3	LGA	PET; 12		13th	182	
2018	3GT Racing	GTD	Lexus RCF GT3	Lexus 5.4 L V8					**WGL**; 4	MOS	LIM; 5	ELK					13th	182	
2019	Michael Shank Racing w/ Curb-Agajanian	GTD	Acura NSX GT3 Evo	Acura 3.5 L Turbo V6	DAY; 4	**SEB**; 7	MOH; 2	DET; 11	**WGL**; 1	MOS; 2	**LIM**; 2	ELK; 5	VIR; 2	LGA; 8	PET; 12		1st	283	
2020	Michael Shank Racing w/ Curb-Agajanian	GTD	Acura NSX GT3 Evo	Acura 3.5 L Turbo V6	DAY; 10	DAY; 3	SEB	ELK; 2	VIR; 2	ATL; 1	MOH; 5	CLT; 7	**PET**; 10	**LGA**; 1	SEB; 3		1st	288	
2021	Magnus Racing with Archangel Motorsports	GTD	Acura NSX GT3 Evo	Acura 3.5 L Turbo V6	DAY; 11	SEB											15th	1575	
2021	Richard Mille - Compass Racing	GTD	Acura NSX GT3 Evo	Acura 3.5 L Turbo V6			MOH; 5	DET; 9	WGL	WGL; 9	LIM; 9	ELK; 12	LGA; 13	LBH; 11			15th	1575	
2021	Gradient Racing	GTD	Acura NSX GT3 Evo	Acura 3.5 L Turbo V6											VIR; 15	PET	15th	1575	
2022	Gradient Racing	GTD	Acura NSX GT3 Evo22	Acura 3.5 L Turbo V6	DAY; 13	SEB; 11	LBH; 2	LGA	MOH	DET	WGL; 9	MOS	LIM	ELK	VIR	PET; 1	26th	1003	
2023	Gradient Racing	GTD	Acura NSX GT3 Evo22	Acura 3.5 L Turbo V6	DAY; 4	SEB											40th	579	
2023	Racers Edge Motorsports with WTR	GTD	Acura NSX GT3 Evo22	Acura 3.5 L Turbo V6			LBH; DNS	MON	WGL	MOS	LIM	ELK; 8	VIR	IMS	PET		40th	579	
2024	Heart of Racing Team	GTD Pro	Aston Martin Vantage AMR GT3 Evo	Aston Martin 4.0 L Turbo V8	DAY; 4	SEB; 5	LGA; 6	DET	WGL	MOS; 5	ELK	VIR	IMS; 6	PET; 4			13th	1729	
2025	Forte Racing	GTD	Lamborghini Huracán GT3 Evo 2	Lamborghini 5.2 L V10	DAY; 12	SEB; 12	LBH; 12	LGA; 5	WGL; 14	MOS; 13	ELK; 2	VIR; 12	IMS; 13	PET; 13			13th	2266	
2026	Magnus Racing	GTD	Aston Martin Vantage AMR GT3 Evo	Aston Martin 4.0 L Turbo V8	DAY	SEB	LBH	LGA	WGL; 19	MOS	ELK	VIR	IMS	PET; 5			55th	393	

=== Complete Bathurst 12 Hours results ===
Year	Team	Co-Drivers	Car	Class	Laps	Pos.	Class Pos.
2020	(Japan) Honda Racing Team JAS	(United States) Dane Cameron (Netherlands) Renger van der Zande	Honda NSX GT3 Evo	GT3 Pro	184	27th	14th

Sporting positions
Preceded by Bryan Sellers; Madison Snow	IMSA SportsCar Championship; GTD Champion; 2019; With: Trent Hindman	Succeeded by Mario Farnbacher; Matt McMurry
Preceded by Mario Farnbacher; Trent Hindman	IMSA SportsCar Championship; GTD Champion; 2020; With: Matt McMurry	Succeeded by Zach Robichon; Laurens Vanthoor
Preceded by Jan Heylen; Fred Poordad	GT World Challenge America; Pro-Am Champion; 2022; With: Ashton Harrison	Succeeded by Colin Braun; George Kurtz
