= Robin Liddell =

Scottish racing driver

- Nationality: Scottish
- Born: 28 February 1974 (age 52) Edinburgh, Scotland

Michelin Pilot Challenge career
- Debut season: 2014
- Current team: Rebel Rock Racing
- Categorisation: FIA Gold (until 2018); FIA Silver (2019–)
- Car number: 71
- Former teams: Stevenson Motorsports

Previous series
- 2014–2017: WeatherTech SportsCar Championship

Championship titles
- 2015, 2023 2001: Michelin Pilot Challenge – GS class European Le Mans Series – GT class

Robin Liddell (born 28 February 1974) is a Scottish racing driver who currently competes in the Michelin Pilot Challenge.

== Career ==
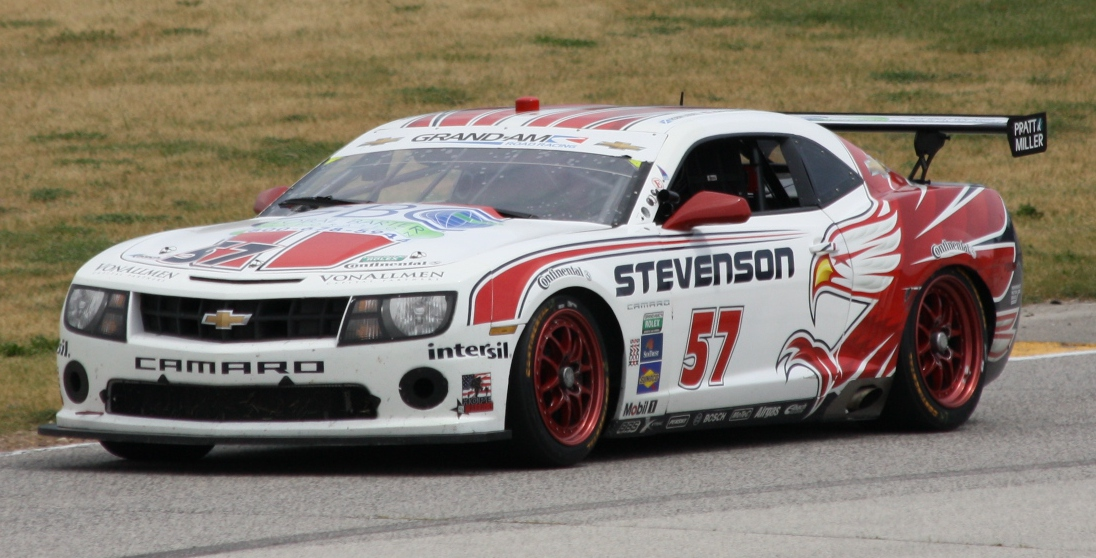
Liddell in action at Road America in 2012

Liddell has two series championships to his name, winning the GT class of the 2001 European Le Mans Series and the GS class of the 2015 Continental Tire Sports Car Challenge.

In 2014, Liddell joined Corvette Racing for the inaugural season of the United SportsCar Championship, lining up for the team at Daytona and Sebring. As the team's typical third drivers, Richard Westbrook and Jordan Taylor, were racing with General Motors' Daytona Prototype teams, Liddell and Ryan Briscoe were drafted in to serve as their temporary replacements. In 2018, Liddell took on a dual driver and team manager role with Michelin Pilot Challenge team Rebel Rock Racing, having driven for the team in previous years. The following season, in a race at Road America, Liddell edged out the McLaren of Kuno Wittmer to the line by seven hundredths of a second after Wittmer had inadvertently hit his pit limiter on the way to the finish.

== Racing record ==
=== Complete American Le Mans Series results ===
(key) (Races in bold indicate pole position)

Year	Team	Class	Make	Engine	1	2	3	4	5	6	7	8	9	10	11	12	Rank	Points	Ref
2001	P.K. Sport	GT	Porsche 911 GT3-RS	Porsche 3.6 L Flat-6	TEX	SEB	DON; 3	JAR; 5	SON	POR	MOS	MOH	LGA	PET			NC	0	
2002	P.K. Sport	GT	Porsche 911 GT3-RS	Porsche 3.6 L Flat-6	SEB; 3	SON	MOH	ELK	WAS	TRO	MOS	LGA	MIA	PET; 17			10th	43	
2003	P.K. Sport	GT	Porsche 911 GT3-RS	Porsche 3.6 L Flat-6	SEB; 21	ATL; 6	SON; 15	TRO; 13	MOS; 5	ELK; 14	LGA; 4	MIA; 3	PET; 8				6th	47	
2004	Intersport Racing	LMP2	Lola B2K/40	Judd KV675 3.4 L V8		MOH; 1	LIM	**SON**; 1	**POR**; 1	**MOS**; 1	ELK; 4	**PET**; 1	LGA; 1				2nd	129	
2004	P.K. Sport	GT	Porsche 911 GT3-RS	Porsche 3.6 L Flat-6	SEB; 15														
2005	Panoz Motorsports	GT2	Panoz Esperante GTLM	Ford (Elan) 5.0 L V8	SEB; 11	**ATL**; 1	MOH; 4	LIM; 8	SON; 5	POR; 4	ELK; 5	MOS; 8	PET; 9	LGA; 2			6th	85	
2006	Alex Job Racing	GT2	Porsche 911 GT3-RSR	Porsche 3.6 L Flat-6	SEB	HOU	MOH	LIM	MIL	POR; 7	ELK	MOS	PET; 8	LGA			38th	13	
2007	Tafel Racing	GT2	Porsche 911 GT3-RSR	Porsche 3.8 L Flat-6	SEB; 3	STP; 5	LBH; 4	HOU; 3	UTA; 3	LIM; 10	MOH; 9	ELK; 3	MOS; 6	DET; 11	PET	LGA	10th	85	
2013	Risi Competizione	GT	Ferrari 458 Italia GT2	Ferrari 4.5 L V8	SEB	LBH	LGA	LIM	MOS	ELK	BAL	COT	VIR	**PET**; 3			24th	17	

=== Complete Grand-Am Rolex Sports Car Series results ===
(key) (Races in bold indicate pole position)

Year	Team	Class	Make	Engine	1	2	3	4	5	6	7	8	9	10	11	12	13	14	Rank	Points	Ref
2004	Orbit Racing	GT	Porsche GT3-RS	Porsche 3.6 L Flat-6	DAY; 1	MIA	PHO		WGL	DAY	MOH	WGL	MIA	VIR	BAR	CAL					
2004	G&W Motorsports	GT	Porsche GT3-RS	Porsche 3.6 L Flat-6				MON; 5													
2005	Tafel Racing	GT	Porsche GT3-RS	Porsche 3.6 L Flat-6	DAY; 4	MIA	CAL	LGA	MON	WGL; 4	DAY	BAR	WGL	MOH	PHO	WGL	VIR	MEX			
2006	Tafel Racing	GT	Porsche GT3 Cup	Porsche 3.6 L Flat-6	DAY; 6	MEX; 4	**MIA**; 3	**VIR**; 4	LGA; 1	PHO; 4	LIM; 3	WGL; 1	MOH; 1	DAY; 2	BAR; 2	**SON**; 1	**MIL**; 2		2nd	498	
2007	Tafel Racing	GT	Porsche GT3 Cup	Porsche 3.6 L Flat-6	DAY; 18	MEX	MIA	VIR	LGA	LIM	WGL; 19	MOH	DAY	IOW	BAR	MON	MIL				
2008	Stevenson Motorsports	GT	Pontiac GXP.R	Pontiac 6.0 L V8	DAY; 9	MIA; 24	MEX; 1	VIR; 1	LGA; 17	LIM; 3	WGL; 2	MOH; 2	DAY; 3	BAR; 4	MON; 1	JER; 2	MIL; 2		2nd	364	
2009	Stevenson Motorsports	GT	Pontiac GXP.R	Pontiac 6.0 L V8	DAY; 6	VIR; 1	JER; 5	LGA; 6	WGL; 8	MOH; 2	DAY; 16	BAR; 1	WGL; 4	MON; 1	MIL; 7	MIA; 2			8th	289	
2010	Stevenson Motorsports	GT	Chevrolet Camaro GT.R	GM LS3 6.0 L V8	DAY; 4	MIA; 2	BAR; 4	VIR; 7	LIM; 12	WGL; 9	MOH; 5	DAY; 3	JER; 7	WGL; 14	MON; 3	MIL; 1			4th	315	
2011	Stevenson Motorsports	GT	Chevrolet Camaro GT.R	GM LS3 6.0 L V8	DAY; 12	**MIA**; 16	BAR; 9	**VIR**; 7	**LIM**; 1	WGL; 15	ELK; 12	LGA; 4	JER; 5	WGL; 20	MON; 1	**MOH**; 1			9th	285	
2012	Stevenson Motorsports	GT	Chevrolet Camaro GT.R	GM LS3 6.0 L V8	DAY; 4	BAR; 7	MIA; 3	**JER**; 2	DET; 3	**MOH**; 3	ELK; 6	WGL; 1	IMS; 15	WGL; 14	**MON**; 1	LGA; 8	**LIM**; 1		2nd	360	
2013	Stevenson Motorsports	GT	Chevrolet Camaro GT.R	GM LS3 6.0 L V8	DAY; 23	COT; 15	**BAR**; 1	ATL; 1	DET; 1	**MOH**; 10	**WGL**; 1	IMS; 2	ELK; 8	KAN; 4	**LGA**; 7	LIM; 4			3rd	330	

=== Complete WeatherTech SportsCar Championship results ===
(key) (Races in bold indicate pole position)

Year	Team	Class	Make	Engine	1	2	3	4	5	6	7	8	9	10	11	12	Rank	Points	Ref
2014	Corvette Racing	GTLM	Chevrolet Corvette C7.R	Chevrolet 5.5 L V8	DAY; 5	SEB; 6	LBH	LGA	WGL	MOS	IND	ELK	VIR	COA	PET		25th	53	
2016	Stevenson Motorsports	GTD	Audi R8 LMS GT3	Audi 5.2 L V10	DAY; 14	SEB; 8	LGA; 4	DET; 5	WGL; 11	MOS; 2	LIM; 2	ELK; 5	VIR; 3	COT; 10	PET; 7		4th	290	
2017	Stevenson Motorsports	GTD	Audi R8 LMS GT3	Audi 5.2 L V10	DAY; 4	SEB	LBH	AUS	BEL	WGL	MOS	LIM	ELK	VIR	LGA	PET	58th	9	

=== Complete 24 Hours of Le Mans results ===
Year	Team	Co-Drivers	Car	Class	Laps	Pos.	Class Pos.
2002	(United Kingdom) P.K. Sport Ltd.	(United Kingdom) David Warnock (United Kingdom) Piers Masarati	Porsche 911 GT3-RS	GT	83	DNF	DNF
2003	(United Kingdom) P.K. Sport Ltd.	(United Kingdom) David Warnock (United Kingdom) Piers Masarati	Porsche 996 GT3-RS	GT	285	23rd	6th
2005	(United States) Panoz Motor Sports	(United States) Bill Auberlen (United Kingdom) Scott Maxwell	Panoz Esperante GTLM	GT2	27	DNF	DNF
2007	(United Kingdom) Team Bruichladdich Radical	(United Kingdom) Tim Greaves (United Kingdom) Stuart Moseley	Radical SR9	LMP2	16	DNF	DNF
