= 2013 Championship Weekend =

Track map of Lime Rock Park

The 2013 Championship Weekend was the twelfth and final race of 2013 Rolex Sports Car Series season. It took place at Lime Rock Park on September 28, 2013.

== Entry list ==
Entry List
No.	Team	Car	Driver 1	Driver 2	Driver 3
DP
01	Chip Ganassi Racing with Felix Sabates	Riley-BMW	(United States) Scott Pruett	(Mexico) Memo Rojas	
2	Starworks Motorsport	Riley-BMW	(United Kingdom) Ryan Dalziel	(Venezuela) Alex Popow	
3	8Star Motorsports	Corvette DP	(Venezuela) Enzo Potolicchio	(Canada) Michael Valiante	(France) Stéphane Sarrazin
4	8Star Motorsports	Corvette DP	(Venezuela) Emilio DiGuida	(France) Sébastien Bourdais	
5	Action Express Racing	Corvette DP	(Brazil) Christian Fittipaldi	(Portugal) João Barbosa	
6	Michael Shank Racing	Riley-Ford	(Colombia) Gustavo Yacamán	(United Kingdom) Justin Wilson	
8	Starworks Motorsport	Riley-BMW	(United States) Scott Mayer	(New Zealand) Brendon Hartley	
9	Action Express Racing	Corvette DP	(United States) Brian Frisselle	(United States) Burt Frisselle	
10	Wayne Taylor Racing	Corvette DP	(Italy) Max Angelelli	(United States) Jordan Taylor	
42	Team Sahlen	Riley-BMW	(United States) Dane Cameron	(United States) Wayne Nonnamaker	
43	Team Sahlen	Riley-BMW	(United States) Joe Nonnamaker	(United States) Will Nonnamaker	
50	Highway to Help	Riley-BMW	(United States) Byron DeFoor	(United States) Jim Pace	
60	Michael Shank Racing	Riley-Ford	(Brazil) Oswaldo Negri Jr.	(United States) John Pew	
90	Spirit of Daytona Racing	Corvette DP	(United States) Ricky Taylor	(United Kingdom) Richard Westbrook	
99	GAINSCO/Bob Stallings Racing	Corvette DP	(United States) Jon Fogarty	(United States) Alex Gurney	
GT
18	Mühlner Motorsports America	Porsche 911 GT3 Cup	(Canada) Kyle Marcelli	(United States) Bob Doyle	
19	Mühlner Motorsports America	Porsche 911 GT3 Cup	(Austria) Richard Lietz	(United States) Mark Greenberg	
31	Marsh Racing	Chevrolet Corvette	(United States) Eric Curran	(United States) Lawson Aschenbach	
44	Magnus Racing	Porsche 911 GT3 Cup	(United States) John Potter	(United States) Andy Lally	
46	Fall-Line Motorsports	Audi R8 Grand-Am	(United States) Al Carter	(United States) Eric Lux	
57	Stevenson Motorsports	Chevrolet Camaro GT.R	(United States) John Edwards	(Scotland) Robin Liddell	
61	R.Ferri/AIM Motorsport Racing with Ferrari	Ferrari 458 Italia Grand-Am	(Canada) Alex Tagliani	(United States) Jeff Segal	
63	Scuderia Corsa	Ferrari 458 Italia Grand-Am	(Italy) Alessandro Balzan	(United States) Leh Keen	
64	Scuderia Corsa	Ferrari 458 Italia Grand-Am	(United States) Johannes van Overbeek	(United States) Jeff Westphal	
66	TRG-AMR	Aston Martin V12 Vantage	(Republic of Ireland) Damien Faulkner	(New Zealand) Richie Stanaway	
69	AIM Autosport Team FXDD with Ferrari	Ferrari 458 Italia Grand-Am	(United States) Emil Assentato	(United States) Anthony Lazzaro	
73	Park Place Motorsports	Porsche 911 GT3 Cup	(United States) Patrick Lindsey	(United States) Patrick Long	
75	Stevenson Motorsports	Chevrolet Camaro GT.R	(Spain) Antonio Garcia	(Denmark) Jan Magnussen	
93	Turner Motorsports	BMW M3	(United States) Michael Marsal	(United Kingdom) Tom Kimber-Smith	
94	Turner Motorsports	BMW M3	(Canada) Paul Dalla Lana	(United States) Bill Auberlen	
GX
00	Visit Florida Racing/Speedsource	Mazda6 GX	(United States) Joel Miller	(United States) Tristan Nunez	
11	SDR/Lotus Racing	Lotus Evora GX	(United States) Scott Dollahite	(United States) Bill Dollahite	
38	BGB Motorsports	Porsche Cayman GX.R	(United States) Jim Norman	(United States) Spencer Pumpelly	
70	Mazdaspeed/Speedsource	Mazda6 GX	(United States) Tom Long	(Canada) Sylvain Tremblay	

== Qualifying ==
=== Qualifying Results ===
Pole positions in each class are denoted in bold.

Pos	Class	No.	Team	Car	Qualifying	Grid
1	**DP**	**42**	**Team Sahlen**	**Riley / BMW**	**48.795**	**1**
2	DP	5	Action Express Racing	Corvette DP	49.204	2
3	DP	99	GAINSCO/Bob Stallings Racing	Corvette DP	49.229	3
4	DP	6	Michael Shank Racing	Riley / Ford	49.360	4
5	DP	10	Wayne Taylor Racing	Corvette DP	49.397	5
6	DP	9	Action Express Racing	Corvette DP	49.466	6
7	DP	01	Chip Ganassi Racing with Felix Sabates	Riley / BMW	49.479	14
8	DP	2	Starworks Motorsport	Riley / Ford	49.686	7
9	DP	3	8 Star Motorsports	Corvette DP	49.878	8
10	DP	60	Michael Shank Racing	Riley / Ford	50.961	9
11	DP	8	Starworks Motorsport	Riley / BMW	52.256	10
12	DP	4	8 Star Motorsports	Corvette DP	52.513	11
13	DP	43	Team Sahlen	Riley / BMW	53.160	12
14	**GT**	**31**	**Marsh Racing**	**Chevrolet Corvette**	**53.404**	**15**
15	GT	63	Scuderia Corsa	Ferrari 458 Italia Grand-Am	53.631	16
16	GT	57	Stevenson Motorsports	Chevrolet Camaro GT.R	53.812	17
17	GT	61	R. Ferri/AIM Motorsport Racing with Ferrari	Ferrari 458 Italia Grand-Am	53.980	18
18	GT	75	Stevenson Motorsports	Chevrolet Camaro GT.R	54.061	19
19	GT	64	Scuderia Corsa	Ferrari 458 Italia Grand-Am	54.200	20
20	GT	94	Turner Motorsport	BMW M3	54.513	21
21	GT	73	Park Place Motorsports	Porsche 911 GT3 Cup	54.574	22
22	GT	69	AIM Autosport Team FXDD with Ferrari	Ferrari 458 Italia Grand-Am	54.666	23
23	GT	66	TRG-AMR	Aston Martin V12 Vantage	54.991	24
24	GT	44	Magnus Racing	Porsche 911 GT3 Cup	55.177	25
25	GT	46	Fall-Line Motorsports	Audi R8 Grand-Am	55.331	26
26	GT	93	Turner Motorsport	BMW M3	55.680	27
27	**GX**	**70**	**Mazdaspeed/Speedsource**	**Mazda6 GX**	**56.916**	**29**
28	GX	11	SDR/Lotus Racing	Lotus Evora GX	56.979	30
29	GT	19	Mühlner Motorsports America	Porsche 911 GT3 Cup	57.022	28
30	GX	00	Visit Florida Racing/Speedsource	Mazda6 GX	57.179	31
31	GT	18	Mühlner Motorsports America	Porsche 911 GT3 Cup	58.093	33
32	GX	38	BGB Motorsports	Porsche Cayman GX.R	59.848	32
33	DP	90	Spirit of Daytona Racing	Corvette DP	No time	13

== Race ==
=== Race results ===
Winners in each class are denoted in bold.

Pos.	Class	No.	Team	Drivers	Chassis	Laps
Pos.	Class	No.	Team	Drivers	Engine	Laps
1	**DP**	**10**	**(United States) Wayne Taylor Racing**	**(Italy) Max Angelelli** **(United States) Jordan Taylor**	**Corvette DP (Dallara)**	**173**
1	**DP**	**10**	**(United States) Wayne Taylor Racing**	**(Italy) Max Angelelli** **(United States) Jordan Taylor**	**Chevrolet 5.0L V8**	**173**
2	DP	6	(United States) Michael Shank Racing	(United Kingdom) Justin Wilson (Colombia) Gustavo Yacamán	Riley Mk. XXVI	173
2	DP	6	(United States) Michael Shank Racing	(United Kingdom) Justin Wilson (Colombia) Gustavo Yacamán	Ford 5.0L V8	173
3	DP	01	(United States) Chip Ganassi Racing with Felix Sabates	(United States) Scott Pruett (Mexico) Memo Rojas	Riley Mk. XXVI	173
3	DP	01	(United States) Chip Ganassi Racing with Felix Sabates	(United States) Scott Pruett (Mexico) Memo Rojas	BMW 5.0L V8	173
4	DP	42	(United States) Team Sahlen	(United States) Dane Cameron (United States) Wayne Nonnamaker	Riley Mk. XXVI	173
4	DP	42	(United States) Team Sahlen	(United States) Dane Cameron (United States) Wayne Nonnamaker	BMW 5.0L V8	173
5	DP	4	(United States) 8 Star Motorsports	(France) Sébastien Bourdais (Venezuela) Emilio DiGuida	Corvette DP (Coyote)	173
5	DP	4	(United States) 8 Star Motorsports	(France) Sébastien Bourdais (Venezuela) Emilio DiGuida	Chevrolet 5.0L V8	173
6	DP	60	(United States) Michael Shank Racing	(Brazil) Oswaldo Negri Jr. (United States) John Pew	Riley Mk. XXVI	173
6	DP	60	(United States) Michael Shank Racing	(Brazil) Oswaldo Negri Jr. (United States) John Pew	Ford 5.0L V8	173
7	DP	2	(United States) Starworks Motorsport	(Scotland) Ryan Dalziel (Venezuela) Alex Popow	Riley Mk. XXVI	173
7	DP	2	(United States) Starworks Motorsport	(Scotland) Ryan Dalziel (Venezuela) Alex Popow	BMW 5.0L V8	173
8	DP	9	(United States) Action Express Racing	(United States) Brian Frisselle (United States) Burt Frisselle	Corvette DP (Coyote)	173
8	DP	9	(United States) Action Express Racing	(United States) Brian Frisselle (United States) Burt Frisselle	Chevrolet 5.0L V8	173
9	DP	90	(United States) Spirit of Daytona Racing	(United States) Ricky Taylor (United Kingdom) Richard Westbrook	Corvette DP (Coyote)	171
9	DP	90	(United States) Spirit of Daytona Racing	(United States) Ricky Taylor (United Kingdom) Richard Westbrook	Chevrolet 5.0L V8	171
10	DP	3	(United States) 8 Star Motorsports	(Venezuela) Enzo Potolicchio (Canada) Michael Valiante (France) Stéphane Sarrazin	Corvette DP (Coyote)	170
10	DP	3	(United States) 8 Star Motorsports	(Venezuela) Enzo Potolicchio (Canada) Michael Valiante (France) Stéphane Sarrazin	Chevrolet 5.0L V8	170
11	DP	43	(United States) Team Sahlen	(United States) Joe Nonnamaker (United States) Will Nonnamaker	Riley Mk. XXVI	167
11	DP	43	(United States) Team Sahlen	(United States) Joe Nonnamaker (United States) Will Nonnamaker	BMW 5.0L V8	167
12	DP	99	(United States) GAINSCO/Bob Stallings Racing	(United States) Jon Fogarty (United States) Alex Gurney	Corvette DP (Riley XXVI)	163
12	DP	99	(United States) GAINSCO/Bob Stallings Racing	(United States) Jon Fogarty (United States) Alex Gurney	Chevrolet 5.0L V8	163
13	**GT**	**31**	**(United States) Marsh Racing**	**(United States) Eric Curran** **(United States) Lawson Aschenbach**	**Chevrolet Corvette**	**162**
13	**GT**	**31**	**(United States) Marsh Racing**	**(United States) Eric Curran** **(United States) Lawson Aschenbach**	**Chevrolet 6.2L V8**	**162**
14	GT	63	(United States) Scuderia Corsa	(Italy) Alessandro Balzan (United States) Leh Keen	Ferrari 458 Italia Grand-Am	162
14	GT	63	(United States) Scuderia Corsa	(Italy) Alessandro Balzan (United States) Leh Keen	Ferrari 4.5L V8	162
15	GT	64	(United States) Scuderia Corsa	(United States) Johannes van Overbeek (United States) Jeff Westphal	Ferrari 458 Italia Grand-Am	162
15	GT	64	(United States) Scuderia Corsa	(United States) Johannes van Overbeek (United States) Jeff Westphal	Ferrari 4.5L V8	162
16	GT	57	(United States) Stevenson Motorsports	(United States) John Edwards (Scotland) Robin Liddell	Chevrolet Camaro GT.R	161
16	GT	57	(United States) Stevenson Motorsports	(United States) John Edwards (Scotland) Robin Liddell	Chevrolet 6.2L V8	161
17	GT	93	(United States) Turner Motorsport	(United Kingdom) Tom Kimber-Smith (United States) Michael Marsal	BMW M3	161
17	GT	93	(United States) Turner Motorsport	(United Kingdom) Tom Kimber-Smith (United States) Michael Marsal	BMW 5.0L V8	161
18	DP	8	(United States) Starworks Motorsport	(New Zealand) Brendon Hartley (United States) Scott Mayer	Riley Mk. XXVI	160
18	DP	8	(United States) Starworks Motorsport	(New Zealand) Brendon Hartley (United States) Scott Mayer	Ford 5.0L V8	160
19	GT	75	(United States) Stevenson Motorsports	(Spain) Antonio Garcia (Denmark) Jan Magnussen	Chevrolet Camaro GT.R	160
19	GT	75	(United States) Stevenson Motorsports	(Spain) Antonio Garcia (Denmark) Jan Magnussen	Chevrolet 6.2L V8	160
20	GT	61	(United States) R. Ferri/AIM Motorsport Racing with Ferrari	(Canada) Alex Tagliani (United States) Jeff Segal	Ferrari 458 Italia Grand-Am	159
20	GT	61	(United States) R. Ferri/AIM Motorsport Racing with Ferrari	(Canada) Alex Tagliani (United States) Jeff Segal	Ferrari 4.5L V8	159
21	GT	19	(Belgium) Mühlner Motorsports America	(Austria) Richard Lietz (United States) Mark Greenberg	Porsche 911 GT3 Cup	156
21	GT	19	(Belgium) Mühlner Motorsports America	(Austria) Richard Lietz (United States) Mark Greenberg	Porsche 4.0L F6	156
22	**GX**	**70**	**(United States) Mazdaspeed/Speedsource**	**(United States) Tom Long** **(Canada) Sylvain Tremblay**	**Mazda6 GX**	**154**
22	**GX**	**70**	**(United States) Mazdaspeed/Speedsource**	**(United States) Tom Long** **(Canada) Sylvain Tremblay**	**Mazda 2.2L I4 Diesel**	**154**
23	GX	38	(United States) BGB Motorsports	(United States) Jim Norman (United States) Spencer Pumpelly	Porsche Cayman GX.R	152
23	GX	38	(United States) BGB Motorsports	(United States) Jim Norman (United States) Spencer Pumpelly	Porsche 3.8L F6	152
24	GT	73	(United States) Park Place Motorsports	(United States) Patrick Lindsey (United States) Patrick Long	Porsche 911 GT3 Cup	151
24	GT	73	(United States) Park Place Motorsports	(United States) Patrick Lindsey (United States) Patrick Long	Porsche 4.0L F6	151
25 DNF	GX	00	(United States) Visit Florida Racing/Speedsource	(United States) Joel Miller (United States) Tristan Nunez	Mazda6 GX	133
25 DNF	GX	00	(United States) Visit Florida Racing/Speedsource	(United States) Joel Miller (United States) Tristan Nunez	Mazda 2.2L I4 Diesel	133
26 DNF	GT	66	(United States) TRG-AMR	(Republic of Ireland) Damien Faulkner (New Zealand) Richie Stanaway	Aston Martin V12 Vantage	106
26 DNF	GT	66	(United States) TRG-AMR	(Republic of Ireland) Damien Faulkner (New Zealand) Richie Stanaway	Aston Martin 6.0L V12	106
27 DNF	GT	69	(United States) AIM Autosport Team FXDD with Ferrari	(United States) Emil Assentato (United States) Anthony Lazzaro	Ferrari 458 Italia Grand-Am	105
27 DNF	GT	69	(United States) AIM Autosport Team FXDD with Ferrari	(United States) Emil Assentato (United States) Anthony Lazzaro	Ferrari 4.5L V8	105
28 DNF	GT	46	(United States) Fall-Line Motorsports	(United States) Al Carter (United States) Eric Lux	Audi R8 Grand-Am	83
28 DNF	GT	46	(United States) Fall-Line Motorsports	(United States) Al Carter (United States) Eric Lux	Audi 5.2L V10	83
29	GT	44	(United States) Magnus Racing	(United States) Andy Lally (United States) John Potter	Porsche 911 GT3 Cup	67
29	GT	44	(United States) Magnus Racing	(United States) Andy Lally (United States) John Potter	Porsche 4.0L F6	67
30 DNF	DP	5	(United States) Action Express Racing	(Brazil) Christian Fittipaldi (Portugal) João Barbosa	Corvette DP (Coyote)	50
30 DNF	DP	5	(United States) Action Express Racing	(Brazil) Christian Fittipaldi (Portugal) João Barbosa	Chevrolet 5.0L V8	50
31 DNF	GT	94	(United States) Turner Motorsport	(Canada) Paul Dalla Lana (United States) Bill Auberlen	BMW M3	2
31 DNF	GT	94	(United States) Turner Motorsport	(Canada) Paul Dalla Lana (United States) Bill Auberlen	BMW 5.0L V8	2
32 DNF	GX	11	(United States) SDR/Lotus Racing	(United States) Scott Dollahite (United States) Bill Dollahite	Lotus Evora GX	1
32 DNF	GX	11	(United States) SDR/Lotus Racing	(United States) Scott Dollahite (United States) Bill Dollahite	Toyota 4.0L V8	1
33 DNS	GT	18	(Belgium) Mühlner Motorsports America	(Canada) Kyle Marcelli (United States) Bob Doyle	Porsche 911 GT3 Cup	0
33 DNS	GT	18	(Belgium) Mühlner Motorsports America	(Canada) Kyle Marcelli (United States) Bob Doyle	Porsche 4.0L F6	0

Preceded by 2013 Continental Tire Sports Car Festival	Rolex Sports Car Series; 2013	Succeeded by none
