= 2013 Continental Tire Sports Car Festival =

Sports Car Festival

Track map of Mazda Raceway Laguna Seca

The 2013 Continental Tire Sports Car Festival was the eleventh race of 2013 Rolex Sports Car Series season. It took place at Mazda Raceway Laguna Seca on September 8, 2013.

== Entry list ==
Entry List
No.	Team	Car	Driver 1	Driver 2	Driver 3
DP
01	Chip Ganassi Racing with Felix Sabates	Riley-BMW	(United States) Scott Pruett	(Mexico) Memo Rojas	
02	Chip Ganassi Racing with Felix Sabates	Riley-BMW	(New Zealand) Scott Dixon	(United Kingdom) Dario Franchitti	
2	Starworks Motorsport	Riley-BMW	(United Kingdom) Ryan Dalziel	(Venezuela) Alex Popow	
3	8Star Motorsports	Corvette DP	(Venezuela) Enzo Potolicchio	(Canada) Michael Valiante	(France) Stéphane Sarrazin
4	8Star Motorsports	Corvette DP	(Venezuela) Emilio DiGuida	(France) Sébastien Bourdais	
5	Action Express Racing	Corvette DP	(Brazil) Christian Fittipaldi	(Portugal) João Barbosa	
6	Michael Shank Racing	Riley-Ford	(Colombia) Gustavo Yacamán	(United Kingdom) Justin Wilson	
8	Starworks Motorsport	Riley-BMW	(United States) Scott Mayer	(New Zealand) Brendon Hartley	
9	Action Express Racing	Corvette DP	(United States) Brian Frisselle	(United States) Burt Frisselle	
10	Wayne Taylor Racing	Corvette DP	(Italy) Max Angelelli	(United States) Jordan Taylor	
42	Team Sahlen	Riley-BMW	(United States) Dane Cameron	(United States) Wayne Nonnamaker	
43	Team Sahlen	Riley-BMW	(United States) Joe Nonnamaker	(United States) Will Nonnamaker	
50	Highway to Help	Riley-BMW	(United States) Byron DeFoor	(United States) Jim Pace	
60	Michael Shank Racing	Riley-Ford	(Brazil) Oswaldo Negri Jr.	(United States) John Pew	
90	Spirit of Daytona Racing	Corvette DP	(United States) Ricky Taylor	(United Kingdom) Richard Westbrook	
99	GAINSCO/Bob Stallings Racing	Corvette DP	(United States) Jon Fogarty	(United States) Alex Gurney	
GT
03	Extreme Speed Motorsports	Ferrari 458 Italia Grand-Am	(United States) Mike Hedlund	(United States) Johannes van Overbeek	
18	Mühlner Motorsports America	Porsche 911 GT3 Cup	(Canada) Kyle Marcelli	(United States) Brian Wong	
31	Marsh Racing	Chevrolet Corvette	(United States) Eric Curran	(United States) Boris Said	
44	Magnus Racing	Porsche 911 GT3 Cup	(United States) John Potter	(United States) Andy Lally	
46	Fall-Line Motorsports	Audi R8 Grand-Am	(United States) Al Carter	(United States) Bryan Sellers	
57	Stevenson Motorsports	Chevrolet Camaro GT.R	(United States) John Edwards	(Scotland) Robin Liddell	
61	R.Ferri/AIM Motorsport Racing with Ferrari	Ferrari 458 Italia Grand-Am	(Canada) Alex Tagliani	(United States) Jeff Segal	
63	Scuderia Corsa	Ferrari 458 Italia Grand-Am	(Italy) Alessandro Balzan	(United States) Leh Keen	
66	TRG-AMR	Aston Martin V12 Vantage	(United States) Brandon Davis	(United Kingdom) Darren Turner	
69	AIM Autosport Team FXDD with Ferrari	Ferrari 458 Italia Grand-Am	(United States) Emil Assentato	(United States) Anthony Lazzaro	
71	Park Place Motorsports	Porsche 911 GT3 Cup	(United States) Charles Espenlaub	(United States) Charles Putman	
73	Park Place Motorsports	Porsche 911 GT3 Cup	(United States) Patrick Lindsey	(United States) Patrick Long	
93	Turner Motorsports	BMW M3	(United States) Michael Marsal	(United States) Billy Johnson	
94	Turner Motorsports	BMW M3	(Canada) Paul Dalla Lana	(United States) Bill Auberlen	
GX
00	Visit Florida Racing/Speedsource	Mazda6 GX	(United States) Joel Miller	(United States) Tristan Nunez	
11	SDR/Lotus Racing	Lotus Evora GX	(United States) Scott Dollahite	(United States) Jeff Mosing	
38	BGB Motorsports	Porsche Cayman GX.R	(United States) Jim Norman	(United States) Spencer Pumpelly	
70	Mazdaspeed/Speedsource	Mazda6 GX	(United States) Tom Long	(Canada) Sylvain Tremblay	

== Qualifying ==
=== Qualifying Results ===
Pole positions in each class are denoted in bold.

Pos	Class	No.	Team	Car	Qualifying	Grid
1	**DP**	**90**	**Spirit of Daytona Racing**	**Corvette DP**	**1:21.557**	**1**
2	DP	10	Wayne Taylor Racing	Corvette DP	1:21.578	2
3	DP	42	Team Sahlen	Riley / BMW	1:21.681	3
4	DP	02	Chip Ganassi Racing with Felix Sabates	Riley / BMW	1:21.833	4
5	DP	5	Action Express Racing	Corvette DP	1:21.900	5
6	DP	4	8 Star Motorsports	Corvette DP	1:21.931	16
7	DP	01	Chip Ganassi Racing with Felix Sabates	Riley / BMW	1:21.940	6
8	DP	99	GAINSCO/Bob Stallings Racing	Corvette DP	1:22.098	7
9	DP	2	Starworks Motorsport	Riley / Ford	1:22.116	8
10	DP	9	Action Express Racing	Corvette DP	1:22.254	9
11	DP	60	Michael Shank Racing	Riley / Ford	1:22.651	10
12	DP	6	Michael Shank Racing	Riley / Ford	1:22.682	11
13	DP	3	8 Star Motorsports	Corvette DP	1:22.967	12
14	DP	8	Starworks Motorsport	Riley / BMW	1:25.618	13
15	**GT**	**57**	**Stevenson Motorsports**	**Chevrolet Camaro GT.R**	**1:27.529**	**17**
16	GT	31	Marsh Racing	Chevrolet Corvette	1:27.628	18
17	DP	43	Team Sahlen	Riley / BMW	1:27.641	14
18	GT	63	Scuderia Corsa	Ferrari 458 Italia Grand-Am	1:27.683	19
19	GT	61	R. Ferri/AIM Motorsport Racing with Ferrari	Ferrari 458 Italia Grand-Am	1:27.713	20
20	GT	73	Park Place Motorsports	Porsche 911 GT3 Cup	1:27.880	21
21	GT	46	Fall-Line Motorsports	Audi R8 Grand-Am	1:28.194	22
22	DP	50	Highway To Help	Riley-BMW	1:28.829	15
23	GT	03	Extreme Speed Motorsports	Ferrari 458 Italia Grand-Am	1:28.867	23
24	GT	44	Magnus Racing	Porsche 911 GT3 Cup	1:29.013	24
25	GT	94	Turner Motorsport	BMW M3	1:29.033	25
26	GT	66	TRG-AMR	Aston Martin V12 Vantage	1:29.329	26
27	GT	93	Turner Motorsport	BMW M3	1:29.753	27
28	GT	18	Mühlner Motorsports America	Porsche 911 GT3 Cup	1:29.757	28
29	GT	69	AIM Autosport Team FXDD with Ferrari	Ferrari 458 Italia Grand-Am	1:29.790	29
30	GT	71	Park Place Motorsports	Porsche 911 GT3 Cup	1:31.336	30
31	**GX**	**00**	**Visit Florida Racing/Speedsource**	**Mazda6 GX**	**1:33.533**	**31**
32	GX	70	Mazdaspeed/Speedsource	Mazda6 GX	1:34.074	32
33	GX	38	BGB Motorsports	Porsche Cayman GX.R	1:36.843	33
34	GX	11	SDR/Lotus Racing	Lotus Evora GX	No time	34

== Race ==
=== Race results ===
Winners in each class are denoted in bold.

Pos.	Class	No.	Team	Drivers	Chassis	Laps
Pos.	Class	No.	Team	Drivers	Engine	Laps
1	**DP**	**10**	**(United States) Wayne Taylor Racing**	**(Italy) Max Angelelli** **(United States) Jordan Taylor**	**Corvette DP (Dallara)**	**105**
1	**DP**	**10**	**(United States) Wayne Taylor Racing**	**(Italy) Max Angelelli** **(United States) Jordan Taylor**	**Chevrolet 5.0L V8**	**105**
2	DP	01	(United States) Chip Ganassi Racing with Felix Sabates	(United States) Scott Pruett (Mexico) Memo Rojas	Riley Mk. XXVI	105
2	DP	01	(United States) Chip Ganassi Racing with Felix Sabates	(United States) Scott Pruett (Mexico) Memo Rojas	BMW 5.0L V8	105
3	DP	02	(United States) Chip Ganassi Racing with Felix Sabates	(New Zealand) Scott Dixon (United Kingdom) Dario Franchitti	Riley Mk. XXVI	105
3	DP	02	(United States) Chip Ganassi Racing with Felix Sabates	(New Zealand) Scott Dixon (United Kingdom) Dario Franchitti	BMW 5.0L V8	105
4	DP	99	(United States) GAINSCO/Bob Stallings Racing	(United States) Jon Fogarty (United States) Alex Gurney	Corvette DP (Riley XXVI)	105
4	DP	99	(United States) GAINSCO/Bob Stallings Racing	(United States) Jon Fogarty (United States) Alex Gurney	Chevrolet 5.0L V8	105
5	DP	4	(United States) 8 Star Motorsports	(France) Sébastien Bourdais (Venezuela) Emilio DiGuida	Corvette DP (Coyote)	105
5	DP	4	(United States) 8 Star Motorsports	(France) Sébastien Bourdais (Venezuela) Emilio DiGuida	Chevrolet 5.0L V8	105
6	DP	6	(United States) Michael Shank Racing	(United Kingdom) Justin Wilson (Colombia) Gustavo Yacamán	Riley Mk. XXVI	105
6	DP	6	(United States) Michael Shank Racing	(United Kingdom) Justin Wilson (Colombia) Gustavo Yacamán	Ford 5.0L V8	105
7	DP	5	(United States) Action Express Racing	(Brazil) Christian Fittipaldi (Portugal) João Barbosa	Corvette DP (Coyote)	105
7	DP	5	(United States) Action Express Racing	(Brazil) Christian Fittipaldi (Portugal) João Barbosa	Chevrolet 5.0L V8	105
8	DP	90	(United States) Spirit of Daytona Racing	(United States) Ricky Taylor (United Kingdom) Richard Westbrook	Corvette DP (Coyote)	105
8	DP	90	(United States) Spirit of Daytona Racing	(United States) Ricky Taylor (United Kingdom) Richard Westbrook	Chevrolet 5.0L V8	105
9	DP	42	(United States) Team Sahlen	(United States) Dane Cameron (United States) Wayne Nonnamaker	Riley Mk. XXVI	105
9	DP	42	(United States) Team Sahlen	(United States) Dane Cameron (United States) Wayne Nonnamaker	BMW 5.0L V8	105
10	DP	60	(United States) Michael Shank Racing	(Brazil) Oswaldo Negri Jr. (United States) John Pew	Riley Mk. XXVI	105
10	DP	60	(United States) Michael Shank Racing	(Brazil) Oswaldo Negri Jr. (United States) John Pew	Ford 5.0L V8	105
11	DP	9	(United States) Action Express Racing	(United States) Brian Frisselle (United States) Burt Frisselle	Corvette DP (Coyote)	105
11	DP	9	(United States) Action Express Racing	(United States) Brian Frisselle (United States) Burt Frisselle	Chevrolet 5.0L V8	105
12	DP	3	(United States) 8 Star Motorsports	(Venezuela) Enzo Potolicchio (Canada) Michael Valiante (France) Stéphane Sarrazin	Corvette DP (Coyote)	104
12	DP	3	(United States) 8 Star Motorsports	(Venezuela) Enzo Potolicchio (Canada) Michael Valiante (France) Stéphane Sarrazin	Chevrolet 5.0L V8	104
13	DP	2	(United States) Starworks Motorsport	(Scotland) Ryan Dalziel (Venezuela) Alex Popow	Riley Mk. XXVI	103
13	DP	2	(United States) Starworks Motorsport	(Scotland) Ryan Dalziel (Venezuela) Alex Popow	BMW 5.0L V8	103
14	DP	43	(United States) Team Sahlen	(United States) Joe Nonnamaker (United States) Will Nonnamaker	Riley Mk. XXVI	103
14	DP	43	(United States) Team Sahlen	(United States) Joe Nonnamaker (United States) Will Nonnamaker	BMW 5.0L V8	103
15	DP	50	(United States) Highway To Help	(United States) Byron Defoor (United States) Jim Pace	Riley Mk. XXVI	103
15	DP	50	(United States) Highway To Help	(United States) Byron Defoor (United States) Jim Pace	BMW 5.0L V8	103
16	**GT**	**44**	**(United States) Magnus Racing**	**(United States) Andy Lally** **(United States) John Potter**	**Porsche 911 GT3 Cup**	**101**
16	**GT**	**44**	**(United States) Magnus Racing**	**(United States) Andy Lally** **(United States) John Potter**	**Porsche 4.0L F6**	**101**
17	GT	93	(United States) Turner Motorsport	(United States) Billy Johnson (United States) Michael Marsal	BMW M3	100
17	GT	93	(United States) Turner Motorsport	(United States) Billy Johnson (United States) Michael Marsal	BMW 5.0L V8	100
18	GT	31	(United States) Marsh Racing	(United States) Eric Curran (United States) Boris Said	Chevrolet Corvette	100
18	GT	31	(United States) Marsh Racing	(United States) Eric Curran (United States) Boris Said	Chevrolet 6.2L V8	100
19	GT	73	(United States) Park Place Motorsports	(United States) Patrick Lindsey (United States) Patrick Long	Porsche 911 GT3 Cup	100
19	GT	73	(United States) Park Place Motorsports	(United States) Patrick Lindsey (United States) Patrick Long	Porsche 4.0L F6	100
20	GT	63	(United States) Scuderia Corsa	(Italy) Alessandro Balzan (United States) Leh Keen	Ferrari 458 Italia Grand-Am	100
20	GT	63	(United States) Scuderia Corsa	(Italy) Alessandro Balzan (United States) Leh Keen	Ferrari 4.5L V8	100
21	GT	69	(United States) AIM Autosport Team FXDD with Ferrari	(United States) Emil Assentato (United States) Anthony Lazzaro	Ferrari 458 Italia Grand-Am	100
21	GT	69	(United States) AIM Autosport Team FXDD with Ferrari	(United States) Emil Assentato (United States) Anthony Lazzaro	Ferrari 4.5L V8	100
22	GT	57	(United States) Stevenson Motorsports	(United States) John Edwards (Scotland) Robin Liddell	Chevrolet Camaro GT.R	100
22	GT	57	(United States) Stevenson Motorsports	(United States) John Edwards (Scotland) Robin Liddell	Chevrolet 6.2L V8	100
23	GT	18	(Belgium) Mühlner Motorsports America	(Canada) Kyle Marcelli (United States) Brian Wong	Porsche 911 GT3 Cup	100
23	GT	18	(Belgium) Mühlner Motorsports America	(Canada) Kyle Marcelli (United States) Brian Wong	Porsche 4.0L F6	100
24	GT	46	(United States) Fall-Line Motorsports	(United States) Al Carter (United States) Bryan Sellers	Audi R8 Grand-Am	100
24	GT	46	(United States) Fall-Line Motorsports	(United States) Al Carter (United States) Bryan Sellers	Audi 5.2L V10	100
25	GT	66	(United States) TRG-AMR	(United States) Brandon Davis (United Kingdom) Darren Turner	Aston Martin V12 Vantage	99
25	GT	66	(United States) TRG-AMR	(United States) Brandon Davis (United Kingdom) Darren Turner	Aston Martin 6.0L V12	99
26	DP	8	(United States) Starworks Motorsport	(New Zealand) Brendon Hartley (United States) Scott Mayer	Riley Mk. XXVI	98
26	DP	8	(United States) Starworks Motorsport	(New Zealand) Brendon Hartley (United States) Scott Mayer	Ford 5.0L V8	98
27	GT	71	(United States) Park Place Motorsports	(United States) Charles Espenlaub (United States) Charles Putman	Porsche 911 GT3 Cup	97
27	GT	71	(United States) Park Place Motorsports	(United States) Charles Espenlaub (United States) Charles Putman	Porsche 4.0L F6	97
28	**GX**	**70**	**(United States) Mazdaspeed/Speedsource**	**(United States) Tom Long** **(Canada) Sylvain Tremblay**	**Mazda6 GX**	**96**
28	**GX**	**70**	**(United States) Mazdaspeed/Speedsource**	**(United States) Tom Long** **(Canada) Sylvain Tremblay**	**Mazda 2.2L I4 Diesel**	**96**
29	GX	38	(United States) BGB Motorsports	(United States) Jim Norman (United States) Spencer Pumpelly	Porsche Cayman GX.R	96
29	GX	38	(United States) BGB Motorsports	(United States) Jim Norman (United States) Spencer Pumpelly	Porsche 3.8L F6	96
30	GT	94	(United States) Turner Motorsport	(Canada) Paul Dalla Lana (United States) Bill Auberlen	BMW M3	94
30	GT	94	(United States) Turner Motorsport	(Canada) Paul Dalla Lana (United States) Bill Auberlen	BMW 5.0L V8	94
31	GT	61	(United States) R. Ferri/AIM Motorsport Racing with Ferrari	(Canada) Alex Tagliani (United States) Jeff Segal	Ferrari 458 Italia Grand-Am	81
31	GT	61	(United States) R. Ferri/AIM Motorsport Racing with Ferrari	(Canada) Alex Tagliani (United States) Jeff Segal	Ferrari 4.5L V8	81
32	GX	11	(United States) SDR/Lotus Racing	(United States) Scott Dollahite (United States) Jeff Mosing	Lotus Evora GX	78
32	GX	11	(United States) SDR/Lotus Racing	(United States) Scott Dollahite (United States) Jeff Mosing	Lotus 4.0L V8	78
33	GX	00	(United States) Visit Florida Racing/Speedsource	(United States) Joel Miller (United States) Tristan Nunez	Mazda6 GX	76
33	GX	00	(United States) Visit Florida Racing/Speedsource	(United States) Joel Miller (United States) Tristan Nunez	Mazda 2.2L I4 Diesel	76
34 DNF	GT	03	(United States) Extreme Speed Motorsports	(United States) Mike Hedlund (United States) Johannes van Overbeek	Ferrari 458 Italia Grand-Am	14
34 DNF	GT	03	(United States) Extreme Speed Motorsports	(United States) Mike Hedlund (United States) Johannes van Overbeek	Ferrari 4.5L V8	14

Preceded by 2013 SFP Grand Prix	Rolex Sports Car Series; 2013	Succeeded by 2013 Championship Weekend
