= 2013 Rolex Sports Car Series =

14th season of the racing series organized by Grand-Am

Seasons
- ← 2012 2014 (USCC) →

The 2013 Rolex Sports Car Series season was the fourteenth and final season of the Grand American Road Racing Association's premier series, before merging up with the American Le Mans Series in 2014. It began on January 26, with the 51st running of the 24 Hours of Daytona.

As the NASCAR Holdings acquisition of Panoz Motor Sports, and IMSA, had already taken place, this season is technically one of two series that formed the 43rd season of the IMSA GT Championship that dates to 1971.

== Schedule ==
The schedule was released on September 28, 2012 and featured the addition of three new circuits for the series; Circuit of the Americas, Kansas Speedway, and Road Atlanta. Also, the August 10 event at Road America was a combined weekend with the American Le Mans Series, showcasing the organizations' recent merger. Previous races at Homestead-Miami Speedway, New Jersey Motorsports Park, Watkins Glen Short Course and Circuit Gilles Villeneuve did not return.

Rnd	Date	Race	Duration	Circuit	Location
1	January 26–27	Rolex 24 At Daytona	24 hours	Daytona International Speedway	Daytona Beach, Florida
2	March 2	Grand-Am of The Americas presented by GAINSCO and TOTAL	2 hours 45 minutes	Circuit of the Americas	Austin, Texas
3	April 6	Porsche 250	2 hours	Barber Motorsports Park	Birmingham, Alabama
4	April 20	Visual Studio Ultimate; Grand Prix of Atlanta	2 hours 45 minutes	Road Atlanta	Braselton, Georgia
5	June 1	Chevrolet Grand-Am Detroit 200	2 hours	The Raceway on Belle Isle	Detroit, Michigan
6	June 15	Diamond Cellar Classic	2 hours 45 minutes	Mid-Ohio Sports Car Course	Lexington, Ohio
7	June 30	Sahlen's Six Hours of The Glen	6 hours	Watkins Glen International	Watkins Glen, New York
8	July 26	Brickyard Grand Prix	3 hours	Indianapolis Motor Speedway (road course)	Speedway, Indiana
9	August 10	VisitFlorida.com Sports Car 250	2 hours 45 minutes	Road America	Elkhart Lake, Wisconsin
10	August 17	SFP Grand Prix	2 hours 45 minutes	Kansas Speedway	Kansas City, Kansas
11	September 8	Continental Tire Sports Car Festival	2 hours 45 minutes	Mazda Raceway Laguna Seca	Monterey, California
12	September 28	Championship Weekend presented by BMW	2 hours 45 minutes	Lime Rock Park	Lakeville, Connecticut

== News ==
- Lotus announced that they are developing a new Evora for the 2013 Rolex season.
- The series introduced a new alternative fueled "GX" class for the 2013 season. The vehicles also utilized new technologies not otherwise used in the series. Mazda announced that it would offer its SkyActiv-D diesel engine to teams for this new class. 2013 also marked the first season since 2004 to feature three classes.
- In September 2012, Grand Am tested Kansas Speedway in hopes of adding it to the 2013 schedule. The tests proved successful.

== Results ==
Overall winners in bold.

Rnd	Circuit	DP Winning Team	GT Winning Team	GX Winning Team	Report
Rnd	Circuit	DP Winning Drivers	GT Winning Drivers	GX Winning Drivers	Report
1	Daytona	**(United States) #01 Chip Ganassi Racing**	(United States) #24 Audi Sport customer racing/AJR	(United States) #16 Napleton Racing	Report
1	Daytona	**(United States) Charlie Kimball** **(Colombia) Juan Pablo Montoya** **(United States) Scott Pruett** **(Mexico) Memo Rojas**	(Portugal) Filipe Albuquerque (United Kingdom) Oliver Jarvis (Italy) Edoardo Mortara (South Africa) Dion von Moltke	(Venezuela) Nelson Canache (United States) David Donohue (United States) Shane Lewis (United States) Jim Norman	Report
2	Austin	**(United States) #99 GAINSCO/Bob Stallings Racing**	(United States) #94 Turner Motorsport	(United States) #38 BGB Motorsports	Report
2	Austin	**(United States) Jon Fogarty** **(United States) Alex Gurney**	(United States) Bill Auberlen (Canada) Paul Dalla Lana	(United States) Jim Norman (United States) Jeff Mosing (United States) Spencer Pumpelly	Report
3	Barber	**(United States) #10 Wayne Taylor Racing**	(United States) #57 Stevenson Motorsports	(United States) #38 BGB Motorsports	Report
3	Barber	**(Italy) Max Angelelli** **(United States) Jordan Taylor**	(United States) John Edwards (United Kingdom) Robin Liddell	(United States) Jim Norman (United States) Spencer Pumpelly	Report
4	Road Atlanta	**(United States) #01 Chip Ganassi Racing**	(United States) #57 Stevenson Motorsports	(United States) #00 Speedsource	Report
4	Road Atlanta	**(United States) Scott Pruett** **(Mexico) Memo Rojas**	(United States) John Edwards (United Kingdom) Robin Liddell	(United States) Andrew Carbonell (United States) Joel Miller	Report
5	Detroit	**(United States) #10 Wayne Taylor Racing**	(United States) #57 Stevenson Motorsports	(United States) #00 Speedsource	Report
5	Detroit	**(Italy) Max Angelelli** **(United States) Jordan Taylor**	(United States) John Edwards (United Kingdom) Robin Liddell	(United States) Joel Miller (United States) Tristan Nunez	Report
6	Mid-Ohio	**(United States) #5 Action Express Racing**	(United States) #94 Turner Motorsport	(United States) #70 Speedsource	Report
6	Mid-Ohio	**(Portugal) João Barbosa** **(Brazil) Christian Fittipaldi**	(United States) Bill Auberlen (Canada) Paul Dalla Lana	(United States) Tom Long (Canada) Sylvain Tremblay	Report
7	Watkins Glen	**(United States) #5 Action Express Racing**	(United States) #57 Stevenson Motorsports	(United States) #00 Speedsource	Report
7	Watkins Glen	**(Portugal) João Barbosa** **(Brazil) Christian Fittipaldi**	(United States) John Edwards (United Kingdom) Robin Liddell	(United States) Joel Miller (United States) Tristan Nunez (Japan) Yojiro Terada	Report
8	Indianapolis	**(United States) #2 Starworks Motorsport**	(United States) #61 R.Ferri/AIM Motorsport Racing with Ferrari	(United States) #70 Speedsource	Report
8	Indianapolis	**(United Kingdom) Ryan Dalziel** **(Venezuela) Alex Popow**	(United States) Jeff Segal (Italy) Max Papis	(United States) Tom Long (Canada) Sylvain Tremblay	Report
9	Road America	**(United States) #8 Starworks Motorsport**	(United States) #94 Turner Motorsport	(United States) #00 Speedsource	Report
9	Road America	**(New Zealand) Brendon Hartley** **(United States) Scott Mayer**	(United States) Bill Auberlen (Canada) Paul Dalla Lana	(United States) Joel Miller (United States) Tristan Nunez	Report
10	Kansas	**(United States) #10 Wayne Taylor Racing**	(United States) #63 Scuderia Corsa	(United States) #00 Speedsource	Report
10	Kansas	**(Italy) Max Angelelli** **(United States) Jordan Taylor**	(Italy) Alessandro Balzan (United States) Leh Keen	(United States) Joel Miller (United States) Tristan Nunez	Report
11	Laguna Seca	**(United States) #10 Wayne Taylor Racing**	(United States) #44 Magnus Racing	(United States) #70 Speedsource	Report
11	Laguna Seca	**(Italy) Max Angelelli** **(United States) Jordan Taylor**	(United States) Andy Lally (United States) John Potter	(United States) Tom Long (Canada) Sylvain Tremblay	Report
12	Lime Rock	**(United States) #10 Wayne Taylor Racing**	(United States) #31 Marsh Racing	(United States) #70 Speedsource	Report
12	Lime Rock	**(Italy) Max Angelelli** **(United States) Jordan Taylor**	(United States) Lawson Aschenbach (United States) Eric Curran (United States) Boris Said	(United States) Tom Long (Canada) Sylvain Tremblay	Report

== Championship standings ==
Championship points are awarded based on finishing positions as shown below. The exception is at the 24 Hours of Daytona, where a minimum of 15th place points are awarded so as not to excessively penalize a low finish when there are generally more entrants.

Position	1	2	3	4	5	6	7	8	9	10	11	12	13	14	15	16	17	18	19	20	21	22	23	24	25	26	27	28	29	30
Race	35	32	30	28	26	25	24	23	22	21	20	19	18	17	16	15	14	13	12	11	10	9	8	7	6	5	4	3	2	1

=== Daytona Prototypes ===
==== Drivers (Top 20) ====
Pos	Driver	R24	TXS	BIR	ATL	BEL	LEX	S6H	IMS	ELK	KAN	LGA	LIM	Points
1	(Italy) Max Angelelli	2	10	1	6	1	6	10	15	7	1	1	1	339
1	(United States) Jordan Taylor	2	10	1	6	**1**	**6**	10	**15**	7	1	1	1	339
2	(United States) Scott Pruett	**1**	3	4	1	12†	11	7	2	4	2	2	3	326
2	(Mexico) Memo Rojas	1	3	4	1	12†	11	7	2	4	**2**	2	3	326
3	(United States) Jon Fogarty	7	**1**	**2**	3	6	5	14	3	8	8	4	12	312
3	(United States) Alex Gurney	7	1	2	3	6	5	14	3	8	8	4	12	312
4	(Brazil) Christian Fittipaldi	8	5	11	12	2	1	1	14	2	4	7	14	308
5	(United Kingdom) Ryan Dalziel	6	2	6	2	3	3	8	1	14	11	13	7	308
5	(Venezuela) Alex Popow	6	2	6	2	3	3	8	1	14	11	13	7	308
6	(Portugal) João Barbosa	4	14	9	12	2	1	1	14	2	4	7	14	306
7	(United Kingdom) Richard Westbrook	5	11	3	5	5	9	9	6	13	12	**8**	9	279
7	(United States) Ricky Taylor	5	11	3	5	5	9	9	6	13	12	8	9	279
8	(United States) Brian Frisselle	8	5	11	8	11	7	5	16	3	5	11	8	276
9	(United States) Burt Frisselle	4	14	9	8	11	7	5	16	3	5	11	8	274
10	(United States) Dane Cameron	9	8	7	13	4	8	12	12	**10**	7	9	**4**	269
10	(United States) Wayne Nonnamaker	9	8	7	13	4	8	12	12	10	7	9	4	269
11	(Colombia) Gustavo Yacamán	13	7	5	4	7	13†	6	10	6	14	6	2	265
12	(New Zealand) Brendon Hartley	14	13	12	10	8	10	3	4	1	6	16		252
13	(France) Stéphane Sarrazin	10	4	10	9	10		2	8	12	9	12	10	249
14	(United States) John Pew	EX	16	8	7	13†	4	4	7	5	3	10	6	244
15	(Canada) Michael Valiante	13		8	7	13†	2	2	8	12	9	12	10	233
16	(United States) Will Nonnamaker	15	15	13	11	9	12	13	13	11	10	14	11	225
16	(United States) Joe Nonnamaker	15	15	13	11	9	12	13	13	11	10	14	11	225
17	(Brazil) Oswaldo Negri	EX	16				4	4	7	5	3	10	6	197
18	(France) Sébastien Bourdais	6						8	11	9	13	5	5	160
19	(United States) Scott Mayer	14	13†	12†	10	8†	10	3	4†	1	6†	16		139
20	(Venezuela) Enzo Potolicchio	10	4	10†			2†	2†	8†	12	9	12	10	130

Colour	Result
Gold	Winner
Silver	Second place
Bronze	Third place
Green	Points classification
Blue	Non-points classification
Blue	Non-classified finish (NC)
Purple	Retired, not classified (Ret)
Red	Did not qualify (DNQ)
Red	Did not pre-qualify (DNPQ)
Black	Disqualified (DSQ)
White	Did not start (DNS)
White	Withdrew (WD)
White	Race cancelled (C)
Blank	Did not practice (DNP)
Blank	Did not arrive (DNA)
Blank	Excluded (EX)

**Bold** - Pole position
Italics - Fastest lap

===== Notes =====
- Drivers denoted by † did not complete sufficient laps in order to score points.

==== Chassis ====
Pos	Chassis	R24	TXS	BIR	ATL	BEL	LEX	S6H	IMS	ELK	KAN	LGA	LIM	Points
1	(United States) Riley	**1**	**1**	**2**	1	3	3	3	1	**1**	**2**	2	**2**	393
2	(United States) Coyote	4	4	3	5	2	1	1	6	2	4	**5**	5	351
3	(Italy) Dallara	2	9	1	6	**1**	**6**	10	5	7	1	1	1	350
4	(United Kingdom) Lola		6											25

==== Engine ====
Pos	Engine	R24	TXS	BIR	ATL	BEL	LEX	S6H	IMS	ELK	KAN	LGA	LIM	Points
1	(United States) Chevrolet	2	**1**	**1**	3	**1**	**1**	1	3	2	1	**1**	1	404
2	(Germany) BMW	**1**	3	4	1	4	8	7	1	**1**	**2**	2	**3**	367
3	(United States) Ford	6	2	5	2	3	3	3	5	5	3	6	2	341

=== Grand Touring ===
==== Drivers (Top 20) ====
Pos	Driver	R24	TXS	BIR	ATL	BEL	LEX	S6H	IMS	ELK	KAN	LGA	LIM	Points
1	(Italy) Alessandro Balzan	4	**11**	2	3	2	6	5	5	6	1	3	2	341
2	(United States) Andy Lally	5	2	6	5	4	2	3	3	5	8	1	13	331
2	(United States) John Potter	5	2	6	5	4	2	3	3	5	8	1	13	331
3	(United States) John Edwards	23	15	**1**	1	1	**10**	1	2	8	4	**5**	4	330
3	(United Kingdom) Robin Liddell	23	15	1	1	1	10	**1**	2	8	4	5	4	330
4	(United States) Anthony Lazzaro	3	5	9	8	7	3	2	4	7	3	4	11	317
4	(United States) Emil Assentato	3	5	9	8	7	3	2	4	7	3	4	11	317
5	(United States) Patrick Long	16	4	8	2	6	4	8	11	2	2	9	9	303
5	(United States) Patrick Lindsey	16	4	8	2	6	4	8	11	2	2	9	9	303
6	(United States) Jeff Segal	21	10	4	6	3	8	11	1	4	6	13	7	293
7	(Canada) Paul Dalla Lana	18	1	5	7	10	1	4	12	1	7	12	14†	282
8	(United States) Leh Keen	13	3	10	4			2	5	**6**	1	3	2	277
9	(United States) Eric Curran	32	13	3	11	5	7	7	10	12	10	8	1	277
10	(United States) Boris Said	18	13	3	11	5	7	7	**10**	12	10	8		242
11	(United States) Bill Auberlen	18	1	5		10	1	4		1	7	12	14†	239
12	(United States) Michael Marsal	DNS	8	12†	12†	8	5	13		3	9	2	5	200
13	(Italy) Max Papis	21	10	4	6	**3**	8	11	1					198
14	(United States) Jeff Westphal			2	3	2	6	5					3	175
15	(United States) Billy Johnson	18			7		5	4	12		9	2		167
16	(South Africa) Dion von Moltke	1	9	7		9	11	9						145
17	(United States) Andrew Davis	13	3	10	4		9	16†	7					143
18	(United States) Johannes van Overbeek	9	7					6				14†	3	101
19	(United States) Al Carter	15						14	8			7	12	99
20	(United States) Bryan Sellers	13						8			5	7		91

Colour	Result
Gold	Winner
Silver	Second place
Bronze	Third place
Green	Points classification
Blue	Non-points classification
Blue	Non-classified finish (NC)
Purple	Retired, not classified (Ret)
Red	Did not qualify (DNQ)
Red	Did not pre-qualify (DNPQ)
Black	Disqualified (DSQ)
White	Did not start (DNS)
White	Withdrew (WD)
White	Race cancelled (C)
Blank	Did not practice (DNP)
Blank	Did not arrive (DNA)
Blank	Excluded (EX)

**Bold** - Pole position
Italics - Fastest lap

===== Notes =====
- Drivers denoted by † did not complete sufficient laps in order to score points.

==== Engine ====
Pos	Engine	R24	TXS	BIR	ATL	BEL	LEX	S6H	IMS	ELK	KAN	LGA	LIM	Points
1	(Italy) Ferrari	3	**5**	2	3	**2**	3	2	1	**4**	**1**	3	2	372
2	(Germany) Porsche	**5**	2	6	2	4	2	3	3	2	2	1	8	357
3	(United States) Chevrolet	23	13	**1**	1	1	**7**	**1**	**2**	8	4	**5**	**1**	334
4	(Germany) BMW	18	1	5	7	8	1	4	12	1	7	2	5	320
5	(Germany) Audi	1	16					9	8		5	7	12	164
6	(United Kingdom) Aston Martin											10	10	42
7	(Japan) Mazda	17												14
8	(United States) Dodge	33												0

=== GX Class ===
==== Drivers ====
Pos	Driver	R24	TXS	BIR	ATL	BEL	LEX	S6H	IMS	ELK	KAN	LGA	LIM	Points
1	(United States) Jim Norman	1	**1**	1	2	2	2	2	2	2	2	2	2	393
2	(United States) Joel Miller	6	3	2	1	1	3	1	3	1	1	4	3	380
3	(Canada) Sylvain Tremblay	4	2	3	3	3	1	**3**	1	3	3	1	1	380
3	(United States) Tom Long	4	2	**3**	3	**3**	**1**	3	**1**	**3**	**3**	1	**1**	380
4	(United States) Tristan Nunez	6	3	2		1	3	1	3	1	1	**4**	3	345
5	(United States) Spencer Pumpelly		1	1		2	2	2	2	2	2	2	2	326
6	(United States) Jeff Mosing	3	1									3		95
7	(United States) Andrew Carbonell	5			1			3						91
8	(United States) David Donohue	1			2									67
9	(United States) Shane Lewis	**1**												35
9	(Venezuela) Nelson Canache	1												35
10	(United States) James Clay	2												32
10	(United States) Seth Thomas	2												32
10	(Hong Kong) Darryl O'Young	2												32
10	(United States) Daniel Rogers	2												32
10	(Canada) Karl Thomson	2												32
11	(United States) Scott Dollahite											3	4†	30
12	(United States) Lee Davis	3												30
12	(United States) Ryan Eversley	3												30
12	(United States) Eric Foss	3												30
12	(United States) John Tecce	3												30
13	(United States) Derek Whitis	5												26
14	(France) Tristan Vautier	6												25

Colour	Result
Gold	Winner
Silver	Second place
Bronze	Third place
Green	Points classification
Blue	Non-points classification
Blue	Non-classified finish (NC)
Purple	Retired, not classified (Ret)
Red	Did not qualify (DNQ)
Red	Did not pre-qualify (DNPQ)
Black	Disqualified (DSQ)
White	Did not start (DNS)
White	Withdrew (WD)
White	Race cancelled (C)
Blank	Did not practice (DNP)
Blank	Did not arrive (DNA)
Blank	Excluded (EX)

**Bold** - Pole position
Italics - Fastest lap

===== Notes =====
- Drivers denoted by † did not complete sufficient laps in order to score points.

==== Engine ====
Pos	Engine	R24	TXS	BIR	ATL	BEL	LEX	S6H	IMS	ELK	KAN	LGA	LIM	Points
1	(Japan) Mazda	4	2	**2**	1	**1**	**1**	**1**	**1**	**1**	**1**	**1**	**1**	407
2	(Germany) Porsche	**1**	**1**	1	2	2	2	2	2	2	2	2	2	393
3	(United Kingdom) Lotus											3	4	58
