= Wayne Taylor Racing =

American auto racing team

(United States) Wayne Taylor Racing
- Founded: 2004; 22 years ago
- Base: Brownsburg, Indiana
- Team principal(s): Wayne Taylor (Owner; Team Principal); TWG Motorsports (Owner); Travis Houge (VP, General Manager); Brian Pillar (Technical Director)
- Current series: IMSA SportsCar Championship
- Former series: Rolex Sports Car Series
- Current drivers: IMSA SportsCar Championship; 10. (Portugal) Filipe Albuquerque (United Kingdom) Will Stevens (United States) Ricky Taylor; 40. (Switzerland) Louis Delétraz (United States) Colton Herta (United States) Jordan Taylor; 45. (United States) Graham Doyle (Costa Rica) Danny Formal (United States) Trent Hindman (Sweden) Marcus Ericsson
- Drivers' Championships: Rolex Sports Car Series: 2005, 2013; IMSA SportsCar Championship: 2017

Wayne Taylor Racing (WTR) is a sports car racing team that was founded in 2004 by racing driver Wayne Taylor. The team currently competes in the IMSA SportsCar Championship, campaigning the No. 10 DEX Imaging and HP sponsored Cadillac V-Series.R for Filipe Albuquerque and Ricky Taylor and the No. 40 DEX Imaging-sponsored Cadillac V-Series.R for Jordan Taylor and Louis Delétraz in the GTP class, and the No. 45 Lamborghini Huracán GT3 EVO2 for Kyle Marcelli, Danny Formal and Graham Doyle in the GTD class, also sponsored by DEX Imaging.

From 2023 to 2025, the team had a partnership with Andretti Autosport that also saw them rebrand as Wayne Taylor Racing with Andretti Autosport (WTRAndretti).

== History ==
Wayne Taylor Racing with Andretti Autosport Logo

The team was founded in 2004 as the Riley Technologies factory team, with title sponsorship from bank holding company SunTrust. The lineup of Wayne Taylor and Max Angelelli finished second in the Daytona Prototype teams championship in 2004 and won the Daytona Prototype team and driver championships in 2005.

For the 2007 season, Riley and Wayne Taylor split ways and Wayne Taylor Racing began to run the #10 SunTrust Racing entry. Wayne Taylor retired as a driver for the 2008 season and signed Michael Valiante as second driver; also the team switched to a Dallara chassis. In 2009, Ford engines were adopted and Brian Frisselle became the second driver.

For the 2010 season, Angelelli was joined by Ricky Taylor, son of Wayne Taylor. They collected a win and seven podiums, finishing runners-up. In 2011, SunTrust Racing switched to Chevrolet engines; they won three races and got eight podiums, resulting runners-up. After adopting the Corvette DP chassis, the duo got three wins in 2012 and resulted 6th in the drivers standings.

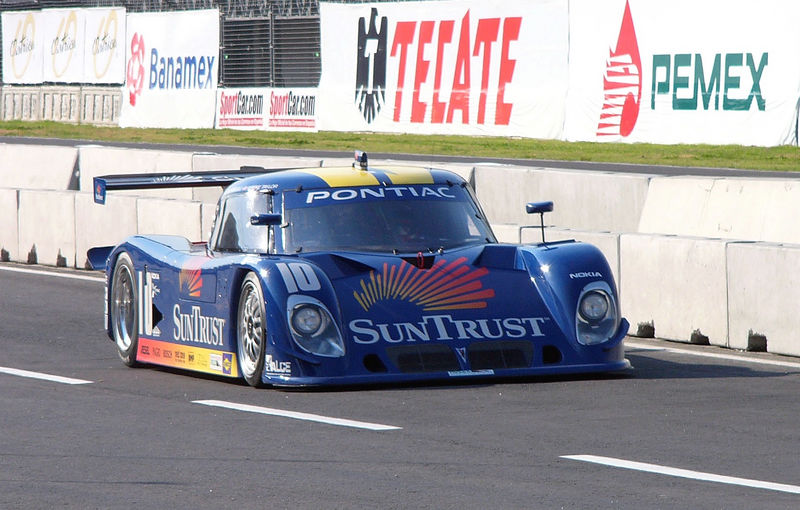
Suntrust Pontiac-Riley Daytona Prototype campaigned in 2005.

In 2013, Wayne Taylor Racing lost the SunTrust sponsorship. Ricky Taylor left the team, and was replaced by Jordan Taylor, also son of Wayne Taylor. Angelelli and Jordan Taylor would go on to win the final Daytona Prototype championship before the merger of Grand-Am and the American Le Mans Series in 2014, winning five races, including the final three.

For 2014, the first year of the United SportsCar Championship, Angelelli entered into semi-retirement, racing with the team for the endurance events. Ricky Taylor rejoined the team to drive full-time alongside brother Jordan.

Before the start of the 2023 IMSA WeatherTech SportsCar Championship season, Wayne Taylor Racing announced a partnership with Andretti Autosport, revealing that Andretti would play a role in the team's day-to-day operation and leadership going forward. They also stated that they have a longtime goal of moving into Andretti's new headquarters in 2025. WTR would retain Filipe Albuquerque and Ricky Taylor for the season, with Louis Delétraz driving in the Endurance cup races, and Brendon Hartley in the car for the 24 Hours of Daytona. Albuquerque and Taylor would finish the season 2nd in the standings, missing out on the championship after a controversial collision with championship rival Pipo Derani in the final hour of the race.

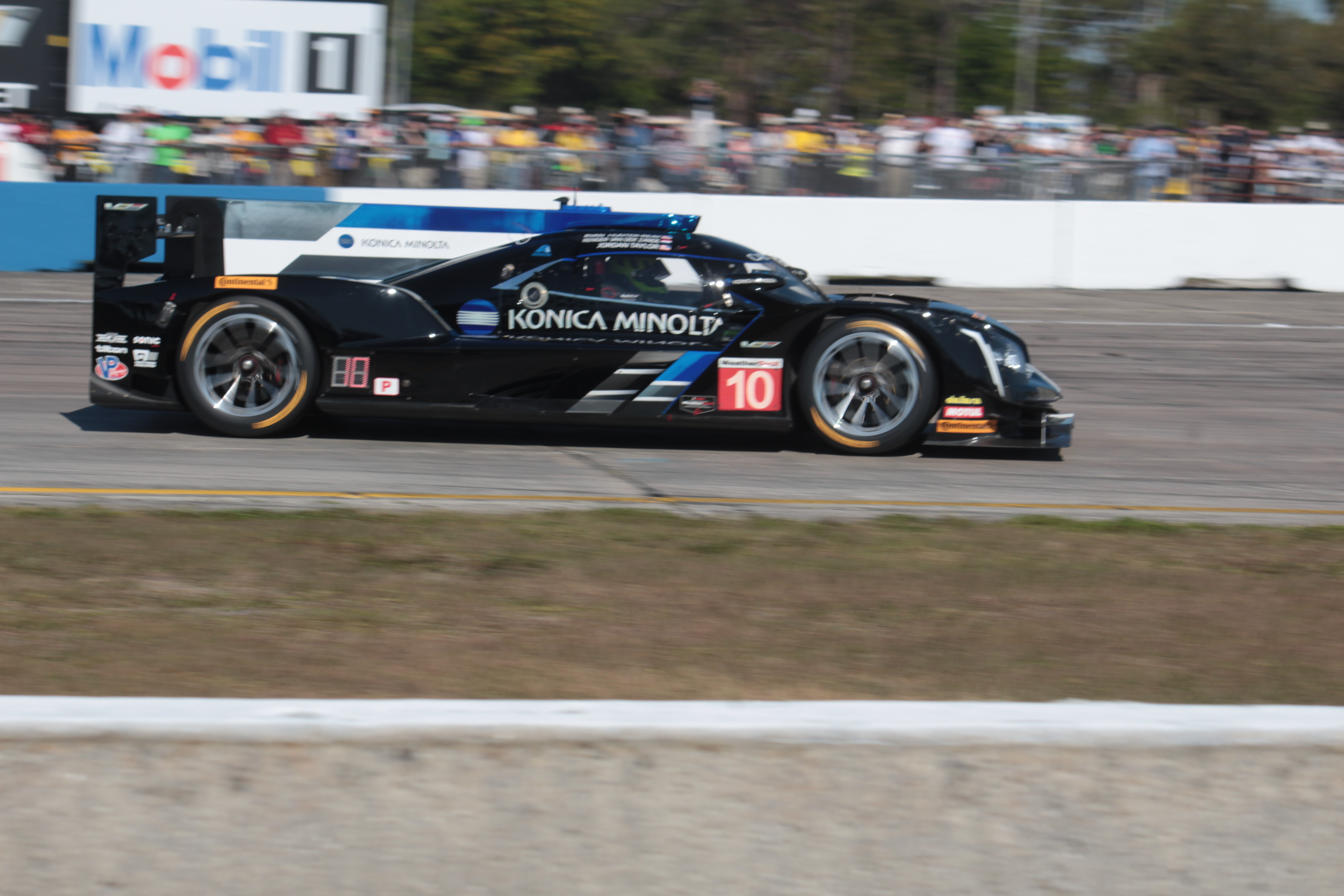
Jordan Taylor, Renger van der Zande, and Ryan Hunter-Reay sharing the team's Cadillac DPi-V.R at the 2018 12 Hours of Sebring.

With Meyer Shank Racing not participating in the 2024 IMSA season, Wayne Taylor Racing would expand their Acura GTP program to 2 cars, fielding the number 40 car full-time alongside the 10. Ricky Taylor and Filipe Albuquerque would remain the full time drivers for the 10 car, with Toyota driver Brendon Hartley driving in the Endurance Cup races, and IndyCar Series driver Marcus Ericsson being the fourth driver for the Rolex 24. In the 40 car, Jordan Taylor would leave a long time stint with the Corvette Racing GTD program to race full-time for his fathers team for the first time since 2019. Alongside Taylor, Louis Delétraz would be promoted to a full season drive. IndyCar driver Colton Herta, who had previously competed part-time in IMSA for BMW, would compete in the Endurance Cup rounds. Jenson Button would race in the Rolex 24, completing the lineup. Alongside their GTP entries, WTR would also field a Lamborghini Huracan GT3 Evo 2 in the GTD class full-time. The lineup would consist of Lamborghini Super Trofeo champions Kyle Marcelli and Danny Formal for full season driving duties, with Graham Doyle as the third driver and Ashton Harrison for the Rolex 24. The Racers Edge Motorsports team, who had partnered with Wayne Taylor Racing to field an Acura NSX GT3 Evo22 car part-time in 2023, would not return to the WeatherTech series in 2024. In 2025, WTR moved on from the Acura project and made the switch to Cadillac while retaining their GTD Lamborghini effort as before.

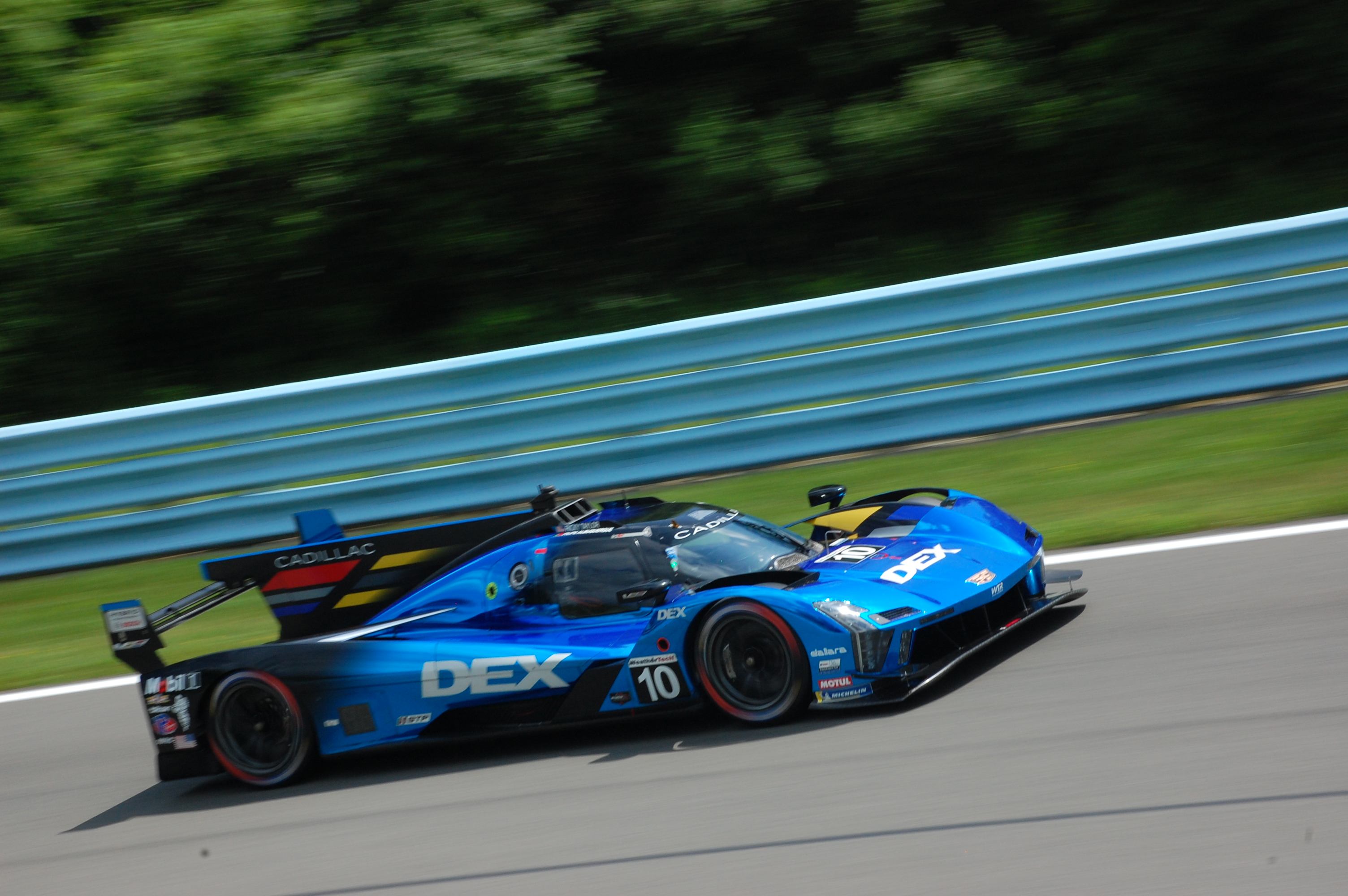
WTR's Cadillac V-Series.R GTP car, driven by Taylor and Albuquerque, during the 2025 Sahlen's Six Hours of The Glen

== Racing results ==
=== Rolex Sports Car Series ===
Year	Chassis	Engine	Drivers	No.	Class	1	2	3	4	5	6	7	8	9	10	11	12	13	Pos.	Pts.
2011						DAY	HOM	BAR	VIR	LIM	WGI	ROA	LAG	NJMP	WGI	CGV	MOH			
2011	Dallara Corvette DP	Chevrolet 5.5 L V8	(Italy) Max Angelelli (United States) Ricky Taylor	10	DP	5	3	11	4	1	1	3	3	2	1	2	11		2nd	353
2012						DAY	BAR	HOM	NJMP	DET	MOH	ROA	WGI	IMS	WGI	CGV	LAG	LIM		
2012	Dallara Corvette DP	Chevrolet 5.5 L V8	(Italy) Max Angelelli (United States) Ricky Taylor	10	DP	14	5	1	1	10	9	7	11	3	4	5	7	1	6th	343
2013						DAY	COTA	BAR	ATL	DET	MOH	WGI	IMS	ROA	KAN	LAG	LIM			
2013	Dallara Corvette DP	Chevrolet 5.5 L V8	(Italy) Max Angelelli (United States) Jordan Taylor	10	DP	2	10	1	6	1	6	10	15	7	1	1	1		1st	339

=== IMSA Sportscar Championship ===
Year	Chassis	Engine	Drivers	No.	Class	1	2	3	4	5	6	7	8	9	10	11	Pos.	Pts.
2014						DAY	SEB	LBH	LAG	DET	WGI	MOS	IMS	ROA	COTA	ATL		
2014	Dallara Corvette DP	Chevrolet 5.5 L V8	(United States) Ricky Taylor (United States) Jordan Taylor	10	P	2	7	2	2	1	5	3	4	10	7	1	2nd	330
2015						DAY	SEB	LBH	LAG	DET	WGI	MOS	ROA	COTA	ATL			
2015	Dallara Corvette DP	Chevrolet 5.5 L V8	(United States) Ricky Taylor (United States) Jordan Taylor	10	P	16	2	1	2	6	6	1	8	2	4		5th	292
2016						DAY	SEB	LBH	LAG	DET	WGI	MOS	ROA	COTA	ATL			
2016	Dallara Corvette DP	Chevrolet 5.5L V8	(United States) Ricky Taylor (United States) Jordan Taylor	10	P	2	12	1	6	1	4	3	3	1	3		3rd	309
2017						DAY	SEB	LBH	COTA	DET	WGI	MOS	ROA	LAG	ATL			
2017	Cadillac DPi-V.R	Cadillac 6.2 L V8	(United States) Ricky Taylor (United States) Jordan Taylor	10	DPi	1	1	1	1	1	6	7	2	3	9		1st	310
2018						DAY	SEB	LBH	MOH	DET	WGI	MOS	ROA	LAG	ATL			
2018	Cadillac DPi-V.R	Cadillac 5.5 L V8	(United States) Jordan Taylor (Netherlands) Renger van der Zande	10	DPi	15	2	3	5	5	5	2	4	12	1		3rd	270
2019						DAY	SEB	LBH	MOH	DET	WGI	MOS	ROA	LAG	ATL			
2019	Cadillac DPi-V.R	Cadillac 5.5 L V8	(United States) Jordan Taylor (Netherlands) Renger van der Zande	10	DPi	1	2	10	6	9	4	6	5	4	2		4th	274
2020						DAY	DAY	SEB	ROA	ATL	MOH	ATL	LAG	SEB				
2020	Cadillac DPi-V.R	Cadillac 5.5 L V8	(Netherlands) Renger van der Zande (Australia) Ryan Briscoe	10	DPi	1	6	2	2	5	3	1	6	7			2nd	264
2021						DAY	SEB	MOH	DET	WGI	WGI	ROA	LAG	LBH	ATL			
2021	Acura ARX-05	Acura AR35TT 3.5 L Turbo V6	(Portugal) Filipe Albuquerque (United States) Ricky Taylor	10	DPi	1	4	1	3	3	3	4	1	4	3		2nd	3396
2022						DAY	SEB	LBH	LGA	MOH	DET	WGL	MOS	ROA	PET			
2022	Acura ARX-05	Acura AR35TT 3.5 L Turbo V6	(Portugal) Filipe Albuquerque (United States) Ricky Taylor	10	DPi	2	4	6	1	1	4	1	6	1	6		2nd	3346
2023						DAY	SEB	LBH	LGA	WGL	MOS	ROA	IMS	PET				
2023	Acura ARX-06	Acura AR24e 2.4 L Hybrid Twin-Turbocharged V6	(Portugal) Filipe Albuquerque (United States) Ricky Taylor	10	GTP	2	4	7	4	6	2	3	5	9			2nd	2712
2024						DAY	SEB	LBH	LGA	DET	WGL	MOS	ROA	VIR	IMS	PET		
2024	Acura ARX-06	Acura AR24e 2.4 L Hybrid Twin-Turbocharged V6	(Portugal) Filipe Albuquerque (United States) Ricky Taylor	10	GTP	9	5	8	6	1	10		3		4	9	6th	2250
2024	Acura ARX-06	Acura AR24e 2.4 L Hybrid Twin-Turbocharged V6	(United States) Jordan Taylor (Switzerland) Louis Delétraz	40	GTP	3	1	9	4	5	4		8		11	7	5th	2603
2024	Lamborghini Huracán GT3 Evo 2	Lamborghini DGF 5.2 L V10	(Canada) Kyle Marcelli (Costa Rica) Danny Formal	45	GTD	17	15	8	5		12	6	15	11	10	5	7th	2310
2025						DAY	SEB	LBH	LGA	DET	WGL	MOS	ELK	VIR	IMS	PET		
2025	Cadillac V-Series.R	Cadillac LMC55R 5.5 L V8	(Portugal) Filipe Albuquerque (United States) Ricky Taylor	10	GTP	5	7	6	8	2	3		8		2	6	5th	2657
2025	Cadillac V-Series.R	Cadillac LMC55R 5.5 L V8	(United States) Jordan Taylor (Switzerland) Louis Delétraz	40	GTP	11	11	7	7	9	2		9		9	8	9th	2304
2025	Lamborghini Huracán GT3 Evo 2	Lamborghini DGF 5.2 L V10	(Costa Rica) Danny Formal (United States) Trent Hindman	45	GTD	10	14	11	8		20	1	5	13	14	12	10th	2274
2026*						DAY	SEB	LBH	LGA	DET	WGL	MOS	ELK	VIR	IMS	PET		
2026*	Cadillac V-Series.R	Cadillac LMC55R 5.5 L V8	(Portugal) Filipe Albuquerque (United States) Ricky Taylor	10	GTP	11	11	10	11	6	8		1				10th	1873
2026*	Cadillac V-Series.R	Cadillac LMC55R 5.5 L V8	(United States) Jordan Taylor (Switzerland) Louis Delétraz	40	GTP	6	7	8	10	3	7		3				9th	1923
2026*	Lamborghini Huracán GT3 Evo 2	Lamborghini DGF 5.2 L V10	(Costa Rica) Danny Formal (United States) Trent Hindman (United States) Graham Doyle	45	GTD	8	16	17	1		20	5	12				8th	1574

* Season still in progress.

=== 24 Hours of Le Mans ===
Year	Entrant	No.	Car	Drivers	Class	Laps	Pos.	Class Pos.
2025	(United States) Cadillac WTR	101	Cadillac V-Series.R	(Portugal) Filipe Albuquerque (United States) Jordan Taylor (United States) Ricky Taylor	Hypercar	189	DNF	DNF
2026	(United States) Cadillac WTR	101	Cadillac V-Series.R	(Portugal) Filipe Albuquerque (United States) Jordan Taylor (United States) Ricky Taylor	Hypercar	379	9th	9th

=== Notable race victories ===
- 24 Hours of Daytona – 2005, 2017, 2019, 2020, 2021
- 12 Hours of Sebring – 2017, 2024
- Petit Le Mans – 2014, 2018, 2020
- 6 Hours of Watkins Glen – 2011, 2016, 2022

=== IMSA SportsCar Championship wins ===
==== Overall wins ====
#	Season	Date	Classes	Track / Race	No.	Winning drivers	Chassis	Engine
1	2014	May 31	Prototype	Belle Isle	10	(United States) J. Taylor / (United States) R. Taylor	Dallara Corvette DP	Chevrolet 5.5 L V8
2	2014	October 4	Prototype	Road Atlanta	10	(Italy) Angelelli / (United States) J. Taylor / (United States) R. Taylor	Dallara Corvette DP	Chevrolet 5.5 L V8
3	2015	April 18	Prototype	Long Beach	10	(United States) J. Taylor / (United States) R. Taylor	Dallara Corvette DP	Chevrolet 5.5 L V8
4	2015	July 12	Prototype	Mosport	10	(United States) J. Taylor / (United States) R. Taylor	Dallara Corvette DP	Chevrolet 5.5 L V8
5	2016	April 16	Prototype	Long Beach	10	(United States) J. Taylor / (United States) R. Taylor	Dallara Corvette DP	Chevrolet 5.5 L V8
6	2016	June 4	Prototype	Belle Isle	10	(United States) J. Taylor / (United States) R. Taylor	Dallara Corvette DP	Chevrolet 5.5 L V8
7	2016	September 17	Prototype	Austin	10	(United States) J. Taylor / (United States) R. Taylor	Dallara Corvette DP	Chevrolet 5.5 L V8
8	2017	January 28–29	Prototype	Daytona	10	(Italy) Angelelli / (United States) Gordon / (United States) J. Taylor / (United States) R. Taylor	Cadillac DPi-V.R	Cadillac 6.2 L V8
9	2017	March 18	Prototype	Sebring	10	(United Kingdom) Lynn / (United States) J. Taylor / (United States) R. Taylor	Cadillac DPi-V.R	Cadillac 6.2 L V8
10	2017	April 8	Prototype	Long Beach	10	(United States) J. Taylor / (United States) R. Taylor	Cadillac DPi-V.R	Cadillac 6.2 L V8
11	2017	May 6	Prototype	Austin	10	(United States) J. Taylor / (United States) R. Taylor	Cadillac DPi-V.R	Cadillac 6.2 L V8
12	2017	June 3	Prototype	Belle Isle	10	(United States) J. Taylor / (United States) R. Taylor	Cadillac DPi-V.R	Cadillac 6.2 L V8
13	2018	October 13	Prototype	Road Atlanta	10	(United States) Hunter-Reay / (United States) J. Taylor / (Netherlands) van der Zande	Cadillac DPi-V.R	Cadillac 5.5 L V8
14	2019	January 26–27	(DPi)	Daytona	10	(Spain) Alonso / (Japan) Kobayashi / (United States) J. Taylor / (Netherlands) van der Zande	Cadillac DPi-V.R	Cadillac 5.5 L V8
15	2020	January 25–26	(DPi)	Daytona	10	(Australia) Briscoe / (New Zealand) Dixon / (Japan) Kobayashi / (Netherlands) van der Zande	Cadillac DPi-V.R	Cadillac 5.5 L V8
16	2020	October 17	(DPi)	Road Atlanta	10	(Australia) Briscoe / (New Zealand) Dixon / (Netherlands) van der Zande	Cadillac DPi-V.R	Cadillac 5.5 L V8
17	2021	January 30–31	(DPi)	Daytona	10	(Portugal) Albuquerque / (Brazil) Castroneves / (United States) Rossi / (United States) R. Taylor	Acura ARX-05	Acura AR35TT 3.5 L Turbo V6
18	2021	May 16	(DPi)	Mid-Ohio	10	(Portugal) Albuquerque / (United States) R. Taylor	Acura ARX-05	Acura AR35TT 3.5 L Turbo V6
19	2021	September 12	(DPi)	Laguna Seca	10	(Portugal) Albuquerque / (United States) R. Taylor	Acura ARX-05	Acura AR35TT 3.5 L Turbo V6
20	2022	May 1	(DPi)	Laguna Seca	10	(Portugal) Albuquerque / (United States) R. Taylor	Acura ARX-05	Acura AR35TT 3.5 L Turbo V6
21	2022	May 15	(DPi)	Mid-Ohio	10	(Portugal) Albuquerque / (United States) R. Taylor	Acura ARX-05	Acura AR35TT 3.5 L Turbo V6
22	2022	June 26	(DPi)	Watkins Glen	10	(Portugal) Albuquerque / (United States) R. Taylor	Acura ARX-05	Acura AR35TT 3.5 L Turbo V6
23	2022	August 7	(DPi)	Road America	10	(Portugal) Albuquerque / (United States) R. Taylor	Acura ARX-05	Acura AR35TT 3.5 L Turbo V6
24	2024	March 16	(GTP)	Sebring	40	(Switzerland) L. Delétraz / (United States) C. Herta / (United States) J. Taylor	Acura ARX-06	Acura AR24e 2.4 L Twin-turbo V6
25	2024	June 1	(GTP)	Detroit	10	(Portugal) Albuquerque / (United States) R. Taylor	Acura ARX-06	Acura AR24e 2.4 L Twin-turbo V6
26	2026	August 2	(GTP)	Road America	10	(Portugal) Albuquerque / (United States) R. Taylor	Cadillac V-Series.R	Cadillac LMC55R 5.5 L V8

==== Class wins ====
#	Season	Date	Classes	Track / Race	No.	Winning drivers	Chassis	Engine
1	2025	July 13	(GTD)	CTMP	45	(Costa Rica) Danny Formal / (United States) Trent Hindman	Lamborghini Huracán GT3 Evo 2	Lamborghini DGF 5.2 L V10
2	2026	May 3	(GTD)	Laguna Seca	45	(Costa Rica) Danny Formal / (United States) Trent Hindman	Lamborghini Huracán GT3 Evo 2	Lamborghini DGF 5.2 L V10
