= Jordan Taylor (racing driver) =

American racing driver (born 1991)

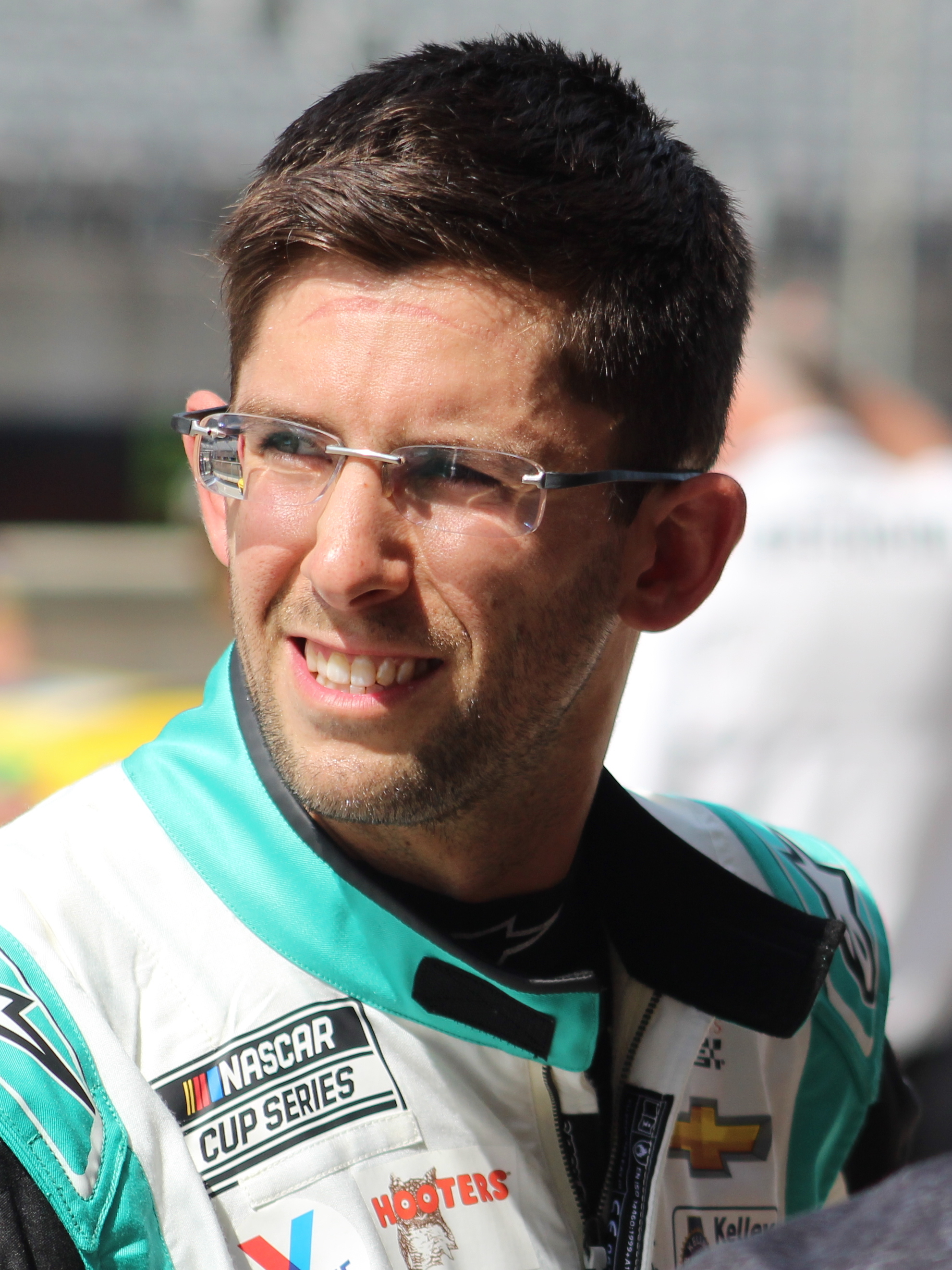
- Taylor at the Circuit of the Americas in 2023
- Nationality: (United States) American
- Born: Jordan Lee Taylor; May 10, 1991 (age 35) Orlando, Florida, U.S.
- Relatives: Ricky Taylor (brother); Wayne Taylor (father)

IMSA SportsCar Championship career
- Debut season: 2014
- Current team: Wayne Taylor Racing
- Categorisation: FIA Gold (until 2014); FIA Platinum (2015–)
- Car number: 40
- Starts: 131
- Championships: 3 2017 (P), 2020–2021 (GTLM)
- Wins: 27
- Podiums: 65
- Poles: 20
- Best finish: 1st in 2017 (P), 2020–2021 GTLM)
- Finished last season

NASCAR Cup Series career
- 1 race run over 1 year
- 2023 position: 53rd
- Best finish: 53rd (2023)
- First race: 2023 EchoPark Automotive Grand Prix (COTA)
Wins	Top tens	Poles
0	0	0

NASCAR O'Reilly Auto Parts Series career
- 2 races run over 1 year
- 2023 position: 55th
- Best finish: 55th (2023)
- First race: 2023 Pacific Office Automation 147 (Portland)
- Last race: 2023 Drive for the Cure 250 (Charlotte Roval)
Wins	Top tens	Poles
0	0	0

NASCAR FedEx Freight Truck Series career
- 1 race run over 1 year
- 2025 position: 46th
- Best finish: 46th (2025)
- First race: 2025 LiUNA! 150 (Lime Rock)
Wins	Top tens	Poles
0	0	0
- Statistics up to date as of October 31, 2025.

Jordan Lee Taylor (born May 10, 1991) is an American professional racing driver. He competes full-time in the IMSA WeatherTech SportsCar Championship, driving the No. 40 Cadillac V-Series.R for Wayne Taylor Racing. He won the 2017 24 Hours of Daytona (along with Jeff Gordon, Max Angelelli and brother Ricky Taylor) and the 2017 championship in the Prototype class of the WeatherTech SportsCar Championship.

Taylor also won the 2013 Rolex Sports Car Series Daytona Prototypes class, the 2017 Pirelli World Challenge SprintX GT Championship, and was 2014 United SportsCar Championship Prototypes class runner-up. As well, Taylor achieved a GTE-Pro class victory at the 2015 24 Hours of Le Mans in the Chevrolet Corvette C7.R.

Taylor is the youngest son of sports car veteran Wayne Taylor. He raced a Cadillac Prototype for his father's team, where he partnered with his older brother, Ricky, from 2014 to 2017. In 2018, he partnered with Renger van der Zande, as Ricky moved to Acura Team Penske.

== Racing career ==
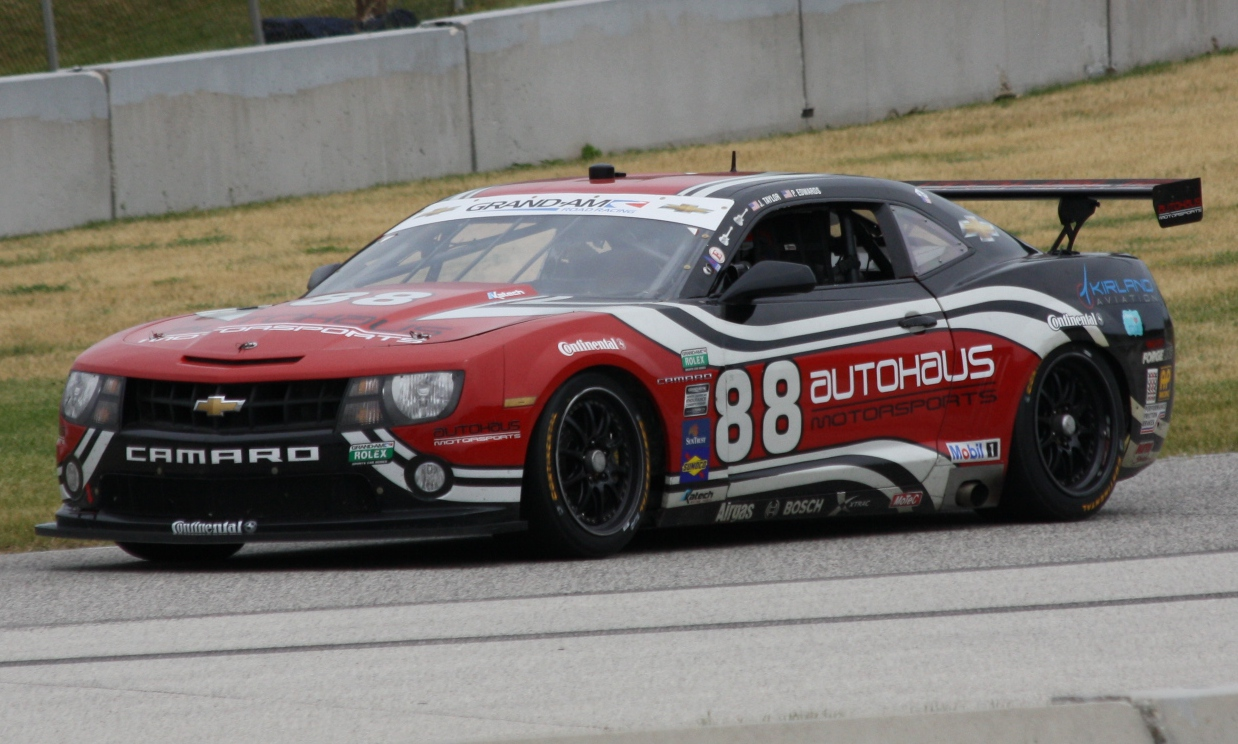
2012 GT car

Born in Orlando, Taylor began his career in professional sports car racing in 2008, competing in the 24 Hours of Daytona and finishing fifteenth. In 2009, he ran eight races for Beyer Racing at the Rolex Sports Car Series in the Daytona Prototypes class. His first full season came in 2010, driving a Mazda RX-8 for Racers Edge Motorsports, claiming two GT class podiums. In 2011, he drove a Chevrolet Camaro for Autohaus Motorsports with Bill Lester, where he got one win and three second-place finishes, ending as the GT class runner-up. In late 2011, at a private test at Sebring, he impressed Corvette Racing enough that they recruited him to fulfill the third driver role for the team in the 2012 season, competing at Sebring, Petit Le Mans and also the 24 Hours of Le Mans, where he finished in fifth place in the LM GTE PRO No. 73 Corvette C6.R. Also in 2012, he claimed his second Rolex GT win for Autohaus Motorsports.

In 2013, Taylor joined Wayne Taylor Racing, a team owned by his father, sports car veteran Wayne Taylor, co-driving with Max Angelelli. He and Angelelli teamed to win the 2013 Rolex Sports Car Series' Daytona Prototype championship, winning five races, including the last three of the season consecutively.

In 2014, the Grand-Am Rolex Series merged with the American Le Mans Series to form the new United SportsCar Championship (now IMSA SportsCar Championship). With his brother Ricky Taylor as teammate, he was runner-up with two wins and six podiums. In 2015, he earned two wins and three second-place finishes. Taylor collected three wins and seven podiums in 2016 and was third in points.

Taylor also competed at the 24 Hours of Le Mans from 2013 through 2017 in the GTE-Pro class for Corvette Racing, where he won the GT Pro class in 2015, and finished second in 2014 and third in 2017.

For the 2017 IMSA season, Taylor drove a Cadillac DPi-V.R. in the new Daytona Prototype International class. He won the 24 Hours of Daytona, the 12 Hours of Sebring, and the next three races. Later, he scored two additional podiums en route to the championship. He also won the Pirelli World Challenge SprintX GT Championship, driving a Cadillac ATS-V.R with codriver Michael Cooper. The duo won at Canadian Tire Motorsport Park, took four podiums, and finished in the top ten in nine out of ten races, taking the title by three points.

In 2018, Renger van der Zande became his new co-driver at Wayne Taylor Racing. He scored a single win at Petit Le Mans and three additional podiums, including a second-place finish at the 12 Hours of Sebring, and was third in the overall standings.

Taylor won the 2019 24 Hours of Daytona and finished second at the 12 Hours of Sebring and Petit Le Mans. However, he had poor results at the sprint races and finished fourth in points.

For the 2020 IMSA season, Taylor became a Corvette Racing full-time factory driver. He claimed five wins and three runner-up finishes to claim his third championship.

In 2021, Taylor got a class win at the 24 Hours of Daytona, as well as a second-place finish at the 24 Hours of Le Mans.

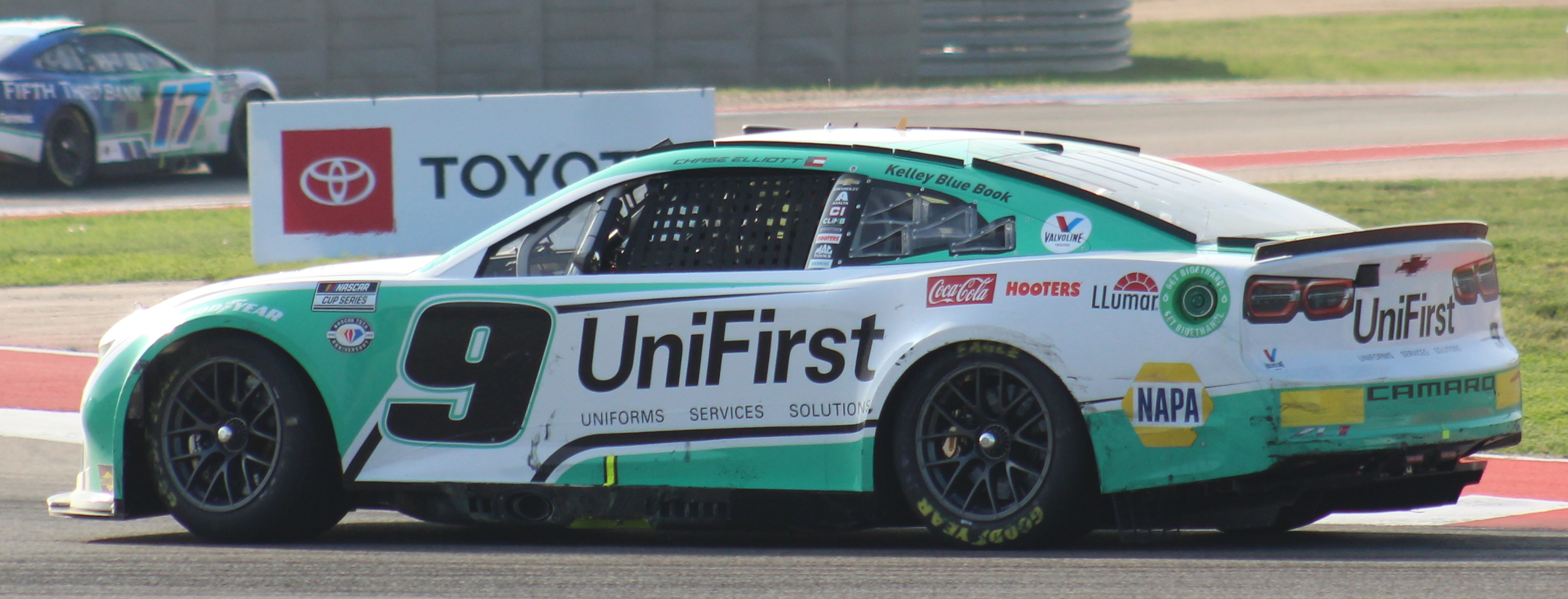
Taylor's No. 9 car at Circuit of the Americas in 2023

In 2023, Taylor made his NASCAR debut in the Cup Series race at Circuit of the Americas, driving the No. 9 as a substitute for Chase Elliott, who was recovering from a leg injury he suffered in a snowboarding accident in Colorado. Taylor started fourth and finished 24th. He later raced Kaulig Racing's No. 10 car in the Xfinity Series race at Portland International Raceway and ran well, but due to an issue, finished 27th. Taylor returned to Kaulig to drive their No. 11 car in the Xfinity Series race at the Charlotte Roval.

For the 2024 IMSA season, after spending four years with Corvette Racing, Taylor returned to his father's team, Wayne Taylor Racing, sharing the No. 40 Acura ARX-06 with Louis Delétraz. His older brother Ricky, as well as Filipe Albuquerque, were teammates in the No. 10 car.

== Media appearances ==
Taylor is well known for his quirky personality and his social media presence. He has an online alter ego known as Rodney Sandstorm, a parody of 1990s racers and Jeff Gordon, whose antics have drawn positive attention toward both Taylor and IMSA.

In particular, during the 2018 Talladega broadcast, Taylor received significant media attention when he, as Rodney Sandstorm, crashed a live NASCAR on Fox broadcast, causing announcer Darrell Waltrip to call for security (not knowing what was going on).

== Motorsports career results ==
=== Career summary ===
Season	Series	Team	Races	Wins	Poles	F/Laps	Podiums	Points	Position
2008	Rolex Sports Car Series – GT	Terra Firma Motorsports	3	0	0	0	0	34	85th
2009	Rolex Sports Car Series – GT	Beyer Racing	8	0	0	0	0	146	16th
2010	Rolex Sports Car Series – GT	Racers Edge Motorsports	11	0			2	248	11th
2011	Rolex Sports Car Series – GT	Autohaus Motorsport	12	1			4	317	**2nd**
2012	Rolex Sports Car Series – GT	Autohaus Motorsports	10	1			1	211	15th
2012	American Le Mans Series – GT	Corvette Racing	2	0	0	0	2	20	18th
2013	Rolex Sports Car Series – DP	Wayne Taylor Racing	12	5			6	339	**1st**
2013	American Le Mans Series – GT	Corvette Racing	2	0	0	0	0	10	26th
2014	United Sports Car Championship – Prototype	Wayne Taylor Racing	11	2			6	330	**2nd**
2015	United Sports Car Championship – Prototype	Wayne Taylor Racing	10	2			5	292	5th
2016	IMSA SportsCar Championship – Prototype	Wayne Taylor Racing	10	3			7	309	**3rd**
2017	IMSA SportsCar Championship – Prototype	Wayne Taylor Racing	10	5	0	2	7	310	**1st**
2018	IMSA SportsCar Championship – Prototype	Wayne Taylor Racing	10	1	0	0	4	270	**3rd**
2019	IMSA SportsCar Championship – DPi	Konica Minolta Cadillac	10	1	0	0	3	274	4th
2020	IMSA SportsCar Championship – GTLM	Corvette Racing	11	5	4	0	8	351	**1st**
2021	IMSA SportsCar Championship – GTLM	Corvette Racing	11	4	5	1	9	3549	**1st**
2022	IMSA SportsCar Championship – GTD Pro	Corvette Racing	10	1	1	1	5	3194	**3rd**
2023	IMSA SportsCar Championship – GTD Pro	Corvette Racing	11	2	0	0	6	3579	**3rd**
2023	NASCAR Cup Series	Hendrick Motorsports	1	0	0	0	0	0	NC†
2023	24 Hours of Le Mans – Innovative Car	Hendrick Motorsports	Reserve driver						
2023	NASCAR Xfinity Series	Kaulig Racing	2	0	0	0	0	21	55th
2024	IMSA SportsCar Championship – GTP	Wayne Taylor Racing with Andretti Autosport	9	1	1	1	2	2603	5th
2025	IMSA SportsCar Championship – GTP	Cadillac Wayne Taylor Racing	9	0	0	0	1	2304	10th
2025	NASCAR Craftsman Truck Series	Spire Motorsports	1	0	0	0	0	33	46th
2026	IMSA SportsCar Championship - GTP	Cadillac Wayne Taylor Racing	9	0	1	0	2	2556	8th

^{†} As Taylor was a guest driver, he was ineligible for championship points.

=== 24 Hours of Daytona results ===
Year	Team	Co-drivers	Car	Class	Laps	Pos.	Class Pos.
2008	(United States) Terra Firma Motorsports	(United States) Ronald Zitza (United States) Gary Jensen (United States) Mark Jensen	Porsche 911 GT3 Cup	GT	599	29th	15th
2009	(United States) Beyer Racing	(United States) Ricky Taylor (United States) Jared Beyer (Mexico) David Martínez	Riley Mk. XI	DP	662	20th DNF	10th DNF
2010	(United States) Racer's Edge Motorsports	(United States) Glenn Bocchino (United States) Jade Buford (United States) John Edwards (United States) Todd Lamb	Mazda RX-8 GT	GT	69	43rd DNF	28th DNF
2011	(United States) Autohaus Motorsports	(United States) Bill Lester (United States) Johnny O'Connell (Hong Kong) Matthew Marsh	Chevrolet Camaro GT.R	GT	607	28th	14th
2012	(United States) Autohaus Motorsports	(United States) Paul Edwards (Hong Kong) Matthew Marsh (United States) Tommy Milner	Chevrolet Camaro GT.R	GT	713	20th	9th
2013	(United States) Wayne Taylor Racing	(Italy) Max Angelelli (United States) Ryan Hunter-Reay	Dallara Corvette DP	DP	709	**2nd**	**2nd**
2014	(United States) Wayne Taylor Racing	(South Africa) Wayne Taylor (United States) Ricky Taylor (Italy) Max Angelelli	Dallara Corvette DP	P	695	**2nd**	**2nd**
2015	(United States) Wayne Taylor Racing	(United States) Ricky Taylor (Italy) Max Angelelli	Chevrolet Corvette DP	P	740	52nd	16th
2016	(United States) Wayne Taylor Racing	(United States) Ricky Taylor (Italy) Max Angelelli (Brazil) Rubens Barrichello	Chevrolet Corvette DP	P	736	2nd	2nd
2017	(United States) Wayne Taylor Racing	(United States) Ricky Taylor (Italy) Max Angelelli (United States) Jeff Gordon	Cadillac DPi-V.R	P	659	**1st**	**1st**
2018	(United States) Wayne Taylor Racing	(United States) Ryan Hunter-Reay (Netherlands) Renger van der Zande	Cadillac DPi-V.R	P	555	45th DNF	15th DNF
2019	(United States) Konica Minolta Cadillac	(Netherlands) Renger van der Zande (Spain) Fernando Alonso (Japan) Kamui Kobayashi	Cadillac DPi-V.R	DPi	593	**1st**	**1st**
2020	(United States) Corvette Racing	(Netherlands) Nicky Catsburg (Spain) Antonio García	Chevrolet Corvette C8.R	GTLM	785	16th	4th
2021	(United States) Corvette Racing	(Netherlands) Nicky Catsburg (Spain) Antonio García	Chevrolet Corvette C8.R	GTLM	770	11th	**1st**
2022	(United States) Corvette Racing	(Netherlands) Nicky Catsburg (Spain) Antonio García	Chevrolet Corvette C8.R GTD	GTD Pro	698	29th	6th
2023	(United States) Corvette Racing	(Spain) Antonio García (United States) Tommy Milner	Chevrolet Corvette C8.R GTD	GTD Pro	729	19th	**2nd**
2024	(United States) Wayne Taylor Racing with Andretti	(United Kingdom) Jenson Button (Switzerland) Louis Delétraz (United States) Colton Herta	Acura ARX-06	GTP	791	3rd	**3rd**

=== Grand-Am Rolex Sports Car Series results ===
(key)(Races in bold indicate pole position, Results are overall/class)

Year	Team	Class	Make	Engine	1	2	3	4	5	6	7	8	9	10	11	12	13	14	Rank	Points	Ref
2008	Terra Firma Motorsports	GT	Porsche 997 GT3 Cup	Porsche 3.6L Flat-6	DAY; 15	MIA	MEX	VIR	LGA	WGL	LEX	DAY; 15	BAR	MON	WGL	SON	NJ; 13	MIL	85th	34	
2009	Beyer Racing	DP	Riley Mk. XI/Crawford DP08	Pontiac/Chevrolet 5.0L V8/Honda 3.9L V6	DAY; 10	VIR	NJ	LAG; 16	WGI; 10	LEX; 14	DAY; 15	BAR; 13	WGI; 15	MON	MIL	HOM; 9			16th	146	
2010	Racers Edge Motorsports	GT	Mazda RX-8 GT	Mazda 2.0L 3-Rotor	DAY; 28	HOM; 17	BAR; 2	VIR; **6**	LIM; **11**	WGI; 6	LEX; **3**	DAY; 8	NJ; 9	WGI; 10	MON	MIL; 11			11th	248	
2011	Autohaus Motorsport	GT	Chevrolet Camaro GT.R	Chevrolet 6.0L V8	DAY; 14	HOM; 6	BAR; 7	VIR; 1	LIM; 2	WGI; 2	ROA; 5	LAG; 10	NJ; 4	WGI; 2	MON; 9	LEX; 8			2nd	317	
2012	Autohaus Motorsports	GT	Chevrolet Camaro GT.R	Chevrolet 6.0L V8	DAY; 9	BAR; 6	HOM; 9	NJ; 5	DET; 1	LEX; 9	ELK; 9	WGI; **5**	IMS; 10	WGI DP; 6	MON	LGA	LIM		15th	211	
2013	Wayne Taylor Racing	DP	Dallara Corvette DP	Chevrolet 5.5L V8	DAY; 2	COA; 10	BAR; 1	ATL; 6	DET; **1**	LEX; **6**	WGI; 10	IMS; **15**	ROA; 7	KAN; 1	LGA; 1	LIM; 1			1st	339	

=== American Le Mans Series results ===
(key)(Races in bold indicate pole position, Results are overall/class)

Year	Team	Class	Make	Engine	1	2	3	4	5	6	7	8	9	10	Rank	Points	Ref
2012	Corvette Racing	GT	Chevrolet Corvette C6.R	Chevrolet 5.5L V8	SEB; 2	LBH	LAG	LIM	MOS	LEX	ROA	BAL	VIR	PET; 2	18th	20	
2013	Corvette Racing	GT	Chevrolet Corvette C6.R	Chevrolet 5.5L V8	SEB; 11	LBH	LAG	LIM	MOS	ROA	BAL	COA	VIR	PET; 6	26th	10	

=== 24 Hours of Le Mans results ===
Year	Team	Co-Drivers	Car	Class	Laps	Pos.	Class Pos.
2012	(United States) Corvette Racing	(Spain) Antonio García (Denmark) Jan Magnussen	Chevrolet Corvette C6.R	GTE; Pro	326	23rd	5th
2013	(United States) Corvette Racing	(Spain) Antonio García (Denmark) Jan Magnussen	Chevrolet Corvette C6.R	GTE; Pro	312	19th	4th
2014	(United States) Corvette Racing	(Spain) Antonio García (Denmark) Jan Magnussen	Chevrolet Corvette C7.R	GTE; Pro	338	14th	**2nd**
2015	(United States) Corvette Racing – GM	(United Kingdom) Oliver Gavin (United States) Tommy Milner	Chevrolet Corvette C7.R	GTE; Pro	337	17th	**1st**
2016	(United States) Corvette Racing – GM	(United Kingdom) Oliver Gavin (United States) Tommy Milner	Chevrolet Corvette C7.R	GTE; Pro	219	DNF	DNF
2017	(United States) Corvette Racing – GM	(Denmark) Jan Magnussen (Spain) Antonio García	Chevrolet Corvette C7.R	GTE; Pro	340	19th	**3rd**
2021	(United States) Corvette Racing	(Netherlands) Nicky Catsburg (Spain) Antonio García	Chevrolet Corvette C8.R	GTE; Pro	345	21st	**2nd**
2022	(United States) Corvette Racing	(Netherlands) Nicky Catsburg (Spain) Antonio García	Chevrolet Corvette C8.R	GTE; Pro	214	DNF	DNF
2024	(Italy) Sprit of Race	(Denmark) Conrad Laursen (Denmark) Johnny Laursen	Ferrari 296 GT3	LMGT3	279	35th	8th
2025	(United States) Cadillac WTR	(Portugal) Filipe Albuquerque (United States) Ricky Taylor	Cadillac V-Series.R	Hypercar	189	DNF	DNF
2026	(United States) Cadillac WTR	(Portugal) Filipe Albuquerque (United States) Ricky Taylor	Cadillac V-Series.R	Hypercar	379	9th	9th

=== IMSA SportsCar Championship results ===
(key)(Races in bold indicate pole position, Results are overall/class)

Year	Team	Class	Make	Engine	1	2	3	4	5	6	7	8	9	10	11	Rank	Points	Ref
2014	Wayne Taylor Racing	P	Dallara Corvette DP	Chevrolet 5.5L V8	DAY; 2	SEB; 7	LBH; 2	LGA; 2	DET; 1	WGL; 5	MOS; 3	IMS; 4	ELK; 10	COA; 7	PET; 1	2nd	330	
2015	Wayne Taylor Racing	P	Dallara Corvette DP	Chevrolet 5.5L V8	DAY; 16	SEB; 2	LBH; 1	**LGA**; 2	DET; 6	WGL; 6	MOS; 1	ELK; 8	COA; 2	PET; 4		5th	292	
2016	Wayne Taylor Racing	P	Dallara Corvette DP	Chevrolet 5.5L V8	DAY; 2	SEB; 12	LBH; 1	LGA; 6	DET; 1	WGL; 4	MOS; 3	ELK; 3	COA; 1	PET; 3		3rd	309	
2017	Wayne Taylor Racing	P	Cadillac DPi-V.R	Cadillac 6.2 L V8	DAY; 1	SEB; 1	LBH; 1	COA; 1	DET; 1	WGL; 6	MOS; 7	ELK; 2	LGA; 3	PET; 9		1st	310	
2018	Wayne Taylor Racing	P	Cadillac DPi-V.R	Cadillac 5.5 L V8	**DAY**; 15	SEB; 2	LBH; 3	MDO; 5	DET; 5	WGL; 5	MOS; 2	ELK; 4	**LGA**; 12	PET; 1		3rd	270	
2019	Konica Minolta Cadillac	DPi	Cadillac DPi-V.R	Cadillac 5.5 L V8	DAY; 1	SEB; 2	LBH; 10	MDO; 6	DET; 9	WGL; 4	MOS; 6	ELK; 5	LGA; 4	PET; 2		4th	274	
2020	Corvette Racing	GTLM	Chevrolet Corvette C8.R	Chevrolet 5.5 L V8	DAY; 4	DAY; 1	**SEB**; 2	ELK; 1	VIR; 1	ATL; 5	**MDO**; 1	**CLT**; 1	**PET**; 2	**LGA**; 2	**SEB**; 5	1st	351	
2021	Corvette Racing	GTLM	Chevrolet Corvette C8.R	Chevrolet 5.5 L V8	DAY; 1	**SEB**; 4	DET; 2†	**WGL**; 1	**WGL**; 1	**LIM**; 1	**ELK**; 2	**LGA**; 2	**LBH**; 2	VIR; 2	PET; 6	1st	3549	
2022	Corvette Racing	GTD Pro	Chevrolet Corvette C8.R GTD	Chevrolet 5.5 L V8	DAY; 6	SEB; 1	**LBH**; 3	LGA; 4	WGL; 6	MOS; 2	LIM; 4	ELK; 3	VIR; 2	PET; 5		3rd	3194	
2023	Corvette Racing	GTD Pro	Chevrolet Corvette C8.R GTD	Chevrolet 5.5 L V8	DAY; 2	**SEB**; 5	LBH; 2	LGA; 4	WGL; 3	MOS; 1	LIM; 4	ELK; 3	VIR; 1	IMS; 5	PET; 7	3rd	3579	
2024	Wayne Taylor Racing with Andretti Autosport	GTP	Acura ARX-06	Acura AR24e 2.4 L Turbo V6	DAY; 3	SEB; 1	LBH; 10	LGA; 4	DET; 5	**WGL**; 4	ELK; 8	IMS; 11	PET; 7			5th	2603	
2025	Cadillac Wayne Taylor Racing	GTP	Cadillac V-Series.R	Cadillac LMC55R 5.5 L V8	DAY; 11	SEB; 11	LBH; 7	LGA; 7	DET; 9	WGL; 2	ELK; 9	IMS; 9	PET; 8			10th	2304	
2026	Cadillac Wayne Taylor Racing	GTP	Cadillac V-Series.R	Cadillac LMC55R 5.5 L V8	DAY; 6	SEB; 7	LBH; 8	**LGA**; 10	DET; 6	WGL; 8	ELK; 3	IMS; 4	PET; 3			8th	2556	

^{†} Non-points event.

=== Pirelli World Challenge results ===
(key)(Races in bold indicate pole position, Results are overall/class)

Year	Team	Class	Make	1	2	3	4	5	6	7	8	9	10	Rank	Points
2017	Cadillac Racing	SprintX GT	Cadillac ATS-V.R	VIR1; 4	VIR2; 3	MOS; 1	LIM1; 4	LIM2; 2	UTA1; 8	UTA2; 3	COA1; 4	COA2; 6	COA3; Ret	1st	175

=== NASCAR ===
(key) (Bold – Pole position awarded by qualifying time. Italics – Pole position earned by points standings or practice time. * – Most laps led.)

==== Cup Series ====
NASCAR Cup Series results
Year	Team	No.	Make	1	2	3	4	5	6	7	8	9	10	11	12	13	14	15	16	17	18	19	20	21	22	23	24	25	26	27	28	29	30	31	32	33	34	35	36	NCSC	Pts	Ref
2023	Hendrick Motorsports	9	Chevy	DAY	CAL	LVS	PHO	ATL	COA; 24	RCH	BRD	MAR	TAL	DOV	KAN	DAR	CLT	GTW	SON	NSH	CSC	ATL	NHA	POC	RCH	MCH	IRC	GLN	DAY	DAR	KAN	BRI	TEX	TAL	ROV	LVS	HOM	MAR	PHO	53rd	0^{1}	

==== Xfinity Series ====
NASCAR Xfinity Series results
Year	Team	No.	Make	1	2	3	4	5	6	7	8	9	10	11	12	13	14	15	16	17	18	19	20	21	22	23	24	25	26	27	28	29	30	31	32	33	NXSC	Pts	Ref
2023	Kaulig Racing	10	Chevy	DAY	CAL	LVS	PHO	ATL	COA	RCH	MAR	TAL	DOV	DAR	CLT	PIR; 27	SON	NSH	CSC	ATL	NHA	POC	ROA	MCH	IRC	GLN	DAY	DAR	KAN	BRI	TEX						55th	21	
2023	Kaulig Racing	11	Chevy																													ROV; 16	LVS	HOM	MAR	PHO	55th	21	

==== Craftsman Truck Series ====
NASCAR Craftsman Truck Series results
Year	Team	No.	Make	1	2	3	4	5	6	7	8	9	10	11	12	13	14	15	16	17	18	19	20	21	22	23	24	25	NCTC	Pts	Ref
2025	Spire Motorsports	7	Chevy	DAY	ATL	LVS	HOM	MAR	BRI	CAR	TEX	KAN	NWS	CLT	NSH	MCH	POC	LRP; 20	IRP	GLN	RCH	DAR	BRI	NHA	ROV	TAL	MAR	PHO	46th	33	

^{*} Season still in progress
^{1} Ineligible for series points

=== CARS Pro Late Model Tour ===
(key)

CARS Pro Late Model Tour results
Year	Team	No.	Make	1	2	3	4	5	6	7	8	9	10	11	12	13	CPLMTC	Pts	Ref
2023	N/A	1	Chevy	SNM	HCY	ACE	NWS; 20	TCM	DIL	CRW	WKS	HCY	TCM	SBO	TCM	CRW	66th	13	

Sporting positions
Preceded by Memo Rojas; Scott Pruett	Rolex Sports Car Series; Daytona Prototype Champion; 2013; With: Max Angelelli	Succeeded by João Barbosa; Christian Fittipaldi (IMSA SportsCar Championship Prototype post-merger)
Preceded by Dane Cameron; Eric Curran	IMSA SportsCar Championship; Champion; 2017; With: Ricky Taylor	Succeeded by Felipe Nasr; Eric Curran
Preceded by Earl Bamber; Laurens Vanthoor	IMSA SportsCar Championship; GTLM Champion; 2020-2021; With: Antonio García	Succeeded by Matt Campbell; Mathieu Jaminet (GTD Pro)
