= 2008 Six Hours of Watkins Glen =

Track Map of Watkins Glen International.

The 2008 Sahlen's Six Hours of the Glen was the seventh round of the 2008 Rolex Sports Car Series season. It took place at Watkins Glen International on June 7, 2008.

== Race results ==
Class Winners in bold.

Pos	Class	No	Team	Drivers	Chassis	Laps
Pos	Class	No	Team	Drivers	Engine	Laps
1	**DP**	**01**	**Chip Ganassi Racing**	**(United States) Scott Pruett** **(Mexico) Memo Rojas**	**Riley Mk. XX**	**179**
1	**DP**	**01**	**Chip Ganassi Racing**	**(United States) Scott Pruett** **(Mexico) Memo Rojas**	**Lexus 5.0L V8**	**179**
2	DP	58	Brumos Racing	(United States) David Donohue (United States) Darren Law	Riley Mk. XI	179
2	DP	58	Brumos Racing	(United States) David Donohue (United States) Darren Law	Porsche 3.99L Flat-6	179
3	DP	10	SunTrust Racing	(Italy) Max Angelelli (Canada) Michael Valiante	Riley Mk. XI	179
3	DP	10	SunTrust Racing	(Italy) Max Angelelli (Canada) Michael Valiante	Pontiac 5.0L V8	179
4	DP	60	Michael Shank Racing	(Brazil) Oswaldo Negri Jr. (United States) Mark Patterson	Riley Mk. XI	179
4	DP	60	Michael Shank Racing	(Brazil) Oswaldo Negri Jr. (United States) Mark Patterson	Ford 5.0L V8	179
5	DP	77	Doran Racing	**(Mexico)** Memo Gidley (United States) Brad Jaeger	Dallara DP01	179
5	DP	77	Doran Racing	**(Mexico)** Memo Gidley (United States) Brad Jaeger	Ford 5.0L V8	179
6	DP	6	Michael Shank Racing	(United States) John Pew (United Kingdom) Ian James	Riley Mk. XI	179
6	DP	6	Michael Shank Racing	(United States) John Pew (United Kingdom) Ian James	Ford 5.0L V8	179
7	DP	61	AIM Autosport	(United States) Brian Frisselle (Canada) Mark Wilkins	Riley Mk. XI	179
7	DP	61	AIM Autosport	(United States) Brian Frisselle (Canada) Mark Wilkins	Ford 5.0L V8	179
8	DP	99	GAINSCO/Bob Stallings Racing	(United States) Jon Fogarty (United States) Alex Gurney	Riley Mk. XX	179
8	DP	99	GAINSCO/Bob Stallings Racing	(United States) Jon Fogarty (United States) Alex Gurney	Pontiac 5.0L V8	179
9	DP	59	Brumos Racing	(United States) J.C. France (Portugal) Joao Barbosa (United States) Hurley Haywood	Riley Mk. XI	179
9	DP	59	Brumos Racing	(United States) J.C. France (Portugal) Joao Barbosa (United States) Hurley Haywood	Porsche 3.99L Flat-6	179
10	DP	76	Krohn Racing	(Sweden) Nic Jönsson (Brazil) Ricardo Zonta	Proto-Auto Lola B08/70	179
10	DP	76	Krohn Racing	(Sweden) Nic Jönsson (Brazil) Ricardo Zonta	Pontiac 5.0L V8	179
11	DP	09	Spirit of Daytona Racing	(United States) Guy Cosmo (Canada) Marc-Antoine Camirand (United States) Terry Borcheller	Coyote CC/08	178
11	DP	09	Spirit of Daytona Racing	(United States) Guy Cosmo (Canada) Marc-Antoine Camirand (United States) Terry Borcheller	Porsche 5.0L V8	178
12	DP	7	Sigalsport	(United States) Matt Plumb (United States) Gene Sigal	Riley Mk. XI	178
12	DP	7	Sigalsport	(United States) Matt Plumb (United States) Gene Sigal	BMW 5.0L V8	178
13	DP	91	GAINSCO/Bob Stallings Racing	(United States) Jim Matthews (Belgium) Marc Goosens (Germany) Marcel Tiemann	Riley Mk. XX	177
13	DP	91	GAINSCO/Bob Stallings Racing	(United States) Jim Matthews (Belgium) Marc Goosens (Germany) Marcel Tiemann	Pontiac 5.0L V8	177
14	DP	75	Krohn Racing	(United States) Tracy Krohn (Belgium) Eric van de Poele	Proto-Auto Lola B08/70	176
14	DP	75	Krohn Racing	(United States) Tracy Krohn (Belgium) Eric van de Poele	Ford 5.0L V8	176
15	DP	2	SAMAX Motorsport	(United States) Henry Zogaib (Scotland) Ryan Dalziel (Canada) Dave Empringham	Riley Mk. XI	175
15	DP	2	SAMAX Motorsport	(United States) Henry Zogaib (Scotland) Ryan Dalziel (Canada) Dave Empringham	BMW 5.0L V8	175
16 DNF	DP	23	Alex Job Racing	(United States) Bill Auberlen (United States) Joey Hand	Crawford DP08	173
16 DNF	DP	23	Alex Job Racing	(United States) Bill Auberlen (United States) Joey Hand	Porsche 3.99L Flat-6	173
17	**GT**	**69**	**SpeedSource**	**(United States) Emil Assentato** **(United States) Jeff Segal** **(United States) Nick Longhi**	**Mazda RX-8 GT**	**170**
17	**GT**	**69**	**SpeedSource**	**(United States) Emil Assentato** **(United States) Jeff Segal** **(United States) Nick Longhi**	**Mazda 2.0L 3-Rotor**	**170**
18	GT	57	Stevenson Motorsports	(Scotland) Robin Liddell (United States) Andrew Davis	Pontiac GXP.R	170
18	GT	57	Stevenson Motorsports	(Scotland) Robin Liddell (United States) Andrew Davis	Pontiac 6.0L V8	170
19	GT	07	Banner Racing	(United States) Paul Edwards (United States) Kelly Collins	Pontiac GXP.R	170
19	GT	07	Banner Racing	(United States) Paul Edwards (United States) Kelly Collins	Pontiac 6.0L V8	170
20	GT	72	Autohaus Motorsports	(United States) Lawson Aschenbach (United States) Tim Lewis Jr.	Pontiac GXP.R	169
20	GT	72	Autohaus Motorsports	(United States) Lawson Aschenbach (United States) Tim Lewis Jr.	Pontiac 6.0L V8	169
21	GT	27	O'Connell Racing	(United States) Kevin O'Connell (United States) Kevin Roush	Porsche 997 GT3 Cup	168
21	GT	27	O'Connell Racing	(United States) Kevin O'Connell (United States) Kevin Roush	Porsche 3.6L Flat-6	168
22	GT	06	Banner Racing	(United States) Leighton Reese (United States) Marc Bunting (United Kingdom) Andy Pilgrim	Pontiac GXP.R	168
22	GT	06	Banner Racing	(United States) Leighton Reese (United States) Marc Bunting (United Kingdom) Andy Pilgrim	Pontiac 6.0L V8	168
23	GT	22	Alegra Motorsports	(United States) Carlos de Quesada (Germany) Marc Basseng (Canada) J.F. Dumoulin	Porsche 997 GT3 Cup	168
23	GT	22	Alegra Motorsports	(United States) Carlos de Quesada (Germany) Marc Basseng (Canada) J.F. Dumoulin	Porsche 3.6L Flat-6	168
24	GT	70	SpeedSource	(Canada) Sylvain Tremblay (United States) Nick Ham (United States) David Haskell	Mazda RX-8 GT	167
24	GT	70	SpeedSource	(Canada) Sylvain Tremblay (United States) Nick Ham (United States) David Haskell	Mazda 2.0L 3-Rotor	167
25	GT	65	The Racer's Group	(United States) Craig Stanton (Mexico) Josémanuel Gutierrez (Canada) Hima Maher	Porsche 997 GT3 Cup	167
25	GT	65	The Racer's Group	(United States) Craig Stanton (Mexico) Josémanuel Gutierrez (Canada) Hima Maher	Porsche 3.6L Flat-6	167
26	GT	88	Farnbacher-Loles Racing	(Canada) Dave Lacey (United States) Steve Johnson (United States) John Potter	Porsche 997 GT3 Cup	167
26	GT	88	Farnbacher-Loles Racing	(Canada) Dave Lacey (United States) Steve Johnson (United States) John Potter	Porsche 3.6L Flat-6	167
27	GT	66	The Racer's Group	(United States) Bryce Miller (United States) Ted Ballou (United Kingdom) Richard Westbrook	Porsche 997 GT3 Cup	166
27	GT	66	The Racer's Group	(United States) Bryce Miller (United States) Ted Ballou (United Kingdom) Richard Westbrook	Porsche 3.6L Flat-6	166
28	GT	32	PR1 Motorsports	(Canada) Mike Forest (United States) Thomas Merrill	Pontiac GXP.R	166
28	GT	32	PR1 Motorsports	(Canada) Mike Forest (United States) Thomas Merrill	Pontiac 6.0L V8	166
29	DP	3	Southard Motorsports	(United States) Shane Lewis (United States) Bill Lester	Riley Mk. XI	165
29	DP	3	Southard Motorsports	(United States) Shane Lewis (United States) Bill Lester	Lexus 5.0L V8	165
30	GT	68	The Racer's Group	(United States) R.J. Valentine (United States) Bryan Sellers (United States) Randy Pobst	Porsche 997 GT3 Cup	165
30	GT	68	The Racer's Group	(United States) R.J. Valentine (United States) Bryan Sellers (United States) Randy Pobst	Porsche 3.6L Flat-6	165
31	GT	29	Alegra Motorsports	(Mexico) Roberto Garcia (United States) Scooter Gabel	Porsche 997 GT3 Cup	161
31	GT	29	Alegra Motorsports	(Mexico) Roberto Garcia (United States) Scooter Gabel	Porsche 3.6L Flat-6	161
32	GT	43	Team Sahlen	(United States) Wayne Nonnamaker (United States) Joe Nonnamaker	Chevrolet Corvette C6	161
32	GT	43	Team Sahlen	(United States) Wayne Nonnamaker (United States) Joe Nonnamaker	Chevrolet 5.7L V8	161
33 DNF	GT	14	Autometrics Motorsports	(United States) Cory Friedman (United States) Mac McGehee (United States) Ian Baas	Porsche 997 GT3 Cup	156
33 DNF	GT	14	Autometrics Motorsports	(United States) Cory Friedman (United States) Mac McGehee (United States) Ian Baas	Porsche 3.6L Flat-6	156
34 DNF	GT	64	The Racer's Group	(United States) Jim Lowe (United States) Jim Pace (United States) Tim Sugden	Porsche 997 GT3 Cup	151
34 DNF	GT	64	The Racer's Group	(United States) Jim Lowe (United States) Jim Pace (United States) Tim Sugden	Porsche 3.6L Flat-6	151
35	GT	30	Racers Edge Motorsports	(United States) Jonathan Bomarito (United States) Jameson Riley (United States) Craig Stone	Mazda RX-8 GT	115
35	GT	30	Racers Edge Motorsports	(United States) Jonathan Bomarito (United States) Jameson Riley (United States) Craig Stone	Mazda 2.0L 3-Rotor	115
36	GT	40	Hyper Sport	(United States) Joe Foster (United States) Patrick Dempsey (United States) Charles Espenlaub	Mazda RX-8 GT	104
36	GT	40	Hyper Sport	(United States) Joe Foster (United States) Patrick Dempsey (United States) Charles Espenlaub	Mazda 2.0L 3-Rotor	104
37 DNF	GT	21	Matt Connolly Motorsports	(United States) Tom Long (Italy) Diego Alessi (United States) Tom Nastasi	Pontiac GXP.R	97
37 DNF	GT	21	Matt Connolly Motorsports	(United States) Tom Long (Italy) Diego Alessi (United States) Tom Nastasi	Pontiac 6.0L V8	97
38 DNF	DP	16	Cheever Racing	(Spain) Antonio Garcia (Italy) Matteo Bobbi (Italy) Fabio Babini	Coyote CC/08	79
38 DNF	DP	16	Cheever Racing	(Spain) Antonio Garcia (Italy) Matteo Bobbi (Italy) Fabio Babini	Pontiac 5.0L V8	79
39 DNF	DP	47	Doran Racing	(United States) Burt Frisselle (Switzerland) Gabriele Gardel (United States) Richard Antinucci	Dallara DP01	78
39 DNF	DP	47	Doran Racing	(United States) Burt Frisselle (Switzerland) Gabriele Gardel (United States) Richard Antinucci	Ford 5.0L V8	78
40 DNF	GT	86	Farnbacher-Loles Racing	(United States) Eric Lux (United States) Leh Keen (Germany) Pierre Kaffer	Porsche 997 GT3 Cup	72
40 DNF	GT	86	Farnbacher-Loles Racing	(United States) Eric Lux (United States) Leh Keen (Germany) Pierre Kaffer	Porsche 3.6L Flat-6	72
41 DNF	GT	42	Team Sahlen	(United States) Joe Sahlen (United States) Will Nonnamaker	Chevrolet Corvette C6	62
41 DNF	GT	42	Team Sahlen	(United States) Joe Sahlen (United States) Will Nonnamaker	Chevrolet 5.7L V8	62
42 DNF	GT	26	Gotham Competition	(United States) Jerome Jacalone (United States) Joe Jacalone	Porsche 997 GT3 Cup	48
42 DNF	GT	26	Gotham Competition	(United States) Jerome Jacalone (United States) Joe Jacalone	Porsche 3.6L Flat-6	48
43 DNF	GT	67	The Racer's Group	(United States) Tim George Jr. (United States) Spencer Pumpelly (United States) Andy Lally	Porsche 997 GT3 Cup	37
43 DNF	GT	67	The Racer's Group	(United States) Tim George Jr. (United States) Spencer Pumpelly (United States) Andy Lally	Porsche 3.6L Flat-6	37
44 DNF	GT	87	Farnbacher-Loles Racing	(Germany) Dirk Werner (Germany) Wolf Henzler (Germany) Dominik Farnbacher	Porsche 997 GT3 Cup	8
44 DNF	GT	87	Farnbacher-Loles Racing	(Germany) Dirk Werner (Germany) Wolf Henzler (Germany) Dominik Farnbacher	Porsche 3.6L Flat-6	8
45 DNF	GT	74	George T. Smith	(United States) Andy Brumbaugh (United States) Jim Michaelian (United States) Bransen Patch	Porsche 997 GT3 Cup	6
45 DNF	GT	74	George T. Smith	(United States) Andy Brumbaugh (United States) Jim Michaelian (United States) Bransen Patch	Porsche 3.6L Flat-6	6

Rolex Sports Car Series
Previous race: 2008 Lime Rock GT Classic 250	2008 season	Next race: 2008 EMCO Gears Classic
