= 2008 Rolex Sports Car Series =

9th season of the racing series organized by Grand-Am

Seasons
- ← 2007 2009 →

The 2008 Rolex Sports Car Series season was the ninth season of the Grand-Am Rolex Sports Car Series presented by Crown Royal Cask No. 16. The 14-race championship for Daytona Prototypes (DP) and 13-race championship for Grand Touring (GT) cars began January 26, 2008, and concluded on September 20, 2008. New Jersey Motorsports Park replaced Iowa Speedway. At 15 races, it was the longest Rolex Sports Car Series season.

Chip Ganassi Racing drivers Scott Pruett and Memo Rojas won the DP drivers' championship, with Riley and Pontiac won the chassis and engine manufacturers' championships, respectively. In the GT class, Kelly Collins and Paul Edwards won the drivers' championship and brought Pontiac the manufacturers' championship.

== Schedule ==
All 200 or 250-mile (400 km) events have a maximum time limit of 2 hours and 45 minutes. 2008 season marked New Jersey Motorsports Park's Rolex Sports Car Series debut.

Rnd	Race	Class(es)	Length/Duration	Circuit	Date
1	(United States) Rolex 24 At Daytona	DP/GT	24 Hours	Daytona International Speedway	January 26; January 27
2	(United States) Gainsco Grand Prix of Miami	DP/GT	250 mi (400 km)	Homestead–Miami Speedway	March 29
3	Mexico City 250	DP/GT	250 mi (400 km)	Autodromo Hermanos Rodriguez	April 19
4	(United States) Bosch Engineering 250 at VIR	DP/GT	250 mi (400 km)	Virginia International Raceway	April 27
5	(United States) RumBum.com 250	DP/GT	250 mi (400 km)	Mazda Raceway Laguna Seca	May 17
6	(United States) Lime Rock GT Classic 250	GT	250 mi (400 km)	Lime Rock Park	May 26
7	(United States) Sahlen's Six Hours of the Glen	DP/GT	6 Hours	Watkins Glen International (Long)	June 7
8	(United States) EMCO Gears Classic	DP/GT	250 mi (400 km)	Mid-Ohio Sports Car Course	June 21
9	(United States) Brumos Porsche 250	DP/GT	250 mi (400 km)	Daytona International Speedway	July 3
10	(United States) Porsche 250 Presented by Bradley Arant	DP/GT	250 mi (400 km)	Barber Motorsports Park	July 20
11	(Canada) Circuit Gilles Villeneuve	DP/GT	200 mi (320 km)	Circuit Gilles Villeneuve	August 1
12	(United States) Crown Royal 200 at the Glen	DP	200 mi (320 km)	Watkins Glen International (Short)	August 8
13	(United States) Armed Forces 250	DP	250 mi (400 km)	Infineon Raceway	August 23
14	(United States) Supercar Life 250	DP/GT	250 mi (400 km)	New Jersey Motorsports Park	August 31
15	(United States) SunRichGourmet.com 1000	DP/GT	1,000 km (620 mi)	Miller Motorsports Park	September 20

== Entrants ==
Team	No.	Chassis Engine	Driver	Round	Sponsor
Daytona Prototype
Chip Ganassi Racing with Felix Sabates	01	Riley MkXX; Lexus 5.0L V8	(United States) Scott Pruett	1–5, 7–15	TELMEX
Chip Ganassi Racing with Felix Sabates	01	Riley MkXX; Lexus 5.0L V8	(Mexico) Memo Rojas	1–5, 7–15	TELMEX
Chip Ganassi Racing with Felix Sabates	01	Riley MkXX; Lexus 5.0L V8	(United Kingdom) Dario Franchitti	1	TELMEX
Chip Ganassi Racing with Felix Sabates	01	Riley MkXX; Lexus 5.0L V8	(Colombia) Juan Pablo Montoya	1	TELMEX
Chip Ganassi Racing with Felix Sabates	01	Riley MkXX; Lexus 5.0L V8	(United Kingdom) Alex Lloyd	15	TELMEX
Chip Ganassi Racing with Felix Sabates	02	Riley MkXI; Lexus 5.0L V8	(New Zealand) Scott Dixon	1	Target
Chip Ganassi Racing with Felix Sabates	02	Riley MkXI; Lexus 5.0L V8	(Mexico) Salvador Duran	1	Target
Chip Ganassi Racing with Felix Sabates	02	Riley MkXI; Lexus 5.0L V8	(United Kingdom) Alex Lloyd	1	Target
Chip Ganassi Racing with Felix Sabates	02	Riley MkXI; Lexus 5.0L V8	(United Kingdom) Dan Wheldon	1	Target
Vision Racing	03	Crawford DP03; Porsche 3.99L F6	(United States) John Andretti	1	
Vision Racing	03	Crawford DP03; Porsche 3.99L F6	(United States) Ed Carpenter	1	
Vision Racing	03	Crawford DP03; Porsche 3.99L F6	(United States) A. J. Foyt IV	1	
Vision Racing	03	Crawford DP03; Porsche 3.99L F6	(United States) Tony George	1	
Vision Racing	03	Crawford DP03; Porsche 3.99L F6	(Brazil) Vítor Meira	1	
Spirit of Daytona Racing	09	Fabcar FDSC/03; Porsche 3.99L F6	(Canada) Marc-Antoine Camirand	1	
Spirit of Daytona Racing	09	Fabcar FDSC/03; Porsche 3.99L F6	(United States) Guy Cosmo	1	
Spirit of Daytona Racing	09	Fabcar FDSC/03; Porsche 3.99L F6	(United States) Michael McDowell	1	
Spirit of Daytona Racing	09	Coyote CC/08/01; Porsche 3.99L F6	(Canada) Marc-Antoine Camirand	2, 7–12, 14	
Spirit of Daytona Racing	09	Coyote CC/08/01; Porsche 3.99L F6	(United States) Guy Cosmo	2, 7–12,14	
Spirit of Daytona Racing	09	Coyote CC/08/01; Porsche 3.99L F6	(United States) Terry Borcheller	7	
SAMAX Motorsport	2	Riley MkXI; Pontiac 5.0L V8	(United States) Henri Zogaib	1	Miami Garage; Cigarette Racing
SAMAX Motorsport	2	Riley MkXI; Pontiac 5.0L V8	(Germany) Lucas Luhr	1	Miami Garage; Cigarette Racing
SAMAX Motorsport	2	Riley MkXI; Pontiac 5.0L V8	(United Kingdom) Allan McNish	1	Miami Garage; Cigarette Racing
SAMAX Motorsport	2	Riley MkXI; Pontiac 5.0L V8	(Germany) Mike Rockenfeller	1	Miami Garage; Cigarette Racing
SAMAX Motorsport	2	Riley MkXI; BMW 5.0L V8	(United States) Henri Zogaib	2–5, 7–9	Miami Garage; Cigarette Racing
SAMAX Motorsport	2	Riley MkXI; BMW 5.0L V8	(United Kingdom) Ryan Dalziel	2–5, 7–9	Miami Garage; Cigarette Racing
SAMAX Motorsport	2	Riley MkXI; BMW 5.0L V8	(Canada) David Empringham	7	Miami Garage; Cigarette Racing
SAMAX Motorsport	11	Riley MkXI; Pontiac 5.0L V8	(United Kingdom) Ryan Dalziel	1	CANTV
SAMAX Motorsport	11	Riley MkXI; Pontiac 5.0L V8	(Venezuela) Milka Duno	1	CANTV
SAMAX Motorsport	11	Riley MkXI; Pontiac 5.0L V8	(Czech Republic) Tomáš Enge	1	CANTV
SAMAX Motorsport	11	Riley MkXI; Pontiac 5.0L V8	(Switzerland) Harold Primat	1	CANTV
Southard Motorsports	3	Riley MkXI; Lexus 5.0L V8	(United States) Bill Lester	1–5, 7–14	
Southard Motorsports	3	Riley MkXI; Lexus 5.0L V8	(United States) Shane Lewis	1–5, 7–13	
Southard Motorsports	3	Riley MkXI; Lexus 5.0L V8	(United States) Alex Barron	1	
Southard Motorsports	3	Riley MkXI; Lexus 5.0L V8	(United States) Ted Christopher	1	
Southard Motorsports	3	Riley MkXI; Lexus 5.0L V8	(Canada) Kenny Wilden	14	
Childress-Howard Motorsports	4	Crawford DP03; Pontiac 5.0L V8	(United States) Andy Lally	12	AT&T
Childress-Howard Motorsports	4	Crawford DP03; Pontiac 5.0L V8	(United Kingdom) Andy Wallace	12	AT&T
Michael Shank Racing	6	Riley MkXX; Ford 5.0L V8	(United Kingdom) Ian James	1–5, 7–15	Playboy
Michael Shank Racing	6	Riley MkXX; Ford 5.0L V8	(United States) John Pew	1–5, 7–15	Playboy
Michael Shank Racing	6	Riley MkXX; Ford 5.0L V8	(United States) A. J. Allmendinger	1	Playboy
Michael Shank Racing	6	Riley MkXX; Ford 5.0L V8	(United States) Burt Frisselle	1	Playboy
Michael Shank Racing	6	Riley MkXX; Ford 5.0L V8	(Brazil) Raphael Matos	15	Playboy
Michael Shank Racing	60	Riley MkXX; Ford 5.0L V8	(Brazil) Oswaldo Negri Jr.	1–5, 7–15	Michael Shank Racing
Michael Shank Racing	60	Riley MkXX; Ford 5.0L V8	(South Africa) Mark Patterson	1–5, 7–15	Michael Shank Racing
Michael Shank Racing	60	Riley MkXX; Ford 5.0L V8	(United States) Graham Rahal	1	Michael Shank Racing
Michael Shank Racing	60	Riley MkXX; Ford 5.0L V8	(United Kingdom) Justin Wilson	1	Michael Shank Racing
Michael Shank Racing	60	Riley MkXX; Ford 5.0L V8	(United Kingdom) Ryan Dalziel	15	Michael Shank Racing
Sigalsport	7	Riley MkXI; BMW 5.0L V8	(United States) Matt Plumb	1–5, 7–15	Fortune Market Media; RumBum.com
Sigalsport	7	Riley MkXI; BMW 5.0L V8	(Republic of Ireland) Michael Cullin	1	Fortune Market Media; RumBum.com
Sigalsport	7	Riley MkXI; BMW 5.0L V8	(France) Stéphan Grégoire	1, 15	Fortune Market Media; RumBum.com
Sigalsport	7	Riley MkXI; BMW 5.0L V8	(Republic of Ireland) Paddy Shovlin	1	Fortune Market Media; RumBum.com
Sigalsport	7	Riley MkXI; BMW 5.0L V8	(United States) Quentin Wahl	1	Fortune Market Media; RumBum.com
Sigalsport	7	Riley MkXI; BMW 5.0L V8	(United States) Gene Sigal	2–5, 7–15	Fortune Market Media; RumBum.com
Penske–Taylor Racing	9	Riley MkXI; Pontiac 5.0L V8	(Australia) Ryan Briscoe	1	Toshiba
Penske–Taylor Racing	9	Riley MkXI; Pontiac 5.0L V8	(United States) Kurt Busch	1	Toshiba
Penske–Taylor Racing	9	Riley MkXI; Pontiac 5.0L V8	(Brazil) Hélio Castroneves	1	Toshiba
Tuttle Team Racing	9	Riley MkXI; Pontiac 5.0L V8	(United States) Doug Smith	2	Tuttle Team Racing
Tuttle Team Racing	9	Riley MkXI; Pontiac 5.0L V8	(United States) Brian Tuttle	2	Tuttle Team Racing
SunTrust Racing	10	Dallara DP01; Pontiac 5.0L V8	(Italy) Max Angelelli	1–5, 7–15	SunTrust
SunTrust Racing	10	Dallara DP01; Pontiac 5.0L V8	(Canada) Michael Valiante	1–5, 7–15	SunTrust
SunTrust Racing	10	Dallara DP01; Pontiac 5.0L V8	(South Africa) Wayne Taylor	1	SunTrust
SunTrust Racing	10	Dallara DP01; Pontiac 5.0L V8	(United States) Ricky Taylor	1	SunTrust
RVO Motorsports	12	Riley MkXI; Pontiac 5.0L V8	(United Kingdom) Derek Bell	1	Rock Valley Oil
RVO Motorsports	12	Riley MkXI; Pontiac 5.0L V8	(United Kingdom) Justin Bell	1	Rock Valley Oil
RVO Motorsports	12	Riley MkXI; Pontiac 5.0L V8	(United States) Paul Dallenbach	1	Rock Valley Oil
RVO Motorsports	12	Riley MkXI; Pontiac 5.0L V8	(Estonia) Tõnis Kasemets	1	Rock Valley Oil
RVO Motorsports	12	Riley MkXI; Pontiac 5.0L V8	(United States) Roger Schramm	1	Rock Valley Oil
Cheever Racing	16	Coyote CC/08/01; Pontiac 5.0L V8	(Spain) Antonio García	1–3, 5, 7–15	Crown Royal Cask No.16
Cheever Racing	16	Coyote CC/08/01; Pontiac 5.0L V8	(Italy) Fabio Babini	1, 7, 15	Crown Royal Cask No.16
Cheever Racing	16	Coyote CC/08/01; Pontiac 5.0L V8	(Italy) Matteo Bobbi	1–5, 7	Crown Royal Cask No.16
Cheever Racing	16	Coyote CC/08/01; Pontiac 5.0L V8	(France) Stéphane Ortelli	1	Crown Royal Cask No.16
Cheever Racing	16	Coyote CC/08/01; Pontiac 5.0L V8	(United Kingdom) Tom Kimber-Smith	4, 8–10	Crown Royal Cask No.16
Cheever Racing	16	Coyote CC/08/01; Pontiac 5.0L V8	(Brazil) Christian Fittipaldi	11–15	Crown Royal Cask No.16
Cheever Racing	51	Coyote CC/08/01; Pontiac 5.0L V8	(Brazil) Thomas Erdos	1	Netvu
Cheever Racing	51	Coyote CC/08/01; Pontiac 5.0L V8	(United Kingdom) Tom Kimber-Smith	1	Netvu
Cheever Racing	51	Coyote CC/08/01; Pontiac 5.0L V8	(United States) Scott Mayer	1	Netvu
Cheever Racing	51	Coyote CC/08/01; Pontiac 5.0L V8	(United Kingdom) Mike Newton	1	Netvu
Cheever Racing	51	Coyote CC/08/01; Pontiac 5.0L V8	(United States) Brent Sherman	1	Netvu
Beyer Racing	19	Crawford DP03; Ford 5.0L V8	(United States) Jared Beyer	4, 9	
Beyer Racing	19	Crawford DP03; Ford 5.0L V8	(United States) Ricky Taylor	4	
Beyer Racing	19	Crawford DP03; Ford 5.0L V8	(United Kingdom) Andy Wallace	4	
Beyer Racing	19	Crawford DP03; Ford 5.0L V8	(United States) Jordan Taylor	9	
Alegra Motorsports	22	Riley MkXI; Porsche 3.99L F6	(United States) Carlos de Quesada	12	Gatorade
Alegra Motorsports	22	Riley MkXI; Porsche 3.99L F6	(Canada) Jean-François Dumoulin	12	Gatorade
Alegra Motorsports	22	Riley MkXI; Porsche 3.99L F6	(United States) Scooter Gabel	12	Gatorade
Alex Job Racing	23	Crawford DP03; Porsche 3.99L F6	(United States) Bill Auberlen	1–5, 7–9	Ruby Tuesday
Alex Job Racing	23	Crawford DP03; Porsche 3.99L F6	(United States) Joey Hand	1–5, 7–9	Ruby Tuesday
Alex Job Racing	23	Crawford DP03; Porsche 3.99L F6	(United States) Patrick Long	1	Ruby Tuesday
Alex Job Racing	23	Crawford DP03; Porsche 3.99L F6	(United Kingdom) Andy Wallace	1	Ruby Tuesday
Alex Job Racing	23	Riley MkXI; Porsche 3.99L F6	(United States) Bill Auberlen	10–15	Ruby Tuesday
Alex Job Racing	23	Riley MkXI; Porsche 3.99L F6	(United States) Joey Hand	10–15	Ruby Tuesday
Matt Connolly Motorsports	31	Chase CCE; Pontiac 5.0L V8	(Italy) Ettore Contini	1	P1 Groupe
Matt Connolly Motorsports	31	Chase CCE; Pontiac 5.0L V8	(United States) Bob Frost	1	P1 Groupe
Matt Connolly Motorsports	31	Chase CCE; Pontiac 5.0L V8	(United States) Seth Ingham	1	P1 Groupe
Matt Connolly Motorsports	31	Chase CCE; Pontiac 5.0L V8	(Slovakia) Miro Konopka	1	P1 Groupe
Matt Connolly Motorsports	31	Chase CCE; Pontiac 5.0L V8	(Germany) Mirco Shultis	1	P1 Groupe
Doran Racing	47	Dallara DP01; Ford 5.0L V8	(United States) Burt Frisselle	3–5, 7–13	BSI; Anasten Plus
Doran Racing	47	Dallara DP01; Ford 5.0L V8	(Switzerland) Gabriele Gardel	3–5, 7	BSI; Anasten Plus
Doran Racing	47	Dallara DP01; Ford 5.0L V8	(United States) Richard Antinucci	7	BSI; Anasten Plus
Doran Racing	47	Dallara DP01; Ford 5.0L V8	(United States) Ricky Taylor	8–13	BSI; Anasten Plus
Doran Racing	77	Dallara DP01; Ford 5.0L V8	(Mexico) Memo Gidley	1–5, 7–14	Kodak
Doran Racing	77	Dallara DP01; Ford 5.0L V8	(United States) Brad Jaeger	1–5, 7–14	Kodak
Doran Racing	77	Dallara DP01; Ford 5.0L V8	(Switzerland) Gabriele Gardel	1	Kodak
Doran Racing	77	Dallara DP01; Ford 5.0L V8	(Italy) Fabrizio Gollin	1	Kodak
Brumos Racing	58	Riley MkXI; Porsche 3.99L F6	(United States) David Donohue	1–5, 7–15	Brumos Porsche
Brumos Racing	58	Riley MkXI; Porsche 3.99L F6	(United States) Darren Law	1–5, 7–15	Brumos Porsche
Brumos Racing	58	Riley MkXI; Porsche 3.99L F6	(United States) Buddy Rice	1, 15	Brumos Porsche
Brumos Racing	59	Riley MkXI; Porsche 3.99L F6	(Portugal) João Barbosa	1–5, 7–15	Brumos Porsche
Brumos Racing	59	Riley MkXI; Porsche 3.99L F6	(United States) J. C. France	1–5, 7–15	Brumos Porsche
Brumos Racing	59	Riley MkXI; Porsche 3.99L F6	(United States) Terry Borcheller	1	Brumos Porsche
Brumos Racing	59	Riley MkXI; Porsche 3.99L F6	(United States) Hurley Haywood	1, 7, 15	Brumos Porsche
AIM Autosport	61	Riley MkXX; Ford 5.0L V8	(United States) Brian Frisselle	1–5, 7–15	Exchange Traded Gold; Barrick Gold
AIM Autosport	61	Riley MkXX; Ford 5.0L V8	(Canada) Mark Wilkins	1–5, 7–15	Exchange Traded Gold; Barrick Gold
AIM Autosport	61	Riley MkXX; Ford 5.0L V8	(United States) Colin Braun	1	Exchange Traded Gold; Barrick Gold
AIM Autosport	61	Riley MkXX; Ford 5.0L V8	(Canada) Andrew Ranger	1	Exchange Traded Gold; Barrick Gold
AIM Autosport	61	Riley MkXX; Ford 5.0L V8	(Brazil) Cristiano da Matta	15	Exchange Traded Gold; Barrick Gold
Krohn Racing	75	Riley MkXI; Pontiac 5.0L V8	(United States) Tracy Krohn	1	Krohn Racing
Krohn Racing	75	Riley MkXI; Pontiac 5.0L V8	(Belgium) Eric van de Poele	1	Krohn Racing
Krohn Racing	75	Riley MkXI; Pontiac 5.0L V8	(United Kingdom) Oliver Gavin	1	Krohn Racing
Krohn Racing	75	Lola B08/70; Pontiac 5.0L V8	(United States) Tracy Krohn	2–5, 7–15	Krohn Racing
Krohn Racing	75	Lola B08/70; Pontiac 5.0L V8	(Belgium) Eric van de Poele	2–5, 7–10, 12–15	Krohn Racing
Krohn Racing	75	Lola B08/70; Pontiac 5.0L V8	(Brazil) Roberto Moreno	2	Krohn Racing
Krohn Racing	75	Lola B08/70; Pontiac 5.0L V8	(United Kingdom) Oliver Gavin	11	Krohn Racing
Krohn Racing	75	Lola B08/70; Pontiac 5.0L V8	(United States) Boris Said	15	Krohn Racing
Krohn Racing	76	Riley MkXI; Pontiac 5.0L V8	(Sweden) Niclas Jönsson	1	Krohn Racing
Krohn Racing	76	Riley MkXI; Pontiac 5.0L V8	(Brazil) Ricardo Zonta	1	Krohn Racing
Krohn Racing	76	Riley MkXI; Pontiac 5.0L V8	(United Kingdom) Darren Turner	1	Krohn Racing
Krohn Racing	76	Lola B08/70; Pontiac 5.0L V8	(Sweden) Niclas Jönsson	2–5, 7–15	Krohn Racing
Krohn Racing	76	Lola B08/70; Pontiac 5.0L V8	(Brazil) Ricardo Zonta	2–5, 7–15	Krohn Racing
Riley–Matthews Motorsports; GAINSCO/Bob Stallings; Racing	91	Riley MkXI; Pontiac 5.0L V8	(Belgium) Marc Goossens	1–5, 7–15	Riley–Matthews; Motorsport
Riley–Matthews Motorsports; GAINSCO/Bob Stallings; Racing	91	Riley MkXI; Pontiac 5.0L V8	(United States) Jim Matthews	1–5, 7–15	Riley–Matthews; Motorsport
Riley–Matthews Motorsports; GAINSCO/Bob Stallings; Racing	91	Riley MkXI; Pontiac 5.0L V8	(United States) Ryan Hunter-Reay	1, 15	Riley–Matthews; Motorsport
Riley–Matthews Motorsports; GAINSCO/Bob Stallings; Racing	91	Riley MkXI; Pontiac 5.0L V8	(United States) Johnny O'Connell	1	Riley–Matthews; Motorsport
Riley–Matthews Motorsports; GAINSCO/Bob Stallings; Racing	91	Riley MkXI; Pontiac 5.0L V8	(Germany) Marcel Tiemann	7	Riley–Matthews; Motorsport
GAINSCO/Bob Stallings; Racing	98	Riley MkXI; Pontiac 5.0L V8	(Brazil) Cristiano da Matta	5	
GAINSCO/Bob Stallings; Racing	98	Riley MkXI; Pontiac 5.0L V8	(United States) Jimmy Vasser	5	
GAINSCO/Bob Stallings; Racing	99	Riley MkXX; Pontiac 5.0L V8	(United States) Jon Fogarty	1–5, 7–15	GAINSCO; Lowe's
GAINSCO/Bob Stallings; Racing	99	Riley MkXX; Pontiac 5.0L V8	(United States) Alex Gurney	1–5, 7–15	GAINSCO; Lowe's
GAINSCO/Bob Stallings; Racing	99	Riley MkXX; Pontiac 5.0L V8	(United States) Jimmie Johnson	1	GAINSCO; Lowe's
GAINSCO/Bob Stallings; Racing	99	Riley MkXX; Pontiac 5.0L V8	(United States) Jimmy Vasser	1, 15	GAINSCO; Lowe's
Grand Touring
Banner Racing	06	Pontiac GXP.R	(United States) Leighton Reese	1–5, 7, 9–11, 14–15	Banner Engineering
Banner Racing	06	Pontiac GXP.R	(United States) Marc Bunting	1, 4, 7–11, 14–15	Banner Engineering
Banner Racing	06	Pontiac GXP.R	(United Kingdom) Robert Nearn	1	Banner Engineering
Banner Racing	06	Pontiac GXP.R	(United States) Andy Pilgrim	1, 7	Banner Engineering
Banner Racing	06	Pontiac GXP.R	(Denmark) Jan Magnussen	2, 6, 8	Banner Engineering
Banner Racing	06	Pontiac GXP.R	(Canada) Ron Fellows	3, 6, 11	Banner Engineering
Banner Racing	06	Pontiac GXP.R	(United States) Chris Prey	5	Banner Engineering
Banner Racing	06	Pontiac GXP.R	(United States) Lawson Aschenbach	9	Banner Engineering
Banner Racing	07	Pontiac GXP.R	(United States) Paul Edwards	1–11, 14–15	Banner Engineering
Banner Racing	07	Pontiac GXP.R	(United States) Kelly Collins	1–11, 14–15	Banner Engineering
Banner Racing	07	Pontiac GXP.R	(Denmark) Jan Magnussen	1	Banner Engineering
Banner Racing	07	Pontiac GXP.R	(United States) Kris Wilson	15	Banner Engineering
Goldin Brothers Racing	08	Mazda RX-8	(United States) Keith Goldin	1	CCM Cellular
Goldin Brothers Racing	08	Mazda RX-8	(United States) Steve Goldin	1	CCM Cellular
Goldin Brothers Racing	08	Mazda RX-8	(United States) Squeak Kennedy	1	CCM Cellular
Goldin Brothers Racing	08	Mazda RX-8	(United States) Jim Meassick	1	CCM Cellular
Autometrics Motorsports	14	Porsche 997 GT3 Cup	(United States) Cory Friedman	1, 4, 7, 9	Mac Papers
Autometrics Motorsports	14	Porsche 997 GT3 Cup	(United States) Mac McGehee	1, 4, 7, 9	Mac Papers
Autometrics Motorsports	14	Porsche 997 GT3 Cup	(Germany) Ralf Kelleners	1	Mac Papers
Autometrics Motorsports	14	Porsche 997 GT3 Cup	(United States) Anthony Lazzaro	1	Mac Papers
Autometrics Motorsports	14	Porsche 997 GT3 Cup	(United States) Ian Baas	7	Mac Papers
Blackforest Motorsports	15	Ford Mustang FR500GT	(United States) Tom Nastasi	1–2, 4, 9	USG Sheetrock; DeWalt Tools
Blackforest Motorsports	15	Ford Mustang FR500GT	(Canada) David Empringham	1	USG Sheetrock; DeWalt Tools
Blackforest Motorsports	15	Ford Mustang FR500GT	(Canada) Jean-François Dumoulin	1–2, 4, 9	USG Sheetrock; DeWalt Tools
Blackforest Motorsports	15	Ford Mustang FR500GT	(United States) Boris Said	1	USG Sheetrock; DeWalt Tools
Blackforest Motorsports	50	Ford Mustang FR500GT	(Canada) John Farano	1–2, 11	Optical Mania; 3M Products
Blackforest Motorsports	50	Ford Mustang FR500GT	(United States) James Bradley	1	Optical Mania; 3M Products
Blackforest Motorsports	50	Ford Mustang FR500GT	(United States) John Cloud	1	Optical Mania; 3M Products
Blackforest Motorsports	50	Ford Mustang FR500GT	(United States) Carl Jensen	1	Optical Mania; 3M Products
Blackforest Motorsports	50	Ford Mustang FR500GT	(United States) Boris Said	1	Optical Mania; 3M Products
Blackforest Motorsports	50	Ford Mustang FR500GT	(Canada) David Empringham	2, 11	Optical Mania; 3M Products
Terra Firma Motorsports	17	Porsche 997 GT3 Cup	(United States) Gary Jensen	1	Millennia Fine Art
Terra Firma Motorsports	17	Porsche 997 GT3 Cup	(United States) Mark Jensen	1	Millennia Fine Art
Terra Firma Motorsports	17	Porsche 997 GT3 Cup	(United States) Jordan Taylor	1	Millennia Fine Art
Terra Firma Motorsports	17	Porsche 997 GT3 Cup	(United States) Ron Zitza	1	Millennia Fine Art
Matt Connolly Motorsports	21	Pontiac GTO.R	(Italy) Diego Alessi	1–11, 14–15	Built Best Windows; P1 Groupe
Matt Connolly Motorsports	21	Pontiac GTO.R	(United States) Hal Prewitt	1	Built Best Windows; P1 Groupe
Matt Connolly Motorsports	21	Pontiac GTO.R	(Australia) Karl Reindler	1, 15	Built Best Windows; P1 Groupe
Matt Connolly Motorsports	21	Pontiac GTO.R	(United States) Vic Rice	1	Built Best Windows; P1 Groupe
Matt Connolly Motorsports	21	Pontiac GTO.R	(United States) Spencer Trenery	1	Built Best Windows; P1 Groupe
Matt Connolly Motorsports	21	Pontiac GTO.R	(Germany) Jan Seyffarth	2	Built Best Windows; P1 Groupe
Matt Connolly Motorsports	21	Pontiac GTO.R	(United States) Matt Connolly	3, 11	Built Best Windows; P1 Groupe
Matt Connolly Motorsports	21	Pontiac GTO.R	(Mexico) José Montaño	3	Built Best Windows; P1 Groupe
Matt Connolly Motorsports	21	Pontiac GTO.R	(United States) Tom Long	4, 7	Built Best Windows; P1 Groupe
Matt Connolly Motorsports	21	Pontiac GTO.R	(United States) Ryan Phinny	5–6, 8–10, 14	Built Best Windows; P1 Groupe
Matt Connolly Motorsports	21	Pontiac GTO.R	(United States) Tom Nastasi	7	Built Best Windows; P1 Groupe
Matt Connolly Motorsports	21	Pontiac GTO.R	(United States) Romeo Kapudija	15	Built Best Windows; P1 Groupe
Alegra Motorsports	22	Porsche 997 GT3 Cup	(United States) Carlos de Quesada	1–2, 4, 7, 15	Gatorade; TodayMD.com
Alegra Motorsports	22	Porsche 997 GT3 Cup	(United States) Nathan Swartzbaugh	1	Gatorade; TodayMD.com
Alegra Motorsports	22	Porsche 997 GT3 Cup	(Germany) Marc Basseng	1, 15	Gatorade; TodayMD.com
Alegra Motorsports	22	Porsche 997 GT3 Cup	(France) Patrick Pilet	1	Gatorade; TodayMD.com
Alegra Motorsports	22	Porsche 997 GT3 Cup	(United States) Craig Stanton	2, 4, 7	Gatorade; TodayMD.com
Alegra Motorsports	22	Porsche 997 GT3 Cup	(Canada) Jean-François Dumoulin	7, 15	Gatorade; TodayMD.com
Alegra Motorsports	29	Porsche 997 GT3 Cup	(Canada) Louis-Philippe Dumoulin	1	
Alegra Motorsports	29	Porsche 997 GT3 Cup	(United States) Scooter Gabel	1–2, 4, 7	
Alegra Motorsports	29	Porsche 997 GT3 Cup	(United States) Chris Gleason	1	
Alegra Motorsports	29	Porsche 997 GT3 Cup	(United States) Jake Rosenzweig	1	
Alegra Motorsports	29	Porsche 997 GT3 Cup	(United States) Bob Woodman	1	
Alegra Motorsports	29	Porsche 997 GT3 Cup	(United States) Roberto Garcia	2, 4, 7	
Gotham Competition	26	Porsche 997 GT3 Cup	(United States) Jerome Jacalone	1–2, 7, 9, 14	Shopzilla.com
Gotham Competition	26	Porsche 997 GT3 Cup	(United States) Joe Jacalone	1–2, 7, 9, 14	Shopzilla.com
Gotham Competition	26	Porsche 997 GT3 Cup	(United States) Bob Michaelian	1	Shopzilla.com
Gotham Competition	26	Porsche 997 GT3 Cup	(United States) Jim Michaelian	1	Shopzilla.com
O'Connell Racing	27	Porsche 997 GT3 Cup	(United States) Kevin O'Connell	1, 3, 5, 7, 14–15	Taleo Grill
O'Connell Racing	27	Porsche 997 GT3 Cup	(United States) Hugh Plum	1	Taleo Grill
O'Connell Racing	27	Porsche 997 GT3 Cup	(United States) Kevin Roush	1, 3, 5, 7, 14–15	Taleo Grill
O'Connell Racing	27	Porsche 997 GT3 Cup	(United States) Kris Wilson	1	Taleo Grill
Racers Edge Motorsports	30	Mazda RX-8	(United States) Ken Dobson	1	Guardian Edge; Technologies
Racers Edge Motorsports	30	Mazda RX-8	(United States) Craig Stone	1–9	Guardian Edge; Technologies
Racers Edge Motorsports	30	Mazda RX-8	(United States) Drew Staveley	1	Guardian Edge; Technologies
Racers Edge Motorsports	30	Mazda RX-8	(United States) Robert Thorne	1–2	Guardian Edge; Technologies
Racers Edge Motorsports	30	Mazda RX-8	(United States) Jameson Riley	3–4, 7	Guardian Edge; Technologies
Racers Edge Motorsports	30	Mazda RX-8	(United States) Tommy Constantine	5–6	Guardian Edge; Technologies
Racers Edge Motorsports	30	Mazda RX-8	(United States) Jonathan Bomarito	7	Guardian Edge; Technologies
Racers Edge Motorsports	30	Mazda RX-8	(United States) Ross Smith	8–10	Guardian Edge; Technologies
Racers Edge Motorsports	30	Mazda RX-8	(United States) Bryan Sellers	10	Guardian Edge; Technologies
Racers Edge Motorsports	30	Mazda RX-8	(United States) Peter Ludwig	11	Guardian Edge; Technologies
Racers Edge Motorsports	30	Mazda RX-8	(United States) Doug Peterson	11, 15	Guardian Edge; Technologies
Racers Edge Motorsports	30	Mazda RX-8	(United States) Jordan Taylor	14	Guardian Edge; Technologies
Racers Edge Motorsports	30	Mazda RX-8	(South Africa) Dion von Moltke	14	Guardian Edge; Technologies
Racers Edge Motorsports	30	Mazda RX-8	(United States) Jose Armengol	15	Guardian Edge; Technologies
Racers Edge Motorsports	30	Mazda RX-8	(United States) Daniel Herrington	15	Guardian Edge; Technologies
PR1 Motorsports	32	Pontiac GXP.R	(Canada) Mike Forest	2, 4–5, 7–8, 14–15	
PR1 Motorsports	32	Pontiac GXP.R	(United States) Thomas Merrill	2, 5, 7	
PR1 Motorsports	32	Pontiac GXP.R	(United States) Patrick Barrett	4, 8, 14–15	
PR1 Motorsports	32	Pontiac GXP.R	(United States) James Gué	15	
Orbit Racing	33	Porsche 997 GT3 Cup	(United States) Larry Bowman	9	
Orbit Racing	33	Porsche 997 GT3 Cup	(United States) Boris Said	9	
Orbit Racing	34	Porsche 997 GT3 Cup	(United States) Mike Fitzgerald	1	PositiveOutput.com
Orbit Racing	34	Porsche 997 GT3 Cup	(United Kingdom) Johnny Mowlem	1	PositiveOutput.com
Orbit Racing	34	Porsche 997 GT3 Cup	(United States) Tom Papadopoulos	1	PositiveOutput.com
Orbit Racing	34	Porsche 997 GT3 Cup	(United States) Lance Willsey	1, 9	PositiveOutput.com
Orbit Racing	34	Porsche 997 GT3 Cup	(United States) Michael Riolo	9	PositiveOutput.com
Phoenix Performance Inc.	35	Chevrolet Corvette C6	(United States) Andrew Aquilante	1, 14	
Phoenix Performance Inc.	35	Chevrolet Corvette C6	(United States) John Heinricy	1, 14	
Phoenix Performance Inc.	35	Chevrolet Corvette C6	(United States) Don Knowles	1	
Hyper Sport	40	Mazda RX-8	(United States) Patrick Dempsey	1–2, 7–11, 14–15	SoBe
Hyper Sport	40	Mazda RX-8	(United States) Joe Foster	1–2, 4–11, 14–15	SoBe
Hyper Sport	40	Mazda RX-8	(United States) Charles Espenlaub	1, 4, 7, 15	SoBe
Hyper Sport	40	Mazda RX-8	(United States) Romeo Kapudija	1	SoBe
Hyper Sport	40	Mazda RX-8	(Canada) Scott Maxwell	1, 14	SoBe
Hyper Sport	40	Mazda RX-8	(United States) Nick Ham	5	SoBe
Hyper Sport	40	Mazda RX-8	(United States) Tim Pappas	6	SoBe
Team Sahlen	42	Chevrolet Corvette C6	(United States) Will Nonnamaker	2, 4–8, 11, 14–15	HRPWorld.com
Team Sahlen	42	Chevrolet Corvette C6	(United States) Joe Sahlen	2, 4–8, 10, 15	HRPWorld.com
Team Sahlen	42	Chevrolet Corvette C6	(United States) Wayne Nonnamaker	11, 14–15	HRPWorld.com
Team Sahlen	42	Chevrolet Corvette C6	(United States) Joe Nonnamaker	14	HRPWorld.com
Team Sahlen	43	Chevrolet Corvette C6	(United States) Wayne Nonnamaker	1–2, 4–8, 10, 14–15	HRPWorld.com
Team Sahlen	43	Chevrolet Corvette C6	(United States) Joe Nonnamaker	1–2, 4–8, 10–11, 14–15	HRPWorld.com
Team Sahlen	43	Chevrolet Corvette C6	(United States) Will Nonnamaker	1–2, 11, 14	HRPWorld.com
Team Sahlen	43	Chevrolet Corvette C6	(United States) Joe Sahlen	1	HRPWorld.com
Bullet Racing	44	Porsche 997 GT3 Cup	(United States) Zach Arnold	1	MB Euromotors
Bullet Racing	44	Porsche 997 GT3 Cup	(Canada) Glenn Nixon	1	MB Euromotors
Bullet Racing	44	Porsche 997 GT3 Cup	(Canada) Steve Paquette	1	MB Euromotors
Bullet Racing	44	Porsche 997 GT3 Cup	(United States) Dyrk van Zanten Jr.	1	MB Euromotors
Mastercar-Coast to Costa; Racing	52	Ferrari F430 Challenge	(Italy) Constantino Bertuzzi	1	
Mastercar-Coast to Costa; Racing	52	Ferrari F430 Challenge	(Italy) Joe Castellano	1	
Mastercar-Coast to Costa; Racing	52	Ferrari F430 Challenge	(Hong Kong) Chi Min Ma	1	
Mastercar-Coast to Costa; Racing	52	Ferrari F430 Challenge	(United States) Fred Machado	1	
Mastercar-Coast to Costa; Racing	52	Ferrari F430 Challenge	(Italy) Roberto Ragazzi	1	
Mastercar-Coast to Costa; Racing	56	Ferrari F430 Challenge	(Italy) Thomas Biagi	1	
Mastercar-Coast to Costa; Racing	56	Ferrari F430 Challenge	(United Kingdom) Matthew Marsh	1	
Mastercar-Coast to Costa; Racing	56	Ferrari F430 Challenge	(San Marino) Christian Montanari	1	
Mastercar-Coast to Costa; Racing	56	Ferrari F430 Challenge	(Spain) Luis Monzón	1	
Mastercar-Coast to Costa; Racing	56	Ferrari F430 Challenge	(Italy) Fabio Venier	1	
Playboy Racing	53	BMW M6	(United States) Mike Borkowski	8, 10, 15	Playboy
Playboy Racing	53	BMW M6	(United States) Tommy Constantine	8, 10, 15	Playboy
Playboy Racing	53	BMW M6	(United States) Anthony Lazzaro	15	Playboy
Level 5 Motorsports	55	Ferrari F430 Challenge	(United States) Scott Tucker	2, 5, 14–15	Boardwalk Ferrari; Priority Logistics
Level 5 Motorsports	55	Ferrari F430 Challenge	(United States) Ed Zabinski	2, 5, 14–15	Boardwalk Ferrari; Priority Logistics
Level 5 Motorsports	55	Ferrari F430 Challenge	(France) Christophe Bouchut	15	Boardwalk Ferrari; Priority Logistics
Stevenson Motorsports	57	Pontiac GXP.R	(United States) Andrew Davis	1–11, 14–15	Stevenson Motorsports; BryanMark Financial
Stevenson Motorsports	57	Pontiac GXP.R	(United Kingdom) Robin Liddell	1–11, 14–15	Stevenson Motorsports; BryanMark Financial
Stevenson Motorsports	57	Pontiac GXP.R	(United States) Gunnar Jeannette	1	Stevenson Motorsports; BryanMark Financial
Stevenson Motorsports	57	Pontiac GXP.R	(United States) Randy Pobst	1	Stevenson Motorsports; BryanMark Financial
Stevenson Motorsports	97	Chevrolet Corvette C6	(United States) James Gue	4, 9	StevensonAuto.com
Stevenson Motorsports	97	Chevrolet Corvette C6	(United States) Randy Pobst	4	StevensonAuto.com
Stevenson Motorsports	97	Chevrolet Corvette C6	(United States) Jeff Bucknum	9	StevensonAuto.com
The Racer's Group	62	Porsche 997 GT3 Cup	(United States) Jack Baldwin	1	Burtin Engineering; Foametix; Westfund.com
The Racer's Group	62	Porsche 997 GT3 Cup	(United States) Claudio Burtin	1	Burtin Engineering; Foametix; Westfund.com
The Racer's Group	62	Porsche 997 GT3 Cup	(Austria) Martin Ragginger	1	Burtin Engineering; Foametix; Westfund.com
The Racer's Group	62	Porsche 997 GT3 Cup	(United States) Scott Tucker	1	Burtin Engineering; Foametix; Westfund.com
The Racer's Group	62	Porsche 997 GT3 Cup	(United States) Ed Zabinski	1	Burtin Engineering; Foametix; Westfund.com
The Racer's Group	63	Porsche 997 GT3 Cup	(Canada) Pierre Bourque	1	Impremedia
The Racer's Group	63	Porsche 997 GT3 Cup	(United States) Duncan Ende	1	Impremedia
The Racer's Group	63	Porsche 997 GT3 Cup	(Canada) Hima Maher	1	Impremedia
The Racer's Group	63	Porsche 997 GT3 Cup	(United States) Ron Yarab Jr.	1	Impremedia
The Racer's Group	64	Porsche 997 GT3 Cup	(United States) Jim Lowe	1, 4–5, 7	Globus
The Racer's Group	64	Porsche 997 GT3 Cup	(United States) Jim Pace	1, 4–5, 7	Globus
The Racer's Group	64	Porsche 997 GT3 Cup	(United Kingdom) Tim Sugden	1, 7	Globus
The Racer's Group	64	Porsche 997 GT3 Cup	(United States) R.J. Valentine	1	Globus
The Racer's Group	64	Porsche 997 GT3 Cup	(United States) Johannes van Overbeek	1	Globus
The Racer's Group	65	Porsche 997 GT3 Cup	(United States) Tom Atherton	1	Lavender Briadal Salon
The Racer's Group	65	Porsche 997 GT3 Cup	(United States) Jason Daskalos	1	Lavender Briadal Salon
The Racer's Group	65	Porsche 997 GT3 Cup	(United States) Russ Oasis	1	Lavender Briadal Salon
The Racer's Group	65	Porsche 997 GT3 Cup	(United States) Jim Stout	1	Lavender Briadal Salon
The Racer's Group	65	Porsche 997 GT3 Cup	(Canada) Hima Maher	5, 7, 9–11	Lavender Briadal Salon
The Racer's Group	65	Porsche 997 GT3 Cup	(United States) Craig Stanton	5–11, 14–15	Lavender Briadal Salon
The Racer's Group	65	Porsche 997 GT3 Cup	(United States) John Potter	6, 14–15	Lavender Briadal Salon
The Racer's Group	65	Porsche 997 GT3 Cup	(Mexico) José Manuel Gutierrez	7–8, 15	Lavender Briadal Salon
The Racer's Group	66	Porsche 997 GT3 Cup	(United States) Ted Ballou	1–11, 14–15	Mitchell Rubber; Marquis Jet
The Racer's Group	66	Porsche 997 GT3 Cup	(United States) Bryce Miller	1–7	Mitchell Rubber; Marquis Jet
The Racer's Group	66	Porsche 997 GT3 Cup	(United States) Andy Lally	1, 8–9	Mitchell Rubber; Marquis Jet
The Racer's Group	66	Porsche 997 GT3 Cup	(United Kingdom) Richard Westbrook	1, 7	Mitchell Rubber; Marquis Jet
The Racer's Group	66	Porsche 997 GT3 Cup	(United States) Spencer Pumpelly	10–11, 14–15	Mitchell Rubber; Marquis Jet
The Racer's Group	66	Porsche 997 GT3 Cup	(United States) Bryan Sellers	15	Mitchell Rubber; Marquis Jet
The Racer's Group	67	Porsche 997 GT3 Cup	(United States) Tim George Jr	1–11, 14–15	The Racer's Group
The Racer's Group	67	Porsche 997 GT3 Cup	(United States) Spencer Pumpelly	1–9	The Racer's Group
The Racer's Group	67	Porsche 997 GT3 Cup	(United States) Bryan Sellers	1	The Racer's Group
The Racer's Group	67	Porsche 997 GT3 Cup	(Germany) Romain Dumas	1	The Racer's Group
The Racer's Group	67	Porsche 997 GT3 Cup	(France) Emmanuel Collard	1	The Racer's Group
The Racer's Group	67	Porsche 997 GT3 Cup	(United States) Andy Lally	7, 10–11, 14–15	The Racer's Group
The Racer's Group	67	Porsche 997 GT3 Cup	(United States) Patrick Long	15	The Racer's Group
The Racer's Group	68	Porsche 997 GT3 Cup	(United States) Michael Auriemma	1	Cohen Financial
The Racer's Group	68	Porsche 997 GT3 Cup	(United States) Michael Gomez	1	Cohen Financial
The Racer's Group	68	Porsche 997 GT3 Cup	(United States) John Mayes	1	Cohen Financial
The Racer's Group	68	Porsche 997 GT3 Cup	(United States) Brent Milner	1	Cohen Financial
The Racer's Group	68	Porsche 997 GT3 Cup	(United States) Scott Schroeder	1, 10	Cohen Financial
The Racer's Group	68	Porsche 997 GT3 Cup	(United States) Bryan Sellers	2, 4–9, 11, 14	Cohen Financial
The Racer's Group	68	Porsche 997 GT3 Cup	(United States) R.J. Valentine	2, 4–9, 11, 14	Cohen Financial
The Racer's Group	68	Porsche 997 GT3 Cup	(United States) Andy Lally	6	Cohen Financial
The Racer's Group	68	Porsche 997 GT3 Cup	(United States) Randy Pobst	7	Cohen Financial
The Racer's Group	68	Porsche 997 GT3 Cup	(Mexico) José Manuel Gutierrez	10	Cohen Financial
JLowe Racing	63	Porsche 997 GT3 Cup	(United States) Jim Lowe	9, 14	Porsche of the Main Line
JLowe Racing	63	Porsche 997 GT3 Cup	(United States) Jim Pace	9, 14	Porsche of the Main Line
JLowe Racing	64	Porsche 997 GT3 Cup	(United Kingdom) Tim Sugden	14	Porsche of the Main Line
JLowe Racing	64	Porsche 997 GT3 Cup	(United States) Johannes van Overbeek	14	Porsche of the Main Line
SpeedSource	69	Mazda RX-8	(United States) Emil Assentato	1–11, 14–15	FXDD
SpeedSource	69	Mazda RX-8	(United States) Nick Longhi	1, 3, 7, 15	FXDD
SpeedSource	69	Mazda RX-8	(United States) Lonnie Pechnik	1	FXDD
SpeedSource	69	Mazda RX-8	(United States) Jeff Segal	1–11, 14–15	FXDD
SpeedSource	69	Mazda RX-8	(United States) David Haskell	9	FXDD
SpeedSource	70	Mazda RX-8	(United States) Nick Ham	1–11, 14–15	Mazdaspeed
SpeedSource	70	Mazda RX-8	(Canada) Sylvain Tremblay	1–11, 14–15	Mazdaspeed
SpeedSource	70	Mazda RX-8	(United States) David Haskell	1, 7, 15	Mazdaspeed
SpeedSource	70	Mazda RX-8	(Brazil) Raphael Matos	1	Mazdaspeed
Synergy Racing	71	Porsche 997 GT3 Cup	(United States) Carey Grant	4, 8, 10	Coutyrad by Marriott
Synergy Racing	71	Porsche 997 GT3 Cup	(United States) Kevin Grant	4, 8, 10	Coutyrad by Marriott
Synergy Racing	71	Porsche 997 GT3 Cup	(United States) Milton Grant	4, 8, 10	Coutyrad by Marriott
Synergy Racing	80	Porsche 997 GT3 Cup	(United States) Mark Greenberg	1	EMC Mechanical; Gamewell Mechanical; NETTTS
Synergy Racing	80	Porsche 997 GT3 Cup	(Republic of Ireland) Damien Faulkner	1	EMC Mechanical; Gamewell Mechanical; NETTTS
Synergy Racing	80	Porsche 997 GT3 Cup	(Germany) Lance David Arnold	1	EMC Mechanical; Gamewell Mechanical; NETTTS
Synergy Racing	80	Porsche 997 GT3 Cup	(Belgium) Jan Heylen	1–2	EMC Mechanical; Gamewell Mechanical; NETTTS
Synergy Racing	80	Porsche 997 GT3 Cup	(United States) Steve Johnson	2	EMC Mechanical; Gamewell Mechanical; NETTTS
Synergy Racing	80	Porsche 997 GT3 Cup	(United States) Patrick Long	4	EMC Mechanical; Gamewell Mechanical; NETTTS
Synergy Racing	80	Porsche 997 GT3 Cup	(United States) David Murry	4	EMC Mechanical; Gamewell Mechanical; NETTTS
Synergy Racing	81	Porsche 997 GT3 Cup	(United States) Steve Johnson	1	EMC Mechanical; Gamewell Mechanical; Lowe's
Synergy Racing	81	Porsche 997 GT3 Cup	(Netherlands) Patrick Huisman	1	EMC Mechanical; Gamewell Mechanical; Lowe's
Synergy Racing	81	Porsche 997 GT3 Cup	(Netherlands) Robert Doornbos	1	EMC Mechanical; Gamewell Mechanical; Lowe's
Synergy Racing	81	Porsche 997 GT3 Cup	(Austria) Richard Lietz	1	EMC Mechanical; Gamewell Mechanical; Lowe's
Autohaus Motorsports	72	Pontiac GXP.R	(United States) Lawson Aschenbach	1–8	Autohaus Motorsports
Autohaus Motorsports	72	Pontiac GXP.R	(United States) Tim Lewis Jr.	1–11, 14–15	Autohaus Motorsports
Autohaus Motorsports	72	Pontiac GXP.R	(Italy) Max Papis	1	Autohaus Motorsports
Autohaus Motorsports	72	Pontiac GXP.R	(United States) Craig Stanton	1	Autohaus Motorsports
Autohaus Motorsports	72	Pontiac GXP.R	(United States) Terry Borcheller	8–11, 14–15	Autohaus Motorsports
GTS Racing with Mitchum; Motorsports	74	Porsche 997 GT3 Cup	(United States) Jim Hamblin	1	Churchill Transport
GTS Racing with Mitchum; Motorsports	74	Porsche 997 GT3 Cup	(United States) David Murry	1	Churchill Transport
GTS Racing with Mitchum; Motorsports	74	Porsche 997 GT3 Cup	(United States) Bransen Patch	1, 7, 9	Churchill Transport
GTS Racing with Mitchum; Motorsports	74	Porsche 997 GT3 Cup	(United States) Joseph Safina	1–2, 9	Churchill Transport
GTS Racing with Mitchum; Motorsports	74	Porsche 997 GT3 Cup	(United States) Derek Skea	1–2, 8–9	Churchill Transport
GTS Racing with Mitchum; Motorsports	74	Porsche 997 GT3 Cup	(United States) Anthony Lazzaro	2, 8	Churchill Transport
GTS Racing with Mitchum; Motorsports	74	Porsche 997 GT3 Cup	(United States) Andy Brumbaugh	7	Churchill Transport
GTS Racing with Mitchum; Motorsports	74	Porsche 997 GT3 Cup	(United States) Zach Schiff	8	Churchill Transport
Farnbacher Loles; Motorsports	83	Porsche 997 GT3 Cup	(Germany) Tim Bergmeister	1	Farnbacher Loles; Motorsports
Farnbacher Loles; Motorsports	83	Porsche 997 GT3 Cup	(United States) C.R. Crews	1	Farnbacher Loles; Motorsports
Farnbacher Loles; Motorsports	83	Porsche 997 GT3 Cup	(United States) Peter Ludwig	1	Farnbacher Loles; Motorsports
Farnbacher Loles; Motorsports	83	Porsche 997 GT3 Cup	(United States) Ben McCrackin	1	Farnbacher Loles; Motorsports
Farnbacher Loles; Motorsports	83	Porsche 997 GT3 Cup	(United States) Russell Walker	1	Farnbacher Loles; Motorsports
Farnbacher Loles; Motorsports	84	Porsche 997 GT3 Cup	(United States) Chris Bingham	1	Farnbacher Loles; Motorsports
Farnbacher Loles; Motorsports	84	Porsche 997 GT3 Cup	(United States) Bill Cotter	1	Farnbacher Loles; Motorsports
Farnbacher Loles; Motorsports	84	Porsche 997 GT3 Cup	(United Kingdom) Chris Pennington	1	Farnbacher Loles; Motorsports
Farnbacher Loles; Motorsports	84	Porsche 997 GT3 Cup	(United States) Don Pickering	1	Farnbacher Loles; Motorsports
Farnbacher Loles; Motorsports	85	Porsche 997 GT3 Cup	(Canada) Ross Bentley	1	Farnbacher Loles; Motorsports
Farnbacher Loles; Motorsports	85	Porsche 997 GT3 Cup	(United States) Don Kitch Jr.	1	Farnbacher Loles; Motorsports
Farnbacher Loles; Motorsports	85	Porsche 997 GT3 Cup	(United States) Steve Miller	1	Farnbacher Loles; Motorsports
Farnbacher Loles; Motorsports	85	Porsche 997 GT3 Cup	(United States) Chris Pallis	1	Farnbacher Loles; Motorsports
Farnbacher Loles; Motorsports	86	Porsche 997 GT3 Cup	(United States) Eric Lux	1–11, 14–15	Farnbacher Loles; Motorsports
Farnbacher Loles; Motorsports	86	Porsche 997 GT3 Cup	(United States) Leh Keen	1–11, 14–15	Farnbacher Loles; Motorsports
Farnbacher Loles; Motorsports	86	Porsche 997 GT3 Cup	(Germany) Wolf Henzler	1	Farnbacher Loles; Motorsports
Farnbacher Loles; Motorsports	86	Porsche 997 GT3 Cup	(Germany) Jörg Bergmeister	1	Farnbacher Loles; Motorsports
Farnbacher Loles; Motorsports	86	Porsche 997 GT3 Cup	(Germany) Sascha Maassen	1	Farnbacher Loles; Motorsports
Farnbacher Loles; Motorsports	86	Porsche 997 GT3 Cup	(Germany) Pierre Kaffer	7	Farnbacher Loles; Motorsports
Farnbacher Loles; Motorsports	86	Porsche 997 GT3 Cup	(Germany) Dominik Farnbacher	15	Farnbacher Loles; Motorsports
Farnbacher Loles; Motorsports	87	Porsche 997 GT3 Cup	(Germany) Dirk Werner	1–11, 14–15	Farnbacher Loles; Motorsports
Farnbacher Loles; Motorsports	87	Porsche 997 GT3 Cup	(Germany) Dominik Farnbacher	1–2, 4, 6–7	Farnbacher Loles; Motorsports
Farnbacher Loles; Motorsports	87	Porsche 997 GT3 Cup	(Germany) Pierre Ehret	1	Farnbacher Loles; Motorsports
Farnbacher Loles; Motorsports	87	Porsche 997 GT3 Cup	(Germany) Timo Bernhard	1	Farnbacher Loles; Motorsports
Farnbacher Loles; Motorsports	87	Porsche 997 GT3 Cup	(Germany) Pierre Kaffer	3, 5	Farnbacher Loles; Motorsports
Farnbacher Loles; Motorsports	87	Porsche 997 GT3 Cup	(Germany) Wolf Henzler	7, 15	Farnbacher Loles; Motorsports
Farnbacher Loles; Motorsports	87	Porsche 997 GT3 Cup	(United States) Bryce Miller	8–11, 14–15	Farnbacher Loles; Motorsports
Farnbacher Loles; Motorsports	88	Porsche 997 GT3 Cup	(Canada) Dave Lacey	1–2, 4–5, 7–8, 11, 14–15	Farnbacher Loles; Motorsports
Farnbacher Loles; Motorsports	88	Porsche 997 GT3 Cup	(Canada) Greg Wilkins	1	Farnbacher Loles; Motorsports
Farnbacher Loles; Motorsports	88	Porsche 997 GT3 Cup	(United States) Eric Curran	1	Farnbacher Loles; Motorsports
Farnbacher Loles; Motorsports	88	Porsche 997 GT3 Cup	(Germany) Pierre Kaffer	1	Farnbacher Loles; Motorsports
Farnbacher Loles; Motorsports	88	Porsche 997 GT3 Cup	(Germany) Frank Stippler	1	Farnbacher Loles; Motorsports
Farnbacher Loles; Motorsports	88	Porsche 997 GT3 Cup	(United States) Patrick Long	2	Farnbacher Loles; Motorsports
Farnbacher Loles; Motorsports	88	Porsche 997 GT3 Cup	(United States) Steve Johnson	4–5, 7–8, 10–11, 14–15	Farnbacher Loles; Motorsports
Farnbacher Loles; Motorsports	88	Porsche 997 GT3 Cup	(United States) John Potter	7	Farnbacher Loles; Motorsports
Farnbacher Loles; Motorsports	88	Porsche 997 GT3 Cup	(United Kingdom) Richard Westbrook	10	Farnbacher Loles; Motorsports
Farnbacher Loles; Motorsports	88	Porsche 997 GT3 Cup	(Germany) Dominik Farnbacher	15	Farnbacher Loles; Motorsports
Farnbacher Loles; Motorsports	88	Porsche 997 GT3 Cup	(Germany) Wolf Henzler	15	Farnbacher Loles; Motorsports
Farnbacher Loles; Motorsports	89	Porsche 997 GT3 Cup	(Italy) Luca Drudi	1	Farnbacher Loles; Motorsports
Farnbacher Loles; Motorsports	89	Porsche 997 GT3 Cup	(Italy) Raffael Giammaria	1	Farnbacher Loles; Motorsports
Farnbacher Loles; Motorsports	89	Porsche 997 GT3 Cup	(Germany) Jörg Hardt	1	Farnbacher Loles; Motorsports
Farnbacher Loles; Motorsports	89	Porsche 997 GT3 Cup	(Italy) Giacomo Petrobelli	1	Farnbacher Loles; Motorsports
Farnbacher Loles; Motorsports	89	Porsche 997 GT3 Cup	(Italy) Gabrio Rosa	1	Farnbacher Loles; Motorsports
Automatic Racing	90	BMW M6	(United States) Tom Long	1	
Automatic Racing	90	BMW M6	(United States) David Russell	1	
Automatic Racing	90	BMW M6	(United States) Jep Thornton	1	
Automatic Racing	90	BMW M6	(United States) Joe Varde	1	

== Television ==
- All races will be shown in the United States and Canada on Speed Channel with the exception of the first 90 minutes of the Rolex 24 at Daytona, which will be shown on Fox.
- The Rolex 24 at Daytona will be broadcast in high-definition for the first time ever.
- The series will also be broadcast to Europe, Latin America, and South America by SportKlub and Speed Latin America.
- The ESPN Family of Networks will broadcast one-hour highlight shows to other countries not receiving full broadcasts.

== Changes ==
=== Rules ===
- For 2008 all participants will use Pirelli P-Zero racing tires until the end of 2010 season before Pirelli return to Formula One in 2011.
- A driver must now drive at least 30 minutes in a race to receive championship points.
- Safety car pit lane procedure has changed:
  - DP cars pit on first lap after pit lane opens
  - GT cars pit on second lap after pit lane opens

=== Competition Adjustments ===
- May 27, 2008:
  - Corvette prep 2 w/ solid axle minimum weight reduced to 2,575 lb (1,168 kg).
  - Pontiac GTO and GXP.R minimum weight increased to 2,800 lb (1,300 kg). w/ solid axle or 2,912 lb (1,321 kg). w/ DP transaxle
  - Pontiac GTO and GXP.R maximum rear weight percentage reduced from 51% to 49%
- June 17, 2008:
  - Porsche 911 minimum ride height decreased from 3.5 inches (89 mm) to 2.5 inches (64 mm)

== Season Results ==
Rnd	Circuit	DP Winning Team	GT Winning Team
Rnd	Circuit	DP Winning Drivers	GT Winning Drivers
1	Daytona (Report)	(United States) #01 Chip Ganassi Racing	(United States) #70 SpeedSource
1	Daytona (Report)	(United States) Scott Pruett (Mexico) Memo Rojas (Colombia) Juan Pablo Montoya (United Kingdom) Dario Franchitti	(United Kingdom) Nick Ham (United States) David Haskell (Brazil) Raphael Matos (Canada) Sylvain Tremblay
2	Homestead	(United States) #01 Chip Ganassi Racing	(United States) #07 Banner Racing
2	Homestead	(United States) Scott Pruett (Mexico) Memo Rojas	(United States) Kelly Collins (United States) Paul Edwards
3	Hermanos Rodriguez	(United States) #91 Riley-Matthews Motorsports	(United States) #57 Stevenson Motorsports
3	Hermanos Rodriguez	(Belgium) Marc Goossens (United States) Jim Matthews	(United States) Andrew Davis (United Kingdom) Robin Liddell
4	Virginia	(United States) #01 Chip Ganassi Racing	(United States) #57 Stevenson Motorsports
4	Virginia	(United States) Scott Pruett (Mexico) Memo Rojas	(United States) Andrew Davis (United Kingdom) Robin Liddell
5	Laguna Seca	(United States) #2 SAMAX Motorsport	(United States) #07 Banner Racing
5	Laguna Seca	(United Kingdom) Ryan Dalziel (United States) Henri Zogaib	(United States) Paul Edwards (United States) Kelly Collins
6	Lime Rock	no race	(United States) #07 Banner Racing
6	Lime Rock	no race	(United States) Paul Edwards (United States) Kelly Collins
7	Watkins Glen (Report)	(United States) #01 Chip Ganassi Racing	(United States) #69 SpeedSource
7	Watkins Glen (Report)	(United States) Scott Pruett (Mexico) Memo Rojas	(United States) Jeff Segal (United States) Emil Assentato (United States) Nick Longhi
8	Mid-Ohio (Report)	(United States) #99 GAINSCO/Bob Stallings Racing	(United States) #86 Farnbacher-Loles Racing
8	Mid-Ohio (Report)	(United States) Alex Gurney (United States) Jon Fogarty	(United States) Leh Keen (United States) Eric Lux
9	Daytona	(United States) #01 Chip Ganassi Racing	(United States) #70 SpeedSource
9	Daytona	(United States) Scott Pruett (Mexico) Memo Rojas	(United Kingdom) Nick Ham (Canada) Sylvain Tremblay
10	Barber	(United States) #01 Chip Ganassi Racing	(United States) #70 SpeedSource
10	Barber	(United States) Scott Pruett (Mexico) Memo Rojas	(United Kingdom) Nick Ham (Canada) Sylvain Tremblay
11	Gilles Villeneuve	(Canada) #61 AIM Autosport	(United States) #57 Stevenson Motorsports
11	Gilles Villeneuve	(Canada) Mark Wilkins (United States) Brian Frisselle	(United States) Andrew Davis (United Kingdom) Robin Liddell
12	Watkins Glen	(Canada) #61 AIM Autosport	no race
12	Watkins Glen	(Canada) Mark Wilkins (United States) Brian Frisselle	no race
13	Infineon	(United States) #10 SunTrust Racing	no race
13	Infineon	(Italy) Max Angelelli (United States) Michael Valiante	no race
14	New Jersey	(United States) #60 Michael Shank Racing	(United States) #67 The Racer's Group
14	New Jersey	(Brazil) Oswaldo Negri Jr. (South Africa) Mark Patterson	(United States) Tim George Jr. (United States) Andy Lally
15	Miller	(United States) #6 Michael Shank Racing	(United States) #07 Banner Racing
15	Miller	(United States) John Pew (United Kingdom) Ian James (Brazil) Raphael Matos	(United States) Kelly Collins (United States) Paul Edwards (United States) Kris Wilson

== Driver standings ==
=== DP ===
Pos	Driver(s)	DAY	MIA	MEX	VIR	LGA	WGL	LEX	DAY	BAR	MON	WGL	SON	NJ	MIL	Pts
1	(United States) Scott Pruett	1	1	2	1	3	1	8	1	1	5	13	6	9	9	408
1	(Mexico) Memo Rojas	1	1	2	1	3	1	8	1	1	5	13	6	9	9	408
2	(United States) Jon Fogarty	2	6	4	14	4	8	1	2	16	8	2	2	5	3	378
2	(United States) Alex Gurney	2	6	4	14	4	8	1	2	16	8	2	2	5	3	378
3	(United States) J. C. France	11	7	8	13	7	9	5	4	7	4	12	4	4	4	340
3	(Portugal) João Barbosa	11	7	8	13	7	9	5	4	7	4	12	4	4	4	340
4	(United States) Darren Law	13	19	11	19	5	2	2	5	2	3	3	9	10	10	334
4	(United States) David Donohue	13	19	11	19	5	2	2	5	2	3	3	9	10	10	334
5	(Canada) Mark Wilkins	19	8	15	6	6	7	4	18	15	1	1	3	6	6	332
5	(United States) Brian Frisselle	19	8	15	6	6	7	4	18	15	1	1	3	6	6	332
6	(Italy) Max Angelelli	5	14	18	17	8	3	10	20	6	6	7	1	2	2	328
7	(South Africa) Mark Patterson	6	3	5	9	16	4	6	13	4	18	8	12	1	13	325
8	(Sweden) Nic Jönsson	4	11	3	16	9	10	9	3	13	12	5	5	13	5	321
8	(Brazil) Ricardo Zonta	4	11	3	16	9	10	9	3	13	12	5	5	13	5	321
9	(United Kingdom) Ian James	9	16	6	4	10	6	16	19	3	7	9	14	7	1	315
9	(United States) John Pew	9	16	6	4	10	6	16	19	3	7	9	14	7	1	315
10	(Brazil) Oswaldo Negri Jr.	6	3	5	9	16	4	6	13	4	18^{†}	8	12	1	13	312
Pos	Driver(s)	DAY	MIA	MEX	VIR	LGA	WGL	LEX	DAY	BAR	MON	WGL	SON	NJ	MIL	Pts

Colour	Result
Gold	Winner
Silver	Second place
Bronze	Third place
Green	Points classification
Blue	Non-points classification
Blue	Non-classified finish (NC)
Purple	Retired, not classified (Ret)
Red	Did not qualify (DNQ)
Red	Did not pre-qualify (DNPQ)
Black	Disqualified (DSQ)
White	Did not start (DNS)
White	Withdrew (WD)
White	Race cancelled (C)
Blank	Did not practice (DNP)
Blank	Did not arrive (DNA)
Blank	Excluded (EX)

=== GT ===
Pos	Driver(s)	DAY	MIA	MEX	VIR	LGA	LRP	WGL	MID	DAY	BAR	MON	NJ	MIL	Pts
1	(United States) Kelly Collins	7	1	2	4	1	1	3	11	4	6	7	9	1	373
1	(United States) Paul Edwards	7	1	2	4	1	1	3	11	4	6	7	9	1	373
2	(United States) Andrew Davis	9	24	1	1	17	3	2	2	3	4	1	2	2	364
2	(United Kingdom) Robin Liddell	9	24	1	1	17	3	2	2	3	4	1	2	2	364
3	(United Kingdom) Nick Ham	1	5	13	11	3	2	8	7	1	1	2	16	5	351
3	(Canada) Sylvain Tremblay	1	5	13	11	3	2	8	7	1	1	2	16	5	351
4	(United States) Tim George Jr.	3	2	12	2	2	6	24	20	9	3	6	1	3	330
5	(United States) Bryce Miller	2	13	6	19	10	10	11	19	2	2	4	6	8	301
6	(United States) Ted Ballou	2	13	6	19	10	10	11	4	5	5	11	4	7	301
7	(United States) Spencer Pumpelly	3	2	12	2	2	6	24	20^{†}	9	5	11	4	7	297
8	(Germany) Dirk Werner	8	4	3	24	12	15	25^{†}	19	2	2	4	6	8	275
9	(United States) Leh Keen	19	12	8	3	5	14	21	1	20	10	5	5	13	274
10	(United States) Eric Lux	19	12	8	3	5	14	21^{†}	1	20	10	5	5	13	264
Pos	Driver(s)	DAY	MIA	MEX	VIR	LGA	LRP	WGL	MID	DAY	BAR	MON	NJ	MIL	Pts

Colour	Result
Gold	Winner
Silver	Second place
Bronze	Third place
Green	Points classification
Blue	Non-points classification
Blue	Non-classified finish (NC)
Purple	Retired, not classified (Ret)
Red	Did not qualify (DNQ)
Red	Did not pre-qualify (DNPQ)
Black	Disqualified (DSQ)
White	Did not start (DNS)
White	Withdrew (WD)
White	Race cancelled (C)
Blank	Did not practice (DNP)
Blank	Did not arrive (DNA)
Blank	Excluded (EX)

†: Did not complete 30 minutes of driving, and was not awarded points

- Tiebreakers: Driver with the highest number of superior finishes is ranked higher

== Manufacturer Standings ==
=== DP Engine ===
Pos	Engine	DAY	MIA	MEX	VIR	LGA	WGL	MID	DAY	BAR	MON	WGL	SON	NJ	MIL	Pts
1	(United States) Pontiac	2	4	1	3	2	3	1	2	6	2	2	1	2	2	442
2	(United States) Ford	6	3	5	4	6	4	4	6	3	1	1	3	1	1	415
3	(Japan) Lexus	1	1	2	1	3	1	8	1	1	5	13	6	9	9	408
4	(Germany) Porsche	10	2	8	7	5	2	2	4	2	3	3	4	3	4	396
5	(Germany) BMW	14	5	16	2	1	12	3	7	11	13	11	13	12	11	313
Pos	Engine	DAY	MIA	MEX	VIR	LGA	WGL	MID	DAY	BAR	MON	WGL	SON	NJ	MIL	Pts

=== DP Chassis ===
Pos	Chassis	DAY	MIA	MEX	VIR	LGA	WGL	MID	DAY	BAR	MON	WGL	SON	NJ	MIL	Pts
1	(United States) Riley	1	1	1	1	1	1	1	1	1	1	1	2	1	1	487
2	(Italy) Dallara	16	14	7	8	8	5	7	6	5	6	7	1	2	2	351
3	(United Kingdom) Lola		11	3	12	9	10	9	3	13	10	5	5	8	5	304
4	(United States) Coyote	10	13	14	15	14	11	12	9	10	2	6	15	11	14	281
5	(United States) Crawford	12	2	13	7	11	16	19	8			19				175
6	(United States) Chase	21														10
Pos	Chassis	DAY	MIA	MEX	VIR	LGA	WGL	MID	DAY	BAR	MON	WGL	SON	NJ	MIL	Pts

=== GT ===
Pos	Manufacturer	DAY	MIA	MEX	VIR	LGA	LRP	WGL	MID	DAY	BAR	MON	NJ	MIL	Pts
1	(United States) Pontiac	7	1	1	1	1	1	2	2	3	4	1	2	1	423
2	(Germany) Porsche	2	2	3	2	2	6	5	1	2	2	4	1	3	401
3	(Japan) Mazda	1	5	5	5	3	2	1	7	1	1	2	11	5	383
4	(United States) Chevrolet	31	20		7	13	12	15	6	18	8	13	21	15	193
5	(Germany) BMW	37							14		13			10	56
6	(United States) Ford	35	7		23					22		17			55
7	(Italy) Ferrari	20	23			19							23	20	50
Pos	Manufacturer	DAY	MIA	MEX	VIR	LGA	LRP	WGL	MID	DAY	BAR	MON	NJ	MIL	Pts
