= 2008 24 Hours of Daytona =

Previous: 2007	Next: 2009
Index: Races | Winners

Track map of Daytona International Speedway

The 2008 Rolex 24 at Daytona was the first round of the 2008 Rolex Sports Car Series season and the 46th running of the 24 Hours of Daytona. It took place at Daytona International Speedway between January 26–27, 2008.

== Qualifying ==
In the Daytona Prototype class, pole position was taken by Oswaldo Negri Jr. in the #60 Michael Shank Racing Ford powered Riley Mk XI with a laptime of 1:40.793. Teammate A. J. Allmendinger locked out the front row for Michael Shank Racing. In the Grand Touring class, the #70 SpeedSource Mazda RX-8 GT with Sylvain Tremblay was fastest with a laptime of 1:50.788. The #56 Mastercar Ferrari F430 Challenge qualified 2nd in the team's debut at Daytona.

== Race ==
The #01 Telmex Chip Ganassi Racing with Felix Sabates Lexus-powered Riley of Scott Pruett, Memo Rojas, Dario Franchitti, and Juan Pablo Montoya led 252 laps and gave Chip Ganassi racing their 3rd successive win at the Daytona 24 Hours. The #01 team took the overall victory by a margin of 2 laps over the #99 GAINSCO/Bob Stallings Racing Pontiac-powered Riley entry. At the start, many cars (including the eventual race winner) had to start from pit lane after changing their tires from wets to slicks. The #70 SpeedSource Mazda RX-8 GT of Sylvain Tremblay, Nick Ham, David Haskell, and Raphael Matos were the winners in GT, completing 664 laps and finishing 9th overall. The overall pace of the race was slowed due to wet weather during the night.

A total of 22 safety car periods neutralized the race for 112 laps.

== Race results ==
Class winners in bold.

Pos	Class	No	Team	Drivers	Chassis	Laps
Pos	Class	No	Team	Drivers	Engine	Laps
1	**DP**	**01**	**(United States) Telmex Chip Ganassi Racing with Felix Sabates**	**(United States) Scott Pruett (Mexico) Memo Rojas (United Kingdom) Dario Franchitti (Colombia) Juan Pablo Montoya**	**Riley Mk XI**	**695**
1	**DP**	**01**	**(United States) Telmex Chip Ganassi Racing with Felix Sabates**	**(United States) Scott Pruett (Mexico) Memo Rojas (United Kingdom) Dario Franchitti (Colombia) Juan Pablo Montoya**	Lexus 5.0L V8	**695**
2	DP	99	(United States) GAINSCO/Bob Stallings Racing	(United States) Jon Fogarty (United States) Alex Gurney (United States) Jimmy Vasser (United States) Jimmie Johnson	Riley Mk XI	693
2	DP	99	(United States) GAINSCO/Bob Stallings Racing	(United States) Jon Fogarty (United States) Alex Gurney (United States) Jimmy Vasser (United States) Jimmie Johnson	Pontiac 5.0L V8	693
3	DP	9	(United States) Penske-Taylor Racing	(Australia) Ryan Briscoe (Brazil) Hélio Castroneves (United States) Kurt Busch	Riley Mk XI	689
3	DP	9	(United States) Penske-Taylor Racing	(Australia) Ryan Briscoe (Brazil) Hélio Castroneves (United States) Kurt Busch	Pontiac 5.0L V8	689
4	DP	76	(United States) Krohn Racing	(United Kingdom) Darren Turner (Sweden) Niclas Jönsson (Brazil) Ricardo Zonta	Proto-Auto Lola B08/70	688
4	DP	76	(United States) Krohn Racing	(United Kingdom) Darren Turner (Sweden) Niclas Jönsson (Brazil) Ricardo Zonta	Pontiac 5.0L V8	688
5	DP	10	(United States) SunTrust Racing	(South Africa) Wayne Taylor (United States) Ricky Taylor (Canada) Michael Valiante (Italy) Max Angelelli	Riley Mk XI	687
5	DP	10	(United States) SunTrust Racing	(South Africa) Wayne Taylor (United States) Ricky Taylor (Canada) Michael Valiante (Italy) Max Angelelli	Pontiac 5.0L V8	687
6	DP	60	(United States) Michael Shank Racing	(United States) Mark Patterson (United States) Graham Rahal (Brazil) Oswaldo Negri Jr. (United Kingdom) Justin Wilson	Riley Mk XI	680
6	DP	60	(United States) Michael Shank Racing	(United States) Mark Patterson (United States) Graham Rahal (Brazil) Oswaldo Negri Jr. (United Kingdom) Justin Wilson	Ford 5.0L V8	680
7	DP	75	(United States) Krohn Racing	(United States) Tracy Krohn (Belgium) Eric van de Poele (United Kingdom) Oliver Gavin	Proto-Auto Lola B08/70	678
7	DP	75	(United States) Krohn Racing	(United States) Tracy Krohn (Belgium) Eric van de Poele (United Kingdom) Oliver Gavin	Pontiac 5.0L V8	678
8	DP	91	(United States) GAINSCO/Bob Stallings Racing	(United States) Jim Matthews (United States) Johnny O'Connell (United States) Ryan Hunter-Reay (Belgium) Marc Goossens	Riley Mk XI	676
8	DP	91	(United States) GAINSCO/Bob Stallings Racing	(United States) Jim Matthews (United States) Johnny O'Connell (United States) Ryan Hunter-Reay (Belgium) Marc Goossens	Pontiac 5.0L V8	676
9	**GT**	**70**	**(United States) SpeedSource**	**(United States) David Haskell (United States) Nick Ham (Canada) Sylvain Tremblay (Brazil) Raphael Matos**	**Mazda RX-8 GT**	**664**
9	**GT**	**70**	**(United States) SpeedSource**	**(United States) David Haskell (United States) Nick Ham (Canada) Sylvain Tremblay (Brazil) Raphael Matos**	Mazda 2.0L 3-Rotor	**664**
10	GT	66	(United States) The Racer's Group	(United States) Bryce Miller (United States) Ted Ballou (United States) Andy Lally (United Kingdom) Richard Westbrook	Porsche 997 GT3 Cup	657
10	GT	66	(United States) The Racer's Group	(United States) Bryce Miller (United States) Ted Ballou (United States) Andy Lally (United Kingdom) Richard Westbrook	Porsche 3.6L Flat-6	657
11	GT	67	(United States) The Racer's Group	(United States) Tim George Jr. (United States) Spencer Pumpelly (United States) Bryan Sellers (France) Romain Dumas (France) Emmanuel Collard	Porsche 997 GT3 Cup	657
11	GT	67	(United States) The Racer's Group	(United States) Tim George Jr. (United States) Spencer Pumpelly (United States) Bryan Sellers (France) Romain Dumas (France) Emmanuel Collard	Porsche 3.6L Flat-6	657
12	GT	64	(United States) The Racer's Group	(United States) Jim Lowe (United States) Jim Pace (United States) Johannes van Overbeek (United States) R. J. Valentine (United Kingdom) Tim Sudgen	Porsche 997 GT3 Cup	656
12	GT	64	(United States) The Racer's Group	(United States) Jim Lowe (United States) Jim Pace (United States) Johannes van Overbeek (United States) R. J. Valentine (United Kingdom) Tim Sudgen	Porsche 3.6L Flat-6	656
13	GT	69	(United States) SpeedSource	(United States) Emil Assentato (United States) Jeff Segal (United States) Nick Longhi (United States) Lonnie Pechnik	Mazda RX-8 GT	653
13	GT	69	(United States) SpeedSource	(United States) Emil Assentato (United States) Jeff Segal (United States) Nick Longhi (United States) Lonnie Pechnik	Mazda 2.0L 3-Rotor	653
14	DP	6	(United States) Michael Shank Racing	(United States) John Pew (United States) A. J. Allmendinger (United States) Burt Frisselle (United Kingdom) Ian James	Riley Mk XI	652
14	DP	6	(United States) Michael Shank Racing	(United States) John Pew (United States) A. J. Allmendinger (United States) Burt Frisselle (United Kingdom) Ian James	Ford 5.0L V8	652
15	DP	09	(United States) Spirit of Daytona Racing	(United States) Guy Cosmo (United States) Michael McDowell (Canada) Marc-Antoine Camirand	Fabcar FDSC/03	652
15	DP	09	(United States) Spirit of Daytona Racing	(United States) Guy Cosmo (United States) Michael McDowell (Canada) Marc-Antoine Camirand	Porsche 3.99L Flat-6	652
16	GT	80	(United States) Synergy Racing	(United States) Mark Greenberg (Republic of Ireland) Damien Faulkner (Belgium) Jan Heylen (Germany) Lance David Arnold	Porsche 997 GT3 Cup	651
16	GT	80	(United States) Synergy Racing	(United States) Mark Greenberg (Republic of Ireland) Damien Faulkner (Belgium) Jan Heylen (Germany) Lance David Arnold	Porsche 3.6L Flat-6	651
17	GT	07	(United States) Banner Racing	(United States) Paul Edwards (United States) Kelly Collins (Denmark) Jan Magnussen	Pontiac GXP.R	647
17	GT	07	(United States) Banner Racing	(United States) Paul Edwards (United States) Kelly Collins (Denmark) Jan Magnussen	Pontiac 6.0L V8	647
18	GT	87	(United States) Team Seattle/Farnbacher Loles Racing	(Germany) Dominik Farnbacher (Germany) Pierre Ehret (Germany) Timo Bernhard (Germany) Dirk Werner	Porsche 997 GT3 Cup	646
18	GT	87	(United States) Team Seattle/Farnbacher Loles Racing	(Germany) Dominik Farnbacher (Germany) Pierre Ehret (Germany) Timo Bernhard (Germany) Dirk Werner	Porsche 3.6L Flat-6	646
19	GT	57	(United States) Stevenson Motorsports	(United States) Andrew Davis (United States) Randy Pobst (United States) Gunnar Jeannette (United Kingdom) Robin Liddell	Pontiac GXP.R	644
19	GT	57	(United States) Stevenson Motorsports	(United States) Andrew Davis (United States) Randy Pobst (United States) Gunnar Jeannette (United Kingdom) Robin Liddell	Pontiac 6.0L V8	644
20	GT	30	(United States) Racer's Edge Motorsports	(United States) Ken Dobson (United States) Robert Thorne (United States) Drew Staveley (United States) Craig Stone	Mazda RX-8 GT	642
20	GT	30	(United States) Racer's Edge Motorsports	(United States) Ken Dobson (United States) Robert Thorne (United States) Drew Staveley (United States) Craig Stone	Mazda 2.0L 3-Rotor	642
21	GT	74	(United States) Autometrics Motorsports	(United States) Bransen Patch (United States) Jim Hamblin (United States) Joe Safina (United States) David Murry (United States) Derek Skea	Porsche 997 GT3 Cup	638
21	GT	74	(United States) Autometrics Motorsports	(United States) Bransen Patch (United States) Jim Hamblin (United States) Joe Safina (United States) David Murry (United States) Derek Skea	Porsche 3.6L Flat-6	638
22	GT	88	(United States) Team Seattle/Farnbacher Loles Racing	(Germany) Pierre Kaffer (Germany) Frank Stippler (Canada) Dave Lacey (Canada) Greg Wilkins (United States) Eric Curran	Porsche 997 GT3 Cup	637
22	GT	88	(United States) Team Seattle/Farnbacher Loles Racing	(Germany) Pierre Kaffer (Germany) Frank Stippler (Canada) Dave Lacey (Canada) Greg Wilkins (United States) Eric Curran	Porsche 3.6L Flat-6	637
23	DP	59	(United States) Brumos Racing	(United States) Hurley Haywood (United States) J. C. France (United States) Terry Borcheller (Portugal) João Barbosa	Riley Mk XI	622
23	DP	59	(United States) Brumos Racing	(United States) Hurley Haywood (United States) J. C. France (United States) Terry Borcheller (Portugal) João Barbosa	Porsche 3.99L Flat-6	622
24 DNF	GT	84	(United States) Team Seattle/Farnbacher Loles Racing	(United States) Chris Bingham (United States) Don Pickering (United States) Bill Cotter (United States) Chris Pennington	Porsche 997 GT3 Cup	637
24 DNF	GT	84	(United States) Team Seattle/Farnbacher Loles Racing	(United States) Chris Bingham (United States) Don Pickering (United States) Bill Cotter (United States) Chris Pennington	Porsche 3.6L Flat-6	637
25 DNF	DP	03	(United States) Vision Racing	(United States) Ed Carpenter (United States) A. J. Foyt IV (United States) John Andretti (Brazil) Vítor Meira (United States) Tony George	Crawford DP08	615
25 DNF	DP	03	(United States) Vision Racing	(United States) Ed Carpenter (United States) A. J. Foyt IV (United States) John Andretti (Brazil) Vítor Meira (United States) Tony George	Porsche 3.99L Flat-6	615
26	GT	44	(United States) Bullet Racing	(United States) Zach Arnold (United States) Dyrk van Zanten Jr. (Canada) Steve Paquette (Canada) Glenn Nixon	Porsche 997 GT3 Cup	615
26	GT	44	(United States) Bullet Racing	(United States) Zach Arnold (United States) Dyrk van Zanten Jr. (Canada) Steve Paquette (Canada) Glenn Nixon	Porsche 3.6L Flat-6	615
27	DP	58	(United States) Brumos Racing	(United States) Darren Law (United States) David Donohue (United States) Buddy Rice	Riley Mk XI	611
27	DP	58	(United States) Brumos Racing	(United States) Darren Law (United States) David Donohue (United States) Buddy Rice	Porsche 3.99L Flat-6	611
28	DP	7	(United States) Sigalsport	(United States) Matt Plumb (United States) Quentin Wahl (France) Stéphan Grégoire (Republic of Ireland) Michael Cullen (Republic of Ireland) Paddy Shovlin	Riley Mk XI	601
28	DP	7	(United States) Sigalsport	(United States) Matt Plumb (United States) Quentin Wahl (France) Stéphan Grégoire (Republic of Ireland) Michael Cullen (Republic of Ireland) Paddy Shovlin	BMW 5.0L V8	601
29	GT	17	(United States) Terra Firma Motorsports	(United States) Ronald Zitza (United States) Gary Jensen (United States) Mark Jensen (United States) Jordan Taylor	Porsche 997 GT3 Cup	599
29	GT	17	(United States) Terra Firma Motorsports	(United States) Ronald Zitza (United States) Gary Jensen (United States) Mark Jensen (United States) Jordan Taylor	Porsche 3.6L Flat-6	599
30	GT	72	(United States) Autohaus Motorsports	(Italy) Max Papis (United States) Tim Lewis Jr. (United States) Craig Stanton (United States) Lawson Aschenbach	Pontiac GXP.R	590
30	GT	72	(United States) Autohaus Motorsports	(Italy) Max Papis (United States) Tim Lewis Jr. (United States) Craig Stanton (United States) Lawson Aschenbach	Pontiac 6.0L V8	590
31	GT	34	(United States) Orbit Racing	(United States) Lance Willsey (United States) Mike Fitzgerald (United States) Tom Papadopoulos (United Kingdom) Johnny Mowlem	Porsche 997 GT3 Cup	589
31	GT	34	(United States) Orbit Racing	(United States) Lance Willsey (United States) Mike Fitzgerald (United States) Tom Papadopoulos (United Kingdom) Johnny Mowlem	Porsche 3.6L Flat-6	589
32	GT	65	(United States) The Racer's Group	(United States) Russ Oasis (United States) Tom Atherton (United States) Jim Stout (United States) Jason Daskalos (United States) Tommy Archer	Porsche 997 GT3 Cup	585
32	GT	65	(United States) The Racer's Group	(United States) Russ Oasis (United States) Tom Atherton (United States) Jim Stout (United States) Jason Daskalos (United States) Tommy Archer	Porsche 3.6L Flat-6	585
33	GT	86	(United States) Team Seattle/Farnbacher Loles Racing	(United States) Eric Lux (United States) Leh Keen (Germany) Sascha Maassen (Germany) Wolf Henzler (Germany) Jörg Bergmeister	Porsche 997 GT3 Cup	580
33	GT	86	(United States) Team Seattle/Farnbacher Loles Racing	(United States) Eric Lux (United States) Leh Keen (Germany) Sascha Maassen (Germany) Wolf Henzler (Germany) Jörg Bergmeister	Porsche 3.6L Flat-6	580
34	GT	52	(Italy) Mastercar	(Italy) Joe Castellano (United States) Fred Machado (Hong Kong) Ma Chi Min (Italy) Roberto Ragazzi (Italy) Constantino Bertuzzi	Ferrari F430 Challenge	578
34	GT	52	(Italy) Mastercar	(Italy) Joe Castellano (United States) Fred Machado (Hong Kong) Ma Chi Min (Italy) Roberto Ragazzi (Italy) Constantino Bertuzzi	Ferrari 4.3L V8	578
35	GT	85	(United States) Team Seattle/Farnbacher Loles Racing	(United States) Don Kitch Jr. (United States) Steve Miller (United States) Chris Pallis (Canada) Ross Bentley	Porsche 997 GT3 Cup	572
35	GT	85	(United States) Team Seattle/Farnbacher Loles Racing	(United States) Don Kitch Jr. (United States) Steve Miller (United States) Chris Pallis (Canada) Ross Bentley	Porsche 3.6L Flat-6	572
36 DNF	DP	23	(United States) Alex Job Racing	(United States) Bill Auberlen (United States) Joey Hand (United States) Patrick Long (United Kingdom) Andy Wallace	Crawford DP08	569
36 DNF	DP	23	(United States) Alex Job Racing	(United States) Bill Auberlen (United States) Joey Hand (United States) Patrick Long (United Kingdom) Andy Wallace	Porsche 3.99L Flat-6	569
37	GT	06	(United States) Banner Racing	(United States) Leighton Reese (United Kingdom) Robert Nearn (United States) Marc Bunting (United States) Andy Pilgrim	Pontiac GXP.R	564
37	GT	06	(United States) Banner Racing	(United States) Leighton Reese (United Kingdom) Robert Nearn (United States) Marc Bunting (United States) Andy Pilgrim	Pontiac 6.0L V8	564
38	GT	81	(United States) Synergy Racing	(United States) Steve Johnson (Netherlands) Patrick Huisman (Netherlands) Robert Doornbos (Austria) Richard Lietz	Porsche 997 GT3 Cup	558
38	GT	81	(United States) Synergy Racing	(United States) Steve Johnson (Netherlands) Patrick Huisman (Netherlands) Robert Doornbos (Austria) Richard Lietz	Porsche 3.6L Flat-6	558
39	GT	40	(United States) Dempsey Racing	(United States) Joe Foster (United States) Patrick Dempsey (United States) Charles Espenlaub (United States) Romeo Kapudija (Canada) Scott Maxwell	Mazda RX-8 GT	552
39	GT	40	(United States) Dempsey Racing	(United States) Joe Foster (United States) Patrick Dempsey (United States) Charles Espenlaub (United States) Romeo Kapudija (Canada) Scott Maxwell	Mazda 2.0L 3-Rotor	552
40	GT	68	(United States) The Racer's Group	(United States) Michael Gomez (United States) Michael Auriemma (United States) John Mayes (United States) Scott Schroeder (United States) Brent Milner	Porsche 997 GT3 Cup	550
40	GT	68	(United States) The Racer's Group	(United States) Michael Gomez (United States) Michael Auriemma (United States) John Mayes (United States) Scott Schroeder (United States) Brent Milner	Porsche 3.6L Flat-6	550
41	DP	77	(United States) Doran Racing	(United States) Memo Gidley (Italy) Fabrizio Gollin (Switzerland) Gabriele Gardel (United States) Brad Jaeger	Doran JE4	546
41	DP	77	(United States) Doran Racing	(United States) Memo Gidley (Italy) Fabrizio Gollin (Switzerland) Gabriele Gardel (United States) Brad Jaeger	Ford 5.0L V8	546
42 DNF	DP	3	(United States) Southard Motorsports	(United States) Shane Lewis (United States) Bill Lester (United States) Ted Christopher (United States) Alex Barron	Riley Mk XI	527
42 DNF	DP	3	(United States) Southard Motorsports	(United States) Shane Lewis (United States) Bill Lester (United States) Ted Christopher (United States) Alex Barron	Lexus 5.0L V8	527
43 DNF	GT	14	(United States) Autometrics Motorsports	(United States) Cory Friedman (United States) Mac McGehee (United States) Anthony Lazzaro (Germany) Ralf Kelleners	Porsche 997 GT3 Cup	524
43 DNF	GT	14	(United States) Autometrics Motorsports	(United States) Cory Friedman (United States) Mac McGehee (United States) Anthony Lazzaro (Germany) Ralf Kelleners	Porsche 3.6L Flat-6	524
44 DNF	DP	02	(United States) Target Chip Ganassi Racing with Felix Sabates	(United Kingdom) Dan Wheldon (New Zealand) Scott Dixon (United Kingdom) Alex Lloyd (Mexico) Salvador Durán	Riley Mk XI	515
44 DNF	DP	02	(United States) Target Chip Ganassi Racing with Felix Sabates	(United Kingdom) Dan Wheldon (New Zealand) Scott Dixon (United Kingdom) Alex Lloyd (Mexico) Salvador Durán	Lexus 5.0L V8	515
45	GT	21	(United States) Matt Connolly Motorsports	(United States) Hal Prewitt (United States) Spencer Trenery (United States) Vic Rice (Italy) Diego Alessi (Australia) Karl Reindler	Pontiac GTO.R	513
45	GT	21	(United States) Matt Connolly Motorsports	(United States) Hal Prewitt (United States) Spencer Trenery (United States) Vic Rice (Italy) Diego Alessi (Australia) Karl Reindler	Pontiac 6.0L V8	513
46 DNF	GT	62	(United States) The Racer's Group	(United States) Claudio Burtin (United States) Jack Baldwin (United States) Scott Tucker (United States) Ed Zabinski (Austria) Martin Ragginger	Porsche 997 GT3 Cup	511
46 DNF	GT	62	(United States) The Racer's Group	(United States) Claudio Burtin (United States) Jack Baldwin (United States) Scott Tucker (United States) Ed Zabinski (Austria) Martin Ragginger	Porsche 3.6L Flat-6	511
47 DNF	GT	27	(United States) O'Connell Racing	(United States) Kevin O'Connell (United States) Kevin Roush (United States) Kris Wilson (United States) Hugh Plumb	Porsche 997 GT3 Cup	473
47 DNF	GT	27	(United States) O'Connell Racing	(United States) Kevin O'Connell (United States) Kevin Roush (United States) Kris Wilson (United States) Hugh Plumb	Porsche 3.6L Flat-6	473
48 DNF	DP	61	(United States) AIM Autosport	(United States) Colin Braun (United States) Brian Frisselle (Canada) Mark Wilkins (Canada) Andrew Ranger	Riley Mk XI	448
48 DNF	DP	61	(United States) AIM Autosport	(United States) Colin Braun (United States) Brian Frisselle (Canada) Mark Wilkins (Canada) Andrew Ranger	Ford 5.0L V8	448
49 DNF	GT	29	(United States) Alegra Motorsport	(United States) Jake Rosenzweig (United States) Bob Woodman (Canada) Louis-Philippe Dumoulin (United States) Scooter Gabel (United States) Chris Gleason	Porsche 997 GT3 Cup	418
49 DNF	GT	29	(United States) Alegra Motorsport	(United States) Jake Rosenzweig (United States) Bob Woodman (Canada) Louis-Philippe Dumoulin (United States) Scooter Gabel (United States) Chris Gleason	Porsche 3.6L Flat-6	418
50 DNF	GT	43	(United States) Team Sahlen	(United States) Will Nonnamaker (United States) Wayne Nonnamaker (United States) Joe Nonnamaker (United States) Joe Sahlen	Mazda RX-8 GT	401
50 DNF	GT	43	(United States) Team Sahlen	(United States) Will Nonnamaker (United States) Wayne Nonnamaker (United States) Joe Nonnamaker (United States) Joe Sahlen	Mazda 2.0L 3-Rotor	401
51 DNF	GT	83	(United States) Team Seattle/Farnbacher Loles Racing	(United States) C. R. Crews (United States) Russell Walker (United States) Peter Ludwig (United States) Ben McCrackin (Germany) Tim Bergmeister	Porsche 997 GT3 Cup	397
51 DNF	GT	83	(United States) Team Seattle/Farnbacher Loles Racing	(United States) C. R. Crews (United States) Russell Walker (United States) Peter Ludwig (United States) Ben McCrackin (Germany) Tim Bergmeister	Porsche 3.6L Flat-6	397
52 DNF	GT	26	(United States) Gotham Competition	(United States) Jerome Jacalone (United States) Joe Jacalone (United States) Jim Michaelian (United States) Bob Michaelian (United States) Scooter Gabel	Porsche 997 GT3 Cup	364
52 DNF	GT	26	(United States) Gotham Competition	(United States) Jerome Jacalone (United States) Joe Jacalone (United States) Jim Michaelian (United States) Bob Michaelian (United States) Scooter Gabel	Porsche 3.6L Flat-6	364
53 DNF	GT	89	(United States) Team Seattle/Farnbacher Loles Racing	(Italy) Luca Drudi (Italy) Raffaele Giammaria (Italy) Gabrio Rosa (Italy) Giacomo Petrobelli (Germany) Jörg Hardt	Porsche 997 GT3 Cup	284
53 DNF	GT	89	(United States) Team Seattle/Farnbacher Loles Racing	(Italy) Luca Drudi (Italy) Raffaele Giammaria (Italy) Gabrio Rosa (Italy) Giacomo Petrobelli (Germany) Jörg Hardt	Porsche 3.6L Flat-6	284
54 DNF	GT	50	(United States) Blackforest Motorsports	(Canada) John Farano (United States) Carl Jensen (United States) John Cloud (United States) Boris Said (United States) James Bradley	Ford Mustang	255
54 DNF	GT	50	(United States) Blackforest Motorsports	(Canada) John Farano (United States) Carl Jensen (United States) John Cloud (United States) Boris Said (United States) James Bradley	Ford 5.0L V8	255
55 DNF	DP	2	(United States) SAMAX Motorsport	(United States) Henri Zogaib (Germany) Mike Rockenfeller (Germany) Lucas Luhr (United Kingdom) Allan McNish	Riley Mk XI	233
55 DNF	DP	2	(United States) SAMAX Motorsport	(United States) Henri Zogaib (Germany) Mike Rockenfeller (Germany) Lucas Luhr (United Kingdom) Allan McNish	Pontiac 5.0L V8	233
56 DNF	DP	31	(United States) Matt Connolly Motorsports	(United States) Seth Ingram (Germany) Mirco Schultis (United States) Bob Frost (Czech Republic) Miroslav Konopka (Italy) Ettore Contini	Chase CCE	231
56 DNF	DP	31	(United States) Matt Connolly Motorsports	(United States) Seth Ingram (Germany) Mirco Schultis (United States) Bob Frost (Czech Republic) Miroslav Konopka (Italy) Ettore Contini	Pontiac 5.0L V8	231
57 DNF	GT	15	(United States) Blackforest Motorsports	(Canada) David Empringham (Canada) Jean-François Dumoulin (United States) Tom Nastasi (United States) Boris Said	Ford Mustang	177
57 DNF	GT	15	(United States) Blackforest Motorsports	(Canada) David Empringham (Canada) Jean-François Dumoulin (United States) Tom Nastasi (United States) Boris Said	Ford 5.0L V8	177
58 DNF	DP	16	(United States) Cheever Racing	(Italy) Matteo Bobbi (Spain) Antonio García (France) Stéphane Ortelli (Italy) Fabio Babini	Coyote CC/08	170
58 DNF	DP	16	(United States) Cheever Racing	(Italy) Matteo Bobbi (Spain) Antonio García (France) Stéphane Ortelli (Italy) Fabio Babini	Pontiac 5.0L V8	170
59 DNF	GT	90	(United States) Automatic Racing	(United States) Jep Thornton (United States) Tom Long (United States) Joe Varde (United States) David Russell	BMW M6	163
59 DNF	GT	90	(United States) Automatic Racing	(United States) Jep Thornton (United States) Tom Long (United States) Joe Varde (United States) David Russell	BMW 5.0L V10	163
60 DNF	GT	22	(United States) Alegra Motorsports	(United States) Carlos de Quesada (United States) Nathan Swartzbaugh (France) Patrick Pilet (Germany) Marc Basseng	Porsche 997 GT3 Cup	149
60 DNF	GT	22	(United States) Alegra Motorsports	(United States) Carlos de Quesada (United States) Nathan Swartzbaugh (France) Patrick Pilet (Germany) Marc Basseng	Porsche 3.6L Flat-6	149
61 DNF	DP	11	(United States) SAMAX Motorsport	(Czech Republic) Tomáš Enge (Venezuela) Milka Duno (Switzerland) Harold Primat (United Kingdom) Ryan Dalziel	Riley Mk XI	97
61 DNF	DP	11	(United States) SAMAX Motorsport	(Czech Republic) Tomáš Enge (Venezuela) Milka Duno (Switzerland) Harold Primat (United Kingdom) Ryan Dalziel	Pontiac 5.0L V8	97
62 DNF	GT	08	(United States) Goldin Motorsports	(United States) Steve Goldin (United States) Keith Goldin (United States) Jim Meassick (United States) Squeak Kennedy	Mazda RX-8 GT	83
62 DNF	GT	08	(United States) Goldin Motorsports	(United States) Steve Goldin (United States) Keith Goldin (United States) Jim Meassick (United States) Squeak Kennedy	Mazda 2.0L 3-Rotor	83
63 DNF	DP	12	(United States) RVO Motorsports	(United Kingdom) Derek Bell (United Kingdom) Justin Bell (Estonia) Tõnis Kasemets (United States) Paul Dallenbach (United States) Roger Schramm	Riley Mk XI	65
63 DNF	DP	12	(United States) RVO Motorsports	(United Kingdom) Derek Bell (United Kingdom) Justin Bell (Estonia) Tõnis Kasemets (United States) Paul Dallenbach (United States) Roger Schramm	Pontiac 5.0L V8	65
64 DNF	GT	56	(Italy) Mastercar	(Hong Kong) Matthew Marsh (San Marino) Christian Montanari (Italy) Thomas Biagi (Switzerland) Fabio Venier (Spain) Luis Monzon	Ferrari F430 Challenge	55
64 DNF	GT	56	(Italy) Mastercar	(Hong Kong) Matthew Marsh (San Marino) Christian Montanari (Italy) Thomas Biagi (Switzerland) Fabio Venier (Spain) Luis Monzon	Ferrari 4.3L V8	55
65 DNF	DP	51	(United States) Cheever Racing	(United Kingdom) Tom Kimber-Smith (United Kingdom) Mike Newton (Brazil) Thomas Erdos (United States) Scott Mayer (United States) Brent Sherman	Coyote CC/08	45
65 DNF	DP	51	(United States) Cheever Racing	(United Kingdom) Tom Kimber-Smith (United Kingdom) Mike Newton (Brazil) Thomas Erdos (United States) Scott Mayer (United States) Brent Sherman	Pontiac 5.0L V8	45
66 DNF	GT	63	(United States) The Racer's Group	(Canada) Pierre Bourque (Canada) Hima Maher (United States) Duncan Ende (United States) Ron Yarab Jr.	Porsche 997 GT3 Cup	31
66 DNF	GT	63	(United States) The Racer's Group	(Canada) Pierre Bourque (Canada) Hima Maher (United States) Duncan Ende (United States) Ron Yarab Jr.	Porsche 3.6L Flat-6	31
