= Mark Wilkins (racing driver) =

Canadian professional racing driver

- Nationality: (Canada) Canadian
- Born: May 9, 1983 (age 43) Toronto, Canada
- Categorisation: FIA Gold (until 2015, 2019–); FIA Silver (2016–2018)

Mark Wilkins (born May 9, 1983 in Toronto) is a Canadian professional racing driver who is currently a factory driver for Hyundai Motorsport and Bryan Herta Autosport (2018-Pres.) participating in the IMSA Michelin Pilot Challenge. He previously raced for Acura in Pirelli World Challenge and the IMSA WeatherTech SportsCar Championship.

Before racing in Grand-Am, Wilkins raced in the North American Fran Am 2000 Pro Championship with a best championship position of fourth in 2004. He then moved to the Star Mazda series for two seasons with the occasional Grand-Am race.

It was not until 2007 when Wilkins took part in a full season of Grand-Am when he finished fifteenth overall with no wins.

2008 was a breakthrough season for both Wilkins, co-driver Brian Frisselle and the rest of the AIM Autosport team in the championship. After four consecutive top ten finishes between rounds four and seven, their first real shot at victory was at Barber in the ninth round. With twenty minutes remaining, their car's engine failed while leading. At the very next race in Montreal, the team achieved their first race victory in one of the most chaotic final laps in history.

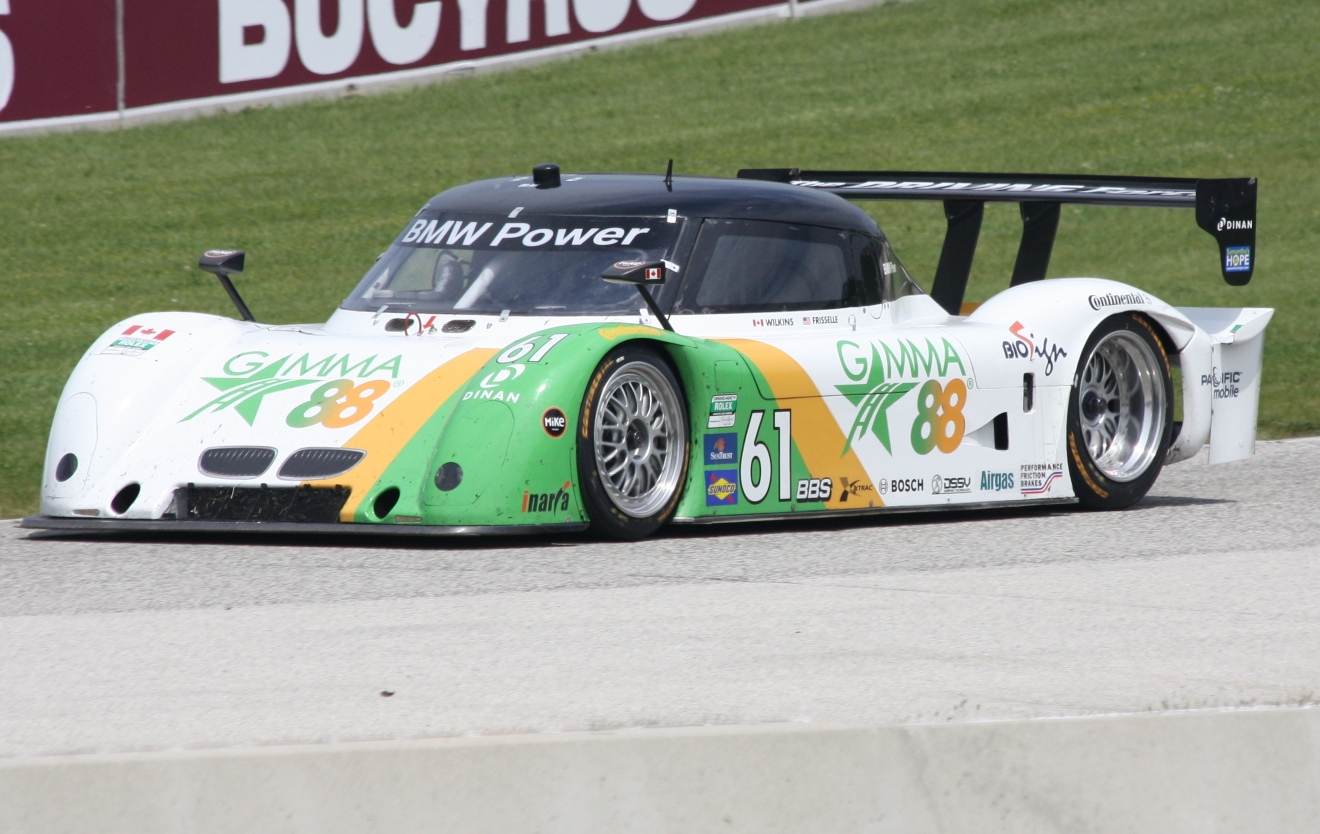
AIM 2011 Rolex Sports Car

Starting the last lap in third, Wilkins had the cars of Joey Hand and Darren Law in front of him. Coming out of turn eight, Hand's car ran out of fuel denying him and Bill Auberlen victory. Law assumed the lead but he too was running out of fuel. Having just negotiated the final chicane, Law's car stuttered and ran out. Wilkins and third-placed Antonio García had to take evasive action to avoid the Brumos Porsche with Wilkins going right and García being balked on the left just inches before the line. Wilkins held off the Spaniard by 0.064 seconds, in the closest finish in the series' history. They then followed up that win with another the following weekend, at Watkins Glen International.

In 2009, Brian Frisselle left AIM for SunTrust Racing, so Wilkins' co-driver was Brian's brother, Burt Frisselle. The pairing had a solid season, finishing nine of the twelve races in the top ten and claiming ninth in the championship.

For 2010, Wilkins joined American Le Mans Series team Level 5 Motorsports in the Le Mans Prototype Challenge category. Teamed with full season drivers Scott Tucker and Christophe Bouchot, the trio would claim the 2010 12 Hours of Sebring as well as Laguna Seca, handily winning the teams championship. Wilkins would return in 2012 in Pirelli World Challenge, this time as a factory driver for Kia. Despite running a limited schedule with a new car, Wilkins would pick up his first win at Mosport and finish 7th in standings. Although Wilkins would not win any drivers' titles, he did pick up multiple victories as well as the GTS manufacturers' championship for Kia in 2014.

With Kia departing PWC, Wilkins was left a free agent for 2015. For that year, he was tabbed by CORE Autosport to pilot their No. 54 ORECA for the IMSA North American Endurance Cup at Daytona. Unfortunately, the team would crash out of contention for the PC class victory in the late stages. Wilkins would reunite with CORE for 2016, taking home his second Sebring 12 Hour victory. In 2017, Mark was hired by Acura Motorsports as their factory endurance driver in IMSA.
