= Eric Lux (racing driver) =

American racing driver

- Nationality: (United States) American
- Born: March 22, 1988 (age 38) Buffalo, New York, U.S.

WeatherTech SportsCar Championship career
- Current team: DragonSpeed
- Categorisation: FIA Silver (until 2020); FIA Bronze (2021–)
- Starts: 138
- Championships: 1
- Wins: 10
- Podiums: 29
- Poles: 6

Previous series
- American Le Mans Series; Rolex Sports Car Series

Awards
- IMSA Rookie of The Year

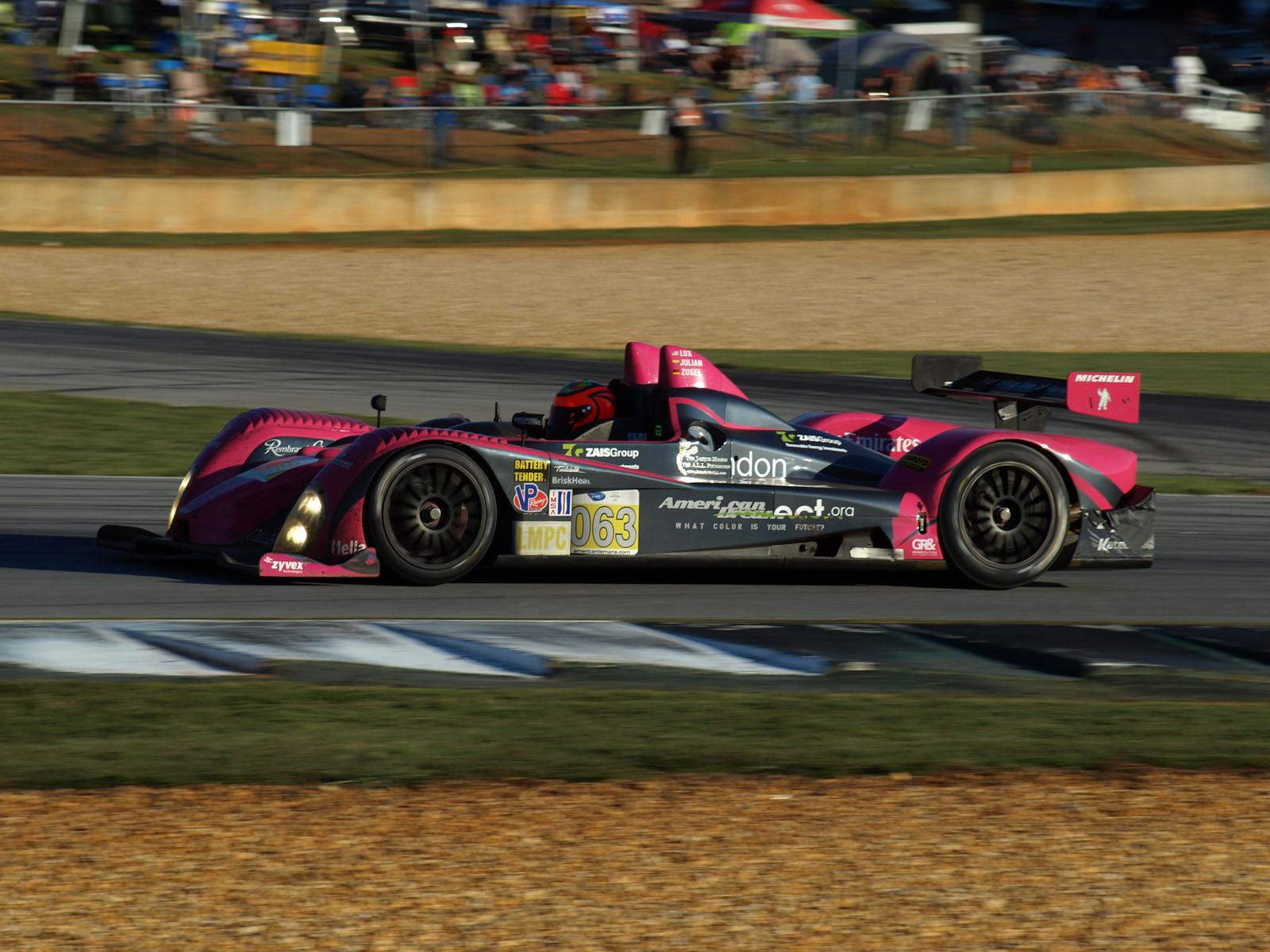

Eric Lux (born March 22, 1988) is an American race car driver, entrepreneur, and investor from Buffalo, New York. Lux is the 2011 IMSA Drivers' Champion, the 2011 IMSA Rookie of The Year, and in 2022, Lux and teammates Pato O'Ward, Colton Herta, and Devlin DeFrancesco won the 60th Anniversary of the Rolex 24 Hours at Daytona in the Le Mans Prototype 2 category for DragonSpeed.

Lux was one of the first 16-year-old drivers to finish the Rolex 24 Hours of Daytona, and the youngest winner in the Rolex Sports Car Series.

Throughout his career he has competed in IMSA, the FIA World Endurance Championship, SRO competition, Rolex Sportscar Series, American Le Mans Series, 24 Hours Series, NASCAR, and the 24 Hours of Le Mans.

Outside of motorsports, Lux serves as President of Rembrandt Charms, a North American jewelry manufacturer headquartered in Buffalo, New York. Having worked in the family business since childhood and a full-time since 2010, he has held responsibilities across manufacturing, operations, distribution, sales, marketing, acquisitions, and executive management in both the United States and Canada.

Lux is also an active angel investor in startup companies and is known for his interests in entrepreneurship and motorsports. Lux is a former snowboard instructor and freestyle coach. He competed in United States Amateur Snowboard Association (USASA) events and earned multiple podium finishes in regional and national competition. He remains active in big-mountain snowboarding and frequently rides in the Alaskan backcountry.

2005–2011 Rolex Sports Car Series.

2008–2008 NASCAR Camping World Series.

2010–2013 IMSA American Le Mans Series.

2013–2013 FIA World Endurance Championship.

2014–2014 IMSA WeatherTech SportsCar Championship.

2015–2015 SRO GT World Challenge Series.

2017–2019 SRO GT World Challenge Series.

2018–2026 IMSA WeatherTech Sportscar Championship.

== Motorsports career ==
- 138 Professional Race Starts.
- 1st Place Driver’s Championship - IMSA.
- Top-3 Driver’s Championship 2× - IMSA.
- Top-5 Driver’s Championships 2× - IMSA.
- Rookie of The Year - IMSA.
- Rolex 24 Hours at Daytona LMP2 IMSA Winner 2022.
- 10 Wins in IMSA, WEC, ALMS, SRO & Rolex Sports Car Series.
- 29 Podium finishes in IMSA, WEC, ALMS, SRO & Rolex Sports Car Series.
- 52 Top-5 finishes in IMSA, WEC, ALMS, SRO & Rolex Sports Car Series.
- 68 Top-10 finishes in IMSA, WEC, ALMS, SRO & Rolex Sports Car Series.
- 24 Hours of Le Mans, 1 start, best result 10th.
- 24 Hours of Daytona, 14 starts, best results 1st and 3rd.
- 6 Hours of Watkins Glen, 10 starts, best results 1st and 3rd.
- 10 Hours of Petit Le Mans, 4 starts, best result 2nd.
- 12 Hours of Sebring, 5 starts, best results 3rd twice.
- 12 Hours of Bathurst, 2 starts, best result 5th.
- 6 Hours of Shanghai, 1 start, best result 5th.
- 24 Hours of Dubai, 1 start, best result 5th.
- One of the first 16-year-old drivers to compete & finish the 24 Hours of Daytona in 2005.
- Youngest Grand-Am Cup GS Winner during 2006 Daytona 200.
- Has raced over 50 different GT, prototype and stockcars since 2004.
- Has raced with over 30 different racing teams since 2004.
- Youngest licensed racing driver in the United States in 2003 at 14 years old.
- Multiple regional and national karting championships and wins including in the World Karting Association.

Series & Licenses Held: FIA World Endurance Championship (WEC) Int’l Motor Sports Association (IMSA) Intercontinental GT Series Pirelli World Challenge (PWC) NASCAR East Series Sports Car Club of America (SCCA) NASCAR Nationwide Series Intercontinental Le Mans Cup (ILMC) NASCAR Camping World Truck Series United Sports Car Championship (USC) ARCA American Le Mans Series (ALMS) HSCR (Historic Stock Car Racing) Porsche Club of America (PCA) Historic Sports Car Racing – Super (HSR) Grand-American Rolex Sports Car Series Sports Car Vintage Racing – Super (SVRA) Grand-American Continental Tire Challenge Series Mazda MX-5 Challenge Series Creventic 24 Hours Series

Cars Raced: 2026 Porsche 992 GT3 R Evo, 2022 Oreca LMP2 Gibson Powered, 2021 Ligier LMP3 Nissan Powered, 2021 Oreca LMP2 Gibson Powered, 2020 Lamborghini Huracan GT3, 2020 Oreca LMP2 Gibson Powered, 2017 Porsche 911 GT3 Cup R, 2017 Multimatic-Riley (LMP2) Gibson Powered, 2017 Aston Martin GT4, 2016 Ligier LMP3-2 Nissan Powered, 2014 GT3 Mercedes SLS, 2014 GT3 Audi R8 LMS Ultra, 2014 Oreca FLM Prototype (LMPC) Chevy Powered, 2013 Audi R8 Grand-Am, 2013 Zytech Prototype (LMP2) Nissan/Caterham, 2012 Zytech Prototype (LMP2) Nissan Powered, 2012 Morgan/Oak Prototype (LMP2) Nissan Powered, 2012 Oreca FLM Prototype (LMPC) Chevy Powered, 2012 GT3 Audi R8 LMS Ultra, 2011 Lola B09 86 Prototype (LMP1) Mazda Powered, 2011 Oreca FLM Prototype (LMPC) Chevy Powered, 2010 Oreca FLM Prototype (LMPC) Chevy Powered, 2010 Mazda RX-8 GT, 2010 Corvette GT, 2010 Porsche 997 GT, 2009 Porsche 997 GT, 2009 Porsche Cayman GS, 2009 Porsche Cayman GS, 2009 Ford Mustang GT, 2008 Toyota Camping World NASCAR, 2008 Porsche 997 RSR GT, 2008 Porsche 997 GT, 2007 Lexus Riley Daytona Prototype, 2007 Dodge ARCA Re-Max NASCAR, 2007 Pontiac GXP.R GT, 2007 Porsche 997 GT, 2006 Porsche 997 GT, 2006 MX-5 Mazda, 2005 BMW M3 GS, 2005 Porsche GT3 Cup GT, 2005 Porsche 996 GT, 2003 Panoz GTRA, 2000 Chevy Winston Cup NASCAR, 1994 Porsche 993GT, 1993 Porsche 962 Prototype, 1988 BMW E30, 1975 Porsche 911 RSR 3.8L GT, 1973 Porsche 911 RS 3.0L GT, 1973 Porsche 911 2.5L GT, 1972 Porsche 914 GT, 1967 Porsche 911 R 2.0L GT.

=== NASCAR ===
(key) (Bold – Pole position awarded by qualifying time. Italics – Pole position earned by points standings or practice time. * – Most laps led.)

==== NASCAR Camping World East Series ====
Year	Team	No.	Make	1	2	3	4	5	6	7	8	9	10	11	12	13	NKNPSEC	Pts	Ref
2008	Eddie Sharp Racing	22	Toyota	GRE	IOW	SBO	GLN	NHA	TMP; 23	NSH	ADI	LRP	MFD; 11	NHA	DOV	STA	45th	224	

==== WeatherTech SportsCar Championship results ====
Year	Entrant	Class	Chassis	Engine	1	2	3	4	5	6	7	8	9	10	11	Rank	Points
2014	Starworks Motorsport	PC	Oreca FLM09	Chevrolet LS3 6.2 L V8	DAY; 5											26th	51
2014	8 Star Motorsports	PC	Oreca FLM09	Chevrolet LS3 6.2 L V8		SEB; 5	LGA	KAN; 3	WGL; 10	IMS	ELK; 7	VIR	AUS	PET		26th	51
2018	BAR1 Motorsports	P	Riley Mk. 30	Gibson GK428 4.2 L V8	DAY; 14	SEB	LBH	MDO	DET	WGL	MOS	ELK	LGA	PET		59th	17
2019	PR1/Mathiasen Motorsports	LMP2	Oreca 07	Gibson GK428 4.2 L V8	DAY	SEB	MDO 1	WGL 1	MOS	ELK	LGA	PET				7th	70
2020	Precision Performance Motorsports	GTD	Lamborghini Huracán GT3 Evo	Lamborghini DGF 5.2 L V10	DAY; 15	DAY	SEB	ELK	VIR	ATL	MDO	CLT	PET	LGA	SEB	58th	16
2021	DragonSpeed USA	LMP2	Oreca 07	Gibson GK428 4.2 L V8	DAY; 3†	SEB	WGL	WGL	ELK	LGA	PET					11th	322
2022	DragonSpeed USA	LMP2	Oreca 07	Gibson GK428 4.2 L V8	DAY; 1†	SEB	LGA	MDO	WGL	ELK	PET					NC†	0†
2023	Rick Ware Racing	LMP2	Oreca 07	Gibson GK428 4.2 L V8	DAY; 6†	SEB; 7	MON; 5	WGL; 9	ELK	IMS	PET					17th	770
2024	DragonSpeed USA	LMP2	Oreca 07	Gibson GK428 4.2 L V8	DAY; 7	SEB	WGL; 10	MOS	ELK	IMS	PET					34th	492
2026	RS1	GTD	Porsche 911 GT3 R (992.2)	Porsche M97/80 4.2 L Flat-6	DAY	SEB	LBH	LGA	WGL; 9	MOS	ELK	VIR	IMS	PET		71st	220

^{†} Points only counted towards the Michelin Endurance Cup, and not the overall LMP2 Championship.

=== 24 Hours of Daytona results ===
Year	Team	Co-drivers	Car	Class	Laps	Pos.	Class Pos.
2005	(United States) Team Sahlen	(United States) Ronald Zitza (United States) Bradley Blum (United States) Wes Allen (Puerto Rico) Victor Gonzalez Jr.	Porsche 996 GT3 Cup	GT	637	21st	9th
2006	(United States) Tafel Racing	(United States) Andrew Davis (United States) Charles Espenlaub (United States) Jim Tafel (United States) Michael Cawley	Porsche 997 GT3 Cup	GT	634	25th	12th
2007	(United States) Tafel Racing	(Germany) Wolf Henzler (Germany) Dominik Farnbacher (United States) Jim Tafel	Riley Mk Xl	GT	544	39th	20th
2008	(United States) Team Seattle/Farnbacher Loles Racing	(United States) Leh Keen (Germany) Sascha Maassen (Germany) Wolf Henzler (Germany) Jörg Bergmeister	Porsche 997 GT3 Cup	GT	580	33rd	19th
2009	(United States) Farnbacher Loles Racing	(Germany) Dominik Farnbacher (Hong Kong) Matthew Marsh (United States) Kevin Roush	Porsche 997 GT3 Cup	GT	688	13th	5th
2010	(United States) JLowe Racing	(United States) Jim Lowe (United States) Jim Pace (United Kingdom) Tim Sugden (United Kingdom) James Walker	Porsche 997 GT3 Cup	GT	100	42nd	27th
2011	(United States) Bullet Racing	(Hong Kong) Darryl O'Young (United Kingdom) James Walker (United States) Brian Wong	Porsche 997 GT3 Cup	GT	328	41st	25th
2014	(United States) Starworks Motorsport	(Netherlands) Renger van der Zande (United Kingdom) Sam Bird (Germany) Mirco Schultis	Oreca FLM09-Chevrolet	PC	659	24th	5th
2018	(United States) BAR1 Motorsports	(United States) Marc Drumwright (United States) Brendan Gaughan (Venezuela) Alex Popow	Riley Mk. 30-Gibson	P	642	42nd	14th
2020	(United States) Precision Performance Motorsports	(United States) Brandon Gdovic (United Kingdom) Johnathan Hoggard (United States) Mark Kvamme	Lamborghini Huracán GT3 Evo	GTD	608	34th	15th
2021	(United States) DragonSpeed USA	(Canada) Devlin DeFrancesco (Germany) Christopher Mies (Germany) Fabian Schiller	Oreca 07-Gibson	LMP2	783	9th	**3rd**
2022	(United States) DragonSpeed USA	(Canada) Devlin DeFrancesco (United States) Colton Herta (Mexico) Pato O'Ward	Oreca 07-Gibson	LMP2	751	5th	**1st**
2023	(United States) Rick Ware Racing	(Canada) Devlin DeFrancesco (United States) Austin Cindric (Brazil) Pietro Fittipaldi	Oreca 07-Gibson	LMP2	758	12th	6th
2024	(United States) DragonSpeed USA	(Mexico) Sebastián Álvarez (Australia) James Allen (Cayman Islands) Kyffin Simpson	Oreca 07-Gibson	LMP2	764	15th	7th

=== 24 Hours of Le Mans result ===
Year	Team	Co-Drivers	Car	Class	Laps	Pos.	Class Pos.
2013	(United Kingdom) Greaves Motorsport	(United States) Alexander Rossi (United Kingdom) Tom Kimber-Smith	Zytek Z11SN-Nissan	LMP2	307	23rd	10th
