= Dominik Farnbacher =

German sports car racing driver

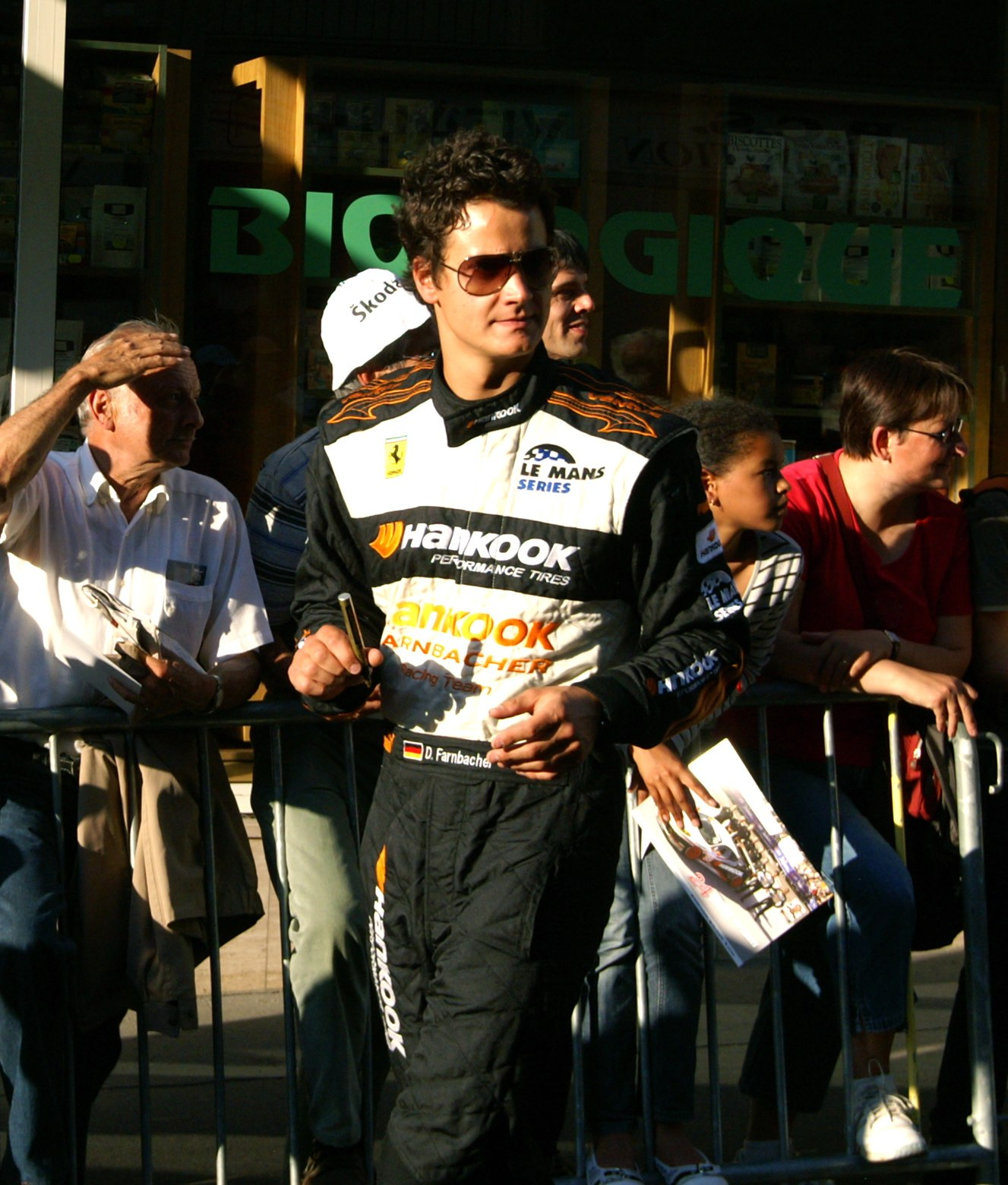
- Farnbacher at Le Mans in 2010
- Nationality: (Germany) German
- Born: 26 September 1984 (age 42) Ansbach, West Germany
- Relatives: Mario Farnbacher (brother)

United SportsCar Championship career
- Debut season: 2006
- Current team: SRT Motorsports
- Categorisation: FIA Gold
- Car number: 91
- Starts: 54
- Wins: 5
- Poles: 0
- Best finish: 7th (GT) in 2013 (as ALMS)

Previous series
- 1996–2000 2001 2002–2006 2004 2006, 2009–2011 2012 2006–2013: Karting; Formula BMW Junior; Porsche Carrera Cup Germany; Porsche Supercup; Le Mans Series; World Endurance Championship; American LeMans Series

24 Hours of Le Mans career
- Years: 2006, 2009–2013
- Teams: Seikel Motorsport, Team Farnbacher, Luxury Racing, SRT Motorsports
- Best finish: 12th (2010)

Dominik Farnbacher (born 26 September 1984 in Ansbach) is a German sports car racing driver, and currently an SRT factory driver, driving an SRT Viper GTS-R in the Tudor United SportsCar Championship.

== Career ==
After beginning his career in karting, Farnbacher competed in Formula BMW Junior in 2001, finishing ninth in the championship. He then moved to sports car racing, participating in Porsche Carrera Cup Germany, at first for his father's team, Farnbacher Racing; he also participated in the 2004 Porsche Supercup season.

In 2005, Farnbacher co-drove for Farnbacher Racing to win the GT class in the 24 Hours of Daytona. In 2006, Farnbacher drove in the Le Mans Series for Seikel Motorsport in the GT2 class. He also made his debut in the American Le Mans Series, driving at the 12 Hours of Sebring and Petit Le Mans, and participated in his first 24 Hours of Le Mans, finishing second in class. Farnbacher raced in the full ALMS season in 2007, driving a Porsche for Tafel Racing. He also ran in the Super GT series in Japan, taking two wins in the GT300 class at Motegi and Fuji. 2008 saw Farnbacher finish second in the GT2 drivers' championship for Tafel, winning four races.

In 2009, Farnbacher switched to Team PTG, driving a Panoz Esperante. He also won the Okayama 1000 Kilometers. Farnbacher won the SP7 class of the 2010 24 Hours Nürburgring with co-drivers Allan Simonsen, Leh Keen, and Marco Seefried. Farnbacher also finished second in GT2 at Le Mans with Simonsen and Keen. He spent 2011 in the ADAC GT Masters series in Germany. Late in 2012, Farnbacher began racing the SRT Viper; he ran with SRT Motorsports for the full 2013 ALMS season, and remained with the team in the merged United SportsCar Championship in 2014.

On September 14, 2011, Farnbacher lapped the 20.6-kilometre Nürburgring Nordschleife in 7:12.13 in a 2010 Dodge Viper SRT-10 ACR, setting a record for volume production cars.

== Motorsports career results ==
=== 24 Hours of Le Mans ===
24 Hours of Le Mans results
Year	Team	Co-Drivers	Car	Class	Laps	Pos.	Class Pos.
2006	(Germany) Seikel Motorsport (Germany) Farnbacher Racing	(Denmark) Lars-Erik Nielsen (Germany) Pierre Ehret	Porsche 997 GT3-RS	GT2	320	16th	2nd
2009	(Germany) Hankook Team Farnbacher	(Denmark) Allan Simonsen (San Marino) Christian Montanari	Ferrari F430 GT2	GT2	183	DNF	DNF
2010	(Germany) Hankook Team Farnbacher	(Denmark) Allan Simonsen (United States) Leh Keen	Ferrari F430 GT2	GT2	336	12th	2nd
2011	(Germany) Hankook Team Farnbacher	(Denmark) Allan Simonsen (United States) Leh Keen	Ferrari 458 Italia GTC	GTE; Pro	137	DNF	DNF
2012	(France) Luxury Racing	(France) Frédéric Makowiecki (Brazil) Jaime Melo	Ferrari 458 Italia GT2	GTE; Pro	333	18th	2nd
2013	(United States) SRT Motorsports	(United Kingdom) Ryan Dalziel (Belgium) Marc Goossens	SRT Viper GTS-R	GTE; Pro	306	24th	8th

=== 24 Hours of Daytona ===
(key)

24 Hours of Daytona results
Year	Class	No	Team	Car	Co-drivers	Laps	Position	Class Pos.
2005	GT	71	(United States) Farnbacher Racing USA	Porsche GT3 Cup	(Germany) Wolf Henzler (United States) Shawn Price (Germany) Pierre Ehret	664	10	1
2006	GT	82	(United States) Farnbacher Loles Racing	Porsche GT3 Cup	(United States) Mike Fitzgerald (Germany) Pierre Ehret (Germany) Marc Basseng	671	15	5
2007	GT	74	(United States) Tafel Racing	Porsche GT3 Cup	(United States) Eric Lux (Germany) Wolf Henzler (United States) Jim Tafel	544	39 ^{DNF}	20 ^{DNF}
2008	GT	87	(United States) Farnbacher Loles Racing	Porsche GT3 Cup	(Germany) Pierre Ehret (Germany) Timo Bernhard (Germany) Dirk Werner	646	18	8
2009	GT	86	(United States) Farnbacher Loles Racing	Porsche GT3 Cup	(United States) Eric Lux (United Kingdom) Mathew Marsh (United States) Kevin Roush	688	13	5
2010	GT	23	(United States) Alex Job Racing	Porsche GT3 Cup	(United States) Claudio Bertin (United States) Jack Baldwin (United States) Mitch Pagerey (Austria) Martin Ragginger	688	19	12
2011	GT	66	(United States) The Racer's Group	Porsche GT3 Cup	(United States) Tim George Jr. (United States) Ben Keating (Germany) Lucas Luhr	612	27 ^{DNF}	13 ^{DNF}
2012	GT	66	(United States) The Racer's Group	Porsche GT3	(United States) Ben Keating (France) Patrick Pilet (Denmark) Allan Simonsen	721	17	7
2013	GT	66	(United States) The Racer's Group	Porsche GT3	(Germany) Jörg Bergmeister (United States) Ben Keating (Canada) Kuno Wittmer	622	31	20
2014	GTLM	91	(United States) SRT Motorsports	SRT Viper GTS-R	(Belgium) Marc Goossens (United States) Ryan Hunter-Reay	675	12	3

=== IMSA WeatherTech SportsCar Championship series results ===
Year	Team	Class	Make	Engine	1	2	3	4	5	6	7	8	9	10	11	12	Rank	Points	Ref
2014	SRT Motorsports	GTLM	SRT Viper GTS-R	Dodge 8.0L V10	DAY; 3	SEB; 7	LBH; 7	LGA; 6	WGL; 2	MOS; 3	IMS; 8	ELK; 4	VIR; 6	COT; 2	PET; 6		5th	309	
2015	Riley Motorsports	GTD	Dodge Viper GT3-R	Dodge 8.3 L V10	DAY; 1	SEB	LGA	BEL	WGL	LIM	ELK	VIR	AUS	ATL			29th	36	
2016	Riley Motorsports	GTD	SRT Viper GT3-R	SRT 8.3 V10	DAY; 9	SEB	LGA	BEL	WGL	MOS	LIM	ELK	VIR	AUS	PET		49th	23	
2016	Alegra Motorsports	P	Riley Mk XXVI DP	Dinan (BMW) 5.0 L V8	DAY	SEB; 11	LBH	LGA	BEL	WGL	MSP	ELK	AUS	PET			35th	21	
2017	3GT Racing	GTD	Lexus RC F GT3	Lexus 5.0 L V8	DAY; 14	SEB	LBH	COA	BEL	WGL	MOS	LIM	ELK	VIR	LGA	PET	72nd	17	
2018	3GT Racing	GTD	Lexus RC F GT3	Lexus 5.0 L V8	DAY; 9	SEB	MOH	BEL	WGL	MOS	LIM	ELK	VIR	LGA	PET		55th	22	
2019	Scuderia Corsa	GTD	Ferrari 488 GT3	Ferrari F154CB 3.9 L Turbo V8	DAY; 23	SEB	MDO	DET	WGL	MOS	LIM	ELK	VIR	LGA	PET		70th	8	
