= 2011 Rolex Sports Car Series =

12th season of the racing series organized by Grand-Am

Seasons
- ← 2010 2012 →

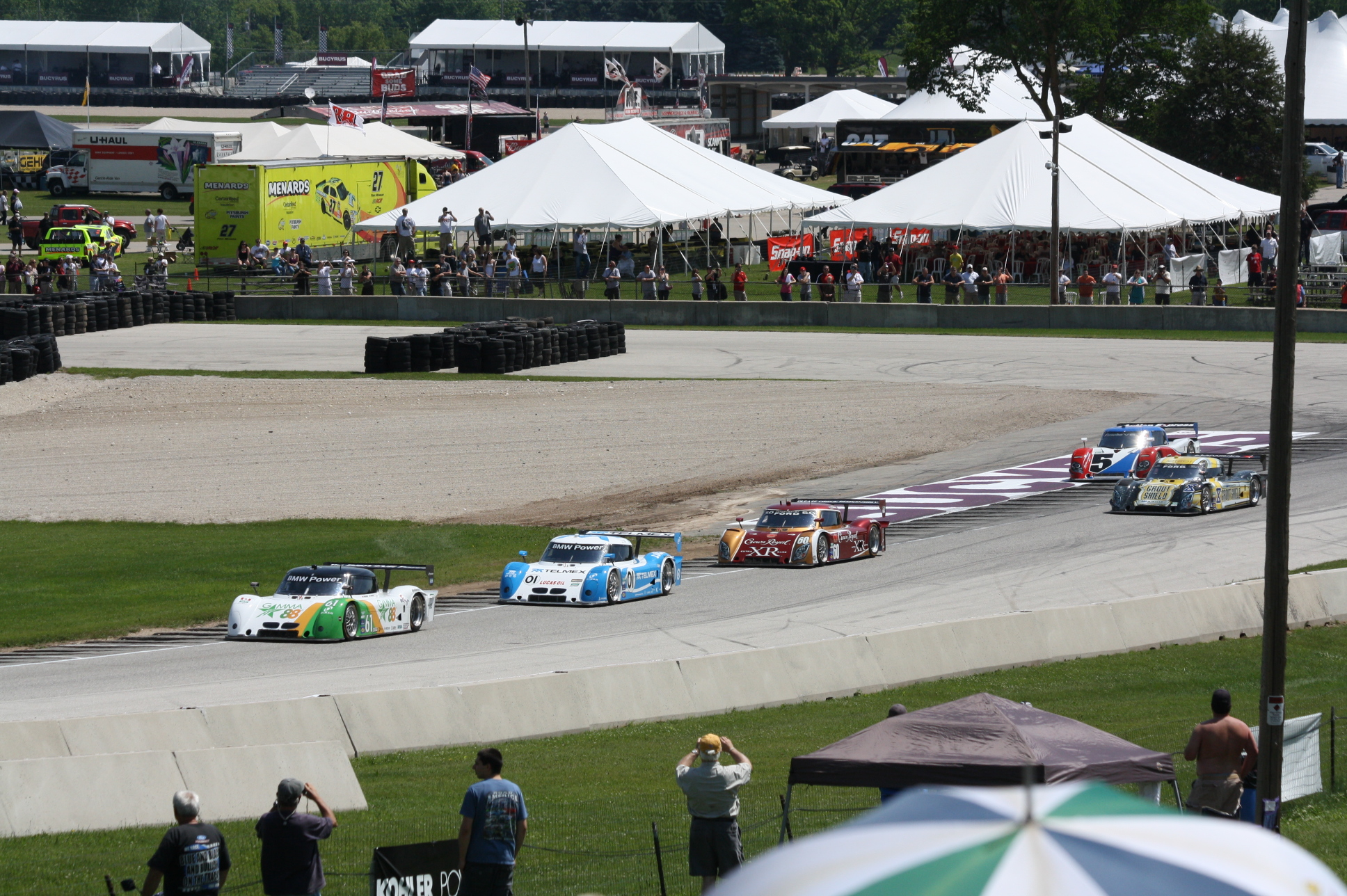
Daytona Prototype field at Road America

The 2011 Rolex Sports Car Series season was the twelfth season of Grand-Am's premier series.The season began with the Rolex 24 at Daytona on January 29 and finished with the EMCO Gears Classic at the Mid-Ohio Sports Car Course on September 17.

Continental Tire became the official tire partner and supplier for Grand-Am, replacing Pirelli after three seasons due to Pirelli's departure to FIA Formula 1 World Championship, GP2 Asia Series and GP2 Series (now FIA Formula 2 Championship) as well as increasing GP3 Series (now FIA Formula 3 Championship) involvement as an official tire partner and supplier after FIA World Motor Sport Council meeting verdict event in Geneva, Switzerland on June 24, 2010. The company purchased the naming rights of the RSCS's support series, the Grand-Am Cup Series, from KONI in 2010.

A notable change is the television coverage. In contrast to 2010, about half of the races were not televised live.

== Schedule ==
The official schedule was released October 18, 2010, and consisted of twelve rounds. Road America appears on the schedule after a nine-year absence, while Laguna Seca returns after its absence from the schedule in 2010. The second race at Daytona and Miller Motorsports Park do not return.

Rnd	Race	Length/Duration	Circuit	Location	Date
1	Rolex 24 At Daytona	24 hours	Daytona International Speedway	Daytona Beach, Florida	January 27–30
2	Grand Prix of Miami	2 hours 45 minutes	Homestead-Miami Speedway	Homestead, Florida	March 5
3	Porsche 250	2 hours 45 minutes	Barber Motorsports Park	Birmingham, Alabama	April 9
4	Bosch Engineering 250	250 miles or 3 hours	Virginia International Raceway	Danville, Virginia	May 14
5	Memorial Day Classic	2 hours 45 minutes	Lime Rock Park	Lime Rock, Connecticut	May 30
6	Sahlen's Six Hours of The Glen	6 hours	Watkins Glen International	Watkins Glen, New York	June 4
7	Rolex Sports Car Series 250	2 hours	Road America	Elkhart Lake, Wisconsin	June 25
8	Continental Tire Sports Car Festival	2 hours 45 minutes	Mazda Raceway Laguna Seca	Monterey, California	July 9
9	American Red Cross 250	2 hours 45 minutes	New Jersey Motorsports Park	Millville, New Jersey	July 24
10	Canadian Tire 200	2 hours or 200 miles	Watkins Glen short	Watkins Glen, New York	August 13
11	Montreal 200	2 hours 30 minutes or 200 miles	Circuit Gilles Villeneuve	Montreal, Quebec	August 20
12	EMCO Gears Classic	3 hours	Mid-Ohio Sports Car Course	Lexington, Ohio	September 17

== Teams and drivers ==
Team	No	Drivers	Chassis Engine	Class	Rounds
Chip Ganassi Racing with Felix Sabates	01	(United States) Scott Pruett	Riley Mk. XX; BMW 5.0L V8	DP	All
Chip Ganassi Racing with Felix Sabates	01	(Mexico) Memo Rojas	Riley Mk. XX; BMW 5.0L V8	DP	All
Chip Ganassi Racing with Felix Sabates	01	(United States) Joey Hand	Riley Mk. XX; BMW 5.0L V8	DP	1
Chip Ganassi Racing with Felix Sabates	01	(United States) Graham Rahal	Riley Mk. XX; BMW 5.0L V8	DP	1
Chip Ganassi Racing with Felix Sabates	02	(New Zealand) Scott Dixon	Riley Mk. XX; BMW 5.0L V8	DP	1
Chip Ganassi Racing with Felix Sabates	02	(United Kingdom) Dario Franchitti	Riley Mk. XX; BMW 5.0L V8	DP	1
Chip Ganassi Racing with Felix Sabates	02	(United States) Jamie McMurray	Riley Mk. XX; BMW 5.0L V8	DP	1
Chip Ganassi Racing with Felix Sabates	02	(Colombia) Juan Pablo Montoya	Riley Mk. XX; BMW 5.0L V8	DP	1
Starworks Motorsport	2	(Venezuela) Alex Popow	Riley Mk. XX; Ford 5.0L V8 8 Porsche 5.0L V8 4	DP	1–9, 11–12
Starworks Motorsport	2	(Venezuela) Enzo Potolicchio	Riley Mk. XX; Ford 5.0L V8 8 Porsche 5.0L V8 4	DP	1–7, 9–10
Starworks Motorsport	2	(United Kingdom) Ryan Dalziel	Riley Mk. XX; Ford 5.0L V8 8 Porsche 5.0L V8 4	DP	8, 11
Starworks Motorsport	2	(France) Romain Iannetta	Riley Mk. XX; Ford 5.0L V8 8 Porsche 5.0L V8 4	DP	1
Starworks Motorsport	2	(Venezuela) E. J. Viso	Riley Mk. XX; Ford 5.0L V8 8 Porsche 5.0L V8 4	DP	1
Starworks Motorsport	2	(United States) Colin Braun	Riley Mk. XX; Ford 5.0L V8 8 Porsche 5.0L V8 4	DP	6
Starworks Motorsport	2	(Canada) Mike Forest	Riley Mk. XX; Ford 5.0L V8 8 Porsche 5.0L V8 4	DP	8
Starworks Motorsport	2	(Brazil) Raphael Matos	Riley Mk. XX; Ford 5.0L V8 8 Porsche 5.0L V8 4	DP	9
Starworks Motorsport	2	(Germany) Jörg Bergmeister	Riley Mk. XX; Ford 5.0L V8 8 Porsche 5.0L V8 4	DP	10
Starworks Motorsport	2	(Canada) Mark Wilkins	Riley Mk. XX; Ford 5.0L V8 8 Porsche 5.0L V8 4	DP	12
Starworks Motorsport	7	(United States) Jared Beyer	Riley Mk. XX; Ford 5.0L V8	DP	1
Starworks Motorsport	7	(Belgium) Jan Heylen	Riley Mk. XX; Ford 5.0L V8	DP	1
Starworks Motorsport	7	(United States) Scott Mayer	Riley Mk. XX; Ford 5.0L V8	DP	1
Starworks Motorsport	7	(United States) Doug Peterson	Riley Mk. XX; Ford 5.0L V8	DP	1
Starworks Motorsport	7	(United States) R.J. Valentine	Riley Mk. XX; Ford 5.0L V8	DP	1
Starworks Motorsport	7	(United Kingdom) Ryan Dalziel	Riley Mk. XX; Ford 5.0L V8	DP	9
Starworks Motorsport	7	(Brazil) Raphael Matos	Riley Mk. XX; Ford 5.0L V8	DP	9
Starworks Motorsport	7	(Venezuela) Enzo Potolicchio	Riley Mk. XX; Ford 5.0L V8	DP	9
Starworks Motorsport	8	(United Kingdom) Ryan Dalziel	Riley Mk. XX; Ford 5.0L V8	DP	1–3, 5–8, 10–12
Starworks Motorsport	8	(Canada) Mike Forest	Riley Mk. XX; Ford 5.0L V8	DP	1–8
Starworks Motorsport	8	(United States) Colin Braun	Riley Mk. XX; Ford 5.0L V8	DP	1, 6
Starworks Motorsport	8	(Venezuela) Enzo Potolicchio	Riley Mk. XX; Ford 5.0L V8	DP	11–12
Starworks Motorsport	8	(United States) Jim Lowe	Riley Mk. XX; Ford 5.0L V8	DP	1
Starworks Motorsport	8	(Czech Republic) Tomáš Enge	Riley Mk. XX; Ford 5.0L V8	DP	1
Starworks Motorsport	8	(Venezuela) Alex Popow	Riley Mk. XX; Ford 5.0L V8	DP	10
Sports Car Driving Experience	3	(United States) Henry Gilbert	Riley Mk. XX; Chevrolet 5.0L V8	DP	2
Sports Car Driving Experience	3	(United States) Shane Lewis	Riley Mk. XX; Chevrolet 5.0L V8	DP	2
Marsh Racing	3	(United States) Joey Logano	Chevrolet Corvette C6; Chevrolet 5.7L V8	GT	10
Marsh Racing	3	(United States) Boris Said	Chevrolet Corvette C6; Chevrolet 5.7L V8	GT	10
Marsh Racing	31	(United States) Eric Curran	Chevrolet Corvette C6; Chevrolet 5.7L V8	GT	2–9, 12
Marsh Racing	31	(United States) Boris Said	Chevrolet Corvette C6; Chevrolet 5.7L V8	GT	2–6, 8–9, 11–12
Marsh Racing	31	(United States) John Heinricy	Chevrolet Corvette C6; Chevrolet 5.7L V8	GT	7
Marsh Racing	31	(Australia) Owen Kelly	Chevrolet Corvette C6; Chevrolet 5.7L V8	GT	11
The Racer's Group	4	(United States) Daniel Graeff	Porsche 997 GT3 Cup; Porsche 3.6L Flat-6	GT	1, 8
The Racer's Group	4	(United States) Ryan Eversley	Porsche 997 GT3 Cup; Porsche 3.6L Flat-6	GT	1
The Racer's Group	4	(United States) Kenny Wallace	Porsche 997 GT3 Cup; Porsche 3.6L Flat-6	GT	1
The Racer's Group	4	(United States) Ron Yarab Jr.	Porsche 997 GT3 Cup; Porsche 3.6L Flat-6	GT	1
The Racer's Group	4	(United States) Richard Zhan	Porsche 997 GT3 Cup; Porsche 3.6L Flat-6	GT	1
The Racer's Group	4	(United States) Kevin Buckler	Porsche 997 GT3 Cup; Porsche 3.6L Flat-6	GT	8
The Racer's Group	53	(United States) Joe Castellano	Porsche 997 GT3 Cup; Porsche 3.6L Flat-6	GT	1
The Racer's Group	53	(United States) Ken Dobson	Porsche 997 GT3 Cup; Porsche 3.6L Flat-6	GT	1
The Racer's Group	53	(United States) Bob Doyle	Porsche 997 GT3 Cup; Porsche 3.6L Flat-6	GT	1
The Racer's Group	53	(United States) Jim Michaelian	Porsche 997 GT3 Cup; Porsche 3.6L Flat-6	GT	1
The Racer's Group	53	(United States) Coulter Mulligan	Porsche 997 GT3 Cup; Porsche 3.6L Flat-6	GT	1
The Racer's Group	54	(Netherlands) Jeroen Bleekemolen	Porsche 997 GT3 Cup; Porsche 3.6L Flat-6	GT	1
The Racer's Group	54	(United States) Bret Curtis	Porsche 997 GT3 Cup; Porsche 3.6L Flat-6	GT	1
The Racer's Group	54	(United States) Tim Pappas	Porsche 997 GT3 Cup; Porsche 3.6L Flat-6	GT	1
The Racer's Group	54	(France) Patrick Pilet	Porsche 997 GT3 Cup; Porsche 3.6L Flat-6	GT	1
The Racer's Group	54	(United States) James Sofronas	Porsche 997 GT3 Cup; Porsche 3.6L Flat-6	GT	1
The Racer's Group	66	(Germany) Dominik Farnbacher	Porsche 997 GT3 Cup; Porsche 3.6L Flat-6	GT	1
The Racer's Group	66	(United States) Tim George Jr.	Porsche 997 GT3 Cup; Porsche 3.6L Flat-6	GT	1
The Racer's Group	66	(United States) Ben Keating	Porsche 997 GT3 Cup; Porsche 3.6L Flat-6	GT	1
The Racer's Group	66	(Germany) Lucas Luhr	Porsche 997 GT3 Cup; Porsche 3.6L Flat-6	GT	1
The Racer's Group	66	(United States) Duncan Ende	Porsche 997 GT3 Cup; Porsche 3.6L Flat-6	GT	10
The Racer's Group	66	(United States) Andy Lally	Porsche 997 GT3 Cup; Porsche 3.6L Flat-6	GT	10
The Racer's Group	67	(United States) Steven Bertheau	Porsche 997 GT3 Cup; Porsche 3.6L Flat-6	GT	1–4, 6–8, 10
The Racer's Group	67	(United States) Spencer Pumpelly	Porsche 997 GT3 Cup; Porsche 3.6L Flat-6	GT	1–4, 6–7, 10
The Racer's Group	67	(United States) Ryan Eversley	Porsche 997 GT3 Cup; Porsche 3.6L Flat-6	GT	6, 8
The Racer's Group	67	(United States) Brendan Gaughan	Porsche 997 GT3 Cup; Porsche 3.6L Flat-6	GT	1
The Racer's Group	67	(Germany) Wolf Henzler	Porsche 997 GT3 Cup; Porsche 3.6L Flat-6	GT	1
The Racer's Group	67	(United States) Andy Lally	Porsche 997 GT3 Cup; Porsche 3.6L Flat-6	GT	1
Action Express Racing	5	(United States) David Donohue	Riley Mk. XX; Porsche 5.0L V8	DP	All
Action Express Racing	5	(United States) Darren Law	Riley Mk. XX; Porsche 5.0L V8	DP	All
Action Express Racing	5	(United States) Burt Frisselle	Riley Mk. XX; Porsche 5.0L V8	DP	1, 6
Action Express Racing	5	(United States) Buddy Rice	Riley Mk. XX; Porsche 5.0L V8	DP	1
Action Express Racing	9	(Portugal) João Barbosa	Riley Mk. XX; Porsche 5.0L V8	DP	All
Action Express Racing	9	(United States) J.C. France	Riley Mk. XX; Porsche 5.0L V8	DP	All
Action Express Racing	9	(United States) Terry Borcheller	Riley Mk. XX; Porsche 5.0L V8	DP	1–10, 12
Action Express Racing	9	(Brazil) Christian Fittipaldi	Riley Mk. XX; Porsche 5.0L V8	DP	1
Action Express Racing	9	(Italy) Max Papis	Riley Mk. XX; Porsche 5.0L V8	DP	1
Michael Shank Racing with Curb/Agajanian	6	(United States) A. J. Allmendinger	Riley Mk. XX; Porsche 5.0L V8	DP	1
Michael Shank Racing with Curb/Agajanian	6	(United States) Michael McDowell	Riley Mk. XX; Porsche 5.0L V8	DP	1
Michael Shank Racing with Curb/Agajanian	6	(United Kingdom) Justin Wilson	Riley Mk. XX; Porsche 5.0L V8	DP	1
Michael Shank Racing	23	(United Kingdom) Mark Blundell	Riley Mk. XX; Ford 5.0L V8	DP	1–2, 10, 12
Michael Shank Racing	23	(United States) Zak Brown	Riley Mk. XX; Ford 5.0L V8	DP	1, 10, 12
Michael Shank Racing	23	(United Kingdom) Mark Patterson	Riley Mk. XX; Ford 5.0L V8	DP	1
Michael Shank Racing	23	(Canada) Michael Valiante	Riley Mk. XX; Ford 5.0L V8	DP	2
Michael Shank Racing	23	(United States) Matt Bell	Riley Mk. XX; Ford 5.0L V8	DP	8
Michael Shank Racing	23	(United States) James Davison	Riley Mk. XX; Ford 5.0L V8	DP	8
Michael Shank Racing	60	(Brazil) Oswaldo Negri Jr.	Riley Mk. XX; Porsche 5.0L V8	DP	All
Michael Shank Racing	60	(United States) John Pew	Riley Mk. XX; Porsche 5.0L V8	DP	All
Michael Shank Racing	60	(Belgium) Marc Goossens	Riley Mk. XX; Porsche 5.0L V8	DP	1
Michael Shank Racing	60	(Canada) Michael Valiante	Riley Mk. XX; Porsche 5.0L V8	DP	1
Banner Racing	07	(Canada) Gunter Schaldach	Chevrolet Camaro GT.R; Chevrolet 6.0L V8	GT	All
Banner Racing	07	(United Kingdom) Oliver Gavin	Chevrolet Camaro GT.R; Chevrolet 6.0L V8	GT	1–8, 10
Banner Racing	07	(United States) Mike Skeen	Chevrolet Camaro GT.R; Chevrolet 6.0L V8	GT	6, 8–9, 11
Banner Racing	07	(United States) Eric Curran	Chevrolet Camaro GT.R; Chevrolet 6.0L V8	GT	1
Banner Racing	07	(United States) Bruce Ledoux	Chevrolet Camaro GT.R; Chevrolet 6.0L V8	GT	1
Banner Racing	07	(United States) Daniel Herrington	Chevrolet Camaro GT.R; Chevrolet 6.0L V8	GT	12
SunTrust Racing	10	(Italy) Max Angelelli	Dallara Corvette DP; Chevrolet 5.5L V8	DP	All
SunTrust Racing	10	(United States) Ricky Taylor	Dallara Corvette DP; Chevrolet 5.5L V8	DP	All
SunTrust Racing	10	(Australia) Ryan Briscoe	Dallara Corvette DP; Chevrolet 5.5L V8	DP	1
SunTrust Racing	10	(South Africa) Wayne Taylor	Dallara Corvette DP; Chevrolet 5.5L V8	DP	1
TPN Racing / Blackforest	11	(United States) Tom Nastasi	Ford Mustang Boss 302; Ford 5.0L V8	GT	1–2, 6
TPN Racing / Blackforest	11	(Canada) Scott Maxwell	Ford Mustang Boss 302; Ford 5.0L V8	GT	1, 6
TPN Racing / Blackforest	11	(United Kingdom) Ian James	Ford Mustang Boss 302; Ford 5.0L V8	GT	2, 6
TPN Racing / Blackforest	11	(United States) David Russell	Ford Mustang Boss 302; Ford 5.0L V8	GT	1
TPN Racing / Blackforest	11	(Canada) Dave Empringham	Ford Mustang Boss 302; Ford 5.0L V8	GT	1
TPN Racing / Blackforest	11	(United States) David Ragan	Ford Mustang Boss 302; Ford 5.0L V8	GT	10
TPN Racing / Blackforest	11	(United States) Ricky Stenhouse Jr.	Ford Mustang Boss 302; Ford 5.0L V8	GT	10
Burtin Racing	17	(France) Nicolas Armindo	Porsche 997 GT3 Cup; Porsche 3.6L Flat-6	GT	1
Burtin Racing	17	(United States) Jack Baldwin	Porsche 997 GT3 Cup; Porsche 3.6L Flat-6	GT	1
Burtin Racing	17	(Argentina) Claudio Burtin	Porsche 997 GT3 Cup; Porsche 3.6L Flat-6	GT	1
Burtin Racing	17	(Austria) Martin Ragginger	Porsche 997 GT3 Cup; Porsche 3.6L Flat-6	GT	1
Burtin Racing	17	(United Kingdom) Nick Tandy	Porsche 997 GT3 Cup; Porsche 3.6L Flat-6	GT	1
Mühlner Motorsports America	18	(United States) Corey Friedman	Porsche 997 GT3 Cup; Porsche 3.6L Flat-6	GT	1
Mühlner Motorsports America	18	(United States) Peter Ludwig	Porsche 997 GT3 Cup; Porsche 3.6L Flat-6	GT	1
Mühlner Motorsports America	18	(South Africa) Dion von Moltke	Porsche 997 GT3 Cup; Porsche 3.6L Flat-6	GT	1
Mühlner Motorsports America	18	(Canada) Mark Thomas	Porsche 997 GT3 Cup; Porsche 3.6L Flat-6	GT	1
Bullet Racing	22	(United States) Eric Lux	Porsche 997 GT3 Cup; Porsche 3.6L Flat-6	GT	1
Bullet Racing	22	(Hong Kong) Darryl O'Young	Porsche 997 GT3 Cup; Porsche 3.6L Flat-6	GT	1
Bullet Racing	22	(United Kingdom) James Walker	Porsche 997 GT3 Cup; Porsche 3.6L Flat-6	GT	1
Bullet Racing	22	(United States) Brian Wong	Porsche 997 GT3 Cup; Porsche 3.6L Flat-6	GT	1
Racers Edge Motorsports	30	(United States) Joao Mauro	Mazda RX-8; Mazda 2.0L 3-Rotor	GT	10–12
Racers Edge Motorsports	30	(United States) Michael Marsal	Mazda RX-8; Mazda 2.0L 3-Rotor	GT	1, 6
Racers Edge Motorsports	30	(Brazil) Marco Cozzi	Mazda RX-8; Mazda 2.0L 3-Rotor	GT	3, 7
Racers Edge Motorsports	30	(United States) Eric Lux	Mazda RX-8; Mazda 2.0L 3-Rotor	GT	3, 6
Racers Edge Motorsports	30	(United States) Tom Long	Mazda RX-8; Mazda 2.0L 3-Rotor	GT	10–11
Racers Edge Motorsports	30	(United States) Jade Buford	Mazda RX-8; Mazda 2.0L 3-Rotor	GT	1
Racers Edge Motorsports	30	(United States) Gary Jensen	Mazda RX-8; Mazda 2.0L 3-Rotor	GT	1
Racers Edge Motorsports	30	(United States) Mark Jensen	Mazda RX-8; Mazda 2.0L 3-Rotor	GT	1
Racers Edge Motorsports	30	(United States) Scott Rettich	Mazda RX-8; Mazda 2.0L 3-Rotor	GT	1
Racers Edge Motorsports	30	(Belgium) Jan Heylen	Mazda RX-8; Mazda 2.0L 3-Rotor	GT	2
Racers Edge Motorsports	30	(United States) Ross Smith	Mazda RX-8; Mazda 2.0L 3-Rotor	GT	2
Racers Edge Motorsports	30	(United States) Daniel Herrington	Mazda RX-8; Mazda 2.0L 3-Rotor	GT	4
Racers Edge Motorsports	30	(United States) Brett Sandberg	Mazda RX-8; Mazda 2.0L 3-Rotor	GT	4
Racers Edge Motorsports	30	(United States) Ari Straus	Mazda RX-8; Mazda 2.0L 3-Rotor	GT	6
PR1 Motorsports	32	(United States) David Cheng	BMW M6; BMW 5.0L V8	GT	1
PR1 Motorsports	32	(United States) Max Hyatt	BMW M6; BMW 5.0L V8	GT	1
PR1 Motorsports	32	(United Kingdom) Ryan Lewis	BMW M6; BMW 5.0L V8	GT	1
PR1 Motorsports	32	(United States) Tom Papadopoulos	BMW M6; BMW 5.0L V8	GT	1
Yellow Dragon Motorsports	36	(Canada) Chris Cumming	Mazda RX-8; Mazda 2.0L 3-Rotor	GT	1
Yellow Dragon Motorsports	36	(Canada) Taylor Hacquard	Mazda RX-8; Mazda 2.0L 3-Rotor	GT	1
Yellow Dragon Motorsports	36	(United States) Justin Marks	Mazda RX-8; Mazda 2.0L 3-Rotor	GT	1
Yellow Dragon Motorsports	36	(United States) Mikel Miller	Mazda RX-8; Mazda 2.0L 3-Rotor	GT	1
Dempsey Racing	40	(Canada) Joe Foster	Mazda RX-8; Mazda 2.0L 3-Rotor	GT	All
Dempsey Racing	40	(United States) Patrick Dempsey	Mazda RX-8; Mazda 2.0L 3-Rotor	GT	1–6, 8–12
Dempsey Racing	40	(United States) Charles Espenlaub	Mazda RX-8; Mazda 2.0L 3-Rotor	GT	1, 6–8
Dempsey Racing	40	(United States) Tom Long	Mazda RX-8; Mazda 2.0L 3-Rotor	GT	1
Dempsey Racing	41	(United States) Dane Cameron	Mazda RX-8; Mazda 2.0L 3-Rotor	GT	All
Dempsey Racing	41	(United States) James Gue	Mazda RX-8; Mazda 2.0L 3-Rotor	GT	All
Dempsey Racing	41	(United Kingdom) Ian James	Mazda RX-8; Mazda 2.0L 3-Rotor	GT	1
Dempsey Racing	41	(United States) Don Kitch Jr.	Mazda RX-8; Mazda 2.0L 3-Rotor	GT	1
Dempsey Racing	41	(Canada) Dave Lacey	Mazda RX-8; Mazda 2.0L 3-Rotor	GT	1
Team Sahlen	42	(United States) Wayne Nonnamaker	Mazda RX-8; Mazda 2.0L 3-Rotor	GT	All
Team Sahlen	42	(Mexico) Memo Gidley	Mazda RX-8; Mazda 2.0L 3-Rotor	GT	1–6
Team Sahlen	42	(United States) John Edwards	Mazda RX-8; Mazda 2.0L 3-Rotor	GT	7–12
Team Sahlen	42	(United States) Joe Nonnamaker	Mazda RX-8; Mazda 2.0L 3-Rotor	GT	1
Team Sahlen	42	(United States) Will Nonnamaker	Mazda RX-8; Mazda 2.0L 3-Rotor	GT	1
Team Sahlen	42	(United States) Joe Sahlen	Mazda RX-8; Mazda 2.0L 3-Rotor	GT	1
Team Sahlen	43	(United States) Joe Nonnamaker	Mazda RX-8; Mazda 2.0L 3-Rotor	GT	1–9, 11–12
Team Sahlen	43	(United States) Will Nonnamaker	Mazda RX-8; Mazda 2.0L 3-Rotor	GT	1, 3–5, 7, 9–12
Team Sahlen	43	(United States) Wayne Nonnamaker	Mazda RX-8; Mazda 2.0L 3-Rotor	GT	1–5, 8, 11–12
Team Sahlen	43	(United States) Joe Sahlen	Mazda RX-8; Mazda 2.0L 3-Rotor	GT	1, 6, 10
Team Sahlen	43	(Mexico) Memo Gidley	Mazda RX-8; Mazda 2.0L 3-Rotor	GT	1
Team Sahlen	49	(United States) Will Nonnamaker	Mazda RX-8; Mazda 2.0L 3-Rotor	GT	2–4, 6–8, 12
Team Sahlen	49	(United States) Joe Sahlen	Mazda RX-8; Mazda 2.0L 3-Rotor	GT	2–3, 6, 8, 12
Team Sahlen	49	(United States) Joe Nonnamaker	Mazda RX-8; Mazda 2.0L 3-Rotor	GT	7, 10, 12
Team Sahlen	49	(United States) Wayne Nonnamaker	Mazda RX-8; Mazda 2.0L 3-Rotor	GT	3, 10
Magnus Racing	44	(United States) John Potter	Porsche 997 GT3 Cup; Porsche 3.6L Flat-6	GT	All
Magnus Racing	44	(United States) Craig Stanton	Porsche 997 GT3 Cup; Porsche 3.6L Flat-6	GT	All
Magnus Racing	44	(Austria) Richard Lietz	Porsche 997 GT3 Cup; Porsche 3.6L Flat-6	GT	1
Magnus Racing	44	(Austria) Marco Holzer	Porsche 997 GT3 Cup; Porsche 3.6L Flat-6	GT	1
Magnus Racing	44	(United States) Bryan Sellers	Porsche 997 GT3 Cup; Porsche 3.6L Flat-6	GT	6
Flying Lizard Motorsports	45	(Germany) Jörg Bergmeister	Riley Mk. XX; Porsche 5.0L V8	DP	1
Flying Lizard Motorsports	45	(United States) Patrick Long	Riley Mk. XX; Porsche 5.0L V8	DP	1
Flying Lizard Motorsports	45	(United States) Seth Neiman	Riley Mk. XX; Porsche 5.0L V8	DP	1
Flying Lizard Motorsports	45	(United States) Johannes van Overbeek	Riley Mk. XX; Porsche 5.0L V8	DP	1
Rick Ware Racing	47	(United States) Jeffrey Earnhardt	Porsche 997 GT3 Cup; Porsche 3.6L Flat-6	GT	1
Rick Ware Racing	47	(United States) Doug Harrington	Porsche 997 GT3 Cup; Porsche 3.6L Flat-6	GT	1
Rick Ware Racing	47	(United States) Maurice Hull	Porsche 997 GT3 Cup; Porsche 3.6L Flat-6	GT	1
Rick Ware Racing	47	(United States) Scott Monroe	Porsche 997 GT3 Cup; Porsche 3.6L Flat-6	GT	1
Rick Ware Racing	47	(United States) Brett Sandberg	Porsche 997 GT3 Cup; Porsche 3.6L Flat-6	GT	1
Paul Miller Racing	48	(United Kingdom) Robert Bell	Porsche 997 GT3 Cup; Porsche 3.6L Flat-6	GT	1
Paul Miller Racing	48	(United States) Bryce Miller	Porsche 997 GT3 Cup; Porsche 3.6L Flat-6	GT	1
Paul Miller Racing	48	(United States) Bryan Sellers	Porsche 997 GT3 Cup; Porsche 3.6L Flat-6	GT	1
Paul Miller Racing	48	(United Kingdom) Tim Sugden	Porsche 997 GT3 Cup; Porsche 3.6L Flat-6	GT	1
Level 5 Motorsports	55	(France) Christophe Bouchut	Riley Mk. XX; BMW 5.0L V8	DP	1
Level 5 Motorsports	55	(Mexico) Luis Díaz	Riley Mk. XX; BMW 5.0L V8	DP	1
Level 5 Motorsports	55	(United States) Scott Tucker	Riley Mk. XX; BMW 5.0L V8	DP	1
Level 5 Motorsports	55	(Canada) Mark Wilkins	Riley Mk. XX; BMW 5.0L V8	DP	1
Level 5 Motorsports	95	(United States) Ryan Hunter-Reay	Riley Mk. XX; BMW 5.0L V8	DP	1
Level 5 Motorsports	95	(Brazil) Raphael Matos	Riley Mk. XX; BMW 5.0L V8	DP	1
Level 5 Motorsports	95	(United States) Scott Tucker	Riley Mk. XX; BMW 5.0L V8	DP	1
Level 5 Motorsports	95	(United Kingdom) Richard Westbrook	Riley Mk. XX; BMW 5.0L V8	DP	1
Bennett Racing	56	(United States) Jonathan Allen	Ferrari F430 Challenge; Ferrari 4.3L V8	GT	1
Bennett Racing	56	(United States) Michael Davidson	Ferrari F430 Challenge; Ferrari 4.3L V8	GT	1
Bennett Racing	56	(Canada) Jean-François Dumoulin	Ferrari F430 Challenge; Ferrari 4.3L V8	GT	1
Bennett Racing	56	(United Kingdom) Glynn Geddie	Ferrari F430 Challenge; Ferrari 4.3L V8	GT	1
Bennett Racing	56	(United States) Mike Skeen	Ferrari F430 Challenge; Ferrari 4.3L V8	GT	
Stevenson Motorsports	57	(Denmark) Ronnie Bremer	Chevrolet Camaro GT.R; Chevrolet 6.0L V8	GT	1
Stevenson Motorsports	57	(United Kingdom) Robin Liddell	Chevrolet Camaro GT.R; Chevrolet 6.0L V8	GT	1
Stevenson Motorsports	57	(Denmark) Jan Magnussen	Chevrolet Camaro GT.R; Chevrolet 6.0L V8	GT	1
Brumos Racing	59	(United States) Andrew Davis	Porsche 997 GT3 Cup; Porsche 3.6L Flat-6	GT	All
Brumos Racing	59	(United States) Leh Keen	Porsche 997 GT3 Cup; Porsche 3.6L Flat-6	GT	All
Brumos Racing	59	(United States) Hurley Haywood	Porsche 997 GT3 Cup; Porsche 3.6L Flat-6	GT	1
Brumos Racing	59	(Germany) Marc Lieb	Porsche 997 GT3 Cup; Porsche 3.6L Flat-6	GT	1
AIM Autosport	61	(United States) Burt Frisselle	Riley Mk. XX; BMW 5.0L V8	DP	2–4, 7, 10–11
AIM Autosport	61	(Canada) Mark Wilkins	Riley Mk. XX; BMW 5.0L V8	DP	2–4, 7, 10–11
Team Spencer Motorsports	63	(United States) Richard Grupp	Mazda RX-8; Mazda 2.0L 3-Rotor	GT	1–2
Team Spencer Motorsports	63	(United States) Owen Trinkler	Mazda RX-8; Mazda 2.0L 3-Rotor	GT	1–2
Team Spencer Motorsports	63	(United States) Jim Downing	Mazda RX-8; Mazda 2.0L 3-Rotor	GT	1
Team Spencer Motorsports	63	(United States) David Murry	Mazda RX-8; Mazda 2.0L 3-Rotor	GT	1
Chris Smith Racing	65	(United States) Shane Lewis	Porsche 997 GT3 Cup; Porsche 3.6L Flat-6	GT	1
Chris Smith Racing	65	(United States) Mitch Pagerey	Porsche 997 GT3 Cup; Porsche 3.6L Flat-6	GT	1
Chris Smith Racing	65	(United States) Tom Sheehan	Porsche 997 GT3 Cup; Porsche 3.6L Flat-6	GT	1
Chris Smith Racing	65	(United States) Bill Sweedler	Porsche 997 GT3 Cup; Porsche 3.6L Flat-6	GT	1
SpeedSource	69	(United States) Emil Assentato	Mazda RX-8; Mazda 2.0L 3-Rotor	GT	All
SpeedSource	69	(United States) Jeff Segal	Mazda RX-8; Mazda 2.0L 3-Rotor	GT	All
SpeedSource	69	(United States) Nick Ham	Mazda RX-8; Mazda 2.0L 3-Rotor	GT	1
SpeedSource	69	(United States) Anthony Lazzaro	Mazda RX-8; Mazda 2.0L 3-Rotor	GT	1
SpeedSource	69	(United States) Nick Longhi	Mazda RX-8; Mazda 2.0L 3-Rotor	GT	1
SpeedSource	69	(United States) Guy Cosmo	Mazda RX-8; Mazda 2.0L 3-Rotor	GT	6
SpeedSource	70	(United States) Jonathan Bomarito	Mazda RX-8; Mazda 2.0L 3-Rotor	GT	All
SpeedSource	70	(Canada) Sylvain Tremblay	Mazda RX-8; Mazda 2.0L 3-Rotor	GT	All
SpeedSource	70	(United States) John Edwards	Mazda RX-8; Mazda 2.0L 3-Rotor	GT	1, 6
SpeedSource	70	(United Kingdom) Adam Christodoulou	Mazda RX-8; Mazda 2.0L 3-Rotor	GT	1
Grant Racing	72	(United States) Carey Grant	Porsche 997 GT3 Cup; Porsche 3.8L Flat-6	GT	2, 12
Grant Racing	72	(United States) Kevin Grant	Porsche 997 GT3 Cup; Porsche 3.8L Flat-6	GT	2, 12
Grant Racing	72	(United States) Milton Grant	Porsche 997 GT3 Cup; Porsche 3.8L Flat-6	GT	2, 12
Horton Autosport	73	(United States) Eric Foss	Porsche 997 GT3 Cup; Porsche 3.6L Flat-6	GT	10
Horton Autosport	73	(United States) Patrick Lindsey	Porsche 997 GT3 Cup; Porsche 3.6L Flat-6	GT	10
Krohn Racing	76	(Sweden) Niclas Jönsson	Lola B08/70; Ford 5.0L V8	DP	1
Krohn Racing	76	(United States) Tracy Krohn	Lola B08/70; Ford 5.0L V8	DP	1
Krohn Racing	76	(France) Nicolas Minassian	Lola B08/70; Ford 5.0L V8	DP	1
Krohn Racing	76	(Brazil) Ricardo Zonta	Lola B08/70; Ford 5.0L V8	DP	1
Doran Racing	77	(United States) Brian Frisselle	Dallara; Ford 5.0L V8	DP	All
Doran Racing	77	(United States) Henri Richard	Dallara; Ford 5.0L V8	DP	1–11
Doran Racing	77	(United States) Matt Bell	Dallara; Ford 5.0L V8	DP	1, 6
Doran Racing	77	(United Kingdom) Ross Kaiser	Dallara; Ford 5.0L V8	DP	1
Doran Racing	77	(United States) Burt Frisselle	Dallara; Ford 5.0L V8	DP	12
DragonSpeed	81	(United States) Doug Baron	Ferrari F430 Challenge; Ferrari 4.3L V8	GT	1
DragonSpeed	81	(United States) Nick Jones	Ferrari F430 Challenge; Ferrari 4.3L V8	GT	1
DragonSpeed	81	(United States) Fred Poordad	Ferrari F430 Challenge; Ferrari 4.3L V8	GT	1
DragonSpeed	81	(United States) Cort Wagner	Ferrari F430 Challenge; Ferrari 4.3L V8	GT	1
Mitchum Motorsports	86	(United States) Joey Atterbury	Porsche 997 GT3 Cup; Porsche 3.8L Flat-6	GT	All
Mitchum Motorsports	86	(United States) Cooper MacNeil	Porsche 997 GT3 Cup; Porsche 3.8L Flat-6	GT	All
Mitchum Motorsports	86	(United States) Randy Pobst	Porsche 997 GT3 Cup; Porsche 3.8L Flat-6	GT	
Mitchum Motorsports	86	(United States) Derek Whitis	Porsche 997 GT3 Cup; Porsche 3.8L Flat-6	GT	
Autohaus Motorsports	88	(United States) Bill Lester	Chevrolet Camaro GT.R; Chevrolet 6.0L V8	GT	All
Autohaus Motorsports	88	(United States) Jordan Taylor	Chevrolet Camaro GT.R; Chevrolet 6.0L V8	GT	All
Autohaus Motorsports	88	(United Kingdom) Matthew Marsh	Chevrolet Camaro GT.R; Chevrolet 6.0L V8	GT	1
Autohaus Motorsports	88	(United States) Johnny O'Connell	Chevrolet Camaro GT.R; Chevrolet 6.0L V8	GT	1
Autohaus Motorsports	88	(United States) Tommy Milner	Chevrolet Camaro GT.R; Chevrolet 6.0L V8	GT	6
Spirit of Daytona Racing	90	(United States) Paul Edwards	Coyote; Chevrolet 5.0L V8	DP	All
Spirit of Daytona Racing	90	(Spain) Antonio García	Coyote; Chevrolet 5.0L V8	DP	All
Spirit of Daytona Racing	90	(Germany) Sascha Maassen	Coyote; Chevrolet 5.0L V8	DP	1
Turner Motorsport	93	(United States) Michael Marsal	BMW M3; BMW 5.0L V8	GT	9–10, 12
Turner Motorsport	93	(United States) Peter Bassett	BMW M3; BMW 5.0L V8	GT	9
Turner Motorsport	93	(Mexico) Memo Gidley	BMW M3; BMW 5.0L V8	GT	9
Turner Motorsport	93	(United States) Joey Hand	BMW M3; BMW 5.0L V8	GT	10
Turner Motorsport	93	(United States) Will Turner	BMW M3; BMW 5.0L V8	GT	12
Turner Motorsport	94	(Canada) Paul Dalla Lana	BMW M3; BMW 5.0L V8	GT	All
Turner Motorsport	94	(United States) Bill Auberlen	BMW M3; BMW 5.0L V8	GT	1–7, 10
Turner Motorsport	94	(United States) Joey Hand	BMW M3; BMW 5.0L V8	GT	4, 6–7
Turner Motorsport	94	(United States) Billy Johnson	BMW M3; BMW 5.0L V8	GT	9, 11–12
Turner Motorsport	94	(United States) Matt Plumb	BMW M3; BMW 5.0L V8	GT	1
Turner Motorsport	94	(United States) Boris Said	BMW M3; BMW 5.0L V8	GT	1
Turner Motorsport	94	(Brazil) Raphael Matos	BMW M3; BMW 5.0L V8	GT	8
Turner Motorsport	94	(United States) Lawson Aschenbach	BMW M3; BMW 5.0L V8	GT	9
Alliance Autosport	97	(United States) Scott Rettich	Porsche 997 GT3 Cup; Porsche 3.6L Flat-6	GT	10, 12
Alliance Autosport	97	(United States) Mark Jensen	Porsche 997 GT3 Cup; Porsche 3.6L Flat-6	GT	10
Alliance Autosport	97	(United States) Matt Schneider	Porsche 997 GT3 Cup; Porsche 3.6L Flat-6	GT	12
GAINSCO/Bob Stallings Racing	99	(United States) Jon Fogarty	Riley Mk. XX; Chevrolet 5.0L V8	DP	All
GAINSCO/Bob Stallings Racing	99	(United States) Alex Gurney	Riley Mk. XX; Chevrolet 5.0L V8	DP	All
GAINSCO/Bob Stallings Racing	99	(United States) Jimmie Johnson	Riley Mk. XX; Chevrolet 5.0L V8	DP	1

=== Changes ===
Will Turner announced that he will field two BMW M3s in the Rolex Sports Car Series for 2011.

Memo Gidley joined Team Sahlen for the 2011 season.

Spirit of Daytona Racing announced on October 11, 2010, that they would be changing to a Chevrolet-powered prototype. SunTrust Racing also announced on October 6 that they would return to the Chevrolet powerplant after two years of using a Ford powerplant.

It was announced on October 13, 2010 that Brumos Racing would be fielding a Porsche 911 GT3 for 2011 in a return to the team's roots.The drivers will be Leh Keen and Andrew Davis.

It was announced on October 13, 2010 that Blackforest Motorsports would be returning to the series, fielding a Ford Mustang.

It was announced on October 27, 2010 that Toro Corse would be entering two Lamborghini Gallardos in the GT class. However, this never came to fruition.

== Results ==
Rnd	Circuit	Pole position	Fastest lap	Winner
1	Daytona (report)	#45 Flying Lizard Motorsports	#45 Flying Lizard Motorsports	#01 Chip Ganassi Racing with Felix Sabates
1	Daytona (report)	(Germany) Jörg Bergmeister (United States) Patrick Long (United States) Seth Neiman (United States) Johannes van Overbeek	(Germany) Jörg Bergmeister (United States) Patrick Long (United States) Seth Neiman (United States) Johannes van Overbeek	(United States) Scott Pruett (Mexico) Memo Rojas (United States) Joey Hand (United States) Graham Rahal
1	Daytona (report)	#66 The Racer's Group	#44 Magnus Racing	#67 The Racer's Group
1	Daytona (report)	(Germany) Dominik Farnbacher (United States) Tim George, Jr. (United States) Ben Keating (Germany) Lucas Luhr	(Germany) Marco Holzer (Austria) Richard Lietz (United States) John Potter (United States) Craig Stanton	(United States) Andy Lally (United States) Steven Bertheau (United States) Brendan Gaughan (Germany) Wolf Henzler (United States) Spencer Pumpelly
2	Homestead	#99 GAINSCO/Bob Stallings Racing	#9 Action Express Racing	#01 Chip Ganassi Racing with Felix Sabates
2	Homestead	(United States) Jon Fogarty (United States) Alex Gurney	(Portugal) João Barbosa (United States) Terry Borcheller	(United States) Scott Pruett (Mexico) Memo Rojas
2	Homestead	#57 Stevenson Motorsport	#57 Stevenson Motorsport	#94 Turner Motorsport
2	Homestead	(Denmark) Jan Magnussen (United Kingdom) Robin Liddell	(Denmark) Jan Magnussen (United Kingdom) Robin Liddell	(United States) Bill Auberlen (Canada) Paul Dalla Lana
3	Barber	#90 Spirit of Daytona Racing	#10 SunTrust Racing	#01 Chip Ganassi Racing with Felix Sabates
3	Barber	(Spain) Antonio García (United States) Paul Edwards	(Italy) Max Angelelli (United States) Ricky Taylor	(United States) Scott Pruett (Mexico) Memo Rojas
3	Barber	#41 Dempsey Racing	#94 Turner Motorsport	#94 Turner Motorsport
3	Barber	(United States) Dane Cameron (United States) James Gue	(United States) Bill Auberlen (Canada) Paul Dalla Lana	(United States) Bill Auberlen (Canada) Paul Dalla Lana
4	VIR	#90 Spirit of Daytona Racing	#9 Action Express Racing	#9 Action Express Racing
4	VIR	(United States) Paul Edwards (Spain) Antonio García	(Portugal) João Barbosa (United States) Terry Borcheller (United States) J. C. France	(Portugal) João Barbosa (United States) Terry Borcheller (United States) J. C. France
4	VIR	#57 Stevenson Motorsport	#88 Autohaus Motorsports	#88 Autohaus Motorsports
4	VIR	(Denmark) Jan Magnussen (United Kingdom) Robin Liddell	(United States) Jordan Taylor (United States) Bill Lester	(United States) Jordan Taylor (United States) Bill Lester
5	Lime Rock	#10 SunTrust Racing	#01 Chip Ganassi Racing with Felix Sabates	#10 SunTrust Racing
5	Lime Rock	(United States) Ricky Taylor (Italy) Max Angelelli	(United States) Scott Pruett (Mexico) Memo Rojas	(Italy) Max Angelelli (United States) Ricky Taylor
5	Lime Rock	#57 Stevenson Motorsport	#57 Stevenson Motorsport	#57 Stevenson Motorsport
5	Lime Rock	(United Kingdom) Robin Liddell (Denmark) Jan Magnussen	(Denmark) Jan Magnussen (United Kingdom) Robin Liddell	(United Kingdom) Robin Liddell (Denmark) Jan Magnussen
6	Watkins Glen Long	#10 SunTrust Racing	#10 SunTrust Racing	#10 SunTrust Racing
6	Watkins Glen Long	(United States) Ricky Taylor (Italy) Max Angelelli	(United States) Ricky Taylor (Italy) Max Angelelli	(Italy) Max Angelelli (United States) Ricky Taylor
6	Watkins Glen Long	#88 Autohaus Motorsports	#07 Banner Racing	#59 Brumos Racing
6	Watkins Glen Long	(United States) Jordan Taylor (United States) Bill Lester (United States) Tommy Milner	(United Kingdom) Oliver Gavin (United States) Gunter Schaldach (United States) Mike Skeen	(United States) Andrew Davis (United States) Leh Keen
7	Road America	#10 SunTrust Racing	#01 Chip Ganassi Racing with Felix Sabates	#01 Chip Ganassi Racing with Felix Sabates
7	Road America	(United States) Ricky Taylor (Italy) Max Angelelli	(United States) Scott Pruett (Mexico) Memo Rojas	(United States) Scott Pruett (Mexico) Memo Rojas
7	Road America	#42 Team Sahlen	#42 Team Sahlen	#31 Marsh Racing
7	Road America	(United States) John Edwards (United States) Wayne Nonnamaker	(United States) John Edwards (United States) Wayne Nonnamaker	(United States) Eric Curran (United States) John Heinricy
8	Laguna Seca	#10 SunTrust Racing	#99 GAINSCO/Bob Stallings Racing	#99 GAINSCO/Bob Stallings Racing
8	Laguna Seca	(United States) Ricky Taylor (Italy) Max Angelelli	(United States) Jon Fogarty (United States) Alex Gurney	(United States) Jon Fogarty (United States) Alex Gurney
8	Laguna Seca	#59 Brumos Racing	#59 Brumos Racing	#59 Brumos Racing
8	Laguna Seca	(United States) Andrew Davis (United States) Leh Keen	(United States) Andrew Davis (United States) Leh Keen	(United States) Andrew Davis (United States) Leh Keen
9	New Jersey	#10 SunTrust Racing	#99 GAINSCO/Bob Stallings Racing	#01 Chip Ganassi Racing with Felix Sabates
9	New Jersey	(United States) Ricky Taylor (Italy) Max Angelelli	(United States) Jon Fogarty (United States) Alex Gurney	(United States) Scott Pruett (Mexico) Memo Rojas
9	New Jersey	#42 Team Sahlen	#70 SpeedSource	#70 SpeedSource
9	New Jersey	(United States) John Edwards (United States) Wayne Nonnamaker	(United States) Jonathan Bomarito (Canada) Sylvain Tremblay	(United States) Jonathan Bomarito (Canada) Sylvain Tremblay
10	Watkins Glen Short	#10 SunTrust Racing	#01 Chip Ganassi Racing with Felix Sabates	#10 SunTrust Racing
10	Watkins Glen Short	(United States) Ricky Taylor (Italy) Max Angelelli	(United States) Scott Pruett (Mexico) Memo Rojas	(Italy) Max Angelelli (United States) Ricky Taylor
10	Watkins Glen Short	#57 Stevenson Motorsport	#88 Autohaus Motorsports	#67 The Racer's Group
10	Watkins Glen Short	(United Kingdom) Robin Liddell (Denmark) Jan Magnussen	(United States) Jordan Taylor (United States) Bill Lester	(United States) Spencer Pumpelly (United States) Steven Bertheau
11	Montreal	#99 GAINSCO/Bob Stallings Racing	#99 GAINSCO/Bob Stallings Racing	#99 GAINSCO/Bob Stallings Racing
11	Montreal	(United States) Jon Fogarty (United States) Alex Gurney	(United States) Jon Fogarty (United States) Alex Gurney	(United States) Jon Fogarty (United States) Alex Gurney
11	Montreal	#31 Marsh Racing	#94 Turner Motorsport	#57 Stevenson Motorsport
11	Montreal	(United States) Boris Said (Australia) Owen Kelly	(United States) Billy Johnson (Canada) Paul Dalla Lana	(United Kingdom) Robin Liddell (Denmark) Ronnie Bremer
12	Mid-Ohio	#99 GAINSCO/Bob Stallings Racing	#10 SunTrust Racing	#8 Starworks Motorsport
12	Mid-Ohio	(United States) Jon Fogarty (United States) Alex Gurney	(United States) Ricky Taylor (Italy) Max Angelelli	(United Kingdom) Ryan Dalziel (Venezuela) Enzo Potolicchio
12	Mid-Ohio	#57 Stevenson Motorsport	#42 Team Sahlen	#57 Stevenson Motorsport
12	Mid-Ohio	(Denmark) Ronnie Bremer (United Kingdom) Robin Liddell	(United States) John Edwards (United States) Wayne Nonnamaker	(Denmark) Ronnie Bremer (United Kingdom) Robin Liddell

== Championship Standings ==
=== Daytona Prototypes ===
==== Driver's (Top 30) ====
Pos	Driver	R24	HOM	BIR	VIR	LIM	S6H	ELK	LAG	NJ	WAT	MON	LEX	Points
1	(United States) Scott Pruett	1	1	1	2	7	2	1	2	1	2	5	2	385
1	(Mexico) Memo Rojas	1	1	1	2	7	2	1	2	1	2	5	2	385
2	(Italy) Max Angelelli	5	3	11	4	1	1	3	3	2	1	2	11	353
2	(United States) Ricky Taylor	5	3	11	4	**1**	**1**	**3**	**3**	**2**	**1**	2	11	353
3	(United States) David Donohue	9	2	5	3	5	5	6	6	6	6	3	5	318
3	(United States) Darren Law	9	2	5	3	5	5	6	6	6	6	3	5	318
4	(United States) Jon Fogarty	12	**8**	2	10	4	3	2	1	3	12†	**1**	**3**	315
4	(United States) Alex Gurney	12	8	2	10	4	3	2	1	3	12†	1	3	315
5	(Portugal) João Barbosa	3	5	7	1	6	7	7	8	5	7	6	4	314
5	(United States) J. C. France	3	5	7	1	6	7	7	8	5	7	6	4	314
6	(Brazil) Oswaldo Negri	10	9	6	6	2	4	5	5	8	5	9	8	299
6	(United States) John Pew	10	9	6	6	2	4	5	5	8	5	9	8	299
7	(United States) Paul Edwards	14	11	9	**8**	9	8	10	10	7	10	4	10	263
7	(Spain) Antonio García	14	11	**9**	8	9	8	10	10	7	10	4	10	263
8	(United States) Brian Frisselle	17	13	10	5	8	6	9	9	9	8	8	9	263
9	(United States) Burt Frisselle	9	4	4	9		5	11		9	4	7	9	242
10	(United States) Henri Richard	17	13	10	5	8	6	9	9	9	8	8		241
11	(United Kingdom) Ryan Dalziel	16	12	3	11†	3	9†	4	7	4	3	10†	1	240
12	(United States) Terry Borcheller	3	5	7	1	6	7	7	8	5	7†		4†	237
13	(Venezuela) Enzo Potolicchio	15	7	8	7	10†		8		10	11	11	1	206
14	(Venezuela) Alex Popow	15	7	8	7	10†		8	7	10	3	10	6†	206
15	(Canada) Mark Wilkins	8	4	4	9			11			4	7	6	198
16	(Canada) Mike Forest	16	12	3	11†	3	9†	4	4					151
17	(United Kingdom) Mark Blundell	4	6								9		7	99
18	(United States) Matt Bell	17					6		11					61
19	(United States) Zak Brown	4									9		7†	50
20	(Brazil) Raphael Matos	11								4				48
21	(Canada) Michael Valiante	10	6											46
22	(Germany) Jörg Bergmeister	**13**									11			38
23	(United States) Joey Hand	1												35
23	(United States) Graham Rahal	1												35
24	(New Zealand) Scott Dixon	2												32
24	(United Kingdom) Dario Franchitti	2												32
24	(United States) Jamie McMurray	2												32
24	(Colombia) Juan Pablo Montoya	2												32
25	(Brazil) Christian Fittipaldi	3												30
25	(Italy) Max Papis	3												30
26	(United Kingdom) Martin Brundle	4												28
26	(United States) Mark Patterson	4												28
27	(Australia) Ryan Briscoe	5												26
28	(Sweden) Niclas Jönsson	6												25
28	(United States) Tracy Krohn	6												25
28	(France) Nicolas Minassian	6												25
28	(Brazil) Ricardo Zonta	6												25
29	(United States) A. J. Allmendinger	7												24
29	(United States) Michael McDowell	7												24
29	(United Kingdom) Justin Wilson	7												24
30	(France) Christophe Bouchut	8												23
30	(Mexico) Luis Díaz	8												23
30	(United States) Scott Tucker	8												23

Colour	Result
Gold	Winner
Silver	Second place
Bronze	Third place
Green	Points classification
Blue	Non-points classification
Blue	Non-classified finish (NC)
Purple	Retired, not classified (Ret)
Red	Did not qualify (DNQ)
Red	Did not pre-qualify (DNPQ)
Black	Disqualified (DSQ)
White	Did not start (DNS)
White	Withdrew (WD)
White	Race cancelled (C)
Blank	Did not practice (DNP)
Blank	Did not arrive (DNA)
Blank	Excluded (EX)

**Bold** - Pole position
Italics - Fastest lap

===== Notes =====
- Drivers denoted by † did not complete sufficient laps in order to score points.

==== Chassis ====
Pos	Chassis	R24	HOM	BIR	VIR	LIM	S6H	ELK	LAG	NJ	WAT	MON	LEX	Pts
1	(United States) Riley	1	1	1	1	2	2	1	1	1	2	1	1	411
2	(Italy) Dallara	5	3	10	4	1	1	3	3	2	1	2	9	356
3	(United States) Coyote	14	11	9	8	9	8	10	10	7	10	4	10	263
4	(United Kingdom) Lola	6												25
Pos	Chassis	R24	HOM	BIR	VIR	LIM	S6H	ELK	LAG	NJ	WAT	MON	LEX	Pts

==== Engine ====
Pos	Engine	R24	HOM	BIR	VIR	LIM	S6H	ELK	LAG	NJ	WAT	MON	LEX	Pts
1	(Germany) BMW	1	1	1	2	7	2	1	2	1	2	5	2	385
2	(United States) Chevrolet	5	3	2	4	1	1	2	1	2	1	1	3	385
3	(United States) Ford	4	6	3	5	2	4	4	4	4	3	8	1	341
4	(Germany) Porsche	3	2	5	1	5	5	6	6	5	6	3	4	334
Pos	Engine	R24	HOM	BIR	VIR	LIM	S6H	ELK	LAG	NJ	WAT	MON	LEX	Pts

=== Grand Touring ===
==== Driver's (Top 10) ====
Pos	Driver	R24	HOM	BIR	VIR	LIM	S6H	ELK	LAG	NJ	WAT	MON	LEX	Points
1	(United States) Andrew Davis	5	7	10	5	3	1	6	1	12	7	5	4	319
1	(United States) Leh Keen	5	7	10	5	3	1	6	1	12	7	5	4	319
2	(United States) Jordan Taylor	14	6	7	1	2	2	5	10	4	2	9	8	317
2	(United States) Bill Lester	14	6	7	1	2	2	5	10	4	2	9	8	317
3	(United States) Jonathan Bomarito	6	4	3	14	12	10	7	3	1	4	2	5	315
3	(Canada) Sylvain Tremblay	6	4	3	14	12	10	7	3	1	4	2	5	315
4	(United States) Dane Cameron	10	5	6	4	4	8	13	9	3	6	3	3	306
4	(United States) James Gue	10	5	6	4	4	8	13	9	3	6	3	3	306
5	(United States) Emil Assentato	27	2	4	8	10	3	10	2	6	10	10	2	302
5	(United States) Jeff Segal	27	2	4	8	10	3	10	2	6	10	10	2	302
6	(United States) Craig Stanton	4	3	5	15	9	5	4	7	8	3	7	7	301
6	(United States) John Potter	4	3	5	15	9	5	4	7	8	3	7	7	301
7	(Canada) Paul Dalla Lana	17	1	1	3	6	11	8	8	13	5	4	16	294
8	(United States) Wayne Nonnamaker	7	9	11	9	7	7	2	14	2	8	6	6	290
9	(United Kingdom) Robin Liddell	12	16	9	7	1	15	12	4	5	20	1	1	285
10	(United States) Gunter Schaldach	23	8	2	2	8	4	16†	6	7	9	8	9	270

Colour	Result
Gold	Winner
Silver	Second place
Bronze	Third place
Green	Points classification
Blue	Non-points classification
Blue	Non-classified finish (NC)
Purple	Retired, not classified (Ret)
Red	Did not qualify (DNQ)
Red	Did not pre-qualify (DNPQ)
Black	Disqualified (DSQ)
White	Did not start (DNS)
White	Withdrew (WD)
White	Race cancelled (C)
Blank	Did not practice (DNP)
Blank	Did not arrive (DNA)
Blank	Excluded (EX)

===== Notes =====
- Drivers denoted by † did not complete sufficient laps in order to score points.

==== Engine ====
Pos	Engine	R24	HOM	BIR	VIR	LIM	S6H	ELK	LAG	NJ	WAT	MON	LEX	Points
1	(United States) Chevrolet	12	6	2	1	1	2	1	4	4	2	1	1	371
2	(Japan) Mazda	3	2	3	4	4	3	2	2	1	4	2	2	369
3	(Germany) Porsche	1	3	5	5	3	1	3	1	8	1	5	4	359
4	(Germany) BMW	17	1	1	3	6	11	8	8	10	5	4	15	296
5	(United States) Ford		19				13				12			49
6	(Italy) Ferrari	15												16
Pos	Engine	R24	HOM	BIR	VIR	LIM	S6H	ELK	LAG	NJ	WAT	MON	LEX	Pts
