= João Barbosa =

Portuguese racing driver (born 1975)

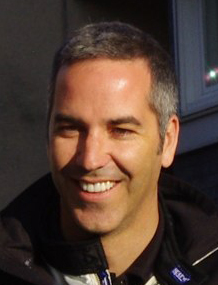
- Barbosa at the 2011 24 Hours of Le Mans driver parade
- Nationality: (Portugal) Portuguese
- Born: João Ricardo da Silva Coelho Barbosa; 11 March 1975 (age 51) Porto, Portugal
- Categorisation: FIA Platinum (until 2013, 2016–2018); FIA Gold (2014–2015, 2019–2026); FIA Silver (2027–)

IMSA SportsCar Championship career
- Debut season: 2014
- Current team: Sean Creech Motorsport
- Car number: 33
- Championships: 2
- Wins: 11
- Podiums: 38
- Best finish: 1st in 2014 & 2015 (Prototype)

Previous series
- Rolex Sports Car Series; American Le Mans Series

24 Hours of Le Mans career
- Years: 2004–2009, 2011, 2015- 2016
- Teams: Rollcentre Racing, Pescarolo Sport
- Best finish: 4th (2007)

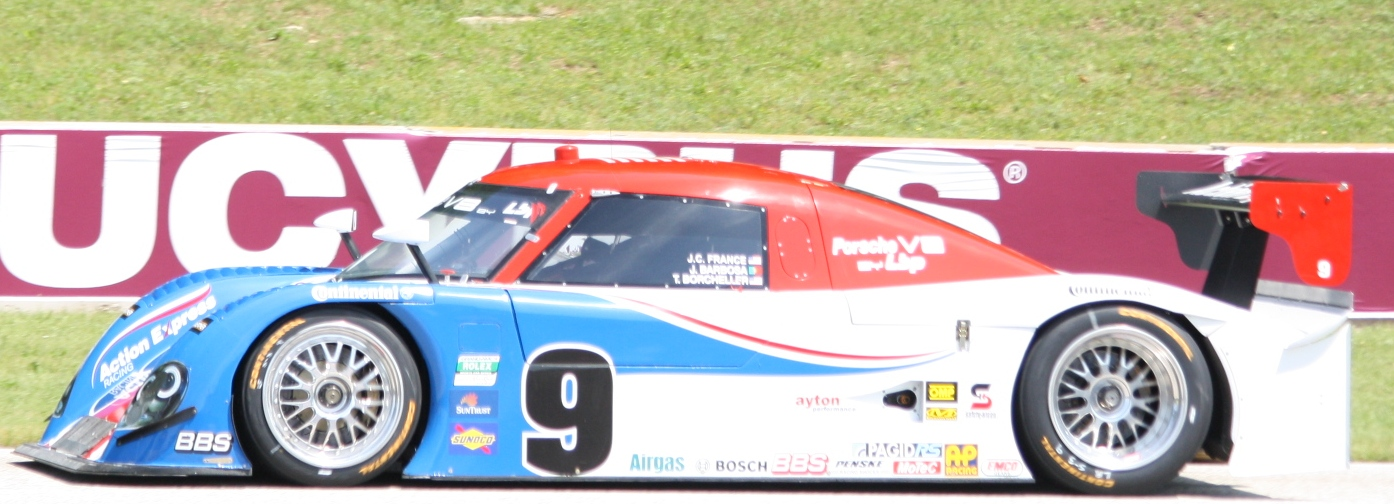
2011 Rolex Sports Car

João Ricardo da Silva Coelho Barbosa (born 11 March 1975 in Porto, Portugal) is a Portuguese auto racing driver. He currently competes in the IMSA WeatherTech SportsCar Championship for Sean Creech Motorsport in the LMP2 class.

Barbosa was runner-up in the GTS class of the Grand-Am Rolex Sports Car Series in 2003 and fifth in the DP class in 2008, accumulating a total of seven overall victories. Barbosa won the 2010 and 2014, and was third in 2009 and 2011 and fourth in 2007 and 2013. Also resulted fourth in the 2007 24 Hours of Le Mans and 2012 12 Hours of Sebring.

== Career ==
=== Early years ===
Barbosa began racing in karts and was the Portuguese kart racing champion for the 1988 and 1989 seasons. In 1994, he won the Portuguese Formula Ford championship; in 1995 he won the Italian Formula Alfa Boxster championship. In 1995, he won the Italian Formula Europa Boxer title, and in 1996 was runner up in the Italian Formula 3. Barbosa moved to the United States in 1997, where he was seventh in the 1997 Formula Atlantic.

=== Mosler (1999–2003) ===
In 1999, Barbossa contested two rounds in the United States Road Racing Championship with a Mosler Intruder official achieving victory at Lime Rock Park, and the Homestead's race of FIA GT Championship. In 2000, he participated in the first two races of the American Le Mans Series with a Colucci's Porsche 911. In 2001, he returned to run with Mosler three races of the Grand-Am Rolex Sports Car Series, achieving a third place in the GT class at the 6 Hours of Watkins Glen.

Barbosa continued as Mosler's driver in 2002 Grand-Am series season. He earn a win and three second places in ten races, and finished fourth in the drivers' championship in the GT class. In 2003, he ran eight rounds with a GTS class' Molser, and two in a Ford Mustang in the same class. He earned three wins, and seven podiums, resulting runner-up championship. That same year, he completed in the 1000 km Spa and the 24 Hours of Spa with Mosler, achieving a class victory in the first of them.

=== Rollcentre and Brumos (2004–2009) ===
Barbosa completed eight of twelve Rolex Sports Car Series rounds with a Maserati 2004 in the GT class. Scored two third places and was placed 16th in the championship. Moreover, drives a Dallara SP1 of Rollcentre Racing in the LMP1 class: came fifth in the 12 Hours of Sebring, retired in the 24 Hours of Le Mans, and earned a fifth place and a sixth in the four races of the Le Mans Series. Finally, disputed the Hockenheim race of the FIA GT Championship and Petit Le Mans ALMS in a Saleen S7.

In 2005, Barbosa continued driving a Rollcentre Dallara in the LMP1 class. He abandoned at the 12 Hours of Sebring, and achieved two third places and a fifth in the five races of the Le Mans Series. Meanwhile, he completed three rounds of the Grand-Am series with a Maserati, placing fifth in Mont-Tremblant race with Jeff Segal. Barbosa completed four rounds of the Le Mans Series 2006 with Rollcentre, now driving a Radical SR9 LMP2, obtaining a third class in the 1000 km Nürburgring as best result. Meanwhile, he finished fifth in his class at the 24 Hours of Le Mans, although dozens of laps down. In the 1000 km of Spa he drove a Perrier's Porsch 911, being sixth in the GT2 class. Also, raced the FIA GT Championship Hungaroring race in a Saleen S7. He also ran two rounds of the Grand-Am series, now in the Daytona Prototype class. Barbosa continued with Rollcentre in the 2007 season. At the wheel of a Pescarolo 01 LMP1 class, resulted third place overall in the 1000 km of Silverstone and fourth at the 1000 km of Valencia with Stuart Hall, which was placed eighth in the drivers' championship and fourth in the team. In turn, was fourth in the 24 Hours of Le Mans, counting as third driver a Martin Short. That same year, he came in fourth the 24 Hours of Daytona Grand-Am series and arrived late in the 6 Hours of Watkins Glen, in both cases with the Brumos Riley-Porsche.

Barbosa returned to contest the 2008 Rolex Sports Car Series season, competing with Brumos Racing. Accompanied by JC France, he was fourth in five opportunities with a Riley-Porsche. Thus, he placed fifth in the drivers' championship in Daytona Prototype class, behind Scott Pruett / Memo Rojas and Jon Fogarty / Alex Gurney. In Europe, he continued as Rollcentre driver with whom he raced in the 24 Hours of Le Mans and four races of the Le Mans Series with a Pescarolo 01. In 2009, Barbosa continued in the Rolex Sports Car Series with JC France for Brumos Racing. They won in Homestead, were third in the 24 Hours of Daytona and fifth at Mid-Ohio, and being 16th in the drivers' championship. In Europe, he completed three endurance races with a Pescarolo 01 official with Bruce Jouanny, earning a sixth overall place in the 1000 km de Catalunya and an eighth in the 24 Hours of Le Mans, counting as third driver Christophe Tinseau.

=== Action Express (2010–2019) ===
Action Express Racing hired Barbosa to contest the 2010 Rolex Sports Car Series season with a Riley-Porsche DP chassis with Terry Borcheller. He won the 24 Hours of Daytona, counting as additional drivers Ryan Dalziel and Mike Rockenfeller. He was fourth at Lime Rock and tenth in five races and finishing 20th in the final placement. On the other hand, he completed two endurances races of the American LeMans Series with Extreme Speed Ferrari F430, being sixth in the GT2 class at the 12 Hours of Sebring. Barbosa returned to have as co-driver of JC France in the Action Express in the Rolex Sports Car Series in 2011. He won at Virginia, with Terry Borcheller as third driver, and was third in the 24 Hours of Daytona, with Christian Fittipaldi and Max Papis as additional drivers. With five top-fives in 12 races, he placed ninth in the drivers' championship in the DP class.

Moreover, Barbosa also competed in five races of the Intercontinental Le Mans Cup with Level 5 with Scott Tucker and Christophe Bouchut. He managed sixth place overall and first in the LMP2 class at Petit Le Mans, and was third in the LMP2 class at the 24 Hours of Le Mans and the 6 Hours of Imola. In 2012, Action Express started to use the new Chevrolet Corvette DP in the Grand-Am series. Barbosa scored two wins in Detroit and the 6 Hours of Watkins Glen, and had six top-fives with Darren Law, culminating ninth in the drivers' championship. Meanwhile, he raced in the 12 Hours of Sebring ALMS with Level 5. He resulted fourth place overall and first in the ALMS P2-class, although behind a World Endurance Championship LMP2 car.

Barbosa completed in the 2013 Grand-Am series with Action Express, counting as co-driver Christian Fittipaldi in most races. He won the 6 Hours of Watkins Glen and Mid-Ohio, second in Detroit and Road America and fourth in the 24 Hours of Daytona and Kansas. He finished tenth in the drivers' championship DP class. Barbosa remained with Fittipaldi in the Action Express team in the 2014 United SportsCar Championship season, formed from the merger of the Grand-Am and ALMS series. He won the 24 Hours of Daytona, counting as additional driver Sébastien Bourdais.

In 2015, also with Action Express Team, finished in second in 24 Hours of Daytona and won the 12 Hours of Sebring (with his teammates Fittipaldi and Bourdais).

== Racing record ==
=== 24 Hours of Daytona results ===
Year	Team	Co-drivers	Car	Class	Laps	Pos.	Class Pos.
2001	(United States) Morrison/Mosler Racing	(United States) Scott Deware (United States) John Heinricy (United States) Jim Minneker	Mosler MT900R	GT	61	DNF	DNF
2002	(France) Perspective Racing	(Belgium) Michele Neugarten (France) Thierry Perrier	Mosler MT900R	GT	653	13th	5th
2003	(France) Perspective Racing	(France) Jérôme Policand (Belgium) Michele Neugarten (United Kingdom) Andy Wallace	Mosler MT900R	GTS	641	9th	**1st**
2006	(United States) Brumos Racing	(United States) J. C. France (United States) Ted Christopher (United States) Hurley Haywood	Fabcar FDSC/03-Porsche	DP	559	DNF	DNF
2007	(United States) Brumos Porsche/Kendall	(United States) J. C. France (United States) Hurley Haywood (Brazil) Roberto Moreno	Riley Mk. XI-Porsche	DP	662	4th	4th
2008	(United States) Brumos Racing	(United States) J. C. France (United States) Hurley Haywood (United States) Terry Borcheller	Riley Mk. XI-Porsche	DP	622	23rd	11th
2009	(United States) Brumos Racing	(United States) J. C. France (United States) Hurley Haywood (United States) Terry Borcheller	Riley Mk. XI-Porsche	DP	735	**3rd**	**3rd**
2010	(United States) Action Express Racing	(United States) Terry Borcheller (United Kingdom) Ryan Dalziel (Germany) Mike Rockenfeller	Riley Mk. XI-Porsche	DP	755	**1st**	**1st**
2011	(United States) Action Express Racing	(United States) Terry Borcheller (United States) J. C. France (Brazil) Christian Fittipaldi (Italy) Max Papis	Riley Mk. XI-Porsche	DP	721	**3rd**	**3rd**
2012	(United States) Action Express Racing	(United States) Terry Borcheller (United States) J. C. France (Italy) Max Papis	Coyote Corvette DP	DP	739	9th	9th
2013	(United States) Action Express Racing	(Brazil) Christian Fittipaldi (United States) Burt Frisselle (Germany) Mike Rockenfeller	Coyote Corvette DP	DP	708	4th	4th
2014	(United States) Action Express Racing	(Brazil) Christian Fittipaldi (France) Sébastien Bourdais	Coyote Corvette DP	P	695	**1st**	**1st**
2015	(United States) Action Express Racing	(Brazil) Christian Fittipaldi (France) Sébastien Bourdais	Coyote Corvette DP	P	740	**2nd**	**2nd**
2016	(United States) Action Express Racing	(Brazil) Christian Fittipaldi (Portugal) Filipe Albuquerque (United States) Scott Pruett	Coyote Corvette DP	P	731	4th	4th
2017	(United States) Mustang Sampling Racing	(Brazil) Christian Fittipaldi (Portugal) Filipe Albuquerque	Cadillac DPi-V.R	P	659	**2nd**	**2nd**
2018	(United States) Mustang Sampling Racing	(Brazil) Christian Fittipaldi (Portugal) Filipe Albuquerque	Cadillac DPi-V.R	P	808	**1st**	**1st**
2019	(United States) Mustang Sampling Racing	(Brazil) Christian Fittipaldi (Portugal) Filipe Albuquerque	Cadillac DPi-V.R	DPi	573	9th	7th
2020	(United States) Mustang Sampling Racing	(France) Sébastien Bourdais (France) Loic Duval	Cadillac DPi-V.R	P	833	**3rd**	**3rd**
2021	(United States) Sean Creech Motorsport	(United States) Lance Willsey (United Kingdom) Wayne Boyd (France) Yann Clairay	Ligier JS P320	LMP3	754	42nd	**2nd**
2022	(United States) Sean Creech Motorsport	(United States) Lance Willsey (Denmark) Malthe Jakobsen (United Kingdom) Sebastian Priaulx	Ligier JS P320	LMP3	722	15th	**2nd**
2023	(United States) Sean Creech Motorsport	(Chile) Nico Pino (United States) Nolan Siegel (United States) Lance Willsey	Ligier JS P320	LMP3	725	29th	**2nd**
2024	(United States) Sean Creech Motorsport	(United Kingdom) Jonny Edgar (United States) Nolan Siegel (United States) Lance Willsey	Ligier JS P217	LMP2	510	45th ^{DNF}	9th ^{DNF}

=== 24 Hours of Le Mans results ===
Year	Team	Co-Drivers	Car	Class	Laps	Pos.	Class Pos.
2004	(United Kingdom) Rollcentre Racing	(United Kingdom) Martin Short (United Kingdom) Rob Barff	Dallara SP1-Judd	LMP1	230	DNF	DNF
2005	(United Kingdom) Rollcentre Racing	(United Kingdom) Martin Short (Belgium) Vanina Ickx	Dallara SP1-Judd	LMP1	318	16th	8th
2006	(United Kingdom) Rollcentre Racing	(United Kingdom) Martin Short (United Kingdom) Stuart Moseley	Radical SR9-Judd	LMP2	294	20th	5th
2007	(United Kingdom) Rollcentre Racing	(United Kingdom) Stuart Hall (United Kingdom) Martin Short	Pescarolo 01-Judd	LMP1	347	4th	4th
2008	(United Kingdom) Rollcentre Racing	(France) Stéphan Grégoire (Belgium) Vanina Ickx	Pescarolo 01-Judd	LMP1	352	11th	10th
2009	(France) Pescarolo Sport	(France) Christophe Tinseau (France) Bruce Jouanny	Pescarolo 01-Judd	LMP1	368	8th	8th
2011	(United States) Level 5 Motorsports	(United States) Scott Tucker (France) Christophe Bouchut	Lola B08/80-HPD	LMP2	319	10th	**3rd**
2015	(United States) Krohn Racing	(United States) Tracy Krohn (Sweden) Niclas Jönsson	Ligier JS P2-Judd	LMP2	323	32nd	12th
2016	(United States) Krohn Racing	(United States) Tracy Krohn (Sweden) Niclas Jönsson	Ligier JS P2-Nissan	LMP2	338	22nd	13th

=== Grand-Am Rolex Sports Car Series results ===
(key) (Races in bold indicate pole position; results in italics indicate fastest lap)

Year	Team	Class	Make	Engine	1	2	3	4	5	6	7	8	9	10	11	12	13	14	Rank	Points	Ref
2008	Brumos Racing	DP	Riley Mk. XI	Porsche 3.99L Flat-6	R24; 11	MIA; 7	MEX; 8	VIR; 13	MRY; 7	S6H; 9	MID; 5	DAY; 4	BAR; 7	MON; 4	WGI; 12	SON; 4	NJP; 4	MIL; 4	3rd	340	
2009	Brumos Racing	DP	Riley Mk. XI	Porsche 3.99L Flat-6	R24; 3	VIR; 8	NJP; 14	LAG; 13	S6H; 6	LEX; 5	DAY; 8	BAR; 9	WGI; 8	MON; 14†	MIL; 7	MIA; 1			9th	266	
2010	Action Express Racing	DP	Riley Mk. XI	Porsche 5.0L V8	R24; 1	MIA; 15	BAR; 10	VIR; 12	LIM; 4	S6H; 10	LEX; 10	DAY; 10	NJP; 11	WGI; 10	MON; 10	MIL; 12			13th	260	
2011	Action Express Racing	DP	Riley Mk. XI	Porsche 5.0L V8	R24; 3	MIA; 5	BAR; 7	VIR; 1	LIM; 6	S6H; 7	ELK; 7	LAG; 8	NJP; 5	WGI; 7	MON; 6	LEX; 4			5th	314	
2012	Action Express Racing	DP	Corvette DP (Coyote CPM)	Chevrolet 5.0L V8	R24; 9	BAR; 7	MIA; 8	NJP; 7	BEL; 1	LEX; 6	ELK; 6	S6H; 1	IMS; 5	WGI; 8	MON; 4	LAG; 5	LIM; 5		7th	342	
2013	Action Express Racing	DP	Corvette DP (Coyote)	Chevrolet 5.0L V8	R24; 4	TXS; 14	BAR; 9	ATL; 12	BEL; 2	LEX; 1	S6H; 1	IMS; 14	ELK; 2	KNS; 4	LAG; 7	LIM; 14			6th	306	

^{†} Barbosa did not complete sufficient laps in order to score full points.

=== WeatherTech SportsCar Championship results ===
(key)(Races in bold indicate pole position, Results are overall/class)

Year	Team	Class	Chassis	Engine	1	2	3	4	5	6	7	8	9	10	11	Rank	Points	Ref
2014	Action Express Racing	P	Coyote Corvette DP	Chevrolet 5.5L V8	DAY; 1	SIR; 3	LBH; 3	LGA; 4	DET; 6	S6H; 3	MOS; 4	IMS; 1	ELK; 1	COA; 3	PET; 2	**1st**	**349**	
2015	Action Express Racing	P	Coyote Corvette DP	Chevrolet 5.5L V8	DAY; 2	SIR; 1	LBH; 5	LGA; 4	BEL; 3	WGL; 3	MOS; 5	ELK; 2	AUS; 6	PET; 1		**1st**	**309**	
2016	Action Express Racing	P	Coyote Corvette DP	Chevrolet 5.5L V8	DAY; 4	SIR; 3	LBH; 2	LGA; 7	BEL; 2	WGL; 1	MOS; 2	ELK; 2	AUS; 3	PET; 5		**2nd**	**311**	
2017	Mustang Sampling Racing	P	Cadillac DPi-V.R	Cadillac 6.2 L V8	DAY; 2	SEB; 2	LBH; 7	AUS; 3	DET; 4	WGL; 1	MOS; 6	ELK; 6	LGA; 5	PET; 5		**3rd**	**284**	
2018	Mustang Sampling Racing	P	Cadillac DPi-V.R	Cadillac 5.5 L V8	DAY; 1	SEB; 10	LBH; 1	MOH; 4	BEL; 6	WGL	MOS	ELK; 7	LGA; DNS	PET		18th	168	
2019	Mustang Sampling Racing	DPi	Cadillac DPi-V.R	Cadillac 5.5 L V8	DAY; 7	SEB; 3	LBH; 1	MOH; 8	BEL; 6	WGL; 6	MOS; 10	ELK; 6	LGA; 5	ATL; 7		7th	258	
2020	JDC-Mustang Sampling Racing	DPi	Cadillac DPi-V.R	Cadillac 5.5 L V8	DAY; 3	DAY; 3	SEB; 3	ELK; 4	ATL; 4	MOH; 6	ATL	LGA	SEB			10th	171	
2021	Sean Creech Motorsport	LMP3	Ligier JS P320	Nissan VK56DE 5.6 L V8	DAY; 2	SEB; 5	MOH; 5	WGL	WGL	ELK	PET					16th	571	
2022	Sean Creech Motorsport	LMP3	Ligier JS P320	Nissan VK56DE 5.6 L V8	DAY; 2	SEB; 1	MOH; 6	WGL; 5	MOS; 6	**ELK**; **9**	PET; 3					4th	1790	
2023	Sean Creech Motorsport	LMP3	Ligier JS P320	Nissan VK56DE 5.6 L V8	**DAY**; **2**	SEB; 7	WGL; 7	MOS; 5	**ELK**; **2**	IMS; 6	PET					7th	1415	
2024	Sean Creech Motorsport	LMP2	Ligier JS P217	Gibson GK428 4.2 L V8	DAY; 9	SEB; 4	WGL; 11	MOS; 10	ELK; 8	IMS	ATL					23rd	1240	

Sporting positions
Preceded by Inaugural	IMSA SportsCar Championship; 2014 - 2015; With: Christian Fittipaldi	Succeeded by Dane Cameron; Eric Curran
