= 2011 24 Hours of Daytona =

49th annual event

Previous: 2010	Next: 2012
Index: Races | Winners

Track map of Daytona International Speedway

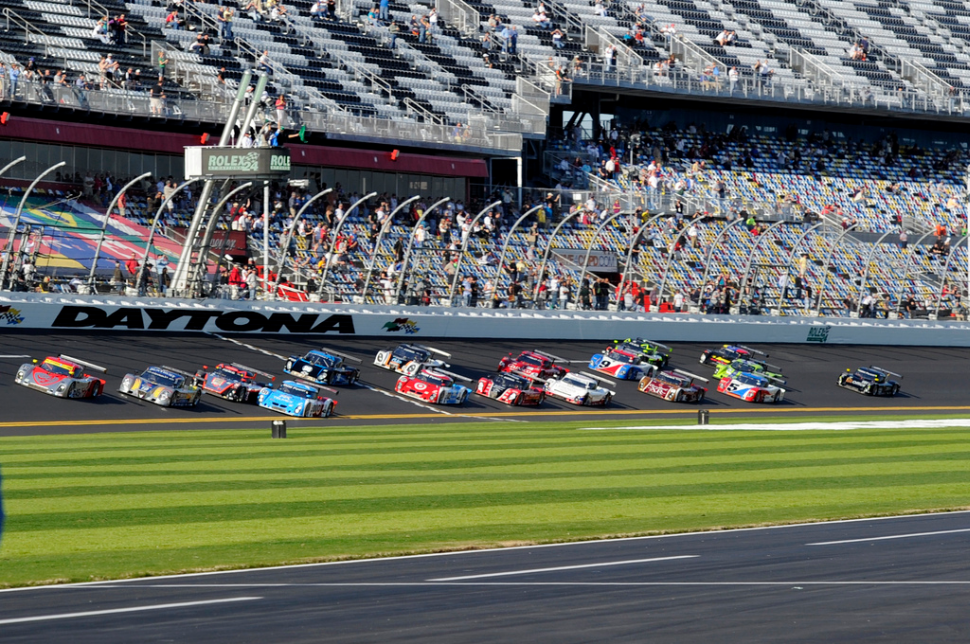
Start of the 2011 Rolex 24 at Daytona.

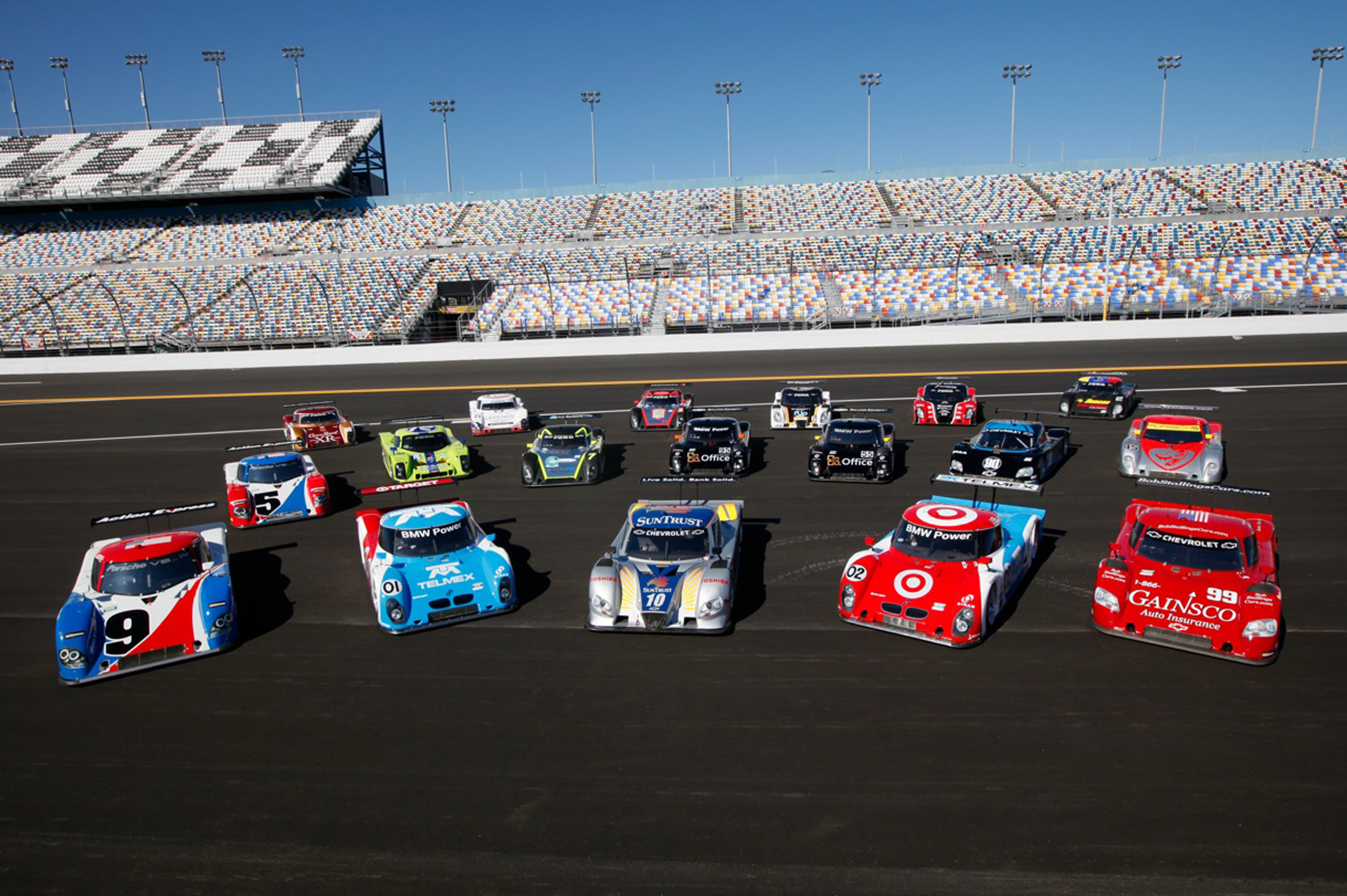
Prototypes run at the 2011 Rolex 24 at Daytona.

The 2011 Rolex 24 at Daytona ran on Saturday and Sunday January 29–30, 2011 at the Daytona International Speedway was the 49th running of the 24 Hours of Daytona endurance race. The first race of the 2011 Rolex Sports Car Series season, it was broadcast on Speed Channel, with fourteen hours of live coverage, in addition to a considerable attendance.

== Qualifying ==
Pole position for the race was won by Jörg Bergmeister of Germany, driving the #45 Daytona Prototype of Flying Lizard Motorsports, a Riley Technologies chassis powered by a Porsche engine, with a lap time of 1 minute 40.099 seconds. Pole for the Grand Touring category was won by Dominik Farnbacher in the #66 The Racer's Group Porsche 911, with a lap time of 1 minute 48.781 seconds.

== Results ==
Winning the race overall was the Daytona Prototype team of Chip Ganassi Racing, with drivers Scott Pruett, Memo Rojas, Graham Rahal, and Joey Hand driving the #01 Riley & Scott-BMW defeating Chip Ganassi Racing's second team, consisting of IndyCar drivers Scott Dixon and Dario Franchitti, and Sprint Cup teammates Jamie McMurray and Juan Pablo Montoya in the #02 Riley & Scott-BMW by just over two seconds in a one-lap sprint following a late caution flag. The win was Pruett's fourth overall victory in the 24 Hours of Daytona, and the fourth of four major auto racing wins by Ganassi in the last year, following victories in the 2010 Daytona 500, 2010 Indianapolis 500 and 2010 Brickyard 400; co-driver Rahal's victory came 30 years after his father, Bobby Rahal, won the race in 1981.

The GT division victory was claimed by The Racer's Group, the #67 Porsche 911 GT3 Cup driven by Andy Lally, Spencer Pumpelly, Brendan Gaughan, Wolf Henzler, and Steven Bertheau winning by a margin of one lap.

Patrick Dempsey, a television actor, placed third in the GT category in the #40 Mazda RX-8.

Although there were no serious accidents during the race, dense fog in the early morning hours resulted in a caution period lasting nearly three hours.

== Race results ==
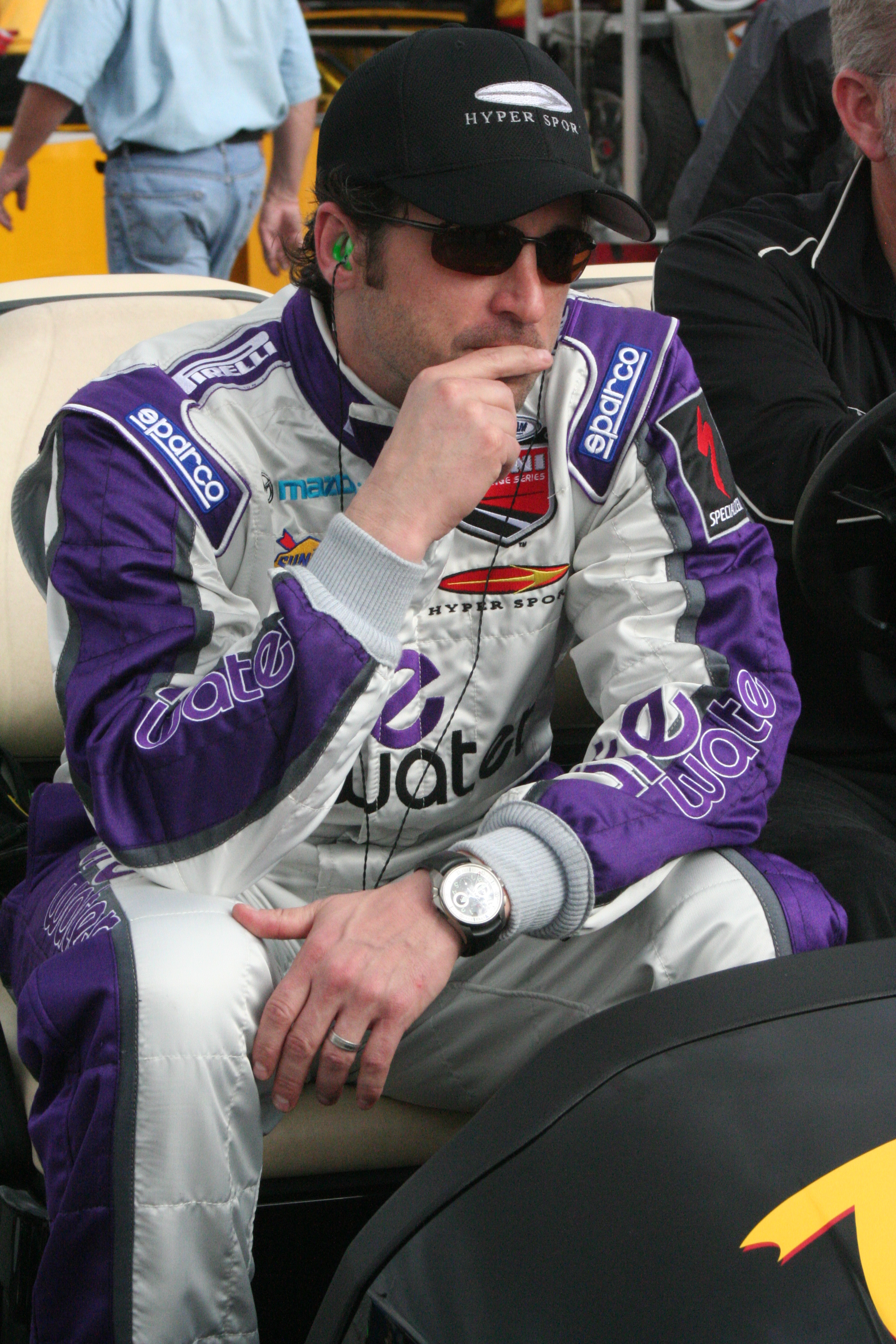
TV star Patrick Dempsey, seen here at the 2008 event, placed third in the GT class.

Class winners in bold.

Pos	Class	No	Team	Drivers	Chassis	Laps
Pos	Class	No	Team	Drivers	Engine	Laps
1	**DP**	**01**	**(United States) Chip Ganassi Racing with Felix Sabates**	**(United States) Scott Pruett (Mexico) Memo Rojas (United States) Graham Rahal (United States) Joey Hand**	**Riley**	**721**
1	**DP**	**01**	**(United States) Chip Ganassi Racing with Felix Sabates**	**(United States) Scott Pruett (Mexico) Memo Rojas (United States) Graham Rahal (United States) Joey Hand**	BMW 5.0L V8	**721**
2	DP	02	(United States) Chip Ganassi Racing with Felix Sabates	(New Zealand) Scott Dixon (Colombia) Juan Pablo Montoya (United Kingdom) Dario Franchitti (United States) Jamie McMurray	Riley	721
2	DP	02	(United States) Chip Ganassi Racing with Felix Sabates	(New Zealand) Scott Dixon (Colombia) Juan Pablo Montoya (United Kingdom) Dario Franchitti (United States) Jamie McMurray	BMW 5.0L V8	721
3	DP	9	(United States) Action Express Racing	(United States) Terry Borcheller (United States) J. C. France (Portugal) João Barbosa (Brazil) Christian Fittipaldi (Italy) Max Papis	Riley	721
3	DP	9	(United States) Action Express Racing	(United States) Terry Borcheller (United States) J. C. France (Portugal) João Barbosa (Brazil) Christian Fittipaldi (Italy) Max Papis	Porsche (LBP) 5.0L V8	721
4	DP	23	(United States) United Autosports with Michael Shank Racing	(United States) Zak Brown (United States) Mark Patterson (United Kingdom) Mark Blundell (United Kingdom) Martin Brundle	Riley	721
4	DP	23	(United States) United Autosports with Michael Shank Racing	(United States) Zak Brown (United States) Mark Patterson (United Kingdom) Mark Blundell (United Kingdom) Martin Brundle	Ford 5.0L V8	721
5	DP	10	(United States) SunTrust Racing	(Italy) Max Angelelli (United States) Ricky Taylor (Australia) Ryan Briscoe	Dallara	720
5	DP	10	(United States) SunTrust Racing	(Italy) Max Angelelli (United States) Ricky Taylor (Australia) Ryan Briscoe	Chevrolet 5.0L V8	720
6	DP	76	(United States) Krohn Racing	(United States) Tracy Krohn (Sweden) Niclas Jönsson (Brazil) Ricardo Zonta (France) Nicolas Minassian	Lola B08/70	720
6	DP	76	(United States) Krohn Racing	(United States) Tracy Krohn (Sweden) Niclas Jönsson (Brazil) Ricardo Zonta (France) Nicolas Minassian	Ford 5.0L V8	720
7	DP	6	(United States) Michael Shank Racing with Curb Agajanian	(United States) A. J. Allmendinger (United States) Michael McDowell (United Kingdom) Justin Wilson	Dallara	719
7	DP	6	(United States) Michael Shank Racing with Curb Agajanian	(United States) A. J. Allmendinger (United States) Michael McDowell (United Kingdom) Justin Wilson	Ford 5.0L V8	719
8	DP	55	(United States) Level 5 Motorsports	(United States) Scott Tucker (France) Christophe Bouchut (Mexico) Luis Díaz (Canada) Mark Wilkins	Riley	717
8	DP	55	(United States) Level 5 Motorsports	(United States) Scott Tucker (France) Christophe Bouchut (Mexico) Luis Díaz (Canada) Mark Wilkins	BMW 5.0L V8	717
9	DP	5	(United States) Action Express Racing	(United States) Darren Law (United States) David Donohue (United States) Buddy Rice (United States) Burt Frisselle	Riley	706
9	DP	5	(United States) Action Express Racing	(United States) Darren Law (United States) David Donohue (United States) Buddy Rice (United States) Burt Frisselle	Porsche (LBP) 5.0L V8	706
10	DP	60	(United States) Michael Shank Racing	(United States) John Pew (Brazil) Oswaldo Negri Jr. (Belgium) Marc Goossens (Canada) Michael Valiante	Riley	706
10	DP	60	(United States) Michael Shank Racing	(United States) John Pew (Brazil) Oswaldo Negri Jr. (Belgium) Marc Goossens (Canada) Michael Valiante	Ford 5.0L V8	706
11	DP	95	(United States) Level 5 Motorsports	(United States) Scott Tucker (United States) Ryan Hunter-Reay (United Kingdom) Richard Westbrook (Brazil) Raphael Matos	Riley	703
11	DP	95	(United States) Level 5 Motorsports	(United States) Scott Tucker (United States) Ryan Hunter-Reay (United Kingdom) Richard Westbrook (Brazil) Raphael Matos	BMW 5.0L V8	703
12	**GT**	**67**	**(United States) The Racer's Group**	**(United States) Steven Bertheau (United States) Brendan Gaughan (Germany) Wolf Henzler (United States) Andy Lally (United States) Spencer Pumpelly**	**Porsche 997 GT3 Cup**	**685**
12	**GT**	**67**	**(United States) The Racer's Group**	**(United States) Steven Bertheau (United States) Brendan Gaughan (Germany) Wolf Henzler (United States) Andy Lally (United States) Spencer Pumpelly**	Porsche 3.8L Flat-6	**685**
13	GT	48	(United States) Paul Miller Racing	(United States) Bryce Miller (United Kingdom) Tim Sugden (United States) Bryan Sellers (United Kingdom) Rob Bell	Porsche 997 GT3 Cup	684
13	GT	48	(United States) Paul Miller Racing	(United States) Bryce Miller (United Kingdom) Tim Sugden (United States) Bryan Sellers (United Kingdom) Rob Bell	Porsche 3.8L Flat-6	684
14	GT	40	(United States) Dempsey Racing	(United States) Joe Foster (United States) Patrick Dempsey (United States) Charles Espenlaub (United States) Tom Long	Mazda RX-8	681
14	GT	40	(United States) Dempsey Racing	(United States) Joe Foster (United States) Patrick Dempsey (United States) Charles Espenlaub (United States) Tom Long	Mazda 2.0L 3-Rotor	681
15	DP	99	(United States) GAINSCO/Bob Stallings Racing	(United States) Jon Fogarty (United States) Alex Gurney (United States) Jimmie Johnson	Riley	679
15	DP	99	(United States) GAINSCO/Bob Stallings Racing	(United States) Jon Fogarty (United States) Alex Gurney (United States) Jimmie Johnson	Chevrolet 5.0L V8	679
16	GT	44	(United States) Magnus Racing	(United States) John Potter (United States) Craig Stanton (Austria) Richard Lietz (Germany) Marco Holzer	Porsche 997 GT3 Cup	675
16	GT	44	(United States) Magnus Racing	(United States) John Potter (United States) Craig Stanton (Austria) Richard Lietz (Germany) Marco Holzer	Porsche 3.8L Flat-6	675
17	GT	59	(United States) Brumos Racing	(United States) Hurley Haywood (United States) Andrew Davis (United States) Leh Keen (Germany) Marc Lieb	Porsche 997 GT3 Cup	673
17	GT	59	(United States) Brumos Racing	(United States) Hurley Haywood (United States) Andrew Davis (United States) Leh Keen (Germany) Marc Lieb	Porsche 3.8L Flat-6	673
18	GT	70	(United States) SpeedSource	(United States) John Edwards (Canada) Sylvain Tremblay (United Kingdom) Adam Christodoulou (United States) Jonathan Bomarito	Mazda RX-8	670
18	GT	70	(United States) SpeedSource	(United States) John Edwards (Canada) Sylvain Tremblay (United Kingdom) Adam Christodoulou (United States) Jonathan Bomarito	Mazda 2.0L 3-Rotor	670
19	GT	42	(United States) Team Sahlen	(United States) Will Nonnamaker (United States) Wayne Nonnamaker (United States) Joe Nonnamaker (United States) Memo Gidley	Mazda RX-8	661
19	GT	42	(United States) Team Sahlen	(United States) Will Nonnamaker (United States) Wayne Nonnamaker (United States) Joe Nonnamaker (United States) Memo Gidley	Mazda 2.0L 3-Rotor	661
20	GT	4	(United States) The Racer's Group	(United States) Ryan Eversley (United States) Daniel Graeff (United States) Kenny Wallace (United States) Ron Yarab Jr. (United States) Richard Zahn Jr.	Porsche 997 GT3 Cup	659
20	GT	4	(United States) The Racer's Group	(United States) Ryan Eversley (United States) Daniel Graeff (United States) Kenny Wallace (United States) Ron Yarab Jr. (United States) Richard Zahn Jr.	Porsche 3.8L Flat-6	659
21	GT	18	(Belgium) Mühlner Motorsports America	(Canada) Mark Thomas (United States) Peter Ludwig (South Africa) Dion von Moltke (United States) Cory Friedman	Porsche 997 GT3 Cup	655
21	GT	18	(Belgium) Mühlner Motorsports America	(Canada) Mark Thomas (United States) Peter Ludwig (South Africa) Dion von Moltke (United States) Cory Friedman	Porsche 3.8L Flat-6	655
22 DNF	DP	45	(United States) Flying Lizard Motorsports	(United States) Patrick Long (Germany) Jörg Bergmeister (United States) Seth Neiman (United States) Johannes van Overbeek	Riley Mk. XI	654
22 DNF	DP	45	(United States) Flying Lizard Motorsports	(United States) Patrick Long (Germany) Jörg Bergmeister (United States) Seth Neiman (United States) Johannes van Overbeek	Porsche 4.0L Flat-6	654
23	GT	41	(United States) Dempsey Racing	(United States) James Gue (United States) Dane Cameron (United Kingdom) Ian James (Canada) Dave Lacey	Mazda RX-8	650
23	GT	41	(United States) Dempsey Racing	(United States) James Gue (United States) Dane Cameron (United Kingdom) Ian James (Canada) Dave Lacey	Mazda 2.0L 3-Rotor	650
24 DNF	DP	90	(United States) Spirit of Daytona Racing	(Spain) Antonio García (United States) Paul Edwards (Germany) Sascha Maassen	Coyote	649
24 DNF	DP	90	(United States) Spirit of Daytona Racing	(Spain) Antonio García (United States) Paul Edwards (Germany) Sascha Maassen	Chevrolet 5.0L V8	649
25	GT	47	(United States) Rick Ware Racing	(United States) Jeffrey Earnhardt (United States) Scott Monroe (United States) Doug Harrington (United States) Maurice Hull (United States) Brett Sandberg	Porsche 997 GT3 Cup	635
25	GT	47	(United States) Rick Ware Racing	(United States) Jeffrey Earnhardt (United States) Scott Monroe (United States) Doug Harrington (United States) Maurice Hull (United States) Brett Sandberg	Porsche 3.8L Flat-6	635
26	GT	57	(United States) Stevenson Motorsports	(United Kingdom) Robin Liddell (Denmark) Ronnie Bremer (Denmark) Jan Magnussen	Chevrolet Camaro GT.R	629
26	GT	57	(United States) Stevenson Motorsports	(United Kingdom) Robin Liddell (Denmark) Ronnie Bremer (Denmark) Jan Magnussen	Chevrolet 6.0L V8	629
27 DNF	GT	66	(United States) The Racer's Group	(Germany) Dominik Farnbacher (United States) Tim George Jr. (United States) Ben Keating (Germany) Lucas Luhr	Porsche 997 GT3 Cup	612
27 DNF	GT	66	(United States) The Racer's Group	(Germany) Dominik Farnbacher (United States) Tim George Jr. (United States) Ben Keating (Germany) Lucas Luhr	Porsche 3.8L Flat-6	612
28	GT	88	(United States) Autohaus Motorsports	(United States) Jordan Taylor (United States) Bill Lester (United States) Johnny O'Connell (Hong Kong) Matthew Marsh	Chevrolet Camaro GT.R	607
28	GT	88	(United States) Autohaus Motorsports	(United States) Jordan Taylor (United States) Bill Lester (United States) Johnny O'Connell (Hong Kong) Matthew Marsh	Chevrolet 6.0L V8	607
29	GT	81	(United States) DragonSpeed	(United States) Cort Wagner (United States) Fred Poordad (United States) Doug Baron (United States) Nick Jones	Ferrari F430 Challenge	588
29	GT	81	(United States) DragonSpeed	(United States) Cort Wagner (United States) Fred Poordad (United States) Doug Baron (United States) Nick Jones	Ferrari 4.3L V8	588
30 DNF	GT	54	(United States) The Racer's Group/Black Swan Racing/GMG Racing	(Netherlands) Jeroen Bleekemolen (United States) Tim Pappas (France) Patrick Pilet (United States) James Sofronas (United States) Bret Curtis	Porsche 997 GT3 Cup	578
30 DNF	GT	54	(United States) The Racer's Group/Black Swan Racing/GMG Racing	(Netherlands) Jeroen Bleekemolen (United States) Tim Pappas (France) Patrick Pilet (United States) James Sofronas (United States) Bret Curtis	Porsche 3.8L Flat-6	578
31	DP	2	(United States) Starworks Motorsport	(Venezuela) Enzo Potolicchio (Venezuela) Alex Popow (France) Romain Iannetta (Venezuela) E. J. Viso	Riley	577
31	DP	2	(United States) Starworks Motorsport	(Venezuela) Enzo Potolicchio (Venezuela) Alex Popow (France) Romain Iannetta (Venezuela) E. J. Viso	Ford 5.0L V8	577
32	GT	94	(United States) Turner Motorsport	(United States) Bill Auberlen (United States) Boris Said (Canada) Paul Dalla Lana (United States) Matt Plumb	BMW M3	565
32	GT	94	(United States) Turner Motorsport	(United States) Bill Auberlen (United States) Boris Said (Canada) Paul Dalla Lana (United States) Matt Plumb	BMW 5.0L V8	565
33 DNF	DP	8	(United States) Starworks Motorsport	(Canada) Mike Forest (United Kingdom) Ryan Dalziel (United States) Jim Lowe (United States) Colin Braun (Czech Republic) Tomáš Enge	Riley	552
33 DNF	DP	8	(United States) Starworks Motorsport	(Canada) Mike Forest (United Kingdom) Ryan Dalziel (United States) Jim Lowe (United States) Colin Braun (Czech Republic) Tomáš Enge	Ford 5.0L V8	552
34	GT	63	(United States) Team Spencer Motorsports	(United States) Rich Grupp (United States) David Murry (United States) Jim Downing (United States) Owen Trinkler	Mazda RX-8	544
34	GT	63	(United States) Team Spencer Motorsports	(United States) Rich Grupp (United States) David Murry (United States) Jim Downing (United States) Owen Trinkler	Mazda 2.0L 3-Rotor	544
35	GT	65	(United States) Chris Smith Racing	(United States) Bill Sweedler (United States) Shane Lewis (United States) Tom Sheehan (United States) Mitch Pagerey	Porsche 997 GT3 Cup	495
35	GT	65	(United States) Chris Smith Racing	(United States) Bill Sweedler (United States) Shane Lewis (United States) Tom Sheehan (United States) Mitch Pagerey	Porsche 3.8L Flat-6	495
36 DNF	GT	30	(United States) Racer's Edge Motorsports	(United States) Scott Rettich (United States) Mark Jensen (United States) Michael Marsal (United States) Gary Jensen (United States) Jade Buford	Mazda RX-8	453
36 DNF	GT	30	(United States) Racer's Edge Motorsports	(United States) Scott Rettich (United States) Mark Jensen (United States) Michael Marsal (United States) Gary Jensen (United States) Jade Buford	Mazda 2.0L 3-Rotor	453
37	GT	53	(United States) The Racer's Group/Nadeau Motorsports	(United States) Jim Michaelian (United States) Bob Doyle (United States) Coulter Mulligan (Italy) Joe Castellano (United States) Ken Dobson	Porsche 997 GT3 Cup	423
37	GT	53	(United States) The Racer's Group/Nadeau Motorsports	(United States) Jim Michaelian (United States) Bob Doyle (United States) Coulter Mulligan (Italy) Joe Castellano (United States) Ken Dobson	Porsche 3.8L Flat-6	423
38 DNF	GT	32	(United States) PR1 Motorsports	(United States) David Cheng (United States) Tom Papadopoulos (United Kingdom) Ryan Lewis (United States) Max Hyatt	BMW M6	402
38 DNF	GT	32	(United States) PR1 Motorsports	(United States) David Cheng (United States) Tom Papadopoulos (United Kingdom) Ryan Lewis (United States) Max Hyatt	BMW 5.0L V8	402
39 DNF	GT	07	(United States) Banner Racing	(United States) Bruce Ledoux (United States) Eric Curran (United States) Gunter Schaldach (United Kingdom) Oliver Gavin	Chevrolet Camaro GT.R	398
39 DNF	GT	07	(United States) Banner Racing	(United States) Bruce Ledoux (United States) Eric Curran (United States) Gunter Schaldach (United Kingdom) Oliver Gavin	Chevrolet 6.0L V8	398
40 DNF	GT	17	(United States) Burtin Racing	(Argentina) Claudio Burtin (Austria) Martin Ragginger (United Kingdom) Nick Tandy (France) Nicolas Armindo	Porsche 997 GT3 Cup	378
40 DNF	GT	17	(United States) Burtin Racing	(Argentina) Claudio Burtin (Austria) Martin Ragginger (United Kingdom) Nick Tandy (France) Nicolas Armindo	Porsche 3.8L Flat-6	378
41 DNF	GT	22	(United States) Bullet Racing	(Hong Kong) Darryl O'Young (United Kingdom) James Walker (United States) Brian Wong (United States) Eric Lux	Porsche 997 GT3 Cup	328
41 DNF	GT	22	(United States) Bullet Racing	(Hong Kong) Darryl O'Young (United Kingdom) James Walker (United States) Brian Wong (United States) Eric Lux	Porsche 3.8L Flat-6	328
42 DNF	DP	77	(United States) Doran Racing	(United States) Brian Frisselle (United States) Henri Richard (United States) Matt Bell (United Kingdom) Ross Kaiser	Dallara	312
42 DNF	DP	77	(United States) Doran Racing	(United States) Brian Frisselle (United States) Henri Richard (United States) Matt Bell (United Kingdom) Ross Kaiser	Ford 5.0L V8	312
43	GT	56	(United States) Bennett Racing	(United States) Mike Skeen (Canada) Jean-François Dumoulin (United States) Michael Davidson (United Kingdom) Glynn Geddie (United States) Dan Harrington	Ferrari F430 Challenge	286
43	GT	56	(United States) Bennett Racing	(United States) Mike Skeen (Canada) Jean-François Dumoulin (United States) Michael Davidson (United Kingdom) Glynn Geddie (United States) Dan Harrington	Ferrari 4.3L V8	286
44 DNF	DP	7	(United States) Starworks Motorsport	(United States) Doug Peterson (United States) R. J. Valentine (United States) Jared Beyer (United States) Scott Mayer (Belgium) Jan Heylen	Riley	215
44 DNF	DP	7	(United States) Starworks Motorsport	(United States) Doug Peterson (United States) R. J. Valentine (United States) Jared Beyer (United States) Scott Mayer (Belgium) Jan Heylen	Ford 5.0L V8	215
45 DNF	GT	69	(United States) SpeedSource	(United States) Emil Assentato (United States) Jeff Segal (United States) Nick Ham (United States) Anthony Lazzaro	Mazda RX-8	202
45 DNF	GT	69	(United States) SpeedSource	(United States) Emil Assentato (United States) Jeff Segal (United States) Nick Ham (United States) Anthony Lazzaro	Mazda 2.0L 3-Rotor	202
46 DNF	GT	43	(United States) Team Sahlen	(United States) Joe Sahlen (United States) Joe Nonnamaker (United States) Will Nonnamaker (United States) Wayne Nonnamaker (United States) Memo Gidley	Mazda RX-8	124
46 DNF	GT	43	(United States) Team Sahlen	(United States) Joe Sahlen (United States) Joe Nonnamaker (United States) Will Nonnamaker (United States) Wayne Nonnamaker (United States) Memo Gidley	Mazda 2.0L 3-Rotor	124
47 DNF	GT	36	(United States) Yellow Dragon Motorsports	(Canada) Taylor Hacquard (Canada) Chris Cumming (United States) Mikel Miller (United States) Justin Marks	Mazda RX-8	122
47 DNF	GT	36	(United States) Yellow Dragon Motorsports	(Canada) Taylor Hacquard (Canada) Chris Cumming (United States) Mikel Miller (United States) Justin Marks	Mazda 2.0L 3-Rotor	122
48 DNF	GT	86	(United States) Mitchum Motorsports	(United States) Joey Atterbury (United States) Cooper MacNeil (United States) Randy Pobst (United States) Derek Whitis	Porsche 997 GT3 Cup	121
48 DNF	GT	86	(United States) Mitchum Motorsports	(United States) Joey Atterbury (United States) Cooper MacNeil (United States) Randy Pobst (United States) Derek Whitis	Porsche 3.8L Flat-6	121
DNS	GT	11	(United States) TPN Racing/Blackforest	(Canada) David Empringham (Canada) Scott Maxwell (United States) Tom Nastasi (United States) Dave Russell	Ford Mustang Boss 302	-
DNS	GT	11	(United States) TPN Racing/Blackforest	(Canada) David Empringham (Canada) Scott Maxwell (United States) Tom Nastasi (United States) Dave Russell	Ford 5.0L V8	-
DNS	GT	00	(United States) Aten Motorsports	(France) Gabriel Abergel (France) Emmanuel Collard (United States) Davy Jones (United States) Steve Lisa (France) Xavier Pompidou	Ferrari F430 Challenge	-
DNS	GT	00	(United States) Aten Motorsports	(France) Gabriel Abergel (France) Emmanuel Collard (United States) Davy Jones (United States) Steve Lisa (France) Xavier Pompidou	Ferrari 4.3L V8	-

Rolex Sports Car Series
Previous race: None	2011 season	Next race: Grand Prix of Miami
