= Action Express Racing =

Racing team

- Founded: 2010
- Team principal(s): Jim France (Team Owner); Bob Johnson (Team Principal); Gary Nelson (Manager)
- Current series: WeatherTech SportsCar Championship
- Former series: Rolex Sports Car Series
- Current drivers: 31: Full-time (New Zealand) Earl Bamber (United Kingdom) Jack Aitken (Denmark) Frederik Vesti (Brazil) Felipe Drugovich
- Drivers' Championships: 7 ('14, '15, '16, '18, '21 '23 ‘26 IMSA)
- Website: axracing.com

Action Express Racing (AXR), currently racing as Cadillac Whelen for sponsorship reasons, is a sports car racing team that currently competes in the IMSA WeatherTech SportsCar Championship. The team is owned by former NASCAR CEO Jim France and run by Bob Johnson and former NASCAR champion crew chief Gary Nelson. Based in Denver, North Carolina, the team currently fields the No. 31 Whelen Engineering Cadillac V-LMDh for Jack Aitken, Earl Bamber and Frederik Vesti.

== History ==
=== Rolex Sports Car Series ===
Action Express Racing was founded in 2010 and ran in the former Rolex Sports Car Series. The team started out of the gate strong, by winning the 2010 Rolex 24 at Daytona. Their lineup in the No. 5 Riley Mk. XI featured João Barbosa, Terry Borcheller, Ryan Dalziel, and Audi LMP1 driver Mike Rockenfeller. The team's win was notable as their engine, a Porsche 5.0L V8 engine, was not sanctioned by Porsche itself, and was built by a third party based on the Porsche Cayenne. Full season drivers Barbosa and Borcheller were joined by J. C. France for a few rounds, but did not find the podium again, finishing 13th in points. Barbosa, Borcheller, and France reunited the following season, taking a podium at the 2011 Rolex 24 and winning at Virginia International Raceway, enough for Barbosa and France to finish 5th in points. The team also expanded to the No. 9 Riley-Porsche, driven by Darren Law, IndyCar driver Buddy Rice, David Donohue, and Burt Frissele. After reuniting Barbosa and France, the team opted to replace the latter with Law, scoring wins at Belle Isle and the 6 Hours of Watkins Glen.

For 2013, AXR fielded both the Nos. 5 and 9, this time as Corvette Daytona Prototypes. They were driven by Christian Fittipaldi, Brian Frissele, Barbosa and Burt Frissele, respectively. The team opted to join Barbosa and Fittipaldi together for the remained of the season after Road Atlanta, and the pair scored two wins at Mid-Ohio and Watkins Glen. While the Frissele brothers were teamed up, they only scored a single podium at Road America.

=== IMSA SportsCar Championship ===
==== Three straight championships (2014–2016) ====
For the newly formed IMSA SportsCar championship in 2014, AXR ran only the No. 5 of Barbosa and Fittipaldi for the full season, reducing the No. 9 crewed by the Frissele brothers and Jon Fogarty to only the North American Endurance Cup. AXR took three wins, including the team's second Rolex 24, en route to both the inaugural title and North American Endurance Cup for the No. 5. For 2015, AXR assumed operations of the No. 31 Whelen Racing team, hiring GTD champion Dane Cameron to pair with Eric Curran. The No. 5 took its second IMSA title as well as the NAEC on the back of two wins including the 12 Hours of Sebring and Petit Le Mans, while the No. 31 team won at Detroit and Road America to finish 3rd in points.

The No. 5 and No. 31 remained unchanged in 2016. With their worst finish being 6th and two wins at Canadian Tire Motorsports Park and Road America, the No. 31 Corvette team won the drivers title, with the No. 5 team taking home another North American Endurance Cup.

==== Cadillac partnership (2017–present) ====
From 2017, both Mustang Sampling Racing and Whelen Engineering Racing fielded Dallara-based Cadillac DPi-V.R machines. The Rolex 24 At Daytona saw the Mustang Sampling Cadillac knocked from the lead on the penultimate lap by Wayne Taylor Racing, another Cadillac team. Following the Daytona outing near-miss, the team continued to learn the new Cadillac Prototype as the No. 10 team had a strong start to the season. Mustang Sampling Racing returned to the winner circle at Watkins Glen and began to gain momentum. Even with both cars taking wins, compared to the last three seasons, had a relatively disappointing year, the Nos. 5 and 31 only winning one race each, and watched the rival Wayne Taylor Cadillac win the first five races on their way to the WeatherTech Championship, however the No. 5 once again took the NAEC, their fourth in a row.

2018 brought changes to the team. Christian Fittipaldi moved to an endurance driver/manager role in the team, while Dane Cameron left to join Team Penske's new Acura program. Their spots on the team were filled by Filipe Albuquerque and ex-F1 driver Felipe Nasr, respectively. The team started the 2018 season with a 1-2 finish at the Rolex 24, setting an all-time distance record. The Mustang Sampling car then won at Long Beach, with the Whelen Engineering Racing squad taking a victory at Detroit, and eventually capturing both the WSCC and NAEC for 2018.

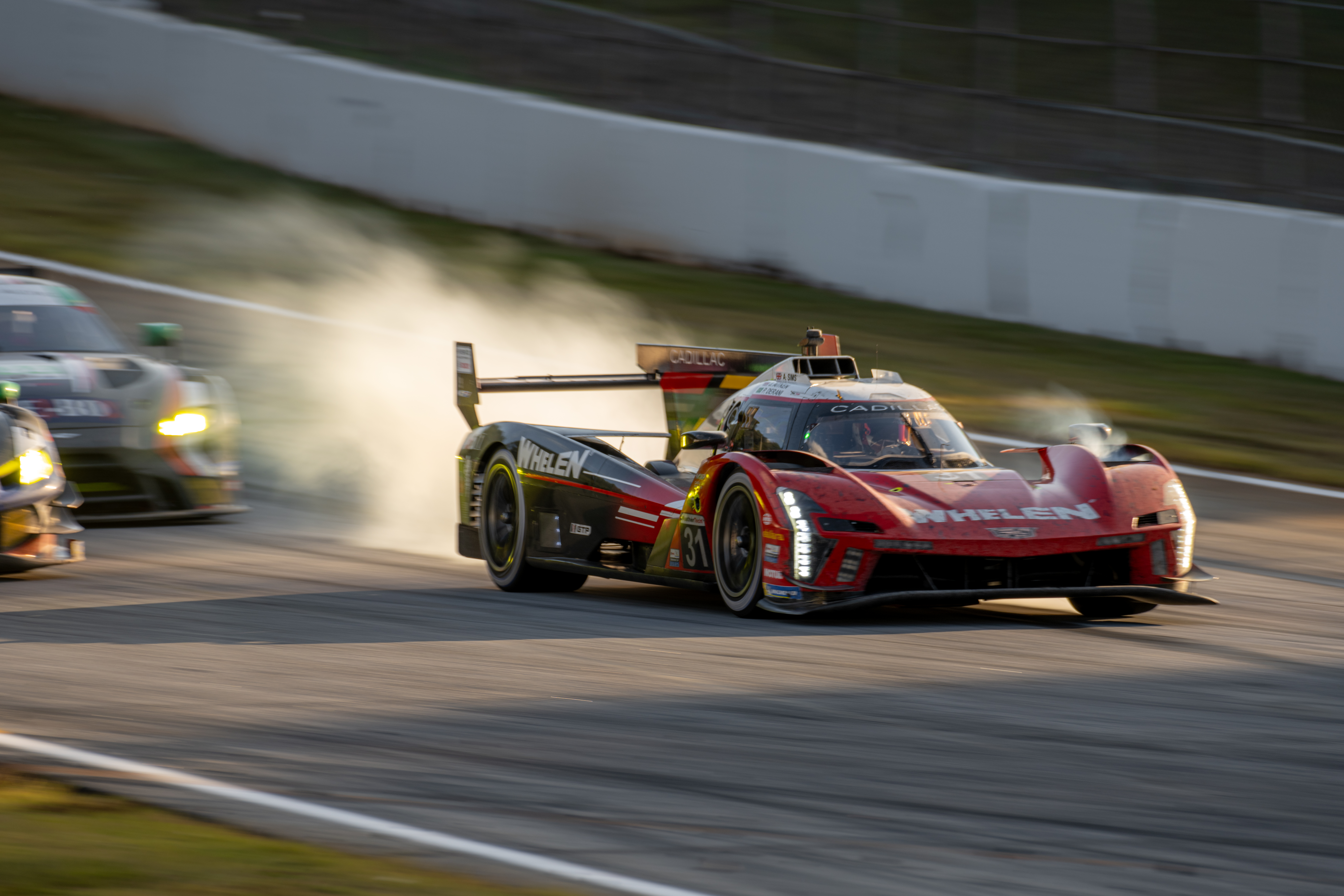
Action Express' V-Series.R during the 2023 Petit Le Mans

For 2019, the Pipo Derani joins the team in the No. 31 from Extreme Speed Motorsports, filling a void left by Eric Curran's move to endurance driver role. Additionally, Christian Fittipaldi will leave the driver's seat as he finishes his transition to a management role following the 2019 Rolex 24 at Daytona.

In 2021, 7-time NASCAR Cup Series champion Jimmie Johnson joined the team in a brand new entry, the No. 48 Ally Cadillac Racing Cadillac DPi-V.R. Simon Pagenaud, Kamui Kobayashi and Mike Rockenfeller joined Johnson in the car, which finished 2nd at the Rolex 24 at Daytona. Johnson's former Hendrick teammate and defending NASCAR champion Chase Elliott joined the #31 Whelen Engineering Cadillac DPi-V.R team during the Rolex 24 at Daytona as well.

== Racing results ==
=== Rolex Sports Car Series ===
Year	Chassis	Engine	No.	Class	Drivers	1	2	3	4	5	6	7	8	9	10	11	12	13	Pos.	Pts.
2010						DAY	HOM	BAR	VIR	LIM	WGI	MOH	DAY	NJMP	WGI	CGV	MMP			
2010	Riley Mk. XX	Porsche 5.0L V8	9	DP	João Barbosa; Terry Borcheller	1	15	10	12	4	10	10	10	11	10	10	12		12th	260
2011						DAY	HOM	BAR	VIR	LIM	WGI	ROA	LAG	NJMP	WGI	CGV	MOH			
2011	Riley Mk. XX	Porsche 5.0L V8	5	DP	David Donohue; Darren Law	9	2	5	3	5	5	6	6	6	6	3	5		3rd	318
2011	Riley Mk. XX	Porsche 5.0L V8	9	DP	João Barbosa; J.C. France	3	5	7	1	6	7	7	8	5	7	6	4		5th	314
2012						DAY	BAR	HOM	NJMP	DET	MOH	ROA	WGI	IMS	WGI	CGV	LAG	LIM		
2012	Corvette DP	Chevrolet 5.5L V8	5	DP	David Donohue	5	9	3	4	2	3	4	7	8	6	3	9	4	4th	348
2012	Corvette DP	Chevrolet 5.5L V8	5	DP	Darren Law	5	9	3	4										3rd	355
2012	Corvette DP	Chevrolet 5.5L V8	9	DP	Darren Law					1	6	6	1	5	8	4	5	5	3rd	355
2012	Corvette DP	Chevrolet 5.5L V8	9	DP	João Barbosa	9	7	8	7	1	6	6	1	5	8	4	5	5	7th	342

=== IMSA SportsCar Championship ===
Year	Entrant	No.	Class	Chassis	Engine	Drivers	1	2	3	4	5	6	7	8	9	10	11	Pos.	Pts.
2014							DAY	SEB	LBH	LGA	BEL	WGL	MOS	IMS	ELK	AUS	ATL		
2014	(United States) Action Express Racing	5	P	Coyote Corvette DP	Chevrolet 5.5L V8	João Barbosa; Christian Fittipaldi	1	3	3	4	6	3	4	1	1	3	2	1st	349
2014	(United States) Action Express Racing	5	P	Coyote Corvette DP	Chevrolet 5.5L V8	Burt Frisselle							4					17th	154
2014	(United States) Action Express Racing	9	P	Coyote Corvette DP	Chevrolet 5.5L V8	Burt Frisselle	3	8				4					10	17th	154
2014	(United States) Action Express Racing	9	P	Coyote Corvette DP	Chevrolet 5.5L V8	Brian Frisselle	3	8				4					10	22nd	106
2015							DAY	SEB	LBH	LGA	BEL	WGL	MOS	ELK	AUS	ATL			
2015	(United States) Action Express Racing	5	P	Coyote Corvette DP	Chevrolet 5.5L V8	João Barbosa; Christian Fittipaldi	2	1	5	4	3	3	5	2	6	1		1st	309
2015	(United States) Action Express Racing	31	P	Coyote Corvette DP	Chevrolet 5.5L V8	Dane Cameron; Eric Curran	4	5	4	5	1	4	2	1	5	3		3rd	304
2016							DAY	SEB	LBH	LGA	BEL	WGL	MOS	ELK	AUS	ATL			
2016	(United States) Action Express Racing	5	P	Coyote Corvette DP	Chevrolet 5.5L V8	João Barbosa; Christian Fittipaldi	4	3	2	7	2	1	2	2	3	5		2nd	311
2016	(United States) Action Express Racing	31	P	Coyote Corvette DP	Chevrolet 5.5L V8	Dane Cameron; Eric Curran	6	2	3	3	6	2	1	1	2	4		1st	314
2017							DAY	SEB	LBH	AUS	BEL	WGL	MOS	ELK	LGA	ATL			
2017	(United States) Mustang Sampling Racing	5	DPi	Cadillac DPi-V.R	Cadillac 6.2L V8	João Barbosa; Christian Fittipaldi	2	2	7	3	4	1	6	6	5	5		3rd	284
2017	(United States) Whelen Engineering Racing	31	DPi	Cadillac DPi-V.R	Cadillac 6.2L V8	Dane Cameron; Eric Curran	6	3	8	2	2	10	1	4	2	2		2nd	291
2018							DAY	SEB	LBH	MOH	BEL	WGL	MOS	ELK	LGA	ATL			
2018	(United States) Mustang Sampling Racing	5	DPi	Cadillac DPi-V.R	Cadillac 6.2L V8	Filipe Albuquerque	1	10	1	4	6	6	4	7	DNS	4		6th	249
2018	(United States) Mustang Sampling Racing	5	DPi	Cadillac DPi-V.R	Cadillac 6.2L V8	João Barbosa	1	10	1	4	6			7	DNS			18th	128
2018	(United States) Mustang Sampling Racing	5	DPi	Cadillac DPi-V.R	Cadillac 6.2L V8	Christian Fittipaldi	1	10				6	4			4		19th	137
2018	(United States) Whelen Engineering Racing	31	DPi	Cadillac DPi-V.R	Cadillac 6.2L V8	Eric Curran; Felipe Nasr	2	3	7	8	1	7	3	3	5	8		1st	227
2019							DAY	SEB	LBH	MOH	BEL	WGL	MOS	ELK	LGA	ATL			
2019	(United States) Mustang Sampling Racing	5	DPi	Cadillac DPi-V.R	Cadillac 6.2L V8	João Barbosa; Christian Fittipaldi	7	3	1	8	6	6	10	6	5	7		7th	258
2019	(United States) Whelen Engineering Racing	31	DPi	Cadillac DPi-V.R	Cadillac 6.2L V8	Dane Cameron; Eric Curran	2	1	6	4	2	7	4	4	3	1		2nd	297
2020							DAY1	DAY2	SEB1	ELK	ATL1	MOH	ATL2	LGA	SEB2				
2020	(United States) Whelen Engineering Racing	31	DPi	Cadillac DPi-V.R	Cadillac 6.2L V8	Pipo Derani; Felipe Nasr; Filipe Albuquerque; Mike Conway; Gabby Chaves	7	5	1	3	3	2	5	3	6			4th	258
2021							DAY		SEB	MOH	BEL	WGL1	WGL2	ELK	LGA	LBH	ATL		
2021							Q	R	SEB	MOH	BEL	WGL1	WGL2	ELK	LGA	LBH	ATL		
2021	(United States) Whelen Engineering Racing	31	DPi	Cadillac DPi-V.R	Cadillac 6.2L V8	Pipo Derani; Felipe Nasr; Mike Conway; Chase Elliott	1	6	6	2	2	4	1	1	3	1	2	1st	3407
2021	(United States) Ally Cadillac Racing	48	DPi	Cadillac DPi-V.R	Cadillac 6.2L V8	Jimmie Johnson; Kamui Kobayashi; Simon Pagenaud; Mike Rockenfeller	6	2	7			5					4	7th	1203
2022							DAY		SEB	LBH	LGA	MOH	BEL	WGL	MOS	ELK	ATL		
2022							Q	R	SEB	LBH	LGA	MOH	BEL	WGL	MOS	ELK	ATL		
2022	(United States) Whelen Engineering Racing	31	DPi	Cadillac DPi-V.R	Cadillac 6.2L V8	Pipo Derani; Tristan Nunez; Olivier Pla; Mike Conway	7	4	3	5	3	3	6	5	3	6	2	5th	3083
2022	(United States) Ally Cadillac Racing	48	DPi	Cadillac DPi-V.R	Cadillac 6.2L V8	Kamui Kobayashi; Mike Rockenfeller; José María López; Jimmie Johnson	3	5	6					6			3	7th	1165
2023							DAY	SEB	LBH	MON	WGL	MOS	ELK	IMS	PET				
2023	(United States) Whelen Engineering Racing	31	GTP	Cadillac V-Series.R	Cadillac LMC55R 5.5 L V8	Alexander Sims; Pipo Derani; Jack Aitken	5	1	5	3	2	7	6	4	6			1st	2733
2024							DAY	SEB	LBH	LGA	DET	WGL	ELK	IMS	ATL				
2024	(United States) Whelen Cadillac Racing	31	GTP	Cadillac V-Series.R	Cadillac LMC55R 5.5 L V8	Jack Aitken; Pipo Derani; Tom Blomqvist	2	10	2	2	6	8	4	9	5			4th	2392
2025							DAY	SEB	LBH	LGA	DET	WGL	ELK	IMS	ATL				
2025	(United States) Whelen Cadillac Racing	31	GTP	Cadillac V-Series.R	Cadillac LMC55R 5.5 L V8	Jack Aitken; Earl Bamber; Felipe Drugovich; Frederik Vesti	9	4	4	6	10	5	4	1	1			2nd	2720
2026*							DAY	SEB	LBH	LGA	DET	WGL	ELK	IMS	ATL				
2026*	(United States) Cadillac Whelen	31	GTP	Cadillac V-Series.R	Cadillac LMC55R 5.5 L V8	Jack Aitken; Earl Bamber; Frederik Vesti; Connor Zilisch	2	3	2	2	1	1						1st	2145

=== 24 Hours of Le Mans ===
Year	Entrant	No.	Car	Drivers	Class	Laps	Pos.	Class Pos.
2023	(United States) Action Express Racing	311	Cadillac V-Series.R	(United Kingdom) Jack Aitken (Brazil) Pipo Derani (United Kingdom) Alexander Sims	Hypercar	324	17th	10th
2024	(United States) Whelen Cadillac Racing	311	Cadillac V-Series.R	(United Kingdom) Jack Aitken (Brazil) Pipo Derani (Brazil) Felipe Drugovich	Hypercar	280	29th	15th
2025	(United States) Cadillac Whelen	311	Cadillac V-Series.R	(United Kingdom) Jack Aitken (Brazil) Felipe Drugovich (Denmark) Frederik Vesti	Hypercar	247	DNF	DNF

== Race wins ==
=== Rolex Sports Car Series wins ===
#	Season	Date	Class	Track / Race	No.	Winning drivers	Chassis	Engine
1	2010	January 30–31	DP	Daytona	9	João Barbosa / Terry Borcheller / Ryan Dalziel / Mike Rockenfeller	Riley Mk. XX	Porsche 5.0L V8
2	2011	May 14	DP	Virginia	9	João Barbosa / Terry Borcheller / J.C. France	Riley Mk. XX	Porsche 5.0L V8
3	2012	June 2	DP	Belle Isle	9	João Barbosa / Darren Law / J.C. France	Corvette DP	Chevrolet 5.0L V8
4	2012	July 1	DP	Watkins Glen	9	João Barbosa / Darren Law	Corvette DP	Chevrolet 5.0L V8

=== WeatherTech SportsCar Championship wins ===
#	Season	Date	Classes	Track / Race	No.	Winning drivers	Chassis	Engine
1	2014	January 25–26	Prototype	Daytona	5	João Barbosa / Sébastien Bourdais / Christian Fittipaldi	Coyote Corvette DP	Chevrolet 5.5L V8
2	2014	July 25	Prototype	Indianapolis	5	João Barbosa / Christian Fittipaldi	Coyote Corvette DP	Chevrolet 5.5L V8
3	2014	August 10	Prototype	Road America	5	João Barbosa / Christian Fittipaldi	Coyote Corvette DP	Chevrolet 5.5L V8
4	2015	March 21	Prototype	Sebring	5	João Barbosa / Sébastien Bourdais / Christian Fittipaldi	Coyote Corvette DP	Chevrolet 5.5L V8
5	2015	May 30	Prototype	Belle Isle	31	Dane Cameron / Eric Curran	Coyote Corvette DP	Chevrolet 5.5L V8
6	2015	August 9	Prototype	Road America	31	Dane Cameron / Eric Curran	Coyote Corvette DP	Chevrolet 5.5L V8
7	2015	October 3	Prototype	Road Atlanta	5	João Barbosa / Sébastien Bourdais / Christian Fittipaldi	Coyote Corvette DP	Chevrolet 5.5L V8
8	2016	July 3	Prototype	Watkins Glen	5	Filipe Albuquerque / João Barbosa / Christian Fittipaldi	Coyote Corvette DP	Chevrolet 5.5L V8
9	2016	July 10	Prototype	Mosport	31	Dane Cameron / Eric Curran	Coyote Corvette DP	Chevrolet 5.5L V8
10	2016	August 7	Prototype	Road America	31	Dane Cameron / Eric Curran	Coyote Corvette DP	Chevrolet 5.5L V8
11	2017	July 2	Prototype	Watkins Glen	5	Filipe Albuquerque / João Barbosa / Christian Fittipaldi	Cadillac DPi-V.R	Cadillac 6.2 L V8
12	2017	July 9	Prototype	Mosport	31	Dane Cameron / Eric Curran	Cadillac DPi-V.R	Cadillac 6.2 L V8
13	2018	January 27–28	Prototype	Daytona	5	Filipe Albuquerque / João Barbosa / Christian Fittipaldi	Cadillac DPi-V.R	Cadillac 5.5 L V8
14	2018	April 14	Prototype	Long Beach	5	Filipe Albuquerque / João Barbosa	Cadillac DPi-V.R	Cadillac 5.5 L V8
15	2018	June 2	Prototype	Belle Isle	31	Eric Curran / Felipe Nasr	Cadillac DPi-V.R	Cadillac 5.5 L V8
16	2019	March 16	DPi	Sebring	31	Eric Curran / Pipo Derani / Felipe Nasr	Cadillac DPi-V.R	Cadillac 5.5 L V8
17	2019	April 13	DPi	Long Beach	5	Filipe Albuquerque / João Barbosa	Cadillac DPi-V.R	Cadillac 5.5 L V8
18	2019	October 12	DPi	Road Atlanta	31	Eric Curran / Pipo Derani / Felipe Nasr	Cadillac DPi-V.R	Cadillac 5.5 L V8
19	2020	July 18	DPi	Sebring	31	Pipo Derani / Felipe Nasr	Cadillac DPi-V.R	Cadillac 5.5 L V8
-	2021	January 24	DPi	Daytona (Qualifying Race)	31	Pipo Derani / Felipe Nasr	Cadillac DPi-V.R	Cadillac 5.5 L V8
20	2023	March 18	GTP	Sebring	31	Jack Aitken / Pipo Derani / Alexander Sims	Cadillac V-Series.R	Cadillac LMC55R 5.5 L V8
21	2025	September 21	GTP	Indianapolis	31	Jack Aitken / Earl Bamber / Frederik Vesti	Cadillac V-Series.R	Cadillac LMC55R 5.5 L V8
22	2025	October 11	GTP	Road Atlanta	31	Jack Aitken / Earl Bamber / Frederik Vesti	Cadillac V-Series.R	Cadillac LMC55R 5.5 L V8
23	2026	May 30	GTP	Detroit	31	Jack Aitken / Earl Bamber	Cadillac V-Series.R	Cadillac LMC55R 5.5 L V8
24	2026	June 28	GTP	Watkins Glen	31	Jack Aitken / Earl Bamber / Frederik Vesti	Cadillac V-Series.R	Cadillac LMC55R 5.5 L V8
