= Doug Harrington =

American racing driver

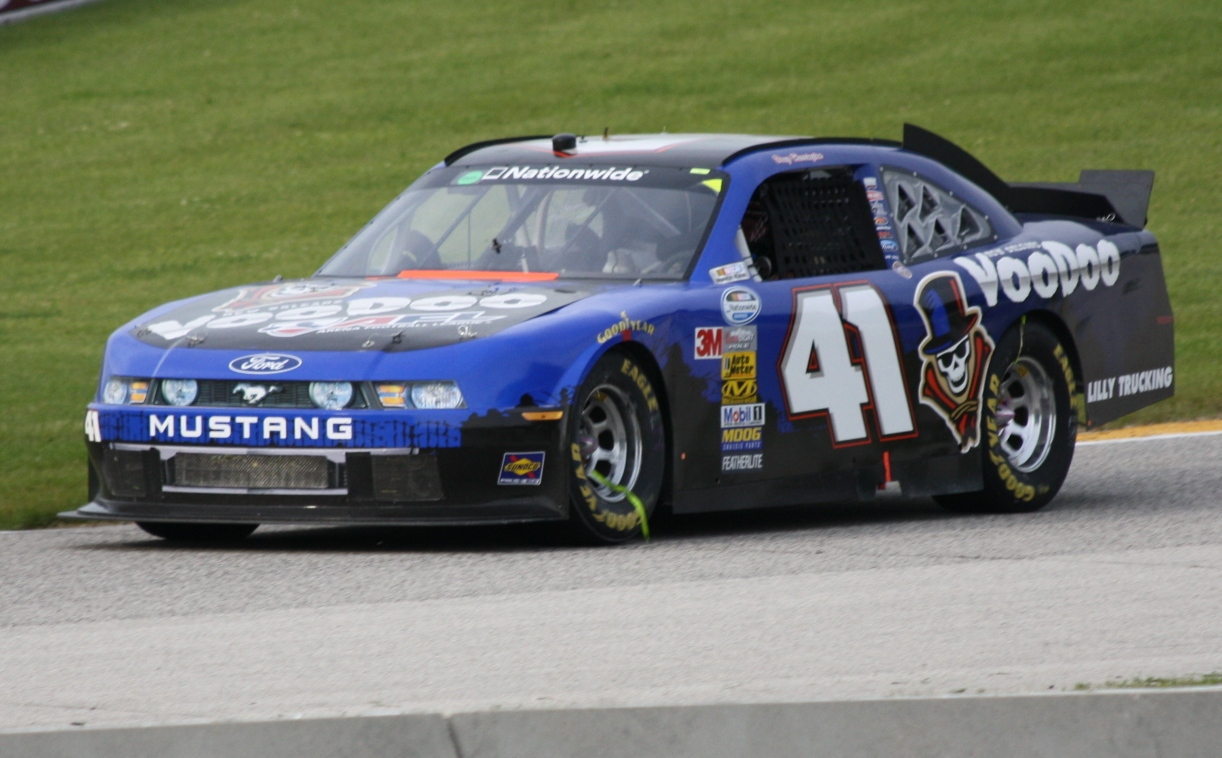
- Harrington's car at Road America in 2011
- Born: Douglas Harrington; November 21, 1964 (age 61); Kemah, Texas, U.S.

NASCAR O'Reilly Auto Parts Series career
- 1 race run over 1 year
- 2011 position: 76th
- Best finish: 76th (2011)
- First race: 2011 Bucyrus 200 (Road America)
Wins	Top tens	Poles
0	0	0

Douglas Harrington (born November 21, 1964) is an American former professional racing driver. He has raced in the NASCAR Nationwide Series and the Rolex 24, both for Rick Ware Racing.

== Motorsports career results ==
=== NASCAR ===
(key) (Bold – Pole position awarded by qualifying time. Italics – Pole position earned by points standings or practice time. * – Most laps led.)

==== Nationwide Series ====
NASCAR Nationwide Series results
Year	Team	No.	Make	1	2	3	4	5	6	7	8	9	10	11	12	13	14	15	16	17	18	19	20	21	22	23	24	25	26	27	28	29	30	31	32	33	34	NNSC	Pts	Ref
2011	Rick Ware Racing	41	Ford	DAY	PHO	LVS	BRI	CAL	TEX	TAL	NSH	RCH	DAR	DOV	IOW	CLT	CHI	MCH	ROA; 30	DAY	KEN	NHA	NSH	IRP	IOW	GLN	CGV	BRI	ATL	RCH	CHI	DOV	KAN	CLT	TEX	PHO	HOM	76th	30	

^{*} Season still in progress
^{1} Ineligible for series points

=== 24 Hours of Daytona ===
(key)

24 Hours of Daytona results
Year	Class	No	Team	Car	Co-drivers	Laps	Position	Class Pos.
2011	GT	47	(United States) Rick Ware Racing	Porsche GT3 Cup	(United States) Jeffrey Earnhardt (United States) Scott Monroe (United States) Maurice Hull (United States) Brett Sandberg	635	25	11
2012	GT	15	(United States) Rick Ware Racing	Ford Mustang	(United States) Chris Cook (United States) Jeffrey Earnhardt (United States) Timmy Hill (United States) John Ware	256	51 ^{DNF}	38 ^{DNF}
