= Ricky Taylor =

British-born American racing driver (born 1989)

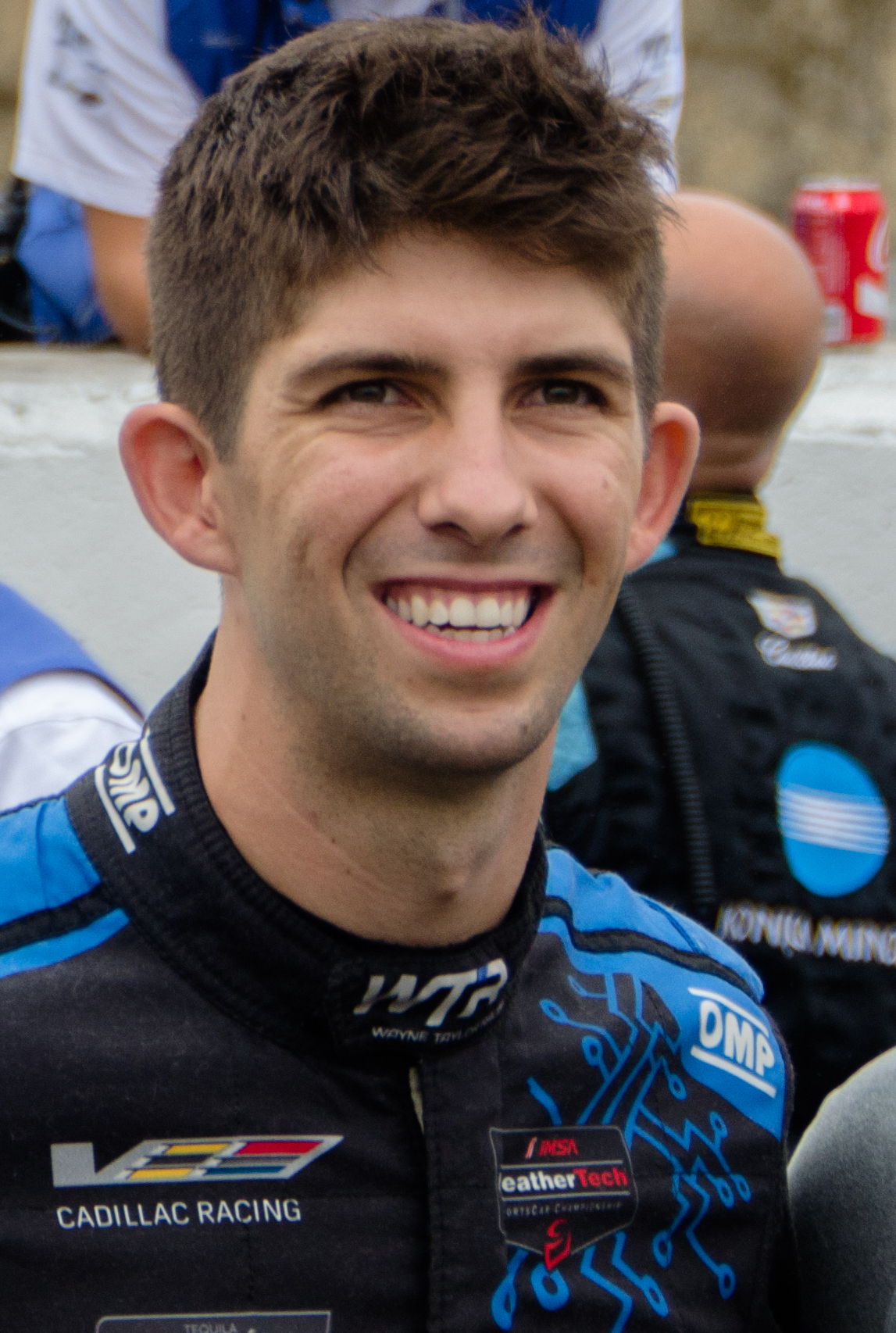
- Taylor at the 2017 Petit Le Mans
- Nationality: (United States) American; (United Kingdom) British; (South Africa) South African; via to triple nationality
- Born: Ricky Scott Taylor; August 3, 1989 (age 37) Surrey, England
- Relatives: Jordan Taylor (brother); Wayne Taylor (father)

IMSA SportsCar Championship career
- Debut season: 2014
- Current team: Cadillac Wayne Taylor Racing
- Categorisation: FIA Gold (until 2019); FIA Platinum (2020–)
- Car number: 10
- Engine: Cadillac LMC55R
- Co-driver: Filipe Albuquerque; Alexander Rossi
- Former teams: Acura Team Penske, Bryan Herta Autosport with PR1/Mathiasen
- Starts: 127
- Championships: 2
- Wins: 26
- Podiums: 58
- Poles: 25
- Best finish: 1st in: 2017; 2020

Ricky Scott Taylor (born August 3, 1989) is an American professional racing driver, most notably in the IMSA WeatherTech SportsCar Championship. His career highlights include an IMSA Series Championship in 2017, as well as marquee wins at the Daytona 24, 12 Hours of Sebring and Petit Le Mans.

In 2017, he, along with his brother Jordan, won the 2017 WeatherTech SportsCar Championship in the Prototype class with five wins.

In 2018, Taylor left his father's team, Wayne Taylor Racing, to join the new Acura Team Penske Prototype squad in 2018 WeatherTech SportsCar Championship, partnering with Hélio Castroneves for the full season. In 2020, he and codriver Castroneves won the 2020 WeatherTech SportsCar Championship. He returned to his father's team in 2021.

Taylor was also runner-up in the Grand-Am Rolex Sports Car Series Daytona Prototype class in 2010 and 2011. Within that category, he earned seven wins and 20 podiums. He was also second in the 2014 24 Hours of Daytona and fifth in 2008, 2011, and 2013.

== Early years ==
Ricky Scott Taylor was born on August 3, 1989, in Surrey to Wayne Taylor, a South African professional racing driver who competed in the IMSA GT Championship in the 1990s. Ricky and his brother, Jordan, grew up in Orlando, Florida. After competing in karting, Ricky won the Skip Barber Southern School single-seater series championship in 2006 and was the Skip Barber National runner-up in 2007.

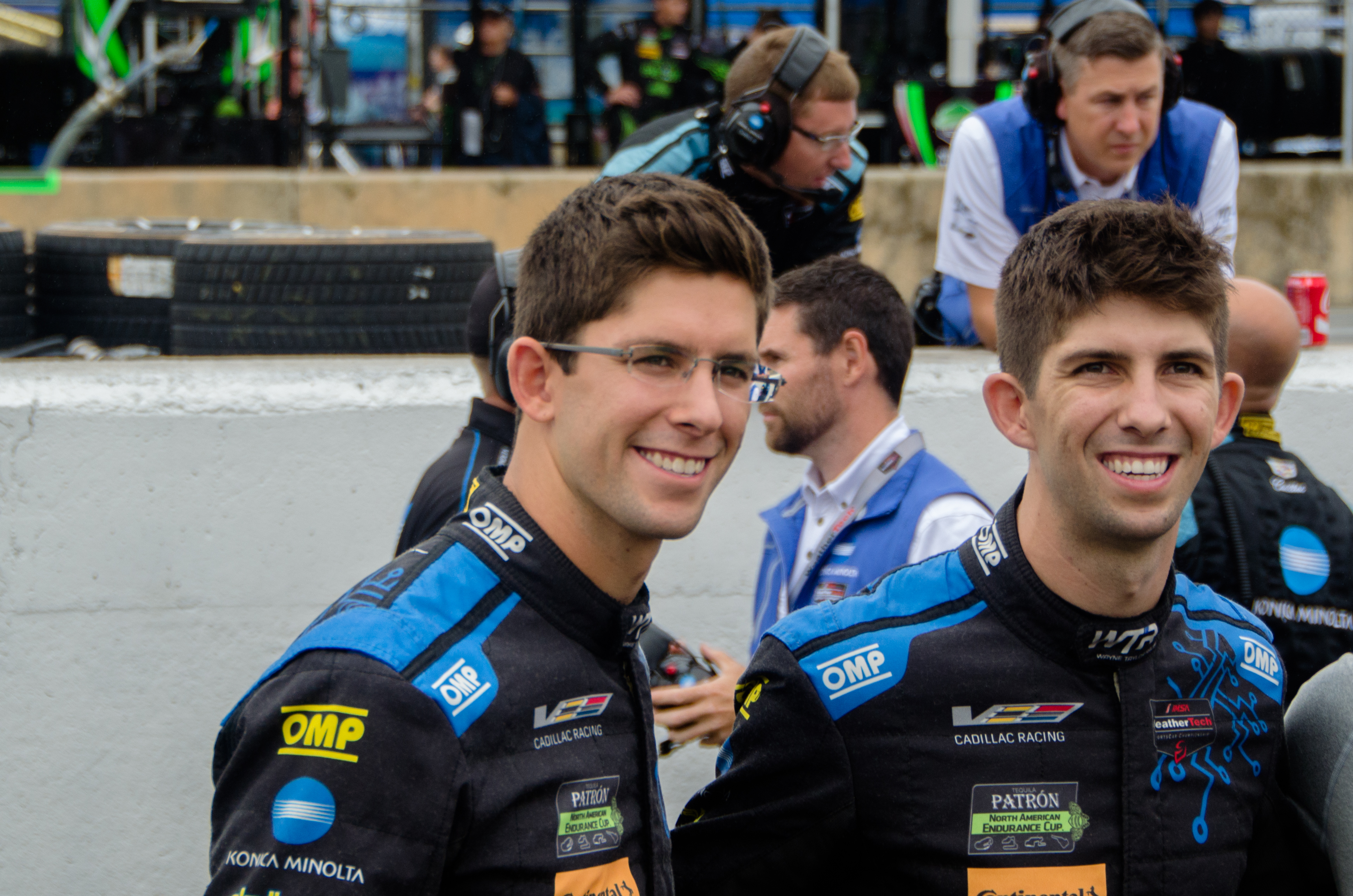
Taylor (right) with brother Jordan at the 2017 Petit Le Mans

In 2008, Taylor debuted in the 24 Hours of Daytona for the Grand-Am series with a Riley-Pontiac in the Daytona Prototype class for Wayne Taylor Racing, resulting fifth with Max Angelelli, Michael Valiante, and his father Wayne Taylor. Months later, contested the Virginia round with the Beyer team, accompanied by Andy Wallace and Jared Beyer. Later, Taylor joined Doran's team to participate in the final six races of the season with a Dallara-Ford, earning a fifth-place finish with Burt Frisselle.

Taylor became a regular driver for Beyer in the 2009 season of the Grand-Am series, using first a Riley-Pontiac and then a Riley-Chevrolet. He earned a fourth, an eighth, and a ninth-place finish in the last three races to finish 18th in the drivers' championship in the Daytona Prototype class.

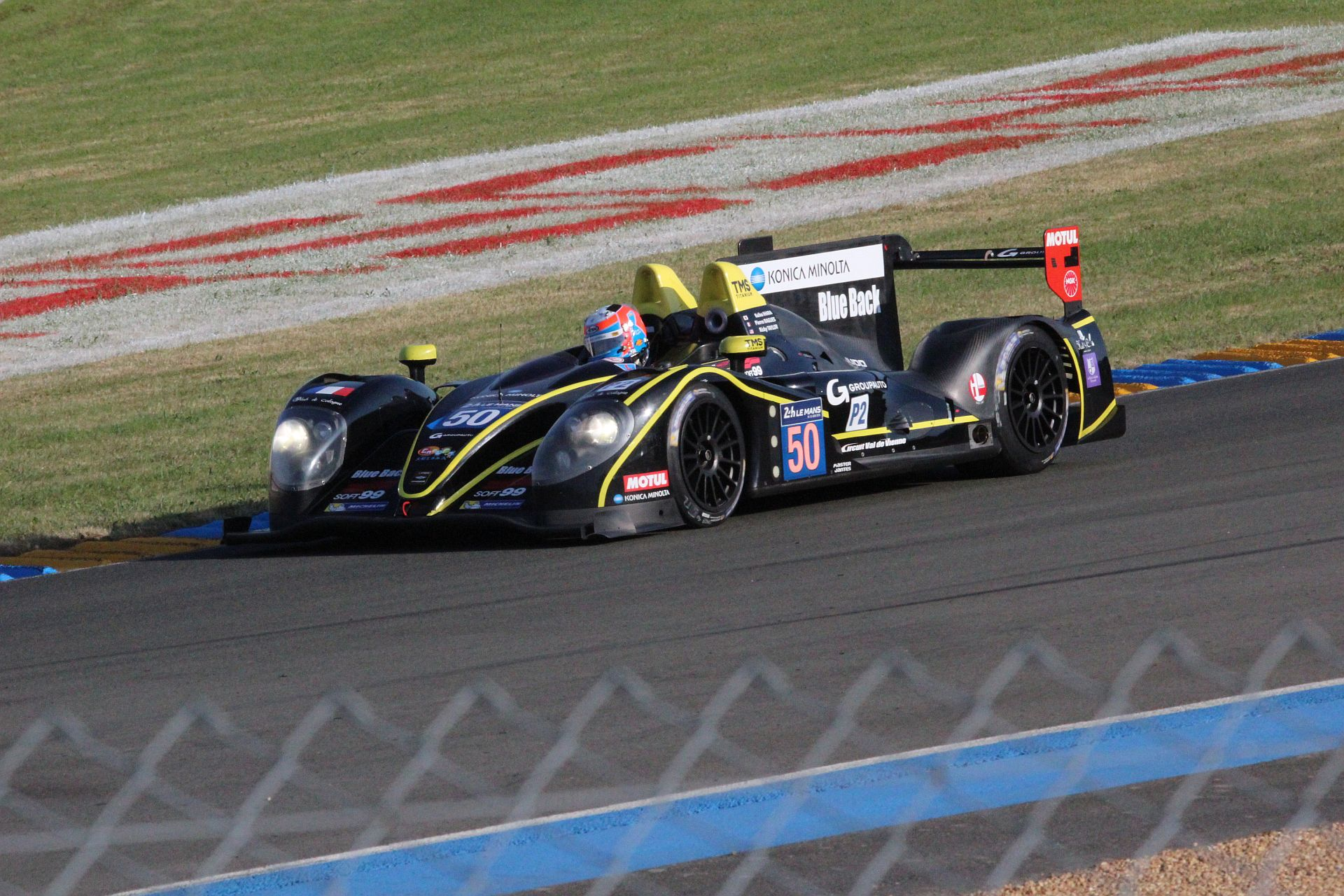
Taylor driving at the 2014 24 Hours of Le Mans, his first in an LMP2 car.

== WTR and Spirit of Daytona ==
Wayne Taylor hired Ricky to contest the 2010 Rolex Sports Car Series with a Dallara-Ford. Accompanied by Max Angelelli, he captured one win and seven podiums and sixth place in the 24 Hours of Daytona. He finished second in the drivers' championships and teams in the DP class, behind Scott Pruett and Memo Rojas and his nine victories.

In the 2011 Rolex Sports Car Series season, Taylor was behind the wheel of a Dallara-Chevrolet. He scored three victories (one of them in the 6 Hours of Watkins Glen) and eight podium finishes, and a fifth place in the 24 Hours of Daytona. As a result, he finished as runner-up in the DP class behind Pruett and Rojas again.

Adopting new Chevrolet Corvette DP in 2012, Taylor recorded three wins and seven top-fives in 12 appearances. He finished seventh in the driver standings and fifth among the teams in the DP class. Later, he contested the Gold Coast 600 of V8 Supercars in a Holden Commodore from Garry Rogers Motorsport alongside Greg Ritter; however, he had a frightening rollover several hundred metres after the start whilst trying to avoid two stricken cars.

Taylor became a driver in the Spirit of Daytona Racing for the 2013 Rolex Sports Car Series season, teaming with Richard Westbrook. He earned a third place, three fifths, and a sixth, finishing 11th in the drivers championship and eighth among teams in the DP. He also obtained a fifth place in the GTE-Am class at the 24 Hours of Le Mans, driving a Chevrolet Corvette in the Larbre Competition.

Taylor competing at the 2022 24 Hours of Le Mans for Cool Racing.

== Team Penske ==
Beginning with the 2018 Roar Before the 24, Taylor partnered with Hélio Castroneves in one of two new Acura ARX-05s fielded by Roger Penske. Taylor and Castroneves won the 2020 WeatherTech SportsCar DPi Drivers' Championship, after finishing eighth at the season finale at the 12 Hours of Sebring.

== Other competition ==
In 2012, Taylor was selected by Garry Rogers Motorsport to participate in the 2012 Armor All Gold Coast 600 event for V8 Supercars as an "international" co-driver. In his first-ever standing start, he managed only 200m before he rolled over a car that had stalled on the grid, totalling his No. 33 Holden VE Commodore and resigning himself and team-mate Greg Ritter to the sidelines for the rest of the weekend.

== Racing record ==
=== Career summary ===
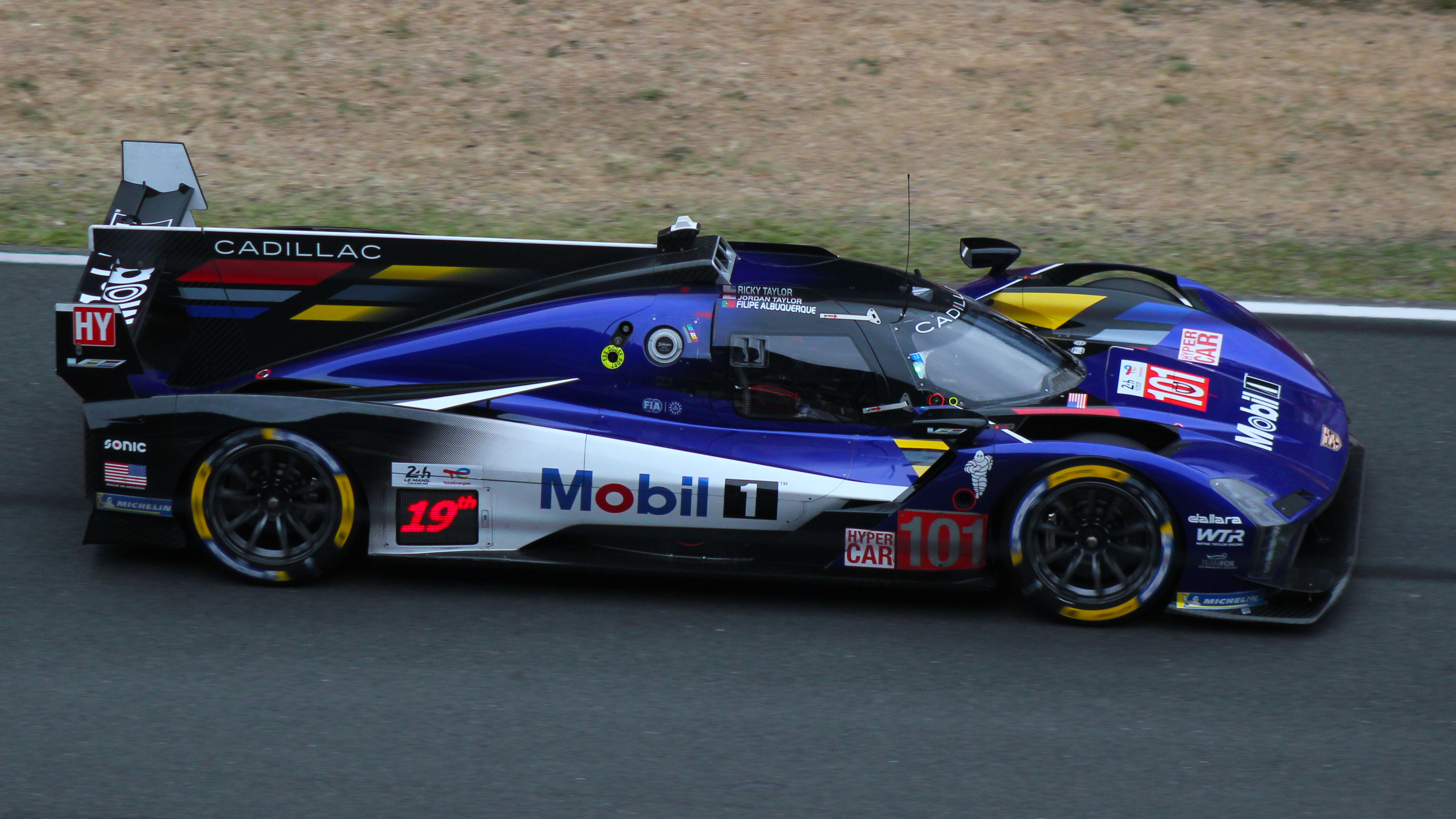
Taylor's No. 101 car at the 2025 24 Hours of Le Mans

Season	Series	Team	Races	Wins	Poles	F/Laps	Podiums	Points	Position
2008	Rolex Sports Car Series - DP	SunTrust Racing	1	0	0	0	0	173	25th
2008	Rolex Sports Car Series - DP	Beyer Racing	1	0	0	0	0	173	25th
2008	Rolex Sports Car Series - DP	Doran Racing	6	0	0	0	0	173	25th
2009	Rolex Sports Car Series - DP	Beyer Racing	12	0	0	0	0	248	11th
2010	Rolex Sports Car Series - DP	SunTrust Racing	12	1	2	0	7	332	**2nd**
2011	Rolex Sports Car Series - DP	SunTrust Racing	12	3	6	2	8	353	**2nd**
2012	Rolex Sports Car Series - DP	SunTrust Racing	13	3	2	0	4	343	6th
2013	Rolex Sports Car Series - DP	Spirit of Daytona Racing	12	0	0	0	1	279	7th
2013	FIA World Endurance Championship - LMGTE Am	Larbre Compétition	1	0	0	0	0	24	20th
2013	24 Hours of Le Mans - LMGTE Am	Larbre Compétition	1	0	0	0	0	N/A	6th
2014	United Sports Car Championship - Prototype	Wayne Taylor Racing	11	2	0	0	6	330	**2nd**
2014	24 Hours of Le Mans - LMP2	Larbre Compétition	1	0	0	0	0	N/A	9th
2014	FIA World Endurance Championship - LMGTE Pro	Corvette Racing	1	0	0	0	0	N/A	NC
2015	United Sports Car Championship - Prototype	Wayne Taylor Racing	10	2	2	0	5	292	5th
2016	IMSA SportsCar Championship - Prototype	Wayne Taylor Racing	10	3			7	309	**3rd**
2016	FIA World Endurance Championship - LMGTE Am	Larbre Compétition	5	0	0	1	1	43	10th
2016	24 Hours of Le Mans - LMGTE Pro	Corvette Racing – GM	1	0	0	0	0	N/A	7th
2017	IMSA SportsCar Championship - Prototype	Wayne Taylor Racing	10	5	5	0	7	310	**1st**
2017	24 Hours of Le Mans - LMP2	Keating Motorsport	1	0	0	0	0	N/A	20th
2017	SprintX GT Championship Series - GT	Cadillac Racing	10	0	1	0	2	149	5th
2017	Pirelli World Challenge - GT	Cadillac Racing	10	0	1	0	2	149	17th
2018	IMSA SportsCar Championship - Prototype	Acura Team Penske	10	1	0	0	2	243	7th
2018	24 Hours of Le Mans - LMP2	Jackie Chan DC Racing	1	0	0	0	0	N/A	DNF
2018-19	FIA World Endurance Championship - LMP2	Jackie Chan DC Racing	1	0	0	0	0	0	23rd
2019	IMSA SportsCar Championship - DPi	Acura Team Penske	10	0	1	0	5	284	**3rd**
2019	24 Hours of Le Mans - LMP2	Jackie Chan DC Racing	1	0	0	0	0	N/A	DNF
2020	IMSA SportsCar Championship - DPi	Acura Team Penske	9	4	2	1	5	265	**1st**
2021	IMSA SportsCar Championship - DPi	Konica Minolta Acura	10	3	2	0	7	3396	**2nd**
2021	European Le Mans Series - LMP2	DragonSpeed USA	1	0	0	0	0	0	36th
2021	FIA World Endurance Championship - LMP2	High Class Racing	1	0	0	0	0	8	24th
2021	24 Hours of Le Mans - LMP2	High Class Racing	1	0	0	0	0	N/A	8th
2022	IMSA SportsCar Championship - DPi	Konica Minolta Acura	10	4	2	0	5	3346	**2nd**
2022	24 Hours of Le Mans - LMP2	Cool Racing	1	0	0	0	0	N/A	7th
2023	IMSA SportsCar Championship - GTP	Wayne Taylor Racing with Andretti Autosport	9	0	0	0	3	2712	**2nd**
2023	24 Hours of Le Mans - LMP2	Tower Motorsports	1	0	0	0	0	N/A	DNF
2024	IMSA SportsCar Championship - GTP	Taylor Racing with Andretti	9	1	0	1	2	2550	6th
2025	IMSA SportsCar Championship - GTP	Cadillac Wayne Taylor Racing	9	0	0	0	3	2626	6th
2025	24 Hours of Le Mans - Hypercar	Cadillac WTR	1	0	0	0	0	N/A	DNF
2026	IMSA SportsCar Championship - GTP	Cadillac Wayne Taylor Racing	9	1	0	0	1	2448	11th
2026	IMSA SportsCar Championship - LMP2	Bryan Herta Autosport with PR1/Mathiasen	1	0	0	0	0	312	34th
2026	24 Hours of Le Mans - Hypercar	Cadillac WTR	1	0	0	0	0	N/A	9th
2026	FIA World Endurance Championship - Hypercar	Cadillac Hertz Team Jota	1	0	0	0	0	2	27th

=== Complete Rolex Sports Car Series results ===
(key) (Races in bold indicate pole position) (Races in italics indicate fastest lap)

Year	Team	Class	Make	Engine	1	2	3	4	5	6	7	8	9	10	11	12	13	14	Rank	Points	Ref
2008	SunTrust Racing	DP	Riley MkXI	Pontiac 5.0 L V8	DAY; 5	MIA	MEX												25th	173	
2008	Beyer Racing	DP	Crawford DP03	Ford 5.0 L V8				VIR; 4	LGA	WGL									25th	173	
2008	Doran Racing	DP	Dallara DP01	Ford 5.0 L V8							LEX; 7	DAY; 11	BAR; 5	MON; 9	WGL; 17	SON; 10	NJ	MIL	25th	173	
2009	Beyer Racing	DP	Riley MkXI	Pontiac/Chevrolet 5.0 L V8	R24; 10	VIR; 14	NJ; 10	LAG; 14	S6H; 10	LEX; 12	DAY; 12	BAR; 12	WGI; 10	MON; 4	MIL; 8	HOM; 9			11th	248	
2010	SunTrust Racing	DP	Dallara DP08	Ford 5.0 L V8	R24; 6	HOM; 6	**BIR**; **12**	VIR; 3	LRP; 1	S6H; 2	LEX; 9	**DAY**; **9**	NJ; 3	WAT; 2	MON; 3	SLK; 3			2nd	332	
2011	SunTrust Racing	DP	Dallara Corvette DP	Chevrolet 5.5 L V8	R24; 5	HOM; 3	BIR; 11	VIR; 4	**LIM**; **1**	**S6H**; **1**	**ELK**; **3**	**LAG**; **3**	**NJ**; **2**	**WAT**; **1**	MON; 2	LEX; 11			2nd	353	
2012	SunTrust Racing	DP	Dallara Corvette DP	Chevrolet 5.0 L V8	R24; 14	BIR; 5	HOM; 1	**NJ**; **1**	BEL; 20	LEX; 9	ELK; 7	S6H; 11	IMS; 3	**WAT**; **4**	MON; 5	LGA; 7	LIM; 1		6th	343	
2013	Spirit of Daytona Racing	DP	Coyote Corvette DP	Chevrolet 5.0 L V8	R24; 5	TXS; 11	BIR; 3	ATL; 5	BEL; 5	LEX; 9	S6H; 9	IMS; 6	ELK; 13	KAN; 12	LGA; 8	LIM; 9			7th	279	

=== Complete 24 Hours of Le Mans results ===
Year	Team	Co-drivers	Car	Class	Laps	Pos.	Class pos.
2013	(France) Larbre Compétition	(France) Julien Canal (France) Patrick Bornhauser	Chevrolet Corvette C6.R	GTE; Am	302	29th	5th
2014	(France) Larbre Compétition	(France) Pierre Ragues (Japan) Keiko Ihara	Morgan LMP2-Judd	LMP2	341	14th	9th
2016	(United States) Corvette Racing - GM	(Spain) Antonio García (Denmark) Jan Magnussen	Chevrolet Corvette C7.R	GTE; Pro	336	25th	7th
2017	(United States) Keating Motorsport	(United States) Ben Keating (Netherlands) Jeroen Bleekemolen	Riley Mk. 30-Gibson	LMP2	312	47th	20th
2018	(China) Jackie Chan DC Racing	(France) Côme Ledogar (Denmark) David Heinemeier Hansson	Ligier JS P217-Gibson	LMP2	195	DNF	DNF
2019	(China) Jackie Chan DC Racing	(United Kingdom) Jordan King (Denmark) David Heinemeier Hansson	Oreca 07-Gibson	LMP2	199	DNF	DNF
2021	(Denmark) High Class Racing	(Denmark) Dennis Andersen (Denmark) Marco Sørensen	Oreca 07-Gibson	LMP2	353	18th	13th
2021	(Denmark) High Class Racing	(Denmark) Dennis Andersen (Denmark) Marco Sørensen	Oreca 07-Gibson	LMP2 Pro-Am	353	18th	4th
2022	(Switzerland) Cool Racing	(Germany) Niklas Krütten (China) Yifei Ye	Oreca 07-Gibson	LMP2	367	11th	7th
2023	(Canada) Tower Motorsports	(Germany) René Rast (United States) Steven Thomas	Oreca 07-Gibson	LMP2	19	DNF	DNF
2023	(Canada) Tower Motorsports	(Germany) René Rast (United States) Steven Thomas	Oreca 07-Gibson	LMP2 Pro-Am	19	DNF	DNF
2025	(United States) Cadillac WTR	(Portugal) Filipe Albuquerque (United States) Jordan Taylor	Cadillac V-Series.R	Hypercar	189	DNF	DNF
2026	(United States) Cadillac WTR	(Portugal) Filipe Albuquerque (United States) Jordan Taylor	Cadillac V-Series.R	Hypercar	379	9th	9th

=== Complete IMSA SportsCar Championship results ===
(key) (Races in bold indicate pole position)

Year	Entrant	Class	Car	Engine	1	2	3	4	5	6	7	8	9	10	11	Rank	Points	Ref
2014	Wayne Taylor Racing	P	Dallara Corvette DP	Chevrolet 5.5 L V8	DAY; 2	SEB; 7	LBH; 2	LGA; 2	DET; 1	WGL; 5	MOS; 3	IMS; 4	ELK; 10	COA; 7	PET; 1	2nd	330	
2015	Wayne Taylor Racing	P	Dallara Corvette DP	Chevrolet 5.5 L V8	DAY; 16	SEB; 2	**LBH**; 1	LGA; 2	DET; 6	WGL; 6	**MOS**; 1	ELK; 8	COA; 2	PET; 4		5th	292	
2016	Wayne Taylor Racing	P	Dallara Corvette DP	Chevrolet 5.5 L V8	DAY; 2	SEB; 12	LBH; 1	LGA; 6	DET; 1	WGL; 4	MOS; 3	ELK; 3	**COA**; 1	PET; 3		3rd	309	
2017	Wayne Taylor Racing	P	Cadillac DPi-V.R	Cadillac LT4 6.2 L V8	DAY; 1	SEB; 1	**LBH**; 1	**COA**; 1	DET; 1	WGL; 6	**MOS**; 7	**ELK**; 2	**LGA**; 3	PET; 9		1st	310	
2018	Acura Team Penske	P	Acura ARX-05	Acura AR35TT 3.5 L Turbo V6	DAY; 9	SEB; 15	LBH; 6	**MOH**; 1	DET; 2	WGL; 12	MOS; 5	ELK; 10	LGA; 10	PET; 5		7th	243	
2019	Acura Team Penske	DPi	Acura ARX-05	Acura AR35TT 3.5 L Turbo V6	DAY; 3	SEB; 4	**LBH**; 2	MOH; 5	DET; 3	WGL; 5	MOS; 5	ELK; 7	**LGA**; 2	PET; 3		3rd	284	
2020	Acura Team Penske	DPi	Acura ARX-05	Acura AR35TT 3.5 L Turbo V6	DAY; 8	DAY; 8	SEB; 7	**ELK**; 1	**ATL**; 1	MOH; 1	PET; 2	LGA; 1	**SEB**; 8			1st	265	
2021	Konica Minolta Acura	DPi	Acura ARX-05	Acura AR35TT 3.5 L Turbo V6	DAY; 1	SEB; 4	MOH; 1	DET; 3	**WGL**; 3	**WGL**; 3	ELK; 4	**LGA**; 1	LBH; 4	PET; 3		2nd	3396	
2022	Konica Minolta Acura	DPi	Acura ARX-05	Acura AR35TT 3.5 L Turbo V6	**DAY**; 2	SEB; 4	LBH; 6	**LGA**; 1	MOH; 1	DET; 4	WGL; 1	MOS; 6	**ELK**; 1	PET; 6		2nd	3346	
2023	Wayne Taylor Racing with Andretti Autosport	GTP	Acura ARX-06	Acura AR24e 2.4 L Turbo V6	DAY; 2	SEB; 4	**LBH**; 7	LGA; 4	WGL; 6	MOS; 2	ELK; 3	IMS; 5	**PET**; 9			2nd	2712	
2024	Wayne Taylor Racing with Andretti	GTP	Acura ARX-06	Acura AR24e 2.4 L Turbo V6	DAY; 9	SEB; 5	LBH; 8	LGA; 6	DET; 1	WGL; 10	**ELK**; 3	IMS; 4	PET; 9			6th	2550	
2025	Cadillac Wayne Taylor Racing	GTP	Cadillac V-Series.R	Cadillac LMC55R 5.5 L V8	DAY; 5	SEB; 7	LBH; 6	LGA; 8	DET; 2	WGL; 3	ELK; 8	IMS; 2	PET; 6			6th	2626	
2026	Cadillac Wayne Taylor Racing	GTP	Cadillac V-Series.R	Cadillac LMC55R 5.5 L V8	DAY; 11	SEB; 11	LBH; 10	LGA; 11	DET; 3	WGL; 7		ELK; 1	IMS; 6	PET; 4		11th	2448	
2026	Bryan Herta Autosport with PR1/Mathiasen	LMP2	Oreca 07	Gibson GK428 4.2 L V8							MOS; 4					34th	312	

=== Complete European Le Mans Series results ===
(key) (Races in bold indicate pole position; results in italics indicate fastest lap)

Year	Entrant	Class	Chassis	Engine	1	2	3	4	5	6	Rank	Points
2021	DragonSpeed USA	LMP2	Oreca 07	Gibson GK428 4.2 L V8	CAT; Ret	RBR	LEC	MNZ	SPA	ALG	36th	0

=== Complete FIA World Endurance Championship results ===
(key) (Races in bold indicate pole position) (Races in italics indicate fastest lap)

Year	Entrant	Class	Chassis	Engine	1	2	3	4	5	6	7	8	9	Rank	Points
2013	Larbre Compétition	LMGTE Am	Chevrolet Corvette C6.R	Chevrolet LS5.5R 5.5 L V8	SIL	SPA	LMS; 6	SÃO	COA	FUJ	SHA	BHR		20th	24
2014	Corvette Racing	LMGTE Pro	Chevrolet Corvette C7.R	Chevrolet LT5.5R 5.5 L V8	SIL	SPA	LMS	COA; 12	FUJ	SHA	BHR	SÃO		NC	0
2016	Larbre Compétition	LMGTE Am	Chevrolet Corvette C7.R	Chevrolet LT5.5R 5.5 L V8	SIL	SPA	LMS	NÜR	MEX; Ret	COA; 3	FUJ; 6	SHA; 5	BHR; 5	10th	43
2018-19	Jackie Chan DC Racing	LMP2	Ligier JS P217	Gibson GK428 4.2 L V8	SPA	LMS	SIL	FUJ	SHA	SEB	SPA	LMS; Ret		23rd	0
2021	High Class Racing	LMP2	Oreca 07	Gibson GK428 4.2 L V8	SPA	ALG	MNZ	LMS; 8	BHR	BHR				24th	8
2026	Cadillac Hertz Team Jota	Hypercar	Cadillac V-Series.R	Cadillac LMC55R 5.5 L V8	IMO	SPA	LMS	SÃO	COA; 9	FUJ	CAT	MNZ		27th	2

Sporting positions
Preceded by Dane Cameron; Eric Curran	IMSA SportsCar Championship; Champion; 2017; With: Jordan Taylor	Succeeded by Felipe Nasr; Eric Curran
Preceded by Juan Pablo Montoya; Dane Cameron	IMSA SportsCar Championship; Champion; 2020; With: Hélio Castroneves	Succeeded by Felipe Nasr; Pipo Derani
Preceded by Ryan Briscoe; Renger van der Zande	Michelin Endurance Cup; Champion; 2021; With: Filipe Albuquerque & Alexander Rossi	Succeeded by Tom Blomqvist; Oliver Jarvis
