= 2017 Petit Le Mans =

Sportscar endurance race in Georgia, US

Road Atlanta

The 20th Annual Motul Petit Le Mans was the 2017 edition of the Petit Le Mans automotive endurance race, held on October 4–7, 2017, at the Road Atlanta circuit in Braselton, Georgia, United States. It was the 12th and final race of the 2017 WeatherTech SportsCar Championship, and the fourth Petit Le Mans run since the formation of the WeatherTech SportsCar Championship in 2014.

== Background ==
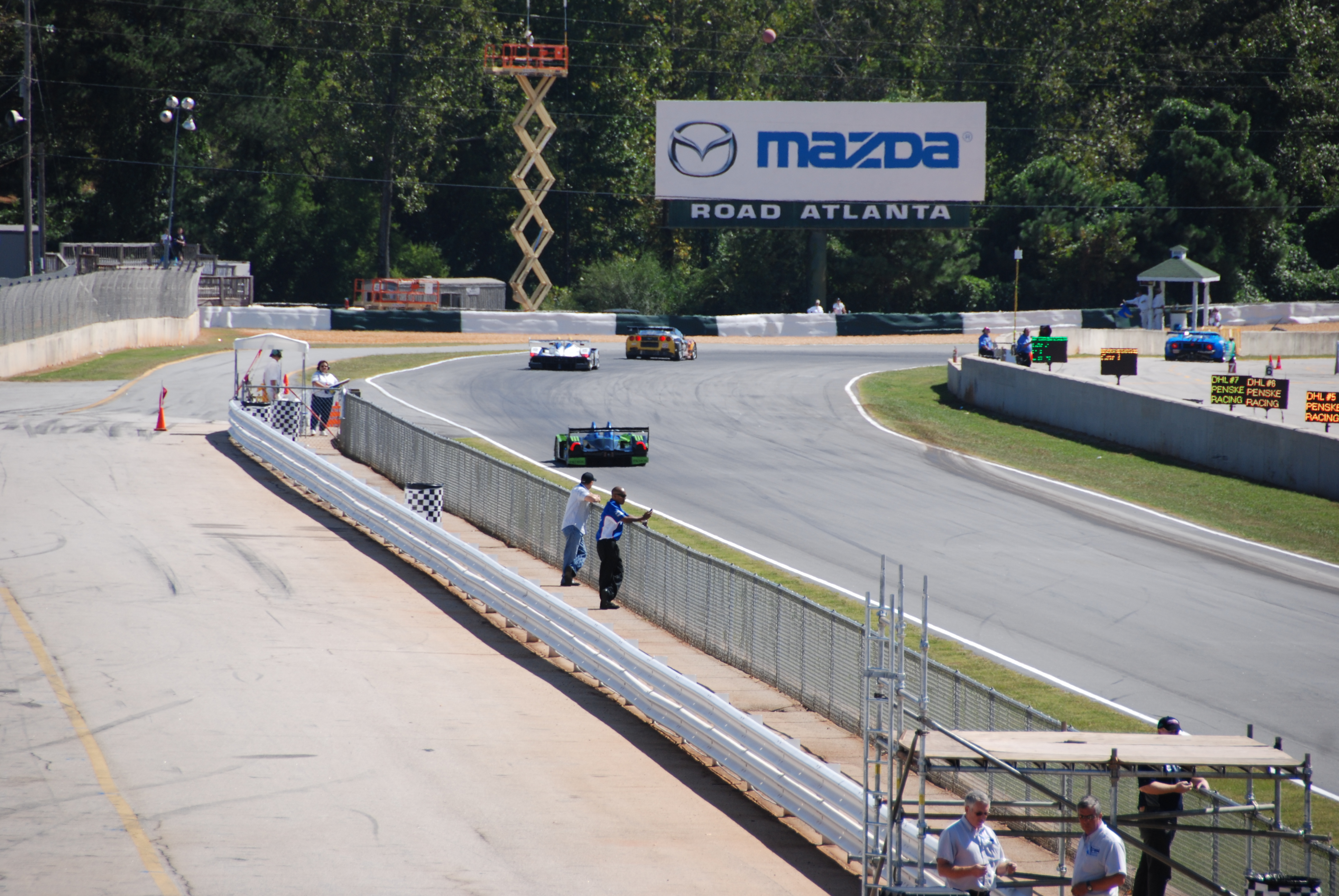
Road Atlanta, where the race was held.

IMSA's president Scott Atherton confirmed Petit Le Mans was part of the series' schedule for the 2017 WeatherTech SportsCar Championship at Road America's victory lane in August 2016. It was the fourth consecutive year the event was held as part of the WeatherTech SportsCar Championship and the 20th annual running of the race. The race was the final of 2017's twelve scheduled IMSA automobile endurance races, and the last of four North American Endurance Cup (NAEC) events. It was held at the 12-turn, 2.540-mile (4.088 km) Road Atlanta in Braselton, Georgia on October 7, 2017. Event creator, Don Panoz served as the grand marshal for the 2017 event.

As the final race of the 2017 season, the race marked the swansong for the PC class. First introduced in 2010, the category ran for eight seasons before a lack of interest lead to IMSA ending the class after the 2017 season.

The BMW M6 GTLM also entered it its final IMSA event, ahead of the switch to new-generation GTE machinery for BMW in 2018. BMW would introduce the M8 GTE as it was based on the upcoming G15 8 Series.

This would be the final race for entry for Alex Job Racing as the team would step back from professional racing and focus on their historic restorations.

Stevenson Motorsports also entered their final race after announcing they would shut down operations following the event.

After the Monterey Grand Prix 1 week earlier, Jordan Taylor and Ricky Taylor led the Prototype Drivers' Championship with 288 points, ahead of Dane Cameron and Eric Curran with 259 points, and João Barbosa and Christian Fittipaldi with 258 points. With 252 points, James French and Patricio O'Ward clinched the PC Drivers' Championship with one race to spare. Antonio García and Jan Magnussen led the GTLM Drivers' Championship with 302 points, ahead of Ryan Briscoe and Richard Westbrook with 283 points. In GTD, the Drivers' Championship was led by Alessandro Balzan and Christina Nielsen with 318 points, ahead of Jeroen Bleekemolen with 292 points. Cadillac, Chevrolet, and Ferrari were leading their respective Manufacturers' Championships, while Wayne Taylor Racing, Performance Tech Motorsports, Corvette Racing, and Scuderia Corsa each led their own Teams' Championships.

== Entries ==
A total of 39 cars took part in the event split across four classes. 10 cars were entered in P, 3 in PC, 9 in GTLM, and 17 in GTD. In P, Team Penske made their IMSA SportsCar Championship debut. Rebellion Racing made their first appearance since the Sebring round. Jonathan Bomarito joined Marc Goossens and Renger van der Zande in the VisitFlorida Racing entry. Brendon Hartley returned to the #2 Tequila Patrón ESM entry. Ryan Hunter-Reay joined Jordan Taylor and Ricky Taylor in the Wayne Taylor Racing entry. Julien Canal joined Olivier Pla and José Gutiérrez in the PR1/Mathiasen Motorsports entry. In PC, John Falb joined Garett Grist and Tomy Drissi and in the #26 BAR1 Motorsports entry. In GTLM, Nick Tandy and Earl Bamber made their first IMSA SportsCar Championship starts since the 2016 Petit Le Mans. Alessandro Pier Guidi replaced James Calado in the Risi Competizione entry. In GTD, Montaplast by Land-Motorsport made their first appearance since Sebring while Alex Job Racing made their first appearance since the Lime Rock round. Michael Christensen and Michael de Quesada returned to the Alegra Motorsports entry. Sheldon van der Linde joined Connor De Phillippi and Christopher Mies in the Montaplast by Land-Motorsport entry. Patrick Long joined Gunnar Jeannette and Cooper MacNeil in the Riley Motorsports - WeatherTech Racing entry. Trent Hindman joined Bryan Sellers and Madison Snow in the Paul Miller Racing entry.

== Practice ==
There were four practice sessions preceding the start of the race on Saturday, three on Thursday and one on Friday. The first two one-hour sessions were on Thursday morning and afternoon. The third held later that evening ran for 90 minutes; the fourth on Friday morning lasted an hour.

=== Practice 1 ===
The first practice session took place at 11:10 am ET on Thursday and ended with Renger van der Zande topping the charts for VisitFlorida Racing, with a lap time of 1:12.650. James French set the fastest time in PC. The GTLM class was topped by the #912 Porsche GT Team Porsche 911 RSR of Laurens Vanthoor with a time of 1:18.320. Jeroen Mul was fastest in GTD.

Pos.	Class	No.	Team	Driver	Time	Gap
1	P	90	VisitFlorida Racing	Renger van der Zande	1:12.650	_
2	P	10	Wayne Taylor Racing	Jordan Taylor	1:12.683	_0.033
3	P	6	Team Penske	Hélio Castroneves	1:12.691	+0.041

=== Practice 2 ===
The second practice session took place at 3:15 pm ET on Thursday and ended with Juan Pablo Montoya topping the charts for Team Penske, with a lap time of 1:12.445. The PC class was topped by the #38 Performance Tech Motorsports Oreca FLM09 of Patricio O'Ward with a time of 1:16.152. Alessandro Pier Guidi was fastest in GTLM while Katherine Legge set the fastest time in GTD.

Pos.	Class	No.	Team	Driver	Time	Gap
1	P	6	Team Penske	Juan Pablo Montoya	1:12.445	_
2	P	13	Rebellion Racing	Mathias Beche	1:12.697	+0.252
3	P	31	Whelen Racing Engineering	Dane Cameron	1:12.759	+0.314

=== Night Practice ===
The night practice session took place at 7:30 pm ET on Thursday and ended with Brendon Hartley topping the charts for Tequila Patrón ESM, with a lap time of 1:12.017. Patricio O'Ward set the fastest time PC by 0.407 seconds ahead of Buddy Rice in the #20 BAR1 Motorsports entry. The GTLM class was topped by the #25 BMW Team RLL BMW M6 GTLM of Alexander Sims with a time of 1:17.818. Nicky Catsburg was second in the sister #24 car and Tommy Milner rounded out the top 3. Jack Hawksworth was fastest in GTD.

Pos.	Class	No.	Team	Driver	Time	Gap
1	P	2	Tequila Patrón ESM	Brendon Hartley	1:12.017	_
2	P	5	Mustang Sampling Racing	Filipe Albuquerque	1:12.327	+0.310
3	P	90	VisitFlorida Racing	Renger van der Zande	1:12.488	+0.471

=== Final Practice ===
The fourth and final practice session took place at 11:40 am ET on Friday and ended with Hélio Castroneves topping the charts for Team Penske, with a lap time of 1:11.968. James French set the fastest time in PC. The GTLM class was topped by the #62 Risi Competizione Ferrari 488 GTE of Toni Vilander with a time of 1:17.497. Connor De Phillippi was fastest in GTD with a time of 1:20.175.

Pos.	Class	No.	Team	Driver	Time	Gap
1	P	6	Team Penske	Hélio Castroneves	1:11.968	_
2	P	2	Tequila Patrón ESM	Brendon Hartley	1:11.991	+0.023
3	P	22	Tequila Patrón ESM	Pipo Derani	1:12.019	+0.051

== Qualifying ==
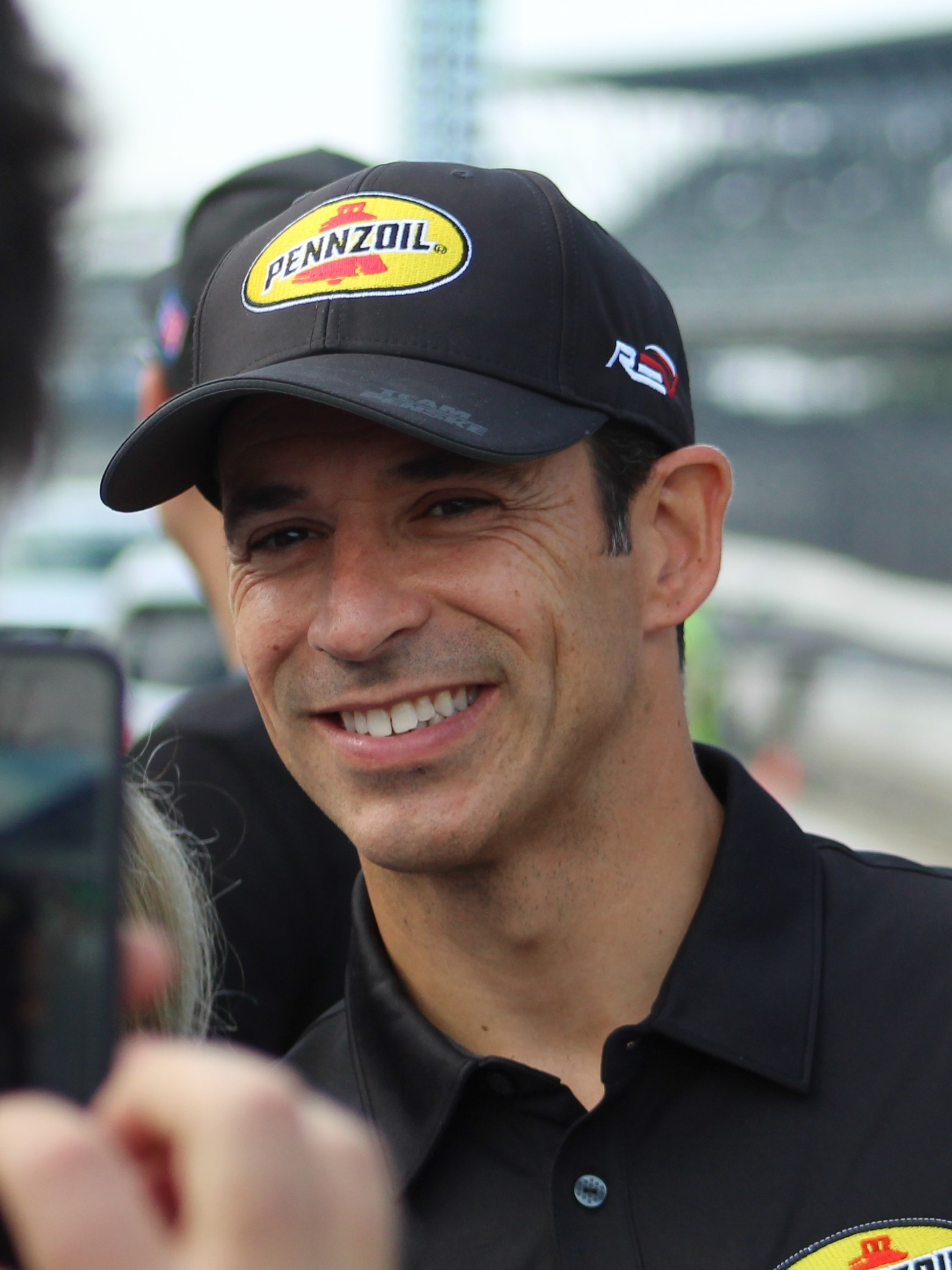
Hélio Castroneves (pictured in 2018) took the overall pole position for Team Penske.

In Friday afternoon's 90-minute four-group qualifying, each category had separate 15-minute sessions. Regulations stipulated that teams nominate one qualifying driver, with the fastest laps determining each class' starting order. IMSA arranged the grid to put Prototypes ahead of the PC, GTLM and GTD cars.

The first was for cars in GTD class. Matteo Cressoni qualified on pole for the class driving the #63 Scuderia Corsa entry, besting Andy Lally in the #93 Michael Shank Racing with Curb-Agajanian entry.

The second session of qualifying was for cars in the GTLM class. Toni Vilander qualified on pole driving the #62 car for Risi Competizione, beating Richard Westbrook in the #67 Ford Chip Ganassi Racing car by less than one tenth of a second.

The third session of qualifying was for cars in the PC class. James French set the fastest time driving the #38 Performance Tech Motorsports entry.

The final session of qualifying was for the P class. Hélio Castroneves qualified on pole driving the #6 car for Team Penske, besting Pipo Derani in the #22 Tequila Patrón ESM entry.

=== Qualifying results ===
Pole positions in each class are indicated in bold and by ‡. All Prototype and Prototype Challenge cars were grouped together on the starting grid, regardless of qualifying position.

Pos	Class	No.	Team	Driver	Time	Gap	Grid
1	**P**	**6**	(United States) **Team Penske**	(Brazil) **Hélio Castroneves**	**1:11.314**	**_**	1‡
2	P	22	(United States) Tequila Patrón ESM	(Brazil) Pipo Derani	1:11.475	+0.161	2
3	P	2	(United States) Tequila Patrón ESM	(New Zealand) Brendon Hartley	1:11.499	+0.185	3
4	P	13	(Switzerland) Rebellion Racing	(Switzerland) Mathias Beche	1:11.623	+0.309	4
5	P	90	(United States) VisitFlorida Racing	(Netherlands) Renger van der Zande	1:11.934	+0.620	5
6	P	52	(United States) PR1/Mathiasen Motorsports	(France) Olivier Pla	1:12.106	+0.792	6
7	P	10	(United States) Wayne Taylor Racing	(United States) Ricky Taylor	1:12.121	+0.807	13^{1}
8	P	85	(United States) JDC-Miller MotorSports	(Canada) Mikhail Goikhberg	1:12.388	+1.074	7
9	P	5	(United States) Mustang Sampling Racing	(Brazil) Christian Fittipaldi	1:12.393	+1.079	8
10	P	31	(United States) Whelen Racing Engineering	(United States) Eric Curran	1:13.051	+1.737	9
11	**PC**	**38**	(United States) **Performance Tech Motorsports**	(United States) **James French**	**1:16.059**	**+4.755**	10‡
12	PC	26	(United States) BAR1 Motorsports	(Canada) Garett Grist	1:17.244	+5.930	11
13	PC	20	(United States) BAR1 Motorsports	(United States) Don Yount	1:17.628	+6.314	12
14	**GTLM**	**62**	(United States) **Risi Competizione**	(Finland) **Toni Vilander**	**1:17.660**	**+6.346**	14‡
15	GTLM	67	(United States) Ford Chip Ganassi Racing	(United Kingdom) Richard Westbrook	1:17.705	+6.391	39^{2}
16	GTLM	3	(United States) Corvette Racing	(Spain) Antonio García	1:17.714	+6.400	15
17	GTLM	66	(United States) Ford Chip Ganassi Racing	(United States) Joey Hand	1:17.729	+6.415	16
18	GTLM	25	(United States) BMW Team RLL	(United States) Bill Auberlen	1:17.731	+6.417	17
19	GTLM	4	(United States) Corvette Racing	(United Kingdom) Oliver Gavin	1:17.823	+6.509	18
20	GTLM	24	(United States) BMW Team RLL	(Germany) Martin Tomczyk	1:18.084	+6.770	19
21	GTLM	912	(United States) Porsche GT Team	(Italy) Gianmaria Bruni	1:18.161	+6.847	20
22	GTLM	911	(United States) Porsche GT Team	(France) Patrick Pilet	1:18.426	+7.112	21
23	**GTD**	**63**	(United States) **Scuderia Corsa**	(Italy) **Matteo Cressoni**	**1:20.661**	**+9.347**	22‡
24	GTD	93	(United States) Michael Shank Racing with Curb-Agajanian	(United States) Andy Lally	1:20.739	+9.425	23
25	GTD	15	(United States) 3GT Racing	(United Kingdom) Jack Hawksworth	1:20.798	+9.484	24
26	GTD	29	(Germany) Montaplast by Land-Motorsport	(South Africa) Sheldon van der Linde	1:20.830	+9.516	25
27	GTD	96	(United States) Turner Motorsport	(Finland) Jesse Krohn	1:20.904	+9.590	26
28	GTD	28	(United States) Alegra Motorsports	(Denmark) Michael Christensen	1:20.968	+9.654	27
29	GTD	86	(United States) Michael Shank Racing with Curb-Agajanian	(Brazil) Oswaldo Negri Jr.	1:20.998	+9.684	28
30	GTD	16	(United States) Change Racing	(Netherlands) Jeroen Mul	1:21.063	+9.749	29
31	GTD	14	(United States) 3GT Racing	(United States) Sage Karam	1:21.115	+9.801	30
32	GTD	57	(United States) Stevenson Motorsports	(United States) Andrew Davis	1:21.220	+9.906	31
33	GTD	48	(United States) Paul Miller Racing	(United States) Madison Snow	1:21.393	+10.079	32
34	GTD	73	(United States) Park Place Motorsports	(United States) Patrick Lindsey	1:21.470	+10.156	33
35	GTD	23	(United States) Alex Job Racing	(United States) Townsend Bell	1:21.648	+10.334	34
36	GTD	75	(United States) SunEnergy1 Racing	(South Africa) Dion von Moltke	1:21.915	+10.601	35
37	GTD	33	(United States) Riley Motorsports - Team AMG	(United States) Ben Keating	1:21.959	+10.645	37^{3}
38	GTD	50	(United States) Riley Motorsports - WeatherTech Racing	(United States) Cooper MacNeil	1:22.177	+10.863	36
39	GTD	54	(United States) CORE Autosport	(United States) Jon Bennett	1:23.379	+12.605	38^{4}
Sources:

- ^{1} The No. 10 Wayne Taylor Racing entry was moved to the back of the P field as per Article 43.6 of the Sporting regulations (Change of starting tires).
- ^{2} The No. 67 Ford Chip Ganassi Racing entry was moved to the back of the GTLM field due to failing post qualifying technical inspection.
- ^{3} The No. 33 Riley Motorsports - Team AMG entry was moved to the back of the GTD field as per Article 43.6 of the Sporting regulations (Change of starting tires).
- ^{4} The No. 54 CORE Autosport entry was moved to the back of the GTD field as per Article 43.6 of the Sporting regulations (Change of starting tires).

== Race ==
=== Post-race ===
Jordan Taylor, and Ricky Taylor took the Prototype Drivers' Championship with 310 points. They were 19 points ahead of Cameron, and Curran in second position. Barbosa and Fittipaldi followed in third place with 291 points, ahead of Goikhberg and Simpson in fourth with 277 points and Ryan Dalziel and Sharp in fifth with 273 points. With 283 points, French and O'Ward won the PC Drivers' Championship, 39 points ahead of Yount in second. García and Magnussen took the GTLM Drivers' Championship with 334 points. They were 17 points ahead of Auberlen and Sims in second position. Hand and Müller followed in third place with 306 points, ahead of Briscoe and Westbrook with 306 points and Pilet and Werner with 295 points. With 340 points, Balzan and Nielsen won the GTD Drivers' Championship, 20 points ahead of Bleekemolen in second. Lindsey was in third position with 298 points and Klingmann was fourth with 294 points. Cadillac, Chevrolet, and Ferrari won their respective Manufactures' Championships while Wayne Taylor Racing, Performance Tech Motorsports, Corvette Racing, and Scuderia Corsa won their respective Teams' Championships.

=== Race result ===
Class winners are denoted in bold and with ‡

Final race classification
Pos	Class	No.	Team	Drivers	Chassis	Tire	Laps	Time/Retired
Pos	Class	No.	Team	Drivers	Engine	Tire	Laps	Time/Retired
1	**P**	**2**	**(United States) Tequila Patrón ESM**	**(United Kingdom) Ryan Dalziel (New Zealand) Brendon Hartley (United States) Scott Sharp**	**Nissan Onroak DPi**	C	**402**	**10:00:22.867‡**
1	**P**	**2**	**(United States) Tequila Patrón ESM**	**(United Kingdom) Ryan Dalziel (New Zealand) Brendon Hartley (United States) Scott Sharp**	**Nissan VR38DETT 3.8 L Twin-turbo V6**	C	**402**	**10:00:22.867‡**
2	P	31	(United States) Whelen Engineering Racing	(United States) Dane Cameron (United Kingdom) Mike Conway (United States) Eric Curran	Cadillac DPi-V.R	C	402	+7.633
2	P	31	(United States) Whelen Engineering Racing	(United States) Dane Cameron (United Kingdom) Mike Conway (United States) Eric Curran	Cadillac 6.2 L V8	C	402	+7.633
3	P	6	(United States) Team Penske	(Brazil) Hélio Castroneves (Colombia) Juan Pablo Montoya (France) Simon Pagenaud	Oreca 07	C	402	+8.058
3	P	6	(United States) Team Penske	(Brazil) Hélio Castroneves (Colombia) Juan Pablo Montoya (France) Simon Pagenaud	Gibson GK428 4.2 L V8	C	402	+8.058
4	P	22	(United States) Tequila Patrón ESM	(Brazil) Pipo Derani (Brazil) Bruno Senna (United States) Johannes van Overbeek	Nissan Onroak DPi	C	402	+19.285
4	P	22	(United States) Tequila Patrón ESM	(Brazil) Pipo Derani (Brazil) Bruno Senna (United States) Johannes van Overbeek	Nissan VR38DETT 3.8 L Twin-turbo V6	C	402	+19.285
5	P	5	(United States) Mustang Sampling Racing	(Portugal) Filipe Albuquerque (Portugal) João Barbosa (Brazil) Christian Fittipaldi	Cadillac DPi-V.R	C	401	+1 Lap
5	P	5	(United States) Mustang Sampling Racing	(Portugal) Filipe Albuquerque (Portugal) João Barbosa (Brazil) Christian Fittipaldi	Cadillac 6.2 L V8	C	401	+1 Lap
6	P	85	(United States) JDC-Miller MotorSports	(Canada) Misha Goikhberg (United States) Chris Miller (South Africa) Stephen Simpson	Oreca 07	C	399	+3 Laps
6	P	85	(United States) JDC-Miller MotorSports	(Canada) Misha Goikhberg (United States) Chris Miller (South Africa) Stephen Simpson	Gibson GK428 4.2 L V8	C	399	+3 Laps
7	**GTLM**	**25**	**(United States) BMW Team RLL**	**(United States) Bill Auberlen (United Kingdom) Alexander Sims (Canada) Kuno Wittmer**	**BMW M6 GTLM**	M	**392**	**+10 Laps‡**
7	**GTLM**	**25**	**(United States) BMW Team RLL**	**(United States) Bill Auberlen (United Kingdom) Alexander Sims (Canada) Kuno Wittmer**	**BMW 4.4 L Turbo V8**	M	**392**	**+10 Laps‡**
8	GTLM	3	(United States) Corvette Racing	(Spain) Antonio García (Denmark) Jan Magnussen (Germany) Mike Rockenfeller	Chevrolet Corvette C7.R	M	392	+10 Laps
8	GTLM	3	(United States) Corvette Racing	(Spain) Antonio García (Denmark) Jan Magnussen (Germany) Mike Rockenfeller	Chevrolet LT5.5 5.5 L V8	M	392	+10 Laps
9	GTLM	62	(United States) Risi Competizione	(Italy) Giancarlo Fisichella (Italy) Alessandro Pier Guidi (Finland) Toni Vilander	Ferrari 488 GTE	M	392	+10 Laps
9	GTLM	62	(United States) Risi Competizione	(Italy) Giancarlo Fisichella (Italy) Alessandro Pier Guidi (Finland) Toni Vilander	Ferrari F154CB 4.0 L Twin-turbo V8	M	392	+10 Laps
10	GTLM	4	(United States) Corvette Racing	(Switzerland) Marcel Fässler (United Kingdom) Oliver Gavin (United States) Tommy Milner	Chevrolet Corvette C7.R	M	392	+10 Laps
10	GTLM	4	(United States) Corvette Racing	(Switzerland) Marcel Fässler (United Kingdom) Oliver Gavin (United States) Tommy Milner	Chevrolet LT5.5 5.5 L V8	M	392	+10 Laps
11	GTLM	912	(United States) Porsche GT Team	(New Zealand) Earl Bamber (Italy) Gianmaria Bruni (Belgium) Laurens Vanthoor	Porsche 911 RSR	M	392	+10 Laps
11	GTLM	912	(United States) Porsche GT Team	(New Zealand) Earl Bamber (Italy) Gianmaria Bruni (Belgium) Laurens Vanthoor	Porsche 4.0 L Flat-6	M	392	+10 Laps
12	GTLM	911	(United States) Porsche GT Team	(France) Patrick Pilet (United Kingdom) Nick Tandy (Germany) Dirk Werner	Porsche 911 RSR	M	392	+10 Laps
12	GTLM	911	(United States) Porsche GT Team	(France) Patrick Pilet (United Kingdom) Nick Tandy (Germany) Dirk Werner	Porsche 4.0 L Flat-6	M	392	+10 Laps
13	GTLM	66	(United States) Ford Chip Ganassi Racing	(France) Sébastien Bourdais (United States) Joey Hand (Germany) Dirk Müller	Ford GT	M	392	+10 Laps
13	GTLM	66	(United States) Ford Chip Ganassi Racing	(France) Sébastien Bourdais (United States) Joey Hand (Germany) Dirk Müller	Ford EcoBoost 3.5 L Twin-turbo V6	M	392	+10 Laps
14	GTLM	67	(United States) Ford Chip Ganassi Racing	(Australia) Ryan Briscoe (New Zealand) Scott Dixon (United Kingdom) Richard Westbrook	Ford GT	M	390	+12 Laps
14	GTLM	67	(United States) Ford Chip Ganassi Racing	(Australia) Ryan Briscoe (New Zealand) Scott Dixon (United Kingdom) Richard Westbrook	Ford EcoBoost 3.5 L Twin-turbo V6	M	390	+12 Laps
15	**PC**	**26**	**(United States) BAR1 Motorsports**	**(United States) Tomy Drissi (United States) John Falb (Canada) Garett Grist**	**Oreca FLM09**	C	**384**	**+18 Laps‡**
15	**PC**	**26**	**(United States) BAR1 Motorsports**	**(United States) Tomy Drissi (United States) John Falb (Canada) Garett Grist**	**Chevrolet 6.2 L V8**	C	**384**	**+18 Laps‡**
16	**GTD**	**29**	**(Germany) Montaplast by Land-Motorsport**	**(United States) Connor De Phillippi (Germany) Christopher Mies (South Africa) Sheldon van der Linde**	**Audi R8 LMS**	C	**382**	**+20 Laps‡**
16	**GTD**	**29**	**(Germany) Montaplast by Land-Motorsport**	**(United States) Connor De Phillippi (Germany) Christopher Mies (South Africa) Sheldon van der Linde**	**Audi 5.2 L V10**	C	**382**	**+20 Laps‡**
17	GTD	28	(United States) Alegra Motorsports	(Denmark) Michael Christensen (Canada) Daniel Morad (United States) Michael de Quesada	Porsche 911 GT3 R	C	382	+20 Laps
17	GTD	28	(United States) Alegra Motorsports	(Denmark) Michael Christensen (Canada) Daniel Morad (United States) Michael de Quesada	Porsche 4.0 L Flat-6	C	382	+20 Laps
18	GTD	73	(United States) Park Place Motorsports	(Germany) Jörg Bergmeister (United States) Patrick Lindsey (United States) Matt McMurry	Porsche 911 GT3 R	C	382	+20 Laps
18	GTD	73	(United States) Park Place Motorsports	(Germany) Jörg Bergmeister (United States) Patrick Lindsey (United States) Matt McMurry	Porsche 4.0 L Flat-6	C	382	+20 Laps
19	GTD	33	(United States) Riley Motorsports - Team AMG	(Netherlands) Jeroen Bleekemolen (Germany) Mario Farnbacher (United States) Ben Keating	Mercedes AMG GT3	C	381	+21 Laps
19	GTD	33	(United States) Riley Motorsports - Team AMG	(Netherlands) Jeroen Bleekemolen (Germany) Mario Farnbacher (United States) Ben Keating	Mercedes AMG M159 6.2 L V8	C	381	+21 Laps
20 DNF	P	90	(United States) Visit Florida Racing	(United States) Jonathan Bomarito (Belgium) Marc Goossens (Netherlands) Renger van der Zande	Ligier JS P217	C	380	Header
20 DNF	P	90	(United States) Visit Florida Racing	(United States) Jonathan Bomarito (Belgium) Marc Goossens (Netherlands) Renger van der Zande	Gibson GK428 4.2 V8	C	380	Header
21	GTD	54	(United States) CORE Autosport	(United States) Jon Bennett (United States) Colin Braun (Sweden) Niclas Jönsson	Porsche 911 GT3 R	C	380	+22 Laps
21	GTD	54	(United States) CORE Autosport	(United States) Jon Bennett (United States) Colin Braun (Sweden) Niclas Jönsson	Porsche 4.0 L Flat-6	C	380	+22 Laps
22	GTD	23	(United States) Alex Job Racing	(United States) Townsend Bell (United States) Frankie Montecalvo (United States) Bill Sweedler	Audi R8 LMS	C	380	+22 Laps
22	GTD	23	(United States) Alex Job Racing	(United States) Townsend Bell (United States) Frankie Montecalvo (United States) Bill Sweedler	Audi 5.2 L V10	C	380	+22 Laps
23	PC	20	(United States) BAR1 Motorsports	(Canada) Daniel Burkett (United States) Buddy Rice (United States) Don Yount	Oreca FLM09	C	376	+26 Laps
23	PC	20	(United States) BAR1 Motorsports	(Canada) Daniel Burkett (United States) Buddy Rice (United States) Don Yount	Chevrolet 6.2 L V8	C	376	+26 Laps
24	GTD	48	(United States) Paul Miller Racing	(United States) Trent Hindman (United States) Bryan Sellers (United States) Madison Snow	Lamborghini Huracán GT3	C	375	+27 Laps
24	GTD	48	(United States) Paul Miller Racing	(United States) Trent Hindman (United States) Bryan Sellers (United States) Madison Snow	Lamborghini 5.2 L V10	C	375	+27 Laps
25	PC	38	(United States) Performance Tech Motorsports	(United States) James French (United States) Kyle Masson (Mexico) Patricio O'Ward	Oreca FLM09	C	367	+35 Laps
25	PC	38	(United States) Performance Tech Motorsports	(United States) James French (United States) Kyle Masson (Mexico) Patricio O'Ward	Chevrolet 6.2 L V8	C	367	+35 Laps
26	GTD	15	(United States) 3GT Racing	(United States) Austin Cindric (United Kingdom) Jack Hawksworth (United States) Scott Pruett	Lexus RC F GT3	C	364	+38 Laps
26	GTD	15	(United States) 3GT Racing	(United States) Austin Cindric (United Kingdom) Jack Hawksworth (United States) Scott Pruett	Lexus 5.4 L V8	C	364	+38 Laps
27	GTD	63	(United States) Scuderia Corsa	(Italy) Alessandro Balzan (Italy) Matteo Cressoni (Denmark) Christina Nielsen	Ferrari 488 GT3	C	349	+53 Laps
27	GTD	63	(United States) Scuderia Corsa	(Italy) Alessandro Balzan (Italy) Matteo Cressoni (Denmark) Christina Nielsen	Ferrari F154CB 3.9 L Twin-turbo V8	C	349	+53 Laps
28 DNF	GTLM	24	(United States) BMW Team RLL	(Netherlands) Nicky Catsburg (United States) John Edwards (Germany) Martin Tomczyk	BMW M6 GTLM	M	338	Cooling
28 DNF	GTLM	24	(United States) BMW Team RLL	(Netherlands) Nicky Catsburg (United States) John Edwards (Germany) Martin Tomczyk	BMW 4.4 L Turbo V8	M	338	Cooling
29 DNF	GTD	14	(United States) 3GT Racing	(United States) Robert Alon (United Kingdom) Ian James (United States) Sage Karam	Lexus RC F GT3	C	308	Crash
29 DNF	GTD	14	(United States) 3GT Racing	(United States) Robert Alon (United Kingdom) Ian James (United States) Sage Karam	Lexus 5.4 L V8	C	308	Crash
30 DNF	GTD	16	(United States) Change Racing	(United States) Corey Lewis (Netherlands) Jeroen Mul (United States) Brett Sandberg	Lamborghini Huracán GT3	C	300	Fuel Pressure
30 DNF	GTD	16	(United States) Change Racing	(United States) Corey Lewis (Netherlands) Jeroen Mul (United States) Brett Sandberg	Lamborghini 5.2 L V10	C	300	Fuel Pressure
31 DNF	GTD	86	(United States) Michael Shank Racing with Curb-Agajanian	(United States) Tom Dyer (Brazil) Oswaldo Negri (United States) Jeff Segal	Acura NSX GT3	C	292	Handling
31 DNF	GTD	86	(United States) Michael Shank Racing with Curb-Agajanian	(United States) Tom Dyer (Brazil) Oswaldo Negri (United States) Jeff Segal	Acura 3.5 L Twin-turbo V6	C	292	Handling
32 DNF	GTD	57	(United States) Stevenson Motorsports	(United States) Lawson Aschenbach (United States) Matt Bell (United States) Andrew Davis	Audi R8 LMS	C	229	Crash
32 DNF	GTD	57	(United States) Stevenson Motorsports	(United States) Lawson Aschenbach (United States) Matt Bell (United States) Andrew Davis	Audi 5.2 L V10	C	229	Crash
33 DNF	GTD	93	(United States) Michael Shank Racing with Curb-Agajanian	(United States) Andy Lally (United Kingdom) Katherine Legge (Canada) Mark Wilkins	Acura NSX GT3	C	219	Crash
33 DNF	GTD	93	(United States) Michael Shank Racing with Curb-Agajanian	(United States) Andy Lally (United Kingdom) Katherine Legge (Canada) Mark Wilkins	Acura 3.5 L Twin-turbo V6	C	219	Crash
34 DNF	GTD	96	(United States) Turner Motorsport	(Germany) Jens Klingmann (Finland) Jesse Krohn (United States) Justin Marks	BMW M6 GT3	C	213	Electrical
34 DNF	GTD	96	(United States) Turner Motorsport	(Germany) Jens Klingmann (Finland) Jesse Krohn (United States) Justin Marks	BMW 4.4 L Twin-turbo V8	C	213	Electrical
35 DNF	GTD	75	(United States) SunEnergy1 Racing	(Australia) Kenny Habul (South Africa) Dion von Moltke (France) Tristan Vautier	Mercedes AMG GT3	C	210	Water Pump
35 DNF	GTD	75	(United States) SunEnergy1 Racing	(Australia) Kenny Habul (South Africa) Dion von Moltke (France) Tristan Vautier	Mercedes AMG M159 6.2 L V8	C	210	Water Pump
36 DNF	P	13	(Switzerland) Rebellion Racing	(Switzerland) Mathias Beche (Germany) Nick Heidfeld (United States) Gustavo Menezes	Oreca 07	C	205	Crash
36 DNF	P	13	(Switzerland) Rebellion Racing	(Switzerland) Mathias Beche (Germany) Nick Heidfeld (United States) Gustavo Menezes	Gibson GK428 4.2 L V8	C	205	Crash
37 DNF	P	10	(United States) Wayne Taylor Racing	(United States) Ryan Hunter-Reay (United States) Jordan Taylor (United States) Ricky Taylor	Cadillac DPi-V.R	C	97	Engine
37 DNF	P	10	(United States) Wayne Taylor Racing	(United States) Ryan Hunter-Reay (United States) Jordan Taylor (United States) Ricky Taylor	Cadillac 6.2 L V8	C	97	Engine
38 DNF	P	52	(United States) PR1/Mathiasen Motorsports	(France) Julien Canal (Mexico) José Gutiérrez (France) Olivier Pla	Ligier JS P217	C	62	Crash
38 DNF	P	52	(United States) PR1/Mathiasen Motorsports	(France) Julien Canal (Mexico) José Gutiérrez (France) Olivier Pla	Gibson GK428 4.2 L V8	C	62	Crash
39 DNF	GTD	50	(United States) Riley Motorsports - WeatherTech Racing	(United States) Gunnar Jeannette (United States) Patrick Long (United States) Cooper MacNeil	Porsche 911 GT3 R	C	15	Gearbox
39 DNF	GTD	50	(United States) Riley Motorsports - WeatherTech Racing	(United States) Gunnar Jeannette (United States) Patrick Long (United States) Cooper MacNeil	Porsche 4.0 L Flat-6	C	15	Gearbox

Tyre manufacturers
Key
Symbol	Tyre manufacturer
**C**	Continental
**M**	Michelin

== Standings after the race ==
Prototype Drivers' Championship standings
Pos.	+/–	Driver	Points
1		(United States) Jordan Taylor (United States) Ricky Taylor	310
2		(United States) Dane Cameron (United States) Eric Curran	291
3		(Portugal) João Barbosa (Brazil) Christian Fittipaldi	284
4		(Canada) Misha Goikhberg (South Africa) Stephen Simpson	277
5		(United Kingdom) Ryan Dalziel (United States) Scott Sharp	273

PC Drivers' Championship standings
Pos.	+/–	Driver	Points
1		(United States) James French (Mexico) Patricio O'Ward	283
2		(United States) Don Yount	244
3		(United States) Buddy Rice	182
4	1	(United States) Kyle Masson	139
5	1	(Colombia) Gustavo Yacamán	121

GTLM Drivers' Championship standings
Pos.	+/–	Driver	Points
1		(Spain) Antonio García (Denmark) Jan Magnussen	334
2	1	(United States) Bill Auberlen (United Kingdom) Alexander Sims	317
3	1	(United States) Joey Hand (Germany) Dirk Müller	306
4	2	(Australia) Ryan Briscoe (United Kingdom) Richard Westbrook	306
5		(France) Patrick Pilet (Germany) Dirk Werner	295

GTD Drivers' Championship standings
Pos.	+/–	Driver	Points
1		(Italy) Alessandro Balzan (Denmark) Christina Nielsen	340
2		(Netherlands) Jeroen Bleekemolen	320
3	2	(United States) Patrick Lindsey	298
4	1	(Germany) Jens Klingmann	294
5	2	(United States) Ben Keating	290

- Note: Only the top five positions are included for all sets of standings.

Prototype Teams' Championship standings
Pos.	+/–	Team	Points
1		(United States) #10 Wayne Taylor Racing	310
2		(United States) #31 Whelen Engineering Racing	291
3		(United States) #5 Mustang Sampling Racing	284
4		(United States) #85 JDC-Miller MotorSports	277
5		(United States) #2 Tequila Patrón ESM	273

PC Teams' Championship standings
Pos.	+/–	Team	Points
1		(United States) #38 Performance Tech Motorsports	283
2		(United States) #26 BAR1 Motorsports	252
3		(United States) #20 BAR1 Motorsports	244
4		(United States) #8 Starworks Motorsport	58
5		(United States) #88 Starworks Motorsport	28

GTLM Teams' Championship standings
Pos.	+/–	Team	Points
1		(United States) #3 Corvette Racing	334
2	1	(United States) #25 BMW Team RLL	317
3	1	(United States) #66 Ford Chip Ganassi Racing	306
4	2	(United States) #67 Ford Chip Ganassi Racing	306
5		(United States) #911 Porsche GT Team	295

GTD Teams' Championship standings
Pos.	+/–	Team	Points
1		(United States) #63 Scuderia Corsa	340
2		(United States) #33 Riley Motorsports Team AMG	320
3	2	(United States) #73 Park Place Motorsports	298
4	1	(United States) #96 Turner Motorsport	294
5	1	(United States) #93 Michael Shank Racing with Curb-Agajanian	286

- Note: Only the top five positions are included for all sets of standings.

Prototype Manufacturers' Championship standings
Pos.	+/–	Manufacturer	Points
1		(United States) Cadillac	344
2		(Japan) Nissan	320
3		(Japan) Mazda	216

GTLM Manufacturers' Championship standings
Pos.	+/–	Manufacturer	Points
1		(United States) Chevrolet	348
2	1	(Germany) BMW	342
3	1	(United States) Ford	338
4		(Germany) Porsche	325
5		(Italy) Ferrari	204

GTD Manufacturers' Championship standings
Pos.	+/–	Manufacturer	Points
1		(Italy) Ferrari	352
2	1	(Germany) Mercedes-AMG	348
3		(Germany) Porsche	345
4		(Japan) Acura	334
5	2	(Germany) Audi	334

- Note: Only the top five positions are included for all sets of standings.
- Note: Bold names include the Drivers', Teams', and Manufactures' Champion respectively.

IMSA SportsCar Championship
Previous race: Monterey Grand Prix	2017 season	Next race: none
