= 2009 Six Hours of Watkins Glen =

Track Map of Watkins Glen International.

The 2009 Sahlen's Six Hours of the Glen was the fifth round of the 2009 Rolex Sports Car Series season. It took place at Watkins Glen International on June 6, 2009.

== Race results ==
Class Winners in bold.

Pos	Class	No	Team	Drivers	Chassis	Laps
Pos	Class	No	Team	Drivers	Engine	Laps
1	**DP**	**01**	**Chip Ganassi Racing with Felix Sabates**	**(United States) Scott Pruett (Mexico) Memo Rojas**	**Riley Mk. XX**	**188**
1	**DP**	**01**	**Chip Ganassi Racing with Felix Sabates**	**(United States) Scott Pruett (Mexico) Memo Rojas**	**Lexus 5.0L V8**	**188**
2	DP	10	SunTrust Racing	(Italy) Max Angelelli (United States) Brian Frisselle (South Africa) Wayne Taylor	Dallara DP01	188
2	DP	10	SunTrust Racing	(Italy) Max Angelelli (United States) Brian Frisselle (South Africa) Wayne Taylor	Ford 5.0L V8	188
3	DP	12	Penske Racing	(Germany) Timo Bernhard (France) Romain Dumas	Riley Mk. XX	188
3	DP	12	Penske Racing	(Germany) Timo Bernhard (France) Romain Dumas	Porsche 3.99L Flat-6	188
4	DP	6	Michael Shank Racing	(United States) John Pew (Canada) Michael Valiante	Riley Mk. XX	188
4	DP	6	Michael Shank Racing	(United States) John Pew (Canada) Michael Valiante	Ford 5.0L V8	188
5	DP	60	Michael Shank Racing	(Brazil) Oswaldo Negri, Jr. (South Africa) Mark Patterson	Riley Mk. XX	188
5	DP	60	Michael Shank Racing	(Brazil) Oswaldo Negri, Jr. (South Africa) Mark Patterson	Ford 5.0L V8	188
6	DP	59	Brumos Racing	(Portugal) João Barbosa (United States) Terry Borcheller (United States) J.C. France (United States) Hurley Haywood	Riley Mk. XI	188
6	DP	59	Brumos Racing	(Portugal) João Barbosa (United States) Terry Borcheller (United States) J.C. France (United States) Hurley Haywood	Porsche 3.99L Flat-6	188
7	DP	55	Supercar Life Racing/Level 5	(France) Christophe Bouchut (United States) Scott Tucker	Riley Mk. XX	186
7	DP	55	Supercar Life Racing/Level 5	(France) Christophe Bouchut (United States) Scott Tucker	BMW 5.0L V8	186
8	DP	45	Orbit Racing	(United States) Bill Auberlen (United States) Bill Lester (United Kingdom) Darren Manning	Riley Mk. XI	186
8	DP	45	Orbit Racing	(United States) Bill Auberlen (United States) Bill Lester (United Kingdom) Darren Manning	BMW 5.0L V8	186
9	DP	76	Krohn Racing	(Sweden) Nic Jönsson (Brazil) Ricardo Zonta	Proto-Auto Lola B08/70	186
9	DP	76	Krohn Racing	(Sweden) Nic Jönsson (Brazil) Ricardo Zonta	Ford 5.0L V8	186
10	DP	13	Beyer Racing	(Canada) Mike Forest (United States) Ricky Taylor (United States) Jordan Taylor	Riley Mk. XI	186
10	DP	13	Beyer Racing	(Canada) Mike Forest (United States) Ricky Taylor (United States) Jordan Taylor	Pontiac 5.0L V8	186
11	DP	61	AIM Autosports	(United States) Burt Frisselle (Brazil) Bruno Junqueira (Canada) Mark Wilkins	Riley Mk. XX	183
11	DP	61	AIM Autosports	(United States) Burt Frisselle (Brazil) Bruno Junqueira (Canada) Mark Wilkins	Ford 5.0L V8	183
12	DP	22	Alegra Motorsports	(United Kingdom) Ryan Dalziel (United Kingdom) Ian James (United States) Carlos de Quesada	Riley Mk. XI	180
12	DP	22	Alegra Motorsports	(United Kingdom) Ryan Dalziel (United Kingdom) Ian James (United States) Carlos de Quesada	BMW 5.0L V8	180
13	DP	91	RVO Motorsports	(United States) Paul Dallenbach (United States) Roger Schramm	Riley Mk. XX	178
13	DP	91	RVO Motorsports	(United States) Paul Dallenbach (United States) Roger Schramm	Pontiac 5.0L V8	178
14	**GT**	**87**	**Farnbacher-Loles Racing**	**(United States) Leh Keen (Germany) Dirk Werner**	**Porsche 997 GT3 Cup**	**178**
14	**GT**	**87**	**Farnbacher-Loles Racing**	**(United States) Leh Keen (Germany) Dirk Werner**	**Porsche 3.6L Flat-6**	**178**
15	GT	07	Team Drinkin' Mate	(United States) Kelly Collins (United States) Paul Edwards	Pontiac GXP.R	178
15	GT	07	Team Drinkin' Mate	(United States) Kelly Collins (United States) Paul Edwards	Pontiac 6.0L V8	178
16	GT	86	Farnbacher-Loles Racing	(Germany) Wolf Henzler (United States) Eric Lux	Porsche 997 GT3 Cup	178
16	GT	86	Farnbacher-Loles Racing	(Germany) Wolf Henzler (United States) Eric Lux	Porsche 3.6L Flat-6	178
17	GT	70	SpeedSource	(United Kingdom) Nick Ham (United States) David Haskell (Canada) Sylvain Tremblay	Mazda RX-8 GT	178
17	GT	70	SpeedSource	(United Kingdom) Nick Ham (United States) David Haskell (Canada) Sylvain Tremblay	Mazda 2.0L 3-Rotor	178
18	GT	66	The Racer's Group	(United States) John Potter (United States) Spencer Pumpelly	Porsche 997 GT3 Cup	178
18	GT	66	The Racer's Group	(United States) John Potter (United States) Spencer Pumpelly	Porsche 3.6L Flat-6	178
19	GT	69	SpeedSource	(United States) Emil Assentato (United States) Nick Longhi (United States) Jeff Segal	Mazda RX-8 GT	178
19	GT	69	SpeedSource	(United States) Emil Assentato (United States) Nick Longhi (United States) Jeff Segal	Mazda 2.0L 3-Rotor	178
20	DP	2	Childress-Howard Motorsports	(United States) Rob Finlay (United Kingdom) Andy Wallace	Crawford DP08	177
20	DP	2	Childress-Howard Motorsports	(United States) Rob Finlay (United Kingdom) Andy Wallace	Pontiac 5.0L V8	177
21	GT	40	Dempsey Racing	(United States) Patrick Dempsey (United States) Charles Espenlaub (United States) Joe Foster	Mazda RX-8 GT	175
21	GT	40	Dempsey Racing	(United States) Patrick Dempsey (United States) Charles Espenlaub (United States) Joe Foster	Mazda 2.0L 3-Rotor	175
22 DNF	GT	57	Stevenson Motorsports	(United States) Andrew Davis (United Kingdom) Robin Liddell	Pontiac GXP.R	174
22 DNF	GT	57	Stevenson Motorsports	(United States) Andrew Davis (United Kingdom) Robin Liddell	Pontiac 6.0L V8	174
23	GT	88	Farnbacher-Loles Racing	(United States) Jack Baldwin (United States) Steve Johnson (Canada) Dave Lacey	Porsche 997 GT3 Cup	173
23	GT	88	Farnbacher-Loles Racing	(United States) Jack Baldwin (United States) Steve Johnson (Canada) Dave Lacey	Porsche 3.6L Flat-6	173
24	GT	42	Team Sahlen	(United States) Will Nonnamaker (United States) Joe Sahlen	Chevrolet Corvette C6	168
24	GT	42	Team Sahlen	(United States) Will Nonnamaker (United States) Joe Sahlen	Chevrolet 5.7L V8	168
25	GT	68	The Racer's Group	(United States) Duncan Ende (Mexico) Josémanuel Gutierrez (United States) Scott Schroeder	Porsche 997 GT3 Cup	168
25	GT	68	The Racer's Group	(United States) Duncan Ende (Mexico) Josémanuel Gutierrez (United States) Scott Schroeder	Porsche 3.6L Flat-6	168
26	DP	58	Brumos Racing	(United States) David Donohue (United States) Darren Law (United States) Buddy Rice	Riley Mk. XI	164
26	DP	58	Brumos Racing	(United States) David Donohue (United States) Darren Law (United States) Buddy Rice	Porsche 3.99L Flat-6	164
27 DNF	GT	71	Synergy Racing	(United States) Carey Grant (United States) Kevin Grant (United States) Milton Grant	Porsche 997 GT3 Cup	156
27 DNF	GT	71	Synergy Racing	(United States) Carey Grant (United States) Kevin Grant (United States) Milton Grant	Porsche 3.6L Flat-6	156
28 DNF	GT	67	The Racer's Group	(United States) Andy Lally (United States) Justin Marks (United States) R.J. Valentine	Porsche 997 GT3 Cup	139
28 DNF	GT	67	The Racer's Group	(United States) Andy Lally (United States) Justin Marks (United States) R.J. Valentine	Porsche 3.6L Flat-6	139
29 DNF	GT	30	Racers Edge Motorsports	(United States) Dane Cameron (United States) Peter Ludwig (United States) Bryce Miller	Mazda RX-8 GT	130
29 DNF	GT	30	Racers Edge Motorsports	(United States) Dane Cameron (United States) Peter Ludwig (United States) Bryce Miller	Mazda 2.0L 3-Rotor	130
30 DNF	DP	99	GAINSCO/Bob Stallings Racing	(United States) Jon Fogarty (United States) Alex Gurney	Riley Mk. XX	121
30 DNF	DP	99	GAINSCO/Bob Stallings Racing	(United States) Jon Fogarty (United States) Alex Gurney	Pontiac 5.0L V8	121
31	GT	21	Battery Tender/MCM Racing	(United States) Matt Connolly (United States) Shane Lewis (United States) Jason Vinkemulder	Pontiac GTO.R	77
31	GT	21	Battery Tender/MCM Racing	(United States) Matt Connolly (United States) Shane Lewis (United States) Jason Vinkemulder	Pontiac 6.0L V8	77
32 DNF	GT	43	Team Sahlen	(United States) Wayne Nonnamaker (United States) Joe Nonnamaker	Chevrolet Corvette C6	73
32 DNF	GT	43	Team Sahlen	(United States) Wayne Nonnamaker (United States) Joe Nonnamaker	Chevrolet 5.7L V8	73
33 DNF	DP	77	Doran Racing	(United States) Memo Gidley (United States) Brad Jaeger	Dallara DP01	24
33 DNF	DP	77	Doran Racing	(United States) Memo Gidley (United States) Brad Jaeger	Ford 5.0L V8	24
34 DNF	DP	09	Spirit of Daytona Racing	(United States) Guy Cosmo (United States) Scott Russell	Coyote CC/08	16
34 DNF	DP	09	Spirit of Daytona Racing	(United States) Guy Cosmo (United States) Scott Russell	Porsche 5.0L V8	16
DNS	DP	20	RVO Motorsports	(United States) Paul Dallenbach (United States) Roger Schramm	Riley Mk. XI	-
DNS	DP	20	RVO Motorsports	(United States) Paul Dallenbach (United States) Roger Schramm	Pontiac 5.0L V8	-
DNS	GT	31	Battery Tender/MCM Racing	(United States) Matt Connolly (South Africa) Dion von Moltke	Porsche 997 GT3 Cup	-
DNS	GT	31	Battery Tender/MCM Racing	(United States) Matt Connolly (South Africa) Dion von Moltke	Porsche 3.6L Flat-6	-

Rolex Sports Car Series
Previous race: Verizon Festival of Speed	2009 season	Next race: EMCO Gears Classic
