= 2008 EMCO Gears Classic =

The layout of Mid-Ohio Sports Car Course

The 2008 EMCO Gears Classic was the eighth round of the 2008 Rolex Sports Car Series season. It took place at Mid-Ohio Sports Car Course on June 22, 2008.

== Race results ==
Class Winners in bold.

| Pos | Class | No | Team | Drivers | Chassis | Laps |
| Pos | Class | No | Team | Drivers | Engine | Laps |
|---|---|---|---|---|---|---|
| 1 | **DP** | **99** | **GAINSCO/Bob Stallings Racing** | **(United States) Jon Fogarty** **(United States) Alex Gurney** | **Riley Mk. XX** | **76** |
| 1 | **DP** | **99** | **GAINSCO/Bob Stallings Racing** | **(United States) Jon Fogarty** **(United States) Alex Gurney** | **Pontiac 5.0L V8** | **76** |
| 2 | DP | 58 | Brumos Racing | (United States) David Donohue (United States) Darren Law | Riley Mk. XI | 76 |
| 2 | DP | 58 | Brumos Racing | (United States) David Donohue (United States) Darren Law | Porsche 3.99L Flat-6 | 76 |
| 3 | DP | 7 | Sigalsport | (United States) Matt Plumb (United States) Gene Sigal | Riley Mk. XI | 76 |
| 3 | DP | 7 | Sigalsport | (United States) Matt Plumb (United States) Gene Sigal | BMW 5.0L V8 | 76 |
| 4 | DP | 61 | AIM Autosport | (United States) Brian Frisselle (Canada) Mark Wilkins | Riley Mk. XI | 76 |
| 4 | DP | 61 | AIM Autosport | (United States) Brian Frisselle (Canada) Mark Wilkins | Ford 5.0L V8 | 76 |
| 5 | DP | 59 | Brumos Racing | (United States) J.C. France (Portugal) Joao Barbosa | Riley Mk. XI | 76 |
| 5 | DP | 59 | Brumos Racing | (United States) J.C. France (Portugal) Joao Barbosa | Porsche 3.99L Flat-6 | 76 |
| 6 | DP | 60 | Michael Shank Racing | (Brazil) Oswaldo Negri Jr. (United States) Mark Patterson | Riley Mk. XI | 76 |
| 6 | DP | 60 | Michael Shank Racing | (Brazil) Oswaldo Negri Jr. (United States) Mark Patterson | Ford 5.0L V8 | 76 |
| 7 | DP | 47 | Doran Racing | (United States) Burt Frisselle (United States) Ricky Taylor | Dallara DP01 | 76 |
| 7 | DP | 47 | Doran Racing | (United States) Burt Frisselle (United States) Ricky Taylor | Ford 5.0L V8 | 76 |
| 8 | DP | 01 | Chip Ganassi Racing | (United States) Scott Pruett (Mexico) Memo Rojas | Riley Mk. XX | 76 |
| 8 | DP | 01 | Chip Ganassi Racing | (United States) Scott Pruett (Mexico) Memo Rojas | Lexus 5.0L V8 | 76 |
| 9 | DP | 76 | Krohn Racing | (Sweden) Nic Jönsson (Brazil) Ricardo Zonta | Proto-Auto Lola B08/70 | 76 |
| 9 | DP | 76 | Krohn Racing | (Sweden) Nic Jönsson (Brazil) Ricardo Zonta | Pontiac 5.0L V8 | 76 |
| 10 | DP | 10 | SunTrust Racing | (Italy) Max Angelelli (Canada) Michael Valiante | Riley Mk. XI | 76 |
| 10 | DP | 10 | SunTrust Racing | (Italy) Max Angelelli (Canada) Michael Valiante | Pontiac 5.0L V8 | 76 |
| 11 | **GT** | **86** | **Farnbacher-Loles Racing** | **(United States) Eric Lux** **(United States) Leh Keen** | **Porsche 997 GT3 Cup** | **76** |
| 11 | **GT** | **86** | **Farnbacher-Loles Racing** | **(United States) Eric Lux** **(United States) Leh Keen** | **Porsche 3.6L Flat-6** | **76** |
| 12 | GT | 57 | Stevenson Motorsports | (Scotland) Robin Liddell (United States) Andrew Davis | Pontiac GXP.R | 75 |
| 12 | GT | 57 | Stevenson Motorsports | (Scotland) Robin Liddell (United States) Andrew Davis | Pontiac 6.0L V8 | 75 |
| 13 | GT | 21 | Matt Connolly Motorsports | (United States) Ryan Phinny (Italy) Diego Alessi | Pontiac GXP.R | 75 |
| 13 | GT | 21 | Matt Connolly Motorsports | (United States) Ryan Phinny (Italy) Diego Alessi | Pontiac 6.0L V8 | 75 |
| 14 | GT | 66 | The Racer's Group | (United States) Ted Ballou (United States) Andy Lally | Porsche 997 GT3 Cup | 75 |
| 14 | GT | 66 | The Racer's Group | (United States) Ted Ballou (United States) Andy Lally | Porsche 3.6L Flat-6 | 75 |
| 15 | GT | 65 | The Racer's Group | (United States) Craig Stanton (Mexico) Josémanuel Gutierrez | Porsche 997 GT3 Cup | 75 |
| 15 | GT | 65 | The Racer's Group | (United States) Craig Stanton (Mexico) Josémanuel Gutierrez | Porsche 3.6L Flat-6 | 75 |
| 16 | DP | 91 | GAINSCO/Bob Stallings Racing | (United States) Jim Matthews (Belgium) Marc Goosens | Riley Mk. XX | 75 |
| 16 | DP | 91 | GAINSCO/Bob Stallings Racing | (United States) Jim Matthews (Belgium) Marc Goosens | Pontiac 5.0L V8 | 75 |
| 17 | GT | 43 | Team Sahlen | (United States) Wayne Nonnamaker (United States) Joe Nonnamaker | Chevrolet Corvette C6 | 75 |
| 17 | GT | 43 | Team Sahlen | (United States) Wayne Nonnamaker (United States) Joe Nonnamaker | Chevrolet 5.7L V8 | 75 |
| 18 | GT | 70 | SpeedSource | (Canada) Sylvain Tremblay (United States) Nick Ham | Mazda RX-8 GT | 75 |
| 18 | GT | 70 | SpeedSource | (Canada) Sylvain Tremblay (United States) Nick Ham | Mazda 2.0L 3-Rotor | 75 |
| 19 | GT | 72 | Autohaus Motorsports | (United States) Lawson Aschenbach (United States) Tim Lewis Jr. (United States) Terry Borcheller | Pontiac GXP.R | 75 |
| 19 | GT | 72 | Autohaus Motorsports | (United States) Lawson Aschenbach (United States) Tim Lewis Jr. (United States) Terry Borcheller | Pontiac 6.0L V8 | 75 |
| 20 | GT | 69 | SpeedSource | (United States) Emil Assentato (United States) Jeff Segal | Mazda RX-8 GT | 75 |
| 20 | GT | 69 | SpeedSource | (United States) Emil Assentato (United States) Jeff Segal | Mazda 2.0L 3-Rotor | 75 |
| 21 | GT | 88 | Farnbacher-Loles Racing | (Canada) Dave Lacey (United States) Steve Johnson | Porsche 997 GT3 Cup | 75 |
| 21 | GT | 88 | Farnbacher-Loles Racing | (Canada) Dave Lacey (United States) Steve Johnson | Porsche 3.6L Flat-6 | 75 |
| 22 | DP | 16 | Cheever Racing | (Spain) Antonio Garcia (United Kingdom) Tom Kimber-Smith | Coyote CC/08 | 74 |
| 22 | DP | 16 | Cheever Racing | (Spain) Antonio Garcia (United Kingdom) Tom Kimber-Smith | Pontiac 5.0L V8 | 74 |
| 23 | GT | 07 | Banner Racing | (United States) Paul Edwards (United States) Kelly Collins | Pontiac GXP.R | 74 |
| 23 | GT | 07 | Banner Racing | (United States) Paul Edwards (United States) Kelly Collins | Pontiac 6.0L V8 | 74 |
| 24 | GT | 40 | Hyper Sport | (United States) Joe Foster (United States) Patrick Dempsey | Mazda RX-8 GT | 74 |
| 24 | GT | 40 | Hyper Sport | (United States) Joe Foster (United States) Patrick Dempsey | Mazda 2.0L 3-Rotor | 74 |
| 25 | DP | 3 | Southard Motorsports | (United States) Shane Lewis (United States) Bill Lester | Riley Mk. XI | 74 |
| 25 | DP | 3 | Southard Motorsports | (United States) Shane Lewis (United States) Bill Lester | Lexus 5.0L V8 | 74 |
| 26 DNF | GT | 68 | The Racer's Group | (United States) R.J. Valentine (United States) Bryan Sellers | Porsche 997 GT3 Cup | 73 |
| 26 DNF | GT | 68 | The Racer's Group | (United States) R.J. Valentine (United States) Bryan Sellers | Porsche 3.6L Flat-6 | 73 |
| 27 | GT | 53 | Playboy Racing | (United States) Tommy Constantine (United States) Mike Borkowski | BMW M6 | 73 |
| 27 | GT | 53 | Playboy Racing | (United States) Tommy Constantine (United States) Mike Borkowski | BMW 5.0L V10 | 73 |
| 28 | GT | 71 | Synergy Racing | (United States) Milton Grant (United States) Kevin Grant (United States) Carey Grant | Porsche 997 GT3 Cup | 73 |
| 28 | GT | 71 | Synergy Racing | (United States) Milton Grant (United States) Kevin Grant (United States) Carey Grant | Porsche 3.6L Flat-6 | 73 |
| 29 | DP | 75 | Krohn Racing | (United States) Tracy Krohn (Belgium) Eric van de Poele | Proto-Auto Lola B08/70 | 72 |
| 29 | DP | 75 | Krohn Racing | (United States) Tracy Krohn (Belgium) Eric van de Poele | Pontiac 5.0L V8 | 72 |
| 30 | GT | 30 | Racers Edge Motorsports | (United States) Ross Smith (United States) Craig Stone | Mazda RX-8 GT | 72 |
| 30 | GT | 30 | Racers Edge Motorsports | (United States) Ross Smith (United States) Craig Stone | Mazda 2.0L 3-Rotor | 72 |
| 31 | GT | 42 | Team Sahlen | (United States) Joe Sahlen (United States) Will Nonnamaker | Chevrolet Corvette C6 | 72 |
| 31 | GT | 42 | Team Sahlen | (United States) Joe Sahlen (United States) Will Nonnamaker | Chevrolet 5.7L V8 | 72 |
| 32 | DP | 77 | Doran Racing | **(Mexico)** Memo Gidley (United States) Brad Jaeger | Dallara DP01 | 71 |
| 32 | DP | 77 | Doran Racing | **(Mexico)** Memo Gidley (United States) Brad Jaeger | Ford 5.0L V8 | 71 |
| 33 | GT | 74 | George T. Smith | (United States) Derek Skea (United States) Zach Schiff (United States) Anthony Lazzaro | Porsche 997 GT3 Cup | 69 |
| 33 | GT | 74 | George T. Smith | (United States) Derek Skea (United States) Zach Schiff (United States) Anthony Lazzaro | Porsche 3.6L Flat-6 | 69 |
| 34 | DP | 6 | Michael Shank Racing | (United States) John Pew (United Kingdom) Ian James | Riley Mk. XI | 67 |
| 34 | DP | 6 | Michael Shank Racing | (United States) John Pew (United Kingdom) Ian James | Ford 5.0L V8 | 67 |
| 35 | GT | 87 | Farnbacher-Loles Racing | (Germany) Dirk Werner (United States) Bryce Miller | Porsche 997 GT3 Cup | 66 |
| 35 | GT | 87 | Farnbacher-Loles Racing | (Germany) Dirk Werner (United States) Bryce Miller | Porsche 3.6L Flat-6 | 66 |
| 36 DNF | DP | 09 | Spirit of Daytona Racing | (United States) Guy Cosmo (Canada) Marc-Antoine Camirand | Coyote CC/08 | 25 |
| 36 DNF | DP | 09 | Spirit of Daytona Racing | (United States) Guy Cosmo (Canada) Marc-Antoine Camirand | Porsche 5.0L V8 | 25 |
| 37 | GT | 67 | The Racer's Group | (United States) Tim George Jr. (United States) Spencer Pumpelly | Porsche 997 GT3 Cup | 24 |
| 37 | GT | 67 | The Racer's Group | (United States) Tim George Jr. (United States) Spencer Pumpelly | Porsche 3.6L Flat-6 | 24 |
| 38 DNF | DP | 2 | SAMAX Motorsport | (United States) Henry Zogaib (Scotland) Ryan Dalziel | Riley Mk. XI | 10 |
| 38 DNF | DP | 2 | SAMAX Motorsport | (United States) Henry Zogaib (Scotland) Ryan Dalziel | BMW 5.0L V8 | 10 |
| 39 DNF | GT | 06 | Banner Racing | (United States) Marc Bunting (United States) Jan Magnussen | Pontiac GXP.R | 8 |
| 39 DNF | GT | 06 | Banner Racing | (United States) Marc Bunting (United States) Jan Magnussen | Pontiac 6.0L V8 | 8 |
| 40 DNF | GT | 32 | PR1 Motorsports | (Canada) Mike Forest (United States) Thomas Merrill | Pontiac GXP.R | 7 |
| 40 DNF | GT | 32 | PR1 Motorsports | (Canada) Mike Forest (United States) Thomas Merrill | Pontiac 6.0L V8 | 7 |
| 41 DNF | DP | 23 | Alex Job Racing | (United States) Bill Auberlen (United States) Joey Hand | Crawford DP08 | 0 |
| 41 DNF | DP | 23 | Alex Job Racing | (United States) Bill Auberlen (United States) Joey Hand | Porsche 3.99L Flat-6 | 0 |

Rolex Sports Car Series
| Previous race: 2008 Six Hours of Watkins Glen | 2008 season | Next race: 2008 Brumos Porsche 250 |
