= 2021 4 Hours of Spa-Francorchamps =

The layout of the Circuit de Spa-Francorchamps, where the race was held.

The 2021 4 Hours of Spa-Francorchamps was an endurance sportscar racing event held on 19 September 2021, at Circuit de Spa-Francorchamps. It was the fifth round of the 2021 European Le Mans Series.

== Entry list ==
The entry list was revealed on 13 September 2021, and saw 39 entries: 14 in LMP2, 16 in LMP3 and 9 in LMGTE.

== Race ==
=== Race Result ===
Class winners are marked in bold and ‡.

Pos.	Class	No.	Team	Drivers	Chassis	Tyre	Laps	Time/Retired
Pos.	Class	No.	Team	Drivers	Engine	Tyre	Laps	Time/Retired
1	**LMP2**	**41**	**(Belgium) Team WRT**	**(Switzerland) Louis Delétraz** **(Poland) Robert Kubica** **(China) Ye Yifei**	**Oreca 07**	G	**99**	**4:01:14.485‡**
1	**LMP2**	**41**	**(Belgium) Team WRT**	**(Switzerland) Louis Delétraz** **(Poland) Robert Kubica** **(China) Ye Yifei**	**Gibson GK428 4.2 L V8**	G	**99**	**4:01:14.485‡**
2	LMP2	30	(France) Duqueine Team	(France) Tristan Gommendy (Austria) René Binder (Mexico) Memo Rojas	Oreca 07	G	99	+5.318
2	LMP2	30	(France) Duqueine Team	(France) Tristan Gommendy (Austria) René Binder (Mexico) Memo Rojas	Gibson GK428 4.2 L V8	G	99	+5.318
3	LMP2	65	(France) Panis Racing	(France) Julien Canal (United Kingdom) Will Stevens (Australia) James Allen	Oreca 07	G	99	+19.544
3	LMP2	65	(France) Panis Racing	(France) Julien Canal (United Kingdom) Will Stevens (Australia) James Allen	Gibson GK428 4.2 L V8	G	99	+19.544
4	**LMP2 Pro-Am**	**37**	**(Switzerland) Cool Racing**	**(Switzerland) Alexandre Coigny** **(France) Nicolas Lapierre** **(France) Charles Milesi**	**Oreca 07**	G	**99**	**+23.198‡**
4	**LMP2 Pro-Am**	**37**	**(Switzerland) Cool Racing**	**(Switzerland) Alexandre Coigny** **(France) Nicolas Lapierre** **(France) Charles Milesi**	**Gibson GK428 4.2 L V8**	G	**99**	**+23.198‡**
5	LMP2	32	(United Kingdom) United Autosports	(France) Nico Jamin (Venezuela) Manuel Maldonado (Netherlands) Job van Uitert	Oreca 07	G	99	+26.236
5	LMP2	32	(United Kingdom) United Autosports	(France) Nico Jamin (Venezuela) Manuel Maldonado (Netherlands) Job van Uitert	Gibson GK428 4.2 L V8	G	99	+26.236
6	LMP2	28	(France) IDEC Sport	(France) Paul Lafargue (France) Paul-Loup Chatin (France) Patrick Pilet	Oreca 07	G	99	+1:07.468
6	LMP2	28	(France) IDEC Sport	(France) Paul Lafargue (France) Paul-Loup Chatin (France) Patrick Pilet	Gibson GK428 4.2 L V8	G	99	+1:07.468
7	LMP2 Pro-Am	25	(Russia) G-Drive Racing	(United States) John Falb (Portugal) Rui Andrade (United States) Gustavo Menezes	Oreca 07	G	99	+1:24.134
7	LMP2 Pro-Am	25	(Russia) G-Drive Racing	(United States) John Falb (Portugal) Rui Andrade (United States) Gustavo Menezes	Gibson GK428 4.2 L V8	G	99	+1:24.134
8	LMP2	22	(United Kingdom) United Autosports	(United Kingdom) Philip Hanson (South Africa) Jonathan Aberdein (United Kingdom) Tom Gamble	Oreca 07	G	99	+1:33.014
8	LMP2	22	(United Kingdom) United Autosports	(United Kingdom) Philip Hanson (South Africa) Jonathan Aberdein (United Kingdom) Tom Gamble	Gibson GK428 4.2 L V8	G	99	+1:33.014
9	LMP2	35	(United Kingdom) BHK Motorsport	(Italy) Francesco Dracone (Italy) Sergio Campana (Germany) Markus Pommer	Oreca 07	G	98	+1 Lap
9	LMP2	35	(United Kingdom) BHK Motorsport	(Italy) Francesco Dracone (Italy) Sergio Campana (Germany) Markus Pommer	Gibson GK428 4.2 L V8	G	98	+1 Lap
10	LMP2	29	(France) Ultimate	(France) Matthieu Lahaye (France) Jean-Baptiste Lahaye	Oreca 07	G	98	+1 Lap
10	LMP2	29	(France) Ultimate	(France) Matthieu Lahaye (France) Jean-Baptiste Lahaye	Gibson GK428 4.2 L V8	G	98	+1 Lap
11	**LMP3**	**4**	**(Luxembourg) DKR Engineering**	**(Germany) Laurents Hörr** **(France) Mathieu de Barbuat**	**Ligier JS P320**	MI	**96**	**+3 Laps‡**
11	**LMP3**	**4**	**(Luxembourg) DKR Engineering**	**(Germany) Laurents Hörr** **(France) Mathieu de Barbuat**	**Nissan VK56DE 5.6 L V8**	MI	**96**	**+3 Laps‡**
12	LMP3	19	(Switzerland) Cool Racing	(Switzerland) Nicolas Maulini (United Kingdom) Matt Bell (Germany) Niklas Krütten	Ligier JS P320	MI	96	+3 Laps
12	LMP3	19	(Switzerland) Cool Racing	(Switzerland) Nicolas Maulini (United Kingdom) Matt Bell (Germany) Niklas Krütten	Nissan VK56DE 5.6 L V8	MI	96	+3 Laps
13	LMP3	2	(United Kingdom) United Autosports	(United Kingdom) Wayne Boyd (United Kingdom) Rob Wheldon (France) Edouard Cauhaupe	Ligier JS P320	MI	96	+3 Laps
13	LMP3	2	(United Kingdom) United Autosports	(United Kingdom) Wayne Boyd (United Kingdom) Rob Wheldon (France) Edouard Cauhaupe	Nissan VK56DE 5.6 L V8	MI	96	+3 Laps
14	LMP3	8	(France) Graff Racing	(France) Eric Trouillet (Switzerland) Sébastien Page (Switzerland) David Droux	Ligier JS P320	MI	95	+4 Laps
14	LMP3	8	(France) Graff Racing	(France) Eric Trouillet (Switzerland) Sébastien Page (Switzerland) David Droux	Nissan VK56DE 5.6 L V8	MI	95	+4 Laps
15	LMP3	20	(Poland) Team Virage	(United States) Rob Hodes (Canada) Garett Grist (United States) C. R. Crews	Ligier JS P320	MI	95	+4 Laps
15	LMP3	20	(Poland) Team Virage	(United States) Rob Hodes (Canada) Garett Grist (United States) C. R. Crews	Nissan VK56DE 5.6 L V8	MI	95	+4 Laps
16	LMP3	18	(Italy) 1 AIM Villorba Corse	(Italy) Alessandro Bressan (Greece) Andreas Laskaratos (Italy) Damiano Fioravanti	Ligier JS P320	MI	95	+4 Laps
16	LMP3	18	(Italy) 1 AIM Villorba Corse	(Italy) Alessandro Bressan (Greece) Andreas Laskaratos (Italy) Damiano Fioravanti	Nissan VK56DE 5.6 L V8	MI	95	+4 Laps
17	LMP3	9	(France) Graff Racing	(Liechtenstein) Matthias Kaiser (Finland) Rory Penttinen	Ligier JS P320	MI	94	+5 Laps
17	LMP3	9	(France) Graff Racing	(Liechtenstein) Matthias Kaiser (Finland) Rory Penttinen	Nissan VK56DE 5.6 L V8	MI	94	+5 Laps
18	LMP3	3	(United Kingdom) United Autosports	(United States) Jim McGuire (United Kingdom) Duncan Tappy (United Kingdom) Andrew Bentley	Ligier JS P320	MI	94	+5 Laps
18	LMP3	3	(United Kingdom) United Autosports	(United States) Jim McGuire (United Kingdom) Duncan Tappy (United Kingdom) Andrew Bentley	Nissan VK56DE 5.6 L V8	MI	94	+5 Laps
19	**LMGTE**	**88**	**(Italy) AF Corse**	**(France) Emmanuel Collard** **(France) François Perrodo** **(Italy) Alessio Rovera**	**Ferrari 488 GTE Evo**	G	**93**	**+6 Laps‡**
19	**LMGTE**	**88**	**(Italy) AF Corse**	**(France) Emmanuel Collard** **(France) François Perrodo** **(Italy) Alessio Rovera**	**Ferrari F154CB 3.9 L Turbo V8**	G	**93**	**+6 Laps‡**
20	LMGTE	80	(Italy) Iron Lynx	(Italy) Matteo Cressoni (Italy) Rino Mastronardi (Spain) Miguel Molina	Ferrari 488 GTE Evo	G	93	+6 Laps
20	LMGTE	80	(Italy) Iron Lynx	(Italy) Matteo Cressoni (Italy) Rino Mastronardi (Spain) Miguel Molina	Ferrari F154CB 3.9 L Turbo V8	G	93	+6 Laps
21	LMP3	6	(United Kingdom) Nielsen Racing	(United Kingdom) Nicholas Adcock (United States) Austin McCusker (Netherlands) Max Koebolt	Ligier JS P320	MI	93	+6 Laps
21	LMP3	6	(United Kingdom) Nielsen Racing	(United Kingdom) Nicholas Adcock (United States) Austin McCusker (Netherlands) Max Koebolt	Nissan VK56DE 5.6 L V8	MI	93	+6 Laps
22	LMGTE	83	(Italy) Iron Lynx	(Switzerland) Rahel Frey (Denmark) Michelle Gatting (Belgium) Sarah Bovy	Ferrari 488 GTE Evo	G	93	+6 Laps
22	LMGTE	83	(Italy) Iron Lynx	(Switzerland) Rahel Frey (Denmark) Michelle Gatting (Belgium) Sarah Bovy	Ferrari F154CB 3.9 L Turbo V8	G	93	+6 Laps
23	LMGTE	93	(Germany) Proton Competition	(Republic of Ireland) Michael Fassbender (Germany) Felipe Fernández Laser (Austria) Richard Lietz	Porsche 911 RSR-19	G	93	+6 Laps
23	LMGTE	93	(Germany) Proton Competition	(Republic of Ireland) Michael Fassbender (Germany) Felipe Fernández Laser (Austria) Richard Lietz	Porsche 4.2 L Flat-6	G	93	+6 Laps
24	LMGTE	60	(Italy) Iron Lynx	(Italy) Claudio Schiavoni (Italy) Giorgio Sernagiotto (Italy) Paolo Ruberti	Ferrari 488 GTE Evo	G	93	+6 Laps
24	LMGTE	60	(Italy) Iron Lynx	(Italy) Claudio Schiavoni (Italy) Giorgio Sernagiotto (Italy) Paolo Ruberti	Ferrari F154CB 3.9 L Turbo V8	G	93	+6 Laps
25	LMGTE	66	(United Kingdom) JMW Motorsport	(United Kingdom) Jody Fannin (Italy) Andrea Fontana (United States) Rodrigo Sales	Ferrari 488 GTE Evo	G	92	+7 Laps
25	LMGTE	66	(United Kingdom) JMW Motorsport	(United Kingdom) Jody Fannin (Italy) Andrea Fontana (United States) Rodrigo Sales	Ferrari F154CB 3.9 L Turbo V8	G	92	+7 Laps
26	LMGTE	77	(Germany) Proton Competition	(Germany) Christian Ried (United States) Cooper MacNeil (Australia) Matt Campbell	Porsche 911 RSR-19	G	92	+7 Laps
26	LMGTE	77	(Germany) Proton Competition	(Germany) Christian Ried (United States) Cooper MacNeil (Australia) Matt Campbell	Porsche 4.2 L Flat-6	G	92	+7 Laps
27	LMGTE	95	(United Kingdom) TF Sport	(United Kingdom) John Hartshorne (United Kingdom) Ross Gunn (United Kingdom) Ollie Hancock	Aston Martin Vantage AMR	G	91	+8 Laps
27	LMGTE	95	(United Kingdom) TF Sport	(United Kingdom) John Hartshorne (United Kingdom) Ross Gunn (United Kingdom) Ollie Hancock	Aston Martin 4.0 L Turbo V8	G	91	+8 Laps
28	LMP3	7	(United Kingdom) Nielsen Racing	(United Kingdom) Anthony Wells (United Kingdom) Colin Noble	Ligier JS P320	MI	91	+8 Laps
28	LMP3	7	(United Kingdom) Nielsen Racing	(United Kingdom) Anthony Wells (United Kingdom) Colin Noble	Nissan VK56DE 5.6 L V8	MI	91	+8 Laps
29	LMP3	11	(Italy) Eurointernational	(Netherlands) Joey Alders (Italy) Jacopo Baratto (Italy) Andrea Dromedari	Ligier JS P320	MI	90	+9 Laps
29	LMP3	11	(Italy) Eurointernational	(Netherlands) Joey Alders (Italy) Jacopo Baratto (Italy) Andrea Dromedari	Nissan VK56DE 5.6 L V8	MI	90	+9 Laps
DNF	LMP3	5	(France) MV2S Racing	(France) Christophe Cresp (France) Fabien Lavergne (France) Adrien Chila	Ligier JS P320	MI	91	Accident
DNF	LMP3	5	(France) MV2S Racing	(France) Christophe Cresp (France) Fabien Lavergne (France) Adrien Chila	Nissan VK56DE 5.6 L V8	MI	91	Accident
DNF	LMP3	14	(Poland) Inter Europol Competition	(Poland) Mateusz Kaprzyk (Italy) Mattia Pasini (Chile) Nico Pino	Ligier JS P320	MI	78	Did not finish
DNF	LMP3	14	(Poland) Inter Europol Competition	(Poland) Mateusz Kaprzyk (Italy) Mattia Pasini (Chile) Nico Pino	Nissan VK56DE 5.6 L V8	MI	78	Did not finish
DNF	LMP3	13	(Poland) Inter Europol Competition	(Germany) Martin Hippe (Belgium) Ugo de Wilde (Australia) Aidan Read	Ligier JS P320	MI	47	Accident
DNF	LMP3	13	(Poland) Inter Europol Competition	(Germany) Martin Hippe (Belgium) Ugo de Wilde (Australia) Aidan Read	Nissan VK56DE 5.6 L V8	MI	47	Accident
DNF	LMP2	24	(Portugal) Algarve Pro Racing	(Mexico) Diego Menchaca (Austria) Ferdinand Habsburg (United Kingdom) Richard Bradley	Oreca 07	G	19	Contact
DNF	LMP2	24	(Portugal) Algarve Pro Racing	(Mexico) Diego Menchaca (Austria) Ferdinand Habsburg (United Kingdom) Richard Bradley	Gibson GK428 4.2 L V8	G	19	Contact
DNF	LMP3	15	(United Kingdom) RLR MSport	(United Kingdom) Michael Benham (United Kingdom) Alex Kapadia (Denmark) Malthe Jakobsen	Ligier JS P320	MI	19	Contact
DNF	LMP3	15	(United Kingdom) RLR MSport	(United Kingdom) Michael Benham (United Kingdom) Alex Kapadia (Denmark) Malthe Jakobsen	Nissan VK56DE 5.6 L V8	MI	19	Contact
DNF	LMGTE	55	(Switzerland) Spirit of Race	(United Kingdom) Duncan Cameron (Republic of Ireland) Matt Griffin (South Africa) David Perel	Ferrari 488 GTE Evo	G	18	Contact
DNF	LMGTE	55	(Switzerland) Spirit of Race	(United Kingdom) Duncan Cameron (Republic of Ireland) Matt Griffin (South Africa) David Perel	Ferrari F154CB 3.9 L Turbo V8	G	18	Contact
DNF	LMP2 Pro-Am	34	Racing Team Turkey	(Turkey) Salih Yoluç (Republic of Ireland) Charlie Eastwood (United Kingdom) Harry Tincknell	Oreca 07	G	13	Accident
DNF	LMP2 Pro-Am	34	Racing Team Turkey	(Turkey) Salih Yoluç (Republic of Ireland) Charlie Eastwood (United Kingdom) Harry Tincknell	Gibson GK428 4.2 L V8	G	13	Accident
DNF	LMP2	26	(Russia) G-Drive Racing	(Russia) Roman Rusinov (Argentina) Franco Colapinto (Netherlands) Nyck de Vries	Oreca 07	G	1	Loss of drive
DNF	LMP2	26	(Russia) G-Drive Racing	(Russia) Roman Rusinov (Argentina) Franco Colapinto (Netherlands) Nyck de Vries	Gibson GK428 4.2 L V8	G	1	Loss of drive

European Le Mans Series
Previous race: 4 Hours of Monza	2021 season	Next race: 4 Hours of Portimão
