= 2021 4 Hours of Monza =

The layout of the Monza Circuit, where the race was held.

The 2021 4 Hours of Monza was an endurance sportscar racing event held on 11 July, 2021, at Monza Circuit. It was the fourth round of the 2021 European Le Mans Series.

== Entry list ==
The entry list was revealed on 30 June 2021, and saw 44 entries: 19 in LMP2, 16 in LMP3 and 9 in LMGTE. The No. 32 United Autosports Oreca 07-Gibson entry was withdrawn after Job van Uitert contracted COVID-19.

== Race ==
=== Race Result ===
Class winners are marked in bold and ‡.

Pos.	Class	No.	Team	Drivers	Chassis	Tyre	Laps	Time/Retired
Pos.	Class	No.	Team	Drivers	Engine	Tyre	Laps	Time/Retired
1	**LMP2**	**65**	**(France) Panis Racing**	**(France) Julien Canal** **(United Kingdom) Will Stevens** **(Australia) James Allen**	**Oreca 07**	G	**125**	**4:00:56.924‡**
1	**LMP2**	**65**	**(France) Panis Racing**	**(France) Julien Canal** **(United Kingdom) Will Stevens** **(Australia) James Allen**	**Gibson GK428 4.2 L V8**	G	**125**	**4:00:56.924‡**
2	LMP2	22	(United Kingdom) United Autosports	(United Kingdom) Philip Hanson (South Africa) Jonathan Aberdein (United Kingdom) Tom Gamble	Oreca 07	G	125	+5.131
2	LMP2	22	(United Kingdom) United Autosports	(United Kingdom) Philip Hanson (South Africa) Jonathan Aberdein (United Kingdom) Tom Gamble	Gibson GK428 4.2 L V8	G	125	+5.131
3	LMP2	82	(United Kingdom) Jota Sport	(Indonesia) Sean Gelael (Malaysia) Jazeman Jaafar	Oreca 07	G	125	+34.420
3	LMP2	82	(United Kingdom) Jota Sport	(Indonesia) Sean Gelael (Malaysia) Jazeman Jaafar	Gibson GK428 4.2 L V8	G	125	+34.420
4	LMP2	41	(Belgium) Team WRT	(Switzerland) Louis Delétraz (Poland) Robert Kubica (China) Ye Yifei	Oreca 07	G	125	+41.783
4	LMP2	41	(Belgium) Team WRT	(Switzerland) Louis Delétraz (Poland) Robert Kubica (China) Ye Yifei	Gibson GK428 4.2 L V8	G	125	+41.783
5	LMP2	30	(France) Duqueine Team	(France) Tristan Gommendy (Austria) René Binder (Mexico) Memo Rojas	Oreca 07	G	124	+1 Lap
5	LMP2	30	(France) Duqueine Team	(France) Tristan Gommendy (Austria) René Binder (Mexico) Memo Rojas	Gibson GK428 4.2 L V8	G	124	+1 Lap
6	**LMP2 Pro-Am**	**25**	**(Russia) G-Drive Racing**	**(United States) John Falb** **(Portugal) Rui Andrade** **(Spain) Roberto Merhi**	**Oreca 07**	G	**124**	**+1 Lap‡**
6	**LMP2 Pro-Am**	**25**	**(Russia) G-Drive Racing**	**(United States) John Falb** **(Portugal) Rui Andrade** **(Spain) Roberto Merhi**	**Gibson GK428 4.2 L V8**	G	**124**	**+1 Lap‡**
7	LMP2 Pro-Am	34	Racing Team Turkey	(Turkey) Salih Yoluç (Republic of Ireland) Charlie Eastwood (United States) Logan Sargeant	Oreca 07	G	124	+1 Lap
7	LMP2 Pro-Am	34	Racing Team Turkey	(Turkey) Salih Yoluç (Republic of Ireland) Charlie Eastwood (United States) Logan Sargeant	Gibson GK428 4.2 L V8	G	124	+1 Lap
8	LMP2	26	(Russia) G-Drive Racing	(Russia) Roman Rusinov (Argentina) Franco Colapinto (Denmark) Mikkel Jensen	Oreca 07	G	124	+1 Lap
8	LMP2	26	(Russia) G-Drive Racing	(Russia) Roman Rusinov (Argentina) Franco Colapinto (Denmark) Mikkel Jensen	Gibson GK428 4.2 L V8	G	124	+1 Lap
9	LMP2	28	(France) IDEC Sport	(France) Paul Lafargue (France) Paul-Loup Chatin (France) Patrick Pilet	Oreca 07	G	124	+1 Lap
9	LMP2	28	(France) IDEC Sport	(France) Paul Lafargue (France) Paul-Loup Chatin (France) Patrick Pilet	Gibson GK428 4.2 L V8	G	124	+1 Lap
10	LMP2	24	(Portugal) Algarve Pro Racing	(Mexico) Diego Menchaca (Austria) Ferdinand Habsburg (United Kingdom) Richard Bradley	Oreca 07	G	124	+1 Lap
10	LMP2	24	(Portugal) Algarve Pro Racing	(Mexico) Diego Menchaca (Austria) Ferdinand Habsburg (United Kingdom) Richard Bradley	Gibson GK428 4.2 L V8	G	124	+1 Lap
11	LMP2 Pro-Am	29	(France) Ultimate	(France) Matthieu Lahaye (France) Jean-Baptiste Lahaye (France) François Heriau	Oreca 07	G	124	+1 Lap
11	LMP2 Pro-Am	29	(France) Ultimate	(France) Matthieu Lahaye (France) Jean-Baptiste Lahaye (France) François Heriau	Gibson GK428 4.2 L V8	G	124	+1 Lap
12	LMP2 Pro-Am	37	(Switzerland) Cool Racing	(Switzerland) Alexandre Coigny (France) Nicolas Lapierre (Switzerland) Antonin Borga	Oreca 07	G	123	+2 Laps
12	LMP2 Pro-Am	37	(Switzerland) Cool Racing	(Switzerland) Alexandre Coigny (France) Nicolas Lapierre (Switzerland) Antonin Borga	Gibson GK428 4.2 L V8	G	123	+2 Laps
13	LMP2 Pro-Am	92	(Netherlands) Racing Team Nederland	(Netherlands) Frits van Eerd (Netherlands) Giedo van der Garde	Oreca 07	G	123	+2 Laps
13	LMP2 Pro-Am	92	(Netherlands) Racing Team Nederland	(Netherlands) Frits van Eerd (Netherlands) Giedo van der Garde	Gibson GK428 4.2 L V8	G	123	+2 Laps
14	LMP2 Pro-Am	70	(Switzerland) Realteam Racing	(France) Loïc Duval (Switzerland) Esteban García	Oreca 07	G	123	+2 Laps
14	LMP2 Pro-Am	70	(Switzerland) Realteam Racing	(France) Loïc Duval (Switzerland) Esteban García	Gibson GK428 4.2 L V8	G	123	+2 Laps
15	LMP2 Pro-Am	17	(France) IDEC Sport	(United States) Dwight Merriman (United Kingdom) Kyle Tilley (United Kingdom) Ryan Dalziel	Oreca 07	G	122	+3 Laps
15	LMP2 Pro-Am	17	(France) IDEC Sport	(United States) Dwight Merriman (United Kingdom) Kyle Tilley (United Kingdom) Ryan Dalziel	Gibson GK428 4.2 L V8	G	122	+3 Laps
16	LMP2 Pro-Am	39	(France) Graff Racing	(France) Vincent Capillaire (France) Maxime Robin (France) Arnold Robin	Oreca 07	G	122	+3 Laps
16	LMP2 Pro-Am	39	(France) Graff Racing	(France) Vincent Capillaire (France) Maxime Robin (France) Arnold Robin	Gibson GK428 4.2 L V8	G	122	+3 Laps
17	LMP2 Pro-Am	21	(United States) DragonSpeed USA	(United Kingdom) Ben Hanley (Sweden) Henrik Hedman (Colombia) Juan Pablo Montoya	Oreca 07	G	122	+3 Laps
17	LMP2 Pro-Am	21	(United States) DragonSpeed USA	(United Kingdom) Ben Hanley (Sweden) Henrik Hedman (Colombia) Juan Pablo Montoya	Gibson GK428 4.2 L V8	G	122	+3 Laps
18	LMP2	35	(United Kingdom) BHK Motorsport	(Italy) Francesco Dracone (Italy) Sergio Campana (Germany) Markus Pommer	Oreca 07	G	122	+3 Laps
18	LMP2	35	(United Kingdom) BHK Motorsport	(Italy) Francesco Dracone (Italy) Sergio Campana (Germany) Markus Pommer	Gibson GK428 4.2 L V8	G	122	+3 Laps
19	**LMP3**	**4**	**(Luxembourg) DKR Engineering**	**(Germany) Laurents Hörr** **(France) Mathieu de Barbuat**	**Ligier JS P320**	MI	**119**	**+6 Laps‡**
19	**LMP3**	**4**	**(Luxembourg) DKR Engineering**	**(Germany) Laurents Hörr** **(France) Mathieu de Barbuat**	**Nissan VK56DE 5.6 L V8**	MI	**119**	**+6 Laps‡**
20	LMP3	2	(United Kingdom) United Autosports	(United Kingdom) Wayne Boyd (United Kingdom) Rob Wheldon (France) Edouard Cauhaupe	Ligier JS P320	MI	119	+6 Laps
20	LMP3	2	(United Kingdom) United Autosports	(United Kingdom) Wayne Boyd (United Kingdom) Rob Wheldon (France) Edouard Cauhaupe	Nissan VK56DE 5.6 L V8	MI	119	+6 Laps
21	LMP3	13	(Poland) Inter Europol Competition	(Germany) Martin Hippe (Belgium) Ugo de Wilde (Italy) Mattia Pasini	Ligier JS P320	MI	119	+6 Laps
21	LMP3	13	(Poland) Inter Europol Competition	(Germany) Martin Hippe (Belgium) Ugo de Wilde (Italy) Mattia Pasini	Nissan VK56DE 5.6 L V8	MI	119	+6 Laps
22	LMP3	19	(Switzerland) Cool Racing	(Switzerland) Nicolas Maulini (United Kingdom) Matt Bell (Germany) Niklas Krütten	Ligier JS P320	MI	119	+6 Laps
22	LMP3	19	(Switzerland) Cool Racing	(Switzerland) Nicolas Maulini (United Kingdom) Matt Bell (Germany) Niklas Krütten	Nissan VK56DE 5.6 L V8	MI	119	+6 Laps
23	LMP3	20	(Poland) Team Virage	(United States) Rob Hodes (Canada) Garett Grist (United States) C. R. Crews	Ligier JS P320	MI	118	+7 Laps
23	LMP3	20	(Poland) Team Virage	(United States) Rob Hodes (Canada) Garett Grist (United States) C. R. Crews	Nissan VK56DE 5.6 L V8	MI	118	+7 Laps
24	LMP3	5	(France) MV2S Racing	(France) Christophe Cresp (France) Fabien Lavergne (France) Adrien Chila	Ligier JS P320	MI	118	+7 Laps
24	LMP3	5	(France) MV2S Racing	(France) Christophe Cresp (France) Fabien Lavergne (France) Adrien Chila	Nissan VK56DE 5.6 L V8	MI	118	+7 Laps
25	LMP3	14	(Poland) Inter Europol Competition	(France) Erwin Creed (Germany) Marius Zug	Ligier JS P320	MI	118	+7 Laps
25	LMP3	14	(Poland) Inter Europol Competition	(France) Erwin Creed (Germany) Marius Zug	Nissan VK56DE 5.6 L V8	MI	118	+7 Laps
26	LMP3	18	(Italy) 1 AIM Villorba Corse	(Italy) Alessandro Bressan (Greece) Andreas Laskaratos (Italy) Damiano Fioravanti	Ligier JS P320	MI	118	+7 Laps
26	LMP3	18	(Italy) 1 AIM Villorba Corse	(Italy) Alessandro Bressan (Greece) Andreas Laskaratos (Italy) Damiano Fioravanti	Nissan VK56DE 5.6 L V8	MI	118	+7 Laps
27	LMP3	15	(United Kingdom) RLR MSport	(United Kingdom) Michael Benham (United Kingdom) Alex Kapadia (Denmark) Malthe Jakobsen	Ligier JS P320	MI	117	+8 Laps
27	LMP3	15	(United Kingdom) RLR MSport	(United Kingdom) Michael Benham (United Kingdom) Alex Kapadia (Denmark) Malthe Jakobsen	Nissan VK56DE 5.6 L V8	MI	117	+8 Laps
28	LMP3	3	(United Kingdom) United Autosports	(United States) Jim McGuire (United Kingdom) Duncan Tappy (United Kingdom) Andrew Bentley	Ligier JS P320	MI	117	+8 Laps
28	LMP3	3	(United Kingdom) United Autosports	(United States) Jim McGuire (United Kingdom) Duncan Tappy (United Kingdom) Andrew Bentley	Nissan VK56DE 5.6 L V8	MI	117	+8 Laps
29	**LMGTE**	**55**	**(Switzerland) Spirit of Race**	**(United Kingdom) Duncan Cameron** **(Italy) Alessandro Pier Guidi** **(South Africa) David Perel**	**Ferrari 488 GTE Evo**	G	**117**	**+8 Laps‡**
29	**LMGTE**	**55**	**(Switzerland) Spirit of Race**	**(United Kingdom) Duncan Cameron** **(Italy) Alessandro Pier Guidi** **(South Africa) David Perel**	**Ferrari F154CB 3.9 L Turbo V8**	G	**117**	**+8 Laps‡**
30	LMGTE	80	(Italy) Iron Lynx	(Italy) Matteo Cressoni (Italy) Rino Mastronardi (Spain) Miguel Molina	Ferrari 488 GTE Evo	G	117	+8 Laps
30	LMGTE	80	(Italy) Iron Lynx	(Italy) Matteo Cressoni (Italy) Rino Mastronardi (Spain) Miguel Molina	Ferrari F154CB 3.9 L Turbo V8	G	117	+8 Laps
31	LMGTE	88	(Italy) AF Corse	(France) Emmanuel Collard (France) François Perrodo (Italy) Alessio Rovera	Ferrari 488 GTE Evo	G	117	+8 Laps
31	LMGTE	88	(Italy) AF Corse	(France) Emmanuel Collard (France) François Perrodo (Italy) Alessio Rovera	Ferrari F154CB 3.9 L Turbo V8	G	117	+8 Laps
32	LMP3	12	(Luxembourg) Racing Experience	(Luxembourg) David Hauser (Luxembourg) Gary Hauser (Belgium) Tom Cloet	Ligier JS P320	MI	117	+8 Laps
32	LMP3	12	(Luxembourg) Racing Experience	(Luxembourg) David Hauser (Luxembourg) Gary Hauser (Belgium) Tom Cloet	Nissan VK56DE 5.6 L V8	MI	117	+8 Laps
33	LMGTE	66	(United Kingdom) JMW Motorsport	(United Kingdom) Jody Fannin (Italy) Andrea Fontana (United States) Rodrigo Sales	Ferrari 488 GTE Evo	G	117	+8 Laps
33	LMGTE	66	(United Kingdom) JMW Motorsport	(United Kingdom) Jody Fannin (Italy) Andrea Fontana (United States) Rodrigo Sales	Ferrari F154CB 3.9 L Turbo V8	G	117	+8 Laps
34	LMGTE	60	(Italy) Iron Lynx	(Italy) Claudio Schiavoni (Italy) Giorgio Sernagiotto (Italy) Paolo Ruberti	Ferrari 488 GTE Evo	G	117	+8 Laps
34	LMGTE	60	(Italy) Iron Lynx	(Italy) Claudio Schiavoni (Italy) Giorgio Sernagiotto (Italy) Paolo Ruberti	Ferrari F154CB 3.9 L Turbo V8	G	117	+8 Laps
35	LMGTE	83	(Italy) Iron Lynx	(Switzerland) Rahel Frey (Denmark) Michelle Gatting (Italy) Manuela Gostner	Ferrari 488 GTE Evo	G	117	+8 Laps
35	LMGTE	83	(Italy) Iron Lynx	(Switzerland) Rahel Frey (Denmark) Michelle Gatting (Italy) Manuela Gostner	Ferrari F154CB 3.9 L Turbo V8	G	117	+8 Laps
36	LMP3	6	(United Kingdom) Nielsen Racing	(United Kingdom) Nicholas Adcock (United States) Austin McCusker (Netherlands) Max Koebolt	Ligier JS P320	MI	117	+8 Laps
36	LMP3	6	(United Kingdom) Nielsen Racing	(United Kingdom) Nicholas Adcock (United States) Austin McCusker (Netherlands) Max Koebolt	Nissan VK56DE 5.6 L V8	MI	117	+8 Laps
37	LMGTE	93	(Germany) Proton Competition	(Republic of Ireland) Michael Fassbender (Germany) Felipe Fernández Laser (Austria) Richard Lietz	Porsche 911 RSR-19	G	116	+9 Laps
37	LMGTE	93	(Germany) Proton Competition	(Republic of Ireland) Michael Fassbender (Germany) Felipe Fernández Laser (Austria) Richard Lietz	Porsche 4.2 L Flat-6	G	116	+9 Laps
38	LMGTE	95	(United Kingdom) TF Sport	(United Kingdom) John Hartshorne (United Kingdom) Ross Gunn (United Kingdom) Ollie Hancock	Aston Martin Vantage AMR	G	115	+10 Laps
38	LMGTE	95	(United Kingdom) TF Sport	(United Kingdom) John Hartshorne (United Kingdom) Ross Gunn (United Kingdom) Ollie Hancock	Aston Martin 4.0 L Turbo V8	G	115	+10 Laps
39	LMGTE	77	(Germany) Proton Competition	(Germany) Christian Ried (United States) Cooper MacNeil (Italy) Gianmaria Bruni	Porsche 911 RSR-19	G	115	+10 Laps
39	LMGTE	77	(Germany) Proton Competition	(Germany) Christian Ried (United States) Cooper MacNeil (Italy) Gianmaria Bruni	Porsche 4.2 L Flat-6	G	115	+10 Laps
40	LMP3	8	(France) Graff Racing	(France) Eric Trouillet (Switzerland) Sébastien Page (Switzerland) David Droux	Ligier JS P320	MI	111	+14 Laps
40	LMP3	8	(France) Graff Racing	(France) Eric Trouillet (Switzerland) Sébastien Page (Switzerland) David Droux	Nissan VK56DE 5.6 L V8	MI	111	+14 Laps
41	LMP3	9	(France) Graff Racing	(Liechtenstein) Matthias Kaiser (Finland) Rory Penttinen	Ligier JS P320	MI	99	+26 Laps
41	LMP3	9	(France) Graff Racing	(Liechtenstein) Matthias Kaiser (Finland) Rory Penttinen	Nissan VK56DE 5.6 L V8	MI	99	+26 Laps
DNF	LMP3	7	(United Kingdom) Nielsen Racing	(United Kingdom) Anthony Wells (United Kingdom) Colin Noble	Ligier JS P320	MI	79	Contact
DNF	LMP3	7	(United Kingdom) Nielsen Racing	(United Kingdom) Anthony Wells (United Kingdom) Colin Noble	Nissan VK56DE 5.6 L V8	MI	79	Contact

European Le Mans Series
Previous race: 4 Hours of Le Castellet	2021 season	Next race: 4 Hours of Spa-Francorchamps
