= Team Penske =

American auto racing team

(United States) Team Penske
- Owner(s): Roger Penske (Penske Corporation)
- Principal(s): Jonathan Diuguid (IndyCar, IMSA); Michael Nelson (NASCAR)
- Base: Mooresville, North Carolina
- Series: IndyCar Series; NASCAR Cup Series; IMSA SportsCar Championship
- Race drivers: IndyCar Series: 2. (United States) Josef Newgarden; 3. (New Zealand) Scott McLaughlin; 12. (United States) David Malukas; Cup Series: 2. (United States) Austin Cindric; 12. (United States) Ryan Blaney; 22. (United States) Joey Logano; IMSA SportsCar Championship: 6. (Australia) Matt Campbell; (France) Kévin Estre (Belgium) Laurens Vanthoor; 7. (France) Julien Andlauer (Germany) Laurin Heinrich (Brazil) Felipe Nasr
- Manufacturer: IndyCar: Chevrolet; NASCAR: Ford; IMSA SportsCar Championship: Porsche
- Website: teampenske.com

Career
- Debut: IndyCar Series: 1968 Telegraph Trophy 200 (Mosport); Cup Series: 1972 Winston Western 500 (Riverside); Xfinity Series: 1997 Kenwood Home & Car Audio 300 (Fontana); Craftsman Truck Series: 1996 Craftsman 200 (Portland); ARCA Racing Series: 2000 Flagstar 200 (Michigan)
- Latest race: IndyCar Series: 2026 Mission Grand Prix of Monterey (Laguna Seca); Cup Series: 2026 Season Finale 400 (Homestead); Xfinity Series: 2021 NASCAR Xfinity Series Championship Race (Phoenix); Craftsman Truck Series: 1996 GM Goodwrench/AC Delco 300 (Phoenix); ARCA Racing Series: 2016 General Tire#AnywhereIsPossible 200 (Pocono)
- Drivers' Championships: Total: 44; USAC: 9 IndyCar Series: 6 CART: 9 Cup Series: 5 Xfinity Series: 2 IMSA (DPi): 2 WEC (Hypercar): 1 ALMS (LMP2): 3 VASC: 3 Can-Am: 2 USRRC: 2
- Indy 500 victories: 20 (1972, 1979, 1981, 1984, 1985, 1987, 1988, 1991, 1993, 1994, 2001, 2002, 2003, 2006, 2009, 2015, 2018, 2019, 2023, 2024)
- Race victories: Total: 670; IndyCar Series: 249; Cup Series: 163; Xfinity Series: 81

Team Penske (formerly known as Penske Racing) is an American professional auto racing organization that competes in the IndyCar Series, NASCAR Cup Series, and the IMSA SportsCar Championship. The team made its competitive debut at the 1966 24 Hours of Daytona and has since participated in a wide range of professional motorsport disciplines, including Formula One, Can-Am, Trans-Am, and Australia's Supercars Championship. Over the course of its history, Team Penske has amassed more than 500 race victories and secured over 40 championships across various categories of auto racing. The team operates as a division of Penske Corporation and is owned and chaired by Roger Penske.

== IndyCar Series ==
Team Penske currently fields three entries in the IndyCar Series: the No. 2 Hitachi Dallara/Chevrolet driven by Josef Newgarden, the No. 3 Dallara/Chevrolet driven by Scott McLaughlin, and the No. 12 Verizon Dallara/Chevrolet driven by David Malukas. Among the team's most notable former drivers are four-time Indianapolis 500 winners Al Unser, Rick Mears, and Hélio Castroneves. At the 2024 Indianapolis 500, Team Penske claimed its record 20th victory in the prestigious event. The team has also secured the IndyCar Series championship 16 times.

The open-wheel division of Penske Racing was based in Reading, Pennsylvania from 1973 onward. During the Formula One and CART eras, the team's cars were constructed in Poole, Dorset, England, which also served as the base of the Formula One operation. On October 31, 2005, Penske Racing announced that, following the conclusion of the 2006 IRL season, it would consolidate its IndyCar and NASCAR operations at its facility in Mooresville, North Carolina. However, due to severe flooding in Pennsylvania in 2006, the relocation to Mooresville occurred earlier than originally planned.

=== IndyCar history ===
==== Early days ====
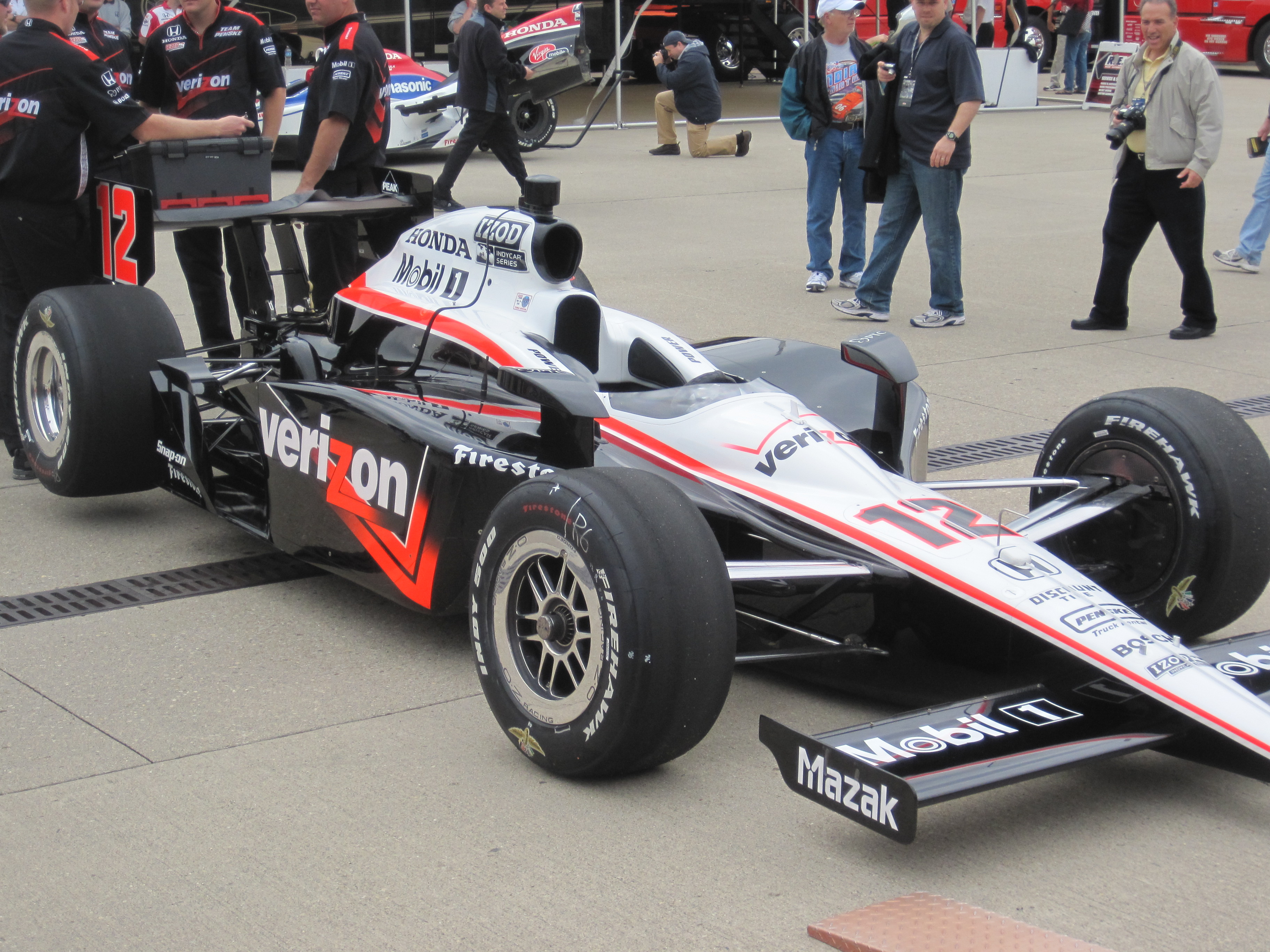
Will Power's car at the 2010 Indianapolis 500

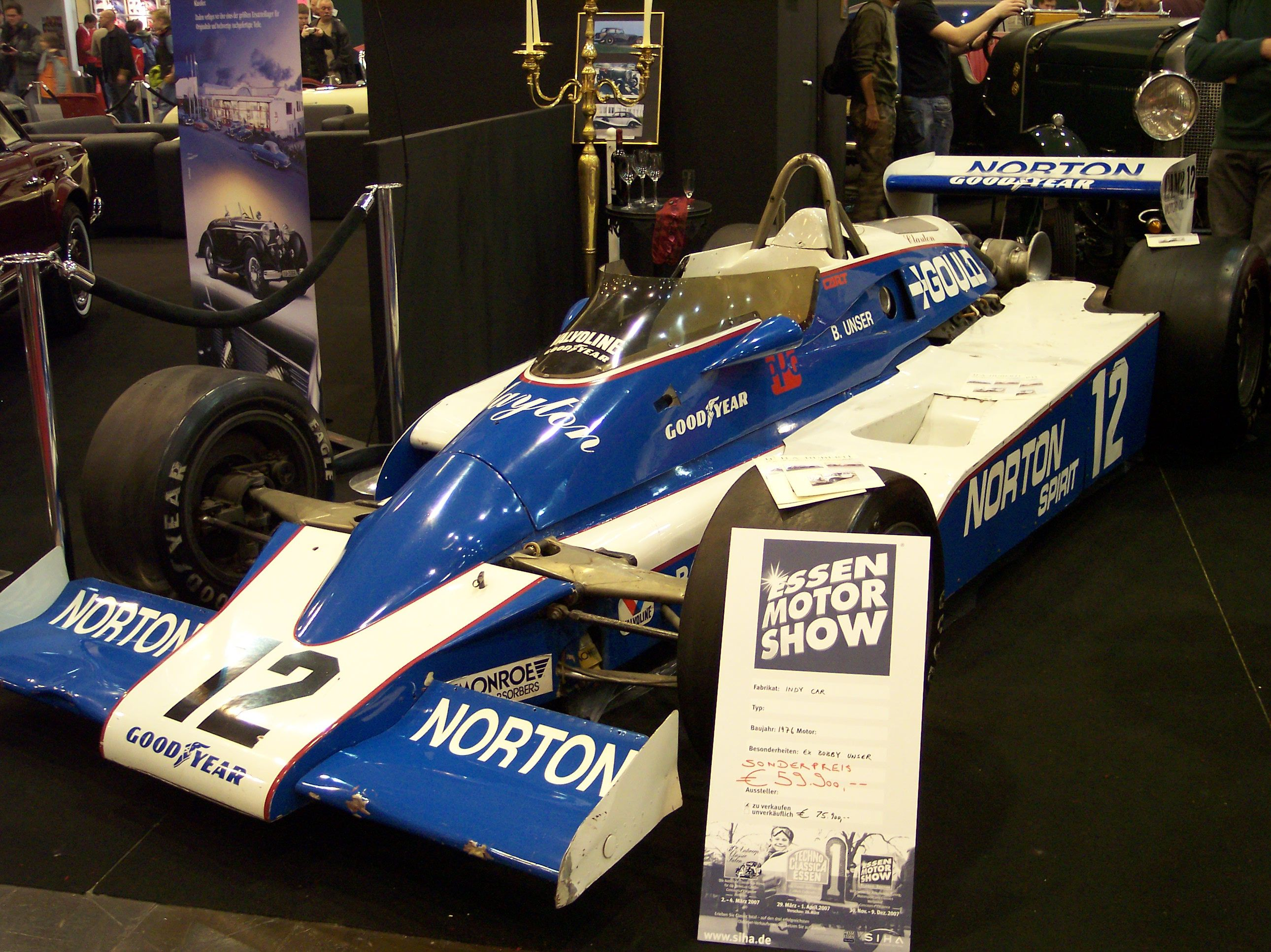
Bobby Unser's Penske Indy car

Team Penske's involvement in IndyCar racing dates back to 1968, when Roger Penske first entered the series with a stock block-powered Eagle chassis driven by Mark Donohue. The team made its debut at the Indianapolis 500 in 1969, where Donohue earned the title of Rookie of the Year. In 1971, Donohue delivered Team Penske's first IndyCar victory at the Pocono 500, and the following year, he secured the team's first Indianapolis 500 victory in May 1972.

In 1978, Penske - alongside Pat Patrick, Dan Gurney, and several other prominent team owners - co-founded Championship Auto Racing Teams (CART). This new sanctioning body was formed in response to ongoing disputes with USAC, and it governed what were then commonly referred to as Champ Cars or IndyCars.

As of August 11, 2025, Team Penske has achieved:

- 20 victories in the Indianapolis 500
- 18 pole positions at the Indianapolis 500
- 200* open-wheel race wins across USAC, CART, and IRL
- 29 victories in 500-mile races
- 13 open-wheel championships

In total, the team has made 2,064 starts in IndyCar competition, earned 231 pole positions, 244 wins, and 308 poles.

==== Oldsmobile and Chevrolet engines era ====
In 2001, Team Penske returned to the Indianapolis 500 after a five-year absence, a result of the open-wheel split that followed the 1995 PPG IndyCar World Series season. The team competed using Oldsmobile engines. Later that year, Roger Penske announced that the organization would withdraw from CART and fully transition to the IRL IndyCar Series beginning with the 2002 season, this time with support from Chevrolet engines.

==== Toyota engines (2003–2005) ====
Following Toyota's decision to transition from CART/Champ Car to the IRL IndyCar Series, Team Penske announced on April 2, 2002, that it would switch to Toyota engines beginning with the 2003 season. The partnership began successfully, highlighted by Gil de Ferran's victory at the 2003 Indianapolis 500.

However, performance began to decline in 2004, with the team achieving only two race wins, five pole positions, and three fastest laps, a noticeable drop from the previous year. This decline was attributed in part to driver errors and on-track incidents. In 2005, the team experienced a modest resurgence, securing three wins and two pole positions, though overall performance remained below expectations compared to earlier seasons.

==== Honda engines (2006–2011) ====
On October 31, 2005, it was announced that Team Penske would end its engine partnership with Toyota and switch to Honda, signing an initial five-year agreement. This marked a renewed collaboration, as Penske had previously worked with Honda engines during the 2000-2001 CART Champ Car seasons. Following the announcement, the team confirmed Hélio Castroneves and Sam Hornish Jr. as its official race drivers.

Despite Honda's status as a single engine supplier in IndyCar at the time, Penske received de facto factory support, with engines delivered directly from Honda's racing divisions in Japan and the United States, along with tuning assistance from Ilmor Engineering in Plymouth, Michigan. The partnership began strongly in 2006, as Sam Hornish Jr. won both the Indianapolis 500 and the IndyCar Series championship.

The Castroneves-Hornish Jr. pairing remained intact for 2007. The second year of the Honda partnership showed initial promise, with the team contending for both the Indianapolis 500 and the season championship. However, a series of driver errors and on-track incidents resulted in only two race victories, and the team failed to secure any major titles - its first such outcome since 2005.

On November 9, 2007, Sam Hornish Jr. announced his move to the NASCAR Sprint Cup Series for the 2008 season, driving full-time with Team Penske. Four days later, Ryan Briscoe, who had previously competed in Champ Car and the American Le Mans Series, was announced as Castroneves's new teammate.

The 2008 season began slowly for Team Penske. However, Castroneves managed five top-four finishes, including two second-place results. Briscoe took time to adjust to the team and car setup, but ultimately earned his first IndyCar victory at the Milwaukee Mile, while Castroneves claimed a win at Infineon Raceway. Castroneves narrowly missed winning the 2008 championship, finishing second to Scott Dixon after the final round at Chicagoland Speedway.

In 2009, Verizon Wireless joined ExxonMobil (then McLaren's fuel and lubricant partner) as an associate sponsor. The team introduced a third car, the No. 12, driven by Will Power, initially as a substitute for Castroneves. The entry featured primary sponsorship from Verizon and Penske Truck Rental.

The 2010 season marked Team Penske's fifth year with Honda and the first time since 1994 that it fielded a three-car full-time lineup, with Will Power joining Castroneves and Briscoe full-time. The team started the year strongly, winning the first three races. Power emerged as a championship contender, but a suspension failure at the season finale in Homestead-Miami dashed his title hopes. Penske concluded the season with nine wins, thirteen pole positions, and six fastest laps, most of which were achieved by Power.

On November 12, 2010, Team Penske confirmed that it would end its Honda partnership after the 2011 season, switching to Chevrolet engines for 2012. In the final year of the Honda era, the driver lineup of Castroneves, Briscoe, and Power remained unchanged. The team lost ExxonMobil as a sponsor (who moved to Stewart-Haas Racing in NASCAR), with Shell and Pennzoil becoming Penske's official motor oil partners.

The 2011 season began with two early wins for Power, including his first career oval victory at Texas Motor Speedway. Heading into the final round at Las Vegas, Power trailed Dario Franchitti by 18 points. However, on lap 11, Power was involved in a tragic 15-car accident that claimed the life of Dan Wheldon, the defending Indianapolis 500 winner. The race was cancelled in Wheldon's honor, and the championship standings reverted to their pre-race positions, awarding Franchitti his third consecutive and fourth overall title.

Team Penske ended the 2011 season with six victories, all by Will Power, while Castroneves and Briscoe failed to win a race.

==== Return to Chevrolet engines (2012–present) ====
For the 2012 IndyCar Series season, Roger Penske announced Team Penske's return to Chevrolet engines, receiving full factory backing from General Motors. As part of this renewed partnership, the team benefited from free engines supplied formally by Ilmor Engineering - in which Penske holds a stake - and Chevrolet, along with access to official Chevrolet team vehicles, financial support, and technical personnel stationed at the team's Mooresville, North Carolina base.

Penske dominated the early part of the 2012 season, winning four consecutive races. Hélio Castroneves claimed victory in the season opener at St. Petersburg, followed by Will Power winning at Barber, Long Beach, and São Paulo. Although Ryan Briscoe struggled throughout the year, he managed a win at Sonoma. Power, however, came up short in the championship after a crash in the season finale. Briscoe left the team following the season to pursue other opportunities.

In 2014, after finishing runner-up in the championship three consecutive times (2010–2012), Will Power finally clinched the IndyCar Series Championship, adding another title to Team Penske's legacy.

The 2015 season began strongly, with Juan Pablo Montoya winning the opening race - his second with Penske since returning from NASCAR in 2014. Teammates Will Power, Hélio Castroneves, and new signing Simon Pagenaud finished 2nd, 4th, and 5th respectively. Power won at the Grand Prix of Indianapolis, and Montoya captured his second Indianapolis 500 victory shortly after, once again finishing ahead of Power. Despite a strong campaign, Montoya lost the championship to Scott Dixon on a tie-breaker in the final race.

Team Penske dominated the 2016 season, finishing 1st, 2nd, and 3rd in the final standings. Simon Pagenaud capped off the year with a commanding victory and secured his first IndyCar title, becoming the ninth Penske driver to do so. It marked Team Penske's 14th championship, and their second in three years following Power's 2014 win.

In 2017, Penske signed Josef Newgarden from Ed Carpenter Racing. Newgarden quickly delivered, winning the championship that year and again in 2019, giving the team back-to-back titles. Meanwhile, Will Power and Simon Pagenaud claimed back-to-back Indianapolis 500 wins in 2018 and 2019 respectively. In 2020, although Penske drivers won more races than any other team, they missed out on both the Indianapolis 500 and the IndyCar championship, with Newgarden unable to defend his title against Dixon.

The 2021 season saw Team Penske expand to four full-time entries, introducing Scott McLaughlin, a three-time Supercars champion and former DJR Team Penske driver. This marked the first time since Rick Mears in 1978 that Penske signed a driver without any open-wheel racing experience. 2021 proved challenging - McLaughlin needed time to adapt, while all three former champions (Power, Newgarden, Pagenaud) endured their least competitive seasons with Penske. Power and Newgarden each had potential wins slip away due to mechanical failures at Detroit and Road America, and Pagenaud's best finish was third place. The team's performance at the Indianapolis 500 was also disappointing: none qualified in the top 15, Power was nearly bumped from the grid, and Pagenaud's late charge to third was the team's best result.

One highlight was Penske's technical partnership with Paretta Autosport, an all-female-operated team fielding Simona De Silvestro at the 2021 Indy 500. While De Silvestro failed to finish, she qualified for the race in the final grid spot thanks to a Penske-prepped chassis.

Despite struggles, McLaughlin was named both IndyCar Rookie of the Year and Indy 500 Rookie of the Year, while Newgarden finished runner-up in the championship for a second straight season.

For the 2022 season, Simon Pagenaud departed for Meyer Shank Racing, and Team Penske returned to a three-car lineup. Although the team again faced challenges at the Indianapolis 500, their overall performance improved significantly, winning four of the first seven races and nine overall. McLaughlin claimed his first IndyCar win at St. Petersburg, while Power and Newgarden both led the standings during the season. Ultimately, Will Power secured his second championship title at the season finale.

In 2023, Team Penske returned to victory at the Indianapolis 500, with Josef Newgarden winning the 107th running and becoming the first American winner since 2016. Despite this milestone, the rest of the season was underwhelming: only one driver finished in the top three in the standings, the team claimed just one road course win, and Will Power went winless for the first time in 16 years.

In 2024, controversy hit when Josef Newgarden was disqualified from his win at St. Petersburg due to illegal ECU software manipulation, allowing push-to-pass during restarts - explicitly against regulations. It was the first time Penske had a win stripped since Al Unser Jr.'s 1995 Portland victory. Unlike that instance, Penske did not appeal, and team president Tim Cindric received a multi-race paddock ban.

Despite the scandal, the team rebounded with a strong start: all three drivers secured wins in the first seven races, and Josef Newgarden went on to win his second consecutive Indianapolis 500, making him the first back-to-back winner since Hélio Castroneves. The victory marked Team Penske's 20th Indianapolis 500 triumph, solidifying their legendary status in the sport.

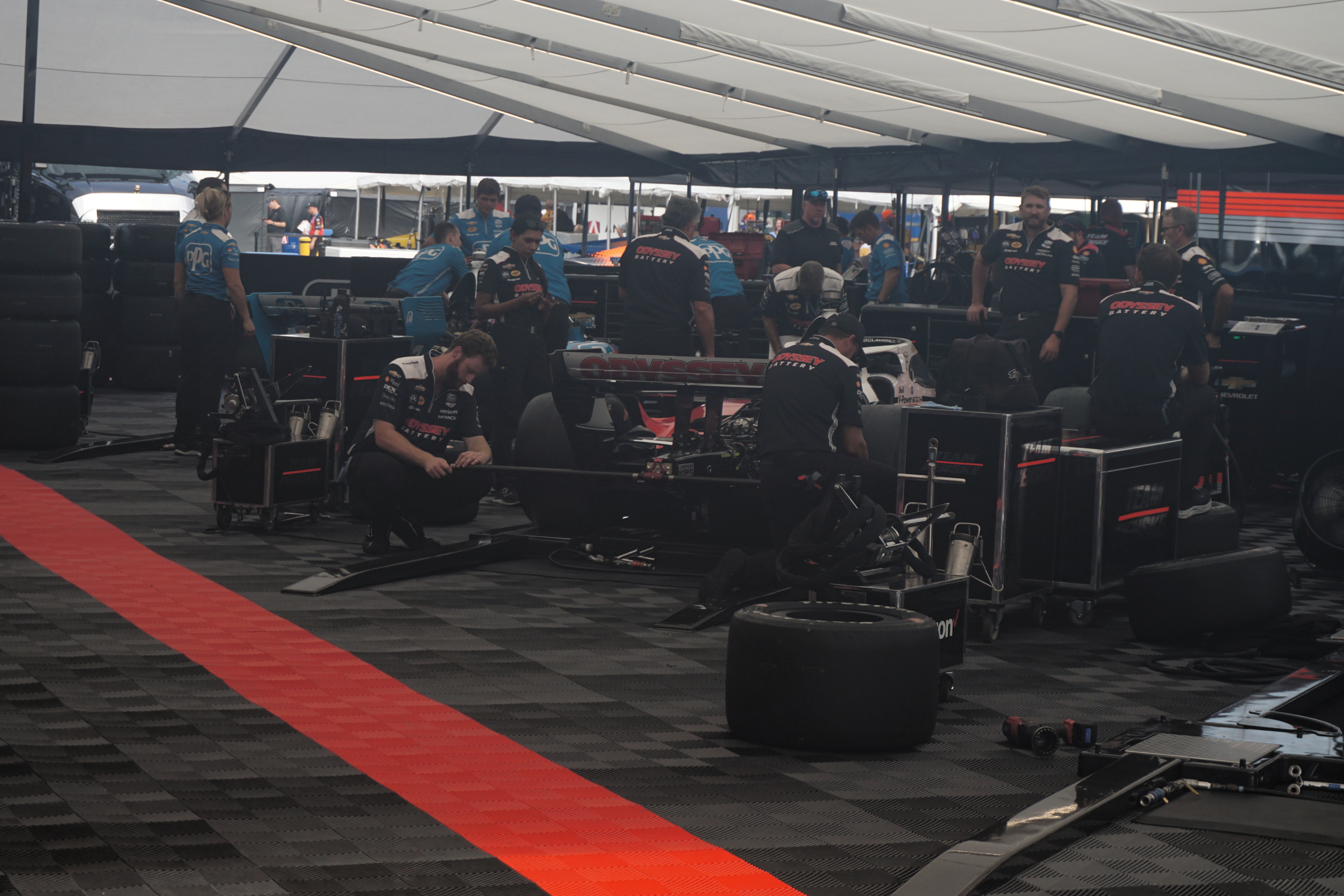
Team Penske garage at the 2024 Hy-Vee Milwaukee Mile 250s

=== 1994 PPG IndyCar World Series ===
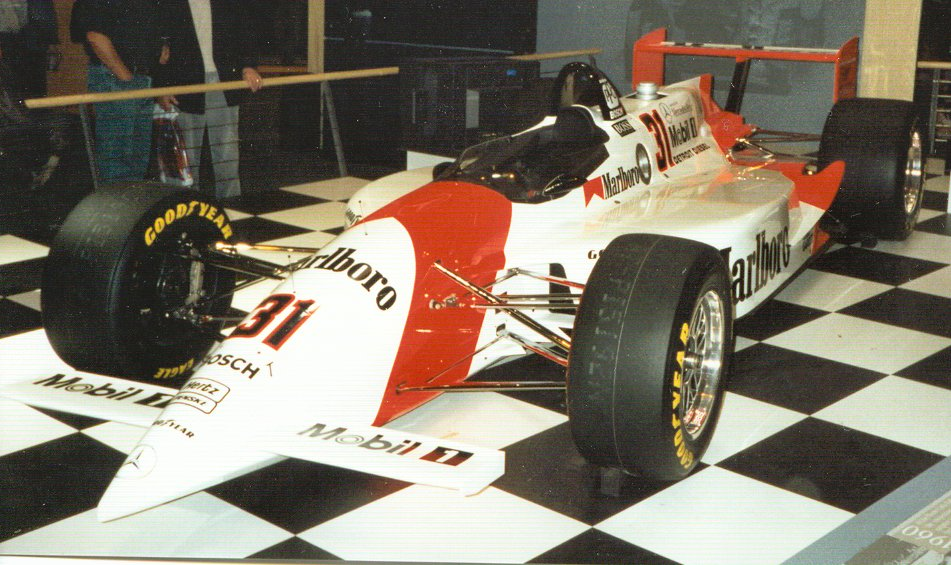
1994 Penske PC-23 Speedway Oval Package. The car displayed was driven by Al Unser Jr.

The 1994 IndyCar World Series Championship marked one of the most dominant performances by any team in the history of American open-wheel racing. Under Roger Penske's leadership, the team not only found the key to winning but also discovered a way to outpace and outclass the competition throughout the season.

Powered by the revolutionary Penske PC-23 chassis paired with the Ilmor-Indy V8 engine, Penske's lineup of Al Unser Jr., Paul Tracy, and Emerson Fittipaldi dominated the field. Across 16 races, the team amassed an incredible 12 wins, 10 pole positions, and 28 podium finishes, asserting near-total control of the championship battle.

The season's defining moment came at the 78th Indianapolis 500, where Penske introduced the radical and controversial Mercedes-Benz 500I engine. Exploiting a loophole in the regulations designed for stock-block pushrod engines - such as the V-6 Buicks - the 500I featured an increased displacement of 650 cm^{3} and an additional 10 inches (4.9 psi/33.8 kPa) of turbo boost. This translated into a power output of at least 900 horsepower, with rumors suggesting it exceeded 1,000 hp, granting Penske an overwhelming advantage in qualifying and race pace.

Penske secured the pole position and the outside front row with their cars, dominated by the efforts of Al Unser Jr. and Emerson Fittipaldi. In the race, the duo controlled the field, with Unser Jr. ultimately taking the win after Fittipaldi clipped the wall exiting Turn 4 with 16 laps remaining, relinquishing the lead. Remarkably, only rookie Jacques Villeneuve finished on the lead lap alongside Unser Jr.

This dominant season saw Team Penske sweep the major titles:

- Drivers' Championship: Al Unser Jr.
- Constructors' Cup: Penske PC-23
- Manufacturers' Cup: Ilmor-Indy V8 engine

However, the following year proved difficult; in 1995, Penske failed to qualify any cars for the Indianapolis 500, marking a surprising downturn after such dominance.

=== Drivers ===
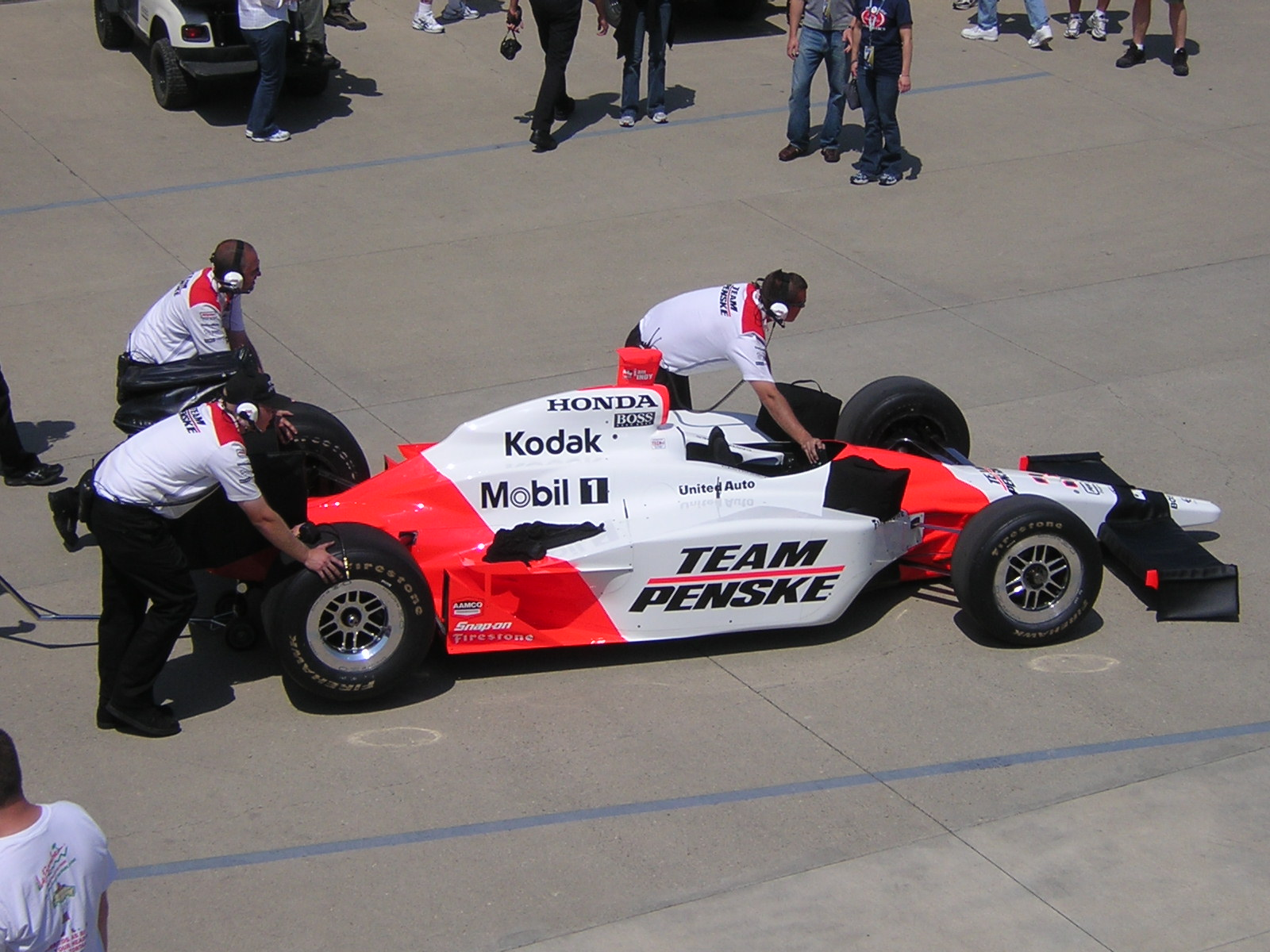
Penske's No. 3 Dallara-Honda at the 2007 Indianapolis 500

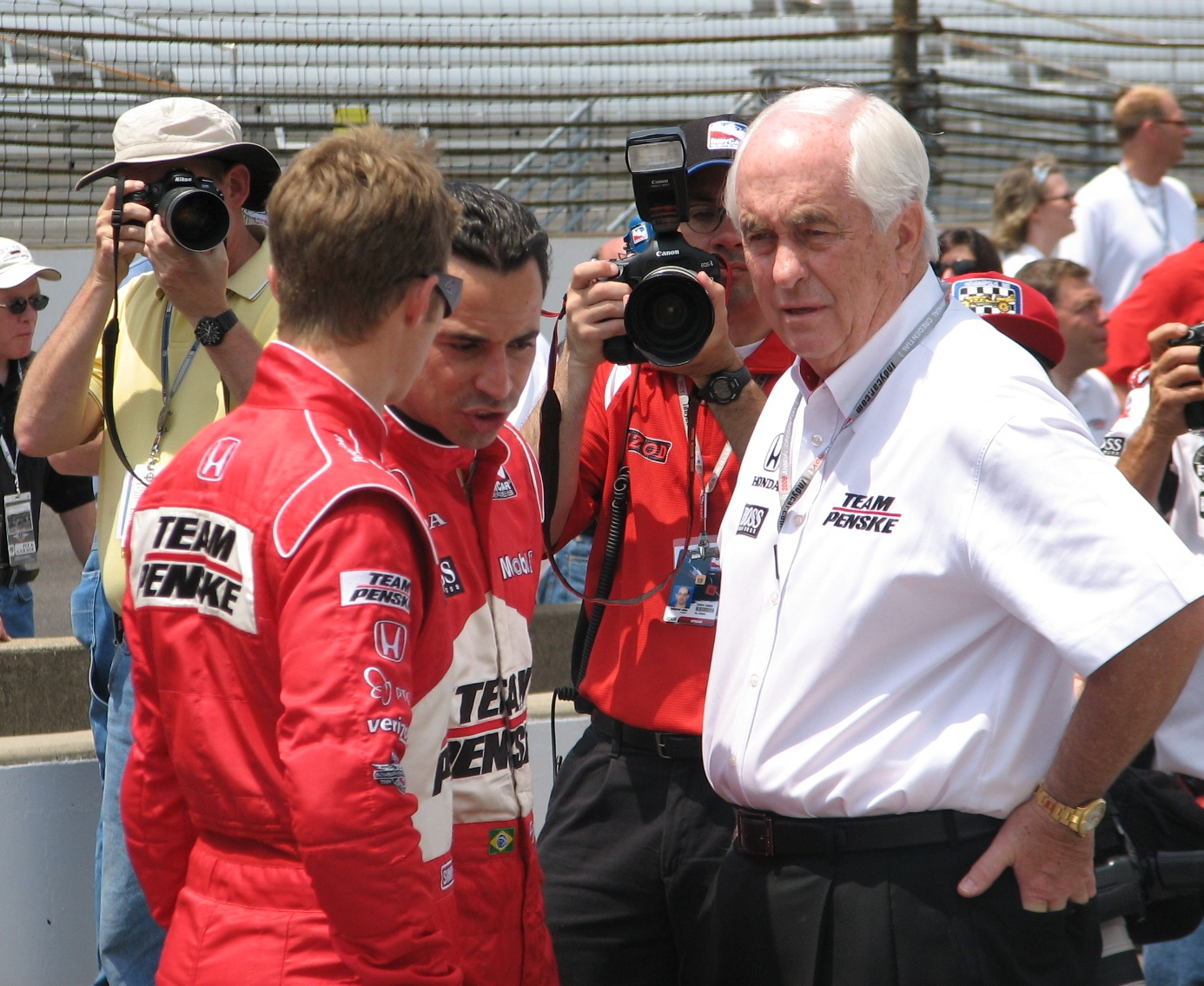
Ryan Briscoe, Hélio Castroneves, and Roger Penske at the Indianapolis Motor Speedway for Miller Lite Carb Day in 2009

- (United States) Mark Donohue (1968–1975)
- (United Kingdom) David Hobbs (1971)
- (United States) Gary Bettenhausen (1972–1974)
- (United States) Gordon Johncock (1972)
- (United States) Mike Hiss (1972, 1974)
- (United States) Bobby Allison (1973, 1975)
- (United States) Tom Sneva (1975–1978)
- (United States) Mario Andretti (1976–1980)
- (United States) Rick Mears (1978–1992)
- (United States) Bobby Unser (1979–1981)
- (United States) Bill Alsup (1981)
- (United States) Kevin Cogan (1982)
- (United States) Al Unser (1983–1989)
- (United States) Johnny Rutherford (1984) (injury replacement)
- (New Zealand) Mike Thackwell (1984) (injury replacement)
- (United States) Danny Sullivan (1985–1990)
- (Australia) Geoff Brabham (1989) (injury replacement)
- (Brazil) Emerson Fittipaldi (1990–1996)
- (Canada) Paul Tracy (1991–1994, 1996–1997)
- (United States) Al Unser Jr. (1994–1999)
- (Denmark) Jan Magnussen (1996) (injury replacement)
- (Brazil) André Ribeiro (1998)
- (United States) Alex Barron (1999, 2003; 2003 as injury replacement)
- (Uruguay) Gonzalo Rodriguez (1999) (killed at Laguna Seca Raceway)
- (Brazil) Tarso Marques (1999) (injury replacement)
- (Brazil) Gil de Ferran (2000–2003)
- (Brazil) Hélio Castroneves (2000–2020)
- (Italy) Max Papis (2002) (injury replacement)
- (United States) Sam Hornish Jr. (2004–2007)
- (Australia) Ryan Briscoe (2008–2012)
- (Australia) Will Power (2009–2025) (legal replacement, 1 race; two other races in No. 12 in 2009, full-time 2010–25)
- (United States) A. J. Allmendinger (2013)
- (Colombia) Juan Pablo Montoya (2014–2017)
- (France) Simon Pagenaud (2015–2021)
- (Spain) Oriol Servia (2016) (injury replacement)
- (United States) Josef Newgarden (2017–present)
- (New Zealand) Scott McLaughlin (2020–present)
- (United States) David Malukas (2026–present)
- Note: This does not include Greg Moore, who in mid-1999 signed a contract with Penske Racing to join the team for the 2000 season. Moore was killed in a crash on Lap 10 of the Marlboro 500 at the Auto Club Speedway in the last race of the 1999 season while in his last race for Forsythe Championship Racing. Castroneves, who had been driving for Hogan Racing, which shut down after the 1999 season, was tapped to fill that seat.

=== Sponsorship ===
Marlboro, the iconic cigarette brand, began its sponsorship of Team Penske at the 1989 Indianapolis 500 and served as the primary sponsor for all Penske IndyCars starting in 1991. This partnership helped define the team's identity through the 1990s and early 2000s.

However, due to the Tobacco Master Settlement Agreement, which restricted cigarette advertising by name, Team Penske announced in late 2005 that Marlboro branding would no longer appear on their cars. Despite this, the cars continued to sport the distinctive Marlboro red and white color scheme, similar to how the Scuderia Ferrari and McLaren Formula 1 teams maintained Marlboro-inspired liveries while removing explicit branding.

By 2007, the IndyCar Series cars displayed only Team Penske insignia, removing Marlboro logos as well as sponsorship mentions from Mobil 1, although the familiar color scheme remained as a visual homage to the long-standing Marlboro partnership.

The formal end of the Marlboro relationship came in 2010, when Philip Morris USA discontinued its association with Team Penske after 19 years. Following this, the team adopted a new black and white livery with red trim, reflecting their new primary sponsor, Verizon Wireless. This updated design resembled the style of the McLaren Formula One team's black-silver livery from 1997 to 2005, which had similarly reflected their Mercedes-Benz engine partnership and West cigarette sponsorship.

== NASCAR ==
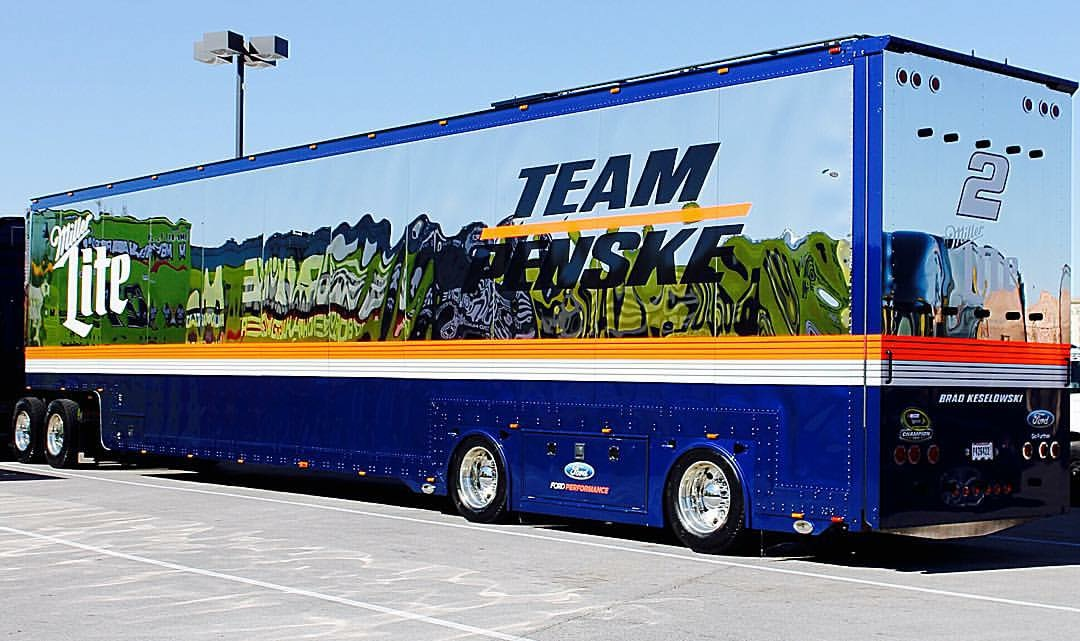
Team Penske No. 2 hauler set for parade down Las Vegas Strip – 2015

== Sports car racing ==
(United States) Team Penske
- Founded: 1965
- Founder(s): Roger Penske
- Team principal(s): TBA
- Current series: FIA World Endurance Championship, IMSA Weathertech Sportscar Championship
- Former series: Rolex Sports Car Series, United States Road Racing Championship, Can-Am, Trans-Am series, American Le Mans Series, WeatherTech SportsCar Championship
- Current drivers: (United States) Dane Cameron (France) Emmanuel Collard (Brazil) Felipe Nasr
- Drivers' Championships: 7 ('06, '07, '08 ALMS, '72, '73 Can-Am, '67, '68 USRRC)

=== Trans-Am Series ===
Team Penske first competed in the Trans-Am Series with a blue Sunoco 1967 Chevrolet Camaro driven by Mark Donohue. This series was designed for "pony cars" like the Ford Mustang. Penske's Camaros won the series championships in 1968 and 1969.

Afterward, Penske switched to a red, white, and blue American Motors-backed 1970 AMC Javelin, and later the restyled 1971 AMC Javelin AMX, which featured aerodynamic improvements like a tail spoiler, developed with Donohue's input. American Motors won the Over 2.5-liter title in 1971 with Penske's involvement.

Following this success, Penske withdrew from the Trans-Am championship. Additionally, Penske Racing had an alliance with Jocko's Racing, a pioneering Trans-Am team that won the 1976 Trans-Am Series championship driving a Penske-leased car.

=== Can-Am Series ===
Penske Racing entered a Lola T70 in the 1966 Can-Am Series for driver Mark Donohue, achieving one victory at Mosport. In 1967, Penske Racing fielded two Lola vehicles, driven by Mark Donohue and George Follmer respectively. In 1968, the team transitioned to the McLaren M6, the reigning series champion from 1967. That year, Donohue secured a win at Bridgehampton. Due to McLaren's dominance in the Can-Am Series, Penske reverted to Lola cars for the 1969 season, although the team participated in only a single race at Mid-Ohio.

Between 1972 and 1974, Penske served as Porsche's official partner in the Can-Am Series. In late 1971, Penske, in collaboration with Mark Donohue, contributed to the development of the turbocharged variant of the Porsche 917. George Follmer won the series in 1972, while Donohue achieved a dominant performance in 1973 with the advanced Porsche 917/30 model. Regulatory changes in 1974 limited Penske's participation to a single race during that season.

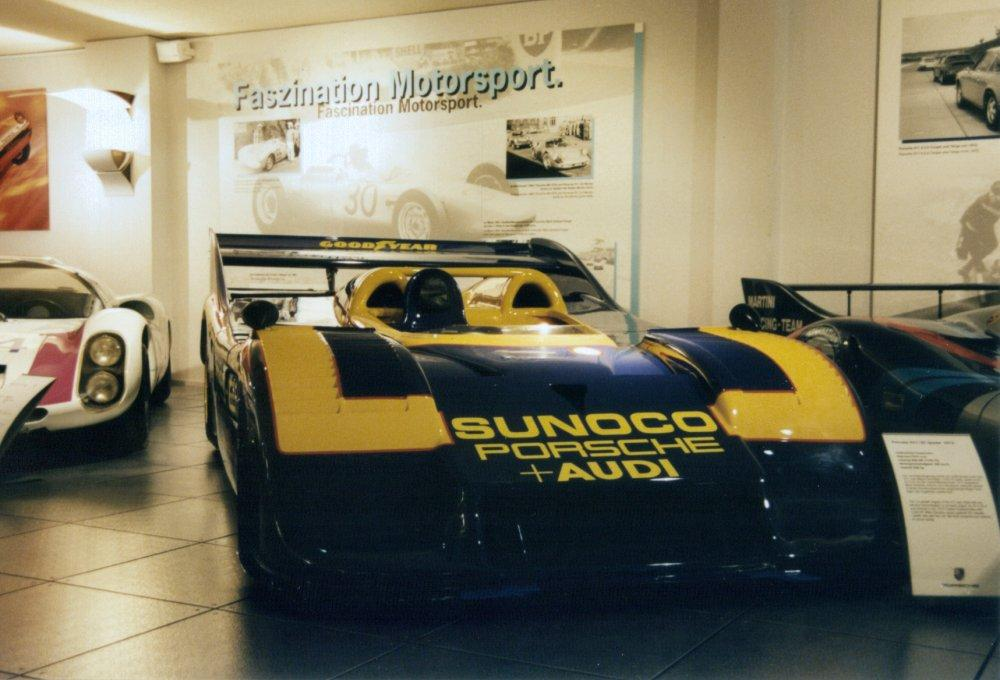
Porsche 917/30, in Stuttgart-Zuffenhausen Museum

=== Endurance racing ===
A Lola T70 Mk IIIb entered by Penske was the surprise winner of the 1969 24 Hours of Daytona.

During the 1970 season, the competition between the 5-liter sportscars of Porsche and Ferrari turned to the advantage of the Porsche 917. In 1971, Ferrari decided to give up any official effort with the 5-liter Ferrari 512. To prepare for the 1972 season, the new works prototype Ferrari 312PB was presented and engaged by the factory in several races.

Roger Penske bought a used 512 M chassis that was dismantled and rebuilt. The car was specially tuned for long races receiving many unique features, among them were a large rear wing and aviation-inspired quick refueling system. The engine was tuned by CanAm V8 specialist Traco, and was probably able to deliver more than 600 hp (450 kW). As of today, it is unknown to what extent Penske's initiative was backed by Ferrari works. This 512M was painted in a blue and yellow livery and was sponsored by Sunoco and the Californian Ferrari dealer Kirk F. White. The car made the pole position for the 1971 24 Hours of Daytona and finished second despite an accident. For the 12 Hours of Sebring the "Sunoco" made the pole again but finished the race at the sixth position after making contact with Pedro Rodrigez's 917. Despite this misfortune, the car had proved to be a serious opponent for the 917. Not only this car was the fastest on track in Daytona and Sebring but it was also the car that had the shortest refueling time.

The presence of the 512 M "Sunoco" forced Porsche to pursue his effort of research and development on the 917: The 917K short tail was modified, and the 917 LH aerodynamics received further improvements. New Magnesium chassis were developed. An entirely new car, the 917/20 was built as a test-bed for future CanAm parts and aerodynamic "low-drag" concepts.

In Le Mans the "Sunoco" Ferrari was unable to break the 200 mph (320 km/h) barrier on the straight while the Porsche 917 LH were lightning-quick at speeds of over 240 mph (380 km/h). Mark Donohue qualified fourth anyway, which was the result of an aerodynamic configuration that favored downforce over drag, which helped in the twistier sections. The car did not have much luck in the race though.

=== American Le Mans Series ===
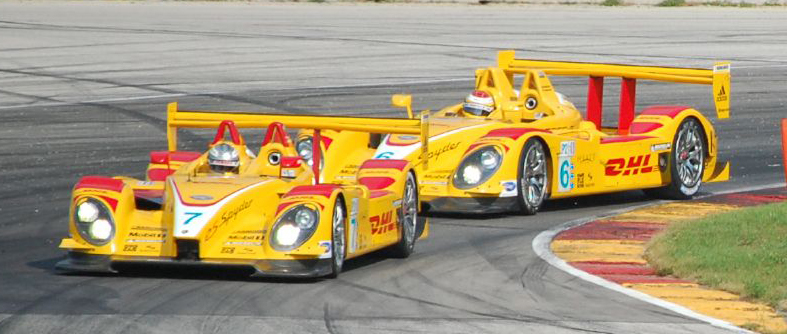
Both of Penske's RS Spyders at the 2007 Generac 500 where they scored an overall victory

In April 2005, it was announced that Porsche would build an Automobile Club de l'Ouest (ACO) sanctioned LMP2 Class Prototype that would be entered by Penske Racing in the American Le Mans Series and thus formally competed as DHL Porsche Penske Racing in a reference of Porsche Motorsport works team. The Porsche RS Spyder made its successful debut at the ALMS season final race at Mazda Raceway Laguna Seca. The "Porsche Junioren" factory drivers Sascha Maassen and Lucas Luhr finished 1st in LMP2 Class and 5th Overall in the 4–Hour Endurance Race. The livery of the Penske Racing American Le Mans Series team was inspired by Jordan EJ12's DHL Formula 1 livery driven by Giancarlo Fisichella and Takuma Sato.

In 2006, Penske Motorsports fielded two LMP2 Porsche RS Spyder in the American Le Mans Series, but did not run the 2006 24 Hours of Le Mans in June. The Penske cars combined to win seven class victories and the overall win at Mid-Ohio. Penske Racing won the LMP2 team championship. Drivers Sascha Maassen and Lucas Luhr tied for first place in the drivers' championship, while Timo Bernhard finished fifth, Romain Dumas finished sixth, and Emmanuel Collard finished tenth.

2006 team lineup:

- LMP2 Porsche RS Spyder No. 6: Sascha Maassen, Lucas Luhr (with Emmanuel Collard for endurance events)
- LMP2 Porsche RS Spyder No. 7: Timo Bernhard, Romain Dumas (with Patrick Long for endurance events)

In 2007, Penske Motorsports fielded two LMP2 Porsche RS Spyder Evo in the American Le Mans Series. Penske Motorsports for the 2nd year in a row did not compete in 2007 24 Hours of Le Mans in June. Penske's two cars combined for eleven class victories and eight overall victories during the twelve race season. Penske won the LMP2 team championship, and team drivers Romain Dumas and Timo Bernhard finished tied for first in the LMP2 drivers' championship, while Sascha Maassen and Ryan Briscoe tied for third place.

2007 team lineup:

- LMP2 Porsche RS Spyder No. 6: Sascha Maassen, Ryan Briscoe (with Emmanuel Collard for endurance events)
- LMP2 Porsche RS Spyder No. 7: Timo Bernhard, Romain Dumas (with Hélio Castroneves (Sebring only) and Patrick Long (Road Atlanta only) for endurance events)

Penske started their 2008 season with an overall win in the 12 Hours of Sebring. This was Porsche's first overall win in the race since 1988 in a Porsche 962.

2008 team lineup:

- LMP2 Porsche RS Spyder No. 5: Hélio Castroneves, Ryan Briscoe (Road Atlanta and Laguna Seca only)
- LMP2 Porsche RS Spyder No. 6: Sascha Maassen, Patrick Long
- LMP2 Porsche RS Spyder No. 7: Timo Bernhard, Romain Dumas (with Emmanuel Collard for endurance events)

=== Grand-Am Rolex Sports Car Series ===
On December 4, 2008, Roger Penske announced that the Team Penske officially shut down its participation in the American Le Mans Series and thus defected to ALMS's rival Grand-Am Rolex Sports Car Series for the full 2009 season. The team utilized a Porsche-powered Riley with Timo Bernhard and Romain Dumas as their official drivers. However, in late 2009, Roger Penske announced that the team would shut down its Grand-Am Rolex Sports Car Series operations and be turned into the new No. 12 Verizon sponsored IndyCar for Will Power to run full-time in 2010.

=== IMSA ===
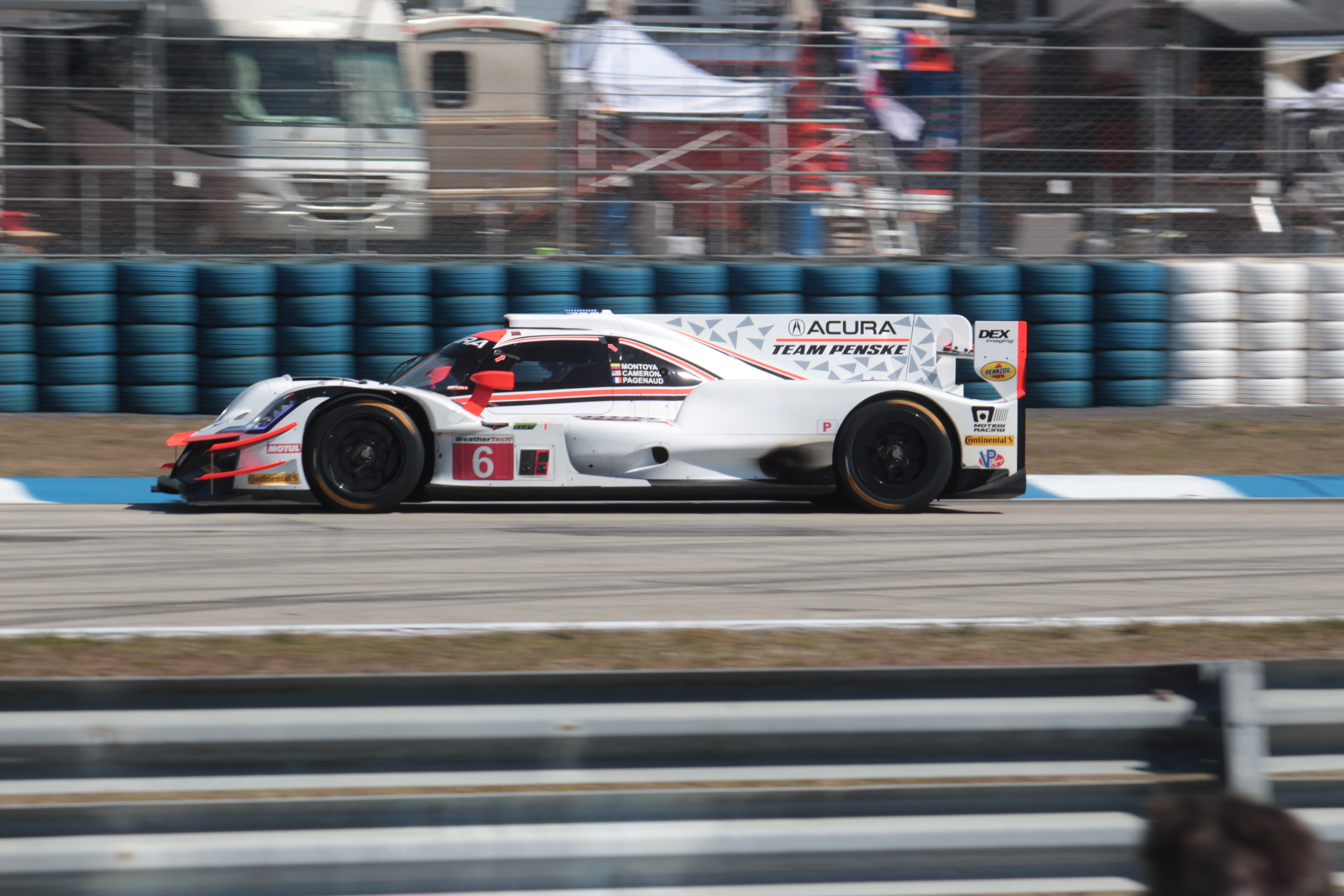
Penske ran the Acura ARX-05 in the DPi class, to some successful results.

In 2017, it was announced that Team Penske would make a comeback to sportscar racing in IMSA's WeatherTech SportsCar Championship in a 3-year partnership with Acura, starting in the 2018 season, running 2 Acura ARX-05 DPis in the prototype (P) class. To prepare their debut in 2018 season, Team Penske took part in the last race of 2017, the Petit Le Mans using the Oreca 07 LMP2 (same framework that the Acura DPi was based on), placing third.

2018 line-up:

- No. 6 Acura ARX-05: Juan Pablo Montoya, Dane Cameron (full season), Simon Pagenaud (endurance)
- No. 7 Acura ARX-05: Hélio Castroneves, Ricky Taylor (full season), Graham Rahal (endurance)

2019–2020 line-up:

- No. 6 Acura ARX-05: Juan Pablo Montoya, Dane Cameron (full season), Simon Pagenaud (endurance)
- No. 7 Acura ARX-05: Hélio Castroneves, Ricky Taylor (full season), Alexander Rossi (endurance)

In 2019 Team Penske won the drivers championship with Juan Pablo Montoya and Dane Cameron, while Hélio Castroneves and Ricky Taylor finished 3rd on the championship. In 2020 Team Penske won again the drivers championship, this time with Hélio Castroneves and Ricky Taylor. In the end of that season Penske left IMSA as the 3-year partnership with Acura reached its end.

Penske would return to Endurance and IMSA in a partnership with Porsche for the new LMDh regulations. For the 2023 season, the team was the only one that fielded the Porsche 963 at the 2023 24 Hours of Daytona. With the No. 6 Porsche retiring due to a gearbox issue and No. 7 finishing in 7th place.

=== Return with Porsche 963 ===
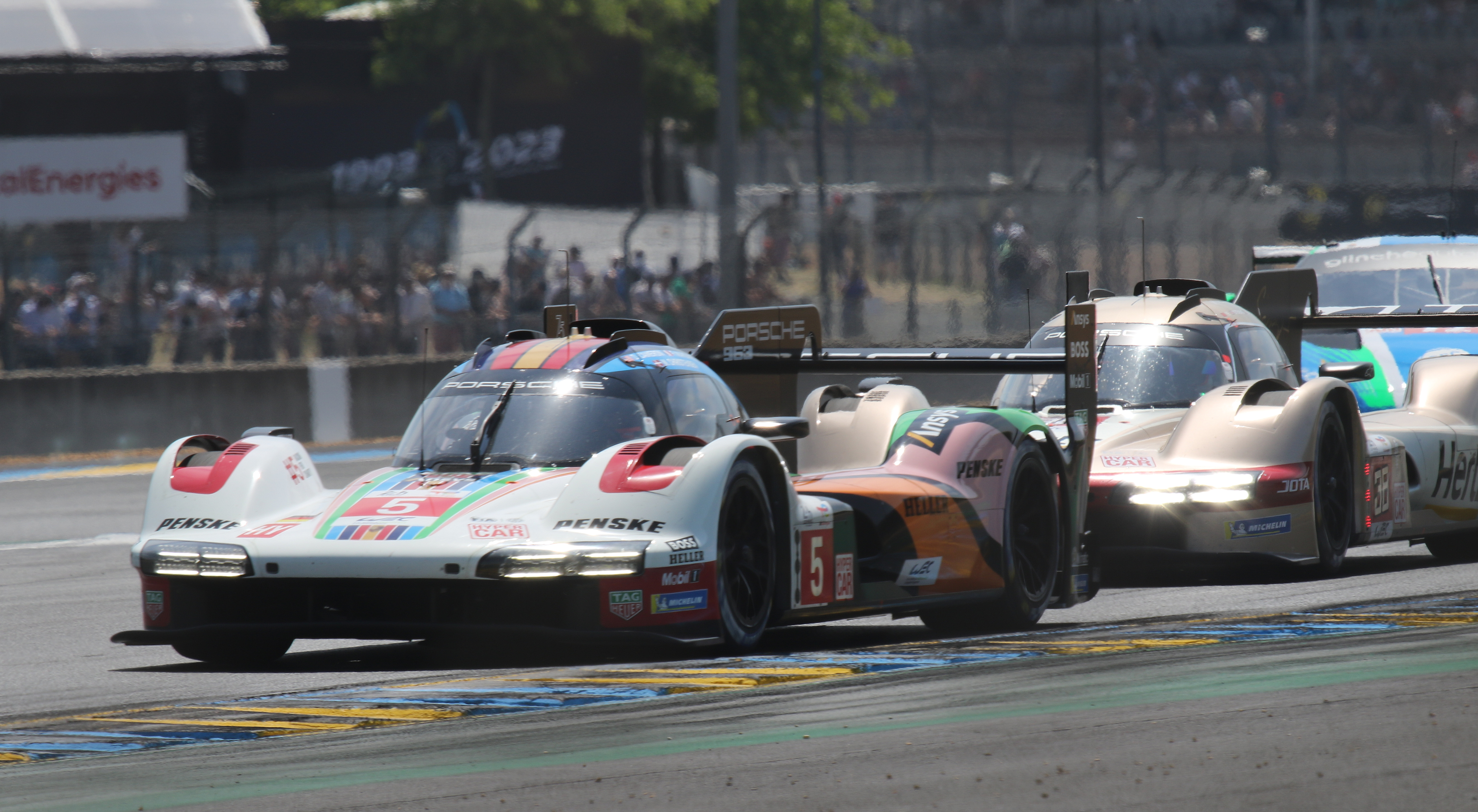
The No. 5 Penske-entered Porsche 963 competing at the 2023 24 Hours of Le Mans

In May 2021 Porsche announced its return to FIA World Endurance Championship new category LMDh with Penske running their factory team. They announced their return to both WEC and IMSA for 2023 season running two new Porsche 963 in each competition. To prepare their return to WEC, Penske took part in WEC 2022 season with one Oreca 07-Gibson in LMP2 class. Former Team Penske lubricant partner and supplier Mobil 1 rejoined as official team's lubricant partner and supplier from 2023 season onwards due to the Porsche partnership.

During FIA World Endurance Championship (WEC) events, Porsche operates with a workforce of more than 80 mechanics, engineers, drivers, and support personnel across its entries. Porsche Penske left the World Endurance Championship series after Porsche exited from the championship after the conclusion of the 2025 season.

2023 line-up:

- WEC No. 5 Porsche 963: Dane Cameron, Michael Christensen, Frédéric Makowiecki
- WEC No. 6 Porsche 963: Kévin Estre, André Lotterer, Laurens Vanthoor
- IMSA No. 6 Porsche 963: Mathieu Jaminet, Nick Tandy (full season), Dane Cameron and Laurens Vanthoor
- IMSA No. 7 Porsche 963: Matt Campbell, Felipe Nasr (full season), Michael Christensen and Josef Newgarden

== Formula One ==
Penske as a Formula One chassis constructor
- Base: Poole, United Kingdom
- Founder(s): Roger Penske

Formula One World Championship career
- Engines: Ford
- Entrants: Penske, F&S Properties, ATS, Interscope Racing
- First entry: 1974 Canadian Grand Prix
- Last entry: 1977 Canadian Grand Prix
- Races entered: 41
- Race victories: 1
- Constructors' Championships: 0
- Drivers' Championships: 0
- Points: 23
- Pole positions: 0
- Fastest laps: 0

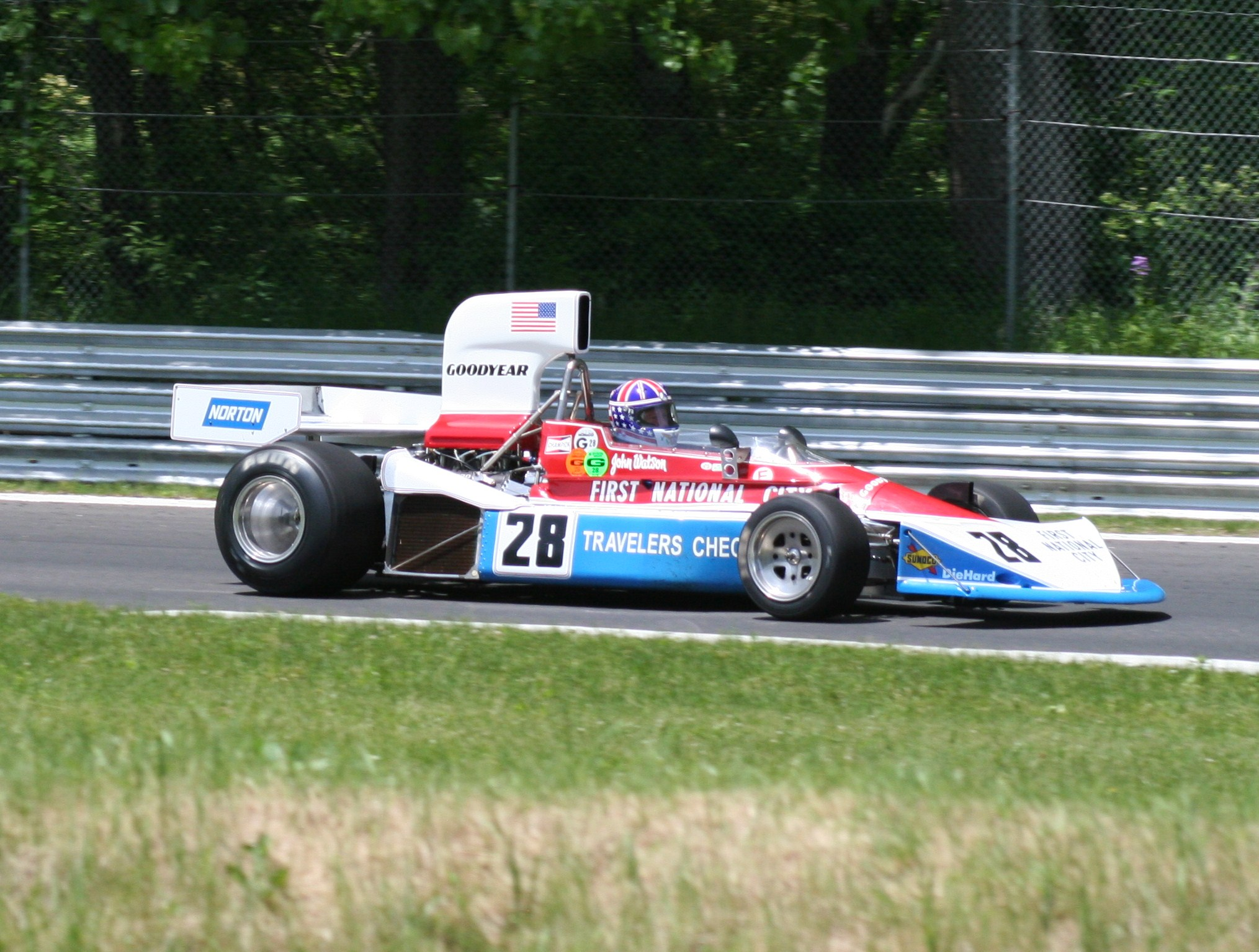
A Penske PC3 being raced in a Historic Grand Prix at the Lime Rock Park circuit in 2009

Penske competed in the Formula One World Championship as a chassis constructor from 1974 to 1977 and as a works team from 1974 to 1976. Although the cars were built at the British base in Poole, the works team held an American licence. At the 1976 Austrian Grand Prix Team Penske achieved their only victory, thus becaming the last American-licensed constructor to win a Formula One race. Excluding the Indianapolis 500, Penske is, along with the All American Racers, one of only two American constructors to have achieved a win in a Formula One race.

In 1971 Penske had sponsored the McLaren car entered in the 1971 Canadian Grand Prix by the White Racing privateer team and in the 1971 United States Grand Prix by the Kirk White privateer team. At the Canadian Grand Prix Mark Donohue took the Penske-sponsored McLaren car to a podium finish. Penske returned three years later, in the 1974 Canadian Grand Prix, with their own works team as well as own chassis, the Penske PC1, a standard tub built around a Cosworth DFV engine and a Hewland gearbox. Donohue took the car to 12th place on its debut.

In 1975, Roger Penske mounted a full season attack with the PC1 car, Donohue managing to score a fifth place in the Swedish Grand Prix. However, the car was retired after the French Grand Prix and Penske entered a March 751 car for the next three races, scoring another fifth in the British Grand Prix. However, Donohue crashed the car in the final practice session of the Austrian Grand Prix at Spielberg and later died from his injuries. Penske missed the Italian Grand Prix, returning only for the United States Grand Prix, abandoning the March 751 car in favor of the PC1 car with Northern Irish driver John Watson.

For the 1976 season, Penske signed a sponsorship deal with Citibank and entered a brand new Penske PC3 car for Watson. Despite a fifth-place score at the South African Grand Prix at Kyalami, the PC3 car was evolved into the PC4 car, which was much more competitive, allowing Watson to score two podiums in France and Britain. Then, in the Austrian Grand Prix, the team scored their only Formula One win. Still, at the end of the year, Penske decided to withdraw from the sport to concentrate solely on Indycar racing, selling the remains of his European operations to Günter Schmid of Germany.

For the 1977 season, the car was entered by Schmid's ATS Wheels business and run by his privateer team ATS Racing Team. The ATS-Penske PC4, now painted yellow, debuted in the United States Grand Prix West with Jean-Pierre Jarier at the wheel, where the Frenchman scored the team's single point of the season. A second PC4 was eventually entered for Hans Heyer (who started the German Grand Prix despite failing to qualify) and Hans Binder (3 races) but the team's fortunes sank and Schmid quit after the Italian Grand Prix, before returning in the 1978 season with his own chassis. A third PC4 car was built by Penske for the Interscope Racing team, who entered the car in the United States and Canadian Grands Prix, driven by American Danny Ongais with no results.

In the 1979 season Penske designed and built the Rebaque HR100 car for wealthy Mexican 'gentleman driver' Héctor Rebaque. The car was entered for the final three races of the season, but either failed to qualify or to finish in each case.

== Supercars Championship ==
In 2015, Team Penske entered the Australian V8 Supercars Championship, having purchased a 51% stake in Dick Johnson Racing in September 2014. The team was known as DJR Team Penske. The team raced a single Ford Falcon FG X in 2015, initially with Marcos Ambrose driving car No. 17 and Scott Pye as a co-driver in the Endurance Cup. Following the Australian Grand Prix support race, Ambrose requested to step aside from driving to let Scott Pye become the main driver from Round 2 at Symmons Plains onwards. Ambrose then became the endurance co-driver in the Endurance Cup.

In October 2015, DJR Team Penske announced a return to a two-car team in 2016 with Fabian Coulthard to drive car No. 12 and Scott Pye in car No. 17. Roger Penske later confirmed that Ambrose elected not to continue as a co-driver in 2016.

For the 2017 season, Scott McLaughlin joined the team and became the new driver for the No. 17 Ford Falcon FG X Supercar. DJR Team Penske took out the 2017 Teams Championship, and in the following year Scott McLaughlin took out the 2018 Drivers Championship in the Australia Supercars Championship. In 2019 he took out his second Drivers Championship winning an Australian Touring Cars/Supercars record of 18 races and with co-driver Alex Premat, Scott McLaughlin won his first Bathurst 1000. In October 2020, Penske sold back its shareholding in DJR Team Penske.

== Indianapolis 500 statistics ==
Team Penske has the most Indianapolis 500 victories of any team in auto-racing history with 20 victories. In 1972, Penske driver Gary Bettenhausen led the most laps but lost an engine with 24 laps to go. His teammate Mark Donohue led the waning laps en route to Penske's first Indianapolis 500 victory. In 1979, Penske driver Bobby Unser led the most laps of the Indianapolis 500 while teammate Rick Mears won the race, from the pole.

Penske's next 500 victory was one of the most controversial finishes in IndyCar history. Penske driver Unser won the pole position and led most of the final 100 laps. On lap 140, Bobby Unser and former Penske driver Mario Andretti came out of the pits. Unser passed 11 cars under a yellow flag while Andretti passed 2 cars. Unser won the race but was stripped of the victory the next morning in favor of Andretti. After a lengthy appeal, Unser was reinstated the victory and was instead fined $40,000 ($104,000 in today's money). Unser retired from racing after the season was over in the fall-out of the controversy.

Penske's next Indy 500 win was with Rick Mears in 1984. Mears and former Penske driver Tom Sneva battled for the lead in the final 100 laps but after Sneva dropped out with a broken CV joint, Mears led the final 40 laps unchallenged to win by 2-laps ahead of the field. The next year, first-year Penske driver Danny Sullivan led the final 61 laps en route to his first Indianapolis 500 victory after winning a 4-lap shootout with Mario Andretti. In 1987, Penske driver Danny Ongais got taken out of the race due to injuries and former Penske driver Al Unser was tabbed as a temporary replacement. Unser won the race.

1988 was one of the most dominating performances by Penske Racing in the history of the Indianapolis 500. Penske's team members, Sullivan, Unser, and Mears qualified in the front row and proceeded to lead 192 of the race's 200 laps, 91 by Sullivan, 89 by Mears, and 12 by Unser. Mears won the race. In 1991, Mears won an 18-lap duel with Michael Andretti to win his 4th Indianapolis 500. Emerson Fittipaldi won the 500 in 1993 but angered American fans by drinking orange juice instead of the traditional milk.

In 1994, the Penske team, consisting of Al Unser Jr., Paul Tracy and Emerson Fittipaldi led 193 of the race's 200 laps, thanks to a new engine invented by Penske that went up to 1000 horsepower. The engine was later banned, which resulted in Penske Racing not qualifying a single car in the 1995 Indianapolis 500.

Due to the open-wheel split, Penske did not field a car at the Indianapolis 500 from 1996 to 2000. In 2001, Penske Racing crossed a picket-line by fielding the team in the 500, consisting of rookie Hélio Castroneves and Gil de Ferran. The duo proceeded to lead the most laps, en route to the victory, giving Penske Racing a 1-2 finish, the first time in the team's history. In a post-race interview, Roger Penske said that after the heartbreak in 1995, the win was the biggest of all his Indy 500 wins.

In 2002, Castroneves barely beat Paul Tracy to win his second consecutive Indy 500. Controversy overshadowed the race when videotapes appeared to have shown that Tracy was ahead of Castroneves at the moment of a final-lap caution. After a lengthy appeal, Castroneves' win was upheld on July 2. In 2003, Gil de Ferran won his first 500 and then retired when the season was over. Penske Racing has since proceeded to win the 500 in 2006, 2009, 2015, 2018, 2019, 2023, and 2024

== Penske Racing Museum ==
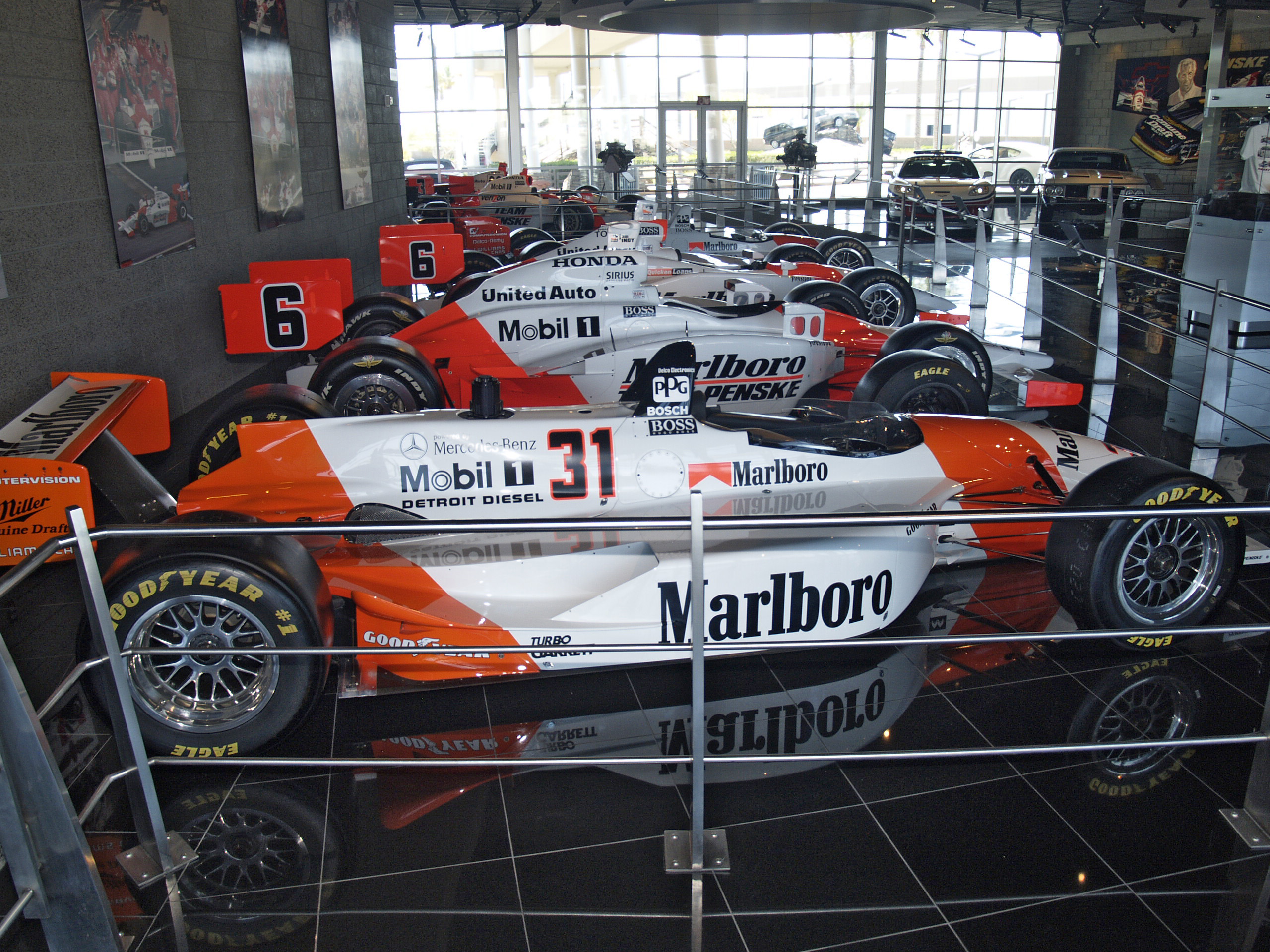
Penske and Dallara Indy cars on display at the Penske Racing Museum in Scottsdale, Arizona

Opened in 2002, the Penske Racing Museum in Scottsdale, Arizona, is located within a complex of Penske Automotive Group car dealerships at the Scottsdale 101 Auto Collection. The two-story, 9,000-square-foot (840 m^{2}) museum houses approximately 20 historically significant Penske Racing cars, along with trophies, artwork, engines, and other memorabilia dating from Penske Racing's earliest origins up to the present day. Displays are rotated regularly, but the museum focuses primarily on the team's successes in the Indy 500 and NASCAR, with lesser emphasis on F1 and sports car racing.

== Racing results ==
=== USAC Championship Car results ===
(key) (Results in bold indicate pole position; results in italics indicate fastest lap)

Year	Chassis	Engine	Drivers	No.	1	2	3	4	5	6	7	8	9	10	11	12	13	14	15	16	17	18	19	20	21	22	23	24	25	26	27	28
1968					HAN1	LVG	PHX1	TRE1	INDY	MIL1	MOS		LAN1	PIP	CDR	NAZ	IRP		LAN2		MTR		SPR	MIL2	DQSF	ISF	TRE2	SAC	MIC	HAN2	PHX2	RIV
1968	Eagle 68	Offy 159 tc	(United States) Mark Donohue	12							6	4																				21
1969					PHX1	HAN	INDY	MIL1	LAN	PIP	CDR	NAZ	TRE1	IRP		MIL2	SPR	DDIS	DQSF	ISF	BRN		TRE2	SAC	KEN		PHX2	RIV				
1969	Lola T152 4WD	Offy 159 tc	(United States) Mark Donohue	66			7							DNQ							7	4			16			21				
1970					PHX1	SON	TRE1	INDY	MIL1	LAN	CDR	MIC	IRP	SPR	MIL2	ONT	DQSF	ISF	SED	TRE2	SAC	PHX2										
1970	Lola T154	Chevy V8	(United States) Mark Donohue	68		**25**							2																			
1970	Lola T154	Ford DOHC tc	(United States) Mark Donohue	68				2								30																
1971					RAF		PHX1	TRE1	INDY	MIL1	POC	MIC	MIL2	ONT	TRE2	PHX2																
1971	Lola T153	Ford DOHC tc	(United States) Mark Donohue	68			6	19																								
1971	Lola T153	Ford DOHC tc	(United Kingdom) David Hobbs	68					20																							
1971	McLaren M16A	Offy 159 tc	(United States) Mark Donohue	66					25		**1**	1		**18**	6	16																
1972					PHX	TRE	INDY	MIL	MIC	POC	MIL	ONT	TRE	PHX																		
1972	McLaren M16A/B	Offy 159 tc	(United States) Gary Bettenhausen	7	4	1	14	3	24	19																						
1972	McLaren M16A/B	Offy 159 tc	(United States) Gordon Johncock	7							22																					
1972	McLaren M16A/B	Offy 159 tc	(United States) Mark Donohue	66	17	19	1	2					2	**16**																		
1972	McLaren M16A/B	Offy 159 tc	(United States) Mike Hiss	66								2																				
1973					TXS	TRE		INDY	MIL	POC	MIC	MIL	ONT			MIC		TRE	TXS	PHX												
1973	McLaren M16C	Offy Drake tc	(United States) Gary Bettenhausen	5	2	6	17	5	3	27	24	20		2	19	2	**8**	24	1													
1973	Eagle 72	Offy 159 tc	(United States) Gary Bettenhausen	5																6												
1973	McLaren M16C	Offy Drake tc	(United States) Bobby Allison	12				32																								
1973	Eagle 72	Offy 159 tc	(United States) Mark Donohue	66				15		17					29																	
1973	McLaren M16B	Offy 159 tc	(United States) Al Loquasto (R)	86				DNQ																								
1974					ONT			PHX1	TRE1	INDY	MIL1	POC	MIC1	MIL2	MIC2	TRE2	TRE3	PHX2														
1974	McLaren M16C	Offy Drake tc	(United States) Gary Bettenhausen	8		11	20		DNQ	32	2	31																				
1974	Eagle 72	Offy 159 tc	(United States) Gary Bettenhausen	8				14																								
1974	McLaren M16C	Offy Drake tc	(United States) Mike Hiss	8									7																			
1974	McLaren M16C	Offy Drake tc	(United States) Mike Hiss	68			31			14					4																	
1975					ONT			PHX1	TRE1	INDY	MIL1	POC	MIC1	MIL2	MIC2	TRE2	PHX2															
1975	McLaren M16C/D	Offy Drake tc	(United States) Bobby Allison	16		6	32			25		27	17																			
1975	McLaren M16C/D	Offy Drake tc	(United States) Tom Sneva	68	9		6	7	**6**	22		29	2	3	1	13	2															
1976					PHX1	TRE1	INDY	MIL1	POC	MIC1	TXS1	TRE2	MIL2	ONT	MIC2	TXS2	PHX2															
1976	McLaren M16C/D	Offy Drake tc	(United States) Mario Andretti	6			8		5																							
1976	McLaren M16C/D	Offy Drake tc	(United States) Mario Andretti	68												4	3															
1976	McLaren M16C/D	Offy Drake tc	(United States) Tom Sneva	68	17	3	6	13	7	6	16	3	13	26	5																	
1977					ONT1	PHX1	TXS1	TRE	INDY	MIL1	POC	MOS	MIC1	TXS2	MIL2	ONT2	MIC2	PHX2														
1977	McLaren M24	Cosworth DFX	(United States) Tom Sneva	8	14	16	1	10	**2**	2	1	3			18																	
1977	Penske PC5/77	Cosworth DFX	(United States) Tom Sneva	8									**4**	5		3	10	17														
1977	McLaren M24	Cosworth DFX	(United States) Mario Andretti	9		DNQ		16	26		2					4		4														
1977	Penske PC5/77	Cosworth DFX	(United States) Mario Andretti	9													20															
1978					PHX1	ONT1	TXS1	TRE1	INDY	MOS	MIL1	POC	MIC1	ATL	TXS2	MIL2	ONT2	MIC2	TRE2	SIL	BRH	PHX2										
1978	Penske PC-6/78	Cosworth DFX	(United States) Tom Sneva	1	22	**2**	2	**3**	**2**	4	15	3	**2**	**8**	**5**	15	**23**	2	3	3	2	16										
1978	Penske PC-6/78	Cosworth DFX	(United States) Mario Andretti	7	DNS	15	5	13	12			23					DNS	20	1			7										
1978	Penske PC-6/78	Cosworth DFX	(United States) Mike Hiss	7					Rpl^{1}																							
1978	Penske PC-6/78	Cosworth DFX	(United States) Rick Mears	7	5					2	1		22	1	9	2	9			2	1											
1978	Penske PC-6/78	Cosworth DFX	(United States) Rick Mears	71					23																							
1978	Penske PC-6/78	Cosworth DFX	(United States) George Snider	71											DNS																	

- ^{1} Mike Hiss was hired by Penske to qualify Mario Andretti's #7 car for the 1978 Indianapolis 500 while Andretti was racing in Formula One; Andretti would then drive the car on race-day.

=== Championship Auto Racing Teams (CART) results ===
(key)

Year	Chassis	Engine	Drivers	No.	1	2	3	4	5	6	7	8	9	10	11	12	13	14	15	16	17	18	19	20	21	Pts Pos	Pos
1979					PHX	ATL		INDY	TRT		MCH		WGL	TRT	ONT	MCH	ATL	PHX									
1979	Penske PC-6/7	Cosworth DFX	(United States) Rick Mears	9	2	5	2	**1**	5	7	4	5	2	1	**2**	3	1	3								1st	4,060
1979	Penske PC-7	Cosworth DFX	(United States) Bobby Unser	12	**5**	7	4	5	1	**1**	**19**	1	1	**2**	1	**1**	**3**	**2**								2nd	3,820
1979	Penske PC-7	Cosworth DFX	(United States) Bill Alsup **(R)**	68				DNQ																		15th	400
1979	Penske PC-7	Cosworth DFX	(United States) Mario Andretti	99											3	DNQ										11th	700
1980					ONT	INDY	MIL	POC	MOH	MCH	WGL	MIL	ONT	MCH	MXC	PHX											
1980	Penske PC-7/9	Cosworth DFX	(United States) Rick Mears	1	21	5	5	12	9	4	2	2	3	3	1	7										4th	2,866
1980	Penske PC-9	Cosworth DFX	(United States) Bobby Unser	11	23	19	1	**1**	15	**2**	1	3	**1**	2	**2**	DNQ										2nd	3,714
1980	Penske PC-9	Cosworth DFX	(United States) Mario Andretti	12		20		17						**1**		**2**										16th	580
1980	Penske PC-7	Cosworth DFX	(United States) Tom Gloy	61					6				5	9												14th	680
1981					PHX	MIL	ATL		MCH	RIV	MIL	MCH	WGL	MXC	PHX												
1981	Penske PC-9B	Cosworth DFX	(United States) Bobby Unser	3	**2**	21	13	6	16	9	3	7	17	**15***	**2**											7th	99
1981	Penske PC-9B	Cosworth DFX	(United States) Rick Mears	6	4		1	**1***	3	1*	2	**1**	1	1	8											1st	304
1981	Penske PC-9B	Cosworth DFX	(United States) Bill Alsup	7			8	8	4	3	11	4		5	17											2nd	175
1982					PHX	ATL	MIL	CLE	MCH	MIL	POC	RIV	ROA	MCH	PHX												
1982	Penske PC-10	Cosworth DFX	(United States) Rick Mears	1	**1***	**1***	3	4	**15***	**12***	**1***	1*	**5**	**25**	**2**											1st	294
1982	Penske PC-10	Cosworth DFX	(United States) Kevin Cogan	4	3	18	5	**10***	14	5	2	**10**	25	22	4											6th	136
1983					ATL	INDY	MIL	CLE	MCH	ROA	POC	RIV	MOH	MCH	CPL	LAG	PHX										
1983	Penske PC-11/10B	Cosworth DFX	(United States) Rick Mears	1	**8***		3	7	4	17	3	19	9	1*	13	21	17									6th	92
1983	Penske PC-11/10B	Cosworth DFX	(United States) Rick Mears	2		3																				6th	92
1983	Penske PC-11/10B	Cosworth DFX	(United States) Al Unser	7	2	2	2	1*	2	3	11	11	4	5	4	11	4									1st	151
1984					LBH	PHX	INDY	MIL	POR	MEA	CLE	MCH	ROA	POC	MOH	SAN	MCH	PHX	LAG	CPL							
1984	Penske PC-12; March 84C	Cosworth DFX	(United States) Al Unser	1	22	21		5	27	8	10	30	3	8	8	13	4	17	6	14						9th	76
1984	Penske PC-12; March 84C	Cosworth DFX	(United States) Al Unser	2			3																			9th	76
1984	Penske PC-12; March 84C	Cosworth DFX	(United States) Rick Mears	6	21	18	1*	**2**	10	10	4	3	4	2	**5***	DNQ										4th	110
1984	March 84C	Cosworth DFX	(United States) Johnny Rutherford	6												5	**14***	11								22nd	20
1984	March 84C	Cosworth DFX	(New Zealand) Mike Thackwell	6															18	20						40th	0
1985					LBH	INDY	MIL	POR	MEA	CLE	MCH	ROA	POC	MOH	SAN	MCH	LAG	PHX	MIA								
1985	March 85C	Cosworth DFX	(United States) Danny Sullivan	4	3		4	**27**	18	27	14	**13**	5	2	5	8	8	4	1							4th	126
1985	March 85C	Cosworth DFX	(United States) Danny Sullivan	5		1																				4th	126
1985	March 85C	Cosworth DFX	(United States) Rick Mears	1		21																				10th	51
1985	March 85C	Cosworth DFX	(United States) Rick Mears	5			3				**30**		**1**			2										10th	51
1985	March 85C	Cosworth DFX	(United States) Al Unser	5	5			4	3	3		7		27	13*		2	**1***	4							1st	151
1985	March 85C	Cosworth DFX	(United States) Al Unser	11		4					2*		3			12										1st	151
1986					PHX	LBH	INDY	MIL	POR	MEA	CLE	TOR	MCH	POC	MOH	SAN	MCH	ROA	LAG	PHX	MIA						
1986	March 86C	Chevrolet 265A; Cosworth DFX	(United States) Rick Mears	1	19			3	16		4	8	**12**	8	17		**8**	3		20						8th	89
1986	Penske PC-15	Chevrolet 265A; Cosworth DFX	(United States) Rick Mears	1		20				19						**18**			17		3					8th	89
1986	March 86C	Chevrolet 265A; Cosworth DFX	(United States) Rick Mears	4			**3***																			8th	89
1986	March 86C	Chevrolet 265A; Cosworth DFX	(United States) Danny Sullivan	4	4	**11**		11	11	1	**1***	2	25	16	3*	5	12	6	2	2						3rd	147
1986	Penske PC-15	Chevrolet 265A; Cosworth DFX	(United States) Danny Sullivan	4																	26					3rd	147
1986	March 86C	Chevrolet 265A; Cosworth DFX	(United States) Danny Sullivan	1			9																			3rd	147
1986	March 86C	Chevrolet 265A	(United States) Al Unser	11									14	20							15					41st	0
1986	Penske PC-15	Chevrolet 265A	(United States) Al Unser	11	18		22																			41st	0
1987					LBH	PHX	INDY	MIL	POR	MEA	CLE	TOR	MCH	POC	ROA	MOH	NAZ	LAG	MIA								
1987	Penske PC-16	Chevrolet 265A	(United States) Danny Sullivan	3	22	11		11	11																	9th	87
1987	March 86C	Chevrolet 265A	(United States) Danny Sullivan	3			13			20	4	2	4	17	5	3	22	2	12							9th	87
1987	Penske PC-16	Chevrolet 265A	(United States) Rick Mears	8	9	20		21	3	18	7															5th	102
1987	March 86C	Chevrolet 265A	(United States) Rick Mears	8			23					10	21	1*	9	4	3	3	5							5th	102
1987	March 86C	Chevrolet 265A	(United States) Danny Ongais	25			Inj																			42nd	0
1987	March 86C	Cosworth DFX	(United States) Al Unser	25			1																			13th	39
1987	March 86C	Cosworth DFX	(United States) Al Unser	6									2	15												13th	39
1987	Penske PC-16	Chevrolet 265A	(United States) Al Unser	9															DNQ							13th	39
1988					PHX	LBH	INDY	MIL	POR	CLE	TOR	MEA	MCH	POC	MOH	ROA	NAZ	LAG	MIA								
1988	Penske PC-17	Chevrolet 265A	(United States) Rick Mears	5	**22**	8	**1**	1	6	23	6	3	**13**	**23**	3	12	7	5	2							4th	129
1988	Penske PC-17	Chevrolet 265A	(United States) Danny Sullivan	9	23	**13**	23*	2	**1**	**3**	**2**	4	1	18	**5**	**4**	**1**	**1**	**5**							1st	182
1988	Penske PC-17	Chevrolet 265A	(United States) Al Unser	1			3																			19th	23
1988	Penske PC-17	Chevrolet 265A	(United States) Al Unser	60									9	13												19th	23
1989					PHX	LBH	INDY	MIL	DET	POR	CLE	MEA	TOR	MCH	POC	MOH	ROA	NAZ	LAG								
1989	Penske PC-18	Chevrolet 265A	(United States) Danny Sullivan	1	3	8	28	10	24			8	3*	23	1	5	**1**	3	14							7th	107
1989	Penske PC-18	Chevrolet 265A	(Australia) Geoff Brabham	1						14																39th	0
1989	Penske PC-18	Chevrolet 265A	(United States) Al Unser	1							10															16th	14
1989	Penske PC-18	Chevrolet 265A	(United States) Al Unser	25			24							8	7											16th	14
1989	Penske PC-18	Chevrolet 265A	(United States) Rick Mears	4	**1**	5	**23**	**1**	5	8	5	4	5	7	2	6	3	**2**	**1**							2nd	186
1990					PHX	LBH	INDY	MIL	DET	POR	CLE	MEA	TOR	MCH	DEN	VAN	MOH	ROA	NAZ	LAG							
1990	Penske PC-19	Chevrolet 265A	(Brazil) Emerson Fittipaldi	1	5	2	**3**	3	7	9	3	6	20	**17**	18	6	12	2	1	6						5th	144
1990	Penske PC-19	Chevrolet 265A	(United States) Rick Mears	2	**1**	6	5	**2**	4	5	**8**	2	12	14	7	4	7	3	2	4						3rd	168
1990	Penske PC-19	Chevrolet 265A	(United States) Danny Sullivan	7	6	3	32	8	14	**4**	1	14	**4**	21	2	2	5	**16**	18	**1**						6th	139
1991					SFR	LBH	PHX	INDY	MIL	DET	POR	CLE	MEA	TOR	MCH	DEN	VAN	MOH	ROA	NAZ	LAG						
1991	Penske PC-20	Chevrolet 265A	(United States) Rick Mears	3	3	4	**5**	**1**	**15**	5	6	17	**3**	20	**1**	8	6	6	15	**15**	5					4th	145
1991	Penske PC-20	Chevrolet 265A	(Brazil) Emerson Fittipaldi	5	19	17	3	11	8	1	**2**	**2**	7	21	20	2	17	2	6	8	4					5th	140
1991	Penske PC-19	Chevrolet 265A	(Canada) Paul Tracy **(R)**	17											21					7	25					21st	6
1992					SFR	PHX	LBH	INDY	DET	POR	MIL	NHA	TOR	MCH	CLE	ROA	VAN	MOH	NAZ	LAG							
1992	Penske PC-21	Chevrolet 265B	(Brazil) Emerson Fittipaldi	5	1	3	3	24	8	**2**	4	21	19	13	**1***	1*	19	1	7	19						4th	151
1992	Penske PC-21	Chevrolet 265B	(United States) Al Unser	4															12							16th	15
1992	Penske PC-21	Chevrolet 265B	(United States) Rick Mears	4	2	8	6	26		7	16	4		16												13th	47
1992	Penske PC-21	Chevrolet 265B	(Canada) Paul Tracy	4					16				21		19	**17**	23			16						12th	59
1992	Penske PC-20	Chevrolet 265A	(Canada) Paul Tracy	7		4		20						2				2	3							12th	59
1993					SFR	PHX	LBH	INDY	MIL	DET	POR	CLE	TOR	MCH	NHA	ROA	VAN	MOH	NAZ	LAG							
1993	Penske PC-22	Chevrolet 265C	(Brazil) Emerson Fittipaldi	4	2	14	13	1	3	23	1	2	**2**	13	3	5	7	1	5	**2**						2nd	183
1993	Penske PC-22	Chevrolet 265C	(Canada) Paul Tracy	12	21	16	1	30	20	9	3	**1**	1	19	2	**1**	13	25	3	1						3rd	157
1994					SFR	PHX	LBH	INDY	MIL	DET	POR	CLE	TOR	MCH	MOH	NHA	VAN	ROA	NAZ	LAG							
1994	Penske PC-23	Ilmor 265D	(Brazil) Emerson Fittipaldi	2	2	1*	21		2	2	2	20	3	10	3	**3***	9	3	**3**	4						2nd	178
1994	Penske PC-23	Mercedes-Benz 500I	(Brazil) Emerson Fittipaldi	2				17*																		2nd	178
1994	Penske PC-23	Ilmor 265D	(Canada) Paul Tracy	3	16	**23**	**20**		3	1	3	3	5	16	2*	2	20	**18***	1*	**1***						3rd	152
1994	Penske PC-23	Mercedes-Benz 500I	(Canada) Paul Tracy	3				23																		3rd	152
1994	Penske PC-23	Ilmor 265D	(United States) Al Unser Jr.	31	14	2	1*		1*	10*	**1***	**1***	29	8	**1**	1	1	2	2	20						1st	225
1994	Penske PC-23	Mercedes-Benz 500I	(United States) Al Unser Jr.	31				**1**																		1st	225
1995					MIA	SFR	PHX	LBH	NAZ	INDY	MIL	DET	POR	ROA	TOR	CLE	MCH	MOH	NHA	VAN	LAG						
1995	Penske PC-24	Mercedes-Benz IC108B	(United States) Al Unser Jr.	1	15	6	8	1*	13	DNQ	2*	5	1*	28	26	18	2	1	3	1*	6					2nd	161
1995	Lola T95/00	Mercedes-Benz IC108B	(United States) Al Unser Jr.	11						DNQ																2nd	161
1995	Reynard 94i	Mercedes-Benz IC108B	(United States) Al Unser Jr.	21						DNQ																2nd	161
1995	Penske PC-24	Mercedes-Benz IC108B	(Brazil) Emerson Fittipaldi	2	24	18	3*	20	1	DNQ	23	10	21	15	10	25	5	21	5	7	16					11th	67
1995	Lola T95/00	Mercedes-Benz IC108B	(Brazil) Emerson Fittipaldi	9						DNQ																11th	67
1995	Penske PC-23	Mercedes-Benz IC108B	(Brazil) Emerson Fittipaldi	89						DNQ																11th	67
1996					MIA	RIO	SFR	LBH	NAZ	500	MIL	DET	POR	CLE	TOR	MCH	MOH	ROA	VAN	LAG							
1996	Penske PC-25	Mercedes-Benz IC108C	(United States) Al Unser Jr.	2	8	2	9	3	3	8	2*	22	4	4	13	4	13	10*	5	16						4th	125
1996	Penske PC-25	Mercedes-Benz IC108C	(Canada) Paul Tracy	3	**23***	19	22	4	**5**	7	**3**	17	27	9	5	DNS		12	18	29						13th	60
1996	Penske PC-25	Mercedes-Benz IC108C	(Denmark) Jan Magnussen **(R)**	3													14									24th	5
1997					MIA	SFR	LBH	NAZ	RIO	GAT	MIL	DET	POR	CLE	TOR	MCH	MOH	ROA	VAN	LAG	FON						
1997	Penske PC-26	Mercedes-Benz IC108D	(United States) Al Unser Jr.	2	27	27	4	3	7	18	20	8	25	4	20	20	22	7	5	11	22					13th	67
1997	Penske PC-26	Mercedes-Benz IC108D	(Canada) Paul Tracy	3	2	19*	7	**1***	1	1	**6**	Wth	7	7	10	4	27	28	28	26	26					5th	121
1998					MIA	MOT	LBH	NAZ	RIO	GAT	MIL	DET	POR	CLE	TOR	MCH	MOH	ROA	VAN	LAG	HOU	SFR	FON				
1998	Penske PC-27	Mercedes-Benz IC108E	(United States) Al Unser Jr.	2	22	2	29	15	16	19	3	24	5	17	17	22	6	27	5	6	7	22	27			11th	72
1998	Penske PC-27	Mercedes-Benz IC108E	(Brazil) Andre Ribeiro	3	17	9	22	DNS	22	20	18	16	15	22	23	28	10	25	7	14	17	13	28			22nd	13
1999					MIA	MOT	LBH	NAZ	RIO	GAT	MIL	POR	CLE	ROA	TOR	MCH	DET	MOH	CHI	VAN	LAG	HOU	SRF	FON			
1999	Penske PC-27B	Mercedes-Benz IC108E	(United States) Al Unser Jr.	2	26			24	12							13						15	22	7		21st	26
1999	Lola B99/00	Mercedes-Benz IC108E	(United States) Al Unser Jr.	2						12	19	16	5	9	9		15	25	25	25	Wth					21st	26
1999	Penske PC-27B	Mercedes-Benz IC108E	(Brazil) Tarso Marques **(R)**	2		14	25																			28th	4
1999	Penske PC-27B	Mercedes-Benz IC108E	(Brazil) Tarso Marques **(R)**	3					9	26		18														28th	4
1999	Lola B99/00	Mercedes-Benz IC108E	(Brazil) Tarso Marques **(R)**	3									24													28th	4
1999	Penske PC-27B	Mercedes-Benz IC108E	(United States) Alex Barron	3												18								24		27th	4
1999	Lola B99/00	Mercedes-Benz IC108E	(Uruguay) Gonzalo Rodríguez **(R)**	3													12				DNS^{†}					33rd	1
2000					MIA	LBH	RIO	MOT	NAZ	MIL	DET	POR	CLE	TOR	MCH	CHI	MOH	ROA	VAN	LAG	GAT	HOU	SRF	FON			
2000	Reynard 2Ki	Honda HR-0	(Brazil) Gil de Ferran	2	**6***	**7***	17	9	1	12	9	1	14	6	18	3	**2**	25	5	2	8	**3***	23	**3**		1st	168
2000	Reynard 2Ki	Honda HR-0	(Brazil) Hélio Castroneves	3	25	2	24	13	16	16	1	**7***	21	**16**	5*	21	1*	9	20	**1***	9	5	6	9		7th	129
2001					MTY	LBH	TEX	NAZ	MOT	MIL	DET	POR	CLE	TOR	MCH	CHI	MOH	ROA	VAN	LAU	ROC	HOU	LAG	SRF	FON		
2001	Reynard 01i	Honda HR-1	(Brazil) Gil de Ferran	1	2	3	C^{1}	23	13	7	6	13	4	**14***	24	3	**2**	5	2	**8**	1*	**1***	**3***	4	6	1st	199
2001	Reynard 01i	Honda HR-1	(Brazil) Hélio Castroneves	3	8	**1***	C^{1}	11	**2***	26	**1***	17	12	19	8	7*	1*	7*	18	12	4	5	6	20	22	4th	141

- ^{†} Gonzalo Rodríguez was killed during practice for the Laguna Seca race.
- ^{1} The Firestone Firehawk 600 was canceled after qualifying due to excessive g-forces on the drivers.

=== IndyCar Series results ===
(key)

Year	Chassis	Engine	Drivers	No.	1	2	3	4	5	6	7	8	9	10	11	12	13	14	15	16	17	18	19	Pos.	Pts.
2001					PHX	HMS	ATL	INDY	TXS	PPIR	RIR	KAN	NSH	KTY	GAT	CHI	TXS								
2001	Dallara IR-01	Oldsmobile Aurora V8	(Brazil) Gil de Ferran	66	24			2																28th	46
2001	Dallara IR-01	Oldsmobile Aurora V8	(Brazil) Hélio Castroneves	68	18			1*																24th	64
2002					HMS	PHX	FON	NAZ	INDY	TXS	PPIR	RIR	KAN	NSH	MCH	KTY	GAT	CHI	TXS						
2002	Dallara IR-02	Chevrolet Indy V8	(Brazil) Hélio Castroneves	3	3	**1**	5	5	1	4	2	17	3	9	6	5	2*	4	2*					2nd	511
2002	Dallara IR-02	Chevrolet Indy V8	(Brazil) Gil de Ferran	6	2	2	4	**3***	10	16	**1***	**2***	5	2	5	21	**1**	23						3rd	443
2002	Dallara IR-02	Chevrolet Indy V8	(Italy) Max Papis	6															21					43rd	16
2003					HMS	PHX	MOT	INDY	TXS	PPIR	RIR	KAN	NSH	MCH	GAT	KTY	NAZ	CHI	FON	TXS					
2003	Dallara IR-03; G-Force GF09	Toyota Indy V8	(Brazil) Hélio Castroneves	3	3	2	22	**2**	7	12	2	2	3	17	**1***	5	1*	20	**6**	13				3rd	484
2003	Dallara IR-03; G-Force GF09	Toyota Indy V8	(Brazil) Gil de Ferran	6	2*	14		1	8	3	3	3*	1	7	3	9	4	12	15	**1***				2nd	489
2003	Dallara IR-03; G-Force GF09	Toyota Indy V8	(United States) Alex Barron	6			17																	17th	216
2004					HMS	PHX	MOT	INDY	TXS	RIR	KAN	NSH	MIL	MCH	KTY	PPIR	NAZ	CHI	FON	TXS					
2004	Dallara IR-04	Toyota Indy V8	(Brazil) Hélio Castroneves	3	2*	6	3	9	12	**3**	7	3	12	10	12	6	**5***	**10**	**7***	**1***				4th	446
2004	Dallara IR-04	Toyota Indy V8	(United States) Sam Hornish Jr.	6	1	15	19	26	4	11	8	2	3	4	14	18	11	6	4	17				7th	387
2005					HMS	PHX	STP	MOT	INDY	TXS	RIR	KAN	NSH	MIL	MCH	KTY	PPIR	SNM	CHI	WGL	FON				
2005	Dallara IR-05	Toyota Indy V8	(Brazil) Hélio Castroneves	3	5	2	20	11	9	5	1*	8	5	16	21	5	**4**	21	2	**12**	9			6th	440
2005	Dallara IR-05	Toyota Indy V8	(United States) Sam Hornish Jr.	6	2	1	15	**7**	23*	2	**18**	12	2	**1***	5	7	2*	17	3	7	5			3rd	512
2006					HMS	STP	MOT	INDY	WGL	TXS	RIR	KAN	NSH	MIL	MCH	KTY	SNM	CHI							
2006	Dallara IR-05	Honda HI6R V8	(Brazil) Hélio Castroneves	3	2	1*	**1***	25	**7**	1	**10**	6	5	**14**	**1**	**3**	5	4						3rd	473
2006	Dallara IR-05	Honda HI6R V8	(United States) Sam Hornish Jr.	6	**3***	8	4	**1**	12	**4**	1*	1*	14	2	19	1	9	**3**						1st	475
2007					HMS	STP	MOT	KAN	INDY	MIL	TXS	IOW	RIR	WGL	NSH	MOH	MCH	KTY	SNM	DET	CHI				
2007	Dallara IR-05	Honda HI7R V8	(Brazil) Hélio Castroneves	3	9	**1***	**7**	3	**3**	**16***	16	8	11	**18**	6	**3***	17	9	2	**14**	4			6th	446
2007	Dallara IR-05	Honda HI7R V8	(United States) Sam Hornish Jr.	6	3	7	5	6	4	9	1*	14	15	2	4	14	9	18	5	12	3*			5th	465
2008					HMS	STP	MOT	LBH	KAN	INDY	MIL	TXS	IOW	RIR	WGL	NSH	MOH	EDM	KTY	SNM	DET	CHI	SRF^{1}		
2008	Dallara IR-05	Honda HI8R V8	(Brazil) Hélio Castroneves	3	4	2	**2**		4	4	5	2*	14*	2	16	**3**	**2**	2*	2	**1***	2	1*	7	2nd	629
2008	Dallara IR-05	Honda HI8R V8	(Australia) Ryan Briscoe	6	19	23	9		7	23	1	3	7	15	**12***	23	1*	**6**	7	2	9	**3**	1	5th	447
2009					STP	LBH	KAN	INDY	MIL	TXS	IOW	RIR	WGL	TOR	EDM	KTY	MOH	SNM	CHI	MOT	HMS				
2009	Dallara IR-05	Honda HI9R V8	(Brazil) Hélio Castroneves	3		7	2	**1**	11	1	**7**	17	4	18	2	4	12	18	20	10	5			4th	433
2009	Dallara IR-05	Honda HI9R V8	(Australia) Will Power	3	6																			19th	215
2009	Dallara IR-05	Honda HI9R V8	(Australia) Will Power	12		**2**		5						3	**1***	9		DNS						19th	215
2009	Dallara IR-05	Honda HI9R V8	(Australia) Ryan Briscoe	6	1	13	4	15	**2***	2*	2*	19	**2**	2	4	1	**2**	2	**1***	18	2*			3rd	604
2010					SAO	STP	ALA	LBH	KAN	INDY	TXS	IOW	WGL	TOR	EDM	MOH	SNM	CHI	KTY	MOT	HMS				
2010	Dallara IR-05	Honda HI10R V8	(Brazil) Hélio Castroneves	3	9	4	1	7	4	**9**	20	2	9	24	10	3	5	6	1	**1***	5			4th	531
2010	Dallara IR-05	Honda HI10R V8	(Australia) Ryan Briscoe	6	14	3	6	8	**6**	24	**1***	4	2	18	4	6	4	**11***	24	4	4			5th	482
2010	Dallara IR-05	Honda HI10R V8	(Australia) Will Power	12	1	**1***	**4**	**3**	12	8	14	**5**	**1***	1	**2***	**2**	**1***	16	8	3	25			2nd	597
2011					STP	ALA	LBH	SAO	INDY	TXS		MIL	IOW	TOR	EDM	MOH	NHM	SNM	BAL	MOT	KTY	LSV			
2011	Dallara IR-05	Honda HI11R V8	(Brazil) Hélio Castroneves	3	20	7	12	21	17	10	4	9	7	17	2	19	17	2	17	22	29	C^{2}		11th	312
2011	Dallara IR-05	Honda HI11R V8	(Australia) Ryan Briscoe	6	18	21	2*	3	27	6	3	11	6	7	10	16	8	3	14	20	8	C^{2}		6th	364
2011	Dallara IR-05	Honda HI11R V8	(Australia) Will Power	12	**2**	**1***	**10**	**1***	14	3	1*	4	21	**24***	1*	14	5	**1***	**1***	2	**19**	C^{2}		2nd	555
2012					STP	ALA	LBH	SAO	INDY	DET	TEX	MIL	IOW	TOR	EDM	MOH	SNM	BAL	FON						
2012	Dallara DW12	Chevrolet IndyCar V6t	(Australia) Ryan Briscoe	2	5	14	**7**	25	**5**	16	3	14	18	19	8	7	1	2	17					6th	370
2012	Dallara DW12	Chevrolet IndyCar V6t	(Brazil) Hélio Castroneves	3	1	**3**	13	4	10	17	7	6	6*	6	1	16	6	10	5					4th	431
2012	Dallara DW12	Chevrolet IndyCar V6t	(Australia) Will Power	12	**7**	1	1	**1***	28	4	8	12	23	15	3	**2***	**2***	**6***	24					2nd	465
2013					STP	ALA	LBH	SAO	INDY	DET		TXS	MIL	IOW	POC	TOR		MOH	SNM	BAL	HOU		FON		
2013	Dallara DW12	Chevrolet IndyCar V6t	(United States) A. J. Allmendinger	2		19	23		7	25	25												16	27th	79
2013	Dallara DW12	Chevrolet IndyCar V6t	(Brazil) Hélio Castroneves	3	2	3	10	13	6	5	8	1*	2	**8**	8	6	2	6	7	9	18	**23**	6	2nd	550
2013	Dallara DW12	Chevrolet IndyCar V6t	(Australia) Will Power	12	**16**	5	16	24	19	8	20	**7**	3	17	4	15*	18	4	1	18*	12	1*	**1***	4th	498
2014					STP	LBH	ALA	IMS	INDY	DET		TXS	HOU		POC	IOW	TOR		MOH	MIL	SNM	FON			
2014	Dallara DW12	Chevrolet IndyCar V6t	(Colombia) Juan Pablo Montoya	2	15	4	21	16	5	12	13	3	2	7	**1**	16	18	19	11	2	5	4*		4th	586
2014	Dallara DW12	Chevrolet IndyCar V6t	(Brazil) Hélio Castroneves	3	3	11	19	3	2	**5***	1*	8	9	**21***	2	8	2	**12***	19	11	18	**14**		2nd	609
2014	Dallara DW12	Chevrolet IndyCar V6t	(Australia) Will Power	12	1*	2	**5**	8	8	1	2	**2***	14	11	10	14	10	3	6	**1***	**10***	9		1st	671
2015					STP	NOL	LBH	ALA	IMS	INDY	DET		TXS	TOR	FON	MIL	IOW	MOH	POC	SNM					
2015	Dallara DW12	Chevrolet IndyCar V6t	(Australia) Will Power	1	**2***	7	20	4	**1***	2	**4**	18	**13**	**4***	19*	22	10	14	4	**7**				3rd	493
2015	Dallara DW12	Chevrolet IndyCar V6t	(Colombia) Juan Pablo Montoya	2	1	**5***	3	14	3	1	10	**10***	4	7	4	4	24	11	3	6				2nd	556
2015	Dallara DW12	Chevrolet IndyCar V6t	(Brazil) Hélio Castroneves	3	4	2	**2**	**15**	6	7	6	19	3	3	23	2	**11**	15	**16**	15				5th	453
2015	Dallara DW12	Chevrolet IndyCar V6t	(France) Simon Pagenaud	22	5	20	4	9	25	10	3	14	11	11	**9**	9	14	3	7	16				11th	384
2016					STP	PHX	LBH	ALA	IMS	INDY	DET		ROA	IOW	TOR	MOH	POC	TXS	WGL	SNM					
2016	Dallara DW12	Chevrolet IndyCar V6t	(Colombia) Juan Pablo Montoya	2	1	9	4	5	8	33	3	20	7	20	20	11	8	9	13	3				8th	433
2016	Dallara DW12	Chevrolet IndyCar V6t	(Brazil) Hélio Castroneves	3	4	**11**	**3***	7	2	11	5	14	5	13	2	15	19	5	3	7				3rd	504
2016	Dallara DW12	Chevrolet IndyCar V6t	(Australia) Will Power	12	**DNS**	3	7	4	19	10	20	1	**1***	2	1	2	1	8	20	20				2nd	532
2016	Dallara DW12	Chevrolet IndyCar V6t	(Spain) Oriol Servià	12	18																			24th	72
2016	Dallara DW12	Chevrolet IndyCar V6t	(France) Simon Pagenaud	22	2*	2	1	**1***	**1***	19	**13***	**2***	13	**4**	9	**1**	18	4	7	**1***				1st	659
2017					STP	LBH	ALA	PHX	IMS	INDY	DET		TEX	ROA	IOW	TOR	MOH	POC	GAT	WGL	SNM				
2017	Dallara DW12	Chevrolet IndyCar V6t	(France) Simon Pagenaud	1	2	5	3	1*	4	14	16	5	3	4	7	**5**	4	4	3	9	1*			2nd	629
2017	Dallara DW12	Chevrolet IndyCar V6t	(United States) Josef Newgarden	2	8	3	1	9	11	19	4	2	13	2	6	1*	1*	2	1*	18	2			1st	642
2017	Dallara DW12	Chevrolet IndyCar V6t	(Brazil) Hélio Castroneves	3	6	**9**	4	**4**	5	2	7	9	20	**3**	1*	8	7	7	4	4	5			4th	598
2017	Dallara DW12	Chevrolet IndyCar V6t	(Australia) Will Power	12	**19**	13	**14***	2	**1***	23	18	3	1*	5	**4**	21	**2**	1	**20**	6	3			5th	562
2017	Dallara DW12	Chevrolet IndyCar V6t	(Colombia) Juan Pablo Montoya	22					10	6														24th	93
2018					STP	PHX	LBH	ALA	IMS	INDY	DET		TXS	ROA	IOW	TOR	MOH	POC	GAT	POR	SNM				
2018	Dallara DW12	Chevrolet IndyCar V6t	(United States) Josef Newgarden	1	7	1	7	**1***	11	8	9	15	**13**	**1***	4*	**9**	4	5	7	10	8			5th	560
2018	Dallara DW12	Chevrolet IndyCar V6t	(Brazil) Hélio Castroneves	3					6	27														32nd	40
2018	Dallara DW12	Chevrolet IndyCar V6t	(Australia) Will Power	12	10	22*	2	21	**1***	1	7	2	18	23	**6**	18	3	**2**	1	**21**	3			3rd	582
2018	Dallara DW12	Chevrolet IndyCar V6t	(France) Simon Pagenaud	22	13	10	24	9	8	6	17	10	2	7	8	2	8	8	4	6	4			6th	492
2019					STP	COA	ALA	LBH	IMS	INDY	DET		TXS	ROA	TOR	IOW	MOH	POC	GAT	POR	LAG				
2019	Dallara DW12	Chevrolet IndyCar V6t	(United States) Josef Newgarden	2	1*	2	4	2	15	4	1*	**19**	1	3	4	1*	14	**5**	**7**	5	8			1st	641
2019	Dallara DW12	Chevrolet IndyCar V6t	(Brazil) Hélio Castroneves	3					21	18														29th	33
2019	Dallara DW12	Chevrolet IndyCar V6t	(Australia) Will Power	12	**3**	**24***	11	7	7	5	18	3	9	2	18	15	**4**	1	22	1*	2			5th	550
2019	Dallara DW12	Chevrolet IndyCar V6t	(France) Simon Pagenaud	22	7	19	9	6	1	**1***	6	17	6	9	**1***	**4**	6	3*	5	7	4			2nd	616
2020					TXS	IMS	ROA		IOW		INDY	GAT		MOH		IMS		STP							
2020	Dallara DW12	Chevrolet IndyCar V6t	(United States) Josef Newgarden	1	**3**	7	**14***	9	5	**1***	5	12	1	2	8	1*	4	1						2nd	521
2020	Dallara DW12	Chevrolet IndyCar V6t	(Brazil) Hélio Castroneves	3							11													27th	57
2020	Dallara DW12	Chevrolet IndyCar V6t	(New Zealand) Scott McLaughlin	3														22						35th	8
2020	Dallara DW12	Chevrolet IndyCar V6t	(Australia) Will Power	12	13	**20***	2	11	21	2	14	**17**	3	**1***	6	7	**1***	**24**						5th	396
2020	Dallara DW12	Chevrolet IndyCar V6t	(France) Simon Pagenaud	22	2	3	12	13	1*	4	22	19	16	18	6	16	10	6						8th	339
2021					ALA	STP	TXS		IMS	INDY	DET		ROA	MOH	NSH	IMS	GAT	POR	LAG	LBH					
2021	Dallara DW12	Chevrolet IndyCar V6t	(United States) Josef Newgarden	2	23	2	6	2	4	12	10	**2***	**21***	**1***	10	8	1*	5	7	**2**				2nd	511
2021	Dallara DW12	Chevrolet IndyCar V6t	(New Zealand) Scott McLaughlin	3	14	11	2	8	8	20	19	20	14	12	22	23	4	9	12	11				14th	305
2021	Dallara DW12	Chevrolet IndyCar V6t	(Australia) Will Power	12	2	8	14	13	11	30	20*	6	3	25	14	1*	**3**	13	26	10				9th	357
2021	Dallara DW12	Chevrolet IndyCar V6t	(France) Simon Pagenaud	22	12	3	10	6	6	3	12	8	18	14	21	16	8	21	8	5				8th	383
2022					STP	TXS	LBH	ALA	IMS	INDY	DET	ROA	MOH	TOR	IOW		IMS	NSH	GAT	POR	LAG				
2022	Dallara DW12	Chevrolet IndyCar V6t	(United States) Josef Newgarden	2	16	1	1*	14	25	13	**4**	1*	7	10	1*	24*	5	6	1	8	2			2nd	544
2022	Dallara DW12	Chevrolet IndyCar V6t	(New Zealand) Scott McLaughlin	3	**1***	2*	14	6	20	29	19	7	1*	9	22	3	4	**2**	3	**1***	6			4th	510
2022	Dallara DW12	Chevrolet IndyCar V6t	(Australia) Will Power	12	3	4	4	4	**3**	15	1*	19	3	15	**3**	**2**	3	11	**6***	2	**3**			1st	560
2023					STP	TXS	LBH	ALA	IMS	INDY	DET	ROA	MOH	TOR	IOW		NSH	IMS	GAT	POR	LAG				
2023	Dallara DW12	Chevrolet IndyCar V6t	(United States) Josef Newgarden	2	17	1*	9	15	7	1	10	2	12	5	1*	1*	4	25	25	5	21			5th	479
2023	Dallara DW12	Chevrolet IndyCar V6t	(New Zealand) Scott McLaughlin	3	13*	6	10	1	16	14	7	8	5	6	2	5	**2**	8	**5**	9	2			3rd	488
2023	Dallara DW12	Chevrolet IndyCar V6t	(Australia) Will Power	12	7	16	6	3	12	23	2	13	3	14	**5**	**2**	10	6	9	25	4			7th	425
2024					STP	THE^{1}	LBH	ALA	IMS	INDY	DET	ROA	LAG	MOH	IOW		TOR	GAT	POR	MIL		NSH			
2024	Dallara DW12	Chevrolet IndyCar V6t	(United States) Josef Newgarden	2	**26**	8	4	16	17	1	26	2	19	25	3	7	11	1	3	26	**27**	3		8th	401
2024	Dallara DW12	Chevrolet IndyCar V6t	(New Zealand) Scott McLaughlin	3	27	2	26	**1***	6	**6***	20	3*	21	3	1*	**3**	16	**2**	7	**8**	1*	5		3rd	505
2024	Dallara DW12	Chevrolet IndyCar V6t	(Australia) Will Power	12	2	DNQ	6	2	2	24	6	1	7	11	18	1	12	18*	1*	2	10	24		4th	498
2025					STP	THE	LBH	ALA	IGP	INDY	DET	GAT	ROA	MOH	IOW		TOR	LAG	POR	MIL	NSH				
2025	Dallara DW12	Chevrolet IndyCar V6t	(United States) Josef Newgarden	2	3	13	27	10	12	22	9	25	25	27	**2***	10	24	11	24	7	1			12th	316
2025	Dallara DW12	Chevrolet IndyCar V6t	(New Zealand) Scott McLaughlin	3	**4***	27	6	3	4	30	12	24	12	23	4	26	26	10	7	3	3			10th	356
2025	Dallara DW12	Chevrolet IndyCar V6t	(Australia) Will Power	12	26	6	5	5	3	16	4	**27**	14	26	3	24	11	7	1*	26	21			9th	357
2026					STP	PHX	ARL	ALA	LBH	IMS	INDY	DET	GAT	ROA	MOH	NSH	POR	MAR	D.C.	MIL		LAG			
2026	Dallara DW12	Chevrolet IndyCar V6t	(United States) Josef Newgarden	2	7	1	15	10	14	4	28	10	1	22	9	2	8	13	8	7	25	15		8th	423
2026	Dallara DW12	Chevrolet IndyCar V6t	(New Zealand) Scott McLaughlin	3	**2**	8	11	16	6	16	3	19	5	7	16	4	7	8	22	**4**	2	**1***		6th	483
2026	Dallara DW12	Chevrolet IndyCar V6t	(United States) David Malukas	12	13	**3***	6	4	7	2	2	18	7	2	8	3	12	17	24	2	4	5		5th	514

* Season still in progress

1. Non-points-paying, exhibition race.
2. The final race at Las Vegas was abandoned after 12 laps due to Dan Wheldon's death.

=== Complete Formula One World Championship results ===
(italics indicates non-works entries; bold indicates championships won)

Formula One results
Year	Entrant	Car	Engine	Tyres	No.	Drivers	Points	WCC
1974	Penske Cars	Penske PC1	Ford Cosworth DFV 3.0 V8	G	66	(United States) Mark Donohue	0	-
1975	Penske Cars; Penske Cars	Penske PC1; March 751	Ford Cosworth DFV 3.0 V8	G	28	(United States) Mark Donohue (United Kingdom) John Watson	2	12th
1976	Citibank Team Penske	Penske PC3; Penske PC4	Ford Cosworth DFV 3.0 V8	G	28	(United Kingdom) John Watson	20	5th
1976	F&S Properties	Penske PC3	Ford Cosworth DFV 3.0 V8	G	39	(Netherlands) Boy Hayje	20	5th
1977	ATS Racing Team	Penske PC4	Ford Cosworth DFV 3.0 V8	G	33 / 35; 34; 35	(Austria) Hans Binder (France) Jean-Pierre Jarier (West Germany) Hans Heyer	1	12th
1977	Interscope Racing	Penske PC4	Ford Cosworth DFV 3.0 V8	G	14	(United States) Danny Ongais	1	12th

=== American Le Mans Series results ===
Year	Entrant	Chassis	Engine	Class	No	Drivers	Rds	1	2	3	4	5	6	7	8	9	10	11	12	Pos.	Pts.
2005								SEB	ATL	MOH	LIM	SON	POR	ROA	MOS	ATL	LGA				
2005	(United States) DHL Porsche Penske Racing	Porsche RS Spyder	Porche MR6 3.4L V8	LMP2	6	(Germany) Lucas Luhr (Germany) Sascha Maassen	1										1			5th	23
2006								SEB	HOU	MOH	LIM	UTH	POR	ROA	MOS	ATL	LGA				
2006	(United States) DHL Porsche Penske Racing	Porsche RS Spyder	Porsche MR6 3.4L V8	LMP2	6	(Germany) Sascha Maassen	All	2	3	2	2	1	2	1	2	1	2			1st	184
2006	(United States) DHL Porsche Penske Racing	Porsche RS Spyder	Porsche MR6 3.4L V8	LMP2	6	(Germany) Lucas Luhr	6	2	3	2	2	1	2	1	2	1	2			1st	184
2006	(United States) DHL Porsche Penske Racing	Porsche RS Spyder	Porsche MR6 3.4L V8	LMP2	6	(France) Emmanuel Collard	3	2	3	2	2	1	2	1	2	1	2			1st	184
2006	(United States) DHL Porsche Penske Racing	Porsche RS Spyder	Porsche MR6 3.4L V8	LMP2	6	(Germany) Timo Bernhard	3	2	3	2	2	1	2	1	2	1	2			1st	184
2006	(United States) DHL Porsche Penske Racing	Porsche RS Spyder	Porsche MR6 3.4L V8	LMP2	7	(France) Romain Dumas	All	6	5	1	1	1	3	2	1	2	1			3rd	155
2006	(United States) DHL Porsche Penske Racing	Porsche RS Spyder	Porsche MR6 3.4L V8	LMP2	7	(Germany) Timo Bernhard	6	6	5	1	1	1	3	2	1	2	1			3rd	155
2006	(United States) DHL Porsche Penske Racing	Porsche RS Spyder	Porsche MR6 3.4L V8	LMP2	7	(Germany) Lucas Luhr	4	6	5	1	1	1	3	2	1	2	1			3rd	155
2006	(United States) DHL Porsche Penske Racing	Porsche RS Spyder	Porsche MR6 3.4L V8	LMP2	7	(United States) Patrick Long	1	6	5	1	1	1	3	2	1	2	1			3rd	155
2006	(United States) DHL Porsche Penske Racing	Porsche RS Spyder	Porsche MR6 3.4L V8	LMP2	7	(Germany) Mike Rockenfeller	1	6	5	1	1	1	3	2	1	2	1			3rd	155
2007								SEB	STP	LGB	HOU	UTH	LIM	MOH	ROA	MOS	DET	ATL	LGA		
2007	(United States) DHL Porsche Penske Racing	Porsche RS Spyder Evo	Porsche MR6 3.4 L V8	LMP2	6	(Germany) Sascha Maassen (Australia) Ryan Briscoe	All	3	1	2	3	1	1	2	2	2	7	5	2	2nd	186
2007	(United States) DHL Porsche Penske Racing	Porsche RS Spyder Evo	Porsche MR6 3.4 L V8	LMP2	6	(France) Emmanuel Collard	2	3	1	2	3	1	1	2	2	2	7	5	2	2nd	186
2007	(United States) DHL Porsche Penske Racing	Porsche RS Spyder Evo	Porsche MR6 3.4 L V8	LMP2	7	(Germany) Timo Bernhard (France) Romain Dumas	All	3	2	1	1	2	2	1	1	1	1	1	1	1st	239
2007	(United States) DHL Porsche Penske Racing	Porsche RS Spyder Evo	Porsche MR6 3.4 L V8	LMP2	7	(United States) Patrick Long	2	3	2	1	1	2	2	1	1	1	1	1	1	1st	239
2007	(United States) DHL Porsche Penske Racing	Porsche RS Spyder Evo	Porsche MR6 3.4 L V8	LMP2	7	(Brazil) Hélio Castroneves	1	3	2	1	1	2	2	1	1	1	1	1	1	1st	239
2008								SEB	STP	LGB	UTH	LIM	MOH	ROA	MOS	DET	ATL	LGA			
2008	(United States) DHL Porsche Penske Racing	Porsche RS Spyder Evo	Porsche MR6 3.4 L V8	LMP2	5	(Australia) Ryan Briscoe (Brazil) Hélio Castroneves	2										1	4		12th	45
2008	(United States) DHL Porsche Penske Racing	Porsche RS Spyder Evo	Porsche MR6 3.4 L V8	LMP2	6	(United States) Patrick Long	All	8	3	3	2	3	4	4	3	5	3	8		3rd	129
2008	(United States) DHL Porsche Penske Racing	Porsche RS Spyder Evo	Porsche MR6 3.4 L V8	LMP2	6	(Germany) Sascha Maassen	10	8	3	3	2	3	4	4	3	5	3	8		3rd	129
2008	(United States) DHL Porsche Penske Racing	Porsche RS Spyder Evo	Porsche MR6 3.4 L V8	LMP2	6	(Australia) Ryan Briscoe	2	8	3	3	2	3	4	4	3	5	3	8		3rd	129
2008	(United States) DHL Porsche Penske Racing	Porsche RS Spyder Evo	Porsche MR6 3.4 L V8	LMP2	7	(Germany) Timo Bernhard (France) Emmanuel Collard	All	1	1	2	1	2	1	2	6	4	2	3		1st	203
2008	(United States) DHL Porsche Penske Racing	Porsche RS Spyder Evo	Porsche MR6 3.4 L V8	LMP2	7	(France) Emmanuel Collard	1	1	1	2	1	2	1	2	6	4	2	3		1st	203

=== Rolex Sports Car Series ===
Year	Chassis	Engine	Drivers	No.	Class	1	2	3	4	5	6	7	8	9	10	11	12	Pos.	Pts.
2009						DAY	VIR	NJ	LGA	WGI	MOH	DAY	BAR	WGI	MON	MIL	HOM		
2009	Dallara Corvette DP	Chevrolet 5.5 L V8	(Germany) Timo Bernhard (France) Romain Dumas	12; 16	DP	6	7	3	6	3	4	11	15	13	2	4	11	4th	296

=== IMSA SportsCar Championship results ===
Year	Car	1	2	3	4	5	6	7	8	9	10	Position	Points
2018		DAY	SEB	LBH	MOH	BEL	WGL	MOS	ELK	LGA	ATL		
2018	#6 Acura ARX-05	10	14	**5**	2	3	3	10	5	3	13	5th	251
2018	#7 Acura ARX-05	9	15	6	**1**	2	12	5	9	10	5	7th	244
2019		DAY	SEB	LBH	MOH	BEL	WGL	MOS	ELK	LGA	ATL		
2019	#6 Acura ARX-05	6	**9**	3	1	**1**	3	3	**2**	1	4	1st	302
2019	#7 Acura ARX-05	3	4	**2**	5	3	5	5	7	**2**	3	3rd	284
2020		DAY1	DAY2	SEB1	ELK	ATL1	MOH	ATL2	LGA	SEB2			
2020	#6 Acura ARX-05	4	4	6	8	6	**7**	**3**	**2**	2		7th	247
2020	#7 Acura ARX-05	8	**8**	7	**1**	**1**	1	2	1	**8**		1st	265
2023		DAY	SEB	LBH	LAG	WGL	MOS	ELK	IMS	PET			
2023	#6 Porsche 963	8	3	1	2	**9**	5	7	1	10		4th	2691
2023	#7 Porsche 963	7	5	3	**9**	7	6	1	**2**	4		5th	2691
2024		DAY	SEB	LBH	LGA	DET	WGL	ELK	IMS	ATL			
2024	#6 Porsche 963	4	9	4	1	**2**	3	1	53	2		2nd	2869
2024	#7 Porsche 963	1	3	3	3	4	1	2	15	3		1st	2982
2025		DAY	SEB	LBH	LGA	DET	WGL	ELK	IMS	ATL			
2025	#6 Porsche 963	3	2	2	1	3	2	5	7	3		1st	2907
2025	#7 Porsche 963	1	1	1	2	4	11	11	12	10		2nd	2689
2026		DAY	SEB	LBH	LGA	DET	WGL	ELK	IMS	ATL			
2026	#6 Porsche 963	4	2	3	6	8	6	10				7th	2010*
2026	#7 Porsche 963	1	1	4	7	5	5	6				4th	2159*

* Season still in progress

=== 24 Hours of Le Mans results ===
Year	Entrant	No.	Car	Drivers	Class	Laps	Pos.	Class Pos.
1971	(United States) North American Racing Team (United States) Penske Racing	11	Ferrari 512M	(United States) Mark Donohue (United Kingdom) David Hobbs	S 5.0	58	DNF	DNF
2022	(United States) Team Penske	5	Oreca 07-Gibson	(United States) Dane Cameron (France) Emmanuel Collard (Brazil) Felipe Nasr	LMP2	368	9th	5th
2023	(Germany) Porsche Penske Motorsport	5	Porsche 963	(United States) Dane Cameron (Denmark) Michael Christensen (France) Frédéric Makowiecki	Hypercar	325	16th	9th
2023	(Germany) Porsche Penske Motorsport	6	Porsche 963	(France) Kévin Estre (Germany) André Lotterer (Belgium) Laurens Vanthoor	Hypercar	320	22nd	11th
2023	(Germany) Porsche Penske Motorsport	75	Porsche 963	(France) Mathieu Jaminet (Brazil) Felipe Nasr (United Kingdom) Nick Tandy	Hypercar	84	DNF	DNF
2024	(Germany) Porsche Penske Motorsport	4	Porsche 963	(France) Mathieu Jaminet (Brazil) Felipe Nasr (United Kingdom) Nick Tandy	Hypercar	211	DNF	DNF
2024	(Germany) Porsche Penske Motorsport	5	Porsche 963	(Australia) Matt Campbell (Denmark) Michael Christensen (France) Frédéric Makowiecki	Hypercar	311	6th	6th
2024	(Germany) Porsche Penske Motorsport	6	Porsche 963	(France) Kévin Estre (Germany) André Lotterer (Belgium) Laurens Vanthoor	Hypercar	311	4th	4th
2025	(Germany) Porsche Penske Motorsport	4	Porsche 963	(Brazil) Felipe Nasr (United Kingdom) Nick Tandy (Germany) Pascal Wehrlein	Hypercar	386	8th	8th
2025	(Germany) Porsche Penske Motorsport	5	Porsche 963	(France) Julien Andlauer (Denmark) Michael Christensen (France) Mathieu Jaminet	Hypercar	386	6th	6th
2025	(Germany) Porsche Penske Motorsport	6	Porsche 963	(Australia) Matt Campbell (France) Kévin Estre (Belgium) Laurens Vanthoor	Hypercar	387	**2nd**	**2nd**

=== FIA World Endurance Championship Results ===
Year	Car	Class	1	2	3	4	5	6	7	8	Pos.	Pts.
2022			SEB	SPA	LMS	MNZ	FUJ	BHR				
2022	#5 Oreca 07	LMP2	8	4	4						8th	42
2023			SEB	POR	SPA	LMN	MON	FUJ	BHR			
2023	#5 Porsche 963	Hypercar	5	10	4	9	4	12	7		3rd	99
2023	#6 Porsche 963	Hypercar	6	3	Ret	11	7	3	5		3rd	99
2024			QAT	IMO	SPA	LMN	SAP	COA	FUJ	BHR		
2024	#5 Porsche 963	Hypercar	**3**	3	**Ret**	6	3	7	Ret	2	2nd	188
2024	#6 Porsche 963	Hypercar	1	2	2	**4**	2	6	1	10	2nd	188
2025			QAT	IMO	SPA	LMN	SAO	COA	FUJ	BHR		
2025	#5 Porsche 963	Hypercar	10	11	12	6	3	10	4	14	3rd	165
2025	#6 Porsche 963	Hypercar	11	8	9	2	4	1	3	13	3rd	165

* Season still in progress

== Championships and major wins ==
=== IndyCar champions ===
Year	Driver	Wins	Chassis	Engine	Tires
1977	(United States) Tom Sneva	2	McLaren M24; Penske PC-5	Cosworth	Goodyear
1978	(United States) Tom Sneva (2)	0	Penske PC-6	Cosworth	Goodyear
1979	(United States) Rick Mears	3	Penske PC-7; Penske PC-6	Cosworth	Goodyear
1981	(United States) Rick Mears (2)	6	Penske PC-9B	Cosworth	Goodyear
1982	(United States) Rick Mears (3)	4	Penske PC-10	Cosworth	Goodyear
1983	(United States) Al Unser	1	Penske PC-11	Cosworth	Goodyear
1985	(United States) Al Unser (2)	1	March 85C	Cosworth	Goodyear
1988	(United States) Danny Sullivan	4	Penske PC-17	Chevrolet A	Goodyear
1994	(United States) Al Unser Jr.	8	Penske PC-23	Ilmor, Mercedes-Benz	Goodyear
2000	(Brazil) Gil de Ferran	2	Reynard 2KI	Honda HR-0	Firestone
2001	(Brazil) Gil de Ferran (2)	2	Reynard 01i	Honda HR-1	Firestone
2006	(United States) Sam Hornish Jr.	4	Dallara IR-05	Honda HI6R	Firestone
2014	(Australia) Will Power	3	Dallara DW12	Chevrolet IndyCar V6t	Firestone
2016	(France) Simon Pagenaud	5	Dallara DW12	Chevrolet IndyCar V6t	Firestone
2017	(United States) Josef Newgarden	4	Dallara DW12	Chevrolet IndyCar V6t	Firestone
2019	(United States) Josef Newgarden (2)	4	Dallara DW12	Chevrolet IndyCar V6t	Firestone
2022	(Australia) Will Power (2)	1	Dallara DW12	Chevrolet IndyCar V6t	Firestone

=== Indianapolis 500 victories ===
Year	Driver	Chassis	Engine	Tires
1972	(United States) Mark Donohue	McLaren M16B	Offenhauser	Goodyear
1979	(United States) Rick Mears	Penske PC-6	Cosworth	Goodyear
1981	(United States) Bobby Unser	Penske PC-9B	Cosworth	Goodyear
1984	(United States) Rick Mears (2)	March 84C	Cosworth	Goodyear
1985	(United States) Danny Sullivan	March 85C	Cosworth	Goodyear
1987	(United States) Al Unser	March 86C	Cosworth	Goodyear
1988	(United States) Rick Mears (3)	Penske PC-17	Chevrolet A	Goodyear
1991	(United States) Rick Mears (4)	Penske PC-20	Chevrolet A	Goodyear
1993	(Brazil) Emerson Fittipaldi	Penske PC-22	Chevrolet C	Goodyear
1994	(United States) Al Unser Jr.	Penske PC-23	Mercedes-Benz 500I	Goodyear
2001	(Brazil) Hélio Castroneves (R)	Dallara IR-01	Oldsmobile Aurora V8	Firestone
2002	(Brazil) Hélio Castroneves (2)	Dallara IR-02	Chevrolet Indy V8	Firestone
2003	(Brazil) Gil de Ferran	G-Force GF09	Toyota Indy V8	Firestone
2006	(United States) Sam Hornish Jr.	Dallara IR-05	Honda HI6R	Firestone
2009	(Brazil) Hélio Castroneves (3)	Dallara IR-05	Honda HI9R	Firestone
2015	(Colombia) Juan Pablo Montoya	Dallara DW12	Chevrolet IndyCar V6t	Firestone
2018	(Australia) Will Power	Dallara DW12	Chevrolet IndyCar V6t	Firestone
2019	(France) Simon Pagenaud	Dallara DW12	Chevrolet IndyCar V6t	Firestone
2023	(United States) Josef Newgarden	Dallara DW12	Chevrolet IndyCar V6t	Firestone
2024	(United States) Josef Newgarden (2)	Dallara DW12	Chevrolet IndyCar V6t	Firestone

=== IndyCar wins ===
IndyCar wins
#	Season	Date	Sanction	Track	No.	Winning driver	Chassis	Engine	Tires	Start	Laps Led
1	1971	July 3	USAC	Pocono 500 (O)	66	(United States) Mark Donohue	McLaren M16A	Offenhauser L4t 159 ci	Goodyear	Pole	126
2	1971	July 18	USAC	Michigan (O)	66	(United States) Mark Donohue (2)	McLaren M16A	Offenhauser L4t 159 ci	Goodyear	2	75
3	1972	April 23	USAC	Trenton Speedway (O)	7	(United States) Gary Bettenhausen	McLaren M16A	Offenhauser L4t 159 ci	Goodyear	5	85
4	1972	May 27	USAC	Indianapolis 500 (O)	66	(United States) Mark Donohue (3)	McLaren M16B	Offenhauser L4t 159 ci	Goodyear	3	13
5	1973	October 6	USAC	Texas World Speedway (O)	5	(United States) Gary Bettenhausen (2)	McLaren M16C	Offenhauser L4t 159 ci	Goodyear	14	14
6	1975	September 13	USAC	Michigan (O)	68	(United States) Tom Sneva	McLaren M16C	Offenhauser L4t 159 ci	Goodyear	7	7
7	1977	April 2	USAC	Texas World Speedway (O)	8	(United States) Tom Sneva (2)	McLaren M24	Cosworth DFX V8t	Goodyear	8	7
8	1977	June 26	USAC	Pocono 500 (O)	8	(United States) Tom Sneva (3)	McLaren M24	Cosworth DFX V8t	Goodyear	4	45
9	1978	June 18	USAC	Milwaukee Mile (O)	7	(United States) Rick Mears	Penske PC-6	Cosworth DFX V8t	Goodyear	3	23
10	1978	July 23	USAC	Atlanta Motor Speedway (O)	7	(United States) Rick Mears (2)	Penske PC-6	Cosworth DFX V8t	Goodyear	3	68
11	1978	September 23	USAC	Trenton Speedway (O)	7	(United States) Mario Andretti	Penske PC-6	Cosworth DFX V8t	Goodyear	3	33
12	1978	October 7	USAC	Brands Hatch (R)	7	(United States) Rick Mears (3)	Penske PC-6	Cosworth DFX V8t	Goodyear	2	17
13	1979	May 27	USAC	Indianapolis 500 (O)	9	(United States) Rick Mears (4)	Penske PC-6	Cosworth DFX V8t	Goodyear	Pole	25
14	1979	June 10	CART	Trenton Speedway Race 1 (O)	12	(United States) Bobby Unser	Penske PC-7	Cosworth DFX V8t	Goodyear	2	23
15	1979	June 10	CART	Trenton Speedway Race 2 (O)	12	(United States) Bobby Unser (2)	Penske PC-7	Cosworth DFX V8t	Goodyear	Pole	62
16	1979	July 15	CART	Michigan Twin 125 #2 (O)	12	(United States) Bobby Unser (3)	Penske PC-7	Cosworth DFX V8t	Goodyear	18	36
17	1979	August 5	CART	Watkins Glen (R)	12	(United States) Bobby Unser (4)	Penske PC-7	Cosworth DFX V8t	Goodyear	2	36
18	1979	August 19	CART	Trenton Speedway (O)	9	(United States) Rick Mears (5)	Penske PC-7	Cosworth DFX V8t	Goodyear	5	38
19	1979	September 2	CART	Ontario 500 (O)	12	(United States) Bobby Unser (5)	Penske PC-7	Cosworth DFX V8t	Goodyear	3	97
20	1979	September 15	CART	Michigan (O)	12	(United States) Bobby Unser (6)	Penske PC-7	Cosworth DFX V8t	Goodyear	Pole	49
21	1979	September 30	CART	Atlanta Motor Speedway (O)	9	(United States) Rick Mears (6)	Penske PC-7	Cosworth DFX V8t	Goodyear	2	30
22	1980	June 8	CART	Milwaukee Mile (O)	11	(United States) Bobby Unser (7)	Penske PC-9	Cosworth DFX V8t	Goodyear	5	29
23	1980	June 22	CART	Pocono 500 (O)	11	(United States) Bobby Unser (8)	Penske PC-9	Cosworth DFX V8t	Goodyear	Pole	116
24	1980	August 3	CART	Watkins Glen (R)	11	(United States) Bobby Unser (9)	Penske PC-9	Cosworth DFX V8t	Goodyear	3	18
25	1980	August 31	CART	Ontario 500 (O)	11	(United States) Bobby Unser (10)	Penske PC-9	Cosworth DFX V8t	Goodyear	Pole	182
26	1980	September 20	CART	Michigan (O)	12	(United States) Mario Andretti (2)	Penske PC-9	Cosworth DFX V8t	Goodyear	Pole	53
27	1980	October 26	CART	Autódromo Hermanos Rodríguez (R)	1	(United States) Rick Mears (7)	Penske PC-9	Cosworth DFX V8t	Goodyear	2	28
28	1981	May 24	USAC	Indianapolis 500 (O)	3	(United States) Bobby Unser (11)	Penske PC-9B	Cosworth DFX V8t	Goodyear	Pole	89
29	1981	June 21	CART	Atlanta Twin 125 #1 (O)	6	(United States) Rick Mears (8)	Penske PC-9B	Cosworth DFX V8t	Goodyear	7	5
30	1981	June 21	CART	Atlanta Twin 125 #2 (O)	6	(United States) Rick Mears (9)	Penske PC-9B	Cosworth DFX V8t	Goodyear	Pole	62
31	1981	August 30	CART	Riverside International Raceway (R)	6	(United States) Rick Mears (10)	Penske PC-9B	Cosworth DFX V8t	Goodyear	3	51
32	1981	September 20	CART	Michigan (O)	6	(United States) Rick Mears (11)	Penske PC-9B	Cosworth DFX V8t	Goodyear	Pole	22
33	1981	October 4	CART	Watkins Glen (R)	6	(United States) Rick Mears (12)	Penske PC-9B	Cosworth DFX V8t	Goodyear	3	15
34	1981	October 18	CART	Autódromo Hermanos Rodríguez (R)	6	(United States) Rick Mears (13)	Penske PC-9B	Cosworth DFX V8t	Goodyear	6	23
35	1982	March 28	CART	Phoenix International Raceway (O)	1	(United States) Rick Mears (14)	Penske PC-10	Cosworth DFX V8t	Goodyear	Pole	139
36	1982	May 1	CART	Atlanta Motor Speedway (O)	1	(United States) Rick Mears (15)	Penske PC-10	Cosworth DFX V8t	Goodyear	Pole	123
37	1982	August 15	CART	Pocono 500 (O)	1	(United States) Rick Mears (16)	Penske PC-10	Cosworth DFX V8t	Goodyear	Pole	142
38	1982	August 29	CART	Riverside International Raceway (R)	1	(United States) Rick Mears (17)	Penske PC-10	Cosworth DFX V8t	Goodyear	4	45
39	1983	July 3	CART	Grand Prix of Cleveland (A)	7	(United States) Al Unser	Penske PC-11	Cosworth DFX V8t	Goodyear	7	55
40	1983	September 18	CART	Michigan (O)	1	(United States) Rick Mears (18)	Penske PC-10B	Cosworth DFX V8t	Goodyear	11	55
41	1984	May 27	USAC	Indianapolis 500 (O)	6	(United States) Rick Mears (19)	March 84C	Cosworth DFX V8t	Goodyear	3	119
42	1985	May 26	USAC	Indianapolis 500 (O)	5	(United States) Danny Sullivan	March 85C	Cosworth DFX V8t	Goodyear	8	67
43	1985	August 18	CART	Pocono 500 (O)	5	(United States) Rick Mears (20)	March 85C	Cosworth DFX V8t	Goodyear	Pole	36
44	1985	October 13	CART	Phoenix International Raceway (O)	5	(United States) Al Unser (2)	March 85C	Cosworth DFX V8t	Goodyear	Pole	112
45	1985	November 9	CART	Tamiami Park (S)	4	(United States) Danny Sullivan (2)	March 85C	Cosworth DFX V8t	Goodyear	4	4
46	1986	June 29	CART	Meadowlands Sports Complex (S)	4	(United States) Danny Sullivan (3)	March 86C	Cosworth DFX V8t	Goodyear	5	26
47	1986	July 6	CART	Grand Prix of Cleveland (A)	4	(United States) Danny Sullivan (4)	March 86C	Cosworth DFX V8t	Goodyear	Pole	60
48	1987	May 24	USAC	Indianapolis 500 (O)	25	(United States) Al Unser (3)	March 86C	Cosworth DFX V8t	Goodyear	20	18
49	1987	August 16	CART	Pocono 500 (O)	8	(United States) Rick Mears (21)	March 86C	Chevrolet 265A V8t	Goodyear	2	80
50	1988	May 29	USAC	Indianapolis 500 (O)	5	(United States) Rick Mears (22)	Penske PC-17	Chevrolet 265A V8t	Goodyear	Pole	89
51	1988	June 5	CART	Milwaukee Mile (O)	5	(United States) Rick Mears (23)	Penske PC-17	Chevrolet 265A V8t	Goodyear	3	149
52	1988	June 19	CART	Grand Prix of Portland (R)	9	(United States) Danny Sullivan (5)	Penske PC-17	Chevrolet 265A V8t	Goodyear	Pole	46
53	1988	August 7	CART	Michigan 500 (O)	9	(United States) Danny Sullivan (6)	Penske PC-17	Chevrolet 265A V8t	Goodyear	5	92
54	1988	September 25	CART	Nazareth Speedway (O)	9	(United States) Danny Sullivan (7)	Penske PC-17	Chevrolet 265A V8t	Goodyear	Pole	74
55	1988	October 16	CART	Laguna Seca Raceway (R)	9	(United States) Danny Sullivan (8)	Penske PC-17	Chevrolet 265A V8t	Goodyear	Pole	70
56	1989	April 9	CART	Phoenix International Raceway (O)	4	(United States) Rick Mears (24)	Penske PC-18	Chevrolet 265A V8t	Goodyear	Pole	93
57	1989	June 4	CART	Milwaukee Mile (O)	4	(United States) Rick Mears (25)	Penske PC-18	Chevrolet 265A V8t	Goodyear	Pole	120
58	1989	August 20	CART	Pocono 500 (O)	1	(United States) Danny Sullivan (9)	Penske PC-18	Chevrolet 265A V8t	Goodyear	7	13
59	1989	September 10	CART	Road America (R)	1	(United States) Danny Sullivan (10)	Penske PC-18	Chevrolet 265A V8t	Goodyear	Pole	19
60	1989	October 15	CART	Laguna Seca Raceway (R)	4	(United States) Rick Mears (26)	Penske PC-18	Chevrolet 265A V8t	Goodyear	Pole	47
61	1990	April 8	CART	Phoenix International Raceway (O)	2	(United States) Rick Mears (27)	Penske PC-19	Chevrolet 265A V8t	Goodyear	Pole	132
62	1990	July 8	CART	Grand Prix of Cleveland (A)	7	(United States) Danny Sullivan (11)	Penske PC-19	Chevrolet 265A V8t	Goodyear	5	24
63	1990	October 7	CART	Nazareth Speedway (O)	1	(Brazil) Emerson Fittipaldi	Penske PC-19	Chevrolet 265A V8t	Goodyear	3	146
64	1990	October 21	CART	Laguna Seca Raceway (R)	7	(United States) Danny Sullivan (12)	Penske PC-19	Chevrolet 265A V8t	Goodyear	Pole	84
65	1991	May 26	USAC	Indianapolis 500 (O)	3	(United States) Rick Mears (28)	Penske PC-20	Chevrolet 265A V8t	Goodyear	Pole	30
66	1991	June 16	CART	Streets of Detroit (S)	5	(Brazil) Emerson Fittipaldi (2)	Penske PC-20	Chevrolet 265A V8t	Goodyear	2	22
67	1991	August 4	CART	Michigan 500 (O)	3	(United States) Rick Mears (29)	Penske PC-20	Chevrolet 265A V8t	Goodyear	Pole	71
68	1992	March 22	CART	Surfers Paradise Street Circuit (S)	5	(Brazil) Emerson Fittipaldi (3)	Penske PC-21	Chevrolet 265B V8t	Goodyear	3	3
69	1992	August 9	CART	Grand Prix of Cleveland (A)	5	(Brazil) Emerson Fittipaldi (4)	Penske PC-21	Chevrolet 265B V8t	Goodyear	Pole	67
70	1992	August 23	CART	Road America (R)	5	(Brazil) Emerson Fittipaldi (5)	Penske PC-21	Chevrolet 265B V8t	Goodyear	2	41
71	1992	September 13	CART	Mid-Ohio Sports Car Course (R)	5	(Brazil) Emerson Fittipaldi (6)	Penske PC-21	Chevrolet 265B V8t	Goodyear	3	37
NC	1992	October 3	CART	Nazareth Speedway (O)	5	(Brazil) Emerson Fittipaldi	Penske PC-21	Chevrolet 265B V8t	Goodyear	3	39
72	1993	April 18	CART	Streets of Long Beach (S)	12	(Canada) Paul Tracy	Penske PC-22	Chevrolet 265C V8t	Goodyear	2	81
73	1993	May 30	USAC	Indianapolis 500 (O)	4	(Brazil) Emerson Fittipaldi (7)	Penske PC-22	Chevrolet 265C V8t	Goodyear	9	16
74	1993	June 27	CART	Grand Prix of Portland (R)	4	(Brazil) Emerson Fittipaldi (8)	Penske PC-22	Chevrolet 265C V8t	Goodyear	2	70
75	1993	July 11	CART	Grand Prix of Cleveland (A)	12	(Canada) Paul Tracy (2)	Penske PC-22	Chevrolet 265C V8t	Goodyear	Pole	69
76	1993	July 18	CART	Exhibition Place Street Circuit (S)	12	(Canada) Paul Tracy (3)	Penske PC-22	Chevrolet 265C V8t	Goodyear	2	54
77	1993	August 23	CART	Road America (R)	12	(Canada) Paul Tracy (4)	Penske PC-22	Chevrolet 265C V8t	Goodyear	Pole	50
78	1993	September 12	CART	Mid-Ohio Sports Car Course (R)	4	(Brazil) Emerson Fittipaldi (9)	Penske PC-22	Chevrolet 265C V8t	Goodyear	3	69
79	1993	October 3	CART	Laguna Seca Raceway (R)	12	(Canada) Paul Tracy (5)	Penske PC-22	Chevrolet 265C V8t	Goodyear	2	80
80	1994	April 10	CART	Phoenix International Raceway (O)	2	(Brazil) Emerson Fittipaldi (10)	Penske PC-23	Ilmor 265D V8t	Goodyear	6	124
81	1994	April 17	CART	Grand Prix of Long Beach (S)	31	(United States) Al Unser Jr.	Penske PC-23	Ilmor 265D V8t	Goodyear	2	61
82	1994	May 29	USAC	Indianapolis 500 (O)	31	(United States) Al Unser Jr. (2)	Penske PC-23	Mercedes-Benz 500I V8t	Goodyear	Pole	48
83	1994	June 5	CART	Milwaukee Mile (O)	31	(United States) Al Unser Jr. (3)	Penske PC-23	Ilmor 265D V8t	Goodyear	11	155
84	1994	June 12	CART	Detroit Belle Isle Grand Prix (S)	3	(Canada) Paul Tracy (6)	Penske PC-23	Ilmor 265D V8t	Goodyear	3	24
85	1994	June 26	CART	Grand Prix of Portland (R)	31	(United States) Al Unser Jr. (4)	Penske PC-23	Ilmor 265D V8t	Goodyear	Pole	96
86	1994	July 10	CART	Grand Prix of Cleveland (A)	31	(United States) Al Unser Jr. (5)	Penske PC-23	Ilmor 265D V8t	Goodyear	Pole	82
87	1994	August 14	CART	Mid-Ohio Sports Car Course (R)	31	(United States) Al Unser Jr. (6)	Penske PC-23	Ilmor 265D V8t	Goodyear	Pole	26
88	1994	August 21	CART	New Hampshire Speedway (O)	31	(United States) Al Unser Jr. (7)	Penske PC-23	Ilmor 265D V8t	Goodyear	10	83
89	1994	September 4	CART	Streets of Vancouver (S)	31	(United States) Al Unser Jr. (8)	Penske PC-23	Ilmor 265D V8t	Goodyear	8	26
90	1994	September 18	CART	Nazareth Speedway (O)	3	(Canada) Paul Tracy (7)	Penske PC-23	Ilmor 265D V8t	Goodyear	2	192
91	1994	October 9	CART	Laguna Seca Raceway (R)	3	(Canada) Paul Tracy (8)	Penske PC-23	Ilmor 265D V8t	Goodyear	Pole	84
92	1995	April 9	CART	Grand Prix of Long Beach (S)	1	(United States) Al Unser Jr. (9)	Penske PC-24	Mercedes-Benz IC108B V8t	Goodyear	4	74
93	1995	April 23	CART	Nazareth Speedway (O)	2	(Brazil) Emerson Fittipaldi (11)	Penske PC-24	Mercedes-Benz IC108B V8t	Goodyear	4	38
94	1995	June 25	CART	Grand Prix of Portland (R)	1	(United States) Al Unser Jr. (10)	Penske PC-24	Mercedes-Benz IC108B V8t	Goodyear	3	76
95	1995	August 13	CART	Mid-Ohio Sports Car Course (R)	1	(United States) Al Unser Jr. (11)	Penske PC-24	Mercedes-Benz IC108B V8t	Goodyear	8	11
96	1995	September 3	CART	Streets of Vancouver (S)	1	(United States) Al Unser Jr. (12)	Penske PC-24	Mercedes-Benz IC108B V8t	Goodyear	9	40
97	1997	April 27	CART	Nazareth Speedway (O)	3	(Canada) Paul Tracy (9)	Penske PC-26	Mercedes-Benz IC108D V8t	Goodyear	Pole	186
98	1997	May 11	CART	Emerson Fittipaldi Speedway (O)	3	(Canada) Paul Tracy (10)	Penske PC-26	Mercedes-Benz IC108D V8t	Goodyear	5	3
99	1997	May 24	CART	Gateway International Raceway (O)	3	(Canada) Paul Tracy (11)	Penske PC-26	Mercedes-Benz IC108D V8t	Goodyear	2	25
100	2000	May 27	CART	Nazareth Speedway (O)	2	(Brazil) Gil de Ferran	Reynard 2Ki	Honda HR-0 V8t	Firestone	5	68
101	2000	June 18	CART	Detroit Belle Isle Grand Prix (S)	3	(Brazil) Hélio Castroneves	Reynard 2Ki	Honda HR-0 V8t	Firestone	3	24
102	2000	June 25	CART	Grand Prix of Portland (R)	2	(Brazil) Gil de Ferran (2)	Reynard 2Ki	Honda HR-0 V8t	Firestone	2	23
103	2000	August 13	CART	Mid-Ohio Sports Car Course (R)	3	(Brazil) Hélio Castroneves (2)	Reynard 2Ki	Honda HR-0 V8t	Firestone	2	55
104	2000	September 10	CART	Laguna Seca Raceway (R)	3	(Brazil) Hélio Castroneves (3)	Reynard 2Ki	Honda HR-0 V8t	Firestone	Pole	81
105	2001	April 8	CART	Grand Prix of Long Beach (S)	3	(Brazil) Hélio Castroneves (4)	Reynard 01i	Honda HR-1 V8t	Firestone	Pole	82
106	2001	May 27	IRL	Indianapolis 500 (O)	68	(Brazil) Hélio Castroneves (R) (5)	Dallara IR-01	Oldsmobile Aurora V8	Firestone	11	52
107	2001	June 17	CART	Detroit Belle Isle Grand Prix (S)	3	(Brazil) Hélio Castroneves (6)	Reynard 01i	Honda HR-1 V8t	Firestone	Pole	72
108	2001	August 12	CART	Mid-Ohio Sports Car Course (R)	3	(Brazil) Hélio Castroneves (7)	Reynard 01i	Honda HR-1 V8t	Firestone	2	44
109	2001	September 22	CART	Rockingham Motor Speedway (O)	1	(Brazil) Gil de Ferran (3)	Reynard 01i	Honda HR-1 V8t	Firestone	2	84
110	2001	October 7	CART	Grand Prix of Houston (S)	1	(Brazil) Gil de Ferran (4)	Reynard 01i	Honda HR-1 V8t	Firestone	Pole	100
111	2002	March 17	IRL	Phoenix International Raceway (O)	3	(Brazil) Hélio Castroneves (8)	Dallara IR-02	Chevrolet Indy V8	Firestone	Pole	62
112	2002	May 26	IRL	Indianapolis 500 (O)	3	(Brazil) Hélio Castroneves (9)	Dallara IR-02	Chevrolet Indy V8	Firestone	13	24
113	2002	June 16	IRL	Pikes Peak International Raceway (O)	6	(Brazil) Gil de Ferran (5)	Dallara IR-02	Chevrolet Indy V8	Firestone	Pole	217
114	2002	August 25	IRL	Gateway International Raceway (O)	6	(Brazil) Gil de Ferran (6)	Dallara IR-02	Chevrolet Indy V8	Firestone	Pole	81
115	2003	May 25	IndyCar	Indianapolis 500 (O)	6	(Brazil) Gil de Ferran (7)	G-Force GF09	Toyota Indy V8	Firestone	10	31
116	2003	July 19	IndyCar	Nashville Superspeedway (O)	6	(Brazil) Gil de Ferran (8)	Dallara IR-03	Toyota Indy V8	Firestone	4	49
117	2003	August 10	IndyCar	Gateway International Raceway (O)	3	(Brazil) Hélio Castroneves (10)	Dallara IR-03	Toyota Indy V8	Firestone	Pole	96
118	2003	August 24	IndyCar	Nazareth Speedway (O)	3	(Brazil) Hélio Castroneves (11)	Dallara IR-03	Toyota Indy V8	Firestone	2	173
119	2003	October 12	IndyCar	Texas Motor Speedway (O)	6	(Brazil) Gil de Ferran (9)	Dallara IR-03	Toyota Indy V8	Firestone	Pole	68
120	2004	February 29	IndyCar	Homestead-Miami Speedway (O)	6	(United States) Sam Hornish Jr.	Dallara IR-04	Toyota Indy V8	Firestone	7	6
121	2004	October 17	IndyCar	Texas Motor Speedway (O)	3	(Brazil) Hélio Castroneves (12)	Dallara IR-04	Toyota Indy V8	Firestone	Pole	104
122	2005	March 19	IndyCar	Phoenix International Raceway (O)	6	(United States) Sam Hornish Jr. (2)	Dallara IR-05	Toyota Indy V8	Firestone	6	25
123	2005	June 25	IndyCar	Richmond International Raceway (O)	3	(Brazil) Hélio Castroneves (13)	Dallara IR-05	Toyota Indy V8	Firestone	2	112
124	2005	July 24	IndyCar	Milwaukee Mile (O)	6	(United States) Sam Hornish Jr. (3)	Dallara IR-05	Toyota Indy V8	Firestone	Pole	123
125	2006	April 2	IndyCar	Streets of St. Petersburg (S)	3	(Brazil) Hélio Castroneves (14)	Dallara IR-05	Honda HI6R V8	Firestone	5	40
126	2006	April 22	IndyCar	Twin Ring Motegi (O)	3	(Brazil) Hélio Castroneves (15)	Dallara IR-05	Honda HI6R V8	Firestone	Pole	184
127	2006	May 28	IndyCar	Indianapolis Motor Speedway (O)	6	(United States) Sam Hornish Jr. (4)	Dallara IR-05	Honda HI6R V8	Firestone	Pole	19
128	2006	June 10	IndyCar	Texas Motor Speedway (O)	3	(Brazil) Hélio Castroneves (16)	Dallara IR-05	Honda HI6R V8	Firestone	3	8
129	2006	June 24	IndyCar	Richmond International Raceway (O)	6	(United States) Sam Hornish Jr. (5)	Dallara IR-05	Honda HI6R V8	Firestone	3	212
130	2006	July 2	IndyCar	Kansas Speedway (O)	6	(United States) Sam Hornish Jr. (6)	Dallara IR-05	Honda HI6R V8	Firestone	2	149
131	2006	July 30	IndyCar	Michigan International Speedway (O)	3	(Brazil) Hélio Castroneves (17)	Dallara IR-05	Honda HI6R V8	Firestone	Pole	61
132	2006	August 13	IndyCar	Kentucky Speedway (O)	6	(United States) Sam Hornish Jr. (7)	Dallara IR-05	Honda HI6R V8	Firestone	2	57
133	2007	April 1	IndyCar	Streets of St. Petersburg (S)	3	(Brazil) Hélio Castroneves (18)	Dallara IR-05	Honda HI7R V8	Firestone	Pole	95
134	2007	June 9	IndyCar	Texas Motor Speedway (O)	6	(United States) Sam Hornish Jr. (8)	Dallara IR-05	Honda HI7R V8	Firestone	2	159
135	2008	June 1	IndyCar	The Milwaukee Mile (O)	6	(Australia) Ryan Briscoe	Dallara IR-05	Honda HI8R V8	Firestone	11	36
136	2008	July 20	IndyCar	Mid-Ohio Sports Car Course (R)	6	(Australia) Ryan Briscoe (2)	Dallara IR-05	Honda HI8R V8	Firestone	2	43
137	2008	August 24	IndyCar	Infineon Raceway (R)	3	(Brazil) Hélio Castroneves (19)	Dallara IR-05	Honda HI8R V8	Firestone	Pole	51
138	2008	September 7	IndyCar	Chicagoland Speedway (O)	3	(Brazil) Hélio Castroneves (20)	Dallara IR-05	Honda HI8R V8	Firestone	28	80
NC	2008	October 26	IndyCar	Surfers Paradise Street Circuit (S)	6	(Australia) Ryan Briscoe	Dallara IR-05	Honda HI8R V8	Firestone	3	39
139	2009	April 5	IndyCar	Streets of St. Petersburg (S)	6	(Australia) Ryan Briscoe (3)	Dallara IR-05	Honda HI9R V8	Firestone	4	46
140	2009	May 24	IndyCar	Indianapolis Motor Speedway (O)	3	(Brazil) Hélio Castroneves (21)	Dallara IR-05	Honda HI9R V8	Firestone	Pole	66
141	2009	June 6	IndyCar	Texas Motor Speedway (O)	3	(Brazil) Hélio Castroneves (22)	Dallara IR-05	Honda HI9R V8	Firestone	4	57
142	2009	July 26	IndyCar	Edmonton City Centre Airport (A)	12	(Australia) Will Power	Dallara IR-05	Honda HI9R V8	Firestone	Pole	90
143	2009	August 1	IndyCar	Kentucky Speedway (O)	6	(Australia) Ryan Briscoe (4)	Dallara IR-05	Honda HI9R V8	Firestone	3	37
144	2009	August 29	IndyCar	Chicagoland Speedway (O)	6	(Australia) Ryan Briscoe (5)	Dallara IR-05	Honda HI9R V8	Firestone	Pole	71
145	2010	March 14	IndyCar	Streets of São Paulo (S)	12	(Australia) Will Power (2)	Dallara IR-05	Honda HI10R V8	Firestone	5	4
146	2010	March 29	IndyCar	Streets of St. Petersburg (S)	12	(Australia) Will Power (3)	Dallara IR-05	Honda HI10R V8	Firestone	Pole	50
147	2010	April 11	IndyCar	Barber Motorsports Park (S)	3	(Brazil) Hélio Castroneves (23)	Dallara IR-05	Honda HI10R V8	Firestone	3	20
148	2010	June 5	IndyCar	Texas Motor Speedway (O)	6	(Australia) Ryan Briscoe (6)	Dallara IR-05	Honda HI10R V8	Firestone	Pole	102
149	2010	July 4	IndyCar	Watkins Glen International (S)	12	(Australia) Will Power (4)	Dallara IR-05	Honda HI10R V8	Firestone	Pole	45
150	2010	July 18	IndyCar	Exhibition Place (S)	12	(Australia) Will Power (5)	Dallara IR-05	Honda HI10R V8	Firestone	2	15
151	2010	August 22	IndyCar	Infineon Raceway (S)	12	(Australia) Will Power (6)	Dallara IR-05	Honda HI10R V8	Firestone	Pole	73
152	2010	September 4	IndyCar	Kentucky Speedway (O)	3	(Brazil) Hélio Castroneves (24)	Dallara IR-05	Honda HI10R V8	Firestone	8	7
153	2010	September 18	IndyCar	Twin Ring Motegi (O)	3	(Brazil) Hélio Castroneves (25)	Dallara IR-05	Honda HI10R V8	Firestone	Pole	153
154	2011	April 10	IndyCar	Barber Motorsports Park (R)	12	(Australia) Will Power (7)	Dallara IR-05	Honda HI11R V8	Firestone	Pole	90
155	2011	May 1–2	IndyCar	Streets of São Paulo (S)	12	(Australia) Will Power (8)	Dallara IR-05	Honda HI11R V8	Firestone	Pole	32
156	2011	June 11	IndyCar	Texas Motor Speedway Race 2 (O)	12	(Australia) Will Power (9)	Dallara IR-05	Honda HI11R V8	Firestone	3	68
157	2011	July 24	IndyCar	Edmonton City Centre Airport (S)	12	(Australia) Will Power (10)	Dallara IR-05	Honda HI11R V8	Firestone	2	57
158	2011	August 28	IndyCar	Infineon Raceway (R)	12	(Australia) Will Power (11)	Dallara IR-05	Honda HI11R V8	Firestone	Pole	71
159	2011	September 4	IndyCar	Streets of Baltimore (S)	12	(Australia) Will Power (12)	Dallara IR-05	Honda HI11R V8	Firestone	Pole	70
160	2012	March 25	IndyCar	Streets of St. Petersburg (S)	3	(Brazil) Hélio Castroneves (26)	Dallara DW12	Chevrolet IndyCar V6t	Firestone	5	28
161	2012	April 1	IndyCar	Barber Motorsports Park (S)	12	(Australia) Will Power (13)	Dallara DW12	Chevrolet IndyCar V6t	Firestone	9	22
162	2012	April 15	IndyCar	Streets of Long Beach (S)	12	(Australia) Will Power (14)	Dallara DW12	Chevrolet IndyCar V6t	Firestone	12	15
163	2012	April 29	IndyCar	Streets of São Paulo (S)	12	(Australia) Will Power (15)	Dallara DW12	Chevrolet IndyCar V6t	Firestone	Pole	63
164	2012	July 22	IndyCar	Edmonton City Centre Airport (S)	3	(Brazil) Hélio Castroneves (27)	Dallara DW12	Chevrolet IndyCar V6t	Firestone	5	22
165	2012	August 26	IndyCar	Sonoma Raceway (S)	2	(Australia) Ryan Briscoe (7)	Dallara DW12	Chevrolet IndyCar V6t	Firestone	2	27
166	2013	June 8	IndyCar	Texas Motor Speedway (O)	3	(Brazil) Hélio Castroneves (28)	Dallara DW12	Chevrolet IndyCar V6t	Firestone	6	132
167	2013	August 25	IndyCar	Sonoma Raceway (R)	12	(Australia) Will Power (16)	Dallara DW12	Chevrolet IndyCar V6t	Firestone	3	16
168	2013	October 6	IndyCar	Reliant Park Race 2 (S)	12	(Australia) Will Power (17)	Dallara DW12	Chevrolet IndyCar V6t	Firestone	9	51
169	2013	October 19	IndyCar	Auto Club Speedway (O)	12	(Australia) Will Power (18)	Dallara DW12	Chevrolet IndyCar V6t	Firestone	Pole	103
170	2014	March 30	IndyCar	Streets of St. Petersburg (S)	12	(Australia) Will Power (19)	Dallara DW12	Chevrolet IndyCar V6t	Firestone	4	74
171	2014	May 31	IndyCar	Belle Isle Race 1 (S)	12	(Australia) Will Power (20)	Dallara DW12	Chevrolet IndyCar V6t	Firestone	16	21
172	2014	June 1	IndyCar	Belle Isle Race 2 (S)	3	(Brazil) Hélio Castroneves (29)	Dallara DW12	Chevrolet IndyCar V6t	Firestone	3	42
173	2014	July 6	IndyCar	Pocono Raceway (O)	2	(Colombia) Juan Pablo Montoya	Dallara DW12	Chevrolet IndyCar V6t	Firestone	Pole	45
174	2014	August 17	IndyCar	The Milwaukee Mile (O)	12	(Australia) Will Power (21)	Dallara DW12	Chevrolet IndyCar V6t	Firestone	Pole	229
175	2015	March 29	IndyCar	Streets of St. Petersburg (R)	2	(Colombia) Juan Pablo Montoya (2)	Dallara DW12	Chevrolet IndyCar V6t	Firestone	4	27
176	2015	May 9	IndyCar	Indianapolis Motor Speedway (R)	1	(Australia) Will Power (22)	Dallara DW12	Chevrolet IndyCar V6t	Firestone	Pole	65
177	2015	May 24	IndyCar	Indianapolis Motor Speedway (O)	2	(Colombia) Juan Pablo Montoya (3)	Dallara DW12	Chevrolet IndyCar V6t	Firestone	15	9
178	2016	March 13	IndyCar	Streets of St. Petersburg (R)	2	(Colombia) Juan Pablo Montoya (4)	Dallara DW12	Chevrolet IndyCar V6t	Firestone	3	44
179	2016	April 17	IndyCar	Streets of Long Beach (R)	22	(France) Simon Pagenaud	Dallara DW12	Chevrolet IndyCar V6t	Firestone	3	28
180	2016	April 24	IndyCar	Barber Motorsports Park (R)	22	(France) Simon Pagenaud (2)	Dallara DW12	Chevrolet IndyCar V6t	Firestone	Pole	84
181	2016	May 14	IndyCar	Indianapolis Motor Speedway (R)	22	(France) Simon Pagenaud (3)	Dallara DW12	Chevrolet IndyCar V6t	Firestone	Pole	57
182	2016	June 5	IndyCar	Belle Isle Park Race 2 (R)	12	(Australia) Will Power (23)	Dallara DW12	Chevrolet IndyCar V6t	Firestone	8	10
183	2016	June 26	IndyCar	Road America (R)	12	(Australia) Will Power (24)	Dallara DW12	Chevrolet IndyCar V6t	Firestone	Pole	46
184	2016	July 17	IndyCar	Exhibition Place (R)	12	(Australia) Will Power (25)	Dallara DW12	Chevrolet IndyCar V6t	Firestone	4	10
185	2016	July 31	IndyCar	Mid-Ohio Sports Car Course (R)	22	(France) Simon Pagenaud (4)	Dallara DW12	Chevrolet IndyCar V6t	Firestone	Pole	23
186	2016	August 22	IndyCar	Pocono Raceway (O)	12	(Australia) Will Power (26)	Dallara DW12	Chevrolet IndyCar V6t	Firestone	8	55
187	2016	September 18	IndyCar	Sonoma Raceway (R)	22	(France) Simon Pagenaud (5)	Dallara DW12	Chevrolet IndyCar V6t	Firestone	Pole	76
188	2017	April 23	IndyCar	Barber Motorsports Park (R)	2	(United States) Josef Newgarden	Dallara DW12	Chevrolet IndyCar V6t	Firestone	7	14
189	2017	April 29	IndyCar	Phoenix International Raceway (O)	1	(France) Simon Pagenaud (6)	Dallara DW12	Chevrolet IndyCar V6t	Firestone	5	116
190	2017	May 13	IndyCar	Indianapolis Motor Speedway (R)	12	(Australia) Will Power (27)	Dallara DW12	Chevrolet IndyCar V6t	Firestone	Pole	61
191	2017	June 10	IndyCar	Texas Motor Speedway (O)	12	(Australia) Will Power (28)	Dallara DW12	Chevrolet IndyCar V6t	Firestone	9	180
192	2017	July 9	IndyCar	Iowa Speedway (O)	3	(Brazil) Hélio Castroneves (30)	Dallara DW12	Chevrolet IndyCar V6t	Firestone	3	217
193	2017	July 16	IndyCar	Honda Indy Toronto (S)	2	(United States) Josef Newgarden (2)	Dallara DW12	Chevrolet IndyCar V6t	Firestone	7	58
194	2017	July 30	IndyCar	Mid-Ohio Sports Car Course (R)	2	(United States) Josef Newgarden (3)	Dallara DW12	Chevrolet IndyCar V6t	Firestone	2	73
195	2017	August 20	IndyCar	Pocono Raceway (O)	12	(Australia) Will Power (29)	Dallara DW12	Chevrolet IndyCar V6t	Firestone	5	34
196	2017	August 26	IndyCar	Gateway Motorsports Park (O)	12	(United States) Josef Newgarden (4)	Dallara DW12	Chevrolet IndyCar V6t	Firestone	2	170
197	2017	September 17	IndyCar	Sonoma Raceway (R)	1	(France) Simon Pagenaud (7)	Dallara DW12	Chevrolet IndyCar V6t	Firestone	3	41
198	2018	April 7	IndyCar	Phoenix International Raceway (O)	1	(United States) Josef Newgarden (5)	Dallara DW12	Chevrolet IndyCar V6t	Firestone	7	30
199	2018	April 23	IndyCar	Barber Motorsports Park (R)	1	(United States) Josef Newgarden (6)	Dallara DW12	Chevrolet IndyCar V6t	Firestone	Pole	73
200	2018	May 12	IndyCar	Indianapolis Motor Speedway (R)	12	(Australia) Will Power (30)	Dallara DW12	Chevrolet IndyCar V6t	Firestone	Pole	56
201	2018	May 27	IndyCar	Indianapolis Motor Speedway (O)	12	(Australia) Will Power (31)	Dallara DW12	Chevrolet IndyCar V6t	Firestone	3	59
202	2018	June 24	IndyCar	Road America (R)	1	(United States) Josef Newgarden (7)	Dallara DW12	Chevrolet IndyCar V6t	Firestone	Pole	53
203	2018	August 25	IndyCar	Gateway Motorsports Park (O)	12	(Australia) Will Power (32)	Dallara DW12	Chevrolet IndyCar V6t	Firestone	4	93
204	2019	March 10	IndyCar	Streets of St. Petersburg (S)	2	(United States) Josef Newgarden (8)	Dallara DW12	Chevrolet IndyCar V6t	Firestone	2	60
205	2019	May 11	IndyCar	Indianapolis Motor Speedway (R)	22	(France) Simon Pagenaud (8)	Dallara DW12	Chevrolet IndyCar V6t	Firestone	8	5
206	2019	May 26	IndyCar	Indianapolis Motor Speedway (O)	22	(France) Simon Pagenaud (9)	Dallara DW12	Chevrolet IndyCar V6t	Firestone	Pole	116
207	2019	June 1	IndyCar	The Raceway on Belle Isle Race 1 (S)	2	(United States) Josef Newgarden (9)	Dallara DW12	Chevrolet IndyCar V6t	Firestone	2	25
208	2019	June 8	IndyCar	Texas Motor Speedway (O)	2	(United States) Josef Newgarden (10)	Dallara DW12	Chevrolet IndyCar V6t	Firestone	7	54
209	2019	July 14	IndyCar	Exhibition Place (S)	22	(France) Simon Pagenaud (10)	Dallara DW12	Chevrolet IndyCar V6t	Firestone	Pole	80
210	2019	July 21	IndyCar	Iowa Speedway (O)	2	(United States) Josef Newgarden (11)	Dallara DW12	Chevrolet IndyCar V6t	Firestone	3	245
211	2019	August 18	IndyCar	Pocono Raceway (O)	12	(Australia) Will Power (33)	Dallara DW12	Chevrolet IndyCar V6t	Firestone	5	31
212	2019	September 1	IndyCar	Portland International Raceway (R)	12	(Australia) Will Power (34)	Dallara DW12	Chevrolet IndyCar V6t	Firestone	2	52
213	2020	July 17	IndyCar	Iowa Speedway Race 1 (O)	22	(France) Simon Pagenaud (11)	Dallara DW12	Chevrolet IndyCar V6t	Firestone	23	83
214	2020	July 18	IndyCar	Iowa Speedway Race 2 (O)	1	(United States) Josef Newgarden (12)	Dallara DW12	Chevrolet IndyCar V6t	Firestone	Pole	214
215	2020	August 30	IndyCar	World Wide Technology Raceway Race 2 (O)	1	(United States) Josef Newgarden (13)	Dallara DW12	Chevrolet IndyCar V6t	Firestone	2	48
216	2020	September 12	IndyCar	Mid-Ohio Sports Car Course Race 1 (R)	12	(Australia) Will Power (35)	Dallara DW12	Chevrolet IndyCar V6t	Firestone	Pole	66
217	2020	October 2	IndyCar	Harvest GP Race 1 (R)	1	(United States) Josef Newgarden (14)	Dallara DW12	Chevrolet IndyCar V6t	Firestone	2	34
218	2020	October 3	IndyCar	Harvest GP Race 2 (R)	12	(Australia) Will Power (36)	Dallara DW12	Chevrolet IndyCar V6t	Firestone	Pole	75
219	2020	October 25	IndyCar	Streets of St. Petersburg (S)	1	(United States) Josef Newgarden (15)	Dallara DW12	Chevrolet IndyCar V6t	Firestone	8	21
220	2021	July 4	IndyCar	Mid-Ohio Sports Car Course (R)	2	(United States) Josef Newgarden (16)	Dallara DW12	Chevrolet IndyCar V6t	Firestone	Pole	73
221	2021	August 14	IndyCar	Indianapolis Motor Speedway (R)	12	(Australia) Will Power (37)	Dallara DW12	Chevrolet IndyCar V6t	Firestone	2	56
222	2021	August 21	IndyCar	Gateway International Raceway (O)	2	(United States) Josef Newgarden (17)	Dallara DW12	Chevrolet IndyCar V6t	Firestone	3	138
223	2022	February 27	IndyCar	Streets of St. Petersburg (S)	3	(New Zealand) Scott McLaughlin	Dallara DW12	Chevrolet IndyCar V6t	Firestone	Pole	49
224	2022	March 20	IndyCar	Texas Motor Speedway (O)	2	(United States) Josef Newgarden (18)	Dallara DW12	Chevrolet IndyCar V6t	Firestone	7	3
225	2022	April 10	IndyCar	Streets of Long Beach (S)	2	(United States) Josef Newgarden (19)	Dallara DW12	Chevrolet IndyCar V6t	Firestone	2	32
226	2022	June 5	IndyCar	Chevrolet Detroit Grand Prix (S)	12	(Australia) Will Power (38)	Dallara DW12	Chevrolet IndyCar V6t	Firestone	16	55
227	2022	June 12	IndyCar	Road America (R)	2	(United States) Josef Newgarden (20)	Dallara DW12	Chevrolet IndyCar V6t	Firestone	2	26
228	2022	July 3	IndyCar	Mid-Ohio Sports Car Course (R)	3	(New Zealand) Scott McLaughlin (2)	Dallara DW12	Chevrolet IndyCar V6t	Firestone	2	45
229	2022	July 23	IndyCar	Iowa Speedway (O)	2	(United States) Josef Newgarden (21)	Dallara DW12	Chevrolet IndyCar V6t	Firestone	2	208
230	2022	August 20	IndyCar	Gateway Motorsports Park (O)	2	(United States) Josef Newgarden (22)	Dallara DW12	Chevrolet IndyCar V6t	Firestone	3	78
231	2022	September 4	IndyCar	Portland International Raceway (R)	3	(New Zealand) Scott McLaughlin (3)	Dallara DW12	Chevrolet IndyCar V6t	Firestone	Pole	104
232	2023	April 2	IndyCar	Texas Motor Speedway (O)	2	(United States) Josef Newgarden (23)	Dallara DW12	Chevrolet IndyCar V6t	Firestone	4	123
233	2023	April 30	IndyCar	Barber Motorsports Park (R)	3	(New Zealand) Scott McLaughlin (4)	Dallara DW12	Chevrolet IndyCar V6t	Firestone	4	24
234	2023	May 28	IndyCar	Indianapolis Motor Speedway (O)	2	(United States) Josef Newgarden (24)	Dallara DW12	Chevrolet IndyCar V6t	Firestone	17	5
235	2023	July 22	IndyCar	Iowa Speedway Race 1 (O)	2	(United States) Josef Newgarden (25)	Dallara DW12	Chevrolet IndyCar V6t	Firestone	3	129
236	2023	July 23	IndyCar	Iowa Speedway Race 2 (O)	2	(United States) Josef Newgarden (26)	Dallara DW12	Chevrolet IndyCar V6t	Firestone	7	212
237	2024	April 28	IndyCar	Barber Motorsports Park (R)	3	(New Zealand) Scott McLaughlin (5)	Dallara DW12	Chevrolet IndyCar V6t	Firestone	Pole	58
238	2024	May 26	IndyCar	Indianapolis Motor Speedway (O)	2	(United States) Josef Newgarden (27)	Dallara DW12	Chevrolet IndyCar V6t	Firestone	3	26
239	2024	June 9	IndyCar	Road America (R)	12	(Australia) Will Power (39)	Dallara DW12	Chevrolet IndyCar V6t	Firestone	5	9
240	2024	July 13	IndyCar	Iowa Speedway Race 1 (O)	3	(New Zealand) Scott McLaughlin (6)	Dallara DW12	Chevrolet IndyCar V6t	Firestone	2	164
241	2024	July 14	IndyCar	Iowa Speedway Race 2 (O)	12	(Australia) Will Power (40)	Dallara DW12	Chevrolet IndyCar V6t	Firestone	22	51
242	2024	August 17	IndyCar	Gateway Motorsports Park (O)	2	(United States) Josef Newgarden (28)	Dallara DW12	Chevrolet IndyCar V6t	Firestone	3	17
243	2024	August 25	IndyCar	Portland International Raceway (R)	12	(Australia) Will Power (41)	Dallara DW12	Chevrolet IndyCar V6t	Firestone	2	101
244	2024	September 1	IndyCar	Milwaukee Mile Race 2 (O)	3	(New Zealand) Scott McLaughlin (7)	Dallara DW12	Chevrolet IndyCar V6t	Firestone	2	85
245	2025	August 10	IndyCar	Portland International Raceway (R)	12	(Australia) Will Power (42)	Dallara DW12	Chevrolet IndyCar V6t	Firestone	3	78
246	2025	August 31	IndyCar	Nashville Superspeedway (O)	2	(United States) Josef Newgarden (29)	Dallara DW12	Chevrolet IndyCar V6t	Firestone	6	60
247	2026	March 7	IndyCar	Phoenix Raceway (O)	2	(United States) Josef Newgarden (30)	Dallara DW12	Chevrolet IndyCar V6t	Firestone	2	8
248	2026	June 7	IndyCar	Gateway Motorsports Park (O)	2	(United States) Josef Newgarden (31)	Dallara DW12	Chevrolet IndyCar V6t	Firestone	8	53
249	2026	September 6	IndyCar	Laguna Seca (R)	3	(New Zealand) Scott McLaughlin (8)	Dallara DW12	Chevrolet IndyCar V6t	Firestone	Pole	87

=== WeatherTech SportsCar Championship wins ===
#	Season	Date	Class	Track	No.	Winning drivers	Chassis	Engine
1	2018	May 6	Prototype	Mid-Ohio	7	(Brazil) Hélio Castroneves / (United States) Ricky Taylor	Acura ARX-05	Acura AR35TT 3.5 L Turbo V6
2	2019	May 5	(DPi)	Mid-Ohio	6	(United States) Dane Cameron / (Colombia) Juan Pablo Montoya	Acura ARX-05	Acura AR35TT 3.5 L Turbo V6
3	2019	June 1	(DPi)	Belle Isle	6	(United States) Dane Cameron / (Colombia) Juan Pablo Montoya	Acura ARX-05	Acura AR35TT 3.5 L Turbo V6
4	2019	September 15	(DPi)	Laguna Seca	6	(United States) Dane Cameron / (Colombia) Juan Pablo Montoya	Acura ARX-05	Acura AR35TT 3.5 L Turbo V6
5	2020	August 2	(DPi)	Road America	7	(Brazil) Hélio Castroneves / (United States) Ricky Taylor	Acura ARX-05	Acura AR35TT 3.5 L Turbo V6
6	2020	September 5	(DPi)	Road Atlanta	7	(Brazil) Hélio Castroneves / (United States) Ricky Taylor	Acura ARX-05	Acura AR35TT 3.5 L Turbo V6
7	2020	September 27	(DPi)	Mid-Ohio	7	(Brazil) Hélio Castroneves / (United States) Ricky Taylor	Acura ARX-05	Acura AR35TT 3.5 L Turbo V6
8	2020	November 1	(DPi)	Laguna Seca	7	(Brazil) Hélio Castroneves / (United States) Ricky Taylor	Acura ARX-05	Acura AR35TT 3.5 L Turbo V6
9	2023	April 15	(GTP)	Streets of Long Beach	6	(France) Mathieu Jaminet / (United Kingdom) Nick Tandy	Porsche 963	Porsche 9RD 4.6 L Turbo V8
10	2023	August 6	(GTP)	Road America	7	(Australia) Matt Campbell / (Brazil) Felipe Nasr	Porsche 963	Porsche 9RD 4.6 L Turbo V8
11	2023	September 17	(GTP)	Indianapolis Motor Speedway	6	(France) Mathieu Jaminet / (United Kingdom) Nick Tandy	Porsche 963	Porsche 9RD 4.6 L Turbo V8
12	2024	January 27–28	(GTP)	Daytona International Speedway	7	(United States) Dane Cameron / (Australia) Matt Campbell / (Brazil) Felipe Nasr / (United States) Josef Newgarden	Porsche 963	Porsche 9RD 4.6 L Turbo V8
13	2024	May 12	(GTP)	Laguna Seca	6	(France) Mathieu Jaminet / (United Kingdom) Nick Tandy	Porsche 963	Porsche 9RD 4.6 L Turbo V8
14	2024	June 23	(GTP)	Watkins Glen	7	(United States) Dane Cameron / (Brazil) Felipe Nasr	Porsche 963	Porsche 9RD 4.6 L Turbo V8
15	2024	August 4	(GTP)	Road America	6	(France) Mathieu Jaminet / (United Kingdom) Nick Tandy	Porsche 963	Porsche 9RD 4.6 L Turbo V8
16	2025	January 25 / 26	(GTP)	Daytona International Speedway	7	(Brazil) Felipe Nasr / (United Kingdom) Nick Tandy / (Belgium) Laurens Vanthoor	Porsche 963	Porsche 9RD 4.6 L Turbo V8
17	2025	March 15	(GTP)	Sebring International Raceway	7	(Brazil) Felipe Nasr / (United Kingdom) Nick Tandy / (Belgium) Laurens Vanthoor	Porsche 963	Porsche 9RD 4.6 L Turbo V8
18	2025	April 12	(GTP)	Streets of Long Beach	7	(Brazil) Felipe Nasr / (United Kingdom) Nick Tandy	Porsche 963	Porsche 9RD 4.6 L Turbo V8
19	2025	May 11	(GTP)	Laguna Seca	6	(France) Mathieu Jaminet / (Australia) Matt Campbell	Porsche 963	Porsche 9RD 4.6 L Turbo V8
20	2026	January 24 / 25	(GTP)	Daytona International Speedway	7	(Brazil) Felipe Nasr / (Germany) Laurin Heinrich / (France) Julien Andlauer	Porsche 963	Porsche 9RD 4.6 L Turbo V8
21	2026	March 21	(GTP)	Sebring International Raceway	7	(Brazil) Felipe Nasr / (Germany) Laurin Heinrich / (France) Julien Andlauer	Porsche 963	Porsche 9RD 4.6 L Turbo V8

=== NASCAR Cup Series champions ===
Year	Driver	Wins	Chassis	Tires
2012	(United States) Brad Keselowski	5	Dodge Charger	Goodyear
2018	(United States) Joey Logano	3	Ford Fusion	Goodyear
2022	(United States) Joey Logano (2)	4	Ford Mustang	Goodyear
2023	(United States) Ryan Blaney	3	Ford Mustang	Goodyear
2024	(United States) Joey Logano (3)	4	Ford Mustang	Goodyear

=== NASCAR Xfinity Series champions ===
Year	Driver	Wins	Chassis	Tires
2010	(United States) Brad Keselowski	6	Dodge Charger/Challenger	Goodyear
2020	(United States) Austin Cindric	6	Ford Mustang	Goodyear

=== Daytona 500 victories ===
Year	Driver	Chassis	Tires
2008	(United States) Ryan Newman	Dodge Charger	Goodyear
2015	(United States) Joey Logano	Ford Fusion	Goodyear
2022	(United States) Austin Cindric	Ford Mustang	Goodyear

=== Supercars champions ===
Year	Driver	Wins	Chassis	Tires
2018	(New Zealand) Scott McLaughlin	9	Ford Falcon	Dunlop
2019	(New Zealand) Scott McLaughlin (2)	18	Ford Mustang	Dunlop
2020	(New Zealand) Scott McLaughlin (3)	13	Ford Mustang	Dunlop

== Bibliography ==
- Hummel, Alan (August 14, 2007). Penske Racing Team: 40 Years of Excellence. Iconografix. ISBN 978-1583881958.
