= 2009 Rolex Sports Car Series =

10th season of the racing series organized by Grand-Am

Seasons
- ← 2008 2010 →

The 2009 Rolex Sports Car Series season is the tenth season of the Grand-Am Rolex Sports Car Series presented by Crown Royal Cask No. 16. It is a 12-race schedule beginning at the Rolex 24 at Daytona and ending at Homestead-Miami Speedway. Miami has been moved from early in the schedule to the end, as it will continue in the joint weekend with the IndyCar Series race, which has also been moved to a season closing race. All races will feature both classes. The race at Miller Motorsports Park has been changed from a 1000 kilometers race to a 250-mile race. New Jersey Motorsports Park will be moved from Labor Day weekend to May 3. Infineon Raceway, Hermanos Rodriguez, and Lime Rock have been dropped from the schedule, leaving Montreal as the only race outside the US.

The main Daytona Prototype class was won by the GAINSCO/Bob Stallings Racing pairing of Jon Fogarty and Alex Gurney after a three-way title battle with Chip Ganassi Racing with Felix Sabates duo Scott Pruett and Memo Rojas, and SunTrust Racing's Max Angelelli and Brian Frisselle. Leh Keen and Dirk Werner were comfortable champions in the secondary GT class. Riley Technologies, Ford and Porsche won other titles for highest scoring chassis makers and highest scoring engine manufacturers.

== Entry list ==
Team	No	Drivers	Chassis Engine	Class	Rounds
Chip Ganassi Racing with Felix Sabates	01	(United States) Scott Pruett	Riley Mk. XX; Lexus 5.0L V8	DP	All
Chip Ganassi Racing with Felix Sabates	01	(Mexico) Memo Rojas	Riley Mk. XX; Lexus 5.0L V8	DP	All
Chip Ganassi Racing with Felix Sabates	01	(Colombia) Juan Pablo Montoya	Riley Mk. XX; Lexus 5.0L V8	DP	1
Chip Ganassi Racing with Felix Sabates	02	(United Kingdom) Dario Franchitti	Riley Mk. XI; Lexus 5.0L V8	DP	1
Chip Ganassi Racing with Felix Sabates	02	(United Kingdom) Alex Lloyd	Riley Mk. XI; Lexus 5.0L V8	DP	1
Chip Ganassi Racing with Felix Sabates	02	(New Zealand) Scott Dixon	Riley Mk. XI; Lexus 5.0L V8	DP	1
Chip Ganassi Racing with Felix Sabates	02	(United States) Kyle Busch	Riley Mk. XI; Lexus 5.0L V8	DP	7
Chip Ganassi Racing with Felix Sabates	02	(United States) Scott Speed	Riley Mk. XI; Lexus 5.0L V8	DP	7
Team Drinkin' Mate	07	(United States) Kelly Collins	Pontiac GXP.R; Pontiac 6.0L V8	GT	All
Team Drinkin' Mate	07	(United States) Paul Edwards	Pontiac GXP.R; Pontiac 6.0L V8	GT	1–8, 10–12
Team Drinkin' Mate	07	(Denmark) Jan Magnussen	Pontiac GXP.R; Pontiac 6.0L V8	GT	1
Team Drinkin' Mate	07	(United States) Leighton Reese	Pontiac GXP.R; Pontiac 6.0L V8	GT	9
Spirit of Daytona Racing	09	(United States) Guy Cosmo	Coyote CC/08; Porsche 5.0L V8	DP	1–3, 5–7
Spirit of Daytona Racing	09	(United States) Scott Russell	Coyote CC/08; Porsche 5.0L V8	DP	1–3, 5–7
Spirit of Daytona Racing	09	(United States) Jeff Ward	Coyote CC/08; Porsche 5.0L V8	DP	1
Spirit of Daytona Racing	09	(United States) Jason Pridmore	Coyote CC/08; Porsche 5.0L V8	DP	1
Spirit of Daytona Racing	09	(Spain) Antonio García	Coyote CC/08; Porsche 5.0L V8	DP	8
Spirit of Daytona Racing	09	(United States) Buddy Rice	Coyote CC/08; Porsche 5.0L V8	DP	8
Spirit of Daytona Racing	90	(Spain) Antonio García	Coyote CC/09; Porsche 5.0L V8	DP	7, 9–10, 12
Spirit of Daytona Racing	90	(United States) Buddy Rice	Coyote CC/09; Porsche 5.0L V8	DP	7, 9–10, 12
Childress-Howard Motorsports	2	(United Kingdom) Andy Wallace	Crawford DP08; Pontiac/Chevrolet 5.0L V8	DP	All
Childress-Howard Motorsports	2	(United States) Rob Finlay	Crawford DP08; Pontiac/Chevrolet 5.0L V8	DP	All
Childress-Howard Motorsports	2	(United States) Casey Mears	Crawford DP08; Pontiac/Chevrolet 5.0L V8	DP	1
Childress-Howard Motorsports	2	(United States) Danica Patrick	Crawford DP08; Pontiac/Chevrolet 5.0L V8	DP	1
Beyer Racing	5	(United States) Jared Beyer	Riley Mk. XI/Crawford DP08; Honda 3.9L V6/Chevrolet 5.0L V8	DP	4, 6–9, 12
Beyer Racing	5	(United States) Jordan Taylor	Riley Mk. XI/Crawford DP08; Honda 3.9L V6/Chevrolet 5.0L V8	DP	4, 6–9
Beyer Racing	5	(Canada) Mike Forest	Riley Mk. XI/Crawford DP08; Honda 3.9L V6/Chevrolet 5.0L V8	DP	12
Beyer Racing	13	(United States) Jared Beyer	Riley Mk. XI; Pontiac/Chevrolet 5.0L V8	DP	1–3
Beyer Racing	13	(United States) Ricky Taylor	Riley Mk. XI; Pontiac/Chevrolet 5.0L V8	DP	All
Beyer Racing	13	(United States) Jordan Taylor	Riley Mk. XI; Pontiac/Chevrolet 5.0L V8	DP	1, 5, 12
Beyer Racing	13	(Mexico) David Martínez	Riley Mk. XI; Pontiac/Chevrolet 5.0L V8	DP	1
Beyer Racing	13	(Canada) Mike Forest	Riley Mk. XI; Pontiac/Chevrolet 5.0L V8	DP	4–11
Michael Shank Racing	6	(United States) John Pew	Riley Mk. XX; Ford 5.0L V8	DP	All
Michael Shank Racing	6	(Canada) Michael Valiante	Riley Mk. XX; Ford 5.0L V8	DP	All
Michael Shank Racing	6	(United Kingdom) Ian James	Riley Mk. XX; Ford 5.0L V8	DP	1
Michael Shank Racing	6	(United States) A. J. Allmendinger	Riley Mk. XX; Ford 5.0L V8	DP	1
Michael Shank Racing	60	(South Africa) Mark Patterson	Riley Mk. XX; Ford 5.0L V8	DP	All
Michael Shank Racing	60	(Brazil) Oswaldo Negri Jr.	Riley Mk. XX; Ford 5.0L V8	DP	All
Michael Shank Racing	60	(United States) Ryan Hunter-Reay	Riley Mk. XX; Ford 5.0L V8	DP	1
Michael Shank Racing	60	(United States) Colin Braun	Riley Mk. XX; Ford 5.0L V8	DP	1
SunTrust Racing	10	(Italy) Max Angelelli	Dallara DP08; Ford 5.0L V8	DP	All
SunTrust Racing	10	(United States) Brian Frisselle	Dallara DP08; Ford 5.0L V8	DP	All
SunTrust Racing	10	(South Africa) Wayne Taylor	Dallara DP08; Ford 5.0L V8	DP	1
SunTrust Racing	10	(Portugal) Pedro Lamy	Dallara DP08; Ford 5.0L V8	DP	1
Penske Racing	12	(Germany) Timo Bernhard	Riley Mk. XX; Porsche 3.99L Flat-6	DP	2–12
Penske Racing	12	(France) Romain Dumas	Riley Mk. XX; Porsche 3.99L Flat-6	DP	2–12
Penske Racing	16	(Australia) Ryan Briscoe	Riley Mk. XX; Porsche 3.99L Flat-6	DP	1
Penske Racing	16	(Germany) Timo Bernhard	Riley Mk. XX; Porsche 3.99L Flat-6	DP	1
Penske Racing	16	(France) Romain Dumas	Riley Mk. XX; Porsche 3.99L Flat-6	DP	1
Autometric Motorsports	14	(United States) Jack Baldwin	Porsche 997 GT3 Cup; Porsche 3.6L Flat-6	GT	1
Autometric Motorsports	14	(Argentina) Claudio Burtin	Porsche 997 GT3 Cup; Porsche 3.6L Flat-6	GT	1
Autometric Motorsports	14	(United States) Cory Friedman	Porsche 997 GT3 Cup; Porsche 3.6L Flat-6	GT	1
Autometric Motorsports	14	(Austria) Martin Ragginger	Porsche 997 GT3 Cup; Porsche 3.6L Flat-6	GT	1
Autometric Motorsports	14	(United States) Mac McGehee	Porsche 997 GT3 Cup; Porsche 3.6L Flat-6	GT	1
Blackforest Motorsports	15	(Australia) Paul Morris	Ford Mustang; Ford 5.0L V8	GT	1
Blackforest Motorsports	15	(Australia) Owen Kelly	Ford Mustang; Ford 5.0L V8	GT	1
Blackforest Motorsports	15	(United States) Boris Said	Ford Mustang; Ford 5.0L V8	GT	1
Blackforest Motorsports	15	(United States) Tom Nastasi	Ford Mustang; Ford 5.0L V8	GT	1
Battery Tender/MCM Racing	21	(Mexico) Pepe Montaño	Pontiac GTO.R; Pontiac 6.0L V8	GT	1
Battery Tender/MCM Racing	21	(United States) Jason Daskalos	Pontiac GTO.R; Pontiac 6.0L V8	GT	1
Battery Tender/MCM Racing	21	(Italy) Diego Alessi	Pontiac GTO.R; Pontiac 6.0L V8	GT	1, 9–10
Battery Tender/MCM Racing	21	(United States) Jason Vinkemulder	Pontiac GTO.R; Pontiac 6.0L V8	GT	1, 5
Battery Tender/MCM Racing	21	(United States) Shane Lewis	Pontiac GTO.R; Pontiac 6.0L V8	GT	5–8
Battery Tender/MCM Racing	21	(United States) Matt Connolly	Pontiac GTO.R; Pontiac 6.0L V8	GT	5, 8
Battery Tender/MCM Racing	21	(United States) Ryan Phinny	Pontiac GTO.R; Pontiac 6.0L V8	GT	2–3
Battery Tender/MCM Racing	21	(United States) Shawn Price	Pontiac GTO.R; Pontiac 6.0L V8	GT	6
Battery Tender/MCM Racing	21	(United States) Peter London	Pontiac GTO.R; Pontiac 6.0L V8	GT	7
Battery Tender/MCM Racing	21	(United States) Mike Halpin	Pontiac GTO.R; Pontiac 6.0L V8	GT	8
Battery Tender/MCM Racing	21	(United States) John Weisberg	Pontiac GTO.R; Pontiac 6.0L V8	GT	9
Battery Tender/MCM Racing	21	(Australia) Karl Reindler	Pontiac GTO.R; Pontiac 6.0L V8	GT	10
Battery Tender/MCM Racing	21	(United States) Jim Briody	Pontiac GTO.R; Pontiac 6.0L V8	GT	11
Battery Tender/MCM Racing	21	(United States) Hal Prewitt	Pontiac GTO.R; Pontiac 6.0L V8	GT	11
Battery Tender/MCM Racing	21	(United States) Mike Sweeney	Pontiac GTO.R; Pontiac 6.0L V8	GT	12
Battery Tender/MCM Racing	21	(Puerto Rico) Bryan Ortiz	Pontiac GTO.R; Pontiac 6.0L V8	GT	12
Battery Tender/MCM Racing	21	(United States) Romeo Kapudija	Pontiac GTO.R; Pontiac 6.0L V8	GT	2–3
Battery Tender/MCM Racing	31	(United States) Romeo Kapudija	Porsche 997 GT3 Cup; Porsche 3.6L Flat-6	GT	1, 4
Battery Tender/MCM Racing	31	(United States) John Lewis	Porsche 997 GT3 Cup; Porsche 3.6L Flat-6	GT	1
Battery Tender/MCM Racing	31	(United States) John McMullen Jr.	Porsche 997 GT3 Cup; Porsche 3.6L Flat-6	GT	1
Battery Tender/MCM Racing	31	(United States) Bob Michaelian	Porsche 997 GT3 Cup; Porsche 3.6L Flat-6	GT	1
Battery Tender/MCM Racing	31	(United States) Jim Michaelian	Porsche 997 GT3 Cup; Porsche 3.6L Flat-6	GT	1
Battery Tender/MCM Racing	31	(South Africa) Hennie Groenewald	Porsche 997 GT3 Cup; Porsche 3.6L Flat-6	GT	2–3
Battery Tender/MCM Racing	31	(South Africa) Dion von Moltke	Porsche 997 GT3 Cup; Porsche 3.6L Flat-6	GT	2, 4
Alegra Motorsports	22	(United States) Carlos de Quesada	Riley Mk. XI; BMW 5.0L V8	DP	1, 5
Alegra Motorsports	22	(United Kingdom) Ryan Dalziel	Riley Mk. XI; BMW 5.0L V8	DP	1, 5
Alegra Motorsports	22	(Canada) Jean-Francois Dumoulin	Riley Mk. XI; BMW 5.0L V8	DP	1
Alegra Motorsports	22	(United States) Chapman Ducote	Riley Mk. XI; BMW 5.0L V8	DP	1
Alegra Motorsports	22	(Czech Republic) Tomáš Enge	Riley Mk. XI; BMW 5.0L V8	DP	1, 12
Alegra Motorsports	22	(United Kingdom) Ian James	Riley Mk. XI; BMW 5.0L V8	DP	5
Alegra Motorsports	22	(United States) Terry Borcheller	Riley Mk. XI; BMW 5.0L V8	DP	12
Gotham Competition	26	(Puerto Rico) Gerardo Bonilla	Porsche 997 GT3 Cup; Porsche 3.6L Flat-6	GT	1
Gotham Competition	26	(United States) Randy Pobst	Porsche 997 GT3 Cup; Porsche 3.6L Flat-6	GT	1
Gotham Competition	26	(United States) Shane Lewis	Porsche 997 GT3 Cup; Porsche 3.6L Flat-6	GT	1
Gotham Competition	26	(United States) Jerome Jacalone	Porsche 997 GT3 Cup; Porsche 3.6L Flat-6	GT	1
Gotham Competition	26	(United States) Joe Jacalone	Porsche 997 GT3 Cup; Porsche 3.6L Flat-6	GT	1
Racers Edge Motorsports	30	(United States) Dane Cameron	Mazda RX-8 GT; Mazda 2.0L 3-Rotor	GT	All
Racers Edge Motorsports	30	(United States) Bryce Miller	Mazda RX-8 GT; Mazda 2.0L 3-Rotor	GT	2–5
Racers Edge Motorsports	30	(United States) Bryan Sellers	Mazda RX-8 GT; Mazda 2.0L 3-Rotor	GT	1
Racers Edge Motorsports	30	(South Africa) Dion von Moltke	Mazda RX-8 GT; Mazda 2.0L 3-Rotor	GT	1
Racers Edge Motorsports	30	(United States) Douglas Peterson	Mazda RX-8 GT; Mazda 2.0L 3-Rotor	GT	1, 10
Racers Edge Motorsports	30	(United States) Peter Ludwig	Mazda RX-8 GT; Mazda 2.0L 3-Rotor	GT	5
Racers Edge Motorsports	30	(United States) Tom Sutherland	Mazda RX-8 GT; Mazda 2.0L 3-Rotor	GT	6–7, 9–10
Racers Edge Motorsports	30	(United States) Wayne Nonnamaker	Mazda RX-8 GT; Mazda 2.0L 3-Rotor	GT	8
Racers Edge Motorsports	30	(United States) Jade Buford	Mazda RX-8 GT; Mazda 2.0L 3-Rotor	GT	11
Racers Edge Motorsports	30	(United States) Jordan Taylor	Mazda RX-8 GT; Mazda 2.0L 3-Rotor	GT	11
Racers Edge Motorsports	30	(Canada) Daniel DiLeo	Mazda RX-8 GT; Mazda 2.0L 3-Rotor	GT	12
PR1 Motorsports	32	(Canada) Mike Forest	Pontiac GXP.R; Pontiac 6.0L V8	GT	1–3
PR1 Motorsports	32	(United States) Lawson Aschenbach	Pontiac GXP.R; Pontiac 6.0L V8	GT	2–4
PR1 Motorsports	32	(United States) Thomas Merrill	Pontiac GXP.R; Pontiac 6.0L V8	GT	1, 4
PR1 Motorsports	32	(United States) Patrick Barrett	Pontiac GXP.R; Pontiac 6.0L V8	GT	1
PR1 Motorsports	32	(United States) Al Salvo	Pontiac GXP.R; Pontiac 6.0L V8	GT	1
PR1 Motorsports	32	(United States) Jeff Westphal	Pontiac GXP.R; Pontiac 6.0L V8	GT	1
PR1 Motorsports	32	(United States) Jeff Westphal	BMW M6; Pontiac 6.0L V8	GT	9–12
PR1 Motorsports	32	(United States) Max Hyatt	BMW M6; Pontiac 6.0L V8	GT	9–12
PR1 Motorsports	32	(United States) Cristiano Piquet	BMW M6; Pontiac 6.0L V8	GT	12
Wright Motorsports	33	(France) Patrick Pilet	Porsche 997 GT3 Cup; Porsche 3.6L Flat-6	GT	1
Wright Motorsports	33	(Germany) Sascha Maassen	Porsche 997 GT3 Cup; Porsche 3.6L Flat-6	GT	1
Wright Motorsports	33	(United States) B. J. Zacharias	Porsche 997 GT3 Cup; Porsche 3.6L Flat-6	GT	1
Wright Motorsports	33	(United States) Phillip Martien	Porsche 997 GT3 Cup; Porsche 3.6L Flat-6	GT	1
Orbit Racing	34	(United States) Lance Willsey	Porsche 997 GT3 Cup; Porsche 3.6L Flat-6	GT	1, 7
Orbit Racing	34	(United States) Lawson Aschenbach	Porsche 997 GT3 Cup; Porsche 3.6L Flat-6	GT	1
Orbit Racing	34	(Costa Rica) Milo Valverde	Porsche 997 GT3 Cup; Porsche 3.6L Flat-6	GT	1
Orbit Racing	34	(Puerto Rico) Hiram Cruz	Porsche 997 GT3 Cup; Porsche 3.6L Flat-6	GT	1
Orbit Racing	34	(United States) Omar Rodriguez	Porsche 997 GT3 Cup; Porsche 3.6L Flat-6	GT	1
Orbit Racing	34	(United States) John McMullen Jr.	Porsche 997 GT3 Cup; Porsche 3.6L Flat-6	GT	7
Orbit Racing	45	(United States) Bill Lester	Riley Mk. XI; BMW 5.0L V8	DP	1–2, 4–5, 7, 9
Orbit Racing	45	(United Kingdom) Darren Manning	Riley Mk. XI; BMW 5.0L V8	DP	1–2, 4–5
Orbit Racing	45	(United States) Kyle Petty	Riley Mk. XI; BMW 5.0L V8	DP	1
Orbit Racing	45	(United States) Leo Hindery	Riley Mk. XI; BMW 5.0L V8	DP	1
Orbit Racing	45	(United States) Bill Auberlen	Riley Mk. XI; BMW 5.0L V8	DP	5
Orbit Racing	45	(United Kingdom) Ryan Dalziel	Riley Mk. XI; BMW 5.0L V8	DP	7, 9, 12
Orbit Racing	45	(South Africa) Dion von Moltke	Riley Mk. XI; BMW 5.0L V8	DP	12
Dempsey Racing	40	(United States) Joe Foster	Mazda RX-8 GT; Mazda 2.0L 3-Rotor	GT	All
Dempsey Racing	40	(United States) Charles Espenlaub	Mazda RX-8 GT; Mazda 2.0L 3-Rotor	GT	1–2, 5, 8–9, 11
Dempsey Racing	40	(United States) Patrick Dempsey	Mazda RX-8 GT; Mazda 2.0L 3-Rotor	GT	1, 3–7, 10, 12
Dempsey Racing	40	(United States) Jep Thornton	Mazda RX-8 GT; Mazda 2.0L 3-Rotor	GT	1
Dempsey Racing	40	(United States) Tim Lewis Jr.	Mazda RX-8 GT; Mazda 2.0L 3-Rotor	GT	1
Team Sahlen	42	(United States) Will Nonnamaker	Chevrolet Corvette C6; Chevrolet 5.7L V8	GT	1–6, 8–9
Team Sahlen	42	(United States) Joe Sahlen	Chevrolet Corvette C6; Chevrolet 5.7L V8	GT	1–6, 8–9
Team Sahlen	42	(United States) Wayne Nonnamaker	Chevrolet Corvette C6; Chevrolet 5.7L V8	GT	1
Team Sahlen	42	(United States) Joe Nonnamaker	Chevrolet Corvette C6; Chevrolet 5.7L V8	GT	1
Team Sahlen	43	(United States) Wayne Nonnamaker	Chevrolet Corvette C6; Chevrolet 5.7L V8	GT	2–6, 8
Team Sahlen	43	(United States) Joe Nonnamaker	Chevrolet Corvette C6; Chevrolet 5.7L V8	GT	2–6, 8
Bullet Racing	44	(Canada) Ross Bentley	Porsche 997 GT3 Cup; Porsche 3.6L Flat-6	GT	1
Bullet Racing	44	(Canada) Keith Carter	Porsche 997 GT3 Cup; Porsche 3.6L Flat-6	GT	1
Bullet Racing	44	(United States) Daniel Herrington	Porsche 997 GT3 Cup; Porsche 3.6L Flat-6	GT	1
Bullet Racing	44	(Canada) Glenn Nixon	Porsche 997 GT3 Cup; Porsche 3.6L Flat-6	GT	1
Bullet Racing	44	(Canada) Steve Paquette	Porsche 997 GT3 Cup; Porsche 3.6L Flat-6	GT	1
Miller Barrett Racing	48	(United States) Bryce Miller	Porsche 997 GT3 Cup; Porsche 3.6L Flat-6	GT	9–12
Miller Barrett Racing	48	(United States) Kevin Roush	Porsche 997 GT3 Cup; Porsche 3.6L Flat-6	GT	9, 11–12
Miller Barrett Racing	48	(Canada) Dave Lacey	Porsche 997 GT3 Cup; Porsche 3.6L Flat-6	GT	10
AIM Autosport	51	(Canada) John Farano	Riley Mk. XI; Ford 5.0L V8	DP	10
AIM Autosport	51	(Canada) Jean-Francois Dumoulin	Riley Mk. XI; Ford 5.0L V8	DP	10
AIM Autosport	61	(Canada) John Farano	Riley Mk. XX; Ford 5.0L V8	DP	1
AIM Autosport	61	(Canada) Mark Wilkins	Riley Mk. XX; Ford 5.0L V8	DP	All
AIM Autosport	61	(United States) Burt Frisselle	Riley Mk. XX; Ford 5.0L V8	DP	All
AIM Autosport	61	(Canada) David Empringham	Riley Mk. XX; Ford 5.0L V8	DP	1
AIM Autosport	61	(United States) Alex Figge	Riley Mk. XX; Ford 5.0L V8	DP	1
AIM Autosport	61	(Brazil) Bruno Junqueira	Riley Mk. XX; Ford 5.0L V8	DP	5
Mastercar-Coast 2 Costa Racing	52	(United States) Cort Wagner	Ferrari F430 Challenge; Ferrari 4.3L V8	GT	1
Mastercar-Coast 2 Costa Racing	52	(Italy) Luca Pirri	Ferrari F430 Challenge; Ferrari 4.3L V8	GT	1
Mastercar-Coast 2 Costa Racing	52	(Spain) Joe Castellano	Ferrari F430 Challenge; Ferrari 4.3L V8	GT	1
Mastercar-Coast 2 Costa Racing	52	(United States) Costantino Bertuzzi	Ferrari F430 Challenge; Ferrari 4.3L V8	GT	1
Mastercar-Coast 2 Costa Racing	52	(San Marino) Christian Montanari	Ferrari F430 Challenge; Ferrari 4.3L V8	GT	1
Mastercar-Coast 2 Costa Racing	56	(Italy) Max Papis	Ferrari F430 Challenge; Ferrari 4.3L V8	GT	1
Mastercar-Coast 2 Costa Racing	56	(United States) Nathan Swartzbaugh	Ferrari F430 Challenge; Ferrari 4.3L V8	GT	1
Mastercar-Coast 2 Costa Racing	56	(Italy) Luca Drudi	Ferrari F430 Challenge; Ferrari 4.3L V8	GT	1
Mastercar-Coast 2 Costa Racing	56	(Portugal) César Campaniço	Ferrari F430 Challenge; Ferrari 4.3L V8	GT	1
LevelFive Motorsports	55	(United States) Scott Tucker	Riley Mk. XX; BMW 5.0L V8	DP	1–2, 4–6, 9, 12
LevelFive Motorsports	55	(France) Christophe Bouchut	Riley Mk. XX; BMW 5.0L V8	DP	1–2, 4–6, 9, 12
LevelFive Motorsports	55	(Brazil) Raphael Matos	Riley Mk. XX; BMW 5.0L V8	DP	1
LevelFive Motorsports	55	(United States) Ed Zabinski	Riley Mk. XX; BMW 5.0L V8	DP	1
Stevenson Motorsports	57	(United Kingdom) Robin Liddell	Pontiac GXP.R; Pontiac 6.0L V8	GT	All
Stevenson Motorsports	57	(United States) Andrew Davis	Pontiac GXP.R; Pontiac 6.0L V8	GT	All
Stevenson Motorsports	57	(United States) Jeff Bucknum	Pontiac GXP.R; Pontiac 6.0L V8	GT	1
Stevenson Motorsports	97	(United States) Ryan Eversley	Chevrolet Corvette C6; Chevrolet 5.7L V8	GT	1
Stevenson Motorsports	97	(United States) Tom Long	Chevrolet Corvette C6; Chevrolet 5.7L V8	GT	1
Stevenson Motorsports	97	(United States) Galen Bieker	Chevrolet Corvette C6; Chevrolet 5.7L V8	GT	1
Stevenson Motorsports	97	(United States) James Gue	Chevrolet Corvette C6; Chevrolet 5.7L V8	GT	1
Brumos Racing	58	(United States) Darren Law	Riley Mk. XI; Porsche 3.99L Flat-6	DP	All
Brumos Racing	58	(United States) David Donohue	Riley Mk. XI; Porsche 3.99L Flat-6	DP	All
Brumos Racing	58	(United States) Buddy Rice	Riley Mk. XI; Porsche 3.99L Flat-6	DP	1
Brumos Racing	58	(Spain) Antonio García	Riley Mk. XI; Porsche 3.99L Flat-6	DP	1
Brumos Racing	59	(Portugal) João Barbosa	Riley Mk. XI; Porsche 3.99L Flat-6	DP	All
Brumos Racing	59	(United States) J. C. France	Riley Mk. XI; Porsche 3.99L Flat-6	DP	1–11
Brumos Racing	59	(United States) Hurley Haywood	Riley Mk. XI; Porsche 3.99L Flat-6	DP	1, 5, 12
Brumos Racing	59	(United States) Terry Borcheller	Riley Mk. XI; Porsche 3.99L Flat-6	DP	1
The Racer's Group	63	(United States) Kurt Kossmann	Porsche 997 GT3 Cup; Porsche 3.6L Flat-6	GT	1
The Racer's Group	63	(United States) Bruce Ledoux III	Porsche 997 GT3 Cup; Porsche 3.6L Flat-6	GT	1
The Racer's Group	63	(United States) David Quinlan	Porsche 997 GT3 Cup; Porsche 3.6L Flat-6	GT	1
The Racer's Group	63	(United States) Dan Watkins	Porsche 997 GT3 Cup; Porsche 3.6L Flat-6	GT	1
The Racer's Group	63	(United States) Steve Zadig	Porsche 997 GT3 Cup; Porsche 3.6L Flat-6	GT	1
The Racer's Group	63	(United States) Henri Richard	Porsche 997 GT3 Cup; Porsche 3.6L Flat-6	GT	4, 12
The Racer's Group	63	(United States) René Villeneuve	Porsche 997 GT3 Cup; Porsche 3.6L Flat-6	GT	4, 12
The Racer's Group	66	(United States) Ted Ballou	Porsche 997 GT3 Cup; Porsche 3.6L Flat-6	GT	1–4
The Racer's Group	66	(United States) Spencer Pumpelly	Porsche 997 GT3 Cup; Porsche 3.6L Flat-6	GT	1–8, 12
The Racer's Group	66	(France) Emmanuel Collard	Porsche 997 GT3 Cup; Porsche 3.6L Flat-6	GT	1
The Racer's Group	66	(Austria) Richard Lietz	Porsche 997 GT3 Cup; Porsche 3.6L Flat-6	GT	1
The Racer's Group	66	(United States) Tim George Jr.	Porsche 997 GT3 Cup; Porsche 3.6L Flat-6	GT	1
The Racer's Group	66	(United States) Craig Stanton	Porsche 997 GT3 Cup; Porsche 3.6L Flat-6	GT	5
The Racer's Group	66	(United States) John Potter	Porsche 997 GT3 Cup; Porsche 3.6L Flat-6	GT	5, 8
The Racer's Group	66	(United States) Duncan Ende	Porsche 997 GT3 Cup; Porsche 3.6L Flat-6	GT	6
The Racer's Group	66	(United States) Kevin Buckler	Porsche 997 GT3 Cup; Porsche 3.6L Flat-6	GT	7
The Racer's Group	66	(United States) Justin Marks	Porsche 997 GT3 Cup; Porsche 3.6L Flat-6	GT	9
The Racer's Group	66	(United States) Brendan Gaughan	Porsche 997 GT3 Cup; Porsche 3.6L Flat-6	GT	10
The Racer's Group	66	(United States) Scott Schroeder	Porsche 997 GT3 Cup; Porsche 3.6L Flat-6	GT	11
The Racer's Group	66	(United States) Andy Lally	Porsche 997 GT3 Cup; Porsche 3.6L Flat-6	GT	9–12
The Racer's Group	67	(United States) Andy Lally	Porsche 997 GT3 Cup; Porsche 3.6L Flat-6	GT	1–8
The Racer's Group	67	(United States) Justin Marks	Porsche 997 GT3 Cup; Porsche 3.6L Flat-6	GT	1–8
The Racer's Group	67	(Germany) Jörg Bergmeister	Porsche 997 GT3 Cup; Porsche 3.6L Flat-6	GT	1
The Racer's Group	67	(United States) Patrick Long	Porsche 997 GT3 Cup; Porsche 3.6L Flat-6	GT	1
The Racer's Group	67	(United States) R. J. Valentine	Porsche 997 GT3 Cup; Porsche 3.6L Flat-6	GT	1, 5
The Racer's Group	68	(United States) R. J. Valentine	Porsche 997 GT3 Cup; Porsche 3.6L Flat-6	GT	3
The Racer's Group	68	(Mexico) Josémanuel Gutierrez	Porsche 997 GT3 Cup; Porsche 3.6L Flat-6	GT	1–2, 4–9
The Racer's Group	68	(United States) Scott Schroeder	Porsche 997 GT3 Cup; Porsche 3.6L Flat-6	GT	1–2, 4–9
The Racer's Group	68	(United States) Chris Pallis	Porsche 997 GT3 Cup; Porsche 3.6L Flat-6	GT	1
The Racer's Group	68	(United States) Steve Miller	Porsche 997 GT3 Cup; Porsche 3.6L Flat-6	GT	1
The Racer's Group	68	(United States) Duncan Ende	Porsche 997 GT3 Cup; Porsche 3.6L Flat-6	GT	1, 5
The Racer's Group	68	(United States) Tim George Jr.	Porsche 997 GT3 Cup; Porsche 3.6L Flat-6	GT	3
JLowe Racing	64	(United States) Jim Lowe	Porsche 997 GT3 Cup; Porsche 3.6L Flat-6	GT	1, 7
JLowe Racing	64	(United States) Jim Pace	Porsche 997 GT3 Cup; Porsche 3.6L Flat-6	GT	1, 7
JLowe Racing	64	(United States) Johannes van Overbeek	Porsche 997 GT3 Cup; Porsche 3.6L Flat-6	GT	1, 7
JLowe Racing	64	(United Kingdom) Tim Sugden	Porsche 997 GT3 Cup; Porsche 3.6L Flat-6	GT	1
Riegel/Stanton/The Racer's Group	65	(United States) Craig Stanton	Porsche 997 GT3 Cup; Porsche 3.6L Flat-6	GT	1–4, 6–12
Riegel/Stanton/The Racer's Group	65	(United States) John Potter	Porsche 997 GT3 Cup; Porsche 3.6L Flat-6	GT	1–4, 6–12
Riegel/Stanton/The Racer's Group	65	(United States) Bryce Miller	Porsche 997 GT3 Cup; Porsche 3.6L Flat-6	GT	1
Riegel/Stanton/The Racer's Group	65	(Germany) Marco Holzer	Porsche 997 GT3 Cup; Porsche 3.6L Flat-6	GT	1
SpeedSource	69	(United States) Emil Assentato	Mazda RX-8 GT; Mazda 2.0L 3-Rotor	GT	All
SpeedSource	69	(United States) Jeff Segal	Mazda RX-8 GT; Mazda 2.0L 3-Rotor	GT	All
SpeedSource	69	(United States) Nick Longhi	Mazda RX-8 GT; Mazda 2.0L 3-Rotor	GT	1, 5
SpeedSource	69	(United States) Matt Plumb	Mazda RX-8 GT; Mazda 2.0L 3-Rotor	GT	1
SpeedSource	70	(Canada) Sylvain Tremblay	Mazda RX-8 GT; Mazda 2.0L 3-Rotor	GT	All
SpeedSource	70	(United Kingdom) Nick Ham	Mazda RX-8 GT; Mazda 2.0L 3-Rotor	GT	All
SpeedSource	70	(United States) Jonathan Bomarito	Mazda RX-8 GT; Mazda 2.0L 3-Rotor	GT	1
SpeedSource	70	(United States) David Haskell	Mazda RX-8 GT; Mazda 2.0L 3-Rotor	GT	1, 5
Synergy Racing	71	(United States) Carey Grant	Porsche 997 GT3 Cup; Porsche 3.6L Flat-6	GT	2, 5–6, 12
Synergy Racing	71	(United States) Kevin Grant	Porsche 997 GT3 Cup; Porsche 3.6L Flat-6	GT	2, 5–6, 12
Synergy Racing	71	(United States) Milton Grant	Porsche 997 GT3 Cup; Porsche 3.6L Flat-6	GT	2, 5–6, 12
Krohn Racing	75	(United States) Tracy Krohn	Proto-Auto Lola B08/70; Ford 5.0L V8	DP	1, 7
Krohn Racing	75	(Belgium) Eric van de Poele	Proto-Auto Lola B08/70; Ford 5.0L V8	DP	1, 7
Krohn Racing	75	(United Kingdom) Oliver Gavin	Proto-Auto Lola B08/70; Ford 5.0L V8	DP	1
Krohn Racing	76	(Brazil) Ricardo Zonta	Proto-Auto Lola B08/70; Ford 5.0L V8	DP	1–6, 8–9
Krohn Racing	76	(Sweden) Niclas Jönsson	Proto-Auto Lola B08/70; Ford 5.0L V8	DP	1–9
Krohn Racing	76	(United Kingdom) Darren Turner	Proto-Auto Lola B08/70; Ford 5.0L V8	DP	1, 7
Doran Racing	77	(United States) Memo Gidley	Dallara DP01; Ford 5.0L V8	DP	1–6, 8–9
Doran Racing	77	(United States) Brad Jaeger	Dallara DP01; Ford 5.0L V8	DP	1–6, 8–9
Doran Racing	77	(Italy) Fabrizio Gollin	Dallara DP01; Ford 5.0L V8	DP	1
Doran Racing	77	(Italy) Matteo Bobbi	Dallara DP01; Ford 5.0L V8	DP	1
Doran Racing	77	(South Africa) Hennie Groenewald	Dallara DP01; Ford 5.0L V8	DP	7
Doran Racing	77	(South Africa) Dion von Moltke	Dallara DP01; Ford 5.0L V8	DP	7
Doran Racing	77	(Australia) Marcos Ambrose	Dallara DP01; Ford 5.0L V8	DP	10
Doran Racing	77	(United States) Carl Edwards	Dallara DP01; Ford 5.0L V8	DP	10
Farnbacher-Loles Racing	84	(United States) Jim Pace	Porsche 997 GT3 Cup; Porsche 3.6L Flat-6	GT	9
Farnbacher-Loles Racing	84	(United States) John Tancredi	Porsche 997 GT3 Cup; Porsche 3.6L Flat-6	GT	9
Farnbacher-Loles Racing	85	(Dominican Republic) Richard Campollo	Porsche 997 GT3 Cup; Porsche 3.6L Flat-6	GT	1
Farnbacher-Loles Racing	85	(United States) Michael Gomez	Porsche 997 GT3 Cup; Porsche 3.6L Flat-6	GT	1
Farnbacher-Loles Racing	85	(United States) Daniel Graeff	Porsche 997 GT3 Cup; Porsche 3.6L Flat-6	GT	1, 7
Farnbacher-Loles Racing	85	(United States) Ron Yarab Jr.	Porsche 997 GT3 Cup; Porsche 3.6L Flat-6	GT	1, 7
Farnbacher-Loles Racing	85	(Germany) Wolf Henzler	Porsche 997 GT3 Cup; Porsche 3.6L Flat-6	GT	1
Farnbacher-Loles Racing	86	(Germany) Wolf Henzler	Porsche 997 GT3 Cup; Porsche 3.6L Flat-6	GT	2, 5, 7–8, 11
Farnbacher-Loles Racing	86	(United States) Eric Lux	Porsche 997 GT3 Cup; Porsche 3.6L Flat-6	GT	All
Farnbacher-Loles Racing	86	(United States) Bryan Sellers	Porsche 997 GT3 Cup; Porsche 3.6L Flat-6	GT	3, 10
Farnbacher-Loles Racing	86	(United States) Kevin Roush	Porsche 997 GT3 Cup; Porsche 3.6L Flat-6	GT	1, 4
Farnbacher-Loles Racing	86	(Hong Kong) Matthew Marsh	Porsche 997 GT3 Cup; Porsche 3.6L Flat-6	GT	1
Farnbacher-Loles Racing	86	(Germany) Dominik Farnbacher	Porsche 997 GT3 Cup; Porsche 3.6L Flat-6	GT	1, 6
Farnbacher-Loles Racing	86	(Germany) Marco Holzer	Porsche 997 GT3 Cup; Porsche 3.6L Flat-6	GT	9
Farnbacher-Loles Racing	86	(Canada) Dave Lacey	Porsche 997 GT3 Cup; Porsche 3.6L Flat-6	GT	12
Farnbacher-Loles Racing	87	(United States) Leh Keen	Porsche 997 GT3 Cup; Porsche 3.6L Flat-6	GT	All
Farnbacher-Loles Racing	87	(Germany) Dirk Werner	Porsche 997 GT3 Cup; Porsche 3.6L Flat-6	GT	All
Farnbacher-Loles Racing	87	(Germany) Dominik Farnbacher	Porsche 997 GT3 Cup; Porsche 3.6L Flat-6	GT	1
Farnbacher-Loles Racing	87	(Germany) Wolf Henzler	Porsche 997 GT3 Cup; Porsche 3.6L Flat-6	GT	1
Farnbacher-Loles Racing	87	(United Kingdom) Richard Westbrook	Porsche 997 GT3 Cup; Porsche 3.6L Flat-6	GT	1
Farnbacher-Loles Racing	88	(United States) James Sofronas	Porsche 997 GT3 Cup; Porsche 3.6L Flat-6	GT	1
Farnbacher-Loles Racing	88	(United Kingdom) Robert Nearn	Porsche 997 GT3 Cup; Porsche 3.6L Flat-6	GT	1
Farnbacher-Loles Racing	88	(United Kingdom) Richard Westbrook	Porsche 997 GT3 Cup; Porsche 3.6L Flat-6	GT	1
Farnbacher-Loles Racing	88	(United States) Steve Johnson	Porsche 997 GT3 Cup; Porsche 3.6L Flat-6	GT	1, 5
Farnbacher-Loles Racing	88	(Canada) Dave Lacey	Porsche 997 GT3 Cup; Porsche 3.6L Flat-6	GT	1, 5
Farnbacher-Loles Racing	88	(United States) Jack Baldwin	Porsche 997 GT3 Cup; Porsche 3.6L Flat-6	GT	5
Farnbacher-Loles Racing	89	(Germany) Pierre Kaffer	Porsche 997 GT3 Cup; Porsche 3.6L Flat-6	GT	1
Farnbacher-Loles Racing	89	(Italy) Giacomo Petrobelli	Porsche 997 GT3 Cup; Porsche 3.6L Flat-6	GT	1
Farnbacher-Loles Racing	89	(Italy) Gabrio Rosa	Porsche 997 GT3 Cup; Porsche 3.6L Flat-6	GT	1
Farnbacher-Loles Racing	89	(Italy) Giorgio Rosa	Porsche 997 GT3 Cup; Porsche 3.6L Flat-6	GT	1
Farnbacher-Loles Racing	89	(Denmark) Allan Simonsen	Porsche 997 GT3 Cup; Porsche 3.6L Flat-6	GT	1
RVO Motorsports	91	(United States) Paul Dallenbach	Riley Mk. XI; Pontiac 5.0L V8	DP	5
RVO Motorsports	91	(United States) Roger Schramm	Riley Mk. XI; Pontiac 5.0L V8	DP	5
GAINSCO/Bob Stallings Racing	99	(United States) Alex Gurney	Riley Mk. XX; Pontiac 5.0L V8	DP	All
GAINSCO/Bob Stallings Racing	99	(United States) Jon Fogarty	Riley Mk. XX; Pontiac 5.0L V8	DP	All
GAINSCO/Bob Stallings Racing	99	(United States) Jimmy Vasser	Riley Mk. XX; Pontiac 5.0L V8	DP	1
GAINSCO/Bob Stallings Racing	99	(United States) Jimmie Johnson	Riley Mk. XX; Pontiac 5.0L V8	DP	1

Icon	Class
DP	Daytona Prototype
GT	Grand Touring

== Schedule ==
Rnd	Race	Length	Circuit	Date
1	Rolex 24 At Daytona	24 Hours	Daytona International Speedway	January 24–25
2	Bosch Engineering 250 at VIR	250 Miles	Virginia International Raceway	April 25
3	Verizon Wireless 250	250 Miles	New Jersey Motorsports Park	May 3
4	Verizon Festival of Speed	250 Miles	Mazda Raceway Laguna Seca	May 17
5	Sahlen's Six Hours of the Glen	6 Hours	Watkins Glen International Long	June 6
6	EMCO Gears Classic	250 Miles	Mid-Ohio Sports Car Course	June 20
7	Brumos Porsche 250	250 Miles	Daytona International Speedway	July 4
8	Porsche 250 Presented by Bradley Arant	250 Miles	Barber Motorsports Park	July 19
9	Crown Royal 200 at the Glen	200 Miles	Watkins Glen International Short	August 7
10	Montreal 200	200 Miles	Circuit Gilles Villeneuve	August 29
11	SunRichGourmet.com 250	250 Miles	Miller Motorsports Park	September 19
12	Gainsco Grand Prix of Miami	250 Miles	Homestead-Miami Speedway	October 10

== Season results ==
Rnd	Circuit	Pole position	Fastest lap	Winner	Results
1	Daytona	#58 Brumos Racing	#16 Penske Racing	#58 Brumos Racing	Results
1	Daytona	(United States) David Donohue (Spain) Antonio García (United States) Darren Law (United States) Buddy Rice	(France) Romain Dumas (Germany) Timo Bernhard (Australia) Ryan Briscoe	(United States) David Donohue (Spain) Antonio García (United States) Darren Law (United States) Buddy Rice	Results
1	Daytona	#70 SpeedSource	#86 Farnbacher Loles Racing	#67 The Racer's Group	Results
1	Daytona	(Canada) Sylvain Tremblay (United Kingdom) Nick Ham (United States) Jonathan Bomarito (United States) David Haskell	(Germany) Dominik Farnbacher (United States) Eric Lux (Hong Kong) Matthew Marsh (United States) Kevin Roush	(Germany) Jörg Bergmeister (United States) Andy Lally (United States) Patrick Long (United States) Justin Marks (United States) R. J. Valentine	Results
2	Virginia	#01 Chip Ganassi Racing	#10 SunTrust Racing	#99 GAINSCO/Bob Stallings Racing	Results
2	Virginia	(Mexico) Memo Rojas (United States) Scott Pruett	(Italy) Max Angelelli (United States) Brian Frisselle	(United States) Jon Fogarty (United States) Alex Gurney	Results
2	Virginia	#70 SpeedSource	#57 Stevenson Motorsports	#57 Stevenson Motorsports	Results
2	Virginia	(United Kingdom) Nick Ham (Canada) Sylvain Tremblay	(United Kingdom) Robin Liddell (United States) Andrew Davis	(United States) Andrew Davis (United Kingdom) Robin Liddell	Results
3	New Jersey	#12 Penske Racing	#6 Michael Shank Racing	#76 Krohn Racing	Results
3	New Jersey	(France) Romain Dumas (Germany) Timo Bernhard	(Canada) Michael Valiante (United States) John Pew	(Sweden) Niclas Jönsson (Brazil) Ricardo Zonta	Results
3	New Jersey	#07 Banner Racing	#87 Farnbacher Loles Racing	#87 Farnbacher Loles Racing	Results
3	New Jersey	(United States) Kelly Collins (United States) Paul Edwards	(Germany) Dirk Werner (United States) Leh Keen	(United States) Leh Keen (Germany) Dirk Werner	Results
4	Laguna Seca	#01 Chip Ganassi Racing	#99 GAINSCO/Bob Stallings Racing	#99 GAINSCO/Bob Stallings Racing	Results
4	Laguna Seca	(Mexico) Memo Rojas (United States) Scott Pruett	(United States) Jon Fogarty (United States) Alex Gurney	(United States) Jon Fogarty (United States) Alex Gurney	Results
4	Laguna Seca	#70 SpeedSource	#70 SpeedSource	#70 SpeedSource	Results
4	Laguna Seca	(United Kingdom) Nick Ham (Canada) Sylvain Tremblay	(Canada) Sylvain Tremblay (United Kingdom) Nick Ham	(United Kingdom) Nick Ham (Canada) Sylvain Tremblay	Results
5	Watkins Glen	#01 Chip Ganassi Racing	#01 Chip Ganassi Racing	#01 Chip Ganassi Racing	Results
5	Watkins Glen	(United States) Scott Pruett (Mexico) Memo Rojas	(United States) Scott Pruett (Mexico) Memo Rojas	(United States) Scott Pruett (Mexico) Memo Rojas	Results
5	Watkins Glen	#87 Farnbacher Loles Racing	#86 Farnbacher Loles Racing	#87 Farnbacher Loles Racing	Results
5	Watkins Glen	(Germany) Dirk Werner (United States) Leh Keen	(Germany) Wolf Henzler (United States) Eric Lux	(United States) Leh Keen (Germany) Dirk Werner	Results
6	Mid-Ohio	#99 GAINSCO/Bob Stallings Racing	#6 Michael Shank Racing	#01 Chip Ganassi Racing	Results
6	Mid-Ohio	(United States) Jon Fogarty (United States) Alex Gurney	(Canada) Michael Valiante (United States) John Pew	(United States) Scott Pruett (Mexico) Memo Rojas	Results
6	Mid-Ohio	#86 Farnbacher Loles Racing	#87 Farnbacher Loles Racing	#87 Farnbacher Loles Racing	Results
6	Mid-Ohio	(United States) Eric Lux (Germany) Dominik Farnbacher	(Germany) Dirk Werner (United States) Leh Keen	(United States) Leh Keen (Germany) Dirk Werner	Results
7	Daytona	#01 Chip Ganassi Racing	#99 GAINSCO/Bob Stallings Racing	#10 SunTrust Racing	Results
7	Daytona	(Mexico) Memo Rojas (United States) Scott Pruett	(United States) Alex Gurney (United States) Jon Fogarty	(Italy) Max Angelelli (United States) Brian Frisselle	Results
7	Daytona	#70 SpeedSource	#67 The Racer's Group	#87 Farnbacher Loles Racing	Results
7	Daytona	(United Kingdom) Nick Ham (Canada) Sylvain Tremblay	(United States) Andy Lally (United States) Justin Marks	(United States) Leh Keen (Germany) Dirk Werner	Results
8	Barber	#99 GAINSCO/Bob Stallings Racing	#76 Krohn Racing	#99 GAINSCO/Bob Stallings Racing	Results
8	Barber	(United States) Jon Fogarty (United States) Alex Gurney	(Brazil) Ricardo Zonta (Sweden) Niclas Jönsson	(United States) Jon Fogarty (United States) Alex Gurney	Results
8	Barber	#87 Farnbacher Loles Racing	#57 Stevenson Motorsports	#57 Stevenson Motorsports	Results
8	Barber	(United States) Leh Keen (Germany) Dirk Werner	(United Kingdom) Robin Liddell (United States) Andrew Davis	(United States) Andrew Davis (United Kingdom) Robin Liddell	Results
9	Watkins Glen	#99 GAINSCO/Bob Stallings Racing	#76 Krohn Racing	#76 Krohn Racing	Results
9	Watkins Glen	(United States) Jon Fogarty (United States) Alex Gurney	(Brazil) Ricardo Zonta (Sweden) Niclas Jönsson	(Sweden) Niclas Jönsson (Brazil) Ricardo Zonta	Results
9	Watkins Glen	#87 Farnbacher Loles Racing	#87 Farnbacher Loles Racing	#69 SpeedSource	Results
9	Watkins Glen	(United States) Leh Keen (Germany) Dirk Werner	(Germany) Dirk Werner (United States) Leh Keen	(United States) Emil Assentato (United States) Jeff Segal	Results
10	Montreal	#99 GAINSCO/Bob Stallings Racing	#99 GAINSCO/Bob Stallings Racing	#10 SunTrust Racing	Results
10	Montreal	(United States) Jon Fogarty (United States) Alex Gurney	(United States) Jon Fogarty (United States) Alex Gurney	(Italy) Max Angelelli (United States) Brian Frisselle	Results
10	Montreal	#87 Farnbacher Loles Racing	#30 Racers Edge Motorsports	#57 Stevenson Motorsports	Results
10	Montreal	(United States) Leh Keen (Germany) Dirk Werner	(United States) Tom Sutherland (United States) Dane Cameron	(United States) Andrew Davis (United Kingdom) Robin Liddell	Results
11	Miller	#99 GAINSCO/Bob Stallings Racing	#99 GAINSCO/Bob Stallings Racing	#99 GAINSCO/Bob Stallings Racing	Results
11	Miller	(United States) Jon Fogarty (United States) Alex Gurney	(United States) Alex Gurney (United States) Jon Fogarty	(United States) Jon Fogarty (United States) Alex Gurney	Results
11	Miller	#70 SpeedSource	#57 Stevenson Motorsports	#69 SpeedSource	Results
11	Miller	(United Kingdom) Nick Ham (Canada) Sylvain Tremblay	(United States) Andrew Davis (United Kingdom) Robin Liddell	(United States) Emil Assentato (United States) Jeff Segal	Results
12	Homestead	#99 GAINSCO/Bob Stallings Racing	#90 Spirit of Daytona Racing	#59 Brumos Racing	Results
12	Homestead	(United States) Jon Fogarty (United States) Alex Gurney	(United States) Buddy Rice (Spain) Antonio García	(Portugal) João Barbosa (United States) Hurley Haywood	Results
12	Homestead	#70 SpeedSource	#07 Team Drinkin' Mate	#07 Team Drinkin' Mate	Results
12	Homestead	(United Kingdom) Nick Ham (Canada) Sylvain Tremblay	(United States) Kelly Collins (United States) Paul Edwards	(United States) Kelly Collins (United States) Paul Edwards	Results

== Championship Standings ==
=== Daytona Prototypes ===
==== Driver's ====
Pos	Driver	R24	VIR	NJ	LAG	S6H	LEX	DAY	BAR	WGI	MON	MIL	HOM	Pen	Points
1	(United States) Jon Fogarty	7	1	6	1	16	3	2	1	4	3	1	4	15	337
1	(United States) Alex Gurney	7	1	6	1	16	3	2	1	4	3	1	4	15	337
2	(United States) Scott Pruett	2	12	9	2	1	1	7	2	2	10	3	2	15	331
2	(Mexico) Memo Rojas	2	12	9	2	1	1	7	2	2	10	3	2	15	331
3	(Italy) Max Angelelli	4	13	2	3	2	8	1	14	12	1	2	7		325
3	(United States) Brian Frisselle	4	13	2	3	2	8	1	14	12	1	2	7		325
4	(Germany) Timo Bernhard	6	7	3	6	3	4	11	15	13	2	4	11		296
4	(France) Romain Dumas	6	7	3	6	3	4	11	15	13	2	4	11		296
5	(United States) Burt Frisselle	14	11	5	4	11	7	5	7	7	6	5	8		283
5	(Canada) Mark Wilkins	14	11	5	4	11	7	5	7	7	6	5	8		283
6	(United States) David Donohue	1	3	4	8	15	10	17	10	6	5	9	5	5	282
6	(United States) Darren Law	1	3	4	8	15	10	17	10	6	5	9	5	5	282
7	(Canada) Michael Valiante	19	2	8	7	4	6	4	3	11	8	10	15	3	279
8	(Brazil) Oswaldo Negri Jr.	16	6	13	5	5	16	6	6	9	13	6	3		270
8	(South Africa) Mark Patterson	16	6	13	5	5	16	6	6	9	13	6	3		270
9	(Portugal) João Barbosa	3	8	14	13	6	5	8	9	8	14†	7	1		266
10	(United States) J. C. France	3	8	14	13	6	5	8	9	8	14	7			248
11	(United States) Ricky Taylor	10	14	10	14	10	12	12	12	10	4	8	9		248
12	(United States) John Pew	19†	2	8†	7	4	6	4	3	11	8†	10	15	3	221
13	(United States) Rob Finlay	8	15	12	12	14	13	13	11	17	12	11	16		218
14	(United Kingdom) Andy Wallace	8	15	12	12	14	13	13	11	17†	12	11	16		204
15	(Canada) Mike Forest				14	10	12	12	12	10	4	8	17		181
16	(France) Christophe Bouchut	9	4		9	7	9			3	9		10†		170
17	(Brazil) Ricardo Zonta	18	16†	1	15†	9	2		5	1					163
18	(United States) Brad Jaeger	12	5	7	11	17	15		8	14					159
19	(United States) Jordan Taylor	10			16	10	14	15	13	15			9		146
20	(United States) Memo Gidley	12	5	7	11	17†	15		8	14					145
21	(United States) Jared Beyer	10	14	10	16†		14	15	13	15			17		140
22	(Sweden) Niclas Jönsson	18	16†	1	15	9	2	16	5†	1†					133
23	(United Kingdom) Ryan Dalziel	15				12		3		5	7		13		133
24	(United States) Scott Tucker	9	4		9†	7	9			3	9†		10†		126
25	(United States) Buddy Rice	1				15†		18	4	16†	11		14	5	108
26	(United States) Bill Lester	17	9		10	8		3†		5†	7				104
27	(United States) Guy Cosmo	11	10	11		18†	11	14							98
28	(Spain) Antonio García	1						18†	4	16†	11		14	5	95
29	(United Kingdom) Darren Manning	17	9		10	8									80
30	(United States) Scott Russell	11	10	11†		18†	11	14							78
31	(United States) Hurley Haywood	3				6							1†		55
32	(United States) Terry Borcheller	3											12		49
33	(United States) Tracy Krohn	13						9							40
33	(Belgium) Eric van de Poele	13						9							40
34	(United States) Ryan Hunter-Reay	16											10		36
35	(United States) Carlos de Quesada	15				12									35
36	(Czech Republic) Tomáš Enge	15											12		35
37	(Colombia) Juan Pablo Montoya	2													32
38	(United Kingdom) Ian James	19				12									31
39	(Portugal) Pedro Lamy	4													28
39	(South Africa) Wayne Taylor	4													28
40	(United Kingdom) Darren Turner	18						16							28
41	(New Zealand) Scott Dixon	5													26
41	(United Kingdom) Dario Franchitti	5													26
41	(United Kingdom) Alex Lloyd	5													26
42	(Australia) Ryan Briscoe	6													25
43	(United States) Jimmie Johnson	7													24
43	(United States) Jimmy Vasser	7													24
44	(United States) Bill Auberlen					8									23
45	(United States) Casey Mears	8													23
45	(United States) Danica Patrick	8													23
46	(Brazil) Raphael Matos	9													22
46	(United States) Ed Zabinski	9													22
47	(Mexico) David Martínez	10													21
48	(United States) Kyle Busch							10							21
48	(United States) Scott Speed							10							21
49	(Brazil) Bruno Junqueira					11									20
50	(United States) Jason Pridmore	11													20
50	(United States) Jeff Ward	11													20
51	(Italy) Matteo Bobbi	12													19
51	(Italy) Fabrizio Gollin	12													19
52	(South Africa) Dion von Moltke							19†					13		18
53	(United States) Paul Dallenbach					13									18
53	(United States) Roger Schramm					13									18
54	(United Kingdom) Oliver Gavin	13													18
55	(Canada) John Farano	14									15†				17
55	(United States) Alex Figge	14													17
56	(United States) Chapman Ducote	15													16
56	(Canada) Jean-Francois Dumoulin	15									15†				16
57	(United States) Colin Braun	16													15
58	(United States) Leo Hindery Jr.	17													14
58	(United States) Kyle Petty	17													14
59	(United States) A. J. Allmendinger	19													12
	(Canada) David Empringham	14†													0
	(South Africa) Hennie Groenewald							19†							0
Pos	Driver	R24	VIR	NJ	LAG	S6H	LEX	DAY	BAR	WGI	MON	MIL	HOM	Pen	Points

Colour	Result
Gold	Winner
Silver	Second place
Bronze	Third place
Green	Points classification
Blue	Non-points classification
Blue	Non-classified finish (NC)
Purple	Retired, not classified (Ret)
Red	Did not qualify (DNQ)
Red	Did not pre-qualify (DNPQ)
Black	Disqualified (DSQ)
White	Did not start (DNS)
White	Withdrew (WD)
White	Race cancelled (C)
Blank	Did not practice (DNP)
Blank	Did not arrive (DNA)
Blank	Excluded (EX)

===== Notes =====
- Drivers denoted by † did not complete sufficient laps in order to be classified.

==== Chassis ====
Pos	Chassis	R24	VIR	NJ	LAG	S6H	LEX	DAY	BAR	WGI	MON	MIL	HOM	Pen	Pts
1	(United States) Riley	1	1	3	1	1	1	2	1	2	2	1	1	20	386
2	(Italy) Dallara	4	5	2	3	2	8	1	8	12	1	2	7		339
3	(United Kingdom) Lola	13	16	1	15	9	2	9	5	1					221
4	(United States) Crawford	8	15	12	12	14	13	13	11	15	12	11	16		220
5	(United States) Coyote	11	10	11		18	11	14	4	16	11		14		191
Pos	Chassis	R24	VIR	NJ	LAG	S6H	LEX	DAY	BAR	WGI	MON	MIL	HOM	Pen	Pts

==== Engine ====
Pos	Engine	R24	VIR	NJ	LAG	S6H	LEX	DAY	BAR	WGI	MON	MIL	HOM	Pen	Pts
1	(United States) Ford	4	2	1	3	2	2	1	3	1	1	2	3		386
2	(Germany) Porsche	1	3	3	6	3	4	8	4	6	2	4	1	5	344
3	(United States) Pontiac	7	1	6	1	10	3	2	1	4	3	1	4	15	343
4	(Japan) Lexus	2	12	9	2	1	1	7	2	2	10	3	2	15	331
5	(Germany) BMW	9	4		9	7	9	3		3	7		6		227
6	(United States) Chevrolet							15	11	10	4	8	9		130
7	(Japan) Honda				16		14								32
Pos	Engine	R24	VIR	NJ	LAG	S6H	LEX	DAY	BAR	WGI	MON	MIL	HOM	Pen	Pts

=== Grand Touring ===
==== Driver's ====
Pos	Driver	R24	VIR	NJ	LAG	S6H	LEX	DAY	BAR	WGI	MON	MIL	HOM	Pen	Points
1	(United States) Leh Keen	8	4	1	3	1	1	1	4	2	6	6	3		359
1	(Germany) Dirk Werner	8	4	1	3	1	1	1	4	2	6	6	3		359
2	(United States) Kelly Collins	4	2	15	2	2	3	9	3	5	10	3	1		334
3	(United States) Andrew Davis	6	1	5	6	8	2	16†	1	4	1	7	2	3	317
4	(United States) Paul Edwards	4	2	15	2	2	3	9	3		10	3	1		308
5	(United Kingdom) Nick Ham	17	3	11	1	4	11	2	2	8	12	9	5		301
5	(Canada) Sylvain Tremblay	17	3	11	1	4	11	2	2	8	12	9	5		301
6	(United States) Andy Lally	1	15	4	15	13	8	3	10	6	2	2	12		295
7	(United States) Emil Assentato	9	18†	16	5	6	5	4	6	1	3	1	7		291
7	(United States) Jeff Segal	9	18†	16	5	6	5	4	6	1	3	1	7		291
8	(United Kingdom) Robin Liddell	6	1	5	6	8	2	16†	1	4†	1	7	2	3	289
9	(United States) Eric Lux	5	5	3	8	3	7	6	7	9	5	13	15	15	275
10	(United States) John Potter	21	9	8	7	5	9	10	8	7	9	5	4		271
11	(United States) Joe Foster	22	7	7	10	7	6	11	4	16†	4	11	11		243
12	(United States) Craig Stanton	21	9	8	7	5	9	10	8	7	9	5			243
13	(United States) Spencer Pumpelly	2	6	2	4	5	14	5	9				12		227
14	(United States) Dane Cameron	13	8	9	17†	14	4	12†	13	3	8	12†	6		204
15	(United States) Scott Schroeder	14	11		11	11	12	7	12	14		2			188
16	(United States) Justin Marks	1	15	4	15	13	8	3	10	6†					187
17	(Mexico) Josemanuel Gutiérrez	14	11		11	11	12	7	12	14					156
18	(United States) Bryce Miller	21	8	9	17	14				15†	11	8	10		150
19	(United States) Charles Espenlaub	22	7			7			4	16	4	11			148
20	(United States) Patrick Dempsey	22		7	10	7	6	11					11		143
21	(Germany) Wolf Henzler	16	5			3		6	7			13		15	123
22	(United States) Kevin Roush	5			8					15		8	10		109
23	(United States) Joe Nonnamaker	30†	13	13	16	16	10		11						107
24	(United States) Wayne Nonnamaker	30	13	13	16	16	10		13						106
25	(United States) Tom Sutherland						4	12		3	8				100
26	(United States) Will Nonnamaker	30†	16†	14	14	10	13		11†	11					93
27	(United States) Joe Sahlen	30†	16	14	14	10	13			11†					88
28	(United States) Ted Ballou	2	6	2†	4										85
29	(United States) Bryan Sellers	13		3							5				74
30	(United States) Lawson Aschenbach	20	10	12	9										73
31	(United States) Jeff Westphal	11								12	13	4			67
32	(Canada) Dave Lacey	7				9					11		15†		66
33	(United States) Max Hyatt									12†	13	4	14		63
34	(South Africa) Dion von Moltke	13	12	6	13†										62
35	(Canada) Mike Forest	11	10	12											60
36	(United States) Carey Grant		17†			12	15						8		58
36	(United States) Kevin Grant		17†			12	15						8		58
36	(United States) Milton Grant		17†			12	15						8		58
37	(United States) Shane Lewis	10				15	16†	13							55
38	(United States) Duncan Ende	14				11	14								54
39	(United States) Tim George Jr.	2		10											53
40	(Italy) Diego Alessi	24								10	7				52
41	(Germany) Dominik Farnbacher	5					7								50
42	(United States) Nick Longhi	9				6									47
43	(United States) Steve Johnson	7				9									46
44	(United States) Jim Pace	28						8		13					44
45	(United States) Jack Baldwin	26				9			14						44
46	(United States) Thomas Merrill	11			9										42
47	(United States) Henri Richard				12								9		41
47	(United States) René Villeneuve				12								9		41
48	(United States) R. J. Valentine	1†		10		13									39
49	(United States) Peter Ludwig					14							9		39
50	(Germany) Jörg Bergmeister	1													35
50	(United States) Patrick Long	1													35
51	(United States) Romeo Kapudija	27	14	17	13†										35
52	(United States) Matt Connolly					15			14						33
53	(France) Emmanuel Collard	2													32
53	(Austria) Richard Lietz	2													32
54	(United States) Brendan Gaughan										2				32
55	(Germany) Marco Holzer	21								9					32
56	(United States) Daniel Graeff	16						14							32
56	(United States) Ron Yarab Jr.	16						14							32
57	(Germany) Sascha Maassen	3													30
57	(United States) Phillip Martien	3													30
57	(France) Patrick Pilet	3													30
57	(United States) B. J. Zacharias	3													30
58	(Denmark) Jan Magnussen	4													28
59	(United States) Lance Willsey	20						15							27
60	(United States) Kevin Buckler							5							26
61	(Hong Kong) Matthew Marsh	5													26
62	(United States) Johannes van Overbeek	28						8							26
63	(South Africa) Hennie Groenewald		12†	6											25
64	(Canada) Daniel DiLeo												6		25
65	(United States) Jeff Bucknum	6													25
66	(United Kingdom) Robert Nearn	7													24
66	(United States) James Sofronas	7													24
66	(United Kingdom) Richard Westbrook	7													24
67	(Canada) Chris Green										7				24
68	(United States) Matt Plumb	9													22
69	(Puerto Rico) Gerardo Bonilla	10													21
69	(United States) Jerome Jacalone	10													21
69	(United States) Joe Jacalone	10													21
69	(United States) Randy Pobst	10													21
70	(United States) John Weisberg									10					21
71	(United States) Jim Briody											10			21
71	(United States) Hal Prewitt											10			21
72	(United States) Albert Salvo	11													20
73	(United States) John McMullen Jr.	27						15							20
74	(United States) Galen Bieker	12													19
74	(United States) Ryan Eversley	12													19
74	(United States) James Gue	12													19
74	(United States) Tom Long	12													19
75	(United States) Jade Buford											12			19
76	(United States) Douglas Peterson	13									8†				18
77	(United States) Peter London							13							18
78	(United States) John Tancredi									13					18
79	(Puerto Rico) Bryan Ortiz												13		18
79	(United States) Mike Sweeney												13		18
80	(United States) Ryan Phinny		14	17†											17
81	(United States) Steve Miller	14													17
81	(United States) Chris Pallis	14													17
82	(United States) Cristiano Piquet												14		17
83	(Germany) Pierre Kaffer	15													16
83	(Italy) Giacomo Petrobelli	15													16
83	(Italy) Gabrio Rosa	15													16
83	(Italy) Giorgio Rosa	15													16
83	(Denmark) Allan Simonsen	15													16
84	(Dominican Republic) Richard Campollo	16													15
84	(United States) Michael Gomez	16													15
85	(United States) Shawn Price						16								15
86	(United States) David Haskell	17				4†									14
87	(United States) Jonathan Bomarito	17													14
88	(United States) Kurt Kossmann	18													13
88	(United States) Bruce Ledoux III	18													13
88	(United States) David Quinlan	18													13
88	(United States) Dan Watkins	18													13
88	(United States) Steve Zadig	18													13
89	(Canada) Ross Bentley	19													12
89	(Canada) Keith Carter	19													12
89	(United States) Daniel Herrington	19													12
89	(Canada) Glenn Nixon	19													12
90	(Costa Rica) Milo Valverde	20													11
91	(United States) Tim Lewis Jr.	22													9
91	(United States) Jep Thornton	22													9
92	(Portugal) César Campaniço	23													8
92	(Italy) Luca Drudi	23													8
92	(Italy) Max Papis	23													8
92	(United States) Nathan Swartzbaugh	23													8
93	(United States) Jason Vinkemulder	24				15†									7
94	(United States) Jason Daskalos	24													7
94	(Mexico) Pepe Montaño	24													7
95	(Italy) Constantino Bertuzzi	25													6
95	(Spain) Joe Castellano	25													6
95	(San Marino) Christian Montanari	25													6
95	(Italy) Luca Pirri	25													6
95	(United States) Cort Wagner	25													6
96	(Argentina) Claudio Burtin	26													5
96	(United States) Cory Friedman	26													5
96	(Austria) Martin Ragginger	26													5
97	(United States) John Lewis	27													4
97	(United States) Bob Michaelian	27													4
97	(United States) Jim Michaelian	27													4
98	(United States) Jim Lowe	28						8†							3
99	(United Kingdom) Tim Sugden	28													3
100	(Australia) Owen Kelly	29													2
100	(United States) Boris Said	29													2
	(United States) Leighton Reese									5†	10†	5†			0
	(United States) Patrick Barrett	11†													0
	(United States) Mike Halpin								14†						0
	(Canada) Steve Paquette	19†													0
	(Puerto Rico) Hiram Cruz	20†													0
	(United States) Omar Rodriguez	20†													0
	(United States) Mac McGehee	26†													0
	(Australia) Paul Morris	29†													0
	(United States) Tom Nastasi	29†													0
Pos	Driver	R24	VIR	NJ	LAG	S6H	LEX	DAY	BAR	WGI	MON	MIL	HOM	Pen	Points

Colour	Result
Gold	Winner
Silver	Second place
Bronze	Third place
Green	Points classification
Blue	Non-points classification
Blue	Non-classified finish (NC)
Purple	Retired, not classified (Ret)
Red	Did not qualify (DNQ)
Red	Did not pre-qualify (DNPQ)
Black	Disqualified (DSQ)
White	Did not start (DNS)
White	Withdrew (WD)
White	Race cancelled (C)
Blank	Did not practice (DNP)
Blank	Did not arrive (DNA)
Blank	Excluded (EX)

===== Notes =====
- All drivers denoted by † did not complete sufficient laps to be awarded points.

==== Engine ====
Pos	Engine	R24	VIR	NJ	LAG	S6H	LEX	DAY	BAR	WGI	MON	MIL	HOM	Pen	Points
1	(Germany) Porsche	1	4	1	3	1	1	1	5	2	2	2	3		385
2	(United States) Pontiac	4	1	5	2	2	2	9	1	4	1	3	1	3	367
3	(Japan) Mazda	9	3	7	1	4	4	2	2	1	3	1	5		357
4	(United States) Chevrolet	12	13	13	14	10	10		11	11					154
5	(Germany) BMW									12	13	4	14		82
6	(Italy) Ferrari	23													8
7	(United States) Ford	29													2
Pos	Engine	R24	VIR	NJ	LAG	S6H	LEX	DAY	BAR	WGI	MON	MIL	HOM	Pen	Points
