= 2009 Porsche 250 =

The layout of Barber Motorsports Park

The 2009 Porsche 250 Presented by Bradley Arant was the eighth round of the 2009 Rolex Sports Car Series season. It took place at Barber Motorsports Park on July 19, 2009.

== Race results ==
Class Winners in bold.

Pos	Class	No	Team	Drivers	Chassis	Laps
Pos	Class	No	Team	Drivers	Engine	Laps
1	**DP**	**99**	**GAINSCO/Bob Stallings Racing**	**(United States) Jon Fogarty (United States) Alex Gurney**	**Riley Mk. XX**	**109**
1	**DP**	**99**	**GAINSCO/Bob Stallings Racing**	**(United States) Jon Fogarty (United States) Alex Gurney**	**Pontiac 5.0L V8**	**109**
2	DP	01	Chip Ganassi Racing with Felix Sabates	(United States) Scott Pruett (Mexico) Memo Rojas	Riley Mk. XX	109
2	DP	01	Chip Ganassi Racing with Felix Sabates	(United States) Scott Pruett (Mexico) Memo Rojas	Lexus 5.0L V8	109
3	DP	6	Michael Shank Racing	(United States) John Pew (Canada) Michael Valiante	Riley Mk. XX	109
3	DP	6	Michael Shank Racing	(United States) John Pew (Canada) Michael Valiante	Ford 5.0L V8	109
4	DP	09	Spirit of Daytona Racing	(Spain) Antonio García (United States) Buddy Rice	Coyote CC/08	109
4	DP	09	Spirit of Daytona Racing	(Spain) Antonio García (United States) Buddy Rice	Porsche 5.0L V8	109
5	DP	76	Krohn Racing	(Sweden) Nic Jönsson (Brazil) Ricardo Zonta	Proto-Auto Lola B08/70	109
5	DP	76	Krohn Racing	(Sweden) Nic Jönsson (Brazil) Ricardo Zonta	Ford 5.0L V8	109
6	DP	60	Michael Shank Racing	(Brazil) Oswaldo Negri, Jr. (South Africa) Mark Patterson	Riley Mk. XX	108
6	DP	60	Michael Shank Racing	(Brazil) Oswaldo Negri, Jr. (South Africa) Mark Patterson	Ford 5.0L V8	108
7	DP	61	AIM Autosport	(United States) Burt Frisselle (Canada) Mark Wilkins	Riley Mk. XX	108
7	DP	61	AIM Autosport	(United States) Burt Frisselle (Canada) Mark Wilkins	Ford 5.0L V8	108
8	DP	77	Doran Racing	(United States) Memo Gidley (United States) Brad Jaeger	Dallara DP01	108
8	DP	77	Doran Racing	(United States) Memo Gidley (United States) Brad Jaeger	Ford 5.0L V8	108
9	DP	59	Brumos Racing	(Portugal) João Barbosa (United States) J. C. France	Riley Mk. XI	108
9	DP	59	Brumos Racing	(Portugal) João Barbosa (United States) J. C. France	Porsche 3.99L Flat-6	108
10	DP	58	Brumos Racing	(United States) David Donohue (United States) Darren Law	Riley Mk. XI	108
10	DP	58	Brumos Racing	(United States) David Donohue (United States) Darren Law	Porsche 3.99L Flat-6	108
11	DP	2	Childress-Howard Motorsports	(United States) Rob Finlay (United Kingdom) Andy Wallace	Crawford DP08	107
11	DP	2	Childress-Howard Motorsports	(United States) Rob Finlay (United Kingdom) Andy Wallace	Chevrolet 5.0L V8	107
12	DP	13	Beyer Racing	(Canada) Mike Forest (United States) Ricky Taylor	Riley Mk. XI	109
12	DP	13	Beyer Racing	(Canada) Mike Forest (United States) Ricky Taylor	Chevrolet 5.0L V8	109
13 DNF	DP	5	Beyer Racing	(United States) Jared Beyer (United States) Jordan Taylor	Crawford DP08	106
13 DNF	DP	5	Beyer Racing	(United States) Jared Beyer (United States) Jordan Taylor	Chevrolet 5.0L V8	106
14	DP	10	SunTrust Racing	(Italy) Max Angelelli (United States) Brian Frisselle	Dallara DP01	106
14	DP	10	SunTrust Racing	(Italy) Max Angelelli (United States) Brian Frisselle	Ford 5.0L V8	106
15	DP	12	Penske Racing	(Germany) Timo Bernhard (Australia) Ryan Briscoe (France) Romain Dumas	Riley Mk. XX	106
15	DP	12	Penske Racing	(Germany) Timo Bernhard (Australia) Ryan Briscoe (France) Romain Dumas	Porsche 3.99L Flat-6	106
16	**GT**	**57**	**Stevenson Motorsports**	**(United States) Andrew Davis (United Kingdom) Robin Liddell**	**Pontiac GXP.R**	**103**
16	**GT**	**57**	**Stevenson Motorsports**	**(United States) Andrew Davis (United Kingdom) Robin Liddell**	**Pontiac 6.0L V8**	**103**
17	GT	70	SpeedSource	(United Kingdom) Nick Ham (Canada) Sylvain Tremblay	Mazda RX-8 GT	102
17	GT	70	SpeedSource	(United Kingdom) Nick Ham (Canada) Sylvain Tremblay	Mazda 2.0L 3-Rotor	102
18	GT	07	Team Drinkin' Mate	(United States) Kelly Collins (United States) Paul Edwards	Pontiac GXP.R	102
18	GT	07	Team Drinkin' Mate	(United States) Kelly Collins (United States) Paul Edwards	Pontiac 6.0L V8	102
19	GT	40	Dempsey Racing	(United States) Charles Espenlaub (United States) Joe Foster	Mazda RX-8 GT	101
19	GT	40	Dempsey Racing	(United States) Charles Espenlaub (United States) Joe Foster	Mazda 2.0L 3-Rotor	101
20	GT	87	Farnbacher-Loles Racing	(United States) Leh Keen (Germany) Dirk Werner	Porsche 997 GT3 Cup	101
20	GT	87	Farnbacher-Loles Racing	(United States) Leh Keen (Germany) Dirk Werner	Porsche 3.6L Flat-6	101
21	GT	69	SpeedSource	(United States) Emil Assentato (United States) Jeff Segal	Mazda RX-8 GT	101
21	GT	69	SpeedSource	(United States) Emil Assentato (United States) Jeff Segal	Mazda 2.0L 3-Rotor	101
22	GT	86	Farnbacher-Loles Racing	(Germany) Wolf Henzler (United States) Eric Lux	Porsche 997 GT3 Cup	101
22	GT	86	Farnbacher-Loles Racing	(Germany) Wolf Henzler (United States) Eric Lux	Porsche 3.6L Flat-6	101
23	GT	65	The Racer's Group	(United States) John Potter (United States) Craig Stanton	Porsche 997 GT3 Cup	100
23	GT	65	The Racer's Group	(United States) John Potter (United States) Craig Stanton	Porsche 3.6L Flat-6	100
24	GT	66	The Racer's Group	(United States) John Potter (United States) Spencer Pumpelly	Porsche 997 GT3 Cup	100
24	GT	66	The Racer's Group	(United States) John Potter (United States) Spencer Pumpelly	Porsche 3.6L Flat-6	100
25	GT	67	The Racer's Group	(United States) Andy Lally (United States) Justin Marks	Porsche 997 GT3 Cup	100
25	GT	67	The Racer's Group	(United States) Andy Lally (United States) Justin Marks	Porsche 3.6L Flat-6	100
26	GT	43	Team Sahlen	(United States) Wayne Nonnamaker (United States) Joe Nonnamaker	Chevrolet Corvette C6	100
26	GT	43	Team Sahlen	(United States) Wayne Nonnamaker (United States) Joe Nonnamaker	Chevrolet 5.7L V8	100
27 DNF	GT	68	The Racer's Group	(Mexico) Josémanuel Gutierrez (United States) Scott Schroeder	Porsche 997 GT3 Cup	80
27 DNF	GT	68	The Racer's Group	(Mexico) Josémanuel Gutierrez (United States) Scott Schroeder	Porsche 3.6L Flat-6	80
28	GT	30	Racers Edge Motorsports	(United States) Dane Cameron (United States) Wayne Nonnamaker	Mazda RX-8 GT	56
28	GT	30	Racers Edge Motorsports	(United States) Dane Cameron (United States) Wayne Nonnamaker	Mazda 2.0L 3-Rotor	56
29 DNF	GT	21	Battery Tender/MCM Racing	(United States) Jack Baldwin (United States) Mike Halpin	Pontiac GTO.R	25
29 DNF	GT	21	Battery Tender/MCM Racing	(United States) Jack Baldwin (United States) Mike Halpin	Pontiac 6.0L V8	25
30 DNF	GT	42	Team Sahlen	(United States) Will Nonnamaker	Chevrolet Corvette C6	2
30 DNF	GT	42	Team Sahlen	(United States) Will Nonnamaker	Chevrolet 5.7L V8	2

Rolex Sports Car Series
Previous race: Brumos Porsche 250	2009 season	Next race: Crown Royal 200 at the Glen
