= 2009 Verizon Wireless 250 =

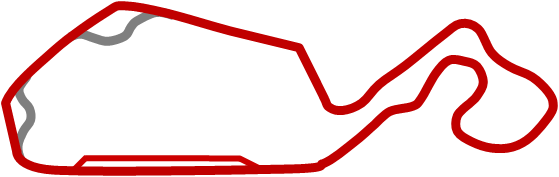
The layout of New Jersey Motorsports Park

The 2009 Verizon Wireless 250 was a sports car race that served as the third round of the 2009 Rolex Sports Car Series season. It took place at New Jersey Motorsports Park on May 3, 2009.

== Race results ==
Class Winners in bold.

Pos	Class	No	Team	Drivers	Chassis	Laps
Pos	Class	No	Team	Drivers	Engine	Laps
1	**DP**	**76**	**Krohn Racing**	**(Sweden) Nic Jönsson (Brazil) Ricardo Zonta**	**Proto-Auto Lola B08/70**	**87**
1	**DP**	**76**	**Krohn Racing**	**(Sweden) Nic Jönsson (Brazil) Ricardo Zonta**	**Ford 5.0L V8**	**87**
2	DP	10	SunTrust Racing	(Italy) Max Angelelli (United States) Brian Frisselle	Dallara DP01	87
2	DP	10	SunTrust Racing	(Italy) Max Angelelli (United States) Brian Frisselle	Ford 5.0L V8	87
3	DP	12	Penske Racing	(Germany) Timo Bernhard (France) Romain Dumas	Riley Mk. XX	87
3	DP	12	Penske Racing	(Germany) Timo Bernhard (France) Romain Dumas	Porsche 3.99L Flat-6	87
4	DP	58	Brumos Racing	(United States) David Donohue (United States) Darren Law	Riley Mk. XI	87
4	DP	58	Brumos Racing	(United States) David Donohue (United States) Darren Law	Porsche 3.99L Flat-6	87
5	DP	61	AIM Autosport	(United States) Burt Frisselle (Canada) Mark Wilkins	Riley Mk. XX	87
5	DP	61	AIM Autosport	(United States) Burt Frisselle (Canada) Mark Wilkins	Ford 5.0L V8	87
6	DP	99	GAINSCO/Bob Stallings Racing	(United States) Jon Fogarty (United States) Alex Gurney	Riley Mk. XX	87
6	DP	99	GAINSCO/Bob Stallings Racing	(United States) Jon Fogarty (United States) Alex Gurney	Pontiac 5.0L V8	87
7	DP	77	Doran Racing	(United States) Memo Gidley (United States) Brad Jaeger	Dallara DP01	86
7	DP	77	Doran Racing	(United States) Memo Gidley (United States) Brad Jaeger	Ford 5.0L V8	86
8	**GT**	**87**	**Farnbacher-Loles Racing**	**(United States) Leh Keen (Germany) Dirk Werner**	**Porsche 997 GT3 Cup**	**86**
8	**GT**	**87**	**Farnbacher-Loles Racing**	**(United States) Leh Keen (Germany) Dirk Werner**	**Porsche 3.6L Flat-6**	**86**
9	GT	66	The Racer's Group	(United States) Ted Ballou (United States) Spencer Pumpelly	Porsche 997 GT3 Cup	85
9	GT	66	The Racer's Group	(United States) Ted Ballou (United States) Spencer Pumpelly	Porsche 3.6L Flat-6	85
10	GT	86	Farnbacher-Loles Racing	(United States) Eric Lux (United States) Bryan Sellers	Porsche 997 GT3 Cup	85
10	GT	86	Farnbacher-Loles Racing	(United States) Eric Lux (United States) Bryan Sellers	Porsche 3.6L Flat-6	85
11	DP	6	Michael Shank Racing	(United States) John Pew (Canada) Michael Valiante	Riley Mk. XX	85
11	DP	6	Michael Shank Racing	(United States) John Pew (Canada) Michael Valiante	Ford 5.0L V8	85
12	GT	67	The Racer's Group	(United States) Andy Lally (United States) Justin Marks	Porsche 997 GT3 Cup	85
12	GT	67	The Racer's Group	(United States) Andy Lally (United States) Justin Marks	Porsche 3.6L Flat-6	85
13	GT	57	Stevenson Motorsports	(United States) Andrew Davis (United Kingdom) Robin Liddell	Pontiac GXP.R	84
13	GT	57	Stevenson Motorsports	(United States) Andrew Davis (United Kingdom) Robin Liddell	Pontiac 6.0L V8	84
14	GT	31	Battery Tender/MCM Racing	(South Africa) Hennie Groenewald (South Africa) Dion von Moltke	Pontiac GTO.R	84
14	GT	31	Battery Tender/MCM Racing	(South Africa) Hennie Groenewald (South Africa) Dion von Moltke	Pontiac 6.0L V8	84
15	GT	40	Dempsey Racing	(United States) Patrick Dempsey (United States) Joe Foster	Mazda RX-8 GT	83
15	GT	40	Dempsey Racing	(United States) Patrick Dempsey (United States) Joe Foster	Mazda 2.0L 3-Rotor	83
16	GT	65	Riegel/Stanton/The Racer's Group	(United States) John Potter (United States) Craig Stanton	Porsche 997 GT3 Cup	83
16	GT	65	Riegel/Stanton/The Racer's Group	(United States) John Potter (United States) Craig Stanton	Porsche 3.6L Flat-6	83
17	GT	30	Racers Edge Motorsports	(United States) Dane Cameron (United States) Bryce Miller	Mazda RX-8 GT	83
17	GT	30	Racers Edge Motorsports	(United States) Dane Cameron (United States) Bryce Miller	Mazda 2.0L 3-Rotor	83
18	GT	68	The Racer's Group	(United States) Tim George, Jr. (United States) R.J. Valentine	Porsche 997 GT3 Cup	83
18	GT	68	The Racer's Group	(United States) Tim George, Jr. (United States) R.J. Valentine	Porsche 3.6L Flat-6	83
19	GT	70	SpeedSource	(United Kingdom) Nick Ham (Canada) Sylvain Tremblay	Mazda RX-8 GT	83
19	GT	70	SpeedSource	(United Kingdom) Nick Ham (Canada) Sylvain Tremblay	Mazda 2.0L 3-Rotor	83
20	GT	32	PR1 Motorsports	(United States) Lawson Achsenbach (Canada) Mike Forest	Pontiac GXP.R	83
20	GT	32	PR1 Motorsports	(United States) Lawson Achsenbach (Canada) Mike Forest	Pontiac 6.0L V8	83
21	DP	01	Chip Ganassi Racing with Felix Sabates	(United States) Scott Pruett (Mexico) Memo Rojas	Riley Mk. XX	82
21	DP	01	Chip Ganassi Racing with Felix Sabates	(United States) Scott Pruett (Mexico) Memo Rojas	Lexus 5.0L V8	82
22	GT	43	Team Sahlen	(United States) Wayne Nonnamaker (United States) Joe Nonnamaker	Chevrolet Corvette C6	82
22	GT	43	Team Sahlen	(United States) Wayne Nonnamaker (United States) Joe Nonnamaker	Chevrolet 5.7L V8	82
23	GT	42	Team Sahlen	(United States) Will Nonnamaker (United States) Joe Sahlen	Chevrolet Corvette C6	79
23	GT	42	Team Sahlen	(United States) Will Nonnamaker (United States) Joe Sahlen	Chevrolet 5.7L V8	79
24	DP	13	Beyer Racing	(United States) Jared Beyer (United States) Ricky Taylor	Riley Mk. XX	79
24	DP	13	Beyer Racing	(United States) Jared Beyer (United States) Ricky Taylor	Pontiac 6.0L V8	79
25	GT	07	Team Drinkin' Mate	(United States) Kelly Collins (United States) Paul Edwards	Pontiac GXP.R	79
25	GT	07	Team Drinkin' Mate	(United States) Kelly Collins (United States) Paul Edwards	Pontiac 5.0L V8	79
26	DP	09	Spirit of Daytona Racing	(United States) Guy Cosmo (United States) Scott Russell	Coyote CC/08	78
26	DP	09	Spirit of Daytona Racing	(United States) Guy Cosmo (United States) Scott Russell	Porsche 5.0L V8	78
27 DNF	GT	69	SpeedSource	(United States) Emil Assentato (United States) Jeff Segal	Mazda RX-8 GT	63
27 DNF	GT	69	SpeedSource	(United States) Emil Assentato (United States) Jeff Segal	Mazda 2.0L 3-Rotor	63
28 DNF	DP	2	Childress-Howard Motorsports	(United States) Rob Finlay (United Kingdom) Andy Wallace	Crawford DP08	59
28 DNF	DP	2	Childress-Howard Motorsports	(United States) Rob Finlay (United Kingdom) Andy Wallace	Pontiac 5.0L V8	59
29 DNF	DP	60	Michael Shank Racing	(Brazil) Oswaldo Negri, Jr. (South Africa) Mark Patterson	Riley Mk. XX	57
29 DNF	DP	60	Michael Shank Racing	(Brazil) Oswaldo Negri, Jr. (South Africa) Mark Patterson	Ford 5.0L V8	57
30	DP	59	Brumos Racing	(Portugal) João Barbosa (United States) J. C. France	Riley Mk. XI	34
30	DP	59	Brumos Racing	(Portugal) João Barbosa (United States) J. C. France	Porsche 3.99L Flat-6	34
31 DNF	GT	21	Battery Tender/MCM Racing	(United States) Romeo Kapudija (United States) Ryan Phinney	Pontiac GTO.R	34
31 DNF	GT	21	Battery Tender/MCM Racing	(United States) Romeo Kapudija (United States) Ryan Phinney	Pontiac 6.0L V8	34

Rolex Sports Car Series
Previous race: Bosch Engineering 250 at VIR	2009 season	Next race: Verizon Festival of Speed
