= 2009 Verizon Festival of Speed =

Track map of WeatherTech Raceway Laguna Seca

The 2009 Verizon Festival of Speed was the fourth round of the 2009 Rolex Sports Car Series season. It took place at Mazda Raceway Laguna Seca on May 17, 2009, and it was the first major auto race to be held at the track in 2009.

== Race results ==
Class Winners in bold.

Pos	Class	No	Team	Drivers	Chassis	Laps
Pos	Class	No	Team	Drivers	Engine	Laps
1	**DP**	**76**	**GAINSCO/Bob Stallings Racing**	**(United States) Jon Fogarty (United States) Alex Gurney**	**Riley Mk. XX**	**106**
1	**DP**	**76**	**GAINSCO/Bob Stallings Racing**	**(United States) Jon Fogarty (United States) Alex Gurney**	**Pontiac 5.0L V8**	**106**
2	DP	01	Chip Ganassi Racing with Felix Sabates	(United States) Scott Pruett (Mexico) Memo Rojas	Riley Mk. XX	106
2	DP	01	Chip Ganassi Racing with Felix Sabates	(United States) Scott Pruett (Mexico) Memo Rojas	Lexus 5.0L V8	106
3	DP	10	SunTrust Racing	(Italy) Max Angelelli (United States) Brian Frisselle	Dallara DP01	106
3	DP	10	SunTrust Racing	(Italy) Max Angelelli (United States) Brian Frisselle	Ford 5.0L V8	106
4	DP	61	AIM Autosport	(United States) Burt Frisselle (Canada) Mark Wilkins	Riley Mk. XX	106
4	DP	61	AIM Autosport	(United States) Burt Frisselle (Canada) Mark Wilkins	Ford 5.0L V8	106
5	DP	60	Michael Shank Racing	(Brazil) Oswaldo Negri, Jr. (South Africa) Mark Patterson	Riley Mk. XX	106
5	DP	60	Michael Shank Racing	(Brazil) Oswaldo Negri, Jr. (South Africa) Mark Patterson	Ford 5.0L V8	106
6	DP	12	Penske Racing	(Germany) Timo Bernhard (France) Romain Dumas	Riley Mk. XX	106
6	DP	12	Penske Racing	(Germany) Timo Bernhard (France) Romain Dumas	Porsche 3.99L Flat-6	106
7	DP	6	Michael Shank Racing	(United States) John Pew (Canada) Michael Valiante	Riley Mk. XX	106
7	DP	6	Michael Shank Racing	(United States) John Pew (Canada) Michael Valiante	Ford 5.0L V8	106
8	DP	58	Brumos Racing	(United States) David Donohue (United States) Darren Law	Riley Mk. XI	106
8	DP	58	Brumos Racing	(United States) David Donohue (United States) Darren Law	Porsche 3.99L Flat-6	106
9	DP	55	Supercar Life Racing	(France) Christophe Bouchut (United States) Scott Tucker	Riley Mk. XX	105
9	DP	55	Supercar Life Racing	(France) Christophe Bouchut (United States) Scott Tucker	BMW 5.0L V8	105
10	DP	45	Orbit Racing	(United States) Bill Lester (United Kingdom) Darren Manning	Riley Mk. XI	105
10	DP	45	Orbit Racing	(United States) Bill Lester (United Kingdom) Darren Manning	BMW 5.0L V8	105
11	DP	77	Doran Racing	(United States) Memo Gidley (United States) Brad Jaeger	Dallara DP01	105
11	DP	77	Doran Racing	(United States) Memo Gidley (United States) Brad Jaeger	Ford 5.0L V8	105
12	DP	2	Childress-Howard Motorsports	(United States) Rob Finlay (United Kingdom) Andy Wallace	Crawford DP08	103
12	DP	2	Childress-Howard Motorsports	(United States) Rob Finlay (United Kingdom) Andy Wallace	Pontiac 5.0L V8	103
13	**GT**	**70**	**SpeedSource**	**(United Kingdom) Nick Ham (Canada) Sylvain Tremblay**	**Mazda RX-8 GT**	**101**
13	**GT**	**70**	**SpeedSource**	**(United Kingdom) Nick Ham (Canada) Sylvain Tremblay**	**Mazda 2.0L 3-Rotor**	**101**
14	GT	07	Team Drinkin' Mate	(United States) Kelly Collins (United States) Paul Edwards	Pontiac GXP.R	101
14	GT	07	Team Drinkin' Mate	(United States) Kelly Collins (United States) Paul Edwards	Pontiac 6.0L V8	101
15	GT	87	Farnbacher-Loles Racing	(United States) Leh Keen (Germany) Dirk Werner	Porsche 997 GT3 Cup	101
15	GT	87	Farnbacher-Loles Racing	(United States) Leh Keen (Germany) Dirk Werner	Porsche 3.6L Flat-6	101
16	GT	66	The Racer's Group	(United States) Ted Ballou (United States) Spencer Pumpelly	Porsche 997 GT3 Cup	101
16	GT	66	The Racer's Group	(United States) Ted Ballou (United States) Spencer Pumpelly	Porsche 3.6L Flat-6	101
17	GT	69	SpeedSource	(United States) Emil Assentato (United States) Jeff Segal	Mazda RX-8 GT	101
17	GT	69	SpeedSource	(United States) Emil Assentato (United States) Jeff Segal	Mazda 2.0L 3-Rotor	101
18	GT	57	Stevenson Motorsports	(United States) Andrew Davis (United Kingdom) Robin Liddell	Pontiac GXP.R	101
18	GT	57	Stevenson Motorsports	(United States) Andrew Davis (United Kingdom) Robin Liddell	Pontiac 6.0L V8	101
19	GT	65	Riegel/Stanton/The Racer's Group	(United States) John Potter (United States) Craig Stanton	Porsche 997 GT3 Cup	100
19	GT	65	Riegel/Stanton/The Racer's Group	(United States) John Potter (United States) Craig Stanton	Porsche 3.6L Flat-6	100
20	GT	86	Farnbacher-Loles Racing	(United States) Eric Lux (United States) Kevin Roush	Porsche 997 GT3 Cup	100
20	GT	86	Farnbacher-Loles Racing	(United States) Eric Lux (United States) Kevin Roush	Porsche 3.6L Flat-6	100
21	GT	32	PR1 Motorsports	(United States) Lawson Achsenbach (United States) Thomas Merrill	Pontiac GXP.R	99
21	GT	32	PR1 Motorsports	(United States) Lawson Achsenbach (United States) Thomas Merrill	Pontiac 6.0L V8	99
22	GT	40	Dempsey Racing	(United States) Patrick Dempsey (United States) Joe Foster	Mazda RX-8 GT	99
22	GT	40	Dempsey Racing	(United States) Patrick Dempsey (United States) Joe Foster	Mazda 2.0L 3-Rotor	99
23	GT	68	The Racer's Group	(Mexico) Josémanuel Gutierrez (United States) Scott Schroeder	Porsche 997 GT3 Cup	99
23	GT	68	The Racer's Group	(Mexico) Josémanuel Gutierrez (United States) Scott Schroeder	Porsche 3.6L Flat-6	99
24	GT	63	The Racer's Group	(United States) Henri Richard (United States) René Villeneuve	Porsche 997 GT3 Cup	99
24	GT	63	The Racer's Group	(United States) Henri Richard (United States) René Villeneuve	Porsche 3.6L Flat-6	99
25	DP	59	Brumos Racing	(Portugal) João Barbosa (United States) J. C. France	Riley Mk. XI	96
25	DP	59	Brumos Racing	(Portugal) João Barbosa (United States) J. C. France	Porsche 3.99L Flat-6	96
26	DP	13	Beyer Racing	(Canada) Mike Forest (United States) Ricky Taylor	Riley Mk. XI	92
26	DP	13	Beyer Racing	(Canada) Mike Forest (United States) Ricky Taylor	Porsche 5.0L V8	92
27	GT	31	Battery Tender/MCM Racing	(United States) Romeo Kapudija (South Africa) Dion von Moltke	Porsche 997 GT3 Cup	84
27	GT	31	Battery Tender/MCM Racing	(United States) Romeo Kapudija (South Africa) Dion von Moltke	Porsche 3.6L Flat-6	84
28	GT	42	Team Sahlen	(United States) Will Nonnamaker (United States) Joe Sahlen	Chevrolet Corvette C6	78
28	GT	42	Team Sahlen	(United States) Will Nonnamaker (United States) Joe Sahlen	Chevrolet 5.7L V8	78
29	GT	67	The Racer's Group	(United States) Andy Lally (United States) Justin Marks	Porsche 997 GT3 Cup	71
29	GT	67	The Racer's Group	(United States) Andy Lally (United States) Justin Marks	Porsche 3.6L Flat-6	71
30 DNF	GT	43	Team Sahlen	(United States) Wayne Nonnamaker (United States) Joe Nonnamaker	Chevrolet Corvette C6	67
30 DNF	GT	43	Team Sahlen	(United States) Wayne Nonnamaker (United States) Joe Nonnamaker	Chevrolet 5.7L V8	67
31 DNF	GT	30	Racers Edge Motorsports	(United States) Dane Cameron (United States) Bryce Miller	Mazda RX-8 GT	35
31 DNF	GT	30	Racers Edge Motorsports	(United States) Dane Cameron (United States) Bryce Miller	Mazda 2.0L 3-Rotor	35
32 DNF	DP	76	Krohn Racing	(Sweden) Nic Jönsson (Brazil) Ricardo Zonta	Proto-Auto Lola B08/70	33
32 DNF	DP	76	Krohn Racing	(Sweden) Nic Jönsson (Brazil) Ricardo Zonta	Ford 5.0L V8	33
33 DNF	DP	5	Beyer Racing	(United States) Jared Beyer (United States) Jordan Taylor	Riley Mk. XX	8
33 DNF	DP	5	Beyer Racing	(United States) Jared Beyer (United States) Jordan Taylor	Honda 3.9L V6	8

Rolex Sports Car Series
Previous race: Verizon Wireless 250	2009 season	Next race: Sahlen's Six Hours of the Glen
