= 2009 Brumos Porsche 250 =

Track map of Daytona International Speedway

The 2009 Brumos Porsche 250 was the seventh round of the 2009 Rolex Sports Car Series season. It took place at Daytona International Speedway on July 4, 2009, and was the second race of the season to be held at the track following the season-opening 24 Hours of Daytona.

== Race results ==
Class Winners in bold.

Pos	Class	No	Team	Drivers	Chassis	Laps
Pos	Class	No	Team	Drivers	Engine	Laps
1	**DP**	**10**	**SunTrust Racing**	**(Italy) Max Angelelli (United States) Brian Frisselle**	**Riley Mk. XX**	**70**
1	**DP**	**10**	**SunTrust Racing**	**(Italy) Max Angelelli (United States) Brian Frisselle**	**Lexus 5.0L V8**	**70**
2	DP	99	GAINSCO/Bob Stallings Racing	(United States) Jon Fogarty (United States) Alex Gurney	Riley Mk. XX	70
2	DP	99	GAINSCO/Bob Stallings Racing	(United States) Jon Fogarty (United States) Alex Gurney	Pontiac 5.0L V8	70
3	DP	45	Orbit Racing	(United Kingdom) Ryan Dalziel (United States) Bill Lester	Riley Mk. XI	70
3	DP	45	Orbit Racing	(United Kingdom) Ryan Dalziel (United States) Bill Lester	BMW 5.0L V8	70
4	DP	6	Michael Shank Racing	(United States) John Pew (Canada) Michael Valiante	Riley Mk. XX	70
4	DP	6	Michael Shank Racing	(United States) John Pew (Canada) Michael Valiante	Ford 5.0L V8	70
5	DP	61	AIM Autosport	(United States) Burt Frisselle (Canada) Mark Wilkins	Riley Mk. XX	70
5	DP	61	AIM Autosport	(United States) Burt Frisselle (Canada) Mark Wilkins	Ford 5.0L V8	70
6	DP	60	Michael Shank Racing	(Brazil) Oswaldo Negri Jr. (South Africa) Mark Patterson	Riley Mk. XX	70
6	DP	60	Michael Shank Racing	(Brazil) Oswaldo Negri Jr. (South Africa) Mark Patterson	Ford 5.0L V8	70
7	DP	01	Chip Ganassi Racing with Felix Sabates	(United States) Scott Pruett (Mexico) Memo Rojas	Riley Mk. XX	70
7	DP	01	Chip Ganassi Racing with Felix Sabates	(United States) Scott Pruett (Mexico) Memo Rojas	Lexus 5.0L V8	70
8	DP	59	Brumos Racing	(Portugal) João Barbosa (United States) J.C. France	Riley Mk. XI	70
8	DP	59	Brumos Racing	(Portugal) João Barbosa (United States) J.C. France	Porsche 3.99L Flat-6	70
9	DP	75	Krohn Racing	(United States) Tracy Krohn (Belgium) Eric van de Poele	Proto-Auto Lola B08/70	70
9	DP	75	Krohn Racing	(United States) Tracy Krohn (Belgium) Eric van de Poele	Ford 5.0L V8	70
10	DP	02	Chip Ganassi Racing with Felix Sabates	(United States) Kyle Busch (United States) Scott Speed	Riley Mk. XI	70
10	DP	02	Chip Ganassi Racing with Felix Sabates	(United States) Kyle Busch (United States) Scott Speed	Lexus 5.0L V8	70
11	DP	12	Penske Racing	(Germany) Timo Bernhard (France) Romain Dumas	Riley Mk. XX	70
11	DP	12	Penske Racing	(Germany) Timo Bernhard (France) Romain Dumas	Porsche 3.99L Flat-6	70
12	DP	13	Beyer Racing	(Canada) Mike Forest (United States) Ricky Taylor	Riley Mk. XI	69
12	DP	13	Beyer Racing	(Canada) Mike Forest (United States) Ricky Taylor	Pontiac 5.0L V8	69
13	DP	2	Childress-Howard Motorsports	(United States) Rob Finlay (United Kingdom) Andy Wallace	Crawford DP08	67
13	DP	2	Childress-Howard Motorsports	(United States) Rob Finlay (United Kingdom) Andy Wallace	Pontiac 5.0L V8	67
14 DNF	DP	09	Spirit of Daytona Racing	(United States) Guy Cosmo (United States) Scott Russell	Coyote CC/08	66
14 DNF	DP	09	Spirit of Daytona Racing	(United States) Guy Cosmo (United States) Scott Russell	Porsche 5.0L V8	66
15	**GT**	**87**	**Farnbacher-Loles Racing**	**(United States) Leh Keen (Germany) Dirk Werner**	**Porsche 997 GT3 Cup**	**66**
15	**GT**	**87**	**Farnbacher-Loles Racing**	**(United States) Leh Keen (Germany) Dirk Werner**	**Porsche 3.6L Flat-6**	**66**
16	GT	70	SpeedSource	(United Kingdom) Nick Ham (Canada) Sylvain Tremblay	Mazda RX-8 GT	66
16	GT	70	SpeedSource	(United Kingdom) Nick Ham (Canada) Sylvain Tremblay	Mazda 2.0L 3-Rotor	66
17	GT	67	The Racer's Group	(United States) Andy Lally (United States) Justin Marks	Porsche 997 GT3 Cup	66
17	GT	67	The Racer's Group	(United States) Andy Lally (United States) Justin Marks	Porsche 3.6L Flat-6	66
18	DP	5	Beyer Racing	(United States) Jared Beyer (United States) Jordan Taylor	Crawford DP08	66
18	DP	5	Beyer Racing	(United States) Jared Beyer (United States) Jordan Taylor	Chevrolet 5.0L V8	66
19	GT	69	SpeedSource	(United States) Emil Assentato (United States) Jeff Segal	Mazda RX-8 GT	66
19	GT	69	SpeedSource	(United States) Emil Assentato (United States) Jeff Segal	Mazda 2.0L 3-Rotor	66
20	GT	66	The Racer's Group	(United States) Kevin Buckler (United States) Spencer Pumpelly	Porsche 997 GT3 Cup	65
20	GT	66	The Racer's Group	(United States) Kevin Buckler (United States) Spencer Pumpelly	Porsche 3.6L Flat-6	65
21	GT	86	Farnbacher-Loles Racing	(Germany) Wolf Henzler (United States) Eric Lux	Porsche 997 GT3 Cup	64
21	GT	86	Farnbacher-Loles Racing	(Germany) Wolf Henzler (United States) Eric Lux	Porsche 3.6L Flat-6	64
22	GT	68	The Racer's Group	(Mexico) Josémanuel Gutierrez (United States) Scott Schroeder	Porsche 997 GT3 Cup	64
22	GT	68	The Racer's Group	(Mexico) Josémanuel Gutierrez (United States) Scott Schroeder	Porsche 3.6L Flat-6	64
23	GT	64	JLowe Racing	(United States) Jim Low (United States) Jim Pace (United States) Johannes van Overbeek	Porsche 997 GT3 Cup	64
23	GT	64	JLowe Racing	(United States) Jim Low (United States) Jim Pace (United States) Johannes van Overbeek	Porsche 3.6L Flat-6	64
24	GT	07	Team Drinkin' Mate	(United States) Kelly Collins (United States) Paul Edwards	Pontiac GXP.R	64
24	GT	07	Team Drinkin' Mate	(United States) Kelly Collins (United States) Paul Edwards	Pontiac 6.0L V8	64
25	GT	65	The Racer's Group	(United States) John Potter (United States) Craig Stanton	Porsche 997 GT3 Cup	64
25	GT	65	The Racer's Group	(United States) John Potter (United States) Craig Stanton	Porsche 3.6L Flat-6	64
26	GT	40	Dempsey Racing	(United States) Patrick Dempsey (United States) Joe Foster	Mazda RX-8 GT	64
26	GT	40	Dempsey Racing	(United States) Patrick Dempsey (United States) Joe Foster	Mazda 2.0L 3-Rotor	64
27	GT	30	Racers Edge Motorsports	(United States) Dane Cameron (United States) Tom Sutherland	Mazda RX-8 GT	64
27	GT	30	Racers Edge Motorsports	(United States) Dane Cameron (United States) Tom Sutherland	Mazda 2.0L 3-Rotor	64
28 DNF	GT	21	Battery Tender/MCM Racing	(United States) Matt Connolly (United States) Shane Lewis (United States) Peter London	Pontiac GTO.R	62
28 DNF	GT	21	Battery Tender/MCM Racing	(United States) Matt Connolly (United States) Shane Lewis (United States) Peter London	Pontiac 6.0L V8	62
29	GT	85	Farnbacher-Loles Racing	(United States) Daniel Graeff (United States) Ron Yarab Jr.	Porsche 997 GT3 Cup	62
29	GT	85	Farnbacher-Loles Racing	(United States) Daniel Graeff (United States) Ron Yarab Jr.	Porsche 3.6L Flat-6	62
30 DNF	DP	76	Krohn Racing	(Sweden) Nic Jönsson (United Kingdom) Darren Turner	Proto-Auto Lola B08/70	59
30 DNF	DP	76	Krohn Racing	(Sweden) Nic Jönsson (United Kingdom) Darren Turner	Ford 5.0L V8	59
31	GT	34	Orbit Racing	(United States) John McMullen Jr. (United States) Lance Willsey	Porsche 997 GT3 Cup	59
31	GT	34	Orbit Racing	(United States) John McMullen Jr. (United States) Lance Willsey	Porsche 3.6L Flat-6	59
32	DP	58	Brumos Racing	(United States) David Donohue (United States) Darren Law	Riley Mk. XI	41
32	DP	58	Brumos Racing	(United States) David Donohue (United States) Darren Law	Porsche 3.99L Flat-6	41
33 DNF	DP	90	Spirit of Daytona Racing	(Spain) Antonio García (United States) Buddy Rice	Coyote CC/09	32
33 DNF	DP	90	Spirit of Daytona Racing	(Spain) Antonio García (United States) Buddy Rice	Porsche 5.0L V8	32
34 DNF	GT	57	Stevenson Motorsports	(United States) Andrew Davis (United Kingdom) Robin Liddell	Pontiac GXP.R	6
34 DNF	GT	57	Stevenson Motorsports	(United States) Andrew Davis (United Kingdom) Robin Liddell	Pontiac 6.0L V8	6
35 DNF	DP	77	Doran Racing	(South Africa) Hennie Groenewald (South Africa) Dion von Moltke	Dallara DP01	0
35 DNF	DP	77	Doran Racing	(South Africa) Hennie Groenewald (South Africa) Dion von Moltke	Ford 5.0L V8	0

Rolex Sports Car Series
Previous race: EMCO Gears Classic	2009 season	Next race: Porsche 250
