= 2009 Crown Royal 200 at the Glen =

Track Map of Watkins Glen International.

The 2009 Crown Royal 200 at the Glen was the ninth round of the 2009 Rolex Sports Car Series season. It took place at Watkins Glen International on August 7, 2009.

== Race results ==
Class Winners in bold.

Pos	Class	No	Team	Drivers	Chassis	Laps
Pos	Class	No	Team	Drivers	Engine	Laps
1	**DP**	**76**	**Krohn Racing**	**(Sweden) Nic Jönsson (Brazil) Ricardo Zonta**	**Proto-Auto Lola B08/70**	**93**
1	**DP**	**76**	**Krohn Racing**	**(Sweden) Nic Jönsson (Brazil) Ricardo Zonta**	**Ford 5.0L V8**	**93**
2	DP	01	Chip Ganassi Racing with Felix Sabates	(United States) Scott Pruett (Mexico) Memo Rojas	Riley Mk. XX	93
2	DP	01	Chip Ganassi Racing with Felix Sabates	(United States) Scott Pruett (Mexico) Memo Rojas	Lexus 5.0L V8	93
3	DP	55	Supercar Life Racing/Level 5	(France) Christophe Bouchut (United States) Scott Tucker	Riley Mk. XX	93
3	DP	55	Supercar Life Racing/Level 5	(France) Christophe Bouchut (United States) Scott Tucker	BMW 5.0L V8	93
4	DP	99	GAINSCO/Bob Stallings Racing	(United States) Jon Fogarty (United States) Alex Gurney	Riley Mk. XX	93
4	DP	99	GAINSCO/Bob Stallings Racing	(United States) Jon Fogarty (United States) Alex Gurney	Porsche 5.0L V8	93
5	DP	45	Orbit Racing	(United Kingdom) Ryan Dalziel (United States) Bill Lester	Riley Mk. XI	93
5	DP	45	Orbit Racing	(United Kingdom) Ryan Dalziel (United States) Bill Lester	BMW 5.0L V8	93
6	DP	58	Brumos Racing	(United States) David Donohue (United States) Darren Law	Riley Mk. XI	93
6	DP	58	Brumos Racing	(United States) David Donohue (United States) Darren Law	Porsche 3.99L Flat-6	93
7	DP	61	AIM Autosport	(United States) Burt Frisselle (Canada) Mark Wilkins	Riley Mk. XX	93
7	DP	61	AIM Autosport	(United States) Burt Frisselle (Canada) Mark Wilkins	Ford 5.0L V8	93
8	DP	59	Brumos Racing	(Portugal) João Barbosa (United States) J.C. France	Riley Mk. XI	93
8	DP	59	Brumos Racing	(Portugal) João Barbosa (United States) J.C. France	Porsche 3.99L Flat-6	93
9	DP	60	Michael Shank Racing	(Brazil) Oswaldo Negri Jr. (South Africa) Mark Patterson	Riley Mk. XX	93
9	DP	60	Michael Shank Racing	(Brazil) Oswaldo Negri Jr. (South Africa) Mark Patterson	Ford 5.0L V8	93
10	DP	13	Beyer Racing	(Canada) Mike Forest (United States) Ricky Taylor	Riley Mk. XI	92
10	DP	13	Beyer Racing	(Canada) Mike Forest (United States) Ricky Taylor	Chevrolet 5.0L V8	92
11	DP	6	Michael Shank Racing	(United States) John Pew (Canada) Michael Valiante	Riley Mk. XX	92
11	DP	6	Michael Shank Racing	(United States) John Pew (Canada) Michael Valiante	Ford 5.0L V8	92
12	DP	10	SunTrust Racing	(Italy) Max Angelelli (United States) Brian Frisselle	Dallara DP01	92
12	DP	10	SunTrust Racing	(Italy) Max Angelelli (United States) Brian Frisselle	Ford 5.0L V8	92
13	DP	12	Penske Racing	(Germany) Timo Bernhard (France) Romain Dumas	Riley Mk. XX	92
13	DP	12	Penske Racing	(Germany) Timo Bernhard (France) Romain Dumas	Porsche 3.99L Flat-6	92
14	DP	77	Doran Racing	(United States) Memo Gidley (United States) Brad Jaeger	Dallara DP01	92
14	DP	77	Doran Racing	(United States) Memo Gidley (United States) Brad Jaeger	Ford 5.0L V8	92
15	DP	5	Beyer Racing	(United States) Jared Beyer (United States) Jordan Taylor	Crawford DP08	90
15	DP	5	Beyer Racing	(United States) Jared Beyer (United States) Jordan Taylor	Chevrolet 5.0L V8	90
16	**GT**	**69**	**SpeedSource**	**(United States) Emil Assentato (United States) Jeff Segal**	**Mazda RX-8 GT**	**87**
16	**GT**	**69**	**SpeedSource**	**(United States) Emil Assentato (United States) Jeff Segal**	**Mazda 2.0L 3-Rotor**	**87**
17	GT	87	Farnbacher-Loles Racing	(United States) Leh Keen (Germany) Dirk Werner	Porsche 997 GT3 Cup	87
17	GT	87	Farnbacher-Loles Racing	(United States) Leh Keen (Germany) Dirk Werner	Porsche 3.6L Flat-6	87
18	GT	30	Racers Edge Motorsports	(United States) Dane Cameron (United States) Tom Sutherland	Mazda RX-8 GT	87
18	GT	30	Racers Edge Motorsports	(United States) Dane Cameron (United States) Tom Sutherland	Mazda 2.0L 3-Rotor	87
19	GT	57	Stevenson Motorsports	(United States) Andrew David (United Kingdom) Robin Liddell	Pontiac GXP.R	87
19	GT	57	Stevenson Motorsports	(United States) Andrew David (United Kingdom) Robin Liddell	Pontiac 6.0L V8	87
20	GT	07	Team Drinkin' Mate	(United States) Kelly Collins (United States) Leighton Reese	Pontiac GXP.R	87
20	GT	07	Team Drinkin' Mate	(United States) Kelly Collins (United States) Leighton Reese	Pontiac 6.0L V8	87
21	GT	66	The Racer's Group	(United States) Andy Lally (United States) Justin Marks	Porsche 997 GT3 Cup	87
21	GT	66	The Racer's Group	(United States) Andy Lally (United States) Justin Marks	Porsche 3.6L Flat-6	87
22	GT	65	The Racer's Group	(United States) John Potter (United States) Craig Stanton	Porsche 997 GT3 Cup	86
22	GT	65	The Racer's Group	(United States) John Potter (United States) Craig Stanton	Porsche 3.6L Flat-6	86
23	GT	70	SpeedSource	(United Kingdom) Nick Ham (Canada) Sylvain Tremblay	Mazda RX-8 GT	86
23	GT	70	SpeedSource	(United Kingdom) Nick Ham (Canada) Sylvain Tremblay	Mazda 2.0L 3-Rotor	86
24	GT	86	Farnbacher-Loles Racing	(Germany) Marco Holzer (United States) Eric Lux	Porsche 997 GT3 Cup	85
24	GT	86	Farnbacher-Loles Racing	(Germany) Marco Holzer (United States) Eric Lux	Porsche 3.6L Flat-6	85
25	GT	21	Battery Tender/MCM Racing	(Italy) Diego Alessi (United States) John Weisberg	Pontiac GTO.R	84
25	GT	21	Battery Tender/MCM Racing	(Italy) Diego Alessi (United States) John Weisberg	Pontiac 6.0L V8	84
26	GT	42	Team Sahlen	(United States) Will Nonnamaker (United States) Joe Sahlen	Chevrolet Corvette C6	84
26	GT	42	Team Sahlen	(United States) Will Nonnamaker (United States) Joe Sahlen	Chevrolet 5.7L V8	84
27	GT	32	Miracle Sealants Team PR1	(United States) Max Hyatt (United States) Jeff Westphal	BMW M6	82
27	GT	32	Miracle Sealants Team PR1	(United States) Max Hyatt (United States) Jeff Westphal	Pontiac 6.0L V8	82
28	GT	84	Farnbacher-Loles Racing	(United States) Jim Pace (United States) John Tancredi	Porsche 997 GT3 Cup	80
28	GT	84	Farnbacher-Loles Racing	(United States) Jim Pace (United States) John Tancredi	Porsche 3.6L Flat-6	80
29	GT	68	The Racer's Group	(Mexico) Josémanuel Gutierrez (United States) Scott Schroeder	Porsche 997 GT3 Cup	72
29	GT	68	The Racer's Group	(Mexico) Josémanuel Gutierrez (United States) Scott Schroeder	Porsche 3.6L Flat-6	72
30 DNF	GT	48	Miller-Barrett Racing	(United States) Bryce Miller (United States) Kevin Roush	Porsche 997 GT3 Cup	65
30 DNF	GT	48	Miller-Barrett Racing	(United States) Bryce Miller (United States) Kevin Roush	Porsche 3.6L Flat-6	65
31 DNF	GT	40	Dempsey Racing	(United States) Charles Espenlaub (United States) Joe Foster	Mazda RX-8 GT	47
31 DNF	GT	40	Dempsey Racing	(United States) Charles Espenlaub (United States) Joe Foster	Mazda 2.0L 3-Rotor	47
32 DNF	DP	90	Spirit of Daytona Racing	(Spain) Antonio García (United States) Buddy Rice	Coyote CC/09	32
32 DNF	DP	90	Spirit of Daytona Racing	(Spain) Antonio García (United States) Buddy Rice	Porsche 5.0L V8	32
33 DNF	DP	2	Childress-Howard Motorsports	(United States) Rob Finlay (United Kingdom) Andy Wallace	Crawford DP08	27
33 DNF	DP	2	Childress-Howard Motorsports	(United States) Rob Finlay (United Kingdom) Andy Wallace	Chevrolet 5.0L V8	27
DNS	DP	95	Supercar Life Racing/Level 5	(France) Christophe Bouchut (United States) Scott Tucker	Riley Mk. XX	-
DNS	DP	95	Supercar Life Racing/Level 5	(France) Christophe Bouchut (United States) Scott Tucker	BMW 5.0L V8	-
DNS	GT	43	Team Sahlen	(United States) Wayne Nonnamaker (United States) Joe Nonnamaker	Chevrolet Corvette C6	-
DNS	GT	43	Team Sahlen	(United States) Wayne Nonnamaker (United States) Joe Nonnamaker	Chevrolet 5.7L V8	-

Rolex Sports Car Series
Previous race: Porsche 250	2009 season	Next race: Montréal 200
