= 2009 EMCO Gears Classic =

The layout of Mid-Ohio Sports Car Course

The 2009 EMCO Gears Classic was the sixth sports car round of the 2009 Rolex Sports Car Series season. It took place at Mid-Ohio Sports Car Course on June 20, 2009.

== Race results ==
Class Winners in bold.

Pos	Class	No	Team	Drivers	Chassis	Laps
Pos	Class	No	Team	Drivers	Engine	Laps
1	**DP**	**01**	**Chip Ganassi Racing with Felix Sabates**	**(United States) Scott Pruett (Mexico) Memo Rojas**	**Riley Mk. XX**	**111**
1	**DP**	**01**	**Chip Ganassi Racing with Felix Sabates**	**(United States) Scott Pruett (Mexico) Memo Rojas**	**Lexus 5.0L V8**	**111**
2	DP	76	Krohn Racing	(Sweden) Nic Jönsson (Brazil) Ricardo Zonta	Proto-Auto Lola B08/70	111
2	DP	76	Krohn Racing	(Sweden) Nic Jönsson (Brazil) Ricardo Zonta	Ford 5.0L V8	111
3	DP	99	GAINSCO/Bob Stallings Racing	(United States) Jon Fogarty (United States) Alex Gurney	Riley Mk. XX	111
3	DP	99	GAINSCO/Bob Stallings Racing	(United States) Jon Fogarty (United States) Alex Gurney	Pontiac 5.0L V8	111
4	DP	12	Penske Racing	(Germany) Timo Bernhard (France) Romain Dumas	Riley Mk. XX	111
4	DP	12	Penske Racing	(Germany) Timo Bernhard (France) Romain Dumas	Porsche 3.99L Flat-6	111
5	DP	59	Brumos Racing	(Portugal) João Barbosa (United States) J. C. France	Riley Mk. XI	111
5	DP	59	Brumos Racing	(Portugal) João Barbosa (United States) J. C. France	Porsche 3.99L Flat-6	111
6	DP	6	Michael Shank Racing	(United States) John Pew (Canada) Michael Valiante	Riley Mk. XX	111
6	DP	6	Michael Shank Racing	(United States) John Pew (Canada) Michael Valiante	Ford 5.0L V8	111
7	DP	61	AIM Autosport	(United States) Burt Frisselle (Canada) Mark Wilkins	Riley Mk. XX	111
7	DP	61	AIM Autosport	(United States) Burt Frisselle (Canada) Mark Wilkins	Ford 5.0L V8	111
8	DP	10	SunTrust Racing	(Italy) Max Angelelli (United States) Brian Frisselle	Dallara DP08	111
8	DP	10	SunTrust Racing	(Italy) Max Angelelli (United States) Brian Frisselle	Ford 5.0L V8	111
9	DP	55	Supercar Life Racing/Level 5	(France) Christophe Bouchut (United States) Scott Tucker	Riley Mk. XX	111
9	DP	55	Supercar Life Racing/Level 5	(France) Christophe Bouchut (United States) Scott Tucker	BMW 5.0L V8	111
10	DP	58	Brumos Racing	(United States) David Donohue (United States) Darren Law	Riley Mk. XI	111
10	DP	58	Brumos Racing	(United States) David Donohue (United States) Darren Law	Porsche 3.99L Flat-6	111
11	DP	09	Spirit of Daytona Racing	(United States) Guy Cosmo (United States) Scott Russell	Coyote CC/08	110
11	DP	09	Spirit of Daytona Racing	(United States) Guy Cosmo (United States) Scott Russell	Porsche 5.0L V8	110
12	DP	13	Beyer Racing	(Canada) Mike Forest (United States) Ricky Taylor	Riley Mk. XI	109
12	DP	13	Beyer Racing	(Canada) Mike Forest (United States) Ricky Taylor	Pontiac 5.0L V8	109
13	**GT**	**87**	**Farnbacher-Loles Racing**	**(United States) Leh Keen (Germany) Dirk Werner**	**Porsche 997 GT3 Cup**	**106**
13	**GT**	**87**	**Farnbacher-Loles Racing**	**(United States) Leh Keen (Germany) Dirk Werner**	**Porsche 3.6L Flat-6**	**106**
14	GT	57	Stevenson Motorsports	(United States) Andrew Davis (United Kingdom) Robin Liddell	Pontiac GXP.R	106
14	GT	57	Stevenson Motorsports	(United States) Andrew Davis (United Kingdom) Robin Liddell	Pontiac 6.0L V8	106
15	GT	07	Team Drinkin' Mate	(United States) Kelly Collins (United States) Paul Edwards	Pontiac GXP.R	106
15	GT	07	Team Drinkin' Mate	(United States) Kelly Collins (United States) Paul Edwards	Pontiac 6.0L V8	106
16	GT	30	Racers Edge Motorsports	(United States) Dane Cameron (United States) Tom Sutherland	Mazda RX-8 GT	106
16	GT	30	Racers Edge Motorsports	(United States) Dane Cameron (United States) Tom Sutherland	Mazda 2.0L 3-Rotor	106
17	GT	69	SpeedSource	(United States) Emil Assentato (United States) Jeff Segal	Mazda RX-8 GT	106
17	GT	69	SpeedSource	(United States) Emil Assentato (United States) Jeff Segal	Mazda 2.0L 3-Rotor	106
18	GT	40	Dempsey Racing	(United States) Patrick Dempsey (United States) Charles Espenlaub (United States) Joe Foster	Mazda RX-8 GT	105
18	GT	40	Dempsey Racing	(United States) Patrick Dempsey (United States) Charles Espenlaub (United States) Joe Foster	Mazda 2.0L 3-Rotor	105
19	GT	86	Farnbacher-Loles Racing	(Germany) Dominik Farnbacher (United States) Eric Lux	Porsche 997 GT3 Cup	105
19	GT	86	Farnbacher-Loles Racing	(Germany) Dominik Farnbacher (United States) Eric Lux	Porsche 3.6L Flat-6	105
20	GT	67	The Racer's Group	(United States) Andy Lally (United States) Justin Marks	Porsche 997 GT3 Cup	105
20	GT	67	The Racer's Group	(United States) Andy Lally (United States) Justin Marks	Porsche 3.6L Flat-6	105
21	GT	65	Riegel/Stanton/The Racer's Group	(United States) John Potter (United States) Craig Stanton	Porsche 997 GT3 Cup	105
21	GT	65	Riegel/Stanton/The Racer's Group	(United States) John Potter (United States) Craig Stanton	Porsche 3.6L Flat-6	105
22	GT	43	Team Sahlen	(United States) Wayne Nonnamaker (United States) Joe Nonnamaker	Chevrolet Corvette C6	104
22	GT	43	Team Sahlen	(United States) Wayne Nonnamaker (United States) Joe Nonnamaker	Chevrolet 5.7L V8	104
23	GT	70	SpeedSource	(United Kingdom) Nick Ham (Canada) Sylvain Tremblay	Mazda RX-8 GT	104
23	GT	70	SpeedSource	(United Kingdom) Nick Ham (Canada) Sylvain Tremblay	Mazda 2.0L 3-Rotor	104
24	GT	68	The Racer's Group	(Mexico) Josémanuel Gutierrez (United States) Scott Schroeder	Porsche 997 GT3 Cup	98
24	GT	68	The Racer's Group	(Mexico) Josémanuel Gutierrez (United States) Scott Schroeder	Porsche 3.6L Flat-6	98
25 DNF	GT	42	Team Sahlen	(United States) Will Nonnamaker (United States) Jose Foster	Chevrolet Corvette C6	95
25 DNF	GT	42	Team Sahlen	(United States) Will Nonnamaker (United States) Jose Foster	Chevrolet 5.7L V8	95
26	GT	66	The Racer's Group	(United States) Duncan Ende (United States) Spencer Pumpelly	Porsche 997 GT3 Cup	92
26	GT	66	The Racer's Group	(United States) Duncan Ende (United States) Spencer Pumpelly	Porsche 3.6L Flat-6	92
27	DP	2	Childress-Howard Motorsports	(United States) Rob Finlay (United Kingdom) Andy Wallace	Crawford DP08	91
27	DP	2	Childress-Howard Motorsports	(United States) Rob Finlay (United Kingdom) Andy Wallace	Pontiac 5.0L V8	91
28 DNF	DP	5	Beyer Racing	(United States) Jared Beyer (United States) Jordan Taylor	Riley Mk. XI	90
28 DNF	DP	5	Beyer Racing	(United States) Jared Beyer (United States) Jordan Taylor	Honda 3.9L V6	90
29 DNF	DP	77	Doran Racing	(United States) Memo Gidley (United States) Brad Jaeger	Dallara DP01	87
29 DNF	DP	77	Doran Racing	(United States) Memo Gidley (United States) Brad Jaeger	Ford 5.0L V8	87
30 DNF	DP	60	Michael Shank Racing	(Brazil) Oswaldo Negri, Jr. (South Africa) Mark Patterson	Riley Mk. XX	85
30 DNF	DP	60	Michael Shank Racing	(Brazil) Oswaldo Negri, Jr. (South Africa) Mark Patterson	Ford 5.0L V8	85
31 DNF	GT	71	Synergy Racing	(United States) Carey Grant (United States) Kevin Grant (United States) Milton Grant	Porsche 997 GT3 Cup	84
31 DNF	GT	71	Synergy Racing	(United States) Carey Grant (United States) Kevin Grant (United States) Milton Grant	Porsche 3.6L Flat-6	84
32 DNF	GT	21	Battery Tender/MCM Racing	(United States) Shane Lewis (United States) Shawn Price	Pontiac GTO.R	36
32 DNF	GT	21	Battery Tender/MCM Racing	(United States) Shane Lewis (United States) Shawn Price	Pontiac 6.0L V8	36

Rolex Sports Car Series
Previous race: Sahlen's Six Hours of the Glen	2009 season	Next race: Brumos Porsche 250
