= 2009 Bosch Engineering 250 at VIR =

Track map of VIR

The 2009 Bosch Engineering 250 at VIR was a sports car race that served as the second round of the 2009 Rolex Sports Car Series season. It took place at Virginia International Raceway on April 25, 2009.

== Race results ==
Class Winners in bold.

Pos	Class	No	Team	Drivers	Chassis	Laps
Pos	Class	No	Team	Drivers	Engine	Laps
1	**DP**	**99**	**GAINSCO/Bob Stallings Racing**	**(United States) Jon Fogarty (United States) Alex Gurney**	**Riley Mk. XX**	**81**
1	**DP**	**99**	**GAINSCO/Bob Stallings Racing**	**(United States) Jon Fogarty (United States) Alex Gurney**	**Pontiac 5.0L V8**	**81**
2	DP	6	Michael Shank Racing	(United States) Ian James (Canada) Michael Valiante	Riley Mk. XX	81
2	DP	6	Michael Shank Racing	(United States) Ian James (Canada) Michael Valiante	Ford 5.0L V8	81
3	DP	58	Brumos Racing	(United States) David Donohue (United States) Darren Law	Riley Mk. XI	81
3	DP	58	Brumos Racing	(United States) David Donohue (United States) Darren Law	Porsche 3.99L Flat-6	81
4	DP	55	Supercar Life Racing	(France) Christophe Bouchut (United States) Scott Tucker	Riley Mk. XX	81
4	DP	55	Supercar Life Racing	(France) Christophe Bouchut (United States) Scott Tucker	BMW 5.0L V8	81
5	DP	77	Doran Racing	(United States) Memo Gidley (United States) Brad Jaeger	Dallara DP01	81
5	DP	77	Doran Racing	(United States) Memo Gidley (United States) Brad Jaeger	Ford 5.0L V8	81
6	DP	60	Michael Shank Racing	(Brazil) Oswaldo Negri, Jr. (South Africa) Mark Patterson	Riley Mk. XX	81
6	DP	60	Michael Shank Racing	(Brazil) Oswaldo Negri, Jr. (South Africa) Mark Patterson	Ford 5.0L V8	81
7	DP	12	Penske Racing	(Germany) Timo Bernhard (France) Romain Dumas	Riley Mk. XX	81
7	DP	12	Penske Racing	(Germany) Timo Bernhard (France) Romain Dumas	Porsche 3.99L Flat-6	81
8	DP	59	Brumos Racing	(Portugal) João Barbosa (United States) J.C. France	Riley Mk. XI	81
8	DP	59	Brumos Racing	(Portugal) João Barbosa (United States) J.C. France	Porsche 3.99L Flat-6	81
9	DP	45	Orbit Racing	(United States) Bill Lester (United Kingdom) Darren Manning	Riley Mk. XX	80
9	DP	45	Orbit Racing	(United States) Bill Lester (United Kingdom) Darren Manning	BMW 5.0L V8	80
10	DP	09	Spirit of Daytona Racing	(United States) Guy Cosmo (United States) Scott Russell	Coyote CC/08	79
10	DP	09	Spirit of Daytona Racing	(United States) Guy Cosmo (United States) Scott Russell	Porsche 5.0L V8	79
11	DP	61	AIM Autosport	(United States) Burt Frisselle (Canada) Mark Wilkins	Riley Mk. XX	79
11	DP	61	AIM Autosport	(United States) Burt Frisselle (Canada) Mark Wilkins	Porsche 3.6L Flat-6	79
12 DNF	DP	01	Chip Ganassi Racing with Felix Sabates	(United States) Scott Pruett (Mexico) Memo Rojas	Riley Mk. XX	78
12 DNF	DP	01	Chip Ganassi Racing with Felix Sabates	(United States) Scott Pruett (Mexico) Memo Rojas	Lexus 5.0L V8	78
13 DNF	DP	10	SunTrust Racing	(Italy) Max Angelelli (United States) Brian Frisselle	Dallara DP01	78
13 DNF	DP	10	SunTrust Racing	(Italy) Max Angelelli (United States) Brian Frisselle	Ford 5.0L V8	78
14	**GT**	**57**	**Stevenson Motorsports**	**(United States) Andrew Davis (United Kingdom) Robin Liddell**	**Pontiac GXP.R**	**78**
14	**GT**	**57**	**Stevenson Motorsports**	**(United States) Andrew Davis (United Kingdom) Robin Liddell**	**Pontiac 6.0L V8**	**78**
15	GT	07	Banner Racing	(United States) Kelly Collins (United States) Paul Edwards	Pontiac GXP.R	78
15	GT	07	Banner Racing	(United States) Kelly Collins (United States) Paul Edwards	Pontiac 6.0L V8	78
16	GT	70	SpeedSource	(United Kingdom) Nick Ham (Canada) Sylvain Tremblay	Mazda RX-8 GT	78
16	GT	70	SpeedSource	(United Kingdom) Nick Ham (Canada) Sylvain Tremblay	Mazda 2.0L 3-Rotor	78
17	GT	87	Farnbacher-Loles Racing	(United States) Leh Keen (Germany) Dirk Werner	Porsche 997 GT3 Cup	78
17	GT	87	Farnbacher-Loles Racing	(United States) Leh Keen (Germany) Dirk Werner	Porsche 3.6L Flat-6	78
18	GT	86	Farnbacher-Loles Racing	(Germany) Wolf Henzler (United States) Eric Lux	Porsche 997 GT3 Cup	78
18	GT	86	Farnbacher-Loles Racing	(Germany) Wolf Henzler (United States) Eric Lux	Porsche 3.6L Flat-6	78
19	GT	66	The Racer's Group	(United States) Ted Ballou (United States) Spencer Pumpelly	Porsche 997 GT3 Cup	78
19	GT	66	The Racer's Group	(United States) Ted Ballou (United States) Spencer Pumpelly	Porsche 3.6L Flat-6	78
20	GT	40	Dempsey Racing	(United States) Charles Espenlaub (United States) Joe Foster	Mazda RX-8 GT	78
20	GT	40	Dempsey Racing	(United States) Charles Espenlaub (United States) Joe Foster	Mazda 2.0L 3-Rotor	78
21	GT	30	Racers Edge Motorsports	(United States) Dane Cameron (United States) Bryce Miller	Mazda RX-8 GT	78
21	GT	30	Racers Edge Motorsports	(United States) Dane Cameron (United States) Bryce Miller	Mazda 2.0L 3-Rotor	78
22	GT	65	Riegel/Stanton/The Racer's Group	(United States) John Potter (United States) Craig Stanton	Porsche 997 GT3 Cup	78
22	GT	65	Riegel/Stanton/The Racer's Group	(United States) John Potter (United States) Craig Stanton	Porsche 3.6L Flat-6	78
23	GT	32	PR1 Motorsports	(United States) Lawson Aschenbach (Canada) Mike Forest	Pontiac GXP.R	77
23	GT	32	PR1 Motorsports	(United States) Lawson Aschenbach (Canada) Mike Forest	Pontiac 6.0L V8	77
24	GT	68	The Racer's Group	(Mexico) Josémanuel Gutierrez (United States) Scott Schroeder	Porsche 997 GT3 Cup	77
24	GT	68	The Racer's Group	(Mexico) Josémanuel Gutierrez (United States) Scott Schroeder	Porsche 3.6L Flat-6	77
25	DP	13	Beyer Racing	(United States) Jared Beyer (United States) Ricky Taylor	Riley Mk. XI	75
25	DP	13	Beyer Racing	(United States) Jared Beyer (United States) Ricky Taylor	Pontiac 5.0L V8	75
26 DNF	DP	2	Childress-Howard Motorsports	(United States) Rob Finlay (United Kingdom) Andy Wallace	Crawford DP08	73
26 DNF	DP	2	Childress-Howard Motorsports	(United States) Rob Finlay (United Kingdom) Andy Wallace	Pontiac 5.0L V8	73
27 DNF	GT	31	Battery Tender/MCM Racing	(South Africa) Hennie Groenewald (South Africa) Dion von Moltke	Porsche 997 GT3 Cup	64
27 DNF	GT	31	Battery Tender/MCM Racing	(South Africa) Hennie Groenewald (South Africa) Dion von Moltke	Porsche 3.6L Flat-6	64
28	GT	43	Team Sahlen	(United States) Wayne Nonnamaker (United States) Joe Nonnamaker	Chevrolet Corvette C6	52
28	GT	43	Team Sahlen	(United States) Wayne Nonnamaker (United States) Joe Nonnamaker	Chevrolet 5.7L V8	52
29 DNF	GT	21	Battery Tender/MCM Racing	(United States) Romeo Kapudija (United States) Ryan Phinney	Pontiac GTO.R	37
29 DNF	GT	21	Battery Tender/MCM Racing	(United States) Romeo Kapudija (United States) Ryan Phinney	Pontiac 6.0L V8	37
30	GT	67	The Racer's Group	(United States) Andy Lally (United States) Justin Marks	Porsche 997 GT3 Cup	33
30	GT	67	The Racer's Group	(United States) Andy Lally (United States) Justin Marks	Porsche 3.6L Flat-6	33
31 DNF	GT	42	Team Sahlen	(United States) Joe Sahlen (United States) Will Nonnamaker	Chevrolet Corvette C6	20
31 DNF	GT	42	Team Sahlen	(United States) Joe Sahlen (United States) Will Nonnamaker	Chevrolet 5.7L V8	20
32 DNF	GT	71	Synergy Racing	(United States) Carey Grant (United States) Kevin Grant (United States) Milton Grant	Porsche 997 GT3 Cup	13
32 DNF	GT	71	Synergy Racing	(United States) Carey Grant (United States) Kevin Grant (United States) Milton Grant	Porsche 3.6L Flat-6	13
33 DNF	GT	69	SpeedSource	(United States) Emil Assentato (United States) Jeff Segal	Mazda RX-8 GT	5
33 DNF	GT	69	SpeedSource	(United States) Emil Assentato (United States) Jeff Segal	Mazda 2.0L 3-Rotor	5
34 DNF	DP	76	Krohn Racing	(Sweden) Nic Jönsson (Brazil) Ricardo Zonta	Proto-Auto Lola B08/70	1
34 DNF	DP	76	Krohn Racing	(Sweden) Nic Jönsson (Brazil) Ricardo Zonta	Ford 5.0L V8	1

Rolex Sports Car Series
Previous race: Rolex 24 at Daytona	2009 season	Next race: Verizon Wireless 250
