= Against Medical Advice =

Book by James Patterson

Against Medical Advice: A True Story
- Author: James Patterson, Hal Friedman
- Language: English
- Genre: Non-fiction
- Publisher: Little, Brown and Company
- Publication date: October 20, 2008
- Publication place: United States
- Media type: Print (Hardback & e-book)
- Pages: 368 pp (first edition, hardback)
- ISBN: 978-0-316-02504-1 (first edition, hardback)

Against Medical Advice: A True Story is a New York Times best-selling non-fiction book by James Patterson and Hal Friedman, detailing the illness and medical struggles of Cory Friedman and his family. The book was published on October 20, 2008, by Little, Brown and Company.

== Synopsis ==
Against Medical Advice begins with a seventeen-year-old Cory arriving at the Dressler Psychiatric Hospital for alcohol abuse, with him detailing the various medications he is on and how he feels that they do nothing for him. Cory expresses frustration over giving the appearance of being insane, despite his not feeling as if he was. The book shows how Cory began exhibiting uncontrollable urges to perform body tics and say various things at the age of five years. As he grew up, he was put through several different treatments, which contributed to his feelings of helplessness. Since he is unable to control his actions due to having OCD, Tourette syndrome, and an anxiety disorder, Cory experienced ridicule in his life and had troubles living the everyday life of a child, which is exacerbated by ill medical treatment.

== Med Head ==
In 2010, Cory Friedman published a young adult version of Against Medical Advice with Patterson, entitled Med Head: My Knock-Down Drag-Out Drugged-Up Battle with My Brain. The book was released on April 1, 2010, and received a positive review from TeenReads and Kirkus Reviews, who called it a "perfect prescription for misery-memoir maniacs".

== Reception ==
Diário Digital gave a positive review for Against Medical Advice, calling it "a touching story of courage, determination and the ultimate triumph of a family facing a desperate situation". The Carlsbad Current-Argus also praised the book, stating that it was a "success".
