= Kurt Kossmann =

American professional race car driver

Kurt Kossmann (born Kurt Arthur Kossmann on April 28, 1966) is an American professional race car driver who is known for being the first amputee to compete in the 24 Hours of Daytona. Kossmann is a cancer survivor who lost his left leg, above the knee, to an osteosarcoma in 1988. Kossmann underwent thirteen months of chemotherapy before making a full recovery. During his recovery, Kossmann designed a prosthetic leg specifically for operating the clutch system in a race car. This device allowed him to continue his racing career in the Barber Pro Series, Grand American Road Racing Championship, and eventually enter the 24 Hours of Daytona in 2009.

Kossmann has worked with various charities and organizations to raise awareness and donations for childhood cancer. Since overcoming his illness, Kurt has teamed with Paul Newman's Hole in the Wall Gang Camp and One Lap of America for fundraising events.

Kossmann was also the only amputee racer to ever compete in the BMW BoxerCup motorcycle series. He raced the American inauguration event at the Daytona International Speedway in 2003 during the annual Daytona Bike Week.
