= GAINSCO/Bob Stallings Racing =

American sports car racing team

- No.: No. 99 Daytona Prototype
- Base: Lewisville, Texas, USA
- Noted drivers: (United States) Alex Gurney (United States) Jon Fogarty (United States) Memo Gidley (United States) Darren Law (United States) Jimmy Vasser (Rolex 24 and other endurance races) (United States) Jimmie Johnson (Rolex 24 and other selected races) (Brazil) Cristiano da Matta (selected races)
- Races: 89
- Wins: 16
- Poles: 30
- Teams' Championships: 2
- Drivers' Championships: 2
- First entry: 2005 Road & Track 250
- Last entry: 2013 Porsche 250

GAINSCO/Bob Stallings Racing was an American sports car racing team based in Lewisville, Texas that competed in the Rolex Sports Car Series, United SportsCar Championship and Pirelli World Challenge. The team campaigns the No. 99 GAINSCO Auto Insurance Chevrolet-powered Riley, driven by Alex Gurney and Jon Fogarty. Primary sponsorship comes from car insurance company GAINSCO.

Initially, the team's owner and founder, SCCA Formula Atlantic national champion and GAINSCO executive Bob Stallings, drove No. 99. In 2006, with hopes of his team reaching its "championship potential", Stallings decided, two races into the season, to "step out of the cockpit", signing Jon Fogarty as his full-time replacement. Jimmy Vasser drives for the team in select endurance races, and Rocky Moran, Jr. has also driven No. 99.

At Mazda Raceway Laguna Seca in 2008, for the first time the team campaigned a second car, driven by Vasser and fellow Champ Car champion Cristiano da Matta, the latter making his first racing start since a critical injury in a 2006 testing crash.

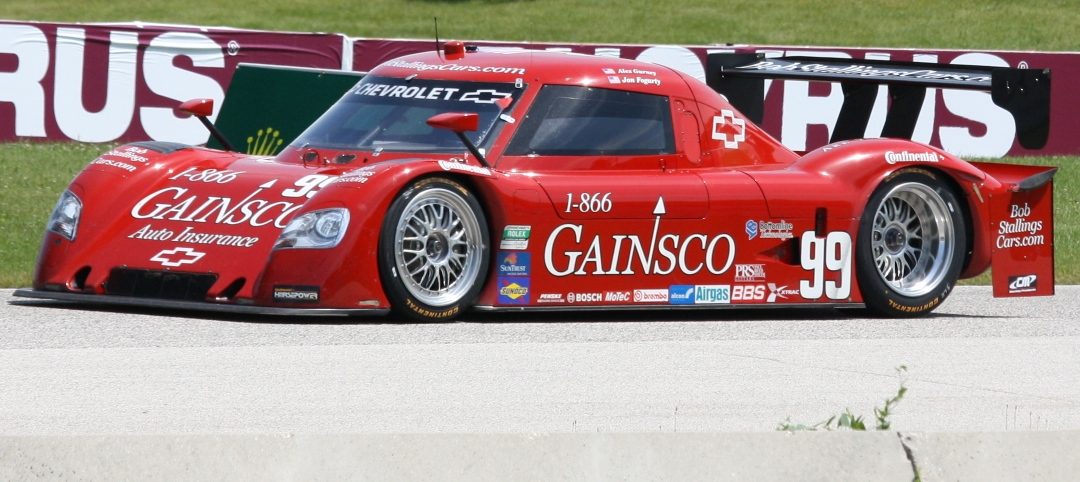
2011 Rolex Sports Car

In 2005 and 2006, the team was known as GAINSCO/Blackhawk Racing.

Prior to the 2010 season, the GAINSCO DP was powered by Pontiac. It has since been rebadged as Chevrolet.

== First victory and championship ==
In 2007, GAINSCO/Bob Stallings Racing won its first Rolex Sports Car Series race – the Mexico City 400k at the Autodromo Hermanos Rodriguez. This success would lead to six more wins to break the single season record of victories. This included a streak of three in a row broken at Iowa by Scott Pruett. Eventually, their victory at Sonoma gave them a one-point advantage over Pruett and three markers over Max Angelelli. In the Sunchaser 1000k season finale, Alex Gurney and Jon Fogarty rallied to finish eighth after a series of mishaps and claim GAINSCO/Bob Stallings Racing's first Rolex championship.
