= Emil Assentato =

American racing driver

Emil Assentato (born May 21, 1949) is an American racing driver born in New York City.

Assentato's career has seen him competing in the SCCA Formula Ford competition from 1973-1976 in local as well as National events. In that time, he had four podium finishes and won the 1974 New York Region Formula Ford class. After 19 years of reluctant retirement after a death defying accident at Lime Rock Park Labor Day 1976, interspersed with occasional go-karting events, he re-entered competition in 1995 in the Ferrari Challenge Series campaigning a Ferrari 348 Challenge for most of the 1995 and 1996 events in North America.

In 1996, Assentato compiled three wins and a second and third in five starts in that series. He debuted a Ford Mustang Cobra R in Motorola Cup competition in 1996 with teammate Nick Longhi and competed part-time with that car in the 1997 and 1998 seasons. Entered a full-time program with the same car in 2001 in Grand-Am Cup competition.

Assentato and Nick Longhi won their first major event in this series in November 2001 at the Daytona Finale and nearly won the GS II championship with it in 2002, losing that Championship chase by seven points because of a DNF in the final race. He also competed in the Rolex GT Series in 2000 with Spencer Pumpelly in five races in which their best finish was sixth. Competed in several Rolex races in 2001, 2002 and 2003, and campaigned full-time in 2004 (Maserati) and 2005 (Porsche 911 GT3 Cup).

Starting in 2008, Assentato joined the Mazda backed Speedsource Group competing in the #69 SpeedSource Mazda RX-8 in the Rolex Sports Car Series GT-class for the next five years. The team captured their first class win in the 6 hour race at Watkins Glen International with teammates Longhi and Jeff Segal.

Assentato with his teammate Jeff Segal captured the 2010 Rolex GT Class Championship in #69 Fxdd Mazda RX-8, winning three races as well as finishing in the top five at almost all the events. After one more season in the #69 Fxdd Mazda RX-8, both Jeff and Emil moved on to Ferrari 458 Italia Grand Am for the 2012 season.

In that historic 2012 season (as it marked the return of Ferrari to Grand Am competition after a ten-year hiatus), Assentato captured a second Rolex GT Class Championship with teammate Jeff Segal. Again winning three races and finishing in the top five positions in 90% of events.

In his last season, Assentato teamed up with Anthony Lazzaro in which they placed fourth in the Championship and proved to be a car to contend with at all events they competed in. After the last race, he decided to retire from competitive racing.

Below are listed some final results over the years.

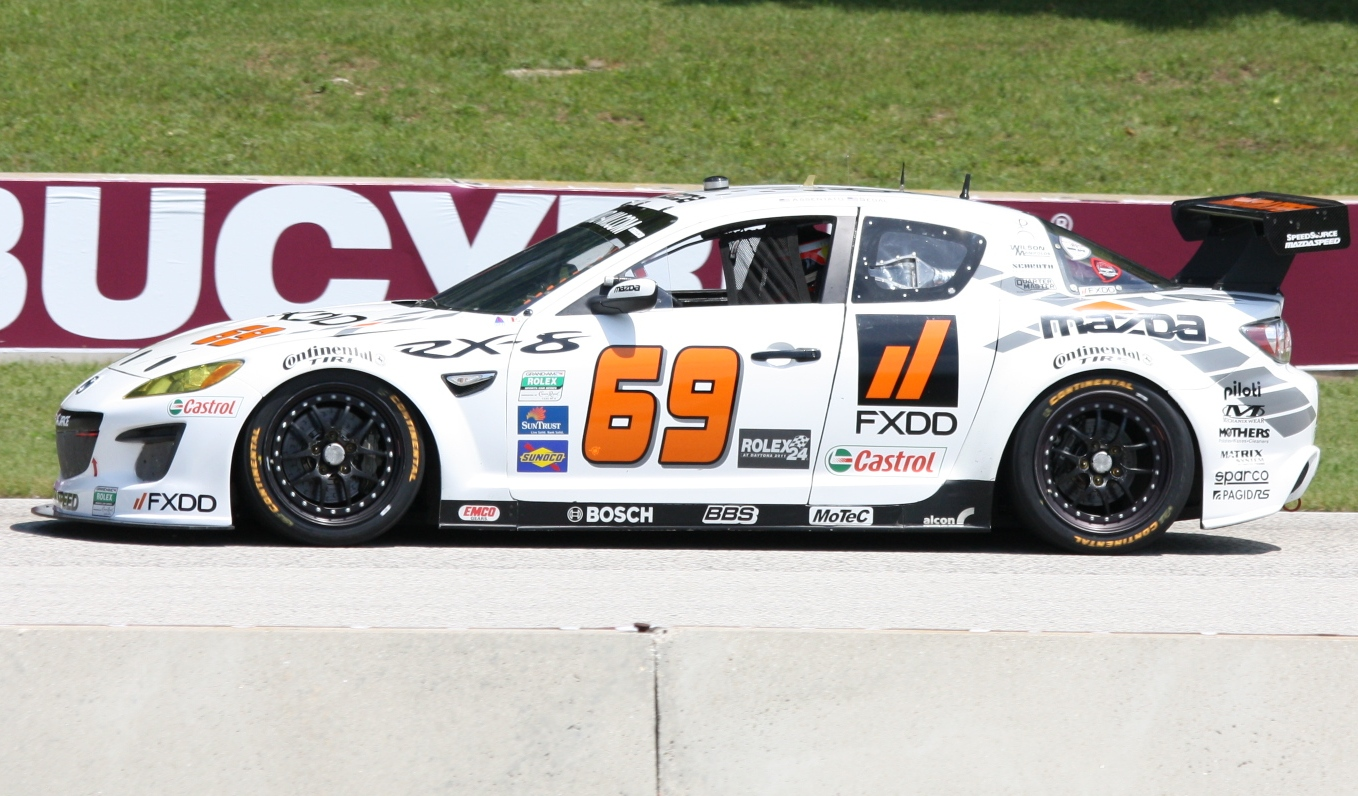
2011 Rolex Sports Car

Podium finishes in the Rolex GT Series included: 3rd in the 6 Hours of Watkins Glen, 2002: 3rd, Six hours of Mont Tremblant, 2004: 3rd, Virginia International Raceway, 2004; 2nd GT Class, Rolex 24 Hours of Daytona 2005. Competed in several events in the American Le Mans Series in a BMW M3 E46 in 2002. 2008 - Rolex GT Watkins Glen 6 Hour 1st place 2009 - Rolex GT Watkins Glen 2 Hour 1st place, Rolex GT Montreal 3rd place.
