= 2012 Rolex Sports Car Series =

13th season of the racing series organized by Grand-Am

Seasons
- ← 2011 2013 →

The 2012 Rolex Sports Car Series season was the thirteenth running of the Grand American Road Racing Association's premier series. It began with the 24 Hours of Daytona on January 28–29.

== Schedule ==
The schedule was announced on November 9, 2011. It consists of thirteen rounds. Twelve were announced that day. The final round at Lime Rock was announced November 14.

Rnd	Date	Race	Duration	Circuit	Location
1	January 28–29	Rolex 24 At Daytona	24 hours	Daytona International Speedway	Daytona Beach, Florida
2	March 31	Porsche 250	2 hours 45 minutes	Barber Motorsports Park	Birmingham, Alabama
3	April 29	Grand Prix of Miami	1 hour 55 minutes	Homestead-Miami Speedway	Homestead, Florida
4	May 13	Global Barter 250	2 hours 45 minutes	New Jersey Motorsports Park	Millville, New Jersey
5	June 2	Chevrolet Grand-Am Detroit 200	2 hours	The Raceway on Belle Isle	Detroit, Michigan
6	June 9	EMCO Gears Classic	2 hours 45 minutes	Mid-Ohio Sports Car Course	Lexington, Ohio
7	June 23	Rolex 250 Driven by VISITFLORIDA.COM	2 hours	Road America	Elkhart Lake, Wisconsin
8	July 1	Sahlen's Six Hours of The Glen	6 hours	Watkins Glen International	Watkins Glen, New York
9	July 27	Brickyard Grand Prix	3 hours	Indianapolis Motor Speedway (road course)	Speedway, Indiana
10	August 11	Continental Tire 200	2 hours	Watkins Glen International (short course)	Watkins Glen, New York
11	August 18	Montreal 200	2 hours	Circuit Gilles Villeneuve	Montreal, Quebec
12	September 9	Continental Tire Sports Car Festival	2 hours 45 minutes	Mazda Raceway Laguna Seca	Monterey, California
13	September 29	Championship Weekend	2 hours 45 minutes	Lime Rock Park	Lakeville, Connecticut

== Teams and drivers ==
Team	No	Drivers	Chassis Engine	Class	Rounds
Chip Ganassi Racing with Felix Sabates	01	(United States) Scott Pruett	Riley Mk. XX; BMW 5.0L V8	DP	All
Chip Ganassi Racing with Felix Sabates	01	(Mexico) Memo Rojas	Riley Mk. XX; BMW 5.0L V8	DP	All
Chip Ganassi Racing with Felix Sabates	01	(United States) Joey Hand	Riley Mk. XX; BMW 5.0L V8	DP	1
Chip Ganassi Racing with Felix Sabates	01	(United States) Graham Rahal	Riley Mk. XX; BMW 5.0L V8	DP	1
Chip Ganassi Racing with Felix Sabates	02	(New Zealand) Scott Dixon	Riley Mk. XX; BMW 5.0L V8	DP	1, 9
Chip Ganassi Racing with Felix Sabates	02	(United States) Jamie McMurray	Riley Mk. XX; BMW 5.0L V8	DP	1, 9
Chip Ganassi Racing with Felix Sabates	02	(Colombia) Juan Pablo Montoya	Riley Mk. XX; BMW 5.0L V8	DP	1, 9
Chip Ganassi Racing with Felix Sabates	02	(United Kingdom) Dario Franchitti	Riley Mk. XX; BMW 5.0L V8	DP	1
Extreme Speed Motorsports	03	(United States) Guy Cosmo	Ferrari 458 Italia; Ferrari 4.5L V8	GT	1, 3, 5, 8
Extreme Speed Motorsports	03	(United States) Johannes van Overbeek	Ferrari 458 Italia; Ferrari 4.5L V8	GT	1, 8, 12
Extreme Speed Motorsports	03	(United States) Ed Brown	Ferrari 458 Italia; Ferrari 4.5L V8	GT	1, 3
Extreme Speed Motorsports	03	(United States) Scott Sharp	Ferrari 458 Italia; Ferrari 4.5L V8	GT	1, 5
Extreme Speed Motorsports	03	(United States) Mike Hedlund	Ferrari 458 Italia; Ferrari 4.5L V8	GT	8, 12
Limitless Racing	08	(United States) Elivan Goulart	Audi R8 Grand-Am; Audi 5.2L V10	GT	4
Limitless Racing	08	(United States) Jason Lee	Audi R8 Grand-Am; Audi 5.2L V10	GT	4
Starworks Motorsport	2	(United States) Marco Andretti	Riley Mk. XX; Ford 5.0L V8	DP	1
Starworks Motorsport	2	(United States) Ryan Hunter-Reay	Riley Mk. XX; Ford 5.0L V8	DP	1
Starworks Motorsport	2	(United States) Scott Mayer	Riley Mk. XX; Ford 5.0L V8	DP	1
Starworks Motorsport	2	(Canada) Michael Valiante	Riley Mk. XX; Ford 5.0L V8	DP	1
Starworks Motorsport	2	(Venezuela) Alex Popow	Riley Mk. XX; Ford 5.0L V8	DP	2–12
Starworks Motorsport	2	(Germany) Lucas Luhr	Riley Mk. XX; Ford 5.0L V8	DP	2–8
Starworks Motorsport	2	(France) Sébastien Bourdais	Riley Mk. XX; Ford 5.0L V8	DP	9–10
Starworks Motorsport	2	(Canada) Alex Tagliani	Riley Mk. XX; Ford 5.0L V8	DP	11–12
Starworks Motorsport	2	(Mexico) Martin Fuentes	Riley Mk. XX; Ford 5.0L V8	DP	13
Starworks Motorsport	2	(Venezuela) Jorge Goncalvez	Riley Mk. XX; Ford 5.0L V8	DP	13
Starworks Motorsport	8	(United Kingdom) Ryan Dalziel	Riley Mk. XX; Ford 5.0L V8	DP	All
Starworks Motorsport	8	(Venezuela) Enzo Potolicchio	Riley Mk. XX; Ford 5.0L V8	DP	1–9
Starworks Motorsport	8	(Germany) Lucas Luhr	Riley Mk. XX; Ford 5.0L V8	DP	1, 10
Starworks Motorsport	8	(Venezuela) Alex Popow	Riley Mk. XX; Ford 5.0L V8	DP	1, 13
Starworks Motorsport	8	(United States) Allan McNish	Riley Mk. XX; Ford 5.0L V8	DP	1
Starworks Motorsport	8	(France) Sébastien Bourdais	Riley Mk. XX; Ford 5.0L V8	DP	8
Starworks Motorsport	8	(Canada) Alex Tagliani	Riley Mk. XX; Ford 5.0L V8	DP	11–12
Magnus Racing	4	(United Kingdom) Justin Bell	Porsche 997 GT3 Cup; Porsche 3.8L Flat-6	GT	1
Magnus Racing	4	(United States) Ryan Eversley	Porsche 997 GT3 Cup; Porsche 3.8L Flat-6	GT	1
Magnus Racing	4	(United States) Daniel Graeff	Porsche 997 GT3 Cup; Porsche 3.8L Flat-6	GT	1
Magnus Racing	4	(United States) Rob Yarab Jr.	Porsche 997 GT3 Cup; Porsche 3.8L Flat-6	GT	1
Magnus Racing	44	(United States) Andy Lally	Porsche 997 GT3 Cup; Porsche 3.8L Flat-6	GT	All
Magnus Racing	44	(United States) John Potter	Porsche 997 GT3 Cup; Porsche 3.8L Flat-6	GT	All
Magnus Racing	44	(Austria) Richard Lietz	Porsche 997 GT3 Cup; Porsche 3.8L Flat-6	GT	1
Magnus Racing	44	(Germany) René Rast	Porsche 997 GT3 Cup; Porsche 3.8L Flat-6	GT	1
Magnus Racing	44	(United States) Patrick Long	Porsche 997 GT3 Cup; Porsche 3.8L Flat-6	GT	8
Action Express Racing	5	(United States) David Donohue	Corvette DP (Coyote CPM); Chevrolet 5.0L V8	DP	All
Action Express Racing	5	(United States) Darren Law	Corvette DP (Coyote CPM); Chevrolet 5.0L V8	DP	1–4
Action Express Racing	5	(United States) Christian Fittipaldi	Corvette DP (Coyote CPM); Chevrolet 5.0L V8	DP	1
Action Express Racing	5	(United States) Terry Borcheller	Corvette DP (Coyote CPM); Chevrolet 5.0L V8	DP	5–13
Action Express Racing	5	(United States) Jordan Taylor	Corvette DP (Coyote CPM); Chevrolet 5.0L V8	DP	10
Action Express Racing	5	(Canada) Paul Tracy	Corvette DP (Coyote CPM); Chevrolet 5.0L V8	DP	11–12
Action Express Racing	5	(United States) Brian Frisselle	Corvette DP (Coyote CPM); Chevrolet 5.0L V8	DP	13
Action Express Racing	9	(Portugal) João Barbosa	Corvette DP (Coyote CPM); Chevrolet 5.0L V8	DP	All
Action Express Racing	9	(United States) J.C. France	Corvette DP (Coyote CPM); Chevrolet 5.0L V8	DP	1–7
Action Express Racing	9	(United States) Terry Borcheller	Corvette DP (Coyote CPM); Chevrolet 5.0L V8	DP	1–4
Action Express Racing	9	(Italy) Max Papis	Corvette DP (Coyote CPM); Chevrolet 5.0L V8	DP	1
Action Express Racing	9	(United States) Darren Law	Corvette DP (Coyote CPM); Chevrolet 5.0L V8	DP	5–13
Michael Shank Racing with Curb–Agajanian	6	(Venezuela) Jorge Goncalvez	Riley Mk. XX; Ford 5.0L V8	DP	1
Michael Shank Racing with Curb–Agajanian	6	(United States) Michael McDowell	Riley Mk. XX; Ford 5.0L V8	DP	1
Michael Shank Racing with Curb–Agajanian	6	(Brazil) Felipe Nasr	Riley Mk. XX; Ford 5.0L V8	DP	1
Michael Shank Racing with Curb–Agajanian	6	(Colombia) Gustavo Yacamán	Riley Mk. XX; Ford 5.0L V8	DP	1
Michael Shank Racing with Curb–Agajanian	60	(Brazil) Oswaldo Negri Jr.	Riley Mk. XX; Ford 5.0L V8	DP	All
Michael Shank Racing with Curb–Agajanian	60	(United States) John Pew	Riley Mk. XX; Ford 5.0L V8	DP	All
Michael Shank Racing with Curb–Agajanian	60	(United States) A. J. Allmendinger	Riley Mk. XX; Ford 5.0L V8	DP	1
Michael Shank Racing with Curb–Agajanian	60	(United Kingdom) Justin Wilson	Riley Mk. XX; Ford 5.0L V8	DP	1
SunTrust Racing	10	(Italy) Max Angelelli	Corvette DP (Dallara DP01); Chevrolet 5.0L V8	DP	All
SunTrust Racing	10	(United States) Ricky Taylor	Corvette DP (Dallara DP01); Chevrolet 5.0L V8	DP	All
SunTrust Racing	10	(Australia) Ryan Briscoe	Corvette DP (Dallara DP01); Chevrolet 5.0L V8	DP	1
Alliance Autosport	12	(United States) Jon Miller	Porsche 997 GT3 Cup; Porsche 3.8L Flat-6	GT	1
Alliance Autosport	12	(United States) Hal Prewitt	Porsche 997 GT3 Cup; Porsche 3.8L Flat-6	GT	1
Alliance Autosport	12	(United States) Scott Rettich	Porsche 997 GT3 Cup; Porsche 3.8L Flat-6	GT	1
Alliance Autosport	12	(United States) Matt Schneider	Porsche 997 GT3 Cup; Porsche 3.8L Flat-6	GT	1
Alliance Autosport	12	(United States) Daryl Shoff	Porsche 997 GT3 Cup; Porsche 3.8L Flat-6	GT	1
Rick Ware Racing	15	(United States) Chris Cook	Ford Mustang; Ford 5.0L V8	GT	1–2
Rick Ware Racing	15	(United States) Jeffrey Earnhardt	Ford Mustang; Ford 5.0L V8	GT	1–2
Rick Ware Racing	15	(United States) Timmy Hill	Ford Mustang; Ford 5.0L V8	GT	1, 7
Rick Ware Racing	15	(United States) John Ware Jr.	Ford Mustang; Ford 5.0L V8	GT	1, 7
Rick Ware Racing	15	(United States) Doug Harrington	Ford Mustang; Ford 5.0L V8	GT	1
Rick Ware Racing	15	(United States) Kevin O'Connell	Ford Mustang; Ford 5.0L V8	GT	7, 9
Rick Ware Racing	15	(United States) Jason White	Ford Mustang; Ford 5.0L V8	GT	9
Burtin Racing with Goldcrest Motorsports	17	(Argentina) Claudio Burtin	Porsche 997 GT3 Cup; Porsche 3.8L Flat-6	GT	1, 8–9
Burtin Racing with Goldcrest Motorsports	17	(Austria) Martin Ragginger	Porsche 997 GT3 Cup; Porsche 3.8L Flat-6	GT	1, 8–9
Burtin Racing with Goldcrest Motorsports	17	(Germany) Sebastian Asch	Porsche 997 GT3 Cup; Porsche 3.8L Flat-6	GT	1
Burtin Racing with Goldcrest Motorsports	17	(United States) Jack Baldwin	Porsche 997 GT3 Cup; Porsche 3.8L Flat-6	GT	1
Burtin Racing with Goldcrest Motorsports	17	(United States) Bryan Sellers	Porsche 997 GT3 Cup; Porsche 3.8L Flat-6	GT	1
Mühlner Motorsports America	18	(United States) Davy Jones	Porsche 997 GT3 Cup; Porsche 3.8L Flat-6	GT	1
Mühlner Motorsports America	18	(United States) Bill Lester	Porsche 997 GT3 Cup; Porsche 3.8L Flat-6	GT	1
Mühlner Motorsports America	18	(United States) John McCutchen	Porsche 997 GT3 Cup; Porsche 3.8L Flat-6	GT	1
Mühlner Motorsports America	18	(Canada) Mark Thomas	Porsche 997 GT3 Cup; Porsche 3.8L Flat-6	GT	1
Mühlner Motorsports America	19	(United States) Scott Dollahite	Porsche 997 GT3 Cup; Porsche 3.8L Flat-6	GT	1
Mühlner Motorsports America	19	(United States) Ian Nater	Porsche 997 GT3 Cup; Porsche 3.8L Flat-6	GT	1
Mühlner Motorsports America	19	(United States) Rhett O'Doski	Porsche 997 GT3 Cup; Porsche 3.8L Flat-6	GT	1
Mühlner Motorsports America	19	(Germany) Marco Seefried	Porsche 997 GT3 Cup; Porsche 3.8L Flat-6	GT	1
Mühlner Motorsports America	19	(United States) Derek Whitis	Porsche 997 GT3 Cup; Porsche 3.8L Flat-6	GT	1
Liqui Moly Team Engstler/ Mitchum Motorsports	20	(United States) Jade Buford	Porsche 997 GT3 Cup; Porsche 3.8L Flat-6	GT	1
Liqui Moly Team Engstler/ Mitchum Motorsports	20	(Germany) Franz Engstler	Porsche 997 GT3 Cup; Porsche 3.8L Flat-6	GT	1
Liqui Moly Team Engstler/ Mitchum Motorsports	20	(United States) David Murry	Porsche 997 GT3 Cup; Porsche 3.8L Flat-6	GT	1
Liqui Moly Team Engstler/ Mitchum Motorsports	20	(United States) Gunter Schaldach	Porsche 997 GT3 Cup; Porsche 3.8L Flat-6	GT	1
M2 Autosport	21	(Colombia) Sebastian Martinez	Mazda RX-8; Mazda 2.0L 3-Rotor	GT	3
M2 Autosport	21	(Colombia) Julien Martinez	Mazda RX-8; Mazda 2.0L 3-Rotor	GT	3
M2 Autosport	21	(Colombia) Mario Monroy	Mazda RX-8; Mazda 2.0L 3-Rotor	GT	3
Bullet Racing	22	(United States) Randy Blaylock	Porsche 997 GT3 Cup; Porsche 3.8L Flat-6	GT	1
Bullet Racing	22	(Hong Kong) Darryl O'Young	Porsche 997 GT3 Cup; Porsche 3.8L Flat-6	GT	1
Bullet Racing	22	(United States) Kevin Roush	Porsche 997 GT3 Cup; Porsche 3.8L Flat-6	GT	1
Bullet Racing	22	(Canada) Brett Van Blankers	Porsche 997 GT3 Cup; Porsche 3.8L Flat-6	GT	1
Bullet Racing	22	(United States) Joe White	Porsche 997 GT3 Cup; Porsche 3.8L Flat-6	GT	1
Alex Job Racing	23	(France) Emmanuel Collard	Porsche 997 GT3 Cup; Porsche 3.8L Flat-6	GT	1
Alex Job Racing	23	(Germany) Marco Holzer	Porsche 997 GT3 Cup; Porsche 3.8L Flat-6	GT	1
Alex Job Racing	23	(United States) Butch Leitzinger	Porsche 997 GT3 Cup; Porsche 3.8L Flat-6	GT	1
Alex Job Racing	23	(United States) Cooper MacNeil	Porsche 997 GT3 Cup; Porsche 3.8L Flat-6	GT	1
Alex Job Racing	24	(United States) Michael Avenatti	Porsche 997 GT3 Cup; Porsche 3.8L Flat-6	GT	1
Alex Job Racing	24	(United States) Bob Faieta	Porsche 997 GT3 Cup; Porsche 3.8L Flat-6	GT	1
Alex Job Racing	24	(United States) Fred Poordad	Porsche 997 GT3 Cup; Porsche 3.8L Flat-6	GT	1
Alex Job Racing	24	(United States) Bill Sweedler	Porsche 997 GT3 Cup; Porsche 3.8L Flat-6	GT	1
Alex Job Racing	24	(United States) Cort Wagner	Porsche 997 GT3 Cup; Porsche 3.8L Flat-6	GT	1
NGT Motorsport	26	(Venezuela) Henrique Cisneros	Porsche 997 GT3 Cup; Porsche 3.8L Flat-6	GT	1
NGT Motorsport	26	(United Kingdom) Sean Edwards	Porsche 997 GT3 Cup; Porsche 3.8L Flat-6	GT	1
NGT Motorsport	26	(United States) Carlos Kauffmann	Porsche 997 GT3 Cup; Porsche 3.8L Flat-6	GT	1
NGT Motorsport	26	(United Kingdom) Nick Tandy	Porsche 997 GT3 Cup; Porsche 3.8L Flat-6	GT	1
Marsh Racing	31	(United States) Eric Curran	Chevrolet Corvette; Chevrolet 6.2L V8	GT	2–13
Marsh Racing	31	(United States) Boris Said	Chevrolet Corvette; Chevrolet 6.2L V8	GT	2–6, 8–13
Marsh Racing	31	(United States) John Heinricy	Chevrolet Corvette; Chevrolet 6.2L V8	GT	7
Marsh Racing	31	(United States) Lawson Aschenbach	Chevrolet Corvette; Chevrolet 6.2L V8	GT	8
Orbit Racing/GMG	32	(France) Nicolas Armindo	Porsche 997 GT3 Cup; Porsche 3.8L Flat-6	GT	1
Orbit Racing/GMG	32	(United States) Bret Curtis	Porsche 997 GT3 Cup; Porsche 3.8L Flat-6	GT	1
Orbit Racing/GMG	32	(United States) Shane Lewis	Porsche 997 GT3 Cup; Porsche 3.8L Flat-6	GT	1
Orbit Racing/GMG	32	(United States) James Sofronas	Porsche 997 GT3 Cup; Porsche 3.8L Flat-6	GT	1
Orbit Racing/GMG	32	(United States) Lance Willsey	Porsche 997 GT3 Cup; Porsche 3.8L Flat-6	GT	1
Orbit Racing/GMG	34	(United States) Michael DeFontes	Porsche 997 GT3 Cup; Porsche 3.8L Flat-6	GT	1
Orbit Racing/GMG	34	(United States) Phil Fogg	Porsche 997 GT3 Cup; Porsche 3.8L Flat-6	GT	1
Orbit Racing/GMG	34	(Slovakia) Miroslav Konopka	Porsche 997 GT3 Cup; Porsche 3.8L Flat-6	GT	1
Orbit Racing/GMG	34	(Czech Republic) Jan Vonka	Porsche 997 GT3 Cup; Porsche 3.8L Flat-6	GT	1
Orbit Racing/GMG	34	(Netherlands) Ronald van de Laar	Porsche 997 GT3 Cup; Porsche 3.8L Flat-6	GT	1
Yellow Dragon Motorsports	36	(United States) Jarett Andretti	Mazda RX-8; Mazda 2.0L 3-Rotor	GT	1
Yellow Dragon Motorsports	36	(United States) John Andretti	Mazda RX-8; Mazda 2.0L 3-Rotor	GT	1
Yellow Dragon Motorsports	36	(Canada) Taylor Hacquard	Mazda RX-8; Mazda 2.0L 3-Rotor	GT	1
Yellow Dragon Motorsports	36	(Norway) Anders Krohn	Mazda RX-8; Mazda 2.0L 3-Rotor	GT	1
Dempsey Racing	40	(United States) Joe Foster	Mazda RX-8; Mazda 2.0L 3-Rotor	GT	1–10, 12–13
Dempsey Racing	40	(United States) Patrick Dempsey	Mazda RX-8; Mazda 2.0L 3-Rotor	GT	1–3, 5–9, 12
Dempsey Racing	40	(United States) Tom Long	Mazda RX-8; Mazda 2.0L 3-Rotor	GT	1, 3–4, 8–11, 13
Dempsey Racing	40	(United States) Charles Espenlaub	Mazda RX-8; Mazda 2.0L 3-Rotor	GT	1
Dempsey Racing	40	(United States) Charles Putnam	Mazda RX-8; Mazda 2.0L 3-Rotor	GT	1
Dempsey Racing	40	(Canada) Scott Maxwell	Mazda RX-8; Mazda 2.0L 3-Rotor	GT	4, 11
Dempsey Racing	41	(Canada) Scott Maxwell	Mazda RX-8; Mazda 2.0L 3-Rotor	GT	1, 8
Dempsey Racing	41	(United Kingdom) Ian James	Mazda RX-8; Mazda 2.0L 3-Rotor	GT	1
Dempsey Racing	41	(United States) Rick Johnson	Mazda RX-8; Mazda 2.0L 3-Rotor	GT	1
Dempsey Racing	41	(United States) Don Kitch Jr.	Mazda RX-8; Mazda 2.0L 3-Rotor	GT	1
Dempsey Racing	41	(United States) Dan Rogers	Mazda RX-8; Mazda 2.0L 3-Rotor	GT	1
Dempsey Racing	41	(United States) Charles Espenlaub	Mazda RX-8; Mazda 2.0L 3-Rotor	GT	2–13
Dempsey Racing	41	(United States) Charles Putman	Mazda RX-8; Mazda 2.0L 3-Rotor	GT	2–13
Team Sahlen	42	(United States) Wayne Nonnamaker	Mazda RX-8; Mazda 2.0L 3-Rotor	GT	1–8, 10, 12–13
Team Sahlen	42	(United States) Dane Cameron	Mazda RX-8; Mazda 2.0L 3-Rotor	GT	1–9
Team Sahlen	42	(United States) Joe Nonnamaker	Mazda RX-8; Mazda 2.0L 3-Rotor	GT	1, 9–12
Team Sahlen	42	(United States) Will Nonnamaker	Mazda RX-8; Mazda 2.0L 3-Rotor	GT	1, 8–9, 11, 13
Team Sahlen	42	(United States) Joe Sahlen	Mazda RX-8; Mazda 2.0L 3-Rotor	GT	12
Team Sahlen	43	(United States) Wayne Nonnamaker	Mazda RX-8; Mazda 2.0L 3-Rotor	GT	1–2, 5–6, 9–13
Team Sahlen	43	(United States) Joe Nonnamaker	Mazda RX-8; Mazda 2.0L 3-Rotor	GT	1–8
Team Sahlen	43	(United States) Will Nonnamaker	Mazda RX-8; Mazda 2.0L 3-Rotor	GT	1, 3–5, 7–9
Team Sahlen	43	(United States) Dane Cameron	Mazda RX-8; Mazda 2.0L 3-Rotor	GT	8–13
Team Sahlen	43	(United States) Joe Sahlen	Mazda RX-8; Mazda 2.0L 3-Rotor	GT	8
Team Sahlen	49	(United States) Will Nonnamaker	Mazda RX-8; Mazda 2.0L 3-Rotor	GT	2, 6, 10, 12
Team Sahlen	49	(United States) Joe Sahlen	Mazda RX-8; Mazda 2.0L 3-Rotor	GT	2, 6, 10, 12
Flying Lizard Motorsports with Wright Motorsports	45	(Germany) Jörg Bergmeister	Porsche 997 GT3 Cup; Porsche 3.8L Flat-6	GT	1
Flying Lizard Motorsports with Wright Motorsports	45	(United States) Patrick Long	Porsche 997 GT3 Cup; Porsche 3.8L Flat-6	GT	1
Flying Lizard Motorsports with Wright Motorsports	45	(United States) Seth Neiman	Porsche 997 GT3 Cup; Porsche 3.8L Flat-6	GT	1
Flying Lizard Motorsports with Wright Motorsports	45	(Germany) Mike Rockenfeller	Porsche 997 GT3 Cup; Porsche 3.8L Flat-6	GT	1
Michael Baughman Racing	46	(United States) Michael Baughman	Chevrolet Corvette; Chevrolet 6.2L V8	GT	1, 5, 9–10
Michael Baughman Racing	46	(United States) Jeff Nowicki	Chevrolet Corvette; Chevrolet 6.2L V8	GT	1, 5
Michael Baughman Racing	46	(Netherlands) Ivo Breukers	Chevrolet Corvette; Chevrolet 6.2L V8	GT	1
Michael Baughman Racing	46	(Belgium) Armand Fumal	Chevrolet Corvette; Chevrolet 6.2L V8	GT	1
Michael Baughman Racing	46	(United States) Ray Mason	Chevrolet Corvette; Chevrolet 6.2L V8	GT	1
Michael Baughman Racing	46	(United States) James Davison	Chevrolet Corvette; Chevrolet 6.2L V8	GT	9–10
Michael Baughman Racing	46	(Colombia) Sebastián Saavedra	Chevrolet Corvette; Chevrolet 6.2L V8	GT	9
Paul Miller Racing	48	(United Kingdom) Rob Bell	Porsche 997 GT3 Cup; Porsche 3.8L Flat-6	GT	1
Paul Miller Racing	48	(Germany) Sascha Maassen	Porsche 997 GT3 Cup; Porsche 3.8L Flat-6	GT	1
Paul Miller Racing	48	(United States) Bryce Miller	Porsche 997 GT3 Cup; Porsche 3.8L Flat-6	GT	1
Paul Miller Racing	48	(Canada) Mark Wilkins	Porsche 997 GT3 Cup; Porsche 3.8L Flat-6	GT	1
Predator Performance/ 50+ Racing	50	(United States) Byron DeFloor	Riley Mk. XI; BMW 5.0L V8	DP	1
Predator Performance/ 50+ Racing	50	(United States) Elliott Forbes-Robinson	Riley Mk. XI; BMW 5.0L V8	DP	1
Predator Performance/ 50+ Racing	50	(United Kingdom) Brian Johnson	Riley Mk. XI; BMW 5.0L V8	DP	1
Predator Performance/ 50+ Racing	50	(United States) Jim Pace	Riley Mk. XI; BMW 5.0L V8	DP	1
Predator Performance/ 50+ Racing	50	(United States) Carlos de Quesada	Riley Mk. XI; BMW 5.0L V8	DP	1
APR Motorsport	51	(South Africa) Dion von Moltke	Audi R8 Grand-Am; Audi 5.2L V10	GT	All
APR Motorsport	51	(United States) Jim Norman	Audi R8 Grand-Am; Audi 5.2L V10	GT	All
APR Motorsport	51	(United States) Ian Baas	Audi R8 Grand-Am; Audi 5.2L V10	GT	1, 3, 8
APR Motorsport	51	(Venezuela) Nelson Canache Jr.	Audi R8 Grand-Am; Audi 5.2L V10	GT	1
APR Motorsport	51	(Italy) Emanuele Pirro	Audi R8 Grand-Am; Audi 5.2L V10	GT	1
APR Motorsport	52	(Germany) Marc Basseng	Audi R8 Grand-Am; Audi 5.2L V10	GT	8
APR Motorsport	52	(Germany) Frank Stippler	Audi R8 Grand-Am; Audi 5.2L V10	GT	8
Acumen Motorsport	55	(United States) Frank Del Vecchio	Porsche 997 GT3 Cup; Porsche 3.8L Flat-6	GT	1
Acumen Motorsport	55	(United States) Doug Grunnet	Porsche 997 GT3 Cup; Porsche 3.8L Flat-6	GT	1
Acumen Motorsport	55	(United States) Tony Kester	Porsche 997 GT3 Cup; Porsche 3.8L Flat-6	GT	1
Acumen Motorsport	55	(United States) Scott McKee	Porsche 997 GT3 Cup; Porsche 3.8L Flat-6	GT	1
Acumen Motorsport	55	(United States) Randy Pobst	Porsche 997 GT3 Cup; Porsche 3.8L Flat-6	GT	1
AF–Waltrip	56	(Portugal) Rui Águas	Ferrari 458 Italia; Ferrari 4.5L V8	GT	1, 8–10
AF–Waltrip	56	(United States) Rob Kauffman	Ferrari 458 Italia; Ferrari 4.5L V8	GT	1, 8–10
AF–Waltrip	56	(United States) Travis Pastrana	Ferrari 458 Italia; Ferrari 4.5L V8	GT	1
AF–Waltrip	56	(United States) Michael Waltrip	Ferrari 458 Italia; Ferrari 4.5L V8	GT	1
Stevenson Motorsports	57	(United Kingdom) Robin Liddell	Chevrolet Camaro GT.R; Chevrolet 6.0L V8	GT	All
Stevenson Motorsports	57	(United States) John Edwards	Chevrolet Camaro GT.R; Chevrolet 6.0L V8	GT	1, 3–13
Stevenson Motorsports	57	(Denmark) Ronnie Bremer	Chevrolet Camaro GT.R; Chevrolet 6.0L V8	GT	1–2
Stevenson Motorsports	75	(United States) Matt Bell	Chevrolet Camaro GT.R; Chevrolet 6.0L V8	GT	1, 8–9
Stevenson Motorsports	75	(United States) Al Carter	Chevrolet Camaro GT.R; Chevrolet 6.0L V8	GT	1
Stevenson Motorsports	75	(United States) Eric Curran	Chevrolet Camaro GT.R; Chevrolet 6.0L V8	GT	1
Stevenson Motorsports	75	(United States) Hugh Plumb	Chevrolet Camaro GT.R; Chevrolet 6.0L V8	GT	1
Stevenson Motorsports	75	(Denmark) Ronnie Bremer	Chevrolet Camaro GT.R; Chevrolet 6.0L V8	GT	8–9
Stevenson Motorsports	75	(United States) Jordan Taylor	Chevrolet Camaro GT.R; Chevrolet 6.0L V8	GT	8
Brumos Racing	59	(United States) Andrew Davis	Porsche 997 GT3 Cup; Porsche 3.8L Flat-6	GT	All
Brumos Racing	59	(United States) Leh Keen	Porsche 997 GT3 Cup; Porsche 3.8L Flat-6	GT	All
Brumos Racing	59	(United States) Hurley Haywood	Porsche 997 GT3 Cup; Porsche 3.8L Flat-6	GT	1
Brumos Racing	59	(Germany) Marc Lieb	Porsche 997 GT3 Cup; Porsche 3.8L Flat-6	GT	1
Risi Competizione	62	(Italy) Gianmaria Bruni	Ferrari 458 Italia; Ferrari 4.5L V8	GT	1
Risi Competizione	62	(Italy) Giancarlo Fisichella	Ferrari 458 Italia; Ferrari 4.5L V8	GT	1
Risi Competizione	62	(Brazil) Raphael Matos	Ferrari 458 Italia; Ferrari 4.5L V8	GT	1
Risi Competizione	63	(Monaco) Olivier Beretta	Ferrari 458 Italia; Ferrari 4.5L V8	GT	1, 12
Risi Competizione	63	(Italy) Andrea Bertolini	Ferrari 458 Italia; Ferrari 4.5L V8	GT	1
Risi Competizione	63	(Finland) Toni Vilander	Ferrari 458 Italia; Ferrari 4.5L V8	GT	1
Risi Competizione	63	(Italy) Alessandro Balzan	Ferrari 458 Italia; Ferrari 4.5L V8	GT	12–13
Risi Competizione	63	(United States) Johannes van Overbeek	Ferrari 458 Italia; Ferrari 4.5L V8	GT	13
The Racer's Group	64	(Chile) Eduardo Costabal	Porsche 997 GT3 Cup; Porsche 3.8L Flat-6	GT	1, 8–9
The Racer's Group	64	(Chile) Eliseo Salazar	Porsche 997 GT3 Cup; Porsche 3.8L Flat-6	GT	1, 8–9
The Racer's Group	64	(Colombia) Santiago Orjuela	Porsche 997 GT3 Cup; Porsche 3.8L Flat-6	GT	1, 8
The Racer's Group	64	(Venezuela) Gaetano Ardagna	Porsche 997 GT3 Cup; Porsche 3.8L Flat-6	GT	1
The Racer's Group	64	(Venezuela) Emilio Di Guida	Porsche 997 GT3 Cup; Porsche 3.8L Flat-6	GT	1
The Racer's Group	65	(Italy) Joe Castellano	Porsche 997 GT3 Cup; Porsche 3.8L Flat-6	GT	1
The Racer's Group	65	(United States) Spencer Cox	Porsche 997 GT3 Cup; Porsche 3.8L Flat-6	GT	1
The Racer's Group	65	(United States) Mike Hedlund	Porsche 997 GT3 Cup; Porsche 3.8L Flat-6	GT	1
The Racer's Group	65	(United States) Jack McCarthy	Porsche 997 GT3 Cup; Porsche 3.8L Flat-6	GT	1
The Racer's Group	65	(United States) Jim Michaelian	Porsche 997 GT3 Cup; Porsche 3.8L Flat-6	GT	1
The Racer's Group	66	(United States) Ben Keating	Porsche 997 GT3 Cup; Porsche 3.8L Flat-6	GT	1, 8–9
The Racer's Group	66	(Germany) Dominik Farnbacher	Porsche 997 GT3 Cup; Porsche 3.8L Flat-6	GT	1
The Racer's Group	66	(France) Patrick Pilet	Porsche 997 GT3 Cup; Porsche 3.8L Flat-6	GT	1
The Racer's Group	66	(Denmark) Allan Simonsen	Porsche 997 GT3 Cup; Porsche 3.8L Flat-6	GT	1
The Racer's Group	66	(Republic of Ireland) Damien Faulkner	Porsche 997 GT3 Cup; Porsche 3.8L Flat-6	GT	8
The Racer's Group	66	(United States) Bryan Sellers	Porsche 997 GT3 Cup; Porsche 3.8L Flat-6	GT	8
The Racer's Group	66	(Germany) Jörg Bergmeister	Porsche 997 GT3 Cup; Porsche 3.8L Flat-6	GT	9
The Racer's Group	66	(United States) Bob Doyle	Porsche 997 GT3 Cup; Porsche 3.8L Flat-6	GT	13
The Racer's Group	66	(United States) Spencer Pumpelly	Porsche 997 GT3 Cup; Porsche 3.8L Flat-6	GT	13
The Racer's Group	67	(United States) Spencer Pumpelly	Porsche 997 GT3 Cup; Porsche 3.8L Flat-6	GT	1–8
The Racer's Group	67	(United States) Steven Bertheau	Porsche 997 GT3 Cup; Porsche 3.8L Flat-6	GT	1–7
The Racer's Group	67	(Germany) Wolf Henzler	Porsche 997 GT3 Cup; Porsche 3.8L Flat-6	GT	1, 8
The Racer's Group	67	(Belgium) Marc Goossens	Porsche 997 GT3 Cup; Porsche 3.8L Flat-6	GT	1
The Racer's Group	67	(Netherlands) Jeroen Bleekemolen	Porsche 997 GT3 Cup; Porsche 3.8L Flat-6	GT	1
The Racer's Group	67	(United States) Al Carter	Porsche 997 GT3 Cup; Porsche 3.8L Flat-6	GT	8
The Racer's Group	68	(Canada) Chris Cumming	Porsche 997 GT3 Cup; Porsche 3.8L Flat-6	GT	1
The Racer's Group	68	(France) Kévin Estre	Porsche 997 GT3 Cup; Porsche 3.8L Flat-6	GT	1
The Racer's Group	68	(Republic of Ireland) Damien Faulkner	Porsche 997 GT3 Cup; Porsche 3.8L Flat-6	GT	1
The Racer's Group	68	(Colombia) Carlos Gómez	Porsche 997 GT3 Cup; Porsche 3.8L Flat-6	GT	1
The Racer's Group	68	(United States) Ben Keating	Porsche 997 GT3 Cup; Porsche 3.8L Flat-6	GT	1
The Racer's Group	68	(Netherlands) Jeroen Bleekemolen	Porsche 997 GT3 Cup; Porsche 3.8L Flat-6	GT	2–3
The Racer's Group	68	(Venezuela) Emilio De Guida	Porsche 997 GT3 Cup; Porsche 3.8L Flat-6	GT	2–3
AIM Autosport/ Team FXDD Racing with Ferrari	69	(United States) Emil Assentato	Ferrari 458 Italia; Ferrari 4.5L V8	GT	All
AIM Autosport/ Team FXDD Racing with Ferrari	69	(United States) Jeff Segal	Ferrari 458 Italia; Ferrari 4.5L V8	GT	All
AIM Autosport/ Team FXDD Racing with Ferrari	69	(United States) Anthony Lazzaro	Ferrari 458 Italia; Ferrari 4.5L V8	GT	1, 8
AIM Autosport/ Team FXDD Racing with Ferrari	69	(United States) Nick Longhi	Ferrari 458 Italia; Ferrari 4.5L V8	GT	
SpeedSource	70	(United States) Jonathan Bomartio	Mazda RX-8; Mazda 2.0L 3-Rotor	GT	All
SpeedSource	70	(Canada) Sylvain Tremblay	Mazda RX-8; Mazda 2.0L 3-Rotor	GT	All
SpeedSource	70	(United Kingdom) Marino Franchitti	Mazda RX-8; Mazda 2.0L 3-Rotor	GT	1
SpeedSource	70	(Canada) James Hinchcliffe	Mazda RX-8; Mazda 2.0L 3-Rotor	GT	1
Grant Racing	72	(United States) Carey Grant	Porsche 997 GT3 Cup; Porsche 3.8L Flat-6	GT	6, 9
Grant Racing	72	(United States) Kevin Grant	Porsche 997 GT3 Cup; Porsche 3.8L Flat-6	GT	6, 9
Grant Racing	72	(United States) Milton Grant	Porsche 997 GT3 Cup; Porsche 3.8L Flat-6	GT	6, 9
Grant Racing	72	(United States) Brady Refenning	Porsche 997 GT3 Cup; Porsche 3.8L Flat-6	GT	9
Horton Autosport	73	(United States) Eric Foss	Porsche 997 GT3 Cup; Porsche 3.8L Flat-6	GT	2–10, 12–13
Horton Autosport	73	(United States) Patrick Lindsey	Porsche 997 GT3 Cup; Porsche 3.8L Flat-6	GT	2–10, 12–13
Horton Autosport	73	(United States) Ryan Eversley	Porsche 997 GT3 Cup; Porsche 3.8L Flat-6	GT	8
Horton Autosport	73	(United States) Jason Hart	Porsche 997 GT3 Cup; Porsche 3.8L Flat-6	GT	13
Oryx Racing	74	(United Arab Emirates) Humaid Al Masaood	Audi R8 Grand-Am; Audi 5.2L V10	GT	1–2
Oryx Racing	74	(United Kingdom) Steven Kane	Audi R8 Grand-Am; Audi 5.2L V10	GT	1–2
Oryx Racing	74	(United Arab Emirates) Saeed Al Mehairi	Audi R8 Grand-Am; Audi 5.2L V10	GT	1
Krohn Racing	76	(United States) Colin Braun	Lola B08/70; Ford 5.0L V8	DP	1
Krohn Racing	76	(Sweden) Niclas Jönsson	Lola B08/70; Ford 5.0L V8	DP	1
Krohn Racing	76	(United States) Tracy Krohn	Lola B08/70; Ford 5.0L V8	DP	1
Krohn Racing	76	(Brazil) Ricardo Zonta	Lola B08/70; Ford 5.0L V8	DP	1
Doran Racing	77	(United States) Jim Lowe	Dallara DP–01; Ford 5.0L V8	DP	1, 4, 8–9
Doran Racing	77	(Canada) Paul Tracy	Dallara DP–01; Ford 5.0L V8	DP	1, 4, 8–9
Doran Racing	77	(United States) Brian Frisselle	Dallara DP–01; Ford 5.0L V8	DP	1, 8
Doran Racing	77	(United States) Burt Frisselle	Dallara DP–01; Ford 5.0L V8	DP	1
Doran Racing	77	(United States) Billy Johnson	Dallara DP–01; Ford 5.0L V8	DP	1
Dick Greer Racing	82	(United States) John Fergus	Porsche 997 GT3 Cup; Porsche 3.8L Flat-6	GT	1
Dick Greer Racing	82	(United States) John Finger	Porsche 997 GT3 Cup; Porsche 3.8L Flat-6	GT	1
Dick Greer Racing	82	(United States) Dick Greer	Porsche 997 GT3 Cup; Porsche 3.8L Flat-6	GT	1
Dick Greer Racing	82	(United States) Mark Hotchkis	Porsche 997 GT3 Cup; Porsche 3.8L Flat-6	GT	1
Dick Greer Racing	82	(United States) Owen Trinkler	Porsche 997 GT3 Cup; Porsche 3.8L Flat-6	GT	1
Racers Edge Motorsports	87	(United States) Tony Ave	Dodge Viper; Dodge 8.0L V10	GT	1, 9, 12
Racers Edge Motorsports	87	(Belgium) Jan Heylen	Dodge Viper; Dodge 8.0L V10	GT	1, 9, 12
Racers Edge Motorsports	87	(United States) Doug Peterson	Dodge Viper; Dodge 8.0L V10	GT	1, 12
Racers Edge Motorsports	87	(Belgium) Maxime Soulet	Dodge Viper; Dodge 8.0L V10	GT	1
Racers Edge Motorsports	87	(Costa Rica) Emilio Valverde	Dodge Viper; Dodge 8.0L V10	GT	1
Autohaus Motorsports	88	(United States) Jordan Taylor	Chevrolet Camaro GT.R; Chevrolet 6.0L V8	GT	1–7, 9
Autohaus Motorsports	88	(United States) Paul Edwards	Chevrolet Camaro GT.R; Chevrolet 6.0L V8	GT	1–7
Autohaus Motorsports	88	(Hong Kong) Matthew Marsh	Chevrolet Camaro GT.R; Chevrolet 6.0L V8	GT	1
Autohaus Motorsports	88	(United States) Tommy Milner	Chevrolet Camaro GT.R; Chevrolet 6.0L V8	GT	1
Autohaus Motorsports	88	(United States) Bill Lester	Chevrolet Camaro GT.R; Chevrolet 6.0L V8	GT	9
Spirit of Daytona Racing	90	(United Kingdom) Richard Westbrook	Corvette DP (Coyote CPM); Chevrolet 5.0L V8	DP	All
Spirit of Daytona Racing	90	(Spain) Antonio García	Corvette DP (Coyote CPM); Chevrolet 5.0L V8	DP	1–3, 7–10, 12–13
Spirit of Daytona Racing	90	(United Kingdom) Oliver Gavin	Corvette DP (Coyote CPM); Chevrolet 5.0L V8	DP	1, 8
Spirit of Daytona Racing	90	(Denmark) Jan Magnussen	Corvette DP (Coyote CPM); Chevrolet 5.0L V8	DP	1
Spirit of Daytona Racing	90	(Canada) Michael Valiante	Corvette DP (Coyote CPM); Chevrolet 5.0L V8	DP	3–6
Turner Motorsport	93	(United States) Bill Auberlen	BMW M3; BMW 5.0L V8	GT	1, 3
Turner Motorsport	93	(Canada) Paul Dalla Lana	BMW M3; BMW 5.0L V8	GT	1, 3
Turner Motorsport	93	(United States) Michael Marsal	BMW M3; BMW 5.0L V8	GT	1, 13
Turner Motorsport	93	(Germany) Dirk Müller	BMW M3; BMW 5.0L V8	GT	1
Turner Motorsport	93	(Germany) Dirk Werner	BMW M3; BMW 5.0L V8	GT	1
Turner Motorsport	93	(United States) Billy Johnson	BMW M3; BMW 5.0L V8	GT	3
Turner Motorsport	93	(United States) Will Turner	BMW M3; BMW 5.0L V8	GT	13
Turner Motorsport	94	(Canada) Paul Dalla Lana	BMW M3; BMW 5.0L V8	GT	All
Turner Motorsport	94	(United States) Bill Auberlen	BMW M3; BMW 5.0L V8	GT	1–3, 5–10, 12–13
Turner Motorsport	94	(United States) Billy Johnson	BMW M3; BMW 5.0L V8	GT	1–4, 6, 8–12
Turner Motorsport	94	(Germany) Dirk Müller	BMW M3; BMW 5.0L V8	GT	1
Turner Motorsport	94	(United States) Boris Said	BMW M3; BMW 5.0L V8	GT	1
Turner Motorsport	94	(United Kingdom) Ben Clucas	BMW M3; BMW 5.0L V8	GT	4
GAINSCO/Bob Stallings Racing	99	(United States) Jon Fogarty	Corvette DP (Riley XXVI); Chevrolet 5.0L V8	DP	All
GAINSCO/Bob Stallings Racing	99	(United States) Alex Gurney	Corvette DP (Riley XXVI); Chevrolet 5.0L V8	DP	All
GAINSCO/Bob Stallings Racing	99	(United States) Memo Gidley	Corvette DP (Riley XXVI); Chevrolet 5.0L V8	DP	1

=== Team changes ===
- On August 31, 2011, it was announced that Jeff Segal was testing a Ferrari F458 at the infield road course of Homestead-Miami Speedway in preparation for the 2012 season. Segal's Grand Am career dates back to 2003, with Ferrari as his primary choice of manufacturer.
- On September 1, 2011, it was announced that Riley Technologies will be debuting a new Daytona Prototype at the 2012 24 Hours of Daytona.
- On September 7, 2011, it was announced that Audi was developing a version of their R8 for the Rolex Sports Car Series GT class.
- On October 20, 2011, it was announced that Eric Curran and Boris Said would return to Marsh Racing, driving Chevrolet Corvettes.
- On October 26, 2011, it was announced that AIM Autosport would be fielding a new Ferrari 458 Italia in the 2012 season.
- On November 22, 2011, it was announced that three-time series champion Andy Lally would return to Grand-Am competition full-time, joining John Potter in the Magnus Racing Porsche 911 GT3 Cup for the full 2012 GT schedule.
- On December 3, 2011, it was announced that Racers Edge Motorsports will be switching from the Mazda RX8 to the Dodge Viper.
- On December 3, 2011, it was announced that AF Corse, Michael Waltrip and Rob Kauffman will make a partnership for the Rolex 24 at Daytona. The team will field a Ferrari F458.
- On December 3, 2011, it was announced that two teams will field a Ford Mustang in the Rolex 24 at Daytona. The former Mustang team TPN Racing/BlackForest will return with the car alongside the Rick Ware Racing, which switched from a Porsche GT3 last year.

== Daytona Prototype changes ==
On May 13, 2011, Grand Am announced that various changes would be made to the Daytona Prototypes for the 2012 season:

- The greenhouse (cockpit) area will be nearly identical for all newly constructed cars. The roll cage will be narrower on each side of the car, although the driver's position will not change. There will be a one-inch zone throughout the greenhouse surface to allow for individual styling cues, including windshield implementation and window outlines.
- New minimum body cross-section provisions will give the new DPs a more upright front fascia and nose, rather than the more sloped layout of today's cars. This will allow manufacturers to add more design character to their cars, making them closer to their production cars while still offering the dramatic message embodied by a prototype.
- Flexibility has also been introduced into the rules for side bodywork, including production-derived sidepods and open vents behind the front wheels that will enable styling elements from street cars to be functional on the race cars.

=== Additional changes ===
- On May 27, 2011, it was announced that BMW was developing a new 4.5 liter V8 which debuted at the 2012 Daytona 24. The engine is primarily derived from that of the E92 generation BMW M3.
- On November 15, 2011, Chevrolet unveiled its new Corvette-inspired DP. It made its debut at the Daytona 24.

== Results ==
Rnd	Circuit	Pole position	Fastest lap	Winner
1	Daytona	#8 Starworks Motorsport	#8 Starworks Motorsport	#60 Michael Shank Racing with Curb/Agajanian
1	Daytona	(United Kingdom) Ryan Dalziel (Germany) Lucas Luhr (United Kingdom) Allan McNish (Venezuela) Alex Popow (Venezuela) Enzo Potolicchio	(United Kingdom) Ryan Dalziel (Germany) Lucas Luhr (United Kingdom) Allan McNish (Venezuela) Alex Popow (Venezuela) Enzo Potolicchio	(United States) A. J. Allmendinger (Brazil) Oswaldo Negri (United States) John Pew (United Kingdom) Justin Wilson
1	Daytona	#59 Brumos Racing	#23 Alex Job Racing	#44 Magnus Racing
1	Daytona	(United States) Andrew Davis (United States) Hurley Haywood (United States) Leh Keen (Germany) Marc Lieb	(Germany) Marco Holzer (France) Emmanuel Collard (United States) Butch Leitzinger (United States) Cooper MacNeil	(United States) Andy Lally (Austria) Richard Lietz (United States) John Potter (Germany) René Rast
2	Barber	#90 Spirit of Daytona Racing	#90 Spirit of Daytona Racing	#90 Spirit of Daytona Racing
2	Barber	(United Kingdom) Richard Westbrook (Spain) Antonio García	(United Kingdom) Richard Westbrook (Spain) Antonio García	(United Kingdom) Richard Westbrook (Spain) Antonio García
2	Barber	#88 Autohaus Motorsports	#67 The Racer's Group	#70 SpeedSource
2	Barber	(United States) Paul Edwards (United States) Jordan Taylor	(United States) Spencer Pumpelly (United States) Steven Bertheau	(United States) Jonathan Bomarito (Canada) Sylvain Tremblay
3	Homestead	#8 Starworks Motorsport	#90 Spirit of Daytona Racing	#10 SunTrust Racing
3	Homestead	(United Kingdom) Ryan Dalziel (Venezuela) Enzo Potolicchio	(United Kingdom) Richard Westbrook (Spain) Antonio García	(Italy) Max Angelelli (United States) Ricky Taylor
3	Homestead	#44 Magnus Racing	#70 SpeedSource	#69 AIM Autosport Team FXDD Racing
3	Homestead	(United States) Andy Lally (United States) John Potter	(Canada) Sylvain Tremblay (United States) Jonathan Bomarito	(United States) Emil Assentato (United States) Jeff Segal
4	New Jersey	#10 SunTrust Racing	#9 Action Express Racing	#10 SunTrust Racing
4	New Jersey	(United States) Ricky Taylor (Italy) Max Angelelli	(Portugal) João Barbosa (United States) Terry Borcheller (United States) J. C. France	(Italy) Max Angelelli (United States) Ricky Taylor
4	New Jersey	#57 Stevenson Motorsports	#88 Autohaus Motorsports	#69 AIM Autosport Team FXDD Racing
4	New Jersey	(United States) John Edwards (United Kingdom) Robin Liddell	(United States) Jordan Taylor (United States) Paul Edwards	(United States) Emil Assentato (United States) Jeff Segal
5	Belle Isle	#99 GAINSCO/Bob Stallings Racing	#9 Action Express Racing	#9 Action Express Racing
5	Belle Isle	(United States) Jon Fogarty (United States) Alex Gurney	(Portugal) João Barbosa (United States) J. C. France (United States) Darren Law	(Portugal) João Barbosa (United States) J. C. France (United States) Darren Law
5	Belle Isle	#03 Extreme Speed Motorsports	#03 Extreme Speed Motorsports	#88 Autohaus Motorsports
5	Belle Isle	(United States) Guy Cosmo (United States) Scott Sharp	(United States) Guy Cosmo (United States) Scott Sharp	(United States) Paul Edwards (United States) Jordan Taylor
6	Mid-Ohio	#99 GAINSCO/Bob Stallings Racing	#99 GAINSCO/Bob Stallings Racing	#90 Spirit of Daytona Racing
6	Mid-Ohio	(United States) Jon Fogarty (United States) Alex Gurney	(United States) Alex Gurney (United States) Jon Fogarty	(United Kingdom) Richard Westbrook (Canada) Michael Valiante
6	Mid-Ohio	#57 Stevenson Motorsports	#69 AIM Autosport Team FXDD Racing	#94 Turner Motorsport
6	Mid-Ohio	(United States) John Edwards (United Kingdom) Robin Liddell	(United States) Jeff Segal (United States) Emil Assentato	(United States) Bill Auberlen (Canada) Paul Dalla Lana (United States) Billy Johnson
7	Road America	#01 Chip Ganassi Racing	#90 Spirit of Daytona Racing	#01 Chip Ganassi Racing
7	Road America	(United States) Scott Pruett (Mexico) Memo Rojas	(United Kingdom) Richard Westbrook (Spain) Antonio García	(United States) Scott Pruett (Mexico) Memo Rojas
7	Road America	#69 AIM Autosport Team FXDD Racing	#94 Turner Motorsport	#69 AIM Autosport Team FXDD Racing
7	Road America	(United States) Emil Assentato (United States) Jeff Segal	(United States) Bill Auberlen (Canada) Paul Dalla Lana	(United States) Emil Assentato (United States) Jeff Segal
8	Watkins Glen Long	#01 Chip Ganassi Racing	#99 GAINSCO/Bob Stallings Racing	#9 Action Express Racing
8	Watkins Glen Long	(United States) Scott Pruett (Mexico) Memo Rojas	(United States) Alex Gurney (United States) Jon Fogarty	(Portugal) João Barbosa (United States) Darren Law
8	Watkins Glen Long	#75 Stevenson Motorsports	#94 Turner Motorsport	#57 Stevenson Motorsports
8	Watkins Glen Long	(United States) Jordan Taylor (United States) Matt Bell (Denmark) Ronnie Bremer	(United States) Bill Auberlen (Canada) Paul Dalla Lana (United States) Billy Johnson	(United States) John Edwards (United Kingdom) Robin Liddell
9	Indianapolis	#99 GAINSCO/Bob Stallings Racing	#2 Starworks Motorsport	#2 Starworks Motorsport
9	Indianapolis	(United States) Jon Fogarty (United States) Alex Gurney	(France) Sébastien Bourdais (Venezuela) Alex Popow	(France) Sébastien Bourdais (Venezuela) Alex Popow
9	Indianapolis	#70 SpeedSource	#66 TRG	#44 Magnus Racing
9	Indianapolis	(United States) Jonathan Bomarito (Canada) Sylvain Tremblay	(Germany) Jörg Bergmeister (United States) Ben Keating	(United States) Andy Lally (United States) John Potter
10	Watkins Glen Short	#10 SunTrust Racing	#8 Starworks Motorsport	#8 Starworks Motorsport
10	Watkins Glen Short	(United States) Ricky Taylor (Italy) Max Angelelli	(United Kingdom) Ryan Dalziel (Germany) Lucas Luhr	(United Kingdom) Ryan Dalziel (Germany) Lucas Luhr
10	Watkins Glen Short	#31 Marsh Racing	#31 Marsh Racing	#94 Turner Motorsport
10	Watkins Glen Short	(United States) Boris Said (United States) Eric Curran	(United States) Boris Said (United States) Eric Curran	(United States) Bill Auberlen (Canada) Paul Dalla Lana (United States) Billy Johnson
11	Montreal	#99 GAINSCO/Bob Stallings Racing	#2 Starworks Motorsport	#01 Chip Ganassi Racing
11	Montreal	(United States) Jon Fogarty (United States) Alex Gurney	(Canada) Alex Tagliani (Venezuela) Alex Popow	(United States) Scott Pruett (Mexico) Memo Rojas
11	Montreal	#57 Stevenson Motorsports	#69 AIM Autosport Team FXDD Racing	#57 Stevenson Motorsports
11	Montreal	(United States) John Edwards (United Kingdom) Robin Liddell	(United States) Jeff Segal (United States) Emil Assentato	(United States) John Edwards (United Kingdom) Robin Liddell
12	Laguna Seca	#90 Spirit of Daytona Racing	#90 Spirit of Daytona Racing	#90 Spirit of Daytona Racing
12	Laguna Seca	(United Kingdom) Richard Westbrook (Spain) Antonio García	(United Kingdom) Richard Westbrook (Spain) Antonio García	(United Kingdom) Richard Westbrook (Spain) Antonio García
12	Laguna Seca	#63 Scuderia Corsa	#63 Scuderia Corsa	#43 Team Sahlen
12	Laguna Seca	(Italy) Alessandro Balzan (Monaco) Olivier Beretta	(Italy) Alessandro Balzan (Monaco) Olivier Beretta	(United States) Dane Cameron (United States) Wayne Nonnamaker
13	Lime Rock	#90 Spirit of Daytona Racing	#90 Spirit of Daytona Racing	#10 SunTrust Racing
13	Lime Rock	(United Kingdom) Richard Westbrook (Spain) Antonio García	(United Kingdom) Richard Westbrook (Spain) Antonio García	(Italy) Max Angelelli (United States) Ricky Taylor
13	Lime Rock	#57 Stevenson Motorsports	#57 Stevenson Motorsports	#57 Stevenson Motorsports
13	Lime Rock	(United States) John Edwards (United Kingdom) Robin Liddell	(United States) John Edwards (United Kingdom) Robin Liddell	(United States) John Edwards (United Kingdom) Robin Liddell

== Championship standings ==
=== Daytona Prototypes ===
==== Drivers ====
Pos	Driver	R24	BIR	HOM	NJ	BEL	LEX	ELK	S6H	IMS	WAT	MON	LGA	LIM	Points
1	(United States) Scott Pruett	6	3	2	10	3	2	1	**4**	2	3	1	6	7	379
1	(Mexico) Memo Rojas	6	3	2	10	3	2	**1**	4	2	3	1	6	7	379
2	(United Kingdom) Ryan Dalziel	**2**	4	6	2	6	5	2	3	7	1	8	3	6	367
3	(United States) Darren Law	5	9	3	4	1	6	6	1	5	8	4	5	5	355
4	(United States) David Donohue	5	9	3	4	2	3	4	7	8	6	3	9	4	348
5	(Venezuela) Alex Popow	2	6	4	6	7	4	9	8	1	2	7	8	6	346
6	(Italy) Max Angelelli	14	5	1	1	10	9	7	11	3	4	5	7	1	343
6	(United States) Ricky Taylor	14	5	1	**1**	10	9	7	11	3	**4**	5	7	1	343
7	(Portugal) João Barbosa	9	7	8	7	1	6	6	1	5	8	4	5	5	342
8	(United States) Jon Fogarty	13	2	9	9	**4**	**7**	10	2	**10**	5	**2**	2	3	340
8	(United States) Alex Gurney	13	2	9	9	4	7	10	2	10	5	2	2	3	340
9	(Brazil) Oswaldo Negri	1	8	7	3	5	8	3	6	11	7	6	4	10	334
9	(United States) John Pew	1	8	7	3	5	8	3	6	11	7	6	4	10	334
10	(United Kingdom) Richard Westbrook	8	**1**	5	5	9	1	8	5	9	9†	9†	**1**	**2**	305
11	(Venezuela) Enzo Potolicchio	2	4	**6**	2	6	5	2	3	7					254
12	(Germany) Lucas Luhr	2	6	4	6	7	4	9	8		1†				207
13	(Spain) Antonio García	8	1	5				8	5	9†	9†		1	2	200
14	(United States) Terry Borcheller	9	7†	8	7	2	3	4†	7	8	6†	3†	9†	4†	178
15	(Canada) Paul Tracy	7			8				10	6		3	9		145
16	(United States) Colin Braun	11				8		5	9				10		112
17	(France) Sébastien Bourdais								3	1	2				97
18	(United States) Jim Lowe	7			8				10	6					93
19	(Canada) Michael Valiante	10			5	9†	1					9†			82
20	(United States) Brian Frisselle	7							10					4	73
21	(New Zealand) Scott Dixon	4								4					56
21	(Colombia) Juan Pablo Montoya	4								4					56
22	(Venezuela) Jorge Goncalvez	3												8	53
23	(United Kingdom) Oliver Gavin	8							5						49
24	(United States) Scott Mayer	10				8†		5	9†				10†		47
25	(United States) J. C. France	9	7	8†	7†	1†	6†	6†							46
26	(United States) A. J. Allmendinger	1													35
26	(United Kingdom) Justin Wilson	1													35
27	(United Kingdom) Allan McNish	2													32
28	(United States) Michael McDowell	3													30
28	(Brazil) Felipe Nasr	3													30
28	(Colombia) Gustavo Yacamán	3													30
29	(United Kingdom) Dario Franchitti	4													28
29	(United States) Jamie McMurray	4								4†					28
30	(Brazil) Christian Fittipaldi	5													26
31	(United States) Joey Hand	6													25
31	(United States) Graham Rahal	6													25
32	(United States) Burt Frisselle	7													24
33	(United States) Martin Fuentes													8	23
33	(Denmark) Jan Magnussen	8													23
34	(Italy) Max Papis	9													22
34	(Canada) Mark Wilkins								9					9†	22
35	(United States) Billy Johnson	7†												9	22
36	(United States) Marco Andretti	10													21
36	(United States) Ryan Hunter-Reay	10													21
37	(Sweden) Niclas Jönsson	11													20
37	(United States) Tracy Krohn	11													20
37	(Brazil) Ricardo Zonta	11													20
38	(United States) Byron Defoor	12													19
38	(United States) Carlos de Quesada	12													19
38	(United States) Elliott Forbes-Robinson	12													19
38	(United Kingdom) Brian Johnson	12													19
38	(United States) Jim Pace	12													19
39	(Mexico) Memo Gidley	13													18
NC	(Australia) Ryan Briscoe	14†													0
NC	(Canada) Alex Tagliani											7/8†	3/8†		0
NC	(United States) Jordan Taylor										6†				0

Colour	Result
Gold	Winner
Silver	Second place
Bronze	Third place
Green	Points classification
Blue	Non-points classification
Blue	Non-classified finish (NC)
Purple	Retired, not classified (Ret)
Red	Did not qualify (DNQ)
Red	Did not pre-qualify (DNPQ)
Black	Disqualified (DSQ)
White	Did not start (DNS)
White	Withdrew (WD)
White	Race cancelled (C)
Blank	Did not practice (DNP)
Blank	Did not arrive (DNA)
Blank	Excluded (EX)

**Bold** - Pole position
Italics - Fastest lap

===== Notes =====
- Drivers denoted by † did not complete sufficient laps in order to score points.

==== Chassis ====
Pos	Chassis	R24	BIR	HOM	NJ	BEL	LEX	ELK	S6H	IMS	WAT	MON	LAG	LIM	Pts
1	(United States) Riley	**1**	2	**2**	2	**3**	**2**	**1**	**2**	**1**	1	**1**	2	3	427
2	(United States) Coyote	5	**1**	3	4	1	1	4	1	5	6	3	**1**	**2**	400
3	(Italy) Dallara	7	5	1	**1**	10	9	7	10	3	**4**	5	7	1	351
4	(United Kingdom) Lola	11													20
Pos	Chassis	R24	BIR	HOM	NJ	BEL	LEX	ELK	S6H	IMS	WAT	MON	LAG	LIM	Pts

==== Engine ====
Pos	Engine	R24	BIR	HOM	NJ	BEL	LEX	ELK	S6H	IMS	WAT	MON	LAG	LIM	Pts
1	(United States) Chevrolet	5	**1**	1	**1**	**1**	**1**	4	1	**3**	**4**	**2**	**1**	**1**	424
2	(United States) Ford	**1**	4	**4**	2	5	4	2	3	1	1	6	3	6	389
3	(Germany) BMW	4	3	2	10	3	2	**1**	**4**	2	3	1	6	7	382
Pos	Engine	R24	BIR	HOM	NJ	BEL	LEX	ELK	S6H	IMS	WAT	MON	LAG	LIM	Pts

=== Grand Touring ===
==== Drivers (Top 30) ====
Pos	Driver	R24	BIR	HOM	NJ	BEL	LEX	ELK	S6H	IMS	WAT	MON	LAG	LIM	Points
1	(United States) Emil Assentato	8	2	1	1	4	2	**1**	3	5	7	2	2	8	387
1	(United States) Jeff Segal	8	2	1	1	4	2	1	3	5	7	2	2	8	387
2	(United Kingdom) Robin Liddell	4	7	3	2	3	**3**	6	1	15	14	1	8	1	360
3	(Canada) Paul Dalla Lana	16	5	5	4	5	1	2	2	4	1	12	10	16	339
4	(United States) Jonathan Bomarito	6	1	12	7	2	4	3	7	**2**	12	5	9	11	336
4	(Canada) Sylvain Tremblay	6	1	12	7	2	4	3	7	2	12	5	9	11	336
5	(United States) Andrew Davis	**3**	3	6	9	13	7	5	6	3	3	4	6	15	329
5	(United States) Leh Keen	3	3	6	9	13	7	5	6	3	3	4	6	15	329
6	(United States) Dane Cameron	12	9	2	6	8	6	4	9	8	10	3	1	12	324
6	(United States) Wayne Nonnamaker	12	9	2	6	8	6	4	9	8	10	3	1	12	324
7	(United States) Andy Lally	1	4	7	3	6	5	14	21†	1	4	11	3	6	323
7	(United States) John Potter	1	4	**7**	3	6	5	14	21†	1	4	11	3	6	323
8	(United States) John Edwards	4			**2**	3	3	6	1	15	14	**1**	8	**1**	306
9	(United States) Charles Espenlaub	10	8	15	11	15	11	8	8	9	5	6	11	4	280
9	(United States) Charles Putman	10	8	15	11	15	11	8	8	9	5	6	11	4	280
10	(United States) Bill Auberlen	16	5	5		5	1	2	2	4	1		10	16†	277
11	(United States) Eric Curran	30	12	18	8	12	14	7	20	7	2	7	7	7	270
12	(United States) Boris Said	43	12	18	8	12	14		20	7	**2**	7	7	7	246
13	(South Africa) Dion von Moltke	31	11	17	14	11	13	12	18	18	13	9	12	2	241
14	(United States) Joe Nonnamaker	12	16	19	15	9	12	13	14	20	6	10	15	10	232
15	(United States) Jordan Taylor	9	6	9	5	1	9	9	**5**	10					221
16	(United States) Patrick Lindsey		14	11	12	10	16	10	10	19	11		16	13	199
17	(United States) Will Nonnamaker	12	17	19†	15		15	13	14	20	9	10	14	10	189
18	(United States) Spencer Pumpelly	2	10	4	10	14	8	16†	15					5	184
19	(United States) Joe Foster	10	13	14		16	10	11	16	21	16†		13	9	177
20	(United States) Paul Edwards	9	**6**	9	5	1	9	9							174
21	(United States) Jim Norman	31	11	17	14	11	13	12†	18	18	13	9†	12	2†	168
22	(United States) Eric Foss		14	11	12	10	16	10	10	19	11†		16	13†	161
23	(United States) Steven Bertheau	2	10	4	10	14	8	16†							142
24	(United States) Patrick Dempsey	10	13	14†		16	10	11	16	21			13		138
25	(United States) Billy Johnson	43	5†	10	4		1†		2	4	1†	12†			125
26	(Denmark) Ronnie Bremer	4	7	3					5	17					122
27	(United States) Tom Long	10		14	16				16			8		9	113
28	(United States) Johannes van Overbeek	13							4				5	3	102
29	(United States) Guy Cosmo	13		13		**7**			4						88
30	(United States) Joe Sahlen		17				15		14		9		14		86

Colour	Result
Gold	Winner
Silver	Second place
Bronze	Third place
Green	Points classification
Blue	Non-points classification
Blue	Non-classified finish (NC)
Purple	Retired, not classified (Ret)
Red	Did not qualify (DNQ)
Red	Did not pre-qualify (DNPQ)
Black	Disqualified (DSQ)
White	Did not start (DNS)
White	Withdrew (WD)
White	Race cancelled (C)
Blank	Did not practice (DNP)
Blank	Did not arrive (DNA)
Blank	Excluded (EX)

**Bold** - Pole position
Italics - Fastest lap

===== Notes =====
- Drivers denoted by † did not complete sufficient laps in order to score points.

==== Engine ====
Pos	Engine	R24	BIR	HOM	NJ	BEL	LEX	ELK	S6H	IMS	WAT	MON	LAG	LIM	Points
1	(Italy) Ferrari	5	2	1	1	4	2	1	3	5	7	2	2	3	397
2	(United States) Chevrolet	4	6	3	2	1	3	6	1	7	2	1	7	1	390
3	(Japan) Mazda	6	1	2	6	2	4	3	7	2	5	3	1	4	379
4	(Germany) Porsche	1	3	4	3	6	5	5	6	1	3	4	3	5	374
5	(Germany) BMW	16	5	5	4	5	1	2	2	4	1	12	10	14	341
6	(Germany) Audi	31	11	17	13	11	13	12	12	18	13	9	12	2	248
7	(United States) Ford	38	18					15		12					64
8	(United States) Dodge	42								16			17		45
Pos	Engine	R24	BIR	HOM	NJ	BEL	LEX	ELK	S6H	IMS	WAT	MON	LAG	LIM	Points

== North American Endurance Championship ==
The 2012 season marks the start of a three-race "endurance championship" featuring the 24 Hours of Daytona, the Six Hours of Watkins Glen, and the new race at Indianapolis. In Daytona, there are points in 6, 12, 18 and 24 hours. In Watkins Glen 3 and 6 with double points, and quadruple points in Indianapolis at the end of the race.

Place	Points
1	5
2	4
3	3
4 at last	2

=== NAEC Daytona Prototypes ===
Rank	Driver	R24				S6H		IMS	Pts
Rank	Driver	6H	12H	18H	24H	3H	6H	IMS	Pts
1	(Venezuela) Alex Popow	7	1	3	2	11	8	1	42
2	(United States) Scott Pruett	3	3	2	6	2	2	2	40
2	(Mexico) Memo Rojas	3	3	2	6	2	2	2	40
3	(United States) Darren Law	8	4	5	5	1	1	5	36
3	(Portugal) Joao Barbosa	9	6	10	9	1	1	5	36
4	(United Kingdom) Ryan Dalziel	7	1	3	2	3	3	13	34
4	(Venezuela) Enzo Potolicchio	7	1	3	2	3	3	13	34
5	(United States) John Pew	4	2	1	1	6	6	11	32
5	(Brazil) Oswaldo Negri	4	2	1	1	6	6	13	32
5	(France) Sébastien Bourdais					3	3	1	32
6	(United States) Alex Gurney	2	12	13	13	4	2	10	30
6	(United States) Jon Fogarty	2	12	13	13	4	2	10	30

=== NAEC Grand Touring ===
Rank	Driver	R24				S6H		IMS	Pts
Rank	Driver	6H	12H	18H	24H	3H	6H	IMS	Pts
1	(United States) Andy Lally	2	2	3	1	21	21	1	44
1	(United States) John Potter	2	2	3	1	21	21	1	44
2	(United States) Jonathan Bomarito	7	7	7	6	1	7	2	38
2	(Canada) Sylvain Tremblay	7	7	7	6	1	7	2	38
3	(United Kingdom) Robin Liddell	1	4	4	4	3	1	15	35
3	(United States) John Edwards	1	4	4	4	3	1	15	35
3	(United States) Leh Keen	8	1	1	3	7	6	3	35
3	(United States) Andrew Davis	8	1	1	3	7	6	3	35
4	(Denmark) Ronnie Bremer	1	4	4	4	2	5	17	31
