= 2012 24 Hours of Daytona =

| Previous: 2011 | Next: 2013 |
Index: Races | Winners

Track map of Daytona International Speedway

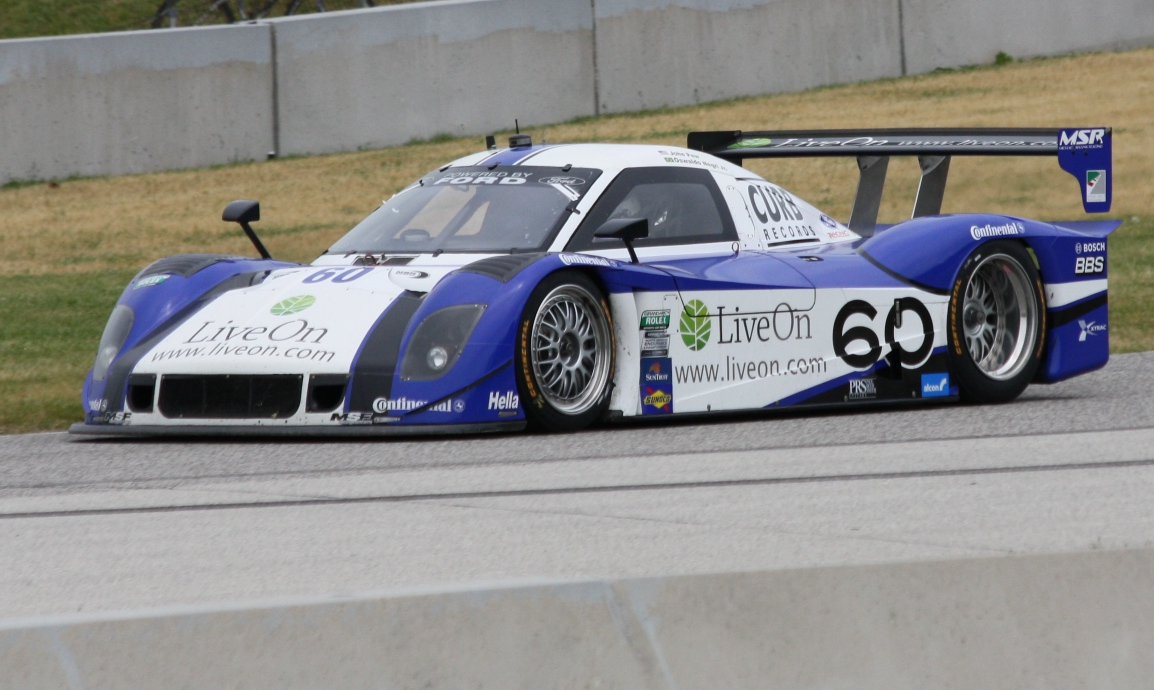
#60 Michael Shank Racing winner of DP category

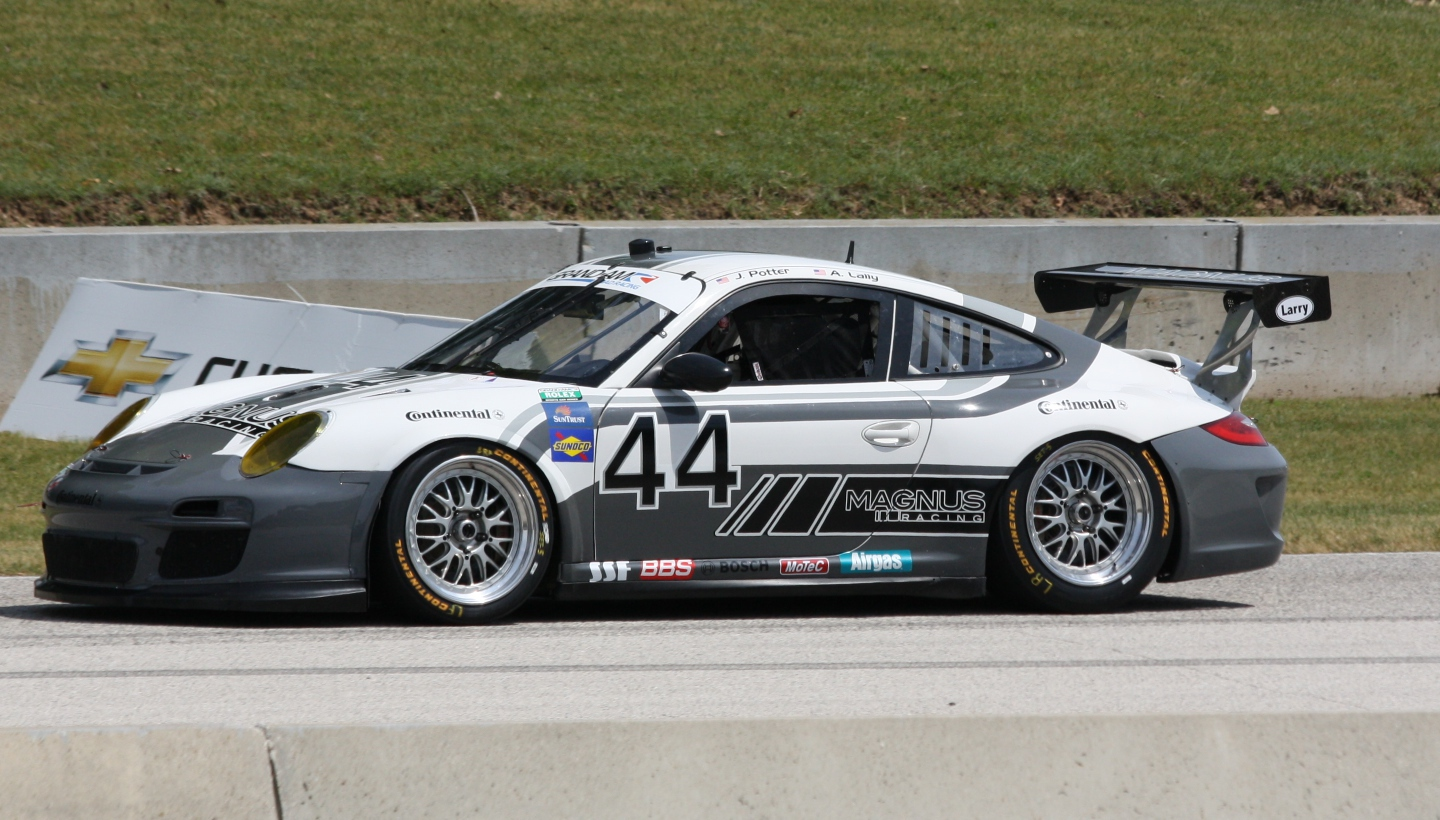
#44 Magnus Racing winner of GT category

The 2012 Rolex 24 at Daytona was a long-distance motor race for sports cars conforming to the regulations of the Grand-Am Road Racing series. The race was held over a duration of 24 hours, starting at 3:30pm on Saturday, January 28, finishing at 3:30pm the following day. The race was held on the sports car version of Daytona International Speedway, which includes only a portion of the NASCAR Superspeedway course and a loop of circuit which winds through the infield of the speedway.

2012 was the 50th running of the race which had begun as a three-hour duration sports car race in 1962. The race was also the opening round of the 2012 Rolex Sports Car Series season. A field of 14 Daytona Prototypes took the start of the race along with a grid of 44 of the slower roadcar-based Grand Touring class cars.

This race also was part of the inaugural North American Endurance Championship.

== Qualifying ==
Pole position for the race was taken by British racing driver Ryan Dalziel driving the Starworks Motorsport run Riley Technologies Mk.XXVI Daytona Prototype sports car recording a lap time of 1:41.119.

In the Grand Touring class, pole was claimed by the Brumos Racing Porsche 911 GT3 Cup driven by American driver Andrew Davis.

== Winners ==
The Michael Shank Racing entry of A. J. Allmendinger, Justin Wilson, Oswaldo Negri Jr., and John Pew took victory in their No. 60 Riley Mk. XXVI Ford, completing 761 laps over the course of the 24-hour race. They enjoyed a spirited battle with the No. 8 Starworks Motorsport Riley Mk. XXVI Ford of Ryan Dalziel, Lucas Luhr, Allan McNish, Enzo Potolicchio, and Alex Popow, which led the most laps and posted the quickest time of the race, but suffered a minor accident in the 17th hour.

In GT, Magnus Racing earned its first-ever Rolex Sports Car Series victory, with the lineup of Richard Lietz, Andy Lally, René Rast, and John Potter in the No. 44 Porsche 911 GT3 Cup car. It was Lally's fourth Rolex 24 class victory, and the first for the other three drivers.

== Race results ==
Class winners in bold.

| Pos | Class | No | Team | Drivers | Chassis | Laps |
| Pos | Class | No | Team | Drivers | Engine | Laps |
|---|---|---|---|---|---|---|
| 1 | **DP** | **60** | **(United States) Michael Shank Racing with Curb Agajanian** | **(United States) A. J. Allmendinger (Brazil) Oswaldo Negri Jr. (United States) John Pew (United Kingdom) Justin Wilson** | **Riley Mk. XXVI** | **761** |
| 1 | **DP** | **60** | **(United States) Michael Shank Racing with Curb Agajanian** | **(United States) A. J. Allmendinger (Brazil) Oswaldo Negri Jr. (United States) John Pew (United Kingdom) Justin Wilson** | Ford 5.0L V8 | **761** |
| 2 | DP | 8 | (United States) Starworks Motorsport | (United Kingdom) Ryan Dalziel (Germany) Lucas Luhr (United Kingdom) Allan McNish (Venezuela) Alex Popow (Venezuela) Enzo Potolicchio | Riley Mk. XXVI | 761 |
| 2 | DP | 8 | (United States) Starworks Motorsport | (United Kingdom) Ryan Dalziel (Germany) Lucas Luhr (United Kingdom) Allan McNish (Venezuela) Alex Popow (Venezuela) Enzo Potolicchio | Ford 5.0L V8 | 761 |
| 3 | DP | 6 | (United States) Michael Shank Racing with Curb Agajanian | (Venezuela) Jorge Goncalvez (United States) Michael McDowell (Brazil) Felipe Nasr (Colombia) Gustavo Yacamán | Riley Mk. XX | 761 |
| 3 | DP | 6 | (United States) Michael Shank Racing with Curb Agajanian | (Venezuela) Jorge Goncalvez (United States) Michael McDowell (Brazil) Felipe Nasr (Colombia) Gustavo Yacamán | Ford 5.0L V8 | 761 |
| 4 | DP | 02 | (United States) Chip Ganassi Racing with Felix Sabates | (New Zealand) Scott Dixon (United Kingdom) Dario Franchitti (United States) Jamie McMurray (Colombia) Juan Pablo Montoya | Riley Mk. XXVI | 760 |
| 4 | DP | 02 | (United States) Chip Ganassi Racing with Felix Sabates | (New Zealand) Scott Dixon (United Kingdom) Dario Franchitti (United States) Jamie McMurray (Colombia) Juan Pablo Montoya | BMW 5.0L V8 | 760 |
| 5 | DP | 5 | (United States) Action Express Racing | (United States) David Donohue (Brazil) Christian Fittipaldi (United States) Darren Law | Corvette DP (Coyote CPM) | 758 |
| 5 | DP | 5 | (United States) Action Express Racing | (United States) David Donohue (Brazil) Christian Fittipaldi (United States) Darren Law | Chevrolet 5.0L V8 | 758 |
| 6 | DP | 01 | (United States) Chip Ganassi Racing with Felix Sabates | (United States) Joey Hand (United States) Scott Pruett (United States) Graham Rahal (Mexico) Memo Rojas | Riley Mk. XXVI | 757 |
| 6 | DP | 01 | (United States) Chip Ganassi Racing with Felix Sabates | (United States) Joey Hand (United States) Scott Pruett (United States) Graham Rahal (Mexico) Memo Rojas | BMW 5.0L V8 | 757 |
| 7 | DP | 77 | (United States) Doran Racing | (United States) Brian Frisselle (United States) Burt Frisselle (United States) Billy Johnson (United States) Jim Lowe (Canada) Paul Tracy | Dallara DP-01 | 748 |
| 7 | DP | 77 | (United States) Doran Racing | (United States) Brian Frisselle (United States) Burt Frisselle (United States) Billy Johnson (United States) Jim Lowe (Canada) Paul Tracy | Ford 5.0L V8 | 748 |
| 8 | DP | 90 | (United States) Spirit of Daytona Racing | (Spain) Antonio García (United Kingdom) Oliver Gavin (Denmark) Jan Magnussen (United Kingdom) Richard Westbrook | Corvette DP (Coyote CPM) | 746 |
| 8 | DP | 90 | (United States) Spirit of Daytona Racing | (Spain) Antonio García (United Kingdom) Oliver Gavin (Denmark) Jan Magnussen (United Kingdom) Richard Westbrook | Chevrolet 5.0L V8 | 746 |
| 9 | DP | 9 | (United States) Action Express Racing | (Portugal) João Barbosa (United States) Terry Borcheller (United States) J. C. France (Italy) Max Papis | Corvette DP (Coyote CPM) | 739 |
| 9 | DP | 9 | (United States) Action Express Racing | (Portugal) João Barbosa (United States) Terry Borcheller (United States) J. C. France (Italy) Max Papis | Chevrolet 5.0L V8 | 739 |
| 10 | DP | 2 | (United States) Starworks Motorsport | (United States) Marco Andretti (United States) Ryan Hunter-Reay (United States) Scott Mayer (Canada) Michael Valiante | Riley Mk. XX | 736 |
| 10 | DP | 2 | (United States) Starworks Motorsport | (United States) Marco Andretti (United States) Ryan Hunter-Reay (United States) Scott Mayer (Canada) Michael Valiante | Ford 5.0L V8 | 736 |
| 11 | **GT** | **44** | **(United States) Magnus Racing** | **(United States) Andy Lally (Austria) Richard Lietz (United States) John Potter (Germany) René Rast** | **Porsche 997 GT3 Cup** | **727** |
| 11 | **GT** | **44** | **(United States) Magnus Racing** | **(United States) Andy Lally (Austria) Richard Lietz (United States) John Potter (Germany) René Rast** | Porsche 3.8L Flat-6 | **727** |
| 12 | GT | 67 | (United States) The Racer's Group | (United States) Steven Bertheau (Netherlands) Jeroen Bleekemolen (Belgium) Marc Goossens (Germany) Wolf Henzler (United States) Spencer Pumpelly | Porsche 997 GT3 Cup | 727 |
| 12 | GT | 67 | (United States) The Racer's Group | (United States) Steven Bertheau (Netherlands) Jeroen Bleekemolen (Belgium) Marc Goossens (Germany) Wolf Henzler (United States) Spencer Pumpelly | Porsche 3.8L Flat-6 | 727 |
| 13 | GT | 59 | (United States) Brumos Racing | (United States) Andrew Davis (United States) Hurley Haywood (United States) Leh Keen (Germany) Marc Lieb | Porsche 997 GT3 Cup | 726 |
| 13 | GT | 59 | (United States) Brumos Racing | (United States) Andrew Davis (United States) Hurley Haywood (United States) Leh Keen (Germany) Marc Lieb | Porsche 3.8L Flat-6 | 726 |
| 14 | GT | 57 | (United States) Stevenson Motorsports | (Denmark) Ronnie Bremer (United States) John Edwards (United Kingdom) Robin Liddell | Chevrolet Camaro GT.R | 726 |
| 14 | GT | 57 | (United States) Stevenson Motorsports | (Denmark) Ronnie Bremer (United States) John Edwards (United Kingdom) Robin Liddell | Chevrolet 6.0L V8 | 726 |
| 15 | GT | 63 | (United States) Risi Competizione | (Monaco) Olivier Beretta (Italy) Andrea Bertolini (Finland) Toni Vilander | Ferrari 458 Italia | 726 |
| 15 | GT | 63 | (United States) Risi Competizione | (Monaco) Olivier Beretta (Italy) Andrea Bertolini (Finland) Toni Vilander | Ferrari 4.5L V8 | 726 |
| 16 | GT | 70 | (United States) SpeedSource | (United States) Jonathan Bomarito (United Kingdom) Marino Franchitti (Canada) James Hinchcliffe (Canada) Sylvain Tremblay | Mazda RX-8 | 722 |
| 16 | GT | 70 | (United States) SpeedSource | (United States) Jonathan Bomarito (United Kingdom) Marino Franchitti (Canada) James Hinchcliffe (Canada) Sylvain Tremblay | Mazda 2.0L 3-Rotor | 722 |
| 17 | GT | 66 | (United States) The Racer's Group | (Germany) Dominik Farnbacher (United States) Ben Keating (France) Patrick Pilet (Denmark) Allan Simonsen | Porsche 997 GT3 Cup | 721 |
| 17 | GT | 66 | (United States) The Racer's Group | (Germany) Dominik Farnbacher (United States) Ben Keating (France) Patrick Pilet (Denmark) Allan Simonsen | Porsche 3.8L Flat-6 | 721 |
| 18 | GT | 69 | (United States) AIM Autosport/Team FXDD Racing with Ferrari | (United States) Emil Assentato (United States) Anthony Lazzaro (United States) Nick Longhi (United States) Jeff Segal | Ferrari 458 Italia | 716 |
| 18 | GT | 69 | (United States) AIM Autosport/Team FXDD Racing with Ferrari | (United States) Emil Assentato (United States) Anthony Lazzaro (United States) Nick Longhi (United States) Jeff Segal | Ferrari 4.5L V8 | 716 |
| 19 | DP | 76 | (United States) Krohn Racing | (United States) Colin Braun (Sweden) Niclas Jönsson (United States) Tracy Krohn (Brazil) Ricardo Zonta | Lola B08/70 | 713 |
| 19 | DP | 76 | (United States) Krohn Racing | (United States) Colin Braun (Sweden) Niclas Jönsson (United States) Tracy Krohn (Brazil) Ricardo Zonta | Ford 5.0L V8 | 713 |
| 20 | GT | 88 | (United States) Autohaus Motorsports | (United States) Paul Edwards (Hong Kong) Matthew Marsh (United States) Tommy Milner (United States) Jordan Taylor | Chevrolet Camaro GT.R | 713 |
| 20 | GT | 88 | (United States) Autohaus Motorsports | (United States) Paul Edwards (Hong Kong) Matthew Marsh (United States) Tommy Milner (United States) Jordan Taylor | Chevrolet 6.0L V8 | 713 |
| 21 | GT | 40 | (United States) Dempsey Racing | (United States) Patrick Dempsey (United States) Charles Espenlaub (United States) Joe Foster (United States) Tom Long (United States) Charles Putman | Mazda RX-8 | 713 |
| 21 | GT | 40 | (United States) Dempsey Racing | (United States) Patrick Dempsey (United States) Charles Espenlaub (United States) Joe Foster (United States) Tom Long (United States) Charles Putman | Mazda 2.0L 3-Rotor | 713 |
| 22 | GT | 32 | (United States) Orbit Racing/GMG | (France) Nicolas Armindo (United States) Bret Curtis (United States) Shane Lewis (United States) James Sofronas (United States) Lance Willsey | Porsche 997 GT3 Cup | 713 |
| 22 | GT | 32 | (United States) Orbit Racing/GMG | (France) Nicolas Armindo (United States) Bret Curtis (United States) Shane Lewis (United States) James Sofronas (United States) Lance Willsey | Porsche 3.8L Flat-6 | 713 |
| 23 | GT | 42 | (United States) Team Sahlen | (United States) Dane Cameron (United States) Joe Nonnamaker (United States) Wayne Nonnamaker (United States) Will Nonnamaker | Mazda RX-8 | 711 |
| 23 | GT | 42 | (United States) Team Sahlen | (United States) Dane Cameron (United States) Joe Nonnamaker (United States) Wayne Nonnamaker (United States) Will Nonnamaker | Mazda 2.0L 3-Rotor | 711 |
| 24 | GT | 03 | (United States) Extreme Speed Motorsports | (United States) Ed Brown (United States) Guy Cosmo (United States) Scott Sharp (United States) Johannes van Overbeek | Ferrari 458 Italia | 707 |
| 24 | GT | 03 | (United States) Extreme Speed Motorsports | (United States) Ed Brown (United States) Guy Cosmo (United States) Scott Sharp (United States) Johannes van Overbeek | Ferrari 4.5L V8 | 707 |
| 25 | GT | 24 | (United States) Alex Job Racing | (United States) Michael Avenatti (United States) Bob Faieta (United States) Fred Poordad (United States) Bill Sweedler (United States) Cort Wagner | Porsche 997 GT3 Cup | 707 |
| 25 | GT | 24 | (United States) Alex Job Racing | (United States) Michael Avenatti (United States) Bob Faieta (United States) Fred Poordad (United States) Bill Sweedler (United States) Cort Wagner | Porsche 3.8L Flat-6 | 707 |
| 26 | GT | 45 | (United States) Flying Lizard Motorsports with Wright Motorsports | (Germany) Jörg Bergmeister (United States) Patrick Long (United States) Seth Neiman (Germany) Mike Rockenfeller | Porsche 997 GT3 Cup | 706 |
| 26 | GT | 45 | (United States) Flying Lizard Motorsports with Wright Motorsports | (Germany) Jörg Bergmeister (United States) Patrick Long (United States) Seth Neiman (Germany) Mike Rockenfeller | Porsche 3.8L Flat-6 | 706 |
| 27 | GT | 93 | (United States) Turner Motorsport | (United States) Bill Auberlen (Canada) Paul Dalla Lana (United States) Michael Marsal (Germany) Dirk Müller (Germany) Dirk Werner | BMW M3 | 691 |
| 27 | GT | 93 | (United States) Turner Motorsport | (United States) Bill Auberlen (Canada) Paul Dalla Lana (United States) Michael Marsal (Germany) Dirk Müller (Germany) Dirk Werner | BMW 5.0L V8 | 691 |
| 28 | GT | 23 | (United States) Alex Job Racing | (France) Emmanuel Collard (Germany) Marco Holzer (United States) Butch Leitzinger (United States) Cooper MacNeil | Porsche 997 GT3 Cup | 689 |
| 28 | GT | 23 | (United States) Alex Job Racing | (France) Emmanuel Collard (Germany) Marco Holzer (United States) Butch Leitzinger (United States) Cooper MacNeil | Porsche 3.8L Flat-6 | 689 |
| 29 | GT | 26 | (United States) NGT Motorsport | (Venezuela) Henrique Cisneros (United Kingdom) Sean Edwards (United States) Carlos Kauffmann (United Kingdom) Nick Tandy | Porsche 997 GT3 Cup | 688 |
| 29 | GT | 26 | (United States) NGT Motorsport | (Venezuela) Henrique Cisneros (United Kingdom) Sean Edwards (United States) Carlos Kauffmann (United Kingdom) Nick Tandy | Porsche 3.8L Flat-6 | 688 |
| 30 | GT | 64 | (United States) The Racer's Group | (Venezuela) Gaetano Ardagna (Chile) Eduardo Costabal (Venezuela) Emilio Di Guida (Colombia) Santiago Orjuela (Chile) Eliseo Salazar | Porsche 997 GT3 Cup | 688 |
| 30 | GT | 64 | (United States) The Racer's Group | (Venezuela) Gaetano Ardagna (Chile) Eduardo Costabal (Venezuela) Emilio Di Guida (Colombia) Santiago Orjuela (Chile) Eliseo Salazar | Porsche 3.8L Flat-6 | 688 |
| 31 | GT | 22 | (United States) Bullet Racing | (United States) Randy Blaylock (Hong Kong) Darryl O'Young (United States) Kevin Roush (Canada) Brett Van Blankers (United States) Joe White | Porsche 997 GT3 Cup | 681 |
| 31 | GT | 22 | (United States) Bullet Racing | (United States) Randy Blaylock (Hong Kong) Darryl O'Young (United States) Kevin Roush (Canada) Brett Van Blankers (United States) Joe White | Porsche 3.8L Flat-6 | 681 |
| 32 | DP | 50 | (United States) Predator/Alegra | (United States) Byron DeFoor (United States) Elliott Forbes-Robinson (United Kingdom) Brian Johnson (United States) Jim Pace (United States) Carlos de Quesada | Riley Mk. XI | 672 |
| 32 | DP | 50 | (United States) Predator/Alegra | (United States) Byron DeFoor (United States) Elliott Forbes-Robinson (United Kingdom) Brian Johnson (United States) Jim Pace (United States) Carlos de Quesada | BMW 5.0L V8 | 672 |
| 33 | DP | 99 | (United States) GAINSCO/Bob Stallings Racing | (United States) Jon Fogarty (United States) Memo Gidley (United States) Alex Gurney | Corvette DP (Riley XXVI) | 672 |
| 33 | DP | 99 | (United States) GAINSCO/Bob Stallings Racing | (United States) Jon Fogarty (United States) Memo Gidley (United States) Alex Gurney | Chevrolet 5.0L V8 | 672 |
| 34 | GT | 82 | (United States) Dick Greer Racing | (United States) John Fergus (United States) John Finger (United States) Dick Greer (United States) Mark Hotchkis (United States) Owen Trinkler | Porsche 997 GT3 Cup | 665 |
| 34 | GT | 82 | (United States) Dick Greer Racing | (United States) John Fergus (United States) John Finger (United States) Dick Greer (United States) Mark Hotchkis (United States) Owen Trinkler | Porsche 3.8L Flat-6 | 665 |
| 35 | GT | 56 | (United States) AF - Waltrip | (Portugal) Rui Águas (United States) Robert Kauffman (United States) Travis Pastrana (United States) Michael Waltrip | Ferrari 458 Italia | 645 |
| 35 | GT | 56 | (United States) AF - Waltrip | (Portugal) Rui Águas (United States) Robert Kauffman (United States) Travis Pastrana (United States) Michael Waltrip | Ferrari 4.5L V8 | 645 |
| 36 | GT | 65 | (United States) The Racer's Group | (Italy) Joe Castellano (United States) Spencer Cox (United States) Mike Hedlund (United States) Jack McCarthy (United States) Jim Michaelian | Porsche 997 GT3 Cup | 643 |
| 36 | GT | 65 | (United States) The Racer's Group | (Italy) Joe Castellano (United States) Spencer Cox (United States) Mike Hedlund (United States) Jack McCarthy (United States) Jim Michaelian | Porsche 3.8L Flat-6 | 643 |
| 37 | GT | 68 | (United States) The Racer's Group | (Canada) Chris Cumming (France) Kévin Estre (Republic of Ireland) Damien Faulkner (Colombia) Carlos Gómez (United States) Ben Keating | Porsche 997 GT3 Cup | 640 |
| 37 | GT | 68 | (United States) The Racer's Group | (Canada) Chris Cumming (France) Kévin Estre (Republic of Ireland) Damien Faulkner (Colombia) Carlos Gómez (United States) Ben Keating | Porsche 3.8L Flat-6 | 640 |
| 38 DNF | GT | 55 | (United States) Acumen Motorsport | (United States) Frank Del Vecchio (United States) Doug Grunnet (United States) Tony Kester (United States) Scott McKee (United States) Randy Pobst | Porsche 997 GT3 Cup | 626 |
| 38 DNF | GT | 55 | (United States) Acumen Motorsport | (United States) Frank Del Vecchio (United States) Doug Grunnet (United States) Tony Kester (United States) Scott McKee (United States) Randy Pobst | Porsche 3.8L Flat-6 | 626 |
| 39 | GT | 18 | (Belgium) Mühlner Motorsports America | (United States) Davy Jones (United States) Bill Lester (United States) John McCutchen (Canada) Mark Thomas | Porsche 997 GT3 Cup | 609 |
| 39 | GT | 18 | (Belgium) Mühlner Motorsports America | (United States) Davy Jones (United States) Bill Lester (United States) John McCutchen (Canada) Mark Thomas | Porsche 3.8L Flat-6 | 609 |
| 40 | GT | 41 | (United States) Dempsey Racing | (United Kingdom) Ian James (United States) Rick Johnson (United States) Don Kitch Jr. (Canada) Scott Maxwell (United States) Dan Rogers | Mazda RX-8 | 608 |
| 40 | GT | 41 | (United States) Dempsey Racing | (United Kingdom) Ian James (United States) Rick Johnson (United States) Don Kitch Jr. (Canada) Scott Maxwell (United States) Dan Rogers | Mazda 2.0L 3-Rotor | 608 |
| 41 | GT | 12 | (United States) Alliance Autosport | (United States) Jon Miller (United States) Hal Prewitt (United States) Scott Rettich (United States) Matt Schneider (United States) Darryl Shoff | Porsche 997 GT3 Cup | 604 |
| 41 | GT | 12 | (United States) Alliance Autosport | (United States) Jon Miller (United States) Hal Prewitt (United States) Scott Rettich (United States) Matt Schneider (United States) Darryl Shoff | Porsche 3.8L Flat-6 | 604 |
| 42 | GT | 19 | (Belgium) Mühlner Motorsports America | (United States) Scott Dollahite (United States) Ian Nater (United States) Rhett O'Doski (Germany) Marco Seefried (United States) Derek Whitis | Porsche 997 GT3 Cup | 599 |
| 42 | GT | 19 | (Belgium) Mühlner Motorsports America | (United States) Scott Dollahite (United States) Ian Nater (United States) Rhett O'Doski (Germany) Marco Seefried (United States) Derek Whitis | Porsche 3.8L Flat-6 | 599 |
| 43 DNF | GT | 75 | (United States) Stevenson Motorsports | (United States) Matt Bell (United States) Al Carter (United States) Eric Curran (United States) Hugh Plumb | Chevrolet Camaro GT.R | 577 |
| 43 DNF | GT | 75 | (United States) Stevenson Motorsports | (United States) Matt Bell (United States) Al Carter (United States) Eric Curran (United States) Hugh Plumb | Chevrolet 6.0L V8 | 577 |
| 44 | GT | 51 | (United States) APR Motorsport | (United States) Ian Baas (Venezuela) Nelson Canache Jr. (United States) Jim Norman (Italy) Emanuele Pirro (South Africa) Dion von Moltke | Audi R8 | 447 |
| 44 | GT | 51 | (United States) APR Motorsport | (United States) Ian Baas (Venezuela) Nelson Canache Jr. (United States) Jim Norman (Italy) Emanuele Pirro (South Africa) Dion von Moltke | Audi 5.2L V10 | 447 |
| 45 | GT | 74 | (United States) Oryx Racing | (United Arab Emirates) Humaid Al Masaood (United Arab Emirates) Saeed Al Mehairi (United Kingdom) Steven Kane | Audi R8 | 202 |
| 45 | GT | 74 | (United States) Oryx Racing | (United Arab Emirates) Humaid Al Masaood (United Arab Emirates) Saeed Al Mehairi (United Kingdom) Steven Kane | Audi 5.2L V10 | 202 |
| 46 | GT | 17 | (United States) Burtin Racing with Goldcrest Motorsports | (Germany) Sebastian Asch (United States) Jack Baldwin (Argentina) Claudio Burtin (Austria) Martin Ragginger (United States) Bryan Sellers | Porsche 997 GT3 Cup | 424 |
| 46 | GT | 17 | (United States) Burtin Racing with Goldcrest Motorsports | (Germany) Sebastian Asch (United States) Jack Baldwin (Argentina) Claudio Burtin (Austria) Martin Ragginger (United States) Bryan Sellers | Porsche 3.8L Flat-6 | 424 |
| 47 DNF | GT | 20 | (United States) Liqui Moly Team Engstler/Mitchum Motorsports | (United States) Jade Buford (Germany) Franz Engstler (United States) David Murry (United States) Gunter Schaldach | Porsche 997 GT3 Cup | 416 |
| 47 DNF | GT | 20 | (United States) Liqui Moly Team Engstler/Mitchum Motorsports | (United States) Jade Buford (Germany) Franz Engstler (United States) David Murry (United States) Gunter Schaldach | Porsche 3.8L Flat-6 | 416 |
| 48 DNF | GT | 34 | (United States) Orbit Racing/GMG | (United States) Michael DeFontes (United States) Phil Fogg (Slovakia) Miro Konôpka (Czech Republic) Jan Vonka (Netherlands) Ronald van de Laar | Porsche 997 GT3 Cup | 383 |
| 48 DNF | GT | 34 | (United States) Orbit Racing/GMG | (United States) Michael DeFontes (United States) Phil Fogg (Slovakia) Miro Konôpka (Czech Republic) Jan Vonka (Netherlands) Ronald van de Laar | Porsche 3.8L Flat-6 | 383 |
| 49 | GT | 4 | (United States) Magnus Racing | (United Kingdom) Justin Bell (United States) Ryan Eversley (United States) Daniel Graeff (United States) Ron Yarab Jr. | Porsche 997 GT3 Cup | 310 |
| 49 | GT | 4 | (United States) Magnus Racing | (United Kingdom) Justin Bell (United States) Ryan Eversley (United States) Daniel Graeff (United States) Ron Yarab Jr. | Porsche 3.8L Flat-6 | 310 |
| 50 DNF | GT | 36 | (United States) Yellow Dragon Motorsports | (United States) Jarett Andretti (United States) John Andretti (Canada) Taylor Hacquard (Norway) Anders Krohn | Mazda RX-8 | 270 |
| 50 DNF | GT | 36 | (United States) Yellow Dragon Motorsports | (United States) Jarett Andretti (United States) John Andretti (Canada) Taylor Hacquard (Norway) Anders Krohn | Mazda 2.0L 3-Rotor | 270 |
| 51 DNF | GT | 15 | (United States) Rick Ware Racing | (United States) Chris Cook (United States) Jeffrey Earnhardt (United States) Doug Harrington (United States) Timmy Hill (United States) John Ware Jr. | Ford Mustang | 256 |
| 51 DNF | GT | 15 | (United States) Rick Ware Racing | (United States) Chris Cook (United States) Jeffrey Earnhardt (United States) Doug Harrington (United States) Timmy Hill (United States) John Ware Jr. | Ford 5.0L V8 | 256 |
| 52 DNF | GT | 48 | (United States) Paul Miller Racing | (United Kingdom) Rob Bell (Germany) Sascha Maassen (United States) Bryce Miller (Canada) Mark Wilkins | Porsche 997 GT3 Cup | 224 |
| 52 DNF | GT | 48 | (United States) Paul Miller Racing | (United Kingdom) Rob Bell (Germany) Sascha Maassen (United States) Bryce Miller (Canada) Mark Wilkins | Porsche 3.8L Flat-6 | 224 |
| 53 DNF | GT | 46 | (United States) Michael Baughman Racing | (United States) Michael Baughman (Netherlands) Ivo Breukers (Belgium) Armand Fumal (United States) Ray Mason (United States) Jeff Nowicki | Chevrolet Corvette | 172 |
| 53 DNF | GT | 46 | (United States) Michael Baughman Racing | (United States) Michael Baughman (Netherlands) Ivo Breukers (Belgium) Armand Fumal (United States) Ray Mason (United States) Jeff Nowicki | Chevrolet 6.2L V8 | 172 |
| 54 DNF | GT | 62 | (United States) Risi Competizione | (Italy) Gianmaria Bruni (Italy) Giancarlo Fisichella (Brazil) Raphael Matos | Ferrari 458 Italia | 154 |
| 54 DNF | GT | 62 | (United States) Risi Competizione | (Italy) Gianmaria Bruni (Italy) Giancarlo Fisichella (Brazil) Raphael Matos | Ferrari 4.5L V8 | 154 |
| 55 DNF | GT | 87 | (United States) Racer's Edge Motorsports | (United States) Tony Ave (Belgium) Jan Heylen (United States) Doug Peterson (Belgium) Maxime Soulet (Costa Rica) Emilio Valverde | Dodge Viper | 101 |
| 55 DNF | GT | 87 | (United States) Racer's Edge Motorsports | (United States) Tony Ave (Belgium) Jan Heylen (United States) Doug Peterson (Belgium) Maxime Soulet (Costa Rica) Emilio Valverde | Dodge 8.0L V10 | 101 |
| 56 DNF | GT | 94 | (United States) Turner Motorsport | (United States) Bill Auberlen (Canada) Paul Dalla Lana (United States) Billy Johnson (Germany) Dirk Müller (United States) Boris Said | BMW M3 | 86 |
| 56 DNF | GT | 94 | (United States) Turner Motorsport | (United States) Bill Auberlen (Canada) Paul Dalla Lana (United States) Billy Johnson (Germany) Dirk Müller (United States) Boris Said | BMW 5.0L V8 | 86 |
| 57 DNF | GT | 43 | (United States) Team Sahlen | (United States) Joe Nonnamaker (United States) Wayne Nonnamaker (United States) Will Nonnamaker | Mazda RX-8 | 21 |
| 57 DNF | GT | 43 | (United States) Team Sahlen | (United States) Joe Nonnamaker (United States) Wayne Nonnamaker (United States) Will Nonnamaker | Mazda 2.0L 3-Rotor | 21 |
| 58 DNF | DP | 10 | (United States) SunTrust Racing | (Italy) Max Angelelli (Australia) Ryan Briscoe (United States) Ricky Taylor | Corvette DP (Dallara DP01) | 14 |
| 58 DNF | DP | 10 | (United States) SunTrust Racing | (Italy) Max Angelelli (Australia) Ryan Briscoe (United States) Ricky Taylor | Chevrolet 5.0L V8 | 14 |

Rolex Sports Car Series
| Previous race: None | 2012 season | Next race: Porsche 250 |
