= 2013 24 Hours of Daytona =

51st Daytona 24 hours

Previous: 2012	Next: 2014
Index: Races | Winners

The Daytona International Speedway road course (2003-present)

The 2013 Rolex 24 at Daytona was a long-distance motor race for sports cars conforming to the regulations of the Grand-Am Road Racing series. The 51st edition was raced between January 26 and 27. Michael Shank Racing is the defending champion in DP class and Magnus Racing in GT class. It was also the debut of the GX class for "purpose built, series produced and modified replicas of series produced automobiles that are not eligible for the GT class." It was the last time the 24 Hours of Daytona was part of the Rolex Sports Car Series.

== The "Roar Before the Rolex 24" ==
Canadian driver Michael Valiante made the fastest lap of the "Roar" in the final session (1:42.058). Valiante raced in the #6 Ford/Riley of Michael Shank Racing. Dane Cameron in the Sahlen's #42 BMW/Riley set the second time in 1:42.101. In the GT the #73 Porsche GT3 was the fastest and clocked a 1:48.569. Shane Lewis was the fastest in the new GX category. 1:56.167 was the time for Lewis in a Porsche Cayman.

Session	Day	DP			GT			GX		
Session	Day	Car	Drivers	Best Time	Car	Drivers	Best Time	Car	Drivers	Best Time
1	January 4	#02 Chip Ganassi Racing with Felix Sabates; Riley-BMW	(New Zealand) Scott Dixon (United Kingdom) Dario Franchitti (United States) Joey Hand (United States) Jamie McMurray	2:01.852	#32 Konrad Motorsport/Orbit Racing; Porsche GT3	(Denmark) Michael Christensen (Germany) Christian Engelhart (United Kingdom) Nick Tandy	2:05.183	#38 BGB Motorsports; Porsche Cayman	(United States) Lee Davis (United States) Ryan Eversley (United States) Eric Foss (United States) Jeff Mosing	2:13.408
2	January 4	#60 Michael Shank Racing; Riley-Ford	(United States) A. J. Allmendinger (Australia) Marcos Ambrose (Brazil) Oswaldo Negri Jr. (United States) John Pew (United Kingdom) Justin Wilson	1:42.918	#44 Magnus Racing; Porsche GT3	(France) Nicolas Armindo (United States) Andy Lally (Austria) Richard Lietz (United States) John Potter	1:49.322	#16 Napleton Racing; Porsche Cayman	(Venezuela) Nelson Canache Jr. (United States) David Donohue (United States) Shane Lewis (United States) Jim Norman	1:57.466
3	January 5	#42 Team Sahlen; Riley-BMW	(United States) Dane Cameron (United States) Wayne Nonnamaker	1:42.101	#73 Park Place Motorsports; Porsche GT3	(United States) Daniel Graeff (United States) Jason Hart (United States) Patrick Lindsey (United States) Patrick Long (United States) Spencer Pumpelly	1:48.569	#16 Napleton Racing; Porsche Cayman	(Venezuela) Nelson Canache Jr. (United States) David Donohue (United States) Shane Lewis (United States) Jim Norman	1:56.167
4	January 5	#6 Michael Shank Racing; Riley-Ford	(Canada) Chris Cumming (Venezuela) Jorge Goncalvez (Canada) Michael Valiante (Colombia) Gustavo Yacamán	1:42.160	#44 Magnus Racing; Porsche GT3	(France) Nicolas Armindo (United States) Andy Lally (Austria) Richard Lietz (United States) John Potter	1:49.128	#16 Napleton Racing; Porsche Cayman	(Venezuela) Nelson Canache Jr. (United States) David Donohue (United States) Shane Lewis (United States) Jim Norman	1:56.451
5	January 5	#60 Michael Shank Racing; Riley-Ford	(United States) A. J. Allmendinger (Australia) Marcos Ambrose (Brazil) Oswaldo Negri Jr. (United States) John Pew (United Kingdom) Justin Wilson	1:42.296	#32 Konrad Motorsport/Orbit Racing; Porsche GT3	(Denmark) Michael Christensen (Germany) Christian Engelhart (United Kingdom) Nick Tandy	1:49.420	#16 Napleton Racing; Porsche Cayman	(Venezuela) Nelson Canache Jr. (United States) David Donohue (United States) Shane Lewis (United States) Jim Norman	1:56.222
6	January 5	#2 Starworks Motorsport; Riley-Ford	(France) Sébastien Bourdais (United Kingdom) Ryan Dalziel (United Kingdom) Allan McNish (Venezuela) Alex Popow	1:42.644	#32 Konrad Motorsport/Orbit Racing; Porsche GT3	(Denmark) Michael Christensen (Germany) Christian Engelhart (United Kingdom) Nick Tandy	1:49.090	#16 Napleton Racing; Porsche Cayman	(Venezuela) Nelson Canache Jr. (United States) David Donohue (United States) Shane Lewis (United States) Jim Norman	1:56.401
7	January 6	#6 Michael Shank Racing; Riley-Ford	(Canada) Chris Cumming (Venezuela) Jorge Goncalvez (Canada) Michael Valiante (Colombia) Gustavo Yacamán	1:42.058	#45 Magnus Racing; Porsche GT3	(United States) Mark Boden (United States) Al Carter (United States) Charles Espenlaub (United States) Hugh Plumb (United States) Charles Putman	1:49.592	#38 BGB Motorsports; Porsche Cayman	(United States) Lee Davis (United States) Ryan Eversley (United States) Eric Foss (United States) Jeff Mosing	1:56.492
8	January 6	#6 Michael Shank Racing; Riley-Ford	(Canada) Chris Cumming (Venezuela) Jorge Goncalvez (Canada) Michael Valiante (Colombia) Gustavo Yacamán	1:42.488	#23 Alex Job Racing; Porsche GT3	(Netherlands) Jeroen Bleekemolen (Republic of Ireland) Damien Faulkner (Germany) Marco Holzer (United States) Cooper MacNeil	1:49.812	#16 Napleton Racing; Porsche Cayman	(Venezuela) Nelson Canache Jr. (United States) David Donohue (United States) Shane Lewis (United States) Jim Norman	1:56.399

== Qualifying ==
The qualifying was performed this Thursday, 24. DP session started at 15:40 EST and finished at 15:55 ET. GT and GX qualified between 16:10 ET and 16:25 ET.

Scott Pruett took the pole position in the #01 Chip Ganassi Racing with Felix Sabates Riley-BMW. Nick Tandy in the GT performed the fastest lap in a Porsche GT3. Shane Lewis made the first pole in the GX category with a Porsche Cayman.

Pole positions in each class are denoted in bold.

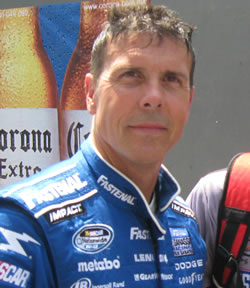
Scott Pruett won the pole position

Pos	No.	Team	Car	Class	Qualifying	Gap	Grid
1	**01**	**Chip Ganassi Racing with Felix Sabates**	**Riley / BMW**	**DP**	**1:40.553**		**1**
2	02	Chip Ganassi Racing with Felix Sabates	Riley / BMW	DP	1:40.646	+0.093	2
3	42	Team Sahlen	Riley / BMW	DP	1:41.213	+0.660	3
4	6	Michael Shank Racing	Riley / Ford	DP	1:41.236	+0.683	4
5	90	Spirit of Daytona Racing	Corvette	DP	1:41.844	+1.291	5
6	60	Michael Shank Racing	Riley / Ford	DP	1:41.905	+1.352	6
7	2	Starworks with Alex Popow	Riley / Ford	DP	1:41.920	+1.367	4
8	99	GAINSCO/Bob Stallings Racing	Corvette	DP	1:42.032	+1.479	8
9	3	8 Star Motorsports	Corvette	DP	1:42.160	+1.607	9
10	50	Highway to Help	Riley / BMW	DP	1:42.205	+1.652	10
11	5	Action Express Racing	Corvette	DP	1:42.392	+1.839	11
12	10	Wayne Taylor Racing	Corvette	DP	1:42.547	+1.994	12
13	9	Action Express Racing	Corvette	DP	1:42.749	+2.196	13
14	77	Doran Racing	Dallara / Ford	DP	1:42.869	+2.316	14
15	8	Starworks Motorsport	Riley / Ford	DP	1:43.291	+2.738	15
16	43	Team Sahlen	Riley / BMW	DP	1:45.370	+4.817	16
17	**32**	**Konrad Motorsport/Orbit Racing**	**Porsche GT3**	**GT**	**1:47.631**	**+7.078**	**17**
18	44	Magnus Racing	Porsche GT3	GT	1:47.828	+7.275	18
19	30	MOMO/NGT Motorsport	Porsche GT3	GT	1:48.007	+7.454	19
20	73	Park Place Motorsports	Porsche GT3	GT	1:48.137	+7.584	20
21	63	Scuderia Corsa	Ferrari 458	GT	1:48.260	+7.707	21
22	24	Audi Sport Customer Racing/Alex Job Racing	Audi R8 Grand-Am	GT	1:48.282	+7.729	22
23	62	Snow Racing/Wright Motorsports	Porsche GT3	GT	1:48.319	+7.766	23
24	57	Stevenson Motorsports	Camaro GT-R	GT	1:48.330	+7.777	24
25	64	Scuderia Corsa	Ferrari 458	GT	1:48.521	+7.968	25
26	69	AIM Autosport Team FXDD with Ferrari	Ferrari 458	GT	1:48.577	+8.024	26
27	52	Audi Sport Customer Racing/APR Motorsport Ltd. UK	Audi R8 Grand-Am	GT	1:48.581	+8.028	27
28	61	R. Ferri/AIM Motorsport Racing with Ferrari	Ferrari 458	GT	1:48.643	+8.090	28
29	66	The Racer's Group	Porsche GT3	GT	1:48.643	+8.090	29
30	59	Brumos Racing	Porsche GT3	GT	1:48.711	+8.158	30
31	23	Alex Job Racing	Porsche GT3	GT	1:48.716	+8.163	31
32	13	Audi Sport Customer Racing/Rum Bum Racing	Audi R8 Grand-Am	GT	1:48.865	+8.212	32
33	56	AF - Waltrip	Ferrari 458	GT	1:49.065	+8.512	33
34	93	Turner Motorsport	BMW M3	GT	1:49.067	+8.514	34
35	45	Magnus Racing	Porsche GT3	GT	1:49.304	+8.751	35
36	67	The Racer's Group	Porsche GT3	GT	1:49.611	+9.058	36
37	87	Vehicle Technologies	SRT Viper	GT	1:49.612	+9.059	37
38	94	Turner Motorsport	BMW M3	GT	1:49.719	+9.166	38
39	31	Marsh Racing	Corvette	GT	1:49.827	+9.274	39
40	18	Mühlner Motorsports America	Porsche GT3	GT	1:49.850	+9.297	40
41	21	Dener Motorsport	Porsche GT3	GT	1:49.924	+9.371	41
42	03	Extreme Speed Motorsports	Ferrari 458	GT	1:49.936	+9.383	42
43	51	APR Motorsport Ltd. UK	Ferrari 458	GT	1:49.937	+9.384	43
44	80	TruSpeed Motorsports	Porsche GT3	GT	1:50.502	+9.949	44
45	20	Dener Motorsport	Porsche GT3	GT	1:50.823	+10.270	45

== The race ==
The race started at 3:30 (EST) on Saturday, January 26, 2013, and ended at 3:30 (EST) on Sunday, January 27, 2013. The first two hours were dominated by #01 Chip Ganassi, driven by Scott Pruett.

This race had the first mother/son pairing in the race's history as Utah native Madison Snow teamed with his mother, Melanie.

== Race results ==
Class winners in bold.

Pos.	Class	No.	Team	Drivers	Chassis	Laps
Pos.	Class	No.	Team	Drivers	Engine	Laps
1	**DP**	**01**	**(United States) Chip Ganassi Racing with Felix Sabates**	**(United States) Charlie Kimball (Colombia) Juan Pablo Montoya (United States) Scott Pruett (Mexico) Memo Rojas**	**Riley Mk. XXVI**	**709**
1	**DP**	**01**	**(United States) Chip Ganassi Racing with Felix Sabates**	**(United States) Charlie Kimball (Colombia) Juan Pablo Montoya (United States) Scott Pruett (Mexico) Memo Rojas**	**BMW 5.0L V8**	**709**
2	DP	10	(United States) Wayne Taylor Racing	(Italy) Max Angelelli (United States) Ryan Hunter-Reay (United States) Jordan Taylor	Corvette DP (Dallara)	709
2	DP	10	(United States) Wayne Taylor Racing	(Italy) Max Angelelli (United States) Ryan Hunter-Reay (United States) Jordan Taylor	Chevrolet 5.0L V8	709
3	DP	60	(United States) Michael Shank Racing	(United States) A. J. Allmendinger (Australia) Marcos Ambrose (Brazil) Oswaldo Negri Jr. (United States) John Pew (United Kingdom) Justin Wilson	Riley Mk. XXVI	709
3	DP	60	(United States) Michael Shank Racing	(United States) A. J. Allmendinger (Australia) Marcos Ambrose (Brazil) Oswaldo Negri Jr. (United States) John Pew (United Kingdom) Justin Wilson	Ford 5.0L V8	709
4	DP	9	(United States) Action Express Racing	(Portugal) João Barbosa (Brazil) Christian Fittipaldi (United States) Burt Frisselle (Germany) Mike Rockenfeller	Corvette DP (Coyote)	708
4	DP	9	(United States) Action Express Racing	(Portugal) João Barbosa (Brazil) Christian Fittipaldi (United States) Burt Frisselle (Germany) Mike Rockenfeller	Chevrolet 5.0L V8	708
5	DP	90	(United States) Spirit of Daytona Racing	(Spain) Antonio García (United Kingdom) Oliver Gavin (United States) Ricky Taylor (United Kingdom) Richard Westbrook	Corvette DP (Coyote)	697
5	DP	90	(United States) Spirit of Daytona Racing	(Spain) Antonio García (United Kingdom) Oliver Gavin (United States) Ricky Taylor (United Kingdom) Richard Westbrook	Chevrolet 5.0L V8	697
6	DP	2	(United States) Starworks with Alex Popow	(France) Sébastien Bourdais (United Kingdom) Ryan Dalziel (United Kingdom) Allan McNish (Venezuela) Alex Popow	Riley Mk. XXVI	696
6	DP	2	(United States) Starworks with Alex Popow	(France) Sébastien Bourdais (United Kingdom) Ryan Dalziel (United Kingdom) Allan McNish (Venezuela) Alex Popow	Ford 5.0L V8	696
7	DP	99	(United States) GAINSCO/Bob Stallings Racing	(United States) Jon Fogarty (United States) Memo Gidley (United States) Alex Gurney (United States) Darren Law	Corvette DP (Riley XXVI)	695
7	DP	99	(United States) GAINSCO/Bob Stallings Racing	(United States) Jon Fogarty (United States) Memo Gidley (United States) Alex Gurney (United States) Darren Law	Chevrolet 5.0L V8	695
8	DP	5	(United States) Action Express Racing	(Portugal) João Barbosa (Brazil) Christian Fittipaldi (United States) Brian Frisselle (Brazil) Felipe Nasr (Brazil) Nelson Piquet Jr.	Corvette DP (Coyote)	688
8	DP	5	(United States) Action Express Racing	(Portugal) João Barbosa (Brazil) Christian Fittipaldi (United States) Brian Frisselle (Brazil) Felipe Nasr (Brazil) Nelson Piquet Jr.	Chevrolet 5.0L V8	688
9	**GT**	**24**	**(United States) Audi Sport Customer Racing/Alex Job Racing**	**(Portugal) Filipe Albuquerque (United Kingdom) Oliver Jarvis (Italy) Edoardo Mortara (South Africa) Dion von Moltke**	**Audi R8**	**678**
9	**GT**	**24**	**(United States) Audi Sport Customer Racing/Alex Job Racing**	**(Portugal) Filipe Albuquerque (United Kingdom) Oliver Jarvis (Italy) Edoardo Mortara (South Africa) Dion von Moltke**	**Audi 5.2L V10**	**678**
10	GT	52	(United Kingdom) Audi Sport Customer Racing/APR Motorsport Ltd. UK	(United States) Ian Baas (Germany) Marc Basseng (Germany) René Rast (Germany) Frank Stippler	Audi R8	678
10	GT	52	(United Kingdom) Audi Sport Customer Racing/APR Motorsport Ltd. UK	(United States) Ian Baas (Germany) Marc Basseng (Germany) René Rast (Germany) Frank Stippler	Audi 5.2L V10	678
11	GT	69	(United States) AIM Autosport Team FXDD with Ferrari	(United States) Emil Assentato (United States) Craig Stanton (United States) Anthony Lazzaro (United States) Nick Longhi (Canada) Mark Wilkins	Ferrari 458 Italia Grand-Am	678
11	GT	69	(United States) AIM Autosport Team FXDD with Ferrari	(United States) Emil Assentato (United States) Craig Stanton (United States) Anthony Lazzaro (United States) Nick Longhi (Canada) Mark Wilkins	Ferrari 4.5L V8	678
12	GT	63	(United States) Scuderia Corsa	(Italy) Alessandro Balzan (Monaco) Olivier Beretta (Italy) Marco Frezza (Italy) Alessandro Pier Guidi	Ferrari 458 Italia Grand-Am	678
12	GT	63	(United States) Scuderia Corsa	(Italy) Alessandro Balzan (Monaco) Olivier Beretta (Italy) Marco Frezza (Italy) Alessandro Pier Guidi	Ferrari 4.5L V8	678
13	GT	44	(United States) Magnus Racing	(France) Nicolas Armindo (United States) Andy Lally (Austria) Richard Lietz (United States) John Potter	Porsche 911 GT3 Cup	678
13	GT	44	(United States) Magnus Racing	(France) Nicolas Armindo (United States) Andy Lally (Austria) Richard Lietz (United States) John Potter	Porsche 4.0L F6	678
14	GT	23	(United States) Alex Job Racing	(Netherlands) Jeroen Bleekemolen (Republic of Ireland) Damien Faulkner (Germany) Marco Holzer (United States) Cooper MacNeil	Porsche 911 GT3 Cup	678
14	GT	23	(United States) Alex Job Racing	(Netherlands) Jeroen Bleekemolen (Republic of Ireland) Damien Faulkner (Germany) Marco Holzer (United States) Cooper MacNeil	Porsche 4.0L F6	678
15	GT	13	(United States) Audi Sport Customer Racing/Rum Bum Racing	(Germany) Frank Biela (Germany) Christopher Haase (United States) Matt Plumb (Germany) Markus Winkelhock	Audi R8	677
15	GT	13	(United States) Audi Sport Customer Racing/Rum Bum Racing	(Germany) Frank Biela (Germany) Christopher Haase (United States) Matt Plumb (Germany) Markus Winkelhock	Audi 5.2L V10	677
16	GT	56	(United States) AF - Waltrip	(Portugal) Rui Águas (United States) Clint Bowyer (United States) Robert Kauffman (United States) Michael Waltrip	Ferrari 458 Italia Grand-Am	677
16	GT	56	(United States) AF - Waltrip	(Portugal) Rui Águas (United States) Clint Bowyer (United States) Robert Kauffman (United States) Michael Waltrip	Ferrari 4.5L V8	677
17	GT	03	(United States) Extreme Speed Motorsports	(United States) Ed Brown (United States) Mike Hedlund (United States) Scott Sharp (United States) Johannes van Overbeek	Ferrari 458 Italia Grand-Am	673
17	GT	03	(United States) Extreme Speed Motorsports	(United States) Ed Brown (United States) Mike Hedlund (United States) Scott Sharp (United States) Johannes van Overbeek	Ferrari 4.5L V8	673
18	GT	17	(United States) Burtin Racing with Goldcrest Motorsports	(United States) Jack Baldwin (Argentina) Claudio Burtin (Germany) Mario Farnbacher (Austria) Martin Ragginger (Germany) Robert Renauer	Porsche 911 GT3 Cup	672
18	GT	17	(United States) Burtin Racing with Goldcrest Motorsports	(United States) Jack Baldwin (Argentina) Claudio Burtin (Germany) Mario Farnbacher (Austria) Martin Ragginger (Germany) Robert Renauer	Porsche 4.0L F6	672
19	GT	62	(United States) Snow Racing/Wright Motorsports	(Austria) Klaus Bachler (Germany) Sascha Maassen (Germany) Marco Seefried (United States) Madison Snow (United States) Melanie Snow	Porsche 911 GT3 Cup	668
19	GT	62	(United States) Snow Racing/Wright Motorsports	(Austria) Klaus Bachler (Germany) Sascha Maassen (Germany) Marco Seefried (United States) Madison Snow (United States) Melanie Snow	Porsche 4.0L F6	668
20	GT	51	(United Kingdom) APR Motorsport Ltd. UK	(United States) Matt Bell (Canada) David Empringham (Canada) John Farano (United States) Alex Figge (Canada) Dave Lacey	Audi R8	667
20	GT	51	(United Kingdom) APR Motorsport Ltd. UK	(United States) Matt Bell (Canada) David Empringham (Canada) John Farano (United States) Alex Figge (Canada) Dave Lacey	Audi 5.2L V10	667
21	DP	42	(United States) Team Sahlen	(United States) Dane Cameron (Brazil) Bruno Junqueira (United States) Wayne Nonnamaker (France) Simon Pagenaud	Riley Mk. XXVI	664
21	DP	42	(United States) Team Sahlen	(United States) Dane Cameron (Brazil) Bruno Junqueira (United States) Wayne Nonnamaker (France) Simon Pagenaud	BMW 5.0L V8	664
22 DNF	GT	59	(United States) Brumos Racing	(United States) Andrew Davis (United States) Leh Keen (Germany) Marc Lieb (United States) Bryan Sellers	Porsche 911 GT3 Cup	663
22 DNF	GT	59	(United States) Brumos Racing	(United States) Andrew Davis (United States) Leh Keen (Germany) Marc Lieb (United States) Bryan Sellers	Porsche 4.0L F6	663
23	GT	72	(United States) Park Place Motorsports	(United States) Chuck Cole (Canada) Jean-François Dumoulin (United States) Grant Phipps (United States) Mike Skeen (United States) Mike Vess	Porsche 911 GT3 Cup	657
23	GT	72	(United States) Park Place Motorsports	(United States) Chuck Cole (Canada) Jean-François Dumoulin (United States) Grant Phipps (United States) Mike Skeen (United States) Mike Vess	Porsche 4.0L F6	657
24	GT	45	(United States) Magnus Racing	(United States) Mark Boden (United States) Al Carter (United States) Charles Espenlaub (United States) Hugh Plumb (United States) Charles Putman	Porsche 911 GT3 Cup	656
24	GT	45	(United States) Magnus Racing	(United States) Mark Boden (United States) Al Carter (United States) Charles Espenlaub (United States) Hugh Plumb (United States) Charles Putman	Porsche 4.0L F6	656
25	GT	73	(United States) Park Place Motorsports	(United States) Daniel Graeff (United States) Jason Hart (United States) Patrick Lindsey (United States) Patrick Long (United States) Spencer Pumpelly	Porsche 911 GT3 Cup	653
25	GT	73	(United States) Park Place Motorsports	(United States) Daniel Graeff (United States) Jason Hart (United States) Patrick Lindsey (United States) Patrick Long (United States) Spencer Pumpelly	**Porsche 4.0L F6**	653
26	**GX**	**16**	**(United States) Napleton Racing**	**(Venezuela) Nelson Canache Jr. (United States) David Donohue (United States) Shane Lewis (United States) Jim Norman**	**Porsche Cayman S**	**635**
26	**GX**	**16**	**(United States) Napleton Racing**	**(Venezuela) Nelson Canache Jr. (United States) David Donohue (United States) Shane Lewis (United States) Jim Norman**	**Porsche 3.8L F6**	**635**
27	GT	78	(United States) Racer's Edge Motorsports	(Mexico) Rudy Camarillo (Mexico) Martin Fuentes (Mexico) Carlos Peralta (Mexico) Ricardo Pérez de Lara	Mazda RX-8	634
27	GT	78	(United States) Racer's Edge Motorsports	(Mexico) Rudy Camarillo (Mexico) Martin Fuentes (Mexico) Carlos Peralta (Mexico) Ricardo Pérez de Lara	Mazda 2.0L 3-Rotor	634
28	GT	94	(United States) Turner Motorsport	(United States) Bill Auberlen (Canada) Paul Dalla Lana (United States) Billy Johnson (Belgium) Maxime Martin (United States) Boris Said	BMW M3	631
28	GT	94	(United States) Turner Motorsport	(United States) Bill Auberlen (Canada) Paul Dalla Lana (United States) Billy Johnson (Belgium) Maxime Martin (United States) Boris Said	BMW 5.0L V8	631
29	GT	80	(United States) TruSpeed Motorsports	(United States) Kelly Collins (United States) Phil Fogg (United States) Tom Haacker (United States) Jim Walsh	Porsche 911 GT3 Cup	627
29	GT	80	(United States) TruSpeed Motorsports	(United States) Kelly Collins (United States) Phil Fogg (United States) Tom Haacker (United States) Jim Walsh	Porsche 4.0L F6	627
30	GX	22	(United States) Bullet Racing	(United States) James Clay (Hong Kong) Darryl O'Young (United States) Daniel Rogers (United States) Seth Thomas (Canada) Karl Thomson	Porsche Cayman S	625
30	GX	22	(United States) Bullet Racing	(United States) James Clay (Hong Kong) Darryl O'Young (United States) Daniel Rogers (United States) Seth Thomas (Canada) Karl Thomson	Porsche 3.8L F6	625
31	GT	66	(United States) The Racer's Group	(Germany) Jörg Bergmeister (Germany) Dominik Farnbacher (United States) Ben Keating (Canada) Kuno Wittmer	Porsche 911 GT3 Cup	622
31	GT	66	(United States) The Racer's Group	(Germany) Jörg Bergmeister (Germany) Dominik Farnbacher (United States) Ben Keating (Canada) Kuno Wittmer	Porsche 4.0L F6	622
32 DNF	GT	61	(United States) R. Ferri/AIM Motorsport Racing with Ferrari	(Italy) Giancarlo Fisichella (Italy) Max Papis (United States) Jeff Segal (Finland) Toni Vilander	Ferrari 458 Italia Grand-Am	614
32 DNF	GT	61	(United States) R. Ferri/AIM Motorsport Racing with Ferrari	(Italy) Giancarlo Fisichella (Italy) Max Papis (United States) Jeff Segal (Finland) Toni Vilander	Ferrari 4.5L V8	614
33	GX	38	(United States) BGB Motorsports	(United States) Lee Davis (United States) Ryan Eversley (United States) Eric Foss (United States) Jeff Mosing (United States) John Tecce	Porsche Cayman GX.R	614
33	GX	38	(United States) BGB Motorsports	(United States) Lee Davis (United States) Ryan Eversley (United States) Eric Foss (United States) Jeff Mosing (United States) John Tecce	Porsche 3.8L F6	614
34 DNF	DP	3	(United States) 8 Star Motorsports	(United Kingdom) Anthony Davidson (Portugal) Pedro Lamy (France) Nicolas Minassian (Venezuela) Enzo Potolicchio (France) Stéphane Sarrazin	Corvette DP (Coyote)	612
34 DNF	DP	3	(United States) 8 Star Motorsports	(United Kingdom) Anthony Davidson (Portugal) Pedro Lamy (France) Nicolas Minassian (Venezuela) Enzo Potolicchio (France) Stéphane Sarrazin	Chevrolet 5.0L V8	612
35	GT	19	(Belgium) Mühlner Motorsports America	(Chile) Eduardo Costabal (Canada) Mark Thomas (Chile) Eliseo Salazar	Porsche 911 GT3 Cup	610
35	GT	19	(Belgium) Mühlner Motorsports America	(Chile) Eduardo Costabal (Canada) Mark Thomas (Chile) Eliseo Salazar	Porsche 4.0L F6	610
36 DNF	GT	57	(United States) Stevenson Motorsports	(United States) John Edwards (United Kingdom) Robin Liddell (Denmark) Jan Magnussen (United States) Tommy Milner	Chevrolet Camaro GT.R	595
36 DNF	GT	57	(United States) Stevenson Motorsports	(United States) John Edwards (United Kingdom) Robin Liddell (Denmark) Jan Magnussen (United States) Tommy Milner	Chevrolet 6.2L V8	595
37 DNF	DP	02	(United States) Chip Ganassi Racing with Felix Sabates	(New Zealand) Scott Dixon (United Kingdom) Dario Franchitti (United States) Joey Hand (United States) Jamie McMurray (United States) Scott Pruett	Riley Mk. XXVI	594
37 DNF	DP	02	(United States) Chip Ganassi Racing with Felix Sabates	(New Zealand) Scott Dixon (United Kingdom) Dario Franchitti (United States) Joey Hand (United States) Jamie McMurray (United States) Scott Pruett	BMW 5.0L V8	594
38	GT	64	(United States) Scuderia Corsa	(Brazil) Francisco Longo (Brazil) Raphael Matos (Brazil) Xandinho Negrão (Brazil) Daniel Serra	Ferrari 458 Italia Grand-Am	576
38	GT	64	(United States) Scuderia Corsa	(Brazil) Francisco Longo (Brazil) Raphael Matos (Brazil) Xandinho Negrão (Brazil) Daniel Serra	Ferrari 4.5L V8	576
39 DNF	GT	30	(United States) MOMO/NGT Motorsport	(Venezuela) Henrique Cisneros (United Kingdom) Sean Edwards (Poland) Kuba Giermaziak (France) Patrick Pilet	Porsche 911 GT3 Cup	535
39 DNF	GT	30	(United States) MOMO/NGT Motorsport	(Venezuela) Henrique Cisneros (United Kingdom) Sean Edwards (Poland) Kuba Giermaziak (France) Patrick Pilet	Porsche 4.0L F6	535
40 DNF	DP	50	(United States) Highway to Help	(United States) Frank Beck (United States) Carlos de Quesada (United States) Byron DeFoor (United Kingdom) Ian James (United States) Jim Pace	Riley Mk. XXVI	517
40 DNF	DP	50	(United States) Highway to Help	(United States) Frank Beck (United States) Carlos de Quesada (United States) Byron DeFoor (United Kingdom) Ian James (United States) Jim Pace	BMW 5.0L V8	517
41 DNF	DP	6	(United States) Michael Shank Racing	(Canada) Chris Cumming (Venezuela) Jorge Goncalvez (Canada) Michael Valiante (Colombia) Gustavo Yacamán	Riley Mk. XXVI	508
41 DNF	DP	6	(United States) Michael Shank Racing	(Canada) Chris Cumming (Venezuela) Jorge Goncalvez (Canada) Michael Valiante (Colombia) Gustavo Yacamán	Ford 5.0L V8	508
42 DNF	GT	67	(United States) The Racer's Group	(France) Emmanuel Collard (France) Romain Dumas (Sweden) Niclas Jönsson (United States) Tracy Krohn	Porsche 911 GT3 Cup	451
42 DNF	GT	67	(United States) The Racer's Group	(France) Emmanuel Collard (France) Romain Dumas (Sweden) Niclas Jönsson (United States) Tracy Krohn	Porsche 4.0L F6	451
43 DNF	DP	8	(United States) Starworks Motorsport	(Venezuela) Gaetano Ardagna (Italy) Ivan Bellarosa (New Zealand) Brendon Hartley (United States) Scott Mayer (Czech Republic) Jan Charouz	Riley Mk. XXVI	441
43 DNF	DP	8	(United States) Starworks Motorsport	(Venezuela) Gaetano Ardagna (Italy) Ivan Bellarosa (New Zealand) Brendon Hartley (United States) Scott Mayer (Czech Republic) Jan Charouz	Ford 5.0L V8	441
44 DNF	DP	43	(United States) Team Sahlen	(United States) Tomy Drissi (Brazil) Bruno Junqueira (United States) Joe Nonnamaker (United States) Will Nonnamaker (United States) Joe Sahlen	Riley Mk. XXVI	422
44 DNF	DP	43	(United States) Team Sahlen	(United States) Tomy Drissi (Brazil) Bruno Junqueira (United States) Joe Nonnamaker (United States) Will Nonnamaker (United States) Joe Sahlen	BMW 5.0L V8	422
45 DNF	GT	20	(United States) Dener Motorsport	(Brazil) Nonô Figueiredo (Brazil) Constantino Júnior (Brazil) Clemente Lunardi (Brazil) Ricardo Maurício (Brazil) Marcel Visconde	Porsche 911 GT3 Cup	386
45 DNF	GT	20	(United States) Dener Motorsport	(Brazil) Nonô Figueiredo (Brazil) Constantino Júnior (Brazil) Clemente Lunardi (Brazil) Ricardo Maurício (Brazil) Marcel Visconde	Porsche 4.0L F6	386
46 DNF	GT	21	(United States) Dener Motorsport	(Brazil) Rubens Barrichello (Brazil) Nonô Figueiredo (Brazil) Felipe Giaffone (Brazil) Tony Kanaan (Brazil) Ricardo Maurício	Porsche 911 GT3 Cup	352
46 DNF	GT	21	(United States) Dener Motorsport	(Brazil) Rubens Barrichello (Brazil) Nonô Figueiredo (Brazil) Felipe Giaffone (Brazil) Tony Kanaan (Brazil) Ricardo Maurício	Porsche 4.0L F6	352
47 DNF	DP	27	(United States) BTE Sport	(Canada) Emmanuel Anassis (Canada) Louis-Philippe Dumoulin (Estonia) Tõnis Kasemets (United States) Anthony Massari	Riley Mk. XX	304
47 DNF	DP	27	(United States) BTE Sport	(Canada) Emmanuel Anassis (Canada) Louis-Philippe Dumoulin (Estonia) Tõnis Kasemets (United States) Anthony Massari	Ford 5.0L V8	304
48 DNF	DP	77	(United States) Doran Racing	(United States) Jon Bennett (United States) Colin Braun (United States) Jim Lowe (Canada) Paul Tracy	Dallara (Riley Mk. XXVI)	286
48 DNF	DP	77	(United States) Doran Racing	(United States) Jon Bennett (United States) Colin Braun (United States) Jim Lowe (Canada) Paul Tracy	Ford 5.0L V8	286
49 DNF	GT	68	(United States) The Racer's Group	(Netherlands) Ivo Breukers (United States) Brad Lewis (United States) Jim Michaelian (Netherlands) Ronald van de Laar (Netherlands) Dennis van de Laar	Porsche 911 GT3 Cup	284
49 DNF	GT	68	(United States) The Racer's Group	(Netherlands) Ivo Breukers (United States) Brad Lewis (United States) Jim Michaelian (Netherlands) Ronald van de Laar (Netherlands) Dennis van de Laar	Porsche 4.0L F6	284
50 DNF	GT	18	(Belgium) Mühlner Motorsports America	(France) Kévin Estre (Canada) Mark Thomas (Austria) Norbert Siedler	Porsche 911 GT3 Cup	228
50 DNF	GT	18	(Belgium) Mühlner Motorsports America	(France) Kévin Estre (Canada) Mark Thomas (Austria) Norbert Siedler	Porsche 4.0L F6	228
51 DNF	GT	32	(United States) Konrad Motorsport/Orbit Racing	(Denmark) Michael Christensen (Germany) Christian Engelhart (United Kingdom) Nick Tandy (United States) Lance Willsey	Porsche 911 GT3 Cup	181
51 DNF	GT	32	(United States) Konrad Motorsport/Orbit Racing	(Denmark) Michael Christensen (Germany) Christian Engelhart (United Kingdom) Nick Tandy (United States) Lance Willsey	Porsche 4.0L F6	181
52 DNF	GT	31	(United States) Marsh Racing	(United States) Lawson Aschenbach (United States) Eric Curran (United States) Brandon Davis (United States) Boris Said	Chevrolet Corvette	136
52 DNF	GT	31	(United States) Marsh Racing	(United States) Lawson Aschenbach (United States) Eric Curran (United States) Brandon Davis (United States) Boris Said	Chevrolet 6.2L V8	136
53 DNF	GX	70	(United States) Mazdaspeed/Speedsource	(United States) Jonathan Bomarito (United Kingdom) Marino Franchitti (Canada) James Hinchcliffe (Canada) Sylvain Tremblay	Mazda6 GX	51
53 DNF	GX	70	(United States) Mazdaspeed/Speedsource	(United States) Jonathan Bomarito (United Kingdom) Marino Franchitti (Canada) James Hinchcliffe (Canada) Sylvain Tremblay	Mazda 2.2L I4 Diesel	51
54 DNF	GX	25	(United States) Freedom Autosport/Speedsource	(United States) Andrew Carbonell (United States) Tom Long (United States) Rhett O'Doski (United States) Derek Whitis	Mazda6 GX	45
54 DNF	GX	25	(United States) Freedom Autosport/Speedsource	(United States) Andrew Carbonell (United States) Tom Long (United States) Rhett O'Doski (United States) Derek Whitis	Mazda 2.2L I4 Diesel	45
55 DNF	GT	87	(United States) Vehicle Technologies	(United States) Tony Ave (Belgium) Jan Heylen (United States) Doug Peterson (United States) Moses Smith	SRT Viper	44
55 DNF	GT	87	(United States) Vehicle Technologies	(United States) Tony Ave (Belgium) Jan Heylen (United States) Doug Peterson (United States) Moses Smith	Dodge 8.0L V10	44
56 DNF	GX	00	(United States) Visit Florida Racing/Speedsource/Yellow Dragon Motorsports	(United States) Joel Miller (United States) Tristan Nunez (United States) Spencer Pigot (Japan) Yojiro Terada (France) Tristan Vautier	Mazda6 GX	33
56 DNF	GX	00	(United States) Visit Florida Racing/Speedsource/Yellow Dragon Motorsports	(United States) Joel Miller (United States) Tristan Nunez (United States) Spencer Pigot (Japan) Yojiro Terada (France) Tristan Vautier	Mazda 2.2L I4 Diesel	33
DNS	GT	93	(United States) Turner Motorsport	(United States) Bill Auberlen (United States) Michael Marsal (Belgium) Maxime Martin (United Kingdom) Andy Priaulx (United States) Gunter Schaldach	BMW M3	-
DNS	GT	93	(United States) Turner Motorsport	(United States) Bill Auberlen (United States) Michael Marsal (Belgium) Maxime Martin (United Kingdom) Andy Priaulx (United States) Gunter Schaldach	BMW 5.0L V8	-

Preceded by 2012 Championship Weekend	Rolex Sports Car Series; 2013	Succeeded by 2013 Grand-Am of The Americas
