= Brett Van Blankers =

Brett Van Blankers (born April 11, 1987) is a Canadian racing driver from New Westminster, British Columbia.

After karting, Van Blankers moved to Formula Renault 1600 in 2004. In 2005, he competed in FR1600 and the Formula TR 2000 Pro Series finishing seventh in points. In 2006, he competed in nine Indy Pro Series races for Brian Stewart Racing with a best finish of seventh at Watkins Glen International. He finished ninth in points. He stopped competing ever since, except for a one-off outing at the 24 Hours of Daytona in 2012 and some hillclimb racing. He now operates an excavator for his family's demolition business in Vancouver.

== Racing record ==
=== American Open-Wheel racing results ===
(key) (Races in bold indicate pole position, races in italics indicate fastest race lap)

==== Indy Pro Series ====
Year	Team	1	2	3	4	5	6	7	8	9	10	11	12	Rank	Points	Ref
2006	Brian Stewart Racing	HMS; 8	STP1; 9	STP2; 11	INDY; 14	WGL; 7	IMS; 17	NSH; 10	MIL; 8	KTY; 15	SNM1	SNM2	CHI	**9th**	**179**	
