= Jorge Goncalvez (racing driver) =

Venezuelan racing driver

- Nationality: (Venezuela) Venezuelan
- Born: June 14, 1991 (age 35) Los Teques, Miranda

Firestone Indy Lights Series career
- Debut season: 2011
- Car number: 4
- Starts: 37
- Wins: 0
- Podiums: 4
- Poles: 0
- Fastest laps: 0
- Best finish: 5th in 2011

Previous series
- 2009–10 2008 2007: Star Mazda Championship; Formula BMW Americas; French F4 Championship

Championship titles
- 2009–10: Star Mazda Winter Series

Jorge Andrés Goncalves, now spelling his last name Goncalvez, (born June 14, 1991) is a Venezuelan racing driver from Los Teques.

== Racing career ==
=== Early career ===
After karting, Goncalvez began his auto racing career in Formula Renault Campus France in 2007, finishing fourteenth. In 2008, he raced in Formula BMW USA for the Apex-HBR Racing Team and finished seventh. In 2009, Goncalvez moved to the Star Mazda Championship with AIM Autosport and finished ninth. After winning the 2009–2010 Formula Car Challenge presented by Goodyear Winter Series with Team Apex, Goncalvez returned to Team Apex for the full 2010 campaign. He finished fourth in points with five second-place finishes but no wins or poles.

=== Indy Lights ===
In 2011, Goncalvez signed with Belardi Auto Racing to compete in IndyCar's Firestone Indy Lights series. He captured four podium finishes, all on ovals, including a runner-up finish at the New Hampshire Motor Speedway and finished fifth in points. His best finish on a road or street course was a fourth place at Barber Motorsports Park. He signed on with Belardi to return to the series for the 2012 Indy Lights season. Goncalvez's performance regressed in 2012, which saw him failing to reach the podium and finishing last among drivers who competed in every race. He will return to the team and the series for a third season in 2013.

== Racing record ==
=== American open–wheel racing results ===
(key)

==== Star Mazda Championship ====
Year	Team	1	2	3	4	5	6	7	8	9	10	11	12	13	Rank	Points
2009	AIM Autosport	SEB; 9	VIR; 4	MMP; 13	NJ1; 9	NJ2; 10	MIL; 5	IOW; 20	ACC; 18	ACC; 15	TOR; 18	MOS; 6	ATL; 11	LAG; 5	9th	329
2010	Team Apex	SEB; 2	STP; 17	LAG; 11	ORP; 10	IOW; 2	NJ1; 9	NJ2; 5	ACC; 21	ACC; 7	TRO; 2	ROA; 2	MOS; 2	ATL; 9	4th	409

==== Indy Lights ====
Year	Team	1	2	3	4	5	6	7	8	9	10	11	12	13	14	Rank	Points	Ref
2011	Belardi Auto Racing	STP; 11	ALA; 4	LBH; 10	INDY; 11	MIL; 3	IOW; 6	TOR; 6	EDM1; 7	EDM2; 12	TRO; 9	NHM; 2	BAL; 16	KTY; 3	LVS; 3	5th	371	
2012	Belardi Auto Racing	STP; 11	ALA; 10	LBH; 9	INDY; 12	DET; DNS	MIL; 9	IOW; 6	TOR; 9	EDM; 11	TRO; 7	BAL; 7	FON; 13			10th	247	
2013	Belardi Auto Racing	STP; 6	ALA; 5	LBH; 4	INDY; 6	MIL; 7	IOW; 5	POC; 8	TOR; 8	MOH; 9	BAL; 5	HOU; 4	FON; 5			6th	336	
