= Mazda RX-01 =

Overview
- Manufacturer: Mazda
- Model years: 1996 (concept car)

Body and chassis
- Class: Sports car
- Body style: 2 door sports coupe

Powertrain
- Engine: 13B-MSP (multi-side port rotary engine)
- Transmission: 5-speed manual

Dimensions
- Wheelbase: 2,344 mm (92.3 in)
- Length: 4,055 mm (159.6 in)
- Width: 1,730 mm (68.1 in)
- Height: 1,245 mm (49.0 in)
- Curb weight: 1100 kg

The Mazda RX-01 was a concept car produced by Mazda that debuted at the 1995 Tokyo Motor Show.

Created partially in response to the state of the economy at the time and the resultant shrinkage of the high-end sports car market, the RX-01 team took a back-to-basics approach for a compact, simple and inexpensive sports car, much like the first generation RX-7. By this time, the RX-7 had evolved into an uncompromising "super sports car" with high performance, but poor comfort and a high price tag The RX-01 featured a radical front end with a floating bumper/spoiler made possible by its compact rotary engine, as well as a 2+2 seating arrangement.

The RX-01 featured the public appearance of the next generation of Mazda rotary engine design, the 13B-MSP. A naturally aspirated Wankel engine, its exhaust ports were now located in the side housing instead of the periphery of the rotor housing, thus preventing overlapping intake and exhaust port timing. This has several benefits: higher output, improved thermal efficiency, better fuel economy, and cleaner emissions. The 1308 cc engine produces 220 bhp (164 kW) at 8500 rpm. Acceleration from 0-60 mph (97 km/h) is claimed to be 5.7 seconds.

While it was hoped by enthusiasts that the RX-01 would be put into production as the next iteration of Mazda's rotary sports car and made available to world markets (the RX-7 was discontinued in North America after 1995), the declining interest in sports car over SUVs and Mazda's financial state at the time kept the RX-01 merely a concept car. The 13B-MSP would go on to be further developed into the eventual RENESIS engine that powers the RX-8.

== Development and design ==
Courtesy of various tweaks to its design, the new engine still managed to produce 220 bhp (164 kW) and 159 lb⋅ft (216 N⋅m) of torque, which was not that far off the output of the FD. It was mounted in a ‘front-midship’ position, where it was pushed back up against the firewall to aid weight distribution. The RX-01 was fitted with a five-speed manual gearbox, with power sent to the rear wheels. 0-60 mph was achieved in around five seconds and the RX-01 could reach a top speed of around 140 mph. Much of the performance was thanks to the overall smaller and lighter nature of the RX-01 when compared to the FD RX-7. It weighed in at only 1100 kg, which reflected the different approach Mazda took for the RX-01 that was heavily influenced by the first-generation MX-5. The concept was fully-functional and was described in Top Gear's road-test as handling much like an MX-5, while being received largely positively in general.

Inside, the RX-01 was described as having a 2+2 layout, though the rear seats could realistically only really be used for storage due to their complete lack of legroom. The 2+2 layout would end up being a core element of the FD's actual successor, the RX-8. Similar to the exterior, the RX-01 carried over small portions of the FD to its interior. The gauge cluster was the same, and the overall layout was fairly familiar. The colours of the interior were far bolder, with lots of red panels used to match the exterior colour accented by silver pieces and some carbon fibre in the centre console. While both the interior and exterior were distinctive (and depending on your opinion, quite good looking), neither has aged quite as well as the FD RX-7.

The RX-01 project never advanced past the concept stage. In the aforementioned Top Gear review it appeared likely that production would be achieved, but for whatever reason this never panned out. The decision is largely believed to have been due to Ford's purchase of a large stake in Mazda at the time. As far as Ford was concerned, the MX-5's success meant there was no need for another Mazda sports car, and so the RX-01 was shelved. The concept was not in vain though, as the engine from the RX-01 continued to be developed by a skunkworks team of Mazda engineers over the next few years, before it eventually became the ‘RENESIS’ engine in the RX-8, fulfilling its aim as the FD's successor.
