= Mazda RX-8 =

Sports car powered by a rotary engine

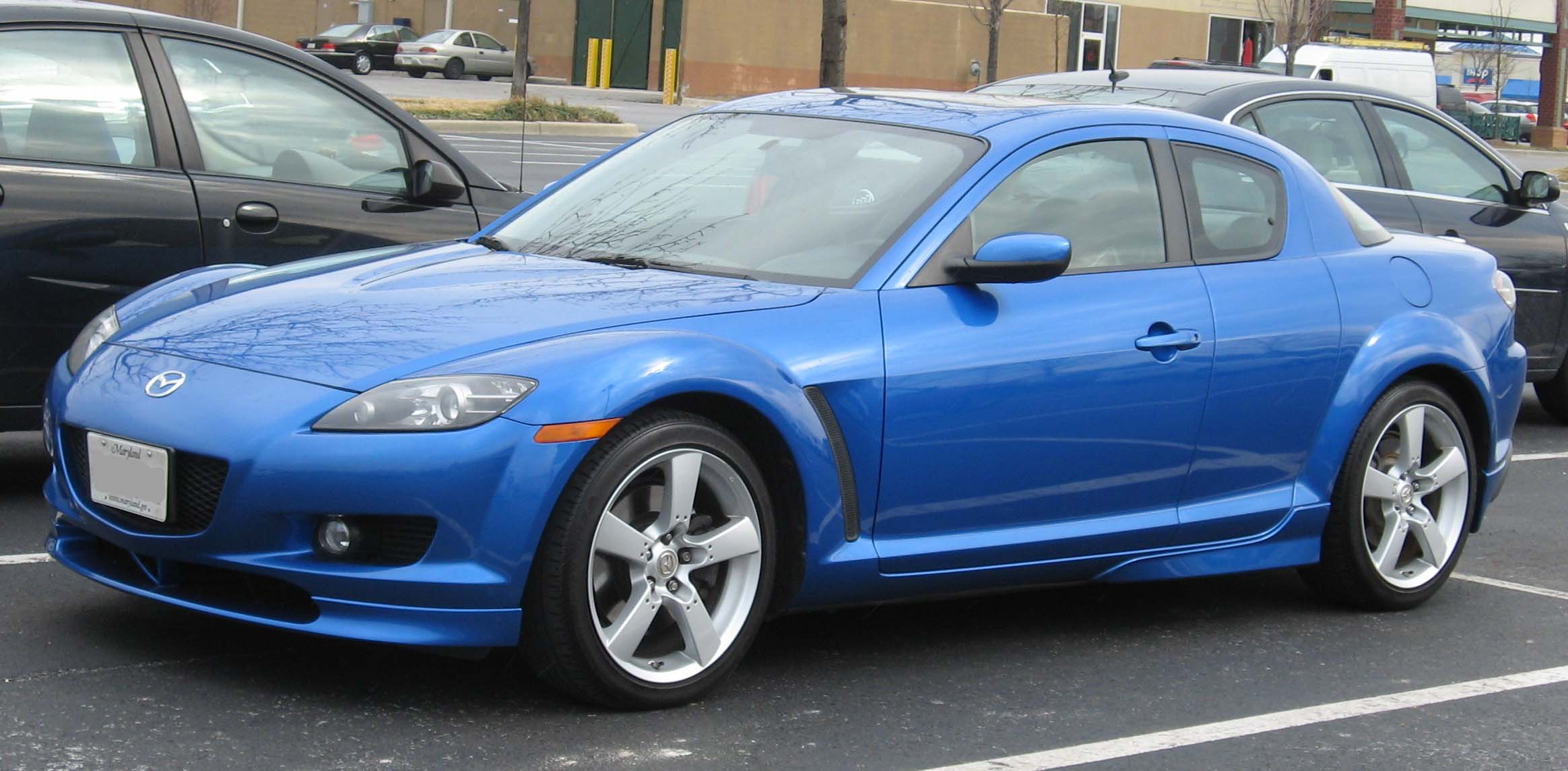

Overview
- Manufacturer: Mazda
- Model code: SE3P / FE
- Production: February 2003 – June 2012
- Model years: 2003–2012
- Assembly: Japan: Hiroshima (Hiroshima Plant)
- Designer: Ikuo Maeda; Wu-Huang Chin (interior designer)

Body and chassis
- Class: Sports car (S)
- Body style: Quad coupé
- Layout: Front mid-engine, rear-wheel-drive
- Doors: Conventional (front); Suicide (rear)
- Related: Mazda MX-5 (NC)

Powertrain
- Engine: 1.3 L Renesis twin-rotor
- Power output: 189–238 hp (141–177 kW)
- Transmission: 5-speed manual; 6-speed manual; 4-speed RC4A-EL automatic; 6-speed automatic

Dimensions
- Wheelbase: 2,703 mm (106.4 in)
- Length: 2003–2008: 4,425 mm (174.2 in); 2009–2012: 4,470 mm (176.0 in)
- Width: 1,770 mm (69.7 in)
- Height: 1,340 mm (52.8 in)
- Curb weight: Manual models: 1,309–1,373 kg (2,886–3,027 lb); Automatic models: 1,384 kg (3,051 lb)

Chronology
- Predecessor: Mazda RX-7

The Mazda RX-8 is a sports car manufactured by Japanese automobile manufacturer Mazda between 2003 and 2012. It was first shown in 2001 at the North American International Auto Show. It is the direct successor to the RX-7. Like its predecessors in the RX range, it is powered by a KKM-style (although the exhaust ports are moved to reduce port overlap) rotary Wankel engine. The RX-8 was available for the 2003 model year in most parts of the world.

The Mazda RX-8 utilizes a rotary Wankel engine, and the non-reciprocating piston engine uses a triangular rotor inside a pinched-oval-like epitrochoidal housing, producing from 141 kW (189 hp) and 164 lb⋅ft (222 N⋅m) of torque, to 177 kW (237 hp) and 159 lb⋅ft (216 N⋅m) of torque from launch.

The RX-8 was discontinued for the 2012 model year without a successor. It was removed earlier from the European market in 2010 after the car failed to meet emissions standards. Due to falling sales from Europe coupled with rising yen prices, Mazda could not justify the continued sale of the RX-8 in other markets. 192,094 units were produced during its nine-year production run.

== Background ==
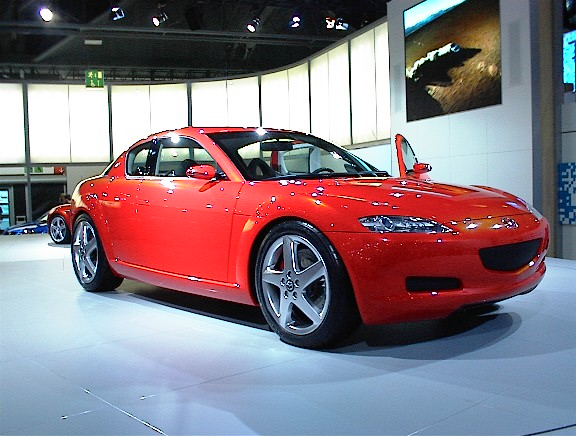

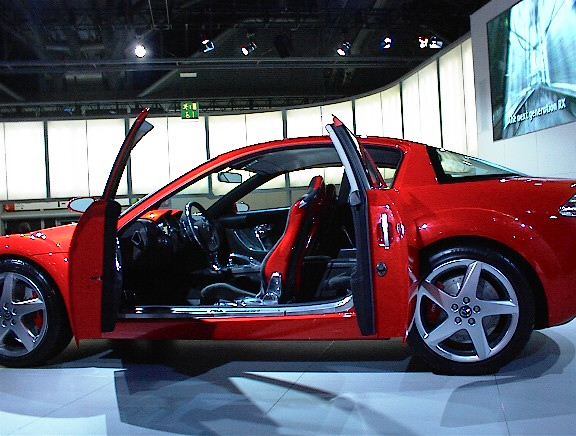
2001 Mazda RX-8 concept

Mazda introduced rotary-powered vehicles in the US in 1971, beginning with the R100 and eventually introduced the RX-2, RX-3, RX-4, RX-5, and three generations of the RX-7 sports car in the US and worldwide markets. However, due to the lack of conveniences and user-friendliness, coupled with the high price tag and declining interest in sports cars and coupés at the time, Mazda decided to withdraw the RX-7 from most major markets except Japan. After 1995, Mazda suffered from a relatively undistinguished and ordinary product line in the US except for the MX-5 Miata.

As popular interest in import tuning and performance cars resurged in the late-1990s, due in part to various popular cultural influences, Japanese automakers waded back into the performance and sports car market in the US and in worldwide markets. Endeavoring to rejuvenate itself around this time, partially with financial and management assistance from its new owner Ford, Mazda developed a new line of high-quality cars with desirable styling and driving dynamics superior to competitors, beginning with the Mazda6 and followed by the Mazda3. This paved the way for the arrival of Mazda's next-generation rotary powered sports car.

The RX-8 combined two previous products (the internationally sold RX-7, and the Cosmo which was exclusive to Japan), with the exterior dimensions of the RX-8 to be slightly smaller than those of the Cosmo. Mazda chose not to install the 2.0 L three-rotor 20B-REW, which was discontinued in 1996 when the Cosmo ceased production.

== Development and design ==
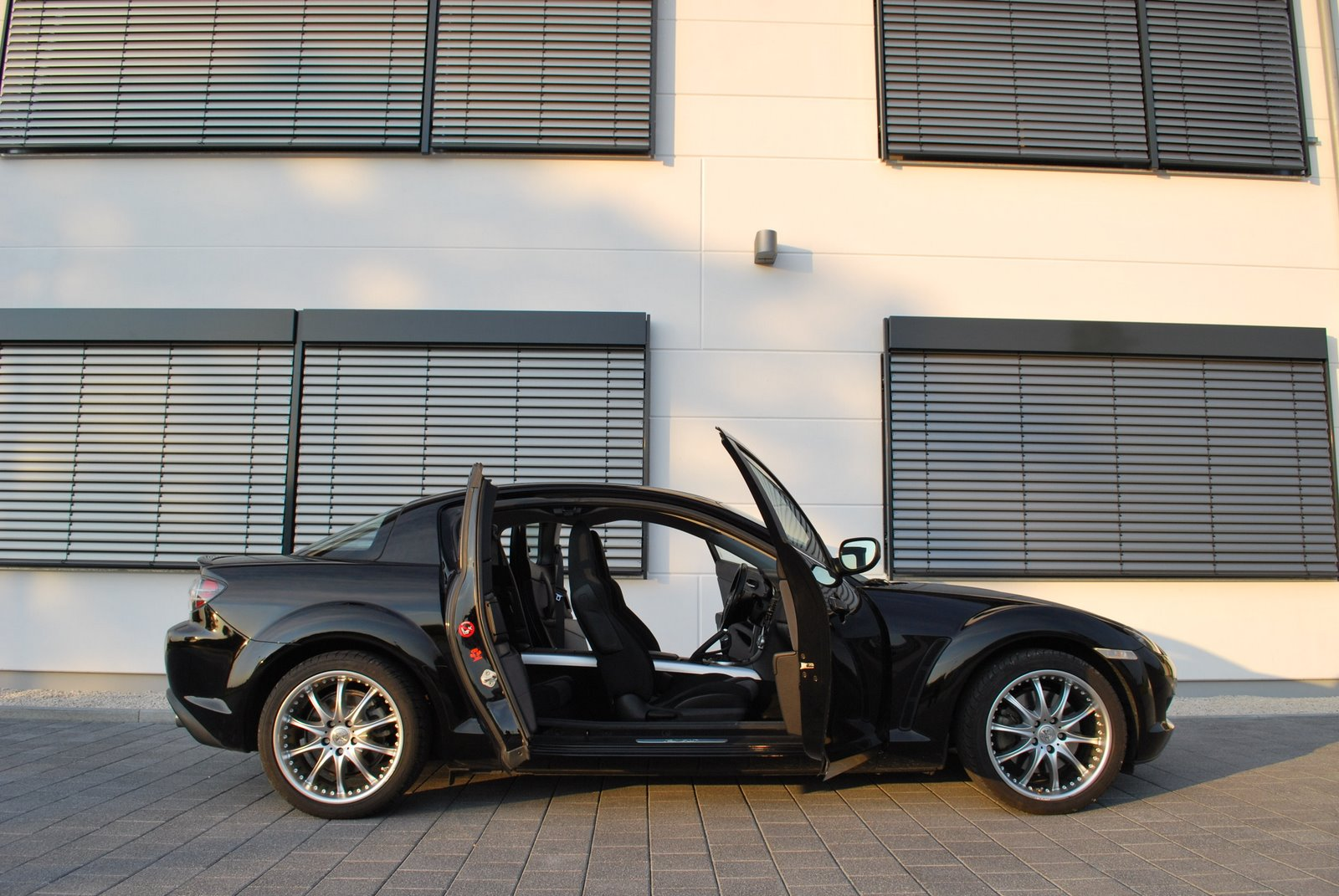
"Freestyle" doors

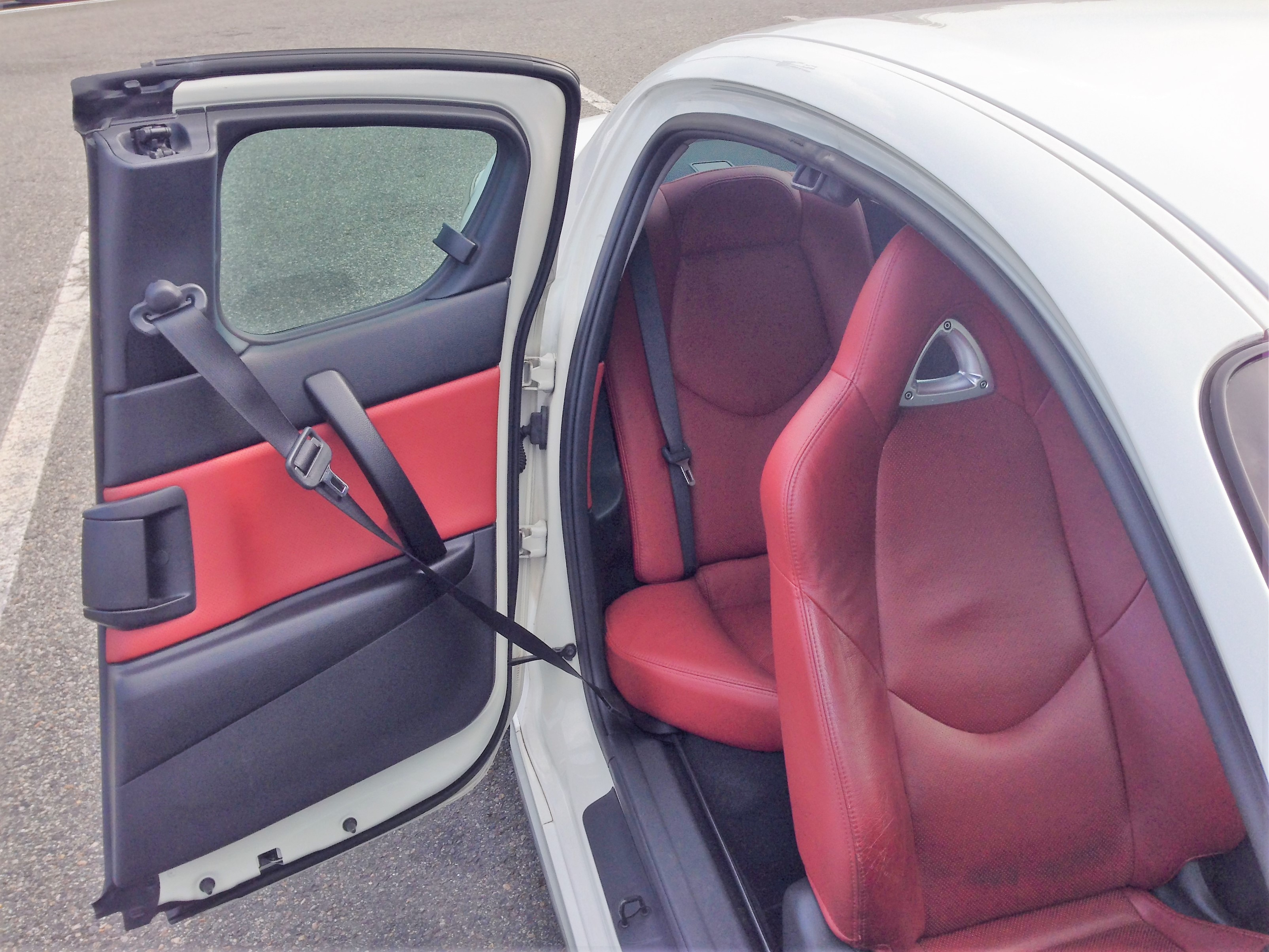
Rear door

The development of the RX-8 can be traced as far back as the 1995 RX-01 concept car, which featured an early iteration of the 13B-MSP engine. Naturally aspirated with side exhaust ports, this engine has a power output of 210 hp (157 kW). Because of Mazda's financial position at the time and the growing market interest in SUVs, the RX-01 did not see further development or production. However, a "skunkworks project" engineering team within Mazda kept the development of the 13B-MSP alive using an elongated MX-5 chassis known internally as "gokiburi-ka", or "cockroach car" translated to English, eventually catching the attention of management, which was by then heavily influenced by Ford. Development of the 13B-MSP advanced and eventually led to the RENESIS name debuting along with the RX-EVOLV concept car which began to bear semblance to the production version of the RX-8 with the "freestyle" rear suicide doors. The styling was further refined, in Mazda tradition, by competition between its design studios in Japan, the US, and Europe. The lead designer was Ikuo Maeda, the son of Matasaburo Maeda (the lead designer of the original RX-7). The project obtained official approval from management under one condition, that the resulting car should have four doors, and eventually the RX-8 concept car (design/engineering model) was produced and shown in 2001, closer resembling the production version. A near-production "reference exhibit" RX-8 was shown shortly thereafter at the 2001 Tokyo Motor Show, pending final approval for production. The production version of the RX-8 closely resembles this vehicle save for minor trim details, and "Job 1" began in February, 2003 at Mazda's Hiroshima plant in Japan.

The RX-8 was designed as a front mid-engine, rear-wheel-drive, four-door, four-seater quad coupé. The car has a near 50:50 front-rear weight distribution and a low polar moment of inertia, achieved by mounting the engine behind the front axle and by placing the fuel tank ahead of the rear axle. The front suspension uses double wishbones and the rear suspension is multi-link. Weight is trimmed through the use of materials such as aluminum and plastic for several body panels. The rest of the body is made of steel, except for the plastic front and rear bumpers. The manual gearbox model uses a carbon fiber composite driveshaft to reduce the rotational mass (momentum of inertia) connected to the engine. Power is sent to the rear wheels through a torque-sensing conical limited-slip differential for improved handling. While underpowered in comparison to the final variant of the RX-7, the RX-8 is considered its successor as Mazda's rotary engine sports car.

A prominent feature of the RX-8 is its rear-hinged "freestyle" doors (similar to suicide doors) that provide easier access to the rear seats. The RX-8 has no B-pillars between the front and rear doors, but the leading edge of the rear door acts as a "virtual pillar" to maintain structural rigidity. Because of the overlapping design, the rear doors can be opened only when the front doors are open. The RX-8's cabin was designed to allow enough room to house four adults, making it a genuine 4-seater rather than a 2+2. In designing the RX-8, Mazda's engineers were able to achieve a chassis stiffness rating of 30,000 Nm/deg.

== Pre-facelift release (2003–2008) ==
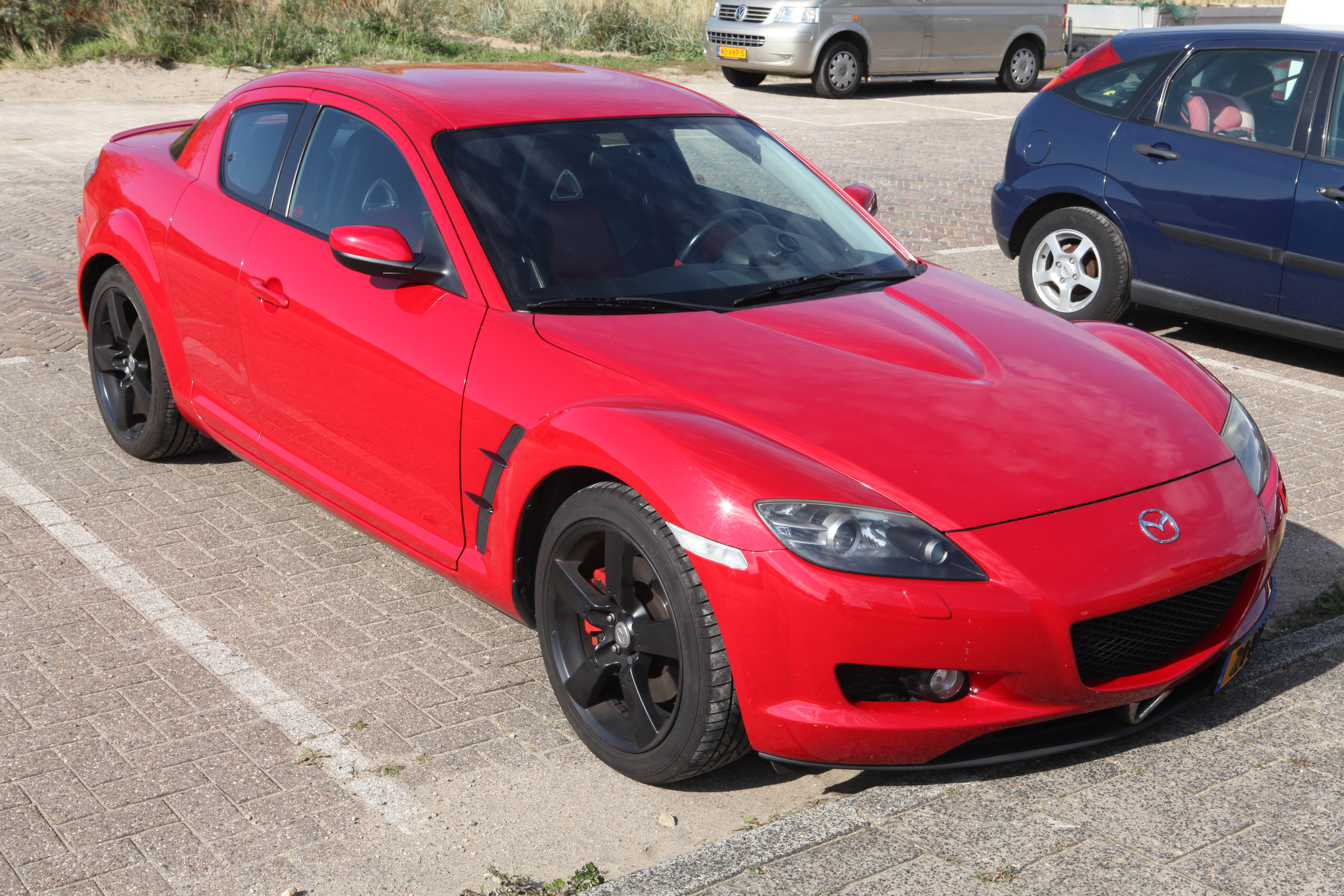

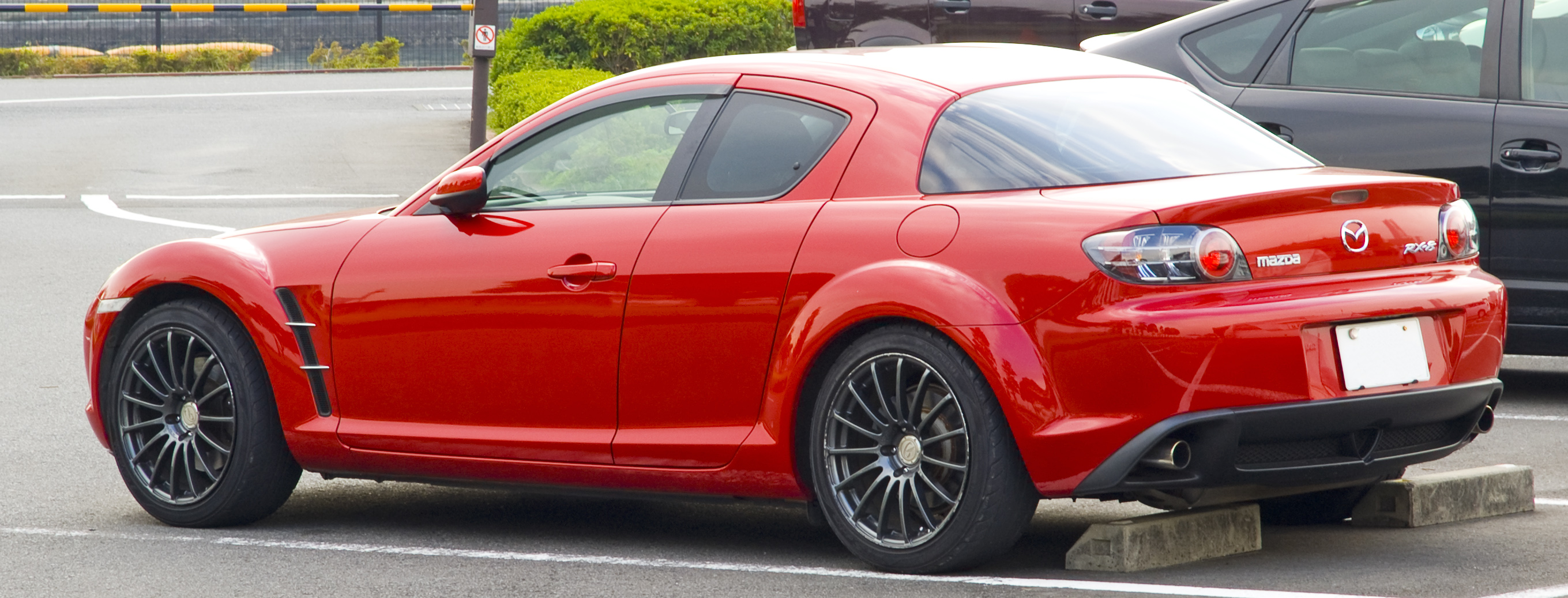
Mazda RX-8 SE3P (2003–2008)

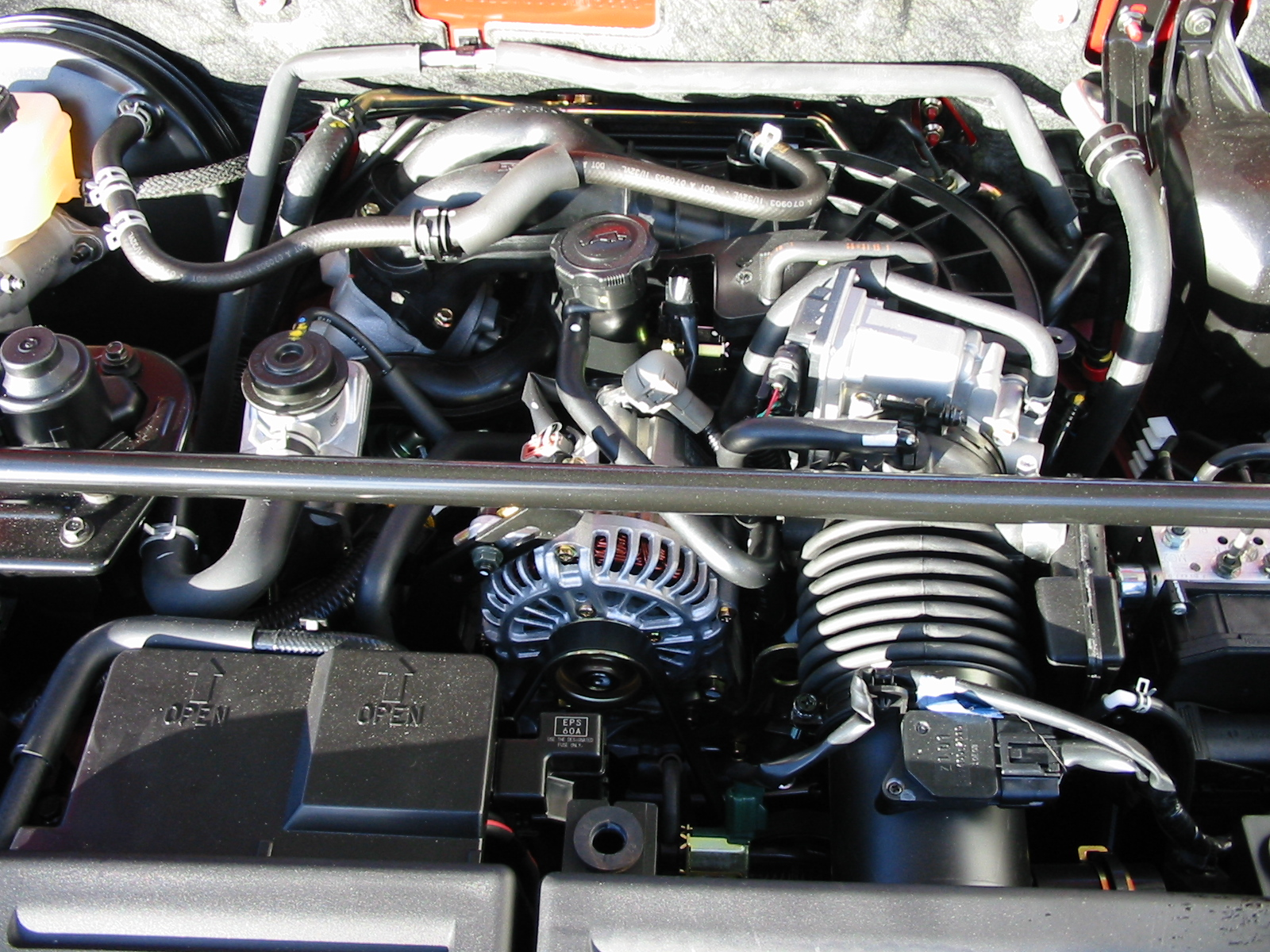
The 1.3 L RENESIS 13B-MSP Wankel engine

The early models of the RX-8, having chassis codes SE3P, and JM1FE, were produced from the 2003 model year, though the car's U.S. debut was for the 2004 model year. It is powered by the RENESIS 13B-MSP (2-rotor, multi-side-port) Wankel engine displacing 1.3 L (1,308 cc). The four-port standard Renesis was rated at 191 hp (194 PS; 142 kW) and was coupled with either a five-speed manual or four-speed automatic transmission. From 2003 to 2008, the six-port engine was available with a six-speed manual transmission and was rated at 238 hp (241 PS; 177 kW). From 2006 to 2008, the six-port, six-speed automatic paddle-shift variant was available. The six-port engine was not sold in Europe.

=== RX-8 Generation One port options ===
RX-8 Renesis options
Transmission Year	Auto		Manual	
Transmission Year	4-sp	6-sp (Note: Paddle shift available)	5-sp	6-sp
2003	4-port (Note: Exclusive to European markets)	—N/a	4-port (Note: Not sold in North America)	6-port
2004	4-port	—N/a	4-port	6-port
2005	4-port	—N/a	4-port	6-port
2006	4-port	6-port (Note: Not sold in Europe)	4-port	6-port
2007	4-port	6-port	4-port	6-port
2008	4-port	6-port	4-port	6-port

Notes

For the North American market, Mazda revised the reported output rating of the standard and high-power Renesis soon after launch to 189 hp (141 kW) and 237 hp (177 kW), respectively. With exhaust ports now located in the side housing, the Renesis had improved fuel efficiency and emissions rating over the 13B-REW employed by the preceding RX-7, thereby making it possible to be sold in North America.

At launch, the RX-8 was available in various models in different markets around the world. The variations according to different markets are as follows:

- 6-speed manual with a claimed output of 232 hp (235 PS; 173 kW) at 8,250 rpm and 159 lb⋅ft (216 N⋅m) of torque at 5,500 rpm with a 9,000 rpm (redline limited) (Sold in North America). This model was equivalent to the "Type S" trim in Japan.
- 5-speed manual with engine tuned to 189 hp (192 PS; 141 kW) with the redline reduced to 7,500 rpm. This powertrain combination was not available in North America.
- 6-speed automatic with paddle shifting option (introduced in the U.S. for the 2006 model year, replacing the 4-speed automatic transmission of 2004–2005) with the engine rated at 212 hp (215 PS; 158 kW) and 159 lb⋅ft (216 N⋅m) of torque with a redline at 7,500 rpm. This was the revised standard RENESIS, now with two extra intake ports like the high power version. The 2006 automatic RX-8 model also was given a second oil cooler, as was standard in the manual transmission model.

Automatic versions all had lower output/lower rpm engines due to the lack of availability of a transmission that would be able to reliably cope with the engine's high rpm limits.

=== Mazdaspeed ===
In 2003 Mazda announced a factory Mazdaspeed version of the RX-8 exclusively in Japan. Based on the Type S and tuned by Mazda's in-house division Mazdaspeed, the car included both mechanical, suspension, and aerodynamic improvements over the standard RX-8's. Mazdaspeed RX-8's were considered the highest performance model of the pre-facelift RX-8. Mechanical and suspension improvements included a new performance exhaust system, upgraded spark plugs, grounding kit, lightweight flywheel, re-balanced eccentric shaft, performance brake pads, stiffer anti-roll bars, four point front strut tower brace, rear strut tower brace, as well as a set of height and damping force adjustable coil-overs. Mazdaspeed also redesigned the aerodynamics of the car, giving it a new front bumper, with enlarged venting and oil cooler ducting, as well as side skirts, rear under spoiler, and a rear wing. The Mazdaspeed RX-8 was offered in either strato blue mica, or sunlight silver metallic as exclusive colors. A total of 480 factory Mazdaspeed Version RX-8s were built, and had a suggested retail price of JP¥3,650,000.00. Mazda also sold Mazdaspeed accessories worldwide through their dealerships. These accessories included both parts that were not equipped on factory Mazdaspeed RX-8s as well as nearly all the parts equipped on the factory Mazdaspeed version. This allowed standard RX-8s to be upgraded to Mazdaspeed standards through dealerships around the world.

=== NR-A ===
Mazda introduced the NR-A kit for the RX-8 Type S in January 2004, approved by the Japan Automobile Federation (JAF). The NR-A kit, sold through Mazda Anfini and other dealers throughout Japan, brings the RX-8 up to specification in terms of eligibility for participation in the one-make Party Race sanctioned by JAF. The kit includes a roll bar, sports radiator, oil-cooler kit, tow hooks, and racing brake pads.

=== Hydrogen RE ===
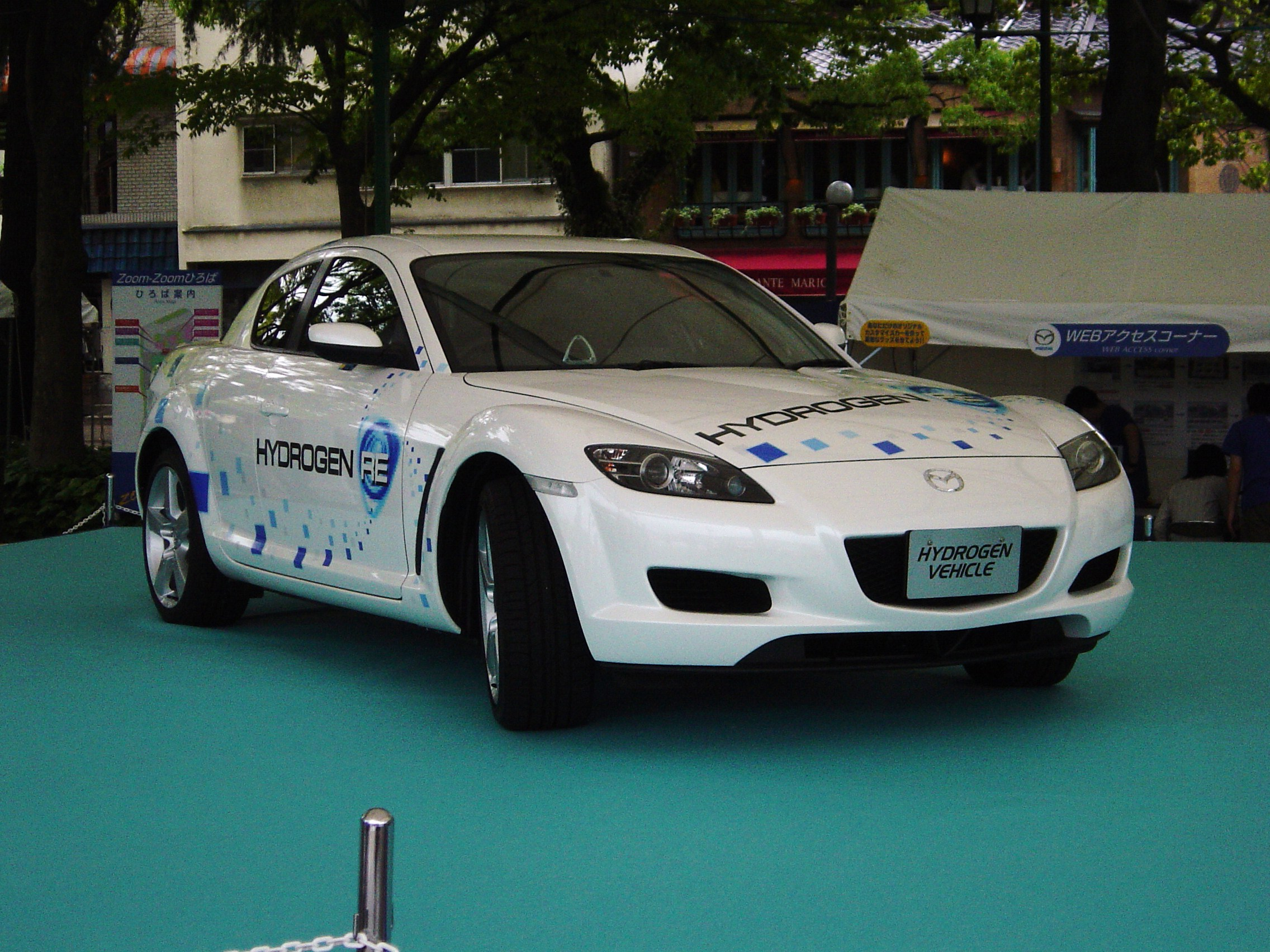
Mazda RX-8 Hydrogen RE

At the 2004 North American International Auto Show, Mazda unveiled the RX-8 Hydrogen RE concept car, designed to run on either hydrogen or gasoline. In February 2006, Mazda announced that it would start leasing a dual fuel RX-8 to commercial customers in Japan, and in March, 2006 announced its first two customers, claiming the first fleet deliveries of a dual hydrogen/gasoline production car. In 2008, 30 RX-8 HRE were delivered to HyNor.

=== Shinka ===
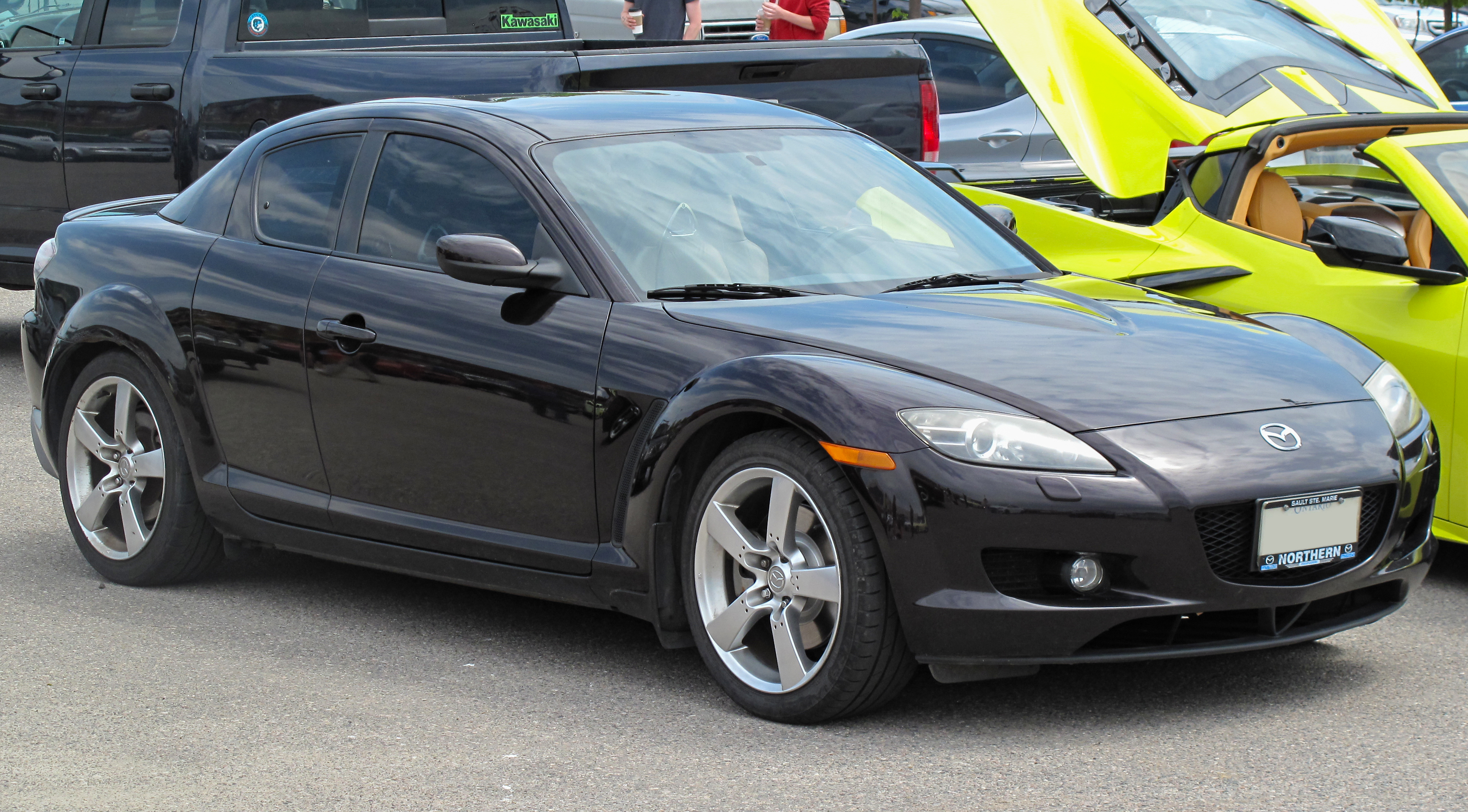
Mazda RX-8 Shinka Edition

In 2005 and 2006, Mazda introduced the first special edition of the RX-8 called "Sports Prestige Limited" in Japan and "Shinka" in North America. The Shinka takes its name from the Japanese word meaning "transformation" or "evolution". Marketed as a more luxurious grand touring model, it came with Black Cherry in 05 and Various Special exterior colors in 06. Sand color parchment leather and suede interior along with subtly chromed 18-inch wheels. Out of the total production of 2,150 vehicles, 1,357 were produced for the North American market. The most significant mechanical change were slightly revised Bilstein shocks and suspension cross member injected with urethane foam to improve ride quality.

=== Evolve ===
Launched in 2006, the 'Evolve' was the first special edition for the UK. The new model was named after the original Mazda concept car seen in Detroit in 2000 and was limited to a production run of 500 cars.

Based on the 228 hp (231 PS; 170 kW) high-power version, it had several unique exterior features. These include a choice of two exclusive exterior colors (Copper Red Mica 400 and Phantom Blue Mica 100), unique dark silver 18 × 8J alloy wheels, a polished aluminum Rotary crest on the front air dam, dark silver bezel headlamps, sports door mirrors, polished aluminum side air outlet fins, Rotary branded B-pillar trims, chrome exhaust surrounds.

Inside, the Evolve features unique stone leather and alcantara sporty seat trim, plus black leather-wrapped steering wheel, gear knob and hand-brake lever.

=== PZ ===
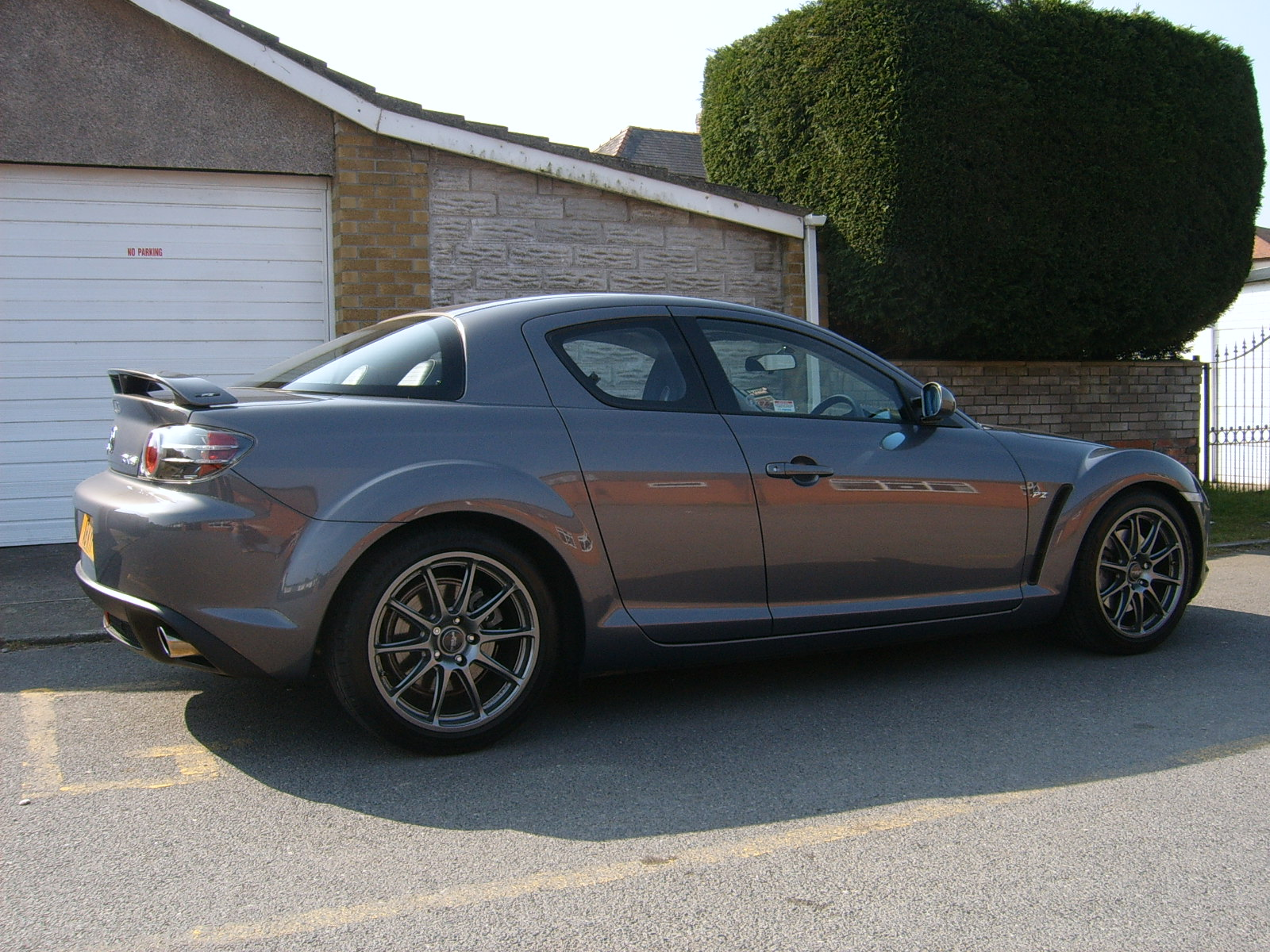
RX-8 PZ edition

In May 2006, Mazda released the RX-8 PZ for the UK market. This car was jointly developed with motorsports company Prodrive. Only available with a six-speed manual, it featured custom 10-spoke alloy wheels supplied by Italian F1 team supplier OZ Racing in "Dark Silver" finish, mirrors developed to reduce drag, front and rear black mesh grilles, and a rear spoiler to provide more stability at higher speeds. Both the wheels and rear wing are badged in carbon fiber with "Prodrive". Significant revisions were also made to the suspension to improve the handling: dampers from Bilstein and coil springs from Eibach are used in addition to reducing the ride height by 15 mm (0.6 in) and an increase in spring rate of 60%. Finally, the car was supplied with a unique upgraded twin exhaust system, with exhaust tailpipes branded as "Prodrive". A total of 800 cars were made at an MSRP of £25,995. It was available in two colors, Galaxy Grey (380) and Brilliant Black (420).

=== Revelation ===
The Revelation was an Australian special edition of the RX-8 with a limited production run of 100 cars. The model incorporated the top specification features of the standard RX-8 with the 9-speaker Bose sound system, sand beige colored leather seats, more piano black accents on the interior, and came with the same 13B Renesis rotary engine. Like regular RX-8 variants, the Revelation features 18-inch alloy wheels and tires, traction control, Dynamic Stability Control (DSC), six airbags, cruise control, power windows/mirrors, limited-slip differential, 6-CD in-dash audio system and climate control air conditioning. The revelation though, added stiffer anti-roll bars, foam-filled cross members and special edition grey-spoke alloys. The Revelation also offered a new color, Copper Red, and also came in Brilliant Black. It also came with xenon headlights with chrome bezels, while being the first Mazda sold in Australia with keyless entry and start.

=== Nemesis ===
The 'Nemesis' model is the third special edition model launched as a UK exclusive. It was launched in 2006, although some cars were registered in 2007 due to stock runoff. The 'Nemesis' features unique paint colors and interior trim, plus an exclusive accessory package, at a cost that was at the time £330 less than the model on which it is based – when similarly specified. Based on the standard 189 hp (192 PS; 141 kW) version of the Mazda RX-8, it included a unique stone leather seat trim interior and came with a five-speed manual transmission. The Nemesis has several other unique exterior and interior features. Two exclusive colors were available, Copper Red Mica and Stormy Blue Mica, each Nemesis also comes with a polished aluminum Rotary crest on the front air dam, polished aluminum side air-outlet trims behind the front wheel arches, special B-pillar trims with a Rotary crest and 'Nemesis' badging. Inside, these special edition models also featured Nemesis branded luxury carpet mats and Mazda RX-8 branded aluminum door scuff plates. Like other standard 245 hp (183 kW; 248 PS) RX-8s, the Nemesis has front fog lights, heated front seats, electrically operated driver's seat, climate control air conditioning, 9-speaker BOSE premium audio system with 6-CD auto-changer, plus a black leather-wrapped steering wheel, gear knob and hand-brake lever. The Nemesis has a top speed of 139 mph (224 km/h) and accelerates from 0 to 60 mph (97 km/h) in 7.2 seconds. Each Nemesis buyer also qualified for a complimentary Prodrive experience day. A total of 350 examples were built, 200 in Copper Red and 150 in Stormy Blue.

=== Mazdaspeed M'z Tune ===
In December 2006, a new Mazdaspeed RX-8 became available exclusively in Japan. The Mazdaspeed M'z Tune was focused on performance without the expense of comfort, and was equipped with a performance exhaust system, lightweight flywheel, improved radiator, Bilstein shock absorbers, and sport springs. The car came with a new exclusive aerodynamic kit, featuring a new front lip, side skirts, and rear lower bumper.

=== Kuro ===
In 2007 Mazda released a UK only limited edition known as the Kuro (Japanese for black). The production run was limited to 500 cars. All cars were finished in sparkling black mica paint, with five-spoke 18-inch wheels. The Kuro version used a more evolved RENESIS engine and 6-speed manual transmission with a claimed output of 227 hp (230 PS; 169 kW) and 156 lb⋅ft (212 N⋅m). Inside, it featured a Stone white leather interior, Bose premium audio system with 6-CD auto-changer, heated seats, electrically-operated driver's seat, and climate control air conditioning, cruise control, traction control, dynamic stability control and eight airbags. This edition has racing-type fully adjustable front & rear Tein suspension, bigger exhaust tips, fog lights, stiffer anti roll bars, better engine cooling system, and a limited-slip differential. After the Kuro version, Mazda announced that this is the absolute Mazda RX-8 version with a suggested retail price of US$60,000/JP¥6,653,550.00.

=== 40th Anniversary Limited Edition ===
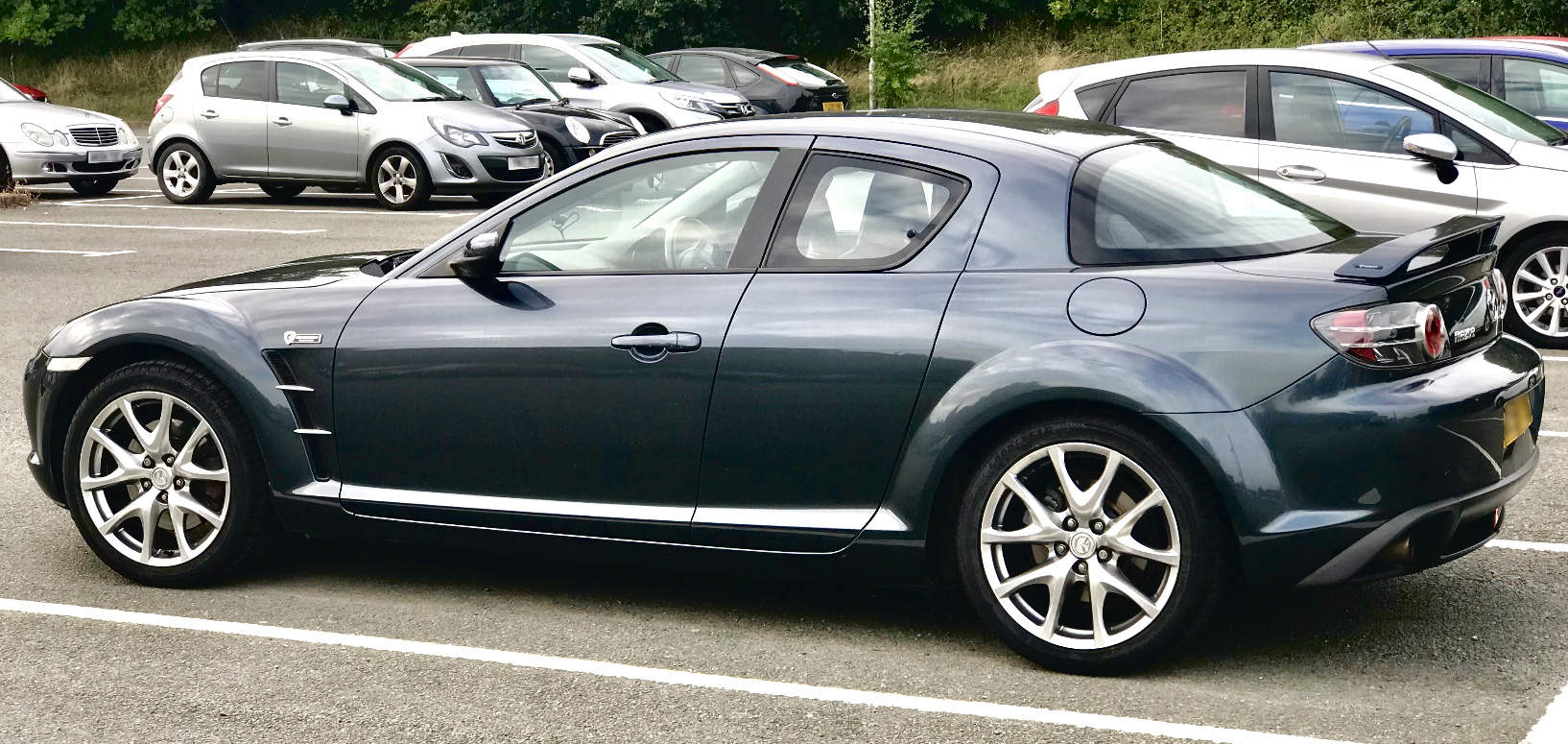
Mazda RX-8 40th Anniversary Edition – Metropolitan Grey Mica

2008 saw the introduction of a limited edition to celebrate the 40th anniversary of Mazda's rotary engine. It had 10-spoke, 18-inch diameter alloy wheels of a new design that were later incorporated in the 2009 facelift. Also added were blue-light front fog lamps, a 40th Anniversary badge on each front wing and an aerodynamic rear spoiler. Exclusive sport-tuned suspension with Bilstein dampers were added along with an enhanced urethane foam injected front cross member intended to improve steering feel. The 40th anniversary limited editions were slightly different in the various international markets. The Japanese version came in Marble White as a homage to the Mazda Cosmo Sport, which was initially only available in white. The North American (USA and Canada) version came in Metropolitan Grey Mica exterior color with the interior clad in special Cosmo Red leather. In North America, this special edition was available only in 2008. For Canada – production was limited to 100 cars. The interior had black leather with copper red accented door inserts. For the Australian market, 200 examples of the 40th Anniversary Edition were produced in 2008 exclusively. It was available in Metropolitan Grey, Dark Blue, or Brilliant Black exterior paint. The interior came with exclusive white Alcantara and black leather seats with contrasting white stitching. In the United Kingdom, this edition was limited to 400 cars which came in two exclusive exterior colors – Metropolitan Grey Mica or Crystal White Pearlescent. Seats were trimmed in black leather with stone Alcantara midsections.

== Facelift release (2008–2012) ==
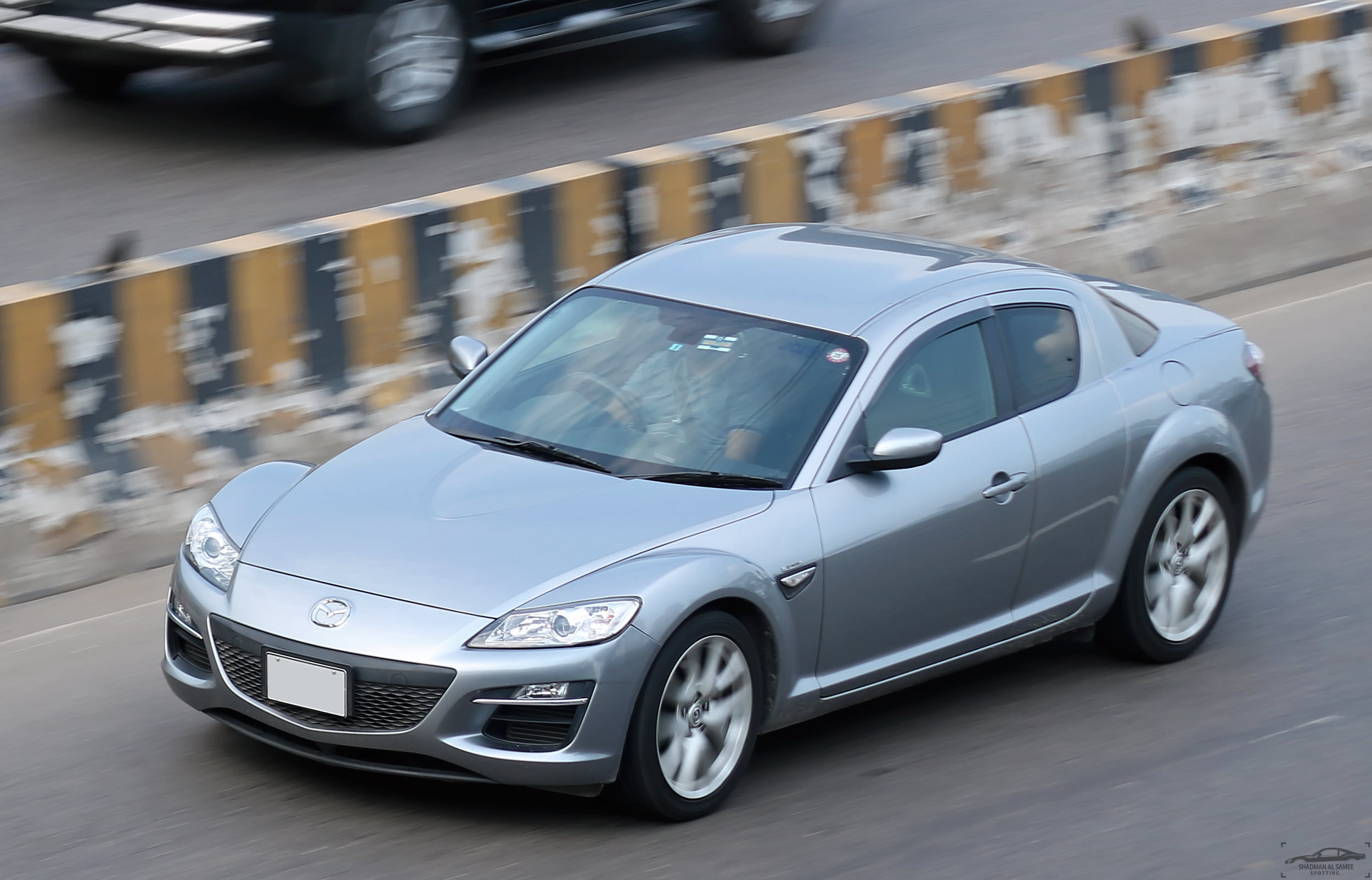
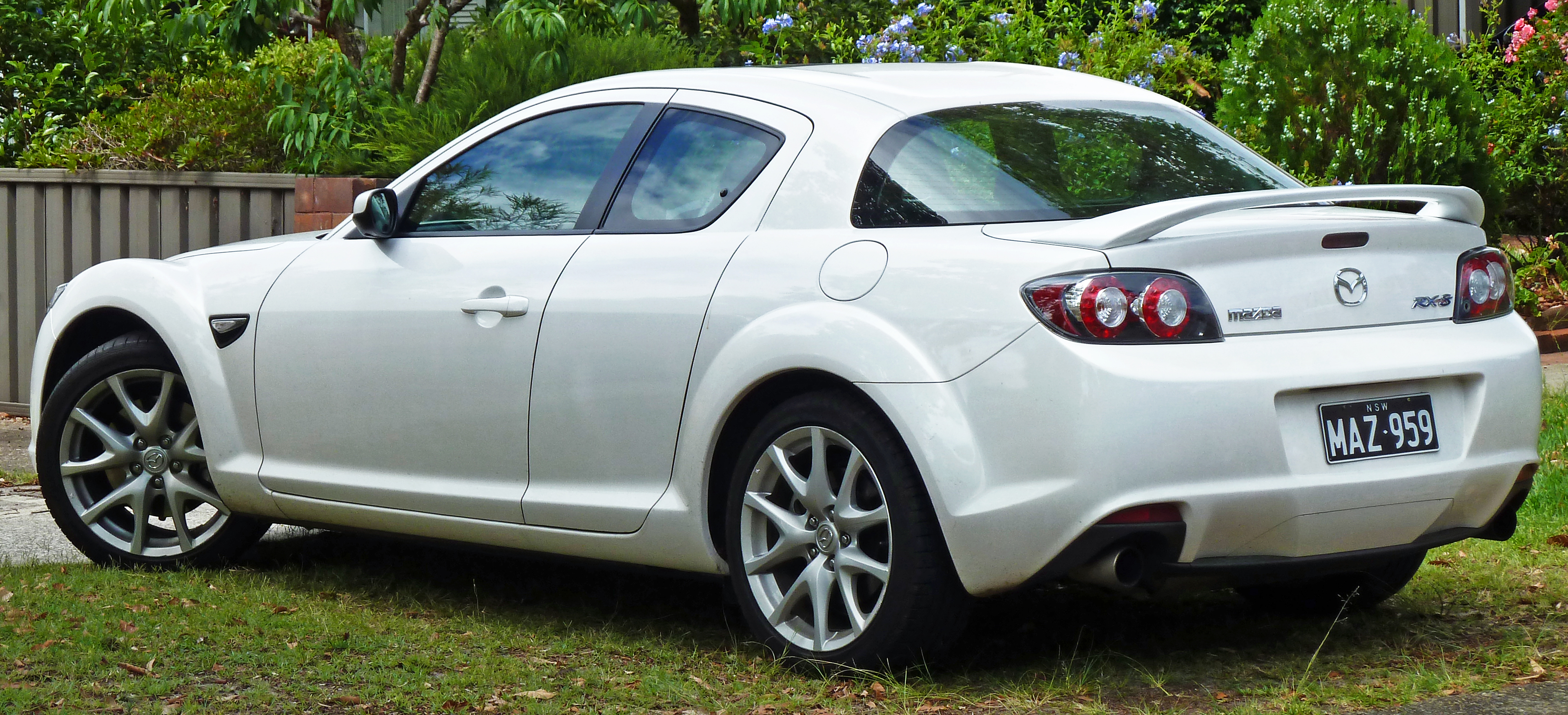
Mazda RX-8 (2008-2012 facelift)

In November 2008, Mazda improved the RX-8 body rigidity through the addition of structural reinforcements, by adding a trapezoidal shock tower brace and enhancing the local rigidity of the front suspension tower areas. The rear suspension geometry was revised for better handling, and the final-drive-gear ratio on manual transmission cars was shortened from 4.444 to 4.777 for improved off-the-line performance. While minimal, these changes gave the updated RX-8 increased acceleration and performance. Mazda engineers claimed that the second generation RX-8 was (slightly) faster than the previous generation due to the lower gearing and improved suspension. The Renesis II engine iteration that was launched in the 2009 model year included a third oil injection port in each rotor housing to feed oil to the middle of the rotor facing, making this their first all-new EMOP (Electric Metering Oil Pump) with a total of 6 lubrication injectors, plus an all-new engine oil pump with higher pressure rating that requires specific oil filter rated for the higher pressure. New catalytic converter was used to reduce clogging that resulted in overheating exhaust stream forward of the catalytic converter and eventual rotor side seal failure, which was responsible for majority of RX-8 engine failures. Ignition coil packs, which suffer reduced performance over time and leads to unburnt fuel and oil that eventually clogs the catalytic converter remained unchanged. Due to higher usage cycle that is two to three times higher in Wankel compared to Otto cycle, ignition coil packs on RX-8 can degrade much sooner than Piston engines using similar hardware, and cause unburnt fuel to reach the catalytic converter, clogging it and cause engine overheating leading to side seal springs failure.

The updated RX-8 also received design enhancements that were meant to freshen the styling and give the RX-8 a new look, without impairing the basic design theme. Refinements for the 2009 model year included a more aggressive restyled front and rear bumper as well as a new front fascia. The updated RX-8 also came with sporty, high-quality finish front and rear headlamps as well as larger exhaust pipes (now measuring 90 mm (3.5 in) across). The 2009 RX-8 also offered a new five-spoke wheel design featuring a symbolic and sporty design reminiscent of the rotary engine, with different arrangements for each wheel size. A rear spoiler was also added dependent on the trim level selected. There were three trims available to consumers from 2009 to 2012: Sport, Grand Touring, and R3.

=== Mazdaspeed Concept ===
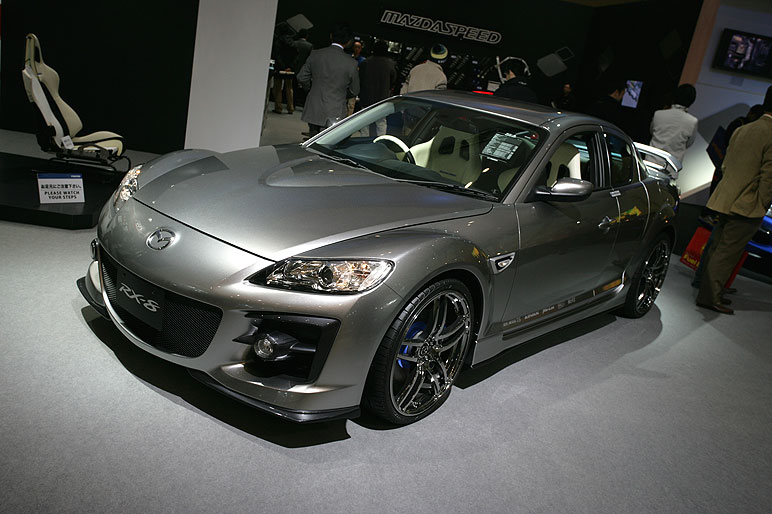
Mazda RX-8 Mazdaspeed Concept

In 2008, Mazda unveiled a Mazdaspeed RX-8 equipped with racing seats, and a new aerodynamic package for the refreshed RX-8. Mazda however didn't end up selling any new generation Mazdaspeed editions or accessories to the public.

=== R3 ===
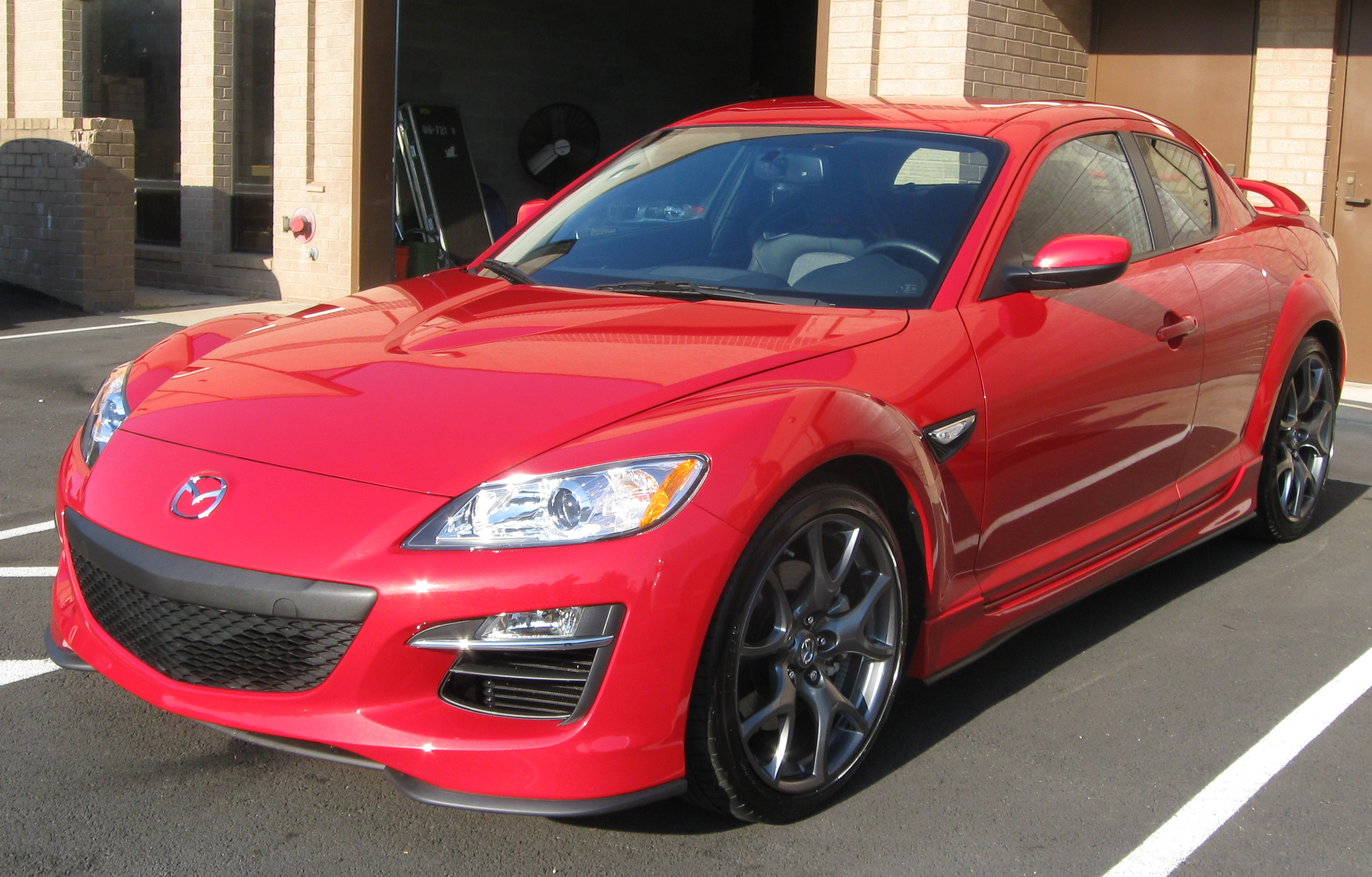
Mazda RX-8 R3

The R3 version was first introduced in 2008 in Japan. This version was very limited and had the 1.3 L RENESIS Wankel engine. The R3 model was again introduced in 2009. The 2009 R3 package added slightly improved suspension over the base model by adding Bilstein shock absorbers and a foam filled front crossmember to improve rigidity. It also came with 19-inch forged aluminum-alloy wheels and high performance tires. On the exterior, the R3 had a different, lower front bumper sporting a splitter, lower side sills, and a standard rear spoiler. There is a pair of special Recaro seats up front, along with the same 300-watt Bose audio system, along with Bluetooth and the Mazda advanced keyless entry and start system. No electric sunroof was offered in the R3 model.

=== Spirit R ===
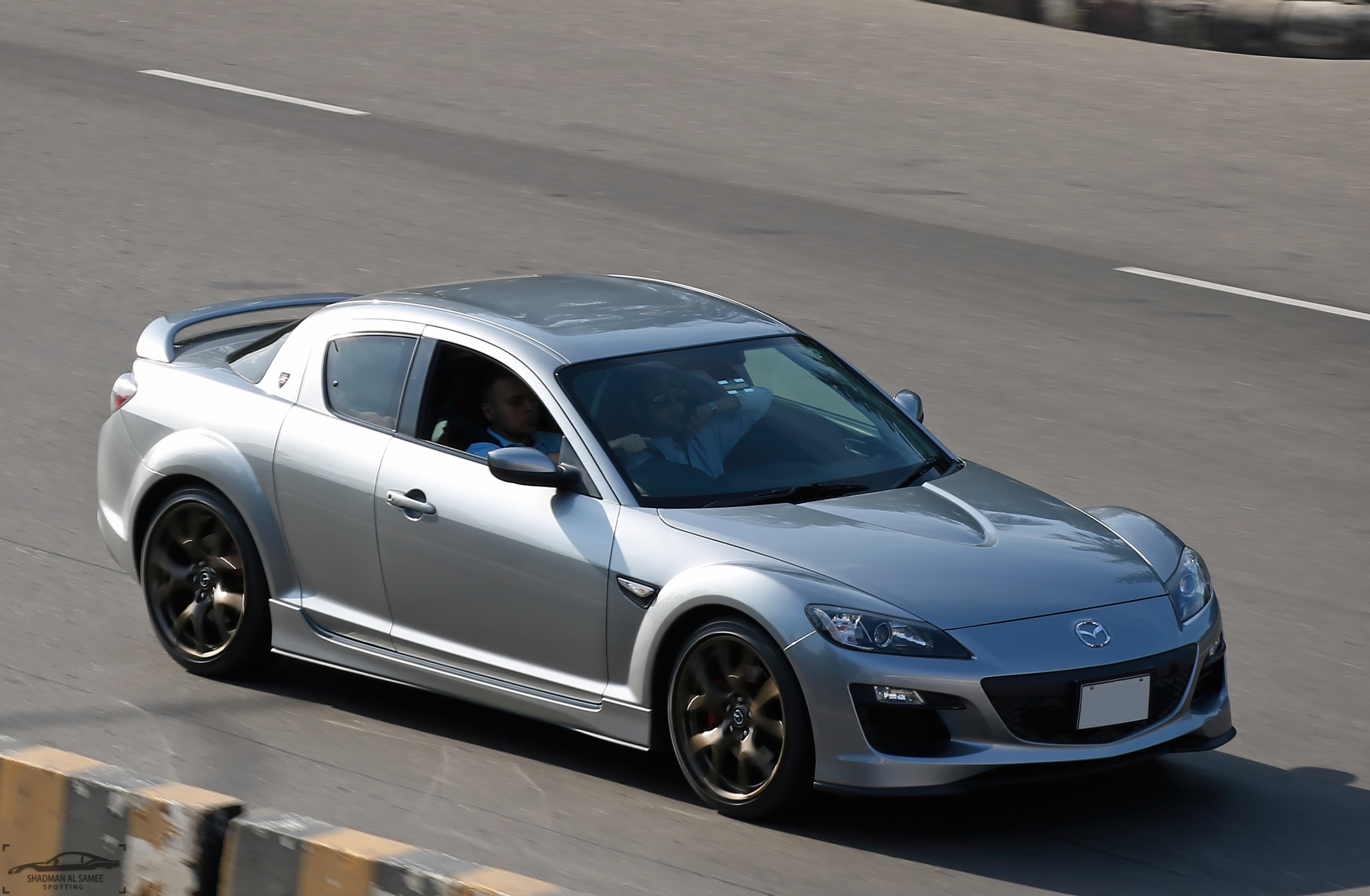
Mazda RX-8 Spirit-R

The Spirit R is a limited-edition RX-8 produced to mark the end of the model's production run. Its name is a direct callback to the RX-7 Spirit R, the final special edition of the preceding RX-7, produced in 2002. Like that car, the RX-8 Spirit R features red Recaro bucket seats, Bilstein dampers, forged alloy wheels, and red brake calipers — a deliberate echo of the earlier model's specification. The Spirit R went on sale November 24, 2011, at all Mazda and Mazda Anfini dealerships throughout Japan, with an initial production target of 1,000 units. Demand significantly exceeded expectations, and in April 2012 Mazda announced it would extend production by an additional 1,000 units, bringing the approximate total to 2,000. The six-speed manual version proved most popular, accounting for 66 percent of orders.

The manual-transmission Spirit R is based on the RX-8 Type RS, while the automatic-transmission version is based on the Type E (the Japanese-market equivalents of the North American R3 and Grand Touring trims, respectively). Standard equipment across both variants included Spirit R badging, black bezels on the headlights, red front and rear brake calipers and piano-black transmission tunnel trim.

The manual model added the same Recaro bucket seat shell used in the Type RS and R3, re-trimmed with Spirit R–exclusive red and black leather and fabric on the side bolsters, along with a hard suspension with Bilstein dampers, aero parts, an aluminum pedal set, a leather-wrapped shift knob with red stitching, and 19-inch forged aluminum wheels in a Spirit R–exclusive bronze with 225/40R19 tires. The automatic model was instead equipped with black leather power seats with red stitching featuring 8-way adjustment and a memory function, heated front seats, a sports suspension with larger brakes, and 18-inch alloy wheels in gunmetal with 225/45R18 tires. Automatic models could also be specified with the manual model's Recaro bucket seats and 19-inch wheels.

Body color choices were limited to Aluminum Metallic, Sparkling Black Mica, and Crystal White Pearl Mica. The latter was a special-order color carrying a ¥31,500 surcharge; orders were split nearly equally among the three colors. The manual model was priced at ¥3,250,000 and the automatic at ¥3,120,000.

The Spirit R's launch coincided with Mazda's year-long celebration of the 20th anniversary of the 787B's victory at the 1991 24 Hours of Le Mans — the only overall win at Le Mans by a car powered by a rotary engine. Following the Spirit R's introduction, the RX-8 lineup was reduced to just the Spirit R and the base Type G automatic. Production of the rotary engine ended on June 21, 2012, followed by the end of RX-8 assembly on June 22, 2012, at Mazda's Ujina plant in Hiroshima.

With the Spirit R's production ending in June 2012, the era of the purely combustion-driven rotary engine in a production car effectively came to a close. Mazda's subsequent rotary development has focused exclusively on electrified applications, beginning with the MX-30 e-Skyactiv R-EV, making the Spirit R almost certainly the last car to be powered by a rotary engine alone.

=== End of production ===
Sales of the RX-8 ended in 2010 in Europe after failing to meet the region's emission standards.

The production of the RX-8 ended in 2012 in Japan; Mazda had produced 192,094 units since 2003. Production of the rotary engine ended on June 21, 2012, followed by the end of RX-8 assembly on June 22, 2012, at Mazda's Ujina, Hiroshima plant.

== Engines ==
Model	Engine	Displacement	Power	Torque	0–100 km/h (0–62 mph)	Top speed	CO_{2} emission (g/km)
Renesis 4-Port	2-Rotor	1308 cc	192 hp (143 kW; 195 PS) at 7,000 rpm	198 N⋅m (146 lbf⋅ft) at 5,000 rpm	7.2 s	139 mph (224 km/h)	284
Renesis 6-Port	2-Rotor	1308 cc	231 hp (172 kW; 234 PS) at 8,200 rpm	212 N⋅m (156 lbf⋅ft) at 5,500 rpm	6.4 s	146 mph (235 km/h)	284
Renesis II 4-Port	2-Rotor	1308 cc	212 hp (158 kW; 215 PS) at 7,500 rpm	216 N⋅m (159 lbf⋅ft) at 5,500 rpm	7.2 s	140 mph (230 km/h)	258
Renesis II 6-Port	2-Rotor	1308 cc	232 hp (173 kW; 235 PS) at 8,500 rpm	216 N⋅m (159 lbf⋅ft) at 5,500 rpm	6.3 s	147 mph (237 km/h)	299

== Warranty extension program ==
Mazda North American Operations extended the engine warranty on all model year 2004–2008 RX-8s. The warranty extension covered only the engine core, consisting of the rotor housing and internal parts, as well as the seals and gaskets. It did not include clutch or drivetrain (transmission or differential). An extended engine warranty for emissions was not offered in any other RX-8 markets.

== Motorsport ==
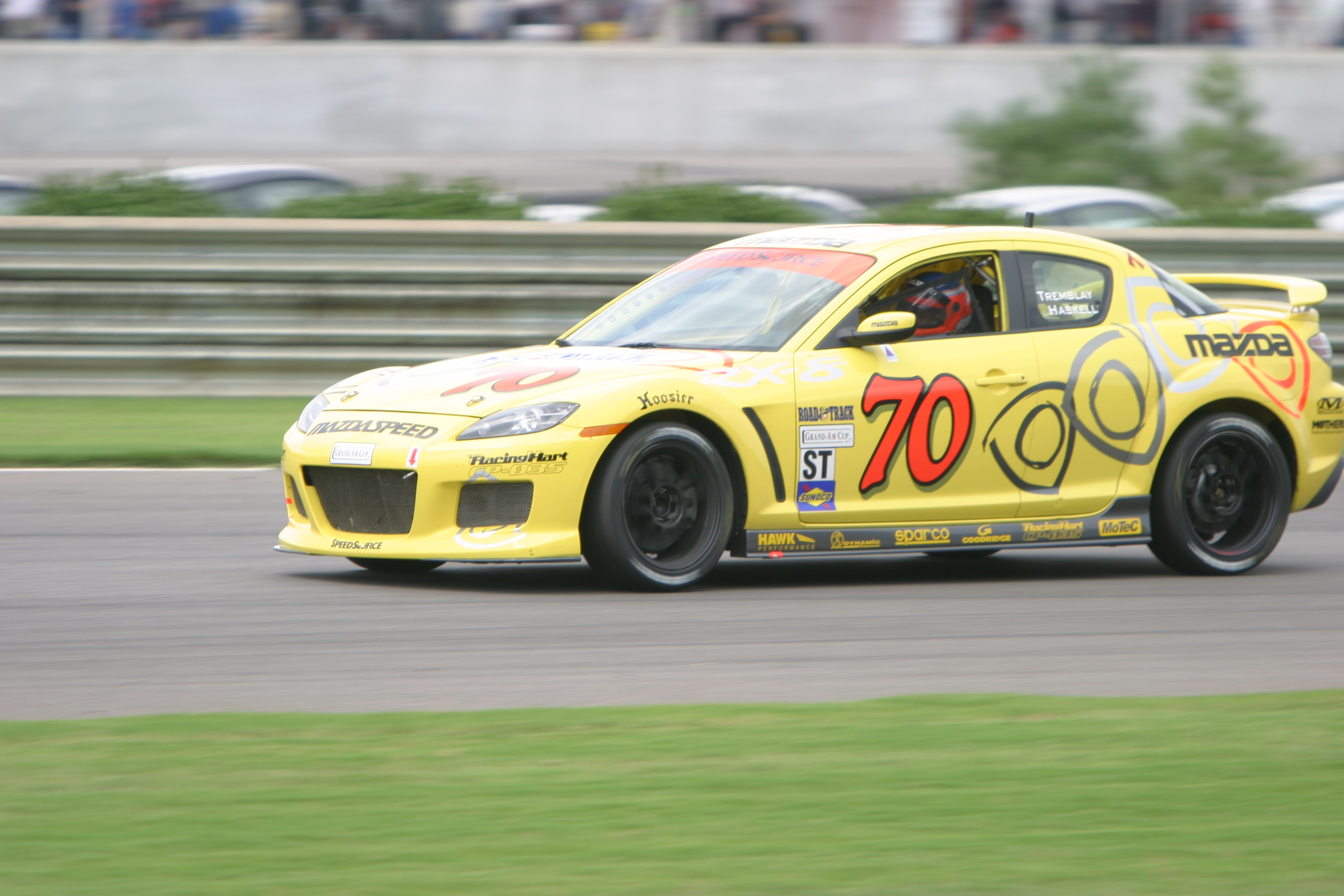
RX-8 competing in a Grand-Am Cup race in 2006

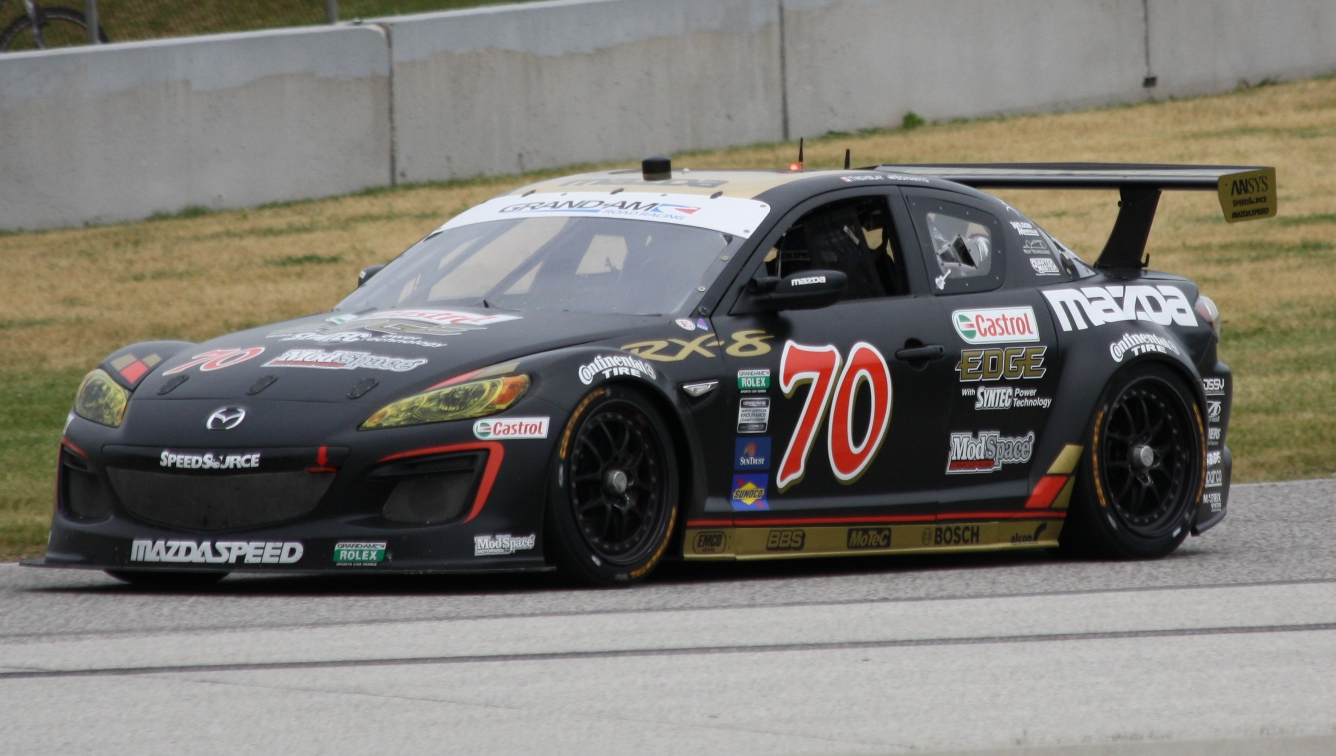
RX-8 GTD competing in a Grand-Am race in 2010

The RX-8 has been campaigned and used in various racing series by privateers. It has seen a considerable amount of success, the most prominent of which being the 2008 and 2010 24 Hours of Daytona GT-class wins campaigned by SpeedSource Race Engineering. This victory also marks the 23rd endurance race win at Daytona by a Mazda rotary-powered race car. While the cars are powered by the 20B rotary engines, the car is in fact built on a tube frame chassis and not on the production car.

Ryan Eversley won both races of the 2010 SCCA World Challenge Mid-Ohio Grand Prix in the touring car class.

Other racing series include the KONI Challenge Series in the Street Tuner class. In the UK, the RX-8 featured in the Mazda sponsored "Formula Women" series (2004), which involved all women drivers with slightly modified RX-8s, and the RX-8 was also campaigned successfully in the Britcar series endurance races (2005/2006). In Belgium, Mazda are currently sponsoring an RX-8 silhouette racer in the GT series. The car also won the IMSA Continental Tire Sports Car Challenge in 2005.

In 2014 the North Island Mazda Rotary Racing Association in New Zealand launched a RX-8 category in its Pro7 racing series which is the oldest MotorSport NZ sanctioned series in NZ. The RX-8's now dominate this racing series and is competed in the North and South Islands as well as a NZ championship. The category was renamed in 2019 to the Mazda Racing Series and now some of the largest grids in the country.

In 2019, the Classic Sports Car Club in the UK launched the RX-8 Trophy for road legal first generation Mazda RX-8's. Developed in two years, the class was designed to provide the cheapest way of going racing in a performance car. The class stipulates that the RX-8 entering the race must have a valid MOT and retain creature comforts such as air con, heater and stereo, therefore allowing the car to be used as a daily driver, as well as to and from the race track.

The RX-8 has been used occasionally for professional drifting (Formula Drift), with drivers like Masao Suenaga from Japan, "Mad" Mike Whiddett from New Zealand, and Kyle Mohan from the USA choosing the develop the chassis each to suit their own goals.

== Awards ==
As of October 2006 the RX-8 has won 37 international motoring awards including 2003 International Engine of the Year, the 2003 Japanese Car of the Year, Australia's Wheels magazine's Car of the Year for 2003, the 2004 Singapore Car of the Year, the 2004 U.S. Best Sports Car, and several UK Best Car Awards. It was named on Car and Driver magazine's Ten Best list for 2004, 2005, and 2006. It also took home first place on Car and Driver's "Four of a Kind" comparison test. 2010 RX-8 placed third out of seven on Car and Driver's The Best-Handling Car in America for Less Than $100,000. It was also awarded the Editors' Choice Award by Grassroots Motorsports in 2003.

== Sources ==
- "2009 MAZDA RX-8: Further Evolution for the Rotary Revolution". Mazda USA. Archived from the original on 2008-02-21.
- "Mazda RX-8 Hydrogen rotary engine". Ford Media. Archived from the original on 25 April 2006.
- "Mazda Adds 6-Speed Automatic and New Shinka Package for 2006 RX-8". Fast-Autos.net. Archived from the original on 22 August 2006.
- "Future Products – Mazda". AutoWeek. Archived from the original on September 29, 2007.
- "Mazda RX-9 could use 1.6-litre 16X rotary engine".
