= Justin Bell =

British racecar driver

- Bell in 2016
- Born: Justin Derek Bell; 23 February 1968 (age 58); Rustington, Sussex, England
- Occupations: Racing driver TV and web host
- Categorisation: FIA Gold (until 2018); FIA Silver (2019–)
- Years active: 1989—present
- Children: Oliver Bell and Tallulah Bell
- Parent(s): Derek Bell and Misti Bell

Justin Derek Bell (born 23 February 1968) is a British racing driver who, after a successful career behind the wheel, transitioned into the media world in front of the camera and established himself as one of the top US-based automotive content hosts. He is the son of Derek Bell.

== Career ==
Like many successful car racers, Bell nurtured and developed his passion for speed and competitive racing at an early age. With natural talent and the encouragement of his father Derek Bell, a five-time Le Mans 24 hours winner, he started out fast and got faster, and soon began carving his own place in history. Since beginning his career in 1988, Bell has achieved many significant racing accomplishments, including the 1997 FIA GT2 Championship, winning the 24 Hours of Le Mans GT2 class in 1998 and second-place finishes in Le Mans and Daytona, and a pair of SCCA Trans-Am wins.

Along the way, Bell raced for major car manufacturers including Saab, Peugeot, Porsche, BMW, Dodge and General Motors. For Dodge Viper, he won the 1997 FIA GT2 world championship and the GT2 class at Le Mans in 1998. In 2000, Bell signed with General Motors as a driver for the factory Corvette Racing team, finishing second in the Daytona 24 Hours, the 24 Hours of Le Mans and Petit Le Mans.

Early in his career, as Bell made consistent progress through a variety of racing categories, all the while appearing in various television programs. In 1993, he was co-host of the motor sports television program 555 Performance World, which ran on Asia's largest satellite network Star TV and was seen by over 80 million viewers. This led to him hosting a six-part series, The International Young Driver of the Year on BBC television.

Since 2005, Bell has worked frequently with Speed Channel (now Fox Sports 1) as a host of various live and format based TV shows, such as the Barrett Jackson Auctions, American Le Mans Series, Grand American Racing, IMSA WeatherTech SportsCar Championship, Test Drive and Shut up and Drive.

Bell co-founded Torque Media Group in 2018 with Tommy Kendall and Jason Jacobson. The trio created The Torque Show as a branded live stream show to support Michelin in the IMSA Series. Evolving into a chat show-style format, Bell and Kendall interview people in the racing world, attracting a wide audience on their Facebook Live channel.

Another series integrated into The Torque Show is 'The Love of Cars' presented by Hagerty, which has seen guests such as Jay Leno, Patrick Dempsey and Danny Trejo.

Drawing on their experience in Live sports broadcasting, and led by the producing talents of Jason Jacobson, the company branched out into live event hosting with the Audrain Newport Concours and Motorweek and the honor of hosting and producing the livestream for the Pebble beach Concours d'Elegance in 2021.

== Other career milestones ==
Bell and his father raced together in the 1992 24 Hours of Le Mans and the 1995 24 Hours of Le Mans. He tried to qualify for the 1996 Indianapolis 500 in a four year old Lola chassis. Later in 1997, he won the FIA GT championship in the GT2 class in a Dodge Viper GTS-R, racing for Team Oreca.

From 2000 to 2004, Bell had his own racing school which trained the pupils with Chevrolet Corvette cars.

In 2001-2003, Bell raced in the Trans Am Series, winning two major races at Houston and Mazda Raceway Laguna Seca and took the Rookie of the Year title.

In 2009, Bell debuted as the driving instructor for the celebrities on The Jay Leno Show where he also interviewed the celebrity for the website.

== Motorsports career results ==
=== Complete 24 Hours of Le Mans results ===
Year	Team	Co-Drivers	Car	Class	Laps	Pos.	Class Pos.
1991	(Netherlands) Euro Racing	(Japan) Shunji Kasuya	Spice SE88P	C2	-	DNQ	DNQ
1992	(United Kingdom) ADA Engineering	(United Kingdom) Tiff Needell (United Kingdom) Derek Bell	Porsche 962C GTi	C3	284	12th	5th
1994	(France) Rent-A-Car Racing Team (Belgium) Luigi Racing	(France) René Arnoux (France) Bertrand Balas	Dodge Viper RT/10	LM GT1	273	12th	3rd
1995	(United Kingdom) Harrods Mach One Racing (United Kingdom) David Price Racing	(United Kingdom) Andy Wallace (United Kingdom) Derek Bell	McLaren F1 GTR	GT1	296	3rd	2nd
1996	(France) Viper Team Oreca	(France) Dominique Dupuy (United Kingdom) Perry McCarthy	Chrysler Viper GTS-R	GT1	96	DNF	DNF
1997	(France) Viper Team Oreca	(France) Pierre Yver (United States) John Morton	Chrysler Viper GTS-R	GT2	278	14th	5th
1998	(France) Viper Team Oreca	(United States) David Donohue (Italy) Luca Drudi	Chrysler Viper GTS-R	GT2	317	11th	1st
1999	(France) Viper Team Oreca	(United States) Tommy Archer (Belgium) Marc Duez	Chrysler Viper GTS-R	GT2	318	12th	2nd
2000	(United States) Corvette Racing	(Canada) Ron Fellows (United States) Chris Kneifel	Chevrolet Corvette C5R	LM GTS	326	11th	4th

=== Complete Japanese Touring Car Championship (1994-) results ===
Year	Team	Car	1	2	3	4	5	6	7	8	9	10	11	12	13	14	15	16	DC	Pts
1995	HKS Opel Team Japan	Opel Vectra	FUJ; 1 NC	FUJ; 2 Ret	SUG; 1; 14	SUG; 2; 7	TOK; 1; 15	TOK; 2; 14	SUZ; 1; 10	SUZ; 2 Ret	MIN; 1; 18	MIN; 2; 16	AID; 1; 7	AID; 2; 6	SEN; 1; 5	SEN; 2; 4	FUJ; 1; 7	FUJ; 2; 10	11th	32

=== IRL IndyCar Series ===
Year	Team	Chassis	No.	Engine	1	2	3	Rank	Points	Ref
1996	Tempero–Giuffre Racing	Lola T92	15	Buick	WDW	PHX	INDY; Wth	-	0	
