= 1994 24 Hours of Daytona =

Previous: 1993	Next: 1995
Index: Races | Winners

Track map of Daytona International Speedway

The 1994 Rolex 24 at Daytona was a 24-hour endurance sports car race held on February 5–6, 1994 at the Daytona International Speedway road course. The race served as the opening round of the 1994 IMSA GT Championship.

Victory overall and in the GTS class went to the No. 76 Cunningham Racing Nissan 300ZX Turbo driven by Scott Pruett, Butch Leitzinger, Paul Gentilozzi, and Steve Millen. Victory in the WSC class went to the No. 2 Brix Racing Spice AK93 driven by Jeremy Dale, Ruggero Melgrati, Bob Schader, and Price Cobb. Victory in the GTU class went to the No. 65 Heico Motorsports Porsche 964 Carrera RSR driven by Ulli Richter, Karl-Heinz Wlazik, Dirk Ebeling, and Gunter Döbler.

== Race results ==
Class winners in bold.

Pos	Class	No	Team	Drivers	Car	Laps
1	**GTS**	**76**	(United States) **Cunningham Racing**	(United States) **Scott Pruett** (United States) **Butch Leitzinger** (United States) **Paul Gentilozzi** (New Zealand) **Steve Millen**	**Nissan 300ZX Turbo**	**707**
2	GTS	86	(France) Larbre Compétition	(France) Bob Wollek (France) Dominique Dupuy (Spain) Jesús Pareja (Germany) Jürgen Barth	Porsche 964 Turbo	683
3	**GTU**	**65**	(Germany) **Heico Competition**	(Germany) **Ulli Richter** (Germany) **Karl-Heinz Wlazik** (Germany) **Dirk Ebeling** (Germany) **Gunter Döbler**	**Porsche 964 Carrera RSR**	**671**
4	GTU	02	(United States) Rohr Corporation	(Germany) Frank Katthöfer (Germany) Bernd Mayländer (Germany) Harald Grohs (United States) Mark Sandridge	Porsche 964 Carrera RSR	670
5	GTS	6	(United States) Brix Racing	(United States) Tommy Riggins (United States) R. K. Smith (United States) Price Cobb (United States) Irv Hoerr	Oldsmobile Cutlass Supreme	665
6	GTU	00	(Germany) Konrad Motorsport	(Netherlands) Cor Euser (Brazil) Antônio Hermann (Brazil) Maurizio Sandro Sala (Austria) Franz Konrad	Porsche 964 Carrera RSR	664
7	GTS	94	(United States) Morrison Motorsports	(United States) John Heinricy (United States) Andy Pilgrim (United States) Stu Hayner (United States) Boris Said	Chevrolet Corvette	658
8	GTU	79	(Germany) Freisinger Motorsport	(Germany) Edgar Dören (Italy) Gualtiero Garibaldi (Italy) Luigino Pagotto (Switzerland) Sandro Angelastri	Porsche 964 Carrera RSR	656
9	**WSC**	**2**	(United States) **Brix Racing**	(Canada) **Jeremy Dale** (Italy) **Ruggero Melgrati** (United States) **Bob Schader** (United States) **Price Cobb**	**Spice AK93**	**651**
10	WSC	63	(United States) Downing/Atlanta Racing	(South Africa) Wayne Taylor (United States) Hugh Fuller (United States) Charles Morgan (United States) Jim Downing	Kudzu DG-3 WSC	650
11	GTS	5	(United States) Brix Racing	(United States) John Fergus (United States) Mark Dismore (United States) Tommy Riggins (United States) Darin Brassfield	Oldsmobile Cutlass Supreme	634
12	GTS	99	(Germany) Konrad Motorsport	(United States) Nick Ham (Sweden) Mikael Gustavsson (Hungary) Kalman Bodis (Brazil) Maurizio Sandro Sala (Austria) Franz Konrad (Germany) Bernd Netzeband	Porsche 911 Turbo	632
13	GTU	77	(United States) Team Gunnar	(United States) Jay Cochran (France) Ferdinand de Lesseps (France) Michel Aouate	Porsche 911 Turbo	630
14	GTU	73	(United States) Jack Lewis Enterprises Ltd.	(United States) Jack Lewis (United States) John Bourassa (United States) Bob Beasley (United States) Joe Cogbill	Porsche 911 Carrera RSR	613
15	GTU	37	(Switzerland) Ecurie Biennoise	(Switzerland) Enzo Calderari (Switzerland) Lilian Bryner (Italy) Renato Mastropietro (Italy) Ruggero Grassi	Porsche 911 Carrera RSR	612
16	GTU	62	(United States) Shelton Sports Cars	(Belgium) Didier Theys (United States) Steve Shelton (United States) Art Coia (United States) Tom Shelton	Ferrari 348 GTC	599
17	GTU	0	(United States) Champion Porsche/Leigh Miller Racing	(United States) Leigh Miller (Canada) Kat Teasdale (Canada) John Graham (United States) Arthur Porter	Porsche 968	584
18	GTS	21	(United States) Kent Painter	(United States) Vic Rice (United Kingdom) Robert Nearn (United Kingdom) David Gooding (Italy) Mauro Borella	Chevrolet Camaro	541
19	GTS	51	(United States) Bruce Trenery	(Australia) Andrew Osman (United States) Bruce Trenery (United Kingdom) Jeffrey Pattinson (Germany) Thomas Bscher	Oldsmobile Cutlass	538
20	GTU	08	(Japan) Nissan Motorsports	(Japan) Syunji Kasuya (Japan) Takamasa Nakagawa (Sweden) Steven Andskär	Nissan Skyline GT-R	532
21	GTS	31	(United States) Kent Painter	(France) Guy Kuster (United States) Joaquin DeSoto (United Kingdom) John Starkey (United States) Kent Painter	Chevrolet Camaro	524
22	GTS	71	(United States) Churchill Transport	(Canada) Jerry Churchill (Canada) Randy Churchill (United States) Ken Bupp (United States) Guy Church	Oldsmobile Cutlass	519
23	GTU	32	(Colombia) Botero Racing Team	(New Zealand) Rob Wilson (Colombia) Felipe Solano (Guatemala) Luis Rico (Panama) Lucio Bernal (Angola) Luis Alvun	Mazda MX-6	498
24	GTS	13	(United States) Anthony Puleo	(United States) Anthony Puleo (United States) Craig Stone (United States) Ray Irwin (Philippines) Daniel Urrutia	Chevrolet Camaro	490
25 DNF	GTS	59	(United States) Brumos Racing	(Germany) Walter Röhrl (United States) Hurley Haywood (United States) Danny Sullivan (Germany) Hans-Joachim Stuck	Porsche 964 Turbo	467
26	GTU	19	(United States) Bill Auberlen	(United States) Bill Auberlen (United States) Les Lindley (United States) Ron Finger (United States) Mike Sheehan	Mazda RX-7	462
27	GTS	87	(United States) John Annis	(United States) John Annis (United States) Louis Beall (United States) Claude Lawrence (United States) Chris Funk	Chevrolet Camaro	447
28 DNF	GTS	25	(United States) Kreider Racing, Inc.	(United States) Scott Watkins (United States) Dale Kreider (Faroe Islands) Nort Northam (Luxembourg) Brian DeVries	Oldsmobile Cutlass	428
29	GTU	57	(United States) Kryderacing	(United States) Reed Kryder (United States) Tommy Miller (United States) Larry Ray (Italy) Frank Del Vecchio	Nissan 240SX	413
30 DNF	WSC	45	(United States) Scandia Motorsports	(United States) Lon Bender (United States) Steve Fossett (Germany) Andreas Fuchs (United States) Don Bell	Kudzu DG-2 WSC	410
31 DNF	GTU	69	(Germany) Gustl Spreng Racing	(Germany) Gustl Spreng (Germany) Fritz Müller (Germany) Kersten Jodexnis	Porsche 964 Carrera RSR	394
32 DNF	GTU	68	(United States) Charles Coker Jr.	(United States) Arthur Pilla (United States) Hugh Johnson (United States) Joe Danaher (United States) Charles Coker	Porsche 944 Turbo	390
33	GTS	93	(United States) Morrison Motorsports	(United States) Jim Minneker (United States) Jeff Nowicki (United States) Scott Allman (Canada) Ken Wilden	Chevrolet Corvette	390
34 DNF	GTU	52	(Italy) Angelo Cilli	(United States) David Murry (Italy) Angelo Cilli (United States) Tammy Jo Kirk (United States) Anthony Lazzaro	Porsche 911	372
35 DNF	GTU	96	(United States) John Mirro	(United States) Don Knowles (United States) John Mirro (United States) Rick Sutherland (United States) Dirk Layer	Nissan 240SX	359
36 DNF	GTU	4	(Peru) Dibos Racing	(Peru) Juan Dibos (Peru) Eduardo Dibós Chappuis (Peru) Raúl Orlandini (United States) Dan Robson	Mazda RX-7	359
37 DNF	GTU	48	(United Kingdom) Chamberlain Engineering	(Niger) Hilton Cowie (Republic of Ireland) Stephen Watson (South Africa) George Fouché	Lotus Esprit Sport 3	354
38	GTU	8	(Ecuador) Saeta Racing	(Singapore) Henry Taleb (United States) Terry Andrews (Malta) Jean-Pierre Michelet (Ecuador) Wilson Amador	Nissan 300ZX	352
39	WSC	36	(United States) Pegasus Racing	(United States) Paul Dallenbach (Germany) Oliver Kuttner	Pegasus	343
40 DNF	WSC	16	(United States) Dyson Racing	(United Kingdom) James Weaver (United States) Rob Dyson (United States) Scott Sharp (United States) John Paul Jr.	Spice DR-3	339
41 DNF	GTS	75	(United States) Cunningham Racing	(New Zealand) Steve Millen (United States) John Morton (United States) Johnny O'Connell	Nissan 300ZX Turbo	283
42 DNF	GTU	82	(United States) Wendy's Racing Team	(United States) Dick Greer (United States) Peter Uria (United States) Al Bacon (United States) Mike Mees	Mazda RX-7	258
43 DNF	GTS	35	(United States) Bill McDill	(United States) Richard McDill (United States) Tom Juckette (United States) Bill McDill	Chevrolet Camaro	253
44 DNF	GTU	26	(United States) Alex Job Racing	(United States) Jim Pace (United States) Mike Smith (United States) Charles Slater (United States) Butch Hamlet	Porsche 911	238
45 DNF	WSC	9	(United States) Auto Toy Store, Inc.	(Australia) Geoff Brabham (United Kingdom) Derek Bell (United Kingdom) Andy Wallace (United States) Morris Shirazi	Spice SE89P	223
46 DNF	WSC	44	(United States) Scandia Motorsports	(Spain) Fermín Vélez (Canada) Ross Bentley (United States) Tim McAdam (United States) Andy Evans	Spice WSC94	223
47	GTS	3	(United States) O'Brien Motorsports, Inc.	(United States) Linda Pobst (United States) Margy Eatwell (United States) Tami Rai Busby (Canada) Kat Teasdale (United States) Leigh O'Brien	Chevrolet Camaro	219
48 DNF	GTU	18	(United States) Champion Porsche/Leigh Miller Racing	(United States) Roger Schramm (United States) Paul Lewis (United States) Chuck Goldsborough (Canada) Ludwig Heimrath Jr.	Porsche 944 Turbo	207
49 DNF	GTU	27	(Germany) Porsche Club EV	(Germany) Olaf Manthey (Germany) Oliver Mathai (Germany) Wolfgang Mathai	Porsche 911 Carrera RSR	188
50 DNF	GTU	33	(United States) Ralph Thomas	(United States) Douglas Campbell (United States) Ralph Thomas (United States) Frank Jackson	Mazda RX-7	183
51 DNF	GTS	72	(United States) Champion Porsche	(Canada) Bill Adam (Argentina) Juan Manuel Fangio II (United Kingdom) Brian Redman (United States) Mike Peters	Porsche 964 Turbo	177
52 DNF	GTU	70	(United States) Dynamic Air Conditioning	(United States) Bill Ferran (United States) Bruce Jones (United States) Ray Hendricks (United States) Jay Kjoller	Porsche 911	172
53 DNF	GTU	42	(Germany) Rudolf Brent	(Germany) Stig Amthor (Switzerland) Rolf Kuhn (Belgium) Philippe de Craene (Belgium) Philippe Olczyk	Porsche 911 Carrera RSR	171
54 DNF	WSC	11	(United States) Tony Kester	(United States) Stan Cleva (Canada) Rob Mingay (United States) Joseph Hamilton (United States) Tony Kester	Tiga GT286 Spyder	160
55	GTS	23	(United States) Curren Motorsports	(United States) Tom Curren (Canada) Ed de Long (United States) Robert Borders	Oldsmobile Cutlass	153
56 DNF	GTS	50	(United States) Overbagh Racing	(United States) Oma Kimbrough (United States) David Kicak (United States) Robert McElheny (United States) Max Schmidt (United States) C. J. Johnson (United States) Hoyt Overbagh (United States) Mark Montgomery	Chevrolet Camaro	61
57 DNF	GTU	78	(United States) Pettit Racing	(United States) Cameron Worth (United States) Bill Weston	Mazda RX-7	58
58 DNF	GTU	24	(Ecuador) Saeta Racing	(Ecuador) Alfonso Darquea (Argentina) Carlos Paredas (Djibouti) Macelo Darquea (Brazil) Andres Izurieta (United States) Henry Bradley	Toyota Corolla	51
59 DNF	GTS	04	(United States) Art Cross	(United States) Art Cross (United States) Len McCue (United States) Jim Christ (United States) Kerry Hitt (United States) Mark Kennedy	Chevrolet Camaro	31
60 DNF	GTU	58	(United States) Pro Technic Racing	(Honduras) Sam Shalala (Canada) Ernie Lader (Indonesia) Omar Daniel (United States) Alex Tradd (United States) Frank Beard	Porsche 911	19
61 DNF	GTU	91	(United States) Mel A. Butt	(United States) C. Lorin Hicks (United States) Mel Butt (United States) Tommy Johnson (United States) Ronald Zitza	Porsche 911	12
62 DNF	GTU	07	(Canada) Commercial Motorsports	(Canada) Rick Bye (Canada) Harry Hatch (Canada) Raymond David	Porsche 968 Turbo	8
DNS	GTU	01	(United States) Rohr Corporation	(United States) Jochen Rohr (United States) John O'Steen (United States) Larry Schumacher (United States) Jeff Zwart	Porsche 964 Carrera RSR	-
DNS	GTU	47	(United Kingdom) Chamberlain Engineering	(Norway) Thorkild Thyrring (United States) Doc Bundy (Sweden) Jürgen Lässig (United Kingdom) Harry Nuttall	Lotus Esprit Sport 3	-
DNS	GTU	61		(United States) Danny Marshall (United States) John Biggs (United States) Weldon Scrogham (United States) Cole Scrogham (United States) Bob Rost	Porsche 964 Carrera	-
