= Dan Drinan =

American racing driver

Dan Drinan (born July 4, 1960) is an American sprint car driver from Indianapolis who failed on three separate attempts to qualify for the Indianapolis 500. His first attempt came in 1996, the first year that the Indy Racing League sanctioned the race. Drinan crashed his 1991 Lola chassis, the oldest chassis entered as a potential qualifier, during practice although it is unlikely that his outdated chassis and Buick engine could have produced the speed necessary to make the field. Drinan bruised his lung and fractured his foot in the crash. He returned in 1998 and his Mann Motorsports Dallara again failed to find the necessary speed to make the field. His final attempt was in 2000, when he was given an outdated Dallara and a small crew by Hemelgarn Racing, but the car never handled properly and Drinan again crashed during practice, preventing him from qualifying.

Drinan has continued to be a top level competitor in USAC sprint car and midget racing.

After leaving the IWX team through force, Drinan now is supporting his young son in his own racing program Danny Drinan Jr who has promising potential for the future to come. In 2013–2016, Drinan and his son competed in USAC & QMA quarter midget competition in a creation out of Drinan's shop called the "F1 Shark" and had great success, winning a number of races. His son then moved on to run 600CC micro sprints after that.

== IRL IndyCar Series ==
Year	Team	Chassis	No.	Engine	1	2	3	4	5	6	7	8	9	10	11	Rank	Points	Ref
1996	Blueprint Racing	Lola T93	36	Menard	WDW	PHX; Wth										-	0	
1996	Loop Hole Racing	Lola T93	36	Menard			INDY; DNQ									-	0	
1998	D. B. Mann Motorsports	Dallara IR8	24	Oldsmobile	WDW	PHX	INDY; DNQ	TEX	NHS	DOV	CLT	PIK	ATL	TEX	LSV	-	0	
2000	Hemelgarn Racing	Dallara IR8	48	Oldsmobile	WDW	PHX	LSV	INDY; DNQ	TEX	PIK	ATL	KTY	TEX			-	0	
