= 1996 Indy Racing League =

American auto racing season

1996 Indy Racing League season
- Indy Racing League

Season
- Races: 3
- Start date: January 27
- End date: May 26

Awards
- Drivers' champion: (United States) Buzz Calkins (United States) Scott Sharp
- Indianapolis 500 winner: (United States) Buddy Lazier

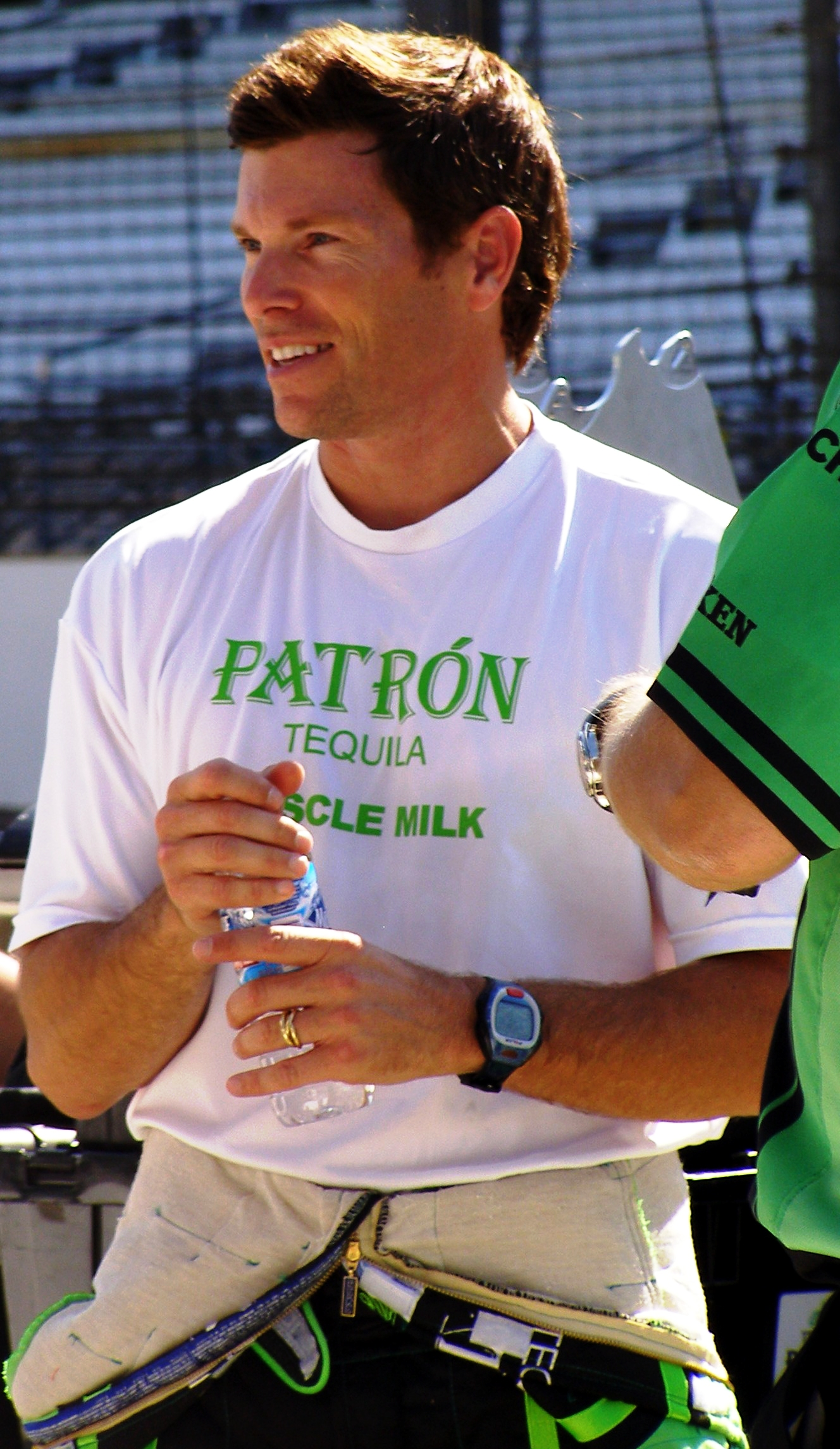
Buzz Calkins won his first Drivers' Championship while Scott Sharp (pictured here in 2007) became co-champion in the championship despite Calkins having one victory.

The 1996 Indy Racing League was the first season in the history of the series, which was created and announced on March 11, 1994, by the Indianapolis Motor Speedway (IMS), as a supplementary series to the established Indy Car World Series sanctioned by Championship Auto Racing Teams (CART) since 1979. It consisted of only three races, as the season concluded with the 80th Indianapolis 500 in May. Walt Disney World Speedway was completed in time to host the first ever event of the Indy Racing League, and Phoenix International Raceway switched alliances from CART to the IRL, in order to host the second event of the season. At the conclusion of the three-race schedule, Scott Sharp and Buzz Calkins ended up tied for first place in the championship. With no tiebreaker rule in place, the two drivers were declared co-champions. The creation of IRL and the opposition of CART's teams and drivers to take part in it marked the start of 'the Split', a 12-year period of competition between rival series at the top level of American open-wheel car racing that had lasting negative effects on the sport.

== Series news ==
The series was the initiative of IMS president Tony George, who had left the CART Board of Directors in January 1994 after disagreements over the direction of Indy car racing, and its potential effect on the Indianapolis 500. The new championship would feature the marquee race, effectively removing it from the CART schedule, and was to be sanctioned by the United States Auto Club, racing exclusively on oval tracks as a response to its perceived decline in recent Indy Car seasons. The Indy Racing League name was revealed on July 8, 1994, and its first set of rules was published later that year, but it encountered criticism and resistance from the established team owners that formed CART and its drivers, who derided the concept as a 'power grab' attempt from George.

On January 23, 1995, the IRL announced that the Indy 200 at Walt Disney World Speedway would host the first event of the series on January 27, 1996, on a new oval track at the Magic Kingdom at Walt Disney World Resort in Orlando, Florida. On April 3, the IRL announced that Phoenix International Raceway, which would switch alliances from CART to IRL, and the then-under construction Las Vegas Motor Speedway would be on the 1996 schedule, its dates being finalized 10 days later. On May 30, 1995, New Hampshire Motor Speedway also switched alliances from CART to IRL, completing the five races that would be held in 1996. Initially, IRL officials hoped that competitors from the rival CART series would choose to race in some or all of the IRL events, since there were no foreseen conflicts in their respective schedules.

Talks between both series in early 1995 resulted in the former delaying its new rules for 1997, instead adopting frozen regulations with 1995-and-older CART chassis with a fixed limit on how much a team could spend on its combination. However, CART would later adopt a lower-downforce philosophy for their new 1996 chassis that was similar to the delayed IRL rules (except for the initially planned engine downsizing), and announced a 1996 schedule that had multiple conflicts with the previously announced IRL dates. The race at Road America was scheduled for the same day as the IRL event at Loudon, while the races at Rio and Australia were bookended around the IRL race at Phoenix, creating an impossible travel situation.

In a controversial move, on July 3, 1995, it was announced that the top 25 drivers in IRL points would secure guaranteed starting positions for the 1996 Indianapolis 500. The '25/8 rule', intended to encourage participation at Orlando and Phoenix, left only eight positions open for at-large competitors, which was interpreted by most CART teams as a de facto 'lock out' for its 26-car field. As a result, CART would later schedule a second 500-mile race at Michigan International Speedway in direct competition with the Indianapolis 500, and established that teams would be stripped of their voting rights in the Board of Directors if they competed in an IRL event. Therefore, almost all of CART's established drivers and teams stayed away from the upstart series, with Galles and Walker fielding additional cars at the Indy 500 without its regular drivers, in deference to their sponsors.

The IRL, nonetheless, had its sights on becoming a low-cost alternative for American drivers over the influx of foreign drivers attracted by CART's increasing road racing focus, and for short-track open-wheel stars that had found the sport too expensive to compete in previous seasons, or had searched for a more viable option in stock-car racing. Only 11 of the 33 starters from the 1995 Indianapolis 500 were featured in the 1996 event, which had one Indy 500 champion (Arie Luyendyk), two former race winners, and only two full-time teams and drivers from the 1995 season. The rest of the IRL field was composed of new entrants, part-time drivers and a large contingent of rookies, which amounted for half of the starters (17 out of 33) at the Indianapolis 500, while leading detractors and most of the media to describe the event as a 'watered-down' affair.

On August 28, 1995, it was announced that the inaugural 1996 season would end at the Indianapolis 500, the plan being to spread subsequent seasons over two calendar years and award the IRL championships at the conclusion of every Indy 500. As a result, the announced races at New Hampshire and Las Vegas would in fact open the 1996–97 season in late summer. This scheduling format went against the traditional motorsports grain, and the idea was eventually scrapped in October 1996, with the 1996–97 season being expanded in order to bring the schedule back in sync with the rest of the motorsports world for 1998.

The IRL points system was to be staggered to adjust for the number of races each driver entered. The number of points awarded per race would be multiplied by the number of events the driver had participated in. If a driver entered all three events, the points awarded for that third race were multiplied by three. Despite the short season, only fifteen drivers competed in all three events, but all of them had a decent number of entrants due to the pool of older chassis made available by some of the teams with previous Indy 500 experience, as well as spare machinery being acquired from some CART teams. Ford Cosworth supplied most of the field with its V8 engines, with the rest relying on stock-block V6 units, either Buick or Menard-branded.

== Confirmed entries ==
Team	Chassis	Engine	Tires	No.	Driver(s)	Rounds
(United States) ABF Motorsports	Lola T92/00	Buick	G	96	(United States) Paul Durant	2–3
(United States) A. J. Foyt Enterprises	Lola T95/00	Ford-Cosworth	G	11	(United States) Scott Sharp (Note: 1. 41 at Walt Disney World.)	All
(United States) A. J. Foyt Enterprises	Lola T95/00	Ford-Cosworth	G	14	(United States) Davey Hamilton	All
(United States) A. J. Foyt Enterprises	Lola T95/00	Ford-Cosworth	G	41	(United States) Mike Groff (Note: 1. 11 at Walt Disney World.)	1–2
(United States) A. J. Foyt Enterprises	Lola T94/00	Ford-Cosworth	G	41	(Brazil) Marco Greco	3
(United States) Beck Motorsports/Zunne Group (Note: At Walt Disney World.) (United States) Beck Motorsports	Lola T94/00; Reynard 94I (Note: Used at Walt Disney World.)	Ford-Cosworth	F	52	(Japan) Hideshi Matsuda	3
(United States) Beck Motorsports/Zunne Group (United States) Beck Motorsports	Lola T94/00; Reynard 94I	Ford-Cosworth	F	54	(United States) Robbie Buhl	1, 3
(United States) Blueprint Racing	Lola T93/00	Menard	F	16	(United States) Johnny Parsons	All
(United States) Blueprint Racing	Lola T93/00	Menard	F	27	(United States) Jim Guthrie	2–3
(United States) Blueprint Racing	Lola T92/00	Buick	F	36	(United States) Dan Drinan (Note: Tyce Carlson and Andy Michner passed their Indianapolis rookie test in the car.)	2
(United States) Loop Hole Racing	Lola T91/00	Buick	G	36	(United States) Dan Drinan	3
(United States) Bradley Motorsports	Reynard 95I	Ford-Cosworth	F	12	(United States) Buzz Calkins	All
(United States) Brickell Racing	Lola T93/00	Menard	G	77	(United States) Danny Ongais	3
(United States) Brickell Racing	Lola T93/00	Menard	G	77	(United States) Tyce Carlson (Note: At the Indy 500, Scott Brayton withdrew his already qualified #2 car and won the pole in the backup #32, but was fatally injured in a practice crash and replaced by Danny Ongais, who switched from Brickell Racing. Ongais was replaced by Tyce Carlson.)	3
(United States) Byrd/Leberle–Treadway Racing (United States) Byrd–Treadway Racing	Reynard 95I; Reynard 94I (Note: Used at the Indianapolis 500.)	Ford-Cosworth	F G	5	(Netherlands) Arie Luyendyk	All
(United States) Cunningham Racing	Reynard 95I; Lola T94/00	Ford-Cosworth	F	75	(United States) Johnny O'Connell	All
(United States) Della Penna Motorsports	Reynard 95I	Ford-Cosworth	G	4	(United States) Richie Hearn	All
(United States) Della Penna Motorsports	Reynard 95I	Ford-Cosworth	G	44	(United States) Scott Harrington (Note: Switched from Harrington Motorsport during practice for the Indy 500.)	3
(United States) DeLorto Motorsports	Lola T92/00	Buick	G	81	(United States) Rick DeLorto	1
(United States) Galles Racing	Lola T95/00	Mercedes-Ilmor	G	70	(United States) Davy Jones	3
(United States) Hemelgarn Racing	Reynard 95I; Reynard 94I (Note: Used by Brad Murphey.)	Ford-Cosworth	F	9	(France) Stéphan Grégoire	All
(United States) Hemelgarn Racing	Reynard 95I; Reynard 94I	Ford-Cosworth	F	10	(United States) Brad Murphey	3
(United States) Hemelgarn Racing	Reynard 95I; Reynard 94I	Ford-Cosworth	F	91	(United States) Buddy Lazier	All
(United States) Leigh Miller Racing	Lola T94/00	Ford-Cosworth	F	17	(United States) Stan Wattles	1–2
(United States) Pagan Racing	Reynard 94I; Reynard 95I (Note: Used by Roberto Guerrero at the Indy 500.)	Ford-Cosworth	G	21	(Colombia) Roberto Guerrero	All
(United States) Pagan Racing	Reynard 94I; Reynard 95I	Ford-Cosworth	G	99	(United States) Billy Boat	3
(United States) PDM/Automatic Sprinkler System (United States) PDM Racing	Lola T93/00	Menard	G	18	(United States) John Paul Jr.	All
(United States) Project Indy	Lola T93/00	Ford-Cosworth	G	46	(New Zealand) Rob Wilson	3
(United States) Project Indy	Reynard 94I; Reynard 95I (Note: Used at Phoenix.)	Ford-Cosworth	G	64	(United States) Johnny Unser	2–3
(United States) Scandia/Simon Racing (United States) Team Scandia	Lola T95/00; Lola T94/00 (Note: Used by Joe Gosek and Racin Gardner.); Lola T93/00 (Note: Used by Lyn St. James at Walt Disney World.); Reynard 95I (Note: Used by Michele Alboreto at the Indy 500 and Lyn St. James at Phoenix.)	Ford-Cosworth	G	7	(Chile) Eliseo Salazar	1, 3
(United States) Scandia/Simon Racing (United States) Team Scandia	Lola T95/00; Lola T94/00; Lola T93/00; Reynard 95I	Ford-Cosworth	G	7	(Spain) Fermín Vélez	2
(United States) Scandia/Simon Racing (United States) Team Scandia	Lola T95/00; Lola T94/00; Lola T93/00; Reynard 95I	Ford-Cosworth	G	8	(Italy) Alessandro Zampedri	3
(United States) Scandia/Simon Racing (United States) Team Scandia	Lola T95/00; Lola T94/00; Lola T93/00; Reynard 95I	Ford-Cosworth	G	22	(Mexico) Michel Jourdain Jr.	2–3
(United States) Scandia/Simon Racing (United States) Team Scandia	Lola T95/00; Lola T94/00; Lola T93/00; Reynard 95I	Ford-Cosworth	G	33	(Italy) Michele Alboreto	All
(United States) Scandia/Simon Racing (United States) Team Scandia	Lola T95/00; Lola T94/00; Lola T93/00; Reynard 95I	Ford-Cosworth	G	34	(Spain) Fermín Vélez	3
(United States) Scandia/Simon Racing (United States) Team Scandia	Lola T95/00; Lola T94/00; Lola T93/00; Reynard 95I	Ford-Cosworth	G	43	(United States) Joe Gosek (Note: Joe Gosek, first entered in the #25, switched to the #15 and replaced Justin Bell, before switching to Team Scandia during practice for the Indy 500.)	3
(United States) Scandia/Simon Racing (United States) Team Scandia	Lola T95/00; Lola T94/00; Lola T93/00; Reynard 95I	Ford-Cosworth	G	90	(United States) Lyn St. James	1–2
(United States) Scandia/Simon Racing (United States) Team Scandia	Lola T95/00; Lola T94/00; Lola T93/00; Reynard 95I	Ford-Cosworth	G	90	(United States) Racin Gardner	3
(United States) Team Menard	Lola T95/00	Menard	F G	2	(United States) Scott Brayton	1–3
(United States) Team Menard	Lola T95/00	Menard	F G	3	(United States) Eddie Cheever	All
(United States) Team Menard	Lola T95/00	Menard	F G	20	(United States) Tony Stewart	All
(United States) Team Menard	Lola T95/00	Menard	F G	30	(United States) Mark Dismore	3
(United States) Team Menard	Lola T95/00	Menard	F G	32	(United States) Danny Ongais	3
(United States) Tempero–Giuffre Racing	Lola T92/00; Lola T93/00 (Note: Used by David Kudrave.)	Buick	G	15	(United States) Bill Tempero	1
(United States) Tempero–Giuffre Racing	Lola T92/00; Lola T93/00	Buick	G	15	(United States) David Kudrave	2
(United States) Tempero–Giuffre Racing	Lola T92/00; Lola T93/00	Buick	G	15	(United Kingdom) Justin Bell	3
(United States) Tempero–Giuffre Racing	Lola T92/00; Lola T93/00	Buick	G	15	(United States) Joe Gosek	3
(United States) Tempero–Giuffre Racing	Lola T92/00; Lola T93/00	Buick	G	25	(United States) David Kudrave	1
(United States) Tempero–Giuffre Racing	Lola T92/00; Lola T93/00	Buick	G	25	(United States) Racin Gardner	2
(United States) Tempero–Giuffre Racing	Lola T92/00; Lola T93/00	Buick	G	25	(United States) Billy Roe	2
(United States) Walker Racing	Reynard 95I	Ford-Cosworth	G	60	(United States) Mike Groff	3
(United States) Zunne Group Racing	Lola T93/00	Buick	F	24	(United States) Randy Tolsma	3
(United States) Zunne Group Racing	Lola T94/00	Ford-Cosworth	F	45	(United States) Robbie Buhl	2
(United States) Zunne Group Racing	Lola T94/00	Ford-Cosworth	G	45	(United States) Lyn St. James	3

=== Team announcements/changes ===
- A. J. Foyt Enterprises became the only Indy Car full-time team to join the Indy Racing League ranks for its 1996 inaugural season. The team would fill more than one car at every race for the first time since Roger McCluskey joined Foyt as teammate in the 1969 USAC Champ Car season.
- Indianapolis business man Fred Treadway formed an alliance with Andreas Leberle, owner of the Project Indy team that had run 15 Indy Car races in two years, and Jonathan Byrd, who had lent support to a number of teams in the Indy 500 since 1985. The one-car team, initially known as Byrd/Leberle–Treadway Racing, acquired a Reynard 95I from Walker Racing, and a 94I that had been used by Team Green as a back-up car for Jacques Villeneuve, which would eventually become the pole-sitting, record-breaking car at Indianapolis.
- Four teams that had competed in Indy Car in a part-time basis, mainly at the Indianapolis 500, also entered the competition:
  - Team Menard, who had been running an Indy 500 one-off program with stock-block engines for a decade, planned to compete in the Indy Racing League with a two-car program. Since 1985, their only Indy Car race outside Indianapolis was the 1990 Autoworks 200 at Phoenix International Raceway, with Jim Crawford. The team bought two brand-new Lola T95 to complement their effort.
  - Hemelgarn Racing also entered the Indy Racing League, competing outside Indianapolis for the first time since 1990. The team only employed Ford Cosworth powerplants, phasing out entirely the use of Buick engines after 10 years, and purchased two Reynard chassis from Chip Ganassi Racing.
  - Pagan Racing, a team that had run a 3-race program in Indy Car in 1995, entered the series. The team bought a Reynard 95I chassis from Forsythe Racing, and switched to Ford Cosworth powerplants, as Mercedes declined to lease their Ilmor powerplants outside of the Indy 500.
  - Beck Motorsports, a team that had debuted at the 1995 Indianapolis 500 after four years running entries for other teams, partnered with The Zunne Group, a company that tried to promote San Antonio as a racing hub, to compete in the IRL season.
- Two teams joined the IRL from junior series: Bradley Motorsports, a family-run Indy Lights team created by the owner of Bradley Petroleum, and Della Penna Motorsports, winners of the 1995 Atlantic Championship, who also contested a partial Indy Car schedule. Both teams acquired Reynard 95I machinery; Della Penna from Arciero/Wells and Forsythe, while Bradley bought Christian Fittipaldi's 2nd place machine at the previous year's Indy 500 from Walker.
- Team Scandia was an IMSA GT outfit led by driver Andy Evans, who entered the IRL in a partnership with Indy Car team Dick Simon Racing, on which both sides would provide a full-time car each. This union was dissolved in January when Evans took full control of the team, although Simon remained as team manager. The team competed as Scandia/Simon Racing in the first race, before switching to its original name.
- Two further teams also came from IMSA GT competition: Cunningham Racing, a team that also had experience at Le Mans, and Leigh Miller Racing, a relatively novel team with two years of experience. Cunningham was one of the few teams to make use of a brand-new 1995 car during the season.
- Blueprint Aircraft Engines, an independent engine builder owned by former drag racer Ed Rachanski, entered the series as Team Blueprint, being later renamed to Blueprint Racing.
- Three weeks before the inaugural IRL race, long-time chief mechanics Paul Diatlovich and Chuck Buckman led the formation of a new race team, which would be known as PDM Racing. The team had bought the assets of the defunct Leader Card team, on which Diatlovich had been the Team Manager for its last three years.
- With the support of Frank and Dominic Giuffre, owners of a crane company and past Indy-backers, veteran driver Bill Tempero was able to set-up his own team, Tempero–Giuffre Racing. Out of all the driver-owner teams coming from the American Indycar Series, Tempero–Giuffre was the only one able to start an IRL race.
- On February, Beck Motorsports and Zunne Group ended their partnership. As Zunne Group was the legal owner of the cars employed by Beck, the team retained them to compete on their own, partnering with McCormack Motorsports to run the operation, and Beck had to sat out the Phoenix race while looking for new machinery.
- On February 13, Andreas Leberle stepped out of his partnership with Jonathan Byrd and Fred Treadway, as he desired to compete in selected events in the Indy Car World Series, while Treadway and Byrd wanted to concentrate exclusively on the IRL. From then on, the team was known as Byrd–Treadway Racing, while Project Indy competed independently in the IRL.
- On February 26, ABF Motorsports was registered as a new team under the leadership of Canadian owner Art Boulianne, a former super-modified driver.
- At some point between the Phoenix and Indianapolis races, Leigh Miller Racing's assets were bought by Beck Motorsports in order to compete at the Indy 500.
- On April, Galles Racing and Walker Racing, two teams competing in Indy Car, entered the Indianapolis 500 because of sponsorship commitments. Walker's main sponsor, Valvoline, was also a sponsor of the race telecast on ABC, while Delco Electronics, primary sponsor for Galles, was based in Indiana. Galles would have the only Mercedes-Ilmor engine in the field.
- After supporting Dan Drinan's entry at Phoenix, Loop Hole Racing entered the IRL for an Indy 500-only effort. The team owned by David & Bud Hoffpauir had previously competed in the Pikes Peak Hill Climb and the American Indycar Series with the same machine they entered for the race, a formerly Alfa Romeo-powered Lola T91 bought from the defunct Leader Card team in 1994.

=== Driver announcements/changes ===
- On September 21, 1995, Team Menard became the first team to announce a driver for the IRL, selecting Eddie Cheever for one of their cars. Cheever had been out of a drive since losing his full-time seat with A. J. Foyt Racing a month prior.
- On October 3, 1995, Scandia/Simon Racing announced that Eliseo Salazar would continue with the team as their driver for their 1996 program. Salazar remained at the wheel of the No. 7 Simon car, on which he had finished 21st in his debut Indy Car season. Salazar and Cheever were the lone competitors coming from full-time Indy Car status in 1995.
- On November 9, 1995, Byrd/Leberle–Treadway Racing announced that 1990 Indianapolis 500 winner Arie Luyendyk would drive the No. 5 entry. Luyendyk was the most popular driver in the IRL roster, although he had only run a couple of oval races in 1995.
- On November 28, 1995, after the opening day of testing at Walt Disney World Speedway, A. J. Foyt Enterprises announced Davey Hamilton as the driver of the No. 14 car. A multiple supermodified champion in the Northwest, Hamilton had failed to qualify for that year's Indianapolis 500, after two scratched entries in years past.
- On November 29, 1995, Team Menard filled their two-car lineup with the announcement of Scott Brayton, who would drive the No. 2 car. Brayton was the reigning Indianapolis 500 pole-sitter, and would be the most-experienced Indy Car driver in the field at 148 starts.
- On December 2, 1995, Della Penna Motorsports announced their plans to field the No. 4 for 25-year old Richie Hearn, who had won the 1995 Atlantic Championship with the team. Hearn would also compete in selected Indy Car World Series races with the same team.
- Testing continued at Walt Disney World Speedway from November 28 to December 8, 1995, with prospective and yet-to-be-announced drivers, leading to a tentative entry list with 18 drivers:
  - Hemelgarn Racing announced that Stéphan Grégoire would drive the No. 9 entry. Grégoire's only Indy car experience was a 19th-place finish at the 1993 Indianapolis 500, having failed to qualify for the 1994 event before driving in a single IMSA GT event in late 1995.
  - Pagan Racing announced that Roberto Guerrero, the 2-time pole-sitter at the Indianapolis 500, would drive the No. 21 entry, the same he had driven at Indianapolis in 1994 and 1995 after losing his full-time status.
  - Bradley Motorsports fielded the No. 12 entry for Buzz Calkins, who had finished 6th in Indy Lights. The team had been formed around him by his father, in order to aid his racing career.
  - Team Scandia, on their side of the Scandia/Simon partnership, arranged the signing of veteran driver Michele Alboreto in the No. 33 for a dual IRL/IMSA program. A former Ferrari driver with 15 seasons of Formula One experience, Alboreto had last driven in the DTM for Alfa Romeo. The Lola T95 he drove at Indianapolis had been sold by Team Green and Jacques Villeneuve, according to IMS Radio.
  - Leigh Miller Racing entered the No. 17 for Stan Wattles, a road-racer in SCCA and IMSA who had finished 12th in the 1995 Atlantic Championship. He would also contest the series in 1996 along his IRL programme.
  - Cunningham Racing filed the No. 75 entry for Johnny O'Connell, who had raced for the team since 1991. O'Connell, who won the Formula Atlantic Pacific division in 1987, had since become a consummate GT driver, scoring a class win in the Le Mans 24 hour race and finishing 5th in the IMSA GTS-1 class in 1995.
  - Blueprint Racing submitted the No. 16 entry for 51-year old Johnny Parsons, who had made the last of his 11 Indianapolis 500 starts in 1986. Since then, Parsons had failed to qualify for the race seven times, with only one further Indy Car start in 1991. He had remained active in the USAC scene, finishing 6th in the Midget series and 9th in the Silver Crown series in 1995.
  - As owner of Tempero/Giuffre Racing, 52-year old Bill Tempero entered himself to drive the No. 15 car. Tempero ran 25 Indy Car races in the early 1980s with his own team, but he had not run an Indy car race in 13 years. He was the founder and reigning champion of the American Indycar Series, which he had won a record 4 times, and used the same machinery he raced in that series.
  - Butch Brickell entered the series as a driver-owner of Brickell Racing with the No. 77 entry, despite only having very minor road racing experience. Brickell had been more proficient in off-road racing and offshore powerboat racing, and he worked full-time as a Hollywood stuntman. He broke two vertebrae in a January 13 testing crash, and never raced in the series.
  - Jim Buick, a commercial airline pilot who used to double up as a racing driver in a variety of amateur series, entered the race at Walt Disney World Speedway with his own Buick Racing team, from the American Indycar Series. Buick, who was 55-year old, had run four oval CART races in 1981. Despite being present at Orlando, he never took to the track.
  - Rick DeLorto was another driver with American Indycar Series, midget and amateur racing experience that entered the Orlando event as a driver-owner. DeLorto, a 46-year old, had unsuccessfully tried to qualify for two CART races in 1982. He would fail his rookie tests at Orlando practice and Phoenix testing for being too slow.
  - Tony Turco, also of American Indycar Series background, entered the Orlando race with his own team, but he withdrew two weeks before the race, as he had no sponsor to field his car.
- On January 8, PDM Racing, operating under a provisional name at the time, announced John Paul Jr. as the driver of the No. 18. Paul Jr. was the 1983 Michigan 500 winner, and had been mainly an Indy 500 one-off driver during the decade, years after serving time for drug-related charges. He also remained in IMSA GT competition, where he had been a regular competitor during 1995.
- On January 10, Team Scandia announced that Lyn St. James would drive the No. 90 entry during the 1996 season. St. James had 11 Indy Car starts since 1992, four of them at the Indianapolis 500, where she qualified 6th in 1994.
- On January 12, Hemelgarn Racing announced that Buddy Lazier would drive the No. 91 entry for the season. Lazier had been a perennial backmarker in Indy Car since his debut in 1990, with only 3 top-10 finishes in 55 starts.
- On January 12, Beck Motorsports announced that Robbie Buhl would drive the No. 54 entry. Buhl, the 1992 champion and 1995 runner-up in Indy Lights competition, had contested 12 Indy Car rounds between 1993 and 1994. After Beck and The Zunne Group split, Buhl was allowed to run with Zunne at Phoenix in the No. 45 car, before returning to Beck Motorsports at Indianapolis.
- On January 15, A. J. Foyt Enterprises announced that Scott Sharp would drive the No. 41 entry (later the No. 11). Sharp was a former SCCA champion who participated in the 1995 Indianapolis 500 with the team, after racing the full 1994 Indy Car season with 2 top-10 finishes.
- On January 19, Team Menard announced that dirt-track phenom Tony Stewart would drive the No. 20 entry for the season. Stewart was the first driver to achieve the USAC Triple Crown by winning all three series, and combined the IRL season with a partial schedule in the NASCAR Busch Series.
- On January 24, Tempero/Giuffre Racing announced that David Kudrave would drive a second car for the team. Kudrave raced seven times in the 1993 Indy Car season, scoring points at Phoenix and the Michigan 500. After running the No. 25 entry at Orlando, Kudrave ran the No. 15 car at Phoenix, and was scheduled to do so at Indianapolis.
- On January 25, A. J. Foyt Enterprises announced that Mike Groff would drive the No. 41 car, just before the start of practice at Walt Disney World Speedway, and up to the Indianapolis 500. Groff had 53 IndyCar starts since 1990 with 11 top-10 finishes under his belt, but he hadn't raced since losing his full-time ride at Rahal-Hogan Racing at the end of 1994.
- On February 19, Blueprint Racing announced that Jim Guthrie would drive the No. 27 entry from Phoenix onwards. Guthrie had finished 11th in the Atlantic Championship standings the previous year.
- On February 26, Team Scandia announced that Michel Jourdain Jr. would drive the No. 22 car at Phoenix and Indianapolis, along a part-time program in the Indy Car World Series, becoming one of the youngest Indy car drivers ever at 19 years old. Jourdain Jr. was the son of former Indy Car driver Bernard Jourdain, and had finished third in the Mexican Formula 2 series.
- On March 8, Team Scandia announced the reigning IMSA GT champion Fermín Vélez as the driver the No. 7 entry at Phoenix, replacing Eliseo Salazar, who had been injured at Walt Disney World Speedway. Vélez would later be entered as an additional entry for the Indianapolis 500, initially in the No. 43 car. He last raced in an open-wheel car in the 1988 Formula 3000 season.
- On March 8, Blueprint Racing confirmed that Dan Drinan would drive the No. 36 entry at Phoenix. His entry, as well as Guthrie's, was co-owned by Loop Hole Racing's owners, who would later enter Drinan for the Indianapolis 500 on their own. A former mechanic in CART in the 80's, Drinan had run the USAC Silver Crown series in 1995, having been a midget racer the previous years.
- On March 15, ABF Motorsports announced 36-year old Paul Durant as the driver of the No. 96 entry. Durant was a three-time SMRA champion in supermodifieds, and had raced in the USAC Silver Crown series.
- On March 22, Project Indy announced that Johnny Unser would drive the No. 64 entry at Phoenix and Indianapolis. Unser had run five Indy Car races in 1993 and 1994, and finished 2nd in the GT2 class of the 1995 24 Hours of Le Mans.
- On March 22, Tempero/Giuffre Racing entered Racin Gardner in the No. 25 entry, vacant after Bill Tempero failed to pass his rookie test at Orlando. Gardner had raced in the American Indycar Series, and had been a test driver for Project Indy in 1995. However, he couldn't pass his rookie test because of engine failures, and he was replaced the next day by Billy Roe, a former racing mechanic that had sporadically driven in Super Vee, Indy Lights and Formula Atlantic.
- On April 7, Walker Racing announced that Mike Groff would drive the No. 60 entry at Indianapolis, with Groff switching from A. J. Foyt Enterprises.
- On April 7, Galles Racing announced that their test driver Davy Jones, a noted sports car driver with 11 Indy car races behind the wheel, would drive the No. 70 entry at Indianapolis.
- As the entry list for the Indianapolis 500 was unveiled on April 15, a number of deals were made public:
  - Team Menard fielded Mark Dismore in the No. 30 entry. With four Indy Car starts, he had failed to qualify for the Indy 500 in 1991, suffering multiple injuries in a crash, and in his 1992 comeback, having run sporadically in the Atlantic Championship since then. Dismore had also won the 1993 24 Hours of Daytona for Dan Gurney's All American Racers.
  - Hemelgarn Racing fielded Brad Murphey in the No. 10 entry. Murphey had failed to qualify twice for a CART race in 1984, and hadn't raced since suffering a concussion in an SCCA Corvette Challenge crash in 1988, also his third year of American Racing Series -Indy Lights- competition.
  - Beck Motorsports fielded Hideshi Matsuda in the No. 52 entry. At the time, Matsuda was driving for Porsche in the All Japan GT Championship, and had run twice in the Indy 500, finishing 15th in 1995.
  - McCormack Motorsports fielded Randy Tolsma in the No. 24 car, although his entry would be later integrated under the Zunne Group Racing banner. Tolsma had been since 1993 a regular in the USAC Midget and Silver Crown circuits, finishing 3rd in the latter in 1994.
  - Scott Harrington entered the race as a driver-owner of the No. 39 entry, in an effort run by Larry Nash's LP Racing. The former motocross racer had one Indy Car start at Road America in 1989, and had last competed at the SCCA Can-Am series in 1994. His Lola T92 was the same machine A. J. Foyt drove to a 9th-place finish in his last Indy 500 start in 1992.
- At the start of practice, three additional drivers had signed to drive in the Indy 500.
  - A. J. Foyt Enterprises entered Brazilian driver Marco Greco in the vacant No. 41 car. Greco had been a regular of Indy Car's lower ranks for the past three years, with no top-10 finishes to his credit.
  - Team Scandia signed Racin Gardner as a replacement to Lyn St. James, who had been unable to find enough sponsorship to keep her seat.
  - Tempero-Giuffre Racing entered Joe Gosek to drive the No. 25 entry. 'Double-O Joe' had a cult following at grassroots level, being a Super-modified champion and a two-times track champion at the Oswego Speedway.
- On May 5, the first day of practice, Tempero-Giuffre Racing put Justin Bell in the No. 15 entry, replacing David Kudrave. Bell was a GT driver for multiple General Motors' brands, and had previously competed in the American Racing Series, precursor of Indy Lights. On May 16, he stepped out of the ride, as his chassis kept struggling for speed.
- On May 6, Team Scandia announced a deal with Alessandro Zampedri to drive the No. 8 entry. Zampedri had run in Indy Car for two years, collecting five top-10 finishes in 28 starts.
- On May 7, Zunne Group Racing announced that Lyn St. James would drive the No. 45 entry at Indianapolis. Unlike Robbie Buhl in the previous race and Randy Tolsma, she competed with Goodyear tires.
- On May 14, Pagan Racing announced that Billy Boat would attempt to qualify for the Indianapolis 500 in the team's back-up car, the No. 99 entry. Boat was the reigning USAC Western Midget Series champion, and had won the prestigious Turkey Night Grand Prix. On Bump Day, Boat sampled the No. 84 entry for A. J. Foyt Enterprises to prevent a possible bumping, but he crashed before being bumped from the grid.
- On May 16, Brickell Racing announced that Danny Ongais would drive the No. 77 entry at Indianapolis, as Butch Brickell had not been medically cleared to race. Ongais, who turned 54 on May 21, was the winningest driver in the field with 6 Indy car wins, but he hadn't raced since the 1987 Nissan Indy Challenge at the Tamiami Park street circuit.
- On May 16, Project Indy announced that Rob Wilson would drive the No. 46 entry at Indianapolis. Wilson, who had raced in Europe since the mid-1970s, was the 1990 Barber Saab Pro Series champion, and had finished 12th in the 1994 Indy Lights season.
- On May 17, Scott Brayton was killed in a crash during practice for the Indianapolis 500 after suffering a basilar skull fracture. Two days later, Team Menard announced Danny Ongais as Brayton's replacement for the race. Brickell Racing replaced Ongais with Tyce Carlson, a dirt-track racer who had run in the three USAC national series the previous year.
- On May 19, Team Scandia fielded their seventh Indy 500 entry for Joe Gosek, who had left Tempero/Giuffre Racing after passing his rookie test two days before. He drove the No. 43 entry, as Fermín Vélez was moved to the No. 34 car.
- On May 19, Scott Harrington signed a last-minute deal to switch to the No. 44 back-up car for Della Penna Motorsports, after damaging his chassis in a practice crash on May 16.

== Schedule ==
All races were run on Oval/Speedway. ABC Sports televised all three races. IMS Radio Network was the broadcaster for all races on the radio.

Rd	Date	Race Name	Track	Location
1	January 27	Indy 200 at Walt Disney World	Walt Disney World Speedway	Bay Lake, Florida
2	March 24	Dura Lube 200	Phoenix International Raceway	Phoenix, Arizona
3	May 26	80th Indianapolis 500	Indianapolis Motor Speedway	Speedway, Indiana

== Results ==
Rd	Race	Pole position	Fastest lap	Most laps led	Race Winner				Report
Rd	Race	Pole position	Fastest lap	Most laps led	Driver	Team	Chassis	Engine	Report
1	Walt Disney World	(United States) Buddy Lazier	(United States) Buzz Calkins	(United States) Buzz Calkins	(United States) Buzz Calkins	Bradley Motorsports	Reynard	Ford-Cosworth	Report
2	Phoenix	(Netherlands) Arie Luyendyk	(Netherlands) Arie Luyendyk	(Netherlands) Arie Luyendyk	(Netherlands) Arie Luyendyk	Byrd-Treadway Racing	Reynard	Ford-Cosworth	Report
3	Indianapolis	(United States) Tony Stewart^{A}	(United States) Eddie Cheever	(Colombia) Roberto Guerrero	(United States) Buddy Lazier	Hemelgarn Racing	Reynard	Ford-Cosworth	Report

^A Scott Brayton was the fastest qualifier for the 1996 Indianapolis 500, but was killed during practice. Hence, second-fastest qualifier Tony Stewart started from the pole.

== Points standings ==
Pos	Driver	WDW	PHX	INDY	Pts
1	(United States) Buzz Calkins	1*	6	17	246
1	(United States) Scott Sharp	11	2	10	246
3	(United States) Robbie Buhl	3	13	9	240
4	(United States) Richie Hearn	19	4	3	237
4	(Colombia) Roberto Guerrero	5	16	5*	237
6	(United States) Mike Groff	6	3	20	228
7	(Netherlands) Arie Luyendyk	14	**1***	16	225
8	(United States) Tony Stewart	2	11	24	204
9	(United States) Johnny O'Connell	7	5	29	192
9	(United States) Davey Hamilton	12	17	12	192
11	(Italy) Michele Alboreto	4	8	30	189
12	(United States) Lyn St. James	8	21	14	186
13	(France) Stéphan Grégoire	16	7	27	165
14	(United States) Buddy Lazier	**17**	Wth	1	159
15	(United States) John Paul Jr.	9	14	31	153
16	(United States) Eddie Cheever	10	Wth	11	147
17	(United States) Johnny Parsons	18	12	28	141
18	(United States) Scott Brayton	15	18	**Wth**^{†}	111
19	(United States) David Kudrave	20	10		80
20	(Mexico) Michel Jourdain Jr.		20	13	74
20	(United States) Jim Guthrie		15	18	74
22	(Spain) Fermín Vélez		19	21	60
23	(Chile) Eliseo Salazar	Wth		6	58
24	(United States) Johnny Unser		9	33	56
25	(United States) Stan Wattles	13	Wth		44
26	(United States) Davy Jones			2	33
27	(United States) Paul Durant		22	32	32
28	(Italy) Alessandro Zampedri			4	31
29	(United States) Danny Ongais			7	28
30	(Japan) Hideshi Matsuda			8	27
31	(United States) Scott Harrington			15	20
32	(United States) Mark Dismore			19	16
33	(United States) Joe Gosek			22	13
34	(United States) Brad Murphey			23	12
35	(United States) Racin Gardner		Wth	25	10
36	(Brazil) Marco Greco			26	9
—	(United States) Dan Drinan		Wth	DNQ	0
—	(United States) Billy Boat			DNQ	0
—	(United States) Tyce Carlson			DNQ	0
—	(United States) Randy Tolsma			DNQ	0
—	(New Zealand) Rob Wilson			DNQ	0
—	(United States) Rick DeLorto	Wth			0
—	(United States) Bill Tempero	Wth			0
—	(United States) Billy Roe		Wth		0
—	(United Kingdom) Justin Bell			Wth	0
Pos	Driver	WDW	PHX	INDY	Pts

Color	Result
Gold	Winner
Silver	2nd place
Bronze	3rd place
Green	4th & 5th place
Light Blue	6th–10th place
Dark Blue	Finished (Outside Top 10)
Purple	Did not finish (Ret)
Red	Did not qualify (DNQ)
Brown	Withdrawn (Wth)
Black	Disqualified (DSQ)
White	Did not start (DNS)
Blank	Did not participate (DNP)
Blank	Not competing

**In-line notation**
**Bold**	Pole position
Italics	Ran fastest race lap
*	Led most race laps
^{†}	Fatal accident
Pts	The number of points awarded per race would be multiplied by the number of events the driver had participated in.

Note: ^{†} Scott Brayton, 37, won the pole for the 1996 Indianapolis 500, but was killed in a crash during practice after qualifying.

== See also ==
- 1996 Indianapolis 500
- 1996 Indy Lights season
- 1996 IndyCar season
- 1996 Toyota Atlantic Championship season

== Bibliography ==
- Indy Review, Volume 6: 1996 Indy Racing League / 80th Indianapolis 500. Osceola, WI: Indy 500 Publications / Indianapolis Motor Speedway Corporation. 1996. ISBN 978-1-880526-05-7.
