= Racin Gardner =

American racing driver

- Nationality: (United States) American
- Born: Slick Racin Gardner; 25 February 1972 (age 54) Buellton, California, United States

Slick Racin Gardner (born February 25, 1972, in Buellton, California) is a former professional racing driver who most notably raced in the 1996 Indianapolis 500 for Simon/Team Scandia.

Previously, Gardner tested the Green Monster land speed car at Bonneville for four years, becoming the youngest driver ever to top 500 mph in 1988 at the age of sixteen. He drove off-road vehicles in the High Desert Racing Association from 1991 to 1993, and was eighth in points and the rookie of the year in the American Indycar Series in 1993. After a second year in the series, he tested for the Project Indy team, which was competing in the IndyCar World Series.

Gardner intended to debut in the new Indy Racing League in 1996 at Phoenix. Despite failing to pass his rookie test in the "Test at the West" because of an engine failure, Gardner was entered at the last minute with Tempero/Giuffre Racing. However, further mechanical issues in practice left him unable to pass his test and compete. At the Indianapolis 500, Gardner competed for Team Scandia, qualifying 25th on the second day of qualifiers. He retired after 76 laps with a suspension failure, being credited with a 25th place finish.

After Indy, Gardner would compete in one ARCA Racing Series race, at Charlotte Motor Speedway, finishing eighteenth. After retiring from racing, he became a stunt driver for television and motion pictures.

== Racing record ==
=== Complete IndyCar Series results ===
Year	Team	Chassis	No.	Engine	1	2	3	Rank	Points	Ref
1996	Tempero–Giuffre Racing	Lola T92	25	Buick	WDW	PHX; Wth		35th	10	
1996	Team Scandia	Lola T94	90	Ford			INDY; 25	35th	10	

=== Indy 500 results ===
Year	Chassis	Engine	Start	Finish	Team	Ref
1996	Lola	Ford-Cosworth	25th	25th	Scandia	
