= Mike Groff =

American racing driver (born 1961)

- Nationality: American
- Born: Michael Dennis Groff; November 16, 1961 (age 64) Van Nuys, California, U.S.
- Retired: 1999
- Relatives: Robbie Groff

Indy Racing League
- Years active: 1996-1998
- Teams: A. J. Foyt Enterprises; Walker Racing; Byrd-Cunningham Racing
- Starts: 12
- Wins: 0
- Poles: 0
- Best finish: 6th in 1996

Mike Groff

CART Championship Car
- Years active: 1990-1994, 1996
- Teams: Euromotorsport; A. J. Foyt Enterprises; Walker Racing; Rahal-Hogan Racing
- Starts: 54
- Wins: 0
- Poles: 0
- Best finish: 16th in 1991

Previous series
- 1986-1989 1985: American Racing Series; American Formula Super Vee

Championship titles
- 1989: American Racing Series champion

Michael Dennis Groff (born November 16, 1961, in Van Nuys, California) is a former race car driver who competed in CART and the IRL IndyCar Series and was the 1989 Indy Lights champion. His younger brother Robbie was also a CART and IRL driver from 1994 to 1998.

== Racing career ==
=== Formula Super Vee and Indy Lights ===
Groff made his professional debut in 1984, competing in the Valvoline/Robert Bosche Formula Super Vee series. He finished third in the series in 1985 and second in 1986. In 1986, he also made his American Racing Series debut (later renamed Indy Lights). Driving for a family team, he captured wins at the Milwaukee Mile and Road America and finished third in points. In 1987, he won at Nazareth Speedway and finished fifth in points. In 1988, he only competed in three Indy Lights races for three different teams, but finished second at Nazareth. In 1989, he competed full-time for Leading Edge Racing and captured four wins on his way to the championship.

=== CART Champ Car ===
Groff attempted to make his CART Champ Car debut in the 1990 Indianapolis 500 for Euromotorsport but failed to qualify. He made his debut three weeks later at the Detroit Grand Prix with the same team and completed the season with them. In twelve starts he had a best finish of seventh at Nazareth and finished seventeenth in points.

In 1991, Groff initially returned to Euromotorsport but switched to A. J. Foyt Enterprises for the final five races of the season. his best finish was eighth (three times) and he finished sixteenth in points. He also competed in his first Indianapolis 500.

Groff entered 1992 without a full-time ride. He qualified a second car for Walker Racing in the 1992 Indianapolis 500 but when regular driver Scott Goodyear failed to qualify, he replaced Groff. Groff made six starts that season for Euromotorsport (two races), Walker (one race), and Foyt (three races) and finished 23rd in points.

In 1993, Groff joined Rahal-Hogan Racing for a limited race schedule. Groff made six starts in 1993 for Rahal-Hogan with a best finish of ninth at Portland International Raceway. He finished 23rd in points.

1994 saw Groff return to Rahal-Hogan full-time. The team had since abandoned their bespoke chassis but were the first team to experiment with Honda's new CART engine package. The team struggled with the package throughout the season and had to purchase Ilmor-powered cars from Team Penske to make the 1994 Indianapolis 500. Groff only finished twentieth in points. Rahal managed a slightly more respectable tenth.

In 1995, Groff was left without a ride. During the third day of qualifications for the 1995 Indianapolis 500, he was tabbed by Chip Ganassi Racing to drive the back-up car for Bryan Herta, who had crashed and was not cleared to drive during the weekend. As Herta risked being bumped from the field, Groff was tasked with qualifying the car if such a situation had happened. To prepare for the situation, Groff did start an official qualifying attempt, which was aborted after two laps. However, Herta was not bumped, and Groff did not drive at all during Bump Day.

=== IRL IndyCar ===
In 1996, Groff joined the new IRL IndyCar Series with Foyt Enterprises. Groff finished sixth in the series' first race and third at the second race at Phoenix International Raceway. He then was hired by Walker to race in the CART race at Nazareth where he finished fourteenth and qualified eleventh for the 1996 Indy 500 but was sidelined by a fire after 122 laps, also driving for Walker (which was one of the few teams to participate in both CART and the IRL in 1996). Groff finished sixth in the 1996 IRL championship.

For the 1996-1997 Indy Racing League season, Groff joined Byrd/Cunningham and captured three straight top-five finishes to start the season including a third at the Las Vegas Motor Speedway and a second at Walt Disney World Speedway (the first with the series new naturally aspirated cars). He finished twelfth in the 1997 Indianapolis 500 and finished fourteenth in the championship. Groff returned to Byrd-Cunningham Racing in 1998. After finishes of seventh, fifteenth, and fifteenth to start the season, he was replaced at the Texas Motor Speedway race by John Paul Jr. He was out of a ride for the rest of the season.

Groff attempted to qualify for the 1999 Indianapolis 500 for Team Xtreme Racing but failed to make the field. It would be his last IndyCar appearance.

== Racing record ==
=== American open–wheel racing results ===
(key)

==== Indy Lights ====
Year	Team	1	2	3	4	5	6	7	8	9	10	11	12	Rank	Points
1986	Groff Motorsport	PHX1; 12	MIL; 1	MEA; 12	TOR; 2	POC; 2	MDO; 13	ROA; 1	LS; 7	PHX2; 7	MIA			5th	89
1987	Patrick Racing	PHX; 4	MIL; 3	MEA; 10	CLE; 12	TOR; 2	POC; 10	MDO; 3	NAZ; 1	LS; 5	MIA; 11			3rd	96
1988	Agapiou Racing	PHX	MIL	POR	CLE	TOR	MEA; 15	POC	MDO	ROA; 5				13th	26
1988	Leading Edge Motorsport										NAZ; 2	LS	MIA	13th	26
1989	Leading Edge Motorsport	PHX; 1	LBH; 9	MIL; 1	DET; 4	POR; 5	MEA; 1	TOR; 7	POC; 13	MDO; 2	ROA; 4	NAZ; 1	LS; 2	1st	163

==== CART ====
Year	Team	Chassis	Engine	1	2	3	4	5	6	7	8	9	10	11	12	13	14	15	16	17	Rank	Points	Ref
1990	Euromotorsport	Lola T89/00	Cosworth DFS V8t	PHX	LBH	INDY; DNQ	MIL	DET; 15	POR; 23	CLE; 9	MEA; 26										17th	17	
1990	Euromotorsport	Lola T90/00	Cosworth DFS V8t									TOR; 11	MIS; 11	DEN; 14	VAN; 22	MDO; 10	ROA; 17	NAZ; 7	LS; 15		17th	17	
1991	Euromotorsport	Lola T91/00	Cosworth DFS V8t	SRF; 8	LBH; 23	PHX; 16	INDY; 24	MIL; 18	DET; 22	POR; 11	CLE; 10	MEA; 11									16th	22	
1991	A. J. Foyt Enterprises	Lola T91/00	Chevrolet 265A V8t										TOR; 8	MIS	DEN; DNS	VAN	MDO; 20	ROA; 8	NAZ	LS; 15	16th	22	
1992	Walker Racing	Lola T91/00	Chevrolet 265A V8t	SRF	PHX	LBH	INDY; Wth	DET; DNS	POR						ROA; 24	VAN					25th	5	
1992	Euromotorsport	Lola T91/00	Cosworth DFS V8t							MIL; 14	NHA; 13	TOR	MIS	CLE							25th	5	
1992	A. J. Foyt Enterprises	Lola T91/00	Chevrolet 265A V8t														MDO; 15				25th	5	
1992	A. J. Foyt Enterprises	Lola T92/00	Chevrolet 265A V8t															NAZ; 16	LS; 8		25th	5	
1993	Rahal-Hogan Racing	Rahal-Hogan RH-001	Chevrolet 265C V8t	SRF	PHX	LBH	INDY	MIL; 19	DET; 11	POR; 9	CLE	TOR	MIS	NHA; 11							23rd	8	
1993	Rahal-Hogan Racing	Lola T93/00	Chevrolet 265C V8t												ROA; 18	VAN	MDO; 22	NAZ	LS		23rd	8	
1994	Rahal-Hogan Racing	Lola T93/00	Honda HRX V8t	SRF; 8																	20th	17	
1994	Rahal-Hogan Racing	Lola T94/00	Honda HRX V8t		PHX; 6	LBH; 27		MIL; 19	DET; 27	POR; 11	CLE; 19	TOR; 22	MIS; 27	MDO; 26	NHA; 25	VAN; 14	ROA; 20	NAZ; 11	LS; 15		20th	17	
1994	Rahal-Hogan Racing	Penske PC-22	Ilmor 265C V8t				INDY; 31														20th	17	
1995	Chip Ganassi Racing	Reynard 95i	Ford XB V8t	MIA	SRF	PHX	LBH	NAZ	INDY; QL^{†}	MIL	DET	POR	ROA	TOR	CLE	MIS	MDO	NHA	VAN	LS	NC	-	
1996	Walker Racing	Reynard 96i	Ford XD V8t	MIA	RIO	SRF	LBH	NAZ; 14	500	MIL	DET	POR	CLE	TOR	MIS	MDO	ROA	VAN	LS		34th	0	
^{†} – Made an aborted qualifying attempt in Bryan Herta's back up car, as Herta was not cleared to drive after a crash and was in risk of being bumped.

==== Indy Racing League ====
Year	Team	Chassis	No.	Engine	1	2	3	4	5	6	7	8	9	10	11	Rank	Points	Ref
1996	A. J. Foyt Enterprises	Lola T95/00	11	Ford XB V8t	WDW; 6											6th	228	
1996	A. J. Foyt Enterprises	Lola T95/00	41	Ford XB V8t		PHX; 3										6th	228	
1996	Walker Racing	Reynard 95i	60	Ford XB V8t			INDY; 20									6th	228	
1996-97	Byrd-Cunningham Racing	Reynard 95i	10	Ford XB V8t	NHM; 4	LVS; 3										14th	169	
1996-97	Byrd-Cunningham Racing	G-Force GF01	10	Infiniti VRH35ADE V8			WDW; 2	PHX; 6	INDY; 12	TXS; DNS	PPI		NH2; DNS	LV2		14th	169	
1996-97	Byrd-Cunningham Racing	G-Force GF01	10	Oldsmobile Aurora V8								CLT; 14				14th	169	
1998	Byrd-Cunningham Racing	G-Force GF01B	10	Oldsmobile Aurora V8	WDW; 7	PHX; 15	INDY; 15	TXS	NHM	DOV	CLT	PPIR	ATL	TX2	LVS	30th	56	
1999	Team Xtreme	Dallara IR9	46	Infiniti VRH35ADE V8	WDW	PHX	CLT	INDY; DNQ	TXS	PPI	ATL	DOV	PP2	LVS	TX2	NC	-	

==== Indianapolis 500 ====
Year	Chassis	Engine	Start	Finish	Tean
1990	Lola T89/00	Cosworth DFS V8t	DNQ		Euromotorsport
1991	Lola T91/00	Cosworth DFS V8t	18	24	Euromotorsport
1992	Lola T91/00	Chevrolet 265A V8t	Raced by S. Goodyear		Walker Racing
1993	Rahal-Hogan RH-001	Chevrolet 265C V8t	No Attempt		Rahal-Hogan Racing
1994	Penske PC-22	Ilmor 265C V8t	31	31	Rahal-Hogan Racing
1995	Reynard 95i	Ford XB V8t	Raced by Bryan Herta		Chip Ganassi Racing
1996	Reynard 95i	Ford XB V8t	11	20	Walker Racing
1997	G-Force GF01	Infiniti VRH35ADE V8	18	12	Byrd-Cunningham Racing
1998	G-Force GF01B	Oldsmobile Aurora V8	32	15	Byrd-Cunningham Racing
1999	Dallara IR9	Infiniti VRH35ADE V8	DNQ		Team Xtreme

Sporting positions
Preceded by Jon Beekhuis	American Racing Series Champion; 1989	Succeeded by Paul Tracy
