= 1996 Dura Lube 200 =

(United States) 1996 Phoenix
Race details
- 2nd round of the 1996 Indy Racing League season
- Date: March 24, 1996
- Official name: Dura Lube 200
- Location: Phoenix International Raceway
- Course: Permanent racing facility 1.000 mi / 1.609 km
- Distance: 200 laps 200.000 mi / 321.869 km
- Weather: Dry with temperatures reaching up to 79 °F (26 °C); wind speeds reaching up to 19.8 miles per hour (31.9 km/h)

Pole position
- Driver: (Netherlands) Arie Luyendyk (Byrd/Treadway Racing)
- Time: 19.608

Fastest lap
- Driver: (Netherlands) Arie Luyendyk (Byrd/Treadway Racing)
- Time: 20.791 (on lap 11 of 200)

Podium
- First: (Netherlands) Arie Luyendyk (Byrd/Treadway Racing)
- Second: (United States) Scott Sharp (A. J. Foyt Enterprises)
- Third: (United States) Mike Groff (A. J. Foyt Enterprises)

The 1996 Dura Lube 200 was the second round of the 1996 Indy Racing League. The race was held on March 24, 1996, at the 1.000 mi (1.609 km) Phoenix International Raceway in Avondale, Arizona.

== Pre-Race News ==
After the first event at Walt Disney World Speedway, a two-month gap followed until the next race at Phoenix International Raceway, which was a trend for 1996 as the rest of the races were spread out in a similar fashion. In the meantime, some IRL competitors kept on racing: on February 4, Scott Sharp scored the overall win at the 24 Hours of Daytona in a Riley & Scott Mk III, while Johnny O'Connell and John Paul Jr. finished on the podium of the GTS-1 and GTS-2 class, respectively. Michele Alboreto also competed in the race, and would finish 2nd overall in the 12 Hours of Sebring a month later. Also, Tony Stewart started his part-time NASCAR Busch Series deal at the Daytona opener, finishing 21st in his first-ever NASCAR race, while Scott Sharp and Stan Wattles got on with their parallel Trans-Am and Atlantic programmes.

In preparation for the event, the IRL held a 3-day 'Test in the West' on February 26–28, with 20 drivers taking part at some point. Richie Hearn led the charts and set an unofficial track record at 185.854 mph. Arie Luyendyk, Tony Stewart and Roberto Guerrero also got to beat Bryan Herta's preexisting track record, which had been already beaten by Buddy Lazier in a private test. Five of the drivers that competed at Orlando (Mike Groff, Lyn St. James, Eddie Cheever, Stan Wattles and Scott Brayton) did not participate, but five other drivers joined the field to complete their driver's test: Jim Guthrie, confirmed by Blueprint Racing as their second driver before the test begun, Fermín Vélez and Michel Jourdain Jr. with Scandia/Simon Racing, Racin Gardner with Tempero/Giuffre Racing and Rick DeLorto, who looked for a second chance. Guthrie, Vélez and Jourdain Jr. passed their tests, while Gardner, hampered by an engine failure, and DeLorto, who topped at 119 mph in 27 laps, were not approved.

On early February, Project Indy, headed by Andreas Leberle, choose to split from his partnership with Jonathan Byrd and Rick Treadway, as Leberle desired to take part in selected events in the IndyCar World Series, while Treadway and Byrd preferred to concentrate on the IRL. Starting with the Phoenix test, the team was known as Byrd-Treadway Racing, switching to Firestone tires because of "performance issues", and keeping Arie Luyendyk. Project Indy stayed in the IRL, but their only IndyCar World Series outing would be at the Grand Prix of Long Beach with Dennis Vitolo. Team Menard also switched to Firestone tires from the "Test at the West" onwards.

On February 29 and March 1, USAC held a rookie orientation test, with six drivers coming mainly from midget car racing. Billy Boat, Billy Roe and Brian Gerster completed his proficiency test in PDM Racing's car, while Dan Drinan and Gary Peterson tested a car supplied by Blueprint Racing, on which Kevin Olson had an unsuccessful try. On March 8, the Phoenix entry list was released, with the additions of Michel Jourdain Jr., Jim Guthrie and Dan Drinan with the teams they had tested for. The newly renamed Team Scandia appointed Fermín Vélez, their IMSA GT champion, to sub for Eliseo Salazar, who had not recovered in time from the injuries sustained at Walt Disney World. Bill Tempero, Rick DeLorto and Butch Brickell, who remained entered despite his injuries, would be absent. A few days earlier, Beck Motorsports and Zunne Group ended their partnership and Beck had to sit out the Phoenix race, as Zunne had the ownership of the cars. They allowed Robbie Buhl to compete in the No. 45 car for Zunne Group, who had McCormack Motorsports run their racing activities. One week later, a revised entry list featured Silver Crown competitor Paul Durant, driving for a new team, ABF Motorsports.

During this hiatus, the IRL started shaping itself for the immediate future. On February 14, Nissan announced their commitment to supply Infiniti-badged engines from 1997, joining Oldsmobile. Despite this, negotiations with CART were restarted, and on February 23, IMS president Tony George sent a memo to IRL teams, specifying that the discussions included "expanding the starting field at Indianapolis" to 42 cars to allow CART teams to qualify, while maintaining the commitment to the top 25 IRL teams. Amid reports that the U. S. 500 had been cancelled, IndyCar president Andrew Craig confirmed that the proposed terms had been dismissed by the IndyCar Board of Directors, arguing they were "not prepared to drop out plans to the U. S. 500", while proposing discussions for "a long-term solution for 1997 and beyond". On February 27, Tony George said there had been "no offer of any sort" from any part.

== Practice & Qualifying Report ==
Two further drivers were added to the field on race weekend: Johnny Unser, who had failed to qualify for the event two years earlier, was entered by Project Indy, and Racin Gardner came back on Tempero/Giuffre Racing's second car. Alongside Paul Durant, a special orientation session was arranged on Thursday to allow them to pass their driver test: while Durant passed his on Friday morning practice, Unser and Gardner, whose car stalled on Turn 1, did not complete all phases. The session was led by Tony Stewart, the only driver to go over 180 mph with a 180.144 mph lap, followed by former winners Arie Luyendyk and Roberto Guerrero, two of the 12 entered drivers with previous Indy car experience at the track, and the only ones who had started the 1995 race alongside Eddie Cheever, who had finished 2nd in 1992. Buddy Lazier, John Paul Jr., Mike Groff and Scott Sharp had taken part in the 1994 edition, while Scott Brayton, Lyn St. James, Robbie Buhl and David Kudrave lined up in the 1993 grid.

Friday afternoon practice, affected by heavy winds, was marred by three hard crashes. Nine minutes into the session, Eddie Cheever crashed between Turns 3 and 4, sustaining a concussion and pain in his shoulder. Half an hour later, Stan Wattles had another accident in Turn 2, in which he suffered a parietal lobe hematoma and an optic nerve injury. Less than 20 minutes later, Buddy Lazier lost control of his car in Turn 2 after suffering a rear wing failure and crashed backwards into the wall, collecting Lyn St. James, who bounced off the track and hit the retaining fence with the back end of the car. St. James was unhurt, but Lazier had to be airlifted to St. Joseph's Hospital, being diagnosed with multiple hairline fractures in his back and two fractures in his pelvis. The crash caused a gouge on the asphalt, bringing an early end to the session. The three injured drivers were ruled out of the event on medical grounds.

On Saturday, USAC allowed the Buick and the Menard-branded engines to increase their boost pressure from 55 to 60 inches, something they had approved on some cars at Walt Disney World, to make the field more competitive, although they would have to turn it down at some stages during the race. Arie Luyendyk, the most experienced driver at Phoenix alongside Scott Brayton with 11 starts, upped his speed to lead the morning practice with a 182.454 mph lap, in front of Richie Hearn and Tony Stewart. Johnny Unser completed his refresher test, but Racin Gardner was unable to complete his driver's test after suffering an early oil leak that could not be fixed in time, being discarded from the event. Also, Dan Drinan suffered mechanical issues for the second day in a row, this time with a new engine, and was not able to qualify for the race.

In the qualifying session, Luyendyk went on to grab the second pole position of his career with a track record lap of 183.599 mph. Hearn got within a tenth off Luyendyk's time, placing on the front row again, while Roberto Guerrero beat Tony Stewart for the third spot by just 0.001 s. Championship leader Buzz Calkins settled for eighth, nearing 176 mph and surrounded by Foyt's drivers, including a career-best seventh place for Mike Groff. Again, there were sizeable performance differentials, as sixth-placed Scott Sharp had a margin of nearly half a second over Groff. At the back, Michele Alboreto had to pull-in at the end of his first lap with fuel system problems, and was the slowest qualifier. Among the four newcomers, Michel Jourdain Jr. was the only one to qualify over 170 mph, in 14th place, beating Vélez, Durant and Guthrie. At 19 years, 5 months and 19 days, Jourdain would become the third-youngest driver ever to contest an Indy car race at the time, behind compatriot Josele Garza and Troy Ruttman.

Lyn St. James could not qualify due to her primary chassis being destroyed, but was able to get out on track on the afternoon practice with her back-up car, and was allowed to start the race at the back of the field despite lapping at just 150 mph. In this session, Billy Roe, who was at Phoenix trying to beat the closed-course record for an electric-powered Indy car, was appointed by Tempero/Giuffre to drive what had been Gardner's car, hoping they would be allowed to make the race. Roe got it up to 153 mph, but his engine let go after just 10 laps, and the team, out of powerplants and time, parked the car for good.

=== Qualifying Results ===
| Pos | No. | Name | Lap 1 | Lap 2 | Best (in mph) |
|---|---|---|---|---|---|
| 1 | 5 | (Netherlands) Arie Luyendyk W | 19.608 | 19.675 | 183.599 |
| 2 | 4 | (United States) Richie Hearn R | 19.905 | 19.694 | 182.797 |
| 3 | 21 | (Colombia) Roberto Guerrero W | 20.133 | 19.884 | 181.050 |
| 4 | 20 | (United States) Tony Stewart R | 20.065 | 19.885 | 181.041 |
| 5 | 2 | (United States) Scott Brayton | 20.057 | 19.963 | 180.334 |
| 6 | 11 | (United States) Scott Sharp | 20.034 | 19.982 | 180.162 |
| 7 | 41 | (United States) Mike Groff | 20.541 | 20.441 | 176.117 |
| 8 | 12 | (United States) Buzz Calkins R | 20.753 | 20.465 | 175.910 |
| 9 | 14 | (United States) Davey Hamilton R | 20.665 | 20.505 | 175.567 |
| 10 | 75 | (United States) Johnny O'Connell R | 20.804 | 20.611 | 174.664 |
| 11 | 45 | (United States) Robbie Buhl | 21.134 | 20.773 | 173.302 |
| 12 | 9 | (France) Stéphan Grégoire R | 21.152 | 20.830 | 172.828 |
| 13 | 18 | (United States) John Paul Jr. | 21.170 | 20.966 | 171.707 |
| 14 | 22 | (Mexico) Michel Jourdain Jr. R | 21.038 | 21.069 | 171.119 |
| 15 | 7 | (Spain) Fermín Vélez R | 21.565 | 21.326 | 168.808 |
| 16 | 96 | (United States) Paul Durant R | 21.632 | 21.355 | 168.579 |
| 17 | 16 | (United States) Johnny Parsons | 21.772 | 22.732 | 165.350 |
| 18 | 27 | (United States) Jim Guthrie R | 22.673 | 22.019 | 163.495 |
| 19 | 64 | (United States) Johnny Unser | 22.518 | 22.218 | 162.031 |
| 20 | 15 | (United States) David Kudrave | 22.869 | 22.363 | 160.980 |
| 21 | 33 | (Italy) Michele Alboreto R | Waved off | 22.408 | 160.657 |
| 22 | 90 | (United States) Lyn St. James^{1} | Didn't qualify | | No speed |

1. Couldn't qualify after her chassis had been damaged in a practice crash. She was allowed to start the race at the back of the field.

| Key | Meaning |
|---|---|
| R | Rookie |
| W | Past winner |

==== Withdrew ====
- (United States) Eddie Cheever for Team Menard (Injured)
- (United States) Stan Wattles R for Leigh Miller Racing (Injured)
- (United States) Buddy Lazier for Hemelgarn Racing (Injured)
- (United States) Dan Drinan R for Blueprint Racing
- (United States) Racin Gardner R for Tempero/Giuffre Racing (Incomplete rookie drivers test)
- (United States) Billy Roe R for Tempero/Giuffre Racing (Out of engines)

== Race Report ==
Having lost a total of 5 entries since practice began, 22 cars took the green flag in front of 32,000 spectators. Arie Luyendyk held onto the lead, while Richie Hearn was surpassed by both Roberto Guerrero and Tony Stewart. The race was first neutralized on Lap 3, when the championship leader Buzz Calkins, running in 11th place, spun at Turn 2. After the restart, Luyendyk was unable to open a gap, his car reportedly being loose, which allowed the top 4 to run closely for a few laps. By Lap 27, Tony Stewart and Richie Hearn had overtaken Luyendyk and Guerrero, who would also pass the Dutch shortly after, despite an issue with the brake cooling.

On Lap 33, Michel Jourdain Jr., taking the inside lane of Turn 3 in heavy traffic, lost control of the car and crashed, bringing out the second yellow. In the aftermath, first-timer Fermín Vélez failed to judge the braking distance and rammed into Guerrero, who had slowed down to avoid the wreck. Guerrero had to enter the pits to repair the damage and was not a factor for the remainder of the race, retiring after 89 laps. During the caution, Stewart completed his first stop, but the air jack hose malfunctioned, and the race leader was overtaken by Luyendyk, fourth placed Scott Brayton and sixth placed Robbie Buhl, who had also pitted.

Richie Hearn elected not to pit, as well as Scott Sharp, Johnny O'Connell, Mike Groff and Davey Hamilton, and tried to lead the field to a restart on Lap 43, but he spun on Turn 3, delaying the green flag for six laps, with O'Connell pitting in between. That left the top 3 positions dominated by Foyt drivers, although Hamilton would lose four positions after the race was resumed. Stewart started climbing back, overtaking Hamilton, Brayton and Buhl in less than 15 laps, and catching Luyendyk. On Lap 73, Brayton, running seventh, crashed heavily on Turn 4, and required the use of a stretcher to get into an ambulance, but he suffered no major injuries. Pit stops under caution followed for the Foyt trio and Stewart, who stalled his car and fell to sixth place, as the last driver on the lead lap. He recovered one position when Hamilton entered the pits for a second time, with electronic issues that led to his retirement from the race.

Luyendyk and Buhl, by not pitting, claimed the top 2 spots for the Lap 81 restart, on which Groff had already gained the position on Sharp by pitting a lap earlier than him. Eleven laps later, Stewart passed both Sharp and Groff, who also lost position to his teammate, before going one lap down a few minutes later. Buhl managed to stay within two seconds of Luyendyk and, when handling issues reappeared for the Dutchman, took the lead on Lap 103. Stewart would also catch and pass Luyendyk on Lap 106, but he immediately slowed down on the dogleg with a punctured right front tyre. He emerged from the pits in seventh place, one lap down. Buhl, who had opened a 6 second-gap, made his second pit stop on Lap 118, being on the edge of needing a late splash, and Luyendyk, who lost second place to Sharp on Lap 120, followed suit 7 laps later.

Jim Guthrie, running in 15th and last place at the time, had a sizeable crash exiting Turn 2 on Lap 128, bringing a caution that would determine the fate of the race. Despite the fact that the pits were closed, with the signalling lights at the entry switched on, Sharp and Groff went in for their final pit stop. Both gained a lap over the field in the process, even with Sharp stalling his car before being push-started by his crew and teammate Hamilton. The stewards, subsequently, decided to punish both drivers with a one-lap penalty. Team owner A. J. Foyt argued that other drivers had been serviced in closed pits in an earlier caution, but the protest was to no avail.

Buhl also entered the (now open) pits on Lap 133 to top off on fuel, falling to third place behind Luyendyk and Sharp. Being one lap down again, Groff had retained the fourth spot in front of Stewart. When the race was restarted on Lap 136, Luyendyk's car finally had a good balance, which helped him to slowly open an 8-second lead over Sharp. Buhl could not follow suit, and eventually dropped out of the race on Lap 149 when his engine expired. Stewart was set for a top-3 result after passing Groff, but he also had to retire on Lap 168 with a valve train problem.

Luyendyk kept a gap of around five to ten seconds for the remainder of the race, and went on to grab the fourth win of his Indy car career, the second at Phoenix and the first since the 1991 Bosch Spark Plug Grand Prix at Nazareth. For Sharp, who ended up completing 201 race laps, and Groff, it was the first podium of their careers, while Hearn got to finish in fourth place. In his second Indy car race, Johnny O'Connell had a steady drive, and finished in the top 5 despite serving a Stop & Go on Lap 138 for running over a fuel hose. Albeit seven laps down, Buzz Calkins' sixth-place finish allowed him to remain as the Indy Racing League points leader heading to the season ending Indianapolis 500.

== Race results ==
=== Box Score ===
| Pos | No. | Driver | Team | Chassis | Engine | Tire | Laps | Time/Retired | Grid | Laps Led | Points |
|---|---|---|---|---|---|---|---|---|---|---|---|
| 1 | 5 | (Netherlands) Arie Luyendyk W | Byrd/Treadway Racing | Reynard 95I | Ford Cosworth XB | F | 200 | 1:42:14.000 | 1 | 122 | 35 |
| 2 | 11 | (United States) Scott Sharp | A. J. Foyt Enterprises | Lola T9400 | Ford Cosworth XB | G | 200* | + 8.896 | 6 | 40 | 33 |
| 3 | 41 | (United States) Mike Groff | A. J. Foyt Enterprises | Lola T9500 | Ford Cosworth XB | G | 199* | + 1 lap | 7 | 0 | 32 |
| 4 | 4 | (United States) Richie Hearn R | Della Penna Motorsports | Reynard 95I | Ford Cosworth XB | G | 198 | + 2 laps | 2 | 7 | 31 |
| 5 | 75 | (United States) Johnny O'Connell R | Cunningham Racing | Reynard 95I | Ford Cosworth XB | F | 197 | + 3 laps | 10 | 0 | 30 |
| 6 | 12 | (United States) Buzz Calkins R | Bradley Motorsports | Reynard 95I | Ford Cosworth XB | F | 193 | + 7 laps | 8 | 0 | 29 |
| 7 | 9 | (France) Stéphan Grégoire R | Hemelgarn Racing | Reynard 95I | Ford Cosworth XB | F | 190 | + 10 laps | 12 | 0 | 28 |
| 8 | 33 | (Italy) Michele Alboreto R | Team Scandia | Lola T9500 | Ford Cosworth XB | G | 187 | + 13 laps | 21 | 0 | 27 |
| 9 | 64 | (United States) Johnny Unser | Project Indy | Reynard 94I | Ford Cosworth XB | G | 185 | + 15 laps | 19 | 0 | 26 |
| 10 | 15 | (United States) David Kudrave | Tempero/Giuffre Racing | Lola T9300 | Buick Indy V-6 | G | 168 | Out of Fuel | 20 | 0 | 25 |
| 11 | 20 | (United States) Tony Stewart R | Team Menard | Lola T9500 | Menard Indy V-6 | F | 165 | Electrical | 4 | 11 | 24 |
| 12 | 16 | (United States) Johnny Parsons | Blueprint Racing | Lola T9300 | Menard Indy V-6 | F | 149 | Fuel pump | 17 | 0 | 23 |
| 13 | 45 | (United States) Robbie Buhl | Zunne Group Racing | Lola T9400 | Ford Cosworth XB | F | 148 | Header | 11 | 20 | 22 |
| 14 | 18 | (United States) John Paul Jr. | PDM Racing | Lola T9300 | Menard Indy V-6 | G | 116 | Engine | 13 | 0 | 21 |
| 15 | 27 | (United States) Jim Guthrie R | Blueprint Racing | Lola T9300 | Menard Indy V-6 | F | 115 | Accident | 18 | 0 | 20 |
| 16 | 21 | (Colombia) Roberto Guerrero W | Pagan Racing | Reynard 94I | Ford Cosworth XB | G | 89 | CV Joint | 3 | 0 | 19 |
| 17 | 14 | (United States) Davey Hamilton R | A. J. Foyt Enterprises | Lola T9500 | Ford Cosworth XB | G | 77 | Electrical | 9 | 0 | 18 |
| 18 | 2 | (United States) Scott Brayton | Team Menard | Lola T9500 | Menard Indy V-6 | F | 70 | Accident | 5 | 0 | 17 |
| 19 | 7 | (Spain) Fermín Vélez R | Team Scandia | Lola T9500 | Ford Cosworth XB | G | 32 | Accident | 15 | 0 | 16 |
| 20 | 22 | (Mexico) Michel Jourdain Jr. R | Team Scandia | Lola T9500 | Ford Cosworth XB | G | 31 | Accident | 14 | 0 | 15 |
| 21 | 90 | (United States) Lyn St. James | Team Scandia | Lola T9400 | Ford Cosworth XB | G | 11 | Electrical | 22 | 0 | 14 |
| 22 | 96 | (United States) Paul Durant R | ABF Motorsports | Lola T9200 | Buick Indy V-6 | G | 1 | Nose cone | 16 | 0 | 13 |

=== Race Statistics ===
- Average Speed: 117.368 mph (188.885 km/h)
- Lead changes: 9 among 5 drivers

Lap Leaders
| From Lap | To Lap | Total Laps | Leader |
|---|---|---|---|
| 1 | 24 | 24 | Arie Luyendyk |
| 25 | 35 | 11 | Tony Stewart |
| 36 | 42 | 7 | Richie Hearn |
| 43 | 74 | 32 | Scott Sharp |
| 75 | 102 | 28 | Arie Luyendyk |
| 103 | 117 | 15 | Robbie Buhl |
| 118 | 120 | 3 | Arie Luyendyk |
| 121 | 128 | 8 | Scott Sharp |
| 129 | 133 | 5 | Robbie Buhl |
| 134 | 200 | 67 | Arie Luyendyk |

Cautions: 4 for 37 laps
| From Lap | To Lap | Total Laps | Reason |
|---|---|---|---|
| 3 | 7 | 5 | #12 (Calkins) spin |
| 33 | 47 | 15 | #22 (Jourdain), #21 (Guerrero) and #7 (Vélez) crash; #4 (Hearn) spin |
| 72 | 80 | 9 | #2 (Brayton) crash |
| 128 | 135 | 8 | #27 (Guthrie) crash |

== Standings after the race ==
Drivers' Championship standings

| Pos | Driver | Points |
|---|---|---|
| 1 | (United States) Buzz Calkins | 128 |
| 2 | (United States) Mike Groff | 122 |
| 3= | (United States) Johnny O'Connell | 116 |
| 3= | (Italy) Michele Alboreto | 116 |
| 5= | (United States) Scott Sharp | 114 |
| 5= | (United States) Tony Stewart | 114 |

- Note: Only the top five positions are included for the standings.

== Broadcasting ==
The second race as part of the Indy Racing League was carried live on the IMS Radio Network. Gary Lee served as chief announcer. In the booth with Lee was Chris McClure.

Mike King and Dave Calabro were the pit reporters.

Indianapolis Motor Speedway Radio Network
| Booth Announcers | Pit/garage reporters |
|---|---|
| Chief Announcer: Gary Lee; Statistician/Commentary: Chris McClure | Mike King; Dave Calabro |
