= Johnny Parsons =

American racing driver (born 1944)

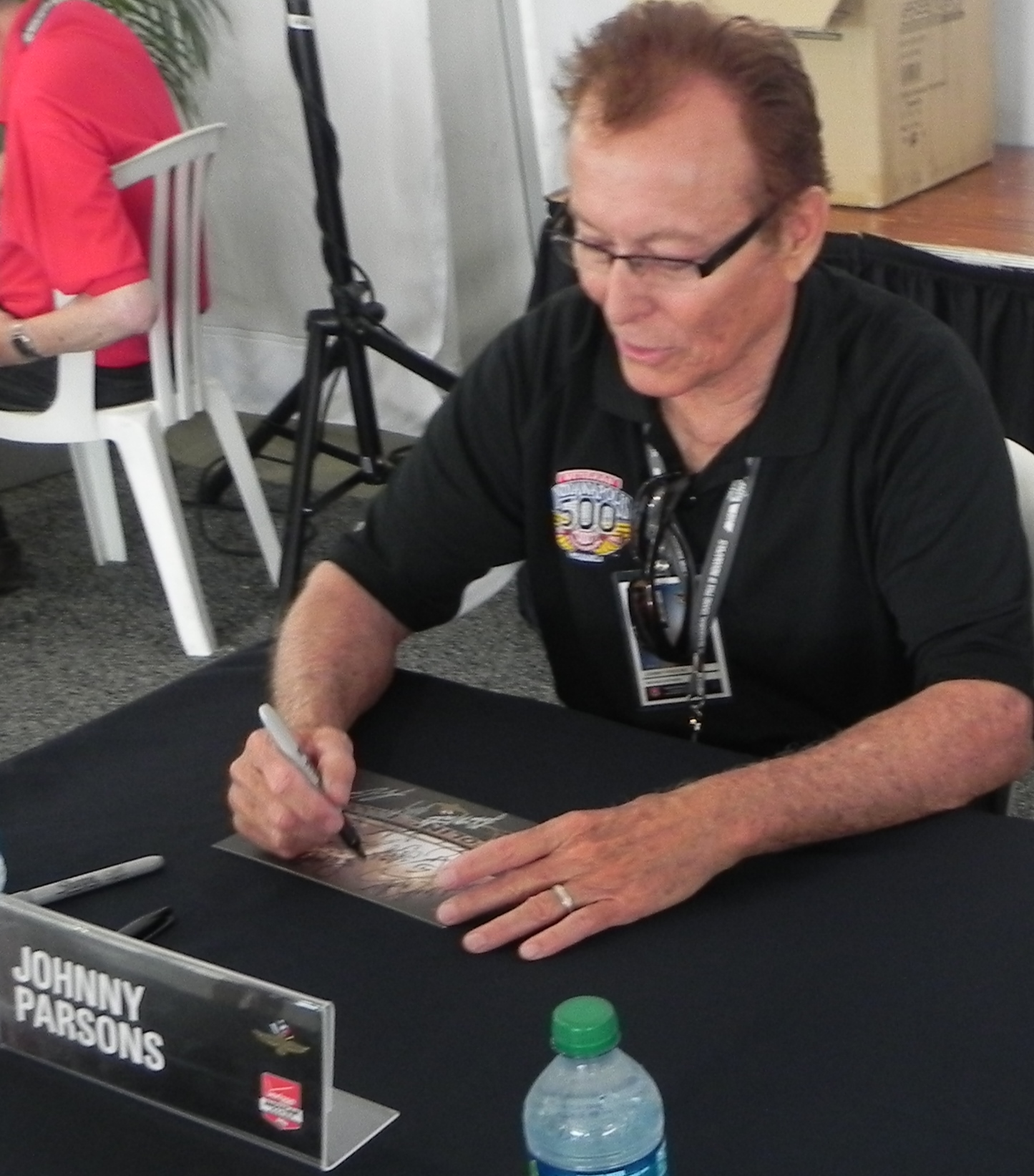
- Parsons in 2014
- Born: John Wayne Parsons; August 26, 1944 (age 82) Los Angeles, California, U.S.

Champ Car career
- 102 races run over 26 years
- Years active: 1969-1989, 1991-1995
- Best finish: 10th – 1976
- First race: 1969 Golden State 100 (Sacramento)
- Last race: 1991 Miller Genuine Draft 200 (Milwaukee)
Wins	Podiums	Poles
0	2	2

IndyCar Series career
- 4 races run over 2 years
- Best finish: 17th – 1996
- First race: 1996 Indy 200 at Walt Disney World (Orlando)
- Last race: 1996 Las Vegas 500K (Las Vegas)
Wins	Podiums	Poles
0	0	0

John Wayne Parsons (born August 26, 1944 in Van Nuys, California) is an American race car driver. He is the son of 1950 Indianapolis 500 winner Johnnie Parsons. He drove Indy cars in the USAC National Championship, and also drove USAC championship dirt cars.

Parsons made twelve starts at the Indianapolis 500, with a best finish of fifth in 1977 and 1985.

== Racing career ==
Parsons started twelve Indianapolis 500 races. His last Indy 500 start was the 1996 race.

Parsons finished second in the 1977 USAC National points. Parsons has also twice finished second in the USAC championship dirt cars.

Parsons won 29 midget car features (as of 1994), including major wins at: the 4-Crown Nationals midget car feature twice, the 1979 Hut Hundred, and the 1986 Copper World Classic midget feature. He has won two Silver Crown and five sprint car features.

When Davey Hamilton decided to come out of retirement to run in the 2007 Indy 500, Parsons replaced him as the driver expert for the Indianapolis Motor Speedway Radio Network's broadcasts of race activities.

== Racing family ==
Parsons is the son of Johnnie Parsons and Arza Parsons (née Mitchell). His parents divorced, and Johnny was raised with half-brothers Dana Carter and Duane "Pancho" Carter Jr., the product of Arza's marriage with Duane Carter Sr. The Carters grew up racing quarter-midgets in Indianapolis. His first name is spelled differently than his father's. Though not his legal name, he was sometimes referred to in the media as "Johnny Parsons Jr." to distinguish him from his father.

== Career award ==
- Parsons was inducted in the National Midget Auto Racing Hall of Fame in 1994.

== Racing record ==
=== Complete USAC Mini-Indy Series results ===
Year	Entrant	1	2	3	4	5	6	7	8	Pos	Points
1977		TRE	MIL	MOS	PIR; DNS					-	-
1979		TEX1	IRP	MIL1; 4	POC; 19	TEX2	MIL2; 22	MIN1; 21	MIN2; 4	11th	250

=== IRL IndyCar Series ===
Year	Team	Chassis	No.	Engine	1	2	3	4	5	6	7	8	9	10	Rank	Points	Ref
1996	Blueprint Racing	Lola T93	16	Menard	WDW; 18	PHX; 12	INDY; 28								17th	141	
1996-97	Blueprint Racing	Lola T93	16	Buick	NH1	LV1; 28	WDW	PHX	INDY	TEX	PIK	CMS	NH2	LV2	51st	7	

=== Indianapolis 500 results ===
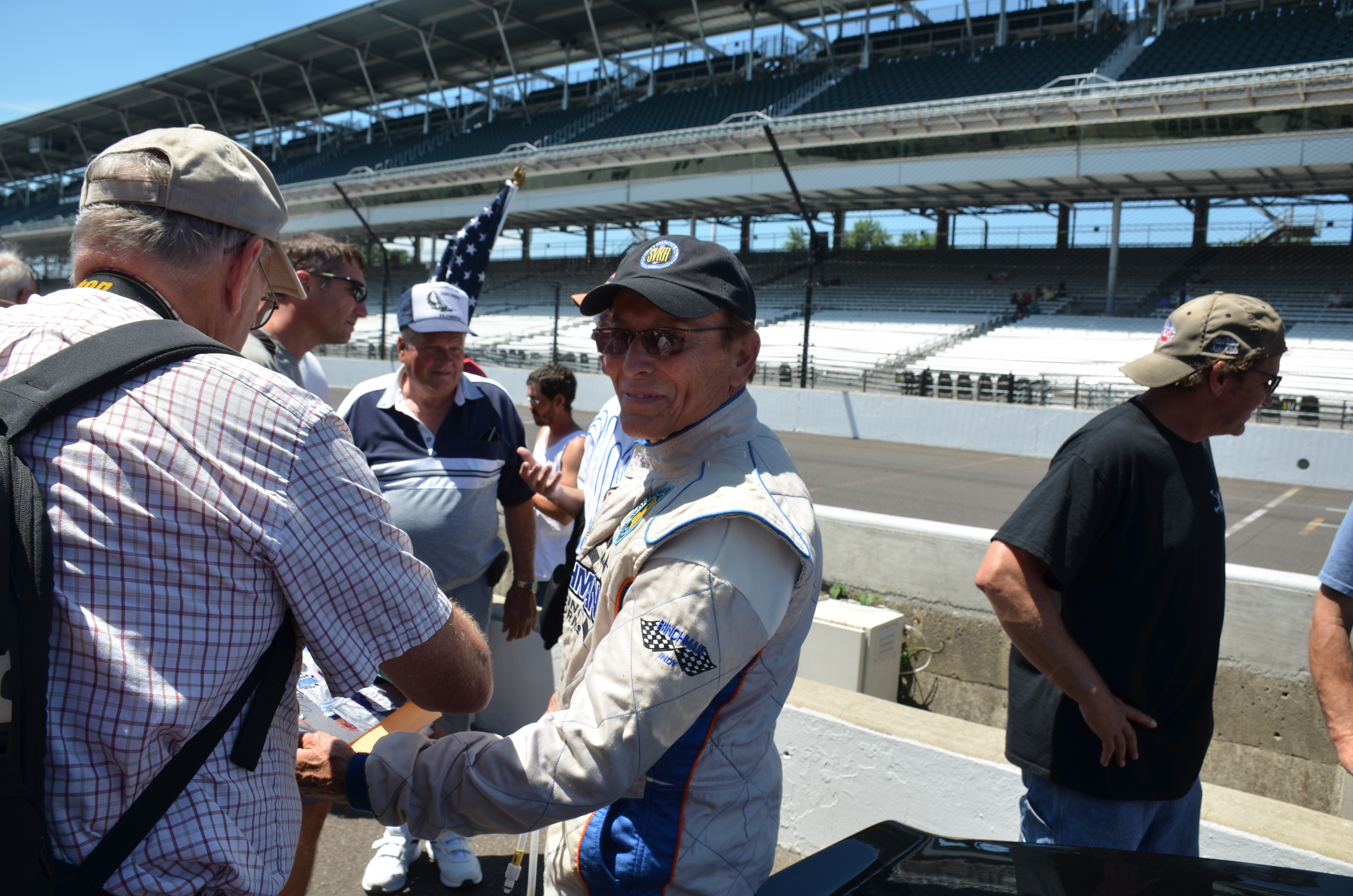
Johnny Parsons at the 2016 Brickyard SVRA Pro-Am race at the Indianapolis Motor Speedway.

Year	Chassis	Engine	Start	Finish
1969			Failed to Qualify	
1973	King	Offy	Practice Crash	
1974	Finley	Offy	29th	26th
1975	Eagle	Offy	12th	19th
1976	Eagle	Offy	14th	12th
1977	Wildcat	DGS	11th	5th
1978	Lightning	Offy	8th	10th
1979	Lightning	DGS	9th	32nd
1980	Lightning	Offy	7th	26th
1981	Lightning	Chevrolet	Failed to Qualify	
1982	March	Cosworth	25th	20th
1983	Penske	Cosworth	23rd	22nd
1984	Penske	Cosworth	Failed to Qualify	
1985	March	Cosworth	26th	5th
1986	March	Cosworth	28th	27th
1987	March	Buick	Failed to Qualify	
1988	March	Cosworth	Failed to Qualify	
1989	March/Lola	Cosworth	Failed to Qualify	
1991	Lola	Cosworth	Failed to Qualify	
1992	Lola	Buick	Failed to Qualify	
1993		Chevrolet	Failed to Qualify	
1994	Lola	Greenfield	Failed to Qualify	
1995	Reynard	Ford-Cosworth	Failed to Qualify	
1996	Lola	Menard-Buick	27th	28th
