= Byrd Racing =

Racing team in the IndyCar Series

(United States) Byrd Racing
- Founded: 1982
- Team principal(s): David Byrd; Jonathan Byrd II; Ginny Byrd
- Current series: NASCAR Cup Series
- Current drivers: NASCAR Cup Series: (Australia) 15. James Davison
- Website: http://www.byrdracing.com/

Byrd Racing is an American racing team in the IndyCar Series. The team is owned by Virginia (Ginny) Byrd and her sons David and Jonathan Byrd II. They also run select races in partnership with Rick Ware Racing starting in select races in 2020 in the NASCAR Cup Series, the partnership continued in the NASCAR Cup Series in 2021 with James Davison in the No. 15. They also partnered for the 2020 Indy 500 with Rick Ware Racing and Dale Coyne Racing.

== Early history (1982–2001) ==
Jonathan Byrd's Racing was created in 1982 by business owner Jonathan Byrd and initially ran Pro Stock with driver Jim Begley. Later, they won a few USAC Midget car championships with Rich Vogler. The team first entered the Indianapolis 500 in 1985 with Vogler. Vogler ran for the Byrd team at Indianapolis from 1985-1990, with a best finish of eighth in 1989. The death of team manager Andy Kenopensky from cancer caused the team to be merged with Hemelgarn Racing. Stan Fox replaced drivers Rich Vogler and Billy Vukovich III, who both died in sprint car accidents before racing at the 1991 Indianapolis 500. Fox would finish eighth in 1991. Gordon Johncock came out of retirement to qualify Stan Fox's backup car, fell ill before the race due to the flu and an allergic reaction, but was able to compete and finish sixth. Buddy Lazier would also race for the team, finishing thirty-third. Stan Fox and Gordon Johncock returned as drivers for the 1992 Indianapolis 500.

Scott Brayton drove for Dick Simon and Byrd at the 1993 Indianapolis 500 and finished sixth. Byrd joined with A. J. Foyt Enterprises to field cars at the 1994 Indianapolis 500 for Double Duty driver John Andretti, who finished tenth. Davy Jones drove for the Jonathan Byrd and Dick Simon in the 1995 Indianapolis 500. The team won the Dura-Lube 200 with Arie Luyendyk at Phoenix International Raceway in 1996. While partnering with Treadway Racing in 1996, Arie Luyendyk broke the track record for Indianapolis Motor Speedway. Luyendyk suffered from two failed engines, switching to a backup car, and his initial pole time disqualified due to the car being underweight by seven pounds before setting the record.

Mike Groff drove for Clayton Cunningham and Byrd in the 1996–97 Indy Racing League season. Byrd-Cunningham driver John Paul Jr. won in the 1998 Lone Star 500 at Texas Motor Speedway. Jonathan Byrd's Racing suspended operations after the 1999 Indianapolis 500. This was due to sponsorship issues and the VisionAire 500K. Byrd completed regularly until the 2001 Indianapolis 500 with Jaques Lazier as that year's driver. Jonathan Byrd had a stroke in 2004 after heart surgery, suffered paralysis on his right side, and died in 2009 from cardiac arrest.

== Byrd Brothers (2005) ==
Byrd Brothers completed at the 2005 Indianapolis 500 with Buddy Lazier as driver in a partnership with Panther Racing. David and Jonathan, Byrd's sons, organized the team and worked with PR/sponsors. Lazier suffered an accident due to a suspension failure on Carb Day, but after significant repairs would finish fifth in the 500.

== Reformation (2014–2016, 2018–2019) ==
The team announced plans to return at the 2015 Indianapolis 500 with driver Bryan Clauson and support from KVSH Racing. Jonathan Byrd's Racing was originally intended to return at the 2016 Indianapolis 500, but plans were moved forward a year. Bryan Clauson would qualify in last position (33rd) for the 2015 Indianapolis 500, beating Buddy Lazier. Due to driver changes by other teams, Clauson would start 30th, and wrecked in Turn 4 on Lap 61 finishing 31st.

Jonathan Byrd's Racing attempted the 2016 Indianapolis 500 with returning driver Bryan Clauson and support from Dale Coyne Racing. He qualified 28th, would lead laps 97-99, and finished 23rd completing 198 laps. Clauson was the first driver racing for Byrd to lead laps in the Indianapolis 500, and finished the most 500 laps in his career. The team was unsure if they would continue racing due to the death of Clauson in August 2016, and did not enter the 2017 Indianapolis 500.

Belardi Auto Racing partnered with Byrd, Baldwin Brothers Racing, and driver Chris Windom to enter the 2018 Indy Lights Freedom 100. Windom wrecked his car in testing and could not compete in the race. Byrd with driver James Davison entered the 2018 Indianapolis 500. The team partnership included A. J. Foyt Enterprises, Belardi Auto Racing, and Hollinger MotorSport (Brad Hollinger). Davison wrecked on Fast Friday, but the team repaired the car for Saturday qualifying, and almost didn't make the race. They would qualify 19th for race, but finish 33rd after wrecking in turns 3 and 4 on lap 47 due to car issues.

Byrd joined with Belardi Auto Racing, Dale Coyne Racing and Hollinger MotorSport (Brad Hollinger) to enter driver James Davison in the 2019 Indianapolis 500. Belardi Auto Racing partnered with Byrd and driver Chris Windom to enter the 2019 Indy Lights Freedom 100. Windom raced in the Freedom 100 and was involved in a serious accident, despite having a serious sprint car accident the day before. Davison would quality 15th for the Indianapolis 500, have an incident on pit line, and finish 12th.

Byrd was not going to field an entry in the 2020 Indianapolis 500 due to financial issues, but later joined with Belardi Auto Racing, Dale Coyne Racing, and Rick Ware Racing to enter driver James Davison. Davison qualified 27th, but due to a brake and wheel fire finished 33rd.

== Racing results ==
=== Complete IndyCar results ===
(key)

Year	Chassis	Engine	Drivers	no.	1	2	3	4	5	6	7	8	9	10	11	12	13	14	15	16	17	Pos.	Pts.
1996					WDW	PHX	INDY																
1996	Reynard 95I	Ford-Cosworth XB	(Netherlands) Arie Luyendyk^{1}	5	14	1*	16																
1996	Lola T95I	Ford-Cosworth XB	(United States) Johnny O'Connell^{2}	75	7																		
1996	Reynard T95I	Ford-Cosworth XB	(United States) Johnny O'Connell^{2}	75		5	29																
1996–97^{2}					NHA	LSV	WDW	PHX	INDY	TXS	PPIR	CLT	NHA	LSV									
1996–97^{2}	Reynard 95I	Ford-Cosworth XB	(United States) Mike Groff	10	4	3																	
1996–97^{2}	G-Force GF01	Nissan Infiniti V8	(United States) Mike Groff	10			2	6	12	Wth													
1996–97^{2}	G-Force GF01	Oldsmobile Aurora V8	(United States) Mike Groff	10								14	Wth										
1996–97^{2}	G-Force GF01	Nissan Infiniti V8	(United States) Johnny Unser	10						10													
1996–97^{2}	G-Force GF01	Oldsmobile Aurora V8	(United States) Johnny Unser	10							21		13										
1996–97^{2}	G-Force GF01	Oldsmobile Aurora V8	(United States) Paul Durant (R)	10										26									
1998^{2}					WDW	PHX	INDY	TXS	NHA	DOV	CLT	PPIR	ATL	TXS	LSV								
1998^{2}	G-Force GF01B	Oldsmobile Aurora V8	(United States) Mike Groff	10	7	15	15																
1998^{2}	G-Force GF01B	Oldsmobile Aurora V8	(United States) Brian Tyler (R)	10			DNQ																
1998^{2}	G-Force GF01B	Oldsmobile Aurora V8	(United States) John Paul Jr.	10				16	26	21	6	15	23	1	4								
1999^{2}					WDW	PHX	CLT	INDY	TXS	PPIR	ATL	DOV	PPIR	LSV	TXS								
1999^{2}	G-Force GF01B	Oldsmobile Aurora V8	(United States) John Paul Jr.	10	11	22	C^{3}	DNQ															
1999^{2}	G-Force GF01B	Oldsmobile Aurora V8	(United States) Andy Michner	10				DNQ															
2000^{4}					WDW	PHX	LSV	INDY	TXS	PPIR	ATL	KTY	TXS										
2000^{4}	G-Force GF01B; Riley & Scott Mk V	Oldsmobile Aurora V8	(United States) Jon Herb	30	22																		
2000^{4}	G-Force GF01B; Riley & Scott Mk V	Oldsmobile Aurora V8	(United States) Ronnie Johncox	30		14	13	DNQ	DNS														
2000^{4}	G-Force GF01B; Riley & Scott Mk V	Oldsmobile Aurora V8	(United States) Robby Unser	30				DNQ	26	21													
2000^{4}	G-Force GF01B; Riley & Scott Mk V	Oldsmobile Aurora V8	(United States) J. J. Yeley	30							17	15	25										
2001^{5}					PHX	HMS	ATL	INDY	TXS	PPIR	RIR	KAN	NSH	KTY	GAT	CHI	TXS						
2001^{5}	G-Force GF05B	Oldsmobile Aurora V8	(United States) Jaques Lazier	77				22	9	17													
2005^{6}					HMS	PHX	STP	MOT	INDY	TXS	RIR	KAN	NSH	MIL	MCH	KTY	PPIR	SNM	CHI	WGL	FON		
2005^{6}	Dallara IR-05	Chevrolet Indy V8	(United States) Buddy Lazier	95					5														
2015^{7}					STP	NLA	LBH	ALA	IMS	INDY	DET		TXS	TOR	FON	MIL	IOW	MDO	POC	SNM			
2015^{7}	Dallara DW12	Chevrolet IndyCar V6t	(United States) Bryan Clauson R	88						31												39th*	10*
2016^{8}					STP	PHX	LBH	ALA	IMS	INDY	DET		ROA	IOW	TOR	MDO	POC	TXS	WGL	SNM			
2016^{8}	Dallara DW12	Honda IndyCar V6t	(United States) Bryan Clauson R	88						23												33rd*	21*
2018					STP	PHX	LBH	ALA	IMS	INDY	DET		TEX	ROA	IOW	TOR	MDO	POC	GAT	POR	SNM		
2018	Dallara DW12	Chevrolet IndyCar V6t	(Australia) James Davison R	33						33												41st*	10*
2019	Dallara DW12	Honda HI19TT V6t			STP	COTA	ALA	LBH	IMS	INDY	DET		TEX	ROA	TOR	IOW	MDO	POC	GAT	POR	LAG		
2019	Dallara DW12	Honda HI19TT V6t	(Australia) James Davison R	33						12												28th*	36*
Dale Coyne Racing with Rick Ware Racing & Byrd Belardi
2020					TEX	IMS	ROA		IOW		INDY	GTW		MDO		IMS		STP					
2020	Dallara DW12	Honda HI20TT V6t	(Australia) James Davison R	51							33											34th	10

1. Run in conjunction with Treadway Racing.
2. Run in conjunction with Cunningham Racing.
3. The 1999 VisionAire 500K at Charlotte was cancelled after 79 laps due to spectator fatalities.
4. Run in conjunction with McCormack Motorsports.
5. Run in conjunction with Team Xtreme Racing.
6. Run in conjunction with Panther Racing.
7. With support from KV Racing Technology.
8. With support from Dale Coyne Racing.
