= Rick DeLorto =

American racing driver

Rick DeLorto (born August 18, 1949 in Wood Dale, Illinois) is an American racing driver. He attempted to race in two CART Championship Car races in the fall of 1982 (during their split with USAC) at the Milwaukee Mile and Road America but failed to make the field in both races. In 1985 and 1986, DeLorto made seven starts in the professional Formula Super Vee Robert Bosch/Valvoline Championship. He competed in two American Indycar Series races in 1989. After returning to amateur racing, DeLorto reappeared for the first race of the new Indy Racing League in the 1996 Indy 200 at Walt Disney World. He tested in a four-year-old Buick powered Lola chassis but did not complete his drivers test and was not allowed to qualify. However he still earned $10,000 for his entry.

DeLorto was evidently still active in high-level amateur SCCA racing as of 2006.

== IRL IndyCar Series ==
Year	Team	Chassis	No.	Engine	1	2	3	Rank	Points	Ref
1996	DeLorto Motorsports	Lola T92	81	Buick	WDW; Wth	PHX	INDY	-	0	
