= Stan Wattles =

American racing driver (born 1961)

Stan Wattles (born July 24, 1961, in Glen Cove, New York) is a former driver in the Indy Racing League. He raced in the 1996–2001 seasons with nineteen career starts, including the Indianapolis 500 in 1998–2000. He placed eighth in two races, and led his two laps in his first, in 1996 at Walt Disney World Speedway, but never led in his other contests.

In the 1999 VisionAire 500K at Lowe's Motor Speedway, Wattles was involved in a crash that killed three spectators when debris from his car cleared the fence, and eighteen laps later, the race was cancelled.

== Racing record ==
=== SCCA National Championship Runoffs ===
Year	Track	Car	Engine	Class	Finish	Start	Status
1988	Road Atlanta	Swift DB4	Toyota	Formula Atlantic	3	3	Running
1994	Mid-Ohio	Ralt RT40	Toyota	Formula Atlantic	1	1	Running

=== American Open Wheel ===
(key)

==== IndyCar ====
Year	Team	1	2	3	4	5	6	7	8	9	10	11	12	13	Rank	Points	Ref
1996	Leigh Miller Racing	WDW; 13	PHX; Wth	INDY											25th	44	
1996-97	McCormack Motorsports	NHM; 16	LVS; 18	WDW	PHX	INDY	TXS	PPIR	CLT	NH2					31st	63	
1996-97	Metro Racing Systems										LV2; 8				31st	63	
1998	Metro Racing Systems	WDW; 22	PHX; DNQ	INDY; 28	TXS; 10	NHM; 17	DOV	CLT	PPIR; Wth	ATL; 26	TX2; 8	LVS; 13			25th	88	
1999	Metro Racing	WDW; 24	PHX	CLT; C	INDY; 17	TXS	PPIR	ATL	DOV	PPI2	LVS	TX2			35th	19	
2000	Hemelgarn Racing	WDW	PHX	LVS	INDY; 23	TXS	PPIR	ATL	KTY	TX2					43rd	7	
2001	Hemelgarn Racing	PHX; 16	HMS; 26	ATL; 12	INDY; DNQ	TXS	PPI	RIR	KAN	NSH	KTY	STL	CHI	TX2	32nd	36	

==== Indy 500 results ====
Year	Chassis	Engine	Start	Finish
1998	Riley & Scott	Oldsmobile	29th	28th
1999	Dallara	Oldsmobile	20th	17th
2000	Dallara	Oldsmobile	8th	23rd
2001	Dallara	Oldsmobile	Qualifying Crash	
