= Leigh Miller Racing =

American sportscar racing team

Leigh Miller Racing was a team in the Indy Racing League and the IMSA GT Championship created by sportscar driver Leigh Miller in 1994. After competing at the IMSA Supercar Championship in 1993, Miller stepped up to IMSA GT, first with a Porsche 968 and a Porsche 944 Turbo for the GTU, before acquiring two Mazda-developed Kudzu prototypes for the WSC class and setting up his own team.

With Paul Debban as his regular teammate, Miller finished 18th in the WSC standings for 1994, with a sixth place at Laguna Seca as his best result. In 1995, the season started strong with a 5th-place finish in the WSC class at Daytona, further top 10 finishes at Sebring and Road Atlanta and another top-5 at Halifax with a variety of drivers, but Miller stopped competing after a crash at Watkins Glen. Despite this, he finished ninth in the championship standings. Jim Pace and Cort Wagner would drive for the team for most of the season.

For 1996, Miller purchased two 1994 Lola-Ford Cosworth chassis from Dick Simon Racing in order to compete in the newly created Indy Racing League with Stan Wattles, who was part of the team at the Halifax race in 1995. Being present at official testing from the second day onwards, Leigh Miller Racing completed an extensive testing program during the winter.

In the inaugural round at Walt Disney World, Wattles qualified in eighth place and run as high as fourth until he spun on cold tires after his last pit stop, crashing into the inside wall. During practice for the second round at Phoenix, Wattles suffered a serious crash, sustaining a brain hematoma and damage in his optical nerves. Wattles was ruled him out for the event, and missed the Indianapolis 500 due to his injuries.

Before the team could set up plans for a replacement driver, Beck Motorsports reached them, looking for a new chassis after ending their partnership with Zunne Group Racing. Beck acquired the two Lolas and the rights for the locked-in entry for the Indianapolis 500, but they never used those rights despite fielding a second driver, Hideshi Matsuda, that qualified as an at-large entry. Miller quietly retired from motorsports after Beck's buyout, and Wattles signed with McCormack Motorsports when he was fully recovered.

== IRL Race Results ==
(key) (Results in bold indicate pole position; results in italics indicate fastest lap)

Year	Chassis	Engine	Drivers	No.	1	2	3
1996					WDW	PHX	INDY
1996	Lola T94	Ford Cosworth	(United States) Stan Wattles	17	13	Wth	
