= Butch Brickell =

American racing driver

William "Butch" Brickell (April 18, 1957 – October 13, 2003) was an American racing driver and stuntman from Miami, Florida. He was the great-grandson of Miami co-founder William Brickell.

== Racing career ==
As a racer, Brickell participated in the 24 Hours of Daytona, 12 Hours of Sebring and other sports car races numerous times. In 1996 he attempted to make his move into the new Indy Racing League but fractured his neck in practice prior to the first race at the 1996 Indy 200 at Walt Disney World. He attempted to recover from his injuries in order to return to the cockpit, but was not cleared to drive at either Phoenix or for the Indianapolis 500. Brickell placed Tyce Carlson in his car to attempt to make the Indy 500, but Carlson's speed was the slowest accepted qualifying attempt and he was the first car bumped from the field. Brickell eventually did recover and he returned to sports car racing where he was active until the early 2000s.

== Stunt career ==
Brickell got his start performing Hollywood stunts in 1993, first working in the Mr. Nanny and The Specialist. He later worked in such notable films as 2 Fast 2 Furious, True Lies and Bad Boys.

Brickell died in 2003 at the age of 46 from an undisclosed illness.
