= 1996 Indy 200 at Walt Disney World =

(United States) 1996 Walt Disney World
Race details
- 1st round of the 1996 Indy Racing League season
- Date: January 27, 1996
- Official name: Indy 200 at Walt Disney World
- Location: Walt Disney World Speedway
- Course: Permanent racing facility 1.000 mi / 1.609 km
- Distance: 200 laps 200.000 mi / 321.869 km
- Weather: Dry with temperatures reaching up to 80.1 °F (26.7 °C); wind speeds reaching up to 13 miles per hour (21 km/h)

Pole position
- Driver: (United States) Buddy Lazier (Hemelgarn Racing)
- Time: 19.847

Fastest lap
- Driver: (United States) Buzz Calkins (Bradley Motorsports)
- Time: 20.954 (on lap 188 of 200)

Podium
- First: (United States) Buzz Calkins (Bradley Motorsports)
- Second: (United States) Tony Stewart (Team Menard)
- Third: (United States) Robbie Buhl (Beck Motorsports/Zunne Group)

The 1996 Indy 200 at Walt Disney World was the first round of the 1996 Indy Racing League, and the inaugural event for the Indy Racing League, who initiated the American open-wheel split that would last for 12 years. The race was held on January 27, 1996, at the 1.000 mi (1.609 km) Walt Disney World Speedway in Bay Lake, Florida. The race was won by a rookie driver, Buzz Calkins, after leading 130 laps. Future Indy Racing League and NASCAR champion Tony Stewart also made his Indy car debut, finishing second after a late-race duel with Calkins.

== Pre-Race News ==
The first event for the breakaway Indy Racing League took place at Walt Disney World Speedway, a brand new venue inaugurated on November 28, 1995. Testing began immediately with tire sessions held by Firestone and Goodyear, followed by an open test on December 4–8, with 16 drivers testing at some point. 13 of them were included in a tentative entry list published on December 6, highlighted by 1990 Indianapolis 500 winner Arie Luyendyk, IMS track record holder Roberto Guerrero, 1995 Indianapolis 500 pole sitter Scott Brayton and two full-time drivers from that year's IndyCar World Series season, Eddie Cheever and Eliseo Salazar. The veterans were joined by a handful of rookie drivers headlined by former Formula 1 race winner Michele Alboreto and Formula Atlantic champion Richie Hearn. All IndyCar teams refused to get involved in the IRL, and none of the top-16 drivers in the standings from the two previous IndyCar seasons were entered. Five other car-driver combinations entered for the opening round did not feature in testing during the month: Johnny O'Connell, Johnny Parsons and American Indycar drivers Rick DeLorto, Jim Buick and Tony Turco, who were joining fellow AIS competitors Butch Brickell and Bill Tempero.

During the Firestone tire session, Buddy Lazier tested a Hemelgarn Racing car and set the fastest time of the week at 182.621 mph, with Hearn, Buzz Calkins and Salazar posting laps over 181 mph in the following days. John Paul Jr. shook down the Brickell Racing car for a couple dozen laps, and World of Outlaws multi-champion Steve Kinser had a trial with A. J. Foyt Racing during the Goodyear tire session, with a best lap of 168 mph that fell 5 mph short of Foyt's main driver Davey Hamilton. Kinser aimed to reach a deal for an IRL ride alongside Hamilton, but the chance never materialized. Further testing followed from January 9–19, with 18 drivers taking part at some point. Both Hearn and Guerrero were absent from testing, and five new signings being made during the week: Lazier, Paul Jr., Scott Sharp, Robbie Buhl and Lyn St. James. The newly signed Lazier remained comfortably on top of the field with a fastest lap of 185.089 mph, just days after clocking a 184.900 mph lap during a private test at Phoenix International Raceway. Brayton, Cheever, Salazar and Luyendyk also practiced over 181 mph. PDM Racing lacked an engine for his car, which left Paul Jr. unable to test; they eventually gained use of a Buick-powered back-up car from Team Menard to race at Orlando.

On January 13, Butch Brickell broke two vertebrae in a hard crash at Turn 1, and was ruled out for the race, although he remained entered on an updated entry list, which reflected the withdrawal of Turco's entry because of sponsorship issues. Parsons had only completed six warm-up laps when a crash wiped his car out of testing, while O'Connell was only able to make his 64-lap debut on an Indy car at the last day of testing. That same day, Tony Stewart drove one of Team Menard's cars, and was announced later that day as their third driver for the season. John Menard wanted to field Jim Crawford in the third car at Orlando, but he was persuaded by Cary Agajanian, USAC's vicepresident for the IRL and Stewart's legal advisor, to give the 24-year old rookie a try. Being the first driver to have conquered the USAC Triple Crown, Stewart logged a best lap of 172 mph in only his second ever Indy car test, despite unknowingly running with a much-lowered turbo boost and a chassis that had been discarded by Cheever and Brayton for handling reasons. Stewart had been previously tapped by A. J. Foyt to drive for his team after a successful test at Phoenix in October 1995, but Foyt required him to step down from his handshake agreement to run a part-time NASCAR Busch Series schedule with Ranier-Walsh Racing, and Stewart declined the offer.

Out of the track, animosities between the IRL and the IndyCar World Series (CART) had been fueled by the 25/8 Rule, perceived by CART teams as a measure to lock them out of the Indianapolis 500. Tensions further escalated on December 19, when CART announced the creation of the U. S. 500, an event at Michigan International Speedway that would be held on Memorial Day, in direct opposition to the Indianapolis 500, and on January 11, when A. J. Foyt filed a $5 million suit against CART for anti-competitive practices. On 4 January, Oldsmobile was announced as the first engine supplier of the 4.0 V8 engine formula that the IRL was set to use from 1997. Five days later, Andy Evans bought the remaining share of Dick Simon in Scandia/Simon Racing, which would still compete under that name at Walt Disney World. This ownership change left A. J. Foyt as the only full-time team owner from the 1995 season to compete at Orlando.

== Practice & Qualifying Report ==
On Wednesday, January 24, Tempero/Giuffre Racing entered David Kudrave in a second car, before rookie orientation began. Also, A. J. Foyt Enterprises entered Mike Groff on Thursday before the start of practice, in a third car that would be run during the season by the Sinden Racing Services rental crew. Richie Hearn led the first day of practice with a 181.827 mph lap, with Buddy Lazier in close pursuit. They would be the only drivers to dip into the 180 mph mark during the weekend, with Roberto Guerrero in third at just 179.292 mph. With three drivers from American Indycar still entered, IRL officials did not clear any of them to keep competing: Bill Tempero, whose best lap was a 152.207 mph, and Rick DeLorto, clearly off the pace at just 107.223 mph after 30 laps, failed to complete their driver's tests, while the car of the attending Jim Buick never appeared on pit road.

On Friday morning practice, Eliseo Salazar clipped the wall at the exit of Turn 3 and lost control of the car, crashing first into the front-straight inside wall, and then right side into the Turn 1 outside wall. In the second impact, a stabilizing rod went through his cockpit, penetrating his right leg. Salazar was rushed by helicopter to Orlando Regional Medical Center, where he underwent surgeries for a fractured femur and thigh injuries, being listed afterwards in stable condition. Lazier led the session with a lap at 181.800 mph, followed by Hearn and Arie Luyendyk.

Lazier, who had not placed higher than 16th in his 55 previous Indy car starts, qualified on pole with a best lap of 181.388 mph. Hearn fell just short of the 181 mph mark, settling for second on his first Indy car qualifying session. Seasoned veterans Guerrero and Luyendyk qualified third and fourth, the latter using a back-up car that would be later renumbered, in front of Scott Sharp and five further rookies. As expected by the nuances of their stock block engine, Team Menard struggled in qualifying, although Tony Stewart surprised by outqualifying his more established teammates, Eddie Cheever and Scott Brayton, despite having only completed 67 laps in winter testing.

John Paul Jr. had the only incident of the session after brushing the wall in Turn 2, completing only one timed lap at 160 mph. Unlike Stewart and Groff, who were running on competitive race cars, other drivers at the bottom of the field mirrored Paul Jr.'s issues that stemmed from the lack of mileage: Johnny O'Connell had only passed his driver test during the morning practice; Johnny Parsons, without any laps at speed during winter testing, barely went over 153 mph, and David Kudrave, with no testing mileage whatsoever, put his car on the grid at just 146.353 mph, a 35 mph, 4.5 second deficit over Lazier's time. On race day, he would be black flagged after just four laps.

On Friday afternoon practice, held after qualifying, Eddie Cheever and Richie Hearn collided and crashed at Turn 1, when Cheever went low and into Hearn's path. Both drivers were unhurt, but their chassis were damaged beyond repair, and had to race with spare cars. They were allowed to start at the back of the field, after taking part in a 15-minute special warm-up session. Della Penna didn't have a competitive spare car, and reached a deal with Pagan Racing to use Roberto Guerrero's back-up unit. The Colombian was now due to start on the front row because of Hearn's demotion, which left Buzz Calkins as the best placed rookie in the 5th spot. Like Lazier, Scott Sharp had a much improved career-best placing in the 2nd row, having never started higher than 13th.

=== Qualifying Results ===
Pos	No.	Name	Lap 1	Lap 2	Best (in mph)
1	91	(United States) Buddy Lazier	20.011	19.847	181.388
2	21	(Colombia) Roberto Guerrero	20.516	20.210	178.130
3	35	(Netherlands) Arie Luyendyk	20.810	20.305	177.296
4	41	(United States) Scott Sharp	20.524	20.430	176.211
5	12	(United States) Buzz Calkins R	20.517	20.751	175.464
6	14	(United States) Davey Hamilton R	21.072	20.537	175.293
7	20	(United States) Tony Stewart R	20.891	20.624	174.554
8	17	(United States) Stan Wattles R	21.118	20.752	173.477
9	9	(France) Stéphan Grégoire R	20.994	20.780	173.244
10	2	(United States) Scott Brayton	20.863	20.787	173.185
11	90	(United States) Lyn St. James	21.186	21.039	171.111
12	11	(United States) Mike Groff	21.209	21.095	170.657
13	54	(United States) Robbie Buhl	21.535	21.107	170.560
14	33	(Italy) Michele Alboreto R	21.360	21.121	170.446
15	75	(United States) Johnny O'Connell R	21.695	21.462	167.738
16	18	(United States) John Paul Jr.	Waved off	22.466	160.242
17	16	(United States) Johnny Parsons	23.832	23.451	153.512
18	25	(United States) David Kudrave	25.325	24.598	146.353
19	4	(United States) Richie Hearn^{1} R	20.062	19.900	180.905
20	3	(United States) Eddie Cheever^{1}	20.703	20.812	173.888

1. Changed to a backup car for the race, following a crash in a practice session after qualifying.

Key	Meaning
R	Rookie
W	Past winner

==== Failed to qualify or withdrew ====
- (Chile) Eliseo Salazar - for Scandia/Simon Racing
- (United States) Rick DeLorto R - for DeLorto Motorsports
- (United States) Bill Tempero - for Tempero/Giuffre Racing

== Race Report ==
Packed grandstands, with a published gate of 50,742 spectators, witnessed the grand opening of the Indy Racing League on Saturday. The start lacked a proper alignment, as only the first two rows and a few other drivers in the back were loosely side by side when Lazier started to accelerate entering Turn 4, and the majority saw the green flag in single file. Roberto Guerrero was caught off-guard by Lazier's getaway, and Arie Luyendyk passed him for second place entering Turn 1. On Lap 10, Tony Stewart completed his first overtake on Davey Hamilton for sixth, and had worked his way up to third when the first caution came out on Lap 18. Richie Hearn had already gained 12 positions and was running in 7th place when a sway bar adjuster broke on his car, causing him to spin at the exit of Turn 1. Stewart passed Luyendyk at the restart on Lap 24 and grabbed the lead five laps later.

Lazier began to lose pace with a loose right front upright. Just after being passed by Luyendyk for second place on Lap 37, he headed to the pits, where he lost three laps as Hemelgarn's crew tried to sort out the issue. In a later pit stop, his team choose to take parts from Stéphan Grégoire's car, which had been retired from ninth place with gearbox issues in his pit stop. However, handling issues persisted, and Lazier dropped out before the halfway point. Around Lap 30, Buzz Calkins began mounting a charge towards the front, passing Scott Sharp on Lap 32, Guerrero on Lap 35 and Luyendyk on Lap 51. After the first round of pit stops, heavy traffic allowed Calkins to catch up to Stewart by Lap 55, and he took the lead on the 66th lap, just before the second round of pit stops.

While heading to the pits, Luyendyk ran out of fuel, and his car stalled while exiting the pit box, needing a push start. Calkins had a fast second pit stop, two laps after Stewart's, and was able to open a huge gap through traffic and a solid pace: on Lap 84, only Stewart (15.3 seconds behind) and Guerrero (17.2 seconds) were still on the lead lap. By the halfway mark, a cautious Stewart was 21 seconds behind Calkins, before the Menard driver bounced back in order to stay on the lead lap, within 15 seconds of the leader. Luyendyk began to regain ground, steadily climbing up to 7th place on Lap 127. However, his gearbox had been compromised after the pit issues, and the Byrd/Leberle-Treadway driver lost all gears during his third stop, forcing him to retire.

Rookie Stan Wattles was running in fourth place, having stayed largely out of trouble after passing Davey Hamilton on Lap 35. Shortly after a pit stop, on Lap 147, he spun on Turn 2 and hit the inside wall, which was labelled by him as "a rookie mistake". The ensuing caution allowed Stewart to cut back the gap with Calkins. Robbie Buhl had gone longer on his third stint and was able to pit under yellow, going from eighth to third place over Michele Alboreto, Roberto Guerrero, who suffered a brief stall in his pit stop, and Hamilton. Further back, Eddie Cheever had worked his way up to ninth place, his progress having been hampered by the same handling issues that had forced his teammate Scott Brayton to retire from the race. With lapped cars in between, Calkins opened a small gap of 3 seconds over Stewart after the restart.

On Lap 178, Davey Hamilton had a sudden mechanical failure on Turn 2 and crashed out of sixth place. The race restarted on Lap 184, and Cheever, who had passed Johnny O'Connell 20 laps before, took seventh place over Scott Sharp. When Sharp tried to retake the position on Lap 189, both drivers collided, in a crash that resembled the one Cheever and Hearn had the day before, this time with Cheever being on the outside of Turn 1. Calkins made it safely through the scene, but Stewart encountered the recovery vehicles on his path, and had to swerve abruptly to the outside to avoid them. He brushed the wall at low speed and run over some debris, which caused a sliced tire and a bent front wing, but both issues went largely unnoticed and Stewart kept on running. When the race was restarted with six laps to go, Stewart began hounding Calkins for the lead, but he lost some ground shortly after because of the damages to the car. A late charge was not enough to strip the win away from Buzz Calkins, who took the checkered flag by eight tenths of a second.

With his win, Calkins became the first American driver (and the only one to date) to win his first Indy car race, in a feat only equalled in modern Indy car racing by Formula 1 world champions Graham Hill at the 1966 Indianapolis 500 and Nigel Mansell at the 1993 Australian FAI IndyCar Grand Prix, per IndyCar's record book. Calkins had also won his first Indy car oval race, being the second of four drivers to ever achieve this feat along Hill, Scott Dixon and Sébastien Bourdais. This would also be the only win for Calkins in his 6-year Indy car career. As most of the drivers were rookies or had an unheralded career in IndyCar, most of them achieved personal milestones. Tony Stewart settled for second in his first rear-engine open wheel race, and Robbie Buhl also scored his first Indy car podium, improving on his sixth place at the 1993 Toyota Grand Prix of Long Beach. Mike Groff equalled the sixth place obtained at the 1994 Valvoline 200 at Phoenix, while Lyn St. James scored her only top-10 result in Indy car competition, with an 8th-place finish.

== Race results ==
=== Box Score ===
Pos	No.	Driver	Team	Chassis	Engine	Tyre	Laps	Time/Retired	Grid	Laps Led	Points
1	12	(United States) Buzz Calkins R	Bradley Motorsports	Reynard 95I	Ford Cosworth XB	F	200	1:33:30.748	5	130	35
2	20	(United States) Tony Stewart R	Team Menard	Lola T95/00	Menard Indy V-6	G	200	+ 0.886	7	37	33
3	54	(United States) Robbie Buhl	Beck Motorsports/Zunne Group	Lola T94/00	Ford Cosworth XB	F	198	+ 2 laps	13	1	32
4	33	(Italy) Michele Alboreto R	Scandia/Simon Racing	Lola T95/00	Ford Cosworth XB	G	198	+ 2 laps	14	0	31
5	21	(Colombia) Roberto Guerrero	Pagan Racing	Reynard 94I	Ford Cosworth XB	G	197	+ 3 laps	2	0	30
6	11	(United States) Mike Groff	A. J. Foyt Enterprises	Lola T95/00	Ford Cosworth XB	G	195	+ 5 laps	12	0	29
7	75	(United States) Johnny O'Connell R	Cunningham Racing	Reynard 95I	Ford Cosworth XB	F	195	+ 5 laps	15	0	28
8	90	(United States) Lyn St. James	Scandia/Simon Racing	Lola T94/00	Ford Cosworth XB	G	192	+ 8 laps	11	0	27
9	18	(United States) John Paul Jr.	PDM/Automatic Sprinkler System	Lola T93/00	Menard Indy V-6	G	190	+ 10 laps	16	0	26
10	3	(United States) Eddie Cheever	Team Menard	Lola T95/00	Menard Indy V-6	G	184	Accident	20	0	25
11	41	(United States) Scott Sharp	A. J. Foyt Enterprises	Lola T95/00	Ford Cosworth XB	G	184	Accident	4	0	24
12	14	(United States) Davey Hamilton R	A. J. Foyt Enterprises	Lola T95/00	Ford Cosworth XB	G	173	Accident	6	2	23
13	17	(United States) Stan Wattles R	Leigh Miller Racing	Lola T94/00	Ford Cosworth XB	F	144	Accident	8	2	22
14	5	(Netherlands) Arie Luyendyk	Byrd/Leberle-Treadway Racing	Reynard 95I	Ford Cosworth XB	G	132	Gearbox	3	0	21
15	2	(United States) Scott Brayton	Team Menard	Lola T95/00	Menard Indy V-6	G	105	Handling	10	0	20
16	9	(France) Stéphan Grégoire R	Hemelgarn Racing	Reynard 95I	Ford Cosworth XB	F	69	Gearbox	9	0	19
17	91	(United States) Buddy Lazier	Hemelgarn Racing	Reynard 95I	Ford Cosworth XB	F	61	Brakes	1	28	18
18	16	(United States) Johnny Parsons	Blueprint Racing	Lola T93/00	Menard Indy V-6	F	45	Suspension	17	0	17
19	4	(United States) Richie Hearn R	Della Penna Motorsports	Reynard 95I	Ford Cosworth XB	G	17	Accident	19	0	16
20	25	(United States) David Kudrave	Tempero/Giuffre Racing	Lola T93/00	Buick Indy V-6	G	4	Transmission	18	0	15

=== Race Statistics ===
- Average Speed: 128.325 mph (206.519 km/h)
- Lead changes: 6 among 6 drivers

Lap Leaders
From Lap	To Lap	Total Laps	Leader
1	28	28	Buddy Lazier
29	65	37	Tony Stewart
66	70	5	Buzz Calkins
71	72	2	Stan Wattles
73	73	1	Robbie Buhl
74	75	2	Davey Hamilton
76	200	125	Buzz Calkins

Cautions: 4 for 21 laps
From Lap	To Lap	Total Laps	Reason
18	23	6	#4 (Hearn) crash
147	150	4	#17 (Wattles) crash
178	183	6	#14 (Hamilton) crash
189	193	5	#41 (Sharp) and #3 (Cheever) crash

== Standings after the race ==
Drivers' Championship standings

Pos	Driver	Points
1	(United States) Buzz Calkins	35
2	(United States) Tony Stewart	33
3	(United States) Robbie Buhl	32
4	(Italy) Michele Alboreto	31
5	(Colombia) Roberto Guerrero	30

- Note: Only the top five positions are included for the standings.

== Broadcasting ==
The first race as part of the Indy Racing League was carried live on the IMS Radio Network. Bob Jenkins served as chief announcer. In the booth with Jenkins were Gary Lee as well as Donald Davidson.

Mike King and newcomer Vince Welch were the pit reporters.

Indianapolis Motor Speedway Radio Network
Booth Announcers	Pit/garage reporters
Chief Announcer: Bob Jenkins; Statistician/Commentary: Gary Lee; Historian/Commentary: Donald Davidson	Mike King; Vince Welch

=== Television ===
The race was carried live flag-to-flag coverage in the United States on ABC Sports.

Paul Page served as host and play-by-play announcer. Bobby Unser and Danny Sullivan served as color commentators.

ABC Television
Booth Announcers	Pit/garage reporters
Host/Announcer: Paul Page; Color: Danny Sullivan; Color: Bobby Unser	Jack Arute; Gary Gerould
