= 1988 Barber Saab Pro Series =

1988 Barber Saab Pro Series season

Seasons
- ← 1987 1989 →

The 1988 Barber Saab Pro Series season was the third season of the series. All drivers used Saab powered Mondiale chassis. BFGoodrich radial tyres were replaced by Goodyear Eagle slicks. Bruce Feldman won the championship.

== Race calendar and results ==
Round	Circuit	Location	Date	Winner
1	Bicentennial Park	(United States) Miami, Florida	February 28	(Colombia) John Estupiñán
2	Road Atlanta	(United States) Braselton, Georgia	April 10	(Norway) Harald Huysman
3	Palm Beach International Raceway	(United States) Jupiter, Florida	April 24	(United States) Bruce Feldman
4	Lime Rock Park	(United States) Lime Rock, Connecticut	May 30	(United States) Tom Dolan
5	Mid-Ohio Sports Car Course	(United States) Lexington, Ohio	June 5	(Canada) Jeremy Dale
6	Watkins Glen International	(United States) Watkins Glen, New York	July 3	(United States) Bruce Feldman
7	Road America	(United States) Elkhart Lake, Wisconsin	July 17	(New Zealand) Rob Wilson
8	Portland International Raceway	(United States) Portland, Oregon	July 31	(Norway) Harald Huysman
9	Sears Point Raceway	(United States) Sonoma, California	August 13	(Norway) Harald Huysman
10	HemisFair Park	(United States) San Antonio, Texas	September 4	(Canada) Jeremy Dale
11	Del Mar Fairgrounds	(United States) Del Mar, California	October 22	(Canada) Jeremy Dale
12	Tamiami Park	(United States) University Park, Florida	November 1	(New Zealand) Rob Wilson

== Final standings ==
Rank	Driver	(United States) MIA	(United States) RAT	(United States) WPB	(United States) LRP	(United States) MOH	(United States) WGI	(United States) ROA	(United States) POR	(United States) SON	(United States) SAN	(United States) DM	(United States) TAM	Points
1	(United States) Bruce Feldman	3	6	1	4	2	1	6	6	5			3	115
2	(United States) John Cochran	6	5		2	5	4	2	8	6	2	3	2	110
3	(Norway) Harald Huysman		1		6	4		7	1	1		2	4	105
4	(Canada) Jeremy Dale				3	1		4			1	1	6	88
5	(New Zealand) Rob Wilson					3	5	1	7	2		5	1	87
6	(United States) Mark Jaremko	4	4	2				5	2	8				61
7	(Colombia) John Estupiñán	1	2	3	5	10		8	10					60
8	(United States) Tom Dolan	8			1	6			3	4				51
9	(United States) Brian Bonner			6			2				4	9		33
10	(Italy) Giuseppe Cipriani	2	7				3							31
11	(United States) Ken Knott	22			8	8	7	3				6		28
12	(United States) Andy Swett	26	3			7		9	4					28
13	(United States) Jim Pace					9				7	3		5	26
14	(United States) Stephen Hynes	21	9	4	10		8			9	9	10		21
15	(United States) Todd Snyder	5								3				20
16	(United States) Mike Strawbridge	17							9	10	5	8	9	16
17	(United States) Randy Harris	9	10	9					5					13
18	(United States) Freddie Spencer											4		10
18	(United States) Richard Burgess				7		6							10
20	(United States) Wayne Cerbo			5										8
21	(United States) Terry Marshall	28									6		10	7
22	(United States) Bob Dotson	31					9				8			5
23	(United States) Carlos Ehlke	7												4
23	(United States) George Sutcliffe	27		7										4
23	(United Kingdom) Justin Bell	14											7	4
23	(United States) Nick Kunewalder	30										7		4
23	(United States) Scott Anderson										7			4
28	(United States) George Straub		8											3
28	(United States) Robbie Buhl	29											8	3
28	(United States) Tom McCabe	11		8										3
31	(United States) Tony Shepley				9									2
32	(United States) Darryl Landvater						10							1
32	(United States) Dave Martin							10						1
32	(Belgium) Patrick Dewulf	10												1
32	(United States) Richard McGinley			10										1
32	(United States) Tray White										10			1
	(United States) Tim Beverly	15												
	Berry Bibby	13												
	(United States) Brian Bonner	20												
	(United States) Fernando Capablanca	18												
	(United Kingdom) John Finch	16												
	(United States) Nick Comlyn	24												
	(United States) Joe Pezza	12												
	(United States) Luis Scarpin	25												
	(United States) John Schneider	23												
	(United States) P.K. White	19												
