= Kelly Collins =

American racing driver (born 1965)

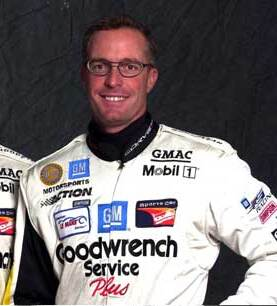
- Collins in 2000
- Nationality: (United States) American
- Born: April 21, 1965 (age 61) Sun Valley, Idaho, U.S.

Championship titles
- 2008: Rolex Sports Car Series – GT

Kelly Joseph Collins (born April 21, 1965) is an American racing driver. He was a Corvette Racing factory driver from 2000 to 2003, winning in the American Le Mans Series and taking four podiums in a row at the 24 Hours of Le Mans. He was later crowned Grand-Am champion in the GT class for Pontiac in 2008.

== Career ==
Collins began his racing career in motocross at the age of seven, before switching to single-seaters in 1990, competing in the Barber Saab Pro Series. Following that, Collins primarily competed in the IMSA Firehawk Series for the next five years, while working full-time as an instructor for the Skip Barber Racing School. In 1996, while in line to get a hot dog and a beer at the 24 Hours of Daytona, Collins was approached by Jay Cochran, who gave him his seat in Alan Friedman's Porsche 911 Carrera RSR two hours into the race. On his IMSA GT debut, Collins drove 11 of the 24 hours and finished 17th overall and tenth in the GTS-2 class after the engine blew up with 20 minutes to go.

Racing part-time in the IMSA GT Championship for the next three seasons, Collins most notably won the 1998 Sebring Classic in the GTS-3 class, whilst also making sporadic appearances in the FIA GT Championship in 1997. In 1999, Collins began the year by winning the 24 Hours of Daytona for Porsche-fielding Alex Job Racing in GTS-3, before winning the 12 Hours of Sebring with them in the GT class. Seeing out the ALMS season in the GTS class, Collins mainly raced for fellow Porsche customer team Martin Snow Racing, taking a pair of podiums, as well as making his debut for Corvette Racing at Petit Le Mans alongside Andy Pilgrim and Scott Sharp.

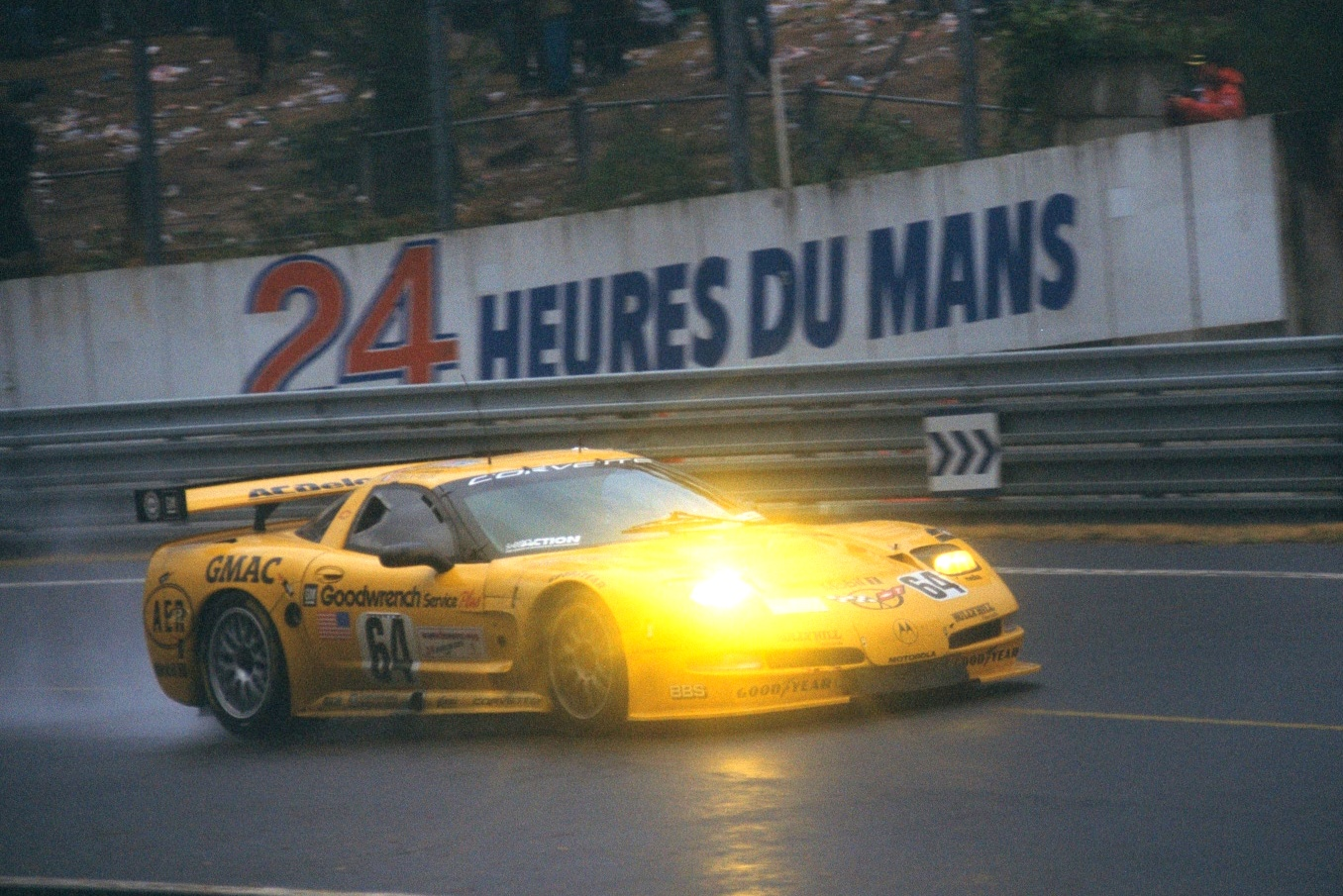
Collins was second in GTS at the 2001 24 Hours of Le Mans for Corvette Racing.

Joining the Corvette factory stable in 2000, Collins raced a Chevrolet Corvette C5-R on a part-time basis in ALMS, winning Petit Le Mans and placing third in the GTS class at the 24 Hours of Le Mans with Pilgrim and Franck Fréon. Remaining with the Corvette squad for 2001 for an expanded program, Collins began the year by finishing second in GTS at the 24 Hours of Daytona alongside Pilgrim, Dale Earnhardt and Dale Earnhardt Jr. Returning to ALMS for the rest of the year for a near full-time campaign, Collins won Petit Le Mans and took five other podiums to end the season fifth in the GTS standings. During 2001, Collins also returned to the 24 Hours of Le Mans, finishing second in the GTS class with Pilgrim and Fréon.

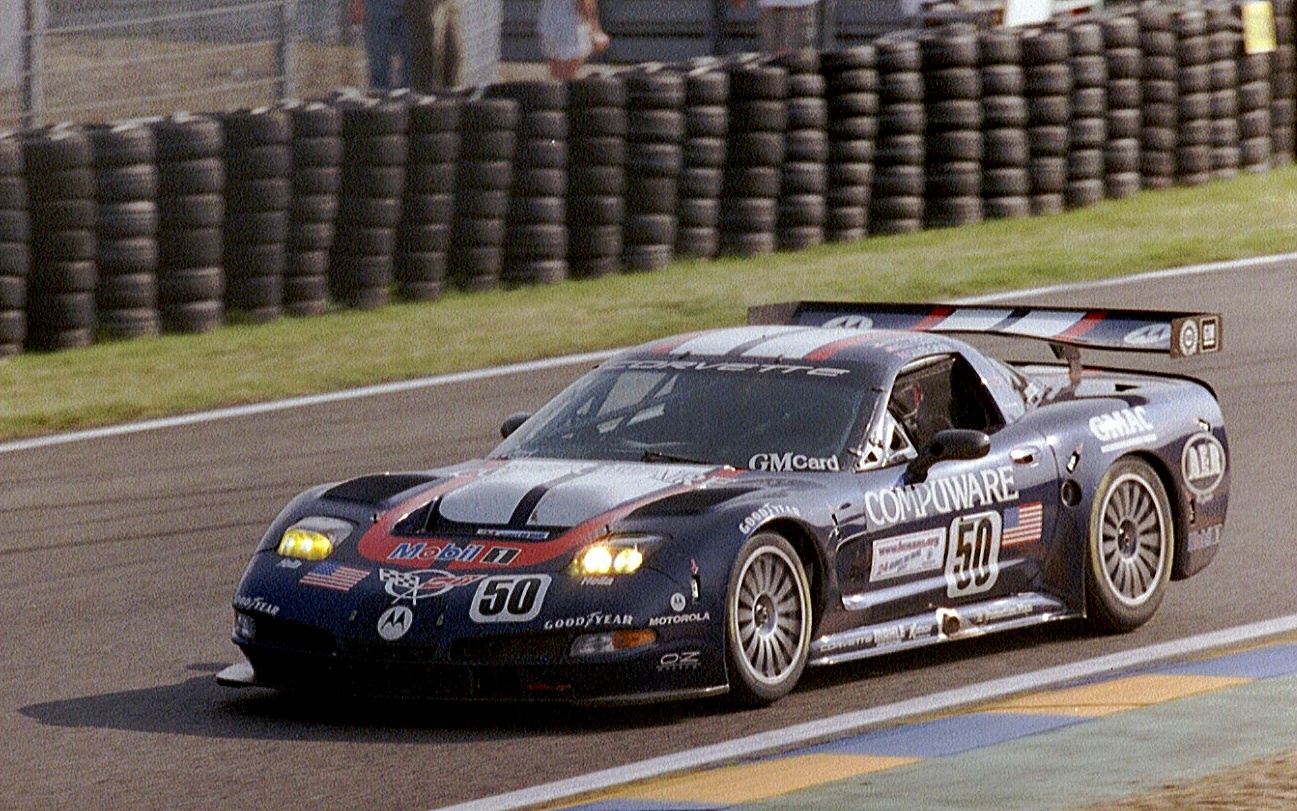
Collins' blue Chevrolet Corvette C5-R at the 24 Hours of Le Mans in 2003.

Continuing in ALMS for 2002, now on a full-time basis, Collins together with Andy Pilgrim won the Road America 500 and the Grand Prix de Trois-Rivières, as well as taking seven other podiums in the ten-race season en route to a third-place points finish. During 2002, Collins, Pilgrim and Fréon also took their third consecutive class podium at the 24 Hours of Le Mans, finishing second in GTS. In the 2003 American Le Mans Series, Collins partnered Oliver Gavin to win the Grand Prix of Atlanta and the Grand Prix de Trois-Rivières, taking fourth in the GTS points with four other podiums to his name. Collins also raced at the 24 Hours of Le Mans during the year, finishing second with Gavin and Pilgrim in GTS.

Exiting Corvette and switching to the Rolex Sports Car Series in 2004, Collins mainly competed in the DP class, in which he took two podiums for G&W Motorsports. He returned to the GT class towards the end of the season, winning at Fontana for BMW-fielding Prototype Technology Group and making two ALMS starts for Panoz Motor Sports. Remaining with PTG for his maiden full season in Grand-Am in 2005, Collins scored a lone win at Mid-Ohio and two other podiums to end the year 14th in the GT standings. Collins then joined The Racer's Group for the 2006 season, sharing their Pontiac GTO.R with Paul Edwards. In his only full season with the team, Collins won in Mexico, Homestead–Miami and Phoenix en route to a third-place points finish.

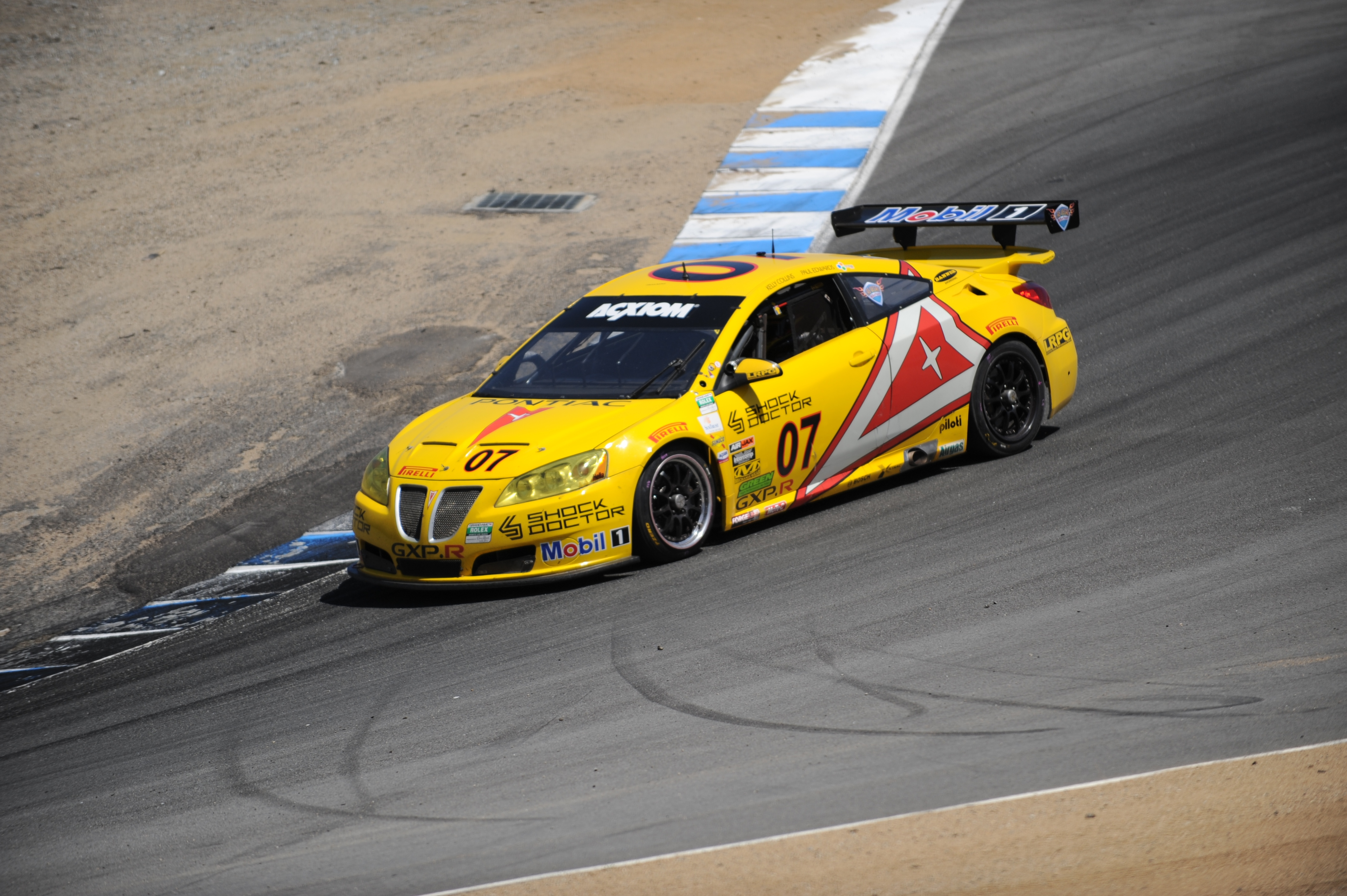
Collins driving down the Laguna Seca corkscrew in his Pontiac GXP.R in 2009.

Remaining with Pontiac machinery for 2007, Collins and Edwards switched to Banner Racing, taking wins at Barber and Utah to end the year runner-up in the GT points. In 2008, the pair began the season by winning at Homestead–Miami, Phoenix and Lime Rock, before ending the season with a win in Utah to seal the GT title. Continuing with Banner Racing for 2009, Collins and Edwards scored a lone win at the Homestead–Miami finale, as well as six other podiums to end the year runner-up in points. After a quiet campaign the following year, headlined by finishing third at the 24 Hours of Daytona for TRG, Collins made select appearances in the 2011 Pirelli World Challenge and the 2013 American Le Mans Series for Porsche-fielding TruSpeed Motorsports.

== Racing record ==
=== Career Summary ===
Season	Series	Team	Races	Wins	Poles	F/Laps	Podiums	Points	Position
1990	Barber Saab Pro Series		2	0	0	0	1	2	14th
1991	IMSA Firehawk Series								
1992	IMSA Firehawk Series								
1993	IMSA Firehawk Series			1					5th
1994	IMSA Firehawk Series			1					6th
1995	IMSA Firehawk Series			1					**3rd**
1996	IMSA GT Championship – GTS-2	Alan Friedman	1						
1996	IMSA GT Championship – GTS-2	Team A.R.E.	4				2		
1997	IMSA Speedvision Cup – Grand Sports	Royal Purple							
1997	IMSA GT Championship – GTS-3	Team A.R.E.	2				1		
1997	IMSA GT Championship – GTS-3	Jim Mathews Racing	1				1		
1997	IMSA GT Championship – GTS-2	Roock Racing	2	0	0	0	0		
1997	IMSA GT Championship – GTS-2	GMB Motorsports	2	0	0	0	2		
1997	IMSA GT Championship – GTS-2	Martin Snow	3	0	0	0	2		
1997	FIA GT Championship – GT2	Konrad Motorsport	1	0	0	0	0	0	NC
1997	FIA GT Championship – GT2	GMB Motorsport	1	0	0	0	0	0	NC
1998	United States Road Racing Championship – GT3	Technodyne	1						
1998	IMSA GT Championship – GT3	AASCO Performance	1						
1998	IMSA GT Championship – GT3	Alex Job Racing	5	1					
1999	United States Road Racing Championship – GTS-3	Alex Job Racing	1	1	0	0	1		
1999	American Le Mans Series – GT	Alex Job Racing	1	1	0	0	1	30	30th
1999	American Le Mans Series – GTS	Martin Snow Racing	6	0	0	0	2	116	5th
1999	American Le Mans Series – GTS	Corvette Racing	1	0	0	0	0	116	5th
2000	Grand American Road Racing Championship – GTO	Corvette Racing	1	0	0	0	0	31	45th
2000	Grand American Road Racing Championship – GTU	Genesis Racing	1	0	0	0	0	41	60th
2000	American Le Mans Series – GTS	Corvette Racing	3	1	0	0	1	67	14th
2000	24 Hours of Le Mans – GTS	Corvette Racing	1	0	0	0	1	—N/a	**3rd**
2001	Grand American Road Racing Championship – GTS	Corvette Racing	1	0	0	0	1	35	21st
2001	American Le Mans Series – GTS	Corvette Racing	8	1	0	0	6	153	5th
2001	24 Hours of Le Mans – GTS	Corvette Racing	1	0	0	0	1	—N/a	**2nd**
2002	American Le Mans Series – GTS	Corvette Racing	10	2	0	0	9	225	**3rd**
2002	24 Hours of Le Mans – GTS	Corvette Racing	1	0	0	0	1	—N/a	**2nd**
2003	American Le Mans Series – GTS	Corvette Racing	9	2	0	0	6	115	4th
2003	24 Hours of Le Mans – GTS	Corvette Racing	1	0	0	0	1	—N/a	**2nd**
2004	Rolex Sports Car Series – DP	Michael Shank Racing	1	0	0	0	0	157	21st
2004	Rolex Sports Car Series – DP	G&W Motorsports	5	0	0	0	2	157	21st
2004	Rolex Sports Car Series – DP	Doran Lista Racing	1	0	0	0	0	157	21st
2004	Grand Am Cup – GS	Performance Nissan						198	11th
2004	Rolex Sports Car Series – GT	Prototype Technology Group, Inc.	2	1	0	0	1	58	33rd
2004	American Le Mans Series – GT	The Racer's Group	1	0	0	0	0	9	27th
2004	American Le Mans Series – GT	Panoz Motor Sports	2	0	0	0	0	9	27th
2005	Rolex Sports Car Series – GT	Prototype Technology Group, Inc.	13	1	1	0	3	280	14th
2005	Grand Am Cup – GS	Synergy Racing						65	61st
2006	Rolex Sports Car Series – GT	The Racer's Group	13	3	0	0	8	451	**3rd**
2007	Rolex Sports Car Series – GT	Banner Racing	13	2	0	4	7	365	**2nd**
2008	Rolex Sports Car Series – GT	Banner Racing	13	4	0	1	6	373	**1st**
2009	Rolex Sports Car Series – GT	Banner Racing	12	1	0	1	7	334	**2nd**
2010	Rolex Sports Car Series – GT	The Racer's Group	1	0	0	0	1	144	23rd
2010	Rolex Sports Car Series – GT	LG Motorsports	7	0	0	0	0	144	23rd
2011	Pirelli World Challenge – GT	TruSpeed Motorsports	1	0	0	0	0	76	24th
2013	Rolex Sports Car Series – GT	TruSpeed Motorsports	2	0	0	0	0	35	47th

=== Complete American Le Mans Series results ===
(key) Races in bold indicates pole position. Races in italics indicates fastest lap.

Year	Team	Class	Make	Engine	1	2	3	4	5	6	7	8	9	10	11	12	Pos.	Points	Ref
1999	Alex Job Racing	GT	Porsche 911 Carrera RSR	Porsche 3.8 L Flat-6	SEB; 1												30th	30	
1999	Martin Snow Racing	GTS	Porsche 911 GT2	Porsche 3.6 L Turbo Flat-6		ATL; 2	MOS; 6	SON; 5	POR; 4		MON; 3	LSV; 7†					5th	116	
1999	Corvette Racing	GTS	Chevrolet Corvette C5-R	Chevrolet 6.0 L V8						PET; 4							5th	116	
2000	Corvette Racing	GTS	Chevrolet Corvette C5-R	Chevrolet 7.0 L V8	SEB; 5	CHA	SIL	NÜR	SON	MOS	TEX	ROS	PET; 1	MON; 4	LSV	ADE	14th	67	
2001	Corvette Racing	GTS	Chevrolet Corvette C5-R	Chevrolet 7.0 L V8	TEX; Ret	SEB; 2	DON	JAR	SON; 2	POR; DSQ	MOS; 2	MID; 2	MON; 3	PET; 1			5th	153	
2002	Corvette Racing	GTS	Chevrolet Corvette C5-R	Chevrolet 7.0 L V8	SEB; 4	SON; 2	MID; 2	ELK; 1	WAS; 2	TRO; 1	MOS; 2	MON; 3†	MIA; 2	PET; 3			3rd	225	
2003	Corvette Racing	GTS	Chevrolet Corvette C5-R	Chevrolet 7.0 L V8	SEB; 3†	ATL; 1	SON; 2	TRO; 1	MOS; Ret	ELK; 5	MON; 3	MIA; DNS	PET; 3				4th	115	
2004	The Racer's Group	GT	Porsche 911 GT3 RSR	Porsche 3.6 L Flat-6	SEB; 8	MID											27th	9	
2004	Panoz Motor Sports	GT	Panoz Esperante GT-LM	Ford (Elan) 5.0 L V8			LIM; Ret	SON	POR; Ret	MOS	ELK	PET	MON				27th	9	

^{†} Did not finish the race but was classified as his car completed more than 70% of the overall winner's race distance.

=== Complete Grand-Am Rolex Sports Car Series results ===
(key) (Races in bold indicate pole position; results in italics indicate fastest lap)

Year	Team	Class	Make	Engine	1	2	3	4	5	6	7	8	9	10	11	12	13	14	Rank	Points
2000	Corvette Racing	GTO	Chevrolet Corvette C5-R	Chevrolet LS1 7.0 L V8	DAY; 10	PHX	MIA	LIM	MOH	DAY	ELK	TRO							45th	31
2000	Genesis Racing	GTU	BMW M3 E36	BMW 3.2 L I6									WGL; 4						60th	41
2001	Corvette Racing	GTS	Chevrolet Corvette C5-R	Chevrolet LS1 7.0 L V8	DAY; 2	MIA	PHX	WGL	LIM	MOH	ELK	TRO	WGL	DAY					21st	35
2004	Michael Shank Racing	DP	Doran JE4	Lexus 4.3 L V8	DAY; 4														21st	157
2004	G&W Motorsports	DP	Doran JE4	BMW 4.9 L V8		MIA; 2	PHX; 3	MTT; 7	WGL; 12	DAY; WD	MOH; WD	WGL	MIA; WD	VIR; 15	BAR; WD				21st	157
2004	Doran Lista Racing	DP	Doran JE4	Lexus 4.3 L V8									MIA; 7						21st	157
2004	Prototype Technology Group	GT	BMW M3 E46	BMW 3.2 L I6										VIR; WD	BAR; 8	CAL; 1			33rd	58
2005	Prototype Technology Group, Inc.	GT	BMW M3 E46	BMW 3.2 L I6	DAY; 31	MIA; 19	CAL; 12	LAG; 2	MTT; 17	WGL; 11	DAY; 8	BAR; 6	WGL; 8	MOH; 1	PHX; 2	WGL; 5	VIR; 12	MEX	14th	280
2006	The Racer's Group	GT	Pontiac GTO.R	Pontiac 6.0L V8	DAY; 13	MEX; 1	MIA; 1	VIR; 2	LAG; 4	PHX; 1	LIM; 2	WGL; 3	MOH; 2	DAY; 16	BAR; 3	SON; 6	MIL; 8		3rd	451
2007	Banner Racing	GT	Pontiac GXP.R	Pontiac 6.0L V8	DAY; 2	MEX; 10	MIA; 7	VIR; 3	LAG; 4	LIM; 4	WGL; 3	MOH; 3	DAY; 2	IOW; 14	BAR; 1	CGV; 8	MIL; 1		2nd	365
2008	Banner Racing	GT	Pontiac GXP.R	Pontiac 6.0L V8	DAY; 7	MIA; 1	MEX; 2	VIR; 4	LAG; 1	LIM; 1	WGL; 3	MOH; 11	DAY; 4	BAR; 6	CGV; 7	NJMP; 9	MIL; 1		1st	373
2009	Banner Racing	GT	Pontiac GXP.R	Pontiac 6.0L V8	DAY; 4	VIR; 2	**NJMP**; 15	LAG; 2	WGL; 2	MOH; 3	DAY; 9	BAR; 3	WGL; 5	CGV; 10	MIL; 3	MIA; 1			2nd	334
2010	The Racer's Group	GT	Porsche 911 GT3 Cup	Porsche 3.6L F6	DAY; 3														23rd	144
2010	LG Motorsports	GT	Chevrolet Corvette C6	Chevrolet 5.7L V8		MIA; 10	BAR; 13	VIR; 17	LIM; 13	WGL; WD	MOH; WD	DAY; 11	NJMP; 18	WGL; 12	CGV	MIL			23rd	144
2013	TruSpeed Motorsports	GT	Porsche 911 GT3 Cup	Porsche 4.0L F6	DAY; 19	COA	BAR	ATL	BEL	MOH	WGL; 12	IMS	ELK	KNS	LAG	LIM			47th	35

=== Complete 24 Hours of Le Mans results ===
Year	Team	Co-Drivers	Car	Class	Laps	Pos.	Class Pos.
2000	(United States) Corvette Racing	(France) Franck Fréon (United States) Andy Pilgrim	Chevrolet Corvette C5-R	GTS	327	10th	**3rd**
2001	(United States) Corvette Racing Pratt	(United States) Andy Pilgrim (France) Franck Fréon	Chevrolet Corvette C5-R	GTS	271	14th	**2nd**
2002	(United States) Corvette Racing	(United States) Andy Pilgrim (France) Franck Fréon	Chevrolet Corvette C5-R	GTS	331	13th	**2nd**
2003	(United States) Corvette Racing	(United Kingdom) Oliver Gavin (United States) Andy Pilgrim	Chevrolet Corvette C5-R	GTS	326	11th	**2nd**
