= 1989 Barber Saab Pro Series =

1989 Barber Saab Pro Series season

Seasons
- ← 1988 1990 →

The 1989 Barber Saab Pro Series season was the fourth season of the series. All drivers used Saab powered Goodyear shod Mondiale chassis. Robbie Buhl won the championship.

== Race calendar and results ==
Round	Circuit	Location	Date	Winner
1	Bicentennial Park	(United States) Miami, Florida	March 5	(New Zealand) Rob Wilson
2	Road Atlanta	(United States) Braselton, Georgia	April 2	(United States) Robbie Buhl
3	Palm Beach International Raceway	(United States) Jupiter, Florida	April 23	(United Kingdom) Justin Bell
4	Lime Rock Park	(United States) Lime Rock, Connecticut	May 29	(Switzerland) Bernard Santal
5	Mid-Ohio Sports Car Course	(United States) Lexington, Ohio	June 4	(New Zealand) Rob Wilson
6	Watkins Glen International	(United States) Watkins Glen, New York	July 2	(United States) Robbie Buhl
7	Road America	(United States) Elkhart Lake, Wisconsin	July 16	(United States) Robbie Buhl
8	Portland International Raceway	(United States) Portland, Oregon	July 30	(United States) Robbie Buhl
9	Heartland Park Topeka	(United States) Topeka, Kansas	August 13	(United States) Robbie Buhl
10	Sears Point Raceway	(United States) Sonoma, California	September 10	(United States) Robbie Buhl
11	Tampa Street Circuit	(United States) Tampa, Florida	October 1	(United States) Robbie Buhl
12	Del Mar Fairgrounds	(United States) Del Mar, California	October 22	(New Zealand) Rob Wilson

== Final standings ==
Rank	Driver	(United States) MIA	(United States) RAT	(United States) WPB	(United States) LRP	(United States) MOH	(United States) WGI	(United States) ROA	(United States) POR	(United States) TOP	(United States) SON	(United States) TAM	(United States) DM	Points
1	(United States) Robbie Buhl		1				1	1	1	1	1	1		188
2	(New Zealand) Rob Wilson	1				1			3	3			1	143
3	(United Kingdom) Justin Bell			1					2	13				132
4	(Switzerland) Bernard Santal				1									58
5	(United States) Brian Till								4	2				53
6	(United States) Jim Pace									12				47
7	(United States) Bob Dotson									8				45
8	(United Kingdom) Ian Ashley													42
9	(United States) Nick Kunewalder									16				35
10	(United States) Jeff Boyce								5	6				34
11	(United States) Matt Blevins									5				28
12	(United States) John Tanner									7				28
13	(United States) John Cochran													25
14	(United States) John Bigham													12
15	(United States) Sean Jones									4				10
	(United States) Scott Anderson									14				
	(United States) Antonio Covelli									11				
	(United States) John Duke									10				
	(United States) George Sutcliffe									9				
	(United States) Andy Swett									15				
