= 1991 Barber Saab Pro Series =

1991 Barber Saab Pro Series season

Seasons
- ← 1990 1992 →

The 1991 Barber Saab Pro Series season was the fifth season of the series. This was the first season the class had a title sponsor, Zerex. All drivers used Saab powered Goodyear shod Mondiale chassis. Bryan Herta won the championship.

== Race calendar and results ==
Round	Circuit	Location	Date	Winner
1	Palm Beach International Raceway	(United States) Jupiter, Florida	March 3	(United Kingdom) John Robinson
2	Bicentennial Park	(United States) Miami, Florida	April 7	(United Kingdom) John Robinson
3	Road Atlanta	(United States) Braselton, Georgia	April 28	(United Kingdom) John Robinson
4	Lime Rock Park	(United States) Lime Rock, Connecticut	May 27	(United States) Bryan Herta
5	Mid-Ohio Sports Car Course	(United States) Lexington, Ohio	June 2	(United Kingdom) John Robinson
6	New Orleans street circuit	(United States) New Orleans, Louisiana	June 16	(United States) Bryan Herta
7	Watkins Glen International	(United States) Watkins Glen, New York	June 30	(United Kingdom) John Robinson
8	Mazda Raceway Laguna Seca	(United States) Monterey County, California	July 15	(United States) Bryan Herta
9	Portland International Raceway	(United States) Portland, Oregon	July 28	(United States) Bryan Herta
10	Road America	(United States) Elkhart Lake, Wisconsin	August 25	(United Kingdom) John Robinson
11	Road America	(United States) Elkhart Lake, Wisconsin	September 22	(United States) Leo Parente
12	Del Mar Fairgrounds	(United States) Del Mar, California	October 13	(United Kingdom) John Robinson

== Final standings ==
Color	Result
Gold	Winner
Silver	2nd place
Bronze	3rd place
Green	4th & 5th place
Light Blue	6th–10th place
Dark Blue	11th place or lower
Purple	Did not finish
Red	Did not qualify (DNQ)
Brown	Withdrawn (Wth)
Black	Disqualified (DSQ)
White	Did not start (DNS)
Blank	Did not participate (DNP)
Blank	Driver replacement (Rpl)
Blank	Injured (Inj)
Blank	No race held (NH)

Rank	Driver	(United States) PBI	(United States) BIC	(United States) ATL	(United States) LRP	(United States) DAL	(United States) NOR	(United States) WGI	(United States) LAG	(United States) POR	(United States) ROA1	(United States) ROA2	(United States) DMS	Points
1	(United States) Bryan Herta							3					2	163
2	(United Kingdom) John Robinson							1					1	160
3	(Sweden) Robert Amren							4					21	105
4	(United States) Page Jones							2					10	102
5	(United States) Leo Parente							19					3	71
6	(United States) Barry Waddell							9					23	54
7	(United Kingdom) Ross Hockenhull							8					5	50
8	(United States) Mark Tremblay							5					6	40
9	(United States) David Pook							11					22	36
10	(Finland) Tony Leivo							15					4	34
	(Sweden) Nicke Blom												9	
	(United States) John Bostick							14						
	(United States) Buzz Calkins							12					19	
	(Italy) Riccardo Dona							6						
	(United States) Patrick Hasburgh							18					13	
	(United States) Stephen Hynes							16						
	(United States) Tom Juckette												16	
	(United States) Kurt Kossmann							7						
	(United States) Nick Kunewalder												20	
	(United States) Jeff Laughlin												15	
	(United States) Cecil Lepard												17	
	(United States) Art Manni Jr.												11	
	(United States) Alex Padilla							13					8	
	(United States) Stan Potter							10						
	(United States) Christopher Smith												18	
	(United States) Chuck Thomas												14	
	(United States) Greg Tracy												7	
	(United States) Peter Trigg							17						
	(United States) Kimble Williams												12	
