= 2008 Dubai 24 Hour =

Motorsports endurance race

Seasons
- ← 2007 2009 →

The layout of the Dubai Autodrome.

The 2008 Dubai 24 Hour was an 24 hour automobile endurance race and the third running of the Dubai 24 Hour. The event was held on 10 to 12 January at the Dubai Autodrome, United Arab Emirates. The winning car was an A6 class Porsche RSR run by VIP Pet Foods and shared between Australian drivers Tony Quinn, Klark Quinn, Craig Baird from New Zealand and Jonathon Webb of Australia.

== Result ==
| Pos | Class | No | Entrant | Drivers | Car | Laps |
|---|---|---|---|---|---|---|
| 1 | A6 | 39 | (Australia) VIP Pet foods 1 | (Australia) Tony Quinn (Australia) Klark Quinn (New Zealand) Craig Baird (Australia) Jonathon Webb | Porsche RSR | 504 |
| 2 | A6 | 11 | (Netherlands) Bleekemolen 1 RacePanet | (Netherlands) Michael Bleekemolen (Netherlands) Sebastiaan Bleekemolen (Netherlands) Jan Lammers (Netherlands) Jeroen Bleekemolen | Porsche 997 GT3 Cup | 499 |
| 3 | SP1 | 105 | Delahaye 2 Renault Belgium | (Belgium) Bas Leinders (Belgium) Stéphane Lémeret (Belgium) Greg Franchi (Belgium) Vincent Vosse (Belgium) Frédéric Bouvy | Renault Mégane Trophy | 498 |
| 4 | A6 | 26 | (Australia) Juniper Racing | (Australia) Shaun Juniper (Australia) Max Twigg (Australia) Paul Kelly (Australia) David Russell | Porsche 997 RSR | 496 |
| 5 | A5 | 48 | (Germany) ORMS-Racing | (Germany) Marko Hartung (Germany) Stefan Neuberger (Germany) Franz Engstler | BMW Z4 Coupé | 496 |
| 6 | A6 | 29 | (Austria) SAS Lechner Racing 2 | (Germany) Christian Menzel (Germany) Pierre Kaffer (Germany) Hannes Plesse (Austria) Hannes Danzinger | Porsche 997 GT3 Cup | 490 |
| 7 | A6 | 32 | (Belgium) Speed Lover Team | (Italy) Luca Ferrari (Italy) Mauro Casadei (Netherlands) Tom Langenbergh (Belgium) Bert van Rossem | Porsche 997 GT3 | 484 |
| 8 | A6 | 33 | Porsche Club Singapore | (Malaysia) Mok Weng Sun (Singapore) Ringo Chong (Sri Lanka) Dilantha Malagamuwa (Singapore) Melvin Choo (Malaysia) Tunku Hammam | Porsche 997 GT3 RSR | 482 |
| 9 | A6 | 9 | (Lithuania) Hoptrans-Toverasport | (Russia) Ilya Burenko (Russia) Alexey Vasiliev (United Arab Emirates) Karim Al-Azhari (Lithuania) Darius Brazdžionis (Latvia) Aivaras Pyragius | Porsche 997 GT3 | 480 |
| 10 | A5 | 24 | (Netherlands) Motors Television | (Netherlands) Peter van der Kolk (Netherlands) Richard van den Berg (Germany) Elmar Grimm (Netherlands) Cor Euser | BMW Compact GTR | 476 |
| 11 | A5 | 1 | (Austria) Duller Motorsport 1 | (Austria) Dieter Quester (Austria) Philipp Peter (Italy) Stefano Zonca (Italy) Andrea Belicchi (Morocco) Mehdi Bennani | BMW M3 E46 | 476 |
| 12 | A6 | 15 | (Belgium) G-Force Racing 1 | (Belgium) Frank Hahn (Belgium) Pierre Merche (France) Frédéric Da Rocha (France) Jean-François Le Roch | Porsche 997 GT3 | 472 |
| 13 | SP1 | 107 | (Netherlands) Equipe Verschuur 1 | (Netherlands) Bernhard ten Brinke (Netherlands) Wim Beelen (Netherlands) David Hart (Netherlands) Mike Verschuur (Netherlands) Jaap van Lagen | Renault Mégane Trophy | 472 |
| 14 | A6 | 27 | (Germany) CC Car Collection GmbH | (Germany) Peter Schmidt (Germany) David Horn (Germany) Robert Römer (Germany) Rüdiger Klos (Germany) Bruno Fechner | Porsche 996 GT3 Cup | 467 |
| 15 | D1 | 99 | (Germany) Schubert Motorsport 1 | (Germany) Heinz Schmersal (Norway) Stian Sørlie (Germany) Jörg Viebahn (Germany) Claudia Hürtgen | BMW 120D | 464 |
| 16 | A2 | 71 | (Germany) Maeder Motorsport | (Germany) Andreas Mäder (Germany) "Randy Walls" (Switzerland) Harald Jacksties (Germany) Reiner Schönauer (Germany) Friedhelm Mihm | Honda S2000 | 458 |
| 17 | D1 | 96 | (Belgium) Beliën Motorsport | (Belgium) Patrick Beliën (Belgium) Dimitri Cuyvers (Belgium) Bob Cuyvers (Belgium) Stefan Verhoeven | BMW 120D | 457 |
| 18 | A6 | 25 | (Belgium) G-Force Racing 2 | (Belgium) Philippe Greisch (Belgium) Christian Kelders (France) Catherine Desbruères (France) Daniel Desbruères | Porsche 997 GT3 | 457 |
| 19 | A2 | 77 | (Belgium) RP Dom Racing | (Belgium) Renaud Kuppens (France) Sébastien Dhouailly (United Arab Emirates) Maktoum Hasher Maktoum Al Maktoum (United Arab Emirates) Thani Bin Thani | Renault Clio Cup | 456 |
| 20 | D1 | 100 | (Saudi Arabia) Al-Faisal Racing Team | (Saudi Arabia) Khaled Bin Sultan Al Faisal (Saudi Arabia) Abdulaziz Al Faisal (United Kingdom) Paul Spooner (Saudi Arabia) Bandar Alesayi | BMW 120D | 454 |
| 21 | A5 | 47 | (United Kingdom) RJN Motorsport | (Denmark) Kurt Thiim (Germany) Holger Eckhardt (United Kingdom) Richard Maeden (United Kingdom) Alex Buncombe | Nissan 350z | 451 |
| 22 | SP2 | 123 | (United Arab Emirates) Khaleji Motorsport | (United States) John Sinders (Saudi Arabia) Karim Ojjeh (United Kingdom) Joe Macari (United Kingdom) Adrian Newey (New Zealand) Rob Wilson | Ferrari 430 GTC | 447 |
| 23 | SP1 | 102 | (France) Solution-F | (France) Eric Gasperini (France) Eric Vigouroux (France) Franck Sias (France) Gilles Chatelain | Solution-F Touring Cup | 444 |
| 24 | A5 | 46 | (Netherlands) Musch Motorsport | (Netherlands) Frank Nebig (Germany) Martina Bossert (Netherlands) Michel Schaap (Germany) Harald Schlotter | BMW M3 | 444 |
| 25 | D1 | 95 | (Netherlands) Achterberg Motorsport | (Netherlands) Pim van Riet (Netherlands) Frank Wilschut (Netherlands) Renate Sanders | BMW 120D | 442 |
| 26 | A2 | 73 | (Netherlands) Equipe Verschuur 3 | (Netherlands) Mickey Bertram (Netherlands) Sheila Verschuur (Netherlands) Harrie Kolen | Renault Clio II RS Cup | 442 |
| 27 | A5 | 41 | (Germany) Black Falcon | (Germany) Alex Böhm (Republic of Ireland) Sean Paul Breslin (Italy) Diego Romanini (Netherlands) Dillon Koster (Germany) Marian Winz | BMW M3 E46 | 438 |
| 28 | A5 | 43 | (Germany) German Wheels.com | (Germany) Michael Luther (Germany) Hans-Olaf Beckmann (Germany) Peter Hass | BMW M3 E46 | 438 |
| 29 | A4 | 62 | (Netherlands) Bleekemolen 3 Race Planet | (Netherlands) Hans Rutte (Netherlands) Ronald van de Laer (Netherlands) Hans Bos (Netherlands) Melvin de Groot | BMW 130i | 435 |
| 30 | A2 | 79 | (France) Newedge 2 | (France) Benjamin Breton (France) Patrice Garrouste (France) Jean-Marc Thevenot (France) Marc Thomas Guillot (Canada) Ramez Azzam | Renault Clio Cup | 435 |
| 31 | A2 | 65 | (United Kingdom) Rapid Chariots | (United Kingdom) Rupert Laslett (United Kingdom) Alan Wilshere (United Kingdom) Torsten Skeen | Honda Civic Type R | 434 |
| 32 | D1 | 98 | (Germany) Oettinger Sport RSR | (Germany) Eberhard Rattunde (New Zealand) Wayne Moore (Germany) Heinrich Immig (New Zealand) Maurice O'Reilly | Volkswagen Golf V R - TDI | 432 |
| 33 | D1 | 90 | (Poland) TOYO Pachura Motorsport | (Poland) Patryk Pachura (Poland) Robert Lukas (Poland) Teodor Myszkowski (Poland) Stefan Bilinski (Poland) Mariusz Miekos | Volkswagen Golf V | 430 |
| 34 | D1 | 89 | (Germany) Schubert Motorsport 2 | (Denmark) Jacob Tackman-Thomson (Denmark) René Rasmussen (France) Pierre Guichard (Denmark) Jan Kalmar | BMW 120D | 427 |
| 35 | A6 | 7 | (Belgium) First Motorsport Team 1 | (Belgium) Wim Jeurs (Belgium) Ronald Vetters (Belgium) Pascal Nelissen-Grade (Belgium) Dries Heyman | Porsche 996 Supercup | 426 |
| 36 | A1 | 82 | (Germany) Rhino's 2 Leipert Motorsport | (Germany) Marcel Leipert (Latvia) Pavel Gontary (Latvia) Mareks Stolcermanis (Ukraine) Oleksander Sanylchenko | Ford Fiesta | 425 |
| 37 | A1 | 81 | (Germany) Rhino's 2 Leipert Motorsport | (Switzerland) Fredy Barth (Italy) Antonio Citera (Germany) Joe Schmidtler (Germany) Christoper Mies | Ford Fiesta | 425 |
| 38 | SP1 | 103 | (Hungary) Bovi Motorsport 1 | (Hungary) Kálmán Bódis (Hungary) István Rácz (Hungary) Attila Barta (France) Marco Saviozzi (United Kingdom) Charles Hall | Brokernet Silver Sting | 422 |
| 39 | A2 | 42 | (Belgium) ADS Racing | (Belgium) René Franchi (Belgium) Fabrice Warroquiers (Belgium) Jean-Michel Gérome (Belgium) Jean-Pierre Vandewauver | Renault Clio | 421 |
| 40 | A6 | 17 | (Lithuania) Oktanas Racing Team | (Lithuania) Nemunas Dagilis (Lithuania) Nerijus Dagilis (Lithuania) Egidijus Dapsas (Germany) Uwe Alzen (Switzerland) Marc Benz | Porsche 996 RSR | 420 |
| 41 | A5 | 42 | (Luxembourg) DUWO Racing Team | (Luxembourg) Jean-Marie Dumont (Belgium) Frédéric Schmit (Belgium) Nicolas Schmit (Germany) Ulfried Baumert (Canada) Ken MacAlpine | BMW M3 E46 | 417 |
| 42 | A6 | 28 | (Austria) SAS Lechner Racing 1 | (Republic of Ireland) Damien Faulkner (Slovakia) Stefan Rosina (Austria) Walter Lechner Jr. (Austria) Robert Lechner | Porsche 997 GT3 RSR | 416 |
| 43 | A1 | 83 | (Germany) Ebbing Motorsport 3 | (Germany) Jana Meiswinkel (Germany) Klaus Ebbing (Netherlands) Ernst Berg (Germany) Martin Kinzler | Ford Fiesta ST | 415 |
| 44 | A4 | 23 | (Germany) Red Motorsport | (Germany) Martin Roos (Germany) Mirco Schultis (Germany) Martin Richter (United Kingdom) Andrew Donaldson (United Kingdom) Simon Mason | Lotus Red Exige SR | 414 |
| 45 | A5 | 50 | (Hungary) Zengő Motorsport 1 | (Hungary) Zoltán Zengő (Hungary) László Csuti (Hungary) Viktor Csuti (Hungary) Tibor Nagy | Seat Leon Supercopa | 414 |
| 46 | A6 | 40 | (Australia) VIP Pet foods 2 | (Australia) Dean Grant (Australia) Daniel Pappas (Germany) Jens Richter (Australia) Trevor Scheumack | Porsche 911 GT3 Cup | 408 |
| 47 | A4 | 66 | (United Kingdom) Mini Motorsport | (United Kingdom) Paul harvey (United Kingdom) Shaun King | Mini Cooper S | 405 |
| 48 | A6 | 21 | (United Kingdom) Team RPM | (United Kingdom) Peter Bamford (Republic of Ireland) Matt Griffin (United Kingdom) Daniel Welch (United Kingdom) Jim Geddie | Porsche 997 Cup | 405 |
| 49 | D1 | 92 | VW Motorsport Team Austria 2 | (Austria) Seppi Stigler (Austria) Christian Salwauper (Germany) Kai Jordan (Austria) Andreas Waldherr (Austria) Erich Weber | Volkswagen Golf V 2.0 TDI 16V | 403 |
| 50 | D1 | 91 | VW Motorsport Team Austria 1 | (Austria) Andreas Waldherr (Austria) Erich Weber (Germany) Ralph Bonhorst (Austria) Dieter Svepes (Austria) Seppi Stigler | Volkswagen Golf V 2.0 TDI 16V | 394 |
| 51 | A1 | 84 | (Germany) Team Klos Motorsport | (Germany) Manuel Brinkmann (Switzerland) Alexander Wetzlich (Germany) Sebastian Voges (Germany) Rüdiger Klos (Hungary) Zsolt Csüllög | Ford Fiesta ST | 391 |
| 52 | A5 | 44 | (Germany) Tschornia Motorsport | (Germany) Christian Tschornia (Germany) Thomas Henkel (Germany) Michael Schneider (Germany) Karl-Heinz Teichmann | BMW E46 WTC | 389 |
| 53 | A2 | 80 | (France) Newedge 1 | (France) Marco Savaiozzi (France) Pierre Bès (France) Pierre Renom (France) Thomas Leriche (Spain) Javier Escobar | Renault Clio | 388 |
| 54 | A4 | 75 | (United Kingdom) Brunswick Automotive | (United Kingdom) Giles Groombridge (United Kingdom) Dave Ashford (United Kingdom) James Baxter (United Kingdom) Matthew West (United Kingdom) Nick Gooch | Mazda RX7 | 384 |
| 55 | A5 | 54 | (United Arab Emirates) Emirates Racing Team | (United Arab Emirates) Mohammad Alfalasi (United Arab Emirates) Khalid Al Mutawaa (United Arab Emirates) Mohammed Al Abdooli (United Arab Emirates) Thani Bin Thani (United Arab Emirates) Omran Al Owais | Volkswagen Golf GTI | 376 |
| 56 | A1 | 76 | Endurance Club Hungary | (Hungary) Gábor Bankuti (Hungary) István Gaspar (Hungary) Gustav Herter (Hungary) Tibor Laczkó (Hungary) Béla Nyitray | Ford Fiesta ST | 372 |
| 57 | A6 | 35 | (Netherlands) TopGoed Racing Lammertink | (Netherlands) Michael Boertien (Netherlands) Jacques Groenewegen (United States) Tim Pappas | Porsche 997 GT3 Cup | 369 |
| 58 | SP1 | 111 | (France) Solution F Coronel | (Netherlands) Raymond Coronel (Netherlands) Jeroen Schothorst (Netherlands) Ben Kolff (Netherlands) Rembert Berg | Solution-F Touring Cup | 368 |
| 59 | A6 | 16 | (Belgium) VDS Racing Adventures | (Belgium) Raphaël van der Straaten (Belgium) Christian Deridder (Belgium) Alain Fischer (Belgium) Amin Bentchikou | BMW M5 E34 | 366 |
| 60 | SP1 | 101 | (France) Gomez Competition | (France) Hervé Migeo (France) Kevin Morel (France) Arnaud Gomez (France) Jérémy Reymond | Solution-F Touring Cup | 365 |
| 61 | A6 | 14 | (Austria) Jetalliance Racing | (Austria) Lukas Lichtner-Hoyer (United Kingdom) Ryan Sharp (Austria) Vitus Eckert (Austria) Karl Wendlinger (Austria) Klaus Engelhorn | Porsche 996 RSR | 362 |
| 62 | SP1 | 108 | (Netherlands) Equipe Verschuur 2 | (Netherlands) Wilko Becker (Netherlands) Hoevert Vos (Netherlands) Frans Verschuur (Netherlands) Tim Buijs | Renault Mégane Trophy | 359 |
| 63 | A6 | 10 | (Sweden) Hubert Bergh Motorsport | (Sweden) Lars Stugemo (Sweden) Markus Lonnroth (Sweden) Manfred Gottschlich (Sweden) Magnus Öhman (Sweden) Hubert Bergh | Porsche 997 | 341 |
| 64 | A6 | 37 | (Spain) Escuela Española de Pilotos | (Portugal) Francisco Cruz Martins (Portugal) José Dória de Freitas (Spain) Jaime Garcia Sanchis (Portugal) Antonio Gellweiler | Porsche 997 GT3 Cup | 341 |
| 65 | D1 | 97 | (Netherlands) Mad and Daring 1 | (Netherlands) Alex van't Hoff (Netherlands) Danny Werkman (Netherlands) Rick Abresch (Netherlands) Kevin Veltman | BMW 120D | 337 |
| 66 | A6 | 3 | (Belgium) Prospeed Competition 1 | (Belgium) Rudi Penders (Belgium) Franz Lamot (Finland) Markus Palttala (Finland) Mikael Forsten | Porsche 996 GT3 RS | 326 |
| 67 | SP1 | 106 | (Lithuania) AutoMoto Chervonenko | (Ukraine) Evgen Chervonenko (Ukraine) Aleksandr Saliuk (Lithuania) Saulius Girdauskas (Latvia) Raimonds Kisiels (Ukraine) Volodymyr Kondratenko | Renault Mégane Trophy | 322 |
| 68 | D1 | 86 | (Netherlands) TOYO Red Camel Racing | (Netherlands) Henk Thijssen (Netherlands) Ton Verkoelen (Germany) Edgar Schönleben (Netherlands) Ivo Breukers | Seat Leon 1.9 TDI | 320 |
| 69 | A4 | 61 | (Netherlands) Bas Koeten Racing | (Netherlands) Henk de Jong (Netherlands) Bert de Heus (Netherlands) Cees Visser (Netherlands) Kees Rijnhout (Netherlands) Robbert Rijnhout | BMW Z3 M Coupé | 290 |
| 70 | A6 | 12 | (Netherlands) Bleekemolen 2 Race Planet | (Netherlands) John Hugenholtz (France) Damien Kohler (France) Michel Mora (France) Jean-Marc Merlin | Porsche 997 GT3 Cup | 286 |
| 71 | A5 | 53 | (Austria) Duller Motorsport 2 | (Italy) Frederico Della Volta (Morocco) Mehdi Bennani (Italy) Bruno Barbaro (Italy) Beppe Arlotti | BMW M3 E46 | 281 |
| 72 | A2 | 72 | (Germany) Ebbing Motorsport 2 | (Germany) Roland Borton (Germany) Klaus Hormes (Germany) Roland Botor (Germany) Frank Aust | Renault Clio | 248 |
| 73 | A5 | 51 | (Hungary) Zengő Motorsport 2 | (Hungary) Balázs Sarrang (Hungary) Peter Zsille (Hungary) György Kontra (Hungary) István Balásdi-Szabó | Seat Leon Supercopa | 205 |
| 74 | A6 | 8 | (Belgium) First Motorsport Team 2 | (Belgium) Niels Lagrange (Belgium) Michel Pulinx (France) Thierry Blaise (France) Jean-Charles Perrin | Porsche 996 Supercup | 203 |
| 75 | D1 | 45 | (Netherlands) Mad and Daring 2 | (Netherlands) Marcel Nooren (Netherlands) Nicky Pastorelli (Netherlands) Francesco Pastorelli (United Arab Emirates) Nadir Zuhour (Netherlands) Glen Veltman | BMW 120D | 203 |
| 76 | A6 | 20 | (Hungary) Bovi Motorsport 2 | (Hungary) Kálmán Bódis (Hungary) Ferenc Ratkai (Hungary) Kristián Fekete (Hungary) István Ràcz (Hungary) Attila Barta | Porsche 996 RS GT3 | 196 |
| 77 | SP1 | 104 | Delahaye 1 Renault Belgium | (Belgium) Bas Leinders (Belgium) Stéphane Lémeret (Belgium) Greg Franchi (Belgium) Vincent Vosse (Belgium) Frédéric Bouvy | Renault Mégane Trophy | 172 |
| 78 | D1 | 93 | (Netherlands) Marcos Racing International 1 | (Netherlands) Richard Verburg (United Arab Emirates) Phillip Abdul Aziz Al-Redha (Spain) Lucas Guerrero (Spain) Alejandro Núñez | BMW 120D | 157 |
| 79 | D1 | 94 | (Netherlands) Marcos Racing International 2 | (Netherlands) Peter van der Kolk (Netherlands) Maurits Knopjes (Netherlands) Fred van Putten (El Salvador) Toto Lassally (Hungary) Attila Barta | BMW 120D | 151 |
| 80 | A2 | 78 | (United Arab Emirates) MSW Racing Dubai | (United Kingdom) Jonathan Simmonds (United Kingdom) Julian Griffin (United Kingdom) Phil Quaife | Renault Clio | 137 |
| 81 | A6 | 36 | (Germany) Ebbing Motorsport 1 | (Germany) Klaus Werner (Germany) Michael Budde (Austria) Christopher Zöchling (South Africa) Jordan Grogor (Germany) Klaus Ebbing | Porsche 996 RS | 114 |
| 82 | SP2 | 888 | (Netherlands) CR8 Project | (Netherlands) Ivo Breukers (Netherlands) Jan Lammers (Netherlands) Cor Euser (Netherlands) Jaap van Lagen | Audi R8 | 113 |
| 83 | A6 | 31 | (Germany) Proton Competition | (Denmark) Lars-Erik Nielsen (Denmark) Allan Simonsen (United Kingdom) Richard Westbrook (Germany) Christian Ried | Porsche 997 GT3 RSR | 108 |
| 84 | A6 | 38 | (Germany) KRS-Racing | (Germany) André Krumbach (Germany) Florian Scholze (Germany) André Thiele (Germany) Kai Riemer | Porsche 996 GT3 | 100 |
| 85 | A6 | 5 | (Slovakia) Autoracing Club Bratislava | (Slovakia) Miro Konôpka (United States) Jim Michaelian (Germany) Jürgen Bender (Germany) Martin Dechent | Porsche 996 GT3 RS | 53 |
| 86 | A6 | 2 | (Austria) Konrad Motorsport | (Germany) Wolfgang Kaufmann (Austria) Franz Konrad (Germany) Michael Schrey (Netherlands) Jeroen Bleekemolen | Porsche 997 RSR | 17 |
| DNS | A6 | 59 | (Germany) Online Leasing Attempto | (Austria) Sven Heyrowsky (Germany) Florian Scholze (Turkey) Arkin Aka (Germany) Jürgen Gerlach (Germany) Markus Kauderer | Porsche 997 GT3 Cup | 0 |
