= 1990 Barber Saab Pro Series =

1990 Barber Saab Pro Series season

Seasons
- ← 1989 1991 →

The 1990 Barber Saab Pro Series season was the fifth season of the series. All drivers used Saab powered Goodyear shod Mondiale chassis. Rob Wilson won the championship. Wilson was the first non-American to win the Barber Saab Pro Series.

== Race calendar and results ==
Round	Circuit	Location	Date	Winner
1	Bicentennial Park	(United States) Miami, Florida	February 25	(New Zealand) Rob Wilson
2	Road Atlanta	(United States) Braselton, Georgia	April 1	(United Kingdom) John Robinson
3	Palm Beach International Raceway	(United States) Jupiter, Florida	April 22	(New Zealand) Rob Wilson
4	Heartland Park Topeka	(United States) Topeka, Kansas	May 6	(New Zealand) Rob Wilson
5	Lime Rock Park	(United States) Lime Rock, Connecticut	May 28	(New Zealand) Rob Wilson
6	Mid-Ohio Sports Car Course	(United States) Lexington, Ohio	June 3	(New Zealand) Rob Wilson
7	Watkins Glen International	(United States) Watkins Glen, New York	July 1	(United States) John Bigham
8	Sears Point Raceway	(United States) Sonoma, California	July 15	(United Kingdom) John Robinson
9	Portland International Raceway	(United States) Portland, Oregon	July 29	(New Zealand) Steve Cameron
10	Road America	(United States) Elkhart Lake, Wisconsin	August 19	(United States) John Tanner
11	Tampa Street Circuit	(United States) Tampa, Florida	September 30	(United Kingdom) John Robinson
12	Del Mar Fairgrounds	(United States) Del Mar, California	October 11	(New Zealand) Rob Wilson

== Final standings ==
Rank	Driver	(United States) MIA	(United States) ATL	(United States) PBI	(United States) TOP	(United States) LRP	(United States) MOH	(United States) WGI	(United States) SON	(United States) POR	(United States) ROA	(United States) TAM	(United States) DMF	Points
1	(New Zealand) Rob Wilson	1		1	1	1	1					9	1	174
2	(United Kingdom) John Robinson		1		5				1			1		119
3	(United States) John Tanner				2						1	15		95
4	(New Zealand) Steve Cameron				4					1				93
5	(United States) Bryan Herta				13							16		55
6	(United States) John Bigham				3			1				8		54
7	(United States) Nick Kunewalder				10									34
8	(United States) Walt Bohren				6									32
9	(Sweden) Robert Amren											2		30
10	(United States) Jim Pace				20									30
11	(United States) Bert Hart				11									22
12	(United States) Page Jones											3		22
13	(United States) Briggs Phillips				21									22
14	(United States) Kelly Collins				9									21
15	(United States) Mark Jaremko													18
	(United States) Matt Blevins				19									
	(United States) Matt Christian				24									
	(United States) Bud Clark				17									
	(United States) Bob Dotson				7									
	(United States) Victor Gonzalez				23									
	(United States) Jon Gooding											10		
	(United States) John Hotchkis											17		
	(United States) Tom Juckette				16							11		
	(Finland) Tony Leivo											4		
	(United States) Cecil Lepard											12		
	(United States) Art Mann				14									
	(United States) Leo Parente				15							6		
	(United States) Lee Parkinson											18		
	(United States) David Pook											5		
	(United States) Bob Reid											13		
	(United States) Wes Short											7		
	(United States) Glenn Straub				8									
	(United States) John Thompson				18									
	(United States) Blair Walker											14		
	(United States) Dan Wall				12									
	(United States) Bret Weiss				22									
