= Rob Wilson (racing driver) =

New Zealand racing driver

- Nationality: (New Zealand) New Zealander
- Born: 6 September 1952 (age 74) Auckland, New Zealand

Bathurst 12 Hour
- Years active: 2012; 2010
- Teams: Black Falcon; Greg Murphy Racing
- Starts: 2
- Wins: 0
- Poles: 0
- Fastest laps: 0
- Best finish: DNF in 2012, 2010

Previous series
- 2008 2007 2007 2005 2004, 2006 2002 2001 1999, 2005 1996 1995, 1997 1994–1997 1991 1991, 1994 1988–1990 1982–1987 1980–1981 1978–1980 1977–1978 1975–1976 1975: Dubai 24 Hour; FIA GT3 European Championship; American Le Mans Series; 24 Hours of Le Mans; Le Mans Series; American Le Mans Series; British GT Championship; FIA GT Championship; IndyCar Series; NASCAR Busch Series; Busch East Series; IMSA Supercar Championship; Indy Lights; Barber Saab Pro Series; British Formula Three Championship; Formula Pacific; British Formula Three Championship; British Formula Ford 2000; New Zealand Formula Ford; British Formula Ford

Championship titles
- 2008 1990: Dubai 24 Hour SP2 class Barber Saab Pro Series

NASCAR O'Reilly Auto Parts Series career
- 3 races run over 2 years
- Car no., team: 9, Joe Bessey; 60, Tom Pease
- Best finish: 15th
- First race: 1995 Meridian Advantage 200
- Last race: 1997 Lysol 200
- Statistics up to date as of 16 March 2014.

24 Hours of Le Mans career
- Years: 1994; 2004; 2005
- Teams: Chamberlain Engineering; Cirtek Motorsport
- Best finish: 19th

Rob Wilson (born 6 September 1952) is a driving coach and a former racing driver from New Zealand. Wilson raced in various formula racing and endurance racing series.

== Career history ==
=== Formula racing ===
Wilson won a scholarship to race in the 1975 British Formula Ford season. The following year, he returned to New Zealand to race in the New Zealand Formula Ford Championship, where he came in second in the championship. He won a British Formula Ford 2000 race at Mallory Park in 1977, driving a Reynard. When he entered the British Formula Three Championship, he won the fifteenth race of the season at Mallory Park. Scoring another two podium finishes, he ended up sixth in the BARC championship. The following season, Wilson raced with year old equipment and could only score four points. He then won the 1980 BARC TV Trophy, a non-championship race for Formula 3 cars. In the British championship, he scored five podium finishes and secured the fifth place in the standings. In early 1981, the New Zealander returned to his home country. He raced a part-time schedule in the Formula Pacific series. His best result came at Manfeild Autocourse, here he finished third out of ten drivers. After obtaining his FIA Super Licence, he tried his racing luck in Formula One. He was first approached by Fittipaldi Automotive to replace the retiring Emerson Fittipaldi. But after the Brazilian cruzeiro was devaluated, he needed to bring a sponsor which he did not have. Before the 1981 Belgian Grand Prix, Wilson got into contact with Ken Tyrrell. But as Michele Alboreto offered more sponsor money, he got the seat for the remainder of the season.

After a failed try to get into Formula One, Wilson returned to the British Formula Three Championship. The 1984 British Formula Three season was no success. Wilson partnered with Eddie Jordan Racing but failed to score a single point. After some low seasons in the British championship, Wilson moved to the United States.

After moving to the United States, Wilson started to race in the Barber Saab Pro Series. Wilson scored a fifth place in the 1988 season. During the season, he won two races, at Road America and in the streets of Tamiami Park. The 1989 Barber Saab Pro Series season had more success, where he won three races. While Robbie Buhl dominated the season, Wilson achieved the runner up position in the championship beating Justin Bell. Wilsons big break through came in 1990. The driver won six out of the twelve rounds of the series and won the championship by 55 points. With eleven wins Rob Wilson is the winningest driver in the 18 years of the Barber Pro Series.

After winning the championship, Wilson started in the Indy Lights in 1991. His best result came at Mid-Ohio Sports Car Course while driving for Stuart Moore Racing. Wilson finished ninth in his March Wildcat. Wilson returned in Indy Lights in 1994. While driving for Team Leisy, he achieved his best result in Indy Lights. At the Milwaukee Mile he finished fifth. Wilson scored 22 points and finished twelfth in the standings. With these results, Wilson was the best classified part-time driver even beating some full-time Indy Lights competitors. With the creation of the IndyCar Series, Wilson entered the 1996 Indy 500 with Project Indy. He was entered in a Ford Cosworth XB powered Lola T93/00 sponsored by gun manufacturer Ruger. Racing in 1993 built equipment, Wilson failed to qualify. He was the third fastest non qualifier of a total of ten non qualifiers.

=== NASCAR ===
Wilson made his stockcar racing debut in the 1994 GMC Trucks 200K, a NASCAR Busch North Series race at Lime Rock Park. The 41-year-old started 24th but had to retire after a transmission failure. He returned to the series the following year. His best result came at Nazareth Speedway. While racing a Pontiac owned by Joe Bessey, he finished fifteenth. Wilson achieved the height of is Busch North career in 1996. Wilson led a lap at the 1996 Burnham Boilers 150 at Watkins Glen International, he eventually finished sixth.

In 1995, Wilson made his debut in the NASCAR Busch Grand National Series. He was first entered in the 1995 NE Chevy Dealers 250 at New Hampshire International Speedway but failed to qualify. He qualified 42nd (as last starter) the following race at Nazareth. Racing in the No. 9 Delco Remy Pontiac he raced his way through the field finishing fifteenth. The New Zealander returned for two races in 1997. He failed to finish both races due to mechanical breakdown.

=== Sportscar racing ===
Wilson raced a few races in the IMSA Camel Lights. Wilson and his teammate Ken Knott finished seventh in class in the 1990 Grand Prix of Miami. Rob Wilson drove his first 12 Hours of Sebring in 1991. After 140 laps the Mazda MX-6 had an accident which took it out of the race. The Kiwi also raced full-time in the IMSA Supercar Championship. While driving a Consulier GTP his best finish was a fourth place at Road America. Rob Wilson, with teammates Honorato Espinosa, Felipe Solano and Pete Uria, raced in the 1991 24 Hours of Daytona. The team raced in the GTU class and finished fifteenth overall, second in class. In the 1992 running of the race the car suffered a fire and was classified 21st overall, seventh in class. While racing a Nissan 240SX in the 1995 24 Hours of Daytona the racing team finished sixth overall, second in class. In 1999, Wilson entered two FIA GT rounds. Partnered with Robert Nearn, Wilson was entered by Seikel Motorsport in the Donington 500km. After 45 laps, the Porsche 911 GT2 suffered gearbox problems and had to retire. Wilson competed in the first ever Rolex Sports Car Series, the 2000 24 Hours of Daytona with Martin Henderson. The Pillbeam MP84 suffered gearbox problems after two hours and thirty minutes of racing and had to retire. The MP84 was the only car in the SR2 class. The low car count was not surprising, the SR2 cars were not designed for 24 hours of racing. The following season Wilson raced in the British GT Championship for Hayles Racing in a Chrysler Viper. He won the races at Snetterton, Oulton Park, Knockhill and Brands Hatch. Furthermore, he scored another seven podium finishes. These good results put him in the third place of the championship. In 2004, Wilson competed in all the major endurance races. After finishing eighteenth at Daytona and 28th at Sebring the European season began. His best result in the Le Mans Series came at the 2004 1000 km of Monza where he finished seventeenth. At Le Mans, the team finished nineteenth overall, seventh in class. Wilson ended the season at Petit Le Mans where he failed to finish. Wilson continued to race with Cirtek Motorsport in 2005. In 2006 and 2007, he raced in various GT races. Wilson competed in the 2007 24 Hours of Daytona racing an Infiniti G35. The team had to retire eight hours into the race. The Kiwi also continued to race in Britcar and British GT scoring various top ten finishes in a works Marcos Mantis. With Red Bull Racing designer Adrian Newey as one of his teammates, Wilson achieved a class victory in the 2008 Dubai 24 Hour.

== Outside racing ==
Besides racing itself, Wilson was a racing instructor at the Skip Barber Racing School. Wilson is a driver coach for many aspiring drivers. Juan Pablo Montoya, Kimi Räikkönen, David Coulthard, Marco Andretti, Lance Stroll, Valtteri Bottas, Nikita Mazepin, Giorgio Vinella and Valentino Rossi are among the drivers Wilson has trained over the years. He was also one of the key people involved in the Grand Prix Shootout out of which Tio Ellinas came forth. Most of his driving coaching takes place at Bruntingthorpe Proving Ground.

Wilson is also an avid musician. He played bass guitar during his time with 1970s pop band Edison Lighthouse. Wilson is currently part of country/rock/blues formation Grand Prairie.

== Racing record ==
=== American open–wheel racing results ===
(key)

==== Indy Lights ====
Year	Team	1	2	3	4	5	6	7	8	9	10	11	12	Rank	Points
1991	Stuart Moore Racing	LBH; 10	PHX; 11	MIL; 10	DET	POR	CLE	MEA	TOR	DEN	MOH; 6	NZR	LS; 16	15th	15
1994	Team Leisy	PHX; 10	LBH; Ret	MIL; 5	DET; 9	POR; 9	CLE	TOR	MOH	NHS	VAN	NZR; 12	LS	12th	22

==== IndyCar ====
Year	Team	1	2	3	Rank	Points	Ref
1996	Project Indy	WDW	PHX	INDY; DNQ	NC	-	

=== NASCAR ===
(key) (Bold – Pole position awarded by qualifying time. Italics – Pole position earned by points standings or practice time. * – Most laps led.)

==== Busch Series ====
NASCAR Busch Series results
Year	Team	No.	Make	1	2	3	4	5	6	7	8	9	10	11	12	13	14	15	16	17	18	19	20	21	22	23	24	25	26	27	28	29	30	NBSC	Pts
1995			Chevy	DAY	CAR; DNQ	RCH	ATL	NSV	DAR	BRI	HCY	NHA; DNQ																						N/A	0
1995	Joe Bessey Motorsports	9	Pontiac										NZH; 15	CLT	DOV	MYB	GLN	MLW	TAL	SBO	IRP	MCH	BRI	DAR	RCH	DOV	CLT	CAR	HOM					N/A	0
1997	Pease Motorsports	60	Ford	DAY	CAR	RCH	ATL	LVS	DAR	HCY	TEX	BRI	NSV	TAL	NHA; 32	NZH	CLT	DOV	SBO															88th	107
1997	Pease Motorsports	60	Chevy																	GLN; 41	MLW	MYB	GTY	IRP	MCH	BRI	DAR	RCH	DOV	CLT	CAL	CAR	HOM	88th	107

==== Busch North Series ====
NASCAR Busch North Series results
Year	Team	No.	Make	1	2	3	4	5	6	7	8	9	10	11	12	13	14	15	16	17	18	19	20	21	22	NBNSC	Pts
1994	Astratech Racing	64	Chevy	NHA	NHA	MND	NZH	SPE	HOL	GLN	JEN	EPP	GLN	NHA	WIS	STA	TMP	MND	WMM	RPS	LEE	NHA	LRP; 29			81st	76
1995	Astratech Racing	65	Chevy	DAY	NHA; 35	LEE	JEN	NHA									GLN; 33	EPP	RPS	LEE	STA	BEE	NHA	TMP; 26	LRP	50th	361
1995	Joe Bessey Motorsports	9	Pontiac						NZH; 15	HOL	BEE	TMP	GLN	NHA	TIO	MND										50th	361
1996	Joe Bessey Motorsports	97	Chevy	DAY	LEE	JEN	NZH	HOL	NHA; 14	TIO	BEE	TMP	NZH	NHA	STA	GLN; 6	EPP	RPS	LEE	NHA	NHA	BEE	TMP			49th	332
1996	Joe Bessey Motorsports	1	Chevy																					LRP; 34		49th	332

=== Complete 24 Hours of Le Mans results ===
Year	Team	Co-Drivers	Car	Class	Laps	Pos.	Class Pos.
1994	(United Kingdom) Chamberlain Engineering	(United Kingdom) David Brodie (United Kingdom) William Hewland	Harrier LR9C	GT2	45	DNF	DNF
2004	(United Kingdom) Cirtek Motorsport	(Netherlands) Hans Hugenholtz Jr. (United Kingdom) Frank Mountain	Ferrari 360 Modena	GT LM	311	19th	7th
2005	(United Kingdom) Cirtek Motorsport (Russia) Conversbank	(Sweden) Stefan Eriksson (United Kingdom) Joe Macari	Ferrari 360 Modena GTC	GT2	218	DNF	DNF

=== Complete 12 Hours of Sebring results ===
Year	Result	Team	Car	Class
1991	DNF	Botero Racing	Mazda MX-6	GTU
1992	DNF	Botero Racing	Mazda MX-6	GTU
1993	DNF	Scott Clarke	Porsche 944 Turbo	GT INV
1995	13th	Ecuador Mobil 1 Racing	Nissan 240SX	GTS-2
1996	14th	Ecuador Mobil 1 Racing	Nissan 240SX	GTS-2
2002	DNF	Cirtek Motorsport	Porsche 911 GT3-R	GT
2004	DNF	Cirtek Motorsport	Porsche 911 GT3-R	GT
2007	20th	JMB Racing	Ferrari F430GT	GT2

Sporting positions
Preceded by Robbie Buhl	Barber Saab Pro Series Champion; 1990	Succeeded by Bryan Herta
