= Barber Pro Series =

Professional open-wheel auto racing series

Barber Dodge Pro Series
- Category: Formula racing
- Country: United States; Canada; Mexico
- Inaugural season: 1986
- Folded: 2003
- Constructors: Mondiale (1986–1997); Reynard (1998–2003)
- Engine suppliers: Saab (1986–1994); Dodge (1995–2003)
- Tire suppliers: BFGoodrich Comp/TA R (1986–1987); Goodyear Eagle (1988–1997); Michelin Pilot (1998–2003)
- Last Drivers' champion: (Brazil) Leonardo Maia (2003)
- Official website: Official website

The Barber Dodge Pro Series was an American open-wheel auto racing series promoted by the Skip Barber Racing School from 1986 to 2003. It was one of the first professional spec series for open-wheel racecars in North America. The races were primarily on road and street courses in North America, although the schedule did sometimes include a few ovals.

This series is often confused with Skip Barber's long-standing amateur racing series which has always used different and significantly less powerful cars. The amateur series currently has regional and national components.

The Barber Pro Series was a spec series, in which all cars were identically prepared by Skip Barber Racing. From its beginning in 1986 to 1994, the series was known as the Barber Saab Pro Series; the spec car was a tube-frame Mondiale chassis (basically a Formula Ford 2000 design) powered by a turbocharged 16-valve Saab 16v engine. For the seasons 1986 and 1987, the cars used street-legal racing tires, but for the 1988 season they used Goodyear Racing Eagle slicks instead.

== History ==
The idea was discussed as early as 1979 as a way to get Saab involved in serious motorsports in the United States. Len Lonnegren, PR boss at Saab Cars USA, had heard that Skip Barber was planning to launch an open-wheel "spec car" professional race series, and that it was to run on the same IMSA programs as the GTPs and Camel Lights. Originally Barber had planned on using small displacement naturally aspirated 1,600 cc Dodge engines, but was talked into using turbocharged Saab engines instead. Saab provided engines and spare parts, as well as the assistance of an engineer nicknamed "Turbo Anders" who flew over from Sweden rather frequently once things got rolling. The engines were basically stock 1,985 cc 16-valve twin-cam turbo engines with an output of 225 hp. The engines differed from street versions in that the boost was increased, emission control systems were removed, fuel-injection settings revised and a racing exhaust fitted, together with dry-sump lubrication. Mondiale, based in Northern Ireland was contracted to supply the series with chassis. The first race was run at Meadowlands and was won by Brian Till. By 1991 the marketing strategy at Saab changed and Saab USA did little more than provide the engines.

In 1995, the Saab engine was replaced with a production car 240 hp 3.2 L 24-valve Dodge aluminum sixty degree V6 engine and the series name was changed to the "Barber Dodge Pro Series". The series continued to use the original tube frame Mondiale chassis. In later years, the engines produced 265 hp. SCCA Pro Racing took over the organization from IMSA. The first Dodge powered race was won by Geoff Boss. In 1997 it was announced that Reynard would design and build a new car for the Barber Dodge Pro Series. The Mondiale chassis was retired after twelve years of racing in 1998. The organization was taken over by Professional Sports Car Racing. PSCR was formed by Andy Evans and Roberto Muller after they bought IMSA. For 2002, after CART took over the series, the Skip Barber Challenge was launched. This series comprised three race-weekends. The series was run by the Skip Barber Racing School but used the same cars as the pro series. Both seasons were won by Matt Franc. After the CART organization filed for bankruptcy in early 2004 the Barber Dodge Pro Series was initially put on hiatus. The assets were transferred to Open Wheel Racing Series, LLC who decided not to run a 2004 Barber Dodge Pro Series. As a result, the Skip Barber Racing school decided to focus on the Skip Barber National Championship.

=== Statistics ===
Races	Chassis	Engine	Country
211	Mondiale (143)	Saab (107)	USA (201)
211	Reynard (68)	Dodge (104)	Canada (9)
211	Reynard (68)	Dodge (104)	Mexico (1)

Wins	Drivers
11	Rob Wilson
10	John Robinson, Nilton Rossoni
7	Robbie Buhl, Jeremy Dale, Leonardo Maia, Todd Snyder
6	A. J. Allmendinger, Robert Amren, Kenny Bräck, Bruce Feldman, Fredrik Larsson, Jeff Simmons
5	Geoff Boss, Derek Hill, Rino Mastronardi, Jerry Nadeau
4	Jon Fogarty, Bryan Herta, Sepp Koster, Ken Murillo, Nicolas Rondet, Thomas Schie
3	Diego Guzman, Mark Hotchkis, Harald Huysman, Page Jones, Willy Lewis, Alex Padilla, Matt Plumb, Jaki Scheckter
2	Tim Colwell, Ryan Hunter-Reay, Eric Kielts, Ashton Lewis, Juan Pablo Montoya, Rocky Moran Jr., Memo Rojas, Barry Waddell
1	Justin Bell, Townsend Bell, John Bigham, Andy Boss, Marc Breuers, Jeff Bucknum, Steve Cameron, Davy Cook, Hans de Graaf, Dan Di Leo, Tom Dolan, Ricardo Dona, John Estupinan, Juan Manuel Fangio II, Mauro Fartuszek, Will Langhorne, Tony Leivo, David Martinez, Chris Menninga, Tim Moser, Leo Parente, David Rocha, Bernard Santal, Alexandre Sperafico, Rafael Sperafico, Brandon Sperling, John Tanner, Brian Till, Robby Unser, Michael Valiante, Roger Yasukawa, Luis Zervigon, Andrés Ruiz E

== Cars ==
=== Mondiale ===
Mondiale Car Company was contracted to build cars for the Skip Barber Racing School and the Barber Saab Pro Series. The Pro series car was based on the Formula Ford 2000 chassis Mondiale had experience with. The chassis was a spaceframe design. The powerplant came from the Saab 900 and Saab 9000 production car.

=== Reynard ===
Reynard launched the Reynard 98E for the 1998 Barber Dodge Pro Series. This car featured a carbon fiber monocoque. The engine came from the second generation Dodge Intrepid. The suspension, brakes and radiators were made by Chrysler. The bodywork was designed using computer-aided drafting (CAD). The car was designed by Andrew Thorby and Adrian Reynard. The car was initially tested at Mallory Park and Snetterton by Rob Wilson. In the USA testing was conducted by Robbie Buhl.

== Series champions ==
Year	Driver	Rookie of the year	Skip Barber Challenge	Car	Engine	Sanctioning body
1986	(United States) Willy Lewis			Mondiale	Saab	IMSA
1987	(United States) Ken Murillo			Mondiale	Saab	IMSA
1988	(United States) Bruce Feldman			Mondiale	Saab	IMSA
1989	(United States) Robbie Buhl			Mondiale	Saab	IMSA
1990	(New Zealand) Rob Wilson			Mondiale	Saab	IMSA
1991	(United States) Bryan Herta			Mondiale	Saab	IMSA
1992	(Sweden) Robert Amren			Mondiale	Saab	IMSA
1993	(Sweden) Kenny Bräck			Mondiale	Saab	IMSA
1994	(Colombia) Diego Guzman			Mondiale	Saab	IMSA
1995	(South Africa) Jaki Scheckter			Mondiale	Dodge	SCCA Pro Racing
1996	(Sweden) Fredrik Larsson	(United States) Derek Hill (United States) Tony Renna		Mondiale	Dodge	SCCA Pro Racing
1997	(United States) Derek Hill	(France) Nicolas Rondet		Mondiale	Dodge	SCCA Pro Racing
1998	(United States) Jeff Simmons	(United States) Jeff Simmons		Reynard 98E	Dodge	SPORTS CAR
1999	(United States) Jeff Simmons	(United States) Roger Yasukawa (United States) Paul Miller		Reynard 98E	Dodge	SPORTS CAR
2000	(Brazil) Nilton Rossoni	(United States) Ryan Hunter-Reay		Reynard 98E	Dodge	SPORTS CAR
2001	(France) Nicolas Rondet	(Brazil) Rafael Sperafico		Reynard 98E	Dodge	CART
2002	(United States) A. J. Allmendinger	(United States) A. J. Allmendinger	(United States) Matt Franc	Reynard 98E	Dodge	CART
2003	(Brazil) Leonardo Maia	(United States) Colin Fleming	(United States) Matt Franc	Reynard 98E	Dodge	CART

Other notable drivers who have raced in the series include Juan Pablo Montoya, Alex Gurney, Jon Fogarty, Ryan Hunter-Reay, Danica Patrick, Jeremy Dale, Townsend Bell, Michael Valiante, David Martínez, Memo Rojas, Rocky Moran, Jr., Al Unser III, Andy Swett, Jerry Nadeau, and Ernesto Viso.
