= Robbie Buhl =

American racing driver (born 1963)

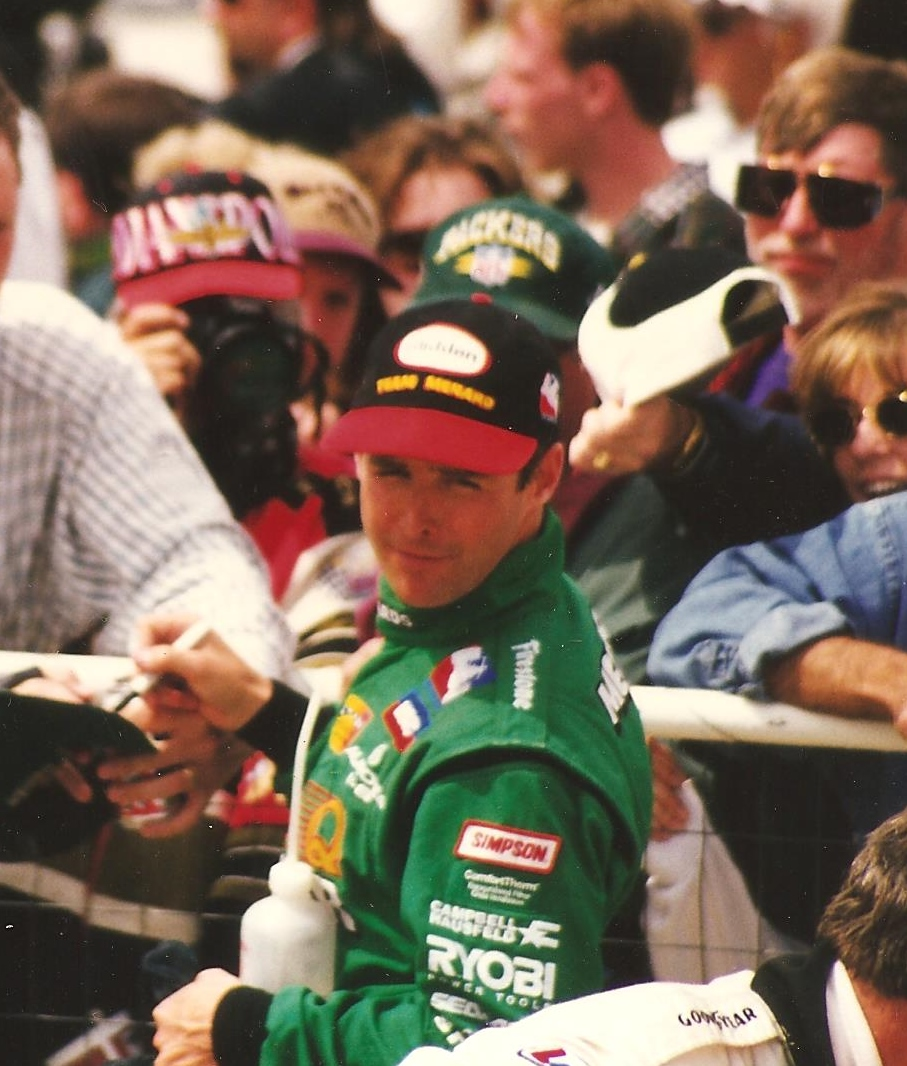
- Buhl at the 1997 Indianapolis 500
- Nationality: American
- Born: September 2, 1963 (age 63) Detroit, Michigan, U.S.
- Retired: 2004

Indy Racing League IndyCar Series
- Years active: 1996–2004
- Teams: Beck Motorsports; Team Menard; Sinden Racing; Tri-Star Racing; Dreyer & Reinbold Racing
- Starts: 78
- Wins: 2
- Poles: 0
- Best finish: 3rd in 1996

Previous series
- 1993–1994 1990–1996 1989: CART World Series; Indy Lights; Barber Saab Pro Series

Championship titles
- 1992 1989: Indy Lights; Barber Saab Pro Series

Robbie Buhl (born September 2, 1963) is an American former race car driver who competed in the Indy Racing League. He was a color commentator for the IndyCar races on Versus. In 2016, Robbie, along with his brother Tom Buhl, started Buhl Sport Detroit, a motorsports marketing company, professional race team, and teen driving program based in Detroit, Michigan.

Buhl's current race team, Racing4Detroit, is the first professional race team based in Detroit, and most recently ran in the 2019 Americas Rallycross Championship. He also created and acts as lead instructor of Teen Street Skills, an advanced teen driver training program also based and operating in Detroit.

Buhl won the 1992 Indy Lights championship and caught the eye of John Menard's Team Menard in 1996, running as team mate to Tony Stewart for two seasons succeeding the late Scott Brayton. He scored his first win in what was once the closest finish in series history when he beat ex-MasterCard Lola F1 driver Vincenzo Sospiri by 0.064 seconds at the New Hampshire International Speedway.

== Personal life ==
Buhl was born in Detroit but his home is Grosse Pointe Farms, Michigan. He is a graduate of Cranbrook School (now Cranbrook Kingswood School) in Bloomfield Hills. His family's wealth stems from nineteenth/early twentieth century manufacturing and real estate development and the industrialization of Detroit in the period 1850-1950. Family holdings included Buhl Stamping, Buhl Aircraft Company, development of vast real estate holdings (including the landmark Buhl Building in downtown Detroit), Parke-Davis (now part of drug giant Pfizer), Buhl Steel (now part of U.S. Steel), Copper and Brass Sales, Inc, (by marriage) and many other holdings. Relatives include former Detroit mayors Christian H. Buhl and Frederick Buhl. His parents reside in Grosse Pointe Farms, Harbor Springs, Michigan, and Hobe Sound, Florida.

On Easter Sunday 1999, Buhl married former racer Scott Brayton's widow Becky.

Buhl is a Founder and key Supporter of "Racing for Kids", a charitable foundation established to assist chronically ill children. He makes a point of visiting sick children at hospitals on each stop of the circuit, bringing a bit of cheer to their lives in the process.

In 2007, Buhl began a broadcasting career, joining the broadcast booth for the Indy Pro Series, now the Indy NXT by Firestone Series, alongside veteran broadcaster Bob Jenkins. He would join Jenkins and Jon Beekhuis in the Versus broadcast booth for the 2009 IndyCar Series. It was announced on the Izod Indycar Series website he was let go by Versus for the network's IndyCar coverage and will be replaced by Wally Dallenbach Jr., who is also a color commentator for TNT's NASCAR coverage.

== Career results ==
=== American Open Wheel Racing results ===
(key) (Races in bold indicate pole position)

==== American Racing Series / Indy Lights ====
Year	Team	1	2	3	4	5	6	7	8	9	10	11	12	13	14	Rank	Points
1990	Leading Edge Motorsport	PHX; 22	LBH; 13	**MIL**; 2	DET; 18	POR; 9	CLE; 6	MEA; 4	TOR; 11	DEN; 2	VAN; 6	**MDO**; 2	ROA; 2	**NAZ**; 2	LS; 16	**4th**	**118**
1991	Leading Edge Motorsport	LBH; 2	PHX; 8	MIL; 9	DET; 4	POR; 6	CLE; 5	MEA; 3	TOR; 2	DEN; 11	**MDO**; 14	NAZ; 1	**LS**; 17			**6th**	**110**
1992	Leading Edge Motorsport	PHX; 3	LBH; 3	DET; 2	POR; 2	MIL; 3	NHA; 3	TOR; 2	**CLE**; 3	**VAN**; 2	MDO; 3	**NAZ**; 1	LS; 4			**1st**	**186**
1995	Dorricott Racing	MIA; 4	PHX; 2	LBH; 2	NAZ; 3	**MIL**; 4	**DET**; 1	POR; 12	TOR; 2	CLE; 22	**NHA**; 3	VAN; 3	LS; 21			**2nd**	**140**
1996	FRE Racing	MIA	LBH	NAZ	MIS	MIL	DET	POR	CLE	TOR; 11	TRO	VAN	LS			**26th**	**2**

==== CART ====
Year	Team	Chassis	Engine	1	2	3	4	5	6	7	8	9	10	11	12	13	14	15	16	Rank	Points	Ref
1993	Dale Coyne Racing	Lola T92/00	Chevrolet 265A V8t	SRF; 23	PHX; 19	LBH; 6		MIL; 17	DET; 28	POR	CLE; 24	TOR	MIC	NHA	ROA; 19	VAN	MDO; 14	NAZ; 17	LS; 16	**21st**	**6**	
1993	Dale Coyne Racing	Lola T92/00	Buick 3300 V6t				INDY; DNQ													**21st**	**6**	
1994	Dale Coyne Racing	Lola T93/00	Ford XB V8t	SRF; 20	PHX	LBH; 16	INDY	MIL	DET	POR	CLE	TOR	MIC	MDO	NHA	VAN	ROA	NAZ	LS	**41st**	**0**	

==== IRL IndyCar Series ====
Year	Team	Chassis	No.	Engine	1	2	3	4	5	6	7	8	9	10	11	12	13	14	15	16	Rank	Points	Ref
1996	Beck Motorsports	Reynard 94i1 Lola T942	54	Ford XB V8t	WDW; 3		INDY; 9														3rd	240	
1996	Zunne Group Racing	Lola T94	54	Ford XB V8t		PHX; 13															3rd	240	
1996-1997	Beck Motorsports	Lola T94/00	54	Ford XB V8t	NHM; 22	LVS; 8	WDW														13th	170	
1996-1997	Team Menard	G-Force GF01	3	Oldsmobile Aurora V8				PHX; 18	INDY; 8	TXS; 16	PPI	CLT	NH2; 1	LV2; 3							13th	170	
1998	Team Menard	G-Force GF01B	3	Oldsmobile Aurora V8	WDW; 20																17th	174	
1998	Team Menard	Dallara IR8	3	Oldsmobile Aurora V8		PHX; 12	INDY; 31	TXS; 6	NHM; 10	DOV	CLT	PPI; 2	ATL; 11	TX2; 7	LVS; 7						17th	174	
1999	Sinden Racing	Dallara IR9	44	Infiniti VRH35ADE V8	WDW; 20	PHX; 3	CLT; C	INDY; Wth													22nd	114	
1999	A. J. Foyt Enterprises	Dallara IR9	84	Oldsmobile Aurora V8				INDY; 6	TXS	PPI	ATL	DOV	PP2								22nd	114	
1999	Tri-Star Motorsports	Dallara IR9	22	Oldsmobile Aurora V8										LVS; 3	TX2; 24						22nd	114	
2000	Dreyer & Reinbold Racing	G-Force GF05	24	Oldsmobile Aurora V8	WDW; 1	PHX; 7	LVS; 5	INDY; 26													8th	190	
2000	Dreyer & Reinbold Racing	G-Force GF05	24	Infiniti VRH35ADE V8					TXS; 18	PPI; 23	ATL; 6	KTY; 13	TX2; 18								8th	190	
2001	Dreyer & Reinbold Racing	G-Force GF05B	24	Infiniti VRH35ADE V8	PHX; 11	HMS; 24	ATL; 20	INDY; 15	TXS; 21	PPI; 3	RIR; 9	KAN; 21	NSH; 13	KTY; 9	STL; 5	CHI; 22	TX2; 3				12th	237	
2002	Dreyer & Reinbold Racing	G-Force GF05C	24	Infiniti VRH35ADE V8	HMS; 12	PHX; 13	FON; DNS	NZR	INDY; 16	TXS; 20	PPI; 23	RIR; 13	KAN; 21	NSH; 21	MIS; 24	KTY; 10	STL; 6	CHI; 20	TX2; 18		17th	177	
2003	Dreyer & Reinbold Racing	Dallara IR-03	24	Chevrolet Indy V8	HMS; 19	PHX; 12	MOT; 10	INDY; 23	TXS; 22	PPI; 15	RIR; 15	KAN; 12	NSH; 21	MIS; 13	STL; 12	KTY; 7	NZR; 9	CHI; 10	FON; 12	TX2; 11	14th	261	
2004	Dreyer & Reinbold Racing	Dallara IR-04	24	Chevrolet Indy V8	HMS; 10	PHX; 18	MOT; 21	INDY	TXS	RIR	KAN	NSH	MIL	MIS	KTY	PPI	NZR	CHI	FON	TX2	24th	44	

Years	Teams	Races	Poles	Wins	Podiums (Non-win)	Top 10s (Non-podium)	Indianapolis 500 Wins	Championships
9	6	78	0	2	7	19	0	0

==== Indianapolis 500 ====
Year	Chassis	Engine	Start	Finish	Team
1993	Lola T92/00	Buick 3300 V6t	Practice Crash		Dale Coyne Racing
1996	Lola T94/00	Ford-Cosworth XB V8t	23	9	Beck Motorsports
1997	G-Force GF01	Oldsmobile Aurora V8	4	8	Team Menard
1998	Dallara IR8	Oldsmobile Aurora V8	5	31	Team Menard
1999	Dallara IR9	Oldsmobile Aurora V8	32	6	A. J. Foyt Enterprises
2000	G-Force GF05	Oldsmobile Aurora V8	9	26	Dreyer & Reinbold Racing
2001	G-Force GF05B	Infiniti VRH35ADE V8	9	15	Dreyer & Reinbold Racing
2002	G-Force GF05C	Infiniti VRH35ADE V8	2	16	Dreyer & Reinbold Racing
2003	Dallara IR-03	Chevrolet Indy V8	22	23	Dreyer & Reinbold Racing

Sporting positions
Preceded by Bruce Feldman	Barber Saab Pro Series Champion; 1989	Succeeded by Rob Wilson
Preceded by Éric Bachelart	Indy Lights Champion; 1992	Succeeded by Bryan Herta
