= Harald Huysman =

Norwegian racing driver

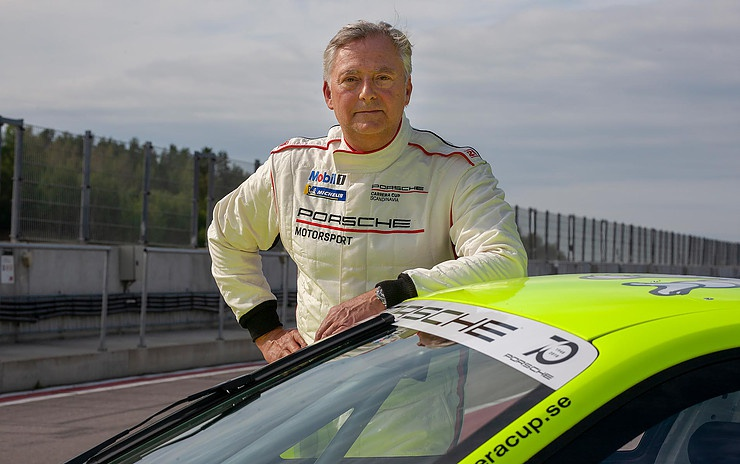
- Huysman at the Porsche Carrera Cup Scandinavia 2018
- Born: 7 January 1959 (age 67); Fredrikstad, Norway
- Occupations: Race Car Driver, Athlete Manager & Business Person
- Years active: 1978 - 1994
- Employer(s): Brun Motorsport, Porsche
- Known for: 24 Hours of Le Mans, Rudskogen, Jenson Button, Kimi Räikkönen, Porsche Supercup

Harald Huysman (born 7 January 1959) is a former racing driver from Norway of Belgian descent.

Huysman competed in FF1600 (Formula Ford) in which he won the Benelux and European championships, F3, World Sports Car Championship and Le Mans as well as Indy Lights, Toyota Atlantic, Barber Saab Pro Series and the Porsche Supercup.

Since ending his own driving career, Huysman has part of the management team of Jenson Button and more recently a number of other junior racing talents, including fellow Norwegian Dennis Hauger. He also discovered and helped Kimi Räikkönen enter Formula One. He previously ran a karting facility in Oslo and has developed a portfolio of motoring business interests, including a BMW dealership in Oslo, importing Porsches to Norway and organising corporate events. Huysman is the majority shareholder in Rudskogen race circuit, Norway's national motorsport facility, which underwent significant development (Michael Schumacher is also a shareholder).

Huysman has also been a Formula 1 commentator for Norwegian TV.

== Racing record ==
=== 24 Hours of Le Mans results ===
Year	Team	Co-Drivers	Car	Class	Laps	Pos.	Class Pos.
1989	(Switzerland) Brun Motorsport	(West Germany) Uwe Schäfer (France) Dominique Lacaud	Porsche 962C	C1	351	10th	8th
1990	(Switzerland) Brun Motorsport	(Italy) Massimo Sigala (Switzerland) Bernard Santal	Porsche 962C	C1	335	10th	10th
1991	(Switzerland) Repsol Brun Motorsport	(Canada) Robbie Stirling (Switzerland) Bernard Santal	Porsche 962C	C2	138	DNF	DNF

=== Indy Lights ===
Year	Team	1	2	3	4	5	6	7	8	9	10	11	12	Rank	Points	Ref
1993	Tasman Motorsports	PHX; 7	LBH; 8	MIL; 6	DET; 6	POR; Ret	CLE; 7	TOR; 7	NHA; 3	VAN; 7	MDO; 7	NAZ; 10	LS; 14	8th	68	
