= 2000 24 Hours of Daytona =

Previous: 1999	Next: 2001
Index: Races | Winners

Track map of Daytona International Speedway

The 2000 Rolex 24 at Daytona was a Grand-Am Rolex Sports Car Series 24-hour endurance sports car race held on February 5–6, 2000 at the Daytona International Speedway road course. The event was the first round of the inaugural Rolex Sports Car Series season. Victory overall and in the GTO class went to the No. 91 Viper Team Oreca Dodge Viper GTS-R piloted by Olivier Beretta, Karl Wendlinger, and Dominique Dupuy. Victory in the SR class went to the No. 20 Dyson Racing Riley & Scott Mk III piloted by James Weaver, Rob Dyson, Max Papis, and Elliott Forbes-Robinson. Victory in the GTU category went to the No. 56 Haberthur Racing Porsche 996 GT3-R piloted by Luca Drudi, Gabrio Rosa, Fabio Rosa, and Fabio Babini. Finally, the AGT class was won by the No. 84 Comer Racing, Inc. Chevrolet Camaro piloted by John Finger, Doug Mills, Richard Maugeri, Andy McNeil, and Ronald Zitza.

== Race results ==
Class winners in bold.

Pos	Class	No	Team	Drivers	Chassis	Tire	Laps
Pos	Class	No	Team	Drivers	Engine	Tire	Laps
1	**GTO**	**91**	**(France) Viper Team Oreca**	**(Monaco) Olivier Beretta (Austria) Karl Wendlinger (France) Dominique Dupuy**	**Dodge Viper GTS-R**	**M**	**723**
1	**GTO**	**91**	**(France) Viper Team Oreca**	**(Monaco) Olivier Beretta (Austria) Karl Wendlinger (France) Dominique Dupuy**	**Dodge 8.0 L V10**	**M**	**723**
2	GTO	3	(United States) Corvette Racing	(Canada) Ron Fellows (United Kingdom) Justin Bell (United States) Chris Kneifel	Chevrolet Corvette C5-R	**G**	723
2	GTO	3	(United States) Corvette Racing	(Canada) Ron Fellows (United Kingdom) Justin Bell (United States) Chris Kneifel	Chevrolet LS1 7.0 L V8	**G**	723
3	GTO	93	(France) Viper Team Oreca	(United States) David Donohue (Portugal) Ni Amorim (France) Jean-Philippe Belloc (United States) Tommy Archer	Dodge Viper GTS-R	**M**	719
3	GTO	93	(France) Viper Team Oreca	(United States) David Donohue (Portugal) Ni Amorim (France) Jean-Philippe Belloc (United States) Tommy Archer	Dodge 8.0 L V10	**M**	719
4	**SR**	**20**	**(United States) Dyson Racing**	**(United Kingdom) James Weaver (United States) Rob Dyson (Italy) Max Papis (United States) Elliott Forbes-Robinson**	**Riley & Scott Mk III**	**G**	**717**
4	**SR**	**20**	**(United States) Dyson Racing**	**(United Kingdom) James Weaver (United States) Rob Dyson (Italy) Max Papis (United States) Elliott Forbes-Robinson**	**Ford-Lincoln 5.5 L V8**	**G**	**717**
5	GTO	92	(France) Viper Team Oreca	(United States) Tommy Archer (Belgium) Marc Duez (Belgium) Vincent Vosse (France) Jean-Philippe Belloc	Dodge Viper GTS-R	**M**	691
5	GTO	92	(France) Viper Team Oreca	(United States) Tommy Archer (Belgium) Marc Duez (Belgium) Vincent Vosse (France) Jean-Philippe Belloc	Dodge 8.0 L V10	**M**	691
6	GTO	45	(United States) Team Viper West	(South Africa) Stephen Watson (United Kingdom) Christian Vann (Italy) Raffaele Sangiuolo (United States) Allison Duncan	Dodge Viper GTS-R	**D**	665
6	GTO	45	(United States) Team Viper West	(South Africa) Stephen Watson (United Kingdom) Christian Vann (Italy) Raffaele Sangiuolo (United States) Allison Duncan	Dodge 8.0 L V10	**D**	665
7	GTO	46	(United States) Team Viper West	(Switzerland) Toni Seiler (United States) Erik Messley (Switzerland) Walter Brun (Netherlands) Hans Hugenholtz	Dodge Viper GTS-R	**D**	659
7	GTO	46	(United States) Team Viper West	(Switzerland) Toni Seiler (United States) Erik Messley (Switzerland) Walter Brun (Netherlands) Hans Hugenholtz	Dodge 8.0 L V10	**D**	659
8	**GTU**	**56**	**(Switzerland) Haberthur Racing**	**(Italy) Luca Drudi (Italy) Gabrio Rosa (Italy) Fabio Rosa (Italy) Fabio Babini**	**Porsche 996 GT3-R**	**P**	**658**
8	**GTU**	**56**	**(Switzerland) Haberthur Racing**	**(Italy) Luca Drudi (Italy) Gabrio Rosa (Italy) Fabio Rosa (Italy) Fabio Babini**	**Porsche 3.6 L Flat-6**	**P**	**658**
9	GTO	72	(Germany) Freisinger Motorsport	(Germany) Wolfgang Kaufmann (Germany) Ernst Palmberger (United States) Lance Stewart	Porsche 911 GT2	**D**	657
9	GTO	72	(Germany) Freisinger Motorsport	(Germany) Wolfgang Kaufmann (Germany) Ernst Palmberger (United States) Lance Stewart	Porsche 3.8 L Flat-6	**D**	657
10	GTU	7	(Germany) RWS Motorsport	(Austria) Dieter Quester (Austria) Philipp Peter (Belgium) Hans Willems (Austria) Hans-Jörg Hofer (Italy) Luca Riccitelli	Porsche 996 GT3-R	**M**	657
10	GTU	7	(Germany) RWS Motorsport	(Austria) Dieter Quester (Austria) Philipp Peter (Belgium) Hans Willems (Austria) Hans-Jörg Hofer (Italy) Luca Riccitelli	Porsche 3.6 L Flat-6	**M**	657
11	GTO	99	(United States) Schumacher Racing	(United States) Martin Snow (United States) John O'Steen (United States) Stu Hayner (United States) Larry Schumacher	Porsche 911 GT2	**M** **D** **P**	654
11	GTO	99	(United States) Schumacher Racing	(United States) Martin Snow (United States) John O'Steen (United States) Stu Hayner (United States) Larry Schumacher	Porsche 3.8 L Flat-6 Turbo	**M** **D** **P**	654
12	GTU	07	(United States) G&W Motorsports	(United States) Mike Fitzgerald (United States) Greg Merril (United States) Steve Marshall (United States) Danny Marshall (United States) Chris MacAllister (United States) Darren Law	Porsche 993 Carrera RSR	**P**	651
12	GTU	07	(United States) G&W Motorsports	(United States) Mike Fitzgerald (United States) Greg Merril (United States) Steve Marshall (United States) Danny Marshall (United States) Chris MacAllister (United States) Darren Law	Porsche 3.6 L Flat-6	**P**	651
13 DNF	SR	6	(United States) Team Cadillac	(United States) Butch Leitzinger (United Kingdom) Andy Wallace (France) Franck Lagorce	Cadillac Northstar LMP	**P**	637
13 DNF	SR	6	(United States) Team Cadillac	(United States) Butch Leitzinger (United Kingdom) Andy Wallace (France) Franck Lagorce	Cadillac Northstar 4.0 L V8	**P**	637
14	SR	5	(United States) Team Cadillac	(South Africa) Wayne Taylor (Italy) Max Angelelli (Belgium) Eric van de Poele	Cadillac Northstar LMP	**P**	637
14	SR	5	(United States) Team Cadillac	(South Africa) Wayne Taylor (Italy) Max Angelelli (Belgium) Eric van de Poele	Cadillac Northstar 4.0 L V8	**P**	637
15	GTU	67	(United States) Westward Ho Casino/The Racer's Group	(United States) Wade Gaughran (United States) Philip Collin (United States) Dale White (United States) Kevin Buckler (United States) Michael Petersen	Porsche 996 GT3-R	**P**	623
15	GTU	67	(United States) Westward Ho Casino/The Racer's Group	(United States) Wade Gaughran (United States) Philip Collin (United States) Dale White (United States) Kevin Buckler (United States) Michael Petersen	Porsche 3.6 L Flat-6	**P**	623
16 DNF	GTU	23	(United States) Alex Job Racing	(United States) Randy Pobst (Belgium) Bruno Lambert (United States) Mike Conte	Porsche 996 GT3-R	**M**	620
16 DNF	GTU	23	(United States) Alex Job Racing	(United States) Randy Pobst (Belgium) Bruno Lambert (United States) Mike Conte	Porsche 3.6 L Flat-6	**M**	620
17	GTU	66	(United States) Team Seattle/The Racer's Group	(United States) Don Kitch Jr. (United States) Steve Miller (Japan) Kiichi Takahashi (United States) Dave Gaylord	Porsche 996 GT3-R	**P**	617
17	GTU	66	(United States) Team Seattle/The Racer's Group	(United States) Don Kitch Jr. (United States) Steve Miller (Japan) Kiichi Takahashi (United States) Dave Gaylord	Porsche 3.6 L Flat-6	**P**	617
18	GTU	41	(Switzerland) L. R. Organisation	(United Kingdom) Peter Hardman (Switzerland) Philippe Favre (Belgium) Stanislas De Sadeleer (Germany) Nicolaus Springer	Porsche 996 GT3-R	**D**	606
18	GTU	41	(Switzerland) L. R. Organisation	(United Kingdom) Peter Hardman (Switzerland) Philippe Favre (Belgium) Stanislas De Sadeleer (Germany) Nicolaus Springer	Porsche 3.6 L Flat-6	**D**	606
19	GTO	73	(Germany) Freisinger Motorsport	(Germany) Ulrich Gallade (Australia) Ray Lintott (Austria) Manfred Jurasz (Germany) Klaus Horn (United States) Allan Ziegelman	Porsche 911 GT2	**D**	604
19	GTO	73	(Germany) Freisinger Motorsport	(Germany) Ulrich Gallade (Australia) Ray Lintott (Austria) Manfred Jurasz (Germany) Klaus Horn (United States) Allan Ziegelman	Porsche 3.8 L Flat-6 Turbo	**D**	604
20 DNF	GTU	90	(France) Larbre Compétition	(France) Christophe Bouchut (Germany) André Ahrlé (France) Jean-Luc Chéreau (France) Patrice Goueslard	Porsche 996 GT3-R	**M**	597
20 DNF	GTU	90	(France) Larbre Compétition	(France) Christophe Bouchut (Germany) André Ahrlé (France) Jean-Luc Chéreau (France) Patrice Goueslard	Porsche 3.6 L Flat-6	**M**	597
21	GTU	62	(United States) Safina Racing	(United States) Hugh Plumb (United States) Mark Hillestad (United States) Carlos de Quesada (United States) Ross Bluestein (United States) Joseph Safina	BMW M3 E36	**P**	597
21	GTU	62	(United States) Safina Racing	(United States) Hugh Plumb (United States) Mark Hillestad (United States) Carlos de Quesada (United States) Ross Bluestein (United States) Joseph Safina	BMW 3.2 L I6	**P**	597
22	GTU	97	(United States) Schmidt Brothers	(United States) Max Schmidt (United States) Rusty Schmidt (United States) Jeff Conkel (United States) Bob Woodman	Porsche 911 Carrera RSR	**P**	594
22	GTU	97	(United States) Schmidt Brothers	(United States) Max Schmidt (United States) Rusty Schmidt (United States) Jeff Conkel (United States) Bob Woodman	Porsche 3.6 L Flat-6	**P**	594
23	SR	36	(United States) Johansson-Matthews Racing	(Sweden) Stefan Johansson (United Kingdom) Guy Smith (United States) Jim Matthews (United States) Memo Gidley	Reynard 2KQ	**Y**	576
23	SR	36	(United States) Johansson-Matthews Racing	(Sweden) Stefan Johansson (United Kingdom) Guy Smith (United States) Jim Matthews (United States) Memo Gidley	Judd 4.0 L V10	**Y**	576
24 DNF	GTO	4	(United States) Corvette Racing	(United States) Kelly Collins (United States) Andy Pilgrim (France) Franck Fréon	Chevrolet Corvette C5-R	**G**	573
24 DNF	GTO	4	(United States) Corvette Racing	(United States) Kelly Collins (United States) Andy Pilgrim (France) Franck Fréon	Chevrolet LS1 7.0 L V8	**G**	573
25	GTU	58	(Italy) MAC Racing	(Italy) Massimo Morini (Italy) Antonio De Castro (Italy) Luca Cattaneo (Italy) Renato Bicciato (Italy) Massimo Frigerio	Porsche 996 GT3-R	**P**	570
25	GTU	58	(Italy) MAC Racing	(Italy) Massimo Morini (Italy) Antonio De Castro (Italy) Luca Cattaneo (Italy) Renato Bicciato (Italy) Massimo Frigerio	Porsche 3.6 L Flat-6	**P**	570
26	GTU	34	(United States) Autohaus Harrisburg, Inc.	(United States) Spencer Pumpelly (United States) Emil Assentato (United States) John Steinmetz (United Kingdom) Gregor Fisken	Porsche 993 Carrera RSR	**G**	549
26	GTU	34	(United States) Autohaus Harrisburg, Inc.	(United States) Spencer Pumpelly (United States) Emil Assentato (United States) John Steinmetz (United Kingdom) Gregor Fisken	Porsche 3.8 L Flat-6	**G**	549
27	**AGT**	**84**	**(United States) Comer Racing, Inc.**	**(United States) John Finger (United States) Doug Mills (United States) Richard Maugeri (United States) Andy McNeil (United States) Ronald Zitza**	**Chevrolet Camaro**	**P**	**546**
27	**AGT**	**84**	**(United States) Comer Racing, Inc.**	**(United States) John Finger (United States) Doug Mills (United States) Richard Maugeri (United States) Andy McNeil (United States) Ronald Zitza**	**Chevrolet 6.0 L V8**	**P**	**546**
28 DNF	GTU	10	(Germany) Jurgen/Alzen Motorsport	(Germany) Ulli Richter (Germany) Wilhelm Kern (Germany) Axel Rohr (Germany) Jürgen Alzen	Porsche 996 GT3-R	**P**	542
28 DNF	GTU	10	(Germany) Jurgen/Alzen Motorsport	(Germany) Ulli Richter (Germany) Wilhelm Kern (Germany) Axel Rohr (Germany) Jürgen Alzen	Porsche 3.6 L Flat-6	**P**	542
29 DNF	GTU	44	(United Kingdom) PK Sport	(United Kingdom) Peter Chambers (United Kingdom) Paul Fuller (United Kingdom) Mike Youles (United Kingdom) Marcus Fothergill (United Kingdom) Adam Simmons	Porsche 996 GT3-R	**D**	542
29 DNF	GTU	44	(United Kingdom) PK Sport	(United Kingdom) Peter Chambers (United Kingdom) Paul Fuller (United Kingdom) Mike Youles (United Kingdom) Marcus Fothergill (United Kingdom) Adam Simmons	Porsche 3.6 L Flat-6	**D**	542
30 DNF	GTU	2	(United States) MCR/Aspen Knolls	(United States) Shane Lewis (United States) Bob Mazzuoccola (United States) Mike Bavaro (United States) Cort Wagner	Porsche 996 GT3-R	**P**	540
30 DNF	GTU	2	(United States) MCR/Aspen Knolls	(United States) Shane Lewis (United States) Bob Mazzuoccola (United States) Mike Bavaro (United States) Cort Wagner	Porsche 3.6 L Flat-6	**P**	540
31 DNF	GTU	81	(United States) G&W Motorsports	(Germany) Uwe Alzen (Netherlands) Duncan Huisman (Netherlands) Patrick Huisman (United States) Darren Law	Porsche 996 GT3-R	**M**	525
31 DNF	GTU	81	(United States) G&W Motorsports	(Germany) Uwe Alzen (Netherlands) Duncan Huisman (Netherlands) Patrick Huisman (United States) Darren Law	Porsche 3.6 L Flat-6	**M**	525
32	GTU	01	(United States) Reiser Callas Rennsport	(United States) Grady Willingham (United States) Chris Pennington (Canada) Joel Reiser (Italy) Simon Sobrero (United States) Craig Stanton	Porsche 996 GT3-R	**Y**	523
32	GTU	01	(United States) Reiser Callas Rennsport	(United States) Grady Willingham (United States) Chris Pennington (Canada) Joel Reiser (Italy) Simon Sobrero (United States) Craig Stanton	Porsche 3.6 L Flat-6	**Y**	523
33	SR	47	(United States) RaceStar Motorsports	(United States) Richard McDill (United States) Todd Vallancourt (United States) John G. Thomas (United States) Les Vallarano (United States) Ken Stiver	Spice SE90	**P**	522
33	SR	47	(United States) RaceStar Motorsports	(United States) Richard McDill (United States) Todd Vallancourt (United States) John G. Thomas (United States) Les Vallarano (United States) Ken Stiver	Chevrolet 5.0 L V8	**P**	522
34	GTU	57	(Switzerland) Haberthur Racing	(France) Jean-Luc Maury-Laribière (France) Pascal Fabre (France) Bernard Chauvin (France) Patrick Cruchet (France) Claude Vorilhon	Porsche 996 GT3-R	**D**	519
34	GTU	57	(Switzerland) Haberthur Racing	(France) Jean-Luc Maury-Laribière (France) Pascal Fabre (France) Bernard Chauvin (France) Patrick Cruchet (France) Claude Vorilhon	Porsche 3.6 L Flat-6	**D**	519
35	SR	74	(United States) 74 Ranch Resort	(United States) George Robinson (United States) Jack Baldwin (United States) Hurley Haywood (United States) Irv Hoerr	Riley & Scott Mk III	**G**	495
35	SR	74	(United States) 74 Ranch Resort	(United States) George Robinson (United States) Jack Baldwin (United States) Hurley Haywood (United States) Irv Hoerr	Chevrolet 6.0 L V8	**G**	495
36 DNF	GTU	88	(United States) MCR/Nygmatech	(United States) Peter Baron (United States) Gian Luigi Buitoni (United States) Tony Kester (United States) Leo Hindery (United States) Mike Borkowski	Porsche 996 GT3-R	**P**	470
36 DNF	GTU	88	(United States) MCR/Nygmatech	(United States) Peter Baron (United States) Gian Luigi Buitoni (United States) Tony Kester (United States) Leo Hindery (United States) Mike Borkowski	Porsche 3.6 L Flat-6	**P**	470
37 DNF	GTU	22	(Germany) Seikel Motorsport	(United States) Kurt Matthewson (Canada) Tony Burgess (Italy) Paolo Rapetti (Belgium) Michel Neugarten	Porsche 996 GT3-R	**D**	443
37 DNF	GTU	22	(Germany) Seikel Motorsport	(United States) Kurt Matthewson (Canada) Tony Burgess (Italy) Paolo Rapetti (Belgium) Michel Neugarten	Porsche 3.6 L Flat-6	**D**	443
38	GTO	38	(Germany) Proton Competition	(Austria) Horst Felbermayr (Austria) Horst Felbermayr Jr. (Germany) Christian Ried (Germany) Gerold Ried	Porsche 911 GT2	**Y**	405
38	GTO	38	(Germany) Proton Competition	(Austria) Horst Felbermayr (Austria) Horst Felbermayr Jr. (Germany) Christian Ried (Germany) Gerold Ried	Porsche 3.6 L Flat-6 Turbo	**Y**	405
39 DNF	GTU	70	(Australia) Skea Racing International	(United States) David Murry (United States) Lloyd Hawkins (Australia) Rohan Skea (United Kingdom) Johnny Mowlem	Porsche 996 GT3-R	**P**	400
39 DNF	GTU	70	(Australia) Skea Racing International	(United States) David Murry (United States) Lloyd Hawkins (Australia) Rohan Skea (United Kingdom) Johnny Mowlem	Porsche 3.6 L Flat-6	**P**	400
40 DNF	AGT	09	(United States) Spirit of Daytona Racing	(United States) Craig Conway (United States) Troy Flis (United States) Todd Flis (United States) Doug Goad	Chevrolet Camaro	**P**	397
40 DNF	AGT	09	(United States) Spirit of Daytona Racing	(United States) Craig Conway (United States) Troy Flis (United States) Todd Flis (United States) Doug Goad	Chevrolet 5.9 L V8	**P**	397
41	SR	95	(United States) TRV Motorsports	(United States) Barry Waddell (United States) Peter Boss (United States) R. J. Valentine (United States) Tom Volk	Riley & Scott Mk III	**G**	380
41	SR	95	(United States) TRV Motorsports	(United States) Barry Waddell (United States) Peter Boss (United States) R. J. Valentine (United States) Tom Volk	Chevrolet 5.0 L V8	**G**	380
42 DNF	GTU	68	(United States) The Racer's Group	(United States) Ron Herrerias (United States) Mike Smith (United States) Tom McGlynn (Italy) Ludovico Manfredi (United States) Kevin Buckler	Porsche 911 Carrera RSR	**P** **G**	373
42 DNF	GTU	68	(United States) The Racer's Group	(United States) Ron Herrerias (United States) Mike Smith (United States) Tom McGlynn (Italy) Ludovico Manfredi (United States) Kevin Buckler	Porsche 3.6 L Flat-6	**P** **G**	373
43 DNF	SR	17	(United States) Hybrid Motorsports	(United States) Chris Bingham (United States) Boris Said (United States) Mark Simo (United States) Rick Sutherland	Riley & Scott Mk III	**Y**	352
43 DNF	SR	17	(United States) Hybrid Motorsports	(United States) Chris Bingham (United States) Boris Said (United States) Mark Simo (United States) Rick Sutherland	Ford 5.1 L V8	**Y**	352
44 DNF	GTU	33	(Italy) MAC Racing	(Belgium) Marc Schoonbroodt (Italy) Luciano Tamburini (Italy) Franco Bugané (United States) Kurt Thiel (Italy) Roberto Bonuomo	Porsche 996 GT3-R	**P**	321
44 DNF	GTU	33	(Italy) MAC Racing	(Belgium) Marc Schoonbroodt (Italy) Luciano Tamburini (Italy) Franco Bugané (United States) Kurt Thiel (Italy) Roberto Bonuomo	Porsche 3.6 L Flat-6	**P**	321
45 DNF	GTU	59	(United States) Brumos Racing	(Germany) Jürgen Barth (France) Roland Bervillé (France) Michel Ligonnet (France) Ferdinand de Lesseps	Porsche 996 GT3-R	**M**	314
45 DNF	GTU	59	(United States) Brumos Racing	(Germany) Jürgen Barth (France) Roland Bervillé (France) Michel Ligonnet (France) Ferdinand de Lesseps	Porsche 3.6 L Flat-6	**M**	314
46 DNF	GTU	51	(United States) Dick Barbour Racing	(Germany) Dirk Müller (France) Bob Wollek (Germany) Lucas Luhr	Porsche 996 GT3-R	**M**	312
46 DNF	GTU	51	(United States) Dick Barbour Racing	(Germany) Dirk Müller (France) Bob Wollek (Germany) Lucas Luhr	Porsche 3.6 L Flat-6	**M**	312
47 DNF	GTU	50	(United States) Genesis Racing	(United States) Bill Auberlen (United States) Rick Fairbanks (United States) Nick Ham (United States) Chris Gleason	BMW M3 E36	**Y**	312
47 DNF	GTU	50	(United States) Genesis Racing	(United States) Bill Auberlen (United States) Rick Fairbanks (United States) Nick Ham (United States) Chris Gleason	BMW 3.2 L I6	**Y**	312
48 DNF	SR	63	(United States) Downing/Atlanta Racing	(United States) Howard Katz (United States) Chris Ronson (United States) Steve Pelke (United States) Jim Downing (United States) Rich Grupp	Kudzu DLY	**G**	303
48 DNF	SR	63	(United States) Downing/Atlanta Racing	(United States) Howard Katz (United States) Chris Ronson (United States) Steve Pelke (United States) Jim Downing (United States) Rich Grupp	Mazda 4-Rotor	**G**	303
49 DNF	AGT	53	(United States) Diablo Racing	(United States) Tom Scheuren (United States) Eric Curran (United States) Rick Dilorio (United States) Todd Snyder (United States) Mayo T. Smith	Chevrolet Camaro	**G**	303
49 DNF	AGT	53	(United States) Diablo Racing	(United States) Tom Scheuren (United States) Eric Curran (United States) Rick Dilorio (United States) Todd Snyder (United States) Mayo T. Smith	Chevrolet 5.1 L V8	**G**	303
50 DNF	SR	9	(United States) Bobby Brown Motorsports	(United States) Bobby Brown (United States) Norman Goldrich (United States) Randy Lenz (United States) Brian DeVries	Spice HC94	**P**	292
50 DNF	SR	9	(United States) Bobby Brown Motorsports	(United States) Bobby Brown (United States) Norman Goldrich (United States) Randy Lenz (United States) Brian DeVries	Chevrolet 5.0 L V8	**P**	292
51 DNF	AGT	13	(United States) DM Motorsports	(United States) Martin Shuster (United States) Mark Montgomery (United States) Anthony Puleo	Chevrolet Camaro	**G**	289
51 DNF	AGT	13	(United States) DM Motorsports	(United States) Martin Shuster (United States) Mark Montgomery (United States) Anthony Puleo	Chevrolet 6.0 L V8	**G**	289
52 DNF	GTO	48	(Switzerland) Haberthur Racing	(Italy) Mauro Casadei (Italy) Stefano Bucci (Italy) Andrea Garbagnati (Italy) Renato Mastropietro	Porsche 911 GT2	**D**	279
52 DNF	GTO	48	(Switzerland) Haberthur Racing	(Italy) Mauro Casadei (Italy) Stefano Bucci (Italy) Andrea Garbagnati (Italy) Renato Mastropietro	Porsche 3.8 L Flat-6 Turbo	**D**	279
53	SR	60	(United States) Jacobs Motorsports	(United States) Steven Lynn (United States) Ray Snowdon (United States) Steve Algrin (United States) Richard Geck (United States) Michael Jacobs (United States) Frank Del Vecchio	Kudzu DLM-4	**P**	277
53	SR	60	(United States) Jacobs Motorsports	(United States) Steven Lynn (United States) Ray Snowdon (United States) Steve Algrin (United States) Richard Geck (United States) Michael Jacobs (United States) Frank Del Vecchio	Chevrolet 5.1 L V8	**P**	277
54 DNF	GTO	14	(United States) Jack Cauley Chevrolet	(United States) R. K. Smith (United States) Jeff Norwicki (United States) Bill Lester (United States) John Heinricy	Chevrolet Corvette C5-R	**P**	261
54 DNF	GTO	14	(United States) Jack Cauley Chevrolet	(United States) R. K. Smith (United States) Jeff Norwicki (United States) Bill Lester (United States) John Heinricy	Chevrolet 7.0 L V8	**P**	261
55 DNF	GTO	03	(Germany) Roock Racing	(Germany) Claudia Hürtgen (Germany) Hubert Haupt (Japan) Hisashi Wada (United Kingdom) Robert Nearn (United Kingdom) Nigel Smith (United States) Stephen Earle	Porsche 911 GT2	**Y**	259
55 DNF	GTO	03	(Germany) Roock Racing	(Germany) Claudia Hürtgen (Germany) Hubert Haupt (Japan) Hisashi Wada (United Kingdom) Robert Nearn (United Kingdom) Nigel Smith (United States) Stephen Earle	Porsche 3.8 L Flat-6 Turbo	**Y**	259
56 DNF	GTO	32	(Germany) Konrad Motorsport	(Germany) Jürgen von Gartzen (United States) Charles Slater (United States) Peter Kitchak (United Kingdom) Calum Lockie (Austria) Franz Konrad	Porsche 911 GT2	**D**	248
56 DNF	GTO	32	(Germany) Konrad Motorsport	(Germany) Jürgen von Gartzen (United States) Charles Slater (United States) Peter Kitchak (United Kingdom) Calum Lockie (Austria) Franz Konrad	Porsche 3.8 L Flat-6 Turbo	**D**	248
57 DNF	AGT	40	(United States) Rankin Racing	(United States) David Rankin (The Bahamas) Dorian Foyil (El Salvador) Toto Lassally (United States) Hank Scott (United Kingdom) Ian James	Chevrolet Camaro	**G**	240
57 DNF	AGT	40	(United States) Rankin Racing	(United States) David Rankin (The Bahamas) Dorian Foyil (El Salvador) Toto Lassally (United States) Hank Scott (United Kingdom) Ian James	Chevrolet 5.8 L V8	**G**	240
58 DNF	GTO	15	(United States) Kreider Motorsports	(Argentina) Gaston Aguirre (United States) Scott Watkins (United States) Daniel Urrutia (United States) Rene Villeneuve (United States) Dale Kreider	Chevrolet Corvette C5-R	**G**	239
58 DNF	GTO	15	(United States) Kreider Motorsports	(Argentina) Gaston Aguirre (United States) Scott Watkins (United States) Daniel Urrutia (United States) Rene Villeneuve (United States) Dale Kreider	Chevrolet 5.5 L V8	**G**	239
59 DNF	GTU	24	(United States) Goldin Brothers Racing	(United States) Scott Finlay (United States) Steve Goldin (United States) Keith Goldin	Mazda RX-7	**H** **G**	239
59 DNF	GTU	24	(United States) Goldin Brothers Racing	(United States) Scott Finlay (United States) Steve Goldin (United States) Keith Goldin	Mazda 2-Rotor	**H** **G**	239
60 DNF	GTU	35	(Italy) Franco Scapini Motorsport	(Italy) Pierangelo Masselli (Italy) Franco Scapini (Italy) Erich Prinoth (Italy) Ivan Capelli (Italy) Giuseppe Pellin	Ferrari F355	**P**	228
60 DNF	GTU	35	(Italy) Franco Scapini Motorsport	(Italy) Pierangelo Masselli (Italy) Franco Scapini (Italy) Erich Prinoth (Italy) Ivan Capelli (Italy) Giuseppe Pellin	Ferrari F129B 3.5 L V8	**P**	228
61 DNF	GTU	21	(United States) Aasco Performance	(United States) John Rutherford IV (United States) Andy Hajducky (United States) Dave Geremia (United States) Bobby Oneglia (United States) Ken Fengler (United States) Bobby Carradine	Porsche 911 Carrera RSR	**Y**	227
61 DNF	GTU	21	(United States) Aasco Performance	(United States) John Rutherford IV (United States) Andy Hajducky (United States) Dave Geremia (United States) Bobby Oneglia (United States) Ken Fengler (United States) Bobby Carradine	Porsche 3.8 L Flat-6	**Y**	227
62 DNF	GTU	75	(United States) Champion Racing	(United States) Mike Brockman (United States) Paul Newman (Germany) Michael Lauer (United States) Gunnar Jeannette	Porsche 996 GT3-R	**M**	225
62 DNF	GTU	75	(United States) Champion Racing	(United States) Mike Brockman (United States) Paul Newman (Germany) Michael Lauer (United States) Gunnar Jeannette	Porsche 3.6 L Flat-6	**M**	225
63 DNF	SR	31	(Germany) Konrad Motorsport	(Netherlands) Jan Lammers (Germany) Sascha Maassen (Austria) Franz Konrad	Lola B98/10	**D**	209
63 DNF	SR	31	(Germany) Konrad Motorsport	(Netherlands) Jan Lammers (Germany) Sascha Maassen (Austria) Franz Konrad	Ford 6.0 L V8	**D**	209
64 DNF	SR	00	(Switzerland) Autosport Racing	(Switzerland) Enzo Calderari (Italy) Angelo Zadra (Italy) Marco Zadra (Sweden) Carl Rosenblad (Switzerland) Lilian Bryner	Ferrari 333 SP	**P**	203
64 DNF	SR	00	(Switzerland) Autosport Racing	(Switzerland) Enzo Calderari (Italy) Angelo Zadra (Italy) Marco Zadra (Sweden) Carl Rosenblad (Switzerland) Lilian Bryner	Ferrari F310E 4.0 L V12	**P**	203
65 DNF	GTU	89	(United States) MCR/Nygmatech	(United States) James McCormick (United States) Kevin Crowder (United States) Tim Robertson (United States) Kurt Baumann	Porsche 996 GT3-R	**P**	192
65 DNF	GTU	89	(United States) MCR/Nygmatech	(United States) James McCormick (United States) Kevin Crowder (United States) Tim Robertson (United States) Kurt Baumann	Porsche 3.6 L Flat-6	**P**	192
66 DNF	SR	29	(United States) Intersport Racing	(United States) Andy Petery (United States) Craig Carter (United States) Gerry Green (United States) John Mirro	Riley & Scott Mk III	**G**	175
66 DNF	SR	29	(United States) Intersport Racing	(United States) Andy Petery (United States) Craig Carter (United States) Gerry Green (United States) John Mirro	Ford 5.1 L V8	**G**	175
67 DNF	SR	37	(United States) Intersport Racing	(United States) Jon Field (United States) Dale Whittington (United States) Don Whittington	Lola B98/10	**G**	164
67 DNF	SR	37	(United States) Intersport Racing	(United States) Jon Field (United States) Dale Whittington (United States) Don Whittington	Ford 5.1 L V8	**G**	164
68 DNF	GTU	28	(Japan) Yellow Magic	(Japan) Toshio Suzuki (Sweden) Anders Olofsson (Japan) Tsuyoshi Takahashi (Canada) Van Peter Hanson (United States) Tommy Riggins	Ferrari F355	**Y**	164
68 DNF	GTU	28	(Japan) Yellow Magic	(Japan) Toshio Suzuki (Sweden) Anders Olofsson (Japan) Tsuyoshi Takahashi (Canada) Van Peter Hanson (United States) Tommy Riggins	Ferrari F129B 3.5 L V8	**Y**	164
69 DNF	SR	12	(United States) Risi Competizione	(Italy) Alex Caffi (United Kingdom) Allan McNish (Germany) Ralf Kelleners (Italy) Domenico Schiattarella	Ferrari 333 SP	**P**	162
69 DNF	SR	12	(United States) Risi Competizione	(Italy) Alex Caffi (United Kingdom) Allan McNish (Germany) Ralf Kelleners (Italy) Domenico Schiattarella	Ferrari F310E 4.0 L V12	**P**	162
70 DNF	GTU	55	(United States) Genesis Racing	(United States) Felipe Rezk (United States) Shareef Malnik (United States) Dennis Crowley (United States) Chris Miller (United States) Rick Fairbanks	BMW M3 E36	**Y**	133
70 DNF	GTU	55	(United States) Genesis Racing	(United States) Felipe Rezk (United States) Shareef Malnik (United States) Dennis Crowley (United States) Chris Miller (United States) Rick Fairbanks	BMW 3.2 L I6	**Y**	133
71 DNF	SR	27	(United States) Doran Enterprises, Inc.	(Belgium) Didier Theys (Switzerland) Fredy Lienhard (Canada) Ross Bentley (Italy) Mauro Baldi	Ferrari 333 SP	**M**	132
71 DNF	SR	27	(United States) Doran Enterprises, Inc.	(Belgium) Didier Theys (Switzerland) Fredy Lienhard (Canada) Ross Bentley (Italy) Mauro Baldi	Ferrari F310E 4.0 L V12	**M**	132
72 DNF	GTO	04	(Germany) Roock Racing	(United States) Zak Brown (United Kingdom) David Warnock (United States) Spencer Trenery (United States) Vic Rice (United States) Stephen Earle	Porsche 911 GT2	**Y**	113
72 DNF	GTO	04	(Germany) Roock Racing	(United States) Zak Brown (United Kingdom) David Warnock (United States) Spencer Trenery (United States) Vic Rice (United States) Stephen Earle	Porsche 3.8 L Flat-6 Turbo	**Y**	113
73 DNF	SR	06	(Canada) Multimatic Motorsports	(Canada) Scott Maxwell (Canada) John Graham (Finland) Harri Toivonen	Lola B98/10	**P**	110
73 DNF	SR	06	(Canada) Multimatic Motorsports	(Canada) Scott Maxwell (Canada) John Graham (Finland) Harri Toivonen	Ford-Cosworth XB 2.6 L V8 Turbo	**P**	110
74 DNF	GTU	69	(United Kingdom) EMKA Racing	(United Kingdom) Derek Bell (United Kingdom) Tim Sugden (United Kingdom) Stephen Day (United Kingdom) Steve O'Rourke	Porsche 996 GT3-R	**P**	75
74 DNF	GTU	69	(United Kingdom) EMKA Racing	(United Kingdom) Derek Bell (United Kingdom) Tim Sugden (United Kingdom) Stephen Day (United Kingdom) Steve O'Rourke	Porsche 3.6 L Flat-6	**P**	75
75 DNF	SR	42	(Belgium) EBRT/Schroeder Motorsport	(New Zealand) Rob Wilson (United Kingdom) Martin Henderson (United Kingdom) Martyn Konig (United States) Jake Ulrich	Pilbeam MP84	**D**	51
75 DNF	SR	42	(Belgium) EBRT/Schroeder Motorsport	(New Zealand) Rob Wilson (United Kingdom) Martin Henderson (United Kingdom) Martyn Konig (United States) Jake Ulrich	Nissan 3.0 L V6	**D**	51
76 DNF	GTO	49	(Switzerland) Haberthur Racing	(France) Patrick Vuillaume (United States) Ugo Colombo (Germany) Dieter Faller (Italy) Anssi Muenz	Porsche 911 GT2	**D**	49
76 DNF	GTO	49	(Switzerland) Haberthur Racing	(France) Patrick Vuillaume (United States) Ugo Colombo (Germany) Dieter Faller (Italy) Anssi Muenz	Porsche 3.6 L Flat-6 Turbo	**D**	49
77 DNF	SR	8	(United States) Philip Creighton Motorsports Ltd.	(United States) Scott Schubot (United States) Henry Camferdam (United States) Duncan Dayton (United Kingdom) John Burton	Riley & Scott Mk III	**G**	45
77 DNF	SR	8	(United States) Philip Creighton Motorsports Ltd.	(United States) Scott Schubot (United States) Henry Camferdam (United States) Duncan Dayton (United Kingdom) John Burton	Ford 6.0 L V8	**G**	45
78 DNF	AGT	94	(United States) Associated General Kinetics	(United States) Paul Jenkins (United States) Steve Lisa (United States) Don Arpin (United States) Bill Beilharz (United States) Mark Reed	Chevrolet Camaro	**G**	40
78 DNF	AGT	94	(United States) Associated General Kinetics	(United States) Paul Jenkins (United States) Steve Lisa (United States) Don Arpin (United States) Bill Beilharz (United States) Mark Reed	Chevrolet 6.1 L V8	**G**	40
79 DNF	SR	78	(France) Sezio Florida Racing	(France) Patrice Roussel (France) Edouard Sezionale (United States) A. J. Smith	Norma M2000-01	**P**	13
79 DNF	SR	78	(France) Sezio Florida Racing	(France) Patrice Roussel (France) Edouard Sezionale (United States) A. J. Smith	BMW 4.0 L V8	**P**	13
DNS	GTU	54	(United States) Bell Motorsports	(United States) Matt Drendel (United States) Scott Neuman (United States) Ron Johnson (Germany) Hans-Joachim Stuck (United States) Peter Cunningham	BMW M3 E36	**Y**	-
DNS	GTU	54	(United States) Bell Motorsports	(United States) Matt Drendel (United States) Scott Neuman (United States) Ron Johnson (Germany) Hans-Joachim Stuck (United States) Peter Cunningham	BMW 3.2 L I6	**Y**	-
