= Andreas Waldherr =

Austrian rally driver

Andreas Waldherr (29 April 1968 – 6 July 2011) was an Austrian rally driver.

== Career ==
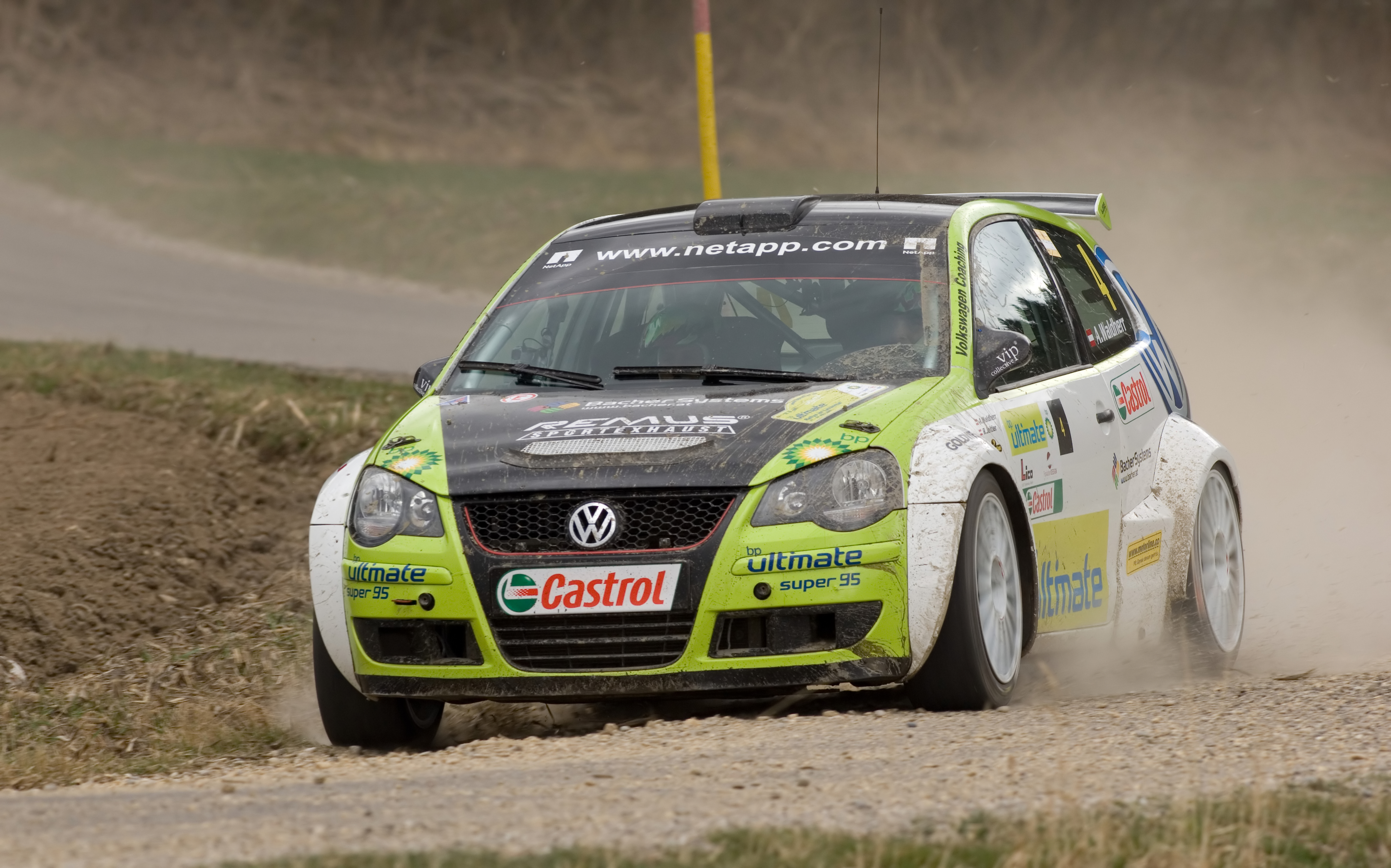
Andreas Waldherr at the Lavanttal-Rally in 2009 with a VW Polo S2000

In 2000, Waldherr achieved second place for diesel vehicles in the Rally Cup of the Supreme National Sports Commission for Motorsports (OSK) of the Austrian Automobile, Motorcycle and Touring Club (ÖAMTC). He won the OSK Rally Cup for diesel vehicles three times, from 2001 to 2003. Since 2004, Waldherr drove successfully in the Austrian Rally National Championship.

Waldherr experienced his greatest success in 2006 when he took third place in the overall standings. He achieved his first success in the Austrian Rally National Championship at the 2–3 May 2008 Bosch Super Plus Rally in a Volkswagen Polo S2000. During his career, Waldherr drove in 72 rallies, three of which won. In the 2010 season, engaged by VW Racing Austria Club, Waldherr was able to finish in second place behind national champion Raimund Baumschlager. However, 2011 was less successful, where he ranked only eighth after experiencing several problems. Waldherr also proved his skills in closed-course racing: In 2006, he took third place in the 24 Hours of Dubai and in 2011 he achieved the highest score for diesel-powered vehicles in a Golf TDI.

Waldherr lived in Thomasberg, Austria, was married and the father of a son Luca, who's also a rally driver.

Waldherr suffered a fatal accident in his workshop in Anspang, Austria on the morning of 6 July 2011 when he was crushed under his rally car while servicing it. He was alone in the workshop at the time he was found by rescue personnel, around 11:30 a.m. Resuscitation efforts were unsuccessful.
