= Mondiale Car Company =

The Mondiale Car Company is a former racing car constructor based in Bangor, County Down, Northern Ireland. Mondiale was highly successful in Formula Ford 1600 and also provided chassis for the Barber Saab Pro Series. Construction of the Mondiale Formula Ford chassis utilized bronze welded joints, also called braze welded, a fabrication method where the base metal is heated but not melted and the fillet material is bronze. This method allows joints under extreme stress to act more ductile without tearing the base metal. Bronze welded joints can be heated, separated, and repaired. This welding technique can be readily found in custom bicycle fabrication. Two keys to the success of this welding method are proper component fitment and cleanliness of the tubing joints.

== History ==
The Mondiale Car Company was founded in 1984 by former Crosslé designer Leslie Drysdale and Irish Formula Ford 1600 team owners Dennis McGall and Colin Lees. Their Formula Ford cars primarily competed in the Irish and British Formula Ford championships. Between 1986 and 1997 Mondiale provided the Barber Saab Pro Series with 30 identical chassis to race.

== Cars ==
Year	Car	Class
1984	Mondiale M84S	Formula Ford 1600
1985	Mondiale M85S	Formula Ford 1600
1986	Mondiale M86S	Formula Ford 1600
1986	Mondiale	Barber Saab Pro Series
1987	Mondiale M87S	Formula Ford 1600
1988	Mondiale M88	Formula Ford 1600
1989	Mondiale M89S	Formula Ford 1600
1991	Mondiale M91	Formula Ford 1600
1992	Mondiale M92	Formula Ford 1600
1993	Mondiale M93	Formula Ford 1600
