= Ken Murillo =

Racing driver

- Born: 1966 (age 59–60)

Previous series
- 1991 1990 1989-1990 1988 1986-1987 1986: Indy Lights; SCCA World Challenge; Formula Ford 2000 Canada; Formula Super Vee; Barber Saab Pro Series; IMSA Firestone Firehawk

Championship titles
- 1988 1987: Formula Super Vee; Barber Saab Pro Series

Ken Murillo is a former racing driver from Santa Rosa, California. Murillo won the 1987 Barber Saab Pro Series and the 1988 Formula Super Vee USA Robert Bosch/Valvoline Championship. Murillow currently co-owns Michelin Pilot Challenge team Murillo Racing.

== Racing career ==
Murillo started in the first season of the Barber Saab Pro Series. Murillo won eighth race at Watkins Glen International. While Willy Lewis won the championship Murillo ended up ninth in the 1986 Barber Saab Pro Series season. He returned in the series the following year winning the first two rounds at Bicentennial Park and Road Atlanta. Murillo also won the race at Watkins Glen International. With three drivers winning three races, the title chase was very close. But as Murillo outperformed Bruce Feldman and Jeremy Dale during the final round at Tamiami Park, Murillo won the title.

After failing to obtain a racing seat in the American Racing Series for 1988, Murillo joined the Formula Super Vee. Murillo drove in the SCCA Formula Super Vee USA Robert Bosch/Valvoline Championship for Lee Hagen Racing. He raced his Volkswagen powered Ralt RT5 to victory at Phoenix International Raceway, Mid-Ohio Sports Car Course and Nazareth Speedway. Due to a strong last quarter of the season, Murillo took the title over E.J. Lenzi.

Following his championships, Murillo moved to Canada to race in the Formula Ford 2000. He finished consistently in the top five in his J.H. Racing Swift SE3 sponsored by Lucasfilm. The following year, he won the first race of the season at Mosport Park. After four more podium finished Murillo finished runner-up in the championship, behind Bobby Carville.

Murillo also made an appearance in the SCCA Escort World Challenge at Mosport Park. Together with Tod Gartshore, Charlie Henry, and Ron Tambourine, Murillo participated in the Toronto Star 24-Hour World Challenge. The Eagle Talon entered by Archer Brothers finished twelfth overall, sixth in class.

After failing to qualify for the Indy Lights race at Long Beach, Murillo retired from professional auto racing.

== Racing record ==
=== Formula Super Vee ===
Year	Team	1	2	3	4	5	6	7	8	9	10	11	12	13	Rank	Points
1988	Hagen Racing	PHX; 1	LBH; 4	DAL; 4	IRP; 3	MIL; 5	DET; 3	NIA; 2	CLE; 4	MEA; 4	MOH; 1	ROA; 3	NAZ; 1	STP; 1	1st	194

=== American open–wheel racing results ===
(key)

==== Indy Lights ====
Year	Team	1	2	3	4	5	6	7	8	9	10	11	12	Rank	Points
1991		LBH; DNQ	PHX	MIL	DET	POR	CLE	MEA	TOR	DEN	MOH	NZR	LS	-	-

=== SCCA National Championship Runoffs ===
Year	Track	Car	Engine	Class	Finish	Start	Status
1998	Mid-Ohio	Nissan 240SX		GT3	1	1	Running

Sporting positions
Preceded by Willy Lewis	Barber Saab Pro Series Champion; 1987	Succeeded by Bruce Feldman
Preceded by Scott Atchison	Formula Super Vee USA; 1988	Succeeded by Mark Smith
