= 1986 Barber Saab Pro Series =

1986 Barber Saab Pro Series season

Seasons
- ← none 1987 →

The 1986 Barber Saab Pro Series season was the inaugural season of the series. All drivers used Saab powered BFGoodrich shod Mondiale chassis. Willy Lewis won the inaugural championship.

== Race calendar and results ==
Round	Circuit	Location	Date	Winner
1	Meadowlands Sports Complex	(United States) East Rutherford, New Jersey	June 29	(United States) Brian Till
2	Watkins Glen International	(United States) Watkins Glen, New York	July 6	(United States) Eric Kielts
3	Brainerd International Raceway	(United States) Brainerd, Minnesota	July 20	(United States) Robby Unser
4	Gateway Motorsports Park	(United States) St. Louis, Missouri	August 3	(United States) Willy Lewis
5	Lime Rock Park	(United States) Lime Rock, Connecticut	August 16	(United States) Eric Kielts
6	Road America	(United States) Elkhart Lake, Wisconsin	August 22	(United States) Bruce Feldman
7	Lime Rock Park	(United States) Lime Rock, Connecticut	September 1	(United States) David Rocha
8	Watkins Glen International	(United States) Watkins Glen, New York	September 21	(United States) Ken Murillo
9	Lime Rock Park	(United States) Lime Rock, Connecticut	October 18	(United States) Willy Lewis
10	Daytona International Speedway	(United States) Daytona Beach, Florida	October 25	(United States) Willy Lewis
11	Tamiami Park	(United States) University Park, Florida	November 9	(Canada) Jeremy Dale

== Final standings ==
Rank	Driver	Points
1	(United States) Willy Lewis	128
2	(United States) Brian Till	125
3	(United States) Eric Kielts	107
4	(United States) Robby Unser	93
5	(United States) David Rocha	87
6	(Canada) Jeremy Dale	63
7	(United States) Bruce Feldman	63
8	(United States) Richard Myhre	45
9	(United States) Ken Murillo	42
10	(United States) Ralph DeSimone	39
11	(United States) Craig Siebert	22
12	(United States) Kurt Roehrig	18
13	(United States) Jeff Pumer	15
14	(United States) Van Roberts	15
15	(United States) Herb Means	14
