= Mark Smith (American racing driver) =

American former racing driver (born 1967)

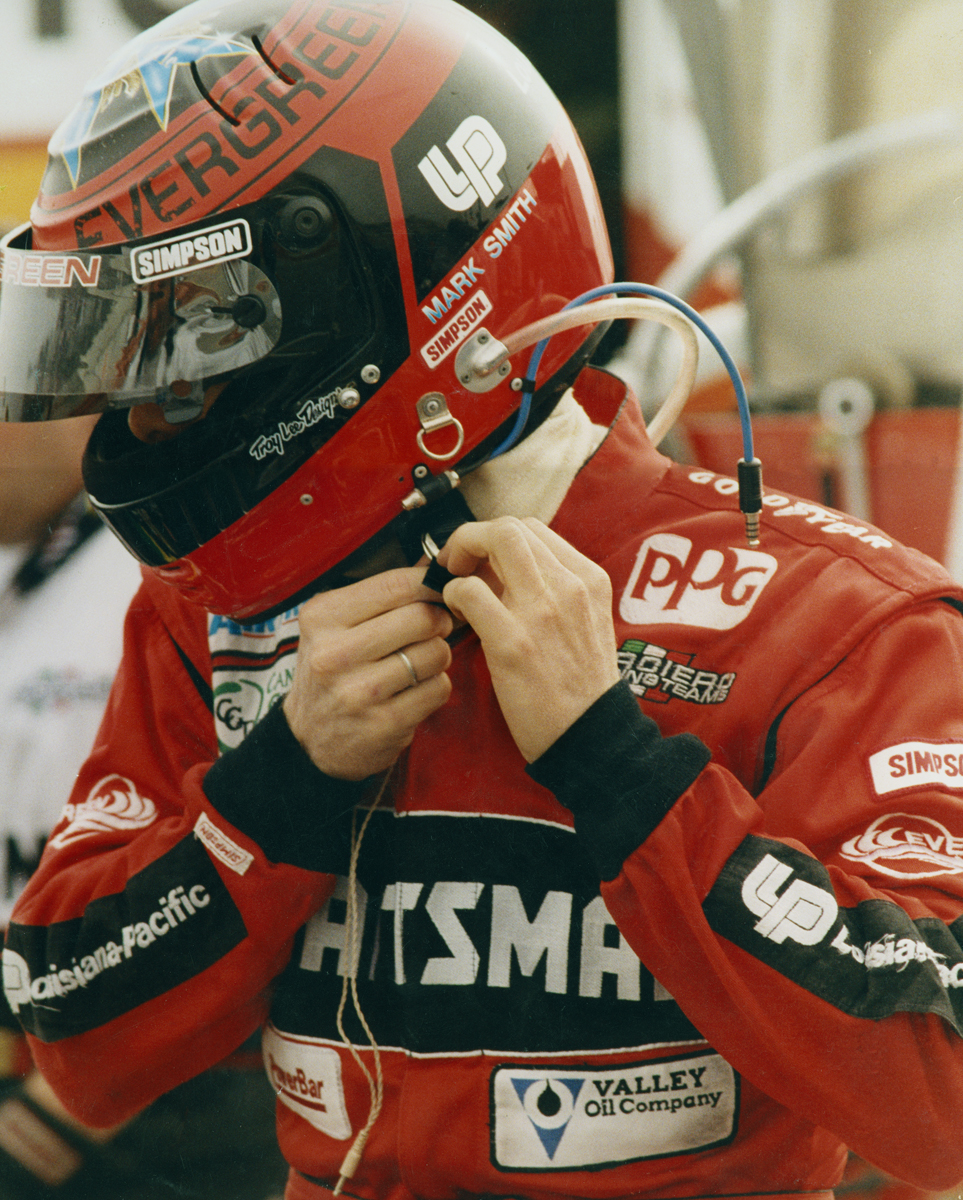
- Nationality: American
- Born: April 10, 1967 (age 59) Portland, Oregon, U.S.
- Retired: 1994

CART Championship Car
- Years active: 1993–1994
- Teams: Arciero Racing; Walker Racing
- Starts: 26

Previous series
- 1988–1989 1989 1990–1992: Formula Super Vee; Formula Pacific; Indy Lights

Championship titles
- 1989: Formula Super Vee

Awards
- 1989 1990: Formula Pacific Rookie of the Year; Indy Lights Rookie of the Year

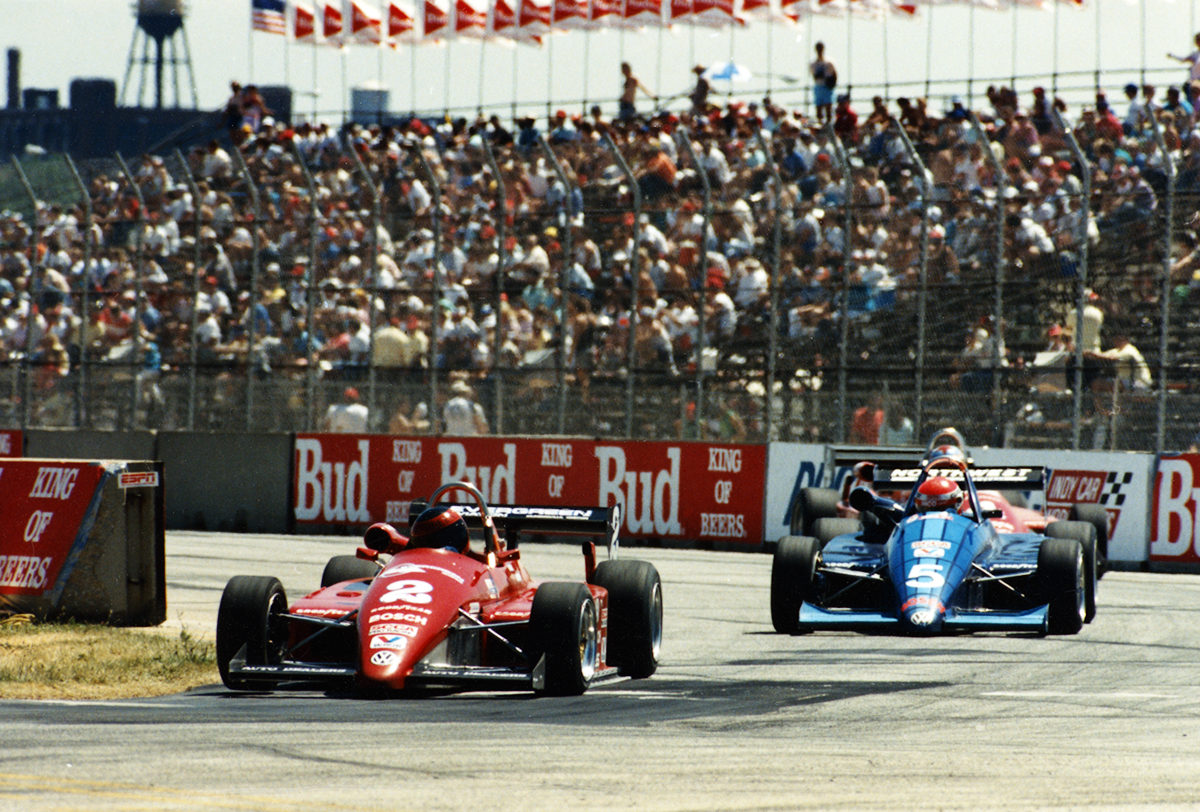
Formula Super Vee: Smith leading Groff at the 1988 Grand Prix of Cleveland

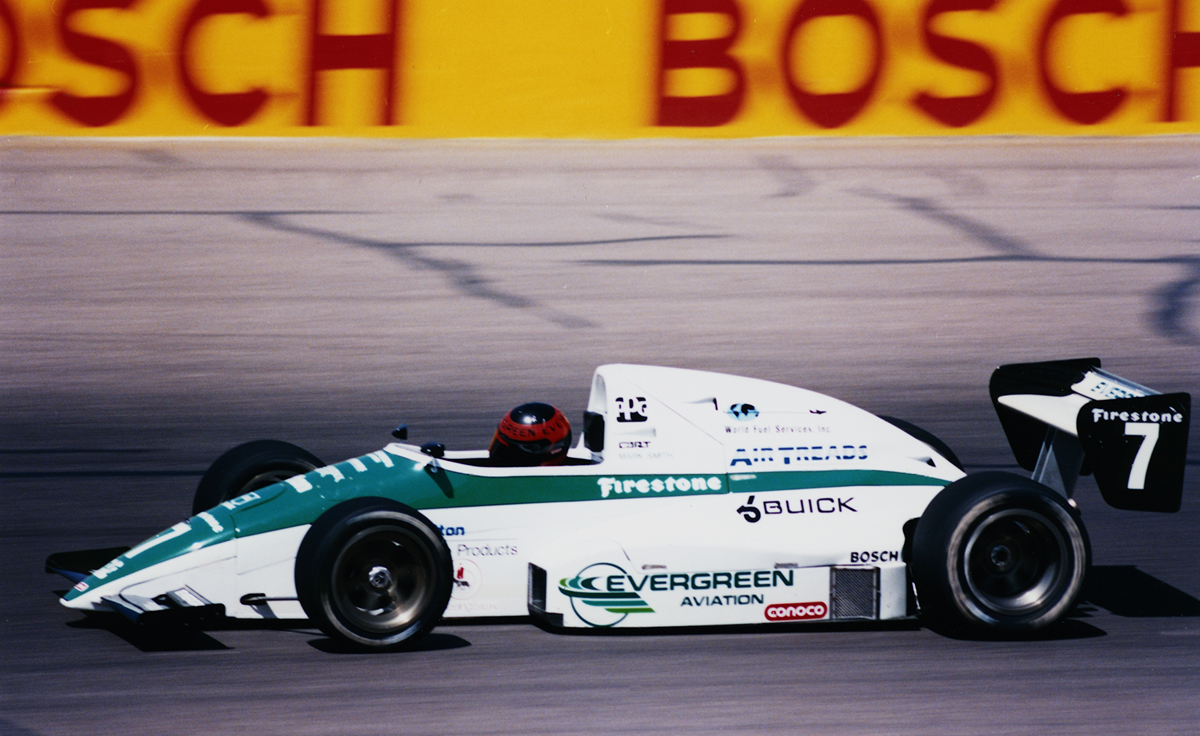
Indy Lights: Smith qualifying at Phoenix International Raceway 1991

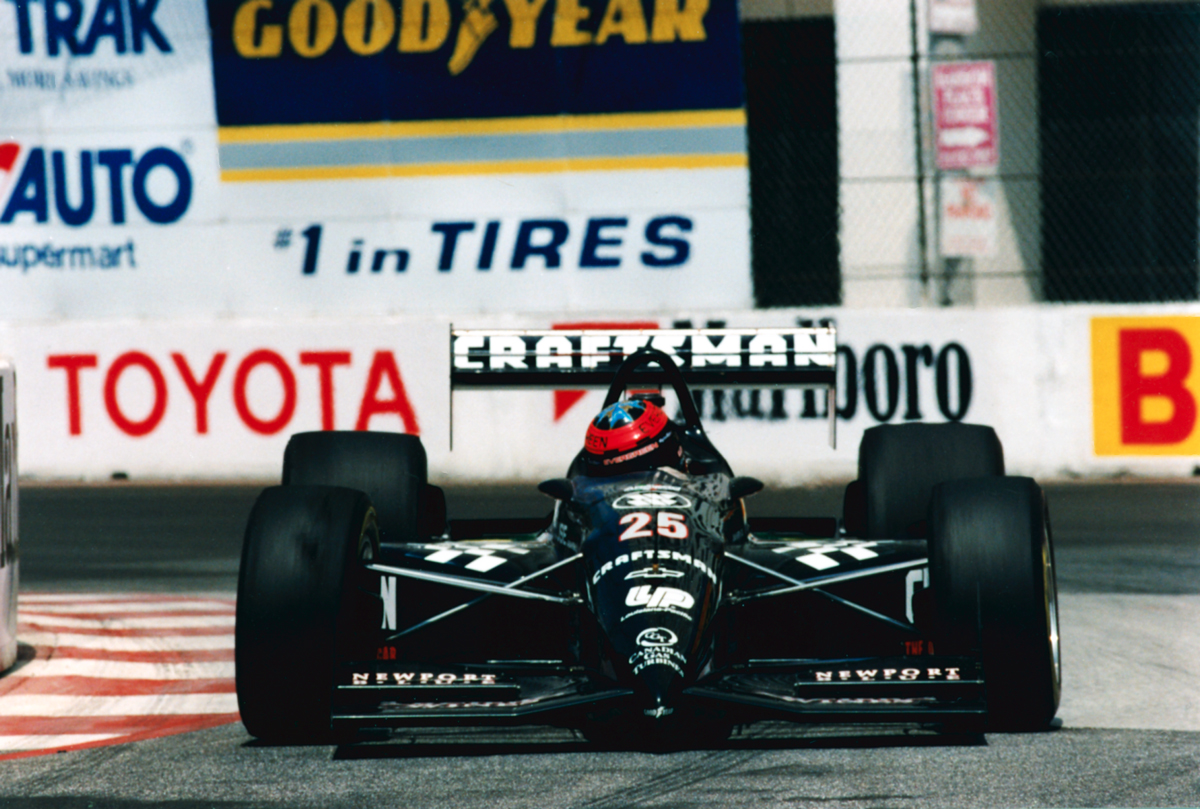
CART: Smith driving for Arciero at the 1993 Long Beach Grand Prix

Mark Smith (born April 10, 1967) is an American former racing driver who competed in the CART IndyCar Series. Smith won the 1989 United States Formula Super Vee Championship and was the 1991 Indy Lights National Championship runner-up.

== Career ==
Smith entered karting competition at the age of 14 and won six championships in multiple IKF divisions. In 1985, he moved up to Formula Ford scoring four race wins in two seasons and then advanced to Formula Super Vee.

After winning the 1989 United States Formula Super Vee Championship with five wins and four poles, Smith raced in Indy Lights from 1990 to 1992, finishing third in series points his rookie year, and second in 1991 capturing three wins and five poles along the way.

In December 1992, it was announced that Smith would make his racing debut in CART / Indy Car, signing with Arciero for the 1993 season. Arciero, being a sparsely budgeted team, fielded a year old, 1992 Penske PC-21/Chevrolet B, for 13 of the 16 scheduled races.

Smith scored two top-ten finishes in the first three races of the season. At the fourth round, the Indianapolis 500, Smith qualified twice for the race but was bumped from the field. His second bumping at the hands of Didier Theys happened just six minutes before the end of qualifications that year, an outcome that added to the Speedway myth about The Curse of the Smiths.

Smith continued to show good pace his rookie year with several top-ten qualifying performances. At the Grand Prix of Portland, the sevenh round of the season, Smith qualified the Arciero PC-21/Chevy B sixth on the grid between the Lolas of Danny Sullivan and Mario Andretti. Early in the race while challenging for fifth, Smith retired with a broken gearbox. The Penske transverse gearbox at the back of the PC-21 plagued Arciero during the 1993 season. After the Grand Prix of Portland in June, Smith retired from the next five races in a row with gearbox problems. Of the 13 races Arciero entered in 1993 the team finished four races, scoring points in three of those four races.

Smith qualified for the 1994 Indianapolis 500 and was bumped from the field by Bobby Rahal. With 14 minutes remaining in the final session, he made a bold attempt to qualify an ill-handling T93 Lola back-up car. His warm up lap of 221.8 mph was fast enough to make the race. On the following lap, he crashed heavily into turn two.

Smith's best IndyCar finish was a fifth place at the 1994 Michigan 500.

== Racing record ==
=== Career summary ===
| Season | Series | Team | Races | Wins | Poles | Podiums | Points | Position |
|---|---|---|---|---|---|---|---|---|
| 1985 | SCCA Formula Ford | P1 Racing | 7 | 1 | | 4 | N/A | N/A |
| 1986 | SCCA Formula Ford | Evergreen | 9 | 3 | 2 | 5 | N/A | N/A |
| 1987 | Formula Super Vee | Wilbur Bunce Engineering | 7 | | | | N/A | N/A |
| 1988 | Formula Super Vee | Dave White Motorsports | 13 | 1 | 1 | 2 | 108 | 6th |
| 1989 | Formula Pacific | Graeme Lawrence Autosport | 10 | 0 | 2 | 7 | 39 | 4th |
| 1989 | New Zealand Grand Prix | Graeme Lawrence Autosport | 1 | 0 | 0 | 1 | N/A | **3rd** |
| 1989 | Formula Super Vee | Ralt America | 11 | 5 | 4 | 8 | 169 | **1st** |
| 1990 | Indy Lights | Ralt America | 2 | | 1 | 2 | 128 | **3rd** |
| 1990 | Indy Lights | Lanford | 12 | 0 | 0 | 2 | 128 | **3rd** |
| 1991 | New Zealand Grand Prix | Graeme Lawrence Autosport | 1 | 0 | 1 | 0 | N/A | Ret |
| 1991 | Indy Lights | Evergreen | 12 | 2 | 3 | 5 | 103 | **2nd** |
| 1992 | Indy Lights | Evergreen | 14 | 1 | 3 | 2 | 134 | 7th |
| 1993 | CART IndyCar | Arciero | 13 | 0 | 0 | 0 | 8 | 22nd |
| 1994 | CART IndyCar | Walker | 16 | 0 | 0 | 0 | 17 | 19th |
| 2022 | SVRA Formula Ford (PCF) | Dave McMillan Racing | 6 | 2 | 2 | 6 | 96 | **3rd** |
| 2022 | Emerald Cup (HF) | Fossi | 1 | 1 | 0 | 1 | 13 | 7th |
| 2023 | Emerald Cup (HF) | Fossi | 5 | 4 | 2 | 5 | 62 | **1st** |
| 2023 | Crossflow Cup (HF) | Fossi | 1 | 1 | 0 | 1 | 11 | 12th |
| 2024 | Emerald Cup (HF) | Fossi | 9 | 8 | 9 | 8 | 107 | **1st** |
| 2024 | Crossflow Cup (HF) | Fossi | 8 | 2 | 2 | 8 | 74 | **1st** |
| 2025 | Emerald Cup (HF) | Fossi | 13 | 8 | 8 | 8 | 108 | **1st** |

=== Formula Super Vee ===
(key) (Races in bold indicate pole position) (Races in italics indicate fastest lap)

| Year | Team | 1 | 2 | 3 | 4 | 5 | 6 | 7 | 8 | 9 | 10 | 11 | 12 | 13 | Rank | Points |
|---|---|---|---|---|---|---|---|---|---|---|---|---|---|---|---|---|
| 1988 | Dave White Motorsports | **PHX**; Ret | LBH; 5 | DAL; 6 | IRP; 6 | MIL; 6 | DET; Ret | NIA; 7 | CLE; 5 | MEA; 1 | MOH; 10 | ROA; 2 | NAZ; 5 | STP; Ret | **6th** | **108** |
| 1989 | Ralt America | PHX; 4 | DAL; 3 | **IRP**; 1* | **MIL**; 1* | CLE; 3 | DEM; 1 | **ATL**; 1* | **MOH**; 1* | ROA; 4 | NAZ; Ret | STP; 3 | | | **1st** | **169** |

=== Formula Pacific ===
| Year | Team | 1 | 2 | 3 | 4 | 5 | 6 | 7 | 8 | 9 | 10 | Rank | Points |
|---|---|---|---|---|---|---|---|---|---|---|---|---|---|
| 1989 | Graeme Lawrence Autosport | BAY; 4 | BAY; 3 | PUK; 3 | PUK; 3 | **MAN**; 3 | **MAN**; 2 | WIG; Ret | WIG; 2 | TIM; 4 | TIM; 2 | **4th** | **39** |

=== New Zealand Grand Prix ===
| Year | Team | Car | Qualifying | Main race |
|---|---|---|---|---|
| 1989 | (New Zealand) Graeme Lawrence Autosport | Swift DB4 - Ford | 5th | **3rd** |
| 1991 | (New Zealand) Graeme Lawrence Autosport | Swift DB4 - Toyota | 1st | Ret |

=== CART Indy Lights ===
| Year | Team | 1 | 2 | 3 | 4 | 5 | 6 | 7 | 8 | 9 | 10 | 11 | 12 | 13 | 14 | Rank | Points |
|---|---|---|---|---|---|---|---|---|---|---|---|---|---|---|---|---|---|
| 1990 | Ralt America | **PHX**; 2 | LBH; 2 | | | | | | | | | | | | | **3rd** | **128** |
| 1990 | Lanford | | | MIL; 9 | DET; 11 | POR; 6 | CLE; 4 | MEA; 10 | TOR; 6 | DEN; 9 | VAN; 2 | MOH; 9 | ROA; 3 | NAZ; 5 | LAG; 5 | **3rd** | **128** |
| 1991 | Evergreen | LBH; 4 | **PHX**; 2* | MIL; 7 | DET; 6 | POR; 3 | **CLE**; 1* | **MEA**; 5 | TOR; 5 | DEN; 4 | MOH; 2 | NAZ; 8 | LAG; 1* | | | **2nd** | **155** |
| 1992 | Evergreen | PHX; 7 | LBH; 11 | DET; 3 | POR; 11 | MIL; 5 | NHA; 11 | **TOR**; 9 | CLE; 10 | VAN; 1 | MOH; 7 | NAZ; 5 | LAG; 14 | | | **7th** | **74** |

=== CART ===
| Year | Team | 1 | 2 | 3 | 4 | 5 | 6 | 7 | 8 | 9 | 10 | 11 | 12 | 13 | 14 | 15 | 16 | Rank | Points | Ref |
|---|---|---|---|---|---|---|---|---|---|---|---|---|---|---|---|---|---|---|---|---|
| 1993 | Arciero | SRF; 18 | PHX; 9 | LBH; 10 | INDY; DNQ | MIL | DET; 27 | POR; 29 | CLE; 15 | TOR; 23 | MIC | NHA | ROA; 24 | VAN; 22 | MOH; 19 | NAZ; 12 | LAG; 17 | **22nd** | **8** | |
| 1994 | Walker | SRF; 21 | PHX; DNS | LBH; 25 | INDY; DNQ | MIL; 24 | DET; 14 | POR; 16 | CLE; 22 | TOR; 30 | MIC; 5 | MOH; 20 | NHA; 12 | VAN; 8 | ROA; 26 | NAZ; 12 | LAG; 14 | **19th** | **17** | |

Sporting positions
| Preceded by Ken Murillo | US Formula Super Vee Championship; Champion; 1989 | Succeeded by Stuart Crow |
| Preceded by P. J. Jones | Indy Lights Rookie of the Year; 1990 | Succeeded by Frank Freon |
