= Sandy Brody =

American former racing driver

Sandy Brody (born August 4, 1967) is an American former racing driver. He competed in the British Formula 3 Championship in 1990 and 1991. In 1991, he captured six National Class wins driving for ZW Motorsport and Alan Docking Racing and finished runner-up in the National Class championship. He returned to his native United States in 1992 to compete in the Indy Lights series where he finished sixth in his rookie season. The following year he finished tenth in points, capturing his only series win in the season opener at Phoenix International Raceway. That season was apparently his last in professional racing.
