= 1987 Barber Saab Pro Series =

1987 Barber Saab Pro Series season

Seasons
- ← 1986 1988 →

The 1987 Barber Saab Pro Series season was the second season of the series. All drivers used Saab powered BFGoodrich shod Mondiale chassis. Ken Murillo won the championship.

== Race calendar and results ==
| Round | Circuit | Location | Date | Winner |
|---|---|---|---|---|
| 1 | Bicentennial Park | (United States) Miami, Florida | March 1 | (United States) Ken Murillo |
| 2 | Road Atlanta | (United States) Braselton, Georgia | April 12 | (United States) Ken Murillo |
| 3 | Lime Rock Park | (United States) Lime Rock, Connecticut | May 25 | (United States) Bruce Feldman |
| 4 | Mid-Ohio Sports Car Course | (United States) Lexington, Ohio | June 7 | (Canada) Jeremy Dale |
| 5 | Summit Point Motorsports Park | (United States) Jefferson County, West Virginia | June 12 | (United States) Tim Colwell |
| 6 | Portland International Raceway | (United States) Portland, Oregon | July 25 | (United States) Tim Colwell |
| 7 | Sears Point Raceway | (United States) Sonoma, California | August 1 | (Canada) Jeremy Dale |
| 8 | Watkins Glen International | (United States) Watkins Glen, New York | August 8 | (United States) Ken Murillo |
| 9 | Road America | (United States) Elkhart Lake, Wisconsin | August 30 | (Canada) Jeremy Dale |
| 10 | HemisFair Park | (United States) San Antonio, Texas | September 6 | (United States) Bruce Feldman |
| 11 | Watkins Glen International | (United States) Watkins Glen, New York | September 27 | (United States) Bruce Feldman |
| 12 | Tamiami Park | (United States) University Park, Florida | November 1 | (Argentina) Juan Manuel Fangio II |

== Final standings ==
| Color | Result |
|---|---|
| Gold | Winner |
| Silver | 2nd place |
| Bronze | 3rd place |
| Green | 4th & 5th place |
| Light Blue | 6th–10th place |
| Dark Blue | 11th place or lower |
| Purple | Did not finish |
| Red | Did not qualify (DNQ) |
| Brown | Withdrawn (Wth) |
| Black | Disqualified (DSQ) |
| White | Did not start (DNS) |
| Blank | Did not participate (DNP) |
| Blank | Driver replacement (Rpl) |
| Blank | Injured (Inj) |
| Blank | No race held (NH) |

| Rank | Driver | (United States) BIC | (United States) ATL | (United States) LRP | (United States) MOH | (United States) SUM | (United States) POR | (United States) SON | (United States) WGI1 | (United States) ROA | (United States) SAS | (United States) WGI2 | (United States) MIA | Points |
|---|---|---|---|---|---|---|---|---|---|---|---|---|---|---|
| 1 | (United States) Ken Murillo | 1 | 1 | | | | | | 1 | | | | | 142 |
| 2 | (United States) Bruce Feldman | 2 | | 1 | | | | | | | 1 | 1 | | 136 |
| 3 | (Canada) Jeremy Dale | 4 | | | 1 | | | 1 | | 1 | | | | 126 |
| 4 | (United States) Tim Colwell | | | | | 1 | 1 | | | | | | | 122 |
| 5 | (United Kingdom) Greg Hobbs | 5 | | | | | | | | | | | | 54 |
| 6 | (United States) Robbie Buhl | | | | | | | | | | | | | 53 |
| 7 | (Netherlands) Hendrick ten Cate | | | | | | | | | | | | | 53 |
| 8 | (United States) Mark Wyborny | 3 | | | | | | | | | | | | 51 |
| 9 | (United States) Andy Swett | | | | | | | | | | | | | 31 |
| 10 | (Colombia) John Estupiñán | | | | | | | | | | | | | 24 |
| 11 | (United States) Stephen Hynes | | | | | | | | | | | | | 24 |
| 12 | (Argentina) Juan Manuel Fangio II | | | | | | | | | | | | 1 | 20 |
| 13 | (Canada) Bobby Carville | | | | | | | | | | | | | 16 |
| 14 | (United States) William Henderson | | | | | | | | | | | | | 15 |
| 15 | (United States) Mark Brainard | | | | | | | | | | | | | 14 |
| | Tom Rojewski | 6 | | | | | | | | | | | | |
| | (El Salvador) Francisco Miguel Reinharth | 7 | | | | | | | | | | | | |
| | Michael Ciasulli | 8 | | | | | | | | | | | | |
| | Mark Reeves | 9 | | | | | | | | | | | | |
| | Paco Diaz | 10 | | | | | | | | | | | | |
