= Eric Kielts =

Eric Kielts (born 5 August 1960) is a former racing driver. Kielts won races in single seater series such as the Barber Saab Pro Series. Currently Kielts is active in the lubrication industry.

== Racing career ==
Kielts made his first national race appearance in the SCCA National Championship Runoffs. Kielts raced three times at the SCCA's most prestigious race. In 1983 Kielts raced a year old Van Diemen RF82 finishing 21st. The following year, in a Van Diemen RF84, Kielts finished 27th. Finally, in 1985, Kielts scored his best result. He placed his Swift DB1 in twelfth place.

After three years of Formula Ford racing, Kielts decided he would either step up to a higher series, or quit racing. The Barber Saab Pro Series was launched for the 1986 season. Failing to secure sponsorship Kielts, supported by his wife Debbie, decided to sell their house in Ann Arbor, Michigan. The family moved to a rental appartement in Oak Park, Michigan. The sale provided the much needed capital to compete in the Barber Saab series. Kielts won races at Watkins Glen International and Lime Rock Park. Kielts was in the title race until the last round at Tamiami Park (Miami). He eventually ended up third in the championship standings.

Unable to secure funds to keep racing, Kielts ended his racing career.

== Personal life ==
Eric is the son of Ted Kielts and Anne Marie Kielts (née Coleman). Eric is a graduate of the University of Dayton in the field of chemistry. During his racing career, Eric worked at Argent Limited as a chemist. He later joined the Wallover Oil Company. At Wallover, he worked his way up the management positions. After ten years as the vice president of laboratory services Kielts was appointed president and CEO in 2010.

== Racing results ==
=== SCCA National Championship Runoffs ===
Year	Track	Car	Engine	Class	Finish	Start	Status
1983	Road Atlanta	Van Diemen RF82	Ford Kent	Formula Ford	21	37	Running
1984	Road Atlanta	Van Diemen RF84	Ford Kent	Formula Ford	27	34	Running
1985	Road Atlanta	Swift DB1	Ford Kent	Formula Ford	12	25	Running
