= Bruce Feldman =

American racing driver

- Nationality: American
- Born: Danville, Illinois, U.S.

Previous series
- 1992 1989 1986-1988: Indy Lights; SCCA Corvette Challenge; Barber Saab Pro Series

Championship titles
- 1988, 2002, 2003: Barber Saab Pro Series, USAC Formula Russell Championship

Bruce Feldman is an American racing driver from San Ramon, California. He won the 1988 Barber Saab Pro Series championship. He also competed in the 1992 Indy Lights season.

== Racing career ==
Feldman Started racing in go karts at the age of ten and that was followed by success in drag racing and solo contests.

After a career in SCCA Formula Ford and the Skip Barber Racing Series, Feldman debuted in the first ever Barber Saab Pro Series. Feldman won the sixth race of the 2006 season at Road America. He returned to the Saab powered championship in 1987. Winning three races the American ended up second in the standings. In his final season in the series Feldman won two races but as a result of strong point finishes he clinched the championship in the final round.

Following his championship win in 1989, Feldman moved to the SCCA Corvette Challenge. Feldman was entered by David Lavertue in the #5 Chevrolet Corvette R7F in nine out of twelve rounds. The fast driver started second at the Des Moines Street Circuit but was crashed out of the race. His best results came at the Detroit Belle Isle Grand Prix and Mid-Ohio Sports Car Course where he finished eleventh.

In 1992, Feldman was signed by Leading Edge Motorsport to compete in the Indy Lights. He competed in four races in his Buick powered March Wildcat. His best result came at New Hampshire Motor Speedway, he finished eighth. Due to a lack of sponsorship his Indy Lights career was cut short.

In 2002, Feldman raced in the Formula Russell Series winning the Masters Championship, then came back in 2003 and won the overall USAC Russell Championship. In 2004 and 2005 he won races in abbreviated seasons of the Formula Russell Championship.

== Racing record ==
=== American open–wheel racing results ===
(key)

==== Indy Lights ====
Year	Team	1	2	3	4	5	6	7	8	9	10	11	12	Rank	Points
1992	Leading Edge Motorsport	PHX; 9	LBH; Ret	DET; 10	POR	MIL	LOU; 8	TOR	CLE	VAN	MOH	NAZ	LS	15th	12

=== SCCA National Championship Runoffs ===
Year	Track	Car	Engine	Class	Finish	Start	Status
1974	Road Atlanta	Lola T340	Ford Kent	Formula Ford	18	14	Not running
1975	Road Atlanta	Lola T340	Ford Kent	Formula Ford	12	19	Running
