= 1992 Indy Lights season =

The 1992 Firestone Indy Lights Championship consisted of 12 races. American Robbie Buhl captured a single victory on his way to the championship. This was the last season where all chassis were supplied by March.

== Calendar ==
| Race No | Track | State | Date | Laps | Distance | Time | Speed | Winner | Pole position | Most leading laps | Fastest race lap |
|---|---|---|---|---|---|---|---|---|---|---|---|
| 1 | Phoenix | Arizona | April 5, 1992 | 75 | 1.6093=120.6975 km | 0'36:54.582 | 196.205 km/h | Adrian Fernández | Franck Fréon | Adrian Fernández | Adrian Fernández |
| 2 | Long Beach | California | April 12, 1992 | 47 | 2.558787=120.262989 km | 0'52:08.534 | 138.386 km/h | Franck Fréon | Franck Fréon | Franck Fréon | Franck Fréon |
| 3 | Detroit | Michigan | June 7, 1992 | 29 | 3.37953=98.00637 km | 0'48:14.272 | 121.904 km/h | Adrian Fernández | Adrian Fernández | Adrian Fernández | ? |
| 4 | Portland | Oregon | June 21, 1992 | 39 | 3.138135=122.387265 km | 0'46:02.544 | 159.489 km/h | Franck Fréon | Franck Fréon | Franck Fréon | Franck Fréon |
| 5 | Milwaukee | Wisconsin | June 28, 1992 | 75 | 1.6607976=124.55982 km | 0'36:53.309 | 202.600 km/h | Adrian Fernández | Adrian Fernández | Adrian Fernández | ? |
| 6 | Loudon | New Hampshire | July 5, 1992 | 71 | 1.7026394=120.8873974 km | 0'43:54.471 | 165.192 km/h | Adrian Fernández | Adrian Fernández | Adrian Fernández | ? |
| 7 | Toronto | Canada | July 19, 1992 | 42 | 2.8709912=120.58163 km | 0'56:23.545 | 128.296 km/h | Bryan Herta | Mark Smith | Robbie Buhl | ? |
| 8 | Cleveland | Ohio | August 9, 1992 | 32 | 3.8124317=121.9978144 km | 0'40:30.83 | 180.676 km/h | Franck Fréon | Robbie Buhl | Franck Fréon | ? |
| 9 | Vancouver | Canada | August 30, 1992 | 45 | 2.6987961=121.4458245 km | 0'57:37.506 | 126.451 km/h | Mark Smith | Robbie Buhl | Robbie Buhl | ? |
| 10 | Lexington | Ohio | September 13, 1992 | 34 | 3.6337994=122.004252 km | 0'50:03.661 | 146.227 km/h | Robbie Groff | Franck Fréon | Franck Fréon | Robbie Groff |
| 11 | Nazareth | Pennsylvania | October 4, 1992 | 75 | 1.5223978=114.179835 km | 0'37:52.115 | 180.910 km/h | Robbie Buhl | Robbie Buhl | Robbie Buhl | ? |
| 12 | Monterey | California | October 18, 1992 | 34 | 3.5629902=121.1416668 km | 0'46:58.837 | 154.713 km/h | Robbie Groff | Robbie Groff | Robbie Groff | ? |

== Race summaries ==
=== Phoenix race ===
Held April 5 at Phoenix International Raceway. Franck Fréon won the pole.

Top Five Results

1. Adrian Fernández
2. Robbie Groff
3. Robbie Buhl
4. Marco Greco
5. Tommy Byrne

=== Long Beach race ===
Held April 12 at Long Beach, California Street Course. Franck Fréon won the pole.

Top Five Results

1. Franck Fréon
2. Robbie Groff
3. Robbie Buhl
4. Marco Greco
5. Sandy Brody

=== Detroit race ===
Held June 7 at Belle Isle Raceway. Adrian Fernández won the pole.

Top Five Results

1. Adrian Fernández
2. Robbie Buhl
3. Mark Smith
4. Tommy Byrne
5. Franck Fréon

=== Portland race ===
Held June 21 at Portland International Raceway. Franck Fréon won the pole.

Top Five Results

1. Franck Fréon
2. Robbie Buhl
3. Tommy Byrne
4. Robbie Groff
5. Sandy Brody

=== Milwaukee race ===
Held June 28 at The Milwaukee Mile. Adrian Fernández won the pole.

Top Five Results

1. Adrian Fernández
2. Robbie Groff
3. Robbie Buhl
4. Franck Fréon
5. Mark Smith

=== Loudon race ===
Held July 5 at New Hampshire International Speedway. Adrian Fernández won the pole.

Top Five Results

1. Adrian Fernández
2. Franck Fréon
3. Robbie Buhl
4. Bryan Herta
5. Dave Kudrave

=== Toronto race ===
Held July 19 at Exhibition Place. Mark Smith won the pole.

Top Five Results

1. Bryan Herta
2. Robbie Buhl
3. Marco Greco
4. Sandy Brody
5. Robbie Groff

=== Cleveland race ===
Held August 9 at Burke Lakefront Airport. Robbie Buhl won the pole.

Top Five Results

1. Franck Fréon
2. Bryan Herta
3. Robbie Buhl
4. Mike Snow
5. Sandy Brody

=== Vancouver race ===
Held August 30 at Pacific Place. Robbie Buhl won the pole.

Top Five Results

1. Mark Smith
2. Robbie Buhl
3. Sandy Brody
4. Franck Fréon
5. Bryan Herta

=== Mid-Ohio race ===
Held September 13 at The Mid-Ohio Sports Car Course. Franck Fréon won the pole.

Top Five Results

1. Robbie Groff
2. Fredrik Ekblom
3. Robbie Buhl
4. Bryan Herta
5. Adrian Fernández

=== Nazareth race ===
Held October 4 at Nazareth Speedway. Robbie Buhl won the pole.

Top Five Results

1. Robbie Buhl
2. Franck Fréon
3. Bryan Herta
4. Robbie Groff
5. Mark Smith

=== Laguna Seca race ===
Held October 18 at Mazda Raceway Laguna Seca. Robbie Groff won the pole.

Top Five Results

1. Robbie Groff
2. Bryan Herta
3. Franck Fréon
4. Robbie Buhl
5. Adrian Fernández

== Final points standings ==
=== Driver ===
For every race the points were awarded: 20 points to the winner, 16 for runner-up, 14 for third place, 12 for fourth place, 10 for fifth place, 8 for sixth place, 6 seventh place, winding down to 1 points for 12th place. Additional points were awarded to the pole winner (1 point) and to the driver leading the most laps (1 point).

| Place | Name | Country | Team | Total points | (United States) | (United States) | (United States) | (United States) | (United States) | (United States) | (Canada) | (United States) | (Canada) | (United States) | (United States) | (United States) |
|---|---|---|---|---|---|---|---|---|---|---|---|---|---|---|---|---|
| 1 | Robbie Buhl | United States | Leading Edge Motorsport | 186 | 14 | 14 | 16 | 16 | 14 | 14 | 17 | 15 | 18 | 14 | 22 | 12 |
| 2 | Franck Fréon | France | Landford Racing | 159 | 3 | 22 | 10 | 22 | 12 | 16 | 1 | 21 | 12 | 10 | 16 | 14 |
| 3 | Adrian Fernández | Mexico | John Martin Racing | 134 | 21 | 1 | 22 | 8 | 22 | 22 | 8 | 3 | 4 | 10 | 3 | 10 |
| 4 | Robbie Groff | United States | Groff Motorsports | 128 | 16 | 16 | - | 12 | 16 | 1 | 10 | - | 3 | 20 | 12 | 22 |
| 5 | Bryan Herta | United States | Landford Racing | 120 | - | - | 6 | 6 | 8 | 12 | 20 | 16 | 10 | 12 | 14 | 16 |
| 6 | Sandy Brody | United States | McNeill Motorsports | 85 | 5 | 10 | 5 | 10 | 4 | 6 | 12 | 10 | 14 | 5 | 4 | - |
| 7 | Mark Smith | United States | Evergreen Racing | 74 | 6 | 2 | 14 | - | 10 | 2 | 4 | - | 20 | 6 | 10 | - |
| | Marco Greco | Brazil | Landford Racing | 74 | 12 | 12 | 8 | - | 5 | 8 | 14 | 4 | - | 3 | 8 | - |
| 9 | Dave Kudrave | United States | Regency Racing | 49 | 8 | - | 4 | 4 | 6 | 10 | 6 | - | 6 | - | 5 | - |
| 10 | Tommy Byrne | Ireland | P.I.G. Racing | 44 | 10 | 8 | 12 | 14 | - | - | - | - | - | - | - | - |
| 11 | Fredrik Ekblom | Sweden | Bradley Motorsports | 24 | - | - | - | - | - | - | - | - | - | 16 | - | 8 |
| 12 | George Sutcliffe | United States | P.I.G. Racing | 17 | - | - | 2 | - | 2 | 4 | 4 | 5 | - | - | - | - |
| 13 | Mike Snow | United States | Bradley Motorsports | 16 | - | - | - | 2 | - | - | - | 12 | 2 | - | - | - |
| | Mark Ritchey | United States | Miller Racing Team | 16 | - | 4 | - | - | 1 | - | 5 | 1 | 1 | 4 | - | - |
| 15 | Bruce Feldman | United States | Leading Edge Motorsport | 12 | 4 | - | 3 | - | - | 5 | - | - | - | - | - | - |
| | Bob Dorricott Jr. | United States | Cameron-McGee Motorsports | 12 | 3 | 5 | - | 3 | - | - | - | - | - | - | - | 1 |
| 17 | Bob Reid | United States | P.I.G. Racing | 11 | - | - | 1 | - | - | - | - | 8 | - | 2 | - | - |
| | Philippe Favre | Switzerland | Landford Racing | 11 | - | - | - | - | - | - | - | - | - | - | 6 | 5 |
| 19 | Elton Julian | United States | McNeill Motorsports | 8 | - | - | - | - | - | - | - | - | 8 | - | - | - |
| | Rick Hill | United States | 3-D Motorsports | 8 | - | 6 | - | - | - | - | - | - | - | - | - | 2 |
| 21 | John Brumder | United States | Bradley Motorsports | 6 | - | - | - | - | - | - | - | 6 | - | - | - | - |
| | Jeff Ward | United States | P.I.G. Racing | 6 | - | - | - | - | - | - | - | - | - | - | - | 6 |
| 23 | Vince Neil | United States | P.I.G. Racing | 5 | 1 | - | - | 1 | 3 | - | - | - | - | - | - | - |
| | Scott Wood | United States | P.I.G. Racing | 5 | - | 3 | - | - | - | - |
| | Scott Wood | United States | Landford Racing | 5 | | | | | | | 2 | - | - | - | - | - |
| | Alex Padilla | United States | McNeill Motorsports | 5 | - | - | - | 5 | - | - | - | - | - | - | - | - |
| | Scott Maxwell | Canada | Landford Racing | 5 | - | - | - | - | - | - | - | - | 5 | - | - | - |
| | Billy Roe | United States | P.I.G. Racing | 5 | - | - | - | - | - | 3 | - | - | - | - |
| | Billy Roe | United States | McCormack Racing | 5 | | | | | | | | | | | 2 | - |
| 28 | Robert Amrén | Sweden | McNeill Motorsports | 4 | - | - | - | - | - | - | - | - | - | - | - | 4 |
| | Scott Schubot | United States | TransAtlantic Racing | 4 | - | - | - | - | - | - | - | - | - | 1 | - | 3 |
| 30 | Jack Miller | United States | Miller Racing Team | 2 | - | - | - | - | - | - | - | 2 | - | - | - | - |

== Complete Overview ==
| first column of every race | 10 | = grid position |

| second column of every race | 10 | = race result |

R12=retired, but classified NS=did not start

| Place | Name | Country | Team | (United States) | | (United States) | | (United States) | | (United States) | | (United States) | | (United States) | | (Canada) | | (United States) | | (Canada) | | (United States) | | (United States) | | (United States) |
| 1 | Robbie Buhl | United States | Leading Edge Motorsport | 3 | 3 | 2 | 3 | 6 | 2 | 2 | 2 | 3 | 3 | 2 | 3 | 5 | 2 | 1 | 3 | 1 | 2 | 6 | 3 | 1 | 1 | 7 | 4 |
| 2 | Franck Fréon | France | Landford Racing | 1 | 11 | 1 | 1 | 5 | 5 | 1 | 1 | 13 | 4 | 3 | 2 | 2 | R12 | 3 | 1 | 3 | 4 | 1 | 6 | 2 | 2 | 3 | 3 |
| 3 | Adrian Fernández | Mexico | John Martin Racing | 2 | 1 | 5 | R12 | 1 | 1 | 5 | 6 | 1 | 1 | 1 | 1 | 6 | 6 | 7 | 10 | 5 | 9 | 5 | 5 | 4 | R10 | 4 | 5 |
| 4 | Robbie Groff | United States | Groff Motorsports | 6 | 2 | 3 | 2 | 4 | R15 | 4 | 4 | 4 | 2 | 5 | R12 | 7 | 5 | - | - | 2 | 10 | 4 | 1 | 6 | 4 | 1 | 1 |
| 5 | Bryan Herta | United States | Landford Racing | 8 | R16 | 11 | R13 | 8 | 7 | 7 | 7 | 6 | 6 | 8 | 4 | 3 | 1 | 2 | 2 | 6 | 5 | 3 | 4 | 5 | 3 | 2 | 2 |
| 6 | Sandy Brody | United States | McNeill Motorsports | 13 | 8 | 7 | 5 | 15 | 8 | 10 | 5 | 12 | 9 | 9 | 7 | 9 | 4 | 4 | 5 | 7 | 3 | 13 | 8 | 8 | 9 | 12 | R14 |
| 7 | Mark Smith | United States | Evergreen Racing | 5 | 7 | 4 | R11 | 3 | 3 | 3 | 14 | 2 | 5 | 7 | 11 | 1 | R10 | 15 | R14 | 4 | 1 | 10 | 7 | 2 | 5 | 6 | R20 |
| | Marco Greco | Brazil | Landford Racing | 4 | 4 | 8 | 4 | 10 | 6 | 9 | R17 | 7 | 8 | 6 | 6 | 8 | 3 | 5 | 9 | - | - | 11 | 10 | 9 | 6 | - | - |
| 9 | Dave Kudrave | United States | Regency Racing | 9 | 6 | 6 | R15 | 11 | 9 | 13 | 9 | 5 | 7 | 4 | 5 | 4 | 7 | 6 | R13 | 8 | 7 | 7 | R18 | 7 | R8 | 5 | R16 |
| 10 | Tommy Byrne | Ireland | P.I.G. Racing | 7 | 5 | 9 | 6 | 2 | 4 | 6 | 3 | 8 | 13 | - | - | - | - | - | - | - | - | - | - | - | - | - | - |
| 11 | Fredrik Ekblom | Sweden | Bradley Motorsports | - | - | - | - | - | - | - | - | - | - | - | - | - | - | - | - | - | - | 2 | 2 | - | - | 9 | 6 |
| 12 | George Sutcliffe | United States | P.I.G. Racing | - | - | - | - | 14 | R11 | 15 | 15 | 9 | 11 | 10 | 9 | 14 | 9 | 10 | 8 | 14 | 13 | - | - | - | - | 18 | 13 |
| 13 | Mike Snow | United States | Bradley Motorsports | 16 | 15 | - | - | - | - | 11 | 11 | - | - | - | - | - | - | 8 | 4 | 9 | 11 | 8 | 15 | - | - | 10 | R15 |
| | Mark Ritchey | United States | Miller Racing Team | - | - | 14 | 9 | 12 | 13 | 14 | 13 | 11 | 12 | - | - | 12 | 8 | 12 | 12 | 11 | 12 | 15 | 9 | - | - |
| | Mark Ritchey | United States | Leading Edge Motorsport | | | | | | | | | | | | | | | | | | | | | | | 19 | R19 |
| 15 | Bruce Feldman | United States | Leading Edge Motorsport | 12 | 9 | 13 | R16 | 7 | 10 | - | - | - | - | 12 | 8 | - | - | - | - | - | - | - | - | - | - | - | - |
| | Bob Dorricott Jr. | United States | Cameron-McGee Motorsports | 11 | 10 | 12 | 8 | - | - | 12 | 10 | - | - | - | - | - | - | - | - | 12 | R15 | - | - | - | - | 17 | 12 |
| 17 | Bob Reid | United States | P.I.G. Racing | - | - | - | - | 13 | 12 | - | - | - | - | - | - | 11 | R13 | 11 | 6 | - | - | 14 | 11 | - | - | - | - |
| | Philippe Favre | Switzerland | Landford Racing | - | - | - | - | - | - | - | - | - | - | - | - | - | - | - | - | - | - | 9 | R16 | 10 | 7 | 15 | 8 |
| 19 | Elton Julian | United States | McNeill Motorsports | - | - | - | - | - | - | - | - | - | - | - | - | - | - | - | - | 10 | 6 | - | - | - | - | - | - |
| | Rick Hill | United States | 3-D Motorsports | - | - | 15 | 7 | - | - | - | - | - | - | - | - | - | - | - | - | - | - | - | - | - | - | 20 | 11 |
| 21 | John Brumder | United States | Bradley Motorsports | - | - | - | - | - | - | - | - | - | - | - | - | - | - | 13 | 7 | - | - | - | - | - | - | - | - |
| | Jeff Ward | United States | P.I.G. Racing | - | - | - | - | - | - | - | - | - | - | - | - | - | - | - | - | - | - | - | - | - | - | 13 | 7 |
| 23 | Vince Neil | United States | P.I.G. Racing | 14 | 12 | 17 | R17 | - | - | 16 | 12 | 10 | 10 | - | - | - | - | - | - | - | - | - | - | - | - | - | - |
| | Scott Wood | United States | P.I.G. Racing | 15 | 14 | 16 | 10 | - | - |
| | Scott Wood | United States | Landford Racing | | | | | | | 17 | R16 | - | - | - | - | 10 | R11 | 9 | NS | - | - | - | - | - | - | - | - |
| | Alex Padilla | United States | McNeill Motorsports | - | - | - | - | - | - | 8 | 8 | - | - | - | - | - | - | - | - | - | - | - | - | - | - | - | - |
| | Scott Maxwell | Canada | Landford Racing | - | - | - | - | - | - | - | - | - | - | - | - | - | - | - | - | 15 | 8 | - | - | - | - | - | - |
| | Billy Roe | United States | P.I.G. Racing | - | - | - | - | - | - | - | - | - | - | 11 | 10 | - | - | - | - | - | - | - | - |
| | Billy Roe | United States | McCormack Racing | | | | | | | | | | | | | | | | | | | | | 11 | R11 | - | - |
| 28 | Robert Amrén | Sweden | McNeill Motorsports | - | - | - | - | - | - | - | - | - | - | - | - | - | - | - | - | - | - | - | - | - | - | 16 | 9 |
| | Scott Schubot | United States | TransAtlantic Racing | - | - | - | - | - | - | - | - | - | - | - | - | - | - | - | - | - | - | 17 | 12 | - | - | 14 | 10 |
| 30 | Jack Miller | United States | Miller Racing Team | - | - | - | - | - | - | - | - | - | - | - | - | - | - | 14 | 11 | - | - | 18 | 13 | - | - | - | - |
| - | Rupert Keegan | United Kingdom | Leading Edge Motorsport | 10 | 13 | 10 | R14 | - | - | - | - | - | - | - | - | - | - | - | - | - | - | - | - | - | - | - | - |
| - | Kat Teasdale | Canada | Leading Edge Motorsport | - | - | - | - | - | - | - | - | - | - | - | - | 13 | R14 | - | - | 13 | 14 | - | - | - | - | - | - |
| - | Hervé Regout | Belgium | Fastrak Racing | - | - | - | - | 9 | R14 | - | - | - | - | - | - | - | - | - | - | - | - | - | - | - | - | - | - |
| - | Calvin Fish | United Kingdom | P.I.G. Racing | - | - | - | - | - | - | - | - | - | - | - | - | - | - | - | - | - | - | 12 | 14 | - | - | - | - |
| - | Enrique Contreras | Mexico | TransAtlantic Racing | - | - | - | - | - | - | - | - | - | - | - | - | - | - | - | - | - | - | 16 | R17 | - | - | - | - |
| - | Mario Domínguez | Mexico | Landford Racing | - | - | - | - | - | - | - | - | - | - | - | - | - | - | - | - | - | - | - | - | - | - | 8 | R17 |
| - | Eddie Lawson | United States | Leading Edge Motorsport | - | - | - | - | - | - | - | - | - | - | - | - | - | - | - | - | - | - | - | - | - | - | 11 | R18 |
