= 1991 Indy Lights season =

The 1991 Firestone Indy Lights Championship consisted of 12 races. Éric Bachelart won four races on his way to the championship. He was one of six different winners on the season.

== Calendar ==
Race No	Track	State	Date	Laps	Distance	Time	Speed	Winner	Pole position	Most leading laps	Fastest race lap
1	Long Beach	California	April 14, 1991	45	2.687531=120.938895 km	0'54:36.499	132.880 km/h	Éric Bachelart	Éric Bachelart	Éric Bachelart	?
2	Phoenix	Arizona	April 21, 1991	75	1.6093=120.6975 km	0'38:59.979	185.690 km/h	Robbie Groff	Mark Smith	Mark Smith	?
3	Milwaukee	Wisconsin	June 2, 1991	100	1.6607976=166.07976 km	0'54:47.080	181.890 km/h	Robbie Groff	John Marconi	Robbie Groff	?
4	Detroit	Michigan	June 16, 1991	30	4.02325=120.6975 km	0'56:27.903	128.254 km/h	Éric Bachelart	Éric Bachelart	Éric Bachelart	?
5	Portland	Oregon	June 23, 1991	40	3.0930746=123.722984 km	0'43:54.052	169.094 km/h	Éric Bachelart	P. J. Jones	P. J. Jones	?
6	Cleveland	Ohio	July 7, 1991	32	3.8124317=121.9978144 km	0'38:06.5	192.081 km/h	Mark Smith	Mark Smith	Mark Smith	?
7	Meadowlands	New Jersey	July 14, 1991	63	1.9585181=123.38664 km	0'45:18.60	163.390 km/h	Éric Bachelart	Mark Smith	P. J. Jones	?
8	Toronto	Canada	July 21, 1991	42	2.8709912=120.58163 km	0'47:41.265	151.714 km/h	P. J. Jones	Éric Bachelart	Robbie Buhl	?
9	Denver	Colorado	August 25, 1991	30	3.122042=93.66126 km	0'48:18.360	116.335 km/h	P. J. Jones	Robbie Groff	P. J. Jones	?
10	Mid-Ohio	Ohio	September 15, 1991	34	3.6337994=122.004252 km	0'51:35.404	141.893 km/h	Brian Till	Robbie Buhl	Éric Bachelart	?
11	Nazareth	Pennsylvania	October 6, 1991	75	1.5223978=114.179835 km	0'39:15.623	174.496 km/h	Robbie Buhl	Robbie Groff	Robbie Groff	?
12	Laguna Seca	California	October 20, 1991	34	3.5629902=121.1416668 km	0'49:32.944	146.693 km/h	Mark Smith	Robbie Buhl	Mark Smith	?

== Race summaries ==
=== Long Beach race ===
Held April 14 at Long Beach Street Circuit. Éric Bachelart won the pole.

Top Five Results

1. Éric Bachelart
2. Robbie Buhl
3. Robbie Groff
4. Mark Smith
5. Franck Fréon

=== Phoenix race ===
Held April 21 at Phoenix International Raceway. Mark Smith won the pole.

Top Five Results

1. Robbie Groff
2. Mark Smith
3. Éric Bachelart
4. Tommy Byrne
5. Johnny O'Connell

=== Milwaukee race ===
Held June 2 at The Milwaukee Mile. John Marconi won the pole.

Top Five Results

1. Robbie Groff
2. Éric Bachelart
3. Franck Fréon
4. P. J. Jones
5. John Marconi

=== Detroit race ===
Held June 16 at the Detroit Street Circuit. Éric Bachelart won the pole.

Top Five Results

1. Éric Bachelart
2. Franck Fréon
3. Brian Till
4. Robbie Buhl
5. Robbie Groff

=== Portland race ===
Held June 23 at Portland International Raceway. P. J. Jones won the pole.

Top Five Results

1. Éric Bachelart
2. Franck Fréon
3. Mark Smith
4. Brian Till
5. P. J. Jones

=== Cleveland race ===
Held July 7 at Burke Lakefront Airport. Mark Smith won the pole.

Top Five Results

1. Mark Smith
2. Brian Till
3. Robbie Groff
4. Johnny O'Connell
5. Robbie Buhl

=== Meadowlands race ===
Held July 14 at the Meadowlands Sports Complex. Mark Smith won the pole.

Top Five Results

1. Éric Bachelart
2. P. J. Jones
3. Robbie Buhl
4. Robbie Groff
5. Mark Smith

=== Toronto race ===
Held July 21 at Exhibition Place. Éric Bachelart won the pole.

Top Five Results

1. P. J. Jones
2. Robbie Buhl
3. John Marconi
4. Franck Fréon
5. Mark Smith

=== Denver race ===
Held August 25 at the Denver, Colorado street circuit. Robbie Groff won the pole.

Top Five Results

1. P. J. Jones
2. Éric Bachelart
3. Roberto Quintanilla
4. Mark Smith
5. Brian Till

=== Mid-Ohio race ===
Held September 15 at The Mid-Ohio Sports Car Course. Robbie Buhl won the pole. After a full-course caution to clean up the crash of Robbie Groff on lap 27 (of 34), the race went back to green on lap 30. Eric Bachelart and Robbie Buhl were running 1st-2nd. Going into turn one, Buhl got a jump on the restart, and dove inside. But Bachelart closed the door, and the two cars tangled. Brian Till, running third, slipped by to take the lead. The caution came out and the race finished under yellow. Hometown driver Brian Till won his first career Indy Lights race, with Mark Smith second.

Top Five Results

1. Brian Till
2. Mark Smith
3. Franck Fréon
4. P. J. Jones
5. Roberto Quintanilla

=== Nazareth race ===
Held October 6 at Nazareth Speedway. Robbie Groff won the pole.

Top Five Results

1. Robbie Buhl
2. P. J. Jones
3. Éric Bachelart
4. Brian Till
5. Roberto Quintanilla

=== Laguna Seca race ===
Held October 20 at Laguna Seca Raceway. Robbie Buhl won the pole.

Top Five Results

1. Mark Smith
2. Brian Till
3. Éric Bachelart
4. Mike Snow
5. P. J. Jones

== Final points standings ==
=== Driver ===
For every race the points were awarded: 20 points to the winner, 16 for runner-up, 14 for third place, 12 for fourth place, 10 for fifth place, 8 for sixth place, 6 seventh place, winding down to 1 points for 12th place. Additional points were awarded to the pole winner (1 point) and to the driver leading the most laps (1 point).

Place	Name	Country	Team	Total points	(United States)	(United States)	(United States)	(United States)	(United States)	(United States)	(United States)	(Canada)	(United States)	(United States)	(United States)	(United States)
1	Éric Bachelart	Belgium	Landford Racing	174	22	14	16	22	20	6	20	9	16	1	14	14
2	Mark Smith	United States	Evergreen Racing	155	12	18	6	8	14	22	11	10	12	16	5	21
3	P. J. Jones	United States	Landford Racing	123	-	3	12	-	12	-	17	20	21	12	16	10
4	Franck Fréon	France	Fréon Racing Services	121	10	6	14	16	16	8	8	12	8	14	4	5
5	Brian Till	United States	Cole Performance	120	6	-	8	14	12	16	-	6	10	20	12	16
6	Robbie Buhl	United States	Leading Edge Motorsport	110	16	5	4	12	8	10	14	17	2	1	20	1
7	Robbie Groff	United States	Groff Motorsports	107	14	20	21	10	4	14	12	3	1	-	8	-
8	John Marconi	United States	Marconi Racing/U.S. Racing	54	1	4				4	5	14	5	6	-	3
8	John Marconi	United States	P.I.G. Racing	54			11	-	1
9	Roberto Quintanilla	Mexico	Roquin Motorsports	53	-	-	-	1	2	5	6	5	14	10	10	-
10	Jeff Davis	United States	Leading Edge Motorsport	39	-	-	3	2	3	3	4	4	6	4	8	2
11	Johnny O'Connell	United States	Team Milkhouse	37	4	10	5	-	6	12	-	-	-	-	-	-
12	Tommy Byrne	Ireland	P.I.G. Racing	35	5	12	-	5	5	-	-	-	-	-	-	8
13	Mike Snow	United States	Bradley Motorsports	29	8	-	-	-	-	1	-	-	3	5	-	12
14	Dave Kudrave	United States	Bradley Motorsports	16	-	1	-	6	-	-	-	-	-
14	Dave Kudrave	United States	Regency Racing	16										3	-	6
15	Rob Wilson	New Zealand	McNeill Motorsports	15	3	2
15	Rob Wilson	New Zealand	Stuart Moore Racing	15			2	-	-	-	-	-	-	8	-	-
16	George Sutcliffe	United States	P.I.G. Racing	9	-	8	1	-	-	-	-	-	-	-	-	-
17	Bob Reid	United States	McNeill Motorsports	8	-	-	-	4	-	2	-	-	-
17	Bob Reid	United States	Leading Edge Motorsport	8										2	-	-
18	Scott Backman	United States	John Martin Racing	4	-	-	-	-	-	-	-	-	4	-	-	-
	Page Jones	United States	Bradley Motorsports	4	-	-	-	-	-	-	-	-	-	-	-	4
20	Sandy Dells	United States	Roquin Motorsports	3	-	-	-	3	-	-	-	-	-	-	-	-
	Wayne Cerbo	United States	Stuart Moore Racing	3	-	-	-	-	-	-	3	-	-	-	-	-
22	Marty Roth	Canada	Roquin Motorsports	2	2	-	-	-	-	-	-	-	-	-	-	-
	Bob Doricott Jr.	United States	Cameron-McGee Motorsports	2	-	-	-	-	-	-	-	-	-	1	-	1
24	Desiré Wilson	South Africa	Leading Edge Motorsport	1	-	-	-	-	-	-	-	-	1	-	-	-

Note:

Race 7, 8 and 11 not all points were awarded (not enough competitors).

== Complete Overview ==
first column of every race	10	= grid position

second column of every race	10	= race result

R13=retired, but classified NS=did not start NQ=did not qualify (6)=place after practice, but grid position not held free DIS(10)=disqualified after finishing in tenth place

Place	Name	Country	Team	(United States)		(United States)		(United States)		(United States)		(United States)		(United States)		(United States)		(Canada)		(United States)		(United States)		(United States)		(United States)
1	Éric Bachelart	Belgium	Landford Racing	1	1	2	3	8	2	1	1	3	1	5	7	6	1	1	6	5	2	2	R13	9	3	9	3
2	Mark Smith	United States	Evergreen Racing	10	4	1	2	7	7	7	6	2	3	1	1	1	5	5	5	6	4	8	2	3	R8	3	1
3	P. J. Jones	United States	Landford Racing	3	R15	3	10	3	4	4	R14	1	5	7	R14	2	2	4	1	2	1	6	4	6	2	2	5
4	Franck Fréon	France	Fréon Racing Services	7	5	10	7	4	3	3	2	4	2	9	6	5	6	8	4	8	6	3	3	4	R9	15	8
5	Brian Till	United States	Cole Performance	9	7	4	R15	5	6	5	3	5	4	3	2	(6)	NS	7	7	10	5	4	1	7	4	4	2
6	Robbie Buhl	United States	Leading Edge Motorsport	8	2	11	8	6	9	9	4	9	6	2	5	3	3	2	2	3	R11	1	R14	2	1	1	R17
7	Robbie Groff	United States	Groff Motorsports	6	3	5	1	2	1	11	5	12	9	4	3	4	4	3	R10	1	R13	5	R15	1	R7	5	15
8	John Marconi	United States	Marconi Racing/U.S. Racing	14	12	13	9							8	9	8	8	6	3	7	8	13	7	-	-	13	10
8	John Marconi	United States	P.I.G. Racing					1	5	8	R16	6	R12
9	Roberto Quintanilla	Mexico	Roquin Motorsports	4	R16	-	-	-	-	12	R12	13	11	10	8	7	7	9	8	4	3	7	5	10	5	16	14
10	Jeff Davis	United States	Leading Edge Motorsport	-	-	-	-	10	10	16	11	14	10	11	10	9	9	10	9	9	7	12	9	8	6	12	11
11	Johnny O'Connell	United States	Team Milkhouse	2	9	8	5	12	8	2	R15	11	7	6	4	-	-	-	-	-	-	-	-	-	-	-	-
12	Tommy Byrne	Ireland	P.I.G. Racing	5	8	7	4	-	-	6	R8	7	8	-	-	-	-	-	-	-	-	-	-	-	-	11	6
13	Mike Snow	United States	Bradley Motorsports	11	6	9	13	-	-	13	13	10	R14	13	12	(10)	NS	-	-	13	10	10	8	5	DIS(10)	7	4
14	Dave Kudrave	United States	Bradley Motorsports	15	R18	6	R12	-	-	10	7	8	R13	-	-	-	-	-	-	-	-
14	Dave Kudrave	United States	Regency Racing																			11	10	-	-	4	7
15	Rob Wilson	New Zealand	McNeill Motorsports	12	10	12	11
15	Rob Wilson	New Zealand	Stuart Moore Racing					11	11	-	-	-	-	-	-	-	-	-	-	-	-	9	6	-	-	14	16
16	George Sutcliffe	United States	P.I.G. Racing	16	13	15	6	9	R12	-	-	-	-	-	-	-	-	-	-	-	-	-	-	-	-	-	-
17	Bob Reid	United States	McNeill Motorsports	-	-	-	-	-	-	14	9	-	-	14	11	-	-	-	-	-	-
17	Bob Reid	United States	Leading Edge Motorsport																			14	11	-	-	-	-
18	Scott Backman	United States	John Martin Racing	-	-	-	-	-	-	-	-	-	-	-	-	-	-	-	-	12	9	-	-	-	-	-	-
	Page Jones	United States	Bradley Motorsports	-	-	-	-	-	-	-	-	-	-	-	-	-	-	-	-	-	-	-	-	-	-	8	9
20	Sandy Dells	United States	Roquin Motorsports	-	-	-	-	-	-	15	10	-	-	-	-	-	-	-	-	-	-	-	-	-	-	-	-
	Wayne Cerbo	United States	Stuart Moore Racing	-	-	-	-	-	-	-	-	-	-	12	13	10	R10	-	-	-	-	-	-	-	-	-	-
22	Marty Roth	Canada	Roquin Motorsports	13	11	-	-	-	-	-	-	-	-	-	-	-	-	-	-	-	-	-	-	-	-	-	-
	Bob Doricott Jr.	United States	Cameron-McGee Motorsports	-	-	-	-	-	-	-	-	-	-	-	-	-	-	-	-	-	-	15	12	-	-	17	12
24	Desiré Wilson	South Africa	Leading Edge Motorsport	-	-	-	-	-	-	-	-	-	-	-	-	-	-	-	-	11	R12	-	-	-	-	-	-
-	Hugh O'Neill	United States	Sandy Dells Racing	-	-	-	-	-	-	-	-	-	-	-	-	-	-	-	-	-	-	-	-	-	-	10	13
-	Cheryl Glass	United States	Glass Racing	18	R17	14	R14	-	-	-	-	-	-	-	-	-	-	-	-	-	-	-	-	-	-	-	-
-	Mark Ritchey	United States	Leading Edge Motorsport	17	14	-	-	-	-	-	-	-	-	-	-	-	-	-	-	-	-	-	-	-	-	-	-
-	Ken Murillo	United States	?	19	NQ	-	-	-	-	-	-	-	-	-	-	-	-	-	-	-	-	-	-	-	-	-	-
