= Kurt Roehrig =

J. Kurt Roehrig (28 October 1956 – 22 July 2024) was a motorsports engineer and racing driver. Roehrig was the head of former NASCAR Cup Series team Roehrig Motorsports. Roehrig himself has raced in various series such as the IMSA GT Championship.

== Racing career ==
=== Sports car racing ===
Kurt Roehrig started racing cars in the late 1970s alongside his brother J. Dana Roehrig. The brothers raced in the 1978 IMSA GT Championship. In a Porsche 911, the duo worked their way up to 18th place after starting 43rd in the 20th Annual Daytona Fire Cracker 400. His debut at the 24 Hours of Daytona, in 1979 ended after 223 laps. For the occasion, Roehrig joined Dave White and John Hamilton at D.R. Racing. The following year, Roehrig and White, joined by Canadian Francois Laurin failed to qualify their BMW 320i. In 1980, Roehrig also raced a Ford Capri RS 2600 entered by Clay Dopke. Together with Dopke, the duo finished twelfth at Lime Rock Park. In 1981, Roehrig achieved his best result at the 24 Hours of Daytona. Roehrig joined Kent Racing along with Walt Bohren and Jim Mullen. The team finished tenth overall, fifth in the GTU class.

Roehrig made his first of many Trans-Am Series starts in 1984. At Watkins Glen International, Roehrig was entered by Lou Infante Motoracing in a Buick Regal Turbo. The Michigan registered driver started 21st but finished in eighteenth place. A second race in the series saw Roehrig retire with fuel press issues.

=== Single seaters ===
To promote Roehrig Engineering Inc. Kurt entered a number of single seater races. The Michigan-based racing driver entered the inaugural Barber Saab Pro Series season in 1986. This resulted in a twelfth place in the season standings. Roehrig also attempted to enter the Atlantic Championship East division race at the Grand Prix of St. Petersburg. As his Ralt RT1 encountered engine trouble he was unable to start the race. His most recent single seater starts were in 2004. Roehrig made six race starts in the Star Mazda series. His best results was a sixteenth place at Mazda Raceway Laguna Seca.

== NASCAR team owner ==
Roehrig started a team to enter the inaugural season of the NASCAR SuperTruck Series in 1995. Johnny Benson Jr. was the first driver for the number 18 Chevrolet C/K finishing tenth at the season opener. The team scored some impressive results but the major sponsor, Pennzoil, pulled back. Therefore the team was on the brink of bankruptcy by December 1996. The team received an impulse when Dana Corp. signed a sponsorship deal with the team. Also the team switched to Dodge engines. After a late Pennzoil sponsorship deal the team ended up entering two Dodge trucks. One truck was driven by Michael Dokken, the other by rookie Tony Raines. The team scored its first win at the Western Auto/Parts America 200 at I-70 Speedway. The following season Raines won three races for the Roehrig team. After the 1998 season Dana Corp. switched teams sponsoring Bobby Hamilton Racing.

In 1998 the team made its NASCAR Cup Series start. Raines raced for the Ford team as well as Tom Hubert and Robby Gordon. The team attempted to make their debut at the 1998 Las Vegas 400 with Raines but they failed to qualify. The following season the team only entered Hubert for one race. Hubert finished 28th at Las Vegas Motor Speedway.

For the 2000 NASCAR Winston Cup Series season Roehrig joined forces with former Olympic athlete Jackie Joyner-Kersee. The team launched Joyner-Kersee Roehrig Motorsports. The team had a troubled start. David Green was signed to race in the Daytona 500 and preliminary Bud Shootout. Green finished the Bud Shootout in twelfth place. The team did not attempt at qualifying for the Daytona 500 race. The team folded afterwards.

== Personal ==
Kurt Roehrig was born to William and Martha Crocker Roehrig on October 28, 1956, in San Francisco. He has two brothers, Mark and James, the latter who predeceased him. William, Kurt’s father died in 2000, and his mother died in 2008. Most of his childhood and younger adult life he spent living in St. Petersburg, Florida.

Roehrig graduated from Kettering University in 1980 in the field of Mechanical Engineering. In 1983, he joined McLaren Engines Inc. (currently a subsidiary of Linamar). Roehring formed his own company, Roehrig Engineering Inc., in 1987.

Roehrig met his wife Carmella in Michigan and they had two children, Madison and Max. He later moved to Greensboro, North Carolina, where he spent the remainder of his life.

Following an extended illness, Roehirg died in 2024, in Greensboro, at the age of 67.

== Racing results ==
=== SCCA National Championship Runoffs ===
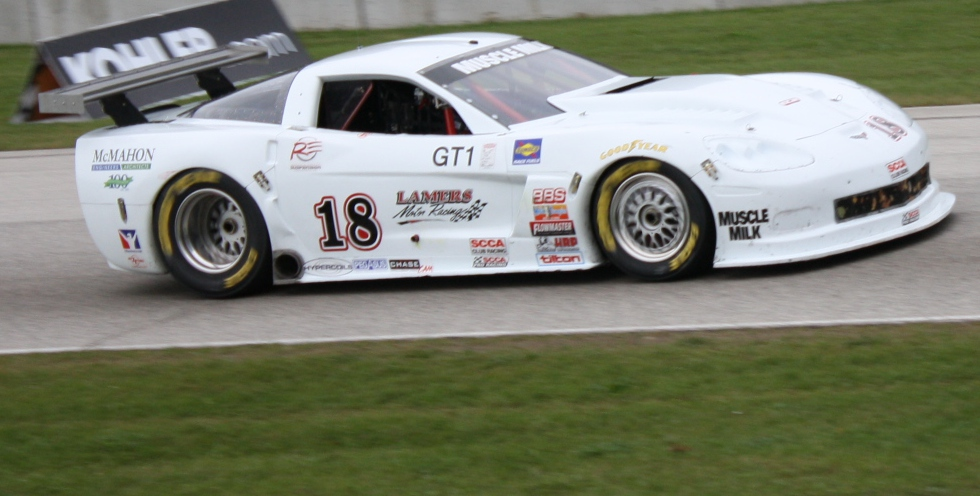
Roehrig at 2009 Runoffs

Year	Track	Car	Engine	Class	Finish	Start	Status
2009	Road America	Chevrolet Corvette		GT1	20	10	Retired
2013	Road America	Chevrolet Camaro		GT2			Did not start

=== American Open-Wheel racing results ===
(key) (Races in bold indicate pole position, races in italics indicate fastest race lap)

=== ECAR HFC Pro Series Atlantic Challenge ===
Year	Team	1	2	3	4	5	6	7	8	9	Rank	Points
1987		(United States); ATL1	(Canada); MOS	(United States); WGI	(United States); BRA	(United States); LRP	(United States); ROA	(United States); MOH	(United States); ATL2	(United States); STP; DNS	N.R.	0

==== Star Mazda Championship ====
Year	Team	1	2	3	4	5	6	7	8	9	10	Rank	Points
2004	Formula Cars East	(United States); SEB; 17	(United States); MOH; 27	(United States); LRP; 19	(United States); SON	(United States); POR	(Canada); MOS	(United States); ROA; 31	(United States); ATL; 25	(United States); PIR	(United States); LAG; 16	28th	92
