= Brian Till =

American racing driver

- Born: March 26, 1960 (age 66) Houston, Texas, U.S.
- Retired: 1995

CART World Series
- Years active: 1992–1995
- Teams: Robco Racing; Turley Motorsports; Dale Coyne Racing; A. J. Foyt Enterprises
- Starts: 20
- Wins: 0
- Poles: 0
- Best finish: 9th in 1993

Previous series
- 1991 1990 1986, 1989: Indy Lights; North American Formula Atlantic (East); Barber Saab Pro Series

Championship titles
- 1990: North American Formula Atlantic East Series Champion

Brian Till (born March 26, 1960, in Houston, Texas), is an American former racing driver who formerly competed in the CART Championship Car series. He raced in the 1992–1995 seasons with 20 career starts.

== Racing career ==
Till had success early being named Rookie of the Year of the Houston Region of the SCCA in 1986. Not long after, he won the 1990 Atlantic Championship with race engineer, Gerald Tyler. In 1991, he joined the Indy Lights series, again with Tyler and won the race at Mid-Ohio. In CART he ran 20 races with Tyler, including the 1994 Indianapolis 500, where he finished 12th. Till had three top-ten finishes in CART competition.

Till drove full-time in the Trans-Am Series in 1995 and finished ninth in points.

== Broadcasting career ==
After retiring as a professional driver, Till worked for the American Le Mans Series as a pit reporter for coverage of endurance sports car races and an instructor at the Mid-Ohio High Performance Driving school near Lexington, Ohio.

Currently, Till is contracted to NBC Sports but has also worked sports car and NASCAR Camping World Truck Series broadcasts for Fox Sports. On NBCSN, Till has filled in on the network's IndyCar coverage, particularly on weekends of both an IndyCar and Formula One race on the network. He has been play-by-play announcer on at least one IndyCar Series race per season since 2012.

== Racing record ==
=== SCCA National Championship Runoffs ===
Year	Track	Car	Engine	Class	Finish	Start	Status
1985	Road Atlanta	Spec Racer	Renault	Spec Racer Renault	23	9	Running

=== American Open Wheel ===
(key)

==== CART ====
Year	Team	1	2	3	4	5	6	7	8	9	10	11	12	13	14	15	16	17	Rank	Points	Ref
1992	Robco Racing	SRF	PHX	LBH; 11	INDY	DET; 23	POR; 20	MIL	NHA; 12	TOR; 10	MIC	CLE; 15	ROA; 11	VAN	MDO; 14	NAZ	LS; 27		23rd	8	
1993	Turley Motorsports	SRF	PHX	LBH	INDY	MIL	DET	POR; 22	CLE; 9	TOR; 13	MIC	NHA; 10	ROA; 22	VAN	MDO; 17	NAZ; 16	LS; 29		25th	7	
1994	Dale Coyne Racing	SRF	PHX; 19	LBH	INDY; 12	MIL	DET	POR	CLE	TOR	MIC	MDO	NHA	VAN	ROA	NAZ	LS		33rd	1	
1995	A. J. Foyt Enterprises	MIA	SRF	PHX	LBH	NAZ	INDY	MIL	DET	POR	ROA	TOR	CLE	MIC	MDO	NHA	VAN; 26	LS	45th	0	

Sporting positions
Preceded by Jocko Cunningham	North American Formula Atlantic; Atlantic Division Champion; 1990	Succeeded by Jovy Marcelo (Combined championship)
