= Formula F at the SCCA National Championship Runoffs =

SCCA National Championship Runoffs

Formula F
- Venue: Road America
- Location: Town of Plymouth, Sheboygan County, at N7390 Highway 67, Elkhart Lake, Wisconsin, United States; 43°47′51″N 87°59′38″W
- First race: 1969
- Most wins (driver): (United States) Dave Weitzenhof (4) (United States) Jonathan Kotyk (4)
- Most wins (manufacturer): Swift Engineering (16)

Circuit information
- Surface: Asphalt
- Length: 6.515 km (4.048 mi)
- Turns: 14

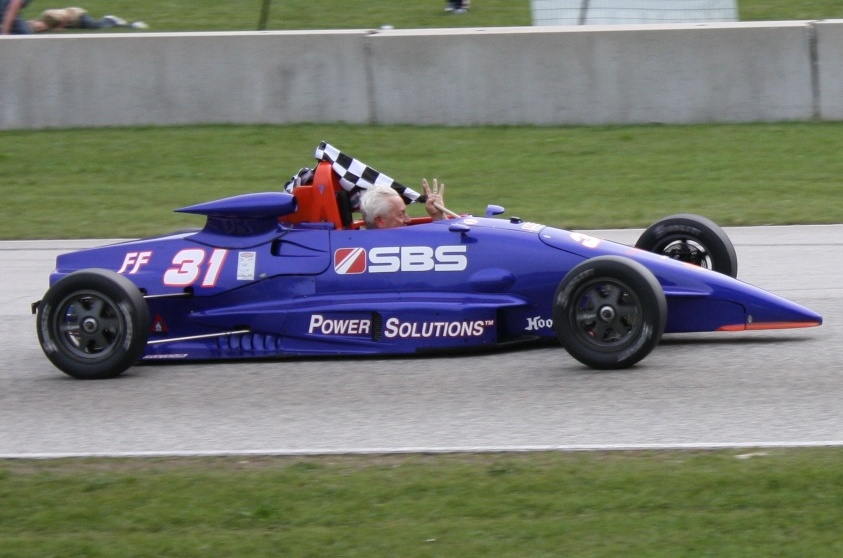
2009 Formula F winner Scott Rubenzer Runoffs winner at Road America

Formula F is one of the oldest classes competed at the SCCA National Championship Runoffs.

Formula Ford was first introduced at the Runoffs in 1969 at Daytona. The first edition featured 21 drivers with Skip Barber winning the race and scoring the fastest lap. Most cars in the field were imported British Formula Ford cars such as the Merlyn, Lotus and Royale. Barber also won the second edition in 1970. The following decades saw many racing drivers competed in various different racing chassis. Dave Weitzenhof is the most successful driver in the class winning four times, each at Road Atlanta.

The introduction of the Swift DB1 in 1983 started an era of dominance. The chassis type won the race ten times. The chassis type also won ten consecutive pole positions between 1983 and 1992. In 2009 the Honda L engine was introduced alongside the Ford Kent engine and Ford Cortina engine. In 2012 the first Formula F Runoffs was won by a Honda engine.

== Race winners ==
Year	Track	Winner	Car	Engine
Formula Ford
1969	Daytona	(United States) Skip Barber	Caldwell D9	Ford Kent
1970	Road Atlanta	(United States) Skip Barber	Tecno	Ford Kent
1971	Road Atlanta	(United States) Jim Harrell	Titan Mk.6A	Ford Kent
1972	Road Atlanta	(United States) Eddie Miller	Hawke DL2B	Ford Kent
1973	Road Atlanta	(United States) Bob Earl	ADF	Ford Kent
1974	Road Atlanta	(United States) Eddie Miller	Lola T340	Ford Kent
1975	Road Atlanta	(United States) Tom Wiechmann	ADF Mk.II	Ford Kent
1976	Road Atlanta	(New Zealand) Dennis Firestone	Crosslé 30F	Ford Kent
1977	Road Atlanta	(United States) Dave Weitzenhof	Zink Z10	Ford Kent
1978	Road Atlanta	(United States) David Loring	Eagle	Ford Kent
1979	Road Atlanta	(United States) Dave Weitzenhof	Zink Z10	Ford Kent
1980	Road Atlanta	(United States) Bob Lobenberg	ADF Mk.II	Ford Kent
1981	Road Atlanta	(United States) Dave Weitzenhof	Citation-Zink Z16	Ford Kent
1982	Road Atlanta	(United States) Bob Lobenberg	ADF Mk.II	Ford Kent
1983	Road Atlanta	(United States) R.K. Smith	Swift DB1	Ford Kent
1984	Road Atlanta	(United States) Jackson Younge	Reynard 84F	Ford Kent
1985	Road Atlanta	(United States) Scott Atchison	Swift DB1	Ford Kent
1986	Road Atlanta	(United States) Jimmy Vasser	Swift DB1	Ford Kent
1987	Road Atlanta	(United States) Dave Weitzenhof	Citation Centurian	Ford Kent
1988	Road Atlanta	(United States) Kenny Hendrick	Swift DB1	Ford Kent
1989	Road Atlanta	(United States) Richard Bahmer	Swift DB1	Ford Kent
1990	Road Atlanta	(United States) Tony Kester	Reynard FF88-X	Ford Kent
1991	Road Atlanta	(United States) Richard Schroebel	Swift DB1	Ford Kent
1992	Road Atlanta	(United States) C.T. Hancock	Swift DB1	Ford Kent
1993	Road Atlanta	(United States) Anthony Lazzaro	Van Diemen RF93	Ford Kent
1994	Mid-Ohio	(United States) John Fillipakis	Swift DB1	Ford Kent
1995	Mid-Ohio	(United States) Bruce May	Swift DB1	Ford Kent
1996	Mid-Ohio	(United States) Bruce May	Swift DB1	Ford Kent
1997	Mid-Ohio	(United States) John LaRue	Citation	Ford Kent
1998	Mid-Ohio	(United States) Keith Nunes	Swift DB6	Ford Kent
1999	Mid-Ohio	(United States) Keith Nunes	Swift DB6	Ford Kent
2000	Mid-Ohio	(United States) Chris Winkler	Van Diemen RF99	Ford Kent
2001	Mid-Ohio	(United States) Kyle Krisiloff	Van Diemen RF01	Ford Kent
2002	Mid-Ohio	(United States) Justin Pritchard	Piper DF5	Ford Kent
2003	Mid-Ohio	(United States) Justin Pritchard	Piper DF5	Ford Kent
2004	Mid-Ohio	(United States) Scott Rarick	Swift DB6	Ford Kent
2005	Mid-Ohio	(United States) John Robinson II	Swift DB6	Ford Kent
2006	Heartland Park Topeka	(United States) Thomas Schweitz	Piper	Ford Kent
2007	Heartland Park Topeka	(United States) John Robinson II	Swift DB6	Ford Kent
2008	Heartland Park Topeka	(United States) Chris Keller	Swift DB6	Ford Kent
Formula F
2009	Road America	(United States) Scott Rubenzer	Citation 95FF	Ford Kent
2010	Road America	(United States) Tim Kautz	Piper DF3D	Ford Kent
2011	Road America	(United States) Lewis Cooper III	Van Diemen RF00	Ford Kent
2012	Road America	(United States) Tim Kautz	Piper DF3D	Honda L15A7
2013	Road America	(United States) Tim Kautz	Piper DF3D	Honda L15A7
2014	Laguna Seca	(United States) Jeremy Grenier	Citation	Honda L15A7
2015	Daytona	(Canada) Rick Payne	Van Diemen RF99	Honda L15A7
2016	Mid-Ohio	(United States) Neil Verhagen	Mygale SJ11	Honda L15A7
2017	Indianapolis	(United Kingdom) Matthew Cowley	Mygale SJ11	Honda L15A7
2018	Sonoma	(United States) Jonathan Kotyk	Mygale	Honda L15A7
2019	VIR	(United States) Jonathan Kotyk	Mygale	Honda L15A7
2020	Road America	(United States) Simon Sikes	Mygale SJ12	Honda L15A7
2021	Indianapolis	(United States) Jonathan Kotyk	Mygale SJ11	Honda L15A7
2022	VIR	(United States) Jonathan Kotyk	Mygale	Honda L15A7
2023	VIR	(United States) Nolan Allaer	Van Diemen RF00	Ford Kent
2024	Road America	(United States) Tazio Stefanelli	Spectrum	Honda L15A7
2025	Road America	(United Kingdom) Nathan Down	Swift DB6	Honda L15A7
2026	Road America	(United States) David Ybarra	Mygale SJ14	Honda L15A7

== See also ==
- F1600 Championship Series
