= Robbie Groff =

American racing driver

Robert Clayton Groff (born January 31, 1966, in Mission Hills, California), is a former driver in the Indy Racing League and CART Championship Car series and is brother of Mike Groff. He raced in the 1994 CART season and 1997-1998 IRL seasons with nine combined starts. His best career finish was in his first race, a ninth place at the 1997 Indianapolis 500.

== Motorsports Career Results ==
=== American Open-Wheel racing results ===
(key) (Races in bold indicate pole position)

==== American Racing Series / Indy Lights ====
Year	Team	1	2	3	4	5	6	7	8	9	10	11	12	13	14	Rank	Points
1990	Groff Motorsports	PHX; 8	LBH; 6	MIL; 3	DET; 7	POR; 12	CLE; 9	MEA; 9	TOR; DNS	DEN; 10	VAN	MDO; 3	ROA; 5	NAZ; 1	LS; 3	**5th**	**104**
1991	Groff Motorsports	LBH; 3	PHX; 1	MIL; 1	DET; 5	POR; 9	CLE; 3	MEA; 4	TOR; 10	**DEN**; 13	MDO; 15	**NAZ**; 7	LS; 15			**7th**	**107**
1992	Groff Motorsports	PHX; 2	LBH; 2	DET; 15	POR; 4	MIL; 2	NHA; 12	TOR; 5	CLE	VAN; 10	MDO; 1	NAZ; 4	**LS**; 1			**4th**	**128**
1993	Bradley Motorsports	PHX; 3	LBH; 5	MIL; 15	DET; 3	POR; 14	CLE; 4	TOR; 5								**5th**	**103**
1993	Groff Motorsports								NHA; 2	VAN; 16	MDO; 19	NAZ; 4	LS; 3			**5th**	**103**

==== CART Indy Car World Series ====
Year	Team	Chassis	Engine	1	2	3	4	5	6	7	8	9	10	11	12	13	14	15	16	Rank	Points	Ref
1994	Bettenhausen Motorsports	Penske PC-22	Ilmor 265C/D V8t	SRF	PHX	LBH; 13	IND	MIL	DET	POR; 13	CLE	TOR	MIC	MDO	NHA	VAN	ROA	NAZ	LS	**34th**	**0**	

==== Indy Racing League ====
Year	Team	Chassis	No.	Engine	1	2	3	4	5	6	7	8	9	10	11	Rank	Points
1996-97	McCormack Motorsports	G-Force GF01	30	Oldsmobile Aurora V8	NHM	LVS	WDW	PHX	INDY; 9	TXS; 15	PPIR; 10	CLT; 13	NH2; 10	LV2; 18		**20th**	**135**
1998	Blueprint Racing	Dallara IR8	27	Oldsmobile Aurora V8	WDW; 28	PHX; DNQ	INDY	TXS	NHM	DOV	CLT	PPIR	ATL	TX2	LSV	**41st**	**2**

Years	Teams	Races	Poles	Wins	Podiums (Non-win)	Top 10s (Non-podium)	Indianapolis 500 Wins	Championships
2	2	7	0	0	0	3	0	0
