= Indy NXT =

American automobile racing series

- Category: Open wheel cars
- Country: United States
- Inaugural season: 1977 (predecessor); 1986 (original); 2002 (IndyCar sanctioned)
- Chassis suppliers: Dallara
- Engine suppliers: Mazda–AER (2015–2018); AER (2019–present)
- Tire suppliers: Firestone
- Drivers' champion: (United States) Nikita Johnson
- Teams' champion: (United States) Cape Motorsports Powered by ECR
- Official website: indynxt.com

Indy NXT (pronounced "Indy Next"), previously Indy Lights, is an American developmental automobile racing series sanctioned by IndyCar, currently known as INDY NXT by Firestone for sponsorship reasons. Indy NXT is the highest step on the Road to Indy, a program of racing series leading up to the IndyCar Series.

A similar series named Indy Lights filled the developmental role for the CART series, and ran from 1986 to 1993 as the American Racing Series and Dayton Indy Lights from 1991 to 2001. The current IndyCar sanctioned series was founded in 2002 as the Infiniti Pro Series as a way to introduce new talent to IndyCar, with the moniker Indy Lights returning in 2008 when CART and IndyCar unified. The Indy Lights champion was awarded a $1M scholarship toward the IndyCar Series, and guaranteed three races including the Indianapolis 500 during this time. For 2023, Penske Entertainment announced a rebranding to the name Indy NXT.

== Early origins ==
In the post-WWII era, through the early 1960s, American open-wheel racing cars were almost exclusively front-engined "roadsters". The primary ladder series included sprints and midgets. By the end of the 1960s, the cars evolved into rear-engine formula-style machines. Likewise, the feeder series began to follow the same mold. When United States Automobile Club (USAC) became the primary sanctioning body for top-level open-wheel racing, the ladder of progression began to change.

=== USAC Mini Indy Series ===
The Sports Car Club of America (SCCA) Super Vee and Formula Atlantic series were among the first formula-based ladder series. However, neither had any direct tie to USAC. In 1977, USAC started the "Mini-Indy" series, using Super Vee machines. The series ended after 1980 when USAC stopped sanctioning Indy car races outside of the Indianapolis 500.

Following the end of the "Mini Indy" series, the driver pool in the early 1980s for CART and the Indy 500 was drawn in a somewhat unorganized fashion among Super Vees, Atlantics, former Can-Am drivers, sprint cars, midgets, and even stock cars and off-road racing. In addition, a number of CART series drivers during the 1980s and early 1990s were former Formula 1 competitors, most of whom had climbed the European-based ladder series.

== Original series (1986–2001) ==
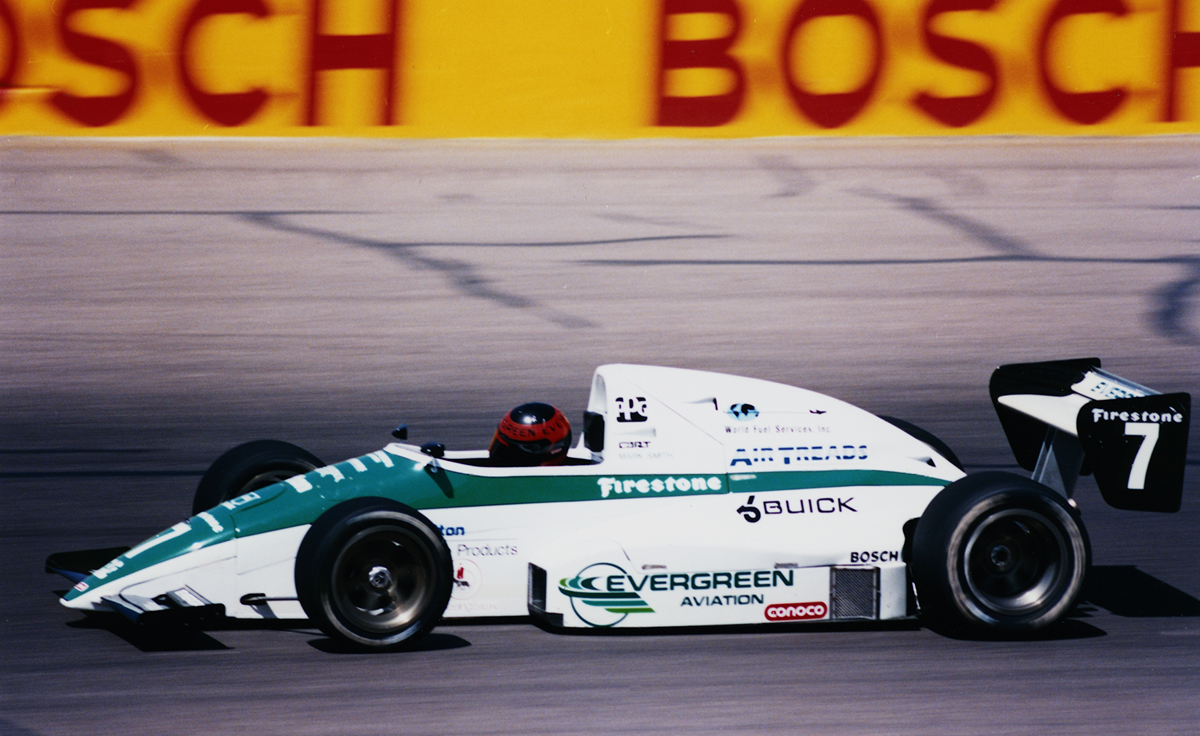
Mark Smith racing an Indy Lights car at Phoenix International Raceway in 1991.

The original Indy Lights series was an open-wheeled racing series that acted as a developmental circuit for CART from 1986 to 2001. It was founded in 1986 as the American Racing Series (ARS). CART became the sanctioning body for the series in 1988, and it was renamed as Indy Lights in 1991, with title sponsorship by Firestone. Later, Firestone's subsidiary Dayton Tires took over as tire supplier and title sponsor.

A spec-series, CART Indy Lights used March chassis (essentially a modified 85B Formula 3000 chassis, renamed to Wildcat) from 1986 to 1992. In 1992 Lola became the primary chassis constructor to the series, using a modified F3000 chassis. In 1997, a newly updated and modern-looking chassis was introduced based on an F3000 design. It would remain through 2001. Buick V6 engines were used for its entire existence.

The ARS/Indy Lights series' championship winners included two CART champions, two IndyCar Series champions, seven Champ Car World Series race-winners and two Formula One drivers.

The Indy Lights schedule closely followed that of the CART series, and typically had a gap of up to a month while the primary CART teams raced at the Indy 500. The races were usually held the morning of the CART series races, as an undercard event. In early years, the Indy Lights series skipped superspeedway races such as Michigan, but eventually found its way to race there. In some rare occasions, the Indy Lights ran at non-CART tracks, generally as a support race to a series other than CART. In 2001 Indy Lights ran at Road Atlanta the weekend of the Petit Le Mans, and ran at Kansas with the IRL.

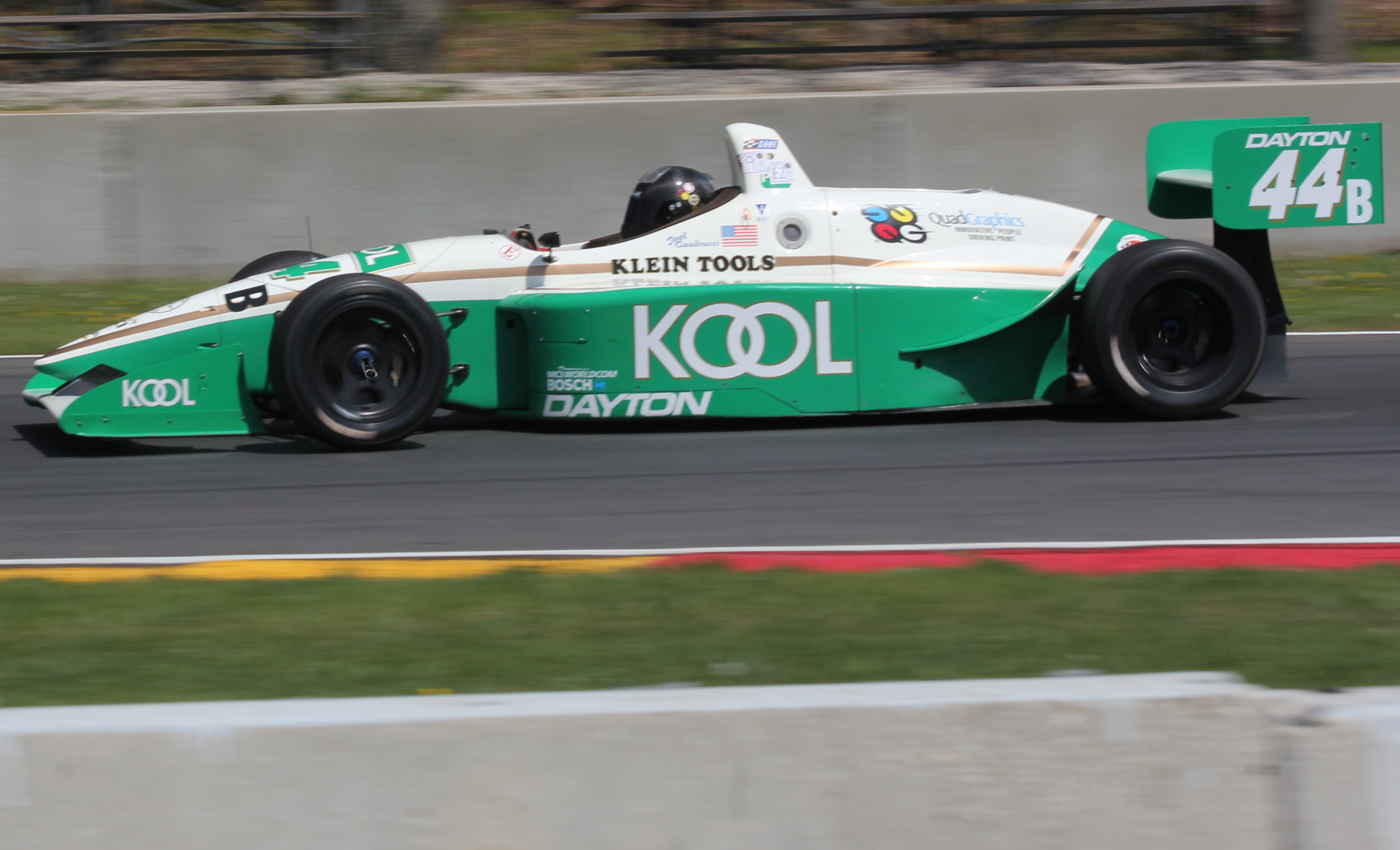
The Lola T97/20 was the specified chassis used from 1997 to 2001. It is pictured here at a vintage racing event in 2016.

By the late 1990s and early 2000s, CART was suffering from financial problems. Meanwhile, in 1996, the rival Indy Racing League was formed. CART canceled the minor league outright after the 2001 season. By this time, the Toyota Atlantic series was equally effective in providing CART with new drivers. In addition, the Atlantics served as a springboard for such drivers as Greg Ray, Sam Hornish Jr. and Richie Hearn to enter the IRL. The Atlantics effectively became CART's primary feeder system, and later became Champ Car World Series' official in-house feeder championship for a time.

== Current series (2002–present) ==
The Infiniti Pro Series was re-founded by the Indy Racing League and began racing in 2002, the year after the CART-sanctioned Indy Lights series' demise. It was a spec series using a TWR (Tom Walkinshaw Racing) developed 3.5L version of the V8 engine used in the Infiniti Q45 combined with Dallara chassis producing 420 horsepower (310 kW). The series initially struggled to attract drivers and some races have had fewer than 10 entrants. However, with the introduction of a number of road-course races to the schedule in 2005, many of America's top prospects like Marco Andretti and Phil Giebler were attracted to the series to run part-time schedules on road courses. In 2006, a boost in prize money even further increased car counts to 16 or more, with an even six oval and six road course mix. The selected races being double races, and a stand-alone race (independent of the IndyCar Series) were scheduled on the USGP weekend.

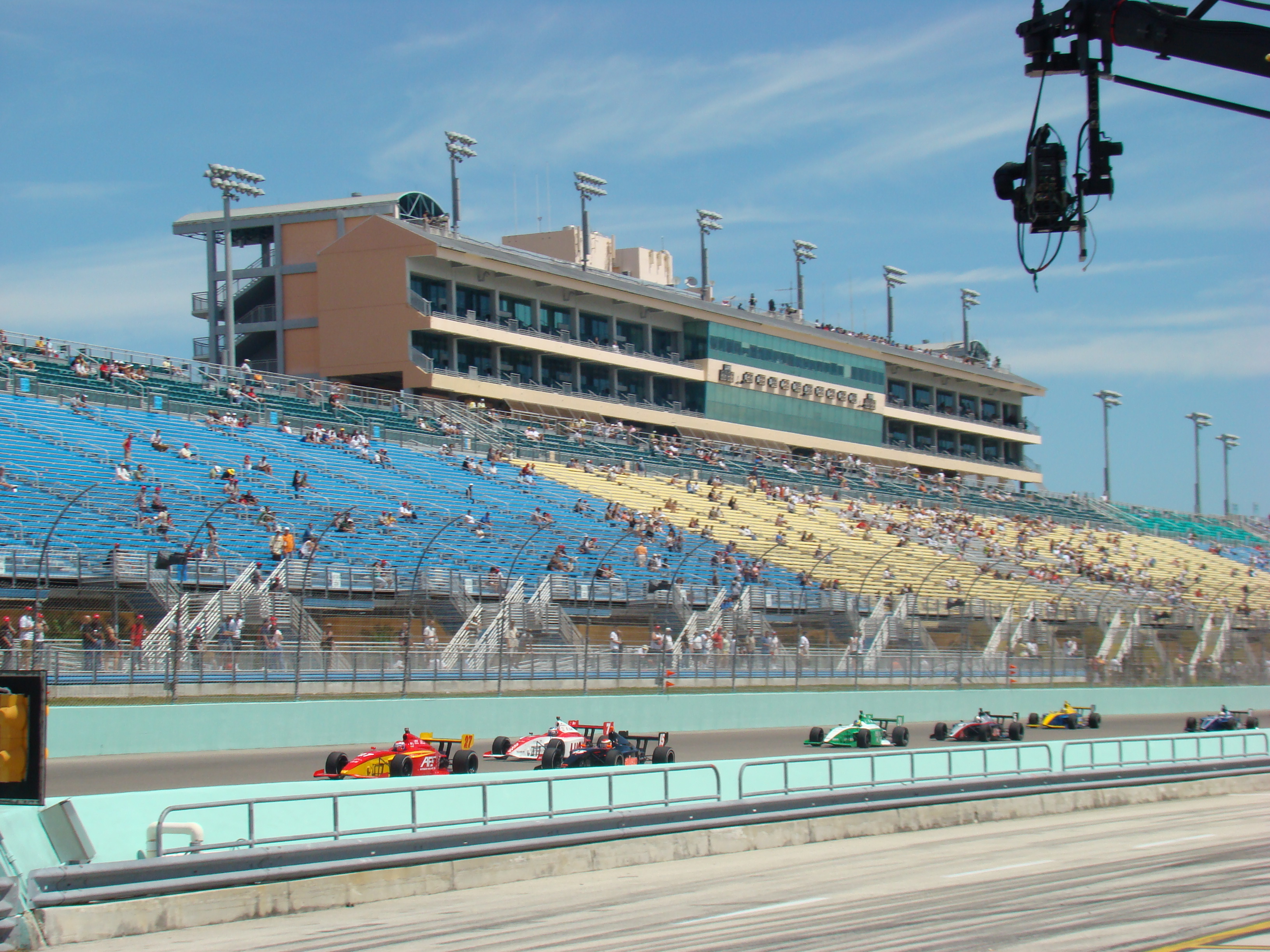
Green flag for the 2008 Miami 100 at the Homestead-Miami Speedway.

The series was called the Menards Infiniti Pro Series (MIPS) until 2006 when both Menards and Nissan dropped their sponsorship of the series. It was then known as the Indy Pro Series. On March 26, 2008, the series announced a changing of names, when the historical records and proprietary information of Champ Car were acquired by the IRL. The series then became known as Firestone Indy Lights.

The centerpiece of the Indy Lights schedule was the Freedom 100, contested at Indianapolis Motor Speedway on the Friday prior to the Indianapolis 500. The series also held a support race for the U.S. Grand Prix, the Liberty Challenge, from 2005 to 2007. It was the series' first event that was not a support race to an IndyCar event.

On September 9, 2007, during the Chicagoland 100, Logan Gomez beat Alex Lloyd by 0.0005 seconds (approximately 1.65 inches (42 mm) at 188 mph) which reflects what was the closest recognized finish in the over century-long history of organized automobile racing throughout the world, until the 2018 PowerShares QQQ 300. In 2008, the margin was established by the Guinness Book of World Records as the closest finish ever in a car race.

On May 24, 2013, Peter Dempsey captured his first Indy Lights win in the Freedom 100 in the closest finish in Indianapolis Motor Speedway history (0.0026 secs) in a four-wide finish.

In June 2013, it was announced that the series would be promoted by Andersen Promotions beginning in 2014. with IndyCar sanctioning remaining. In August it was announced that Cooper Tire would replace Firestone as the official tire of the series in 2014. This resulted in all three levels of the Road to Indy leading up to the IndyCar Series being promoted by Andersen and feature Cooper tires, beginning in 2014. The Andersen team implemented a number of cost-reducing updates to the chassis and engine package in 2014 and introduced a new chassis and engine combination in 2015. On October 31, 2013, the series announced that Dallara would be the manufacturer of the fourth-generation Indy Lights chassis and it would be named the Dallara IL-15. On November 1, 2013, a new logo was unveiled for the Indy Lights series On November 26 it was announced that the engine for the new package would be a 2.0L turbocharged MZR-R four cylinder engine, tuned to last a full season of competition and producing 450 horsepower, with push-to-pass offering an additional 50 horsepower.

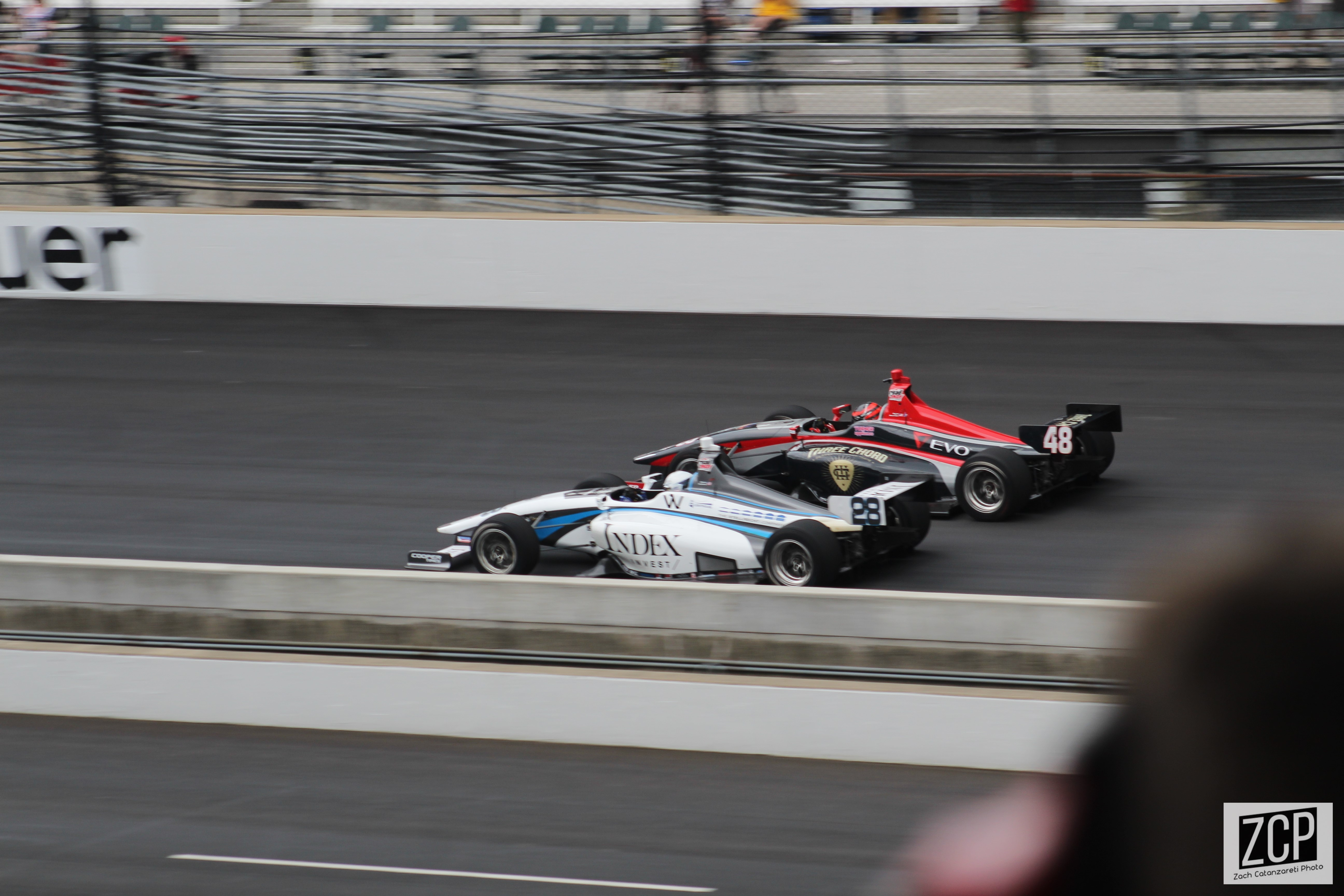
Indy Lights racing at 2019 Freedom 100

The 2020 season was canceled through a combination of low grid numbers and the COVID-19 pandemic.

As of 2021, the Dallara IL-15 continues to be the chassis employed by the series, but engines are now provided by AER, Advanced Engines Research, modifying and tuning base 2.0 liter I-4 Mazda power plants turbocharged to provide the same power and push-to-pass capability of the former engines, with the added capability of longevity: the engines are designed and fabricated to run an entire season without a rebuild. A halo was added to the IL-15 for the 2021 season.

Andretti Autosport's Kyle Kirkwood captured the 2021 series championship, while HMD Motorsports' David Malukas finished second and Global Racing Group w/HMD Motorsports' Linus Lundqvist was third. HMD Motorsports/Global Racing Group secured their first Road to Indy team championship.

Firestone returned as the official tire supplier for the 2023 season. That season saw the series name changed to Indy NXT, and IndyCar assume direct operation of the series from Andersen Promotions, which continues to operate the affiliated lower-tier USF Championships under IndyCar sanctioning.

== Specifications ==
=== Specifications (2002–2014) ===
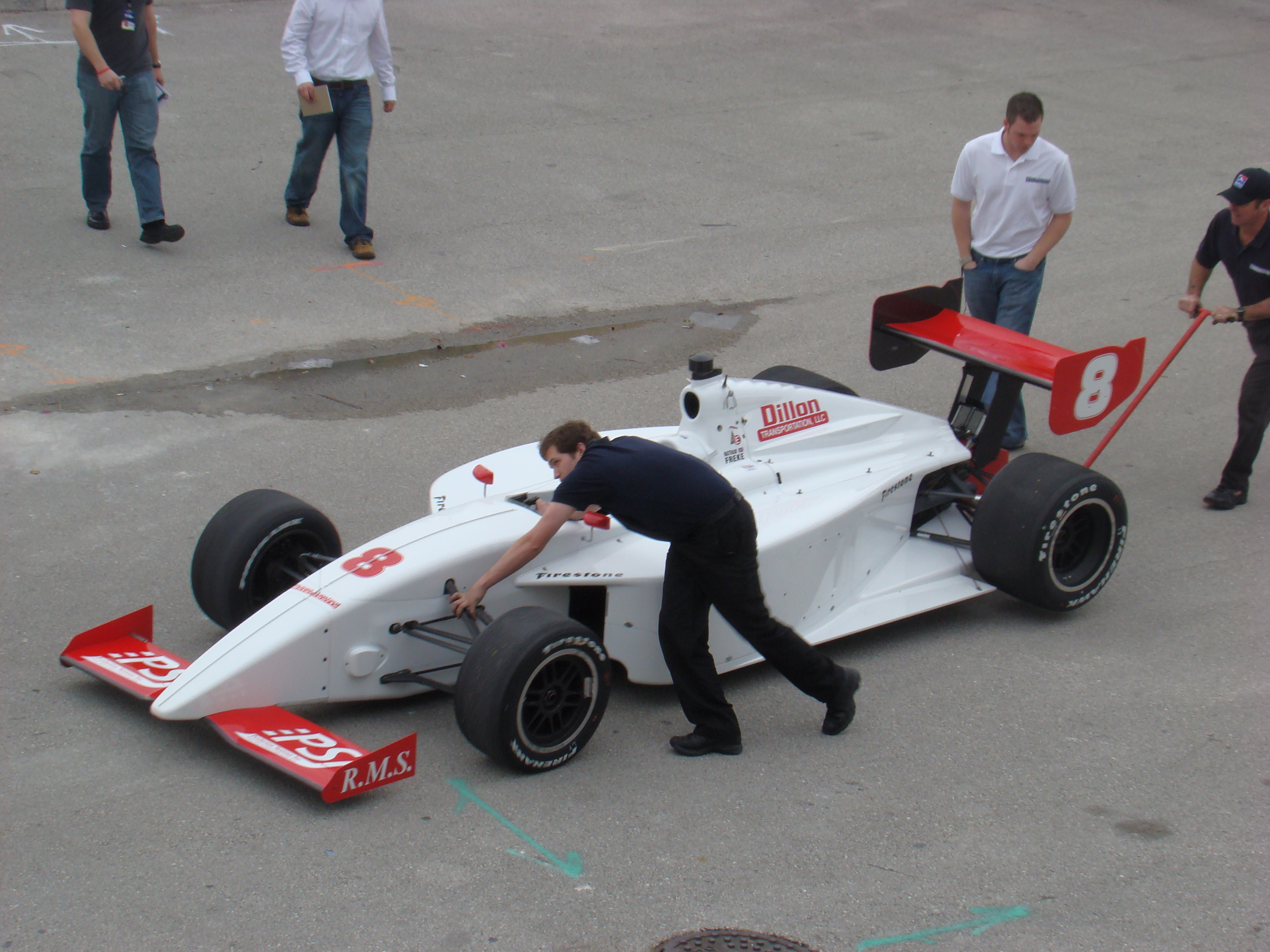
2008 Firestone Indy Lights car during testing at the Homestead-Miami Speedway.

- Engine displacement: Nissan/Infiniti built by Speedway Motors 3.5 L (214 cu in) DOHC V8
- Gearbox: 6-speed sequential manual transmission
- Weight: 1,490 lb (676 kg) on ovals; 1,520 lb (689 kg) on road/street courses
- Power output: 420 hp (313 kW)
- Fuel: Sunoco 100 RON unleaded
- Fuel capacity: 25 US gallons (95 litres)
- Fuel delivery: Fuel injection
- Aspiration: Naturally aspirated
- Length: 191.5 in (4,864 mm)
- Width: 75 in (1,905 mm)
- Wheelbase: 117 in (2,972 mm)
- Steering: Manual, rack and pinion

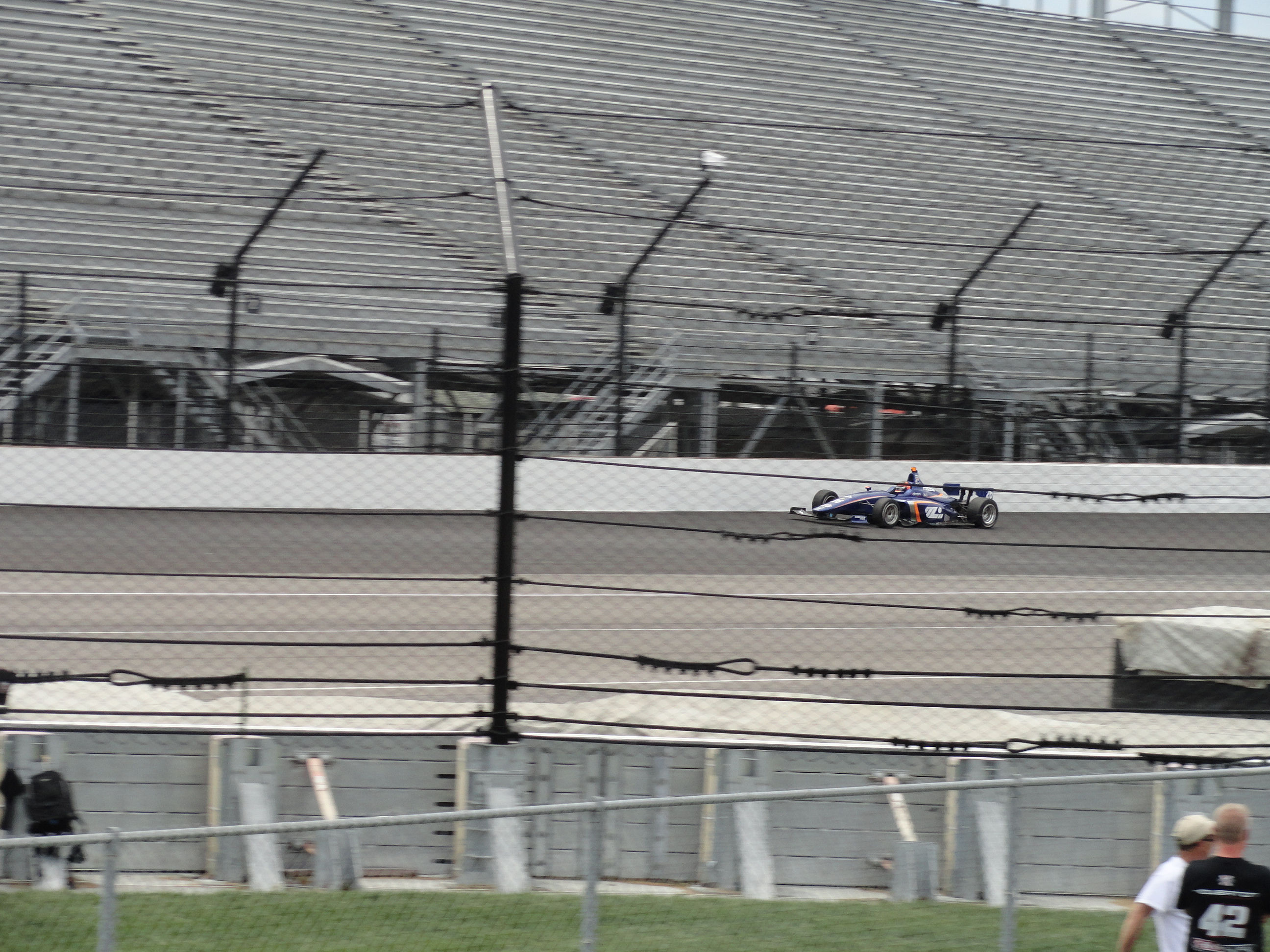
Dallara IL-15, driven by Matheus Leist in the 2017 Freedom 100

=== Specifications (2015–present) ===
- Chassis manufacturer:Dallara IL-15
- Engine displacement: Mazda-AER P63 2.0 L (122 cu in) DOHC inline-4
- Gearbox: 6-speed sequential semi-automatic gearbox
- Weight: 1,400 lb (635 kg) excluding driver and fuel
- Power output: 450 + 50 hp (336 + 37 kW) push-to-pass
- Fuel: VP Racing Fuels 101 RON unleaded
- Fuel delivery: Direct fuel injection
- Aspiration: Single-turbocharged
- Length: 192 in (4,877 mm)
- Width: 76 in (1,930 mm)
- Wheelbase: 117 inches (3,000 mm)
- Steering: Manual, rack and pinion

== Champions ==
=== USAC Mini-Indy Series ===
Season	Driver	Chassis	Engine
1977	(United States) Tom Bagley	Zink Z11	Volkswagen
1977	(United States) Herm Johnson	Lola T324	Volkswagen
1978	(United States) Bill Alsup	Argo JM2	Volkswagen
1979	(Australia) Dennis Firestone	March 79V	Volkswagen
1980	(United States) Peter Kuhn	Ralt RT1/RT5	Volkswagen

- 1977: Bagley and Johnson tied in the points and were declared co-champions.

=== Indy Lights ===
Season	Driver	Team	Chassis	Engine
CART American Racing Series
1986	(Italy) Fabrizio Barbazza	Arciero Racing	March 86A	Buick 3800 V6
1987	(Belgium) Didier Theys	Truesports	March 86A	Buick 3800 V6
1988	(United States) Jon Beekhuis	P.I.G. Enterprises Racing	March 86A	Buick 3800 V6
1989	(United States) Mike Groff	Leading Edge Motorsport	March 86A	Buick 3800 V6
1990	(Canada) Paul Tracy	Landford Racing	March 86A	Buick 3800 V6
CART Firestone/PPG/Dayton Indy Lights Series
1991	(Belgium) Éric Bachelart	Landford Racing	March 86A	Buick 3800 V6
1992	(United States) Robbie Buhl	Leading Edge Motorsport	March 86A	Buick 3800 V6
1993	(United States) Bryan Herta	Tasman Motorsports	Lola T93/20	Buick 3800 V6
1994	(United Kingdom) Steve Robertson	Tasman Motorsports	Lola T93/20	Buick 3800 V6
1995	(Canada) Greg Moore	Forsythe Racing	Lola T93/20	Buick 3800 V6
1996	(Canada) David Empringham	Forsythe Racing	Lola T93/20	Buick 3800 V6
1997	(Brazil) Tony Kanaan	Tasman Motorsports	Lola T97/20	Buick 3800 V6
1998	(Brazil) Cristiano da Matta	Tasman Motorsports	Lola T97/20	Buick 3800 V6
1999	(Spain) Oriol Servià	Dorricott Racing	Lola T97/20	Buick 3800 V6
2000	(New Zealand) Scott Dixon	PacWest Lights	Lola T97/20	Buick 3800 V6
2001	(United States) Townsend Bell	Dorricott Racing	Lola T97/20	Buick 3800 V6
IRL Infiniti Pro Series
2002	(United States) A. J. Foyt IV	A. J. Foyt Enterprises	Dallara IP2	Infiniti VRH35
2003	(United Kingdom) Mark Taylor	Panther Racing	Dallara IP2	Infiniti VRH35
2004	(Brazil) Thiago Medeiros	Sam Schmidt Motorsports	Dallara IP2	Infiniti VRH35
2005	(New Zealand) Wade Cunningham	Brian Stewart Racing	Dallara IP2	Infiniti VRH35
IRL Indy Pro Series
2006	(United Kingdom) Jay Howard	Sam Schmidt Motorsports	Dallara IP2	Nissan VRH35
2007	(United Kingdom) Alex Lloyd	Sam Schmidt Motorsports	Dallara IP2	Nissan VRH35
INDYCAR Indy Lights
2008	(Brazil) Raphael Matos	AGR–AFS Racing	Dallara IP2	Nissan VRH35
2009	(United States) J. R. Hildebrand	AGR–AFS Racing	Dallara IP2	Nissan VRH35
2010	(France) Jean-Karl Vernay	Sam Schmidt Motorsports	Dallara IP2	Nissan VRH35
2011	(United States) Josef Newgarden	Sam Schmidt Motorsports	Dallara IP2	Nissan VRH35
2012	(France) Tristan Vautier	Sam Schmidt Motorsports	Dallara IP2	Nissan VRH35
2013	(United States) Sage Karam	Schmidt Peterson Motorsports	Dallara IP2	Nissan VRH35
2014	(Colombia) Gabby Chaves ^{1}	Belardi Auto Racing	Dallara IP2	Nissan VRH35
2015	(United States) Spencer Pigot	Juncos Racing	Dallara IL-15	Mazda MZR-R
2016	(United Arab Emirates) Ed Jones	Carlin	Dallara IL-15	Mazda MZR-R
2017	(United States) Kyle Kaiser	Juncos Racing	Dallara IL-15	Mazda MZR-R
2018	(Mexico) Patricio O'Ward	Andretti Autosport	Dallara IL-15	Mazda MZR-R
2019	(United States) Oliver Askew	Andretti Autosport	Dallara IL-15	Mazda MZR-R
2020	Season cancelled due to the COVID-19 pandemic			
2021	(United States) Kyle Kirkwood	Andretti Autosport	Dallara IL-15	AER MZR-R
2022	(Sweden) Linus Lundqvist	HMD Motorsports	Dallara IL-15	AER MZR-R
Firestone Indy NXT Series
2023	(Denmark) Christian Rasmussen	HMD Motorsports	Dallara IL-15	AER MZR-R
2024	(United Kingdom) Louis Foster	Andretti Global	Dallara IL-15	AER MZR-R
2025	(Norway) Dennis Hauger	Andretti Global	Dallara IL-15	AER MZR-R
2026	(United States) Nikita Johnson	Cape Motorsports Powered by ECR	Dallara IL-15	AER MZR-R

^{1} Chaves and Jack Harvey (Schmidt Peterson Motorsports were tied in points and wins (4 each). Chaves won the title based on more second-place finishes (5 vs 1).

== Graduates ==
- (United States) Jacob Abel
- (France) Didier André
- (United States) Jeff Andretti
- (United States) Marco Andretti (Note: has won an IndyCar Series event)
- (United States) Richard Antinucci
- (United Kingdom) Ian Ashley
- (United States) Oliver Askew
- (Belgium) Éric Bachelart
- (Italy) Fabrizio Barbazza
- (United Kingdom) Dillon Battistini
- (Brazil) Ana Beatriz
- (United States) Jon Beekhuis
- (United States) Townsend Bell
- (United States) Billy Boat
- (United States) Brian Bonner
- (United States) Geoff Boss
- (Canada) Claude Bourbonnais
- (Australia) Matthew Brabham
- (United States) Steve Bren
- (Australia) Jason Bright
- (United States) Robbie Buhl
- (United States) Buzz Calkins (Note: has won an IndyCar Series championship)
- (Brazil) Jaime Camara
- (Chile) Juan Carlos Carbonell
- (United States) Ed Carpenter
- (Canada) Patrick Carpentier (Note: has won a CART/Champ Car event)
- (Brazil) Hélio Castroneves (Note: has won an Indianapolis 500)
- (Mexico) Alfonso Celis Jr.
- (Colombia) Gabby Chaves
- (United States) Ross Cheever
- (United States) P. J. Chesson
- (United Kingdom) Max Chilton
- (Canada) Zachary Claman DeMelo
- (United States) Bryan Clauson
- (Brazil) Caio Collet
- (New Zealand) Wade Cunningham
- (Italy) Guido Daccò
- (United States) Wally Dallenbach Jr.
- (United States) Conor Daly
- (Brazil) Cristiano da Matta (Note: has won a CART/Champ Car World Series championship)
- (United States) Paul Dana
- (Brazil) Airton Daré
- (Australia) James Davison
- (Mexico) Luis Díaz
- (United States) Mark Dismore
- (New Zealand) Scott Dixon
- (Mexico) Mario Domínguez
- (Sweden) Fredrik Ekblom
- (United States) RC Enerson
- (Belgium) Wim Eyckmans
- (Argentina) Juan Manuel Fangio II
- (Mexico) Adrián Fernández
- (United Kingdom) Louis Foster
- (United States) Stan Fox
- (United States) A. J. Foyt IV
- (France) Franck Fréon
- (Brazil) Luiz Garcia Jr.
- (Brazil) Affonso Giaffone
- (Brazil) Felipe Giaffone
- (United States) Phil Giebler
- (Mexico) Jorge Goeters
- (Brazil) Marco Greco
- (United States) Michael Greenfield
- (United States) Mike Groff
- (United States) Robbie Groff
- (United States) Dean Hall
- (New Zealand) Matt Halliday
- (United States) Scott Harrington
- (United Kingdom) Jack Harvey
- (Japan) Naoki Hattori
- (Japan) Shigeaki Hattori
- (Norway) Dennis Hauger
- (United Kingdom) Jack Hawksworth
- (United States) Jon Herb
- (United States) Bryan Herta
- (United States) Colton Herta
- (United States) J. R. Hildebrand
- (Canada) James Hinchcliffe
- (United Kingdom) Jay Howard
- (United States) Ken Johnson
- (United States) Davy Jones
- (United Arab Emirates) Ed Jones
- (United States) P. J. Jones
- (Sweden) Niclas Jönsson
- (United States) Kyle Kaiser
- (Brazil) Tony Kanaan
- (United States) Sage Karam
- (Canada) Dalton Kellett
- (United States) Charlie Kimball
- (United States) Kyle Kirkwood
- (United States) David Kudrave
- (Mexico) Rodolfo Lavín
- (United States) Eddie Lawson
- (United States) Jaques Lazier
- (Brazil) Matheus Leist
- (United Kingdom) Alex Lloyd
- (Sweden) Linus Lundqvist
- (Netherlands) Arie Luyendyk Jr.
- (United States) David Malukas
- (United Kingdom) Pippa Mann
- (Brazil) Raphael Matos
- (Japan) Hiro Matsushita
- (New Zealand) Hunter McElrea
- (United States) Casey Mears
- (Brazil) Thiago Medeiros
- (United States) Chris Menninga
- (United States) Dr. Jack Miller
- (Canada) Greg Moore
- (Colombia) Carlos Muñoz
- (United States) Brad Murphey
- (Japan) Hideki Mutoh
- (United States) Josef Newgarden
- (Japan) Hideki Noda
- (United States) Ryan Norman
- (United States) Johnny O'Connell
- (Mexico) Patricio O'Ward
- (Denmark) Benjamin Pedersen
- (France) Franck Perera
- (United States) Spencer Pigot
- (United Kingdom) Martin Plowman
- (United States) Ted Prappas
- (United States) Graham Rahal
- (Denmark) Christian Rasmussen
- (United States) Greg Ray
- (United States) Tony Renna
- (Brazil) André Ribeiro
- (United States) Sting Ray Robb
- (United States) Billy Roe
- (Brazil) Mario Romancini
- (Sweden) Felix Rosenqvist
- (Canada) Marty Roth
- (Colombia) Sebastián Saavedra
- (Brazil) Gualter Salles
- (Italy) Vinicio Salmi
- (Italy) Franco Scapini
- (Spain) Oriol Servià
- (United States) Nolan Siegel
- (United States) Jeff Simmons
- (Cayman Islands) Kyffin Simpson
- (United Kingdom) Guy Smith
- (United States) Mark Smith
- (United Kingdom) Toby Sowery
- (United States) Sammy Swindell
- (United Kingdom) Mark Taylor
- (Belgium) Didier Theys
- (United States) Brian Till
- (Canada) Paul Tracy
- (United States) Robby Unser
- (United States) Jimmy Vasser
- (France) Tristan Vautier
- (United States) Zach Veach
- (Netherlands) Rinus Veekay
- (United States) Jeff Ward
- (United Kingdom) Dan Wheldon
- (United Kingdom) Stefan Wilson
- (United States) Cory Witherill

== See also ==
- IndyCar
- Freedom 100
