= Jeremy Dale (racing driver) =

Canadian racing driver

Personal details
- Born: November 23, 1962 (age 63) Toronto, Ontario, Canada

Jeremy Dale (born 23 November 1962) is a Canadian racing driver. His career in motorsports has spanned more than 30 years as a racer, television commentator, race series director, race team president, and race team owner.

== Racing career (1978-1995) ==
Dale began his driving career at the age of 16 in the Canadian amateur and vintage car ranks. His first racecar was a 1955 Cooper Formula 3 powered by a Triumph motorcycle engine. He later owned, prepared and raced a 1969 Lotus 69 Formula Ford.

In 1983, to further his skills and increase his racing acumen, Dale focused on learning the minutiae of racecars by attending the Skip Barber Racing School, the Jim Russell Racing School and the Winfield Racing School (France), finishing at the top of his class at every school. In France, he became the prestigious recipient of Volant Elf Scholarship for his performance at Winfield. During the 1984 & 1985 racing seasons, Dale raced in the Skip Barber Northeast Division, winning multiple races and the Rookie-of-the-Year title in 1984 before transitioning to the Barber-Saab Pro Series, winning seven of 27 races over a three-year period.

During the mid-Eighties, Dale began working for the Skip Barber organization as a driving instructor and test driver. Ultimately, Dale would end up working with Skip Barber Racing, on and off in multiple roles, for 17 years. The Barber-Saab Series provided a springboard into a professional motorsports driving career with a number of factory-backed sports car drives. Dale was a factory driver for Dodge in the IMSA Firehawk Series in 1988–89. He accrued multiple wins behind the wheel of a Dodge Daytona and Eagle Talon, culminating in a Firehawk Series Championship in 1989. During the 1989 season Dale performed double duty with Dodge as he was drafted into their IMSA GTU program midway through the season, beginning with Round five at Mosport. Dale won his debut outing and eventually posting three more wins before the year was over. He narrowly missed winning the 1989 GTU championship, despite missing the first four races of the season. Dale's performances behind the wheel of the Dodge Daytona GTU car led to an offer from the factory Nissan IMSA GTO team to participate in a ‘gong show’ driver test for a seat in the 300ZX for the 1990 season. Dale competed against Johnny O'Connell, Mike Groff and Dennis Aase, winning the seat handily. Dale raced the 300ZX from 1990 through 1992, scoring multiple wins. In 1991, Dale and his teammate were drafted into Nissan's GTP program for the 1991 Daytona 24-hour, sharing a Nissan Group C car with Arie Luyendyk and Julian Bailey. The car was leading during the 20th hour when it suffered a right rear tire blowout at 215 mph, forcing its retirement from the race.

In 1994, Dale was the lead driver for the Brix Racing / Oldsmobile IMSA World Sports Car (WSC) team, winning his class at the Daytona 24-Hour as well as overall wins in Portland and Phoenix. Dale missed winning the WSC championship in 1994 by a mere two points. 1995 started with another class win at the Daytona 24-Hour and a solid run at the Sebring 12-Hour race. However, at the following round in Road Atlanta, Dale suffered a career-ending injury when his car slammed head-on into the side of the spinning and near-stationary Ferrari 333SP WSC car of Fabrizio Barbazza at the last corner of the Road Atlanta course after Barbazza's Ferrari was collected in a related major accident between two slower GT cars. Dale used a wheelchair for one year and crutches for another year. After multiple surgeries and countless hours of physical therapy, Dale returned to racing ready to pursue new opportunities outside of the car.

== Television work (1996-2002) ==
While recovering from his crash under the care of Dr. Terry Trammel in Indianapolis, IN, the renowned television motorsports production company, Lingner Group Productions, contacted Dale inquiring about his interest in trying his hand at color commentary for broadcast. Dale started slowly and moved quickly into full-time television, providing expert TV analysis for ESPN, ESPN2, FOX, FOX SportsNet, SpeedVision and Speed Channel. Working with co-hosts such as Bob Varsha, David Hobbs, Derek Daly and Marty Reid, he provided insight for hundreds of racing programs, including Sports Car Endurance racing, the NASCAR Craftsman Truck Series and Formula One.

== Motorsports management (2000-present) ==
Through his work as a driving coach and test driver for the Barber-Dodge Pro Series, Dale was familiar with the BDPS organization and assumed the Managing Director role in 2000. During his tenure at Barber-Dodge, the series helped form the skills of drivers A. J. Allmendinger, Danica Patrick, Alex Gurney, Ryan Hunter-Reay and many more. He continued with Barber-Dodge until late 2002, when his old friend, Carl Russo, recruited Dale to be the President of his new race team, RuSPORT.

RuSPORT competed in the 2003 CART/Toyota Atlantic Championship and in the 2004-2007 Champ Car World Series. In 2003, with drivers Aaron Justus and A. J. Allmendinger, the team won the Atlantic championship title, setting multiple records along the way. In 2004, the team made the transition to the Champ Car World Series, initially fielding a one-car team featuring A. J. Allmendinger. Four weeks prior to the start of the 2004 season, Russo added a second car, driven by Champ Car veteran, Michel Jourdain Jr. The team scored a number of podium finishes and took home Rookie-of –the-Year honors for A. J. Allmendinger. In 2004, RuSPORT became only the second team ever in the history of Champ Car World Series to win their driver the Rookie-of-the-Year title as a rookie team. The team won its first Champ Car race in Dale's hometown of Toronto in 2005 with Justin Wilson piloting the #9/CDW/ Lola/Cosworth. More wins would follow that year, including a dominant 1-2 finish at the final round in Mexico City. Wilson finished second in Champ Car driver points in 2006 and 2007, scoring more wins for the team.

Dale broke out on his own in 2007 and founded JDX Racing LLC, later licensing the entity to his former IMSA team owner, the late Harry Brix. Dale was forced to take time off through 2011 and 2012 due to the discovery of an aortic aneurysm, leading to open heart surgery in 2011. His recovery has been slow and steady, though the expectation is a full recovery with no long term side effects or consequences.

== Personal life ==
Dale currently resides both in his hometown of Toronto and in northern Colorado with his wife, Joanne.

== Career overview ==
- 2007–present: Founder, JDX Racing LLC
- 2003-2007: President, RuSPORT
- 2000-2002: Managing director, Barber-Dodge Pro Series
- 1996-2002: TV commentator (SPEED TV / Fox Sports / ESPN)
- 1996-1999: Driver coach and test driver, Barber-Dodge Pro Series
- 1994-1995; Lead driver for Brix Racing factory Oldsmobile World Sports Car Team; two-time class winner, Rolex/Daytona 24-Hour; overall wins at Portland and Phoenix.
- 1990-1992; Nissan factory driver for 300ZX IMSA sports car team. Multiple race wins including Watkins Glen, Mid-Ohio and Mosport.
- 1989; Factory driver for Dodge Motorsports IMSA GTU program. Multiple wins including Mosport, Sears Point and Del Mar.
- 1988-1989; Dodge Daytona factory driver in IMSA Firehawk Series. Multiple wins including series champion in 1989.
- 1986-1988; Barber-Saab Pro Series. Won 7 of 27 races.
- 1984-1985; Skip Barber Race Series (North East Division). Multiple wins and rookie of the year in 1984.
- 1983; Jim Russell Racing School (Quebec, Canada); Elf-Winfield Racing School (Magny-Cours, France); Skip Barber Racing School (Poconos, PA, USA).
- 1978-1982; Multiple race winner in both modern and vintage racing cars.

== External Images ==
- 1988 - Columbus Street Circuit - Firestone Firehawk - Dodge Daytona
- 1989 - Road Atlanta - Firestone Firehawk - Dodge Daytona
- 1989 - Road America - Firestone Firehawk - Eagle Talon
- 1989 - Road America - IMSA GTU - Dodge Daytona
- 1990 - Topeka - IMSA GTO - Nissan 300ZX Turbo
- 1990 - Topeka - IMSA GTO - Nissan 300ZX Turbo
- 1990 - Topeka - IMSA GTO - Nissan 300ZX Turbo
- 1990 - Topeka - IMSA GTO - Nissan 300ZX Turbo
- 1990 - Topeka - IMSA GTO - Nissan 300ZX Turbo
- 1990 - Mid-Ohio - IMSA GTO - Nissan 300ZX Turbo
- 1991 - Mid-Ohio - IMSA GTO - Nissan 300ZX Turbo
- 1991 - Road America - IMSA GTO - Nissan 300ZX Turbo
- 1992 - Mid-Ohio - IMSA GTS - Nissan 300ZX Turbo
- 1992 - Road America - IMSA GTS - Nissan 300ZX Turbo
- 2003 - Toronto - RuSPORT Atlantic Car (Aaron Justus)
- 2004 - Road America - RuSPORT Champ Car (Michel Jourdain Jr.)
- 2005 - Edmonton - RuSPORT Champ Car (AJ Allmendinger)
- 2006 - Edmonton - RuSPORT Champ Car (Justin Wilson)
