= 1993 Indy Lights season =

The 1993 PPG/Firestone Indy Lights Championship consisted of 12 races and featured the introduction of new Lola chassis. However, this season was also unique in that included a separate "B-Class" classification for drivers using the previous season's March chassis. However, the B class was not a success, never with more than four entries and many oval races only saw a single entry from B-class "champion" Jack Miller, the only driver to compete in all twelve B-Class races.

In this 1993 season, the March 86A Wildcat-Buick used since the inception of the series in 1986, was replaced by the Lola T93/20-Buick specification.

Bryan Herta put on a strong showing in the main championship, winning 7 races and defeating his closest rival by 91 points.

== Calendar ==
Race No	Track	State	Date	Laps	Distance	Time	Speed	Winner	Pole position	Most leading laps	Fastest race lap
1	Phoenix	Arizona	April 4, 1993	75	1.6093=120.6975 km	0'47:25.672	152.692 km/h	Sandy Brody	Bryan Herta	Bryan Herta	?
2	Long Beach	California	April 18, 1993	47	2.558787=120.262989 km	0'52:20.256	137.870 km/h	Steve Robertson	Franck Fréon	Franck Fréon	?
3	Milwaukee	Wisconsin	June 6, 1993	75	1.6607976=124.55982 km	0'41:30.006	180.086 km/h	Bryan Herta	Steve Robertson	Robbie Groff	?
4	Detroit	Michigan	June 13, 1993	33	3.37953=111.52449 km	0'48:55.203	136.784 km/h	Steve Robertson	Bryan Herta	Steve Robertson	?
5	Portland	Oregon	June 27, 1993	39	3.138135=122.387265 km	0'57:42.027	127.265 km/h	Franck Fréon	Bryan Herta	Bryan Herta	?
6	Cleveland	Ohio	July 11, 1993	32	3.8124317=121.9978144 km	0'42:00.589	174.242 km/h	Bryan Herta	Bryan Herta	Bryan Herta	?
7	Toronto	Canada	July 18, 1993	42	2.8709912=120.58163 km	0'45:33.556	158.802 km/h	Bryan Herta	Steve Robertson	Bryan Herta	?
8	Loudon	New Hampshire	August 8, 1993	66	1.7026394=112.3742004 km	0'37:41.723	178.867 km/h	Steve Robertson	Bryan Herta	Steve Robertson	?
9	Vancouver	Canada	August 29, 1993	46	2.6601729=122.3679534 km	0'50:05.044	146.595 km/h	Bryan Herta	Steve Robertson	Bryan Herta	?
10	Lexington	Ohio	September 12, 1993	34	3.6337994=122.004252 km	0'51:17.035	142.740 km/h	Bryan Herta	Bryan Herta	Bryan Herta	?
11	Nazareth	Pennsylvania	September 19, 1993	55	1.5223978=83.731879 km	0'34:23.908	146.050 km/h	Bryan Herta	Bryan Herta	Bryan Herta	?
12	Monterey	California	October 3, 1993	31	3.5629902=110.4526902 km	0'49:38.862	133.484 km/h	Bryan Herta	Bryan Herta	Bryan Herta	?

== Race summaries ==
=== Phoenix race ===
Held April 4 at Phoenix International Raceway. Bryan Herta won the pole.

Top Five Results

1. Sandy Brody
2. Bryan Herta
3. Robbie Groff
4. Jeff Ward
5. Greg Moore

B-Class Winner: Jack Miller (only entrant)

=== Long Beach race ===
Held April 18 at Long Beach, California Street Course. Franck Fréon won the pole.

Top Five Results

1. Steve Robertson
2. Franck Fréon
3. Bryan Herta
4. Pedro Chaves
5. Robbie Groff

B-Class Winner: Fredrik Ekblom

=== Milwaukee race ===
Held June 6 at The Milwaukee Mile. Steve Robertson won the pole.

Top Five Results

1. Bryan Herta
2. Nick Firestone
3. Robert Amrén
4. Buzz Calkins
5. Greg Moore

B-Class Winner: Mike Palumbo

=== Detroit race ===
Held June 13 at Belle Isle Raceway. Bryan Herta won the pole.

Top Five Results

1. Steve Robertson
2. Bryan Herta
3. Robbie Groff
4. Franck Fréon
5. James Weaver

B-Class Winner: Bob Reid

=== Portland race ===
Held June 27 at Portland International Raceway. Bryan Herta won the pole.

Top Five Results

1. Franck Fréon
2. Fredrik Ekblom
3. Greg Moore
4. Bryan Herta
5. Bob Dorricott Jr.

B-Class Winner: Jack Miller (only entrant)

=== Cleveland race ===
Held July 11 at Burke Lakefront Airport. Bryan Herta won the pole.

Top Five Results

1. Bryan Herta
2. Steve Robertson
3. Franck Fréon
4. Robbie Groff
5. Pedro Chaves

B-Class Winner: Bob Reid

=== Toronto race ===
Held July 18 at Exhibition Place. Steve Robertson won the pole.

Top Five Results

1. Bryan Herta
2. Franck Fréon
3. Pedro Chaves
4. Fredrik Ekblom
5. Robbie Groff

B-Class Winner: Bob Reid

=== Loudon race ===
Held August 8 at New Hampshire International Speedway. Bryan Herta won the pole.

Top Five Results

1. Steve Robertson
2. Robbie Groff
3. Harald Huysman
4. Buzz Calkins
5. Fredrik Ekblom

B-Class Winner: Jack Miller (only entrant)

=== Vancouver race ===
Held August 29 at Pacific Place. Steve Robertson won the pole.

Top Five Results

1. Bryan Herta
2. Pedro Chaves
3. Eddie Lawson
4. Nick Firestone
5. Franck Fréon

B-Class Winner: Jack Miller

=== Mid-Ohio race ===
Held September 12 at The Mid-Ohio Sports Car Course. Bryan Herta won the pole.

Top Five Results

1. Bryan Herta
2. Steve Robertson
3. Pedro Chaves
4. Greg Moore
5. Nick Firestone

B-Class Winner: Jack Miller (only entrant)

=== Nazareth race ===
Held September 19 at Nazareth Speedway. Bryan Herta won the pole.

Top Five Results

1. Bryan Herta
2. Nick Firestone
3. Franck Fréon
4. Robbie Groff
5. Fredrik Ekblom

B-Class Winner: Jack Miller (only entrant)

=== Laguna Seca race ===
Held October 3 at Mazda Raceway Laguna Seca. Bryan Herta won the pole.

Top Five Results

1. Bryan Herta
2. Eddie Lawson
3. Robbie Groff
4. Pedro Chaves
5. Fredrik Ekblom

B-Class Winner: David Pook

== Final points standings ==
=== Driver ===
==== Main championship ====
For every race the points were awarded: 20 points to the winner, 16 for runner-up, 14 for third place, 12 for fourth place, 10 for fifth place, 8 for sixth place, 6 seventh place, winding down to 1 point for 12th place. Additional points were awarded to the pole winner (1 point) and to the driver leading the most laps (1 point).

Place	Name	Country	Team	Chassis	Total points	(United States)	(United States)	(United States)	(United States)	(United States)	(United States)	(Canada)	(United States)	(Canada)	(United States)	(United States)	(United States)
1	Bryan Herta	United States	Tasman Motorsports	Lola	213	18	14	20	17	14	22	21	1	21	22	21	22
2	Franck Fréon	France	John Martin Racing	Lola	122	4	18	-	12	20	14	16	6	10	8	14	-
3	Steve Robertson	United Kingdom	Tasman Motorsports	Lola	107	5	20	1	21	-	16	1	21	1	16	-	5
4	Pedro Chaves	Portugal	Brian Stewart Racing	Lola	105	8	12	3	-	6	10	14	4	16	14	6	12
5	Robbie Groff	United States	Bradley Motorsports	Lola	103	14	10	1	14	-	12	10	16
5	Robbie Groff	United States	Groff Motorsports	Lola	103									-	-	12	14
6	Nick Firestone	United States	Dick Simon Racing	Lola	85	-	-	16	-	8	2	8	5	12	10	16	8
7	Fredrik Ekblom	Sweden	ZW Motorsports	March	78	-	6
7	Fredrik Ekblom	Sweden	ZW Motorsports	Lola	78			5	-	16	-	12	10	4	5	10	10
8	Harald Huysman	Norway	Tasman Motorsports	Lola	68	6	5	8	8	-	6	6	14	6	6	3	-
9	Greg Moore	Canada	Greg Moore Racing	Lola	64	10	-	10	5	14	3	5	-	-	12	5	-
10	Sandy Brody	United States	?	Lola	44	20	-	4	-	-	-	-	8	5	-	1	6
	Buzz Calkins	United States	Bradley Motorsports	Lola	44	-	2	12	3	2	-	-	12	2	-	8	3
12	Eddie Lawson	United States	Leading Edge Motorsport	Lola	42	-	-	-	-	5	4	-	3	14	-	-	16
13	Robert Amrén	Sweden	Team Enza	Lola	34	3	8	14	-	-	8	1	-	-	-	-	-
14	Hubert Haupt	Germany	A. L. Motorsports	Lola	31	-	-	1	6	3	5	4	-	8	4	-	-
15	César T. Jiménez	Mexico	?	Lola	19	1	4	6	-	-	1	-	2	-	3	2	-
	Bob Dorricott Jr.	United States	Dorricott Racing	Lola	19	-	3	-	4	10	-	-	-	1	-	-	1
17	Jeff Ward	United States	Leading Edge Motorsport	Lola	16	12	-	2	2	-	-	-	-	-	-	-	-
18	Scott Schubot	United States	TransAtlantic Racing	Lola	16	2	-	-	1	4	-	3	1	3	2	-	-
19	James Weaver	United Kingdom	?	Lola	14	-	-	-	10	-	-	-	-	-	-	4	-
20	Mark Dismore	United States	?	Lola	4	-	-	-	-	-	-	-	-	-	-	-	4
21	Bob Reid	United States	?	March	2	-	-	-	-	-	-	2	-	-	-	-	-
	Jack Miller	United States	Miller Racing	March	2	-	-	-	-	1	-	-	-	-	1	-	-
	Yukio Okamoto	Japan	?	Lola	2	-	-	-	-	-	-	-	-	-	-	-	2
24	Ray Richter	United States	RaysCar Racing	Lola	1	-	1	-	-	-	-	-	-	-	-	-	-

Note:

Race 13 – no additional point for the pole-position was awarded due to rain, starting grid were determined by championship points standing.

==== B-Class championship ====
Place	Name	Country	Team	Chassis	Total points	(United States)	(United States)	(United States)	(United States)	(United States)	(United States)	(Canada)	(United States)	(Canada)	(United States)	(United States)	(United States)
1	Jack Miller	United States	Miller Racing	March	204	20	14	16	14	20	12	16	20	20	20	20	12
2	Bob Reid	United States	?	March	60	-	-	-	20	-	20	20	-	-	-	-	-
3	Mike Palumbo	United States	John Martin Racing	March	44	-	12	20	12	-	-	-	-	-	-	-	-
	Richard Nauert	United States	Southwestern Performance	March	44	-	16	-	-	-	14	-	-	-	-	-	14
5	Fausto Galdi	Brazil	Elff Racing	March	32	-	-	-	16	-	16	-	-	-	-	-	-
6	Fredrik Ekblom	Sweden	ZW Motorsports	March	20	-	20	-	-	-	-	-	-	-	-	-	-
	David Pook	United States	John Martin Racing	March	20	-	-	-	-	-	-	-	-	-	-	-	20
8	Tom Finnelly Jr.	United States	John Martin Racing	March	16	-	-	-	-	-	-	-	-	16	-	-	-
	Scott Wood	United States	?	March	16	-	-	-	-	-	-	-	-	-	-	-	16

Note:

Unclear if there were also additional points awarded.

== Complete Overview ==
first column of every race	10	= grid position

second column of every race	10	= race result

R13=retired, but classified NS=did not start (9)=place after practice, but grid position not held free

Place	Name	Country	Team	Chassis	(United States)		(United States)		(United States)		(United States)		(United States)		(United States)		(Canada)		(United States)		(United States)		(Canada)		(United States)		(United States)
1	Bryan Herta	United States	Tasman Motorsports	Lola	1	2	3	3	3	1	1	2	1	4	1	1	2	1	1	R13	2	1	1	1	1	1	1	1
2	Franck Fréon	France	John Martin Racing	Lola	10	9	1	2	19	R18	4	4	4	1	4	3	3	2	4	7	11	5	9	6	2	3	3	R17
3	Steve Robertson	United Kingdom	Tasman Motorsports	Lola	6	8	2	1	1	R16	2	1	6	R15	7	2	1	R13	2	1	1	R15	2	2	3	R14	2	8
4	Pedro Chaves	Portugal	Brian Stewart Racing	Lola	9	6	4	4	7	10	9	R17	3	7	2	5	5	3	12	9	6	2	3	3	4	7	5	4
5	Robbie Groff	United States	Bradley Motorsports	Lola	11	3	5	5	4	R15	3	3	2	R14	6	4	4	R5	7	2
5	Robbie Groff	United States	Groff Motorsports	Lola																	5	R16	5	R19	5	4	6	3
6	Nick Firestone	United States	Dick Simon Racing	Lola	8	R13	11	R20	5	2	11	R13	15	6	12	11	9	6	10	8	4	4	4	5	7	2	9	6
7	Fredrik Ekblom	Sweden	ZW Motorsports	March	-	-	8	7
7	Fredrik Ekblom	Sweden	ZW Motorsports	Lola					11	8	6	R16	7	2	3	R20	6	4	6	5	9	9	7	8	9	5	4	5
8	Harald Huysman	Norway	Tasman Motorsports	Lola	3	7	9	8	18	6	7	6	8	R18	13	7	8	7	11	3	13	7	16	7	6	10	16	14
9	Greg Moore	Canada	Greg Moore Racing	Lola	7	5	13	17	2	5	14	8	5	3	15	10	14	8	5	R16	8	R18	8	4	8	8	10	R19
10	Sandy Brody	United States	?	Lola	4	1	14	R15	6	9	19	R19	12	R16	5	R22	(9)	NS	3	6	7	8	10	R14	10	12	12	7
	Buzz Calkins	United States	Bradley Motorsports	Lola	-	-	16	11	8	4	13	10	10	11	16	13	12	R17	8	4	14	11	15	13	11	6	17	10
12	Eddie Lawson	United States	Leading Edge Motorsport	Lola	-	-	-	-	-	-	-	-	13	8	8	9	-	-	9	10	3	3	14	R17	-	-	7	2
13	Robert Amrén	Sweden	Team Enza	Lola	12	10	7	6	9	3	8	15	-	-	11	6	7	R12	-	-	12	R19	-	-	-	-	-	-
14	Hubert Haupt	Germany	A. L. Motorsports	Lola	-	-	15	R19	15	12	10	7	11	10	10	8	11	9	-	-	15	6	11	9	-	-
14	Hubert Haupt	Germany	RaysCar Racing	Lola																							13	R22
15	César Jiménez	Mexico	?	Lola	5	R12	10	9	10	7	-	-	-	-	9	12	13	R18	14	11	10	R17	12	10	12	11	15	R21
	Bob Dorricott Jr.	United States	Dorricott Racing	Lola	13	NS	18	10	14	R17	15	9	9	5	-	-	-	-	-	-	17	12	-	-	-	-	18	12
17	Jeff Ward	United States	Leading Edge Motorsport	Lola	2	4	12	16	12	11	12	R11	14	R17	-	-	-	-	-	-	-	-	-	-	-	-	-	-
18	Scott Schubot	United States	TransAtlantic Racing	Lola	14	11	20	13	16	13	20	R12	17	9	18	15	15	10	15	12	16	10	18	11	13	13	-	-
19	James Weaver	United Kingdom	?	Lola	-	-	6	R21	-	-	5	5	-	-	14	R21	10	R14	-	-	-	-	6	R16	14	9	-	-
20	Mark Dismore	United States	?	Lola	-	-	-	-	-	-	-	-	-	-	-	-	-	-	-	-	-	-	13	R18	-	-	11	9
21	Bob Reid	United States	?	March	-	-	-	-	16	R14	-	-	20	14	17	11	-	-	-	-	-	-	-	-	-	-	-	-
	Jack Miller	United States	Miller Racing	March	15	R14	21	R18	17	R19	21	R20	18	12	22	R19	18	R17	16	14	19	R13	19	12	15	R15	21	R18
	Yukio Okamoto	Japan	?	Lola	-	-	-	-	-	-	-	-	-	-	-	-	-	-	-	-	-	-	-	-	-	-	19	11
24	Ray Richter	United States	RaysCar Racing	Lola	-	-	19	12	-	-	-	-	16	R13	-	-	-	-	-	-	-	-	-	-	-	-	-	-
-	David Pook	United States	?	Lola	-	-	-	-	-	-	-	-	-	-	-	-	-	-	13	R15	-	-	-	-	-	-
-	David Pook	United States	John Martin Racing	March																							20	13
-	Richard Nauert	United States	Southwestern Performance	March	-	-	22	14	-	-	-	-	-	-	23	18	-	-	-	-	-	-	-	-	-	-	22	16
-	Mike Palumbo	United States	John Martin Racing	March	-	-	17	R22	13	14	17	R21	-	-	-	-	-	-	-	-	-	-	-	-	-	-	-	-
-	Tom Finnelly Jr.	United States	John Martin Racing	March	-	-	-	-	-	-	-	-	-	-	-	-	-	-	-	-	18	R14	-	-	-	-	-	-
-	Mark Ritchey	United States	?	Lola	-	-	-	-	-	-	-	-	-	-	21	16	16	R15	-	-	-	-	-	-	-	-	19	11
-	Tony Ave	United States	?	Lola	-	-	-	-	-	-	-	-	-	-	17	R23	-	-	-	-	-	-	17	R15	-	-	14	R23
-	Scott Wood	United States	?	March	-	-	-	-	-	-	-	-	-	-	-	-	-	-	-	-	-	-	-	-	-	-	23	15
-	Fausto Galdi	Brazil	Elff Racing	March	-	-	-	-	-	-	18	R18	-	-	19	17	-	-	-	-	-	-	-	-	-	-	-	-
-	Russell Spence	United Kingdom	Bradley Motorsports	Lola	-	-	-	-	-	-	-	-	-	-	-	-	-	-	-	-	-	-	-	-	-	-	8	R20
