= 1994 Indy Lights season =

The 1994 PPG/Firestone Indy Lights Championship consisted of 12 races. Englishman Steve Robertson edged out André Ribeiro for the championship by 9 points. Both drivers captured four victories.

All drivers used the Lola T93/20-Buick specification.

== Calendar ==
Race No	Track	State	Date	Laps	Distance	Time	Speed	Winner	Pole position	Most leading laps	Fastest race lap
1	Phoenix	Arizona	April 10, 1994	75	1.6093=120.6975 km	0'30:45.929	235.389 km/h	Greg Moore	Greg Moore	Greg Moore	?
2	Long Beach	California	April 17, 1994	47	2.558787=120.262989 km	0'58:37.529	123.083 km/h	Steve Robertson	Eddie Lawson	Steve Robertson	?
3	Milwaukee	Wisconsin	June 5, 1994	75	1.6607976=124.55982 km	0'45:59.752	162.484 km/h	Steve Robertson	André Ribeiro	Steve Robertson	?
4	Detroit	Michigan	June 12, 1994	36	3.37953=121.66308 km	0'54:14.920	134.562 km/h	Steve Robertson	Steve Robertson	Steve Robertson	?
5	Portland	Oregon	June 26, 1994	39	3.138135=122.387265 km	0'49:39.853	147.858 km/h	André Ribeiro	André Ribeiro	André Ribeiro	?
6	Cleveland	Ohio	July 10, 1994	32	3.8124317=121.9978144 km	0'36:14.162	202.005 km/h	Eddie Lawson	Pedro Chaves	Pedro Chaves	?
7	Toronto	Canada	July 17, 1994	42	2.8709912=120.58163 km	0'48:30.269	149.159 km/h	Steve Robertson	Greg Moore	Greg Moore	?
8	Lexington	Ohio	August 14, 1994	33.5	3.6337994=122.004252 km	0'43:08.543	169.677 km/h	André Ribeiro	André Ribeiro	André Ribeiro	?
9	Loudon	New Hampshire	August 21, 1994	71	1.7026394=120.887397 km	0'37:04.349	195.650 km/h	Greg Moore	Steve Robertson	Steve Robertson	?
10	Vancouver	Canada	September 4, 1994	37	2.6601729=98.4263973 km	0'39:51.696	148.152 km/h	André Ribeiro	Alex Padilla	André Ribeiro	?
11	Nazareth	Pennsylvania	September 18, 1994	75	1.5223978=114.179835 km	0'40:47.866	167.921 km/h	Greg Moore	Bob Dorricott Jr.	Greg Moore	?
12	Monterey	California	October 9, 1994	34	3.5629902=121.141667 km	0'51:39.520	140.702 km/h	André Ribeiro	André Ribeiro	André Ribeiro	?

== Race summaries ==
=== Phoenix race ===
Held April 10 at Phoenix International Raceway. Greg Moore won the pole.

Top Five Results

1. Greg Moore
2. Steve Robertson
3. Eddie Lawson
4. André Ribeiro
5. Markus Liesner

=== Long Beach race ===
Held April 17 at Long Beach, California Street Course. Eddie Lawson won the pole.

Top Five Results

1. Steve Robertson
2. Greg Moore
3. Pedro Chaves
4. Nick Firestone
5. David DeSilva

=== Milwaukee race ===
Held June 5 at The Milwaukee Mile. André Ribeiro won the pole.

Top Five Results

1. Steve Robertson
2. Eddie Lawson
3. Greg Moore
4. David Pook
5. Rob Wilson

=== Detroit race ===
Held June 12 at Belle Isle Raceway. Steve Robertson won the pole.

Top Five Results

1. Steve Robertson
2. Eddie Lawson
3. Pedro Chaves
4. André Ribeiro
5. Nick Firestone

=== Portland race ===
Held June 26 at Portland International Raceway. André Ribeiro won the pole.

Top Five Results

1. André Ribeiro
2. Pedro Chaves
3. Eddie Lawson
4. Steve Robertson
5. Greg Moore

=== Cleveland race ===
Held July 10 at Burke Lakefront Airport. Pedro Chaves won the pole.

Top Five Results

1. Eddie Lawson
2. Greg Moore
3. Pedro Chaves
4. Nick Firestone
5. André Ribeiro

=== Toronto race ===
Held July 17 at Exhibition Place. Greg Moore won the pole.

Top Five Results

1. Steve Robertson
2. André Ribeiro
3. Nick Firestone
4. Alex Padilla
5. Eddie Lawson

=== Mid-Ohio race ===
Held August 14 at The Mid-Ohio Sports Car Course. André Ribeiro won the pole.

Top Five Results

1. André Ribeiro
2. Eddie Lawson
3. Pedro Chaves
4. Steve Robertson
5. Nick Firestone

=== Loudon race ===
Held August 21 at New Hampshire International Speedway. Steve Robertson won the pole.

Top Five Results

1. Greg Moore
2. André Ribeiro
3. Steve Robertson
4. Alex Padilla
5. Pedro Chaves

=== Vancouver race ===
Held September 4 at Pacific Place. Alex Padilla won the pole.

Top Five Results

1. André Ribeiro
2. Steve Robertson
3. Alex Padilla
4. Pedro Chaves
5. Greg Moore

=== Nazareth race ===
Held September 18 at Nazareth Speedway. Bob Dorricott Jr. won the pole.

Top Five Results

1. Greg Moore
2. André Ribeiro
3. Jeff Ward
4. Steve Robertson
5. Eddie Lawson

=== Laguna Seca race ===
Held October 9 at Mazda Raceway Laguna Seca. André Ribeiro won the pole.

Top Five Results

1. André Ribeiro
2. Pedro Chaves
3. Eddie Lawson
4. Doug Boyer
5. Greg Moore

== Final points standings ==
=== Driver ===
For every race the points were awarded: 20 points to the winner, 16 for runner-up, 14 for third place, 12 for fourth place, 10 for fifth place, 8 for sixth place, 6 seventh place, winding down to 1 points for 12th place. Additional points were awarded to the pole winner (1 point) and to the driver leading the most laps (1 point).

Place	Name	Country	Team	Total points	(United States)	(United States)	(United States)	(United States)	(United States)	(United States)	(Canada)	(United States)	(United States)	(Canada)	(United States)	(United States)
1	Steve Robertson	United Kingdom	Tasman Motorsports	179	16	21	21	22	12	6	20	12	16	16	12	5
2	André Ribeiro	Brazil	Tasman Motorsports	170	12	-	1	12	22	10	16	22	16	21	16	22
3	Greg Moore	Canada	Greg Moore Racing	154	22	16	14	6	10	16	3	6	20	10	21	10
4	Eddie Lawson	United States	Tasman Motorsports	139	14	1	16	16	14	20	10	16	2	6	10	14
5	Pedro Chaves	Portugal	Brian Stewart Racing	132	6	14	6	14	16	16	-	14	10	12	8	16
6	Nick Firestone	United States	Dick Simon Racing	72	-	12	1	10	-	12	14	10	4	-	3	6
7	Alex Padilla	United States	Leading Edge Motorsport	63	-	-	-	8	-	5	12	5	12	15	6	-
8	Doug Boyer	United States	Summitt Motorsports	47	-	6	-	-	8	8	8	-	5	-	-	12
9	David DeSilva	United States	Oliver DeSilva/Brian Stewart Racing	46	8	10	8	-	2	-	-	4	-	2	4	8
10	Buzz Calkins	United States	Bradley Motorsports	41	5	-	5	2	6	3	6	3	8	3	-	-
11	Scott Schubot	United States	TransAtlantic Racing	26	2	5	3	3	-	2	-	2	1	8	-	-
12	Rob Wilson	New Zealand	Team Leisy	22	3	-	10	4	4	-	-	-	-	-	1	-
13	Bob Dorricott Jr.	United States	Dorricott Racing	18	-	3	-	-	-	-	3	-	6	5	1	-
	David Pook	United States	John Martin Racing	18	-	2	12	-	3	-	-	-	-	-	-	1
15	Jeff Ward	United States	John Martin Racing	16	-	-	-	-	-	-	-	-	-	-	14	2
16	Jack Miller	United States	Dick Simon Racing	14	1	4	4	-	1	-	-	-	3	1	-	-
17	Bob Reid	United States	Team Shierson	12	-	-	2	-	-	1	5	-	-	4	-	-
18	Markus Liesner	United States	John Martin Racing	10	10	-	-	-	-	-	-	-	-	-	-	-
19	Chris Smith	United States	Team Leisy	9	4	-	-	5	-	-	-	-	-	-	-	-
20	Rick Hill	United States	K.O.T. Racing	8	-	8	-	-	-	-	-	-	-	-	-	-
	Patrick Carpentier	Canada	Canaska Racing	8	-	-	-	-	-	-	-	8	-	-	-	-
	Roberto Quintanilla	Mexico	Leading Edge Motorsport	8	-	-	-	1	5	-	-	-	-	-	2	-
23	Trevor Seibert	Canada	Canaska Racing	5	-	-	-	-	-	-	-	-	-	-	5	-
24	Frédéric Gosparini	France	Leading Edge Motorsport	4	-	-	-	-	-	4	-	-	-	-	-	-
	Enrique Contreras	Mexico	Team Leisy	4	-	-	-	-	-	-	4	-	-	-	-	-
	Niclas Jönsson	Sweden	McCormack Racing	4	-	-	-	-	-	-	-	-	-	-	-	4
27	Juan Carlos Carbonell	Chile	John Martin Racing	3	-	-	-	-	-	-	-	-	-	-	-	3
28	Sohrab Amirsardari	Canada	John Martin Racing	2	-	-	-	-	-	-	2	-	-	-	-	-
29	Richard Nauert	United States	?	1	-	1	-	-	-	-	-	-	-	-	-	-
	César Jiménez	Mexico	Leading Edge Motorsport	1	-	-	-	-	-	-	-	1	-	-	-	-

== Complete Overview ==
first column of every race	10	= grid position

second column of every race	10	= race result

R20=retired, but classified NS=did not start

Place	Name	Country	Team	(United States)		(United States)		(United States)		(United States)		(United States)		(United States)		(Canada)		(United States)		(United States)		(Canada)		(United States)		(United States)
1	Steve Robertson	United Kingdom	Tasman Motorsports	2	2	2	1	3	1	1	1	2	4	3	7	3	1	9	4	1	3	2	2	4	4	2	8
2	André Ribeiro	Brazil	Tasman Motorsports	5	4	7	R20	1	R17	2	4	1	1	5	5	4	2	1	1	6	2	3	1	6	2	1	1
3	Greg Moore	Canada	Greg Moore Racing	1	1	3	2	4	3	8	7	6	5	4	2	1	12	4	7	3	1	5	5	3	1	9	5
4	Eddie Lawson	United States	Tasman Motorsports	3	3	1	R18	2	2	4	2	3	3	2	1	8	5	2	2	4	11	8	7	9	5	4	3
5	Pedro Chaves	Portugal	Brian Stewart Racing	4	7	4	3	17	7	6	3	4	2	1	3	2	R19	6	3	7	5	4	4	2	6	3	2
6	Nick Firestone	United States	Dick Simon Racing	8	13	5	4	16	R12	5	5	7	15	6	4	7	3	7	5	9	9	9	R15	19	10	12	7
7	Alex Padilla	United States	Leading Edge Motorsport	6	14	9	R17	6	R14	3	6	10	R17	10	8	6	4	3	8	5	4	1	3	7	7	6	13
8	Doug Boyer	United States	Summitt Motorsports	16	17	12	7	10	R16	-	-	8	6	7	6	10	6	-	-	16	8	10	R17	15	R18	11	4
9	David DeSilva	United States	Oliver DeSilva/Brian Stewart Racing	17	6	8	5	9	6	10	15	5	11	8	NS	9	R15	10	9	8	13	6	11	10	9	7	6
10	Buzz Calkins	United States	Bradley Motorsports	11	8	10	14	5	8	14	11	13	7	13	10	12	7	11	10	10	6	15	10	12	R19	17	R19
11	Scott Schubot	United States	TransAtlantic Racing	15	11	16	8	13	10	11	10	14	14	12	11	11	R16	14	11	13	12	13	6	16	15	14	14
12	Rob Wilson	New Zealand	Team Leisy	14	10	15	R21	11	5	13	9	16	9	-	-	-	-	-	-	-	-	-	-	11	12	-	-
13	Bob Dorricott Jr.	United States	Dorricott Racing	13	15	11	10	7	13	12	R14	11	R18	17	R18	16	10	13	14	2	7	12	8	1	R17	16	18
	David Pook	United States	John Martin Racing	-	-	14	11	15	4	7	R16	12	10	14	R15	-	-	-	-	-	-	-	-	-	-	15	12
15	Jeff Ward	United States	John Martin Racing	-	-	-	-	-	-	-	-	-	-	-	-	-	-	-	-	-	-	-	-	8	3	8	11
16	Jack Miller	United States	Dick Simon Racing	7	12	17	9	8	9	17	R18	17	12	18	17	19	14	19	17	11	10	19	12	18	14	21	R21
17	Bob Reid	United States	Team Shierson	18	16	20	R15	14	11	16	R17	20	13	16	12	18	8	18	16	14	14	18	9	14	13	19	16
18	Markus Liesner	United States	John Martin Racing	9	5	?	NS	-	-	-	-	-	-	-	-	-	-	-	-	-	-	-	-	-	-	-	-
19	Chris Smith	United States	Team Leisy	10	9	6	R22	-	-	9	8	9	R16	11	13	15	R18	16	15	-	-	11	R16	-	-	-	-
20	Rick Hill	United States	K.O.T. Racing	-	-	19	6	-	-	-	-	19	R20	-	-	-	-	17	13	-	-	16	R18	-	-	-	-
	Patrick Carpentier	Canada	Canaska Racing	-	-	-	-	-	-	-	-	-	-	-	-	5	R20	8	6	-	-	-	-	-	-	-	-
	Roberto Quintanilla	Mexico	Leading Edge Motorsport	12	R18	13	13	12	R15	15	12	15	8	-	-	14	R17	-	-	-	-	14	R19	13	11	-	-
23	Trevor Seibert	Canada	Canaska Racing	-	-	-	-	-	-	-	-	-	-	-	-	-	-	-	-	-	-	7	13	5	8	-	-
24	Frédéric Gosparini	France	Leading Edge Motorsport	-	-	-	-	-	-	-	-	-	-	15	9	-	-	-	-	-	-	-	-	-	-	5	15
	Enrique Contreras	Mexico	Team Leisy	-	-	-	-	-	-	-	-	-	-	9	14	13	9	-	-	-	-	-	-	-	-	-	-
	Niclas Jönsson	Sweden	McCormack Racing	-	-	-	-	-	-	-	-	-	-	-	-	-	-	-	-	-	-	-	-	-	-	10	9
27	Juan Carlos Carbonell	Chile	John Martin Racing	-	-	-	-	-	-	-	-	-	-	-	-	-	-	-	-	-	-	-	-	-	-	13	10
28	Sohrab Amirsardari	Canada	?	-	-	18	R19	-	-	-	-	-	-	-	-
28	Sohrab Amirsardari	Canada	John Martin Racing													17	11	-	-	12	R16	17	R14	-	-	-	-
29	Richard Nauert	United States	?	-	-	22	12	-	-	-	-	-	-	-	-	-	-	-	-	-	-	-	-	-	-	-	-
	César Jiménez	Mexico	Leading Edge Motorsport	-	-	-	-	-	-	-	-	-	-	-	-	-	-	15	12	-	-	-	-	-	-	18	R17
-	Ray Richter	United States	RaysCar Racing	?	NS	21	R16	-	-	18	13	18	R19	19	16	20	R13	-	-	-	-	-	-	-	-	-	-
-	Harry Puterbaugh	United States	Harry Puterbaugh/Team Leisy	-	-	-	-	-	-	-	-	-	-	-	-	-	-	20	R18	15	15	-	-	17	16	20	R20
-	Tom Stefani	Brazil	John Martin Racing	-	-	-	-	-	-	-	-	-	-	-	-	-	-	12	R19	-	-	-	-	-	-	-	-
