= 2002 24 Hours of Le Mans =

70th 24 Hours of Le Mans endurance race

Previous: 2001	Next: 2003
Index: Races | Winners

Circuit de la Sarthe track

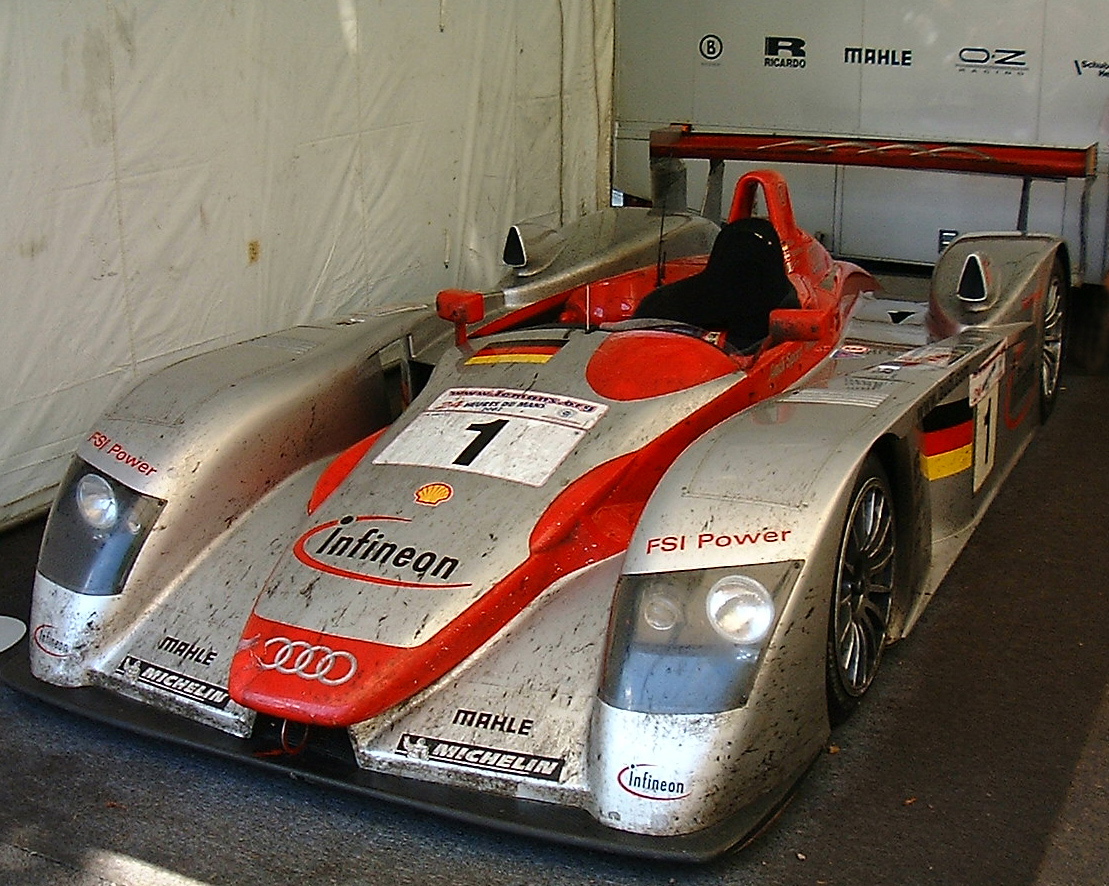
The winning No. 1 Audi R8 LMP900, pictured at The Goodwood Festival of Speed.

The 2002 24 Hours of Le Mans was an automobile endurance race held for Le Mans Prototype and Grand Touring cars from 15 to 16 June 2002 at the Circuit de la Sarthe, close by Le Mans, France. It was the 70th running of the event, as organized by the automotive group, the Automobile Club de l'Ouest (ACO) since 1923. A test day was held five weeks prior to the race on 5 May. The No. 1 Audi Sport Team Joest car of Tom Kristensen, Frank Biela and Emanuele Pirro won the race overall and Audi's third consecutive victory in Le Mans, extending back to the 2000 event.

== Background and circuit changes ==
The 2002 24 Hours of Le Mans was the 70th edition of the event and took place at the 13.880 km (8.625 mi) Circuit de la Sarthe road racing track close to Le Mans, France, from 15 to 16 June. The race was first held in 1923 after the automotive journalist Charles Faroux, the Automobile Club de l'Ouest (ACO) general secretary Georges Durand and the industrialist Emile Coquile agreed to hold a test of vehicle reliability and durability. It is considered the world's most prestigious sports car race and is part of the Triple Crown of Motorsport.

After the Bugatti Circuit was reconstructed, the organisers of the race and automotive group, the ACO, announced improvements requested to the circuit by the governing body of motorcycle racing, the Fédération Internationale de Motocyclisme, between the Dunlop Bridge and the entry to the Esses complex of corners. The track was lengthened by 275 m (301 yd) and widened by 64 m (210 ft) due to the addition of a new left-hand corner for a better transition from the Circuit de la Sarthe to the Bugatti Circuit. New gravel traps were also added to the area. Construction cost ₣15 million and took place from November 2001 to February 2002.

== Entries ==
The ACO received 96 applications by the deadline for entries on 22 February 2002. It granted 48 invitations to the 24 Hours of Le Mans and entries were divided between the LMP900 (Le Mans Prototype 900), LMGTP (Le Mans Grand Touring Prototype), LMP675 (Le Mans Prototype 675), LMGTS (Le Mans Grand Touring Sports) and LMGT (Le Mans Grand Touring) categories. A special invitation category was created by the ACO for the Panoz and Lola prototypes fielded by the DAMS team to allow for the filming of the 2003 film Michel Vaillant by Luc Besson.

=== Automatic entries ===
Eight automatic entry invitations were earned by teams that won their class in the 2001 24 Hours of Le Mans, or victories in two rounds of the worldwide Le Mans Series that the ACO designed as "qualifying events" – the Petit Le Mans of the American Le Mans Series and the 1000km of Estoril of the defunct European Le Mans Series. They were Audi Sport Team Joest in the LMP900 class, Corvette Racing in the LMGTs category and Seikel Motorsport in the LMGT class. Audi and Corvette also earned berths for securing victories in their respective classes at the Petit Le Mans race and Pescarolo Sport of the LMP900 category, GTS entrants Ray Mallock Limited and Freisinger Motorsport in the LMGT class were granted invitations for winning the 1000 km of Estoril. Prototype Technology Group were the only team not to accept their automatic invitation as the team's car supplier BMW had withdrawn from the American Le Mans Series due to a technological dispute.

=== Entry list and reserves ===
On 21 March 2002, the selection committee of the ACO announced the full 50-car entry list for Le Mans, plus six reserves. In addition from the eight guaranteed entries, 17 regular season entries came from the American Le Mans Series, while the remainder of the field was filled with one-off entries only competing at Le Mans. Team Rafanelli announced that their Ferrari 550M would be withdrawn on 26 March, after the team decided to focus on the GTS championship in the American Le Mans Series. This promoted the No. 27 Chamberlain Motorsport MG-Lola EX257 to the race entry as a result and increased the number of LMP675 entries to seven. All of the reserve entries were deleted from the entry list on 31 May.

== Testing ==
A mandatory pre-Le Mans testing day split into two daytime sessions of four hours each was held at the circuit on 5 May, involving all 48 entries as well as all six reserve cars. The two four-hour sessions were held in cold and overcast weather conditions. Audi set the day's pace with a lap of 3 minutes and 30.296 seconds from the No. 2 Audi R8 of Rinaldo Capello in the final ten minutes of the second session, followed by Stéphane Sarrazin in the No. 14 Team Oreca Dallara SP1 in second. Slower traffic restricted Tom Kristensen's No. 1 car to third and his teammate Michael Krumm put the No. 3 vehicle in fourth. The No. 27 MG-Lola EX257 driven by Mark Blundell was fifth overall, and he was in front of the sole LMGTP entry, Eric van de Poele's No. 8 Bentley EXP Speed 8 in sixth overall. In the LMGTS class, Tomáš Enge, driving the No. 58 Prodrive Ferrari 550-GTS Maranello, set the category's fastest time and he was more than two seconds faster than Christophe Bouchut in the No. 50 Larbre Compétition-Chereau-entered Chrysler Viper GTS-R. The No. 81 The Racer's Group-fielded Porsche 911 GT3-RS was the fastest car in the LMGT category, followed by the PK Sport Ltd. Porsche in second and the third-placed JMB Racing Ferrari 360 Modena.

== Qualifying ==
There were eight hours of qualifying divided into four two-hour sessions available to all the entrants on 12 and 13 June. During the sessions, all entrants were required to set a time within 110 percent of the fastest lap established by the fastest vehicle in each category to qualify for the race. Jan Lammers' No. 16 Racing for Holland Dome S101 set an early pace of 3 minutes and 31.355 seconds just before the end of the first qualifying session's first hour. The lap was not bettered by any other car, giving the entry provisional pole position. The fastest Audi R8 was the No. 1 car of Kristensen who was 0.414 seconds slower in second but more than three seconds faster than Capello in third and Krumm in fourth. Olivier Beretta was the fastest Dallara in fifth and van de Poele put the No. 8 Bentley in sixth. A red flag was necessitated when the No. 26 MG-Lola EX257 of Jonny Kane had an engine failure on the Mulsanne Straight and his team changed engines. The first two positions in the LMP675 class were occupied by Warren Hughes and Julian Bailey's MGs, with the No. 28 ROC Organisation Course Reynard 2KQ-LM driven by Mark Smithson in third. Rickard Rydell in the Prodrive Ferrari led the LMGTS category by more than four seconds over the leading Corvette of Andy Pilgrim and the LMGT class was topped by The Racer's Group Porsche 911 of Lucas Luhr. JMB Racing's No. 71 Ferrari got beached in the gravel trap at the Dunlop Curve, bringing an early end to the session with ten minutes to go.

The second qualifying session had Capello go faster than Lammers' time from the first session to take the provisional pole position with a lap of 3 minutes and 30.347 seconds in its eighth minute. Kristensen remained in second as he improved the No. 1 car's best lap. He demoted the No. 16 Racing for Holland Dome of Lammers to third overall although the latter entry bettered its first session time. Krumm's No. 3 Audi maintained fourth and Blundell advanced the No. 27 MG-Lola from seventh to fifth overall despite a collision with a LMGT Porsche through the Tetre Rouge Esses complex of corners at about 135 mph (217 km/h). The MG-Lola crashed into a barrier beside the circuit and damaged its steering arm. Blundell drove the car back to the pit lane for extensive repairs to it. Four minutes before the conclusion of the session, Andy Wallace's No. 8 Bentley and a slower car made contact on the approach to Indianapolis corner, causing the Bentley to run into the trackside gravel trap. Yannick Dalmas in the No. 5 Audi Sport Japan Team Goh car lost his right rear wing endplate from possibly hitting debris on the Mulsanne Straight and the car launched airborne before resting against a barrier. In LMGTS, Oliver Gavin's Chevrolet Corvette C5-R and Alain Menu in the Prodrive Ferrari battled for the provisional pole position with Menu ending the session top of all the entrants in the category with a time of 3 minutes and 56.730 seconds. The LMGT class continued to be led by The Racer's Group Porsche 911.

After the second session, the No. 16 Racing for Holland Dome had all of its lap times deleted due to a fuel infringement caused by possibly its fuel tank not being extensively cleaned. Teams running with more powerful engines for qualifying stopped utilising them and installed the power units they would use for the race in order to comply with an ACO regulation that forbade teams changing engines before the final qualifying session and the race. The 13 June's first qualifying session had Capello improve provisional pole position with a 3 minutes and 29.905 seconds lap that he set late in the session and broke the overall lap record held by Martin Brundle in a Toyota GT-One since the 1999 race. He was followed by Kristensen's No. 2 Audi in second after the latter was delayed by a slower car and Sarrazin's third-placed No. 14 Team Oreca Dallara though he aborted his first timed lap due to traffic. The No. 3 Audi remained in fourth place, and Blundell's No. 27 MG-Lola maintained fifth though his engine failed at the first chicane on the Mulsanne Straight. Dalmas' session was ended early with an electrical failure that caused him to abandon his Audi at the side of the track. Although it stopped on its first lap with a transmission fault, the Prodrive Ferrari continued to lead the LMGTS category, and The Racer's Group Porsche maintained the LMGT class lead despite Luhr making a driver error that put the car into the gravel trap at the Dunlop Chicane, and a broken water sealant when Kevin Buckler was driving the vehicle. The session was stopped halfway through for ten minutes to allow marshals to dry a large amount of spilled oil at the Ford Chicanes.

As temperatures cooled in the final qualifying session, over a third of the field improved their fastest laps, but Capello's pole position time was unchallenged. Kristensen led the session in the No. 2 Audi with a lap of 3 minutes and 30.219 seconds while his teammate Krumm moved the No. 3 car to third place as the Audis concentrated on race testing. It was Audi's third consecutive pole position at Le Mans, extending back to the 2000 event. Franck Montagny and Sarrazin qualified the No. 14 Oreca in fourth and Lammer qualified the Racing for Holland Dome in fifth. The No. 27 MG-Lola fell to sixth as it did not take part in the session as it underwent a change of engine and Beretta put the No. 15 Team Oreca Dallara in seventh. The No. 11 Panoz LMP01 Evo, driven by Bryan Herta, caused the session's only stoppage halfway through the session for ten minutes when the car caught fire and stopped at the Dunlop Chicane. Enge earned Prodrive the LMGTS pole position by improving the class' fastest lap time to a 3 minutes and 54.091 seconds although he damaged the rear of his Ferrari in a crash against a trackside wall. The Racer's Group Porsche 911 of Luhr lowered its best lap to 4 minutes and 10.803 seconds and took pole position in the LMGT category.

=== Qualifying results ===
Pole positions in each class are denoted in bold and by a ‡. The fastest time set by each entry is denoted in gray.

Pos	Class	No.	Team	Car	Time	Gap
**1**	**LMP900**	**2**	**Audi Sport North America**	**Audi R8**	**3:29.905**	—‡
2	LMP900	1	Audi Sport Team Joest	Audi R8	3:30.219	+0.314
3	LMP900	3	Audi Sport Team Joest	Audi R8	3:30.801	+0.896
4	LMP900	14	PlayStation Team Oreca	Dallara SP1	**3:31.828**	+1.923
5	LMP900	16	Racing for Holland	Dome S101	3:32.734	+2.829
**6**	**LMP675**	**27**	**MG Sport & Racing Ltd.**	**MG-Lola EX257**	**3:33.254**	**+3.319‡**
7	LMP900	15	PlayStation Team Oreca	Dallara SP1	3:33.403	+3.398
8	LMP900	7	Team Cadillac	Cadillac Northstar LMP02	3:33.569	+3.564
9	LMP900	11	Panoz Motor Sports	Panoz LMP01 Evo	3:34.824	+4.919
10	LMP900	6	Team Cadillac	Cadillac Northstar LMP02	3:35.042	+5.037
**11**	**LMGTP**	**8**	**Team Bentley**	**Bentley EXP Speed 8**	**3:35.056**	**+5.051‡**
12	LMP675	26	MG Sport & Racing Ltd.	MG-Lola EX257	3:36.694	+6.789
13	LMP900	13	Courage Compétition	Courage C60	3:37.305	+7.037
14	LMP900	21	Team Ascari	Ascari KZR-1	3:37.825	+7.920
15	LMP900	5	Audi Sport Japan Team Goh	Audi R8	3:38.129	+8.124
16	LMP900	4	Riley & Scott Racing	Riley & Scott Mk III C	3:38.548	+8.643
17	LMP900	12	Panoz Motor Sports	Panoz LMP01 Evo	3:39.069	+9.164
18	LMP900	18	Pescarolo Sport	Courage C60	3:41.237	+12.332
19	LMP900	17	Pescarolo Sport	Courage C60	3:41.509	+12.604
20	LMP675	30	Knight Hawk Racing	MG-Lola EX257	3:42.441	+13.536
21	LMP900	22	DAMS	Panoz LMP-1 Roadster-S	3:44.877	+15.982
22	LMP900	9	Kondo Racing	Dome S101	3:45.412	+16.507
23	LMP900	10	DAMS	Lola B98/10	3:47.381	+18.476
24	LMP675	25	Gérard Welter	WR LM2001	3:47.546	+18.641
25	LMP900	19	MBD Sportscar Team	Panoz LMP07	3:49.299	+20.294
26	LMP675	29	Noël del Bello	Reynard 2KQ-LM	3:51.095	+22.290
27	LMP675	28	ROC Organisation Course	Reynard 2KQ-LM	3:51.411	+22.506
**28**	**LMGTS**	**58**	**Prodrive**	**Ferrari 550-GTS Maranello**	**3:54.091**	**+24.096‡**
29	LMGTS	63	Corvette Racing	Chevrolet Corvette C5-R	3:54.903	+24.998
30	LMGTS	50	Larbre Compétition-Chereau	Chrysler Viper GTS-R	3:57.116	+27.111
31	LMGTS	53	Team Carsport Holland	Chrysler Viper GTS-R	3:57.960	+28.055
32	LMGTS	64	Corvette Racing	Chevrolet Corvette C5-R	3:57.972	+28.067
33	LMGTS	66	Konrad Motorsport	Saleen S7-R	3:58.833	+28.778
34	LMGTS	52	Equipe de France FFSA	Chrysler Viper GTS-R	3:59.302	+30.397
35	LMP675	24	Autoexe Motorsports	Autoexe LMP-02	4:01.791	+32.786
36	LMGTS	51	Larbre Compétition-Chereau	Chrysler Viper GTS-R	4:06.331	+37.426
37	LMGTS	68	RML	Saleen S7-R	4:08.223	+38.218
38	LMGTS	67	Konrad Motorsport	Saleen S7-R	4:08.549	+38.544
**39**	**LMGT**	**81**	**The Racer's Group**	**Porsche 911 GT3-RS**	**4:10.803**	**+41.797‡**
40	LMGT	80	Freisinger Motorsport	Porsche 911 GT3-RS	4:12.698	+42.693
41	LMGT	82	Freisinger Motorsport	Porsche 911 GT3-RS	4:12.908	+43.003
42	LMGT	78	PK Sport Ltd.	Porsche 911 GT3-RS	4:13.912	+44.007
43	LMGT	75	Orbit	Porsche 911 GT3-RS	4:15.488	+45.483
44	LMGT	70	JMB Racing	Ferrari 360 Modena GT	4:15.951	+46.046
45	LMGT	77	Team Taisan Advan	Porsche 911 GT3-RS	4:15.989	+46.094
46	LMGT	73	DeWalt-Racesport Salisbury	Morgan Aero 8	4:16.847	+47.842
47	LMGT	72	Luc Alphand Adventures	Porsche 911 GT3-RS	4:19.234	+50.229
48	LMGT	74	Auto Palace	Ferrari 360 Modena GT	4:19.536	+50.531
49	LMGT	85	Spyker Automobielen BV	Spyker C8 Double-12R	4:19.969	+51.064
50	LMGT	71	JMB Racing	Ferrari 360 Modena GT	4:27.313	+58.208
Pos	Class	No.	Team	Car	Time	Gap

== Race ==
The 2002 edition saw Audi Sport Team Joest, with drivers Frank Biela, Tom Kristensen, and Emanuele Pirro, taking their third victory not only as a team and manufacturer, but also as a driving team, marking the first time a set of three drivers won the event three years in a row.

== Official results ==
Pos	Class	No	Team	Drivers	Chassis	Tyre	Laps
Pos	Class	No	Team	Drivers	Engine	Tyre	Laps
1	LMP900	1	(Germany) Audi Sport Team Joest	(Germany) Frank Biela (Denmark) Tom Kristensen (Italy) Emanuele Pirro	Audi R8	M	375
1	LMP900	1	(Germany) Audi Sport Team Joest	(Germany) Frank Biela (Denmark) Tom Kristensen (Italy) Emanuele Pirro	Audi 3.6 L Turbo V8	M	375
2	LMP900	2	(Germany) Audi Sport North America	(United Kingdom) Johnny Herbert (Italy) Christian Pescatori (Italy) Rinaldo Capello	Audi R8	M	374
2	LMP900	2	(Germany) Audi Sport North America	(United Kingdom) Johnny Herbert (Italy) Christian Pescatori (Italy) Rinaldo Capello	Audi 3.6 L Turbo V8	M	374
3	LMP900	3	(Germany) Audi Sport Team Joest	(Germany) Marco Werner (Germany) Michael Krumm (Austria) Philipp Peter	Audi R8	M	372
3	LMP900	3	(Germany) Audi Sport Team Joest	(Germany) Marco Werner (Germany) Michael Krumm (Austria) Philipp Peter	Audi 3.6 L Turbo V8	M	372
4	LMGTP	8	(United Kingdom) Team Bentley	(United Kingdom) Andy Wallace (Belgium) Eric van de Poele (United States) Butch Leitzinger	Bentley EXP Speed 8	D	362
4	LMGTP	8	(United Kingdom) Team Bentley	(United Kingdom) Andy Wallace (Belgium) Eric van de Poele (United States) Butch Leitzinger	Bentley 4.0 L Turbo V8	D	362
5	LMP900	15	(France) PlayStation Team Oreca	(Monaco) Olivier Beretta (France) Érik Comas (Portugal) Pedro Lamy	Dallara SP1	M	359
5	LMP900	15	(France) PlayStation Team Oreca	(Monaco) Olivier Beretta (France) Érik Comas (Portugal) Pedro Lamy	Judd GV4 4.0 L V10	M	359
6	LMP900	14	(France) PlayStation Team Oreca	(France) Stéphane Sarrazin (France) Franck Montagny (France) Nicolas Minassian	Dallara SP1	M	359
6	LMP900	14	(France) PlayStation Team Oreca	(France) Stéphane Sarrazin (France) Franck Montagny (France) Nicolas Minassian	Judd GV4 4.0 L V10	M	359
7	LMP900	5	Audi Sport Japan Team Goh	(Japan) Hiroki Katoh (France) Yannick Dalmas (Japan) Seiji Ara	Audi R8	M	358
7	LMP900	5	Audi Sport Japan Team Goh	(Japan) Hiroki Katoh (France) Yannick Dalmas (Japan) Seiji Ara	Audi 3.6 L Turbo V8	M	358
8	LMP900	16	(Netherlands) Racing for Holland	(Netherlands) Jan Lammers (Netherlands) Tom Coronel (Netherlands) Val Hillebrand	Dome S101	M	351
8	LMP900	16	(Netherlands) Racing for Holland	(Netherlands) Jan Lammers (Netherlands) Tom Coronel (Netherlands) Val Hillebrand	Judd GV4 4.0 L V10	M	351
9	LMP900	6	(United States) Team Cadillac	(South Africa) Wayne Taylor (Italy) Max Angelelli (France) Christophe Tinseau	Cadillac Northstar LMP02	M	345
9	LMP900	6	(United States) Team Cadillac	(South Africa) Wayne Taylor (Italy) Max Angelelli (France) Christophe Tinseau	Cadillac Northstar 4.0 L Turbo V8	M	345
10	LMP900	17	(France) Pescarolo Sport	(France) Sébastien Bourdais (France) Jean-Christophe Boullion (France) Franck Lagorce	Courage C60	M	343
10	LMP900	17	(France) Pescarolo Sport	(France) Sébastien Bourdais (France) Jean-Christophe Boullion (France) Franck Lagorce	Peugeot A32 3.2 L Turbo V6	M	343
11	LMGTS	63	(United States) Corvette Racing	(Canada) Ron Fellows (United States) Johnny O'Connell (United Kingdom) Oliver Gavin	Chevrolet Corvette C5-R	G	335
11	LMGTS	63	(United States) Corvette Racing	(Canada) Ron Fellows (United States) Johnny O'Connell (United Kingdom) Oliver Gavin	Chevrolet LS7R 7.0 L V8	G	335
12	LMP900	7	(United States) Team Cadillac	(France) Éric Bernard (France) Emmanuel Collard (Finland) JJ Lehto	Cadillac Northstar LMP02	M	334
12	LMP900	7	(United States) Team Cadillac	(France) Éric Bernard (France) Emmanuel Collard (Finland) JJ Lehto	Cadillac Northstar 4.0 L Turbo V8	M	334
13	LMGTS	64	(United States) Corvette Racing	(United States) Andy Pilgrim (United States) Kelly Collins (France) Franck Fréon	Chevrolet Corvette C5-R	G	331
13	LMGTS	64	(United States) Corvette Racing	(United States) Andy Pilgrim (United States) Kelly Collins (France) Franck Fréon	Chevrolet LS7R 7.0 L V8	G	331
14	LMGTS	52	Equipe de France FFSA	(France) Jonathan Cochet (France) Benoît Tréluyer (France) Jean-Philippe Belloc	Chrysler Viper GTS-R	M	326
14	LMGTS	52	Equipe de France FFSA	(France) Jonathan Cochet (France) Benoît Tréluyer (France) Jean-Philippe Belloc	Chrysler 8.0 L V10	M	326
15	LMP900	13	(France) Courage Compétition	(France) Didier Cottaz (France) Boris Derichebourg (Sweden) Thed Björk	Courage C60	M	322
15	LMP900	13	(France) Courage Compétition	(France) Didier Cottaz (France) Boris Derichebourg (Sweden) Thed Björk	Judd GV4 4.0 L V10	M	322
16	LMGT	81	(United States) The Racer's Group	(United States) Kevin Buckler (Germany) Lucas Luhr (Germany) Timo Bernhard	Porsche 911 GT3-RS	M	322
16	LMGT	81	(United States) The Racer's Group	(United States) Kevin Buckler (Germany) Lucas Luhr (Germany) Timo Bernhard	Porsche 3.6 L Flat-6	M	322
17	LMGT	80	(Germany) Freisinger Motorsport	(France) Romain Dumas (Germany) Sascha Maassen (Germany) Jörg Bergmeister	Porsche 911 GT3-RS	D	321
17	LMGT	80	(Germany) Freisinger Motorsport	(France) Romain Dumas (Germany) Sascha Maassen (Germany) Jörg Bergmeister	Porsche 3.6 L Flat-6	D	321
18	LMGTS	50	(France) Larbre Compétition-Chereau	(France) Christophe Bouchut (France) Patrice Goueslard (Belgium) Vincent Vosse	Chrysler Viper GTS-R	M	319
18	LMGTS	50	(France) Larbre Compétition-Chereau	(France) Christophe Bouchut (France) Patrice Goueslard (Belgium) Vincent Vosse	Chrysler 8.0 L V10	M	319
19	LMP675	29	(France) Noël del Bello	(Switzerland) Jean-Denis Délétraz (Switzerland) Christophe Pillon (Austria) Walter Lechner, Jr.	Reynard 2KQ-LM	M	317
19	LMP675	29	(France) Noël del Bello	(Switzerland) Jean-Denis Délétraz (Switzerland) Christophe Pillon (Austria) Walter Lechner, Jr.	Volkswagen HPT16 2.0 L I4	M	317
20	LMP675	25	(France) Gérard Welter	(France) Jean-René de Fournoux (France) Stéphane Daoudi (France) Jean-Bernard Bouvet	WR LM2001	M	317
20	LMP675	25	(France) Gérard Welter	(France) Jean-René de Fournoux (France) Stéphane Daoudi (France) Jean-Bernard Bouvet	Peugeot 2.0 L Turbo I4	M	317
21	LMGT	77	(Japan) Team Taisan Advan	(Japan) Atsushi Yogo (Japan) Akira Iida (Japan) Kazuyuki Nishizawa	Porsche 911 GT3-RS	Y	316
21	LMGT	77	(Japan) Team Taisan Advan	(Japan) Atsushi Yogo (Japan) Akira Iida (Japan) Kazuyuki Nishizawa	Porsche 3.6 L Flat-6	Y	316
22	LMGT	82	(Germany) Seikel Motorsport	(Italy) Gabrio Rosa (Italy) Luca Drudi (Italy) Luca Riccitelli	Porsche 911 GT3-RS	Y	315
22	LMGT	82	(Germany) Seikel Motorsport	(Italy) Gabrio Rosa (Italy) Luca Drudi (Italy) Luca Riccitelli	Porsche 3.6 L Flat-6	Y	315
23	LMGTS	68	(United Kingdom) RML	(Portugal) Pedro Chaves (Portugal) Miguel Ramos (United Kingdom) Gavin Pickering	Saleen S7-R	D	312
23	LMGTS	68	(United Kingdom) RML	(Portugal) Pedro Chaves (Portugal) Miguel Ramos (United Kingdom) Gavin Pickering	Ford 6.9 L V8	D	312
24	LMGT	72	(France) Luc Alphand Adventures	(France) Luc Alphand (France) Christian Lavieille (France) Olivier Thévenin	Porsche 911 GT3-RS	D	299
24	LMGT	72	(France) Luc Alphand Adventures	(France) Luc Alphand (France) Christian Lavieille (France) Olivier Thévenin	Porsche 3.6 L Flat-6	D	299
25	LMGTS	51	(France) Larbre Compétition-Chereau	(France) Jean-Luc Chéreau (Sweden) Carl Rosenblad (France) Jean-Claude Lagniez	Chrysler Viper GTS-R	M	278
25	LMGTS	51	(France) Larbre Compétition-Chereau	(France) Jean-Luc Chéreau (Sweden) Carl Rosenblad (France) Jean-Claude Lagniez	Chrysler 8.0 L V10	M	278
26	LMGTS	66	(Germany) Konrad Motorsport	(United States) Terry Borcheller (Switzerland) Toni Seiler (Austria) Franz Konrad	Saleen S7-R	P	266
26	LMGTS	66	(Germany) Konrad Motorsport	(United States) Terry Borcheller (Switzerland) Toni Seiler (Austria) Franz Konrad	Ford 6.9 L V8	P	266
NC	LMP900	10	(France) DAMS	(France) Philippe Gache (France) Emmanuel Clérico (Belgium) Michel Neugarten	Lola B98/10	M	150
NC	LMP900	10	(France) DAMS	(France) Philippe Gache (France) Emmanuel Clérico (Belgium) Michel Neugarten	Judd GV4 4.0 L V10	M	150
DNF	LMP900	19	(United States) MBD Sportscar Team	(Belgium) Didier de Radiguès (Venezuela) Milka Duno (Canada) John Graham	Panoz LMP07	A	259
DNF	LMP900	19	(United States) MBD Sportscar Team	(Belgium) Didier de Radiguès (Venezuela) Milka Duno (Canada) John Graham	Mugen MF408S 4.0 L V8	A	259
DNF	LMP900	12	(United States) Panoz Motor Sports	(United States) Bill Auberlen (United States) David Donohue (United States) Gunnar Jeannette	Panoz LMP01 Evo	M	230
DNF	LMP900	12	(United States) Panoz Motor Sports	(United States) Bill Auberlen (United States) David Donohue (United States) Gunnar Jeannette	Élan 6L8 6.0 L V8	M	230
DNF	LMP675	27	(United Kingdom) MG Sport & Racing Ltd.	(United Kingdom) Mark Blundell (United Kingdom) Julian Bailey (United Kingdom) Kevin McGarrity	MG-Lola EX257	M	219
DNF	LMP675	27	(United Kingdom) MG Sport & Racing Ltd.	(United Kingdom) Mark Blundell (United Kingdom) Julian Bailey (United Kingdom) Kevin McGarrity	MG XP20 2.0 L Turbo I4	M	219
DNF	LMP900	4	(United States) Riley & Scott Racing	(Belgium) Marc Goossens (United States) Jim Matthews (Belgium) Didier Theys	Riley & Scott Mk III C	G	189
DNF	LMP900	4	(United States) Riley & Scott Racing	(Belgium) Marc Goossens (United States) Jim Matthews (Belgium) Didier Theys	Élan 6L8 6.0 L V8	G	189
DNF	LMP900	9	(Japan) Kondo Racing	(Japan) Masahiko Kondo (United Kingdom) Ian McKellar Jr. (France) François Migault	Dome S101	M	182
DNF	LMP900	9	(Japan) Kondo Racing	(Japan) Masahiko Kondo (United Kingdom) Ian McKellar Jr. (France) François Migault	Judd GV4 4.0 L V10	M	182
DNF	LMGT	73	(United Kingdom) DeWalt-Racesport Salisbury	(United Kingdom) Richard Stanton (United Kingdom) Steve Hyde (United Kingdom) Richard Hayes	Morgan Aero 8	D	181
DNF	LMGT	73	(United Kingdom) DeWalt-Racesport Salisbury	(United Kingdom) Richard Stanton (United Kingdom) Steve Hyde (United Kingdom) Richard Hayes	BMW 4.0 L V8	D	181
DNF	LMGTS	58	(United Kingdom) Prodrive	(Sweden) Rickard Rydell (Switzerland) Alain Menu (Czech Republic) Tomáš Enge	Ferrari 550-GTS Maranello	M	174
DNF	LMGTS	58	(United Kingdom) Prodrive	(Sweden) Rickard Rydell (Switzerland) Alain Menu (Czech Republic) Tomáš Enge	Ferrari 5.9 L V12	M	174
DNF	LMGT	75	(United States) Orbit	(United States) Leo Hindery, Jr. (United States) Peter Baron (United States) Anthony Kester	Porsche 911 GT3-RS	M	165
DNF	LMGT	75	(United States) Orbit	(United States) Leo Hindery, Jr. (United States) Peter Baron (United States) Anthony Kester	Porsche 3.6 L Flat-6	M	165
DNF	LMP900	18	(France) Pescarolo Sport	(France) Éric Hélary (Monaco) Stéphane Ortelli (Japan) Ukyo Katayama	Courage C60	M	144
DNF	LMP900	18	(France) Pescarolo Sport	(France) Éric Hélary (Monaco) Stéphane Ortelli (Japan) Ukyo Katayama	Peugeot A32 3.2 L Turbo V6	M	144
DNF	LMGT	85	(Netherlands) Spyker Automobielen BV	(Netherlands) Peter Kox (Germany) Norman Simon (Netherlands) Hans Hugenholtz	Spyker C8 Double-12R	D	142
DNF	LMGT	85	(Netherlands) Spyker Automobielen BV	(Netherlands) Peter Kox (Germany) Norman Simon (Netherlands) Hans Hugenholtz	BMW 4.0 L V8	D	142
DNF	LMP675	26	(United Kingdom) MG Sport & Racing Ltd.	(United Kingdom) Anthony Reid (United Kingdom) Warren Hughes (United Kingdom) Jonny Kane	MG-Lola EX257	M	129
DNF	LMP675	26	(United Kingdom) MG Sport & Racing Ltd.	(United Kingdom) Anthony Reid (United Kingdom) Warren Hughes (United Kingdom) Jonny Kane	MG XP20 2.0 L Turbo I4	M	129
DNF	LMP675	28	(France) ROC Organisation Course	(Spain) Jordi Gené (United Kingdom) Mark Smithson (United Kingdom) Peter Owen	Reynard 2KQ-LM	M	126
DNF	LMP675	28	(France) ROC Organisation Course	(Spain) Jordi Gené (United Kingdom) Mark Smithson (United Kingdom) Peter Owen	Volkswagen HPT16 2.0 L I4	M	126
DNF	LMGT	74	(France) Auto Palace	(France) Guillaume Gomez (Japan) Ryo Fukuda (France) Laurent Cazenave	Ferrari 360 Modena GT	P	119
DNF	LMGT	74	(France) Auto Palace	(France) Guillaume Gomez (Japan) Ryo Fukuda (France) Laurent Cazenave	Ferrari 3.6 L V8	P	119
DNF	LMP675	30	(United States) Knight Hawk Racing	(United States) Steve Knight (United States) Mel Hawkins (United States) Duncan Dayton	MG-Lola EX257	A	102
DNF	LMP675	30	(United States) Knight Hawk Racing	(United States) Steve Knight (United States) Mel Hawkins (United States) Duncan Dayton	MG XP20 2.0 L Turbo I4	A	102
DNF	LMP900	22	(France) DAMS	(France) Jérôme Policand (Belgium) Marc Duez (United Kingdom) Perry McCarthy	Panoz LMP-1 Roadster-S	M	98
DNF	LMP900	22	(France) DAMS	(France) Jérôme Policand (Belgium) Marc Duez (United Kingdom) Perry McCarthy	Élan 6L8 6.0 L V8	M	98
DNF	LMGTS	53	(Netherlands) Team Carsport Holland	(Netherlands) Mike Hezemans (Italy) Gabriele Matteuzzi (Belgium) Anthony Kumpen	Chrysler Viper GTS-R	P	93
DNF	LMGTS	53	(Netherlands) Team Carsport Holland	(Netherlands) Mike Hezemans (Italy) Gabriele Matteuzzi (Belgium) Anthony Kumpen	Chrysler 8.0 L V10	P	93
DNF	LMP900	11	(United States) Panoz Motor Sports	(Australia) David Brabham (Denmark) Jan Magnussen (United States) Bryan Herta	Panoz LMP01 Evo	M	90
DNF	LMP900	11	(United States) Panoz Motor Sports	(Australia) David Brabham (Denmark) Jan Magnussen (United States) Bryan Herta	Élan 6L8 6.0 L V8	M	90
DNF	LMGT	71	(France) JMB Racing	(United States) Steve Earle (United States) Chris MacAllister (United States) Gary Schultheis	Ferrari 360 Modena GT	P	85
DNF	LMGT	71	(France) JMB Racing	(United States) Steve Earle (United States) Chris MacAllister (United States) Gary Schultheis	Ferrari 3.6 L V8	P	85
DNF	LMGTS	67	(Germany) Konrad Motorsport	(Switzerland) Walter Brun (United States) Charles Slater (United States) Rodney Mall	Saleen S7-R	P	83
DNF	LMGTS	67	(Germany) Konrad Motorsport	(Switzerland) Walter Brun (United States) Charles Slater (United States) Rodney Mall	Ford 6.9 L V8	P	83
DNF	LMGT	78	(United Kingdom) PK Sport Ltd.	(United Kingdom) Robin Liddell (United Kingdom) David Warnock (United Kingdom) Piers Masarati	Porsche 911 GT3-RS	P	83
DNF	LMGT	78	(United Kingdom) PK Sport Ltd.	(United Kingdom) Robin Liddell (United Kingdom) David Warnock (United Kingdom) Piers Masarati	Porsche 3.6 L Flat-6	P	83
DNF	LMP900	21	(United Kingdom) Team Ascari	(South Africa) Werner Lupberger (United Kingdom) Ben Collins (United States) Timothy J. Bell	Ascari KZR-1	D	17
DNF	LMP900	21	(United Kingdom) Team Ascari	(South Africa) Werner Lupberger (United Kingdom) Ben Collins (United States) Timothy J. Bell	Judd GV4 4.0 L V10	D	17
DNF	LMGT	70	(France) JMB Racing	(United States) Cort Wagner (United Kingdom) Sam Hancock (United Kingdom) Martin Short	Ferrari 360 Modena GT	P	16
DNF	LMGT	70	(France) JMB Racing	(United States) Cort Wagner (United Kingdom) Sam Hancock (United Kingdom) Martin Short	Ferrari 3.6 L V8	P	16
DNF	LMP675	24	(Japan) Autoexe Motorsports	(Japan) Yojiro Terada (United States) John Fergus (United States) Jim Downing	Autoexe LMP-02	A	5
DNF	LMP675	24	(Japan) Autoexe Motorsports	(Japan) Yojiro Terada (United States) John Fergus (United States) Jim Downing	Mazda R26B 2.6 L 4-Rotor	A	5

=== Statistics ===
- Fastest Lap – #1 Audi Sport Team Joest – 3:33.483
- Distance – 5118.75 km
- Average Speed – 213.068 km/h
- Highest Trap Speed – Audi R8 – 340 km/h (race), Dome Judd S101 Racing for Holland – 340 km/h (race)
