= Nick Firestone =

American racing driver (born 1966)

- Born: Nicholas Stanley Firestone; March 31, 1966 (age 60) Phoenix, Arizona, U.S.

Previous series
- 1990 1992 1993-96 1999 1996-2008: EFDA Nations Cup; British Formula 2 Championship; Indy Lights; IndyCar Series; Karting
- Statistics up to date as of November 30, 2011.

Nicholas Stanley Firestone (born March 31, 1966) is an American former race car driver.

A great-grandson of Harvey Samuel Firestone (founder of the Firestone Tire and Rubber Company) and Idabelle Smith, grandson of Roger (1912–1970) and son of Peter, he graduated from Princeton University in 1989.

Starting in karts, Firestone moved to junior formula cars and finally on the British Formula 2 Championship. He competed in 42 Indy Lights races from 1993 to 1996. His best finish was second at Nazareth Speedway and The Milwaukee Mile in 1993. He attempted to qualify for the 1999 Indianapolis 500 for McCormack Motorsports but failed to make the field. He has now moved back to racing karts. He has two children, Peter and Annabel.

== Career Results ==
=== Karting career ===
Season	Series	Position
1996	SKUSA SuperNationals XIV - G1	6th
2006	SKUSA SuperNationals X - G1	7th
2007	SKUSA SuperNationals X - G1	5th
2008	Arizona Sprint Kart Championship - Shifter	15th
2010	SKUSA SuperNationals X - G1	6th
2011	SKUSA SuperNationals XV - S4 Master	6th
2011	SKUSA Pro-Tour - S4	**2nd**
2012	SKUSA SuperNationals XVI - S4 Master	43rd
2012	SKUSA Pro-Tour - S4	12th
2013	SKUSA SuperNationals XVII - S4 Master	22nd
2014	SKUSA SuperNationals XVII - S4 Master	28th
2014	SKUSA Pro-Tour - S4	10th
2015	SKUSA Pro-Tour - S4	6th
2016	SKUSA SuperNationals XX - S4 Super Master	**2nd**
2017	SKUSA SuperNationals XXI - S4 Super Master	5th

=== Circuit career ===
Season	Series	Position	Car	Team
1990	EFDA Nations Cup	12th	Reynard - Opel	Team USA
1990	USAC FF2000 National Championship Central	29th	Reynard - Ford	
1991	Formula Opel Lotus Eurocup	22nd	Reynard - Opel	?
1992	British Formula 2 Championship	13th	Ralt RT23 - Cosworth	Valvoline ERM
1993	Indy Lights	6th	Lola T93/20 - Buick	Simon Racing
1994	Indy Lights	6th	Lola T93/20 - Buick	Simon Racing
1995	Indy Lights	9th	Lola T93/20 - Buick	Brian Stewart Racing
1996	Indy Lights	17th	Lola T93/20 - Buick	Brian Stewart Racing
2024	Off-Road Pro Stock SxS Division	24th	Polaris	

=== American Open-Wheel racing results ===
(key) (Races in bold indicate pole position, races in italics indicate fastest race lap)

==== USAC FF2000 Championship results ====
Year	Entrant	1	2	3	4	5	6	7	8	9	Pos	Points
1990		WSR1	MMR	WSR2	CAJ	WSR3	SON1	FIR	SON2	PIR; 4	29th	13

==== Indy Lights results ====
Year	Team	1	2	3	4	5	6	7	8	9	10	11	12	Rank	Points
1993	Simon Racing	PHX; 13	LBH; 20	MIL; 2	DET; 13	POR; 6	CLE; 11	TOR; 6	NHM; 8	VAN; 4	MDO; 5	NZR; 2	LS; 6	**6th**	**85**
1994	Simon Racing	PHX; 13	LBH; 4	MIL; 12	DET; 5	POR; 15	CLE; 4	TOR; 3	NHM; 5	VAN; 9	MDO; 15	NZR; 10	LS; 7	**6th**	**72**
1995	Brian Stewart Racing	MIA; 10	PHX; 11	LBH; 12	NZR; 19	MIL; 15	DET; 4	POR; 3	TOR; 23	CLE; 10	NHM; 10	VAN; 9	LS; 5	**9th**	**52**
1996	Brian Stewart Racing	MIA	PHX	NZR	MIS; 11	MIL; 16	DET; 20	POR; 9	CLE; 4	TOR; 19	TRV	VAN	LS	**17th**	**18**

==== IndyCar Series ====
Year	Team	Chassis	No.	Engine	1	2	3	4	5	6	7	8	9	10	11	Rank	Points	Ref
1999	McCormack Motorsports	G-Force GF01C	31	Oldsmobile Aurora V8	WDW	PHX	CLT	INDY; DNQ	TXS1	PPIR1	ATL	DOV	PPIR2	LVS	TX2	NC	0	

===== Indianapolis 500 results =====
Year	Team	Chassis	Engine	Start	Finish
1999	McCormack Motorsports	G-Force GF01C	Oldsmobile	DNQ	
