= John Martin (American racing driver) =

American racing driver (1939–2019)

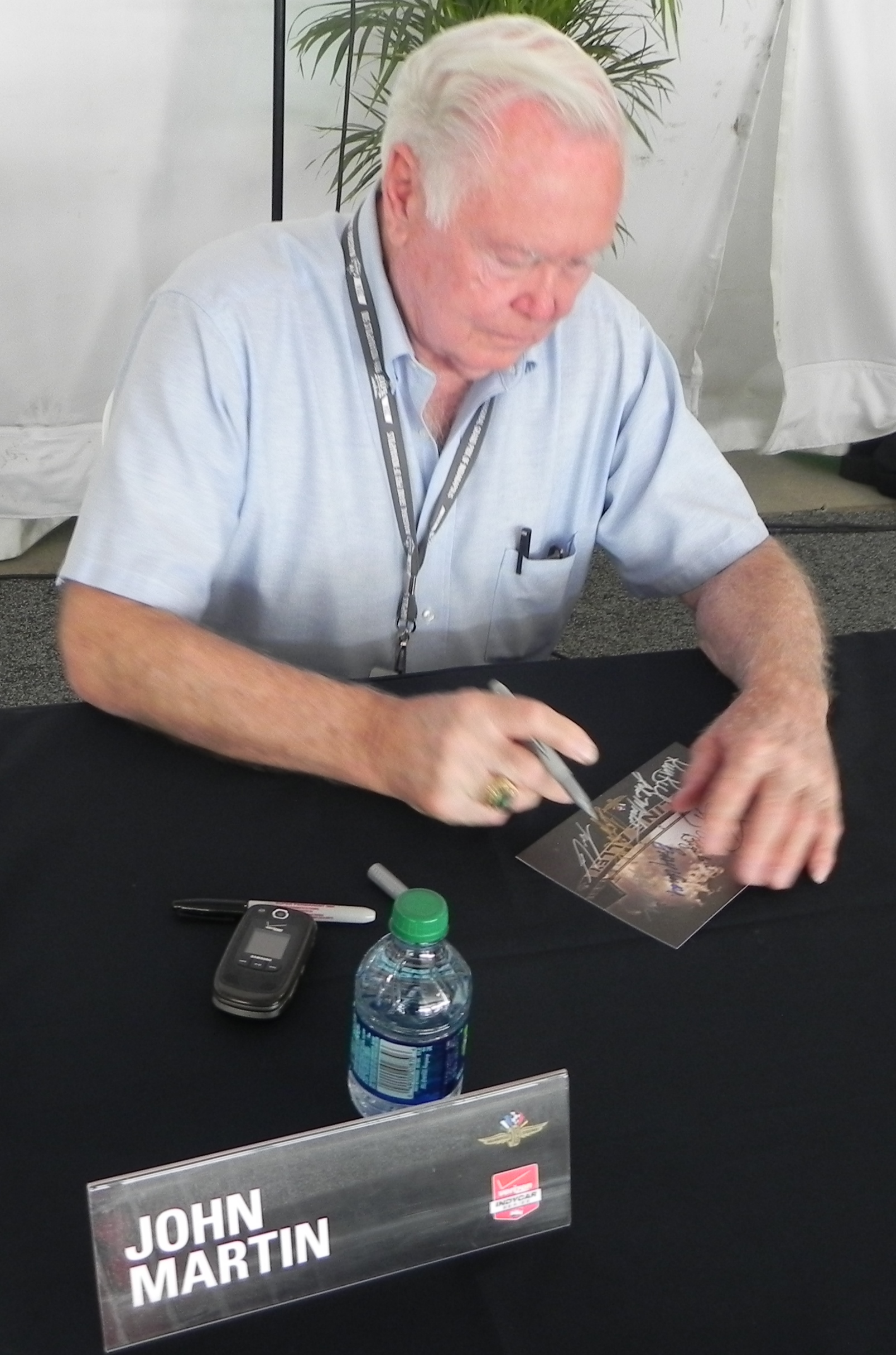
- Martin at the 2014 Indianapolis 500
- Born: 20 March 1939; Cushing, Oklahoma, U.S.
- Died: 20 November 2019 (aged 80); Indianapolis, Indiana, U.S.
- Relatives: John Martin, Jr. (son)

John Martin (March 20, 1939 – November 20, 2019) was an American driver in the USAC and CART Championship Car series.

== Career ==
Martin started racing with the Sports Car Club of America during the 1960s. He converted a 1963 Corvette Stingray into a racecar and drove it to win an SCCA national title in 1965. He competed in USAC stock car races between 1966 and 1969. Martin placed 11th in points in the 1970 SCCA Continental Championship.

Martin worked for the AMC Javelin Racing Team throughout the 1968 Trans-American Championship, serving as chief mechanic for Peter Revson and George Follmer. At the Mid-Ohio round, the team owner asked Martin to qualify Follmer's car since Follmer was racing in USAC at Mosport on Saturday. Martin agreed on the condition that he could drive in the race if he won the pole, which the owner dismissively accepted. Martin indeed won the pole, and went on to lead the race until his engine failed with nine laps to go. He was given a drive for 1969 but did not finish any of the seven races in which he competed.

Martin built a friendship with Revson that eventually helped him to purchase a McLaren M16 for the 1973 Indianapolis 500, where we went on to score his career best finish in the race with eighth position. Martin raced in the 1970-1977 and 1979-1980 USAC Championship Car seasons, with 52 career starts, including the 1972-1976 Indianapolis 500 races. He finished in the top-ten 17 times, with his best finish in fifth position at Ontario Motor Speedway in both 1973 and 1975. His best points result was 11th in the 1975 USAC Championship Car season.

Additionally, Martin competed in a total of seven NASCAR Cup Series races in 1967, 1974 and 1975. He never had a car capable of going the full distance, but recorded a best finishing position of 18th at Riverside International Raceway in 1967. He made a handful of IMSA appearances in 1983 and 1984, with a best result of fifth in the GTU class at Portland International Raceway in 1983.

Martin remained involved in motorsport long after his retirement as a driver, finding employment as an engineer, fabricator and spotter for various organizations. He worked at a shop owned by Bill Throckmorton (owner of Top Gun Racing) restoring vintage racing engines up until his death. Martin took part in the VROC Charity Pro-Am Race at Indianapolis Motor Speedway every year since its inauguration in 2014 until 2019.

Martin ran the Indy Lights team John Martin Racing from 1991 to 1994, with his son John Martin, Jr. serving as mechanic. The team fielded drivers such as Adrián Fernández, Franck Fréon and Jeff Ward. The Martin family developed a strong relationship with Fernández and played a central role in his IRL team Super Aguri Fernández Racing. John, Jr. joined the team as a mechanic and as a fueler on the pit crew of Kosuke Matsuura, while John, Sr. worked as a spotter for Roger Yasukawa and Matsuura.

John Martin, Jr. died in a freak body surfing accident in Nassau, Bahamas on 29 October 2004. He had joined several thousand members of the IRL on a three-day "Celebration Cruise" to commemorate the end of the 2004 IndyCar Series. He was 30 years old.

Martin lived in Missouri, Wisconsin, California and Indiana at various points in his life.

== Racing record ==
=== Indianapolis 500 results ===
| Year | Chassis | Engine | Start | Finish |
|---|---|---|---|---|
| 1971 | Brabham | Offy | Failed to Qualify | |
| 1972 | Brabham | Offy | 14th | 16th |
| 1973 | McLaren | Offy | 24th | 8th |
| 1974 | McLaren | Offy | 22nd | 11th |
| 1975 | McLaren | Offy | 16th | 27th |
| 1976 | King | Offy | 15th | 21st |
| 1977 | Eagle | Offy | Failed to Qualify | |
| 1978 | Eagle | Offy | Failed to Qualify | |
| 1979 | McLaren | Offy | Failed to Qualify | |
| 1980 | Wildcat | DGS | Failed to Qualify | |
| 1981 | McLaren | Offy | Failed to Qualify | |
| 1982 | Vollstedt | Offy | Failed to Qualify | |

=== Complete 24 Hours of Daytona results ===
| Year | Team | Co-Drivers | Car | Class | Laps | Pos. | Class Pos. |
|---|---|---|---|---|---|---|---|
| 1983 | (United States) Avanti | (United States) Herb Adams (United States) Joe Ruttman (United States) Leonard Emanuelson | Avanti II | GTO | 410 | 27th | 13th |
