= Dominique Dupuy (racing driver) =

French racing driver

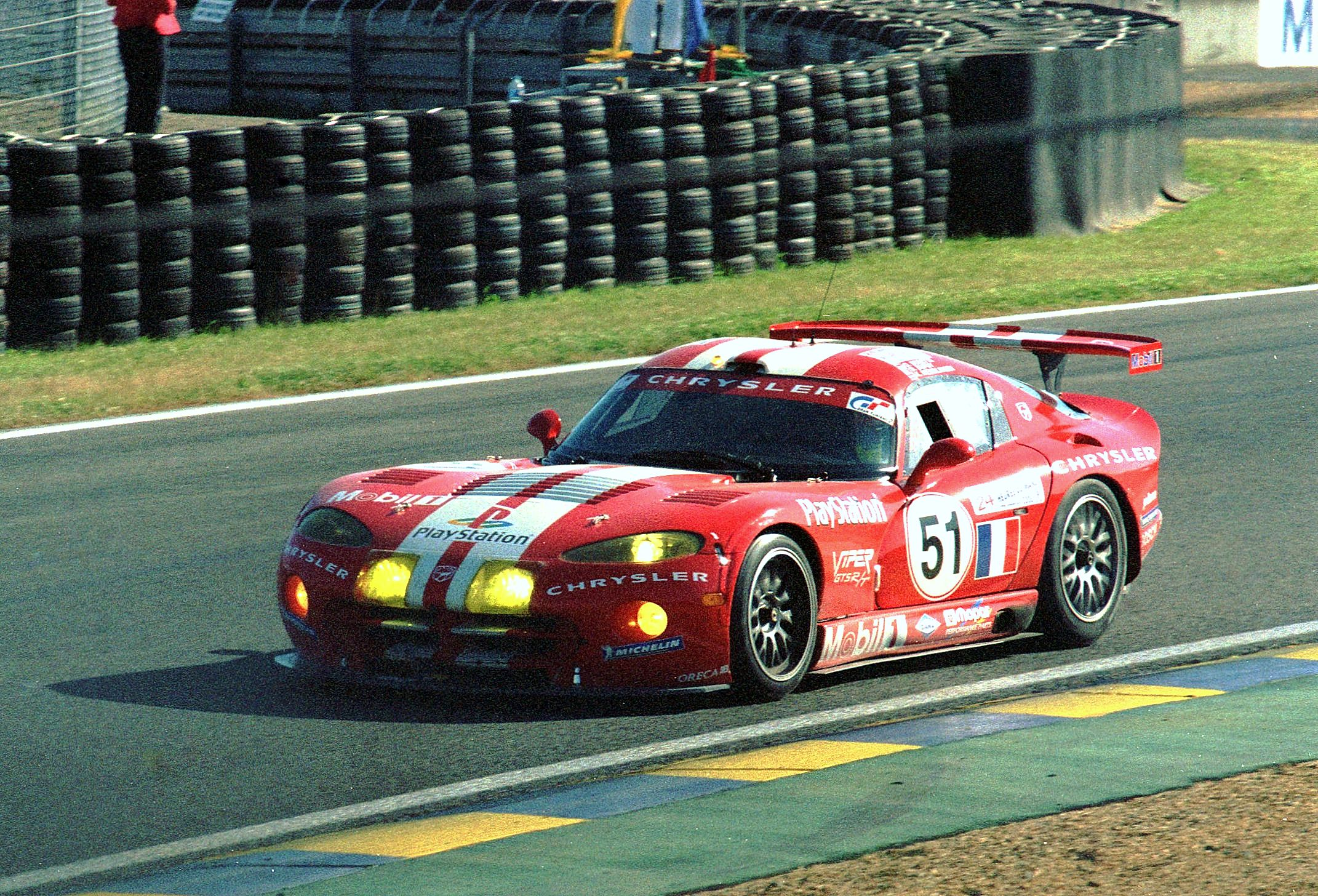
- Dupuy for Viper Team Oreca in 2000.
- Nationality: (France) French
- Born: 26 August 1957 (age 69) Ars, Charente, France

24 Hours of Le Mans career
- Years: 1993–1997, 1999–2000, 2003
- Teams: Monaco Media International, Larbre Compétition, Viper Team Oreca, Scorp Motorsport Communication
- Best finish: 7th (2000)
- Class wins: 4 (1993, 1994, 1999, 2000)

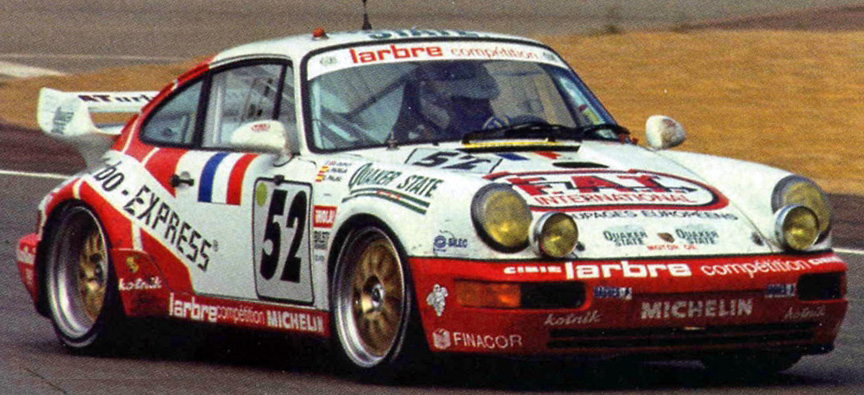
Dupuy's 1994 Le Mans GT1 class-winning Larbre Porsche.

Dominique Dupuy (born 26 August 1957) is a French racing driver.

== Career ==
Dupuy began racing professionally in 1983 in Championnat de France Formule Renault Turbo, finishing fourth. He moved to the French Formula Three Championship the following year and raced there until 1988. After that, he moved to the professional French Porsche 944 Cup series and moved to the French Porsche Carrera Cup in 1991, where he would race until 1999. He won the series championship five times ( record ) in 1993, 1994, 1997, 1998 and 1999, with 40 wins (record) and would move onto the Porsche Supercup in 1995, winning third place honors in Supercup in 1997. He also won two times (1993–1994) 24 Hours of Le Mans in GT class with Porsche. Racing in a double program for 1999, he won the French Porsche Carrera Cup and finished fifth to the FIA GT World Championship with only three participations over 12 races. After that, he moved to the French GT Championship, where he signed on to drive a Chrysler Viper GTS-R, and won the championship two times (2000–2001). He also raced with this Viper in Spanish championship, where he finished as the vice-champion. Prior to the season beginning, Dupuy and his Oreca teammates Olivier Beretta and Karl Wendlinger were the surprise overall winners of the 24 Hours of Daytona in their Viper.

Dupuy and the Oreca team were also the GTS champions of the 24 Hours of Le Mans in both 1999 and 2000. He also won the 12 Hours of Sebring and Adelaide (2000). Dupuy and his teammate François Fiat would go on to win the French GT Championship that year and repeated the feat in 2001. He brought the first Saleen S7R in France in 2003 until 2005. He retired from full-time competition in 2005 after and has not driven in French GT since 2007. He is now technical director of the First Racing team with 2 Lamborghini Gallardo in FFSA GT3.

== Racing record ==
=== 24 Hours of Le Mans results ===
Year	Team	Co-Drivers	Car	Class	Laps	Pos.	Class Pos.
1993	(France) Monaco Media International (France) Larbre Compétition	(France) Joël Gouhier (Germany) Jürgen Barth	Porsche 911 Carrera RSR	GT	304	15th	1st
1994	(France) Larbre Compétition	(Spain) Jesús Pareja (Spain) Carlos Palau	Porsche 911 Carrera RSR	GT1	307	8th	1st
1995	(France) Larbre Compétition	(France) Emmanuel Collard (Monaco) Stéphane Ortelli	Porsche 911 GT2 Evo	GT1	82	DNF	DNF
1996	(France) Viper Team Oreca	(United Kingdom) Perry McCarthy (United Kingdom) Justin Bell	Chrysler Viper GTS-R	GT1	96	DNF	DNF
1997	(France) Viper Team Oreca	(France) Philippe Gache (Monaco) Olivier Beretta	Chrysler Viper GTS-R	GT2	263	DNF	DNF
1999	(France) Viper Team Oreca	(Austria) Karl Wendlinger (Monaco) Olivier Beretta	Chrysler Viper GTS-R	GTS	325	10th	1st
2000	(France) Viper Team Oreca	(Austria) Karl Wendlinger (Monaco) Olivier Beretta	Chrysler Viper GTS-R	GTS	333	7th	1st
2003	(France) Scorp Motorsport Communication	(France) Luis Marques (France) Olivier Thévenin	Chrysler Viper GTS-R	GTS	229	DNF	DNF

Sporting positions
Preceded by Jean-Pierre Malcher	Porsche Carrera Cup France Champion; 1992-1993	Succeeded by Christophe Bouchut
Preceded by Christophe Bouchut	Porsche Carrera Cup France Champion; 1997-1999	Succeeded by Christophe Bouchut
