= Olivier Thévenin =

French racing driver (born 1968)

Olivier Thévenin (born 25 February 1968 in Orléans) is a retired French racing driver.

== 24 Hours of Le Mans results ==
Year	Team	Co-drivers	Car	Class	Laps	Pos.	Class pos.
1995	(France) Pilot Aldix Racing	(France) Michel Ferté (Spain) Carlos Palau	Ferrari F40 LM	GT1	271	12th	6th
1996	(France) Pilot Pen	(France) Michel Ferté (France) Nicolas Leboissetier	Ferrari F40 LM	GT1	93	DNF	DNF
1997	(France) Société JB Jabouille Bouresche	(France) Nicolas Leboissetier (Germany) Jürgen von Gartzen	Porsche 911 GT1	GT1	236	DNF	DNF
1998	(France) Courage Compétition	(France) Franck Fréon (Japan) Yojiro Terada	Courage C41-Porsche	LMP1	304	15th	4th
1999	(France) Riley & Scott Europe	(South Africa) Gary Formato (France) Philippe Gache	Riley & Scott Mk III/2-Ford	LMP	25	DNF	DNF
2002	(France) Luc Alphand Adventures	(France) Luc Alphand (France) Christian Lavieille	Porsche 911 GT3-RS	GT	299	24th	5th
2003	(France) Scorp Motorsport Communication	(France) Dominique Dupuy (France) Luis Marques	Chrysler Viper GTS-R	GTS	229	DNF	DNF
