= Franck Fréon =

French racing driver

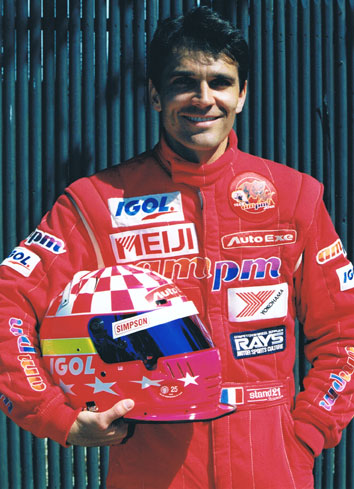
- Franck Fréon at Indianapolis Speedway in 1995
- Nationality: (France) French
- Born: 16 March 1962 (age 64) Paris (France)

Previous series
- 1986-87 1988 1989 1990 1991-93 1994-95 1995-97 1996: French Formula Renault Turbo; German Formula 3 French Formula 3 International Formula 3000; Indy Lights; CART/Indycars; IMSA GT Championship; Japanese Formula 3

Franck Fréon (born 16 March 1962, in Paris) is a French race car driver. Fréon won the 1996 24 Hours of Le Mans in the LMP2 class with Mazda, and the overall 2001 24 Hours of Daytona with Corvette.

Fréon began his career in the French Renault 5 Turbo Championship in 1986 and 1987 then competed in French Formula Three from 1988 to 1989. In 1990, he competed in International Formula 3000 and failed to qualify for four of his first five race attempts, but was credited with fifth place in his first successful start although he did not finish the race. He subsequently left his team and joined another for the final two races of the year where he qualified but failed to point. His fifth place was good enough for 19th in the championship.

Fréon moved to the United States and participated in Indy Lights from 1991 to 1993 capturing four wins and finishing runner up in both the 1992 and 1993 standings, behind Robbie Buhl and Bryan Herta respectively. However, he had trouble finding a good team in CART, making four starts (and one DNF) for three different teams in the 1994 season with a best finish of 12th in his CART debut at the Long Beach Grand Prix. 1995 wasn't much better as Fréon finished 15th in the Long Beach season opener, then failed to qualify for the Indianapolis 500 in a three year old Lola chassis and returned five months later only to fail to make the show at Laguna Seca Raceway.

Fréon then ventured into endurance car racing, driving marginally competitive LMP vehicles in the 24 Hours of Le Mans from 1995 to 1999. He then signed onto the Chevrolet factory team to drive the Chevrolet Corvette C5-R. He teamed with Ron Fellows and Johnny O'Connell to win the 24 Hours of Daytona in 2001. He continued with the team until 2004.

Nearing his retirement, Fréon leveraged his knowledge, experience and passion for cars to establish his business Pumpkin Fine Cars & Exotics in 1998.

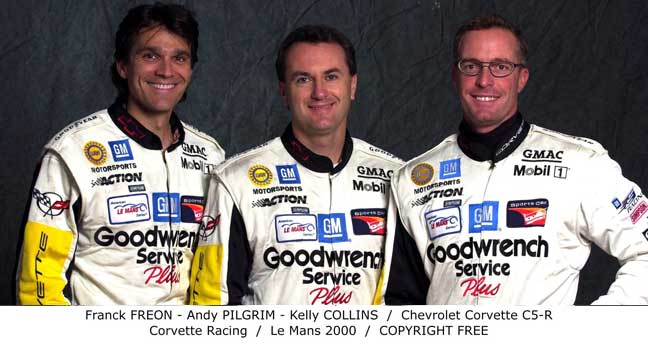
Franck Fréon with teammates Andy Pilgrim and Kelly Collins in Le Mans 2000

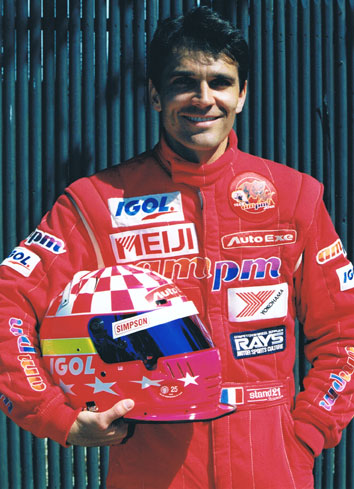
Franck Fréon at Indianapolis Speedway in 1995

== Career Results ==
=== Complete International Formula 3000 results ===
(key) (Races in bold indicate pole position; races in italics indicate fastest lap.)

Year	Entrant	1	2	3	4	5	6	7	8	9	10	11	DC	Points
1990	Galaxy Racing	DON; DNQ	SIL; DNQ	PAU; 5	JER; DNQ	MNZ; DNQ	PER	HOC	BRH	BIR			19th	2
1990	Apomatox										BUG; 14	NOG; 16	19th	2

=== Indy Lights ===
Year	Team	1	2	3	4	5	6	7	8	9	10	11	12	Rank	Points	Ref
1991	Fréon Racing Services	LBH; 4	PHX; 7	MIL; 3	DET; 2	POR; 2	CLE; 6	MEA; 6	TOR; 4	DEN; 6	MDO; 3	NAZ; 9	LS; 8	**4th**	**121**	
1992	Landford Racing	**PHX**; **11**	**LBH**; **1**	DET; 5	**POR**; **1**	MIL; 4	LOU; 2	TOR; 12	CLE; 1	VAN; 4	MDO; 6	NAZ; 2	LS; 3	**2nd**	**159**	
1993	John Martin Racing	PHX; 9	**LBH**; **2**	DET; 18	POR; 4	MIL; 1	NHA; 3	TOR; 2	CLE; 7	VAN; 5	MDO; 6	NAZ; 3	LS; 17	**2nd**	**122**	

=== CART ===
Year	Team	1	2	3	4	5	6	7	8	9	10	11	12	13	14	15	16	17	Rank	Points	Ref
1994	Project Indy	SRF	PHX	LBH; 12	INDY	MIL	DET	POR; 15	CLE	TOR	MIS	MDO	NHM						32nd	1	
1994	Euromotorsport													VAN; DNQ	ROA; 29	NZR			32nd	1	
1994	Indy Regency Racing																LS; 18		32nd	1	
1995	Project Indy	MIA	SRF	PHX	LBH; 15	NZR													36th	0	
1995	Indy Regency Racing						INDY; DNQ	MIL	DET	POR	ROA	TOR	CLE	MIS	MDO	NHM	VAN		36th	0	
1995	Payton/Coyne Racing																	LS; DNQ	36th	0	

=== 24 Hours of Le Mans ===
Year	Team	Co-Drivers	Car	Class	Laps	Pos.	Class Pos.
1994	(Japan) Team Artnature	(Japan) Yojiro Terada (France) Pierre de Thoisy	Mazda RX-7 GTO	IMSA; GTS	250	15th	**2nd**
1995	(United States) D.T.R. (Japan) Mazdaspeed Co. Ltd.	(Japan) Yojiro Terada (United States) Jim Downing	Kudzu DG-3-Mazda	WSC	282	7th	**3rd**
1996	(Japan) Mazdaspeed Co. Ltd.	(Japan) Yojiro Terada (United States) Jim Downing	Kudzu DLM-Mazda	LMP2	251	25th	**1st**
1997	(United States) Team T.D.R. (Japan) Mazdaspeed	(Japan) Yojiro Terada (United States) Jim Downing	Kudzu DLM-4-Mazda	LMP	263	17th	6th
1998	(France) Courage Compétition	(Japan) Yojiro Terada (France) Olivier Thévenin	Courage C41-Porsche	LMP1	300	16th	4th
1999	(Japan) Autoexe Motorsport	(Japan) Yojiro Terada (United Kingdom) Robin Donovan	Autoexe LMP99-Ford	LMP	74	DNF	DNF
2000	(United States) Corvette Racing	(United States) Andy Pilgrim (United States) Kelly Collins	Chevrolet Corvette C5-R	GTS	327	10th	**3rd**
2001	(United States) Corvette Racing	(United States) Andy Pilgrim (United States) Kelly Collins	Chevrolet Corvette C5-R	GTS	271	14th	**2nd**
2002	(United States) Corvette Racing	(United Kingdom) Andy Pilgrim (United States) Kelly Collins	Chevrolet Corvette C5-R	GTS	331	13th	**2nd**
2003	(United States) Corvette Racing	(Canada) Ron Fellows (United States) Johnny O'Connell	Chevrolet Corvette C5-R	GTS	326	12th	**3rd**
