= Steve Robertson (racing driver) =

British racing driver (born 1964)

- Nationality: (United Kingdom) British
- Born: 4 July 1964 (age 62) Hackney, London, England

British Touring Car Championship
- Years active: 1996
- Teams: Team Mondeo
- Starts: 23
- Wins: 0
- Poles: 0
- Fastest laps: 0
- Best finish: 20th in 1996

Championship titles
- 1994: Indy Lights

Stephen Robertson (born 4 July 1964) is a British former racing driver and race engineer. His father, David Robertson, was also a manager.

== Career ==
After spending three years in British Formula Three (which included a third place championship finish in 1990) and competing in a full season of International Formula 3000 in 1992 in which he failed to score points, Robertson won the 1993 Indy Lights Rookie of the Year award. This was followed by the 1994 Indy Lights championship (both with Tasman Motorsports). He captured seven wins during his two years in the series. He is one of only three Indy Lights champions to never race in Champ Car/IndyCar, the others being 1996 champion David Empringham and 2010 champion Jean-Karl Vernay.

Robertson later raced in the British Touring Car Championship (BTCC) in 1996, in a works Ford Mondeo. However, the car was not competitive and he finished 20th in the championship with only two points. In the first race of the season at Donington Park, he spun in front of his teammate Paul Radisich, and Radisich was unable to avoid colliding with him.

After racing, Robertson went on, along with his father Dave, to manage young drivers. After leading Jenson Button to Formula One, the pair took on Kimi Räikkönen. Räikkönen would later make a big jump, from Formula Renault in the UK through to F1 with the Sauber team, the following year. Robertson continued to manage Räikkönen throughout his career.

In November 2004, Räikkönen and Robertson formed a racing team for the British F3 International Series (as it is now called), Räikkönen Robertson Racing. In their second season with the help of Senna's F1 Engineer James Robinson (2006), "Double R" won the main Championship Class, with Brit Mike Conway.

== Racing record ==
=== Complete British Touring Car Championship results ===
(key) (Races in bold indicate pole position - 1 point awarded all races) (Races in italics indicate fastest lap)

Year	Team	Car	1	2	3	4	5	6	7	8	9	10	11	12	13	14	15	16	17	18	19	20	21	22	23	24	25	26	Pos	Pts
1996	Valvoline Team Mondeo	Ford Mondeo	DON; 1 Ret	DON; 2 DNS	BRH; 1; 12	BRH; 2; 12	THR; 1 Ret	THR; 2 Ret	SIL; 1 Ret	SIL; 2; 13	OUL; 1; 10	OUL; 2; 13	SNE; 1; 13	SNE; 2; 10	BRH; 1; 12	BRH; 2; 17	SIL; 1 Ret	SIL; 2; 12	KNO; 1; 12	KNO; 2; 12	OUL; 1 Ret	OUL; 2; 12	THR; 1 Ret	THR; 2; 14	DON; 1; 16	DON; 2; 17	BRH; 1 DNS	BRH; 2 DNS	**20th**	**2**

Sporting positions
Preceded by Bryan Herta	Indy Lights Champion; 1994	Succeeded by Greg Moore
