= Pedro Chaves =

Portuguese racing driver (born 1965)

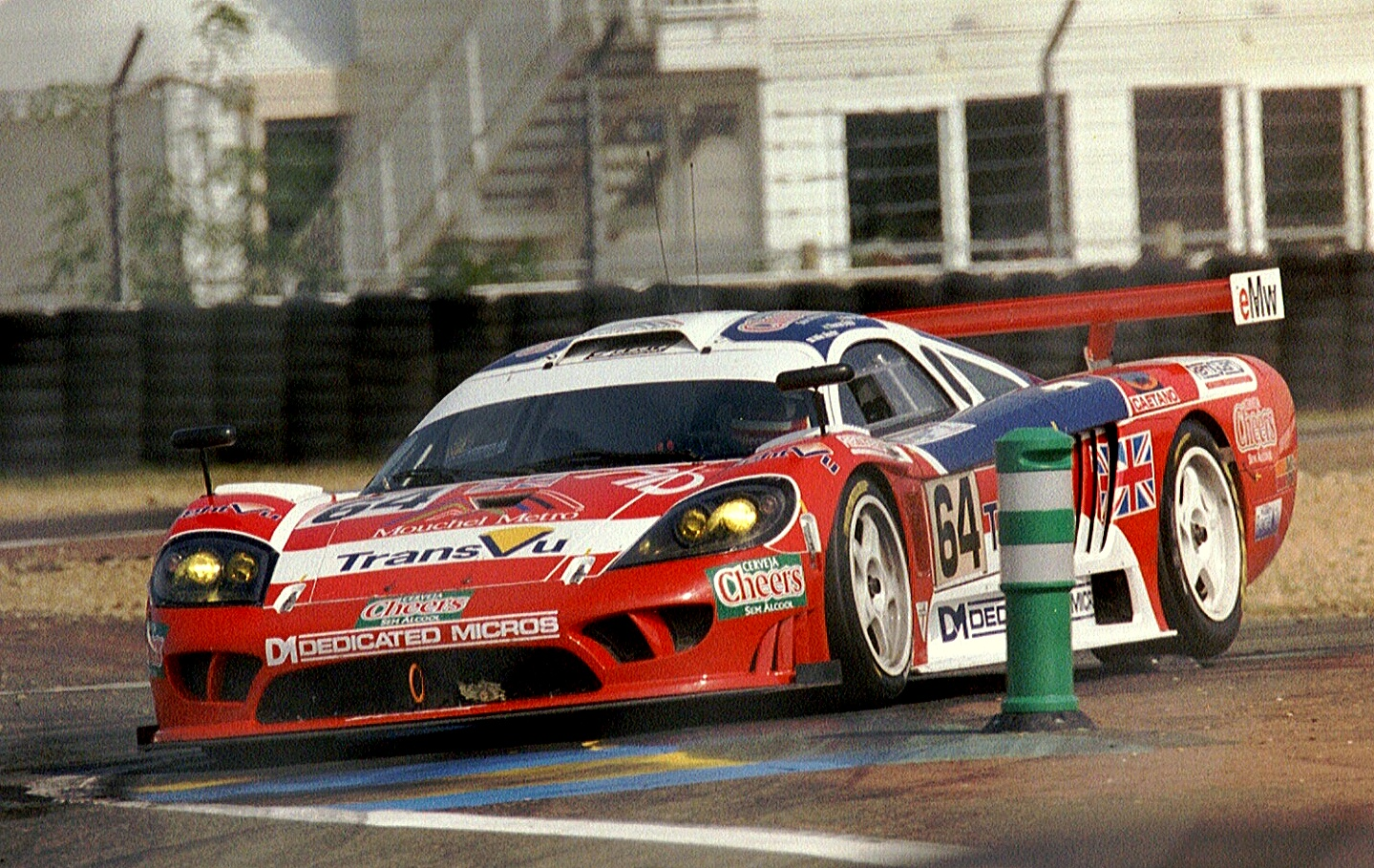
- Born: Pedro António Matos Chaves; 27 February 1965 (age 61); Porto, Portugal

Formula One World Championship career
- Nationality: (Portugal) Portuguese
- Active years: 1991
- Team: Coloni
- Entries: 13 (0 starts)
- Championships: 0
- Wins: 0
- Podiums: 0
- Career points: 0
- Pole positions: 0
- Fastest laps: 0
- First entry: 1991 United States Grand Prix
- Last entry: 1991 Portuguese Grand Prix

Pedro António Matos Chaves (Portuguese pronunciation: [ˈpeðɾu ˈmatuʃ ˈʃavɨʃ]; born 27 February 1965) is a Portuguese racing driver.

== Career ==
Chaves was the second Portuguese Formula Ford Champion, in 1986, starting an international career in 1987 in the British Formula Ford Championship. In 1990 he won the British F3000 Championship with the Madgwick Motorsport outfit, also racing in a few rounds of the FIA F3000 series.

In 1991, Chaves competed in Formula One with the underfunded and uncompetitive Coloni team, failing to pre-qualify for the first 13 Grands Prix of the season. Following the Portuguese Grand Prix, a dispute with the team over contractual and financial matters arose at the Spanish Grand Prix, where Chaves refused to drive and did not participate in pre-qualifying. He subsequently left the team, taking the remainder of his sponsorship funding with him.

At the end of that year, Chaves had an agreement with Leyton House (which would be renamed to March F1) to compete in 1992, however the sponsorship money came too late, and Karl Wendlinger took the place.

In 1992, Chaves returned to F3000, first with GJ Racing and later in the season moving to the more competitive Il Barone Rampante, with no results. Chaves then spent three years in the American Indy Lights series with Brian Stewart Racing, winning one race, in Vancouver in 1995. Chaves and Robbie Buhl were the only drivers to win that season other than Greg Moore, who won the rest of the events. In 1996, he moved to touring car racing and was second in the Spanish Touring Car Championship in a BMW, before racing a Porsche in the FIA GT Championship.

Chaves moved to the Portuguese Rally Championship in 1998, winning the title in 1999 and 2000, with his co-driver Sérgio Paiva, in a works-supported Toyota Corolla WRC. In 2001, he took the Spanish GT Championship title, in a Saleen S7-R co-driven by Miguel Ramos. He has also gone back to drive in the 24 Hours of Le Mans and the FIA GT Championship, for Graham Nash Motorsport.

In 2005 and 2006, Chaves returned to the Portuguese Rally Championship to drive a works Renault Clio S1600.

Chaves has since retired from racing and in 2006 became driver coach to A1 Team Lebanon. In 2008, he took over managerial duties in A1 Team Portugal. He is also managing the career of his son David.

== Racing record ==
=== Complete International Formula 3000 results ===
(key) (Races in bold indicate pole position; races in italics indicate fastest lap.)

Year	Entrant	Chassis	Engine	1	2	3	4	5	6	7	8	9	10	11	Pos.	Pts
1989	Cobra Motorsports	Reynard 88D	Cosworth	SIL; 15	VAL; DNQ	PAU; DNQ	JER; Ret	PER; Ret	BRH; 11	BIR; Ret	SPA; DNQ	BUG; 17	DIJ; DNQ		NC	0
1990	Madgwick Motorsport GB	Reynard 90D	Cosworth	DON	SIL	PAU	JER	MNZ	PER	HOC	BRH; 4	BIR; Ret	BUG; DNQ	NOG; 14	16th	3
1992	GJ Motorsports	Lola T92/50	Mugen Honda	SIL; Ret	PAU; 9	CAT; Ret	PER; 7	HOC; 13	NÜR; 13						NC	0
1992	Il Barone Rampante	Reynard 92D	Cosworth							SPA; DNQ	ALB; 11	NOG; 10	MAG; Ret		NC	0

=== Complete British Formula 3000 Championship results ===
(key) (Races in bold indicate pole position; races in italics indicate fastest lap.)

Year	Entrant	Chassis	Engine	1	2	3	4	5	6	7	8	9	10	Pos.	Pts
1990	Madgwick Motorsport GB	Reynard 90D	Cosworth	BHI; 4	OUL; 3	**THR**; 1	SNE; 2	**BHI**; 1	**BHI**; Ret	OUL; 3	BGP; 1	**SIL**; 1	DON; 1	1st	62

=== Complete Formula One results ===
(key) (Races in bold indicate pole position; races in italics indicate fastest lap)

Year	Entrant	Chassis	Engine	1	2	3	4	5	6	7	8	9	10	11	12	13	14	15	16	WDC	Pts
1991	Coloni Racing Srl	Coloni C4	Ford Cosworth DFR 3.5 V8	USA; DNPQ	BRA; DNPQ	SMR; DNPQ	MON; DNPQ	CAN; DNPQ	MEX; DNPQ	FRA; DNPQ	GBR; DNPQ	GER; DNPQ	HUN; DNPQ	BEL; DNPQ	ITA; DNPQ	POR; DNPQ	ESP	JPN	AUS	NC	0

=== 24 Hours of Le Mans results ===
Year	Team	Co-Drivers	Car	Class	Laps	Pos.	Class Pos.
2002	(United Kingdom) Ray Mallock Ltd.	(Portugal) Miguel Ramos (United Kingdom) Gavin Pickering	Saleen S7-R	GTS	312	23rd	5th
2003	(United Kingdom) Graham Nash Motorsport (United Kingdom) Ray Mallock Ltd.	(Brazil) Thomas Erdos (United Kingdom) Mike Newton	Saleen S7-R	GTS	292	28th	6th

=== Complete Spanish Touring Car Championship results ===
(key) (Races in bold indicate pole position; races in italics indicate fastest lap.)

Year	Team	Car	1	2	3	4	5	6	7	8	9	10	11	12	13	14	15	16	DC	Pts
1996	Teo Martín Motorsport	BMW 320i	**JAR**; **1**; 3	JAR; 2; 4	ALB; 1; 5	ALB; 2; 10	BAR; 1 Ret	BAR; 2 Ret	EST; 1; 2	EST; 2; 1	CAL; 1 Ret	CAL; 2; 4	JER; 1; 1	JER; 2 Ret	JAR; 1; 1	JAR; 2; 1	BAR; 1; 3	BAR; 2; 3	**2nd**	**160**

=== Complete WRC results ===
Year	Entrant	Car	1	2	3	4	5	6	7	8	9	10	11	12	13	14	Pos	Points
1993	Pedro Matos	Renault 5 GT Turbo	MON	SWE	POR; Ret	KEN	FRA	GRC	ARG	NZL	FIN	AUS	ITA	ESP	GBR		NC	0
1998	Telecel Castrol Team	Toyota Corolla WRC	MON	SWE	KEN	POR; 13	ESP	FRA	ARG	GRC	NZL	FIN	ITA	AUS	GBR		NC	0
1999	Telecel Castrol Team	Toyota Corolla WRC	MON	SWE	KEN	POR; Ret	ESP	FRA	ARG	GRC	NZL	FIN	CHN	ITA	AUS	GBR	NC	0
2000	Telecel Castrol Team	Toyota Corolla WRC	MON	SWE	KEN	POR; Ret	ESP	ARG	GRC	NZL	FIN	CYP	FRA	ITA	AUS	GBR	NC	0
2001	Telecel / Vodafone Castrol Team	Toyota Corolla WRC	MON	SWE	POR; Ret	ESP	ARG	CYP	GRC	KEN	FIN	NZL	ITA	FRA	AUS	GBR	NC	0

=== Complete FIA GT Championship results ===
(key) (Races in bold indicate pole position) (Races in italics indicate fastest lap)

Year	Team	Class	Car	Engine	1	2	3	4	5	6	7	8	9	10	11	Pos.	Points
1997	Roock Racing	GT1	Porsche 911 GT1	Porsche 3.2 L Turbo Flat-6	HOC	SIL	HEL	NÜR; Ret	SPA; 7	A1R; 13						NC	0
1997	Roock Racing	GT2	Porsche 911 GT2	Porsche 3.6 L Turbo Flat-6							SUZ; 2	DON; 4	MUG; 3	SEB; Ret	LAG	11th	13
2003	Graham Nash Motorsport	GT	Saleen S7-R	Ford 6.9 L V8	BAR; Ret	MAG; 5	PER; 7	BRN; 7	DON; DNS	SPA; 5	AND; 10	OSC; 6	EST	MNZ		17th	15.5

Sporting positions
Preceded by Gary Brabham	British Formula 3000; Champion; 1990	Succeeded by Paul Warwick
Preceded by Alberto Castello; Carlos Palau	Spanish GT Championship; Champion; 2002; With: Miguel Ramos	Succeeded by Gines Vivancos
