= Carlos Palau =

Spanish racing driver

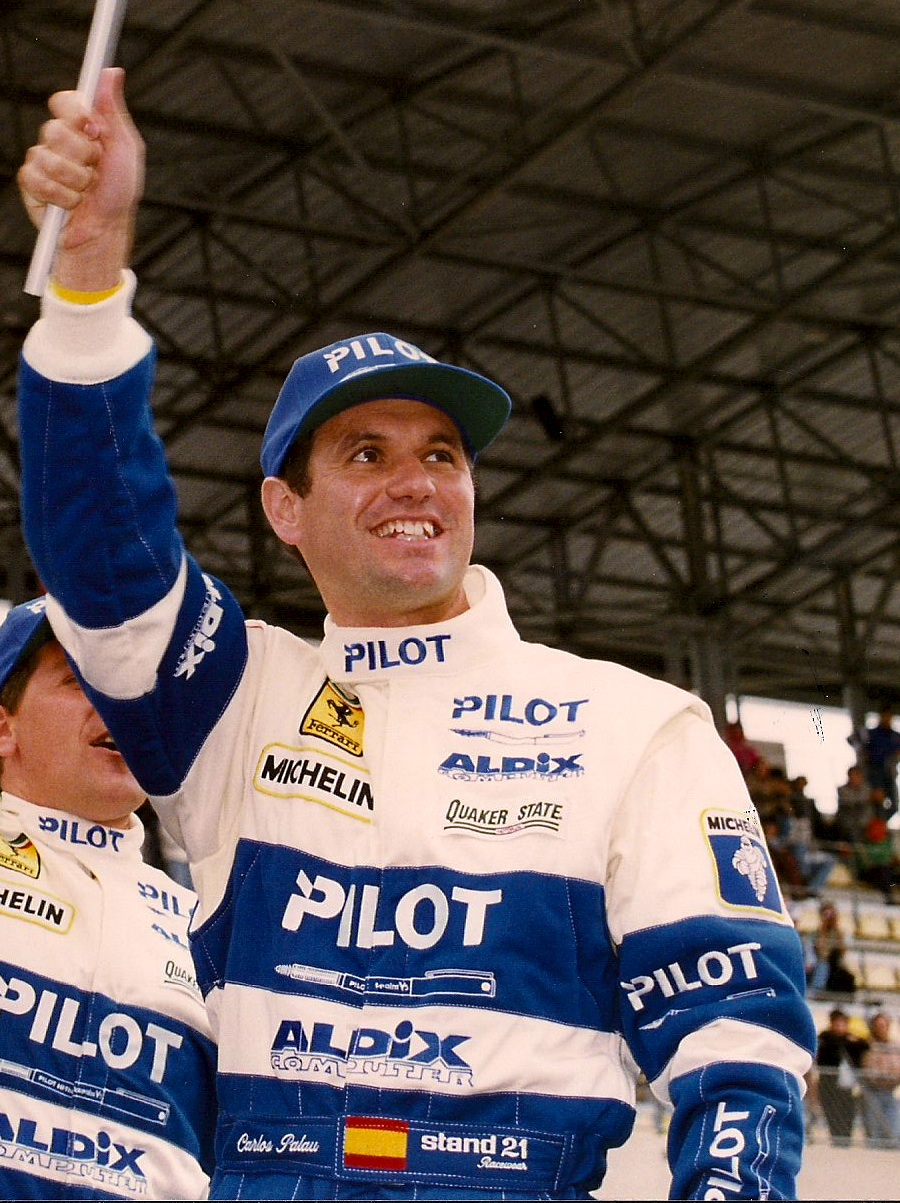
Carlos Palau. Le Mans 1995. Ferrari F40 LM

Carlos Palau Mallol (born March 4, 1959) is a Spanish former racing driver.

Palau started racing in motorbikes switching to cars in 1986 racing at Spanish Renault Turbo Cup. He had a long term relation with Ford, working in the development of the Mondeo 4x4 FIA II supertourer. He joined Ford UK team in 1994 FIA Supertouring World Championship at Donington.
He raced three times in 24 Hours of Le Mans winning GT Class in 1994 with Porsche.
In GT Class, he raced with big brands as Ferrari, Porsche, Lamborghini, Lister and Saleen.
With Saleen, he won the Spanish GT2 Championship in 1999 and Spanish GT Championship in 2001.

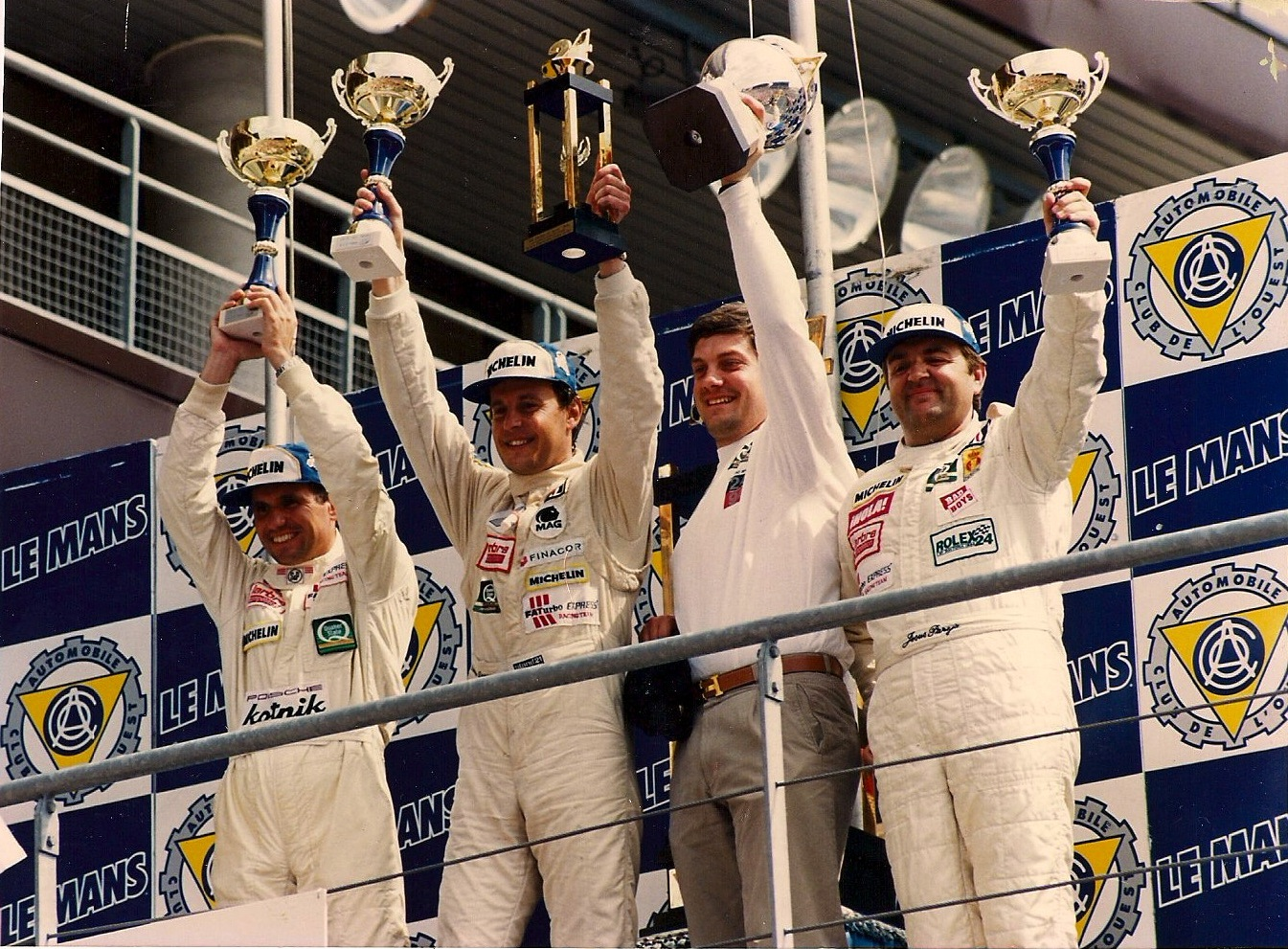
Carlos Palau. GT Winner 24 Hours of Le Mans 1994. Porsche 911 RSR.

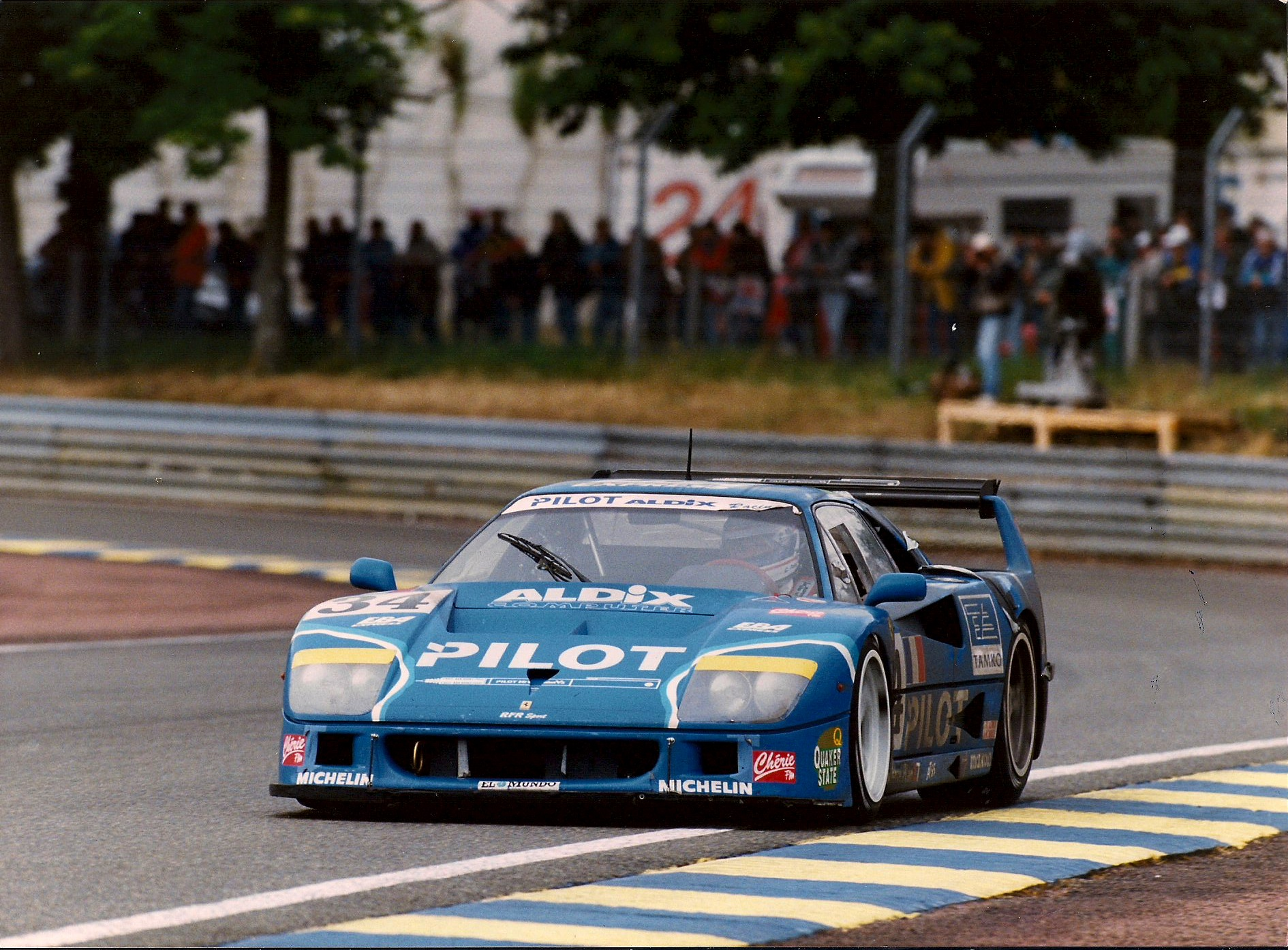
Carlos Palau. Ferrari F40LM. Le Mans 95

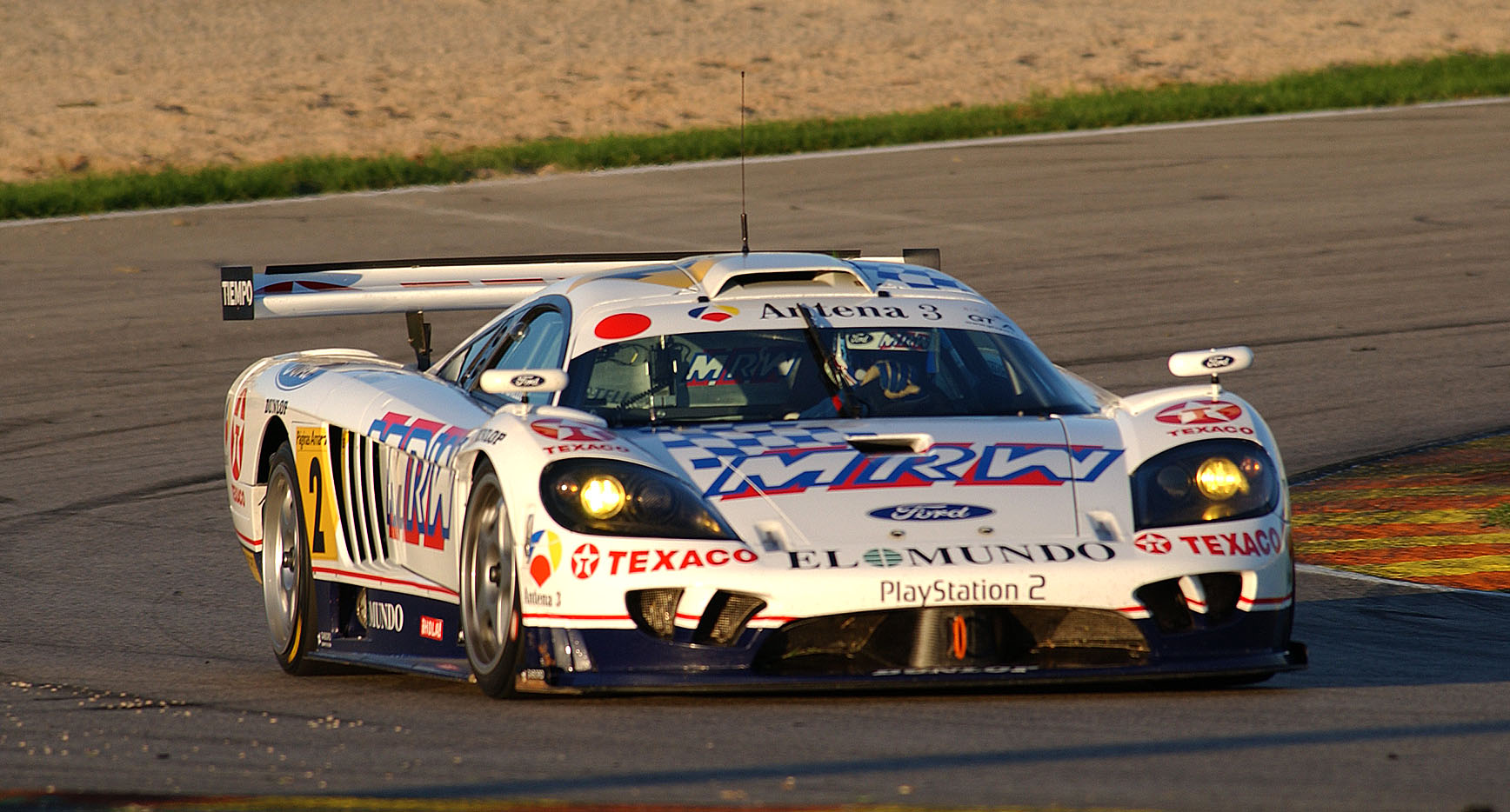
Carlos Palau. Saleen S7R. Spanish GT champion 2001

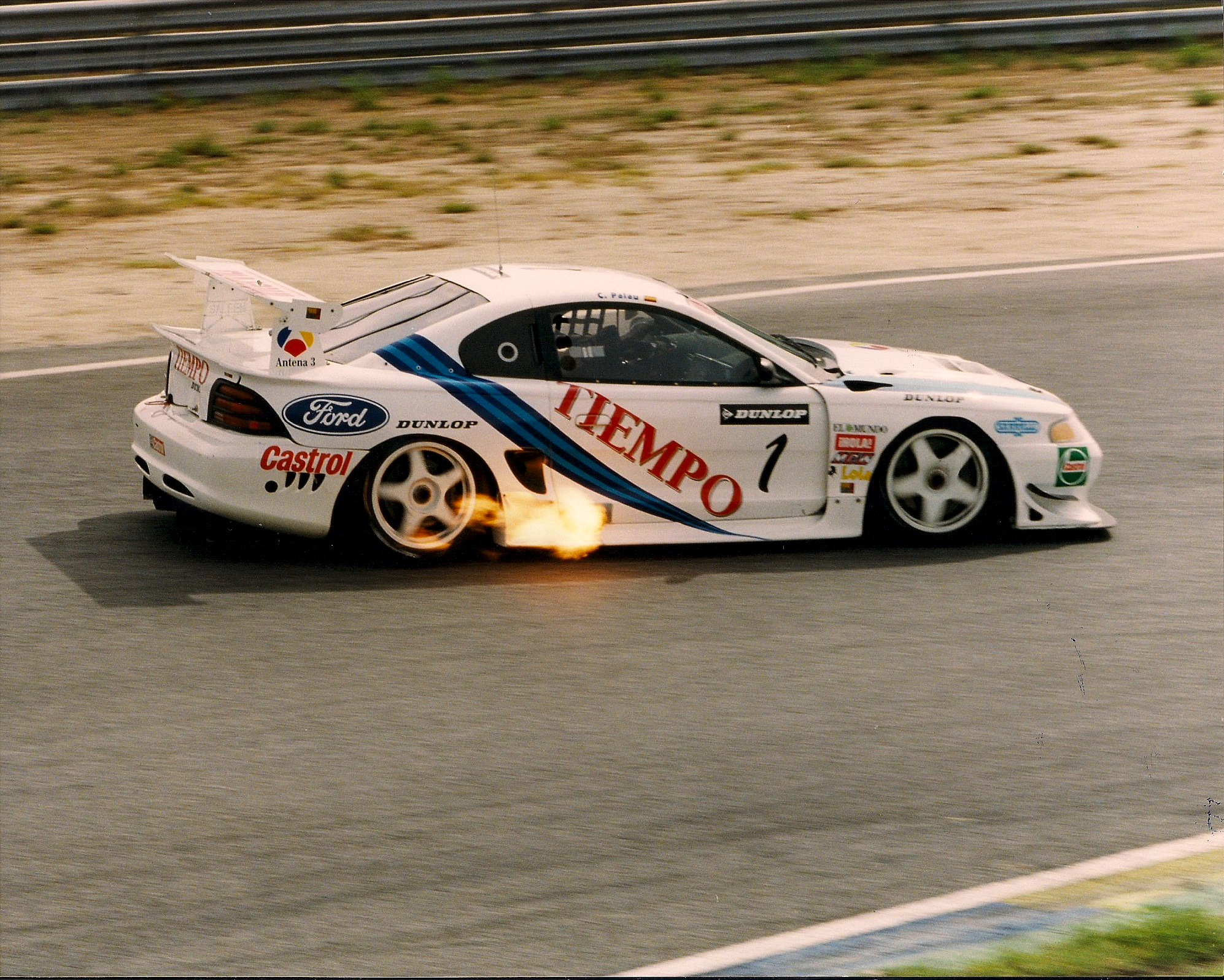
Carlos Palau. Saleen Mustang. Spanish GT2 Champion 1999

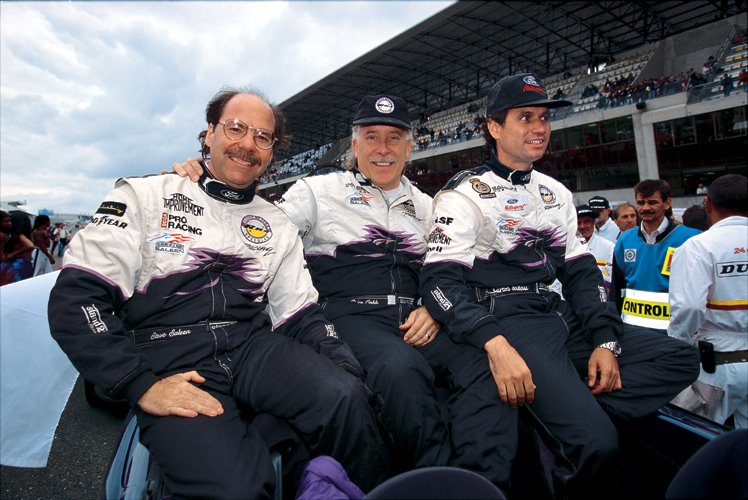
Carlos Palau with Steve Saleen and Price Cobb. 24 Hour of Le Mans 1997

== Racing highlights ==
- 24 Hour of Le Mans in 1994, 1995, 1997
- 1992 Spanish Touring Car Vice Champion
- 1993 Spanish Touring Car Championship − Third
- 1994 24 Hours of Le Mans GT2 Winner
- 1999 Spanish GT Championship GT2 Winner
- 2000 Spanish GT Championship Vice Champion
- 2001 Spanish GT Championship Winner, 24 Hours of Barcelona Winner

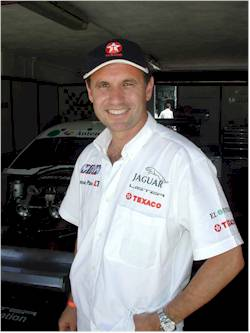
Carlos Palau. Spanish GT Vice Champion 2000.Lister Jaguar

== Racing results ==
=== 24 Hours of Le Mans results ===
Year	Team	Co-drivers	Car	Class	Laps	Pos.	Class pos.
1994	(France) Larbre Compétition	(France) Dominique Dupuy (Spain) Jesús Pareja	Porsche 911 Carrera RSR	GT2	308	8th	1st
1995	(France) Pilot Aldix Racing	(France) Michel Ferté (France) Olivier Thévenin	Ferrari F40 LM	GT1	270	12th	6th
1997	(United States) Saleen/Allen Speedlab	(United States) Price Cobb (United States) Steve Saleen	Saleen Mustang SR	GT2	133	DNF	DNF

== See also ==
- 1994 24 Hours of Le Mans
- Spanish GT Championship
