= Lee Bentham =

Canadian racing driver (born 1970)

- Nationality: Canada
- Born: July 27, 1970 (age 56) Richmond Hill, Ontario, Canada
- Retired: 1999

Toyota Atlantic Series
- Years active: 1995-1999
- Teams: P-1 Racing; Forsythe Championship Racing
- Starts: 43
- Wins: 3
- Poles: 4
- Best finish: 1st in 1998

Previous series
- 1997: Indy Lights

Championship titles
- 1998: Toyota Atlantic Series

Lee Bentham (born July 27, 1970) is a Canadian former racing driver from Richmond Hill, Ontario. In 1990 and 1992 he competed in the Formula K karting World Championship series.

Bentham moved to cars in the Toyota Atlantic series in 1995 in a successful partial-season program that managed to place Bentham on the podium twice and finished eighth in points. The following year Bentham captured seven podiums and was the series runner-up. In 1997, he competed for Forsythe Racing in the Indy Lights series, won on the oval at Gateway International Raceway and finished fifth in points.

1998 was Bentham's breakout year, as he captured three wins and seven podiums on his way to the Toyota Atlantic Championship for Forsythe Championship Racing. 1999 was his final year of top-level racing and was another year in Atlantics where he won a single race and finished sixth in points. Since 2012, Bentham has been the Driver Development Coach for Ed Carpenter Racing in the IndyCar series, having previously coached Josef Newgarden.In 2025 he was inducted into the Canadian Motorsports Hall of Fame.

== Motorsports career results ==
=== American open–wheel racing results ===
(key) (Races in bold indicate pole position) (Races in italics indicate fastest lap)

==== Atlantic Championship ====
Year	Team	1	2	3	4	5	6	7	8	9	10	11	12	13	Rank	Points
1995	P-1 Racing	MIA	PHX	LBH	NAZ	MIL	MTL; 5	TOR; 8	TRR1; 25	TRR2; 3	MDO; 2	VAN; 5	LAG; 4		**8th**	**72**
1996	P-1 Racing	**HMS**; 2	LBH; 6	NAZ; 3	MIL; 3	MTL; 3	TOR; 16	TRR1; 3	TRR2; 4	MDO; 4	ROA; 3	VAN; 2	LAG; 5		**2nd**	**149**
1998	Forsythe Racing	LBH; 19	NAZ; 6	GAT; 5	MIL; 2	**MTL**; 1	CLE; 5	**TOR**; 2	TRR; 3	MDO; 1	ROA; 19	VAN; 6	**LAG**; 2	HOU; 3	**1st**	**163**
1999	Forsythe Racing	LBH; 3	NAZ; 9	GAT; DNS	MIL; 1	MTL; 8	ROA; 8	TRR; 25	MDO; 18	CHI; 4	VAN; 24	LAG; 5	HOU; 13		**6th**	**71**

==== Indy Lights ====
Year	Team	1	2	3	4	5	6	7	8	9	10	11	12	13	Rank	Points	Ref
1997	Forsythe Racing	HMS; 5	LBH; 14	NAZ; 22	SAV; 3	STL; 1	MIL; 9	DET; 22	POR; 8	TOR; 27	TRO; 8	VAN; 8	LAG; 5	FON; 3	**5th**	**88**	

Sporting positions
Preceded by Alex Barron	Toyota Atlantic Champion; 1998	Succeeded by Anthony Lazzaro
