= Sérgio Paese =

Brazilian racing driver

- Nationality: (Brazil) Brazilian
- Born: December 15, 1975 (age 50) Curitiba, Paraná
- Retired: 2005

Stock Car Brasil
- Years active: 2003, 2005
- Teams: Salmini Racing; Greco Motorsport
- Starts: 12
- Wins: 0
- Poles: 0
- Fastest laps: 0
- Best finish: 22nd in 2003

Previous series
- 1997-1998 1996 1995-1996 1994-1995: Indy Lights; International Formula 3000; Formula 3 Sudamericana; Formula Chevrolet Brasil

Sérgio Paese (born 15 December 1975 in Curitiba) is a former racing driver who has competed in the 1996 International Formula 3000 season and subsequently raced in Indy Lights and Stock Car Brasil.

== Racing career ==
Paese competed in his first international auto race in the 1994 EFDA Nations Cup partnered with Tony Kanaan the team competed at Circuit Park Zandvoort. The team finished fifteenth out of eighteen teams. In 1995, Paese finished third in his domestic Formula Chevrolet championship before graduating into the Formula 3 Sudamericana. In a Honda powered Dallara F394, Paese won one race and classified third in the championship.

Paese joined Draco Racing for three rounds of the International Formula 3000 championship in 1996. At the Pau Grand Prix, he qualified 22nd and was the last driver allowed to compete. His debut did not last long as he was the first driver to retire. After he failed to qualify for the race at Pergusa, he returned at the Hockenheimring. After qualifying 21st Paese again was the first driver to retire.

For 1997, Paese moved into the Indy Lights. Paese missed his debut race at Homestead-Miami Speedway due to an illness but joined the field at Long Beach. In preparation of his Indy Lights season, Paese tested with FRE Racing at Roebling Road Raceway. He scored his best result of the season at the Hutchinson Island Road Race Course in Savannah, Georgia. At the track, Paese finished behind Hélio Castroneves. After struggling with technical difficulties, Paese qualified eighteenth in the championship. His 1998 season started strong with a pole position at the season opener at Homestead. During the race, Paese lost the lead to Naoki Hattori on lap four. On lap 29, Paese attempted to recapture the lead of the race but he crashed in the process. Paese again qualified on pole position at Milwaukee. During the race, he lost two places and eventually finished third. At Michigan International Speedway, Paese had an impressive run. He qualified nineteenth and eventually finished third. Paese was classified thirteenth in the championship.

After the 1998 season, Paese took a sabbatical from professional racing. He returned to full-time racing in the domestic Stock Car Brasil in 2003. The driver from Curitiba scored his best result at Autódromo Internacional Orlando Moura. After being disqualified from qualifying, he finished seventh. Paese eventually finished 22nd in the championship. He returned for one race in 2005. At Autódromo Internacional Nelson Piquet Paese finished sixteenth, just outside the points.

== Motorsports results ==
=== International Formula 3000 results ===
(key) (Races in bold indicate pole position) (Races in italics indicate fastest lap)

Year	Entrant	1	2	3	4	5	6	7	8	9	10	DC	Points
1996	Draco Engineering	NÜR	PAU; Ret	PER; DNQ	HOC; Ret	SIL	SPA	MAG	EST	MUG	HOC	N.C.	-

=== American open-wheel racing results ===
(key) (Races in bold indicate pole position) (Races in italics indicate fastest lap)

==== Indy Lights ====
Year	Team	1	2	3	4	5	6	7	8	9	10	11	12	13	14	Rank	Points	Ref
1997	FRE Racing	MIA; DNS	LBH; 33	NAZ	SAV; 2	STL; 18	MIL; 24	DET	POR; 12	TOR; 23	TRO; 25	VAN; 27	LS; 13	FON		**18th**	**27**	
1998	Brian Stewart Racing	**MIA**; 21	LBH; 6	NAZ; 20	STL; 10	**MIL**; 3	DET; 22	POR; 6	CLE; 18	TOR; 9	MIS; 3	TRO; 13	VAN	LS	FON; 26	**13th**	**53**	
