= 1994 Atlantic Championship =

1994 Toyota Atlantic Championship season
- Player's Toyota Atlantic Championship

Season
- Races: 11
- Start date: April 9th
- End date: October 8th

Awards
- Drivers' champion: (Canada) David Empringham

The 1994 Toyota Atlantic Championship season was contested over 11 rounds. The Player's Toyota Atlantic Championship Drivers' Champion was David Empringham.

Somes drivers, ike Mark Dismore, were no eligible for points.

== Races ==
Rnd	Race Name	Circuit	City/Location	Date	Pole position	Winning driver
1	(United States) 1994 Phoenix	Phoenix International Raceway	Phoenix, Arizona	April 9	(United States) Greg Ray	(United States) Greg Ray
2	(United States) 1994 Long Beach	Streets of Long Beach	Long Beach, California	April 17	(United States) Greg Ray	(United States) Richie Hearn
3	(Canada) 1994 Mosport	Mosport International Raceway	Bowmanville, Ontario	May 22	(United States) Greg Ray	(United States) Greg Ray
4	(United States) 1994 Milwaukee	Milwaukee Mile	West Allis, Wisconsin	June 4	(United States) Greg Ray	(United States) Greg Ray
5	(Canada) 1994 Montréal	Circuit Gilles Villeneuve	Montreal, Quebec	June 11	(United States) Richie Hearn	(United States) Richie Hearn
6	(Canada) 1994 Toronto	Exhibition Place	Toronto, Ontario	July 16	(Canada) David Empringham	(United States) Richie Hearn
7	(Canada) 1994 Trois-Rivières	Circuit Trois-Rivières	Trois-Rivières, Quebec	August 7	(Canada) David Empringham	(Canada) David Empringham
8	(United States) 1994 Mid-Ohio	Mid-Ohio Sports Car Course	Lexington, Ohio	August 14	(United States) Richie Hearn	(United States) Colin Trueman
9	(Canada) 1994 Vancouver	Streets of Vancouver	Vancouver, British Columbia	September 3	(United States) Richie Hearn	(Canada) David Empringham
10	(United States) 1994 Nazareth	Nazareth Speedway	Nazareth, Pennsylvania	September 17	(United States) Greg Ray	(United States) Mark Dismore
11	(United States) 1994 Laguna Seca	Mazda Raceway Laguna Seca	Monterey, California	October 8	(United States) Richie Hearn	(United States) Richie Hearn

Oval/Speedway
Road Course/Street Circuit

== Final driver standings (Top 12) ==
Pos	Driver	Pts
1	(Canada) David Empringham	162
2	(United States) Richie Hearn	160
3	(United States) Greg Ray	148
4	(United States) Colin Trueman	135
5	(United States) Bobby Carville	100
6	(United States) Peter Faucetta	83
7	(United States) David Myers	51
8	(Canada) Frank Allers	47
9	(Canada) Patrick Carpentier	40
10	(United States) Jim Ward	40
11	(United States) Clint Mears	35
12	(United Kingdom) Jeremy Cotterill	34

=== Final driver standings C2 Class (Top 3) ===
Pos	Driver	Pts
1	(Canada) Bernie Schuchmann	112
2	(Canada) Frank Allers	89
3	(United States) Jim Ward	81

== See also ==
- 1994 IndyCar season
- 1994 Indy Lights season
