= Didier André =

French race car driver

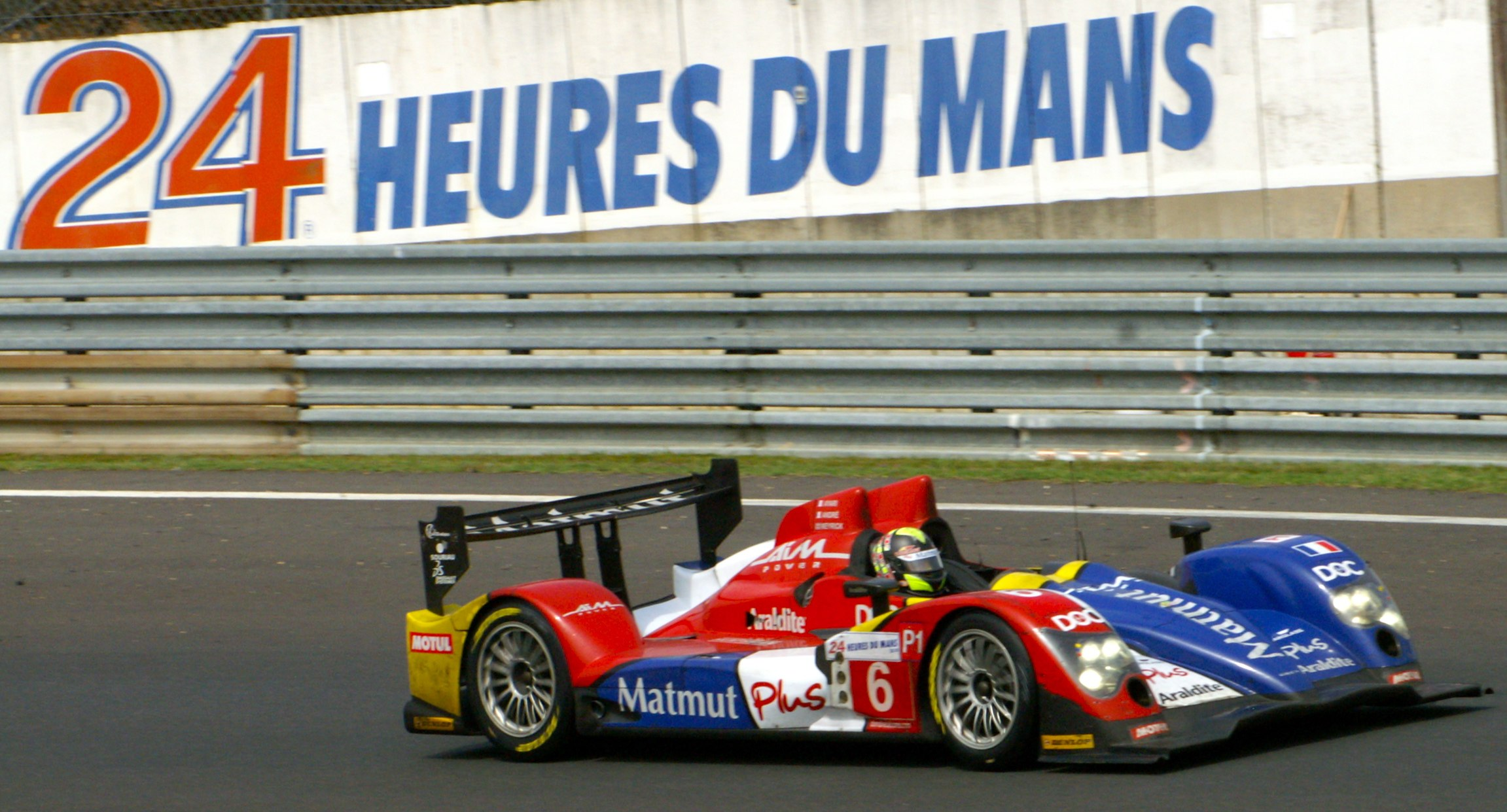
- André racing for Oreca in 2010.
- Nationality: (France) French
- Born: 3 September 1974 (age 52) Lyon, France
- Categorisation: FIA Gold (until 2012); FIA Silver (2013–2019); FIA Bronze (2025–)
24 Hours of Le Mans career
- Years: 2000, 2003 – 2007, 2009–2010
- Teams: Mopar Team Oreca, Noël del Bello Racing, Taurus Sports Racing, Paul Belmondo Racing, Luc Alphand Aventures, Signature Plus; AIM Team Oreca Matmut
- Best finish: 4th (2010)
- Class wins: 1 (2003)

Didier André (born 3 September 1974) is a race car driver born in Lyon, France. In the late 1990s, he competed in Indy Lights, driving in the Indy Racing League in 2001 and World Series by Nissan from 2003 to 2004. During 2006, he drove in the Le Mans Series Championship, initially in LMP2 for the team Paul Belmondo Racing n°37 car, a Courage C65 with Ford power. Subsequently, he moved to the LMP1 championship-winning Pescarolo Sport squad, where he won at Donington and Jarama, partnering Jean-Christophe Boullion and Emmanuel Collard.

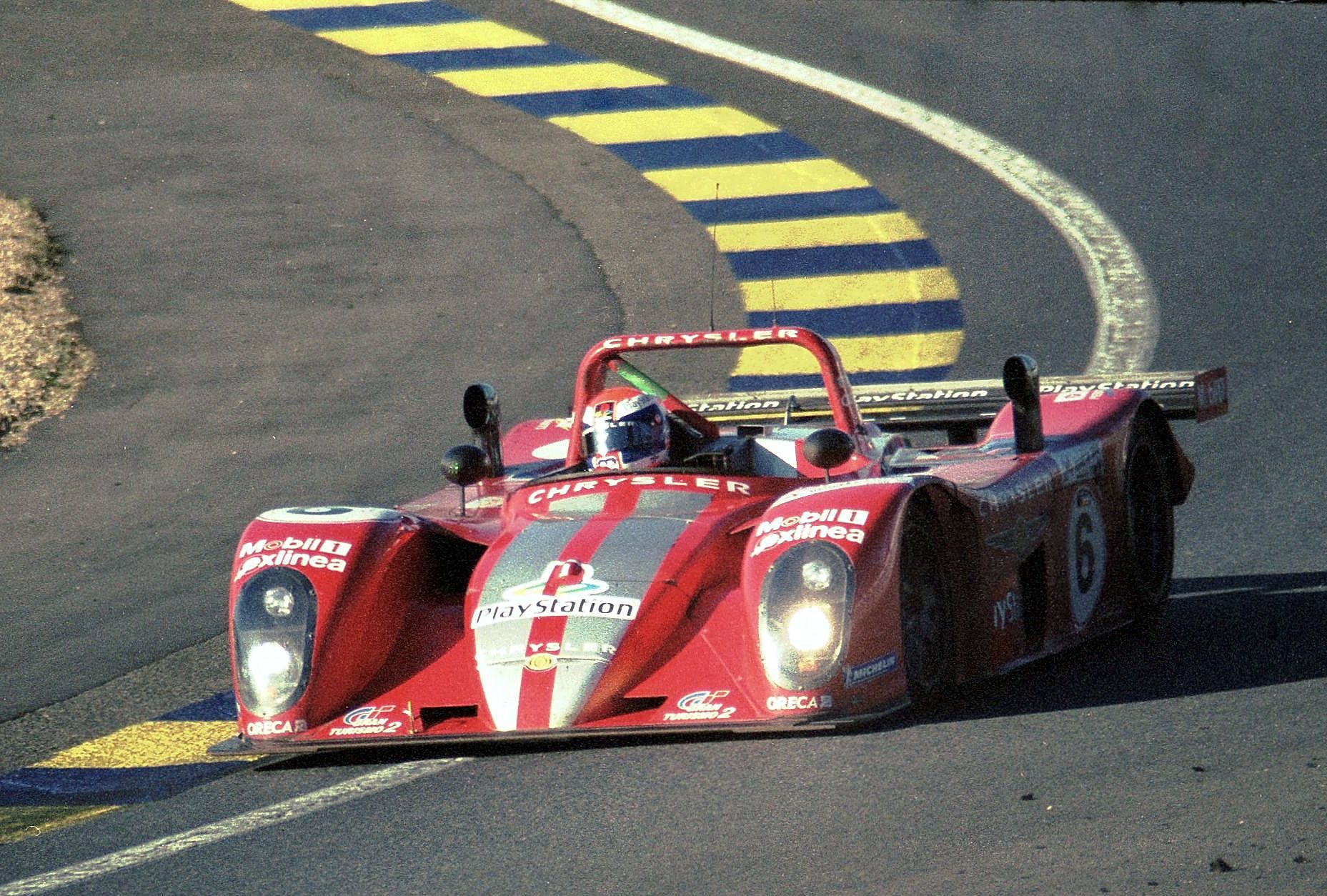
André made his Le Mans debut in the premier LMP900 category, in 2000.

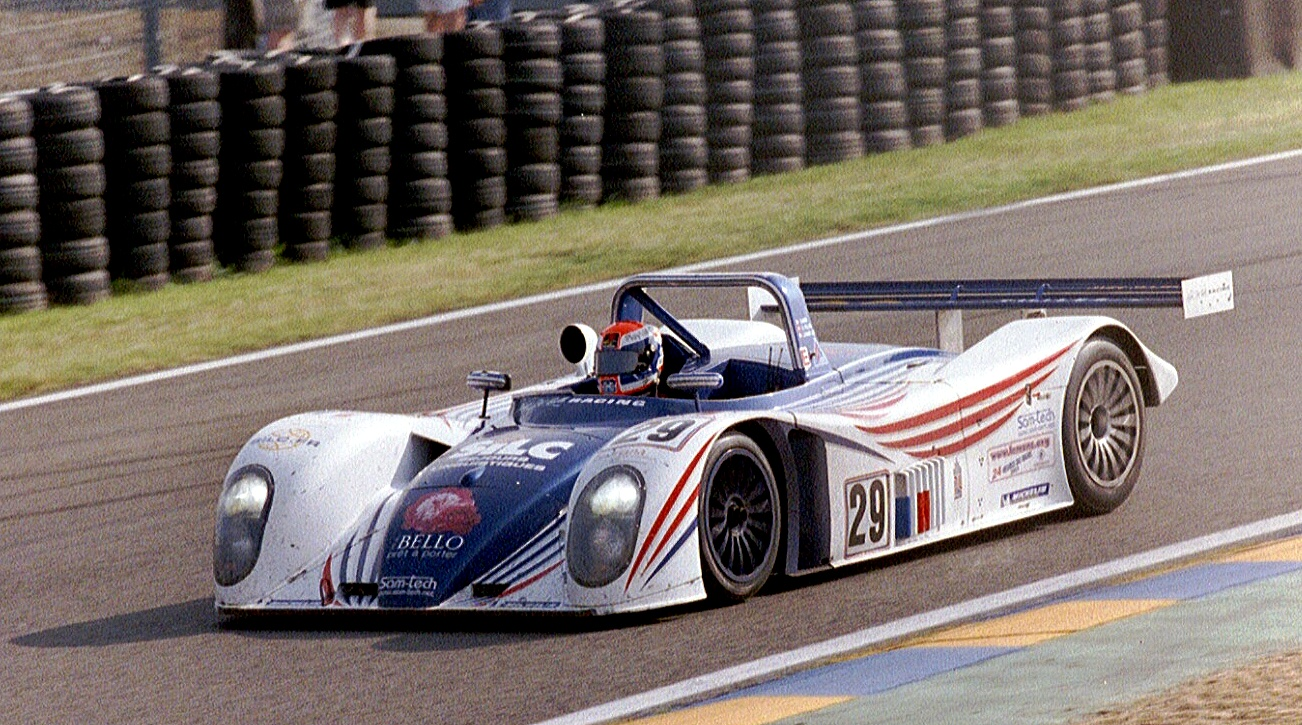
André's LMP675 class-winning Reynard in 2003.

== Racing record ==
=== 24 Hours of Le Mans results ===
Year	Team	Co-Drivers	Car	Class	Laps	Pos.	Class Pos.
2000	(France) Mopar Team Oreca	(Belgium) Didier Theys (Belgium) Jeffrey van Hooydonk	Reynard 2KQ-LM-Mopar	LMP900	292	20th	10th
2003	(France) Noël del Bello Racing	(France) Jean-Luc Maury-Laribière (Switzerland) Christophe Pillon	Reynard 2KQ-LM-Volkswagen	LMP675	319	15th	1st
2004	(United Kingdom) Taurus Sports Racing	(United Kingdom) Christian Vann (Switzerland) Benjamin Leuenberger	Lola B2K/10-Judd	LMP1	300	20th	8th
2005	(France) Paul Belmondo Racing	(France) Paul Belmondo (United States) Rick Sutherland	Courage C65-Ford	LMP2	294	22nd	3rd
2006	(France) Paul Belmondo Racing	(France) Patrice Roussel (France) Yann Clairay	Courage C65-Ford	LMP2	48	DNF	DNF
2007	(France) Luc Alphand Aventures	(France) Jean-Luc Blanchemain (Belgium) Vincent Vosse	Chevrolet Corvette C5-R	GT1	306	24th	11th
2009	(France) Signature Plus	(France) Pierre Ragues (France) Franck Mailleux	Courage-Oreca LC70E-Judd	LMP1	344	11th	10th
2010	(France) AIM Team Oreca-Matmut	(France) Soheil Ayari (United Kingdom) Andy Meyrick	Oreca 01-AIM	LMP1	369	4th	4th

=== Complete American Open Wheel racing results ===
(key)

==== Indy Lights ====
Year	Team	1	2	3	4	5	6	7	8	9	10	11	12	13	14	Rank	Points
1997	Autosport Racing	MIA; 22	LBH; 8	NAZ; 25	SAV; 9	STL; 20	MIL; 18	DET; 21	POR; 25	TOR; 4	TRO; 7	VAN; 8	LS; 10	FON		14th	35
1998	PacWest Lights	MIA; 14	LBH; 5	NAZ; 2	STL; 12	MIL; 15	DET; 5	POR; 8	CLE; 3	TOR; 5	MIS; 7	TRO; 5	VAN; 6	LS; 1	FON; 5	2nd	123
1999	PacWest Lights	MIA; 14	LBH; 4	NAZ; 16	MIL; 13	POR; 17	CLE; 17	TOR; 3	MIS; 12	DET; 5	CHI; 13	LS; 1	FON; 3			8th	74

==== Indy Racing League ====
Year	Team	Chassis	No.	Engine	1	2	3	4	5	6	7	8	9	10	11	12	13	Rank	Points	Ref
2001	Galles Racing	G-Force GF05B	32	Oldsmobile Aurora V8	PHX; 27	HMS; 10	ATL; 13	INDY; DNQ	TXS; 17	PPI; 19	RIR; 4	KAN; 16	NSH; 21	KTY; 11	STL; 12	CHI; 13	TX2; 15	20th	188	
