= David Empringham =

Canadian auto racing driver

David Empringham (born December 28, 1963; in Toronto, Ontario, Canada) is a Canadian auto racing driver. He is a two-time Toyota Atlantic, one-time Indy Lights and two-time Continental Tire Sports Car Challenge champion. Most recently, Empringham won the 2012 Grand-Am Continental Tire Sports Car Challenge GS class driver's title with co-driver John Farano.

== Racing career ==
Empringham began his racing career in 1987, competing in the Spenard/David Formula 2000 series. He then competed regularly in the GM Motorsport series (teammate of Canadian racing legend Richard Spenard) for several years, drove a handful of races in the IMSA Firestone Firehawk series, the Porsche Turbo Cup and Formula Toyota Atlantic.

In 1992, Empringham began competing full-time in the Toyota Atlantic Championship, where he won back-to-back championships in 1993 and 1994. In 1993, he won the Championship with "underdog" CANASKA racing and Canadian Tire sponsorship, based out of Toronto, Ontario. 1994 saw Empringham move to the BDJS racing team, based in Indianapolis, Indiana, taking the Canadian Tire sponsorship with him. 1995 saw Empringham narrowly miss winning a third championship, being beat out by Richie Hearn for the title.

1996 saw Empringham make the move to Indy Lights, replacing Greg Moore, who had moved up to the team's CART operation, in the Player's/Forsythe racing Lola. 1996 saw many wins including a thrilling victory in the fastest Indy Lights race ever run on the high banks of Michigan International Speedway during the Inaugural US 500 weekend in May, and ultimately another Championship for "Emp's" mantle, taking the 1996 Indy Lights Title. 1997 saw some successes, but no championship.

In 2001, after several years out of the spotlight, David began competing Part-time in Grand-Am Cup and Grand-Am Motorola series races. During the 2005 season, he managed two victories and eight top-ten finishes on his way to the GS series title with co-driver Scott Maxwell driving for Multimatic Motorsports.

Since then, Empringham has competed in a Mitsubishi Lancer Evolution in Time Attack events for the Sierra Enterprises (USA) team. Empringham is a two-time runner-up at the World Time Attack Challenge in Sydney, Australia (2010, 2011), both times losing out to Tarzan Yamada, who drives for the Japanese Cyber Evo team in a similar Mitsubishi Lancer Evolution.

In 2012, Empringham returned to full-time racing in the Continental Tire Sports Car Challenge with co-driver John Farano in the No. 83 BGB Motorsports Porsche Carrera. After a consistent season of points finishes, Empringham and Farano won the 2012 driver's title despite not winning a round. In 2013, Dave returned to Multimatic Motorsports with Farano to compete in the CTSCC series in the No. 15 Aston Martin Vantage V8 Grand-Am race car.

== Racing record ==
=== American open–wheel racing results ===
(key) (Races in bold indicate pole position) (Races in italics indicate the fastest lap)

==== Atlantic Championship ====
Year	Team	1	2	3	4	5	6	7	8	9	10	11	12	13	14	15	Rank	Points
1991	Canaska Racing	LBH	PHX	LIM	MTL; 23	WGL	DMO	TOR; 6	TRR; DNS	VAN; 11	MDO	NAZ	LAG1	LAG2			**29th**	**15**
1992	Canaska Racing	MIA	PHX	LBH	LIM	MTL; 24	WGL	TOR; 1	TRR; 2	VAN; 18	MDO; 2	**MOS**; 1	NAZ	LAG1; 2	LAG2; 9		**5th**	**96**
1993	Canaska Racing	PHX; 7	LBH; 3	ATL; 3	MIL; 3	MTL; 2	MOS; 3	**HAL**; 2	TOR; 2	NHA; DNS	TRR; 1	VAN; 3	MDO; 4	NAZ; 7	LAG1; 3	LAG2; 4	**1st**	**195**
1994	BDJS Racing	PHX; 9	LBH; 10	MOS; 4	MIL; 2	MTL; 2	**TOR**; 2	**TRR**; 1	MDO; 5	VAN; 1	NAZ; 2	LAG; 4					**1st**	**162**
1995	BDJS Racing	MIA; 4	PHX; 1	LBH; 1	NAZ; 3	**MIL**; 1	MTL; 1	TOR; 2	**TRR1**; 1	TRR2; 13	MDO; 4	**VAN**; 1	LAG; 3				**2nd**	**197**

==== Indy Lights ====
Year	Team	1	2	3	4	5	6	7	8	9	10	11	12	13	Rank	Points	Ref
1996	Forsythe Racing	**HMS**; 1	LBH; 1	NAZ; 2	**MIS**; 1	MIL; 3	**DET**; 21	POR; 3	CLE; 21	TOR; 6	TRO; 4	VAN; 5	LAG; 6		**1st**	**148**	
1997	Forsythe Racing	HMS; 1	LBH; 10	NAZ; 9	SAV; 14	STL; 4	MIL; 2	DET; 4	POR; 7	TOR; 3	TRO; 5	VAN; 5	LAG; 26	FON; 13	**4th**	**107**	

Sporting positions
Preceded by Chris Smith	Toyota Atlantic Champion; 1993–1994	Succeeded by Richie Hearn
Preceded by Greg Moore	Indy Lights Champion; 1996	Succeeded by Tony Kanaan
