= IndyCar Series at the Milwaukee Mile =

Auto race held in West Allis, Wisconsin

Coordinates: 43.02°N 88.01°W

Snap-on Milwaukee Mile 250

IndyCar Series
- Venue: Milwaukee Mile
- Corporate sponsor: Snap-on
- First race: 1937
- First IndyCar race: 2004
- Distance: 253.750 mi (408.371 km)
- Laps: 250
- Most wins (driver): Rodger Ward (7)
- Most wins (manufacturer): Chassis: Lola (16); Engine: Offenhauser (50)

Circuit information
- Surface: Asphalt
- Length: 1 mi (1.6 km)
- Turns: 4

The Milwaukee Mile in West Allis, Wisconsin has hosted American open-wheel car racing events dating back to 1937. The AAA Contest Board, USAC, CART, Champ Car World Series, and the IndyCar Series have all sanctioned races at the facility.

The Milwaukee Mile has a long history of Championship/Indy car racing, and for many years, traditionally held a race the weekend after the Indianapolis 500. The NTT IndyCar Series first held events at Milwaukee from 2004 to 2009, and again from 2011 to 2015. After an eight-year hiatus, the IndyCar Series returned for a doubleheader in 2024. The race is currently known as the Snap-on Milwaukee Mile 250.

== History ==
Open wheel racing at the track dates back to 1937. AAA sanctioned races in 1937–1939, 1941, and 1946–1955. The track was then paved in 1954. For most years starting in 1949, Milwaukee traditionally hosted the first race following the Indianapolis 500. From 1947 to 1982, Milwaukee normally hosted two races, the first race right after Indy in early June, and the second in August or September. The latter sometimes in the days surrounding the Wisconsin State Fair.

USAC sanctioned Championship car races from 1956 to 1979. In 1980, the race switched to a CART (later CCWS) race, and continued through 2006. After the 1982 season, the second race was dropped. With only one race annually going forward, the track decided to keep the traditional June "right after Indy" date. This tradition was famously referenced in the 1969 movie Winning where Robert Wagner's character delivered the line "Everybody goes to Milwaukee after Indianapolis". In 1986, the race was scheduled for Sunday June 1. However, due to rain on May 25–26, the Indianapolis 500 was postponed to Saturday May 31. After discussions with track, television, and series leaders, the Milwaukee race was pushed back one week to make the accommodation.

The IRL/IndyCar Series started holding races at the track beginning in 2004, and thus for a brief time (2004–2006), the track hosted both a Champ Car race (June) and an IndyCar race (late July). For 2007, IndyCar became the lone event. At that time, there was a renewed interest in placing the event on its traditional June date immediately after the Indy 500. This arrangement lasted three years (2007–2009). The race was put on hiatus for 2010, stemming from management difficulties regarding payment of sanctioning fees. In 2011, the race returned with Michael Andretti and Andretti Sports Marketing promoting the event. The race was branded as the Milwaukee Indyfest and included an infield festival reminiscent of street racing formats with vendors, paddock access, music stages, family zones and the signature Ferris Wheel. The Milwaukee IndyFest ran for four years, with ABC Supply joining as the title sponsor in 2013.

In 2011–2013, for a variety of reasons, race organizers decided to move the race to the Saturday of Father's Day weekend. Detroit took the weekend immediately after Indy, and Texas maintained its position on the second weekend of June. For 2014, the race moved to August reviving the old state fair date. For 2015, it moved back to July, then went on hiatus due to poor revenue and poor attendance.

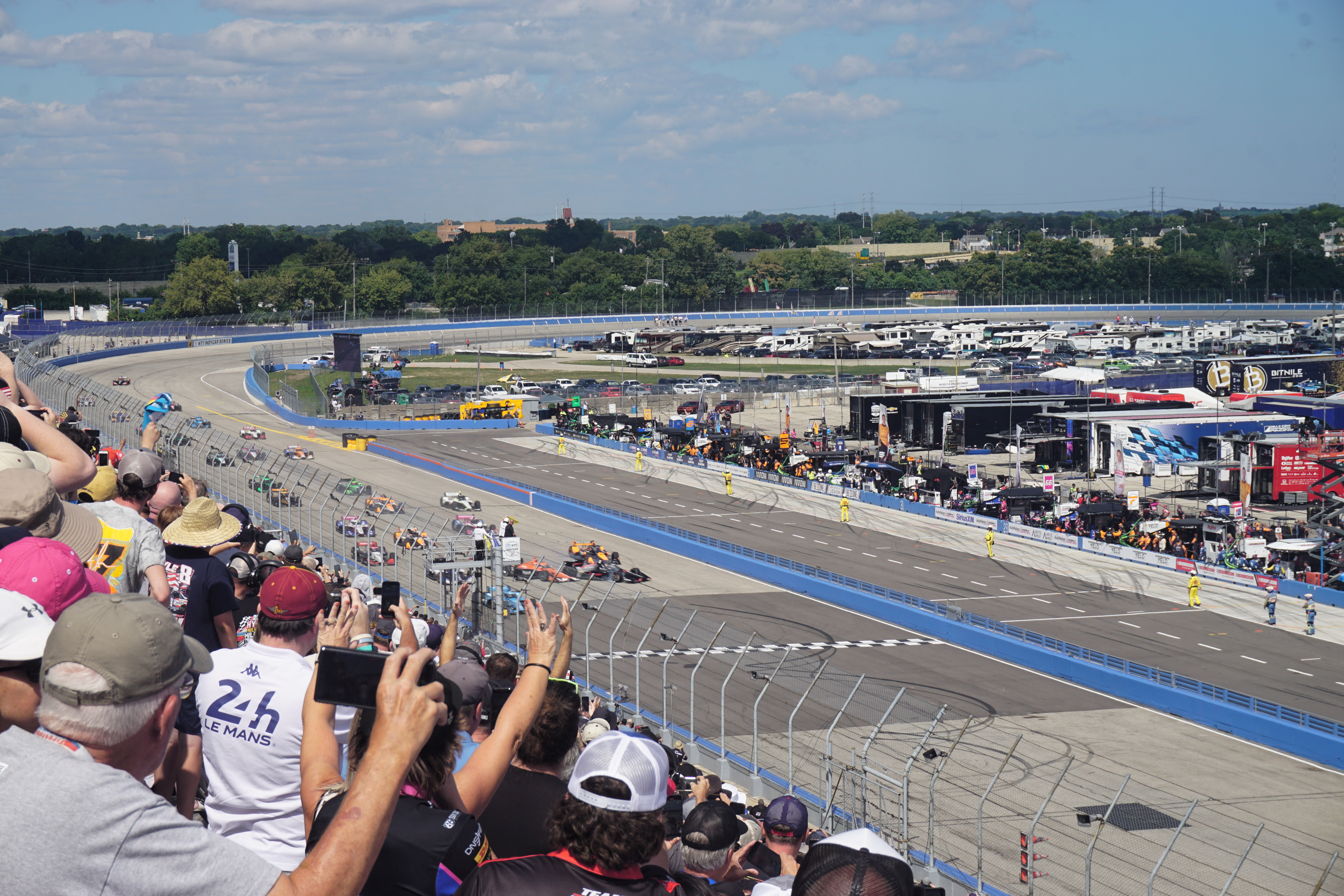
Abandoned start of the second race in 2024 Hy-Vee Milwaukee Mile 250s.

After eight years, and after track renovations, the race returned in 2024 as a doubleheader on Labor Day weekend, with Hy-Vee sponsoring. In 2025, Snap-on sponsored the single-header event, and then in 2026, returned as a doubleheader. On August 27, 2026, it was revealed that Milwaukee would be on the IndyCar schedule for the next five-years.

=== Race history and facts ===
From 1950 to 1987, the June race was called the Rex Mays Classic, in honor of Rex Mays, a two-time AAA national champion killed in a race in 1949. Meanwhile, the August race was named the Tony Bettenhausen 200 from 1961 to 1982 in reference of Tony Bettenhausen, who died after a crash in 1961.

In the 1963 Tony Bettenhausen 200, Jim Clark and Team Lotus became the first to win an American Championship race with a rear-engined, monocoque car. After finishing second in that year's Indianapolis 500, Lotus decided to run the car again at Milwaukee and Trenton. Clark and teammate Dan Gurney broke the track record by over a second in qualifying, and Clark led all 200 laps to win, lapping the entire field except for second place A. J. Foyt.

At the 1991 race, for the first time in the history of Championship/Indy car racing, three members of the same family finished 1st–2nd–3rd in a race. Michael Andretti won the race, second went to his cousin John, and third to his father Mario. The Andretti family swept the podium, while Michael's brother Jeff finished 11th.

== Past winners ==
Season	Date	Driver	Team	Chassis	Engine	Race Distance		Race Time	Average Speed (mph)	Report
Season	Date	Driver	Team	Chassis	Engine	Laps	Miles (km)	Race Time	Average Speed (mph)	Report
AAA Championship Car
1937^{NC}	August 29	Rex Mays	N/A	Adams	Sparks	96*	96 (154.497)	1:07:59	N/A	Report
1938^{NC}	August 28	Chet Gardner	N/A	Miller	Offy	100	100 (160.934)	1:11:08	84.345	Report
1939	August 27	Babe Stapp	Mike Boyle	N/A	Offy	100	100 (160.934)	1:11:43	83.651	Report
1940	Not held									
1941	August 24	Rex Mays (2)	N/A	Stevens	Winfield	100	100 (160.934)	1:12:55	82.249	Report
1942– 1945	Not held (World War II)									
1946	September 22	Rex Mays (3)	Charles Bowes	Stevens	Winfield	100	100 (160.934)	1:10:44	84.815	Report
1947	June 8	Bill Holland	Fred Peters	Wetteroth	Offy	100	100 (160.934)	1:08:44	82.281	Report
1947	July 27	Charles Van Acker	Tucker Partners	Stevens	Lencki	100	100 (160.934)	1:09:47	85.963	Report
1947	August 24	Ted Horn	Ted Horn	Horn	Offy	100	100 (160.934)	1:11:08	84.336	Report
1948	June 6	Emil Andres	Carmine Tuffanelli	Kurtis	Offy	100	100 (160.934)	1:10:19	85.319	Report
1948	August 15	Johnny Mantz	J.C. Agajanian	Kurtis	Offy	100	100 (160.934)	1:10:19	85.326	Report
1948	August 29	Myron Fohr/Tony Bettenhausen^{A}	Carl Marchese	Marchese	Offy	200	200 (321.869)	2:18:21	86.734	Report
1949	June 5	Myron Fohr (2)	Carl Marchese (2)	Marchese	Offy	100	100 (160.934)	1:11:45	83.615	Report
1949	August 28	Johnnie Parsons	Kurtis Kraft	Kurtis	Offy	200	200 (321.869)	2:19:49	85.818	Report
1950	June 11	Tony Bettenhausen (2)	Murrell Belanger	Wetteroth	Offy	100	100 (160.934)	1:10:33	85.027	Report
1950	August 27	Walt Faulkner	J.C. Agajanian (2)	Kurtis	Offy	200	200 (321.869)	2:17:26	87.315	Report
1951	June 10	Tony Bettenhausen (3)	Murrell Belanger	Kurtis	Offy	100	100 (160.934)	1:06:38	90.024	Report
1951	August 26	Walt Faulkner (2)	Agajanian-Grant (3)	Kuzma	Offy	200	200 (321.869)	2:11:22	91.343	Report
1952	June 8	Mike Nazaruk	McNamara	Kurtis/Wetteroth	Offy	100	100 (160.934)	1:05:02	92.255	Report
1952	August 24	Chuck Stevenson	Bessie Lee Paoli	Kurtis	Offy	200	200 (321.869)	2:27:26	81.392	Report
1953	June 7	Jack McGrath	Jack Hinkle	Kurtis	Offy	100	100 (160.934)	1:04:04	93.634	Report
1953	August 30	Chuck Stevenson (2)	J.C. Agajanian (4)	Kuzma	Offy	200	200 (321.869)	2:13:57	89.58	Report
1954	June 6	Chuck Stevenson (3)	J.C. Agajanian (5)	Kuzma	Offy	100	100 (160.934)	1:01:31	97.529	Report
1954	August 29	Manny Ayulo	Peter Schmidt	Kuzma	Offy	200	200 (321.869)	2:04:39	96.261	Report
1955	June 5	Johnny Thomson	Peter Schmidt (2)	Kuzma	Offy	100	100 (160.934)	1:00:42	98.844	Report
1955	August 28	Pat Flaherty	Dunn Engineering	Kurtis	Offy	250	250 (402.336)	2:37:50	95.022	Report
USAC Championship Car
1956	June 10	Pat Flaherty (2)	John Zink	Watson	Offy	100	100 (160.934)	1:00:42	98.846	Report
1956	August 26	Jimmy Bryan	Dean Van Lines	Kuzma	Offy	250	250 (402.336)	2:41:45	92.736	Report
1957	June 9	Rodger Ward	N/A	Lesovsky	Offy s/c	100	100 (160.934)	1:01:21	97.789	Report
1957	August 25	Jim Rathmann	N/A	Epperly	Offy	200	200 (321.868)	2:02:17	98.133	Report
1958	June 8	Art Bisch	N/A	Kuzma	Offy	100	100 (160.934)	1:03:49	94.013	Report
1958	August 24	Rodger Ward (2)	N/A	Lesovsky	Offy	200	200 (321.868)	2:02:41	97.864	Report
1959	June 7	Johnny Thomson	Racing Associates	Lesovsky	Offy	100	100 (160.934)	1:00:51	98.609	Report
1959	August 30	Rodger Ward (3)	Leader Card Racing	Watson	Offy	200	200 (321.868)	2:04:35	96.445	Report
1960	June 5	Rodger Ward (4)	Leader Card Racing (2)	Watson	Offy	100	100 (160.934)	1:00:19	99.465	Report
1960	August 28	Len Sutton	S-R Racing Enterprises	Watson	Offy	200	200 (321.868)	1:59:51	100.131	Report
1961	June 4	Rodger Ward (5)	Leader Card Racing (3)	Watson	Offy	100	100 (160.934)	0:57:46	103.86	Report
1961	August 20	Lloyd Ruby	John Zink Trackburner (2)	Watson	Offy	200	200 (321.868)	1:58:04	101.638	Report
1962	June 10	A. J. Foyt	N/A	Trevis	Offy	100	100 (160.934)	0:59:29	100.7	Report
1962	August 20	Rodger Ward (6)	Leader Card Racing (4)	Watson	Offy	200	200 (321.868)	1:59:59	100.017	Report
1963	June 9	Rodger Ward (7)	N/A	Watson	Offy	100	100 (160.934)	0:59:39	100.561	Report
1963	August 18	Jim Clark	Team Lotus	Lotus	Ford	200	200 (321.868)	1:54:53	104.452	Report
1964	June 7	A. J. Foyt (2)	Sheraton-Thompson	Watson	Offy	100	100 (160.934)	0:59:48	100.346	Report
1964	August 23	Parnelli Jones	N/A	Lotus	Ford	200	200 (321.868)	1:54:33	104.751	Report
1965	June 6	Parnelli Jones (2)	Agajanian/Hurst (6)	Lotus	Ford	100	100 (160.934)	0:58:58	101.743	Report
1965	August 14	Joe Leonard	All American Racers	Halibrand	Ford	150	150 (241.401)	1:32:31	97.276	Report
1965	August 22	Gordon Johncock	N/A	Gerhardt	Offy	200	200 (321.868)	1:59:28	100.47	Report
1966	June 5	Mario Andretti	Dean Van Lines (2)	Brawner Hawk	Ford	100	100 (160.934)	1:02:44	96.515	Report
1966	August 27	Mario Andretti (2)	Dean Van Lines (3)	Brawner Hawk	Ford	200	200 (321.868)	1:55:19	104.061	Report
1967	June 4	Gordon Johncock (2)	N/A	Gerhardt	Ford	150	150 (241.401)	1:31:14	98.643	Report
1967	August 20	Mario Andretti (3)	Dean Van Lines (4)	Brawner Hawk	Ford	200	200 (321.868)	1:53:52	103.386	Report
1968	June 9	Lloyd Ruby (2)	Gene White	Mongoose	Offy t/c	150	150 (241.401)	1:29:20	100.739	Report
1968	August 18	Lloyd Ruby (3)	Gene White (2)	Mongoose	Offy t/c	200	200 (321.868)	1:50:22	108.735	Report
1969	June 8	Greg Weld/Art Pollard^{A}	N/A	Gerhardt	Offy t/c	150	150 (241.401)	1:20:15	112.157	Report
1969	August 18	Al Unser	Vel's Parnelli Ford	Lola	Ford t/c	200	200 (321.868)	1:52:24	106.758	Report
1970	June 7	Joe Leonard (2)	Vel's Parnelli Ford (2)	Colt	Ford t/c	150	150 (241.401)	1:23:06	108.3	Report
1970	August 23	Al Unser (2)	Vel's Parnelli Ford (3)	Colt	Ford t/c	200	200 (321.868)	1:44:59	114.307	Report
1971	June 6	Al Unser (3)	Vel's Parnelli Ford (4)	Colt	Ford t/c	150	150 (241.401)	1:18:19	114.858	Report
1971	August 15	Bobby Unser	All American Racers (2)	Eagle	Offy t/c	200	200 (321.868)	1:49:42	109.386	Report
1972	June 4	Bobby Unser (2)	All American Racers (3)	Eagle	Offy t/c	150	150 (241.401)	1:22:28	109.131	Report
1972	August 13	Joe Leonard (3)	Vel's Parnelli Jones Racing (5)	Parnelli	Offy t/c	200	200 (321.868)	1:47:28	111.652	Report
1973	June 10	Bobby Unser (3)	All American Racers (4)	Eagle	Offy t/c	150	150 (241.401)	1:18:59	113.965	Report
1973	August 12	Wally Dallenbach	Patrick Racing	Eagle	Offy t/c	200	200 (321.868)	1:50:47	108.32	Report
1974	June 9	Johnny Rutherford	Team McLaren	McLaren	Offy t/c	150	150 (241.401)	1:21:39	110.225	Report
1974	August 11	Gordon Johncock (3)	Patrick Racing (2)	Eagle	Offy t/c	200	200 (321.868)	1:41:03	118.752	Report
1975	June 8	A. J. Foyt (3)	Gilmore Racing	Coyote	Foyt t/c	150	150 (241.401)	1:18:55	114.042	Report
1975	August 17	Mike Mosley	Jerry O'Connell Racing	Eagle	Offy t/c	200	200 (321.868)	1:44:54	114.393	Report
1976	June 13	Mike Mosley (2)	Jerry O'Connell Racing (2)	Eagle	Offy t/c	150	150 (241.401)	1:14:02	121.577	Report
1976	August 22	Al Unser (4)	Vel's Parnelli Jones Racing (6)	Parnelli	Cosworth t/c	200	200 (321.868)	1:38:26	121.907	Report
1977	June 12	Johnny Rutherford (2)	Team McLaren (2)	McLaren	Cosworth t/c	150	150 (241.401)	1:36:49	92.962	Report
1977	August 21	Johnny Rutherford (3)	Team McLaren (3)	McLaren	Cosworth t/c	200	200 (321.868)	1:55:37	103.798	Report
1978	June 18	Rick Mears	Penske Racing	Penske	Cosworth t/c	150	150 (241.401)	1:14:35	120.677	Report
1978	August 20	Danny Ongais	Interscope Racing	Parnelli	Cosworth t/c	200	200 (321.868)	1:50:43	108.369	Report
1979	June 10	A. J. Foyt (4)	Gilmore Racing	Parnelli	Cosworth t/c	150	150 (241.401)	1:22:36	108.955	Report
1979	August 12	Roger McCluskey	AMI Racing	Lola	Cosworth t/c	200	200 (321.868)	1:42:27	117.135	Report
CART Championship Car history
1980	June 8	(United States) Bobby Unser (4)	Penske Racing (2)	Penske	Cosworth	150	150 (241.401)	1:19:48	112.773	Report
1980	August 10	(United States) Johnny Rutherford (4)	Chaparral Racing	Chaparral	Cosworth	200	200 (321.868)	1:54:13	105.063	Report
1981	June 7	(United States) Mike Mosley (3)	All American Racers (5)	Eagle	Chevrolet	150	150 (241.401)	1:19:03	113.838	Report
1981	September 5	(United States) Tom Sneva	Bignotti-Cotter	March	Cosworth	200	200 (321.868)	1:41:41	118.013	Report
1982	June 13	(United States) Gordon Johncock (4)	Patrick Racing (3)	Wildcat	Cosworth	150	150 (241.401)	1:10:52	126.987	Report
1982	August 1	(United States) Tom Sneva (2)	Bignotti-Cotter (2)	March	Cosworth	200	200 (321.868)	1:49:57	109.132	Report
1983	June 12	(United States) Tom Sneva (3)	Bignotti-Cotter (3)	March	Cosworth	150	150 (241.401)	1:17:42	115.83	Report
1984	June 3	(United States) Tom Sneva (4)	Mayer Motorsports Ltd	March	Cosworth	200	200 (321.868)	1:41:41	118.03	Report
1985	June 2	(United States) Mario Andretti (4)	Newman/Haas Racing	Lola	Cosworth	200	200 (321.868)	1:36:38	124.162	Report
1986	June 8	(United States) Michael Andretti	Kraco Racing	March	Cosworth	200	200 (321.868)	1:42:45	116.788	Report
1987	May 31	(United States) Michael Andretti (2)	Kraco Racing (2)	March	Cosworth	200	200 (321.868)	1:47:17	111.853	Report
1988	June 5	(United States) Rick Mears (2)	Penske Racing (3)	Penske	Chevrolet-Ilmor	200	200 (321.868)	1:37:42	122.819	Report
1989	June 4	(United States) Rick Mears (3)	Penske Racing (4)	Penske	Chevrolet-Ilmor	200	200 (321.868)	1:32:11	130.16	Report
1990	June 3	(United States) Al Unser Jr.	Galles/Kraco Racing (3)	Lola	Chevrolet-Ilmor	200	200 (321.868)	1:29:46	133.67	Report
1991	June 2	(United States) Michael Andretti (3)	Newman/Haas Racing (2)	Lola	Chevrolet-Ilmor	200	200 (321.868)	1:29:10	134.577	Report
1992	June 28	(United States) Michael Andretti (4)	Newman/Haas Racing (3)	Lola	Ford-Cosworth	200	200 (321.868)	1:26:56	138.031	Report
1993	June 6	(United Kingdom) Nigel Mansell	Newman/Haas Racing (4)	Lola	Ford-Cosworth	200	200 (321.868)	1:48:08	110.97	Report
1994	June 5	(United States) Al Unser Jr. (2)	Penske Racing (5)	Penske	Ilmor	192*	192 (308.994)	1:36:57	118.804	Report
1995	June 4	(Canada) Paul Tracy	Newman/Haas Racing (5)	Lola	Ford-Cosworth	200	200 (321.868)	1:27:23	137.304	Report
1996	June 2	(United States) Michael Andretti (5)	Newman/Haas Racing (6)	Lola	Ford-Cosworth	200	200 (321.868)	1:33:32	128.282	Report
1997	June 1	(Canada) Greg Moore	Forsythe Racing	Reynard	Mercedes-Benz	200	200 (321.868)	1:43:32	119.597	Report
1998	May 31	(United States) Jimmy Vasser	Chip Ganassi Racing	Reynard	Honda	200	200 (321.868)	1:34:17	131.349	Report
1999	June 6	(Canada) Paul Tracy (2)	Team Green	Reynard	Honda	225	225 (362.102)	1:48:49	128.029	Report
2000	June 4	(Colombia) Juan Pablo Montoya	Chip Ganassi Racing (2)	Lola	Toyota	225	225 (362.102)	1:37:38	142.684	Report
2001	June 3	(Sweden) Kenny Bräck	Team Rahal	Lola	Ford-Cosworth	225	225 (362.102)	1:54:08	122.066	Report
2002	June 2	(Canada) Paul Tracy (3)	Team Green (2)	Lola	Honda	250	250 (402.336)	1:59:27	129.583	Report
2003	May 31	(Mexico) Michel Jourdain Jr.	Team Rahal (2)	Lola	Ford-Cosworth	250	250 (402.336)	2:16:45	113.19	Report
2004	June 5	(United States) Ryan Hunter-Reay	Herdez Competition	Lola	Ford-Cosworth	250	250 (402.336)	1:59:12	129.859	Report
2005	June 4	(Canada) Paul Tracy (4)	Forsythe Racing (2)	Lola	Ford-Cosworth	221*	221 (355.665)	1:45:01	130.301	Report
2006	June 4	(France) Sébastien Bourdais	Newman/Haas Racing (7)	Lola	Ford-Cosworth	197*	197 (317.04)	1:45:03	116.101	Report
IndyCar Series
2004	July 25	(United Kingdom) Dario Franchitti	Andretti Green Racing	Dallara IR-04	Honda	225	228.375 (367.534)	1:46:49	128.272	Report
2005	July 24	(United States) Sam Hornish Jr.	Team Penske (6)	Dallara IR-05	Toyota	225	228.375 (367.534)	1:51:39	122.733	Report
2006	July 23	(Brazil) Tony Kanaan	Andretti Green Racing (2)	Dallara IR-05	Honda	225	228.375 (367.534)	1:42:38	133.513	Report
2007	June 3	(Brazil) Tony Kanaan (2)	Andretti Green Racing (3)	Dallara IR-05	Honda	225	228.375 (367.534)	1:47:42	127.220	Report
2008	June 1	(Australia) Ryan Briscoe	Team Penske (7)	Dallara IR-05	Honda	225	228.375 (367.534)	1:42:42	133.428	Report
2009	May 31	(New Zealand) Scott Dixon	Chip Ganassi Racing (3)	Dallara IR-05	Honda	225	228.375 (367.534)	1:38:44	138.784	Report
2010	Not held									
2011	June 19	(United Kingdom) Dario Franchitti (2)	Chip Ganassi Racing (4)	Dallara IR-05	Honda	225	228.375 (367.534)	1:56:44	117.390	Report
2012	June 16	(United States) Ryan Hunter-Reay (2)	Andretti Autosport (4)	Dallara DW12	Chevrolet	225	228.375 (367.534)	1:52:18	122.020	Report
2013	June 15	(United States) Ryan Hunter-Reay (3)	Andretti Autosport (5)	Dallara DW12	Chevrolet	250	253.75 (408.37)	1:51:15	136.848	Report
2014	August 17	(Australia) Will Power	Team Penske (8)	Dallara DW12	Chevrolet	250	250.75 (403.54)	1:44:49	145.243	Report
2015	July 12	(France) Sébastien Bourdais (2)	KVSH Racing	Dallara DW12	Chevrolet	250	250.75 (403.54)	1:56:46	130.373	Report
2016 — 2023	Not held									
2024	August 31	(Mexico) Pato O'Ward	Arrow McLaren	Dallara DW12 IR-18	Chevrolet	250	250.75 (403.54)	2:03:01	123.758	Report
2024	September 1	(New Zealand) Scott McLaughlin	Team Penske (9)	Dallara DW12 IR-18	Chevrolet	250	250.75 (403.54)	2:06:31	120.334	Report
2025	August 24	(Denmark) Christian Rasmussen	Ed Carpenter Racing	Dallara DW12 IR-18	Chevrolet	250	250.75 (403.54)	2:02:08	124.656	Report
2026	August 29–30*	(Mexico) Pato O'Ward (2)	Arrow McLaren (2)	Dallara DW12 IR-18	Chevrolet	250	250.75 (403.54)	2:11:42	155.601	Report
2026	August 30	(Mexico) Pato O'Ward (3)	Arrow McLaren (3)	Dallara DW12 IR-18	Chevrolet	250	250.75 (403.54)	1:57:50	129.204	Report

=== Notes ===
AAA Championship Car

- 1937: Race shortened due to scoring error.

^NC Non-championship race
^A Shared drive

USAC Championship Car
^A Shared drive

CART Championship Car

- 1981: Tony Bettenhausen 200 was originally scheduled for August 2, but was rained out and postponed until September 5.
- 1994: Race shortened due to rain.
- 2005-06: Race shortened due to a time limit (1:45).

IRL/IndyCar Series

- 2026 (Race 1) Snap-on Makers & Fixers 250 was originally scheduled for August 29, but was red flagged after 90 laps due to rain. The remaining 160 laps were completed the next day.

=== Indianapolis 500 / Milwaukee winners ===
For most years from 1949 to 2009, Milwaukee traditionally hosted a Championship/Indy car race the weekend immediately following the Indianapolis 500. Numerous drivers managed to win both races in the same year in back-to-back weeks.

- 1947: Bill Holland
- 1956: Pat Flaherty
- 1964: A. J. Foyt
- 1971: Al Unser Sr.
- 1974: Johnny Rutherford
- 1982: Gordon Johncock
- 1983: Tom Sneva
- 1988: Rick Mears
- 1994: Al Unser Jr.
- 2000: Juan Pablo Montoya (Indianapolis was an IRL race, Milwaukee was a CART series race)

=== Support race history ===
ARS/Indy Lights/Indy NXT

Season	Date	Winning driver
1986	June 8	(United States) Mike Groff
1987	May 31	(Belgium) Didier Theys
1988	June 4	(United States) Dave Simpson
1989	June 4	(United States) Mike Groff
1990	June 3	(Canada) Paul Tracy
1991	June 2	(United States) Robbie Groff
1992	June 28	(Mexico) Adrian Fernandez
1993	June 6	(United States) Bryan Herta
1994	June 5	(United Kingdom) Steve Robertson
1995	June 4	(Canada) Greg Moore
1996	June 2	(United States) Mark Hotchkis
1997	June 1	(United States) Clint Mears
1998	May 31	(Republic of Ireland) Derek Higgins
1999	June 6	(Republic of Ireland) Derek Higgins
2000	June 5	(New Zealand) Scott Dixon
2001	June 3	(United States) Townsend Bell
2002– 2003	Not held	
2004	July 25	(United States) Paul Dana
2005	July 24	(United States) Jeff Simmons
2006	July 22	(Brazil) Jaime Camara
2007	June 2	(United Kingdom) Alex Lloyd
2008	June 1	(United States) Bobby Wilson
2009	May 31	(Brazil) Mario Romancini
2010	Not held	
2011	June 19	(Argentina) Esteban Guerrieri
2012	June 15	(France) Tristan Vautier
2013	June 15	(United States) Sage Karam
2014	August 17	(United States) Zach Veach
2015	July 12	(Puerto Rico) Félix Serrallés
2016 — 2023	Not held	
2024	August 31	(United Kingdom) Louis Foster
2025	August 24	(Mexico) Salvador de Alba
2026	August 30	(United States) Max Garcia

Atlantic Championship

Season	Date	Winning driver
1988	May 15	(United States) Jocko Cunningham
1989– 1992	Not held	
1993	June 5	(Canada) Claude Bourbonnais
1994	June 4	(United States) Greg Ray
1995	June 3	(Canada) David Empringham
1996	June 1	(United States) Anthony Lazzaro
1997	May 31	(United States) Alex Barron
1998	May 30	(United States) Memo Gidley
1999	June 5	(Canada) Lee Bentham
2000	June 3	(Argentina) Martín Basso
2001	June 2	(Brazil) Hoover Orsi
2002	June 2	(United States) Roger Yasukawa
2003	June 1	(United Kingdom) Ryan Dalziel
2004	June 5	(United States) Jon Fogarty

USF Pro 200 Championship

Season	Date	Winning driver
2026	August 30	(United States) Thomas Schrage

Preceded by Freedom 250 Grand Prix	IndyCar Series; Ontario Honda Dealers Indy at Markham	Succeeded by IndyCar Monterey Grand Prix
