= 1995 Atlantic Championship =

1995 Toyota Atlantic Championship season
- Player's Toyota Atlantic Championship

Season
- Races: 12
- Start date: March 4
- End date: September 9

Awards
- Drivers' champion: (United States) Richie Hearn
- Teams' champion: (United States) Della Penna Motorsports

The 1995 Toyota Atlantic Championship season was the 22nd season of the Atlantic Championship. It was contested over 12 races between March 4 and September 9, 1995. The Player's Toyota Atlantic Championship Drivers' Champion was Richie Hearn driving for Della Penna Motorsports.

== Races ==
Rnd	Race Name	Circuit	City/Location	Date	Pole position	Winning driver	Winning team
1	(United States) 1995 Miami	Bicentennial Park	Miami, Florida	March 4	(Canada) Patrick Carpentier	(Canada) Patrick Carpentier	(United States) Lynx Racing
2	(United States) 1995 Phoenix	Phoenix International Raceway	Phoenix, Arizona	April 2	(Canada) Patrick Carpentier	(Canada) David Empringham	
3	(United States) 1995 Long Beach	Streets of Long Beach	Long Beach, California	April 9	(United States) Richie Hearn	(Canada) David Empringham	
4	(United States) 1995 Nazareth	Nazareth Speedway	Nazareth, Pennsylvania	April 22	(Canada) Patrick Carpentier	(Canada) Patrick Carpentier	(United States) Lynx Racing
5	(United States) 1995 Milwaukee	Milwaukee Mile	West Allis, Wisconsin	June 3	(Canada) David Empringham	(Canada) David Empringham	
6	(Canada) 1995 Montréal	Circuit Gilles Villeneuve	Montreal, Quebec	June 12	(Canada) Patrick Carpentier	(Canada) David Empringham	
7	(Canada) 1995 Toronto	Exhibition Place	Toronto, Ontario	July 15	(United States) Richie Hearn	(United States) Richie Hearn	(United States) Della Penna Motorsports
8	(Canada) 1995 Trois-Rivières 1	Circuit Trois-Rivières	Trois-Rivières, Quebec	August 6	(United States) Richie Hearn	(Canada) David Empringham	
9	(Canada) 1995 Trois-Rivières 2	Circuit Trois-Rivières	Trois-Rivières, Quebec	August 6	(United States) Richie Hearn	(United States) Richie Hearn	(United States) Della Penna Motorsports
10	(United States) 1995 Mid-Ohio	Mid-Ohio Sports Car Course	Lexington, Ohio	August 13	(United States) Richie Hearn	(United States) Richie Hearn	(United States) Della Penna Motorsports
11	(Canada) 1995 Vancouver	Streets of Vancouver	Vancouver, British Columbia	September 2	(Canada) David Empringham	(Canada) David Empringham	
12	(United States) 1995 Laguna Seca	Mazda Raceway Laguna Seca	Monterey, California	September 9	(United States) Case Montgomery	(United States) Case Montgomery	(United States) Condor Motorsports

Oval/Speedway
Road Course/Street Circuit

== Final driver standings ==
Pos	Name	MIA (United States)	PHX (United States)	LBH (United States)	NAZ (United States)	MIL (United States)	MTL (Canada)	TOR (Canada)	TR1 (Canada)	TR2 (Canada)	MOH (United States)	VAN (Canada)	LGA (United States)	Pts
1	(United States) Richie Hearn	3	2	**5**	2	5	2	**1**	**2**	**1**	**1**	2	2	201
2	(Canada) David Empringham	4	1	1	3	**1**	1	2	1	13	4	**1**	3	197
3	(Canada) Patrick Carpentier	**1***	**4**	18	**1**	2	**21**	3	5	6	7	4	21	129
4	(United States) Case Montgomery			4		14	3	4	3	2	8	3	**1***	114
5	(United States) Colin Trueman	20	13	3	11	13	7	7	4	24	3	13	5	83
6	(Brazil) Felipe Giaffone	7	9	8	4	4	18	17	29	4	6	14	8	80
7	(Brazil) José Giaffone	11	12	2	7	8	6	6	12	9	23	19	26	73
8	(Canada) Lee Bentham						5	8	25	3	2	5	4	72
9	(United States) Clint Mears	10	19	6	12	7	19	5	7	19	9	6	25	66
10	(United States) Eric Lang	9	8	7	5		25	13	11	7	12	16	10	62
11	(United States) Jim Guthrie	22	7	14	10	3	15	14	9	20	10		23	47
12	(United States) Stan Wattles	5	21	16	14	6	23	18	14	8	11	18	11	43
13	(Japan) Shigeaki Hattori					12	26	16	26	5	5	15	7	36
14	(Canada) Bernie Schuchmann	19	10	13	9	9	13	15	23	15		12	18	32
15	(United States) Sergi Szortyka	8			13		11	9			28			23
16	(United States) Chris Smith					DNS	4	19	6	23				22
17	(United States) Michael David		14	25		10	17		15	17	14	8	13	22
18	(United States) Pete Wise		3	9									22	21
19	(United States) Billy Roe		5		6									21
20	(United States) Joe Sposato		11	10			9					DNS	14	20
21	(United Kingdom) Jonathan Clues	18	6	22								DNS	9	17
22	(Canada) Paolo Dal Cin						24	20	8	22		7		17
23	(United States) Bill Auberlen	2		21										16
24	(United States) Gary Peterson	23		15	8	11								14
25	(United States) Peter Baron	13		11			20	10	17	DNS	16			14
26	(Canada) Martin Roy						8	21	13	26				11
27	(United States) Charlie Nearburg										27		6	10
28	(United States) Mark Dismore	6												10
29	(Canada) Martin Guimont								10	25		17	12	10
30	(Canada) Michael Clifford						12	11						9
31	(United States) Bobby Scolo								DNS	28	15	9	17	8
32	(Canada) Cam Binder		20	DSQ					21	10	20			6
33	(New Zealand) Steve Cameron						10							6
34	(New Zealand) Craig Simmiss											10		6
35	(United States) Tom Calicchio	15							18	11	17			6
36	(United States) Bob Ferstl	14					16	12	20	27	26			6
37	(United States) Mario Hernandez							DNS			18	11	24	5
38	(United States) Jimmy Pugliese								22	12				4
39	(United States) Zak Brown			12										4
40	(United States) Harry Puterbaugh	12												4
41	(United States) Mike Shank										13			3
42	(United States) Mike Sauce		16				14				25			2
43	(United States) Ron Caldwell	23	17	19					27	14				2
44	(United States) Dan Vosloo		15	17					24	18	22		20	1
45	(United States) Mike Palumbo	21			15									1
46	(Australia) Ian Bland			24									15	1
	(Canada) Tony Nabico						DNS	DNS	19	16				0
	(United States) John Brooks		22		16									0
	(United States) Mike Agnifilo								16	DNS				0
	(United States) Steve Hall												16	0
	(Peru) Neto Jochamowitz	16												0
	(United States) Nevil Algie	17												0
	(United States) Richard Soutar		18	20										0
	(United States) Brian French										19			0
	(United States) Marcelo Gaffoglio												19	0
	(United States) Nick Kunewalder								28	21				0
	(United States) Robert Sollenskog						22				21			0
	(United States) Bill Pratt			23										0
	(United States) Jim Ward										24			0
	(United States) Yoichi Akase			26										0
	(United States) Bob Siska												27	0
	(United States) Dennis Asbury			DNS										0
	(United States) Ken Gerhardt										DNS			0
Pos	Name	MIA (United States)	PHX (United States)	LBH (United States)	NAZ (United States)	MIL (United States)	MTL (Canada)	TOR (Canada)	TR1 (Canada)	TR2 (Canada)	MOH (United States)	VAN (Canada)	LGA (United States)	Pts

Color	Result
Gold	Winner
Silver	2nd place
Bronze	3rd place
Green	4th & 5th place
Light Blue	6th–10th place
Dark Blue	Finished (Outside Top 10)
Purple	Did not finish
Red	Did not qualify (DNQ)
Brown	Withdrawn (Wth)
Black	Disqualified (DSQ)
White	Did not start (DNS)
Blank	Did not participate (DNP)
Blank	Not competing

**In-line notation**
**Bold**	Pole position (1 point)
*	Led most race laps (1 points)
^{1}	Qualifying cancelled no bonus point awarded

Point Scoring System:

- Points are awarded based on each driver's resulting place (regardless of whether the car is running at the end of the race):

Position	1	2	3	4	5	6	7	8	9	10	11	12	13	14	15
Points	20	16	14	12	11	10	9	8	7	6	5	4	3	2	1

=== Final driver standings C2 Class (Top 3) ===
Pos	Driver	Pts
1	(Canada) Bernie Schuchmann	151
2	(United States) Michael David	141
3	(United States) Peter Baron	89

== See also ==
- 1995 IndyCar season
- 1995 Indy Lights season
