= IndyCar Series at Phoenix Raceway =

Auto race held in Avondale, Arizona

Good Ranchers 250

IndyCar Series
- Venue: Phoenix Raceway (1964–2005, 2016–2018, 2026)
- First race: 1964
- Distance: 255.5 mi (411.2 km)
- Laps: 250
- Previous names: Phoenix 100/150/200: 1964, 1973–1974, 1980, 1983, 1985, 1997; Jimmy Bryan Memorial: 1965–1968; Jimmy Bryan 150: 1969–1972, 1976–1978; Bricklin 150: 1975; Arizona Republic/Jimmy Bryan 150: 1979; Kraco Car Stereo 150: 1981–1982; Dana–Jimmy Bryan 150: 1984; Dana 200: 1986; Checker 200: 1987–1988; Checker Autoworks 200: 1989; Autoworks 200: 1990; Valvoline 200: 1991–1993; Slick-50 200: 1994–1995; Dura-Lube 200: 1996, 1998; MCI WorldCom 200: 1999–2000; Pennzoil/Copper World Indy 200: 2001; Bombardier ATV Indy 200: 2002; Purex/Dial Indy 200: 2003; Copper World Indy 200: 2004; XM Satellite Radio 200 presented by Argent Mortgage: 2005; Desert Diamond West Valley Phoenix Grand Prix: 2016–2018 Former second race: Bobby Ball Memorial: 1964–1968; Bobby Ball 200: 1969; Bobby Ball 150: 1970–1971; Best Western 150: 1972; Arizona 150: 1973; Phoenix 150: 1974–1975; Bobby Ball 150: 1976–1977; Miller High Life Bobby Ball Memorial 150: 1978; Miller High Life 150: 1979–1983; Stroh's 150: 1984; Dana 150: 1985; Circle K/Fiesta Bowl 200: 1986
- Most wins (driver): Johnny Rutherford (3); Bobby Unser (3); Rick Mears (3); Former fall race: A. J. Foyt (4); Al Unser (4)
- Most wins (manufacturer): Chassis: Dallara (11); Engine: Chevrolet (11)

The Phoenix Raceway in Avondale, Arizona, United States has hosted American open-wheel car racing since 1964. The United States Auto Club (USAC) moved the fall race from the Arizona State Fairgrounds and added a spring race to the newly built Phoenix International Raceway in 1964. The races became part of the Championship Auto Racing Teams (CART) series in 1979. The fall race was cancelled after 1986, but the spring race continued and joined the Indy Racing League (IRL) in 1996. It was held continuously through 2005.

After a hiatus of eleven years, the race was revived by the IndyCar Series in 2016. It was held on Saturday night under the lights. Long considered a popular Indycar track, Phoenix saw the final career victory for Mario Andretti (1993).

The race was last held in 2018 as part of the IndyCar Series. It was often known as the Jimmy Bryan Memorial in its early years. The race returned in 2026 under the Good Ranchers 250.

The previous fall race occurred from 1964 to 1986. The Circle K/Fiesta Bowl 200 was the final name of a CART race held annually at the Raceway from 1979 though 1986; it was known as the Miller High Life 150 for five editions and by multiple other names during that period. Prior to that, it was operated under USAC.

== History ==
In 1915, and again from 1950 through 1963, AAA and then USAC sanctioned championship car races were held at the Arizona State Fairgrounds speedway, the Phoenix 100. The race date transferred to Phoenix International Raceway (PIR) upon its opening in 1964.

During its time on the USAC championship car circuit, PIR typically held two races annually, one in the spring, and one in the fall. During the CART years, two races were scheduled through the mid-1980s, but the track dropped down to one race per year starting in 1987. In many years, Phoenix served as the CART season opener. After a feud between the track ownership and CART series officials, the track was dropped from the CART schedule after 1995, and immediately switched to the IRL beginning in 1996.

Over the entire history of the fall race, A. J. Foyt and Al Unser each won four times, the most of any driver. Foyt's wins came in 1960 at the Fairgrounds and then in 1965, 1971, and 1975 at the Raceway. Unser's wins all came at the Raceway, in 1969, 1976, 1979, and 1985. The most consecutive wins was three, by Tom Sneva in 1980, 1981, and 1982. Sneva's three wins were the most by any driver under CART's sanction of the race (1979–1986).

Citing low attendance, the spring race was put on hiatus after the 2005 season. In 2007, the Grand Prix Arizona for the Champ Car World Series was planned on a street circuit in downtown Phoenix, near the original course used for the United States Grand Prix. The event was cancelled four months before the event due to insufficient sponsorship funding.

After a long hiatus, the track returned to the IndyCar Series schedule in 2016. The race was the only 1-mile oval on the schedule. The race was scheduled for a twilight start, and raced into the night under the lights. With the reconfiguring of the track in 2011, the circuit measured 1.022 miles in length, and the race was scheduled for 255.5 miles. Desert Diamond West Valley was announced as the title sponsor of the race for 2016 on March 23. Following the 2018 race the raceway announced the series would not return for 2019, citing poor attendance.

In 2025, Racer reported that Phoenix would make a return for the 2026 season. On September 16, it was confirmed that Phoenix will return to the calendar, in conjunction with NASCAR.

== Past winners ==
Season	Date	Driver	Team	Chassis	Engine	Race Distance		Race Time	Average Speed (mph)	Report
Season	Date	Driver	Team	Chassis	Engine	Laps	Miles (km)	Race Time	Average Speed (mph)	Report
USAC Championship Car history
1964	March 22	(United States) A. J. Foyt	Anstead-Thompson Racing	Watson	Offenhauser	100	100 (160.934)	0:55:48	107.536	
1964	November 22	(United States) Lloyd Ruby	Bill Forbes Racing	Halibrand RE	Offenhauser	200	200 (321.868)	1:51:23	107.736	
1965	March 28	(United States) Don Branson	Leader Card Racers	Watson	Offenhauser	150	150 (241.401)	1:24:33	106.456	
1965	November 21	(United States) A. J. Foyt (2)	Anstead-Thompson Racing (2)	Lotus RE	Ford	200	200 (321.868)	2:00:01	99.99	
1966	March 20	(United States) Jim McElreath	John Zink Company	Brabham	Ford	150	150 (241.401)	1:31:05	98.828	
1966	November 20	(United States) Mario Andretti	Dean Racing Enterprises	Brawner Hawk	Ford	200	200 (321.868)	1:54:38	104.697	
1967	April 9	(United States) Lloyd Ruby (2)	Gene White Firestone	Mongoose	Ford	150	150 (241.401)	1:44:18	86.296	
1967	November 19	(United States) Mario Andretti (2)	Dean Racing Enterprises	Brawner Hawk	Ford	200	200 (321.868)	1:49:13	109.872	
1968	April 7	(United States) Bobby Unser	Leader Card Racers (2)	Eagle	Offenhauser	150	150 (241.401)	1:29:10	100.938	
1968	November 17	(United States) Gary Bettenhausen	Gerhardt Racing	Gerhardt	Offenhauser	200	200 (321.868)	1:54:19	104.972	
1969	March 30	(United States) George Follmer	George Follmer Racing	Cheetah	Chevrolet	150	150 (241.401)	1:21:55	109.8	
1969	November 15	(United States) Al Unser	Vel's Parnelli Jones Racing	Lola	Ford	200	200 (321.868)	1:48:59	110.109	
1970	March 28	(United States) Al Unser (2)	Vel's Parnelli Jones Racing (2)	P.J. Colt	Ford	150	150 (241.401)			
1970	November 21	(United States) Swede Savage	All American Racers	Eagle	Ford	150	150 (241.401)	1:17:30	116.807	
1971	March 27	(United States) Al Unser (3)	Vel's Parnelli Jones Racing (3)	P.J. Colt	Ford	150	150 (241.401)	1:20:40	111.565	
1971	October 23	(United States) A. J. Foyt (3)	Anstead-Thompson Racing (3)	Coyote 71	Ford	150	150 (241.401)	1:21:18	110.333	
1972	March 18	(United States) Bobby Unser (2)	All American Racers (2)	Eagle	Offenhauser	150	150 (241.401)	1:27:32	102.805	
1972	November 4	(United States) Bobby Unser (3)	All American Racers (3)	Eagle	Offenhauser	150	150 (241.401)	1:10:31	127.618	
1973	March 17	Race postponed by rain and eventually cancelled due to infrastructure damage and scheduling conflicts.								
1973	November 3	(United States) Gordon Johncock	STP-Patrick Racing	Eagle	Offenhauser	150	150 (241.401)	1:18:15	115.015	
1974	March 17	(United States) Mike Mosley	Agajanian-Leader Card Racers (3)	Eagle	Offenhauser	150	150 (241.401)	1:17:08	116.663	
1974	November 2	(United States) Gordon Johncock (2)	STP-Patrick Racing (2)	Eagle	Offenhauser	150	150 (241.401)	1:12:28	124.202	
1975	March 16	(United States) Johnny Rutherford	Team McLaren	McLaren	Offenhauser	150	150 (241.401)	1:21:06	110.971	
1975	November 9	(United States) A. J. Foyt (4)	Gilmore-Foyt Racing	Coyote	Foyt TC	150	150 (241.401)	1:21:02	111.055	
1976	March 14	(United States) Bobby Unser (4)	Bob Fletcher Racing	Eagle	Offenhauser	150	150 (241.401)			
1976	November 7	(United States) Al Unser	Vel's Parnelli Jones Racing (4)	Parnelli	Cosworth	150	150 (241.401)	1:23:34	107.695	
1977	March 27	(United States) Johnny Rutherford (2)	Team McLaren (2)	McLaren	Cosworth	150	150 (241.401)	1:20:48	111.395	
1977	October 29	(United States) Gordon Johncock (3)	Patrick Racing (3)	Wildcat	Offenhauser	150	150 (241.401)	1:22:53	108.597	
1978	March 18	(United States) Gordon Johncock (4)	Patrick Racing (4)	Wildcat	Offenhauser	150	150 (241.401)	1:17:05	116.757	
1978	October 28	(United States) Johnny Rutherford (3)	Team McLaren (3)	McLaren	Cosworth	150	150 (241.401)	1:14:24	120.974	
CART Championship Car history
1979	March 11	(United States) Gordon Johncock (5)	Patrick Racing (5)	Penske	Cosworth	150	150 (241.401)	1:15:23	119.389	Report
1979	October 20	(United States) Al Unser (2)	Chaparral Cars	Chaparral	Cosworth	150	150 (241.401)	1:13:03	123.203	
1980	March 2	Race cancelled due to Salt River floods								
1980	November 8	(United States) Tom Sneva	Jerry O'Connell Racing	Phoenix	Cosworth	150	150 (241.401)	1:30:04	99.925	
1981	March 22	(United States) Johnny Rutherford (4)	Chaparral Cars (2)	Chaparral	Cosworth	150	150 (241.401)	1:17:08	116.681	
1981	October 31	(United States) Tom Sneva (2)	Bignotti-Cotter Racing	March	Cosworth	150	150 (241.401)	1:20:10	112.266	
1982	March 28	(United States) Rick Mears	Team Penske	Penske PC-10	Cosworth	150	150 (241.401)	1:15:48	118.727	
1982	November 6	(United States) Tom Sneva (3)	Bignotti-Cotter Racing (2)	March 82C	Cosworth	150	150 (241.401)	1:21:05	110.997	
1983	March 20	Race cancelled due to Salt River floods								
1983	October 29	(Italy) Teo Fabi	Forsythe Racing	March 83C	Cosworth	150	150 (241.401)	1:11:03	126.671	
1984	April 14	(United States) Tom Sneva (4)	Mayer Racing	March 84C	Cosworth	150	150 (241.401)	1:14:39	120.555	
1984	October 13	(United States) Bobby Rahal	Truesports	March 84C	Cosworth	150	150 (241.401)	1:31:47	98.048	
1985	March 31	Race postponed due to general deterioration of the track; it was held on the originally discontinued fall date								
1985	October 13	(United States) Al Unser (3)	Team Penske (2)	March 85C	Cosworth	150	150 (241.401)	1:14:35	120.644	
1986	April 6	(United States) Kevin Cogan	Patrick Racing (6)	March 86C	Cosworth	200	200 (321.868)	1:39:42	120.345	
1986	October 19	(United States) Michael Andretti	Kraco Racing	March 86C	Cosworth	200	200 (321.868)	1:29:06	134.676	
1987	April 12	(Colombia) Roberto Guerrero	Vince Granatelli Racing	March 87C	Cosworth	200	200 (321.868)	1:26:56	138.02	
1988	April 10	(United States) Mario Andretti (3)	Newman/Haas Racing	Lola T8800	Chevrolet	200	200 (321.868)	1:38:22	121.992	
1989	April 9	(United States) Rick Mears (2)	Team Penske (3)	Penske PC-18	Chevrolet	200	200 (321.868)	1:35:09	126.112	
1990	April 8	(United States) Rick Mears (3)	Team Penske (4)	Penske PC-19	Chevrolet	200	200 (321.868)	1:35:01	126.291	
1991	April 21	(Netherlands) Arie Luyendyk	Vince Granatelli Racing (2)	Lola T9100	Chevrolet	200	200 (321.868)	1:32:18	129.988	
1992	April 5	(United States) Bobby Rahal (2)	Rahal/Hogan Racing	Lola T9200	Chevrolet	200	200 (321.868)	1:31:56	130.529	
1993	April 4	(United States) Mario Andretti (4)	Newman/Haas Racing (2)	Lola T9300	Ford-Cosworth	200	200 (321.868)	1:36:53	123.847	
1994	April 10	(Brazil) Emerson Fittipaldi	Team Penske (5)	Penske PC-23	Chevrolet	200	200 (321.868)	1:51:41	107.437	
1995	April 2	(United States) Robby Gordon	Walker Racing	Reynard 95i	Ford-Cosworth	200	200 (321.868)	1:29:33	133.98	
Indy Racing League history
1996	March 24	(Netherlands) Arie Luyendyk (2)	Treadway Racing	Reynard 95i	Ford-Cosworth	200	200 (321.868)	1:42:14	117.368	Report
1997	March 23	(United States) Jim Guthrie	Blueprint Racing	Dallara	Oldsmobile	200	200 (321.868)	2:14:33	89.19	Report
1998	March 22	(United States) Scott Sharp	Kelley Racing	Dallara	Oldsmobile	200	200 (321.868)	2:02:19	98.11	Report
1999	March 28	(Canada) Scott Goodyear	Panther Racing	G-Force	Oldsmobile	200	200 (321.868)	1:56:40	102.856	
2000	March 19	(United States) Buddy Lazier	Hemelgarn Racing	Riley & Scott	Oldsmobile	200	200 (321.868)	1:47:11	111.957	
2001	March 18	(United States) Sam Hornish Jr.	Panther Racing (2)	Dallara	Oldsmobile	200	200 (321.868)	1:35:57	125.072	Report
2002	March 17	(Brazil) Hélio Castroneves	Team Penske (6)	Dallara	Ford-Cosworth	200	200 (321.868)	1:43:00	116.504	
2003	March 23	(Brazil) Tony Kanaan	Andretti Green Racing	Dallara	Honda	200	200 (321.868)	1:59:55	100.073	
2004	March 21	(Brazil) Tony Kanaan (2)	Andretti Green Racing (2)	Dallara	Honda	200	200 (321.868)	1:33:46	127.981	
2005	March 19	(United States) Sam Hornish Jr. (2)	Team Penske (7)	Dallara	Toyota	200	200 (321.868)	1:30:24	137.753	
2006 – 2015	Not held									
IndyCar Series history
2016	April 2	(New Zealand) Scott Dixon	Chip Ganassi Racing	Dallara	Chevrolet	250	255.5 (411.186)*	1:49:39	139.822	Report
2017	April 29	(France) Simon Pagenaud	Team Penske (8)	Dallara	Chevrolet	250	255.5 (411.186)	1:46:25	144.058	Report
2018	April 7	(United States) Josef Newgarden	Team Penske (9)	Dallara	Chevrolet	250	255.5 (411.186)	1:44:00	147.395	Report
2019 – 2025	Not held									
2026	March 7	(United States) Josef Newgarden (2)	Team Penske (10)	Dallara	Chevrolet	250	255.5 (411.186)	1:51:14	134.785	Report

* After 2011 reconfiguration, track measures 1.022 miles (1.645 km).

=== Support races ===
Season	Date	Winning driver	Chassis	Engine
ARS / Indy Lights Series
1986	April 6	(New Zealand) Steve Millen	March	Buick
1986	October 19	(Italy) Fabrizio Barbazza	March	Buick
1987	April 12	(United States) Jeff Andretti	March	Buick
1988	April 9	(Canada) Paul Tracy	March	Buick
1989	April 8	(United States) Mike Groff	March	Buick
1990	April 7	(Canada) Paul Tracy	March	Buick
1991	April 21	(United States) Robbie Groff	March	Buick
1992	April 5	(Mexico) Adrián Fernández	March	Buick
1993	April 4	(United States) Sandy Brody	Lola	Buick
1994	April 10	(Canada) Greg Moore	Lola	Buick
1995	April 2	(Canada) Greg Moore	Lola	Buick
2003	March 22	(United Kingdom) Mark Taylor	Dallara	Infiniti
2004	March 20	(Brazil) Thiago Medeiros	Dallara	Infiniti
2005	March 20	(United States) Jon Herb	Dallara	Infiniti
2016	April 2	(United States) Kyle Kaiser	Dallara IL-15	Mazda-AER MZR-R

Season	Date	Winning driver
SCCA Super Vee Series
1980	November 8	(United States) Al Unser Jr.
1981	October 31	(United States) Pete Halsmer
1982	March 28	(United States) Michael Andretti
1982	November 6	(United States) Michael Andretti
1983	October 29	(Canada) Ludwig Heimrath Jr.
1984	April 15	(Canada) Ludwig Heimrath Jr.
1985	October 13	(United States) Jeff Andretti
1986	October 19	(United States) Mike Groff
1987	April 12	(United States) Ken Johnson
1988	April 10	(United States) Ken Murillo
1989	April 9	(United States) Robbie Groff
1990	April 8	(United States) Stuart Crow

Season	Date	Winning driver	Chassis	Engine
USAC Mini Indy Series
1977	October 29	(United States) Herm Johnson	Lola	Volkswagen
1978	March 18	(United States) Tim Richmond	Lola	Volkswagen
1978	October 28	(United States) Kevin Cogan	Ralt	Volkswagen
Formula Atlantic
1991	April 20	John Tanner	Swift DB-4	Toyota
1992	April 4	Russell Spence	Reynard 92H	Toyota
1993	April 3	Stuart Crow	Ralt RT-40	Toyota
1994	April 9	Greg Ray	Ralt RT-41	Toyota
1995	April 2	Class C1: David Empringham; Class C2: Bernie Schuchmann	Ralt RT-41; Swift DB-4	Toyota

Season	Date	Winning driver
USAC Silver Crown Series
2017	April 29	Bobby Santos III
2018	April 7	Bobby Santos III

== Selected race summaries ==
=== Former Fall race ===
- 1980: Johnny Rutherford led the first 37 laps, then on lap 71 was chasing leader Tom Sneva. Dicing through slower traffic, Rutherford slipped by Sneva in turn three to take the lead. He then suffered a spectacular crash. Coming out of turn four, he touched wheels with Dennis Firestone and spun into the outside wall. Then the car flipped up in the air and landed upside-down on its roll bar. Rutherford escaped with a concussion and only minor cuts and lacerations.
- 1985: In the second-to-last race of the season at Phoenix, Al Unser Sr. and Al Unser Jr. finished first-second, and ended the day within three points of each other going into the season finale. The father and son battle for the 1985 championship is famous in Indy car lore.

=== CART Championship Car ===
- 1986: Michael Andretti led 78 laps, but his engine started smoking on lap 163. Kevin Cogan took the lead on lap 164, and won his first (and only) career Indy car race. Cogan finished a lap ahead of second place Tom Sneva.
- 1987: Roberto Guerrero qualified third, but failed post-qualifying inspection for being 2.5 pounds underweight. He was forced to start last on the grid. Guerrero quickly charged through the field, and was in the top five by lap 46. He dueled with Bobby Rahal for the lead on lap 62, and dominated the second half. Even a stop-and-go penalty for hitting a tire in the pits did not slow Guerrero's run. Guerrero won by 8 seconds over Rahal, becoming only the fourth driver in modern Indy car history to win a race from the last starting position and the first Colombian to win a racing career in history.
- 1988: Polesitter Rick Mears led the first 22 laps, and stretched out to a large, dominating lead. Coming out of turn four on lap 22, however, Mears tangled with Randy Lewis, spun down the main stretch, and came to rest with a broken suspension. Mario Andretti led the final 135 laps to win.
- 1989: Danny Sullivan held the lead late, but his Penske teammate Rick Mears blew by him on lap 183. Sullivan pitted for tires, but his pitside tank had no more fuel to take on. Mears had a lap on the entire field as he stretched his fuel to the victory. At the line, Al Unser Jr. barely held off Sullivan for second place.
- 1990: Rick Mears made it back-to-back victories at Phoenix, this time in dominating fashion. Mears led the final 132 laps, nearly lapping the field at one point. The attention focused on the battle for second between Galles-Kraco Racing teammates Bobby Rahal and Al Unser Jr. On lap 189, Rahal was able to weave through lapped traffic and pass Unser for second, as Mears cruised to victory.
- 1991: Arie Luyendyk, driving for the fledgling Bob Tezak UNO/Granatelli Racing, took the lead on lap 143. Luyendyk pulled out to a large lead while Bobby Rahal, Emerson Fittipaldi, and Michael Andretti battled wheel-to-wheel for second. Fittipaldi and Rahal were side-by-side when Danny Sullivan's Alfa Romeo engine blew, bringing out the yellow and white flag. Fittipaldi passed Rahal, but it was after the yellow light came on. Luyendyk won his second Indy car race, and Rahal was restored to second.
- 1992: Bobby Rahal led wire-to-wire, leading all 200 laps en route to victory. Rahal became the first driver to accomplish that feat at Phoenix since A. J. Foyt in 1964. Michael Andretti qualified for the pole position, the first pole for the Ford-Cosworth XB engine, but his car didn't even pull away from the starting grid. He was pushed to the pits due to fouled spark plugs, and started the race four laps behind the field.
- 1993: Rookie Nigel Mansell arrived at Phoenix anticipating his first open wheel oval race, but crashed during practice and sat out with a back injury. Mansell's teammate Mario Andretti won the race, and became the oldest winner of an Indy car race (53 years, 34 days). It was Mario Andretti's final Indy car victory.
- 1994: Hiro Matsushita touched wheels with Teo Fabi in turn three on lap 63. The two cars crashed and collected leader Paul Tracy. Seconds later, rookie Jacques Villeneuve came upon the scene in the high groove, and t-boned Matsushita's car, splitting it in two, and sending it spinning wildly to the infield. Matsushita escaped with no injuries besides a sore shoulder. Later in the race, Mario Andretti crashed on the backstretch, and Michael Andretti clipped another car, which sheared off his left front wheel, which bounced into a spectator area. No injuries were reported. Emerson Fittipaldi won, with his Penske teammate Al Unser Jr. second. After sitting out the race a year before, Nigel Mansell placed third.
- 1995: In the closing laps, Paul Tracy and Emerson Fittipaldi battled for the lead. Both had to pit though for a "splash-and-go" to make it to the finish. With 7 laps to go Fittipaldi's pit stop handed the lead to Michael Andretti, but Andretti did not realize he had inherited the lead. Andretti allowed Robby Gordon to pass him for the lead with five laps to go, and Gordon won his first career CART series race. It would be the final CART series race at Phoenix.

=== IndyCar Series ===
- 1996: The race switched to the new Indy Racing League. On lap 128, Foyt Racing drivers Scott Sharp and Mike Groff (running 1st-2nd) ducked into the pits for their final stop. However, they did not see that the yellow flag had come out, and were penalized one lap for pitting while the pits were closed. Arie Luyendyk cruised over the final 66 laps to victory. During a practice run, Buddy Lazier suffered a fractured back after a crash. Lazier would come back to win the Indy 500 two months later.
- 1997: Independent owner/driver Jim Guthrie authored one of the biggest underdog wins in Indy Racing League/IndyCar history. On lap 180, a crash involving Sam Schmidt brought out a lengthy yellow flag. Guthrie stayed out, looking to stretch his fuel over the final 82 laps. Guthrie held off a hard-charging Tony Stewart over the final ten laps to secure his lone Indy car victory. Going into the race, Guthrie was forced to take out a second mortgage on his home to purchase his chassis.
- 1998: On lap 59, Eliseo Salazar spun and collected Dave Steele and Robbie Buhl. Trying to avoid the crash, Arie Luyendyk touched wheels with Salazar, and slid through turn 2 upside down. On lap 169, the leaders pitted under caution, but Scott Sharp stayed out, gambling on track position. On lap 186, Kenny Brack and Mike Groff touched wheels, crashing hard. The long yellow allowed Sharp to conserve fuel. With two laps to go, the green came out with Sharp leading. Tony Stewart and Billy Boat were caught up behind the slow car of Mark Dismore, allowing Sharp to hold on for the win. After the race, Dismore was fined $5,000 for unsportsmanlike conduct, and Sharp was fined $15,000 when he failed post-race inspection with an oversized fuel tank.
- 2001: In preparations for their return to the Indianapolis 500, Penske Racing enters their CART regulars Hélio Castroneves and Gil de Ferran for the IRL season opener at Phoenix. Both Penske cars, however, would drop out. Sam Hornish Jr., driving in his first start for Panther Racing, won his first career Indy car race. Hornish beat the leaders out of the pits with 73 laps to go, and dominated the rest of the way.
- 2005: Tomas Scheckter brushed the outside wall in turn four on lap 193, bringing out the caution, and setting up a two-lap sprint to the checkered flag. Sam Hornish Jr. led Dario Franchitti and Hélio Castroneves. Hornish got a good jump on the restart, while Franchitti slipped high in turn two, whitewalling the tires. Hornish won the race, while Franchitti fell back to 4th. Tony Kanaan, who finished third, started 21st and passed half the field on the first lap.
- 2016: After an eleven-year hiatus, the IndyCar Series returned to Phoenix for a race under the lights. The track had been slightly reconfigured since the last race in 2005, and now was measured at 1.022 miles in length. In addition, the race length was lengthened to 250 laps. Hélio Castroneves broke the track record during qualifying, setting a new one-lap record of 192.631 mph. Passing was difficult during the race, and tire wear was a major factor. Penske teammates Castroneves and Juan Pablo Montoya both suffered tire failures while leading in the first half. Scott Dixon took the lead and led the final 155 laps to victory.

Preceded by Grand Prix of St. Petersburg	IndyCar Series; Good Ranchers 250	Succeeded by Java House Grand Prix of Arlington
