= Clint Mears =

American racing driver (born 1973)

- Nationality: American
- Born: January 12, 1973 (age 53) Bakersfield, California, U.S.
- Relatives: Casey Mears; Rick Mears; Roger Mears

Indy Lights career
- Starts: 19
- Championships: 0
- Wins: 2
- Podiums: 2
- Poles: 3
- Best finish: 8th in 1997

Previous series
- 1997–1998 1996 1994–1995: Indy Lights; NASCAR Craftsman Truck Series; Toyota Atlantic

NASCAR FedEx Freight Truck Series career
- 0 races run over 1 year
- Best finish: 140th (1996)
Wins	Top tens	Poles
0	0	0
- Statistics up to date as of October 30, 2017.

Clint Mears (born January 12, 1973) is an American racing driver from Bakersfield, California. Clint is the son of Indy 500 champion Rick Mears and cousin of NASCAR driver Casey Mears. He has retired from automobile racing but currently competes in motocross events.

== Career ==
Mears competed in the Toyota Atlantic championship part-time in 1994 and full-time in 1995. In 1995, he finished 9th in the championship with a best finish of fifth in Toronto. In 1996, he was out of professional racing except for a failed attempt to make his NASCAR debut in a Craftsman Truck Series race at North Wilkesboro Speedway where he failed to qualify. In 1997, he moved to the Indy Lights series where he raced full-time as a teammate to his cousin; he finished eighth in points, scoring victories at the Milwaukee Mile, the same track as his father's first IndyCar win, and at California Speedway. Mears returned to the series in 1998 but missed some races and in the races he did compete in only managed a best finish of eighth. This was the end of his professional racing career; he became a driving instructor at Irwindale Speedway, competing in a NASCAR Winston West Series event there; he intended to return to the Craftsman Truck Series during 2000 or 2001 with Core Motorsports, but a ride did not materialise.

Mears also dabbled in off-road racing and motocross. He returned to amateur motocross in 2012 at the age of 39 after a lengthy absence.

== Motorsports career results ==
=== NASCAR ===
(key) (Bold – Pole position awarded by qualifying time. Italics – Pole position earned by points standings or practice time. * – Most laps led.)

==== Craftsman Truck Series ====
NASCAR Craftsman Truck Series results
Year	Team	No.	Make	1	2	3	4	5	6	7	8	9	10	11	12	13	14	15	16	17	18	19	20	21	22	23	24	NCTC	Pts
1996	Kim Spruell Racing	82		HOM	PHO	POR	EVG	TUS	CNS	HPT	BRI	NZH	MLW	LVL	I70	IRP	FLM	GLN	NSV	RCH	NHA	MAR	NWS; DNQ	SON	MMR	PHO	LVS	140	13

=== American open-wheel racing results ===
(key) (Races in bold indicate pole position) (Races in italics indicate fastest lap)

==== Indy Lights ====
Year	Team	1	2	3	4	5	6	7	8	9	10	11	12	13	14	Rank	Points
1997	Team Mears	MIA; 12	LBH; 18	NAZ; 7	SAV; 18	**STL**; 11	**MIL**; 1*	DET; 18	POR; DNS	TOR; 13	TRO; 12	VAN; 14	LS; DNS	**FON**; 1		8th	53
1998	Team Mears	MIA; DNS	LBH	NAZ; 18	STL; 17	MIL; 19	DET; 17	POR	CLE; 16	TOR	MIS; 8	TRO	VAN	LS; 10	FON; 22	24th	8
