= 1997 Dixie Crystals Grand Prix =

(United States) 1997 Hutchinson Island Savannah
Race details
- 4th round of the 1997 PPG/Firestone Indy Lights Championship Powered By Buick season
- Date: May 18, 1997
- Official name: Dixie Crystals Grand Prix
- Location: Grand Prize of America Road Course
- Course: Parkland circuit 1.965 mi / 3.162 km
- Distance: 50 laps 98.25 mi / 158.10 km

Pole position
- Driver: (Brazil) Hélio Castroneves (Tasman Motorsports)
- Time: 1:04.824

Fastest lap
- Driver: (Brazil) Hélio Castroneves (Tasman Motorsports)
- Time: 1:05.726 (on lap of 50)

Podium
- First: (Brazil) Hélio Castroneves (Tasman Motorsports)
- Second: (Brazil) Sérgio Paese (FRE Racing)
- Third: (Canada) Lee Bentham (Forsythe Racing)

The 1997 Dixie Crystals Grand Prix was the fourth race of the 1997 PPG/Firestone Indy Lights Championship Powered By Buick. The race took place on May 18 in Savannah, Georgia, United States, on Grand Prize of America Road Course parkland circuit on Hutchinson Island; a river island in the Savannah River, north of downtown Savannah. The race was won by Hélio Castroneves for Tasman Motorsports. Sérgio Paese finished second ahead of Lee Bentham, Luiz Garcia Jr., and Naoki Hattori.

== Report ==
=== Background ===
In the 1990s, a group of local businessmen formed the Colonial Motorsport company, deciding it was time to bring back international racing action to Savannah. Major international races had last been held on the streets of Savannah with the American Grand Prize in 1908, 1910, and 1911; and the Vanderbilt Cup Race in 1911. After four years of careful negotiations, an agreement was reached for a stand-alone Indy Lights race, with follow up events in '98 and '99 offering the possibility of a future CART round. Public monies helped build a 1.965-mile county road to serve as a 10-turn circuit; the first time a public road had been pre-designed with the intention of also using it for racing in the USA.

Mark Blundell quoted, after a feasibility test for future CART races, "As a drivers track, it's good, It's quite demanding and really physical. It's a fun circuit to drive, and there are at least two and possibly three spots for overtaking. It doesn't have a street course feel, it's more of a road course feel. From a spectator viewpoint, there are plenty of great vantage points."

The event looked like a modest success; drivers seemed happy with the course, fans turned out in reasonable numbers, and a contract was in place for future years. However, creditors and several companies involved in the construction didn't want to give the promoters a reasonable time frame to make the event profitable. The resulting lawsuit threw Colonial Motorsport company into Chapter 11, and all its contracts, including the one with CART, were dissolved. The track itself came into public ownership and fell into disrepair.

== Classification ==
=== Indy Lights ===
Pos	Qual	Driver	Team	Laps	Laps Led	Points
1	1	(Brazil) Hélio Castroneves	Tasman Motorsports	50	50	22
2	4	(Brazil) Sérgio Paese	FRE Racing	50		16
3	10	(Canada) Lee Bentham	Forsythe Racing	50		14
4	3	(Brazil) Luiz Garcia Jr.	Dorricott Racing	50		12
5	15	(Japan) Naoki Hattori	Team Green	50		10
6	7	(Japan) Hideki Noda	Indy Regency Racing	50		8
7	17	(Brazil) Oswaldo Negri Jr.	Genoa Racing	50		6
8	12	(Brazil) Airton Daré	Brian Stewart Racing	49		5
9	5	(France) Didier André	Autosport Racing	49		4
10	13	(Sweden) Fredrik Larsson	Johansson Motorsports	49		3
11	16	(United States) Bob Dorricott, Jr.	Dorricott Racing	49		2
12	9	(France) Christophe Tinseau	Conquest Racing	49		1
13	24	(United States) Casey Mears	Team Mears	49		
14	6	(Canada) David Empringham	Forsythe Racing	48 Crash		
15	8	(Japan) Shigeaki Hattori	Lucas Place Motorsports	48 Crash		
16	14	(United States) Chris Simmons	Team Green	48		
17	11	(United States) Mark Hotchkis	Team Green	48		
18	25	(United States) Clint Mears	Team Mears	47 Off Course		
19	23	(Canada) John Jones	Eclipse Racing	45		
20	20	(United States) Geoff Boss	Team Medlin	42 Wheel		
21	19	(Brazil) Cristiano da Matta	Brian Stewart Racing	16 Crash		
22	18	(United States) Robby Unser	PacWest Lights	16 Crash		
23	2	(Brazil) Tony Kanaan	Tasman Motorsports	15 Throttle		
24	21	(United States) Jaques Lazier	Brian Stewart Racing	8 Crash		
25	22	(Mexico) Rodolfo Lavín	Indy Regency Racing	1 Crash		
DNS	DNQ	(United States) Dave DeSilva	Lucas Place Motorsports			

Notes: All teams used a Normally-Aspirated Buick V6 engine producing 425 hp, and the Lola T97/20 chassis.

== Support Races ==
=== North American Touring Car Championship ===
Season	Date	Pole position	Winning driver	Winning team
1997	May 17	(United States) Peter Cunningham	(United States) Peter Cunningham	Honda American Racing Team
1997	May 18	(United States) Peter Cunningham	(United States) Peter Cunningham	Honda American Racing Team

=== Barber Dodge Pro Series ===
Season	Date	Pole position	Fastest lap	Winning driver
1997	May 18	(United States) Derek Hill	(United States) Rocky Moran Jr.	(United States) Derek Hill

=== USAC Formula Ford 2000 ===
Season	Date	Winning driver	Chassis
1997	May 18	(Brazil) Luciano Zangirolami	Van Diemen RF97
