= Frank Allers =

Canadian road racer

Frank Allers is a Canadian road racer who was inducted into the Canadian Motorsport Hall of Fame in 2002. Currently Frank owns and operates 'Frank Allers Autosport' in North Vancouver, British Columbia, Canada, where he has established a reputation as an excellent mechanic specializing in high-end, high-performance vehicles.
