= Leader Card Racers =

American former racing team

(United States) Leader Card Racers
- Owner(s): Robert Wilke; Ralph Wilke
- Base: Milwaukee, Wisconsin, US
- Series: United States Auto Club; Championship Auto Racing Teams
- Opened: 1958

Career
- Drivers' Championships: 3 (1959, 1962, 1968)
- Indy 500 victories: 3 (1959, 1962, 1968)

Leader Card Racers (often shortened as Leader Card) was an American racing team which competed in the United States Auto Club (USAC) Championship Car and Championship Auto Racing Teams (CART) series from 1958 to 1994. Leader Card Racers won the 1959, 1962, and 1968 Indianapolis 500. The team also participated in USAC midget car, Silver Crown, and sprint car races.

== History ==
Prior to founding Leader Card Racers, Robert "Bob" C. Wilke (1907 or 1908 – November 24, 1970) operated a midget car supplier from 1938 to 1948. After suffering a heart attack in 1952, a renewed interest in sports cars led to the formation of the Leader Card team in 1958.

Leader Card Racers saw immediate success in 1959. Rodger Ward won four races, including the Indianapolis 500, and won the USAC National Championship. Jim Rathmann and the Leader Card team won the Race of Two Worlds at the Monza Circuit with an average speed of 166.7 miles per hour (268.3 km/h). Ward again won the Indianapolis 500 with Leader Card in 1962 and again won the National Championship. The Leader Card trio of Wilke, Ward, and mechanic A.J. Watson were sometimes referred to as the Triple W.

Chuck Rodee, driving a year-old Leader Card car, died after crashing in turn 1 attempting to qualify for the 1966 Indianapolis 500. Later in the year, Don Branson won the final Champ Car race of his career in a Leader Card car at the Illinois State Fairgrounds Racetrack.

Bobby Unser won both the 1968 Indianapolis 500 and the 1968 USAC Championship Car championship driving the #3 Rislone Special.

After his death in 1970, Bob Wilke's son Ralph became the head of the team, downsizing the team from two cars to one. Leader Card Racers failed to qualify a car for the Indianapolis 500 from 1981 to 1985, breaking the streak in 1986 with Gary Bettenhausen. Following the 1994 CART season, Leader Card Racers decided to fold the Indy car program citing increasing costs.

Leader Card Racers were the first entrant of the inaugural Bryan Clauson Classic in 2018 at the dirt oval in the infield of the Indianapolis Motor Speedway.
