= Brawner Hawk =

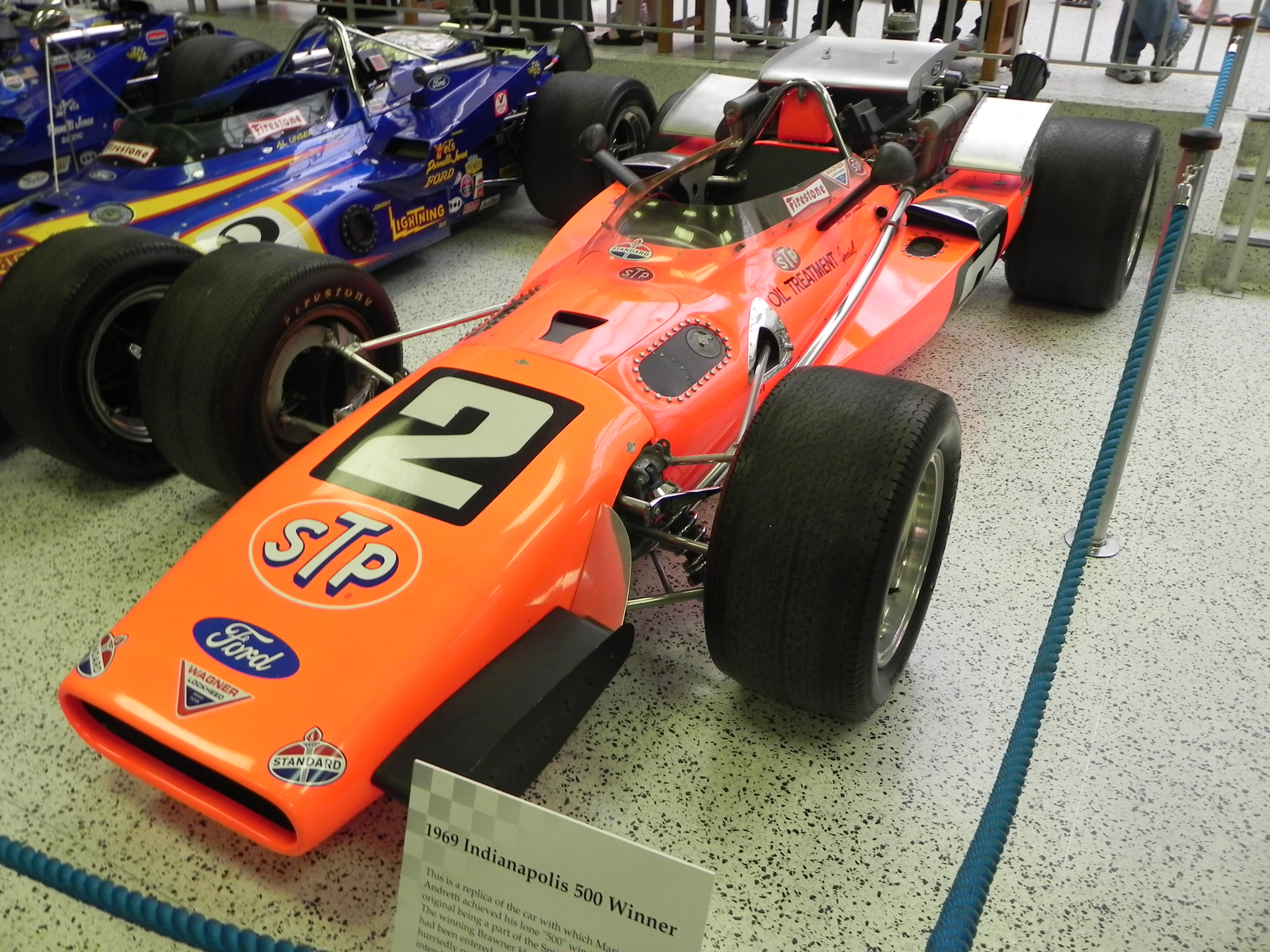
- Mario Andretti's Brawner Hawk, which he drove in winning the 1969 Indianapolis 500
- Category: U.S.A.C. IndyCar

Technical specifications
- Length: 160 in (4,064.0 mm)
- Width: 73 in (1,854.2 mm)
- Height: 37 in (939.8 mm)
- Engine: Ford 255 cu in (4.2 L) (1965-1970); 159 cu in (2.6 L) (1968-1970); 32-valve, DOHC V8, naturally-aspirated/turbocharged, mid-mounted
- Transmission: Halibrand 2-speed manual
- Weight: 1,400 lb (635.0 kg)

Competition history
- Debut: 1965 Indianapolis 500
Races	Wins	Podiums	Poles
62	25	43	25

The Brawner Hawk is a series of open-wheel race car chassis designed and developed by automotive mechanic and engineer Clint Brawner for U.S.A.C. Indy car racing, between 1965 and 1969. It won the 1969 Indianapolis 500, driven by Mario Andretti.

The Brawner Hawk was originally powered by the naturally-aspirated 255 cu in (4 L), and later turbocharged 159–162 cu in (2,606–2,655 cc), 700 hp (520 kW), Ford Indy V8 engine, which also powered several Lotus and Coyote Indy race cars, and even a McNamara chassis. The chassis was lightweight, and only weighed around 1,400 lb (640 kg), giving it an incredible power-to-weight ratio.
