= Grand Prix of Miami (open wheel racing) =

IndyCar Grand Prix event

The Grand Prix of Miami refers to an intermittent series of American open wheel races held in South Florida dating back to 1926. AAA held one board track race in 1926, and then the facility was destroyed by a hurricane. The popular CART IndyCar World Series debuted in the Miami area in the mid-1980s with a street circuit at Tamiami Park, then returned to race at Bicentennial Park in 1995.

From 1996 to 2010, Homestead-Miami Speedway hosted Indy cars on the 1.5-mile oval. The CART series participated from 1996 to 2000, then the event was switched to the Indy Racing League for 2001–2010. An additional Champ Car race was held for a brief time at Bayfront Park from 2002 to 2003.

== Fulford–Miami Speedway ==
Fulford–Miami Speedway
- Location: North Miami Beach, Florida, United States
- Broke ground: 1925
- Opened: 1926
- Closed: 1926
- Architect: Carl Fisher; Ray Harroun
- Major events: Carl G. Fisher Trophy

Oval
- Surface: Wood
- Length: 2.01 km (1.25 mi)
- Turns: 4
- Banking: 50°

In 1925, Carl Fisher (who built the Indianapolis Motor Speedway in 1909) was developing Miami Beach and envisioned the Miami area as the winter auto racing capital of the world. Fisher built Fulford–Miami Speedway, the world's fastest 1 1/4-mile board track in nearby Fulford. The outstanding features of the track were the 50 degree banked turns, which required a speed of at least 110 miles per hour (180 km/h) to keep the cars from sliding down into the infield.

On February 22, 1926, the first AAA Championship Car race in South Florida took place at the facility. A crowd of 20,000 spectators saw Peter DePaolo win the 300-mile (480-km) race, the first and only major race ever held at the facility.

Later in the year, the track was destroyed by the Great Miami Hurricane of 1926. The site of the oval is now occupied by the Diplomat Presidential Country Club.

=== Race winners ===
Date	Race name	Length	Type	Pole position	Winning driver
February 22	Carl G. Fisher Trophy	300 mi (480 km)	Board	(United States) Ralph Hepburn	(United States) Peter DePaolo

== Tamiami Park ==
Tamiami Park
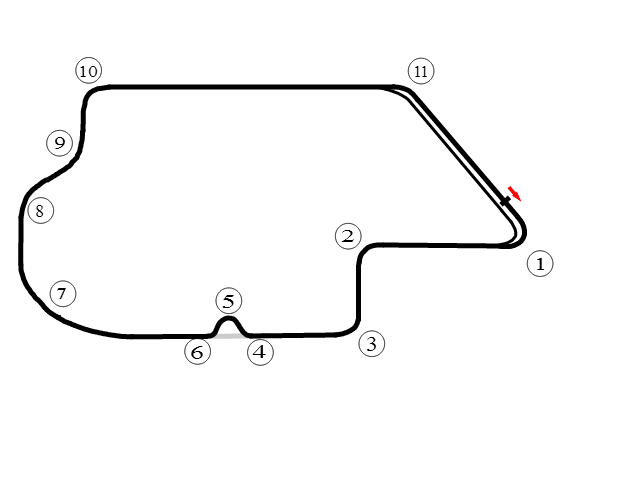
- Location: University Park, Florida, United States
- Opened: 1985
- Closed: 1988
- Surface: Asphalt/concrete
- Length: 1.783 mi (2.870 km)
- Turns: 10
- Race lap record: 0:55.062 (Danny Sullivan, Penske PC17-Chevrolet, 1987, IndyCar)

Modern American open wheel racing in the Miami area dates back to 1985. In that year, the CART series began racing on a temporary street circuit in Tamiami Park a small outdoor sports facility in the nearby suburb of University Park. The race lasted through 1988, and on two occasions (1987 and 1988) included the CART Marlboro Challenge all star race.

In each of the four years it was held, it served as the CART season finale. The inaugural event in 1985 featured a famous championship battle between the father-and-son duo of Al Unser, Sr. and Al Unser Jr. With Danny Sullivan leading in the waning laps, Unser Jr. was running third, and for the moment, mathematically was going to clinch the championship points title. His father Al Sr. was charging in 5th place, and needed to move up to 4th in order to clinch the title for himself and Penske Racing. Despite personal misgivings about potentially robbing his own son of a championship, Al Sr. passed 4th place Roberto Moreno with only a handful of laps remaining, and held on to the checkered flag. By finishing 4th, Unser, Sr. beat his son in the championship standings by one point.

Rain plagued the race three out of four years, and after the 1988 running, CART officials announced they were not returning. The primary reason was that CART wanted to change the date of the race to either September or to the spring. But promoter Ralph Sanchez did not want to move the race to September due to hurricane season, and did not want to move the race to the spring because it would create a conflict with the IMSA race he also promoted.

A significant portion of the course layout was razed for the construction of FIU Community Stadium in 1994. Some subtle remains of the circuit were recognizable as of the early 2010s.

=== Race winners ===
Season	Date	Race name	Winning driver	Chassis	Engine	Team
1985	November 10	Beatrice Indy Challenge	(United States) Danny Sullivan	March	Cosworth	Penske Racing
1986	November 9	Nissan Indy Challenge	(United States) Al Unser Jr.	Lola	Cosworth	Shierson Racing
1987	November 1	Nissan Indy Challenge	(United States) Michael Andretti	March	Cosworth	Kraco Racing
1988	November 6	Nissan Indy Challenge	(United States) Al Unser Jr.	March	Chevrolet	Galles Racing

==== Marlboro Challenge winners ====
Season	Date	Driver	Chassis	Engine	Team
1987	October 31	(United States) Bobby Rahal	Lola	Cosworth	Truesports
1988	November 5	(United States) Michael Andretti	Lola	Cosworth	Kraco Racing

==== American Racing Series (Indy Lights) history ====
Season	Date	Winning driver
1986	November 9	(Italy) Fabrizio Barbazza
1987	November 1	(United States) Jeff Andretti
1988	November 6	(Republic of Ireland) Tommy Byrne

== Museum Park ==
Museum Park
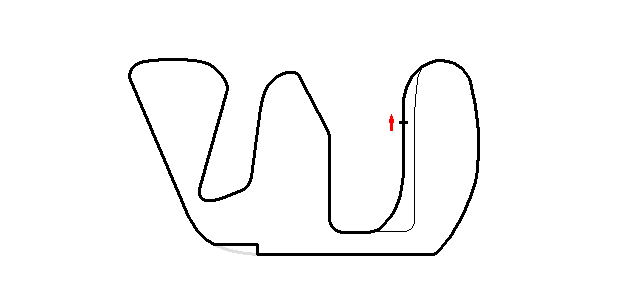
- Location: Miami, Florida, United States
- Opened: 1986 (first); 2015 (second)
- Closed: 1995 (first)
- Surface: Asphalt
- Length: 1.873 mi (3.014 km)
- Turns: 10
- Surface: Concrete
- Length: 1.348 mi (2.170 km)
- Turns: 8

In 1995, race promoter Ralph Sanchez brought open wheel racing back to Miami. In the aftermath of Hurricane Andrew, he began redeveloping a devastated area of Homestead, Florida, into the Homestead Motorsports Complex. From 1983 to 1994, Sanchez had promoted very successful IMSA and Trans-Am races at Bayfront Park and Bicentennial Park along Biscayne Bay.

Sanchez revived the Bicentennial Park circuit for one season as a CART race, while Homestead was still under construction. The Bicentennial Park circuit was a semi-permanent circuit which featured purpose-built roads in the park area, along with a temporary segment taking it out on Biscayne Boulevard near the entrance to the Port of Miami.

For the 1995 event, the circuit was run in the opposite direction (clockwise) as it had previously been contested (counter-clockwise). This was done mainly for safety reasons, as the faster Indy cars would find IMSA turn one too tight and prone to accidents. A small kink/chicane was added at the end of the long backstretch (now running northbound) to control speeds. Two of the turns were also widened and slightly re-worked, but that did not significantly alter the layout. The race was won by Jacques Villeneuve, and was the 1995 CART season opener.

Less than three years after the lone CART race in 1995, the layout of the Bicentennial Park racing circuit was partially razed for construction of American Airlines Arena. In the early 2010s, most of the remaining vestiges of the circuit were completely demolished due to the construction of the new Science Museum and Art Museum on the site.

This area was later used for a new circuit, known as the Biscayne Bay Street Circuit. Promoted by Michael Andretti, a 1.3 mile, eight-turn circuit in the area debuted for the 2014–15 Formula E season. In Formula E, the pit lane is used to store cars for the car change that takes place during each race, and the pit lane is away from the start-finish line, close to the pit lane. From Turn 4 to Turn 5 on this circuit the cars will take it out to Biscayne Boulevard, and Turns 5 to 8 (and pit lane) are located very close to the original Bicentennial Park circuit layout. The pit lane is in the same vicinity as the original circuit.

=== Race winners ===
Season	Date	Race name	Winning driver	Chassis	Engine	Team
1995	March 5	Marlboro Grand Prix of Miami	(Canada) Jacques Villeneuve	Reynard	Ford-Cosworth	Team Green
2015	March 14	Miami ePrix	(France) Nicolas Prost	Spark	Renault	e.dams

==== Indy Lights ====
Season	Date	Winning driver
1995	March 5	(Canada) Greg Moore

==== Atlantic Championship ====
Season	Date	Winning driver
1995	March 4	(Canada) Patrick Carpentier

== Homestead–Miami Speedway ==
Homestead–Miami Indy 300

IndyCar Series
- Venue: Homestead–Miami Speedway
- First race: 1996
- First ICS race: 2001
- Last race: 2010
- Distance: 300 miles (482.803 km)
- Laps: 200
- Previous names: CART Champ Car; Marlboro Grand Prix of Miami Presented by Toyota (1995–2000) IRL/IndyCar; Infiniti Grand Prix of Miami presented by 123.com Americatel (2001); 20th Anniversary Miami Grand Prix (2002); Toyota Indy 300 (2003–2005); Toyota Indy 300 Presented by XM Satellite Radio (2006); XM Satellite Radio Indy 300 (2007); GAINSCO Auto Insurance Indy 300 (2008); Firestone Indy 300 (2009); Cafés do Brasil Indy 300 (2010)

The Homestead–Miami Indy 300 was an IndyCar race held at Homestead-Miami Speedway in Homestead, Florida from 1996 to 2010.

In 1996, after construction was complete at Homestead Motorsports Complex, CART debuted at 1.5-mile oval with a 200-mile (320 km) event. At the time the layout was a flat, rectangular "mini-Indy" configuration. In 1997, the race was lengthened to 225 miles (362 km) after the turns were made wider by reducing the apron, and the configuration was finally reconstructed to be a traditional oval shape in 1998. For each of its years through 2000, the race served as the CART series season opener. CART also used the facility as their venue for "spring training" (off-season testing).

In 2001, the event switched to an IRL Indycar Series event. It was also lengthened to 300 miles (480 km). From 2002 to 2008, the race served as the IndyCar Series season opener. In 2007–2008, the race was held as a night race. After a schedule reorganization, the race was moved to become the season finale for 2009 and 2010 IndyCar Series season. The 2009 race went without a caution, and set a race record average speed of 201.420 mph. The 2010 race was the last IndyCar event at the track in the foreseeable future.

On March 26, 2006 driver Paul Dana suffered fatal injuries in the warmup session before the race when he was involved in a high-speed collision with Ed Carpenter at over 215 mph (346 km/h). The race went on as scheduled, but Dana's teammates withdrew from the race.

In 2002–2009, the IndyCar Series race was part of the Speed Jam, a twin-race combo weekend with the Rolex Sports Car Series.

=== Race winners ===
Season	Date	Driver	Team	Chassis	Engine	Race Distance		Race Time	Average Speed (mph)	Report
Season	Date	Driver	Team	Chassis	Engine	Laps	Miles (km)	Race Time	Average Speed (mph)	Report
CART PPG Indy Car World Series/FedEx Championship Series history
1996	March 3	(United States) Jimmy Vasser	Chip Ganassi Racing	Reynard	Honda	133	199.5 (321.064)	1:51:23	109.399	Report
1997	March 2	(United States) Michael Andretti	Newman/Haas Racing	Swift	Ford-Cosworth	147	220.5 (354.86)	1:38:45	135.478	Report
1998	March 15	(United States) Michael Andretti	Newman/Haas Racing	Swift	Ford-Cosworth	150	225 (362.102)	1:33:39	144.339	Report
1999	March 21	(Canada) Greg Moore	Forsythe Racing	Reynard	Mercedes	150	225 (362.102)	1:38:54	136.671	Report
2000	March 26	(Italy) Max Papis	Team Rahal	Reynard	Ford-Cosworth	150	225 (362.102)	1:22:01	164.788	Report
IRL IndyCar Series history
2001	April 8	(United States) Sam Hornish Jr.	Panther Racing	Dallara	Oldsmobile	200	300 (482.803)	2:01:12	148.508	Report
2002	March 2	(United States) Sam Hornish Jr.	Panther Racing	Dallara	Chevrolet	200	300 (482.803)	2:08:16	140.325	Report
2003	March 2	(New Zealand) Scott Dixon	Chip Ganassi Racing	G-Force	Toyota	200	300 (482.803)	1:57:06	153.71	Report
2004	February 29	(United States) Sam Hornish Jr.	Team Penske	Dallara	Toyota	200	300 (482.803)	1:57:56	151.094	Report
2005	March 6	(United Kingdom) Dan Wheldon	Andretti Green Racing	Dallara	Honda	200	300 (482.803)	2:05:28	142.033	Report
2006	March 26	(United Kingdom) Dan Wheldon	Chip Ganassi Racing	Dallara	Honda	200	300 (482.803)	1:46:14	167.73	Report
2007	March 24	(United Kingdom) Dan Wheldon	Chip Ganassi Racing	Dallara	Honda	200	300 (482.803)	1:48:07	164.825	Report
2008	March 29	(New Zealand) Scott Dixon	Chip Ganassi Racing	Dallara	Honda	200	300 (482.803)	1:44:04	171.248	Report
2009	October 10	(United Kingdom) Dario Franchitti	Chip Ganassi Racing	Dallara	Honda	200	300 (482.803)	1:28:28	201.42	Report
2010	October 2	(New Zealand) Scott Dixon	Chip Ganassi Racing	Dallara	Honda	200	300 (482.803)	1:52:09	158.905	Report

==== Indy Lights ====
Season	Date	Winning driver	Circuit
1996	March 3	(Canada) David Empringham	Oval
1997	March 2	(Canada) David Empringham	Oval
1998	March 15	(Japan) Shigeaki Hattori	Oval
1999	March 21	(Mexico) Mario Domínguez	Oval
2000	Not held		
2001	Not held		
2002	Not held		
2003	March 2	(United Kingdom) Mark Taylor	Oval
2004	February 29	(United States) Phil Giebler	Oval
2005	March 6	(United States) Travis Gregg	Oval
2006	March 26	(United States) Jeff Simmons	Oval
2007	March 24	(United Kingdom) Alex Lloyd	Oval
2008	March 29	(United Kingdom) Dillon Battistini	Oval
2009	October 9	(Brazil) Mario Romancini	Oval
2010	October 2	(United States) Brandon Wagner	Oval

==== Atlantic Championship ====
Season	Date	Winning driver	Circuit
1996	March 3	(United States) Tony Ave	1.4-mile (2.3 km) infield road course
1997	March 1	(United States) Anthony Lazzaro	Infield road course
1998	Not held		
1999	Not held		
2000	March 25	(United Kingdom) Dan Wheldon	Infield road course
2000	March 26	(United States) Buddy Rice	Infield road course

== Bayfront Park ==
Bayfront Park
- Location: Miami, Florida, United States
- Opened: 2002
- Closed: 2003
- Length: 1.15 mi (1.85 km)
- Turns: 13

The CART series returned to the Miami area once again in 2002. The Grand Prix Americas was a joint CART/ALMS weekend, which revived a part of the original 1983 Bayfront Park course. A 1.387-mile (2.232 km) circuit utilized park roads and extended onto Biscayne Boulevard and 3rd and 4th Streets. In 2003, the layout was changed to drop the 3rd/4th Street loop and added a section on Biscayne Boulevard along the north end of the park.

The race briefly provided two annual open wheel races in the Miami area. The IRL's race at Homestead was in the spring, while this race was held in the fall.

=== Race winners ===
Season	Date	Race name	Winning driver	Chassis	Engine	Team
2002	October 6	Grand Prix Americas	(Brazil) Cristiano da Matta	Lola	Toyota	Newman/Haas Racing
2003	September 28	Grand Prix Americas	(Mexico) Mario Domínguez	Lola	Ford Cosworth	Herdez Competition

==== Atlantic Championship ====
Season	Date	Winning driver
2003	September 28	(Canada) Michael Valiante

== See also ==
- Grand Prix of Miami (sports car racing)

== Notes ==
=== Works cited ===
- ChampCarStats.com
