= 1997 Indy Lights season =

- PPG/Firestone Indy Lights Championship

Season
- Races: 14
- Start date: March 2
- End date: September 27

Awards
- Drivers' champion: (Brazil) Tony Kanaan

The 1997 PPG/Firestone Indy Lights Championship Powered By Buick consisted of 13 races. Tony Kanaan edged out good friend and teammate Hélio Castro-Neves to the title by only four points.

This was the first season where all teams used the Lola T97/20-Buick spec car.

The scoring system was 20-16-14-12-10-8-6-5-4-3-2-1 points awarded to the first 12 (twelve) finishers, with 1 (one) extra point given to the driver who took pole-position, and another extra point given to the driver who led most laps in the race.

== Team and driver chart ==
The following drivers and teams competed in the series:

Team	No.	Drivers	Round(s)
Autosport Racing	5	(Canada) Eric Jensen	9
Autosport Racing	57	(France) Didier André	1–12
Autosport Racing	75	(France) Jean-Philippe Belloc	12
Bordin Racing	56	(Canada) Andrew Bordin	1–2, 6–12
Brian Stewart Racing	2	(Brazil) Airton Daré	All
Brian Stewart Racing	3	(Brazil) Cristiano da Matta	All
Brian Stewart Racing	34	(United States) Jaques Lazier	2–7
Brian Stewart Racing	34	(France) Frédéric Gosparini	9–13
Brian Stewart Racing	63	(United States) Brian Cunningham	1
Conquest Racing	21	(France) Christophe Tinseau	All
Dorricott Racing	31	(Brazil) Luiz Garcia Jr.	All
Dorricott Racing	32	(United States) Bob Dorricott Jr.	All
Eclipse Racing	20	(Canada) John Jones	1–4, 7–8
Eclipse Racing	20	(Canada) Claude Bourbonnais	9–12
FRE Racing	4	(Brazil) Sérgio Paese	1–2, 4–12
Forsythe Racing	33	(Canada) David Empringham	All
Forsythe Racing	99	(Canada) Lee Bentham	All
Genoa Racing	97	(Brazil) Oswaldo Negri Jr.	2, 4, 8–12
Indy Regency Racing	28	(Japan) Hideki Noda	1–12
Indy Regency Racing	77	(Mexico) Rodolfo Lavín	All
Johansson Motorsports	36	(Sweden) Fredrik Larsson	1–9
Johansson Motorsports	70	(United States) Jeff Ward	11–13
Leading Edge Motorsports	5	(United States) Chris Bingham	1–3, 8
Lucas Place Motorsports	5	(United States) Brian Cunningham	11–13
Lucas Place Motorsports	16	(Japan) Shigeaki Hattori	2–13
Lucas Place Motorsports	24	(United States) David DeSilva	All
PacWest Lights	18	(United States) Robby Unser	All
Project Indy	15	(Austria) Philipp Sager	1
Project Indy	15	(France) Frédéric Gosparini	2
Tasman Motorsports	7	(Brazil) Tony Kanaan	All
Tasman Motorsports	8	(Brazil) Hélio Castroneves	All
Team Green	25	(Japan) Naoki Hattori	All
Team Green	26	(United States) Chris Simmons	All
Team Green	27	(United States) Mark Hotchkis	All
Team Mears	10	(United States) Casey Mears	All
Team Mears	11	(United States) Clint Mears	All
Team Medlin	12	(United States) Geoff Boss	1–12

== Schedule ==
Rd.	Date	Track	Location
1	March 2	O Homestead-Miami Speedway	Homestead, Florida
2	April 13	R Long Beach Street Circuit	Long Beach, California
3	April 27	O Nazareth Speedway	Nazareth, Pennsylvania
4	May 18	R Grand Prize of America Road Course	Savannah, Georgia
5	May 24	O Gateway International Raceway	Madison, Illinois
6	June 1	O Milwaukee Mile	West Allis, Wisconsin
7	June 8	R The Raceway at Belle Isle Park	Detroit, Michigan
8	June 22	R Portland International Raceway	Portland, Oregon
9	July 20	R Exhibition Place	Toronto, Ontario
10	August 3	R Circuit Trois-Rivières	Trois-Rivières, Quebec
11	August 31	R Streets of Vancouver	Vancouver, British Columbia
12	September 7	R Laguna Seca Raceway	Monterey, California
13	September 27	O California Speedway	Fontana, California

== Race results ==
Round	Circuit	Pole position	Fastest lap	Most laps led	Race Winner	
Round	Circuit	Pole position	Fastest lap	Most laps led	Driver	Team
1	(United States) Homestead-Miami Speedway	(Brazil) Hélio Castroneves	(United States) Mark Hotchkis	(United States) Mark Hotchkis	(Canada) David Empringham	Forsythe Racing
2	(United States) Long Beach Street Circuit	(Brazil) Hélio Castroneves	(Brazil) Cristiano da Matta	(Brazil) Hélio Castroneves	(Brazil) Hélio Castroneves	Tasman Motorsports
3	(United States) Nazareth Speedway	(United States) Chris Simmons	(United States) David DeSilva	(United States) Chris Simmons	(Brazil) Cristiano da Matta	Brian Stewart Racing
4	(United States) Grand Prize of America Road Course	(Brazil) Hélio Castroneves	Not announced	(Brazil) Hélio Castroneves	(Brazil) Hélio Castroneves	Tasman Motorsports
5	(United States) Gateway International Raceway	(United States) Chris Simmons	(Brazil) Cristiano da Matta	(Canada) Lee Bentham	(Canada) Lee Bentham	Forsythe Racing
6	(United States) Milwaukee Mile	(United States) Clint Mears	(United States) Clint Mears	(United States) Clint Mears	(United States) Clint Mears	Team Mears
7	(United States) The Raceway at Belle Isle Park	(Brazil) Tony Kanaan	(Brazil) Hélio Castroneves	(Brazil) Tony Kanaan	(Brazil) Tony Kanaan	Tasman Motorsports
8	(United States) Portland International Raceway	(Brazil) Hélio Castroneves	(Brazil) Oswaldo Negri Jr.	(Brazil) Hélio Castroneves	(Japan) Hideki Noda	Indy Regency Racing
9	(Canada) Exhibition Place	(Brazil) Tony Kanaan	(France) Christophe Tinseau	(Brazil) Hélio Castroneves	(Brazil) Hélio Castroneves	Tasman Motorsports
10	(Canada) Circuit Trois-Rivières	(United States) Mark Hotchkis	(United States) Mark Hotchkis	(Brazil) Tony Kanaan	(Brazil) Tony Kanaan	Tasman Motorsports
11	(Canada) Streets of Vancouver	(Brazil) Cristiano da Matta	(Japan) Hideki Noda	(Brazil) Cristiano da Matta	(Brazil) Cristiano da Matta	Brian Stewart Racing
12	(United States) Laguna Seca Raceway	(Brazil) Tony Kanaan	(Brazil) Cristiano da Matta	(Brazil) Cristiano da Matta	(Brazil) Cristiano da Matta	Brian Stewart Racing
13	(United States) California Speedway	(United States) Clint Mears	(Brazil) Cristiano da Matta	(Brazil) Hélio Castroneves	(United States) Clint Mears	Team Mears

== Championship standings ==
=== Drivers' championship ===
Scoring system

Position	**1st**	**2nd**	**3rd**	**4th**	**5th**	**6th**	**7th**	**8th**	**9th**	**10th**	**11th**	**12th**
Points	20	16	14	12	10	8	6	5	4	3	2	1

- The driver who qualifies on pole is awarded one additional point.
- An additional point is awarded to the driver who leads the most laps in a race.

Pos	Driver	HMS (United States)	LBH (United States)	NAZ (United States)	SAV (United States)	GAT (United States)	MIL (United States)	DET (United States)	POR (United States)	TOR (Canada)	TRO (Canada)	VAN (Canada)	LAG (United States)	FON (United States)	Points
1	(Brazil) Tony Kanaan	6	5	5	23	10	3	**1***	3	**2**	1*	2	**2**	9	156
2	(Brazil) Hélio Castroneves	**14**	**1***	4	**1***	3	12	2	**2***	1*	20	19	3	5*	152
3	(Brazil) Cristiano da Matta	21	2	1	21	2	4	26	5	18	4	**1***	1*	4	141
4	(Canada) David Empringham	1	10	9	14	4	2	4	7	3	5	5	26	13	107
5	(Canada) Lee Bentham	5	14	22	3	1*	9	22	8	27	8	8	5	3	88
6	(United States) Chris Simmons	3	4	**2***	16	**5**	17	8	13	21	15	4	28	2	88
7	(United States) Mark Hotchkis	4*	3	23	17	22	7	6	16	17	**2**	11	4	11	74
8	(United States) Clint Mears	12	18	7	18	11	**1***	18	DNS	13	12	14	DNS	**1**	53
9	(Japan) Hideki Noda	18	19	16	6	16	14	14	1	15	6	3	12		51
10	(Brazil) Airton Daré	11	6	8	8	6	11	13	20	9	9	7	11	8	51
11	(France) Christophe Tinseau	25	26	14	12	12	21	11	4	5	3	18	6	12	49
12	(Sweden) Fredrik Larsson	2	22	3	10	24	5	25	22	28					43
13	(Brazil) Luiz Garcia Jr.	16	15	24	4	17	19	9	6	25	23	6	10	10	38
14	(France) Didier André	22	8	25	9	20	18	21	25	4	7	10	8		35
15	(United States) Robby Unser	8	7	10	22	7	6	12	14	7	19	21	22	16	35
16	(Japan) Naoki Hattori	13	DNS	15	5	14	13	7	24	6	24	15	20	6	32
17	(United States) Geoff Boss	10	24	17	20	21	20	3	10	14	11	9	9		30
18	(Brazil) Sérgio Paese	DNS	20		2	18	24	5	12	23	25	27	13		27
19	(United States) David DeSilva	17	12	6	DNQ	8	25	10	26	24	26	17	17		17
20	(Brazil) Oswaldo Negri Jr.		27		7				9	8	21	20	27		15
21	(United States) Brian Cunningham	7										25	7	14	12
22	(United States) Jaques Lazier		11	12	24	9	8	23							12
23	(United States) Casey Mears	9	17	13	13	13	10	25	11	20	17	16	19	15	9
24	(United States) Jeff Ward											22	15	7	6
25	(Japan) Shigeaki Hattori		9	20	15	23	16	24	23	26	14	12	14	18	5
26	(France) Frédéric Gosparini		DNS							12	10	24	23	19	4
27	(United States) Bob Dorricott Jr.	24	21	18	11	19	23	16	15	11	16	13	21	20	4
28	(Canada) Andrew Bordin	23	23				15	17	17	10	13	23	16		3
29	(United States) Chris Bingham	15	13	11					21						2
30	(Mexico) Rodolfo Lavín	20	16	21	25	15	22	19	19	22	22	26	25	17	0
31	(Canada) Eric Jensen									16					0
32	(Canada) Claude Bourbonnais									19	18	28	18		0
33	(Canada) John Jones	19	25	19	19			20	18						0
34	(France) Jean-Philippe Belloc												24		0
35	(Austria) Philipp Sager	DNS													0
Pos	Driver	HMS (United States)	LBH (United States)	NAZ (United States)	SAV (United States)	GAT (United States)	MIL (United States)	DET (United States)	POR (United States)	TOR (Canada)	TRO (Canada)	VAN (Canada)	LAG (United States)	FON (United States)	Points

Color	Result
Gold	Winner
Silver	2nd place
Bronze	3rd place
Green	4th & 5th place
Light Blue	6th–10th place
Dark Blue	Finished (Outside Top 10)
Purple	Did not finish
Red	Did not qualify (DNQ)
Brown	Withdrawn (Wth)
Black	Disqualified (DSQ)
White	Did not start (DNS)
Blank	Did not participate (DNP)
Blank	Not competing

**In-line notation**
**Bold**	Pole position(1 point)
Italics	Ran fastest race lap
*	Led most race laps (2 points)
^{1}	Qualifying cancelled no bonus point awarded

- Ties in points broken by number of wins, or best finishes.
