= Firestone Indy 225 =

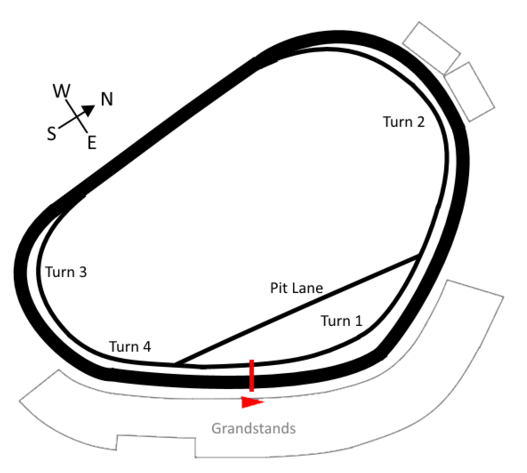

IndyCar Series
- Venue: Nazareth Speedway
- Corporate sponsor: Firestone
- First race: 1987
- First ICS race: 2002
- Last race: 2004
- Distance: 225 miles (362 km)
- Laps: 225
- Previous names: Nazareth 100 (1968–1969, 1982); Bosch Spark Plug Grand Prix (1987–1996); Bosch Spark Plug Grand Prix Presented by Toyota (1997–2000); Lehigh Valley Grand Prix (2001); Firestone Indy 225 (2002–2004)
- Most wins (driver): Emerson Fittipaldi (3)
- Most wins (team): Penske Racing (7)

The Firestone Indy 225 was an IndyCar racing event held at Nazareth Speedway from 1987–2004. From 1987–2001, the event was sanctioned by CART. In 2002, the race switched to the Indy Racing League. From 1987–1996, the race was scheduled for 200 laps. In 1997, the race was lengthened to 225 laps. Rising speeds had led to the races being completed very quickly, and CART officials worried that the fans were not getting their money's worth. The race was discontinued after the track closed permanently in 2004.

Nazareth also hosted the Marlboro Challenge all-star event in 1990 and 1992. IndyCar points racing would not return in Pennsylvania until their return to Pocono Raceway in 2013 for the first time since 1989.

== Past winners ==
Season	Date	Driver	Team	Chassis	Engine	Race Distance		Race Time	Average Speed (mph)	Report
Season	Date	Driver	Team	Chassis	Engine	Laps	Miles (km)	Race Time	Average Speed (mph)	Report
USAC Champ Car history
1968	July 13	(United States) Al Unser		Dunlop	Offy	100	100 (160.934)	1:00:21	100.068	Report
1969	July 12	(United States) Mario Andretti		Kuzma	Offy	100	100 (160.934)	0:56:45	105.719	Report
1982	Dec 4	(United States) Keith Kauffman		Gambler	Chevrolet	54*	54 (86.904)			Report
CART Champ Car history
1987	Sept 20	(United States) Michael Andretti	Kraco Enterprises	March	Cosworth	200	200 (321.868)	1:33:02	129.026	Report
1988	Sept 25	(United States) Danny Sullivan	Penske Racing	Penske	Chevrolet-Ilmor	200	200 (321.868)	1:20:47	148.526	Report
1989	Sept 24	(Brazil) Emerson Fittipaldi	Patrick Racing	Penske	Chevrolet-Ilmor	200	200 (321.868)	1:29:02	134.767	Report
1990	Oct 7	(Brazil) Emerson Fittipaldi	Penske Racing	Penske	Chevrolet-Ilmor	200	200 (321.868)	1:46:28	112.17	Report
1991	Oct 6	(Netherlands) Arie Luyendyk	Granatelli Racing Team	Lola	Chevrolet-Ilmor	200	200 (321.868)	1:31:23	131.31	Report
1992	Oct 4	(United States) Bobby Rahal	Rahal/Hogan Racing	Lola	Chevrolet-Ilmor	200	200 (321.868)	1:33:07	128.848	Report
1993	Sept 19	(United Kingdom) Nigel Mansell	Newman/Haas Racing	Lola	Ford-Cosworth	200	200 (321.868)	1:15:37	158.686	Report
1994	Sept 18	(Canada) Paul Tracy	Penske Racing	Penske	Ilmor	200	200 (321.868)	1:31:30	131.141	Report
1995	April 23	(Brazil) Emerson Fittipaldi	Penske Racing	Penske	Mercedes-Benz-Ilmor	200	200 (321.868)	1:31:23	131.305	Report
1996	April 28	(United States) Michael Andretti	Newman/Haas Racing	Lola	Ford-Cosworth	200	200 (321.868)	1:25:08	140.953	Report
1997	April 27	(Canada) Paul Tracy	Penske Racing	Penske	Mercedes-Benz-Ilmor	225	225 (362.102)	1:53:31	118.919	Report
1998	April 26	(United States) Jimmy Vasser	Chip Ganassi Racing	Reynard	Honda	225	225 (362.102)	1:57:20	108.839	Report
1999	May 2	(Colombia) Juan Pablo Montoya	Chip Ganassi Racing	Reynard	Honda	225	225 (362.102)	1:46:13	120.225	Report
2000	May 27*	(Brazil) Gil de Ferran	Penske Racing	Reynard	Honda	225	225 (362.102)	2:06:10	101.219	Report
2001	May 6	(New Zealand) Scott Dixon	PacWest Racing	Reynard	Toyota	225	225 (362.102)	1:51:12	114.84	Report
IRL IndyCar Series history
2002	April 21	(United States) Scott Sharp	Kelley Racing	Dallara	Chevrolet	225	225 (362.102)	2:14:35	93.789	Report
2003	Aug 24	(Brazil) Hélio Castroneves	Team Penske	Dallara	Toyota	225	225 (362.102)	1:42:07	123.606	Report
2004	Aug 29	(United Kingdom) Dan Wheldon	Andretti Green Racing	Dallara	Honda	225	225 (362.102)	1:46:11	118.874	Report

- 1982: Race shortened due to rain.
- 2000: Originally scheduled for April 9; postponed due to snow.

== Lights and Atlantics winners ==
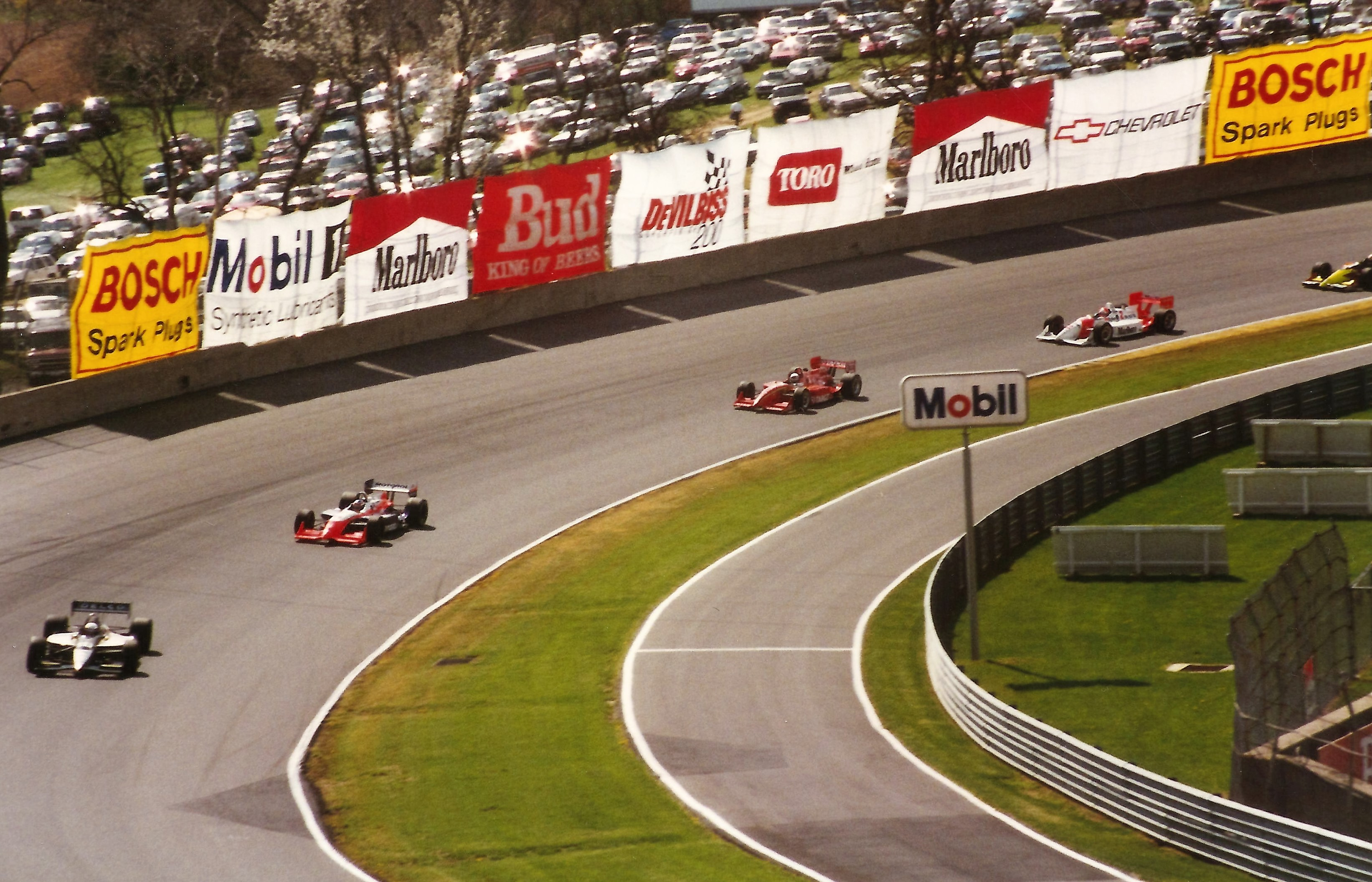
Race action during the 1997 event.

Season	Date	Winning driver	Season	Date	Winning driver
CART Indy Lights			SCCA and CART Atlantic Championship		
1987	September 20	(United States) Mike Groff			
1988	September 25	(United Kingdom) Calvin Fish			
1989	September 24	(United States) Mike Groff			
1990	October 7	(United States) Robbie Groff			
1991	October 6	(United States) Robbie Buhl	1991	October 6	(Philippines) Jovy Marcelo
1992	October 4	(United States) Robbie Buhl	1992	October 3	(Norway) Harald Huysman
1993	September 19	(United States) Bryan Herta	1993	September 18	(Canada) Claude Bourbonnais
1994	September 18	(Canada) Greg Moore	1994	September 17	(United States) Mark Dismore
1995	April 23	(Canada) Greg Moore	1995	April 22	(Canada) Patrick Carpentier
1996	April 28	(United States) David DeSilva	1996	April 27	(Canada) Patrick Carpentier
1997	April 27	(Brazil) Cristiano da Matta	1997	April 26	(United States) Alex Barron
1998	April 27	(Brazil) Cristiano da Matta	1998	April 25	(United States) Buddy Rice
1999	May 2	(Brazil) Airton Daré	1999	May 1	(United States) Anthony Lazzaro
2000*	No race		2000*	No race	
			2001	May 5	(United States) Tony Ave

- 2000: Originally scheduled for April 9, postponed due to snow. Indy Lights and Atlantic races were not made up.
