= Fogarty =

- Pronunciation: /ˈfoʊɡərti/
- Language: English

Origin
- Language: Irish
- Origin: Ó Fógartaigh
- Derivation: fógartha
- Meaning: 'descendant of the banished'
- Region of origin: County Tipperary

Fogarty is a surname of Irish origin. The name Fogarty in Ireland is derived from the native Irish Ó Fogartaigh sept who ruled Éile Uí Fhogartaigh, now located in County Tipperary where the name is still common. The barony of Eliogarty that still exists was named after Éile Uí Fhogartaigh.

According to historian C. Thomas Cairney, the O'Fogartys were one of the chiefly families of the Dal gCais or Dalcassians who were a tribe of the Erainn who were the second wave of Celts to settle in Ireland between about 500 and 100 BC.

This name, with variant spellings (O) Fogerty, Foggarty, Fogaty, Gogarty and Go(g)erty, is an Anglicised form of the old Irish "Ó Fogartaigh". The Irish prefix "Ó" indicates "male descendant of", plus the personal byname "Fogartach" meaning "banished" or "exiled". The Fogartys are of the ancient population group, Dál gCais, otherwise known as the Dalcassians, who inhabited County Clare with adjacent parts of counties Limerick and Tipperary. Eliogarty, the name of a barony in Co. Tipperary, locates the sept and indicates their importance. The majority of present-day namebearers are found in County Tipperary, and Malachy O' Fogarty, of the University of Paris, who flourished in 1700, was born at Castle Fogarty in that county. Another notable namebearer was Archbishop Fogarty (1858–1955), who for fifty-one years was Bishop of Killaloe.

A Coat of Arms granted to the family depicts two gold lions rampant on a blue shield supporting a gold sheaf of corn, the latter denoting plenty and the Harvest of One's Hopes. The first recorded spelling of the family name is shown to be that of O' Fogarty, King of Ely, County Tipperary, which was dated 1072, "The Annals of Ulster", during the reign of High King of Ireland, "with opposition", 1022–1166.

Notable people with the surname include:

== Sportspeople ==
- Aidan Fogarty (Offaly hurler) (born 1958), Irish hurler
- Aidan Fogarty (Kilkenny hurler) (born 1982), Irish hurler
- Alan Fogarty, Irish water polo player
- Amby Fogarty (1933–2016), Irish football player
- Bryan Fogarty (1969–2002), Canadian ice hockey player
- Carl Fogarty (born 1965), British World Superbike racer
- Chris Fogarty (1884–1915), Australian football player
- Conor Fogarty (born 1990), Irish hurler
- Damien Fogarty (born 1985), Irish hurler
- Darcy Fogarty (born 1999), Australian rules footballer
- Denis Fogarty (born 1983), Irish rugby player
- Jamal Fogarty (born 1993), Australian rugby league player
- Jim Fogarty (1864–1891), US baseball player
- Joe Fogarty (1885–1954), Australian football player
- John Fogarty (Australian rugby player) (1927–2007), Australian rugby player
- John Fogarty (rugby union, born 1977), Irish rugby union coach and former player
- John Fogarty (disambiguation), several sportspeople
- Jon Fogarty (born 1975), American auto racing driver
- Ken Fogarty (born 1955), English football coach
- Lyndsie Fogarty (born 1984), Australian sprint canoeist
- Martin Fogarty, Irish hurler
- Richard Fogarty (1891–1980), New Zealand rugby player
- Tom Fogarty (1878–1922), Australian football player
- Tom Fogarty (hurler) (born 1952), Irish hurling manager

== Politicians ==
- Andrew Fogarty (1879–1953), Irish politician
- Charles J. Fogarty (born 1955), former Lieutenant Governor of Rhode Island
- Gerry Fogarty, Canadian politician
- John E. Fogarty (1913–67) US Congressman
- Kathleen Fogarty (born 1965), American politician
- Kenneth Fogarty (1923–1989), Canadian politician
- Patrick Fogarty (died 1947), Irish politician
- Ray Fogarty (1957–2018), American politician
- William "Bill" Fogarty (1922–2001), Australian politician

== Other people ==
- Anne Fogarty (1919–1980), American fashion designer
- Brian Fogarty, English novelist, short story writer, poet, painter, and printmaker.
- Edward Stephen Fogarty Fegen (1891–1940), Victoria Cross recipient
- Francis Fogarty (1899–1973), Air Chief Marshal of the Royal Air Force
- Frank Fogarty (1887–1978), American cartoonist
- Frank Joseph Fogarty (1878–1925), vaudeville actor, comedian and singer
- James Fogarty (born 1978), British music producer
- Joyce Growing Thunder Fogarty (born 1950), Assiniboine-Sioux textile beadworker
- Juanita Growing Thunder Fogarty (born 1969), Assiniboine-Sioux textile artist
- Lionel Fogarty (1958–2026), Indigenous Australian poet and political activist
- Mignon Fogarty (born 1967), podcaster and former science writer
- Nelson Wellesley Fogarty (1871–1933), first Anglican Bishop of Damaraland (Namibia)
- Pat Fogarty (1940–1999), South African-born, UK-based illustrator
- Shelagh Fogarty (born 1966), British radio and television presenter and journalist
- Thomas J. Fogarty (1934–2025), American surgeon and medical device inventor

== See also ==
- Fogerty
- Éile
- Irish clans
