= John Fogarty =

John or Jon Fogarty may refer to:

== Sportsmen ==
- John Fogarty (baseball) (1864–1918), American baseball player
- John Fogarty (footballer, born 1882) (1882–1956), Australian rules footballer for South Melbourne
- John Fogarty (footballer, born 1942) (1942–2011), Australian rules footballer
- John Fogarty (rugby union, born 1927) (1927–2007), Australian rugby league and union player
- John Fogarty (rugby union, born 1977), Irish rugby union player
- Jon Fogarty (born 1975), racing driver
- Jon Fogarty (footballer) (born 1960), Australian rules footballer for Swan Districts

== Other ==
- John Fogarty (Australian politician) (1848–1904), MP and mayor
- John Fogarty (judge) (1947–2022), New Zealand lawyer and judge
- John Fogarty (priest) (born 1952), Irish Catholic priest
- John E. Fogarty (1913–1967), American congressman

== See also ==
- John Fogerty (disambiguation)
- Fogarty
- Fogerty
