= Eric Jensen (racing driver) =

Eric Jensen (born February 1, 1970) is a Canadian professional race team owner and a former professional race car driver from Toronto, Ontario, Canada.

As a driver, Jensen competed in the Atlantic Championship and Firestone Indy Lights series during a 13-year career from 1997 to 2009.

Jensen currently owns the professional car racing team Jensen MotorSport.

Jensen MotorSport continues to operate race cars in several professional race series. In 2011, Jensen MotorSport operated race cars in the Firestone Indy Lights which is a race series that runs together with IndyCar. The team operated three cars during the 2011 season for drivers Oliver Webb, David Ostella, and Juan Pablo Garcia. The team scored a season best result of 3rd at the Edmonton Indy and set a lap record for Indy Lights at Indianapolis Motor Speedway.

Jensen MotorSport competed in the Atlantic Championship for eleven years from 1999 until 2009. Eric Jensen won the Team Owner of the Year award in the final season of the series in 2009. Jensen drivers in 2009 included Markus Niemela and Matt Lee. Henri Karjalainen drove for the team in 2008.

Under Champ Car sanction, in the 2007 season Jensen operated race cars in the Champ Car Atlantic series for drivers Frankie Muniz, Tom Sutherland, and Dominick Muermans. In 2006, the team operated race cars in the Champ Car Atlantic series for drivers Tim Bridgman and Steve Ott. Jensen MotorSport also operated race cars for Frankie Muniz and Tom Sutherland in the Formula BMW USA championship.

== Motorsports career results ==
=== American Open-Wheel racing results ===
(key)

=== Indy Lights ===
(key)

Year	Team	1	2	3	4	5	6	7	8	9	10	11	12	13	14	Rank	Points	Ref
1997	Autosport Racing	MIA	LBH	NAZ	SAV	STL	MIL	DET	POR	TOR; 16	TRO	VAN	LS	FON		31st	0	
1998	Genoa Racing	MIA	LBH; 17	NAZ	STL	MIL	DET	POR	CLE	TOR	MIS	TRO	VAN	LS	FON	31st	0	
2011	Jensen MotorSport	STP	ALA	LBH	INDY	MIL	IOW	TOR; DNQ	EDM1	EDM2	TRO	NHM	BAL	KTY	LVS	-	-	

=== Atlantic Championship ===
Year	Team	1	2	3	4	5	6	7	8	9	10	11	12	13	Rank	Points
1997	Binder Racing	HMS	LBH	NAZ	MIL	MTL; 31	CLE	TOR	TRR	MOH	ROA	VAN	LS		NR	0
1998	World Speed Motorsports	LBH	NAZ	GAT	MIL	MTL; DNS	CLE	TOR; 26	TRR; 26	MOH	ROA	VAN; 16	LS	HOU	NR	0
1999	Jensen MotorSport	LBH; 15	NAZ	GAT	MIL	MTL; 17	ROA	TRR; 16	MOH	CHI	VAN	LS	HOU		32nd	0
2000	Jensen MotorSport	HMS1	HMS2	LBH; 18	MIL	MTL; 21	CLE	TOR; 16	TRR	ROA; 22	LS; 20	GAT	HOU; 15		33rd	0
2001	Jensen MotorSport	LBH; 16	NAZ	MIL	MTL; 19	CLE	TOR; 18	CHI	TRR	ROA	VAN	HOU	LS		33rd	0
2002	Jensen MotorSport	MTY	LBH	MIL	LS	POR	CHI	TOR; 17	CLE	TRR; 19	ROA	MTL; 19	DEN; 20		34rd	0
2003	Jensen MotorSport	MTY; 12	LBH; 11	MIL	LS; 9	POR; 14	CLE; 8	TOR; 13	TRR; 11	MOH; 13	MTL; 14	DEN; 12	MIA; 10		12th	49
2004	Jensen MotorSport	LBH; 20	MTY	MIL	POR1	POR2	CLE; 11	TOR; 10	VAN; 8	ROA; 10	DEN; 11	MTL	LS		15th	71
2005	Jensen MotorSport	LBH	MTY	POR1	POR2	CLE1	CLE2	TOR; 5	EDM; 7	SJO	DEN	ROA	MTL; 8		14th	54
2008	Jensen MotorSport	LBH	LS	MTT	EDM1	EDM2	ROA1	ROA2	TRR; 15	NJ; 18	UTA	ATL			25th	9
2009	Jensen MotorSport	SEB	UTA	NJ1	NJ2	LIM	ACC1	ACC2; 10	MOH	TRR; 8	MOS; 9	ATL	LS		12th	16
