= Joey Hand =

American racing driver (born 1979)

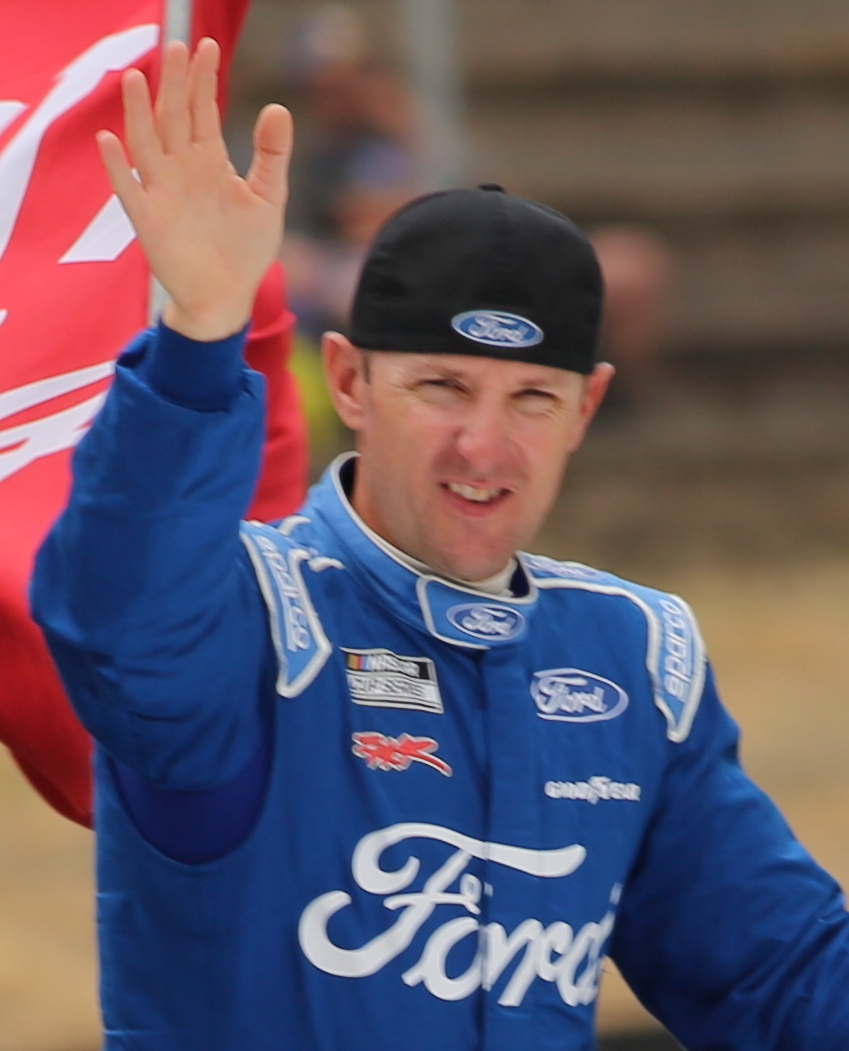
- Hand at Sonoma Raceway in 2022
- Nationality: (United States) American
- Born: Joseph Alan Hand; February 10, 1979 (age 47) Sacramento, California, U.S.

DTM career
- Debut season: 2012
- Current team: BMW Team RBM
- Categorisation: FIA Platinum (until 2021); FIA Gold (2022–)
- Car number: 4
- Former teams: BMW Team RMG
- Starts: 27
- Championships: 0
- Wins: 0
- Poles: 0
- Fastest laps: 1
- Best finish: 12th in 2013
- Finished last season: 12th (32 pts)

Previous series
- 2006–2013 2004 2001–2004 2000 1998–1999 2004–2013: American LeMans Series; Formula BMW USA; Toyota Atlantic; Formula Palmer Audi; Star Mazda; Grand-Am

Championship titles
- 1999 2011: Star Mazda Series; American Le Mans Series GT

Awards
- 2017 2011 2011 2012 2001 2000 1998: 24 Hours of Daytona GTLM winner 24 Hours of Daytona DP winner 12 Hours of Sebring GT winner 12 Hours of Sebring GT winner Toyota Atlantic Rookie of the Year; Team USA Scholarship; Star Mazda Rookie of the Year
24 Hours of Le Mans career
- Years: 2011, 2016
- Teams: BMW Motorsport, Ford Chip Ganassi Racing
- Best finish: 1st in GTE Pro (2016)
- Class wins: 1

NASCAR Cup Series career
- 8 races run over 3 years
- 2024 position: 39th
- Best finish: 34th (2022)
- First race: 2021 Bank of America Roval 400 (Charlotte Roval)
- Last race: 2024 Grant Park 165 (Chicago)
Wins	Top tens	Poles
0	1	0

NASCAR O'Reilly Auto Parts Series career
- 1 race run over 1 year
- 2025 position: 60th
- Best finish: 60th (2025)
- First race: 2025 Pacific Office Automation 147 (Portland)
Wins	Top tens	Poles
0	0	0
- Statistics up to date as of December 25, 2024.

Joseph Alan Hand (born February 10, 1979) is an American professional racing driver who competes in sports car racing as a Ford factory driver. A former champion of the Star Mazda Series, Hand is the co-winner of the 2011 24 Hours of Daytona driving for Chip Ganassi Racing, the 2012 12 Hours of Sebring GT class for BMW Team Rahal, and the 2016 24 Hours of Le Mans LMGTE Pro class for Ford Chip Ganassi Team USA driving the Ford GT.

== Racing career ==
=== Early career ===
Hand began his career in kart racing, starting at age 12. Moving up to the Star Mazda Series in 1998, Hand won nine races in the series, winning the rookie of the year award in 1998 and the series championship in 1999.

Following an injury that sidelined him for most of the 2000 season, Hand moved up to the Toyota Atlantic series in 2001, scoring two wins in three years spent in the series, with a best championship finish of third in 2001.

=== Grand-Am, ALMS and IMSA ===
Beginning with the 2004 season, Hand has raced in the Grand American Road Racing Association's Rolex Sports Car Series, racing in both the Grand Touring and Daytona Prototype classes, winning five times in the GT category while driving BMWs. Hand has also raced sporadically in the American LeMans Series; in 2006, Hand was involved in a spectacular end-over-end crash at the Mid-Ohio Sports Car Course, while in 2009, he won the first pole position for a BMW in eight years in the ALMS at Road America.

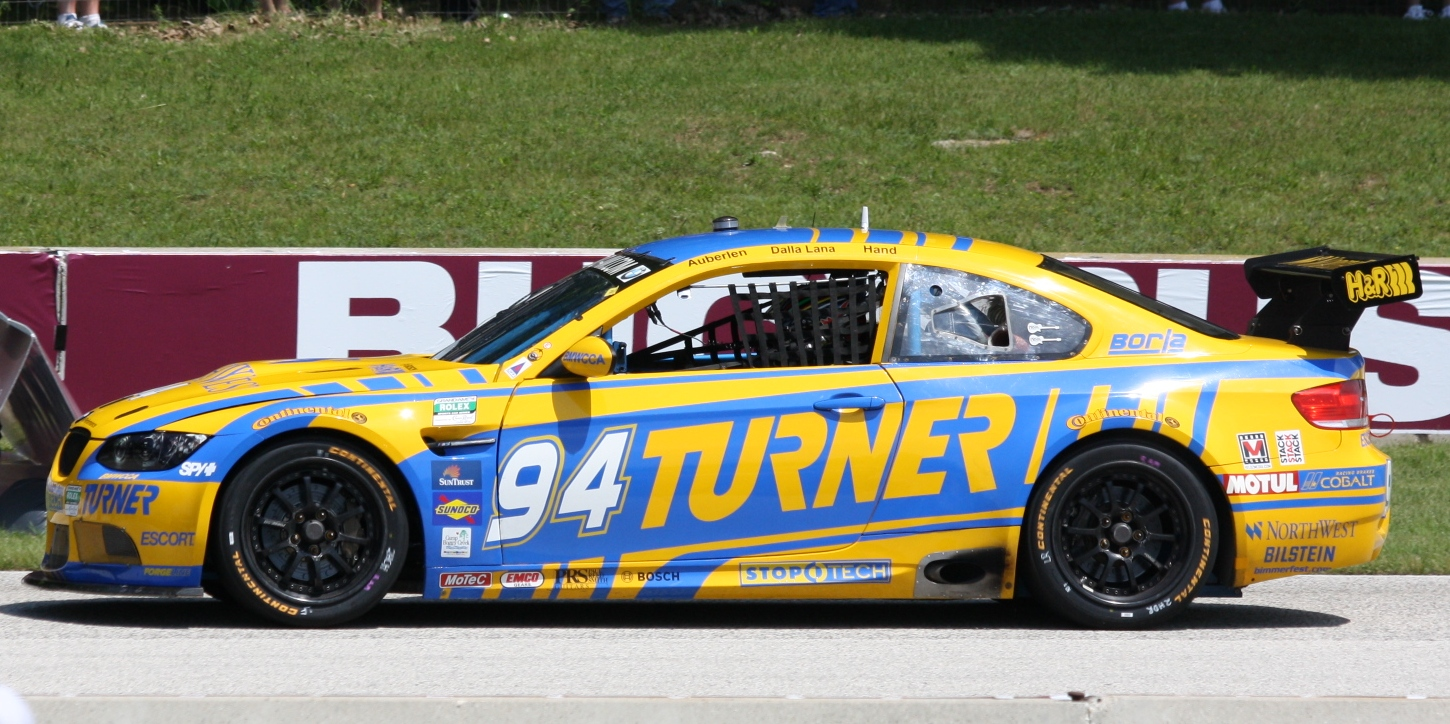
Hand's 2011 BMW for Turner Motorsport

Driving for Chip Ganassi Racing, Hand, along with co-drivers Scott Pruett, Memo Rojas and Graham Rahal, won the 2011 Rolex 24 Hours of Daytona endurance race at Daytona International Speedway, driving the #01 Riley-BMW Daytona Prototype. The team was set back by a pit road penalty while Hand was driving; however, he was able to recover, and co-driver Pruett took the car to victory. The following month, the BMW Motorsport team he drove for won the GT class of the 2011 12 Hours of Sebring. Later, he joined the BMW Motorsport factory team at the 24 Hours of Le Mans, where he finished third in the GTE-Pro class driving again a BMW M3. Also in 2011, Hand competed full-time in the Grand-Am Sports Car Challenge for Turner, finishing runner-up with Michael Marsal as a teammate.

Hand returned to BMW Rahal for the 2012 American Le Mans Series season. He again won the GT class at the 12 Hours of Sebring and took three podiums out of seven appearances. Meanwhile, he finished sixth overall at the 24 Hours of Daytona driving a Ganassi BMW.

In the 2013 ALMS season, Hand got a second-place class finish and two-fourths out of six appearances for BMW Rahal with a BMW Z4 de Rahal. Again, he raced for Ganassi at the 24 Hours of Daytona and later the Brickyard Grand Prix at Indianapolis.

As the new United SportsCar Championship launched in 2014, Hand finished second in the GTLM class at the 24 Hours of Daytona and third at the 12 Hours of Sebring for BMW Rahal.

In 2016, Hand joined the Ford factory program for the 2016 WeatherTech SportsCar Championship and the 24 Hours of Le Mans. He was reunited with teammate Dirk Müller, while Sébastien Bourdais joined the team for the endurance races, including Le Mans. Hand, Müller, and Bourdais went on to win the 2016 24 Hours of Le Mans in the LMGTE Pro category while driving the 2017 Ford GT LME GTE-Pro.

=== Other racing ===
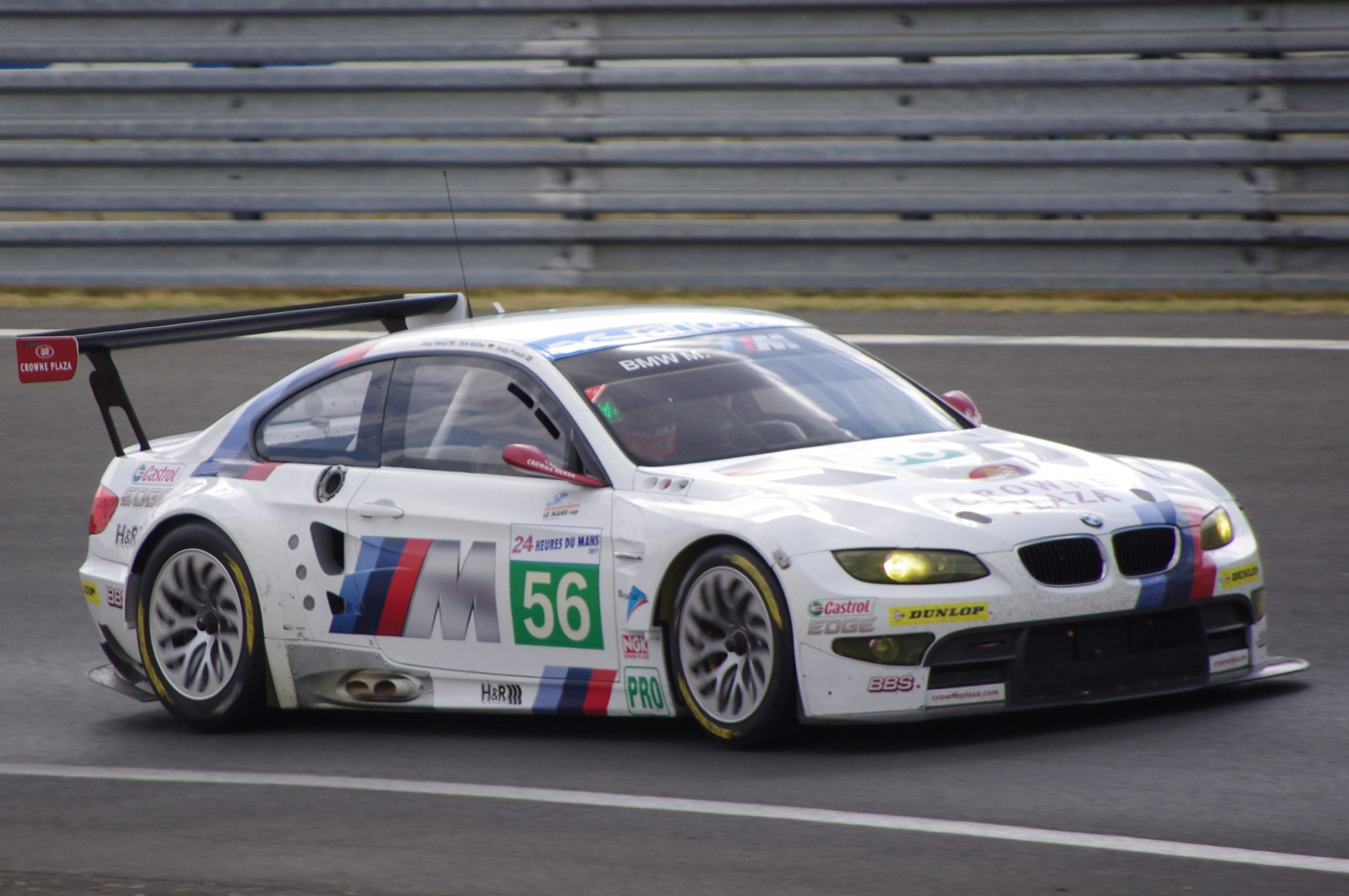
Hand's 2011 24 Hours of Le Mans car

On October 22, 2011, Hand made his debut in the International V8 Supercars Championship, driving for Dick Johnson Racing in the Gold Coast 600. finishing fourth with co-driver James Moffat In November, he drove a DTM car for the first time, testing for BMW at Circuito Monteblanco in Spain.

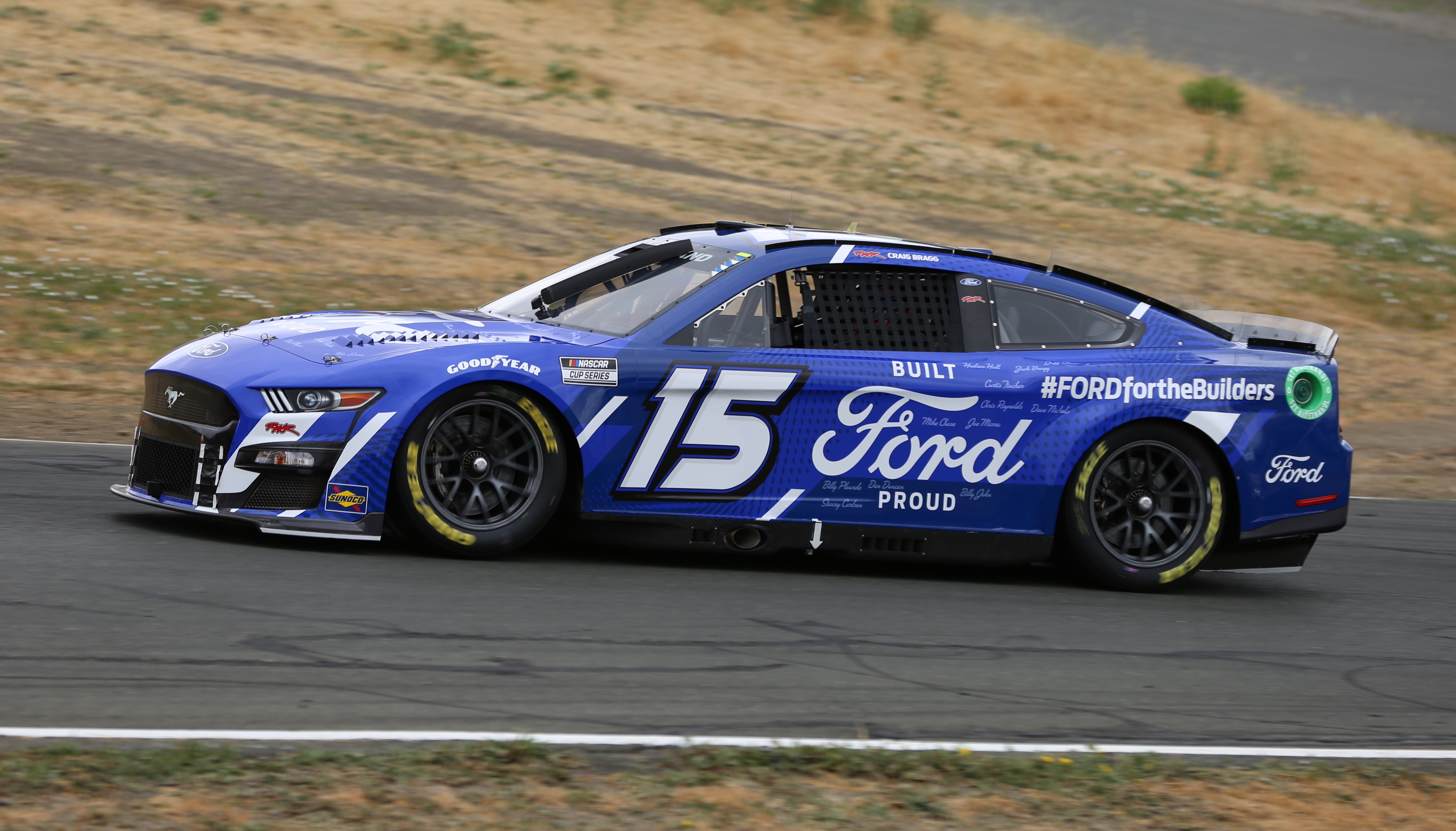
Hand’s No. 15 car at Sonoma Raceway in 2022

On October 5, 2021, Rick Ware Racing announced that Hand would make his NASCAR debut in the NASCAR Cup Series race at the Charlotte Motor Speedway Roval driving the No. 52. Hand started 36th and finished in 27th. In 2022, Hand drove in all six of the Cup Series road course races, driving for Rick Ware in the No. 15. His best finish was twentieth at Sonoma, and his best starting spot was ninth in Road America. On June 12, 2024, it was announced that Hand would be driving the No. 60 car for RFK Racing in the Chicago Street race. Hand won the second stage in that race for his first career stage win in the NASCAR Cup Series. Hand led seven laps and almost won the race entirely before being passed by eventual race winner Alex Bowman, after which Hand fell back to fourth.

=== DTM ===
On December 15, 2011, Hand was announced as one of BMW's factory drivers for the Deutsche Tourenwagen Masters, which saw him compete in the entire 2012 championship, alongside a limited-season American Le Mans Series campaign with BMW Team RLL. He was the first American to have a full-season factory contract in the series since its inception in 1984. In three seasons, he had a best race result of fifth at Brands Hatch and a best season result of twelfth, both in 2013.

== Personal life ==
Born in Sacramento, California, Hand and his wife, Natalie, have two children.

== Motorsports career results ==
=== Career summary ===
Season	Series	Team	Races	Wins	Poles	F/Laps	Podiums	Points	Position
2001	American Le Mans Series - GT	Prototype Technology Group	1	0	0	0	0	0	NC
2001	Formula Atlantic	DSTP Motorsports	12	2	1	1	7	129	**3rd**
2002	Formula Atlantic	DSTP Motorsports	6	0	1	0	1	45	12th
2003	Formula Atlantic	DSTP Motorsports	12	0	0	0	1	108	7th
2004	Formula Atlantic	Polestar Motor Racing	1	0	0	0	0	13	20th
2006	American Le Mans Series - GT2	BMW Team PTG	10	0	0	0	3	84	7th
2007	American Le Mans Series - GT2	Panoz Team PTG	12	0	0	0	1	47	22nd
2008	American Le Mans Series - GT2	Panoz Team PTG	3	0	0	0	0	15	46th
2009	American Le Mans Series - GT2	BMW Rahal Letterman Racing	10	1	0	0	2	44	20th
2010	American Le Mans Series - GT2	BMW Rahal Letterman Racing	9	1	0	0	4	101	7th
2011	American Le Mans Series - GT	BMW Team RLL	9	3	4	0	6	159	**1st**
2011	24 Hours of Le Mans - LMGTE Pro	BMW Motorsport	1	0	0	0	1	N/A	**3rd**
2012	American Le Mans Series - GT	BMW Team RLL	7	1	0	0	3	91	7th
2012	Deutsche Tourenwagen Masters	BMW Team RMG	10	0	0	0	0	6	20th
2013	American Le Mans Series - GT	BMW Team RLL	5	0	0	0	2	52	12th
2013	Deutsche Tourenwagen Masters	BMW Team RBM	10	0	0	0	0	32	12th
2014	United SportsCar Championship - GTLM	BMW Team RLL	3	0	0	0	2	76	23rd
2014	Deutsche Tourenwagen Masters	BMW Team RBM	10	0	0	0	0	8	20th
2015	United SportsCar Championship - Prototype	Chip Ganassi Racing	10	1	0	0	5	301	4th
2016	IMSA SportsCar Championship - GTLM	Ford Chip Ganassi Racing	11	0	0	0	3	301	6th
2016	24 Hours of Le Mans - LMGTE Pro	Ford Chip Ganassi Team USA	1	1	0	0	1	N/A	**1st**
2017	IMSA SportsCar Championship - GTLM	Ford Chip Ganassi Racing	11	2	3	0	3	306	**3rd**
2017	24 Hours of Le Mans - LMGTE Pro	Ford Chip Ganassi Team USA	1	0	0	0	0	N/A	6th
2018	IMSA SportsCar Championship - GTLM	Ford Chip Ganassi Racing	11	2	1	0	4	308	4th
2018	24 Hours of Le Mans - LMGTE Pro	Ford Chip Ganassi Team USA	1	0	0	0	1	N/A	**3rd**
2019	IMSA SportsCar Championship - GTLM	Ford Chip Ganassi Racing	9	1	0	0	4	254	10th
2019	24 Hours of Le Mans - LMGTE Pro	Ford Chip Ganassi Team USA	1	0	0	0	0	N/A	DSQ
2020	IMSA SportsCar Championship - GTD	Michael Shank Racing w/ Curb-Agajanian	1	0	0	0	0	25	46th
2021	NASCAR Cup Series	Rick Ware Racing	1	0	0	0	0	10	35th
2022	NASCAR Cup Series	Rick Ware Racing	6	0	0	0	0	64	34th
2024	IMSA SportsCar Championship - GTD Pro	Ford Multimatic Motorsports	10	0	0	0	0	2555	10th
2024	NASCAR Cup Series	RFK Racing	1	0	0	0	0	43	39th
2025	IMSA SportsCar Championship - GTD	Gradient Racing	5	0	0	0	0	995	27th
2026	IMSA SportsCar Championship - GTD	Gradient Racing	4	0	0	0	0	746	44th

=== American open–wheel racing results ===
(key) (Races in bold indicate pole position) (Races in italics indicate fastest lap)

==== Atlantic Championship ====
Formula Atlantic results
Year	Team	1	2	3	4	5	6	7	8	9	10	11	12	Rank	Points
2001	DSTP Motorsports	LBH; 3	NAZ; 9	MIL; 12	MTL; 15	CLE; 2	TOR; 5	CHI; 10	TRR; 3	ROA; 3	VAN; 1	HOU; 1	**LS**; 2	**3rd**	**129**
2002	DSTP Motorsports	MTY; 3	**LBH**; 25	MIL	LS	POR	CHI	TOR	CLE	TRR; 9	ROA; 5	MTL; 4	DEN; 25	**12th**	**45**
2003	DSTP Motorsports	MTY; 15	LBH; 7	MIL; 9	LS; 10	POR; 2	CLE; 10	TOR; 6	TRR; 4	MOH; 4	MTL; 5	DEN; 9	MIA; 6	**7th**	**108**
2004	Polestar Motor Racing	LBH	MTY	MIL	POR1	POR2	CLE	TOR	VAN	ROA	DEN	MTL	LS; 9	**20th**	**13**

=== American Le Mans Series results ===
(key) (Races in bold indicate pole position; results in italics indicate fastest lap)

Year	Team	Class	Make	Engine	1	2	3	4	5	6	7	8	9	10	11	12	Pos.	Points	Ref
2001	Prototype Technology Group	GT	BMW M3 GTR	BMW 3.2L I6	TEX	SEB; DNF	DON	JAR	SON	POR	MOS	MID	MON	PET			NC	0	
2006	BMW Team PTG	GT2	BMW M3	BMW 3.4L I6	SEB; DNF	TEX; DNF	MID; 4	LIM; 3	UTA; 6	POR; 3	AME; 2	MOS; 5	PET; 6	MON; 8			7th	84	
2007	Panoz Team PTG	GT2	Panoz Esperante GT-LM	Ford (Élan) 5.0L V8	SEB; DNF	STP; 3	LNB; 5	TEX; DNF	UTA; DNF	LIM; 8	MID; DNF	AME; 10	MOS; DNF	DET; 7	PET; 7	MON; 6	22nd	47	
2008	Panoz Team PTG	GT2	Panoz Esperante GT-LM	Ford (Élan) 5.0L V8	SEB; DNF	STP	LBH	UTA	LRP	MOH	ELK	MOS	DET	PET; 12	LAG; 4		46th	15	
2009	BMW Rahal Letterman Racing	GT2	BMW M3 GT2	BMW 4.0 L V8	SEB; DNF	STP; DNF	LBH; 8	UTA; 8	LRP; 3	MOH; 8	ELK; 1	MOS; 9	PET; 12	LAG; DNF			20th	44	
2010	BMW Rahal Letterman Racing	GT	BMW M3 GT2	BMW 4.0 L V8	SEB; 3	LBH; 5	LAG; 2	UTA; 4	LRP; 3	MOH; 6	ELK; 1	MOS; DNF	PET; 13				7th	101	
2011	BMW Team RLL	GT	BMW M3 GT2	BMW 4.0 L V8	SEB; 1	**LBH**; 1	**LRP**; 1	**MOS**; 4	**MOH**; 4	**ELK**; 3	BAL; 2	**LAG**; 2	PET; 9				1st	159	
2012	BMW Team RLL	GT	BMW M3 GT2	BMW 4.0 L V8	SEB; 1	**LBH**; 2	LAG; 4	LRP; 5	MOS; 3	MOH; 5	ELK	BAL; 4	VIR	PET			7th	91	
2013	BMW Team RLL	GT	BMW Z4 GTE	BMW 4.4 L V8	SEB; 7	LBH; 2	LAG; 5	LRP	MOS	ELK	BAL; 3	COA	VIR; 4	PET			12th	52	

=== Rolex Sports Car Series results ===
(key) (Races in bold indicate pole position) (Races in italics indicate fastest lap)

Year	Team	Class	Make	Engine	1	2	3	4	5	6	7	8	9	10	11	12	13	14	Rank	Points	Ref
2004	Prototype Technology Group, Inc.	GT	BMW M3 E46	BMW 3.2 L I6	DAY; 17	HOM; 2	PHX	MTT; 4	WGL; 8	DAY; 2	MOH; 4	WGL; 1	HOM; 4	VIR; 2	BIR; 2	CAL; 2			6th	316	
2005	Prototype Technology Group, Inc.	GT	BMW M3 E46	BMW 3.2 L I6	DAY; 30	HOM; 7	**CAL**; 1	LAG; 1	MTT; 3	WGL; 11	DAY; 1	**BIR**; 1	**WGL**; 2	**MOH**; 16	PHX; 3	WGL; 13	VIR; 2	MEX	4th	337	
2006	Matt Connolly Motorsports	GT	BMW M3 E46	BMW 3.2 L I6	DAY	MEX	HOM	VIR; 10	LAG	PHX	LRP		**MOH**; 7	DAY	BAR	SON; 12	UTA		28th	105	
2006	Sigalsport BMW	GT	BMW M3 E46	BMW 3.2 L I6								WGL; 18							28th	105	
2007	Howard Motorsports	GT	Infiniti G35	Infiniti 3.7 L V6	DAY; 34	MEX	HOM	VIR	MTY	LRP	WGL	MOH	DAY	IOW	BAR	MON	UTA		NC	0	
2007	Sigalsport BMW	DP	Riley Technologies MkXI	BMW S62-B50 5.0L V8	DAY	MEX	HOM	VIR	LAG	WGL; 15	MOH	DAY	BAR	IOW	MON	WGL	SON	UTA; 16	56th	31	
2008	Alex Job Racing	DP	Crawford DP03	Porsche 3.99L F6	DAY; 15	HOM; 2	MEX; 13	VIR; 7	LAG; 11	WGL; 16	MOH; 19	DAY; 8							13th	287	
2008	Alex Job Racing	DP	Riley MkXI	Porsche 3.99L F6									BAR; 12	MON; 15	WGL; 4	SON; 8	NJ; 3	MIL; 8	13th	287	
2010	Turner Motorsport	GT	BMW M6	BMW 5.0L V10	DAY; 8	HOM; 5	BIR		LIM; 8	WGL	MOH; 1	DAY; 2	NJ; 5	WGL	MON	MIL; 5			16th	191	
2010	Starworks Motorsport	DP	Riley Mk. XX	BMW 5.0L V8				VIR; 9											36th	22	
2011	Chip Ganassi Racing with Felix Sabates	DP	Riley Mk. XX	BMW 5.0L V8	DAY; 1	HOM	BIR	VIR	LIM	WGL	ELK	LAG	NJ	WAT	MON	LEX			23rd	35	
2011	Turner Motorsport	GT	BMW M3	BMW 5.0L V8		HOM	BIR	VIR	LIM	WGL; 11	ELK	LAG	NJ	WAT; 17	MON	LEX			42nd	34	
2012	Chip Ganassi Racing with Felix Sabates	DP	Riley Mk. XXVI	BMW 5.0L V8	DAY; 6	BAR	HOM	NJ	BEL	MOH	ELK	WGL	IMS	WGL	MON	LAG	LIM		31st	25	
2013	Chip Ganassi Racing with Felix Sabates	DP	Riley Mk. XXVI	BMW 5.0L V8	DAY; 11	COA	BAR	ATL	DET	MOH	WGL	IMS; 9	ELK	KAN	LAG	LIM			29th	42	

=== 24 Hours of Le Mans results ===
Year	Team	Co-drivers	Car	Class	Laps	Pos.	Class pos.
2011	(Germany) BMW Motorsport	(United Kingdom) Andy Priaulx (Germany) Dirk Müller	BMW M3 GT2	GTE; Pro	313	15th	**3rd**
2016	(United States) Ford Chip Ganassi Team USA	(France) Sébastien Bourdais (Germany) Dirk Müller	Ford GT	GTE; Pro	340	18th	**1st**
2017	(United States) Ford Chip Ganassi Team USA	(Brazil) Tony Kanaan (Germany) Dirk Müller	Ford GT	GTE; Pro	339	22nd	6th
2018	(United States) Ford Chip Ganassi Team USA	(Germany) Dirk Müller (France) Sébastien Bourdais	Ford GT	GTE; Pro	343	17th	**3rd**
2019	(United States) Ford Chip Ganassi Team USA	(Germany) Dirk Müller (France) Sébastien Bourdais	Ford GT	GTE; Pro	342	DSQ	DSQ

=== Complete DTM results ===
(key)

Deutsche Tourenwagen Masters results
Year	Team	Car	1	2	3	4	5	6	7	8	9	10	Pos.	Pts
2012	BMW Team RMG	BMW M3 DTM	HOC; 13	LAU; 14	BRH; 13	SPL; 9	NOR; 14	NÜR; 18	ZAN; 14	OSC; 11	VAL; 15†	HOC; 8	20th	6
2013	BMW Team RBM	BMW M3 DTM	HOC; 7	BRH; 5	SPL; Ret	LAU; 15	NOR; 8	MSC; 7	NÜR; Ret	OSC; 16	ZAN; 7	HOC; 20	12th	32
2014	BMW Team RBM	BMW M4 DTM	HOC; 10	OSC; 15	HUN; 15	NOR; 7	MSC; 17	SPL; 12	NÜR; 14	LAU; 11	ZAN; 10	HOC; 15	20th	8

=== Complete IMSA SportsCar Championship results ===
(key)(Races in bold indicate pole position, Results are overall/class)

Year	Team	Class	Make	Engine	1	2	3	4	5	6	7	8	9	10	11	Rank	Points	Ref
2014	BMW Team RLL	GTLM	BMW Z4 GTE	BMW 4.4 L V8	DAY; 2	SEB; 3	LBH	LGA	WGL	MOS	IMS	ELK	VIR	COA	PET; 10†	23rd	76	
2015	Chip Ganassi Racing	P	Ford EcoBoost Riley DP	Ford Ecoboost 3.5 L V6 Turbo	DAY; 6	SEB; 4	LBH; 2	LGA; 7	DET; 4	WGL; 2	MOS; 6	ELK; 3	COA; 1	PET; 2		4th	301	
2016	Ford Chip Ganassi Racing	GTLM	Ford GT	Ford 3.5 L EcoBoost V6	DAY; 7	SEB; 8	LBH; 8	LGA; 6	WGL; 2	MOS; 5	LIM; 5	ELK; 9	VIR; 2	COA; 6	PET; 2	6th	301	
2017	Ford Chip Ganassi Racing	GTLM	Ford GT	Ford 3.5 L EcoBoost V6	**DAY**; 1	SEB; 2	LBH; 8	COA; 5	**WGL**; 4	MOS; 5	LIM; 7	ROA; 1	**VIR**; 5	LGA; 6	PET; 7	3rd	306	
2018	Ford Chip Ganassi Racing	GTLM	Ford GT	Ford 3.5 L EcoBoost V6	DAY; 2	SEB; 9	**LBH**; 3	MOH; 4	WGL; 1	MOS; 5	LIM; 1	ROA; 7	VIR; 4	LGA; 7	PET; 7	4th	308	
2019	Ford Chip Ganassi Racing	GTLM	Ford GT	Ford 3.5 L EcoBoost V6	DAY; 7	SEB; 2	LBH	MOH	WGL; 4	MOS; 6	LIM; 3	ELK; 2	VIR; 6	LGA; 1	PET; 8	10th	254	
2020	Michael Shank Racing w/ Curb-Agajanian	GTD	Acura NSX GT3 Evo	Acura 3.5 L Turbo V6	DAY	DAY	SEB	ELK	VIR	ATL	MOH	CLT	PET	LGA	SEB; 6	46th	25	
2024	Ford Multimatic Motorsports	GTD Pro	Ford Mustang GT3	Ford Coyote 5.4 L V8	DAY; 9	SEB; 8	LGA; 8	DET; 7	WGL; 10	MOS; 7	ELK; 8	VIR; 4	IMS; 12	PET; 6		10th	2555	
2025	Gradient Racing	GTD	Ford Mustang GT3	Ford Coyote 5.4 L V8	DAY; 17	SEB; 13	LBH	LGA	WGL; 6	MOS	ELK	VIR	IMS; 10	PET; 17		27th	995	
2026	Gradient Racing	GTD	Ford Mustang GT3	Ford Coyote 5.4 L V8	DAY; 18	SEB; 8	LBH	LGA	WGL	MOS	ELK; 13	VIR	IMS	PET; 15		44th	746	

^{†} Hand did not complete sufficient laps to score full points.

=== NASCAR ===
(key) (Bold – Pole position awarded by qualifying time. Italics – Pole position earned by points standings or practice time. * – Most laps led.)

==== Cup Series ====
NASCAR Cup Series results
Year	Team	No.	Make	1	2	3	4	5	6	7	8	9	10	11	12	13	14	15	16	17	18	19	20	21	22	23	24	25	26	27	28	29	30	31	32	33	34	35	36	NCSC	Pts	Ref
2021	Rick Ware Racing	52	Ford	DAY	DAY	HOM	LVS	PHO	ATL	BRI	MAR	RCH	TAL	KAN	DAR	DOV	COA	CLT	SON	NSH	POC	POC	ROA	ATL	NHA	GLN	IRC	MCH	DAY	DAR	RCH	BRI	LVS	TAL	ROV; 27	TEX	KAN	MAR	PHO	35th	10	
2022	Rick Ware Racing	15	Ford	DAY	CAL	LVS	PHO	ATL	COA; 35	RCH	MAR	BRD	TAL	DOV	DAR	KAN	CLT	GTW	SON; 20	NSH	ROA; 21	ATL	NHA	POC	IRC; 29	MCH	RCH	GLN; 31	DAY	DAR	KAN	BRI	TEX	TAL	ROV; 38	LVS	HOM	MAR	PHO	34th	64	
2024	RFK Racing	60	Ford	DAY	ATL	LVS	PHO	BRI	COA	RCH	MAR	TEX	TAL	DOV	KAN	DAR	CLT	GTW	SON	IOW	NHA	NSH	CSC; 4	POC	IND	RCH	MCH	DAY	DAR	ATL	GLN	BRI	KAN	TAL	ROV	LVS	HOM	MAR	PHO	39th	43	

==== Xfinity Series ====
NASCAR Xfinity Series results
Year	Team	No.	Make	1	2	3	4	5	6	7	8	9	10	11	12	13	14	15	16	17	18	19	20	21	22	23	24	25	26	27	28	29	30	31	32	33	NXSC	Pts	Ref
2025	RSS Racing	28	Ford	DAY	ATL	COA	PHO	LVS	HOM	MAR	DAR	BRI	CAR	TAL	TEX	CLT	NSH	MXC	POC	ATL	CSC	SON	DOV	IND	IOW	GLN	DAY	PIR; 19	GTW	BRI	KAN	ROV	LVS	TAL	MAR	PHO	60th	18	

^{*} Season still in progress
^{1} Ineligible for series points

Sporting positions
Preceded by Ian Lacy	Star Mazda Championship Champion; 1999	Succeeded by Bernardo Martinez
