= Hoover Orsi =

Brazilian racing driver

- Nationality: (Brazil) Brazilian
- Born: May 16, 1978 (age 48) Campo Grande, MS (Brazil)

Stock Car Brasil career
- Debut season: 2004
- Former teams: Amir Nasr Racing; Avallone Motorsport
- Starts: 61
- Wins: 4
- Poles: 3
- Fastest laps: 2
- Best finish: 3rd in 2005 and 2006

Previous series
- 2006 2000–2003 1999 1998 1997: Rolex Sports Car Series; Champ Car Atlantic; Formula Three Sudamericana; Formula Renault Europe; Formula Renault 2000 UK

Championship titles
- 2001 1999: Champ Car Atlantic; Formula Three Sudamericana

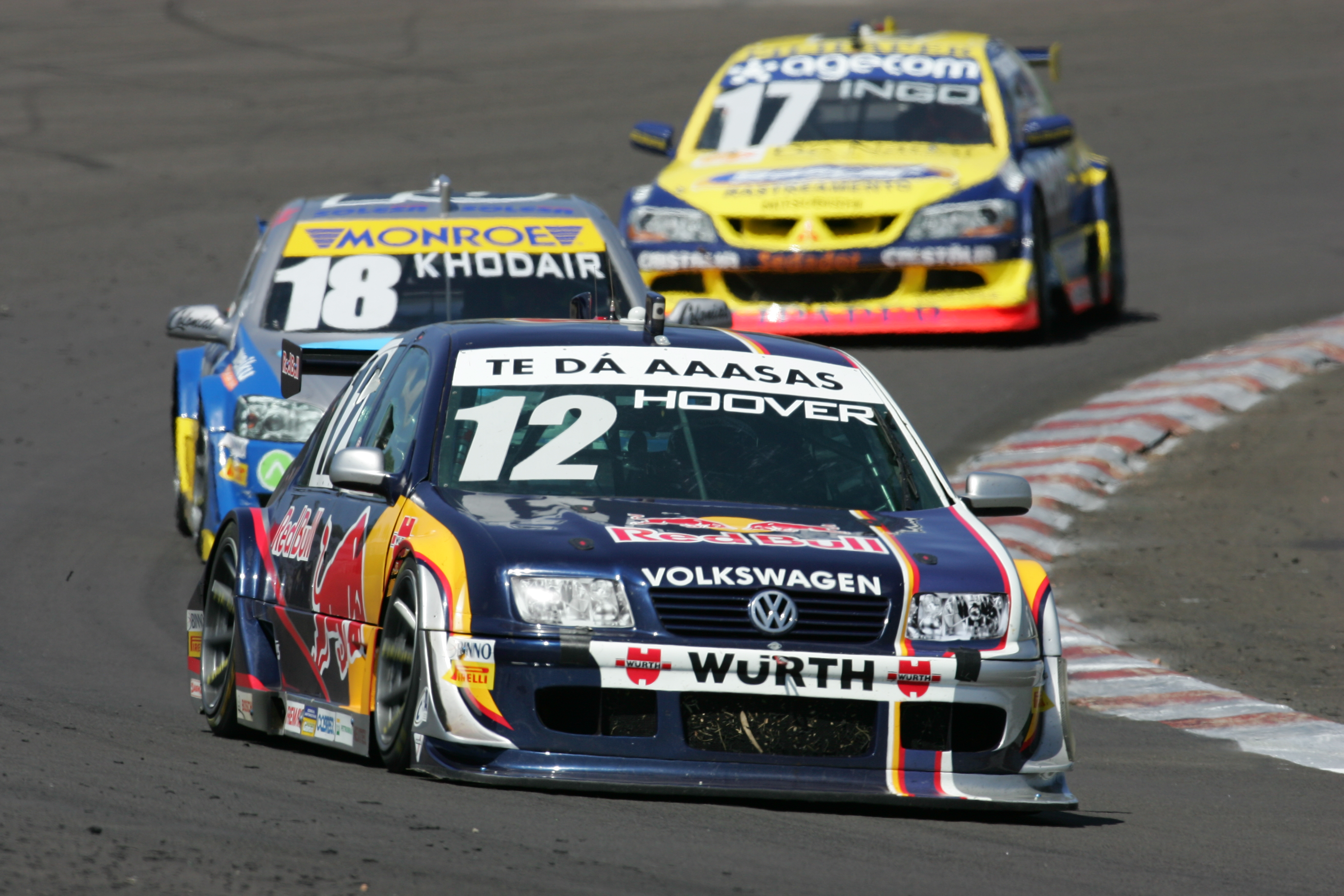
Orsi leads Allam Khodair and Ingo Hoffman in the 2007 Stock Car Brasil season.

Hoover Orsi Pereira Martins (born May 16, 1978 in Campo Grande, Mato Grosso do Sul) is a Brazilian race car driver. He began his professional career in 1998 in the European Formula Renault series where he captured fourth place. He returned to South America where he was the South American Formula 3 champion in 1999. 2000 brought him to the United States to compete in Toyota Atlantic where he finished seventh in his rookie season. In 2001, he switched teams to Hylton Motorsports and captured five wins on his way to the championship. However, in 2002, very few opportunities existed to move up to the Champ Car series and Orsi was left without a ride. In 2005, he made his Stock Car Brasil debut and captured three wins and finished third in the championship. In 2006, he split time between Stock Car Brasil where he finished third, but without any wins, and a frustrating partial season in the Cheever Racing Grand-Am Rolex Sports Car Series Daytona Prototype with teammate Christian Fittipaldi. In 2008, Orsi finished Stock Car championship in the 23rd position, 2008 was the last full-time season of Orsi in the category. After one year without competing in races, Hoover returned on the Trofeo Linea Brasil in 2011; however, he abandoned the category after losing his sponsorship. Orsi also competed in some races of the TC 2000 Championship.

== Racing record ==
=== Career summary ===
Season	Series	Team	Races	Wins	Poles	F/Laps	Podiums	Points	Position
1995	Formula Ford 1600 Brazil	Darci Competiçoes	12	2	0	6	2	?	2nd
1996	Formula Renault 2000 UK	Manor Motorsports	12	0	0	3	2	77	7th
1997	Formula Renault 2000 UK	Redgrave Racing	12	2	1	5	?	113	4th
1997	Eurocup Formula Renault	Redgrave Racing	?	?	?	?	?	0	NC
1998	Eurocup Formula Renault	Tatuus RC Motorsport	10	1	0	3	0	116	4th
1998	Masters of Formula 3	Fortec Motorsport	1	0	0	0	0	N/A	NC
1999	Formula Three Sudamericana	Césario Fórmula	18	4	4	9	5	211	1st
2000	Atlantic Championship	Hylton Motorsports	12	0	0	3	0	76	7th
2001	Atlantic Championship	Hylton Motorsports	12	5	4	11	0	187	1st
2003	Atlantic Championship	Sierra Sierra Racing	1	0	0	0	0	2	23rd
2004	Stock Car Brasil	Avallone Motorsport	12	0	0	0	0	14	26th
2005	Stock Car Brasil	NasrCastroneves	12	3	3	4	1	115	3rd
2006	Stock Car Brasil	NasrCastroneves	12	0	0	5	1	248	3rd
2006	TC 2000	Ford YPF-Berta Motorsport	1	0	1	1	0	N/A	NC
2006	Rolex Sports Car Series	Cheever Racing	5	0	0	0	0	50	73rd
2007	Stock Car Brasil	Red Bull Racing	12	1	0	1	0	219	10th
2007	TC 2000	Ford-YPF	1	0	0	0	0	N/A	NC
2008	Stock Car Brasil	Red Bull Racing	12	0	0	0	0	22	23rd
2008	TC 2000	Chevrolet Elaion	1	0	0	0	0	N/A	NC
2009	Stock Car Brasil	Amir Nasr Racing	1	0	0	0	0	0	31st
2009	GT3 Brasil Championship	WB Motorsport	4	0	3	0	0	45	20th
2011	Trofeo Linea Brasil	Fittipaldi Racing	4	0	0	0	0	14	16th
2011	TC 2000	Sportteam Competición	1	0	0	0	0	N/A	NC

=== American open-wheel racing results ===
(key)

==== Barber Dodge Pro Series ====
Year	1	2	3	4	5	6	7	8	9	10	11	12	Rank	Points
1998	SEB; 20	LRP; 19	DET; 11	WGI; 13	CLE; 9	GRA; 6	MDO; 5	ROA; 21	LS1; 12	ATL; 17	HMS; 4	LS2; 14	10th	55

==== Atlantic Championship ====
Year	Team	1	2	3	4	5	6	7	8	9	10	11	12	Rank	Points
2000	Hylton Motorsports	HMS1; 3	HMS2; 23	LBH; 5	MIL; 3	MTL; 24	CLE; 3	TOR; 26	TRR; 21	ROA; 8	LS; 7	GAT; 8	HOU; 6	7th	76
2001	Hylton Motorsports	LBH; 2	NAZ; 2	MIL; 1	MTL; 20	CLE; 1	TOR; 2	CHI; 1	TRR; 1	ROA; 1	VAN; 3	HOU; 2	LS; 3	1st	187

==== Indy Lights ====
Year	Team	1	2	3	4	5	6	7	8	9	10	11	12	Rank	Points
2006	Cheever Racing	HMS	STP1	STP2	INDY	WGL	IMS	NSH	MIL	KTY	SNM1; DNS	SNM2; Wth	CHI	NR	0

=== Complete Stock Car Brasil results ===
Year	Team	Car	1	2	3	4	5	6	7	8	9	10	11	12	Pos	Points
2004	Avallone Motorsport	Chevrolet Astra	CTB; 14	INT; Ret	TAR; 20	LON; Ret	RIO; 7	INT; 16	CTB; 24	LON; DSQ	RIO; Ret	BSB; 16	CGD; 11	INT; Ret	26th	14
2005	NasrCastroneves	Chevrolet Astra	INT; Ret	CTB; 18	RIO; 5	INT; 1	CTB; 2	LON; 1	BSB; Ret	SCZ; Ret	TAR; 8	ARG; Ret	RIO; 17	INT; 1	3rd	115
2006	NasrCastroneves	Volkswagen Bora	INT; 2	CTB; 2	CGD; 3	INT; 4	LON; 10	CTB; 7	SCZ	BSB; 3	TAR; 21	ARG; 5	RIO; 3	INT; Ret	3rd	248
2007	Red Bull-Amir Nasr	Volkswagen Bora	INT; 4	CTB; 19	CGD; 23	INT; 9	LON; 28	SCZ; Ret	CTB; 24	BSB; 1	ARG; 18	TAR; 14	RIO; 8	INT; Ret	10th	219
2008	Red Bull-Amir Nasr	Chevrolet Astra	INT; 10	BSB; 7	CTB; 16	SCZ; 16	CGD; Ret	INT; 10	RIO; Ret	LON; 24	CTB; Ret	BSB; 13	TAR; Ret	INT; 17	21st	24
2009	Amir Nasr Racing	Peugeot 307	INT	CTB	BSB	SCZ	INT	SAL	RIO	CDG; 24	CTB	BSB	TAR	INT	31st	0

Sporting positions
Preceded by Gabriel Furlán	Formula Three Sudamericana Champion; 1999	Succeeded by Vítor Meira
Preceded by Buddy Rice	Toyota Atlantic Champion; 2001	Succeeded by Jon Fogarty
