= Alex Gurney =

American racing driver

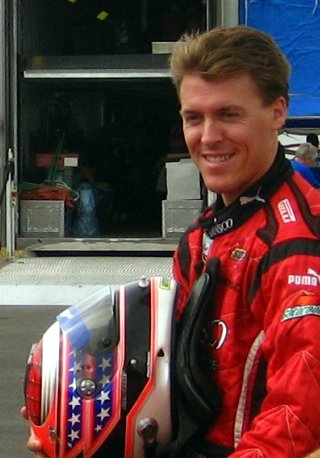
- Gurney in 2010
- Nationality: (United States) American
- Born: September 4, 1974 (age 52) Newport Beach, California, U.S.
- Relatives: Dan Gurney (father)

Rolex Sports Car Series career
- Current team: GAINSCO/Bob Stallings Racing

Previous series
- Toyota Atlantic; British Formula 3

Championship titles
- 2007, 2009: GRAND-AM Daytona Prototype

Alexander Gurney (born September 4, 1974) is an American racing driver who competed in the Rolex Sports Car Series for GAINSCO/Bob Stallings Racing. He won the 2007 and 2009 GRAND-AM Rolex Sports Car Series Daytona Prototype drivers' championship and is the son of racing legend Dan Gurney. In 2013, he came in third place with teammate Jon Fogarty. The following year, he became the first Corvette Daytona Prototype driver with an overall pole position for the Rolex 24 At Daytona, after which he retired.

== Early racing career ==
The youngest son of 1968 Indianapolis 500 runner-up and Formula One driver Dan Gurney, Alex competed in the Midwest Skip Barber Formula Dodge Series, Barber Dodge Pro Series, Toyota Atlantic Championship, and British Formula 3 Championship.

== Rolex Sports Car Series ==
Gurney moved to the Rolex Sports Car Series in 2005, driving for GAINSCO/Bob Stallings Racing in the Daytona Prototype division. He scored two poles and four top-ten finishes in his first year, co-driving with team owner Bob Stallings.

In 2006, Gurney was paired with fellow former Atlantic Championship star Jon Fogarty, finishing 11th in Daytona Prototype points with two runner-up finishes to his credit. In 2007, the pairing combined for a series-record seven wins and ten poles, en route to the Daytona Prototype drivers' championship.

Gurney and Fogarty finished second in the championship standings in 2008, with one victory and eight top-five finishes. In 2009, they earned their second Daytona Prototype championship in a season that saw the No. 99 GAINSCO Riley Pontiac score four victories and six pole positions.

In 2010 and 2011, Gurney finished fourth in the Daytona Prototype points standings.

Fogarty and Gurney return to GAINSCO/Bob Stallings Racing for 2012, with its Riley-Chevrolet sporting new Corvette-themed bodywork introduced by GM.

== iRacing ==
Gurney finished first in the 2021 Season 1 Radical Racing Challenge Division 3 Championship and holds 12 Time Attack Overall podiums.

== Personal life ==
Gurney is married to Colleen and has two children. He holds a Business Administration degree from the University of Colorado Boulder in 1997.

Gurney portrayed his father in the 2019 film Ford v Ferrari.

== Motorsports racing results ==
=== American open-wheel racing results ===
(key)

==== Barber Dodge Pro Series ====
Year	1	2	3	4	5	6	7	8	9	10	11	12	Rank	Points
1998	SEB; 20	LRP; 19	DET; 11	WGI; 13	CLE; 9	GRA; 6	MDO; 5	ROA; 21	LS1; 12	ATL; 17	HMS; 4	LS2; 14	**10th**	**55**

==== Atlantic Championship ====
Year	Team	1	2	3	4	5	6	7	8	9	10	11	12	Rank	Points
1999	Team Green	LBH; 25	NAZ; 8	GAT; 11	MIL; 13	MTL; 5	ROA; 26	TRR; 7	MDO; 12	CHI; 13	VAN; 17	LS; 7	HOU; 6	**12th**	**38**
2000	All American Racers	HMS1; 24	HMS2; 22	LBH; 10	MIL; 5	MTL; 7	**CLE**; 18	TOR; 8	TRR; 3	ROA; 5	LS; 6	GAT; 18	HOU; 16	**8th**	**57**
2002	Dorricott Racing	MTY; 22	LBH; 2	MIL; 4	LS; 6	POR; 6	CHI; 10	TOR; 5	CLE; 8	TRR; 2	ROA; 3	MTL; 5	DEN; 23	**3rd**	**132**

=== Rolex Series career ===
(key) (Races in bold indicate pole position)

Year	Team	1	2	3	4	5	6	7	8	9	10	11	12	13	14	Rank	Points
2005	GAINSCO/Blackhawk	R24; DNP	MIA; DNP	FON; DNP	LAG; 6	MTT; DNP	WG6; DNP	DAY; 9	**BAR**; 8	WGI; 2	**MDO**; 11	PHX; Ret	WGI; 11	VIR; DNS	MEX; 11	**11th**	**175**
2006	GAINSCO/Blackhawk	R24; 13	MEX; 13	MIA; 6	LBH; DNS	VIR; 14	LAG; 2	PHX; 8	WG6; 2	MDO; 3	DAY; 5	BAR; 4	**WGI**; 13	SON; DNS	SLC; 9	**6th**	**289**
2007	GAINSCO/Bob Stallings	**R24**; Ret	MEX; 1	MIA; 11	VIR; 5	LAG; 6	**WG6**; 1	MDO; 1	DAY; 1	IOW; 3	BAR; 1	MON; 3	WGI; 1	SON; 1	SLC; 8	**1st**	**408**
2008	GAINSCO/Bob Stallings	R24; 2	MIA; 6	MEX; 4	VIR; 14	LAG; 4	WG6; 8	MDO; 1	DAY; 2	BAR; 16	MON; 8	WGI; 2	SON; 2	NJ; 4	SLC; 3	**2nd**	**378**
2009	GAINSCO/Bob Stallings	R24; 7	VIR; 1	NJ; 6	LAG; 1	WG6; Ret	MDO; 3	DAY; 2	BAR; 1	WGI; 4	MON; 3	SLC; 1	MIA; 4			**1st**	**337**

=== WeatherTech SportsCar Championship results ===
(key)(Races in bold indicate pole position, Results are overall/class)

Year	Team	Class	Make	Engine	1	2	3	4	5	6	7	8	9	10	11	Rank	Points	Ref
2014	GAINSCO/Bob Stallings Racing	P	Riley Corvette DP	Chevrolet 5.5L V8	DAY; 18	SEB	LBH	LAG	DET	WGL	MOS	IMS	ROA	COA	PET	56th	14	

Sporting positions
Preceded by Jörg Bergmeister	Rolex Sports Car Series DP Champion; 2007 with Jon Fogarty	Succeeded by Scott Pruett; Memo Rojas
Preceded by Scott Pruett; Memo Rojas	Rolex Sports Car Series DP Champion; 2009 with Jon Fogarty	Succeeded by Scott Pruett; Memo Rojas
