= John Fogerty (disambiguation) =

John Fogerty (born 1945) is an American musician and lead singer for the group Creedence Clearwater Revival.

John Fogerty may also refer to:

- John Fogerty (engineer) (19th century), Irish millwright, architect, builder and civil engineer
- John Fogerty (album)
- John Frederick Fogerty (1863–1938), Irish architect and engineer

== See also ==
- John Fogarty (disambiguation)
