= Tahnee Ahtone =

Kiowa regalia artist, curator

- Born: Tahnee Marie Ahtone Harjo; Mountain View, Oklahoma, Zoltone, U.S.
- Other names: Tahnee Ahtone Harjo-Growing Thunder, Tahnee Ahtoneharjo-Growingthunder, Tahnee Ahtone Harjo, Tahnee Growing Thunder, Tahnee M. Ahtone
- Citizenship: Kiowa Indian Tribe of Oklahoma, American
- Education: Institute of American Indian Arts, Harvard University
- Known for: Curation, textile arts, beadwork
- Spouse: George Growing Thunder
- Mother: Sharron Ahtone Harjo
- Website: www.tahneeahtone.com

Tahnee Ahtone is a Kiowa beadwork artist, regalia maker, curator, and museum professional of Muscogee and Seminole descent, from Mountain View, Oklahoma. She became curator of Native American art at the Nelson-Atkins Museum of Art in Kansas City, Missouri in February 2024.

== Background ==
Tahnee Marie Ahtone Harjo is the daughter of Amos Harjo (Seminole, Muscogee) and Sharron Ahtone Harjo (Kiowa), a painter, ledger artist, and educator. She is an enrolled citizen of the Kiowa Indian Tribe of Oklahoma.

Her maternal grandparents were Evelyn Tahome (Dáu:tsáihè:bà) and Jacob Ahtone, who served as Kiowa tribal chairman from 1978 to 1980, and as a United States Department of Interior administrator who contributed to the American Indian Religious Freedom Act and the Indian Arts and Craft Act of 1990. Tahnee is named after her great-aunt who died as a child, Ah-stom-pah Ote, which translates to "The One Chosen to Lead In." She is the great-granddaughter of famed lattice cradleboard artists Kiowa captive Millie Durgan, and Tahdo Ahtone. The Ahtone family descend from Fort Marion prisoners and Red River War veterans held at St. Augustine, Florida, noted as Kiowa Ledger Art artists. After his incarceration from Fort Marion, the family's ancestor, Beahko, was sent to Hampton Institute by Richard Henry Pratt. Today, the Ahtone family along with many other Kiowa families hold distinctions as fifth and six generations to obtain advanced and higher education degrees.

== Education ==
Ahtone earned her museum studies BFA degree in 2015 from the Institute of American Indian Arts in Santa Fe. She earned her Master of Liberal Arts degree in museology from Harvard Extension School in Cambridge, Massachusetts.

== Artwork ==
A dancer on the powwow circuit, Ahtone mastered beadwork and sewing dance regalia. Besides creating regalia for the Native community, she also exhibits at major Native American art events, including Santa Fe Indian Market, the National Museum of the American Indian, the Chickasaw Nation's Artesian Arts Festival, and the Red Earth Festival, where her beadwork has won prizes. She is known for figurative work in beadwork. Her work has been part of curated art shows, such as Generations (2013) at the Red Earth Center and Current Realities: A Dialogue with the People (2007) at Individual Artists of Oklahoma (IAO) gallery.

She had a solo exhibition at the Southern Plains Indian Museum in Anadarko, Oklahoma, in 2008.

== Curatorial practice ==
Ahtone is the curator of Native American art at the Nelson-Atkins Museum of Art in Kansas City, Missouri. Previously, Ahtone was director of the Kiowa Tribal Museum in Carnegie, Oklahoma. Before that, she worked at the Oklahoma History Center in Oklahoma City, Oklahoma, as a liaison to Oklahoma's 38 federally recognized tribes. She served as curator of the textile and American Indian Collections at the Oklahoma History Center.

Before returning to Oklahoma, she was the curator and collections manager for the Mashantucket Pequot Museum and Research Center in Ledyard, Connecticut. While at the Pequot Museum, she curated Without a Theme, a group exhibition of First Nations and Native American visual artists who did not necessarily use Native imagery or subject matter in their artwork. Ahtone's other museum contributions include serving the Wallraf-Richartz Museum in Cologne, Germany Once Upon A Time in America, Three Centuries of US- American Art as the cultural adviser, and her participation in the Brown University, Haffenreffer Museum of Anthropology Gifts of Pride and Love: Kiowa and Comanche Cradles exhibition, a research project the Ahtone family contributed to with curator Barbara Hail.

Her research focus is textiles; however, she has extensive knowledge on Native American textile art and beadwork, including beaded medallions.

Ahtone and her husband, George Growing Thunder, own GT Museum Services, a New York City based firm offering consulting and other services to museums.

== Awards ==
Ahtone has been awarded curatorial fellowships with the Center for Curatorial Leadership (2021), the Emily Hall Tremaine Foundation, Journalism Fellowship for Curators (2021), and the Oklahoma Museums Association, Service to the Profession Award for 2019.

== Personal ==
Ahtone is married to George Growing Thunder (Assiniboine), and her married name has also been listed as Tahnee Ahtoneharjo–Growingthunder. Her mother-in-law is beadwork artist Joyce Growing Thunder Fogarty. Ahtone has three stepchildren, and the couple have two daughters.
