= Rocky Moran Jr. =

American racing driver (born 1980)

- Nationality: American
- Born: William Moran Jr. January 11, 1980 (age 46) Pasadena, California, U.S.
- Relatives: Rocky Moran (father)

IndyCar Series career
- Debut season: 2015
- Current team: Dale Coyne Racing
- Car number: 18
- Engine: Honda HI15TT V6t

William James "Rocky" Moran Jr. (born January 11, 1980) is an American racing driver from Irvine, California. He is the son of the late Rocky Moran, also a racer.

== Racing career ==
=== Early career ===
Moran participated in karting from 1990 to 1994. In 1994, he transitioned to cars through the Skip Barber Racing School. He made his professional racing debut in 1996 in the Barber Dodge Pro Series, finishing tenth. He improved to sixth in 1997 but fell back to eleventh in 1998. He made his Toyota Atlantic debut in 1998. Moran split his time between Barber Dodge and Toyota Atlantic in 1999. In 2000, he joined Toyota Atlantic full-time and finished fifth in points for P-1 Racing. In 2001 he began the season with Condor Motorsports but switched to Cobb Racing mid-way through the season. He captured his first series victory in the season finale at Laguna Seca and finished eighth in points. In 2002, he returned to the series driving for Sigma Autosport. He finished fifth in points with a win at Circuit Gilles Villeneuve and two other podium finishes. Moran spent 2003 away from professional motorsports, but returned to Atlantics in 2004, making five starts with Polestar Motor Racing. He made three Busch North Series race starts in 2005 as well as two Atlantics starts and drove in the Infiniti Pro Series' Freedom 100 but suffered a gearbox failure after only four laps.

=== Sports cars ===
In 2006, Moran made three starts in the Rolex Sports Car Series. He also made occasional road course appearances in the Busch North Series from 2006 to 2009.

In 2011, Moran was a Jaguar factory driver in the American Le Mans Series with RSR Racing, driving in five of the nine rounds of the championship. However, the car was plagued by mechanical problems and never finished higher than twentieth.

=== IndyCar Series ===
Moran completed his first IndyCar Series test with Schmidt Peterson Motorsports in fall of 2014 at Homestead Miami Speedway.

Shortly before the 2015 Grand Prix of Long Beach, it was announced that Moran would drive in the race with Dale Coyne Racing, stepping into the seat formerly held by Carlos Huertas. His IndyCar debut came nearly ten years after his last Atlantics start. However, he broke his thumb during contact with the wall during Friday practice and was replaced for the rest of the race weekend by Conor Daly.

== Racing record ==
=== American open-wheel racing results ===
(key)

==== Atlantic Championship ====
Year	Team	1	2	3	4	5	6	7	8	9	10	11	12	13	Rank	Points
1998	P-1 Racing	LBH	NAZ	GAT	MIL	MTL	CLE	TOR	TRR	MDO	ROA	VAN	LS	HOU; 18	NC	0
1999	P-1 Racing	LBH	NAZ	GAT	MIL	MTL	ROA	TRR; Ret	MDO; 6	CHI; 7	VAN; 9	LS; Ret	HOU; Ret		14th	18
2000	P-1 Racing	HMS1; 4	HMS2; 3	LBH; 8	MIL; 6	MTL; 6	CLE; 4	TOR; 7	TRR; 5	ROA; 6	LS; 5	GAT; 4	HOU; 5		5th	115
2001	Condor Motorsports	LBH; 10	NAZ; 6	MIL; 9	MTL; 9	CLE; 5									8th	64
2001	Cobb Racing						TOR; Ret	CHI; 7	TRR; Ret	ROA; 6	VAN; Ret	HOU	LS; 1		8th	64
2002	Sigma Autosport	MTY; 6	LBH; 5	MIL; 13	LS; 2	POR; 5	CHI; 8	TOR; 3	CLE; 5	TRR; 5	ROA; Ret	MTL; 1	DEN; 9		5th	117
2004	Polestar Motor Racing	LBH; 7	MTY; 2	MIL; 6	POR1; 9	POR2; 8	CLE	TOR	VAN	ROA	DEN	MTL	LS		11th	92
2005	P-1 Racing	LBH; Ret	MTY	POR1	POR2	CLE1	CLE2	TOR	EDM	SJO	DEN	ROA	MTL		11th^{1}	25^{1}

^{1} C2 Class

==== Indy Lights ====
Year	Team	1	2	3	4	5	6	7	8	9	10	11	12	13	14	Rank	Points
2005	AFS Racing	HMS	PHX	STP	INDY; 17	TXS	IMS	NSH	MIL	KTY	PPIR	SNM	CHI	WGL	FON	31st	13

==== IndyCar Series ====
Year	Team	No.	Chassis	Engine	1	2	3	4	5	6	7	8	9	10	11	12	13	14	15	16	Rank	Points	Ref
2015	Dale Coyne Racing	18	Dallara DW12	Honda	STP	NLA	LBH; Wth	ALA	IMS	INDY	DET	DET	TXS	TOR	FON	MIL	IOW	MDO	POC	SNM	NC	-	

* Season still in progress
