= 2000 Atlantic Championship =

2000 Toyota Atlantic Championship season
- CART Toyota Atlantic Championship

Season
- Races: 12
- Start date: March 25
- End date: October 1

Awards
- Drivers' champion: (United States) Buddy Rice

The 2000 Toyota Atlantic Championship season was contested over 12 rounds. The CART Toyota Atlantic Championship Drivers' Champion was Buddy Rice driving for PPI Motorsports. In this one-make formula all drivers had to utilize Swift chassis and Toyota engines. 20 different teams and 39 different drivers competed.

== Calendar ==
Race no	Track	State	Date	Laps	Distance	Time	Speed	Winner	Pole position	Most leading laps	Fastest race lap
1	Homestead	Florida	March 25, 2000	50	2.27313625=113.6568125 km	0'46:23.032	147.021 km/h	Dan Wheldon	Buddy Rice	Buddy Rice	?
2	Homestead	Florida	March 26, 2000	50	2.27313625=113.6568125 km	0'44:02.952	154.813 km/h	Buddy Rice	Dan Wheldon	Buddy Rice	Dan Wheldon
3	Long Beach	California	April 15, 2000	32	3.167=101.344 km	0'45:44.100	132.954 km/h	Buddy Rice	Dan Wheldon	Buddy Rice	Buddy Rice
4	Milwaukee	Wisconsin	June 3, 2000	60	1.6607976=99.647856 km	0'33:56.961	176.112 km/h	Martín Basso	Dan Wheldon	Buddy Rice	Martín Basso
5	Montréal	Canada	June 16, 2000	27	4.4207471=119.3601717 km	0'47:53.202	149.553 km/h	David Rutledge	David Rutledge	Andrew Bordin	David Rutledge
6	Cleveland	Ohio	July 2, 2000	32	3.3891858=108.4539456 km	0'44:41.771	145.588 km/h	Buddy Rice	Alex Gurney	Buddy Rice	Buddy Rice
7	Toronto	Canada	July 16, 2000	35	2.825=98.875 km	0'53:14.959	111.410 km/h	Andrew Bordin	Andrew Bordin	Andrew Bordin	Buddy Rice
8	Trois-Rivières	Canada	July 30, 2000	45	2.4477453=110.1485385 km	0'52:10.488	126.669 km/h	Buddy Rice	Buddy Rice	Buddy Rice	Buddy Rice
9	Elkhart Lake	Wisconsin	August 20, 2000	17	6.4372=109.4324 km	0'44:24.492	147.854 km/h	Buddy Rice	Martín Basso	Buddy Rice	Buddy Rice
10	Monterey	California	September 9, 2000	30	3.6016134=108.048402 km	0'40:29.847	160.082 km/h	Dan Wheldon	Dan Wheldon	Dan Wheldon	Buddy Rice
11	Madison	Illinois	September 16, 2000	50	2.011625=100.58125 km	0'25:38.830	235.307 km/h	Case Montgomery	Case Montgomery	Case Montgomery	Case Montgomery
12	Houston	Texas	October 1, 2000	43	2.4574011=105.6682473 km	0'56:08.238	112.939 km/h	Andrew Bordin	Andrew Bordin	Andrew Bordin	Andrew Bordin

Note:

Race 1 and 2 were held on combination oval/road course.

== Final points standings ==
=== Driver ===
For every race the points were awarded: 20 points to the winner, 16 for runner-up, 14 for third place, 12 for fourth place, 10 for fifth place, 8 for sixth place, 6 seventh place, winding down to 1 point for 12th place. Lower placed drivers did not award points. Additional points were awarded to the pole winner (1 point) and to the driver leading the most laps (1 point).

Place	Name	Country	Team	Total points	(United States)	(United States)	(United States)	(United States)	(Canada)	(United States)	(Canada)	(Canada)	(United States)	(United States)	(United States)	(United States)
1	Buddy Rice	United States	DSTP Motorsports	185	18	21	21	1	-	21	16	22	21	14	16	14
2	Dan Wheldon	United Kingdom	PPI Motorsports	159	20	17	13	1	14	8	14	16	16	22	6	12
3	Andrew Bordin	Canada	PPI Motorsports	133	8	12	14	16	17	2	22	-	12	-	8	22
4	Martín Basso	Argentina	Shank Racing	129	10	8	-	20	12	16	10	12	15	12	14	-
5	Rocky Moran Jr.	United States	P-1 Racing	115	12	14	5	8	8	12	6	10	8	10	12	10
6	David Rutledge	Canada	Lynx Racing	93	1	10	16	12	21	-	-	-	-	16	1	16
7	Hoover Orsi	Brazil	Hylton Motorsports	76	14	-	10	14	-	14	-	-	5	6	5	8
8	Alex Gurney	United States	All American Racers	57	-	-	3	10	6	1	5	14	10	8	-	-
9	Will Langhorne	United States	Active Motorsports	56	6	-	6	4	10	10	12	-	-	3	-	5
10	Mike Conte	United States	Lynx Racing	40	5	4	-	6	5	5	4	-	6	5	-	-
11	T. J. Bell	United States	Shank Racing	33	3	5	8	1	-	6	-	5	2	1	2	-
12	Case Montgomery	United States	World Speed Motorsports	26	-	-	-	-	-	-	-	-	-	4	22	-
13	Jean-François Veilleux	Canada	Shank Racing	21	4	3	-	-	-	-
13	Jean-François Veilleux	Canada	World Speed Motorsports	21							8	6	-	-	-	-
14	Bob Perona	United States	Cobb Racing	18	-	-	-	3	-	4	-	-	-	2	3	6
15	Bruno St. Jacques	Canada	Shank Racing	14	-	-	1	-	3	-	2	8	-	-	-	-
16	Akihiro Asai	Japan	World Speed Motorsports	12	-	-	-	-	2	-	-	-	-	-	10	-
17	Pete Mercier	United States	World Speed Motorsports	10	-	6	4	-	-	-	-	-	-	-	-	-
	Stéphan C. Roy	Canada	BBGP Racing	10	-	-	-	2	1	3	-	1	3	-	-	-
19	Frédéric Gosparini	France	Cobb Racing	8	-	-	-	-	-	-	-	4	-	-	4	-
	Dave Cutler	United States	P-1 Racing	8	-	-	-	5	-	-	-	-	-	-	-	3
21	Christophe Beauvais	Canada	RDS Motorsport	7	2	-	-	-	-	-	-	-	1	-	-	4
22	Kuno Wittmer	Canada	Hylton Motorsports	6	-	-	2	-	4	-	-	-	-	-	-	-
23	Masaoki Nagashima	Japan	P-1 Racing	5	-	-	-	-	-	-	1	2	-	-	-	2
	Andy Lally	United States	World Speed Motorsports	5	-	-	-	-	-	-	-	-	4	-	-	1
25	Rino Mastronardi	Italy	Condor Motorsports	3	-	-	-	-	-	-	3	-	-	-	-	-
	Marc-Antoine Camirand	Canada	World Speed Motorsports	3	-	-	-	-	-	-	-	3	-	-	-	-
27	Cemal Yelkin	United States	Meehan Motorsports	2	-	2	-	-	-	-	-	-	-	-	-	-
28	Tom Wieringa	United States	Active Motorsports	1	-	1	-	-	-	-	-	-	-	-	-	-
	Steve Lorenzen	United States	Pierce Motorsports	1	-	-	-	-	-	1	-	-	-	-	-	-

== Complete overview ==
first column of every race	10	= grid position

second column of every race	10	= race result

R17=retired, but classified NS=did not start

Place	Name	Country	Team	(United States)		(United States)		(United States)		(United States)		(Canada)		(United States)		(Canada)		(Canada)		(United States)		(United States)		(United States)		(United States)
1	Buddy Rice	United States	DSTP Motorsports	1	2	4	1	3	1	4	R17	2	R28	3	1	4	2	1	1	7	1	2	3	3	2	3	3
2	Dan Wheldon	United Kingdom	PPI Motorsports	2	1	1	2	1	4	1	13	5	3	5	6	2	3	3	2	5	2	1	1	4	7	5	4
3	Andrew Bordin	Canada	PPI Motorsports	5	6	7	4	2	3	3	2	3	2	4	11	1	1	2	15	6	4	4	13	7	6	1	1
4	Martín Basso	Argentina	Shank Racing	7	5	5	6	7	R21	2	1	4	4	2	2	6	5	7	4	1	3	7	4	2	3	4	R19
5	Rocky Moran Jr.	United States	P-1 Racing	8	4	3	3	10	8	7	6	6	6	9	4	8	7	9	5	11	6	5	5	6	4	11	5
6	David Rutledge	Canada	Lynx Racing	17	12	16	5	4	2	8	4	1	1	6	R19	10	R25	4	13	4	R18	3	2	5	12	2	2
7	Hoover Orsi	Brazil	Hylton Motorsports	12	3	2	R23	8	5	6	3	9	R24	8	3	7	R26	10	R21	2	8	14	7	10	8	7	6
8	Alex Gurney	United States	All American Racers	4	R24	8	R22	5	10	5	5	7	7	1	R18	5	8	5	3	21	5	8	6	18	R18	6	R16
9	William Langhorne	United States	Active Motorsports	3	7	6	NS	13	7	12	9	11	5	7	5	3	4	6	R20	9	R19	10	10	16	13	14	8
10	Mike Conte	United States	Lynx Racing	15	8	15	9	12	13	10	7	12	8	11	8	9	9	12	R19	13	7	9	8	11	14	10	R14
11	T. J. Bell	United States	Shank Racing	10	10	12	8	9	6	11	12	16	R22	13	7	17	R21	16	8	22	11	13	12	14	11	8	R13
12	Case Montgomery	United States	World Speed Motorsports	-	-	-	-	-	-	-	-	-	-	-	-	-	-	-	-	-	-	6	9	1	1	-	-
13	Jean-François Veilleux	Canada	Shank Racing	11	9	9	10	-	-	-	-	-	-	-	-
13	Jean-François Veilleux	Canada	World Speed Motorsports													11	6	14	7	-	-	-	-	-	-	-	-
14	Bob Perona	United States	Cobb Racing	9	15	13	21	11	20	13	10	8	17	16	9	15	13	11	R18	3	R16	15	11	15	10	9	7
15	Bruno St. Jacques	Canada	Shank Racing	-	-	-	-	6	12	-	-	13	10	-	-	14	11	8	6	-	-	-	-	-	-	-	-
16	Akihiro Asai	Japan	World Speed Motorsports	-	-	-	-	-	-	15	15	19	11	10	R23	12	R18	-	-	12	13	12	14	8	5	13	R18
17	Pete Mercier	United States	World Speed Motorsports	16	R19	16	7	16	9	19	R18	15	R25	12	R25	-	-	-	-	-	-	-	-	-	-	-	-
	Stéphan C. Roy	Canada	BBGP Racing	22	R18	22	16	17	R25	16	11	17	12	18	10	20	R24	15	12	15	10	19	17	-	-	17	R17
19	Frédéric Gosparini	France	Cobb Racing	-	-	-	-	-	-	-	-	-	-	-	-	-	-	17	9	8	R21	17	22	13	9	12	R20
	Dave Cutler	United States	P-1 Racing	18	R23	17	14	18	R26	9	8	24	13	22	13	18	R22	20	R22	17	14	21	18	12	15	20	10
21	Christophe Beauvais	Canada	RDS Motorsport	20	11	21	13	22	15	17	16	21	14	14	R24	21	14	21	R17	20	12	24	R25	17	17	19	9
22	Kuno Wittmer	Canada	Hylton Motorsports	14	R20	11	18	14	11	-	-	10	9	-	-	-	-	-	-	-	-	-	-	-	-	-	-
23	Masaoki Nagashima	Japan	P-1 Racing	6	R22	14	15	15	17	14	14	14	20	17	14	16	12	18	11	14	15	16	R24	9	16	15	R11
	Andy Lally	United States	World Speed Motorsports	-	-	-	-	-	-	-	-	-	-	-	-	-	-	-	-	10	9	-	-	-	-	16	R12
25	Rino Mastronardi	Italy	Condor Motorsports	-	-	-	-	-	-	-	-	-	-	-	-	13	10	-	-	-	-	11	19	-	-	-	-
	Marc-Antoine Camirand	Canada	World Speed Motorsports	-	-	-	-	-	-	-	-	-	-	-	-	-	-	13	10	-	-	-	-	-	-	-	-
27	Cemal Yelkin	United States	Meehan Motorsports	13	R21	20	11	20	R24	-	-	18	R26	15	17	19	R19	22	R24	16	R17	-	-	-	-	-	-
28	Tom Wieringa	United States	Active Motorsports	19	R17	18	12	19	16	-	-	26	R23	-	-	-	-	-	-	-	-	-	-	-	-	-	-
	Steve Lorenzen	United States	Pierce Motorsports	-	-	-	-	25	19	-	-	22	19	21	12	25	R20	23	16	-	-	20	16	-	-	-	-
-	Sergei Szortyka	United States	J&J Racing	24	13	23	20	-	-	-	-	23	16	23	16	23	R23	-	-	-	-	-	-	-	-	-	-
-	Cam Binder	Canada	Binder Racing	-	-	-	-	21	14	-	-	20	18	-	-	22	15	19	14	-	-	-	-	-	-	-	-
-	Joey Scarallo	Australia	Condor Motorsports	21	14	19	17	24	R22	18	R19	27	15	20	R21	-	-	-	-	-	-	-	-	-	-	-	-
-	Eric Jensen	Canada	Jensen Motorsports	-	-	-	-	23	18	-	-	25	R21	-	-	26	16	-	-	18	R22	23	20	-	-	18	R15
-	Bob Siska	United States	RJS Motorsport	-	-	-	-	-	-	-	-	28	R27	24	15	24	17	24	R23	19	R20	25	21	-	-	-	-
-	Stan d'Oultremont	Puerto Rico	Shank Racing	-	-	-	-	-	-	-	-	-	-	-	-	-	-	-	-	-	-	18	15	-	-	-	-
-	Imran Husain	India	Condor Motorsports	23	16	24	19	26	R23	-	-	-	-	-	-	-	-	-	-	-	-	-	-	-	-	-	-
-	Ted Sahley	United States	Shank Racing	-	-	-	-	-	-	-	-	-	-	19	R20	-	-	-	-	-	-	-	-	-	-	-	-
-	DeWayne Cassel	United States	Olsson Engineering	-	-	-	-	-	-	-	-	-	-	25	R22	-	-	-	-	-	-	-	-	-	-	-	-
-	Bakir Begovic	United States	Cobb Racing	-	-	-	-	-	-	-	-	-	-	-	-	-	-	-	-	-	-	22	R23	-	-	-	-

== See also ==
- 2000 CART season
- 2000 Indianapolis 500
- 2000 Indy Racing League season
- 2000 Indy Lights season
