= Alan Fogarty =

Irish water polo player

Personal information
- Born: Dublin, Ireland

Sport
- Sport: Water polo

Alan Fogarty is an Irish water polo player. He was a member of the Irish Water Polo Association's Senior Men's International Team but is currently retired from International Water Polo. He still plays for the Senior Division 1 team at Sandycove Swimming and Water Polo club in Dublin.
