= 2002 Atlantic Championship =

2002 Toyota Atlantic Championship season
- CART Toyota Atlantic Championship

Season
- Races: 12
- Start date: March 9th
- End date: August 31st

Awards
- Drivers' champion: (United States) Jon Fogarty
- Teams' champion: (United States) Dorricott Racing

The 2002 Toyota Atlantic Championship season was contested over 12 rounds. The CART Toyota Atlantic Championship Drivers' Champion was Jon Fogarty driving for Dorricott Racing. In this one-make formula all drivers had to utilize Swift chassis and Toyota engines. 20 different teams and 38 different drivers competed.

== Calendar ==
Race No	Track	State	Date	Laps	Distance	Time	Speed	Winner	Friday fastest	Saturday fastest	Most leading laps	Fastest race lap
1	Monterrey	Mexico	March 9, 2002	32	3.385=108.32 km	0'59:54.202	108.495 km/h	Jon Fogarty	Luis Díaz	**Luis Díaz**	Jon Fogarty	Alex Figge
2	Long Beach	California	April 14, 2002	29	3.167=91.843 km	0'54:22.440	101.346 km/h	Michael Valiante	Ryan Hunter-Reay	**Joey Hand**	Alex Gurney	Ryan Hunter-Reay
3	Milwaukee	Wisconsin	June 2, 2002	70	1.6607976=116.255832 km	0'31:40.803	220.181 km/h	Roger Yasukawa	**Ryan Hunter-Reay**		Ryan Hunter-Reay	Ryan Hunter-Reay
4	Monterey	California	June 8, 2002	30	3.6016134=108.048402 km	0'42:31.736	152.435 km/h	Ryan Hunter-Reay	**Ryan Hunter-Reay**	Ryan Hunter-Reay	Ryan Hunter-Reay	Ryan Hunter-Reay
5	Portland	Oregon	June 15, 2002	35	3.169=110.915 km	0'40:04.588	166.055 km/h	Luis Díaz	Jon Fogarty	**Luis Díaz**	Luis Díaz	Luis Díaz
6	Cicero	Illinois	June 30, 2002	70	1.6559697=115.917879 km	0'42:00.602	165.557 km/h	Ryan Hunter-Reay	**Jon Fogarty**		Ryan Hunter-Reay	Ryan Hunter-Reay
7	Toronto	Canada	July 6, 2002	35	2.825=98.875 km	0'44:50.056	132.321 km/h	Michael Valiante	**Jon Fogarty**	Alex Gurney	Michael Valiante	Michael Valiante
8	Cleveland	Ohio	July 14, 2002	32	3.3891858=108.4539456 km	0'38:30.860	168.956 km/h	Ryan Hunter-Reay	Jon Fogarty	**Ryan Hunter-Reay**	Ryan Hunter-Reay	Michael Valiante
9	Trois-Rivières	Canada	August 4, 2002	45	2.4477453=110.1485385 km	0'49:07.433	134.536 km/h	Michael Valiante	Alex Gurney	**Michael Valiante**	Michael Valiante	Michael Valiante
10	Elkhart Lake	Wisconsin	August 18, 2002	17	6.4372=109.4324 km	0'47:57.100	136.928 km/h	Luis Díaz	**Jon Fogarty**	Michael Valiante	Jon Fogarty	Luis Díaz
11	Montréal	Canada	August 24, 2002	27	4.360=117.72 km	0'51:36.852	136.846 km/h	Rocky Moran Jr.	Michael Valiante	**Jon Fogarty**	Jon Fogarty	Luis Díaz
12	Denver	Colorado	August 31, 2002	38	2.6505171=100.7196498 km	0'51:42.928	116.854 km/h	Jon Fogarty	Alex Gurney	**Ryan Dalziel**	Jon Fogarty	Ryan Dalziel

bold indicate pole position

== Final points standings ==
=== Driver ===
For every race the points were awarded: 20 points to the winner, 16 for runner-up, 14 for third place, 12 for fourth place, 10 for fifth place, 8 for sixth place, 6 seventh place, winding down to 1 point for 12th place. Lower placed drivers did not award points. Additional points were awarded to the fastest qualifier on Friday (1 point), the fastest qualifier on Saturday (1 point) and to the driver leading the most laps (1 point). Oval races only saw one qualifying.

Place	Name	Country	Team	Total points	(Mexico)	(United States)	(United States)	(United States)	(United States)	(United States)	(Canada)	(United States)	(Canada)	(United States)	(Canada)	(United States)
1	Jon Fogarty	United States	Dorricott Racing	161	21	14	11	-	15	13	1	17	12	18	18	21
2	Michael Valiante	Canada	Lynx Racing	150	12	20	9	11	7	14	16	12	22	13	10	4
3	Alex Gurney	United States	Dorricott Racing	132	-	17	12	10	10	6	12	8	17	14	11	15
4	Luis Díaz	Mexico	Dorricott Racing	124	13	5	7	2	22	10	-	14	10	20	10	10
5	Rocky Moran Jr.	United States	Sigma Autosport	117	10	11	3	16	11	8	9	11	11	-	20	7
6	Ryan Hunter-Reay	United States	Hylton Motorsports	102	-	1	2	23	12	21	12	22	9	-	-	-
7	Jonathan Macri	Canada	P-1 Racing	96	8	-	14	-	16	9	16	9	-	9	4	11
8	Ryan Dalziel	United Kingdom	Shank Racing	89	16	-	6	12	9	1	-	7	-	7	14
8	Ryan Dalziel	United Kingdom	Hylton Motorsports	89												17
9	Rodolfo Lavín	Mexico	Shank Racing	76	9	5	16	9	4	7	8	5	8	-	5	-
10	Roger Yasukawa	United States	Hylton Motorsports	73	-	9	20	14	8	16	-	-	-	6	-	-
11	Waldemar Coronas	Argentina	Scuderia Fortia	61	6	7	8	-	6	11	-	10	-	1	-	12
12	Joey Hand	United States	DSTP Motorsports	45	14	1	-	-	-	-	-	-	7	11	12	-
13	Grant Ryley	United States	Lynx Racing	43	4	12	5	-	-	3	-	6	3	10	-	-
14	Sepp Koster	Netherlands	Shank Racing	40	3	8	-	7	-	-	-	-	6	-	8	8
15	Stéphan Roy	Canada	BBGP Racing	35	-	10	-	5	3	2	9	2	-	4	-	-
16	Dave Wieringa	United States	Sigma Autosport	32	-	-	1	-	2	4	6	4	2	5	3	5
17	Buddy Rice	United States	DSTP Motorsports	31	-	-	-	8	5	5	10	3	-	-	-	-
18	Alex Figge	United States	World Speed Motorsports	30	5	-	10	3	-	-	-	-	5	-	6	1
19	Frank Dancs	United States	Condor Motorsports-Ariba	24	-	-	2	4	-	-	3	-	-	2	7	6
20	Nicolas Rondet	France	Condor Motorsports-Ariba	20	-	2	-	6	1	-	7	-	1	3	-	-
21	Aaron Justus	United States	Performance Development & Racing	17	-	-	-	-	-	-	-	-	-	8	-	9
22	Marc DeVellis	Canada	Sierra Sierra Racing	16	-	-	-	-	-	-	-	-	14	-	-	2
23	Carl Russo	United States	Performance Development & Racing	8	-	3	-	-	-	-	5	-	-	-	-	-
24	Derek Higgins	Ireland	P-1 Racing	7	7	-	-	-	-	-	-	-	-	-	-	-
25	Hugo Oliveras	Mexico	Condor Motorsports-Ariba	6	2	4	-	-	-	-	-	-	-	-	-	-
	Dave Cutler	United States	P-1 Racing	6	-	-	4	1	-	-	1	-	-	-	-	-
	Alex García	Venezuela	Transnet Racing	6	-	1	-	-	-	-	-	-	4	-	1	-
	Kyle Krisiloff	United States	Patrick Racing	6	-	-	-	-	-	-	2	1	-	-	-	3
29	Eduardo Figueroa	Mexico	Scuderia Fortia	4	-	-	-	-	-	-	4	-	-	-	-	-
30	Bruno St. Jacques	Canada	Shank Racing	2	-	-	-	-	-	-	-	-	-	-	2	-
31	David Martínez	Mexico	Condor Motorsports-Ariba	1	1	-	-	-	-	-	-	-	-	-	-	-

Note:

Race 7 Michael Valiante had 5 points deduction, because he had shortcutted the course.

Race 7 Rocky Moran Jr. was originally disqualified, but after Race 8 the decision was reverted to a 5 points deduction.

Race 3 and 6 only one additional point - oval races.

== Complete Overview ==
first column of every race	10	= grid position

second column of every race	10	= race result

R22=retired, but classified NS=did not start NQ=did not qualify NT=no time set in qualifying (15)=place after practice, but grid position not held free

Place	Name	Country	Team	(Mexico)		(United States)		(United States)		(United States)		(United States)		(United States)		(Canada)		(United States)		(Canada)		(United States)		(Canada)		(United States)
1	Jon Fogarty	United States	Dorricott Racing	4	1	4	3	6	5	4	R22	2	3	1	4	1	R22	2	2	4	4	1	2	1	2	4	1
2	Michael Valiante	Canada	Lynx Racing	7	4	3	1	17	7	15	5	8	9	3	3	6	1	5	4	1	1	2	4	2	7	6	12
3	Alex Gurney	United States	Dorricott Racing	3	R22	5	2	3	4	3	6	4	6	13	10	2	5	7	8	2	2	4	3	9	5	3	R23
4	Luis Díaz	Mexico	Dorricott Racing	1	5	6	10	9	9	7	14	1	1	7	6	4	R23	4	3	8	6	3	1	4	6	15	6
5	Rocky Moran Jr.	United States	Sigma Autosport	8	6	9	5	8	13	5	2	5	5	8	8	9	3	6	5	11	5	6	R20	5	1	8	9
6	Ryan Hunter-Reay	United States	Hylton Motorsports	6	R23	2	18	1	R19	1	1	9	4	6	1	7	4	1	1	15	7	8	R24	6	22	-	-
7	Jonathan Marci	Canada	P-1 Racing	13	8	7	19	4	3	2	R20	3	2	10	7	5	2	11	7	7	R24	14	7	11	12	11	5
8	Ryan Dalziel	United Kingdom	Shank Racing	10	2	10	R27	5	10	9	4	6	7	11	15	8	R19	8	9	13	R23	10	9	3	3
8	Ryan Dalziel	United Kingdom	Hylton Motorsports																							1	2
9	Rodolfo Lavín	Mexico	Shank Racing	9	7	11	11	7	2	12	7	16	12	12	9	14	8	12	11	14	8	13	R21	15	11	(15)	NS
10	Roger Yasukawa	United States	Hylton Motorsports	-	-	12	7	2	1	8	3	7	8	5	2	12	R26	13	21	6	R25	11	10	-	-	-	-
11	Waldemar Coronas	Argentina	Scuderia Fortia	12	10	13	9	12	8	14	R25	11	10	16	5	13	R25	3	6	12	R22	5	15	10	R24	7	4
12	Joey Hand	United States	DSTP Motorsports	2	3	1	R25	-	-	-	-	-	-	-	-	-	-	-	-	5	9	9	5	8	4	5	R25
13	Grant Ryley	United States	Lynx Racing	14	12	8	4	14	11	11	R21	13	R23	15	13	11	R20	10	10	3	13	7	6	14	R26	10	R21
14	Sepp Koster	Netherlands	Shank Racing	15	13	15	8	22	NS	6	9	12	21	20	R19	3	R24	9	R23	9	10	-	-	13	8	9	8
15	Stéphan Roy	Canada	BBGP Racing	-	-	14	6	16	NS	19	11	17	13	23	14	17	7	18	14	17	R27	20	12	20	R25	-	-
16	Dave Wieringa	United States	Sigma Autosport	18	16	-	-	10	15	18	18	15	14	14	12	19	10	16	12	19	14	15	11	21	13	17	11
17	Buddy Rice	United States	DSTP Motorsports	-	-	-	-	-	-	13	8	10	11	4	11	10	6	15	13	-	-	-	-	-	-	-	-
18	Alex Figge	United States	World Speed Motorsports	11	11	16	R23	13	6	10	13	14	R24	2	R21	15	R18	14	R24	16	11	16	17	22	10	16	15
19	Frank Dancs	United States	Condor Motorsports-Ariba	17	18	17	R26	15	14	16	12	18	R22	19	16	18	13	17	16	21	20	17	14	16	9	13	10
20	Nicolas Rondet	France	Condor Motorsports-Ariba	-	-	20	14	19	18	17	10	19	15	22	R22	16	9	20	R22	20	15	21	13	23	17	20	R22
21	Aaron Justus	United States	Performance Development & Racing	-	-	-	-	-	-	-	-	-	-	-	-	-	-	-	-	-	-	12	8	12	R23	18	7
22	Marc DeVellis	Canada	Sierra Sierra Racing	-	-	-	-	-	-	-	-	-	-	-	-	-	-	-	-	10	3	-	-	7	R28	12	14
23	Carl Russo	United States	Performance Development & Racing	22	17	24	13	21	16	-	-	21	18	17	18	21	11	23	19	25	R26	23	18	24	R21	22	R24
24	Derek Higgins	Ireland	P-1 Racing	5	9	-	-	-	-	-	-	-	-	-	-	-	-	-	-	-	-	-	-	-	-	-	-
25	Hugo Oliveras	Mexico	Condor Motorsports-Ariba	16	14	18	12	-	-	-	-	-	-	-	-	-	-	-	-	-	-	-	-	-	-	-	-
	Dave Cutler	United States	P-1 Racing	23	20	25	16	11	12	21	15	22	17	9	R20	23	15	22	20	24	17	24	16	25	18	23	R19
	Alex García	Venezuela	Transnet Racing	21	19	23	15	20	R20	23	17	(21)	NS	18	R23	22	R21	21	17	18	12	19	R25	19	15	19	16
	Kyle Krisiloff	United States	Patrick Racing	-	-	-	-	-	-	-	-	-	-	-	-	24	14	19	15	22	18	22	R23	17	16	14	13
29	Eduardo Figueroa	Mexico	Scuderia Fortia	20	21	22	R24	18	17	24	R24	23	19	21	17	20	12	24	18	23	16	18	R22	NT	-	2	3
30	Bruno St. Jacques	Canada	Shank Racing	-	-	-	-	-	-	-	-	-	-	-	-	-	-	-	-	-	-	-	-	18	14	-	-
31	David Martínez	Mexico	Condor Motorsports-Ariba	19	15	-	-	-	-	-	-	-	-	-	-	-	-	-	-	-	-	-	-	-	-	-	-
-	Steve Romak	United States	Auto Spa	-	-	19	17	-	-	20	16	20	16	-	-	-	-	-	-	-	-	-	-	-	-	-	-
-	Bob Siska	United States	RJS Motorsports	-	-	27	20	-	-	25	R23	-	-	-	-	26	16	25	NQ	27	21	25	19	28	R27	25	17
-	Eric Jensen	Canada	Starwood Team Jensen	-	-	-	-	-	-	-	-	-	-	-	-	25	R17	NT	-	26	19	-	-	27	19	24	R20
-	Cam Binder	Canada	Starwood Team Jensen	-	-	-	-	-	-	-	-	-	-	-	-	-	-	-	-	-	-	-	-	29	NQ	21	R18
-	Scott Lampkin	United States	Crossover Motorsports	-	-	26	22	-	-	26	19	-	-	-	-	-	-	-	-	-	-	-	-	26	20	-	-
-	DeWayne Cassel	United States	JPT Motorsports	-	-	-	-	-	-	-	-	24	20	-	-	-	-	26	NQ	-	-	-	-	-	-	-	-
-	Víctor González Jr.	Puerto Rico	BBGP Racing	-	-	21	21	-	-	-	-	-	-	-	-	-	-	-	-	-	-	-	-	-	-	-	-

== See also ==
- 2002 CART season
- 2002 Indianapolis 500
- 2002 Indy Racing League season
- 2002 Infiniti Pro Series season
