= Joyce Growing Thunder Fogarty =

Native American artist

- Born: Joyce Growing Thunder; 1950 (age 74–75); Fort Peck Indian Reservation, Popular, Montana, U.S.
- Citizenship: Assiniboine and Sioux Tribes of the Fort Peck Indian Reservation, United States
- Known for: Beadwork and Quillwork
- Children: Juanita Growing Thunder Fogarty
- Relatives: Tahnee Ahtoneharjo-Growingthunder (daughter in-law)

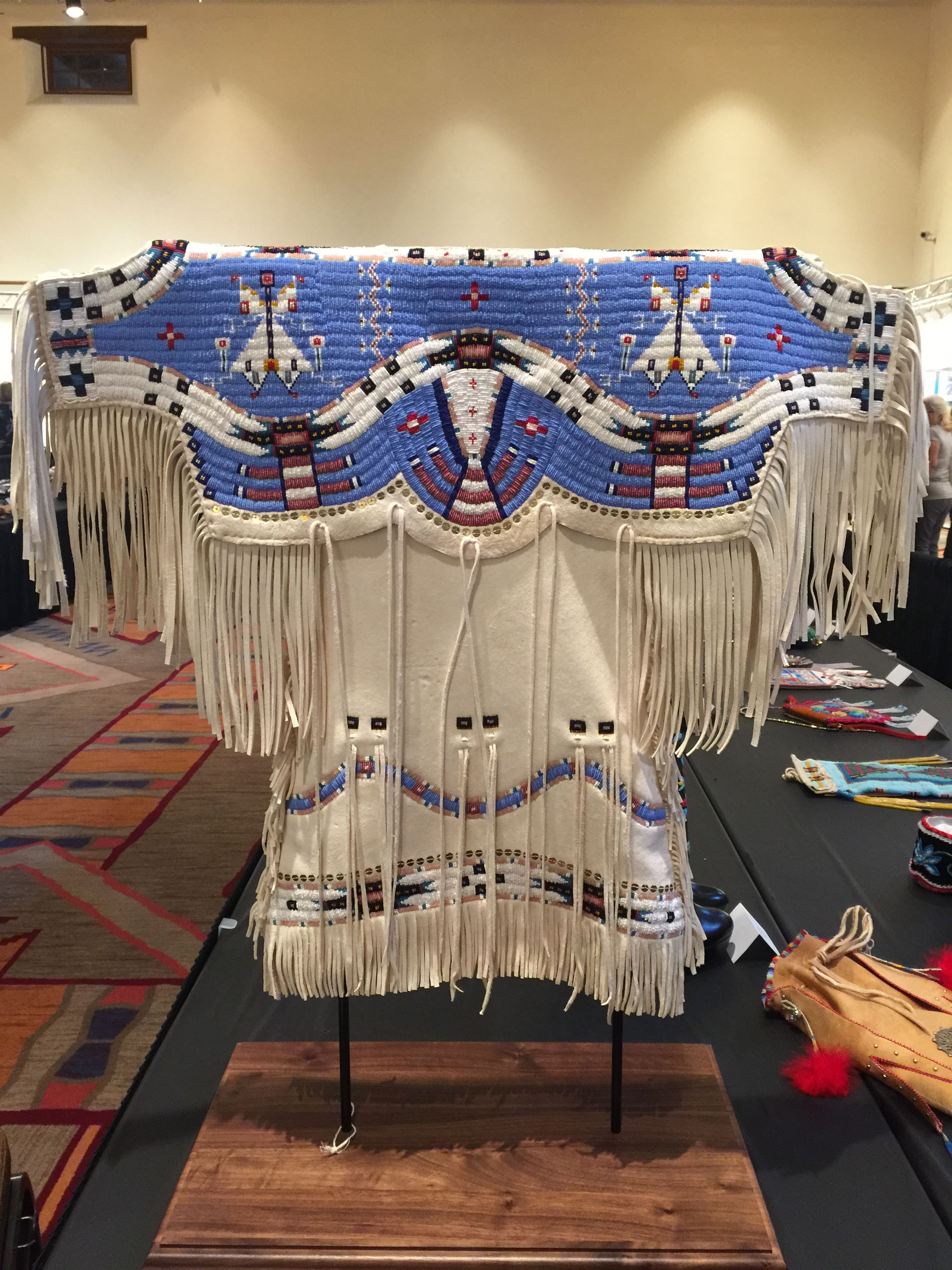
Give Away Horses dress (2006) created by the Growing Thunder Fogarty family

Joyce Growing Thunder Fogarty (born 1950), is a Native American artist. She is of the Assiniboine Sioux, Dakota people, and is known for her beadwork and quillwork. She creates traditional Northern Plains regalia. The Smithsonian named her as "one of the West's most highly regarded beadworkers".

== Background ==
Joyce Growing Thunder Fogarty was born in Poplar, Montana, on the Fort Peck Indian Reservation. She started beading and sewing as a child taught by her grandmothers on the reservation. Throughout her life she created artistic works using traditional designs of Plains Indians, and became the matriarch of a family with many beadwork artisans, including her daughter, Juanita Growing Thunder Fogarty, and granddaughter, Jessica "Jessa Rae".

== Artwork ==
Joyce Growing Thunder Fogarty is the only artist to have won the "Best of Show" three times at the Santa Fe Indian Market. She has created over 500 dresses in her lifetime; other works include cradleboards, dance outfits, horse masks, and dolls. Growing Thunder Fogarty's works are created with seed bead, and organic materials such as horse hair, brain-tanned leather, earth pigments, and other natural materials. Her dolls are finely detailed and embody tribal specific and familial significant designs.

Growing Thunder Fogarty's work can be found in permanent museum collections including, the Smithsonian's National Museum of the American Indian, Metropolitan Museum of Art, Ralph T. Coe Foundation, Fenimore Art Museum, the Nelson-Atkins Museum of Art, and more. Her work is featured in books Identity by Design: Tradition, Change, and Celebration in Native Women's Dresses, and The Responsive Eye: Ralph T. Coe and the Collecting of American Indian Art.

== See also ==
- List of Native American artists
- Visual arts by indigenous peoples of the Americas
