= Molson Indy Montreal =

Coordinates: 45°30′2.08″N 73°31′20.86″W

IndyCar / CART / Champ Car
- Venue: Circuit Gilles Villeneuve, Montreal, Quebec, Canada
- First race: 1984
- Last race: 2006
- Distance: 181.503 mi
- Laps: 67 laps
- Previous names: Molson Indy 300 (1984–1986); Molson Indy Montreal (2002–2005); Grand Prix of Montreal (2006)
- Most wins (driver): no repeat winners
- Most wins (team): Newman/Haas Racing (3)
- Most wins (manufacturer): Lola (6)

The Molson Indy Montreal was an annual auto race in Montreal, Quebec on the Champ Car World Series calendar.

== History ==
Originally known as the Molson Indy 300, it was first held at Sanair Super Speedway, an oval track, from 1984 through 1986. The Champ Car series revived the race in 2002, and it was held in late August each year until 2006 at the Circuit Gilles Villeneuve, a permanent road course most famous as the home of the Formula One Canadian Grand Prix.

In 2006, the name of the race was changed to the Grand Prix of Montreal after its sale by Molson Sports & Entertainment. This mirrored the name change of the Toronto Champ Car race from the Molson Indy Toronto to the Molson Grand Prix of Toronto after its sale by Molson.

=== 1985 finish controversy ===
In the 1985 Sanair race, Roberto Guerrero had a strong lead until he lost control and spun. Later in the race Jacques Villeneuve Sr. collided with leader Bobby Rahal in an attempt to challenge for the lead, taking both out. The race finished under a yellow flag, but the safety car entered pit lane on the final lap, and thinking there would be a final restart, Pancho Carter passed Johnny Rutherford after the safety car entered pit lane and before the finish line. CART initially declared Carter the winner, but an appeals panel later overturned the decision and confirmed Rutherford's victory. In many codes of motorsport (typically FIA Code) the safety car enters pit lane as the field is on the final lap, and the cars cross the checkered flag together without the safety car on course. However, this practice is not accepted in North America, where the safety car leads the leaders to the finish line if the caution flag is still in effect.

=== Future prospects ===
After the 2006 race, the future of the Grand Prix of Montreal became shrouded in doubt. The Circuit Gilles Villeneuve is allowed to be used for one race weekend outside of the Canadian Grand Prix, and it was heavily speculated that from 2007 onwards, Canadian Grand Prix promoter Normand Legault (who promotes all races at CGV) would replace the Grand Prix of Montreal with a NASCAR Busch Series race. Champ Car announced in September 2006 that it would indeed not be returning to Circuit Gilles Villeneuve and would be replacing the event with one at Circuit Mont-Tremblant (2007 Mont-Tremblant Champ Car Grand Prix, previously held 1968–1970). Circuit Gilles-Villeneuve replaced the race with the NASCAR NAPA Auto Parts 200 race.

== Race winners ==
=== Sanair (1984–1986) ===
Season	Winning driver	Chassis	Engine	Team	Report	Ref
1984	(United States) Danny Sullivan	Lola	Cosworth	Doug Shierson Racing	report	
1985	(United States) Johnny Rutherford	March	Cosworth	Alex Morales Autosports	report	
1986	(United States) Bobby Rahal	March	Cosworth	Truesports	report	

=== Circuit Gilles Villeneuve (2002–2006) ===
Season	Winning driver	Chassis	Engine	Team	Report	Ref
2002	(United Kingdom) Dario Franchitti	Lola	Honda	Team Green	report	
2003	(Mexico) Michel Jourdain Jr.	Lola	Ford-Cosworth	Team Rahal	report	
2004	(Brazil) Bruno Junqueira	Lola	Ford-Cosworth	Newman/Haas Racing	report	
2005	(Spain) Oriol Servia	Lola	Ford-Cosworth	Newman/Haas Racing	report	
2006	(France) Sébastien Bourdais	Lola	Ford-Cosworth	Newman/Haas Racing	report	

=== Formula Atlantic winners ===
These races were held at Circuit Gilles Villeneuve.

Season	Winning driver
1978	(United States) Jeff Wood
1979	(United States) Howdy Holmes
1980	(Canada) Jacques Villeneuve
1981	(United States) Kevin Cogan
1982	(United States) Tim Coconis
1983	(Brazil) Roberto Moreno
1986	(Canada) Scott Goodyear
1988	(United States) Scott Harrington
1989	(Canada) Scott Goodyear
1990	(United States) Jocko Cunningham
1991	(United States) Jimmy Vasser
1992	(United States) Chris Smith
1993	(Canada) Jacques Villeneuve
1994	(United States) Richie Hearn
1995	(Canada) David Empringham
1996	(Canada) Patrick Carpentier
1997	(Canada) Bertrand Godin
1998	(Canada) Lee Bentham
1999	(Canada) Alex Tagliani
2000	(Canada) David Rutledge
2001	(Canada) David Rutledge
2002	(United States) Rocky Moran Jr.
2003	(United States) A. J. Allmendinger
2004	(United States) Jon Fogarty
2005	(Canada) Antoine Bessette
2006	(United States) Graham Rahal

== Attendance ==
Year	Race day	Weekend
2002	64,000	172,000
2003	58,000	148,000
2004	53,320	133,726
2005	36,204	93,755
2006		110,030

== See also ==
- Molson Indy Toronto
- Molson Indy Vancouver
- List of Indycar races
