= Juanita Growing Thunder Fogarty =

Native American Assiniboine Sioux bead worker and porcupine quill worker

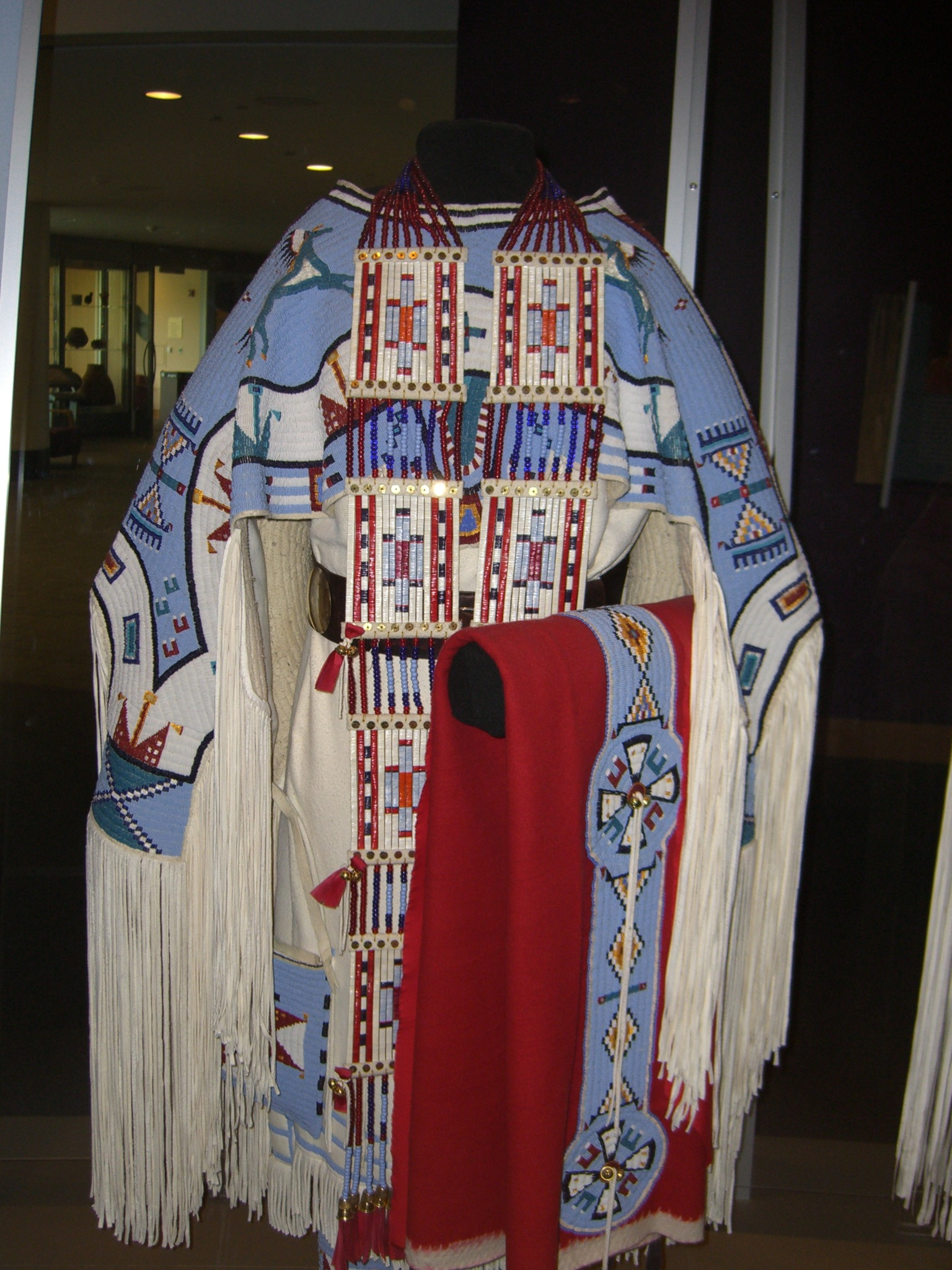
- Give Away Horses dress (2006) created by Fogarty and her relatives. In the collection of the National Museum of the American Indian.
- Born: 1969 (age 55–56); Castro Valley, California, U.S.
- Citizenship: Assiniboine and Sioux Tribes of the Fort Peck Indian Reservation, United States
- Education: Family, self-taught
- Known for: Beadwork, Quillwork
- Movement: Traditional

Juanita Growing Thunder Fogarty (born 1969) is a Native American, Assiniboine Sioux bead worker and porcupine quill worker. She creates traditional Northern Plains regalia.

== Background ==
Juanita Growing Thunder Fogarty was born in Castro Valley, California in 1969; however, her family comes from the Fort Peck Indian Reservation, where Juanita spent much of her childhood.

Her mother, Joyce Growing Thunder Fogarty, is also an acclaimed bead and quill artist and the only artist to have won best of show three times at the Santa Fe Indian Market. Both artists come from a long line of Plains Indians bead workers. Juanita learned skills from her mother and has been beading since the age of three. At times Juanita will work with her mother Joyce, and her daughter Jessica "Jessa Rae" together beading for larger regalia projects.

== Artwork ==
Fogarty creates traditional Plains clothing and accessories, such as purses, pipe bags, dolls, cradle boards, rifle scabbards, and knife cases – all adorned with beadwork or porcupine quill embroidery.

Her quillwork is labor-intensive. She gathers her own quills from freshly killed porcupines, then washes and dyes them. She uses both synthetic and natural dyes, such as bloodroot, blackberries, and wolf moss. Sorting the quills by color and size is the lengthiest step in the process. The quills are then softened in a bath of warm water, and Fogarty flattens them with her own teeth. She then appliqués or wraps the quills to moose or deer hide to create intricate patterns.

The designs of her artwork are both abstract and realistic and are based on nature, daily life, and the mythology of her tribes. She says that traditional designs of her tribe would, "reflect what the people saw, and what they had going on in their lives at the time ... maybe somebody in their family had gone to war or battle."

Fogarty has won best of class four times at the Santa Fe Indian Market. She also dances at powwows in regalia created by her family over the course of seven years. As of 2006, she lived in North San Juan, California.

Her work is in various permanent museum collections, including the Metropolitan Museum of Art, the Smithsonian's National Museum of the American Indian, and more.

In 2019, her piece Give Away Horses (created in collaboration with her mother and daughter) was included in the exhibition "Heart of Our People: Native Women Artists" at the Minneapolis Institute of Art.

== See also ==
- List of Native American artists
- Visual arts by indigenous peoples of the Americas
