= Fogerty =

Fogerty is a surname. Notable people with the surname include:

- Adam Fogerty (born 1969), English boxer, rugby league footballer and actor; son of Terry
- Elsie Fogerty (1865–1945), British drama teacher
- John Fogerty (born 1945), American singer, former member of Creedence Clearwater Revival
- Terry Fogerty (1944–2013), English rugby league footballer; father of Adam
- Tom Fogerty (1941–1990), American singer, former member of Creedence Clearwater Revival and elder brother of John

== See also ==
- John Fogerty (album), a 1975 eponymous solo album by John Fogerty
- Fogerty v. Fantasy a copyright litigation case in the United States Supreme Court involving John Fogerty
- Fogarty
