= 2001 Atlantic Championship =

2001 Toyota Atlantic Championship season
- CART Toyota Atlantic Championship

Season
- Races: 12
- Start date: April 7th
- End date: October 13th

Awards
- Drivers' champion: (Brazil) Hoover Orsi
- Teams' champion: (United States) P-1 Racing

The 2001 Toyota Atlantic Championship season was contested over 12 rounds. The CART Toyota Atlantic Championship Drivers' Champion was Hoover Orsi driving for Hylton Motorsports. In this one-make formula all drivers had to utilize Swift chassis and Toyota engines. 20 different teams and 41 different drivers competed.

== Calendar ==
Race No	Track	State	Date	Laps	Distance	Time	Speed	Winner	Pole position	Most leading laps	Fastest race lap
1	Long Beach	California	April 7, 2001	32	3.167=101.344 km	0'46:38.049	130.390 km/h	David Rutledge	David Rutledge	David Rutledge	David Rutledge
2	Nazareth	Pennsylvania	May 6, 2001	65	1.5223978=98.955857 km	0'36:55.517	160.794 km/h	Tony Ave	Tony Ave	Tony Ave	Rodolfo Lavín
3	Milwaukee	Wisconsin	June 3, 2001	65	1.6607976=107.951844 km	0'40:48.223	158.738 km/h	Hoover Orsi	Grant Ryley	Hoover Orsi	Grant Ryley
4	Montréal	Canada	June 9, 2001	27	4.4207471=119.3601717 km	0'44:04.752	162.471 km/h	David Rutledge	David Rutledge	David Rutledge	Michael Valiante
5	Cleveland	Ohio	July 1, 2001	32	3.3891858=108.4539456 km	1'00:08.041	108.212 km/h	Hoover Orsi	Martín Basso	Hoover Orsi	Joey Hand
6	Toronto	Canada	July 14, 2001	35	2.825=98.875 km	0'43:36.256	136.053 km/h	David Rutledge	David Rutledge	David Rutledge	Martín Basso
7	Cicero	Illinois	July 29, 2001	65	1.6559697=107.6380305 km	0'31:20.652	206.044 km/h	Hoover Orsi	Hoover Orsi	Hoover Orsi	Tony Ave
8	Trois-Rivières	Canada	August 5, 2001	45	2.4477453=110.1485385 km	0'46:28.841	142.186 km/h	Hoover Orsi	Hoover Orsi	Hoover Orsi	David Rutledge
9	Elkhart Lake	Wisconsin	August 19, 2001	17	6.4372=109.4324 km	0'36:52.047	178.096 km/h	Hoover Orsi	Hoover Orsi	Hoover Orsi	Jonathan Macri
10	Vancouver	Canada	September 2, 2001	38	2.8661633=108.9142054 km	0'47:51.305	136.555 km/h	Joey Hand	Hoover Orsi	Joey Hand	David Rutledge
11	Houston	Texas	October 7, 2001	43	2.4574011=105.6682473 km	0'54:27.015	116.438 km/h	Joey Hand	Martín Basso	Joey Hand	Joey hand
12	Monterey	California	October 13, 2001	30	3.6016134=108.048402 km	0'49:06.031	132.033 km/h	Rocky Moran Jr.	Joey Hand	Rocky Moran Jr.	Jonathan Macri

== Final points standings ==
=== Driver ===
For every race the points were awarded: 20 points to the winner, 16 for runner-up, 14 for third place, 12 for fourth place, 10 for fifth place, 8 for sixth place, 6 seventh place, winding down to 1 point for 12th place. Lower placed drivers did not award points. Additional points were awarded to the pole winner (1 point) and to the driver leading the most laps (1 point).

Place	Name	Country	Team	Total points	(United States)	(United States)	(United States)	(Canada)	(United States)	(Canada)	(United States)	(Canada)	(United States)	(Canada)	(United States)	(United States)
1	Hoover Orsi	Brazil	Hylton Motorsports	187	16	16	21	-	21	16	22	22	22	1	16	14
2	David Rutledge	Canada	PPI Motorsports	131	22	6	14	22	8	22	1	14	-	4	14	4
3	Joey Hand	United States	DSTP Motorsports	129	14	4	1	-	16	10	3	8	14	21	21	17
4	Martín Basso	Argentina	Shank Racing	110	8	5	5	14	7	12	10	16	10	12	1	10
5	Jonathan Macri	Canada	P-1 Racing	93	5	12	8	2	4	4	8	10	16	-	12	12
6	Tony Ave	United States	P-1 Racing	81	10	21	12	10	-	-	16	-	-	6	-	6
7	Rodolfo Lavín	Mexico	Shank Racing	69	6	14	-	-	2	5	12	6	5	10	1	8
8	Michael Valiante	Canada	Lynx Racing	64	12	-	-	16	-	8	-	12	-	16	-	-
	Rocky Moran Jr.	United States	Condor Motorsports	64	3	8	4	4	10
	Rocky Moran Jr.	United States	Cobb Racing	64						-	6	-	8	-	-	21
10	Grant Ryley	United States	World Speed Motorsports	61	-	2	17	5	-	14	5	4	-	1	8	5
11	Tim J. Bell	United States	Cobb Racing	54	-	1	10	6	14	6	-	5	12	-	-	-
12	Stéphan Roy	Canada	P-1 Racing	49	-	10	6	12	5	-	14	-	-	-
12	Stéphan Roy	Canada	Hylton Motorsports	49											2	-
13	Charles Hall	United Kingdom	Duesenberg Brothers	26	-	-	3	8	12	3	-	-	-	-	-	-
14	Case Montgomery	United States	Condor Motorsports	20	-	-	-	-	-	1	4	1	4	8	-	2
15	Jason LaPoint	United States	Lynx Racing	19	-	-	-	-	-	-	-	-	6	-	10	3
16	Frank Dancs	United States	Condor Motorsports	17	1	3	2	-	-	-	-	-	2	5	4	-
17	Guy Cosmo	United States	World Speed Motorsports	16	4	-	-	3
17	Guy Cosmo	United States	Duesenberg Brothers	16					-	-	-	3	1	-	5	-
18	Kasey Kahne	United States	P-1 Racing	6	-	-	-	-	-	-	-	-	-	-	6	-
19	Christophe Beauvais	Canada	BBGP Racing	4	-	-	-	-	-	2	-	2	-	-	-	-
	Ross Fonferko	United States	BBGP Racing	4	-	-	-	-	1	-	-	-	3	-	-	-
	Cam Binder	Canada	Binder Racing	4	-	-	-	1	-	-	-	-	-	3	-	-
	Mike Miller	United States	World Speed Motorsports	4	-	-	-	-	3	-	-	-	-	-	-	1
23	Scott Wood	United States	Cobb Racing	3	-	-	-	-	-	-	-	-	-	-	3	-
	Matt Halliday	New Zealand	Duesenberg Brothers	2	2	-	-	-	-	-	-	-	-	-	-	-
25	Tom Wood	Canada	World Speed Motorsports	2	-	-	-	-	-	-	2	-	-	-	-	-
	Bob Siska	United States	RJS Motorsport	2	-	-	-	-	-	-	-	-	-	2	-	-

Note:

Race 2 no additional point for the qualifying were awarded due to rain, starting lineup based on combined practice times.

Race 10 Hoover Orsi had 14 points deduction (all points for his third place, but not the additional point for the pole) due to taking unjustifiable risk.

== Complete Overview ==
first column of every race	10	= grid position

second column of every race	10	= race result

R20=retired, but classified NS=did not start

Place	Name	Country	Team	(United States)		(United States)		(United States)		(Canada)		(United States)		(Canada)		(United States)		(Canada)		(United States)		(Canada)		(United States)		(United States)
1	Hoover Orsi	Brazil	Hylton Motorsports	3	2	2	2	2	1	4	R20	2	1	2	2	1	1	1	1	1	1	1	3	2	2	4	3
2	David Rutledge	Canada	PPI Motorsports	1	1	9	7	5	3	1	1	5	6	1	1	12	12	3	3	2	13	3	9	4	3	6	9
3	Joey Hand	United States	DSTP Motorsports	2	3	5	9	7	12	3	R15	3	2	3	5	8	10	7	6	5	3	2	1	3	1	1	2
4	Martín Basso	Argentina	Shank Racing	4	6	7	8	14	8	5	3	1	7	4	4	6	5	2	2	8	5	5	4	1	R15	8	5
5	Jonathan Macri	Canada	P-1 Racing	9	8	6	4	15	6	7	R11	11	9	8	9	4	6	5	5	4	2	8	R14	5	4	2	4
6	Tony Ave	United States	P-1 Racing	7	5	1	1	3	4	6	5	4	15	5	14	2	2	6	R18	7	R17	12	7	6	R14	5	7
7	Rodolfo Lavín	Mexico	Shank Racing	10	7	3	3	4	R14	8	R17	10	11	14	8	9	4	14	7	12	8	6	5	8	R12	9	6
8	Michael Valiante	Canada	Lynx Racing	6	4	-	-	-	-	2	2	-	-	7	6	-	-	4	4	-	-	4	2	-	-	-	-
	Rocky Moran Jr.	United States	Condor Motorsports	8	10	11	6	6	9	10	9	6	5
	Rocky Moran Jr.	United States	Cobb Racing											13	R19	3	7	11	R14	11	6	9	R15	-	-	3	1
10	Grant Ryley	United States	World Speed Motorsports	5	R20	8	R11	1	2	12	8	8	R17	10	3	11	8	13	9	9	R16	10	R12	16	6	10	8
11	Tim J. Bell	United States	Cobb Racing	11	R21	12	R12	10	5	11	7	9	3	6	7	7	14	9	8	6	4	11	R16	-	-	-	-
12	Stéphan Roy	Canada	P-1 Racing	15	R17	4	5	12	7	13	4	7	8	9	15	5	3	8	R16			7	R13
12	Stéphan Roy	Canada	Duesenberg Brothers																	15	15
12	Stéphan Roy	Canada	Hylton Motorsports																					9	R11	12	13
13	Charles Hall	United Kingdom	Duesenberg Brothers	-	-	-	-	11	10	9	6	12	4	11	10	14	13	-	-	-	-	-	-	-	-	-	-
14	Case Montgomery	United States	Condor Motorsports	-	-	-	-	-	-	-	-	-	-	12	12	10	9	12	12	10	9	13	6	11	R16	11	11
15	Jason LaPoint	United States	Lynx Racing	-	-	-	-	-	-	-	-	-	-	-	-	-	-	-	-	3	7	-	-	7	5	7	10
16	Frank Dancs	United States	Condor Motorsports	13	12	13	10	9	R11	16	R18	13	13	15	13	13	R15	17	13	16	11	14	8	13	9	16	R18
17	Guy Cosmo	United States	World Speed Motorsports	12	9	-	-	-	-	21	10
17	Guy Cosmo	United States	Duesenberg Brothers									-	-	-	-	-	-	15	10	13	12	-	-	12	8	-	-
18	Kasey Kahne	United States	P-1 Racing	-	-	-	-	-	-	-	-	-	-	-	-	-	-	-	-	14	R18	-	-	10	7	14	R17
19	Christophe Beauvais	Canada	BBGP Racing	-	-	-	-	-	-	17	R21	-	-	16	11	-	-	16	11	-	-	-	-	-	-	-	-
	Ross Fonferko	United States	BBGP Racing	-	-	-	-	-	-	-	-	15	12	-	-	-	-	-	-	17	10	-	-	-	-	18	15
	Cam Binder	Canada	Binder Racing	-	-	-	-	-	-	14	12	-	-	-	-	-	-	-	-	-	-	15	10	-	-	-	-
	Mike Miller	United States	World Speed Motorsports	-	-	-	-	-	-	-	-	14	10	-	-	-	-	-	-	-	-	-	-	-	-	17	12
23	Scott Wood	United States	Cobb Racing	-	-	-	-	-	-	-	-	-	-	-	-	-	-	-	-	-	-	-	-	15	10	-	-
	Matt Halliday	New Zealand	Duesenberg Brothers	16	11	-	-	-	-	-	-	-	-	-	-	-	-	-	-	-	-	-	-	-	-	-	-
25	Tom Wood	Canada	World Speed Motorsports	-	-	10	R13	8	R15	-	-	-	-	-	-	15	11	-	-	-	-	-	-	-	-	-	-
	Bob Siska	United States	RJS Motorsport	20	R19	-	-	-	-	20	14	17	16	18	17	-	-	19	R15	18	14	16	R11	14	R13	20	16
-	Sergei Szortyka	United States	J&J Racing	-	-	-	-	-	-	19	13	16	14	19	18	-	-	-	-	-	-	-	-	-	-	-	-
-	Hawk Mazzotta	United States	Margraf Racing	17	13	-	-	-	-	-	-	-	-	-	-	-	-	-	-	-	-	-	-	-	-	-	-
-	Gary Peterson	United States	Automatic Fire Sprinklers	-	-	-	-	13	R13	-	-	-	-	-	-	-	-	-	-	-	-	-	-	-	-	-	-
-	Zac Mazzotta	United States	Margraf Racing	18	14	-	-	-	-	-	-	-	-	-	-	-	-	-	-	-	-	-	-	-	-	-	-
-	Billy Ascaro	Canada	Duesenberg Brothers	-	-	-	-	-	-	-	-	-	-	-	-	-	-	-	-	-	-	-	-	-	-	15	14
-	Anthony Simone	Canada	Philips Motorsports	19	15	-	-	-	-	-	-	-	-	-	-	-	-	-	-	-	-	-	-	-	-	-	-
-	Eric Jensen	Canada	Jensen Motorsport	22	16	-	-	-	-	18	R19	-	-	17	R18	-	-	-	-	-	-	-	-	-	-	-	-
-	Cemal Yelkin	United States	Everclear Motorsports	-	-	-	-	-	-	15	16	-	-	-	-	-	-	-	-	-	-	-	-	-	-	-	-
-	Marc-Antoine Camirand	Canada	Duesenberg Brothers	-	-	-	-	-	-	-	-	-	-	-	-	-	-	10	R17	-	-	-	-	-	-	-	-
-	Steve Lorenzen	United States	BBGP Racing	21	R18	-	-	-	-	-	-	-	-	-	-	-	-	-	-	-	-	-	-	-	-	-	-
-	David Wieringa	United States	Hollander Racing	-	-	-	-	-	-	-	-	-	-	-	-	-	-	18	R19	-	-	-	-	-	-	-	-
-	Scott Jenkins	United States	Duesenberg Brothers	-	-	-	-	-	-	-	-	-	-	-	-	-	-	-	-	-	-	-	-	-	-	13	R19
-	Bakir Begovic	United States	Begovic Racing	-	-	-	-	-	-	-	-	-	-	-	-	-	-	-	-	-	-	-	-	-	-	19	R20
-	Andrew Kirkaldy	United Kingdom	BBGP Racing	14	R22	-	-	-	-	-	-	-	-	-	-	-	-	-	-	-	-	-	-	-	-	-	-
-	DeWayne Cassel	United States	Margraf Racing	-	-	-	-	-	-	-	-	-	-	-	-	-	-	-	-	-	-	-	-	-	-	21	NS

== See also ==
- 2001 CART season
- 2001 Indianapolis 500
- 2001 Indy Racing League season
- 2001 Indy Lights season
