= John Fogarty (footballer, born 1942) =

Australian rules footballer

Personal information
- Full name: John Michael Fogarty
- Born: 5 March 1942; Koroit, Victoria
- Died: 13 August 2011 (aged 69)
- Original team: Koroit
- Height: 194 cm (6 ft 4 in)
- Weight: 86 kg (190 lb)

Playing career^{1}
Years	Club	Games (Goals)
1962–63	South Melbourne	6 (0)
- ^{1} Playing statistics correct to the end of 1963.

John Michael Fogarty (5 March 1942 – 13 August 2011) was an Australian rules footballer who played with South Melbourne in the Victorian Football League (VFL).
