= Jon Fogarty =

American racing driver

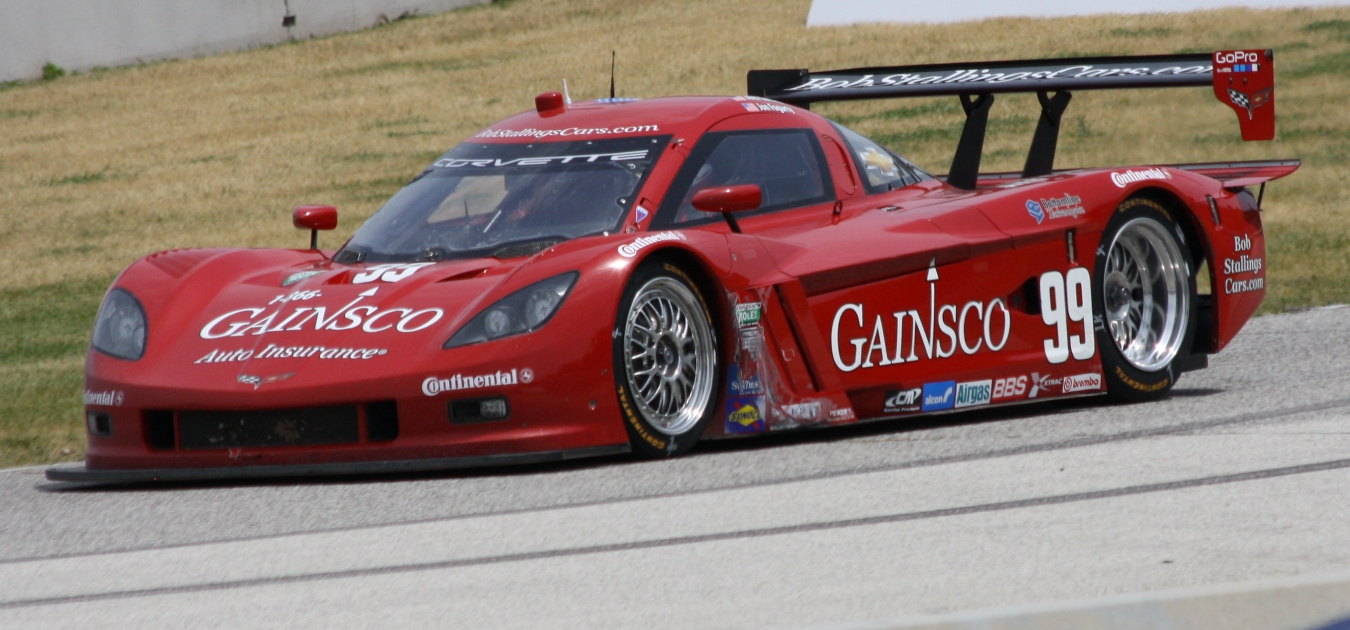
- Nationality: (United States) American
- Born: May 23, 1975 (age 51) Palo Alto, California, U.S.

United SportsCar Championship career
- Current team: GAINSCO/Bob Stallings Racing
- Categorisation: FIA Gold

Previous series
- American Le Mans Series; Toyota Atlantic; Indy Lights; Rolex Sports Car Series

Championship titles
- 2007, 2009 2002, 2004: GRAND-AM Daytona Prototype; Toyota Atlantic

Awards
- 2002 1998: Toyota Atlantic ROTY; Barber Dodge Pro Series ROTY

Jonathon David Fogarty (born May 23, 1975 in Palo Alto, California) is an American racing driver, who competes in the United SportsCar Championship for GAINSCO/Bob Stallings Racing. He won the 2007 and 2009 GRAND-AM Rolex Sports Car Series Daytona Prototype drivers' championship and is a two-time Atlantic Championship champion as well.

== Early racing career ==
Fogarty competed in the Barber Dodge Pro Series from 1996 until 2000, finishing series runner-up twice. Following a year where he was injured in Indy Lights in 2001, he moved into Toyota Atlantic in 2002 and edged Michael Valiante for the series championship. He was unsuccessful in a bid to find a Champ Car ride for 2003 with Newman Haas, he came back to earn his second Toyota Atlantic championship in 2004, with six wins to his credit.

== American Le Mans Series ==
Following an unsuccessful search for a Champ Car ride, Fogarty moved into sports car racing, driving for Flying Lizard Motorsports in the American Le Mans Series in 2005, finishing third in the GT2 drivers' championship with Johannes van Overbeek. He made only a handful of starts in 2006.

== Rolex Sports Car Series ==
Fogarty moved to the Rolex Sports Car Series in 2006, driving for GAINSCO/Bob Stallings Racing in the Daytona Prototype division. Teamed with Alex Gurney, the pairing combined for a series-record seven wins and ten poles in 2007, en route to the Daytona Prototype drivers' championship.

Fogarty and Gurney finished second in the championship standings in 2008, with one victory and eight top-five finishes. In 2009, they earned their second Daytona Prototype championship in a season that saw the No. 99 GAINSCO Riley Pontiac score four victories and six pole positions.

In 2010, Fogarty finished third in the Daytona Prototype points standings with one win, while collecting two victories en route to a fourth-place finish in the championship standings with Gurney in 2011.

Fogarty and Gurney returned to GAINSCO/Bob Stallings Racing in 2012, with its Riley-Chevrolet sporting new Corvette-themed bodywork introduced by GM.

== Racing record ==
=== SCCA National Championship Runoffs ===
Year	Track	Car	Engine	Class	Finish	Start	Status
1995	Mid-Ohio	Mysterian M2	Volkswagen	Formula Vee	4	2	Running

=== American open–wheel racing results ===
(key) (Races in bold indicate pole position) (Races in italics indicate fastest lap)

==== Indy Lights ====
Year	Team	1	2	3	4	5	6	7	8	9	10	11	12	Rank	Points
2001	Dorricott Racing	MTY; 3	LBH; 12	TXS; 9	MIL; 10	POR	KAN	TOR	MOH	STL	ATL; 5	LS; 2	FON	**11th**	**48**

==== Atlantic Championship ====
Year	Team	1	2	3	4	5	6	7	8	9	10	11	12	Rank	Points	Ref
2002	Dorricott Racing	MTY; 1	LBH; 3	MIL; 5	LS; Ret	POR; 3	**CHI**; 4	**TOR**; Ret	CLE; 2	TRR; 4	**ROA**; 2	**MTL**; 2	DEN; 1	**1st**	**161**	
2003	Team Rahal	MTY	LBH	MIL	LS	POR	CLE	TOR	TRR	MOH	MTL	DEN; 4	MIA; 4	**15th**	**24**	
2004	Pacific Coast Motorsports	LBH; Ret	MTY; 6	**MIL**; 1	**POR1**; 1	POR2; 1	CLE; 4	**TOR**; 1	VAN; 2	ROA; 2	**DEN**; 6	**MTL**; 1	**LS**; 1	**1st**	**327**	

=== Rolex Series ===
(key) (Races in bold indicate pole position)

Year	Team	1	2	3	4	5	6	7	8	9	10	11	12	13	14	Rank	Points
2006	GAINSCO/Blackhawk	R24; DNP	MEX; DNP	MIA; DNP	LBH; DNP	VIR; 14	LAG; 2	PHX; 8	WG6; 2	MOH; 3	DAY; 5	BAR; 4	WGI; 13	SON; Ret	SLC; 9	**8th**	**242**
2007	GAINSCO/Bob Stallings	R24; Ret	MEX; 1	MIA; 11	VIR; 5	**LAG**; 6	WG6; 1	**MOH**; 1	**DAY**; 1	**IOW**; 3	**BAR**; 1	**MON**; 3	**WGI**; 1	**SON**; 1	SLC; 8	**1st**	**408**
2008	GAINSCO/Bob Stallings	R24; 2	MIA; 6	MEX; 4	VIR; 14	LAG; 4	WG6; 8	MOH; 1	DAY; 2	BAR; Ret	MON; 8	WGI; 2	SON; 2	NJ; 4	SLC; 3	**2nd**	**378**
2009	GAINSCO/Bob Stallings	R24; 7	VIR; 1	NJ; 6	LAG; 1	WG6; Ret	**MOH**; 3	DAY; 2	**BAR**; 1	**WGI**; 4	**MON**; 3	**SLC**; 1	**MIA**; 4			**1st**	**337**

=== Complete FIA World Endurance Championship results ===
Year	Entrant	Class	Car	Engine	1	2	3	4	5	6	7	8	Rank	Points
2015	Extreme Speed Motorsports	LMP2	HPD ARX-03b	Honda HR28TT 2.8 L Turbo V6	SIL; 6	SPA	LMS	NÜR	COA	FUJ	SHA	BHR	6th*	8*

* Season still in progress.

=== 24 Hours of Le Mans results ===
Year	Team	Co-Drivers	Car	Class	Laps	Pos.	Class Pos.
2015	(United States) Extreme Speed Motorsports	(United States) Ed Brown (United States) Johannes van Overbeek	Ligier JS P2-Honda	LMP2	339	15th	7th

=== WeatherTech SportsCar Championship results ===
(key)(Races in bold indicate pole position, Results are overall/class)

Year	Team	Class	Make	Engine	1	2	3	4	5	6	7	8	9	10	11	Rank	Points
2014	GAINSCO/Bob Stallings Racing	P	Riley Corvette DP	Chevrolet 5.5L V8	DAY; 18											31st	55
2014	Action Express Racing	P	Coyote Corvette DP	Chevrolet 5.5L V8		SEB; 8	LBH	LAG	DET	WGL; 4	MOS	IMS	ROA	COA	PET; 10	31st	55
2015	Tequila Patrón ESM	P	HPD ARX-04b 1 HPD ARX-03b 2	Honda HR28TT 2.8 L V6 Turbo	DAY; 14	SIR; 8	LBH	LS	DET	WGL	MSP	ELK	COA	PET		22nd	42

Sporting positions
Preceded by Hoover Orsi	Toyota Atlantic Champion; 2002	Succeeded by A. J. Allmendinger
Preceded by A. J. Allmendinger	Toyota Atlantic Champion; 2004	Succeeded by Charles Zwolsman
Preceded by Jörg Bergmeister	Rolex Sports Car Series DP Champion; 2007 with Alex Gurney	Succeeded by Scott Pruett; Memo Rojas
Preceded by Scott Pruett; Memo Rojas	Rolex Sports Car Series DP Champion; 2009 with Alex Gurney	Succeeded by Scott Pruett; Memo Rojas
