= Andy Boss =

American racing driver

Andy Boss (born April 20, 1972) is an American former professional racing driver from Narragansett, Rhode Island. He is the grandson of 1950s Jaguar sportscar driver Russ Boss and younger brother of fellow racer Geoff Boss. Boss retired from active racing in 2004 and joined the A.T. Cross Company.

== Racing career ==
=== Early career ===
Like his brother, Boss began in the Skip Barber Formula Ford Series, driving a Mondial chassis powered by a 1600cc Ford motor. He finished second in the series in 1992 and came back in 1993 to dominate the series with 13 wins in 16 races. His first professional series was the Barber Saab Pro Series in 1993 which he ran concurrently with the 1993 Barber FF Series, finishing tenth (1993) and fourth (1994) in series points in his two years with the league. The 1994 championship came down to four drivers (Boss, Diego Guzman, Mark Hotchkis and Juan Pablo Montoya) at the season finale in Phoenix, with future NASCAR driver Jerry Nadeau winning the race and Columbia's Diego Guzman taking the 1994 series title. In 1994, Boss also teamed with his brother in the 12 Hours of Sebring driving Bob Leitzinger's factory backed Nissan 240SX but the car suffered from mechanical trouble while leading the GTU class. Although the car was repaired, it later retired due to engine failure. In 1995, Boss raced a select number of Barber Dodge pro Series, Vauxhall Lotus (England) and USAC FF2000 races.

=== Indy Lights ===
In 1996, Boss made his Indy Lights debut, driving in the first two races of the season but no other races. He competed in the Barber Dodge Pro Series in 1997, finishing third in the championship with six podium finishes and a victory at Mid-Ohio. He returned to Indy Lights full-time in 1998 with Conquest Racing and had a best finish of fourth at Michigan International Speedway, a race which he momentarily led but finished under caution. In 1999, Boss moved to LucasPlace Racing but still only had a best finish of fourth, this time at Homestead-Miami Speedway. He drove for LucasPlace again in 2000, but the team was severely underfunded and closed their doors at the end of the season. Along with his professional racing, Boss also competed for several years in the vintage racing series, HSR, driving a 1957 Porsche 356A Speedster.

== Complete motorsports results ==
=== Complete American open-wheel racing results ===
(key) (Races in bold indicate pole position, races in italics indicate fastest race lap)

==== USF2000 National Championship ====
| Year | Entrant | 1 | 2 | 3 | 4 | 5 | 6 | 7 | 8 | 9 | 10 | Pos | Points |
|---|---|---|---|---|---|---|---|---|---|---|---|---|---|
| 1995 | | PIR1 | PIR2 | IRP | RIR | WGI | MOH1 | NHS; 10 | ATL1 | ATL2 | MOH2 | **N.C.** | **N.C.** |

==== Indy Lights ====
| Year | Team | 1 | 2 | 3 | 4 | 5 | 6 | 7 | 8 | 9 | 10 | 11 | 12 | 13 | 14 | Rank | Points |
|---|---|---|---|---|---|---|---|---|---|---|---|---|---|---|---|---|---|
| 1996 | Performance Racing | MIA; 19 | LBH; 14 | NAZ | MIS | MIL | DET | POR | CLE | TOR | TRO | VAN | LAG | | | **33rd** | **0** |
| 1998 | Conquest Racing | MIA; 13 | LBH; 16 | NAZ; 6 | STL; 13 | MIL; 17 | DET; 14 | POR; 19 | CLE; 11 | TOR; 13 | MIS; 4 | TRO; 14 | VAN; 22 | LAG; 14 | FON; 13 | **20th** | **22** |
| 1999 | Lucas Place Motorsports | MIA; 4 | LBH; 13 | NAZ; 15 | MIL; 10 | POR; 9 | CLE; 7 | TOR; 13 | MIS; 10 | DET; 10 | CHI; 17 | LAG; 17 | FON; 12 | | | **15th** | **32** |
| 2000 | Lucas Motorsports | LBH; 13 | MIL; 14 | DET; 10 | POR; 13 | MIS; 10 | CHI; 15 | MOH; 9 | VAN; 16 | LAG; 9 | STL; 13 | HOU; 9 | FON; 12 | | | **15th** | **19** |
