= Shigeaki Hattori =

Japanese racing driver (1963–2025)

- Hattori in 2013
- Nationality: Japanese
- Born: November 3, 1963 Okayama, Okayama, Japan
- Died: April 5, 2025 (aged 61) Huntersville, North Carolina, U.S.
- Retired: 2005

Indy Racing League IndyCar Series
- Years active: 2000–2003
- Teams: Treadway-Vertex Cunningham Racing; Bradley Motorsports; A. J. Foyt Enterprises
- Starts: 26
- Wins: 0
- Poles: 0
- Best finish: 13th in 2001

Previous series
- 1999 1996–1998 1993–1994: CART World Series; Indy Lights; All-Japan Formula Three Championship

NASCAR FedEx Freight Truck Series career
- 10 races run over 1 year
- Best finish: 35th (2005)
- First race: 2005 Florida Dodge Dealers 250 (Daytona)
- Last race: 2005 Toyota Tundra 200 (Nashville)
Wins	Top tens	Poles
0	0	0

Shigeaki Hattori (服部 茂章, Hattori Shigeaki; November 3, 1963 – April 5, 2025) was a Japanese professional race car driver and team owner based in the United States. As a driver, he competed in the CART and IndyCar Series, and the NASCAR Craftsman Truck Series.

As an owner, Hattori owned Hattori Racing Enterprises, which competed full-time in the NASCAR Craftsman Truck Series. HRE also has competed part-time in the Xfinity Series, ARCA Menards Series, ARCA Menards Series East, and ARCA Menards Series West in the past. The team has fielded cars for Johnny Sauter, Alex Bowman, Austin Hill, Max McLaughlin, Brett Moffitt, Sergio Pena, Ross Kenseth, Jesse Little, and Ryan Truex. His race team won the 2018 NASCAR Camping World Truck Series championship with Brett Moffitt.

Hattori was not related to Naoki Hattori, whom he briefly raced against in CART.

== Early life ==
Hattori was born in Okayama, Japan on November 3, 1963.

== Racing career ==
Prior to moving to the United States, Hattori won the Formula Toyota championship in 1994.

=== Indy Lights ===
Hattori moved to the United States in 1995, and began competing in the Indy Lights series in 1996 at the age of 32. After finishing 13th and 25th in points in his first two seasons, he scored his first career win in the series in 1997 at the season-opener at Homestead. Later that season, he won the race at Gateway Motorsports Park and finished fourteenth in the standings.

=== CART ===
Hattori stepped up to CART in 1999, racing for Bettenhausen Motorsports. After having several accidents and spins throughout the season, his CART competition license was revoked by chief steward Wally Dallenbach Sr. He started seven races, with a best finish of 15th at Gateway International Raceway.

=== Indy Racing League ===
Hattori raced in the Indy Racing League from 2000 until 2003. His best IRL finish was a sixth at Texas Motor Speedway in 2002 and he finished 13th in IRL points in 2001 for Treadway-Vertex Cunningham Racing. He led a total of 28 laps in his 26 series starts.

=== NASCAR ===
Hattori attempted his first race in the Craftsman Truck Series at the season-finale at Homestead in 2004, with sponsorship from Aisin AW. He failed to qualify his No. 01 Toyota Tundra. Hattori was signed to drive the No. 9 Tundra for Germain Racing-Arnold Racing in 2005, with sponsorship from Aisin AW.

== Team ownership ==
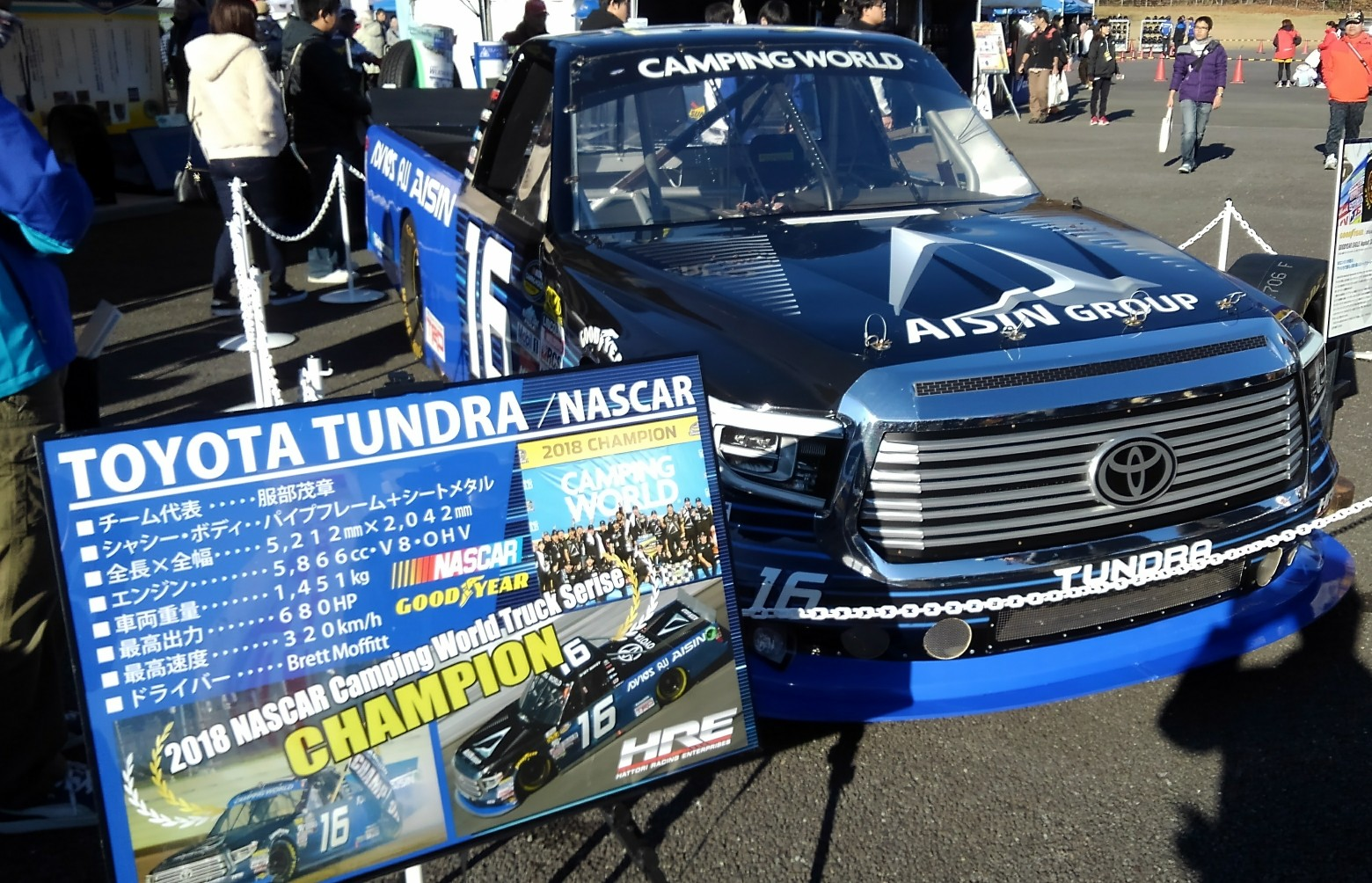
Hattori Racing Enterprises' 2018 NASCAR Camping World Truck Series championship-winning truck driven by Brett Moffitt in Japan

Beginning in 2008, Hattori fielded entries in NASCAR and ARCA competition under the Hattori Racing Enterprises banner. On August 18, 2013, he made his debut as a NASCAR Camping World Truck Series team owner, fielding the No. 16 Goodyear of Japan Toyota at Michigan International Speedway in the National Guard 200. The team finished 17th with driver Brett Moffitt. Hattori's team returned in 2014, fielding the No. 80 in several Nationwide series events. In 2015, the team fielded the No. 18 for Ross Chastain at Michigan, but he failed to qualify after the rain interrupted. Later on, the team hosted Ross Kenseth's first Truck start in the No. 18 at the fall Martinsville event.

In 2016, Ryan Truex took over Hattori's Truck ride (renumbered from the No. 18 to the No. 81 due to Kyle Busch Motorsports re-taking that number). After the team gave Truex that chance, he nearly won the season-opening race at Daytona, where he finished second. After that strong run, the team and Truex said they would try to run the full season, which ended up not happening due to sponsorship issues. However, Truex drove part-time for the team in select races for the remainder of the season. The two parties ran the full 2017 season in the renumbered No. 16, but Truex was released prior to the 2018 season.

Moffitt returned to HRE in 2018. Despite sponsorship concerns that threatened to cut their season short, Moffitt and HRE went on to win that year's championship. Nevertheless, troubles with funding resulted in Moffitt's release. Austin Hill would take over the No. 16 in 2019. The team expanded to two trucks in 2022 with Tyler Ankrum and Chase Purdy.

In 2022, Hattori formed Hattori Motorsports to compete in the GT4 America Series with Seth Lucas and Matt Plumb.

== Death ==
Hattori died on the morning of April 5, 2025 in a traffic collision on North Carolina Highway 73 near Huntersville, North Carolina. He was 61. Preliminary investigation indicates that a 2025 Toyota Crown, driven by Hattori, was traveling westbound when it crossed the centerline into the oncoming lane and collided head-on with another vehicle. Hattori was pronounced dead at the scene. The cause of the incident is under investigation.

== Racing record ==
=== American open-wheel racing results ===
(key) (Races in italics indicate fastest lap)

==== Indy Lights ====
Year	Team	1	2	3	4	5	6	7	8	9	10	11	12	13	14	Rank	Points	Ref
1996	Dorricott Racing	MIA; 9	LBH; DNS	NAZ; 10	MIS; 19	MIL; 6	DET; 13	POR; 7	CLE; 9	TOR; 4	TRO; 8	VAN; 16	LS; 14			**13th**	**42**	
1997	Lucas Place Motorsports	MIA	LBH; 9	NAZ; 20	SAV; 15	STL; 23	MIL; 16	DET; 24	POR; 23	TOR; 26	TRO; 14	VAN; 12	LS; 14	FON; 18		**25th**	**5**	
1998	Indy Regency Racing	MIA; 1	LBH; 11	NAZ; 14	STL; 1	MIL; 21	DET; 20	POR; 18	CLE; 21	TOR; 16	MIS; 20	TRO; 16	VAN; 13	LS; 9	FON; 9	**14th**	**52**	

==== CART ====
Year	Team	No.	Chassis	Engine	1	2	3	4	5	6	7	8	9	10	11	12	13	14	15	16	17	18	19	20	Rank	Points	Ref
1999	Bettenhausen Racing	16	Reynard 98i	Mercedes-Benz IC108E	MIA; DNS	MOT; 20	LBH; 26	NZR; WD	RIO	STL; 15	MIL; 23	POR; 28	CLE	ROA	TOR; 23	MIS	DET	MDO	CHI; 17	VAN	LS; WD	HOU	SRF	FON	**36th**	**0**	

==== IndyCar Series ====
Year	Team	No.	Chassis	Engine	1	2	3	4	5	6	7	8	9	10	11	12	13	14	15	16	Rank	Points	Ref
2000	Treadway Racing	55	G-Force	Oldsmobile	WDW	PHX	LVS	INDY	TXS; 8	PPI; 17	ATL; 9	KTY; 8	TX2; 7								22nd	109	
2001	Vertex-Cunningham Racing	55	Dallara	Oldsmobile	PHX; 13	HMS; 15	ATL; 8	INDY; DNQ	TXS; 10	PPI; DNS	RIR; 14	KAN; 8	NSH; 7	KTY; 7	STL; 15	CHI; 21	TX2; 16				13th	215	
2002	Bradley Motorsports	12	Dallara	Chevrolet	HMS	PHX; 25															27th	78	
2002	Bradley Motorsports	12	Dallara	Infiniti			FON; 26	NZR; 10	INDY; 20	TXS; 6	PPI; 19	RIR	KAN	NSH	MIS	KTY	STL	CHI	TX2		27th	78	
2003	A. J. Foyt Enterprises	5	G-Force	Toyota	HMS; 18		MOT; 20														26th	43	
2003	A. J. Foyt Enterprises	5	Dallara	Toyota		PHX; 10		INDY; 30	TXS	PPI	RIR	KAN	NSH	MIS	STL	KTY	NZR	CHI	FON	TX2	26th	43	

==== Indianapolis 500 ====
Year	Chassis	Engine	Start	Finish
2001	Dallara	Oldsmobile	DNQ	
2002	Dallara	Infiniti	27	20
2003	Dallara	Toyota	30	30

=== NASCAR ===
(key) (Bold – Pole position awarded by qualifying time. Italics – Pole position earned by points standings or practice time. * – Most laps led.)

==== Craftsman Truck Series ====
NASCAR Craftsman Truck Series results
Year	Team	No.	Make	1	2	3	4	5	6	7	8	9	10	11	12	13	14	15	16	17	18	19	20	21	22	23	24	25	NCTC	Pts	Ref
2004	Bill Davis Racing	01	Toyota	DAY	ATL	MAR	MFD	CLT	DOV	TEX	MEM	MLW	KAN	KEN	GTW	MCH	IRP	NSH	BRI	RCH	NHA	LVS	CAL	TEX	MAR	PHO	DAR	HOM; DNQ	NA	-	
2005	Germain/Arnold Racing	9	Toyota	DAY; 34	CAL; 30	ATL; 27	MAR; DNQ	GTY; 27	MFD; 36	CLT; 34	DOV	TEX; 35	MCH; 27	MLW; DNQ	KAN	KEN; 24	MEM	IRP	NSH; 35	BRI	RCH	NHA	LVS	MAR	ATL	TEX	PHO	HOM	35th	703	

Sporting positions
Preceded by Mitsuhiro Kinoshita	Formula Toyota Main Series; Champion; 1994	Succeeded by Takahiro Fujita
