= 1999 Marlboro Grand Prix of Miami =

(United States) 1999 Marlboro Grand Prix Miami
Race details
- Race 1 of 20 in the 1999 CART season
- Homestead-Miami Speedway
- Date: March 21, 1999
- Official name: Marlboro Grand Prix of Miami
- Location: Homestead-Miami Speedway, Homestead, Florida, United States
- Course: Permanent oval course 1.5 mi / 2.4 km
- Distance: 150 laps 225 mi / 360 km
- Weather: Dry

Pole position
- Driver: (Canada) Greg Moore (Forsythe Racing)
- Time: 24.886

Fastest lap
- Driver: (United Kingdom) Dario Franchitti (Team KOOL Green)
- Time: 26.825 (on lap 149 of 150)

Podium
- First: (Canada) Greg Moore (Forsythe Racing)
- Second: (United States) Michael Andretti (Newman-Haas Racing)
- Third: (United Kingdom) Dario Franchitti (Team KOOL Green)

The 1999 Marlboro Grand Prix of Miami was the first and opening round of the 1999 CART FedEx Champ Car World Series season, held March 21, 1999, on the Homestead-Miami Speedway in Homestead, Florida.

== Report ==
=== Report ===
The race was less than a lap old when Naoki Hattori and Al Unser Jr. crashed in turns 1 and 2, collecting Raul Boesel. Boesel was substituting for Paul Tracy, who was suspended for the race due to multiple rough-driving incidents during the 1998 season. Boesel was unhurt, but Unser and Hattori both suffered leg injuries. Richie Hearn dropped out of the race due to suspension problems. In an interview with ABC pit reporter Gary Gerould, Hearn noted he and the team had been having problems with the car all weekend, deciding to retire as to not impede other drivers.

Scott Pruett crashed in turns one and two to bring out the second yellow flag on lap 81. He was trying to pass Mauricio Gugelmin for 16th place, but lost control and spun into the wall, though he was unhurt in the crash. Several drivers took advantage of the caution to make pit stops. Helio Castro-Neves inherited the lead when they did not pit under caution. Patrick Carpentier and Robby Gordon served drive-through penalties for not using the access road to properly enter the pits during the caution. For Gordon, it was insult added to injury, since he dealt with mechanical problems during the race, already several laps down. He later retired from the race after the third caution.

The third caution came out on lap 111, when Adrian Fernandez crashed in turn four. Despite a strong start and race, Fernandez's engine blew, and he slid into the turn four wall. Castroneves pitted from the lead, ceding the lead back to Moore.

Greg Moore won the opening race of the season from pole, leading 96 out of the 150 laps, winning comfortably ahead of Michael Andretti and Dario Franchitti before a crowd of roughly 40,000. Moore capitalized on a mistake Andretti made in the pits. Andretti had won the race the previous two years, but accidentally shut off his engine during his pit stop under the 2nd caution. It would turn out to be Moore's final pole and win. Coincidentally it was also Mercedes Benz final pole and win before they left the sport altogether at the end of the 2000 season.

Shigeaki Hattori crashed during practice on Friday, the impact measured at 140 Gs. Although he was removed from the car by track personnel, he only suffered a concussion and, despite withdrawing from the race, was at the track during the race on Sunday. This was the first Champ Car race since the 1993 Indianapolis 500 without 3-time champion Bobby Rahal, who retired after the 1998 season.

== Classification ==
=== Qualifying ===
Pos	No	Driver	Team	Speed
1	99	(Canada) Greg Moore	Forsythe Racing	217.279
2	40	(Mexico) Adrián Fernández	Patrick Racing	216.861
3	33	(Canada) Patrick Carpentier	Forsythe Racing	215.701
4	9	(Brazil) Hélio Castro-Neves	Hogan Racing	215.581
5	6	(United States) Michael Andretti	Newman-Haas Racing	215.358
6	25	(Brazil) Cristiano da Matta	Arciero-Wells Racing	214.631
7	27	(United Kingdom) Dario Franchitti	Team Green	215.554
8	4	(Colombia) Juan Montoya	Chip Ganassi Racing	213.850
9	12	(United States) Jimmy Vasser	Chip Ganassi Racing	213.774
10	17	(Brazil) Mauricio Gugelmin	PacWest Racing	213.757
11	8	(United States) Bryan Herta	Team Rahal	213.757
12	15	(Japan) Naoki Hattori	Walker Racing	213.479
13	18	(United Kingdom) Mark Blundell	PacWest Racing	213.184
14	2	(United States) Al Unser Jr.	Team Penske	212.731
15	7	(Italy) Max Papis	Team Rahal	212.656
16	11	(Brazil) Christian Fittipaldi	Newman-Haas Racing	212.439
17	44	(Brazil) Tony Kanaan	Forsythe Racing	211.566
18	22	(United States) Robby Gordon	Team Gordon	211.533
19	10	(United States) Richie Hearn	Della Penna Motorsports	210.201
20	31	(Brazil) Raul Boesel	Team Green	208.877
21	20	(United States) P. J. Jones	Patrick Racing	208.531
22	24	(United States) Scott Pruett	Arciero-Wells Racing	206.484
23	36	(United States) Alex Barron	All American Racers	206.429
24	71	(Brazil) Luiz Garcia Jr.	Payton/Coyne Racing	196.020
25	5	(Brazil) Gil de Ferran	Walker Racing	No Time
26	34	(United States) Dennis Vitolo	Payton/Coyne Racing	No Time
27	19	(Mexico) Michel Jourdain Jr.	Payton/Coyne Racing	No Time
Withdrew
	16	(Japan) Shigeaki Hattori	Bettenhausen Racing	Crash during practice

=== Race ===
Pos	No	Driver	Team	Laps	Time/Retired	Grid	Points
1	99	(Canada) Greg Moore	Forsythe Racing	150	1:38:54.535	1	20+1+1
2	6	(United States) Michael Andretti	Newman-Haas Racing	150	+1.110	5	16
3	27	(United Kingdom) Dario Franchitti	Team Green	150	+2.146	7	14
4	12	(United States) Jimmy Vasser	Chip Ganassi Racing	150	+9.178	9	12
5	7	(Italy) Max Papis	Team Rahal	150	+21.411	15	10
6	5	(Brazil) Gil de Ferran	Walker Racing	150	+21.700	24	8
7	33	(Canada) Patrick Carpentier	Forsythe Racing	150	+21.922	3	6
8	18	(United Kingdom) Mark Blundell	PacWest Racing	150	+24.862	13	5
9	11	(Brazil) Christian Fittipaldi	Newman-Haas Racing	150	+25.467	16	4
10	4	(Colombia) Juan Pablo Montoya	Chip Ganassi Racing	149	+1 Lap	8	3
11	17	(Brazil) Maurício Gugelmin	PacWest Racing	149	+1 Lap	10	2
12	8	(United States) Bryan Herta	Team Rahal	149	+1 Lap	11	1
13	20	(United States) P. J. Jones	Patrick Racing	149	+1 Lap	19	
14	25	(Brazil) Cristiano da Matta	Arciero-Wells Racing	148	+2 Laps	6	
15	36	(United States) Alex Barron	All American Racers	148	+2 Laps	23	
16	34	(United States) Dennis Vitolo	Payton/Coyne Racing	142	+8 Laps	26	
17	9	(Brazil) Hélio Castroneves	Hogan Racing	138	Electrical	4	
18	19	(Mexico) Michel Jourdain Jr.	Payton/Coyne Racing	136	+14 Laps	27	
19	22	(United States) Robby Gordon	Team Gordon	112	Engine	18	
20	40	(Mexico) Adrián Fernández	Patrick Racing	110	Contact	2	
21	44	(Brazil) Tony Kanaan	Forsythe Racing	98	Fuel system	17	
22	24	(United States) Scott Pruett	Arciero-Wells Racing	79	Contact	22	
23	10	(United States) Richie Hearn	Della Penna Motorsports	36	Suspension	19	
24	71	(Brazil) Luiz Garcia Jr.	Payton/Coyne Racing	1	Contact	25	
25	15	(Japan) Naoki Hattori	Walker Racing	0	Contact	12	
26	2	(United States) Al Unser Jr.	Team Penske	0	Contact	14	
27	26	(Brazil) Raul Boesel	Team Green	0	Contact	20	
DNS	16	(Japan) Shigeaki Hattori	Bettenhausen Racing		Injury		

== Caution flags ==
Laps	Cause
2-17	Hattori (15), Unser Jr. (2), Hearn (10), Boesel (26), Garcia Jr. (71) contact
82-92	Pruett (24) contact
111-121	Fernández (40) contact

== Lap Leaders ==
Laps	Leader
1-59	Greg Moore
60	Patrick Carpentier
61-62	Adrián Fernández
63-64	Michael Andretti
65-66	Gil de Ferran
67-84	Dario Franchitti
85-113	Hélio Castroneves
114-150	Greg Moore

Driver	Laps led
Greg Moore	96
Hélio Castroneves	29
Dario Franchitti	18
Michael Andretti	2
Gil de Ferran	2
Adrián Fernández	2
Patrick Carpentier	1

== Point standings after race ==
Pos	Driver	Points
1	(Canada) Greg Moore	22
2	(United States) Michael Andretti	16
3	(United Kingdom) Dario Franchitti	14
4	(United States) Jimmy Vasser	12
5	(Italy) Max Papis	10
