= Marlboro 500 =

There have been two IndyCar/Champ Car races named Marlboro 500:

- Marlboro 500 (Michigan), run at Michigan International Speedway from 1987 to 1996
- Marlboro 500 (California), run at California Speedway in 1997 and from 1999 to 2001
