= 1992 Barber Saab Pro Series =

1992 Barber Saab Pro Series season

Seasons
- ← 1991 1993 →

The 1992 Barber Saab Pro Series season was the seventh season of the series. Zerex continued to support the racing series. All drivers used Saab powered Goodyear shod Mondiale chassis. Swede Robert Amren won the championship.

== Race calendar and results ==
Round	Circuit	Location	Date	Winner
1	Bicentennial Park	(United States) Miami, Florida	February 23	(Sweden) Robert Amren
2	Sebring International Raceway	(United States) Sebring, Florida	March 21	(Sweden) Robert Amren
3	Road Atlanta	(United States) Braselton, Georgia	April 26	(Finland) Tony Leivo
4	Lime Rock Park	(United States) Lime Rock, Connecticut	May 24	(United States) Ashton Lewis
5	New Orleans street circuit	(United States) New Orleans, Louisiana	June 14	(United States) Page Jones
6	New Hampshire Motor Speedway	(United States) Loudon, New Hampshire	July 5	(United States) Page Jones
7	Mazda Raceway Laguna Seca	(United States) Monterey County, California	July 19	(Sweden) Robert Amren
8	Road America	(United States) Elkhart Lake, Wisconsin	August 9	(Sweden) Robert Amren
9	Road America	(United States) Elkhart Lake, Wisconsin	August 23	(Sweden) Robert Amren
10	Mid-Ohio Sports Car Course	(United States) Lexington, Ohio	September 23	(Sweden) Robert Amren
11	Phoenix International Raceway	(United States) Phoenix, Arizona	October 4	(United States) Ashton Lewis
12	Del Mar Fairgrounds	(United States) Del Mar, California	October 11	(United States) Page Jones

== Final standings ==
Color	Result
Gold	Winner
Silver	2nd place
Bronze	3rd place
Green	4th & 5th place
Light Blue	6th–10th place
Dark Blue	11th place or lower
Purple	Did not finish
Red	Did not qualify (DNQ)
Brown	Withdrawn (Wth)
Black	Disqualified (DSQ)
White	Did not start (DNS)
Blank	Did not participate (DNP)
Blank	Driver replacement (Rpl)
Blank	Injured (Inj)
Blank	No race held (NH)

Rank	Driver	(United States) BIC	(United States) SEB	(United States) ATL	(United States) LRP	(United States) NOR	(United States) NHS	(United States) LAG	(United States) ROA1	(United States) ROA2	(United States) MOH	(United States) PIR	(United States) DMS	Points
1	(Sweden) Robert Amren	1	1	2				1	1	1	1		2	184
2	(United States) Ashton Lewis				1							1	6	130
3	(United States) Page Jones					1	1	3					1	92
4	(United States) Alex Padilla			3				2						90
5	(Italy) Riccardo Dona			5				5					7	60
6	(United States) Rick Pollock							4					5	60
7	(Colombia) Diego Guzman			4										50
8	(United States) Leo Parente													39
9	(United States) Bill Adams												4	38
10	(United States) Craig Hall							8					8	33
	(United States) Royce de Rohan Barondes							11						
	(United States) John Bigham							7						
	(United States) Michael Fox							10						
	(United States) Saeed Gazzar							12						
	(United States) Stephen Hynes							15						
	(United States) Sean Jones												9	
	(United States) Nick Kunewalder												10	
	(Finland) Tony Leivo			1										
	(United States) David Pook												3	
	(United States) Paul Silicato							13						
	(Mexico) Jesus Silva							9						
	(United States) Brandon Sperling							6						
	(United States) Blair Walker							14						
