= Mark Hotchkis =

American racing driver

- Born: April 17, 1969 (age 57) Pasadena, California, U.S.

Previous series
- 1995-1998 1994 1993: Indy Lights; Barber Saab Pro Series; Skip Barber Formula Dodge

Mark Hotchkis (born April 17, 1969) is an American former racing driver from Pasadena, California.

== Racing career ==
After graduating from the Bob Bondurant School of High Performance Driving and the Elf-Winfield School first in class, Hotchkis started competitive racing in karting in 1993. Hotchkis made his auto racing debut in 1993. In the regional Formula Dodge championships. Hotchkis won the Rookie of the Year title in the Western and Midwestern championships. He captured another five wins in the Eastern championship.

For 1994, Hotchkis graduated into the Barber Saab Pro Series. In his first race at Bicentennial Park in Miami, Hotchkiss finished eleventh. Near the end of the season with three rounds to go, Hotchkis was placed third in the championship. As Hotchkis won both races at Road America and placed second in the season finale at Phoenix International Raceway, he beat Juan Pablo Montoya for the second place in the standings. The following year, Hotchkis moved into Indy Lights, finishing seventh in points. He captured his first win the following year from the pole at the Milwaukee Mile and finished a career best fifth in points. He drove for Team Green in 1997 but failed to win and again finished seventh in points. He competed part-time in 1998 and won his final Indy Lights race, the season finale at California Speedway.

== Personal life ==
Hotchkis is an alumnus of Chapman University where he studied legal studies. Hotchkis is now involved with his brother John's company, Hotchkis Sport Suspension, which designs and markets high performance suspension systems for classic muscle cars. Mark and John also own a classic Porsche 962 race car that they campaign in various vintage races.

Hotchkis is married with two children.

== Racing record ==
=== American open-wheel racing results ===
(key) (Races in bold indicate pole position) (Races in italics indicate fastest lap)

==== Indy Lights ====
Year	Team	1	2	3	4	5	6	7	8	9	10	11	12	13	14	Rank	Points
1995	Leading Edge Motorsport	MIA; Ret	PHX; 7	LBH; Ret	NAZ; Ret	MIL; 5	DET; 10	POR; 9	TOR; 6	CLE; 4	NHA; 5	VAN; 13	LS; 9			**7th**	**57**
1996	Genoa Racing	MIA; 3	LBH; 9	NAZ; 3	MIS; 2	**MIL**; 1	DET; 9	POR; 10	**CLE**; Ret	TOR; 9	TRO; Ret	VAN; 3	LS; 7			**5th**	**101**
1997	Team Green	MIA; 4	LBH; 3	NAZ; Ret	SAV; 17	STL; Ret	MIL; 7	DET; 6	POR; 16	TOR; 17	**TRO**; 2	VAN; 11	LS; 4	FON; 11		**7th**	**74**
1998	Mattco Raceworks	MIA	LBH	NAZ; 9	STL; 21	MIL; 7	DET; 4	POR	CLE	TOR	MIS	TRO; 7	VAN; 11	LS	FON; 1	**15th**	**50**

=== SCCA National Championship Runoffs ===
Year	Track	Car	Engine	Class	Finish	Start	Status
2005	Mid-Ohio	Porsche 914/4		F Production	1	4	Running
