= 1994 Barber Saab Pro Series =

1994 Barber Saab Pro Series season

Seasons
- ← 1993 1995 →

The 1994 Barber Saab Pro Series season was the tenth season of the series. All drivers used Saab powered Goodyear shod Mondiale chassis. 1994 was the final season the Saab H engine was used. Diego Guzman won the championship.

== Race calendar and results ==
Round	Circuit	Location	Date	Winner
1	Bicentennial Park	(United States) Miami, Florida	February 27	(Colombia) Juan Pablo Montoya
2	Sebring International Raceway	(United States) Sebring, Florida	March 19	(Netherlands) Hans de Graaff
3	Road Atlanta	(United States) Braselton, Georgia	April 17	(United States) Luis Zervigon
4	Lime Rock Park	(United States) Lime Rock, Connecticut	May 30	(Colombia) Diego Guzman
5	Detroit Belle Isle Grand Prix	(United States) Detroit, Michigan	June 12	(Colombia) Diego Guzman
6	Watkins Glen International	(United States) Watkins Glen, New York	June 25	(Colombia) Diego Guzman
7	Mazda Raceway Laguna Seca	(United States) Monterey County, California	July 24	(United States) Mark Hotchkis
8	Mid-Ohio Sports Car Course	(United States) Lexington, Ohio	August 13	(Colombia) Juan Pablo Montoya
9	New Hampshire Motor Speedway	(United States) Loudon, New Hampshire	August 21	(United States) Jerry Nadeau
10	Road America	(United States) Elkhart Lake, Wisconsin	September 10	(United States) Mark Hotchkis
11	Road America	(United States) Elkhart Lake, Wisconsin	September 11	(United States) Mark Hotchkis
12	Phoenix International Raceway	(United States) Phoenix, Arizona	October 3	(United States) Jerry Nadeau

== Final standings ==
Color	Result
Gold	Winner
Silver	2nd place
Bronze	3rd place
Green	4th & 5th place
Light Blue	6th–10th place
Dark Blue	11th place or lower
Purple	Did not finish
Red	Did not qualify (DNQ)
Brown	Withdrawn (Wth)
Black	Disqualified (DSQ)
White	Did not start (DNS)
Blank	Did not participate (DNP)
Blank	Driver replacement (Rpl)
Blank	Injured (Inj)
Blank	No race held (NH)

Rank	Driver	(United States) BIC	(United States) SEB	(United States) ATL	(United States) LRP	(United States) DET	(United States) WGI	(United States) LAG	(United States) MOH	(United States) NHS	(United States) ROA1	(United States) ROA2	(United States) PIR	Points
1	(Colombia) Diego Guzman	21	7		1	1	1	6					3	128
2	(United States) Mark Hotchkis	11		2			3	1			1	1	2	122
3	(Colombia) Juan Pablo Montoya	1	2	7			6	4	1				5	114
4	(United States) Andy Boss	2	6	3			12	3					20	101
5	(United States) Jerry Nadeau	27	3				7	17		1			1	89
6	(United States) Luis Zervigon	4	4	1			4	23					19	77
7	(United States) Geoff Boss	9		9			17	5					4	72
8	(South Africa) Jaki Scheckter	13	5	6			18	20					6	62
9	(United States) Barry Waddell	6		10			8	2						48
10	(Italy) Riccardo Dona	3		4			2	15						46
11	(United States) Dave Ahlheim												12	
12	(United States) Mark Baker						9						17	
13	(United States) Zak Brown	10												
14	(South Africa) Richard Brunt							9					10	
15	(Italy) Matteo Calestani	8	9											
16	(United States) Juan Capistrano													
17	(United States) Gary Capparelli						21							
18	(Chile) J.C. Carbonell							7						
19	(Brazil) Julius Carniero													
20	(United States) Alan Cianciarulo	14												
21	(United States) Tom Cormack	15												
22	(United States) Richard Dale													
23	(Netherlands) Hans de Graaff	23	1				20							
24	(United States) Don Evans							13					18	
25	(United Kingdom) Paul Evans												8	
26	(United States) Jon Field	25						21						
27	(United States) Brad Funk	20	8	5			5							
28	(United Kingdom) Divina Galica												11	
29	(United States) Mickey Gilbert													
30	(Colombia) Jaime Guerrero							22						
31	(Mexico) Claudio Hall van Beuren	28												
32	(Chile) Claudio Israel							14						
33	(United States) Jeffrey Jones	18					16	18						
34	(Sweden) Niclas Jönsson	26												
35	(Argentina) Leandro Larrosa												16	
36	(United States) Mike Lee						19							
37	(United States) Peter MacLeod													
38	(Northern Ireland) Andrew McAuley	5		8										
39	(United States) Jeff Morton							19						
40	(United States) Augie Pabst III													
41	(United States) Will Pace						10	8					9	
42	(United States) Steve Paskan													
43	(United States) Steve Pelke													
44	(United States) Rick Pollock												7	
45	(United States) Harry Puterbaugh	16												
46	(United States) Steve Rikert						14							
47	(United States) Stephen Sardelli						15	12					15	
48	(United Kingdom) Mark Shaw	12					13	10						
49	(United States) Wes Short	7												
50	(Netherlands) Michael Vergers	22												
51	(United States) Jeff Ward	17	10											
52	(United States) Simon White	19												
53	(United States) Jeff Willoughby	24					11	11						
