= 1996 Indy Lights season =

- PPG/Firestone Indy Lights Championship

Season
- Races: 12
- Start date: March 3
- End date: September 8

Awards
- Drivers' champion: (Canada) David Empringham

The 1996 PPG/Firestone Indy Lights Championship Powered By Buick consisted of 12 races. Canadian David Empringham captured three wins on his way to the championship.

This was the last season where all teams used the Lola T93/20-Buick spec car, which was replaced in the 1997 season by the Lola T97/20-Buick spec car.

The scoring system was 20-16-14-12-10-8-6-5-4-3-2-1 points awarded to the first 12 (twelve) finishers, with 1 (one) extra point given to the driver who took pole-position, and another extra point given to the driver who led most laps in the race.

== Team and driver chart ==
The following drivers and teams competed in the series:

Team	No.	Drivers	Round(s)
Brian Stewart Racing	2	(Sweden) Mattias Andersson	1–2
Brian Stewart Racing	2	(United States) Nick Firestone	4–9
Brian Stewart Racing	2	(Brazil) Felipe Giaffone	11–12
Brian Stewart Racing	3	(Brazil) Gualter Salles	All
Brian Stewart Racing	61	(United States) Jack Miller	All
Dorricott Racing	31	(Japan) Shigeaki Hattori	All
Dorricott Racing	32	(United States) Jeff Ward	All
FRE Racing	17	(Brazil) José Cordova	1–2
FRE Racing	17	(United States) Peter Faucetta Jr.	3
FRE Racing	17	(South Africa) Jaki Scheckter	5–7, 12
FRE Racing	17	(United States) Robbie Buhl	9
Forsythe Racing	33	(Canada) David Empringham	All
Forsythe Racing	66	(Canada) Claude Bourbonnais	All
Forsythe Racing	99	(Canada) Bertrand Godin	9–12
Genoa Racing	24	(United States) David DeSilva	All
Indy Regency Racing	28	(Japan) Hideki Noda	All
Leading Edge Motorsports	4	(Brazil) Felipe Giaffone	1–8
Leading Edge Motorsports	4	(Brazil) José Giaffone	10–12
Leading Edge Motorsports	4	(Canada) Sohrab Amirsardari	9
Leading Edge Motorsports	5	(Canada) Sohrab Amirsardari	6
Leading Edge Motorsports	23	(United States) Mark Hotchkis	All
Leading Edge Motorsports	77	(Mexico) Rodolfo Lavín	1–2, 4–12
PacWest Lights	10	(United States) Bob Reid	9
PacWest Lights	10	(United States) Robby Unser	1–2
PacWest Lights	12	(United States) Robby Unser	3–7, 9–12
PacWest Lights	12	(United States) Casey Mears	8
Performance Racing	9	(United States) Andy Boss	1–2
Performance Racing	9	(United States) David LaCroix	11
RaceCars	88	(Colombia) Diego Gumzán	1
RaceCars	88	(Brazil) Paulo Carcasci	2
RaceCars	88	(Mexico) Freddy van Beuren	8–12
RaceCars	89	(Paraguay) Danny Candía	1
RaceCars	89	(Paraguay) Roque Aranda	2–4
RaceCars	89	(Brazil) Maurício Slaviero	7–9
Summit Motorsports	20	(United States) Doug Boyer	1–2, 4–6
Tasman Motorsports	37	(Brazil) Tony Kanaan	All
Tasman Motorsports	38	(Argentina) José Luís Di Palma	All
Tasman Motorsports	39	(Brazil) Hélio Castroneves	All
Team Green	26	(United States) Chris Simmons	All
Team Green	27	(United States) Greg Ray	All
Team Leisy / McCormack	34	(United States) Harry Puterbaugh Jr.	1, 3
Team Leisy / McCormack	34	(United States) Shan Groff	2, 12
Team Leisy / McCormack	35	(Sweden) Niclas Jönsson	2
Team Medlin	12	(United States) Alex Padilla	1–3, 5–12

== Schedule ==
Rd.	Date	Track	Location
1	March 3	O Homestead-Miami Speedway	Homestead, Florida
2	April 14	R Long Beach Street Circuit	Long Beach, California
3	April 28	O Nazareth Speedway	Nazareth, Pennsylvania
4	May 25	O Michigan International Speedway	Brooklyn, Michigan
5	June 2	O Milwaukee Mile	West Allis, Wisconsin
6	June 9	R The Raceway at Belle Isle Park	Detroit, Michigan
7	June 23	R Portland International Raceway	Portland, Oregon
8	June 30	R Cleveland Burke Lakefront Airport	Cleveland, Ohio
9	July 14	R Exhibition Place	Toronto, Ontario
10	August 4	R Circuit Trois-Rivières	Trois-Rivières, Quebec
11	September 1	R Streets of Vancouver	Vancouver, British Columbia
12	September 8	R Laguna Seca Raceway	Monterey, California

== Race results ==
Round	Circuit	Pole position	Most laps led	Race Winner	
Round	Circuit	Pole position	Most laps led	Driver	Team
1	(United States) Homestead-Miami Speedway	(Canada) David Empringham	(Canada) David Empringham	(Canada) David Empringham	Forsythe Racing
2	(United States) Long Beach Street Circuit	(Brazil) Gualter Salles	(Canada) David Empringham	(Canada) David Empringham	Forsythe Racing
3	(United States) Nazareth Speedway	(Canada) Claude Bourbonnais	(United States) David DeSilva	(United States) David DeSilva	Genoa Racing
4	(United States) Michigan International Speedway	(Canada) David Empringham	(Canada) David Empringham	(Canada) David Empringham	Forsythe Racing
5	(United States) Milwaukee Mile	(United States) Mark Hotchkis	(United States) Mark Hotchkis	(United States) Mark Hotchkis	Leading Edge Motorsports
6	(United States) The Raceway at Belle Isle Park	(Canada) David Empringham	(Brazil) Tony Kanaan	(Brazil) Tony Kanaan	Tasman Motorsports
7	(United States) Portland International Raceway	(Brazil) Tony Kanaan	(Brazil) Gualter Salles	(Brazil) Gualter Salles	Brian Stewart Racing
8	(United States) Cleveland Burke Lakefront Airport	(United States) Mark Hotchkis	(Brazil) Gualter Salles	(Brazil) Gualter Salles	Brian Stewart Racing
9	(Canada) Exhibition Place	(United States) Jeff Ward	(Brazil) Gualter Salles	(Brazil) Gualter Salles	Brian Stewart Racing
10	(Canada) Circuit Trois-Rivières	(Brazil) Hélio Castroneves	(Brazil) Hélio Castroneves	(Brazil) Hélio Castroneves	Tasman Motorsports
11	(Canada) Streets of Vancouver	(United States) Jeff Ward	(Brazil) Tony Kanaan	(Canada) Claude Bourbonnais	Forsythe Racing
12	(United States) Laguna Seca Raceway	(Brazil) Tony Kanaan	(Brazil) Tony Kanaan	(Brazil) Tony Kanaan	Tasman Motorsports

== Race summaries ==
=== Homestead race ===
Held March 3 at Homestead-Miami Speedway. David Empringham won the pole.

Top Five Results

1. David Empringham
2. Chris Simmons
3. Mark Hotchkis
4. David DeSilva
5. Jeff Ward

=== Long Beach race ===
Held April 14 at Long Beach, California Street Course. Gualter Salles won the pole.

Top Five Results

1. David Empringham
2. Tony Kanaan
3. Gualter Salles
4. Hélio Castro-Neves
5. Alex Padilla

=== Nazareth race ===
Held April 28 at Nazareth Speedway. Claude Bourbonnais won the pole.

Top Five Results

1. David DeSilva
2. David Empringham
3. Mark Hotchkis
4. Chris Simmons
5. Jeff Ward

=== Michigan race ===
Held May 25 at Michigan International Speedway. David Empringham won the pole. This was the Indy Lights series' first race on a high-banked speedway.

Top Five Results

1. David Empringham
2. Mark Hotchkis
3. Jeff Ward
4. Robby Unser
5. Hélio Castro-Neves

=== Milwaukee race ===
Held June 2 at The Milwaukee Mile. Mark Hotchkis won the pole.

Top Five Results

1. Mark Hotchkis
2. Greg Ray
3. David Empringham
4. Gualter Salles
5. Chris Simmons

=== Detroit race ===
Held June 9 at Belle Isle Raceway. David Empringham won the pole.

Top Five Results

1. Tony Kanaan
2. Alex Padilla
3. Claude Bourbonnais
4. José Luis Di Palma
5. Jaki Scheckter

=== Portland race ===
Held June 23 at Portland International Raceway. Tony Kanaan won the pole.

Top Five Results

1. Gualter Salles
2. Alex Padilla
3. David Empringham
4. Claude Bourbonnais
5. Tony Kanaan

=== Cleveland race ===
Held June 30 at Burke Lakefront Airport. Mark Hotchkis won the pole.

Top Five Results

1. Gualter Salles
2. Claude Bourbonnais
3. Hélio Castro-Neves
4. Nick Firestone
5. Hideki Noda

=== Toronto race ===
Held July 14 at Exhibition Place. Jeff Ward won the pole.

Top Five Results

1. Gualter Salles
2. Claude Bourbonnais
3. Hideki Noda
4. Shigeaki Hattori
5. Alex Padilla

=== Trois-Rivières race ===
Held August 4 at the Trois-Rivières, Quebec Street Circuit. Hélio Castro-Neves won the pole.

Top Five Results

1. Hélio Castro-Neves
2. Tony Kanaan
3. Alex Padilla
4. David Empringham
5. Bertrand Godin

=== Vancouver race ===
Held September 1 at Pacific Place. Jeff Ward won the pole.

Top Five Results

1. Claude Bourbonnais
2. Tony Kanaan
3. Jeff Hotchkis
4. Alex Padilla
5. David Empringham

=== Laguna Seca race ===
Held September 8 at Mazda Raceway Laguna Seca. Tony Kanaan won the pole.

Top Five Results

1. Tony Kanaan
2. Hélio Castro-Neves
3. Claude Bourbonnais
4. Alex Padilla
5. Jeff Ward

== Championship standings ==
=== Drivers' championship ===
Scoring system

Position	**1st**	**2nd**	**3rd**	**4th**	**5th**	**6th**	**7th**	**8th**	**9th**	**10th**	**11th**	**12th**
Points	20	16	14	12	10	8	6	5	4	3	2	1

- The driver who qualifies on pole is awarded one additional point.
- An additional point is awarded to the driver who leads the most laps in a race.

Pos	Driver	HMS (United States)	LBH (United States)	NAZ (United States)	MIS (United States)	MIL (United States)	DET (United States)	POR (United States)	CLE (United States)	TOR (Canada)	TRO (Canada)	VAN (Canada)	LAG (United States)	Points
1	(Canada) David Empringham	**1***	1*	2	**1***	3	**21**	3	21	6	4	5	6	148
2	(Brazil) Tony Kanaan	10	2	12	17	7	1*	**5**	19	24	2	2*	**1***	113
3	(Brazil) Gualter Salles	6	**3**	11	6	4	22	1*	1*	1*	15	21	19	108
4	(Canada) Claude Bourbonnais	Wth	7	**16**	18	8	3	4	2	2	20	1	3	104
5	(United States) Mark Hotchkis	3	9	3	2	**1***	9	10	**18**	9	19	3	7	102
6	(United States) Alex Padilla	17	5	15		17	2	2	20	5	3	4	4	90
7	(Brazil) Hélio Castroneves	DNS	4	17	5	11	17	8	3	23	**1***	10	2	84
8	(United States) David DeSilva	4	10	1*	7	19	6	12	16	15	7	18	9	61
9	(Argentina) José Luís Di Palma	15	6	6	8	14	4	11	7	8	11	6	13	56
10	(United States) Chris Simmons	2	23	4	12	5	7	21	11	14	17	7	12	54
11	(United States) Jeff Ward	5	8	5	3	DNS	11	17	13	**20**	16	**20**	5	53
12	(United States) Greg Ray	7	11	18	15	2	8	6	10	16	6	17	16	48
13	(Japan) Shigeaki Hattori	9	DNS	10	19	6	13	7	9	4	8	16	14	42
14	(Japan) Hideki Noda	11	16	7	13	12	16	20	5	3	12	13	15	34
15	(United States) Robby Unser	13	15	14	4	10	10	15		10	9	14	20	25
16	(Canada) Bertrand Godin									7	5	11	10	21
17	(Brazil) Felipe Giaffone	14	24	13	10	9	18	16	6			22	8	20
18	(United States) Nick Firestone				11	16	20	9	4	19				18
19	(South Africa) Jaki Scheckter						5	18					11	12
20	(United States) Jack Miller	21	18	6	20	18	15	19	14	21	10	9	23	12
21	(Paraguay) Roque Aranda		20	9	9									8
22	(Mexico) Freddy van Beuren								12	12	13	8	17	7
23	(United States) Doug Boyer	8	22		16	13	19							5
24	(United States) Casey Mears								8					5
25	(United States) Robbie Buhl									11				2
26	(Mexico) Rodolfo Lavín	16	19		14	15	12	14	15	13	18	12	21	2
27	(United States) Shan Groff		12										22	1
28	(Brazil) José Cordova	12	25											1
29	(Brazil) Mauricio Slaviero							13	17	18				0
30	(Sweden) Mattias Andersson	20	13											0
31	(Canada) Sohrab Amirsardari						14			17				0
32	(Brazil) José Giaffone										14	19	18	0
33	(United States) Andy Boss	19	14											0
34	(United States) David LaCroix											15		0
35	(Sweden) Niclas Jönsson		17											0
36	(Colombia) Diego Guzmán	18												0
37	(United States) Peter Faucetta Jr.			19										0
38	(Brazil) Paulo Carcasci		21											0
39	(Paraguay) Danny Candía	22												0
40	(United States) Bob Reid									22				0
41	(United States) Harry Puterbaugh Jr.	23		DNS										0
Pos	Driver	HMS (United States)	LBH (United States)	NAZ (United States)	MIS (United States)	MIL (United States)	DET (United States)	POR (United States)	CLE (United States)	TOR (Canada)	TRO (Canada)	VAN (Canada)	LAG (United States)	Points

Color	Result
Gold	Winner
Silver	2nd place
Bronze	3rd place
Green	4th & 5th place
Light Blue	6th–10th place
Dark Blue	Finished (Outside Top 10)
Purple	Did not finish
Red	Did not qualify (DNQ)
Brown	Withdrawn (Wth)
Black	Disqualified (DSQ)
White	Did not start (DNS)
Blank	Did not participate (DNP)
Blank	Not competing

**In-line notation**
**Bold**	Pole position(1 point)
Italics	Ran fastest race lap
*	Led most race laps (2 points)
^{1}	Qualifying cancelled no bonus point awarded

- Ties in points broken by number of wins, or best finishes.
