= Cristiano da Matta =

Brazilian racing driver (born 1973)

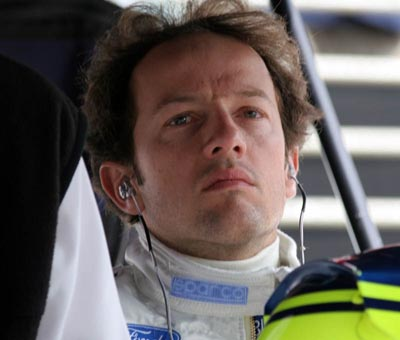
- Da Matta at the 2006 Grand Prix of Long Beach
- Nationality: (Brazil) Brazilian
- Born: Cristiano Monteiro da Matta; 19 September 1973 (age 53); Belo Horizonte, Minas Gerais, Brazil
- Achievements: 2002 CART FedEx Championship Series Champion

Champ Car career
- 101 races run over 6 years
- Years active: 1999–2002, 2005–2006
- Team(s): Arciero-Wells; PPI Motorsports; Newman-Haas; PKV Racing; Dale Coyne Racing; RuSPORT
- Best finish: 1st - 2002
- First race: 1999 Marlboro Grand Prix of Miami (Homestead)
- Last race: 2006 Grand Prix of San Jose (Streets of San Jose)
- First win: 2000 Target Grand Prix of Chicago (Cicero, IL)
- Last win: 2005 Grand Prix of Portland (Portland Raceway)
Wins	Podiums	Poles
12	20	7

Formula One World Championship career
- Active years: 2003–2004
- Team: Toyota
- Entries: 28
- Championships: 0
- Wins: 0
- Podiums: 0
- Career points: 13
- Pole positions: 0
- Fastest laps: 0
- First entry: 2003 Australian Grand Prix
- Last entry: 2004 German Grand Prix

Cristiano Monteiro da Matta (born 19 September 1973) is a Brazilian former professional racing driver. He won the CART Championship in 2002, and drove in Formula One with the Toyota team from 2003 to 2004.

== Biography ==
=== Origins and early career ===
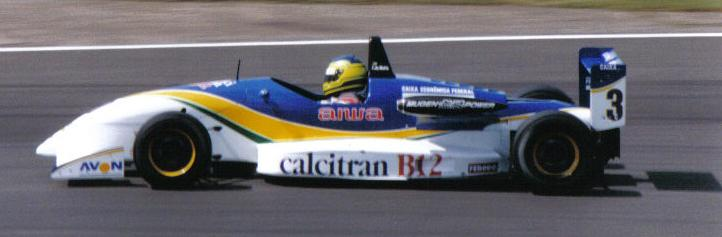
Da Matta driving for West Surrey Racing at Silverstone during the 1995 British Formula 3 Championship season.

Da Matta's father was Toninho da Matta, a fourteen-time Brazilian touring car champion. Born in Belo Horizonte, Cristiano da Matta began karting at the age of sixteen, adopting a helmet design nearly identical to his famous father's helmet. He quickly rose to the top by winning numerous karting championships before winning the 1993 Brazilian Formula Ford championship. In 1994, he continued his successful ways, winning the Brazilian Formula 3 championship against the likes of Hélio Castroneves and Ricardo Zonta. In 1995, da Matta participated in the British Formula 3 series, winning one race and placing eighth in the standings. He then placed eighth in the following year's Formula 3000 championship, with a best finish of fourth at Pau.

=== North American racing ===
1997 saw da Matta move to the United States for the Indy Lights racing series, in which he won Rookie of the Year honors. The next year (1998), he won the championship by winning seven races and securing four pole positions. In 1999, da Matta raced in the CART series for Team Arciero Wells, which were running Toyota engines; da Matta drove a Toyota-powered car from then until 2004. His first win came in 2000, and despite some sponsor opposition he joined the front-running Newman/Haas Racing team for 2001. He won the CART drivers' championship in 2002 under Toyota power with the Newman/Haas Racing team, dominating the year with seven race wins and seven poles.

=== Formula One ===
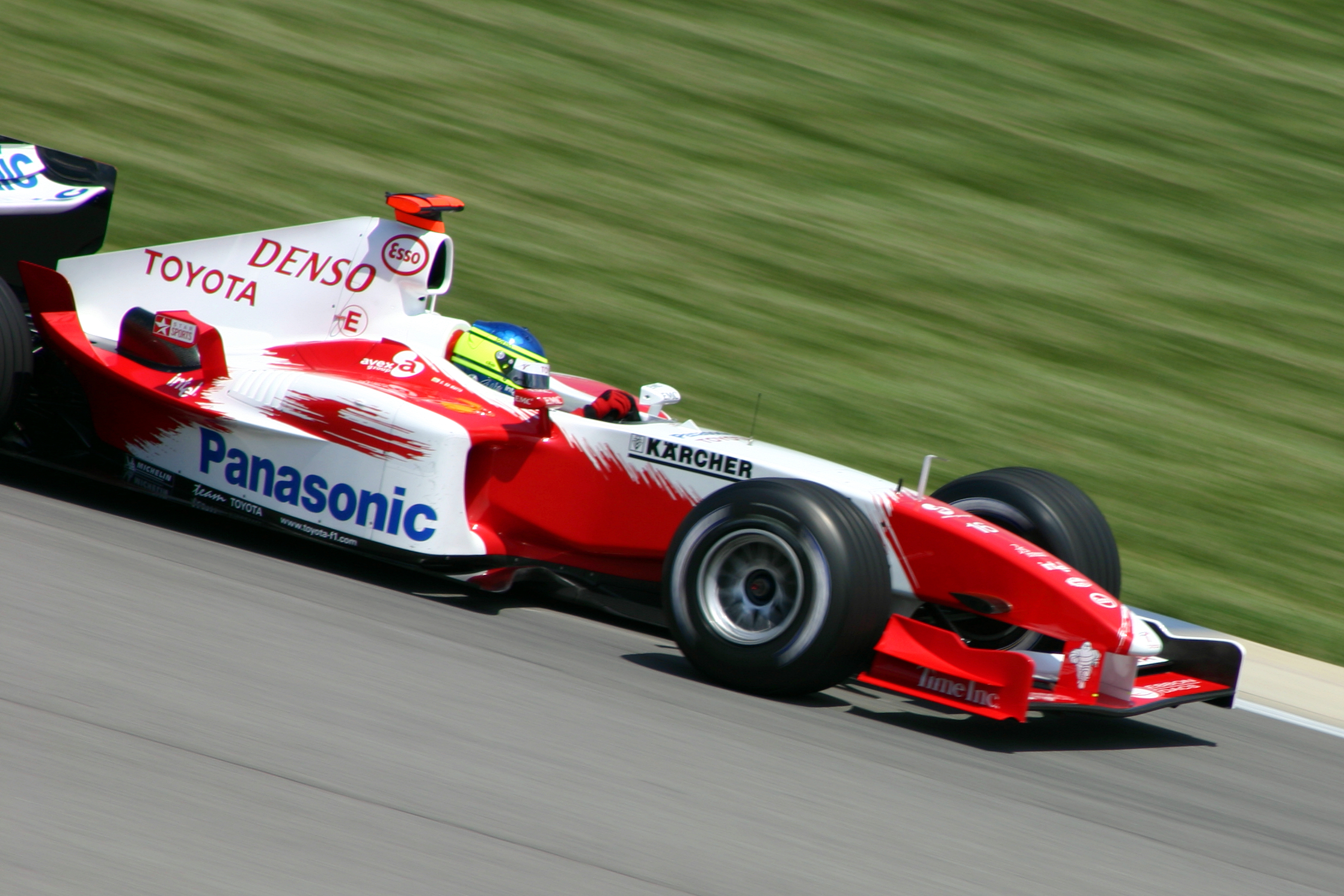
Da Matta driving for the Toyota team at the 2004 United States Grand Prix.

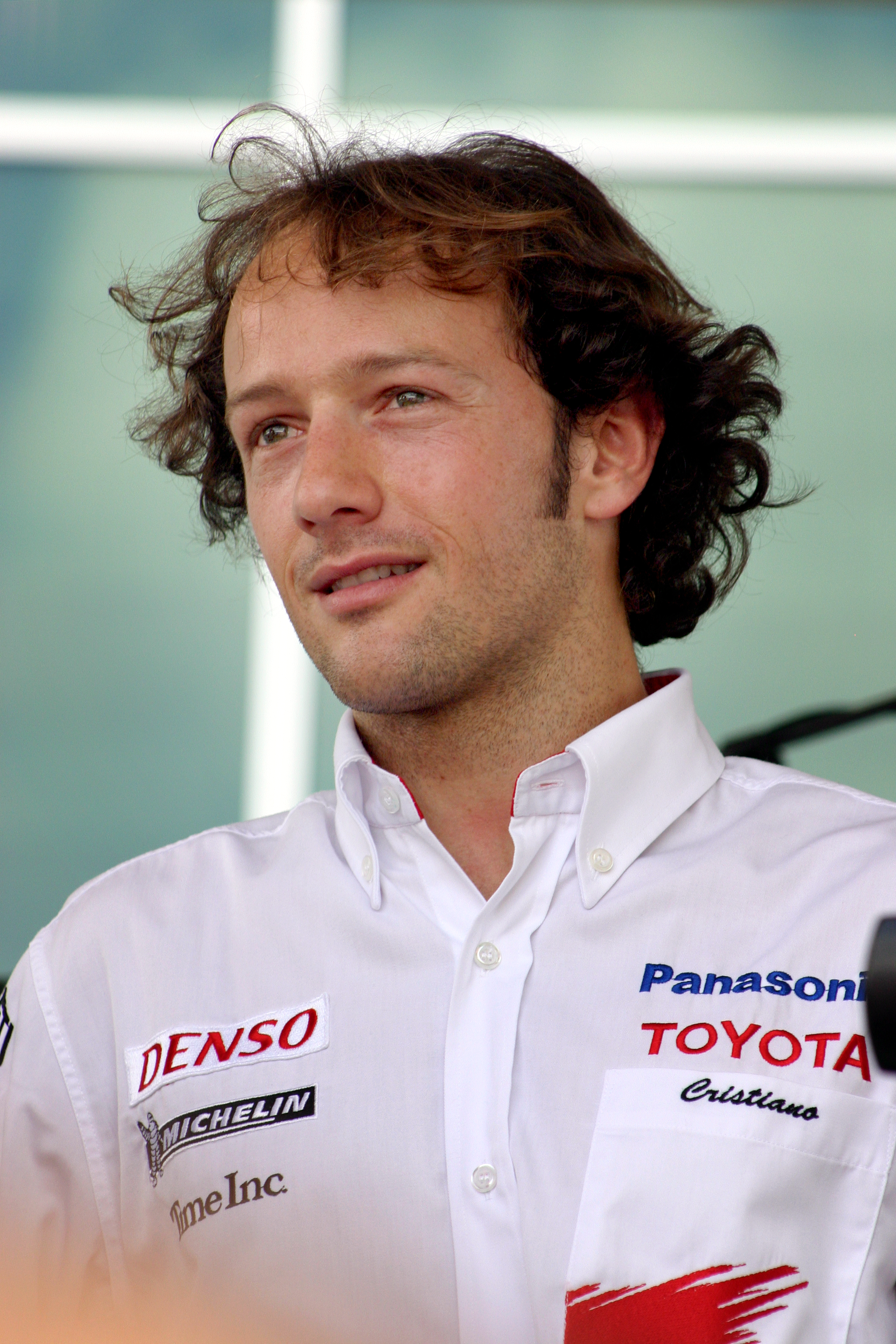
Cristiano da Matta in 2004.

Da Matta completed a move to Formula One in 2003, with the Toyota Formula One team. He scored 10 championship points that year, four more than seasoned veteran and teammate Olivier Panis, and soon made a name for himself in Formula One when he spent much of the first half of the 2003 Brazilian Grand Prix hounding reigning World Champion Michael Schumacher in the monsoon-hit race before ultimately finishing tenth. He led the 2003 British Grand Prix for seventeen laps after the race was disrupted by a protester who invaded the track and triggered the deployment of the Safety Car. This caused most of the front-running cars to make unscheduled pit stops leaving da Matta in the lead, ultimately finishing seventh for one of four points-scoring finishes in his debut season. His fortunes took a downturn in 2004, however. Having scored only three championship points, da Matta lost his race seat to Ricardo Zonta after the German Grand Prix in Hockenheim. This was not only due to performance issues, but also due to da Matta openly making statements about how uncompetitive the Toyota was.

=== Return to USA ===
In 2005, da Matta moved back to the Champ Car World Series, to race for the PKV Racing team. That season, he won the race at Portland, and finished 11th overall in the standings. For the 2006 Champ Car season, he switched to the Dale Coyne Racing to drive the No. 19 Ford Lola, until 9 June 2006, when he switched teams again, to take over A. J. Allmendinger's seat at RuSPORT. Second place at San Jose left him sixth overall in the series.

=== Collision with deer during test ===
On 3 August 2006, da Matta's car was involved in a collision with a deer that ran in front of him as he headed towards turn 6 during Champ Car open testing at Road America. He hit the deer with his right front tire, the deer then flew back and hit da Matta in the cockpit. It is believed when the deer hit da Matta in the cockpit, he was knocked unconscious. He remained unconscious with his foot still on the throttle when the safety crew arrived and extricated da Matta from the car. Da Matta was then airlifted to Theda Clark Medical Center in Neenah, Wisconsin, where he underwent surgery to remove a subdural hematoma. Following the surgery, da Matta was placed in an induced coma, to allow for the swelling to subside. As of 7 August, da Matta was making "slow but steady progress", while the doctors were working on reducing da Matta's level of sedation. This slow recovery was confirmed on 9 August, as it was reported that da Matta was able to move "all of his extremities spontaneously as well as in response to physical stimulation". On 20 August, da Matta was transferred out of intensive care. On 30 August, da Matta was confirmed to have made steady progress, conversing in English and Portuguese, and walking short distances. On 21 September 2006, da Matta was allowed to leave the hospital after having recovered better than expected.

When the Champ Car World Series returned to race in the Grand Prix of Road America on 24 September, da Matta gave the traditional command - "start your engines". Throughout the next couple of years, he engaged in a training and therapy regime while deciding his racing future.

=== Comeback ===
On 20 March 2008, da Matta climbed back into a race car for the first time since his accident, completing a two-day test in a Riley Daytona Prototype prepared by reigning Rolex Sports Car Series champions GAINSCO/Bob Stallings Racing. He found speed right away, and team owner Bob Stallings said "the comeback has begun." da Matta said, "After the test, I realized I still know how to do this", "The biggest thing I felt was just a sense of relief. For me, it was a big, big relief, bigger than big". da Matta paired with former Champ Car champion, Jimmy Vasser, to enter the Rolex Series racing at Mazda Raceway Laguna Seca in 2008. after a solid race, the pair were classified in 32nd position.

=== Brazilian Championship Formula Truck ===
In December 2009, da Matta tested a Fórmula Truck vehicle owned by Iveco, and in January 2010 confirmed that he would run the 2010 Fórmula Truck season for the team.

=== American Le Mans Series ===
In 2011, da Matta signed for Rocketsports Racing to race in the American Le Mans Series. He scored six points at the Grand Prix of Long Beach.

== Film and media ==
Da Matta and his 1999 car appear in the movie Driven, starring Sylvester Stallone.

Da Matta is a playable character in the video games Formula One 2003 and Formula One 04.

In 2017, a documentary was released about his and his father's lives in motorsport, entitled "Família Gasolina" (Gasoline Family). It is available for free on YouTube.

== Post-racing career ==
Da Matta is no longer racing and is involved in the financial and logistical side of the family Da Matta Design clothing business.

== Racing career ==
=== Career summary ===
Season	Series	Team	Races	Wins	Poles	F/Laps	Podiums	Points	Position
1993	Brazilian Formula Ford Championship	?	?	4	4	?	?	?	1st
1994	Formula 3 Sudamericana	?	?	4	7	?	?	?	1st
1995	British Formula Three Championship	West Surrey Racing	18	1	0	1	3	81	8th
1996	International Formula 3000 Championship	Pacific Racing	10	0	0	0	0	7	9th
1997	Indy Lights	Brian Stewart Racing	13	3	1	4	5	141	3rd
1998	Indy Lights	Tasman Motorsports	14	4	3	4	8	154	1st
1999	CART FedEx Championship Series	Arciero-Wells Racing	20	0	0	0	0	32	18th
2000	CART FedEx Championship Series	PPI Motorsports	20	1	0	0	2	112	10th
2001	CART FedEx Championship Series	Newman/Haas Racing	20	3	0	0	5	140	5th
2002	CART FedEx Championship Series	Newman/Haas Racing	19	7	7	6	11	237	1st
2003	Formula One	Panasonic Toyota Racing	16	0	0	0	0	10	13th
2004	Formula One	Panasonic Toyota Racing	12	0	0	0	0	3	17th
2005	Champ Car World Series	PKV Racing	13	1	0	0	1	139	11th
2006	Champ Car World Series	Dale Coyne Racing	4	0	0	0	0	134	13th
2006	Champ Car World Series	RuSPORT	5	0	0	0	1	134	13th
2008	Rolex Sports Car Series	GAINSCO/Bob Stallings Racing	2	0	0	0	0	41	45th
2010	Fórmula Truck	Scuderia Iveco	10	0	0	0	0	13	23rd
2011	American Le Mans Series	Jaguar RSR	3	0	0	0	0	6	30th
2017	Fórmula Truck	Scuderia Iveco	2	0	0	0	0	13	13th

=== Complete British Formula Three Championship results ===
(key) (Races in bold indicate pole position) (Races in italics indicate fastest lap)

Year	Entrant	Engine	Class	1	2	3	4	5	6	7	8	9	10	11	12	13	14	15	16	17	18	DC	Pts
1995	West Surrey Racing	Mugen	A	SIL; 2	SIL; 4	THR; Ret	THR; Ret	DON; Ret	SIL; DSQ	SIL; Ret	DON; 11	DON; 16	OUL; 1	BRH; 3	BRH; 6	SNE; 20	PEM; Ret	PEM; 5	SIL; 9	SIL; 6	THR; Ret	8th	81

=== Complete International Formula 3000 results ===
(key) (Races in bold indicate pole position) (Races in italics indicate fastest lap)

Year	Entrant	1	2	3	4	5	6	7	8	9	10	DC	Points
1996	Pacific Racing	NÜR; 9	PAU; 4	PER; 5	HOC; Ret	SIL; Ret	SPA; 10	MAG; 5	EST; 7	MUG; Ret	HOC; Ret	9th	7

=== Complete Indy Lights results ===
(key)

Year	Team	1	2	3	4	5	6	7	8	9	10	11	12	13	14	Rank	Points	Ref
1997	Brian Stewart Racing	MIA; 21	LBH; 2	NAZ; 1	SAV; 21	STL; 2	MIL; 4	DET; 26	POR; 5	TOR; 18	TRO; 4	**VAN**; 1	LS; 1	FON; 4		**3rd**	**141**	
1998	Tasman Motorsports	MIA; 2	LBH; 1	**NAZ**; 1	STL; 3	MIL; 10	DET; 2	POR; 20	CLE; 22	TOR; 15	MIS; 2	**TRO**; 1	**VAN**; 1	LS; 22	FON; 11	**1st**	**154**	

=== Complete CART/Champ Car results ===
(key)

Year	Team	No.	Chassis	Engine	1	2	3	4	5	6	7	8	9	10	11	12	13	14	15	16	17	18	19	20	21	Rank	Points	Ref
1999	Arciero-Wells Racing	25	Reynard 99i	Toyota RV8D	MIA; 14	MOT; 25	LBH; 20	NAZ; 4	RIO; 21	GAT; 17	MIL; 11	POR; 11	CLE; 20	ROA; 21	TOR; 24	MIC; 17	DET; 19	MDO; 9	CHI; 14	VAN; 5	LS; 22	HOU; 11	SRF; 13	FON; 23		18th	32	
2000	PPI Motorsports	97	Reynard 2Ki	Toyota RV8E	MIA; 12	LBH; 25	RIO; 4	MOT; 4	NAZ; 13	MIL; 14	DET; 23	POR; 5	CLE; 3	TOR; 4*	MIC; 17	CHI; 1	MDO; 17	ROA; 13	VAN; 7	LS; 15	GAT; 4	HOU; 14	SRF; 4	FON; 25		10th	112	
2001	Newman/Haas Racing	6	Lola B01/00	Toyota RV8F	MTY; 1*	LBH; 2	TEX; C	NAZ; 10	MOT; 25	MIL; 25	DET; 7	POR; 10	CLE; 7	TOR; 15	MIC; 4	CHI; 19	MDO; 10	ROA; 6	VAN; 20	LAU; 26	ROC; 3	HOU; 6	LS; 20	SRF; 1	FON; 1	5th	140	
2002	Newman/Haas Racing	6	Lola B02/00	Toyota RV8F	MTY; 1*	LBH; 8	MOT; 13	MIL; 11	**LS**; 1*	**POR**; 1*	CHI; 1*	**TOR**; 1*	**CLE**; 16	**VAN**; 12	MDO; 13	ROA; 1	**MTL**; 2	DEN; 3	ROC; 2	MIA; 1*	**SRF**; 8*	FON; 11	MXC; 2			1st	237	
2005	PKV Racing	21	Lola B02/00	Ford XFE	LBH; 10	MTY; 6	MIL; 11	POR; 1*	CLE; 16	TOR; 17	EDM; 17	SJO; 10	DEN; 18	MTL; 6	LAS; 12	SRF; 19	MXC; 14									11th	139	
2006	Dale Coyne Racing	19	Lola B02/00	Ford XFE	LBH; 5	HOU; 9	MTY; 9	MIL; 13																		13th	134	
2006	RuSPORT	10	Lola B02/00	Ford XFE					POR; 5	CLE; 14	TOR; 5	EDM; 18	SJO; 2	DEN	MTL	ROA	SRF	MXC								13th	134	

=== Complete Formula One results ===
(key) (Races in bold indicate pole position; races in italics indicate fastest lap)

Year	Entrant	Chassis	Engine	1	2	3	4	5	6	7	8	9	10	11	12	13	14	15	16	17	18	WDC	Pts.
2003	Panasonic Toyota Racing	Toyota TF103	Toyota RVX-03 3.0 V10	AUS; Ret	MAL; 11	BRA; 10	SMR; 12	ESP; 6	AUT; 10	MON; 9	CAN; 11^{†}	EUR; Ret	FRA; 11	GBR; 7	GER; 6	HUN; 11	ITA; Ret	USA; 9	JPN; 7			13th	10
2004	Panasonic Toyota Racing	Toyota TF104	Toyota RVX-04 3.0 V10	AUS; 12	MAL; 9	BHR; 10	SMR; Ret	ESP; 13	MON; 6	EUR; Ret	CAN; DSQ	USA; Ret	FRA; 14	GBR; 13	GER; Ret	HUN	BEL	ITA	CHN	JPN	BRA	17th	3

^{†} Did not finish the race, but was classified as he had completed more than 90% of the race distance.

=== Complete Fórmula Truck results ===
Year	Entrant	Truck	1	2	3	4	5	6	7	8	9	10	DC	Points
2010	Scuderia Iveco	Iveco	GUA; 16	RIO; 13	CAR; Ret	CAM; Ret	INT; 13	LON; 13	JOG; 8	VEL; Ret	CUR; Ret	BRA; 15	23rd	13

=== Complete American Le Mans Series results ===
Year	Entrant	Class	Chassis	Engine	1	2	3	4	5	6	7	8	9	Rank	Points	Ref
2011	Jaguar RSR	GT	Jaguar XKR GT2	Jaguar 5.0 L V8	SEB; Ret	LBH; 6	LIM; Ret	MOS	MID	AME	BAL	MON	PET	26th	6	

Sporting positions
Preceded by Norio Matsubara	Brazilian Formula Ford Championship; Champion; 1993	Succeeded by Marcelo Carneiro
Preceded by Fernando Croceri	Brazilian Formula 3 Championship; Champion; 1994	Succeeded by Ricardo Zonta
Preceded by Tony Kanaan	Indy Lights; Champion; 1998	Succeeded by Oriol Servià
Preceded by Gil de Ferran	Champ Car World Series; Champion; 2002	Succeeded by Paul Tracy
Preceded by Colin Edwards; Jeff Gordon; Jimmie Johnson	Race of Champions; Nations' Cup; 2003; With: Fonsi Nieto & Gilles Panizzi	Succeeded by Jean Alesi; Sébastien Loeb
