= 1993 Barber Saab Pro Series =

1993 Barber Saab Pro Series season

Seasons
- ← 1992 1994 →

The 1993 Barber Saab Pro Series season was the ninth season of the series. Zerex continued to support the racing series. All drivers used Saab powered Goodyear shod Mondiale chassis. Swede Kenny Bräck won the championship. Bräck raced in the International Formula 3000 the following season.

== Race calendar and results ==
| Round | Circuit | Location | Date | Winner |
|---|---|---|---|---|
| 1 | Bicentennial Park | (United States) Miami, Florida | February 21 | (Sweden) Kenny Bräck |
| 2 | Sebring International Raceway | (United States) Sebring, Florida | March 20 | (Sweden) Kenny Bräck |
| 3 | Atlanta Motor Speedway | (United States) Braselton, Georgia | April 18 | (United States) Alex Padilla |
| 4 | Lime Rock Park | (United States) Lime Rock, Connecticut | May 31 | (Sweden) Kenny Bräck |
| 5 | Detroit Belle Isle Grand Prix | (United States) Detroit, Michigan | June 13 | (Sweden) Kenny Bräck |
| 6 | Watkins Glen International | (United States) Watkins Glen, New York | June 27 | (Sweden) Kenny Bräck |
| 7 | Road America | (United States) Elkhart Lake, Wisconsin | July 11 | (Italy) Ricardo Dona |
| 8 | Mazda Raceway Laguna Seca | (United States) Monterey County, California | July 25 | (United States) Alex Padilla |
| 9 | New Hampshire Motor Speedway | (United States) Loudon, New Hampshire | August 8 | (United States) Jerry Nadeau |
| 10 | Road America | (United States) Elkhart Lake, Wisconsin | August 22 | (Sweden) Kenny Bräck |
| 11 | Mid-Ohio Sports Car Course | (United States) Lexington, Ohio | September 12 | (United States) Alex Padilla |
| 12 | Phoenix International Raceway | (United States) Phoenix, Arizona | October 3 | (United States) Brandon Sperling |

== Final standings ==
| Color | Result |
|---|---|
| Gold | Winner |
| Silver | 2nd place |
| Bronze | 3rd place |
| Green | 4th & 5th place |
| Light Blue | 6th–10th place |
| Dark Blue | 11th place or lower |
| Purple | Did not finish |
| Red | Did not qualify (DNQ) |
| Brown | Withdrawn (Wth) |
| Black | Disqualified (DSQ) |
| White | Did not start (DNS) |
| Blank | Did not participate (DNP) |
| Blank | Driver replacement (Rpl) |
| Blank | Injured (Inj) |
| Blank | No race held (NH) |

| Rank | Driver | (United States) BIC | (United States) SEB | (United States) ATL | (United States) LRP | (United States) DET | (United States) WGI | (United States) ROA1 | (United States) LAG | (United States) NHS | (United States) ROA2 | (United States) MOH | (United States) PIR | Points |
|---|---|---|---|---|---|---|---|---|---|---|---|---|---|---|
| 1 | (Sweden) Kenny Bräck | 1 | 1 | | 1 | 1 | 1 | 20 | | 4 | 1 | | 10 | 142 |
| 2 | (United States) Brandon Sperling | | 5 | | | 2 | | 5 | | 5 | | | 1 | 125 |
| 3 | (United States) Alex Padilla | | 7 | 1 | | 3 | | 21 | 1 | 2 | | 1 | 3 | 119 |
| 4 | (Colombia) Diego Guzman | | 4 | | | 14 | | 18 | | 3 | | | 2 | 106 |
| 5 | (United States) Jerry Nadeau | | 2 | | | 22 | | 19 | | 1 | | | 4 | 79 |
| 6 | (Italy) Riccardo Dona | | | | | 4 | | 1 | | 17 | | | 6 | 74 |
| 7 | (United States) Bill Adams | | 6 | | | 12 | | 15 | | 11 | | | 5 | 66 |
| 8 | (United States) Barry Waddell | | 3 | | | 24 | | 2 | | 12 | | | | 65 |
| 9 | (United States) Geoff Boss | | 8 | | | | | 7 | | 8 | | | 8 | 39 |
| 10 | (United States) Andy Boss | | 14 | | | 18 | | 4 | | 9 | | | 9 | 38 |
| | (Canada) Sohrab Amirsardari | | | | | | | | | 13 | | | | |
| | (United States) David Austin | | | | | 11 | | | | | | | | |
| | (United States) Aaron Bambach | | | | | 16 | | | | | | | | |
| | (United States) Royce de Rohan Barondes | | 16 | | | | | | | | | | | |
| | (United States) Greg Borland | | 17 | | | | | | | | | | | |
| | (United States) Zak Brown | | | | | 23 | | | | | | | | |
| | (United States) Kyle Chura | | | | | 7 | | | | | | | | |
| | (United States) Paul Dallenbach | | 15 | | | | | | | | | | | |
| | (France) Marc Delpierre | | | | | | | | | 6 | | | | |
| | (United States) Jon Field | | 18 | | | 19 | | 9 | | | | | | |
| | (United States) Brad Funk | | 13 | | | 20 | | 3 | | 10 | | | 7 | |
| | (United Kingdom) Divina Galica | | | | | 9 | | | | | | | 12 | |
| | (Mexico) Claudio Hall Van Beuren | | 9 | | | 21 | | 6 | | 15 | | | | |
| | (United States) Dave Holz | | 12 | | | | | 10 | | | | | | |
| | (United States) Jeffrey Jones | | | | | 10 | | | | 16 | | | | |
| | (Netherlands) Martijn Koene | | | | | 6 | | | | | | | | |
| | (United States) Peter MacLeod | | | | | 13 | | 11 | | | | | | |
| | (United States) Tom Mitchell | | | | | | | 16 | | | | | | |
| | (United States) Jeff Morton | | | | | 17 | | | | | | | | |
| | (United States) Glen Mullins | | | | | 25 | | | | | | | | |
| | (United States) Dan Nye | | | | | | | 14 | | | | | | |
| | (United States) Will Pace | | | | | | | 13 | | | | | | |
| | (United States) Leo Parente | | 11 | | | | | | | | | | | |
| | (Mexico) Jesus Silva | | 19 | | | | | | | | | | | |
| | (United States) Steve Pelke | | | | | | | 17 | | | | | | |
| | (United Kingdom) Rory Passey | | | | | | | | | | | | 13 | |
| | (United States) Tom Semik | | | | | 8 | | | | | | | | |
| | (Mexico) Jesus Silva | | 19 | | | | | | | | | | | |
| | (United States) Wes Short | | 10 | | | 15 | | 8 | | | | | | |
| | (United States) Luis Zervigon | | 20 | | | 5 | | 12 | | 7 | | | 11 | |
