= Alex Padilla (racing driver) =

American racing driver

Alex Padilla is a former American racing driver.

== Career ==
Padilla began his professional career in the Barber Saab Pro Series in 1992 and finished fourth in the championship. He also drove in the 24 Hours of Daytona for Alex Job Racing and finished 18th overall and fifth in class in a Porsche 911. In 1993, he captured three wins on his way to third place in the Barber Saab Pro Series. 1994 brought him to the Indy Lights series full-time (he had made his series debut in a one-off in 1992). Padilla won the pole in Vancouver and finished seventh in points. In 1995, Padilla could not secure a full-time ride after the first four races and competed in only three of the last eight races but still managed to finish 11th in the championship. He returned to the series full-time in 1996 and finished sixth in points with a pair of runner-up finishes in the Detroit and Portland races. In 1998, he competed in the Latin American Indy Lights Panamericana series and finished 5th in points.

== Personal life ==
At one point of his life, Padilla lived in Sacramento, California.
