= 1998 Indy Lights season =

- PPG/Dayton Indy Lights Championship

Season
- Races: 14
- Start date: March 15
- End date: October 31

Awards
- Drivers' champion: (Brazil) Cristiano da Matta

The 1998 CART PPG/Dayton Indy Lights Championship consisted of 14 races. Future 2002 CART champion and Formula One driver Cristiano da Matta captured four wins on his way to the championship.

The scoring system was 20-16-14-12-10-8-6-5-4-3-2-1 points awarded to the first 12 (twelve) finishers, with 1 (one) extra point given to the driver who took pole-position, and another extra point given to the driver who led most laps in the race.

== Team and driver chart ==
The following drivers and teams competed in the series:

Team	No.	Drivers	Round(s)
Brian Stewart Racing	4	(Brazil) Sérgio Paese	14
Brian Stewart Racing	3	(Brazil) Sérgio Paese	1–11
Brian Stewart Racing	3	(Belgium) Wim Eyckmans	12–14
Brian Stewart Racing	5	(Sweden) Mattias Andersson	1–3
Brian Stewart Racing	5	(Brazil) Luiz Garcia Jr.	4–14
Conquest Racing	11	(United States) Andy Boss	All
Conquest Racing	21	(Brazil) Felipe Giaffone	All
Dorricott Racing	30	(United States) Bud Kaeding	4–5, 10, 14
Dorricott Racing	31	(Austria) Philipp Peter	All
Dorricott Racing	32	(Spain) Oriol Servià	All
Genoa Racing	61	(Canada) Eric Jensen	2
Genoa Racing	61	(United States) Cory Witherill	7, 12–14
Indy Regency Racing	16	(Japan) Shigeaki Hattori	All
Indy Regency Racing	28	(Mexico) Rodolfo Lavín	1–7, 9–10, 12–13
Irish Motorsports / Bordin Racing	56	(United States) Tim Moser	2
Johansson Motorsports	6	(United Kingdom) Guy Smith	All
Johansson Motorsports	7	(Brazil) Luiz Garcia Jr.	1–2
Lucas Place Motorsports	14	(United States) Geoff Boss	All
Lucas Place Motorsports	15	(United States) Brian Cunningham	All
Mattco Raceworks	77	(United States) Tony Renna	1–11, 13–14
Mattco Raceworks	77	(United States) Mark Hotchkis	12
Mattco Raceworks	78	(United States) Mark Hotchkis	3–6
Mattco Raceworks	78	(United States) Chris Simmons	1–2, 7–14
Mattco Raceworks	79	(United States) Mark Hotchkis	14
Mears Racing Team	8	(United States) Clint Mears	1, 3–6, 8, 10, 13–14
Mears Racing Team	9	(United States) Casey Mears	1–6, 8, 10, 13–14
PacWest Lights	17	(Australia) Paul Morris	1–12
PacWest Lights	17	(United States) Paul Jasper	14
PacWest Lights	18	(France) Didier André	All
Quaker State Team Go Herdez Competition Team	87	(Mexico) Jorge Goeters	1–11, 14
Quaker State Team Go Herdez Competition Team	87	(Mexico) Mario Domínguez	12–13
Quaker State Team Go Herdez Competition Team	88	(Republic of Ireland) Derek Higgins	All
Tasman Motorsports	1	(Brazil) Airton Daré	All
Tasman Motorsports	2	(Brazil) Cristiano da Matta	All
Team KOOL Green	26	(United States) Mark Hotchkis	11
Team KOOL Green	27	(Japan) Naoki Hattori	All
Team Rahal	41	(United States) Mike Borkowski	All

== Schedule ==
Rd.	Date	Track	Location
1	March 15	O Homestead-Miami Speedway	Homestead, Florida
2	April 5	R Long Beach Street Circuit	Long Beach, California
3	April 27	O Nazareth Speedway	Nazareth, Pennsylvania
4	May 23	O Gateway International Raceway	Madison, Illinois
5	May 31	O Milwaukee Mile	West Allis, Wisconsin
6	June 7	R The Raceway at Belle Isle Park	Detroit, Michigan
7	June 21	R Portland International Raceway	Portland, Oregon
8	July 12	R Cleveland Burke Lakefront Airport	Cleveland, Ohio
9	July 19	R Exhibition Place	Toronto, Ontario
10	July 25	O Michigan International Speedway	Brooklyn, Michigan
11	August 2	R Circuit Trois-Rivières	Trois-Rivières, Quebec
12	September 6	R Streets of Vancouver	Vancouver, British Columbia
13	September 13	R Laguna Seca Raceway	Monterey, California
14	October 31	O California Speedway	Fontana, California

== Race results ==
Round	Circuit	Pole position	Fastest lap	Most laps led	Race Winner	
Round	Circuit	Pole position	Fastest lap	Most laps led	Driver	Team
1	(United States) Homestead-Miami Speedway	(Brazil) Sérgio Paese	(Japan) Shigeaki Hattori	(Japan) Shigeaki Hattori	(Japan) Shigeaki Hattori	Indy Regency Racing
2	(United States) Long Beach Street Circuit	(France) Didier André	(Brazil) Cristiano da Matta	(Brazil) Cristiano da Matta	(Brazil) Cristiano da Matta	Tasman Motorsports
3	(United States) Nazareth Speedway	(Brazil) Cristiano da Matta	(Brazil) Cristiano da Matta	(Brazil) Cristiano da Matta	(Brazil) Cristiano da Matta	Tasman Motorsports
4	(United States) Gateway International Raceway	(Mexico) Jorge Goeters (Note: Qualifying was cancelled due to rain. The grid was set by practice times, and no bonus point was awarded.)	(Japan) Shigeaki Hattori	(Japan) Shigeaki Hattori	(Japan) Shigeaki Hattori	Indy Regency Racing
5	(United States) Milwaukee Mile	(Brazil) Sérgio Paese	(Republic of Ireland) Derek Higgins	(Republic of Ireland) Derek Higgins	(Republic of Ireland) Derek Higgins	Herdez Competition Team
6	(United States) The Raceway at Belle Isle Park	(Brazil) Airton Daré	(Brazil) Airton Daré	(Brazil) Airton Daré	(Brazil) Airton Daré	Tasman Motorsports
7	(United States) Portland International Raceway	(United Kingdom) Guy Smith	(France) Didier André	(United Kingdom) Guy Smith	(United Kingdom) Guy Smith	Johansson Motorsports
8	(United States) Cleveland Burke Lakefront Airport	(Brazil) Luiz Garcia Jr.	(Brazil) Sérgio Paese	(Brazil) Luiz Garcia Jr.	(Brazil) Luiz Garcia Jr.	Brian Stewart Racing
9	(Canada) Exhibition Place	(United Kingdom) Guy Smith	(Brazil) Luiz Garcia Jr.	(United Kingdom) Guy Smith	(United Kingdom) Guy Smith	Johansson Motorsports
10	(United States) Michigan International Speedway	(United States) Tony Renna	(Brazil) Sérgio Paese	(United States) Tony Renna	(United States) Tony Renna	Mattco Raceworks
11	(Canada) Circuit Trois-Rivières	(Brazil) Cristiano da Matta	(Brazil) Cristiano da Matta	(Brazil) Cristiano da Matta	(Brazil) Cristiano da Matta	Tasman Motorsports
12	(Canada) Streets of Vancouver	(Brazil) Cristiano da Matta	(Brazil) Cristiano da Matta	(Brazil) Cristiano da Matta	(Brazil) Cristiano da Matta	Tasman Motorsports
13	(United States) Laguna Seca Raceway	(France) Didier André	(United States) Chris Simmons	(France) Didier André	(France) Didier André	PacWest Lights
14	(United States) California Speedway	(United States) Tony Renna	(Brazil) Airton Daré	(United States) Tony Renna	(United States) Mark Hotchkis	Mattco Raceworks

== Race summaries ==
=== Homestead race ===
- March 15, 1998
- Homestead-Miami Speedway, Miami, Florida
- Pole position: Sérgio Paese, 0:30.098, 179.653 mph (289.123 km/h)

Top Five Finishers
Fin. Pos	St. Pos	Car No.	Driver	Team	Laps	Time	Laps Led	Points
1	2	16	(Japan) Shigeaki Hattori	Indy Regency Racing	67	52:35.077	64	21
2	4	2	(Brazil) Cristiano da Matta	Tasman Motorsports	67	+0.468	0	16
3	7	6	(United Kingdom) Guy Smith	Johansson Motorsports	67	+1.420	0	14
4	6	32	(Spain) Oriol Servià	Dorricott Racing	67	+5.534	0	12
5	9	78	(United States) Chris Simmons	Mattco Raceworks	67	+6.853	0	10
Race average speed: 114.825 mph (184.793 km/h)
Lead changes: 1 between 2 drivers
Cautions: 3 for 21 laps

=== Long Beach race ===
- April 5, 1998
- Long Beach Grand Prix, Long Beach, California
- Pole position: Didier André, 0:57.108, 99.223 mph (159.684 km/h)

Top Five Finishers
Fin. Pos	St. Pos	Car No.	Driver	Team	Laps	Time	Laps Led	Points
1	2	2	(Brazil) Cristiano da Matta	Tasman Motorsports	47	49:20.748	47	21
2	4	14	(United States) Geoff Boss	Lucas Place Motorsports	47	+0.459	0	16
3	6	27	(Japan) Naoki Hattori	Team KOOL Green	47	+1.083	0	14
4	5	31	(Austria) Philipp Peter	Dorricott Racing	47	+3.378	0	12
5	1	18	(France) Didier André	PacWest Lights	47	+7.317	0	11
Race average speed: 89.951 mph (144.762 km/h)
Lead changes: none
Cautions: 2 for 6 laps

=== Nazareth race ===
- April 27, 1998
- Nazareth Speedway, Nazareth, Pennsylvania
- Pole position: Cristiano da Matta, 0:22.408, 151.981 mph (244.590 km/h)

Top Five Finishers
Fin. Pos	St. Pos	Car No.	Driver	Team	Laps	Time	Laps Led	Points
1	1	2	(Brazil) Cristiano da Matta	Tasman Motorsports	100	55:56.268	100	22
2	9	18	(France) Didier André	PacWest Lights	100	+14.174	0	16
3	8	9	(United States) Casey Mears	Mears Racing Team	100	+14.745	0	14
4	5	15	(United States) Brian Cunningham	Lucas Place Motorsports	100	+17.914	0	12
5	11	1	(Brazil) Airton Daré	Tasman Motorsports	100	+18.725	0	10
Race average speed: 101.470 mph (163.300 km/h)
Lead changes: none
Cautions: 2 for 30 laps

=== Gateway race ===
Held May 23 at Gateway International Raceway. Jorge Goeters won the pole. No qualifying held due to rain. The line up was based on combined practice times.

Top Five Results

1. Shigeaki Hattori
2. Philipp Peter
3. Cristiano da Matta
4. Felipe Giaffone
5. Jorge Goeters

=== Milwaukee race ===
Held May 31 at The Milwaukee Mile. Sérgio Paese won the pole.

Top Five Results

1. Derek Higgins
2. Felipe Giaffone
3. Sérgio Paese
4. Geoff Boss
5. Tony Renna

=== Detroit race ===
Held June 7 at Belle Isle Raceway. Airton Daré won the pole.

Top Five Results

1. Airton Daré
2. Cristiano da Matta
3. Geoff Boss
4. Mark Hotchkis
5. Didier André

=== Portland race ===
Held June 21 at Portland International Raceway. Guy Smith won the pole.

Top Five Results

1. Guy Smith
2. Felipe Giaffone
3. Luiz Garcia Jr.
4. Airton Daré
5. Brian Cunningham

=== Cleveland race ===
Held July 12 at Burke Lakefront Airport. Luiz Garcia Jr. won the pole.

Top Five Results

1. Luiz Garcia Jr.
2. Derek Higgins
3. Didier André
4. Guy Smith
5. Tony Renna

=== Toronto race ===
Held July 19 at Exhibition Place. Guy Smith won the pole.

Top Five Results

1. Guy Smith
2. Naoki Hattori
3. Chris Simmons
4. Philipp Peter
5. Didier André

=== Michigan race ===
Held July 25 at Michigan International Speedway. Tony Renna won the pole.

Top Five Results

1. Tony Renna
2. Cristiano da Matta
3. Sérgio Paese
4. Andy Boss
5. Oriol Servià

=== Trois-Rivières race ===
Held August 2 at the Trois-Rivières, Quebec Street Circuit. Cristiano da Matta won the pole.

Top Five Results

1. Cristiano da Matta
2. Oriol Servià
3. Naoki Hattori
4. Guy Smith
5. Didier André

=== Vancouver race ===
Held September 6 at Pacific Place. Cristiano da Matta won the pole.

Top Five Results

1. Cristiano da Matta
2. Derek Higgins
3. Airton Daré
4. Mike Borkowski
5. Felipe Giaffone

=== Laguna Seca race ===
Held September 13 at Mazda Raceway Laguna Seca. Didier André won the pole.

Top Five Results

1. Didier André
2. Oriol Servià
3. Derek Higgins
4. Geoff Boss
5. Naoki Hattori

=== Fontana race ===
Held October 31 at The California Speedway. Tony Renna won the pole.

Top Five Results

1. Mark Hotchkis
2. Felipe Giaffone
3. Tony Renna
4. Cory Witherill
5. Didier André

== Championship standings ==
=== Drivers' championship ===
Scoring system

Position	**1st**	**2nd**	**3rd**	**4th**	**5th**	**6th**	**7th**	**8th**	**9th**	**10th**	**11th**	**12th**
Points	20	16	14	12	10	8	6	5	4	3	2	1

- The driver who qualifies on pole is awarded one additional point.
- An additional point is awarded to the driver who leads the most laps in a race.

Pos	Driver	HMS (United States)	LBH (United States)	NAZ (United States)	GAT (United States)	MIL (United States)	DET (United States)	POR (United States)	CLE (United States)	TOR (Canada)	MIC (United States)	TRO (Canada)	VAN (Canada)	LAG (United States)	FON (United States)	Points
1	(Brazil) Cristiano da Matta	2	1*	**1***	3	10	2	20	22	15	2	**1***	**1***	22	11	154
2	(France) Didier André	14	**5**	2	12	15	5	8	3	5	7	5	6	**1***	5	123
3	(United Kingdom) Guy Smith	3	8	21	11	22	8	**1***	4	**1***	6	4	8	15	10	110
4	(Brazil) Felipe Giaffone	19	24	8	4	2	9	2	8	6	9	6	5	18	2	104
5	(Republic of Ireland) Derek Higgins	7	21	15	6	1*	12	10	2	17	13	10	2	3	7	94
6	(Brazil) Airton Daré	17	9	5	9	8	**1***	4	13	8	19	21	3	11	15	78
7	(Spain) Oriol Servià	4	19	13	16	14	6	21	6	10	5	2	19	2	25	73
8	(United States) Tony Renna	DNS	12	10	22	5	15	12	5	21	**1***	20		8	**3***	68
9	(United States) Geoff Boss	9	2	12	15	4	3	11	20	19	14	19	7	4	18	67
10	(Japan) Naoki Hattori	18	3	7	8	12	23	16	17	2	16	3	17	5	17	66
11	(Austria) Philipp Peter	11	4	19	2	9	10	22	7	4	23	11	9	16	12	62
12	(Brazil) Luiz Garcia Jr.	22	10		20	11	21	3	**1***	11	15	12	16	6	6	60
13	(Brazil) Sérgio Paese	**21**	6	20	10	**3**	22	6	18	9	3	13			26	53
14	(Japan) Shigeaki Hattori	1*	11	14	1*	21	20	18	21	16	20	16	13	9	9	52
15	(United States) Mark Hotchkis			9	21	7	4					7	11		1	50
16	(Mexico) Jorge Goeters	16	15	11	**5^{1}**	6	16	9	9	7	21	15			20	34
17	(United States) Casey Mears	10	13	3	7	16	19		10		11			21	8	33
18	(United States) Brian Cunningham	12	22	4	23	20	7	5	12	14	22	18	10	20	24	33
19	(United States) Chris Simmons	5	23					14	15	3	10	8	18	13	14	32
20	(United States) Andy Boss	13	16	6	13	17	14	19	11	13	4	14	22	14	13	22
21	(Australia) Paul Morris	6	20	22	18	24	13	7	19	20	Wth	9	20			18
22	(United States) Mike Borkowski	20	25	16	19	18	11	15	14	12	18	17	4	17	23	15
23	(United States) Cory Witherill							13					15	12	4	13
24	(United States) Clint Mears	DNS		18	17	19	17		16		8			10	22	8
25	(Sweden) Mattias Andersson	15	7	17												6
26	(Mexico) Mario Domínguez												14	7		6
27	(Mexico) Rodolfo Lavín	8	18	DNS	24	13	18	17		18	17		21	23		5
28	(United States) Bud Kaeding				14	23					12				16	1
29	(Belgium) Wim Eyckmans												12	19	19	1
30	(United States) Tim Moser		14													0
31	(Canada) Eric Jensen		17													0
32	(United States) Paul Jasper														21	0
Pos	Driver	HMS (United States)	LBH (United States)	NAZ (United States)	GAT (United States)	MIL (United States)	DET (United States)	POR (United States)	CLE (United States)	TOR (Canada)	MIC (United States)	TRO (Canada)	VAN (Canada)	LAG (United States)	FON (United States)	Points

Color	Result
Gold	Winner
Silver	2nd place
Bronze	3rd place
Green	4th & 5th place
Light Blue	6th–10th place
Dark Blue	Finished (Outside Top 10)
Purple	Did not finish
Red	Did not qualify (DNQ)
Brown	Withdrawn (Wth)
Black	Disqualified (DSQ)
White	Did not start (DNS)
Blank	Did not participate (DNP)
Blank	Not competing

**In-line notation**
**Bold**	Pole position (1 point)
Italics	Ran fastest race lap
*	Led most race laps (2 points)
^{1}	Qualifying cancelled no bonus point awarded

- Ties in points broken by number of wins, or best finishes.
