= Bommarito Automotive Group 500 =

IndyCar Series Race at World Wide Technology Raceway

Bommarito Automotive Group 500 presented by Axalta and Valvoline

IndyCar Series
- Venue: World Wide Technology Raceway
- First race: 1997
- First ICS race: 2001
- Distance: 325 mi (523.037 km)
- Laps: 260
- Previous names: Motorola 300 (1997–2000); Gateway Indy 250 (2001–2002); Emerson Indy 250 (2003)
- Most wins (driver): Josef Newgarden (6)
- Most wins (team): Team Penske (10)
- Most wins (manufacturer): Chassis: Dallara (13); Engine: Chevrolet (8)

The Bommarito Automotive Group 500 presented by Axalta and Valvoline is an IndyCar Series race held at World Wide Technology Raceway in Madison, Illinois, United States. The event was first held as a CART series race from 1997 to 2000, initially on Memorial Day weekend. From 2001 to 2003, it was held as an Indy Racing League (IRL) event. After a hiatus of over a decade, the race returned in 2017 as part of the unified IndyCar Series.

== Race history ==
On Saturday, May 24, 1997, shortly after the construction of Gateway International Raceway (as World Wide Technology Raceway was then known), the CART series held the Motorola 300, the first major event at the facility. The race was scheduled for the day before the Indianapolis 500 of the rival IRL. Rather than stage a race directly opposite the Indy 500 (as they had done in 1996 with the U.S. 500 at Michigan), CART scheduled Gateway the day before the Indy 500 to serve as their Memorial Day weekend open-wheel alternative without direct conflict. On one instance, a couple of drivers actually competed in both events in the same weekend. The race was held on Memorial Day weekend for three seasons.

For the 2000 season, the race was moved from Memorial Day weekend to September. Track management did not want the event to be scheduled for the same weekend as the Indy 500, as it was splitting the fan base and affecting attendance. With the two races in neighboring states, fans generally chose to travel to the Indy 500 for the weekend instead. In addition, CART officials decided to leave Memorial Day weekend open to allow their teams the opportunity to cross over and compete at Indianapolis if they desired.

In 2001, the race was dropped from the CART series schedule, and it switched to the IRL. The distance was shortened, and the race became known as the Gateway Indy 250. However, the event suffered from continually declining attendance. The event was dropped altogether after 2003.

After new management at the facility in 2012, rumors began to circulate about reviving the event with the now-unified IndyCar Series. In 2015, the track was approved as a test facility.

In January 2017, a multi-year agreement was designed with Gateway Motorsports Park and the Bommarito Automotive Group. The Bommarito Automotive Group 500 was announced at the 2017 St. Louis Auto Show and added to the 2017 IndyCar Series schedule. The partnership was renewed through 2021.

In July 2020, the race was shortened to 250 miles (200 laps) to accommodate a revised schedule for the COVID-19 pandemic. The event featured two identical 200-lap races in the afternoon.

Before the start of the 2021 race, event promoters announced a contract extension with IndyCar to secure the race for an additional five years.

== Race summaries ==
=== CART FedEx Championship series ===
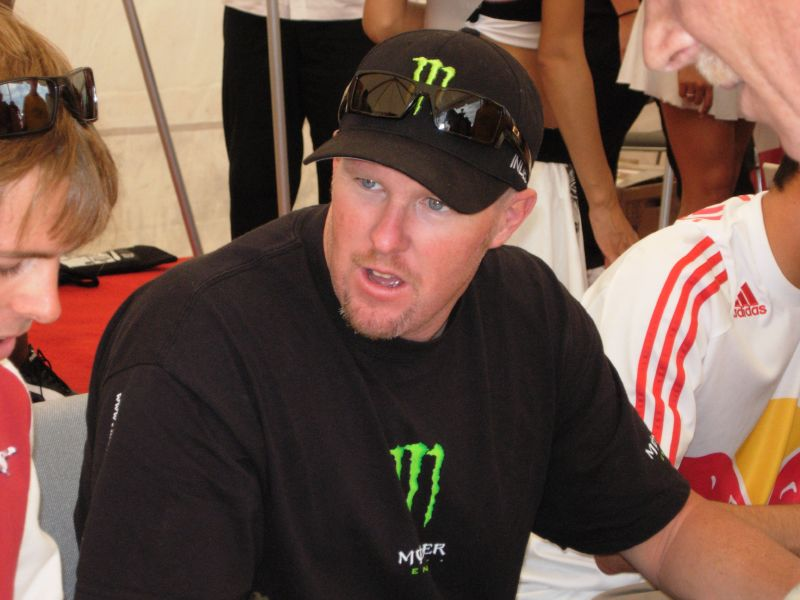
Paul Tracy won the inaugural race in 1997.

- 1997: The inaugural race was held on Saturday May 24, 1997, the day before the IRL's Indy 500. The CART series held the race as their Memorial Day weekend event, replacing the U.S. 500. A crowd of 48,500 was in attendance despite threatening skies and intermittent rain. Series rookie Dario Franchitti dropped out while leading with a broken transmission, putting Patrick Carpentier into the lead on lap 210 (of 236). Carpentier attempted to stretch his fuel over the final 60 laps, and win his first career race, and the first win for car owner Tony Bettenhausen. But in the final ten laps, Carpentier had to slow down to conserve fuel. Paul Tracy began charging to the front, passing Alex Zanardi for second with four laps to go, and set his sights on the leader. Coming out of turn four on lap 234, Tracy made a slingshot pass to take the lead with two laps to go and went on to win.
- 1998: For the second year in a row, the race was held the day before the Indy 500. CART officials mandated the use of the smaller "speedway" style front wings, in an effort to slow the cars down. But some drivers complained it made the track too difficult to drive. Rain plagued practice and qualifying on Thursday and Friday, but a large crowd of 49,500 arrived on race day. On the first lap, Dario Franchitti spun and crashed in turn three. His Team Green teammate Paul Tracy became collected in the crash as well. Michael Andretti led 133 laps, but the race came down to the final round of pit stops. A caution on lap 175 sent all of the leaders to the pits for fuel. Alex Zanardi had a faster pit stop, putting him out front with 61 laps to go. Andretti chased down Zanardi, closing to within 0.2 seconds of the lead, but was unable to make a challenge for the lead. Zanardi won the race, his second career oval win, and first victory on a short oval.
- 1999: For the third and final time, the race was held on the Saturday of Memorial Day weekend, the day before the Indy 500. On the final round of pit stops on lap 200 (of 236), Michael Andretti took on fuel only, vaulting him from fifth place to first place. Looking for his first career victory, Hélio Castroneves, with fresher tires closed to within 0.37 seconds on lap 207. Andretti, however, held off the challenge and broke a 23-race winless streak. The win came thirty years after his father Mario won the Indy 500. With the open wheel "split" still ongoing, Andretti was still absent from Indy, and the race win on Memorial Day weekend was bittersweet to the younger Andretti. Two drivers, Robby Gordon and Roberto Moreno, did "double duty" for the weekend. Both drivers raced at Gateway on Saturday, then competed at the Indianapolis 500 on Sunday. Moreno finished 4th at Gateway but dropped out at Indianapolis with transmission failure. Gordon crashed and finished last at Gateway. At Indy the next day, he ran out of fuel while leading with just over one lap to go. After two years of strong attendance, the crowd estimate for 1999 was down to about 35,000-40,000.
- 2000: After three years on Memorial Day weekend, the race was moved to September. With only three races remaining in the CART championship, the race results shuffled the points standings. Michael Andretti led 121 laps, lapping the entire field except for second place Juan Pablo Montoya. However, Andretti blew his engine on lap 197 (of 236) handing the lead and the win to Montoya. Andretti lost an opportunity to take the points lead. Paul Tracy moved up to second place in the closing laps, but he suffered a broken gearbox on lap 209, which sent him into the wall. It would be the final CART series race at Gateway, and the attendance dropped to 25,000 spectators.

=== Indy Racing League / IndyCar Series ===
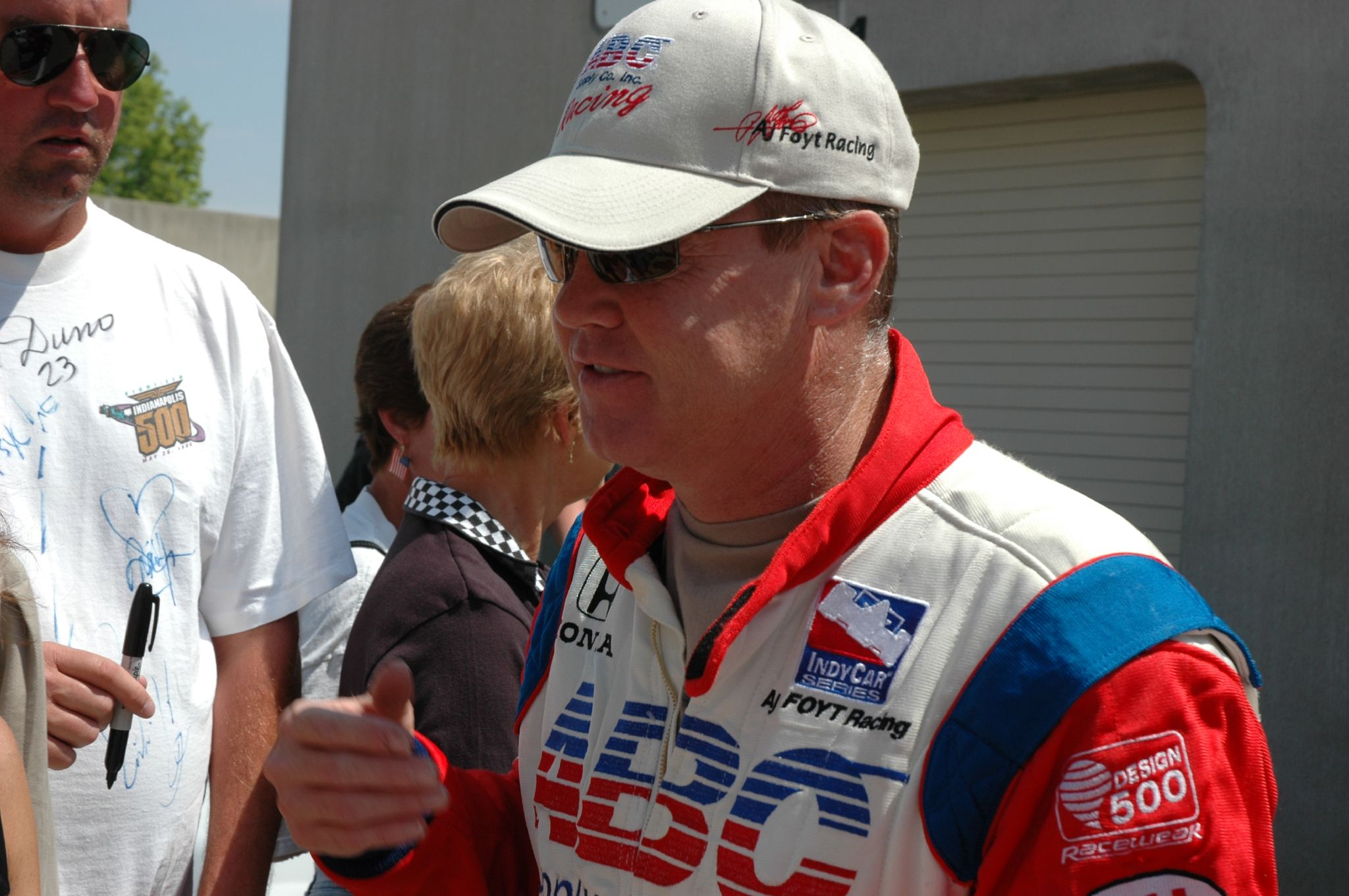
Al Unser Jr. won the 2001 race.

- 2001: The race switched to the Indy Racing League for 2001, and the distance was changed to 200 laps (250 miles). Al Unser Jr. battled Sam Hornish Jr. over most of the race, and the win came down to fuel mileage. Donnie Beechler crashed on lap 188, bringing out a caution, and Hornish pitted for fuel. Unser stayed out and picked up the lead. When the green came back out, he managed to stretch his fuel to the finish and won his 33rd career Indy car race. Mark Dismore also gambled on fuel, earning him a second place. Hornish settled for third.
- 2002: Penske teammates Gil de Ferran and Hélio Castroneves combined to lead 166 of the 200 laps, running 1-2 much of the day. With 17 laps to go, Castroneves was leading and trying to hold off de Ferran as the two drivers were making their way through slower traffic. Castroneves became held up by the lapped car of Airton Daré, allowing de Ferran to jump past on the outside and grab the lead - and ultimately the victory. Alex Barron was the only other driver who challenged up front. After leading 29 laps, Barron drifted high in turn one during a restart on lap 152, dropping him from 1st to 5th. Barron managed to recover and finished third.
- 2003: Hélio Castroneves snapped a 21-race winless streak (dating back to the 2002 Indy 500) and climbed the catchfence to celebrate. The race, however, was marred by a pit lane incident that injured a crew member. Scott Dixon was leading the race when his gearbox failed on lap 159. Castroneves took over the lead, and despite losing his dashboard electronics, managed to hold off Tony Kanaan for the victory. Entering the pit area on lap 40, Bryan Herta touched wheels with Scott Dixon, causing Herta's car to become slightly airborne, but not damaged. Moments later as he was leaving the pits, Herta made contact again, this time with Buddy Lazier. Herta's car was sent sliding into the pit of Al Unser Jr. Left-rear tire changer Anton Julian was struck by Herta's car, knocking him unconscious. Julian suffered a cut on his head, a concussion, and a knee injury. This would be the final IndyCar race at Gateway for more than a decade. Facing declining attendance, the race was dropped from the schedule for 2004.

=== IndyCar Series ===
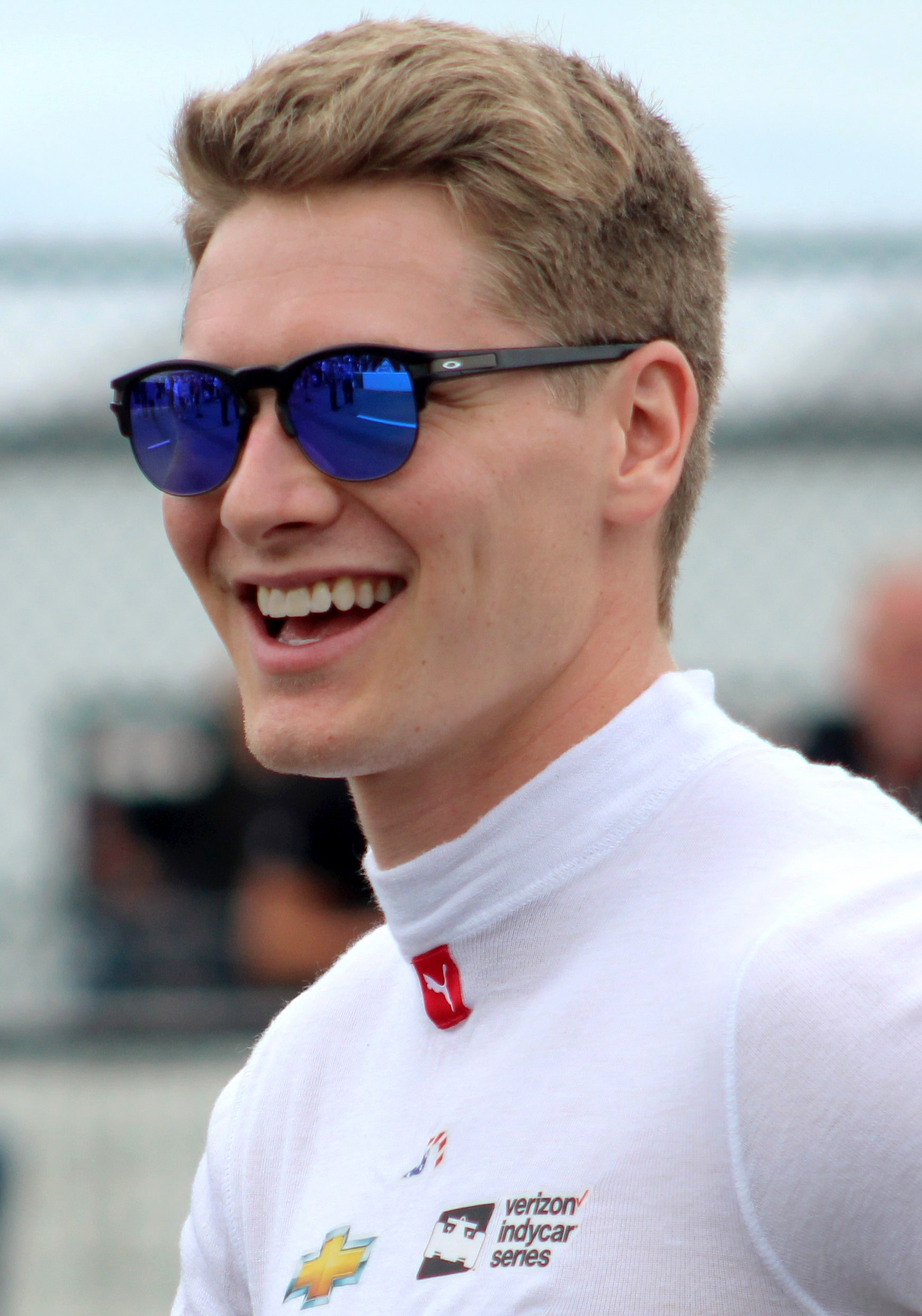
Josef Newgarden became the first two-time winner at Gateway (2017, 2020).

- 2017: After a 14-year absence, the IndyCar Series returned to Gateway for a night race in 2017 under its new owner, former Indy Lights driver Curtis Francois. In front of a packed front stretch grandstand, the race started under caution when Tony Kanaan lost control of his car before the green flag and backed into the turn 2 wall. The race stayed under yellow after briefly going green on lap 5, when Will Power slid into the wall after being passed for the lead, taking out Ed Carpenter and Takuma Sato in the process. After the race finally restarted on lap 17, the three remaining Team Penske drivers led most of evening, with Helio Castroneves, Simon Pagenaud, and Josef Newgarden combining to lead 235 out of the 248 laps. Newgarden led 170 laps on his own, but was running in second place to teammate Pagenaud due to the latter's quicker yellow-flag pit stop on lap 206. At the resumption of green flag racing on lap 211, the top four was made of championship contenders, with Pagenaud leading Newgarden, Scott Dixon, and Castroneves. On lap 218, Newgarden made a bonzai pass on his teammate in turn 1, bumping Pagenaud into the high groove in the process. Dixon pounced on the back straightaway, moving Pagenaud to third, and they held that order all the way to the checkered flag, with Castroneves fourth and A.J. Foyt Racing's Conor Daly a season-best fifth and career-best on an oval. It was Newgarden's third win in the past four races, and his fourth win of the year overall. Pagenaud had some choice words about his teammate's race-winning maneuver, saying, "he doesn't have any respect for me and he's lucky it was me or we'd have both been in the wall," while team owner Roger Penske applauded the move.
- 2018: Scott Dixon started on the pole position after qualifying was canceled due to rain. Dixon led a total of 145 laps, but late in the race Will Power charged to the front and took the lead on lap 150 (of 248). Power pulled out to a 7-second advantage before he ducked into the pits for a splash-and-go pit stop with 18 laps to go. As other drivers, including Dixon, cycled through their final stops, Power regained the lead with 8 laps to go. Alexander Rossi attempted to go the distance on only two stops, and shuffled up to second. Power held on to win, with Rossi nursing his car home for second place. Dixon settled for third.
- 2019: At the start, Takuma Sato was shuffled from 5th to the back of the field after near-contact with Ryan Hunter-Reay and other cars. Sato was then off-sequence on his pit stops, while Santino Ferrucci went on to lead 97 of the first 187 laps. During a sequence of green flag pit stops on lap 192, Sébastien Bourdais spun out in turn four bringing out a caution. Sato, Ed Carpenter, Tony Kanaan, and Josef Newgarden had not yet pitted, and the other leaders were trapped a lap down. Sato battled Carpenter over the final laps, with Sato holding him off for the win by 0.0399 seconds. On the final lap, points leader Newgarden was battling Ferrucci for position when he lost control and spun out of turn four. Newgarden limped over the finish line, dropping from 4th to 7th, losing valuable championship points in the process. Sato's win came just one week after being blamed for a serious crash at Pocono.
- 2020 (Race 1): Due to the COVID-19 pandemic, the race was changed from a 500 km event under the lights to twin 250-mile races. The first race was held on Saturday afternoon with Will Power starting on the pole position. At the start, a controversial crash involved six cars. Alex Palou jumped out of line, and was followed by Simon Pagenaud. The cars checked up and Oliver Askew ran into the back of Pagenaud, who then turned into Alexander Rossi. Also caught up in the incident were Marco Andretti, Ed Carpenter, and Zach Veach. When the race went green on lap 13, Will Power took the lead and led until the first round of pit stops on lap 62. Patricio O'Ward then took the lead and dominated over the next 94 laps. The final round of pit stops came around lap 163. Second place Scott Dixon managed to beat O'Ward out of the pits, and emerged as the leader. However, Takuma Sato, executing an "overcut" strategy, stayed out and pitted 12 laps later. During his pit stop on lap 175, trouble with one of the wheels made for a slower stop. Sato, on fresher tires, quickly began chasing down the leaders. He executed a daring pass on the outside of turn one to take second from O'Ward, then set his sights on Dixon. Sato was attempting to become the first driver since 2000 to win the Indianapolis 500, then win again the following week. Sato closed within 0.3 seconds, but Dixon managed to hold off the challenge. Scott Dixon won his milestone 50th career Indy car race, reversing the finishing order from the Indy 500 the weekend before (Sato 1st, Dixon 2nd). Dixon also became the 11th different winner at Gateway in eleven total races.
- 2020 (Race 2): The second race of the doubleheader was held Sunday afternoon, as a doubleheader with the 2020 NASCAR Gander RV & Outdoors Truck Series serving as the preliminary race. Takuma Sato started from the pole position. Several different teams employed different strategies, some choosing to "undercut" (pit early) and some choosing to "overcut" (pit later), in order to gain track position. After the final round of pit stops, the race came down to Josef Newgarden and Patricio O'Ward. With Will Power leading, Newgarden and O'Ward made their final pit stops on lap 153. They exited the pits together, and raced side by side in the warm-up lane. With O'Ward on the outside, Newgarden came out just ahead. Power was held up on his in-lap by the slower car of Ed Carpenter, which resulted in Newgarden and O'Ward passing him out on the track. Running nose-to-tail over the final 40 laps, Newgarden held off O'Ward. The caution came out with four laps to go when Takuma Sato brushed the wall in turn two. The race finished under yellow with Newgarden becoming the first repeat winner at Gateway.
- 2021: Gateway was scheduled as the final oval race of the 2021 IndyCar Series and the only short oval on the schedule with the race being lengthened from 500km to 325 miles (260 laps) in order to change pit strategies. The race had several notable storylines, the most prominent being the championship duel between Alex Palou and Pato O'Ward. Palou entered the race with the points lead in the championship but had to take an eleven position grid penalty as the result of an unscheduled engine change in the previous race, forcing him to start that the back of the grid. Will Power meanwhile qualified for his first pole position of the season. The race saw several accidents, with Graham Rahal and Ed Jones being taken out on the second lap of the race while Scott Dixon, Rinus Veekay, and Alex Palou were collected in a three car incident. Josef Newgarden took the lead upon the first round of pitstops and was challenged for most of the night by Alexander Rossi and Colton Herta, with Herta gaining the lead for several laps before a driveshaft on his car blew and retired him from the race. Rossi attempted to run a fuel saving strategy with a late push to attack Newgarden that backfired and resulted in him crashing in the final stint of the race. Pato O'Ward moved up to second and appeared to challenge Newgarden for the win for a third this season and the third time at Gateway but the Penske driver pulled away to win comfortably for the second time in 2021. With his second-place finish and Palou's retirement O'Ward took a ten-point lead in the championship. Will Power rounded out the podium in third place.
- 2022: Will Power would qualify on pole for his sixty-seventh career pole position, tying Mario Andretti for the most poles in IndyCar history. The race was largely a processional affair in the first half, with little passing until Scott McLaughlin took the lead after the first pit stop sequence. Rain then halted the race for an hour, washing the track of all rubber but cooling the track down. When racing resumed McLaughlin took the lead before ultimately being passed by Josef Newgarden. The biggest story of the race was rookie David Malukas of Dale Coyne Racing With HMD Motorsports, who after a carefully timed pitstop, emerged out on the track with fresher rubber than Newgarden and McLaughlin. Malukas mounted a furious charge through the field, passing McLaughlin and running nose to tail with Newgarden up until the last lap of the race. Newgarden ultimately prevailed for his fifth win of the season while Malukas took second for his first IndyCar podium. Scott McLaughlin finished third.
- 2023: Gateway would experience two major changes as part of the 2023 schedule. The first was a move from a Saturday night race to a Sunday afternoon race, which allowed the race to be nationally televised. The second was the reintroduction of alternate oval tires, which were last used during the CART era of IndyCar racing, with a Gateway specific softer compound tire being mandated to be run for at least one stint during the race. Scott McLaughlin qualified on pole, but due to an unscheduled engine change he suffered a nine position grid penalty and Josef Newgarden started first on the grid. Newgarden and Pato O'Ward ran away from the field early in the race before Newgarden surrendered the lead to Scott Dixon in a series of yellow flag pit stops around lap 100. Dixon would lead the remainder of the race and take victory by running one fewer stop than the rest of the field. Newgarden crashed out of the race, preventing him from becoming the first IndyCar driver to win every oval event in a single season. Pato O'Ward finished second while David Malukas took third.

== Past winners ==
Season	Date	Winning Driver	Team	Chassis	Engine	Race Distance		Race Time	Average Speed (mph)	Report
Season	Date	Winning Driver	Team	Chassis	Engine	Laps	Miles (km)	Race Time	Average Speed (mph)	Report
CART World Series
1997	May 24	(Canada) Paul Tracy	Penske Racing	Penske	Mercedes-Benz	236	299.72 (482.249)*	2:37:54	113.884	Report
1998	May 23	(Italy) Alex Zanardi	Chip Ganassi Racing	Reynard	Honda	236	299.72 (482.249)*	2:23:02	125.725	Report
1999	May 29	(United States) Michael Andretti	Newman/Haas Racing	Swift	Ford-Cosworth	236	299.72 (482.249)*	2:25:35	123.513	Report
2000	September 17	(Colombia) Juan Pablo Montoya	Chip Ganassi Racing (2)	Lola	Toyota	236	299.72 (482.249)*	1:55:38	155.519	Report
IndyCar Series
2001	August 26	(United States) Al Unser Jr.	Galles Racing	G-Force	Oldsmobile	200	250 (402.336)	1:49:59	133.379	Report
2002	August 25	(Brazil) Gil de Ferran	Penske Racing (2)	Dallara	Chevrolet	200	250 (402.336)	1:44:23	143.711	Report
2003	August 10	(Brazil) Hélio Castroneves	Penske Racing (3)	Dallara	Toyota	200	250 (402.336)	1:50:53	135.286	Report
2004 – 2016	Not held									
2017	August 26	(United States) Josef Newgarden	Team Penske (4)	Dallara	Chevrolet	248	310 (498.897)	2:13:22	139.465	Report
2018	August 25	(Australia) Will Power	Team Penske (5)	Dallara	Chevrolet	248	310 (498.897)	1:59:30	155.644	Report
2019	August 24	(Japan) Takuma Sato	Rahal Letterman Lanigan Racing	Dallara	Honda	248	310 (498.897)	2:15:53	136.874	Report
2020	August 29	(New Zealand) Scott Dixon	Chip Ganassi Racing (3)	Dallara	Honda	200	250 (402.336)	1:44:30	143.522	Report
2020	August 30	(United States) Josef Newgarden (2)	Team Penske (6)	Dallara	Chevrolet	200	250 (402.336)	1:32:15	162.594	Report
2021	August 21	(United States) Josef Newgarden (3)	Team Penske (7)	Dallara	Chevrolet	260	325 (522.6)	2:24:10	135.245	Report
2022	August 20	(United States) Josef Newgarden (4)	Team Penske (8)	Dallara	Chevrolet	260	325 (522.6)	2:10:40	149.231	Report
2023	August 27	(New Zealand) Scott Dixon (2)	Chip Ganassi Racing (4)	Dallara	Honda	260	325 (522.6)	2:10:09	149.819	Report
2024	August 17	(United States) Josef Newgarden (5)	Team Penske (9)	Dallara	Chevrolet	260	325 (522.6)	2:22:28	136.870	Report
2025	June 15	(United States) Kyle Kirkwood	Andretti Global	Dallara	Honda	260	325 (522.6)	2:23:26	135.939	Report
2026	June 7	(United States) Josef Newgarden (6)	Team Penske (10)	Dallara	Chevrolet	260	325 (522.6)	2:25:26	134.070	Report

* - no time trials held

- CART measured the track length to 1.27 miles (2.04 km).

=== Support race winners ===
Indy Pro Series/Indy Lights/Indy NXT
Season	Date	Winning driver
CART Indy Lights
1997	May 24	(Canada) Lee Bentham
1998	May 23	(Japan) Shigeaki Hattori
1999	Not held	
2000	September 17	(United States) Townsend Bell
IRL Indy Pro Series
2001	August 26	(United Kingdom) Dan Wheldon
2002	August 25	(United States) Ryan Hampton
2003	August 9	(United States) Jeff Simmons
2004 – 2016	Not held	
IndyCar Indy Lights
2017	August 26	(Uruguay) Santiago Urrutia
2018	August 25	(United States) Ryan Norman
2019	August 24	(United States) Oliver Askew
2020	Season cancelled due to the COVID-19 pandemic.	
2021	August 20	(United States) David Malukas
2021	August 21	(United States) David Malukas
2022	August 20	(Australia) Matthew Brabham
Indy NXT
2023	Not Held	
2024	August 17	(United Kingdom) Louis Foster
2025	June 15	(Australia) Lochie Hughes
2026	June 7	(United States) Myles Rowe

USAC Silver Crown Champ Car Series
Season	Date	Winning driver
1997	September 14	(United States) Pat Abold
1998	October 17	(United States) J. J. Yeley
1999	July 30	(United States) Ryan Newman
2000	May 7	(United States) Tracy Hines
2001	August 25	(United States) Dave Steele
2002 – 2012	Not held	
2013	June 1	(United States) Bobby Santos III
2014	June 14	(United States) Bobby Santos III
2015	Not held	
2016	June 25	(United States) Tanner Swanson
2017 – 2021	Not held	
2022	August 19	(United States) Kody Swanson
2023	August 27	(United States) Davey Hamilton, Jr.
2024	August 16	(United States) Dakoda Armstrong
2025	June 14	(United States) Kody Swanson
2026	June 7	(United States) CJ Leary

Pro Mazda Championship
Season	Date	Winning driver
2017	August 26	(Brazil) Victor Franzoni
2018	August 25	(Netherlands) Rinus VeeKay
Indy Pro 2000 Championship
2019	August 24	(United States) Kyle Kirkwood
2020	August 29	(Canada) Devlin DeFrancesco
2021	August 21	(United States) Braden Eves
2022	August 20	(Mexico) Salvador de Alba Jr.

Atlantic Championship
Season	Date	Winning driver
1998	May 23	(United States) Memo Gidley
1999	May 28	(United States) Anthony Lazzaro
2000	September 17	(United States) Case Montgomery

ARCA Menards Series East & ARCA Menards Series West
Season	Date	Winning driver
2018 W& E	August 24	(United States) Derek Kraus
2019 W& E	August 24	(United States) Spencer Davis
ARCA Menards Series
2020	August 29	(United States) Ty Gibbs

NASCAR AutoZone Elite Division, Southeast Series
Season	Date	Winning driver
1999	May 28	(United States) Steven Howard
NASCAR Gander RV & Outdoors Truck Series
2020	August 30	(United States) Sheldon Creed

Preceded by Chevrolet Detroit Grand Prix	IndyCar Series; Bommarito Automotive Group 500	Succeeded by Grand Prix of Road America
