= IndyCar Series at Auto Club Speedway =

IndyCar Series race held in Fontana, California

Verizon IndyCar Series
- Venue: Auto Club Speedway (1997–2005, 2012–2015)
- Corporate sponsor: Marlboro (1997–2001); Toyota (1998–2005); Yamaha (2002); King Taco (2003); Lucas Oil (2012–2015)
- First race: 1997
- First ICS race: 2002
- Last race: 2015
- Distance: 500 mi (800 km) – 1997–2002 CART, 2012–2015 IRL; 400 mi (640 km) – 2002–2005, IRL
- Laps: 200 (2002–2005); 250 (1997–2003, 2012–2015)
- Previous names: Marlboro 500 Presented by Toyota (1997, 1999–2001); Yamaha Indy 400 (2002 IRL); The 500 presented by Toyota (1998 & 2002 CART); King Taco 500 (2003 CART); Toyota Indy 400 (2003–2005); MAVTV 500 (2012–2015)
- Most wins (driver): Sam Hornish Jr. (2); Adrian Fernández (2)
- Most wins (team): Chip Ganassi Racing (2); Newman-Haas Racing (2); Rahal Letterman Lanigan Racing (2); Panther Racing (2)
- Most wins (manufacturer): Chassis: Dallara (7); Engine: Chevrolet (5)

American open-wheel car races had been hosted at Auto Club Speedway in Fontana, California since its inauguration in 1997 until 2015 (except from 2006 to 2011), under both CART/Champ Car and modern-day IndyCar Series sanctioning, representing a continuous lineage of American open-wheel oval racing in the Southern California-area that dates back to 1970.

For many years in the late 1990s and early 2000s, the race served as the season finale for the CART series. From 2012 to 2014, when it was sponsored by MAVTV, it served as the finale for the IndyCar Series.

In 2015, the race was moved to June. Despite several journalists calling the 2015 edition one of the best IndyCar races, the race did not return on the schedule for 2016, ending the lineage of Southern California open-wheel oval races.

== History ==
=== CART ===
CART renewed the 500-mile oval race in 1997 at the newly built California Speedway in Fontana, California. The new track was built just 4 miles (6.4 km) from the previous Ontario Motor Speedway where the California 500 was held between 1970 and 1980. Indy car races were also held at nearby Riverside, but only from 1967 to 1969 (prior to the opening of Ontario) and again from 1981 to 1983 (after Ontario closed).

The Fontana race was held under the moniker Marlboro 500, and served as the CART season finale. This event was held through 2002. The race became known for closed-course record speeds, and fast and competitive racing, owing much to the track's width.

The 1999 race is considered a tragic day in the history of CART, after the fatal crash of Greg Moore. The 2003 event was cancelled due to the Old Fire.

Along with the popular Long Beach Grand Prix, the Southern California area featured two major open wheel CART races annually for a time.

=== Indy Racing League / IndyCar ===
In 2002, the IRL IndyCar Series added a 400-mile race to the facility. Fontana became the first facility to host races from both rival open wheel series (CART and IRL), although the race distance was different (500 vs 400 miles). The Toyota Indy 400 was held through 2005. However, crowds dwindled, and the event was removed from the calendar.

The now-unified IndyCar Series returned to Fontana for the 2012 season with a 500-mile fall night race under the lights. The race served as the season finale from 2012 to 2014. For 2015, the race was moved to June.

=== Closed-course speed records ===
Two world closed course speed records were established in qualifying for the CART event. Maurício Gugelmin, driving a Reynard/Mercedes established a one-lap time of 30.316 seconds (average speed of 240.942 miles per hour (387.759 km/h) in 1997. At the time, CART officials recognized the track measurement as 2.029 miles (3.265 km). Gugelimin had furthermore turned an unofficial lap of 242.333 miles per hour (389.997 km/h) during the morning practice.

On October 28, 2000, Gil de Ferran of Penske Racing topped Gugelmin's time driving a Reynard/Honda. The lap time by de Ferran was 30.255 seconds at an average speed of 241.428 miles per hour (388.541 km/h). Using the more common track measurement of 2.0 miles, de Ferran's lap translated into an average speed of 237.977 miles per hour (382.987 km/h).

- In 2002, the 500-mile CART series race averaged 197.995 mph, and stood as the fastest 500-mile race in history (either open wheel cars or stock cars) for a dozen years. The record stood until the 2014 Pocono 500.
- The 2003 IRL/IndyCar race was the fastest circuit race ever in motorsport history, with an average speed of 207.151 mph (333.306 km/h) over 400 miles (643.737 km).

== Race results ==
Season	Date	Driver	Team	Chassis	Engine	Race Distance		Race Time	Average Speed (mph)	Report	Ref
Season	Date	Driver	Team	Chassis	Engine	Laps	Miles (km)	Race Time	Average Speed (mph)	Report	Ref
PPG CART World Series/FedEx Championship
1997	September 28	(United Kingdom) Mark Blundell	PacWest Racing	Reynard	Mercedes-Benz	250	500 (804.672)	3:02:42	166.575	Report	
1998	November 1	(United States) Jimmy Vasser	Chip Ganassi Racing	Reynard	Honda	250	500 (804.672)	3:17:54	153.785	Report	
1999	October 31	(Mexico) Adrián Fernández	Patrick Racing	Reynard	Ford-Cosworth	250	500 (804.672)	2:57:17	171.666	Report	
2000	October 29/30*	(Brazil) Christian Fittipaldi	Newman-Haas Racing	Lola	Ford-Cosworth	250	500 (804.672)	3:38:04	139.563	Report	
2001	November 4	(Brazil) Cristiano da Matta	Newman-Haas Racing	Lola	Toyota	220*	440 (708.111)	2:59:39	149.073	Report	
2002	November 3	(United States) Jimmy Vasser	Team Rahal	Lola	Ford-Cosworth	250	500 (804.672)	2:33:42	197.995	Report	
2003	November 9	Cancelled due to wildfires in the San Bernardino Mountains.								Report	
Indy Racing League/Verizon IndyCar Series
2002	March 24	(United States) Sam Hornish Jr.	Panther Racing	Dallara	Chevrolet	200	400 (643.737)	2:13:49	179.345	Report	
2003	September 21	(United States) Sam Hornish Jr.	Panther Racing	Dallara	Chevrolet	200	400 (643.737)	1:55:51	207.151	Report	
2004	October 3	(Mexico) Adrian Fernández	Aguri-Fernández Racing	G-Force	Honda	200	400 (643.737)	2:14:13	178.826	Report	
2005	October 16	(United Kingdom) Dario Franchitti	Andretti Green Racing	Dallara	Honda	200	400 (643.737)	2:22:23	168.567	Report	
2006 – 2011	Not held										
2012	September 15	(United States) Ed Carpenter	Ed Carpenter Racing	Dallara	Chevrolet	250	500 (804.672)	2:57:34	168.939	Report	
2013	October 19	(Australia) Will Power	Penske Racing	Dallara	Chevrolet	250	500 (804.672)	3:13:43	154.867	Report	
2014	August 30	(Brazil) Tony Kanaan	Chip Ganassi Racing	Dallara	Chevrolet	250	500 (804.672)	2:32:58	196.111	Report	
2015	June 27	(United States) Graham Rahal	Rahal Letterman Lanigan Racing	Dallara	Honda	250	500 (804.672)	2:57:41	168.846	Report	

- 2000: Race started on Sunday but finished on Monday due to rain.
- 2001: Race started late because of rain and was shortened because of darkness.

=== Firestone Indy Lights ===
Season	Date	Driver	Chassis	Engine	Race Distance		Race Time	Average Speed (mph)	Ref
Season	Date	Driver	Chassis	Engine	Laps	Miles (km)	Race Time	Average Speed (mph)	Ref
Auto Club Speedway
1997	September 27	(United States) Clint Mears	Lola	Buick	50	100 (160.934)	0:52:16	116.467	
1998	October 31	(United States) Mark Hotchkis	Lola	Buick	50	100 (160.934)	0:39:41	153.395	
1999	October 30	(United Kingdom) Jonny Kane	Lola	Buick	50	100 (160.934)	0:46:52	129.902	
2000	October 29	(New Zealand) Scott Dixon	Lola	Buick	50	100 (160.934)	0:33:08	183.672	
2001	November 4	(United States) Townsend Bell	Lola	Buick	44*	88 (141.622)	0:29:23	182.334	
2002	Not held								
2003	September 20	(United Kingdom) Mark Taylor	Dallara	Infiniti	50	100 (160.934)	0:41:14	145.536	
2004	October 2	(United States) James Chesson	Dallara	Infiniti	50	100 (160.934)	0:40:51	146.894	
2005	October 16	(New Zealand) Wade Cunningham	Dallara	Infiniti	50	100 (160.934)	0:43:07	139.17	
2006 – 2011	Not held								
2012	September 15	(Colombia) Carlos Muñoz	Dallara	Infiniti	50	100 (160.934)	0:37:38	159.41	
2013	October 19	(Colombia) Carlos Muñoz	Dallara	Infiniti	50	100 (160.934)	0:32:10	186.552	

- 2001: Race shortened due to time limit.
