= United States Formula Three Championship =

Formula Three championship contested in the United States and Canada 2000–2001

U.S. Formula 3 Championship
- Category: Formula Three
- Country: United States, Canada
- Inaugural season: 2000
- Folded: 2001
- Constructors: Dallara, Ralt
- Engine suppliers: Volkswagen
- Tyre suppliers: Avon
- Last Drivers' champion: (Brazil) Luciano Gomide
- Last Teams' champion: (Italy) EuroInternational

The United States Formula Three Championship was a short-lived Formula Three championship contested in the United States and Canada. Sanctioned by the Sports Car Club of America, the series lasted for two seasons, 2000 and 2001. All teams used Volkswagen engines tuned by Bertils Racing Engines.

The series was plagued by low car counts; no more than 6 cars contested races in the inaugural season. In 2001, fields were bolstered by Formula Ford, Formula Continental, and even Sports 2000 and historic Formula 5000 cars, as no race had more than 3 Formula Three cars on the grid. 14 of the series' 19 races were won by Brazilian driver Luciano Gomide. A 2002 season was planned with 13 races, including a doubleheader supporting the 2002 United States Grand Prix, but was ultimately cancelled.

== 2000 season ==
The 2000 season was contested over 11 races at 6 race meetings. The schedule initially included two oval races at Indianapolis Raceway Park and Irwindale Speedway, but these were later cancelled. The round at San Diego was a joint race with the Mexican Formula Three Championship, although the Mexican series ran with older, slower machinery. Stuart Crow won the championship by 5 points over Luciano Gomide. Gomide joined the series after the first 4 rounds, and won pole and the race at the final 7 events on the calendar.

=== Schedule and results ===
Rnd	Date	Track	Location	Pole position	Fastest race lap	Race winner	Winning team
1	June 24	Hallett Motor Racing Circuit	(United States) Hallett, Oklahoma	(United States) Stuart Crow	(United States) Stuart Crow	(United States) Adam Andretti	Duesenberg Racing
2	June 25	Hallett Motor Racing Circuit	(United States) Hallett, Oklahoma	(United States) Adam Andretti	(United States) Stuart Crow	(United States) Stuart Crow	Dave McMillan Racing
3	July 7	Memphis Motorsports Park	(United States) Millington, Tennessee	(United States) Stuart Crow	(United States) Stuart Crow	(United States) Stuart Crow	Dave McMillan Racing
4	July 8	Memphis Motorsports Park	(United States) Millington, Tennessee	(United States) Stuart Crow	(United States) Stuart Crow	(United States) Stuart Crow	Dave McMillan Racing
5	August 19	Circuit Ste-Croix	(Canada) Sainte-Croix, Quebec	(Brazil) Luciano Gomide	(Brazil) Luciano Gomide	(Brazil) Luciano Gomide	EuroInternational
6	August 20	Circuit Ste-Croix	(Canada) Sainte-Croix, Quebec	(Brazil) Luciano Gomide	(Brazil) Luciano Gomide	(Brazil) Luciano Gomide	EuroInternational
7	August 27	Watkins Glen International	(United States) Watkins Glen, New York	(Brazil) Luciano Gomide	(Brazil) Luciano Gomide	(Brazil) Luciano Gomide	EuroInternational
—	September 22	Indianapolis Raceway Park	(United States) Clermont, Indiana	Race cancelled			
8	October 14	Sears Point Raceway	(United States) Sonoma, California	(Brazil) Luciano Gomide	(Brazil) Luciano Gomide	(Brazil) Luciano Gomide	EuroInternational
9	October 15	Sears Point Raceway	(United States) Sonoma, California	(Brazil) Luciano Gomide	(Brazil) Luciano Gomide	(Brazil) Luciano Gomide	EuroInternational
—	October 28	Irwindale Speedway	(United States) Irwindale, California	Race cancelled			
10	November 4	Streets of San Diego	(United States) San Diego, California	(Brazil) Luciano Gomide	(Brazil) Luciano Gomide	(Brazil) Luciano Gomide	EuroInternational
11	November 5	Streets of San Diego	(United States) San Diego, California	(Brazil) Luciano Gomide	(Brazil) Luciano Gomide	(Brazil) Luciano Gomide	EuroInternational

=== Points standings ===
Pos	1	2	3	4	5	6	7	8	9	10
Points	20	15	12	10	8	6	4	3	2	1

One bonus point was also awarded to the driver completing the fastest lap during the race.

Pos	Driver	Team	Chassis	HAL		MEM		STC		WGL	SPT		SDG		Pts
1	(United States) Stuart Crow	Dave McMillan Racing	Ralt F3/2000	5	1	1	1	3	5	2	3	5	2	4	152
2	(Brazil) Luciano Gomide	EuroInternational	Dallara F399					1	1	1	1	1	1	1	147
3	(United States) Adam Andretti	Duesenberg Racing	Dallara F399	1	2	3	3	4	3	3	2	2	6	DNS	129
4	(United States) George Frazier	EuroInternational	Dallara F399	3	4	5	2	2	2	4	5	3	4	2	122
5	(United States) Skip Weld	Weldsports	Dallara F399	2	5	4	4	5	4	5	4	DNS	5	3	99
6	(United States) Paul Jenkins	Pilette Speed Tradition	Dallara F399	4	3					DNS	6	4			38
7	(Sweden) Robert Skollenskog	Pilette Speed Tradition	Dallara F399			2	5								15
8	(Brazil) Marcelo Gaffoglio	Pilette Speed Tradition	Dallara F399										3	DNS	12
9	(United States) David Rosenblum	Weldsports	Dallara F399					6	6						6

== 2001 season ==
An initial 13-race calendar was announced for the 2001 season, however after losing their financial backing, the series was re-arranged to a 15-race schedule with the addition of more rounds in Canada. With low car counts eminent, the series considered using Formula Super Vee cars as a "Class B", but instead Formula Ford and Formula Continental cars filled out fields. No more than three Formula 3 cars participated in any race; five of the nine races were contested only by the EuroInternational teammates Luciano Gomide and John C. Antonio. Gomide won all but one race and took the championship title.

=== Initial schedule ===
Date	Track
April 22	(United States) Phoenix International Raceway, Avondale, Arizona
May 20	(Canada) Mosport Park, Bowmanville, Ontario
June 10	(United States) Mid-Ohio Sports Car Course, Lexington, Ohio
June 30/July 1	(Canada) Quebec City Street Course, Quebec City, Quebec
July 8	TBA
September 23	TBA
October 27/28	(United States) Laguna Seca Raceway, Monterey, California
November 3/4	(United States) Las Vegas Motor Speedway, Las Vegas, Nevada
November	(United States) Streets of San Diego, San Diego, California

=== Schedule and results ===
Rnd	Date	Track	Location	Pole position	Race winner	Winning team
1	May 20	Mosport Park	(Canada) Bowmanville, Ontario	(Brazil) Luciano Gomide	(Brazil) Luciano Gomide	EuroInternational
2	June 24	Mosport Park	(Canada) Bowmanville, Ontario	(Brazil) Luciano Gomide	(Brazil) Luciano Gomide	EuroInternational
3	July 29	Watkins Glen International	(United States) Watkins Glen, New York	(Brazil) Luciano Gomide	(Brazil) Luciano Gomide	EuroInternational
—	August 5	Circuit Trois-Rivières	(Canada) Trois-Rivières, Quebec	Race cancelled		
4	August 19	Mosport Park	(Canada) Bowmanville, Ontario	(Brazil) Luciano Gomide	(Brazil) Luciano Gomide	EuroInternational
—	September 1	Circuit Ste-Croix	(Canada) Sainte-Croix, Quebec	Race cancelled		
—	September 2	Circuit Ste-Croix	(Canada) Sainte-Croix, Quebec	Race cancelled		
5	September 1	Mosport Park	(Canada) Bowmanville, Ontario	(United States) John C. Antonio	Race abandoned	
6	September 2	Mosport Park	(Canada) Bowmanville, Ontario	?	(Brazil) Luciano Gomide	EuroInternational
—	September 16	Pocono Raceway	(United States) Long Pond, Pennsylvania	Race cancelled due to the September 11 attacks		
7	September 22	Circuit Mont-Tremblant	(Canada) Mont-Tremblant, Quebec	(Brazil) Luciano Gomide	(Brazil) Luciano Gomide	EuroInternational
8	September 23	Circuit Mont-Tremblant	(Canada) Mont-Tremblant, Quebec	(United States) John C. Antonio	(Brazil) Luciano Gomide	EuroInternational
9	October 21	Watkins Glen International	(United States) Watkins Glen, New York	(United States) John C. Antonio	(United States) John C. Antonio	EuroInternational
—	October 27	Sears Point Raceway	(United States) Sonoma, California	Race cancelled		
—	October 28	Sears Point Raceway	(United States) Sonoma, California	Race cancelled		
—	November 3	Las Vegas Motor Speedway	(United States) Las Vegas, Nevada	Race cancelled		
—	November 4	Las Vegas Motor Speedway	(United States) Las Vegas, Nevada	Race cancelled		

=== Points standings ===
Pos	1	2	3	4	5	6
Points	10	6	4	3	2	1

Pos	Driver	Team	Chassis	MOS	MOS	WGL	MOS	MOS		MTB		WGL	Pts
1	(Brazil) Luciano Gomide	EuroInternational	Dallara F399	1	1	1	1	NC	1	1	1	8	70
2	(United States) John C. Antonio	EuroInternational	Dallara F399	2	2	2	DNS	NC	2	2	2	1	46
3	(United States) Paul Dana	Bertils Racing Engines	Dallara F399				2						6
4=	(United States) B. J. Zacharias	Olsson Engineering	Dallara F399		3								4
4=	(Canada) Jacek Mucha	Orion	Ralt F3/2000					NC	3				4

== See also ==
- Formula Three
- Formula Lites
- F3 Americas Championship
