= Sylvain Lacombe =

Canadian racing driver

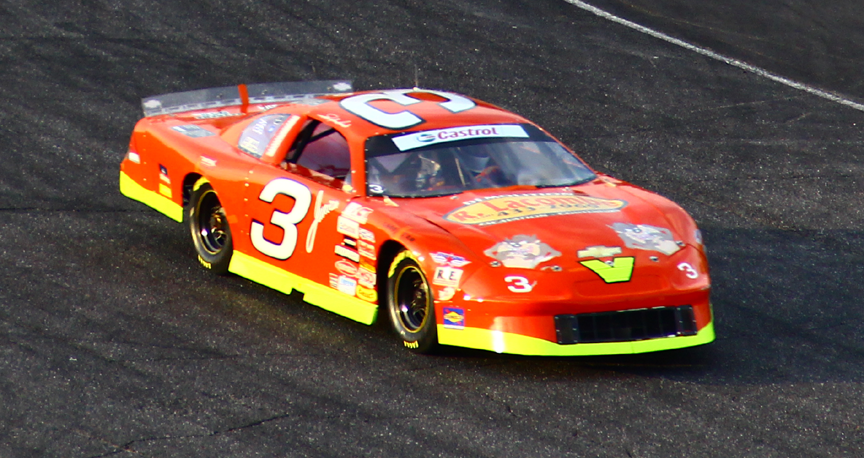
- Lacombe at Circuit Riverside Speedway Ste-Croix in 2011
- Nationality: (Canada) Canadian
- Born: Quebec, Canada

Série ACT career
- Debut season: 1980's
- Car number: 3

Sylvain Lacombe is a Canadian racing driver. He competes in the Quebec's ACT Series.

Champion of the former Série nationale Castrol LMS Quebec in 2005. He was vice-champion of the Quebec's ACT Series in 2007 and of the Série Supreme ADL Tobacco in 2000.

He won 14 races in Quebec's ACT Series and Série nationale Castrol LMS Quebec, and one in the US-based ACT Tour.

Six times winner of the St-Eustache 300 race at Autodrome St-Eustache in 1995, 2002, 2005, 2006, 2007 et 2008. Autodrome Montmagny track champion in 2001.

His brother, Martin, is also a stock car driver.
