= 1996 Atlantic Championship =

1996 Toyota Atlantic Championship season
- Player's Toyota Atlantic Championship

Season
- Races: 12
- Start date: March 3rd
- End date: September 7th

Awards
- Drivers' champion: (Canada) Patrick Carpentier

The 1996 Toyota Atlantic Championship season was the 23rd season of the formula race car Atlantic Championship. It was contested over 12 races between March 3 and September 7, 1995. The Player's Toyota Atlantic Championship Drivers' Champion was Patrick Carpentier. All teams had to utilize Toyota engines. In C2-class 23 different drivers competed, but none of them for the whole season.

== Calendar ==
Race No	Track	St/Prov	Date	Laps	Distance	Time	Speed	Winner	Pole position	Most leading laps	Fastest race lap
1	Homestead	Florida	March 3, 1996	50	2.25302=112.651 km	0'40:51.71	165.413 km/h	Tony Ave	Lee Bentham	Lee Bentham	Lee Bentham
2	Long Beach	California	April 12, 1996	38	2.558787=97.233906 km	0'39:22.510	148.165 km/h	Case Montgomery	Case Montgomery	Case Montgomery	Jeret Schroeder
3	Nazareth	Pennsylvania	April 27, 1996	60	1.5223978=91.343868 km	0'31:32.191	173.787 km/h	Patrick Carpentier	Stuart Crow	Patrick Carpentier	Patrick Carpentier
4	Milwaukee	Wisconsin	June 2, 1996	70	1.6607976=116.255832 km	0'34:32.196	201.970 km/h	Anthony Lazzaro	Paul Jasper	Anthony Lazzaro	Patrick Carpentier
5	Montréal	Québec	June 15, 1996	27	4.4207471=119.3601717 km	0'44:55.555	159.409 km/h	Patrick Carpentier	Patrick Carpentier	Patrick Carpentier	Patrick Carpentier
6	Toronto	Ontario	July 13, 1996	39	2.8709912=111.9686568 km	1'00:24.901	111.199 km/h	Patrick Carpentier	Patrick Carpentier	Patrick Carpentier	Case Montgomery
7	Trois-Rivières	Québec	August 3, 1996	30	2.4236058=72.708174 km	0'34:14.401	127.409 km/h	Patrick Carpentier	Patrick Carpentier	Patrick Carpentier	Patrick Carpentier
8	Trois-Rivières	Québec	August 4, 1996	40	2.4236058=96.944232 km	0'44:56.527	129.425 km/h	Patrick Carpentier	Patrick Carpentier	Patrick Carpentier	Patrick Carpentier
9	Lexington	Ohio	August 10, 1996	30	3.620925=108.62775 km	0'42:30.775	153.310 km/h	Patrick Carpentier	Patrick Carpentier	Patrick Carpentier	Jeret Schroeder
10	Elkhart Lake	Wisconsin	August 18, 1996	17	6.4372=109.4324 km	0'36:01.501	182.261 km/h	Patrick Carpentier	Patrick Carpentier	Patrick Carpentier	Chuck West
11	Vancouver	British Columbia	August 31, 1996	38	2.7406379=104.1442402 km	0'49:04.866	127.313 km/h	Patrick Carpentier	Patrick Carpentier	Patrick Carpentier	Patrick Carpentier
12	Monterey	California	September 7, 1996	28	3.6016134=100.8451752 km	0'44:29.641	135.989 km/h	Patrick Carpentier	Patrick Carpentier	Patrick Carpentier	Patrick Carpentier

Note:

Race 1 was held on a combination track; cars used the esses off the backstretch for safety reasons.

== Final points standings ==
=== Driver ===
==== Main championship ====
For every race the points were awarded: 20 points to the winner, 16 for runner-up, 14 for third place, 12 for fourth place, 11 for fifth place, winding down to 1 point for 15th place. Lower placed drivers did not award points. Additional points were awarded to the pole winner (1 point) and to the driver leading the most laps (1 point). C2-class drivers were also able to score points in the main class.

Place	Name	Country	Team	Chassis	Total points	(United States)	(United States)	(United States)	(United States)	(Canada)	(Canada)	(Canada)	(Canada)	(United States)	(United States)	(Canada)	(United States)
1	Patrick Carpentier	Canada	Lynx Racing	Ralt	239	14	16	21	12	22	22	22	22	22	22	22	22
2	Lee Bentham	Canada	P-1 Racing	Ralt	149	18	10	14	14	14	-	14	12	12	14	16	11
3	Paul Jasper	United States	BDJS	Ralt	132	6	12	9	12	12	14	16	16	-	12	14	9
4	Case Montgomery	United States	Dells Racing	Ralt	129	9	22	10	16	-	16	-	11	14	9	6	16
5	Jeret Schroeder	United States	Lynx Racing	Ralt	77	12	4	-	10	16	-	-	-	16	-	5	14
6	Anthony Lazzaro	United States	BG Performance Motorsport	Ralt	75	-	6	11	21	-	-	-	5	10	6	12	4
7	Alexandre Tagliani	Canada	P-1 Racing	Ralt	70	5	9	2	8	-	2	6	14	9	11	4	-
8	Eric Lang	United States	D&L Racing	Ralt	60	-	-	-	9	9	12	3	-	6	10	3	8
9	Michael David	United States	PDR Enterprises	Ralt	58	8	11	5	6	5	6	-	6	4	5	2	-
10	Stan Wattles	United States	Metro Racing	Ralt	52	-	-	-	5	8	11	12	9	7	-	-	-
11	Robert Sollenskog	Sweden	BRS Motorsports	Ralt	51	7	1	-	3	-	10	7	10	-	7	-	6
12	Chuck West	United States	World Speed Motorsports	Ralt	48	-	14	-	-	-	-	-	-	8	16	-	10
13	Cam Binder	Canada	Binder Racing	Ralt	42	-	-	8	-	6	9	-	-	5	4	10	-
14	Charles Nearburg	United States	NRC	Ralt	41	-	8	-	-	10	-	-	-	11	-	-	12
15	Tony Ave	United States	Olsson Engineering	Ralt	31	20	-	-	-	11	-	-	-	-	-	-	-
16	Christian Vandal	Canada	RDS Motorsports	Ralt	29	10	-	12	7	-	-	-	-	-	-	-	-
17	Frank Allers	Canada	Johnston Engineering	Reynard	25	-	5	-	-	-	7	-	-	-	-	11	2
18	Stuart Crow	United States	BDJS	Ralt	24	-	7	17	-	-	-	-	-	-	-	-	-
19	Mike Shank	United States	Shank Racing	Swift	20	-	-	6	-	4	-	1	8	1	-	-	-
20	Martin Roy	Canada	?	Raven	17	-	-	-	-	-	-	10	7	-	-	-	-
21	Russ Bond	Canada	Team Sauce	Reynard	17	1	-	-	-	2	5	-	-	-	-	9	-
22	Sergei Szortyka	United States	J&J Racing	Ralt	17	3	-	4	-	7	3	-	-	-	-	-	-
23	Chris Smith	United States	Intercar Motorsports	Ralt	15	-	-	-	-	-	-	11	4	-	-	-	-
24	Ted Sahley	United States	Weld Motorsports	Reynard	15	2	-	-	1	-	-	8	2	2	-	-	-
25	Dave Cutler	United States	Dells Racing	Ralt	15	4	-	3	4	3	1	-	-	-	-	-	-
26	Mike Agnifilo	United States	AER Enterprises	Swift	13	-	-	-	-	-	-	9	4	-	-	-	-
27	Bill Auberlen	United States	BDJS	Ralt	11	11	-	-	-	-	-	-	-	-	-	-	-
28	Mike Sauce	United States	Team Sauce	Reynard	11	-	-	-	-	-	-	4	-	-	-	7	-
29	Joe Sposato	United States	Sposato Motor Racing	Ralt	11	-	3	-	-	-	-	-	-	3	-	-	5
30	Thane Sellers	United States	Team Sauce	Reynard	10	-	-	-	-	-	8	2	-	-	-	-	-
31	David Pook	United States	Phillips Motorsports	Ralt	8	-	-	-	-	-	-	-	-	-	8	-	-
32	Bernie Schuchmann	Canada	Schuchmann Motorsports	Swift	8	-	-	7	-	1	-	-	-	-	-	-	-
33	Jim Ward	United States	Oppliger Motorsports	Ralt	8	-	-	-	-	-	-	-	-	-	-	8	-
34	Steve O'Hara	United States	Oppliger Motorsports	Ralt	7	-	-	-	-	-	-	-	-	-	-	-	7
35	Jimmy Pugliese	United States	Pugliese Motorsports	Swift	5	-	-	-	-	-	5	-	-	-	-	-	-
36	Scott Wood	United States	Phillips Motorsports	Ralt	4	-	-	-	-	-	4	-	-	-	-	-	-
37	Leandro Larrosa	Argentina	Team Sauce	Reynard	3	-	-	-	-	-	-	-	-	-	3	-	-
	Zak Brown	United States	Intercar Motorsports	Ralt	3	-	-	-	-	-	-	-	-	-	-	-	3
39	Bobby Scolo	United States	RMS Racing	Ralt	2	-	2	-	-	-	-	-	-	-	-	-	-
40	Joe Vantreese	United States	intercar	Ralt	2	-	-	-	2	-	-	-	-	-	-	-	-
41	Brian French	United States	?	Ralt	2	-	-	-	-	-	-	-	-	-	2	-	-
42	Bob Siska	United States	R.J.S. Motorsports	Ralt	2	-	-	-	-	-	-	-	1	-	1	-	-
43	Adam McMutrie	United States	?	Swift	1	-	-	1	-	-	-	-	-	-	-	-	-
	Bob McGregor	Canada	McGregor Racing	Reynard	1	-	-	-	-	-	-	-	-	-	-	1	-
	Mike Palumbo	United States	Palumbo Motorsports	Ralt	1	-	-	-	-	-	-	-	-	-	-	-	1

==== C2-Class championship ====
Points system see above.

Place	Name	Country	Team	Chassis	Total points	(United States)	(United States)	(United States)	(United States)	(Canada)	(Canada)	(Canada)	(Canada)	(United States)	(United States)	(Canada)	(United States)
1	Mike Shank	United States	Shank Racing	Swift	135	9	-	16	11	21	14	10	21	17	16	-	-
2	Mike Sauce	United States	Team Sauce	Reynard	109	11	7	10	14	7	11	12	11	-	-	14	12
3	Jimmy Pugliese	United States	Pugliese Motorsports	Swift	107	14	-	11	11	10	-	14	12	14	-	11	10
4	Ted Sahley	United States	Weld Motorsports	Reynard	106	21	-	-	21	12	-	16	15	21	-	-	-
5	Russ Bond	Canada	Team Sauce	Reynard	95	16	10	12	-	16	14	-	9	-	-	18	-
6	Frank Allers	Canada	Johnston Engineering	Reynard	89	-	22	-	-	-	9	16	-	-	-	20	22
7	Bernie Schuchmann	Canada	Schuchmann Motorsports	Swift	66	10	8	22	12	14	-	-	-	-	-	-	-
8	David Brien	United States	This Side Up Racing	Reynard	52	-	14	-	16	11	-	-	-	-	-	-	11
9	Thane Sellers	United States	Team Sauce	Reynard	47	-	-	-	-	6	20	11	10	-	-	-	-
10	Mike Agnifilo	United States	AER Enterprises	Swift	42	-	-	-	-	4	-	22	16	-	-	-	-
11	Paul Raleigh	United States	?	Swift	25	-	-	-	-	-	-	-	-	-	16	9	-
12	Dan Vosloo	United States	?	Reynard	24	12	12	-	-	-	-	-	-	-	-	-	-
13	Buddy Brundo	United States	Hammerhead Racing	Swift	23	-	9	-	-	-	-	-	-	-	-	-	14
14	Brian Dunkel	United States	?	Swift	22	-	-	-	-	-	-	-	-	-	12	10	-
15	Leandro Larrosa	Argentina	Team Sauce	Reynard	20	-	-	-	-	-	-	-	-	-	20	-	-
16	Rick Ferguson	United States	?	Swift	16	-	16	-	-	-	-	-	-	-	-	-	-
	Steve Hall	United States	?	Reynard	16	-	-	-	-	-	-	-	-	-	-	-	16
18	Adam McMutrie	United States	?	Swift	14	-	-	14	-	11	-	-	-	-	-	-	-
19	Bob McGregor	Canada	McGregor Racing	Reynard	12	-	-	-	-	-	-	-	-	-	-	12	-
20	John Brooks	United States	Port-A-Pool Racing	Swift	11	-	11	-	-	-	-	-	-	-	-	-	-
	Brian Battaglia	United States	?	Swift	11	-	-	-	-	-	-	-	-	-	11	-	-
22	Ron Caldwell	United States	Pugliese Motorsports	Swift	9	9	-	-	-	-	-	-	-	-	-	-	-
23	John McCaig	Canada	Binder Racing	Swift	8	-	-	-	-	8	-	-	-	-	-	-	-

Note:

No more competitors in C2-class.

== See also ==
- 1996 IndyCar season
- 1996 Indy Lights season
- 1996 Indy Racing League season
- 1996–1997 Indy Racing League season
