= Jovy Marcelo =

Filipino race car driver (1965–1992)

- Born: Edward Jovy Jacinto Marcelo; 20 April 1965; Quezon City, Philippines
- Died: 15 May 1992 (aged 27); Speedway, Indiana, U.S.
- Cause of death: Injuries sustained at the 1992 Indianapolis 500
- Resting place: Loyola Memorial Park, Marikina, Metro Manila, Philippines
- Children: 2

CART Indy Car World Series
- Years active: 1992
- Teams: EuroInternational
- Starts: 3
- Wins: 0
- Poles: 0

Previous series
- 1991–1992: Toyota Atlantic Championship

Championship titles
- 1991: Toyota Atlantic Championship

Edward Jovy Jacinto Marcelo (April 20, 1965 – May 15, 1992) was a Filipino racing driver who competed in the CART Indy Car World Series. Marcelo won the 1991 Toyota Atlantic Championship ahead of Jimmy Vasser by four points. He was killed in an accident during practice for the 1992 Indianapolis 500.

== Early career and education ==
Marcelo came from a racing family, with his father Edward ("Eddie") racing dragsters, motorcycles, and speedboats in Southeast Asia (mainly in Malaysia, the Philippines and Macau). He began his racing career at the age of 11 in go-karts.

Marcelo studied in the United States at St. Mary's and at Armstrong College in Berkeley, California.

== Career ==
Bitten with the racing bug, Marcelo pursued racing full-time right after graduating with a business degree. With the financial support of his father, he raced in junior formulas in the United Kingdom before moving to the New Zealand series.

In 1990, Marcelo returned to the United States and competed in the Toyota Atlantic Championship with Duane Anderson's team. Marcelo finished second in the championship behind Mark Dismore and earned the Rookie of the Year title.

In 1991, Marcelo continued in Toyota Atlantic, replacing Dismore in Bill Fickling's P-1 Racing Team. Marcelo won races at Lime Rock Park and Nazareth Speedway. Marcelo won the season championship, beating Jimmy Vasser by four points.

== CART career ==
In 1992, Marcelo graduated to Indy cars. Marcelo had a pre-season test with Derrick Walker's Walker Motorsports, and earned a seat with the EuroInternational team owned by Antonio Ferrari. Marcelo competed in three CART PPG Cup events, finishing 14th in Surfers Paradise (Australia), 19th in Phoenix and 19th in Long Beach. (He did not score points in these events; CART points only awarded to 12th, plus pole and most laps awards.) In May, Marcelo was entered in the Indianapolis 500 driving a Lola T91/00-Cosworth DFS and participated in rookie orientation and practice for the event.

=== Death ===
On May 15, 1992, during warmups, Marcelo's car snapped around at warmup speed and impacted into a concrete wall entering turn 1 at 172 miles per hour (277 km/h). He died instantly due to a blunt force head injury. It was alleged that Marcelo's helmet only had an anti-rotational tether strap on the left side of his head, leaving his head and neck vulnerable on the right (drivers subsequently wore them on both sides as a preventative measure; the HANS Device was not mandatory until 2001). Marcelo was 27 at the time of his death. He died on the tenth anniversary of the death of Gordon Smiley, who died at the same track while attempting to qualify for the 1982 Indianapolis 500. Marcelo left behind his wife Irene, son Karsten, and an unborn son who was given the name Jovy Nicolai.

Funeral services were held for Marcelo in Hillsborough, California before his remains were flown back to the Philippines. He was laid to rest at the Loyola Memorial Park in Marikina.

== Legacy ==
Following his death, the Toyota Atlantic Championship created the Jovy Marcelo Sportsmanship Award, which is given annually to the driver who best exemplifies the sportsmanship of Marcelo. The First Jovy Marcelo sportsmanship award was presented to Bert Hart for the 1992–1993 season. He named his first son Jovy Kakoa Hart. Frankie Muniz won the 2008 IMSA Cooper Tires Atlantic Championship Jovy Marcelo Sportsmanship Award.

Jimmy Vasser, Marcelo's championship rival in the 1991 Toyota Atlantic Championship, described Marcelo as a great person, and "real soft-spoken, but in the car, he was not afraid to race you hard, wheel-to-wheel," likening his driving style to Paul Tracy.

== Career results ==
=== Atlantic Championship ===
Year	Team	1	2	3	4	5	6	7	8	9	10	11	12	13	14	Rank	Points
1991	Team Marcelo	LBH; 3	PIR; 2	LRP; 1	MTL; 4	WGI; Ret	DES; 5	TOR; 8	TRR; 6	VAN; 6	MOH; 2	NAZ; 1	LS1; 2	LS2; 4		1st	76
1992	Team Marcelo	MIA; Ret	PIR	LBH	LRP	MTL	WGI	TOR	TRR	VAN	MOH	MOS	NAZ	LS1	LS2	NC	0

=== Complete CART results ===
Year	Team	No.	1	2	3	4	5	6	7	8	9	10	11	12	13	14	15	16	Rank	Points	Ref
1992	EuroInternational	50	SRF; 14	PNX; 19	LBH; 19	INDY; DNQ	DET	POR	MIL	NHM	TOR	MIS	CLE	ROA	VAN	MOH	NAZ	LS	43rd	0	

== See also ==
- List of Indianapolis 500 fatal accidents

Sporting positions
Preceded by Mark Dismore; 1990 Pacific Division Champion	Toyota Atlantic Champion; 1991	Succeeded by Chris Smith
Preceded by Brian Till; 1990 Atlantic Division Champion	Toyota Atlantic Champion; 1991	Succeeded by Chris Smith
