= Stuart Crow =

American racing driver

- Born: August 21, 1959 (age 67) Dallas, Texas, US
- Retired: 2001

Championship titles
- 1990 2000: Formula Super Vee; US Formula 3

Stuart Crow (born August 21, 1959) is an American former racing driver. Crow won the 1990 United States Formula Super Vee Championship and the 2000 United States Formula 3 Championship.

== Early life ==
Crow was born in Dallas, Texas, the son of real estate developer Trammell Crow. His siblings are Robert, Howard, Harlan, Trammell S., and Lucy.

== Career ==
=== 1983-1986: Formula Ford, Formula 2000 ===
Crow’s introduction to motorsports began with dirt bikes and, later, IKF and WKA Karting. He subsequently graduated to racing cars, starting with Formula Ford and Formula 2000. He quickly showed his mettle, winning the Formula 2000 class at the SCCA National Run-offs at Road Atlanta in 1985. The following season Crow graduated to the Canadian Formula 2000 Championship and scored his first professional victory at Quebec’s Sanair Super Speedway en route to sixth place in the series. In October 1986, Crow finished third at the CASC F2000 Grand National Canadian Run-off.

=== 1987-2000: Formula Super Vee, Formula Atlantic, Formula Three ===
In the late 1980's, Crow took the next step on the professional racing ladder, by competing in the Bosch VW Formula Super Vee Series, a national championship that propelled Michael Andretti, Al Unser Jr. and Arie Luyendyk into North America's premiere racing series' (Cart, IndyCar and IMSA). After contesting several races with smaller teams, Crow joined Ralt America in mid-1988 with immediate results, reeling-off a string of top ten finishes including a fifth place in the season finale that helped him secure eighth place in the season standings. Crow became a regular contender in the 1989 Super Vee series with eight top five finishes in a season that culminated with a win at St. Petersburg, the final event of a season that saw him finish third in the overall standings.

Crow began the 1990 Formula Super Vee season with back-to-back victories at Phoenix International Raceway and the Milwaukee Mile before posting a string of podium finishes at Cleveland, Road Atlanta, Mid-Ohio and Road America. Crow scored a third win at Nazareth Speedway before the season final at St.Petersburg where he drove a measured race, finished fourth and clinched the 1990 Bosch VW Super Vee Championship.

In 1991, Crow drove for BDJS/Ralt America in the United States Formula Atlantic Championship. Crow earned podium finishes on the streets of Des Moines and Watkins Glen, as well as a fourth place in the series’ most iconic race on the streets of Trois Rivieres in Quebec. The highlight of the season came in Canada where Crow scored his first Formula Atlantic win at the Grand Prix of Toronto, a result that helped him secure fourth place overall in his first season of Formula Atlantic.

The following 16 months were perhaps the most productive of Crow’s racing career, although he fell just short of two championships. He stayed with BDJS/Ralt America for the 1992 Formula Atlantic Championship. Crow scored a dominant win at Mid-Ohio to compliment runner-up finishes at Mosport and Vancouver, a third place at Miami and a fourth place at Long Beach en route to third place in the overall standings. BDJS/Ralt America spent the first half of the 1992 season developing the new Ralt RT-40, likely missing out on several potential wins because of inevitable new car “teething” problems. Crow won three pole positions in 1992. He converted pole into a win at Mid-Ohio but mechanical retirements while leading at Circuit Trois-Rivières and at Nazareth ultimately cost him a chance at the championship.

At the end of the 1992 Formula Atlantic season, Crow teamed up with Dave McMillan Racing and journeyed Down Under to contest the 1993 New Zealand Formula Pacific Series. Crow scored wins at Timaru and the historic Pukekohe circuit, along with four runner-up finishes at Timaru, Wigram and Manfeild. A misunderstanding about the starting procedure in the final race of the series cost him a realistic chance at the championship and he was forced to settle for second place, three points adrift of veteran Kiwi Craig Baird and twenty five points ahead of Jos Verstappen.

Crow returned to the Northern Hemisphere that spring for another Formula Atlantic campaign with BDJS/Ralt America. Crow won the 1993 season opener at Phoenix but crashed heavily in round three at Road Atlanta and subsequently had to withdraw from the championship after five rounds.

Although 1993 would effectively prove to be Crow's final season of professional racing, on the three occasions when he returned to professional racing he continued to be competitive. In 1994 Crow drove for Florida Sports Cars in the American Continental Championship at the Dallas Grand Prix and won. In 1996 Crow drove for BDJS/Ralt America at the fourth round of the Players's Toyota Atlantic Championship at Nazareth. He won pole and finished second to the eventual championship winner Patrick Carpentier. Years later, in 2000, Crow contested the United States Formula Three Championship with Dave McMillan Racing and won the championship scoring three wins and four additional podiums.

== Racing record ==
=== Career summary ===
Season	Series	Team	Races	Wins	Poles	FLaps	Podiums	Points	Position
1985	SCCA National Championship Runoffs	Wyndham Racing	1	1	0	1	1	N/A	1st
1986	Canadian F2000 Championship	Florida Sports Cars	9	1	0	0	N/A	138	6th
1986	CASC F2000 Grand National Canadian Run-off	Florida Sports Cars	1	0	0	0	1	N/A	3rd
1986	SCCA Formula Ford Nationals	Florida Sports Cars	5	1	1	0	5	N/A	N/A
1987	Formula Super Vee	Ralt of America	12	0	0	0	0	N/A	N/A
1988	Formula Super Vee	Ralt America	13	0	0	0	0	83	8th
1989	Formula Super Vee	Ralt America	11	1	0	0	3	123	3rd
1990	Formula Super Vee	Ralt America	9	3	1	4	7	144	1st
1991	Formula Atlantic	BDJS	13	1	0	N/A	3	103	4th
1992	Formula Atlantic	BDJS	14	1	3	0	7	134	3rd
1993	Formula Pacific	Dave McMillan Racing; BDJS	10	2	2	N/A	7	199	2nd
1993	Formula Atlantic	Dave McMillan Racing; BDJS	4	1	0	1	1	30	15th
1994	SCCA American Continental Championship	Florida Sports Cars	1	1			1	20	15th
1996	Formula Atlantic	BDJS	2		1		1	24	18th
2000	Formula Three	Dave McMillan Racing	11	3	3	8	3	152	1st

=== American and International Open Wheel racing results ===
(key)

=== SCCA National Championship Runoffs ===
Year	Track	Car	Engine	Class	Pos.	Class Pos.	Start	Status
1985	Road Atlanta	Swift DB-3	Ford Loyning	F2000	9	1	13	Running

=== CASC F2000 Grand National Canadian Run-off ===
Year	Track	Car	Engine	Class	Finish	Start	Status
1986	St. Jovite	Swift DB-3	Ford Loyning	F2000	3	5	Running

=== Canadian F2000 ===
Canadian F2000 results
Year	Team	Chassis	Engine	1	2	3	4	5	6	7	8	9	Rank	Points
1986	Florida Sports Cars	Swift DB-3 F2000	Ford Loyning	MOS; 13	MON; 10	MOS; 8	MNT; 5	MOS; 9	SAN; 1	SAN; 4	MOS; 5	MNT; 3	6th	138

=== Formula Super Vee ===
Formula Super Vee results
Year	Team	Chassis	Engine	1	2	3	4	5	6	7	8	9	10	11	Rank	Points
1989	Ralt America	Ralt RT5/89	VW Brabham	PHX; Ret	DAL; 6	IRP; 4	MIL; 6	CLE; 5	DEM; 3	ATL; 7	MOH; 5	ROA; 3	NAZ; 5	STP; 1	3rd	123
1990	Ralt America	Ralt RT5/90	VW Brabham	PHX; 1	MIL; 1	CLE; 2	DEM; 6	ATL; 2	MOH; 3	ROA; 2	NAZ; 1	IRP; 4	STP; 4		1st	144

=== Formula Atlantic ===
Formula Atlantic results
Year	Team	Chassis	Engine	1	2	3	4	5	6	7	8	9	10	11	12	13	14	15	Rank	Points
1991	BDJS	Swift DB-4	Toyota Quicksilver	LBH; 6	PHX; 8	LRP; 4	MON; 15	WGI; 3	DEM; 2	TOR; 1	RCS1; NC	RCS2; NC	CTR; 4	VAN; Ret	MOH; 16	NAZ; 5	LS1; Ret	LS2; Ret	4th	103
1992	BDJS	Swift DB-4, Ralt RT-40	Toyota Loyning	MIA; 3	PHX; 5	LBH; 4	LRP; 4	MON; Ret	WGI; 6	TOR; Ret	CTR; Ret	VAN; 2	MOH; 1	MOS; 2	NAZ; Ret	LS1; 5	LS2; 6		3rd	134
1993	BDJS	Ralt RT-40	Toyota Loyning	PHX; 1	LBH; Ret	ATL; Ret	MIL; 7	MON; Ret	MOS	HAL	TOR	CTR	VAN	MOH	NAZ	LS1	LS2		15th	30
1996	BDJS	Ralt RT-40	Toyota Loyning	HMS; 1	LBH; 9	NAZ; 2	MIL	MON	TOR	CTR1	CTR2	MOH	ROA	VAN	LS				18th	24

Non-championship race

=== Formula Pacific ===
Formula Pacific results
Year	Team	Chassis	Engine	1	2	3	4	5	6	7	8	9	10	Rank	Points
1993	Dave McMillan Racing	RT-40	Toyota Loyning	TIM1; 1	TIM2; 2	TER1; 4	TER2; Ret	WIG1; 2	WIG2; 4	MAN1; 2	MAN2; 2	PUK1; 6	PUK2; 1	2nd	210

=== American Continental Championship ===
American Continental Championship results
Year	Team	Chassis	Engine	1	2	3	4	5	6	7	Rank	Points
1994	Florida Sports Cars	Van Diemen RF-94	Ford	MOS1	WGI	DEM	CTR	MOS2	ATL	DAL; 1	15th	20

=== US Formula 3 ===
US Formula 3 results
Year	Team	Chassis	Engine	1	2	3	4	5	6	7	8	9	10	11	Rank	Points
2000	Dave McMillan Racing	Ralt RT-40	Volkswagen Bertils	HAL1; 5	HAL2; 1	MEM1; 1	MEM2; 1	STC1; 3	STC2; 5	WGI; 2	SPR1; 3	SPR2; 5	SDG1; 2	SDG2; 4	1st	152
