= 1991 Atlantic Championship =

1991 Toyota Atlantic Championship season
- SCCA Toyota Atlantic Championship

Season
- Races: 13
- Start date: April 14th
- End date: October 20th

Awards
- Drivers' champion: (Philippines) Jovy Marcelo

The 1991 Toyota Atlantic Championship season was contested over 13 rounds. There were also two non-championship events at Race City Speedway in Calgary. The SCCA Toyota Atlantic Championship Drivers' Champion was Jovy Marcelo.

== Races ==
Rnd	Race Name	Circuit	City/Location	Date	Pole position	Winning driver
1	(United States) 1991 Long Beach	Long Beach Street Circuit	Long Beach, California	April 14	(United States) Jimmy Vasser	(United States) Jimmy Vasser
2	(United States) 1991 Phoenix	Phoenix International Raceway	Phoenix, Arizona	April 20	(United States) Jamie Galles	(United States) John Tanner
3	(United States) 1991 Lime Rock	Lime Rock Park	Lakeville, Connecticut	May 27	(United States) Jimmy Vasser	(Philippines) Jovy Marcelo
4	(Canada) 1991 Montréal	Circuit Gilles Villeneuve	Montreal, Quebec	June 2	(United States) Jimmy Vasser	(United States) Jimmy Vasser
5	(United States) 1991 Watkins Glen	Watkins Glen International	Watkins Glen, New York	June 29	(Philippines) Jovy Marcelo	(United States) Jimmy Vasser
6	(United States) 1991 Des Moines	Des Moines Street Circuit	Des Moines, Iowa	July 14	(United States) Jimmy Vasser	(United States) Jimmy Vasser
7	(Canada) 1991 Toronto	Toronto Street Circuit	Toronto, Ontario	July 21	(United States) Jimmy Vasser	(United States) Stuart Crow
NC	(Canada) 1991 Calgary 1	Race City Speedway	Calgary, Alberta	August 4	(Canada) Trevor Seibert	(Canada) Trevor Seibert
NC	(Canada) 1991 Calgary 2	Race City Speedway	Calgary, Alberta	August 5	(Canada) Trevor Seibert	(Canada) Trevor Seibert
8	(Canada) 1991 Trois-Rivières	Circuit Trois-Rivières	Trois-Rivières, Quebec	August 18	(Canada) Claude Bourbonnais	(Canada) Jacques Villeneuve Sr.
9	(Canada) 1991 Vancouver	Streets of Vancouver	Vancouver, British Columbia	September 1	(Canada) Trevor Seibert	(Canada) Stéphane Proulx
10	(United States) 1991 Mid-Ohio	Mid-Ohio Sports Car Course	Lexington, Ohio	September 14	(United States) Jimmy Vasser	(United States) Jimmy Vasser
11	(United States) 1991 Nazareth	Nazareth Speedway	Nazareth, Pennsylvania	October 6	(United States) Steve O'Hara	(Philippines) Jovy Marcelo
12	(United States) 1991 Laguna Seca 1	Mazda Raceway Laguna Seca	Monterey, California	October 19	(United States) Jimmy Vasser	(United States) John Tanner
13	(United States) 1991 Laguna Seca 2	Mazda Raceway Laguna Seca	Monterey, California	October 20	(United States) Jimmy Vasser	(United States) Jimmy Vasser

Oval/Speedway
Road Course/Street Circuit
Non-championship race

== Final driver standings (Top 12) ==
Pos	Driver	Pts
1	(Philippines) Jovy Marcelo	157
2	(United States) Jimmy Vasser	153
3	(United States) John Tanner	113
4	(United States) Stuart Crow	103
5	(United States) Charlie Nearburg	89
6	(United States) Chris Smith	81
7	(United States) Steve O'Hara	80
8	(United States) Bert Hart	77
9	(United States) Jamie Galles	76
10	(United States) Freddy Rhemrev	58
11	(United States) Jon Miranda	52
12	(Canada) Stéphane Proulx	52

== See also ==
- 1991 IndyCar season
- 1991 Indy Lights season
