= 1992 Atlantic Championship =

1992 Toyota Atlantic Championship season
- SCCA Toyota Atlantic Championship

Season
- Races: 14
- Start date: February 2nd
- End date: October 18th

Awards
- Drivers' champion: (United States) Chris Smith

The 1992 Toyota Atlantic Championship season was contested over 14 rounds. The SCCA Toyota Atlantic Championship Drivers' Champion was Chris Smith.

== Races ==
Rnd	Race Name	Circuit	City/Location	Date	Pole position	Winning driver
1	(United States) 1992 Miami	Bicentennial Park	Miami, Florida	February 22	(United Kingdom) Russell Spence	(United Kingdom) Russell Spence
2	(United States) 1992 Phoenix	Phoenix International Raceway	Phoenix, Arizona	April 4	(United States) Jamie Galles	(United Kingdom) Russell Spence
3	(United States) 1992 Long Beach	Streets of Long Beach	Long Beach, California	April 10	(United States) Chris Smith	(United States) Mark Dismore
4	(United States) 1992 Lime Rock	Lime Rock Park	Lakeville, Connecticut	May 23	(United States) Chris Smith	(United States) Chris Smith
5	(Canada) 1992 Montréal	Circuit Gilles Villeneuve	Montreal, Quebec	June 13	(United States) Chris Smith	(United States) Chris Smith
6	(United States) 1992 Watkins Glen	Watkins Glen International	Watkins Glen, New York	June 27	(United Kingdom) Russell Spence	(United Kingdom) Russell Spence
7	(Canada) 1992 Toronto	Exhibition Place	Toronto, Ontario	July 18	(United Kingdom) Russell Spence	(Canada) David Empringham
8	(Canada) 1992 Trois-Rivières	Circuit Trois-Rivières	Trois-Rivières, Quebec	August 16	(United States) Stuart Crow	(United States) Chris Smith
9	(Canada) 1992 Vancouver	Streets of Vancouver	Vancouver, British Columbia	August 29	(United States) Chris Smith	(Canada) Patrick Carpentier
10	(United States) 1992 Mid-Ohio	Mid-Ohio Sports Car Course	Lexington, Ohio	September 12	(United States) Stuart Crow	(United States) Stuart Crow
11	(Canada) 1992 Mosport	Mosport International Raceway	Bowmanville, Ontario	September 20	(Canada) David Empringham	(Canada) David Empringham
12	(United States) 1992 Nazareth	Nazareth Speedway	Nazareth, Pennsylvania	October 3	(United States) Stuart Crow	(Norway) Harald Huysman
13	(United States) 1992 Laguna Seca 1	Mazda Raceway Laguna Seca	Monterey, California	October 17	(United States) Charlie Nearburg	(United States) Mark Dismore
14	(United States) 1992 Laguna Seca 2	Mazda Raceway Laguna Seca	Monterey, California	October 18	(United States) Charlie Nearburg	(United States) Mark Dismore

Oval/Speedway
Road Course/Street Circuit

== Final driver standings (Top 12) ==
Pos	Driver	Pts
1	(United States) Chris Smith	150
2	(New Zealand) Steve Cameron	145
3	(United States) Stuart Crow	134
4	(United Kingdom) Russell Spence	99
5	(Canada) David Empringham	96
6	(United States) Charlie Nearburg	90
7	(United States) Jamie Galles	76
8	(United States) Mark Dismore	72
9	(Norway) Harald Huysman	70
10	(United States) Bert Hart	63
11	(Canada) Patrick Carpentier	59
12	(United States) Peter Faucetta	59

== See also ==
- 1992 IndyCar season
- 1992 Indy Lights season
