= 2010 Bank of America 500 =

Race details
- Race 31 of 36 in the 2010 NASCAR Sprint Cup Series
- Layout of Charlotte Motor Speedway
- Date: October 16, 2010
- Location: Charlotte Motor Speedway, Concord, North Carolina
- Course: Permanent racing facility
- Course length: 1.5 miles (2.4 km)
- Distance: 334 laps, 501 mi (806.281 km)
- Weather: Sunny with a high around 71 °F (22 °C); wind out of the NNW at 7 miles per hour (11 km/h).
- Average speed: 140.391 miles per hour (225.937 km/h)

Pole position
Driver	Jeff Gordon	Hendrick Motorsports
- Time: 28.192

Most laps led
Driver	Kyle Busch	Joe Gibbs Racing
- Laps: 218

Winner
No. 1	Jamie McMurray	Earnhardt Ganassi Racing

Television in the United States
- Network: ABC
- Announcers: Marty Reid, Dale Jarrett and Andy Petree
- Nielsen ratings: 5.345 million

The 2010 Bank of America 500 was a NASCAR Sprint Cup Series race held on October 16, 2010, at Charlotte Motor Speedway in Concord, North Carolina. Contested over 334 laps, it was the thirty-first race during the 2010 NASCAR Sprint Cup Series season, and the fifth race in the season-ending Chase for the Sprint Cup. The race was won by Jamie McMurray, for the Earnhardt Ganassi Racing team. Kyle Busch finished second, and Jimmie Johnson, who started tenth, clinched third.

Pole position driver Jeff Gordon maintained his lead on the first lap to begin the race, as Carl Edwards, who started in the second position on the grid, remained behind him. Soon after, Busch became the leader of the race and would maintain a total of 218 laps in first place. After the final caution, Busch led on the restart, but McMurray passed him. McMurray held the lead through the end of the race, becoming the first driver not in the 2010 Chase to win a race during the Chase.

There were nine cautions and 27 lead changes among 19 different drivers throughout the course of the race. It was McMurray's third win in the 2010 season, and the sixth of his career. The result moved him up to 13th in the Drivers' Championship, 75 points ahead Ryan Newman in 14th. Chevrolet maintained its lead in the Manufacturers' Championship, 45 ahead of Toyota and 85 ahead of Ford, with five races remaining in the season. A total of 103,000 people attended the race, while 5.345 million watched it on television.

== Report ==
=== Background ===
Charlotte Motor Speedway, the race track where the race was held.

Charlotte Motor Speedway is one of ten intermediate tracks to hold NASCAR races. The standard track at Charlotte Motor Speedway is a four-turn quad-oval track that is 1.5 miles (2.4 km) long. The track's turns are banked at twenty-four degrees, while the front stretch, the location of the finish line, is five degrees. The back stretch also has a five degree banking. The racetrack has seats for 140,000 spectators.

Before the race, Jimmie Johnson led the Drivers' Championship with 5,673 points, and Denny Hamlin stood in second with 5,637 points. Kevin Harvick followed in third with 5,619 points, thirty-one ahead of Jeff Gordon and fifty-one ahead of Tony Stewart in fourth and fifth respectively. With 5,533 points, Kurt Busch was in sixth, twenty-two points ahead of Carl Edwards, as Jeff Burton with 5,496 points, was thirteen ahead of Kyle Busch, and forty-one in front of Greg Biffle who rounded out the top ten. Matt Kenseth and Clint Bowyer were eleventh and twelfth with 5,432 and 5,426 respective points. In the Manufacturers' Championship, Chevrolet was leading with 220 points, forty-one points ahead of their rival Toyota. Ford, with 141 points, was twenty-two points ahead of Dodge in the battle for third. Johnson was the race's defending champion.

=== Practice and qualifying ===
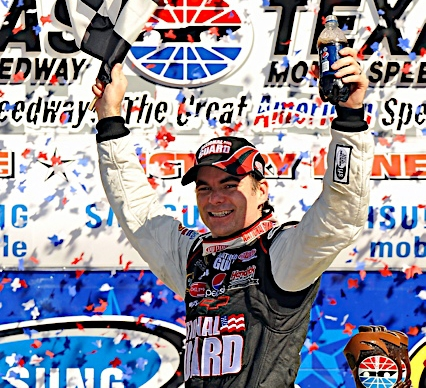
Jeff Gordon won the pole position, qualifying with a fastest time of 28.192.

Three practice sessions were held before the Saturday race—one on Thursday, and two on Friday. The first session lasted 90 minutes, while the second session lasted 45 minutes. The final session lasted 65 minutes. During the first practice session, Stewart–Haas Racing's Ryan Newman was fastest ahead of Joey Logano and Kyle Busch in second and third respectively. Mark Martin placed fourth, and David Reutimann finished fifth. Stewart, Reed Sorenson, Scott Speed, David Ragan, and Juan Pablo Montoya rounded out the top ten fastest drivers in the session.

Forty-nine cars were entered for qualifying, but only forty-three were allowed to race due to NASCAR's qualifying procedure. Gordon clinched his 69th career pole position with a time of 28.192 seconds. He was joined on the front row of the grid by Edwards. A. J. Allmendinger qualified third, Martin took fourth, and Paul Menard started fifth. The six drivers that failed to qualify for the race were Joe Nemechek, Casey Mears, Mike Bliss, Jason Leffler, Kevin Conway and Johnny Sauter. Once the qualifying session completed, Gordon commented, "We used to qualify so well here, but competition and cars and different things changing over the years, we just sort of lost our way here, and I'll be honest, [Thursday], the way it was going, I didn't think we had any shot at this pole."

On the next evening, Kasey Kahne was quickest in the second practice session, ahead of Reutimann and Biffle in second and third. Kurt Busch was fourth quickest, and Martin Truex Jr. took fifth. Brad Keselowski, Allmendinger, Newman, Logano, and Ragan followed in the top-ten. Other drivers in the chase, such as Johnson, was fifteenth, and Harvick, who was twentieth. During the final practice session, Edwards was fastest with a time of 29.031. Sorenson and Kurt Busch followed in second and third with times of 29.133 and 29.135 seconds. Kahne managed to be fourth fastest, ahead of Jamie McMurray and Kyle Busch. Speed was scored seventh, Menard took eighth, Truex was ninth, and Biffle took tenth.

=== Race ===
The race, the thirty-first out of a total of thirty-six in the season, began at 7:30 p.m. EDT and was televised live in the United States on ABC. Prior to the race, weather conditions were sunny with the air temperature around 71 °F (22 °C). Car owner Joe Gibbs began pre-race ceremonies by giving the invocation. Next, Big Machine Records recording artist Danielle Peck performed the national anthem, and NASCAR Hall of Fame inductees gave the command for drivers to start their engines.

Gordon accelerated faster than Edwards off the line, getting ahead of him down the front straightaway. On the following lap, Newman spun sideways and collided into the wall, prompting the first caution to be given. Gordon initially maintained the lead on the restart, though Edwards passed him at the end of the eighth lap. Kyle Busch and Gordon both passed Edwards one lap later. On lap 11, Menard moved to third, as Newman drove to the garage for repairs. Four laps later, Menard took over second, after passing Gordon. After starting tenth, Johnson was scored in fifteenth on the nineteenth lap. On lap 24, the second caution was given because Kurt Busch spun sideways. All the front runners made pit stops during the caution. Gordon was the leader during the restart, as Joey Logano moved to second.

On the following lap, Kyle Busch moved into the first position. The third caution came out on lap 33, after Johnson spun sideways. On the restart, Kyle Busch was first, ahead of Gordon and Logano. After being involved in the first caution, Newman remained in the garage forty laps later. Hamlin, who started twenty-third on the grid, had moved to eleventh by lap 45. By lap 48, Kyle Busch had a 1.9 second lead over Gordon. Harvick had moved nineteen positions to fifth, after 55 laps. On the following lap, Johnson took over twenty-eighth, after spinning on lap 33, as Hamlin claimed the ninth position. On lap 61, Jeff Burton moved to seventh while Travis Kvapil went a lap down to the front runners. Afterward, Burton moved to fifth after passing Menard. The second round of pit stops began on lap 75, when Stewart and Harvick made pit stops. Gordon and Kyle Busch made pit stops two laps later, resulting in Juan Pablo Montoya receiving the lead.

Once Montoya made his pit stop, Kenseth became the leader, but after one lap he chose to make a pit stop, giving the lead to Patrick Carpentier. Carpentier made a pit stop on lap 84, which resulted in Kyle Busch reclaiming the lead. Kyle Busch had a 3.6 second lead by lap 87. Five laps later, Menard took over the seventh position, after passing Harvick. Then, on lap 95, Kyle Busch reported his throttle was sticking. To fix this problem, Busch used the cut-off switch (a switch on the back of the steering wheel to slow the car). Four laps later, Menard fell to the eighth position. On the following lap, Regan Smith was passed by Kyle Busch, putting him a lap behind. Busch reported to his crew that his throttle was improving on lap 105. On the following lap, debris caused the fourth caution. All the front runners made pit stops during the caution, and Johnson reported to his crew that he and Bowyer had collided on pit road. Kyle Busch led the drivers on the restart, ahead of Gordon, Montoya, Biffle, and Logano. One lap later, Biffle moved to second, as Hamlin claimed fifth.

On lap 119, Speed went a lap down after being passed by Busch. The fifth caution was given four laps later because Kahne spun sideways and collided into Sam Hornish Jr., which resulted in the two colliding with the wall. Some front runners made pit stops during the caution. On the restart, Martin was the leader, ahead Truex, McMurray, Montoya, and Johnson. On the following lap, McMurray took over second, as Johnson and Kyle Busch moved past Montoya. Afterward, Hamlin passed Gordon for the eighth position, as McMurray became the leader. By lap 144, McMurray had a 1.25 second lead over Martin. After 146 laps, Newman remained in the garage for repairs. Six laps later, Johnson claimed third, as Hamlin took over the fifth position. On lap 168, Johnson, McMurray, and Martin made their pit stops, seven laps ahead of Kyle Busch.

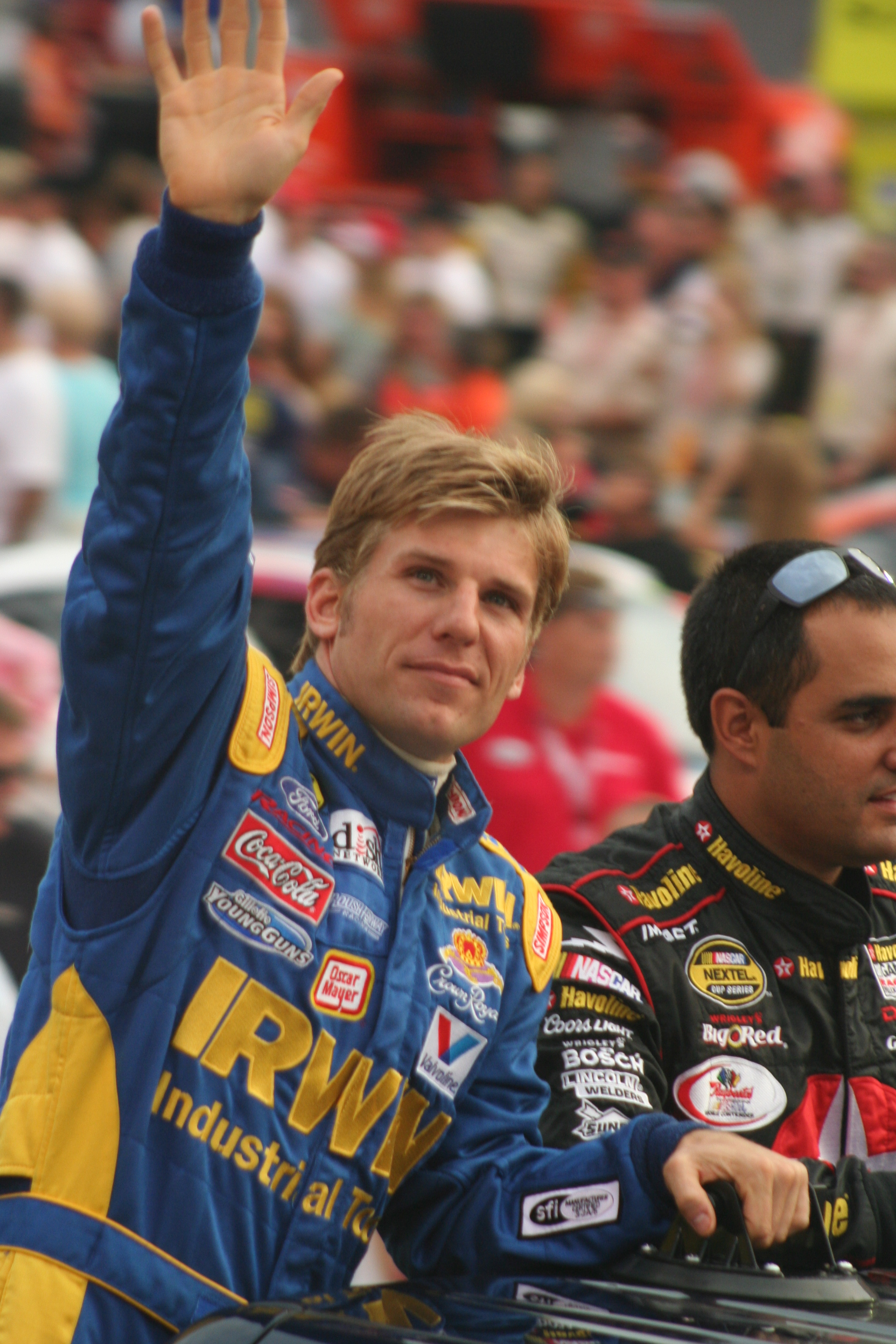
Jamie McMurray won the race after passing Kyle Busch in the final stages of the race.

Once pit stops concluded, Jamie McMurray was the leader. Johnson took over the second position on lap 180. After passing Gordon two laps later, Allmendinger moved to the tenth position. Johnson became the leader on lap 189 after passing McMurray. On the following lap, Gordon's car lost power, which resulted in him making unscheduled pit stop. By the 195th lap, Johnson had a 1.36 second lead over the other drivers, though Kyle Busch began to catch Johnson shortly thereafter. On lap 203, the sixth caution was given because Marcos Ambrose spun near pit road. All the front runners made pit stops during the caution. During the pit stops, Kyle Busch became the leader, after passing Johnson on pit road. On the restart, Busch was first, while Johnson fell to fifth. Hamlin took over the fifth position from Johnson. Afterward, Gordon reported that he had alternator problems on lap 211. Four laps later, Johnson moved to fifth, as McMurray maintained the second position.

By lap 221, Kyle Busch had a 1.30 second lead over McMurray. Hamlin moved to third five laps later. On lap 239, Robby Gordon spun sideways, prompting the seventh caution to be given. During the caution, the front runners made pit stops, which resulted in Busch maintaining the lead ahead of Hamlin, McMurray, Johnson, and Biffle on the restart. On the following lap, Johnson moved to second. On lap 246, Burton spun sideways, after colliding with Bowyer. Burton was the only one to pit during the caution. Afterward, Kyle Busch led Johnson on lap 250. Five laps later, Harvick passed Truex for the seventh position. On lap 261, Logano passed Martin for tenth, as Kenseth moved into eighth. By lap 262, Busch had a 0.74 second lead over Johnson. Six laps later, Speed moved into twelfth, after passing Edwards. Busch expanded his lead to 2.01 seconds by lap 278. Six laps later, McMurray took over the second position from Johnson.

Once Kahne's race car was repaired, J. J. Yeley was put in his car to finish the race for the team, after Kahne became ill. On lap 289, the final pit stop set began. Busch and Johnson made pit stops on lap 294, one lap earlier than McMurray. During the pit stop cycle, Montoya, Sorenson, and Allmendinger briefly held the lead. While on pit road, Gordon received a pass-through penalty for speeding. On lap 299, Kyle Busch became the leader, as pit stops concluded. Three laps later, his lead shrunk to 1.3 seconds. On lap 308, the caution was given because of debris on the track. On the restart Busch led ahead of McMurray, Johnson, and Hamlin. On the following lap, McMurray became the leader. By lap 320, McMurray had a 1.02 second lead over Busch, as a battle for second place began between Busch and Johnson. McMurray crossed the finish line on lap 334 to take his third win of the season, two seconds ahead of Busch, who led the most laps (218). Johnson was third, ahead of Hamlin, Biffle, Kenseth, Logano, Harvick, Reutimann, and Ragan, who rounded out the top ten.

=== Post-race ===
"You just drive your heart out, and if you have the car, then you are able to make those passes, and if you don't, you don't make the passes."

— McMurray speaking after the race.

McMurray appeared in victory lane to celebrate his sixth win of the season in front of 103,000 people who attended the race. McMurray also earned $266,129 in race winnings, and later stated that his car performed best towards the end of the race: "We had a better car than Kyle at the end. He was better at certain stages during the race but at the end of the race, we had the best car."

Busch was rather disappointed with his second-place run: "Jamie got a good restart. I don't know if he got pushed from Jimmie or not, but he had a good run, good momentum getting into Turn 1. Then I got there and my car pushed up the race track ... and he was already gone. There was nothing I could do. I couldn't even stay to his outside. His car turned better than mine. Mine plowed right up the race track and he went right by me. ... It's very, very frustrating. I gave it all I had, but McMurray was better than me." After finishing fourth, Hamlin remained optimistic about his chances in his championship battle with Johnson: "He's a champion, and I'm not. ... He's figured this stuff out, and he's got a great team, as well as we do, but I haven't hit the 'go' button yet, and I feel like there's still more left with our team. I'm minimizing my risk right now, and I feel like, if I'm going to have a shot to win this thing when we get to Homestead [the season finale], I've got to minimize those risks."

The race result left Johnson leading the Drivers' Championship with 5,843 points. He was followed by Hamlin, who remained 41 points behind Johnson, though 36 and 115 points ahead of Harvick and Jeff Gordon respectively. Kyle Busch and Stewart were tied for fifth with 5,666 points, followed by Edwards, Biffle, Kurt Busch, and Burton in seventh through tenth. Kenseth and Bowyer were scored 11th and 12th with 5,587 and 5,543 points respectively. In the Manufacturers' Championship, Chevrolet maintained the lead with 230 points. Toyota held second with 185 points, 40 ahead of Ford and 63 ahead of Dodge. 5.345 million people watched the race on television.

== Results ==
=== Qualifying ===
Grid	No.	Driver	Team	Manufacturer	Time	Speed
1	24	Jeff Gordon	Hendrick Motorsports	Chevrolet	28.192	191.544
2	99	Carl Edwards	Roush Fenway Racing	Ford	28.205	191.455
3	43	A. J. Allmendinger	Richard Petty Motorsports	Ford	28.284	190.921
4	5	Mark Martin	Hendrick Motorsports	Chevrolet	28.285	190.914
5	98	Paul Menard	Richard Petty Motorsports	Ford	28.320	190.678
6	18	Kyle Busch	Joe Gibbs Racing	Toyota	28.325	190.644
7	83	Reed Sorenson	Red Bull Racing Team	Toyota	28.360	190.409
8	88	Dale Earnhardt Jr.	Hendrick Motorsports	Chevrolet	28.364	190.382
9	19	Elliott Sadler	Richard Petty Motorsports	Ford	28.364	190.382
10	48	Jimmie Johnson	Hendrick Motorsports	Chevrolet	28.370	190.342
11	39	Ryan Newman	Stewart–Haas Racing	Chevrolet	28.373	190.322
12	20	Joey Logano	Joe Gibbs Racing	Toyota	28.380	190.275
13	56	Martin Truex Jr.	Michael Waltrip Racing	Toyota	28.380	190.275
14	47	Marcos Ambrose	JTG Daugherty Racing	Toyota	28.403	190.121
15	2	Kurt Busch	Penske Racing	Dodge	28.406	190.101
16	00	David Reutimann	Michael Waltrip Racing	Toyota	28.411	190.067
17	17	Matt Kenseth	Roush Fenway Racing	Ford	28.420	190.007
18	31	Jeff Burton	Richard Childress Racing	Chevrolet	28.449	189.813
19	77	Sam Hornish Jr.	Penske Racing	Dodge	28.452	189.793
20	33	Clint Bowyer	Richard Childress Racing	Chevrolet	28.458	189.753
21	82	Scott Speed	Red Bull Racing Team	Toyota	28.465	189.707
22	16	Greg Biffle	Roush Fenway Racing	Ford	28.480	189.607
23	11	Denny Hamlin	Joe Gibbs Racing	Toyota	28.492	189.527
24	29	Kevin Harvick	Richard Childress Racing	Chevrolet	28.493	189.520
25	9	Kasey Kahne	Richard Petty Motorsports	Ford	28.497	189.494
26	6	David Ragan	Roush Fenway Racing	Ford	28.521	189.334
27	1	Jamie McMurray	Earnhardt Ganassi Racing	Chevrolet	28.531	189.268
28	09	Landon Cassill	Phoenix Racing	Chevrolet	28.533	189.255
29	14	Tony Stewart	Stewart–Haas Racing	Chevrolet	28.546	189.168
30	10	Bobby Labonte	Stavola Labonte Racing	Chevrolet	28.568	189.023
31	12	Brad Keselowski	Penske Racing	Dodge	28.570	189.010
32	78	Regan Smith	Furniture Row Racing	Chevrolet	28.588	188.890
33	46	Michael McDowell	Whitney Motorsports	Chevrolet	28.591	188.871
34	42	Juan Pablo Montoya	Earnhardt Ganassi Racing	Chevrolet	28.593	188.857
35	26	Patrick Carpentier	Latitude 43 Motorsports	Ford	28.601	188.805
36	38	David Gilliland	Front Row Motorsports	Ford	28.614	188.719
37	21	Bill Elliott	Wood Brothers Racing	Ford	28.688	188.232
38	71	Andy Lally	TRG Motorsports	Chevrolet	28.774	187.669
39	7	Robby Gordon	Robby Gordon Motorsports	Toyota	28.795	187.533
40	36	J. J. Yeley	Tommy Baldwin Racing	Chevrolet	28.821	187.363
41	37	Dave Blaney	Front Row Motorsports	Ford	29.113	185.484
42	34	Travis Kvapil	Front Row Motorsports	Ford	29.113	185.484
43	64	Jeff Green	Gunselman Motorsports	Toyota	28.830	187.305
Failed to qualify
44	87	Joe Nemechek	NEMCO Motorsports	Toyota	28.844	187.214
45	13	Casey Mears	Germain Racing	Toyota	28.887	186.935
46	55	Mike Bliss	Prism Motorsports	Toyota	28.939	186.599
47	66	Jason Leffler	Prism Motorsports	Toyota	29.062	185.810
48	07	Kevin Conway	Robby Gordon Motorsports	Toyota	29.065	185.790
49	23	Johnny Sauter	R3 Motorsports	Toyota	29.418	183.561

=== Race results ===
Pos	No.	Driver	Team	Manufacturer	Laps	Points
1	1	Jamie McMurray	Earnhardt Ganassi Racing	Chevrolet	334	190
2	18	Kyle Busch	Joe Gibbs Racing	Toyota	334	180
3	48	Jimmie Johnson	Hendrick Motorsports	Chevrolet	334	170
4	11	Denny Hamlin	Joe Gibbs Racing	Toyota	334	165
5	16	Greg Biffle	Roush Fenway Racing	Ford	334	160
6	17	Matt Kenseth	Roush Fenway Racing	Ford	334	155
7	20	Joey Logano	Joe Gibbs Racing	Toyota	334	151
8	29	Kevin Harvick	Richard Childress Racing	Chevrolet	334	147
9	00	David Reutimann	Michael Waltrip Racing	Toyota	334	138
10	6	David Ragan	Roush Fenway Racing	Ford	334	134
11	42	Juan Pablo Montoya	Earnhardt Ganassi Racing	Chevrolet	334	135
12	99	Carl Edwards	Roush Fenway Racing	Ford	334	132
13	78	Regan Smith	Furniture Row Racing	Chevrolet	334	124
14	5	Mark Martin	Hendrick Motorsports	Chevrolet	334	126
15	56	Martin Truex Jr.	Michael Waltrip Racing	Toyota	334	118
16	47	Marcos Ambrose	JTG Daugherty Racing	Toyota	334	115
17	33	Clint Bowyer	Richard Childress Racing	Chevrolet	334	117
18	83	Reed Sorenson	Red Bull Racing Team	Toyota	334	114
19	82	Scott Speed	Red Bull Racing Team	Toyota	334	106
20	31	Jeff Burton	Richard Childress Racing	Chevrolet	334	108
21	14	Tony Stewart	Stewart–Haas Racing	Chevrolet	334	100
22	10	Bobby Labonte	Stavola Labonte Racing	Chevrolet	333	97
23	24	Jeff Gordon	Hendrick Motorsports	Chevrolet	333	99
24	98	Paul Menard	Richard Petty Motorsports	Ford	333	91
25	43	A. J. Allmendinger	Richard Petty Motorsports	Ford	333	93
26	19	Elliott Sadler	Richard Petty Motorsports	Ford	332	85
27	12	Brad Keselowski	Penske Racing	Dodge	332	82
28	38	David Gilliland	Front Row Motorsports	Ford	332	84
29	88	Dale Earnhardt Jr.	Hendrick Motorsports	Chevrolet	331	76
30	2	Kurt Busch	Penske Racing	Dodge	331	73
31	34	Travis Kvapil	Front Row Motorsports	Ford	331	70
32	37	Dave Blaney	Front Row Motorsports	Ford	331	67
33	7	Robby Gordon	Robby Gordon Motorsports	Toyota	327	64
34	71	Andy Lally	TRG Motorsports	Chevrolet	315	61
35	21	Bill Elliott	Wood Brothers Racing	Ford	305	58
36	39	Ryan Newman	Stewart–Haas Racing	Chevrolet	272	55
37	26	Patrick Carpentier	Latitude 43 Motorsports	Ford	217	57
38	9	Kasey Kahne	Richard Petty Motorsports	Ford	214	49
39	46	Michael McDowell	Whitney Motorsports	Chevrolet	127	51
40	77	Sam Hornish Jr.	Penske Racing	Dodge	122	43
41	64	Jeff Green	Gunselman Motorsports	Toyota	91	40
42	09	Landon Cassill	Phoenix Racing	Chevrolet	89	37
43	36	J. J. Yeley	Tommy Baldwin Racing	Chevrolet	73	34

== Standings after the race ==
Drivers' Championship standings
Rank	Driver	Points
1	Jimmie Johnson	5,843
2	Denny Hamlin	5,802
3	Kevin Harvick	5,766
4	Jeff Gordon	5,687
5	Kyle Busch	5,666
6	Tony Stewart	5,666
7	Carl Edwards	5,643
8	Greg Biffle	5,618
9	Kurt Busch	5,606
10	Jeff Burton	5,604
11	Matt Kenseth	5,587
12	Clint Bowyer	5,543

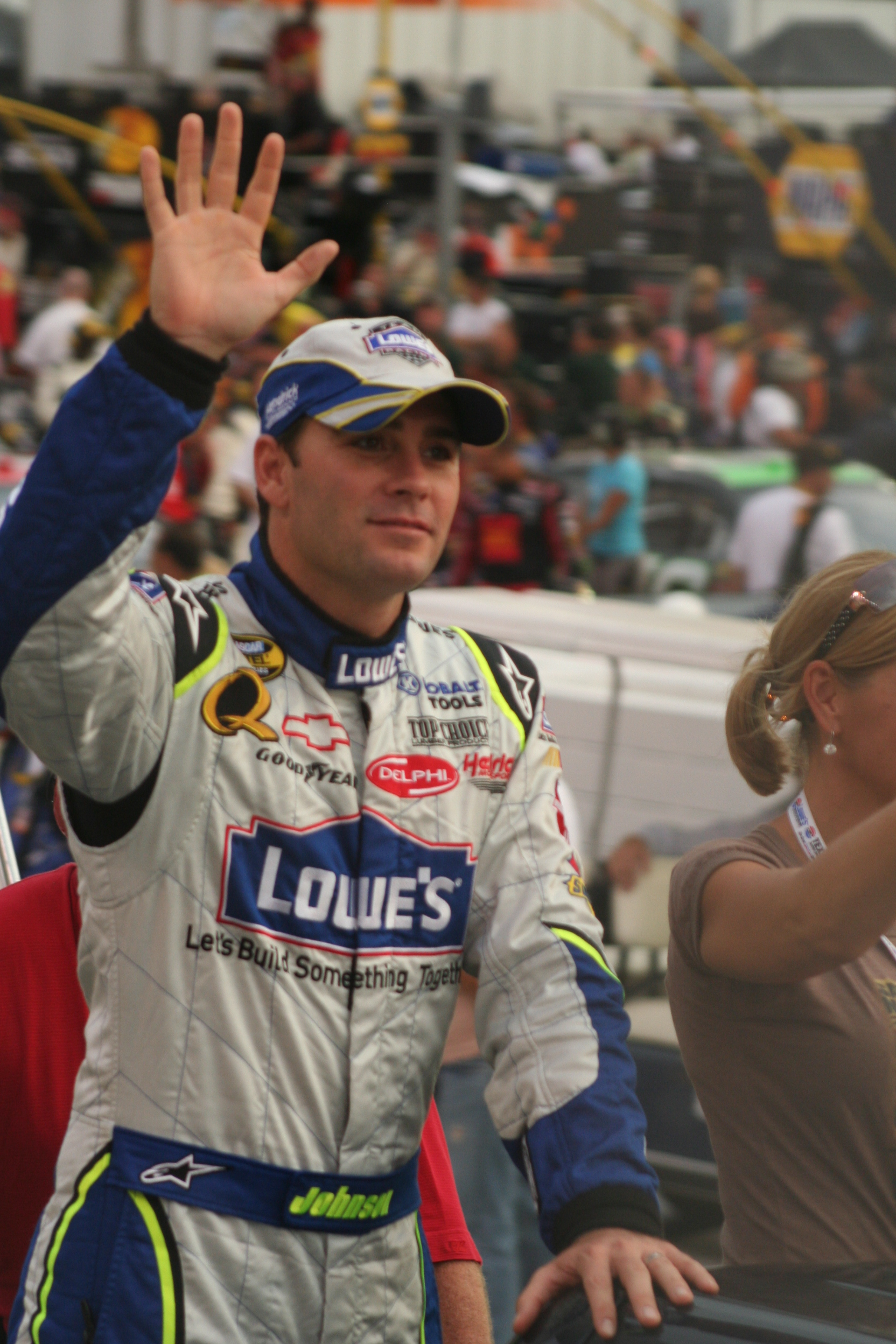
Jimmie Johnson remained the points leader after finishing third in the race.

Manufacturers' Championship standings
Rank	Manufacturer	Points
1	Chevrolet	230
2	Toyota	185
3	Ford	145
4	Dodge	122

- Note: Only the top twelve positions are included for the driver standings. These drivers qualified for the Chase for the Sprint Cup.

Previous race: 2010 Pepsi Max 400	Sprint Cup Series; 2010 season	Next race: 2010 TUMS Fast Relief 500
