= Trammell Crow =

American real estate developer (1914–2009)

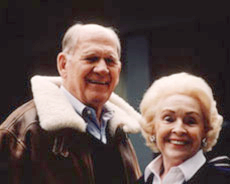
- Trammell Crow (left) and his wife, Margaret
- Born: Fred Trammell Crow; June 10, 1914; Dallas, Texas, U.S.
- Died: January 14, 2009 (aged 94); Tyler, Texas, U.S.
- Resting place: Texas State Cemetery
- Education: Southern Methodist University (BS)
- Occupations: Real estate developer; Art collector
- Political party: Republican
- Spouse: Margaret Doggett (m. 1942)
- Children: 6, including Harlan and Stuart

Fred Trammell Crow (June 10, 1914 – January 14, 2009) was an American real estate developer from Dallas, Texas. He is credited with the creation of several major real estate projects, including the Dallas Market Center, Peachtree Center in Atlanta, Georgia, and the Embarcadero Center in San Francisco, California.

== Biography ==
A native of Dallas, Crow earned money through a series of odd jobs as a child and later as an adolescent, including plucking chickens, cleaning bricks, and unloading boxcars. He was the fifth of eight children reared in East Dallas. His father, Jefferson Crow, worked as a bookkeeper for Collett Munger, one of Dallas' early real estate developers and the builder of the Munger Place subdivision.

Crow graduated from Woodrow Wilson High School in 1932. Unable to attend college because of the Great Depression, he worked at several odd jobs. In 1933, Crow landed a job for roughly $13 a week (equivalent to $323.33 in 2025) as a runner for Mercantile National Bank in Dallas while attending night school in accounting at Southern Methodist University. Upon graduation in 1938, he was, at the age of twenty-four, the youngest CPA in Texas.

He then worked for three years as a Certified Public Accountant before joining the United States Navy in 1940. He used his background in accounting and was offered a commission auditing the books of defense contractors. After World War II, he remained with the Navy for another year to handle final settlements with its contractors. He left the Navy after achieving the rank of commander and then returned to Dallas and saw opportunities for the growth of the city.

He became an agent for North American Van Lines, a moving company. Shortly thereafter, he worked as a wholesale grain merchandiser, tripled the sizes of the warehouses, and erected new loading facilities. Once the grain business faded, he switched at the age of thirty-three to the burgeoning field of warehouse real estate development.

Crow built his first warehouse in 1948 and leased it to Ray-O-Vac Battery Company. The warehouse was larger than what Ray-O-Vac needed, and Crow was able to seek additional tenants. He convinced Decca Records to sign for the leftover space, and began a career as a "speculative builder". This field was a new concept in property development, one in which builders typically designed construction to meet the expressed needs of one specific company, then leased the entire space to that company after the building was in place.

He continued from his start with a single-story warehouse on the banks of the Trinity River in the late 1940s. In partnerships with John M. Stemmons, he became one of the largest developers in the Trinity River Industrial Park. By the middle 1950s, Crow was Dallas' largest warehouse builder.

His company's skyscrapers – including Dallas' 50-story Trammell Crow Center and the 53-story Chase Tower – reshaped skylines in the 1980s in cities stretching from Charlotte, North Carolina to San Diego, California.

== Trammell Crow Company ==
By 1970, Crow had developed the Trammell Crow Company into a nationwide organization, another innovation in a field that was, at the time, dominated strictly by local builders.

Forbes in 1971 and The Wall Street Journal in 1986 called Crow the largest landlord in the US. The Journal said the company he founded was then the largest developer in the nation.

Crow once had interests in nearly 300,000,000 square feet (28,000,000 m^{2}) of developed real estate, comprising eight thousand properties in more than one hundred cities. Crow's holdings were said to be much larger than those of the better-known William Zeckendorf and Donald Trump and include hotels, hospitals, residential developments, and – just as in the early days of the company – warehouses. The Austin Business Journal said in its profile of TCC, "When compared to Trammell Crow, other real estate companies are for the birds."

Yahoo! Finance, also making a joke about the Crow name, said in its company profile: "It takes a tough bird to succeed in the real estate business, and Trammell Crow Company is one of the cocks of the walk." Calling the organization "one of the top diversified real estate management companies in the US," the profile estimates that the company manages nearly 550,000,000 square feet (51,000,000 m^{2}) of warehouse, service center, and retail space in the United States and Canada.

As of June 2007, the company was set to grow even further with the scheduled $60 million purchase of the HealthSouth headquarters building in Birmingham, Alabama.

The Trammell Crow Company was privately held until 1997 when it went public on the New York Stock Exchange (NYSE) under the symbol TCC. In 2006, the firm was sold to CB Richard Ellis group (NYSE:CBRE) for approximately $2.2 billion.

== Art collection ==
Trammell Crow was an enthusiastic collector of East Asian art. His son, Trammell S. Crow, went to Yale University with Alex Kerr, and sometime later, after Kerr was more established, he became an art purchaser in Tokyo for the Trammell Crow Company at the behest of his father. In 1998, 598 of the family's best pieces were donated to the people of Dallas with the founding of the Trammell & Margaret Crow Collection of Asian Art.

He also commissioned several pieces from artist Bjørn Wiinblad, also sculptor David Cargill, incorporating them into his Dallas hotel and real estate projects.

== Personal life ==
In 1981, Crow received the Golden Plate Award of the American Academy of Achievement.

In 1989, Crow was an original inductee of the Woodrow Wilson High School Hall of Fame, which was established in connection with the school's sixtieth anniversary.

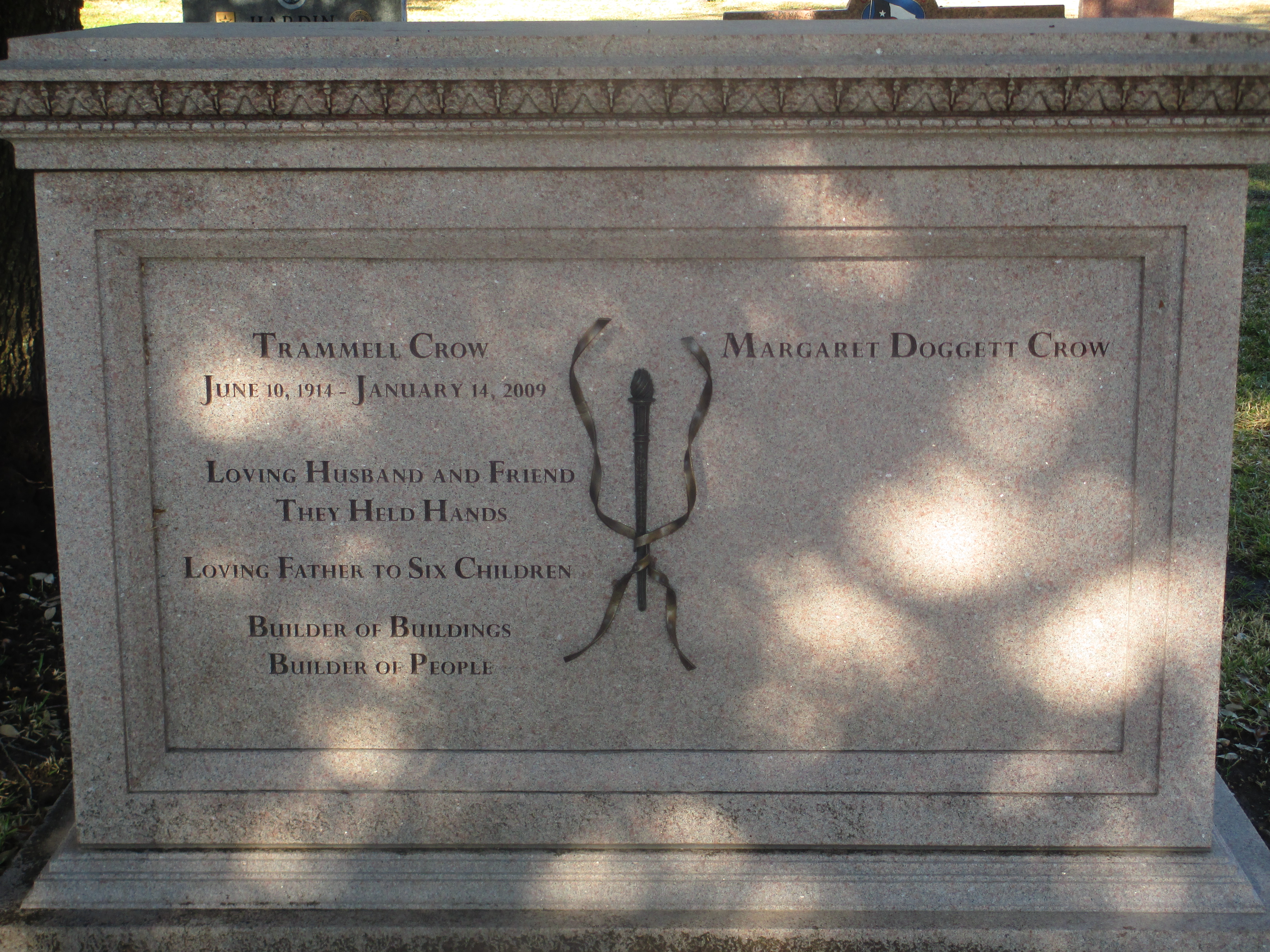
Crow grave marker at Texas State Cemetery in Austin, Texas

Crow was instrumental in bringing to Dallas the 1984 Republican National Convention, which renominated U.S. President Ronald Reagan and Vice President George Herbert Walker Bush. He and his wife, the former Margaret Doggett, were avid collectors of Asian art, for which they established a museum, The Trammell & Margaret Crow Collection of Asian Art. This private museum is open to the public without charge. It is located on Flora Street in the Arts District of downtown Dallas.

Crow married his wife Margaret in 1942. At the time of his death, they had been married for sixty-six years. The couple had six surviving children: Lucy Billingsley, Robert Tramell Crow, Harlan Crow, Howard Crow, Stuart Crow, and Trammell S. Crow. The Crows have sixteen grandchildren and three great-grandchildren. His eldest son, Robert (1943–2011), was addicted to drugs during the 1980s and often found himself in rehabilitation clinics.

Late in life, Crow suffered from Alzheimer's disease. He died at age 94 in his sleep at his ranch in East Texas on January 14, 2009. He is interred at the Texas State Cemetery in Austin, Texas. His widow Margaret died in 2014, five years later, also at the age of 94.

== Awards ==
Crow was awarded the H. Neil Mallon Award by the World Affairs Council in 1986. The H. Neil Mallon Award, hosted by the World Affair Council of Dallas/ Fort Worth, is presented annually to individuals who have excelled at promoting the international focus of North Texas. The prestigious Mallon Award is named after the Council's founder and is presented annually to individuals who have excelled in promoting our region's international profile. Funds raised from this event support the World Affair Council's public and education programming, international exchanges, and diplomatic services.

Trammell Crow Park in Dallas is named after Crow.
