= Lucy Crow Billingsley =

American real estate developer

- Born: Dallas, Texas, U.S.
- Education: University of Texas at Austin
- Occupation: Real estate developer
- Parents: Trammell Crow (father); Margaret Doggett Crow (mother)

Lucy Crow Billingsley is an American real estate developer from Dallas, Texas. She is the only daughter of developer Trammell Crow.

== Early life ==
Billingsley was born in Dallas to Trammell Crow and Margaret Doggett Crow. She has five brothers: Robert, Howard, Harlan, Trammell S., and Stuart.

== Career ==
Billingsley graduated from the University of Texas in 1975 and worked in real estate research and retail brokerage before becoming chief executive of the Dallas Market Center, owned at that time by her father. In 1991 she left to “do it on my own, damn it,” and started a travel agency that grew to be the largest in the region. By 1992 she owned a travel agency, Wyndham Travel Management Company.

After her 1978 marriage, Billingsley separated her assets from those of the rest of the Crow family; she retained shared ownership in many properties with her father and brothers, but her stake was broken out and managed independently. In 1980 she and her husband founded the Crow-Billingsley Investment Company.

Billingsley and her husband and business partner, Henry Billingsley, founded the Billingsley Company in 1978. In 1996 the company began developing land he owned in Plano. She recalled, “He told me, ‘This location is so good, any fool could make it work.’” That initial 300-acre development, International Business Park, held 1.4 million square feet of office space as of 2006.

Subsequent developments included Austin Ranch in North Dallas and One Arts Plaza in the Dallas Arts District, followed by Cypress Waters, a mixed-use development on North Lake in the Dallas area.

== Personal life ==
Billingsley's first marriage lasted less than two years. In 1978 she married Henry Mac Billingsley, a Harvard Business School graduate then working at the Trammell Crow Company. The marriage led the company's senior partners to formalize a rule barring family members who did not carry the Crow name, and Henry Billingsley left the firm. She has four children; her daughter Lucy Burns and son George Billingsley are partners in the Billingsley Company.

In December 1994 the Dallas Observer reported that a federal grand jury was investigating Henry Billingsley's 1992 dealings with Mohamed El Bukhari, Libya's finance minister, whom the Billingsleys and Trammell Crow had hosted in Texas while Henry Billingsley sought foreign buyers for some $200 million in undeveloped land. The newspaper's documents included notes in which Lucy Billingsley briefed her husband on her father's efforts to obtain a visa for El Bukhari. In 1996 Henry Billingsley pleaded guilty to aiding El Bukhari's unlawful entry into Texas from Mexico in 1992, and was sentenced to six months in a halfway house, three years' probation, and a $5,000 fine. Trammell Crow was never charged.

== Honors ==
Billingsley was inducted into the Texas Business Hall of Fame in 2017. She has also been inducted into the Junior Achievement of Dallas Business Hall of Fame and the North Texas Commercial Association of Realtors Hall of Fame, received the 2013 H. Neil Mallon Award from the World Affairs Council of Dallas/Fort Worth, and received the 2023 Virginia Chandler Dykes Leadership Award from Texas Woman's University.
