= Patrick Carpentier =

Canadian racing driver

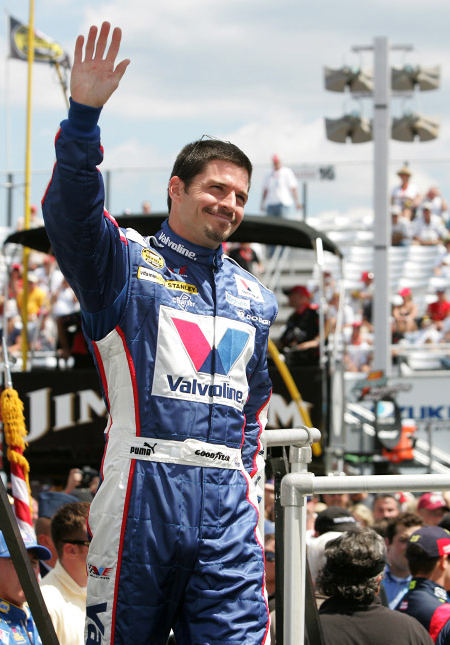
- Carpentier in 2007
- Born: August 13, 1971 (age 55); LaSalle, Quebec, Canada
- Achievements: 1985 Quebec Karting (4stroke) junior champion 1989 Spenard-David racing school series champion 1992 Formula Atlantic (Canada) series champion. 1996 Toyota Atlantic champion 1 Mile Oval: Fastest lap ever recorded by anyone (1998 Nazareth, PA CART) 184.896 mph with a qualifying lap of 18.419 sec.
- Awards: 1997 CART Rookie of the Year

NASCAR Cup Series career
- 42 races run over 6 years
- 2016 position: 47th
- Best finish: 38th (2008)
- First race: 2007 Centurion Boats at the Glen (Watkins Glen)
- Last race: 2016 Brickyard 400 (Indianapolis)
Wins	Top tens	Poles
0	0	1

NASCAR O'Reilly Auto Parts Series career
- 16 races run over 6 years
- Best finish: 50th (2008)
- First race: 2007 NAPA Auto Parts 200 (Montreal)
- Last race: 2012 NAPA Auto Parts 200 (Montreal)
Wins	Top tens	Poles
0	5	1

NASCAR FedEx Freight Truck Series career
- 1 race run over 1 year
- Best finish: 89th (2008)
- First race: 2008 O'Reilly 200 (Bristol)
Wins	Top tens	Poles
0	0	0

NASCAR Canada Series career
- 1 race run over 1 year
- Best finish: 35th (2006)
- First race: 2006 Hot Head Henry 200 (Cayuga)
Wins	Top tens	Poles
0	1	0

IndyCar Series career
- 17 races run over 1 year
- Best finish: 10th (2005)
- First race: 2005 Toyota Indy 300 (Homestead)
- Last race: 2005 Toyota Indy 400 (Fontana)
Wins	Podiums	Poles
0	2	0

Champ Car career
- 140 races run over 8 years
- Best finish: 3rd (2002 2004)
- First race: 1997 Marlboro Grand Prix of Miami (Homestead)
- Last race: 2004 Gran Premio Telmex/Tecate (Mexico City)
- First win: 2001 Harrah's 500 (Michigan)
- Last win: 2004 Grand Prix of Monterey (Laguna Seca)
Wins	Podiums	Poles
5	22	5
- Statistics up to date as of July 24, 2016.

Patrick Carpentier (born August 13, 1971) is a Canadian former professional auto racing driver. In the Champ Car World Series and the IndyCar Series, he achieved five wins and 24 podiums, as well as two third place championship finishes in 2002 and 2004. The long-time Champ Car driver switched to the IndyCar Series in 2005, and moved on to Grand-Am Road Racing in 2007. After a few NASCAR races in 2007, he moved full-time into the series in 2008. Since 2009, he has only had part-time drives, so became a contractor and renovator in Montreal, trading in real estate in Las Vegas, as well as being a color commentator for television coverage of various racing series. He last competed part-time in the NASCAR Sprint Cup Series, driving the No. 32 Ford Fusion for Go Fas Racing. Carpentier is now the president of a home construction firm in Quebec.

== Toyota Atlantic years ==
Carpentier started into Formula Ford 2000 Canada, before moving up to Player's Toyota Atlantic Championship in 1992. He joined Lynx Racing in 1995, whereby he won his first-ever race for the team around the streets of Bicentennial Park (Miami). He won again on the Nazareth Speedway oval, however the remainder of the season was marked by a variety of mechanical problems.

1996 was a whole different story. During the course of the Player's Toyota Atlantic Championship, he would shatter every record in the 25-year history of the championship, including nine wins out of twelve races – eight of them in a row, from pole position. He rewrote the record book for this series, setting a new record for the most consecutive wins(8), most wins in a season (9), also most consecutive wins from pole (eight), most laps led in a season and most accumulated points in a season (239). This included a flag-to-flag victory at the Grand Prix Molson du Canada meeting. After shattering Gilles Villeneuve's long standing records, his 1996 Atlantic season propelled him to the major league Indycar series.

== IndyCar career ==
After winning the 1996 Player's Toyota Atlantic Championship, Carpentier won a ride with Bettenhausen/Alumax team in CART, defeating several veteran racers from across the US and Europe, in a test held at Sebring. He debuted in CART in 1997 with Bettenhausen/Alumax team. In that first season, he was on pole at Nazareth, with a best finish was second at the inaugural race at Gateway, the Motorola 300. He would also be crowned "Rookie of the Year".

In 1998, Carpentier started driving for Player's Forsythe Racing, when the team expanded their operations to run a second alongside fellow Canadian, Greg Moore. At the end of the following season, with the unfortunate death of Moore, in season finale, the Marlboro 500 at Fontana, Carpentier became Forsythe's number one, when rookie Alex Tagliani was brought into the squad, keeping it an all-Canadian affair. In his early years he was prone to missing races through injuries, some of which originated off-track.

Carpentier's first Champ Car victory came in 2001 in the Harrah's 500, at the Michigan, and would finish tenth in the overall end of year standing. In what was the last CART sanctioned Michigan 500, he seized victory with a dramatic last-lap pass of Dario Franchitti. For Carpentier, this first CART win finally arrived in his 79th start. The following season, he would win twice, Marconi Grand Prix of Cleveland, and Grand Prix of Mid-Ohio and would take third in the championship standing. Carpentier was 5th overall in a disappointing 2003 season, despite winning the Grand Prix of Monterey, at the Laguna Seca (compared to title-winning teammate Paul Tracy).

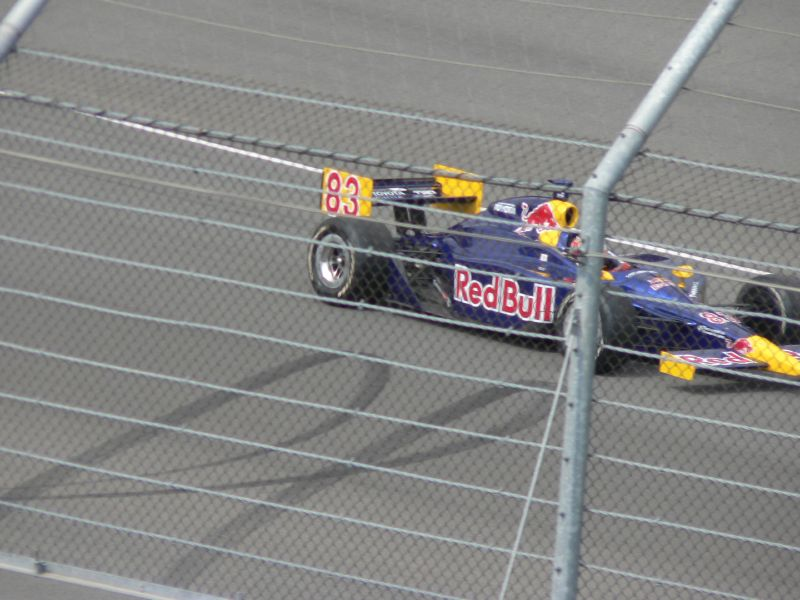
Carpentier at Mobility Resort Motegi

Tracy's performance weakened Carpentier's position within the team and rumours circulating pre-2004 season suggesting Carpentier would be dropped by Forsythe Racing, in favour of Rodolfo Lavín. Instead, Gerald Forsythe decided to run a third car for Lavin. Allegedly, Patrick kept his ride because of his marketing popularity in his homeland. He would repay Forsythe by retaining the Grand Prix of Monterey. Despite finishing higher than Paul Tracy in the 2004 championship, Carpentier left the team and the series for the 2005 season, joining Eddie Cheever's Cheever Racing in the IndyCar Series. Due to his excellent record on oval tracks he was expected to do well (most of the IndyCar Series races are on ovals which had become virtually extinct in Champ Car), but uncompetitive Toyota engines prevented any major success. He ended tenth in the standings with two third places and eleven top-tens out of seventeen races.

The 2005 season would be Carpentier's last in open-wheel competition. In a 2016 interview, he acknowledged he had decided to retire after seeing Ryan Briscoe's crash into the catchfence at the Chicagoland race; other major IRL crashes like the one suffered by Kenny Bräck in the 2003 finale at Texas also played a role in his decision. In his nine years as a competitor in CART and IRL's IndyCar, Carpentier finished 85 times in the top-ten, and stood on the podium 24 times.

== Sports car career ==
Shortly after the end of his IndyCar career, Carpentier drove a Crawford-Lexus DP03 for former boss Eddie Cheever in the 2006 Rolex 24 at Daytona. He then competed in the 2006 CASCAR Super Series event at Cayuga Speedway. Carpentier started 21st in the Dave Jacobs Racing car and finished sixth. From there he tried his hand at Grand-Am Road Racing, running a partial season with SAMAX Motorsport piloting their Riley Mk XI.

Carpentier re-signed for another season with SAMAX, to drive a Daytona Prototype in the 2007 Grand-Am Rolex Sports Car Series, alongside either Milka Duno or Ryan Dalziel. The highlight of this partnership was their second place in the Rolex 24 at Daytona. The trio also shared their Riley-Pontiac Mk XI with another British driver, Darren Manning. They finished on the same lap as the winner, just 75.845 seconds behind after 24 hours of racing, leading for 121 of the 668 laps. Carpentier last race for SAMAX was the 400 km Montreal, where he finished tenth, partnered by Kris Szekeres, took place on August 3, 2007. He later left SAMAX to pursue a career in NASCAR, with his first race (the NAPA Auto Parts 200) the next day.

== Stock car career ==
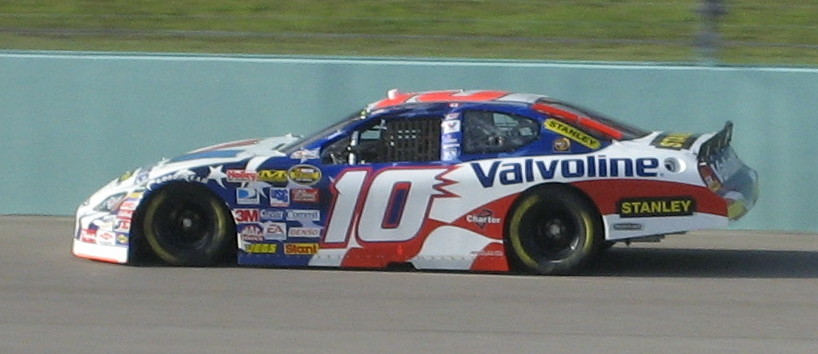
Patrick Carpentier at Homestead

Carpentier made his debut in the NASCAR Busch Series at Montreal's Circuit Gilles Villeneuve on August 4, 2007, taking pole in qualifying and finished the controversial race in 2nd place, behind Kevin Harvick, while Robby Gordon was disqualified by NASCAR from his first place spot for intentionally wrecking Marcos Ambrose and ignoring a resulting penalty. Carpentier would return to Montreal to post another second place in 2008. Carpentier made his NASCAR Nextel Cup debut on August 12, 2007, at Watkins Glen, in the Gillett Evernham Motorsports #10 Valvoline/Stanley Tools-sponsored Dodge, replacing Scott Riggs and started fortieth. Carpentier led for seven laps in the race near the midway portion of the race and wound up finishing in the twentieth position. In October 2007, it was announced he would drive the #10 car full-time in 2008.

On February 14, 2008, Carpentier attempted to qualify for the 2008 Daytona 500 in the second of two Gatorade Duels. Carpentier ran in the top-ten for most of the day. Late in the race, his right front tire blew, sending him into the backstretch wall. Carpentier was running in third place of the drivers not locked into the Daytona 500 based on owner points.

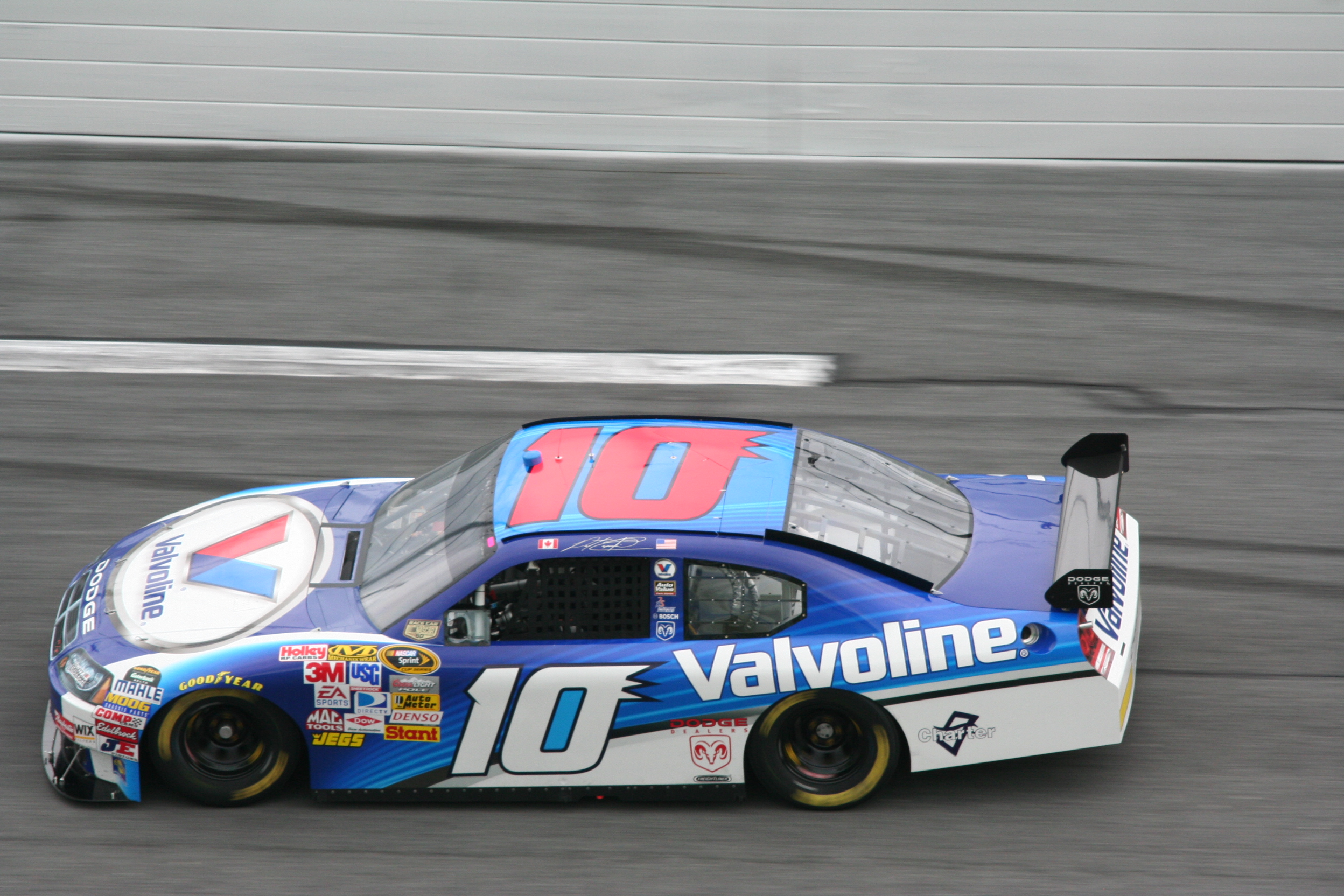
2008 Sprint Cup racecar

Carpentier had not seen New Hampshire before visiting for track for the 2008 Lenox Industrial Tools 301. On June 27, 2008, in just his 17th NASCAR race, he became only the second non-American driver to qualify on pole. He was the first by a foreign born in NASCAR's top division since Lloyd Shaw (from Toronto, Ontario, Canada) won the pole at Langhorne Speedway in June 1953. Come race day, he didn't give up the lead easily as he led the first four laps. "That was a heck of a thrill," Carpentier said after the race. "Winning the pole on Friday was certainly a highlight of my career. But leading those laps was unbelievable. It's hard to put into words." He would later be hit by brakes problems and would finish down in 31st place.

On July 5, 2008, Carpentier earned his best career Sprint Cup finish by finishing fourteenth in the Coke Zero 400.

On August 30, 2008, Carpentier announced that he would be a free agent for the 2009 Sprint Cup Series, leaving Gillett Evernham Motorsports. Four days prior to Carpentier's announcement Gillett Evernham Motorsports had announced that they would hire driver Reed Sorenson for 2009 making Carpentier's future uncertain. On October 7, Carpentier was released by GEM. Former Team Red Bull driver A. J. Allmendinger finished out the year.

On June 9, 2009, Michael Waltrip Racing announced that Carpentier would replace team owner, Michael Waltrip in the No. 55 NAPA-sponsored Toyota for the two road course races on the 2009 Sprint Cup schedule: Sonoma on June 21 and Watkins Glen on August 9. Carpentier competed in a number of races for Tommy Baldwin Racing in events that conflict with Mike Skinner's truck series schedule.

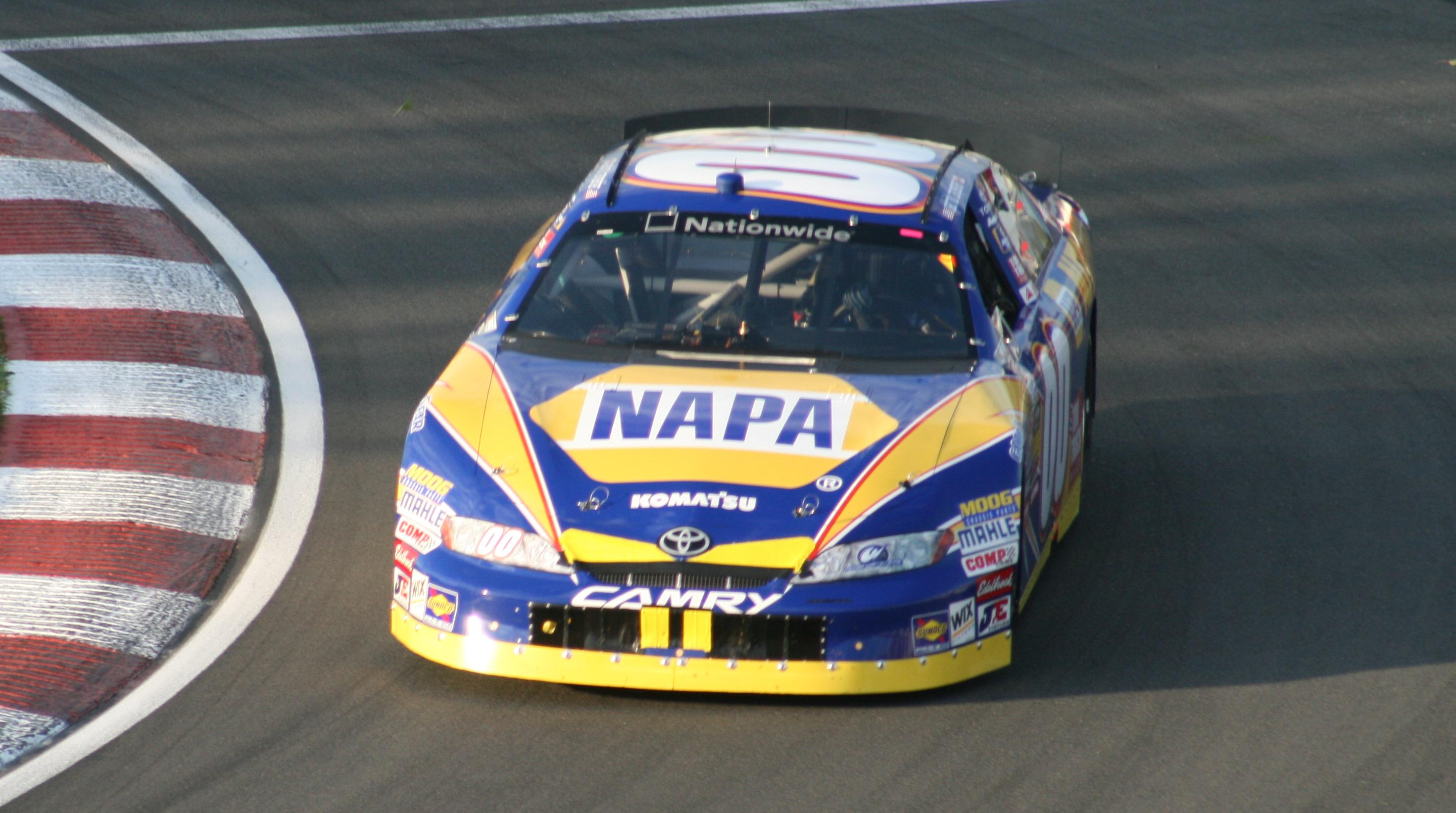
Carpentier in the qualification for the 2010 NAPA Auto Parts 200 at the Circuit Gilles Villeneuve in Montreal

In 2010, Carpentier ran a number of races for Latitude 43 Motorsports. In 2011, Carpentier returned to his open-wheel roots, attempting to qualify for the 95th Indianapolis 500 for Dragon Racing after former Red Bull driver Scott Speed was unable to get the car up to speed on bump day. Carpentier was unable to get the car in the race. On the stock car side, Carpentier drove a few Sprint Cup races for Frank Stoddard's team. On June 7, Carpentier announced to the Toronto Sun that he would officially retire from racing after the NAPA Auto Parts 200 at Circuit Gilles Villeneuve, where he drove for Pastrana-Waltrip Racing.

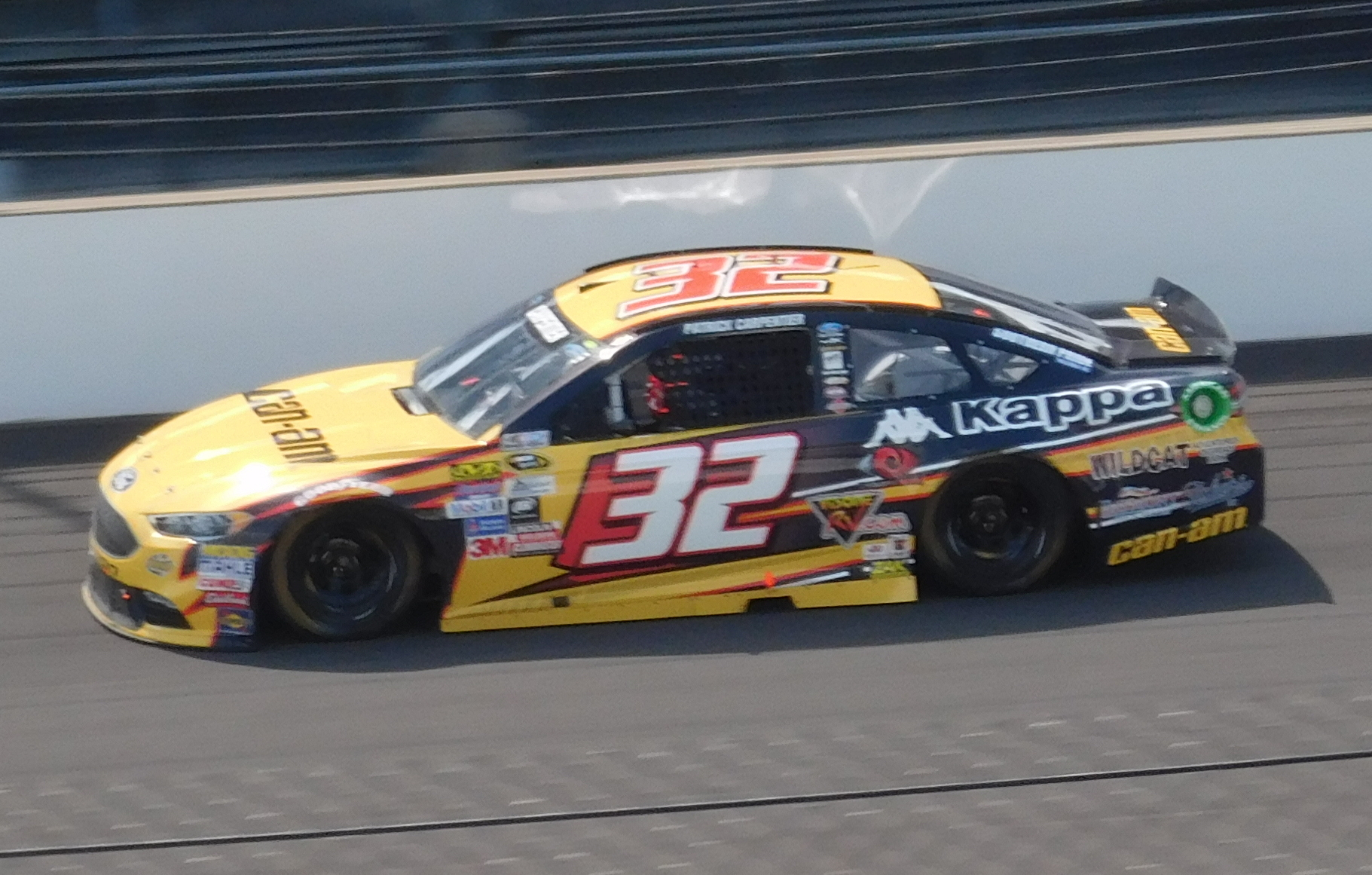
Carpentier's No. 32 car at Indianapolis Motor Speedway in 2016

On April 22, 2016, Carpentier announced he would return to the Cup Series starting with the Toyota/Save Mart 350 at Sonoma, followed by also competing in the Brickyard 400 at Indy for Go Fas Racing. Piloting the No.32 Can-Am Kappa, Cyclops Ford Fusion Carpentier was the only road course ringer in the race at Sonoma. A promising day went wrong when Carpentier blew a tire while running eleventh with less than fifteen laps to go, resulting in a 37th-place finish. Carpentier would steal the headlines during practice for the Brickyard 400 when he got into an accident with Kyle Busch. Carpentier would finish 34th in the race, his best finish of the season.

== Retirement ==
On August 20, 2011, Carpentier announced his retirement shortly before the Nationwide race in Montreal. While running fourth, contact with Steven Wallace took him out of the race and he left to a standing ovation from the crowd.

Despite his retirement, Carpentier stated in January 2012 that he would be willing to compete in the Montreal Nationwide Series race in 2012, to raise money for children's charities. After starting thirteenth, Carpentier finished 29th.

In 2013, after spending time trying to stay away from racing, Carpentier joined the French-language sports channel RDS, as a colour commentator for their NASCAR broadcasts. After retiring from full-time racing in 2008, he said that he “tried other things but I need to be around racing. Everything has been very different since I stopped racing and I have been trying to come to grips with it.” Prior to this, Carpentier was in the home renovation business, buying and selling real estate in Nevada, where he lived whilst an active racer. As the economic downturn hit the Las Vegas region hard and real estate prices started to sag, this made life difficult for him, so when RDS contacted him, he took up their offer.

When in August 2014, the inaugural World Rallycross Championship hit the classic Canadian street venue, Circuit Trois-Rivières, the seventh round of the season. Carpentier was the chance to make his rallycross debut with the Volkswagen Marklund Motorsport outfit. Despite his lack of experience of Rallycross cars, he raced through the heats, qualifying for the Final. At the start of the final, Carpentier slotted his Volkswagen Polo in fourth place behind Timur Timerzyanov. He was the first driver to take his joker lap, but spun at the end of the second lap, putting him out of contention for a podium finish. By lap four, much to the dismay of the crowd, Carpentier crashed out, leaving him classified sixth overall in the first ever World RX of Canada event. The event was won by Petter Solberg, from Anton Marklund. Carpentier raced a JRM Racing Mini Countryman in the 2015 World RX of Canada, this time finishing fourteenth overall and failing to reach the semi-finals.

Carpentier was inducted into the Canadian Motorsport Hall of Fame in 2021.

== Broadcasting career ==
Carpentier has become a TV broadcast commentator for motorsports on Réseau des sports, the French-language version of TSN.

== Racing record ==
=== Career highlights ===
Season	Series	Position	Team	Car
1990	Formula Ford 2000 Canada	13th		Reynard-Ford 88SF
1992	SCCA Toyota Atlantic Championship	11th		Swift-Toyota DB4
1993	Player's Toyota Atlantic Championship	27th		Reynard-Toyota 93H
1994	Player's Toyota Atlantic Championship	9th		Ralt-Toyota RT40
1992	SCCA Toyota Atlantic Championship	11th		Swift-Toyota DB4
1994	PPG/Firestone Indy Lights Championship	20th	Canaska	Lola-Buick T93/20
1995	Player's Toyota Atlantic Championship	3rd	Lynx Racing	Ralt-Toyota RT41
1996	Player's Toyota Atlantic Championship	**1st**	Lynx Racing	Ralt-Toyota RT41
1997	PPG CART World Series	17th	Bettenhausen Racing	Reynard-Mercedes-Benz 97i
1998	FedEx Championship Series	19th	Forsythe Racing	Reynard-Mercedes-Benz 98i
1999	FedEx Championship Series	13th	Forsythe Racing	Reynard-Mercedes 99i
2000	FedEx Championship Series	13th	Forsythe Racing	Reynard-Ford 2KI
2001	FedEx Championship Series	10th	Forsythe Racing	Reynard-Ford 01i
2002	FedEx Championship Series	3rd	Team Player's	Reynard-Ford 02i
2003	Bridgestone Presents the Champ Car World Series Powered by Ford	5th	Team Player's	Lola-Ford B02/00
2004	Bridgestone Presents the Champ Car World Series Powered by Ford	3rd	Forsythe Championship Racing	Lola-Ford B02/00
2005	IRL IndyCar Series	10th	Cheever Racing	Dallara-Toyota IR5
2005-06	A1 Grand Prix of Nations	11th	A1 Team Canada	Lola-Zytek B05/52
2006	CASCAR Super Series	34th	CPS Flooring	Ford Taurus
2006	Grand-Am Rolex Sports Car Series presented by Crown Royal Special Reserve	76th	Cheever Racing; CITGO Racing by SAMAX	Crawford-Lexus DP03; Riley-Pontiac Mk XI
2007	Grand-Am Rolex Sports Car Series presented by Crown Royal Special Reserve	35th	SAMAX Motorsport	Riley-Pontiac Mk XI
2007	NASCAR Nextel Cup Series	57th	Valvoline Evernham Racing	Dodge Charger LX
2007	NASCAR Busch Series	93rd	Evernham Motorsports	Dodge Charger
2008	NASCAR Sprint Cup Series	38th	Gillett Evernham Racing	Dodge Charger
2008	NASCAR Nationwide Series	50th	Gillett Evernham Racing	Dodge Charger LX
2008	NASCAR Craftsman Truck Series	89th	Bobby Hamilton Racing-Virginia	Dodge Ram
2009	NASCAR Sprint Cup Series	50th	Michael Waltrip Racing	Toyota Camry
2009	NASCAR Nationwide Series	108th	Michael Waltrip Racing	Toyota Camry
2010	NASCAR Sprint Cup Series	50th	Latitude 43 Motorsports	Ford Fusion
2010	NASCAR Nationwide Series	131st	Diamond-Waltrip Racing	Toyota Camry
2011	NASCAR Sprint Cup Series	66th	FAS Lane Racing	Ford Fusion
2011	NASCAR Nationwide Series	82nd	Pastrana-Waltrip Racing	Toyota Camry
2012	NASCAR Nationwide Series	88th	RAB Racing with Brack Maggard	Toyota Camry
2014	FIA World Rallycross Championship presented by Monster Energy	31st	Volkswagen Marklund Motorsport	Volkswagen Polo

=== Complete 24 Hours of Daytona results ===
Year	Team	Co-drivers	Car	Class	Laps	Pos.	Class Pos.
2006	(United States) Cheever Racing	(Brazil) Christian Fittipaldi (United States) Eddie Cheever	Crawford-Lexus DP03	DP	669	DNF	DNF
2007	(United States) SAMAX Motorsport	(Venezuela) Milka Duno (United Kingdom) Darren Manning (United Kingdom) Ryan Dalziel	Riley-Pontiac Mk XI	DP	668	2nd	2nd

=== American open–wheel racing results ===
(key) (Races in bold indicate pole position) (Races in italics indicate fastest lap)

==== Indy Lights ====
Year	Team	1	2	3	4	5	6	7	8	9	10	11	12	Rank	Points
1994	Canaska Racing	PHX	LBH	MIL	DET	POR	CLE	TOR; 20	MDO; 6	NHA	VAN	NAZ	LS	**21st**	**8**

==== CART/Champ Car ====
Champ Car results
Year	Team	No.	1	2	3	4	5	6	7	8	9	10	11	12	13	14	15	16	17	18	19	20	21	Rank	Points	Ref
1997	Bettenhausen Racing	16	MIA; 9	SRF; 15	LBH; 15	NZR; 12	RIO; 28	GAT; 2	MIL; 8	DET; 15	POR; 16	CLE; 12	TOR; 16	MIS; 15	MDO; 15	ROA; 27	VAN; Inj	LS; Inj	FON; DNS					17th	27	
1998	Forsythe Racing	33	MIA; 11	MOT; 19	LBH; 28	**NZR**; 13	RIO; 17	GAT; 15	**MIL**; 25	DET; 15	POR; 9	CLE; 9	TOR; 25	MIS; 8	MDO; 7	ROA; 28	VAN; 27	LS; 17	HOU; 22	SRF; 9	FON; 26			19th	27	
1999	Forsythe Racing	33	MIA; 7	MOT; 26	LBH; 17	NZR; 14	RIO; 6	GAT; 22	MIL; 9	POR; 9	CLE; 7	ROA; 22	TOR; 11	MIS; 10	DET; 23	MDO; Inj	CHI; 6	VAN; 2	LS; 9	HOU; 19	SRF; 24	FON; 25		13th	61	
2000	Forsythe Racing	32	MIA; 5	LBH; Inj	RIO; Inj	MOT; Inj	NZR; 21	MIL; 3	DET; 5	POR; 10	CLE; 5	TOR; 7	MIS; 4	CHI; 14	MDO; 7	ROA; 21	VAN; 24	LS; 9	GAT; 2	HOU; 19	SRF; 5	FON; 14		11th	101	
2001	Forsythe Racing	32	MTY; 25	LBH; 23	TEX; C	NAZ; 25	MOT; 19	MIL; 17	DET; 8	POR; 5	CLE; 26	TOR; 21	MIS; 1	CHI; 2	MDO; 3	ROA; 9	VAN; 16	LAU; 3	ROC; 16	HOU; 10	LS; 26	SRF; 11	FON; 10	10th	91	
2002	Forsythe Racing	32	MTY; 7	LBH; 19	MOT; 4	MIL; 15	LS; 5	POR; 5	CHI; 16	TOR; 10	CLE; 1	VAN; 5	**MDO**; 1	ROA; 7	MTL; 15	DEN; 17	ROC; 3	MIA; 16	SRF; 2	FON; 3	MXC; 4			3rd	157	
2003	Forsythe Racing	32	STP; 8	MTY; 8	LBH; 6	BRH; 5	LAU; 7	MIL; 3	**LS**; 1	POR; 16	CLE; 4	TOR; 7	VAN; 13	ROA; 5	MDO; 2	MTL; 3	DEN; 17	MIA; 6	MXC; 14	SRF; 5	FON; C			5th	146	
2004	Forsythe Racing	7	LBH; 4	MTY; 4	MIL; 2	POR; 4	CLE; 16	TOR; 3	VAN; 16	ROA; 14	DEN; 9	MTL; 2	LS; 1	**LVS**; 3	SRF; 16	MXC; 6								3rd	266^	

- ^ New points system introduced in 2004.

==== IndyCar ====
IndyCar Series results
Year	Team	No.	Chassis	Engine	1	2	3	4	5	6	7	8	9	10	11	12	13	14	15	16	17	18	Rank	Points	Ref
2005	Cheever Racing	83	Dallara	Toyota	HMS; 7	PHX; 9	STP; 8	MOT; 13	INDY; 21	TXS; 16	RIR; 3	KAN; 14	NSH; 3	MIL; 7	MIS; 9	KTY; 12	PPIR; 10	SNM; 4	CHI; 9	WGL; 10	FON; 15		10th	376	
2011	Dragon Racing	20	Dallara	Honda	STP	ALA	LBH	SAO	INDY; DNQ	TXS1	TXS2	MIL	IOW	TOR	EDM	MDO	NHM	SNM	BAL	MOT	KTY	LVS^{3} C	NC	-	

^{1} The Las Vegas Indy 300 was abandoned after Dan Wheldon died from injuries sustained in a 15-car crash on lap 11.

==== Indianapolis 500 ====
Year	Chassis	Engine	Start	Finish	Team
2005	Dallara	Toyota	25	21	Cheever Racing
2011	Dallara	Honda	DNQ		Dragon Racing

=== International open-wheel racing ===
==== A1 Grand Prix ====
(Races in bold indicate pole position) (Races in italics indicate fastest lap)

A1 Grand Prix results
Year	Entrant	1	2	3	4	5	6	7	8	9	10	11	12	13	14	15	16	17	18	19	20	21	22	DC	Points
2005-06	Canada	GBR; SPR	GBR; FEA	GER; SPR	GER; FEA	POR; SPR	POR; FEA	AUS; SPR	AUS; FEA	MYS; SPR	MYS; FEA	UAE; SPR	UAE; FEA	RSA; SPR	RSA; FEA	IDN; SPR	IDN; FEA	MEX; SPR; 9	MEX; FEA; 15	USA; SPR; 6	USA; FEA; 5	CHN; SPR; Ret	CHN; FEA; 7	11th	59

=== NASCAR ===
(key) (Bold – Pole position awarded by qualifying time. Italics – Pole position earned by points standings or practice time. * – Most laps led.)

==== Sprint Cup Series ====
NASCAR Sprint Cup Series results
Year	Team	No.	Make	1	2	3	4	5	6	7	8	9	10	11	12	13	14	15	16	17	18	19	20	21	22	23	24	25	26	27	28	29	30	31	32	33	34	35	36	NSCC	Pts	Ref
2007	Gillett Evernham Motorsports	10	Dodge	DAY	CAL	LVS	ATL	BRI	MAR	TEX	PHO	TAL	RCH	DAR	CLT	DOV	POC	MCH	SON	NHA	DAY	CHI	IND	POC	GLN; 22	MCH	BRI	CAL	RCH	NHA	DOV	KAN	TAL	CLT	MAR	ATL	TEX	PHO; 33	HOM; 40	57th	209	
2008	Gillett Evernham Motorsports	10	Dodge	DAY; DNQ	CAL; DNQ	LVS; 40	ATL; 35	BRI; DNQ	MAR; 29	TEX; 28	PHO; 33	TAL; 31	RCH; 43	DAR; 40	CLT; 37	DOV; 29	POC; 32	MCH; 24	SON; 23	**NHA**; 31	DAY; 14	CHI; 30	IND; 18	POC	GLN; 20	MCH; 30	BRI; DNQ	CAL; 18	RCH; 25	NHA; 31	DOV; 41	KAN; 29	TAL; DNQ	CLT	MAR	ATL	TEX	PHO	HOM	38th	1794	
2009	Tommy Baldwin Racing	36	Toyota	DAY	CAL	LVS	ATL	BRI	MAR	TEX	PHO	TAL	RCH	DAR	CLT	DOV	POC; 43	MCH		NHA; 43	DAY; 42	CHI	IND	POC; 37				ATL; DNQ	RCH	NHA	DOV	KAN	CAL	CLT	MAR	TAL	TEX	PHO	HOM	50th	351	
2009	Michael Waltrip Racing	55	Toyota																SON; 11						GLN; 33	MCH	BRI													50th	351	
2010	Latitude 43 Motorsports	26	Ford	DAY	CAL	LVS	ATL	BRI	MAR	PHO	TEX	TAL	RCH	DAR	DOV	CLT	POC	MCH	SON	NHA	DAY	CHI	IND	POC	GLN; 21	MCH; 29	BRI	ATL; 28	RCH	NHA	DOV	KAN; 27	CAL; DNQ	CLT; 37	MAR	TAL	TEX; 31	PHO	HOM; DNQ	50th	474	
2011	FAS Lane Racing	32	Ford	DAY	PHO	LVS	BRI	CAL	MAR	TEX	TAL	RCH	DAR	DOV	CLT	KAN; 30	POC	MCH	SON	DAY	KEN	NHA	IND	POC	GLN	MCH	BRI	ATL	RCH	CHI	NHA	DOV	KAN	CLT	TAL	MAR	TEX	PHO	HOM	66th	0^{1}	
2016	Go FAS Racing	32	Ford	DAY	ATL	LVS	PHO	CAL	MAR	TEX	BRI	RCH	TAL	KAN	DOV	CLT	POC	MCH	SON; 37	DAY	KEN	NHA	IND; 34	POC	GLN	BRI	MCH	DAR	RCH	CHI	NHA	DOV	CLT	KAN	TAL	MAR	TEX	PHO	HOM	47th	11	

===== Daytona 500 =====
Year	Team	Manufacturer	Start	Finish
2008	Gillett Evernham Motorsports	Dodge	DNQ	

==== Nationwide Series ====
NASCAR Nationwide Series results
Year	Team	No.	Make	1	2	3	4	5	6	7	8	9	10	11	12	13	14	15	16	17	18	19	20	21	22	23	24	25	26	27	28	29	30	31	32	33	34	35	NNSC	Pts	Ref
2007	FitzBradshaw Racing	22	Chevy	DAY	CAL	MXC	LVS	ATL	BRI	NSH	TEX	PHO	TAL	RCH	DAR	CLT	DOV	NSH	KEN	MLW	NHA	DAY	CHI	GTY	IRP	**CGV**; 2	GLN; 19	MCH	BRI	CAL	RCH	DOV	KAN	CLT	MEM	TEX	PHO		93rd	293	
2007	Gillett Evernham Motorsports	19	Dodge																																			HOM; 42	93rd	293	
2008	Gillett Evernham Motorsports	9	Dodge	DAY	CAL	LVS; 8	ATL	BRI	NSH	TEX	PHO	MXC; 5	TAL; 8	RCH	DAR	CLT	DOV	NSH	KEN	MLW	NHA; 18	DAY	CHI	GTY	IRP	CGV; 2	GLN; 22	MCH; 33	BRI	CAL	RCH	DOV; 20	KAN	CLT	MEM	TEX	PHO	HOM	50th	987	
2009	SK Motorsports	07	Toyota	DAY	CAL	LVS	BRI	TEX	NSH	PHO	TAL	RCH	DAR; 17	CLT	DOV	NSH	KEN	MLW	NHA	DAY	CHI	GTY	IRP	IOW	GLN	MCH	BRI												108th	161	
2009	Michael Waltrip Racing	99	Toyota																									CGV; 38	ATL	RCH	DOV	KAN	CAL	CLT	MEM	TEX	PHO	HOM	108th	161	
2010	Diamond-Waltrip Racing	00	Toyota	DAY	CAL	LVS	BRI	NSH	PHO	TEX	TAL	RCH	DAR	DOV	CLT	NSH	KEN	ROA	NHA	DAY	CHI	GTY	IRP	IOW	GLN	MCH	BRI	CGV; 32	ATL	RCH	DOV	KAN	CAL	CLT	GTY	TEX	PHO	HOM	131st	67	
2011	Pastrana-Waltrip Racing	99	Toyota	DAY	PHO	LVS	BRI	CAL	TEX	TAL	NSH	RCH	DAR	DOV	IOW	CLT	CHI	MCH	ROA	DAY	KEN	NHA	NSH	IRP	IOW	GLN	CGV; 32	BRI	ATL	RCH	CHI	DOV	KAN	CLT	TEX	PHO	HOM		82nd	12	
2012	RAB Racing	99	Toyota	DAY	PHO	LVS	BRI	CAL	TEX	RCH	TAL	DAR	IOW	CLT	DOV	MCH	ROA	KEN	DAY	NHA	CHI	IND	IOW	GLN	CGV; 29	BRI	ATL	RCH	CHI	KEN	DOV	CLT	KAN	TEX	PHO	HOM			88th	15	

==== Craftsman Truck Series ====
NASCAR Craftsman Truck Series results
Year	Team	No.	Make	1	2	3	4	5	6	7	8	9	10	11	12	13	14	15	16	17	18	19	20	21	22	23	24	25	NCTC	Pts	Ref
2008	Bobby Hamilton Racing	04	Dodge	DAY	CAL	ATL	MAR	KAN	CLT	MFD	DOV	TEX	MCH	MLW	MEM	KEN	IRP	NSH	BRI; 25	GTY	NHA	LVS	TAL	MAR	ATL	TEX	PHO	HOM	89th	88	

=== Complete FIA World Rallycross Championship results ===
==== Supercar ====
Year	Entrant	Car	1	2	3	4	5	6	7	8	9	10	11	12	13	Position	Points
2014	Marklund Motorsport	Volkswagen Polo R	POR	GBR	NOR	FIN	SWE	BEL	CAN; 6	FRA	GER	ITA	TUR	ARG		30th	13
2015	JRM Racing	Mini Countryman RX	POR	HOC	BEL	GBR	GER	SWE	CAN; 14	NOR	FRA	ESP	TUR	ITA	ARG	29th	3

== See also ==
- List of Canadians in Champ Car
- List of Canadians in NASCAR

Sporting positions
Preceded by Richie Hearn	Toyota Atlantics Champion; 1996	Succeeded by Alex Barron
Preceded by Alex Zanardi	CART Rookie of the Year; 1997	Succeeded by Tony Kanaan
