= Circuit Riverside Speedway Ste-Croix =

Motorsport venue in Quebec, Canada

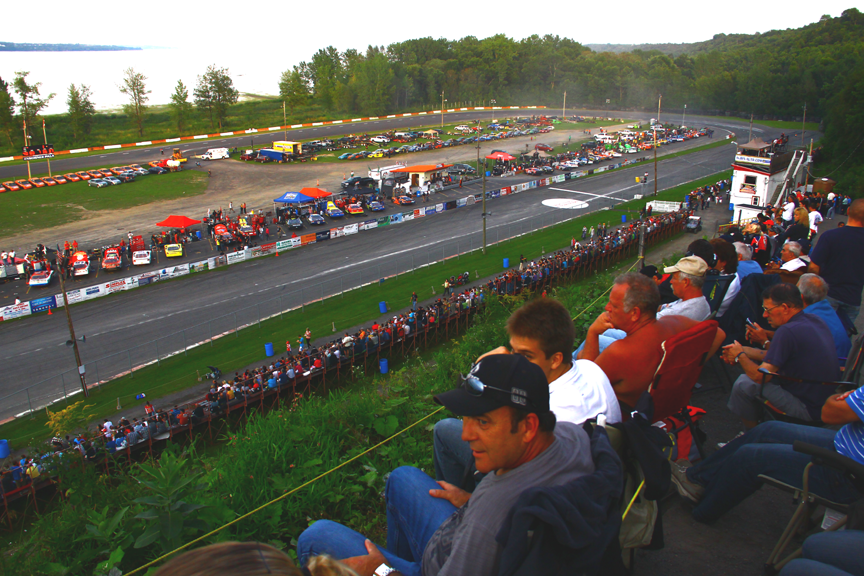
- Location: Route 132, Sainte-Croix, Québec
- Coordinates: 46°37′55″N 71°47′17″W
- Capacity: 5,000
- Owner: Jean and Guillaume Bergeron
- Opened: 1971
- Former names: Circuit Ste-Croix, Circuit Québec Ste-Croix
- Major events: Série ACT (Present) Pirelli World Challenge (2000) CASCAR Super Series (1996-1999)
- Website: http://riverside-speedway.ca/cms/

Oval
- Surface: Asphalt
- Length: 0.9 km (0.56 mi)
- Turns: 4

Road course
- Surface: Asphalt
- Length: 1.7 km (1.1 mi)
- Turns: 9

The Circuit Riverside Speedway Ste-Croix is a multi-track motorsport venue located in Sainte-Croix, Quebec (Canada), approximatively 60 km west of Quebec City, on the south shore of the St. Lawrence River. The facility features a 5/8-mile length oval speedway and a 1,7 km 9-turn road course.

The configuration of the oval track, long straights with tight curves, reminiscent of the famous Martinsville Speedway in Virginia.

The track opened in 1971 but closed just three years later in 1974 due to financial problems. The oval track was relaunched in 1985 thanks to a new promoter. The track hosted many races of the American Canadian Tour series, whether the ACT Pro Stock Tour, the ACT Late Model Tour or Quebec's Série ACT.

The original road course was of 2.5 km length, using the oval track and climbing the hill near Route 132. A new shorter road course (1.7 km) was laid out in 2000, still using the oval track.
