= Chris Smith (racing driver) =

American racing driver

- Born: September 4, 1966 (age 60) Palos Verdes Estates, California, U.S.
- Retired: 1997

SCCA Toyota Atlantic Series
- Years active: 1991-1993, 1995-1997
- Teams: Intercar Motorsports; PPI Motorsports
- Starts: 37
- Wins: 3
- Poles: 4
- Best finish: 1st in 1992

Previous series
- 1994: Indy Lights

Championship titles
- 1992: Toyota Atlantic Championship

Christopher Smith (born September 4, 1966) is an American former racing driver from Palos Verdes Estates, California. He competed in the Toyota Atlantic series beginning in 1991 and captured three wins on his way to the 1992 championship, he was unable to move up the ladder the following year though and only competed in a single Atlantics race that year. He found a ride in Indy Lights in 1994, in eight starts, Smith only managed a best finish of eighth place and finished a disappointing 19th in series points. After his Indy Lights experience, Smith participated in a single Indy Lights race in 1995 and partial Atlantics seasons in 1995, 1996, and 1997 with few notable results.

Sporting positions
Preceded by Jovy Marcelo	Toyota Atlantic Champion; 1992	Succeeded by David Empringham
