= Matt Plumb =

American racing driver

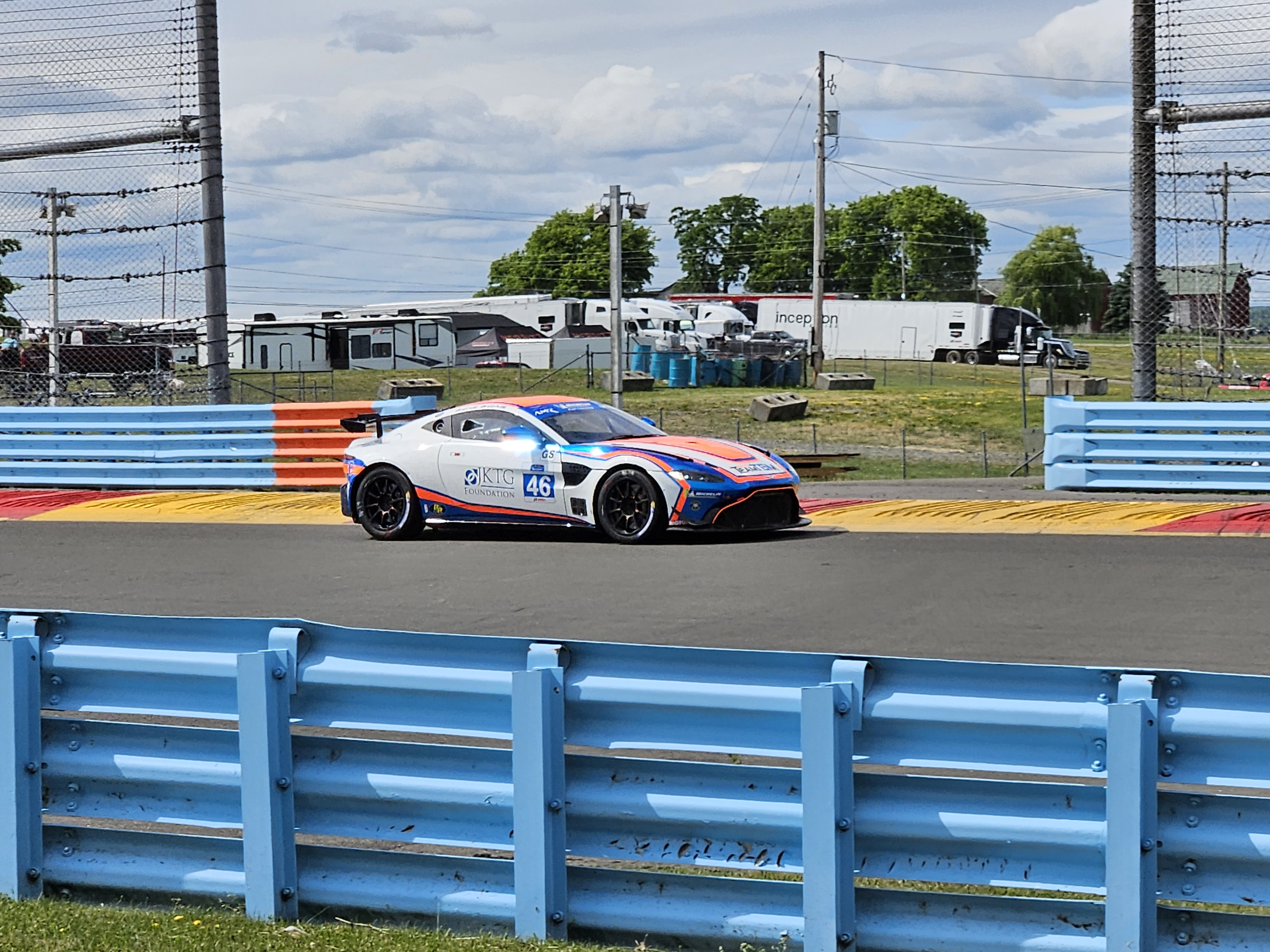
- Nationality: (United States) American
- Born: J. Mathieu Plumb; July 8, 1974 (age 52) Providence, Rhode Island, U.S.
- Relatives: Michael Plumb (father); Donnan Sharp (mother); Hugh Plumb (brother)
- Categorisation: FIA Silver

Previous series
- 2010-2014 2002-2009 1998-2001 1997-98: Continental Tire Sports Car Challenge; Rolex Sports Car Series; Barber Dodge Pro Series; Skip Barber Formula Dodge Southern Race Series

Championship titles
- 2011 1997-98: Continental Tire Sports Car Challenge; Skip Barber Formula Dodge Southern Race Series

Awards
- 2014 2003: Road Racing Drivers Club member SPEED Touring Car Championship Rookie of the Year

Matt Plumb (born 8 July 1974) is a racing driver who has previously competed in the Barber Dodge Pro Series and currently races in the Continental Tire Sports Car Challenge. He is also team manager of Rum Bum Racing, a sportscar and GT racing team.

== Career ==
Matt Plumb was born on 8 July 1974 to Michael Plumb and Donnan Sharp. His father was a former Olympic equestrian rider and United States Olympic Hall of Fame inductee. His mother competed in the 1968 Summer Olympics. After his bachelor study in history and economics at the University of Virginia and a short career in finance at Donaldson, Lufkin & Jenrette, he pursued a career in auto racing.

Plumb started his racing career in the 1997-98 Skip Barber Formula Dodge Southern Race Series. He won his first race ever at Sebring International Raceway. Plumb dominated the series and won ten races in total. Plumb won the championship over Pete Boss and Giandomenico Brusatin, he was also nominated for the Big Scholarship runoffs. In 1998, Plumb also competed in three Barber Dodge Pro Series races, which was the maximum for a Big Scholarship nominee. Plumb scored two top ten finishes at Homestead-Miami Speedway and Mazda Raceway Laguna Seca. Despite not winning the Big Scholarship, Plumb secured a full-time drive in the 1999 Barber Dodge Pro Series season.

Plumb had a tough start in the 1999 season, he only finished in the top-ten once in the first five races. However towards the end of the season, he grabbed his first professional podium finish. At Homestead-Miami Speedway, Plumb came in third, behind Todd Snyder and Jon Fogarty. Plumb significantly improved for the 2000 Barber Dodge Pro Series season. After consistent top-ten finishes, he won his first Barber Dodge Pro Series race. At Vancouver, Plumb won the first ever Barber Dodge Pro Series race not ran in the United States of America. 2001 was his fourth and final year in the Barber Dodge Pro Series. This proved also to be his most successful. After a rough start with two retirements, Plumb won races at Detroit and Laguna Seca. Scoring another four podium finishes, Plumb finished third in the standings equal in points to Sepp Koster. As Koster had more wins than Plumb, the Dutchman was awarded second place in the standings.

In 2002, Plumb made his debut in the 24 Hours of Daytona. Plumb finished sixteenth overall in his Seikel Motorsport entered Porsche 996 GT3-RS For 2003 Plumb returned to full-time racing. He made his debut in the SPEED Touring Car Championship in a BMW 325. At Lime Rock Park Plumb finished second behind Pierre Kleinubing. Plumb won the SPEED Touring Car Championship Rookie of the Year title. The following season, Plumb switched to an Acura TSX and returned in the series. At Mid-Ohio and Mosport, Plumb finished first. He eventually finished third in the standings.

For 2005, Plumb joined JMB Racing to race in the Rolex Sports Car Series GT class. Racing the Ferrari 360 Modena was not a success. The team's best result was at the 250 mile race at Homestead-Miami Speedway. The team finished 28th overall, tenth in class. For 2006, Plumb joined his brother Hugh at Bill Fenton Motorsports in the Grand-Am Cup. The combination was a success. The two brothers won races at Barber Motorsports Park and Virginia International Raceway. The duo ended up runners-up in the championship standings and helped Acura win the manufacturers championship. The following years, Plumb continued to run a partial schedule in the Grand-Am Cup/KONI Challenge Series with reasonable success. In 2009, Plumb joined Rum Bum Racing LLC as a driver and team manager. In their inaugural Continental Tire Sports Car Championship, the team finished fifth in the GS class. Plumb continued to be a front runner in the series. In 2011, Plumb won three races and finished third in the championship. In 2012, Plumb and co-driver Nick Longhi won the prestigious championship. The duo won three races and scored an additional four podium finishes.

In 2014, Plumb was voted into the Road Racing Drivers Club.

== Complete motorsports results ==
=== American Open-Wheel racing results ===
(key) (Races in bold indicate pole position, races in italics indicate fastest race lap)

==== Barber Dodge Pro Series ====
Year	1	2	3	4	5	6	7	8	9	10	11	12	Rank	Points
1998	SEB	LRP	DET	WGI	CLE	GRA	MOH	ROA; 26	LS1	ATL	HMS; 7	LS2; 9	**25th**	**16**
1999	SEB; 12	NAZ; 11	LRP; 11	POR; 7	CLE; 14	ROA; 8	DET; 7	MOH; 22	GRA; 14	LS; 24	HMS; 3	WGI; 9	**12th**	**65**
2000	SEB; 6	MIA; 4	NAZ; 8	LRP; 22	DET; 2	CLE; 6	MOH; 7	ROA; 26	VAN; 1	LS; 26	RAT; 2	HMS; 5	**4th**	**112**
2001	SEB; 20	PIR; 21	LRP1; 2	LRP2; 6	**DET**; 1	CLE; 2	**TOR**; 3	CHI; 5	**MOH**; 2	ROA; 6	VAN; 5	**LS**; 1	**3rd**	**151**

=== 24 Hours of Daytona ===
24 Hours of Daytona results
Year	Class	No	Team	Car	Co-drivers	Laps	Position	Class Pos.
2002	GT	39	(United States) Autosport Race Team	Porsche 996 GT3-RS	(United States) Tom Papadopoulos (United States) David Friedman	301	51 ^{DNF}	23 ^{DNF}
2005	GT	11	(United States) JMB Racing	Ferrari 360 Modena	(United States) Peter Boss (United States) Jim Michaelian (United Kingdom) David Gooding	623	25	11
2007	GT	69	(United States) Speedsource	Mazda RX-8	(United States) Emil Assentato (United States) Nick Longhi (United States) Jeff Segal	612	19	7
2008	DP	7	(United States) Sigalsport	Riley Mk. XI (BMW)	(United States) Quentin Wahl (France) Stephan Gregoire (Republic of Ireland) Michael Cullen (Republic of Ireland) Paddy Shovlin	601	28	14
2009	GT	69	(United States) Speedsource	Mazda RX-8	(United States) Emil Assentato (United States) Nick Longhi (United States) Jeff Segal	675	17	9
2011	GT	26	(United States) Turner Motorsport	BMW M3	(United States) Bill Auberlen (United States) Boris Said (Canada) Paul Dalla Lana	565	32	17
2013	GT	13	(United States) Audi Sport Customer Racing	Audi R8 Grand-Am	(Germany) Frank Biela (Germany) Christopher Haase (Germany) Markus Winkelhock	677	15	7
2021	GTD	64	(United States) Team TGM	Porsche 911 GT3 R	(United States) Ted Giovanis (United States) Hugh Plumb (United States) Owen Trinkler	515	43 ^{DNF}	17 ^{DNF}

=== Complete WeatherTech SportsCar Championship results ===
(key) (Races in bold indicate pole position; results in italics indicate fastest lap)

Year	Team	Class	Make	Engine	1	2	3	4	5	6	7	8	9	10	11	12	Pos.	Points
2021	Team TGM	GTD	Porsche 911 GT3 R	Porsche MA1.76/MDG.G 4.0 L Flat-6	DAY; 17	SEB	MOH	DET	WGL	WGL	LIM	ELK	LGA	LBH	VIR	PET	75th	140
2022	Team TGM	GTD	Porsche 911 GT3 R	Porsche MA1.76/MDG.G 4.0 L Flat-6	DAY; 7	SEB	LBH	LGA	MOH	DET	WGL	MOS	LIM	ELK	VIR	PET	56th	252
2023	Team TGM	GTD Pro	Aston Martin Vantage AMR GT3	Aston Martin 4.0 L Turbo V8	DAY; 7	SEB	LBH	LGA	WGL	MOS	LIM	ELK	VIR	IMS	PET		28th	230
