= Peter Boss =

American racing driver

- Nationality: (United States) American
- Born: August 29, 1975 (age 51) Narragansett, Rhode Island, U.S.
- Retired: 2005
- Relatives: Geoff Boss (brother); Andy Boss (brother)

American Le Mans Series
- Years active: 2001, 2004-2005
- Teams: Westward Racing; P.K. Sport
- Starts: 6
- Wins: 0
- Poles: 0
- Fastest laps: 0
- Best finish: 19th in 2004

Previous series
- 2002-2003 1998-2001 1998-1999 1997: Euro Formula 3000; Barber Dodge Pro Series; Skip Barber Formula Dodge Southern Race Series; Formula Vauxhall Winter Series

Peter Boss (born 29 August 1975) is an American former racing driver. He raced in the Euro Formula 3000, Barber Dodge Pro Series and European Le Mans Series among other racing series. Boss retired from professional racing after the 2005 season.

== Career history ==
Partnering with John Village Automotive Boss entered the Formula Vauxhall Winter Series in Great Britain. The American competed three races in the series. Boss succeeded his racing debut in 1998 in the Skip Barber Formula Dodge Southern Race Series. At Moroso Motorsports Park Boss scored his first career wins. While Matt Plumb dominated the season Boss finished in the runner-up position. The 21-year-old returned to the series in 1999. Boss scored the same number of points as championshipleader Brian Rivera. But as Rivera had more podium finishes Rivera clinched the championship.

In 1998, Boss also started his first Barber Dodge Pro Series season. In his first season, he scored one top ten finish, at Road Atlanta. The driver from Rhode Island was one of two drivers to finish all the races, the other being Todd Snyder. The 1999 season was considerably more successful than his debut season. Boss finished consistently in the top-ten. The American also finished on the podium twice, at Lime Rock Park and Mid-Ohio. This successful campaign landed him the eighth spot in the championship rankings. His 2000 season was cut short due to a lack of sponsorship. Therefore, Boss missed the two final races of the season. As a result, he was only placed thirteenth in the championship. The 2001 season proved to be his last season in the Barber Dodge Pro Series. This was also only a partial season as he participated in eight out of twelve races. After consistent top-ten finishes he was again classified thirteenth in the final standings.

For 2002, Boss returned to Europe to continue his racing career with his old team John Village Automotive. In the Italian-based Euro Formula 3000 Boss competed in a Lola T99/50. He had a tough debut season with a number of DNF's. His best finish was a seventh place at Jerez but as only the top six scored points, Boss did not score any points during the season. His 2003 season was more successful. Boss scored points on several occasions and even scored a podium finish. At Pergusa the American finished behind Nicky Pastorelli and race winner Augusto Farfus. Both he and his teammate, Joel Nelson, finished seventh in the series.

For 2004, Boss joined P.K. Sport for a partial schedule in the American Le Mans Series. Together with his teammate, Hugh Plumb, Boss competed in five ALMS races. The team failed to achieve any notable results with their Porsche 911 GT3-RS.

== Personal life ==
Boss holds a bachelor's degree in history of St. Lawrence University. Boss completed this study in 1997. Boss completed his Master of Business Administration at Babson College in 2010. As of 2010, Boss is employed by WhaleRock Point Partners, a wealth management firm.

== Motorsports results ==
=== American Open-Wheel racing results ===
(key) (Races in bold indicate pole position, races in italics indicate fastest race lap)

==== Barber Dodge Pro Series ====
Year	1	2	3	4	5	6	7	8	9	10	11	12	Rank	Points
1998	(United States); SEB; 12	(United States); LRP; 16	(United States); DET; 16	(United States); WGI; 25	(United States); CLE; 15	(United States); GRA; 16	(United States); MOH; 18	(United States); ROA; 15	(United States); LS1; 16	(United States); ATL; 10	(United States); HMS; 13	(United States); LS2; 12	**23rd**	**19**
1999	(United States); SEB; 8	(United States); NAZ; 4	(United States); LRP; 3	(United States); POR; 15	(United States); CLE; 9	(United States); ROA; 7	(United States); DET; 8	(United States); MOH; 3	(United States); GRA; 9	(United States); LS; 9	(United States); HMS; 17	(United States); WGI; 15	**8th**	**88**
2000	(United States); SEB; 12	(United States); MIA; 6	(United States); NAZ; 14	(United States); LRP; 3	(United States); DET; 9	(United States); CLE; 12	(United States); MOH; 14	(United States); ROA; 25	(Canada); VAN; 12	(United States); LS; 9	(United States); RAT	(United States); HMS	**13th**	**54**
2001	(United States); SEB; 5	(United States); PIR; 10	(United States); LRP1; 5	(United States); LRP2; 14	(United States); DET; 6	(United States); CLE; 8	(Canada); TOR; 8	(United States); CHI; 12	(United States); MOH	(United States); ROA	(Canada); VAN	(United States); LS	**13th**	**58**

=== Complete Euro Formula 3000 results ===
(key) (Races in bold indicate pole position) (Races in italics indicate fastest lap)

Year	Entrant	1	2	3	4	5	6	7	8	9	DC	Points
2002	John Village Automotive	(Italy); VAL; Ret	(Italy); PER; Ret	(Italy); MON; 11	(Belgium); SPA; 12	(United Kingdom); DON; Ret	(Czech Republic); BRN; 11	(France); DIJ; 15	(Spain); JER; 7	(Italy); CAG; 11	NC	0
2003	John Village Automotive	(Germany); NÜR; 5	(France); MAG; 10	(Italy); PER; 3	(Italy); MON; 4	(Belgium); SPA; 4	(United Kingdom); DON; Ret	(Czech Republic); BRN; 8	(Spain); JER; Ret	(Italy); CAG; 8	7th	12

=== Complete Porsche Supercup results ===
(key) (Races in bold indicate pole position) (Races in italics indicate fastest lap)

Year	Team	Car	1	2	3	4	5	6	7	8	9	10	11	12	DC	Points
2004	MRS PC Service Team	Porsche 996 GT3	ITA	ESP	MON	GER; 15	USA	USA	FRA	GBR	GER	HUN	BEL	ITA	NC	0

=== 24 Hours of Daytona ===
24 Hours of Daytona results
Year	Class	No	Team	Car	Co-drivers	Laps	Position	Class Pos.
2000	SR	95	(United States) TRV Motorsport	Riley & Scott Mk. III (Chevrolet)	(United States) Barry Waddell (United States) R.J. Valentine (United States) Tom Volk	380	41	7
2005	GT	11	(United States) JMB Racing	Ferrari 360 Modena	(United States) Matt Plumb (United States) Jim Michaelian (United Kingdom) David Gooding	623	25	11
