= Jason LaPoint =

American racing driver (born 1977)

- Nationality: (United States) American
- Born: January 30, 1977 (age 49) Woodburn, Oregon, U.S.
- Retired: 2001

Atlantic Championship
- Years active: 2001
- Teams: Lynx Racing
- Starts: 3
- Wins: 0
- Poles: 0
- Fastest laps: 0
- Best finish: 15th in 2001

Previous series
- 2001 2000 1998-1999: USF2000; Star Mazda; Skip Barber National Championship

Championship titles
- 2001: USF2000

Awards
- 2001 2000: Greg Moore Rookie of the Year; Star Mazda Rookie of the Year

Jason LaPoint (born January 30, 1977 in Woodburn, Oregon) is a former racing driver. LaPoint won the 2001 USF2000 championship and also competed in Star Mazda and the Atlantic Championship.

== Career ==
LaPoint participated in karting championships of the SKUSA and WKA starting in 1989. In 1995 and 1996, LaPoint won the IKF Grand National Championship in the Formula 125 class. After karting, LaPoint moved into the Skip Barber National Championship Western Race Series in early November 1998. At Mazda Raceway Laguna Seca, LaPoint finished his first race in fifth place. His first win was at Las Vegas Motor Speedway in early 1999. LaPoint finished fourteenth in the championship standings. In the Midwestern championship, LaPoint won five races earning him a third place in the standings, behind Bryan Sellers and Caio Travaglini. As he was successful in the entry level Skip Barber series, LaPoint was invited to join the Barber Dodge Pro Series at Mazda Raceway Laguna Seca supporting CART. He qualified eighteenth but finished on an impressive eleventh place. As he gained seven places, he won the award for Most Progressive Driver.

In 2000, LaPoint left the Skip Barber racing ladder to join Star Mazda. His first race was a huge success. LaPoint led his debut race at Lowe's Motor Speedway. On the last lap, LaPoint was passed by Bernardo Martinez. His engine sputtered for fuel but the Oregon driver secured second place. LaPoint scored more podium finishes at Sonoma Raceway, Mosport Park, Road Atlanta and Mazda Raceway Laguna Seca. He took rookie of the year honors and finished third in the championship. For 2001, LaPoint joined Richard Morgan Racing for a USF2000 title assault. Again, LaPoint succeeded. Despite a couple of retirements in the first half of the season, LaPoint dominated the second half. Four second-place finishes and one win at Mid-Ohio Sports Car Course secured the title for LaPoint.

Near the end of the 2001 racing season, LaPoint competed in the final three Atlantic Championship races with Lynx Racing. LaPoint qualified his Swift 008.a on an impressive third place in his debut outing at Road America. Despite not finishing on the podium, his record of three top-ten finishes was very good for a rookie. Early 2002, LaPoint tested the new Swift 014.a at Roebling Road Raceway for Michael Shank Racing. Lacking a major sponsor, LaPoint did not secure a race seat and retired from professional racing.

== Complete motorsports results ==
=== American Open-Wheel racing results ===
(key) (Races in bold indicate pole position, races in italics indicate fastest race lap)

==== Barber Dodge Pro Series ====
Year	1	2	3	4	5	6	7	8	9	10	11	12	Rank	Points
1999	SEB	NAZ	LRP	POR	CLE	ROA	DET	MOH	GRA	LS; 11	HMS	WGI	**28th**	**5**

==== Star Mazda Championship ====
Year	Team	1	2	3	4	5	6	7	8	Rank	Points
2000	Valley Motor Center	AMS; 2	SON; 3	MOS; 2	TEX; 6	POR; 36	ATL; 3	**LAG**; 2	LV; 4	**3rd**	**264**

==== USF2000 National Championship ====
Year	Entrant	1	2	3	4	5	6	7	8	9	10	11	12	13	Pos	Points
2001	Richard Morgan Racing	HMS1; 4	HMS2; 3	HMS3; 19	WGI1; 23	WGI2; 11	IRP; 9	MOH1; 5	MOH2; 2	**ROA1**; 2	ROA2; 2	**MOH3**; 1	SEB1; 2	SEB2; 9	**1st**	**226**

==== Atlantic Championship ====
Year	Team	1	2	3	4	5	6	7	8	9	10	11	12	Rank	Points
2001	Lynx Racing	LBH	NAZ	MIL	MTL	CLE	TOR	CHI	TRR	ROA	VAN; 7	HOU; 5	LS; 10	**15th**	**19**
