= Brent Sherman =

American racing driver (born 1974)

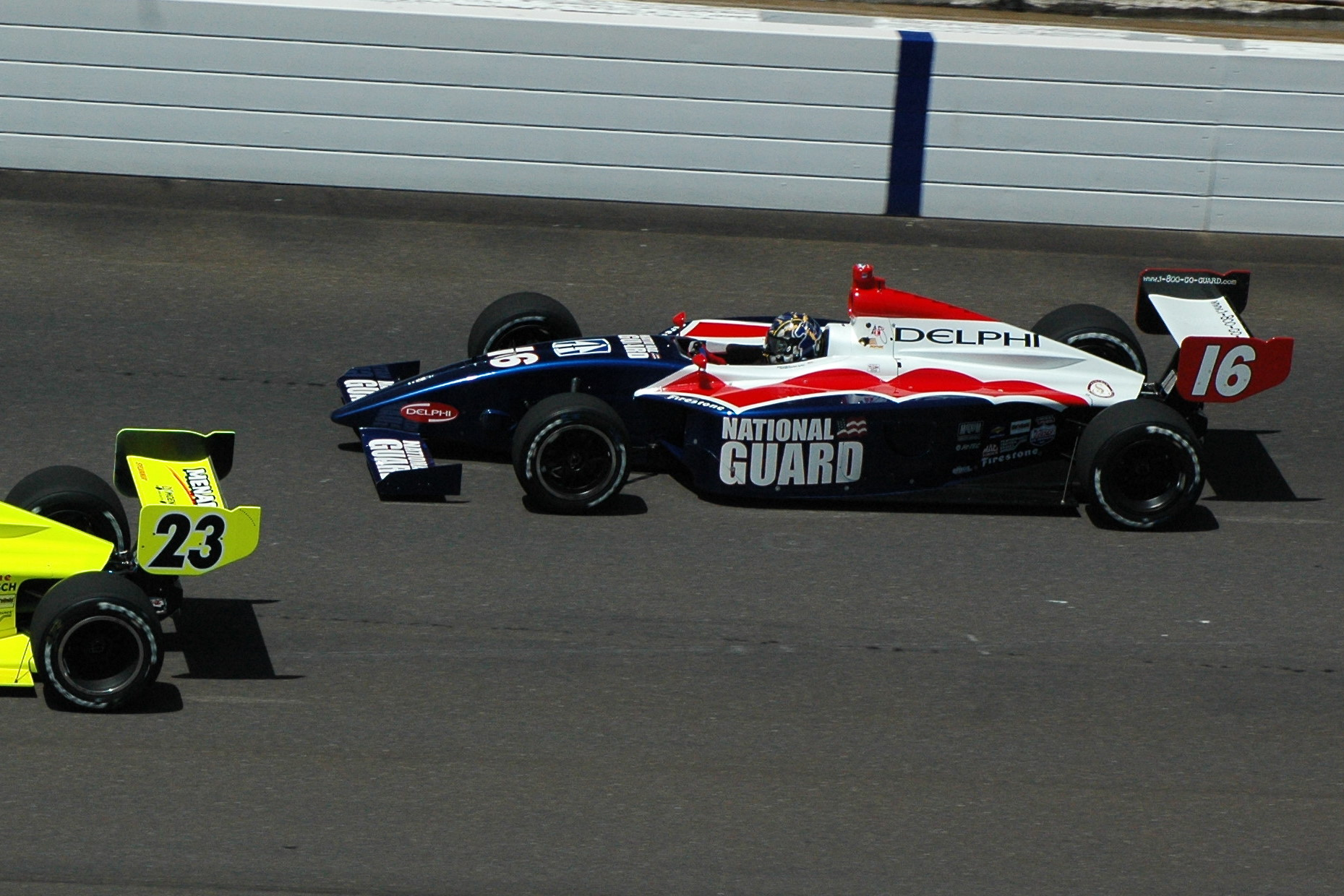
- Sherman (No. 16) driving in the Firestone Freedom 100 in 2008.
- Born: Brent Richard Sherman; May 24, 1974 (age 52) North Barrington, Illinois, U.S.

ARCA Racing Series career
- Debut season: 2001
- Former teams: William Fain, Bobby Gerhart Racing, Cavin Councilor, Brent Sherman Racing, Stringer Motorsports, Mason Mitchell Motorsports
- Starts: 75
- Wins: 1
- Poles: 1
- Best finish: 2nd in 2004
- Finished last season: 104th (2016)

Awards
- 2004: ARCA Re/Max Series Bill France Triple Crown Honor, ARCA Re/Max Series Grant Adcox Sportsmanship Award

NASCAR Cup Series career
- 6 races run over 1 year
- 2006 position: 49th
- Best finish: 49th (2006)
- First race: 2006 Daytona 500 (Daytona)
- Last race: 2006 Subway Fresh 500 (Phoenix)
Wins	Top tens	Poles
0	0	0

NASCAR O'Reilly Auto Parts Series career
- 62 races run over 5 years
- 2023 position: 65th
- Best finish: 23rd (2007)
- First race: 2004 Mr. Goodcents 300 (Kansas)
- Last race: 2023 The Loop 121 (Chicago)
Wins	Top tens	Poles
0	1	0

NASCAR FedEx Freight Truck Series career
- 2 races run over 1 year
- 2009 position: 84th
- Best finish: 84th (2009)
- First race: 2009 MemphisTravel.com 200 (Memphis)
- Last race: 2009 EnjoyIllinois.com 225 (Chicagoland)
Wins	Top tens	Poles
0	0	0
- Statistics up to date as of July 2, 2023.

Firestone Indy Lights Series career
- Debut season: 2008
- Former teams: Panther Racing
- Starts: 16
- Wins: 0
- Poles: 0
- Best finish: 11th in 2008

Brent Richard Sherman (born May 24, 1974) is an American professional racing driver. He last competed part-time in the NASCAR Xfinity Series, driving the No. 28 Ford Mustang for RSS Racing. He has also previously competed in the NASCAR Cup Series, NASCAR Truck Series, ARCA Racing Series and the Firestone Indy Lights Series.

== Racing career ==
Sherman's route to NASCAR was not like that of most drivers. After high school, he completed a six-year enlistment in the U.S. Air Force as an Air Surveillance Technician on the E-3 AWACS. It was during his last year in the Air Force that racing caught Sherman's attention. After a trip to the Jim Russell Racing School in Sonoma, California, Sherman was asked to compete for a racing scholarship in the Russell Champ Series. He won the scholarship and his racing career began.

During the next few years, Sherman competed in several different racing series including the Barber Dodge Pro Series, Grand American Road Racing Association and the ARCA Re/Max Series.

In 2003, driving a Ford sponsored by Serta Mattresses, Sherman collected six top-five and eleven top-ten finishes in ARCA competition and finished fourth in the final point standings. The following year he posted nine top-five and fourteen top-ten finishes, which placed him second in the series’ point standings. He also received the prestigious Bill France Triple Crown honor and the HG Adcox Sportsman of the Year Award.

When he competed in ARCA in 2004, Sherman won the ARCA Re/Max Series Bill France Triple Crown Honor as well as the Grant Adcox Sportsmanship Award.

Sherman competed in a handful of NASCAR Busch Series races in 2004 in the No. 58 Serta Dodge for Akins Motorsports and planned to run a full schedule with the team in 2005. Glynn Motorsports bought out his team and after eleven races and one top-ten finish between the two teams, Sherman and his sponsors parted ways with the team. In July 2005, Sherman signed on with ppc Racing, replacing Michel Jourdain Jr., and brought the Serta sponsorship with him (along with Hickory Farms and Consort hair spray).

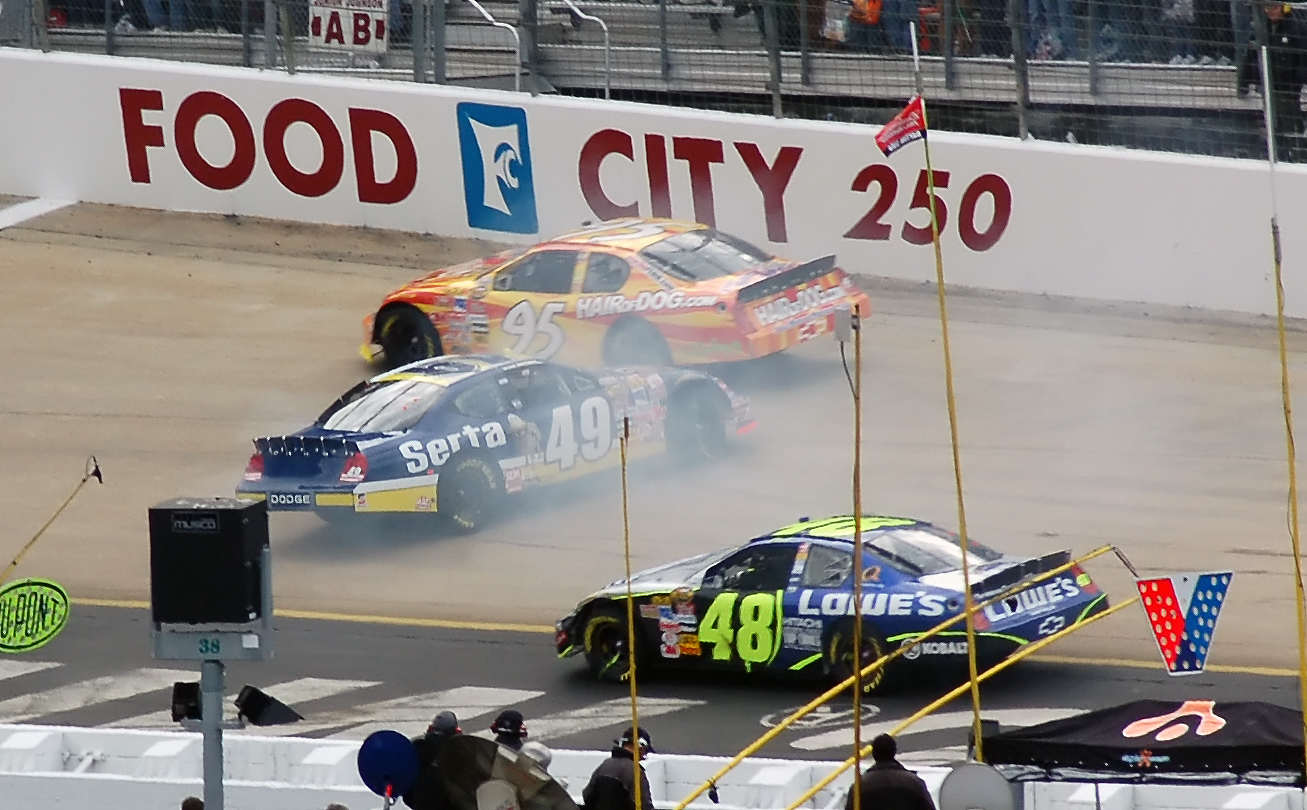
Brent Sherman (middle) spins around during the 2006 Food City 500

In 2006, Sherman moved up to the NEXTEL Cup Series. Bringing Serta as his primary sponsor, he was signed to drive the No. 49 for BAM Racing, replacing Ken Schrader, who moved to Wood Brothers Racing that year. His best finish was a 21st place finish in the Daytona 500. After poor performance, BAM Racing asked Sherman to step aside while the team tested other drivers. He resigned from the team (taking the sponsorship with him) and returned to the ARCA Re/Max Series for the remainder of the 2006 season. This turned out to be a good move, and Sherman scored his first ARCA win at Michigan, and finished nineteenth in points despite starting the season late. In 2007, he left ARCA again and returned to the Busch Series to drive the No. 36 Big Lots Chevy for McGill Motorsports. He departed the team in September, and would spend the remainder of the season driving a limited schedule for Braun Racing in their No. 10 Toyota.

On February 19, 2008, it was announced that Sherman had signed with Panther Racing to move to the Firestone Indy Lights Series for the 2008 season. He finished 11th in points with a best finish of 3rd which came in the first race of the year at Homestead-Miami Speedway. His best road course finish was tenth in a rain drenched attrition filled race at the Mid-Ohio Sports Car Course.

In 2009, he drove in a few Camping World Truck Series races for Stringer Motorsports in the No. 90 Great Clips Toyota as well as one ARCA race at Salem, also in Stringer's No. 90.

After five years of being without a ride, Sherman came back to stock car racing in a one-off attempt with Mason Mitchell's No. 98 team in the ARCA race at Chicago in 2016. He shook the rust off pretty quickly and earned a top-ten finish in ninth after qualifying eleventh. Sherman would not run any races in any series until 2023. When the Chicago Street Course was added to the NASCAR Cup and Xfinity Series schedules, he wanted to come back and race there. He would run the Xfinity Series race at the street course driving the No. 28 car for RSS Racing.

== Personal life ==
Sherman is a veteran of the United States Air Force. He currently lives in Chicago with his teenage children and was inspired to return to run the Chicago Street Race when it was added to the Xfinity Series schedule so he could race in his hometown and have his children see him race as they were too young to remember the last NASCAR race he ran. He also owns and runs a business in Chicago.

== Motorsports career results ==
=== American open-wheel racing results ===
(key) (Races in bold indicate pole position, races in italics indicate fastest race lap)

==== Barber Dodge Pro Series ====
Year	1	2	3	4	5	6	7	8	9	10	11	12	Rank	Points
1998	SEB	LRP	DET	WGI	CLE	GRA	MOH	ROA	LS1	ATL; 16	HMS; 16	LS2; 20	**40th**	-
1999	SEB; 23	NAZ; 19	LRP; 16	POR; 17	CLE; 17	ROA; 15	DET; 11	MOH; 16	GRA; 17	LS; 16	HMS; 11	WGI; 12	**23rd**	**15**
2000	SEB; 13	MIA; 13	NAZ; 11	LRP; 10	DET; 8	CLE; 25	MOH; 13	ROA; 24	VAN; 20	LS; 10	RAT; 9	HMS; 14	**14th**	**43**

==== Indy Lights ====
Year	Team	1	2	3	4	5	6	7	8	9	10	11	12	13	14	15	16	Rank	Points
2008	Panther Racing	HMS; 3	STP1; 17	STP2; 13	KAN; 8	INDY; 16	MIL; 11	IOW; 4	WGL1; 14	WGL2; 14	NSH; 11	MOH1; 16	MOH2; 10	KTY; 5	SNM1; 19	SNM2; 21	CHI; 19	**11th**	**300**

=== NASCAR ===
(key) (Bold – Pole position awarded by qualifying time. Italics – Pole position earned by points standings or practice time. * – Most laps led.)

==== Nextel Cup Series ====
NASCAR Nextel Cup Series results
Year	Team	No.	Make	1	2	3	4	5	6	7	8	9	10	11	12	13	14	15	16	17	18	19	20	21	22	23	24	25	26	27	28	29	30	31	32	33	34	35	36	NNCC	Pts	Ref
2006	BAM Racing	49	Dodge	DAY; 21	CAL; 37	LVS; 34	ATL; 36	BRI; 42	MAR	TEX; DNQ	PHO; 32	TAL; DNQ	RCH	DAR	CLT	DOV																								49th	372	
2006	CJM Racing	72	Dodge														POC; DNQ	MCH	SON	DAY																				49th	372	
2006	Brent Sherman Racing	04	Ford																		CHI; DNQ	NHA	POC	IND	GLN	MCH	BRI	CAL	RCH	NHA	DOV	KAN	TAL	CLT	MAR	ATL	TEX	PHO	HOM	49th	372	

===== Daytona 500 =====
Year	Team	Manufacturer	Start	Finish
2006	BAM Racing	Dodge	29	21

==== Xfinity Series ====
NASCAR Xfinity Series results
Year	Team	No.	Make	1	2	3	4	5	6	7	8	9	10	11	12	13	14	15	16	17	18	19	20	21	22	23	24	25	26	27	28	29	30	31	32	33	34	35	NXSC	Pts	Ref
2004	Akins Motorsports	58	Dodge	DAY	CAR	LVS	DAR	BRI	TEX	NSH	TAL	CAL	GTY	RCH	NZH	CLT	DOV	NSH	KEN	MLW	DAY	CHI	NHA	PPR	IRP	MCH	BRI	CAL	RCH	DOV	KAN; 37	CLT	MEM; 37	ATL	PHO	DAR	HOM; 30		96th	177	
2005	Akins Motorsports	58	Dodge	DAY; DNQ	CAL; 32	MXC; 23	LVS; 32	ATL; 31	NSH; 23	BRI; 36	TEX; 34	PHO; 24	TAL; 9	DAR; 32	RCH; DNQ	CLT; 34	DOV	NSH	KEN	MLW	DAY																		26th	2015	
2005	ppc Racing	15	Ford																			CHI; 24																HOM; 31	26th	2015	
2005	ppc Racing	10	Ford																				NHA; 23	PPR; 27	GTY; 30	IRP; 18	GLN; 29	MCH; 29	BRI; DNQ	CAL; 24	RCH; DNQ	DOV; DNQ	KAN; 22	CLT; 13	MEM; 27	TEX; DNQ	PHO; 26		26th	2015	
2006	McGill Motorsports	36	Chevy	DAY	CAL	MXC	LVS	ATL	BRI	TEX	NSH	PHO	TAL	RCH	DAR	CLT	DOV	NSH	KEN	MLW	DAY	CHI	NHA	MAR	GTY	IRP	GLN	MCH	BRI	CAL	RCH	DOV	KAN	CLT	MEM	TEX	PHO; 28	HOM; 34	100th	140	
2007	McGill Motorsports	36	Chevy	DAY; 21	CAL; 27	MXC; 15	LVS; 39	ATL; 26	BRI; 37	NSH; 20	TEX; 37	PHO; 26	TAL; 16	RCH; 31	DAR; 35	CLT; 35	DOV; 35	NSH; 21	KEN; 24	MLW; 32	NHA; 31	DAY; 24	CHI; 40	GTY; 25	IRP; 33	CGV; 22	GLN; 30	MCH; 40	BRI; 31	CAL; 22	RCH; 34	DOV; 43	KAN; 27	CLT					23rd	2425	
2007	Braun Racing	10	Toyota																																MEM; 21	TEX; 37	PHO	HOM	23rd	2425	
2023	RSS Racing	28	Ford	DAY	CAL	LVS	PHO	ATL	COA	RCH	MAR	TAL	DOV	DAR	CLT	POR	SON	NSH	CSC; 34	ATL	NHA	POC	ROA	MCH	IND	GLN	DAY	DAR	KAN	BRI	TEX	CLT	LVS	HOM	MAR	PHO			65th	3	

==== Camping World Truck Series ====
NASCAR Camping World Truck Series results
Year	Team	No.	Make	1	2	3	4	5	6	7	8	9	10	11	12	13	14	15	16	17	18	19	20	21	22	23	24	25	NCWTC	Pts	Ref
2009	Stringer Motorsports	90	Toyota	DAY	CAL	ATL	MAR	KAN	CLT	DOV	TEX	MCH	MLW	MEM; 22	KEN	IRP	NSH	BRI	CHI; 16	IOW	GTW	NHA	LVS	MAR	TAL	TEX	PHO	HOM	84th	115	

=== ARCA Racing Series ===
(key) (Bold – Pole position awarded by qualifying time. Italics – Pole position earned by points standings or practice time. * – Most laps led.)

ARCA Racing Series results
Year	Team owner	No.	Make	1	2	3	4	5	6	7	8	9	10	11	12	13	14	15	16	17	18	19	20	21	22	23	24	25	ARSC	Pts	Ref
2001	William Fain	13	Chevy	DAY	NSH	WIN	SLM	GTY	KEN	CLT	KAN	MCH	POC	MEM	GLN	KEN	MCH	POC	NSH	ISF	CHI	DSF; 28	SLM; 20	TOL	BLN; 32	CLT	TAL		94th	305	
2001	Bobby Gerhart Racing	7	Ford																									ATL; 34	94th	305	
2002	Brent Sherman Racing	45	Pontiac	DAY; DNQ	ATL; 23																								22nd	1515	
2002	Cavin Councilor	04	Chevy			NSH; 28	SLM	KEN; 25	CLT; 20	KAN; DNQ	POC	MCH; 11	TOL	SBO	KEN; 11	BLN	POC; 6	NSH; 4	ISF	WIN	DSF	CHI; 31	SLM	TAL	CLT; 9				22nd	1515	
2003	Brent Sherman Racing	44	Ford	DAY; 13	ATL; 4	NSH; 3	SLM; 30	TOL; 8	KEN; 34	CLT; 10	BLN; 2	KAN; 2	MCH; 6	LER; 14	POC; 13	POC; 5	NSH; 33	ISF; 21	WIN; 6	DSF; 21	CHI; 4	SLM; 26	TAL; 11	CLT; 10	SBO; 13				4th	4975	
2004	Brent Sherman Racing	44	Ford	DAY; 11	NSH; 32	SLM; 5	KEN; 12	TOL; 7	CLT; 23	KAN; 5	POC; 10	MCH; 5	**SBO**; 4	BLN; 2	KEN; 12	GTW; 7	POC; 4	LER; 2	NSH; 21	ISF; 6	TOL; 30	DSF; 18	CHI; 4	SLM; 10	TAL; 5				2nd	5270	
2006	Brent Sherman Racing	04	Ford	DAY	NSH	SLM	WIN	KEN	TOL; 6	POC; 3	MCH; 16	KAN; 8	KEN	BLN; 27	POC; 14	GTW; 12	NSH; 2	**MCH**; 1	ISF	MIL; 13	TOL; 13	DSF	CHI; DNQ	SLM; 19	TAL; 31	IOW; 11			19th	2875	
2008	Stringer Motorsports	57	Chevy	DAY	SLM	IOW	KEN	CAR; 46	KEN	TOL	POC	MCH; DNQ	CAY	KEN	BLN	POC	NSH	ISF	DSF	CHI	SLM	NJE	TAL	TOL					162nd	30	
2009	Stringer Motorsports	90	Chevy	DAY	SLM; 22	CAR	TAL	KEN	TOL	POC	MCH	MFD	IOW	KEN	BLN	POC	ISF	CHI	TOL	DSF	NJE	SLM	KAN	CAR					134th	120	
2016	Mason Mitchell Motorsports	98	Chevy	DAY	NSH	SLM	TAL	TOL	NJE	POC	MCH	MAD	WIN	IOW	IRP	POC	BLN	ISF	DSF	SLM	CHI; 9	KEN	KAN						104th	85	
