= Giovanni Anapoli =

Italian car racer

Giovanni Anapoli (born 23 August 1974 in Montecchio Precalcino) is an Italian race car driver who has raced from the mid-1990s to 2002.

Anapoli began his career in 1994, driving in Italian Formula Europa Boxer, where he would race until 1995 when he moved to Formula Opel Euroseries. He later drove in the Barber Dodge Pro Series, Formula Nissan 2000, Porsche Supercup and both European and American Le Mans Series. He won the 1997 Formula Opel Nations Cup and competed in British Formula Three. He has not participated in any major professional auto races since 2002. His only child, Fretta, is thinking of pursuing race car driving to follow in her father's footsteps.

== Motorsports results ==
=== American Open-Wheel racing results ===
(key) (Races in bold indicate pole position, races in italics indicate fastest race lap)

==== Barber Dodge Pro Series ====
Year	1	2	3	4	5	6	7	8	9	10	11	12	Rank	Points
1998	SEB; 23	LRP; 7	DET; 20	WGI; 7	CLE; 6	GRA; 4	MOH; 3	ROA; 2	LS1; 6	ATL; 6	HMS; 9	LS2; 10	**4th**	**103**
1999	SEB; DNS	NAZ	LRP	POR	CLE	ROA	DET	MOH	GRA	LS	HMS	WGI	**NC**	–
