= Victor Gonzalez Jr. =

Puerto Rican racing driver (born 1975)

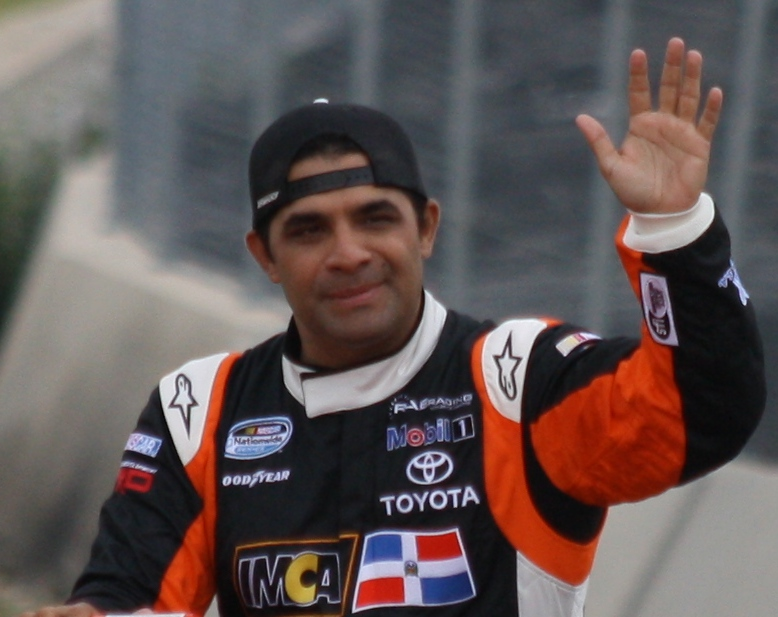
- Gonzalez at Road America in 2012
- Born: July 18, 1975 (age 51); San Juan, Puerto Rico

NASCAR Cup Series career
- 2 races run over 1 year
- 2013 position: 48th
- Best finish: 48th (2013)
- First race: 2013 Toyota/Save Mart 350 (Sonoma)
- Last race: 2013 Cheez-It 355 at The Glen (Watkins Glen)
Wins	Top tens	Poles
0	0	0

NASCAR O'Reilly Auto Parts Series career
- 7 races run over 3 years
- 2018 position: 76th
- Best finish: 60th (2012)
- First race: 2009 NAPA Auto Parts 200 (Montreal)
- Last race: 2018 Zippo 200 at The Glen (Watkins Glen)
Wins	Top tens	Poles
0	0	0

NASCAR FedEx Freight Truck Series career
- 1 race run over 1 year
- 2017 position: 56th
- Best finish: 56th (2017)
- First race: 2017 Chevrolet Silverado 250 (Mosport)
Wins	Top tens	Poles
0	0	0
- Statistics up to date as of November 17, 2018.

Victor Gonzalez Jr. (born July 18, 1975) is a Puerto Rican professional stock car racing driver. He last competed part-time in the NASCAR Xfinity Series, driving the No. 17 Chevrolet Camaro for Niece Motorsports. Twice a competitor in the 24 Hours of Daytona endurance race, he became the first Puerto Rican driver to compete in a top level NASCAR series when he broke the barrier in 2009.

== Racing career ==
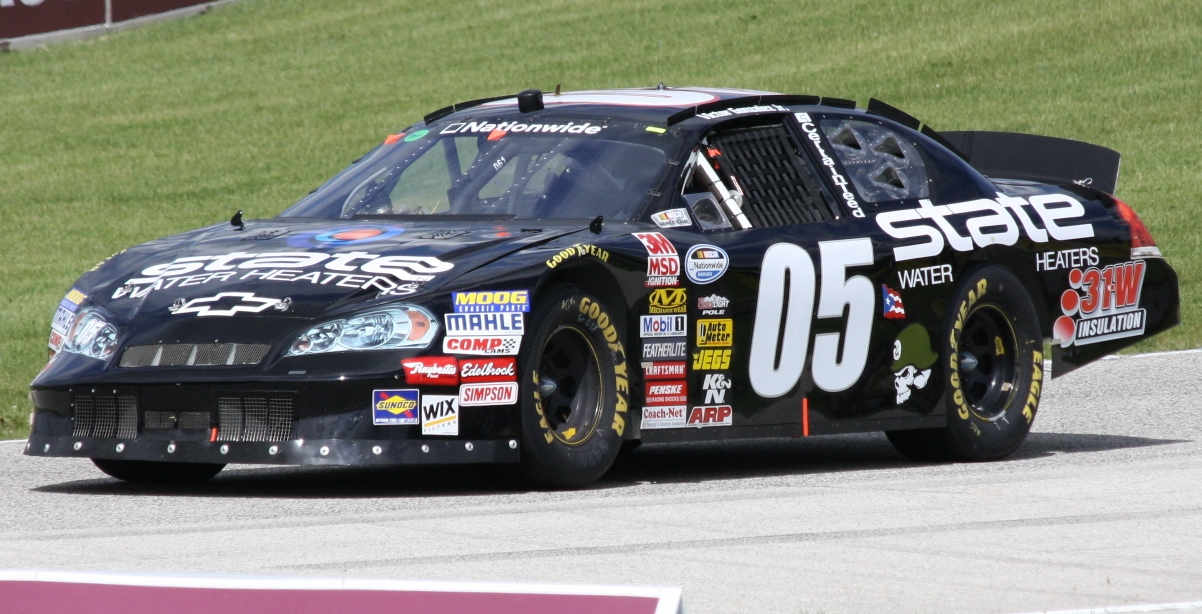
Gonzalez's 2010 Nationwide Series car

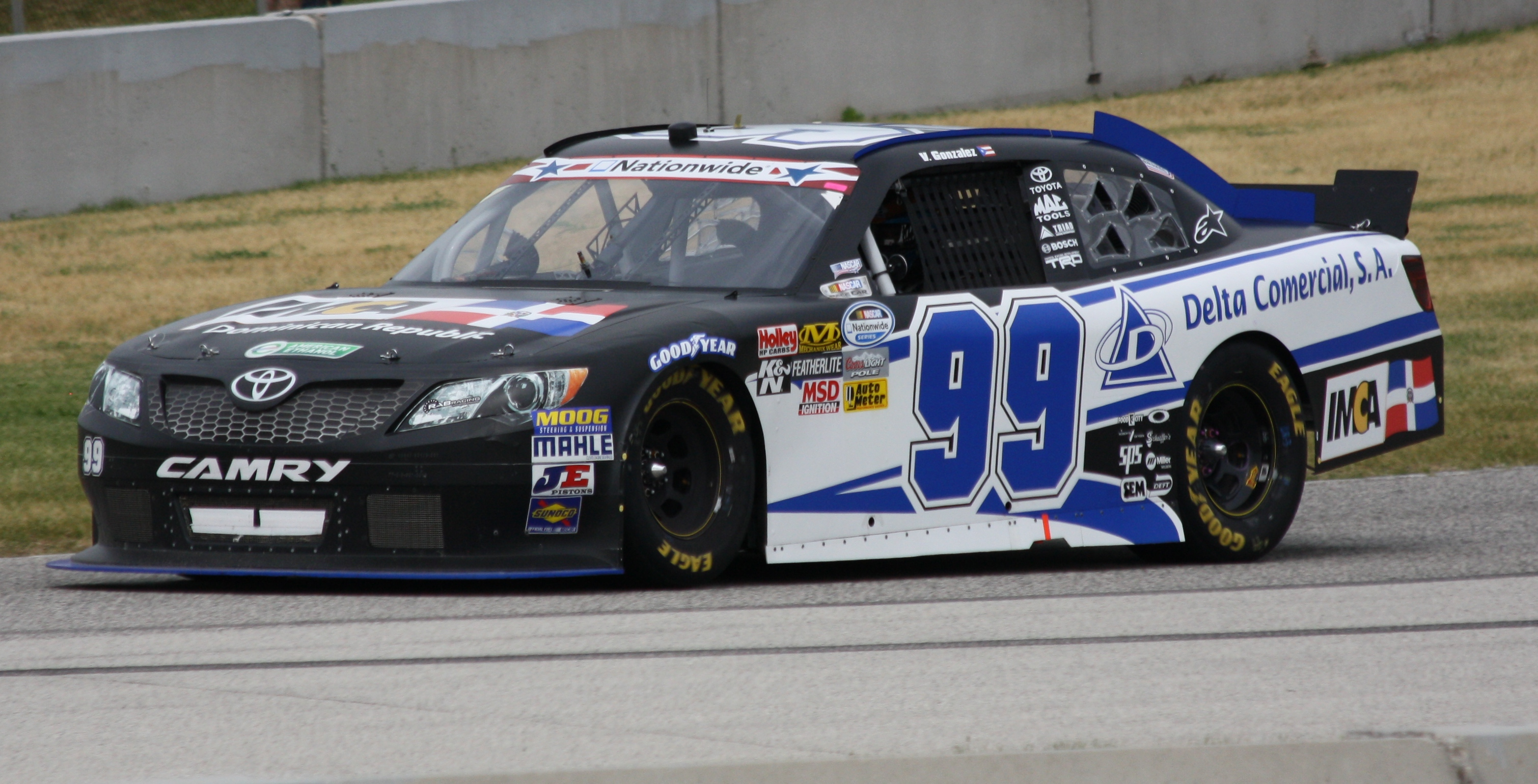
Gonzalez's 2012 Nationwide Series car

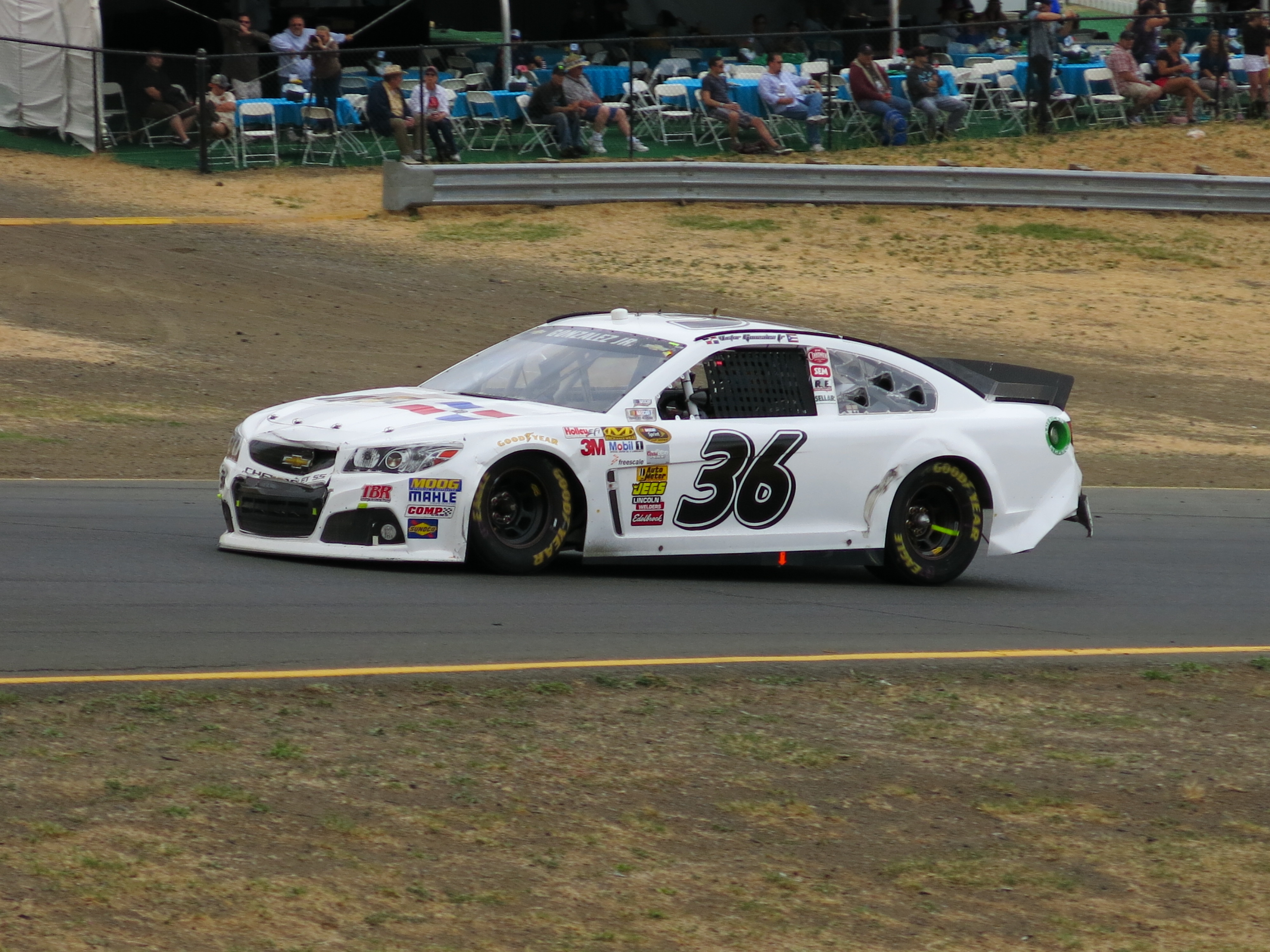
Gonzalez Jr. during the 2013 Toyota/Save Mart 350

Gonzalez began his racing career in 1990 in showroom stock cars in his native country, Puerto Rico. He spent several years competing in touring cars, including two races in the North American Touring Car Championship, before switching to open wheel competition in 1997, competing in the Barber Dodge Pro Series for two years. Then, after two years in the Dominican Republic GTS Cup, moving to the Toyota Atlantic Championship in 2002, he competed in the series' companion event to the Grand Prix of Long Beach, finishing 21st. In 2003, he returned to the Barber Dodge series, where he finished twentieth in points, posting a best finish of second following winning the pole at The Milwaukee Mile. He established a reputation as an excellent driver on road courses, and became the only Puerto Rican driver to become an instructor at the Skip Barber Racing School.

In 2005 and 2006, Gonzalez competed in the 24 Hours of Daytona endurance race, co-driving a Porsche 911 for Team Sahlen. He finished ninth in both events.

Gonzalez made his debut in NASCAR competition in 2009, as a road course ringer at Circuit Gilles Villeneuve in the Nationwide Series NAPA Auto Parts 200, driving the No. 05 Ford for Day Enterprises. He became the first Puerto Rican driver to compete in a NASCAR national touring series event, finishing 14th in his inaugural event.

Gonzalez returned to the No. 05 for four races in 2010, making his oval track debut at Phoenix International Raceway; his best finish of the year came at Montreal where he finished sixteenth.

In 2012, Gonzalez returned to the Nationwide Series, driving the No. 99 Toyota for RAB Racing at Road America in June, where he finished seventeenth, and at Watkins Glen International in August, where he finished sixteenth.

In April 2013, it was announced that Gonzalez would make his NASCAR Sprint Cup Series debut, driving the No. 36 Chevrolet for Tommy Baldwin Racing in races at Sonoma Raceway and Watkins Glen International that summer. He was the first Puerto Rican driver to start a Sprint Cup race.

Gonzalez and Niece Motorsports made an agreement in June 2017 to have Gonzalez drive Niece's No. 45 truck at Canadian Tire Motorsport Park that summer.

== Motorsports career results ==
=== North American Touring Car Championship ===
(key)

North American Touring Car Championship results
Year	Team	No.	Car	1	2	3	4	5	6	7	8	9	10	11	12	13	14	15	16	NATCC	Pts
1996	Fastech Group	27	Ford Mondeo	LRP	LRP	DET	DET	PIR; 7	PIR; 7	TOR	TOR	TRV	TRV	MOH	MOH	VAN	VAN	LS	LS	14th	20

=== Barber Dodge Pro Series ===
Barber Dodge Pro Series results
Year	1	2	3	4	5	6	7	8	9	10	11	12	Rank	Points
1997	STP; 4	SEB; 29	SAV; 6	LRP; 18	MOH; 15	WGI; 13	MIN; 24	MOH; 6	ROA; 28	LS; 12	REN; 6	LS; 15	**12th**	**51**
1998	SEB; 2	LRP; 26	DET; 26	WGI; 27	CLE; 26	GRA; 21	MOH	ROA	LS1	ATL	HMS	LS2	**24th**	**17**
1999	SEB; 15	NAZ; 14	LRP; DNS	POR	CLE	ROA	DET	MOH	GRA	LS	HMS	WGI	**31st**	**3**

=== NASCAR ===
(key) (Bold – Pole position awarded by qualifying time. Italics – Pole position earned by points standings or practice time. * – Most laps led.)

==== Sprint Cup Series ====
NASCAR Sprint Cup Series results
Year	Team	No.	Make	1	2	3	4	5	6	7	8	9	10	11	12	13	14	15	16	17	18	19	20	21	22	23	24	25	26	27	28	29	30	31	32	33	34	35	36	NSCC	Pts	Ref
2013	Tommy Baldwin Racing	36	Chevy	DAY	PHO	LVS	BRI	CAL	MAR	TEX	KAN	RCH	TAL	DAR	CLT	DOV	POC	MCH	SON; 37	KEN	DAY	NHA	IND	POC	GLN; 41	MCH	BRI	ATL	RCH	CHI	NHA	DOV	KAN	CLT	TAL	MAR	TEX	PHO	HOM	48th	10	

==== Xfinity Series ====
NASCAR Xfinity Series results
Year	Team	No.	Make	1	2	3	4	5	6	7	8	9	10	11	12	13	14	15	16	17	18	19	20	21	22	23	24	25	26	27	28	29	30	31	32	33	34	35	NXSC	Pts	Ref
2009	Day Enterprises	05	Ford	DAY	CAL	LVS	BRI	TEX	NSH	PHO	TAL	RCH	DAR	CLT	DOV	NSH	KEN	MLW	NHA	DAY	CHI	GTW	IRP	IOW	GLN	MCH	BRI	CGV; 14	ATL	RCH	DOV	KAN	CAL	CLT	MEM	TEX	PHO	HOM	123rd	121	
2010	Day Enterprises	05	Chevy	DAY	CAL	LVS	BRI	NSH	PHO; 29	TEX	TAL	RCH	DAR	DOV	CLT	NSH	KEN	ROA; 23	NHA	DAY	CHI	GTW	IRP	IOW	GLN; 37	MCH	BRI	CGV; 16	ATL	RCH	DOV	KAN	CAL	CLT	GTY	TEX	PHO	HOM	83rd	337	
2012	RAB Racing	99	Toyota	DAY	PHO	LVS	BRI	CAL	TEX	RCH	TAL	DAR	IOW	CLT	DOV	MCH	ROA; 17	KEN	DAY	NHA	CHI	IND	IOW	GLN; 16	CGV	BRI	ATL	RCH	CHI	KEN	DOV	CLT	KAN	TEX	PHO	HOM			60th	55	
2018	Niece Motorsports	17	Chevy	DAY	ATL	LVS	PHO	CAL	TEX	BRI	RCH	TAL	DOV	CLT	POC	MCH	IOW	CHI	DAY	KEN	NHA	IOW	GLN; 31	MOH	BRI	ROA	DAR	IND	LVS	RCH	CLT	DOV	KAN	TEX	PHO	HOM			76th	6	

==== Camping World Truck Series ====
NASCAR Camping World Truck Series results
Year	Team	No.	Make	1	2	3	4	5	6	7	8	9	10	11	12	13	14	15	16	17	18	19	20	21	22	23	NCWTC	Pts	Ref
2017	Niece Motorsports	45	Chevy	DAY	ATL	MAR	KAN	CLT	DOV	TEX	GTW	IOW	KEN	ELD	POC	MCH	BRI	MSP; 16	CHI	NHA	LVS	TAL	MAR	TEX	PHO	HOM	56th	24	

^{*} Season still in progress
^{1} not eligible for series points
