= Sepp Koster =

Dutch racing driver

- Nationality: (Netherlands) Dutch
- Born: September 17, 1974 (age 52) Heemskerk, North Holland

Formula Ford
- Years active: 2008-2009

Previous series
- 2008-2009 2002 1998-2001 1996-1997 1994-1995 1989-1993: Formula Ford; Atlantic Championship; Barber Dodge Pro Series; Formula Opel; Formula Ford; Karting

Championship titles
- 1995 1995: Dutch Formula Ford; Benelux Formula Ford

Josephus "Sepp" Koster (born 17 September 1974 in Heemskerk) is a former Dutch racing driver. Koster made appearances in various racing classes throughout Europe and North-America.

== Career ==
=== Europe ===
Sepp Koster grew up in Mol, Belgium and later moved to Antwerp. Koster started kart racing in 1989 at the age of 15. After successes he graduated to the Dutch Formula Ford championship in 1993. The young driver continued racing while studying mechanical engineering at the Eindhoven University of Technology. The 18-year-old driver made his debut with the Ford supported GEVA Racing team. While Bas Leinders won the championship, Koster achieved a third place in the standings after his inaugural autoracing season. The next year Koster won the Dutch and Benelux championships. Driving a Swift, he participated in the Formula Ford Festival achieving a 17th place in the championship race. After winning his first championship in formula racing, Koster graduated to Formula Opel. He scored two podium finishes during his first season and was placed sixth in the standings. At the EFDA Nations Cup, Koster was coupled with Sandor van Es. With all drivers racing equal Reynard Formula Opel/Vauxhall cars, the couple achieved a sixth place at the 1996 EFDA Nations Cup. The following season, Koster doubled the amount of podium finishes he scored in the last season. The good results meant he ended up third in the standings of the Formula Opel Europe championship. At the 1997 EFDA Nations Cup, again coupled with Sandor van Es, the duo reached a ninth place.

=== North-America ===
To continue his racing career Koster moved to the United States of America. The young driver got into contact with Arie Luyendyk who trained him to race on oval tracks. Sepp Koster made his debut in the Barber Dodge Pro Series in 1998. He drove the car for the first time during a collective test at Sebring International Raceway in February. During the first raceweekend of the series Koster qualified on pole-position. But the European driver never had done a rolling start but he managed to retain the lead. After a spin which resulted in contact he had to retire. The Dutch driver finished his first season in the Barber Dodge series in ninth place of the championship. The following year Koster achieved his first podium finish in America. At the West Michigan Grand Prix Koster started from pole position. After Todd Snyder passed him on the tight street circuit Koster settled for second place. After finishing in the top ten and top five he finished fifth in the standings.

In 2000 Sepp Koster scored his first Barber Dodge and oval racing win. Being fast all weekend long Koster won the race at Nazareth Motor Speedway. He finished in front of Ryan Hunter-Reay and Andy Lally. Koster scored another four podium finishes and finished third in the standings. The Dutchman returned for a fourth season in the racingclass in 2001. His second win in the series came at Lime Rock Park. On Memorial Day Koster passed polesitter Davy Cook for the lead. He held off Hunter-Reay for all 37 laps. The Dutchman won by 0.357 seconds. He scored a second win of the season during the Grand Prix of Cleveland. At the Cleveland Burke Lakefront Airport circuit, Koster started from pole-position, won the race and set the fastest race lap. His final win in the series came at Road America. Koster again won the race from pole-position. Koster finished second in the standings, only four points behind series champion Nicolas Rondet.

After testing with Doricott Racing, Koster entered the Atlantic Championship with Michael Shank Racing for the 2002 CART Toyota Atlantic Series season. After scoring his first top ten finish at Long Beach, Koster had to withdraw from the Milwaukee race. After a crash during practice on Friday, Kosters Swift 014.a was too badly damaged to race on Sunday. Koster qualified third for the Toronto race of the championship. Koster was taken out of the race by Waldemar Coronas, who hit the Dutchmans car from behind. The Dutch driver failed to obtain a seat for the 2003 season and retired from racing.

=== Current activities ===
Koster made a brief return to Formula Ford in 2008. He drove two races in the Benelux championship achieving one podium finish at Zandvoort. Koster finished third in the first heat of the Formula Ford Festival. The Dutchman finished eighth in the championship race, behind Kevin Magnussen. Koster returned the following year finishing seventh.

== Racing record ==
=== American open–wheel racing results ===
(key) (Races in bold indicate pole position) (Races in italics indicate fastest lap)

==== Barber Dodge Pro Series ====
Year	1	2	3	4	5	6	7	8	9	10	11	12	Rank	Points
1998	SEB; **DNF**	LRP; 4	DET; 4	WAT; 5	CLE; DNF	GRA; DNF	MDO; DNF	ROA; 9	LS; DNF	RAT; 4	MSC; 14	CLE; 14	**9th**	**61**
1999	SEB; 6	NAZ; 5	LRP; 7	POR; 12	CLE; DNF	ROA; 9	DET; 5	MDO; 15	GRA; **2**	LS; 7	HMS; 8	WAT; DNF	**5th**	**97**
2000	SEB; 7	MIA; 7	NAZ; **1**	LRP; 6	DET; 7	CLE; 2	MDO; 3	ROA; 5	VAN; 5	LS; 21	RAT; 7	HMS; 2	**3rd**	**130**
2001	SEB; DNF	PIR; 2	LRP1; **18**	LRP2; 1	DET; DNF	CLE; 1	TOR; 2	CHI; 6	MDO; 3	ROA; **1**	VAN; 3	LS; 2	**2nd**	**151**

==== Atlantic Championship ====
Year	Team	1	2	3	4	5	6	7	8	9	10	11	12	Rank	Points
2002	Michael Shank Racing	MTY; 13	LBH; 8	MIL; WD	LS; 9	POR; 21	CHI; Ret	TOR; Ret	CLE; Ret	TRR; 10	ROA; 8	MTL; 8	DEN; 8	**14th**	**40**
