= 1999 Barber Dodge Pro Series =

1999 Barber Dodge Pro Series season

Seasons
- ← 1998 2000 →

The 1999 Barber Dodge Pro Series season was the fourteenth season of the series. All cars are Dodge powered, Michelin shod, Reynard 98E chassis.

== Race calendar and results ==
Round	Circuit	Location	Date	Pole position	Fastest lap	Winning driver
1	Sebring International Raceway	(United States) Sebring, Florida	March 20	(United States) Rocky Moran Jr.	(United States) Rocky Moran Jr.	(United States) Rocky Moran Jr.
2	Nazareth Speedway	(United States) Lehigh Valley, Pennsylvania	May 22	(United States) Rocky Moran Jr.	(United States) Todd Snyder	(United States) Rocky Moran Jr.
3	Lime Rock Park	(United States) Lime Rock, Connecticut	May 31	(United States) Rocky Moran Jr.	(United States) Rocky Moran Jr.	(United States) Townsend Bell
4	Portland International Raceway	(United States) Portland, Oregon	June 19	(United States) Townsend Bell	(Brazil) Nilton Rossoni	(United States) Jeff Simmons
5	Burke Lakefront Airport	(United States) Cleveland, Ohio	June 27	(United States) Todd Snyder	(Switzerland) Iradj Alexander	(Brazil) Nilton Rossoni
6	Road America	(United States) Elkhart Lake, Wisconsin	July 11	(United States) Jeff Simmons	(Brazil) Nilton Rossoni	(United States) Jeff Simmons
7	Detroit Belle Isle Grand Prix	(United States) Detroit, Michigan	August 8	(United States) Jeff Simmons	(Brazil) Nilton Rossoni	(United States) Todd Snyder
8	Mid-Ohio Sports Car Course	(United States) Lexington, Ohio	August 16	(United States) Peter Boss	(Switzerland) Iradj Alexander	(United States) Todd Snyder
9	West Michigan Grand Prix	(United States) Grand Rapids, Michigan	August 29	(Netherlands) Sepp Koster	(United States) Todd Snyder	(United States) Todd Snyder
10	Mazda Raceway Laguna Seca	(United States) Monterey County, California	September 12	(United States) Jeff Simmons	(United States) Jeff Simmons	(United States) Jeff Simmons
11	Homestead-Miami Speedway	(United States) Homestead, Florida	September 26	(Brazil) Nilton Rossoni	(United States) Todd Snyder	(United States) Todd Snyder
12	Watkins Glen International	(United States) Watkins Glen, New York	October 3	(Brazil) Nilton Rossoni	(Brazil) Nilton Rossoni	(Brazil) Nilton Rossoni

=== In season testing ===
The Barber Dodge Pro Series conducted a three-day test at the 1 mile oval of Phoenix International Raceway. It was the first time since 1996 the series visited an oval. It was the first time the in 1998 introduced Michelin shod Reynard 98E visited an oval track. Many drivers, such as Sepp Koster, had never driven on an oval before. John McCaig was the only driver who also competed in the 1996 Nazareth Speedway Barber Pro Series race. Defending series champion Jeff Simmons was the fastest driver over the three-day test driving an average lap of 129.042mph (207.67km/h). The test was a preparation for the 60-lap race at Nazareth where the series supported the First Union 200, a NASCAR Busch Grand National Series race.

Oval test
Track	Date	Fastest driver	Second fastest	Third fastest
Phoenix International Raceway	April 13	(United States) Townsend Bell (00:28.258)	(Venezuela) Juan Jose Font (00:28.288)	(United States) Jeff Simmons (00:28.349)
Phoenix International Raceway	April 14	(Mexico) Memo Rojas (00:28.241)	(United States) Jeff Simmons (00:28.289)	(Venezuela) Juan Jose Font (00:28.334)
Phoenix International Raceway	April 15	(United States) Jeff Simmons (00:27.898)	(United States) Townsend Bell (00:27.984)	(United States) Eric Tresslar (00:28.038)

== Final standings ==
Color	Result
Gold	Winner
Silver	2nd place
Bronze	3rd place
Green	4th & 5th place
Light Blue	6th–10th place
Dark Blue	11th place or lower
Purple	Did not finish
Red	Did not qualify (DNQ)
Brown	Withdrawn (Wth)
Black	Disqualified (DSQ)
White	Did not start (DNS)
Blank	Did not participate (DNP)
Blank	Driver replacement (Rpl)
Blank	Injured (Inj)
Blank	No race held (NH)

Rank	Driver	(United States) SEB	(United States) NAZ	(United States) LRP	(United States) POR	(United States) CLE	(United States) ROA	(United States) DET	(United States) MOH	(United States) GRA	(United States) LS	(United States) HMS	(United States) WGI	Points
1	(United States) Jeff Simmons	5	2	20	1	3	1	24	2	7	1	4	5	152
2	(United States) Todd Snyder	28	23	5	23	4	3	1	1	1	2	1	3	148
3	(United States) Townsend Bell	30	3	1	4	8	5	16	21	8	3	19	2	104
4	(United States) Jon Fogarty	14	18	9	6	7	4	22	5	3	5	2	10	98
5	(Netherlands) Sepp Koster	6	5	7	5	12	9	5	15	2	7	8	14	97
6	(Brazil) Nilton Rossoni	2	7	21	2	1	6	20	20	15	18	18	1	94
7	(United States) Jamie Menninga	9	21	6	13	6	21	3	8	4	8	10	4	90
8	(United States) Peter Boss	8	4	3	15	9	7	8	3	9	9	17	15	88
9	(United States) Roger Yasukawa	10	22	15	11	10	11	6	7	6	6	6	6	81
10	(Canada) Michael Valiante	3	15	8	22	2		18	4	5	19	7	8	79
11	(Switzerland) Iradj Alexander	27	12	17	20	2	19	2	6	18	4	5		69
12	(United States) Matt Plumb	12	11	11	7	14	8	7	22	14	24	3	9	65
13	(United States) Rocky Moran Jr.	1	1	4	12	21	14							61
14	(United States) Bryan Pelke	18	9	13	21	13	24	4	13	10	21			34
15	(Mexico) Memo Rojas	11	6	2	14	16	22	19						33
16	(Venezuela) Juan José Font	4	13	14	24	20	13	9	10					33
17	(Canada) John McCaig	21	17	10	9	5	23						7	33
18	(Brazil) Vanderlan Junior	7	16	18	3	15			11	16				29
19	(United States) R.B. Stiewing	13	20	23	16	18	16	12	14	12	12	12	13	24
20	(Brazil) Alexandre Sperafico				18	24	12	10	12	13	10	20	17	23
21	(Brazil) Rodrigo Bernandes				8	23	10	23	9					21
22	(Germany) Tim Bergmeister	19	10	22	10	11								17
23	(United States) Brent Sherman	23	19	16	17	17	15	11	16	17	16	11	12	15
24	(United States) Kip Gulseth					19	20	13	17	11	13	16	16	11
25	(Brazil) Andre Grilo	16	8	19										8
26	(Brazil) Andre Nicastro											9		7
27	(United States) Joshua Rehm	29											11	5
28	(United States) Jason LaPoint										11			5
29	(United States) Eric Tresslar	25	25	12										4
30	(United States) Brian Rivera											13		3
31	(Puerto Rico) Victor Gonzalez Jr.	15	14	DNS										3
32	(United States) Scott Mayer	26	24		19	22		14	18	18	19	22		2
33	(United States) Rhonda Trammell								19		14			2
34	(Italy) Luca Pazzaglia											14		2
35	(United States) David Francis Jr.							17			15	15		2
36	(United States) Aaron Bambach							15						1
	(Italy) Giovanni Anapoli	DNS												
	(United States) Jarrett Boon	22												
	(United States) Gregg Borland	17												
	(United States) Keith Dusko										17			
	(United States) Tom Fogarty										20			
	(Colombia) Diego Mejia	20												
	(United States) Jeff Morton							21						
	(United States) Dale Vandenbush						17							
	(United States) Jon Vannini										23			
	(United States) Charles Willis	24												
