= Jeff Simmons (racing driver) =

American racing driver

- Born: August 5, 1976 (age 50) Hartford, Connecticut, U.S.
- Relatives: Chris Simmons (brother)

IRL IndyCar Series
- Years active: 2004, 2006–2008
- Teams: Mo Nunn Racing; Patrick Racing; Rahal Letterman Racing; A. J. Foyt Enterprises
- Starts: 26
- Wins: 0
- Poles: 0
- Best finish: 16th in 2006

Previous series
- 2000, 2003–2006, 2008: Indy Lights

Awards
- 1999: Team USA Scholarship

Jeff Simmons (born August 5, 1976) is an American former race car driver who competed in the Indy Racing League.

== Early career ==
Born in Hartford and grew up in East Granby, Simmons began his professional career in the Barber Dodge Pro Series in 1998. In his first season, he won the rookie of the year and the series championship, becoming only the second rookie ever to win the title. The "Career Enhancement Award" of $250,000 that went with the title was not enough to secure him a ride at the next level, Indy Lights, so he returned to Barber Dodge in 1999. He successfully defended his championship and in so doing became the only person ever to win the championship twice. With two "Career Enhancement Awards" ($500,000) behind him he moved up to the Indy Lights with Team Green in 2000, finishing sevemth overall. When Michael Andretti joined Team Green to form Andretti Green Racing, the Indy Lights effort was disbanded. Simmons tested at the end of that year with the 2000 Indy Lights champs, PacWest Racing. However, Simmons’ lack of funding left him without a team for both 2001 and 2002. He made his return to racing in 2003 in the Infiniti Pro Series, leading his first race back and ultimately finishing second in the championship with two wins.

In 2004, Simmons once again lacked the sponsorship needed for a full-time ride, However, A. J. Foyt put him in his Infiniti Pro Series car at Indianapolis where the finished second. That led to Mo Nunn giving him a chance to qualify his second car for the Indianapolis 500, which he did, with just 37 laps ever in an IndyCar, and finished sixteenth in the race. He made one additional start that year for Patrick Racing after the retirement of Al Unser Jr. at Kansas Speedway. He put the Patrick car in the highest position it had seen all year and was set to record a top-ten when he was taken out by two of his competitors. Unable to find a ride in IndyCar for 2005, he returned to the Pro Series, finishing second in the series championship with four victories for Team ISI/Kenn Hardley Racing.

== IndyCar Series ==
Expecting another season in the Pro Series in 2006, those plans were turned upside down when Paul Dana was killed in a practice crash before the first IndyCar series race at Homestead-Miami Speedway on a weekend where Simmons won the IPS race.

Simmons was rewarded for his resilience when Rahal Letterman Racing announced April 4, 2006, he would drive the No. 17 Ethanol-sponsored Panoz–Honda effective April 22 in Motegi and was eligible to compete for the Rookie of the Year award, although he was no longer an Indy 500 rookie due to his start in 2004. He contested the remainder of the 2006 IRL IndyCar Series season and finished 16th in series points despite missing the first two races. His best finish in 2006 was seventh place at Nashville Superspeedway and Infineon Raceway.

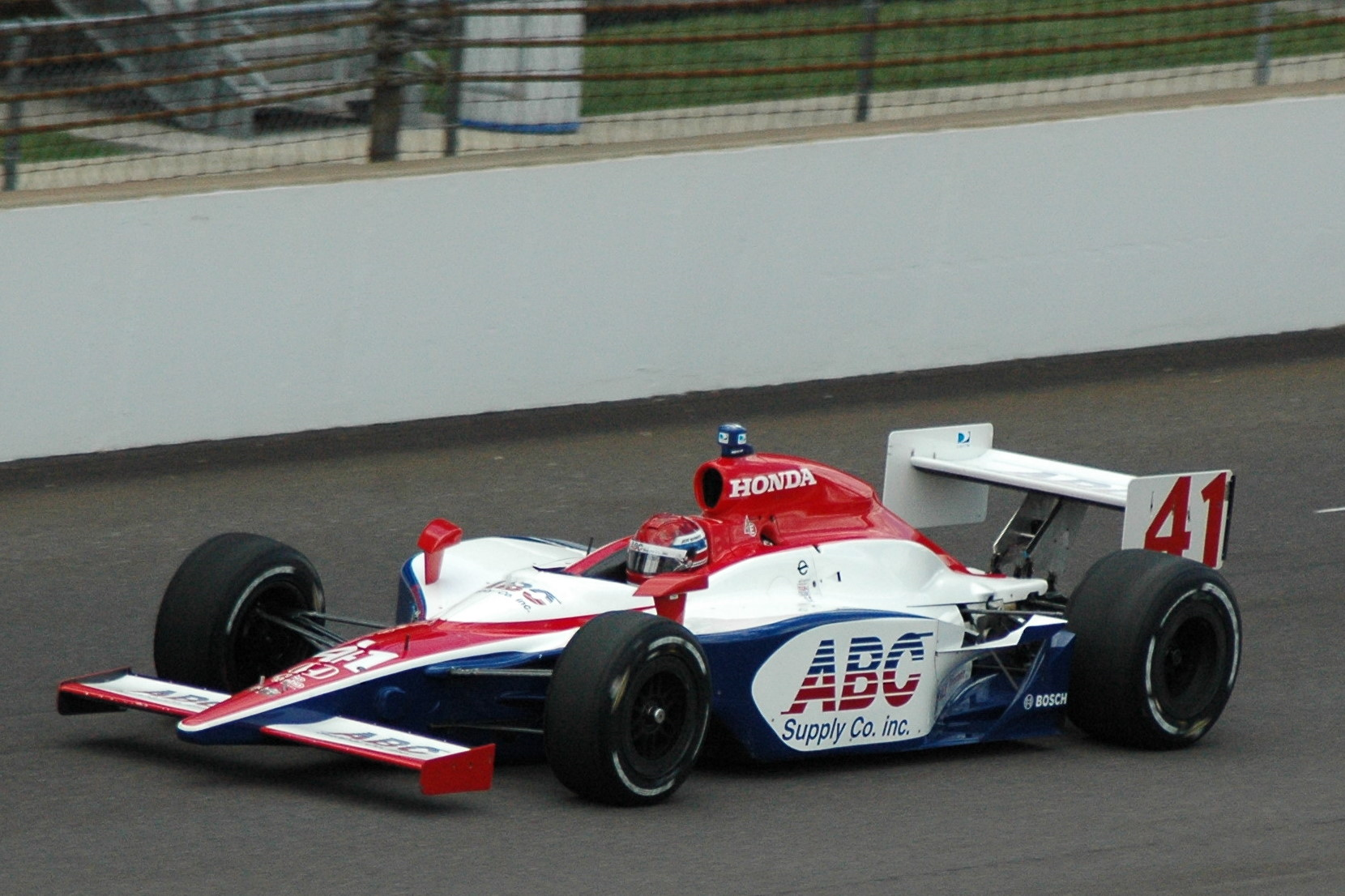
Simmons practicing his Foyt Enterprises #41 car for the 2008 Indianapolis 500

For the 2007 season, Simmons was joined at Rahal Letterman by IRL veteran Scott Sharp. The season saw the team hampered by engineering and mechanical issues ultimately resulting in a lawsuit by Sharp against the team and its owners. Simmons led the Indianapolis 500 that year and ran in the top-five most of the race until rain forced an early end to the event and Simmons to finish in eleventh. On July 19, after eleven races, Simmons was let go from the team, who replaced him with fellow American Ryan Hunter-Reay.

In February 2007, Simmons became engaged to WTHR Sunrise reporter, Stephanie Soviar. They were married in September of that year, but ended up getting divorced in April 2010.

Simmons returned to the Indy Lights Series (formerly the Indy Pro Series) at the beginning of the 2008 season, driving for Team Moore Racing. He was given a chance to return to the IndyCar Series, albeit temporarily, to drive a second entry for A. J. Foyt Enterprises in the 2008 Indianapolis 500 and qualified 24th. He quickly moved up the field in the race until a pit lane incident damaged the car. A mechanical failure finally sent him into the wall during a caution period, resulting in a 28th place finish.

== Motorsports Career Results ==
=== American open–wheel racing results ===
(key) (Races in bold indicate pole position)

==== Complete USF2000 National Championship results ====
Year	Entrant	1	2	3	4	5	6	7	8	9	10	11	12	Pos	Points
1997	Falcon Racing Services	WDW	STP	PIR	DSC1	DSC2	SAV	PPI	CHA1	CHA2	MID; 45	WGI; 5	WGI; 6	**N.C.**	**N.C.**

==== Barber Dodge Pro Series ====
Year	1	2	3	4	5	6	7	8	9	10	11	12	Rank	Points
1997	STP	SEB	SAV; 27	LRP	MOH	WGI; 10	MIN	MOH	ROA	LS; 7	REN	LS	???	???
1998	SEB	LRP; 10	**DET**; 1	**WGI**; 1	CLE; 3	GRA; 2	MOH; 26	ROA; 5	LS1; 2	**ATL**; 1	HMS; 2	LS2; 2	**1st**	**158**
1999	SEB; 5	NAZ; 2	LRP; 20	POR; 1	CLE; 3	**ROA**; 1	**DET**; 24	MOH; 2	GRA; 7	**LS**; 1	HMS; 4	WGI; 5	**1st**	**152**

==== Indy Lights / Indy Pro Series ====
Year	Team	1	2	3	4	5	6	7	8	9	10	11	12	13	14	15	16	Rank	Points
2000	Team KOOL Green	LBH; 4	MIL; 7	DET; 9	POR; 3	MIS; 15	CHI; 7	MOH; 6	VAN; 3	LS; 3	STL; 14	HOU; 11	FON; 6					7th	88
2003	Keith Duesenberg Racing	HMS; 14	PHX; 5	INDY; 4	**PPIR**; 2	KAN; 14	NSH; 4	MIS; 2	STL; 1	**KTY**; 1	CHI; 3	FON; 8	TXS; 2					2nd	407
2004	A. J. Foyt Enterprises	HMS	PHX	INDY; 2	KAN	NSH	MIL	MIS	KTY									12th	150
2004	Kenn Hardley Racing									**PPIR**; 9	CHI; 2	FON; 10	TXS; 6					12th	150
2005	Kenn Hardley Racing	HMS; 9	PHX; 12	STP; 12	INDY; 7	TXS; 8	IMS; 13	NSH; 2	MIL; 1	KTY; 5	PPIR; 1	SNM; 3	CHI; 1	WGL; 1	FON; 2			2nd	474
2006	Kenn Hardley Racing	HMS; 1	STP1; 2	STP2; 4	INDY	WGL	IMS	NSH	MIL	KTY	SNM1	SNM2	CHI					12th	122
2008	Team Moore Racing	HMS	STP1; 4	STP2; 19	KAN; 7	INDY; 8	MIL; 2	IOW; 6	WGL1; 3	WGL2; 6	NSH; 15	MOH1; 6	MOH2; 21	KTY; 23	SNM1	SNM2	CHI	13th	285
2010	Team E	STP	ALA	LBH	INDY; 15	IOW	WGL	TOR	EDM	MOH	SNM	CHI	KTY	HMS				34th	15

==== IndyCar Series ====
Year	Team	No.	1	2	3	4	5	6	7	8	9	10	11	12	13	14	15	16	17	18	19	Rank	Points	Ref
2004	Mo Nunn Racing	21	HMS	PHX	MOT	INDY; 16	TXS	RIR														29th	26	
2004	Patrick Racing	20							KAN; 19	NSH	MIL	MIS	KTY	PPIR	NZR	CHI	FON	TX2				29th	26	
2006	Rahal Letterman Racing	17	HMS	STP	MOT; 18	INDY; 23	WGL; 19	TXS; 15	RIR; 19	KAN; 10	NSH; 7	MIL; 9	MIS; 10	KTY; 14	SNM; 7	CHI; 8						16th	217	
2007	Rahal Letterman Racing	17	HMS; 17	STP; 14	MOT; 8	KAN; 10	INDY; 11	MIL; 10	TXS; 6	IOW; 17	RIR; 18	WGL; 10	NSH; 14	MOH	MIS	KTY	SNM	DET	CHI			18th	201	
2008	A. J. Foyt Enterprises	41	HMS	STP	MOT^{1}	LBH^{1}	KAN	INDY; 28	MIL	TXS	IOW	RIR	WGL	NSH	MOH	EDM	KTY	SNM	DET	CHI	SRF^{2}	39th	10	

^{1} Run on same day.
^{2} Non-points race.

Years	Teams	Races	Poles	Wins	Podiums (Non-win)	Top 10s (Non-podium)	Indianapolis 500 Wins	Championships
4	4	26	0	0	0	11	0	0

==== Indianapolis 500 ====
Year	Chassis	Engine	Start	Finish	Team
2004	Dallara	Toyota	29	16	Mo Nunn Racing
2006	Panoz	Honda	26	23	Rahal Letterman Racing
2007	Dallara	Honda	13	11	Rahal Letterman Racing
2008	Dallara	Honda	24	28	A. J. Foyt Enterprises

Sporting positions
Preceded by Derek Hill	Barber Dodge Pro Series Champion; 1998–1999	Succeeded by Nilton Rossoni
