= 2006 Auto Club 500 =

Second race of the 2006 NASCAR Nextel Cup Series

Race details
- Race 2 of 36 in the 2006 NASCAR Nextel Cup Series season
- 2006 Auto Club 500 program cover
- Date: February 26, 2006
- Official name: Auto Club 500
- Location: Auto Club Speedway; Fontana, California, U.S.
- Course: Permanent racing facility
- Course length: 2.0 miles (3.23 km)
- Distance: 251 laps, 502 mi (807.89 km)
- Scheduled distance: 250 laps, 500 mi (804.672 km)
- Weather: Temperatures reaching up to 75.2 °F (24.0 °C); wind speeds up to 8.9 miles per hour (14.3 km/h)
- Average speed: 147.852 miles per hour (237.945 km/h)

Pole position
Driver	Kurt Busch	Penske Racing
- Time: 38.485

Most laps led
Driver	Greg Biffle	Roush Racing
- Laps: 168

Winner
No. 17	Matt Kenseth	Roush Racing

Television in the United States
- Network: Fox
- Announcers: Mike Joy, Darrell Waltrip, and Larry McReynolds

The 2006 Auto Club 500 was the second race of the 2006 NASCAR Nextel Cup season. It was held on February 26, 2006 at Auto Club Speedway in Fontana, California.

== Qualifying ==
Pos	No.	Driver	Make	Speed	Time	Behind
1	2	Kurt Busch	Dodge	187.086	38.485	0.000
2	16	Greg Biffle	Ford	186.186	38.671	-0.186
3	48	Jimmie Johnson	Chevrolet	185.735	38.765	-0.280
4	18	J. J. Yeley	Chevrolet	185.180	38.881	-0.396
5	11	Denny Hamlin	Chevrolet	184.919	38.936	-0.451
6	31	Jeff Burton	Chevrolet	184.871	38.946	-0.461
7	5	Kyle Busch	Chevrolet	184.800	38.961	-0.476
8	1	Joe Nemechek	Chevrolet	184.758	38.970	-0.485
9	24	Jeff Gordon	Chevrolet	184.720	38.978	-0.493
10	6	Mark Martin	Ford	184.450	39.035	-0.550
11	12	Ryan Newman	Dodge	184.318	39.063	-0.578
12	20	Tony Stewart	Chevrolet	184.303	39.066	-0.581
13	9	Kasey Kahne	Dodge	184.219	39.084	-0.599
14	10	Scott Riggs	Dodge	184.209	39.086	-0.601
15	29	Kevin Harvick	Chevrolet	184.195	39.089	-0.604
16	38	Elliott Sadler	Ford	183.767	39.180	-0.695
17	14	Sterling Marlin	Chevrolet	183.613	39.213	-0.728
18	8	Dale Earnhardt Jr.	Chevrolet	183.570	39.222	-0.737
19	88	Dale Jarrett	Ford	183.566	39.223	-0.738
20	42	Casey Mears	Dodge	183.524	39.232	-0.747
21	19	Jeremy Mayfield	Dodge	183.397	39.259	-0.774
22	99	Carl Edwards	Ford	183.360	39.267	-0.782
23	1	Martin Truex Jr.	Chevrolet	183.173	39.307	-0.822
24	22	Dave Blaney	Dodge	183.155	39.311	-0.826
25	26	Jamie McMurray	Ford	183.090	39.325	-0.840
26	66	Jeff Green	Chevrolet	183.020	39.340	-0.855
27	43	Bobby Labonte	Dodge	183.020	39.340	-0.855
28	25	Brian Vickers	Chevrolet	182.913	39.363	-0.878
29	41	Reed Sorenson	Dodge	182.820	39.383	-0.898
30	95	Stanton Barrett	Chevrolet	182.801	39.387	-0.902
31	17	Matt Kenseth	Ford	182.588	39.433	-0.948
32	7	Clint Bowyer	Chevrolet	182.486	39.455	-0.970
33	55	Michael Waltrip	Dodge	182.454	39.462	-0.977
34	7	Robby Gordon	Chevrolet	182.380	39.478	-0.993
35	51	Mike Garvey	Chevrolet	182.320	39.491	-1.006
36	78	Kenny Wallace	Chevrolet	182.306	39.494	-1.009
37	61	Kevin Lepage	Ford	182.242	39.508	-1.023
38	4	Scott Wimmer	Chevrolet	182.007	39.559	-1.074
39	45	Kyle Petty	Dodge	181.461	39.678	-1.193
41	40	David Stremme	Dodge	181.005	39.778	-1.293
41	21	Ken Schrader	Ford	179.341	40.147	-1.662
42	49	Brent Sherman	Dodge	178.169	40.411	-1.926
43	96	Terry Labonte	Chevrolet	181.059	39.766	-1.281
Failed to qualify or withdrew
44	32	Travis Kvapil	Chevrolet			
45	00	Hermie Sadler	Ford			
46	74	Derrike Cope	Dodge			
47	34	Randy LaJoie	Dodge			
48	89	Morgan Shepherd	Dodge			
WD	50	Jimmy Spencer	Dodge			

== Summary ==
Body styles and engines were the story of the second race of the Nextel Cup season. Kurt Busch won the pole (187.086 mph) using a 2004 Dodge Intrepid-styled body, as opposed to the new Dodge Charger, which his Penske Racing team believed was aerodynamically superior. Penske teammate Ryan Newman and the #12 team alongside Bobby Labonte and the #43 team ran the Intrepid as well. Others, including Evernham Motorsports drivers Jeremy Mayfield and Kasey Kahne, drove the Charger.

On race day, Greg Biffle dominated, leading 168 of the first 218 laps. Biffle won last year's spring race at California, finished second in the fall, and had won the Busch race the day before. Tony Stewart was the fastest Chevy in the early going. He overcame the car falling off the jack on a pit stop and an unscheduled stop for a flat tire to claw his way back among the leaders only to have an engine failure at lap 215, ending a string of 30 straight races without a DNF. Biffle continued up front until lap 226. He reported to the crew that his engine had lost a cylinder and a few laps later, he retired to the garage. This left Matt Kenseth to take the lead and only a late-race caution kept him from pulling away. Smoke and oil from the #4 car of Scott Wimmer brought out a yellow with three laps to go. Kenseth easily held off Jimmie Johnson in the green-white-checker finish to earn his 11th career win.

== Race results ==
Fin	St	No.	Driver	Make	Points	Bonus	Laps	Winnings
1	31	17	Matt Kenseth	Ford	185	5	251	$324,991
2	3	48	Jimmie Johnson	Chevrolet	170		251	$235,936
3	22	99	Carl Edwards	Ford	165		251	$165,550
4	13	9	Kasey Kahne	Dodge	165	5	251	$166,239
5	6	31	Jeff Burton	Chevrolet	155		251	$158,970
6	25	26	Jamie McMurray	Ford	150		251	$142,375
7	20	42	Casey Mears	Dodge	146		251	$140,858
8	4	18	J. J. Yeley *	Chevrolet	147	5	251	$140,075
9	10	6	Mark Martin	Ford	143	5	251	$104,800
10	7	5	Kyle Busch	Chevrolet	134		251	$105,225
11	18	8	Dale Earnhardt Jr.	Chevrolet	135	5	251	$132,366
12	5	11	Denny Hamlin *	Chevrolet	127		251	$104,575
13	9	24	Jeff Gordon	Chevrolet	129	5	251	$127,261
14	32	7	Clint Bowyer *	Chevrolet	121		251	$100,425
15	23	1	Martin Truex Jr. *	Chevrolet	118		251	$114,383
16	1	2	Kurt Busch	Dodge	120	5	251	$144,558
17	19	88	Dale Jarrett	Ford	112		251	$133,050
18	28	25	Brian Vickers	Chevrolet	109		250	$97,625
19	14	10	Scott Riggs	Dodge	106		250	$88,925
20	11	12	Ryan Newman	Dodge	103		250	$132,683
21	29	41	Reed Sorenson *	Dodge	100		250	$97,875
22	21	19	Jeremy Mayfield	Dodge	97		250	$116,916
23	16	38	Elliott Sadler	Ford	94		250	$115,083
24	26	66	Jeff Green	Chevrolet	91		250	$121,058
25	39	45	Kyle Petty	Dodge	88		250	$107,333
26	34	7	Robby Gordon	Chevrolet	85		249	$95,075
27	8	1	Joe Nemechek	Chevrolet	82		249	$109,820
28	41	21	Ken Schrader	Ford	79		249	$109,589
29	15	29	Kevin Harvick	Chevrolet	76		249	$116,611
30	24	22	Dave Blaney	Dodge	73		249	$91,583
31	27	43	Bobby Labonte	Dodge	70		249	$116,186
32	17	14	Sterling Marlin	Chevrolet	67		249	$88,592
33	40	40	David Stremme *	Dodge	64		248	$87,775
34	43	96	Terry Labonte	Chevrolet	61		248	$78,625
35	37	61	Kevin Lepage	Ford	58		248	$78,425
36	33	55	Michael Waltrip	Dodge	55		247	$78,275
37	42	49	Brent Sherman *	Dodge	52		247	$78,050
38	35	151	Mike Garvey	Chevrolet	49		247	$77,800
39	38	4	Scott Wimmer	Chevrolet	46		246	$77,680
40	30	195	Stanton Barrett	Chevrolet	43		242	$77,525
41	36	178	Kenny Wallace	Chevrolet	40		237	$77,400
42	2	16	Greg Biffle	Ford	47	10	229	$106,005
43	12	20	Tony Stewart	Chevrolet	39	5	214	$119,453

Failed to qualify: Travis Kvapil (#32), Hermie Sadler (#00), Derrike Cope (#74), Randy LaJoie (#34), Morgan Shepherd (#89)

Previous race: 2006 Daytona 500	Nextel Cup Series; 2006 season	Next race: 2006 UAW-DaimlerChrysler 400
