= 2013 Toyota/Save Mart 350 =

Race details
- Race 16 of 36 in the 2013 NASCAR Sprint Cup Series
- The 2013 Toyota/Save Mart 350 program cover.
- Date: June 23, 2013
- Location: Sonoma Raceway, Sonoma, California, United States
- Course: Permanent racing facility
- Course length: 1.99 miles (3.2 km)
- Distance: 110 laps, 218.9 mi (352.3 km)
- Weather: Clear with a high temperature around 85 °F (29 °C); wind out of the SW at 16 miles per hour (26 km/h).
- Average speed: 76.658 mph (123.369 km/h)

Pole position
Driver	Jamie McMurray	Earnhardt Ganassi Racing
- Time: 75.422 seconds

Most laps led
Driver	Martin Truex Jr.	Michael Waltrip Racing
- Laps: 51

Winner
No. 56	Martin Truex Jr.	Michael Waltrip Racing

Television in the United States
- Network: TNT
- Announcers: Adam Alexander, Wally Dallenbach Jr. and Kyle Petty
- Nielsen ratings: 3.0/7 (4.660 million viewers)

The 2013 Toyota/Save Mart 350 was a NASCAR Sprint Cup Series stock car race held on June 23, 2013, at Sonoma Raceway in Sonoma, California, United States. Contested over 110 laps on the 1.99-mile (3.2 km) road course, it was the sixteenth race of the 2013 Sprint Cup Series championship, and the first of two road course competitions on the schedule. Martin Truex Jr. of Michael Waltrip Racing won the race, breaking a 218-race winless streak stretching back to June 2007, while Jeff Gordon finished second. Carl Edwards, Kurt Busch, and Clint Bowyer rounded out the top five. The top rookie of the race was Ricky Stenhouse Jr. who finished 27th.

== Report ==
=== Background ===
The layout of Sonoma Raceway NASCAR used.

Sonoma Raceway is one of two road courses to hold NASCAR races, the other being Watkins Glen International. The standard road course at Sonoma Raceway is a 12-turn course that is 2.52 miles (4.06 km) long; the track was modified in 1998, adding the Chute, which bypassed turns 5 and 6, shortening the course to 1.95 miles (3.14 km). The Chute was only used for NASCAR events such as this race, and was criticized by many drivers, who preferred the full layout. In 2001, it was replaced with a 70-degree turn, 4A, bringing the track to its current dimensions of 1.99 miles (3.20 km). Clint Bowyer was the defending race winner after winning the race in 2012.

Seven teams chose to temporarily replace their regular drivers with road course ringers. Humphrey Smith Racing chose Alex Kennedy to drive the No. 19 Toyota, while Circle Sport chose Ron Fellows to drive their No. 33 Chevrolet. Tommy Baldwin Racing (TBR) selected Victor Gonzalez Jr. to drive the No. 36 Chevrolet, making Gonzalez Jr. the first Caribbean driver to race in the Sprint Cup Series. TBR also chose Justin Marks to drive the No. 7. Brian Keselowski chose Drive for Diversity graduate Paulie Harraka to drive the No. 52 Ford, while NEMCO-Jay Robinson Racing selected Tomy Drissi to drive their No. 87 car, replacing Joe Nemechek. Boris Said competed during the race in the No. 32 FAS Lane Racing Ford. Jacques Villeneuve, the 1995 Indianapolis 500 winner and 1997 Formula One World Champion, was selected by Phoenix Racing to drive the No. 51 as well. Jason Bowles was tabbed by Michael Waltrip Racing to pilot the No. 55 in place of Brian Vickers in practice and qualifying due to Vickers participating in the Johnsonville Sausage 200 at Road America.

Before the race, Jimmie Johnson was leading the Drivers' Championship with 538 points, while Carl Edwards stood in second with 507 points. Bowyer followed in the third with 489, thirteen points ahead of Kevin Harvick and thirty-three ahead of Matt Kenseth in fourth and fifth. Kyle Busch, with 452, was in sixth; five ahead of Dale Earnhardt Jr., who was scored seventh. Eighth-placed Greg Biffle was thirteen points ahead of Brad Keselowski and twenty-six ahead of Tony Stewart in ninth and tenth. Paul Menard was eleventh with 415, while Kasey Kahne completed the first twelve positions with 407 points. In the Manufacturers' Championship, Chevrolet was leading with 107 points, fifteen points ahead of Toyota. Ford was third after recording only 79 points before the race.

For the first time, Amtrak ran a special train from Sacramento to the race on trackage that had never seen a passenger train. The train was run using Capitol Corridor equipment. 500 fans total rode the train.

=== Entry list ===
(R) - Denotes rookie driver.

(i) - Denotes driver who is ineligible for series driver points.

No.	Driver	Team	Manufacturer
1	Jamie McMurray	Earnhardt Ganassi Racing	Chevrolet
2	Brad Keselowski	Penske Racing	Ford
5	Kasey Kahne	Hendrick Motorsports	Chevrolet
7	Justin Marks	Tommy Baldwin Racing	Chevrolet
9	Marcos Ambrose	Richard Petty Motorsports	Ford
10	Danica Patrick (R)	Stewart–Haas Racing	Chevrolet
11	Denny Hamlin	Joe Gibbs Racing	Toyota
13	Casey Mears	Germain Racing	Ford
14	Tony Stewart	Stewart–Haas Racing	Chevrolet
15	Clint Bowyer	Michael Waltrip Racing	Toyota
16	Greg Biffle	Roush Fenway Racing	Ford
17	Ricky Stenhouse Jr. (R)	Roush Fenway Racing	Ford
18	Kyle Busch	Joe Gibbs Racing	Toyota
19	Alex Kennedy	Humphrey Smith Racing	Toyota
20	Matt Kenseth	Joe Gibbs Racing	Toyota
22	Joey Logano	Penske Racing	Ford
24	Jeff Gordon	Hendrick Motorsports	Chevrolet
27	Paul Menard	Richard Childress Racing	Chevrolet
29	Kevin Harvick	Richard Childress Racing	Chevrolet
30	David Stremme	Swan Racing	Toyota
31	Jeff Burton	Richard Childress Racing	Chevrolet
32	Boris Said	FAS Lane Racing	Ford
33	Ron Fellows	Circle Sport	Chevrolet
34	David Ragan	Front Row Motorsports	Ford
35	Josh Wise (i)	Front Row Motorsports	Ford
36	Victor Gonzalez Jr.	Tommy Baldwin Racing	Chevrolet
37	J. J. Yeley	Max Q Motorsports	Chevrolet
38	David Gilliland	Front Row Motorsports	Ford
39	Ryan Newman	Stewart–Haas Racing	Chevrolet
42	Juan Pablo Montoya	Earnhardt Ganassi Racing	Chevrolet
43	Aric Almirola	Richard Petty Motorsports	Ford
47	Bobby Labonte	JTG Daugherty Racing	Toyota
48	Jimmie Johnson	Hendrick Motorsports	Chevrolet
51	Jacques Villeneuve	Phoenix Racing	Chevrolet
52	Paulie Harraka (i)	Brian Keselowski Motorsports	Ford
55	Brian Vickers (i)	Michael Waltrip Racing	Toyota
56	Martin Truex Jr.	Michael Waltrip Racing	Toyota
78	Kurt Busch	Furniture Row Racing	Chevrolet
83	David Reutimann	BK Racing	Toyota
87	Tomy Drissi	NEMCO-Jay Robinson Racing	Toyota
88	Dale Earnhardt Jr.	Hendrick Motorsports	Chevrolet
93	Travis Kvapil	BK Racing	Toyota
99	Carl Edwards	Roush Fenway Racing	Ford
Official entry list

=== Practice and qualifying ===
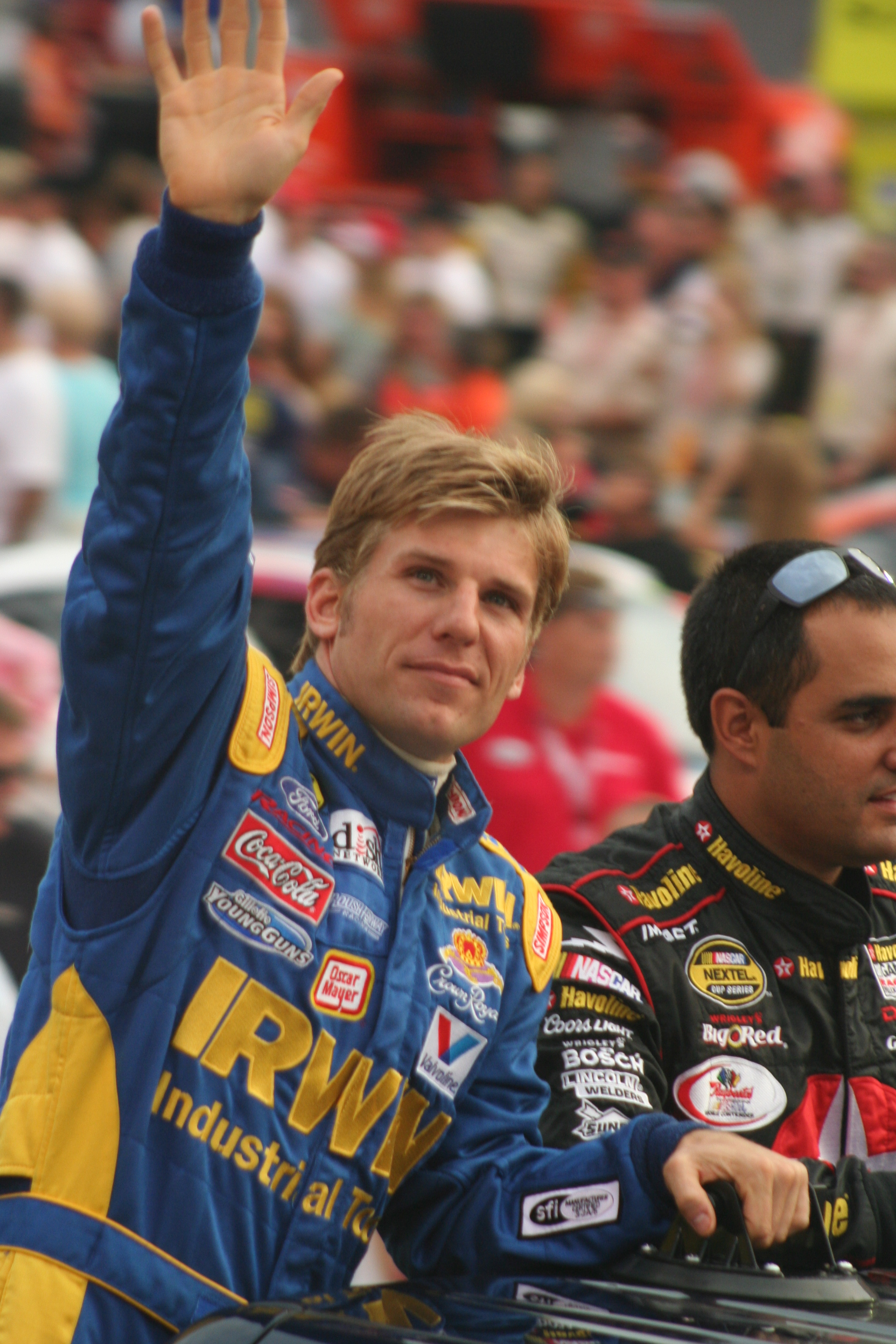
Jamie McMurray won the pole position.

Two practice sessions were held on June 21 in preparation for the race. The first session was 105 minutes, while second session was 90 minutes long.

During the first practice session, Marcos Ambrose, for the Richard Petty Motorsports team, was quickest ahead of Juan Pablo Montoya in second and Casey Mears in third. Kurt Busch was scored fourth, and Jamie McMurray managed fifth. Biffle, Keselowski, Bowyer, Martin Truex Jr., and Joey Logano rounded out the top ten quickest drivers in the session. Bowyer had the quickest ten consecutive lap average with an average speed of 92.404 miles per hour (148.710 km/h). In the final practice session for the race, Bowyer was quickest with a time of 75.765 seconds. McMurray followed in second, ahead of Kyle Busch and Edwards in third and fourth. Montoya, who was second quickest in second practice, could only manage fifth.

Starting with this race, NASCAR changed qualifying procedures for Sprint Cup races held on the road courses. Rather than having one car attempt to qualify at a time, groups of either five or six cars were released in five-second intervals and had a five-minute time limit to complete their runs. McMurray clinched his ninth career pole position, with a lap time of 75.422 seconds and a speed of 94.986 miles per hour (152.865 km/h). He was joined on the front row of the grid by Ambrose. Edwards qualified third, Biffle took fourth, and Bowyer started fifth. Kenseth, Kurt Busch, Logano, Kyle Busch, and Jeff Gordon completed the first ten positions on the grid.

==== Qualifying order ====
Group 1

No.	Driver	Team	Manufacturer
30	David Stremme	Swan Racing Company	Toyota
36	Victor Gonzalez Jr.	Tommy Baldwin Racing	Chevy
7	Justin Marks	Tommy Baldwin Racing	Chevy
52	Paulie Harraka	Brian Keselowski Motorsports	Ford
37	J. J. Yeley	Max Q Motorsports	Chevy
87	Tomy Drissi	NEMCO-Jay Robinson Racing	Toyota

Group 2

No.	Driver	Team	Manufacturer
34	David Ragan	Front Row Motorsports	Ford
38	David Gilliland	Front Row Motorsports	Ford
32	Boris Said	FAS Lane Racing	Ford
83	David Reutimann	BK Racing	Toyota
35	Josh Wise	Front Row Motorsports	Ford
19	Alex Kennedy	Humphrey Smith Motorsports	Toyota

Group 3

No.	Driver	Team	Manufacturer
33	Ron Fellows	Circle Sport	Chevy
88	Dale Earnhardt Jr.	Hendrick Motorsports	Chevy
55	Jason Bowles (for Brian Vickers)	Michael Waltrip Racing	Toyota
17	Ricky Stenhouse Jr.	Roush Fenway Racing	Ford
51	Jacques Villeneuve	Phoenix Racing	Chevy
10	Danica Patrick	Stewart–Haas Racing	Chevy

Group 4

No.	Driver	Team	Manufacturer
48	Jimmie Johnson	Hendrick Motorsports	Chevy
31	Jeff Burton	Richard Childress Racing	Chevy
93	Travis Kvapil	BK Racing	Toyota
47	Bobby Labonte	JTG Daugherty Racing	Toyota
43	Aric Almirola	Richard Petty Motorsports	Ford

Group 5

No.	Driver	Team	Manufacturer
39	Ryan Newman	Stewart–Haas Racing	Chevy
20	Matt Kenseth	Joe Gibbs Racing	Toyota
18	Kyle Busch	Joe Gibbs Racing	Toyota
99	Carl Edwards	Roush Fenway Racing	Ford
5	Kasey Kahne	Hendrick Motorsports	Chevy

Group 6

No.	Driver	Team	Manufacturer
24	Jeff Gordon	Hendrick Motorsports	Chevy
29	Kevin Harvick	Richard Childress Racing	Chevy
11	Denny Hamlin	Joe Gibbs Racing	Toyota
14	Tony Stewart	Stewart–Haas Racing	Chevy
27	Paul Menard	Richard Childress Racing	Chevy

Group 7

No.	Driver	Team	Manufacturer
16	Greg Biffle	Roush Fenway Racing	Ford
2	Brad Keselowski	Penske Racing	Ford
15	Clint Bowyer	Michael Waltrip Racing	Toyota
56	Martin Truex Jr.	Michael Waltrip Racing	Toyota
22	Joey Logano	Penske Racing	Ford

Group 8

No.	Driver	Team	Manufacturer
9	Marcos Ambrose	Richard Petty Motorsports	Ford
42	Juan Pablo Montoya	Earnhardt Ganassi Racing	Chevy
13	Casey Mears	Germain Racing	Ford
78	Kurt Busch	Furniture Row Racing	Chevy
1	Jamie McMurray	Earnhardt Ganassi Racing	Chevy

== Results ==
=== Qualifying ===
Grid	No.	Driver	Team	Manufacturer	Time	Speed
1	1	Jamie McMurray	Earnhardt Ganassi Racing	Chevrolet	75.422	94.986
2	9	Marcos Ambrose	Richard Petty Motorsports	Ford	75.471	94.924
3	99	Carl Edwards	Roush Fenway Racing	Ford	75.586	94.779
4	16	Greg Biffle	Roush Fenway Racing	Ford	75.592	94.772
5	15	Clint Bowyer	Michael Waltrip Racing	Toyota	75.620	94.737
6	20	Matt Kenseth	Joe Gibbs Racing	Toyota	75.711	94.623
7	78	Kurt Busch	Furniture Row Racing	Chevrolet	75.750	94.574
8	22	Joey Logano	Penske Racing	Ford	75.788	94.527
9	18	Kyle Busch	Joe Gibbs Racing	Toyota	75.933	94.346
10	24	Jeff Gordon	Hendrick Motorsports	Chevrolet	75.943	94.334
11	14	Tony Stewart	Stewart–Haas Racing	Chevrolet	76.010	94.251
12	29	Kevin Harvick	Richard Childress Racing	Chevrolet	76.039	94.215
13	42	Juan Pablo Montoya	Earnhardt Ganassi Racing	Chevrolet	76.039	94.215
14	56	Martin Truex Jr.	Michael Waltrip Racing	Toyota	76.200	94.016
15	5	Kasey Kahne	Hendrick Motorsports	Chevrolet	76.401	93.768
16	27	Paul Menard	Richard Childress Racing	Ford	76.464	93.691
17	11	Denny Hamlin	Joe Gibbs Racing	Toyota	76.465	93.690
18	2	Brad Keselowski	Penske Racing	Ford	76.470	93.684
19	48	Jimmie Johnson	Hendrick Motorsports	Chevrolet	76.471	93.683
20	47	Bobby Labonte	JTG Daugherty Racing	Toyota	76.483	93.668
21	13	Casey Mears	Germain Racing	Ford	76.555	93.580
22	51	Jacques Villeneuve	Phoenix Racing	Chevrolet	76.576	93.554
23	34	David Ragan	Front Row Motorsports	Ford	76.592	93.535
24	32	Boris Said	FAS Lane Racing	Ford	76.642	93.474
25	33	Ron Fellows	Circle Sport	Chevrolet	76.650	93.464
26	88	Dale Earnhardt Jr.	Hendrick Motorsports	Chevrolet	76.686	93.420
27	31	Jeff Burton	Richard Childress Racing	Chevrolet	76.784	93.301
28	30	David Stremme	Swan Racing	Toyota	76.819	93.258
29	38	David Gilliland	Front Row Motorsports	Ford	76.829	93.246
30	39	Ryan Newman	Stewart–Haas Racing	Chevrolet	76.878	93.187
31	10	Danica Patrick	Stewart–Haas Racing	Chevrolet	76.922	93.133
32	43	Aric Almirola	Richard Petty Motorsports	Ford	77.001	93.038
33	93	Travis Kvapil	BK Racing	Toyota	77.169	92.835
34	55	Brian Vickers	Michael Waltrip Racing	Toyota	77.224	92.769
35	35	Josh Wise	Front Row Motorsports	Ford	77.240	92.750
36	7	Justin Marks	Tommy Baldwin Racing	Chevrolet	77.360	92.606
37	17	Ricky Stenhouse Jr.	Roush Fenway Racing	Ford	77.445	92.504
38	83	David Reutimann	BK Racing	Toyota	77.590	92.331
39	19	Alex Kennedy	Humphrey Smith Racing	Toyota	78.271	91.528
40	52	Paulie Harraka	Brian Keselowski Motorsports	Ford	78.367	91.416
41	87	Tomy Drissi	NEMCO-Jay Robinson Racing	Toyota	79.051	90.625
42	36	Victor Gonzalez Jr.	Tommy Baldwin Racing	Chevrolet	—N/a	—N/a
43	37	J. J. Yeley	Tommy Baldwin Racing	Chevrolet	80.143	89.390

=== Race results ===
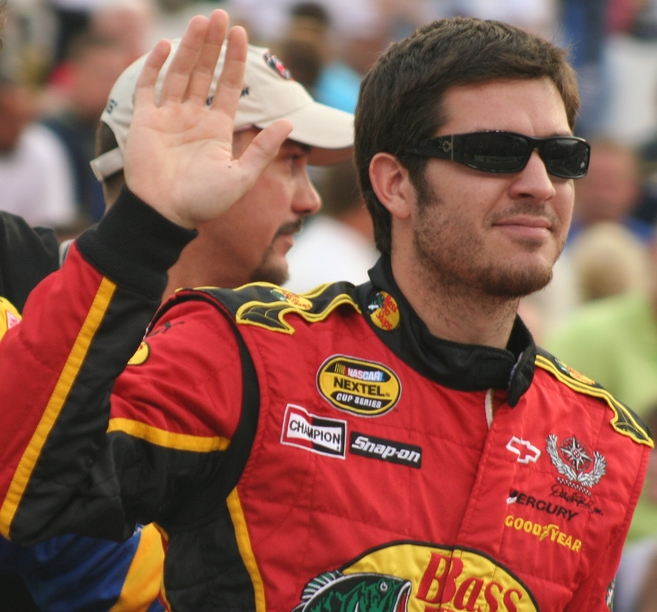
Martin Truex Jr. won the race, the second of his career.

Pos	No.	Driver	Team	Manufacturer	Laps	Led	Points^{1}
1	56	Martin Truex Jr.	Michael Waltrip Racing	Toyota	110	51	48
2	24	Jeff Gordon	Hendrick Motorsports	Chevrolet	110	4	43
3	99	Carl Edwards	Roush Fenway Racing	Ford	110	0	41
4	78	Kurt Busch	Furniture Row Racing	Chevrolet	110	15	41
5	15	Clint Bowyer	Michael Waltrip Racing	Toyota	110	0	39
6	5	Kasey Kahne	Hendrick Motorsports	Chevrolet	110	0	38
7	9	Marcos Ambrose	Richard Petty Motorsports	Ford	110	18	38
8	16	Greg Biffle	Roush Fenway Racing	Ford	110	0	36
9	48	Jimmie Johnson	Hendrick Motorsports	Chevrolet	110	0	35
10	29	Kevin Harvick	Richard Childress Racing	Chevrolet	110	0	34
11	22	Joey Logano	Penske Racing	Ford	110	10	34
12	88	Dale Earnhardt Jr.	Hendrick Motorsports	Chevrolet	110	0	32
13	55	Brian Vickers	Michael Waltrip Racing	Toyota	110	3	–
14	27	Paul Menard	Richard Childress Racing	Chevrolet	110	0	30
15	39	Ryan Newman	Stewart–Haas Racing	Chevrolet	110	0	29
16	13	Casey Mears	Germain Racing	Ford	110	0	28
17	93	Travis Kvapil	BK Racing	Toyota	110	0	27
18	32	Boris Said	FAS Lane Racing	Ford	110	0	26
19	20	Matt Kenseth	Joe Gibbs Racing	Toyota	110	0	25
20	43	Aric Almirola	Richard Petty Motorsports	Ford	110	0	24
21	2	Brad Keselowski	Penske Racing	Ford	110	7	24
22	33	Ron Fellows	Circle Sport	Chevrolet	110	0	22
23	11	Denny Hamlin	Joe Gibbs Racing	Toyota	110	0	21
24	38	David Gilliland	Front Row Motorsports	Ford	110	0	20
25	1	Jamie McMurray	Earnhardt Ganassi Racing	Chevrolet	110	2	20
26	83	David Reutimann	BK Racing	Chevrolet	110	0	18
27	17	Ricky Stenhouse Jr.	Roush Fenway Racing	Ford	110	0	17
28	14	Tony Stewart	Stewart–Haas Racing	Chevrolet	110	0	16
29	10	Danica Patrick	Stewart–Haas Racing	Chevrolet	110	0	15
30	7	Justin Marks	Tommy Baldwin Racing	Chevrolet	110	0	14
31	31	Jeff Burton	Richard Childress Racing	Chevrolet	110	0	13
32	35	Josh Wise	Front Row Motorsports	Ford	110	0	12
33	34	David Ragan	Front Row Motorsports	Ford	110	0	11
34	42	Juan Pablo Montoya	Earnhardt Ganassi Racing	Chevrolet	110	0	10
35	18	Kyle Busch	Joe Gibbs Racing	Toyota	109	0	9
36	30	David Stremme	Swan Racing	Toyota	109	0	8
37	36	Victor Gonzalez Jr.	Tommy Baldwin Racing	Chevrolet	109	0	7
38	87	Tomy Drissi	NEMCO-Jay Robinson Racing	Toyota	108	0	6
39	52	Paulie Harraka	Brian Keselowski Motorsports	Ford	89	0	5
40	19	Alex Kennedy	Humphrey Smith Racing	Toyota	30	0	4
41	51	Jacques Villeneuve	Phoenix Racing	Chevrolet	19	0	3
42	37	J. J. Yeley	Tommy Baldwin Racing	Chevrolet	7	0	PE
43	47	Bobby Labonte	JTG Daugherty Racing	Toyota	0	0	1

Notes

^1 Points include 3 Chase for the Sprint Cup points for winning, 1 point for leading a lap, and 1 point for most laps led.

== Standings after the race ==
Drivers' Championship standings

Pos	Driver	Points
1	Jimmie Johnson	573
2	Carl Edwards	548 (–25)
3	Clint Bowyer	528 (–45)
4	Kevin Harvick	510 (–63)
5	Matt Kenseth	481 (–92)

Manufacturers' Championship standings

Pos	Manufacturer	Points
1	Chevrolet	113
2	Toyota	101 (-12)
3	Ford	83 (-30)

- Note: Only the first twelve positions are included for the driver standings.

Previous race: 2013 Quicken Loans 400	Sprint Cup Series; 2013 season	Next race: 2013 Quaker State 400
