= 1998 Barber Dodge Pro Series =

Motorsport season

1998 Barber Dodge Pro Series season

Seasons
- ← 1997 1999 →

The 1998 Barber Dodge Pro Series season was the thirteenth season of the series. For this season the Dodge powered Reynard 98E was introduced. Michelin had become the sole tyre supplier.

== Race calendar and results ==
Round	Circuit	Location	Date	Pole position	Fastest lap	Winning driver
1	Sebring International Raceway	(United States) Sebring, Florida	March 21	(Netherlands) Sepp Koster	(United States) Todd Snyder	(United States) Todd Snyder
2	Lime Rock Park	(United States) Lime Rock, Connecticut	May 25	(France) Nicolas Rondet	(United States) Jeff Simmons	(Norway) Thomas Schie
3	Detroit Belle Isle Grand Prix	(United States) Detroit, Michigan	June 7	(United States) Jeff Simmons	(United States) Jeff Simmons	(United States) Jeff Simmons
4	Watkins Glen International	(United States) Watkins Glen, New York	June 28	(United States) Jeff Simmons	not awarded	(United States) Jeff Simmons
5	Burke Lakefront Airport	(United States) Cleveland, Ohio	July 12	(Brazil) Nilton Rossoni	(United States) Todd Snyder	(Norway) Thomas Schie
6	West Michigan Grand Prix	(United States) Grand Rapids, Michigan	July 26	(Puerto Rico) Victor Gonzalez Jr.	(United States) Jeff Simmons	(United States) Will Langhorne
7	Mid-Ohio Sports Car Course	(United States) Lexington, Ohio	August 9	(Norway) Thomas Schie	(United States) Rocky Moran Jr.	(United States) Jon Fogarty
8	Road America	(United States) Elkhart Lake, Wisconsin	August 16	(Brazil) Nilton Rossoni	(Brazil) Nilton Rossoni	(Brazil) Nilton Rossoni
9	Mazda Raceway Laguna Seca	(United States) Monterey County, California	September 13	(United States) Todd Snyder	(United States) Rocky Moran Jr.	(United States) Todd Snyder
10	Road Atlanta	(United States) Braselton, Georgia	October 10	(United States) Jeff Simmons	(United States) Jeff Simmons	(United States) Jeff Simmons
11	Homestead-Miami Speedway	(United States) Homestead, Florida	October 18	(United States) Alex Gurney	(Brazil) Nilton Rossoni	(Brazil) Nilton Rossoni
12	Mazda Raceway Laguna Seca	(United States) Monterey County, California	October 25	(United States) Will Langhorne	(Lebanon) Samer Hindi	(United States) Todd Snyder

== Final standings ==
Color	Result
Gold	Winner
Silver	2nd place
Bronze	3rd place
Green	4th & 5th place
Light Blue	6th–10th place
Dark Blue	11th place or lower
Purple	Did not finish
Red	Did not qualify (DNQ)
Brown	Withdrawn (Wth)
Black	Disqualified (DSQ)
White	Did not start (DNS)
Blank	Did not participate (DNP)
Blank	Driver replacement (Rpl)
Blank	Injured (Inj)
Blank	No race held (NH)

Rank	Driver	(United States) SEB	(United States) LRP	(United States) DET	(United States) WGI	(United States) CLE	(United States) GRA	(United States) MOH	(United States) ROA	(United States) LS1	(United States) ATL	(United States) HMS	(United States) LS2	Points
1	(United States) Jeff Simmons		10	1	1	3	2	26	5	2	1	2	2	158
2	(United States) Todd Snyder	1	2	6	10	4	7	4	3	1	2	3	1	155
3	(Norway) Thomas Schie	3	1	7	6	1	19	8	6	23	5	5	26	114
4	(Italy) Giovanni Anapoli	23	7	20	7	6	4	3	2	6	6	9	10	103
5	(United States) Will Langhorne	25	6	2	8	7	1	10	22	7	20	6	7	98
6	(Brazil) Nilton Rossoni	22	21		2	21	5		1			1	3	83
7	(France) Nicolas Rondet	18	15	25	9	2	3	2	4				16	67
8	(United States) Jon Fogarty	7	18	27	11	25	11	1	12	3	8	19	23	65
9	(Netherlands) Sepp Koster	26	4	4	5	22	20	25	9	22	4	10	27	61
10	(United States) Alex Gurney	20	19	11	13	9	6	5	21	12	17	4	14	55
11	(United States) Rocky Moran Jr.	30	20	5	3	27	22	12	27	4			6	51
12	(Canada) John McCaig	6	30	13	5	8		22	11	10	18	18	11	50
13	(Lebanon) Samer Hindi	5	14	29	15	12	10	21	8	11			5	40
14	(United States) Shane Donley	15	5	8	4	23	14	7	24					43
15	(United States) Eric Tresslar	19	9	24	16	10	23	9	7	21	14	8	13	42
16	(United States) Townsend Bell	28	13	28	22	16				5	3	23	8	36
17	(United States) Jamie Menninga	29	23	30	20	13	9	13	25	9	21	24	4	32
18	(United States) Tom Woods	8	12	9	18	11	24	11	17	24	22	20	24	29
19	(Italy) Rino Mastronardi		3	3	28									28
20	(United States) Brian Pelke	11	22	14	23	19	15	16	16	8	9	14	30	25
21	(Republic of Ireland) Owen McAuley	16	11	22	24	6			10					21
22	(United States) Charles Willis	21	29	18	21	8	12	15	19	14	15	11		21
23	(United States) Peter Boss	12	16	16	25	15	16	18	15	16	10	13	12	19
24	(Puerto Rico) Victor Gonzalez Jr.	2	26	26	27	26	21							17
25	(United States) Matt Plumb								26			7	9	16
26	(Mexico) Memo Rojas	9	24	23	17	29	13			20	11		17	15
27	(Norway) Martin Stenshorne	24	8	10	29									14
28	(United States) G.J. Mennen	4	25	15										13
29	(United States) Gregg Borland	10	27	17	26	14	13	17	14					13
30	(Switzerland) Iradj Alexander										7	21	19	9
31	(Italy) Giovanni Gulinelli	13	17	21	12									7
32	(Sweden) Jens Tjärnlund								20		12	15		5
33	(United States) Jarrett Boon	27	31	12	19	28	18			17				4
34	(United States) Joshua Rehm											12		4
35	(United States) Scott Mayer	17	28	19	24	20	17	20	18	19	13		18	3
36	(United States) Mikel Miller									13				3
37	(United States) Jeff Altenburg							14	23	15				3
38	(United States) Owen Trinkler	14												2
39	(United States) Tom Fogarty									18			15	1
40	(United States) Brent Sherman										16	16	20	
40	(Italy) Sal Lombardo										19	25	22	
40	(United States) Ryan Hunter-Reay							23				22		
40	(United States) Michael Morris											17	21	
40	(United States) Jon Vannini											26	28	
40	(Mexico) David Martínez					17								
40	(United States) Patsy DiFilippo					18		19						
40	(United States) Stephen Sardelli							24						
40	(United States) David Francis Jr.									25				
40	(United States) Randy Puro												25	
40	(United States) Todd Lamb												29	
40	(Australia) Cameron McConville												31	
