= Todd Snyder (racing driver) =

- Nationality: (United States) American
- Born: January 6, 1965 (age 61) Anchorage, Alaska, U.S.

Previous series
- 2010-2012 2001 2000 1998-1999 1988 1986–1987: Continental Tire Sports Car Challenge; Rolex Sports Car Series; Indy Lights; Barber Dodge Pro Series; Barber Saab Pro Series; Formula Russell

Todd Snyder (born January 6, 1965 in Anchorage, Alaska) is an American former racing driver and driving instructor. Snyder was placed second in the 1998 and 1999 Barber Dodge Pro Series seasons.

== Career ==
Snyder started his pro racing career at the Jim Russell Racing School. The driver from Alaska finished second in his second pro series season ever in the Formula Russell Pro Mazda. In 1988 Snyder made his debut in the Barber Saab Pro Series. At Sonoma Raceway, he finished third behind Rob Wilson and Harald Huysman. In 1990 Todd Snyder joined the Skip Barber Racing School as a lead instructor at Lime Rock Park. In 1998, Snyder returned to the rebranded Barber Dodge Pro Series. After winning the opening round at Sebring International Raceway Snyder won two races at Mazda Raceway Laguna Seca. He finished runner-up in the championship, three points behind Jeff Simmons. In 1999, he returned in the series. After a poor start of the season, the race instructor won four races. Again, Snyder finished second in the championship, this time four points behind Simmons. Following his strong results, Snyder tested an Indy Lights car for Conquest Racing and Brian Stewart Racing. He competed six races for Brian Stewart Racing in the 2000 Indy Lights season. Snyder also competed in the 2000 24 Hours of Daytona. In a Chevrolet Camaro entered by Diablo Racing the team finished third in the US GT class. He returned to the 24 Hours of Daytona in 2001 and 2002 but without achieving any significant results.

Snider focused on his professional career becoming the vice president of competition at the Skip Barber Racing School in 2004. He also fulfilled the position of director of competition in the SCCA Mazda MX-5 Cup. Since 2013, he fulfills the function of race director for the Ferrari Challenge North America. He also was chief instructor at the Mid-Ohio Sports Car Course from 2012 to 2015. Snyder returned to racing 2010, 2011 and 2012 Continental Tire Sports Car Challenge seasons.

In 2015, Snyder joined the Lucas Oil School of Racing as chief operating officer for the racing school and race series.

== Motorsports Career Results ==
=== American open–wheel racing results ===
(key) (Races in bold indicate pole position)

==== Barber Dodge Pro Series ====
Year	1	2	3	4	5	6	7	8	9	10	11	12	Rank	Points
1998	SEB; 1	LRP; 2	DET; 6	WGI; 10	CLE; 4	GRA; 7	MOH; 4	ROA; 3	**LS1**; 1	ATL; 2	HMS; 3	LS2; 1	**2nd**	**155**
1999	SEB; 28	NAZ; 23	LRP; 5	POR; 23	**CLE**; 4	ROA; 3	DET; 1	MOH; 1	GRA; 1	LS; 2	HMS; 1	WGI; 3	**2nd**	**148**

==== Indy Lights ====
Year	Team	1	2	3	4	5	6	7	8	9	10	11	12	Rank	Points
2000	Brian Stewart Racing	LBH; 15	MIL; 15	DET; 8	POR; 18	MIS; 5	CHI; 16	MOH	VAN	LS	STL	HOU	FON	**17th**	**15**

=== 24 Hours of Daytona ===
24 Hours of Daytona results
Year	Class	No	Team	Car	Co-drivers	Laps	Position	Class Pos.
2000	AGT	53	(United States) Diablo Racing	Chevrolet Camaro	(United States) Mayo Smith (United States) Eric Curran (United States) Tom Scheuren (United States) Rick Dilorio	303	49	3
2001	AGT	53	(United States) Diablo Racing	Chevrolet Camaro	(United States) Mayo Smith (United States) Eric Curran (United States) Tom Scheuren (United States) Rick Dilorio	125	64^{DNF}	6^{DNF}
2001	SRP	06	(United States) Jacobs Motorsports	Ford Riley DP	(United States) Michael Jacobs (United States) Peter Argetsinger (United States) Nick Longhi	112	66^{DNF}	11^{DNF}
2002	GT	10	(United States) Genesis Racing	BMW M3	(United States) Nick Longhi (United States) Emil Assentato (United States) Rick Fairbanks	547	28	17

=== 12 Hours of Sebring ===
12 Hours of Sebring results
Year	Class	No	Team	Car	Co-drivers	Laps	Position	Class Pos.
1999	GT	39	(United States) Broadfoot Racing	Porsche 911 Carrera RSR	(United States) Stephen Earle (United States) Allan Ziegelman (United States) Chris Mitchum	100	47^{DNF}	14^{DNF}
