= West Michigan Grand Prix =

Sports event

Coordinates: 42°57′40″N 85°39′20″W

- Location: Grand Rapids, Michigan
- First race: 1998
- Last race: 1999
- Distance: 101.12
- Laps: 64
- Most wins (driver): (United States) Bill Saunders (1) (United States) Brian Simo (1)
- Most wins (manufacturer): Chevrolet Corvette (1); Ford Mustang Cobra (1)

Circuit information
- Surface: Asphalt
- Length: 1.580 mi (2.543 km)
- Turns: 13
- Lap record: 1:15.062 ( (United States) Todd Snyder, Reynard 98E, 1999, Barber Dodge Pro Series)

The West Michigan Grand Prix was a weekend of professional auto racing held at the Scott Brayton Memorial Street Circuit in Grand Rapids, Michigan. The first edition was held in 1998 and the final edition in 1999. The Grand Prix was sanctioned by SCCA Pro Racing.

== History ==
The West Michigan Grand Prix was first announced in 1997 by SCCA Pro Racing. As part of the promotion of the event three Trans-Am Series cars raced down Fulton Street. A Ford Mustang Cobra, Oldsmobile Cutlass and Chevrolet Camaro passed Grand Rapids mayor John H. Logie waving the green flag.

Alan Wilson designed the 13-turn track named after late IndyCar Series driver Scott Brayton. Brayton suffered a deadly crash during Indy 500 practice in 1996. Before the inaugural Grand Prix weekend official pre parties were held at the Grand Rapids Art Museum and Van Andel Museum Center.

The Trans-Am Series was the headline event of both West Michigan Grand Prix editions. The first edition saw 31 Trans-Am cars take the green flag. Bill Saunders won the race with a margin of victory of over 44 seconds.

The fastest overall racelap was set by Todd Snyder in the 1999 Barber Dodge Pro Series. Snyder passed polesitter Sepp Koster for the lead on lap 17. Koster left a gap coming out of turn one and Snyder could pass him for the lead.

The largest field was that of the SCCA Spec Racer Ford Pro Series in 1999. 40 cars participated in the race.

Without backing from a major corporate sponsor the Grand Prix folded after 1999. Despite attracting more than 100,000 racefans both years, there were also complaints about the noise and the large number of streets that were closed.

The track is now home to the Grand Cycling Classic, an event part of the United States National Criterium Championships.

== Winners ==
=== Trans-Am ===
Year	Winner (car)	Fastest lap (car)	Pole position (car)
1998	(United States) Bill Saunders (Chevrolet Corvette)	(United States) Paul Gentilozzi (Chevrolet Corvette)	(United States) Paul Gentilozzi (Chevrolet Corvette)
1999	(United States) Brian Simo (Ford Mustang Cobra)	(United States) Chris Neville (Ford Mustang Cobra)	(United States) Brian Simo (Ford Mustang Cobra)

=== World Challenge T1/GT ===
Year	Winner (car)	Fastest lap (car)	Pole position (car)
1998	(United States) Peter Cunningham (Acura NSX)	(United States) Peter Cunningham (Acura NSX)	(United States) Terry Borcheller (Saleen Mustang)
1999	(United States) Peter Kitchak (Porsche 911 RSR)	(United States) Peter Kitchak (Porsche 911 RSR)	(United States) Peter Kitchak (Porsche 911 RSR)

=== World Challenge T2/TC ===
Year	Winner (car)	Fastest lap (car)	Pole position (car)
1998	(United States) Lance Stewart (Acura Integra R)	(United States) Michael Galati (Acura Integra R)	(United States) Michael Galati (Acura Integra R)
1999	(United States) Will Turner (BMW 328)	(United States) Michael Galati (Acura Integra R)	(Brazil) Pierre Kleinubing (Acura Integra R)

=== Barber Dodge Pro Series ===
Year	Winner (car)	Fastest lap (car)	Pole position (car)
1998	(United States) Will Langhorne (Reynard 98E)	(United States) Jeff Simmons (Reynard 98E)	(Puerto Rico) Victor Gonzalez, Jr (Reynard 98E)
1999	(United States) Todd Snyder (Reynard 98E)	(United States) Todd Snyder (Reynard 98E)	(Netherlands) Sepp Koster (Reynard 98E)

=== Spec Racer Ford Pro Series ===
Year	Winner (car)	Fastest lap (car)	Pole position (car)
1998	(United States) John Strickler (Spec Racer Ford)	(United States) Warren Stilwell (Spec Racer Ford)	(United States) Warren Stilwell (Spec Racer Ford)
1999	(United States) Neil Tilbor (Spec Racer Ford)	(United States) Keith Scharf (Spec Racer Ford)	(United States) Warren Stilwell (Spec Racer Ford)

=== Keller Ford Vintage Grand Prix Race ===
Year	Winner (car)	Fastest lap (car)	Pole position (car)
1998	(United States) Steve Prewitt (1967 Chevrolet Corvette Coupe)		
