= Lime Rock Grand Prix =

Motor race

Track map of Lime Rock Park

The Lime Rock Grand Prix (2010 name: Memorial Day Classic) is a sports car race held at Lime Rock Park in Lakeville, Connecticut, United States on the Memorial Day weekend. It had been a part of the Grand-Am Rolex Sports Car Series, SCCA National Sports Car Championship, USAC Road Racing Championship, Trans-Am Series, IMSA GT Championship and United States Road Racing Championship. The revived version in 2017 is for the United States Auto Club Pirelli World Challenge.

== Winners ==
Year	Date	Overall winner(s)	Entrant	Car	Distance/Duration	Race title	Report
SCCA National Sports Car Championship
1957	June 9	(United States) Carroll Shelby	(United States) John Edgar	Maserati 300S	60 miles (97 km)	Lime Rock National Championship Sports Car Races	report
1958	June 15	(United States) Walt Hansgen	(United States) Briggs Cunningham	Lister-Jaguar	60 miles (97 km)	Lime Rock National Sports Car Races	report
USAC Road Racing Championship
1959	June 6	(United States) George Constantine	(United States) Elisha Walker	Aston Martin DBR2	180 kilometres (110 mi)		report
1960 —1971	Not held						
IMSA GT Championship
1972	May 29	(United States) Jim Locke (United States) Bob Bailey	(United States) Locke Family Enterprises	Porsche 911S	200 miles (320 km)	Camel 200	report
1973	September 15	(United States) Michael Keyser	(United States) Toad Hall Motor Racing	Porsche Carrera RSR	100 miles (160 km)		report
1973	September 15	(United States) Peter Gregg	(United States) Peter Gregg	Porsche Carrera	100 miles (160 km)		report
1974	September 2	(United States) Peter Gregg	(United States) Brumos Porsche-Audi	Porsche Carrera RSR	100 miles (160 km)		report
1974	September 2	(United States) Michael Keyser	(United States) Toad Hall Motor Racing	Porsche Carrera RSR	100 miles (160 km)		report
1975	May 26	(United States) Peter Gregg	?	Porsche Carrera RSR	100 miles (160 km)	Schaefer 350	report
1975	May 26	(United States) Al Holbert	?	Porsche Carrera RSR	100 miles (160 km)	Schaefer 350	report
1976	May 31	(United States) George Dyer	(United States) George Dyer	Porsche Carrera RSR	100 miles (160 km)	Coca-Cola Lime Rock Camel GT Challenge	report
1977	May 30	(United States) Al Holbert	(United States) Holbert Racing	Chevrolet Monza	100 miles (160 km)	Coca-Cola 350	report
1978	May 29	(United States) Peter Gregg	(United States) Brumos Porsche	Porsche 935/77A	100 miles (160 km)	Coca-Cola 300	report
1979	May 28	(United States) Peter Gregg	(United States) Brumos Porsche	Porsche 935/79	100 miles (160 km)	Coca-Cola 350	report
1980	May 26	(United States) John Paul Sr. (United States) John Paul Jr.	(United States) Preston Henn	Porsche 935 K3	1 hour, 30 minutes	Coca-Cola 400	report
1981	May 24	(United Kingdom) Brian Redman	(United States) Preston Henn	Lola T600-Chevrolet	2 hours	Coca-Cola 400	report
1982	May 31	(United Kingdom) John Fitzpatrick	(United Kingdom) John Fitzpatrick Racing	Porsche 935 K4	1 hour	Coca-Cola 400	report
1983	May 30	(United States) Bob Tullius (Canada) Bill Adam	(United States) Group 44	Jaguar XJR-5	3 hours	Coca-Cola 500	report
1984	May 28	(South Africa) Sarel van der Merwe	(South Africa) Kreepy Krauly Racing	March 83G-Porsche	1 hour	Coca-Cola 500	report
1985	May 27	(United States) Drake Olson	(United States) Dyson Racing	Porsche 962	2 hours	Coca-Cola 500	report
1986	May 26	(United States) Al Holbert	(United States) Holbert Racing	Porsche 962	225 miles (362 km)	Camel Grand Prix	report
1987	May 24	(United States) Al Holbert	(United States) Holbert Racing	Porsche 962	225 miles (362 km)	Camel Grand Prix	report
1988	May 30	(Australia) Geoff Brabham	(United States) Electramotive Engineering	Nissan GTP ZX-T	225 miles (362 km)	Camel Grand Prix	report
1989	May 29	(Australia) Geoff Brabham	(United States) Electramotive Engineering	Nissan GTP ZX-T	225 miles (362 km)	Toyota Trucks Grand Prix	report
1990	May 28	(United States) Price Cobb (Denmark) John Nielsen	(United Kingdom) Castrol Jaguar Racing	Jaguar XJR-10	225 miles (362 km)	Toyota Trucks Grand Prix	report
1991	May 26	(United States) Chip Robinson	(United States) Nissan Performance Technology, Inc.	Nissan NPT-91	2 hours	Toyota Trucks presents the Lime Rock Grand Prix	report
1992	May 25	(Argentina) Juan Manuel Fangio II	(United States) All American Racers	Eagle Mk III-Toyota	2 hours	Toyota Trucks Lime Rock Grand Prix	report
1993	May 31	(Argentina) Juan Manuel Fangio II	(United States) All American Racers	Eagle Mk III-Toyota	2 hours	Toyota Trucks Lime Rock Grand Prix	report
1994	May 30	(Chile) Eliseo Salazar (Italy) Giampiero Moretti	(Italy) Momo	Ferrari 333 SP	2 hours	New England Dodge Dealers Grand Prix at Lime Rock	report
1995	May 29	(South Africa) Wayne Taylor	(Italy) Momo	Ferrari 333 SP	1 hour, 45 minutes	Dodge Dealers Grand Prix at Lime Rock	report
1996	May 27	(Italy) Giampiero Moretti (Italy) Max Papis	(Italy) Momo Corse	Ferrari 333 SP	1 hour, 45 minutes	ATCALL presents the Dodge Dealers Grand Prix	report
1997	May 26	(Brazil) Antônio Hermann (Italy) Andrea Montermini	(Italy) Moretti Racing	Ferrari 333 SP	1 hour, 45 minutes	Connecticut Lottery presents the Dodge Dealers Grand Prix	report
1998	May 25	(United States) Butch Leitzinger (United Kingdom) James Weaver	(United States) Dyson Racing	Riley & Scott Mk III-Ford	1 hour, 45 minutes	Dodge Dealers Grand Prix	report
United States Road Racing Championship
1999	May 30	(Switzerland) Fredy Lienhard (Belgium) Didier Theys	(United States) Doran Lista Racing	Ferrari 333 SP	2 hours, 15 minutes	Dodge Dealers Grand Prix	report
Grand American Road Racing Championship
2000	May 29	(United States) Butch Leitzinger (United Kingdom) James Weaver	(United States) Dyson Racing	Riley & Scott Mk III-Ford	150 miles (240 km)	Dodge Dealers Grand Prix	report
2001	May 28	(United States) Butch Leitzinger (United Kingdom) James Weaver	(United States) Dyson Racing	Riley & Scott Mk III-Ford	40 minutes	Dodge Dealers Grand Prix	report
2001	May 28	(United States) Butch Leitzinger (United Kingdom) James Weaver	(United States) Dyson Racing	Riley & Scott Mk III-Ford	45 minutes	Dodge Dealers Grand Prix	report
Trans-Am Series
2002	May 27	(United States) Boris Said	(United States) ACS Express Racing	Panoz Esperante	100 miles (160 km)	Mohegan Sun presents The Lime Rock Park Grand Prix	report
2003	May 26	(United States) Johnny Miller	(United States) Rocketsports Racing	Jaguar XKR	100 miles (160 km)	Mohegan Sun presents The Lime Rock Park Grand Prix	report
2004 —2005	Not held						
2006	May 29	(United States) Andy Lally (United States) R.J. Valentine (United States) Marc Bunting	(United States) The Racer's Group	Pontiac GTO.R	250 mi (400 km)	Rolex GT Series Challenge	report
2007	May 28	(United States) Leighton Reese (United States) Tim Lewis Jr.	(United States) Banner Racing	Pontiac GXP.R	2 Hours, 30 Minutes	Grand-Am GT Classic	report
2008	May 26	(United States) Paul Edwards (United States) Kelly Collins	(United States) Banner Racing	Pontiac GXP.R	250 mi (400 km)	Grand-Am GT Classic	report
2009	Not held						
2010	May 31	(Italy) Max Angelelli (United States) Ricky Taylor	(United States) SunTrust Racing	Dallara DP01-Ford	2 hours 30 minutes	Memorial Day Classic	report
2011	May 31	(Italy) Max Angelelli (United States) Ricky Taylor	(United States) SunTrust Racing	Dallara DP01-Chevrolet	2 hours 45 minutes	Memorial Day Classic	report
2012	Sept 29	(Italy) Max Angelelli (United States) Ricky Taylor	(United States) SunTrust Racing	Corvette DP	2 hours 45 minutes	Championship Weekend	report
2013	Sept 28	(Italy) Max Angelelli (United States) Jordan Taylor	(United States) Wayne Taylor Racing	Corvette DP	2 hours 45 minutes	Championship Weekend presented by BMW	report
