= Javier González =

Javier González may refer to:

- Javier Alberto González (born 1979), Colombian cyclist
- Javier González (basketball) (born 1989), basketball player
- Javier González (footballer, born 1939) (1939–2018), Peruvian footballer
- Javier González (footballer, born 1979), Paraguayan footballer
- Javier González (footballer, born 1988), Venezuelan footballer
- Javier González Garza (born 1945), Mexican mathematician and politician
- Javier González Gómez (born 1974), retired Spanish footballer
- Javier González Panton (born 1983), Cuban volleyball player
- Javier González (politician), politician in Puerto Rico
- Javier González (racing driver) (born 1962), Mexican racing driver
- Javier González Urruticoechea, aka Urruti, (1952–2001) Spanish footballer
- Javier González (weightlifter) (born 1949), Cuban weightlifter
