= Chris Baker (racing driver) =

American racing driver (born 1969)

Chris Baker (born November 29, 1969) is a race car driver. He raced in US Barber Formula Dodge in 2001, and in the Barber Dodge Pro Series from 2002 until 2003. He also raced in the National R/T 2000 Series. He won the Barber Dodge midwestern racing series of 2001.

Baker was born in Houston, Texas. He started racing karts from a young age. He is currently a racing instructor living in Austin, Texas.

== Complete motorsports results ==
=== American Open-Wheel racing results ===
(key) (Races in bold indicate pole position, races in italics indicate fastest race lap)

==== Barber Dodge Pro Series ====
Year	1	2	3	4	5	6	7	8	9	10	Rank	Points
2002	SEB; 11	LRP; 22	LAG; 18	POR; 19	TOR; 9	CLE; 16	VAN; 11	MOH; 14	ROA; 12	MTL; 19	**15th**	**30**
2003	STP; 18	MTY; 10	MIL; 4	LAG; 13	POR; 16	CLE	TOR	VAN; 13	MOH; 14	MTL; 16	**14th**	**26**
