= 2014 12 Hours of Sebring =

Sports car endurance race

Sebring International Raceway

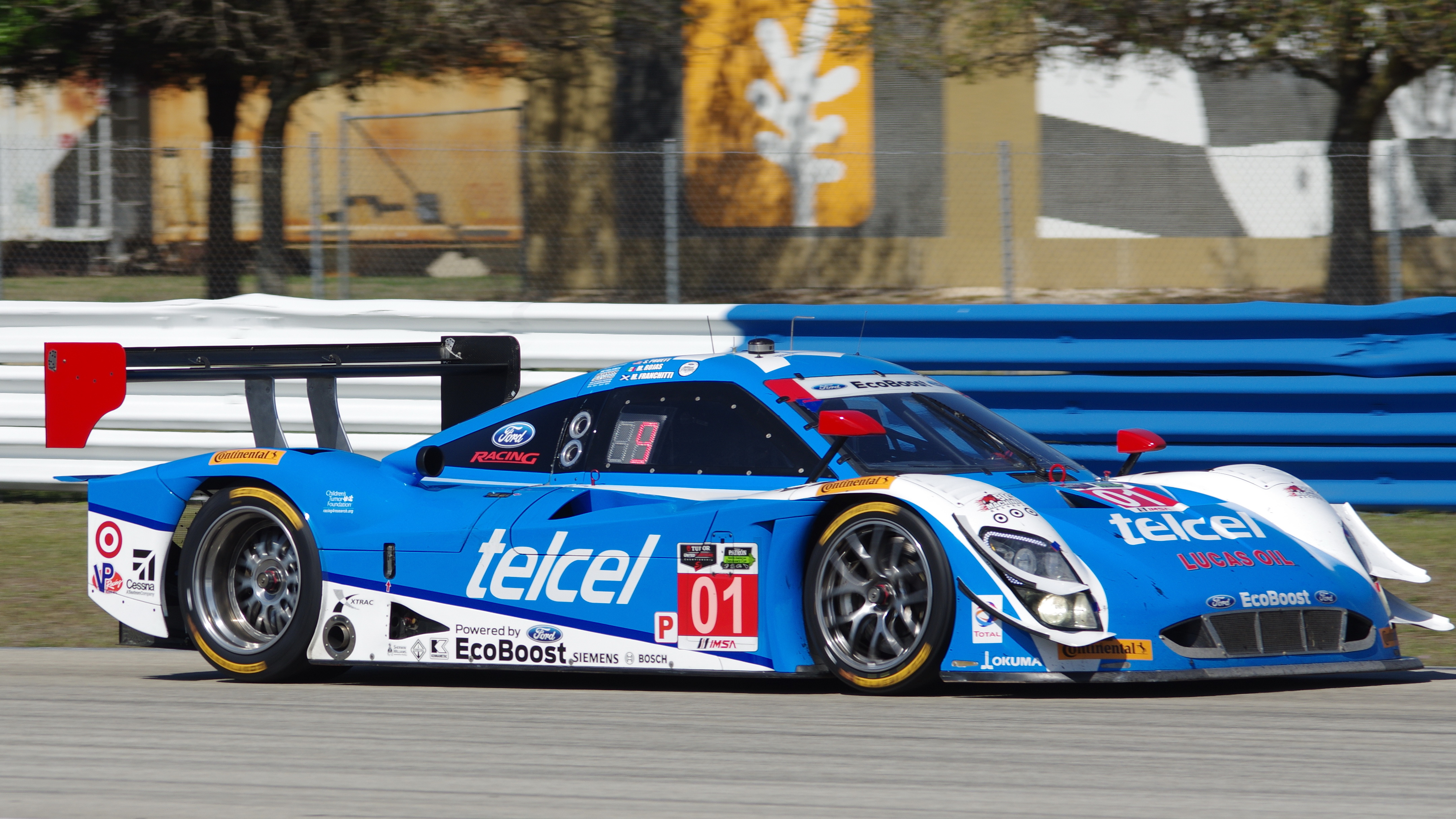
The winning No. 01 Chip Ganassi Racing Riley

The 62nd Mobil 1 12 Hours of Sebring fueled by Fresh from Florida, was an endurance sports car racing event held at Sebring International Raceway near Sebring Florida, from 13 to 15 March 2014. The race was the second round of the inaugural Tudor United SportsCar Championship, replacing the former American Le Mans Series that previously held the 12 Hours since 1999, as well as the second round of the North American Endurance Cup. Daytona Prototypes were introduced to the race for the first time as part of the development of the United SportsCar Championship.

The race was won by Chip Ganassi Racing's Riley-Ford driven by Scott Pruett, Memo Rojas, and Marino Franchitti, ahead of Extreme Speed Motorsports' HPD-Honda and Action Express Racing's Chevrolet Corvette. Ford's victory was the company's first since 1969. The PC class winners were CORE Autosport in their second straight victory of the season, with drivers Colin Braun, Jon Bennett, and James Gue. Porsche North America also earned their second win of the year in GTLM with Patrick Long, Michael Christensen, and Jörg Bergmeister. The GTD category was led by Magnus Racing's Andy Lally, John Potter, and Marco Seefried.

== Background ==
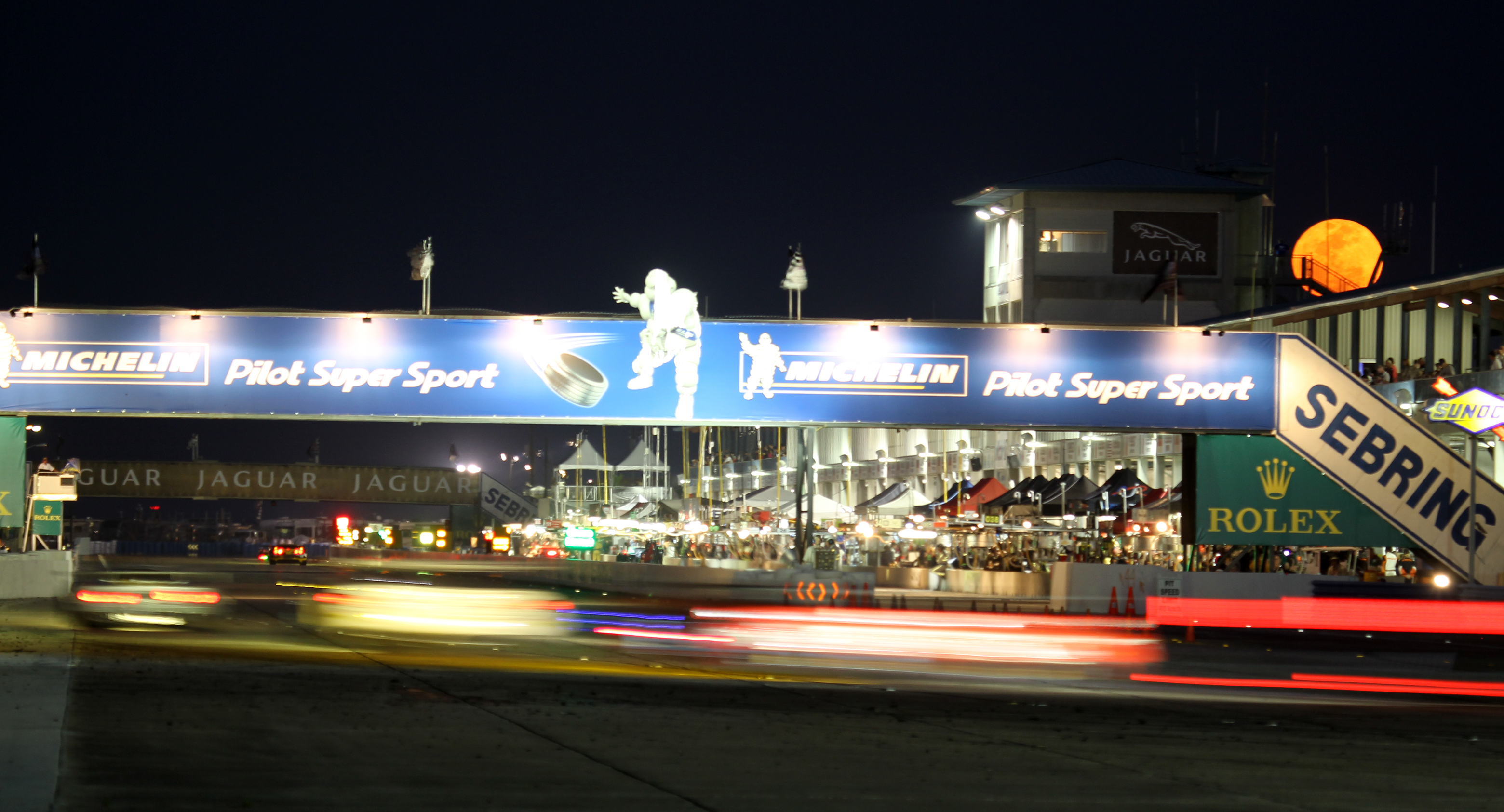
Sebring International Raceway, where the race was held.

=== Preview ===
International Motor Sports Association (IMSA) president Scott Atherton confirmed that the race was part of the 2014 United SportsCar Championship schedule in September 2013. It was the first year that the race was part of the series calendar, and the 62nd 12 Hours of Sebring. The race was the second of 2014's thirteen scheduled IMSA automobile endurance races, and the second of four North American Endurance Cup (NAEC) events. It was held at the 17-turn, 3.741-mile (6.021 km) Sebring International Raceway in Sebring, Florida on March 15, 2014.

== Qualifying ==
=== Qualifying results ===
Pole positions in each class are indicated in bold and with ‡.

Pos.	Class	No.	Team	Time	Gap	Grid
1	**P**	**5**	**(United States) Action Express Racing**	**1:51.917**	**_**	1‡
2	P	42	(France) OAK Racing	1:52.086	+0.169	2
3	P	10	(United States) Wayne Taylor Racing	1:52.544	+0.627	3
4	P	1	(United States) Extreme Speed Motorsports	1:52.662	+0.745	4
5	P	6	(United States) Muscle Milk Pickett Racing	1:52.667	+0.750	5
6	P	02	(United States) Chip Ganassi Racing with Felix Sabates	1:53.098	+1.181	6
7	P	90	(United States) Spirit of Daytona Racing	1:53.147	+1.230	7
8	P	2	(United States) Extreme Speed Motorsports	1:53.393	+1.476	8
9	P	01	(United States) Chip Ganassi Racing with Felix Sabates	1:53.456	+1.539	9
10	P	9	(United States) Action Express Racing	1:53.590	+1.673	10
11	P	60	(United States) Michael Shank Racing with Curb/Agajanian	1:54.062	+2.145	11
12	**PC**	**09**	**(United States) RSR Racing**	**1:54.839**	**+2.922**	12‡
13	P	78	(United States) Starworks Motorsport	1:55.081	+3.164	13
14	P	0	(United States) DeltaWing Racing Cars	1:55.468	+3.551	14
15	P	31	(United States) Marsh Racing	1:55.594	+3.677	15
16	PC	25	(United States) 8Star Motorsports	1:55.599	+3.682	16
17	PC	38	(United States) Performance Tech Motorsports	1:55.603	+3.686	17
18	PC	54	(United States) CORE Autosport	1:55.660	+3.743	18
19	PC	8	(United States) Starworks Motorsport	1:56.152	+4.235	19
20	PC	08	(United States) RSR Racing	1:56.253	+4.336	20
21	PC	88	(United States) BAR1 Motorsports	1:56.300	+4.383	21
22	PC	52	(United States) PR1/Mathiesen Motorsports	1:56.929	+5.012	22
23	PC	87	(United States) BAR1 Motorsports	1:57.495	+5.578	23
24	P	50	(United States) Highway to Help	1:58.366	+6.449	24
25	PC	85	(United States) JDC-Miller MotorSports	1:58.559	+6.642	25
26	**GTLM**	**912**	**(United States) Porsche North America**	**1:58.933**	**+7.016**	26‡
27	GTLM	55	(United States) BMW Team RLL	1:59.024	+7.107	27
28	GTLM	56	(United States) BMW Team RLL	1:59.094	+7.177	28
29	GTLM	4	(United States) Corvette Racing	1:59.222	+7.305	29
30	GTLM	3	(United States) Corvette Racing	1:59.224	+7.307	30
31	GTLM	911	(United States) Porsche North America	1:59.248	+7.331	31
32	GTLM	62	(United States) Risi Competizione	1:59.890	+7.973	32
33	GTLM	93	(United States) SRT Motorsports	2:00.111	+8.194	33
34	GTLM	17	(United States) Team Falken Tire	2:00.447	+8.530	34
35	GTLM	91	(United States) SRT Motorsports	2:00.509	+8.592	35
36	GTLM	57	(United States) Krohn Racing	2:00.538	+8.621	36
37	GTD	94	(United States) Turner Motorsport	2:04.258	+12.341	37‡
38	**GTD**	**22**	**(United States) Alex Job Racing**	**2:04.268**	**+12.351**	38
39	GTD	33	(United States) Riley Motorsports	2:04.311	+12.394	39
40	GTD	007	(United States) TRG-AMR	2:04.320	+12.403	40
41	GTD	63	(United States) Scuderia Corsa	2:04.460	+12.543	41
42	GTD	23	(United States) Team Seattle/Alex Job Racing	2:04.542	+12.625	42
43	GTD	13	(United States) Rum Bum/Snow Racing	2:04.561	+12.644	43
44	GTD	555	(Canada) AIM Autosport	2:04.650	+12.733	44
45	GTD	28	(United States) Dempsey Racing	2:04.784	+12.867	45
46	GTD	44	(United States) Magnus Racing	2:04.965	+13.048	46
47	GTD	30	(United States) NGT Motorsport	2:05.029	+13.112	47
48	GTD	73	(United States) Park Place Motorsports	2:05.038	+13.121	48
49	GTD	27	(United States) Dempsey Racing	2:05.087	+13.170	49
50	GTD	49	(Italy) Spirit of Race	2:05.146	+13.229	50
51	GTD	71	(United States) Park Place Motorsports	2:05.197	+13.280	51
52	GTD	32	(United States) GMG Racing	2:05.404	+13.487	52
53	GTD	19	(Belgium) Mühlner Motorsports America	2:05.606	+13.689	53
54	GTD	48	(United States) Paul Miller Racing	2:05.798	+13.881	54
55	GTD	009	(United States) TRG-AMR	2:05.863	+13.946	55
56	GTD	46	(United States) Fall-Line Motorsports	2:05.990	+14.073	56
57	GTD	45	(United States) Flying Lizard Motorsports	2:07.077	+15.160	57
58	GTD	35	(United States) Flying Lizard Motorsports	2:09.154	+17.237	58
59	GTD	51	(Italy) Spirit of Race	2:10.652	+18.735	59
60	P	07	(United States) Speedsource	2:14.095	+18.735	60
61	P	70	(United States) Speedsource	No Time Established		61
62	GTD	81	(United States) GB Autosport	No time		62
63	GTD	18	(Belgium) Mühlner Motorsports America	No Time Established		63

== Race ==
=== Race result ===
Final race classification
Pos	Class	No.	Team	Drivers	Chassis	Tire	Laps	Time/Retired
Pos	Class	No.	Team	Drivers	Engine	Tire	Laps	Time/Retired
1	P	01	(United States) Chip Ganassi Racing with Felix Sabates	(United States) Scott Pruett (Mexico) Memo Rojas (Scotland) Marino Franchitti	Riley MkXXVI	C	291	12:00:09.985
1	P	01	(United States) Chip Ganassi Racing with Felix Sabates	(United States) Scott Pruett (Mexico) Memo Rojas (Scotland) Marino Franchitti	Ford EcoBoost 3.5 L Turbo V6	C	291	12:00:09.985
2	P	1	(United States) Extreme Speed Motorsports	(United States) Scott Sharp (United Kingdom) Ryan Dalziel (Australia) David Brabham	HPD ARX-03b	C	291	+ 4.682
2	P	1	(United States) Extreme Speed Motorsports	(United States) Scott Sharp (United Kingdom) Ryan Dalziel (Australia) David Brabham	Honda HR28TT 2.8 L Turbo V6	C	291	+ 4.682
3	P	5	(United States) Action Express Racing	(Portugal) João Barbosa (Brazil) Christian Fittipaldi (France) Sébastien Bourdais	Coyote Corvette DP	C	291	+ 8.965
3	P	5	(United States) Action Express Racing	(Portugal) João Barbosa (Brazil) Christian Fittipaldi (France) Sébastien Bourdais	Chevrolet LS9 5.5 L V8	C	291	+ 8.965
4	P	42	(France) OAK Racing	(France) Olivier Pla (United Kingdom) Alex Brundle (Colombia) Gustavo Yacamán	Morgan LMP2	C	291	+ 11.994
4	P	42	(France) OAK Racing	(France) Olivier Pla (United Kingdom) Alex Brundle (Colombia) Gustavo Yacamán	Nissan VK45DE 4.5 L V8	C	291	+ 11.994
5	P	2	(United States) Extreme Speed Motorsports	(United States) Ed Brown (United States) Johannes van Overbeek (France) Simon Pagenaud	HPD ARX-03b	C	291	+ 17.027
5	P	2	(United States) Extreme Speed Motorsports	(United States) Ed Brown (United States) Johannes van Overbeek (France) Simon Pagenaud	Honda HR28TT 2.8 L Turbo V6	C	291	+ 17.027
6	P	02	(United States) Chip Ganassi Racing with Felix Sabates	(New Zealand) Scott Dixon (Brazil) Tony Kanaan (United States) Sage Karam	Riley MkXXVI	C	291	+ 17.837
6	P	02	(United States) Chip Ganassi Racing with Felix Sabates	(New Zealand) Scott Dixon (Brazil) Tony Kanaan (United States) Sage Karam	Ford EcoBoost 3.5 L Turbo V6	C	291	+ 17.837
7	P	10	(United States) Wayne Taylor Racing	(United States) Ricky Taylor (United States) Jordan Taylor (Italy) Max Angelelli	Dallara Corvette DP	C	291	+ 34.229
7	P	10	(United States) Wayne Taylor Racing	(United States) Ricky Taylor (United States) Jordan Taylor (Italy) Max Angelelli	Chevrolet LS9 5.5 L V8	C	291	+ 34.229
8	P	9	(United States) Action Express Racing	(United States) Brian Frisselle (United States) Burt Frisselle (United States) Jon Fogarty	Coyote Corvette DP	C	291	+ 39.559
8	P	9	(United States) Action Express Racing	(United States) Brian Frisselle (United States) Burt Frisselle (United States) Jon Fogarty	Chevrolet LS9 5.5 L V8	C	291	+ 39.559
9	P	60	(United States) Michael Shank Racing with Curb/Agajanian	(United States) John Pew (Brazil) Oswaldo Negri Jr. (United Kingdom) Justin Wilson	Riley MkXXVI	C	291	+ 40.568
9	P	60	(United States) Michael Shank Racing with Curb/Agajanian	(United States) John Pew (Brazil) Oswaldo Negri Jr. (United Kingdom) Justin Wilson	Ford EcoBoost 3.5 L Turbo V6	C	291	+ 40.568
10	PC	54	(United States) CORE Autosport	(United States) Colin Braun (United States) Jon Bennett (United States) James Gue	Oreca FLM09	C	288	+ 3 Laps
10	PC	54	(United States) CORE Autosport	(United States) Colin Braun (United States) Jon Bennett (United States) James Gue	Chevrolet 6.2 L V8	C	288	+ 3 Laps
11	PC	09	(United States) RSR Racing	(Brazil) Bruno Junqueira (United States) Duncan Ende (Denmark) David Heinemeier Hansson	Oreca FLM09	C	288	+ 3 Laps
11	PC	09	(United States) RSR Racing	(Brazil) Bruno Junqueira (United States) Duncan Ende (Denmark) David Heinemeier Hansson	Chevrolet 6.2 L V8	C	288	+ 3 Laps
12	GTLM	912	(United States) Porsche North America	(United States) Patrick Long (Denmark) Michael Christensen (Germany) Jörg Bergmeister	Porsche 911 RSR	MI	286	+ 5 Laps
12	GTLM	912	(United States) Porsche North America	(United States) Patrick Long (Denmark) Michael Christensen (Germany) Jörg Bergmeister	Porsche 4.0 L Flat-6	MI	286	+ 5 Laps
13	GTLM	93	(United States) SRT Motorsports	(United States) Jonathan Bomarito (Canada) Kuno Wittmer (United Kingdom) Rob Bell	SRT Viper GTS-R	MI	286	+ 5 Laps
13	GTLM	93	(United States) SRT Motorsports	(United States) Jonathan Bomarito (Canada) Kuno Wittmer (United Kingdom) Rob Bell	SRT 8.0 L V10	MI	286	+ 5 Laps
14	GTLM	55	(United States) BMW Team RLL	(United States) Bill Auberlen (United States) Joey Hand (United Kingdom) Andy Priaulx	BMW Z4 GTE	MI	286	+ 5 Laps
14	GTLM	55	(United States) BMW Team RLL	(United States) Bill Auberlen (United States) Joey Hand (United Kingdom) Andy Priaulx	BMW 4.4 L V8	MI	286	+ 5 Laps
15	GTLM	57	(United States) Krohn Racing	(United States) Tracy Krohn (Sweden) Niclas Jönsson (Italy) Andrea Bertolini	Ferrari 458 Italia GT2	MI	286	+ 5 Laps
15	GTLM	57	(United States) Krohn Racing	(United States) Tracy Krohn (Sweden) Niclas Jönsson (Italy) Andrea Bertolini	Ferrari 4.5 L V8	MI	286	+ 5 Laps
16	GTLM	17	(United States) Team Falken Tire	(United States) Bryan Sellers (Germany) Wolf Henzler (Germany) Marco Holzer	Porsche 911 RSR	FAL	285	+ 6 Laps
16	GTLM	17	(United States) Team Falken Tire	(United States) Bryan Sellers (Germany) Wolf Henzler (Germany) Marco Holzer	Porsche 4.0 L Flat-6	FAL	285	+ 6 Laps
17	GTLM	4	(United States) Corvette Racing	(United States) Tommy Milner (United Kingdom) Oliver Gavin (United Kingdom) Robin Liddell	Chevrolet Corvette C7.R	MI	285	+ 6 Laps
17	GTLM	4	(United States) Corvette Racing	(United States) Tommy Milner (United Kingdom) Oliver Gavin (United Kingdom) Robin Liddell	Chevrolet LT5.5 5.5 L V8	MI	285	+ 6 Laps
18	GTLM	91	(United States) SRT Motorsports	(Germany) Dominik Farnbacher (Belgium) Marc Goossens (United States) Ryan Hunter-Reay	SRT Viper GTS-R	MI	284	+ 7 Laps
18	GTLM	91	(United States) SRT Motorsports	(Germany) Dominik Farnbacher (Belgium) Marc Goossens (United States) Ryan Hunter-Reay	SRT 8.0 L V10	MI	284	+ 7 Laps
19	GTLM	3	(United States) Corvette Racing	(Denmark) Jan Magnussen (Spain) Antonio García (Australia) Ryan Briscoe	Chevrolet Corvette C7.R	MI	283	+ 8 Laps
19	GTLM	3	(United States) Corvette Racing	(Denmark) Jan Magnussen (Spain) Antonio García (Australia) Ryan Briscoe	Chevrolet LT5.5 5.5 L V8	MI	283	+ 8 Laps
20	GTLM	911	(United States) Porsche North America	(United Kingdom) Nick Tandy (Austria) Richard Lietz (France) Patrick Pilet	Porsche 911 RSR	MI	282	+ 9 Laps
20	GTLM	911	(United States) Porsche North America	(United Kingdom) Nick Tandy (Austria) Richard Lietz (France) Patrick Pilet	Porsche 4.0 L Flat-6	MI	282	+ 9 Laps
21	PC	8	(United States) Starworks Motorsport	(Netherlands) Renger van der Zande (Mexico) Martín Fuentes (United Kingdom) Sam Bird (United States) David Cheng	Oreca FLM09	C	281	+ 10 Laps
21	PC	8	(United States) Starworks Motorsport	(Netherlands) Renger van der Zande (Mexico) Martín Fuentes (United Kingdom) Sam Bird (United States) David Cheng	Chevrolet 6.2 L V8	C	281	+ 10 Laps
22	PC	85	(United States) JDC-Miller MotorSports	(United States) Gerry Kraut (United States) Chris Miller (South Africa) Stephen Simpson	Oreca FLM09	C	280	+ 11 Laps
22	PC	85	(United States) JDC-Miller MotorSports	(United States) Gerry Kraut (United States) Chris Miller (South Africa) Stephen Simpson	Chevrolet 6.2 L V8	C	280	+ 11 Laps
23	GTD	44	(United States) Magnus Racing	(United States) Andy Lally (United States) John Potter (Germany) Marco Seefried	Porsche 911 GT America	C	278	+ 13 Laps
23	GTD	44	(United States) Magnus Racing	(United States) Andy Lally (United States) John Potter (Germany) Marco Seefried	Porsche 4.0 L Flat-6	C	278	+ 13 Laps
24	GTD	555	(Canada) AIM Autosport	(United States) Bill Sweedler (United States) Townsend Bell (United States) Jeff Segal (Italy) Maurizio Mediani	Ferrari 458 Italia GT3	C	278	+ 13 Laps
24	GTD	555	(Canada) AIM Autosport	(United States) Bill Sweedler (United States) Townsend Bell (United States) Jeff Segal (Italy) Maurizio Mediani	Ferrari 4.5 L V8	C	278	+ 13 Laps
25	GTD	23	(United States) Team Seattle/Alex Job Racing	(United States) Ian James (Germany) Mario Farnbacher (Spain) Alex Riberas	Porsche 911 GT America	C	278	+ 13 laps
25	GTD	23	(United States) Team Seattle/Alex Job Racing	(United States) Ian James (Germany) Mario Farnbacher (Spain) Alex Riberas	Porsche 4.0 L Flat-6	C	278	+ 13 laps
26	GTD	22	(United States) Alex Job Racing	(United States) Cooper MacNeil (United States) Leh Keen (Switzerland) Philipp Frommenwiler	Porsche 911 GT America	C	278	+ 13 Laps
26	GTD	22	(United States) Alex Job Racing	(United States) Cooper MacNeil (United States) Leh Keen (Switzerland) Philipp Frommenwiler	Porsche 4.0 L Flat-6	C	278	+ 13 Laps
27	GTD	35	(United States) Flying Lizard Motorsports	(United States) Seth Neiman (South Africa) Dion von Moltke (Portugal) Filipe Albuquerque	Audi R8 LMS	C	278	+ 13 Laps
27	GTD	35	(United States) Flying Lizard Motorsports	(United States) Seth Neiman (South Africa) Dion von Moltke (Portugal) Filipe Albuquerque	Audi 5.2 L V10	C	278	+ 13 Laps
28	GTD	46	(United States) Fall-Line Motorsports	(United States) Charles Espenlaub (United States) Charlie Putnam (Germany) Christopher Mies	Audi R8 LMS	C	278	+ 13 Laps
28	GTD	46	(United States) Fall-Line Motorsports	(United States) Charles Espenlaub (United States) Charlie Putnam (Germany) Christopher Mies	Audi 5.2 L V10	C	278	+ 13 Laps
29	P	90	(United States) Spirit of Daytona Racing	(Canada) Michael Valiante (United Kingdom) Richard Westbrook (Germany) Mike Rockenfeller	Coyote Corvette DP	C	278	+ 13 Laps
29	P	90	(United States) Spirit of Daytona Racing	(Canada) Michael Valiante (United Kingdom) Richard Westbrook (Germany) Mike Rockenfeller	Chevrolet LS9 5.5 L V8	C	278	+ 13 Laps
30	P	70	(United States) SpeedSource	(Canada) Sylvain Tremblay (United States) Tom Long (United Kingdom) Ben Devlin	Mazda Prototype	C	278	+ 13 Laps
30	P	70	(United States) SpeedSource	(Canada) Sylvain Tremblay (United States) Tom Long (United Kingdom) Ben Devlin	Mazda Skyactiv-D 2.2 L Turbo I4 (Diesel)	C	278	+ 13 Laps
31	GTLM	56	(United States) BMW Team RLL	(United States) John Edwards (Germany) Dirk Müller (Germany) Dirk Werner	BMW Z4 GTE	MI	277	+ 14 Laps
31	GTLM	56	(United States) BMW Team RLL	(United States) John Edwards (Germany) Dirk Müller (Germany) Dirk Werner	BMW 4.4 L V8	MI	277	+ 14 Laps
32	GTD	94	(United States) Turner Motorsport	(Canada) Paul Dalla Lana (United States) Dane Cameron (United States) Shane Lewis (Finland) Markus Palttala	BMW Z4 GT3	C	277	+ 14 Laps
32	GTD	94	(United States) Turner Motorsport	(Canada) Paul Dalla Lana (United States) Dane Cameron (United States) Shane Lewis (Finland) Markus Palttala	BMW 4.4 L V8	C	277	+ 14 Laps
33	GTD	45	(United States) Flying Lizard Motorsports	(United States) Spencer Pumpelly (United Kingdom) Alessandro Latif (Venezuela) Nelson Canache Jr. (Germany) Markus Winkelhock	Audi R8 LMS	C	276	+ 15 Laps
33	GTD	45	(United States) Flying Lizard Motorsports	(United States) Spencer Pumpelly (United Kingdom) Alessandro Latif (Venezuela) Nelson Canache Jr. (Germany) Markus Winkelhock	Audi 5.2 L V10	C	276	+ 15 Laps
34	GTD	13	(United States) Rum Bum/Snow Racing	(Belgium) Jan Heylen (United States) Madison Snow (United States) Matt Plumb (United States) Hugh Plumb	Porsche 911 GT America	C	273	+ 18 Laps
34	GTD	13	(United States) Rum Bum/Snow Racing	(Belgium) Jan Heylen (United States) Madison Snow (United States) Matt Plumb (United States) Hugh Plumb	Porsche 4.0 L Flat-6	C	273	+ 18 Laps
35	GTD	81	(United States) GB Autosport	(United States) Bob Faieta (United States) Michael Avenatti (Republic of Ireland) Damien Faulkner	Porsche 911 GT America	C	272	+ 19 Laps
35	GTD	81	(United States) GB Autosport	(United States) Bob Faieta (United States) Michael Avenatti (Republic of Ireland) Damien Faulkner	Porsche 4.0 L Flat-6	C	272	+ 19 Laps
36	GTD	32	(United States) GMG Racing	(United States) Alex Welch (United States) James Sofronas (Germany) Marc Basseng	Audi R8 LMS	C	271	+ 20 Laps
36	GTD	32	(United States) GMG Racing	(United States) Alex Welch (United States) James Sofronas (Germany) Marc Basseng	Audi 5.2 L V10	C	271	+ 20 Laps
37	PC	25	(United States) 8Star Motorsports	(United Kingdom) Tom Kimber-Smith (United States) Mike Marsal (United States) Eric Lux (United States) Sean Rayhall	Oreca FLM09	C	271	+ 20 Laps
37	PC	25	(United States) 8Star Motorsports	(United Kingdom) Tom Kimber-Smith (United States) Mike Marsal (United States) Eric Lux (United States) Sean Rayhall	Chevrolet 6.2 L V8	C	271	+ 20 Laps
38	GTD	48	(United States) Paul Miller Racing	(United States) Bryce Miller (United Kingdom) Matthew Bell (Germany) Christopher Haase	Audi R8 LMS	C	270	+ 21 Laps
38	GTD	48	(United States) Paul Miller Racing	(United States) Bryce Miller (United Kingdom) Matthew Bell (Germany) Christopher Haase	Audi 5.2 L V10	C	270	+ 21 Laps
39	GTD	51	(Italy) Spirit of Race	(Republic of Ireland) Matt Griffin (Italy) Marco Cioci (Italy) Michele Rugolo (South Africa) Jack Gerber	Ferrari 458 Italia GT3	C	270	+ 21 Laps
39	GTD	51	(Italy) Spirit of Race	(Republic of Ireland) Matt Griffin (Italy) Marco Cioci (Italy) Michele Rugolo (South Africa) Jack Gerber	Ferrari 4.5 L V8	C	270	+ 21 Laps
40	GTD	49	(Italy) Spirit of Race	(Italy) Gianluca Roda (Italy) Paolo Ruberti (Italy) Mirko Venturi	Ferrari 458 Italia GT3	C	263	+ 28 Laps
40	GTD	49	(Italy) Spirit of Race	(Italy) Gianluca Roda (Italy) Paolo Ruberti (Italy) Mirko Venturi	Ferrari 4.5 L V8	C	263	+ 28 Laps
41 DNF	P	31	(United States) Marsh Racing	(United States) Eric Curran (United States) Boris Said (United States) Guy Cosmo	Coyote Corvette DP	C	249	mechanical
41 DNF	P	31	(United States) Marsh Racing	(United States) Eric Curran (United States) Boris Said (United States) Guy Cosmo	Chevrolet LS9 5.5 L V8	C	249	mechanical
42	GTD	27	(United States) Dempsey Racing	(United States) Patrick Dempsey (United States) Joe Foster (United States) Andrew Davis (Austria) Norbert Siedler	Porsche 911 GT America	C	244	+ 47 Laps
42	GTD	27	(United States) Dempsey Racing	(United States) Patrick Dempsey (United States) Joe Foster (United States) Andrew Davis (Austria) Norbert Siedler	Porsche 4.0 L Flat-6	C	244	+ 47 Laps
43	GTD	009	(United States) TRG-AMR	(United States) Brandon Davis (United States) Kris Wilson (Canada) Max Riddle	Aston Martin V12 Vantage GT3	C	242	+ 49 Laps
43	GTD	009	(United States) TRG-AMR	(United States) Brandon Davis (United States) Kris Wilson (Canada) Max Riddle	Aston Martin 6.0 L V12	C	242	+ 49 Laps
44	GTD	73	(United States) Park Place Motorsports	(France) Kévin Estre (United States) Patrick Lindsey (United States) Jim Norman (United States) Mike Vess	Porsche 911 GT America	C	235	+ 56 Laps
44	GTD	73	(United States) Park Place Motorsports	(France) Kévin Estre (United States) Patrick Lindsey (United States) Jim Norman (United States) Mike Vess	Porsche 4.0 L Flat-6	C	235	+ 56 Laps
45 DNF	GTD	63	(United States) Scuderia Corsa	(United States) Jeff Westphal (Italy) Alessandro Balzan (Italy) Lorenzo Casé (Canada) Kyle Marcelli	Ferrari 458 Italia GT3	C	234	electrical
45 DNF	GTD	63	(United States) Scuderia Corsa	(United States) Jeff Westphal (Italy) Alessandro Balzan (Italy) Lorenzo Casé (Canada) Kyle Marcelli	Ferrari 4.5 L V8	C	234	electrical
46	PC	88	(United States) BAR1 Motorsports	(United States) Doug Biefield (United States) Tomy Drissi (United States) Chapman Ducote (United Kingdom) Martin Plowman	Oreca FLM09	C	228	+ 63 Laps
46	PC	88	(United States) BAR1 Motorsports	(United States) Doug Biefield (United States) Tomy Drissi (United States) Chapman Ducote (United Kingdom) Martin Plowman	Chevrolet 6.2 L V8	C	228	+ 63 Laps
47	GTD	007	(United States) TRG-AMR	(Australia) James Davison (United States) Al Carter (United States) David Block	Aston Martin V12 Vantage GT3	C	215	+ 76 Laps
47	GTD	007	(United States) TRG-AMR	(Australia) James Davison (United States) Al Carter (United States) David Block	Aston Martin 6.0 L V12	C	215	+ 76 Laps
48 DNF	P	6	(United States) Muscle Milk Pickett Racing	(Germany) Klaus Graf (Germany) Lucas Luhr (United Kingdom) Jann Mardenborough	Oreca 03	C	204	power steering
48 DNF	P	6	(United States) Muscle Milk Pickett Racing	(Germany) Klaus Graf (Germany) Lucas Luhr (United Kingdom) Jann Mardenborough	Nissan VK45DE 4.5 L V8	C	204	power steering
49 DNF	P	50	(United States) Highway to Help	(United States) Bryon DeFoor (United States) Jim Pace (United States) David Hinton	Riley MkXXVI	C	200	did not finish
49 DNF	P	50	(United States) Highway to Help	(United States) Bryon DeFoor (United States) Jim Pace (United States) David Hinton	Dinan-BMW 5.0 L V8	C	200	did not finish
50 DNF	P	0	(United States) DeltaWing Racing Cars	(United Kingdom) Andy Meyrick (United Kingdom) Katherine Legge (Colombia) Gabby Chaves	DeltaWing DWC13	C	185	crash
50 DNF	P	0	(United States) DeltaWing Racing Cars	(United Kingdom) Andy Meyrick (United Kingdom) Katherine Legge (Colombia) Gabby Chaves	Élan 1.9 L Turbo I4	C	185	crash
51	GTD	19	(United States) Mühlner Motorsports America	(New Zealand) Earl Bamber (United States) Kyle Gimple (Italy) Ruggero Melgrati	Porsche 911 GT America	C	154	+ 137 Laps
51	GTD	19	(United States) Mühlner Motorsports America	(New Zealand) Earl Bamber (United States) Kyle Gimple (Italy) Ruggero Melgrati	Porsche 4.0 L Flat-6	C	154	+ 137 Laps
52 DNF	PC	08	(United States) RSR Racing	(Canada) Chris Cumming (Canada) Alex Tagliani (United States) Rusty Mitchell	Oreca FLM09	C	125	crash
52 DNF	PC	08	(United States) RSR Racing	(Canada) Chris Cumming (Canada) Alex Tagliani (United States) Rusty Mitchell	Chevrolet 6.2 L V8	C	125	crash
53 DNF	GTD	28	(United States) Dempsey Racing	(Austria) Franz Konrad (Germany) Christian Engelhart (Switzerland) Rolf Ineichen	Porsche 911 GT America	C	113	suspension
53 DNF	GTD	28	(United States) Dempsey Racing	(Austria) Franz Konrad (Germany) Christian Engelhart (Switzerland) Rolf Ineichen	Porsche 4.0 L Flat-6	C	113	suspension
54 DNF	PC	87	(United States) BAR1 Motorsports	(United States) Gaston Kearby (United States) Bruce Hamilton (United States) Tõnis Kasemets	Oreca FLM09	C	112	crash
54 DNF	PC	87	(United States) BAR1 Motorsports	(United States) Gaston Kearby (United States) Bruce Hamilton (United States) Tõnis Kasemets	Chevrolet 6.2 L V8	C	112	crash
55 DNF	P	07	(United States) SpeedSource	(United States) Tristan Nunez (United States) Joel Miller (France) Tristan Vautier	Mazda Prototype	C	104	wheel
55 DNF	P	07	(United States) SpeedSource	(United States) Tristan Nunez (United States) Joel Miller (France) Tristan Vautier	Mazda Skyactiv-D 2.2 L Turbo I4 (Diesel)	C	104	wheel
56 DNF	PC	52	(United States) PR1/Mathiasen Motorsports	(United States) Mike Gausch (United States) Frankie Montecalvo (United States) Gunnar Jeannette	Oreca FLM09	C	89	crash
56 DNF	PC	52	(United States) PR1/Mathiasen Motorsports	(United States) Mike Gausch (United States) Frankie Montecalvo (United States) Gunnar Jeannette	Chevrolet 6.2 L V8	C	89	crash
57 DNF	PC	38	(United States) Performance Tech Motorsports	(United States) Charlie Shears (Canada) David Ostella (Brazil) Raphael Matos	Oreca FLM09	C	88	crash
57 DNF	PC	38	(United States) Performance Tech Motorsports	(United States) Charlie Shears (Canada) David Ostella (Brazil) Raphael Matos	Chevrolet 6.2 L V8	C	88	crash
58 DNF	GTLM	62	(United States) Risi Competizione	(Italy) Giancarlo Fisichella (Italy) Matteo Malucelli (Italy) Gianmaria Bruni	Ferrari 458 Italia GT2	MI	62	crash
58 DNF	GTLM	62	(United States) Risi Competizione	(Italy) Giancarlo Fisichella (Italy) Matteo Malucelli (Italy) Gianmaria Bruni	Ferrari 4.5 L V8	MI	62	crash
59 DNF	GTD	30	(United States) NGT Motorsport	(Venezuela) Henrique Cisneros (Poland) Kuba Giermaziak (Denmark) Christina Nielsen	Porsche 911 GT America	C	61	crash
59 DNF	GTD	30	(United States) NGT Motorsport	(Venezuela) Henrique Cisneros (Poland) Kuba Giermaziak (Denmark) Christina Nielsen	Porsche 4.0 L Flat-6	C	61	crash
60 DNF	GTD	71	(United States) Park Place Motorsports	(France) Kévin Estre (United States) Patrick Lindsey (United States) Jim Norman (United States) Mike Vess	Porsche 911 GT America	C	34	parked
60 DNF	GTD	71	(United States) Park Place Motorsports	(France) Kévin Estre (United States) Patrick Lindsey (United States) Jim Norman (United States) Mike Vess	Porsche 4.0 L Flat-6	C	34	parked
61 DNF	P	78	(United States) Starworks Motorsport	(United States) Scott Mayer (Venezuela) Alex Popow (Colombia) Sebastián Saavedra (Germany) Pierre Kaffer	Riley MkXXVI	C	26	engine
61 DNF	P	78	(United States) Starworks Motorsport	(United States) Scott Mayer (Venezuela) Alex Popow (Colombia) Sebastián Saavedra (Germany) Pierre Kaffer	Honda HR35TT 3.5 L Turbo V6	C	26	engine
62 DNF	GTD	33	(United States) Riley Motorsports	(Netherlands) Jeroen Bleekemolen (Netherlands) Sebastiaan Bleekemolen (United States) Ben Keating	SRT Viper GT3-R	C	13	fire
62 DNF	GTD	33	(United States) Riley Motorsports	(Netherlands) Jeroen Bleekemolen (Netherlands) Sebastiaan Bleekemolen (United States) Ben Keating	SRT 8.0 L V10	C	13	fire
DNS	GTD	18	(United States) Mühlner Motorsports America	(New Zealand) Earl Bamber (Belgium) Nico Verdonck	Porsche 911 GT America	C	–	did not start
DNS	GTD	18	(United States) Mühlner Motorsports America	(New Zealand) Earl Bamber (Belgium) Nico Verdonck	Porsche 4.0 L Flat-6	C	–	did not start

Tyre manufacturers
Key
Symbol	Tyre manufacturer
C	Continental
MI	Michelin
FAL	Falken Tire

== Gallery ==
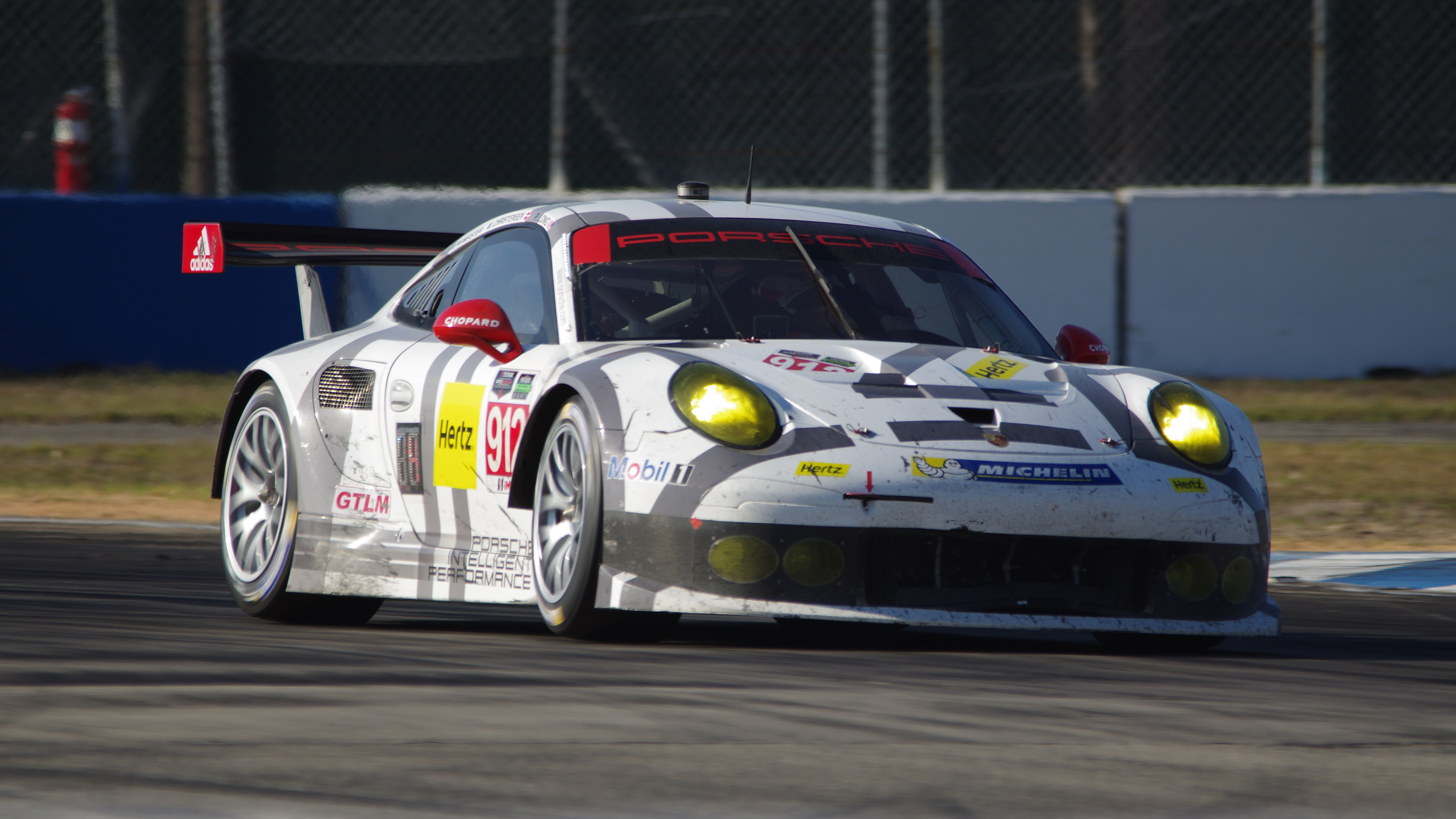
The GTLM winning No. 912 Porsche North America Porsche 911 RSR

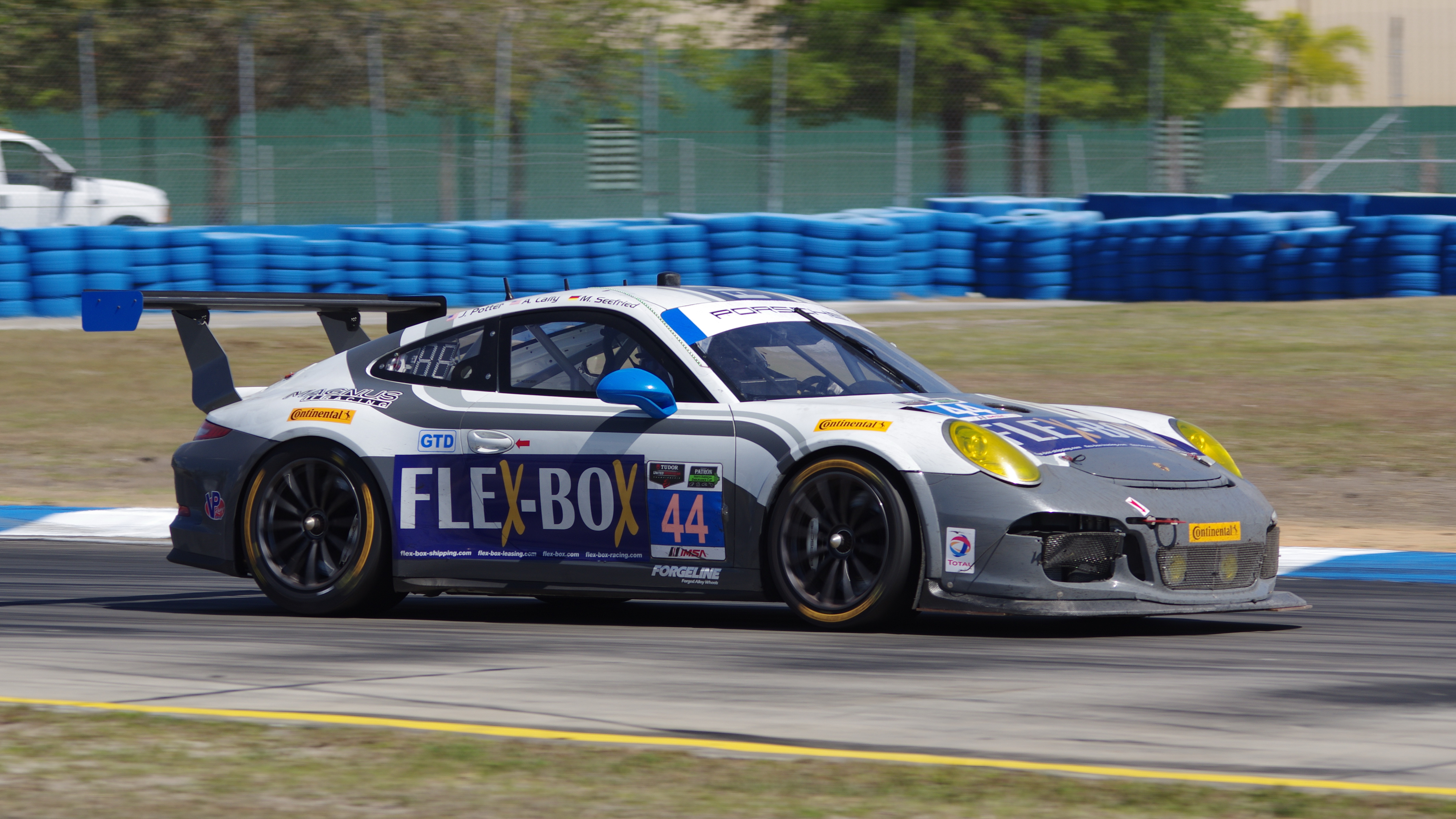
The GTD winning No. 44 Magnus Racing Porsche 911 GT America

United SportsCar Championship
Previous race: 24 Hours of Daytona	2014 season	Next race: Tequila Patrón Sports Car Showcase
