= 2003 Barber Dodge Pro Series =

Motor racing series

2003 Barber Dodge Pro Series season

Seasons
- ← 2002 none →

The 2003 Barber Dodge Pro Series season was the eighteenth and final season of the series. All races were run in support of the 2003 CART World Series. The season consisted of ten races of which four were run abroad, one in Mexico and three in Canada. Leonardo Maia won the championship and Colin Fleming won the Rookie of the Year title. This was the first, and only, time the series raced in Mexico.

== Drivers ==
All driver use Dodge powered Michelin shod Reynard 98E chassis.

No.	Driver	Note
6	(Brazil) Leonardo Maia	
11	(United States) Chris Baker	
12	(Japan) Shinji "Racer" Kashima	
14	(United States) David Wieringa	
15	(Mexico) Memo Rojas	
16	(Canada) Antoine Bessette	
17	(United States) Ben Freudenberg	
18	(United States) Robbie Montinola	
19	(Canada) Dan Di Leo	
20	(United States) Matt Franc	
21	(United States) Roland Isra	
22	(United States) Bret MacDonald	
23	(Brazil) Alexandre Sperafico	St. Petersburg only
23	(United States) Ward Imrie	As of Toronto
24	(United States) Burt Frisselle	
25	(United States) Atticus Missner	
26	(France) Nelson Philippe	
27	(Canada) Josh Beaulieu	
28	(United States) Colin Fleming	
30	(United States) Ron Atapattu	
31	(United States) Al Unser III	
33	(Mexico) German Quiroga	
34	(United States) Mike Richardson	
38	(Peru) Juan Manuel Polar	
39	(United States) Ryan Millen	
40	(United States) Bud Risser	
45	(United States) Guy Cosmo	
47	(Mexico) David Martínez	
49	(Mexico) Luis Pelayo	
50	(United Kingdom) Brian Johnson	
57	(United States) Steve Welk	
59	(Canada) Hima Maher	
63	(United States) Craig Duerson	
67	(United States) Steve Poirier	
71	(United States) Tom Hessert	
83	(Mexico) Salvador Duran	
88	(United States) Greg Long	
94	(Canada) Didier Schraenen	
95	(Puerto Rico) Victor Gonzalez, Jr.	
98	(Canada) Chris Green	

== Race calendar and results ==
Round	Circuit	Location	Date	Pole position	Fastest lap	Winning driver	Headline event
1	St. Petersburg Street Circuit	(United States) St. Petersburg, Florida	February 23	(Brazil) Leonardo Maia	(Canada) Dan Di Leo	(Brazil) Leonardo Maia	Grand Prix of St. Petersburg
2	Fundidora Park	(Mexico) Monterrey	March 23	(Brazil) Leonardo Maia	(Mexico) David Martínez	(Mexico) David Martínez	Monterrey Grand Prix
3	Milwaukee Mile	(United States) West Allis, Wisconsin	June 1	(Mexico) Victor Gonzalez, Jr.	(Canada) Chris Green	(Brazil) Leonardo Maia	Milwaukee Mile Centennial 250
4	Mazda Raceway Laguna Seca	(United States) Monterey, California	June 15	(Mexico) Memo Rojas	(Brazil) Leonardo Maia	(Canada) Dan Di Leo	Grand Prix of Monterey
5	Portland International Raceway	(United States) Portland, Oregon	June 22	(Brazil) Leonardo Maia	(Brazil) Leonardo Maia	(Brazil) Leonardo Maia	G.I. Joe's 200
6	Cleveland Burke Lakefront Airport	(United States) Cleveland, Ohio	July 5	(Brazil) Leonardo Maia	(Brazil) Leonardo Maia	(Brazil) Leonardo Maia	U.S. Bank Cleveland Grand Prix
7	Exhibition Place	(Canada) Toronto	July 13	(Brazil) Leonardo Maia	(Brazil) Leonardo Maia	(Mexico) Memo Rojas	Molson Indy Toronto
8	Concord Pacific Place	(Canada) Vancouver	July 27	(Brazil) Leonardo Maia	(Mexico) David Martínez	(Brazil) Leonardo Maia	Molson Indy Vancouver
9	Mid-Ohio Sports Car Course	(United States) Lexington, Ohio	August 9	(Brazil) Leonardo Maia	(Brazil) Leonardo Maia	(Brazil) Leonardo Maia	Champ Car Grand Prix of Mid-Ohio
10	Circuit Gilles Villeneuve	(Canada) Montreal	August 24	(Mexico) Memo Rojas	(Brazil) Leonardo Maia	(Mexico) Memo Rojas	Molson Indy Montreal

== Final standings ==
Color	Result
Gold	Winner
Silver	2nd place
Bronze	3rd place
Green	4th & 5th place
Light Blue	6th–10th place
Dark Blue	11th place or lower
Purple	Did not finish
Red	Did not qualify (DNQ)
Brown	Withdrawn (Wth)
Black	Disqualified (DSQ)
White	Did not start (DNS)
Blank	Did not participate (DNP)
Blank	Driver replacement (Rpl)
Blank	Injured (Inj)
Blank	No race held (NH)

Rank	Driver	(United States) STP	(Mexico) MTY	(United States) MIL	(United States) LAG	(United States) POR	(United States) CLE	(Canada) TOR	(Canada) VAN	(United States) MOH	(Canada) MTL	Points
1	(Brazil) Leonardo Maia	1	2	1	4	1	1	9	1	1	2	188
2	(Mexico) Memo Rojas	3	3	3	2	14	7	1	9	6	1	128
3	(Canada) Dan Di Leo	2	6	7	1	4	2	13	4	2	14	118
4	(Mexico) David Martínez		1	9	3	2	4	3	8	9	17	103
5	(United States) Colin Fleming (R)	25	4	10	7	3	10	2	15	11	3	83
6	(United States) Burt Frisselle (R)	6	15	5	19	6	6	5	5	7	13	76
7	(Mexico) German Quiroga	8	8	8	9	5	3	12	6	15	12	75
8	(United States) Scott Poirier (R)	4	7	12	8	15	8	15	2	13	8	70
9	(France) Nelson Philippe	10	5	15	18	7	15	16	3	4	4	66
10	(Mexico) Luis Pelayo (R)	22	9	16	5	9	5	10	12	16		46
11	(Canada) Chris Green (R)	5	12	11	10	13	14	11			7	46
12	(Canada) Antoine Bessette (R)	16	13	6			16	4	16	3	19	39
13	(United States) Al Unser III (R)	11	18	14	6	8	17	14	10	12	15	38
14	(United States) Chris Baker	18	10	4	13	16			13	14	16	26
15	(United States) Ben Freudenberg (R)					11				5	6	26
16	(United States) Ward Imrie (R)							6	7		11	24
17	(United States) Ryan Millen				12	12	11			8	18	21
18	(United States) Robbie Montinola (R)	21	21		11	10	12		11			20
19	(Canada) Mike Richardson	13	19	19				8	14		10	19
20	(Puerto Rico) Victor Gonzalez, Jr.	17	20	2	17							17
21	(Mexico) Salvador Duran (R)								17	10	5	17
22	(United States) Greg Long (R)						13	7				12
23	(United States) David Wieringa			13			9					10
24	(Brazil) Alexandre Sperafico	7										9
25	(United States) Guy Cosmo	9										7
26	(Canada) Didier Schraenen										9	7
27	(Canada) Josh Beaulieu	27	11									6
28	(United States) Atticus Missner	12										4
29	(United States) Craig Duerson (R)	14										2
30	(Peru) Juan Manuel Polar		14									2
31	(United Kingdom) Brian Johnson (R)				14							2
32	(Japan) Shinji Kashima (R)	15	17	18	16							1
33	(United States) Bret Macdonald (R)				15							1
34	(Canada) Hima Maher	20	16									0
35	(United States) Tom Hessert			17								0
36	(United States) Ron Atapattu (R)	19										0
37	(United States) Steve Welk (R)			20								0
38	(United States) Matt Franc (R)	23										0
39	(United States) Bud Risser (R)	24										0
40	(United States) Roland Isra (R)	26										0
