= Guy Cosmo =

American racing driver

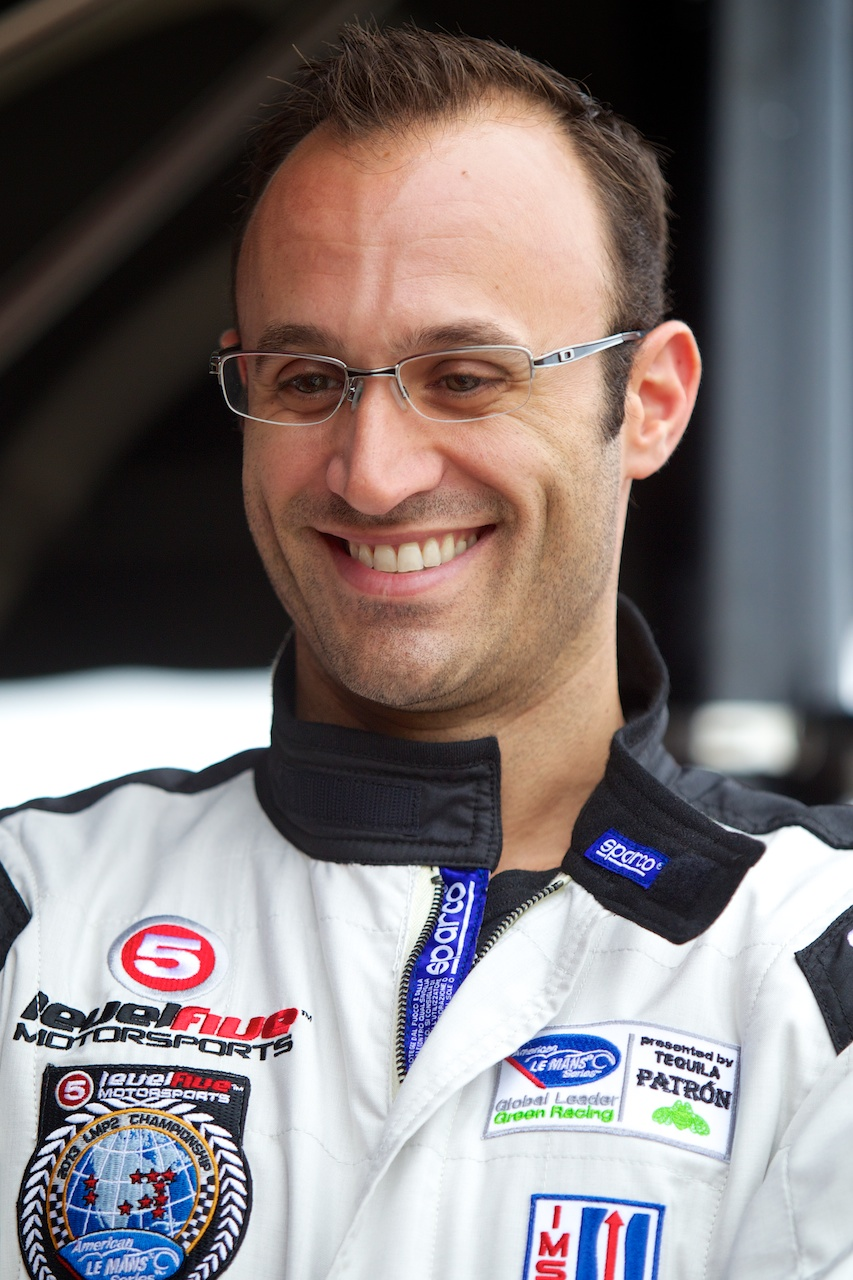
- Cosmo in 2013
- Nationality: (United States) American
- Born: March 12, 1977 (age 49) Port Jefferson, New York, U.S.

United SportsCar Championship career
- Categorisation: FIA Silver (until 2013, 2016–); FIA Gold (2014–2015)
- Former teams: Extreme Speed Motorsports; BGB Motorsports; Orbit Racing; Spirit of Daytona Racing

Previous series
- American Le Mans Series; Rolex Sports Car Series; Star Mazda Championship; Toyota Atlantic Championship

Championship titles
- 2002 1999: Star Mazda Championship; USF2000 American Continental Championship

Awards
- 2005: ALMS Rookie of the Year

Guy Andrew Cosmo (born 12 March 1977 in Port Jefferson, NY) is an American racing driver who competes in the United SportsCar Championship. He is a former American Le Mans Series Rookie-of-the-Year winner who claimed four wins and multiple podium finishes in ALMS competition.

== Early racing career ==
Cosmo's career began in go-karts at the age of 11, earning championships in karting, Formula Ford, F2000 and Star Mazda prior to a limited season in Toyota Atlantic Championship competition. He earned four top-ten finishes in four starts in Atlantics prior to being chosen as a development driver for the new Star Mazda Pro Formula Car.

== Grand-Am ==
Cosmo made his Rolex Sports Car Series and Continental Tire Sports Car Challenge debuts in 2003, scoring three podium finishes in five starts with Cegwa Sport and G&W Motorsports. He earned two victories in two starts in the CTSC STI class in 2003.

In 2006, Cosmo competed in a limited-season with Playboy/Uniden Racing and Spirit of Daytona Racing, earning a season-high second-place result at Miller Motorsports Park and helping take Playboy/Uniden Racing to a fourth-place finish in the DP points standings.

The 2007 season saw Cosmo compete for a variety of teams, including Doran Racing, Blackforest Motorsports, Brumos Racing, Southard Motorsports and Spirit of Daytona Racing, while also enjoying success in CTSC with one victory and two podium finishes in Fountain Motorsports' BMW 330i.

Cosmo competed in the majority of the 2008 and 2009 seasons with Spirit of Daytona Racing, as part of the team's development program with its Lozano Brothers-tuned Porsche Cayenne V8 engine.

Cosmo rejoined BGB Motorsports in 2008 and raced with the team in CTSC competition through 2011, before making several Rolex Series starts in Extreme Speed Motorsports' Ferrari 458 Italia Grand Am in 2012.

== American Le Mans Series ==
Cosmo made his ALMS debut in 2003 with a ninth-place finish at the 12 Hours of Sebring in American Spirit Racing's Riley & Scott MKIIIC.

In 2005, Cosmo earned Rookie-of-the-Year honors after completing his first full season, which included one LMP2 class victory and eight podium finishes in the B-K Motorsports Courage C65 Mazda.

Cosmo again finished third in the LMP2 championship in 2006 in the factory B-K Mazda program, prior to joining Orbit Racing for its GTC campaign in 2009. Cosmo earned three class poles, one race win and two additional podiums in the team's Porsche 911 GT3 Cup car.

Cosmo joined Extreme Speed Motorsports in 2010 as part of its Ferrari GT program, which saw him paired with Patron Spirits CEO Ed Brown from 2010 to 2012.

In 2013, Cosmo and the ESM team switched to the LMP2 class with Honda Performance Development ARX-03b cars, where he teamed with Scott Sharp for the opening six rounds, earning a win at Long Beach.

On August 26, 2013, it was announced that Cosmo had left ESM for Level 5 Motorsports. He won in his team debut with Level 5 at Baltimore, prior to additional podium finishes that season.

In all, Cosmo enjoyed his most successful ALMS season to date in 2013, finishing third in the championship with two wins and nine podium finishes between the two teams.

== United SportsCar Championship ==
Cosmo finished sixth in GTD in the season-opening Rolex 24 at Daytona in the No. 556 Level 5 Motorsports Ferrari 458 Italia GT3 with co-drivers Scott Tucker, Terry Borcheller, Mike LaMarra and Milo Valverde.

== Other accomplishments ==
Cosmo was the overall winner of the 25 Hours of Thunderhill in 2010 in a Mercer Motorsports Porsche 911 GT3 Cup car. He test drove a Ferrari Formula 1 car at Mazda Raceway Laguna Seca in 2012.

== Complete motorsports results ==
=== SCCA National Championship Runoffs ===
Year	Track	Car	Engine	Class	Finish	Start	Status
1997	Mid-Ohio	Swift DB1	Ford	Formula Ford	27	7	Retired
1998	Mid-Ohio	Van Diemen RF97	Ford	Formula Continental	2	4	Running

=== American Open-Wheel racing results ===
(key) (Races in bold indicate pole position, races in italics indicate fastest race lap)

==== USF2000 National Championship ====
Year	Entrant	1	2	3	4	5	6	7	8	9	10	11	12	13	14	Pos	Points
1998	Wright Racing	WDW; 20	PIR	HMS1; 31	HMS2; 28	WGI; 26	WGI; 12	MOH1; 14	MIN; 14	CHA1	CHA2	MOH2; 10	ATL	PPI	PPI	26th	63
1999	Guy Cosmo	PIR	CHA1; 27	CHA2; DNS	MOS; 29	MOS; 9	MOH; 8	ATL	ROA1; 19	ROA2; 13	CTR	MOH; 19	PPI	SEB1; 28	SEB2; 13	20th	48
2000	John Walko Racing	PIR	MOS1	MOS2	IRP1	ROA1	ROA1	TRR	MOS3	WGI1; 30	WGI2; 19	IRP2	ATL1	ATL1		-	0

==== Atlantic Championship ====
Year	Team	1	2	3	4	5	6	7	8	9	10	11	12	Rank	Points	Ref
2001	World Speed Motorsports	LBH; 9	NAZ	MIL	MTL; 10									**17th**	**16**	
2001	Duesenberg Brothers					CLE	TOR	CHI	TRR; 10	ROA; 12	VAN	HOU; 8	LS	**17th**	**16**	

==== Barber Dodge Pro Series ====
Year	1	2	3	4	5	6	7	8	9	10	Rank	Points
2003	STP; 9	MTY	MIL	LAG	POR	CLE	TOR	VAN	MOH	MTL	**25th**	**7**

=== Complete IMSA SportsCar Championship results ===
(key)(Races in bold indicate pole position, Results are overall/class)

Year	Team	Class	Make	Engine	1	2	3	4	5	6	7	8	9	10	11	12	Rank	Points
2014	Marsh Racing	P	Coyote Corvette DP	Chevrolet 5.5L V8	DAY	SIR; 12	LBH	LS	DET	WGL; 6	MSP	IMS	ELK	COA	PET		37th	46
2015	VisitFlorida.com Racing	P	Coyote Corvette DP	Chevrolet 5.5L V8	DAY; 3	SEB	LBH	LGA	DET	WGL	MOS	ELK	COA	PET			24th	31
2020	Performance Tech Motorsports	LMP2	Oreca 07	Gibson GK428 4.2 L V8	DAY	SEB	ELK	ATL	PET	LGA	SEB; 3						20th	30
2021	Gilbert Korthoff Motorsports	GTD	Mercedes-AMG GT3 Evo	Mercedes-AMG M159 6.2 L V8	DAY	SEB	MOH	DET	WGL	WGL; 7	LIM	ELK; 14	LGA	LBH	VIR; 11	PET; 14	37st	593

Sporting positions
Preceded by Scott Bradley	Star Mazda Championship Champion; 2002	Succeeded by Luis Schiavo
