= 2002 Barber Dodge Pro Series =

2002 Barber Dodge Pro Series season

Seasons
- ← 2001 2003 →

The 2002 Barber Dodge Pro Series season was the seventeenth season of the series. All drivers used Dodge powered Michelin shod Reynard 98E chassis.

== Race calendar and results ==
Round	Circuit	Location	Date	Pole position	Fastest lap	Winning driver
1	Sebring International Raceway	(United States) Sebring, Florida	March 16	(United States) A. J. Allmendinger	(United States) A. J. Allmendinger	(United States) A. J. Allmendinger
2	Lime Rock Park	(United States) Lime Rock, Connecticut	May 27	(United States) A. J. Allmendinger	(Brazil) Leonardo Maia	(United States) A. J. Allmendinger
3	Mazda Raceway Laguna Seca	(United States) Monterey County, California	June 9	(Brazil) Rafael Sperafico	(Brazil) Rafael Sperafico	(Brazil) Rafael Sperafico
4	Portland International Raceway	(United States) Portland, Oregon	June 16	(Brazil) Júlio Campos	(United States) A. J. Allmendinger	(United States) A. J. Allmendinger
5	Toronto Street Circuit	(Canada) Toronto	July 7	(Brazil) Rafael Sperafico	(United States) A. J. Allmendinger	(United States) A. J. Allmendinger
6	Cleveland Burke Lakefront Airport	(United States) Cleveland, Ohio	July 13	(United States) Davy Cook	(United States) A. J. Allmendinger	(United States) Davy Cook
7	Concord Pacific Place	(Canada) Vancouver	July 28	(United States) A. J. Allmendinger	(United States) Christian Szymczak	(United States) A. J. Allmendinger
8	Mid-Ohio Sports Car Course	(United States) Lexington, Ohio	August 11	(United States) Christian Szymczak	(Brazil) Rafael Sperafico	(United States) Marc Breuers
9	Road America	(United States) Elkhart Lake, Wisconsin	August 18	(Brazil) Leonardo Maia	(Brazil) Rafael Sperafico	(Brazil) Leonardo Maia
10	Circuit Gilles Villeneuve	(Canada) Montreal	August 25	(United States) A. J. Allmendinger	(Mexico) Memo Rojas	(United States) A. J. Allmendinger

== Final standings ==
Color	Result
Gold	Winner
Silver	2nd place
Bronze	3rd place
Green	4th & 5th place
Light Blue	6th–10th place
Dark Blue	11th place or lower
Purple	Did not finish
Red	Did not qualify (DNQ)
Brown	Withdrawn (Wth)
Black	Disqualified (DSQ)
White	Did not start (DNS)
Blank	Did not participate (DNP)
Blank	Driver replacement (Rpl)
Blank	Injured (Inj)
Blank	No race held (NH)

Rank	Driver	(United States) SEB	(United States) LRP	(United States) LAG	(United States) POR	(Canada) TOR	(United States) CLE	(Canada) VAN	(United States) MOH	(United States) ROA	(Canada) MTL	Points
1	(United States) A. J. Allmendinger	1	1	3	1	1	4	1	3	2	1	189
2	(Brazil) Rafael Sperafico	22	3	1	5	11	5	2	2	8	3	119
3	(United States) Marc Breuers	9	2	7	6	3	3	5	1	10	8	117
4	(Canada) Dan Di Leo	17	6	9	2	5	12	3	4	4	5	98
5	(Mexico) Memo Rojas	14	7	2	4	2	9	16	10	5	2	95
6	(Brazil) Leonardo Maia	6	15	6	7	17	6	17	5	1	4	87
7	(United States) Davy Cook	2	20	5	3	4	1	18	7	19	15	84
8	(United States) Christian Szymczak	5	19	4	20	6	11	7	21	11	21	54
9	(Canada) Josh Beaulieu	7	8	8	12	18	22	6	24	3	23	53
10	(Brazil) Júlio Campos	3	5	23	18	12	2	13	23			49
11	(United States) Josh Rehm		10	10	8	8	10		6		13	47
12	(Mexico) Piero Rodarte	15	11	12	9	14	8	15	13		6	41
13	(United States) Danica Patrick					7	7	4	11		22	35
14	(Mexico) Aurelio López, Jr.	13	12	15	10	20	13	14	12	7	16	32
15	(United States) Chris Baker	11	22	18	19	9	16	11	14	12	19	30
16	(Mexico) Germán Quiroga	20	16	16	16	15	15	8	8	6	20	28
17	(United States) Rhonda Trammel			11	14	10	20	10	17	13	11	27
18	(United States) Tom Fogarty	10	13	13	15	16		9			10	26
19	(Brazil) Nilton Rossoni	4	4									25
20	(Mexico) Javier González	12		14	11				16		7	20
21	(United States) Jon Vannini		14	22	21	13	19		9	9		19
22	(Finland) Hannu Viinikainen	8										8
23	(Colombia) Carlos Lievano		9	17								7
24	(United States) Michael Vukelich								25		9	7
25	(Canada) Mike Richardson	18	21	21	17	19	18	12			14	6
26	(India) Parthiva Sureshwaren			20	13	14						5
27	(United States) Atticus Missner		18				23		18	16	12	4
28	(United States) Jay Ricci								15	14		3
29	(Mexico) José Antonio Ramos									15		1
	(United States) Morgan Davies		17	24			17		19	18		
	(United States) Burt Frisselle			19					22	20		
	(United States) John Hall	16										
	(United States) Roland Isra	19										
	(Japan) Shinji Kashima									17		
	(Ecuador) Charlie Pareja	21										
	(Canada) Diedier Schraenen										17	
	(Luxembourg) Pierre Schroeder						21				18	
	(United States) David Zuber								20			
