= 2014 24 Hours of Daytona =

52nd 24 Hours of Daytona race

Previous: 2013	Next: 2015
Index: Races | Winners

The Daytona International Speedway road course

The 52nd Rolex 24 at Daytona was an endurance sports car racing event held at the Daytona International Speedway, Daytona Beach, Florida, from 23 to 26 January 2014. The 52nd running of the 24 Hours of Daytona was also the inaugural race for the Tudor United SportsCar Championship as well as the newly merged International Motor Sports Association (IMSA) sanctioning body. As part of the new series, Le Mans Prototype and Le Mans GT Endurance-style cars were eligible to participate for the first time in over a decade.

The race was won by Action Express Racing, who led a sweep of the top four positions for Corvettes in the Prototype category. Brazilian Christian Fittipaldi and Portuguese João Barbosa became two-time race winners, while Frenchman Sébastien Bourdais won his first Rolex 24 after holding off the Wayne Taylor Racing Corvette by a second and a half at the finish. The GTLM was won by Porsche North America, whose 911 RSR beat out the Team RLL BMW. The Prototype Challenge category was led by CORE Autosport ahead of 8Star Motorsports. The GTD class victory was originally awarded to the Flying Lizard Motorsports Audi following a post-race penalty for Level 5 Motorsports' Ferrari, but IMSA later rescinded the penalty, promoting the Ferrari to first place in class.

An incident marred the race during its third hour when Memo Gidley's GAINSCO Corvette ran into the back of the slowed Risi Ferrari of Matteo Malucelli. Officials halted the race for approximately one hour while both drivers were extracted from their cars. Both were held at Halifax Medical Center for several days.

== Background ==
=== Preview ===
Daytona International Speedway, where the race was held

NASCAR founder Bill France Sr., who built Daytona International Speedway in 1959, conceived of the 24 Hours of Daytona to attract European sports-car endurance racing to the United States and provide international exposure to the speedway. It is informally considered part of the Triple Crown of Endurance Racing, with the 12 Hours of Sebring and the 24 Hours of Le Mans.

International Motor Sports Association (IMSA) president Scott Atherton confirmed that the race was part of the 2014 United SportsCar Championship schedule in September 2013. It was the first year that the race was part of the series calendar, and the 62nd 12 Hours of Sebring. The race was the first of 2014's thirteen scheduled IMSA automobile endurance races, and the first of four North American Endurance Cup (NAEC) events. The race take place at the 12-turn 3.56-mile (5.73 km) Daytona International Speedway in Daytona Beach, Florida from January 25 to 26.

== Qualifying ==
Pos.	Class	No.	Team	Time	Gap	Grid
1	P	99	(United States) GAINSCO/Bob Stallings Racing	1:38.270	_	1‡
2	P	90	(United States) Spirit of Daytona Racing	1:38.487	+0.217	2
3	P	5	(United States) Action Express Racing	1:38.658	+0.388	3
4	P	9	(United States) Action Express Racing	1:38.838	+0.568	4
5	P	02	(United States) Chip Ganassi Racing with Felix Sabates	1:38.948	+0.678	5
6	P	10	(United States) Wayne Taylor Racing	1:39.023	+0.753	6
7	P	0	(United States) DeltaWing Racing Cars	1:39.270	+1.000	7
8	P	01	(United States) Chip Ganassi Racing with Felix Sabates	1:39.424	+1.154	8
9	P	60	(United States) Michael Shank Racing with Curb/Agajanian	1:39.761	+1.491	9
10	P	6	(United States) Muscle Milk Pickett Racing	1:39.829	+1.519	10
11	P	31	(United States) Marsh Racing	1:40.570	+2.300	11
12	P	50	(United States) Highway to Help	1:41.587	+3.317	12
13	PC	54	(United States) CORE Autosport	1:41.777	+3.507	13‡
14	PC	8	(United States) Starworks Motorsport	1:41.815	+3.545	14
15	P	2	(United States) Extreme Speed Motorsports	1:41.885	+3.615	15
16	PC	09	(United States) RSR Racing	1:41.932	+3.662	16
17	PC	38	(United States) Performance Tech Motorsports	1:42.053	+3.783	17
18	P	1	(United States) Extreme Speed Motorsports	1:42.157	+3.887	18
19	PC	08	(United States) RSR Racing	1:42.187	+3.917	19
20	PC	87	(United States) BAR1 Motorsports	1:42.416	+4.146	20
21	PC	52	(United States) PR1/Mathiesen Motorsports	1:43.156	+4.886	21
22	P	42	(France) OAK Racing	1:43.420	+5.150	22
23	PC	7	(United States) Starworks Motorsport	1:44.126	+5.856	23
24	GTLM	91	(United States) SRT Motorsports	1:44.506	+6.236	24‡
25	GTLM	911	(United States) Porsche North America	1:44.582	+6.312	25
26	GTLM	93	(United States) SRT Motorsports	1:44.617	+6.347	26
27	GTLM	4	(United States) Corvette Racing	1:44.729	+6.459	27
28	GTLM	912	(United States) Porsche North America	1:44.746	+6.476	28
29	GTLM	97	(United Kingdom) Aston Martin Racing	1:45.439	+7.169	29
30	GTLM	55	(United States) BMW Team RLL	1:45.657	+7.397	30
31	GTLM	56	(United States) BMW Team RLL	1:45.672	+7.402	31
32	GTLM	57	(United States) Krohn Racing	1:46.863	+8.593	32
33	GTD	63	(United States) Scuderia Corsa	1:47.028	+8.758	33‡
34	GTD	65	(United States) Scuderia Corsa	1:47.052	+8.782	34
35	GTD	007	(United States) TRG-AMR	1:47.055	+8.785	35
36	GTD	555	(United States) Level 5 Motorsports	1:47.062	+8.792	36
37	GTD	33	(United States) Riley Motorsports	1:47.255	+8.985	37
38	GTD	556	(United States) Level 5 Motorsports	1:47.348	+9.078	38
39	GTD	71	(United States) Park Place Motorsports	1:47.354	+9.084	39
40	GTD	72	(Russia) SMP/ESM Racing	1:47.361	+9.091	40
41	GTD	009	(United States) TRG-AMR	1:47.404	+9.134	41
42	GTD	94	(United States) Turner Motorsport	1:47.418	+9.148	42
43	GTD	27	(United States) Dempsey Racing	1:47.490	+9.220	43
44	GTD	18	(United States) Mühlner Motorsports America	1:47.561	+9.291	44
45	GTD	44	(United States) Magnus Racing	1:47.572	+9.302	45
46	GTD	22	(United States) Alex Job Racing	1:47.647	+9.377	46
47	GTD	58	(United States) Snow Racing	1:47.649	+9.379	47
48	GTD	30	(United States) NGT Motorsport	1:47.742	+9.472	48
49	GTD	73	(United States) Park Place Motorsports	1:47.749	+9.479	49
50	GTD	23	(United States) Team Seattle/Alex Job Racing	1:47.952	+9.682	50
51	GTD	45	(United States) Flying Lizard Motorsports	1:48.045	+9.775	51
52	GTD	81	(United States) GB Autosport	1:48.049	+9.779	52
53	GTD	35	(United States) Flying Lizard Motorsports	1:48.140	+9.870	53
54	GTD	32	(United States) GMG Racing	1:48.381	+10.111	54
55	GTD	51	(Italy) Spirit of Race	1:48.438	+10.168	55
56	GTD	28	(United States) Dempsey Racing	1:48.741	+10.471	56
57	GTD	64	(United States) Scuderia Corsa	1:48.758	+10.488	57
58	GTD	19	(United States) Mühlner Motorsports America	1:48.821	+10.551	58
59	P	70	(United States) Speedsource	1:49.734	+11.464	59
60	P	07	(United States) Speedsource	1:50.251	+11.981	60
61	GTLM	62	(United States) Risi Competizione	Did not participate		61
62	GTLM	3	(United States) Corvette Racing	Did not participate		62
63	PC	25	(United States) 8Star Motorsports	Did not participate		63
64	GTD	49	(Italy) Spirit of Race	Did not participate		64
65	P	78	(United States) Starworks Motorsport	Did not participate		65^{1}
66	GTD	48	(United States) Paul Miller Racing	Did not participate		66^{2}
67	GTD	46	(United States) Fall-Line Motorsports	Did not participate		67^{3}

Notes:

- ^1 – The No. 78 Starworks Motorsport entry was sent to the rear of the Prototype field for violating competition rules regarding the car's ride height. Additionally, the car had an unapproved aerodynamic device.
- ^2 – The No. 48 Paul Miller Racing Audi R8 was sent to the rear of the GTD field for violating competition rules regarding the car's rear wing.
- ^3 – The No. 46 Fall-Line Motorsports Audi R8 was sent to the rear of the GTD field for violating competition rules regarding the car's ride height.

== Results ==
=== Race result ===
Final race classification
Pos	Class	No.	Team	Drivers	Chassis	Tire	Laps	Time/Retired
Pos	Class	No.	Team	Drivers	Engine	Tire	Laps	Time/Retired
1	P	5	(United States) Action Express Racing	(Portugal) João Barbosa (Brazil) Christian Fittipaldi (France) Sébastien Bourdais	Chevrolet Corvette DP	C	695	24:00:34.760
1	P	5	(United States) Action Express Racing	(Portugal) João Barbosa (Brazil) Christian Fittipaldi (France) Sébastien Bourdais	Chevrolet LS9 5.5 L V8	C	695	24:00:34.760
2	P	10	(United States) Wayne Taylor Racing	(South Africa) Wayne Taylor (United States) Ricky Taylor (United States) Jordan Taylor (Italy) Max Angelelli	Chevrolet Corvette DP	C	695	+ 1.461
2	P	10	(United States) Wayne Taylor Racing	(South Africa) Wayne Taylor (United States) Ricky Taylor (United States) Jordan Taylor (Italy) Max Angelelli	Chevrolet LS9 5.5 L V8	C	695	+ 1.461
3	P	9	(United States) Action Express Racing	(United States) Brian Frisselle (United States) Burt Frisselle (France) Fabien Giroix (Australia) John Martin	Chevrolet Corvette DP	C	695	+ 19.489
3	P	9	(United States) Action Express Racing	(United States) Brian Frisselle (United States) Burt Frisselle (France) Fabien Giroix (Australia) John Martin	Chevrolet LS9 5.5 L V8	C	695	+ 19.489
4	P	90	(United States) Spirit of Daytona Racing	(Canada) Michael Valiante (United Kingdom) Richard Westbrook (Germany) Mike Rockenfeller	Chevrolet Corvette DP	C	693	+ 2 Laps
4	P	90	(United States) Spirit of Daytona Racing	(Canada) Michael Valiante (United Kingdom) Richard Westbrook (Germany) Mike Rockenfeller	Chevrolet LS9 5.5 L V8	C	693	+ 2 Laps
5	P	6	(United States) Muscle Milk Pickett Racing	(Germany) Klaus Graf (Germany) Lucas Luhr (United Kingdom) Alex Brundle	Oreca 03	C	692	+ 3 Laps
5	P	6	(United States) Muscle Milk Pickett Racing	(Germany) Klaus Graf (Germany) Lucas Luhr (United Kingdom) Alex Brundle	Nissan VK45DE 4.5 L V8	C	692	+ 3 Laps
6	GTLM	911	(United States) Porsche North America	(United Kingdom) Nick Tandy (Austria) Richard Lietz (France) Patrick Pilet	Porsche 911 RSR	M	679	+ 16 Laps
6	GTLM	911	(United States) Porsche North America	(United Kingdom) Nick Tandy (Austria) Richard Lietz (France) Patrick Pilet	Porsche 4.0 L Flat-6	M	679	+ 16 Laps
7	GTLM	55	(United States) BMW Team RLL	(United States) Bill Auberlen (United States) Joey Hand (United Kingdom) Andy Priaulx (Belgium) Maxime Martin	BMW Z4 GTE	M	679	+ 16 Laps
7	GTLM	55	(United States) BMW Team RLL	(United States) Bill Auberlen (United States) Joey Hand (United Kingdom) Andy Priaulx (Belgium) Maxime Martin	BMW 4.4 L V8	M	679	+ 16 Laps
8	P	42	(France) OAK Racing	(France) Olivier Pla (Russia) Roman Rusinov (Colombia) Gustavo Yacamán (United Kingdom) Oliver Webb	Morgan LMP2	C	678	+ 17 Laps
8	P	42	(France) OAK Racing	(France) Olivier Pla (Russia) Roman Rusinov (Colombia) Gustavo Yacamán (United Kingdom) Oliver Webb	Nissan VK45DE 4.5 L V8	C	678	+ 17 Laps
9	PC	54	(United States) CORE Autosport	(United States) Colin Braun (United States) Jon Bennett (United States) James Gue (Canada) Mark Wilkins	Oreca FLM09	C	678	+ 17 Laps
9	PC	54	(United States) CORE Autosport	(United States) Colin Braun (United States) Jon Bennett (United States) James Gue (Canada) Mark Wilkins	Chevrolet 6.2 L V8	C	678	+ 17 Laps
10	PC	25	(United States) 8Star Motorsports	(Venezuela) Enzo Potolicchio (United Kingdom) Tom Kimber-Smith (United Kingdom) Robert Huff (United States) Michael Marsal	Oreca FLM09	C	677	+ 18 Laps
10	PC	25	(United States) 8Star Motorsports	(Venezuela) Enzo Potolicchio (United Kingdom) Tom Kimber-Smith (United Kingdom) Robert Huff (United States) Michael Marsal	Chevrolet 6.2 L V8	C	677	+ 18 Laps
11	P	2	(United States) Extreme Speed Motorsports	(United States) Ed Brown (United States) Johannes van Overbeek (United States) Anthony Lazzaro (France) Simon Pagenaud	HPD ARX-03b	C	676	+ 19 Laps
11	P	2	(United States) Extreme Speed Motorsports	(United States) Ed Brown (United States) Johannes van Overbeek (United States) Anthony Lazzaro (France) Simon Pagenaud	Honda HR28TT 2.8 L Turbo V6	C	676	+ 19 Laps
12	GTLM	91	(United States) SRT Motorsports	(Germany) Dominik Farnbacher (Belgium) Marc Goossens (United States) Ryan Hunter-Reay	SRT Viper GTS-R	M	675	+ 20 Laps
12	GTLM	91	(United States) SRT Motorsports	(Germany) Dominik Farnbacher (Belgium) Marc Goossens (United States) Ryan Hunter-Reay	SRT 8.0 L V10	M	675	+ 20 Laps
13	PC	38	(United States) Performance Tech Motorsports	(United States) Tomy Drissi (Canada) David Ostella (Brazil) Raphael Matos (Brazil) Gabriel Casagrande (Brazil) Júlio Campos	Oreca FLM09	C	669	+ 26 Laps
13	PC	38	(United States) Performance Tech Motorsports	(United States) Tomy Drissi (Canada) David Ostella (Brazil) Raphael Matos (Brazil) Gabriel Casagrande (Brazil) Júlio Campos	Chevrolet 6.2 L V8	C	669	+ 26 Laps
14	GTLM	56	(United States) BMW Team RLL	(United States) Graham Rahal (United States) John Edwards (Germany) Dirk Müller (Germany) Dirk Werner	BMW Z4 GTE	M	668	+ 27 Laps
14	GTLM	56	(United States) BMW Team RLL	(United States) Graham Rahal (United States) John Edwards (Germany) Dirk Müller (Germany) Dirk Werner	BMW 4.4 L V8	M	668	+ 27 Laps
15 DNF	P	02	(United States) Chip Ganassi Racing with Felix Sabates	(Brazil) Tony Kanaan (New Zealand) Scott Dixon (United States) Kyle Larson (United Kingdom) Marino Franchitti	Riley MkXXVI	C	667	Mechanical
15 DNF	P	02	(United States) Chip Ganassi Racing with Felix Sabates	(Brazil) Tony Kanaan (New Zealand) Scott Dixon (United States) Kyle Larson (United Kingdom) Marino Franchitti	Ford EcoBoost 3.5 L Turbo V6	C	667	Mechanical
16	GTLM	4	(United States) Corvette Racing	(United States) Tommy Milner (United Kingdom) Oliver Gavin (United Kingdom) Robin Liddell	Chevrolet Corvette C7.R	M	666	+ 29 Laps
16	GTLM	4	(United States) Corvette Racing	(United States) Tommy Milner (United Kingdom) Oliver Gavin (United Kingdom) Robin Liddell	Chevrolet LT5.5 5.5 L V8	M	666	+ 29 Laps
17 DNF	PC	52	(United States) PR1/Mathiesen Motorsports	(United States) Mike Gausch (United States) Frankie Montecalvo (United States) Gunnar Jeannette (United States) David Cheng	Oreca FLM09	C	662	+ 33 Laps
17 DNF	PC	52	(United States) PR1/Mathiesen Motorsports	(United States) Mike Gausch (United States) Frankie Montecalvo (United States) Gunnar Jeannette (United States) David Cheng	Chevrolet 6.2 L V8	C	662	+ 33 Laps
18	GTD	555	(United States) Level 5 Motorsports	(United States) Scott Tucker (United States) Bill Sweedler (United States) Townsend Bell (United States) Jeff Segal (Italy) Alessandro Pier Guidi	Ferrari 458 Italia GT3	C	662	+ 33 Laps
18	GTD	555	(United States) Level 5 Motorsports	(United States) Scott Tucker (United States) Bill Sweedler (United States) Townsend Bell (United States) Jeff Segal (Italy) Alessandro Pier Guidi	Ferrari 4.5 L V8	C	662	+ 33 Laps
19	GTD	45	(United States) Flying Lizard Motorsports	(United States) Spencer Pumpelly (United States) Tim Pappas (Venezuela) Nelson Canache Jr. (Germany) Markus Winkelhock	Audi R8 LMS	C	662	+ 33 Laps
19	GTD	45	(United States) Flying Lizard Motorsports	(United States) Spencer Pumpelly (United States) Tim Pappas (Venezuela) Nelson Canache Jr. (Germany) Markus Winkelhock	Audi 5.2 L V10	C	662	+ 33 Laps
20	GTD	58	(United States) Snow Racing	(Belgium) Jan Heylen (United States) Madison Snow (Germany) Marco Seefried	Porsche 911 GT America	C	662	+ 33 Laps
20	GTD	58	(United States) Snow Racing	(Belgium) Jan Heylen (United States) Madison Snow (Germany) Marco Seefried	Porsche 4.0 L Flat-6	C	662	+ 33 Laps
21	GTD	72	(Russia) SMP/ESM Racing	(Russia) Sergey Zlobin (Russia) Boris Rotenberg (Russia) Mikhail Aleshin (Italy) Maurizio Mediani (Finland) Mika Salo	Ferrari 458 Italia GT3	C	662	+ 33 Laps
21	GTD	72	(Russia) SMP/ESM Racing	(Russia) Sergey Zlobin (Russia) Boris Rotenberg (Russia) Mikhail Aleshin (Italy) Maurizio Mediani (Finland) Mika Salo	Ferrari 4.5 L V8	C	662	+ 33 Laps
22	GTD	35	(United States) Flying Lizard Motorsports	(United States) Seth Neiman (South Africa) Dion von Moltke (United Kingdom) Alessandro Latif (Portugal) Filipe Albuquerque	Audi R8 LMS	C	661	+ 34 Laps
22	GTD	35	(United States) Flying Lizard Motorsports	(United States) Seth Neiman (South Africa) Dion von Moltke (United Kingdom) Alessandro Latif (Portugal) Filipe Albuquerque	Audi 5.2 L V10	C	661	+ 34 Laps
23	GTD	556	(United States) Level 5 Motorsports	(United States) Scott Tucker (United States) Mike LaMarra (United States) Terry Borcheller (United States) Guy Cosmo (Costa Rica) Emilio Valverde	Ferrari 458 Italia GT3	C	661	+ 34 Laps
23	GTD	556	(United States) Level 5 Motorsports	(United States) Scott Tucker (United States) Mike LaMarra (United States) Terry Borcheller (United States) Guy Cosmo (Costa Rica) Emilio Valverde	Ferrari 4.5 L V8	C	661	+ 34 Laps
24	PC	8	(United States) Starworks Motorsport	(Netherlands) Renger van der Zande (United States) Eric Lux (United Kingdom) Sam Bird (Germany) Mirco Schultis	Oreca FLM09	C	659	+ 36 Laps
24	PC	8	(United States) Starworks Motorsport	(Netherlands) Renger van der Zande (United States) Eric Lux (United Kingdom) Sam Bird (Germany) Mirco Schultis	Chevrolet 6.2 L V8	C	659	+ 36 Laps
25	GTD	94	(United States) Turner Motorsport	(Canada) Paul Dalla Lana (United States) Dane Cameron (Brazil) Augusto Farfus (Finland) Markus Palttala	BMW Z4 GT3	C	659	+ 36 Laps
25	GTD	94	(United States) Turner Motorsport	(Canada) Paul Dalla Lana (United States) Dane Cameron (Brazil) Augusto Farfus (Finland) Markus Palttala	BMW 4.4 L V8	C	659	+ 36 Laps
26	GTD	22	(United States) Alex Job Racing	(United States) Cooper MacNeil (United States) Leh Keen (United States) Shane Lewis (Canada) Louis-Philippe Dumoulin (New Zealand) Shane van Gisbergen	Porsche 911 GT America	C	656	+ 39 Laps
26	GTD	22	(United States) Alex Job Racing	(United States) Cooper MacNeil (United States) Leh Keen (United States) Shane Lewis (Canada) Louis-Philippe Dumoulin (New Zealand) Shane van Gisbergen	Porsche 4.0 L Flat-6	C	656	+ 39 Laps
27	GTLM	93	(United States) SRT Motorsports	(United States) Jonathan Bomarito (Canada) Kuno Wittmer (United Kingdom) Rob Bell	SRT Viper GTS-R	M	653	+ 42 Laps
27	GTLM	93	(United States) SRT Motorsports	(United States) Jonathan Bomarito (Canada) Kuno Wittmer (United Kingdom) Rob Bell	SRT 8.0 L V10	M	653	+ 42 Laps
28	GTD	30	(United States) NGT Motorsport	(Venezuela) Henrique Cisneros (Poland) Kuba Giermaziak (Denmark) Christina Nielsen (Denmark) Nicki Thiim	Porsche 911 GT America	C	652	+ 43 Laps
28	GTD	30	(United States) NGT Motorsport	(Venezuela) Henrique Cisneros (Poland) Kuba Giermaziak (Denmark) Christina Nielsen (Denmark) Nicki Thiim	Porsche 4.0 L Flat-6	C	652	+ 43 Laps
29	GTD	65	(United States) Scuderia Corsa	(Brazil) Francisco Longo (Brazil) Daniel Serra (Brazil) Xandinho Negrão (Brazil) Marcos Gomes	Ferrari 458 Italia GT3	C	649	+ 46 Laps
29	GTD	65	(United States) Scuderia Corsa	(Brazil) Francisco Longo (Brazil) Daniel Serra (Brazil) Xandinho Negrão (Brazil) Marcos Gomes	Ferrari 4.5 L V8	C	649	+ 46 Laps
30	GTD	63	(United States) Scuderia Corsa	(United States) Jeff Westphal (Italy) Alessandro Balzan (Italy) Lorenzo Casé (Finland) Toni Vilander	Ferrari 458 Italia GT3	C	647	+ 48 Laps
30	GTD	63	(United States) Scuderia Corsa	(United States) Jeff Westphal (Italy) Alessandro Balzan (Italy) Lorenzo Casé (Finland) Toni Vilander	Ferrari 4.5 L V8	C	647	+ 48 Laps
31	GTD	44	(United States) Magnus Racing	(United States) Andy Lally (United States) John Potter (Germany) Wolf Henzler (Canada) Jean-François Dumoulin	Porsche 911 GT America	C	645	+ 50 Laps
31	GTD	44	(United States) Magnus Racing	(United States) Andy Lally (United States) John Potter (Germany) Wolf Henzler (Canada) Jean-François Dumoulin	Porsche 4.0 L Flat-6	C	645	+ 50 Laps
32	GTD	73	(United States) Park Place Motorsports	(France) Kévin Estre (United States) Patrick Lindsey (United States) Connor De Phillippi (United States) Jason Hart (United States) Mike Vess	Porsche 911 GT America	C	645	+ 50 Laps
32	GTD	73	(United States) Park Place Motorsports	(France) Kévin Estre (United States) Patrick Lindsey (United States) Connor De Phillippi (United States) Jason Hart (United States) Mike Vess	Porsche 4.0 L Flat-6	C	645	+ 50 Laps
33	GTD	64	(United States) Scuderia Corsa	(United States) Rod Randall (Canada) Ken Wilden (Canada) John Farano (Canada) David Empringham (United States) Billy Johnson	Ferrari 458 Italia GT3	C	645	+ 50 Laps
33	GTD	64	(United States) Scuderia Corsa	(United States) Rod Randall (Canada) Ken Wilden (Canada) John Farano (Canada) David Empringham (United States) Billy Johnson	Ferrari 4.5 L V8	C	645	+ 50 Laps
34	GTD	23	(United States) Team Seattle/Alex Job Racing	(United States) Ian James (Germany) Mario Farnbacher (Germany) Marco Holzer (Spain) Alex Riberas	Porsche 911 GT America	C	639	+ 56 Laps
34	GTD	23	(United States) Team Seattle/Alex Job Racing	(United States) Ian James (Germany) Mario Farnbacher (Germany) Marco Holzer (Spain) Alex Riberas	Porsche 4.0 L Flat-6	C	639	+ 56 Laps
35 DNF	P	50	(United States) Highway to Help	(United States) Byron DeFoor (United States) Jim Pace (United States) Frank Beck (United States) David Hinton	Riley MkXXVI	C	631	Retired
35 DNF	P	50	(United States) Highway to Help	(United States) Byron DeFoor (United States) Jim Pace (United States) Frank Beck (United States) David Hinton	Dinan-BMW 5.0 L V8	C	631	Retired
36	GTD	48	(United States) Paul Miller Racing	(United States) Bryce Miller (United Kingdom) Matthew Bell (Germany) René Rast (Germany) Christopher Haase	Audi R8 LMS	C	626	+ 69 Laps
36	GTD	48	(United States) Paul Miller Racing	(United States) Bryce Miller (United Kingdom) Matthew Bell (Germany) René Rast (Germany) Christopher Haase	Audi 5.2 L V10	C	626	+ 69 Laps
37	GTLM	57	(United States) Krohn Racing	(United States) Tracy Krohn (Sweden) Niclas Jönsson (Italy) Andrea Bertolini (United Kingdom) Peter Dumbreck	Ferrari 458 Italia GT2	M	625	+ 70 Laps
37	GTLM	57	(United States) Krohn Racing	(United States) Tracy Krohn (Sweden) Niclas Jönsson (Italy) Andrea Bertolini (United Kingdom) Peter Dumbreck	Ferrari 4.5 L V8	M	625	+ 70 Laps
38	GTD	51	(Italy) Spirit of Race	(Republic of Ireland) Matt Griffin (Italy) Marco Cioci (Italy) Michele Rugolo (South Africa) Jack Gerber	Ferrari 458 Italia GT3	C	620	+ 75 Laps
38	GTD	51	(Italy) Spirit of Race	(Republic of Ireland) Matt Griffin (Italy) Marco Cioci (Italy) Michele Rugolo (South Africa) Jack Gerber	Ferrari 4.5 L V8	C	620	+ 75 Laps
39	GTD	49	(Italy) Spirit of Race	(Italy) Piergiuseppe Perazzini (Italy) Gianluca Roda (Italy) Paolo Ruberti (Italy) Davide Rigon	Ferrari 458 Italia GT3	C	618	+ 77 Laps
39	GTD	49	(Italy) Spirit of Race	(Italy) Piergiuseppe Perazzini (Italy) Gianluca Roda (Italy) Paolo Ruberti (Italy) Davide Rigon	Ferrari 4.5 L V8	C	618	+ 77 Laps
40	GTD	33	(United States) Riley Motorsports	(Netherlands) Jeroen Bleekemolen (Netherlands) Sebastiaan Bleekemolen (United States) Ben Keating (France) Emmanuel Collard	SRT Viper GT3-R	C	615	+ 80 Laps
40	GTD	33	(United States) Riley Motorsports	(Netherlands) Jeroen Bleekemolen (Netherlands) Sebastiaan Bleekemolen (United States) Ben Keating (France) Emmanuel Collard	SRT 8.0 L V10	C	615	+ 80 Laps
41	P	31	(United States) Marsh Racing	(United States) Eric Curran (United States) Boris Said (Italy) Max Papis (United Kingdom) Bradley Smith	Chevrolet Corvette DP	C	613	+ 82 Laps
41	P	31	(United States) Marsh Racing	(United States) Eric Curran (United States) Boris Said (Italy) Max Papis (United Kingdom) Bradley Smith	Chevrolet LS9 5.5 L V8	C	613	+ 82 Laps
42 DNF	PC	7	(United States) Starworks Motorsport	(Germany) Pierre Kaffer (Venezuela) Alex Popow (Canada) Kyle Marcelli (Mexico) Martín Fuentes (Spain) Isaac Tutumlu	Oreca FLM09	C	612	Fire
42 DNF	PC	7	(United States) Starworks Motorsport	(Germany) Pierre Kaffer (Venezuela) Alex Popow (Canada) Kyle Marcelli (Mexico) Martín Fuentes (Spain) Isaac Tutumlu	Chevrolet 6.2 L V8	C	612	Fire
43 DNF	P	01	(United States) Chip Ganassi Racing with Felix Sabates	(United States) Scott Pruett (Mexico) Memo Rojas (United States) Jamie McMurray (United States) Sage Karam	Riley MkXXVI	C	610	Mechanical
43 DNF	P	01	(United States) Chip Ganassi Racing with Felix Sabates	(United States) Scott Pruett (Mexico) Memo Rojas (United States) Jamie McMurray (United States) Sage Karam	Ford EcoBoost 3.5 L Turbo V6	C	610	Mechanical
44	GTLM	97	(United Kingdom) Aston Martin Racing	(Germany) Stefan Mücke (United Kingdom) Darren Turner (New Zealand) Richie Stanaway (Portugal) Pedro Lamy (Canada) Paul Dalla Lana	Aston Martin Vantage GTE	M	610	+ 85 Laps
44	GTLM	97	(United Kingdom) Aston Martin Racing	(Germany) Stefan Mücke (United Kingdom) Darren Turner (New Zealand) Richie Stanaway (Portugal) Pedro Lamy (Canada) Paul Dalla Lana	Aston Martin 4.5 L V8	M	610	+ 85 Laps
45	GTD	19	(United States) Mühlner Motorsports America	(United States) Jim Taggart (United States) Mark Kvamme (United States) Jim Michaelian (United States) Robert Gewirtz (United States) Bob Doyle (United States) Randy Pobst	Porsche 911 GT America	C	603	+ 92 Laps
45	GTD	19	(United States) Mühlner Motorsports America	(United States) Jim Taggart (United States) Mark Kvamme (United States) Jim Michaelian (United States) Robert Gewirtz (United States) Bob Doyle (United States) Randy Pobst	Porsche 4.0 L Flat-6	C	603	+ 92 Laps
46 DNF	GTD	28	(United States) Dempsey Racing	(Austria) Klaus Bachler (Germany) Christian Engelhart (Switzerland) Rolf Ineichen (United States) Lance Willsey	Porsche 911 GT America	C	601	Retired
46 DNF	GTD	28	(United States) Dempsey Racing	(Austria) Klaus Bachler (Germany) Christian Engelhart (Switzerland) Rolf Ineichen (United States) Lance Willsey	Porsche 4.0 L Flat-6	C	601	Retired
47	P	60	(United States) Michael Shank Racing with Curb/Agajanian	(United States) John Pew (Brazil) Oswaldo Negri Jr. (United States) A. J. Allmendinger (United Kingdom) Justin Wilson	Riley MkXXVI	C	599	+ 96 Laps
47	P	60	(United States) Michael Shank Racing with Curb/Agajanian	(United States) John Pew (Brazil) Oswaldo Negri Jr. (United States) A. J. Allmendinger (United Kingdom) Justin Wilson	Ford EcoBoost 3.5 L Turbo V6	C	599	+ 96 Laps
48	GTD	007	(United States) TRG-AMR	(Australia) James Davison (United States) Al Carter (United States) David Block (United States) Brandon Davis	Aston Martin V12 Vantage GT3	C	580	+ 115 Laps
48	GTD	007	(United States) TRG-AMR	(Australia) James Davison (United States) Al Carter (United States) David Block (United States) Brandon Davis	Aston Martin 6.0 L V12	C	580	+ 115 Laps
49	GTD	71	(United States) Park Place Motorsports	(United States) Jim Norman (United States) Craig Stanton (Austria) Norbert Siedler (Germany) Timo Bernhard	Porsche 911 GT America	C	566	+ 129 Laps
49	GTD	71	(United States) Park Place Motorsports	(United States) Jim Norman (United States) Craig Stanton (Austria) Norbert Siedler (Germany) Timo Bernhard	Porsche 4.0 L Flat-6	C	566	+ 129 Laps
50	GTD	27	(United States) Dempsey Racing	(United States) Patrick Dempsey (United States) Joe Foster (United States) Andrew Davis (Germany) Marc Lieb	Porsche 911 GT America	C	566	+ 129 Laps
50	GTD	27	(United States) Dempsey Racing	(United States) Patrick Dempsey (United States) Joe Foster (United States) Andrew Davis (Germany) Marc Lieb	Porsche 4.0 L Flat-6	C	566	+ 129 Laps
51	GTD	81	(United States) GB Autosport	(United States) Bob Faieta (United States) Michael Avenatti (Republic of Ireland) Damien Faulkner (Netherlands) Patrick Huisman	Porsche 911 GT America	C	560	+ 135 Lpas
51	GTD	81	(United States) GB Autosport	(United States) Bob Faieta (United States) Michael Avenatti (Republic of Ireland) Damien Faulkner (Netherlands) Patrick Huisman	Porsche 4.0 L Flat-6	C	560	+ 135 Lpas
52	GTD	009	(United States) TRG-AMR	(United Kingdom) Jonathan Adam (United Kingdom) Calum Lockie (United States) Pete McIntosh II (United States) Robert Nimkoff (Canada) Max Riddle	Aston Martin V12 Vantage GT3	C	516	+ 179 Laps
52	GTD	009	(United States) TRG-AMR	(United Kingdom) Jonathan Adam (United Kingdom) Calum Lockie (United States) Pete McIntosh II (United States) Robert Nimkoff (Canada) Max Riddle	Aston Martin 6.0 L V12	C	516	+ 179 Laps
53 DNF	GTD	18	(United States) Mühlner Motorsports America	(United States) Bardley Blum (United States) Ronald Zitza (New Zealand) Earl Bamber (Switzerland) Alexandre Imperatori (Italy) Eugenio Amos	Porsche 911 GT America	C	492	Crash
53 DNF	GTD	18	(United States) Mühlner Motorsports America	(United States) Bardley Blum (United States) Ronald Zitza (New Zealand) Earl Bamber (Switzerland) Alexandre Imperatori (Italy) Eugenio Amos	Porsche 4.0 L Flat-6	C	492	Crash
54 DNF	GTLM	912	(United States) Porsche North America	(United States) Patrick Long (Denmark) Michael Christensen (Germany) Jörg Bergmeister	Porsche 911 RSR	M	489	Mechanical
54 DNF	GTLM	912	(United States) Porsche North America	(United States) Patrick Long (Denmark) Michael Christensen (Germany) Jörg Bergmeister	Porsche 4.0 L Flat-6	M	489	Mechanical
55	PC	87	(United States) BAR1 Motorsports	(United States) Sean Rayhall (United States) Doug Bielefeld (United States) Gaston Kearby (United States) Tõnis Kasemets (Australia) James Kovacic	Oreca FLM09	C	460	+ 235 Laps
55	PC	87	(United States) BAR1 Motorsports	(United States) Sean Rayhall (United States) Doug Bielefeld (United States) Gaston Kearby (United States) Tõnis Kasemets (Australia) James Kovacic	Chevrolet 6.2 L V8	C	460	+ 235 Laps
56 DNF	P	07	(United States) SpeedSource	(United States) Tristan Nunez (United States) Joel Miller (France) Tristan Vautier	Mazda Prototype	C	445	Retired
56 DNF	P	07	(United States) SpeedSource	(United States) Tristan Nunez (United States) Joel Miller (France) Tristan Vautier	Mazda Skyactiv-D 2.2 L Turbo I4 (Diesel)	C	445	Retired
57 DNF	P	70	(United States) SpeedSource	(Canada) Sylvain Tremblay (Canada) James Hinchcliffe (United States) Tom Long	Mazda Prototype	C	369	Mechanical
57 DNF	P	70	(United States) SpeedSource	(Canada) Sylvain Tremblay (Canada) James Hinchcliffe (United States) Tom Long	Mazda Skyactiv-D 2.2 L Turbo I4 (Diesel)	C	369	Mechanical
58 DNF	PC	08	(United States) RSR Racing	(Canada) Chris Cumming (Canada) Alex Tagliani (United States) Rusty Mitchell (United States) Conor Daly	Oreca FLM09	C	361	Crash
58 DNF	PC	08	(United States) RSR Racing	(Canada) Chris Cumming (Canada) Alex Tagliani (United States) Rusty Mitchell (United States) Conor Daly	Chevrolet 6.2 L V8	C	361	Crash
59 DNF	P	1	(United States) Extreme Speed Motorsports	(United States) Scott Sharp (United Kingdom) Ryan Dalziel (Australia) David Brabham	HPD ARX-03b	C	359	Mechanical
59 DNF	P	1	(United States) Extreme Speed Motorsports	(United States) Scott Sharp (United Kingdom) Ryan Dalziel (Australia) David Brabham	Honda HR28TT 2.8 L Turbo V6	C	359	Mechanical
60 DNF	GTLM	3	(United States) Corvette Racing	(Denmark) Jan Magnussen (Spain) Antonio García (Australia) Ryan Briscoe	Chevrolet Corvette C7.R	M	329	Overheating
60 DNF	GTLM	3	(United States) Corvette Racing	(Denmark) Jan Magnussen (Spain) Antonio García (Australia) Ryan Briscoe	Chevrolet LT5.5 5.5 L V8	M	329	Overheating
61 DNF	P	0	(United States) DeltaWing Racing Cars	(United Kingdom) Andy Meyrick (United Kingdom) Katherine Legge (United States) Alexander Rossi (Colombia) Gabby Chaves	DeltaWing DWC13	C	288	Mechanical
61 DNF	P	0	(United States) DeltaWing Racing Cars	(United Kingdom) Andy Meyrick (United Kingdom) Katherine Legge (United States) Alexander Rossi (Colombia) Gabby Chaves	Élan 1.9 L Turbo I4	C	288	Mechanical
62 DNF	P	78	(United States) Starworks Motorsport	(Venezuela) Alex Popow (Venezuela) E. J. Viso (Colombia) Sebastián Saavedra (United States) Scott Mayer (New Zealand) Brendon Hartley	Riley MkXXVI	C	238	Mechanical
62 DNF	P	78	(United States) Starworks Motorsport	(Venezuela) Alex Popow (Venezuela) E. J. Viso (Colombia) Sebastián Saavedra (United States) Scott Mayer (New Zealand) Brendon Hartley	Dinan-BMW 5.0 L V8	C	238	Mechanical
63 DNF	PC	09	(United States) RSR Racing	(Brazil) Bruno Junqueira (United States) Duncan Ende (United States) Gustavo Menezes (Denmark) David Heinemeier Hansson	Oreca FLM09	C	177	Collision damage
63 DNF	PC	09	(United States) RSR Racing	(Brazil) Bruno Junqueira (United States) Duncan Ende (United States) Gustavo Menezes (Denmark) David Heinemeier Hansson	Chevrolet 6.2 L V8	C	177	Collision damage
64 DNF	GTD	32	(United States) GMG Racing	(United States) Alex Welch (United States) James Sofronas (Germany) Frank Stippler (Germany) Marc Basseng	Audi R8 LMS	C	151	Crash
64 DNF	GTD	32	(United States) GMG Racing	(United States) Alex Welch (United States) James Sofronas (Germany) Frank Stippler (Germany) Marc Basseng	Audi 5.2 L V10	C	151	Crash
65 DNF	P	99	(United States) GAINSCO/Bob Stallings Racing	(United States) Alex Gurney (United States) Jon Fogarty (United States) Darren Law (United States) Memo Gidley	Chevrolet Corvette DP	C	92	Contact
65 DNF	P	99	(United States) GAINSCO/Bob Stallings Racing	(United States) Alex Gurney (United States) Jon Fogarty (United States) Darren Law (United States) Memo Gidley	Chevrolet LS9 5.5 L V8	C	92	Contact
66 DNF	GTLM	62	(United States) Risi Competizione	(Italy) Gianmaria Bruni (Italy) Giancarlo Fisichella (Italy) Matteo Malucelli (Monaco) Olivier Beretta	Ferrari 458 Italia GT2	M	88	Contact
66 DNF	GTLM	62	(United States) Risi Competizione	(Italy) Gianmaria Bruni (Italy) Giancarlo Fisichella (Italy) Matteo Malucelli (Monaco) Olivier Beretta	Ferrari 4.5 L V8	M	88	Contact
67 DNF	GTD	46	(United States) Fall-Line Motorsports	(United States) Charles Espenlaub (United States) Charlie Putnam (United Kingdom) James Walker (United Kingdom) Oliver Jarvis	Audi R8 LMS	C	5	Crash
67 DNF	GTD	46	(United States) Fall-Line Motorsports	(United States) Charles Espenlaub (United States) Charlie Putnam (United Kingdom) James Walker (United Kingdom) Oliver Jarvis	Audi 5.2 L V10	C	5	Crash

Tyre manufacturers
Key
Symbol	Tyre manufacturer
C	Continental
M	Michelin

United SportsCar Championship
Previous race: None	2014 season	Next race: 12 Hours of Sebring
