= Leonardo Maia =

Brazilian racing driver

Leonardo Maia (born December 4, 1980) is a Brazilian former racing driver.

Maia began racing professionally in the Barber Dodge Pro Series in 2001 and he won the series championship in 2003. In 2004, he moved to the Infiniti Pro Series (now Indy Lights) for Brian Stewart Racing and finished fifth in the championship with a pair of third place finishes. The following year, he made two Toyota Atlantic starts for Jensen MotorSport and he participated full-time in 2006 for Forsythe Championship Racing, finishing ninth in points with a best finish of fifth (twice). He retired from professional racing afterwards.

== Motorsports career results ==
=== American Open-Wheel racing results ===
(key) (Races in bold indicate pole position, races in italics indicate fastest race lap)

==== Barber Dodge Pro Series ====
Year	1	2	3	4	5	6	7	8	9	10	11	12	Rank	Points
2001	SEB	PIR	LRP1	LRP2	DET	CLE	TOR	CHI	MOH; 8	ROA; 8	VAN	LAG	**20th**	**16**
2002	SEB; 6	LRP; 15	LAG; 6	POR; 7	TOR; 17	CLE; 6	VAN; 17	MOH; 5	**ROA**; 1	MTL; 4			6th	87
2003	**STP**; 1	**MTY**; 2	MIL; 1	LAG; 4	**POR**; 1	**CLE**; 1	**TOR**; 9	**VAN**; 1	**MOH**; 1	MTL; 2			**1st**	**188**

==== Indy Lights ====
Year	Team	1	2	3	4	5	6	7	8	9	10	11	12	Rank	Points	Ref
2004	Brian Stewart Racing	HMS	PHX; 3	INDY; 6	KAN; Ret	NSH; Ret	MIL; Ret	MIS; 7	KTY; 3	PPIR; 7	CHI; 7	FON; 4	TXS; 12	**5th**	**292**	

==== Champ Car Atlantic ====
Year	Team	1	2	3	4	5	6	7	8	9	10	11	12	Rank	Points
2005	Jensen Motorsport	LBH	MTY	POR1	POR2	CLE1; 11	CLE2; 9	TOR	EDM	SJO	DEN	ROA	MTL	**16th**	**39**
2006	Forsythe	LBH; 9	HOU; 9	MTY; 10	POR; 9	CLE1; 7	**CLE2**; 6	TOR; 10	EDM; 17	SJO; 5	DEN; 12	MTL; 5	ROA; 12	**9th**	**161**

Sporting positions
Preceded by A. J. Allmendinger	Barber Dodge Pro Series Champion; 2003	Succeeded by Series folded
