= Memo Rojas =

Mexican racing driver

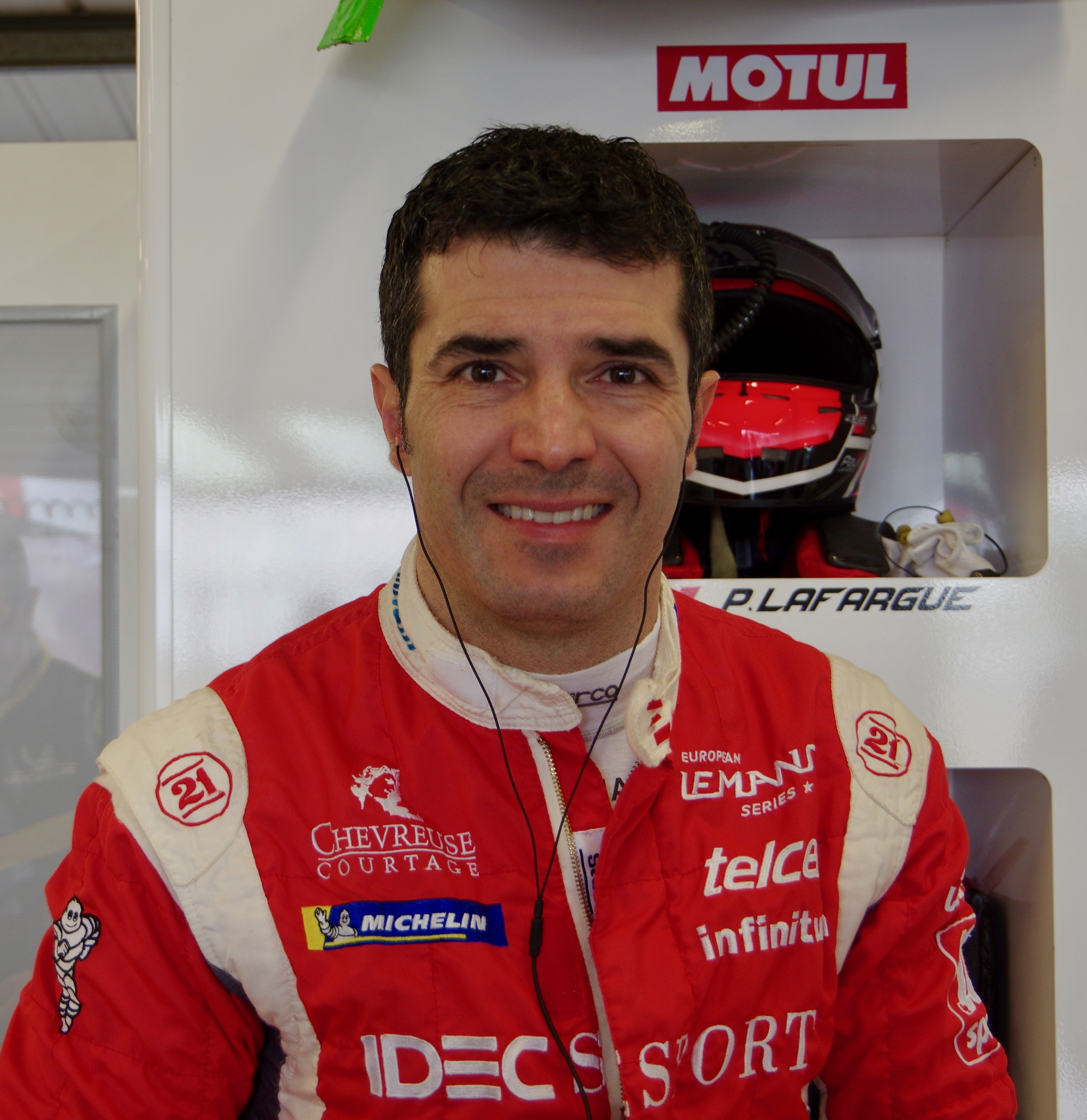
- Rojas in 2019
- Nationality: (Mexico) Mexican
- Born: Guillermo Miguel Ángel Rojas Jr. August 18, 1981 (age 45) Mexico City, Mexico
- Relatives: Memo Rojas Sr. (father)

United SportsCar Championship career
- Debut season: 2007 (as Grand-Am)
- Current team: DeltaWing
- Categorisation: FIA Gold (until 2022); FIA Silver (2023–)
- Car number: 0
- Starts: 91
- Wins: 28
- Poles: 8
- Best finish: 1st in 2008, 2010, 2011, 2012

Previous series
- 2004 2002–2003 2000–2001 1997–1998: Formula Renault; Barber Dodge Pro Series; Formula Ford 2000; Formula 3 Mexico

Championship titles
- 2017, 2019 2008, 2010, 2011, 2012: ELMS - LMP2; Rolex Sports Car Series

Guillermo Miguel Ángel "Memo" Rojas Jr. (born August 18, 1981) is a Mexican former professional race car driver. Successful in American sports car racing, Rojas is a four-time series champion in the Rolex Sports Car Series, a three-time winner of the 24 Hours of Daytona, and a two-time European Le Mans Series champion. He is the first Mexican driver to win a major American racing championship.

== Personal life ==
Rojas was born in 1981 in Mexico City, Mexico. He is son of the Mexican driver Guillermo Rojas, Sr.

== Career ==
=== Early career ===
Rojas began his racing career in 1993, racing karts; in 1996 he moved up to professional racing in the Mexican Formula Two series. Heading to the United States in 1997, he joined the Barber Dodge series, before returning to Mexico in 1998 to race for two years in the national Formula Three series.

Returning to the United States in 2000, Rojas spent two years racing in the American Formula Ford 2000 series, before moving up to the Barber Dodge Pro Series for the 2002 and 2003 seasons, claiming two wins during his time in the series, and finishing second in the series championship in 2003. He then graduated to the European Formula Renault series with DAMS in 2004, scoring two top-five finishes over the course of the year. In 2005, he returned to the United States, racing in the Toyota Atlantic championship series for a single race at the Fundidora park circuit in Monterrey.

=== Grand-Am ===
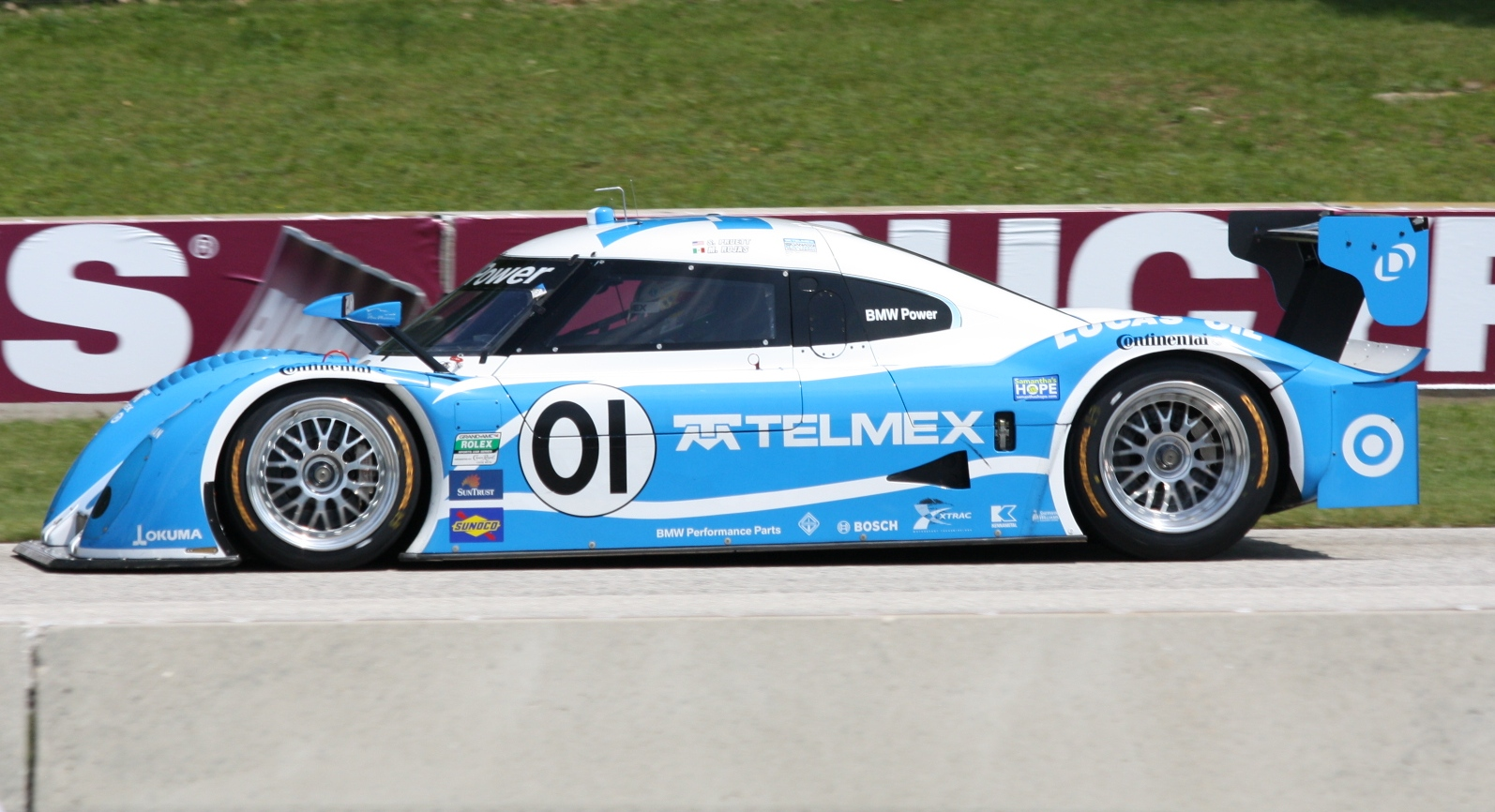
2011 Grand-Am Daytona Prototype with Scott Pruett

Switching from open-wheel racing to sports cars in 2007, Rojas joined Chip Ganassi Racing to compete in the Grand American Road Racing Rolex Sports Car Series, as a teammate to Scott Pruett. Claiming his first win in the series in 2007, Rojas won his first 24 Hours of Daytona endurance race the following year with co-drivers Pruett, Juan Pablo Montoya and Dario Franchitti. The victory propelled Rojas and Pruett to the Rolex Sports Car Series championship that year, setting a series record for the most victories in a season with six wins over the course of the year.

In 2009, Rojas would finish second in the Rolex Sports Car Series championship standings, only six points out of first place at the end of the year, before returning in 2010 to once again win the series championship partnered with Pruett. Over the course of the year Rojas set another series record for most victories in a season with nine, and finished on the podium eleven times in twelve races.

Rojas' 2011 season started with a co-victory, partnered with Pruett, Graham Rahal and Joey Hand, in the 24 Hours of Daytona, his second win in the event.

On the 51st edition of the 24 Hours of Daytona on January 26–27, 2013 Memo Rojas got the first place, winning his third 24 Hours of Daytona, along with his co-drivers Juan Pablo Montoya, Scott Pruett and Charlie Kimball.

=== 12 Hours of Sebring ===
On the 62nd edition of the 12 Hours of Sebring on March 15, 2014, Rojas, driving for the Telmex Ganassi Riley Mk XXVI-Ford EcoBoost DP team, won the second round of the new United SportsCar Championship by just under five seconds as nine cars in the Prototype class finished on the lead lap. Along with his co-drivers Scott Pruett and Marino Franchitti, Rojas become the first Mexican to achieve a victory in the 12 Hours of Sebring.

=== Retirement ===
After 31 years of professional career, on December 11, 2023, Rojas announced his retirement from motorsport.

== Racing record ==
=== Racing career summary ===
Season	Series	Team	Races	Wins	Poles	F/Laps	Podiums	Points	Position
1996	Formula Reynard México	N/A	?	?	?	?	?	?	4th
1997	Copa Corona Fórmula 3 Mexicana	Motorcraft, Dynamic Motorsports	8	1	0	2	3	87	**2nd**
1998	Copa Corona Fórmula 3 Mexicana	N/A	?	?	?	?	?	?	**3rd**
1999	Barber Dodge Pro Series	N/A	7	0	0	0	1	33	15th
2000	U.S. F2000 National Championship	N/A	13	0	0	0	2	158	6th
2001	U.S. F2000 National Championship	Roquin Motorsports	13	0	1	0	2	180	6th
2002	Barber Dodge Pro Series	N/A	10	0	0	1	3	95	5th
2003	Barber Dodge Pro Series	N/A	10	2	2	0	6	128	**2nd**
2004	Formula Renault V6 Eurocup	Telmex-DAMS	19	0	0	0	1	62	16th
2005	Atlantic Championship	Brooks Associates Racing	1	0	0	0	0	17	18th
2007	Grand American Rolex Series - DP	Target Chip Ganassi Racing	14	1	0	0	7	381	4th
2008	Grand American Rolex Series - DP	Chip Ganassi Racing	14	6	1	0	8	408	**1st**
2009	Grand American Rolex Series - DP	Chip Ganassi Racing	12	2	3	0	8	331	**2nd**
2010	Grand American Rolex Series - DP	Chip Ganassi Racing	12	9	4	0	11	372	**1st**
2011	Grand American Rolex Series - DP	Chip Ganassi Racing	12	5	0	0	10	385	**1st**
2012	Grand American Rolex Series - DP	Chip Ganassi Racing	13	2	0	0	8	379	**1st**
2013	Grand American Rolex Series - DP	Chip Ganassi Racing	12	2	1	0	7	326	**2nd**
2014	United Sports Car Championship - Prototype	Chip Ganassi Racing	11	3	0	0	6	285	6th
2015	United Sports Car Championship - Prototype	DeltaWing Racing Cars w/ Claro/TracFone	9	0	0	0	0	207	8th
2016	European Le Mans Series - LMP2	Greaves Motorsport	6	0	0	0	0	36	10th
2016	24 Hours of Le Mans - LMP2	Greaves Motorsport	1	0	0	0	0	N/A	6th
2016	IMSA SportsCar Championship - GTLM	Scuderia Corsa	1	0	0	0	0	29	24th
2017	European Le Mans Series - LMP2	G-Drive Racing	6	1	0	0	5	110	**1st**
2017	24 Hours of Le Mans - LMP2	G-Drive Racing	1	0	0	0	0	N/A	17th
2018	European Le Mans Series - LMP2	IDEC Sport	6	0	0	0	2	64	4th
2018	24 Hours of Le Mans - LMP2	IDEC Sport	1	0	0	0	0	N/A	DNF
2019	European Le Mans Series - LMP2	IDEC Sport	6	1	0	0	4	125	**1st**
2019	24 Hours of Le Mans - LMP2	IDEC Sport	1	0	0	0	0	N/A	5th
2020	European Le Mans Series - LMP2	DragonSpeed USA	3	0	0	0	0	5.5	23rd
2020	24 Hours of Le Mans - LMP2	DragonSpeed USA	1	0	0	0	0	N/A	DNF
2021	European Le Mans Series - LMP2	Duqueine Team	6	0	0	0	1	52	7th
2021	24 Hours of Le Mans - LMP2	Duqueine Team	1	0	0	0	0	N/A	9th
2022	European Le Mans Series - LMP2	Duqueine Team	6	0	0	0	0	20	14th
2022	24 Hours of Le Mans - LMP2	Duqueine Team	1	0	0	0	0	N/A	25th
2022	Formula Ford Mexico	N/A	3	0	1	0	2	0	NC†
2023	FIA World Endurance Championship - LMP2	Alpine Elf Team	7	0	0	0	0	23	18th
2023	24 Hours of Le Mans - LMP2	Alpine Elf Team	1	0	0	0	0	N/A	9th

^{†} As Rojas was a guest driver, he was ineligible to score points.

^{*} Season still in progress.

=== American Open-Wheel racing results ===
(key) (Races in bold indicate pole position, races in italics indicate fastest race lap)

==== Barber Dodge Pro Series ====
Barber Dodge Pro Series results
Year	1	2	3	4	5	6	7	8	9	10	11	12	Rank	Points	Ref
1998	SEB; 9	LRP; 24	DET; 23	WGI; 17	CLE; 29	GRA; 13	MOH	ROA	LS1; 20	ATL; 11	HMS	LS2; 17	**26th**	**15**	
1999	SEB; 11	NAZ; 6	LRP; 2	POR; 14	CLE; 16	ROA; 22	DET; 19	MOH	GRA	LS	HMS	WGI	**15th**	**33**	
2002	SEB; 14	LRP; 7	LAG; 2	POR; 4	TOR; 2	CLE; 9	VAN; 16	MOH; 10	ROA; 5	MTL; 2			**5th**	**87**	
2003	STP; 3	MTY; 3	MIL; 3	**LAG**; 2	POR; 14	CLE; 7	TOR; 1	VAN; 9	MOH; 6	**MTL**; 1			**2nd**	**128**	

==== Atlantic Championship ====
Atlantic Championship results
Year	Team	1	2	3	4	5	6	7	8	9	10	11	12	Rank	Points	Ref
2005	Brooks Associates Racing	LBH	MTY; 7	POR1	POR2	CLE1	CLE2	TOR	EDM	SJO	DEN	ROA	MTL	**18th**	**17**	

=== Rolex Sports Car Series (Grand-Am) ===
(key)

Rolex Sports Car Series results
Year	Team	1	2	3	4	5	6	7	8	9	10	11	12	13	14	Rank	Points	Ref
2007	TELMEX Chip Ganassi with Felix Sabates	R24; 21	MEX; 4	MIA; 3	VIR; 8	MRY; 2	S6H; 2	MID; 2	DAY; 6	IOW; 1	BAR; 5	MON; 5	WGI; 3	SON; 3	MIL; 9	4	381	
2008	Chip Ganassi with Felix Sabates	R24; 1	MIA; 1	MEX; 2	VIR; 1	MRY; 3	S6H; 1	MID; 8	DAY; 1	BAR; 1	MON; 5	WGI; 13	SON; 6	NJP; 9	MIL; 9	1	408	
2009	Chip Ganassi with Felix Sabates	R24; 2	VIR; **12**	NJP; 9	LAG; **2**	S6H; 1	LEX; 1	DAY; **7**	BAR; 2	WGI; 2	MON; 10	MIL; 3	MIA; 2			2	331	
2010	Chip Ganassi with Felix Sabates	R24; 2	MIA; 1	BAR; 1	VIR; 1	LIM; 26	S6H; 1	LEX; 1	DAY; 1	NJP; 2	WGI; 1	MON; 1	MIL; 1			1	372	
2011	Chip Ganassi with Felix Sabates	R24; 1	MIA; 1	BAR; 1	VIR; 2	LIM; 7	S6H; 2	ELK; 1	LAG; 2	NJP; 1	WGI; 2	MON; 5	LEX; 2			1	385	
2012	Chip Ganassi with Felix Sabates	R24; 6	BAR; 3	MIA; 2	NJP; 10	BEL; 3	LEX; 2	ELK; 1	S6H; 4	IMS; 2	WGI; 3	MON; 1	LAG; 6	LIM; 7		1	355	
2013	Chip Ganassi with Felix Sabates	R24; 1	TXS; 3	BAR; 4	ATL; 1	BEL; 12^{♯}	LEX; 11	S6H; 7	IMS; 2	ELK; 4	KNS; 2	LAG; 2	LIM; 3			2	326	

♯ Did not complete 30 minutes drive time. No driver's points awarded.

=== 24 Hours of Daytona ===
24 Hours of Daytona results
Year	Class	No	Team	Car	Co-drivers	Laps	Position	Class Pos.
2007	DP	02	(United States) Chip Ganassi Racing	Lexus Riley DP	(New Zealand) Scott Dixon (United Kingdom) Dan Wheldon	538	41 ^{DNF}	21 ^{DNF}
2008	DP	01	(United States) Chip Ganassi Racing	Lexus Riley DP	(United States) Scott Pruett (Colombia) Juan Pablo Montoya (Scotland) Dario Franchitti	695	1	1
2009	DP	01	(United States) Chip Ganassi Racing	Lexus Riley DP	(United States) Scott Pruett (Colombia) Juan Pablo Montoya	735	2	2
2010	DP	01	(United States) Chip Ganassi Racing	BMW Riley DP	(United States) Scott Pruett (United Kingdom) Justin Wilson (Italy) Max Papis	755	2	2
2011	DP	01	(United States) Chip Ganassi Racing	BMW Riley DP	(United States) Scott Pruett (United States) Graham Rahal (United States) Joey Hand	721	1	1
2012	DP	01	(United States) Chip Ganassi Racing	BMW Riley DP	(United States) Scott Pruett (United States) Graham Rahal (United States) Joey Hand	757	6	6
2013	DP	01	(United States) Chip Ganassi Racing	BMW Riley DP	(United States) Charlie Kimball (Colombia) Juan Pablo Montoya (United States) Scott Pruett	709	1	1
2014	P	01	(United States) Chip Ganassi Racing	Ford Riley DP	(United States) Scott Pruett (United States) Jamie McMurray (United States) Sage Karam	610	43 ^{DNF}	11 ^{DNF}
2015	P	0	(United States) Claro/TracFone DeltaWing Racing	DeltaWing DWC13	(United Kingdom) Katherine Legge (Colombia) Gabby Chaves (United Kingdom) Andy Meyrick	42	53 ^{DNF}	16 ^{DNF}

=== WeatherTech SportsCar Championship ===
(key)(Races in bold indicate pole position, Results are overall/class)

Year	Team	Class	Make	Engine	1	2	3	4	5	6	7	8	9	10	11	Rank	Points	Ref
2014	Chip Ganassi Racing	P	Ford EcoBoost Riley DP	Ford Ecoboost 3.5 L V6 Turbo	DAY; 11	SEB; 1	LBH; 1	LGA; 3	DET; 11	WGL; 8	MOS; 9	IMS; 2	ELK; 7	COA; 1	PET; 3	6th	285	
2015	DeltaWing Racing Cars w/ Claro/TracFone	P	DeltaWing DWC13	Élan (Mazda) 1.9 L I4 Turbo	DAY; 15	SEB; 12	LBH; 9	LGA; 8	DET	WGL; 8	MOS; 8	ELK; 6	COA; 7	PET; 8		8th	207	
2016	Scuderia Corsa	GTLM	Ferrari 488 GTE	Ferrari F154CB 3.9 L Turbo V8	DAY; 4	SEB	LBH	LGA	WGL	MOS	LIM	ELK	VIR	COA	PET	24th	29	

=== 12 Hours of Sebring ===
12 Hours of Sebring results
Year	Class	No	Team	Car	Co-drivers	Laps	Position	Class Pos.
2014	P	01	(United States) Chip Ganassi Racing	Ford Riley DP	(United States) Scott Pruett (Scotland) Marino Franchitti	291	1	1
2015	P	0	(United States) DeltaWing Racing Cars with Claro/TracFone	DeltaWing DWC13	(United Kingdom) Katherine Legge (United Kingdom) Andy Meyrick	60	41 ^{DNF}	12 ^{DNF}

=== 24 Hours of Le Mans results ===
Year	Team	Co-Drivers	Car	Class	Laps	Pos.	Class Pos.
2016	(United Kingdom) Greaves Motorsport	(France) Nathanaël Berthon (France) Julien Canal	Ligier JS P2-Nissan	LMP2	348	10th	6th
2017	(Russia) G-Drive Racing	(Japan) Ryō Hirakawa (Mexico) José Gutiérrez	Oreca 07-Gibson	LMP2	327	39th	17th
2018	(France) IDEC Sport	(France) Paul Lafargue (France) Paul-Loup Chatin	Oreca 07-Gibson	LMP2	312	DNF	DNF
2019	(France) IDEC Sport	(France) Paul Lafargue (France) Paul-Loup Chatin	Oreca 07-Gibson	LMP2	364	10th	5th
2020	(United States) DragonSpeed USA	(France) Timothé Buret (Colombia) Juan Pablo Montoya	Oreca 07-Gibson	LMP2	192	DNF	DNF
2021	(France) Duqueine Team	(France) Tristan Gommendy (Austria) René Binder	Oreca 07-Gibson	LMP2	357	14th	9th
2022	(France) Duqueine Team	(United Kingdom) Richard Bradley (France) Reshad de Gerus	Oreca 07-Gibson	LMP2	326	52nd	25th
2023	(France) Alpine Elf Team	(United Kingdom) Olli Caldwell (Brazil) André Negrão	Oreca 07-Gibson	LMP2	323	19th	9th

=== European Le Mans Series Results ===
Year	Entrant	Class	Chassis	Engine	1	2	3	4	5	6	Rank	Points
2016	Greaves Motorsport	LMP2	Ligier JS P2	Nissan VK45DE 4.5 L V8	SIL; 8	IMO; 8	RBR; 6	LEC; 6	SPA; 4	EST; Ret	10th	36
2017	G-Drive Racing	LMP2	Oreca 07	Gibson GK428 4.2 L V8	SIL; 2	MON; 1	**RBR**; 2	LEC; 2	SPA; 2	EST; 4	1st	110
2018	IDEC Sport	LMP2	Oreca 07	Gibson GK428 4.2 L V8	**LEC**; 7	MNZ; 3	**RBR**; 4	SIL; 3	SPA; 4‡	ALG; 6	4th	64
2019	IDEC Sport	LMP2	Oreca 07	Gibson GK428 4.2 L V8	LEC; 2	MNZ; 2	**CAT**; 5	SIL; 1	SPA; 5	ALG; 1	1st	105
2020	DragonSpeed USA	LMP2	Oreca 07	Gibson GK428 4.2 L V8	LEC; 8	SPA; 14	LEC; 10	MNZ	ALG		23rd	5.5
2021	Duqueine Team	LMP2	Oreca 07	Gibson GK428 4.2 L V8	CAT; 6	RBR; 9	LEC; 4	MNZ; 5	SPA; 2	ALG; Ret	7th	52
2022	Duqueine Team	LMP2	Oreca 07	Gibson GK428 4.2 L V8	LEC; 12	IMO; 6	MNZ; Ret	CAT; 6	SPA; 9	ALG; 9	14th	20

^{‡} Half points awarded as less than 75% of race distance was completed.

=== Complete FIA World Endurance Championship results ===
(key) (Races in bold indicate pole position) (Races in italics indicate fastest lap)

Year	Entrant	Class	Chassis	Engine	1	2	3	4	5	6	7	Rank	Points
2023	Alpine Elf Team	LMP2	Oreca 07	Gibson GK428 4.2 L V8	SEB; Ret	ALG; 10	SPA; 8	LMS; 7	MNZ; 8	FUJ; 11	BHR; 10	18th	23

^{*} Season still in progress.

Sporting positions
Preceded by Jon Fogarty; Alex Gurney	Grand-Am Daytona Prototype champion 2008; With: Scott Pruett	Succeeded by Jon Fogarty; Alex Gurney
Preceded by Jon Fogarty; Alex Gurney	Grand-Am Daytona Prototype champion 2010, 2011, 2012; With: Scott Pruett	Succeeded by Jordan Taylor; Max Angelelli
Preceded by Simon Dolan; Harry Tincknell; Giedo van der Garde	European Le Mans Series; LMP2 Champion; 2017; With: Léo Roussel	Succeeded by Andrea Pizzitola; Roman Rusinov
Preceded by Andrea Pizzitola; Roman Rusinov	European Le Mans Series; LMP2 Champion; 2019; With: Paul-Loup Chatin	Succeeded by Filipe Albuquerque; Phil Hanson
