= Javier González (racing driver) =

Mexican racing driver (born 1962)

Javier Gonzalez Caceres (Note: In this Spanish name, the first or paternal surname is Gonzalez and the second or maternal family name is Caceres.) (born September 6, 1962, in Mexico) is a professional racecar driver. He is best known internationally for his part-season drive in the Barber Dodge Pro Series season of 2002. He also enjoys sponsoring Mexican children..

== Complete motorsports results ==
=== American Open-Wheel racing results ===
(key) (Races in bold indicate pole position, races in italics indicate fastest race lap)

==== Barber Dodge Pro Series ====
Year	1	2	3	4	5	6	7	8	9	10	Rank	Points
2002	(United States); SEB; 12	(United States); LRP	(United States); LAG; 14	(United States); POR; 11	(Canada); TOR	(United States); CLE	(Canada); VAN	(United States); MOH; 16	(United States); ROA	(Canada); MTL; 7	**20th**	**20**
