= 2003 Atlantic Championship =

Motorsports championship

2003 Toyota Atlantic Championship season
- Toyota Atlantic Championship Presented by Yokohama

Season
- Races: 12
- Start date: March 23rd
- End date: September 28th

Awards
- Drivers' champion: (United States) A. J. Allmendinger

The 2003 Toyota Atlantic Championship season was contested over 12 rounds. In this one-make formula all drivers had to utilize Swift chassis and Toyota engines. 14 different teams and 24 different drivers competed. All drivers were able to score points. The Toyota Atlantic Championship Presented by Yokohama Drivers' Champion was A. J. Allmendinger driving for RuSPORT.

== Teams and drivers ==
Team	No	Drivers	Races
Rahal-Letterman Racing	1	(United States) Jon Fogarty	11–12
Rahal-Letterman Racing	24	(United States) Danica Patrick	All
Jensen MotorSport	2	(Canada) Eric Jensen	1–2, 4–12
Jensen MotorSport	8	(Canada) Philip Fayer	1–2, 5–6, 8–10, 12
RuSPORT	3	(United States) Aaron Justus	All
RuSPORT	4	(United States) A. J. Allmendinger	All
P-1 Racing	6	(United States) Tony Ave	3
P-1 Racing	16	(Canada) Stéphan Roy	2–10
Sierra Sierra Racing	7	(Brazil) Hoover Orsi	3
Sierra Sierra Racing	7	(United States) Kyle Krisiloff	8–12
Sierra Sierra Racing	28	(United Kingdom) Ryan Dalziel	All
Sierra Sierra Racing	67	(Canada) Marc de Vellis	1–2
Transnet Racing	9	(Venezuela) Alex Garcia	All
Brooks Associates Racing	12	(United States) Marc Breuers	9, 11–12
Cameron Motorsports	13	(United States) Kyle Krisiloff	1–2
Lynx Racing	17	(United States) Bryan Sellers	4–5, 7, 9
Lynx Racing	17	(Canada) Louis-Philippe Dumouilin	8, 10
Lynx Racing	19	(Canada) Michael Valiante	All
DSTP Motorsports	27	(United States) Joey Hand	All
Dorricott Racing	31	(United States) Kyle Krisiloff	3–7
Dorricott Racing	33	(Mexico) Luis Díaz	All
Polestar Racing Group	49	(United States) Dan Selznick	2, 9
Polestar Racing Group	84	(Canada) Jonathan Macri	All
Pacific Coast Motorsports	69	(United States) Alex Figge	All
Scuderia Fortia	86	(Mexico) Eduardo Figueroa	1
Scuderia Fortia	88	(France) Romain Dumas	1

== Schedule ==
Rd	Date	Race name	Track	Location
1	March 23	(Mexico) 2003 Atlantic Grand Prix of Monterrey	Fundidora Park	Monterrey, Mexico
2	April 13	(United States) 2003 Argent Mortgage Toyota Atlantic Race	Streets of Long Beach	Long Beach, California
3	June 1	(United States) 2003 Atlantic Milwaukee Race	Milwaukee Mile	West Allis, Wisconsin
4	June 15	(United States) 2003 Atlantic Monterey Race	Mazda Raceway Laguna Seca	Monterey, California
5	June 22	(United States) 2003 Atlantic Portland Race	Portland International Raceway	Portland, Oregon
6	July 6	(United States) 2003 Argent Mortgage Toyota Atlantic 100K	Cleveland Burke Lakefront Airport	Cleveland, Ohio
7	July 13	(Canada) 2003 Atlantic Toronto Race	Exhibition Place	Toronto, Ontario
8	August 3	(Canada) 2003 Grand Prix de Trois-Rivières	Circuit Trois-Rivières	Trois-Rivières, Quebec
9	August 17	(United States) 2003 Atlantic Mid-Ohio Race	Mid-Ohio Sports Car Course	Lexington, Ohio
10	August 23	(Canada) 2003 Atlantic Montréal Race	Circuit Gilles Villeneuve	Montreal, Quebec
11	August 31	(United States) 2003 Argent Mortgage Challenge	Streets of Denver	Denver, Colorado
12	September 28	(United States) 2003 Argent Mortgage Toyota Atlantic 100K	Bayfront Park Street Circuit	Miami, Florida

== Race results ==
Rd	Race name	Pole Position	Fastest Lap	Lead most laps	Race winner	
Rd	Race name	Pole Position	Fastest Lap	Lead most laps	Winning driver	Winning team
1	Fundidora Park	(Mexico) Luis Díaz	(Mexico) Luis Díaz	(Canada) Michael Valiante	(Canada) Michael Valiante	Lynx Racing
2	Streets of Long Beach	(United States) A. J. Allmendinger	(United States) A. J. Allmendinger	(United States) A. J. Allmendinger	(United States) A. J. Allmendinger	RuSPORT
3	Milwaukee Mile	(United Kingdom) Ryan Dalziel	(United States) Kyle Krisiloff	(United Kingdom) Ryan Dalziel	(United Kingdom) Ryan Dalziel	Sierra Sierra Racing
4	Mazda Raceway Laguna Seca	(United States) A. J. Allmendinger	(United States) A. J. Allmendinger	(United States) A. J. Allmendinger	(United States) A. J. Allmendinger	RuSPORT
5	Portland International Raceway	(United Kingdom) Ryan Dalziel	(United Kingdom) Ryan Dalziel	(United Kingdom) Ryan Dalziel	(United Kingdom) Ryan Dalziel	Sierra Sierra Racing
6	Cleveland Burke Lakefront Airport	(United States) A. J. Allmendinger	(United States) A. J. Allmendinger	(United States) A. J. Allmendinger	(United States) A. J. Allmendinger	RuSPORT
7	Exhibition Place	(United States) A. J. Allmendinger	(United States) A. J. Allmendinger	(United States) A. J. Allmendinger	(United States) A. J. Allmendinger	RuSPORT
8	Circuit Trois-Rivières	(United States) A. J. Allmendinger	(United States) A. J. Allmendinger	(United States) A. J. Allmendinger	(United States) A. J. Allmendinger	RuSPORT
9	Mid-Ohio Sports Car Course	(United States) A. J. Allmendinger	(Canada) Jonathan Macri	(Canada) Michael Valiante	(Canada) Michael Valiante	Lynx Racing
10	Circuit Gilles Villeneuve	(United States) A. J. Allmendinger	(United States) A. J. Allmendinger	(United States) A. J. Allmendinger	(United States) A. J. Allmendinger	RuSPORT
11	Streets of Denver	(United States) A. J. Allmendinger	(United States) A. J. Allmendinger	(Canada) Michael Valiante	(United States) A. J. Allmendinger	RuSPORT
12	Bayfront Park Street Circuit	(United States) A. J. Allmendinger	(United Kingdom) Ryan Dalziel	(Canada) Michael Valiante	(Canada) Michael Valiante	Lynx Racing

== Championship standings ==
Pos	Driver	MTY	LBH	MIL	LAG	POR	CLE	TOR	TRR	MOH	MTL	DEN	MIA	Pts
1	(United States) A. J. Allmendinger	8	**1***	3	**1***	4	**1***	**1***	**1***	**17**	**1***	**1**	**11**	201
2	(United Kingdom) Ryan Dalziel	4	15	**1***	2	**1***	3	5	2	2	2	3	3	175
3	(Canada) Michael Valiante	1*	4	11	DNS	3	4	4	3	1*	4	2*	1*	161
4	(Canada) Jonathan Macri	2	3	4	3	8	2	3	7	5	6	6	5	145
5	(United States) Aaron Justus	5	2	5	4	5	13	2	14	3	3	13	7	123
6	(United States) Danica Patrick	3	14	6	13	6	5	10	5	10	7	5	2	109
7	(United States) Joey Hand	15	7	9	10	2	10	6	4	4	5	9	6	108
8	(Mexico) Luis Díaz	**10**	6	13	6	9	11	9	6	7	11	8	9	88
9	(United States) Alex Figge	6	5	7	5	7	14	8	15	8	8	14	8	87
10	(United States) Kyle Krisiloff	DNS	9	2	7	12	7	14	13	9	9	7	12	77
11	(Venezuela) Alex Garcia	11	10	12	8	13	6	12	12	11	13	11	13	60
12	(Canada) Eric Jensen	12	11		9	14	8	13	11	13	14	12	10	49
13	(Canada) Stéphan Roy		8	8	12	11	12	11	8	16	10			48
14	(United States) Bryan Sellers				11	10		7		6				30
15	(United States) Jon Fogarty											4	4	24
16	(Canada) Philip Fayer	13	13			15	9		10	14	15		15	24
17	(United States) Marc Breuers									12		10	14	12
18	(Canada) Louis-Philippe Dumouilin								9		12			11
19	(Canada) Marc de Vellis	7	16											9
20	(France) Romain Dumas	9												7
21	(United States) Tony Ave			10										6
22	(United States) Dan Selznick		12							15				5
23	(Mexico) Eduardo Figueroa	14												2
24	(Brazil) Hoover Orsi			14										2
Pos	Driver	MTY	LBH	MIL	LAG	POR	CLE	TOR	TRR	MOH	MTL	DEN	MIA	Pts

Color	Result
Gold	Winner
Silver	2nd place
Bronze	3rd place
Green	4th & 5th place
Light Blue	6th–10th place
Dark Blue	Finished (Outside Top 10)
Purple	Did not finish
Red	Did not qualify (DNQ)
Brown	Withdrawn (Wth)
Black	Disqualified (DSQ)
White	Did Not Start (DNS)
White	Race abandoned (C)
Blank	Did not participate

**In-line notation**
**Bold**	Pole position
Italics	Ran fastest race lap
*	Led most laps
**(RY)**	Rookie of the Year
**(R)**	Rookie

== Complete Overview ==
first column of every race	10	= grid position

second column of every race	10	= race result

R17=retired, but classified NS=did not start

For every race the points were awarded: 20 points to the winner, 16 for runner-up, 14 for third place, 12 for fourth place, 10 for fifth place, 8 for sixth place, 6 seventh place, winding down to 1 point for 15th place. Lower placed drivers did not award points. Additional points were awarded to the fastest qualifier on Friday (1 point), the fastest qualifier on Saturday (1 point) and to the driver leading the most laps (1 point). Oval races only saw one qualifying.

Note:

Race 3 no additional point for the qualifying were awarded due to rain, starting lineup based on combined practice times.

Race 3, 4, 6, 7 and 11 not all points were awarded (not enough competitors).

Place	Name	Country	Team	(Mexico)		(United States)		(United States)		(United States)		(United States)		(United States)		(Canada)		(Canada)		(United States)		(Canada)		(United States)		(United States)
1	A. J. Allmendinger	United States	RuSPORT	3	8	1	1	3	3	1	1	2	4	1	1	1	1	1	1	1	R17	1	1	1	1	1	R11
2	Ryan Dalziel	United Kingdom	Sierra Sierra Racing	9	4	3	R15	1	1	3	2	1	1	4	3	4	5	3	2	3	2	3	2	5	3	2	3
3	Michael Valiante	Canada	Lynx Racing	4	1	6	4	8	11	9	NS	5	3	2	4	3	4	2	3	4	1	2	4	2	2	3	1
4	Jonathan Macri	Canada	Polestar Motor Racing	6	2	5	3	2	4	6	3	8	8	6	2	6	3	8	7	5	5	8	6	10	6	9	5
5	Aaron Justus	United States	RuSPORT	10	5	2	2	6	5	5	4	7	5	5	R13	2	2	5	14	2	3	4	3	10	R13	6	7
6	Danica Patrick	United States	Team Rahal	5	3	10	R14	7	6	10	R13	10	6	10	5	9	10	4	5	11	10	5	7	7	5	5	2
7	Joey Hand	United States	DSTP Motorsports	2	R15	15	7	13	9	4	R10	3	2	3	10	5	6	7	4	7	4	6	5	11	9	7	6
8	Luis Díaz	Mexico	Dorricott Racing	1	10	4	6	9	R13	7	6	4	9	14	R11	12	9	6	6	8	7	7	11	8	8	8	9
9	Alex Figge	United States	Pacific Coast Motorsports	8	6	7	5	10	7	2	5	6	7	7	R14	7	8	10	R15	9	8	10	8	6	R14	13	8
10	Kyle Krisiloff	United States	Cameron Motorsports	12	NS	12	9
10	Kyle Krisiloff	United States	Dorricott Racing					4	2	10	7	12	12	11	7	8	R14
10	Kyle Krisiloff	United States	Sierra Sierra Racing															11	13	10	9	9	9	9	7	11	R12
11	Alex García	Venezuela	Transnet Racing	13	11	11	10	14	12	11	8	14	13	8	6	13	12	13	12	13	11	12	13	13	11	12	R13
12	Eric Jensen	Canada	Jensen Motorsport	15	R12	13	11	-	-	13	9	13	14	12	8	14	13	14	11	15	13	14	14	14	12	15	10
13	Stéphan Roy	Canada	P-1 Racing	-	-	9	8	11	8	12	R12	11	11	9	R12	10	11	9	8	12	R	11	10	-	-	-	-
14	Bryan Sellers	United States	Lynx Racing	-	-	-	-	-	-	8	R11	9	10	-	-	11	7	-	-	6	6	-	-	-	-	-	-
15	Jon Fogarty	United States	Team Rahal	-	-	-	-	-	-	-	-	-	-	-	-	-	-	-	-	-	-	-	-	4	4	4	4
16	Philip Fayer	Canada	Jensen Motorsport	16	R13	16	13	-	-	-	-	15	R15	13	9	-	-	15	10	16	14	15	R15	-	-	14	R15
17	Marc Breuers	United States	Brooks Associates Racing	-	-	-	-	-	-	-	-	-	-	-	-	-	-	-	-	14	12	-	-	12	10	10	R14
18	Louis-Philippe Dumoulin	Canada	Lynx Racing	-	-	-	-	-	-	-	-	-	-	-	-	-	-	12	9	-	-	13	12	-	-	-	-
19	Marc de Vellis	Canada	Sierra Sierra Racing	7	7	8	R16	-	-	-	-	-	-	-	-	-	-	-	-	-	-	-	-	-	-	-	-
20	Romain Dumas	France	Scuderia Fortia	11	9	-	-	-	-	-	-	-	-	-	-	-	-	-	-	-	-	-	-	-	-	-	-
21	Tony Ave	United States	P-1 Racing	-	-	-	-	12	10	-	-	-	-	-	-	-	-	-	-	-	-	-	-	-	-	-	-
22	Dan Selznick	United States	Polestar Motor Racing	-	-	14	12	-	-	-	-	-	-	-	-	-	-	-	-	17	15	-	-	-	-	-	-
23	Eduardo Figueroa	Mexico	Scuderia Fortia	14	R14	-	-	-	-	-	-	-	-	-	-	-	-	-	-	-	-	-	-	-	-	-	-
	Hoover Orsi	Brazil	Sierra Sierra Racing	-	-	-	-	5	R14	-	-	-	-	-	-	-	-	-	-	-	-	-	-	-	-	-	-

== See also ==
- 2003 CART season
- 2003 Indianapolis 500
- 2003 IndyCar Series season
- 2003 Infiniti Pro Series season
