= Bryan Sellers =

American racing driver (born 1982)

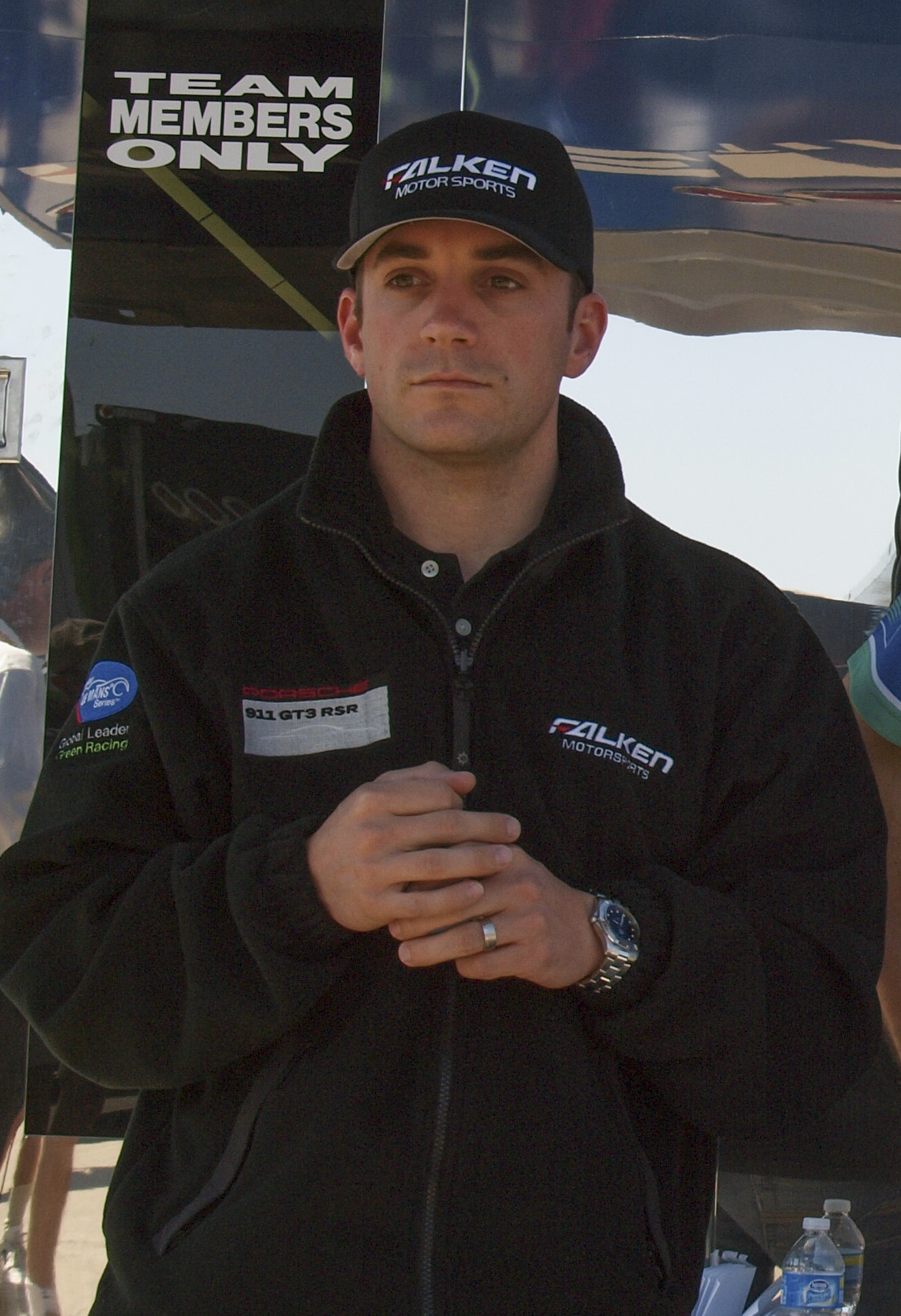
- Sellers at the 2010 12 Hours of Sebring.
- Nationality: (United States) American
- Born: August 19, 1982 (age 44) Dayton, Ohio, U.S.

WeatherTech SportsCar Championship career
- Debut season: 2014
- Current team: Paul Miller Racing
- Categorisation: FIA Gold
- Car number: 1
- Engine: BMW
- Former teams: Team Falken Tire
- Starts: 102
- Championships: 6
- Wins: 15
- Podiums: 41
- Poles: 3
- Best finish: 1st in 2018 (GTD), 2023 (GTD)

Previous series
- 2005–2013; 2005–2013; 2010–2013; 2003–2004; 2000–2002; 1999–2000: American Le Mans Series; Rolex Sports Car Series; Continental Tire Sports Car Challenge; Atlantic Championship; USF2000; Skip Barber Formula Dodge

Championship titles
- 2022 2023 2020 2018 2023 2002: IMSA WeatherTech Sprint Cup - GTD; IMSA Michelin Endurance Cup - GTD; IMSA SportsCar Championship – GTD; USF2000 Championship

Awards
- 2001: Team USA Scholarship

Bryan Sellers (born August 19, 1982 in Dayton, Ohio) is an American racing driver. Sellers won the title in the U.S. F2000 in 2002 and later competed in the Atlantic Championship and in racing sports cars.

== Racing career ==
Sellers first competed in the World Karting Association (WKA) Manufacturer's Cup and the Gold Cup in 1994, racing other young drivers such as Danica Patrick. In 1998, Sellers won the Spec 100 Open class in the Manufacturer's Cup, beating future Atlantic Championship rival Jonathan Macri.

Sellers made his first auto racing start in a Star Mazda in 1998, before competing in the Midwestern Skip Barber Formula Dodge. Sellers won the championship, beating other young hopefuls such as Caio Travaglini and Jason LaPoint. Sellers won his first two races at the Indianapolis Raceway Park road course, and ran races in the other Formula Dodge regions. At Lime Rock Park, Sellers beat Marc Breuers to win two races. In 2000, Sellers competed in the second edition of the Skip Barber National Championship; he won races at Grattan Raceway at the start of the season but lost the title to Canadian Anthony Simone. Due to his strong results in the Skip Barber ranks, Sellers advanced to the Barber Dodge Pro Series at Road America, supporting the Champ Car Grand Prix of Road America, and placed twelfth in his debut race.

For 2001, Sellers signed with DSTP Motorsports for a partial schedule in the U.S. F2000. After one race, the team switched from the Mygale chassis to the more favorable Van Diemen chassis. The best result for Sellers was a seventh place at Sebring International Raceway. Supported by Team USA Scholarship, Sellers and teammate A. J. Allmendinger competed for a number of races in the New Zealand Formula Ford Championship. Sellers and Allmendinger finished second and third in the prestigious New Zealand Grand Prix which was won by Fabian Coulthard. For the 2002 season, Sellers returned to the United States to race in the USF2000, joining the highly successful Cape Motorsports outfit. Sellers won the first race at Sebring and won another seven races to claim the championship. The following year, 2003, Sellers joined the Atlantic Championship with Lynx Racing. Running a partial schedule, Sellers scored three top-ten finishes out of four races. In 2004, Sellers competed in all races of the championship; he claimed three podium finishes: at Long Beach, Cleveland and Denver.

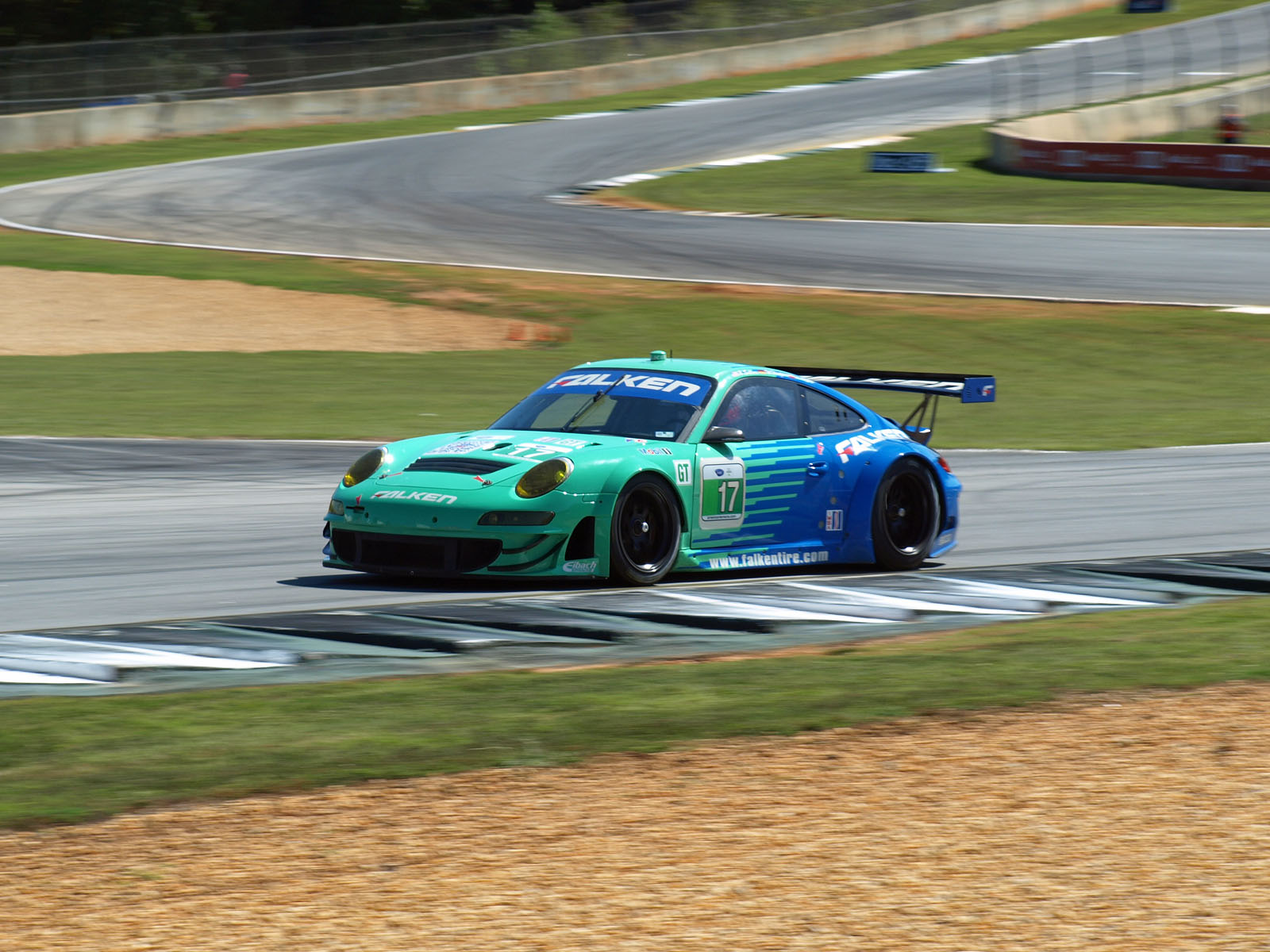
Sellers driving the Falken Tire Porsche at Road Atlanta in 2011.

Unable to continue in single seaters, Sellers shifted his focus to the American Le Mans Series and Grand-Am. Panoz Motorsports signed Sellers to drive their Panoz Esperante GTLM. The team had a tough season with a number of retirements. The best result for Sellers was a fifth place at the 2005 Portland Grand Prix with teammate Robin Liddell. For 2006 Sellers joined BMW Team PTG in of their BMW M3 GTR entries. Sellers and teammate Justin Marks finished 24th in the season standings. After running various races in 2007, Sellers joined the Rolex Sports Car Series for their 2008 season. Joining The Racer's Group, Sellers scored a third place in class at the 24 Hours of Daytona. Sellers was placed sixteenth in the series championship. After running three races in 2009 for Team Falken Tire, Sellers joined the team full-time in 2010 and scored numerous top-ten finishes in the American Le Mans Series. In 2011, Sellers scored two class wins in the GT class with teammate Wolf Henzler at Mid-Ohio and Baltimore. For 2012, Sellers remained at Team Falken Tire, run by Walker Racing. Sellers and Henzler again won their class at Baltimore. Sellers also ran in the Continental Tire Sports Car Challenge for Fall-Line Motorsports, placing tenth in the championship standings. In 2013, Sellers won Petit Le Mans in the GT class, the final ALMS event before being merged into the WeatherTech SportsCar Championship. Sellers repeated this performance in 2014. In 2015, Sellers won the 6 Hours of Watkins Glen.

In 2016, Sellers joined Paul Miller Racing, and teamed up with Madison Snow. In their sixth race as a duo, they earned their first joint podium. They went on to finish third in the championship that year, including a win at Virginia International Raceway. Year 2 was the only one to see them not get a win, and after a penalty resulting in loss of championship points, they finished ninth. Everything went right in 2018, with Bryan and Madison winning the GTD Championship, as well as the 2018 12 Hours of Sebring and the NorthEast Grand Prix at Lime Rock Park. The duo took nine podium finishes out of 12 races. They narrowly beat Katherine Legge in what remains the hardest fought GTD championship to date, requiring an average finish of third place. Sellers had two different co-drivers in 2019, sharing the Paul Miller Racing Lamborghini with Ryan Hardwick for the first half of the season before endurance driver Corey Lewis stepped in to contest the final five races of the season. Together with Lewis, Sellers won the Laguna Seca round. Madison came back into the picture for the 2020 season, and it kicked off with a bang! Together with Lewis and Andrea Caldarelli, Madison and Bryan claimed first place in GTD at the 2020 24 Hours of Daytona. Due to the COVID-19 pandemic, however, they were unable to complete the full season and instead participated in only select races. They did still win a championship. Lewis, Snow, and Sellers took the 2020 Michelin Endurance Cup, setting a record for points accrued that still hasn't been broken. In 2021, Sellers once again teamed up with Snow in the Lamborghini, and they had much success, taking their first win at the Long Beach Grand Prix. They stood on the podium seven out of 12 races, and came just short of winning their second full season championship.

2022 brought big change to the Paul Miller Racing organization, with the introduction of a new manufacturer. The team moved to BMW, becoming one of four M4 GT3s on the grid. Unfortunately, they did not receive their car until after the first race of the season, eliminating them from contention for the full season honors before their first race. They debuted the car at Sebring International Raceway and ran well until contact from a faster class car put them behind the wall for several hours. The defending race winners at Long Beach took pole and victory once again at the southern California event. Sellers and Snow would win a meaningful Lime Rock Park race once again as well, finishing out the season with top-five finishes at every race except Sebring and Watkins Glen, where they (along with many others) were disqualified. Their average finish in 2022 was the best of the field. 2023 saw Sellers once again sharing the car with Snow, tying Wolf Henzler for Sellers' longest driving partnership. The duo clinched the championship in record setting fashion, sealing it with still a race to go. They achieved victories at the 2023 12 Hours of Sebring, a third consecutive win at the Long Beach Grand Prix, their first wins at both Canadian Tire Motorsport Park and Road America, as well as win at the site of their first success in 2016, Virginia International Raceway. They also took home their second consecutive Sprint Cup.

== Personal life ==
Sellers is married to pit lane reporter Jamie Howe, and the couple have two children.

== Racing record ==
=== Career Summary ===
Season	Series	Team	Races	Wins	Poles	F/Laps	Podiums	Points	Position
2000	Barber Dodge Pro Series		1	0			0	4	26th
2000	U.S. F2000 National Championship	Archangel Motorsports						0	NC
2001	U.S. F2000 National Championship	DSTP Motorsports						42	18th
2002	U.S. F2000 National Championship	Cape Motorsports	11	0			0	327	**1st**
2003	Formula Atlantic	Lynx Racing	4	0			0	30	14th
2004	Formula Atlantic	Lynx Racing	14	8			10	227	6th
2005	American Le Mans Series - GT2	Panoz Motor Sports	10	0	0		0	36	19th
2006	American Le Mans Series - GT2	BMW Team PTG	9	0	0		0	37	24th
2007	American Le Mans Series - GT2	Panoz Team PTG	2	0	0	0	0	0	NC
2009	American Le Mans Series - GT2	Team Falken Tire	3	0	0	0	0	8	46th
2010	American Le Mans Series - GT2	Team Falken Tire	9	0	0		0	40	17th
2011	American Le Mans Series - GT	Team Falken Tire	9	2	0		2	97	5th
2012	American Le Mans Series - GT	Team Falken Tire	10	1	0		1	81	8th
2013	American Le Mans Series - GT	Team Falken Tire	10	1	0		3	55	10th
2014	United SportsCar Championship - GTLM	Team Falken Tire	10	1			2	266	12th
2015	United SportsCar Championship - GTLM	Team Falken Tire	10	1			2	268	7th
2016	IMSA SportsCar Championship - GTD	Paul Miller Racing	11	1			3	293	**3rd**
2017	IMSA SportsCar Championship - GTD	Paul Miller Racing	12	0			2	281	9th
2018	IMSA SportsCar Championship - GTD	Paul Miller Racing	11	2			8	333	**1st**
2019	IMSA SportsCar Championship - GTD	Paul Miller Racing	11	1			3	215	10th
2020	IMSA SportsCar Championship - GTD	Paul Miller Racing	5	1			2	126	18th
2021	IMSA SportsCar Championship - GTD	Paul Miller Racing	12	1			7	3163	**2nd**
2022	IMSA SportsCar Championship - GTD	Paul Miller Racing	11	2			5	2679	6th
2023	IMSA SportsCar Championship - GTD	Paul Miller Racing	11	5			7	3482	**1st**
2024	IMSA SportsCar Championship - GTD	Paul Miller Racing	10	1	1	1	3	2929	4th
2024	GT World Challenge America - Pro-Am	DXDT Racing	13	2	0	0	4	156	4th

=== American Open-Wheel racing results ===
(key)

==== Barber Dodge Pro Series ====
Year	1	2	3	4	5	6	7	8	9	10	11	12	Rank	Points
2000	SEB	MIA	NAZ	LRP	DET	CLE	MOH	ROA; 12	VAN	LS	RAT	HMS	**26th**	**4**

==== USF2000 National Championship ====
Year	Entrant	1	2	3	4	5	6	7	8	9	10	11	12	13	14	Pos	Points	Ref
2000	Archangel Motorsports	PIR	MOS1	MOS2	IRP1	ROA1	ROA1	TRR	MOS3	WGI1	WGI2	IRP2	ATL1; 24	ATL2; 13		**N.C.**	**N.C.**	
2001	DSTP Motorsports	HMS1; 17	HMS2; DNQ	HMS3; DNQ	WGI1; 20	WGI2; 14	IRP; DNQ	MOH1; 28	MOH2; 22	ROA1	ROA2	MOH3; 8	SEB1; 7	SEB2; 23		**18th**	**42**	
2002	Cape Motorsports	**SEB1**; 1	SEB2; 3	**MOS1**; 1	**MOS2**; 1	**IRP**; 9	MIL1; 6	MIL2; 12	MOH; 3	**MOH**; 1	MOH; 22	**ROA1**; 1	**ROA2**; 1	VIR1; 1	VIR2; 1	**1st**	**327**	

==== Atlantic Championship ====
Year	Team	1	2	3	4	5	6	7	8	9	10	11	12	Rank	Points	Ref
2003	Lynx Racing	MTY	LBH	MIL	LS; 11	POR; 10	CLE	TOR; 7	TRR	MOH; 6	MTL	DEN	MIA	**14th**	**30**	
2004	Lynx Racing	LBH; 3	MTY; 12	MIL; 5	POR1; 7	POR2; 5	CLE; 2	TOR; 5	VAN; 11	ROA; 6	DEN; 3	MTL; 6	LS; 10	**6th**	**227**	

=== American Le Mans Series results ===
(key) (Races in bold indicate pole position; results in italics indicate fastest lap)

Year	Team	Class	Make	Engine	1	2	3	4	5	6	7	8	9	10	11	12	Pos.	Points	Ref
2005	Panoz Motor Sports	GT2	Panoz Esperante GT-LM	Ford (Élan) 5.0L V8	SEB; 7	ATL; 9	MID; 8	LIM; 6	SON; DNF	POR; 4	AME; 7	MOS; 7	PET; 7	MON; 7			19th	36	
2006	BMW Team PTG	GT2	BMW M3	BMW 3.4L I6	SEB; DNF	HOU	MOH; 5	LRP; 4	UTA; 9	POR; 8	ELK; 6	MOS; DNF	PET; 9†	LAG; DNF			24th	37	
2007	Panoz Team PTG	GT2	Panoz Esperante GT-LM	Ford (Élan) 5.0L V8	SEB; 12	STP	LBH	HOU	UTA; DNF	LRP	MOH	ELK	MOS	DET	PET	LAG	NC	0	
2009	Team Falken Tire	GT2	Porsche 911 GT3 RSR	Porsche 4.0 L Flat-6	SEB	STP	LBH; DNF	UTA	LRP	MOH	ELK	MOS	PET; 11	LAG; 8			46th	8	
2010	Team Falken Tire	GT	Porsche 911 GT3 RSR	Porsche 4.0 L Flat-6	SEB; 12	LBH; 6	LAG; 7	UTA; 9	LRP; 8	MOH; 8	ELK; 10	MOS; 7	PET; 10				17th	40	
2011	Team Falken Tire	GT	Porsche 911 GT3 RSR	Porsche 4.0 L Flat-6	SEB; DNF	LBH; 4	LRP; 5	MOS; 5	MOH; 1	ELK; 6	BAL; 1	LAG; DNF	PET; 5				5th	97	
2012	Team Falken Tire	GT	Porsche 911 GT3 RSR	Porsche 4.0 L Flat-6	SEB; 8	LBH; 6	LAG; 7	LRP; 7	MOS; 4	MOH; 4	ELK; 12†	BAL; 1	VIR; 7	PET; 6			8th	81	
2013	Team Falken Tire	GT	Porsche 911 GT3 RSR	Porsche 4.0 L Flat-6	SEB; 3	LBH; 10	LAG; 2†	LRP; 8	MOS; 10	ELK; 9	BAL; DNF	COA; 7	VIR; 8	PET; 1			10th	55	

^{†} Did not finish the race but was classified as his car completed more than 70% of the overall winner's race distance.

^{†} Sellers car failed post-race technical inspection, forfeiting all championship points but still maintaining its finishing position in the race.

=== Complete IMSA SportsCar Championship results ===
(key) (Races in bold indicate pole position; results in italics indicate fastest lap)

Year	Team	Class	Make	Engine	1	2	3	4	5	6	7	8	9	10	11	12	Pos.	Points	Ref
2014	Team Falken Tire	GTLM	Porsche 911 RSR	Porsche 4.0 L Flat-6	DAY	SEB; 5	LBH; 8	LAG; 4	WGI; 9	MOS; 8	IMS; 9	ELK; 9	VIR; 2	COA; 8	PET; 1		12th	266	
2015	Team Falken Tire	GTLM	Porsche 911 RSR	Porsche 4.0 L Flat-6	DAY; 8	SEB; 3	LBH; 6	LGA; 8	WGL; 1	MOS; 8	ROA; 8	VIR; 7	COA; 4	PET; 7			7th	268	
2016	Paul Miller Racing	GTD	Lamborghini Huracán GT3	Lamborghini 5.2 L V10	DAY; 16	SEB; 6	LGA; 7	**DET**; 8	WGL; 12	MOS; 3	LIM; 4	ELK; 8	**VIR**; 1	COA; 2	PET; 4		3rd	293	
2017	Paul Miller Racing	GTD	Lamborghini Huracán GT3	Lamborghini 5.2 L V10	DAY; 7	SEB; 5	**LBH**; 16	COA; 4	DET; 3	WGL; 12	MOS; 8	**LIM**; 2	ELK; 6	VIR; 5	**LGA**; 7	PET; 7	9th	281	
2018	Paul Miller Racing	GTD	Lamborghini Huracán GT3	Lamborghini 5.2 L V10	DAY; 3	SEB; 1	MOH; 3	**DET**; 3	WGL; 3	MOS; 4	LIM; 1	ELK; 2	VIR; 6	LGA; 4	PET; 3		1st	333	
2019	Paul Miller Racing	GTD	Lamborghini Huracán GT3 Evo	Lamborghini 5.2 L V10	DAY; 15	SEB; 16	MOH; 3	DET; 5†	WGL; 14	MOS; DNS	LIM; 7	ELK; 2	VIR; 10	**LGA**; 1	**PET**; 6		10th	215	
2020	Paul Miller Racing	GTD	Lamborghini Huracán GT3 Evo	Lamborghini 5.2 L V10	DAY; 1	DAY	SEB	ELK	VIR; 14	ATL; 2	MOH	CLT	PET; 7	LGA	SEB; 13		18th	126	
2021	Paul Miller Racing	GTD	Lamborghini Huracán GT3 Evo	Lamborghini 5.2 L V10	DAY; 3	SEB; 11	MOH; 3	DET; 6	WGL; 2	**WGL**; 10	LIM; 2	ELK; 7	LGA; 2	**LBH**; 1	VIR; 2	**PET**; 7	2nd	3163	
2022	Paul Miller Racing	GTD	BMW M4 GT3	BMW S58B30T0 3.0 L Twin-Turbo I6	DAY	SEB; 16	**LBH**; 1	LGA; 4	**MOH**; 2	DET; 3	WGL; 13	MOS; 5	LIM; 1	ELK; 4	VIR; 3	PET; 5	6th	2679	
2023	Paul Miller Racing	GTD	BMW M4 GT3	BMW S58B30T0 3.0 L Twin-Turbo I6	DAY; 8	SEB; 1	LBH; 1	MON; 10	WGL; 2	MOS; 1	LIM; 8	**ELK**; **1**	**VIR**; **1**	**IMS**; **3**	PET; 18		1st	3482	
2024	Paul Miller Racing	GTD Pro	BMW M4 GT3	BMW S58B30T0 3.0 L Twin-Turbo I6	DAY; 3	SEB; 4	LGA; 7	DET; 5	WGL; 8	MOS; 8	ELK; 2	**VIR**; 1	IMS; 8	PET; 7			4th	2929	

^{*} Season still in progress.
