= 2001 Barber Dodge Pro Series =

2001 Barber Dodge Pro Series season

Seasons
- ← 2000 2002 →

The 2001 Barber Dodge Pro Series season was the sixteenth season of this racing series. The championship was decided in the final round. Nicolas Rondet won the championship over Sepp Koster and Matt Plumb. Rafael Sperafico won the Rookie of the Year title.

== Drivers ==
All driver use Dodge powered Michelin shod Reynard 98E chassis.

No.	Driver	Note
3	(Netherlands) Sepp Koster	
4	(United States) Matt Plumb	
8	(United States) Roger Yasukawa	
9	(Brazil) Alexandre Sperafico	
11	(United States) Jon Morley	"Big Scholarship" winner
12	(United States) Keith Dusko	
14	(United States) David Wieringa	
16	(United States) Davy Cook	
17	(Colombia) Giandomenico Brusatin	
18	(United States) Peter Boss	
19	(United States) Sara Senske	
20	(New Zealand) Daynom Templeman	
21	(Brazil) Rafael Sperafico	"Big Scholarship" winner
22	(United States) Jay Ricci	
23	(United States) Brian Rivera	
24	(France) Nicolas Rondet	
26	(United States) Rhonda Trammell	
27	(Japan) Akihira Okamoto	
28	(Peru) Juan Manuel Polar	
31	(United States) Ryan Hunter-Reay	2000 Barber Dodge Pro Series Rookie of the Year
32	(United States) John Hall	
33	(United States) Jon Vannini	
66	(United States) Tom Fogarty	
94	(United States) Marc Breuers	
	(United States) Christian Szymczak	
	(Brazil) Rene Bauer	
	(Mexico) German Quiroga	
	(Netherlands) Ron van Toren	

== Race calendar and results ==
Round	Circuit	Location	Date	Pole position	Fastest lap	Winning driver	Headline event
1	Sebring International Raceway	(United States) Sebring, Florida	March 17	(Brazil) Alexandre Sperafico	(Brazil) Alexandre Sperafico	(Brazil) Alexandre Sperafico	12 Hours of Sebring
2	Phoenix International Raceway	(United States) Phoenix, Arizona	April 21	(France) Nicolas Rondet	(France) Nicolas Rondet	(France) Nicolas Rondet	Rolex Sports Car Series
3	Lime Rock Park	(United States) Lime Rock, Connecticut	May 26	(Netherlands) Sepp Koster	(United States) Ryan Hunter-Reay	(United States) Ryan Hunter-Reay	Lime Rock Grand Prix
4	Lime Rock Park	(United States) Lime Rock, Connecticut	May 28	(United States) Davy Cook	(France) Nicolas Rondet	(Netherlands) Sepp Koster	Lime Rock Grand Prix
5	Raceway at Belle Isle Park	(United States) Detroit, Michigan	June 17	(United States) Matt Plumb	(United States) Matt Plumb	(United States) Matt Plumb	Grand Prix of Detroit
6	Cleveland Burke Lakefront Airport	(United States) Cleveland, Ohio	June 30	(Netherlands) Sepp Koster	(Netherlands) Sepp Koster	(Netherlands) Sepp Koster	Grand Prix of Cleveland
7	Toronto Street Circuit	(Canada) Toronto	July 15	(United States) Matt Plumb	(United States) Matt Plumb	(United States) Ryan Hunter-Reay	Molson Indy Toronto
8	Chicago Motor Speedway	(United States) Cicero, Illinois	July 28	(France) Nicolas Rondet	(Netherlands) Sepp Koster	(France) Nicolas Rondet	Target Grand Prix
9	Mid-Ohio Sports Car Course	(United States) Lexington, Ohio	August 12	(United States) Matt Plumb	(Netherlands) Sepp Koster	(France) Nicolas Rondet	Miller Lite 250
10	Road America	(United States) Elkhart Lake, Wisconsin	August 19	(Netherlands) Sepp Koster	(France) Nicolas Rondet	(Netherlands) Sepp Koster	Motorola 220
11	BC Place	(Canada) Vancouver	September 1	(France) Nicolas Rondet	(Netherlands) Sepp Koster	(United States) Roger Yasukawa	Molson Indy Vancouver
12	Mazda Raceway Laguna Seca	(United States) Monterey County, California	October 13	(United States) Matt Plumb	(United States) Tim Traver	(United States) Matt Plumb	Grand Prix of Monterey

== Final standings ==
Color	Result
Gold	Winner
Silver	2nd place
Bronze	3rd place
Green	4th & 5th place
Light Blue	6th–10th place
Dark Blue	11th place or lower
Purple	Did not finish
Red	Did not qualify (DNQ)
Brown	Withdrawn (Wth)
Black	Disqualified (DSQ)
White	Did not start (DNS)
Blank	Did not participate (DNP)
Blank	Driver replacement (Rpl)
Blank	Injured (Inj)
Blank	No race held (NH)

Rank	Driver	(United States) SEB	(United States) PIR	(United States) LRP1	(United States) LRP2	(United States) DET	(United States) CLE	(Canada) TOR	(United States) CHI	(United States) MOH	(United States) ROA	(Canada) VAN	(United States) LAG	Points
1	(France) Nicolas Rondet	3	1	10	5	5	7	5	1	1	3	2	4	155
2	(Netherlands) Sepp Koster	22	2	18^{1}	1	16	1	2	6	3	1	4	2	151
3	(United States) Matt Plumb	20	21	2	6	1	2	3	5	2	6	5	1	151
4	(United States) Roger Yasukawa	4	7	3	10	2	6	4	8	5	2	1		128
5	(United States) Ryan Hunter-Reay	2	9	1	2	15	19	1	20	4	9	3	18	114
6	(United States) Marc Breuers	9	6	9	9	7	3	6	13	7	11	16	6	91
7	(Brazil) Rafael Sperafico	6	3	4	7	14	16	18	10	12	12	8	3	84
8	(United States) Jon Morley	7	4	7	19	17	4	14	3	11	10	12	8	81
9	(United States) Davy Cook	8	5	20	4	19	10	7	7	20	4	17	5	79
10	(Japan) Akihira Okamoto	10	12	8	8	4	11	20	9	9	18	9	10	70
11	(United States) Christian Szymczak	11	8	13	18	18	5	16	14	6	5	10	7	65
12	(Brazil) Alexandre Sperafico	1	13	11	3	3	17	15	19	21	23			58
13	(United States) Peter Boss	5	10	5	14	6	8	8	12					58
14	(United States) Sara Senske	12	15	6	11	9	18	12	2	10	19	13	14	58
15	(United States) David Wieringa	21	17	12	13	11	9	17	4	16	21	11	9	43
16	(United States) Tom Fogarty							10	15	13	20	7	12	23
17	(Brazil) Rene Bauer	23	20	19	20	8	15	9	11	18	16	15		22
18	(United States) A. J. Allmendinger									22	7	6		19
19	(United States) Jon Vannini	13	14	16	16	20	14	13	17	15	15	14	11	19
20	(Brazil) Leonardo Maia									8	8			16
21	(United States) Jay Ricci	16	19			12	12		18	19	13		13	14
22	(Colombia) Giandomenico Brusatin	14	11			10								13
23	(United States) Rhonda Trammel	15	16	15	15	13	13	19	16	17	17	18	17	9
24	(Canada) Daniel Di Leo							11						5
25	(United States) Brian Rivera			17	12									4
26	(United States) Keith Dusko	17	18	14	17									2
27	(United States) Ricardo Imery										14			2
28	(United States) Tophie Stewart									14				2
29	(United Kingdom) Brian Johnson												15	1
30	(United States) John Hall	18												0
31	(Peru) Juan Manuel Polar	19												0
32	(United States) Tim Traver										22		16	0

=== Notes ===
^1 Sepp Koster exceeded track limits after he had puncture. As he broke the rules by exceeding track limits he was classified in last place.
