= Michael Valiante =

Canadian racing driver

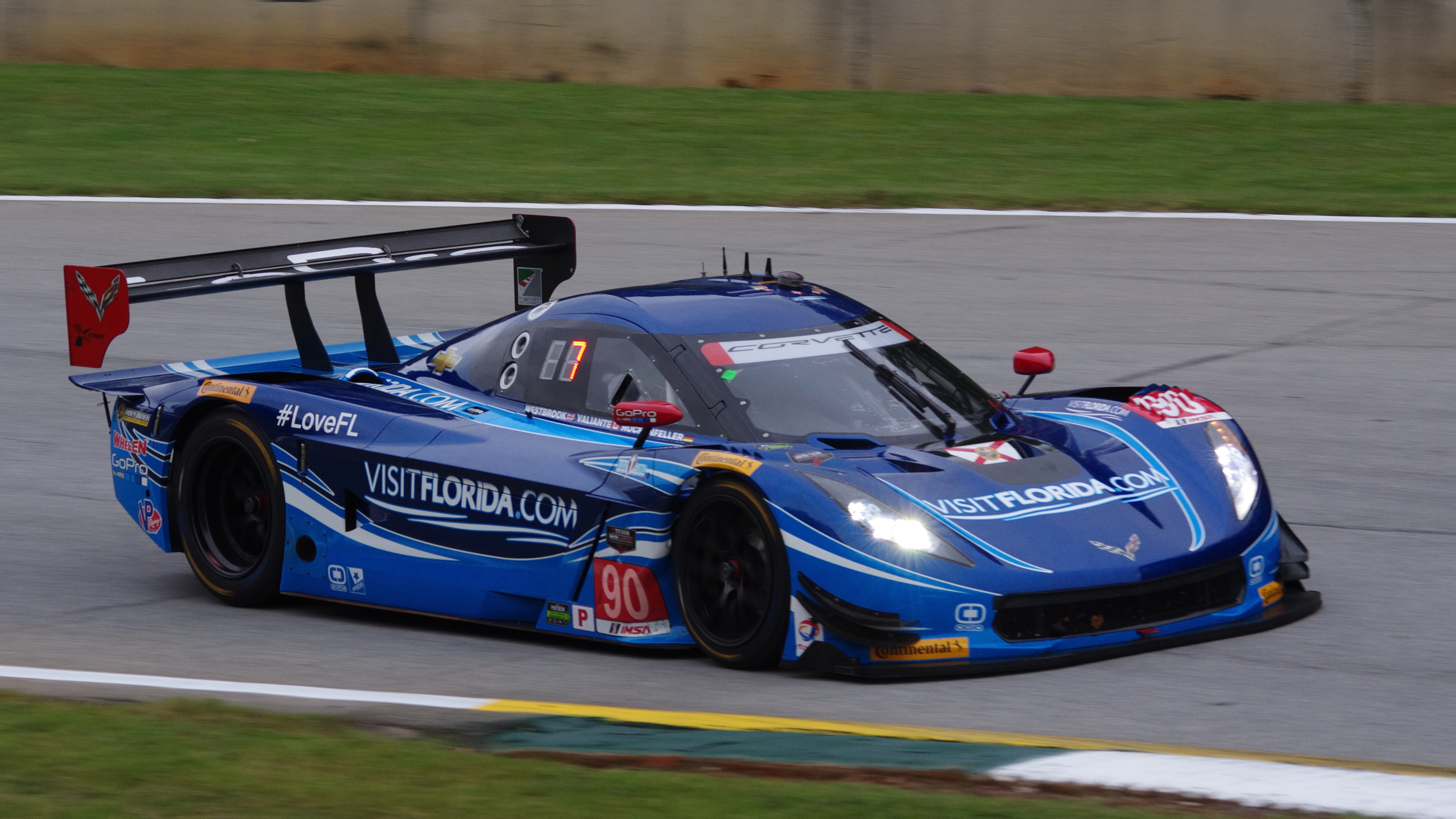
- Valiante at the 2015 Petit Le Mans driving a Corvette Daytona Prototype
- Nationality: (Canada) Canadian
- Born: 11 November 1979 (age 47) New Westminster, British Columbia, Canada
- Categorisation: FIA Gold (until 2019); FIA Silver (2022–)

Champ Car career
- 2 races run over 2 years
- Best finish: 23rd (2004)
- First race: 2004 Gran Premio Telmex/Tecate (Mexico City)
- Last race: 2005 G.I. Joe's Champ Car Grand Prix of Portland (Portland)
Wins	Podiums	Poles
0	0	0

NASCAR O'Reilly Auto Parts Series career
- 1 race run over 1 year
- Best finish: 140th (2007)
- First race: 2007 NAPA Auto Parts 200 (Montreal)
Wins	Top tens	Poles
0	0	0

Michael Valiante (born November 11, 1979, in New Westminster, British Columbia) is a Canadian racing driver.

== Formula racing ==
Valiante began racing in karting where his success earned him a full-season scholarship in the Skip Barber 2.0 Series. In his first season, Valiante was both series champion and rookie of the year. Following this success he moved on the Barber Dodge Pro Series and then to the Toyota Atlantic Championship.

Driving for the Lynx Racing team in 2001, Valiante was able to finish eighth in the series championship despite competing in only five events. His performance impressed Lynx enough to sign him for two more seasons. 2002 was Valiante's best year in the series. He won three races and led the points going into the final round in Denver, only to struggle in the race and lose the championship to Jon Fogarty. Valiante led the series early in 2003. However, his championship hopes were dashed when he missed the fourth round at Mazda Raceway Laguna Seca due to an illness. He went on to finish third in the championship and again scored three victories.

Valiante was set to make his debut in Champ Car at California Speedway in 2003, but the race was cancelled due to wildfires in the area. It was not until a year later that he made his first Champ Car start in Mexico City. His second start came at Portland in 2005 as a one-off drive for Dale Coyne Racing. He was not able to secure a full-time ride in the series due to his lack of financial backing.

== Sports car racing ==
In 2006, Valiante competed full-time with Finlay motorsports in the Grand-Am Rolex Sports Car Series, where he and co-driver Rob Finlay finished ninth in the final standings. In 2008 he switched to SunTrust Racing to partner Max Angelelli in a DP class Dallara Pontiac, winning at Sonoma.

Valiante joined Michael Shank Racing for the 2009 Rolex Sports Car Series. Driving a Riley Ford with John Pew as co-driver, he collected two podiums and resulted seventh in the DP drivers standings. In 2010 he partnered Brian Frisselle at the Shank team. With a best result of third, he finished ninth in the standings.

In 2012, Valiante alternated between the Rolex Sports Car Series and American Le Mans Series. He started five Rolex races, winning at Mid-Ohio with teammate Richard Westbrook. In ALMS he competed in five rounds with JDX Racing in the GTC class, collecting three third-place finishes.

Valiante returned to Michael Shank Racing for the 2013 Rolex Sports Car Series, having John Pew has teammate during most races. He collected two second-place finishes and resulted 15th in the DP standings.

In 2014, Valiante moved to Spirit of Daytona to race at the merged United SportsCar Championship. in the Spirit of Daytona Corvette Daytona Prototype with Richard Westbrook and Mike Rockenfeller.

== Stock car racing ==
In 2007, Valiante made a NASCAR Busch Series start driving the No. 42 Dodge from Chip Ganassi Racing at Circuit Gilles Villeneuve. Valiante started 21st and finished 34th.

== Motorsports career results ==
=== Complete American open-wheel racing results ===
(key) (Races in bold indicate pole position) (Races in italics indicate fastest lap)

==== Barber Dodge Pro Series ====
Year	1	2	3	4	5	6	7	8	9	10	11	12	Rank	Points
1999	SEB; 3	NAZ; 15	LRP; 8	POR; 22	CLE; 2	ROA	DET; 18	MOH; 4	GRA; 5	LS; 19	HMS; 7	WGI; 8	**10th**	**79**
2000	**SEB**; 2	MIA; 11	NAZ; 4	LRP; 18	DET; 26	CLE; 10	MOH; 9	ROA; 7	VAN; 17	LS; 6	**RAT**; 1	HMS; 6	**6th**	**97**

==== Atlantic Championship ====
Year	Team	1	2	3	4	5	6	7	8	9	10	11	12	Rank	Points
2001	Lynx Racing	LBH; 4	NAZ	MIL	MTL; 2	CLE	TOR; 6	CHI	TRR; 4	ROA	VAN; 2	HOU	LS	**9th**	**64**
2002	Lynx Racing	MTY; 4	LBH; 1	MIL; 7	LS; 5	POR; 9	CHI; 3	TOR; 1	CLE; 4	**TRR**; 1	ROA; 4	MTL; 7	DEN; 12	**2nd**	**150**
2003	Lynx Racing	MTY; 1	LBH; 4	MIL; 11	LS; Wth	POR; 3	CLE; 4	TOR; 4	TRR; 3	MOH; 1	MTL; 4	DEN; 2	MIA; 1	**3rd**	**161**

==== Champ Car World Series ====
Year	Team	No.	Chassis	Engine	1	2	3	4	5	6	7	8	9	10	11	12	13	14	Rank	Points	Ref
2004	Walker Racing	15	Reynard 02i	Ford XFE V8t	LBH	MTY	MIL	POR	CLE	TOR	VAN	ROA	DEN	MTL	LS	LVS	SRF	MXC; 14	**23rd**	**7**	
2005	Dale Coyne Racing	19	Lola B02/00	Ford XFE V8t	LBH	MTY	MIL	POR; 11	CLE	TOR	EDM	SJO	DEN	MTL	LVS	SRF	MXC		**25th**	**10**	

=== NASCAR ===
(key) (Bold – Pole position awarded by qualifying time. Italics – Pole position earned by points standings or practice time. * – Most laps led.)

==== Busch Series ====
NASCAR Xfinity Series results
Year	Team	No.	Make	1	2	3	4	5	6	7	8	9	10	11	12	13	14	15	16	17	18	19	20	21	22	23	24	25	26	27	28	29	30	31	32	33	34	35	NBSC	Pts	Ref
2007	Chip Ganassi Racing	42	Dodge	DAY	CAL	MXC	LVS	ATL	BRI	NSH	TEX	PHO	TAL	RCH	DAR	CLT	DOV	NSH	KEN	MLW	NHA	DAY	CHI	GTY	IRP	CGV; 34	GLN	MCH	BRI	CAL	RCH	DOV	KAN	CLT	MEM	TEX	PHO	HOM	140th	61	

=== 24 Hours of Daytona results ===
Year	Team	Co-drivers	Car	Class	Laps	Pos.	Class Pos.
2005	(United States) Ten Motorsports	(United States) Memo Gidley (United States) Michael McDowell (United States) Jonathan Bomarito	Riley Mk. XI-BMW	DP	465	42nd DNF	19th DNF
2006	(United States) Finlay Motorsports	(United States) Rob Finlay (United States) Bryan Herta (United States) Buddy Rice	Crawford DP03-Ford	DP	684	11th	9th
2007	(United States) Finlay Motorsports	(United States) Rob Finlay (United States) Bobby Labonte (United States) Michael McDowell	Crawford DP03-Ford	DP	627	10th DNF	10th DNF
2008	(United States) SunTrust Racing	(South Africa) Wayne Taylor (United States) Ricky Taylor (Italy) Max Angelelli	Riley Mk. XI-Pontiac	DP	687	5th	5th
2009	(United States) Michael Shank Racing	(United Kingdom) Ian James (United States) A. J. Allmendinger (United States) John Pew	Riley Mk. XX-Ford	DP	153	47th DNF	19th DNF
2010	(United States) Michael Shank Racing	(United States) A. J. Allmendinger (United States) Brian Frisselle (United States) Mark Patterson	Riley Mk. XI-Ford	DP	707	7th DNF	7th DNF
2011	(United States) Michael Shank Racing	(United States) John Pew (Brazil) Oswaldo Negri (Belgium) Marc Goossens	Riley Mk. XX-Ford	DP	706	10th	10th
2012	(United States) Starworks Motorsport	(United States) Marco Andretti (United States) Ryan Hunter-Reay (United States) Scott Mayer	Riley Mk. XX-Ford	DP	736	10th	10th
2013	(United States) Michael Shank Racing	(Canada) Chris Cumming (Venezuela) Jorge Goncalvez (Colombia) Gustavo Yacamán	Riley Mk. XXVI-Ford	DP	508	41st DNF	13th DNF
2014	(United States) Spirit of Daytona Racing	(United Kingdom) Richard Westbrook (Germany) Mike Rockenfeller	Coyote Corvette DP	P	693	4th	4th
2015	(United States) VisitFlorida.com Racing	(United Kingdom) Richard Westbrook (Germany) Mike Rockenfeller	Coyote Corvette DP	P	734	**3rd**	**3rd**

=== Complete IMSA SportsCar Championship results ===
(key) (Races in bold indicate pole position, Results are overall/class)

Year	Team	Class	Make	Engine	1	2	3	4	5	6	7	8	9	10	11	Rank	Points
2014	Spirit of Daytona Racing	P	Coyote Corvette DP	Chevrolet 5.5L V8	DAY; 4	SEB; 10	LBH; 5	LGA; 5	**DET**; 2	WGL; 1	MOS; 2	IMS; 3	ELK; 4	COA; 6	PET; 7	3rd	318
2015	VisitFlorida.com Racing	P	Coyote Corvette DP	Chevrolet 5.5L V8	DAY; 3	SEB; 3	LBH; 3	LGA; 1	DET; 5	WGL; 1	MOS; 4	ELK; 5	COA; 3	**PET**; 5		2nd	306

== See also ==
List of Canadians in Champ Car
