= 2015 Petit Le Mans =

Sportscar endurance race in Georgia, US

The Track map of Road Atlanta

The 18th Annual petit Le Mans presented by Mazda was the 2015 version of the Petit Le Mans automotive endurance race, was held on October 1–3, 2015 at the Road Atlanta circuit in Braselton, Georgia. This was the second Petit Le Mans in the United SportsCar Championship. The race was won overall by Richard Lietz, Patrick Pilet, and Nick Tandy in the #911 Porsche North America Porsche 911 RSR. Originally scheduled to run for 10 hours, the race was concluded after 8 hours (199 laps) were completed due to heavy rain, darkness, visibility, and hydroplaning. This marked the first time in the event's history that a GT car won overall.

== Background ==
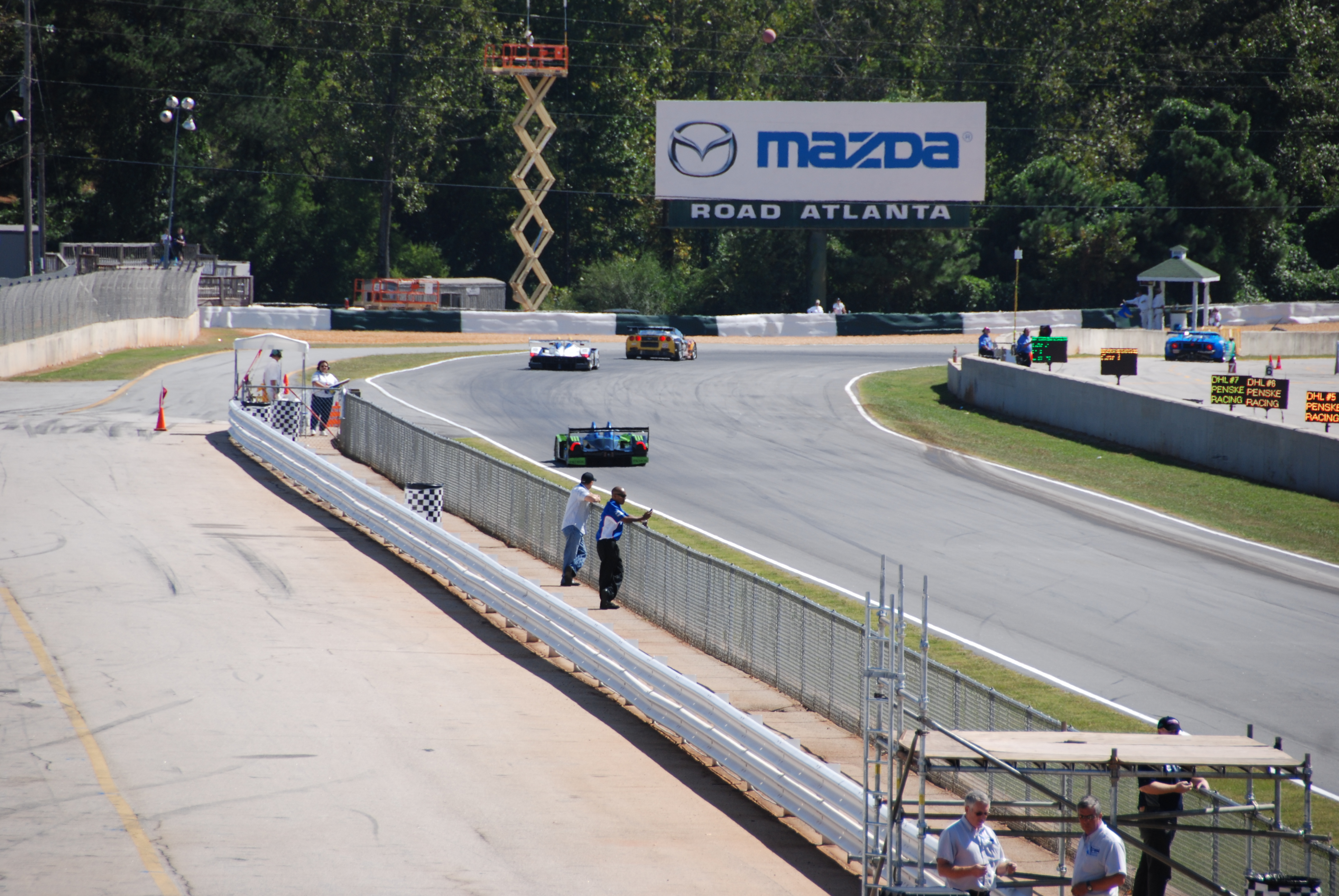
Michelin Raceway Road Atlanta, where the race was held.

=== Preview ===
International Motor Sports Association (IMSA) president Scott Atherton confirmed the race was part of the schedule for the 2015 IMSA Tudor United SportsCar Championship (IMSA TUSC) in August 2014. It was the second consecutive year the event was held as part of the Tudor United SportsCar Championship, and the 19th Petit Le Mans. The 2015 Petit Le Mans was the twelfth of twelve scheduled sports car races of 2015 by IMSA, and was the fourth round of the Patron North American Endurance Cup. The race was held at the twelve-turn, 2.540-mile (4.088 km) Road Atlanta in Braselton, Georgia on October 3, 2015.

=== Entry list ===
The official entry list consisted of 37 cars, including 9 in prototype, 8 in prototype challenge, 8 in GTLM and 12 in GTD.

== Practice ==
There were four practice sessions preceding the start of the race on Saturday, three on Thursday and one on Friday. The first two one-hour sessions were on Thursday morning and afternoon. The third held later that evening ran for 90 minutes; the fourth on Friday morning lasted an hour.

=== Practice 1 ===
The first practice session took place at 11:10 am ET on Thursday and ended with Oswaldo Negri Jr. topping the charts for Michael Shank Racing with Curb/Agajanian, with a lap time of 1:15.163.

Pos.	Class	No.	Team	Driver	Time	Gap
1	P	60	Michael Shank Racing with Curb/Agajanian	Oswaldo Negri Jr.	1:15.163	_
2	P	01	Chip Ganassi Racing	Scott Pruett	1:15.627	+0.464
3	P	0	DeltaWing Racing Cars with Claro/TracFone	Katherine Legge	1:15.757	+0.594

=== Practice 2 ===
The second practice session took place at 3:35 pm ET on Thursday and ended with Joey Hand topping the charts for Chip Ganassi Racing, with a lap time of 1:16.937.

Pos.	Class	No.	Team	Time	Gap
1	P	01	Chip Ganassi Racing	1:16.937	_
2	P	0	DeltaWing Racing Cars with Claro/TracFone	1:17.155	+0.218
3	P	31	Action Express Racing	1:17.352	+0.415

=== Night Practice ===
The night practice session took place at 7:30 pm ET on Thursday and ended with Jordan Taylor topping the charts for Wayne Taylor Racing, with a lap time of 1:29.369.

Pos.	Class	No.	Team	Time	Gap
1	P	10	Wayne Taylor Racing	1:29.369	_
2	P	5	Action Express Racing	1:29.436	+0.067
3	P	01	Chip Ganassi Racing	1:29.421	+2.052

=== Final Practice ===
The fourth and final practice session took place at 10:05 am ET on Friday and ended with João Barbosa topping the charts for Action Express Racing, with a lap time of 1:23.262.

Pos.	Class	No.	Team	Driver	Time	Gap
1	P	5	Action Express Racing	João Barbosa	1:23.262	_
2	P	01	Chip Ganassi Racing	Scott Pruett	1:23.626	+0.394
3	GTLM	911	Porsche North America	Nick Tandy	1:24.015	+0.783

== Qualifying ==
Richard Westbrook secured overall pole for the event.

=== Qualifying results ===
Pole positions in each class are indicated in bold and by ‡.

Pos.	Class	No.	Team	Driver	Time	Gap	Grid
1	**P**	**90**	**VisitFlorida.com Racing**	**Richard Westbrook**	**1:27.860**	**_**	1‡
2	P	5	Action Express Racing	Christian Fittipaldi	1:28.920	+1.060	2
3	P	01	Chip Ganassi Racing with Felix Sabates	Joey Hand	1:29.627	+1.767	3
4	GTLM	912	Porsche North America	Earl Bamber	1:30.304^{1}	+2.444	36
5	GTLM	911	Porsche North America	Nick Tandy	1:30.398	+2.538	35
6	P	10	Wayne Taylor Racing	Ricky Taylor	1:30.621	+2.761	4
7	P	31	Action Express Racing	Dane Cameron	1:30.884	+3.024	5
8	**GTLM**	**4**	**Corvette Racing**	**Oliver Gavin**	**1:31.685**	**+3.825**	17‡
9	GTLM	24	BMW Team RLL	Lucas Luhr	1:31.763	+3.903	18
10	**LMPC**	**52**	**PR1/Mathiasen Motorsports**	**Tom Kimber-Smith**	**1:32.378**	**+4.518**	6‡
11	LMPC	16	BAR1 Motorsports	Johnny Mowlem	1:32.924	+5.064	7
12	GTLM	62	Risi Competizione	Giancarlo Fisichella	1:32.989	+5.129	19
13	GTLM	25	BMW Team RLL	Bill Auberlen	1:33.680	+5.820	20
14	GTLM	3	Corvette Racing	Antonio García	1:33.773	+5.913	21
15	PC	88	Starworks Motorsport	Alex Popow	1:33.903	+6.043	16
16	PC	11	RSR Racing	Chris Cumming	1:35.825	+7.965	8
17	PC	85	JDC-Miller MotorSports	Chris Miller	1:36.838	+10.260	9
18	PC	8	Starworks Motorsport	Mirco Schultis	1:38.120	+10.260	10
19	**GTD**	**93**	**Riley Motorsports**	**Cameron Lawrence**	**1:38.295**	**+10.435**	22‡
20	GTD	73	Park Place Motorsports	Spencer Pumpelly	1:38.886	+11.026	23
21	GTD	22	Alex Job Racing	Leh Keen	1:38.899	+11.039	24
22	P	0	Claro/TracFone DeltaWing Racing	Katherine Legge	1:39.618	+11.758	11
23	GTD	45	Flying Lizard Motorsports	Guy Cosmo	1:41.604	+13.744	25
24	GTD	33	Riley Motorsports	Ben Keating	1:41.698	+13.838	26
25	GTD	63	Scuderia Corsa	Jeff Segal	1:41.750	+13.890	27
26	GTD	64	Scuderia Corsa	Daniel Serra	1:42.627	+14.767	28
27	PC	54	CORE Autosport	Anthony Lazzaro	1:42.775	+14.915	12
28	GTD	007	TRG-AMR	Christina Nielsen	1:42.911	+15.051	29
29	GTD	48	Paul Miller Racing	Dion von Moltke	1:43.620	+15.760	30
30	GTD	23	Team Seattle/Alex Job Racing	Mario Farnbacher	1:44.320	+16.460	31
31	GTD	44	Magnus Racing	John Potter	1:47.000	+19.140	32
32	GTLM	17	Team Falken Tire	Bryan Sellers	No time	_	34
33	P	07	Mazda Motorsports	None	No time	_	14
34	PC	38	Performance Tech Motorsports	None	No time	_	37
35	P	60	Michael Shank Racing with Curb-Agajanian	None	No time	_	13
36	P	70	Mazda Motorsports	None	No time	_	15
37	GTD	97	Turner Motorsport	None	No time	_	33

- ^{1} The No. 912 Porsche North America entry had its fastest lap deleted as penalty for causing a red flag during its qualifying session.

== Results ==
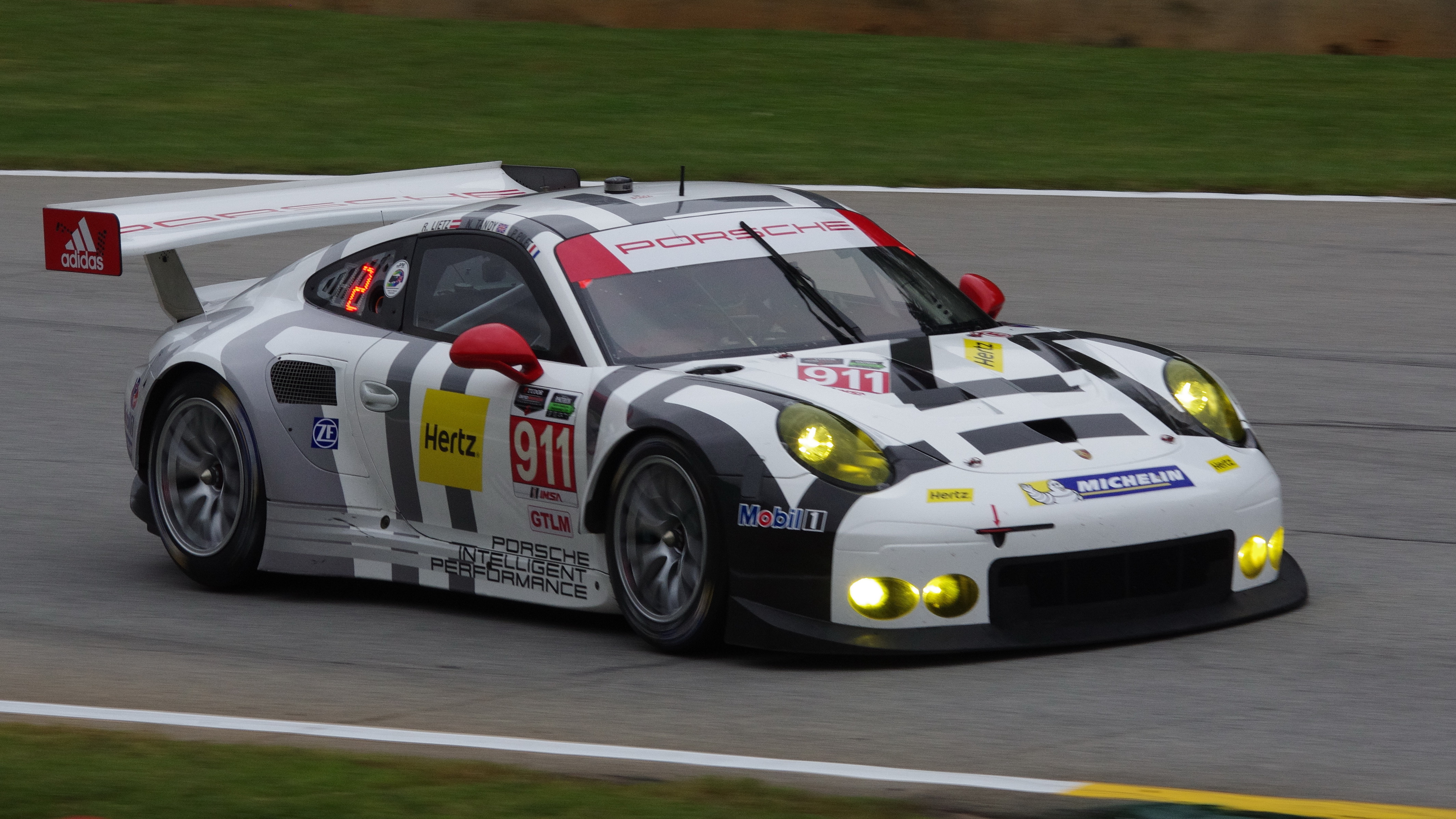
The overall race winner, the No. 911 Porsche 911 RSR.

Class winners denoted in bold and with ‡.

Final race classification
Pos	Class	No.	Team	Drivers	Chassis	Tire	Laps	Time/Retired
Pos	Class	No.	Team	Drivers	Engine	Tire	Laps	Time/Retired
1	**GTLM**	**911**	**Porsche North America**	**(Austria) Richard Lietz (France) Patrick Pilet (United Kingdom) Nick Tandy**	**Porsche 911 RSR**	M	**199**	**7:51:12.894‡**
1	**GTLM**	**911**	**Porsche North America**	**(Austria) Richard Lietz (France) Patrick Pilet (United Kingdom) Nick Tandy**	**Porsche 4.0 L Flat-6**	M	**199**	**7:51:12.894‡**
2	GTLM	24	BMW Team RLL	(United States) John Edwards (Germany) Jens Klingmann (Germany) Lucas Luhr	BMW Z4 GTE	M	199	+5.475
2	GTLM	24	BMW Team RLL	(United States) John Edwards (Germany) Jens Klingmann (Germany) Lucas Luhr	BMW 4.4 L V8	M	199	+5.475
3	**P**	**5**	**Action Express Racing**	**(Portugal) João Barbosa (France) Sébastien Bourdais (Brazil) Christian Fittipaldi**	**Chevrolet Corvette DP**	C	**199**	**+8.524‡**
3	**P**	**5**	**Action Express Racing**	**(Portugal) João Barbosa (France) Sébastien Bourdais (Brazil) Christian Fittipaldi**	**Chevrolet LS6 5.0 L V8**	C	**199**	**+8.524‡**
4	P	01	Chip Ganassi Racing with Felix Sabates	(New Zealand) Scott Dixon (United States) Joey Hand (United States) Scott Pruett	Riley XXVI	C	199	+8.773
4	P	01	Chip Ganassi Racing with Felix Sabates	(New Zealand) Scott Dixon (United States) Joey Hand (United States) Scott Pruett	Ford EcoBoost 3.5 L Turbo V6	C	199	+8.773
5	P	31	Action Express Racing	(United States) Dane Cameron (United States) Eric Curran (Italy) Max Papis	Chevrolet Corvette DP	C	199	+9.908
5	P	31	Action Express Racing	(United States) Dane Cameron (United States) Eric Curran (Italy) Max Papis	Chevrolet LS6 5.0 L V8	C	199	+9.908
6	GTLM	4	Corvette Racing	(Australia) Ryan Briscoe (United Kingdom) Oliver Gavin (United States) Tommy Milner	Chevrolet Corvette C7.R	M	199	+11.764
6	GTLM	4	Corvette Racing	(Australia) Ryan Briscoe (United Kingdom) Oliver Gavin (United States) Tommy Milner	Chevrolet LT5.5 5.5 L V8	M	199	+11.764
7	P	10	Wayne Taylor Racing	(Italy) Max Angelelli (United States) Jordan Taylor (United States) Ricky Taylor	Chevrolet Corvette DP	C	199	+13.378
7	P	10	Wayne Taylor Racing	(Italy) Max Angelelli (United States) Jordan Taylor (United States) Ricky Taylor	Chevrolet LS6 5.0 L V8	C	199	+13.378
8	GTLM	25	BMW Team RLL	(United States) Bill Auberlen (Brazil) Augusto Farfus (Germany) Dirk Werner	BMW Z4 GTE	M	199	+14.446
8	GTLM	25	BMW Team RLL	(United States) Bill Auberlen (Brazil) Augusto Farfus (Germany) Dirk Werner	BMW 4.4 L V8	M	199	+14.446
9	GTLM	62	Risi Competizione	(Italy) Giancarlo Fisichella (Germany) Pierre Kaffer (Finland) Toni Vilander	Ferrari 458 Italia GT2	M	199	+20.840
9	GTLM	62	Risi Competizione	(Italy) Giancarlo Fisichella (Germany) Pierre Kaffer (Finland) Toni Vilander	Ferrari F142 4.5 L V8	M	199	+20.840
10	GTLM	3	Corvette Racing	(Australia) Ryan Briscoe (Spain) Antonio García (Denmark) Jan Magnussen	Chevrolet Corvette C7.R	M	198	+1 Lap
10	GTLM	3	Corvette Racing	(Australia) Ryan Briscoe (Spain) Antonio García (Denmark) Jan Magnussen	Chevrolet LT5.5 5.5 L V8	M	198	+1 Lap
11	GTLM	17	Team Falken Tire	(Germany) Wolf Henzler (United States) Patrick Long (United States) Bryan Sellers	Porsche 911 RSR	F	197	+2 Laps
11	GTLM	17	Team Falken Tire	(Germany) Wolf Henzler (United States) Patrick Long (United States) Bryan Sellers	Porsche 4.0 L Flat-6	F	197	+2 Laps
12	P	90	VisitFlorida.com Racing	(Germany) Mike Rockenfeller (Canada) Michael Valiante (United Kingdom) Richard Westbrook	Chevrolet Corvette DP	C	197	+2 Laps
12	P	90	VisitFlorida.com Racing	(Germany) Mike Rockenfeller (Canada) Michael Valiante (United Kingdom) Richard Westbrook	Chevrolet LS6 5.0 L V8	C	197	+2 Laps
13	GTLM	912	Porsche North America	(New Zealand) Earl Bamber (Germany) Jörg Bergmeister (France) Frédéric Makowiecki	Porsche 911 RSR	M	196	+3 Laps
13	GTLM	912	Porsche North America	(New Zealand) Earl Bamber (Germany) Jörg Bergmeister (France) Frédéric Makowiecki	Porsche 4.0 L Flat-6	M	196	+3 Laps
14	**PC**	**52**	**PR1/Mathiasen Motorsports**	**(United States) Mike Guasch (United Kingdom) Tom Kimber-Smith (United States) Andrew Palmer**	**Oreca FLM09**	C	**194**	**+5 Laps‡**
14	**PC**	**52**	**PR1/Mathiasen Motorsports**	**(United States) Mike Guasch (United Kingdom) Tom Kimber-Smith (United States) Andrew Palmer**	**Chevrolet 6.2 L V8**	C	**194**	**+5 Laps‡**
15	PC	8	Starworks Motorsport	(United States) Mike Hedlund (Venezuela) Alex Popow (Germany) Mirco Schultis (Netherlands) Renger van der Zande	Oreca FLM09	C	194	+5 Laps
15	PC	8	Starworks Motorsport	(United States) Mike Hedlund (Venezuela) Alex Popow (Germany) Mirco Schultis (Netherlands) Renger van der Zande	Chevrolet 6.2 L V8	C	194	+5 Laps
16	PC	16	BAR1 Motorsports	(United States) Tomy Drissi (United States) Marc Drumwright (United Kingdom) Johnny Mowlem (United States) Don Yount	Oreca FLM09	C	193	+6 Laps
16	PC	16	BAR1 Motorsports	(United States) Tomy Drissi (United States) Marc Drumwright (United Kingdom) Johnny Mowlem (United States) Don Yount	Chevrolet 6.2 L V8	C	193	+6 Laps
17	**GTD**	**73**	**Park Place Motorsports**	**(United States) Patrick Lindsey (United States) Spencer Pumpelly (United States) Madison Snow**	**Porsche 911 GT America**	C	**192**	**+7 Laps‡**
17	**GTD**	**73**	**Park Place Motorsports**	**(United States) Patrick Lindsey (United States) Spencer Pumpelly (United States) Madison Snow**	**Porsche 4.0 L Flat-6**	C	**192**	**+7 Laps‡**
18	GTD	44	Magnus Racing	(United States) Andy Lally (United States) John Potter (Germany) Robert Renauer	Porsche 911 GT America	C	192	+7 Laps
18	GTD	44	Magnus Racing	(United States) Andy Lally (United States) John Potter (Germany) Robert Renauer	Porsche 4.0 L Flat-6	C	192	+7 Laps
19	GTD	93	Riley Motorsports	(United States) Al Carter (Belgium) Marc Goossens (United States) Cameron Lawrence	Dodge Viper SRT GT3-R	C	192	+7 Laps
19	GTD	93	Riley Motorsports	(United States) Al Carter (Belgium) Marc Goossens (United States) Cameron Lawrence	Dodge 8.0 L V10	C	192	+7 Laps
20	GTD	63	Scuderia Corsa	(United States) Townsend Bell (United States) Jeff Segal (United States) Bill Sweedler	Ferrari 458 Italia GT3	C	192	+7 Laps
20	GTD	63	Scuderia Corsa	(United States) Townsend Bell (United States) Jeff Segal (United States) Bill Sweedler	Ferrari F142 4.5 L V8	C	192	+7 Laps
21	GTD	45	Flying Lizard Motorsports	(United States) Guy Cosmo (United States) Colin Thompson (United States) Robert Thorne	Audi R8 LMS	C	192	+7 Laps
21	GTD	45	Flying Lizard Motorsports	(United States) Guy Cosmo (United States) Colin Thompson (United States) Robert Thorne	Audi 5.2 L V10	C	192	+7 Laps
22	GTD	64	Scuderia Corsa	(Italy) Matteo Cressoni (Brazil) Daniel Serra (United States) Jeff Westphal	Ferrari 458 Italia GT3	C	192	+7 Laps
22	GTD	64	Scuderia Corsa	(Italy) Matteo Cressoni (Brazil) Daniel Serra (United States) Jeff Westphal	Ferrari F142 4.5 L V8	C	192	+7 Laps
23	GTD	23	Team Seattle/Alex Job Racing	(Germany) Mario Farnbacher (United Kingdom) Ian James (Spain) Alex Riberas	Porsche 911 GT America	C	192	+7 Laps
23	GTD	23	Team Seattle/Alex Job Racing	(Germany) Mario Farnbacher (United Kingdom) Ian James (Spain) Alex Riberas	Porsche 4.0 L Flat-6	C	192	+7 Laps
24	GTD	22	Alex Job Racing	(United States) Andrew Davis (United States) Leh Keen (United States) Cooper MacNeil	Porsche 911 GT America	C	192	+7 Laps
24	GTD	22	Alex Job Racing	(United States) Andrew Davis (United States) Leh Keen (United States) Cooper MacNeil	Porsche 4.0 L Flat-6	C	192	+7 Laps
25	GTD	007	TRG-AMR	(United States) Brandon Davis (Denmark) Christina Nielsen (Canada) Kuno Wittmer	Aston Martin V12 Vantage GT3	C	191	+8 Laps
25	GTD	007	TRG-AMR	(United States) Brandon Davis (Denmark) Christina Nielsen (Canada) Kuno Wittmer	Aston Martin 6.0 L V12	C	191	+8 Laps
26	GTD	48	Paul Miller Racing	(Germany) Christopher Haase (United States) Bryce Miller (South Africa) Dion von Moltke	Audi R8 LMS	C	191	+8 Laps
26	GTD	48	Paul Miller Racing	(Germany) Christopher Haase (United States) Bryce Miller (South Africa) Dion von Moltke	Audi 5.2 L V10	C	191	+8 Laps
27	GTD	97	Turner Motorsport	(United States) Billy Johnson (United States) Michael Marsal (Finland) Markus Palttala (United Kingdom) Andy Priaulx	BMW Z4 GT3	C	189	+10 Laps
27	GTD	97	Turner Motorsport	(United States) Billy Johnson (United States) Michael Marsal (Finland) Markus Palttala (United Kingdom) Andy Priaulx	BMW 4.4 L V8	C	189	+10 Laps
28	GTD	33	Riley Motorsports	(Netherlands) Jeroen Bleekemolen (Netherlands) Sebastiaan Bleekemolen (United States) Ben Keating	Dodge Viper SRT GT3-R	C	185	+14 Laps
28	GTD	33	Riley Motorsports	(Netherlands) Jeroen Bleekemolen (Netherlands) Sebastiaan Bleekemolen (United States) Ben Keating	Dodge 8.0 L V10	C	185	+14 Laps
29	PC	54	CORE Autosport	(United States) Jon Bennett (United States) Colin Braun (United States) Anthony Lazzaro	Oreca FLM09	C	174	+25 Laps
29	PC	54	CORE Autosport	(United States) Jon Bennett (United States) Colin Braun (United States) Anthony Lazzaro	Chevrolet 6.2 L V8	C	174	+25 Laps
30	P	07	Mazda Motorsports	(United States) Joel Miller (United States) Tom Long	Mazda Prototype	C	167	Did not finish
30	P	07	Mazda Motorsports	(United States) Joel Miller (United States) Tom Long	Mazda SkyActiv-D 2.2 L Turbo I4 (Diesel)	C	167	Did not finish
31	P	70	Mazda Motorsports	(United States) Jonathan Bomarito (United States) Tristan Nunez (Canada) Sylvain Tremblay	Mazda Prototype	C	158	Did not finish
31	P	70	Mazda Motorsports	(United States) Jonathan Bomarito (United States) Tristan Nunez (Canada) Sylvain Tremblay	Mazda SkyActiv-D 2.2 L Turbo I4 (Diesel)	C	158	Did not finish
32	PC	85	JDC-Miller MotorSports	(Canada) Misha Goikhberg (United States) Chris Miller (United States) Rusty Mitchell	Oreca FLM09	C	145	Did not finish
32	PC	85	JDC-Miller MotorSports	(Canada) Misha Goikhberg (United States) Chris Miller (United States) Rusty Mitchell	Chevrolet 6.2 L V8	C	145	Did not finish
33	P	0	Claro/TracFone DeltaWing Racing	(United Kingdom) Katherine Legge (United Kingdom) Andy Meyrick (Mexico) Memo Rojas	DeltaWing DWC13	C	133	Did not finish
33	P	0	Claro/TracFone DeltaWing Racing	(United Kingdom) Katherine Legge (United Kingdom) Andy Meyrick (Mexico) Memo Rojas	Élan 1.4 L Turbo I4	C	133	Did not finish
34	PC	11	RSR Racing	(Canada) Chris Cumming (Brazil) Bruno Junqueira (United States) Gustavo Menezes	Oreca FLM09	C	105	Did not finish
34	PC	11	RSR Racing	(Canada) Chris Cumming (Brazil) Bruno Junqueira (United States) Gustavo Menezes	Chevrolet 6.2 L V8	C	105	Did not finish
35	P	60	Michael Shank Racing with Curb-Agajanian	(United States) Matt McMurry (Brazil) Oswaldo Negri (United States) John Pew	Ligier JS P2	C	100	Did not finish
35	P	60	Michael Shank Racing with Curb-Agajanian	(United States) Matt McMurry (Brazil) Oswaldo Negri (United States) John Pew	Honda HR28TT 2.8 L Twin-turbo V6	C	100	Did not finish
36	PC	88	Starworks Motorsport	(United States) John Falb (Venezuela) Alex Popow (United States) Sean Rayhall	Oreca FLM09	C	79	Did not finish
36	PC	88	Starworks Motorsport	(United States) John Falb (Venezuela) Alex Popow (United States) Sean Rayhall	Chevrolet 6.2 L V8	C	79	Did not finish
DNS	PC	38	Performance Tech Motorsports	(United States) Conor Daly (United States) James French (United States) Jerome Mee	Oreca FLM09	C	–	Did not start
DNS	PC	38	Performance Tech Motorsports	(United States) Conor Daly (United States) James French (United States) Jerome Mee	Chevrolet 6.2 L V8	C	–	Did not start

Tyre manufacturers
Key
Symbol	Tyre manufacturer
**C**	Continental
**M**	Michelin
**F**	Falken Tire

United SportsCar Championship
Previous race: Lone Star Le Mans	2015 season	Next race: None
