= 2000 Barber Dodge Pro Series =

2000 Barber Dodge Pro Series season

Seasons
- ← 1999 2001 →

The 2000 Barber Dodge Pro Series season was the fifteenth season of this racing series. The championship was won by Nilton Rossoni. Ryan Hunter-Reay won the Rookie of the Year title. This was the first season the series raced outside of the United States. The Barber Dodge Pro Series supported the CART World Series at the Molson Indy Vancouver

== Drivers ==
All drivers use Dodge-powered, Michelin-shod Reynard 98E chassis.

No.	Driver	Note
4	(United States) Brent Sherman	
5	(Netherlands) Sepp Koster	
7	(United States) Jamie Menninga	
8	(United States) Peter Boss	
9	(United States) Roger Yasukawa	1999 Co-rookie of the year
11	(Sweden) Thed Björk	
12	(United States) Keith Dusko	
15	(United States) Aaron Bambach	
15	(United States) Jonathon Bottoms	Round 8 only
16	(United States) Jeff Morton	
17	(United States) Matt Plumb	
18	(United States) Bryan Sellers	Round 10 & 11 only
19	(United States) Sara Senske	Except round 7
19	(United States) Joey Hand	Round 7 only
20	(Brazil) Alexandre Sperafico	
21	(United States) Jon Vannini	
22	(United States) Jay Ricci	
23	(United States) Marc Breuers	
22	(United States) Jay Ricci	
25	(United States) Kip Gulseth	
26	(United States) Rhonda Trammell	
27	(United Kingdom) Charles Putt	
28	(Brazil) Andre Nicastro	
31	(United States) Ryan Hunter-Reay	"Big Scholarship" winner
33	(Venezuela) Milka Duno	
36	(Brazil) Nilton Rossoni	
42	(United States) John Hall	
44	(United Kingdom) Sam Hancock	
45	(Brazil) Giuliano Pilagallo	
46	(Switzerland) Gilles Tinguely	
52	(United States) Jon Fogarty	
53	(United States) Tom Fogarty	
55	(Canada) John McCaig	
62	(United States) Andy Lally	As of round 2
63	(United States) Craig Duerson	
66	(Canada) Ryan Vella	
73	(United States) Jeff Glenn	
77	(United States) Scott Mayer	
82	(Canada) Jonathon Macri	
83	(United States) Shareef Malnik	
95	(Canada) Michael Valiante	
97	(United States) Ryan Howe	
99	(United States) Davy Cook	
	(Brazil) Vanderlan Jr.	

== Race calendar and results ==
Round	Circuit	Location	Date	Pole position	Fastest lap	Winning driver	Headline event
1	Sebring International Raceway	(United States) Sebring, Florida	March 18	(Canada) Michael Valiante	(Brazil) Nilton Rossoni	(Brazil) Nilton Rossoni	12 Hours of Sebring
2	Homestead-Miami Speedway	(United States) Homestead, Florida	March 25	(Brazil) Andre Nicastro	(Brazil) Nilton Rossoni	(Brazil) Nilton Rossoni	Grand Prix of Miami
3	Nazareth Speedway	(United States) Lehigh Valley, Pennsylvania	April 10	(Netherlands) Sepp Koster	(United States) Roger Yasukawa	(Netherlands) Sepp Koster	Firestone Indy 225
4	Lime Rock Park	(United States) Lime Rock, Connecticut	May 29	(United States) Jon Fogarty	(Sweden) Thed Björk	(United States) Jon Fogarty	Lime Rock Grand Prix
5	Detroit Belle Isle Grand Prix	(United States) Detroit, Michigan	June 18	(United States) Jon Fogarty	(United States) Matt Plumb	(United States) Jon Fogarty	Grand Prix of Detroit
6	Cleveland Burke Lakefront Airport	(United States) Cleveland, Ohio	July 1	(Brazil) Nilton Rossoni	(United States) Jon Fogarty	(Brazil) Nilton Rossoni	Grand Prix of Cleveland
7	Mid-Ohio Sports Car Course	(United States) Lexington, Ohio	August 13	(Sweden) Thed Björk	(Sweden) Thed Björk	(United States) Jon Fogarty	Miller Lite 250
8	Road America	(United States) Elkhart Lake, Wisconsin	August 20	(Brazil) Nilton Rossoni	(United States) Jamie Menninga	(Brazil) Nilton Rossoni	Champ Car Grand Prix of Road America
9	BC Place	(Canada) Vancouver	September 2	(United States) Ryan Hunter-Reay	(United States) Matt Plumb	(United States) Matt Plumb	Molson Indy Vancouver
10	Mazda Raceway Laguna Seca	(United States) Monterey County, California	September 10	(Brazil) Nilton Rossoni	(Brazil) Nilton Rossoni	(Brazil) Nilton Rossoni	Monterey Grand Prix
11	Road Atlanta	(United States) Braselton, Georgia	September 30	(Canada) Michael Valiante	(Netherlands) Sepp Koster	(Canada) Michael Valiante	Petit Le Mans
12	Homestead-Miami Speedway	(United States) Homestead, Florida	October 8	(United States) Jamie Menninga	(Netherlands) Sepp Koster	(Brazil) Nilton Rossoni	Stand-alone event

== Final standings ==
Color	Result
Gold	Winner
Silver	2nd place
Bronze	3rd place
Green	4th & 5th place
Light Blue	6th–10th place
Dark Blue	11th place or lower
Purple	Did not finish
Red	Did not qualify (DNQ)
Brown	Withdrawn (Wth)
Black	Disqualified (DSQ)
White	Did not start (DNS)
Blank	Did not participate (DNP)
Blank	Driver replacement (Rpl)
Blank	Injured (Inj)
Blank	No race held (NH)

Rank	Driver	(United States) SEB	(United States) HMS1	(United States) NAZ	(United States) LRP	(United States) DET	(United States) CLE	(United States) MOH	(United States) ROA	(Canada) VAN	(United States) LAG	(United States) RAT	(United States) HMS2	Points
1	(Brazil) Nilton Rossoni	1	1	16	13	6	1	2	1	4	1	3	1	175
2	(United States) Jon Fogarty	3	2	6	1	1	3	1	9	5	2	15	4	155
3	(Netherlands) Sepp Koster	7	7	1	6	7	2	3	5	2	22	7	2	130
4	(United States) Matt Plumb	6	4	8	22	2	6	7	26	1	26	2	5	112
5	(United States) Ryan Hunter-Reay (R)	8	8	2	4	24	9	6	3	8	5	10	7	104
6	(Canada) Michael Valiante	2	11	4	18	26	10	9	7	17	6	1	6	97
7	(United States) Roger Yasukawa	4	25	5	11	5	5	8	4	11	25	5	8	94
8	(United States) Jamie Menninga	9	17	12	7	3	7	4	2	14	27	4	16	86
9	(Brazil) Alexandre Sperafico	5	9	9	5	23	23	18	10	7	4	8	3	85
10	(Sweden) Thed Björk	10	5	23	12	10	4	11	6	6	8	6	19	83
11	(United States) Andy Lally		3	3	2	11	24	5		21	3			74
12	(Brazil) Andre Nicastro	11	16	7	23	4	11	10	8	3	7			69
13	(United States) Peter Boss	12	6	14	3	9	12	14	25	12	9			54
14	(United States) Brent Sherman	13	13	11	10	8	25	13	24	20	10	9	14	43
15	(United States) Marc Breuers (R)	15	12	21	9	13	22	17	11	9	11	12	18	36
16	(United States) Kip Gulseth	16	14	17	19	12	16	16	13	10	12	14	17	21
17	(United States) Tom Fogarty	22	10	18	14	18	18	23	15	13	13	18	13	18
18	(Canada) Jonathan Macri	14	18	10	8									16
19	(United States) Sara Senske (R)	23	15	19	21	25	13		20	15	24	11	10	16
20	(Canada) John McCaig					15	8	28		19				9
21	(United States) Davy Cook								18		14		9	9
22	(United States) Jon Vannini (R)	20	21	15	15	17	14	27	19	22	15	16	12	9
23	(Brazil) Rafael Sperafico												11	5
24	(United Kingdom) Sam Hancock	28	23	13	20	14								5
25	(United States) Joey Hand							12						4
26	(United States) Bryan Sellers								12					4
27	(United States) Mikel Miller											13		3
28	(United States) Jeff Glenn					16	19	29	14		17			2
29	(Switzerland) Gilles Tinguely						15							1
30	(United States) Jon Morley							15						1
31	(United States) Shareef Malnik												15	1
32	(United States) Jay Ricci	26	20		16	19	17	20	16		18			0
33	(United States) Scott Mayer	25		DNS		22	20	25	17	16	19	17		0
34	(Venezuela) Milka Duno (R)	24	24	20	17	20	21	24	22					0
35	(United States) Craig Duerson (R)	17												0
36	(United States) John Hall							26	21	18	20			0
37	(Canada) Ryan Vella	18												0
38	(United States) Rhonda Trammell	19	19	22				22	23		21			0
39	(United States) Ryan Howe							19			16			0
40	(United Kingdom) Charles Putt	21												0
41	(United States) Jeff Morton					21								0
42	(United States) Jonathon Bottoms							21						0
43	(United States) Keith Dusko (R)	27	22								23			0

- (R) indicates rookie driver
