= Nilton Rossoni =

Brazilian racing driver

- Nationality: (Brazil) Brazilian
- Born: April 21, 1981 Curitiba, Paraná
- Retired: 2002

Barber Dodge Pro Series
- Years active: 1997-2000, 2002
- Starts: 35
- Wins: 10
- Poles: 6
- Fastest laps: 7
- Best finish: 1st in 2000

Previous series
- 1997-2000 2001 2002: Barber Dodge Pro Series; Indy Lights; Barber Dodge Pro Series

Championship titles
- 2000: Barber Dodge Pro Series

Nilton 'Niltinho' Rossoni (Curitiba, April 21, 1981) is a former Brazilian racing driver who won the 2000 Barber Dodge Pro Series championship.

== Racing career ==
After winning karting championships in the Paraná and São Paulo regions, Rossoni graduated into single-seaters in 1997, where he raced in the Formula Chevrolet Brazil, a support series to the highly popular Stock Car Brasil. He won the rookie of the year title in his inaugural season. Near the end of the racing season, he made his debut in the Barber Dodge Pro Series. He qualified twelfth out of 27 but had to retire after one lap due to a clutch failure. He returned the following year, winning races at Road America and Homestead-Miami Speedway finishing sixth in the standings. The 1999 season was a season in which Rossoni failed to finish six times. At Homestead-Miami Speedway, Rossoni won pole-position but had to retire due to a mechanical issue. He got his revenge in the 2000 season of the Barber Dodge Pro Series. Rossoni won six out of twelve races. Before the final round, only Jon Fogarty had a mathematical chance to win the championship. Rossoni won his title in style by winning the final round of the season. After his success, he graduated into the Indy Lights. But as the economic crisis hit Brazil, his longtime sponsor Fox Distribuidora de Petróleo (owned by the Rossoni family) almost went bankrupt. Rossoni could only compete one race, at Fundidora park supporting the Tecate/Telmex Grand Prix of Monterrey. His weekend started well as he qualified in second place. Rossoni had a poor start of the race as he was passed by Townsend Bell and passed the finish line in seventh place after the first lap. Rossoni failed to finish as he wrecked his car after four laps. After his nightmare 2001 season, Rossoni decided to return to the Barber Dodge Pro Series in 2002 for two races. After two fourth place finishes, he retired from professional racing.

== Motorsports results ==
=== American Open-Wheel racing results ===
(key) (Races in bold indicate pole position, races in italics indicate fastest race lap)

==== Barber Dodge Pro Series ====
Year	1	2	3	4	5	6	7	8	9	10	11	12	Rank	Points
1997	STP	SEB	SAV	LRP	MOH	WGI	MIN	MOH	ROA	LS	REN	LS; 26	**NC**	-
1998	SEB; 22	LRP; 21	DET; 2	**WGI**; 21	CLE; 5	GRA	MOH	**ROA**; 1	LS1	ATL	HMS; 1	LS2; 3	**6th**	**83**
1999	SEB; 2	NAZ; 7	LRP; 21	POR; 2	CLE; 1	ROA; 6	DET; 20	MOH; 20	GRA; 15	LS; 18	**HMS**; 18	**WGI**; 1	**6th**	**94**
2000	SEB; 1	MIA; 1	NAZ; 16	LRP; 13	DET; 6	**CLE**; 1	MOH; 2	**ROA**; 1	VAN; 4	LS; 1	RAT; 3	HMS; 1	**1st**	**175**
2002	SEB; 4	LRP; 4	LAG	POR	TOR	CLE	VAN	MOH	ROA	MTL			**19th**	**25**

==== Indy Lights ====
Year	Team	1	2	3	4	5	6	7	8	9	10	11	12	Rank	Points	Ref
2001	Conquest Racing	MTY; 12	LBH	TXS	MIL	POR	KAN	TOR	MOH	STL	ATL	LS	FON	**16th**	**1**	

Sporting positions
Preceded by Jeff Simmons	Barber Dodge Pro Series Champion; 2000	Succeeded by Nicolas Rondet
