= Rafael Sperafico =

Brazilian racing driver (1981–2007)

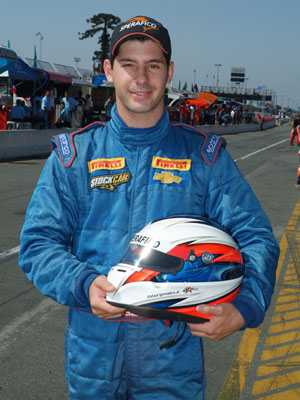
Rafael Sperafico in 2007

Rafael Sperafico (22 April 1981 – 9 December 2007) was a Brazilian racing driver. He was the cousin of fellow racing drivers Ricardo and Rodrigo, and also related to Alexandre. He was born in Toledo, Paraná.

== Career ==
=== Barber Dodge ===
Sperafico competed in the United States-based Barber Dodge Pro Series from 2000 to 2002, finishing as championship runner-up in his final year.

=== Euro F3000 ===
Sperafico moved to Europe for 2003 to compete in the Euro Formula 3000 series, where he finished 15th in the championship with two points. He thus followed in the footsteps of his relatives Ricardo, Rodrigo and Alexandre, who had all previously competed in the FIA International version of the series.

=== Renault Clio Cup ===
In 2006, Sperafico took part in the Renault Super Clio Cup Brazil, finishing fourth in the championship.

== Death ==
On 9 December 2007, Sperafico was driving in a Stock Car Light race at the Autódromo José Carlos Pace, supporting the season finale of the main Stock Car Brasil championship in which his older cousins Ricardo and Rodrigo were both competing. On lap six of the race, Sperafico lost control of his car on the fast left-hand corner immediately before the start-finish straight (Subida dos Boxes) and speared into the retaining wall on the right-hand side of the circuit at high speed. The force of the impact saw the damaged car rebound onto the racing line, where it was t-boned by Renato Russo, triggering a pile-up involving several other drivers. The race was stopped and the circuit's medical personnel quickly arrived at the scene, where Sperafico died from massive head injuries. Russo also suffered severe head injuries and was taken to hospital, where he was in a serious but stable condition. Several other drivers were treated for minor injuries. Russo was released from hospital on 17 December.

On the same day, Sperafico's cousin, Rodrigo, became runner-up of the 2007 Stock Car Brasil Championship. Gustavo Sondermann, Rafael Sperafico's teammate at the time, was killed a few years later in an almost identical crash at the same corner.

== Complete motorsports results ==
=== American Open-Wheel racing results ===
(key) (Races in bold indicate pole position, races in italics indicate fastest race lap)

==== Barber Dodge Pro Series ====
Year	1	2	3	4	5	6	7	8	9	10	11	12	Rank	Points
2000	SEB	MIA	NAZ	LRP	DET	CLE	MOH	ROA	VAN	LS	RAT	HMS; 5	**23rd**	**5**
2001	SEB; 6	PIR; 3	LRP1; 4	LRP2; 7	DET; 14	CLE; 16	TOR; 18	CHI; 10	MOH; 12	ROA; 12	VAN; 8	LS; 3	**7th**	**84**
2002	SEB; 22	LRP; 3	**LAG**; 1	POR; 5	**TOR**; 11	CLE; 5	VAN; 2	MOH; 2	ROA; 8	MTL; 3			**2nd**	**119**

=== Complete Euro Formula 3000 results ===
(key) (Races in bold indicate pole position) (Races in italics indicate fastest lap)

Year	Entrant	1	2	3	4	5	6	7	8	9	DC	Points
2003	ADM Motorsport	NÜR1; 9	MAG; 12	PER; Ret	MON; Ret	SPA; Ret	DON; 9	BRN; 5	JER	CAG	15th	2
