= Alex García (racing driver, born 1977) =

Venezuelan racing driver

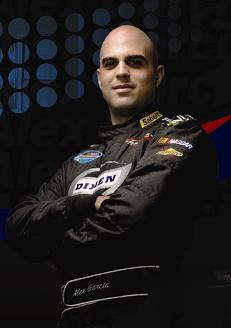
- Born: March 18, 1977 (age 49); Caracas, Venezuela

NASCAR O'Reilly Auto Parts Series career
- 5 races run over 2 years
- Best finish: 104th – 2007, 2008
- First race: 2007 Telcel Motorola Mexico 200 (Mexico City)
- Last race: 2008 NAPA Auto Parts 200 (Montreal)
Wins	Top tens	Poles
0	0	0
- Statistics up to date as of June 11, 2012.

Alex García (born March 18, 1977) is a Venezuelan former professional stock car racing driver who last competed in the NASCAR Nationwide Series. Known as a road course ringer, García drove the No. 98 Dixien/OmniSource Chevrolet for Transnet Racing, a team he owned. Alex García made his NASCAR Nationwide Series debut in the 2007 Telcel Motorola Mexico 200 in Mexico City, where he became the first Venezuelan to race in one of NASCAR's top three series.

== Background ==
Originally from Caracas, Venezuela, García immigrated to the United States with his family in 1988 at the age of 11. He and his family settled in Marietta, Georgia, where he still lives today.

At the age of 16, several years after his Argentine uncle sparked his interest in racing, García drove his first race car. After that, García decided to embark on a career in professional racing.

An owner of his equipment from the beginning of his racing career, García formed Transnet Racing, which began with a single mechanic in his parents' garage, and has now grown into an established organization with a 10,000-square-foot (930 m^{2}) shop in Morrow, GA, just south of Atlanta.

== Open Wheel career ==
Alex García began his racing career in open wheel racing. In 1994, Alex raced at the amateur level in SCCA Formula Vee racing, scoring five top-five finishes in his first season. The following year García moved up to Formula Ford racing, where multiple victories and eleven top-five finishes progressed his career from regional racing to success at the national level. By 1997, Alex was able to go pro, racing Formula Ford 2000. 1998 was a successful season in Formula Ford 2000, and García earned top-ten and top-five finishing and starting positions throughout the season.

By 2000, García developed a sponsorship deal with Dixien Automotive Stampings and OmniSource, relationships which still exist today, and this allowed García to begin full-time racing in Atlantic Championship.

In 2004, the Atlantic operation expanded to a two car team, and Transnet Racing began to experience tremendous success in the series, earning the first of the team’s podium finishes, with both cars consistently bringing home top-five's and top-ten's. Seeking to diversify his skills, García began to test other forms of auto racing, which led to experimentation with Daytona Prototype, and, ultimately, stock car racing.

== Transition to stock cars ==
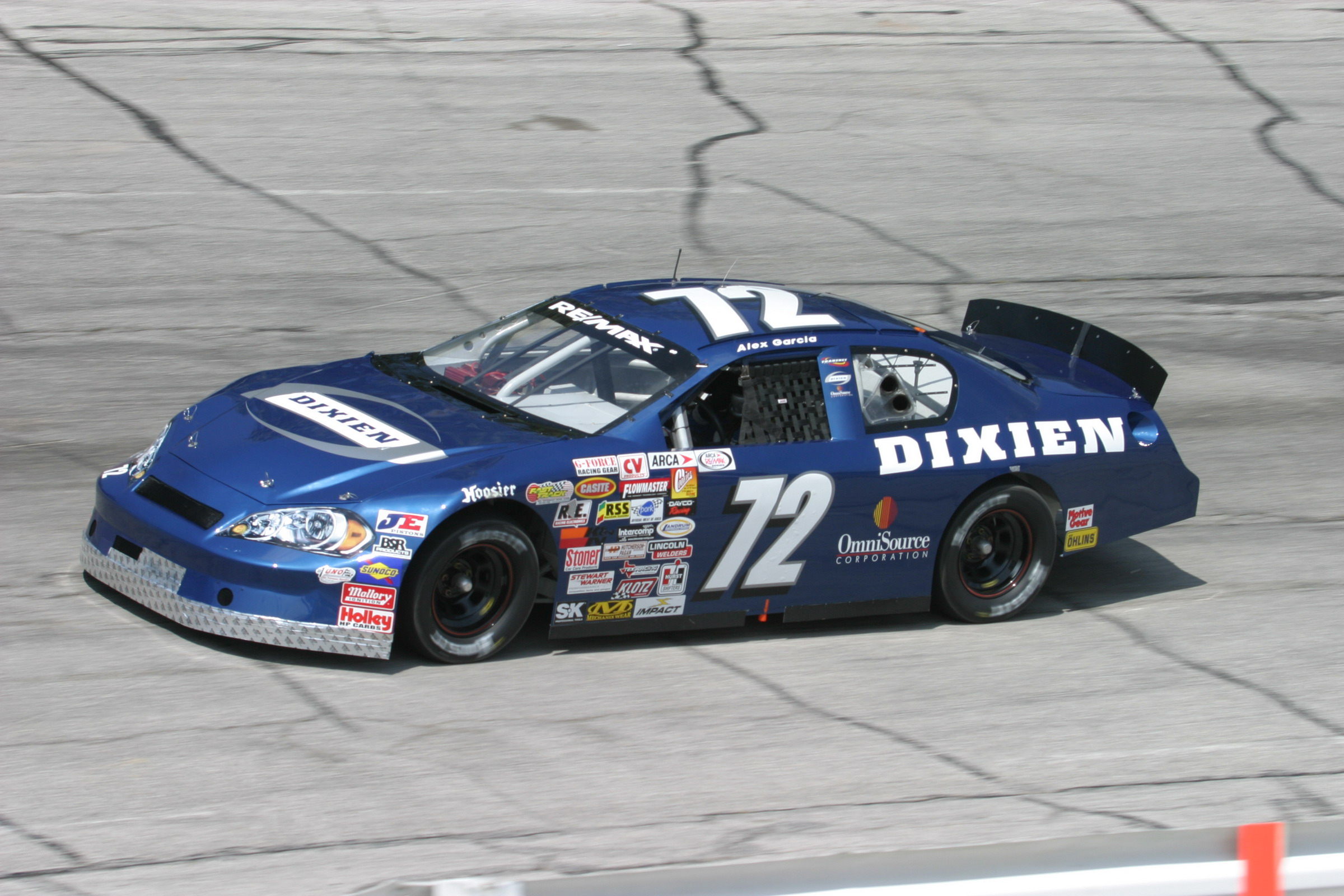
Alex García in his ARCA RE/MAX Series debut at Salem Speedway, September 2006

In 2005, García received an invitation to compete in the Six Hours of Bogotá, finishing second in a field of over 64 cars. That same year García tested his first stock car at Peach State Speedway, and made his official stock car debut at Music City Motorplex in the NASCAR AutoZone Elite Division. Participating in five races with Clyde Moody Enterprises, Alex earned several top-tens, as well as a POWERade Move of the Race award. Realizing his ultimate passion for full-bodied cars, García purchased his first stock car, and debuted in the ARCA RE/MAX Series at Salem Speedway in September 2006.

By December of the same year, García announced that Transnet Racing would run a partial NASCAR Nationwide Series season in 2007, focusing on road courses, at which he excelled.

== NASCAR career ==
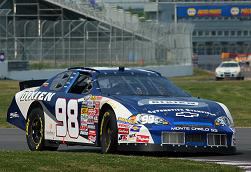
Alex García's No. 98 NASCAR Nationwide Series car in Montreal, Quebec

In March 2007, García made his NASCAR Nationwide Series debut at Autodromo Hermanos Rodriguez in Mexico City, Mexico, becoming the first Venezuelan to race in one of NASCAR's top three series. He competed in two other NASCAR Nationwide Series races that season, the inaugural NAPA Auto Parts 200 at Circuit Gilles Villeneuve in Montreal, Quebec, and the Zippo 200 at Watkins Glen International.

In 2008, García returned for the last NASCAR Nationwide Series race at Autódromo Hermanos Rodríguez. Later that season, he competed at Circuit Gilles Villeneuve, which was a historic race in which teams competed in the rain for the first time in a NASCAR points event.

In 2009, García planned to run his first full-time season in the NASCAR Nationwide Series but he never did.
