= Transnet Racing =

Former NASCAR team

- Owner: Alex García
- Base: Morrow, Georgia
- Series: Nationwide Series
- Race drivers: 98. Alex García

Career
- Drivers' Championships: 0

Transnet Racing was a stock car racing team that competed in the NASCAR Nationwide Series. The team was a Minority Business Enterprise principally owned by Venezuelan driver Alex García.

Transnet Racing's shop was located in Morrow, Georgia, just south of Atlanta. The 10,000-square-foot (930 m^{2}) facility primarily housed the team's NASCAR Nationwide Series program, as well as their Late Model and show car program.

== History ==
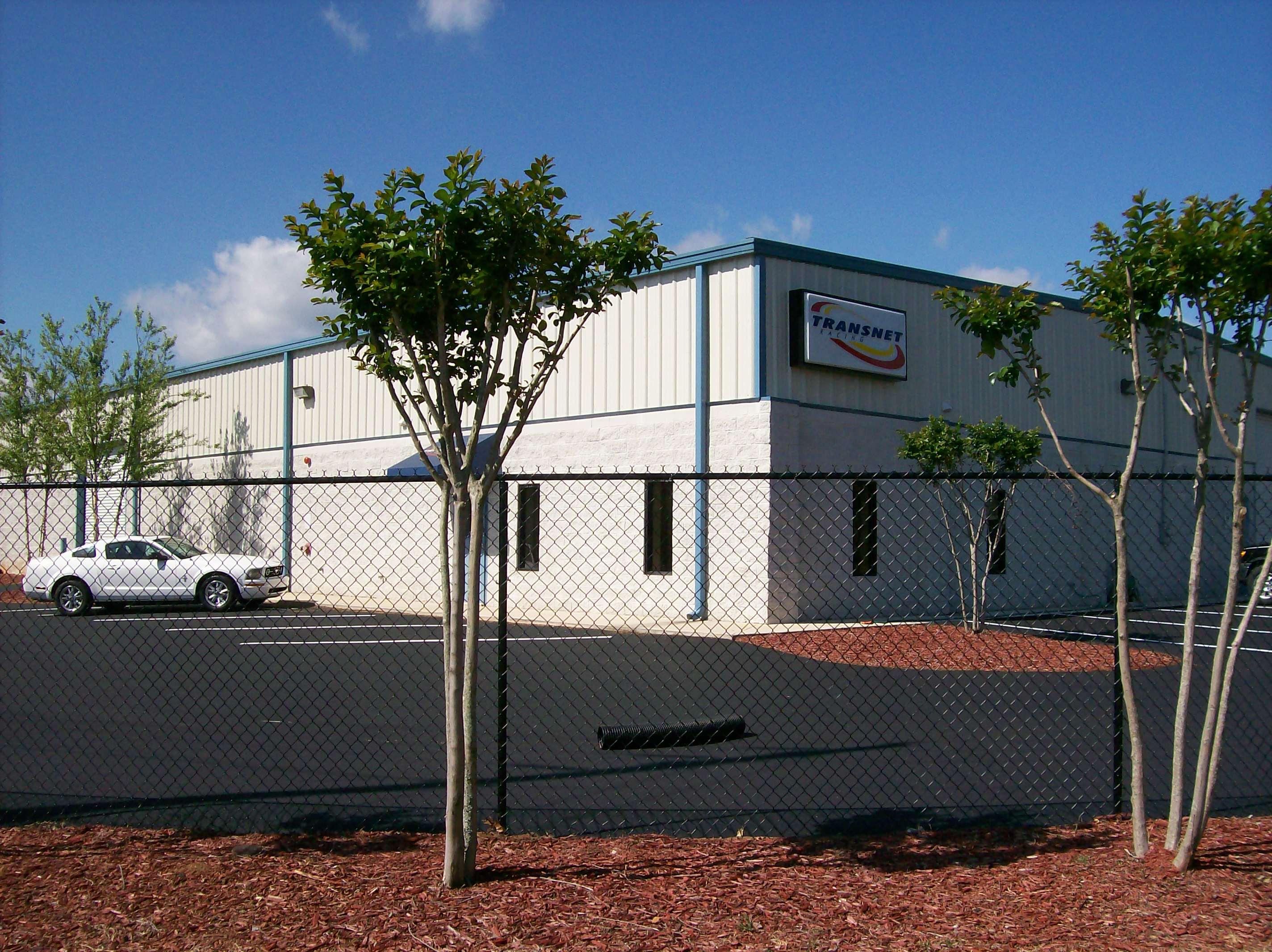
Transnet Racing's shop is located in Morrow, Georgia, just south of Atlanta.

Transnet Racing was founded by Venezuelan driver Alex García and his father Juan, with the goal of participating at the highest levels of U.S. racing and providing a platform for young and skilled drivers looking to compete on an international stage. Initially an open wheel race team, Transnet Racing first participated in Formula Vee, Formula Ford, and Formula Ford 2000 racing. The Hispanic-owned team made its Atlantic Championship debut in 2002 with Alex García behind the wheel, making 22 starts by 2003.

The team expanded to a two-car effort for the 2004 season with Jonathan Bomarito piloting the No. 8 Dixien/OmniSource Swift 014. Transnet Racing made 13 starts and experienced tremendous success during 2004, including earning the team's first podium finish at Portland, but decided to part ways with the series mid-season.

== Transition To Stock Car Racing ==
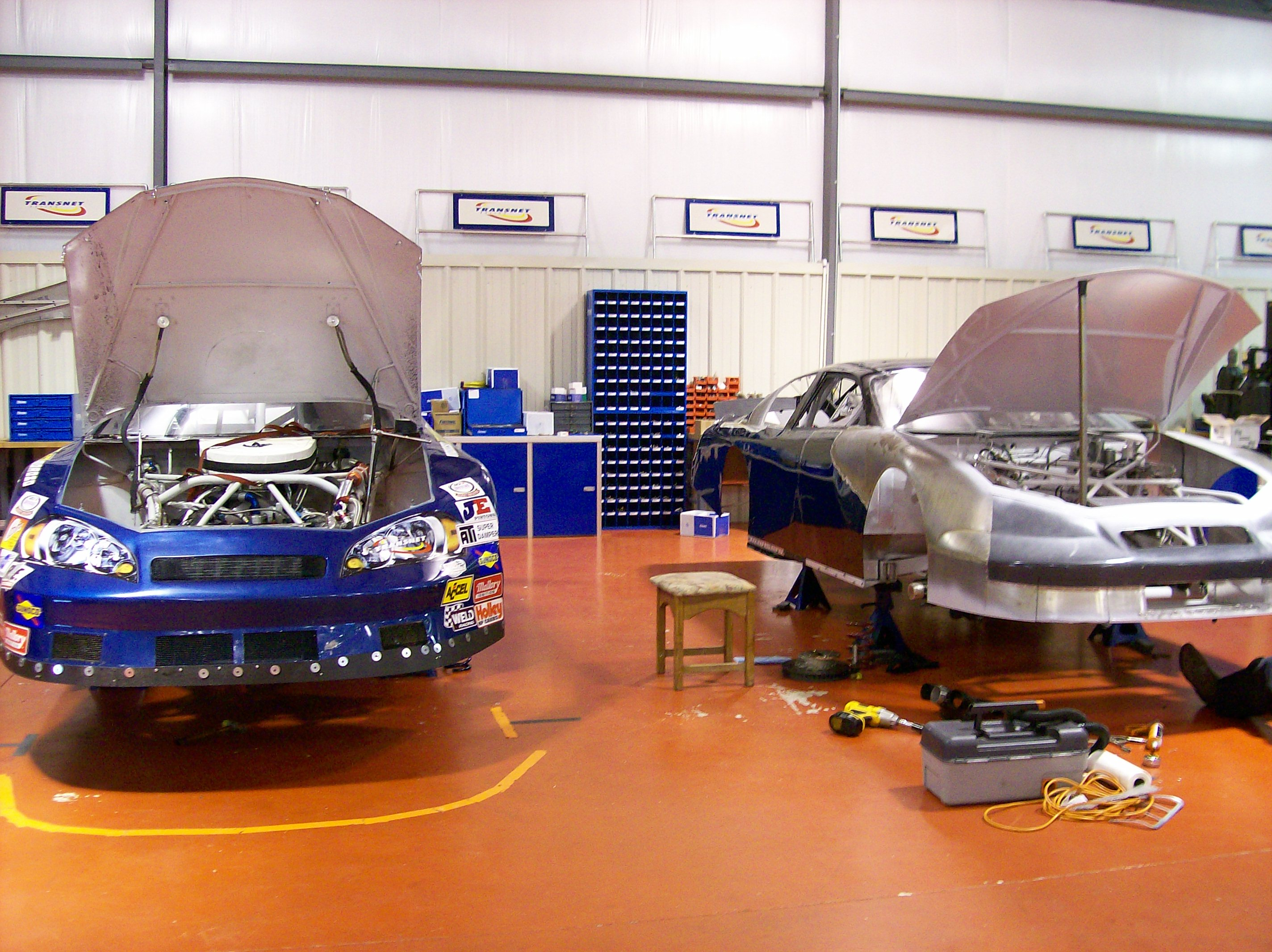
Two cars in progress at the Transnet Racing shop

In 2005 the team began to experiment with stock car racing, competing in NASCAR AutoZone Elite Division races while at the same time moving into a new purpose-built shop in Morrow, Georgia. While Transnet Racing announced its return to the ChampCar Atlantic Championship after a one-year break, it still pursued stock car racing, participating in the ARCA RE/MAX Series event at Salem Speedway in September 2006.

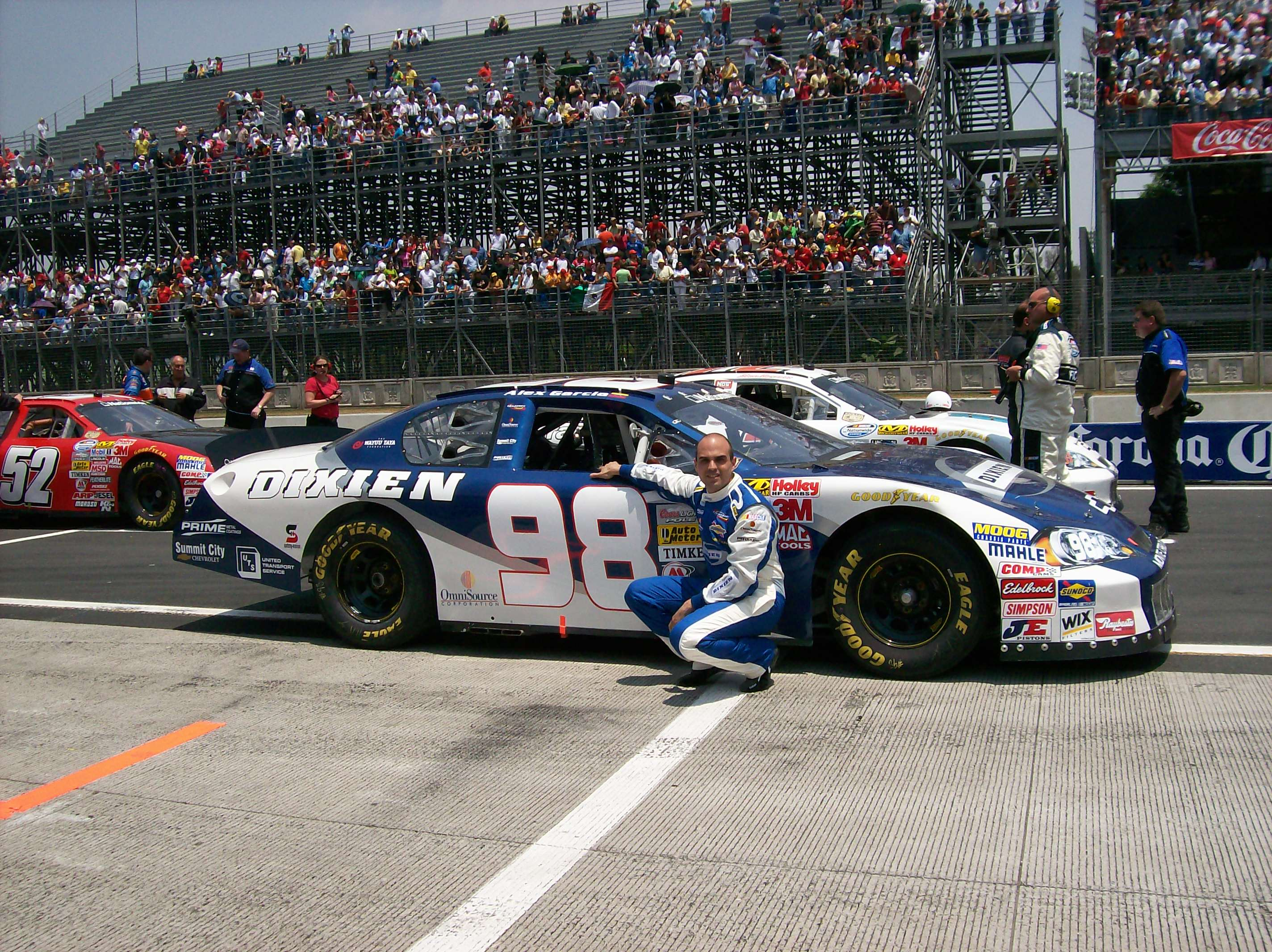
Alex García and the No. 98 on the starting grid in Mexico City, 2008

In December 2006 Transnet Racing announced that it would begin competing in the NASCAR Nationwide Series with Alex García driving the No. 98 Dixien/OmniSource Chevrolet. The team ran part-time schedules in the series in 2007 and 2008, participating in several historic road course events, including the inaugural NAPA Auto Parts 200 at Circuit Gilles Villeneuve in Montreal, Quebec, in 2007, the last NASCAR Nationwide Series race at Autodromo Hermanos Rodriguez, (2008) and the 2008 race at Circuit Gilles Villeneuve, in which teams competed in the rain for the first time in a NASCAR points event. García also became the first Venezuelan driver to compete in one of NASCAR's premier series when he debuted at Autodromo Hermanos Rodriguez in March 2007.

== NASCAR Nationwide Series ==
=== Car No. 98 History ===
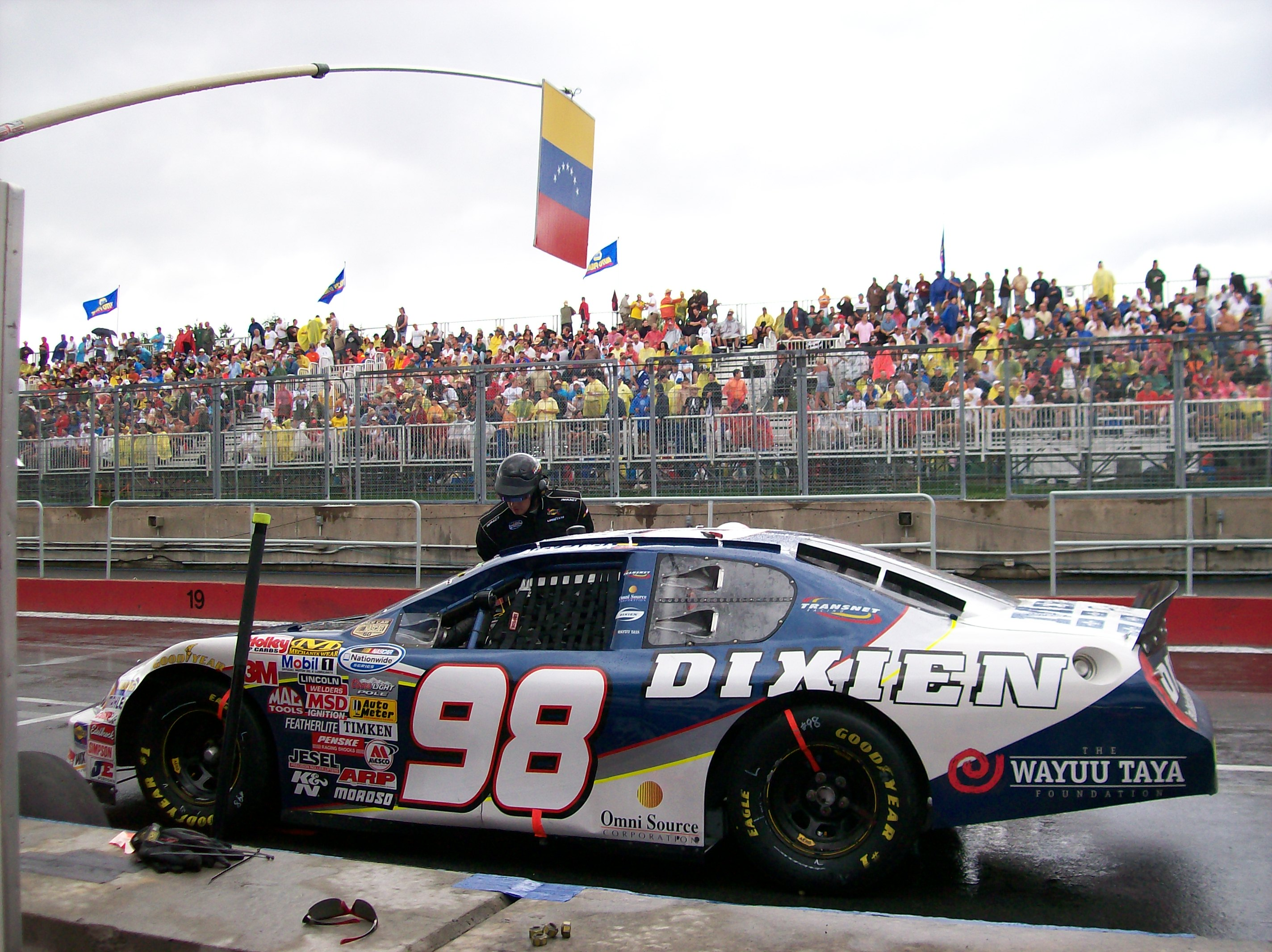
No. 98 Chevy Monte Carlo in the pits at Circuit Gilles Villeneuve, 2008

The No. 98 Chevrolet Monte Carlo first raced in the Telcel Motorola Mexico 200 at Autodromo Hermanos Rodriguez in Mexico City on March 4, 2007. Rookie driver Alex García piloted the car, with sponsorship from Dixien Automotive Stampings and OmniSource for three races in the 2007 season, earning a top finishing position of 23rd. In 2008, Alex García continued to drive the 98 machine, participating in the road course races in Mexico City and Montreal.

After two part-time seasons, the team planned to run the 98 full-time in the Nationwide Series in 2009 with Garcia, but the plans never materialized.

==== Car No. 98 Career Statistics ====
Year	Car	Driver	Races	Wins	Poles	Top 5	Top 10	Season Rank
2007	No. 298	Alex García	3	0	0	0	0	104
2008	No. 198	Alex García	2	0	0	0	0	90
Totals			5	0	0	0		
