= Marc Breuers =

American racing driver

- Nationality: (United States) American
- Born: October 4, 1975 (age 51) New York City, U.S.
- Retired: 2003

Atlantic Championship
- Years active: 2003
- Teams: Brooks Associates Racing
- Starts: 3
- Wins: 0
- Poles: 0
- Fastest laps: 0
- Best finish: 17th in 2003

Previous series
- 2000-2002 1999: Barber Dodge Pro Series; Skip Barber Formula Dodge Eastern Series

Marc Breuers (born 10 April 1975 in New York City) is a former Barber Dodge Pro Series and Atlantic Championship driver.

== Racing career ==
Breuers started his first competitive racing championship in 1999. Breuers won nine races in his inaugural season. Breuers finished second in the championship, three points behind Ryan Hunter-Reay.

Breuers struggled in his first season in the Barber Dodge Pro Series. In 2000, his best results were two ninth place finishes at Lime Rock Park and Vancouver. For 2001, Breuers returned to the series. He captured his first podium finish. At Cleveland, Breuers finished behind Sepp Koster and Matt Plumb. With consistent top-ten finishes, Breuers finished sixth in the standings. Breuers's third, and final, year in the Barber Dodge Pro Series proved to be his best season. With four podium finishes, including a win at Mid-Ohio, Breuers finished third in the standings.

After his strong performance in the Barber Dodge Pro Series, Breuers moved up the ladder into the Atlantic Championship. However due to limited sponsorship he only raced three races. But after failing to achieve major results and failing to gain sponsorship Breuers retired from professional auto racing after the 2003 season.

== Complete motorsports results ==
=== American Open-Wheel racing results ===
(key) (Races in bold indicate pole position, races in italics indicate fastest race lap)

==== Barber Dodge Pro Series ====
Year	1	2	3	4	5	6	7	8	9	10	11	12	Rank	Points
2000	SEB; 15	MIA; 12	NAZ; 21	LRP; 9	DET; 13	CLE; 22	MOH; 17	ROA; 11	VAN; 9	LS; 11	RAT; 12	HMS; 18	**15th**	**36**
2001	SEB; 9	PIR; 6	LRP1; 9	LRP2; 9	DET; 7	CLE; 3	TOR; 6	CHI; 13	MOH; 7	ROA; 11	VAN; 16	LS; 6	**6th**	**91**
2002	SEB; 9	LRP; 2	LAG; 7	POR; 6	TOR; 3	CLE; 3	VAN; 5	MOH; 1	ROA; 10	MTL; 8			**3rd**	**117**

==== Atlantic Championship ====
Year	Team	1	2	3	4	5	6	7	8	9	10	11	12	Rank	Points
2003	Brooks Associates Racing	MTY	LBH	MIL	LS	POR	CLE	TOR	TRR	MOH; 12	MTL	DEN; 10	MIA; 14	**17th**	**12**
