= 2004 Atlantic Championship =

2004 Toyota Atlantic Championship season
- Toyota Atlantic Championship Presented by Yokohama

Season
- Races: 12
- Start date: April 18th
- End date: September 12th

Awards
- Drivers' champion: (United States) Jon Fogarty

The 2004 Toyota Atlantic Championship season was contested over 12 rounds. 11 different teams and 24 different drivers competed. In this one-make formula all drivers had to utilize Swift chassis and Toyota engines. This season also saw a C2-class running older Swift chassis and Toyota engines. In C2-class five different drivers competed, but none of them for the whole season. The Toyota Atlantic Championship Presented by Yokohama Drivers' Champion was Jon Fogarty driving for Pacific Coast Motorsports.´

This season was promoted by Champ Car, which bought CART, and the scoring system was changed.

All teams used the same chassis/engine combination, the Swift 014.a-Toyota.

== Teams and drivers ==
Team	No	Drivers	Races
Class 1
Jensen MotorSport	2	(Canada) Eric Jensen	1, 6–7, 9–10
Jensen MotorSport	2	(Canada) Chris Souliotis	8
Jensen MotorSport	2	(United States) Adam Pecorari	11–12
Jensen MotorSport	7	(Belgium) David Sterckx	1
Jensen MotorSport	7	(Canada) Eric Jensen	8
Polestar Racing Group	3	(Canada) Philip Fayer	1–2, 4–8, 11–12
Polestar Racing Group	3	(United States) Joey Hand	12
Polestar Racing Group	4	(United States) Rocky Moran Jr.	1–5
Polestar Racing Group	4	(Denmark) Ronnie Bremer	All
P-1 Racing	5	(United States) Alfred Unser	1
Brooks Associates Racing	6	(Estonia) Tõnis Kasemets	1, 4–6, 9, 12
Brooks Associates Racing	12	(Denmark) Ronnie Bremer	1
Brooks Associates Racing	10	(Denmark) Ronnie Bremer	2–5
Brooks Associates Racing	10	(United States) Alfred Unser	9–11
Brooks Associates Racing	10	(United States) Aaron Justus	10
Brooks Associates Racing	10	(Australia) Daniel Pappas	12
Transnet Racing	8	(United States) Jonathan Bomarito	1–7
Transnet Racing	9	(Venezuela) Alex Garcia	1–6
Lynx Racing	15	(Australia) Josh Hunt	All
Lynx Racing	19	(United States) Bryan Sellers	All
Dyson Racing	16	(United States) Chris Dyson	4–5
Rahal-Letterman Racing	24	(United States) Danica Patrick	All
Rahal-Letterman Racing	25	(United States) Chris Festa	All
Sierra Sierra Racing	27	(Canada) Andrew Ranger	All
Sierra Sierra Racing	28	(United Kingdom) Ryan Dalziel	All
The Room Store	49	(United States) Dan Selznick	1, 11
Pacific Coast Motorsports	69	(United States) Alex Figge	All
Pacific Coast Motorsports	96	(United States) Jon Fogarty	All
Class 2
Jensen MotorSport	23	(United States) Tom Nastasi	1, 11
Olsson Engineering	34	(United States) Tony Loniewski	1, 4–5, 9, 11
Binder Racing	65	(United States) Justin Sofio	1
Binder Racing	65	(Canada) Cam Binder	8–12
Comprent Motorsports	66	(United States) Rich Zober	11

== Schedule ==
Rd	Date	Race name	Track	Location
1	April 18	(United States) 2004 Atlantic Grand Prix of Long Beach	Streets of Long Beach	Long Beach, California
2	May 23	(Mexico) 2004 Atlantic Grand Prix of Monterrey	Fundidora Park	Monterrey, Mexico
3	June 5	(United States) 2004 Argent Mortgage Toyota Atlantic Championship of Milwaukee	Milwaukee Mile	West Allis, Wisconsin
4	June 19	(United States) 2004 Argent Mortgage Toyota Atlantic Championship of Portland	Portland International Raceway	Portland, Oregon
5	June 20	(United States) 2004 Argent Mortgage Toyota Atlantic Championship of Portland	Portland International Raceway	Portland, Oregon
6	July 3	(United States) 2004 Atlantic Grand Prix of Cleveland	Cleveland Burke Lakefront Airport	Cleveland, Ohio
7	July 11	(Canada) 2004 Atlantic Grand Prix of Toronto	Exhibition Place	Toronto, Ontario
8	July 25	(Canada) 2004 Atlantic Grand Prix of Vancouver	Concord Pacific Place	Vancouver, British Columbia
9	August 8	(United States) 2004 Argent Mortgage Toyota Atlantic Championship of Road America	Road America	Elkhart Lake, Wisconsin
10	August 15	(United States) 2004 Atlantic Grand Prix of Denver	Streets of Denver	Denver, Colorado
11	August 29	(Canada) 2004 Atlantic Grand Prix of Montréal	Circuit Gilles Villeneuve	Montreal, Quebec
12	September 12	(United States) 2004 Argent Mortgage Toyota Atlantic Grand Prix of Monterey	Mazda Raceway Laguna Seca	Monterey, California

== Race results ==
Rd	Race name	Pole Position	Fastest Lap	Race winner		Class 2 Winner
Rd	Race name	Pole Position	Fastest Lap	Winning driver	Winning team	Class 2 Winner
1	Streets of Long Beach	(United Kingdom) Ryan Dalziel	(United Kingdom) Ryan Dalziel	(United Kingdom) Ryan Dalziel	Sierra Sierra Racing	(United States) Justin Sofio
2	Fundidora Park	(United Kingdom) Ryan Dalziel	(United Kingdom) Ryan Dalziel	(United States) Alex Figge	Pacific Coast Motorsports	No winner
3	Milwaukee Mile	(United States) Jon Fogarty	(United States) Jon Fogarty	(United States) Jon Fogarty	Pacific Coast Motorsports	No winner
4	Portland International Raceway	(United States) Jon Fogarty	(United States) Jon Fogarty	(United States) Jon Fogarty	Pacific Coast Motorsports	No winner
5	Portland International Raceway	(United States) Danica Patrick	(United States) Jon Fogarty	(United States) Jon Fogarty	Pacific Coast Motorsports	(United States) Tony Loniewski
6	Cleveland Burke Lakefront Airport	(United Kingdom) Ryan Dalziel	(United Kingdom) Ryan Dalziel	(United Kingdom) Ryan Dalziel	Sierra Sierra Racing	No winner
7	Exhibition Place	(United States) Jon Fogarty	(United States) Jon Fogarty	(United States) Jon Fogarty	Pacific Coast Motorsports	No winner
8	Concord Pacific Place	(United Kingdom) Ryan Dalziel	(United Kingdom) Ryan Dalziel	(United Kingdom) Ryan Dalziel	Sierra Sierra Racing	No winner
9	Road America	(United Kingdom) Ryan Dalziel	(Estonia) Tõnis Kasemets	(United Kingdom) Ryan Dalziel	Sierra Sierra Racing	(United States) Tony Loniewski
10	Streets of Denver	(United States) Jon Fogarty	(United States) Danica Patrick	(Denmark) Ronnie Bremer	Polestar Racing Group	(Canada) Cam Binder
11	Circuit Gilles Villeneuve	(United States) Jon Fogarty	(United Kingdom) Ryan Dalziel	(United States) Jon Fogarty	Pacific Coast Motorsports	(Canada) Cam Binder
12	Mazda Raceway Laguna Seca	(United States) Jon Fogarty	(United States) Alex Figge	(United States) Jon Fogarty	Pacific Coast Motorsports	(Canada) Cam Binder

== Championship standings ==
=== Drivers' Championship ===
Scoring system

Position	**1st**	**2nd**	**3rd**	**4th**	**5th**	**6th**	**7th**	**8th**	**9th**	**10th**	**11th**	**12th**	**13th**	**14th**	**15th**	**16th**	**17th**	**18th**	**19th**	**20th**
Points	31	27	25	23	21	19	17	15	13	11	10	9	8	7	6	5	4	3	2	1

- The fastest driver in each of the qualifying sessions was awarded one additional point.
- The driver who set the fastest lap in a race was awarded one additional point
- The driver that gained the most positions from his starting spot was awarded one additional point.

Pos	Driver	LBH	MTY	MIL	POR		CLE	TOR	VAN	ROA	DEN	MTL	LAG	Pts
Class 1
1	(United States) Jon Fogarty	19	6	**1**	**1**	1	4	**1**	2	2	**6**	**1**	**1**	327
2	(United Kingdom) Ryan Dalziel	**1**	**8**	10	5	2	**1**	6	**1**	**1**	2	2	6	309
3	(United States) Danica Patrick	5	3	4	2	**7**	3	4	4	4↑	5	4	8	269
4	(Canada) Andrew Ranger	2	13	3↑	3	4	12	2↑	7	3	4	5	3	257
5	(Denmark) Ronnie Bremer	4	4	2	8	9	6	3	3	13	1↑	13	2↑	251
6	(United States) Bryan Sellers	3	12	5	7	5	2↑	5	11	6	3	6	10	227
7	(United States) Alex Figge	17	1	12	6	16	7	7	5	14	8	3	4	201
8	(United States) Chris Festa	11	7	7	10	6↑	14	8	13	8	7	7	7	172
9	(United States) Jonathan Bomarito	6	5	8	4	3	5	11						134
10	(Australia) Josh Hunt	9	10	9	15	11	13	12	12	7	9	16	12	127
11	(United States) Rocky Moran Jr.	7	2↑	6	9	8								92
12	(Canada) Philip Fayer	12	11		13	13	10	9	6↑			14	Wth	88
13	(Estonia) Tõnis Kasemets	18			11	12	9			5			5	81
14	(Venezuela) Alex Garcia	8	9	11	14	10	8							71
15	(Canada) Eric Jensen	20					11	10	8	10	11			61
16	(United States) Alfred Unser	21								9	10	8		41*
17	(United States) Adam Pecorari											9	14	21
18	(United States) Dan Selznick	15										10		19
19	(United States) Chris Dyson				12↑	14								17
20	(Canada) Chris Souliotis								9					13
21	(United States) Joey Hand												9	13
22	(Australia) Daniel Pappas												11	10
23	(Belgium) David Sterckx	10↑												6*
	(United States) Aaron Justus										Wth			-
Class 2
1	(Canada) Cam Binder								10	12	12	11	13	154
2	(United States) Tony Loniewski	16			16	15				11		17		144
3	(United States) Tom Nastasi	14										15		54
4	(United States) Justin Sofio	13												31
5	(United States) Rich Zober											12		27
Pos	Driver	LBH	MTY	MIL	POR		CLE	TOR	VAN	ROA	DEN	MTL	LAG	Pts

Color	Result
Gold	Winner
Silver	2nd place
Bronze	3rd place
Green	4th & 5th place
Light Blue	6th–10th place
Dark Blue	Finished (Outside Top 10)
Purple	Did not finish
Red	Did not qualify (DNQ)
Brown	Withdrawn (Wth)
Black	Disqualified (DSQ)
White	Did Not Start (DNS)
White	Race abandoned (C)
Blank	Did not participate

**In-line notation**
**Bold**	Pole position
Italics	Ran fastest race lap
*	Led race laps
↑	Improved the most places
**(RY)**	Rookie of the Year
**(R)**	Rookie

- For the Long Beach Race, Alfred Unser and David Sterckx were only awarded with half points, as they ran non-parity engines.

=== Complete Overview ===
first column of every race	10	= grid position

second column of every race	10	= race result

R19=retired, but classified NS=did not start (8)=place after practice, but grid position not held free

**Place**	**Name**	**Country**	**Team**	(United States)		(Mexico)		(United States)		(United States)		(United States)		(United States)		(Canada)		(Canada)		(United States)		(United States)		(Canada)		(United States)
1	Jon Fogarty	United States	Pacific Coast Motorsports	2	R19	4	6	1	1	1	1	2	1	4	4	1	1	2	2	2	2	1	6	1	1	1	1
2	Ryan Dalziel	United Kingdom	Sierra Sierra Racing	1	1	1	8	3	R10	7	5	3	2	1	1	6	6	1	1	1	1	3	2	2	2	2	6
3	Danica Patrick	United States	Team Rahal/Letterman	6	5	3	3	6	4	3	2	1	7	8	3	5	4	6	4	6	4	6	5	3	4	4	8
4	Andrew Ranger	Canada	Sierra Sierra Racing	5	2	5	R13	7	3	2	3	6	4	2	12	4	2	5	7	3	3	7	4	7	5	3	3
5	Ronnie Bremer	Denmark	Brooks Associates Racing	7	4	10	4	5	2	8	8	8	9
5	Ronnie Bremer	Denmark	Polestar Motor Racing											3	6	3	3	4	3	4	R13	5	1	6	R13	5	2
6	Bryan Sellers	United States	Lynx Racing	4	3	2	12	4	5	5	7	4	5	10	2	2	5	3	R11	8	6	4	3	5	6	7	10
7	Alex Figge	United States	Pacific Coast Motorsports	3	R17	6	1	2	R12	6	6	7	R16	5	7	7	7	7	5	5	R14	2	8	4	3	6	4
8	Chris Festa	United States	Team Rahal/Letterman	10	11	11	7	9	7	10	10	9	6	12	R14	8	8	8	R13	10	8	8	7	8	7	9	7
9	Jonathan Bomarito	United States	Transnet Racing	11	6	7	5	11	8	4	4	5	3	6	5	9	R11	-	-	-	-	-	-	-	-	-	-
10	Josh Hunt	Australia	Lynx Racing	15	9	8	10	12	9	12	R15	10	11	9	13	10	R12	9	R12	9	7	10	9	9	R16	11	12
11	Rocky Moran Jr.	United States	Polestar Motor Racing	9	7	9	2	8	6	11	9	11	8	-	-	-	-	-	-	-	-	-	-	-	-	-	-
12	Philip Fayer	Canada	Polestar Motor Racing	14	12	13	11	-	-	14	13	14	13	13	10	11	9	10	6	-	-	-	-	10	R14	12	NS
13	Tõnis Kasemets	Estonia	Brooks Associates Racing	8	R18	-	-	-	-	13	11	12	12	7	9	-	-	-	-	7	5	-	-	-	-	8	5
14	Alex García	Venezuela	Transnet Racing	13	8	12	9	10	R11	9	R14	13	10	11	8	-	-	-	-	-	-	-	-	-	-	-	-
15	Eric Jensen	Canada	Jensen Motorsport	12	R20	-	-	-	-	-	-	-	-	14	11	12	10	11	8	12	10	9	11	-	-	-	-
16	Alfred Unser	United States	P-1 Racing	19	R21	-	-	-	-	-	-	-	-	-	-	-	-	-	-
16	Alfred Unser	United States	Brooks Associates Racing																	11	9	12	10	11	8	-	-
17	Adam Pecorari	United States	Jensen Motorsport	-	-	-	-	-	-	-	-	-	-	-	-	-	-	-	-	-	-	-	-	12	9	10	14
18	Dan Selznick	United States	Room Store	16	R15	-	-	-	-	-	-	-	-	-	-	-	-	-	-	-	-	-	-	14	10	-	-
19	Chris Dyson	United States	Dyson Racing	-	-	-	-	-	-	16	12	16	14	-	-	-	-	-	-	-	-	-	-	-	-	-	-
20	Chris Souliotis	Canada	Jensen Motorsport	-	-	-	-	-	-	-	-	-	-	-	-	-	-	13	9	-	-	-	-	-	-	-	-
	Joey Hand	United States	Polestar Motor Racing	-	-	-	-	-	-	-	-	-	-	-	-	-	-	-	-	-	-	-	-	-	-	14	9
22	Daniel Pappas	Australia	Brooks Associates Racing	-	-	-	-	-	-	-	-	-	-	-	-	-	-	-	-	-	-	-	-	-	-	13	11
23	David Sterckx	Belgium	Jensen Motorsport	18	10	-	-	-	-	-	-	-	-	-	-	-	-	-	-	-	-	-	-	-	-	-	-
-	Aaron Justus	United States	Brooks Associates Racing	-	-	-	-	-	-	-	-	-	-	-	-	-	-	-	-	-	-	(8)	NS	-	-	-	-
**C2-Class**				(United States)		(Mexico)		(United States)		(United States)		(United States)		(United States)		(Canada)		(Canada)		(United States)		(United States)		(Canada)		(United States)
1	Cam Binder	Canada	Binder Racing	-	-	-	-	-	-	-	-	-	-	-	-	-	-	12	R10	14	12	11	12	16	11	14	13
2	Tony Loniewski	United States	Olsson Engineering	21	R16	-	-	-	-	15	R16	15	15	-	-	-	-	-	-	13	11	-	-	15	R17	-	-
3	Tom Nastasi	United States	Jensen Motorsport	17	14	-	-	-	-	-	-	-	-	-	-	-	-	-	-	-	-	-	-	13	R15	-	-
4	Justin Sofio	United States	Binder Racing	20	13	-	-	-	-	-	-	-	-	-	-	-	-	-	-	-	-	-	-	-	-	-	-
5	Rich Zober	United States	Comprent Motorsports	-	-	-	-	-	-	-	-	-	-	-	-	-	-	-	-	-	-	-	-	17	12	-	-

== See also ==
- 2004 Champ Car season
- 2004 Indianapolis 500
- 2004 IndyCar Series season
- 2004 Infiniti Pro Series season

Preceded by 2003 Atlantic Championship season	2004 Toyota Atlantic season	Succeeded by 2005 Atlantic Championship season
