= 2005 Atlantic Championship =

American open-wheel racing season

2005 Toyota Atlantic Championship season
- Toyota Atlantic Championship Presented by Yokohama

Season
- Races: 12
- Start date: April 10th
- End date: August 28th

Awards
- Drivers' champion: (Netherlands) Charles Zwolsman Jr.

The 2005 Toyota Atlantic Championship season was contested over 12 rounds. 14 different teams and 27 different drivers competed. In this one-make formula all drivers had to utilize Swift chassis and Toyota engines. This season also saw a C2-class running older Swift chassis and Toyota engines. In C2-class 12 different drivers competed, but none of them for the whole season. The Toyota Atlantic Championship Presented by Yokohama Drivers' Champion was Charles Zwolsman Jr. driving for Condor Motorsports.

== Teams and drivers ==
Team	No	Drivers	Races
Class 1
Jensen MotorSport	2	(United States) Adam Pecorari	2
Jensen MotorSport	2	(Brazil) Leonardo Maia	5–6
Jensen MotorSport	2	(Canada) Eric Jensen	7–8, 12
Jensen MotorSport	2	(United States) Ryan Spencer-Smith	9–10
Jensen MotorSport	2	(United States) Christopher Prey	11
Jensen MotorSport	22	(United States) Grant Ryley	9
Polestar Racing Group	3	(Canada) Antoine Bessette	All
Polestar Racing Group	12	(United Kingdom) Katherine Legge	All
Team Tonis	6	(Estonia) Tõnis Kasemets	All
US RaceTronics	7	(Mexico) David Martínez	2–12
Brooks Associates Racing	8	(Germany) Andreas Wirth	1–10
Brooks Associates Racing	10	(Brazil) Fernando Rees	1
Brooks Associates Racing	10	(Mexico) Memo Rojas	2
Brooks Associates Racing	10	(United States) Al Unser III	3–12
Condor Motorsports	11	(Netherlands) Charles Zwolsman Jr.	All
Condor Motorsports	41	(United States) Phil Giebler	9
Norcold Dyson Racing	16	(United States) Chris Dyson	1, 3–6
McAtee Motorsports	19	(United States) Brian McAtee	1, 3–4, 9–10
McAtee Motorsports	24	(United States) Kyle Kelley	1–4, 9–12
Blackforest Motorsports	23	(United States) Tom Nastasi	5–7
PR1 Motorsports	27	(United States) Alan Sciuto	9–11
The Room Store	49	(United States) Dan Selznick	1, 3–6, 9–10, 12
Armsup Motorsports	54	(Canada) Daniel Di Leo	11
Armsup Motorsports	55	(United States) Chris Menninga	11
Bite Racing	56	(Canada) Chris Souliotis	3–12
Blackforest Motorsports	96	(United States) Ben Johnston	1–2
Class 2
P-1 Racing	5	(Canada) Rocky Moran Jr.	1
Team Tonis	9	(United States) Dan Cobb	1–10
Team Tonis	9	(United States) Bobby Wilson	11
Binder Racing	15	(United States) Justin Sofio	1
Mathiasen Motorsports	15	(United States) Justin Sofio	3–10
RJS Motorsports	18	(United States) Bob Siska	1, 3–12
Blackjack Racing	21	(United States) Roger Glover	3–4, 8
Blackforest Motorsports	23	(United States) Tom Nastasi	1–2
Condor Motorsports	31	(Canada) Tim Hauraney	3–4, 7
US RaceTronics	32	(United States) Roby Feazell	1
Atkins Racing	48	(United States) Lee Atkins	1, 3–4, 9–12
Bite Racing	63	(Canada) Daryl Leiski	3–12
Comprent Motorsports	66	(United States) Rich Zober	5–6
Ishikawa Racing	71	(United States) Mark Ishikawa	1–4, 9

== Schedule ==
Rd	Date	Race name	Track	Location
1	April 10	(United States) 2005 Atlantic Grand Prix of Long Beach	Streets of Long Beach	Long Beach, California
2	May 22	(Mexico) 2005 Atlantic Grand Prix of Monterrey	Fundidora Park	Monterrey, Mexico
3	June 18	(United States) 2005 BOSPoker.com Atlantic Grand Prix of Portland	Portland International Raceway	Portland, Oregon
4	June 19	(United States) 2005 BOSPoker.com Atlantic Grand Prix of Portland	Portland International Raceway	Portland, Oregon
5	June 25	(United States) 2005 BOSPoker.com Atlantic Grand Prix of Cleveland	Cleveland Burke Lakefront Airport	Cleveland, Ohio
6	June 26	(United States) 2005 BOSPoker.com Atlantic Grand Prix of Cleveland	Cleveland Burke Lakefront Airport	Cleveland, Ohio
7	July 10	(Canada) 2005 Atlantic Grand Prix of Toronto	Exhibition Place	Toronto, Ontario
8	July 17	(Canada) 2005 NAPA Auto Parts Presents the Toyota Atlantic Challenge	Edmonton City Centre Airport	Edmonton, Alberta
9	July 31	(United States) 2005 Atlantic Grand Prix of San Jose	Streets of San Jose	San Jose, California
10	August 14	(United States) 2005 BOSPoker.com Toyota Atlantic Grand Prix of Denver	Streets of Denver	Denver, Colorado
11	August 21	(United States) 2005 BOSPoker.com Toyota Atlantic Grand Prix of Road America	Road America	Elkhart Lake, Wisconsin
12	August 28	(Canada) 2005 Atlantic Grand Prix of Montréal	Circuit Gilles Villeneuve	Montreal, Quebec

== Race results ==
Rd	Race name	Pole Position	Fastest Lap	Race winner		Class 2 Winner
Rd	Race name	Pole Position	Fastest Lap	Winning driver	Winning team	Class 2 Winner
1	Streets of Long Beach	(Canada) Antoine Bessette	(Canada) Antoine Bessette	(United Kingdom) Katherine Legge	Polestar Racing Group	(United States) Justin Sofio
2	Fundidora Park	(Netherlands) Charles Zwolsman Jr.	(Netherlands) Charles Zwolsman Jr.	(Netherlands) Charles Zwolsman Jr.	Condor Motorsports	(United States) Tom Nastasi
3	Portland International Raceway	(Germany) Andreas Wirth	(Netherlands) Charles Zwolsman Jr.	(Estonia) Tõnis Kasemets	Team Tonis	(United States) Justin Sofio
4	Portland International Raceway	(Estonia) Tõnis Kasemets	(Estonia) Tõnis Kasemets	(Estonia) Tõnis Kasemets	Team Tonis	(United States) Lee Atkins
5	Cleveland Burke Lakefront Airport	(Estonia) Tõnis Kasemets	(Estonia) Tõnis Kasemets	(Netherlands) Charles Zwolsman Jr.	Condor Motorsports	(United States) Justin Sofio
6	Cleveland Burke Lakefront Airport	(Netherlands) Charles Zwolsman Jr.	(Netherlands) Charles Zwolsman Jr.	(Netherlands) Charles Zwolsman Jr.	Condor Motorsports	(United States) Dan Cobb
7	Exhibition Place	(Netherlands) Charles Zwolsman Jr.	(Netherlands) Charles Zwolsman Jr.	(Canada) Antoine Bessette	Polestar Racing Group	(United States) Justin Sofio
8	Edmonton City Centre Airport	(Netherlands) Charles Zwolsman Jr.	(Netherlands) Charles Zwolsman Jr.	(United Kingdom) Katherine Legge	Polestar Racing Group	(United States) Justin Sofio
9	Streets of San Jose	(Netherlands) Charles Zwolsman Jr.	(Mexico) David Martínez	(United Kingdom) Katherine Legge	Polestar Racing Group	(United States) Justin Sofio
10	Streets of Denver	(United States) Alan Sciuto	(Estonia) Tõnis Kasemets	(Germany) Andreas Wirth	Brooks Associates Racing	(United States) Justin Sofio
11	Road America	(Estonia) Tõnis Kasemets	(Estonia) Tõnis Kasemets	(Estonia) Tõnis Kasemets	Team Tonis	(Canada) Daryl Leiski
12	Circuit Gilles Villeneuve	(Mexico) David Martínez	(Mexico) David Martínez	(Canada) Antoine Bessette	Polestar Racing Group	(Canada) Daryl Leiski

== Championship standings ==
=== Drivers' Championship ===
Scoring system

Position	**1st**	**2nd**	**3rd**	**4th**	**5th**	**6th**	**7th**	**8th**	**9th**	**10th**	**11th**	**12th**	**13th**	**14th**	**15th**	**16th**	**17th**	**18th**	**19th**	**20th**
Points	31	27	25	23	21	19	17	15	13	11	10	9	8	7	6	5	4	3	2	1

- The fastest driver in a qualifying session was awarded one additional point. Only one qualifying session was held on doubleheader weekends.
- The driver who set the fastest lap in a race was awarded one additional point
- The driver that gained the most positions from his starting spot was awarded one additional point.

Pos	Driver	LBH	MTY	POR		CLE		TOR	EDM	SJO	DEN	ROA	MTL	Pts
Class 1
1	(Netherlands) Charles Zwolsman Jr.	3	**1**	2	8	1	**1**	**12**	**2**	**3**	3	6	6	306
2	(Estonia) Tõnis Kasemets	15	2	1	**1**	**2**	4	8	5	19	8	**1**	2	289
3	(United Kingdom) Katherine Legge	1	5	9	3	16	5	6	1	1	17	2	4	267
4	(Canada) Antoine Bessette	**2**	4	5	5	14	2	1	4	15	4	13	1	267
5	(Mexico) David Martínez		3	6	4	15	8	2	8	2	5	3	**3**	238
6	(Germany) Andreas Wirth	17	8	**3**	2	3	3	3	3	5	1			234
7	(United States) Al Unser III			7	6	4	7	4	6	6	7	4	5	198
8	(United States) Kyle Kelley	8	6	4	DSQ					18	6	5	13	122
9	(Canada) Chris Souliotis			19	15	12	14	13	12	13	13	10	9	115
10	(United States) Dan Selznick	7		10	18	17	10			10	9		7	106
11	(United States) Chris Dyson	4		8	7	5	6							95
12	(United States) Alan Sciuto									4	**2**	7		69
13	(United States) Brian McAtee	14		15	13					20	15			56
14	(Canada) Eric Jensen							5	7				8	54
15	(United States) Tom Nastasi					6	16	11						44
16	(Brazil) Leonardo Maia					11	9							30
17	(United States) Ryan Spencer-Smith									12	18			19
18	(Mexico) Memo Rojas		7											17
19	(United States) Grant Ryley									7				17
20	(United States) Phil Giebler									8				15
21	(Canada) Daniel Di Leo											8		15
22	(United States) Chris Menninga											9		13
23	(United States) Ben Johnston	DNS	12											13
24	(Brazil) Fernando Rees	16												13
25	(United States) Adam Pecorari		13											11
26	(United States) Christopher Prey											15		9
Class 2
1	(United States) Justin Sofio	5		11	10	7	15	7	9	9	10			273
2	(Canada) Daryl Leiski			14	11	13	12	9	13	17	11	11	10	263
3	(United States) Bob Siska	11		13	16	10	17	10	14	11	14	14	11	257
4	(United States) Dan Cobb	6	10	18	19	9	11	14	10	14	16			240
5	(United States) Lee Atkins	12		16	9					Wth	12	12	12	153
6	(United States) Mark Ishikawa	9	11	DNS	17					16				90
7	(Canada) Tim Hauraney			12	12			15						71
8	(United States) Roger Glover			17	14				11					65
9	(United States) Rich Zober					8	13							52
10	(United States) Tom Nastasi	DNS	9											33
11	(United States) Rocky Moran Jr.	10												25
12	(United States) Roby Feazell	13												17
Pos	Driver	LBH	MTY	POR		CLE		TOR	EDM	SJO	DEN	ROA	MTL	Pts

Color	Result
Gold	Winner
Silver	2nd place
Bronze	3rd place
Green	4th & 5th place
Light Blue	6th–10th place
Dark Blue	Finished (Outside Top 10)
Purple	Did not finish
Red	Did not qualify (DNQ)
Brown	Withdrawn (Wth)
Black	Disqualified (DSQ)
White	Did Not Start (DNS)
White	Race abandoned (C)
Blank	Did not participate

**In-line notation**
**Bold**	Pole position
Italics	Ran fastest race lap
*	Led race laps
↑	Improved the most places
**(RY)**	Rookie of the Year
**(R)**	Rookie

== See also ==
- 2005 Champ Car season
- 2005 Indianapolis 500
- 2005 IndyCar Series season
- 2005 Infiniti Pro Series season

Preceded by 2004 Toyota Atlantic Championship season	2005 Toyota Atlantic season	Succeeded by 2006 Champ Car Atlantic Season
