= 2006 Atlantic Championship =

2006 Champ Car Atlantic season
- Yokohama Presents the Champ Car Atlantic Championship Powered by Mazda

Season
- Races: 12
- Start date: April 9
- End date: September 2

Awards
- Drivers' champion: (France) Simon Pagenaud
- Teams' champion: (United States) Forsythe Championship Racing
- Rookie of the Year: (France) Simon Pagenaud

The 2006 Champ Car Atlantic season was the 33rd season of the Champ Car Atlantic Championship. It began April 9 at Long Beach and concluded September 24 at Road America. The Yokohama Presents the Champ Car Atlantic Championship Powered by Mazda Drivers' Champion was Simon Pagenaud driving for Team Australia.

Engines now were supllied my Mazda, instead of Toyota, and chassis was upgraded from the Swift 014.a to the Swift 016.a. Also, there was no more a Class C2 championship being contested alongside the main championship.

== Teams and drivers ==
Team	No	Drivers	Races
(United States) Condor Motorsports	1	(Brazil) Danilo Dirani (R)	All
(Canada) Jensen MotorSport	2	(United Kingdom) Tim Bridgman (R)	All
(Canada) Jensen MotorSport	22	(United States) Steve Ott (R)	2, 4-6
(Canada) Jensen MotorSport	22	(Venezuela) Ricardo Vassmer (R)	9-10
(United States) Forsythe Racing	3	(Canada) James Hinchcliffe (R)	All
(United States) Forsythe Racing	7	(Brazil) Leonardo Maia (R)	All
(United States) Forsythe Racing	33	(France) Richard Philippe (R)	All
(United States) Forsythe Racing	37	(Germany) Andreas Wirth	All
(United States) US RaceTronics	4	(Mexico) David Martínez	All
Team Australia	5	(Australia) James Davison (R)	1-10
Team Australia	5	(Australia) Michael Patrizi (R)	11-12
Team Australia	15	(France) Simon Pagenaud (R)	All
(United States) Sierra Sierra Enterprises	6	(Brazil) Raphael Matos (R)	All
(United States) Brooks Associates Racing	8	(Venezuela) Luis Schiavo (R)	1-3
(United States) Brooks Associates Racing	8	(Mexico) Carlos Mastretta	3-9
(United States) Brooks Associates Racing	8	(Canada) Antoine Bessette	11
(United States) Brooks Associates Racing	10	(Austria) Norbert Siedler (R)	1-3
(United States) Brooks Associates Racing	10	(Brazil) Alex Sperafico (R)	4-12
(United States) McAtee Motorsports	9	(United States) Kyle Kelley	1, 4
(United States) McAtee Motorsports	19	(United States) Brian McAtee	1, 9-10
(United States) McAtee Motorsports	19	(United States) Brian Thienes	11-12
(United States) Polestar Racing Group	12	(United States) Alan Sciuto (R)	All
(United States) Polestar Racing Group	21	(United States) Alex Barron	1-10
(United States) Polestar Racing Group	21	(Denmark) Ronnie Bremer	11
(United States) Polestar Racing Group	21	(Canada) Antoine Bessette	12
(United States) Gelles Racing	14	(South Africa) Stephen Simpson (R)	1-3
(United States) Gelles Racing	14	(Canada) Antoine Bessette	4
(United States) Gelles Racing	14	(United States) Colin Fleming (R)	9-12
(United States) Gelles Racing	28	(United States) Robbie Pecorari (R)	All
(United States) Gelles Racing	31	(United States) Casey Neal (R)	11
(United States) Gelles Racing	42	(United States) Phil Giebler (R)	9
(United States) Transnet Racing	16	(United States) Charles Hall	1-3
(United States) Transnet Racing	16	(Venezuela) Alex García	4-6
(United States) Transnet Racing	17	(Australia) Barton Mawer	2-4
(United States) Mi-Jack Conquest Racing	18	(United States) Graham Rahal (R)	All
(United States) Mi-Jack Conquest Racing	30	(United States) Al Unser III	1-3
(United States) Mi-Jack Conquest Racing	30	(United Kingdom) Ryan Lewis (R)	4-12
(United States) PR1 Motorsports	23	(United States) Jonathan Bomarito	All
(United States) PR1 Motorsports	32	(Canada) Mike Forest (R)	1, 7-8, 10, 12
(United States) NCDL Tech	25	(United States) Ryan Spencer-Smith (R)	1-2
(United States) Mathiasen Motorsports	26	(United States) Justin Sofio	All
(United States) Newman Wachs Racing	34	(United States) Joe D'Agostino (R)	All
(United States) Newman Wachs Racing	35	(New Zealand) Daniel Gaunt (R)	1-6
(United States) Newman Wachs Racing	35	(United States) Steve Ott (R)	7-11
(United States) Newman Wachs Racing	36	(United States) J. R. Hildebrand (R)	12
(United States) The Room Store	49	(United States) Dan Selznick	1-2, 10
(Canada) Bite Racing	55	(United States) Duncan Ende (R)	1, 4-7
(Canada) Bite Racing	56	(Canada) Chris Souliotis	2-3

== Schedule ==
Rd	Date	Race name	Track	Location
1	April 9	(United States) 2006 Imperial Capital Bank Atlantic Race	Streets of Long Beach	Long Beach, California
2	May 13	(United States) 2006 Fast Trac 100	Streets of Houston	Houston, Texas
3	May 21	(Mexico) 2006 Atlantic Grand Prix of Monterrey	Fundidora Park	Monterrey, Mexico
4	June 18	(United States) 2006 Trinity Carpet 100K	Portland International Raceway	Portland, Oregon
5	June 24	(United States) 2006 Gehl Atlantic Championship of Cleveland	Cleveland Burke Lakefront Airport	Cleveland, Ohio
6	June 25	(United States) 2006 Gehl Atlantic Championship of Cleveland	Cleveland Burke Lakefront Airport	Cleveland, Ohio
7	July 9	(Canada) 2006 Atlantic Grand Prix of Toronto	Exhibition Place	Toronto, Ontario
8	July 23	(Canada) 2006 Atlantic Grand Prix of Edmonton	Edmonton City Centre Airport	Edmonton, Alberta
9	July 30	(United States) 2006 Atlantic Grand Prix of San José	Streets of San Jose	San Jose, California
10	August 13	(United States) 2006 Atlantic Grand Prix of Denver	Streets of Denver	Denver, Colorado
11	August 27	(Canada) 2006 Atlantic Grand Prix of Montréal	Circuit Gilles Villeneuve	Montreal, Quebec
12	September 24	(United States) 2006 Gehl Championship Finale	Road America	Elkhart Lake, Wisconsin

== Race results ==
Rd	Race Name	Pole position	Fastest lap	Race winner	
Rd	Race Name	Pole position	Fastest lap	Driver	Team
1	Streets of Long Beach	(Germany) Andreas Wirth	(Brazil) Raphael Matos	(Germany) Andreas Wirth	(United States) Forsythe Championship Racing
2	Streets of Houston	(Brazil) Raphael Matos	(United States) Jonathan Bomarito	(Germany) Andreas Wirth	(United States) Forsythe Championship Racing
3	Fundidora Park	(United States) Graham Rahal	(United States) Graham Rahal	(United States) Graham Rahal	(United States) Mi-Jack Conquest Racing
4	Portland International Raceway	(United States) Graham Rahal	(United States) Joe D'Agostino	(Canada) James Hinchcliffe	(United States) Forsythe Championship Racing
5	Cleveland Burke Lakefront Airport	(Germany) Andreas Wirth	(United States) Graham Rahal	(United States) Graham Rahal	(United States) Mi-Jack Conquest Racing
6	Cleveland Burke Lakefront Airport	(France) Simon Pagenaud	(Germany) Andreas Wirth	(United States) Graham Rahal	(United States) Mi-Jack Conquest Racing
7	Exhibition Place	(United States) Graham Rahal	(United States) Graham Rahal	(United States) Robbie Pecorari	(United States) Gelles Racing
8	Edmonton City Centre Airport	(Brazil) Raphael Matos	(France) Simon Pagenaud	(France) Simon Pagenaud	Team Australia
9	Streets of San Jose	(Brazil) Raphael Matos	(United States) Graham Rahal	(Brazil) Raphael Matos	(United States) Sierra Sierra Enterprises
10	Streets of Denver	(United States) Graham Rahal	(United States) Graham Rahal	(United States) Graham Rahal	(United States) Mi-Jack Conquest Racing
11	Circuit Gilles Villeneuve	(Canada) James Hinchcliffe	(Canada) Antoine Bessette	(United States) Graham Rahal	(United States) Mi-Jack Conquest Racing
12	Road America	(Brazil) Raphael Matos	(Brazil) Raphael Matos	(United States) Jonathan Bomarito	(United States) PR1 Motorsports

== Championship standings ==
=== Drivers' Championship ===
Scoring system

Position	**1st**	**2nd**	**3rd**	**4th**	**5th**	**6th**	**7th**	**8th**	**9th**	**10th**	**11th**	**12th**	**13th**	**14th**	**15th**	**16th**	**17th**	**18th**	**19th**	**20th**
Points	31	27	25	23	21	19	17	15	13	11	10	9	8	7	6	5	4	3	2	1

- The fastest driver in each qualifying session was awarded one additional point.
- The driver who set the fastest lap in a race was awarded one additional point
- The driver that gained the most positions from his starting spot was awarded one additional point.

Pos	Driver	LBH	HOU	MTY	POR	CLE		TOR	EDM	SJO	DEN	MTL	ROA	Pts
1	(France) Simon Pagenaud RY	4	2	2	23	2	**5**	4	1	9	3	2	17	258
2	(United States) Graham Rahal R	5	15	**1**	**27**	1	1	**15**	2	12	**1**	1	20	242
3	(Germany) Andreas Wirth	**1**	1	6	3	**3**	18	16	3	18	5	12	3	227
4	(Brazil) Raphael Matos R	2	**11**	23	6	5	22	9	**20**	**1**	2	7	**2**	205
5	(Mexico) David Martínez	12	8	3	7↑	10	10	8	12	6	10	4	9	179
6	(United States) Jonathan Bomarito	23	3	4	14	4	8	2	6	16	16	15	1	178
7	(Brazil) Danilo Dirani R	6	5	14	5	8	23	14	5	3	8	13	6	178
8	(United States) Alan Sciuto R	10	6	7	4	15	9↑	17	11	15	4	6	8	167
9	(Brazil) Leonardo Maia R	9	9	10	9	7	6	10	17	5	12	5	12	161
10	(Canada) James Hinchcliffe R	3	4	16	1	17	19	6	23	25	7	**3**	16	160
11	(United States) Robbie Pecorari R	7	18	18	15	24	4	1	10	21	6	11	4	147
12	(United States) Joe D'Agostino R	11↑	12	9	24	9	7	7	7	22	18	16	7	123
13	(United Kingdom) Ryan Lewis R				2	19	15	3↑	22	2	24	24	5	110
14	(United States) Alex Barron	8	22	8	16	14	11	5	15	14	11			96
15	(France) Richard Philippe R	28	20	17	21	11	2	18	4	17	20	9	23	86
16	(United Kingdom) Tim Bridgman R	24	19	24	10	12↑	20	19	8	4	21	17↑	18	72
17	(Australia) James Davison R	13	10	21	25	13	13	12	13	7	22			69
18	(United States) Justin Sofio	27	25	19	17	20	16	13	19	8↑	13↑	22	14	54
19	(United States) Steve Ott R		7↑		20	23	3	21	21	20	23	18		48
20	(United States) Colin Fleming R								9	24	9	10	13	45
21	(Mexico) Carlos Mastretta R				13	6	24	20	18	10				42
22	(Brazil) Alex Sperafico R				22	16	12	11	16	23	25	19	11	41
23	(Canada) Mike Forest R	DNS						DNS	14↑		14		10↑	27
24	(New Zealand) Daniel Gaunt R	20	DNS	15	8	22	21							22
25	(South Africa) Stephen Simpson R	25	27	5										21
26	(Australia) Michael Patrizi R											8	15	21
27	(Australia) Barton Mawer R		14	20	11									18
28	(Venezuela) Luis Schiavo R	15	26	11										16
29	(Austria) Norbert Siedler R	18	21	12↑										13
30	(United States) Charles Hall	22	16	13										13
31	(Venezuela) Alex García				18	18	14							13
32	(United States) Brian McAtee	21								13	17			12
33	(United States) Phil Giebler R									11				10
34	(Canada) Antoine Bessette				12							21	21	10
35	(United States) Dan Selznick	17	24								15			10
36	(United States) Kyle Kelley	14			19									9
37	(United States) Duncan Ende R	16			26	21	17	DNS						9
38	(United States) Ryan Spencer-Smith R	26	13											8
39	(Denmark) Ronnie Bremer											14		7
40	(Canada) Chris Souliotis		17	22										4
41	(Venezuela) Ricardo Vassmer R									19	19			4
42	(United States) J. R. Hildebrand R												19	2
43	(United States) Al Unser III	19	23	Wth										2
44	(United States) Brian Thienes R											20	22	1
	(United States) Casey Neal R											23		0
Pos	Driver	LBH	HOU	MTY	POR	CLE		TOR	EDM	SJO	DEN	MTL	ROA	Pts

Color	Result
Gold	Winner
Silver	2nd place
Bronze	3rd place
Green	4th & 5th place
Light Blue	6th–10th place
Dark Blue	Finished (Outside Top 10)
Purple	Did not finish
Red	Did not qualify (DNQ)
Brown	Withdrawn (Wth)
Black	Disqualified (DSQ)
White	Did not start (DNS)
Blank	Did not participate (DNP)
Blank	Not competing

**In-line notation**
**Bold**	Pole position (1 point)
Italics	Ran fastest race lap
↑	Improved the most places
R	Rookie
RY	Rookie of the Year

== See also ==
- 2006 Champ Car season
- 2006 Indianapolis 500
- 2006 IndyCar Series season
- 2006 Indy Pro Series season

Preceded by 2005 Toyota Atlantic Championship season	2006 Champ Car Atlantic season	Succeeded by 2007 Champ Car Atlantic season
