= David Martínez (racing driver) =

Mexican racing driver (born 1981)

- Nationality: Mexico
- Born: December 8, 1981 (age 44) Monterrey, Nuevo León, Mexico

Previous series
- 1991–2002 1996 1997 1999–2001 2002 2002, 05–06, 08 2003 2004 2005–06, 2007–08 2006–2007 2008 2009 2010: Karting; Formula 2 Neon Mexicana; Formula 3000 Mexico; Mexican Formula Three; Formula Renault 2.0 Mexico; Atlantic Championship; Barber Dodge Pro Series; Formula Renault V6 Eurocup; A1 Grand Prix; Champ Car World Series; IndyCar Series; Rolex Sports Car Series; Indy Lights

Championship titles
- 1996 2002: Formula 2 Neon Mexicana; Formula Renault 2.0 Mexico

David Martínez (born December 8, 1981, in Monterrey) is a Mexican racing driver. He holds the record for the best debut ever by a Mexican driver in a premiere open-wheel series (IndyCar, Champ Car World Series, F1) with his ninth place finish at the 2006 Gran Premio Telmex (a record he now shares with Patricio O'Ward, who also finished 9th on debut at the 2018 Indycar Grand Prix of Sonoma).

== Racing career ==
=== Early career in Mexico ===
Starting at the age of seven through his early twenties, Martínez raced in Mexico in karts, Mexican Formula 2/Formula 3000, Formula 3, and Formula Renault 2000 de America. At the age of fourteen, he won his first formula championship (Mexican Formula 2 Neon). In 1997, Martínez was awarded the Rookie of the Year Award in Mexican Marlboro Cup Formula 3000, and in 2002, he won the Mexican Formula Renault 2000. Martínez eventually expanded his racing territory, which included a year in the Barber Dodge Pro Series (2003) winning the first race he participated in (at Fundidora Park in Monterrey, Mexico).

=== Europe and Atlantic Championship (2004-2006) ===
In 2004, Martínez migrated to Europe and produced five top-five results in the Formula Renault V6 Eurocup Series. The 25-year-old missed the first race of the year in the 2005 Champ Car Atlantic Championship but still managed to claim fifth in his rookie season. He finished third in his first race in Monterrey, Mexico, captured his first career pole and scored a total of four podiums and seven top-five finishes. Also during 2005, Martínez contested some rounds of the A1 Grand Prix Series.

In 2006, Martínez returned to Atlantics with the US RaceTronics Team, and repeated his fifth place in the championship despite a challenging season in which he switched teams halfway through the year, but still managed to continue his success on Mexican soil by finishing third at the Monterrey, Mexico event.

=== Champ Car and Indy Lights (2006-present) ===
In 2006, Martínez joined Forsythe Championship Racing in Mexico City to pilot the Lola-Ford-Cosworth in his Champ Car debut. Initially announced to race a third car for the team, he ended up replacing an injured Paul Tracy and finished ninth, the best debut by a Mexican driver in a premiere open-wheel series. He was idle throughout most of 2007, but was announced as the driver of Forsythe's No. 7 car for the final two races of the season, including a return to Mexico City. Martínez started tenth and ran as high as fifth in the race, but during a routine pit stop on lap 45, his gearbox prevented him from returning to the race. The crew managed to repair it, but the job took several minutes and he finished six laps down in fourteenth. Martínez's last Champ Car race came in the series' final race, the 2008 Toyota Grand Prix of Long Beach where he finished a career-best eighth as one of three Forsythe/Petit entries.

In 2009, Martínez only professional outing was in the 24 Hours of Daytona driving Beyer Racing's Riley-Pontiac to a tenth place DP-class finish. In 2010, he re-entered American open-wheel racing by making two starts for Genoa Racing in Firestone Indy Lights with a best finish of eighth at Infineon Raceway.

== Racing record ==
Season	Series	Team	Races	wins	Poles	Fast laps	Points	Pos.	Ref
2006	Champ Car	Forsythe	1	0	0	0	13	22nd	
2007	Champ Car	Forsythe	2	0	0	0	18	20th	
2007-08	A1 Grand Prix	A1 Team Mexico	2	0	0	0	0	16th (1)	

*(1) = Team standings.

=== American open-wheel racing results ===
(key)

==== Barber Dodge Pro Series ====
Year	1	2	3	4	5	6	7	8	9	10	11	12	Rank	Points
1998	SEB	LRP	DET	WGI	CLE; 17	GRA	MOH	ROA	LS1	ATL	HMS	LS2	**40th**	-
2003	STP	MTY; 1	MIL; 9	LAG; 3	POR; 2	CLE; 4	TOR; 3	VAN; 8	MOH; 9	MTL; 17			**4th**	**103**

==== Atlantic Championship ====
Year	Team	1	2	3	4	5	6	7	8	9	10	11	12	Rank	Points
2002	Condor Motorsports-Ariba	MTY; 15	LBH	MIL	LGA	POR	CHI	TOR	CLE	TRR	ROA	MTL	DEN	31st	1
2005	US RaceTronics	LBH	MTY; 3	POR1; 6	POR2; 4	CLE1; Ret	CLE2; 8	TOR; 2	EDM; 8	SJO; 2	DEN; 5	ROA; 3	**MTL**; 3	5th	238
2006	US RaceTronics	LBH; 12	HOU; 8	MTY; 3	POR; 7	CLE1; 10	CLE2; 10	TOR; 8	EDM; 12	SJO; 6	DEN; 10	MTL; 4	ROA; 9	5th	179
2008	Forsythe Racing	LBH	LGA	MTT	EDM1	EDM2	ROA1; 7	ROA2; 7	TRR; 7	NJ; 8	UTA; 13	ATL		16th	74

==== Champ Car ====
Year	Team	No.	1	2	3	4	5	6	7	8	9	10	11	12	13	14	Rank	Points	Ref
2006	Forsythe Championship Racing	3	LBH	HOU	MTY	MIL	POR	CLE	TOR	EDM	SJO	DEN	MTL	ROA	SRF	MXC; 9	22nd	13	
2007	Forsythe Championship Racing	7	LVG	LBH	HOU	POR	CLE	MTT	TOR	EDM	SJO	ROA	ZOL	ASN	SRF; 10	MXC; 14	20th	18	

==== IndyCar Series ====
Year	Team	Chassis	No.	Engine	1	2	3	4	5	6	7	8	9	10	11	12	13	14	15	16	17	18	19	Rank	Points	Ref
2008	Forsythe/Pettit Racing	Panoz	37	Cosworth	HMS	STP	MOT^{1} DNP	LBH^{1} 8	KAN	INDY	MIL	TXS	IOW	RIR	WGL	NSH	MOH	EDM	KTY	SNM	DET	CHI	SRF	41st	0	

^{1} Run on same day.

==== Indy Lights ====
Year	Team	1	2	3	4	5	6	7	8	9	10	11	12	13	Rank	Points	Ref
2010	Genoa Racing	STP	ALA	LBH	INDY	IOW	WGL	TOR	EDM	MOH; 14	SNM; 8	CHI	KTY	HMS	25th	40	

=== Complete A1 Grand Prix results ===
(key) (Races in bold indicate pole position) (Races in italics indicate fastest lap)

Year	Entrant	1	2	3	4	5	6	7	8	9	10	11	12	13	14	15	16	17	18	19	20	21	22	DC	Points	Ref
2005–06	Mexico	GBR; SPR	GBR; FEA	GER; SPR; 8	GER; FEA; 13	POR; SPR	POR; FEA	AUS; SPR	AUS; FEA	MYS; SPR	MYS; FEA	UAE; SPR	UAE; FEA	RSA; SPR; 10	RSA; FEA; Ret	IDN; SPR	IDN; FEA	MEX; SPR	MEX; FEA	USA; SPR	USA; FEA	CHN; SPR	CHN; FEA	10th	59	
2007–08	Mexico	NED; SPR	NED; FEA	CZE; SPR	CZE; FEA	MYS; SPR	MYS; FEA	ZHU; SPR	ZHU; FEA	NZL; SPR	NZL; FEA	AUS; SPR	AUS; FEA	RSA; SPR	RSA; FEA	MEX; SPR	MEX; FEA	SHA; SPR	SHA; FEA	GBR; SPR; 20	GBR; SPR; 16			16th	22	

Sporting positions
Preceded by Jimmy Morales	Mexican Formula Two Champion; 1996	Succeeded by Ricardo Pérez de Lara
Preceded by none	Formula Renault 2.0 Mexico Champion; 2002	Succeeded by Homero Richards
