= Justin Sofio =

American racing driver (born 1979)

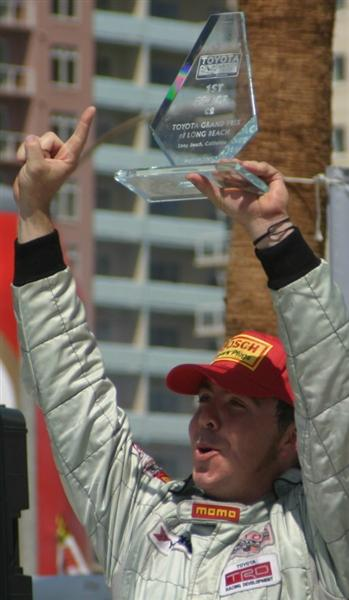
- Sofio in 2005
- Born: April 15, 1979 (age 47) Arleta, California, US

Atlantic Championship
- Years active: 2004–2008
- Teams: Binder Racing, Mathiasen Motorsports
- Starts: 34
- Wins: 0
- Poles: 0
- Best finish: 11th in 2007

Championship titles
- 2005: Atlantic C2 Cup Championship

Justin Sofio (born April 15, 1979) is an American former racing driver. Sofio won the C2 Cup in the 2005 Atlantic Championship.

== Career ==
Sofio was the chief mechanic for Jensen Motorsport's Atlantic Championship team in 2001.

Sofio made only one start in the 2004 Atlantic Championship at Long Beach, finishing 12th overall and winning the C2-class. For the remainder of the season, he worked as a mechanic for Cam Binder Racing.

In 2005, Sofio won the C2-class again at Long Beach finishing fifth overall. After Long Beach, Sofio joined Mathiasen Motorsports for the remainder of the season. Sofio won six more races in the C2-class en route to the C2 Cup championship.

Sofio returned with Mathiasen Motorsports for 2006. On top of driving, Sofio was the chief engineer, general manager, and truck driver for the team until 2007. Sofio finished a career-high 11th in the overall championship.

== Racing record ==
=== Atlantic Championship ===
Year	Team	1	2	3	4	5	6	7	8	9	10	11	12	Rank	Points	Ref
2004	Binder Racing	LBH; 13	MTY	MIL	POR1	POR2	CLE	TOR	VAN	ROA	DEN	MTL	LAG	4th^{1}	31^{1}	
2005	Binder Racing	LBH; 5	MTY											1st^{1}	273^{1}	
2005	Mathiasen Motorsports			POR1; 11	POR2; 10	CLE1; 7	CLE2; 15	TOR; 7	EDM; 9	SJO; 9	DEN; 10	ROA	MTL	1st^{1}	273^{1}	
2006	Mathiasen Motorsports	LBH; 27	HOU; 25	MTY; 19	POR; 17	CLE1; 20	CLE2; 16	TOR; 13	EDM; 19	SJO; 8	DEN; 13	MTL; 22	ROA; 14	18th	54	
2007	Mathiasen Motorsports	LVG; 9	LBH; 10	HOU; 11	POR1; 14	POR2; 18	CLE; 10	MTT; 14	TOR; 8	EDM1; 10	EDM2; 19	SJO; 8	ROA; 15	11th	112	

^{1} C2 Class
