= Al Richard Unser =

American racing driver

- Nationality: American
- Born: Alfred Richard Unser; October 23, 1982 (age 44) Phoenix, Arizona, U.S.
- Relatives: Al Unser Jr. (father); Al Unser Sr. (grandfather); Bobby Unser (great-uncle); Jerry Unser Jr. (great-uncle); Robby Unser (first cousin once removed); Louis Unser (great-grandfather)

Indy Lights career
- Debut season: 2004
- Former teams: Vision Racing; Brian Stewart Racing; Playa Del Racing; American Dream Motorsports
- Starts: 20
- Wins: 0
- Poles: 1
- Best finish: 8th in 2004

Previous series
- 2004–2006: Atlantic Championship

Alfred Richard Unser (born October 23, 1982) is an American former professional race car driver. Unser has competed in the Indy Lights series and Toyota Atlantics Championship. He is part of the fourth generation of the Unser family.

Al Richard Unser is the son of Al Unser Jr., and grandson of Al Unser Sr. Due to his family connections in auto racing, he has sometimes been known as "Al Unser III" or "Just Al." He is currently a Realtor in Albuquerque at Coldwell Banker Legacy.

== Family connections ==
Al Richard Unser is the son of two-time Indianapolis 500 winner Al Unser Jr., grandson of four-time Indy winner Al Unser Sr., and grandnephew of three-time Indy winner Bobby Unser. Another granduncle, Jerry Unser, drove in the 1958 race but died from injuries suffered in a crash in 1959.

First-cousins-once-removed (Al Unser Jr.'s cousins) Robby and Johnny also drove in the Indianapolis 500. Often considered the third generation of the famous Unser racing family, Al Richard Unser is technically the fourth generation of racers to come out of the family. His great-grandfather Jerry Sr., and Jerry's brother Louis, also were racers, but neither drove in the Indianapolis 500.

During his young childhood years, Unser was often nicknamed "Mini Al" by the media and fans, all with the expectation that he might follow in his family's footsteps to race professionally. However, as a child, Unser had reservations about becoming a race car driver. For superstitious reasons, his father (Al Unser Jr.) insisted he not be named with the suffix "III". By that time both Al Sr. and Al Jr. were stars on the Indy car circuit. Al Sr. was becoming known by the nickname "Big Al." Al Jr. for a time was known as "Little Al," thus Al Richard Unser became known for a time as "Mini Al."

As he got older and reached his teenage years, Unser decided to eschew the "Mini" nickname, and became known as "Just Al." When starting his professional career, he abandoned any sort of nickname, and has insisted on being referred to as Just Al (i.e., Al Unser), or by his full name, Al Richard Unser.

Unser's first widely noticed television appearance was at the 1992 Indianapolis 500 at age nine when his father won the race. Unser was seen greeting his father in victory circle. He also posed in official photos with his father and grandfather when Al Jr. won the Indy 500 for the second time in 1994. Unser guest-starred on an episode of Home Improvement alongside his father and grandfather in 1997.

== Career biography ==
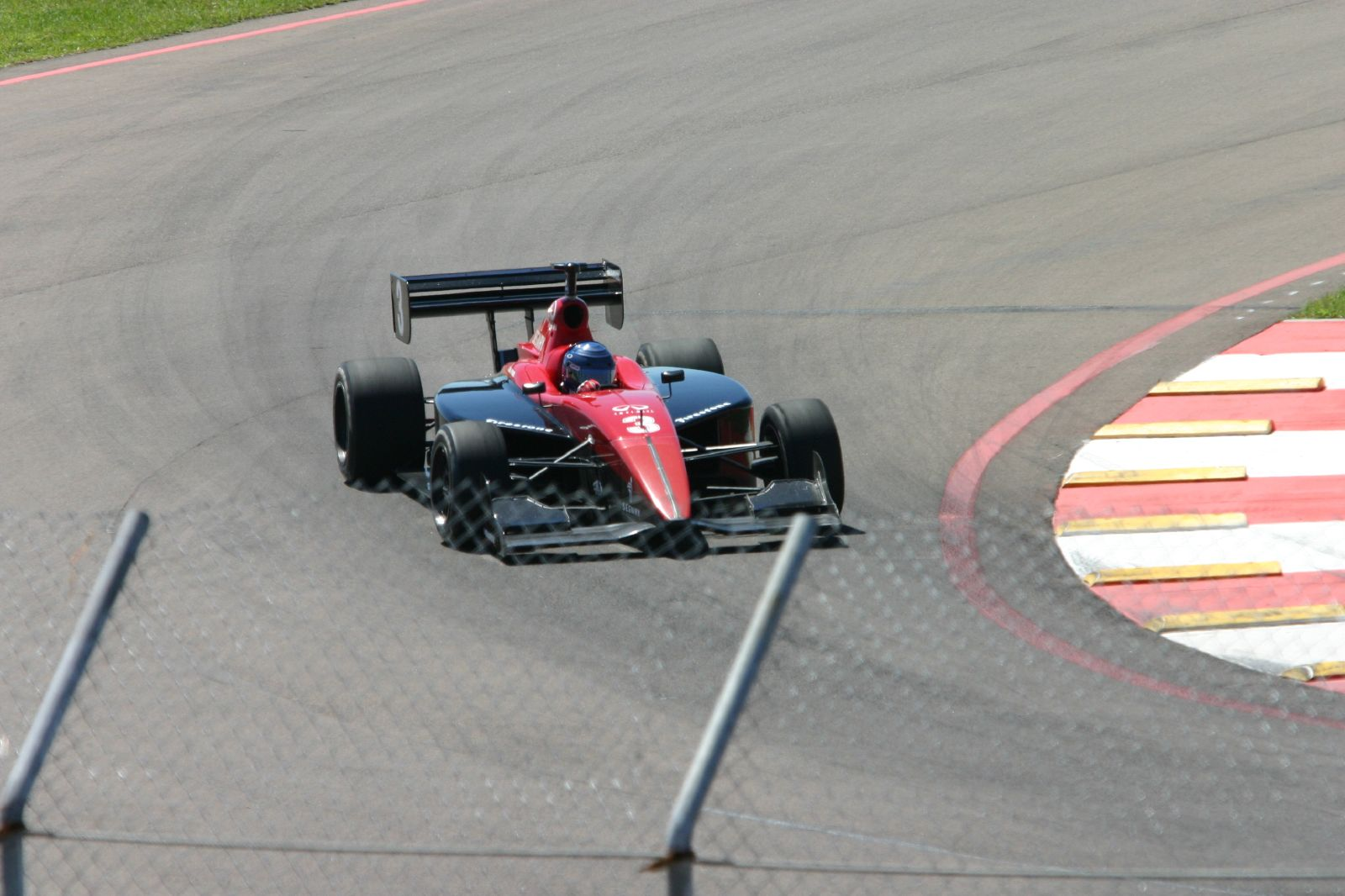
Al driving an Infiniti Pro Series car at St. Petersburg in 2005.

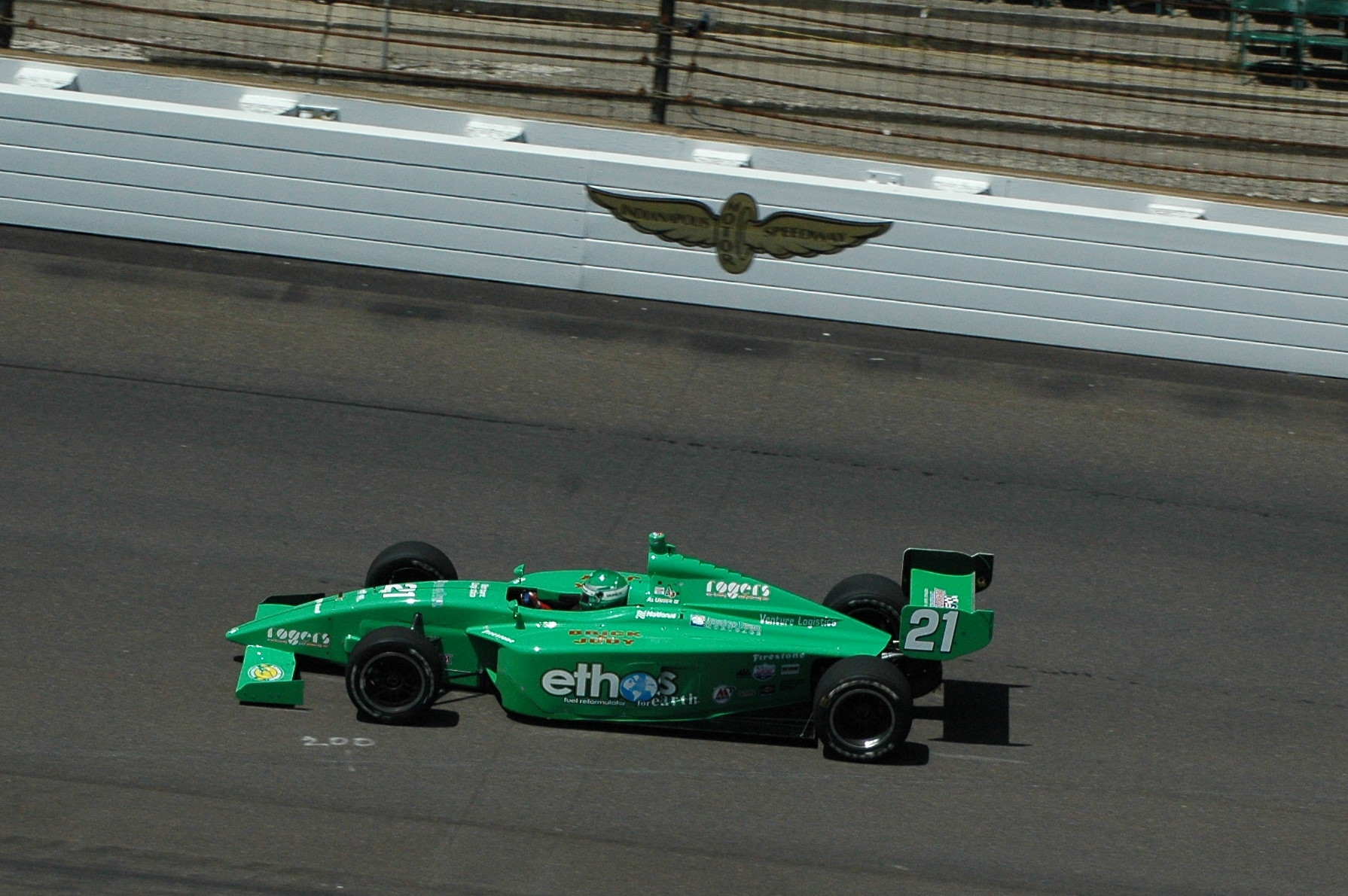
Unser racing in the 2008 Firestone Freedom 100, his last Indy Lights race to date

Unser began driving go karts at age ten, but stopped racing until after earning his driver's license at age sixteen. After attending driving schools, Unser competed in the Skip Barber Western Racing Series in 2002, winning six races and earning "Rookie of the Year" honors. A year later, he posted four top-ten finishes in the 2003 Barber Dodge Pro Series.

=== 2004 ===
In 2004, Unser made his Toyota Atlantics debut, running in four events. His best finish was an eighth place at Montreal. Unser also ran in eight races in the 2004 Infiniti Pro Series. He posted five third-place finishes, and won the pole position at Michigan.

Around that same time, Unser's father, Al Unser Jr. temporarily retired from driving to help with his career.

=== 2005 ===
Unser posted three top-ten finishes in the first four races of the Infinity Pro Series season, including a fourth place at the Freedom 100 at Indianapolis. He then returned to the Toyota Atlantics, finishing the season seventh in points. He ran ten of twelve events with a best finish of fourth.

At the Indy Lights races at St. Petersburg and Indianapolis Unser competed against fellow third-generation driver Marco Andretti of the famous rival Andretti family. It was the only two times that Al and Marco raced together.

=== 2006 ===
In 2006, Unser drove in two Atlantics series events, but lost his ride to funding issues with his team.

=== 2007 ===
Unser was signed to drive for Playa Del Racing in the Freedom 100 for 2007. He drove in three other oval races, posting three top-tens in the four events.

=== 2008 ===
For 2008, Unser was announced as the full-time driver in the No. 12 car for Playa Del Racing in Indy Lights. After five races, controlling interest in the team was sold to former Las Vegas restaurateur Eric Zimmerman, who renamed it American Dream Motorsports. After finishing 11th position at Indianapolis, Unser was reportedly released by the new owner and replaced by Tony Turco, who brought sponsorship to the program. The team posted an entry for the Milwaukee 100 on May 31, but the car never took to the track.

Unser's father (Al Jr.) drove during several seasons for Galles Racing, and Al Richard once worked for Rick Galles' Chevrolet dealership.

== Racing record ==
=== American open–wheel racing results ===
(key) (Races in bold indicate pole position)

==== Barber Dodge Pro Series ====
Year	1	2	3	4	5	6	7	8	9	10	Rank	Points
2003	STP; 11	MTY; 18	MIL; 14	LAG; 6	POR; 8	CLE; 17	TOR; 14	VAN; 10	MOH; 12	MTL; 15	**13th**	**38**

==== Indy Lights ====
Year	Team	1	2	3	4	5	6	7	8	9	10	11	12	13	14	15	16	Rank	Points
2004	Keith Duesenberg Racing	HMS	PHX	INDY	KAN; 3	NSH; 5	MIL; 3	**MIS**; 3	KTY; 11	PPIR; 6	CHI; 3	FON	TXS; 3					**8th**	**252**
2005	Brian Stewart Racing	HMS; 12	PHX; 8	STP; 4	INDY; 4	TXS	IMS	NSH	MIL	KTY	PPIR	SNM	CHI	WGL	FON			**12th**	**106**
2007	Playa Del Racing	HMS	STP1	STP2	INDY; 8	MIL; 7	IMS1	IMS2	IOW; 7	WGL1	WGL2	NSH; 13	MOH	KTY	SNM1	SNM2	CHI	**26th**	**93**
2008	Playa Del Racing	HMS; 13	STP1; 12	STP2; 6	KAN; 10	INDY; 11	MIL	IOW	WGL1	WGL2	NSH	MOH1	MOH2	KTY	SNM1	SNM2	CHI	**25th**	**102**

==== Atlantic Championship ====
Year	Team	1	2	3	4	5	6	7	8	9	10	11	12	Rank	Points
2004	P-1 Racing	LBH; Ret	MTY	MIL	POR1	POR2	CLE	TOR	VAN					**16th**	**42**
2004	Brooks Associates Racing									ROA; 9	DEN; 10	MTL; 8	LS	**16th**	**42**
2005	Brooks Associates Racing	LBH	MTY	POR1; 7	POR2; 6	CLE1; 4	CLE2; Ret	TOR; 4	EDM; 6	SJO; 6	DEN; 7	ROA; 4	MTL; 5	**7th**	**198**
2006	Mi-Jack Conquest Racing	LBH; 19	HOU; Ret	MTY; Wth	POR	CLE1	CLE2	TOR	EDM	SJO	DEN	MTL	ROA	**42nd**	**2**
