= Ryan Dalziel =

Scottish racing driver (born 1982)

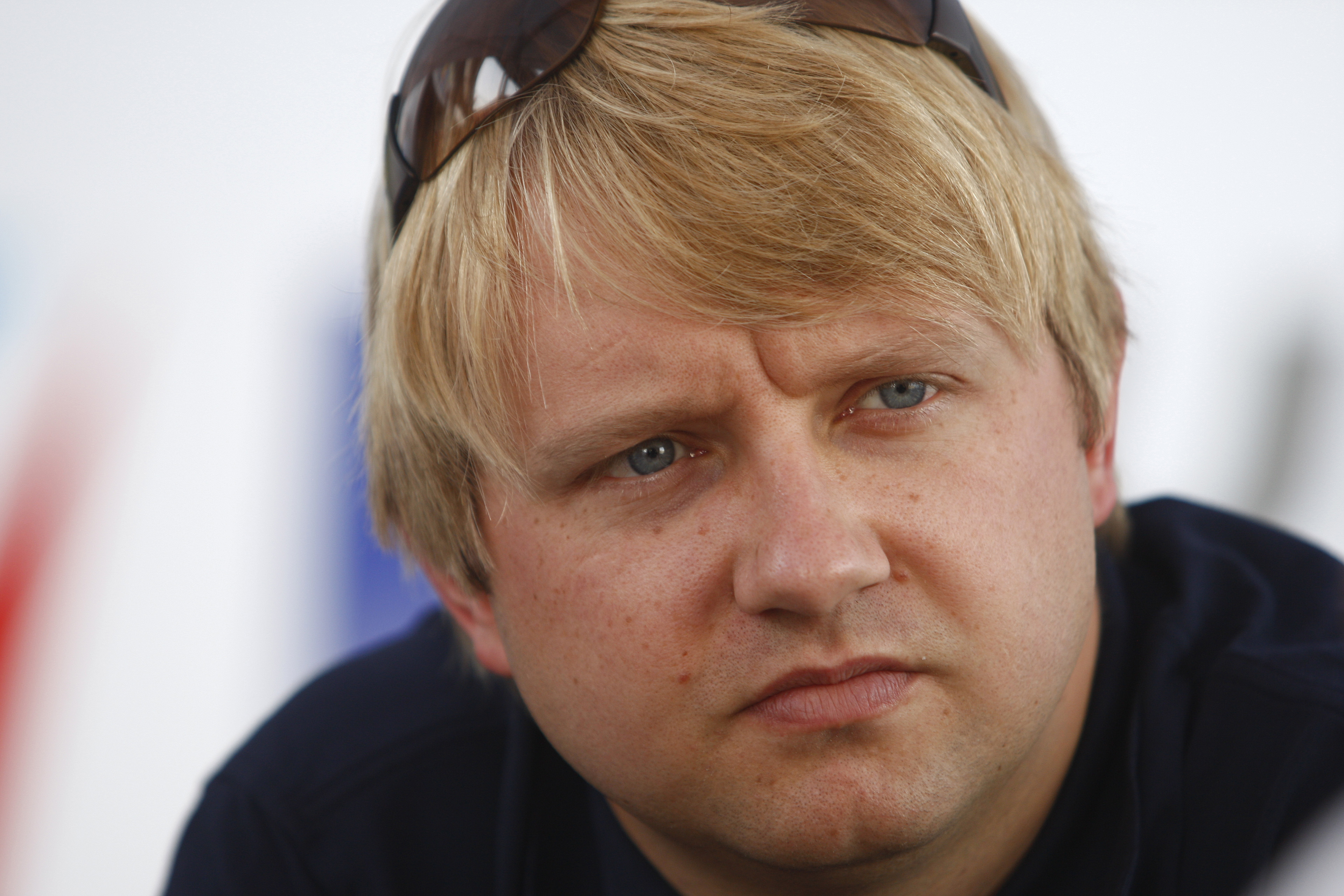
- Dalziel during the 2012 Dubai 24 Hour
- Nationality: (Scotland) Scottish
- Born: Ryan Curran Dalziel; 12 April 1982 (age 44) Glasgow, Scotland

Rolex Sports Car Series career
- Debut season: 2005
- Current team: Starworks Motorsport
- Categorisation: FIA Platinum (until 2016); FIA Gold (2017–2026); FIA Silver (2027–)
- Car number: 8
- Former teams: Action Express Racing, Orbit Racing, SAMAX Motorsport, Pacific Coast Motorsports
- Starts: 60
- Wins: 3
- Best finish: 7th in 2010

Previous series
- 1999 2000 2001 2002–2004 2005 2005, 2007: Formula Vauxhall; Formula Renault 2.0 UK; British Formula 3 Atlantic Championship; American Le Mans Series; Champ Car World Series

24 Hours of Le Mans career
- Years: 2010, 2012 – 2013, 2015 –2016, 2021
- Teams: Jaguar RSR, Starworks Motorsport
- Best finish: 7th (2012)
- Class wins: 1 (2012)

Ryan Curran Dalziel (/diˈɛl/ DEE-el; born 12 April 1982) is a Scottish professional racing driver. Dalziel has seen the most success in his career in the United States, racing in the American Le Mans Series GT1 class and the Champ Car World Series, and winning the 2010 24 Hours of Daytona.

== Career ==
Born in Glasgow, Dalziel began his car racing career in 1999 in Formula Vauxhall. He drove in British Formula Renault and British Formula 3, before moving to the United States. From 2002 until 2004, he spent three years in the Toyota Atlantic Championship, finishing runner-up twice, before moving to the American Le Mans Series in 2005. He also contested one Champ Car race for Dale Coyne Racing at Toronto, finishing ninth. In 2006, he drove a Daytona Prototype in the Rolex Sports Car Series. From 2007 to 2009, he drove part-time with various teams in the Daytona Prototype class, then returned full-time in 2010.

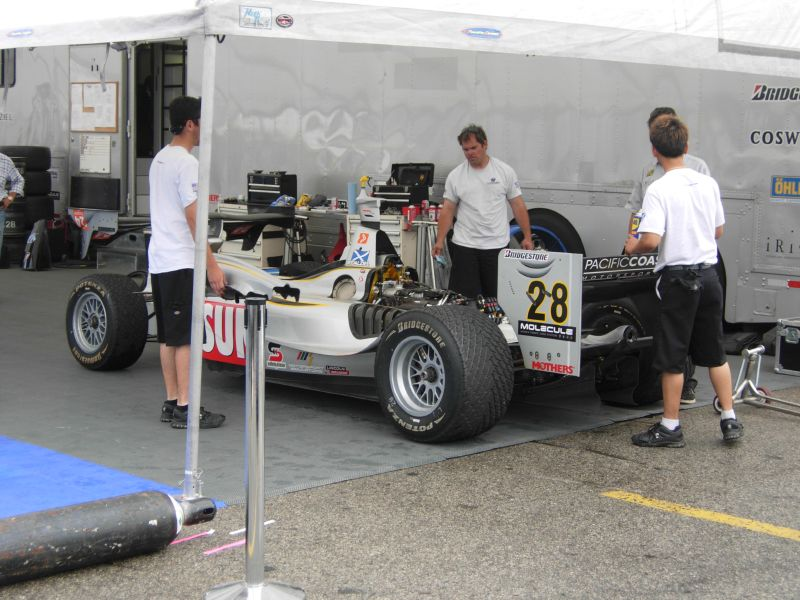
Dalziel's Champ Car at the 2007 Steelback Grand Prix of Toronto.

Dalziel returned to the Champ Car World Series in 2007 as driver of one of the two Pacific Coast Motorsports cars. He was dropped by the team and replaced by Mario Domínguez in September 2007, with two races of the season remaining. His best Champ Car finish was seventh place in the Toronto Grand Prix, at the only track he raced a Champ Car at more than once. In 2008, he piloted SAMAX Motorsport's Riley-BMW Daytona Prototype alongside teammate Henri Zogaib. He also competed in the inaugural season of Superleague Formula.

In 2009, Zogaib became under investigation for operating a Ponzi scheme in which he reportedly conned Dalziel and his father out of US$550,000. In May 2009, Dalziel won his judgement over Zogaib in the amount of US$608,000 and continues to legally battle to retrieve his money. In 2009, Dalziel competed for Orbit Racing in the Grand American Sports Car Series recording one podium finish and numerous top-tens.

Dalziel and teammates Terry Borcheller, João Barbosa, and Mike Rockenfeller won the 2010 Rolex 24 at Daytona driving a Porsche Riley for Action Express Racing. Following this, he began driving full-time for Starworks Motorsports alongside Mike Forest.

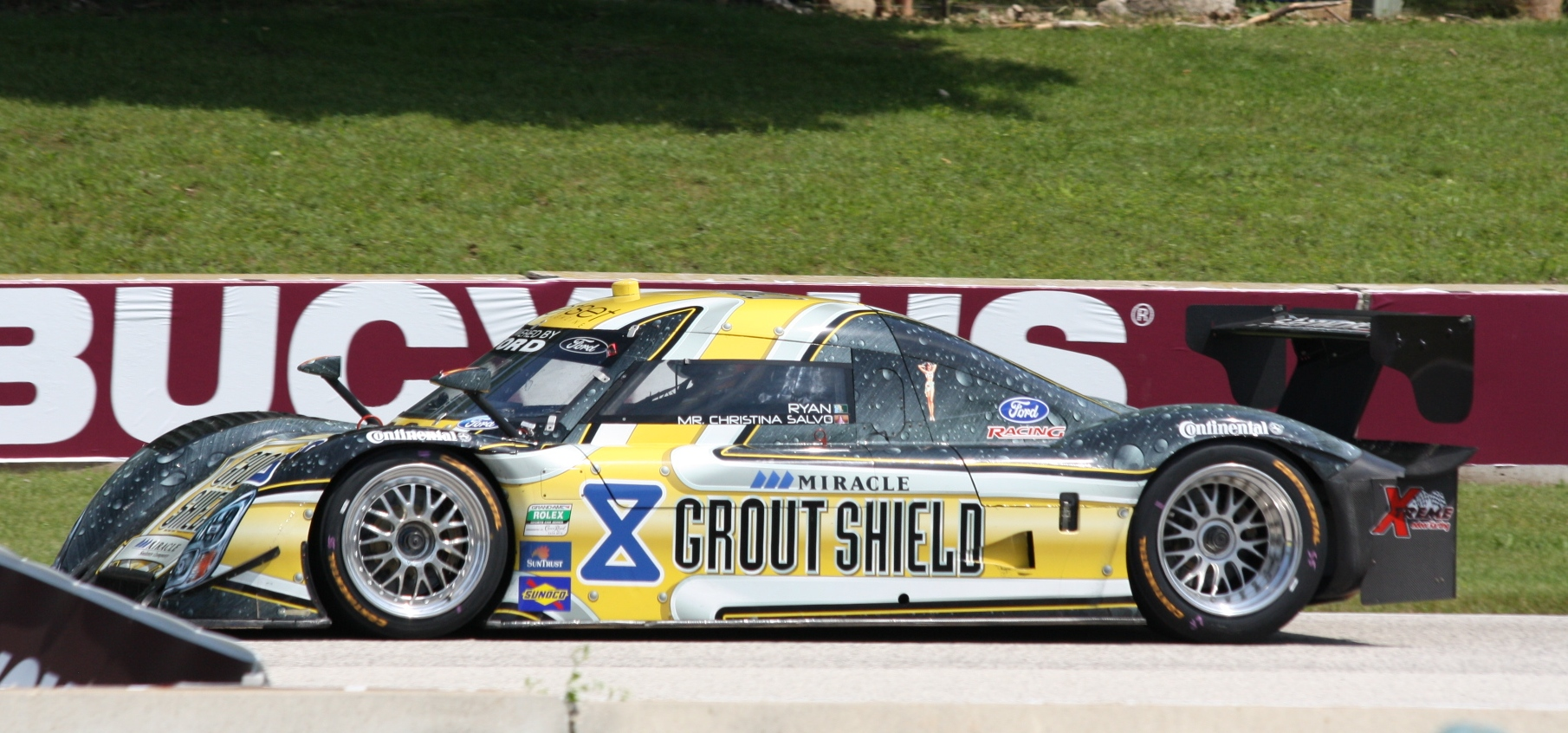
#8 2011 Daytona Prototype with Mike Forest.

On 26 January 2012, Dalziel scored his first career Rolex Sports Car Series pole position in the 2012 24 Hours of Daytona in the No. 8 Starworks Motorsport Riley-Ford Daytona Prototype. He went on to finish second in the race with teammates Allan McNish, Lucas Luhr, Enzo Potolicchio and Alex Popow. He won the Watkins Glen 200 and six podiums, finishing runner-up in the Rolex DP drivers championship. Also, Dalziel got three LMPC class wins at the American Le mans Series with Core, including Petit Le Mans.

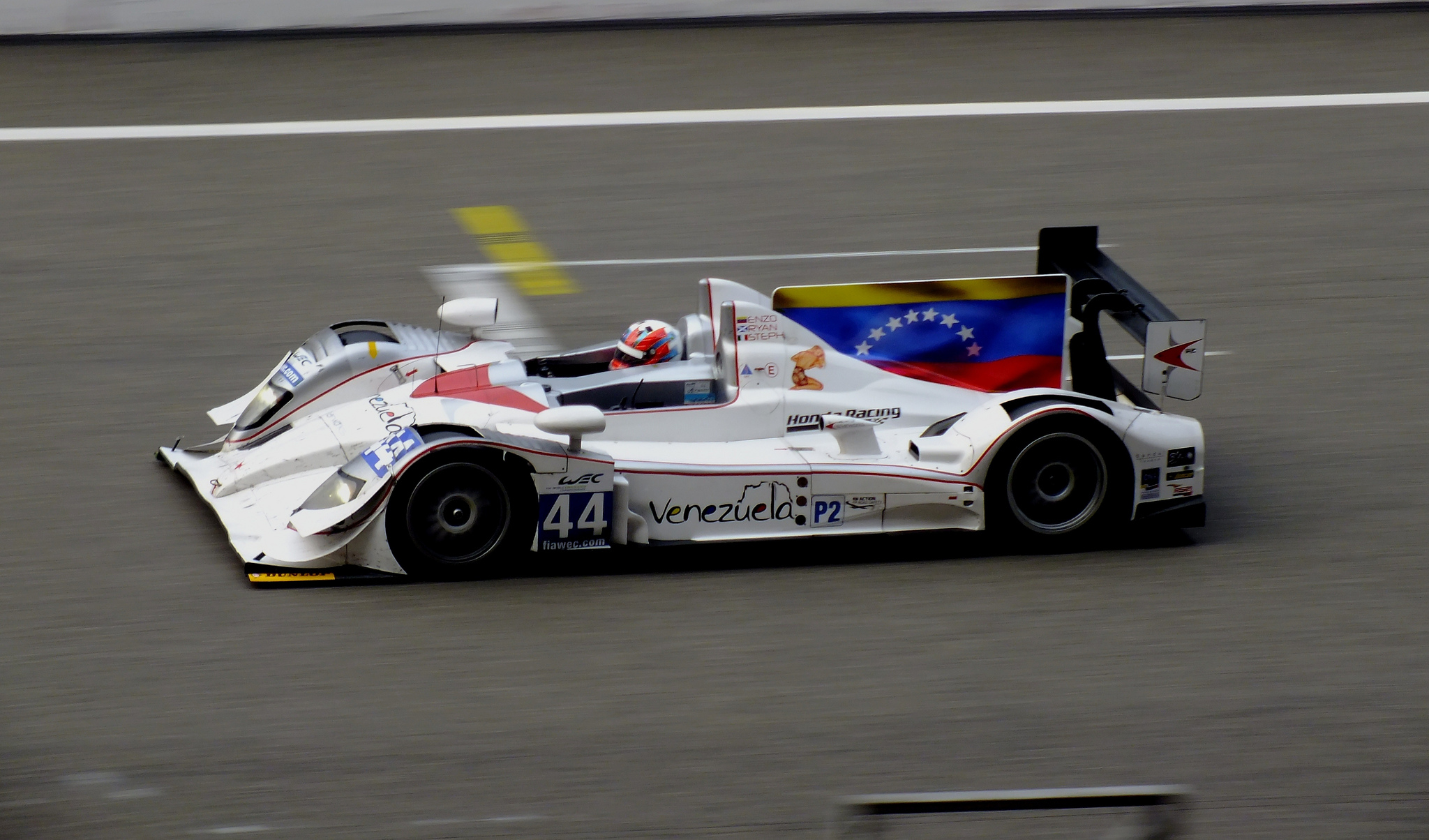
Dalziel aboard Starworks Motorsport's LMP2 at Shanghai in 2012.

At the 2012 12 Hours of Sebring, Dalziel scored a surprise third-overall finish with co-drivers Enzo Potolicchio and Stéphane Sarrazin, also taking first place in the WEC LMP2 class. He also won the 2012 24 Hours of Le Mans with Enzo Potolicchio and Tom Kimber-Smith, driving the Starworks Motorsport HPD ARX-03b in LMP2. As a result, he claimed the LMP2 teams championship.

Dalziel continued Starworks in the 2013 Rolex DP class. Partnering with Alex Popow, he got one win and five podiums. He also competed in four ALMS rounds in different classes.

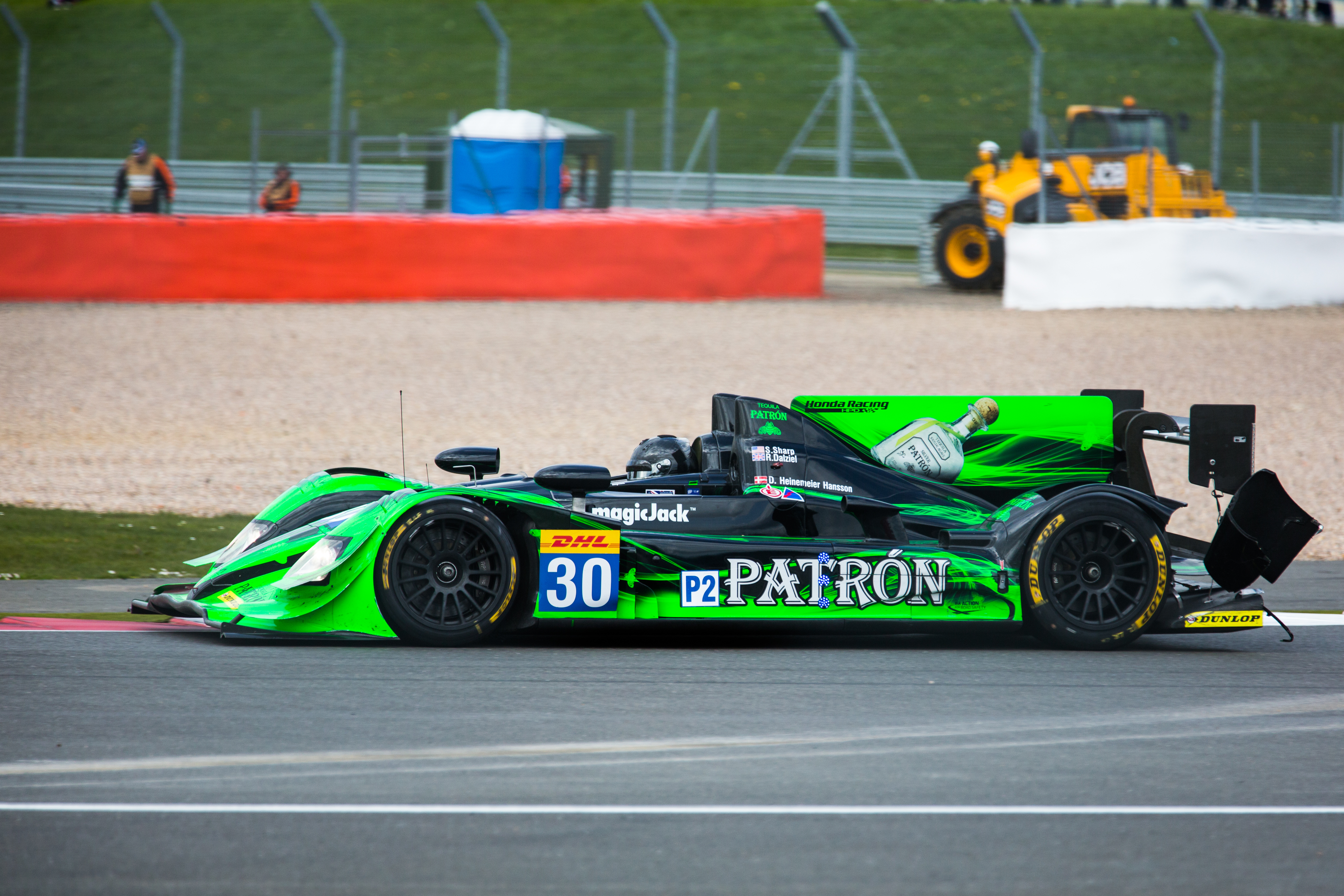
Dalziel racing for the Patrón-branded Extreme Speed Motorsports team in 2015.

In 2014, Dalziel was signed by Extreme Speed Motorsports to drive an HPD LMP2 at the new IMSA United SportsCar Championship, with Scott Sharp as co-driver. He got two overall podiums, but missed two rounds and collected four DNFs, ending tenth in the Prototype teams championship. Later he drove in the final three rounds of the Pirelli World Challenge with an Effort Porsche 911 GT3, collecting two wins and three second-place finishes in six races.

Dalziel continued with Extreme Speed Motorsports in 2015 but at the FIA World Endurance Championship. With David Heinemeier Hansson as third driver, he finished seventh in the standings. Also, he remained driving an Effort Porsche 911 GT3 in the Pirelli World Challenge. He claimed two wins and ten podiums in 17 races, finishing third in the standings despite missing two rounds. Dalziel won the Porsche Cup, an annual award presented by Porsche AG to recognize the world's most successful privateer racing driver competing with Porsche machinery in a customer racing team, in 2015.

In 2016, Dalziel would continue with ESM in the WEC, and will enter the IMSA SportsCar Championship with a VisitFlorida Racing Corvette DP at all rounds except Long Beach, due to a conflict with the WEC.

== Motorsports Career results ==
=== American open–wheel racing results ===
(key)

==== Atlantic Championship ====
Year	Team	1	2	3	4	5	6	7	8	9	10	11	12	Rank	Points	Ref
2002	Shank Racing	MTY; 2	LBH; Ret	MIL; 10	LS; 4	POR; 7	CHI; 15	TOR; 18	CLE; 9	TRR; Ret	ROA; 9	MTL; 3		8th	89	
2002	Hylton Motorsports												**DEN**; 2	8th	89	
2003	Sierra Sierra Racing	MTY; 4	LBH; Ret	**MIL**; 1	LS; 2	**POR**; 1	CLE; 3	TOR; 5	TRR; 2	MOH; 2	MTL; 2	DEN; 3	MIA; 3	**2nd**	**175**	
2004	Sierra Sierra Racing	**LBH**; 1	**MTY**; 8	MIL; Ret	POR1; 5	POR2; 2	**CLE**; 1	TOR; 6	**VAN**; 1	**ROA**; 1	DEN; 2	MTL; 2	LS; 6	**2nd**	**309**	

==== Champ Car ====
Year	Team	No.	1	2	3	4	5	6	7	8	9	10	11	12	13	14	Rank	Points	Ref
2005	Dale Coyne Racing	19	LBH	MTY	MIL	POR	CLE	TOR; 9	EDM	SJO	DEN	MTL	LVS	SRF	MXC		23rd	13	
2007	Pacific Coast Motorsports	28	LVS; 11	LBH; 9	HOU; 8	POR; 14	CLE; 9	MTT; 10	TOR; 7	EDM; 12	SJO; Inj	ROA; 17	ZOL; 15	ASN; 10	SRF	MXC	14th	116	

=== Superleague Formula ===
(Races in bold indicate pole position) (Races in italics indicate fastest lap)

Year	Team	Operator	1		2	3		4		5		6		Position	Points
2008	Rangers F.C.	Alan Docking Racing	DON		NÜR	ZOL		EST		VAL		JER		13th	227
2008	Rangers F.C.	Alan Docking Racing	8	14		8	17	13	15	5	7	15	6	13th	227

=== Sports car racing results ===
(key)

==== Complete FIA World Endurance Championship results ====
Year	Entrant	Class	Car	Engine	1	2	3	4	5	6	7	8	9	Rank	Points
2012	Starworks Motorsport	LMP2	HPD ARX-03b	Honda HR28TT 2.8 L Turbo V6	SEB; 3	SPA; 29	LMS; 7	SIL; 9	SÃO; 7	BHR	FUJ; 9	SHA; 8		12th	48.5
2015	Extreme Speed Motorsports	LMP2	HPD ARX-03b Ligier JS P2	Honda HR28TT 2.8 L Turbo V6	SIL; DSQ	SPA; 8	**LMS**; 5	NÜR; 6	COA; 4	FUJ; 4	SHA; Ret	BHR; 7		9th	62
2016	Extreme Speed Motorsports	LMP2	Ligier JS P2	Nissan VK45DE 4.5 L V8	SIL; 2	SPA; 2	LMS; 8	NÜR; 3	MEX; 3	COA; 5	FUJ; 5	SHA; 5	BHR; 4	4th	116

==== IMSA WeatherTech SportsCar Championship results ====
(key)(Races in bold indicate pole position, Results are overall/class)

Year	Team	Class	Make	Engine	1	2	3	4	5	6	7	8	9	10	11	Rank	Points	Ref
2014	Extreme Speed Motorsports	P	HPD ARX-03b	Honda HR28TT 2.8 L V6 Turbo	DAY; 15	SIR; 2	LBH; 6	LAG; 11	DET; 5	WAT; 10	MSP; 8	IMS; 5	ELK; 3	COA	PET	9th	228	
2014	Starworks Motorsport	PC	Oreca FLM09	Chevrolet LS3 6.2 L V8	DAY	SIR	LGA	KAN; 7	WGI	IMS	ELK	VIR	AUS	ATL		41st	25	
2015	Tequila Patrón ESM	P	HPD ARX-04b 1 HPD ARX-03b 2	Honda HR28TT 2.8 L V6 Turbo	DAY; 10	SIR; 9	LBH	LAG	DET	WAT	MSP	ELK	COA	PET		21st	45	
2016	VisitFlorida Racing	P	Coyote Corvette DP	Chevrolet 5.5L V8	DAY; 3	SIR; 5	LBH	LAG; 2	DET; 7	WAT; 6	MSP; 4	ELK; 6	COA; 7	PET; 7		9th	247	
2017	Tequila Patrón ESM	P	Nissan Onroak DPi	Nissan VR38DETT 3.8 L Turbo V6	DAY; 4	SIR; 11	LBH; 2	COA; 6	DET; 8	WAT; 7	MSP; 3	ELK; 3	LAG; 6	PET; 1		5th	273	
2018	Tequila Patrón ESM	P	Nissan Onroak DPi	Nissan VR38DETT 3.8 L Turbo V6	DAY; 19	SEB; 16	LBH; 2	MOH; 10	DET; 4	WGL; 15	MOS; 12	ELK; 9	LGA; 11	PET; 11		14th	205	
2019	Starworks Motorsport	GTD	Audi R8 LMS Evo	Audi 5.2 L V10	DAY; 13	SEB; 14	MOH; 9	DET; 6†	WGL; 12	MOS	LIM	ELK; 10	VIR	LGA	PET	24th	97	
2020	Tower Motorsport by Starworks	LMP2	Oreca 07	Gibson GK428 4.2 L V8	DAY; 4†	SEB; 4	ELK	ATL	PET	LGA	SEB					21st	28	
2021	Era Motorsport with IDEC Sport	LMP2	Oreca 07	Gibson GK428 4.2 L V8	DAY; 1†	SEB; 2	WGI; 5	WGI	ELK; 1	LGA; 4	ATL; 5					4th	1620	
2022	Era Motorsport	LMP2	Oreca 07	Gibson GK428 4.2 L V8	DAY; 10†	SEB; 3	LGA; 2	MOH; 5	WGL; 7	ELK; 1	PET; 5					2nd	1892	
2023	Era Motorsport	LMP2	Oreca 07	Gibson GK428 4.2 L V8	DAY; 9†	SEB; 3	LGA; 7	WGL; 2	ELK; 6	IMS; 6	PET; 5					5th	1740	
2024	Era Motorsport	LMP2	Oreca 07	Gibson GK428 4.2 L V8	DAY; 1	SEB; 1	WGL; 12	MOS; 11	ELK; 4	IMS; 3	PET; 3					3rd	2118	
2025	Era Motorsport	LMP2	Oreca 07	Gibson GK428 4.2L V8	DAY; 4	SEB	WGL	MOS; 7	ELK	IMS	PET					36th	561	

^{†} Points only counted towards the WeatherTech Sprint Cup, and not the overall GTD Championship. ^{†} Points only counted towards the Michelin Endurance Cup, and not the overall LMP2 Championship.

* Season still in progress

==== Pirelli World Challenge results ====
Year	Team	Make	Engine	Class	1	2	3	4	5	6	7	8	9	10	11	12	13	14	15	16	17	18	19	Rank	Points
2017	CRP Racing	Mercedes	AMG GT3	GT	STP1; 16	STP2; 7	LBH; 6	VIR1; 5	VIR2; 1	MOS1; 6	LRP1; 6	LRP2; 9	ELK1; Ret	ELK2; 9	MOH1; 7	MOH2; 9	UTA1; 9	UTA2; 8	COA1; 3	COA2; 5	COA3; 1	SON1; 6	SON2; 5	5th	276

==== 24 Hours of Le Mans results ====
Year	Team	Co-Drivers	Car	Class	Laps	Pos.	Class Pos.
2010	(United States) Jaguar RSR	(United States) Paul Gentilozzi (Belgium) Marc Goossens	Jaguar XKR GT2	GT2	4	DNF	DNF
2012	(United States) Starworks Motorsport	(Venezuela) Enzo Potolicchio (United Kingdom) Tom Kimber-Smith	HPD ARX-03b	LMP2	354	7th	**1st**
2013	(United States) SRT Motorsports	(Belgium) Marc Goossens (Germany) Dominik Farnbacher	SRT Viper GTS-R	GTE; Pro	306	24th	8th
2015	(United States) Extreme Speed Motorsports	(United States) Scott Sharp (Denmark) David Heinemeier Hansson	Ligier JS P2-Honda	LMP2	329	28th	10th
2016	(United States) Extreme Speed Motorsports	(Canada) Chris Cumming (Brazil) Pipo Derani	Ligier JS P2-Nissan	LMP2	291	42nd	16th
2021	(France) IDEC Sport	(France) Thomas Laurent (United States) Dwight Merriman	Oreca 07-Gibson	LMP2; Pro-Am	0	WD	WD
