= Aaron Justus =

American racing driver (born 1973)

- Nationality: (United States) American
- Born: October 23, 1973 (age 53) Pittsfield, Illinois
- Retired: 2003

Atlantic Championship
- Years active: 2002-2003
- Teams: Performance Development & Racing; RuSPORT
- Starts: 15
- Wins: 0
- Poles: 0
- Best finish: 5th in 2003

Previous series
- 1996-2000 1995: USF2000; USAC Formula Russell

Championship titles
- 2000: USF2000

Aaron Justus (born October 23, 1973, in Pittsfield, Illinois) is a former American racing driver. Justus won the USF2000 championship in the year 2000 and continued into the Atlantic Championship. Currently Justus is an entrepreneur with his own graphics design company.

== Career ==
Justus started his karting career in 1981 at the age of eight. In 1985, the young driver won the IKF Grand National Championship in the Junior I class. He won another Grand National Championship in 1988 in the Junior III class.

In 1995, Justus started his formula racing career in the United States Auto Club sanctioned Formula Russell Championship winning the series. For 1996, Justus was one of 25 drivers selected for the Team Green Academy. After catching the eye of Atlantic Championship and CART team owner John Della Penna the plan was to replace Richie Hearn in the Atlantics race seat. However money was a factor and the budget did not come together. In 1996, Justus started four USF2000 races. His best result was in the streets of St. Petersburg where he finished fifth. Funding his racing efforts with graphics design work Justus did not race in 1997. In 1998, Justus had one single USF2000 outing, at the 1998 Colorado Grand Prix. Justus finished his Van Diemen chassis in third place for the first race, behind David Besnard and Sam Hornish Jr.

The sole 1998 outing impressed Gerald Forsythe who brought Justus in at Cape Motorsports for the 1999 season. Justus won the third round of the season at Lowe's Motor Speedway. Later in the season, Justus also won the second race at Road Atlanta. Despite missing the last four races of the season, Justus finished tenth in the season standings. He returned with the team for 2000 for a full-time outing. In 2000, Justus dominated the series. Justus claimed eight pole positions in thirteen races. The young driver won five of the races and claimed the championship.

After a sabbatical Justus returned for 2002 for three races in the Atlantic Championship with Performance Development & Racing. His best finish was a seventh place at the Denver street circuit. For 2003, Justus joined RuSPORT for a full-time effort alongside A. J. Allmendinger. Despite failing to win a race, Justus scored four podium finishes. Justus finished fifth in the series standings. At the end of the season Justus retired from competitive autosport to run his graphics design company Manifest Group.

== Racing record ==
=== American Open-Wheel racing results ===
(key) (Races in bold indicate pole position, races in italics indicate fastest race lap)

==== USF2000 National Championship ====
Year	Entrant	1	2	3	4	5	6	7	8	9	10	11	12	13	14	Pos	Points
1996		WDW; 27	STP; 5	PIR; 25	DSC1; 11	MOS	IRP	RIR	WGI1	WGI2	MOH	NHS	LVS			**N.C.**	**N.C.**
1998		WDW	PIR	HMS1	HMS2	WGI	WGI	MOH1	MIN	CHA1	CHA2	MOH2	ATL	PPI; 3	PPI; 6	**N.C.**	**N.C.**
1999	Cape Motorsports	PIR; 7	CHA1; 28	CHA2; 1	**MOS**; 2	**MOS**; 14	MOH; 26	ATL	**ROA1**; 22	**ROA2**; 1	CTR; 5	MOH	PPI	SEB1	SEB2	**10th**	**132**
2000	Cape Motorsports	**PIR**; 1	MOS1; 5	**MOS2**; 2	**IRP1**; 1	ROA1; 1	ROA1; 6	TRR; 2	MOS3; 3	**WGI1**; 22	**WGI2**; 1	**IRP2**; 1	**ATL1**; 4	**ATL2**; 3		**1st**	**293**

==== Atlantic Championship ====
Year	Team	1	2	3	4	5	6	7	8	9	10	11	12	Rank	Points
2002	Performance Development & Racing	MTY	LBH	MIL	LS	POR	CHI	TOR	CLE	TRR	ROA; 8	MTL; 23	DEN; 7	**21st**	**17**
2003	RuSPORT	MTY; 5	LBH; 2	MIL; 5	LS; 4	POR; 5	CLE; 13	TOR; 2	TRR; 14	MOH; 3	MTL; 3	DEN; 13	MIA; 7	**5th**	**123**
