= Kyle Kelley =

American racing driver (born 1985)

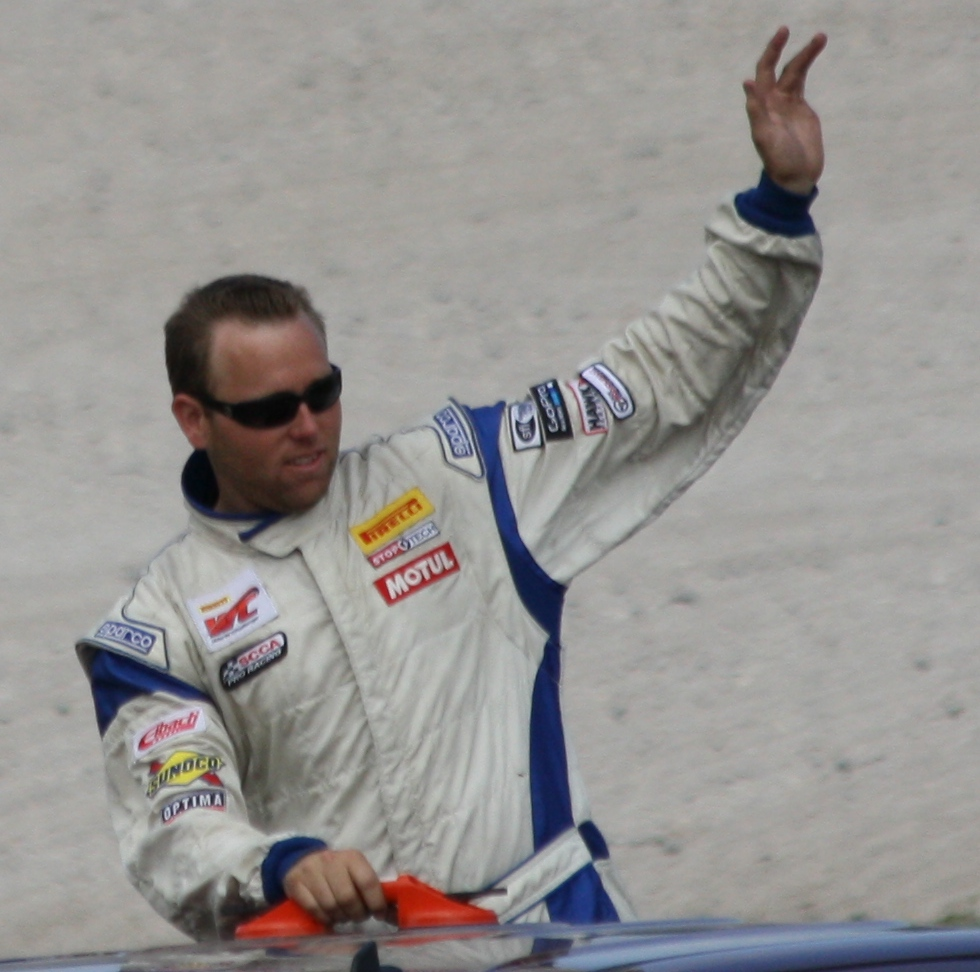
- Kelley at Road America in 2013
- Born: Kyle Robert Kelley; June 28, 1985 (age 41); Huntington Beach, California, U.S.
- Achievements: 2014 SCCA National Championship Runoffs GT1 champion

NASCAR O'Reilly Auto Parts Series career
- 12 races run over 5 years
- 2026 position: 65th
- Best finish: 60th (2013)
- First race: 2010 Bucyrus 200 (Road America)
- Last race: 2026 Pit Boss/FoodMaxx 250 (Sonoma)
Wins	Top tens	Poles
0	0	0
- Statistics up to date as of November 7, 2026.

Kyle Robert Kelley (born June 28, 1985) is an American professional sports car racing driver in the Trans-Am Series' TA2 class. He has also competed in the NASCAR O'Reilly Auto Parts Series, having previously competed in the series from 2010 to 2026 as a road course ringer.

== Racing career ==
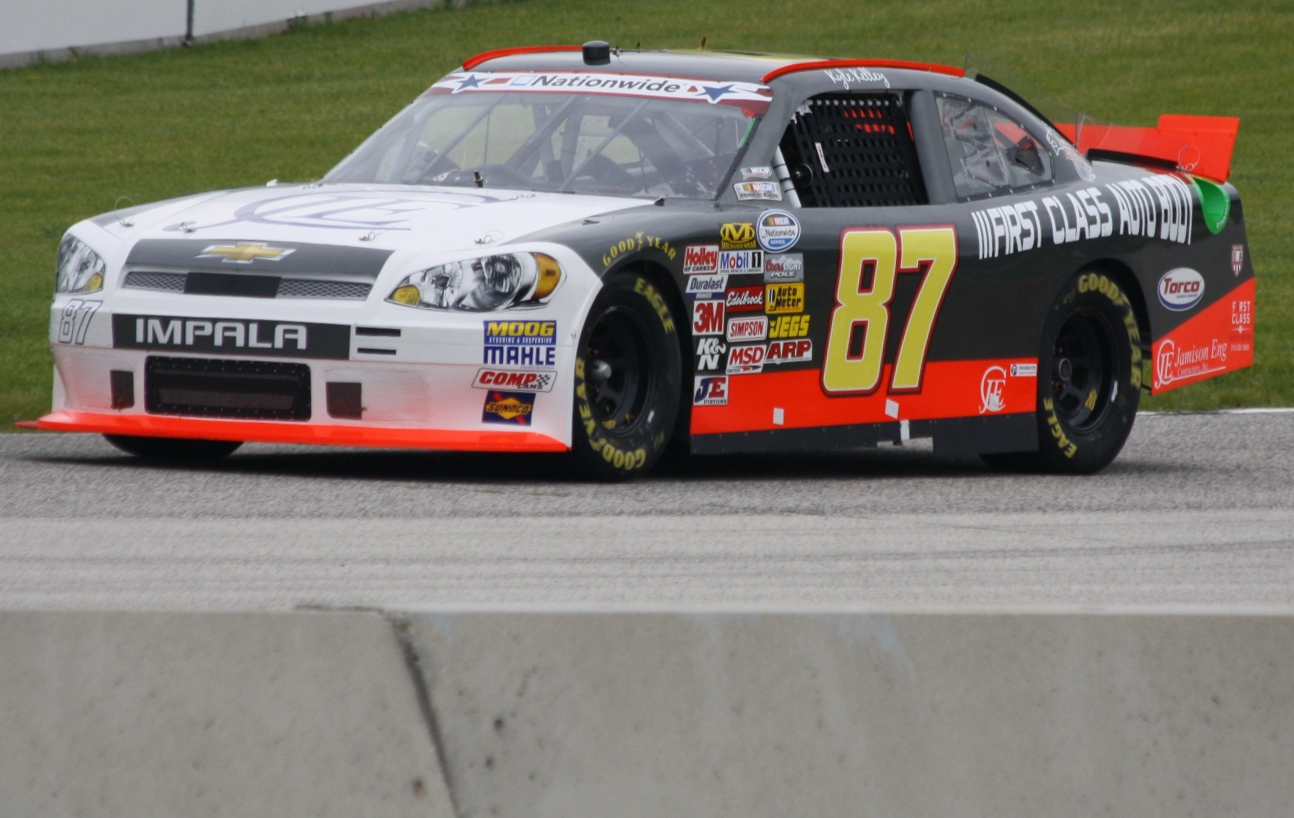
Kelley's Nationwide car at Road America in 2013

Kelley began racing in the Trans-Am Series' TA2 class in 2009, eventually competing full-time the following year. In June 2010, in addition to the Trans-Am race at the track, he ran the inaugural NASCAR Nationwide Series race at Road America. Kelley continued making starts in NASCAR as a road course ringer through 2013, racing at Watkins Glen International, Circuit Gilles Villeneuve, and the series' first event at Mid-Ohio Sports Car Course in 2013.

In 2014, Kelley won the SCCA National Championship Runoffs' GT1 class at Mazda Raceway Laguna Seca.

== Motorsports career results ==
=== NASCAR ===
(key) (Bold – Pole position awarded by qualifying time. Italics – Pole position earned by points standings or practice time. * – Most laps led.)

==== O'Reilly Auto Parts Series ====
NASCAR O'Reilly Auto Parts Series results
Year	Team	No.	Make	1	2	3	4	5	6	7	8	9	10	11	12	13	14	15	16	17	18	19	20	21	22	23	24	25	26	27	28	29	30	31	32	33	34	35	NOAPSC	Pts	Ref
2010	UP Racing	59	Chevy	DAY	CAL	LVS	BRI	NSH	PHO	TEX	TAL	RCH	DAR	DOV	CLT	NSH	KEN	ROA; 37	NHA	DAY	CHI	GTY	IRP	IOW	GLN; 20	MCH	BRI	CGV; 31	ATL	RCH	DOV	KAN	CAL	CLT	GTY	TEX	PHO	HOM	91st	225	
2011	NEMCO Motorsports	97	Chevy	DAY	PHO	LVS	BRI	CAL	TEX	TAL	NSH	RCH	DAR	DOV	IOW	CLT	CHI	MCH	ROA	DAY	KEN	NHA	NSH	IRP	IOW	GLN; 26	CGV; 14	BRI	ATL	RCH	CHI	DOV	KAN	CLT	TEX	PHO	HOM		62nd	48	
2012	UP Racing	59	Chevy	DAY	PHO	LVS	BRI	CAL	TEX	RCH	TAL	DAR	IOW	CLT	DOV	MCH	ROA; 35	KEN	DAY	NHA	CHI	IND	IOW	GLN; 21	CGV; 21	BRI	ATL	RCH	CHI	KEN	DOV	CLT	KAN	TEX	PHO	HOM			61st	55	
2013	Team Kelley Racing	87	Chevy	DAY	PHO	LVS	BRI	CAL	TEX	RCH	TAL	DAR	CLT	DOV	IOW	MCH	ROA; 31	KEN	DAY	NHA	CHI	IND	IOW	GLN; 19	MOH; 32	BRI	ATL	RCH	CHI	KEN	DOV	KAN	CLT	TEX	PHO	HOM			60th	50	
2026	Joey Gase Motorsports with Scott Osteen	53	Chevy	DAY	ATL	COA	PHO	LVS	DAR	MAR	CAR	BRI	KAN	TAL	TEX	GLN	DOV	CLT	NSH	POC	COR	SON; 34	CHI	ATL	IND	IOW	DAY	DAR	GTW	BRI	LVS	CLT	PHO	TAL	MAR	HOM			65th	3	

==== K&N Pro Series West ====
NASCAR K&N Pro Series West results
Year	Team	No.	Make	1	2	3	4	5	6	7	8	9	10	11	12	13	14	15	NKNPSWC	Pts	Ref
2008	UP Racing	7	Dodge	AAS	PHO	CTS	IOW	CNS	SON; 8	IRW	DCS	EVG	MMP; 24	IRW	AMP	AAS			38th	238	
2009	UP Racing	7	Chevy	CTS	AAS	PHO; 21	MAD	IOW	DCS	SON; 10	IRW	PIR; 11	MMP; 10	CNS	IOW	AAS			25th	498	
2010	UP Racing	7	Dodge	AAS; 12															24th	464	
2010	UP Racing	7	Chevy		PHO; 22	IOW	DCS	SON	IRW	PIR; 26	MRP	CNS	MMP; 5	AAS	PHO				24th	464	
2011	UP Racing	7	Chevy	PHO	AAS	MMP; 23	IOW	LVS	SON; 11	IRW	EVG	PIR; 13	CNS	MRP	SPO	AAS	PHO		40th	348	
2012	UP Racing	7	Chevy	PHO	LHC	MMP; 19	S99	IOW	BIR	LVS	SON	EVG	CNS	IOW	PIR; 15	SMP	AAS	PHO	42nd	54	
2015	Cooley Racing	2	Chevy	KCR	IRW	TUS	IOW	SHA	SON; 38	SLS	IOW	EVG	CNS	MER	AAS	PHO			75th	6	
