= The Room Store =

American furniture store chain

The Room Store Inc.
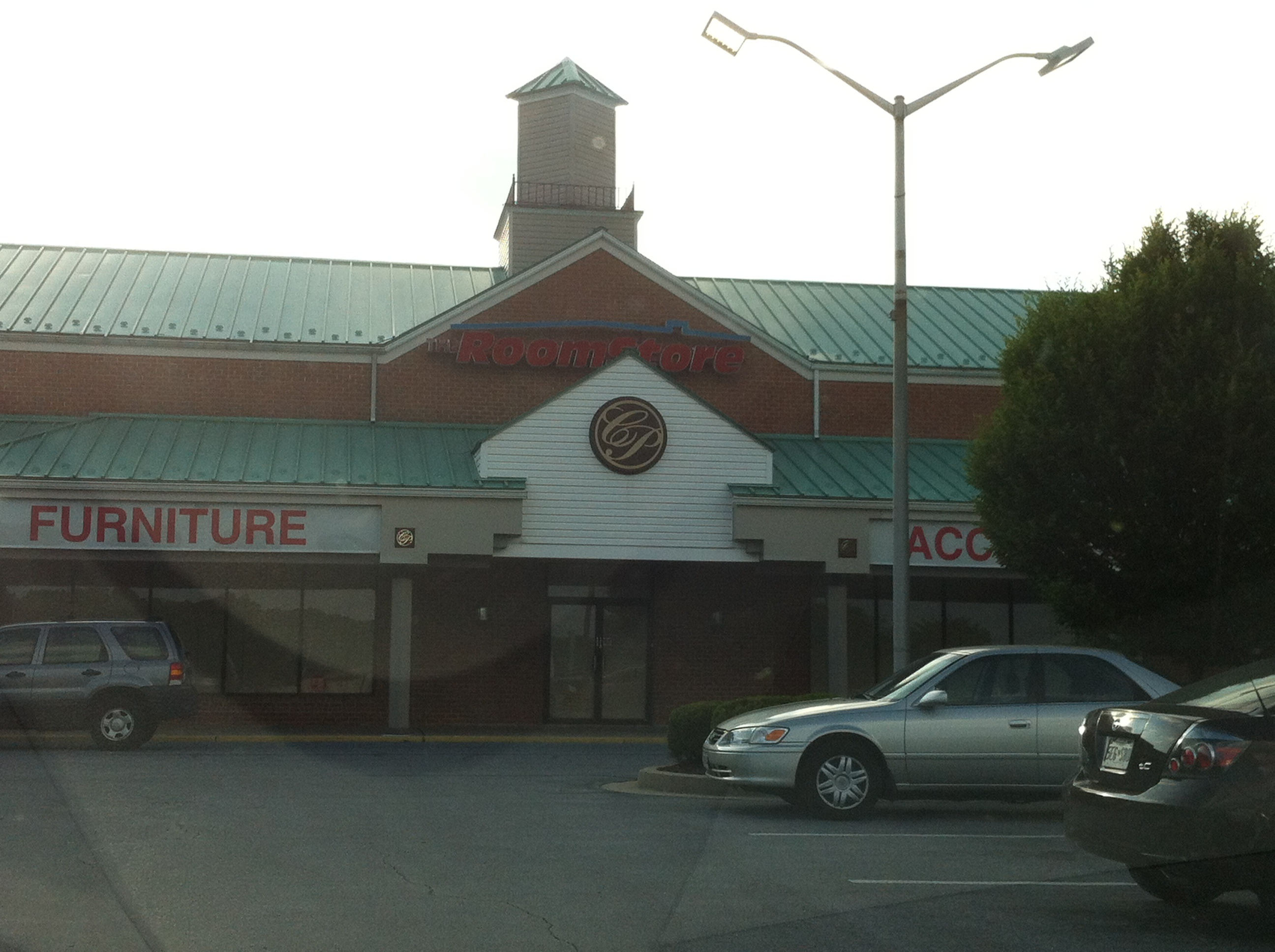
- A (Now Closed) location of the Room Store.
- Type: Private
- Founded: 1992
- Founder: Gary Levitz (1938–1999)
- Defunct: November 26, 2012 (RoomStore, Inc.); July 11, 2016 (The RoomStores of Phoenix, LLC)
- Fate: Liquidation of assets
- Headquarters: RoomStore, Inc.: Austin, Texas, U.S.; The RoomStores of Phoenix, LLC: Phoenix, Arizona, U.S.
- Products: Furniture
- Website: roomstore.com arizonaroomstore.com

The Room Store (commonly stylized as RoomStore) was a chain of furniture retail stores in the eastern and southern United States, which operated from 1992 to 2012. The company, which was owned by RoomStore, Inc., specialized in retailing all the pieces of furniture for an entire room rather than individual pieces of furniture. For example, a table may have been sold with chairs and other dining room accessories in a package rather than a table alone. The Room Store was ranked as one of the top 25 furniture retailers in the United States. A similar chain with the same name (known as The RoomStores of Phoenix, LLC) operated stores in Arizona from 1993 to 2016.

== History ==
The Room Store was founded in 1992 in Texas by Gary Levitz, grandson of the founder of Levitz Furniture. The chain started with 4 stores in the Dallas-Ft. Worth area. In 1999, Levitz was killed in a plane crash.

The Room Store's then-parent company, Heilig-Meyers, filed for bankruptcy protection in 2000; at the time, there were over 50 locations around the United States. in 2005, The Room Store, the only part of Heilig-Meyers remaining, received $35 million to emerge from bankruptcy.

RoomStore, Inc. filed for Chapter 11 bankruptcy on December 12, 2011; in April 2012, it announced it would close all of the RoomStore stores in Texas.

On June 29, 2012, RoomStore, Inc. announced that it would close all of its RoomStore stores in the eastern and southern United States beginning on August 2, 2012. All of those locations were closed on or before November 26, 2012.

The twelve RoomStore-branded stores in Arizona (which were owned by The RoomStores of Phoenix, LLC) were not initially affected by the bankruptcy. However, on December 18, 2015, that company filed for Chapter 11 bankruptcy. Liquidation sales at all twelve stores began in January 2016, and those locations were permanently closed once the sales concluded on July 11, 2016. Continued effects of the 2008 real estate bubble and increased competition among furniture retailers in the Phoenix area were cited as reasons for the bankruptcy.

Private investment company Oak Point Partners acquired the remnant assets, consisting of any known and unknown assets that weren't previously administered, from the RoomStore, Inc. Bankruptcy Estate on August 28, 2017.
