= Grand Prix of Denver =

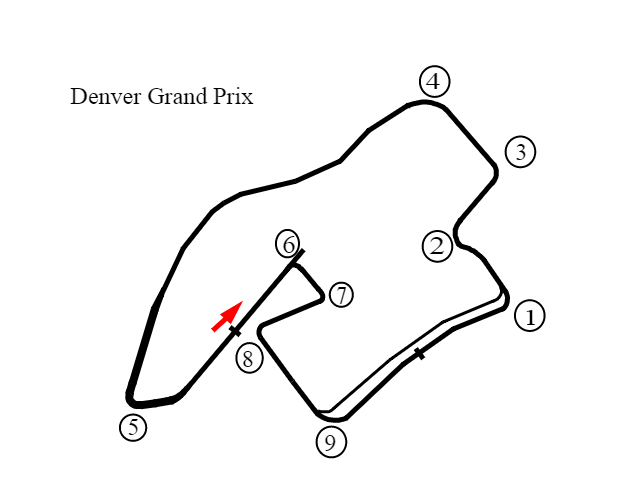
- Location: Denver, Colorado, USA; 39°44′48″N 105°0′23″W
- First race: 1990
- Last race: 2006
- Previous names: Texaco/Havoline Grand Prix of Denver (1990–1991); Shell Grand Prix of Denver (2002); Centrix Financial Grand Prix of Denver (2003–2005)
- Most wins (driver): Al Unser Jr. (2); Bruno Junqueira (2); Sébastien Bourdais (2)
- Most wins (team): Newman/Haas Racing (3)
- Most wins (manufacturer): Lola (7)

Circuit information
- Surface: Asphalt/concrete
- Length: 1.647 mi (2.651 km)
- Turns: 9 (Champ Car 2006 version)

The Grand Prix of Denver was a Champ Car race last held on a street circuit in Denver, Colorado, United States. A Champ Car race was first held in Denver in 1909 on a 14.500 mi (23.335 km) road circuit in nearby Brighton. Racing returned to the Centennial Park dirt oval in 1951 and 1952 under AAA sanctioning. In 1990, Champ Cars returned to Denver with a CART-sanctioned event downtown near the Civic Center. However, like the previous incarnation, that race also lasted only two years. CART returned to Denver in 2002 with a race on a 1.647 mi (2.651 km) temporary circuit around the then-named Pepsi Center. The final race was held in 2006. Champ Car initially put the race on its 2007 schedule but removed it after conflicts with other events could not be reconciled. Attempts to revive the event did not come to fruition.

== Winners ==
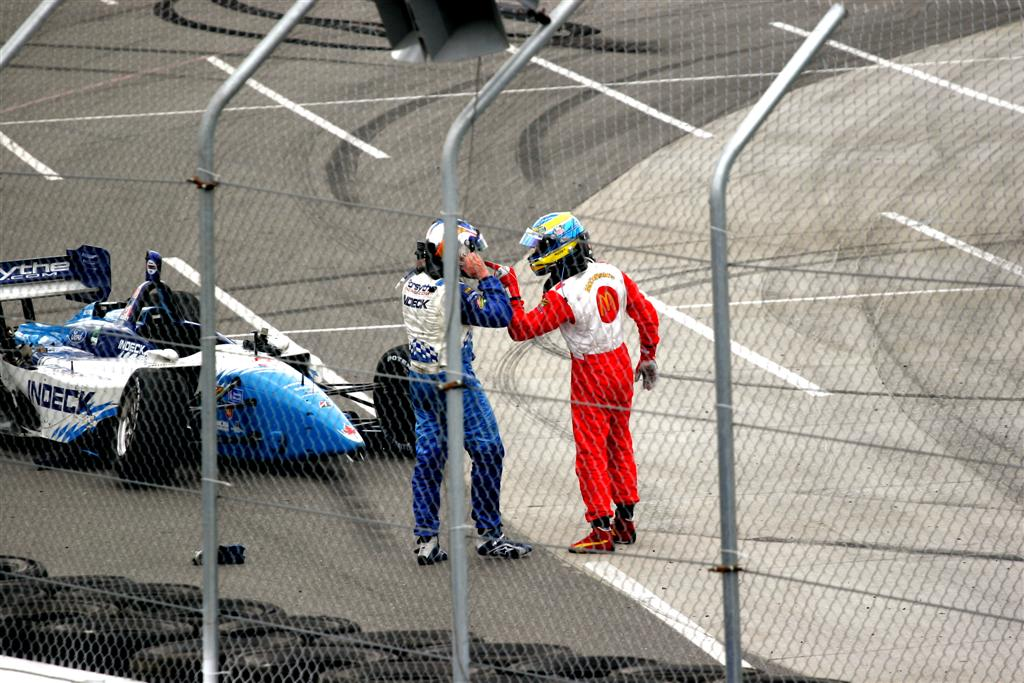
Paul Tracy and Sébastien Bourdais in a confrontation at the 2006 Denver Grand Prix

=== AAA Championship Car results ===
Season	Date	Winning driver	Chassis	Engine
1909 (Note: Non-championship race.)	July 5	(United States) Eaton McMillan	Colburn	
1910–1950: not held
1951	September 23	(United States) Tony Bettenhausen	Kurtis Kraft	Offy
1952	September 28	(United States) Bill Vukovich	Kuzma	Offy

=== CART/Champ Car World Series results ===
Season	Date	Winning driver	Chassis	Engine	Team	Report
1990	August 26	(United States) Al Unser Jr.	Lola	Chevrolet-Ilmor	Galles/Kraco Racing	Report
1991	August 25	(United States) Al Unser Jr.	Lola	Chevrolet-Ilmor	Galles/Kraco Racing	Report
1992–2001: Not held
2002	September 1	(Brazil) Bruno Junqueira	Lola	Toyota	Chip Ganassi Racing	Report
2003	August 31	(Brazil) Bruno Junqueira	Lola	Ford-Cosworth	Newman/Haas Racing	Report
2004	August 15	(France) Sébastien Bourdais	Lola	Ford-Cosworth	Newman/Haas Racing	Report
2005	August 14	(France) Sébastien Bourdais	Lola	Ford-Cosworth	Newman/Haas Racing	Report
2006	August 13	(United States) A. J. Allmendinger	Lola	Ford-Cosworth	Forsythe Racing	Report

=== Lap records ===
The fastest outright all-time track record set during a race weekend on the original layout is 1:25.896, set by Michael Andretti in a Lola T91/00, during qualifying for the 1991 Texaco/Havoline Grand Prix of Denver. The fastest outright all-time track record set during a race weekend on the second layout is 0:59.096 seconds, set by Sebastien Bourdais in a Lola B02/00, during qualifying for the 2006 Grand Prix of Denver. The fastest official race lap records at the Grand Prix of Denver are listed as:

Category	Time	Driver	Vehicle	Event	Track Map
Second Grand Prix Circuit (Pepsi Center) (2002–2006): 1.647 mi (2.651 km)
Champ Car	1:00.314	Sebastien Bourdais	Lola B02/00	2006 Grand Prix of Denver	
Formula Atlantic	1:06.945	Graham Rahal	Swift 016.a	2006 Denver Formula Atlantic round	
Formula BMW	1:14.854	Ryan Phinny	Mygale FB02	2006 Denver Formula BMW USA round	
Super Touring	1:21.119	Adam Pecorari	Audi A4	2006 Denver Speed World Challenge round	
Original Grand Prix Circuit (Denver Civic Center) (1990–1991): 1.900 mi (3.058 km)
CART	1:25.896	Michael Andretti	Lola T91/00	1991 Texaco/Havoline Grand Prix of Denver	
Indy Lights	1:36.612	P. J. Jones	Wildcat-Buick	1991 Denver Indy Lights round	
Trans-Am	1:42.050	Irv Hoerr	Oldsmobile Cutlass	1991 Texaco/Havoline Grand Prix of Denver	
