= Tecate/Telmex Grand Prix of Monterrey =

Former race in Monterrey, Nuevo León

Coordinates: 25°40′41″N 100°17′00″W

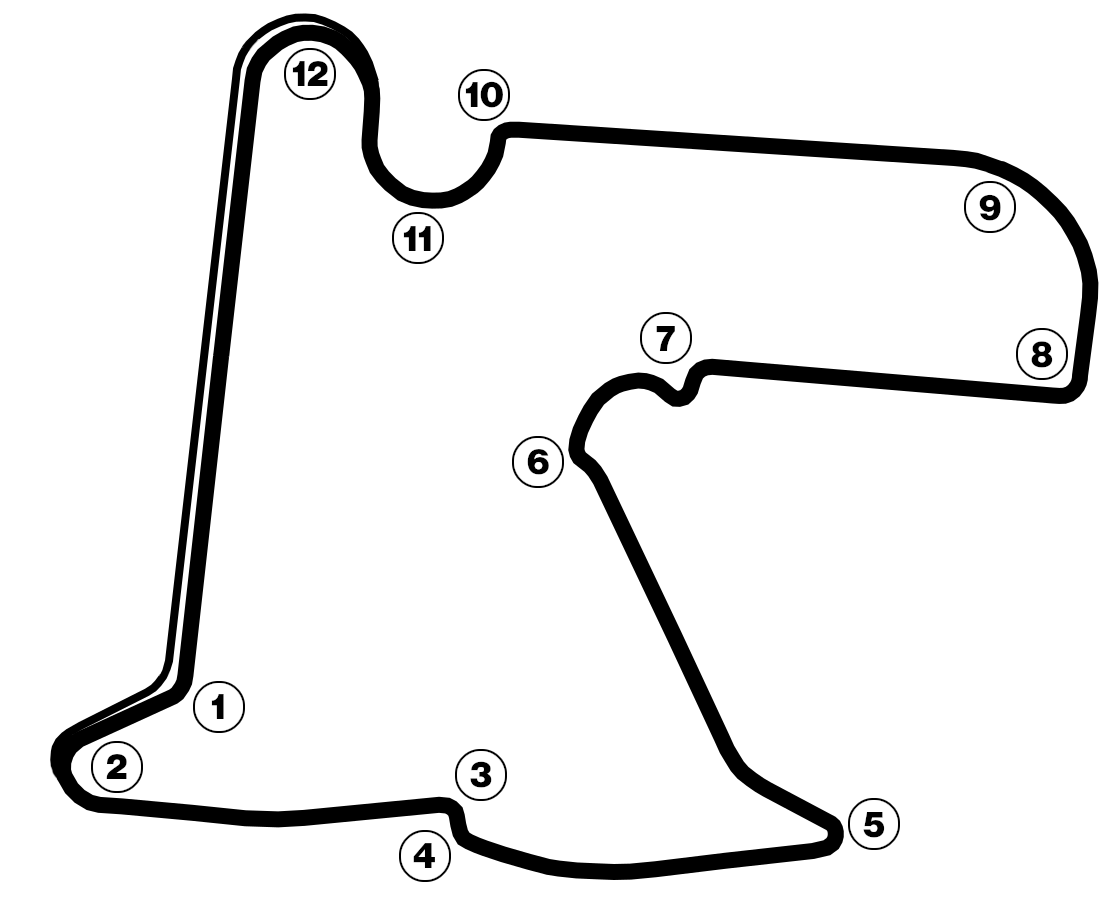

Champ Car World Series
- Venue: Fundidora Park Raceway
- Corporate sponsor: Tecate, Telmex
- First race: 2001
- Last race: 2006
- Duration: 1 hour, 45 minutes
- Most wins (driver): Sébastien Bourdais (2); Cristiano da Matta (2)
- Most wins (team): Newman/Haas Racing (5)
- Most wins (manufacturer): Lola (6)

Circuit information
- Surface: Asphalt
- Turns: 15

The Tecate/Telmex Grand Prix of Monterrey was a round of the Champ Car World Series held on a street circuit at Fundidora Park in Monterrey, Mexico. It was first held in 2001 and for the last time in 2006.

== Results ==
Season	Date	Driver	Team	Chassis	Engine	Race Distance		Race Time	Average Speed (mph)	Report	Refs
Season	Date	Driver	Team	Chassis	Engine	Laps	Miles (km)	Race Time	Average Speed (mph)	Report	Refs
2001	March 11	(Brazil) Cristiano da Matta	Newman/Haas Racing	Lola	Toyota	78*	164.19 (264.42)	2:00:44	81.548	Report	
2002	March 10	(Brazil) Cristiano da Matta	Newman/Haas Racing	Lola	Toyota	85	178.84 (287.81)	1:58:30	90.544	Report	
2003	March 23	(Canada) Paul Tracy	Forsythe Racing	Lola	Ford-Cosworth	85	178.84 (287.81)	2:03:04	87.184	Report	
2004	May 23	(France) Sébastien Bourdais	Newman/Haas Racing	Lola	Ford-Cosworth	72	151.488 (243.792)	1:45:01	86.544	Report	
2005	May 22	(Brazil) Bruno Junqueira	Newman/Haas Racing	Lola	Ford-Cosworth	76	159.904 (257.336)	2:03:38	77.602	Report	
2006	May 21	(France) Sébastien Bourdais	Newman/Haas Racing	Lola	Ford-Cosworth	76	159.904 (257.336)	1:39:50	96.099	Report	

- 2001: Race shortened due to two hour time limit.
