= Jaguar in motorsport =

The Jaguar brand currently competes in Formula E under the name Jaguar TCS Racing for sponsorship reasons. It won the 2023–24 and 2025–26 Formula E World Teams' Championships.

From 2000 to 2004, Jaguar competed in Formula One. Its best finish was in the Constructors' Championship was 7th, which it achieved three times, from 2002 to 2004. The team was subsequently sold to Red Bull, which renamed the team to Red Bull Racing.

The Jaguar brand also has rich history in various forms of sportscar racing, most notably with the C-Type, D-Type, and E-Type at the 24 Hours of Le Mans during the 1950s and 1960s, as well as the XJR sportscars in the FIA World Sportscar Championship and IMSA GT Championship during the late 1980s and early 1990s.

== Sports car racing ==
=== XJR sportscars ===
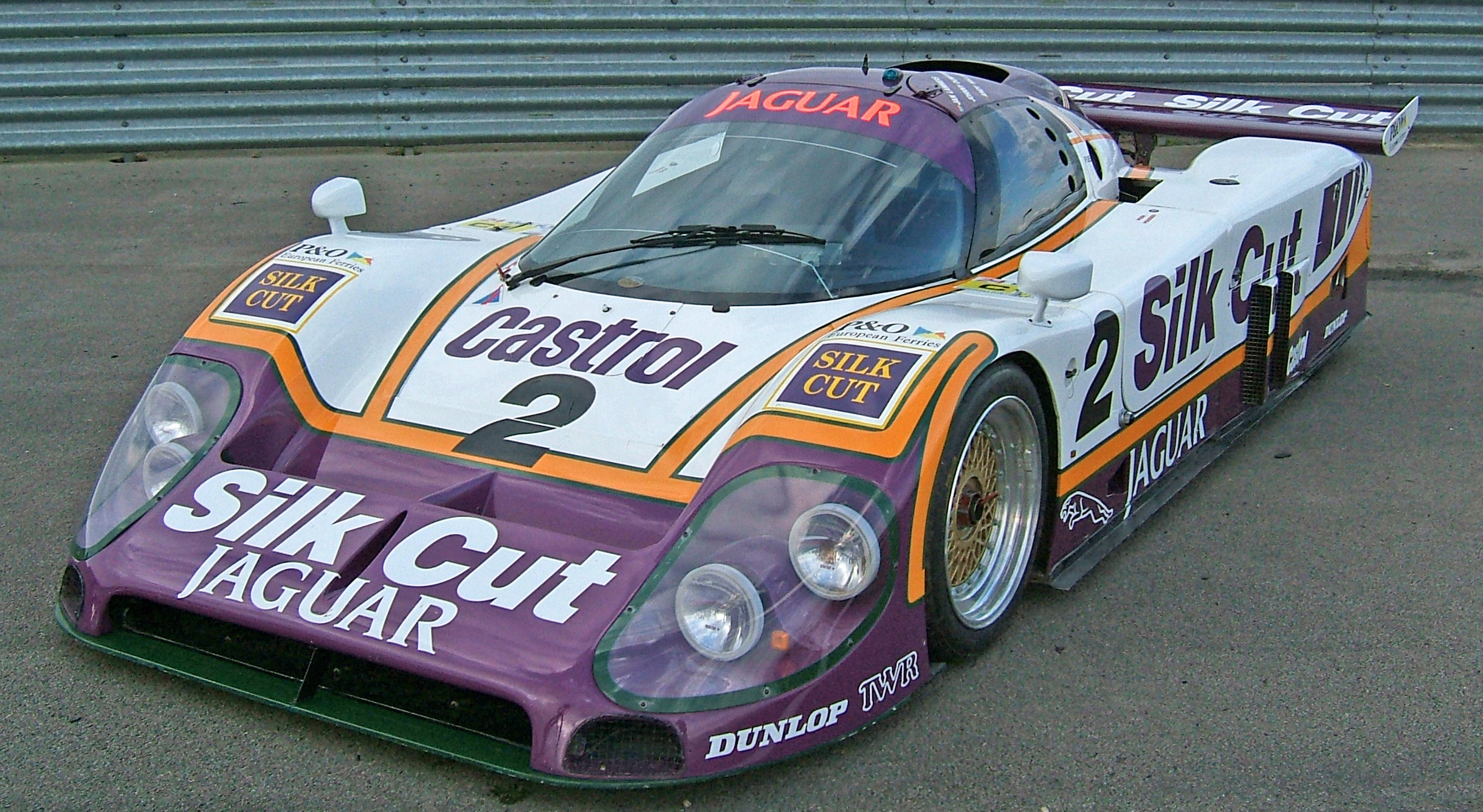
The XJR-9 won the 1988 24 Hours of Le Mans, 24 Hours of Daytona and the 2010 Le Mans Legend.

The Jaguar XJR sportscars were a series of sports prototypes that competed in the World Sportscar Championship and IMSA GT Championship between 1984 and 1993. These cars enjoyed high success, with some of the highlights being:

- Silk Cut Jaguar winning the 1987 World Sportscar Championship with the XJR-8;
- Silk Cut Jaguar winning the 1988 World Sportscar Championship, including the 24 Hours of Le Mans, with the XJR-9;
- Castrol Jaguar winning the 1988 24 Hours of Daytona with the XJR-9;
- Silk Cut Jaguar winning the 1990 24 Hours of Le Mans with the XJR-12;
- Castrol Jaguar winning the 1990 24 Hours of Daytona with the XJR-12;
- Silk Cut Jaguar winning the 1991 World Sportscar Championship with the XJR-14 and XJR-12;
- Justin Law winning the 2008 and 2010 editions of Le Mans Legend with the XJR-12 and XJR-9 respectively.

=== GT2 ===
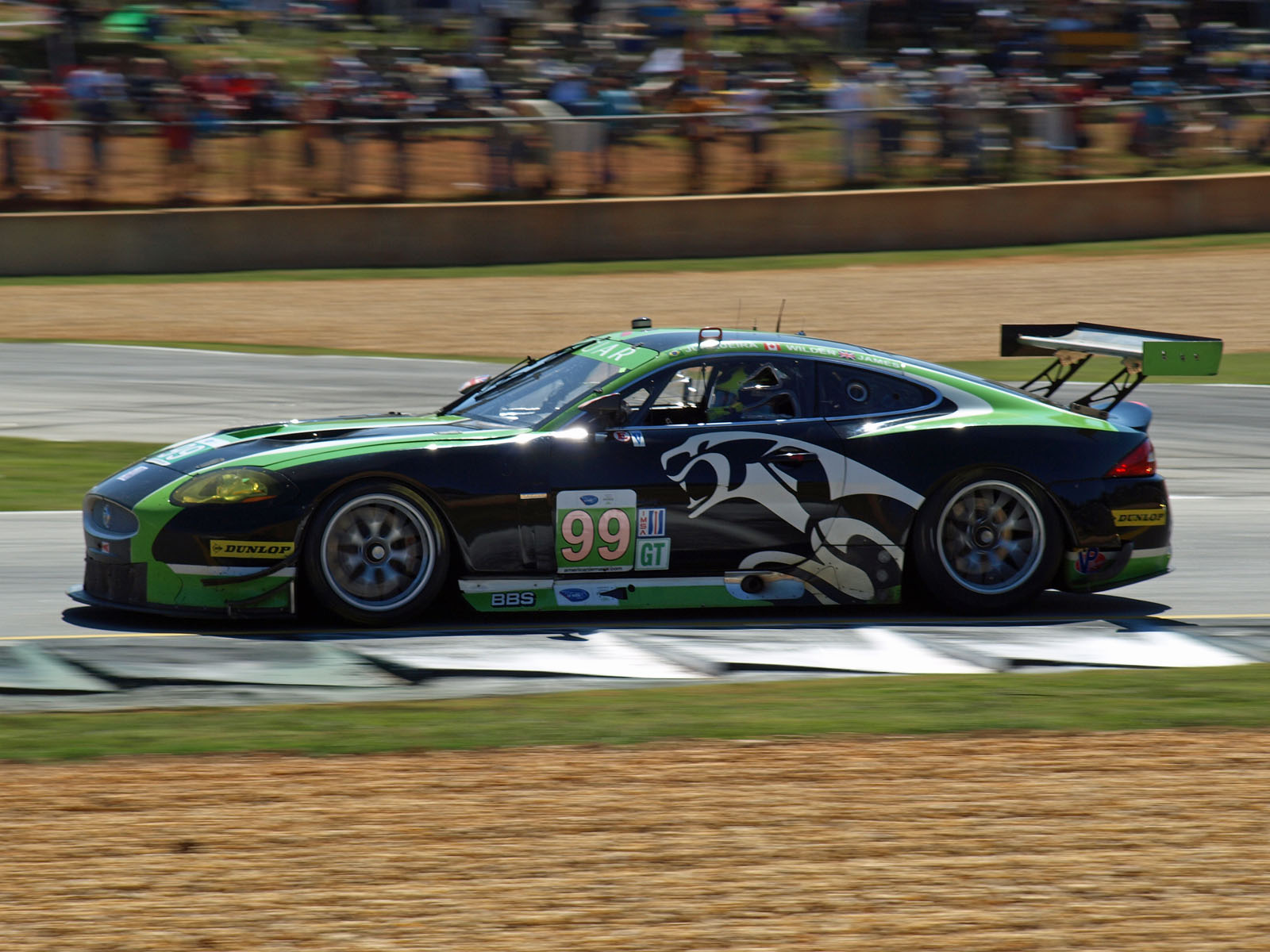
RSR Racing competing at the 2011 Petit Le Mans with Jaguar XKR GT2.

In 2009, RSR Racing revealed the new Jaguar XKR GT2 car, which the team was to enter the American Le Mans Series' GT2 class with.

RSR first raced the XKR in the 2010 American Le Mans Series with Paul Gentilozzi, Ryan Dalziel and Marc Goossens. They finished last in the GT class with five points. They also visited that year's 24 Hours of Le Mans, but retired early into the race. The team then entered another season in the American Le Mans Series with Cristiano da Matta and Bruno Junqueira, this time finishing ninth (second last) with six points.

=== GT3 ===
The first GT3 iteration of the XKR was developed by Apex Motorsport, which ran these cars in the FIA GT3 European Championship (from 2007 to 2009).

Jaguar then had a fairly long run in the Blancpain GT Series, with the Switzerland-based racing outfit Emil Frey Racing fielding multiple Jaguar XK Emil Frey G3 cars. Those were an in-house development by Emil Frey Racing, with approval from Jaguar, that conformed to full FIA GT3 regulations. The car debuted in the 2012 Blancpain Endurance Series and finished its run in the 2018 Blancpain GT Series Endurance Cup. For its farewell season, the car was moved to the Silver Cup and won the championship with the lineup of Alex Fontana, Mikaël Grenier and Adrian Zaugg. It was also third overall in the Endurance Cup Team Rankings. In the previous seasons, the XKRs were run exclusively in the Pro Cup, with the team fielding two cars instead of one in the 2016 and 2017 seasons.

=== GT4 ===
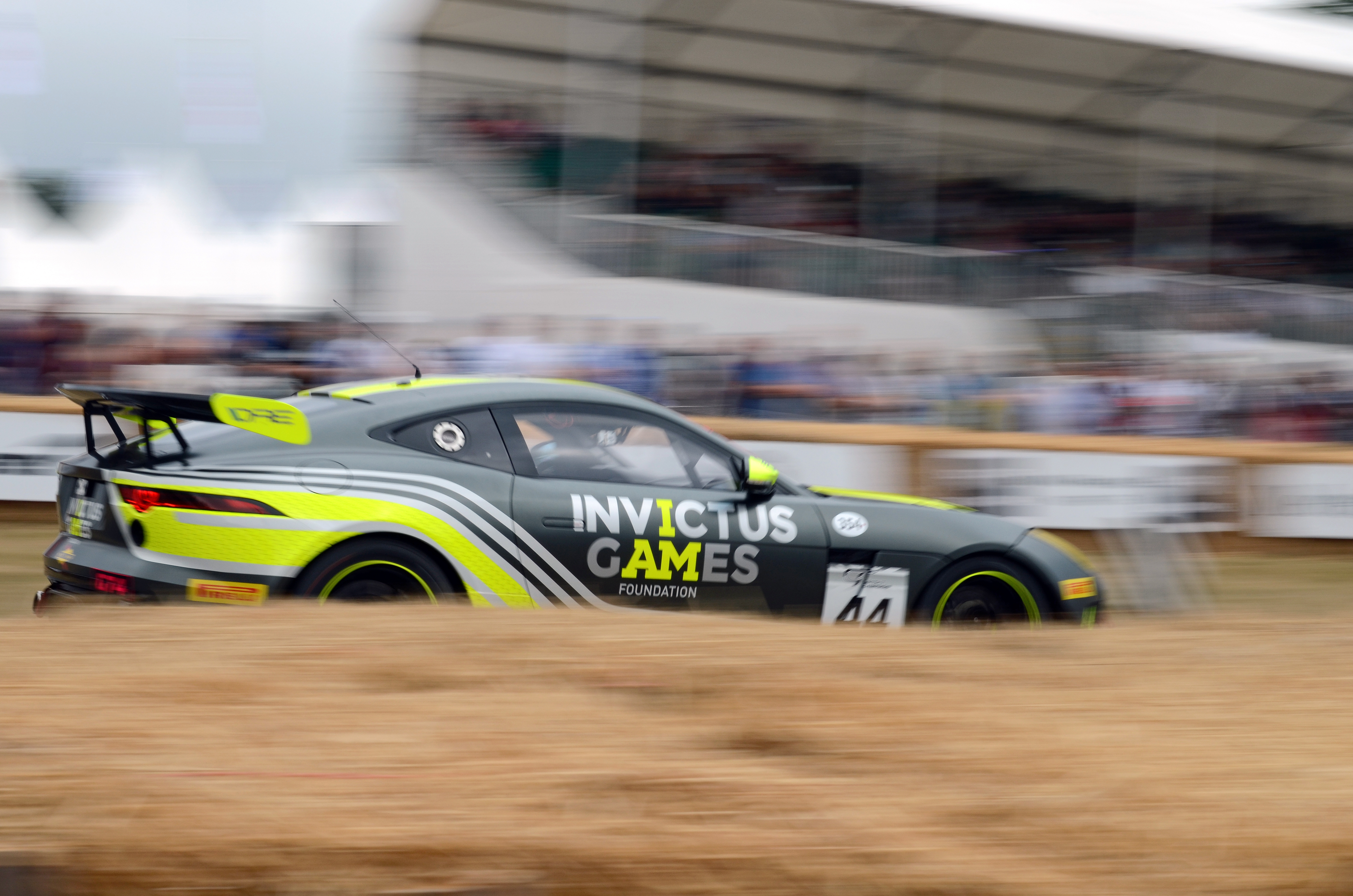
Invictus Games Racing presenting their Jaguar F-Type SVR GT4 at the 2018 Goodwood Festival of Speed.

A new entry to the British GT Championship, named Invictus Games Racing and financed by James Holder, fielded two new Jaguar cars for the 2018 season. Despite conforming to standard GT4 regulations, the Jaguar F-Type SVR GT4 was run exclusively in British GT and was not expected to be made available to other customers. The GT4 iteration was developed by Jaguar Land Rover's SVO division.

Invictus ran two cars in the 2018 season, both in Pro-Am class. Jason Wolfe and Matthew George were the full-time professional drivers of these cars, while Steve McCulley, Paul Vice, Ben Norfolk and Basil Rawlinson have been selected as the amateur drivers. The entry was reduced to a single car for the 2019 season, with George, McCulley and Vice staying in the team.

The Invictus team disbanded prior to the 2020 season. In February 2020, both cars along with spare parts were auctioned via Silverstone Auctions and eventually sold for £213,750.

== Racecars ==
Year	Car	Image	Category
1951	Jaguar C-Type		Competition-Sports car
1954	Jaguar D-Type		Sports racing car
1962	Jaguar E-Type		Sports car
1983	Jaguar XJR-5		IMSA GTP
1985	Jaguar XJR-6		Group C1
1985	Jaguar XJR-7		IMSA GTP
1987	Jaguar XJR-8		Group C1
1988	Jaguar XJR-9		Group C1
1988	Jaguar XJS		Group B
1989	Jaguar XJR-10		IMSA GTP
1990	Jaguar XJR-11		Group C1
1990	Jaguar XJR-12		Group C1
1991	Jaguar XJR-14		Group C1
1991	Jaguar XJR-16		IMSA GTP
1992	Jaguar XJR-17		Group C1
1995	Jaguar XJ220		Group GT2
1996	Jaguar XJ220 GT		Group GT1
2000	Jaguar R1		Formula One
2001	Jaguar R2		Formula One
2002	Jaguar R3		Formula One
2003	Jaguar R4		Formula One
2004	Jaguar R5		Formula One
2009	Jaguar XKR		TA
2010	Jaguar XKR		LM GTE
2016	Jaguar I-Type 1		Formula E
2017	Jaguar I-Type 2		Formula E
2018	Jaguar I-Type 3		Formula E
2018	Jaguar I-Pace eTrophy		Jaguar I-Pace eTrophy
2019	Jaguar I-Type 4		Formula E
2020	Jaguar I-Type 5		Formula E
2022	Jaguar I-Type 6		Formula E
2024	Jaguar I-Type 7		Formula E
