= Jaguar XJR-17 =

- Category: IMSA Lights/Group C2
- Constructor: Tom Walkinshaw Racing
- Designer(s): David Fullerton

Technical specifications
- Chassis: Carbon fibre and aluminium honeycomb monocoque
- Suspension (front): double wishbones, coil springs actuated by pushrods, dampers and anti-roll bar
- Suspension (rear): double wishbones, coil springs actuated by pushrods, dampers and anti-roll bar
- Engine: Jaguar JRV-6 3,498 cc (213.5 cu in) 24 valve, DOHC V6, naturally-aspirated Mid engined, longitudinally mounted
- Transmission: 5-speed TWR manual

Competition history

The Jaguar XJR-17 was an IMSA Lights racing car, built by Tom Walkinshaw Racing. Rebuilt from a Jaguar XJR-16 for the IMSA Camel Lights, the XJR-17 never competed in the event due to funding issues and has since only been used in a few minor British events and historic races. It used a modified version of the XJR-16's 3.5-litre V6 engine, stripped of the twin-turbochargers and producing a claimed output of 450 hp (336 kW; 456 PS), whilst its bodywork was cobbled together using various parts from older Jaguar XJR Sportscars.

== Design and development ==
Andy Evans approached Tom Walkinshaw Racing (TWR) about the possibility of running a full-works IMSA GTP Jaguar sports prototype for the 1991 IMSA GT Championship season, but such a deal proved unworkable. However, as TWR were winding down their project, a deal was struck to instead strip down a Jaguar XJR-16 for use in the IMSA Camel Lights championship. David Fullerton designed the car, dubbed the XJR-17, whilst TWR SVO and Andy Morrison were the constructors. The XJR-16 chassis was stripped down to reduce cost and parts from various Jaguar XJR Sportscars were installed: the front wing came from the XJR-14, the rear wing came from one of the XJR-9, the gearbox casing was a mixture of XJR-11 tunnels and the XJR-16's bellhousing, and the nose was remodelled in the style of the XJR-14, as was the engine inlet. The engine was essentially the XJR-16's 3.5-litre V6, but with the twin-turbochargers removed; in this configuration, it produced a claimed 450 hp (336 kW; 456 PS).

Win Percy gave the XJR-17 its first shakedown at Enstone Airfield before a test session was held at Snetterton. However, the deal collapsed, and Hugh Chamberlain instead was to use the car as a Group C2 entrant in the 1992 24 Hours of Le Mans. Chamberlain, however, was also unable to get enough funding to compete, and the car, already prepared for the Le Mans qualifying session, was not used in the event. The XJR-17 eventually ended up in the hands of Brian Chatfield, who ran the car in a few minor races held at Castle Combe in 1993 and 1994, whilst racing driver John Grant used it in some races from 2003 until 2004.

== See also ==
- Jaguar XJR Sportscars
