= 1993 24 Hours of Daytona =

Previous: 1992	Next: 1994
Index: Races | Winners

Track map of Daytona International Speedway

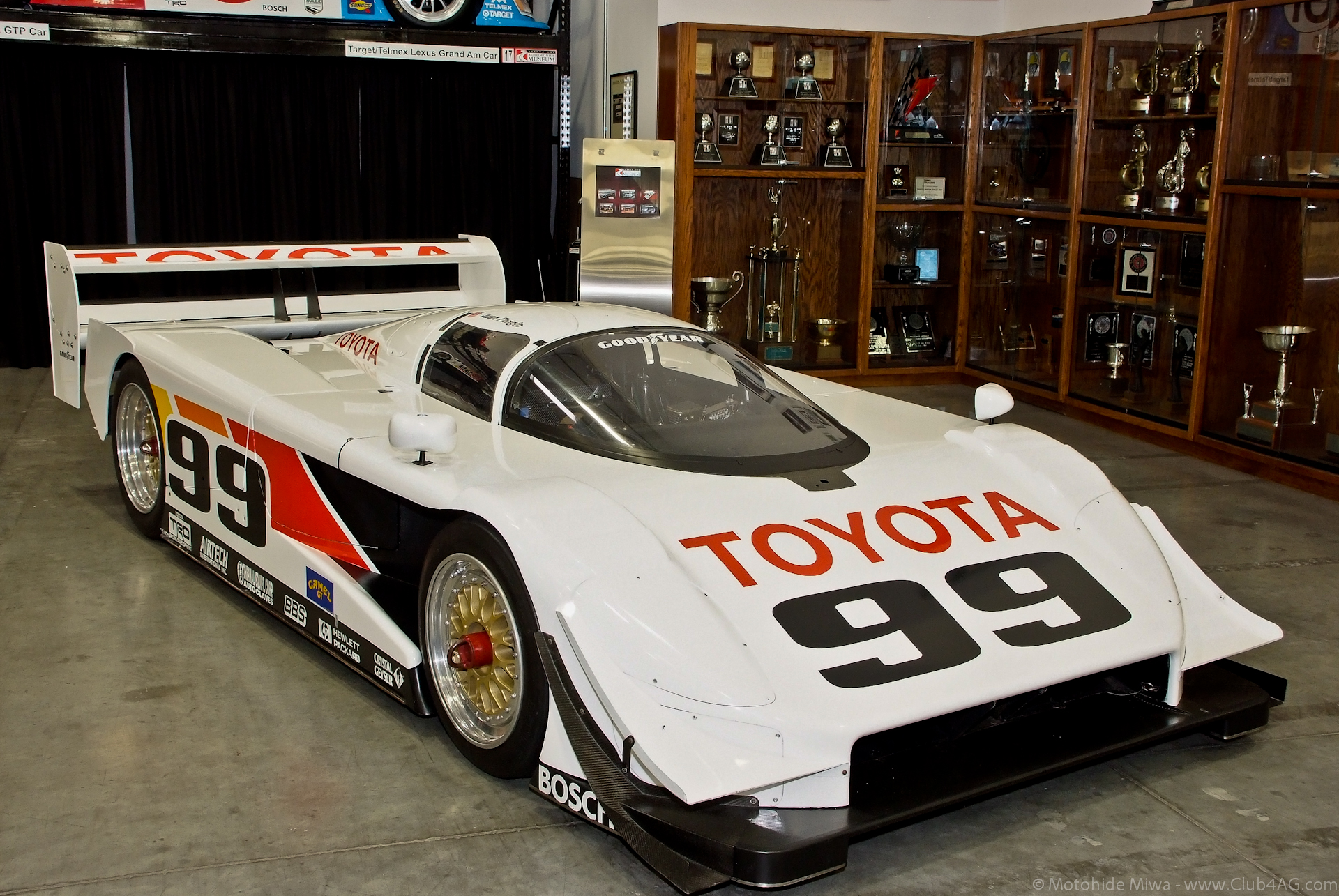
The No. 99 sister car of the race winning car.

The 1993 Rolex 24 at Daytona was a 24-hour endurance sports car race held on January 30–31, 1993 at the Daytona International Speedway road course. The race served as the opening round of the 1993 IMSA GT Championship.

Victory overall and in the GTP class went to the No. 98 All American Racers Eagle MkIII driven by P. J. Jones, Rocky Moran, and Mark Dismore. Victory in the LM class went to the No. 2 Jaguar Racing Jaguar XJR-12 driven by Scott Goodyear, Scott Pruett, and Davy Jones. Victory in the GTS class went to the No. 11 Roush Racing Ford Mustang driven by Wally Dallenbach Jr., Robby Gordon, Robbie Buhl, and Tommy Kendall. Victory in the Lights class went to the No. 36 Erie Scientific Company Kudzu DG-1 driven by John Grooms, Frank Jellinek, Jim Downing, and Tim McAdam. Victory in the GTU class went to the No. 82 Wendy's Racing Team Mazda RX-7 driven by Dick Greer, Al Bacon, Peter Uria, and Mike Mees. Finally, victory in the INV GT class went to the No. 28 Cigarette Racing Porsche 964 Carrera driven by Enzo Calderari, Luigino Pagotto, Sandro Angelastri, and Ronny Meixner.

== Race results ==
Class winners in bold.

Pos	Class	No	Team	Drivers	Car	Laps
1	**GTP**	**98**	(United States) **All American Racers**	(United States) **P. J. Jones** (United States) **Rocky Moran** (United States) **Mark Dismore**	**Eagle MkIII**	**698**
2	**GTS**	**11**	(United States) **Roush Racing**	(United States) **Wally Dallenbach Jr.** (United States) **Robby Gordon** (United States) **Robbie Buhl** (United States) **Tommy Kendall**	**Ford Mustang**	**688**
3	GTS	15	(United States) Roush Racing	(United States) John Fergus (United States) Jim Stevens (United States) Mark Martin	Ford Mustang	686
4	GTS	1	(United States) Cunningham Racing	(United States) John Morton (United States) Johnny O'Connell (New Zealand) Steve Millen	Nissan 300ZX Turbo	668
5	GTP	16	(United States) Dyson Racing	(United Kingdom) James Weaver (United States) Rob Dyson (United States) Price Cobb (United States) Elliott Forbes-Robinson	Porsche 962	655
6 DNF	GTP	30	(Italy) Momo	(Italy) Giampiero Moretti (United Kingdom) Derek Bell (Italy) Massimo Sigala (United States) John Paul Jr.	Nissan NPT-90	645
7	**Lights**	**36**	(United States) **Erie Scientific Company**	(United States) **John Grooms** (United States) **Frank Jellinek** (United States) **Jim Downing** (United States) **Tim McAdam**	**Kudzu DG-1**	**645**
8	GTS	17	(United States) Roush Racing	(United States) Jon Gooding (United States) Joe Pezza (United States) Bill Cooper	Ford Mustang	638
9	**GTU**	**82**	(United States) **Wendy's Racing Team**	(United States) **Dick Greer** (United States) **Al Bacon** (United States) **Peter Uria** (United States) **Mike Mees**	**Mazda RX-7**	**623**
10	**LM**	**2**	(United Kingdom) **Jaguar Racing**	(Canada) **Scott Goodyear** (United States) **Scott Pruett** (United States) **Davy Jones**	**Jaguar XJR-12**	**618**
11	**INV GT**	**28**	(Germany) **Cigarette Racing**	(Switzerland) **Enzo Calderari** (Italy) **Luigino Pagotto** (Switzerland) **Sandro Angelastri** (Germany) **Ronny Meixner**	**Porsche 964 Carrera**	**618**
12	Lights	71	(United States) Club Zed Motorsports	(United States) Peter Harholdt (Canada) Rob Mingay (United States) Joseph Hamilton (Canada) Ross Bentley (United States) John Mirro	Tiga GT286	615
13	INV GT	27	(Germany) Porsche Club Hildesheim	(Germany) Edgar Dören (Germany) Oliver Mathai (Germany) Wolfgang Mathai	Porsche 964 Carrera	596
14	INV GT	41	(Germany) Bernt Motorsport	(Germany) Stig Amthor (Italy) Alfio Marchini (Belgium) Philippe de Craene (Germany) Andreas Fuchs	Porsche 964 Carrera	587
15	GTU	58	(United States) Pro-Technik Racing	(United States) Anthony Lazzaro (United States) Andre Toennis (Switzerland) Omar Daniel (United States) Alex Tradd (United States) Frank Beard (United States) Sam Shalala	Porsche 911	577
16 DNF	INV GT	48	(United States) Dave Maraj	(Germany) Oliver Kuttner (United States) Danny Marshall (United States) Weldon Scrogham (United States) John Biggs	Porsche 964 Carrera	572
17 DNF	INV GT	5	(United States) Mercruiser	(United States) Peter Cunningham (United States) Boris Said (United States) Shawn Hendricks (United States) Lou Gigliotti (United States) Jim Minneker	Chevrolet Corvette	570
18 DNF	GTS	22	(United States) John Josey	(United States) Daniel Urrutia (United States) Craig Rubright (United States) Gene Whipp (United States) John Josey	Chevrolet Camaro	551
19	INV GT	92	(United States) Scott Clarke	(United States) Paul Lewis (Canada) Ludwig Heimrath Jr. (United States) Paul Reisman (United States) Leigh Miller (United States) John Reisman	Porsche 944 Turbo	549
20 DNF	Lights	45	(United States) Scandia Engineering	(Spain) Fermín Vélez (United States) John Marconi (United States) Tom Hessert Jr. (United States) Don Bell	Kudzu DG-2	546
21	GTS	21	(United States) Bruce Trenery	(United States) Bruce Trenery (United States) Larry Less (Australia) Andrew Osman (United States) Kent Painter	Chevrolet Camaro	537
22	GTS	87	(United States) John Annis Racing	(United States) John Annis (United States) Robert Kirkland (United States) Louis Beall (United States) Dick Downs (United States) Bob Deeks (United States) Eddie Sharp	Chevrolet Camaro	529
23	GTU	95	(United States) Leitzinger Racing	(United States) Butch Leitzinger (United States) Bob Leitzinger (United States) Chuck Kurtz	Nissan 240SX	528
24	Lights	42	(United States) Pro-Technik Racing	(United States) Buddy Lazier (United States) Sam Shalala (United States) Mike Sheehan (United States) Chris Ivey (United States) Anthony Lazzaro	Fabcar CL	523
25	GTS	25	Team Argentina/K.R.E.	(Argentina) Jorge Oyhanart (Argentina) Emilio Satriano (Argentina) Fabian Acuña (Argentina) Eduardo Ramos (Argentina) Hugo Mazzacane	Oldsmobile Cutlass	500
26 DNF	GTU	08	(Ecuador) Henry Taleb Racing	(Ecuador) Henry Taleb (Ecuador) Alfonso Adarquea (Ecuador) Marcelo Adarquea (Ecuador) Ignacio Escobar	Nissan 300ZX	491
27 DNF	GTP	99	(United States) All American Racers	(Argentina) Juan Manuel Fangio II (United Kingdom) Andy Wallace (United Kingdom) Kenny Acheson	Eagle MkIII	481
28 DNF	Lights	44	(United States) Scandia Engineering	(United States) Andy Evans (United States) Charles Morgan (United States) Lon Bender	Kudzu DG-2	461
29 DNF	GTS	90	(United States) Les Delano	(United States) Andy Petery (United States) Steve Fossett (United States) Gary Stewart (United States) Les Delano	Pontiac Firebird	438
30	GTU	26	(United States) Alex Job Racing	(United States) Mark Sandridge (United States) Butch Hamlet (United States) Charles Slater	Porsche 911	435
31	GTU	24	(Peru) Dibos Racing	(Peru) Juan Dibos (Peru) Eduardo Dibós Chappuis (Peru) Raúl Orlandini	Mazda MX-6	435
32 DNF	GTS	50	(United States) Overbagh Racing	(United States) Oma Kimbrough (United States) Robert McElheny (United States) Bob Hundredmark (United States) Mark Montgomery (United States) David Kicak (United States) Hoyt Overbagh	Chevrolet Camaro	433
33	INV GT	94	(United States) Morrison Motorsports	(United States) John Heinricy (United States) Stu Hayner (United States) Andy Pilgrim (United States) Don Knowles	Chevrolet Corvette	432
34	GTU	39	(United States) Charles Wagner	(United States) Bill Auberlen (United States) Mike Graham (United States) Dave Russell	Mazda MX-6	430
35	GTS	23	Team Argentina/K.R.E.	(Argentina) Oscar Aventin (Argentina) Juan Landa (Argentina) Osvaldo Morresi (Argentina) Osvaldo López	Oldsmobile Cutlass	425
36 DNF	GTU	12	(United States) Support Net Racing	(United States) Henry Camferdam (United States) Dan Robson (United States) Gary Drummond	Mazda MX-6	414
37 DNF	GTS	76	(United States) Cunningham Racing	(Australia) Geoff Brabham (United States) David Loring (United States) Dominic Dobson (United States) Tommy Riggins	Nissan 300ZX Turbo	332
38 DNF	GTU	73	(United States) Jack Lewis Enterprises Ltd.	(United States) Stephen Hynes (United States) Jack Lewis (United States) Joe Cogbill	Porsche 911 Carrera RSR	293
39	Lights	10	(United States) John Macaluso	(United States) John Macaluso (Canada) Ed de Long (Canada) Nick Holmes (United States) Bruce MacInnes	Tiga GT286	278
40 DNF	GTP	66	(United States) Team Gunnar	(United States) Dennis Aase (El Salvador) Carlos Moran (United States) Chip Hanauer (United States) Jay Cochran (United States) Bobby Carradine	Gunnar 966	271
41 DNF	GTP	6	(Germany) Joest Porsche	(United States) Chip Robinson (United States) Hurley Haywood (France) Henri Pescarolo (United States) Danny Sullivan	Porsche 962	258
42	GTU	57	(United States) Kryderacing	(United States) Frank Del Vecchio (United States) Joe Danaher (France) Guy Kuster (United States) Reed Kryder	Nissan 240SX	255
43	INV GT	93	(United States) Morrison Motorsports	(United States) Del Percilla (United States) Andy Pilgrim (United States) Danny Kellermeyer (United States) Scott Allman (United States) Ron Nelson (United States) John Heinricy (United States) Stu Hayner	Chevrolet Corvette	250
44 DNF	GTS	81	(United States) Mark Kennedy	(United States) Mark Kennedy (United States) Jeff Purvis (United States) Hugh Fuller (United States) Jeff Swindel (United States) Mike Joy	Chevrolet Camaro	231
45	GTS	07	(United States) Don Arpin	(United States) Tim Banks (United States) Paul Reckert (United States) Don Arpin	Chevrolet Camaro	213
46 DNF	GTP	7	(Germany) Joest Porsche	(France) Bob Wollek (Germany) Manuel Reuter (Germany) Frank Jelinski (Germany) "John Winter"	Porsche 962	190
47 DNF	GTS	18	(United States) Tom Gloy Racing	(Canada) Ron Fellows (Japan) Tomiko Yoshikawa (Canada) Pieter Baljet (South Africa) Desiré Wilson	Ford Mustang	189
48 DNF	GTS	67	(United States) Kendall Oil Company	(Argentina) Paul Mazzacane (United States) Kenny Wallace (United States) Chester Edwards	Chevrolet Camaro	183
49 DNF	Lights	40	(Canada) Bieri Racing	(Canada) John Jones (United States) Paul Duckworth (Canada) Neil Jamieson (Canada) Ken Wilden (Canada) Jeff Lapcevich	Alba AR2/6	180
50	GTS	19	(United States) Anthony Puleo	(United States) Anthony Puleo (United States) William Wessel (United States) David Fuller (United States) Tim O'Brien	Chevrolet Camaro	174
51 DNF	GTP	20	(United States) Hotchkis Racing	(United States) Jim Adams (United States) Robert Kirby (United States) Chris Cord	Porsche 962	162
52 DNF	GTS	31	(United States) Rocketsports Racing	(United States) Dorsey Schroeder (United States) Jack Baldwin	Oldsmobile Cutlass	159
53 DNF	GTS	35	(United States) Bill McDill	(United States) Richard McDill (United States) Tom Juckette (United States) Bill McDill	Chevrolet Camaro	156
54 DNF	Lights	9	(United States) Brix Racing	(United States) Bob Earl (United States) Chris Smith (United States) Bob Schader	Spice AK93	152
55 DNF	GTS	51	(United States) Rocketsports Racing	(United Kingdom) Calvin Fish (United States) George Robinson	Oldsmobile Cutlass	113
56 DNF	INV GT	4	(United States) Mercruiser	(United States) R. J. Valentine (United States) Max Schmidt (United States) Jim Minneker (United States) Ken Payson (United States) Lou Gigliotti	Chevrolet Corvette	111
57 DNF	INV GT	01	(United States) Rohr Corporation	(United States) John O'Steen (United States) Larry Schumacher (United States) Jochen Rohr	Porsche 964 Carrera	103
58 DNF	LM	32	(United Kingdom) Jaguar Racing	(United States) Davy Jones (Australia) David Brabham (Denmark) John Nielsen (United States) John Andretti	Jaguar XJR-12	92
59 DNF	Lights	49	(United States) Comptech Racing	(United States) Parker Johnstone (United States) Steve Cameron (United States) Dan Marvin	Spice SE91P	24
60 DNF	LM	3	(United Kingdom) Jaguar Racing	(Denmark) John Nielsen (United States) Mario Andretti (Australia) David Brabham	Jaguar XJR-12	18
