= 1990 24 Hours of Daytona =

24-hour endurance sports car race

Previous: 1989	Next: 1991
Index: Races | Winners

Track map of Daytona International Speedway

The 1990 SunBank 24 at Daytona was a 24-hour endurance sports car race held on February 3–4, 1990 at the Daytona International Speedway road course. The race served as the opening round of the 1990 IMSA GT Championship.

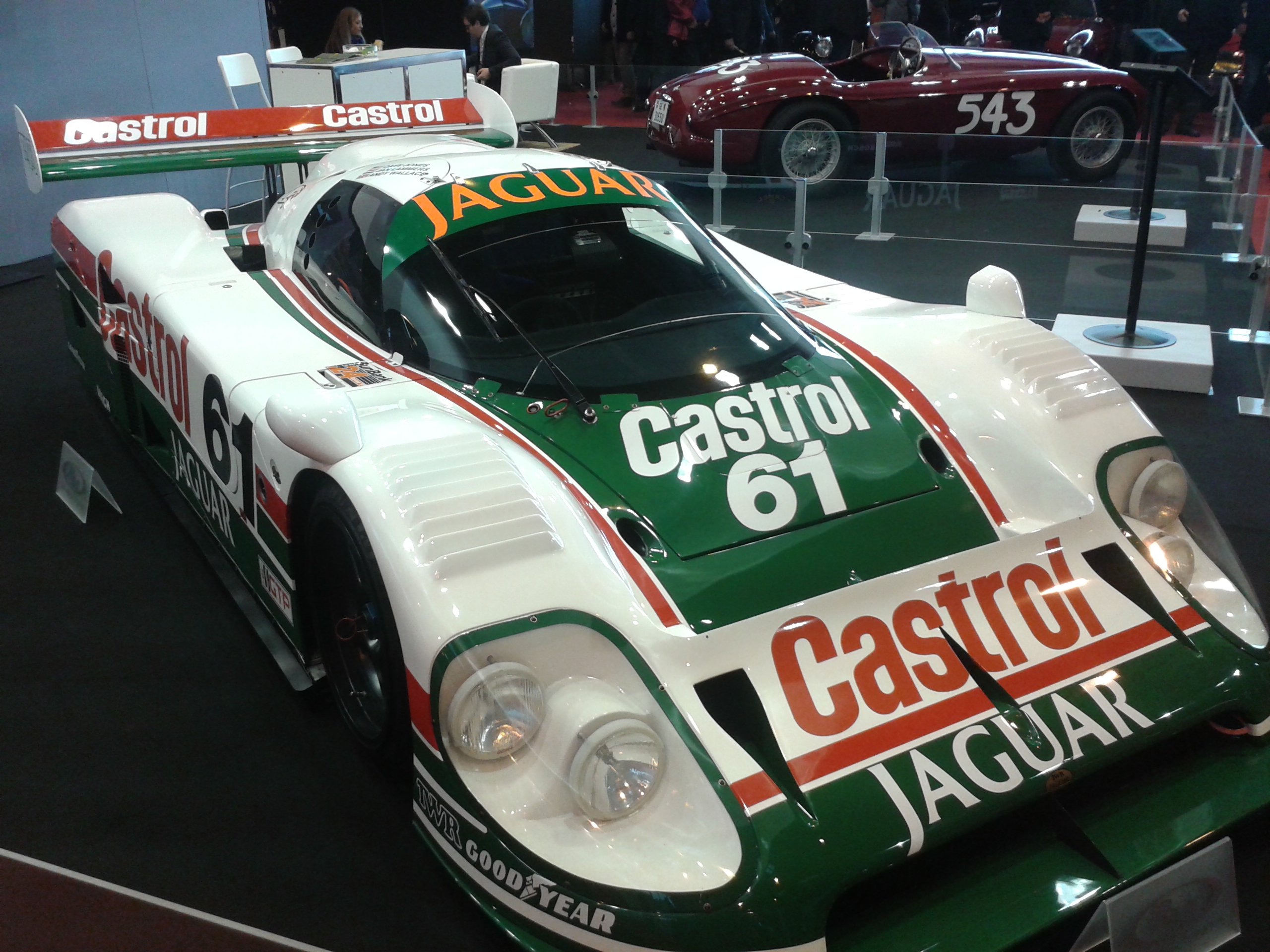
The overall winning Jaguar XJR-12

Victory overall and in the GTP class went to the No. 61 Castrol Jaguar Racing Jaguar XJR-12 driven by Davy Jones, Jan Lammers, and Andy Wallace. Victory in the GTP Lights class went to the No. 36 Erie Scientific Racing Argo JM16 driven by John Grooms, Michael Greenfield, and Frank Jellinek. The GTO class was won by the No. 15 Tru-Cur/Roush Racing Mercury Cougar XR-7 driven by Robby Gordon, Calvin Fish, and Lyn St. James. Finally, the GTU class was won by the No. 71 Peter Uria Racing Mazda RX-7 driven by Peter Uria, Bob Dotson, Jim Pace, and Rusty Scott.

== Race results ==
Class winners in bold.

Pos	Class	No	Team	Drivers	Chassis	Tyre	Laps
Pos	Class	No	Team	Drivers	Engine	Tyre	Laps
1	**GTP**	**61**	(United Kingdom) **Castrol Jaguar Racing**	(United States) **Davy Jones** (Netherlands) **Jan Lammers** (United Kingdom) **Andy Wallace**	**Jaguar XJR-12**	**G**	**761**
1	**GTP**	**61**	(United Kingdom) **Castrol Jaguar Racing**	(United States) **Davy Jones** (Netherlands) **Jan Lammers** (United Kingdom) **Andy Wallace**	Jaguar 6.0L V12 N/A	**G**	**761**
2	GTP	60	(United Kingdom) Castrol Jaguar Racing	(United States) Price Cobb (Denmark) John Nielsen (United Kingdom) Martin Brundle	Jaguar XJR-12	**G**	757
2	GTP	60	(United Kingdom) Castrol Jaguar Racing	(United States) Price Cobb (Denmark) John Nielsen (United Kingdom) Martin Brundle	Jaguar 6.0L V12 N/A	**G**	757
3	GTP	86	(United States) Texaco Havoline	(France) Bob Wollek (South Africa) Sarel van der Merwe (United States) Dominic Dobson	Porsche 962	**G**	755
3	GTP	86	(United States) Texaco Havoline	(France) Bob Wollek (South Africa) Sarel van der Merwe (United States) Dominic Dobson	Porsche 3.0L Flat 6 Twin Turbo	**G**	755
4	GTP	2	(United States) Alucraft/Shapiro Motorsports	(Germany) Hans-Joachim Stuck (United States) Hurley Haywood (Germany) Harald Grohs (Switzerland) René Herzog	Porsche 962	**G**	704
4	GTP	2	(United States) Alucraft/Shapiro Motorsports	(Germany) Hans-Joachim Stuck (United States) Hurley Haywood (Germany) Harald Grohs (Switzerland) René Herzog	Porsche 3.0L Flat 6 Turbo	**G**	704
5	**GTO**	**15**	(United States) **Tru-Cur/Roush Racing**	(United States) **Robby Gordon** (United Kingdom) **Calvin Fish** (United States) **Lyn St. James**	**Mercury Cougar XR-7**	**G**	**689**
6	GTP	10	(United States) Wynn's	(United States) Jim Adams (United States) John Hotchkis (United States) John Hotchkis Jr.	Porsche 962	**G**	688
6	GTP	10	(United States) Wynn's	(United States) Jim Adams (United States) John Hotchkis (United States) John Hotchkis Jr.	Porsche 3.0L Flat 6 Turbo	**G**	688
7	GTO	63	(United States) Downing/Atlanta Racing	(United States) Amos Johnson (United States) John O'Steen (United States) Jim Downing (United States) Pete Halsmer	Mazda RX-7	**G**	671
7	GTO	63	(United States) Downing/Atlanta Racing	(United States) Amos Johnson (United States) John O'Steen (United States) Jim Downing (United States) Pete Halsmer	Mazda 4R 2.1L Rotary	**G**	671
8 DNF	GTO	11	(United States) Tru-Cur/Roush Racing	(United States) Dorsey Schroeder (United States) Max Jones (Finland) Robert Lappalainen (United States) Scott Pruett	Mercury Cougar XR-7	**G**	653
8 DNF	GTO	11	(United States) Tru-Cur/Roush Racing	(United States) Dorsey Schroeder (United States) Max Jones (Finland) Robert Lappalainen (United States) Scott Pruett	Ford 6.0L V8 N/A	**G**	653
9	**Lights**	**36**	(United States) **Erie Scientific Racing**	(United States) **John Grooms** (United States) **Michael Greenfield** (United States) **Frank Jellinek**	**Argo JM16**	**G**	**642**
9	**Lights**	**36**	(United States) **Erie Scientific Racing**	(United States) **John Grooms** (United States) **Michael Greenfield** (United States) **Frank Jellinek**	Mazda 13B Racing 2R 1.3L Rotary	**G**	**642**
10	GTO	90	(United States) Escott Capri	(United States) Jim Stevens (United States) Bob Schneider (United States) Jim Jaeger (Finland) Robert Lappalainen	Mercury Capri	**G**	634
10	GTO	90	(United States) Escott Capri	(United States) Jim Stevens (United States) Bob Schneider (United States) Jim Jaeger (Finland) Robert Lappalainen	Ford 6.0L V8 N/A	**G**	634
11	GTO	74	(United States) 74 Hunting Ranch	(United States) Paul Dallenbach (United States) George Robinson (United States) Johnny Unser (United States) Wally Dallenbach Jr.	Ford Mustang	**G**	621
11	GTO	74	(United States) 74 Hunting Ranch	(United States) Paul Dallenbach (United States) George Robinson (United States) Johnny Unser (United States) Wally Dallenbach Jr.	Ford 6.0L V8 N/A	**G**	621
12	**GTU**	**71**	(United States) **Peter Uria Racing**	(United States) **Peter Uria** (United States) **Bob Dotson** (United States) **Jim Pace** (United States) **Rusty Scott**	**Mazda RX-7**	**G**	**620**
12	**GTU**	**71**	(United States) **Peter Uria Racing**	(United States) **Peter Uria** (United States) **Bob Dotson** (United States) **Jim Pace** (United States) **Rusty Scott**	Mazda 1.3L Rotary	**G**	**620**
13	Lights	55	(United States) Fuji Film	(United States) David Rocha (United States) Les Delano (United States) Andy Petery (Mexico) Oscar Manautou (United States) Craig Carter	Spice SE86CL	**F**	609
13	Lights	55	(United States) Fuji Film	(United States) David Rocha (United States) Les Delano (United States) Andy Petery (Mexico) Oscar Manautou (United States) Craig Carter	Pontiac 3.0L I4 N/A	**F**	609
14	GTU	26	(United States) Border Cantina	(United States) Chris Craft (United States) Tommy Johnson (United States) Alex Job (United States) Buz McCall	Porsche 911	**G**	605
14	GTU	26	(United States) Border Cantina	(United States) Chris Craft (United States) Tommy Johnson (United States) Alex Job (United States) Buz McCall	Porsche 3.2L Flat 6	**G**	605
15	GTU	82	(United States) Wendy's Racing Team	(United States) Dick Greer (United States) Colin Trueman (United States) Mike Mees	Mazda RX-7	**Y**	585
15	GTU	82	(United States) Wendy's Racing Team	(United States) Dick Greer (United States) Colin Trueman (United States) Mike Mees	Mazda 1.3L Rotary	**Y**	585
16	GTU	38	(United States) Mazda Motorsports	(United States) Roger Mandeville (United States) Kelly Marsh (United States) John Finger (United States) Lance Stewart (United States) John Hogdal	Mazda MX-6	**Y**	577
16	GTU	38	(United States) Mazda Motorsports	(United States) Roger Mandeville (United States) Kelly Marsh (United States) John Finger (United States) Lance Stewart (United States) John Hogdal	Mazda 13B 1.3L Rotary	**Y**	577
17	Lights	4	(United States) S&L Racing	(United States) Scott Schubot (Mexico) Tomas Lopez (United States) Linda Ludemann	Spice SE88P	**G**	544
17	Lights	4	(United States) S&L Racing	(United States) Scott Schubot (Mexico) Tomas Lopez (United States) Linda Ludemann	Buick 3.0L V6 N/A	**G**	544
18	GTO	87	(United States) Puleo & Williams Racing	(United States) Anthony Puleo (United States) Mark Kennedy (United States) Jerry Walsh (United States) Kent Painter	Chevrolet Camaro	**G**	531
18	GTO	87	(United States) Puleo & Williams Racing	(United States) Anthony Puleo (United States) Mark Kennedy (United States) Jerry Walsh (United States) Kent Painter	Chevrolet 5.7L V8 N/A	**G**	531
19	Lights	12	(United States) Carlos Bobeda Racing	(United States) Ron McKay (United States) Kaming Ko (United States) Tom Hunter Jr. (Mexico) Marlo Magana	Tiga GT287	**G**	503
19	Lights	12	(United States) Carlos Bobeda Racing	(United States) Ron McKay (United States) Kaming Ko (United States) Tom Hunter Jr. (Mexico) Marlo Magana	Chevrolet 3.0L V6 N/A	**G**	503
20	Lights	47	(United States) Bezema Buick	(United States) Steve Johnson (United States) Gary Pierce	Argo JM16	**G**	498
20	Lights	47	(United States) Bezema Buick	(United States) Steve Johnson (United States) Gary Pierce	Buick 3.0L V6 N/A	**G**	498
21 DNF	GTU	43	(United States) JVR Engineering, Inc.	(United States) Don Wallace (United States) Bob Young (United States) Brad Hoyt (United States) Joe Varde	Pontiac Fiero	**F**	469
21 DNF	GTU	43	(United States) JVR Engineering, Inc.	(United States) Don Wallace (United States) Bob Young (United States) Brad Hoyt (United States) Joe Varde	Pontiac 3.0L I4	**F**	469
22 DNF	Lights	9	(United States) Essex Racing	(France) Ferdinand de Lesseps (United States) Jay Cochran (United Kingdom) John Morrison	Spice SE88P	**G**	443
22 DNF	Lights	9	(United States) Essex Racing	(France) Ferdinand de Lesseps (United States) Jay Cochran (United Kingdom) John Morrison	Buick 3.0L V6 N/A	**G**	443
23 DNF	Lights	8	(United States) Essex Racing	(United States) Charles Morgan (Netherlands) Hendrik ten Cate (United States) Tom Hessert Jr.	Spice SE88P	**G**	440
23 DNF	Lights	8	(United States) Essex Racing	(United States) Charles Morgan (Netherlands) Hendrik ten Cate (United States) Tom Hessert Jr.	Buick 3.0L V6 N/A	**G**	440
24	Lights	97	(United States) Whitehall Motorsports	(United States) John Heinricy (United States) Tim Beverly (United States) Andy Swett (United States) Tommy Morrison	Spice SE88P	**G**	409
24	Lights	97	(United States) Whitehall Motorsports	(United States) John Heinricy (United States) Tim Beverly (United States) Andy Swett (United States) Tommy Morrison	Pontiac 3.0L I4 N/A	**G**	409
25	GTP	67	(United States) BFG/Miller High Life	(United States) Kevin Cogan (United States) John Paul Jr. (Italy) Mauro Baldi	Nissan GTP ZX-Turbo	**BF**	397
25	GTP	67	(United States) BFG/Miller High Life	(United States) Kevin Cogan (United States) John Paul Jr. (Italy) Mauro Baldi	Nissan 3.0L V6 Turbo	**BF**	397
26	GTO	04	(United States) Spirit of Brandon	(United States) Henry Brosnaham (United States) Robert McElheny (United States) Steve Burgner	Chevrolet Camaro	**G**	369
26	GTO	04	(United States) Spirit of Brandon	(United States) Henry Brosnaham (United States) Robert McElheny (United States) Steve Burgner	Chevrolet 5.5L V8 N/A	**G**	369
27 DNF	GTP	17	(Germany) Dauer Racing	(Brazil) Raul Boesel (United States) Al Unser Jr. (United States) Robby Unser	Porsche 962	**BF**	360
27 DNF	GTP	17	(Germany) Dauer Racing	(Brazil) Raul Boesel (United States) Al Unser Jr. (United States) Robby Unser	Porsche 3.0L Flat 6 Turbo	**BF**	360
28 DNF	GTP	84	(United States) Nissan Performance	(United States) Bob Earl (Republic of Ireland) Derek Daly (United States) Chip Robinson (Australia) Geoff Brabham	Nissan GTP ZX-Turbo	**G**	360
28 DNF	GTP	84	(United States) Nissan Performance	(United States) Bob Earl (Republic of Ireland) Derek Daly (United States) Chip Robinson (Australia) Geoff Brabham	Nissan 3.0L V6 Turbo	**G**	360
29 DNF	GTU	57	(United States) Kryder Racing	(United States) Reed Kryder (United States) Henry Camferdam (United States) Alistair Oag (United States) Phil Pate	Nissan 300ZX	**G**	354
29 DNF	GTU	57	(United States) Kryder Racing	(United States) Reed Kryder (United States) Henry Camferdam (United States) Alistair Oag (United States) Phil Pate	Nissan 3.0L V6 N/A	**G**	354
30 DNF	GTP	83	(United States) Nissan Performance	(United States) Bob Earl (Republic of Ireland) Derek Daly (United States) Chip Robinson (Australia) Geoff Brabham	Nissan GTP ZX-Turbo	**G**	327
30 DNF	GTP	83	(United States) Nissan Performance	(United States) Bob Earl (Republic of Ireland) Derek Daly (United States) Chip Robinson (Australia) Geoff Brabham	Nissan 3.0L V6 Turbo	**G**	327
31 DNF	Lights	58	(United States) Gary Wonzer Racing	(United States) Bill Bean (United States) Don Abreu (United States) Bill Wolfe	Lola T616	**H**	322
31 DNF	Lights	58	(United States) Gary Wonzer Racing	(United States) Bill Bean (United States) Don Abreu (United States) Bill Wolfe	Mazda 1.3L 13B Racing 2R Rotary	**H**	322
32 DNF	Lights	80	(Canada) Bieri Racing	(Italy) Martino Finotto (Italy) Paolo Guatamacchi (Switzerland) Loris Kessel	Spice SE89P	**G**	306
32 DNF	Lights	80	(Canada) Bieri Racing	(Italy) Martino Finotto (Italy) Paolo Guatamacchi (Switzerland) Loris Kessel	Ferrari 3.0L V8 N/A	**G**	306
33 DNF	GTU	00	(United States) Full Time Racing	(United States) Kal Showket (United States) Don Knowles (United States) Neil Hanneman (United States) Mike Davies	Dodge Daytona	**Y**	280
33 DNF	GTU	00	(United States) Full Time Racing	(United States) Kal Showket (United States) Don Knowles (United States) Neil Hanneman (United States) Mike Davies	Dodge 2.4L I4 N/A	**Y**	280
34 DNF	Lights	01	(United States) Racecraft International	(United States) Mike Allison (United Kingdom) Andrew Hepworth (United States) Michael Dow (United States) George Sutcliffe (United Kingdom) Chris Hodgetts	Spice SE87L	**G**	263
34 DNF	Lights	01	(United States) Racecraft International	(United States) Mike Allison (United Kingdom) Andrew Hepworth (United States) Michael Dow (United States) George Sutcliffe (United Kingdom) Chris Hodgetts	Pontiac 3.0L I4 N/A	**G**	263
35 DNF	GTP	99	(United States) All American Racers	(United States) Rocky Moran (United States) Drake Olson (Argentina) Juan Manuel Fangio II	Eagle HF89	**G**	253
35 DNF	GTP	99	(United States) All American Racers	(United States) Rocky Moran (United States) Drake Olson (Argentina) Juan Manuel Fangio II	Toyota 2.1L I4 Turbo	**G**	253
36	GTO	21	(United States) Budweiser Racing	(United States) Craig Rubright (United States) Kermit Upton (United States) Daniel Urrutia	Chevrolet Camaro	**G**	247
36	GTO	21	(United States) Budweiser Racing	(United States) Craig Rubright (United States) Kermit Upton (United States) Daniel Urrutia	Chevrolet 5.5L V8 N/A	**G**	247
37 DNF	Lights	79	(United States) Winters/Whitehall	(United States) Ken Knott (United States) Tom Winters (France) Claude Ballot-Léna (France) Thierry Lecerf	Spice SE87L	**G**	243
37 DNF	Lights	79	(United States) Winters/Whitehall	(United States) Ken Knott (United States) Tom Winters (France) Claude Ballot-Léna (France) Thierry Lecerf	Pontiac Cosworth 3.0L I4 N/A	**G**	243
38 DNF	Lights	42	(United States) Motorsports Marketing	(United States) Howard Cherry (United States) John Higgins (Canada) Charles Monk (United States) Tim McAdam	Fabcar CL	**G**	242
38 DNF	Lights	42	(United States) Motorsports Marketing	(United States) Howard Cherry (United States) John Higgins (Canada) Charles Monk (United States) Tim McAdam	Porsche 3.0L Flat 6 N/A	**G**	242
39	GTU	81	(United States) Racers' Cafe	(United States) Bob Speakman (United States) David Duda (United States) Mike Speakman (United States) Jim Novotne	Datsun 240Z	**F**	231
39	GTU	81	(United States) Racers' Cafe	(United States) Bob Speakman (United States) David Duda (United States) Mike Speakman (United States) Jim Novotne	Nissan 3.0L I6 N/A	**F**	231
40	GTO	29	(United States) Overbagh Motor Racing	(United States) Guy Church (United States) Mark Montgomery (United States) Del Russo Taylor (United States) Don Arpin (United States) Hoyt Overbagh	Chevrolet Camaro	**G**	229
40	GTO	29	(United States) Overbagh Motor Racing	(United States) Guy Church (United States) Mark Montgomery (United States) Del Russo Taylor (United States) Don Arpin (United States) Hoyt Overbagh	Chevrolet 6.0L V8 N/A	**G**	229
41 DNF	GTP	30	(Germany) Momo	(Italy) Giampiero Moretti (United Kingdom) Derek Ball (Sweden) Stanley Dickens	Porsche 962	**G**	186
41 DNF	GTP	30	(Germany) Momo	(Italy) Giampiero Moretti (United Kingdom) Derek Ball (Sweden) Stanley Dickens	Porsche 3.0L Flat 6 Twin Turbo	**G**	186
42 DNF	Lights	92	(United States) Promo Racing	(United States) Max Schmidt (United States) Jim Briody (United States) Rusty Schmidt (United States) Jorge Mendoza	Argo JM19	**G**	176
42 DNF	Lights	92	(United States) Promo Racing	(United States) Max Schmidt (United States) Jim Briody (United States) Rusty Schmidt (United States) Jorge Mendoza	Mazda 13B Racing 2R 1.3L Rotary	**G**	176
43 DNF	GTO	53	(United States) Hi-Tech Coating	(United States) Richard McDill (United States) Jim Burt (United States) Bill McDill	Chevrolet Camaro	**G**	145
43 DNF	GTO	53	(United States) Hi-Tech Coating	(United States) Richard McDill (United States) Jim Burt (United States) Bill McDill	Chevrolet 5.8L V8 N/A	**G**	145
44 DNF	GTU	95	(United States) Fastcolor Auto Art	(United States) Bob Leitzinger (United States) David Loring (United States) Butch Leitzinger	Nissan 240SX	**T**	167
44 DNF	GTU	95	(United States) Fastcolor Auto Art	(United States) Bob Leitzinger (United States) David Loring (United States) Butch Leitzinger	Nissan 3.0L V6 N/A	**T**	167
45 DNF	GTP	0	(Germany) Joest Racing	(Germany) Frank Jelinski (France) Henri Pescarolo (France) Jean-Louis Ricci	Porsche 962	**G**	145
45 DNF	GTP	0	(Germany) Joest Racing	(Germany) Frank Jelinski (France) Henri Pescarolo (France) Jean-Louis Ricci	Porsche 3.0L Flat 6 Twin Turbo	**G**	145
46 DNF	GTU	07	(United States) Full Time Racing	(United States) Stu Hayner (United States) Robbie Buhl	Dodge Daytona	**Y**	137
46 DNF	GTU	07	(United States) Full Time Racing	(United States) Stu Hayner (United States) Robbie Buhl	Dodge 2.4L I4 N/A	**Y**	137
47 DNF	GTP	33	(United States) Panasonic/Carlos & Charlies	(Mexico) Bernard Jourdain (United States) Jeff Kline (Japan) Hiro Matsushita	Spice SE90P	**G**	90
47 DNF	GTP	33	(United States) Panasonic/Carlos & Charlies	(Mexico) Bernard Jourdain (United States) Jeff Kline (Japan) Hiro Matsushita	Chevrolet 6.0L V8 N/A	**G**	90
48 DNF	GTU	37	(United States) Mazda Motorsports	(United States) Al Bacon (United States) John Hogdal	Mazda RX-7	**Y**	85
48 DNF	GTU	37	(United States) Mazda Motorsports	(United States) Al Bacon (United States) John Hogdal	Mazda 1.3L Rotary	**Y**	85
49 DNF	Lights	70	(United States) Paul Reisman Hrg., Inc.	(United States) Paul Reisman (United States) Bob Herbert (United States) R. J. Valentine	Argo JM16	**G**	84
49 DNF	Lights	70	(United States) Paul Reisman Hrg., Inc.	(United States) Paul Reisman (United States) Bob Herbert (United States) R. J. Valentine	Mazda 13B Racing 2R 1.3L Rotary	**G**	84
50 DNF	GTO	54	(United States) Race Power	(United States) Rob Segall (United States) Richard Davis (United States) Gerre Payvis (United States) Bill Cerveney (United States) Jeff Davis	Chevrolet Camaro	**G**	74
50 DNF	GTO	54	(United States) Race Power	(United States) Rob Segall (United States) Richard Davis (United States) Gerre Payvis (United States) Bill Cerveney (United States) Jeff Davis	Chevrolet 5.7L V8 N/A	**G**	74
51 DNF	GTO	41	(United States) Young Racing	(United States) Joe Cogbill (United States) Mark Gibson (United States) Dale Kreider	Chevrolet Beretta	**F**	67
51 DNF	GTO	41	(United States) Young Racing	(United States) Joe Cogbill (United States) Mark Gibson (United States) Dale Kreider	Chevrolet 5.7L V8 N/A	**F**	67
52 DNF	GTO	1	(United States) Downing/Atlanta Racing	(United States) Elliott Forbes-Robinson (United States) John Morton (United States) Pete Halsmer	Mazda RX-7	**G**	61
52 DNF	GTO	1	(United States) Downing/Atlanta Racing	(United States) Elliott Forbes-Robinson (United States) John Morton (United States) Pete Halsmer	Mazda 4R 2.1L Rotary	**G**	61
53 DNF	Lights	40	(Canada) Bieri Racing	(Canada) Uli Bieri (Canada) David Tennyson (Canada) John Graham	Tiga GT286	**G**	58
53 DNF	Lights	40	(Canada) Bieri Racing	(Canada) Uli Bieri (Canada) David Tennyson (Canada) John Graham	Ferrari 3.0L V8 N/A	**G**	58
54 DNF	GTP	23	(Canada) DSR Motorsports	(Canada) Bill Adam (Canada) Richard Laporte (Canada) Scott Goodyear (Canada) David Seabroke	Porsche 962	**G**	43
54 DNF	GTP	23	(Canada) DSR Motorsports	(Canada) Bill Adam (Canada) Richard Laporte (Canada) Scott Goodyear (Canada) David Seabroke	Porsche 3.0L Flat 6 Turbo	**G**	43
55 DNF	GTP	16	(United States) Dyson Racing	(United States) Rob Dyson (United Kingdom) James Weaver (United States) Scott Pruett (Australia) Vern Schuppan	Porsche 962	**G**	6
55 DNF	GTP	16	(United States) Dyson Racing	(United States) Rob Dyson (United Kingdom) James Weaver (United States) Scott Pruett (Australia) Vern Schuppan	Porsche 3.0L Flat 6 Twin Turbo	**G**	6
DNS	GTP	3	(Switzerland) Brun Motorsports	(Argentina) Oscar Larrauri (Switzerland) Walter Brun (Italy) Massimo Sigala	Porsche 962	**Y**	-
DNS	GTP	3	(Switzerland) Brun Motorsports	(Argentina) Oscar Larrauri (Switzerland) Walter Brun (Italy) Massimo Sigala	Porsche 3.0L Flat 6 Turbo	**Y**	-
DNS	GTP	6	(United States) Tom Milner Racing	(Switzerland) René Herzog (Germany) Harald Grohs	Ford Mustang Probe	**G**	-
DNS	GTP	6	(United States) Tom Milner Racing	(Switzerland) René Herzog (Germany) Harald Grohs	Ford Zakspeed 2.1L I4 Turbo	**G**	-
DNS	GTP	31	(Germany) Momo	(Greece) Costas Los (Germany) Günter Gebhardt (Germany) Hellmut Mundas	Gebhardt 88 C2	**G**	-
DNS	GTP	31	(Germany) Momo	(Greece) Costas Los (Germany) Günter Gebhardt (Germany) Hellmut Mundas	Audi 2.1L I4 Turbo	**G**	-
DNS	GTO	28	(United States) Raul Garcia	(United States) Raul Garcia (United States) George Garcia	Pontiac Firebird	**G**	-
DNS	GTO	28	(United States) Raul Garcia	(United States) Raul Garcia (United States) George Garcia	Pontiac 5.8L V8 N/A	**G**	-
DNS	GTU	18	(United States) Rick Holland	(United States) Rick Holland (United States) Mike Green (United States) Dennis Chambers	Mazda RX-7	**B**	-
DNS	GTU	18	(United States) Rick Holland	(United States) Rick Holland (United States) Mike Green (United States) Dennis Chambers	Mazda 1.3L Rotary	**B**	-
DNS	GTU	56	(United States) SP Racing	(United States) Bill Auberlen (United States) Nort Northam (United States) Cary Eisenlohr (United States) Gary Auberlen	Porsche 911 Carrera RSR	?	-
DNS	GTU	56	(United States) SP Racing	(United States) Bill Auberlen (United States) Nort Northam (United States) Cary Eisenlohr (United States) Gary Auberlen	Porsche 3.0L Flat 6 N/A	?	-
