= Jaguar XJR sportscars =

Series of British race cars

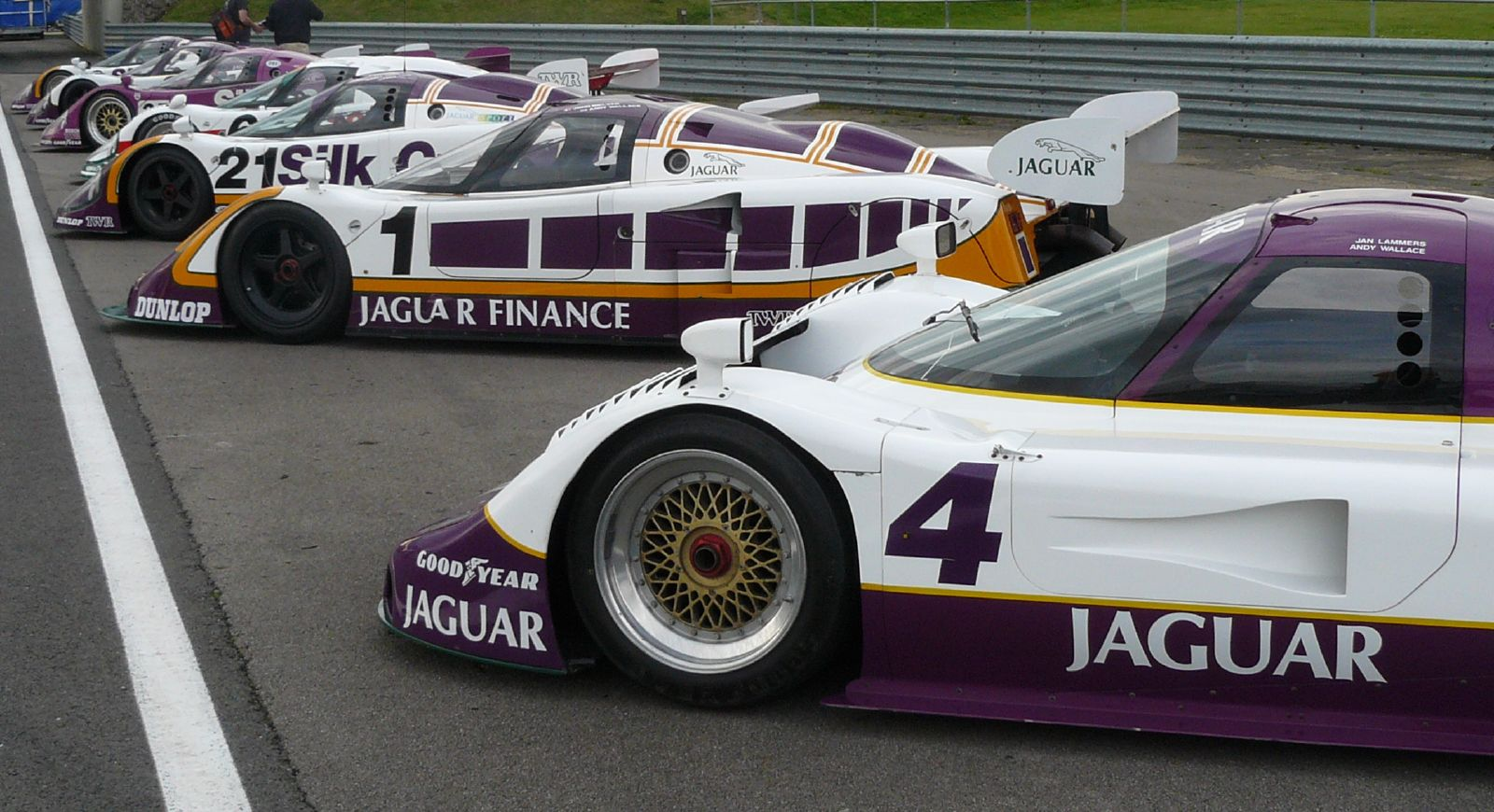
Several XJRs seen in their traditional European Silk Cut paint scheme.

The Jaguar XJR sportscars were a series of race cars used by Jaguar-backed teams in both the World Sportscar Championship (WSC) Group C and the IMSA Camel GTP series between 1984 and 1993.

== History ==
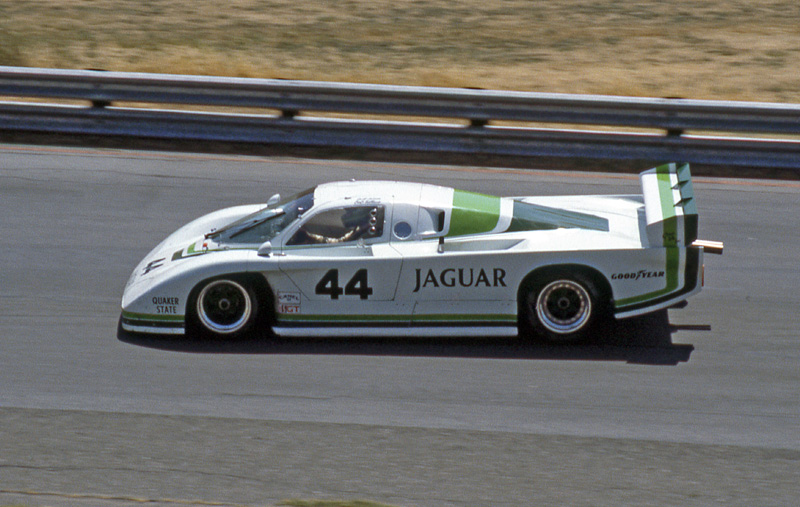
A Jaguar XJR-5 at Sears Point in 1983

Starting in 1983, the project was started by an American team Group 44 Racing, headed up by owner-driver Bob Tullius, who had the backing of Jaguar to build the Fabcar designed racer known as XJR-5 in their Herndon, Virginia, US, shop and to campaign it in the IMSA Camel GTP championship. After becoming established in IMSA, Jaguar turned to Tom Walkinshaw Racing (TWR) to develop another car known as XJR-6 for the World Sportscar Championship, using the same Jaguar V12 engine, and debuting halfway into the 1985 season.

Jaguar would continue to use two different types of chassis for IMSA and the WSC until 1988 when Jaguar chose to have TWR take over their team for both championships, and building an identical car for both series, known as the XJR-9.

After having used the V12 in a variety of sizes, TWR decided to try a new turbocharged 3.5L V6 for the XJR-10 (for IMSA) and the XJR-11 (for the WSC) in the 1989 season. However, the FIA announced rule changes to come into effect for the WSC that would require all teams to change to 3.5L naturally aspirated engines. TWR decided that continuing to develop their V6 in the WSC was useless, so the new XJR-12 for the WSC in 1990 was better suited to carry the old but reliable V12. The XJR-12 was short-lived, as in 1991, Jaguar decided to debut their new 3.5L naturally aspirated V8 engine by Cosworth for the XJR-14.

After having won multiple championships in the WSC, and instability due to multiple rule changes, Jaguar decided to drop out following the 1991 season and concentrate on IMSA. However, after attempting the first few races of the 1993 season, Jaguar decided to end the project altogether, marking the end of the XJR sportscars. Jaguar and TWR attempted to continue racing on with a cheaper and smaller scale project, a racing version of the XJ220 for the GT classes, but it was short-lived.

One unique XJR model was the 1990 XJR-15, which was a limited-edition road-legal supercar built by TWR from the design of the XJR-9 and featuring Jaguar's V12. Several XJR-15s were also built into racing cars for a special one-make series meant as a support race for Formula One.

== Jaguar XJRs ==
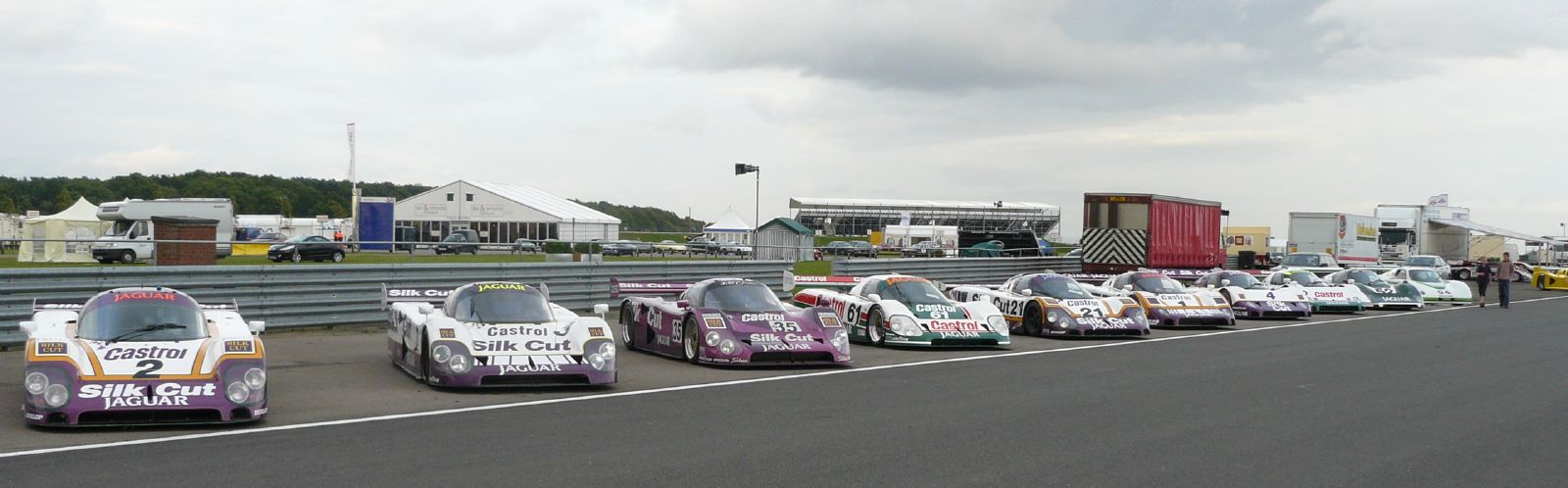
A grouping of various XJRs, from left to right: An XJR-9, three XJR-12s, another XJR-9, two XJR-11s, an XJR-10, an XJR-6, and an XJR-5

The following cars were built for Jaguar's sportscar racing.

=== IMSA GTP ===
- XJR-5
- XJR-7
- XJR-9
- XJR-10
- XJR-12
- XJR-14
- XJR-16
- XJR-17

=== WSC Group C ===
- XJR-6
- XJR-8
- XJR-9
- XJR-11
- XJR-12
- XJR-14

=== Other ===
- XJR-15

== Major achievements ==
- World Sportscar Championship:
  - Teams' champion - 1987 (TWR XJR-8), 1988 (TWR XJR-9), 1991 (TWR XJR-14)
  - Drivers' Champion - 1987 (Raul Boesel), 1988 (Martin Brundle), 1991 (Teo Fabi)
- 24 Hours of Le Mans:
  - Overall victories - 1988 (Jan Lammers, Johnny Dumfries, Andy Wallace - TWR XJR-9), 1990 (John Nielsen, Price Cobb, Martin Brundle - TWR XJR-12LM)
  - Class victories - 1985 - IMSA GTP (Bob Tullius, Claude Ballot-Léna, Chip Robinson - Group 44 XJR-5)
- 24 Hours of Daytona - Overall victories - 1988 (Martin Brundle, Raul Boesel, John Nielsen - TWR XJR-9), 1990 (Davy Jones, Jan Lammers, Andy Wallace - TWR XJR-12)

== Bibliography ==
- Bamsey, Ian (1989). Jaguar XJR: Group C & GTP Cars: A Technical Appraisal of the V12 Cars. Foulis motoring book series. Sparkford, Somerset, England; Newbury Park, CA, USA: Haynes Publishing. ISBN 0854297529.
- Thurston, Leslie F. (2003). TWR Jaguar Prototype Racers. Jaguar Daimler Heritage Trust. ISBN 978-0954103910.

Awards
Preceded by Williams FW11	Autosport; Racing Car Of The Year (Jaguar XJR-8); 1987	Succeeded by McLaren MP4/4
