= Jaguar XJR-11 =

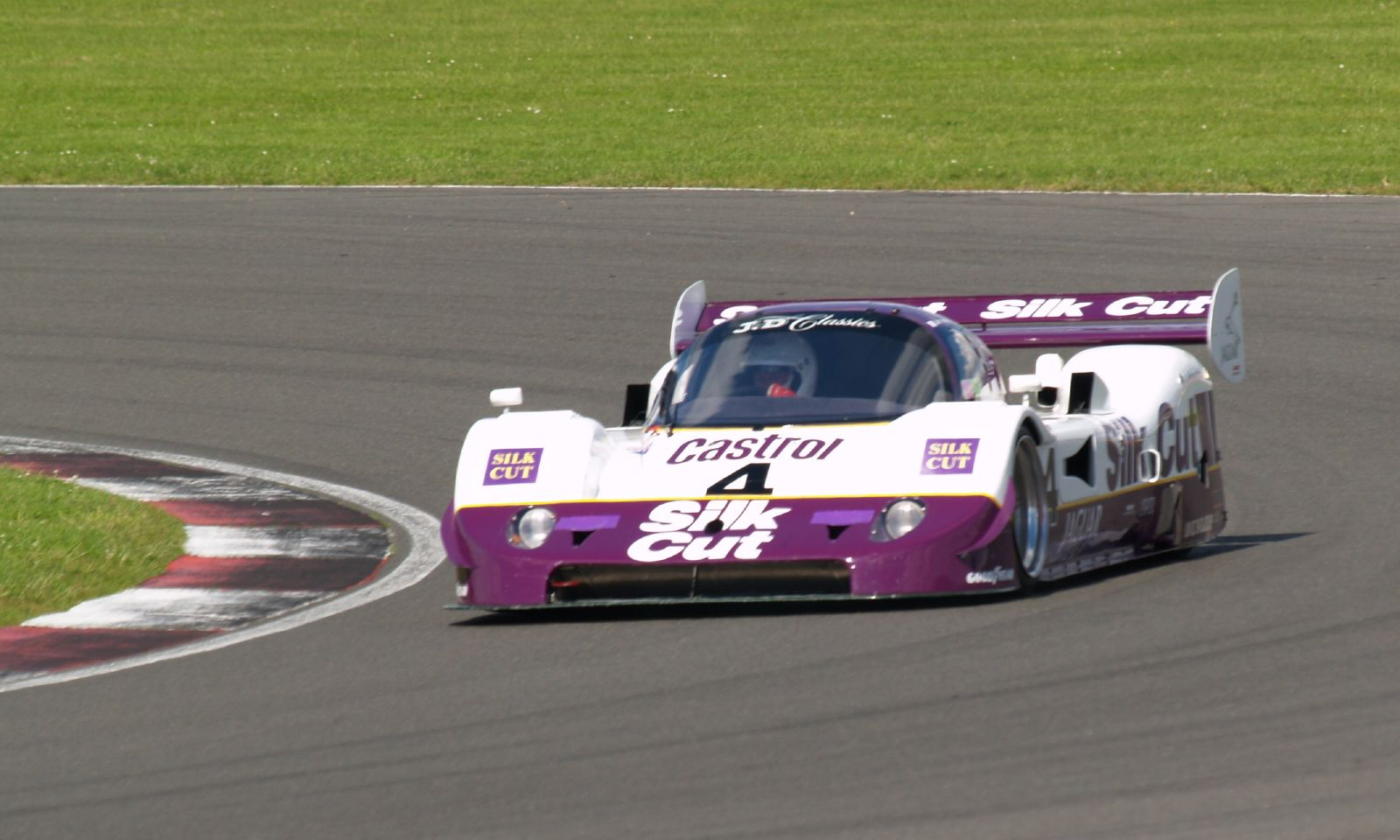

Overview
- Manufacturer: Jaguar Cars
- Production: 1989–1990
- Designer: Tony Southgate for TWR

Body and chassis
- Class: Racing car
- Body style: 2-door Coupé
- Layout: RMR layout
- Related: Jaguar XJR-10

Powertrain
- Engine: 3.5 L 90 degree Jaguar JRV-6 Twin-Turbocharged V6
- Transmission: TWR 5-speed manual

Dimensions
- Kerb weight: 900 kg (1,984 lb)

Chronology
- Predecessor: Jaguar XJR-9
- Successor: Jaguar XJR-12; Jaguar XJR-14; Jaguar XJR-16

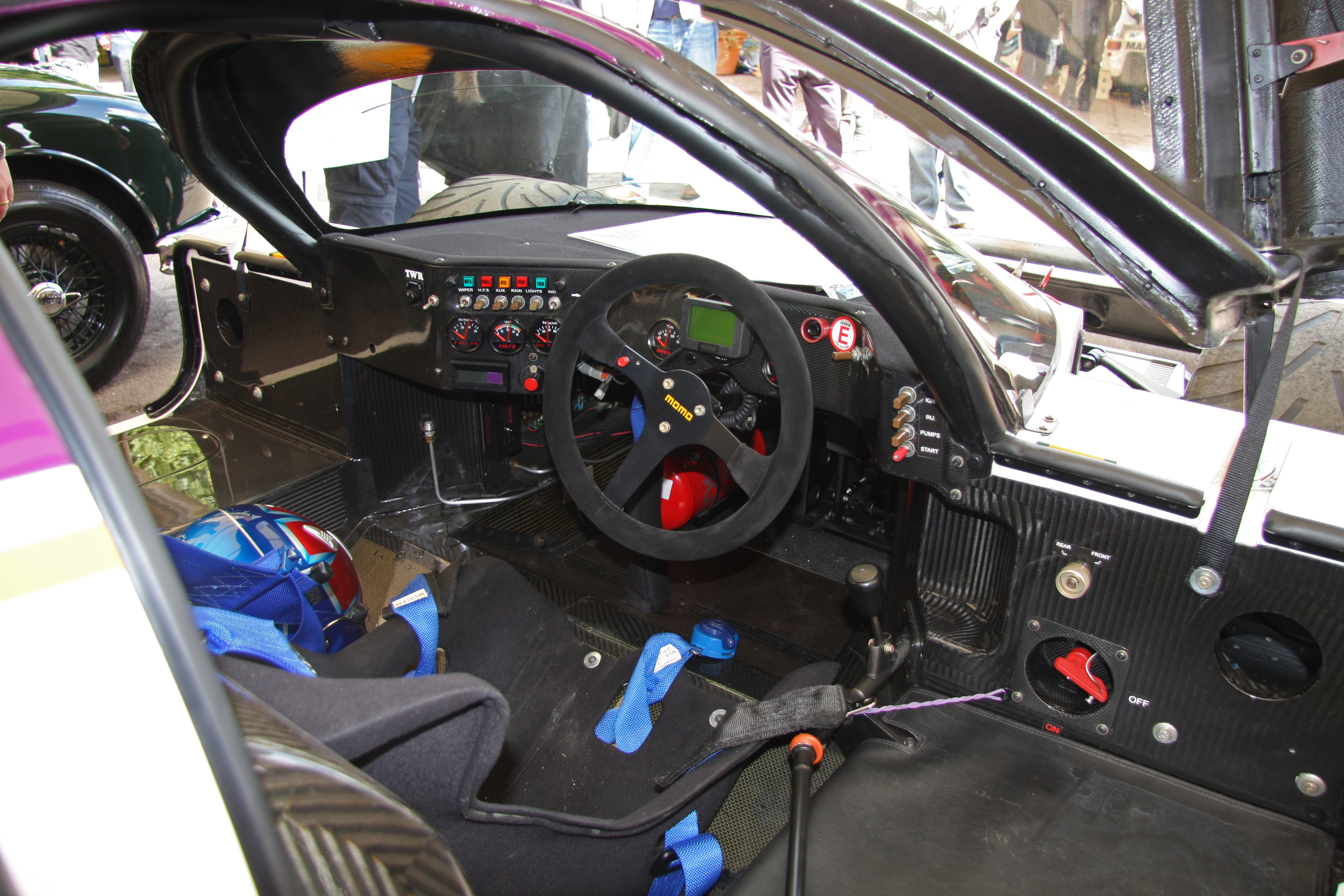
Cockpit

The Jaguar XJR-11 was a sports-prototype racing car introduced for the 1989 World Sports Prototype Championship, while its sister car the XJR-10 was introduced to compete in IMSA series races.

== Development ==
For the 1989 season, Tom Walkinshaw realised that the TWR produced V12 Jaguar sports prototypes were lacking competitiveness, especially in short sprint events. The small, light weight forced induction engines used by competitors such as Mercedes-Benz outperformed the big, naturally aspirated engines that Jaguar Sport had been using since the start of the programme.

Jaguar started development of a new engine in order to stay competitive. The Rover V64V 3.5 L V6 engine originally designed for the MG Metro 6R4 rally car proved to be an ideal engine for the new car, with its weight of just 143 kg (315 lb) and consistent performance. Jaguar developed two variants of the engine: the 3.0 L variant was intended for competition in the IMSA series and the 3.5 L variant was intended for competition in World sports car championship. Both variants were fitted with two Garett turbochargers and produced varied power outputs of 650 hp (659 PS; 485 kW) and 750 hp (760 PS; 559 kW) respectively depending on the level of boost.

Tony Southgate designed a new chassis for the car which was compact and the evolution of the carbon fibre monocoque of the previous XJR-8/XJR-9. The chassis incorporated double wishbone suspension with push-rod actuated dampers front and rear, with the rear suspension mounted overboard. This helped free up more space for the ground-effect tunnels in order to improve performance. Two different bodies were designed for the car, as it was to compete in two different championships.

== Racing History ==
The XJR-11 was entered into competition in July 1989 at Brands Hatch and as expected faced strong competition from the V8-powered Sauber-Mercedes 'Silver Arrow' cars, (the C8 and C9). The team of Jan Lammers and Patrick Tambay managed to finish sixth in the car's debut race. The car faced reliabity issues throughout the year and was only able to secure a single victory in the 1990 season at Silverstone. The XJR-11 wasn't used at the 24 hours of Le Mans event and a new car, the XJR-12, was developed to compete in that event. The car's career was short-lived and it was no longer eligible to compete in events due to the new rules implemented for the 1991 season. With only one victory in its short career, it was one of the most unsuccessful sports prototypes produced by TWR. The generally accepted major reason for its failure was unreliability but its 3.5 L engine would later find use in the Jaguar XJ220.

== Specifications ==
- Engine
  - Configuration: Jaguar 90 degree JRV6 V6 engine
  - Position: Mid, Longitudinally mounted
  - Construction: Aluminium alloy block and heads
  - Displacement: 3.5 L (214 cu in) (3,498 cc)
  - Bore/Stroke: 94 mm (3.7 in)/84 mm (3.3 in)
  - Valvetrain: DOHC, 4-valves per cylinder
  - Injection: Bosch fuel injection
  - Aspiration: Forced induction (twin-turbo with two Garrett turbochargers)
  - Power: 750 hp (760 PS; 559 kW) at 7,500 rpm
- Drivetrain
  - Body: Carbon composite body
  - Chassis: Carbon fibre and Kevlar monocoque
  - Suspension: Double wishbones, push-rod actuated coil springs over dampers with anti-roll bar (front)
    double wishbones, coil springs over dampers with anti-roll bar (rear)
  - Brakes: AP Racing cross ventilated discs with 6-piston calipers front and rear
  - Layout: Rear-wheel drive
- Performance
  - Power to weight ratio: 0.83 hp/kg
  - Top speed: 229 mph (369 km/h) (quoted)

== See also ==
- Jaguar XJR Sportscars
