= Jaguar XJR-9 =

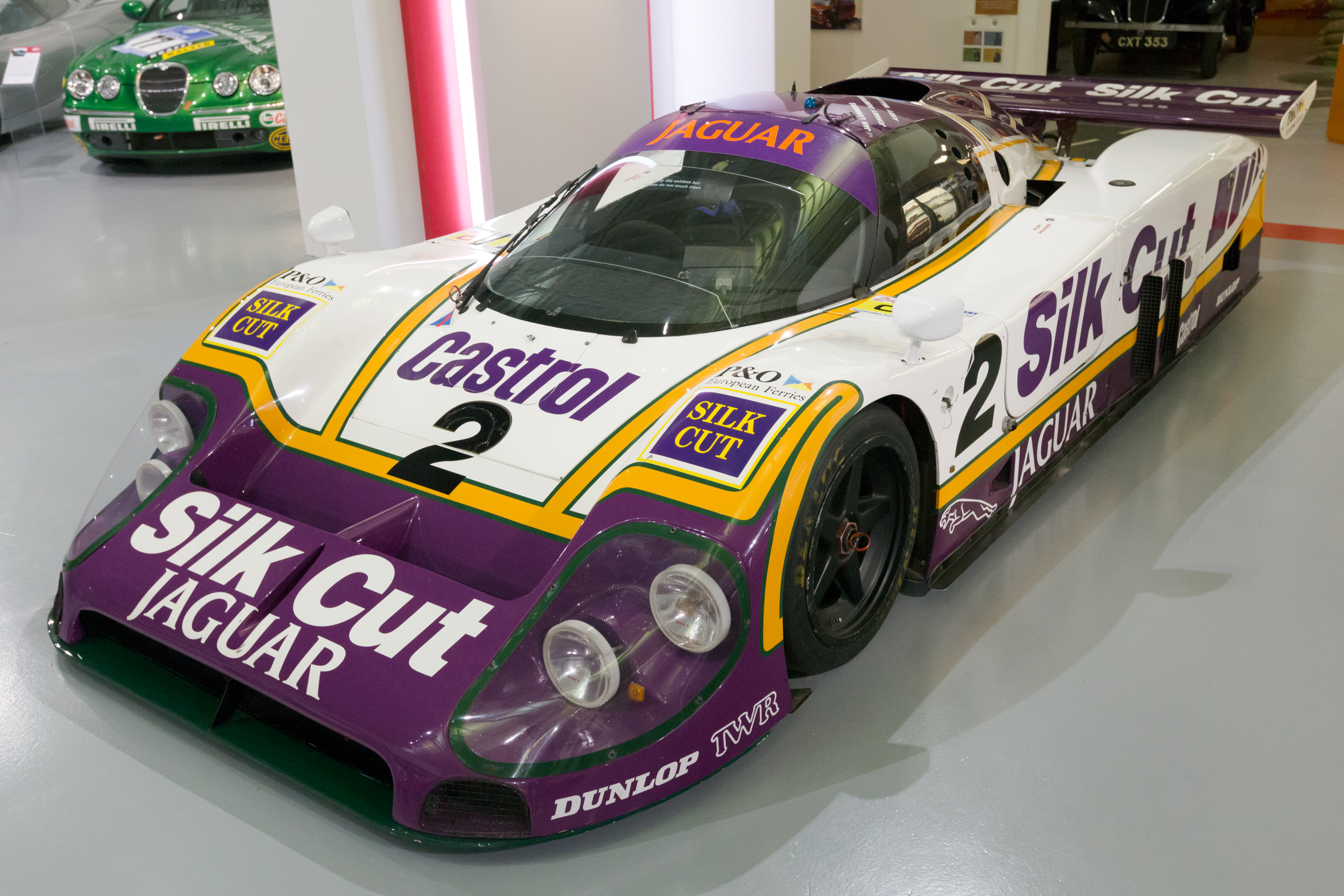
- The 1988 24 Hours of Le Mans-winning No. 2 XJR-9 on display at the British Motor Museum

Overview
- Manufacturer: Jaguar Cars; Tom Walkinshaw Racing
- Production: 1988–1989
- Assembly: United Kingdom: Kidlington, Oxfordshire
- Designer: Tony Southgate for TWR

Body and chassis
- Class: Racing car
- Body style: 2-door Coupé
- Layout: Rear mid-engine, rear-wheel-drive
- Related: Jaguar XJR-15; Jaguar XJR-12

Powertrain
- Engine: 6.0 L 60 degree Jaguar V12 (IMSA); 7.0 L 60 degree Jaguar V12 (WSPC)
- Transmission: 5-speed manual

Dimensions
- Wheelbase: 2,780 mm (109.4 in)
- Length: 4,780 mm (188.2 in)
- Width: 2,000 mm (78.7 in)
- Height: 1,100 mm (43.3 in)
- Kerb weight: 880 kg (1,940 lb)

Chronology
- Predecessor: Jaguar XJR-8
- Successor: Jaguar XJR-10; Jaguar XJR-11

The Jaguar XJR-9 is a sports-prototype race car built by Jaguar for both FIA Group C and IMSA Camel GTP racing. In 1988, Jaguar's XJR-9 won the 24 Hours of Le Mans, after debuting with an overall victory at the 24 Hours of Daytona.

== Development ==
An evolution of the design for the XJR-8, the XJR-9 was designed by Tony Southgate, built by Tom Walkinshaw Racing (TWR) and featured a Jaguar 7.0-litre V12 engine based on the production 5.3-litre engine as used in the Jaguar XJS road car. A variant of the XJR-9, the XJR-9LM, would be developed specifically for the 24 Hours of Le Mans where the requirement for high straight line speeds on the Mulsanne Straight necessitated a low-drag aerodynamic package.

== History ==
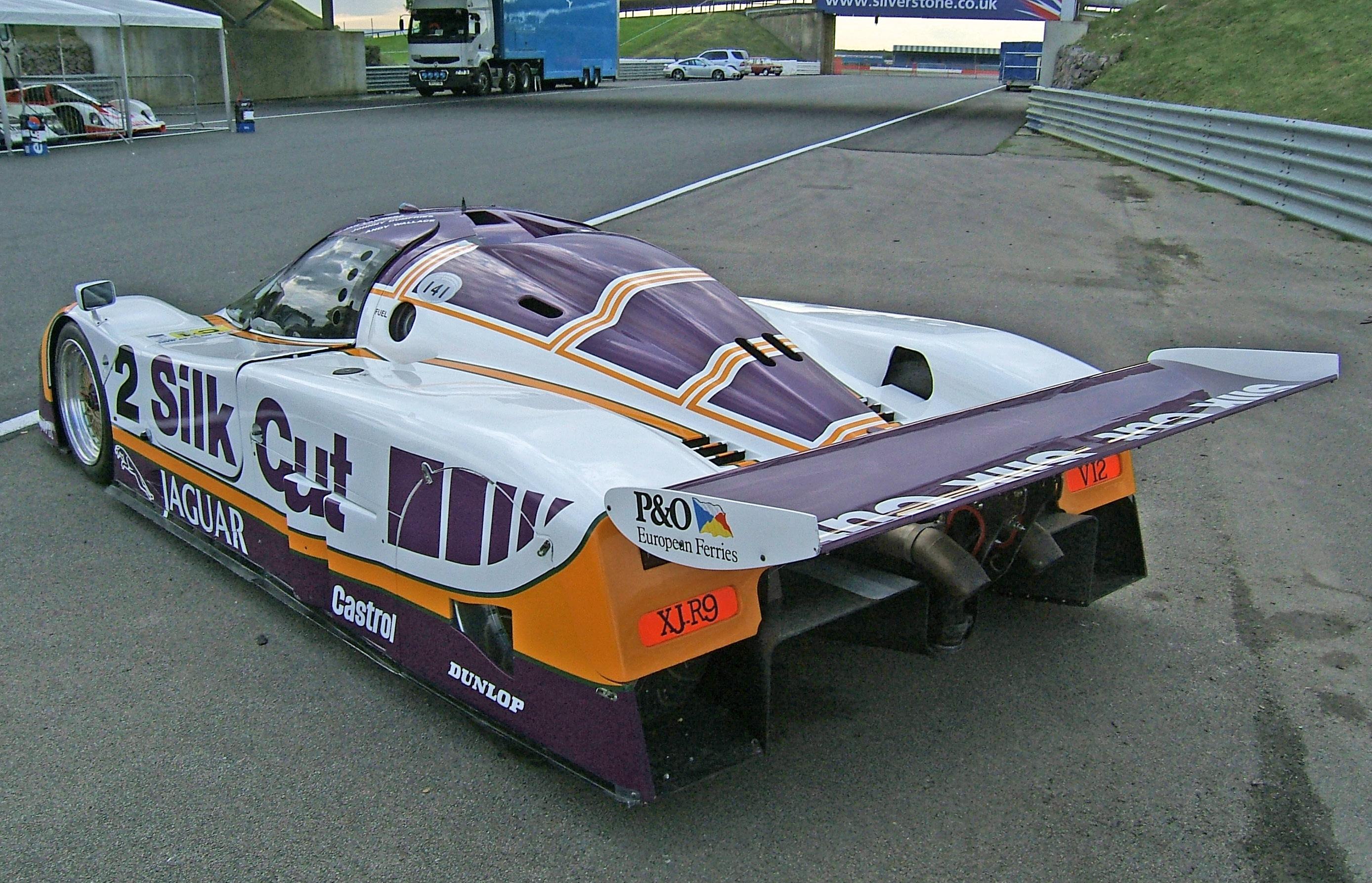
Rear three-quarter view of the 1988 Le Mans-winning XJR-9.

Jaguar XJR8-9 (1987)
Jaguar XJR8-9 driven by Justin Law at Goodwood Festival of Speed 2009

In the United States, the Castrol sponsored XJR-9s debuted at the 24 Hours of Daytona, with the car taking the overall win. However, throughout the rest of the IMSA Camel GTP season the XJR-9 was unable to gain another win until the final race of the season, meaning the team had to settle for third in the constructor's championship. In the 1988 World Sports Prototype Championship, the XJR-9, running Silk Cut sponsorship, met with more success. The XJR-9 was able to take six victories, including the 24 Hours of Le Mans, over the eleven race series. Silk Cut Jaguar won the Teams Championship and Jaguar driver Martin Brundle won the Drivers title. Jaguar's success at Le Mans marked the first time since 1980 that Porsche had not won Le Mans, and the first Le Mans victory for Jaguar since 1957.

For 1989, the XJR-9 was again entered in both IMSA Camel GTP and the World Sports Prototype Championship. However, the XJR-9 was by now dated, and in IMSA was being repeatedly beaten by Nissan, leaving the XJR-9 with only a single win on the season. This led to Jaguar introducing the XJR-10 midway through the season, which met with slightly better success having two wins on the season and usually placing higher than the XJR-9 it ran with. At the end of the season, Jaguar finished 2nd in the championship.

A similar story occurred in the 1989 World Sports Prototype Championship, with Jaguar not winning a single race during the series. Midway through the championship, the XJR-11 was developed to replace the XJR-9, although both finished out the season. This disappointment led to Jaguar finishing fourth in the Teams Championship.

Within months of Jaguar's 1988 Le Mans victory, TWR would use the XJR-9 chassis for the development of the R9R prototype which by 1990 had evolved into the XJR-15 sports car and spec-racer.

In 2010, the car won the Le Mans Legend race.

== Specifications ==
Engine

- Type: 60 degree SOHC 24 valve V12
- Position: Mid, Longitudinally mounted
- Displacement: 6,995 cc (427 cu in) (World Sports Prototype Championship)
  - 5,996 cc (366 cu in) (IMSA GTP)
- Bore: 94 mm (3.7 in)
- Stroke: 84 mm (3.3 in)
- Compression: 12:1
- Injection: Zytek fuel injection
- Aspiration: Naturally aspirated
- Power: 750 hp (760 PS; 559 kW) at 7,200 rpm
- Torque: 828 N⋅m (611 lb⋅ft) at 5,500 rpm

Drivetrain

- Body: Carbon Composite body
- Chassis: Carbon fibre and Kevlar monocoque
- Front Suspension: Double wishbones, push-rod activated coil springs over dampers
- Rear Suspension: Magnesium uprights, titanium coil springs over dampers
- Steering: Rack and pinion power steering
- Brakes: TWR ventilated discs
- Transmission: March/TWR 5-speed manual transmission
- Layout: Rear-wheel drive

Performance figures

- Power to weight ratio: 0.85bhp/kg
- Top speed: 245 mph (394 km/h)

== 24 Hours of Le Mans results ==
Year	Team	Drivers	Car #	Class	Laps	Pos.	Class Pos.
1988	(United Kingdom) Silk Cut Jaguar	(United Kingdom) Martin Brundle (Denmark) John Nielsen	1	C1	306	DNF	DNF
1988	(United Kingdom) Silk Cut Jaguar	(Netherlands) Jan Lammers (United Kingdom) Johnny Dumfries (United Kingdom) Andy Wallace	2	C1	394	1st	1st
1988	(United Kingdom) Silk Cut Jaguar	(United Kingdom) John Watson (France) Henri Pescarolo (Brazil) Raul Boesel	3	C1	129	DNF	DNF
1988	(United Kingdom) Silk Cut Jaguar	(United States) Danny Sullivan (United States) Davy Jones (United States) Price Cobb	21	C1	331	16th	14th
1988	(United Kingdom) Silk Cut Jaguar	(Republic of Ireland) Derek Daly (Australia) Larry Perkins (United States) Kevin Cogan	22	C1	383	4th	4th
1989	(United Kingdom) Silk Cut Jaguar	(Netherlands) Jan Lammers (France) Patrick Tambay (United Kingdom) Andrew Gilbert-Scott	1	C1	381	4th	4th
1989	(United Kingdom) Silk Cut Jaguar	(Denmark) John Nielsen (United Kingdom) Andy Wallace (United States) Price Cobb	2	C1	215	DNF	DNF
1989	(United Kingdom) Silk Cut Jaguar	(United States) Davy Jones (Republic of Ireland) Derek Daly (United States) Jeff Klein	3	C1	85	DNF	DNF
1989	(United Kingdom) Silk Cut Jaguar	(France) Alain Ferté (France) Michel Ferté (Chile) Eliseo Salazar	4	C1	369	8th	7th

== Gallery ==
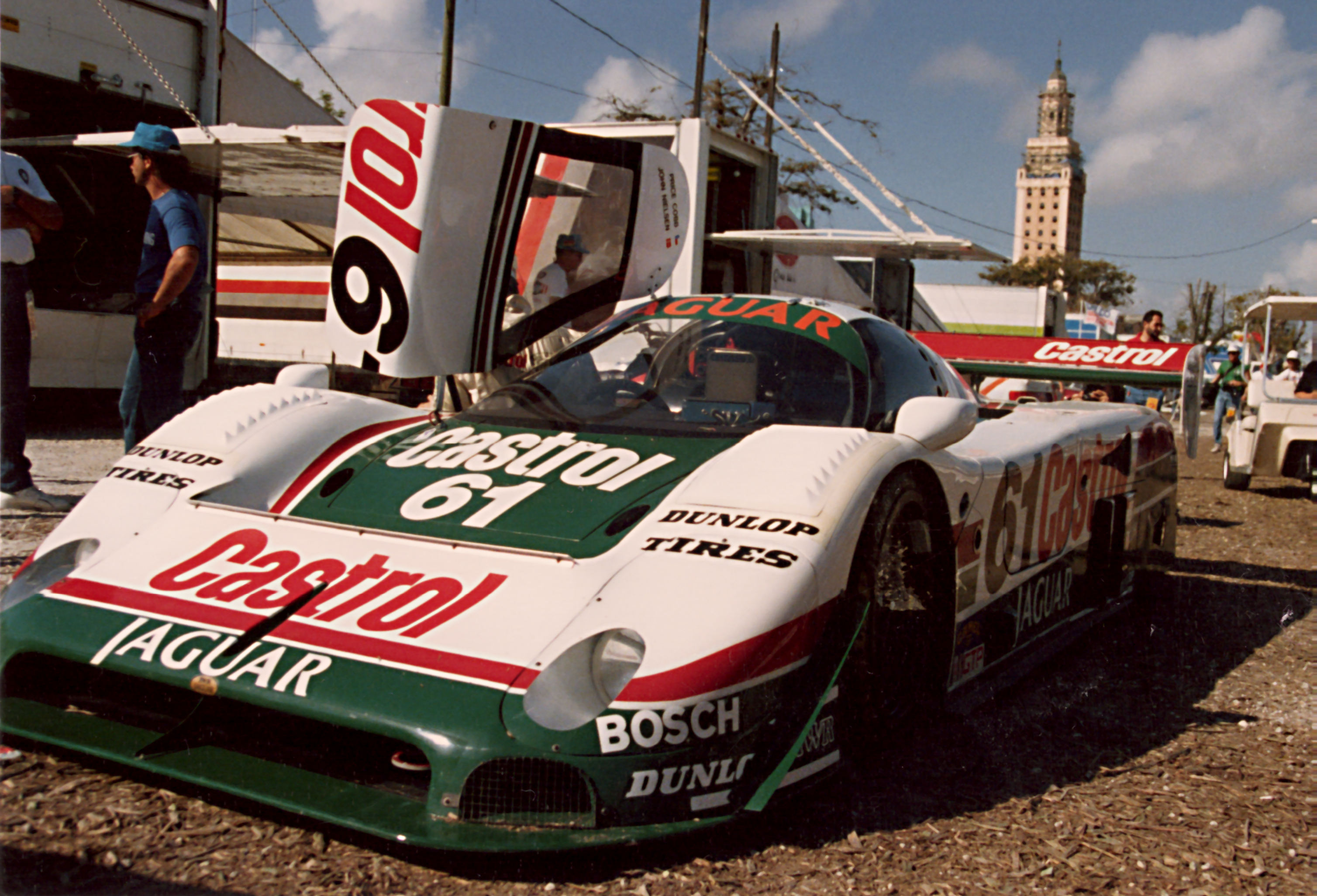
Front-quarter view of the IMSA GTP Jaguar XJR-9

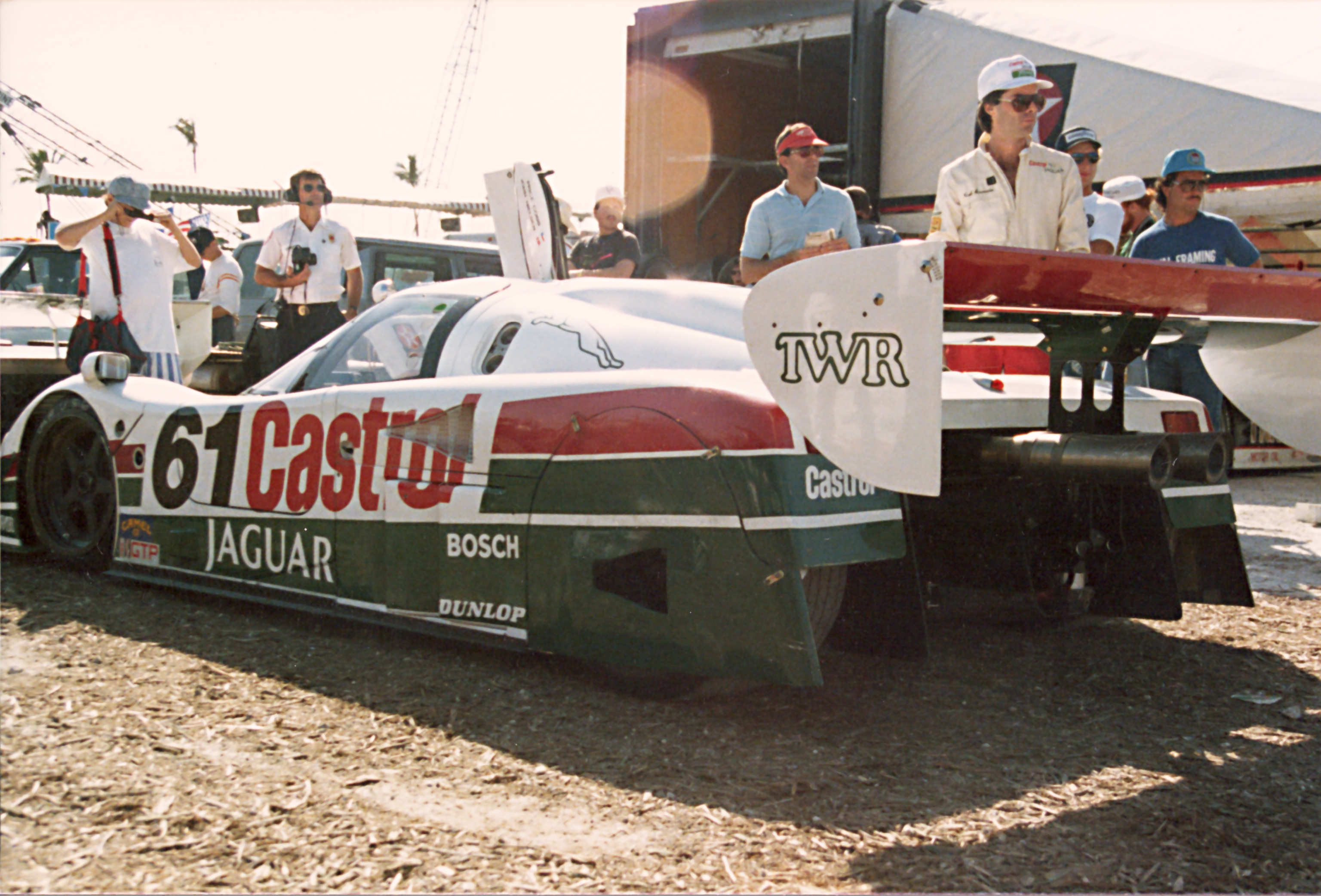
Three-quarter view of the IMSA GTP Jaguar XJR-9

== See also ==
- Jaguar XJR Sportscars

== Bibliography ==
- Bamsey, Ian (1989). Jaguar XJR Group C and GTP Cars. G T Foulis. ISBN 0854297529.
- Thurston, Leslie F. (2003). TWR Jaguar Prototype Racers. Jaguar Daimler Heritage Trust. ISBN 978-0954103910.
- Cotton, Michael (2017). Jaguar XJR-9 Owners Workshop Manual. J.H. Haynes. ISBN 978-1785211133.
