= Le Mans Legend =

Vintage sports car race

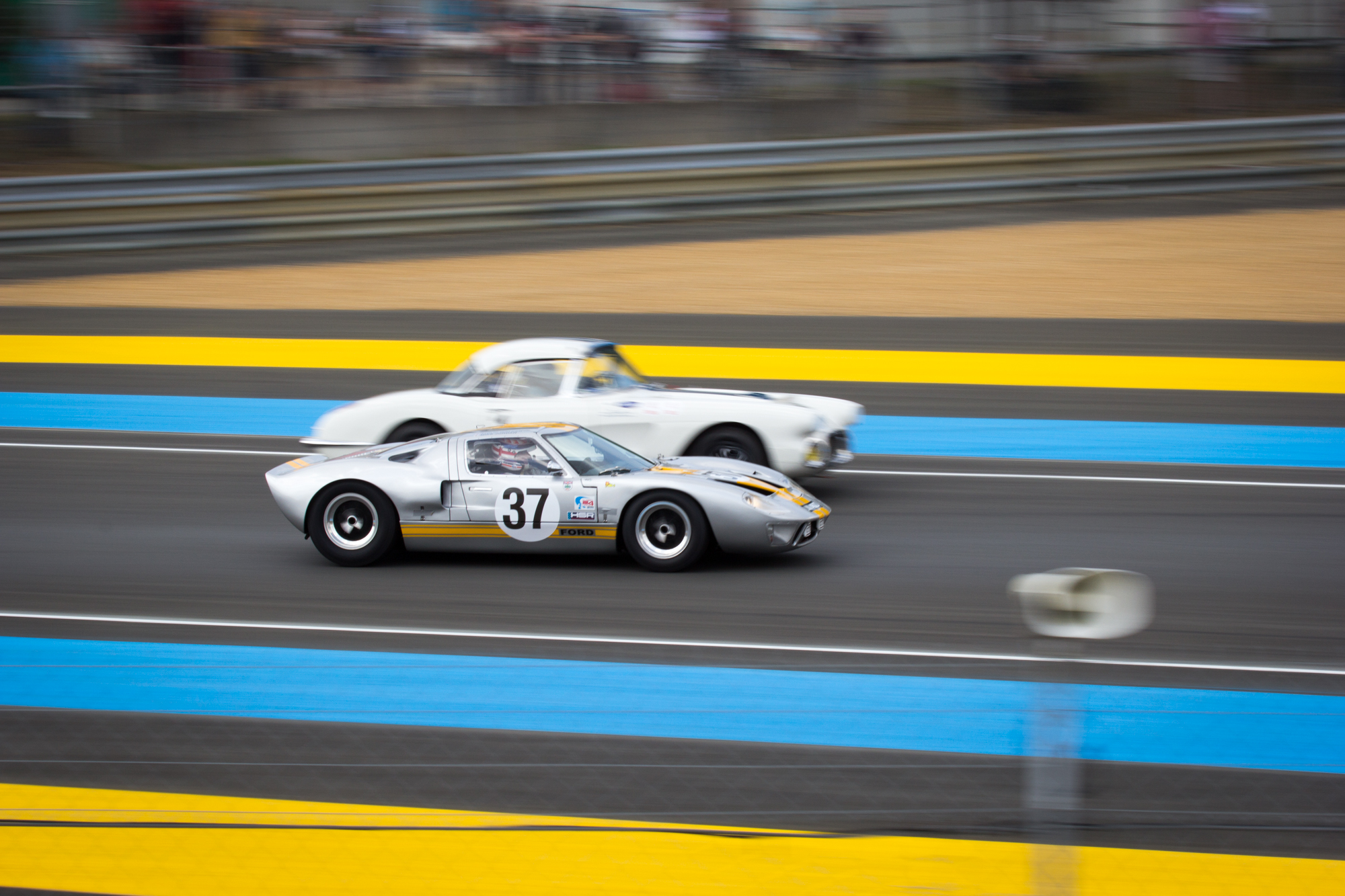
Ford GT40 alongside Chevrolet Corvette in 2015 Le Mans Legend

The Le Mans Legend is a vintage sports car race held during the 24 Hours of Le Mans festivities. Created in 2001, it was created by the Motor Racing Legends group, and supported by the ACO, organizers of the 24 Hours of Le Mans.

Unlike other vintage events, these races only allow cars which previously ran at Le Mans. Specific eras of cars are run each year, with the era changing each year as deemed by the organizers. Cars run the full Circuit de la Sarthe just as they had originally done when they first raced, and are fully timed and scored based on their classes.

Famous Le Mans drivers have often driven in the event, driving cars they had previously run. Stirling Moss was among the notables in recent years, while amateur drivers mostly make up the rest of the field. Dr. Ulrich Bez, former CEO of Aston Martin from 2000 to 2013, has also raced in the event, driving the 1959 winning DBR1 in 2007. A record 61 cars were seen in the event in 2007.

== Previous winners ==
| Year | Driver | Car | Year built | Period of Cars Built & Raced |
|---|---|---|---|---|
| 2015 | Bernard Thuner; Claude Nahum | Ford GT40 | 1968 | Cars from 1949 to 1968 |
| 2014 | Shaun Lynn | Mercedes-Benz C11 | 1990 | Group C/GTP 1982–1993 |
| 2013 | Alex Buncombe | Lister Costin | 1959 | Cars from 1949 to 1965 |
| 2012 | Bob Berridge | Mercedes-Benz C11 | 1990 | Group C/GTP 1982–1993 |
| 2011 | Carlos Monteverde | Ferrari 250 LM | 1964 | Cars from 1949 to 1965 |
| 2010 | Justin Law | Jaguar XJR-9 | 1988 | Group C/GTP 1982–1993 |
| 2009 | Carlos Monteverde | Ferrari 250 LM | 1964 | Cars from 1949 to 1965 |
| 2008 | Justin Law | Jaguar XJR-12 | 1990 | Group C/GTP 1982–1993 |
| 2007 | Shaun Lynn | Ford GT40 | 1965 | Cars from 1956 to 1968 |
| 2006 | Gareth Burnett | Talbot 105 Alpine | 1934 | Pre-War Cars 1923–1939 |
| 2006 | Gary Pearson | Jaguar C-Type | 1952 | Post-War Cars 1949–1954 |
| 2005 | Johnny Herbert | Jaguar D-Type | 1955 | Cars from 1935 to 1955 |
| 2004 | Charlie Agg | Nissan R90CK | 1990 | Group C/GTP 1982–1993 |
| 2003 | Willie Green | Ligier JS2 Ford Cosworth | 1971 | Cars from 1959 to 1971 |
| 2001 | David Piper | Ferrari 250 LM | 1965 | Cars from 1949 to 1965 |
