= Jaguar XJR-10 =

Race car

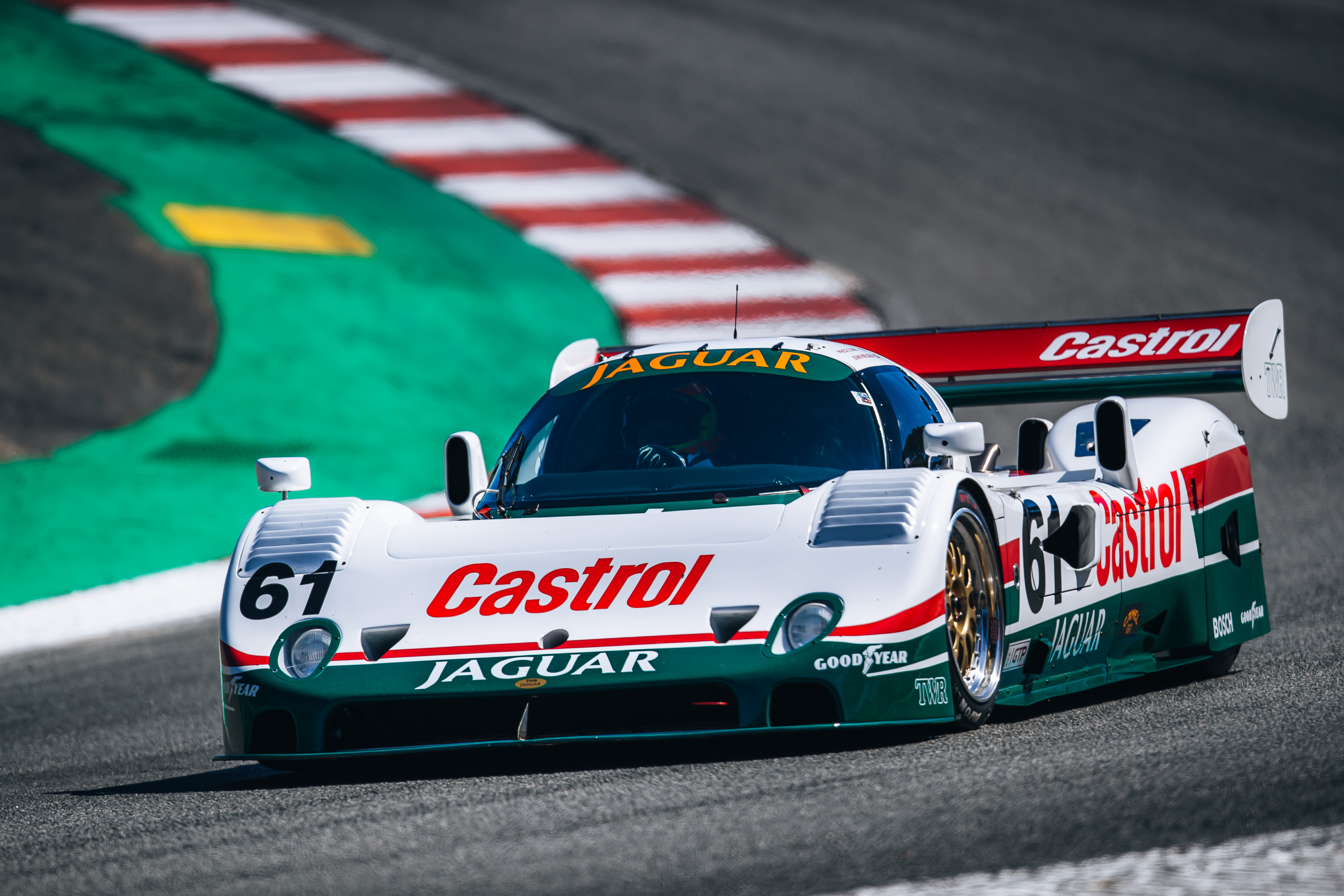
Jaguar XJR-10 at the 2022 Rolex Monterey Motorsports Reunion

The Jaguar XJR-10 is an IMSA GTP sports prototype race car, designed, developed, and built by TWR for Jaguar, with the aim of competing, from 1989, in the IMSA GT Championship. Jaguar XJR-10s competed until 1991, before Jaguar replaced it with the Jaguar XJR-16. The car debuted a new 3.0-liter twin-turbo V6 engine, which replaced the previous V12, and was later fitted to the Jaguar XJ220 as well.

== Wins/Victories ==
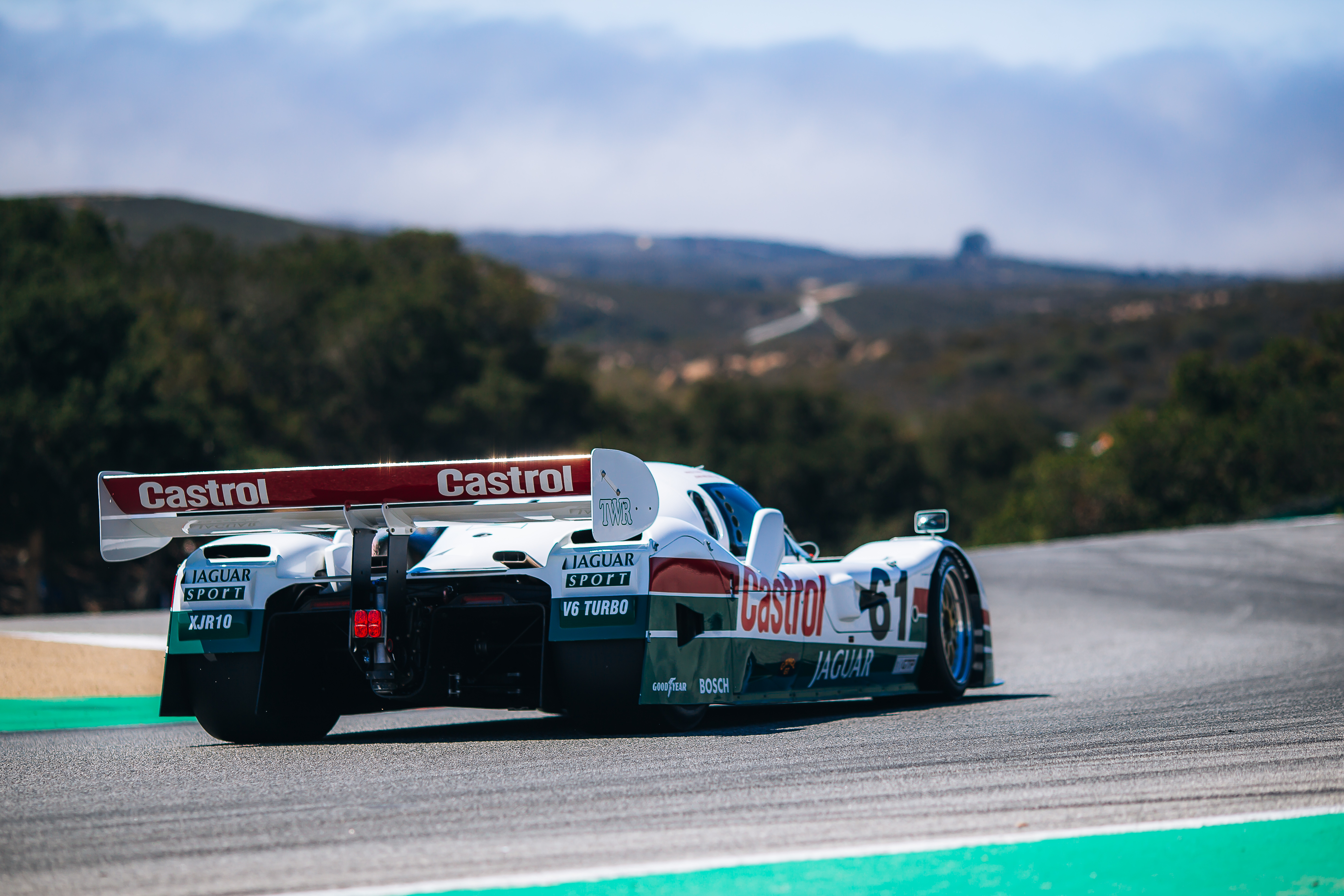
Rear view of Jaguar XJR-10

- 300 km from Portland 1989 (Chassis 389)
- 2 Hours Del Mar 1989 (Chassis 389)
- Lime Rock 150 1990 (Chassis 389)
- 300 km from Portland 1990 (Chassis 589)
- 2 Hours of West Palm Beach 1991 (Chassis 589)
- 2 Hours of Miami 1991 (Chassis 389)

== Drivers ==
- Raul Boesel
- Martin Brundle
- Price Cobb
- Alain Ferté
- David Jones
- Jan Lammers
- David Leslie
- John Nielsen

== See also ==
- Jaguar XJR Sportscars
