= Jaguar XJR-14 =

Sports-prototype racing car (1991–92)

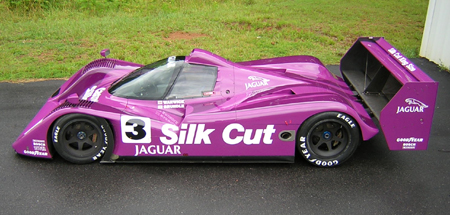
- Category: Group C
- Constructor: Jaguar Cars (Tom Walkinshaw Racing)
- Designers: Ross Brawn; John Piper; Mark Thomas

Technical specifications
- Chassis: Carbon fibre and aluminium honeycomb monocoque, with 4-point, bolt-on steel roll-over hoop
- Length: 4800 mm (189 in)
- Width: 2000 mm (78.7 in)
- Height: 1092 mm (43.0 in)
- Wheelbase: 2807 mm (110.5 in)
- Engine: Cosworth-Ford HB 3500 cc V8. Naturally aspirated mid-mounted
- Transmission: manual transmission
- Weight: 762 kg (1680lbs)
- Tyres: Goodyear

Competition history
- Notable entrants: (United Kingdom) Silk Cut Jaguar (WSC) (United Kingdom) Jaguar Racing (IMSA)
- Notable drivers: (United Kingdom) Derek Warwick (United Kingdom) Martin Brundle (Australia) David Brabham (Italy) Teo Fabi (United States) Davy Jones (Netherlands) Arie Luyendyk
- Debut: 1991 430 km of Suzuka
- Last season: 1992
Races	Wins	Poles	F/Laps
19	6	11	11
- Constructors' Championships: 1 (1991)
- Drivers' Championships: 1 (1991, Teo Fabi)

The Jaguar XJR-14 is a sports-prototype racing car introduced for the 1991 World Sportscar Championship season. It was designed by Ross Brawn and John Piper, and was built and run by Tom Walkinshaw Racing (TWR), on behalf of Jaguar Cars.

== Design ==
The 1991 season marked the introduction of the FIA’s new, and controversial, 3.5 Litre Formula which replaced the highly successful Group C category that had been used in the World Sports Car Championship since 1982. However, due to a small number of entries in the new 3.5 litre formula heavily penalised Group C cars were allowed participate in the newly created C2 category for the 1991 season but Jaguar participated in the new formula.

To comply with the new regulations Jaguar produced an all-new car, the XJR-14. It was designed by Ross Brawn and John Piper, and was built by Tom Walkinshaw Racing (TWR). In the past, TWR's Jaguars had been designed under the direction of Tony Southgate, while Brawn worked with a large design staff (12 according to John Piper); a paradigm shift (albeit small) in its own right and reflective of Brawn's Formula One background.

The abandonment of the Group C fuel consumption regulations meant a change in aerodynamic design philosophy. Coupled that with vastly different packaging requirements for a small, light, normally aspirated engine meant that concerns over drag became a secondary requirement to downforce. The new design targeted a lower kerb weight of 1,650 lb (748 kg) and higher downforce levels meant that the XJR-14 was a lot faster in corners compared to the previous Group C front runners.

== Engine ==
The primary feature of the new regulations centred on 3.5-litre naturally aspirated engines. Although the XJR-14's predecessor, the XJR-11, used a twin turbo-charged 3.5-litre engine derived from the Metro 6R4-derived V64V V6 engine, in order to comply with the new rules the two turbochargers would need to be removed. Naturally this wasn't a realistic option, nor was it ever considered, given the design compromises of not using a bespoke engine.

Given the Jaguar-Ford connection however, it was decided to utilise the 3.5-litre Ford HB V8 Formula One power plant. Developed by Geoff Goddard, and most notably used by the Benetton Formula One team, the now Jaguar-badged HB was detuned to around 11,500 rpm and 650 bhp (compared to the 13,000 rpm and 700 bhp F1 spec) with aims at enhancing reliability.

== Race results ==
Three chassis were built and used for 1991: #591, #691, and #791. In the early part of the 1991 World Sportscar Championship season the XJR-14 was in a league of its own, totally outclassing its rivals and in particular the Peugeot 905 and Mercedes-Benz C291. Only the opening race went Peugeot's way, but that was seen more as a result of luck than the 905's competitiveness. The fact that Jaguar already had a race proven engine certainly helped the team’s cause, but the rest of the car was far superior to its rivals.

It was not until midway through the season that the Jaguar met its match through Peugeot's new 905B. This meant a hard fight with the new and quickly improving Peugeot squad for the rest of the season, but Jaguar was able to hold on and secure the manufacturers title with 3 victories.

At the 1991 24 Hours of Le Mans, Jaguar initially entered two XJR-14s but later decided that the XJR-14 would not be capable of finishing the distance due to unknowns in the development of the Cosworth HB to last 24 hours. Jaguar instead decided to enter three older XJR-12s which entered in the C2 class. Although the XJR-12s did not manage to win, Jaguar's decision not to run the untested XJR-14 was vindicated by the fact that Peugeot's 905 failed to finish the race. Mercedes also withdrew its C291 in favour of its older C11 models.

After 1991, Jaguar decided not to continue in Group C, believing that they had spent enough time in Group C and the instability of rules recently in the World Sportscar Championship. Opting against further development of the XJR-16, TWR sent the XJR-14 to the United States for the 1992 IMSA Camel GTP championship. Chassis 691 (Rebadged as #192) debuted at the 1992 Grand Prix of Miami where it broke the track record by four seconds. Without a major upgrade to the suspension and with the car unable to deal with the high G loads of U.S circuits, the XJR-14 was unable to beat the latest challengers from Toyota and Nissan, forced to finish third in the championship with only two victories. Jaguar continued to use the three updated 1991 chassis throughout the season.

== Derivatives ==
Meanwhile, TWR had reached an agreement to supply more XJR-14 chassis to Mazda, minus the Cosworth V8s but installed with Mazda-badged Judd V10s for the World Sportscar Championship. Mazda would rebadge the XJR-14s as MXR-01s. The MXR-01 was essentially a productionised XJR-14 and as there had been no ongoing development they ended up not being particularly competitive, scoring no wins and finishing third in the championship.

Several years later, TWR would resurrect XJR-14 chassis #691/192 for the development of a new prototype for Porsche. They renamed the car the TWR-Porsche WSC-95. Its most significant feature was that it had the roof removed, turning it into an open cockpit prototype to run under the then-new LMP regulations. The WSC-95 would carry a Porsche 3.0L turbocharged Flat-6. After chassis #691 was modified, TWR built a second WSC-95 from scratch. In both the 1996 and 1997 24 Hours of Le Mans, the TWR-Porsches were able to take the overall win. See Chassis Log.

== Chassis log ==
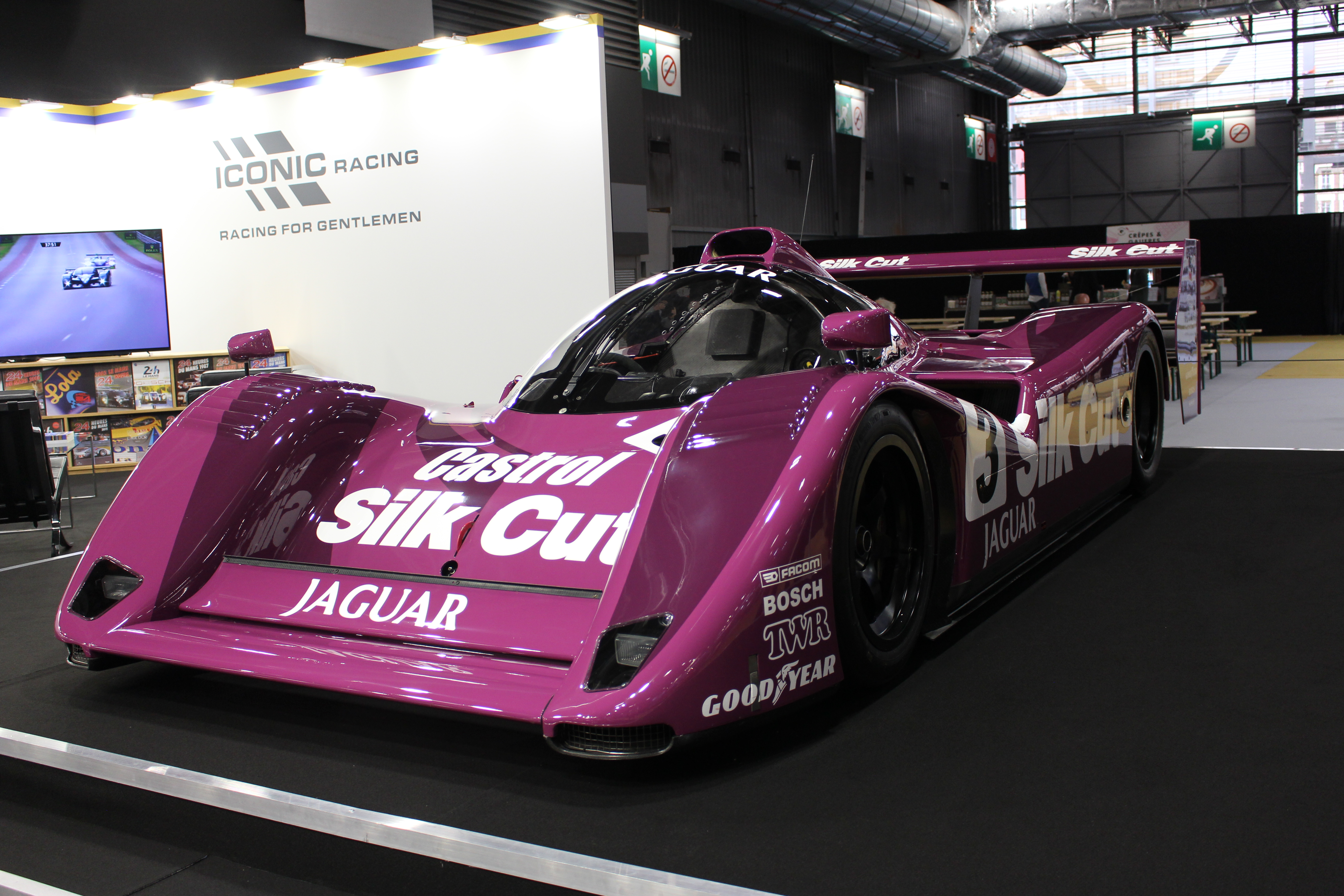
XJR14 chassis X91 on display at 2023 Retromobile at the Paris Expo.

=== Chassis 591 ===
1991: Suzuka (DNF), Monza (1st), Silverstone (3rd), Autopolis (2nd). 1992: Laguna Seca (4th), Road America (crash in warm-up).

Rebuilt to running order at TWR, sold to US collector (2003-2009). Sold to Chamberlain-Synergy, England (2009-2015) Location: MecAuto, Belgium, since 2015.

=== Chassis 691/192 ===
1991: Suzuka (DNF), Monza (2nd), Silverstone (1st), Nurburgring (2nd), Magny Cours (3rd), Mexico (did not race), Autopolis (3rd), Sugo (1st). 1992 (chassis number changed to 192): Mid-Ohio (1st), New Orleans (4th), Watkins Glen (3rd), Laguna Seca (3rd), Portland (DNF), Phoenix (2nd), Del Mar (3rd-DNF).

Converted to a Porsche WSC95 Spyder in late 1994, raced at Le Mans in 1996 and 1997 by Reinhold Joest, winning the race on both occasions. Location: now in Reinhold Joest's private collection.

=== Chassis 791 ===
1991: Nürburgring (1st), Magny Cours (5th), Mexico (6th), Sugo (9th). 1992: Miami (6th-DNF), Road Atlanta (1st), Lime Rock (accident in race).

Rebuilt by Retract Composite and Lanzante Motorsport. Now as Show Car. Location: Previously England with same owner as X91 in 2014-2015, but since sold and exported to the U.S. in 2017.

=== Chassis X91 ===
New chassis tub built in 2003 before TWR liquidation. Location: Lanzante Motorsports, South of England (2003-2014). Sold in 2015 to new owner in England.

== See also ==
- Jaguar XJR Sportscars
- Mazda MXR-01
- TWR WSC-95
