= Jaguar XJR-16 =

Sports prototype race car

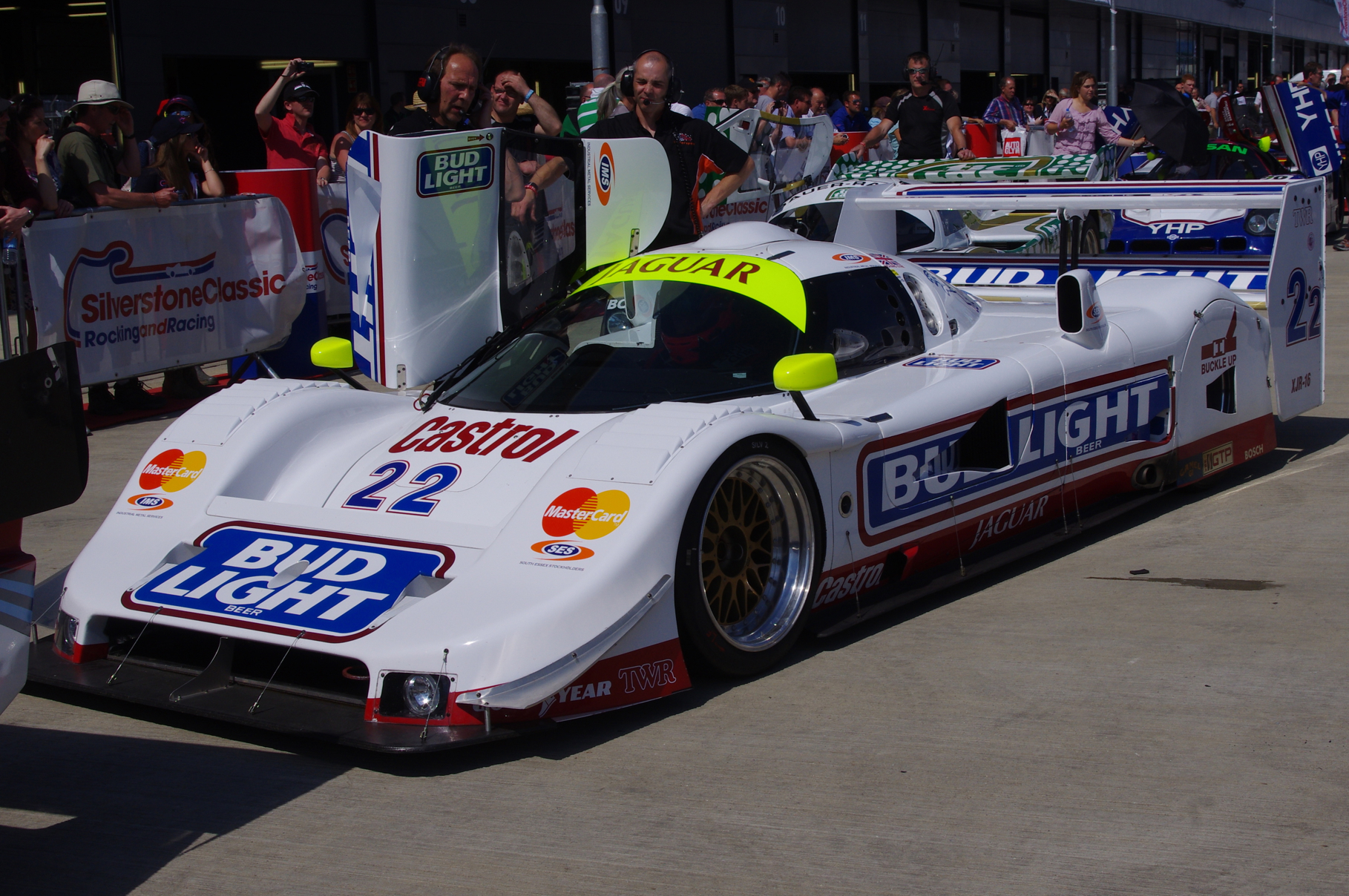
Jaguar XJR-16

The Jaguar XJR-16 is an IMSA GTP sports prototype race car, with the aim of competing, from 1991, in the IMSA GT Championship. The Jaguar XJR-16s had a short lifespan, competing for only one season, before being hastily replaced with the Jaguar XJR-14.

== Wins/Victories ==
- 300 km of Road Atlanta 1991 (Chassis 191)
- 1991 Mid-Ohio 300 km (Chassis 191)
- 1991 Laguna Seca 300km (Chassis 191)
- 300 km of Road America 1991 (Chassis 191)

== Drivers ==
- David Jones
- Cor Euser
- Scott Pruett
- Scott Goodyear
- Martin Brundle
- David Brabham

== See also ==
- Jaguar XJR Sportscars
