= Price Cobb =

American racecar driver (born 1954)

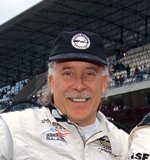
- Cobb at the 1997 24 Hours of Le Mans
- Nationality: (United States) American
- Born: Price Daniel Cobb; December 10, 1954 (age 71) Dallas, Texas, U.S.

24 Hours of Le Mans career
- Years: 1986 – 1990, 1996 – 1997
- Teams: Liqui Moly Equipe; Silk Cut Jaguar / TWR; Canaska Southwind Motorsport; Saleen/Allen Speedlab
- Best finish: 1st (1990)
- Class wins: 1 (1990)

Price Daniel Cobb (born December 10, 1954) is an American race car driver. He won the 1990 24 Hours of Le Mans together with John Nielsen and Martin Brundle in a Jaguar XJR-12. He also owned an Indy Racing League team, CBR Cobb Racing, in 1998 and 1999 for Roberto Guerrero and Jim Guthrie. He also has authored a number of books on auto racing.

Cobb won the Porsche Cup, an annual award presented by Porsche AG to recognize the world's most successful privateer racing driver competing with Porsche machinery in a customer racing team, in 1994.

Cobb is retired from most recently working in Austin, Texas with Moorespeed as general manager.

== Racing record ==
=== SCCA National Championship Runoffs ===
Year	Track	Car	Engine	Class	Finish	Start	Status
1977	Road Atlanta	March 77B	Ford	Formula B	2	3	Running

=== 24 Hours of Le Mans results ===
Year	Team	Co-drivers	Car	Class	Laps	Pos.	Class pos.
1986	(United Kingdom) Liqui Moly Equipe	(Italy) Mauro Baldi (United States) Rob Dyson	Porsche 956 GTi	C1	318	9th	7th
1987	(United Kingdom) Liqui Moly Equipe	(United Kingdom) Jonathan Palmer (United Kingdom) James Weaver	Porsche 962C GTi	C1	112	DNF	DNF
1988	(United Kingdom) Silk Cut Jaguar / TWR	(United States) Davy Jones (United States) Danny Sullivan	Jaguar XJR-9LM	C1	331	16th	14th
1989	(United Kingdom) Silk Cut Jaguar / TWR	(Denmark) John Nielsen (United Kingdom) Andy Wallace	Jaguar XJR-9LM	C1	215	DNF	DNF
1990	(United Kingdom) Silk Cut Jaguar / TWR	(United Kingdom) Martin Brundle (Denmark) John Nielsen	Jaguar XJR-12	C1	359	1st	1st
1996	(United States) Canaska Southwind Motorsport	(United States) Mark Dismore (United States) Shawn Hendricks	Chrysler Viper GTS-R	LMGT1	320	10th	8th
1997	(United States) Saleen/Allen Speedlab	(Spain) Carlos Palau (United States) Steve Saleen	Saleen Mustang SR	LMGT2	133	DNF	DNF

Sporting positions
Preceded by Jochen Mass; Manuel Reuter; Stanley Dickens	Winner of the 24 Hours of Le Mans; 1990 with: John Nielsen; Martin Brundle	Succeeded by Volker Weidler; Johnny Herbert; Bertrand Gachot
