= Jaguar XJR-12 =

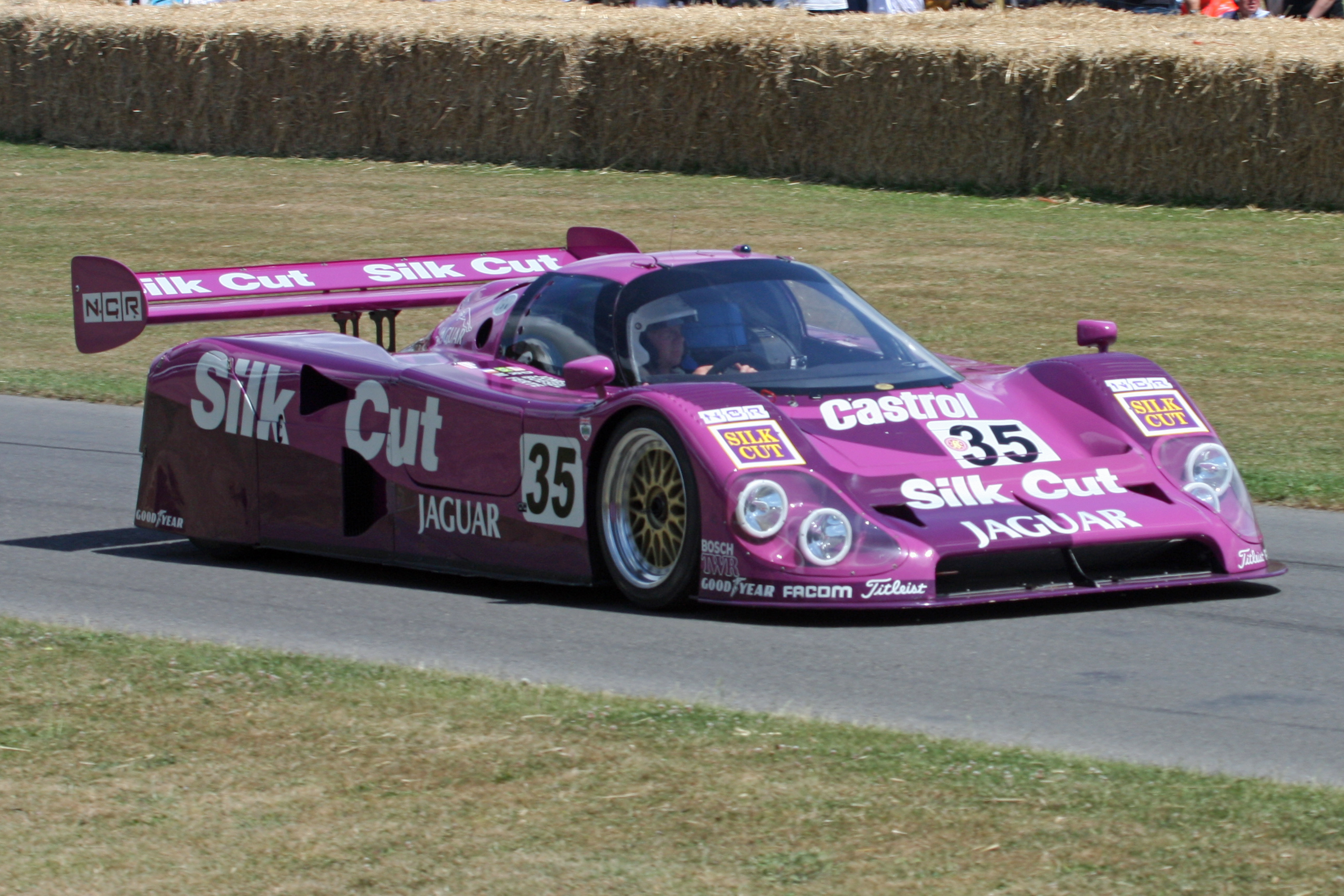

Overview
- Manufacturer: Jaguar Cars
- Production: 1990
- Designer: Tony Southgate for TWR

Body and chassis
- Class: Racing car
- Body style: 2-door coupé
- Layout: RMR layout

Powertrain
- Engine: 7.0 L (6,995 cc) Jaguar 60-degree V12 and 7.4 v12
- Transmission: 5-speed TWR manual

Dimensions
- Wheelbase: 2,780 mm (109 in)
- Length: 4,800 mm (189 in)
- Width: 2,000 mm (79 in)
- Height: 1,010 mm (40 in)
- Kerb weight: 900 kg (1,984 lb)

Chronology
- Predecessor: Jaguar XJR-11
- Successor: Jaguar XJR-14

1990 Jaguar XJR12
Jaguar XJR12 at Goodwood Festival of Speed 2009

The Jaguar XJR-12 is a sports-prototype race car built by the Jaguar Cars-backed Tom Walkinshaw Racing team for both Group C and IMSA Camel GTP. The XJR-12 is famous for winning the 1990 24 Hours of Le Mans race.

Weighing 900 kg and powered by a 7.0 L 60 degree SOHC V12 developing 730 horsepower / 545 kW @ 7000 rpm, and 579 ft lbf / 785 N·m @ 5500 rpm, the XJR-12 could hit 368 km/h / 229 mph.

During the 1990 24 Hours of Le Mans, the XJR-12 covered 4,882.4 km at an average speed of 204.036 km/h / 126.782 mph with a maximum trap speed of 353 km/h / 219 mph.

"For the 1991 and 1992 seasons, engine specialist Allan Scott enhanced the V12, boring it out to a 7.4-litre specification producing 750 hp for IMSA and Group C competition.

== 24 Hours of Le Mans results ==
Year	Team	Drivers	Car #	Class	Laps	Pos.	Class Pos.
1990	(United Kingdom) Silk Cut Jaguar (United Kingdom) Tom Walkingshaw Racing	(France) Alain Ferté (United Kingdom) David Leslie (United Kingdom) Martin Brundle	1	C1	220	DNF	DNF
1990	(United Kingdom) Silk Cut Jaguar (United Kingdom) Tom Walkingshaw Racing	(Netherlands) Jan Lammers (United Kingdom) Andy Wallace (Austria) Franz Konrad	2	C1	355	2nd	2nd
1990	(United Kingdom) Silk Cut Jaguar (United Kingdom) Tom Walkingshaw Racing	(Denmark) John Nielsen (United States) Price Cobb (United Kingdom) Martin Brundle	3	C1	359	1st	1st
1990	(United Kingdom) Silk Cut Jaguar (United Kingdom) Tom Walkingshaw Racing	(United States) Davy Jones (France) Michel Ferté (Chile) Eliseo Salazar	4	C1	282	DNF	DNF
1991	(United Kingdom) Silk Cut Jaguar (United Kingdom) Tom Walkingshaw Racing	(United Kingdom) Derek Warwick (Denmark) John Nielsen (United Kingdom) Andy Wallace	33	Category 2	356	4th	4th
1991	(United Kingdom) Silk Cut Jaguar (United Kingdom) Tom Walkingshaw Racing	(France) Bob Wollek (Italy) Teo Fabi (United Kingdom) Kenny Acheson	34	Category 2	358	3rd	3rd
1991	(United Kingdom) Silk Cut Jaguar (United Kingdom) Tom Walkingshaw Racing	(United States) Davy Jones (Brazil) Raul Boesel (France) Michel Ferté	35	Category 2	360	2nd	2nd

== See also ==
- Jaguar XJR sportscars
