= 1993 12 Hours of Sebring =

Sports car endurance race

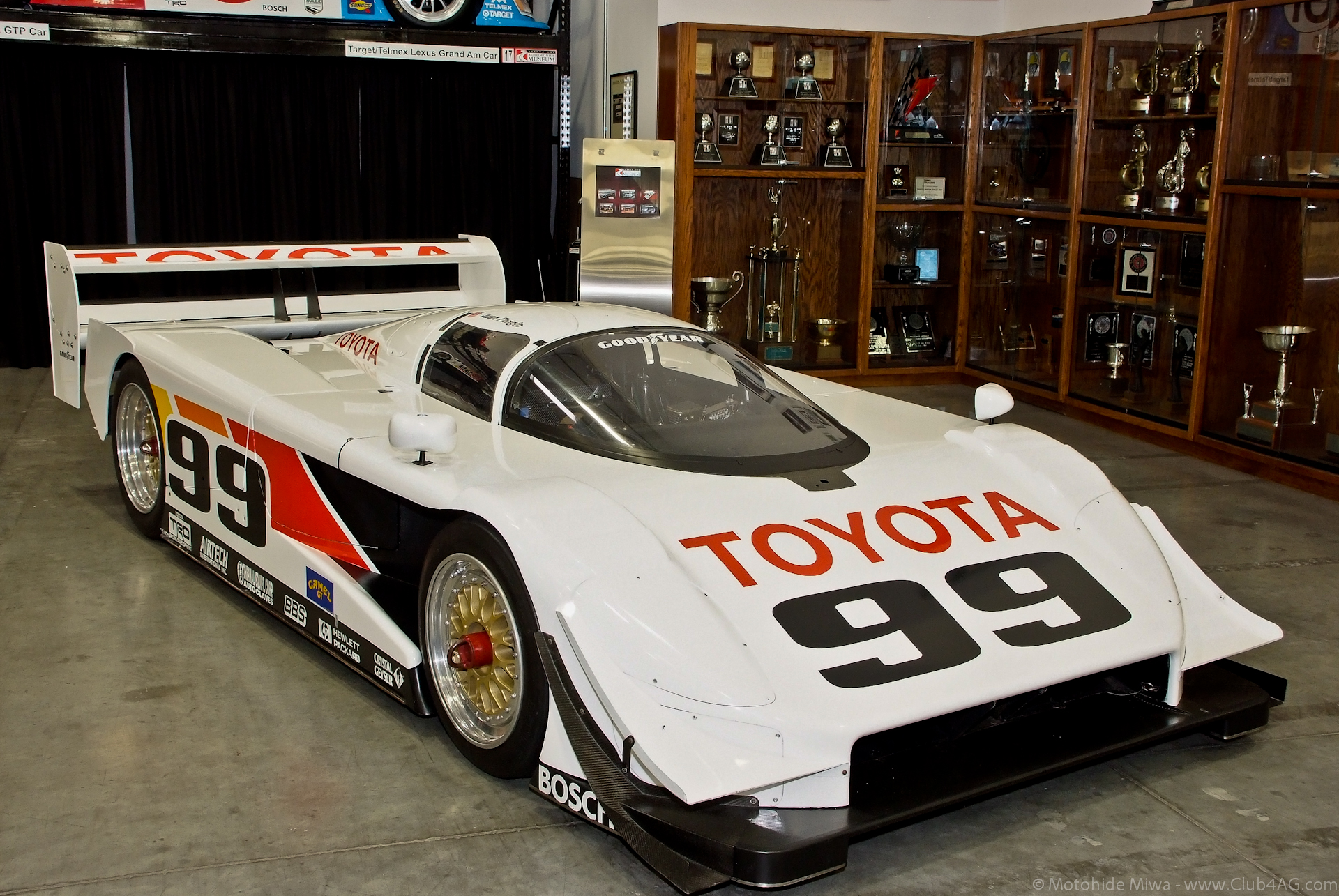
The race winning Eagle MkIII of Fangio II/Wallace

The Camel 12 Hours of Sebring, was the third round of the 1993 IMSA GT Championship and was held at the Sebring International Raceway, on March 20, 1993. Victory overall went to the No. 99 All American Racers Eagle MkIII driven by Juan Manuel Fangio II and Andy Wallace.

== Race results ==
Class winners in bold.

Pos	Class	No	Team	Drivers	Car	Laps
1	**GTP**	**99**	**(United States) All American Racers**	**(Argentina) Juan Manuel Fangio II (United Kingdom) Andy Wallace**	**Eagle MkIII**	**230**
2	GTP	30	(Italy) Momo	(Italy) Giampiero Moretti (United Kingdom) Derek Bell (United States) John Paul Jr.	Nissan NPT-90	228
3 DNF	GTP	98	(United States) All American Racers	(United States) P. J. Jones (United States) Rocky Moran	Eagle MkIII	217
4	**GTS**	**1**	**(United States) Cunningham Racing**	**(United States) John Morton (United States) Johnny O'Connell (New Zealand) Steve Millen**	**Nissan 300ZX Turbo**	**217**
5	**Lights**	**49**	**(United States) Comptech Racing**	**(United States) Parker Johnstone (United States) Dan Marvin (Italy) Ruggero Melgrati**	**Spice SE91P**	**216**
6	GTS	11	(United States) Roush Racing	(United States) Tommy Kendall (United States) John Fergus	Ford Mustang Cobra	216
7	**INV GT**	**59**	**(United States) Brumos Porsche**	**(Germany) Walter Röhrl (Germany) Hans-Joachim Stuck (United States) Hurley Haywood**	**Porsche 964 Turbo**	**214**
8	GTS	31	(United States) Rocketsports Racing	(United States) Dorsey Schroeder (United Kingdom) Calvin Fish (United States) Paul Gentilozzi	Oldsmobile Cutlass	214
9	Lights	9	(United States) Brix Racing	(United States) Bob Earl (United States) Bob Schader (Canada) Jeremy Dale	Spice AK93	213
10	GTS	51	(United States) Rocketsports Racing	(United States) Scott Pruett (United States) Darin Brassfield	Oldsmobile Cutlass	213
11	GTP	19	(Canada) David Tennyson Racing/Spice USA	(Canada) David Tennyson (France) François Migault (United States) Steve Fossett (United States) Hugh Fuller	Spice SE92P	210
12	GTP	20	(United States) Hotchkis Racing	(United States) Jim Adams (United States) Chris Cord	Porsche 962	205
13	Lights	63	(United States) Downing/Atlanta	(United States) Tim McAdam (United States) Howard Katz (United States) Jim Downing	Kudzu DG-1	204
14	INV GT	94	(United States) Morrison Motorsports	(United States) John Heinricy (United States) Stu Hayner (United States) Andy Pilgrim	Chevrolet Corvette	202
15	INV GT	93	(United States) Morrison Motorsports	(United States) Andy Pilgrim (Germany) Ronny Meixner (United States) Boris Said (United States) Ron Nelson (United States) Don Knowles	Chevrolet Corvette	200
16	**GTU**	**82**	**(United States) Dick Greer Racing**	**(United States) Al Bacon (United States) Dick Greer (United States) Peter Uria (United States) Mike Mees**	**Mazda RX-7**	**200**
17	INV GT	28	(United States) Cigarette Racing	(Italy) Luigino Pagotto (Switzerland) Enzo Calderari (Germany) Ronny Meixner	Porsche 964 Carrera	199
18	GTU	26	(United States) Alex Job Racing	(United States) Butch Hamlet (United States) Bill Ferran (United States) Charles Slater	Porsche 911	199
19	INV GT	01	(United States) Rohr Engineering	(United States) Jochen Rohr (United States) John O'Steen (United States) Rick Moskalik (United States) Dave White	Porsche 964 Carrera	197
20	INV GT	0	(United States) Ed Arnold Racing	(Austria) Dieter Quester (United Kingdom) Chris Hodgetts (United States) David Donohue	BMW M5	195
21	INV GT	48	(United States) Champion Porsche	(United Kingdom) Justin Bell (United States) Mike Peters (Germany) Oliver Kuttner	Porsche 964 Carrera	194
22	GTS	35	(United States) Bill McDill	(United States) Richard McDill (United States) Tom Juckette (United States) Bill McDill	Chevrolet Camaro	194
23	GTS	90	(United States) Les Delano	(United States) Andy Petery (United States) John Macaluso (United States) Tommy Schweitz	Pontiac Firebird	192
24	GTS	22	(United States) John Josey	(United States) Luis Sereix (United States) Gene Whipp (United States) Daniel Urrutia	Chevrolet Camaro	190
25	GTS	21	(United States) Bruce Trenery	(United States) Bruce Trenery (Australia) Andrew Osman (United States) Kent Painter	Chevrolet Camaro	186
26	GTU	57	(United States) Kryderacing	(United States) Reed Kryder (France) Guy Kuster	Nissan 240SX	186
27	GTS	2	(United States) Ed Sharp	(United States) Dick Downs (United States) Eddie Sharp (United States) Eddie Sharp Jr.	Oldsmobile Cutlass	183
28 DNF	GTS	76	(United States) Cunningham Racing	(United States) Tommy Riggins (United States) John Morton	Nissan 300ZX Turbo	182
29 DNF	GTP	7	(Germany) Joest Porsche Racing	(United States) Chip Robinson (Germany) Manuel Reuter (Germany) "John Winter"	Porsche 962	180
30	Lights	42	(United States) ZZ Pro-Technik Racing	(United States) Mike Sheehan (Switzerland) Philippe Favre (Germany) Gustl Spreng (United States) Sam Shalala (United States) Anthony Lazzaro	Fabcar CL	180
31	INV GT	45	(Italy) Antica AB	(Canada) Vito Scavone (Canada) Rich Heyward (Canada) Terry Martel	Porsche 944 Turbo	179
32	GTU	58	(United States) ZZ Pro-Technik Racing	(Canada) Ernie Lader (United States) Haas Fogle (United States) Curt Catallo (United States) Frank Beard	Porsche 911	177
33 DNF	GTU	95	(United States) Leitzinger Racing	(United States) Don Knowles (United States) Bob Leitzinger	Nissan 240SX	174
34	GTS	87	(United States) John Annis	(United States) John Annis (United States) Louis Beall (United States) Kenper Miller	Chevrolet Camaro	173
35	GTU	91	(United States) Team Casual Motorsport	(United States) C. Lorin Hicks (United States) Mel Butt (United States) Ron Zitza (United States) Tommy Johnson	Porsche 911	169
36	GTU	24	(Peru) Dibos Racing	(United States) Bill Auberlen (Peru) Eduardo Dibós Chappuis	Mazda MX-6	166
37 DNF	GTP	5	(United States) Auto Toy Store	(South Africa) Wayne Taylor (United States) Jeff Andretti (United States) Morris Shirazi	Spice SE90P	165
38	Lights	40	(Canada) Bieri Racing	(Canada) John Jones (Canada) Neil Jamieson (Canada) Jeff Lapcevich	Alba AR2/6	165
39 DNF	GTS	50	(United States) Overbagh Racing	(United States) Oma Kimbrough (United States) Mark Montgomery (United States) Robert McElheny (United States) Bob Hundredmark (United States) Hoyt Overbagh	Chevrolet Camaro	136
40 DNF	GTS	32	(United States) Carolina Racing	(United States) Gary Smith (United States) Mark Kennedy (United States) Robert Borders	Pontiac Grand Prix	121
41	GTS	67	(Argentina) Paul Mazzacane	(Argentina) Paul Mazzacane (United States) Chester Edwards (United States) Peter Argetsinger	Chevrolet Camaro	112
42 DNF	INV GT	16	(United States) Scott Clarke	(Canada) Ludwig Heimrath (United States) Ken McKinnon (United States) Tom Rathbun (United States) Bernadette Hubbard	Porsche 944 Turbo	111
43	Lights	12	(United States) Steve Sirgany	(United States) James Lee (United States) Steven Sirgany (United States) Cliff Rassweiler	Phoenix	98
44 DNF	GTU	70	(United States) Kenneth Brady	(United States) Dom DeLuca (United States) Bill Weston	Mazda MX-6	93
45 DNF	GTP	66	(United States) Team Gunnar	(United States) Jay Cochran (United States) Chip Hanauer (United States) Bobby Carradine (United States) Dennis Aase	Gunnar 966	47
46 DNF	INV GT	15	(United States) Scott Clarke	(United States) Lance Stewart (United States) Ed Hubbard (New Zealand) Rob Wilson	Porsche 944 Turbo	42
47 DNF	INV GT	41	(Germany) Bernt Motorsport	(Germany) Andreas Fuchs (Belgium) Philippe de Craene	Porsche 964 Carrera	32

=== Class Winners ===
Class	Winners	
GTP	Fangio II / Wallace	Eagle MkIII
Lights	Johnstone / Marvin / Melgrati	Spice SE91P
GTS	Morton / O'Connell / Millen	Nissan 300ZX Turbo
INV GT	Röhrl / Stuck / Haywood	Porsche 911 Turbo
GTU	Bacon / Greer / Uria / Mees	Mazda RX-7
