= 1993 IMSA GT Championship =

23rd season of the racing series organized by IMSA

Seasons
- ← 1992 1994 →

The 1993 Camel GT Championship and Exxon Supreme GT Championship seasons were the 23rd season of the IMSA GT Championship auto racing series. It was the final year of the Camel's sponsorship of the prototype class, and the final year of the GTP and GTP Lights prototype categories before they were replaced with the World Sports Car (WSC) class of prototypes the following year.

== Schedule ==
The GT classes did not participate in all events. Races marked with All had all classes on track at the same time.

Rnd	Race	Length	Class	Circuit	Date
1	Rolex 24 at Daytona	24 Hours	All	(United States) Daytona International Speedway Road Course	January 30 January 31
2	Toyota Grand Prix of Miami	1 Hour 45 Minutes	Proto	(United States) Streets of Miami	February 21
2	Toyota Grand Prix of Miami	1 Hour	GT	(United States) Streets of Miami	February 21
3	Camel 12 Hours of Sebring	12 Hours	All	(United States) Sebring International Raceway	March 20
4	Toyota Grand Prix of Atlanta	1 Hour 45 Minutes	Proto	(United States) Atlanta Motor Speedway Roval	April 18
5	Toyota Trucks Lime Rock Grand Prix	2 Hours	Proto	(United States) Lime Rock Park	May 31
6	Nissan Grand Prix of Ohio	1 Hour	GT	(United States) Mid-Ohio Sports Car Course	June 12
6	Nissan Grand Prix of Ohio	2 Hours	Proto	(United States) Mid-Ohio Sports Car Course	June 13
7	Camel Continental Grand Prix	500 km	All	(United States) Watkins Glen International Short Course	June 27
8	Piggly Wiggly Grand Prix	500 km	All	(United States) Road America	July 11
9	Monterey Camel GT	1 Hour	GT	(United States) Laguna Seca Raceway	July 24
9	Monterey Camel GT	1 Hour 45 Minutes	Proto	(United States) Laguna Seca Raceway	July 25
10	G.I. Joe's/Camel Grand Prix	1 Hour 45 Minutes	Proto	(United States) Portland International Raceway	August 1
10	G.I. Joe's/Camel Grand Prix	1 Hour	GT	(United States) Portland International Raceway	August 1
11	The Checker Camel Grand Prix	2 Hours	Proto	(United States) Phoenix International Raceway	October 2
11	The Checker Camel Grand Prix	1 Hour	GT	(United States) Phoenix International Raceway	October 3

== Entries ==
=== Prototypes ===
==== GTP ====
Team	Car	No.	Drivers	Rounds
(United States) J&P Motorsports	Spice SE89P-Chevrolet	0	(United States) Hugh Fuller	7
(United States) J&P Motorsports	Spice SE89P-Chevrolet	0	(United Kingdom) Chris Hodgetts	7
(United States) Auto Toy Store	Spice SE90C-Cosworth	4	(Brazil) Raul Boesel	2
(United States) Auto Toy Store	Spice SE90P-Chevrolet	5	(United States) Jeff Andretti	2-3
(United States) Auto Toy Store	Spice SE90P-Chevrolet	5	(South Africa) Wayne Taylor	3
(United States) Auto Toy Store	Spice SE90P-Chevrolet	5	(United Kingdom) James Weaver	3
(United States) Auto Toy Store	Spice SE90P-Chevrolet	5	(United States) Morris Shirazi	3
(Germany) Joest Racing	Porsche 962C	6	(United States) Hurley Haywood	1, 7
(Germany) Joest Racing	Porsche 962C	6	(United States) Chip Robinson	1
(Germany) Joest Racing	Porsche 962C	6	(United States) Danny Sullivan	1
(Germany) Joest Racing	Porsche 962C	6	(France) Henri Pescarolo	1
(Germany) Joest Racing	Porsche 962C	6	(France) Bob Wollek	4, 11
(Germany) Joest Racing	Porsche 962C	6	(Germany) Ronny Meixner	4
(Germany) Joest Racing	Porsche 962C	6	(Germany) "John Winter"	11
(Germany) Joest Racing	Porsche 962C	7	(Germany) Manuel Reuter	1-4, 7–8, 11
(Germany) Joest Racing	Porsche 962C	7	(Germany) "John Winter"	1-4, 7–8, 11
(Germany) Joest Racing	Porsche 962C	7	(Germany) Frank Jelinski	1
(Germany) Joest Racing	Porsche 962C	7	(France) Bob Wollek	1
(Germany) Joest Racing	Porsche 962C	7	(United States) Chip Robinson	3
(Germany) Joest Racing	Porsche 962C	77	(United States) John Paul Jr.	8
(South Africa) Wayne Taylor	Intrepid RM-1-Chevrolet	8	(South Africa) Wayne Taylor	2, 4-11
(South Africa) Wayne Taylor	Intrepid RM-1-Chevrolet	8	(South Africa) George Fouché	2
(United States) Dyson Racing	Porsche 962	16	(United Kingdom) James Weaver	1
(United States) Dyson Racing	Porsche 962	16	(United States) Rob Dyson	1
(United States) Dyson Racing	Porsche 962	16	(United States) Price Cobb	1
(United States) Dyson Racing	Porsche 962	16	(United States) Elliott Forbes-Robinson	1
(Canada) David Tennyson Racing	Spice SE92P-Chevrolet	19	(Canada) David Tennyson	2-4
(Canada) David Tennyson Racing	Spice SE92P-Chevrolet	19	(United States) Price Cobb	2
(Canada) David Tennyson Racing	Spice SE92P-Chevrolet	19	(France) François Migault	3
(Canada) David Tennyson Racing	Spice SE92P-Chevrolet	19	(United States) Steve Fossett	3
(Canada) David Tennyson Racing	Spice SE92P-Chevrolet	19	(United States) Hugh Fuller	3
(Canada) David Tennyson Racing	Spice AK93-Chevrolet	19	(United States) Jay Cochran	5
(Canada) David Tennyson Racing	Spice AK93-Chevrolet	19	(United States) Price Cobb	9
(Canada) David Tennyson Racing	Spice AK93-Chevrolet	19	(Canada) David Tennyson	10
(United States) Hotchkis Racing	Porsche 962	20	(United States) Jim Adams	1, 3
(United States) Hotchkis Racing	Porsche 962	20	(United States) Chris Cord	1, 3
(United States) Hotchkis Racing	Porsche 962	20	(United States) Robert Kirby	1
(United States) Hotchkis Racing	Porsche 962	20	(United States) John Hotchkis	1
(Italy) Momo	Nissan NPT-90	30	(United Kingdom) Derek Bell	1-8, 10-11
(Italy) Momo	Nissan NPT-90	30	(Italy) Giampiero Moretti	All
(Italy) Momo	Nissan NPT-90	30	(Italy) Massimo Sigala	1, 9
(Italy) Momo	Nissan NPT-90	30	(United States) John Paul Jr.	1, 3
(Italy) Momo	Nissan NPT-90	30	(France) François Migault	1
(United Kingdom) Bob Pond Racing	Allard J2X-C-Cosworth	48	(United Kingdom) Robs Lamplough	9
(United States) Chevron Race Cars USA	Chevron B65-Buick	65	(United States) Dick Leppla	6
(United States) Team Gunnar	Gunnar 966-Porsche	66	(United States) Dennis Aase	1, 3
(United States) Team Gunnar	Gunnar 966-Porsche	66	(United States) Jay Cochran	1, 3
(United States) Team Gunnar	Gunnar 966-Porsche	66	(United States) Chip Hanauer	1, 3
(United States) Team Gunnar	Gunnar 966-Porsche	66	(El Salvador) Carlos Morán	1
(United States) Team Gunnar	Gunnar 966-Porsche	66	(United States) Bobby Carradine	1, 3
(United States) Team Gunnar	Gunnar 966-Porsche	66	(United States) John Paul Jr.	5, 8-11
(United States) Team Gunnar	Gunnar 966-Porsche	66	(United States) Charles Slater	8-11
private entrant	Spice SE87C-Ford	71	(Canada) Miroslav Jonak	6
(Italy) Euromotorsport	Nissan NPT-90	96	(Italy) Massimo Sigala	2
(Italy) Euromotorsport	Nissan NPT-90	96	(United States) Victor Gonzalez	2
(United States) All American Racers	Eagle MkIII-Toyota	98	(United States) P. J. Jones	1-7, 9-11
(United States) All American Racers	Eagle MkIII-Toyota	98	(United States) Rocky Moran	1, 3
(United States) All American Racers	Eagle MkIII-Toyota	98	(United States) Mark Dismore	1
(United States) All American Racers	Eagle MkIII-Toyota	99	(Argentina) Juan Manuel Fangio II	1-7, 9-11
(United States) All American Racers	Eagle MkIII-Toyota	99	(United Kingdom) Andy Wallace	1, 3
(United States) All American Racers	Eagle MkIII-Toyota	99	(United Kingdom) Kenny Acheson	1

==== GTP Lights ====
Team	Car	No.	Drivers	Rounds
(United States) Autovolante	Phoenix JG2-Alfa Romeo	0	(El Salvador) Carlos Morán	2
(United States) Autovolante	Phoenix JG2-Alfa Romeo	12	(United States) Steven Sirgany	3, 6
(United States) Autovolante	Phoenix JG2-Alfa Romeo	12	(United States) James Lee	3
(United States) Autovolante	Phoenix JG2-Alfa Romeo	12	(United States) Cliff Rassweiler	3
(United States) Autovolante	Phoenix JG2-Alfa Romeo	12	(United States) Edd Davin	3
(United States) Autovolante	Phoenix JG2-Alfa Romeo	12	(United Kingdom) Steve Deeks	6
(United States) Brix Racing	Spice AK93-Acura	9	(United States) Bob Earl	1-10
(United States) Brix Racing	Spice AK93-Acura	9	(United States) Bob Schader	1-4, 6-11
(United States) Brix Racing	Spice AK93-Acura	9	(United States) Chris Smith	1
(United States) Brix Racing	Spice AK93-Acura	9	(Canada) Jeremy Dale	3
(United States) Brix Racing	Spice AK93-Acura	9	(United States) Price Cobb	11
(United States) John Macaluso	Tiga GT286-Buick	10	(United States) John Macaluso	1, 5
(United States) John Macaluso	Tiga GT286-Buick	10	(Canada) Ed De Long	1, 4, 6–7, 9
(United States) John Macaluso	Tiga GT286-Buick	10	(Canada) Nick Holmes	1, 7
(United States) John Macaluso	Tiga GT286-Buick	10	(United States) Bruce MacInnes	1, 5
(United States) John Macaluso	Tiga GT286-Buick	10	(United States) Chris Ivey	4
(United States) John Macaluso	Tiga GT286-Buick	10	(Canada) Neil Jamieson	9-11
(United States) John Macaluso	Tiga GT286-Buick	10	(Canada) Jeff Lapcevich	10-11
(United States) John Macaluso	Tiga GT286-Buick	10	(United States) Bobby Brown	6
(United States) Bobby Brown Racing	Tiga GT286-Buick	11	(United States) Bobby Brown	4, 6
(United States) Bobby Brown Racing	Tiga GT286-Buick	11	(Canada) Ed De Long	4, 6
(United States) Bobby Brown Racing	Tiga GT286-Buick	16	(United States) Bobby Brown	7-8
(United States) Bobby Brown Racing	Tiga GT286-Buick	16	(United States) John Macaluso	7-8
(United States) Downing/Atlanta	Kudzu DG-1-Mazda	13	(United States) Jim Pace	7-9
(United States) Downing/Atlanta	Kudzu DG-1-Mazda	13	(United States) Mike Sheehan	7-11
(United States) Downing/Atlanta	Kudzu DG-1-Mazda	13	(United States) Butch Hamlet	9-11
(United States) Downing/Atlanta	Kudzu DG-1-Mazda	13	(United States) Michael Dow	11
(United States) Downing/Atlanta	Kudzu DG-2-Buick	63	(United States) Jim Downing	2, 4-7
(United States) Downing/Atlanta	Kudzu DG-2-Buick	63	(United States) Tim McAdam	2, 4-7
(United States) Downing/Atlanta	Kudzu DG-3-Mazda	63	(United States) Jim Downing	8-11
(United States) Downing/Atlanta	Kudzu DG-3-Mazda	63	(United States) Tim McAdam	8-11
(United States) Downing/Atlanta	Kudzu DG-1-Mazda	63	(United States) Jim Downing	3
(United States) Downing/Atlanta	Kudzu DG-1-Mazda	63	(United States) Tim McAdam	3
(United States) Downing/Atlanta	Kudzu DG-1-Mazda	63	(United States) Howard Katz	3
(United States) Downing/Atlanta	Kudzu DG-1-Mazda	68	(United States) Jim Pace	4-6
(United States) Downing/Atlanta	Kudzu DG-1-Mazda	68	(United States) Mike Sheehan	4-5
(United States) Downing/Atlanta	Kudzu DG-1-Mazda	68	(United States) Ken Parschauer	6
(United States) Erie Scientific Company	Kudzu DG-1-Mazda	36	(United States) John Grooms	1
(United States) Erie Scientific Company	Kudzu DG-1-Mazda	36	(United States) Frank Jellinek	1
(United States) Erie Scientific Company	Kudzu DG-1-Mazda	36	(United States) Jim Downing	1
(United States) Erie Scientific Company	Kudzu DG-1-Mazda	36	(United States) Tim McAdam	1
(Canada) Bieri Racing	Alba AR2/6-Ford	40	(Canada) Neil Jamieson	1, 3–4, 6-7
(Canada) Bieri Racing	Alba AR2/6-Ford	40	(Canada) Jeff Lapcevich	1, 3, 5-6
(Canada) Bieri Racing	Alba AR2/6-Ford	40	(Canada) John Jones	1, 3–5, 7
(Canada) Bieri Racing	Alba AR2/6-Ford	40	(Canada) Ken Wilden	1
(Canada) Bieri Racing	Alba AR2/6-Ford	40	(United States) Paul Duckworth	1
(Canada) Bieri Racing	Alba AR2/6-Ford	40	(Switzerland) Heinz Wirth	1
(Canada) Bieri Racing	Alba AR2/6-Ford	40	(Canada) Uli Bieri	3
(United States) Pro-Technik Racing	Fabcar CL-Porsche	42	(United States) Anthony Lazzaro	1, 3-4
(United States) Pro-Technik Racing	Fabcar CL-Porsche	42	(United States) Sam Shalala	1, 3-4
(United States) Pro-Technik Racing	Fabcar CL-Porsche	42	(United States) Buddy Lazier	1
(United States) Pro-Technik Racing	Fabcar CL-Porsche	42	(United States) Mike Sheehan	1, 3
(United States) Pro-Technik Racing	Fabcar CL-Porsche	42	(United States) Chris Ivey	1
(United States) Pro-Technik Racing	Fabcar CL-Porsche	42	(Switzerland) Philippe Favre	3
(United States) Pro-Technik Racing	Fabcar CL-Porsche	42	(Germany) Gustl Spreng	3
(United States) Pro-Technik Racing	Fabcar CL-Porsche	42	(Canada) Charles Monk	6
(United States) Pro-Technik Racing	Fabcar CL-Porsche	42	(United States) John Higgins	6
(United States) Scandia Engineering	Kudzu DG-2-Buick	44	(United States) Andy Evans	1-2
(United States) Scandia Engineering	Kudzu DG-2-Buick	44	(Spain) Fermín Vélez	1-2
(United States) Scandia Engineering	Kudzu DG-2-Buick	44	(United States) Charles Morgan	1-2
(United States) Scandia Engineering	Kudzu DG-2-Buick	44	(United States) Lou Bender	1
(United States) Scandia Engineering	Kudzu DG-2-Buick	45	(Spain) Fermín Vélez	1-2
(United States) Scandia Engineering	Kudzu DG-2-Buick	45	(United States) John Marconi	1
(United States) Scandia Engineering	Kudzu DG-2-Buick	45	(United States) Tom Hessert	1
(United States) Scandia Engineering	Kudzu DG-2-Buick	45	(United States) Don Bell	1
(United States) Scandia Engineering	Kudzu DG-2-Buick	45	(United States) Andy Evans	2
(United States) Comptech Racing	Spice SE90P-Acura	48	(Italy) Ruggero Melgrati	11
(United States) Comptech Racing	Spice SE90P-Acura	48	(United States) Parker Johnstone	11
(United States) Comptech Racing	Spice SE91P-Acura	49	(United States) Parker Johnstone	All
(United States) Comptech Racing	Spice SE91P-Acura	49	(United States) Dan Marvin	1, 3-11
(United States) Comptech Racing	Spice SE91P-Acura	49	(United States) Steve Cameron	1
(United States) Comptech Racing	Spice SE91P-Acura	49	(United States) Doug Peterson	1
(United States) Comptech Racing	Spice SE91P-Acura	49	(Italy) Ruggero Melgrati	2-3
(United States) Club Zed Motorsports	Tiga GT286-Mazda	71	(United States) Peter Harholdt	1
(United States) Club Zed Motorsports	Tiga GT286-Mazda	71	(United States) John Mirro	1
(United States) Club Zed Motorsports	Tiga GT286-Mazda	71	(Canada) Rob Mingay	1
(United States) Club Zed Motorsports	Tiga GT286-Mazda	71	(Canada) Ross Bentley	1
(United States) Club Zed Motorsports	Tiga GT286-Mazda	71	(United States) Joseph Hamilton	1
(Canada) Miroslav Jonak	Spice SE87C-Ford	71	(Canada) Miroslav Jonak	5, 7-11
(Canada) Miroslav Jonak	Spice SE87C-Ford	71	(United States) Dick Sasser	9-11

==== WSC ====
World Sports Cars were classified with GTP cars in the final standings, but were run as a separate class in sprint races.

Team	Car	No.	Drivers	Rounds
(United States) Huffaker Racing	Kudzu DG-2-Buick	12	(United States) David Rocha	11
private entrant	Mantac-Chevrolet	18	(United States) Cass Whitehead	8, 10
(United States) Performance Tech Motorsports	Argo JM19-Buick	25	(United States) Brent O'Neill	2, 6-7
(Canada) Bieri Racing	Alba AR2/6-Ford	40	(Spain) Fermín Vélez	11
(Canada) Bieri Racing	Alba AR2/6-Ford	40	(Switzerland) Heinz Wirth	11
(United States) Scandia Engineering	Kudzu DG-2-Buick	43	(United States) Andy Evans	2, 4, 7–8, 10-11
(United States) Scandia Engineering	Kudzu DG-2-Buick	43	(France) François Migault	2, 4–5, 7, 9-10
(United States) Scandia Engineering	Kudzu DG-2-Buick	43	(United States) Tom Hessert	9
(United States) Scandia Engineering	Kudzu DG-2-Buick	43	(Spain) Fermín Vélez	11
(United States) Pegasus Racing	Pegasus WSC-BMW	46	(Germany) Oliver Kuttner	8-10
(United States) Pegasus Racing	Pegasus WSC-BMW	48	(Germany) Oliver Kuttner	6
(United States) Downing/Atlanta	Kudzu DG-2-Buick	68	(United States) Jim Pace	11
(United States) Downing/Atlanta	Kudzu DG-2-Buick	68	(United States) Butch Hamlet	11
(United States) James Lee	Shelby LR93-Dodge	93	(United States) Cliff Rassweiler	10

==== Le Mans Cars ====
Non-GTP prototypes raced at the 24 Hours of Daytona under this class.

Team	Car	No.	Drivers	Rounds
(United Kingdom) Jaguar Racing	Jaguar XJR-12D	2	(United States) Davy Jones	1
(United Kingdom) Jaguar Racing	Jaguar XJR-12D	2	(United States) Scott Pruett	1
(United Kingdom) Jaguar Racing	Jaguar XJR-12D	2	(Canada) Scott Goodyear	1
(United Kingdom) Jaguar Racing	Jaguar XJR-12D	3	(Australia) David Brabham	1
(United Kingdom) Jaguar Racing	Jaguar XJR-12D	3	(United States) Mario Andretti	1
(United Kingdom) Jaguar Racing	Jaguar XJR-12D	3	(Denmark) John Nielsen	1
(United Kingdom) Jaguar Racing	Jaguar XJR-12D	32	(Denmark) John Nielsen	1
(United Kingdom) Jaguar Racing	Jaguar XJR-12D	32	(Australia) David Brabham	1
(United Kingdom) Jaguar Racing	Jaguar XJR-12D	32	(United States) Davy Jones	1
(United Kingdom) Jaguar Racing	Jaguar XJR-12D	32	(United States) John Andretti	1

=== GT ===
==== GTS ====
GTO cars ran as part of the GTS class in endurance races.

Team	Car	No.	Drivers	Rounds
(United States) Rocketsports Racing	Oldsmobile Cutlass	0	(United States) Scott Pruett	8-10
(United States) Rocketsports Racing	Oldsmobile Cutlass	3	(United States) Paul Gentilozzi	2, 6-11
(United States) Rocketsports Racing	Oldsmobile Cutlass	5	(United States) Darin Brassfield	2, 6-11
(United States) Rocketsports Racing	Oldsmobile Cutlass	31	(United States) Dorsey Schroeder	1, 3
(United States) Rocketsports Racing	Oldsmobile Cutlass	31	(United States) Paul Gentilozzi	1, 3
(United States) Rocketsports Racing	Oldsmobile Cutlass	31	(United States) Jack Baldwin	1
(United States) Rocketsports Racing	Oldsmobile Cutlass	31	(United States) Calvin Fish	1, 3
(United States) Rocketsports Racing	Oldsmobile Cutlass	31	(United States) Darin Brassfield	3
(United States) Rocketsports Racing	Oldsmobile Cutlass	31	(United States) George Robinson	1
(United States) Rocketsports Racing	Oldsmobile Cutlass	51	(United States) George Robinson	1
(United States) Rocketsports Racing	Oldsmobile Cutlass	51	(United States) Calvin Fish	1, 3
(United States) Rocketsports Racing	Oldsmobile Cutlass	51	(United States) Darin Brassfield	1, 3
(United States) Rocketsports Racing	Oldsmobile Cutlass	51	(United States) Scott Pruett	3
(United States) Rocketsports Racing	Oldsmobile Cutlass	51	(United States) Jack Baldwin	1
(United States) Rocketsports Racing	Oldsmobile Cutlass	51	(United States) Dorsey Schroeder	1
(United States) Rocketsports Racing	Oldsmobile Cutlass	51	(United States) Paul Gentilozzi	1, 3
(United States) Don Arpin	Chevrolet Camaro	07	(United States) Don Arpin	1
(United States) Don Arpin	Chevrolet Camaro	07	(United States) Tim Banks	1
(United States) Don Arpin	Chevrolet Camaro	07	(United States) Paul Reckert	1
(United States) Don Arpin	Chevrolet Camaro	07	(United States) Guy Church	1
(United States) Don Arpin	Chevrolet Camaro	07	(United States) David Kicak	1
(United States) Cunningham Racing	Nissan 300ZX Turbo	1	(New Zealand) Steve Millen	1-3, 6-7
(United States) Cunningham Racing	Nissan 300ZX Turbo	1	(United States) Johnny O'Connell	1, 3
(United States) Cunningham Racing	Nissan 300ZX Turbo	1	(United States) John Morton	1, 3
(United States) Cunningham Racing	Nissan 300ZX Turbo	76	(United States) John Morton	3
(United States) Cunningham Racing	Nissan 300ZX Turbo	76	(United States) Johnny O'Connell	All
(United States) Cunningham Racing	Nissan 300ZX Turbo	76	(Australia) Geoff Brabham	1
(United States) Cunningham Racing	Nissan 300ZX Turbo	76	(United States) David Loring	1
(United States) Cunningham Racing	Nissan 300ZX Turbo	76	(United States) Tommy Riggins	1, 3
(United States) Cunningham Racing	Nissan 300ZX Turbo	76	(United States) Dominic Dobson	1, 3
(United States) Cunningham Racing	Nissan 300ZX Turbo	76	(New Zealand) Steve Millen	1, 3
(United States) Eddie Sharp	Oldsmobile Cutlass	2	(United States) Eddie Sharp	3
(United States) Eddie Sharp	Oldsmobile Cutlass	2	(United States) Dick Downs	3
(United States) Eddie Sharp	Oldsmobile Cutlass	2	(United States) Eddie Sharp Jr.	3
(United States) Bruce Trenery	Chevrolet Camaro	2	(United States) Bruce Trenery	7
(United States) Bruce Trenery	Chevrolet Camaro	2	(United States) Kent Painter	7-8
(United States) Bruce Trenery	Chevrolet Camaro	21	(United States) Bruce Trenery	1, 3
(United States) Bruce Trenery	Chevrolet Camaro	21	(United States) Kent Painter	1, 3
(United States) Bruce Trenery	Chevrolet Camaro	21	(Australia) Andrew Osman	1, 3
(United States) Bruce Trenery	Chevrolet Camaro	21	(United States) Larry Less	1
(United States) Bruce Trenery	Chevrolet Camaro	21	(United States) Robert Borders	1
(United States) Bruce Trenery	Chevrolet Camaro	21	(United States) Scott Gaylord	1
(United States) Roush Racing	Ford Mustang Cobra	6	(United States) Tommy Kendall	2, 6, 8-11
(United States) Roush Racing	Ford Mustang Cobra	11	(United States) Tommy Kendall	1, 3
(United States) Roush Racing	Ford Mustang Cobra	11	(United States) Robby Gordon	1
(United States) Roush Racing	Ford Mustang Cobra	11	(United States) Wally Dallenbach Jr.	1, 3
(United States) Roush Racing	Ford Mustang Cobra	11	(United States) Robbie Buhl	1
(United States) Roush Racing	Ford Mustang Cobra	11	(United States) John Fergus	3
(United States) Roush Racing	Ford Mustang Cobra	11	(United States) Max Jones	3
(United States) Roush Racing	Ford Mustang Cobra	11	(United States) Dan Binks	3
(United States) Roush Racing	Ford Mustang Cobra	11	(United States) Jim Stevens	1
(United States) Roush Racing	Ford Mustang Cobra	15	(United States) Jim Stevens	1
(United States) Roush Racing	Ford Mustang Cobra	15	(United States) John Fergus	1
(United States) Roush Racing	Ford Mustang Cobra	15	(United States) Mark Martin	1
(United States) Roush Racing	Ford Mustang Cobra	15	(United States) Tommy Kendall	7
(United States) Roush Racing	Ford Mustang Cobra	17	(United States) Jon Gooding	1
(United States) Roush Racing	Ford Mustang Cobra	17	(United States) Joe Pezza	1
(United States) Roush Racing	Ford Mustang Cobra	17	(United States) Bill Cooper	1
private entrant	Porsche 930 S	10	(Canada) Charly Godecke	9-10
(United States) Lotusport	Lotus Esprit X180R	14	(United States) David Murry	11
(United States) Lotusport	Lotus Esprit X180R	14	(United States) Andy Pilgrim	11
(United States) Lotusport	Lotus Esprit X180R	14	(United States) Bo Lemler	11
(United States) Tom Gloy Racing	Ford Mustang	18	(Canada) Ron Fellows	1
(United States) Tom Gloy Racing	Ford Mustang	18	(South Africa) Desiré Wilson	1
(United States) Tom Gloy Racing	Ford Mustang	18	(Japan) Tomiko Yoshikawa	1
(United States) Tom Gloy Racing	Ford Mustang	18	(Canada) Pieter Baljet	1
(United States) Tom Gloy Racing	Ford Mustang	18	(United States) Tom Gloy	1
(United States) Anthony Puleo	Chevrolet Camaro	19	(United States) Anthony Puleo	1
(United States) Anthony Puleo	Chevrolet Camaro	19	(United States) William Wessel	1
(United States) Anthony Puleo	Chevrolet Camaro	19	(United States) David Fuller	1
(United States) Anthony Puleo	Chevrolet Camaro	19	(United States) Tim O'Brien	1
(United States) John Josey	Chevrolet Camaro	22	(United States) John Josey	1
(United States) John Josey	Chevrolet Camaro	22	(United States) Craig Rubright	1
(United States) John Josey	Chevrolet Camaro	22	(United States) Daniel Urrutia	1, 3
(United States) John Josey	Chevrolet Camaro	22	(United States) Gene Whipp	1, 3
(United States) John Josey	Chevrolet Camaro	22	(United States) Luis Sereix	3
(United States) Dale Kreider Team Argentina	Oldsmobile Cutlass	23	(Argentina) Oscar Aventín	1
(United States) Dale Kreider Team Argentina	Oldsmobile Cutlass	23	(Argentina) Juan Landa	1
(United States) Dale Kreider Team Argentina	Oldsmobile Cutlass	23	(Argentina) Osvaldo Morresi	1
(United States) Dale Kreider Team Argentina	Oldsmobile Cutlass	23	(Argentina) Osvaldo López	1
(United States) Dale Kreider Team Argentina	Oldsmobile Cutlass	23	(Argentina) Hugo Mazzacane	1
(United States) Dale Kreider Team Argentina	Oldsmobile Cutlass	25	(Argentina) Hugo Mazzacane	1
(United States) Dale Kreider Team Argentina	Oldsmobile Cutlass	25	(Argentina) Emilio Satriano	1
(United States) Dale Kreider Team Argentina	Oldsmobile Cutlass	25	(Argentina) Jorge Oyhanart	1
(United States) Dale Kreider Team Argentina	Oldsmobile Cutlass	25	(Argentina) Fabian Acuna	1
(United States) Carolina Racing Engines	Pontiac Grand Prix	32	(United States) Gary Smith	3
(United States) Carolina Racing Engines	Pontiac Grand Prix	32	(United States) Mark Kennedy	3
(United States) Carolina Racing Engines	Pontiac Grand Prix	32	(United States) Robert Borders	3
(United States) Carolina Racing Engines	Pontiac Grand Prix	32	(United States) Paul Reckert	3
(United States) Fuller Race Cars Inc.	Chevrolet Camaro	32	(United States) Bill Fuller	8
(United States) Bill McDill	Chevrolet Camaro	35	(United States) Bill McDill	1, 3
(United States) Bill McDill	Chevrolet Camaro	35	(United States) Richard McDill	1, 3
(United States) Bill McDill	Chevrolet Camaro	35	(United States) Tom Juckette	1, 3
(Puerto Rico) Falgueras/Abreu	Oldsmobile Cutlass	45	(Puerto Rico) Rolando Falgueras	2
(Puerto Rico) Falgueras/Abreu	Oldsmobile Cutlass	45	(Dominican Republic) Adriano Abreu	2
(United States) Overbagh Racing	Chevrolet Camaro	50	(United States) Hoyt Overbagh	1, 3
(United States) Overbagh Racing	Chevrolet Camaro	50	(United States) Oma Kimbrough	1, 3, 7
(United States) Overbagh Racing	Chevrolet Camaro	50	(United States) Bob Hundredmark	1, 3
(United States) Overbagh Racing	Chevrolet Camaro	50	(United States) Robert McElheny	1, 3
(United States) Overbagh Racing	Chevrolet Camaro	50	(United States) Mark Montgomery	1, 3
(United States) Overbagh Racing	Chevrolet Camaro	50	(United States) David Kicak	1, 7
private entrant	Chevrolet Corvette	51	(United States) Javier Garcia	2
private entrant	Chevrolet Corvette	62	(United States) Dan Furey	6
(Argentina) Kendall Oil Company	Chevrolet Camaro	67	(Argentina) Paul Mazzacane	1-3
(Argentina) Kendall Oil Company	Chevrolet Camaro	67	(United States) Chester Edwards	1, 3
(Argentina) Kendall Oil Company	Chevrolet Camaro	67	(United States) Peter Argetsinger	3
(Argentina) Kendall Oil Company	Chevrolet Camaro	67	(United States) Kenny Wallace	1
private entrant	Pontiac Firebird	77	(United States) R.J. Gottlieb	9
(United States) Mark Kennedy	Chevrolet Camaro	81	(United States) Mark Kennedy	1
(United States) Mark Kennedy	Chevrolet Camaro	81	(United States) Hugh Fuller	1
(United States) Mark Kennedy	Chevrolet Camaro	81	(United States) Jeff Purvis	1
(United States) Mark Kennedy	Chevrolet Camaro	81	(United States) Jeff Swindel	1
(United States) Mark Kennedy	Chevrolet Camaro	81	(United States) Mike Joy	1
(United States) Mark Kennedy	Chevrolet Camaro	81	(United States) Bob Soccha	1
(United States) Tommy Riggins	Chevrolet Corvette	86	(United States) Tommy Riggins	2
(United States) John Annis Racing	Chevrolet Camaro	87	(United States) John Annis	1, 3
(United States) John Annis Racing	Chevrolet Camaro	87	(United States) Louis Beall	1, 3
(United States) John Annis Racing	Chevrolet Camaro	87	(United States) Dick Downs	1
(United States) John Annis Racing	Chevrolet Camaro	87	(United States) Robert Kirkland	1
(United States) John Annis Racing	Chevrolet Camaro	87	(United States) Bob Deeks	1
(United States) John Annis Racing	Chevrolet Camaro	87	(United States) Eddie Sharp	1
(United States) John Annis Racing	Chevrolet Camaro	87	(United States) Kenper Miller	3
(United States) Road Circuit Technology	Pontiac Firebird	90	(United States) Andy Petery	1, 3
(United States) Road Circuit Technology	Pontiac Firebird	90	(United States) Les Delano	1
(United States) Road Circuit Technology	Pontiac Firebird	90	(United States) Steve Fossett	1
(United States) Road Circuit Technology	Pontiac Firebird	90	(United States) Gary Stewart	1
(United States) Road Circuit Technology	Pontiac Firebird	90	(United States) Thomas Schweitz	1, 3
(United States) Road Circuit Technology	Pontiac Firebird	90	(United States) John Macaluso	3
(United States) Oest Enterprises Racing	Porsche 930 Turbo	93	(United States) Milt Minter	9, 11

==== GTO ====
GTO cars only raced as a separate class at sprint races.

Team	Car	No.	Drivers	Rounds
(United States) Rocketsports Racing	Oldsmobile Cutlass	00	(United States) Brian DeVries	6-11
private entrant	Chevrolet Camaro	06	(United States) Vincent Musicaro	2
private entrant	Chevrolet Camaro	7	(United States) Deborah Gregg	2
private entrant	Oldsmobile Cutlass	10	(United States) Robert Borders	2
(United States) Competition Motorsport South	Chevrolet Camaro	10	(United States) Ken Bupp	6
(United States) Competition Motorsport South	Chevrolet Camaro	11	(United States) Ken Bupp	2, 7-11
(United States) Competition Motorsport South	Chevrolet Camaro	11	(United States) Peter Uria	7
(United States) Tommy Riggins	Oldsmobile Cutlass	12	(United States) Joe Llauget	2, 6-11
private entrant	Pontiac Firebird	13	(United States) Rick Katko	6
(United States) Roush Racing (United States) General Chemical	Ford Mustang	14	(United States) Michael Dingman	2
private entrant	Chevrolet Camaro	16	(United States) Carlos Lopez	2
(United States) Garfield's Auto	Oldsmobile Cutlass	17	(United States) Joe Pezza	6-11
(United States) Garfield's Auto	Oldsmobile Cutlass	17	(United States) Michael Zimicki	7
(United States) Garfield's Auto	Oldsmobile Cutlass	53	(United States) Joe Pezza	2
private entrant	Ford Mustang	18	(United States) Lito Riano	2
private entrant	Chevrolet Camaro	18	(United States) Mitchell Bender	6
(United States) Dan Osterholt	Oldsmobile Cutlass	20	(United States) Dan Osterholt	2, 6-8
(United States) Dan Osterholt	Oldsmobile Cutlass	20	(United States) Clay Young	7
(United States) Briody Racing	Oldsmobile Calais	24	(United States) Jim Briody	2
(United States) Curren Motorsports	Oldsmobile Cutlass	27	(United States) Tom Curren	2
(United States) Wayne Akers Ford	Ford Mustang	28	(United States) Wayne Akers	2
private entrant	Pontiac Firebird	28	(United States) Rob Davis	9
(United States) Fuller Race Cars Inc.	Chevrolet Camaro	30	(United States) Nick Cole	2, 6, 8, 11
(United States) Fuller Race Cars Inc.	Chevrolet Camaro	30	(United States) Bill Fuller	11
(United States) Fuller Race Cars Inc.	Chevrolet Camaro	31	(United States) Nick Cole	7, 11
(United States) Fuller Race Cars Inc.	Buick Somerset	31	(United States) Bill Fuller	2
(United States) Fuller Race Cars Inc.	Chevrolet Camaro	31	(United States) Bill Fuller	6, 11
(United States) Carolina Racing Engines	Pontiac Grand Prix	32	(United States) Gary Smith	2
private entrant	Chevrolet Camaro	38	(United States) Trent Terry	6
(Puerto Rico) Falgueras/Abreu	Oldsmobile Cutlass	46	(Puerto Rico) Rolando Falgueras	2
(Puerto Rico) Falgueras/Abreu	Oldsmobile Cutlass	46	(Dominican Republic) Adriano Abreu	2
private entrant	Oldsmobile Cutlass	47	(United States) Charles Morgan	6-11
(United States) Lindley Racing	Ford Mustang	48	(United States) Les Lindley	2, 6-11
private entrant	Ford Thunderbird	49	(United States) Robert Rose	6
private entrant	Oldsmobile Cutlass	51	(United States) Mark Porcaro	6-8
private entrant	Oldsmobile Cutlass	68	(Dominican Republic) Luis Méndez	2
private entrant	Oldsmobile Toronado	70	(United States) Bob Lee	2
(United States) Mollett Racing	Ford Mustang	74	(United States) Casey Mollett	2, 11
(United States) Bobby Basso	Oldsmobile Calais	80	(United States) Bobby Basso	7
(United States) Bobby Basso	Oldsmobile Calais	80	(United States) Phil Kelly	7
private entrant	Chevrolet Camaro	85	(United States) Chip Boatright	6
private entrant	Chevrolet Camaro	87	(United States) Steve Hodge	10
(United States) Groggins Plastics	Oldsmobile Cutlass	88	(United States) Flip Groggins	2, 7
private entrant	Chevrolet Camaro	90	(United States) Jim Maguire	11
private entrant	Buick Somerset	91	(United States) Lance Leonelli	2, 6, 11
(United States) Kendall Racing	Ford Mustang	96	(United States) Chuck Kendall	9
(United States) Performance Plus	Chevrolet Camaro	99	(United States) Mark Pielsticker	9-10

==== GTU ====
Team	Car	No.	Drivers	Rounds
(Ecuador) Henry Taleb Racing	Nissan 300ZX	08	(Ecuador) Henry Taleb	1-2
(Ecuador) Henry Taleb Racing	Nissan 300ZX	08	(Ecuador) Alfonso Adarquea	1
(Ecuador) Henry Taleb Racing	Nissan 300ZX	08	(Ecuador) Marcelo Adarquea	1
(Ecuador) Henry Taleb Racing	Nissan 300ZX	08	(Ecuador) Ignacia Escobar	1
private entrant	Pontiac Fiero	09	(Dominican Republic) Luis M. Méndez	2
(United States) Support Net Racing	Mazda MX-6	4	(United States) Henry Camferdam	7-8, 11
(United States) Support Net Racing	Mazda MX-6	9	(United States) Henry Camferdam	6
(United States) Support Net Racing	Mazda MX-6	12	(United States) Henry Camferdam	1
(United States) Support Net Racing	Mazda MX-6	12	(United States) Dan Robson	1
(United States) Support Net Racing	Mazda MX-6	12	(United States) Gary Drummond	1
private entrant	Mazda RX-7	11	(United States) Steve Clark	6
private entrant	Porsche 911	14	(United States) Mat Lowrance	9
private entrant	Mazda RX-7	15	(Dominican Republic) Eduardo Pellerano	6, 8
(United States) Auberlen Racing Concepts	Mazda RX-7	19	(United States) Bill Auberlen	2, 6-11
Dibos Racing Team Peru	Mazda MX-6	24	(Peru) Juan Dibós	1, 3
Dibos Racing Team Peru	Mazda MX-6	24	(Peru) Eduardo Dibós	1, 3
Dibos Racing Team Peru	Mazda MX-6	24	(Peru) Raúl Orlandini	1
Dibos Racing Team Peru	Mazda MX-6	24	(United States) Roger Mandeville	1
Dibos Racing Team Peru	Mazda MX-6	24	(United States) Bill Auberlen	3
Dibos Racing Team Peru	Mazda MX-6	84	(Peru) Eduardo Dibós	2, 6
Dibos Racing Team Peru	Mazda RX-7	84	(Peru) Eduardo Dibós	7-11
(United States) Alex Job Racing	Porsche 911	26	(United States) Charles Slater	1, 3, 6–8, 11
(United States) Alex Job Racing	Porsche 911	26	(United States) Butch Hamlet	1, 3
(United States) Alex Job Racing	Porsche 911	26	(United States) Mark Sandridge	1
(United States) Alex Job Racing	Porsche 911	26	(United States) Bill Ferran	3, 7
(United States) Alex Job Racing	Porsche 911	26	(United States) Peter Uria	8
(United States) Charles Wagner	Mazda RX-7	39	(United States) Bill Auberlen	1
(United States) Charles Wagner	Mazda RX-7	39	(United States) Dave Russell	1
(United States) Charles Wagner	Mazda RX-7	39	(United States) Charles Wagner	1
(United States) Charles Wagner	Mazda RX-7	39	(United States) Mike Graham	1
(United States) Richardson Racing	Lotus Esprit	40	(United States) Tim Richardson	11
(United States) Kryderacing	Nissan 240SX	57	(United States) Reed Kryder	1-3, 6–8, 11
(United States) Kryderacing	Nissan 240SX	57	(United States) Frank Del Vecchio	1, 3
(United States) Kryderacing	Nissan 240SX	57	(France) Guy Kuster	1, 3, 8
(United States) Kryderacing	Nissan 240SX	57	(United States) Joe Danaher	1
private entrant	Porsche 911	57	(United States) Monte Shelton	10
(United States) Pro-Technik Racing	Porsche 911	58	(United States) Sam Shalala	1, 6
(United States) Pro-Technik Racing	Porsche 911	58	(United States) Anthony Lazzaro	1
(United States) Pro-Technik Racing	Porsche 911	58	(United States) Frank Beard	1, 3
(United States) Pro-Technik Racing	Porsche 911	58	(United States) Alex Tradd	1
(United States) Pro-Technik Racing	Porsche 911	58	(United States) Andre Toennis	1
(United States) Pro-Technik Racing	Porsche 911	58	(Switzerland) Omar Daniel	1
(United States) Pro-Technik Racing	Porsche 911	58	(United States) Curt Catallo	3
(United States) Pro-Technik Racing	Porsche 911	58	(United States) Haas Fogle	3
(United States) Pro-Technik Racing	Porsche 911	58	(Canada) Ernie Lader	3
(United States) Pro-Technik Racing	Porsche 911	58	(United States) Bill Ferran	6
private entrant	Nissan 240SX	66	(United States) John Goddard	9-10
(United States) Kenneth Brady	Mazda MX-6	70	(United States) Kenneth Brady	3
(United States) Kenneth Brady	Mazda MX-6	70	(United States) Bill Weston	3
(United States) Kenneth Brady	Mazda MX-6	70	(United States) Dom DeLuca	3
(United States) Jay Kjoller	Porsche 911	72	(United States) Jay Kjoller	7-8
(United States) Jay Kjoller	Porsche 911	72	(United States) Joe Cogbill	7-8
(United States) Jay Kjoller	Porsche 911	72	(United States) James O'Connell	6
(United States) Jack Lewis Enterprises	Porsche 964 Carrera RSR	73	(United States) Jack Lewis	1, 6-8
(United States) Jack Lewis Enterprises	Porsche 964 Carrera RSR	73	(United States) Joe Cogbill	1
(United States) Jack Lewis Enterprises	Porsche 964 Carrera RSR	73	(United States) Stephen Hynes	1, 7
(United States) Jack Lewis Enterprises	Porsche 964 Carrera RSR	73	(United States) Bob Barker	1
(United States) Jack Lewis Enterprises	Porsche 964 Carrera RSR	73	(United States) Bill Ferran	8
(United States) Dick Greer Racing (United States) Wendy's Race Team	Mazda RX-7	82	(United States) Dick Greer	All
(United States) Dick Greer Racing (United States) Wendy's Race Team	Mazda RX-7	82	(United States) Al Bacon	1, 3
(United States) Dick Greer Racing (United States) Wendy's Race Team	Mazda RX-7	82	(United States) Peter Uria	1, 3
(United States) Dick Greer Racing (United States) Wendy's Race Team	Mazda RX-7	82	(United States) Mike Mees	1, 3
private entrant	Porsche 911	85	(Dominican Republic) Tony Canahuate	2
(United States) Dynamic Air Conditioning	Porsche 911	89	(United States) Bruce Jones	6
(United States) Dynamic Air Conditioning	Porsche 911	89	(United States) Ray Hendricks	7
(United States) Team Casual Motorsport	Porsche 911	91	(United States) Mel Butt	3
(United States) Team Casual Motorsport	Porsche 911	91	(United States) Ron Zitza	3
(United States) Team Casual Motorsport	Porsche 911	91	(United States) Tommy Johnson	3
(United States) Team Casual Motorsport	Porsche 911	91	(United States) C. Lorin Hicks	3
(United States) Oest Enterprises Racing	Porsche 911 Carrera RSR	92	(United States) Dieter Oest	9
(United States) Leitzinger Racing	Nissan 240SX	95	(United States) Bob Leitzinger	All
(United States) Leitzinger Racing	Nissan 240SX	95	(United States) Butch Leitzinger	1, 3
(United States) Leitzinger Racing	Nissan 240SX	95	(United States) Chuck Kurtz	1
(United States) Leitzinger Racing	Nissan 240SX	95	(United States) Don Knowles	3
(United States) Leitzinger Racing	Nissan 240SX	97	(United States) Butch Leitzinger	2, 6-11

==== Invitational GT ====
Production-based GT cars were allowed to compete in endurance races and selected sprint races as part of this class, not scoring championship points.

Team	Car	No.	Drivers	Rounds
(United States) Ed Arnold Racing	BMW M5	0	(United States) David Donohue	3
(United States) Ed Arnold Racing	BMW M5	0	(Austria) Dieter Quester	3
(United States) Ed Arnold Racing	BMW M5	0	(United Kingdom) Chris Hodgetts	3
(United States) Ed Arnold Racing	BMW M5	0	(United States) Ed Arnold	3
(United States) Ed Arnold Racing	BMW M5	0	(Canada) Bill Adam	3
(United States) Rohr Engineering	Porsche 964 Carrera 2 Cup	01	(United States) Jochen Rohr	1, 3, 7
(United States) Rohr Engineering	Porsche 964 Carrera 2 Cup	01	(United States) John O'Steen	1, 3, 7
(United States) Rohr Engineering	Porsche 964 Carrera 2 Cup	01	(United States) Larry Schumacher	1
(United States) Rohr Engineering	Porsche 964 Carrera 2 Cup	01	(United States) Dave White	1, 3
(United States) Rohr Engineering	Porsche 964 Carrera 2 Cup	01	(United States) Nick Ham	1
(United States) Rohr Engineering	Porsche 964 Carrera 2 Cup	01	(United States) Rich Moskalik	1, 3
(United States) Mercruiser	Chevrolet Corvette	4, 5	(United States) Lou Gigliotti	1
(United States) Mercruiser	Chevrolet Corvette	4, 5	(United States) R.J. Valentine	1
(United States) Mercruiser	Chevrolet Corvette	4, 5	(United States) Max Schmidt	1
(United States) Mercruiser	Chevrolet Corvette	4, 5	(United States) Jim Minneker	1
(United States) Mercruiser	Chevrolet Corvette	4, 5	(United States) Ken Payson	1
(United States) Mercruiser	Chevrolet Corvette	4, 5	(United States) Kim Baker	1
(United States) Mercruiser	Chevrolet Corvette	4, 5	(United States) Shawn Hendricks	1
(United States) Mercruiser	Chevrolet Corvette	4, 5	(United States) Peter Cunningham	1
(United States) Mercruiser	Chevrolet Corvette	4, 5	(United States) Boris Said	1
(United States) Mercruiser	Chevrolet Corvette	5	(United States) Brian Bonner	1
(United States) Scott Clarke	Porsche 944 Turbo	15	(United States) Lance Stewart	3
(United States) Scott Clarke	Porsche 944 Turbo	15	(New Zealand) Rob Wilson	3
(United States) Scott Clarke	Porsche 944 Turbo	15	(United States) Leigh Miller	3
(United States) Scott Clarke	Porsche 944 Turbo	15	(United States) Ed Hubbard	3
(United States) Scott Clarke	Porsche 944 Turbo	15	(United States) Bernadette Hubbard	3
(United States) Scott Clarke	Porsche 944 Turbo	16	(United States) Bernadette Hubbard	3
(United States) Scott Clarke	Porsche 944 Turbo	16	(Canada) Ludwig Heimrath, Jr.	3
(United States) Scott Clarke	Porsche 944 Turbo	16	(United States) Leigh Miller	3
(United States) Scott Clarke	Porsche 944 Turbo	16	(United States) Ken McKinnon	3
(United States) Scott Clarke	Porsche 944 Turbo	16	(United States) Tom Rathbun	3
(United States) Scott Clarke	Porsche 944 Turbo	92	(Canada) Ludwig Heimrath, Jr.	1
(United States) Scott Clarke	Porsche 944 Turbo	92	(United States) Leigh Miller	1
(United States) Scott Clarke	Porsche 944 Turbo	92	(United States) Paul Reisman	1
(United States) Scott Clarke	Porsche 944 Turbo	92	(United States) Paul Lewis	1
(United States) Scott Clarke	Porsche 944 Turbo	92	(United States) John Reisman	1
(Germany) Porsche Club Hildesheim	Porsche 964 Carrera 2 Cup	27	(Germany) Edgar Dören	1
(Germany) Porsche Club Hildesheim	Porsche 964 Carrera 2 Cup	27	(Germany) Wolfgang Mathai	1
(Germany) Porsche Club Hildesheim	Porsche 964 Carrera 2 Cup	27	(Germany) Oliver Mathai	1
(Germany) Cigarette Racing	Porsche 964 Carrera 2 Cup	28	(Switzerland) Enzo Calderari	1, 3
(Germany) Cigarette Racing	Porsche 964 Carrera 2 Cup	28	(Switzerland) Sandro Angelastri	1
(Germany) Cigarette Racing	Porsche 964 Carrera 2 Cup	28	(Germany) Ronny Meixner	1, 3
(Germany) Cigarette Racing	Porsche 964 Carrera 2 Cup	28	(Italy) Luigino Pagotto	1, 3
(Germany) Bernt Motorsport	Porsche 964 Carrera 2 Cup	41	(Germany) Stig Amthor	1, 3
(Germany) Bernt Motorsport	Porsche 964 Carrera 2 Cup	41	(Germany) Andreas Fuchs	1, 3
(Germany) Bernt Motorsport	Porsche 964 Carrera 2 Cup	41	(Belgium) Philippe de Craene	1, 3
(Germany) Bernt Motorsport	Porsche 964 Carrera 2 Cup	41	(Italy) Alfio Marchini	1
(Germany) Bernt Motorsport	Porsche 964 Carrera 2 Cup	41	(Germany) Oliver Kuttner	1
(Canada) Antica A/B	Porsche 944 Turbo	45	(Canada) Vito Scavone	3, 7
(Canada) Antica A/B	Porsche 944 Turbo	45	(Canada) Rich Hayward	3
(Canada) Antica A/B	Porsche 944 Turbo	45	(Canada) Terry Martel	3
(Canada) Antica A/B	Porsche 944 Turbo	45	(Switzerland) Heinz Wirth	3
(United States) Champion Porsche	Porsche 964 Carrera 2 Cup	48	(United States) Danny Marshall	1
(United States) Champion Porsche	Porsche 964 Carrera 2 Cup	48	(United States) Weldon Scrogham	1
(United States) Champion Porsche	Porsche 964 Carrera 2 Cup	48	(United States) John Biggs	1
(United States) Champion Porsche	Porsche 964 Carrera 2 Cup	48	(Germany) Oliver Kuttner	1, 3
(United States) Champion Porsche	Porsche 964 Carrera 2 Cup	48	(United Kingdom) Justin Bell	3
(United States) Champion Porsche	Porsche 964 Carrera 2 Cup	48	(United States) Mike Peters	3
(United States) Brumos Porsche	Porsche 964 Turbo S LM	59	(United States) Hurley Haywood	3
(United States) Brumos Porsche	Porsche 964 Turbo S LM	59	(Germany) Walter Röhrl	3
(United States) Brumos Porsche	Porsche 964 Turbo S LM	59	(Germany) Hans-Joachim Stuck	3
(United States) Morrison Motorsports	Chevrolet Corvette ZR-1	93, 94	(United States) Andy Pilgrim	1, 3, 8
(United States) Morrison Motorsports	Chevrolet Corvette ZR-1	93, 94	(United States) John Heinricy	1, 3
(United States) Morrison Motorsports	Chevrolet Corvette ZR-1	93, 94	(United States) Stu Hayner	1, 3
(United States) Morrison Motorsports	Chevrolet Corvette ZR-1	93, 94	(United States) Del Percilla	1, 3
(United States) Morrison Motorsports	Chevrolet Corvette ZR-1	93, 94	(United States) Danny Kellermeyer	1
(United States) Morrison Motorsports	Chevrolet Corvette ZR-1	93, 94	(United States) Scott Allman	1
(United States) Morrison Motorsports	Chevrolet Corvette ZR-1	93, 94	(United States) Boris Said	3
(United States) Morrison Motorsports	Chevrolet Corvette ZR-1	93, 94	(United States) Jim Minneker	3
(United States) Morrison Motorsports	Chevrolet Corvette ZR-1	93, 94	(United States) Ron Nelson	3
(United States) Morrison Motorsports	Chevrolet Corvette ZR-1	93	(United States) Ron Nelson	1, 3
(United States) Morrison Motorsports	Chevrolet Corvette ZR-1	93	(United States) Don Knowles	3
(United States) Morrison Motorsports	Chevrolet Corvette ZR-1	93	(Germany) Ronny Meixner	3
(United States) Morrison Motorsports	Chevrolet Corvette ZR-1	93	(United States) Del Percilla	7
(United States) Morrison Motorsports	Chevrolet Corvette ZR-1	93	(United States) Jim Minneker	7-8
(United States) Morrison Motorsports	Chevrolet Corvette ZR-1	94	(United States) Don Knowles	1
(United States) Morrison Motorsports	Chevrolet Corvette ZR-1	94	(United States) Andy Pilgrim	7
(United States) Morrison Motorsports	Chevrolet Corvette ZR-1	94	(United States) John Heinricy	7

==== International GT ====
A class for ACO-spec GT cars was introduced for the Road America and Laguna Seca races, but no cars appeared at Laguna Seca.

Team	Car	No.	Drivers	Rounds
(United Kingdom) Jaguar Racing	Jaguar XJ220C TWR	99	(United States) Davy Jones	8
(United Kingdom) Jaguar Racing	Jaguar XJ220C TWR	99	(United States) Jay Cochran	8

== Race results ==
Rnd	Circuit	GTP/WSC Winning Team	GTP Lights Winning Team	GTS Winning Team	GTO Winning Team	GTU Winning Team
Rnd	Circuit	GTP/WSC Winning Driver(s)	GTP Lights Winning Driver(s)	GTS Winning Driver(s)	GTO Winning Driver(s)	GTU Winning Driver(s)
1	Daytona	(United States) #98 All American Racers	(United States) #36 Erie Scientific Company	(United States) #11 Roush Racing	did not participate	(United States) #82 Wendy's Race Team
1	Daytona	(United States) P. J. Jones (United States) Rocky Moran (United States) Mark Dismore	(United States) John Grooms (United States) Frank Jellinek (United States) Tim McAdam (United States) Jim Downing	(United States) Tommy Kendall (United States) Robby Gordon (United States) Wally Dallenbach Jr. (United States) Robbie Buhl	did not participate	(United States) Dick Greer (United States) Al Bacon (United States) Peter Uria (United States) Mike Mees
2	Miami	(United States) #99 All American Racers	(United States) #49 Comptech Racing	(United States) #3 Rocketsports Racing	(United States) #48 Lindley Racing	(United States) #97 Leitzinger Racing
2	Miami	(Argentina) Juan Manuel Fangio II	(United States) Parker Johnstone (Italy) Ruggero Melgrati	(United States) Paul Gentilozzi	(United States) Les Lindley	(United States) Butch Leitzinger
3	Sebring	(United States) #99 All American Racers	(United States) #49 Comptech Racing	(United States) #1 Cunningham Racing	did not participate	(United States) #82 Wendy's Race Team
3	Sebring	(Argentina) Juan Manuel Fangio II (United Kingdom) Andy Wallace	(United States) Parker Johnstone (United States) Dan Marvin (Italy) Ruggero Melgrati	(New Zealand) Steve Millen (United States) Johnny O'Connell (United States) John Morton	did not participate	(United States) Dick Greer (United States) Al Bacon (United States) Peter Uria (United States) Mike Mees
4	Atlanta	(United States) #99 All American Racers	(United States) #49 Comptech Racing	did not participate	did not participate	did not participate
4	Atlanta	(Argentina) Juan Manuel Fangio II	(United States) Parker Johnstone (United States) Dan Marvin	did not participate	did not participate	did not participate
5	Lime Rock	(United States) #99 All American Racers	(United States) #49 Comptech Racing	did not participate	did not participate	did not participate
5	Lime Rock	(Argentina) Juan Manuel Fangio II	(United States) Parker Johnstone (United States) Dan Marvin	did not participate	did not participate	did not participate
6	Mid-Ohio	(United States) #99 All American Racers	(United States) #49 Comptech Racing	(United States) #5 Rocketsports Racing	(United States) #47 Charles Morgan	(United States) #97 Leitzinger Racing
6	Mid-Ohio	(Argentina) Juan Manuel Fangio II	(United States) Parker Johnstone (United States) Dan Marvin	(United States) Darin Brassfield	(United States) Charles Morgan	(United States) Butch Leitzinger
7	Watkins Glen	(United States) #99 All American Racers	(United States) #9 Brix Racing	(United States) #5 Rocketsports Racing	(United States) #48 Lindley Racing	(United States) #97 Leitzinger Racing
7	Watkins Glen	(Argentina) Juan Manuel Fangio II	(United States) Bob Earl (United States) Bob Schader	(United States) Darin Brassfield	(United States) Les Lindley	(United States) Butch Leitzinger
8	Road America	(Germany) #7 Joest Racing	(United States) #49 Comptech Racing	(United States) #3 Rocketsports Racing	(United States) #47 Charles Morgan	(United States) #19 Auberlen Racing Concepts
8	Road America	(Germany) Manuel Reuter (Germany) "John Winter"	(United States) Parker Johnstone (United States) Dan Marvin	(United States) Paul Gentilozzi	(United States) Charles Morgan	(United States) Bill Auberlen
9	Laguna Seca	(United States) #98 All American Racers	(United States) #49 Comptech Racing	(United States) #76 Cunningham Racing	(United States) #47 Charles Morgan	(United States) #97 Leitzinger Racing
9	Laguna Seca	(United States) P. J. Jones	(United States) Parker Johnstone (United States) Dan Marvin	(United States) Johnny O'Connell	(United States) Charles Morgan	(United States) Butch Leitzinger
10	Portland	(United States) #99 All American Racers	(United States) #9 Brix Racing	(United States) #5 Rocketsports Racing	(United States) #17 Garfield's Auto	(United States) #97 Leitzinger Racing
10	Portland	(Argentina) Juan Manuel Fangio II	(United States) Bob Earl (United States) Bob Schader	(United States) Darin Brassfield	(United States) Joe Pezza	(United States) Butch Leitzinger
11	Phoenix	(United States) #98 All American Racers	(United States) #9 Brix Racing	(United States) #5 Rocketsports Racing	(United States) #17 Garfield's Auto	(United States) #97 Leitzinger Racing
11	Phoenix	(United States) P. J. Jones	(United States) Price Cobb (United States) Bob Schader	(United States) Darin Brassfield	(United States) Joe Pezza	(United States) Butch Leitzinger

== Championship standings ==
=== Drivers' Championships ===
==== GTP ====
Pos.	Driver	DAY	MIA	SEB	ATL	LIM	MOH	WGL	ELK	LGA	POR	PHX	Points
1	(Argentina) Juan Manuel Fangio II	4	**1**	**1**	1	1	1	1		**2**	**1**	2	183
2	(United States) P. J. Jones	**1**	2	3	**2**	**2**	**2**	**6**		1	2	**1**	168
3	(Italy) Giampiero Moretti	3	4	2	6	5	3	4	4		4	4	98
4	(United Kingdom) Derek Bell	3	4	2	6	5	3	4	4	4	4	4	88
5	(United States) John Paul Jr.	3		2		4			2	5	5	7	81
6	(Germany) Manuel Reuter	7	6	6	5			2	**1**			3	74
7	(Germany) "John Winter"	7	6	6	5			2	1			6	50
8	(Canada) David Tennyson		3	4	4						3		49
9	(United States) Price Cobb	2	3							3			47
11	(France) François Migault	DNS		4									41
12	(South Africa) Wayne Taylor		5	7	7	6	4	5	3	6	6	5	39
13	(United Kingdom) James Weaver	2		DNS									32
14	(United States) Mark Dismore	1											28
15	(United States) Hugh Fuller			4				3					27
16	(United Kingdom) Andy Wallace	4		1									25
17	(United States) Rocky Moran	1		3									17
18	(United States) Charles Slater								5	5	5	7	16
19	(United States) Jay Cochran	5		8		3							13
19	(France) Bob Wollek	7			3							6	13
19	(United States) Chris Cord	8		5									13
19	(United States) Jim Adams	8		5									13
23	(United Kingdom) Chris Hodgetts							3					12
23	(Germany) Ronny Meixner				3								12
25	(Italy) Massimo Sigala	3	9							4			10
26	(United States) Jeff Andretti		8	7									9
27	(Canada) Miroslav Jonak						5						8
31	(Brazil) Raul Boesel		7										4
31	(United Kingdom) Robs Lamplough									7			4

Colour	Result
Gold	Winner
Silver	Second place
Bronze	Third place
Green	Points classification
Blue	Non-points classification
Blue	Non-classified finish (NC)
Purple	Retired, not classified (Ret)
Red	Did not qualify (DNQ)
Red	Did not pre-qualify (DNPQ)
Black	Disqualified (DSQ)
White	Did not start (DNS)
White	Withdrew (WD)
White	Race cancelled (C)
Blank	Did not practice (DNP)
Blank	Did not arrive (DNA)
Blank	Excluded (EX)

**Bold** - Pole position
Italics - Fastest lap

==== GTP Lights ====
Pos.	Driver	DAY	MIA	SEB	ATL	LIM	MOH	WGL	ELK	LGA	POR	PHX	Points
1	(United States) Parker Johnstone	9	**1**	**1**	**1**	**1**	**1**	**7**	1	**1**	**2**	**6**	168
2	(United States) Bob Schader	8	4	2	3		3	1	2	2	1	1	148
3	(United States) Dan Marvin	DNS		1	1	1	1	DNS	1	1	2	DNS	145
4	(United States) Tim McAdam	1	2	3	2	7	2	5	4	4	6	2	140
5	(United States) Jim Downing	1	2	3	2	DNS	2	5	4	4	6	2	139
6	(United States) Bob Earl	**8**	4	2	3	4	3	1	**2**	2	1		127
7	(United States) Mike Sheehan	4		4	4	2		2	3	6	3	3	109
8	(United States) Jim Pace				4	2	4	2	3	DNS			62
9	(Canada) Neil Jamieson	7		5	5		5	3		5	4	4	61
10	(Canada) Jeff Lapcevich	7		5		3	5				4	4	53
11	(Italy) Ruggero Melgrati		1	1								7	46
12	(Canada) John Jones	7		5	5	3		3					45
13	(United States) John Grooms	1											28
13	(United States) Andy Evans	5	3										28
13	(United States) Charles Morgan	5	3										28
13	(Canada) Miroslav Jonak					5		8	5	3	5	5	28
13	(United States) Dick Sasser									3	5	5	28
18	(Canada) Ross Bentley	2											23
19	(United States) Price Cobb											1	21
20	(Spain) Fermín Vélez	3	3										20
20	(United States) John Marconi	3											20
20	(Canada) Jeremy Dale			2									20
23	(United States) Buddy Lazier	4											18
24	(Switzerland) Philippe Favre			4									15
25	(United States) Butch Hamlet										3	DNS	12
25	(United States) Michael Dow											3	12
27	(Canada) Ed De Long	6	8		7	6	7	4		5			10
27	(Canada) Nick Holmes	6						4					10
27	(United States) Bobby Brown				7		9	6	6				10
27	(United States) Ken Parschauer						4						10
31	(United States) Anthony Lazzaro	4		4	6								6
31	(United States) Sam Shalala	4		4	6								6
31	(United States) John Macaluso	6						6	6				6
31	(Canada) Charles Monk						6						6
31	(United States) John Higgins						6						6
36	(United Kingdom) Steve Deeks						8						3

==== WSC ====
WSC cars were counted as part of the GTP class for points standings.

Pos.	Driver	MIA	ATL	LIM	MOH	WGL	ELK	LGA	POR	PHX	Points
10	(United States) Andy Evans	2	**1**			1	**1**		1	**1**	42
11	(France) François Migault	**2**	1	**1**		**1**		**2**	**1**		41
27	(United States) Butch Hamlet									2	8
27	(United States) Jim Pace									2	8
30	(United States) David Rocha									3	6
31	(Germany) Oliver Kuttner				2		2	1	2		4
34	(United States) Brent O'Neill	1			**1**	2					3

==== GTS ====
Pos.	Driver	DAY	MIA	SEB	MOH	WGL	ELK	LGA	POR	PHX	Points
1	(United States) Tommy Kendall	1	5	2	**3**	2	3	**2**	**4**	3	132
2	(United States) Johnny O'Connell	3	3	1	4	**5**	5	1	3	**2**	122
3	(United States) Darin Brassfield	DNS	4	**4**	1	1	**6**	4	1	1	121
4	(United States) Paul Gentilozzi	**DNS**	1	3	2	6	1	3	5	4	92
5	(New Zealand) Steve Millen	3	**2**	1	5	4					68
6	(United States) Scott Pruett			4			2	7	2		45
7	(United States) Kent Painter	6		8		3	4				44
8	(United States) John Fergus	2		2							43
9	(United States) Bruce Trenery	6		8		3					34
10	(United States) Robbie Buhl	1									28
10	(United States) Wally Dallenbach Jr.	1		DNS							28
12	(United States) Daniel Urrutia	5		7							25
13	(United States) Jim Stevens	2									23
14	(United States) John Morton	3		1							20
15	(United States) Bill Cooper	4									18
15	(United States) Joe Pezza	4									18
15	(United States) Jon Gooding	4									18
18	(United States) Calvin Fish	20		3							17
19	(United States) Craig Rubright	5									16
20	(United States) Richard McDill	19		5							13
20	(United States) Tom Juckette	19		5							13
22	(United States) Andy Petery	9		6							11
22	(United States) John Macaluso			6							11
22	(United States) Thomas Schweitz	DNS		6							11
25	(United States) Gene Whipp	5		7							9
25	(United States) Luis Sereix			7							9
27	(Australia) Andrew Osman	6		8							8
27	(United States) R.J. Gottlieb							5			8
29	(United States) Dick Downs	7		9							7
29	(United States) Eddie Sharp			9							7
29	(United States) Eddie Sharp Jr.			9							7
32	(United States) Tommy Riggins	12	6	10							6

==== GTO ====
Pos.	Driver	MIA	MOH	WGL	ELK	LGA	POR	PHX	Points
1	(United States) Charles Morgan		**1**	4	1	1	3	2	97
2	(United States) Ken Bupp	5	2	5	7	4	2	3	68
3	(United States) Joe Pezza	DNS	4	9	2	7	1	**1**	65
3	(United States) Joe Llauget	2	3	7	3	6	4	6	65
5	(United States) Les Lindley	1	13	1	**9**	**3**	6	4	62
6	(United States) Brian DeVries		12	2	6	2	**5**	8	33
7	(United States) Dan Osterholt	3	6	3	8				30
7	(United States) Nick Cole	7	5	6	5			7	30
9	(United States) Mark Porcaro		7	10	4				14
10	(United States) Clay Young			3					12
11	(United States) Deborah Gregg	4							10
12	(United States) Flip Groggins	6		8					9
13	(United States) Casey Mollett	19						5	8
13	(United States) Peter Uria			5					8
13	(United States) Chuck Kendall					5			8
16	(United States) Gary Smith	8							3
16	(United States) Lance Leonelli	12	8					10	3
18	(United States) Jim Briody	9							2
18	(United States) Bill Fuller	DNS	11					9	2
18	(United States) Robert Rose		9						2
21	(United States) Michael Dingman	10							1
21	(United States) Chip Boatright		10						1

==== GTU ====
Pos.	Driver	DAY	MIA	SEB	MOH	WGL	ELK	LGA	POR	PHX	Points
1	(United States) Butch Leitzinger	**3**	**1**		1	**1**	2	1	**1**	**1**	155
2	(United States) Bob Leitzinger	3	4	5	2	3	2	3	3	4	119
3	(United States) Dick Greer	1	8	1	4	5	5	4	4	5	107
4	(United States) Bill Auberlen	7	2	7	6	2	**1**	**2**	5	3	100
5	(Peru) Eduardo Dibós	6	3	7	12	4	7	7	2	2	65
6	(United States) Peter Uria	1		1			10				53
6	(United States) Al Bacon	1		1							53
8	(United States) Bill Ferran			2	10	6	6				33
9	(United States) Charles Slater	5		2	13	6	10			6	32
10	(United States) Reed Kryder	10	DNS	3	7	7	9			7	29
11	(United States) Henry Camferdam	8			3	10	3			8	27
12	(United States) Anthony Lazzaro	2									23
12	(Switzerland) Omar Daniel	2									23
14	(United States) Butch Hamlet	5		2							20
15	(Ecuador) Henry Taleb	4	6								18
16	(France) Guy Kuster	10		3			9				17
17	(United States) Curt Catallo			4							15
17	(Canada) Ernie Lader			4							15
17	(United States) Haas Fogle			4							15
20	(United States) Don Knowles			**5**							13
21	(United States) Jack Lewis	9			8	8	6				12
21	(United States) Joe Cogbill	9				9	4				12
21	(United States) Jay Kjoller					9	4				12
24	(United States) Mel Butt			6							11
24	(United States) Ron Zitza			6							11
24	(United States) Tommy Johnson			6							11
27	(Dominican Republic) Tony Canahuate		5								8
27	(Dominican Republic) Eduardo Pellerano				**5**		8				8
27	(United States) John Goddard							5	7		8
30	(United States) Monte Shelton								6		6
31	(United States) Stephen Hynes	9				8					3
32	(United States) James O'Connell				9						2
