= 1992 IMSA GT Championship =

22nd season of the racing series organized by IMSA

Seasons
- ← 1991 1993 →

The 1992 Camel GT Championship and Exxon Supreme GT Series seasons were the 22nd season of the IMSA GT Championship auto racing series. It was for GTP and Lights classes of prototypes, as well as Grand Tourer-style racing cars which ran in the GTS, GTO, and GTU classes. It began February 1, 1992, and ended October 11, 1992, after fifteen rounds.

== Schedule ==
The GT and Prototype classes did not participate in all events, nor did they race together at shorter events. Races marked with All had all classes on track at the same time.

Rnd	Race	Length	Class	Circuit	Date
1	Rolex 24 at Daytona	24 Hours	All	Daytona International Speedway	February 1 February 2
2	Toyota Grand Prix of Miami	1 Hour	GT	Streets of Miami	February 22
2	Toyota Grand Prix of Miami	2 Hours	Proto	Streets of Miami	February 22
3	Contac 12 Hours of Sebring	12 Hours	All	Sebring International Raceway	March 21
4	Nissan Grand Prix of Atlanta	1 Hour 45 Minutes	Proto	Road Atlanta	April 26
5	The Nissan Grand Prix	2 Hours	GT	Mosport Park	May 18
6	Toyota Trucks Lime Rock Grand Prix	2 Hours	Proto	Lime Rock Park	May 25
7	Nissan Grand Prix of Ohio	1 Hour	GT	Mid-Ohio Sports Car Course	May 30
7	Nissan Grand Prix of Ohio	2 Hours	Proto	Mid-Ohio Sports Car Course	May 31
8	Grand Prix du Mardi Gras	1 Hour	GT	New Orleans street course	June 14
8	Grand Prix du Mardi Gras	1 Hour 45 Minutes	Proto	New Orleans street course	June 14
9	Camel Continental	2 Hours 45 Minutes	Proto	Watkins Glen International	June 28
10	Grand Auto Supply Camel GT	1 Hour	GT	Laguna Seca Raceway	July 18
10	Grand Auto Supply Camel GT	2 Hours	Proto	Laguna Seca Raceway	July 19
11	G.I. Joe's/Camel Grand Prix	1 Hour	GT	Portland International Raceway	July 26
11	G.I. Joe's/Camel Grand Prix	2 Hours	Proto	Portland International Raceway	July 26
12	Nissan Grand Prix of Road America	1 Hour	GT	Road America	August 9
12	Nissan Grand Prix of Road America	2 Hours	Proto	Road America	August 9
13	The Jamesway 300	1 Hour 45 Minutes	GT	Lime Rock Park	August 26
14	Checker Grand Prix	2 Hours	Proto	Phoenix International Raceway	October 4
15	Vons Grand Prix of San Diego	1 Hour	GT	Del Mar Fairgrounds	October 10
15	Vons Grand Prix of San Diego	2 Hours	Proto	Del Mar Fairgrounds	October 11

== Season results ==
=== Prototypes ===
Rnd	Circuit	GTP Winning Team	Lights Winning Team	Results
Rnd	Circuit	GTP Winning Drivers	Lights Winning Drivers	Results
1	Daytona	(United Kingdom) #2 Jaguar Racing^{†}	(United States) #49 Comptech Racing	Results
1	Daytona	(United States) Davy Jones (United States) Scott Pruett (Australia) David Brabham (Canada) Scott Goodyear	(United States) Parker Johnstone (United States) Steve Cameron (United States) Jimmy Vasser (United States) Dan Marvin	Results
2	Miami	(United States) #83 Nissan Performance	(United States) #49 Comptech Racing	Results
2	Miami	(Australia) Geoff Brabham	(United States) Parker Johnstone (United States) Dan Marvin	Results
3	Sebring	(United States) #99 All American Racers	(United States) #36 Downing Atlanta	Results
3	Sebring	(Argentina) Juan Manuel Fangio II (United Kingdom) Andy Wallace	(United States) Jim Downing (United States) Howard Katz (United States) Tim McAdam	Results
4	Road Atlanta	(United Kingdom) #2 Jaguar Racing	(United States) #49 Comptech Racing	Results
4	Road Atlanta	(United States) Davy Jones	(United States) Parker Johnstone (United States) Dan Marvin	Results
6	Lime Rock	(United States) #99 All American Racers	(United States) #49 Comptech Racing	Results
6	Lime Rock	(Argentina) Juan Manuel Fangio II	(United States) Parker Johnstone (United States) Dan Marvin	Results
7	Mid-Ohio	(United Kingdom) #2 Jaguar Racing	(United States) #44 Scandia Motorsports	Results
7	Mid-Ohio	(United States) Davy Jones	(United States) Andy Evans (Spain) Fermín Vélez	Results
8	New Orleans	(United States) #99 All American Racers	(United States) #45 Scandia Motorsports	Results
8	New Orleans	(Argentina) Juan Manuel Fangio II	(United States) Tommy Riggins (United States) Charles Morgan	Results
9	Watkins Glen	(United States) #99 All American Racers	(United States) #49 Comptech Racing	Results
9	Watkins Glen	(Argentina) Juan Manuel Fangio II	(United States) Parker Johnstone (United States) Dan Marvin	Results
10	Laguna Seca	(United States) #99 All American Racers	(United States) #48 Comptech Racing	Results
10	Laguna Seca	(Argentina) Juan Manuel Fangio II	(South Africa) Wayne Taylor (Italy) Ruggero Melgrati	Results
11	Portland	(United States) #98 All American Racers	(United States) #49 Comptech Racing	Results
11	Portland	(United States) P. J. Jones	(United States) Parker Johnstone (United States) Dan Marvin	Results
12	Road America	(United States) #99 All American Racers	(United States) #45 Scandia Motorsports	Results
12	Road America	(Argentina) Juan Manuel Fangio II	(United States) Tommy Riggins (United States) Charles Morgan	Results
14	Phoenix	(United States) #99 All American Racers	(United States) #48 Comptech Racing	Results
14	Phoenix	(Argentina) Juan Manuel Fangio II	(United States) Parker Johnstone (Italy) Ruggero Melgrati	Results
15	Del Mar	(United States) #98 All American Racers	(United States) #44 Scandia Motorsports	Results
15	Del Mar	(United States) P. J. Jones	(United States) Andy Evans (Spain) Fermín Vélez	Results

† - The 24 Hours of Daytona was won by Nissan Motorsports, but their car did not comply with GTP rules and therefore did not score points. Jaguar Racing was the highest finishing GTP class car.

=== Grand Tourers ===
Rnd	Circuit	GTS Winning Team	GTO Winning Team	GTU Winning Team	Results
Rnd	Circuit	GTS Winning Drivers	GTO Winning Drivers	GTU Winning Drivers	Results
1	Daytona	(United States) #15 Roush Racing	Did Not Participate^{†}	(United States) #82 Dick Greer Racing	Results
1	Daytona	(United States) Dorsey Schroeder (United States) Wally Dallenbach Jr. (United States) Robby Gordon		(United States) Dick Greer (United States) Al Bacon (United States) Mike Mees (United States) Peter Uria	Results
2	Miami	(United States) #75 Cunningham Racing	(United States) #41 Tommy Riggins	(United States) #96 Leitzinger Racing	Results
2	Miami	(New Zealand) Steve Millen	(United States) Tommy Riggins	(United States) David Loring	Results
3	Sebring	(United States) #51 Rocketsports	Did Not Participate^{†}	(United States) #96 Leitzinger Racing	Results
3	Sebring	(United States) George Robinson (United States) Irv Hoerr (United States) Darin Brassfield (United States) Paul Gentilozzi		(United States) John Paul Jr. (United States) David Loring	Results
5	Mosport	(United States) #76 Cunningham Racing	(United States) #48 Lindley Racing	(United States) #96 Leitzinger Motorsport	Results
5	Mosport	(Canada) Jeremy Dale	(United States) Les Lindley	(United States) David Loring	Results
7	Mid-Ohio	(United States) #75 Cunningham Racing	(United States) #48 Lindley Racing	(United States) #0 Full Time Racing	Results
7	Mid-Ohio	(New Zealand) Steve Millen	(United States) Les Lindley	(United States) John Fergus	Results
8	New Orleans	(United States) #75 Cunningham Racing	(United States) #4 Rocketsports	(United States) #97 Leitzinger Racing	Results
8	New Orleans	(New Zealand) Steve Millen	(United States) Irv Hoerr	(United States) Butch Leitzinger	Results
10	Laguna Seca	(United States) #3 Rocketsports	(United States) #4 Rocketsports	(United States) #0 Full Time Racing	Results
10	Laguna Seca	(United States) Paul Gentilozzi	(United States) Irv Hoerr	(United States) John Fergus	Results
11	Portland	(United States) #5 Rocketsports	(United States) #4 Rocketsports	(United States) #0 Full Time Racing	Results
11	Portland	(United States) Darin Brassfield	(United States) Irv Hoerr	(United States) John Fergus	Results
12	Road America	(United States) #3 Rocketsports	(United States) #4 Rocketsports	(United States) #97 Leitzinger Racing	Results
12	Road America	(United States) Paul Gentilozzi	(United States) Irv Hoerr	(United States) Butch Leitzinger	Results
13	Lime Rock	(United States) #75 Cunningham Racing	(United States) #4 Rocketsports	(United States) #7 Full Time Racing	Results
13	Lime Rock	(New Zealand) Steve Millen	(United States) Irv Hoerr	(United States) Don Walker	Results
15	Del Mar	(United States) #9 Roush Racing	(United States) #55 Bruce Nesbitt	(United States) #97 Leitzinger Racing	Results
15	Del Mar	(United States) Robby Gordon	(United States) Bruce Nesbitt	(United States) Butch Leitzinger	Results

† - The GTO class was combined with the GTS class for Daytona and Sebring.
