= 1991 IMSA GT Championship =

21st season of the racing series organized by IMSA

Seasons
- ← 1990 1992 →

The 1991 Camel GT Championship and Exxon Supreme GT Series seasons were the 21st season of the IMSA GT Championship auto racing series. It was for GTP and Lights classes of prototypes, as well as Grand Tourer-style racing cars which ran in the GTO and GTU classes, as well as a tube-frame All-American Challenge (AAC) class during select rounds. It began February 2, 1991, and ended October 13, 1991, after nineteen rounds.

== Schedule ==
The GT and Prototype classes did not participate in all events, nor did they race together at shorter events. The AAC class only participated in GT-only events. Races marked with All had all classes on track at the same time.

Rnd	Race	Length	Class	Circuit	Date
1	SunBank 24 at Daytona	24 Hours	All	Daytona International Speedway	February 2 February 3
2	Toyota Camel Grand Prix of Palm Beach	1 Hour	GTO/GTU	West Palm Beach Street Circuit	March 2
2	Toyota Camel Grand Prix of Palm Beach	2 Hours	Proto	West Palm Beach Street Circuit	March 3
2	Toyota Camel Grand Prix of Palm Beach	30 Minutes	AAC	West Palm Beach Street Circuit	March 3
3	12 Hours of Sebring	12 Hours	All	Sebring International Raceway	March 16
4	Nissan Camel Grand Prix of Miami	1 Hour	GT	Streets of Miami	April 6
4	Nissan Camel Grand Prix of Miami	2 Hours	Proto	Streets of Miami	April 7
5	Toyota Grand Prix of Long Beach	1 Hour	GT	Long Beach Street Circuit	April 13
6	Nissan Grand Prix of Atlanta	300 km	Proto	Road Atlanta	April 28
7	Camel Grand Prix of the Heartland	300 km	Proto	Heartland Park	May 5
8	Nissan Grand Prix of Mosport	300 km	GT	Mosport Park	May 20
9	Toyota Trucks Lime Rock Grand Prix	2 Hours	Proto	Lime Rock Park	May 26
10	Nissan Grand Prix of Ohio	1 Hour	GT	Mid-Ohio Sports Car Course	June 1
10	Nissan Grand Prix of Ohio	300 km	Proto	Mid-Ohio Sports Car Course	June 2
11	Nissan Grand Prix du Mardi Gras	1 Hour	GT	New Orleans Street Circuit	June 15
11	Nissan Grand Prix du Mardi Gras	2 Hours	Proto	New Orleans Street Circuit	June 16
12	Camel Continental	500 km	Proto	Watkins Glen International	June 30
13	Grand Auto Supply Camel GT	1 Hour	GT	Laguna Seca Raceway	July 20
13	Grand Auto Supply Camel GT	300 km	Proto	Laguna Seca Raceway	July 21
14	G.I. Joe's/Camel Grand Prix	300 km	Proto	Portland International Raceway	July 28
14	G.I. Joe's/Camel Grand Prix	1 Hour 30 Minutes	GT	Portland International Raceway	July 28
15	Nissan Grand Prix of Road America	300 km	Proto	Road America	August 25
15	Nissan Grand Prix of Road America	200 km	GT	Road America	August 25
16	Road Atlanta 300	1 Hour 45 Minutes	GT	Road Atlanta	September 1
17	The New York 500	500 km	GT	Watkins Glen International	September 22
18	The Jamesway 300	2 Hours	GT	Lime Rock Park	September 28
19	Camel Grand Prix of Greater San Diego	1 Hour	GT	Del Mar Fairgrounds	October 12
19	Camel Grand Prix of Greater San Diego	2 Hours	Proto	Del Mar Fairgrounds	October 13

== Season results ==
Rnd	Circuit	GTP Winning Team	Lights Winning Team	GTO Winning Team	GTU Winning Team	Results
Rnd	Circuit	GTP Winning Drivers	Lights Winning Drivers	GTO Winning Drivers	GTU Winning Drivers	Results
1	Daytona	(Germany) #7 Joest Racing	(United States) #48 Comptech Acura	(United States) #15 Whistler Mustang	(United States) #82 Greer Racing	Results
1	Daytona	(Germany) Frank Jelinski (Germany) "John Winter" (France) Henri Pescarolo (France) Bob Wollek (United States) Hurley Haywood	(United States) Parker Johnstone (United States) Steve Cameron (United States) Doug Peterson (United States) Bob Lesnett	(United States) Mark Martin (United States) Wally Dallenbach Jr. (United States) Robby Gordon	(United States) Dick Greer (United States) Al Bacon (United States) Mike Mees (United States) Peter Uria	Results
2	Palm Beach	(United Kingdom) #2 Bud Light Jaguar	(United States) #48 Comptech Racing	(United States) #62 Mazda Motorsports	(United States) #07 Full Time Racing	Results
2	Palm Beach	(United States) Davy Jones	(United States) Parker Johnstone	(United States) Peter Halsmer	(United States) John Fergus	Results
3	Sebring	(United States) #83 Nissan Performance	(United States) #8 Essex Racing	(United States) #15 Roush Racing	(United States) #95 Leitzinger Racing	Results
3	Sebring	(Australia) Geoff Brabham (Australia) Gary Brabham (Republic of Ireland) Derek Daly	(United States) Charles Morgan (United States) Jim Pace	(United States) Robby Gordon (United States) Max Jones	(United States) Bob Leitzinger (United States) David Loring	Results
4	Miami	(United Kingdom) #3 Bud Light Jaguar	(United States) #48 Comptech Racing	(United States) #62 Mazda Motorsports	(United States) #96 Leitzinger Racing	Results
4	Miami	(Brazil) Raul Boesel	(United States) Parker Johnstone	(United States) Peter Halsmer	(United States) David Loring	Results
5	Long Beach	Did not participate	Did not participate	(United States) #75 Cunningham Racing	(United States) #07 Full Time Racing	Results
5	Long Beach			(New Zealand) Steve Millen	(United States) John Fergus	Results
6	Road Atlanta	(United Kingdom) #2 Bud Light Jaguar	(United States) #48 Comptech Racing	Did not participate	Did not participate	Results
6	Road Atlanta	(United States) Davy Jones	(United States) Parker Johnstone			Results
7	Heartland	(United States) #84 Nissan Performance	(United States) #48 Comptech Racing	Did not participate	Did not participate	Results
7	Heartland	(United States) Chip Robinson	(United States) Parker Johnstone			Results
8	Mosport Park	Did not participate	Did not participate	(United States) #62 Mazda Motorsports	(United States) #07 Full Time Racing	Results
8	Mosport Park			(United States) Pete Halsmer	(United States) John Fergus	Results
9	Lime Rock	(United States) #84 Nissan Performance	(Canada) #19 David Tennyson	Did not participate	Did not participate	Results
9	Lime Rock	(United States) Chip Robinson	(Canada) David Tennyson (United States) Ken Knott			Results
10	Mid-Ohio	(United Kingdom) #2 Bud Light Jaguar	(United States) #48 Comptech Racing	(United States) #76 Cunningham Racing	(United States) #07 Full Time Racing	Results
10	Mid-Ohio	(United States) Davy Jones	(United States) Parker Johnstone	(Canada) Jeremy Dale	(United States) John Fergus	Results
11	New Orleans	(United States) #64 MTI Racing	(Canada) #19 David Tennyson	(United States) #63 Mazda Motorsports	(United States) #96 Leitzinger Racing	Results
11	New Orleans	(South Africa) Wayne Taylor	(Canada) David Tennyson	(United States) Price Cobb	(United States) David Loring	Results
12	Watkins Glen	(United States) #99 All American Racers	(United States) #48 Comptech Racing	Did not participate	Did not participate	Results
12	Watkins Glen	(Argentina) Juan Manuel Fangio II	(United States) Parker Johnstone			Results
13	Laguna Seca	(United Kingdom) #2 Bud Light Jaguar	(Canada) #80 Bieri Racing	(United States) #63 Mazda Motorsports	(United States) #07 Full Time Racing	Results
13	Laguna Seca	(United States) Davy Jones	(Italy) Ruggero Melgrati	(United States) Price Cobb	(United States) Jeff Purner	Results
14	Portland	(United States) #99 All American Racers	(Canada) #80 Bieri Racing	(United States) #9 Roush Racing	(United States) #00 Full Time Racing	Results
14	Portland	(Argentina) Juan Manuel Fangio II	(Italy) Ruggero Melgrati	(United States) Robby Gordon	(United States) John Fergus	Results
15	Road America	(United Kingdom) #2 Bud Light Jaguar	(United States) #9 Essex Racing Team	(United States) #75 Cunningham Racing	(United States) #00 Full Time Racing	Results
15	Road America	(United States) Davy Jones	(United States) Jim Pace	(New Zealand) Steve Millen	(United States) John Fergus	Results
16	Road Atlanta	Did not participate	Did not participate	(United States) #9 Roush Racing	(United States) #07 Full Time Racing	Results
16	Road Atlanta			(United States) Robby Gordon	(United States) Jeff Purner	Results
17	Watkins Glen	Did not participate	Did not participate	(United States) #75 Cunningham Racing	(United States) #00 Full Time Racing	Results
17	Watkins Glen			(New Zealand) Steve Millen (Canada) Jeremy Dale	(United States) John Fergus	Results
18	Lime Rock	Did not participate	Did not participate	(United States) #75 Cunningham Racing	(United States) #00 Full Time Racing	Results
18	Lime Rock			(New Zealand) Steve Millen	(United States) John Fergus	Results
19	Del Mar	(United States) #99 All American Racers	(United States) #49 Comptech Racing	(United States) #9 Roush Racing	(United States) #95 Leitzinger Racing	Results
19	Del Mar	(Argentina) Juan Manuel Fangio II	(United States) Parker Johnstone	(United States) Robby Gordon	(United States) Bob Leitzinger	Results

== Championship Tables ==
=== GTP ===
Place	Driver	Entrant	Total
1	(Australia) Geoff Brabham	Nissan Performance Technology	175
2	(United States) Chip Robinson	Nissan Performance Technology	170
3	(United States) Davy Jones	Bud Light Jaguar Racing	158
4	(South Africa) Wayne Taylor	MTI Racing	117
5	(Argentina) Juan Manuel Fangio II	All American Racers	107
6	(Brazil) Raul Boesel	Bud Light Jaguar Racing	72
7	(United States) Tom Kendall	Jim Miller Racing; MTI Racing	69
8	(United States) Brian Bonner	Tom Milner Racing	54
9	(Germany) Bernd Schneider	Joest Racing	49
10	(Republic of Ireland) Derek Daly	Nissan Performance Technology	48
11	(France) Henri Pescarolo	Joest Racing	44
12	(Germany) Frank Jelinski	Joest Racing	43
13	(United States) Rocky Moran	All American Racers	41
14	(United States) Jim Adams	Dyson Racing; Hotchkis Racing	40
15	(United Kingdom) James Weaver	Dyson Racing; John Shapiro Racing	36
16	(United States) Chris Cord	Dyson Racing; Hotchkis Racing	32
17	(United States) Scott Sharp	Tom Milner Racing	30
18=	(Italy) Giampiero Moretti	Momo-Gebhardt Racing	29
	(United States) Jeff Purner	Tom Milner Racing	29
20	(United States) Bob Earl	Nissan Performance Technology	28
etc.
