= Grand Prix du Mardi Gras =

Motorsports Park in Louisiana

- Location: New Orleans, Louisiana
- Coordinates: 29°57′9.35″N 90°4′48.82″W
- Opened: 1991
- Closed: 1995
- Major events: IMSA GT Championship (1991–1992, 1995); Barber Pro Series (1991–1992, 1995)

Grand Prix Circuit (1992, 1995)
- Surface: Asphalt and concrete
- Length: 1.430 mi (2.301 km)
- Turns: 11
- Race lap record: 1:05.217 ( (United States) Davy Jones, Jaguar XJR-14, 1992, IMSA GTP)

Original Circuit (1991)
- Surface: Asphalt and concrete
- Length: 1.300 mi (2.092 km)
- Turns: 10
- Race lap record: 1:01.363 ( (United Kingdom) Perry McCarthy, Spice SE90P, 1991, IMSA GTP)

The Grand Prix du Mardi Gras was an IMSA GT Championship street race held in New Orleans, Louisiana in 1991, 1992 and 1995.

The 1991 IMSA GTP/Lights race was held on June 16, 1991 using a 1.300 mi (2.092 km) circuit near the Mississippi River. The winner of 105.30 mi (169.46 km) 81 lap race was Wayne Taylor with Geoff Brabham finishing second and Jeff Purner and Tim McAdam finishing tied for 3rd place.

On June 14, 1992, the IMSA GTP/Lights street race was moved to a 1.430 mi (2.301 km) circuit around the Louisiana Superdome. The winner of 127.27 mi (204.82 km) 89 lap race was Juan Fangio II with Geoff Brabham and P.J. Jones finishing 2nd and 3rd.

In 1995, the Grand Prix du Mardi Gras IMSA GTS-2 street race was run on the 1.430 mi (2.301 km) circuit around the Louisiana Superdome on October 8. The winner of the 41.47 mi (66.74 km) 29 lap race was Bill Auberlen with Kevin Buckler and Jorge Trejos finishing 2nd and 3rd. This would be the last major race in the New Orleans area until the 2015 Indy Grand Prix of Louisiana at NOLA Motorsports Park.

== Lap records ==
The fastest official race lap records at the Grand Prix du Mardi Gras (New Orleans) are listed as:

Category	Time	Driver	Vehicle	Event
Grand Prix Circuit (1992, 1995): 1.430 mi (2.301 km)
IMSA GTP	1:05.217	Davy Jones	Jaguar XJR-14	1992 Grand Prix du Mardi Gras
WSC	1:08.948	James Weaver	Riley & Scott Mk III	1995 New Orleans 1 h 45 min
IMSA GTP Lights	1:09.429	Fermin Velez	Kudzu DG-2	1992 Grand Prix du Mardi Gras
IMSA GTS-1	1:11.726	Darin Brassfield	Oldsmobile Cutlass Supreme	1995 New Orleans 1 h 45 min
IMSA GTS-2	1:12.514	Bill Auberlen	Porsche 911	1995 New Orleans 1 h 45 min
IMSA GTS	1:16.801	Darin Brassfield	Oldsmobile Cutlass	1992 Grand Prix du Mardi Gras
IMSA Supercar	1:16.875	Martin Snow	Porsche 911 Turbo	1995 New Orleans 1 h 45 min
IMSA GTO	1:21.242	Irv Hoerr	Oldsmobile Cutlass	1992 Grand Prix du Mardi Gras
IMSA GTU	1:21.738	Butch Leitzinger	Nissan 240SX	1992 Grand Prix du Mardi Gras
Original Circuit (1991): 1.300 mi (2.092 km)
IMSA GTP	1:01.363	Perry McCarthy	Spice SE90P	1991 New Orleans 2 Hours
IMSA GTP Lights	1:06.997	Parker Johnstone	Spice SE90P	1991 New Orleans 2 Hours
IMSA GTO	1:08.672	Price Cobb	Mazda RX-7	1991 New Orleans 2 Hours
IMSA GTU	1:13.701	John Fergus	Dodge Daytona	1991 New Orleans 2 Hours
IMSA AAC	1:14.081	Anthony Puleo	Chevrolet Camaro	1991 New Orleans 2 Hours

== Winners ==
Year	Date	Driver	Entrant	Car	Race title
1991	June 15-16	(South Africa) Wayne Taylor	(United States) MTI Racing	Intrepid RM-1	Nissan Grand Prix du Mardi Gras
1992	June 14	(Argentina) Juan Manuel Fangio II	(United States) All American Racers	Eagle MkIII	Grand Prix du Mardi Gras
1993–1994	Not held				
1995	October 8	(United Kingdom) James Weaver	(United States) Dyson Racing	Riley & Scott Mk III	Acxiom Grand Prix du Mardi Gras
