= Eagle MkIII =

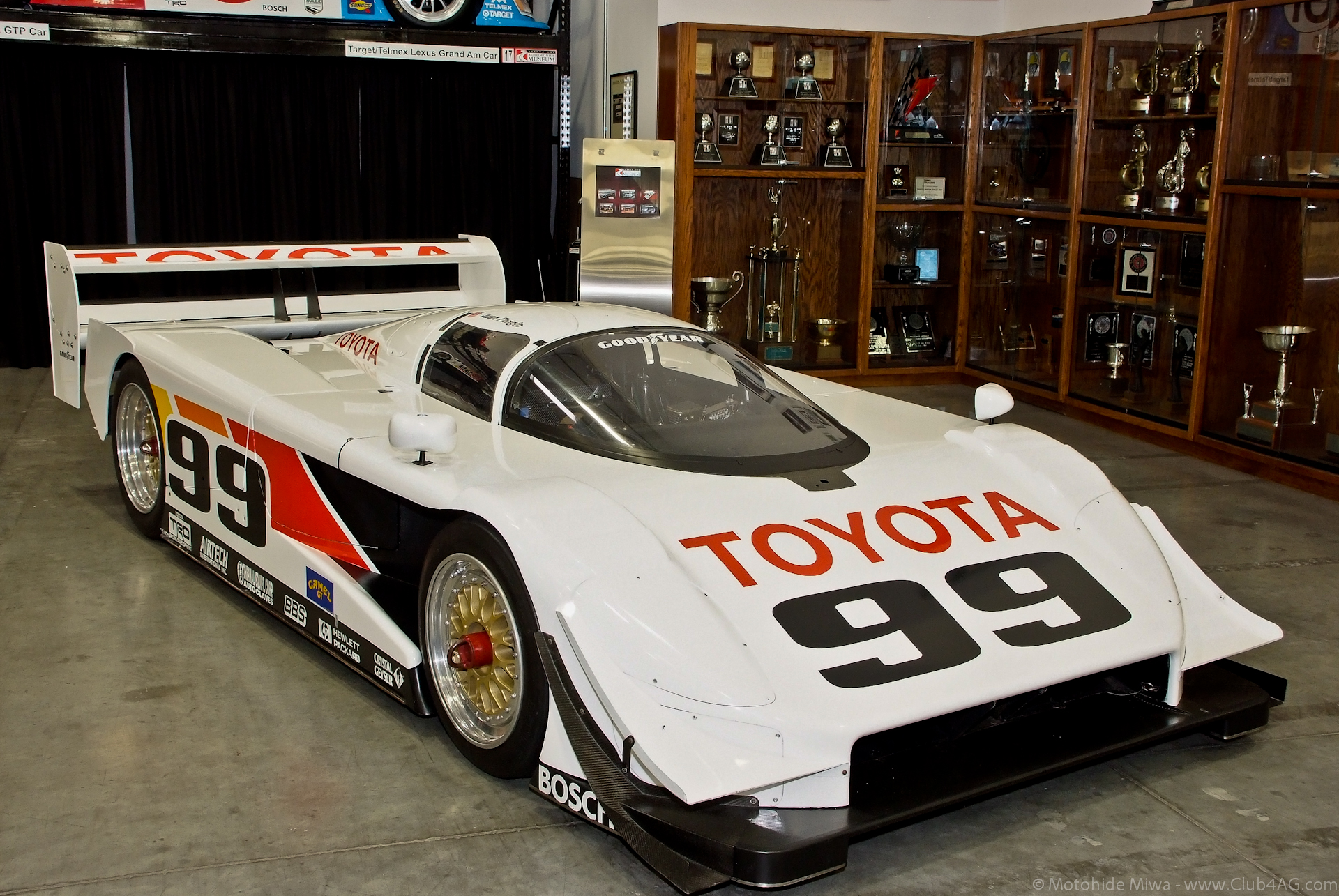
- Category: IMSA GTP
- Constructor: All American Racers
- Designer(s): John Ward; Hiro Fujimori (aerodynamicist)
- Predecessor: Eagle HF90

Technical specifications
- Chassis: Carbon fibre and aluminum honeycomb composite monocoque with steel roll cage
- Suspension (front): Double wishbone with pushrod-actuated inboard spring/damper
- Suspension (rear): Double wishbone with pushrod-actuated bellhousing-mounted spring/damper
- Length: 189 in (480.1 cm)
- Width: 79 in (200.7 cm)
- Height: 40 in (101.6 cm)
- Wheelbase: 105 in (266.7 cm)
- Engine: Toyota 3S-GTM 2.1 L (128 cu in) inline-4 with single Garrett AiResearch turbocharger and intercooler, mid-mounted.
- Transmission: Ray Eades/March 5-speed + reverse manual
- Weight: 832 kg (1,834 lb) 1992; 914 kg (2,015 lb) 1993
- Fuel: Elf custom racing fuel (82% toluene)
- Tyres: Goodyear Eagle; BBS wheels, 13x17 front, 15x17 rear

Competition history
- Notable entrants: All American Racers
- Notable drivers: (Argentina) Juan Manuel Fangio II (United States) P. J. Jones (United Kingdom) Andy Wallace (United States) Rocky Moran (United States) Mark Dismore
- Debut: 1991 Grand Auto Supply Camel GT
- First win: 1991 G.I. Joe's/Camel Grand Prix
- Last win: 1993 The Checker Camel Phoenix Grand Prix
- Last event: 1993 The Checker Camel Phoenix Grand Prix
Races	Wins	Poles	F/Laps
27	21	18	16
- Teams' Championships: 2 (All American Racers, 1992 & 1993)
- Constructors' Championships: 2 (All American Racers, 1992 & 1993)
- Drivers' Championships: 2 (Juan Manuel Fangio II, 1992 & 1993)

The Eagle MkIII is a sports prototype racing car built by All American Racers in 1991 to IMSA GTP specifications. Powered by a turbocharged Toyota inline-4 engine, the car was campaigned in the IMSA Camel GT series by Dan Gurney's Toyota-sponsored AAR team from 1991 through to the end of 1993. The Eagle MkIII won 21 out of the 27 races in which it was entered and is considered one of the most successful and technologically advanced designs of the IMSA GTP era — "a car that proved so overwhelmingly dominant that the class for which it was created has now been assigned to history", according to Racer magazine.

== Precursors ==
From 1989 through 1991, AAR campaigned the Eagle HF89 (also known as the MkII), the team's first in-house, race-ready IMSA GTP design. While some success was had with the HF89 and its HF90 evolution, the chassis had a very small margin for setup error — in the words of driver Juan Manuel Fangio II, "When we were in the window, the car was good in every way, but out of the window, the car was not right at all." It was clear to the team that a clean-sheet design was needed to significantly advance the chassis and provide the best platform for competing against the Nissan and Jaguar factory entries.

== Design and development ==
Two veteran AAR designers were tasked with leading the design of the MkIII chassis. John Ward focused on the tub and mechanical aspects of the car, while Hiro Fujimori was responsible for aerodynamics and styling — hence, the car was internally codenamed WFO 91 for Ward, Fujimori and Others, 1991. Team members nicknamed the project "Wide F'n Open". The design parameters given to the team were not groundbreaking and the designers looked to avoid risky, cutting-edge solutions wherever possible; rather, for reliability's sake, the mantra was to make the chassis simple while taking full advantage of proven technologies. However, there was one significant technological advance planned: the MkIII would be the first carbon-fiber monocoque manufactured in-house by AAR.

"What we did with the MkIII was to address just about every weakness of the MkII," Gurney said. "It was not a styling exercise; everything was driven by functional considerations, and it was really a clean sheet of paper from virtually every standpoint."

One of the primary flaws with the HF89/90 had been a persistent lack of front grip; combined with overwhelming amounts of rear downforce, this created an intractably imbalanced car with a significant tendency to understeer. On the slower, more technical circuits on the IMSA schedule, this was a major competitive disadvantage. Thus, on the MkIII, the team first focused on creating more front downforce. This led to the inclusion of an integral front diffuser in the nose to stabilize underbody airflow and create a low-pressure zone directly under the front wheels. This was a break from the tradition of GTP and Group C cars, which had almost exclusively adhered to a single underbody with one set of tunnels running from front to rear. Working in tandem with the standard ground effect tunnels under the rear of the car, the nose diffuser would balance front and rear grip while minimizing drag.

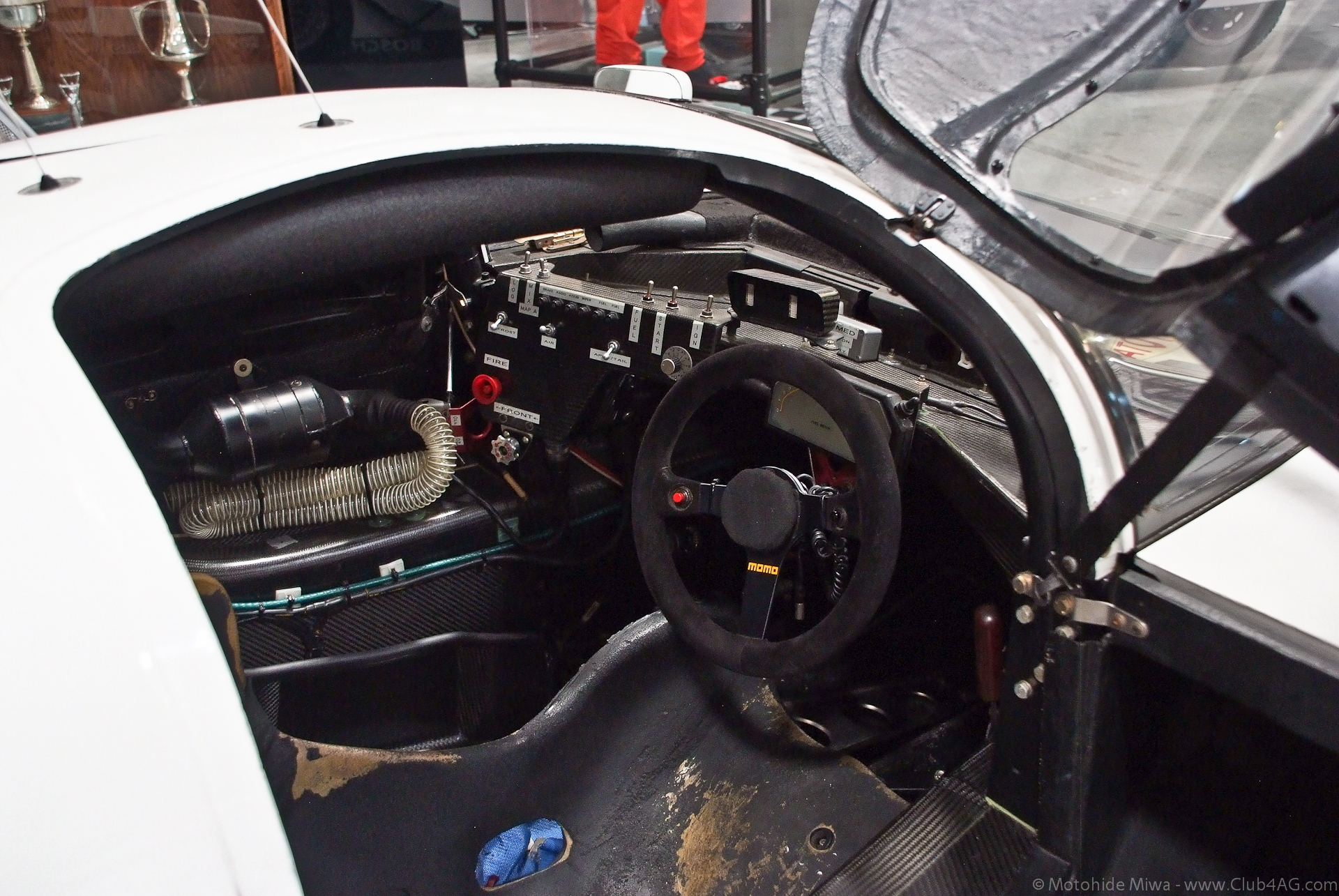
The cockpit of an Eagle MkIII

To test and refine the design, a 20%-scale wind tunnel model was built, accurately replicating not just the car's external features but internal components as well — detailed down to the car's wiring, air ducting and engine bay plumbing. Several different nose concepts were modeled and discarded before settling on a final design. In an effort to conceal the innovative nose air extractors, the bodywork immediately behind the front wheels was painted black.

Racing car designer and aerodynamics expert Michael Fuller wrote that "the most striking feature of the MkIII was the single nose air inlet that channeled air through massive ducting to midmounted water, water-to-oil and turbo intercooler radiators." By using a single aperture to feed several cooling systems, surface turbulence and drag created by air inlets was minimized. This contributed to a clean, uncluttered design that provided for smooth airflow to the rear wing, enhancing its efficiency. The front cross-section of the monocoque was also minimized as much as possible within the rules, in order to reduce drag.

The turbocharged Toyota engine was largely carried over from the HF90, with the addition of a new electronic engine management system. By applying a high level of boost to the 2.1-litre stock-block engine, Toyota Racing Development's shop in Torrance, California was able to wring more than 800 horsepower out of what was the smallest-displacement powerplant used in the GTP series at that point. "I was told that (TRD) blew up four dynamometers... (they) didn't spare the horses," Gurney later said.

For its first on-track test in the summer of 1991, AAR took the MkIII to Willow Springs Raceway, a frequent testing ground for the team. It was immediately apparent that the new MkIII was vastly superior to the HF90/MkII. "Why, it just blew off the MkII. It was obvious," Gurney said.

== Racing history ==
=== 1991 ===
The Eagle MkIII made its racing debut late in the 1991 IMSA Camel GT season, in the hands of Juan Manuel Fangio II at the 1991 Grand Auto Supply Camel GT on July 21 at Laguna Seca Raceway in Monterey, California. As the MkIII was a yet-unproven design, the team also entered an HF90 chassis for teammate P. J. Jones. Though a pit stop penalty dropped Fangio to seventh when the checkered flag fell, he and the MkIII led most of the race by almost a minute, showing dominating speed throughout — an early portent of what was to come. At the next race at Portland International Raceway in Portland, Oregon, Fangio captured the MkIII's maiden victory.

=== 1992 ===
The 1992 IMSA Camel GT season opened with one of the most competitive fields ever assembled in the series, and it promised to be a pitched championship battle. AAR's two-car effort with the Toyota Eagle MkIII would be pitted against similar two-car entries from a pair of major factory contenders: the four-time defending champion Nissan factory NPT-91 and the new-to-GTP Jaguar XJR-14, powered by a detuned-for-WSC Formula 1 engine. But as it transpired, neither the Nissan nor the Jaguar would prove to be anything close to a match for Gurney's Toyota-powered Eagle. Of the season's 13 races, Jaguar would manage three wins, Nissan one — and the remaining 9 were all Toyota victories, including the final seven in a row.

At the 24 Hours of Daytona, the still-developing MkIII had mixed results. The #98 of P. J. Jones, Rocky Moran and Mark Dismore finished a solid fourth, while the #99 of Juan Manuel Fangio II, Andy Wallace and Kenny Acheson suffered mechanical maladies that left it more than 100 laps down at the race's conclusion.

The Eagle MkIII and AAR would prove to be a victim of their own success — the car proved to be so dominant that Nissan and Jaguar withdrew their factory teams from the series at the end of the season.

=== 1993 ===
Without Nissan and Jaguar, there was little competition for the AAR/Toyota team and the writing was on the wall for the GTP formula — the 1993 IMSA Camel GT season was to be the last for the budget-busting prototypes. Only a handful of GTPs contested the full season, but it did not matter — Fangio, Jones and the MkIII clearly outclassed the field. The two drivers combined to win 10 out of the season's 11 races. The only race the MkIII did not win that season, it was not even entered — for reasons never explained to Gurney, Toyota withheld funding for the season's 8th round, at Road America. This broke the team's IMSA GTP winning streak at 14 consecutive races — however, the MkIII went on to win the season's final three rounds, so AAR refers to the car as winning 17 consecutive races entered. At the end of the year, the GTP category was discontinued and Toyota withdrew support. The MkIII had run its last race in earnest.

== Racing record ==
Year	No.	Drivers	1	2	3	4	5	6	7	8	9	10	11	12	13	14
1991			D24	WPB	S12	MIA	ATL	HPT	LRP	MOH	NOR	WGI	LS	POR	ROA	DLM
1991	98	(United States) Rocky Moran														19
1991	99	(Argentina) Juan Manuel Fangio II											7	1	19	1
1992			D24	MIA	S12	ATL	LRP	MOH	NOR	WGI	LS	POR	PHO	RAM	DLM	
1992	98	(United States) P. J. Jones	4	17	10	10	14	7	3	14	2	1	2	12	1	
1992	99	(Argentina) Juan Manuel Fangio II	11	14	1	14	1	2	1	1	1	2	1	1	19	
1993			D24	MIA	S12	AMS	LRP	MOH	WGI	ROA	LGA	POR	PHO			
1993	98	(United States) P. J. Jones	1	2	3	2	2	2	2		1	2	1			
1993	99	(Argentina) Juan Manuel Fangio II	27	1	1	1	1	1	1		2	1	2			

Key
Colour	Result
Gold	Winner
Silver	Second place
Bronze	Third place
Green	Other points position
Blue	Other classified position
Blue	Not classified, finished (NC)
Purple	Not classified, retired (Ret)
Red	Did not qualify (DNQ)
Red	Did not pre-qualify (DNPQ)
Black	Disqualified (DSQ)
White	Did not start (DNS)
White	Race cancelled (C)
Light blue	Practiced only (PO)
Light blue	Thursday/Friday test driver (TD) (from 2003 onwards)
Blank	Did not practice (DNP)
Blank	Excluded (EX)
Blank	Did not arrive (DNA)
Blank	Withdrawn (WD)
Text formatting	Meaning
**Bold**	Pole position
Italics	Fastest lap
^{Superscript}	Sprint race result
Abbreviation	Meaning
WDC	World Drivers' Championship position
WCC	World Constructors' Championship position
NC	Not classified
