= Pegasus WSC =

- Category: World Sports Cars (WSC)
- Constructor: Pegasus Racing

Technical specifications
- Engine: BMW naturally-aspirated, mid-engined
- Tyres: Goodyear

Competition history
- Notable entrants: Pegasus Racing
- Notable drivers: Oliver Kuttner
- Debut: 1993 Grand Prix of Ohio
Races	Wins
4	0 (1 class)
- Teams' Championships: 0
- Constructors' Championships: 0
- Drivers' Championships: 0

The Pegasus WSC was a sports prototype racing car built by Pegasus Racing in 1993 to the World Sports Cars regulations. Originally built as a Lotus Esprit, the Pegasus WSC featured significantly modified bodywork and a naturally aspirated BMW engine in place of the usual Lotus 900 series unit. The car was used in a handful of races before being replaced by a new car, derived from the Argo JM16.

== Racing history ==
In 1993, IMSA GT Championship team Pegasus Racing opted to rebuild a third-generation Lotus Esprit to the new World Sports Cars (WSC) regulations. The resulting car had heavily modified bodywork, and, in place of the usual Lotus 900 series engine, a naturally-aspirated BMW unit was installed. The car's debut came at the sixth round of the IMSA season, which was the Grand Prix of Ohio, with Oliver Kuttner behind the wheel; it would not prove to be successful, as a mechanical problem forced him to retire from 19th, and saw him classified 17th, and last. Kuttner next drove the car two rounds later, at the Road America 500; however, an engine failure after 6 laps restricted him to 41st overall. Mechanical issues struck again at the next race, held at Laguna Seca, but Kuttner's 44 laps were enough to secure the WSC class victory, and 12th overall. The class victory was due to the #43 Scandia Kudzu DG-2 (another WSC car) failed after 38 laps. Kuttner then entered the next round of the series, which was the Portland Grand Prix; for the first time, he was able to finish the race, albeit in 12th overall and second in class. This would prove to be the WSC's last race, as Pegasus Racing opted to build a new car, based on the Argo JM16, for the following season.
