= Dan Marvin =

American racing driver

Daniel J. Marvin (born 12 August 1952) is a former American racing driver.

Marvin primarily competed in CASC North American Atlantic Championship competition from 1981 to 1983 and then won the WCAR Formula Atlantic title in 1984. He also drove in the SCCA Single-seater Can-Am Series and later drove in IMSA Camel Lights, winning several class victories in 1992 (including the 24 Hours of Daytona where they were fifth overall) with teammate Parker Johnstone and finishing third in 1993 for Comptech Racing.

Marvin competed in the 24 Hours of Daytona in 1989 for Huffaker Racing in a Pontiac powered Spice and again in 1993 for Comptech Racing in their Acura-powered Spice. He returned to the race in 1997 driving a Prototype Technology Group BMW M3 in the GTS3 class.
