= Ronny Meixner =

German racing driver

Ronny Meixner (born February 27, 1964) is a German racing driver and the founder of VICI Racing.

== Racing career ==
Meixner started his auto racing career in Formula Ford & Formula Renault going on to sports cars with Porsche Carrera Cup.

=== 1993 Success ===
In 1993, Meixner raced in ADAC GT Cup with Porsche Carrera RSR. That year Meixner also won the Daytona 24 Hours GT Class driving a Porsche 964 Cup from VICI Racing's private Porsche entry beating factory opposition. He shared the car with Enzo Calderari and Luigino Pagotto. The car led for the last 17 of the 24 hours and won with an hour's advantage over the next finisher. The trio then finished fourth in GT in the 12 Hours of Sebring. Also that year, Meixner competed in the Le Mans 24 hour in Porsche 962C for the factory supported Joest Racing Porsche team. Teammates were Bob Wollek and Henri Pescarolo. They finished in 9th place.

Meixner then raced the famous Porsche 962 "Double Wing" for Joest Racing to its first podium finish - third place at Road Atlanta in the IMSA GT Championship, sharing the cockpit with Bob Wollek. The Porsche 962 "Double Wing" was developed for Joest Racing by Porsche engineer Norbert Singer who had designed the original car and is affectionately known as the "father of the 962" as a final evolution of the famous race car and was the fastest and most powerful version of the 962 line and fitted with an enormous rear wing after wind tunnel testing.

=== Later racing ===
In 1995, Meixner undertook pre season development test programme for Champion Racing with the Porsche 911 GT2 and raced in 12 Hours of Sebring for the factory BMW run by Team PTG with co-drivers were Justin Bell and David Donohue. The car retired after major accident damage. In 2006, his VICI Racing was the first team to race a Lamborghini GTR at the 12 Hours of Sebring becoming the first team to bring Lamborghini to U.S endurance racing. He shared the cockpit with co-drivers Joseph Safina and Cristianio Piquet.

=== Personal life ===
In his spare time, Meixner enjoys piloting historic war planes and karting. Meixner is married and likes to spend time with his family.
