= Comptech =

American racing car engine company

Comptech, also known as Comptech Racing, is a company that designs and builds racing car engines. It was originally established in Sunnyvale, California, in the late 1970s by Doug Petersen and Don Erb. The company moved to a new location in Rancho Cordova, California, in the mid 1980s, then to El Dorado Hills, California. The original Comptech closed its doors in February 2007. The race engine shop was purchased by a previously existing circle track racing supply company, Penney Racing. Comptech's Chief Executive Officer is Frederick W. Penney. The wildly successful aftermarket parts side is still in operation today under the name 'CT Engineering' run out of Rancho Cordova, California.

== History ==
Comptech launched Honda North America's race efforts in mid 1980s, beginning with the preparation of the first Honda Race Car in North America (1985 Honda CRX). In 1991, Acura reached an agreement with the Comptech Racing to use the V6 motor of the all-new Acura NSX in Comptech's Camel Lights Spice prototype. Acura would go on to take the Lights championship in its initial year, including a class win at the 24 Hours of Daytona. Acura and Comptech would take the Lights championships again in 1992 and 1993, as well as another Daytona class win in 1992 and a class win at the 12 Hours of Sebring for 1993. Comptech engines performed well in the 24 Hours of Daytona Race in the World Sportscar Class in 1994 and 1995.

During the open engine builder era in IndyCar, Comptech built engines for the following teams:

- Kelley Racing with drivers Scott Sharp and Mark Dismore
- Chip Ganassi Racing with drivers Juan Pablo Montoya, Bruno Junqueira, Jimmy Vasser, Tony Stewart, Jeff Ward and Kenny Bräck
- Rahal Letterman Racing with driver Jimmy Vasser
- Bradley Motorsports with driver Buzz Calkins
- Walker Racing with driver Sarah Fisher
- Treadway Racing with drivers Arie Luyendyk, Sam Schmidt, Robby McGehee, Jason Leffler and Rick Treadway

Comptech's Chief Executive Officer (CEO) is Frederick W. Penney. Its sister company, Penney Racing Supply was also the sole distributor of Goodyear Short Track tires in the United States until Goodyear discontinued these tires in 2013. Since then, Penney Racing Supply has been the exclusive West Coast wholesale distributor of American racing tires. They are also affiliated with Pacific Challenge Series . Patrick Dempsey recently raced in the Long Beach Grand Prix using a Comptech engine.

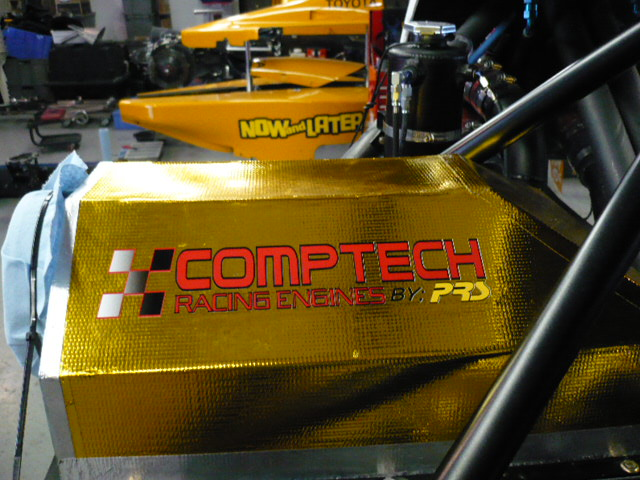
Comptech Honda V6

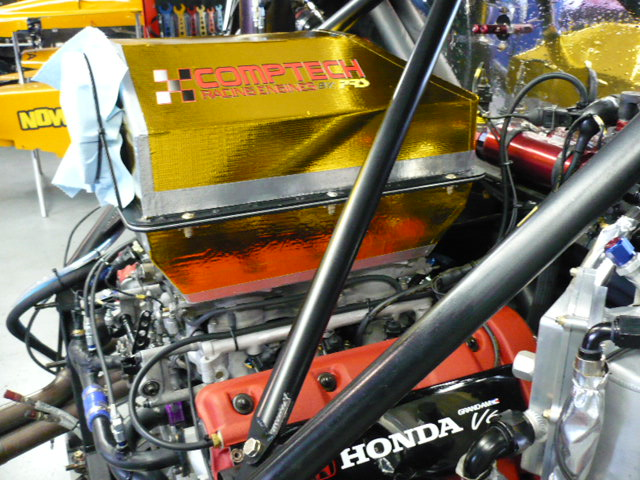
Comptech Honda Grand Am V6

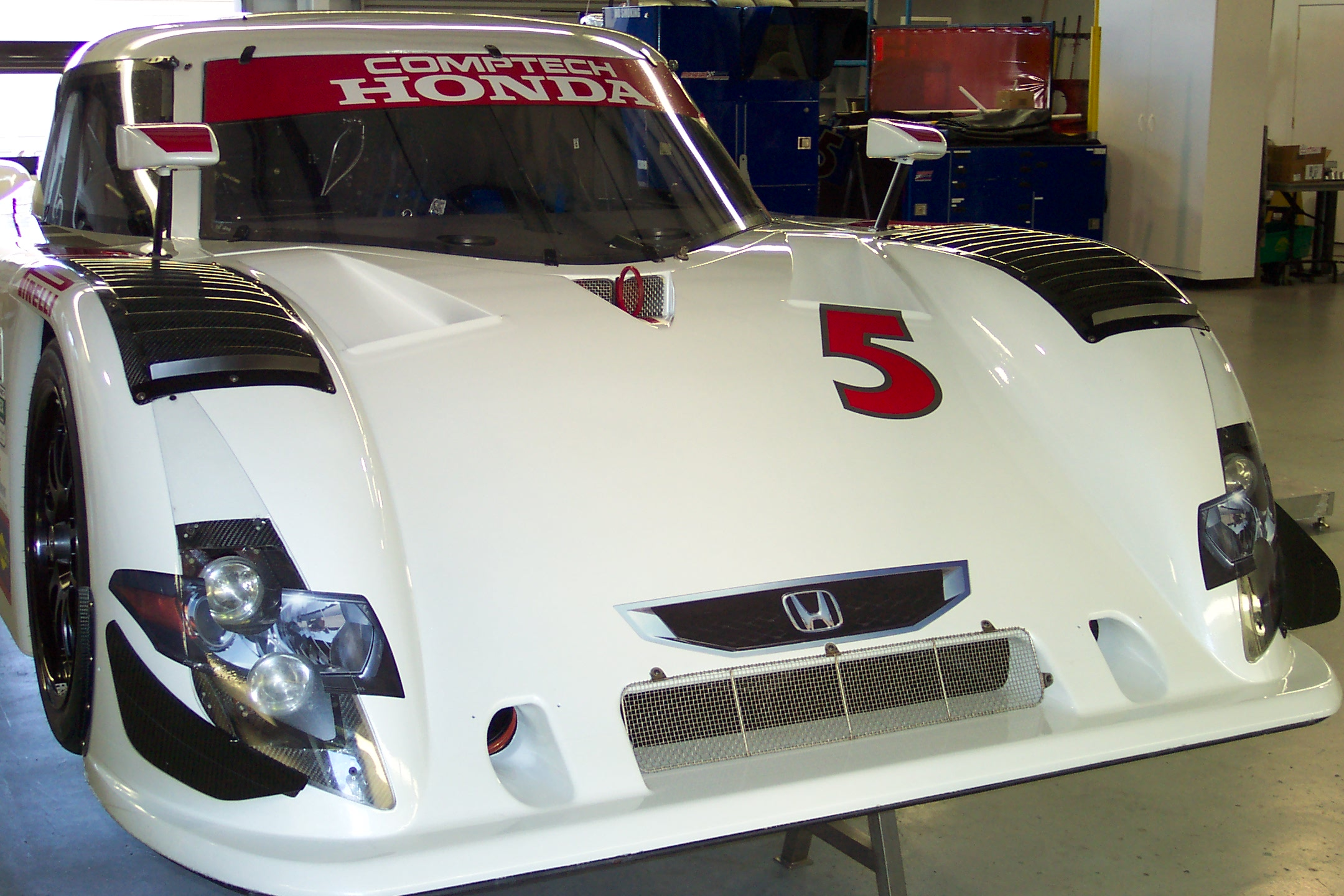
Comptech Honda NSX

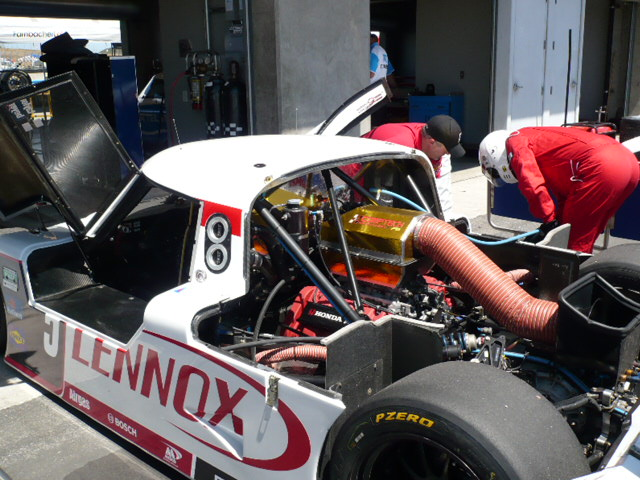
Comptech Honda NSX

== Sources ==
- Race Engine Technology; August 2008, Issue 32, page 56
- Racer, November 1993, page 36
- Modified Mag, SPEED World Challenge 2008 Fan Guide, page 8
- Hot Compact & Imports; April 2008, page 44
- SCCA Pro Racing, SPEED World Challenge, page 30
