= Rocky Moran =

American racing driver (1950–2024)

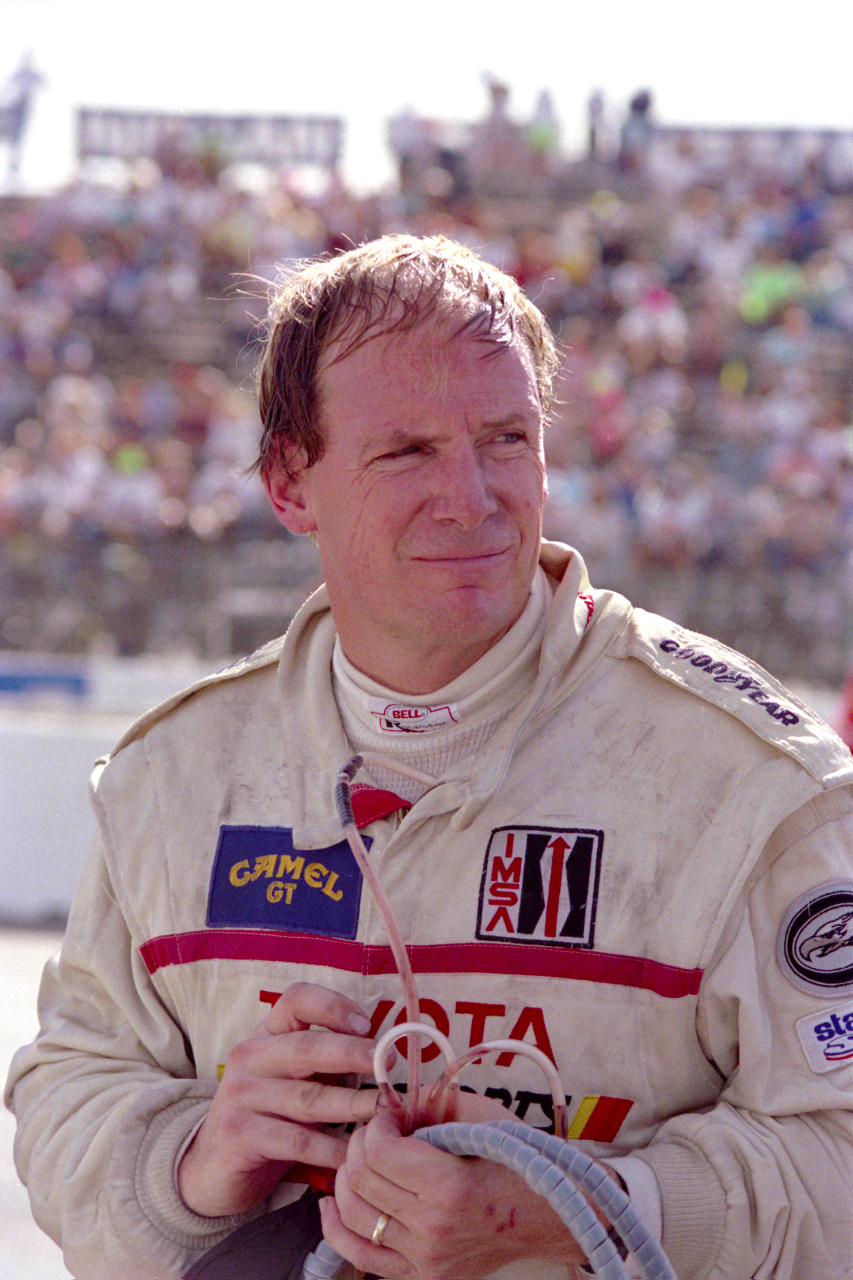
Moran at the 1990 IMSA Del Mar Grand Prix

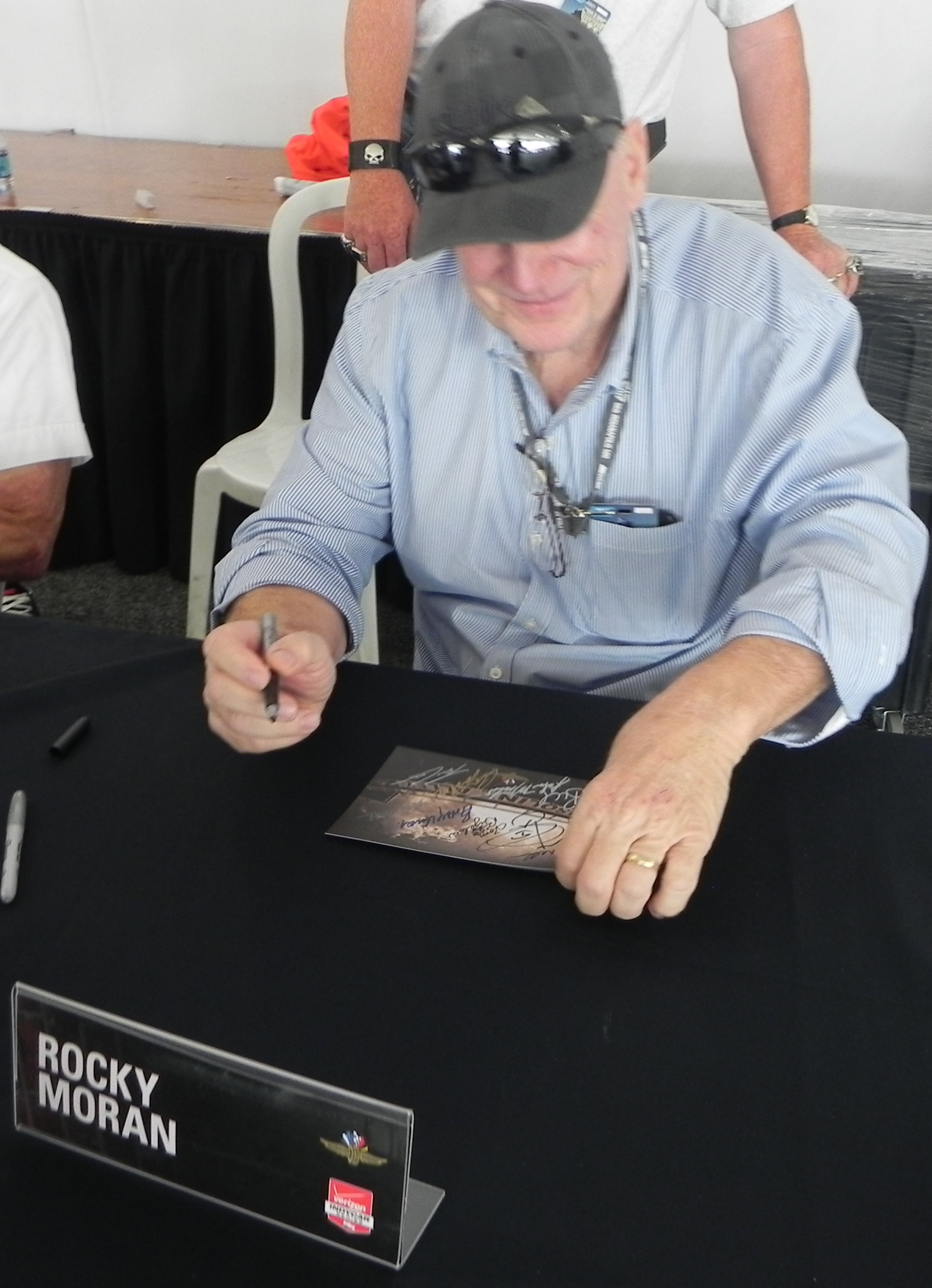
Moran at the 2014 Indianapolis 500.

William James Moran, known as Rocky Moran Sr. (February 3, 1950 – September 21, 2024), was an American auto racing driver who primarily drove in the CART Championship Car series. He competed during the 1981, 1985–1990 and 1992–1993 seasons, with 24 career starts, including three in the Indianapolis 500. He failed to qualify for the race on two other occasions and did not appear in 1994 despite being named to an entry. He had two top-ten finishes in CART, both sixth places: at Watkins Glen in 1981 and at Long Beach in 1988.

Moran also teamed up with P. J. Jones and Mark Dismore to win the 1993 24 Hours of Daytona event.

Moran was the father of racer Rocky Moran Jr., with whom he opened the Moran Raceway kart track in Beaumont, California, in June 2003. The track was 1 mile (1.6 km) long, had 19 turns, a 860-foot-long (260 m) straight, and a top speed by 125cc shifter karts of nearly 100 miles per hour (160 km/h). The track closed in 2007.

Moran died of cancer at the age of 74 on September 21, 2024 in Coto de Caza, California.

== American Open-Wheel racing results ==
=== PPG Indycar Series ===
(key) (Races in bold indicate pole position)

Year	Team	1	2	3	4	5	6	7	8	9	10	11	12	13	14	15	16	17	Rank	Points	Ref
1981	All American Racers	PHX	MIL	ATL	ATL	MCH	RIV	MIL	MCH	WGL; 6	MEX	PHX							**26th**	**16**	
1985	Leader Card Racing	LBH; 15	INDY	MIL	POR; DNQ	MEA; DNQ	CLE	MCH	ROA	POC	MDO	SAN	MCH	LAG	PHX	MIA			**45th**	**0**	
1986	Gohr Racing	PHX	LBH	INDY	MIL	POR	MEA; 13	CLE; 16	TOR	MCH	POC; 25	MDO; 25	SAN	MCH; DNQ	ROA; 21	LAG; 15	PHX; 21	MIA; 16	**36th**	**0**	
1987	Gohr Racing	LBH; 13	PHX																**39th**	**0**	
1987	Walther			INDY; DNQ	MIL	POR	MEA	CLE	TOR	MCH	POC	ROA	MDO	NAZ	LAG	MIA			**39th**	**0**	
1988	Gohr Racing	PHX	LBH; 6		MIL	POR; 13	CLE; 22	TOR; 12	MEA; 15	MCH	POC	MDO; 13	ROA; 17	NAZ	LAG; 28	MIA; 13			**25th**	**9**	
1988	A. J. Foyt Enterprises			INDY; 16															**25th**	**9**	
1989	Curb Racing	PHX	LBH	INDY; 14	MIL	DET	POR	CLE	MEA	TOR	MCH	POC	MDO	ROA	NAZ				**38th**	**0**	
1989	A. J. Foyt Enterprises															LAG; 28			**38th**	**0**	
1990	Gohr Racing	PHX	LBH	INDY; 25	MIL	DET	POR	CLE	MEA	TOR	MCH	DEN	VAN	MDO	ROA	NAZ	LAG		**43rd**	**0**	
1992	Menard Racing	SRF	PHX	LBH	INDY; DNQ	DET	POR	MIL	NHA	TOR	MCH	CLE	ROA	VAN	MDO	NAZ	LAG		NC	-	
1993	Team Losi	SRF	PHX	LBH	INDY; DNQ	MIL	DET	POR	CLE	TOR	MCH	NHA	ROA	VAN	MDO	NAZ	LAG		NC	-	
1994	Burns Adcox Motor Sports	SRF	PHX	LBH	INDY; Wth^{1}	MIL	DET	POR	CLE	TOR	MCH	MDO	NHA	VAN	ROA	NAZ	LAG		NC	-	

^{1} Did not appear
