= 1992 24 Hours of Daytona =

Previous: 1991	Next: 1993
Index: Races | Winners

Track map of Daytona International Speedway

The 1992 Rolex 24 at Daytona was a 24-hour endurance sports car race held on February 1–2, 1992 at the Daytona International Speedway road course. The race served as the opening round of the 1992 IMSA GT Championship.

Victory overall and in the LM class went to the No. 23 Nissan Motorsport International Nissan R91CP driven by Masahiro Hasemi, Kazuyoshi Hoshino, Toshio Suzuki. Victory in the GTP class went to the No. 2 Jaguar Racing Jaguar XJR-12 driven by Davy Jones, Scott Pruett, David Brabham, and Scott Goodyear. Victory in the Lights class went to the No. 49 Comptech Racing Spice SE91P driven by Parker Johnstone, Steve Cameron, Jimmy Vasser, and Dan Marvin. The GTS class was won by the No. 15 Roush Racing Ford Mustang driven by Dorsey Schroeder, Wally Dallenbach Jr., and Robby Gordon. Finally, the GTU class was won by the No. 82 Dick Greer Racing Mazda RX-7 driven by Al Bacon, Dick Greer, Mike Mees, and Peter Uria. Notably, the GTU class winner finished 7th overall, ahead of GTS class winner, one of the best finishes for a GTU entry during that era.

== Race results ==
Class winners in bold.

Pos	Class	No	Team	Drivers	Chassis	Tyre	Laps
Pos	Class	No	Team	Drivers	Engine	Tyre	Laps
1	**LM**	**23**	(Japan) **Nissan Motorsport International**	(Japan) **Masahiro Hasemi** (Japan) **Kazuyoshi Hoshino** (Japan) **Toshio Suzuki**	**Nissan R91CP**	G	**762**
1	**LM**	**23**	(Japan) **Nissan Motorsport International**	(Japan) **Masahiro Hasemi** (Japan) **Kazuyoshi Hoshino** (Japan) **Toshio Suzuki**	**Nissan 3.5L V8 Turbo**	G	**762**
2	**GTP**	**2**	(United Kingdom) **Jaguar Racing**	(United States) **Davy Jones** (United States) **Scott Pruett** (Australia) **David Brabham** (Canada) **Scott Goodyear**	**Jaguar XJR-12**	G	**753**
2	**GTP**	**2**	(United Kingdom) **Jaguar Racing**	(United States) **Davy Jones** (United States) **Scott Pruett** (Australia) **David Brabham** (Canada) **Scott Goodyear**	**Jaguar 6.5L V12 N/A**	G	**753**
3	GTP	52	(Australia) Team 0123	(Austria) Roland Ratzenberger (United States) Hurley Haywood (Sweden) Eje Elgh (United States) Scott Brayton	Porsche 962	G	749
3	GTP	52	(Australia) Team 0123	(Austria) Roland Ratzenberger (United States) Hurley Haywood (Sweden) Eje Elgh (United States) Scott Brayton	Porsche 3.0L Flat 6 Twin-Turbo	G	749
4	GTP	98	(United States) All American Racers	(United States) P. J. Jones (United States) Rocky Moran (United States) Mark Dismore	Eagle MkIII	G	739
4	GTP	98	(United States) All American Racers	(United States) P. J. Jones (United States) Rocky Moran (United States) Mark Dismore	Toyota 2.1L I4 Twin-Turbo	G	739
5	**Lights**	**49**	(United States) **Comptech Racing**	(United States) **Parker Johnstone** (United States) **Steve Cameron** (United States) **Jimmy Vasser** (United States) **Dan Marvin**	Spice SE91P	BF	**681**
5	**Lights**	**49**	(United States) **Comptech Racing**	(United States) **Parker Johnstone** (United States) **Steve Cameron** (United States) **Jimmy Vasser** (United States) **Dan Marvin**	**Acura 3.0L V6 N/A**	BF	**681**
6	Lights	44	(United States) Scandia Engineering	(Spain) Fermín Vélez (United States) Andy Evans (United States) Lon Bender (Germany) Dominic Dobson	Kudzu DG-1	G	654
6	Lights	44	(United States) Scandia Engineering	(Spain) Fermín Vélez (United States) Andy Evans (United States) Lon Bender (Germany) Dominic Dobson	Buick 3.4L V6 N/A	G	654
7	**GTU**	**82**	(United States) **Dick Greer Racing**	(United States) **Al Bacon** (United States) **Dick Greer** (United States) **Mike Mees** (United States) **Peter Uria**	**Mazda RX-7**	G	**636**
7	**GTU**	**82**	(United States) **Dick Greer Racing**	(United States) **Al Bacon** (United States) **Dick Greer** (United States) **Mike Mees** (United States) **Peter Uria**	**Mazda 1.3L 2 Rotor**	G	**636**
8	LM	27	(Japan) Nova Engineering	(Italy) Mauro Martini (Germany) Volker Weidler (United States) Jeff Krosnoff	Nissan R91CK	B	635
8	LM	27	(Japan) Nova Engineering	(Italy) Mauro Martini (Germany) Volker Weidler (United States) Jeff Krosnoff	Nissan 3.5L V8 Twin-Turbo	B	635
9 DNF	**GTS**	**15**	(United States) **Roush Racing**	(United States) **Dorsey Schroeder** (United States) **Wally Dallenbach Jr.** (United States) **Robby Gordon**	**Ford Mustang**	G	**614**
9 DNF	**GTS**	**15**	(United States) **Roush Racing**	(United States) **Dorsey Schroeder** (United States) **Wally Dallenbach Jr.** (United States) **Robby Gordon**	**Ford 6.0L V8 N/A**	G	**614**
10	GTS	51	(United States) Rocketsports Racing	(United States) Jeff Kline (United States) George Robinson (United States) Darin Brassfield (United States) Paul Gentilozzi	Oldsmobile Cutlass	BF	590
10	GTS	51	(United States) Rocketsports Racing	(United States) Jeff Kline (United States) George Robinson (United States) Darin Brassfield (United States) Paul Gentilozzi	Oldsmobile 6.0L V8 N/A	BF	590
11	GTP	99	(United States) All American Racers	(Argentina) Juan Manuel Fangio II (United Kingdom) Andy Wallace (United Kingdom) Kenny Acheson	Eagle MkIII	G	584
11	GTP	99	(United States) All American Racers	(Argentina) Juan Manuel Fangio II (United Kingdom) Andy Wallace (United Kingdom) Kenny Acheson	Toyota 2.1L I4 Twin-Turbo	G	584
12	GTU	24	Alberti Motorsports Team Peru	(Peru) Juan Dibos (Peru) Eduardo Dibós Chappuis (Peru) Raúl Orlandini	Mazda MX-6	G	573
12	GTU	24	Alberti Motorsports Team Peru	(Peru) Juan Dibos (Peru) Eduardo Dibós Chappuis (Peru) Raúl Orlandini	Mazda 1.3L 2 Rotor	G	573
13	GTU	95	(United States) Leitzinger Racing	(United States) Chuck Kurtz (United States) Bob Leitzinger (United States) David Loring	Nissan 240SX	T	566
13	GTU	95	(United States) Leitzinger Racing	(United States) Chuck Kurtz (United States) Bob Leitzinger (United States) David Loring	Nissan 3.0L V6 N/A	T	566
14	GTS	11	(United States) Roush Racing	(United States) Mark Martin (United States) Jim Stevens (United States) Robbie Buhl (United Kingdom) Calvin Fish	Ford Mustang	G	539
14	GTS	11	(United States) Roush Racing	(United States) Mark Martin (United States) Jim Stevens (United States) Robbie Buhl (United Kingdom) Calvin Fish	Ford 6.0L V8 N/A	G	539
15	GTU	96	(United States) Leitzinger Racing	(United States) Don Knowles (United States) David Loring (United States) Chuck Kurtz (United States) Dan Robson	Nissan 240SX	T	538
15	GTU	96	(United States) Leitzinger Racing	(United States) Don Knowles (United States) David Loring (United States) Chuck Kurtz (United States) Dan Robson	Nissan 3.0L V6 N/A	T	538
16	GTS	75	(United States) Cunningham Racing	(United States) John Morton (Canada) Jeremy Dale (United States) Johnny O'Connell	Nissan 300ZX Turbo	Y	531
16	GTS	75	(United States) Cunningham Racing	(United States) John Morton (Canada) Jeremy Dale (United States) Johnny O'Connell	Nissan 3.0L V6 Twin-Turbo	Y	531
17	GTS	50	(United States) Overbagh Racing	(United States) Oma Kimbrough (United States) Mark Montgomery (United States) Robert McElheny (United States) Gary Swanander (United States) Jon Lewis (Puerto Rico) Raan Rodriguez (United States) Hoyt Overbagh	Chevrolet Camaro	G	529
17	GTS	50	(United States) Overbagh Racing	(United States) Oma Kimbrough (United States) Mark Montgomery (United States) Robert McElheny (United States) Gary Swanander (United States) Jon Lewis (Puerto Rico) Raan Rodriguez (United States) Hoyt Overbagh	Chevrolet 6.1L V8 N/A	G	529
18	GTU	26	(United States) Alex Job Racing	(United States) Joe Pezza (United States) Alex Padilla (United Kingdom) John Sheldon (United States) Jack Refenning	Porsche 911	G	506
18	GTU	26	(United States) Alex Job Racing	(United States) Joe Pezza (United States) Alex Padilla (United Kingdom) John Sheldon (United States) Jack Refenning	Porsche 3.2L Flat 6 N/A	G	506
19 DNF	GTP	30	(Germany) Joest Racing	(Germany) Hans-Joachim Stuck (Germany) Frank Jelinski (Italy) Giampiero Moretti (France) Henri Pescarolo	Porsche 962	Y	503
19 DNF	GTP	30	(Germany) Joest Racing	(Germany) Hans-Joachim Stuck (Germany) Frank Jelinski (Italy) Giampiero Moretti (France) Henri Pescarolo	Porsche 3.0L Flat 6 Twin-Turbo	Y	503
20	GTU	0	(United States) Full Time Racing	(United States) John Fergus (United States) Bobby Akin (United States) Neil Hanneman	Dodge Daytona	Y	471
20	GTU	0	(United States) Full Time Racing	(United States) John Fergus (United States) Bobby Akin (United States) Neil Hanneman	Dodge 2.4L I4 N/A	Y	471
21 DNF	GTU	37	(Colombia) Botero Racing Team	(New Zealand) Rob Wilson (Colombia) Lucio Bernal (Colombia) Felipe Solano (Cuba) Miguel Morejon	Mazda MX-6	Y	465
21 DNF	GTU	37	(Colombia) Botero Racing Team	(New Zealand) Rob Wilson (Colombia) Lucio Bernal (Colombia) Felipe Solano (Cuba) Miguel Morejon	Mazda 1.3L 2 Rotor	Y	465
22 DNF	GTS	21	(United States) Kent Painter	(United States) Robert Kahn (United States) John Annis (United States) John Macaluso (United States) Robert Borders	Chevrolet Camaro	H	465
22 DNF	GTS	21	(United States) Kent Painter	(United States) Robert Kahn (United States) John Annis (United States) John Macaluso (United States) Robert Borders	Chevrolet 5.5L V8 N/A	H	465
23	GTU	72	(United States) Kjoller Motorsport	(United States) Steve Volk (United States) Robin Boone (United States) Jay Kjoller	Porsche 911	G	432
23	GTU	72	(United States) Kjoller Motorsport	(United States) Steve Volk (United States) Robin Boone (United States) Jay Kjoller	Porsche 3.2L Flat 6 N/A	G	432
24 DNF	Lights	36	(United States) Downing/Atlanta Racing	(United States) Howard Katz (United States) John Grooms (United States) Jim Downing (United States) Frank Jellinek	Kudzu DG-1	G	426
24 DNF	Lights	36	(United States) Downing/Atlanta Racing	(United States) Howard Katz (United States) John Grooms (United States) Jim Downing (United States) Frank Jellinek	Mazda 1.3L 2 Rotor	G	426
25	GTS	67	(United States) Mazkar Racing	(United States) Steve Burgner (Argentina) Paul Mazzacane (United States) Henry Brosnaham (United States) Bobby Scolo	Chevrolet Camaro	G	389
25	GTS	67	(United States) Mazkar Racing	(United States) Steve Burgner (Argentina) Paul Mazzacane (United States) Henry Brosnaham (United States) Bobby Scolo	Chevrolet 5.5L V8 N/A	G	389
26 DNF	LM	13	(France) Courage Compétition	(France) Pascal Fabre (France) Lionel Robert (France) Bob Wollek	Courage C82S	G	387
26 DNF	LM	13	(France) Courage Compétition	(France) Pascal Fabre (France) Lionel Robert (France) Bob Wollek	Porsche 3.0L Flat 6 Twin-Turbo	G	387
27 DNF	Lights	33	(Canada) Bieri Racing	(Canada) Uli Bieri (Switzerland) Heinz Wirth (Canada) Vito Scavone (United Kingdom) Andrew Hepworth	Tiga GT287	G	349
27 DNF	Lights	33	(Canada) Bieri Racing	(Canada) Uli Bieri (Switzerland) Heinz Wirth (Canada) Vito Scavone (United Kingdom) Andrew Hepworth	Ferrari 3.0L V8 N/A	G	349
28	GTU	57	(United States) Kryderacing	(United States) Frank Del Vecchio (United States) Joe Danaher (United States) Mark Kent (United States) Bill Sargis (United States) Reed Kryder	Nissan 240SX	G	345
28	GTU	57	(United States) Kryderacing	(United States) Frank Del Vecchio (United States) Joe Danaher (United States) Mark Kent (United States) Bill Sargis (United States) Reed Kryder	Nissan 3.0L V6 N/A	G	345
29 DNF	GTP	7	(Germany) Joest Racing	(Germany) Bernd Schneider (Italy) Massimo Sigala (Argentina) Oscar Larrauri (Germany) "John Winter"	Porsche 962	G	327
29 DNF	GTP	7	(Germany) Joest Racing	(Germany) Bernd Schneider (Italy) Massimo Sigala (Argentina) Oscar Larrauri (Germany) "John Winter"	Porsche 3.0L Flat 6 Twin-Turbo	G	327
30	GTU	58	(United States) Maria Shalala	(United States) Tim McAdam (Canada) Charles Monk (United States) Sam Shalala (United States) Andre Toennis (United States) Dan Pastorini	Porsche 911	G	313
30	GTU	58	(United States) Maria Shalala	(United States) Tim McAdam (Canada) Charles Monk (United States) Sam Shalala (United States) Andre Toennis (United States) Dan Pastorini	Porsche 3.2L Flat 6 N/A	G	313
31 DNF	GTS	41	(United States) Rocketsports Racing	(United States) Jack Baldwin (United States) Irv Hoerr (United States) Paul Gentilozzi	Oldsmobile Cutlass	BF	312
31 DNF	GTS	41	(United States) Rocketsports Racing	(United States) Jack Baldwin (United States) Irv Hoerr (United States) Paul Gentilozzi	Oldsmobile 6.5L V8 N/A	BF	312
32 DNF	GTS	25	(United States) Dale Kreider	(United States) Bill Adams (United States) John Duke (United States) Jon Gooding (United States) Dale Kreider	Oldsmobile Cutlass	G	289
32 DNF	GTS	25	(United States) Dale Kreider	(United States) Bill Adams (United States) John Duke (United States) Jon Gooding (United States) Dale Kreider	Oldsmobile 6.0L V8 N/A	G	289
33 DNF	Lights	6	(United States) MAB Racing	(United States) Ronald Zitza (United States) Rob Robertson (United States) Mel Butt (United States) Tommy Johnson	Tiga GT287	G	279
33 DNF	Lights	6	(United States) MAB Racing	(United States) Ronald Zitza (United States) Rob Robertson (United States) Mel Butt (United States) Tommy Johnson	Buick 3.0L V6 N/A	G	279
34 DNF	GTP	83T	(United States) Nissan Performance Technology	(Australia) Geoff Brabham (United States) Chip Robinson (Netherlands) Arie Luyendyk (United States) Bob Earl	Nissan R90CK	G	272
34 DNF	GTP	83T	(United States) Nissan Performance Technology	(Australia) Geoff Brabham (United States) Chip Robinson (Netherlands) Arie Luyendyk (United States) Bob Earl	Nissan 3.0L V8 Turbo	G	272
35 DNF	GTP	12	(France) Courage Compétition	(France) François Migault (Canada) David Tennyson (Mexico) Tomas Lopez	Courage C28S	G	220
35 DNF	GTP	12	(France) Courage Compétition	(France) François Migault (Canada) David Tennyson (Mexico) Tomas Lopez	Porsche 3.0L Flat 6 Twin-Turbo	G	220
36 DNF	GTU	05	(United States) Support Net Racing	(United States) Henry Camferdam (United States) Phil Krueger (United States) Gary Drummond	Mazda MX-6	G	214
36 DNF	GTU	05	(United States) Support Net Racing	(United States) Henry Camferdam (United States) Phil Krueger (United States) Gary Drummond	Mazda 1.3L 2 Rotor	G	214
37 DNF	GTP	4	(United States) Tom Milner Racing	(South Africa) Wayne Taylor (United States) Jeff Purner (United States) Hugh Fuller (Japan) Hideshi Matsuda	Spice SE89P	G	213
37 DNF	GTP	4	(United States) Tom Milner Racing	(South Africa) Wayne Taylor (United States) Jeff Purner (United States) Hugh Fuller (Japan) Hideshi Matsuda	Chevrolet 6.3L V8 N/A	G	213
38	GTS	35	(United States) Bill McDill	(United States) Richard McDill (United States) Chris Schneider (United States) Bill McDill (United States) Tom Juckette	Chevrolet Camaro	Y	204
38	GTS	35	(United States) Bill McDill	(United States) Richard McDill (United States) Chris Schneider (United States) Bill McDill (United States) Tom Juckette	Chevrolet 6.1L V8 N/A	Y	204
39 DNF	GTU	69	(United States) North Coast Racing	(United States) Brad Hoyt (United States) Andy Pilgrim (United States) John Petrick (United States) Don Wallace	Mazda RX-7	G	195
39 DNF	GTU	69	(United States) North Coast Racing	(United States) Brad Hoyt (United States) Andy Pilgrim (United States) John Petrick (United States) Don Wallace	Mazda 1.3L 2 Rotor	G	195
40 DNF	Lights	48	(United States) Comptech Racing	(Japan) Kazuo Shimizu (Italy) Ruggero Melgrati (United States) Bob Lesnett (Greece) Costas Los (United States) Steve Cameron (United States) Doug Peterson	Spice SE90P	BF	168
40 DNF	Lights	48	(United States) Comptech Racing	(Japan) Kazuo Shimizu (Italy) Ruggero Melgrati (United States) Bob Lesnett (Greece) Costas Los (United States) Steve Cameron (United States) Doug Peterson	Acura 3.0L V6 N/A	BF	168
41 DNF	GTP	84	(United States) Nissan Performance Technology	(Republic of Ireland) Derek Daly (New Zealand) Steve Millen (Australia) Gary Brabham	Nissan R90CK	G	150
41 DNF	GTP	84	(United States) Nissan Performance Technology	(Republic of Ireland) Derek Daly (New Zealand) Steve Millen (Australia) Gary Brabham	Nissan 3.0L V8 Turbo	G	150
42 DNF	GTS	76	(United States) Cunningham Racing	(United States) Johnny O'Connell (United States) John Morton (Canada) Jeremy Dale	Nissan 300ZX Turbo	Y	144
42 DNF	GTS	76	(United States) Cunningham Racing	(United States) Johnny O'Connell (United States) John Morton (Canada) Jeremy Dale	Nissan 3.0L V6 Twin-Turbo	Y	144
43 DNF	Lights	9	(United States) Essex Racing Service	(United States) Charles Morgan (United States) Jim Pace (United States) Ken Knott	Kudzu DG-1	G	129
43 DNF	Lights	9	(United States) Essex Racing Service	(United States) Charles Morgan (United States) Jim Pace (United States) Ken Knott	Buick 3.0L V6 N/A	G	129
44 DNF	Lights	17	(United States) Carlos Bobeda Racing	(United States) Kaming Ko (United States) Ken Parschauer (United States) Carlos Bobeda	Spice SE90P	G	125
44 DNF	Lights	17	(United States) Carlos Bobeda Racing	(United States) Kaming Ko (United States) Ken Parschauer (United States) Carlos Bobeda	Buick 3.4L V6 N/A	G	125
45 DNF	GTU	73	(United States) Jack Lewis Enterprises Ltd.	(United States) Jack Lewis (United States) Bill Ferran (United States) Taylor Robertson	Porsche 911 Carrera RSR	H	115
45 DNF	GTU	73	(United States) Jack Lewis Enterprises Ltd.	(United States) Jack Lewis (United States) Bill Ferran (United States) Taylor Robertson	Porsche 3.2L Flat 6 N/A	H	115
46 DNF	GTU	55	(United States) Bob Schader	(United States) Bob Schader (United States) Phil Mahre (United States) Steve Mahre (United States) John Finger	Mazda MX-6	Y	94
46 DNF	GTU	55	(United States) Bob Schader	(United States) Bob Schader (United States) Phil Mahre (United States) Steve Mahre (United States) John Finger	Mazda 1.3L 2 Rotor	Y	94
47 DNF	GTU	71	(United States) Oldsmobile Motorsports	(United States) Amos Johnson (United States) Scott Hoerr (United States) Dennis Shaw	Oldsmobile Achieva	BF	89
47 DNF	GTU	71	(United States) Oldsmobile Motorsports	(United States) Amos Johnson (United States) Scott Hoerr (United States) Dennis Shaw	Oldsmobile 2.3L I4 N/A	BF	89
48 DNF	Lights	40	(Canada) Bieri Racing	(United States) Johnny Unser (Canada) John Graham (United Kingdom) Andrew Hepworth (Canada) Uli Bieri	Alba AR20	G	47
48 DNF	Lights	40	(Canada) Bieri Racing	(United States) Johnny Unser (Canada) John Graham (United Kingdom) Andrew Hepworth (Canada) Uli Bieri	Ford 3.0L V6 N/A	G	47
49 DNF	GTS	22	(United States) J&B Motorsports	(United States) Luis Sereix (United States) Daniel Urrutia (Argentina) Jorge Polanco	Chevrolet Camaro	G	32
49 DNF	GTS	22	(United States) J&B Motorsports	(United States) Luis Sereix (United States) Daniel Urrutia (Argentina) Jorge Polanco	Chevrolet 5.7L V8 N/A	G	32
DNS	GTP	3	(United Kingdom) Jaguar Racing	(United States) Davy Jones (Canada) Scott Goodyear (Australia) David Brabham (United States) Scott Pruett	Jaguar XJR-16	G	-
DNS	GTP	3	(United Kingdom) Jaguar Racing	(United States) Davy Jones (Canada) Scott Goodyear (Australia) David Brabham (United States) Scott Pruett	Jaguar 3.0L V6 Twin-Turbo	G	-
DNS	GTP	83		(Australia) Geoff Brabham (United States) Chip Robinson (Netherlands) Arie Luyendyk	Nissan R90CK	G	-
DNS	GTP	83		(Australia) Geoff Brabham (United States) Chip Robinson (Netherlands) Arie Luyendyk	Nissan 3.0L V8 Turbo	G	-
