= Atlanta Motor Speedway =

Motorsport track in the United States

EchoPark Speedway
- Circuit logo (June 2025–present)

- Quad-oval (1997–present)
- Location: Hampton, Georgia, United States
- Coordinates: 33°23′0.58″N 84°19′4.28″W
- Capacity: 71,000
- Owner: Speedway Motorsports (1990–present)
- Broke ground: 17 September 1958; 68 years ago
- Opened: 25 July 1960; 66 years ago
- Construction cost: US$1.8 million
- Former names: Atlanta International Raceway (1960 – October 1990); Atlanta Motor Speedway (October 1990 – May 2025)
- Major events: Current: NASCAR Cup Series; Autotrader 400 (1960–present); Dollar Tree 400 (1960–2010, 2021–present); The Winston (1986); NASCAR O'Reilly Auto Parts Series; Bennett Transportation & Logistics 250 (1992–present); Focused Health 250 (2021–2026); NASCAR Truck Series; Fr8 208 (2004–2012, 2015–present); TBA (2005–2008, 2027); INEX; Thursday Thunder (1998–present); Former: Indy Racing League; Atlanta 500 Classic (1965–1966, 1978–1979, 1981–1983, 1998–2001); IMSA GT Championship; Grand Prix of Atlanta (1993); IROC (1979–1980, 2004–2006); ARCA Re/Max Series (1984–2003); AMA Superbike Championship (1993–1994)
- Website: www.echoparkspeedway.com

Quad-oval (2022–present)
- Length: 1.540 mi (2.478 km)
- Banking: Turns: 28° Straights: 5°
- Race lap record: 0:29.361 ( (United States) Josh Berry, Ford Mustang GT, 2024, NASCAR)

Quad-oval (1997–2021)
- Length: 1.540 mi (2.478 km)
- Banking: Turns: 24° Straights: 5°
- Race lap record: 0:24.732 (224.163 mph) ( (United States) Billy Boat, Dallara IR-7, 1998, IRL)

Oval (1960–1996)
- Length: 1.522 mi (2.449 km)
- Banking: Turns: 24° Straights: 5°

Road course (1992–1996)
- Length: 2.522 mi (4.059 km)
- Race lap record: 1:13.514 ( (Argentina) Juan Manuel Fangio II, Eagle Mk III, 1993, IMSA GTP)

Atlanta Motor Speedway (currently known as EchoPark Speedway for sponsorship reasons; formerly the Atlanta International Raceway from 1960 to 1990) is a 1.540 mi (2.478 km) quad-oval intermediate speedway in Hampton, Georgia, United States. The track has hosted a variety of sanctioning bodies since its inaugural season of racing in 1960, including NASCAR and IndyCar. The venue has a capacity of 71,000 as of 2015 and includes various track layouts, including a 0.250 mi (0.402 km) oval on the track's frontstretch, and a 2.522 mi (4.059 km) roval road course layout. Atlanta Motor Speedway is currently owned by Speedway Motorsports, LLC (SMI) and is led by track general manager Brandon Hutchison.

In the late 1950s, plans were made by the First Georgia Securities Corporation to build a facility that rivaled the Indianapolis Motor Speedway. After a months-long delay, the first races were held in 1960. Shortly after, the track faced heavy financial troubles, having to enter Chapter 10 bankruptcy in 1971. After periods of stability directed by Stacey Cotton and Walt Nix, the facility was bought out by motorsports mogul Bruton Smith in 1990, with Smith and his company, SMI, directing the facility's expansion and renovation under longtime general manager Ed Clark. The track has since gone through two major reconfigurations since Smith's purchase: one in 1997 that changed the layout of the track, and one in 2021 that changed the style of racing to produce pack racing seen at superspeedways.

== Description ==
=== Configurations ===
The track in its current form is measured at 1.540 mi (2.478 km), with 28 degrees of banking in the turns and five degrees of banking in the straightaways. The racing surface width varies, with a recorded 52 feet on the frontstretch, 42 feet on the backstretch, and 40 feet in the turns. From 1997 to 2021, the racing surface was at a recorded 55 feet with 24 degrees of banking in the turns. When the track first opened as a true oval, it was advertised to be banked at 24 degrees in the turns, with the straightaways being "banked slightly".

In 1992, developers added a 2.522 mi (4.059 km) road course layout that combined the main oval with a specialized infield portion to create a "roval". As part of the 1997 reconfiguration, developers added a 0.250 mi (0.402 km) oval on the track's frontstretch to accommodate legends car racing.

=== Amenities ===
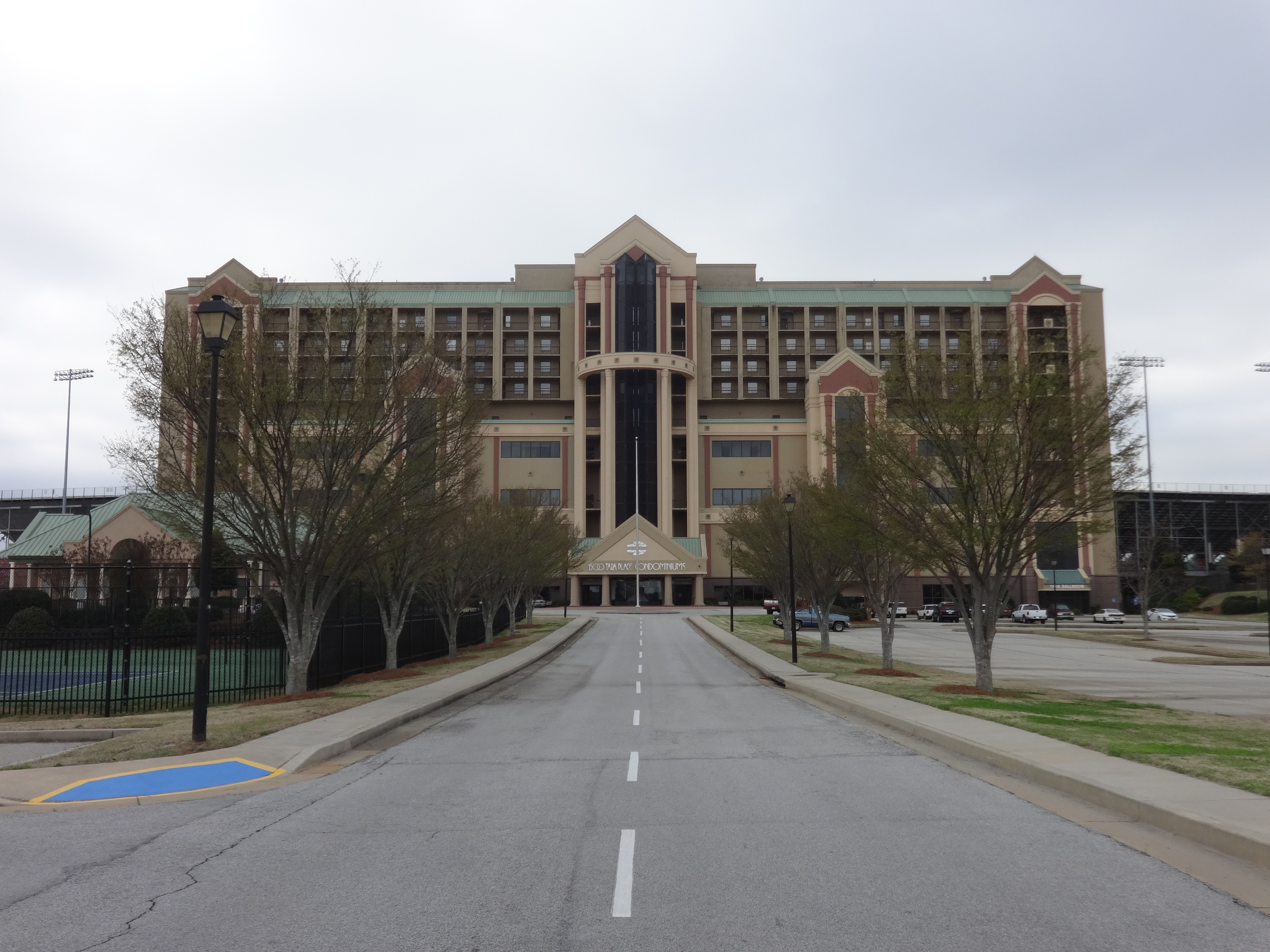
The Tara Place condominium complex (pictured in 2015)

Atlanta Motor Speedway is next to the concurrent U.S. Route 41 and U.S. Route 19, along with Georgia State Route 20. As of 2015, the track had a reported capacity of 71,000, with recent estimates being unknown due to the track's parent company, SMI, refusing to release capacity statistics as late as 2021. At its peak, the facility held a maximum of 124,000 according to a 2010 report by the Atlanta Magazine. The track complex also features a nine-story condominium complex called Tara Place. It was completed in 1994 and features 46 units along with a ballroom. In total, the facility covers around 850 acres of land.

== Track history ==
=== Planning and construction ===
On April 8, 1958, The Atlanta Constitution reported that the First Georgia Securities Corporation, led by president Richard W. King, announced plans to build a $1 million (adjusted for inflation$, 11,159,170), 50,000-seat, 400-acre racing facility 20 miles (32 km) south of Atlanta along a location near U.S. Route 41. Atlanta International Raceway, Inc. (AIR) was formed to head the project. Two months later, King and racing promoter of the nearby Lakewood Speedway, Carl Queen, opened a stock sale to the general public, with 479,550 shares being offered at $4 each; along with the announcement, the duo stated hopes of hosting NASCAR and United States Auto Club (USAC)-sanctioned races. King later stated hopes of expanding the facility's uses to include "almost any conceivable outdoor show", with developers hoping to host four major races annually. With the announcements, it was slated to become the second-biggest racing facility in the United States at the time, only behind the Indianapolis Motor Speedway.

The stock sale stagnated, with only $40,000 worth of shares being sold by the end of July. In August, drivers Curtis Turner and Joe Weatherly were announced by King as racing directors within the track's leadership, replacing Queen and Ernie Troutman, whose stock in the company was bought by track directors. With Queen sacked, he and King entered into a dispute over future race dates between Lakewood Speedway and Atlanta International Raceway, with both stating that they weren't willing to give up dates if they happened to run races on the same day. Groundbreaking occurred on September 17 at 1 PM EST, with King stating plans to host the first races at the facility "sometime in 1959"; actual work on the facility, however, did not start until late November.

==== Delays and postponements ====
By February 1959, Turner and Weatherly both threatened to resign from their positions and file lawsuits against the company, with Weatherly stating that they did not pay them enough for stock sold at meetings, a claim which King refuted. In addition, Weatherly claimed that he only hired to promote and did not want to be involved with selling stock, but was later forced to; he also implied that the financial situation and opening date of the track was unstable, stating, "They painted us a pretty picture... that picture isn't so pretty anymore". Four months later, although stock sales saw further stagnation, the project was able to secure a $400,000 loan, with King claiming that construction progressed enough that construction crews started building the grandstands. The number of flagship races for the track later decreased to three.

A NASCAR-sanctioned race for November 22, 1959, was set in late August, with NASCAR executive director Pat Purcell stating that he thought that the facility would be completed within the next 60 days. In its USAC ventures, however, Indianapolis Motor Speedway superintendent Clarence Cagle recommended changes to the track to increase safety for it to have a better chance at receiving a USAC date. Construction hit its first snag when road building was delayed due to fears of explosive hazards in August. In October, 20 days of rain plagued the track's construction, with construction being left half complete. As a result, track leaders decided to postpone the race, hoping to reschedule it in December or January 1960. The race was eventually postponed to March 27, the same day as a major race for Lakewood Speedway; however, with the track still being constructed by February, leaders opted to postpone the race indefinitely.

Four months later, Art Lester replaced King as president of the facility after he obtained over $1 million in financial aid. In addition, the track was able to reschedule the NASCAR race for a July 31 date along with the addition of another unscheduled NASCAR race within the year, signing a $636,000 contract with the E. Jack Smith Construction Company to build the remainder of the track. USAC, despite encouraging words from USAC director of competition Henry Banks, reportedly refused to race at the facility unless "changes are made in the banking of the track", with USAC claiming they found "one dip especially awkward". By the end of June, while NASCAR founder Bill France Sr. was confident that the track would be ready for racing by July 31, he stated that developers had "a heck of a lot of work to do". On July 3, Furman Bisher, a writer for The Atlanta Journal, remarked that while he was able to confirm that the facility would open on time, he wrote that the facility had only built "necessary conveniences", had cost $1.8 million, and that most of its original leadership abandoned the project by its completion.

=== First years ===
The first tests on the facility were run by Jack Smith on July 10, with Smith being told to sandbag the session. The facility officially opened to teams on July 25 for pre-race activities for the 1960 Dixie 300; however, the track saw immediate problems. Purcell ordered the fixing of a seven-foot flaw "between the straightaway and the pits" the same day, where no protective guardrails were installed. Rain plagued the track on the 28th, with "a bad bump in the middle groove of the first turn" being reported by drivers. To run the race, track executive Alf Lester hired 17 high school football players for a week. The race itself did not produce any major problems in the track, with a crowd of 25,000 witnessing Edwin "Fireball" Roberts winning the inaugural race. The victory was disputed by numerous drivers, most notably runner-up Cotton Owens who accused NASCAR officials of a scoring error. Bisher later criticized the facility, stating that "[nothing] was ready, there was dirt everywhere. It was like a county fair in the boondocks". Two weeks later, another annual NASCAR-sanctioned race, the Atlanta 500, was confirmed to be run in late October.

On the same day, an attempt to overthrow Lester by an opposing stockholder group led by T. Walker Jackson and A. E. Deermont was formed because they felt that "Lester is not doing a good job". Lester, who was facing his second attempt to overthrow him during his tenure, angrily stated that if he was overthrown, leadership would have to pay off an insurmountable $562,000 mortgage payment. A vote was scheduled for September 10, with Jackson claiming that their group had enough votes to sack Lester, unlike the first attempt. A lawsuit was filed on September 1 by 15 stockholders who supported Lester against five opposing stockholders who claimed that they wanted to hold a special stockholders' meeting to oust the current leadership, leading to the "endanger[ment of] the corporation's financial structure". A second lawsuit, filed by director I. C. Mitchell for libel, was made nine days later against Deermont and four other stockholders that claimed his reputation was damaged in a letter sent to 800 stockholders, which allegedly stated that Mitchell stole $100,000 in gate revenue. Although Lester was able to garner enough support by election day to retain the current administration, he decided to resign from his position, handing it to Nelson Weaver.

Renovations were steadily made during the first years. A guardrail was eventually installed by late October in time for the 1960 Atlanta 500, but parts of the track still remained unpaved. A new scoreboard, touted as the "world's most modern" by The Atlanta Journal, was installed nearly two years later. By mid-1963, after further renovations, Weaver announced that the facility was able to make $179,046 (adjusted for inflation$, 1,882,902) in profit for the year, displaying financial success. In 1965, Weaver announced preliminary plans to build a $500,000 dragstrip. In 1967, rumors about the potential sale of AIR to various prospective buyers were reported, including driver and businessman Curtis Turner and then-Atlanta Braves owner William Bartholomay. Weaver later died on February 16, 1968. The day before his death, Weaver appointed Jack Black to replace his position as president of AIR.

=== American Raceways merger, financial troubles ===
Throughout the facility's first few years, most of its NASCAR-sanctioned races were plagued by rain delays, leading to financial troubles. In addition, according to Macon News writer John Krueger, AIR leadership was plagued by "power struggles for several years" along with "too many chiefs and not enough Indians". NASCAR personalities, including Junior Johnson and Buddy Arrington, also stated displeasure with the facility, with a poor track surface, heavy mismanagement, and traffic concerns being key issues. Before Weaver died, he used his own finances to keep the track afloat; the stability went away after his death. Under Black's leadership, in December 1968, AIR merged with the Lawrence LoPatin-owned Michigan International Speedway, which was built in the same year. With the deal, AIR announced an investment of $1 million worth of renovations for the facility, which covered a repave, a new dragstrip, seating expansion, and amenity improvements. The merger was approved by the U.S. Securities and Exchange Commission (SEC) in March 1969.

By late 1969, after LoPatin expanded the company and a rebranded it to American Raceways, the company fell into financial trouble after their director of operations, Les Richter, left the company. In response, American Raceways merged with the STP Corporation. The next year, AIR directors attempted to stop LoPatin from purchasing controlling interest of the facility; by this point, LoPatin was seen as a self-centered dictator who had virtually no practical experience with racing within local Atlanta media. In June, AIR directors initiated plans to sever ties from American Raceways after numerous executives, including Black, were removed from active roles or resigned due to LoPatin's leadership and the company's financial troubles. However, by mid-July, American Raceways was able to purchase complete control over AIR. LoPatin was reportedly ousted shortly after from his position, with Charlotte Motor Speedway president Richard Howard deciding to assist the track so it could run the 1970 Dixie 500. Furman Bisher later recalled, "it was run like a 10-year-old boy would run a candy store. People who knew nothing about racing were trying to run races. Stockholders who knew nothing about a race track were trying to tell people who did how a race track ought to be run."

By the running of the Dixie 500 in August, American Raceways oversaw numerous major executive changes. The race itself was under threat of being cancelled when the Internal Revenue Service (IRS) demanded they pay $35,000 as a partial payment on their delinquent taxes, which totaled over $58,000. As part of a last-ditch effort to save the facility from filing bankruptcy, they hoped to merge companies with the Charlotte Motor Speedway, led by track president Richard Howard. A deal with Charlotte was officially confirmed in December; an announcement that American Raceways had left the track's management was also made. However, a month later, Charlotte backed out of the merger, with Howard claiming that "many factors", including a local 5% "amusement tax" on gate receipts, misleading debt figures, and an increase of ad-valorem tax by fourfold had made him back out of the deal, essentially sealing the facility's fate of bankruptcy.

==== Bankruptcy ====
Atlanta International Raceway officially filed for Chapter 10 bankruptcy on January 19, 1971, becoming a ward under the orders of United States District Court for the Northern District of Georgia judge Sidney Oslin Smith Jr. The court later appointed attorney R. Neal Batson to run the track as trustee. The bankruptcy itself was also seen as a key point that put the stability of stock car racing into question; superspeedways like Atlanta across the Southeast had found themselves in economic trouble, with car manufacturers withdrawing financial support from it. At the time of the filing, the facility found itself with around $1,400,000 in debt. With the move, the facility was able to hold the 1971 Atlanta 500, securing a loan from the First National Bank of Atlanta. Five board members also pledged to raise $175,000–200,000 for the race to run. The race later found itself to be crucial to AIR's survival; with a crowd of 65,000 or more being claimed for the minimum number needed for its survival, former general manager Hal Hamrick stated, "If the fans don't turnout for this one, it is the end of major league auto racing in Atlanta and the end of AIR".

The 1971 Atlanta 500 saw a crowd of around 57,000. While below the number that was claimed to be needed, Batson viewed it optimistically, although warning that "we're not out of the woods". After the race, three groups displayed interest in buying the track, including Howard. In May, Batson was replaced by lawyer Stacy Cotton as trustee, with Walter Nix later being appointed as general manager. Within the first year of bankruptcy, AIR made around $188,000, showing optimistic progress. In the 1972 Atlanta 500, a storm plagued the track, destroying numerous amenities, including concession stands and parts of grandstands. However, despite the storm, the race was able to make a profit. The next year, while making around $750,000 in profit, Cotton approved a reorganization plan that would allow Jim Baker and Walter Nix to own controlling interest of the track for $500,000, with the duo planning to use $350,000 of the money to buy stocks. The plan caused some outrage among minority stockholders, who felt that the value of their stock had decreased massively with the deal.

Bankruptcy judge W. H. Drake recommended the reorganization plan in June. The next month, North Carolina Motor Speedway president L. G. DeWitt joined Baker and Nix in their bid to own the track. The reorganization plan was rejected by AIR stockholders; in response, Drake made modifications to appease the opposing stockholders. By the end of the year, Smith awarded the three ownership and placed Larry Hogan and Bob Latford to run AIR. However, in April 1974, leading stockholder James Price challenged the decision in the United States Court of Appeals for the Fifth Circuit, as stockholders voted again to reject the plan. Price claimed that if the three bought the track, the stock would lose five-sixths of its value. The court denied Price's bid in January 1975, essentially setting up control for the three. Price later appealed to the Supreme Court of the United States in May, who rejected to hear his appeal. The initial phase of reorganization that included debt payments began in July of that year. By January 1976, the second phase started, which gave creditors options for their stock. Two months later, on March 10, the track was officially turned over to a five-man board of directors, ending five years of bankruptcy. With the deal, the three owned around 52% of AIR.

=== Post-bankruptcy under Walter Nix and L. G. DeWitt ===
In 1978, AIR underwent a repave which was completed by June of that year. By the end of the year, Hogan resigned from his position as general manager. The next year, during the 1979 Atlanta 500, the first fatality at AIR occurred when Dennis Wade, an 18-year-old mechanic for Dave Watson, was hit by Watson after he spun on pit road, killing Wade. Within the year, Winston-Salem Journal writer Mike Mulhurn reported that a group directed by Hogan tried to oust DeWitt from his leadership at both North Carolina Motor Speedway and AIR. However, the takeover of both facilities failed. In 1984, a crash including driver Terry Schoonover claimed the life of the first racer at the facility during the 1984 Atlanta Journal 500. Partly as a result of Schoonover's death, then-general manager Mike Helton announced the construction of new walls. In January 1986, Helton announced $3 million in renovations ahead of the 1986 The Winston. Two years later, the facility went through its second repave in 10 years; the repave was meant to be done the next year, but Nix decided otherwise. In September 1989, The Charlotte Observer reported that motorsports businessman Roger Penske offered to purchase the facility from DeWitt and Nix at an unspecified amount. However, on the 22nd, the duo was reported to have rejected Penske's offer.

=== Bruton Smith era ===
On February 22, 1990, both Charlotte and Atlanta local media reported that negotiations between Nix and a prospective buyer looking to purchase AIR, Charlotte Motor Speedway owner Bruton Smith, began. Although the facility was expected to have been sold within the month, by the next day, both men denied that the sale had gone through; Smith reported delays in the sale due to "small snags", and Nix outright denied a closed deal. Four days later, Charlotte Observer writer Tom Higgins reported that a sale was imminent, which Nix again denied. In early March, Smith claimed that he was waiting for Nix to agree to the deal. Two months later, although his earlier offer stalled, Smith stated renewed hope at purchasing AIR. After another two months passed, AIR released a press statement that declared that Smith's second offer was most likely going to be accepted by AIR's directors. By mid-October, Winston-Salem Journal writer Mike Mulhurn wrote that Smith had begun planning his first promotions at the track, unofficially confirming his purchase.

Smith's purchase was officially confirmed on October 24, paying $19.8 million for the facility. Bob Marcum, the manager at the Speedway Club at Charlotte Motor Speedway, was appointed as general manager. With the purchase, Smith announced a plan that sought to invest $75 million worth of renovations to the track. The facility was also renamed to Atlanta Motor Speedway. Within the first year of Smith's ownership, he announced the construction of a new 21,000-seat grandstand along with traffic flow improvements, which had been a major issue with the facility since the track's inception. The improvements were completed by November 1991. A month later, he announced the construction of a 2.5 miles (4.0 km) road course layout that utilized both the oval and specialized infield portions, creating a "roval"; the road course held its first races in September 1992. That same year, Marcum resigned from his position, with vice president of events at Charlotte Motor Speedway, Ed Clark, replacing him. In 1993, Clark announced a three-year plan to expand capacity to 180,000. Along with the announcement, plans for a new condominium complex, totaling 112 units, were made. Groundbreaking on the complex, named Tara Place, started on June 1, and although it saw initial poor sales, the $25 million facility partially opened by March 1994.

==== 1997 repave ====
Within 1994, Clark announced further renovations that were scheduled to be completed by 2000. Among said renovations were the addition of 68,000 seats, expansion of luxury boxes, and the reconfiguration of the track to become a quad-oval. Tara Place was fully completed in November of that year, with 32 of the 46 condos being sold. In August 1995, a new grandstand was constructed, adding 21,000 permanent seats. The reconfiguration started a year and a half later, turning the track from a 1.52 miles (2.45 km) true oval into a 1.54 miles (2.48 km) quad-oval. The decision at the time drew criticism from drivers, including Dale Earnhardt, John Andretti, and Johnny Benson Jr. The renovation itself cost $30 million and added 37,000 seats, a 1/4 mile (0.40 km) oval for legends car racing within the track's frontstretch, 44 luxury suites, and upgraded garages. The first tire tests on the new surface were run in September by Bill Elliott, and it held its first races in November.

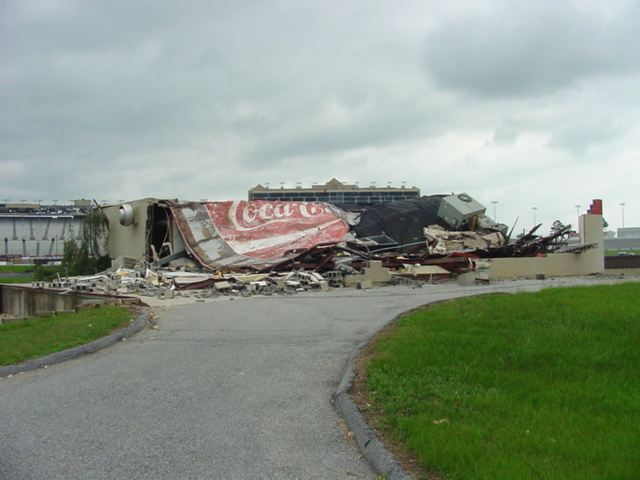
Tornado damage to the facility caused by Hurricane Cindy in 2005

In July 2005, a F2 tornado caused by the remnants of Hurricane Cindy hit the facility, causing an estimated $40 million in damage to the facility's grandstands, condominium complex, and other amenities. The racing surface, however, was not affected, and cars were able to test on the facility in early August. The next year, developers demolished the backstretch Weaver Grandstands, converting it to a motorhome parking lot. To replace it, developers built a new portion of grandstands on the frontstretch, adding new suites on top of the newly built Winners Grandstand. With the addition, seating was expanded to 113,000. Four years later, the track lost one of its NASCAR Cup Series race weekends to Kentucky Speedway, another track that Bruton Smith owned. Throughout the 2010s, AMS made gradual decreases to capacity; by 2015, capacity decreased to 71,000 according to NBC Sports. Further decreases were made in early 2018, when an unspecified number of seats were torn down in order to construct a hospitality area. Later that year, Clark stepped down from his position as general manager, handing it over to assistant general manager Brandon Hutchison.

=== Entertainment complex proposal, 2021 repave ===
Track logo when it was known as "Atlanta Motor Speedway"

In late 2019, Clark announced a proposal to build a $1 billion entertainment complex if the state of Georgia legalized gambling. A hearing in the Georgia House of Representatives was scheduled in January 2020, with the Henry County Board of Commissioners later voting in favor a statement of approval for a statewide referendum on the issue on the 21st. However, the bill, now titled Senate Resolution 841, was viewed as a long shot; SR 841 needed a two-thirds majority in both houses of the Georgia General Assembly along with a popular vote, with Georgia historically holding a hardline stance on anti-gambling due to religious influence. In March 2021, the proposal saw revived support when Georgia saw increased support for online sports betting, with Clark now campaigning to legalize gambling. However, by 2022, although Hutchison and Clark maintained they were still campaigning for the legalization of gambling and were still in support of building the complex, support for it essentially stagnated.

Clark announced his retirement from his position of president in December 2019 which took effect in March 2020, ending a 27-year reign and giving complete control to Hutchison. After Clark's retirement, SMI CEO Marcus Smith hinted at an upcoming repave and possible reconfiguration back to the original oval configuration if the entertainment complex proposal passed. On July 6, 2021, a repave and subsequent reconfiguration was officially announced; the first repave since 1997. Banking was increased in the turns by four degrees to a total of 28 degrees, and the racing surface was narrowed to produce a style of racing similar to superspeedway pack racing. The decision was met with criticism from drivers such as Denny Hamlin, Kevin Harvick, and Kyle Busch; particularly on accusations of a lack of driver input from SMI leadership. The repave was completed in late December, and the first tire tests took place the next month.

On June 3, 2025, SMI announced the track's renaming to EchoPark Speedway under a new seven-year sponsorship deal with the Smith family-owned business, EchoPark. The renaming ended a 35-year stint under the Atlanta Motor Speedway name.

== Events ==
=== Racing ===
==== NASCAR ====
The track hosts two annual NASCAR weekends, highlighted by NASCAR Cup Series races known as the Autotrader 400 and the Dollar Tree 400. The track also hosts one NASCAR O'Reilly Auto Parts Series races with the Bennett Transportation & Logistics 250 alongside two NASCAR Truck Series race known the Fr8 208 and TBA as support races for the Cup Series.

In 1986, the facility hosted a one-off iteration of The Winston (now known as the NASCAR All-Star Race), which was originally intended to rotate among different venues each year. However, due to lackluster attendance, the race was moved to Charlotte Motor Speedway, where it remained its permanent home until 2020.

==== IndyCar ====
In January 1961, the track confirmed dates for a USAC-sanctioned race in July with Indianapolis-style cars. However, after a frightened Eddie Sachs performed tire tests that saw average lap speeds over 150 miles per hour (240 km/h), USAC decided to cancel the race, with Henry Banks claiming that modifications to the track to accommodate USAC cars had not been made and that asphalt surface readings were at unsafe temperatures; up to 140 °F (60 °C). Track president at the time, Nelson Weaver, later questioned the authenticity of Sachs' fears and put out a statement that criticized USAC officials. Four years later, Weaver began renewed talks with USAC to host a race; this time, USAC awarded a race weekend in September. The race ran again the next year. In the 1970s and 1980s, Championship Auto Racing Teams (CART) also raced at the facility.

In 1997, the Indy Racing League (IRL) announced plans to race a 500 kilometres (310 mi) race at the facility, starting in 1998. The race lasted for four years; the race was removed from the IRL schedule by the 2002 season.

=== Other events and uses ===
The facility on numerous occasions has been used as an evacuee center in the event of hurricanes, including Hurricane Irma in 2017, Hurricane Florence and Hurricane Michael in 2018, Hurricane Dorian in 2019, Hurricane Ian in 2022, and Hurricane Idalia in 2023.

In 2021, the Atlanta Marathon was moved to the speedway and its perimeter roads as a result of COVID-19 restrictions in Fulton County. That same year, America's Got Talent: Extreme filmed its first season at the facility.

==== Movie production ====
The facility has been used in the production of numerous films. It was first used for movie production in 1962 movie Thundering Wheels, with driver Jack Smith being featured in the movie. Since, the facility has been used for the 1980 film Smokey and the Bandit II, the 1982 Daniel Petrie-directed Six Pack, and the 1983 Hal Needham-directed Stroker Ace. In recent years, the 2017 film Logan Lucky used the facility as a stand-in for the Charlotte Motor Speedway.

== Lap records ==
As of February 2025, the fastest official race lap records at the EchoPark Speedway are listed as:

Category	Time	Driver	Vehicle	Event
Quad-oval with reconfigured banking (2022–present): 1.540 mi (2.478 km)
NASCAR Cup	0:29.361	Josh Berry	Ford Mustang GT	2024 Ambetter Health 400
NASCAR Truck	0:30.097	Derek Kraus	Chevrolet Silverado	2022 Fr8 208
NASCAR Xfinity	0:30.402	Christian Eckes	Chevrolet Camaro ZL1	2025 Bennett Transportation & Logistics 250
Quad-oval (1997–2021): 1.540 mi (2.478 km)
Indy Racing League	0:24.732	Billy Boat	Dallara IR-7	1998 Atlanta 500 Classic
NASCAR Cup	0:30.085	Kyle Larson	Chevrolet SS NASCAR	2017 Folds of Honor QuikTrip 500
NASCAR Xfinity	0:30.854	Martin Truex Jr.	Toyota GR Supra NASCAR	2021 EchoPark 250
NASCAR Truck	0:30.861	Kyle Busch	Toyota Tundra NASCAR	2021 Fr8Auctions 200
Road course (1992–1996): 2.522 mi (4.059 km)
IMSA GTP	1:13.514	Juan Manuel Fangio II	Eagle Mk III	1993 Toyota Grand Prix of Atlanta
IMSA GTP Lights	1:21.979	Parker Johnstone	Spice SE90P	1993 Toyota Grand Prix of Atlanta
WSC	1:24.278	François Migault	Kudzu DG-2	1993 Toyota Grand Prix of Atlanta
IMSA Supercar	1:36.008	Doc Bundy	Lotus Esprit X180R	1993 Toyota Grand Prix of Atlanta
