= Spice SE90 =

Spice SE90 may refer to:

- Spice SE90C, a group C sports prototype racing car
- Spice SE90P, an IMSA GTP sports prototype racing car
