= Spice SE92P =

Sports prototype race car

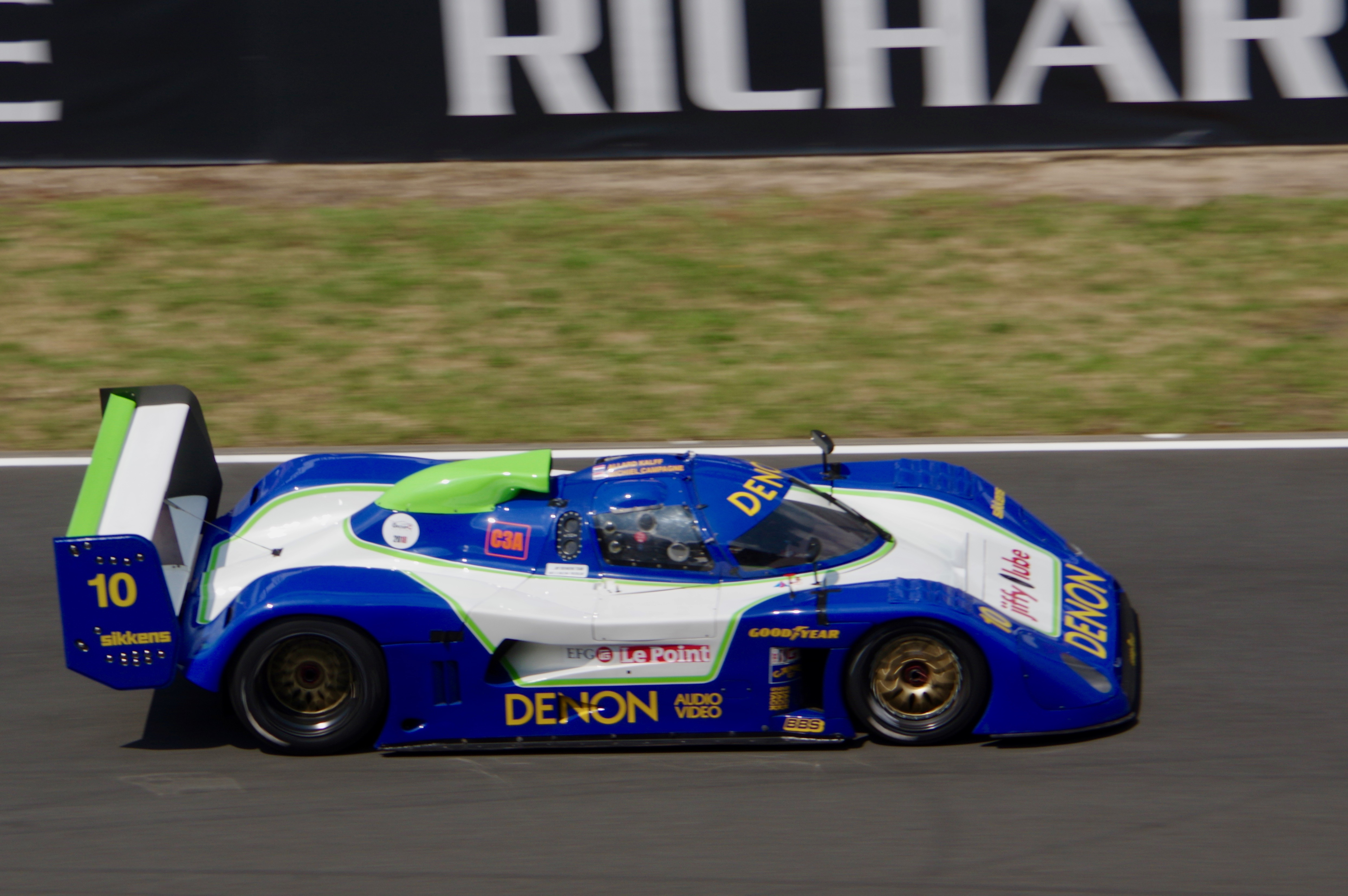
- Category: IMSA GTP
- Designer(s): Graham Humphrys
- Predecessor: Spice SE91P

Technical specifications
- Chassis: Aluminium honeycomb monocoque, carbon fiber-kevlar body
- Suspension: double wishbones, coil springs over dampers, anti-roll bar (front) double wishbones, rocker-actuated coil springs over dampers, anti-roll bar (rear)
- Axle track: 58.5 in (1,486 mm) (front); 58.5 in (1,490 mm) (rear)
- Wheelbase: 107.7 in (2,736 mm)
- Engine: Chevrolet 6.5 L (396.7 cu in) 90° OHV V8, naturally-aspirated, mid-engined
- Transmission: Hewland DGB 5-speed manual
- Power: 800 hp (600 kW)
- Weight: 1,984 lb (900 kg)
- Brakes: AP Racing ventilated brake discs

Competition history

The Spice SE92P is an IMSA GTP sports prototype race car, designed, developed and built by British manufacturer Spice Engineering, for sports car racing, in 1992.
