= Intrepid RM-1 =

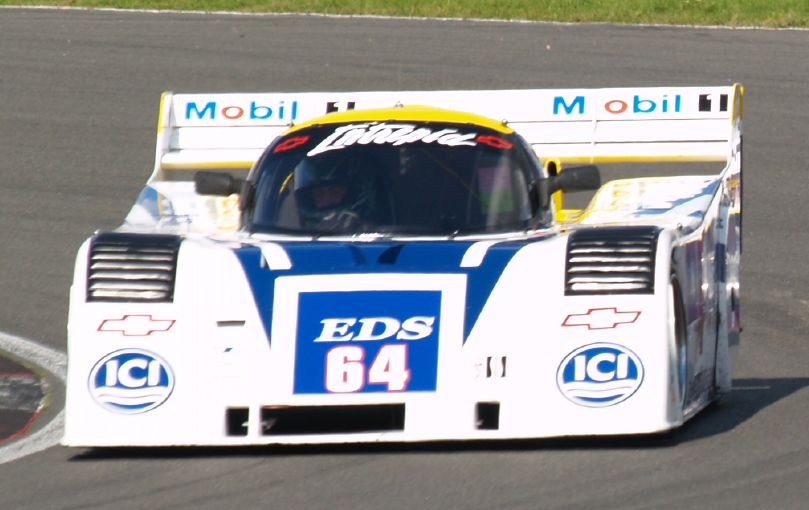
- Category: IMSA GTP
- Constructor: Pratt & Miller
- Designers: Bob and Bill Riley

Technical specifications
- Chassis: Carbon fibre and aluminum honeycomb composite monocoque with steel roll cage
- Suspension (front): Double wishbone with pushrod-actuated inboard spring/damper
- Suspension (rear): Double wishbone with pushrod-actuated bellhousing-mounted spring/damper
- Length: 189 in (480.1 cm)
- Width: 78 in (198.1 cm)
- Height: 41 in (104.1 cm)
- Wheelbase: 110 in (279.4 cm)
- Engine: Katech-built Chevrolet 6.5–7.2 L (397–439 cu in) V8 Naturally aspirated mid-mounted
- Transmission: Hewland 5-speed + reverse manual
- Weight: 1,800 lb (816 kg)
- Tyres: Goodyear Eagle; BBS wheels, 17x13 front, 17x15 rear

Competition history
- Notable entrants: MTI Racing; Prototype Technology Group; Wayne Taylor Racing
- Notable drivers: (United States) Tommy Kendall (South Africa) Wayne Taylor (United States) John Paul Jr. (United States) Al Unser Jr. (United Kingdom) Perry McCarthy
- Debut: 1991 Toyota Camel Grand Prix of Palm Beach
Races	Wins	Poles	F/Laps
32	1	6	6
- Teams' Championships: 0
- Constructors' Championships: 0
- Drivers' Championships: 0

The Intrepid RM-1 (also known as the Intrepid GTP or Chevrolet Intrepid) is a sports prototype racing car designed in 1991 by Bob and Bill Riley and built by Pratt & Miller to IMSA GTP specifications. Powered by a Chevrolet V8 engine, it was campaigned variously by Jim Miller, Prototype Technology Group and Wayne Taylor in the IMSA Camel GT from 1991 through 1993. Though it won only one race in its three seasons of competition, the shovel-nosed Intrepid was notable for the extreme—and at one point, disastrous—levels of downforce it generated, giving it the highest cornering speeds of any prototype of its era. The car's development was set back by a devastating 1991 crash at Watkins Glen that critically injured driver Tommy Kendall, and the program never fully recovered.

== Design and development ==
Jim Miller originally hired Bob Riley and his son, Bill, in 1990 to design improvements to his Spice Engineering-built GTP car. However, Miller was unsatisfied with campaigning customer prototypes—"If you're going to be competitive you had to have a unique car," Miller said. Bob had earlier developed conceptual plans for a high-downforce, rear-engined GTP car as a follow-on to his mid-1980s Ford Mustang GTP design, and Miller agreed to fund the design and construction of what became known as the Intrepid RM-1. The chassis was constructed by Pratt & Miller, an engineering firm formed by a partnership between Miller and Gary Pratt.

In designing the Intrepid, Bob Riley considered developing maximum downforce as the primary goal rather than minimizing aerodynamic drag, which meant sacrificing the car's top speed in favor of increasing its cornering speed. He viewed this tradeoff as a favorable one given the relatively slow and twisting nature of most American road courses compared to European circuits. Other teams viewed this effort skeptically, as traditionally drag is viewed as the enemy of a racing car designer. As a result, Pratt recalled, "The Intrepid had quite a bit of a different look than anybody else out there." Also unlike other IMSA GTP designs, the Intrepid was never intended to be suitable for endurance races such as the 24 Hours of Daytona or 12 Hours of Sebring. This was an intentional decision by Riley to sacrifice durability and longevity in favor of outright speed—as a result, in its three seasons of competition, the Intrepid was never entered in a 24-hour race and only once was entered in the 12 Hours of Sebring, in 1992.

Miller originally planned on powering the Intrepid with a 1,000-horsepower Judd GV10; however, Chevrolet became interested in participating in the project and offered an 800-horsepower Katech-built small-block V8. Though this left the Intrepid underpowered relative to its original design parameters, it also allowed the car to run at a lighter weight as part of an equalization formula. This rules break, combined with financial support and factory backing offered by GM, led Miller to accept Chevrolet's proposal.

== Racing history ==
=== 1991 ===
The Intrepid RM-1 made its racing debut on the streets of West Palm Beach, in the Toyota Camel Grand Prix of Palm Beach. The debut was auspicious, as Wayne Taylor qualified the car in sixth place and worked his way through the field to a second-place finish, just behind the Jaguar of Davy Jones and ahead of defending series champion Geoff Brabham's all-conquering Nissan NPT-90. After tests at Sebring International Raceway revealed the Intrepid's undoubted superiority to the Spice, construction of a second car was given the green light. Fitted with new aerodynamic wheel covers developed after the testing, Taylor captured the Intrepid's first pole position at the Miami Grand Prix. At Heartland Park Topeka, Taylor set the fastest race lap and finished fourth. Midway through the season, at Lime Rock Park, the second Intrepid chassis was completed and Tommy Kendall very nearly swept the entire weekend with it, as he took the pole, set fastest lap and was well on his way to victory before making contact with Taylor while lapping him, sending both cars spinning off track and ruining the afternoon.

In the span of a fortnight in June, the Intrepid was to experience both its pinnacle of success and its most disastrous failure. On the rough, rain-soaked streets of New Orleans, Wayne Taylor took full advantage of the Intrepid's "massive grip" and drove his #64 machine to the chassis' maiden — and only — IMSA GTP victory in the Nissan Grand Prix du Mardi Gras. Two weeks later, the series moved to the Camel Continental VIII at Watkins Glen International, where long straightaways are coupled with smooth, flowing corners to make for one of the fastest road courses in North America. Here, the Intrepid's design showed off its contradictions. On the straights, its massive drag left the Intrepid as much as 30 miles per hour (48 km/h) slower than its GTP competitors, but its equally massive downforce meant that the Intrepid fairly flew through the turns with superior handling. In qualifying, Tommy Kendall continued the Intrepid's streak of strong performances with an outside pole. But the Intrepid's incredible downforce would prove to be its downfall.

Halfway through the 500-kilometer event, Kendall was battling with Brabham in Turn 5 when the #65 Intrepid's left rear wheel flew off. The car pitched into a lurid, uncontrollable spin and slammed into the guardrail head-on at 140 miles per hour (230 km/h), tearing the front end of the chassis apart. Kendall suffered massive trauma to his lower extremities, shattering both ankles and breaking his right leg in two places. "I looked at my legs and puked," Kendall remembered later. A post-accident investigation and failure analysis revealed that the Intrepid's left rear upright had collapsed under the stress of the car's nearly 10,000 pounds of downforce, tearing the wheel loose and sending the Intrepid hopelessly out of control. The part was immediately redesigned and never again failed under racing conditions but the accident sidelined the team's hot young driver for the rest of the season and dissuaded potential buyers who would have funded further development. Gary Pratt recalled "There was a lot of interest being generated, and then that big crash at Watkins Glen. That really hurt. The car was looking good, the thing to have. (The crash) took the wind right out of our sails."

=== 1992 ===
Chevrolet reduced its support of Jim Miller's team for 1992, cutting the squad to a one-car effort for Kendall. Two cars were purchased by Tom Milner's Prototype Technology Group, but a rules-mandated switch from carbon to steel brakes—for which the car had not been designed—and a lack of development funding meant that between the teams, the Intrepid was able to post just three podium finishes during the season. "It was a disaster of a year, a total disaster," Taylor remembered.

=== 1993 ===
The final year for the Intrepid was also the final year for the IMSA GTP category, and by 1993 the chassis was showing its age. Wayne Taylor was the lone Intrepid entrant, and he only entered the season's nine sprint races. But even with the GTP grids thoroughly depleted by Toyota's dominance in the previous season, success would prove elusive. A fifth-place finish at Miami in Taylor's first race of the season seemed to portend a reasonable chance of victory. The rest of the year brought nothing but disappointment, however, as the Intrepid team suffered a slew of mechanical maladies and Taylor was running at the finish in just three of the final eight races, never placing higher than eighth. The season seemed to be summed up at Road America, where All American Racers and the juggernaut Eagle MkIIIs did not enter. Taylor qualified on the outside pole and ran a strong second for the first half of the race, challenging the lead Porsche 962 for 30 laps—until the engine let go, ending what was perhaps the Intrepid's last, best chance for another IMSA GTP victory.

== Legacy ==
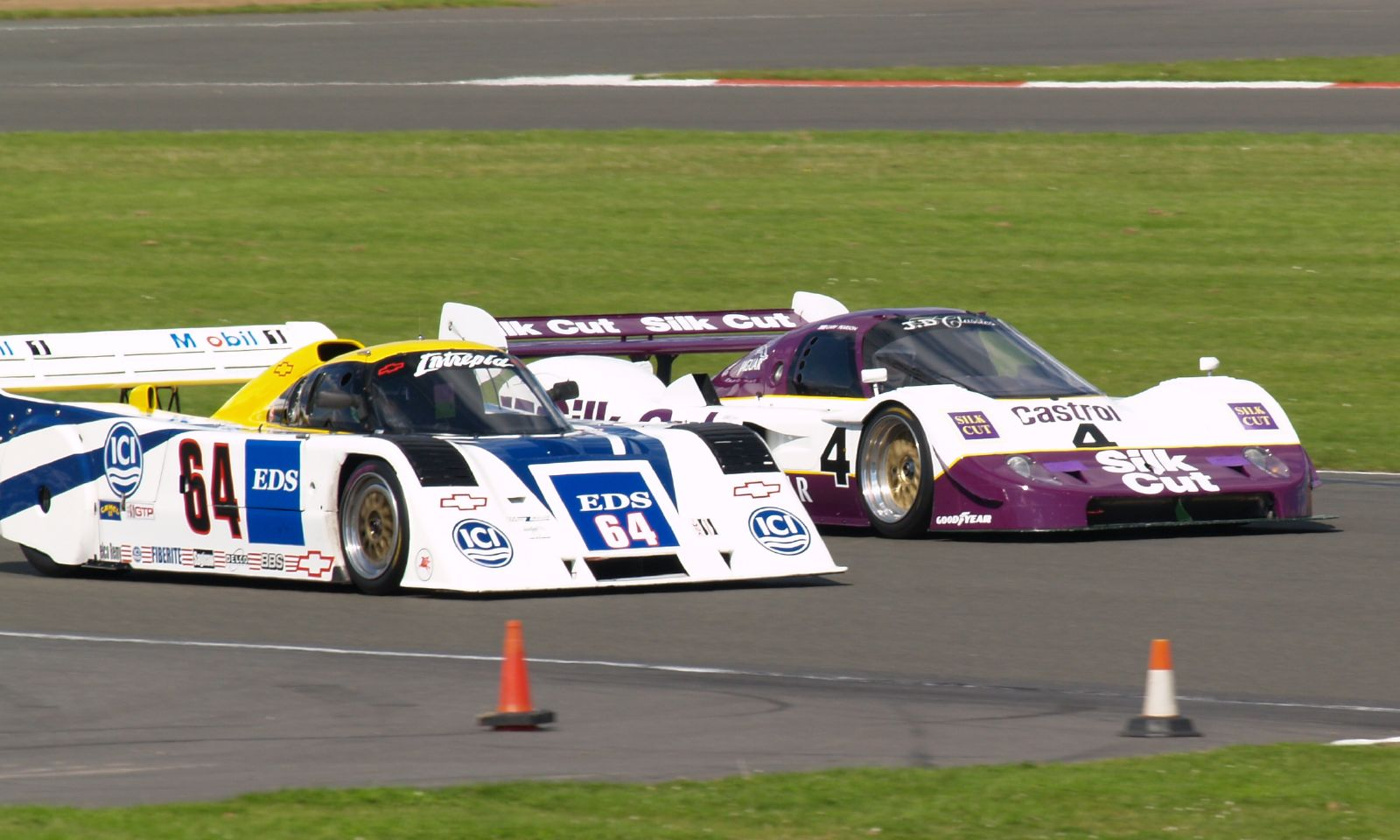
An Intrepid RM-1 (left) racing alongside a Jaguar XJR-11 at the Silverstone Classic in 2007.

While the Intrepid RM-1's brief career was marked by unfulfilled promise, the car's design principles would live to fight—and win—another day. The father-and-son Riley design team founded Riley & Scott in 1993, where they developed the Riley & Scott Mk III, one of the most successful and longest-lived designs of the World Sports Car era. A decade later, Bill Riley designed the equally successful Riley MkXI Daytona Prototype. Both prototypes bear a family resemblance to the Intrepid, particularly in their shared shovel-nose design.
