= Mazda RX-792P =

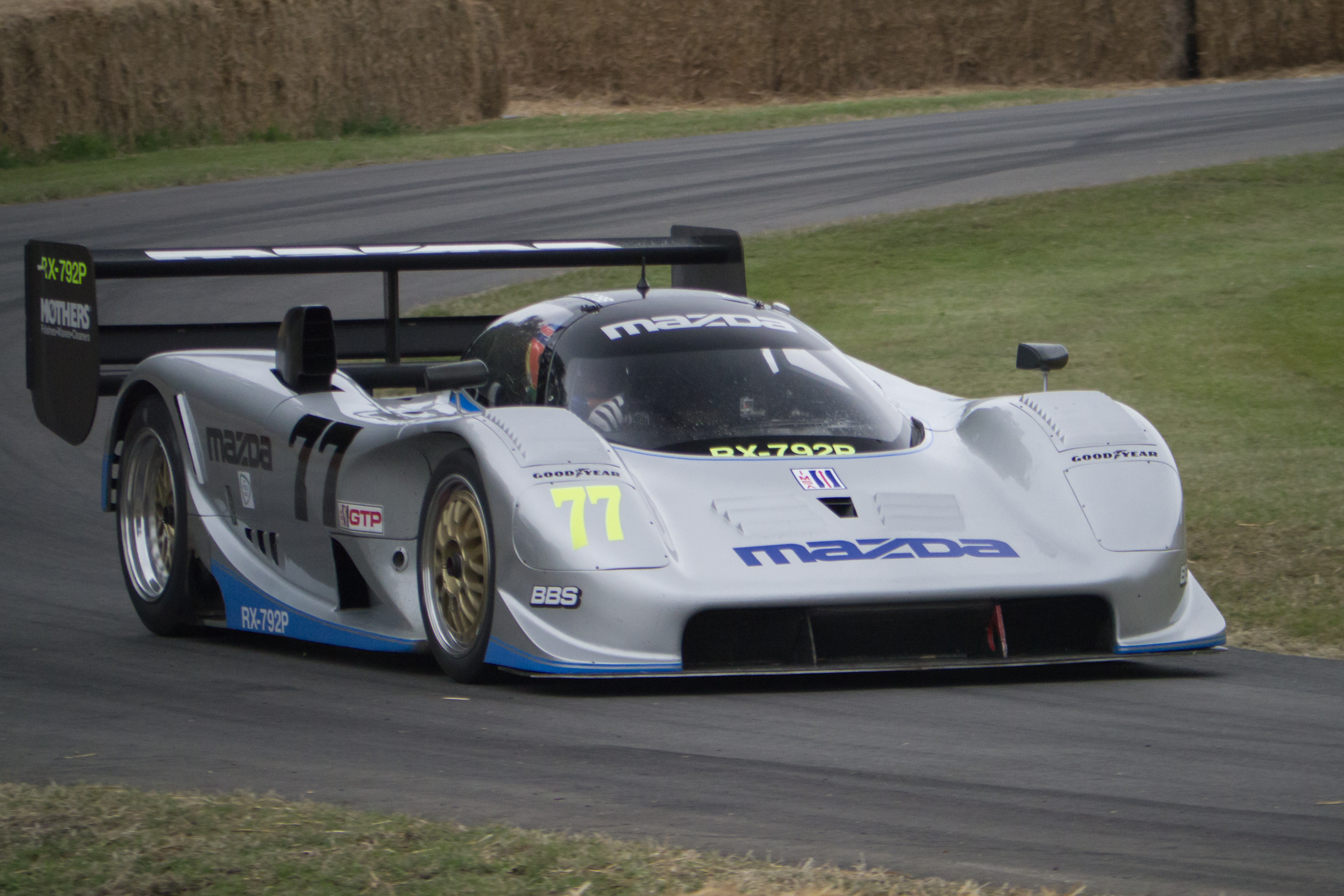

Overview
- Manufacturer: Mazda (Crawford)
- Production: 1992
- Designer: Lee Dykstra; Randy Wittine

Body and chassis
- Class: IMSA sports prototype
- Body style: 2-door Coupé
- Layout: RMR layout
- Related: Mazda 787B

Powertrain
- Engine: 2.6 L (159 cu in) R26B Rotary-4
- Power output: 690 hp (700 PS; 515 kW) at 9,000 rpm 608 N⋅m (448 lb⋅ft) at 4,500 rpm
- Transmission: March 5-speed manual

Dimensions
- Wheelbase: 2,667 mm (105.0 in)
- Length: 4,800 mm (189.0 in)
- Width: 1,981 mm (78.0 in)
- Height: 1,016 mm (40.0 in)
- Curb weight: 830 kg (1,829.8 lb)

The Mazda RX-792P is a sports prototype racing car built for the IMSA GT Championship's GTP category for Mazda. Its career was short lived, with only two cars running in 1992 before the project was abandoned.

The car's name is a combination of Mazda's RX-7 road car, the year the car raced (1992) and the fact that it was a Prototype.

== Development ==
Following many successful years running the RX-7 in IMSA's GTO class and MX-6 in the GTU class, Mazda chose to take on a new challenge. Although Mazda had supported the use of their rotary engines in GTP prototypes in the past, Mazda wished to compete with the likes of Porsche, Nissan, Jaguar and Toyota with a full factory effort. This would coincide with Mazda's continued running of the World Sportscar Championship in Europe, as well as the All Japan Sports Prototype Championship at home.

After Mazda's success in winning the 1991 24 Hours of Le Mans, a change in engine rules by the FIA forced Mazda to abandon their R26B 4-rotor in the World Sportscar Championship. However, IMSA rules continued to allow the use of rotaries, which led Mazda to bring the R26B to North America, with refinements to better suit the shorter races and circuits.

For a chassis, Mazda would use the expertise of Crawford Composites to construct the monocoque, while Fabcar would assist in the project. Due to the different style of racing, the new car would not share much from Mazda's previous effort, the 787B and its predecessors. The tub would be built from carbon fiber, while the bodywork designed by Lee Dykstra and Randy Wittine would feature new sweeping lines, including a large exposed vent flowing out from the front wheel well.

A total of three RX-792Ps were built by Crawford for Mazda before the project was cancelled.

== Racing history ==
Managed by Mazda Motorsports, the first RX-792P was completed shortly before the 1992 season began. The team consisted of drivers Price Cobb and Pete Halsmer. Opting to skip the 24 Hours of Daytona, the first chassis appeared at the Grand Prix of Miami. Unfortunately, a fire caused by the hot exhaust touching the car's bodywork would force the car to be withdrawn before the race even took place. This problem continued at the 12 Hours of Sebring, where the car caught fire once again just prior to the race.

By the next round at Road Atlanta, the second RX-792P chassis was completed. Both cars were entered in the event, but an accident in practice forced the second car to not run. The lone remaining RX-792P managed to take the green flag, finishing in a distant 15th place, nearly twenty laps behind the winner. With the second chassis repaired, Mazda moved to Lime Rock Park, where the cars would finally show their potential. After qualifying in the middle of the grid, the pair would come home in third and fourth places, three laps behind the winning Toyota. At Mid-Ohio the RX-792Ps finished sixth and ninth.

Problems crept up once again as the series moved to New Orleans, with one entry managing a mere 16th. However, the Mazda team would quickly rebound to take their best finish of the season, with a second place at Watkins Glen, even though this was actually five laps behind the winner. A follow-up seventh place at Laguna Seca would unfortunately be followed by a double DNF at Portland.

A quick rebound would see fourth and fifth places at Road America before the team once again failed to finish with either car at Phoenix. This trend would continue at the final race of the season, as neither car would make it to the checkered flag. This string of bad results would leave Mazda a distant sixth in the constructor's championship, although Price Cobb would be able to finish eighth in the driver's championship.

== Cancellation ==
Following the 1992 season, sports car racing throughout the world was greatly altered. Both the World Sportscar Championship and All Japan Sports Prototype Championship would be cancelled, leaving Mazda's expensive MXR-01 with nowhere to race. At the same time, IMSA announced plans to abandon the GTP category after the 1993 season, turning instead to a new category of open-cockpit prototypes. This meant that Mazda would only have one more year to be able to use the RX-792P in North America only before they would have to construct an all-new car.

The RX-792P effort was full steam ahead for 1993 and the group began to look towards improvements that could be made the chassis. On IMSA’s sliding weight vs. engine displacement scale, the Mazda 4-rotor came in at 1,750 lb (790 kg) and many teams had cause for concern about this, thinking that the Mazda engine had been gifted a power-to-weight ratio advantage. While the RX-792P showed occasional turns of speed, the reality was that the engine simply was giving up far too much horsepower to its competitors, thus making the perceived power-to-weight bias within the regulations just that, a perception and not a reality. Also, any advantage that might have been was certainly offset for the need to cool the car and the corresponding drag relative to power output.

With that in mind, Mazda was thinking about what could be done to close that power gap. Mazdaspeed supplied the program’s 4-rotor engines and had developments undergoing testing on the dynomometer in Japan that were producing in excess of 700hp. “Needless to say we were excited and looking forward to the 1993 season,” said Dick St. Yves, Mazda Motorsports Manager 1988-1993. Subsequently, design mockups were underway to move the oil cooler into the side pods and enlarging the front-mounted radiator. A program of weight reduction was also being considered as the car never scrutineered at its 1,750 lb (790 kg). minimum anyway, typically coming in around 75 lb (34 kg). above it.

The RX-792P program was done to an astonishingly small budget according to Dick St. Yves: “I have been told that Toyota’s budget was $20,000,000 and Nissan was in the area of $35,000,000, our budget was $5,000,000”. The program started in May 1991 in a vacant warehouse in Charlotte, North Carolina and by February 1992 the first car was assembled into these humble beginnings. The 4-rotor was giving up tremendous power as well, in the region of 200+, to its competitors. And while the regulations seemed give the Mazda a weight advantage, it certainly wasn’t able to bring that to bear. Considering year one a development year, as with all of the one-year wonders, year two certainly would have had much more to offer. Alas St. Yves relates that his 1993 budget had actually been approved by Mazda USA in October 1992 but for Mazda Corporation to announce a month later they were pulling out of racing: “The 4-rotor engine was the only component of the car that came from Japan. We were informed a few days later that they were discontinuing the experimental engine program, which was the 4-rotor, and that was the demise of the RX-792P program”. So team had a budget, but no engines. By December 1992 the doors were closed.
