= GT3 (1998–1999) =

Set of racing regulations

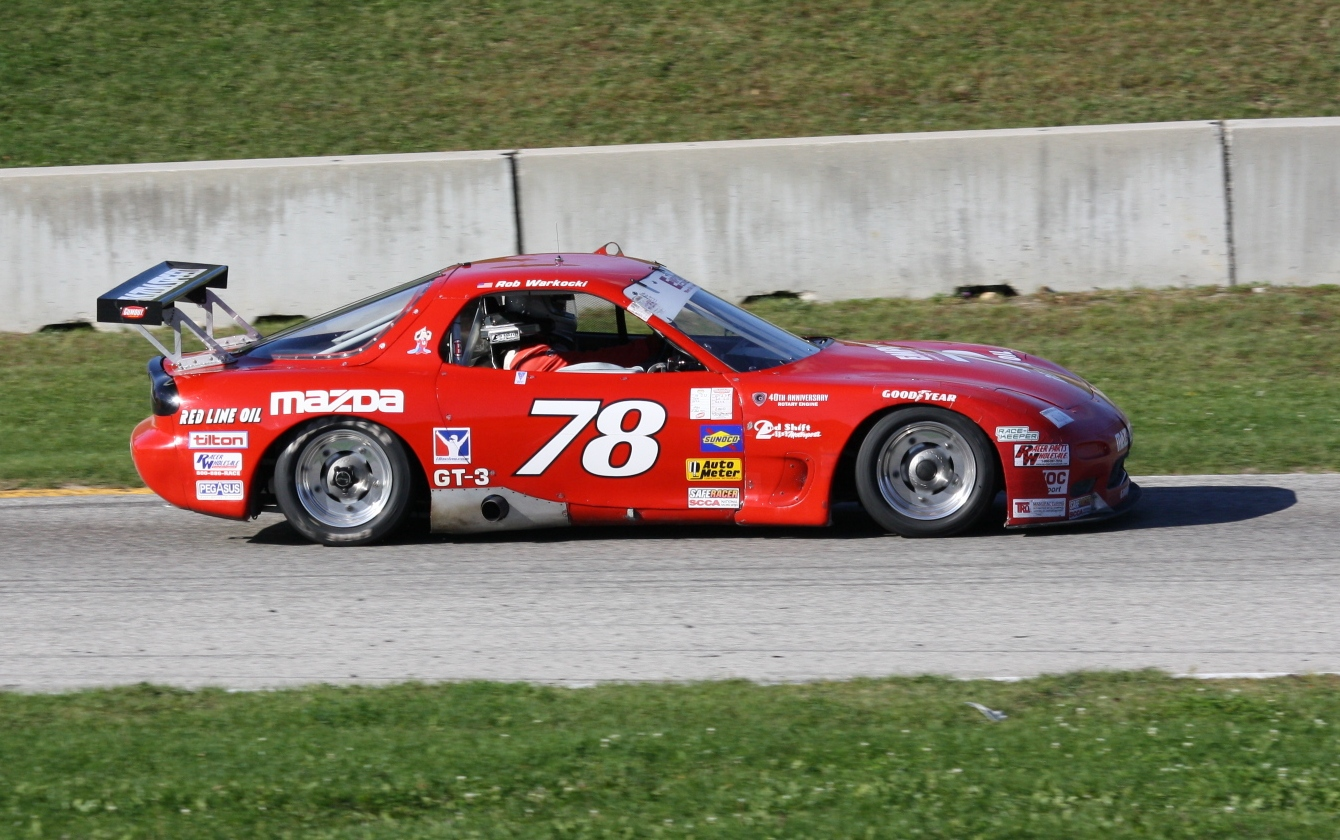
Mazda RX-7 GT3

GT3 is a former set of regulations used by both International Motor Sports Association (IMSA) and the Sports Car Club of America (SCCA), for production-based grand touring racing, between 1998 and 1999. The rules denoted the cars must be two-wheel-drive, use a steel tube frame or unibody chassis, and have an engine displacement ranging between 2.0 L (120 cu in) and 3.8 L (230 cu in). Certain vehicles used in the SCCA World Challenge were also eligible to compete in this division. Examples of cars that competed in this division included the BMW M3, Acura NSX, Nissan 240SX, Mazda RX-7, Porsche 911 RSR, and Porsche 993. The class evolved into the then GT (now known as LM GTE) category for the new American Le Mans Series in 1999, while the class continued to be used in the final season of the revived United States Road Racing Championship. It is essentially an evolution and continuation of the former GTU (known as GTS-2 between 1995 and 1996; and as GTS-3 in 1997) class.

== Cars ==
Manufacturer	Chassis	Debut
BMW	M3 E36	1998
Chevrolet	Camaro	1998
Ferrari	348	1999
Mazda	RX-7	1998
Mitsubishi	Eclipse GSX	1998
Nissan	240SX	1998
Pontiac	Firebird	1998
Porsche	911 Carrera RSR	1998

== See also ==
- IMSA GT classes
