= IMSA GT classes =

Classification of sports cars

IMSA GT classes are former classifications of sports prototypes in sports car racing competing in the IMSA GT Championship. The classes were used at different, overlapping times during the period from 1971 to 1998, over which the championship ran.

== Grand Touring Over ==
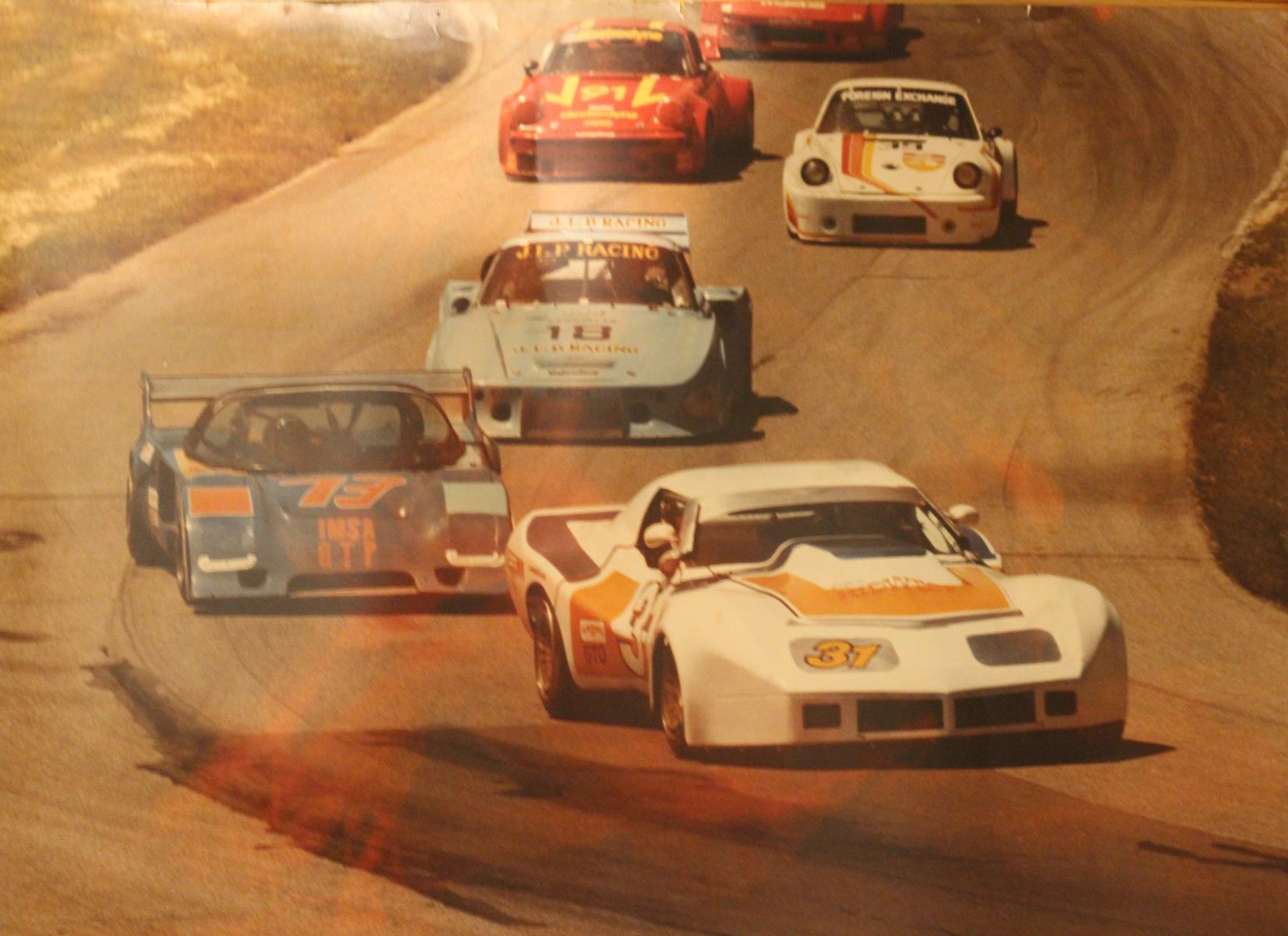
IMSA GTO cars at Road Atlanta in 1981

Grand Touring Over (GTO) is the name of a former classification designated to grand touring cars competing in the IMSA GT Championship, and later by Grand-Am in the Rolex Sports Car Series. IMSA used the class between 1971 and 1991, and Grand-Am used the class for a single season in 2000. The class had its origins in the original "TO" class used by the SCCA in the Trans-Am series, and was also similarly modeled to the FIA's Group 4 and Group 5 racing classes, but eventually evolved over time into its own category. The class specified an engine displacement of more than 2.5 L (150 cu in), with engine design and number of cylinders being unrestricted. Turbocharging and supercharging was allowed on engines up to a size of 6.0 L (370 cu in). Engines over 6.0 L (370 cu in) were required to be naturally aspirated. The original class became known as Grand Touring Supreme (GTS) in 1992.

=== Cars ===
Brand	Chassis	Debut
Alfa Romeo	Montreal	1974
AMC	AMX	1980
AMC	Gremlin	1975
AMC	Javelin	1974
AMC	Hornet	1971
AMC	Spirit	1984
AMC	Spirit AMX	1981
Avanti II		1983
Audi	90 Quattro	1989
BMW	2002 TI	1973
BMW	3.0 CSL	1974
BMW	3.5 CSL	1977
BMW	320i	1977
BMW	M1	1981
Buick	Skyhawk	1984
Buick	Skylark	1980
Buick	Somerset	1987
Chevrolet	Corvette	1971
Chevrolet	Corvette C2 Sting Ray	1980
Chevrolet	Corvette C3	1980
Chevrolet	Corvette C4	1988
Chevrolet	Corvette ZR-1	1991
Chevrolet	Monza	1977
Chevrolet	Nova	1980
Datsun	240Z	1980
Datsun	280ZX	1980
Datsun	280ZX Turbo	1981
De Tomaso	Pantera	1976
Ferrari	365 GT4 BB	1975
Ferrari	512	1985
Ferrari	512 BB	1985
Ford	Maverick	1983
Ford	Mustang Cobra	1983
Jaguar	XK-E	1974
Mazda	RX-7	1981
Mercury	Capri	1982
Mercury	Cougar XR-7	1989
Merkur	XR4Ti	1988
Nissan	300ZX Turbo	1989
Oldsmobile	Calais	1986
Oldsmobile	Starfire	1982
Oldsmobile	Toronado	1986
Plymouth	Volaré	1981
Pontiac	Astre	1977
Pontiac	Firebird	1980
Pontiac	Firebird Trans Am	1980
Porsche	911	1973
Porsche	924 Carrera GTR	1981
Porsche	928	1984
Porsche	934	1980
Porsche	944 Turbo	1987
Shelby	Mustang	1971
Toyota	Celica	1983
Toyota	Celica Turbo	1986
Toyota	Celica Turbo ST165	1988
Triumph	TR8	1980

== Grand Touring Under ==
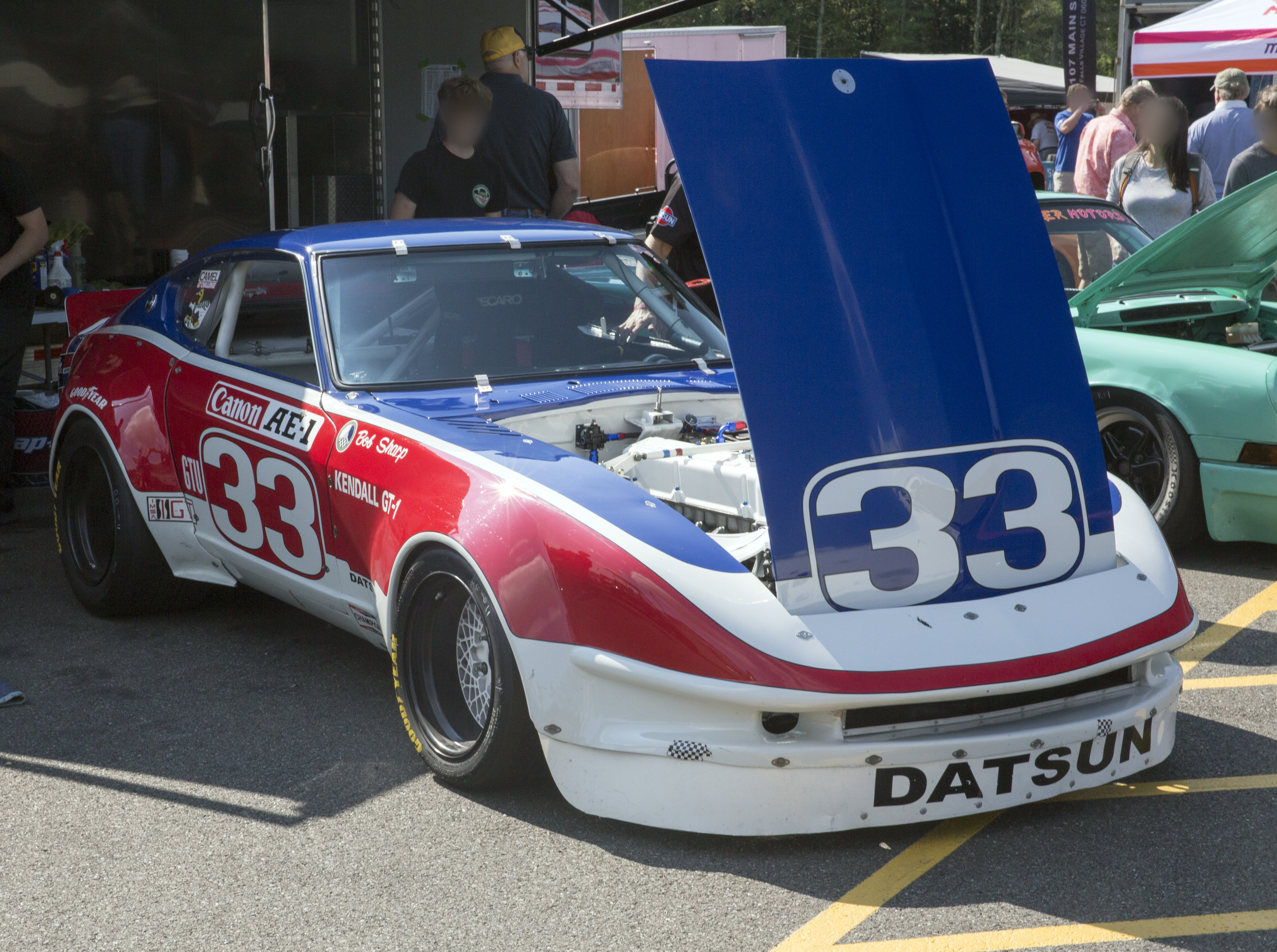
1973 Datsun 240Z GTU

Grand Touring Under (GTU) was a classification originally used in the IMSA GT Championship, and later by Grand-Am in the Rolex Sports Car Series. IMSA used the class between 1971 and 1994, and Grand-Am used the class for a single season in 2000. The original class rules specified an engine displacement of under 2.5 L (150 cu in), natural aspiration, and was the secondary class below the top-tier class, GTO. The class later became known as GTS-2 in 1995, then GTS-3 between 1996 and 1997, and eventually evolved into the GT3 class for 1998.

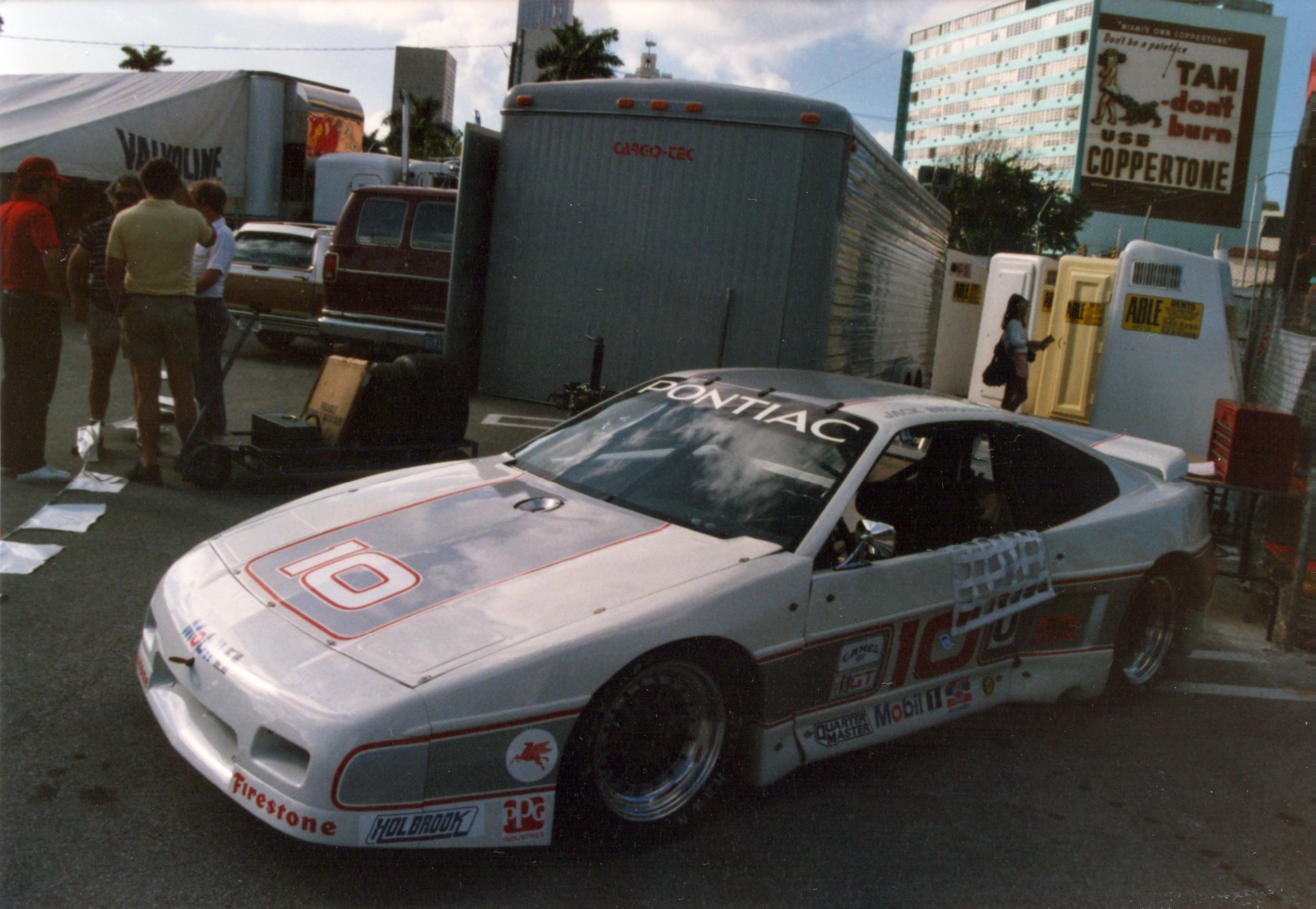
Pontiac Fiero GTU

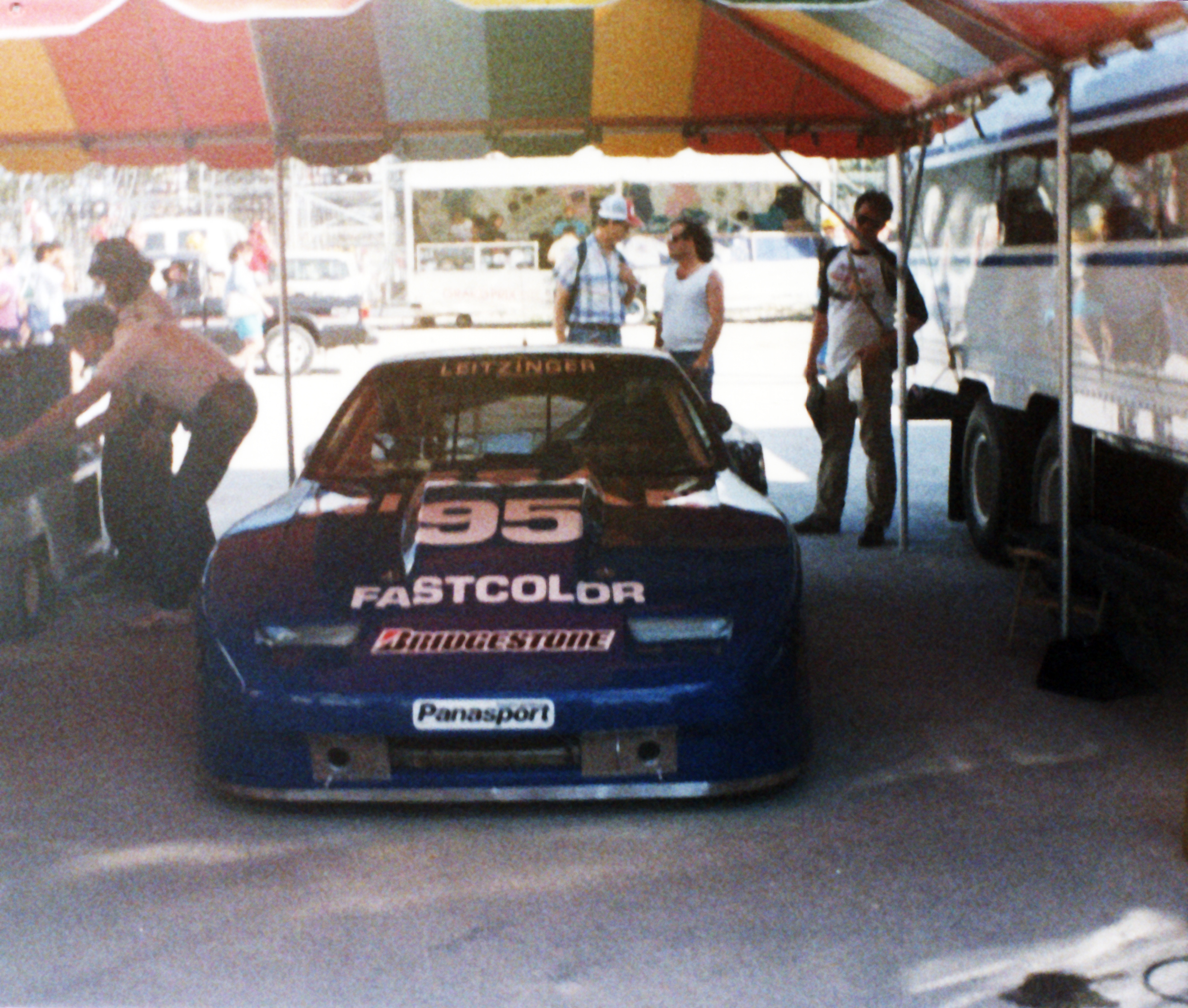
Nissan 300ZX GTU

== All American Grand Touring ==
All American Grand Touring (AAGT) was maintained by IMSA between 1975 and 1989. These cars were All-American, V8-powered, used a maximum of 5 forward gears, and used a steel tube frame (similar to the type used in the SCCA Trans-Am Series), and were designed to compete against heavyweight European manufacturers and machinery of the time, such as Porsche and BMW, who were dominating the series at the time.

=== Cars ===
==== American Motors ====
American Motors:

- AMC AMX
- AMC Javelin
- AMC Concord
- AMC Gremlin
- AMC Spirit
- AMC Hornet

==== Chrysler ====
Chrysler:

- Dodge Challenger
- Dodge Dart
- Dodge Demon
- Dodge Mirada
- Plymouth Barracuda
- Plymouth Duster

==== Ford ====
Ford:

- Ford Mustang
- Ford Mustang II
- Ford Pinto
- Mercury Bobcat
- Mercury Capri
- Mercury Cougar
- Shelby GT350

==== General Motors ====
General Motors:

- Buick Skylark
- Chevrolet Camaro
- Chevrolet Corvette
- Chevrolet Monza
- Chevrolet Nova
- Chevrolet Vega
- Oldsmobile Starfire
- Pontiac Astre
- Pontiac Firebird
- Pontiac Sunbird
- Pontiac Trans-Am

== American Challenge ==
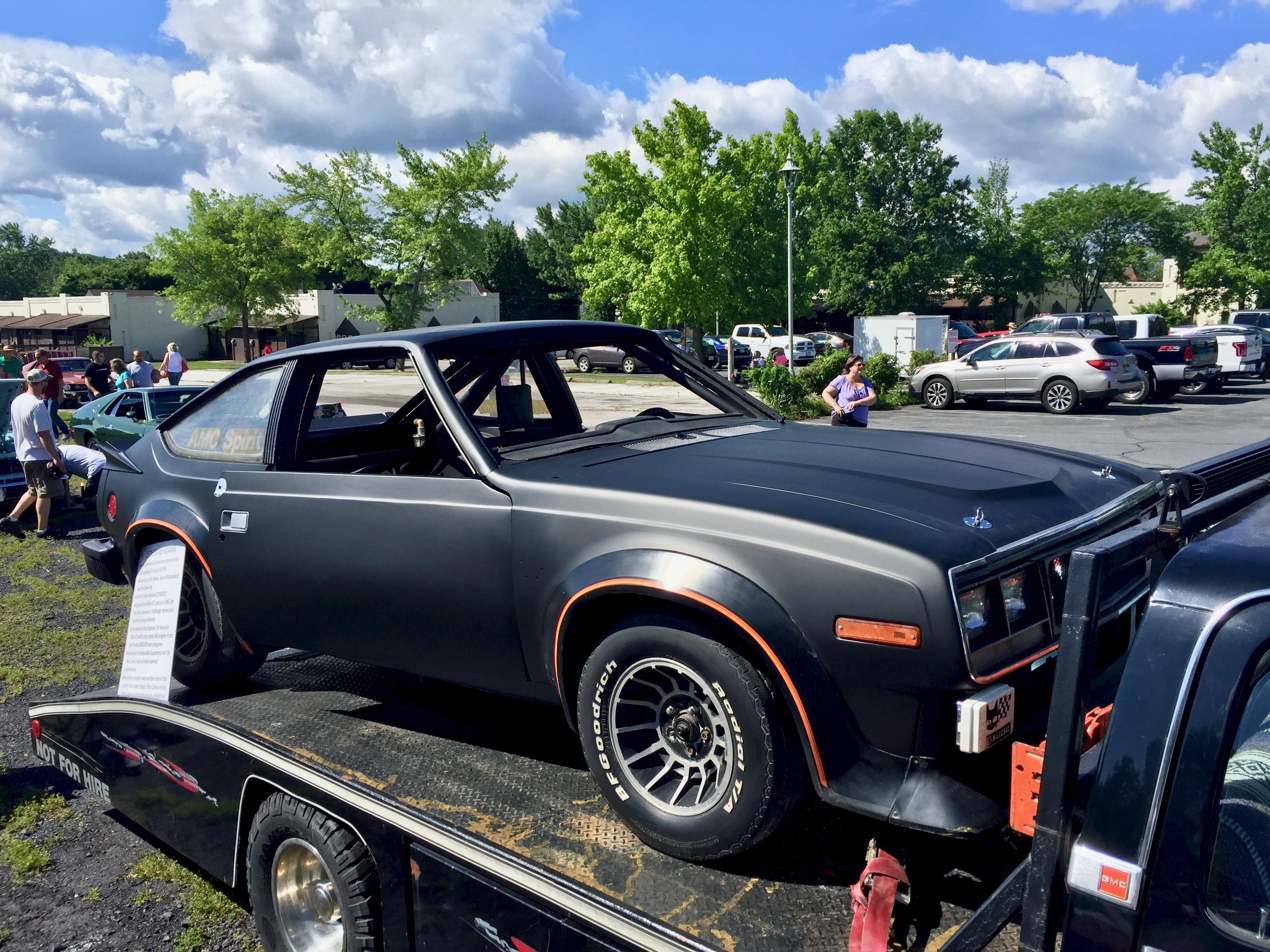
1979 AMC Sprint AMX

American Challenge, also known as the All American Challenge, and formally known as the Kelly American Challenge, was a category and set of regulations for the IMSA GT Championship between 1977 and 1989. Similar to the AAGT class, these cars were All-American, use a maximum of 5 forward gears, and use a steel tube frame (similar to the type used in SCCA Trans-Am Series cars).

== Grand Touring Experimental ==
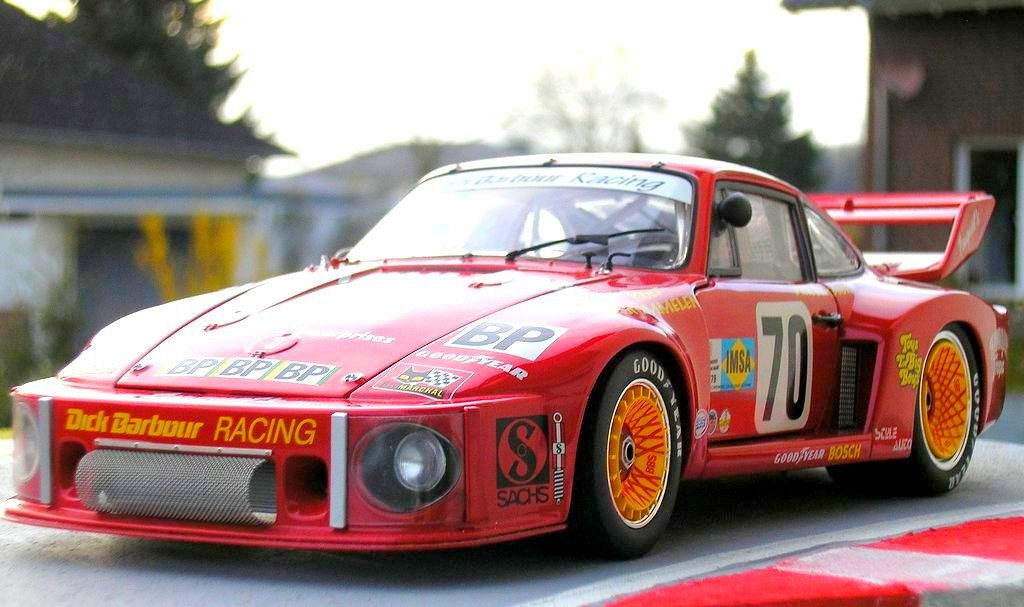
Porsche 935

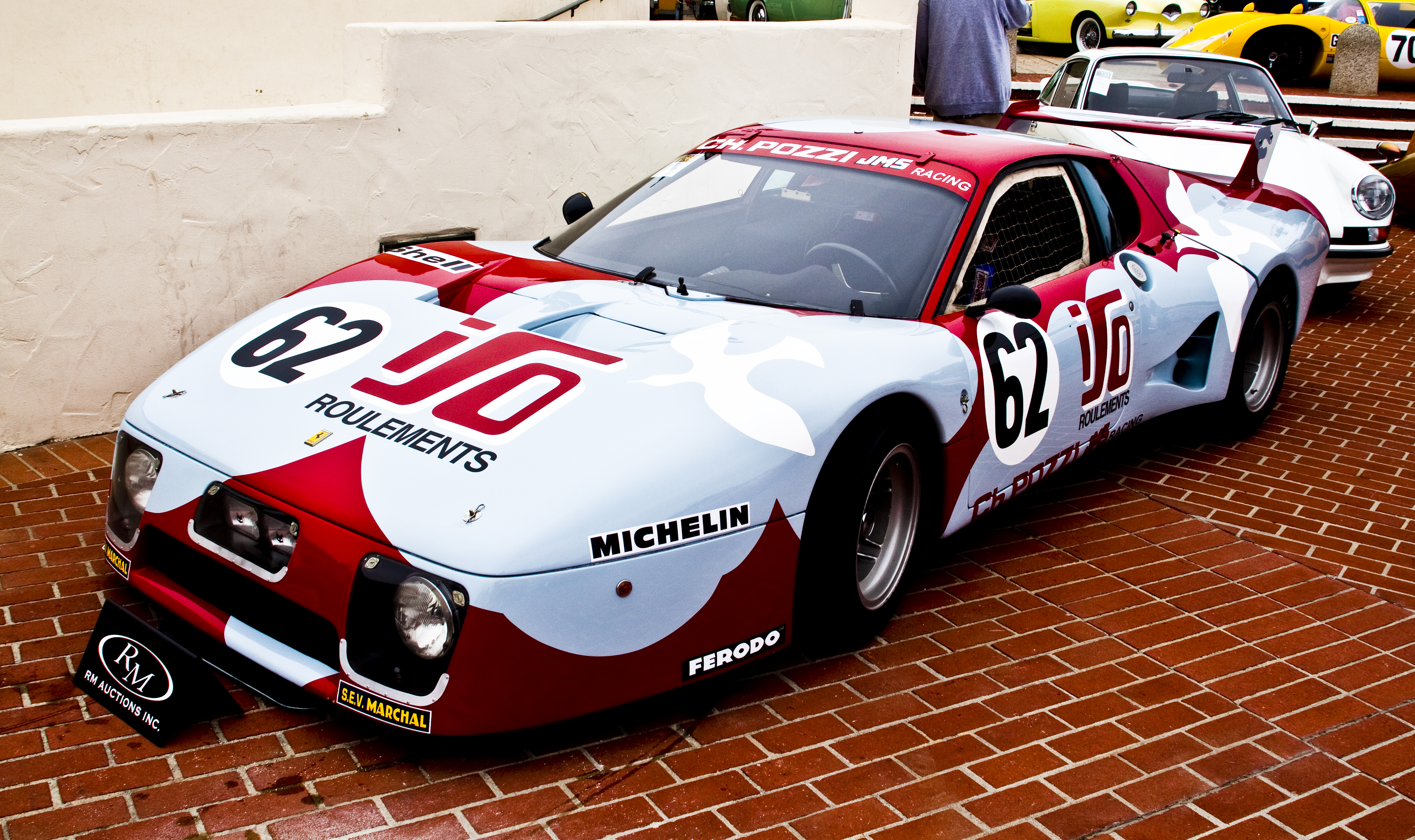
Ferrari 512 BB

Grand Touring Experimental (GTX) is a former classification maintained by IMSA between 1977 and 1982. Some cars were based on FIA Group 5 rules; such as the Porsche 935, and some cars were based on FIA Group 6 regulations, such as the Lola T600. Like the original GTO class, the class rules specified turbocharging and supercharging was allowed on engines up to a size of 6.0 L (370 cu in); with engine design and number of cylinders being free and unrestricted. Engines over 6.0 L (370 cu in) were required to be naturally-aspirated.

=== Cars ===
- BMW 3.0 CSL
- BMW M1/C
- BMW 320i Turbo
- Busby March M1-Chevrolet
- Chevrolet Camaro
- De Tomaso Pantera
- Chevron GTP (B21 with a rear hatch from a C3 Corvette for a windshield)
- DeKon Monza
- Greenwood SuperVette
- Ferrari 512 BB LM
- Kemp Mustang Cobra II
- Ford Zakspeed Mustang Turbo
- Lola T600
- Porsche 934/5
- Porsche 935
- Datsun 280ZX

== Grand Touring Prototype ==
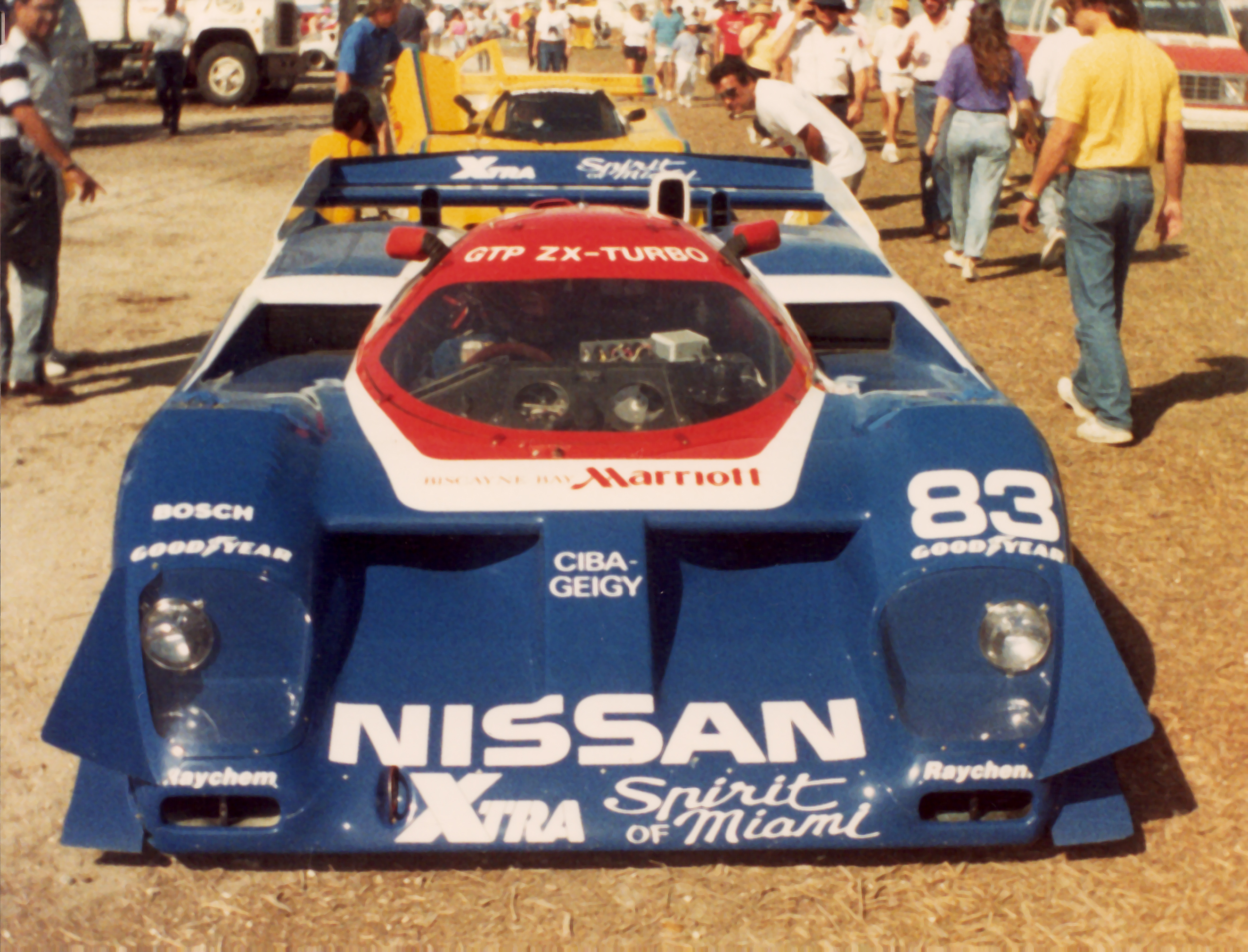
Nissan GTP ZX-Turbo

Grand Touring Prototype (GTP) was maintained by IMSA between 1981 and 1993. The early cars were based on the almost same identical ruleset as the FIA's Group C category, but eventually evolved into a separate category. It was the successor to the Grand Touring Experimental (GTX) class, which were based on FIA Group 5 and Group 6 cars.

The IMSA GTP moniker was revived in 2023 to replace DPi as the top class of the IMSA SportsCar Championship for the merger of DPi and the World Endurance Championship Hypercar class.

=== GTP era ===
Class decal of GTP category

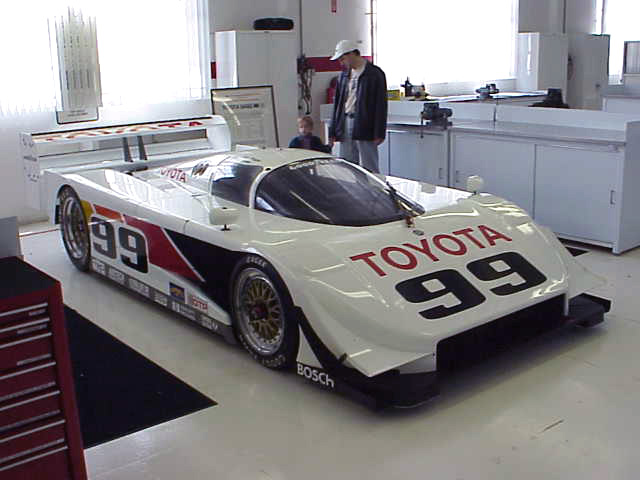
Toyota Eagle Mk.III GTP class car

In 1981, purpose-built GTP cars (Grand Touring Prototypes) appeared in the championship, and were similar to the new FIA Group C cars which would be introduced to the World Endurance Championship from 1982. The main difference between the two categories was that the former had no emphasis on fuel consumption which was highlighted by Derek Bell saying "Race fans do not come to races to watch an economy run." Brian Redman was the first GTP champion, driving a Lola T600 with a Chevrolet engine. March also fielded prototypes, with Al Holbert winning the 1983 championship with a Chevrolet powered car, changing to Porsche power later in the season; and Randy Lanier a year later with Chevrolet power. 1984 also saw the introduction of the Porsche 962, which dominated the series from '85 to '87. Nissan then took control of the series in 1988, but faced challenges from Jaguar, Porsche, and Toyota throughout the next three years. Toyota was quickest in 1992 and 1993, at the end of the GTP era, as Dan Gurney's All American Racers team campaigned the Eagle Mk III, a car so dominant that it has been blamed for the demise of the class. Along with the GTP cars, the Camel Lights cars, a smaller capacity, non-turbocharged, lower powered prototype category was introduced in 1985. Argo Racing Cars was the first 'Lights' Champions, followed by Spice Engineering. Other well known participants were the Tiga, Royale, Alba, Fabcar, and Kudzu.

Starting with the 1986 season, the GTP category had their own decal, which was similar to the IMSA GT side decal, with a P being added to denote their category. Camel Lights cars also used the same decal

There were many other manufacturers in the GTP class, such as URD Rennsport, Spice, Intrepid or Gebhardt, and in the early 1990s, Mazda.

=== Fall of GTP ===
Following a successful heart surgery in 1987, Bishop began to rethink his priorities. He was approached by Mike Cone and Jeff Parker, owners of Tampa Race Circuit. In January 1989, Bishop and France sold the series to Cone and Parker. The new owners relocated the IMSA headquarters from Connecticut to Tampa Bay. Bishop would stand down as president in favor of Mark Raffauf, who was his deputy, and its representative on the ACCUS board. Cone and Parker sold it to businessman Charles Slater. Both lost millions attempting to revive the sagging TV ratings.

By 1992, there were a number of factors that led to the decline of the GTP category. Porsche concentrated on its IndyCar (Porsche 2708) program when critics stated that the Zuffenhausen marque should have built a followup to its 962. Back in 1988, Al Holbert realized that the 962 was beginning to feel dated. He proposed a follow-up open-top Porsche powered racer which would also be sold to customer teams. That project never got off the ground due to Holbert's death in an aircraft accident later in the year. For some, much of the blame was on the organization for allowing the Japanese "works" teams to dominate the series. Under Bishop's original vision, privateers and "works teams" were able to race equally. Privateer teams walked away, while the Japanese economy started to go downhill. These factors led Nissan and Mazda to leave the series. Critics predicted that the decreased variety of cars would disappoint race fans, and in fact, it did finally kill the series in 1993. GTP cars ran their last race on October 2, 1993, at Phoenix International Raceway.

The GTP category was credited for many innovations in the U.S., including anti-lock brakes, traction control, and active suspension. Dave Cowart and Kemper Miller's Red Lobster sponsored team of the early 1980s would innovate race team hospitality, practices which were subsequently adopted by virtually every other team. For those that competed, GTP was recognized for its camaraderie among drivers, especially rivals. But Hans Stuck, commenting in the foreword of the book "Prototypes: The History of the IMSA GTP Series", sarcastically compared the series' camaraderie to Formula One's lack of such.

=== Cars ===
Brand	Chassis	Debut	Applications	Notes
Alba	AR3	1984	GTP Lights	
Alba	AR4	1985	GTP Lights	
Alba	AR8	1986	GTP	
All American Racers	Eagle HF89	1989	GTP	
All American Racers	Eagle HF90	1990	GTP	
All American Racers	Eagle MkIII		GTP	
Argo	JM16	1984	GTP Lights	
Argo	JM19	1985	GTP Lights	
BMW	GTP	1986	GTP	Built off a March 86G.
Chevrolet	Corvette GTP	1984	GTP	
Ferrari	512 BB	1982		
Ford	Mustang GTP	1983	GTP	
Ford	Mustang Maxum GTP	1987	GTP	
Ford	Probe GTP	1985	GTP	
Jaguar	XJR-5	1982	GTP	
Jaguar	XJR-7	1985	GTP	
Jaguar	XJR-9	1988	GTP	
Jaguar	XJR-10	1989	GTP	
Jaguar	XJR-12	1990	GTP	
Jaguar	XJR-16	1991	GTP	
Kudzu	DG-1	1989	GTP Lights	
Kudzu	DG-2	1992	GTP Lights	
Kudzu	DG-3	1993	GTP Lights	
Lola	T600	1981	GTP	
Lola	T610	1982	GTP	
Lola	T616	1984	GTP	
March	82G	1984	GTP	
March	83G	1982	GTP	
March	84G	1983	GTP	
March	85G	1984	GTP	
March	86G	1986	GTP	Used as a base for the BMW GTP, Nissan R86V, and Nissan R88C.
Mazda	757	1986	GTP	
Mazda	767	1988	GTP	
Mazda	767B	1989	GTP	
Mazda	GTP	1983	GTP	
Mazda	RX-792P	1992	GTP	
Nimrod	NRA/C2	1983	GTP	
Nissan	GTP ZX-Turbo	1985	GTP	
Nissan	NPT-90	1990	GTP	
Porsche	962	1984	GTP	
Pratt & Miller	Intrepid RM-1	1991	GTP	
Spice	SE86C	1986	GTP Lights	
Spice	SE88P	1988	GTP, GTP Lights	
Spice	SE89P	1989	GTP	
Spice	SE90P	1990	GTP	
Spice	SE91P	1991	GTP Lights	
Spice	SE92P	1992	GTP	
Tiga	GT286	1986	GTP Lights	
Toyota	88C	1989	GTP	

== Grand Touring Supreme ==
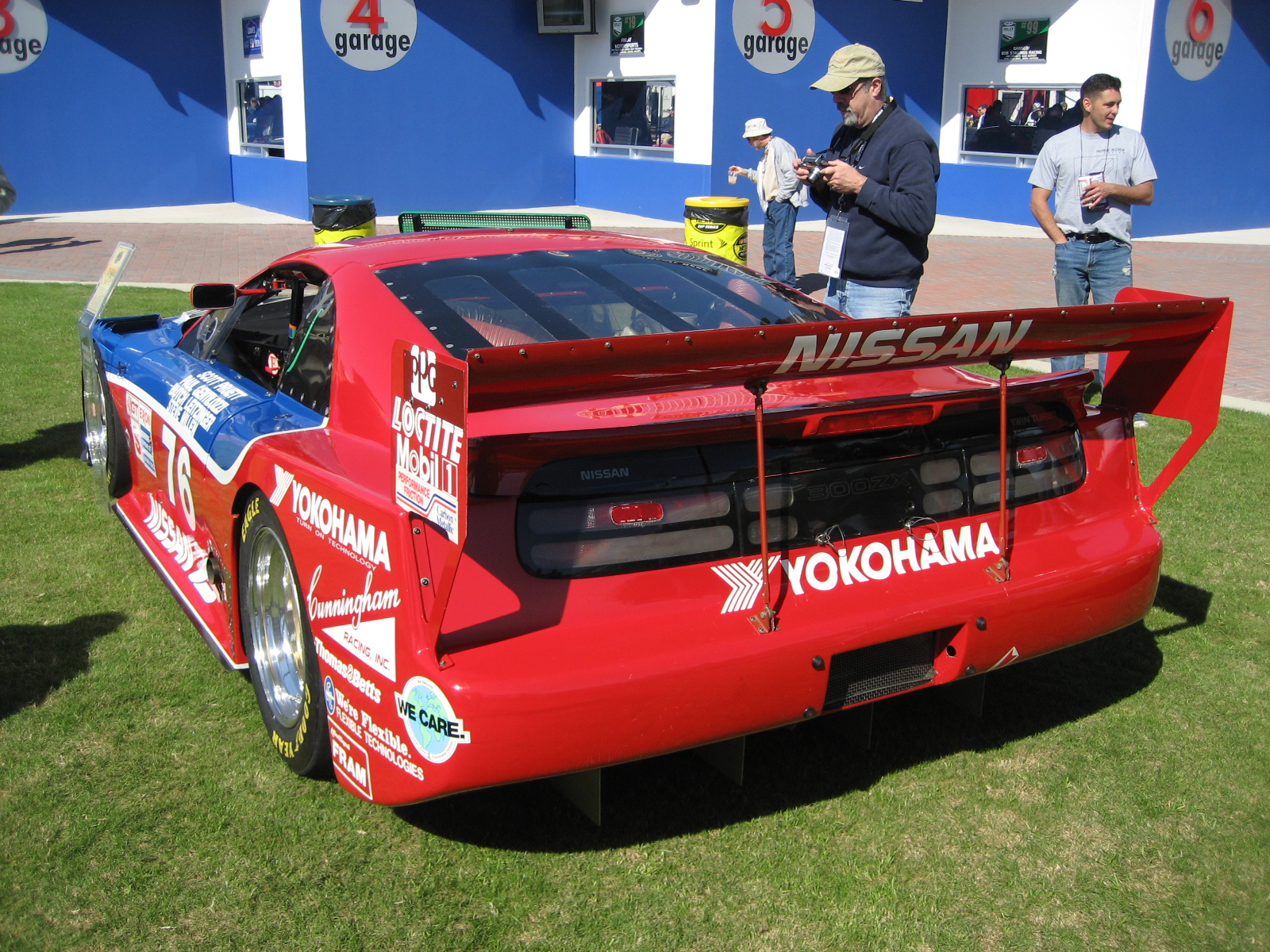
Nissan 300ZX Turbo IMSA GTS

Grand Touring Supreme (GTS) is a former classification originally by IMSA and later by Grand-Am in the Rolex Sports Car Series. IMSA used the class between 1992 and 1997, and Grand-Am used the class between 2001 and 2003. It was an evolution and re-branding of the former Grand Touring Over (GTO) class. Like the original GTO class, the class rules specified an engine displacement of more than 2.5 L (150 cu in), with engine design and number of cylinders being free and unrestricted. Turbocharging and supercharging was allowed on engines up to a size of 6.0 L (370 cu in). Engines over 6.0 L (370 cu in) were required to be naturally-aspirated. Between 1995 and 1996 in the IMSA GT Championship, the top GTS class became known as GTS-1, while the former Grand Touring Under (GTU) class became known as GTS-2. This changed again in 1997, when the GTS-2 (former GTU) class became known as GT3, due to the addition of a new GTS-2 category, which allowed for existing international GT2 cars, like those used in the FIA GT Championship. IMSA also used the GTS designation for the former GT2 class cars of cars (later known as GT1) in the American Le Mans Series, between 1999 and 2004.
