= Spice SE91P =

Sports prototype race car

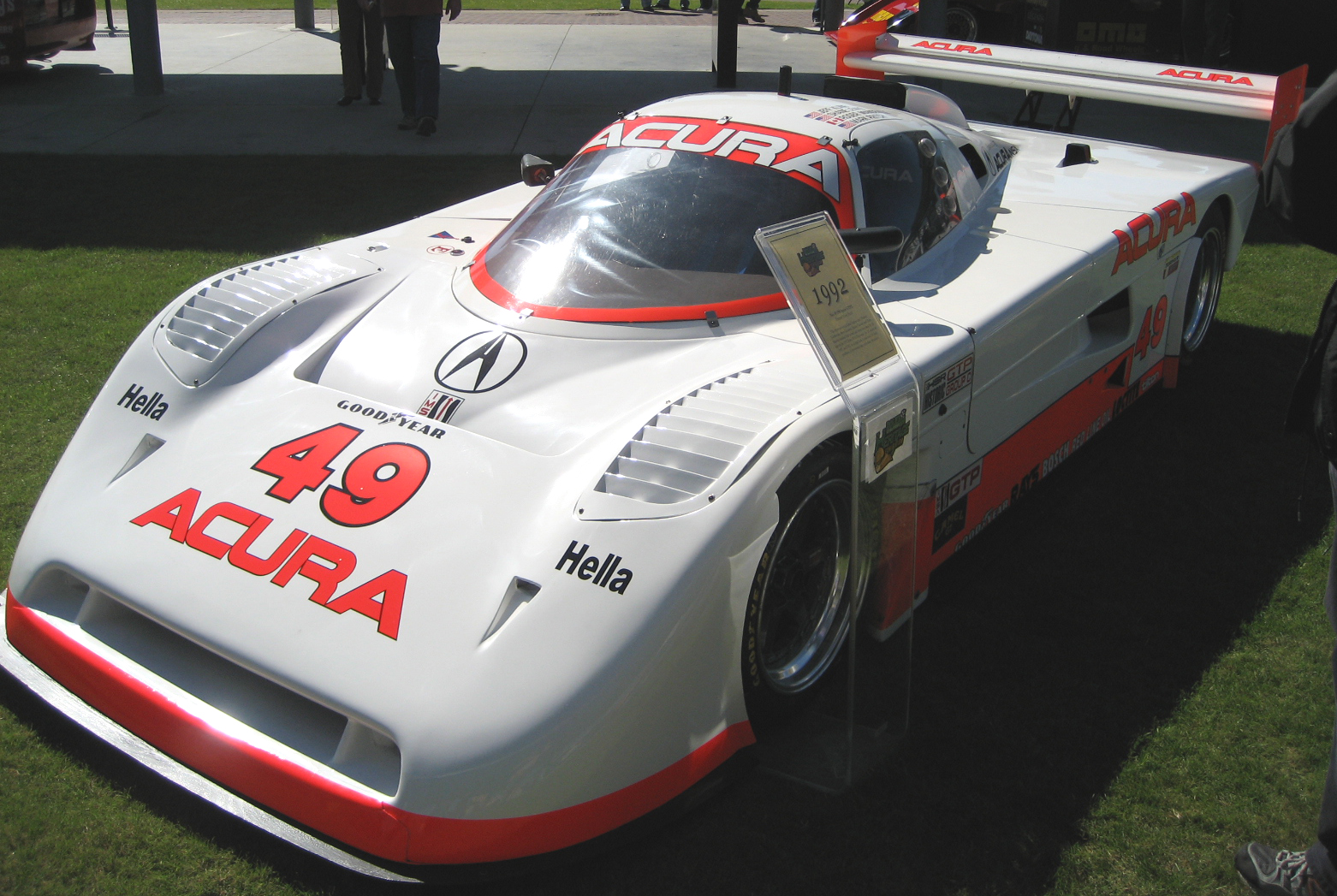
- Category: IMSA GTP Lights
- Designer: Graham Humphrys
- Predecessor: Spice SE90P

Technical specifications
- Chassis: aluminium monocoque with carbon-fibre reinforcements
- Suspension: double wishbones, push-rod actuated coil springs over shock absorbers, anti-roll bar
- Engine: Acura C30A 3.0 L (183.1 cu in) 60° V6, naturally-aspirated, mid-engined
- Transmission: Hewland DGB 5-speed manual
- Power: 425 hp (317 kW)
- Tires: BFGoodrich; Goodyear

Competition history
Entries	Podiums
143	1

The Spice SE91P is an IMSA GTP Lights sports prototype race car, designed, developed and built by British manufacturer Spice Engineering, for sports car racing in the IMSA GT Championship, in 1991.

Designed as the successor to the successful SE90P, the SE91P featured a lightweight aluminium monocoque chassis reinforced with carbon fiber, advanced aerodynamics, and an Acura 3.0L naturally aspirated V6 engine mounted in a mid-rear configuration. Equipped with a Hewland DGB 5-speed manual gear-box, the SE91P produced approximately 425 horsepower, making it a competitive entry in the Lights category.

Despite entering 143 races, the SE91P only achieved one podium finish.
