= Spice SE90P =

Sports prototype race car

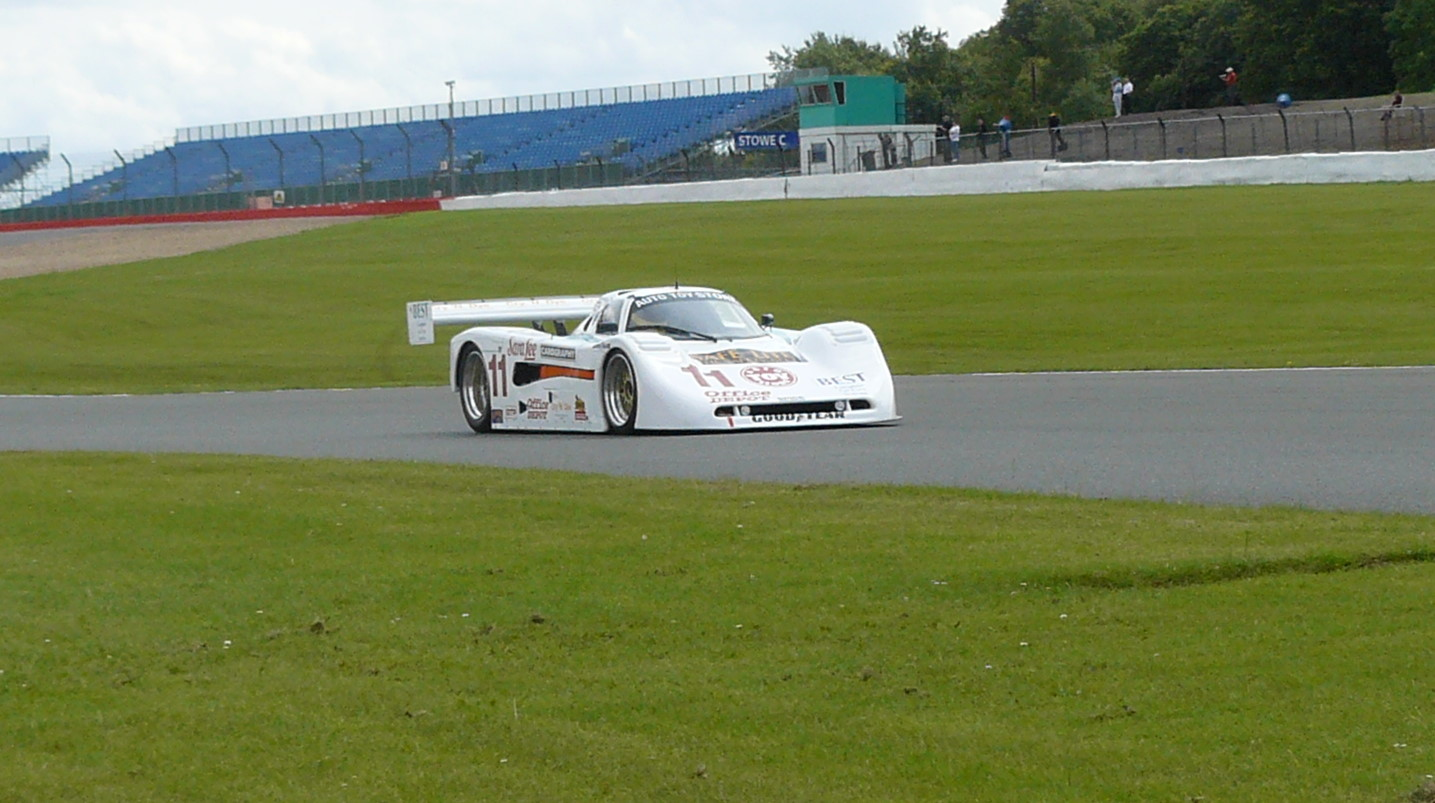
- Category: IMSA GTP
- Designer(s): Graham Humphrys
- Predecessor: Spice SE89P

Technical specifications
- Chassis: Aluminum honeycomb monocoque covered in carbon fiber composite and kevlar body
- Suspension (front): double wishbones, coil springs over shock absorbers, anti-roll bar
- Suspension (rear): double wishbones, rocker-actuated coil springs over shock absorbers, anti-roll bar
- Engine: Acura/Buick/Ferrari/Chevrolet 3.0–6.5 L (183.1–396.7 cu in) V6/V8, naturally-aspirated, mid-engined
- Transmission: Hewland DCB 5-speed manual
- Power: 425–700 hp (317–522 kW)
- Weight: 900 kg (2,000 lb)
- Tires: Goodyear

Competition history
Entries	Podiums	Poles
134	4	5

The Spice SE90P is an IMSA GTP sports prototype race car, designed, developed and built by British manufacturer Spice Engineering, for sports car racing in the IMSA GT Championship, in 1990.
