= Tasch (disambiguation) =

Täsch is a municipality in Visp, Valais, Switzerland.

Tasch may also refer to:

- Tasch Peak, in Antarctica
- Täsch railway station
- Kûrvi-Tasch, a fictional character from Tintin
- Paul Tasch (1910-2001) U.S. paleontologist

== See also ==
- Tack (disambiguation)
- Tach (disambiguation)
- Tash (disambiguation)
- Toch (disambiguation)
- Tosh (disambiguation)
