= Tach (disambiguation) =

A tach or tachometer is a measurement device for RPMs.

Tach may also refer to:

- Triazacyclohexane (TACH), a class of chemicals
- HD Tach (software), a graphing program

== People with the surname ==
- Laura Tach, American academic

== People with the given name ==
- Tach Sharakat, Kalasha of Pakistan, one of the first literate Kalasha

== See also ==
- Taché (disambiguation)
- Taching (disambiguation)
- Tachycardia, a racing heartbeat
- Tack (disambiguation)
- Tash (disambiguation)
- Toch (disambiguation)
- Tock
- Tosh (disambiguation)
