= Tash =

Tash, or TASH may refer to:

== People ==
- Shortened form of Natasha
- Tash Aw (born 1971), Malaysian writer
- Tash Sultana, Australian singer-songwriter and musician
- Tash (rapper), a solo artist and former member of rap group Tha Alkaholiks
- Tash (singer), British/Turkish Cypriot singer
- Tash (surname)
- A nickname for British photographer Alan Lodge
- Frank Tash, pseudonym of American film director Frank Tashlin

== Places ==
- Tash, Iran, a village in Gilan Province, Iran
- Tash-e Olya, a village in Semnan Province, Iran
- Tash-e Sofla, a village in Semnan Province, Iran
- Kiryas Tosh (aka Tash), Boisbriand, Quebec, Canada; a neighbourhood
- Yiddish name of Nyírtass, a Hungarian village

== Other uses ==
- Tash (Narnia), an evil fictional deity in the Narnia stories
- TASH (organization), deals with disability issues
- TASH procedure, a.k.a. Alcohol septal ablation, a treatment of hypertrophic cardiomyopathy
- Tosh (Hasidic dynasty) aka Tash, a Jewish community

== See also ==
- Täsch, a village in Valais, Switzerland
- Taš (disambiguation)
