= Tocher =

Tocher may refer to:

- dowry, in Scots-English

== People ==
- John Tocher (1925–1991) British trade unionist
- K. D. Tocher (1921–1981) British computer scientist
- James Tocher Bain (1906–1988) Canadian engineer
- Richard Toucher Fictional Private Detective

== Places ==
- Tocher, Aberdeenshire, Scotland, UK; see List of United Kingdom locations: To–Tq

== Other uses ==
- Tocher (periodical), a periodical that publishes Gaidhlig-language content; see List of Scottish Gaelic periodicals
- Tocher and Tocher Taxidermists (1906–1968) Anglo-Indian firm in Bangalore, India; founded by William, succeeded by son Herbert, then in turn his son George.

== See also ==
- Sweeney–Robertson–Tocher division
- Toch (disambiguation)
- Tosher (disambiguation)
