= Tosh =

Tosh may refer to:

== People ==
- Tosh (surname)
- Tosh (nickname)
- Tosh Lupoi (born 1981), American college football coach
- Tosh Townend (born 1985), professional skateboarder
- Tosh Van der Sande (born 1990), Belgian professional cyclist

== Places ==
- Tosh, Himachal Pradesh, India; a village
- Kiryas Tosh (a.k.a. Tosh), Boisbriand, Quebec, Canada; a neighbourhood
- Yiddish name of Nyírtass, a Hungarian village

== Entertainment ==
- "Tosh" (song), by the English electronic music band Fluke
- Tosh.0 a comedy show hosted by Daniel Tosh
- Pseudonym of Shun Saeki, artist of Food Wars: Shokugeki no Soma
- Tosh, one of the Goofy Gophers in Warner Bros. cartoons
- Nickname of DC Alfred Lines, a character in the television series The Bill
- Nickname of Toshiko Sato, a character in the television series Torchwood
- Fiona Mackintosh, nicknamed Tosh, a character from the BBC soap opera EastEnders
- Nickname of DS Alison McIntosh, a character from the television series Shetland

== Other ==
- The Orthopedic Specialty Hospital (TOSH), Murray, Utah
- Tosh (Hasidic dynasty), a Hasidic dynasty originating in Nyirtass, Hungary
