= Daniel Georges-Abeyie =

American criminologist (born 1948)

Daniel E. Georges-Abeyie
- Born: April 6, 1948 (age 77); New York City, New York
- Education: Hope College, University of Connecticut, Syracuse University
- Scientific career
- Fields: Criminology
- Institutions: California State University, Bakersfield, Florida State University, Arizona State University West campus, San Jose State University, Prairie View A&M University, Texas Southern University
- Thesis: Arson: The Ecology of Urban Unrest in an American City— Newark, New Jersey, a Case Study in Collective Violence (1975)

Daniel Earl Georges-Abeyie (born April 6, 1948) is an American criminologist and professor in the Barbara Jordan - Mickey Leland School Of Public Affairs at Texas Southern University in Houston, Texas.

== Early life and education ==
Born in New York City, Georges-Abeyie is of West Indian and African American ancestry. His father was from the island of Tortola in the British West Indies, and his mother was a U.S. citizen from the Atlantic coast in the South. Both of his parents were escaped slaves, and his last name refers to both the plantation that his father's ancestor escaped from ("Georges") and the Fante word meaning "return when the time is right" ("Abeyie"). He has traced his lineage back to the Lumbee tribe of Native Americans. He received his B.A. in sociology from Hope College in 1965, his M.A. in sociology from the University of Connecticut in 1971, and his Ph.D. in cultural and political geography from Syracuse University in 1974. As a Ph.D. student, he was heavily inspired by the geographer James L. Newman, who remains his closest mentor and a personal friend.

== Academic career ==
Georges-Abeyie's first teaching position was at the University of Connecticut, where he began working as an instructor the summer after graduating from there with his master's degree in 1971. He later held tenured positions at Southern Illinois University Carbondale, California State University, Bakersfield, and Florida State University before joining the faculty of Arizona State University West in 1992. His most important mentor as a professor was Hans Toch. In 2001, he joined the faculty of San Jose State University, where he was a tenured professor and chair of African-American studies until 2004. He joined the faculty of Prairie View A&M University in 2004 as a professor of psychology, and left it in 2005 to become a tenured professor at Texas Southern University.

== Consulting and activism ==
In addition to his academic positions, Georges-Abeyie has been a consultant to criminal justice agencies in California and Florida, including the Florida Supreme Court's Racial and Ethnic Bias Study Commission. He is also known for working with Amnesty International (AI) in support of their efforts to abolish capital punishment. In the 1990s, he was the Arizona coordinator for AI's campaign to abolish capital punishment. A 1996 Phoenix New Times article described him as "...a world expert and walking encyclopedia on capital punishment", adding that "because of his cool and reasoned manner, his ability to maintain a low and level tone in an argument that raises voices and blood pressures, he has become AI's point man in the western United States." He received multiple awards for his work for AI, including the first Bruce Collmar Award in October 1997 and the Outstanding Amnesty Volunteer Award for the Western Region in 1996. In 2004, he was honored by Pete McHugh, the supervisor of Santa Clara County, California, for his work with AI. McHugh praised Georges-Abeyie for "his commitment to the civil and human rights of all people, and for his untiring efforts to promote peace and harmony in Santa Clara County".

== Research ==
Georges-Abeyie's research focuses on a wide variety of topics, including arson, race and crime, and terrorism. He was also one of several researchers who disputed the "nondiscrimination thesis" posited by criminologist William Wilbanks in the late 1980s.
