= Abeyie =

Abeyie is a surname. Notable people with the surname include:

- Daniel Georges-Abeyie (born 1948), American criminologist
- Quincy Owusu-Abeyie (born 1986), Ghanaian footballer and rapper
- Tim Abeyie (born 1982), British-born Ghanaian sprinter
