= Tosher (disambiguation) =

A tosher is a British sewer hunting scavenger.

Tosher may also refer to:

== Nickname ==
- Tosher Underwood (1878–1960), British footballer
- Tom Smith (footballer, born 1900) or Tosher (1900–1934), British footballer
- Tosher Burns (1902–1984), British footballer
- Paul Tosh or Tosher (born 1973), British footballer
- Tosher Killingback, a competitor at the 1979 Britain's Strongest Man

== Other uses ==
- Tosher, a member of the Tosh Hasidic dynasty
- Tosher, a character from The Day They Robbed the Bank of England
- Tosher Creek, a creek in Kanabec County, Minnesota, US

== See also ==
- Tosh (disambiguation)
