= Meshulim Feish Lowy =

Grand Rebbe of the Tosh hasidic dynasty

Meshilem Feish Lowy II
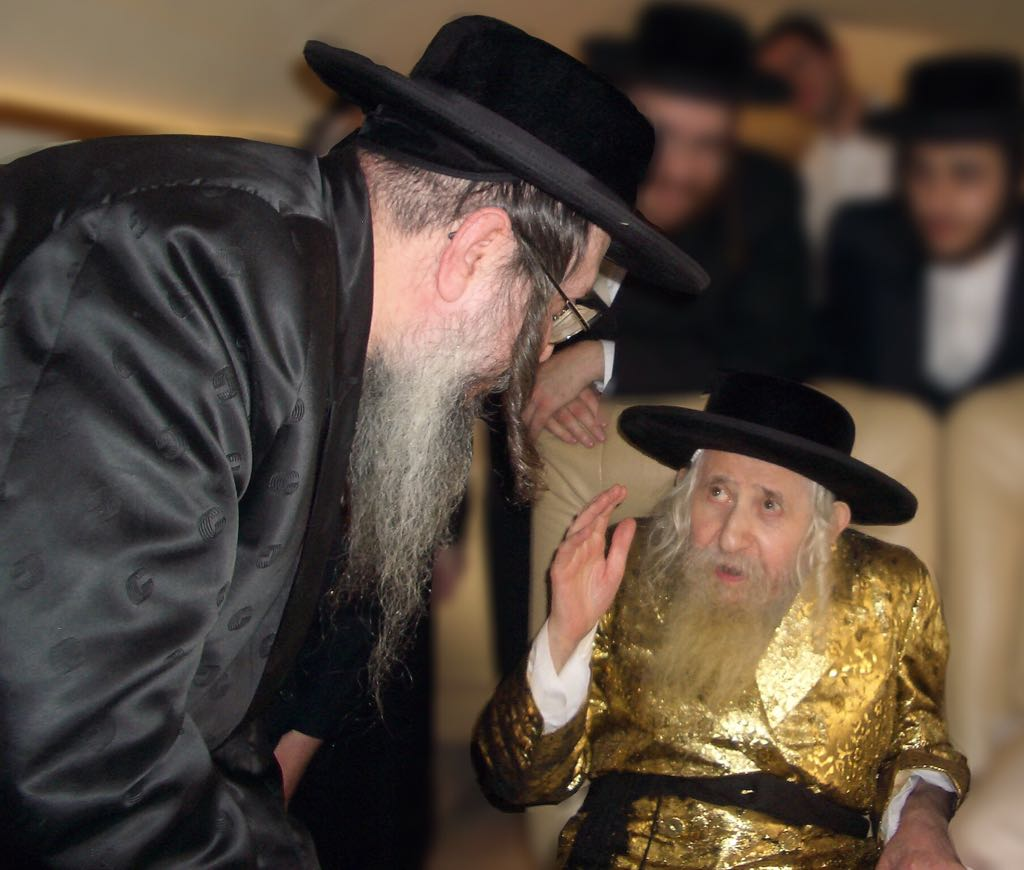
- Born: 11 April 1921; Nyírtass, Kingdom of Hungary
- Died: 12 August 2015 (aged 94); Kiryas Tosh, Boisbriand, Quebec, Canada
- Resting place: Kiryas Tosh Cemetery
- Occupation: Grand Rebbe of the Tosh Hasidim
- Spouse(s): Chavah Weingarten (1946–1996); Malka Haas (2006–2015)

Meshilem Feish Segal Lowy II (Hebrew: משולם פייש סג"ל לאווי, Magyarized: Lőwy Ferencz; 11 April 1921 – 12 August 2015) was the fourth Grand Rebbe of the Tosh Hasidic dynasty.

== Biography ==
=== Early life ===
Lowy was born in Nyírtass, northeastern Hungary. His father Mordecai Márton was the oldest son of Grand Rebbe Elimelech, leader of the native Tosh Hasidim, and his mother Cirel (née Fekete) had been daughter to the chief rabbi of Nyírbátor. He was named after his great-grandfather Meshulim Feish Lowy I (1821 – 1875), the founder of the sect. In 1930, Mordecai was appointed rabbi of Demecser. Upon reaching the age of twelve, the boy was sent to study at the yeshiva of his uncle, Ascher Adolf Lőwy, in Nagykálló. On 2 December 1942 his grandfather died, and Mordecai succeeded him as Grand Rebbe.

In 1943, the young Lowy was drafted into the Labour Service, to which ethnic minorities and "politically unreliable elements" were recruited in lieu of regular military service. He was sent to a labour camp in Kassa, where the inspectors regarded him as insane due to his extreme piety, largely ignoring his conduct and allowing him to maintain a fairly observant lifestyle. Later on he was reassigned to a camp in Margitta. As a Labor Serviceman, he was saved from deportation when German forces entered Hungary on 19 March 1944, while most of his extended family was murdered in Auschwitz during the summer.

In October 1944, Lowy's camp was liberated by the Red Army. He wandered across the country, seeking survivors in Kisvárda, Makó and other cities. In 1946, he married Chava Weingarten. Eventually, the remnants of his father's Hasidim crowned him Rebbe at Nyíregyháza in 1948. Lowy remained in Hungary for a further two-and-a-half years, until the growing threat of the Communist regime motivated him to instruct his followers to leave their country.

=== Canada ===
In spring 1951, Lowy arrived in Montreal, Quebec, Canada, where his surviving older brother Chaim Joseph was already settled. After Passover, the Grand Rebbe established a study hall named "Ohel Elimelech" (Elimelech's Tent) in the city. On 3 October 1952, the "Tasher Congrégation" was officially incorporated. After a decade in Montreal, Lowy began seeking a secluded location in which his Hasidim could be isolated from the influences of society; a model Jewish Ultra-Orthodox enclave, New Square, was built by the Skverer dynasty already in 1956. In 1963 the Tosh community was granted a Can$500,000 loan with which Lowy financed the purchase of a small compound in Boisbriand, Quebec, named "Kiryas Tosh". Eighteen families moved in. By 2015, some 300-400 households numbering over 3,000 members resided in the enclave. As part of his duties as spiritual leader, he also headed the local yeshiva. In addition to his followers in Canada, Tosh communities were established in Brooklyn, London, Antwerp and other cities around the world. By 1999, an estimated 6,000 people lived in those, apart from the Rebbe's own town.

In 1979, Lowy led an attempt to grant Kiryas Tosh an independent municipal status, separating it from Boisbriand. The mayor and local authorities were keen to agree, due to the low tax revenues and high welfare expenditures in the area. Press and public opinion, however, were concerned by the possibility that the sect would codify and enforce laws on religious grounds, and the scheme was scrapped.

Lowy held extreme Ultra-Orthodox positions, common among Eastern Hungarian rabbis, and was close to the Satmar dynasty and the Central Rabbinical Congress. In 1981, when the Rebbe of Belz withdrew from the Congregation of God-Fearers in Jerusalem and announced that his Hasidim should vote for the Knesset and receive Israeli state funds, the Tosher Rabbi stated that "it is forbidden to receive any support from the Zionist heretics... Heaven hath mercy upon us and gave us Joel Teitelbaum, who shined against the darkness wrought by the Zionists, the holy flame which burned all the weeds and pests spreading into the vineyard of the Lord of Hosts."

The Grand Rebbe took an exceptional stance before the 1995 Quebec referendum. While virtually all non-French citizens opposed secession, a Tosh representative voiced full support in the name of Lowy, stating he had taken a favourable approach toward the Parti Québécois already in 1976, when they first formed government. His pro-French attitude engendered much criticism in the wider Jewish public. Two weeks before the vote, Premier Jacques Parizeau paid a celebratory visit to Kiryas Tosh. Eventually, wary not to antagonize the federal government, Lowy's Hasidim split their votes.

Lowy became famous for his piety and the ecstatic manner in which he said his prayers, which took many hours to complete, and benedictions. His court became a site of pilgrimage for Hasidim from other sects, and Orthodox Jews seeking blessing in general. Between 1993 and 2009, his collected writings were compiled and published in a book series named Avodas Avodah ("service of the ministry"; from Numbers 4:47). Ethnographer William Shaffir and textual scholar Justin Jaron Lewis, who studied the Toshers, commented that the Rebbe's books contained the general concepts of Hasidism, stressing mystical and ecstatic approach to religion, which he exemplified, and the need for communion with God, with a secondary focus on writing completely new insights.

Publishing in print was necessitated as the Rebbe's health declined, preventing him from regularly appearing in public.

On 5 September 1996, his first wife Chava died. On 16 January 1997, his firstborn and heir presumptive Mordecai suffered a fatal cardiac arrest. He remarried in 2007 with Malka Haas. A severe case of pneumonia had him hospitalized for a month, in October–November 2010.

Lowy died on 12 August 2015 in Quebec at the age of 94. He was succeeded by his second son and youngest offspring, Rabbi Elimelech Lowy. His older son R' Mordechai died in 1998. He also had four daughters: Cirel Fisch, Bracha Hanna Meyer, Fraidl Sarah Katz and Malka Kahana.
