= Phoenix Raceway =

Motorsport track in the United States

- Dogleg Oval (2011–present)
- Location: 7602 Jimmie Johnson Drive; Avondale, Arizona, United States; 85323
- Coordinates: 33°22′29.1″N 112°18′40.14″W
- Capacity: 42,000
- Owner: NASCAR (November 2019–present)
- Broke ground: September 19, 1963; 63 years ago
- Opened: January 4, 1964; 62 years ago
- Construction cost: $1 million USD
- Former names: ISM Raceway (2018–January 2020); Phoenix International Raceway (1964–1973, 1976–2017); Jeff Gordon Raceway (November 15, 2015); FasTrack International Speedway (January 1973–August 1976)
- Major events: Current: NASCAR Cup Series; Straight Talk Wireless 500 (2005–present); Freeway Insurance 500 (1988–2019, 2026); NASCAR Cup Series Championship Race (2020–2025); NASCAR O'Reilly Auto Parts Series; GOVX 200 (2005–present); Timberland PRO 200 (1999–2019, 2026); NASCAR Xfinity Series Championship Race (2020–2025); NASCAR Craftsman Truck Series; Zero Carbon Bioethanol 150 (1995–present); GM Goodwrench Service Plus / AC Delco 300 (1995–1998); ARCA Menards Series; General Tire 150 (2020–present); Desert Diamond Casino West Valley 100 (1977–1984, 1988–1996, 1998–2015, 2019–present); NTT IndyCar Series; Good Ranchers 250 (1964–2005, 2016–2018, 2026-present); Former: CART; Circle K/Fiesta Bowl 200 (1964–1986)
- Website: phoenixraceway.com

Dogleg Oval (2011–present)
- Surface: Asphalt
- Length: 1.022 mi (1.644 km)
- Turns: 4
- Banking: Frontstretch: 9° Backstretch: 3° Turns 1 and 2: 9° Turns 3 and 4: 11°
- Race lap record: 0:19.7379 ( (Brazil) Tony Kanaan, Dallara DW12, 2016, IndyCar)

Dogleg Oval (1964–2010)
- Surface: Asphalt
- Length: 1.000 mi (1.609 km)
- Turns: 4
- Race lap record: 0:20.791 ( (Netherlands) Arie Luyendyk, Reynard 95I, 1996, IRL)

Road Course (1991–2010)
- Surface: Asphalt
- Length: 1.510 mi (2.430 km)
- Turns: 12
- Race lap record: 0:50.695 ( (Argentina) Juan Manuel Fangio II, Eagle MkIII, 1992, IMSA GTP)

Exterior Road Course (1964–1990)
- Surface: Asphalt
- Length: 2.000 mi (3.219 km)
- Turns: 7

Long Road Course (1964–1990)
- Surface: Asphalt
- Length: 2.700 mi (4.345 km)
- Turns: 14
- Race lap record: 1:44.400 ( (United States) Dave MacDonald, Cooper Monaco King Cobra, 1964, Group 4)

Short Road Course (1964–1990)
- Surface: Asphalt
- Length: 1.400 mi (2.253 km)
- Turns: 7

Phoenix Raceway is a 1 mi (1.6 km) dogleg oval track in Avondale, Arizona, United States. The track has held a variety of events since its opening in 1964, including NASCAR, IndyCar, and CART races. It has a seating capacity of 42,000 as of 2019. Phoenix Raceway is currently owned by NASCAR and led by track president Latasha Causey.

Phoenix Raceway originally opened in 1964 under the control of Richard Hogue as a multi-layout facility. After slow expansion for nearly a decade, the facility was bought out by Phoenix businessman Malcolm Bricklin in 1973 under the General Vehicle brand. The company's ownership was short-lived due to the company's troubles and eventual bankruptcy, and the speedway was bought out by a group of Arizona businessmen led by Bob Fletcher in 1976. After a series of ownership changes from the late 1970s to the early 1980s, the facility oversaw a period of mass expansion under the ownership of Buddy Jobe, who bought the track in 1985 and owned it until 1997, when the International Speedway Corporation (ISC) purchased the facility. Since ISC's purchase, the facility has undergone two major reconfigurations: one in 2011 that altered the track's dogleg and one in 2018 that changed the location of the start-finish line.

== Description ==
=== Configuration ===
Phoenix Raceway in its current form is measured by NASCAR at 1.000 mi (1.609 km), with 9° of banking in the first two turns, 11° of banking in the last two turns, 9° of banking on the frontstretch, and 3° of banking on the backstretch, according to Jayski. The IndyCar Series remeasured the track length to 1.022 mi (1.645 km) after return to the reconfigurated oval track in 2016. The track is known for its frontstretch kink, commonly referred to as a "dogleg" that was added to accommodate the track's original road course, which used parts of the oval alongside specialized portions outside the oval.

When the facility first opened, multiple layouts were included. Alongside the oval track's opening in 1964, a 2.700 mi (4.345 km) road course layout that used both parts of the oval and specialized sections, and a 0.250 mi (0.402 km) dragstrip were included. Additionally, since 1992, an 11-turn infield road course measuring 1.510 mi (2.430 km) was included in the facility's layouts.

Oval track before reconfiguration

Oval track after reconfiguration

Actual track layout with moved S/F-line

=== Amenities ===
Phoenix Raceway is located in Avondale, Arizona, and is served by Avondale Boulevard, which is an exit of Interstate 10. As of 2019, the facility has a capacity of 42,000, according to Forbes. The track also offers a general admission seating area on the side of a hill outside the track's first and second turns; the section is named "Rattlesnake Hill" as a tribute to old stories of Phoenix Raceway officials reportedly having to remove numerous animals before races, including rattlesnakes and scorpions.

== Track history ==
=== Planning and construction ===
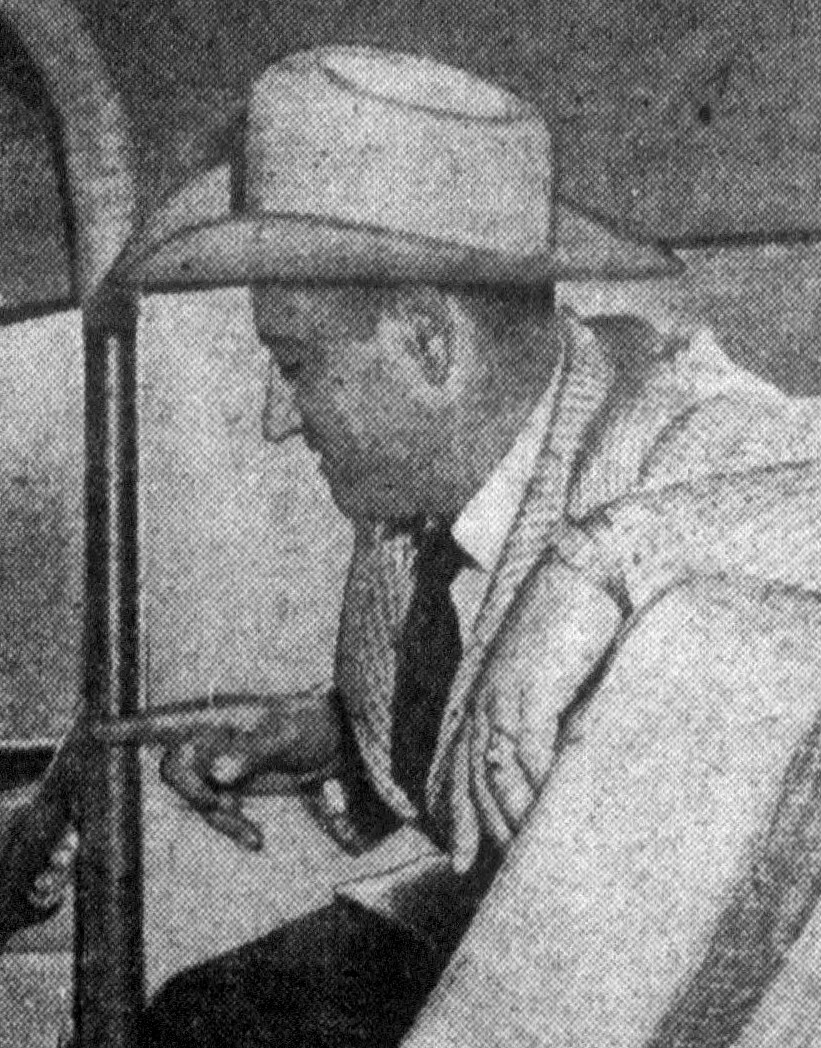
Motorsports promoter J. C. Agajanian (pictured in 1953) convinced track founder Richard Hogue to build an oval on Phoenix Raceway's complex; Hogue's initial plans for the facility only included a road course.

On July 10, 1963, The Arizona Republic's Frank Gianelli reported that a group formed by businessman Richard Hogue acquired a 320-acre (130 ha) plot of land originally used to grow cotton in the Estrella Mountains. With the purchase, the group made plans to build a US$500,000 (about $5,258,152 today) motorsports complex, including a 1.000 mi (1.609 km) oval, a 2.500 mi (4.023 km) road course, and a dragstrip, under the name of Phoenix International Raceway (PIR). Initially, Hogue only originally considered building the road course, but was convinced to add an oval to the facility by racing promoter J. C. Agajanian. The plan immediately faced opposition from the competing Arizona State Fairgrounds, who wished to pave their track in order to continue hosting United States Auto Club (USAC) races despite PIR officials wanting to collaborate with Fairgrounds officials. However, the Fairgrounds' paving plan was vetoed unanimously by the Arizona Fair Commission on August 26. On the same day, the Maricopa County Board of Supervisors passed a permit to begin PIR construction, in the process effectively causing the Fair's shutdown.

Groundbreaking took place on September 19, with Hogue stating in a groundbreaking interview that "we'll be racing by late November or early December." In November, Hogue announced the first events for the track, with Sports Car Club of America (SCCA) and NASCAR Grand National Series events being announced for December and January 1964, respectively. However, the track's opening was pushed back to January 4 due to construction delays. By the end of the year, with paving complete, the facility was approved for SCCA, USAC, and National Hot Rod Association (NHRA) events. At the end of the facility's construction, the entire complex cost approximately US$1 million (about $10,380,901 today) to build.

=== Hogue years ===
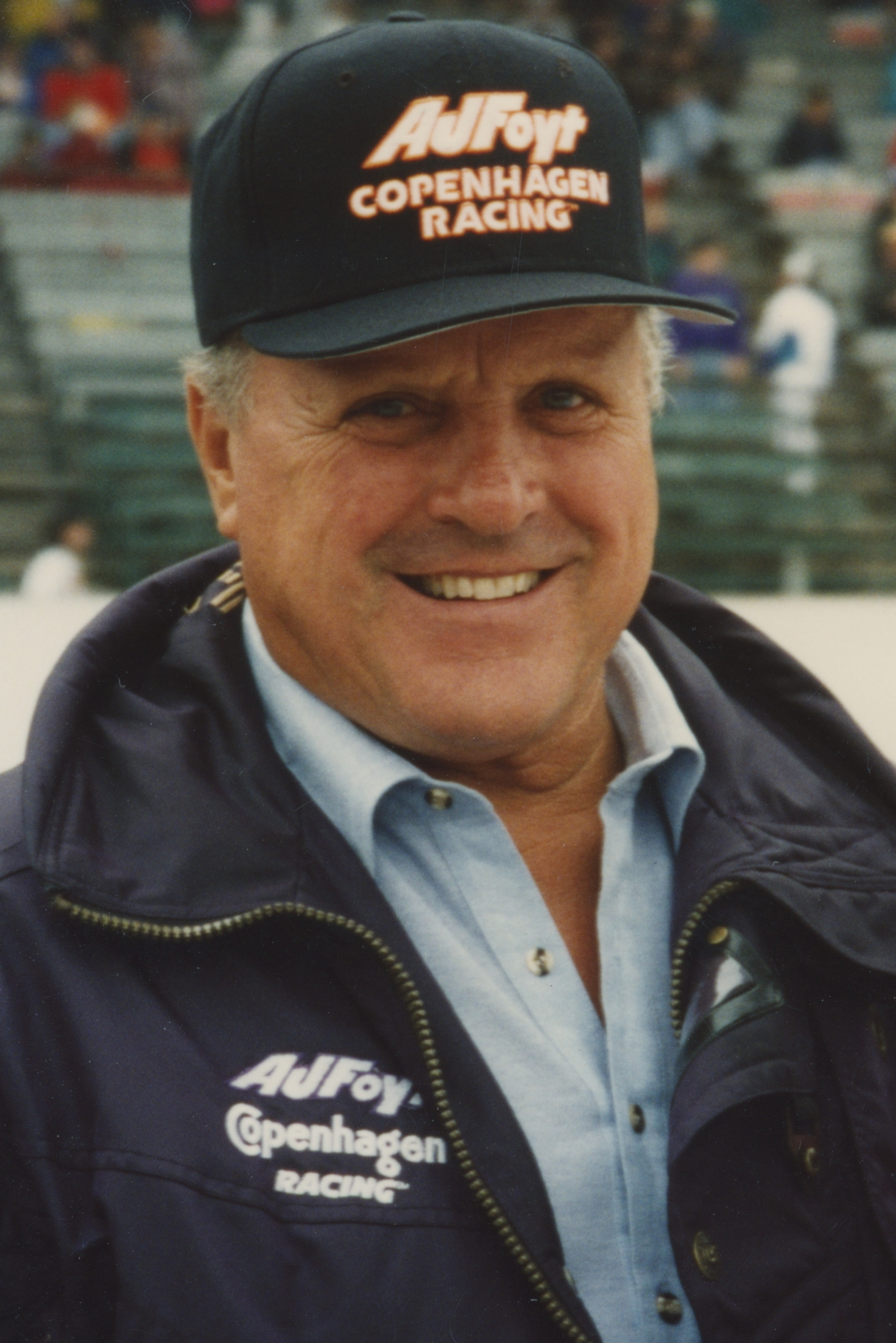
A. J. Foyt (pictured in 1996) won the first race at Phoenix Raceway's oval track in 1964.

PIR opened as scheduled, running informal SCCA events in January 1964. A month later, the first formal events at the facility were held, with Jack Hinkle winning the first highlight race at PIR's road course. PIR received mixed initial reception; although its amenities were praised, some spectators complained about a hidden 50-cent (adjusted for inflation, $5) grandstand fee alongside visibility problems caused by light poles. PIR's drag strip held its first events on March 1. The oval held its first race 21 days later, with A. J. Foyt winning a USAC event. In April, alongside obtaining a sanction from the Fédération Internationale de l'Automobile (FIA), PIR ran its first FIA-sanctioned event, with Dave MacDonald winning a 155-mile (249 km) event.

Initially, PIR struggled with attendance, causing the facility to cancel international events in 1964 due to cost issues. In July, Harry Redkey and Bob Huff, racing promoters of the Manzanita Speedway and Tucson Speedway, respectively, took over operational duties of PIR, with Huff stating hopes of implementing "a series of major improvements" and a seating expansion to 13,500 at the facility. By November, renovations to the facility's grandstand and walls were made. However, the facility still faced heavy traffic issues in the Bobby Ball Memorial event that took place in the same month, partially causing the cancellation of a USAC stock car race in early 1965. Traffic improvements to PIR were completed in March 1965 alongside the widening of the track's surface in the turns. In June, a US$10,000 renovation to PIR's dragstrip that aimed to install increased lighting started. By the end of 1965, Hogue stated in a response to a PIR critic in a letter to the editor that PIR invested over US$100,000 in renovations, including a refurbished main grandstand and the addition of 2,000 seats.

PIR experienced numerous crashes resulting in serious injury or death in its early years. In its first ever dragstrip event on March 1, PIR experienced its first fatality when drag racer Robert Snyders crashed during a qualifying run on the drag strip. In early December, Bobby Marshman succumbed to second- and third-degree burns suffered during a tire testing crash on November 27. In August 1965, the dragstrip oversaw its second fatality when 17-year-old Phil Miner lost control of his car and crashed at approximately 160 miles per hour (260 km/h). In February 1967, 13-year-old Maurice Gallegos suffered major head injuries after hitting a truck during a go-kart race; Gallegos survived the incident and later sued PIR for US$1,687,624 (about $16,295,172 today) for "inadequate and ineffectual protection" and a lack of "prompt and adequate assistance after the accident". On February 27, 1972, United States Air Force captain Bruce Helfert died in a sports car crash on the facility's road course.

=== Nancy Hogue era ===
Sometime between 1965 and 1967, Richard Hogue and his wife, Nancy, divorced. By February 3, 1967, Nancy was described in The Arizona Republic as the sole owner of PIR. On the 15th, racing promoter J. C. Agajanian took over Redkey and Huff as the promotional director of PIR. Two days later, Nancy filed an injunction order against Redkey and Huff for "fail[ing] to return... the corporate's properties, papers and records." She also revealed that she fired the duo as they spent "extravagant amounts of money for travel, hotels, entertainment, telephone calls, salaries, etc." In response, the duo sued Hogue for US$200,000 (about $1,931,138 today) on March 2 for multiple claims, including breach of contract, claims of Nancy deceiving the duo, and Nancy refusing to give any stock to the duo despite an agreement.

By October 1967, the Arizona Daily Star claimed that grandstand seating had expanded to 25,000. On January 23, 1968, PIR held its first major stock car racing events, with Don White winning a USAC event. In March, Agajanian confirmed discussions about removing PIR's backstretch dogleg from its oval track, stating that the corner was "dangerous as hell". Three months later, the decision was confirmed by Jerry Raskin, PIR's public relations official, with the backstretch becoming a straight line. Reportedly, the reconfiguration was complete by September; however, the claim that the dogleg was ever removed has been disputed by racing historian Kevin Triplett, who did not find any evidence that the reconfiguration ever happened. In October 1969, construction of a two-year, US$100,000 (about $877,949 today) renovation project focusing on additional seating and track adjustments was completed. A year later, Phoenix hotel businessman Charlie Alexander signed a three-year lease from Nancy to become the racing director of PIR. In 1972, in response to criticism from the previous year of a dangerous and slippery track surface, track officials started putting down a traction compound to combat the issue; the fix was received well by driver Bobby Unser.

=== Short-lived FasTrack rebrand ===
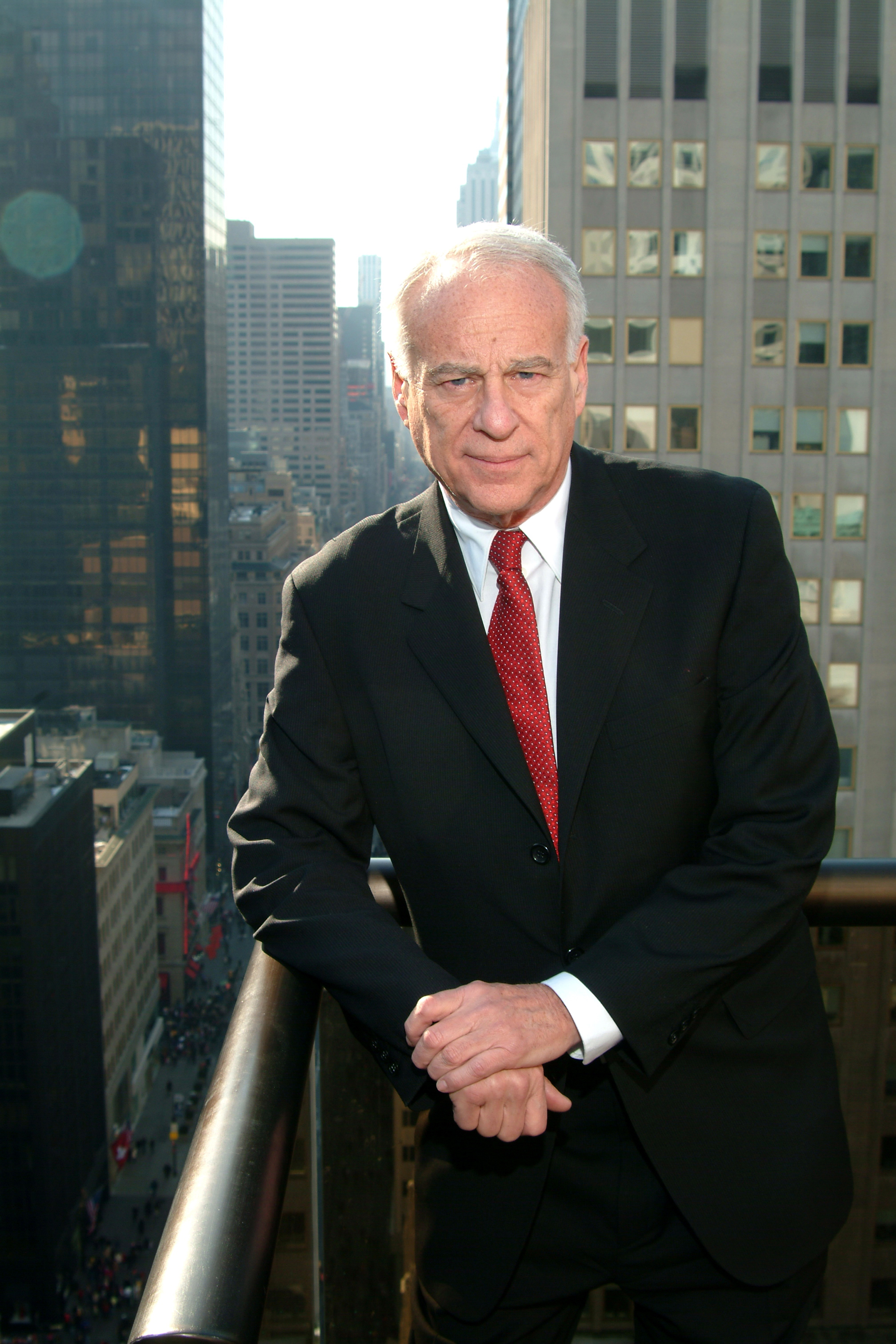
Malcolm Bricklin (pictured in 2007) and his company, General Vehicle, purchased the facility in 1973. The company's ownership was short-lived due to financial troubles with General Vehicle.

On December 6, 1972, the Arizona Republic reported that Nancy Hogue sold PIR to Newport Beach, California, businessman Paul O'Shea. However, nine days later, the Republic retracted their claim, stating that the facility was instead bought by the Malcolm Bricklin-owned General Vehicle Inc., with O'Shea assisting with the company's purchase; it was also announced that Alexander was ousted from his lease on the facility. In a press conference held on January 23, 1973, newly appointed track president Anthony Kopp announced the track's rebranding to "FasTrack International Speedway" as part of Bricklin's FasTrack brand, a subsidiary under General Vehicle. Kopp also announced plans for US$30,000 worth of renovations, including the expansion of permanent seating capacity to 16,000, the construction of a new pit road, and other miscellaneous amenity improvements. Two months later, the facility experienced its fifth fatality when driver Bob Criss died in a practice crash for a USAC event.

General Vehicle soon after its purchase of PIR experienced major financial difficulties, primarily related to the problems of the General Vehicle-manufactured Bricklin SV-1. As a result, by April 1975, FasTrack International Speedway director Russ Kurtz stated in the Arizona Daily Star that the facility had been on sale "for a number of months"; however, he also stated that he did not see the track being sold in the near future. General Vehicle filed for reorganization on October 1, leaving FasTrack in a state of "limbo". In December, Bricklin resigned from General Vehicle, and the company and its subsidiaries was declared bankrupt by federal bankruptcy judge Edward Davis on January 12, 1976, with Bricklin in a reported US$34.6 million in debt. Davis also ruled to let FasTrack International Raceway to continue hosting races to pay off creditors.

=== Fletcher and Wood years ===
By early May 1976, numerous offers to purchase the facility were made, including an offer from an unspecified buyer for $200,000 and another $375,000 offer from a group led by Bill Moore. However, all were either withdrawn by prospective buyers or rejected by the court. After rejecting another offer of $280,000, Davis gave control of the facility to lienholders Nancy Hogue and First Pennsylvania Bank, leaving an uncertain future for the facility despite a potential offer from J. C. Agajanian. However, on August 18, the Republic reported that a group led by Bob Fletcher, Tom Taber, and Bill Hardy bought the facility at an undisclosed price; it was later revealed to be "in the neighborhood of $400,000" according to Taber. With the purchase, the track's name was reverted to "Phoenix International Raceway", with the group promising renovations to existing grandstands, garages, and media centers alongside a wider variety of events. In 1977, the track's surface was repaved and completed by October of that year. In the same year, the first NASCAR-sanctioned race occurred at the facility, with Cale Yarborough winning a NASCAR Winston West Series (now known as the ARCA Menards West Series) event on November 27. The following year, the facility oversaw its sixth fatality, with driver Otis D. Hurley dying in a sports car crash during a practice session on the facility's road course.

In 1980, under threats from the track's owners to permanently shut down PIR due to owner disputes, PIR general manager Dennis Wood and contractor Bill Krug signed a three-year lease to run the facility. In a 1998 interview, Wood admitted he had little income at the time and had only obtained the lease because "my only thought at the time was we can't shut PIR down". A year later, Wood alongside California businessman Warner W. Hodgdon bought the facility from Fletcher within the "seven-figure" price range. Hodgdon's ownership was short-lived; in January 1983, Wood bought Hodgdon's 75% share of ownership, stating that the two had "philosophical differences" over how to run the facility. Wood later added Fletcher back as a partner for $1 as a sign of gratitude for Fletcher's "friendship and kindness toward me over the years". In 1985, after an IndyCar race was cancelled due to concerns of a deteriorating track surface with a new IndyCar model, track officials approved a repave of the oval track. That same year, James Haynes died during the Copper World Classic, becoming the seventh fatality at the facility.

=== Buddy Jobe era, mass expansion ===
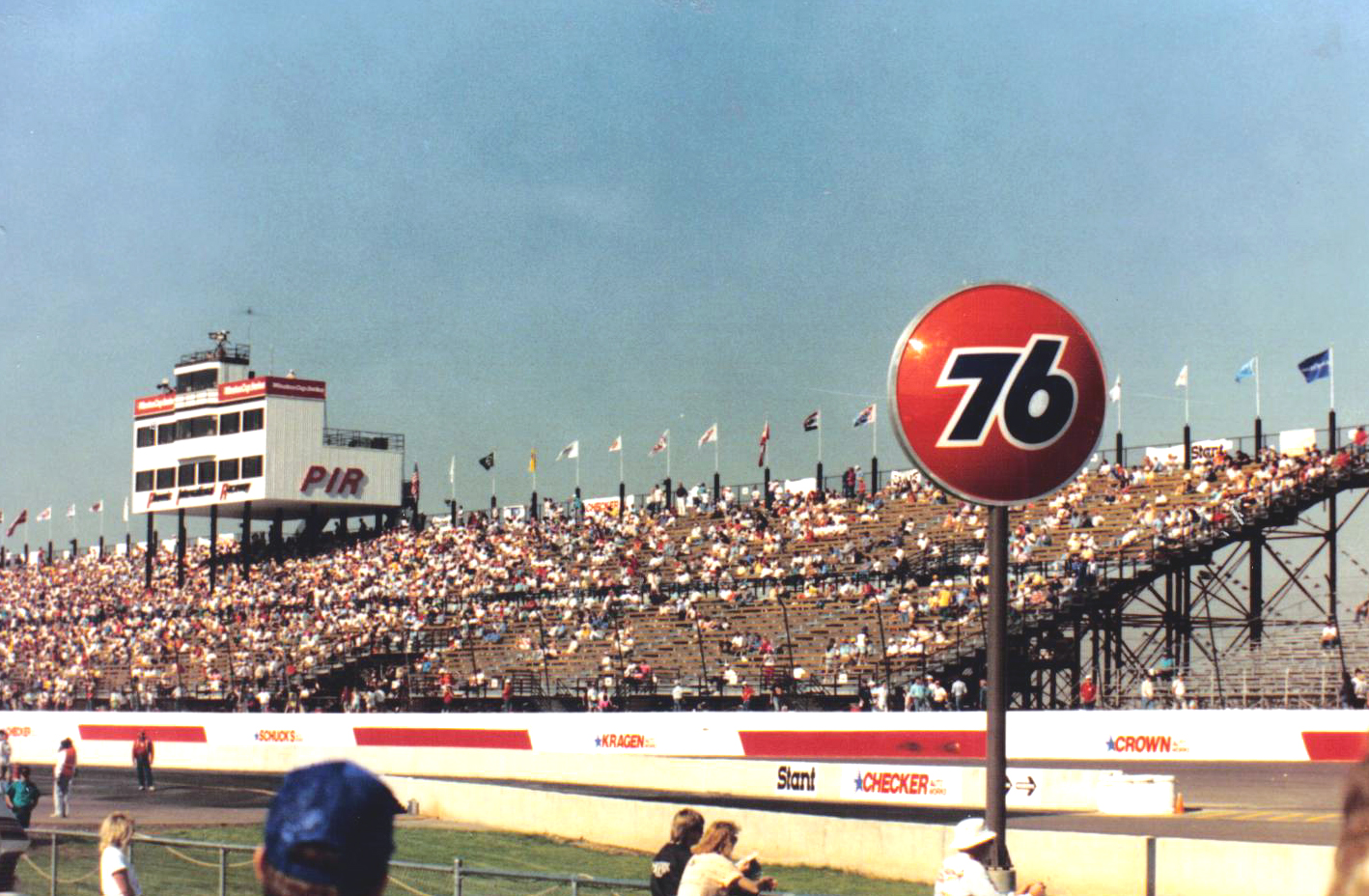
Phoenix Raceway's frontstretch grandstands in 1989. The grandstand was built in 1987 after fires burnt down a majority of the original grandstand.

On August 23, 1985, Wood stated to the Republic that an agreement was reached with an unspecified buyer to purchase PIR. Two days later, the buyers were revealed to be farmer Emmett "Buddy" Jobe and accounting firm owner Patrick Johnson, with ownership officially transferring to the duo in September. With the purchase, the duo promised an increase in permanent seating capacity from 10,400 to "between 20,000 and 25,000" alongside starting negotiations to obtain a NASCAR Busch Grand National Series race. In February 1986, Jobe bought out Johnson's share of ownership, becoming the sole owner of the facility. Within the months of April to September 1986, $400,000 worth of renovations were made, including the addition of a pedestrian bridge over the third and fourth turns connecting the infield to outside viewing areas and additional concrete barriers. In 1987, two separate fires less than a month apart affected the facility's grandstands. The first occurred on April 26 due to a lightning strike, burning around 40% of the frontstretch grandstands. While plans were initiated to both repair and expand seating capacity, in June, another fire affected the frontstretch grandstands; this time due to a blowtorch construction accident. In response, Jobe announced the construction of an enlarged grandstand made out of steel and aluminum with a capacity of 10,000.

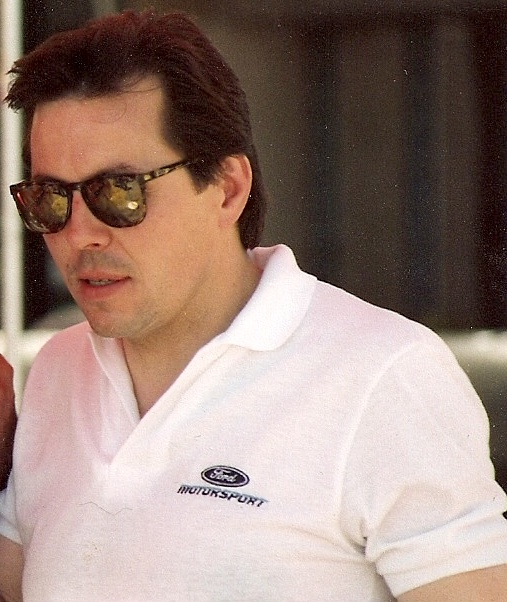
Alan Kulwicki (pictured in 1991) won the first NASCAR Cup Series race at Phoenix Raceway in 1988.

On November 30, NASCAR spokesman Les Richter announced that PIR was awarded a NASCAR Cup Series race weekend for the following year. To accommodate NASCAR, a $5 million renovation project was implemented, building a new VIP hospitality building, renovating the garage area, extending pit road by 240 ft (73 m), and expanding permanent seating capacity to 30,000 in time for the 1988 Checker 500. The first Cup Series race at the facility ran as scheduled on November 6, with Alan Kulwicki winning the event. The following year, another $2 million was spent on expansion, constructing a four-story VIP suite building on the track's first turn, the expansion of permanent seating capacity to "about 42,000", renovations to the facility's scoring tower and media center, and other upgrades related to beautification. In 1990, plans were drafted to add a 5,000-seat grandstand alongside the construction of a new infield road course, with the latter being completed two years later. The facility underwent a $800,000 refurbishment in 1991, adding 700 luxury seats and increased infield parking. That same year, PIR experienced its eighth fatality when USAC Silver Crown Series driver Danny Milburn crashed during a Silver Crown race. In 1993, PIR ran its first night race, installing temporary lights to run a IMSA GT Championship race. By 1995, seating capacity increased to "nearly 60,000", with Jobe stating that he had invested over $10 million (adjusted for inflation, $21,129,067) into the facility. In 1997, Arizona Governor Fife Symington approved state funding for a five-lane bridge to be built over the Gila River that addressed long-lasting traffic concerns.

=== ISC purchase ===
The first rumors of a potential sale of PIR came in November 1996, with the Bruton Smith-owned Speedway Motorsports, Inc. (SMI) being named as potential buyers; according to the Republic. Both Jobe and SMI spokesman Humpy Wheeler denied the rumor, with Jobe stating he was getting "a little irritated" at the rumor. Jobe reaffirmed his position in another Republic interview on March 22, 1997, stating, "How much stronger can I make this? I'm not selling." However, on July 14, the Republic reported that PIR was "likely" purchased by the Florida-based International Speedway Corporation (ISC). The purchase was confirmed in a press conference that same day, with ISC paying $46 million for the facility; Jobe remained as the president of PIR. In 1998, a new 5,000-seat grandstand in the track's second turn named in honor of Bobby Allison was announced to increase seating capacity to "more than 72,000". Three years later, a new scoring pylon was built to replace the tower built in 1988. In 2002, Jobe retired as president of PIR, with Watkins Glen International president Bryan Sperber replacing Jobe as president of PIR. The following year, the track's dogleg was also reconfigured, with the dogleg being made wider for both increased safety and passing opportunities. The turn two wall was also extended to fully enclose the track. The project started in May and was completed in October for testing. In December, PIR began installing SAFER barriers around the oval track's perimeter; the installation was complete by January 2004.

PIR officials began lobbying for a second NASCAR Cup Series race weekend in February 2003. Despite Sperber stating the track was not seeking to install permanent lighting in January 2003, PIR officials initiated negotiations with Arizona politicians to use tax revenue to construct lights and other road renovations in further efforts to allure a second Cup Series weekend. After failing to receive it for 2004, a second Cup Series weekend for 2005 was officially awarded on May 14 after Arizona government officials approved an allocation of $5 million in state funding to renovate roads near PIR. A $5 million permanent lighting system to host night racing was installed soon after, being completed in March 2005. In 2006, new amenities were constructed, including an extension of the Allison Grandstand to 14,000 seats and a new luxury lounge. In 2010, seating capacity was reduced to 55,000 when seats were widened to 22 in (56 cm).

=== 2011 reconfiguration and 2018 renovations ===
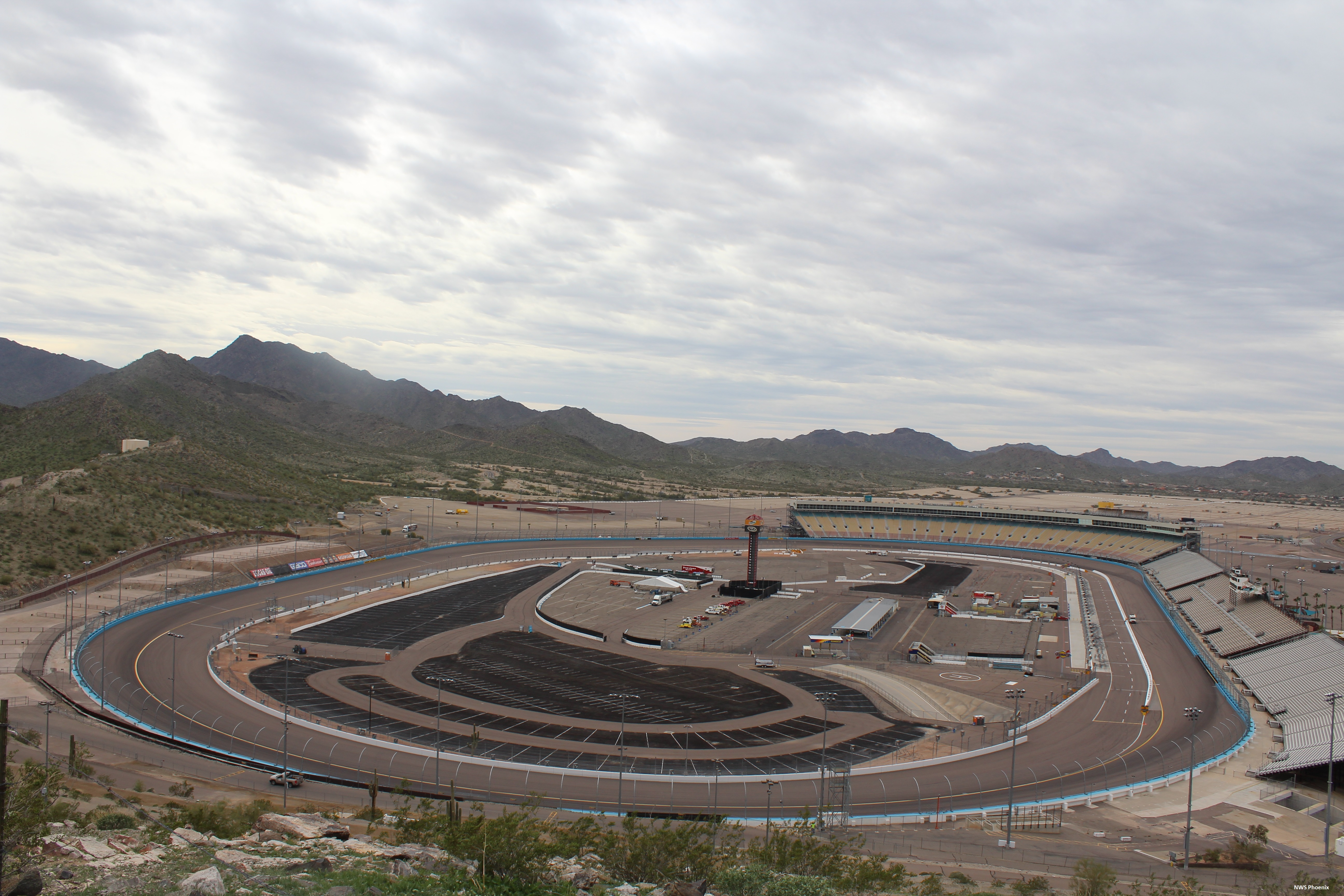
Phoenix Raceway (pictured in 2017) after the 2011 reconfiguration.

On November 19, 2010, ISC officials announced a $100 million long-term project aimed at PIR's "development". Approximately four months later, PIR track officials announced a repave and reconfiguration of the oval track; among said changes stated were the widening of the frontstretch by 10 ft (3.0 m) to 62 ft (19 m), the track's pit road being pushed back, and the dogleg being "pushed out" by 95 ft (29 m). Additionally, the apron underneath the dogleg, which at the time was covered in grass, was paved over, subsequently leading to drivers often cutting the dogleg apron. A ceremonial groundbreaking ceremony featuring driver Jeff Gordon breaking the old pavement apart with an excavator was held on February 27, and construction began by April. The repave was completed by October of that year for testing, and it received positive reactions from numerous drivers, including Tony Stewart and Carl Edwards. Despite changes, both attendance and seating capacity continued to decline; by 2014, capacity decreased further to 50,000 according to the Republic.

On November 17, 2016, NBC Sports reported that PIR officials submitted a renovation project for ISC officials to approve. 13 days later, the ISC board of directors approved the $178 million project. Within the project, plans were made to demolish the frontstretch grandstands, extend the Allison Grandstand, redesign the track's infield, shift the start-finish line to after turn two and before the dogleg, add additional suites, and implement other modernization improvements. (Note: Attributed to multiple references:) In September 2017, Ingenuity Sun Media (ISM) bought the naming rights for PIR starting in 2018, with the track being renamed to "ISM Raceway". On August 20, 2018, Sperber announced his retirement as president of the facility, with ISC Design & Development director of business operations Julie Giese being named as Sperber's replacement. The renovation project was completed in time for the 2018 Can-Am 500. In 2019, seating capacity decreased to 42,000 according to ISC archive records. That same year, ownership of the facility was transferred to the sanctioning body of NASCAR when ISC was bought out by NASCAR. The following year, ISM and the speedway ended their naming rights relationship despite a 10-year deal, with the track renaming itself to "Phoenix Raceway". In November 2022, Giese stepped down as president of Phoenix Raceway to run operations for the Chicago Street Course, with Bell Bank executive Latasha Causey taking over the position.

== Events ==
=== Racing events ===
==== NASCAR ====
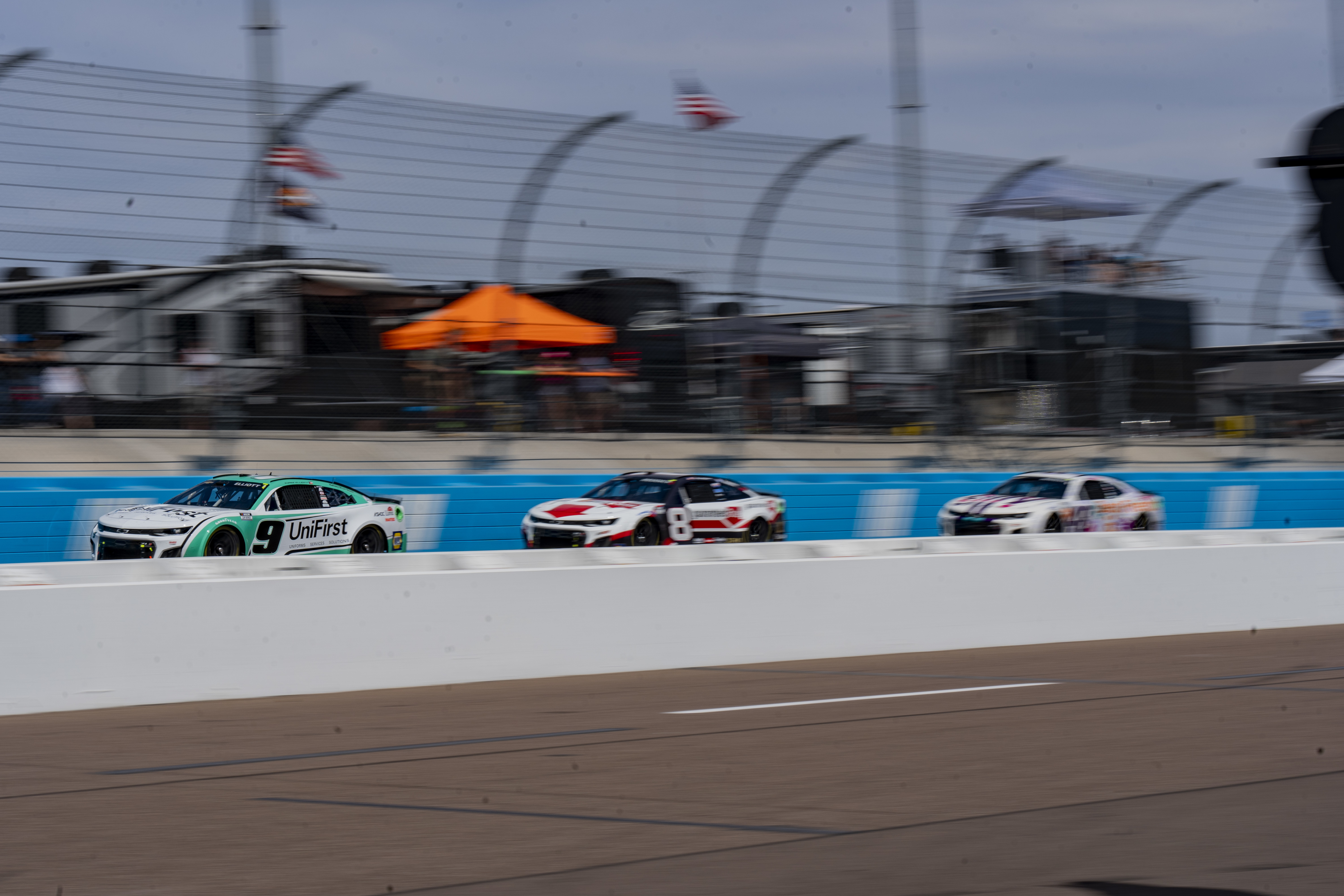
A NASCAR Cup Series race at Phoenix Raceway in 2022. Since 1988, the facility has held at least one Cup Series weekend annually.

The track hosts two annual NASCAR race weekends: the Straight Talk Wireless 500 and the fall Freeway Insurance 500. The facility also features support events from the NASCAR O'Reilly Auto Parts Series and the NASCAR Craftsman Truck Series, including the GOVX 200, the Timberland PRO 200, and the Zero Carbon Bioethanol 150. In 2020, the fall events were moved from being the penultimate race of the season to the final race, replacing Homestead–Miami Speedway as the championship venue for all three NASCAR national series. However, after six years, the championship race is scheduled to Homestead–Miami Speedway in 2026.

==== Open-wheel racing ====
Phoenix Raceway has held numerous open-wheel racing events under various sanctioning bodies: primarily under the United States Auto Club (USAC), Championship Auto Racing Teams (CART), and IndyCar. Until the mid-1980s, the facility held two annual open-wheel races a year: the Jimmy Bryan Memorial and the Bobby Ball Memorial. Both iterations were inaugurated in 1964, and were held annually by USAC until 1979, when both events were taken by CART. The Bobby Ball Memorial ran until 1986, when it was dropped from the 1987 CART season.

After 1986, the Jimmy Bryan Memorial was held and organized by CART until 1996, when control of the event was turned over to the Indy Racing League (IRL) in the midst of the CART–IRL split. The race remained on the schedule until 2005, when it was dropped for the 2006 season. Open-wheel racing did not come back to Phoenix Raceway until 2016, when IndyCar, formerly the IRL, returned. However, the event was dropped after 2018; according to IndyCar, the reason was due to poor attendance "despite considerable investment from both sides".

In 2025, it was announced that IndyCar will return to Phoenix in 2026, sharing a weekend with NASCAR.

==== Other racing events ====
- From 1977 until 2009, Phoenix Raceway hosted the annual Copper World Classic, a multi-division race weekend.
- From 1992 to 1995, Phoenix Raceway hosted an annual IMSA GT Championship race.

=== Non-racing events ===
Phoenix Raceway has held various EDM music festivals since the 2020s, including the Goldrush Music Festival, Decadence Arizona, and PHXLIGHTS.

== Lap records ==
As of November 2024, the fastest official race lap records at Phoenix Raceway are listed as:

Category	Time	Driver	Vehicle	Event
Dogleg Oval (2011–present): 1.022 mi (1.645 km)
IndyCar	0:19.7379	Tony Kanaan	Dallara DW12	2016 Desert Diamond West Valley Phoenix Grand Prix
Indy Lights	0:22.5541	Kyle Kaiser	Dallara IL-15	2016 Indy Lights Grand Prix of Phoenix
NASCAR Cup	0:26.450	Denny Hamlin	Toyota Camry	2019 Bluegreen Vacations 500
NASCAR Truck	0:26.774	Zane Smith	Chevrolet Silverado	2020 Lucas Oil 150
NASCAR O'Reilly	0:27.234	Justin Allgaier	Chevrolet Camaro	2018 DC Solar 200
ARCA Menards	0:27.313	Connor Zilisch	Chevrolet Camaro SS	2024 Desert Diamond Casino West Valley 100
Dogleg Oval (1964–2010): 1.000 mi (1.609 km)
Indy Racing League	0:20.791	Arie Luyendyk	Reynard 95I	1996 Dura Lube 200
CART	0:21.240	Emerson Fittipaldi	Penske PC-24	1995 Slick 50 200
Indy Lights	0:23.227	Greg Moore	Lola T93/20	1995 Phoenix Indy Lights round
Formula Atlantic	0:24.012	Richie Hearn	Ralt RT41	1995 Phoenix Formula Atlantic round
Road Course (1991–2011): 1.510 mi (2.430 km)
IMSA GTP	0:50.695	Juan Manuel Fangio II	Eagle MkIII	1992 Checker Grand Prix
LMP900	0:54.795	James Weaver	Riley & Scott Mk III	2002 United Auto 200
IMSA GTP Lights	0:56.262	Dan Marvin	Spice SE91P	1992 Checker Grand Prix
WSC	0:56.675	Fermin Velez	Ferrari 333 SP	1995 Exxon World Sports Car Championships
Daytona Prototype	0:57.159	Max Angelelli	Riley MkXI	2004 Phoenix 250
LMP675	0:57.418	Marino Franchitti	Lola B2K/40	2002 United Auto 200
Barber Pro	0:58.201	Nicolas Rondet	Reynard 98E	2001 Phoenix Barber Pro round
Trans-Am	0:58.259	Tommy Kendall	Ford Mustang Trans-Am	1997 Phoenix Trans-Am round
IMSA GTS	0:58.473	Darin Brassfield	Oldsmobile Cutlass	1993 Checker Grand Prix
Grand-Am GTS	1:00.011	Tommy Riggins	Ford Mustang	2003 AJ's Fine Foods 250
IMSA GTS-1	1:00.376	Charles Morgan	Oldsmobile Cutlass Supreme	1995 Exxon World Sports Car Championships
GT1 (GTS)	1:00.434	Chris Bingham	Saleen S7-R	2002 United Auto 200
American GT (AGT)	1:00.435	Doug Goad	Chevrolet Corvette	2002 United Auto 200
Grand-Am GTO	1:01.122	Terry Borcheller	Saleen Mustang	2000 Phoenix Sun Automotive 200
GT	1:01.338	Bill Auberlen	BMW M3 (E46)	2004 Phoenix 250
IMSA GTO	1:01.818	Joe Pezza	Oldsmobile Cutlass	1993 Checker Grand Prix
Grand-Am GTU	1:01.900	Bill Auberlen	BMW M3 (E36)	2000 Phoenix Sun Automotive 200
Porsche Carrera Cup	1:03.904	David Murry	Porsche 911 (996) GT3 Cup	2004 Phoenix 250
IMSA Supercar	1:08.921	Shawn Hendricks	Nissan 300ZX Turbo Stillen	1993 Checker Grand Prix
Long Road Course (1964–1990): 2.700 mi (4.345 km)
Group 4	1:44.400	Dave MacDonald	Cooper Monaco King Cobra	1964 Phoenix National Open
Group 3	1:53.000	Ernie Kesling	Shelby Cobra	1965 Phoenix National Races
