= Taš =

Taš may refer to:

- Tašmajdan Park
- Tašmajdan Sports and Recreation Center

== See also ==
- Tash (disambiguation)
