= Robert L. Fletcher =

Arizona businessman and pioneer (1920–2020)

Robert Leslie Fletcher
- Born: March 28, 1920; Phoenix, Arizona
- Died: December 6, 2020 (aged 100); Peoria, Arizona
- Education: Phoenix Union High School; Phoenix College
- Occupations: Farmer; Businessman; Entrepreneur
- Spouse(s): Geraldine Wilson (m. 1942; died 1978) Karen McCormick (m. 1997)

Robert L. Fletcher was an American farmer who was a pioneer of the west valley of the Phoenix Metropolitan area. He worked closely with organizations across the state to ensure the conservation of the Arizona environment.

== Early life ==
Robert Leslie Fletcher was born in Phoenix, Arizona on March 28, 1920 to Emma and Herbert Fletcher. He had one sister, Helen. Fletcher attended Emerson Elementary School, and then Phoenix Union High School, graduating in 1938. He then attended Phoenix College, graduating in 1940.

Fletcher served in Africa and Italy during World War II in the Army Air Corps 41st Depot Repair Squadron. For his service, he earned the EAME medal and two bronze stars.

== Personal life ==
Robert Fletcher was very active in his community and church. He was president of the First Methodist Committee that worked to desegregate the local education system.

Fletcher married Geraldine Wilson on April 18, 1942 in a ceremony at Central Methodist Church. They had three children, all raised in North Central Phoenix. His wife died in 1978. In 1997, Fletcher married Karen McCormick.

== Farming ==
In 1939, Fletcher purchased 320 acres of virgin desert from a businessman working for Victory Equipment Co. This land was purchased near 83rd Ave. and Deer Valley Rd now a part of Peoria, Arizona. The holding eventually grew to 800 acres, where he first grew vegetables and cotton before converting to citrus.

In 1958, Fletcher served on the Arizona Cotton Growers Association’s committee to study an issue with pink bollworms in the area and try to eradicate them.

In the mid-1960s, Fletcher became one of the first commercial farmers in Arizona to use a no-tillage farming system. This allowed him to have a higher produce yield, specifically he was producing about double the amount of navel oranges than other local farmers. Around the same time, he was the first to dead level a field to conserve water, receiving the Soil Conservation Award in 1966 for his efforts.

Fletcher was instrumental in the founding of the C.A.P. to bring Colorado river water to Central Arizona. He was co-founder and board member of the McMicken Irrigation District #7 which brought cheaper water and electricity to Arizona farmers and continued providing water to the area for decades.

In 1982, Fletcher Farms was producing about half of the output for Arizona Citrus Growers. Fletcher Farms served as an agricultural study site for the University of Arizona. Fletcher farmed 10 acres for the university, testing pesticides, grafting techniques and growth stimulants, as well as planting varieties of citrus trees to see which was better suited to desert climates.

In 2013, Fletcher was inducted into the Arizona Farm and Ranch Hall of Fame.

=== Controversy ===
In 1972, a class action suit was filed against the Arizona Citrus Growers for failure to comply with requirements of Farm Labor Contractor Registration Act (FLCRA). The case specifically took aim at Fletcher Farms and the Bodine Produce Company. Numerous workers began striking along with filing the lawsuit stating that, “working and living conditions are ‘appalling.’” The case eventually went to the Ninth Circuit United States Court of Appeals in 1990 under the case name Six Mexican Workers. v. Arizona Citrus Growers. Fletcher Farms was found liable under the violations of engaging unregistered farm contractor and failure to obtain records. Fletcher Farms was ordered to pay roughly $225 per plaintiff as a result of the violations.

== Racing ==
Fletcher founded Fletcher Enterprises, which sold retail and wholesale auto parts, in 1970. The Cobre Tire Company started as an off-shoot of Fletcher Enterprises and eventually became one of the largest independent tire dealers in the country. Fletcher also promoted the Cobre Tire Company from 1973-1982 through his Fletcher Racing Team which competed in Indy car racing at venues including the California 500 and Indianapolis 500. The Fletcher Racing Team also participated in the Indycar World Series from 1980 through 1982. Art Pollard, Bobby Unser, Pancho Carter and Lee Kunzman raced for the team. The end of the Fletcher Racing team was often given to the fatal accident of Gordon Smiley in the practices of the Indy 500 of 1982.

In August 1976, Fletcher, along with other Phoenix businessmen, became a co-owner of Phoenix International Raceway helping foster many improvements to the facility. Fletcher was named president of the raceway in 1977, credited to his close association to the United States Auto Club and his racing background.

== Death and legacy ==
Fletcher died at age 100 on December 6, 2020.

The neighborhoods of Fletcher Heights and Fletcher Farms that were developed atop his former farm land in Peoria bear his name.

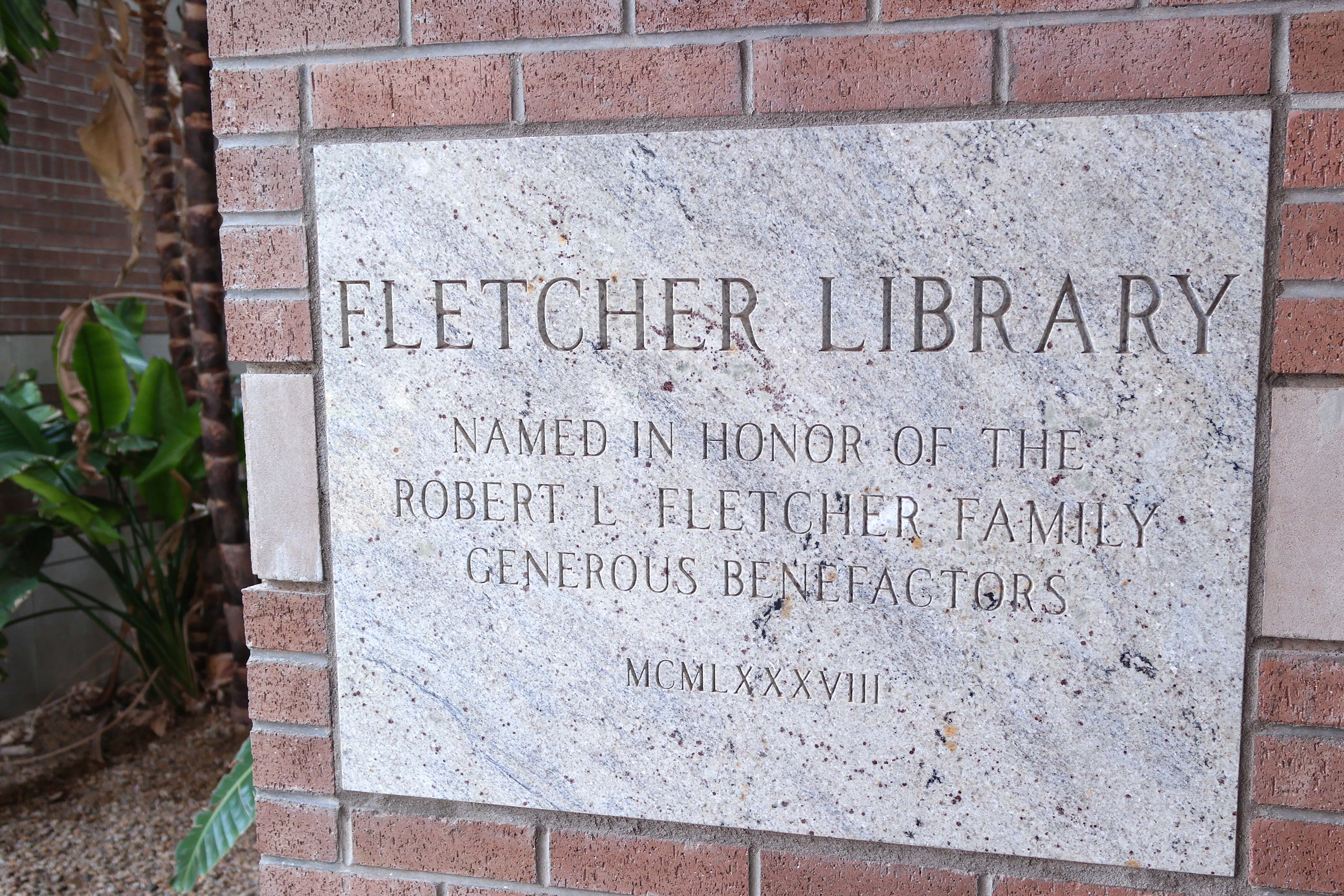
Plaque at Fletcher Library at ASU’s west campus.

The Fletcher Library at Arizona State University’s West Campus is named after him. He created an endowment that established the library at the campus and gives perpetual support for the library. Fletcher had been a member of the ASU Foundation and founded the university’s real estate committee.
