= William Shaffir =

Canadian sociologist

- Scientific career
- Fields: Sociology, sociology of religion, ethnography
- Institutions: McMaster University

William Shaffir is a Canadian sociologist. Shaffir has conducted studies on Canadian Jews, particularly on Hasidic Jews in Canada. He is the Associate Chair of the Sociology Department at McMaster University. He co-authored the book The Jews in Canada.

== Sociological research ==
William Shaffir has conducted a number of qualitative studies on Canadian Jewry.

=== Studies on Canadian Hasidim ===
Shaffir has conducted studies on several of the Hasidic groups in Montreal, including the Chabad-Lubavitch and Tosh Hasidic communities.
