= Tosh (surname) =

Tosh is a surname. Notable people with the surname include:

- Andrew Tosh (born 1967), reggae singer, son of Peter
- Daniel Tosh (born 1975), stand-up comedian and TV host
- Donald Tosh (1935–2019), BBC screenwriter
- Dwight Tosh (born 1948), American politician
- George Tosh (1813–1900), Scottish engineer and metallurgist
- J. R. Tosh (1872–1917), Scottish marine zoologist
- John Tosh, British historian
- Lawson C. Tosh (1879–?), American politician from Maryland
- Murray Tosh (born 1950), Scottish politician
- Paul Tosh (born 1973), Scottish football player
- Peter Tosh (1944–1987), Jamaican reggae musician, The Wailers
- Shoggy Tosh (born 1974), British–Nigerian author
- Steve Tosh (born 1973), football player
- Stuart Tosh (born 1951), drummer, songwriter and vocalist
