= J. R. Tosh =

Scottish canal engineer and marine biologist

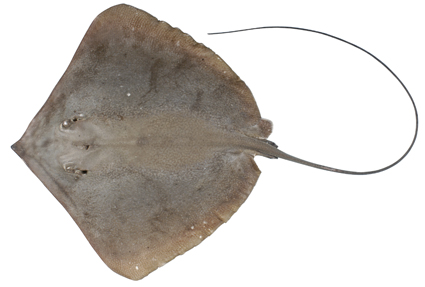
Himantura toshi

James Ramsay Tosh FRSE (1872–1917) was a 19th/20th century Scottish canal engineer and marine biologist. He gives his name to the Brown Whipray Himantura Toshi also known as Tosh's Whipray.

== Life ==
He was born in Dundee on 2 November 1872. He was educated at Donaldson Street School then Harris Academy in Dundee. He then studied at St Andrews University graduating BSc MA in 1894.

In 1900 he was employed by the government of Queensland in Australia as a fisheries expert for 3 years. From 1905 to 1915 he was Assistant Professor of Zoology at St Andrews University.

In 1911 he was elected a Fellow of the Royal Society of Edinburgh. His proposers were William Carmichael McIntosh, Sir Peter Redford Scott Lang, James Musgrove, and Robert Alexander Robertson.

He returned to Queensland in 1915 having been offered a post in the Queensland Pearling Syndicate.

In the First World War he joined the British Red Cross in 1916 and served in the Ambulance Corps in the Middle East. He died of heatstroke while serving in Mesopotamia in May 1917.
