= HD Tach =

Type of software benchmarking program

- Developer(s): Simpli Software Inc.
- Stable release: 3.0.4.0 / April 24, 2007
- Operating system: Windows 2000 or XP
- Type: Benchmark Program
- License: Trialware/Shareware $50

HD Tach is a software program for Microsoft Windows (2000 or XP) that tests and graphs the sequential read, random access and interface burst speeds of attached storage devices (hard drive, flash drive, removable drive etc.). Drive technologies such as SCSI, IDE/ATA, IEEE 1394, USB, SATA and RAID are supported.

A prominent feature of the software was an included library of drive benchmarks, as well as the option to save your own drive's benchmarks locally or submit them to an online database. The company's website also had a forum with over 2000 user posts.

On December 5, 2011, citing the lack of time to devote to the project, Simpli Software formally announced on its website that HD Tach had reached end-of-life and was no longer being supported. The domain has since expired.

The latest version of this application (3.0.4.0) is not fully compatible with Windows Vista, Windows 7, or Windows 8. However, HD Tach works in these operating systems by running it in Windows XP SP2 or SP3 compatibility mode. HD Tach 2.70 is the last version to work on Windows NT 4.0.

== History ==
HD Tach was originally developed by TCD Labs, Inc. In 2000 the company was acquired by Oak Technology, Inc. Simpli Software, Inc. was formed by the original group of TCD Labs employees and acquired all rights to the benchmarks and source code from Oak Technology in 2003. The domain name displayed in the software, simplisoftware.com, began resolving to a domain reseller landing page in November 2012.

== Bibliography ==
- Nistor, Codrut (2007-08-17), HD Tach 3 Review, archived from the original on 2013-02-03
- Brozio, Kristofer (2006-08-07), HD Tach RW V 3.0.1.0 from Simpli Software
