= Tosh (nickname) =

Tosh is a nickname of:

- Tosh Askew, English rugby coach
- Tosh Barrell (1888–1960), English footballer
- Tosh Chamberlain (1934–2021), English former footballer
- Tosh Farrell, former coach at Premier League club, Everton FC
- Tosh Masson (born 1985), rugby union player, former Harlequins player in the Guinness Premiership
- Tosh McKinlay (born 1964), Scottish footballer
- Tosh Powell (c. 1900–1928), Welsh boxer
- John Toshack (born 1949), former footballer and manager
