= Arizona State University West Valley campus =

Public university campus in Phoenix, Arizona, U.S.

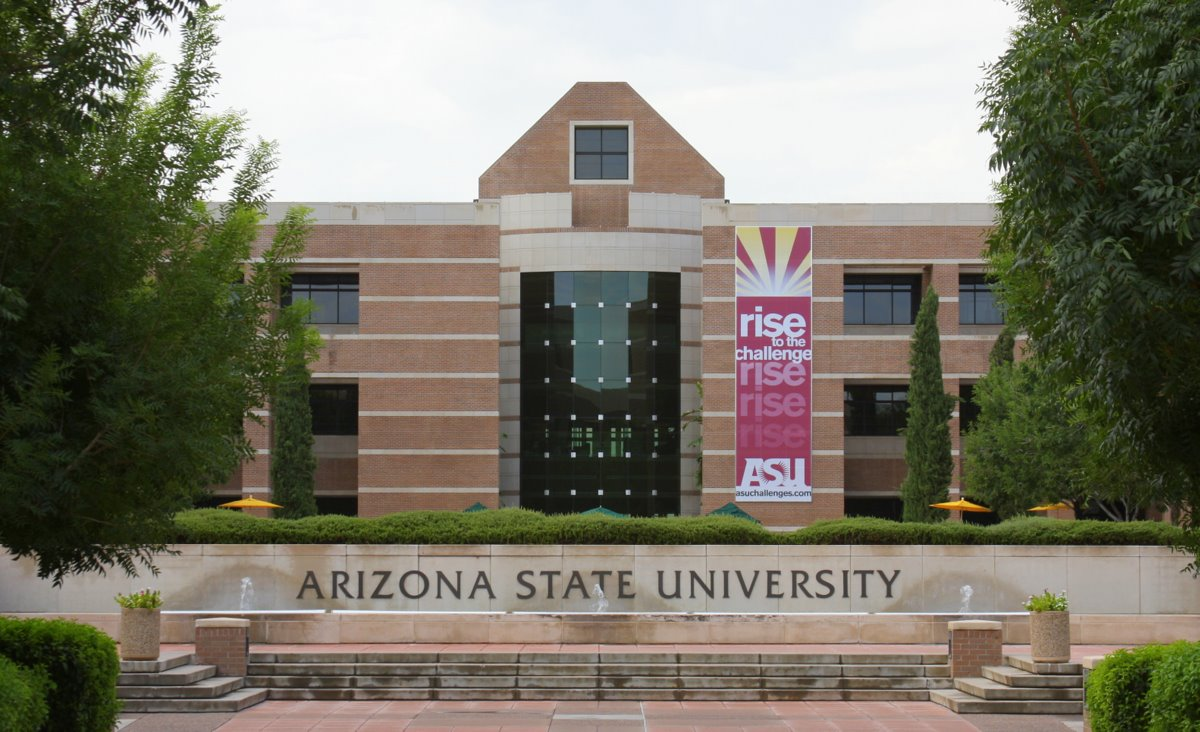
- Fletcher Library at ASU West Valley campus
- Type: Campus of Arizona State University
- Established: 1984
- President: Michael M. Crow
- Students: 4,968
- Location: Phoenix, Arizona, United States; 33°36′28″N 112°9′36″W
- Campus: Suburban, 277.92 acres (1.1247 km^{2})
- Website: West Valley campus website
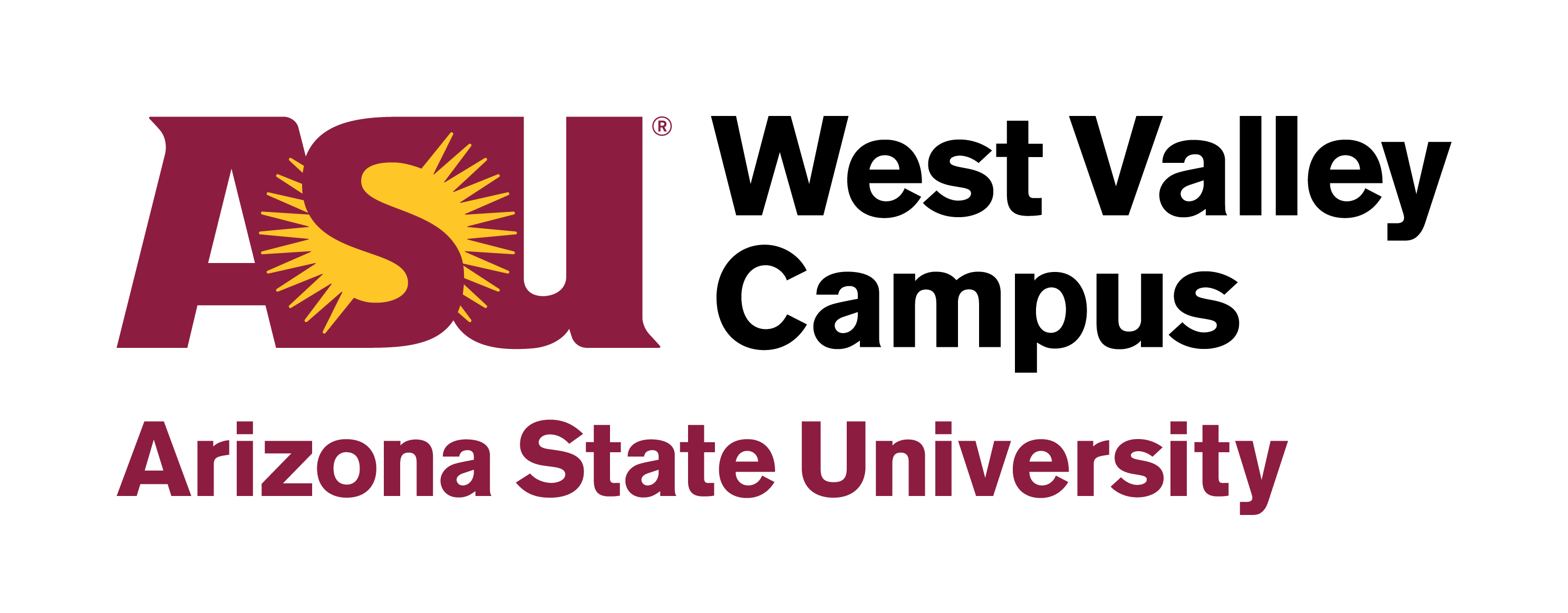

Arizona State University West Valley campus is one of five university campuses that compose Arizona State University (ASU), located in Phoenix, Arizona. The West Valley campus was established by the Arizona Legislature in 1984, and is located in northwest Phoenix, bordering the city of Glendale.

For many purposes, ASU's campuses are unified as a single institution so the West Valley campus shares students, faculty, administration, and accreditation with the other campuses. As of Fall 2009, 10,380 students were enrolled in at least one course on the West Valley campus, while the FTE enrollment for the campus is 6,173. Since Fall 2018, on campus enrollment has been about 5,000 on ground students every year.

In 2008, the West Valley campus was designated as a Phoenix Point of Pride, and in 2011, construction concluded on a large solar array that powers nearly the entire campus with solar power.

== History ==
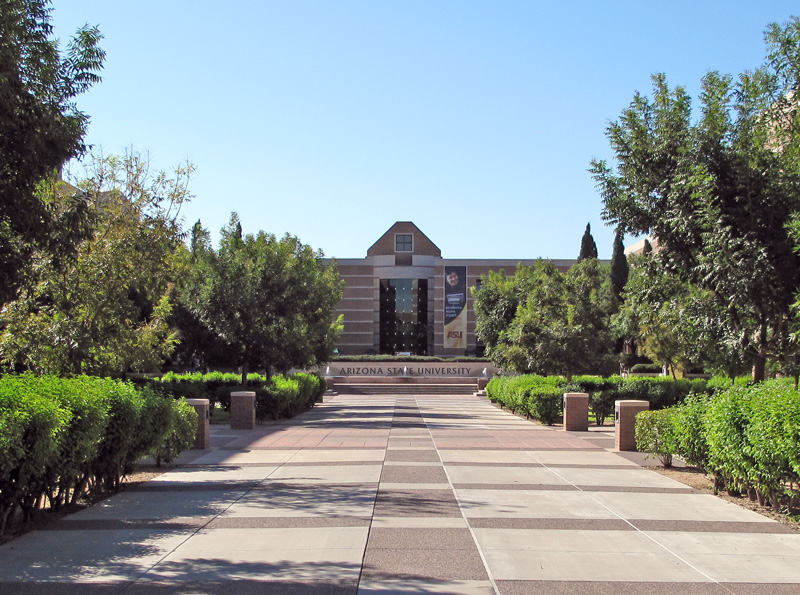
Main pedestrian mall; Fletcher Library in background

Arizona state legislator, Anne Lindeman, located three hundred acres of state land that the West Valley campus currently occupies in 1982. She also drafted the 1984 legislation that created the ASU West Valley campus. Lindeman also created the legislation for the lease-purchase agreement that allowed for $48 million for additional campus construction in 1988.

Established as the second ASU campus in 1984, construction of the West Valley Campus began in February 1986. Prior to the opening of the campus, some classes were held at five other locations in the area including Metrocenter Mall. The Fletcher Library was the first building completed, dedicated in 1988 to honor Robert L. Fletcher and his family, whose gift of property resulted in an endowment for the perpetual support of the library. More buildings were completed like the Sands Classroom Building and the Administration Offices Building, the following year, in 1989. The second main classroom building, Classroom/Lab/Computer Classroom Building, was constructed in 2 phases, with Phase 1 opening in Spring 1991 and Phase 2 opening Spring 2002.

Originally known as "ASU West," this campus operated quasi-independently of the Tempe campus and had its own administration, faculty, and student admissions process. At the time, the West Valley campus was designed to offer only upper-level undergraduate courses (with lower-level courses to be taken at nearby Glendale Community College). In 2001, freshmen students were admitted, allowing them to complete their entire undergraduate education on the West Valley campus. The academic offerings on the West Valley campus were designed to highlight an interdisciplinary focus in the liberal arts and sciences, education, and business. With the arrival of current ASU president Michael Crow in 2002, the academic structure of ASU was reorganized to integrate the West Valley campus into the university as a whole. Today, the West Valley campus shares faculty, students, accreditation, and administration with the other ASU campuses.

In March 2023, the university announced it would be expanding its West Valley campus adding two new buildings in order to add more programs to the campus, among these was a second residence hall. It also announced that it would begin more classes in business, forensics, and engineering starting that fall semester. The University hopes that with this new expansion is can add roughly ten thousand new students to its West Valley campus, helping those in the West Valley, more easily access ASU programs.

== Academics and Programs ==
The programs offered on the West Valley campus focus on interdisciplinary and collaborative programs in the liberal arts and sciences, education, and business, leading to bachelor's, master's and doctoral degrees. The West Valley campus is the headquarters of ASU's New College of Interdisciplinary Arts and Sciences and Mary Lou Fulton Teachers College, and offers additional programs from the W. P. Carey School of Business. ASU's Graduate College, Honors College and University College also have an administrative presence on the campus.

In 2015, the Thunderbird School of Global Management, which had recently become part of ASU, began offering an undergraduate program at ASU's West Valley campus.^{; (See also}^{and}^{.)} Thunderbird's headquarters and its graduate programs, previously based in Glendale, Arizona, are now located at and integrated into ASU’s downtown Phoenix campus, while the undergraduate programs remain in the West Valley.

In 2023, the West Valley Forward campaign announced the development of three new schools that will be housed in the new academic building being built. This is bringing Ira A. Fulton Schools of Engineering to the West Valley campus.

== Facilities ==
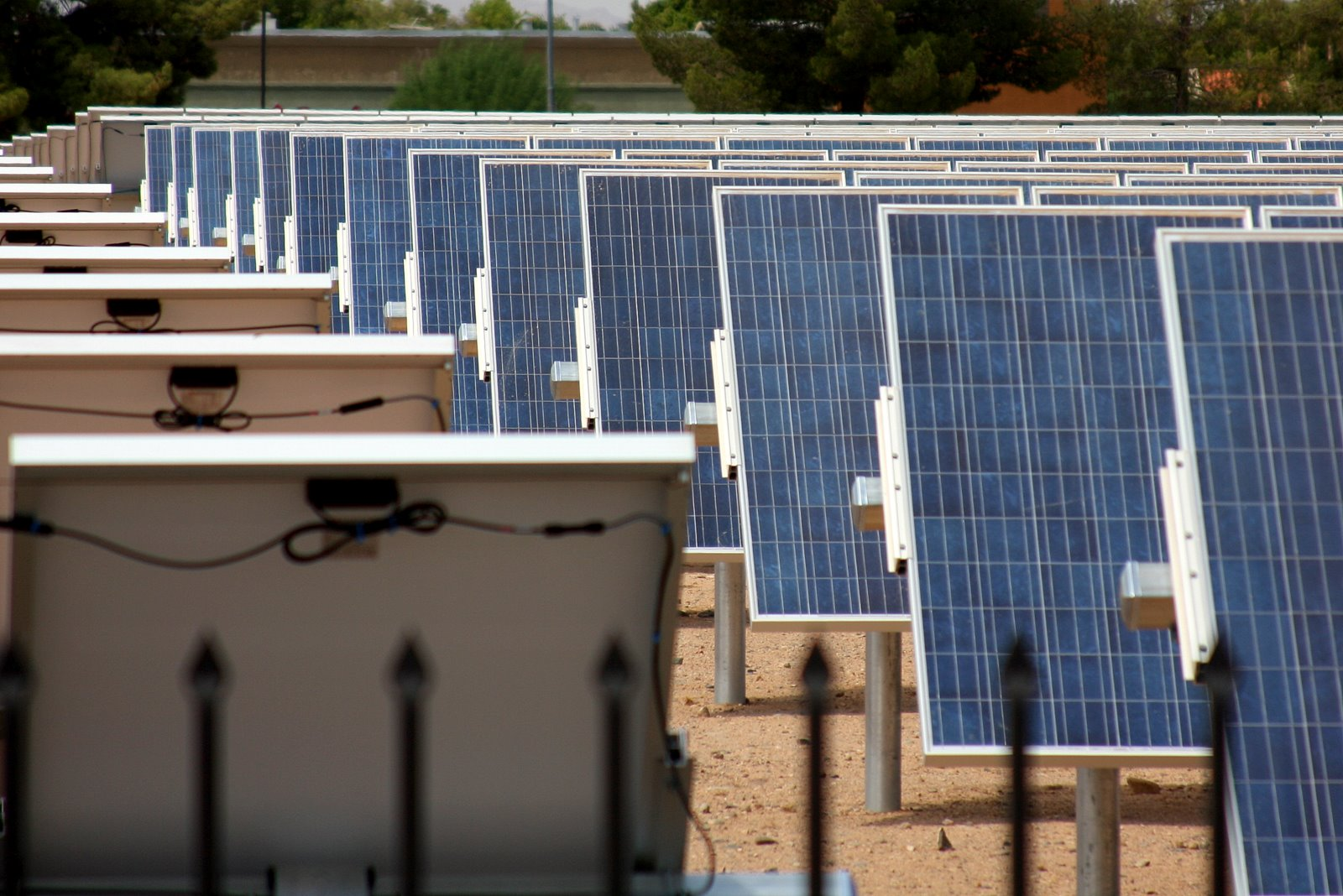
The West Valley campus receives nearly all of its electricity from a 4.6MW on-site solar array.

The West Valley campus is the smallest of ASU's campuses in terms of facility space (square footage of buildings). The campus primarily consists of five academic buildings arranged around a quad, with a secondary quad surrounded by the campus's dormitories, dining hall, and recreation center.

In 2011, the Gary K. Herberger Young Scholars Academy, a private school for gifted children, opened on the east side of the campus. In August 2017 the school moved into a new 19,500 sq foot building near the secondary quad. The school currently uses the Cambridge Learning Curriculum and a move on when ready program. The six levels range from Middle Years 1 to A-Level years. The two levels of Middle Years houses students from 10 to 14 years old. The IGSCE year houses students from 12 to 15 years old. A-Level years usually host students 15–18 years old. The Herberger Young Scholars Academy shares facilities with the rest of the ASU West Valley campus.

=== Academic Buildings ===
There are two main classroom buildings on the West Valley Campus: Sands and Classroom/Lab/Computer Classroom (CLCC). These buildings house a majority of the classrooms on campus. Sands is mainly standard lecture rooms with the average capacity of about 36 students. CLCC has standard classrooms with a wide range of capacities, but is mostly home to the laboratories of the West Valley campus. CLCC houses all of the teaching laboratory classrooms as well as the research laboratories of New College faculty, namely the wet lab laboratories of the School of Mathematical and Natural Science faculty and the School of Interdisciplinary Forensics faculty.

ASU West Valley has a single standard lecture hall, Lecture Hall 110, with a capacity for 150 students. It is the largest classroom on campus.

A new academic building is being constructed as part of the West Valley Forward Campaign launched in March 2023. Construction started in Fall of 2023, and the building is expected to be finished Spring 2025. The new building will house additional classrooms, computer classrooms, faculty offices, research labs, and additional growth space as more programs move to West Valley campus.

=== Residence Halls ===
Two residential complexes are located on the West Valley campus: Casa De Oro, a LEED Silver complex built in 2012, offers traditional dormitory-style accommodations in which students are arranged based on their academic area of study. Las Casas, built in 2002, offers apartment-style units for upper-division and graduate students.

A new residential building named Casa Del Valle is also being constructed as part of the West Valley Forward Campaign. Construction started in Fall of 2023, and the building is expected to be open Fall 2024. The new residential hall will bring an additional 500 beds to West to house on campus students.

== See also ==
- List of historic properties in Phoenix, Arizona
