= Tash (surname) =

Tash is the surname of the following people:

- Altun Tash (died 1032), Central Asian Shah
- Lola Tash (born 1993), Canadian actress
- Maria Tash, American jeweler
- Nolan Tash (born 1977), volleyball player from Trinidad and Tobago
- Paul Tash (born 1954), American journalist

== See also ==
- Teymourtash (surname)
