= Kiryas Tosh =

Hasidic Jewish community in Boisbriand, Quebec

Kiryas Tosh Hebrew: קִרְיַת טאהש Tash (Hebrew: טאהש)
- Hasidic Jewish community
- Etymology: Nyírtass, Hungary
- Location in Quebec Kiryas Tosh (Central Quebec) Kiryas Tosh (Quebec)
- Coordinates: 45.6129327°N 73.8704287°W
- Country: Canada
- Province: Quebec
- Region: Laurentides
- RCM: Thérèse-De Blainville
- Founded: 1964
- Founder: Rabbi Meshulim Feish Lowy
- Named for: Tosh (present-day Nyírtass), Hungary

Government
  - Federal riding: Rivière-des-Mille-Îles
  - Prov. riding: Groulx

Area
  - Total: 0.46 km^{2} (0.18 sq mi)
  - Land: 0.46 km^{2} (0.18 sq mi)

Population (2021)
  - Total: 2,280
  - Density: 4,914/km^{2} (12,730/sq mi)
  - Pop 2016–2021: ▲8.8%
- Time zone: UTC– 05:00 (EST)
  - Summer (DST): UTC– 04:00 (EDT)
- Postal code(s): J7E 4H4, J7E 0A6, J7E 0B7, J7E 0B2, J7E 0C3
- Area codes: 450 and 579 and 438

Kiryas Tosh (Hebrew: קִרְיַת טאהש), also called Tash (Hebrew: טאהש), is a Hasidic Jewish community in the town of Boisbriand, Quebec. It is affiliated with the Tosh Hasidic dynasty. According to the 2021 Canadian census, the community is home to about 2,055 people.

== Naming ==
Kiryas Tosh, or Kiryas Tash (English: Town of Tash), is named after the town of Tash, Hungary (now Nyírtass, Hungary), near Slovak and Ukrainian borders, where Tasher (Tosher) rebbes once gathered.

== History ==
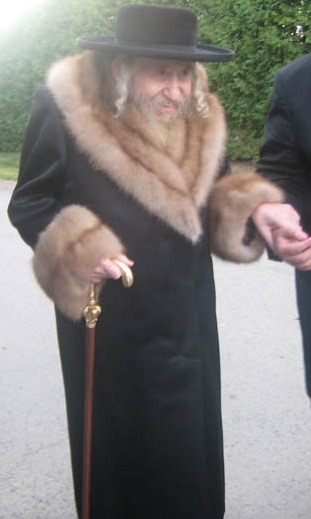
The Tosher Rebbe

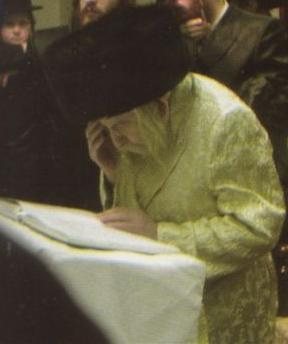
The Tosher Rebbe in prayer

The community was formed in 1963 by Rebbe Meshulim Feish (Ferencz) Lowy. Lowy moved to Montreal in 1951, but viewed the moral climate in the community as deteriorating, and not conducive to the study of Torah. The Rabbi and 18 families moved to the Boisbriand area in 1963, in an attempt to better insulate and isolate the community from outside influences. Since then, the population of the community has greatly increased, mostly due to the high fertility rates of Hasidic communities.

In 2019, a mass vaccination campaign against measles was carried out, after a measles outbreak occurred, suspected to have been carried from the endemic measles persistent hotspot in New York City. Most members of the community had already had vaccinations, but not all, and not all up to date in booster shots. Vaccination levels show that anti-vaccination sentiment did not afflict the community.

At the end of March 2020, the community was placed under quarantine, after an outbreak of Coronavirus disease 2019, making it a hotspot in the COVID-19 pandemic. It is thought that members of the community who travelled to New York City for a Purim religious celebration in early March became infected with COVID-19.

== Economics ==
According to research by McMaster University, about 20% of men living in Kiryas Tosh work outside of the community. Those who work outside of the community usually work in either specialized Jewish businesses, as Shochetim, (ritual slaughterers), and teachers in religious schools, or in Jewish-owned businesses in the greater Montreal area. The rest of the community work in either religious jobs (at the community synagogue, mikvah, or yeshiva), or own their own small-scale retail businesses out of their homes (from jewellery making and shatnez laboratories to accounting and insurance agencies). The community has a small shopping centre, housing a kosher supermarket, a kosher butcher, a toy store, and a clothing store, as well as shops to buy Judaica items.

Kiryas Tosh is served by its own Hatzolah unit for medical services, making it one of only three chapters in all of Canada. The village is also patrolled by a volunteer neighbourhood watch group known as Chevrah Shomrim, which consists of over 60 young people that patrol the streets and respond when one calls for help, working in conjunction with the local police forces.

To help ensure the survival of the community's stringent religious traditions, relative isolation from the outside world is considered desirable by the village's leaders. This isolation has led to distrust between many members of the community and the outside world, and vice versa. Inter-community suspicion has led to incidents of hateful vandalism against residents' property in Kiryas Tosh. Institutions in Kiryas Tosh have also expressed their distrust of the outside community.

== Bylaws ==
In order to protect the community from what he perceived as the moral decay of the outside community, Rebbe Lowy put together a set of by-laws "to govern the behaviour of all the residents" of Kiryas Tosh. To live in this community, residents need to abide by these by-laws.

1. No book, newspaper, or magazine is permitted in the buildings of the community, unless their content is in conformity to strictly Orthodox Judaism.
2. All male members of the community must attend religious services, three times per day, at the synagogue.
3. No radio, television, record, or cassette is allowed in the buildings of the community.
4. No members of the community may attend the cinema or be present at any theatrical performance, under the penalty of immediate expulsion.
5. All women residing in the community must dress in accordance with the religious laws of modesty, as follows:
  1. All dresses must be at least four inches below the knees; no trousers or panty-hose may be worn by women and girls 3 years of age or older.
  2. Married women's hair must be completely covered in public, by a scarf, a snood, or a wig.
6. It is forbidden for unrelated men and women to walk together in the street.
7. Men and women must be separated by a wall (at least 7 feet high), when attending any gathering of a religious or social nature.
8. All food consumed in the buildings of the community must conform to the dietary laws of the Code of Laws, and be approved by the chief rabbi or his second in command.
9. No car may be driven by an unmarried man.
10. The members must submit any inter-personal conflict to the arbitration of a rabbinical court.
11. The Sabbath must be observed in strict conformity to Jewish law.
12. Male members of the community must study the Torah and other religious texts for at least two hours a day.

Teachers of secular subjects who come into the community must follow guidelines of their own:

1. All textbooks and literature to be used by the students in class or at home must first be approved by the principal.
2. No stencil or photo-copy of any other book may be used without approval.
3. Students are not permitted to go to the public library, nor is the teacher permitted to bring into the school, for the students, any such books.
4. No newspaper or magazine may be read in school or hung up. Students are not permitted to read the above at home either.
5. No records or tape may be used in the classroom without approval.
6. No extra subjects, books, magazine supplement, or other information which is not on the required curriculum of the school may be taught.
7. For extra credit work or for class projects, students should not be told to write away for such material. The teacher should supply them with the material with approval.
8. No discussion on sexuality.
9. No discussions of reproduction.
10. No discussion about radio, television, or movies.
11. No discussion about Women's Liberation.
12. No homework on Thursdays.

== Politics ==
The community seems to avoid voting in federal elections. In a poll-by-poll map of Rivière-des-Mille-Îles, the riding that covers Kiryas Tosh, voter turnout was as low as 10% in 2008. In the 2011 election, the community was evenly split between the Liberal and the Conservative candidates in their riding, while the riding itself was won by Laurin Liu of the NDP. In the 2015 election, the area went heavily for the Liberals, and the riding itself was won by Linda Lapointe of the Liberal Party.

The community caused a controversy among Quebec Jews when it seemed as if the community would support a "Yes" vote in the 1995 Quebec referendum, running contrary to the opinion of the other Jews in the province, who largely supported the federalist "No" side.

== See also ==
- Tosh Hasidic dynasty
- Outremont neighbourhood with a Hasidic community in Montreal
