= Nyírtass =

Village in Szabolcs-Szatmár-Bereg County, Hungary

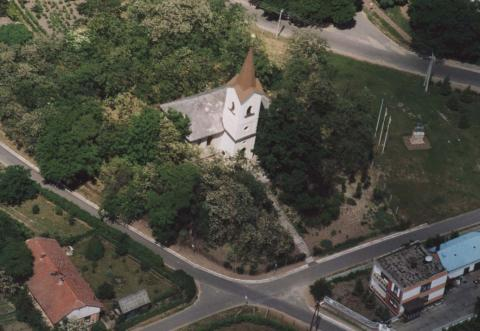
- Aerial photography of Nyírtass

- Flag Coat of arms

- Location within Hungary
- Coordinates: 48°07′N 22°02′E
- Country: Hungary
- County: Szabolcs-Szatmár-Bereg

Area
  - Total: 37.95 km^{2} (14.65 sq mi)

Population (2001)
  - Total: 2,183
  - Density: 57.52/km^{2} (149.0/sq mi)
- Time zone: UTC+1 (CET)
  - Summer (DST): UTC+2 (CEST)
- Postal code: 4522
- Area code: 45

Nyírtass, formerly Tass (German: Tausch, Yiddish: טאָהש Tosh), is a Hungarian village in Szabolcs-Szatmár-Bereg county. The village dates back to the 13th century; the name of the river Nyír was added as a prefix in 1908.

The town has a rich Jewish history, as it had two famous rabbis living there. The Tosh Hasidic Dynasty, originating from Nyírtass, has a Jewish community in Boisbriand, Quebec, Canada named Kiryas Tosh. Named after the former name of the town, Kiryas Tosh was built by its grand rabbi Meshulim Feish Lowy, whose grandfathers were the rabbis in Nyírtass.

There is a Jewish cemetery in Nyírtass where the aforementioned rabbis are buried. There is a big presence of orthodox Jews present every year on the day they died.

In 2001, 99% of the population of the settlement declared themselves Hungarian, 1% of them declared to be of Roma nationality.

== Sights ==
The sights of Nyírtass include the Roman Catholic, the Greek Catholic and the Reformed Church; the mansion, the mayor's office, and the park that was handed over at the turn of the millennium.

== See also ==
- Tosh (Hasidic dynasty)
