= Toch =

Toch may refer to:

- Toc H, a charitable Christian service club

People

- Ernst Toch (1887–1964), a Jewish Austrian composer of Czech descent
- Hans Toch (1930–2021), Austrian-US social psychologist and criminologist
- Joanna Toch (born 1961), British rower and barrister
- Maximilian Toch (1864–1946), American chemist

== See also ==
- Totj, an Australian ethnic group
