= Hans Toch =

American social psychologist (1930–2021)

- Born: April 17, 1930; Vienna, Austria
- Died: June 18, 2021 (aged 91)
- Education: Brooklyn College; Princeton University
- Awards: (with Jeremy Travis) 2001 August Vollmer Award from the American Society of Criminology; 2005 Prix DeGreff from the International Society of Criminology
- Scientific career
- Fields: Criminology
- Workplaces: University at Albany, SUNY
- Thesis: The perceptual elaboration of a stroboscopic presentation of three contiguous squares (1955)

Hans Herbert Toch (April 17, 1930 – June 18, 2021) was a social psychologist and criminologist. He was Distinguished Professor Emeritus in the School of Criminal Justice at the University at Albany, SUNY. He was a fellow of the American Psychological Association and the American Society of Criminology, and served as president of the American Association for Forensic Psychology in 1996. He was the co-recipient of the 2001 August Vollmer Award from the American Society of Criminology, and received the 2005 "Prix DeGreff" Award from the International Society of Criminology.

Toch was born in Vienna, Austria.
