= Tosh (Hasidic dynasty) =

Hungarian Hasidic dynasty

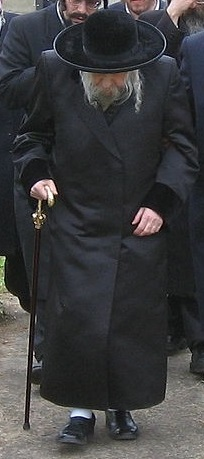
Leader Meshulim Feish Lowy in Hungary, 2005

Tosh (also "Tash"; Hebrew/Yiddish: טאהש) is a Hasidic dynasty originating in Nyirtass, Hungary. It is based in Kiryas Tosh, Quebec, Canada, outside Boisbriand, Quebec, a suburb of Montreal. The hereditary leader is Rabbi Elimelch Halevi Segal-Loewy, who succeeded his father, Meshulim Feish Lowy, upon the latter's death on 12 August 2015. Tosher Hasidim have synagogues in New York State, United States, in Borough Park, Brooklyn, Williamsburg, Brooklyn, Kiryas Joel, and Monsey, as well as in Montreal and in London, England.

== The Tosh dynasty ==
The first Tosher rebbe was Meshulam Feish Segal-Loewy I, a disciple of Rabbi David Spira of Dinov son of Tzvi Elimelech Spira of Dinov.

- Meshulam Feish Segal-Lowy I of Tosh - disciple of Rabbi David Spira of Dinov
  - Elimelech Segal-Lowy of Tosh (1865–1942), son of Meshulam Feish and disciple of Rabbi Eliezer Tzvi Safrin
    - Mordechai Segal-Lowy of Demecser - son of Elimelech of Tosh
      - Meshulam Feish Segal-Lowy II of Tosh (1921–2015), reviver of the Tosh dynasty after the Holocaust - son of Mordechai of Demetsche and his wife Tzirl
        - Elimelech Segal-Lowy of Tosh - son of Meshulam Feish Segal-Lowy of Tosh

The Tosh community was revived after the Holocaust by rebbe Meshulim Feish Lowy (Hungarian form: Lőwy Ferencz), who was born in Nyirtass, Hungary, in the Jewish year 5682 (1921 or 1922 CE). He survived the Holocaust in the Hungarian Labour Service, and was liberated by the Red Army from a camp outside Marghita in October 1944. He became the rebbe of the surviving Hasidim of his father, Mordechai Márton Lőwy, who was murdered in Auschwitz with most of his extended family, and he established his court in Nyíregyháza. In 1951, fearing the Hungarian People's Republic's communist government, he told his followers to leave Hungary, and emigrated to Canada, settling in Montreal. In 1963, he and his Hasidim purchased an area in Boisbriand, Quebec, forming the enclave of Kiryas Tosh. Lőwy was married to Chava (née Weingarten), a direct descendant of Elimelech of Lizhensk, from 1946 until her death in 1996. He married Malka Hass in 2007.

He was succeeded by Elimelech Segal-Lowy.
